= Robert Ford (One Life to Live) =

- One Life to Live character
- Portrayed by: David A. Gregory
- Duration: 2009–2012
- First appearance: August 10, 2009
- Last appearance: January 10, 2012
- Created by: Ron Carlivati
- Introduced by: Frank Valentini
In-universe information
- Other names: Ford
- Occupation: Film producer; Film professor at Llanview University; Hot dog vendor
- Parents: Eddie Ford; Inez Salinger
- Brothers: James Ford; Nate Salinger
- Spouse: Jessica Buchanan (2011)
- Sons: Ryder Ford

Robert Ford is a fictional character from the ABC original soap opera One Life to Live. The role was originated by David A. Gregory on August 10, 2009 on a recurring basis. Gregory was upgraded to contract status in December 2009, and he remained on the show through the end of its run, last airing January 10, 2012.

== Character creation and casting ==
David A. Gregory debuted in the recurring role of Ford in August 2009. Originally, his role was meant to be short term, but Gregory is later placed on contract and returns in December 2009. In an interview with Michael Fairman, Gregory reveals the producers original plan for Ford: "Initially they were going to have him, you know a well suited up producer, kind of slick and then when they wrote that scene [the barn scene], I remember thinking, 'This is kind of unlike anything we've done before." Though the writers make him out to be the bad guy originally, steps are taken to redeem the character.

Not that I wanted to be a squeaky clean guy, but they are adding elements that make him why the way he is. A lot of directors I have worked with since have told me, “We don’t want him to lose his fire, because that is what kind of makes him interesting.” So that is not going away, but once he brought in family members, it allowed us to see, not that he is justified in the way he is, but that it makes more sense. So I don’t know if it’s as much that Ford is being redeemed, as much as it is explaining to people why he is the way he is.

-MichaelFairmanSoaps.com

When Gregory returned, he found out from executive producer, Frank Valentini that his character was getting a brother, James Ford (played by Nic Robuck). Later, Nate Salinger (played by Lenny Platt) was revealed to be their younger brother as well. Gregory was surprised that Platt's character would be tied into his storyline, because Platt was already on the show and his character was already involved in another storyline. Gregory's co-star Brittany Underwood (Langston Wilde) occasionally mistook Platt for Gregory while onset.

== Storylines ==
Robert Ford, going by his last name Ford, shows up in Llanview in August 2009 as the young producer of a reality television show David Vickers is trying to film. After being rejected by his ex-wife, Dorian Lord at La Boulaie, the film crew goes to Llanfair and tries to secretly tape David's interactions with his friend, Victoria Lord. But when Jessica Brennan sees someone hiding in the bushes, she assumes it is the stalker who had been following her. She bashes the person over the head, only to find out that the person is Ford. After Viki kicks David out, the film crew moves on to the Buchanan mansion and takes up temporary residence in the horse stables. Langston Wilde goes looking for her boyfriend Markko Rivera, who is working as the cameraman, when she spies Ford trying to beat the heat by pouring a bucket of water over his head and bare chest. Langston likes what she sees but is embarrassed when Ford sees her watching him. They chat about the reality show and seem to hit it off. When Markko interrupts, Ford takes off. Later, Ford quits and leaves town after realizing the reality show idea was a flop.

On New Year's Eve, Ford surprises Langston by showing up at Ultraviolet. Langston has thought about Ford often since their encounter in the stables, and Ford says he has been thinking about her, too. When Markko interrupts them, he is dismayed to learn that Ford has taken a job at Llanview University as a teaching assistant in the very class that Markko will be taking. Ford hits on Layla Williamson while working out at the gym but backs off after learning she is dating Cristian Vega. When Ford needs a place to stay, Layla, Cris, and then-roommate Fish invite him to stay with them.

Ford tells Cris that he is smitten with a younger woman, and Cris assumes she is a college student, not the high school senior Langston. Langston confides in her cousin Blair that she has fantasized about Ford while having sex with Markko, and Blair warns Langston to stay away from Ford. When Ford shows up at Langston's 18th Birthday party, she secretly makes out with Ford. After interrupting them, Blair tells Ford to go after someone his own age and plants a wet kiss on Ford. Later, Blair invites Ford to La Boulaie to prove to Langston that Ford is only interested in sex; when Ford arrives, he pretends that he only came there to tell Blair to back off, and Langston falls for his lies. Ford accuses Langston of playing it safe with Markko and eventually gets Langston into bed. Langston and Ford continue their affair, although Langston is unaware of Ford's other pursuits. Llanview University student Hannah O'Connor, who had been paired up with Cole Thornhart on a class project, confides in Cole that she has recently broken up with her boyfriend and then gotten involved with an older man, a teaching assistant at Llanview University who dumped her after they had sex. After Hannah nearly overdoses on pills, Cole learns that the man was Ford. Ford also is having casual sex with Karen, the pizza delivery girl. Hannah confronts Ford at the diner, in front of Cole and Markko, about dumping her after they had sex. Ford convinces everyone that Hannah is stalking him and they never had sex.

When Langston's best friend and roommate Starr Manning comes home to find Langston and Ford together, with an open condom wrapper on the floor, Langston admits she is having sex with Ford. But Langston refuses to break it off with Ford, going so far as to lie to Starr and Cole that she had broken up with him. Langston briefly considers actually breaking up with Ford when Markko nearly catches them together at the Palace Hotel and Ford embarrasses Markko. But Ford tells Langston that she is the one making Markko look like a fool, and Ford tells Langston that he is falling in love with her. The two are later caught kissing by Destiny Evans who tells her friend, Matthew Buchanan. When Destiny and Matthew are deciding whether to tell Markko, their conversation is accidentally recorded on Markko's video camera.

On prom night, Ford asks Langston to come over and she says that she cannot but later changes her mind. Meanwhile, Ford invites Karen over and Langston finds them having sex. Ford manages to convince Langston that his thing with Karen was just a one-time thing, and they start kissing as Markko walks in. He is furious and after a few heated words, punches Ford out. Ford then tells Langston that they never had anything real – it was just sex. Ford later finds Jessica Buchanan (who thinks she is a seventeen-year-old in high school) crying on his doorstep after Cristian rejects her and proposes to Layla. Ford convinces her that sex will help her forget about how Cristian hurt her and the two go to bed together. But before anything happens, Jessica remembers when her father Mitch Laurence tried to rape her. Ford attempts to calm her down, which is how he is last seen until Cristian and Layla find him brutally beaten.

On June 9, 2010, Ford's younger brother James comes to Llanview to visit him in the hospital. On July 2, it is revealed that Ford was attacked by Elijah Clarke, who is really Bennett Thompson. On July 22, Ford learns from James (who is still unaware that Inez is his mother) that Inez has another son with Ford's father, Nate. On August 8, 2010 all three brothers reunite with Inez. It is also revealed to Clint that Ford is the father of Jessica's new unborn baby, so he has Vimal Patel change her paternity test to say that the baby's father is Jessica's fiancée, Brody Lovett. John McBain takes Ford in for questioning. When he arrives at the police station, John gets him to admit that Eli attacked him. Ford doesn't budge at first and then Kelly convinces him to admit it and write it on his statement. After the whole Eli mess blows over, he tries to get Langston to take him back, but she does not fall for it and makes sure he doesn't come near her again. Langston records her and Ford's love scene and turns it in to the dean's office immediately. The next day the dean fires him on the spot and puts it on his permanent record, making it so that he can never teach again. Ford was devastated when he found out it was Langston that set him up. He vowed never to see her again. He is currently working at the country club as a bus boy. Clint is contemplating on getting the dean to reinstate him.

On January 11, 2011, Jessica gave birth to Ford's son, who she and Brody named Ryder Asa Lovett, thinking that Brody is the biological father. On February 14, 2011, Ford learns he is Ryder's biological father from Access Llanview and that Clint had Jessica's DNA test changed, although everybody believed that it was only Vimal's doing. A shocked Ford seeks out Jessica and Ryder, but instead finds Brody, who refuses to let Ford anywhere near Jessica or the child. As Ford is about to see Langston for their Valentine's Day date, he bumps into Jessica who reveals that she is really her alter, Tess. Ford is upset that he may never get to know his son, so Tess comes up with a plan to fix that, and the two leave town for Las Vegas. Langston and Brody track them down but find they are too late. Ford and Tess get married and return to Llanview, living in Ford's crowded apartment with James, Ryder and eventually, Deanna. The two have to pose as a happy, healthy family in order to get custody of Ryder because Jessica's mother, Viki, tries to keep him in her custody until Jessica comes back. The day before the trial, Tess visits Viki and tries to cause her a heart attack, resulting in Niki Smith, Viki's alter, coming out. Niki agrees to throw the trial and to give Tess and Ford the baby. After Viki fights with her alters and the judge deems Ford and Tess unfit parents, the custody of the baby almost goes to the commonwealth, but Joey and Aubrey decide step up and take the baby for temporary custody. Although they're falling in love, Ford attempts to bargain with Aubrey and Joey and tells them he will commit Tess for the baby. Joey and Aubrey leave with Ryder, and Ford calls St. Annes, angering Tess to the point that she hits him in the head with a lamp and thinks she killed him. Tess goes to Cutter so he can hide her. After learning that her husband is in fact alive, she marries Cutter so Ford cannot commit her. However, Cutter does commit Tess after he bargains with her father, Clint, for a piece of his fortune and his house. Tess goes to St. Anne's and realizes that she is in love with Ford after Bess, another of Jessica's alters, points it out. Meanwhile, James makes Ford realize he's in love with Tess. Ford goes to St. Anne's dressed as a nun to break her out, and they hide out at the Minute Man Motel. Tess and Ford make love, and Ford leaves to force Cutter to file for divorce. Cutter declines the offer, but his housemate, Rama Patel, blackmails him into doing it. Ford comes back to the motel and finds Tess gone. Jessica has come back, and Ford tries to convince her to let him see his son. An overwhelmed Jessica threatens to call the police if he does not leave her alone. On June 28, 2011, Ford abducts Jessica from the hospital and holds her hostage at the Minute Man Motel to plead for her to still let Ryder be a part of his life, and to make Tess come back out. After a while, Jessica pretends to be Tess and Ford removes her gag so she can talk. Jessica screams, alerting Aubrey and Rama, who both had just broken up with their husbands. They go check out Ford's room, so he reties Jessica's mouth and hides her and tells them everything's fine. When they leave, Ford realizes what he did was wrong, so he unties Jessica and tells her she can scream. She tells Ford that she won't turn him in, he did not rape her and that she's willing to negotiate for Ryder. John arrives after he realizes Jessica was abducted, but she tells him that she's fine and that he should leave. Ford gives Jessica a ride back to the hospital after they happen to catch the Fourth of July fireworks.

Later, Jessica and her sister Natalie Buchanan get in a fight and Jessica goes to Ford for comfort. He invites Jessica and Bree to the park with him and Ryder for a family date. James thinks Ford is falling for Jessica. Ford is hired to work at the premiere of "Vicker Man". Markko brags to Ford about his fame. Jessica told Ford that John not Brody, is Liam's father and Ford thinks Brody already knows.

Ford dies on January 9, 2012, after an altercation with Mitch Laurence leads a chandelier to fall on top of him.
