= Danielle Manning =

- One Life to Live character
- Portrayed by: Kelley Missal
- Duration: 2009–13
- First appearance: October 23, 2009
- Last appearance: August 19, 2013
- Created by: Ron Carlivati
- Introduced by: Frank Valentini; Jennifer Pepperman (2013)
In-universe information
- Other names: Danielle Rayburn
- Occupation: Paralegal; College student
- Family: Lord
- Father: Todd Manning
- Mother: Téa Delgado
- Stepparents: Victor Lord, Jr.; Ross Rayburn; Blair Cramer
- Siblings: Starr Manning; Jack Manning; Victor Lord III; Sam Manning (step)
- Grandparents: Leon Delgado; Anna Delgado; Victor Lord; Irene Manning; Peter Manning (adoptive); Bitsy Jones Manning (adoptive)
- Aunts and uncles: Anna Rose Delgado; José Delgado; Tina Lord; Victoria Lord; Tony Lord; Meredith Lord; Victor Lord, Jr.; Tomás Delgado
- Nieces and nephews: Hope Manning-Thornhart
- First cousins: C. J. Roberts; Sarah Roberts; Megan Gordon; Kevin Buchanan; Joey Buchanan; Jessica Buchanan; Natalie Buchanan; Brian Kendall; Daniel Wolek; Roseanne Delgado; Baz Moreau; Sam Manning; Victor Lord III

Danielle Manning is a fictional character from the American daytime drama One Life to Live. Created by writer Ron Carlivati, the role was originated on October 23, 2009 by Kelley Missal, who remained in the role through the ABC Daytime finale on January 12, 2012. Missal reprised the role when new daily episodes of One Life to Live debuted on Hulu, iTunes, and FX Canada via The Online Network April 29, 2013.

The character was conceived as part of her mother Téa Delgado's absence on the series from 2002 through 2008. Danielle was affected by SORAS, being aged several years after her supposed conception in 2002. Her revised birth date was October 20, 1994; in 2013, it was revealed Dani would be aged to 21.

== Background and reception ==
In 2009, Missal was cast in the role of the daughter of Téa Delgado and Todd Manning. Prior to landing the role, she had little television experience, one of her few roles being Saturday Night Live, in a sketch alongside Dan Aykroyd and Jimmy Fallon. When reading the script for Danielle Rayburn, Missal said she thought, "Oh, my goodness. This girl is a mixture of two cuh-razy [sic] characters...There's so much drama all the time, but I love it!" In a campaign supporting One Life to Live, TV Guide (Canada) writer Nelson Branco named Missal and the other youth on the show as one of the reasons the show was the best soap opera on air.

== Storylines ==
=== Backstory ===
In 2002, Todd Manning hires con man Ross Rayburn to aid him in the kidnapping of his children Starr and Jack Manning, during an estrangement with his ex-wife Blair Cramer. Todd's other ex-wife, Téa Delgado, catches wind of the plot and seeks to alert Blair. Extenuating circumstances, however, leave Todd, Ross and Téa stranded on an island in the South Pacific. During their cast away, Ross and Téa grow close while at odds with Todd. This, however, does not stop Todd and Téa from making love. When Téa later realizes that Todd is still in love with Blair, she gives him her blessing in seeking to escape the island in an attempt to reconcile with her. Téa opts to stay behind with Ross and waits to be rescued by the coastguard Todd promises to send if he makes it back home. They eventually are rescued. During their stay together, Téa and Ross embark on an impromptu relationship. Later, Téa discovers that she is pregnant, and assumes that the child is Ross's. The two later marry and move to Tahiti, where Danielle is born and raised, although Téa secretly questions her daughter's true paternity.

Téa's lingering feelings for Todd causes her marriage to fall apart. Eventually, Téa asks Ross for a divorce. Ross refuses her request, threatening to take Danielle away from her if she tries to leave him. To ensure that this does not happen, Téa enrolls a now-SORASed Danielle at the Warwick School—an exclusive boarding school in London—while keeping the location a closely guarded secret from her estranged husband. In December 2008, Téa returns to Llanview to make amends with Todd. As the two grow close, she secretly has a DNA test performed, which proves that Todd is indeed the father of Danielle. Later, Téa admits to Blair that she gave birth to a child, and that it is Todd's.

=== 2009–12 ===
At the Warwick School, Danielle meets Matthew Buchanan, who is from Llanview, and is also staying at the school as part of his parents plot to divert his attention away from having his neck surgery. They both share sorrows over disliking their parents, and, ironically, Matthew talks about his great lawyer, who happens to be Téa, while Dani talks about how her mother is a "shark" in the courtroom. Not knowing their real identities, the two become quick friends, and Danielle agrees to help Matthew escape and fly to Seattle, Washington, to have his surgery. However, Ross has teamed up with his brother Elijah Clarke to help locate Dani. He shows up to the Warwick School to see her, but they are already gone. Before Matthew can have his surgery, Téa and Elijah, and Matthew's parents, Bo Buchanan and Nora Hanen find them at the hospital. Téa and Elijah makes plans to leave Llanview in order to protect Dani, and she is forced to say goodbye to Matthew, with whom she had grown even closer to. Todd is also on Téa's trail, and finds out she is at the hospital. When she hears Todd arguing with Matthew's sister Rachel Gannon, Todd and Dani have a hostile confrontation and reveals to him that she is Téa's daughter. Realizing that he is more than likely her father, Todd leaves hurriedly to find Téa at the hotel, where Ross has attacked her after telling him that Dani is not his biological daughter. Todd arrives just in time to save Téa, who confirms to him that Dani is his daughter.

Ross, hurt and angry, kidnaps Blair Cramer and Dani. After being chased down and caught in a police standoff, Ross goes on a bridge and tries to get Danielle to come with him, and Todd shoots him. Thinking that Todd shot her father, Dani steals one of Bo Buchanan's guns and tries to shoot Todd, but he calms her down. Téa realizes how traumatized Danielle is about Ross's death and takes her home to Tahiti to mourn. During their time in Tahiti, Ross appears to Dani and reveals that he is alive. He tells Dani that Todd is her real father and wants her to accept him as her father. Danielle only promises to if Téa says she won't turn Ross in. She and Téa return to Llanview, and Téa rushes over to tell Todd that they are back. However, Dani searches for Todd on the internet and finds out secrets from his past. Matthew, looking for his sister Rachel, finds Dani and comforts her over her new-found information. To help ease her pain, Matthew takes her to meet her half-sister, Starr Manning, to help her understand who Todd is. Despite her negative views toward Todd, she develops relationships, with Starr, brothers Jack Manning and Sam Manning, and niece, Hope Manning-Thornhart. At first she develops an antagonistic relationship with Destiny Evans, because Destiny had a crush on Matthew and did not want him helping her to begin with. They later become best friends.

Todd and Téa's reunion is cut short when she leaves him due to Dani not being able to accept him. Dani and Matthew become closer, and they almost have sex, but Matthew cuts it short, as they are not ready and Dani is using it to vent feelings about her father. Over time, Dani and Todd begin to grow closer, as she continues to act out at school in order to get his attention. In a play at school based on the relationship of Starr and Cole Thornhart (Brandon Buddy), Dani won the role of her sister Starr after singing Miley Cyrus' "The Climb" in her audition. After playing out a scene between Todd and Starr in the play, and noticing Todd in the background, she realizes how Starr loves him and decides to give him a chance. During the play, Matthew notices Dani's close attraction to Nate Salinger (Lenny Platt), who is portraying Cole. Shortly after, Téa learns she has an inoperable brain tumor, meaning she has limited time to live. Téa keeps this from Danielle and attempts to get her and Todd to bond, realizing he will be all she has after Téa dies.

When she is going through a hard time, Dani, full of mixed emotions, kisses Nate. Destiny sees them, and she convinces her to tell Matthew. On the night of his parents' wedding, Dani tells Matthew the truth and they have a bad breakup in the church. Soon after, Dani begins a relationship with Nate, and while they are swimming at Llantano River, they find a briefcase full of money. Nate ends up hostage, and Dani turns to Todd for help for ransom money. In the aftermath of the hostage situation surrounding the money, Dani and Todd find Téa in the hospital and find out about her tumor. The three plan out Téa's last days, and Téa and Todd remarried on August 3, 2010. Soon after the wedding, Téa learns she has weeks to live and has an option of hospice. Téa decides to go there and says goodbye to Dani and Todd. Passing her necklace on to Dani, the family have a tearful goodbye. Dr. Greg Evans (Terrell Tilford) tells the duo days later that Tea has died. Starr orchestrates a memorial service as Llanview pays respect to Téa.

In the midst of Todd and Danielle finally having a relationship, Ross returns to Llanview, with a will stating that Tea gave custody of Dani to him. In reality, the will is a phony in a plot orchestrated by Elijah Clarke, and Téa wanted Blair, who had become her caretaker and confidant when she first learned of her illness, to adopt Dani. After a court battle, and Dani telling the court that her mother would want her with Todd, custody of Dani is given to Ross. Realizing she wants to be with her family in Llanview, Dani with the help of Starr, Nate, and James, escapes. However, the plan is adverted and Dani, Starr and Hope are kidnapped by Elijah. Elijah had also kidnapped Téa in the process, without Starr and Dani realizing. Starr escapes, but Eli holds Téa and Danielle in separate rooms in an abandoned warehouse. They would eventually find each other, but after the police try to intervene Blair giving herself up so that Elijah would leave the girls alone, Eli blows up the warehouse. Dani, who escaped, tells Todd that Téa is actually alive. Todd and John McBain (Michael Easton) find Téa and Blair in the warehouse. Upon their return to Llanview, they resume to becoming a family.

Nate later goes to jail when he was found guilty of Eddie Ford's murder. Dani cannot stand that her boyfriend is gone. A few weeks later they say that Nate was not the murderer of Eddie Ford. Dani throws him a welcome back party. Dani finds out about her uncle Tomas Delgado. She wonders why her mother never told her about him. On Valentines Day, Dani and Nate plan to sleep together for the first time. Todd walks in and realizes what was happening and almost attacks Nate. Todd forbids Dani from seeing Nate again. The two run away from home with the help of James. Starr finds out and she and James go get them. Todd finds all four of them. Dani and Destiny talk about Matthew being the real murderer. Nate overheard the conversation and went ballistic. He later knocks Matthew out which causes brain damage. Destiny and Dani do not know about this and try to find out what happened. Deanna Forbes, a person from James' past, comes to town. She is the only one that knows Nate's secret and plans to keep it that way. One day a man named Rick overhears Deanna and Nate's conversation. Days later he tells them to do a porno or Nate goes to jail. Dani knows nothing about this. Dani meets her cousin Baz Moreau, who is Tomas's son. Dani often tells Baz that it takes time to get along with a father she never knew. After Nate's graduation, she thinks something is going on between Nate and Deanna. Nate and Deanna decide to do what Rick says and make a porno because Nate doesn't want to go to jail and Deanna wants info on her mom. Dani missed most of Sam's Birthday party to talk to Nate. She finds Rick in the Minuteman Motel, where on other side are Nate and Deanna ready to shoot the film. Dani leaves and finds out Sam was kidnapped but was found thanks to her. The next day, Nate tells her Rick was a Lawyer and was giving Deanna Information about her mother and Deanna left to go to California. Dani tells him she was sorry for not trusting him. Rick comes by and talks a lot about porno's in his conversation with the two. Later that night, Dani and the other Mannings go to "Vickers Man", and she invites Nate. Dani later goes to Nate and tells him that the weird lawyer (Rick) was here. Nate tenses up with his lurking in the shadows. When the premiere finally starts Vicker Man does not come on; Hold the Diploma, the pornographic film with Nate and Deanna, airs instead. Everyone in the room finds out about it and is disgusted. Dani is shell-shocked about this. Nate tells her the reason why he did the pornographic film in the first place. On August 12, Dani said that she and Nate broke up and that she doesn't know if they will ever get back together.

She is now aware of the fact that the father she has known since she came to town might be an imposter. On October 14, 2011, Nate states that her birthday was in a couple of days and that she would be 17. On October 17, 2011, Dani agrees to go on a date with Nate, making clear that she wants to take things slow. On October 20, at midnight, Tea wishes Dani a happy 17th birthday.

In June 2012, when Téa crossed over to General Hospital, she calls Dani to tell her that she gave birth to her brother, Victor Lord III. Danielle and Jack have an estranged relationship with their father Todd as a result of believing him guilty for the murder of their uncle Victor, the man they both considered their father. On September 10, 2012, Téa confirms that Danielle has started attending college outside of Llanview. In October 2012, John mentions that Dani is home from college with Téa, who has just found out that the baby she was raising as her son belonged to Sam Morgan, and Téa's son was actually stillborn. In March 2013, Dani calls Todd twice possibly to berate him over him being found not guilty in the baby switch, but the calls Dani makes are spotty and are abruptly cut short. Later, Todd leaves Port Charles, presumably due to the phone calls.

=== 2013 ===
Dani is now 21 years old and living with her mother, and it is revealed that she has been getting drunk on alcohol and high on pills. Matthew figures out and takes her pills, but Dani passes out on the opening night of Blair's new nightclub Shelter due to a drug overdose. At the hospital, Todd, Téa, and Blair find out about Dani using when Matthew tells the doctor about taking OxyContin pills. Soon after, Victor is revealed to be alive and reunites with Téa & Dani, hoping to help her out. Dani later reveals she has been taking drugs because Todd was gone, and Téa has been ignoring her since she lost Victor's baby. She made the calls to Todd while she was drunk. On May 9, Dani moves out of Tea's house and moves to an apartment with Matthew and their friend from their boarding school days in London, Jeffrey King.

In 2019, Nora Buchanan mentions that Dani is now working for her as a paralegal researcher. Dani is responsible for locating precedent case allowing the charges against Dr. Kevin Collins to be dropped.
