= Destiny Evans =

Fictional character Destiny Evans from One Life to Live

- One Life to Live character
- Laura Harrier as Destiny Evans
- Portrayed by: Shenell Edmonds (2009–12); Laura Harrier (2013)
- Duration: 2009–13
- First appearance: February 27, 2009
- Last appearance: August 19, 2013
- Created by: Ron Carlivati
- Introduced by: Frank Valentini; Jennifer Pepperman (2013)
- Shenell Edmonds as Destiny Evans
In-universe information
- Other names: Destiny Loretta Evans
- Occupation: College student; Advertising runner for The Banner
- Parents: Greg Evans; Charlene
- Adoptive parents: Richard Evans; Phylicia Evans
- Brothers: Greg Evans (adoptive); Shaun Evans (adoptive)
- Sons: Drew Buchanan II
- Grandparents: Richard Evans; Phylicia Evans; Fred Wenton (legal)
- Aunts and uncles: Shaun Evans

Destiny Evans is a fictional character from the American soap opera One Life to Live.

== Casting ==
The role of Destiny was originated by actress Shenell Edmonds, who made her first appearance on February 27, 2009. Edmonds' Destiny was upgraded from a recurring role to a series regular in May 2010, remaining in such a capacity until the original OLTL finale on ABC Daytime January 13, 2012.

When Prospect Park resumed production of the series in January 2013, Shenell Edmonds was unavailable to reprise her role due to her school schedule. The character was subsequently recast to newcomer Laura Harrier, who stepped into the role when new daily episodes of OLTL debuted on Hulu, iTunes, and FX Canada via The Online Network April 29, 2013.

== Storylines ==
Destiny Evans (Edmonds) first appears as budding friend to Llanview High School classmate Matthew Buchanan (Eddie Alderson) in February 2009. She soon develops a crush on Matthew, who was the subject of bullying at the time. After an incident where he is embarrassed at a school dance, an angry Matthew gets into a car with a high Cole who drives and causes a car crash which leaves him paralyzed. In the wake of the accident, Destiny becomes Matthew's confidante. Meanwhile, Destiny soon interrogates protective older brother Shaun (Sean Ringgold) on the whereabouts of their miracle-worker surgeon and brother Dr. Greg Evans with the hopes he could help Matthew, but Shaun rebuffs her requests.

In June 2009, Dr. Greg Evans (Terrell Tilford) arrives in fictional Llanview after Matthew and Destiny press Matthew's uncle Clint (Jerry verDorn) to pay for the consultation and treatment. When Bo (Robert S. Woods) and Nora Buchanan (Hillary B. Smith) refuse to authorize Dr. Evans to perform risky spinal surgery on minor Matthew, Destiny convinces Matthew to hire known firebrand attorney Téa Delgado (Florencia Lozano) to sue for the right to pursue the surgery. Destiny is elated when Matthew wins in court, but the two are then perturbed when a weary Greg refuses to perform the operation. Matthew finds another surgeon in Seattle, so reluctant parents Bo and Nora trick Matthew into using a Buchanan private jet believing he was flying to surgery, with all of them going instead to London. Destiny, tending to a wounded Shaun at Llanview Hospital, attempted to contact Matthew to no avail.

With the help of Matthew's newly found empathetic brother David Vickers Buchanan (Tuc Watkins), David and Destiny fly to London where they encounter Bo, Nora, and Matthew, as well Destiny's first meeting with Téa Delgado's estranged daughter Danielle "Dani" Rayburn (Kelley Missal). Matthew, Dani, and later Destiny leave for Seattle for Matthew's surgery, which is successful.

Destiny finally reveals her romantic feeling for Matthew New Year's Eve 2009, only to have her feeling unrequited. Destiny later uncovers the shocking news that Charlene, her brother Shaun's dead ex-girlfriend, was her biological mother and her actual father was her believed brother, Dr. Greg Evans. Criminal evidence soon implicates Greg in Charlene's wrongful death and the disposal of her dead body. Upon knowledge that her believed parents, Richard (Frankie Faison) and Phylicia Evans (Tonye Patano), were her actual grandparents and withheld knowledge of the circumstances of her mother's death, Destiny seeks Téa's counsel on emancipation and the support of Matthew and Dani.

Soon after sharing their first kiss January 24, 2011, Matthew reveals to Destiny his tormenting secret that he killed Eddie Ford (John Wesley Shipp) after the near-miss car accident. Destiny comforts Matthew, after which he leads her to his bedroom where they lose their virginity to one another. Destiny avoids Matthew after they both had sex, and Matthew later finds Destiny to tell her their intimate time together was special to him.

While in Angel Square, Dani happens upon Matthew and Destiny kissing. Destiny soon reveals to Dani they had sex and that Matthew confided that he killed Eddie. Eddie's estranged son, Nate Salinger (Lenny Platt), overhears Destiny's revelation and goes to Bo's apartment where he punches Matthew, causing him to hit his head and suffer a concussion. Destiny visits a still lucid Matthew after the incident, offering him an aspirin for a growing headache. Matthew collapses before his parents, who take him to the hospital. Nora calls Destiny over to the hospital. Destiny, joined by Dani, Bo and Nora, and a clandestine Nate learn Matthew to be nearly brain dead with minimal chance of recovery.

In summer 2011, Matthew's longtime friend Starr Manning (Kristen Alderson) finds Destiny with a pregnancy test which Destiny tells her is for a friend. With Matthew still sick and Starr and Dani suspecting her to be pregnant, Destiny takes the test, revealing her to have conceived Matthew's child. In August, Destiny receives permission to have an abortion from legal mother Phylicia. But, Nora soon learns the news of Destiny carrying her first grandchild and begs Destiny not to abort the baby with the promise she and Bo would support her. Destiny keeps the child.

By November, Matthew miraculously recovers from the accident, and Destiny divulges her pregnancy to him. Matthew reacts unfavorably to the news, soon lashing out at Nora for guilting Destiny into keeping the child. At the series finale, Matthew finally warms up to the idea of fatherhood. Destiny, surrounded by family, gives birth to a son, whom she and Matthew name after Bo's late son, Drew Buchanan II.

In 2013, Destiny (Laura Harrier) is aged to a 21-year-old college student and single mother to Drew, acknowledging Matthew's (Robert Gorrie) limited parental involvement and his parents Bo and Nora providing support with financial assistance and babysitting to the child.

== Reception ==
For her role as Destiny, Shenell Edmonds was nominated for an NAACP Image Award for Best Actress in a Daytime Drama Series in 2013.
