= List of One Life to Live characters introduced in the 2010s =

This is a list of characters from the ABC Daytime–Prospect Park soap opera, One Life to Live, that began their run between the beginning of 2010 and the final cancelation of the show.

== Tomás Delgado ==
Tomás Delgado
- One Life to Live character
- Portrayed by: Ted King
- Duration: 2011–12
- First appearance: January 21, 2011
- Last appearance: January 13, 2012
- Created by: Ron Carlivati
- Introduced by: Frank Valentini
In-universe information
- Occupation: Artist; CIA agent
- Parents: Leon Delgado; Anna Delgado
- Siblings: Téa Delgado
- Spouse: Yvette Moreau (1986–)
- Children: Sebastian "Baz" Moreau
- Grandparents: Maria Delgado
- Nieces and nephews: Roseanne Delgado; Danielle Manning; Victor Lord III
- First cousins: Enrique Delgado

Tomás Delgado is a fictional character on the American soap opera One Life to Live. Ted King played the role from January 21, 2011 until the series finale in January 2012. Executive Producer at the time Frank Valentini offered King the opportunity to co-create the character with him and headwriter Ron Carlivati, which helped convince King to join One Life to Live.

Tomás is first seen on January 21, 2011, as a struggling Parisian artist. He is found by Blair Cramer and Cristian Vega who are looking for the artist who painted Blair's portrait eight years prior. He admits to Blair that he found a photo of her from her wedding to Todd Manning at the Marché aux puces flea market from which he painted her portrait. Intrigued by Blair, Tomás goes to Llanview to see her in February, and it becomes clear that Blair has feelings for Tomás. It is soon revealed that he is Tomás Delgado, the brother of Téa Delgado. Tomás is concerned about his sister's marriage to Todd Manning and stays in town to protect her. When Todd is shot, Tomás eventually becomes a suspect and is arrested. After Tomás threatens to blackmail Todd, Tomás and Todd broker an uneasy alliance.

In June 2011, Tomás goes to New York, secretly followed by Blair. She finds out he is married, but separated. They both discover that Sebastian "Baz" Moreau is his biological son. After being interrogated by John McBain, Téa, and Blair, Tomás reveals that he was once an agent for the CIA. Years ago, he was ordered to execute Todd, but when he found him nearly beaten to death, he brought him to the agency instead. Tomás was led to believe that Todd had ties to terrorists. He discovered that his agency went rogue, and he left with the aid of another agent of the CIA. Tomás painted Blair's portrait from her photo with Todd, feeling remorse over his actions. Tomás admits that Todd was targeted by Baker, an old associate from the rogue branch of the CIA, and stopped Baker from executing Todd, which is why Todd originally assumed that Tomás was responsible for shooting him. Tomás and Todd establish an uneasy truce in order to protect Téa and the family from suffering any reprisals because of Todd's previous dealings with Baker. At the premiere of Vickerman, Tomás announces that Todd is an impostor just as a man arrives claiming to be the real Todd Manning. Tomás later admits to Blair that he is not certain which of the two men is the real one.

In August 2011, Brody Lovett and Tomás, led by McBain, infiltrate the agency headquarters and discover that the director of the agency is Irene Manning. It is eventually revealed that the new man is indeed the real Todd Manning, while the impostor is Todd's twin brother Victor Lord, Jr., brainwashed by Irene into thinking that he was Todd. Tomás stumbles upon a dead Irene, with Todd holding the gun. Tomás, who blamed himself for taking Todd years ago, takes the blame for killing Irene. Tomás accepts his fate, feeling remorseful over his past actions, but Todd eventually admits that he killed Irene.

After months of Tomás trying to establish a relationship with his difficult son, Baz eventually leaves town to return to Europe to pursue a career in music. Tomás makes a promise to Téa to discover who murdered Victor Lord Jr. Realizing that Blair still has feelings for Todd, he keeps her in the dark about his suspicions. Todd, now funding a new Clandestine operation, kidnaps Tomás. Todd plants evidence to frame Tomás for the murder of Victor Lord Jr, and keeps Tomás hostage. Todd uses the opportunity to make Blair believe that Tomás was responsible for killing Victor, and reignites their relationship when Blair believes Tomás' coerced confession. Téa and McBain suspect that Tomás is innocent, and investigate Todd as the suspect in Victor's murder. McBain eventually locates Tomás and arrests Todd for the kidnapping of Tomás and the murder of Victor. Blair and Tomás seem to reconcile, and the entire town ostracizes Todd for his role in Victor's apparent murder, and his attempts to frame Tomás. Tomás and Blair console Téa after she found out that her son was stillborn, and she had been raising the son of Sam Morgan for months.

On the November 30, 2012, episode of General Hospital, Carly Corinthos and Skye Quartermaine go to Blair with news that Tomás may be Lorenzo Alcazar. Shortly thereafter, a CIA agent arrives to tell them Tomás has left on a mission. Skye, Blair and Téa leave in search of Tomás.

== Eddie Ford ==
Eddie Ford
- One Life to Live character
- Portrayed by: John Wesley Shipp
- Duration: 2010–12
- First appearance: November 8, 2010
- Last appearance: January 9, 2012
- Created by: Ron Carlivati
- Introduced by: Frank Valentini
In-universe information
- Occupation: Criminal
- Spouse: Inez Salinger (pre-2010)
- Children: Robert Ford; James Ford; Nate Salinger
- Grandchildren: Ryder Ford

Edward "Eddie" Ford is a fictional character on the American soap opera One Life to Live. He is the abusive ex-husband of Inez Salinger and father of Robert "Bobby" Ford, James Ford, and Nate Salinger. John Wesley Shipp was hired for the limited contract role, first appearing on November 8, 2010. He last appeared on December 15, 2010, briefly returning to film flashback scenes in April 2011, and during the series finale week in January 2012. When asked about his character, Shipp stated that "there are three things that make Eddie dangerous. One, he has nothing to lose. Two, he's willing to do anything and everything to anyone to punch his way out of a corner when he feels trapped. And three, Eddie always feels trapped."

In November 2010, Eddie shows up at the doorstep of his two eldest sons, Bobby and James. Eddie had previously been in jail in Ohio. Eddie asks James for the $50,000 James had stolen from him, and threatens to have James sent to jail unless they agree to let Eddie stay at their apartment. When James defends Inez, Eddie realizes that Inez has been in contact with her sons. When Inez arrives, she is shocked to see Eddie. Eddie assumes Nate is Inez's lover, but she tells him Nate is their son, which Eddie doubts. He lashes out at Inez for leaving him, and Inez says she regrets running away, but will protect them from his abuse now.

Bo Buchanan pays Eddie a visit and warns him that the police are watching him. Eddie follows his sons to Dorian Lord's house on Thanksgiving and crashes her gathering. When he is ordered to leave, Eddie has an outburst, insulting Starr Manning and punching James in the face before being physically restrained by Bobby. Dorian calls the police and has Eddie arrested. Eddie meets Nora Buchanan and insinuates that Bo and Inez are having an affair. Eddie is released by the aide of a high-priced lawyer hired by Clint Buchanan. Nate punches Eddie after he makes suggestive remarks to Nate's girlfriend, Danielle Manning.

Eddie is summoned to the Buchanan mansion, where Clint promises to pay Eddie a large sum of cash and gives him a gun. In return, Clint has Eddie kidnap Nora and send text messages from her phone telling Bo to sleep with Inez to even the score over her affair years before with Sam Rappaport. While Eddie holds Nora hostage, he almost rapes her. Eventually, James confronts his father and holds him at gunpoint, but is unable to bring himself to shoot him. Instead he warns his father to leave town before someone else kills him. Soon Eddie is found dead in his hotel room, and it is eventually discovered that Clint murdered him to cover his tracks. However, on April 1, 2011, Clint reveals to Bo and Nora that their son Matthew Buchanan was the one who killed Eddie.

On January 9, 2012, Eddie appears to Ford when he has an out-of-body experience. Ford awakens in Hell and is told by Eddie he is there because he raped Jessica. While Ford gives a speech about redemption, he pushes Eddie into the fire while making a break for Heaven.

== James Ford ==
James Ford
- One Life to Live character
- Portrayed by: Nic Robuck
- Duration: 2010–12
- First appearance: June 9, 2010
- Last appearance: January 11, 2012
- Created by: Ron Carlivati
- Introduced by: Frank Valentini
In-universe information
- Occupation: Auto mechanic; Student at Llanview University
- Parents: Eddie Ford; Inez Salinger
- Brothers: Robert Ford; Nate Salinger
- Nephews: Ryder Ford

James Ford is a fictional character from the ABC original soap opera, One Life to Live. The role was played by Nic Robuck from June 9, 2010, to January 11, 2012. Robuck revealed in an interview with ABC Daytime that his pairing with Starr (Kristen Alderson) was a big hit with fans, stating: "We have fans that wait outside the studio every day with pictures, and they talk about the storyline. They always ask, 'Are you and Starr going to get together?' I always tell them, 'You'll just have to wait and see." Originally, Robuck was just supposed to be brought as Starr's new love interest, but when the writers noticed the resemblance between himself and co-star David A. Gregory, who plays Robert Ford, they made them brothers.

James and his brother were raised in Dayton, Ohio. Their father was a criminal who ran a chop shop and forced James to work on his crew when he was 15. Robert got a scholarship for film school and moved to California, leaving James alone with his father. In order to escape, James stole $50,000 from his father; his father sent one of his thugs, Bull, after him.

James is first seen as a stranger talking to Starr Manning about the problems in their lives. James is later revealed to be the brother of Robert Ford, who is nearly beaten to death. James's voice helps Ford regain consciousness. When the police arrive to question his brother, James leaves and encounters Bull. James finds his way to the parking garage, where he finds Starr, who is having car trouble. James fixes her car, but Bull finally catches up to him and James demands that Starr get in the car with him. As they speed away, Starr loses her purse.

The two escape to her aunt’s cabin, where James opens up about his father. James tells her that he stole $50,000 from his father. Starr and James decide the only way to get the money is to steal a car worth as much as he owes Bull. After stealing a car, the two wind up in an accident after Starr's attempt to keep James from hitting an animal causes them to crash into a tree. James decides to surrender to Bull, promising to work off the money he owes. Though he tells her to stay away, Starr follows him to the abandoned barn where he is meeting Bull. Starr's father Todd Manning also arrives with $50,000 in exchange for his other daughter, Dani's boyfriend, Nate Salinger. The situation starts to unravel; as Bull and Todd fight, James picks up a shovel and attempts to knock Bull out as Starr grabs Bull's gun and accidentally shoots James. James makes it through surgery, and, shortly after, he tells Starr he has feelings for her. Starr tells James that they can never see one another again. James learns that Nate's mother, Inez is the mother who abandoned him and Bobby when they were kids. He begins dating Langston Wilde to make Starr jealous. Starr, James, and Langston all enroll in Llanview University around the same time and are surprised to learn the Ford is teaching a class that they are all taking. When Starr learns from Robert that her mother's fiancée, Elijah Clarke is actually a serial killer and her boyfriend Cole Thornhart knew about it, she is furious; James goes to comfort her.

Brody Lovett shows up at LU and beat up Ford for sleeping with Jessica while she was not in her right mind. This upsets Langston, so she pretends to give Ford a second chance and secretly has photos taken of the two of them making out. She sends the pictures to the dean and gets Ford fired.

James loses his chance on education once Ford gets fired from his teaching position. Thanks to Clint Buchanan, Ford gets his job back after Clint made a call to the Dean, and James is able to stay in school.

Starr, Dani, and Hope are kidnapped by Elijah Clarke; Starr gets away. When Hannah goes through with her plans to get rid of Starr and Hope for good, James catches on and decides to handle it. He finds Starr trapped in the attic of Hannah's home in Delaware. Hannah has them dress up in Halloween costumes and takes them to the cemetery where she forces them to dig their own graves at gunpoint. She knocks James out and makes Starr bury him alive. As Hannah is about to bury Starr, James rises from the grave and distracts Hannah long enough for Starr to bash her unconscious with a shovel. The two subsequently turn her in to the police. When Cole kills Elijah believing that Starr and Hope were trapped in the building he just blew, James tries to help Starr and Cole run. Cole turns himself in and is sentenced to 10 years in prison; Starr is heartbroken. James comforts her and tries to help her forget about her problems.

When Eddie shows up in town, Bobby and James are forced to let him live with them because James will go to jail for stealing the $50,000 from him. Eddie picks up right where he left off and continues terrorizing James. On November 24, James and Ford attend the Cramer family Thanksgiving celebration and Eddie crashes it. After Eddie punches James in front of everyone, he is arrested. Starr convinces James that he doesn't have to live in fear of his father anymore and they spend Thanksgiving with her family.

Later, James becomes furious at Eddie for his action and confronts him at his hotel room at gunpoint. Though he nearly does so, James realizes that he cannot put Starr through the same ordeal that she went through when Cole was arrested and diverts his aim. He warns his father to leave town before he changes his mind or before someone else attempts to do so. James also dates a girl named Michelle to get over Starr. They almost have sex but stop because his heart belongs to Starr. It is revealed that he and Nate are the paternal uncles of Ryder Ford (Robert's son with Jessica Buchanan). On February 28, 2011, James and Starr become a couple. On August 10, 2011, James and Starr have sex for the first time.

On January 3, 2012, James goes to Starr's house to warn her that Cole has broken out of prison and wonders if she has seen him. Starr assures him that she has not, and James leaves. Later he returns, suspicious that Starr is hiding something. Sure enough, James walks in on Starr and Cole as they profess their love for one another. On January 10, realizing that Starr will never stop loving Cole, James breaks up with her.

== Ryder Ford ==
Ryder Ford
- One Life to Live character
- Duration: 2011–12
- First appearance: January 11, 2011
- Last appearance: January 12, 2012
- Created by: Ron Carlivati
- Introduced by: Frank Valentini
In-universe information
- Family: Lord; Buchanan
- Parents: Robert Ford; Jessica Buchanan
- Siblings: Bree Brennan
- Grandparents: Eddie Ford; Inez Salinger; Clint Buchanan; Victoria Lord
- Aunts and uncles: James Ford; Nate Salinger; Cord Roberts; Megan Gordon; Kevin Buchanan; Joey Buchanan; Natalie Buchanan; Rex Balsom
- First cousins: Liam McBain; Duke Buchanan; Shane Balsom; Starr Manning; Danielle Manning; Jack Manning; Sam Manning; C. J. Roberts; Sarah Roberts; Daniel Wolek; Brian Kendall; David Vickers Buchanan; Drew Buchanan; Matthew Buchanan

Ryder Asa Ford (born Lovett) is a fictional character on the American soap opera One Life to Live. He is the son of Jessica Buchanan and Robert Ford. Child actors Matthew and Nicholas Urbanowics played the role from January through October 2011, and Cory and Dominick from October 2011 until the series ended in January 2012.

Ryder is born on January 11, 2011. Though Jessica is initially unsure whether the father is Robert Ford or Brody Lovett, a paternity test confirms that the baby is Brody's. However, on February 9, 2011, Vimal Patel reveals that Ford is Ryder's biological father, and that he had altered the paternity test on orders from Clint Buchanan. Jessica is unable to bear this, and reverts to her alternate personality, Tess. She devises a scheme with Ford to get custody of Ryder. However, when Jessica's family becomes aware, they sue for temporary custody. In the end, Joey Buchanan and Aubrey Wentworth are granted custody. On June 16, 2011, Jessica returns and takes custody of Ryder, and agrees that Ford may see him whenever he wants. On January 9, 2012, Ford dies following an altercation with Mitch Laurence.

== Liam McBain ==
Liam McBain
- One Life to Live character
- Portrayed by: Finn Robbins (2013); (and others)
- Duration: 2011–13
- First appearance: January 11, 2011
- Last appearance: August 19, 2013
- Created by: Ron Carlivati
- Introduced by: Frank Valentini
In-universe information
- Family: Lord; Buchanan
- Parents: John McBain; Natalie Buchanan
- Grandparents: Thomas McBain; Eve McBain; Clint Buchanan; Victoria Lord; Roxy Balsom (adoptive)
- Aunts and uncles: Michael McBain; Theresa; Cord Roberts; Megan Gordon; Kevin Buchanan; Joey Buchanan; Jessica Buchanan; Rex Balsom
- First cousins: Gabriel McBain; Unnamed McBain; Bree Brennan; Ryder Ford; Duke Buchanan; Shane Balsom; Starr Manning; Danielle Manning; Jack Manning; Sam Manning; C. J. Roberts; Sarah Roberts; Daniel Wolek; Brian Kendall; David Vickers Buchanan; Drew Buchanan; Matthew Buchanan

Liam Asa McBain is a fictional character on the American soap opera One Life to Live. Christian and Gavin McGinley appeared alternately in the infant role from January 2011 until January 12, 2012. The role was last played by Finn Robbins from April 29, 2013, to August 19 of the same year.

Liam is the son of Natalie Buchanan and John McBain, born on January 11, 2011. Natalie is initially unsure whether her unborn child's father is Brody Lovett or John; a paternity test shows that Brody is the father. Terrified of John's reaction, Natalie hides the truth. After the baby is born, Marty Saybrooke kidnaps him, but John gets him back.

Liam's paternity test results are revealed at Natalie and John’s wedding. A betrayed John leaves Natalie, and Brody takes the role of Liam's father. During a recorded therapy session, Marty reveals that she switched the paternity results and that John is Liam’s father. Brody gets ahold of the tape recorder, but erases it to keep Liam. During Natalie and Brody's wedding, it comes out that John is Liam's father and Brody kidnaps him. Brody gives back Liam and he is reunited with his parents.

== Sierra Morasco ==
Sierra Morasco
- One Life to Live character
- Portrayed by: Sophia & Audrina Misicone
- First appearance: February 11, 2010
- Last appearance: April 12, 2010
- Introduced by: Frank Valentini
In-universe information
- Parents: Stacy Morasco; Oliver Fish
- Grandparents: George Fish; Barbara Fish
- Aunts and uncles: Gigi Morasco
- First cousins: Shane Balsom

Sierra Rose Morasco Fish is a fictional character on the American soap opera One Life to Live. She is the daughter of Oliver Fish and Stacy Morasco, born on February 11, 2010.

In love with her sister Gigi Morasco's boyfriend, Rex Balsom, Stacy blackmails Gigi into breaking up with him. Rex and Gigi are eventually reunited, but Stacy and Rex have already slept together, and Stacy is pregnant. She miscarries, but keeps the truth from Rex knowing that it is her only hold over him. Stacy plots to get pregnant again in order to pass the baby off as Rex's. She becomes pregnant after seducing a drunken Oliver Fish, but tells Schuyler Joplin that the baby is his. Schuyler agrees to keep the truth from Rex so that he can have Gigi for himself. Rex's biological father, Mitch Laurence, kidnaps Stacy, intending to raise her baby as his heir. When she reveals that the baby is not Rex's, Mitch abandons Stacy in a blizzard. Gigi finds her and helps Stacy deliver a baby girl, whom she names Sierra Rose. Gigi rushes off to the hospital with a newborn Sierra; Stacy tries to follow, but falls through the ice of a frozen lake. She is presumed dead. Sierra is later diagnosed with a congenital heart defect requiring immediate surgery. It is revealed to Gigi, Schuyler and Rex that the baby's real father is Oliver, and he is awarded legal custody.

== Hannah O'Connor ==
Hannah O’Connor
- One Life to Live character
- Portrayed by: Meghann Fahy
- Duration: 2010–12
- First appearance: February 25, 2010
- Last appearance: January 6, 2012
- Created by: Ron Carlivati
- Introduced by: Frank Valentini
In-universe information
- Occupation: Student at Llanview University; Inmate

Hannah O'Connor is a fictional character on the American soap opera One Life to Live. The role was portrayed by Meghann Fahy on a recurring status from February 25, 2010, through November 1, 2010, and again in January 2012.

Hannah O'Connor arrives in Llanview in 2010 as Cole Thornhart's project partner. She is revealed to be Robert Ford's ex-flame in March and she wants him back. After several attempts to bring Ford back, Hannah loses hope and overdoses on pills. Cole finds Hannah passed out from the pills and helps her through her troubles, suggesting that she see his mom, Marty Saybrooke for counseling. In April, Hannah comes to Cole's apartment to see Cole. After spilling coffee on her shirt, Hannah takes her shirt off to clean it. Todd Manning sees Hannah and Cole together and attacks Cole, causing drama between Cole and his girlfriend, Starr Manning.

Marty is pushed down a flight of stairs, and miscarries her unborn baby as a result of the attack. Hannah claims that she saw Starr's father Todd attack Marty. Both Starr and Todd disagrees and thinks Hannah is using her seeing who pushed Marty to break up Starr and Cole so Hannah can have Cole to herself. Hannah then is accused of having tried to kill Ford, so she uses Cole and tells him Starr is dating a man named James Ford who she has just met. Hannah leads Cole to her old home in Delaware. Hannah then pretends Starr and James slept together, so this causes Cole to be depressed and kiss Hannah. Cole stops the kiss and escapes with Hannah when she is found by the police. Cole and Hannah head to a motel in Maryland where they run into Cris and Layla. John McBain and Natalie Buchanan soon arrive and place Hannah under arrest for the attempted murder of Robert.

Hannah hires Elijah "Eli" Clarke as her lawyer, knowing he was the one who pushed Marty down the stairs. When they talk, Elijah threatens Hannah saying, confess to pushing Marty down the stairs so Cole won't get hurt. Hannah fakes a breakdown and is sent to St. Anne's. She then continues to lie about Eli's crimes and Eli points a gun at Hannah and forces her to take several pain killer pills and is knocked out unconscious. She is revived by her doctors. While in her room alone, John asks Hannah what's really going on between her and Eli, and finally reveals what Eli has been holding over her and reveals to John that Eli had not only held her at gunpoint but also forced her to take the pills or Eli was going to hurt Cole, and did it to save Cole and it was the only way to save him from danger. Hannah finally reveals to John that Eli pushed Marty down the flight of stairs and was being blackmailed into faking a breakdown and was forced to swallow a bottle of pills that could've killed her if Cole hadn't saved her. Hannah also told John that Eli attacked Ford. John assures Hannah that Eli will be brought to justice.

Later Marty visits Hannah and she apologize to Marty for all the trouble she caused her. Later in Hannah's court hearing, Marty volunteers to bring Hannah to her house and live with her under her care. Marty forgives her and tells her that she's going to have a good life. However, Hannah kidnaps Starr and Hope after they escape Eli, who had been holding them and Dani hostage, intending to kill them so she can have Cole all to herself. James Ford gets suspicious of Hannah and confronts her, but before he can call the cops she knocks him out with her father's pistol and kidnaps him as well. Hannah takes them all to the cemetery and forces James and Starr to dig their own graves at gunpoint before forcing Starr to bury James alive. Just as Hannah is about to do the same to Starr, James digs himself out of the grave and attacks her, managing to distract her long enough for Starr to bash her unconscious with a shovel, with the police arriving just in time to arrest her.

James accompanies the police and Hannah to the station, where Marty, having confessed to Eli's murder to protect Cole, watches them enter. James informs them of everything that Hannah has done. Hannah pleads with Marty to help her avoid prison time and get better, but instead, a shocked and furious Marty disowns her, coldly informing her that she is insane beyond fixing and that it was a mistake to ever trust her. Hannah is last seen being dragged away by the police, vocally bemoaning her circumstances.

In January 2012, a breakout occurs in Statesville prison, and Hannah escapes to take revenge on Starr and James. She accidentally shoots Cole while trying to shoot Starr. Hannah is taken back to Statesville by the police.

== Rama Patel ==
Rama Patel
- One Life to Live character
- Portrayed by: Shenaz Treasury
- Duration: 2011–13
- First appearance: January 20, 2011
- Last appearance: August 19, 2013
- Created by: Ron Carlivati
- Introduced by: Frank Valentini; Jennifer Pepperman (2013)
In-universe information
- Occupation: VIP Hostess at Shelter nightclub (2013–); Manicurist at Foxy Roxy's Hair Haven (2011–12)
- Spouse: Vimal Patel

Rama Patel is a fictional character on the American soap opera One Life to Live. The role was portrayed by Shenaz Treasury from January 20, 2011, until the series finale in January 2012. Treasury resumed the role as a series regular when new daily episodes of One Life to Live debuted via The Online Network on April 29, 2013.

== Inez Salinger ==
Inez Salinger
- One Life to Live character
- Portrayed by: Jessica Leccia
- Duration: 2010–11
- First appearance: June 18, 2010
- Last appearance: May 4, 2011
- Created by: Ron Carlivati
- Introduced by: Frank Valentini
In-universe information
- Other names: Inez Ford
- Occupation: Assistant to Police Commissioner Bo Buchanan
- Spouse: Eddie Ford (pre-2010)
- Sons: Robert Ford; James Ford; Nate Salinger
- Grandsons: Ryder Ford

Inez Salinger (formerly Ford) is a fictional character on the American soap opera One Life to Live. The role was played by actress Jessica Leccia from June 18, 2010, until May 4, 2011.

Inez Salinger was introduced in June 2010 as the struggling mother of Nate Salinger. In an effort to help his mother with her financial struggles, Nate gave her $50,000 worth of stolen money that he found in the woods. It soon became clear that the money had been stolen from the father of Ford brothers, James and Robert, who were also revealed to be Inez's sons. Inez had been forced to abandon the boys as children due to an abusive relationship with her husband and the boys' father.

Although James didn't recognize Inez when she returned the money that belonged to him, Robert pushed Inez away and refused to forgive her. Feeling desperate, Inez confided her troubled past to Bo Buchanan after he pulled her over for erratic driving. Bo subsequently offered the financially troubled Inez a job working for him as his assistant. As of fall 2010, Bo's brother Clint has begun courting Inez, making her a potential love interest. He has helped out her family financially on several occasions, including her nearly-estranged son Robert Ford. It is revealed that she's the paternal grandmother of Ryder Ford.

Eventually, Inez becomes a pawn of Clint's revenge plot against Bo and Nora Buchanan. Clint bails Eddie, James and Robert's abusive father, out of jail and blackmails Inez into helping him with his plans, simultaneously having Eddie kidnap Nora and hold her hostage for a few hours while Inez seduces Bo. While Inez drugs Bo, she is unable to bring herself to actually have sex with him and instead allows him to believe as such. Nora is rescued by Rex Balsom, while Eddie is murdered in his hotel room hours later.

Nate takes the blame for Eddie's murder, though many people have their doubts. After his trial, Bo and Nora confront Inez over her attempt to seduce Bo, and Inez admits that she had been forced to do so by Clint. Initially skeptical, Bo and Nora realize that Inez is telling the truth upon looking at the evidence; namely, the high-priced lawyer assigned to Eddie when he assaulted James at Thanksgiving, and the fact that Clint had earlier threatened them with a shotgun. However, they nonetheless have Inez arrested for drugging Bo. Before she is taken away, Nora tells Inez that, while she had been forced to do all of this by Clint, the fact that she never bothered to simply come to them in the first place has convinced her that she was also, at least partly, trying to break them up of her own free will.

== Nate Salinger ==
Nate Salinger
- One Life to Live character
- Portrayed by: Lenny Platt
- Duration: 2010–12
- First appearance: April 12, 2010
- Last appearance: January 10, 2012
- Created by: Ron Carlivati
- Introduced by: Frank Valentini
In-universe information
- Other names: Buster Ridge (porn stage name)
- Occupation: City maintenance worker; College student; Porn actor
- Parents: Eddie Ford; Inez Salinger
- Brothers: Robert Ford; James Ford
- Nephews: Ryder Ford

Nate Salinger is a fictional character from the ABC original soap opera One Life to Live. The role was portrayed by Lenny Platt from April 12, 2010, to January 10, 2012.

Nate was first seen at Llanview High School, where he meets Danielle Rayburn, Matthew Buchanan and Destiny Evans while auditioning for the school musical "Starr X'd Lovers". Nate eventually beats Matthew for the role of Cole Thornhart and Danielle wins the role of Starr Manning. Nate and Dani become close even though she is still dating Matthew. They kiss while rehearsing lines for their musical. When the Llanview High School prom approaches, Nate hopes to ask Dani, although Matthew's jealousy leads him to ask Dani as quickly as possible, leaving Nate out of luck. Nate asks Whitney Bennett to go to the prom., and although she gladly accepts, Nate is unable to get his mind off of Danielle.

After the prom, Nate realizes how strong his feelings for Danielle have become. Nate and Dani begin to sneak off together when they share their romantic feelings for each other. Dani breaks up with Matthew, and she and Nate become an official couple.

While swimming at the Llantano River, Nate and Dani spot a shiny object beneath some leaves. The object it turns out to be a briefcase filled with $50,000. Nate decided to keep the money, and gives his mother, Inez Salinger, enough so she can pay their bills which were due weeks ago. Nate tells Dani what he did, but Matthew overhears them talking. Matthew remembers that a man named Bull was searching for Starr and the $50,000. Matthew tells Bull that Nate stole his money. Bull kidnaps Nate and holds him hostage. Dani gets Todd to help for the ransom. It is then revealed that this really is about James Ford: James had hidden the money at the quarry where Dani and Nate found it. It ends when Bull is shot and killed by Todd. When James is accidentally shot by Starr, Todd and Nate quickly rush him to the hospital. Once James recovers, Nate visits him and apologizes for stealing the money. James accepts his apology.

Inez informs both Nate and James that she is not only Nate's mother, but the mother of James Ford and Robert Ford as well. Robert feels that Inez abandoned him and James with their deranged father, Eddie Ford. Inez also reveals that she was pregnant with Nate when she was still with Eddie, which means that Eddie is also Nate's father, thus making James and Robert his brothers. Nate tries to connect with his brothers, but Robert is adamantly against it.

When Eddie Ford is later found murdered, Nate becomes the immediate suspect. Nate discovers that Matthew actually killed Eddie, and when he confronts him, he punches Matthew and puts him in the hospital. Nate tells this to Deanna Forbes, an ex-girlfriend of James who had moved in with Nate and his mother, and is overheard by Rick Powers, a pornography producer. Rick blackmails Nate and Deanna into starring in one of his pornographic movies. After they film the movie, Rick promises to keep quiet about Nate's secret.

In July 2011, instead of showing Vickerman at the Palace Hotel premiere, Rick substitutes the pornographic film that Deanna and Nate did together. Everyone in the audience is shocked, and Dani slaps Nate across the face and storms out with her family. Nate shows up at her home, eager to explain, but Dani throws him out of the house. Dani later tells her mother that she and Nate have broken up. In October, Nate surprises Dani with a birthday present. Dani forgives him and agrees to go on a date. In December, Dani and Nate exchange Christmas presents, and they officially get back together.

== Cutter Wentworth ==
Cutter Wentworth
- One Life to Live character
- Portrayed by: Josh Kelly
- Duration: 2010–11, 2013
- First appearance: December 29, 2010
- Last appearance: August 19, 2013
- Created by: Ron Carlivati
- Introduced by: Frank Valentini; Jennifer Pepperman (2013)
In-universe information
- Occupation: Manager and Club Promoter at Shelter nightclub (2013); Dishwasher at the Bonjour Café in Paris, Texas (2011); Front Desk Clerk at the Minute Man Motel (2011); Con artist (pre-2011)
- Parents: William Wentworth, Jr.; Alex Olanov
- Sisters: Kimberly Andrews
- Spouse: Jessica Buchanan (2011 as Tess)
- Grandparents: William Wentworth; Nat Olanov

Cutter Wentworth was portrayed by Josh Kelly from December 29, 2010 to December 29, 2011. Kelly reprised the role when new daily episodes of OLTL began airing on Hulu via The Online Network from April 29, 2013 to August 19, 2013, until the show (along with All My Children) were both put on indefinite hiatus due to Prospect Park's lawsuit against ABC.

=== Casting ===
Kelly was originally cast in the long-time role of Joey Buchanan, a character that was returning to the show as a permanent contract role after six years. However, producers later decided that Kelly was a better fit for the newly created character Cutter, who, like Joey, would also serve as a love interest for both Terri Conn's Aubrey Wentworth and Gina Tognoni's Kelly Cramer. The role of Joey would be taken by Tom Degnan.

== Aubrey Wentworth ==
Aubrey Wentworth
- One Life to Live character
- Portrayed by: Terri Conn
- Duration: 2010–2011
- First appearance: November 29, 2010
- Last appearance: December 29, 2011
- Created by: Ron Carlivati
- Introduced by: Frank Valentini
In-universe information
- Other names: Kristine Karr
- Occupation: Bartender; Con artist
- Spouse: Joey Buchanan (2011)

Aubrey Wentworth is portrayed by Terri Conn from November 29, 2010, to December 29, 2011. After the cancellation of As the World Turns in 2010, Conn left her role as then Katie Peretti and joined the cast of One Life to Live as newly-created character Aubrey. Aubrey began her time in town as a smart and beautiful con artist but soon developed into a more caring person with a less criminal outlook on life.

=== Casting and characterization ===
Terri Conn was offered the new role of Aubrey Wentworth following the cancellation and series finale of the CBS daytime drama As the World Turns, less than two months earlier. After having spent 12 years as Katie Peretti from 1998 until 2010 and a guest starring role on CBS' The Young and the Restless in 1995, Conn remained a part of the genre after the show contacted her agent after releasing a casting call for the character. After screen testing with OLTL star Erika Slezak (Victoria Lord) and David Fumero (Cristian Vega), Conn was hired for the role. Conn's continued career was considered a relief to the actress because of the difficult job market as well as the new direction she would be taking by playing a more mature role.

Conn commented on the development of the character and the difference between her OLTL and ATWT roles in an interview with TV Guide columnist Michael Logan:

I love the name! It sounds so mature. I'm excited to play someone other than Katie, not that I didn't love her but I did play her for 12 years. It's time to spread my wings and try a different kind of character. Katie was so perky and I could never get away from that. Even toward the end they'd be going, 'Could you make her a little bit more...you know...Katie!' They never really let me grow up."

The casting coincided with the hirings of former World Turns co-star Tom Degnan (Joey Buchanan) and newcomer Josh Kelly (Cutter Wentworth). The arrivals would permit a love quadrangle between these three characters and Kelly Cramer, played by Gina Tognoni, who rejoined the show several months earlier after the cancellation of another long running CBS daytime drama, Guiding Light.

=== Storylines ===
Aubrey Wentworth comes to town on a plane coming from London to visit her boyfriend Joey Buchanan in Llanview. She meets Joey's ex-wife Kelly Cramer, and both women are unaware of the other's feelings for Joey. Aubrey arrives and meets Joey's parents Clint Buchanan and Victoria Lord and accepts Joey's surprising marriage proposal, where Kelly learns the two were a couple. As Kelly and Aubrey's rivalry grows, Aubrey's real boyfriend Cutter Wentworth arrives and it is apparent that the pair are planning on conning Joey of his fortune after she marries him. As Cutter poses as her brother, they succeed in keeping her secret from being revealed by Kelly and her aunt Dorian Lord. However, their deception comes out when she and Joey take care of Ryder Ford, the son of Jessica Buchanan while she is under the influence of her alternate personality "Tess." Aubrey wants to be honest with Joey because she finally recognizes her feelings for him and tells him about her and Cutter's real plans, but Joey breaks up with her and Jessica soon regains custody of her son. After Cutter discovers that Aubrey has actual feelings for Joey, he shocks Aubrey by eloping with Tess/Jessica and blackmailing Clint for a piece of his fortune and ownership of The Buchanan Mansion in exchange for committing their daughter to St. Anne's. Cutter later loses his piece of the Buchanan fortune and the mansion when he discovers that Clint had a loophole in the mansion's deed that he could take back ownership of the mansion anytime he wants to. Clint gives the mansion to his long-lost son Rex Balsom after he blackmails him for his entire fortune so that his recently "deceased" fiancée Gigi Morasco can donate her heart to Clint after he suffered a major heart attack. It later turns out that he got the heart of Gigi's sister Stacy Morasco when it was later revealed that Gigi was still alive.

After Joey and Kelly reunite and leave town following his divorce from Aubrey, she shortly reunites with Cutter after they begin a life without crime. However, she breaks up with him again after learning his attempt to con Clint's other son, Rex after the "death" of his fiancée Gigi, following the reveal that Aubrey's real name was Kristine Karr and the real Aubrey Wentworth was Cutter's own sister Kimberly Andrews. Kristine took on the name so that she and Cutter could con rich men out of money under the disguise of brother and sister. Aubrey eventually becomes a confidant for Rex and his son Shane Morasco as Cutter tries to con them out of their family's money with the fact that Gigi was still alive and it was her sister Stacy who died. Cutter is eventually arrested and Kim leaves town. After Rex and Shane reunite with Gigi, Aubrey realizes she no longer has a place in anyone's lives and leaves town.

== Others ==
Character	Date(s)	Actor	Storylines
Arturo Bandini	June 25 – August 19, 2013	Paolo Seganti	
Drew Buchanan II	January 13, 2012; May 8, 2013 – August 19, 2013	Mia-Bella Knight (2012); Elijah and Isaiah Ford (2013)	Drew is the son of Matthew Buchanan and Destiny Evans, born on January 13, 2012. He was named after Matthew's late brother, Drew Buchanan.
Deanna Forbes	March 23 – July 19, 2011	Nafessa Williams	Deanna is the ex-girlfriend of James Ford. She arrives and hopes to rekindle her relationship with James but he is happy with Starr. She moves in with James' brother, Nate Salinger, and the two bond. With no money, Deanna contemplates Rick Powers' offer to take part in pornographic films. Rick later blackmails her into doing the film for information on her mom and afterward, Deanna leaves for California to find her mother.
Kate Lane	June 25 – August 19, 2013	Alice Callahan	Kate seduces Jack Manning after a chance encounter at a coffee shop. Jack later discovers that she is his English teacher.
Sebastian "Baz" Moreau	June 20 – September 20, 2011	Barret Helms	Sebastian "Baz" Moreau is the son of Tomás Delgado and Yvette Moreau. Baz arrives in Llanview after his mother sent him to live with his father, Tomas, who was already in Llanview. He is a DJ and an aspiring musician and songwriter. Baz and Starr Manning forge a friendship and make music together. He later kisses Starr, who rejects his advances because she is in a relationship with James Ford. Baz enlists the help of former pornographer turned music producer Rick Powers to launch Starr's music career. He leaves town in September 2011 with Rick Powers to take a DJ gig in Paris, France.
Neela Patel	November 3, 2011 – January 12, 2012	Teresa Patel	Neela is the sister of Vimal Patel, and a friend of Jack Manning and Shane Morasco.
Vimal Patel	November 19, 2010 – January 2012; May 2 – June 6, 2013	Nick Choksi	Vimal is the husband of Rama Patel and brother of Neela Patel. He works as a laboratory technician.
Carl Peterson	August 12 – August 19, 2013	Ron Raines	
Erin	September 8, 2011	Erin Torpey	Erin is the new colleague of Cristian Vega whom he meets in Barcelona in his final episode. Erin, who is teaching English poetry, is impressed by Christian's knowledge of poetry and upon learning that he is the new art teacher, she says that they will be seeing a lot of each other. Christian tells her that she reminds him a lot of somebody that he used to know. This is due to the fact that Erin Torpey had previously played Christian's former love interest, Jessica Buchanan, before the character was recast.

== See also ==
- List of One Life to Live characters
