= David Vickers =

American fictional character

- One Life to Live character
- Portrayed by: Tuc Watkins
- Duration: 1994–1996; 2001–2013
- First appearance: May 6, 1994
- Last appearance: August 2013
- Created by: Michael Malone and Josh Griffith
- Introduced by: Linda Gottlieb (1994); Gary Tomlin (2001); Jennifer Pepperman (2013)
- Crossover appearances: All My Children
In-universe information
- Other names: David Bradley Truman (birth name); David Vickers (common name until 2009); David Vickeroshi; David Vickers Buchanan
- Occupation: Executive Editor for "Craze" magazine (2004–2006); Actor (2009–); Reporter for The Banner (2010–11); Con artist (pre-2010)
- Family: Buchanan
- Parents: Bo Buchanan; Emma Bradley
- Adoptive parents: Ned Truman
- Stepparents: Nora Hanen
- Half-brothers: Spencer Truman; Drew Buchanan; Matthew Buchanan
- Half-sisters: Rachel Gannon (step)
- Spouse: Tina Lord (1995); Dorian Cramer (1995–96, 2009, 2011–13); Alex Olanov (2007); Addie Cramer (2008)
- Stepchildren: Cassie Callison; Adriana Cramer; Langston Wilde
- Grandparents: Asa Buchanan; Olympia Buchanan
- Aunts and uncles: Clint Buchanan; Ben Davidson
- Nieces and nephews: Hugh Hughes; Drew Buchanan II; Blair Cramer(in-law); Kelly Cramer(in-law); Paul Cramer(in-law)
- First cousins: Cord Roberts; Kevin Buchanan (adoptive); Joey Buchanan (adoptive); Jessica Buchanan; Natalie Buchanan; Rex Balsom
- Other relatives: Starr Manning; Hope Manning

David Vickers is a fictional character from the American soap opera One Life to Live, portrayed by Tuc Watkins.

== Casting ==
The character David Vickers was first introduced in 1994 by Tuc Watkins, who played the character until 1996. He then briefly reprised the role in October 2001 and January 2002. Watkins returned from August 2003 through November 2006, and then for a five-month run starting March 6, 2007. He reappeared again near the end of May 2007 and left on July 26, 2007, only to return temporarily in November 2007.

Watkins returned for another short-term run from May 7 to August 6, 2008, and Soap Opera Digest subsequently named David their "Most Entertaining Male Character" of 2008, writing: "Time and time again, David's harebrained schemes and Tuc Watkins's side-splitting performances provide amusement we're always sorry to see end." Watkins returned again from December 26, 2008, though March 2, 2009, later reappearing on April 7, 2009, and on April 22, April 23, and April 27, 2009. Watkins returned on August 10, 2009, February 2010, April 2010, and June 2010. Watkins reprised the role continually from late 2010 through the original television finale episode aired on January 12, 2012, and reprised the role when new daily episodes of OLTL debuted on Hulu, iTunes, and FX Canada via The Online Network on April 29, 2013. Watkins also appeared on All My Children for several episodes in 2005.

== Storylines ==
In 2007, David spends time in prison for a crime he did not commit. Asa Buchanan agreed to pay him $10 million to murder Spencer Truman. When Truman is murdered by Lindsay Rappaport, David pleads guilty in order to receive the payoff. While David is in prison, Jessica Buchanan is in need of a liver transplant. Dorian visits David and asks him to get tested to see if he is a match. He is not interested in helping Jessica, but takes the test anyway.

David is angry when Detective John McBain fights to get him out of jail because he will not receive payment from Asa. McBain feels certain that David did not commit murder. David is released but has no money and no home. It seems no one in Llanview will let him move in with him. Viki Davidson, however, agrees to let him move into Llanfair when she sees how jealous and angry it makes Dorian. Viki and David pretend to be lovers to further annoy Dorian. In the process, they become good friends.

Jessica's body rejects a transplant from her husband, Antonio Vega. It is revealed that David is a match. David does not want to donate part of his liver but is willing to do it for a fee. He tells Clint Buchanan that he will agree to the surgery for $10 million. Clint takes the deal and states that he will not tell Viki about the bribe.

Viki is grateful to David for saving her daughter. She brings David a new computer as a thank-you gift while visiting him in the hospital. When she finds out that he was paid for the deed, she is angry and storms out of the room. David is sad to lose his best friend and soon signs the money back over to Clint. Viki forgives him.

In November 2007, David is stalked at Dreamland, a pricey rehab facility on an unnamed tropical island, by Alex Olanov. At the funeral of Asa Buchanan in August, Olanov overhears Nigel tell Max Holden that David is Asa's biological son. Olanov also learns that David is at the resort not as a client/patient, but is working there as a towel boy/waiter. Alex pretends to be there to treat her addiction to sex (aggravated when her wealthy ex-husband dies) but cons the broke Vickers into marrying him to help her "cure" her addiction. Smelling a fun ride through the money Alex received from her dead ex-husband, David quickly agrees to marry Alex. Olanov gets David to sign a prenup, which gives him half of her earnings and her half of his earnings in a divorce. Thinking he's completely broke, David eagerly signs the document. Olanov and Vickers then fly to Texas, where Clint Buchanan, Nora Buchanan, Renee Divine Buchanan, Jessica Buchanan, Nash Brennan, Natalie Buchanan, Jared Banks, Nigel Bartholomew-Smythe, and Matthew Buchanan have all gone for the reading of Asa's will. David is at this point still in the dark about his new family and inheritance. David and Alex run into Dorian at the airport on their way to Texas. At the ranch—when Dorian misinterprets a kiss between Clint and Nora—she and David wind up having sex (which Clint discovers the next morning). After Alex discovers that Asa left Vickers no money in the will, she dumps David.

On May 7, 2008, David works as a dishwasher in Paris, Texas. Escaping the watchful eyes of Llanview, Jared and Natalie Buchanan — who now knows Jared is not her uncle, and is having an affair with him — arrive at the Bon Jour. Overhearing their secret, David follows them back to Llanview and blackmails them. As they would rather reveal their scam to the family than pay David, Dorian reveals the secret to aid her in taking over Buchanan Enterprises. Clint and his brother Bo Buchanan reluctantly agree to her terms on June 18, 2008, and are shocked (and suspicious) at the news that David is their brother. Meanwhile, David marries Dorian's sister Addie Cramer for financial safety but reluctantly divorces her in exchange for Dorian saving Viki's life after a car crash. He tries to continue his relationship with Addie as leverage to force Dorian into relinquishing the renamed Cramer Enterprises back to Clint. However, Addie dumps David, as both marriage and divorce were part of an eccentric "to do list" that Addie had created after being released from St. Ann's sanitarium.

David reappears on December 26, 2008, calling himself "David Vickeroshi" and having "found peace" and renounced all worldly possessions as a Buddhist monk. Meanwhile, a portion of Asa's will is removed, and the entire estate is left to David — if Asa's lawyer can find him. Dorian learns of David's paternity and pending inheritance, and plots to marry him or gain his power-of-attorney before he learns the truth himself. They marry on February 9, 2009. With David's paternity revealed publicly, Dorian manages to convince David to shed his Buddhist ways and take his inheritance; the couple soon throw the rest of the Buchanans out of Asa's mansion out of spite for withholding the secret. However, on February 25, 2009, a new paternity test determines that David is Bo's son, as Bo had slept with Emma once in 1968 (indirectly caused by Rex Balsom, who represented Bo when he was trapped in the past). After talking to Viki about what would truly make him happy, David decides to pursue his dream of an acting career in Los Angeles. Dorian chooses to stay in Llanview to seek her revenge against Clint, and David leaves town on March 2, 2009.

David returned to Llanview in August 2009 after his acting career fails. His teenage half-brother Matthew Buchanan, crippled in an accident, is suing his parents Nora Hanen and Bo for the right to proceed with a dangerous surgery that can cure him. David is revealed to be the one paying for Matthew's legal fees and later helps Matthew escape from the British boarding school where Bo and Nora have sent him to thwart the legal decision against them. David bonds with Bo but remains in London, later helping Kelly Cramer in February 2010. To protect the family, David returns to Llanview once again on April 2, 2010, and blackmails Clint Buchanan's new wife Kimberly Andrews into leaving Llanview. He reappears on June 3, 2010, for Bo and Nora's remarriage. He begins hanging around Viki again much to the chagrin of her husband, Charlie Banks. Meanwhile, Viki offers him a fashion job at The Banner because Charlie and Dorian are working very closely together on another project. Charlie and Viki come up with a plan to help David and Dorian realize they still love each other.

On August 17, 2010, Dorian and David admit their love for one another and have sex. David "proposes" and Dorian accepts. On August 18, Dorian and David and Eli and Blair plan on having a double wedding, but that plan is thwarted by Clint, who kidnaps David and, by letter, makes Dorian believe that David had left her again.

David is eventually rescued from his prison cell and is soon reunited with his father and Rex Balsom, who is now his cousin. Upon his return he and Dorian reunite after he saves her from the clutches of Cutter Wentworth, a gold-digging con-artist who was trying to seduce Dorian for her money. Dorian and David then remarry for the third time. He also is cast in a film based on his life and has Dorian's daughter Langston Wilde write the script for it, while her ex-boyfriend, Markko Rivera, is set to direct it, leading to the pair's romantic reconciliation. David returned from Hollywood, California, in June 2011 with Dorian, only to be arguing with each other when Dorian accuses David of having an affair with his co-star Ionia Masters, who plays his onscreen version of his wife Dorian in the big screen biopic Vicker Man. David and Dorian are both unaware that Echo DiSavoy is paying Ionia to seduce David away from Dorian to avenge her for helping Viki to ruin her affair with Viki's ex-husband Charlie Banks, although David is suspicious that someone is setting him up to ruin his marriage. David accuses Clint at first, but Dorian reminds him that Clint's health problems at the time are preventing him from performing these types of machinations towards them. When David later has a conversation with Viki, talking to her about all the people he is known in his life who would hold a grudge against him, Viki eventually figures out that Echo was the person who was sabotaging his marriage to Dorian. David and Viki later go to Dorian's La Boulaie estate to tell Dorian the truth, but they both discover that Dorian has vanished from her home. Viki tries to calm David down after his wife's disappearance. Dorian eventually reunites with David at the police station after she was kidnapped by Echo and held hostage at the Minute Man Motel. She was rescued by her seven-year-old grandnephew Sam Manning while he was wearing a Spider-Man mask. David and Dorian go back home to the La Boulaie estate, where they have sex. David and Dorian later attend the premiere of their film Vicker Man at the Palace Hotel, where Dorian gets into a confrontation with Ionia because they are wearing identical dresses. David helps break up the fight between them when David has the film's director Markko send Ionia home in a cab. David and Dorian's film premiere is unfortunately upstaged by porn producer Rick Powers, when he switches the Vicker Man film with his porno film Hold The Diploma, which stars local Llanview teenagers Nate Salinger and Deanna Forbes. David and Dorian both later learn that Rick put the Vicker Man film on the internet.

In August 2011, David's agent offers him a role in a big blockbuster film project that is going to be filmed in Stockholm, Sweden; David gladly accepts. David tells Dorian about the role and wants Dorian to move with him to Sweden. Dorian tells David that she cannot go because she got a call to become a senator in Washington, D.C., because the previous senator was involved in a sexting scandal. David wants to put his acting career on hold to be with Dorian in Washington, D.C. while she is senator. Dorian says that David cannot do that because he would get bored cheat on her. David and Dorian mutually agree to balance their marriage with their own busy careers. David goes to Sweden to film his film for three months and comes back to Washington, D.C., on Election Night to be there to support Dorian to win the senatorial election. David says good-bye to his family and Dorian before he leaves to go do his film in Sweden. He also says good-bye to his best friend, Viki, after seeing her and Dorian trapped in her mayoral office.

David returned to Llanview one last time on January 12, 2012, to visit Bo, Nora, and Matthew. He tells them that his latest Swedish film, The Boy with The Chipmunk Tattoo, bombed at the box office. He convinces Matthew to be there for the birth of his child with Destiny before he goes back to Washington, D.C., to tell Dorian the bad news about his second unsuccessful film.
