= Joey Buchanan =

- One Life to Live character
- Tom Degnan as Joey Buchanan
- Portrayed by: Ryan Morris (1980–1985); John Paul Learn (1985–1990); Chris McKenna (1990–1993); Nathan Fillion (1994–1997, 2007); Don Jeffcoat (1997–2001); Bruce Michael Hall (2003–2004); Tom Degnan (2010–2011)
- Duration: 1980–2001; 2003–2004; 2007; 2010–2011
- First appearance: January 8, 1980
- Last appearance: August 24, 2011
- Created by: Gordon Russell; Sam Hall
- Introduced by: Joseph Stuart (1980); Frank Valentini (2003)
- Bruce Michael Hall as Joey Buchanan

- Nathan Fillion as Joey Buchanan
In-universe information
- Other names: Joseph Francis Riley Jr. (birth name); Joseph Francis Riley Buchanan
- Occupation: Photographer; Businessman; Clergyman
- Family: Lord; Riley; Buchanan (adoptive)
- Father: Joe Riley
- Mother: Victoria Lord
- Adoptive father: Clint Buchanan
- Brothers: Kevin Buchanan
- Half-brothers: Cord Roberts (adoptive); Rex Balsom (adoptive)
- Half-sisters: Megan Gordon; Megan Craig Riley; Natalie Buchanan; Jessica Buchanan
- Spouse: Kelly Cramer (2000–2001); Jennifer Rappaport (2003–2004); Aubrey Wentworth (2011)
- Grandfathers: Victor Lord; Asa Buchanan (adoptive)
- Grandmothers: Eugenia Randolph Lord; Olympia Buchanan (adoptive)
- Aunts and uncles: Eileen Riley Siegel; Tom Dennison; Tony Lord; Meredith Lord; Tina Lord; Todd Manning; Victor Lord Jr.; Bo Buchanan (adoptive); Ben Davidson (adoptive)
- Nieces and nephews: Duke Buchanan; Shane Balsom; Bree Brennan; Liam McBain; Ryder Ford
- First cousins: Julie Siegel; Tim Siegel; Mari Lynn Dennison; Brian Kendall; Daniel Wolek; C. J. Roberts; Sarah Roberts; Starr Manning; Danielle Manning; Jack Manning; Sam Manning; David Vickers Buchanan (adoptive); Drew Buchanan (adoptive); Matthew Buchanan (adoptive)

Joey Buchanan (born Joe Riley Jr.) is a fictional character from the American daytime serial One Life to Live. The character is the son of original protagonists Victoria Lord and Joe Riley Sr.

== Casting ==
The role of Joey Buchanan was originated by child actor Ryan Morris from 1980 to 1985. Morris was then replaced by John Paul Learn from 1985 to June 20, 1990. On September 18, 1990, the role was reintroduced by teen actor Chris McKenna, who portrayed the role until 1993. In 1994, actor Nathan Fillion first appeared in the regular role of an 18-year-old Joey on the episode first-run April 28, 1994. Fillion remained on the series until his on-screen departure on February 14, 1997. Fillion's portrayal of Joey earned him a Younger Actor Emmy nomination in 1998. Following Fillion's departure, the role was recast with actor Don Jeffcoat, who stepped into the role on-screen on October 17, 1997.

In 2000, it was announced that Jeffcoat was cast out of the series after his contract was not extended. Jeffcoat last aired on-air on January 19, 2001. In early 2003, it was announced that Passions actor Bruce Michael Hall would join the cast as the third adult actor to portray the role of Joey. However, it was announced in November 2003 that Hall had been let go from the show. He last aired in 2004. Fillion returned briefly to the role in August 2007 for One Life to Live's 9,999 and 10,000 episodes.

In July 2009, it was reported that actor Daniel Cosgrove, best known for his role as Bill Lewis on the CBS Daytime soap opera Guiding Light would be cast in the role as Joey Buchanan following the series' September 2009 finale. The reports were confirmed untrue when it was announced that Cosgrove would join the CBS Daytime soap As the World Turns in the role of Christopher Hughes.

In the summer of 2010, a casting call went out with the prospect of possibly officially recasting the role of Joey Buchanan. On October 5, 2010, it was announced that newcomer Josh Kelly had been cast as Joey Buchanan. Kelly had a projected on-air debut of November 24, 2010. Kelly reportedly beat out several Daytime heavy-weights including Matt Borlenghi, Brody Hutzler, and Austin Peck. However, two days later, it was announced that the role of Joey had been unrecast and then re-recast the role with former As the World Turns actor Tom Degnan, and that Kelly would be cast in another contract role of new character Cutter Wentworth instead. One Life to Live executive producer Frank Valentini released a statement concerning the change-up, stating:

After auditioning a talented group of guys for the role of Joey, we are excited to announce that not one but two of them will be joining the cast of One Life to Live in contract roles. [W]e have decided that Josh Kelly is a great fit for the other contract role that we have written [...] We look forward to both actors joining the show.

Degnan premiered as previously reported for Kelly on November 24, 2010. Following the April 2011 cancellation of One Life to Live and All My Children, it was announced that Degnan would exit alongside co-star Gina Tognoni, who was portraying Joey's long-time love, Kelly Cramer would exit the series before its January 2012 finale. Both Degnan and Tognoni exited the soap on August 24, 2011.

== Storylines ==
=== 1980–1993 ===
Joey is born to Victoria "Viki" Lord Riley (Erika Slezak) mere months after the death of his father and her husband Joe Riley (Lee Patterson) in 1980. When Viki later marries Clint Buchanan (Clint Ritchie) in 1982, Clint adopts Joey and his older brother, Kevin Lord Riley. In the summer of 1992, a teenage Joey befriends a closeted gay teen named Billy Douglas (Ryan Phillippe) who had a friendship with the Rev. Andrew Carpenter (Wortham Krimmer). College student Marty Saybrooke (Susan Haskell), who has a crush on Andrew and is jealous of his relationship with Billy, accuses Andrew of molesting Billy. Andrew is later found not to be sexually abusing Billy, which forces Billy to come out of the closet to his parents and to the citizens of Llanview. Joey supports his friend Billy as he copes with coming out of the closet and the homophobia from the town and his disapproving father. Andrew later helps bring the AIDS quilt to Llanview to help the town to tolerate the gay community.

=== 1994–2007 ===
Joey (Nathan Fillion) and Dorian (Robin Strasser), 1994

In 1994, a young adult Joey secretly romances his former step-grandmother, Vicki's nemesis Dr. Dorian Lord (Robin Strasser). Though initially motivated by revenge against Viki, Dorian comes to love Joey; Viki is outraged when she finds out. During a recurrence of her dissociative identity disorder, one of Viki's alternate personalities, Jean Randolph, holds Dorian hostage in a secret room beneath Llanfair in 1995. One of the conditions of her release is to end the relationship with Joey, which she does.

Joey later becomes involved with Dorian's niece, Kelly Cramer (Gina Tognoni) in late 1995. Ultimately, Kelly leaves him for his brother Kevin.

In 2003, Joey returns to Llanview, having become a pastor in his absence. He soon marries Jennifer Rappaport, but her struggle to fit into her new role as a pastor's wife and her feelings for Rex Balsom destroy the marriage. Joey leaves town for London in January 2004. For two weeks that May, Joey returns while Viki undergoes heart transplant surgery.

Joey returns for two days in August 2007, along with brothers Cord Roberts (John Loprieno) and Kevin, for the funeral of his adopted grandfather, Asa Buchanan (Philip Carey). He and Dorian briefly discuss their past relationship, and the fact that they both still think of each other.

=== 2010–2011 ===
Joey returns to Llanview for Thanksgiving in 2010, with a woman named Aubrey Wentworth (Terri Conn). Though Kelly finds herself still in love with him, Joey proposes to Aubrey. Clint does a background check on Aubrey, which uncovers her history as a con artist with her professed brother but actual former boyfriend Cutter Wentworth (Josh Kelly). Aubrey learns of Clint's disreputable deeds and blackmails him. Despite Kelly's protests, Joey and Aubrey elope in February 2011. While Kelly insists to Joey that Aubrey's motive for marriage is his families' fortune, her accusations cause Joey to push her away. A devastated Kelly begins a romantic relationship with John McBain (Michael Easton), resigning herself to accept Joey's marriage to another woman. Eventually, Joey discovers that Aubrey's history and true relationship to Cutter. When Joey confronts Aubrey, she admits to her initial transgressions but vows she has fallen in love with Joey. Joey keeps his knowledge of Aubrey's actions quiet as the couple is awarded temporary custody of Joey's nephew, Ryder Ford, while Joey's sister and mother suffered bouts with multiple personalities. Later, Kelly is stabbed by the psychotic psychiatrist Dr. Marty Saybrooke (Susan Haskell) and left for dead, and Joey finally admits to and declares his undying affection for Kelly, while she lays in hospital. Joey and Aubrey soon divorce, in July 2011.

In August 2011, Joey announces that he is moving back to London with Kelly so they can be closer to Kelly's son and Joey's great-nephew, Zane. Before leaving Llanfair, Aubrey gives Joey back the engagement ring he gave her, but Joey declines to accept it and wishes Aubrey well. Joey lets Aubrey keep the ring because he gave it to her in "good faith", despite the fact that she originally married him for his money. Joey and Kelly say goodbye to family members before departing on the episode first-run August 24, 2011.
