= Kelly Cramer =

- One Life to Live character
- Gina Tognoni as Kelly Cramer
- Portrayed by: Gina Tognoni (1995–2002, 2010–2011); Tracy Melchior (2003); Heather Tom (2003–2006)
- Duration: 1995–2006; 2010–2011
- First appearance: February 20, 1995
- Last appearance: August 24, 2011
- Created by: Michael Malone and Josh Griffith
- Introduced by: Susan Bedsow Horgan (1995); Gary Tomlin (2001–2002); Frank Valentini (2003, 2010)
- Crossover appearances: All My Children
- Tracy Melchior as Kelly Cramer
In-universe information
- Other names: Kelly Cramer Buchanan; Heather Hines
- Occupation: Model; Journalist
- Family: Cramer
- Mother: Melinda Cramer
- Brothers: Paul Cramer
- Spouse: Joey Buchanan (2000–2001); Kevin Buchanan (2001–2004)
- Sons: Kevin Buchanan, Jr. (stillborn); Zane Buchanan
- Grandparents: Lou Cramer; Sonya Roskova
- Aunts: Dorian Cramer Lord; Addie Cramer
- First cousins: Blair Cramer; Cassie Callison; Adriana Cramer; Langston Wilde (adoptive)

Kelly Cramer is a fictional character on the long-running ABC soap opera One Life to Live. The role was originated by actress Gina Tognoni, who debuted on February 20, 1995, and played the character in her last appearance on August 24, 2011.

== Background and casting ==
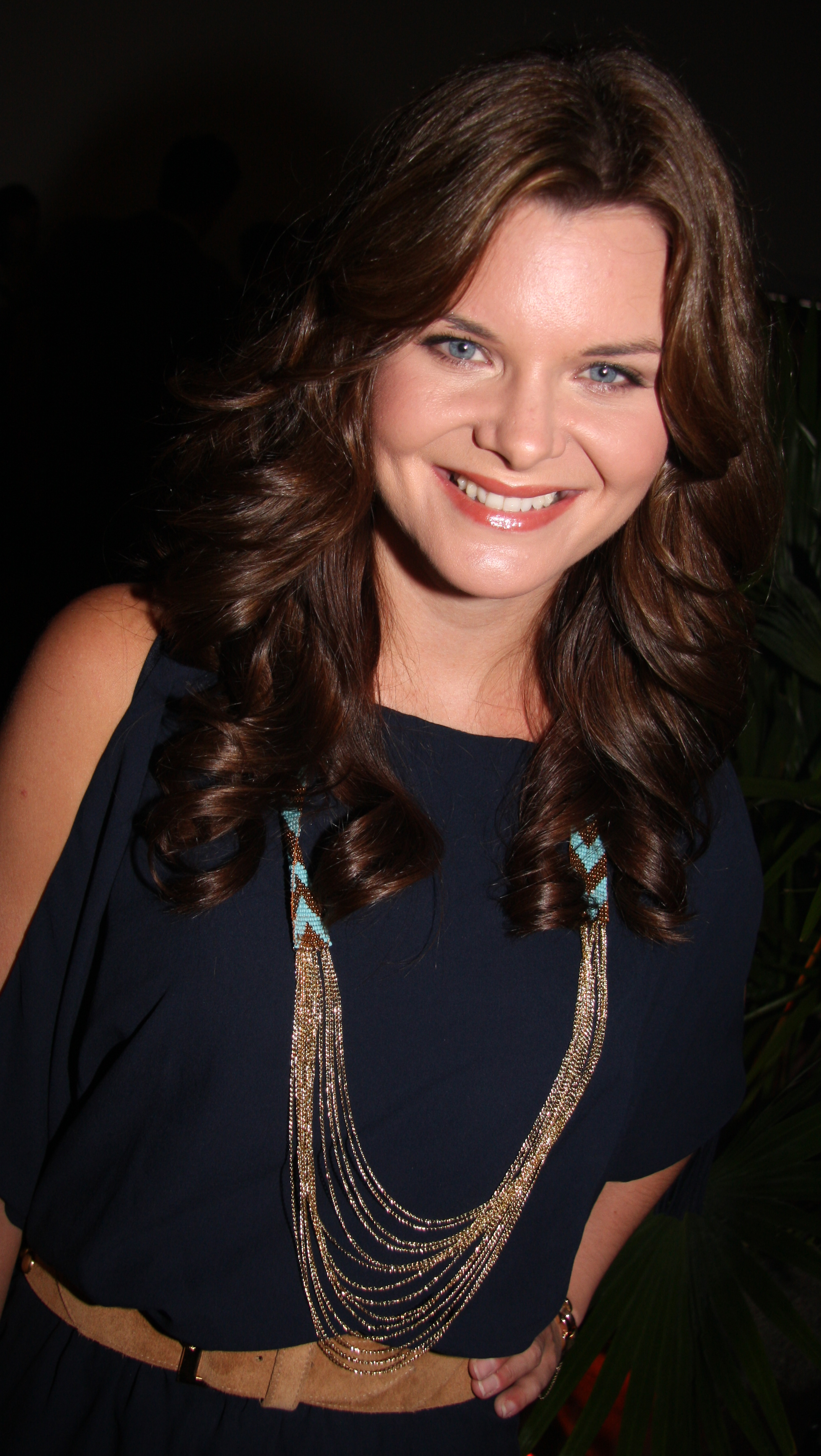
Heather Tom was cast in the role of Kelly in October 2003; she remained in the role until the character's exit in 2006.

The role of Kelly Cramer was originally offered to Alexandra Wilson in late 1994. When she turned the role down, the role was offered to actress Gina Tognoni, who originated in the role on the episode first run on February 20, 1995. In April 2001, it was announced that Tognoni had decided not to renew her contract after six years with the soap. Following Tognoni's announcement, it was rumored that the actress would take over the role of Carly Corinthos on the ABC Daytime soap General Hospital, a role that later went to actress Tamara Braun. Tognoni vacated the role on-screen on August 14, 2001. She briefly reprised her role from December 6 to 11, 2001 and from January 16 to 21, 2002.

In June 2003, it was announced that the role of Kelly Cramer was to be brought back to the series, this time with former CBS Daytime actress Tracy Melchior, best known for her role as Kristen Forrester on The Bold and the Beautiful. Melchoir debuted in the role on July 28, 2003. In October 2003, it was announced that former The Young and the Restless actress Heather Tom would replace Melchior as Kelly. Melchior last aired on December 10, 2003, with Tom debuting a day later on December 11, 2003. During Tom's run, the actress and her One Life alter-ego crossed over to the All My Children several times starting from March 22, 2004 until February 21, 2005 during a "baby switch" storyline involving both series. In 2005 and 2007, Tom was nominated for Supporting Actress Emmys in the role, the latter for an episode where Kelly confesses to romantically bonding with the son of impotent husband Kevin Buchanan who was portrayed by Dan Gauthier; in 2007, Tom lost her award bid to original Kelly Cramer actress, Gina Tognoni, who had been nominated for her role at the time, Dinah Marler on Guiding Light, which she had begun portraying in 2004.

In August 2006, it was announced that Tom had decided to exit from her contract to return to Los Angeles to pursue other acting opportunities. She issued a statement about her leave, saying:

It is with great regret that I have decided to leave the cast of OLTL [...] The time has come for me to return to Los Angeles and pursue other creative avenues. I have loved my time in New York City, and I have been so lucky to have known and worked with some of the best people in daytime. The love and support from everyone on the set of One Life and from all my fans has meant more to me than anyone can imagine.

Tom vacated the role on-screen on December 14, 2006. In April 2009, CBS cancelled Guiding Light; the cancellation lead to an influx of rumors that Tognoni would reprise her beloved One Life role. In June, it was reported that Tognoni was in talks with several soaps, including The Young and the Restless and The Bold and the Beautiful as her post-Guiding Light gig. It was further reported that One Life had passed on signing Tognoni back to the soap.

In September 2009, it was confirmed that Tognoni would reprise her role of Kelly Cramer after eight years. She returned on-screen on February 12, 2010.

Following the April 2011 cancellation of One Life to Live and All My Children, it was announced that Tognoni would exit alongside co-star Tom Degnan, who was portraying Joey Buchanan at the time, and who would exit the series before its January 2012 finale. Tognoni released a statement concerning the cancellation of the soap, saying:

It makes my heart sad and I am at a loss for the words to describe how I feel when I think about the cancellation of ONE LIFE and ALL MY CHILDREN [...] Over this past year I have met so many faces at events and countless loving and honest comments on Facebook and Twitter. I know without a doubt that these shows were special to you all. They entertained you, they got your minds off of whatever may be worrying you that day and got you laughing or crying instead — all in the same hour. I will miss working with a team of actors, directors, producers, cameras, makeup, wardrobe, hair, lighting, sound and every great effort that was made to keep this show going. This is a change in television culture; I believe that is why this is all so significant. I will miss the process and the fans. I LOVE YOU and loved doing it for you, with all my heart.

Tognoni last aired as Kelly Cramer on August 24, 2011. One Life to Live aired its final episode on ABC on January 13, 2012.

== Storylines ==
=== 1995–2002 ===
Kelly appears on the doorstep of her aunt, Dorian Lord, in February 1995. The daughter of Dorian's younger sister Melinda, Kelly has been expelled from her Parisian boarding school. She soon befriends Jessica Buchanan, the daughter of Dorian's nemesis Victoria Lord, and later falls in love with Jessica's brother (and Dorian's former lover) Joey.

Devastated over her breakup with Joey, Kelly gets into a car accident in the rain. The passenger in the other car is Kelly's cousin Blair Cramer, who loses her unborn baby (later named Brendan Thornhart). Wracked with guilt, Kelly hides her involvement; the secret is soon revealed, and she and Blair are estranged for a long time.

Kelly dates wealthy Ian Armitage and inherits his fortune when he dies in a plane crash in 1998. She then becomes romantically involved with Joey and Jessica's cousin Drew Buchanan, who is also later killed in October 1998. In early 1999, Kelly has an affair with Max Holden; she later leaves him at the altar when she realizes she is still in love with Joey. Kelly's boarding school friend Grace Monroe comes to town in 1999 and becomes engaged to Joey's brother Kevin Buchanan, but is tragically drowned the same year. Kelly and Kevin console each other as she and Joey become engaged in December 1999. That New Year's Eve, Kelly and Kevin have a few drinks and kiss. They stop themselves from making love and decide not to hurt Joey by telling him about it. Joey learns of his mother's breast cancer, and he and Kelly elope on April 14, 2000. Kelly struggles with her feelings for Kevin as she tries to make her marriage work. She ultimately confesses all to Joey, and they divorce in January 2001. Joey moves to London, and Kelly begins a relationship with Kevin. When Kevin moves to Texas to be closer to his young son Duke in March 2001, Kelly follows him in August.

Kelly returns for Blair's wedding to Todd Manning in December 2001, and again briefly in January 2002.

=== 2003–2006 ===
In July 2003, Kelly returned to Llanview on the heels of Kevin, now her husband. Their marriage strained, it is soon revealed that Kevin's new political career had pushed a lonely Kelly into an affair with a man named Nick Carson in Texas. Desperate to save the marriage, Kelly tries to get pregnant even though it may put her life in danger. Kevin asks for a divorce but changes his mind when Kelly becomes pregnant. While out of town in 2004, Kelly lost the baby and was sent onto the verge of a breakdown.

Meanwhile, Kelly's half-brother Paul Cramer finds himself delivering the babies of both his ex-wife Babe Carey and her friend Bianca Montgomery during a rainstorm in nearby Pine Valley on March 24, 2004. Paul stages a crash with his MEDEVAC helicopter and takes Babe's son for Kelly, who is desperate for a child to save her marriage and has not yet told Kevin about the miscarriage. Paul initially tells Babe that the child had died in the accident; threatened at the scene by the powerful family of the child's father, Paul quickly changes his plan, giving Bianca's daughter to Babe and telling Bianca that her baby had died instead. Unaware of the child's origins, Kelly brings Babe's infant back to Llanview, passing him off as her child with Kevin. Kevin and Kelly name the baby Asa "Ace" Buchanan II after Kevin's grandfather. Their marriage crumbles anyway in 2005, and Kevin secures custody. Meanwhile, a devastated Kelly discovers that Paul had stolen Ace from his mother; Paul, desperate for cash, blackmails Kelly by threatening to reveal the secret to Kevin and Llanview. Armed with the truth, Kelly realizes they must return the child to his parents; though broken-hearted, they do.

Kevin and Kelly begin dating again but soon break up; she briefly dates Dr. Spencer Truman and then reconciles with Kevin. After Spencer performs a new surgical procedure on Kelly that could potentially reverse her infertility, Kevin proposes. Spencer, however, enacting his vendetta against the Buchanans, exposes Kevin to a virus that renders him sterile. Kevin falls into a depression that strains his relationship with Kelly. Kevin's son Duke, now an adult, consoles Kelly and soon falls in love with her; they sleep together once before a tornado hits Llanview. Kelly and Duke are both seriously injured; with only one surgeon available, Kevin is forced to choose whether his ex-wife or son will go into surgery first. He chooses Kelly, and is devastated as Duke dies in his arms.

In the wake of Duke's death, Kelly discovers that she is pregnant with his child; Kevin swears he will never forgive her, and Kelly decides to leave Llanview. Kevin has a change of heart, and convinces her to stay; he is at her side when she gives birth prematurely to a son, and they name the baby Zane. Reconciled and resigned to start over as a family, Kevin and Kelly relocate to London with Zane.

=== 2010–2011 ===
In February 2010, Kelly returns to Llanview and receives devastating news that her mother Melinda has died of a heart attack. Dorian believes that Mitch Laurence, who has threatened the Cramer women, is behind Melinda's death. Kevin proposes to Kelly on the day of her mother's funeral, but she declines. Todd tries to convince Kelly to stay in Llanview and work for him at The Sun, in part to annoy Blair; Kelly at first refuses, but is intrigued by the challenge and is soon goaded by Todd into signing a contract. Kelly subsequently receives calls from a mysterious person informing her that her mother was indeed murdered. She first enlists Todd and Detective John McBain to assist her in the investigation, and later asks private investigator Rex Balsom to help find Bennett Thompson, a man she believes murdered Melinda.

Bennett is revealed to be Blair's boyfriend Elijah Clarke, and he is later killed. A lonely Kelly kisses Rex, but realizes that she is still in love with Joey. Kelly befriends a woman named Aubrey Wentworth as Joey returns to Llanview, but Kelly is soon shocked to discover that Joey and Aubrey are romantically involved. Joey's father Clint Buchanan soon discovers that Aubrey is a con artist, but Aubrey's lover and conspirator Cutter manages to destroy the evidence while Aubrey blackmails Clint into staying silent. Despite Kelly's protests, Joey marries Aubrey suddenly. A devastated Kelly falls into bed with John McBain, who is newly separated from Joey's sister Natalie. Kelly's relationship with John gains her an enemy in Marty Saybrooke, who has become mentally imbalanced and infatuated with John. On May 11, 2011, while waiting for John, Kelly is stabbed twice in the abdomen by a deranged Marty, who leaves her for dead on the bathroom floor. She is soon found by John and rushed to the hospital where the doctors reveal that she may have suffered either a liver or kidney laceration, but Kelly later recovers from her injuries, and eventually checks herself out of the hospital. Joey later finds out that Kelly was right all along about Aubrey and tells her he wants a second chance because he loves her and will divorce Aubrey. On July 21, 2011, Joey and Aubrey are officially divorced from each other, allowing both Joey and Kelly to reignite their romantic relationship with each other again. In August 2011, Kelly announces she is leaving Llanview to go back to London to be closer to her son Zane. Joey offers to go with her back to London, and she accepts his proposal. Kelly then says good-bye to her ex-boyfriend John, and encourages him to get back together with his former fiancé Natalie. Kelly then learns that her aunt Dorian is also leaving town to go run for senator in Washington D.C. after the previous senator is caught in a sex scandal. Kelly joins her family to throw a good-bye party for Dorian before she leaves town. Kelly then leaves with Joey to go back to London to be with her son Zane.

== See also ==
- Cramer family
