= Oliver Fish =

Fictional character from the "One Life to Live" TV series

- One Life to Live character
- Portrayed by: Scott Evans
- Duration: 2008–10
- First appearance: January 15, 2008
- Last appearance: April 12, 2010
- Created by: Ron Carlivati
- Introduced by: Frank Valentini
In-universe information
- Other names: Fish
- Occupation: Llanview police officer
- Parents: George Fish; Barbara Fish
- Daughters: Sierra Morasco

Oliver Fish (often referred to onscreen as Fish) is a fictional character on the ABC daytime drama One Life to Live. He was portrayed by Scott Evans from January 15, 2008, through April 12, 2010. The June 2009 announcement that the character would be romantically linked to another man in an ongoing story line came to wider attention when Patricia Mauceri (Carlotta Vega) was replaced after reportedly voicing personal religious objections to her character's involvement in the plot.

In the summer of 2009, Oliver is paired with Kyle Lewis, an old friend from college. The pair had been romantically involved, but Oliver broke off the relationship for fear of upsetting his conservative family. Oliver comes out to his parents in September, and starts dating Kyle in November. The couple were written out of the show in April 2010, with ABC explaining that the storyline "did not have the appeal we hoped it would."

== Impact and controversy ==
Initially brought in as Oliver for five episodes in January 2008, Evans returned more than 30 times over the next year-and-a-half, saying in a June 2009 interview with AfterElton.com that his appearances had been "building up" since the beginning of 2009. Oliver played a supporting role in several storylines, and was briefly linked romantically to two female regular characters, Layla Williamson (Tika Sumpter) and Stacy Morasco (Crystal Hunt).

On June 15, 2009, the openly gay Evans confirmed rumors that Oliver would be going through a "coming out story" and hinted at the character's possible past and future romantic entanglements with another man, Kyle Lewis (Brett Claywell). "I think right now it's going to be a story of his journey and how he's dealing with all this stuff ... he's doing everything in his power to kind of put this [being gay] on the backburner and not let it be a part of his life, but with Kyle in the picture, it's just coming to the forefront." TV Guide later quoted Sue Johnson, vice president of daytime programming at ABC, saying:

In telling the love story of Fish and Kyle, Kyle has to get over the fact that Fish is pretending he’s not gay, and that’s something really new and interesting to explore — a journey we haven’t tackled before." Johnson noted, "Soaps have a history of exploring social issues, and there’s been a lot of progress where gay issues are concerned. When we wanted Bianca to kiss Lena on [All My Children], we had to jump through hoops to make it happen. It seems people are more accepting of gays now. Yet, at the same time, you look at what’s happened with Proposition 8 and you go, whoa, we haven’t come as far as we’d like to think we’ve come ... We’re getting a lot of press for our gay storyline and we like that, but it’s nice to think we’ll soon see the day when this is no longer a big deal.

Meanwhile, on the heels of the announcement of the pending gay storyline in June 2009, Mauceri was replaced as long-running character Carlotta Vega. According to Michael Logan of TV Guide, based on her religious beliefs Mauceri had taken issue with upcoming scenes that would have Carlotta finding a book called How To Tell Your Parents That You're Gay. Though the book belongs to Oliver, Carlotta believes it is her son's, and is subsequently "understanding and supportive of her son's sexuality." When Mauceri reportedly went to the show's executive producer Frank Valentini and "told him she wouldn't perform it as written and that she had reworked a significant amount of the dialogue," Logan noted that "Valentini refused to accept Mauceri's changes and quickly replaced her with actress Saundra Santiago."

== Characterization and portrayal ==
Oliver Fish and Kyle Lewis (Scott Evans and Brett Claywell).

Asked immediately prior to the Oliver-Kyle storyline about Oliver's sexual orientation, Evans said that his character "comes from very conservative parents, and there's going to be a lot of people who can relate to that, and trying to hide it ... You experiment, if you do, when you're younger. Then he decides he's not gay, and he's straight and likes women, so he tries to throw himself at different girls and see where it takes him." Acknowledging that Kyle's presence complicates Oliver's struggle, Evans also discussed the disparate personalities of "fine, upstanding cop" Oliver and the "less than ethical" Kyle:

I think there's definitely a conflict of interest there. Fish is very by the book, and does everything as he's told, and follows the rules. I think him knowing that someone he's involved with was in trouble with the law or doesn't do everything by the book, I think that causes a whole new added tension in addition to the history we already have. It changes it a little bit.

With some fans reportedly detecting "something romantic" between the characters early on, Evans stated that he and Claywell were initially unsure of their characters' mutual history, saying, "All we knew was that something had happened, but we weren't necessarily sure what it was. We had our different ideas. It's funny to see people say, 'I knew it! I knew it!.'"

== Storylines ==
Oliver Fish first appears at the Llanview Police Department in January 2008 as Antonio Vega's new partner; Oliver (often referred to simply as "Fish") is an awkward young man with technological aptitude and a strict adherence to police regulation. Formerly employed in nearby Cherryvale, Oliver is switching places with Antonio's former partner (and lover) Talia Sahid, who had requested a transfer. Oliver returns to Cherryvale so that Antonio and Talia can reunite, but he returns to Llanview occasionally to assist his colleagues, using his computer skills to aid police detective John McBain in an investigation. The following year, Oliver is set up on a blind date with Layla Williamson. Oliver hopes to spend some time with her at the "Go Red" charity ball, but she is busy as a volunteer and has dismisses Fish as a geek; on February 17, 2009, Oliver wakes up after a night of sex with party crasher Stacy Morasco. He immediately breaks things off with Layla, thinking he has met the love of his life. Oliver is disappointed when Stacy later dismisses their evening together as a one-night stand. After cutbacks on the Cherryvale police force, Oliver moves to Llanview and is working as a security guard at Llanview Hospital in March 2009 when Rex Balsom and Natalie Buchanan break in to view security tapes. Oliver is soon put back on duty with the Llanview police while Antonio is out of town on special assignment. Suspended from the force, John is doing his own investigation into a series of murders and asks Oliver to limited access to the case files. On April 1, 2009, Oliver runs into new Llanview resident Kyle Lewis, a medical student; the two recognize each other and have an uncomfortable reunion. Oliver and Kyle are later revealed to be former members of the defunct "Kappa Alpha Delta" (KAD) fraternity of Llanview University, which coincidentally is linked to the murders. When evidence surfaces seemingly linking John to the crimes on April 17, 2009, Oliver and Talia are tasked to bring him in for questioning; Talia is stabbed to death by the killer while Oliver is on the other side of the house.

Layla and Oliver begin seeing each other again. Kyle takes an unusual interest in the couple and comments to Cristian Vega that Oliver is not being honest with Layla. A protective Cristian wants to know more, but an uncomfortable Kyle vaguely maintains that though "something happened" in college, Oliver could be a different person today. Meanwhile, Oliver is hesitant about consummating his relationship with a bewildered Layla, and makes a point to advertise their relationship at the police station. Cristian reads a note Oliver leaves for Kyle asking him to stay away because Oliver is not "that guy" anymore. Confronted by Cristian, Kyle will only say that Oliver messed up a relationship in college because he cared more about what people thought, so he walked away and acted like it never happened. A sullen Kyle laments to his landlord Roxy Balsom about a guy who will not tell the truth, and she notes that he may be lying "to keep his world from spinning out of control." Confused by Oliver's need to prove himself to his fellow police officers, Layla asks him if he is gay. The accusation angers him, and he cites his night with Stacy as proof that he is not.

On August 6, 2009, Cristian puts together all that he has heard and figures out that Kyle and Oliver must have been romantically involved in college. Meanwhile, Kyle confides in a supportive Roxy that Oliver cannot admit his feelings because of his ultra-conservative family. After Roxy tells Oliver that Kyle is crazy about him, Oliver confronts Kyle. During the confrontation, Kyle reminds Oliver that they loved each other and that he still loves Oliver. Oliver claims their relationship had been a "phase" and a "failed experiment." Kyle begs Oliver to admit that it was real, finally pulling him into a kiss. Cristian stumbles upon them; Oliver pushes Kyle away and denies that he is gay, but Cristian insists that Oliver be honest with Layla, or Cristian will. Later, Oliver seems poised to open up to Layla until he receives a phone call from his parents, who are overjoyed to hear that he has a girlfriend. Oliver and Layla sleep together, and Cristian keeps silent. Oliver apologizes to a bitter Kyle but insists that he is serious about Layla. Their intimate moment is again interrupted by Cristian, but this time Kyle backs up Oliver's story that his romantic connection to Oliver has always been one-sided. Kyle realizes that Oliver will never be with him and decides to move on. When Kyle meets and makes a date with a man named Nick Chavez, Oliver remembers his recent kiss with Kyle and warns Nick away from Kyle, citing Kyle's troubles with the law. Nick inadvertently clues Layla in to Kyle and Oliver's past relationship and she confronts Oliver, who admits that he and Kyle were sleeping together in college but maintains that he is not gay, and loves her. Layla breaks up with him. The next morning he wakes up in bed with Stacy; secretly plotting to get pregnant and pass the child off as Rex Balsom's, Stacy had overheard a confrontation between Oliver and Kyle, and taking advantage of Oliver's desperate desire to be straight, had gotten him drunk and seduced him. Sick of lying and the troubles it has caused for others, Oliver returns home and finally admits that he is gay to a supportive Cristian and Layla.

In September 2009, Oliver receives a Medal of Honor from the Llanview Police Department for his assistance in bringing down a drug ring and foiling a hostage situation. His parents George and Barbara visit and come to believe that Cristian is gay when George finds a book about coming out. When George condemns Cristian, an angry Oliver defends him, and then blurts out that he is gay. George is disgusted and further troubled by Oliver's revelation that Barbara had stumbled upon him and Kyle in bed together while they were in college. George angrily storms out and, after apologizing to an emotional Oliver, Barbara follows. The next day, Oliver reveals to his mother that though he loved Kyle, he broke up with him because of Barbara's negative reaction when she walked in on them. Barbara admits that she may never understand Oliver's choices, but she still loves him. George says goodbye to Oliver but acknowledges that he cannot accept his son's "lifestyle".

Oliver and Kyle finally have the break-up talk they never had. Oliver wonders what would have happened if his mother had never walked in on them, but Kyle says that Oliver probably would not have come out any sooner, to which Oliver agrees. Cristian later encourages Oliver to tell Kyle how he feels. Oliver soon tells Kyle that he loves him and wants him back, but Kyle is now dating Nick exclusively and tells Oliver that they have both changed since college and that Oliver should move on with someone else. Oliver later witnesses Kyle accept Nick's public marriage proposal at the Buenos Dias Café. The wedding, scheduled for the following day, is part of a mass gay wedding to be broadcast on national television as a demonstration against the state laws that ban same-sex marriage. A devastated Oliver is on crowd control duty; overhearing homophobic remarks by a fellow police officer, Oliver emotionally reveals to everyone that he is gay and proud of it. Kyle tells Oliver that he is proud of him, and when the ceremony begins, Kyle realizes that he is still in love with Oliver. He stops the ceremony and declares his love for Oliver, who happily agrees to reconcile. Oliver and Kyle go on several dates so that they can reconnect; when they finally decide to consummate their new relationship, they are interrupted by the news that Nick has been gay-bashed. Determined to come between Kyle and Oliver, Nick schemes to keep them apart, first by manipulating events so that he can stay with Kyle and have Kyle take care of him as he recovers. Oliver gets suspicious of Nick, which incites an argument between Oliver and Kyle. Nick consoles an upset Kyle, and when Nick kisses him, Kyle realizes that Oliver is right about Nick. Nick comes clean and agrees to leave. Kyle tracks Oliver down and apologizes; Oliver forgives him and they finally make love.

On March 29, 2010, Oliver finds out that he is the father of Stacy's daughter Sierra. With Stacy presumed dead, Oliver and Kyle go to court seeking custody of Sierra from Stacy's sister Gigi Morasco. At first resistant, Gigi finally volunteers to surrender Sierra to Oliver. On April 12, 2010, Kyle and Oliver walk out of the courthouse, having won custody. However, Oliver lets Gigi know that he wants her, Shane, and Rex to be a part of Sierra's life.

== Conclusion ==
On March 10, 2010, TV Guide revealed that Fish and Kyle would be written off by mid-April. Executive producer Frank Valentini later released a statement stating "We are concluding the story that we set out to tell with Kyle and Fish. We are very proud to have broken new ground with a same-sex couple on daytime." Claywell stated in an interview that Valentini had told him the news the day before when he was submitting his Emmy reel, and that Evans had found out via someone tweeting him after the TV Guide article had been released. Both of them found out after their final scenes had been filmed. Evans later expressed dissatisfaction with the way he found out, saying, "With the amount of time and dedication and the effort I put forward with this story line, have the decency to call me." After the announcement, there was an outcry from fans. Various protests and campaigns were organized to protest the decision to cut the couple. ABC later released another statement, stating "The Kish story did not have the appeal we hoped it would. We are going to spend our time on stories that have a more favorable reaction from our audience." Upon Oliver's departure from the show on Monday April 12 and Kyle's exit on Friday April 16, One Life to Live hit new lows in total viewers.
