= Matthew Buchanan =

- One Life to Live character
- Robert Gorrie as Matthew Buchanan
- Portrayed by: Steven and Nicholas Towler (1999–2000); Chandler Sheaffer (2000–01); Eddie Alderson (2001–12); Robert Gorrie (2013)
- Duration: 1999–2013
- First appearance: February 22, 1999
- Last appearance: August 19, 2013
- Created by: Jill Farren Phelps
- Introduced by: Jill Farren Phelps (1999); Jennifer Pepperman (2013)
- Eddie Alderson as Matthew Buchanan
In-universe information
- Other names: Matthew Rappaport (birth name)
- Occupation: College student; Executive assistant at Buchanan Enterprises
- Family: Buchanan
- Father: Bo Buchanan
- Mother: Nora Hanen
- Half-brothers: David Vickers Buchanan; Drew Buchanan
- Half-sisters: Rachel Gannon
- Sons: Drew Buchanan II
- Grandparents: Asa Buchanan; Olympia Buchanan; Renée Divine Buchanan; Lenny Hanen; Selma Hanen
- Aunts and uncles: Clint Buchanan; Ben Davidson; Susannah Hanen
- First cousins: Cord Roberts; Natalie Buchanan; Rex Balsom; Kevin Buchanan (adoptive); Joey Buchanan (adoptive); Jessica Buchanan; C. J. Roberts; Sarah Roberts; Liam McBain; Shane Balsom; Duke Buchanan (adoptive); Bree Brennan; Ryder Ford; Zane Buchanan

Matthew Buchanan is a fictional character on the American soap opera One Life to Live. Born onscreen in 1999, the character was rapidly aged in 2001 with the casting of Eddie Alderson, re-establishing his birth year as 1994. Alderson stayed with the series until the ABC Daytime finale in 2012. Upon resuming as a web series via The Online Network, Robert Gorrie was cast in the role and debuted April 29, 2013, ultimately revising his birth year to 1992.

Matthew is the only child of Bo Buchanan and Nora Hanen, as well as the grandson of Asa Buchanan. The character's most significant storylines include his friendship with Starr Manning, played by Alderson's real-life sister, Kristen Alderson, his romances with Destiny Evans and Danielle Manning, his time as a paraplegic due to a car accident, and his feud with Nate Salinger.

== Storylines ==
In September 1998, Bo is devastated when his son Drew is killed. Nora hopes to conceive a child to give Bo a reason to live. When Nora thinks Bo cannot father children due to his test results being altered by Lindsay Rappaport, out of desperation, she turns to her old flame Sam Rappaport. The pregnancy pulls Bo back onto his feet, but he and Nora later divorce when Bo believes that Nora's son had been fathered by Sam. Sam dies in 2003, leaving a letter behind stating that Bo is actually Matthew's biological father. Matthew changes his name to Buchanan on June 17, 2005, as a Father's Day gift to Bo.

In 2008, high school freshman Matthew has trouble fitting in, but is helped by upperclassman Cole Thornhart. Matthew befriends Destiny Evans, who cannot understand his need to be liked by the popular crowd. When Matthew is publicly humiliated at a school dance, Matthew urges Cole, whom he knows is high on drugs, to drive him away. They crash, and Matthew is paralyzed from the waist down. Matthew meets with Greg Evans, who is Destiny's older brother. Greg promises that he can help Matthew walk again by performing a risky surgery. Bo and Nora refuse, so Matthew hires Téa Delgado to sue his parents for the right to make his own decision about the surgery. Bo and Nora bond on the eve of Nora's marriage to Clint Buchanan, and Matthew and Destiny see them kiss. Prior to the wedding, Matthew threatens to tell Clint if his parents do not allow him to have the surgery. They refuse, but Matthew ultimately does not reveal the truth to Clint. Matthew wins the case and decides to proceed with the surgery.

To prevent him from going through with the surgery, Bo and Nora send Matthew to a London boarding school, where he meets Danielle Rayburn, Téa's daughter. With Destiny's help, the teens escape and return to the United States, where Matthew has the surgery. He regains his ability to walk. Destiny confesses that she is in love with him, but Matthew soon shares a kiss with Dani; they eventually begin dating. However, when the two try out for the school musical, they are introduced to Nate Salinger. Dani falls for Nate and dumps Matthew at Bo and Nora's wedding. Angry at Nate, Matthew harasses him at the country club, where Matthew is a member, but Nate is an employee. Matthew is further angered when Bo gives Nate's mother, Inez, a job as his assistant.

Matthew goes to work for Clint at Buchanan Enterprises. Clint hints to Matthew that both of his parents are having affairs. This leads Matthew to Inez's apartment, where he witnesses her kissing a drugged Bo. Leaving Inez's home in tears, Matthew drives away. While trying to call Clint, he nearly collides with a car containing Nora. The body of Nate's father, Eddie Ford, whom Clint had hired to kidnap Nora, is found several hours later.

Matthew is enraged at his father until Inez finally admits that she had drugged Bo to make him think that they had sex. Rex Balsom uncovers evidence that Clint had been at the motel where Eddie had been found, but Clint reveals to Bo and Nora that he was covering for Matthew. Clint had gone to the motel to cover up all the evidence. Bo and Nora drop the charges against Clint, but keep quiet about Matthew, leading many to wonder why the charges were dropped. A reporter pressures Destiny for information about the murder, and Destiny accidentally implies that Matthew killed Eddie. Matthew later confesses to Destiny. She comforts Matthew and the end up making love.

Matthew assures Destiny that their one-night stand meant something to him. Later, Destiny confides to Dani that Matthew had killed Eddie. Nate overhears and he heads to Matthew's apartment to confront him. Nate punches Matthew, who falls back and hits his head on the table. Matthew undergoes emergency surgery. However, following the surgery, he falls into a coma. Bo and Nora send him to a facility in Philadelphia for treatment. Destiny learns that she is pregnant and tells a comatose Matthew. In November 2011, Matthew briefly flatlines before he is revived, and finally wakes from a six-month coma and realizes Destiny is pregnant. Matthew confides to Destiny that he doesn't know how he feels about being a teenage father. Destiny and Matthew welcome their son, Drew, on January 13, 2012.

In 2013, Matthew is an absentee father and shares an apartment with Dani and Jeffrey King.

== Casting and creation ==
The role was originated by child actors Steven and Nicholas Towler in February 1999 upon the character's onscreen birth. The Towler brothers vacated the role in June 2000. Ian Chandler Sheaffer from July 2000 to the spring of 2001. Eddie Alderson assumed the role in April 2001, on a recurring basis and first appeared on May 10, 2001. According to costar Hillary B. Smith, Alderson's casting was a bit unconventional. She revealed during an interview that at the time, Sheaffer was having trouble with the role. Alderson at the time was just a kid who hung around the studio because of his sister being on set. Some of a crew members, including Smith recommended Alderson as the new Matthew and then executive producer, Gary Tomlin agreed. After seven years on a recurring basis, Alderson signed a long-term contract in December 2008. Alderson departed from the series on August 10, 2011. In October 2011, Alderson revealed that he had started taping scenes again and was set to reappear in November 2011. Upon the serial's cancellation by ABC, it was picked up by Prospect Park to continue as an online web series. However, Alderson and his sister Kristen chose to relocate to California to explore other options. Alderson made his last official appearance in the role of Matthew in the finale episode which aired on January 13, 2012. With Alderson now living in Los Angeles, it was announced on January 17, 2013, that the role will be recast when new daily episodes of OLTL are scheduled to begin airing on Hulu via The Online Network in April 2013. On February 27, 2013, at the All My Children and One Life to Live press release it was announced Robert Gorrie, who previously appeared as Nate Bradley on As the World Turns, will play Matthew when new daily episodes of OLTL are scheduled to begin airing on Hulu via The Online Network in April 2013.
