= Nora Buchanan =

Fictional character from One Life to Live

- One Life to Live character
- Hillary B. Smith as Nora Buchanan
- Portrayed by: Hillary B. Smith (1992–2019); Felicity LaFortune (2000)
- Duration: 1992–2013; 2017; 2019
- First appearance: September 23, 1992
- Last appearance: April 16, 2019
- Created by: Michael Malone
- Introduced by: Linda Gottlieb (1992); Jennifer Pepperman (2013); Frank Valentini (2017)
- Crossover appearances: All My Children; General Hospital
In-universe information
- Other names: Nora Hanen; Nora Gannon
- Occupation: Lawyer; District Attorney; Disc jockey
- Parents: Lenny Hanen; Selma Hanen
- Siblings: Susannah Hanen
- Spouse: Hank Gannon (pre–1992); Bo Buchanan (1995–99, 2010–); Daniel Colson (2005); Clint Buchanan (2009–10)
- Children: Rachel Gannon; Matthew Buchanan
- Stepchildren: David Vickers Buchanan (1995–99, 2010–); Drew Buchanan (1995–98)
- Grandchildren: Drew Buchanan II

Nora Buchanan is a fictional character from the American soap opera One Life to Live. The role was originated by Hillary B. Smith in September 1992, and she remained on the show through the original television finale on January 13, 2012. Smith reprised the role when new regular episodes of OLTL began airing on Hulu, iTunes, and FX Canada via The Online Network in April 2013. General Hospital executive producer Frank Valentini announced in January 2017 that Smith would crossover the role of Nora to General Hospital. Smith first appeared on March 6, 2017, and reappeared in November of the same year. In 2019, Smith once again reprised her role as Nora on General Hospital from April 1 to April 16 of that year.

== Casting ==
Nora is portrayed by actress Hillary B. Smith. Nora was introduced as a guest character in 1992, by head writer Michael Malone and executive producer Linda Gottlieb. Prior to her casting in One Life to Live, Smith was already an established actress in the genre of daytime drama. She had previously starred as Kit McCormick on The Doctors in 1982, and one year later, took over the role of Margo Hughes on As the World Turns, a role she played from 1983 to 1989. When she won the role of Nora on the show, producers were impressed with her hard-nosed approach to the character but wanted Smith to become a redhead and show Nora's soft side. Her first front-burner storyline was a six-week trial in which she defended Todd Manning and his fraternity brothers, who were accused of gang-raping college student Marty Saybrooke. The actress said in an interview with Soap Opera Digest, "When [then-Executive Producer] Linda Gottlieb told me [Nora] would be representing the rapists and would get them off, I was nauseated. To let the rapists get off — I thought that was a really bad message." Smith later persuaded the writers to change the outcome and a mistrial was declared.

Almost immediately after her debut, Nora became a centerpiece of the show, particularly for her involvement in the multiple-Emmy Award winning rape trial storyline. Smith considered leaving the drama on several occasions. In 2000, Felicity LaFortune pinch-hit for Smith while she was on leave. When her contract was set to expire in 2005, Smith's character was put into a six-month coma. However, she signed another four-year contract that following December. Smith inked a new contract again in 2010, making her a mainstay on the soap for twenty years.

In January 2017, it was revealed that Smith would reprise her role as Nora on General Hospital, making her the first One Life to Live actress to cross over to another soap since the end of Prospect Park's lawsuit against ABC. She first appeared on March 6, 2017. On November 10, 2017, it was announced that Smith would return to General Hospital from November 13 to 21, 2017. Smith once again returned to General Hospital from April 1 to April 16, 2019.

== Storylines ==
=== One Life to Live ===
When Nora debuted in 1992, she quickly made a connection with fans for her backstory as the Jewish attorney and ex-wife of previously established African American Llanview District Attorney, Hank Gannon, and mother to Rachel. She has an older sister, Susannah Hanen, a psychiatrist. Nora's popularity continued to grow as she played a key role in some of the show's most popular storylines on the 1990s, most notably the Marty Saybrooke gang rape trial in 1993. The character is also known for her supercouple romance with Bo Buchanan, culminating in their popular 1995 rock 'n' roll-themed wedding.

Nora meets Bo in October 1992; that Thanksgiving, he and his wife Sarah are involved in a hit and run accident and Sarah is killed. Over the next several months, Nora and Bo work side by side trying to track down the killer. The case is finally closed and the two become best friends; slowly their relationship grows into romance after a kiss on New Year's Eve. Bo and Nora first have sex in April 1993. However, Nora's chronic headaches worsen, leading her to believe that she had caused the accident that led to Sarah's death. Bo soon proves this to be false and proposes marriage. During Nora's recovery from a brain tumor, she is terrorized by former client Todd Manning, whom she had betrayed while defending him for Marty's rape, leading to his conviction. Bo and Nora marry on June 1, 1995.

Bo is devastated when his son Drew is killed. Nora hopes to conceive a child to give Bo a reason to live; out of desperation, she turns to former lover, Sam Rappaport. The pregnancy pulls Bo back onto his feet, but he and Nora later divorce when Sam's jealous ex-wife, Lindsay, publicly reveals that Nora's son had been fathered by Sam. Sam dies in 2003, leaving behind a letter which reveals that Bo is the biological father of Nora's son, Matthew.

In 2004, Nora begins to date District Attorney Daniel Colson, and he eventually proposes. After their wedding, Nora begins to suspect that Daniel is having an affair. When Daniel is set to be sworn in as Lieutenant Governor of Pennsylvania, he is arrested for the murders of Paul Cramer and Jennifer Rappaport. Nora learns of Daniel's homosexual affair with Mark Solomon, and Daniel is soon sent to prison.

Nora suffers a stroke and becomes comatose for months. After waking from her coma, Nora begins to put her life back on track. Nora's house catches fire, and she realizes that she was another victim of racist arsonist, Tate Harmon. Her former father-in-law, Asa Buchanan, invites Nora and Matthew to move in indefinitely. After Asa's death, he leaves the mansion to Nora in his will. During their time in Texas for the will reading, Nora and Clint Buchanan begin a romantic relationship.

Nora and Bo's teenage son, Matthew, is in a car accident with Marty's teenaged son, Cole Thornhart, who has become a drug addict. He survives, but is paralyzed from the waist down. Nora, who had taken in Cole after the supposed death of his mother, is furious and initially wants to send Cole to prison. However, remembering Rachel's own drug addiction, she changes her mind and allows Cole to go into rehab instead.

Dealing with Matthew's paralysis brings Bo and Nora closer, sparking Clint's jealousy. Clint calls neurosurgeon Dr. Greg Evans, who is confident that he can restore the use of Matthew's legs, but when he cannot guarantee that Matthew will survive the operation, Nora and Bo refuse to allow Greg to operate. Furious, Matthew hires Téa Delgado to sue his parents for the right to make the choice for himself. The matter is complicated when, on the night before Nora's wedding to Clint, Matthew catches his parents passionately kissing. He attempts to blackmail them into giving consent for the surgery; they call his bluff and ultimately Matthew cannot intentionally hurt Clint by telling him what he saw.

Bo's growing feelings for Nora seem to be reciprocated, but a confused Nora simply will not allow herself to hurt Clint by pursuing them. Shortly after her wedding to Clint, Matthew sues Bo and Nora for the right to have the operation. Bo and Nora grow closer as they unite to stop Matthew. When they take him to London, they finally confess their true feelings for each other and passionately kiss. Clint later finds out about Nora's feelings for Bo and confronts her; she admits that she's fallen back in love with Bo, and Clint quickly divorces her.

Shortly after Bo and Nora's reunion, he is shot but survives. Bo and Nora remarry in June 2010. Several months into their marriage, Nora becomes jealous of Bo's new secretary, Inez Salinger. Inez begins dating Clint, who blackmails her into seducing Bo as revenge against Bo and Nora for humiliating him with their reunion. Clint also pays Inez's ex-husband, Eddie Ford, to kidnap Nora and hold her hostage while Inez drugs Bo in an attempt to make him think they'd slept together. Though Eddie tries to rape Nora, she is eventually rescued, and Eddie is shot and killed shortly thereafter. Nora leaves Bo when she learns of his "affair" with Inez, but once Inez confesses to drugging Bo, Nora takes him back.

Bo and Nora focus on finding Eddie Ford's killer and are stunned when Clint informs them that it was Matthew. After much soul-searching, Bo and Nora decide to keep Matthew's role in the murder a secret. Bo and Nora welcome their grandson, Drew Buchanan II, to their family on the series finale, which aired on January 13, 2012.

To Nora and Bo's dismay, Matthew is not an involved father to his son. Regardless, Nora and Bo gladly accept the role of grandparents and offer support Drew. Nora also finds time to return to her college passion of doling out advice as a disc jockey. With Bo's encouragement, she begins hosting a radio call-in program as the “Nightbird.”

=== General Hospital ===
Nora arrives in Port Charles, New York in March 2017, first appearing in an encounter Diane Miller. Nora is the hired private lawyer for Valentin Cassadine in a child custody lawsuit for his daughter, Charlotte, against her biological mother Lulu Spencer Falconeri.
