= Lenny Platt =

American actor (born 1984)

- Born: July 25, 1984 (age 42); Philadelphia, Pennsylvania, U.S.
- Education: University of Florida (BA)
- Occupation: Actor
- Years active: 2010–present

Lenny Platt (born July 25, 1984) is an American actor known for his portrayal of Nate Salinger on the US daytime soap opera One Life to Live from 2010 to 2012 and FBI recruit Drew Perales on the ABC thriller Quantico in 2016.

== Early life ==
Born in Philadelphia, Pennsylvania, Platt moved with his family to Florida at age 12. He graduated in criminology from the University of Florida in 2006.

== Career ==
Platt began portraying the recurring role of Nate Salinger on the US daytime soap opera One Life to Live in April 2010, and was put on contract with the series in October 2010. His last appearance on One Life to Live was in January 2012 when the show was cancelled by ABC. Platt next played guest roles on two other New York-based series, Law & Order: Special Victims Unit and Blue Bloods, in 2013. He also voiced the character Gianni in the video game Grand Theft Auto V. Platt appeared in multiple episodes of ABC's How to Get Away with Murder as college quarterback Griffin O'Reilly in 2014 and 2015. In 2016, Platt portrayed the recurring role of FBI recruit Drew Perales on the ABC thriller Quantico.

On February 24, 2017, it was announced that Platt was cast in a recurring role as Felix in the CBS television pilot Perfect Citizen. However, the network passed on the pilot in May 2017.

Recently, Platt starred as Sgt. Kyle Ormond in the National Geographic miniseries The Hot Zone.

== Filmography ==
=== Television ===
Year	Project	Role	Notes	Ref.
2010–2012	One Life to Live	Nate Salinger	Contract	
2013	Law & Order: Special Victims Unit	Travis Holmes	Episode: "Girl Dishonored" (Season 14)	
2013	Blue Bloods	Joe Ferraro	2 episodes	
2014–2015	How to Get Away with Murder	Griffin O'Reilly	5 episodes	
2015	Gotham	Luke Garrett	2 episodes	
2016	Quantico	Drew Perales	Recurring	
2018	Perfect Citizen	Felix	Unsold television pilot	
2019	The Hot Zone	Sgt. Kyle Ormond	Recurring, 6 episodes	
2019–2020	NCIS: New Orleans	Detective David Cabrera	2 episodes	
2026	Daredevil: Born Again	Lieutenant Governor Gomez	3 episodes	

=== Film ===
Year	Project	Role	Notes	Ref.
2025	The Dutchman	Officer Barnes		

=== Video games ===
Year	Title	Role	References
2013	Grand Theft Auto V	Gianni	
