= David A. Gregory =

American actor and writer (born 1985)

- Born: David Andrew Gregory; August 19, 1985 (age 40); Fairbanks, Alaska, U.S.
- Education: Baldwin Wallace University (BM)
- Occupations: Actor, model
- Years active: 2005–present
- Height: 5 ft 10 in (178 cm)

David Andrew Gregory is an American actor and writer. He portrayed Robert Ford on the soap opera One Life to Live from 2009 until the show ended in 2012. He wrote and produced “Powder Burns”, the scripted Western podcast starring John Wesley Shipp as a blind sheriff, which premiered on Apple Podcasts in 2015 to rave reviews and earned Gregory a Voice Arts Award in 2017. On TV, he was a recurring actor on The Good Fight, Insatiable, Constantine, and Deception.

== Early life ==
Gregory was born and raised in Fairbanks, Alaska, as the middle of three sons. He danced at North Star Ballet and did plays with Fairbanks Drama Association and Fairbanks Light Opera Theater. In the summer of 2003, prior to his senior year of high school, Gregory attended Interlochen Arts Camp and took home one of the institution's top honors, The Maddy Award for Excellence in Musical Theater, for his role as the Fairy Godmother in Sweet Charity.

He began his collegiate study at Baldwin-Wallace College (now Baldwin Wallace University), where appeared as Owen in Brian Friel's Translations, Oberon in A Midsummer Night's Dream, and as Creon in Seamus Heaney's The Burial at Thebes, for which he won the theater department's award for Best Actor in a Play. In 2008, he graduated with a Bachelor of Music degree in musical theatre. The same year, he earned his Equity card while appearing in The Full Monty for the now-defunct American Musical Theatre of San Jose.

== Career ==
Gregory made his professional debut in 2005 at Porthouse Theater as Riff in West Side Story. During college, he also appeared as Ferdinand in The Tempest for Great Lakes Theater and its sister company, Idaho Shakespeare Festival.

David began a two-week stint on ABC's One Life to Live in the summer of 2009. He was offered a contract that fall and stayed with the show until its cancellation. After One Life to Live ended in 2012, Gregory guest-starred on multiple television series, including a season-long arc on the short-lived NBC series Deception. In 2014, he appeared in Hartford Stage's Vanya and Sonia and Masha and Spike, earning a Connecticut Critics Circle Award nomination and appearing on the cover of American Theater magazine in the role the next year.

Gregory's audio Western, "Powder Burns," won the Voice Arts Award for Outstanding Storytelling/Best Performance for an episode dealing with Alzheimer's disease. John Wesley Shipp and Ed Asner starred opposite Gregory in the episode. Western Writers of America hailed the production as "Darn Good Entertainment. The Future of Westerns."

Gregory's play Hank & Jim Build a Plane was workshopped at the Last Frontier Theatre Conference in Valdez, Alaska, and at Le Petit Theatre du Vieux Carre in New Orleans. The drama follows Henry Fonda and James Stewart, best friends, movie stars, yet political opposites as they grapple with their differences on the night Henry's daughter Jane takes her famous trip to Vietnam. The play has been optioned by Tony Award-winning producers Jack W. Batman and Bruce Robert Harris at SunnySpot Productions in New York.

In June 2023, Gregory starred as Juror #8 in a sold-out run of Twelve Angry Men at The Powerhouse Theatre in New Canaan, Connecticut.

== Personal life ==
Gregory lives and works in New York City, with his wife, Broadway performer Jennifer Noble. They have been together since college.

== Filmography ==
=== Film ===
| Year | Title | Role | Notes |
|---|---|---|---|
| 2010 | How Do You Know | Matty's Teammate | |
| 2012 | Excuse Me for Living | Bruce | |
| 2015 | Chasing Yesterday | Matthew | |
| 2016 | Give Me My Baby | Jason | |
| 2019 | Dirty Sexy Saint | Clay Kincaid | |

=== Television ===
| Year | Title | Role | Notes |
|---|---|---|---|
| 2008 | Law & Order | Mr. Harvey Stocker | Episode: "Sweetie" |
| 2009–2012 | One Life to Live | Robert Ford | 276 episodes |
| 2012 | Gossip Girl | Aiden Hill | Episode: "It Girl, Interrupted" |
| 2013 | Deception | Kyle Farrell | 8 episodes |
| 2014 | Elementary | Nicholas Orman | Episode: "Corpse De Ballet" |
| 2014 | Constantine | Eddie | 2 episodes |
| 2015 | Youthful Daze | Richie Kingsly | 21 episodes |
| 2016 | The Night Shift | Carter Stafford | Episode: "Burned" |
| 2017 | The Good Fight | Zach Devine | 2 episodes |
| 2017 | Bull | Kelvin Li | Episode: "Bring It On" |
| 2018 | Instinct | Jeff Johnson | Episode: "Flat Line" |
| 2018 | Shades of Blue | Graham | Episode: "The Hollow Crown" |
| 2018, 2019 | Insatiable | Shane | 2 episodes |
| 2020 | Mélange | Hunter Black | Episode: "Pilot" |
| 2021 | Here to There | Andrew McGinniss | 3 episodes |
| 2022 | Uncoupled | Corey | Episode: "Chapter 7" |
