= Gina Tognoni =

American actress (born 1973)

- Born: November 28, 1973 (age 52); St. Louis, Missouri, U.S.
- Occupations: Actress; businesswoman
- Years active: 1995–present
- Television: One Life to Live (1995–2002, 2010–2011); Guiding Light (2004–2009); The Young and the Restless (2014–2019)
- Spouse: Joseph Chiarello (m. 2009)

Gina Tognoni /toʊnˈjoʊni/ (born November 28, 1973) is an American actress, best known for her work with American daytime soap operas. Her most notable performances include Kelly Cramer on One Life to Live, Dinah Marler on Guiding Light and Phyllis Summers on The Young and the Restless.

== Career ==
Tognoni is known for her roles on daytime television soap operas. In 1995, she made her soap debut as Kelly Cramer in ABC's One Life to Live. She appeared on the show until 2001. In April 2001, it was announced that Tognoni, after six years with the show, had decided not to renew her contract with the series. Tognoni returned to daytime television as Dinah Marler on CBS's Guiding Light in July 2004, and won her first Daytime Emmy Award for Outstanding Supporting Actress in a Drama Series in 2006 for her work on the show. In 2007, she was nominated again in the same category but lost to Genie Francis. She won her second Emmy in 2008, becoming only the second actress to be a repeat winner in the Supporting Actress category.

In 2009, after CBS canceled Guiding Light, Tognoni returned to her role as Kelly Cramer on One Life to Live. Also it was reported that Tognoni was in talks with several soaps for her post-Guiding Light gig. Following the April 2011 cancelation of One Life to Live and All My Children, it was announced that Tognoni and co-star Tom Degnan, who was portraying Joey Buchanan at the time, would exit the series before its January 2012 finale. In addition to her career on soaps, Tognoni had guest-starring roles in Law & Order: Special Victims Unit and The Sopranos, and co-starred in a number of television shows and independent films.

On May 22, 2014, it was announced that Tognoni was cast as Phyllis Summers in CBS's The Young and the Restless, replacing Michelle Stafford. Tognoni made her debut on August 11, 2014. At the 42nd Daytime Emmy Awards in 2015, Tognoni was nominated for Outstanding Lead Actress for her role as Phyllis Summers. At the 44th Daytime Emmy Awards in 2017, she was again nominated for Outstanding Lead Actress for which she won. On March 30, 2019, it was announced that Tognoni would be leaving The Young and the Restless, following the decision to fire her while in contract and return Stafford to the role. Tognoni's last appearance in the role aired on June 7, 2019.

== Personal life ==
Tognoni was born in St. Louis, Missouri. She won Miss Rhode Island Teen USA in 1991 and Miss Rhode Island Teen All-American in 1993. Tognoni became engaged to Joseph Chiarello on November 21, 2007. She was introduced to him by her co-star Beth Ehlers. The two were married May 16, 2009.

== Filmography ==
List of acting performances in film and television
| Year | Title | Role | Notes |
|---|---|---|---|
| 1995–2002, 2010–2011 | One Life to Live | Kelly Cramer | Series regular |
| 2002 | Pride & Loyalty | Stephanie | |
| 2003 | Fastlane | Gabriella | Episode: "Iced" |
| 2003 | This Time Around | Cara Cabot | Television film |
| 2003 | Phenomenon II | Officer Claire | Television film |
| 2004–2009 | Guiding Light | Dinah Marler | Series regular |
| 2005 | Law & Order: Special Victims Unit | Officer Kristen Vaill | Episode: "Goliath" |
| 2005 | Art | Barbara | Short film |
| 2006 | The Sopranos | Catherine Lipman | Episode: "The Fleshy Part of the Thigh" |
| 2009 | Venice: The Series | Sami Nelson | Web series |
| 2011 | In the Family | Nurse Jackson | |
| 2014–2019 | The Young and the Restless | Phyllis Summers | Series regular |

== Awards and nominations ==
List of acting awards and nominations for Gina Tognoni
| Year | Award | Category | Title | Result | Ref. |
|---|---|---|---|---|---|
| 1996 | Soap Opera Digest Award | Outstanding Female Newcomer | One Life to Live | Nominated | |
| 1997 | Soap Opera Digest Award | Outstanding Younger Lead Actress | One Life to Live | Nominated | |
| 1998 | Soap Opera Digest Award | Outstanding Younger Lead Actress | One Life to Live | Nominated | |
| 2005 | Soap Opera Digest Award | Favorite Return | Guiding Light | Nominated | |
| 2006 | Daytime Emmy Award | Outstanding Supporting Actress in a Drama Series | Guiding Light | Won | |
| 2007 | Daytime Emmy Award | Outstanding Supporting Actress in a Drama Series | Guiding Light | Nominated | |
| 2008 | Daytime Emmy Award | Outstanding Supporting Actress in a Drama Series | Guiding Light | Won | |
| 2015 | Daytime Emmy Award | Outstanding Lead Actress in a Drama Series | The Young and the Restless | Nominated | |
| 2017 | Daytime Emmy Award | Outstanding Lead Actress in a Drama Series | The Young and the Restless | Won | |

| First | Kelly Cramer (role); 1995–2002; 2010–11 | Succeeded by Tracy Melchior |
| Preceded by Heather Tom | Kelly Cramer (role); 1995–2002; 2010–11 | None |
| Preceded by Michelle Stafford | Phyllis Summers (role); 2014–19 | Succeeded by Michelle Stafford |
