= Cole Thornhart =

Fictional character from One Life to Live

- One Life to Live character
- Van Hughes as Cole Thornhart
- Portrayed by: Brandon Buddy (2006–2010); Van Hughes (2012)
- Duration: 2006–2010, 2012
- First appearance: October 10, 2006
- Last appearance: February 28, 2012
- Created by: Dena Higley
- Introduced by: Frank Valentini
- Crossover appearances: General Hospital
- Brandon Buddy as Cole Thornhart
In-universe information
- Occupation: Student; Starr Manning's bodyguard
- Parents: Patrick Thornhart; Marty Saybrooke
- Daughters: Hope Manning-Thornhart
- Grandparents: David Saybrooke; Samantha Saybrooke
- Aunts and uncles: Ian Thornhart; Granya Thornhart; Kiki Saybrooke
- First cousins: Daniel Thornhart

Cole Thornhart is a fictional character from the American daytime dramas One Life to Live and General Hospital.

== Casting ==
Cole was portrayed by Brandon Buddy from October 10, 2006, to November 10, 2010. In October 2011, it was announced that Buddy would return as Cole. However, he taped for only one day before leaving for undisclosed personal reasons. On November 1, 2011, it was announced that Van Hughes would take over the role of Cole. He played Cole from January 3, 2012, to January 13, 2012. On January 30, 2012, it was announced that Hughes would temporarily reprise his role of Cole to help usher in Alderson's Starr Manning to General Hospital.

When asked about the possibility of bringing back Cole or Hope to the new online reboot of One Life to Live, executive producer Jennifer Pepperman had the following to say:

"I was really shocked as a viewer when Cole and Hope were killed and I know on soap operas people say you can bring people back from the dead, but that is something that I feel strongly, and Prospect Park feels strongly about, and that is not bringing people back from the dead. That is one of the things that never really feels right, but I am afraid that ABC killed Cole and Hope, and also Victor Jr. III (Tea and Victor Jr. son) and those are real losses for the show."

== Backstory ==
Cole Thornhart was born off-screen to Patrick Thornhart and Marty Saybrooke. Patrick and Marty lived in Ireland briefly with newborn Cole before relocating to San Diego. However, on Christmas 2005, Patrick was purportedly killed. Marty decided to move back to Llanview with Cole in September 2006.
