= Frank Valentini =

American producer

- Genres: Soap opera
- Occupations: Executive producer, director, composer

Frank Valentini is the executive producer for the ABC soap opera General Hospital. He previously held the position of executive producer, director, and composer for the ABC soap opera One Life to Live. From 1986 to 1992, he worked as stage manager. In 1992, he was promoted to associate producer, assuming full producer duties in 1995. In 2003, he became executive producer, replacing Gary Tomlin.

Under his direction as executive producer and director, Valentini led One Life to Live to its first Emmy win for Outstanding Drama Series Directing Team since 1983 as well as the show's first win for Outstanding Drama Series Writing Team since 1994. Valentini's reputation for attracting talent both from the acting community and the music world has garnered critical praise from both industry and mainstream press. He was able to secure guest appearances from Nelly Furtado, the Pussycat Dolls and others.

In 2010, Valentini directed a 10-part series of webisodes for ABC's What If... campaign, containing a mash-up of General Hospital, One Life to Live, and All My Children characters.

== Awards and nominations ==
- Won:

Daytime Emmy Awards

- (2025) Daytime Emmy Award for Outstanding Drama Series for General Hospital
- (2024) Daytime Emmy Award for Outstanding Drama Series for General Hospital
- (2023) Daytime Emmy Award for Outstanding Drama Series for General Hospital
- (2022) Daytime Emmy Award for Outstanding Drama Series for General Hospital
- (2021) Daytime Emmy Award for Outstanding Drama Series for General Hospital
- (2017) Daytime Emmy Award for Outstanding Drama Series for General Hospital
- (2016) Daytime Emmy Award for Outstanding Drama Series for General Hospital
- (2002) Daytime Emmy Award for Outstanding Drama Series for One Life to Live

- (2024) Daytime Emmy Award for Outstanding Drama Series Directing Team for General Hospital
- (2023) Daytime Emmy Award for Outstanding Drama Series Directing Team for General Hospital
- (2022) Daytime Emmy Award for Outstanding Drama Series Directing Team for General Hospital
- (2021) Daytime Emmy Award for Outstanding Drama Series Directing Team for General Hospital
- (2020) Daytime Emmy Award for Outstanding Drama Series Directing Team for General Hospital
- (2017) Daytime Emmy Award for Outstanding Drama Series Directing Team for General Hospital
- (2016) Daytime Emmy Award for Outstanding Drama Series Directing Team for General Hospital
- (2009) Daytime Emmy Award for Outstanding Drama Series Directing Team for One Life to Live
- (2008) Daytime Emmy Award for Outstanding Drama Series Directing Team for One Life to Live

- (2010) Daytime Emmy for Outstanding Direction for the What If... web series

GLAAD Media Awards

- (2009) GLAAD Media Award for Outstanding Daily Dram
- (2005) GLAAD Media Award for Outstanding Daily Drama
- Nominations:

Daytime Emmy Awards

- (2011) Daytime Emmy Award for Outstanding Drama Series Directing Team for One Life to Live
- (2008) Daytime Emmy Award for Outstanding Drama Series for One Life to Live
- (2007) Daytime Emmy Award for Outstanding Drama Series for One Life to Live
- (2004) Daytime Emmy Award for Outstanding Drama Series Directing Team for One Life to Live
- (2004) Daytime Emmy for Outstanding Original Song for One Life to Live for Flash of Light, co-composed by Paul Glass
- (2000) Daytime Emmy Award for Outstanding Drama Series for One Life to Live

Directors Guild of America Awards

- (2003) DGA Award Outstanding Directorial Achievement in Daytime Serials for One Life to Live for directing episode #8656.
