= List of One Life to Live characters =

This is a list of characters that have appeared on the ABC Daytime and TOLN soap opera, One Life to Live.

== A ==
Character	Actor(s)	Duration	Ref.
Becky Lee Abbott	Jill Voight	1977–78	
Becky Lee Abbott	Mary Gordon Murray	1979–86, 1988, 1996, 1998, 2001	
Richard Abbott	Luke Reilly	1977–79	
Richard Abbott	Keith Langsdale	1980	
Richard Abbott	Robert Gribbon	1980–81	
Richard Abbott	Jeffrey Byron	1986–87	
Audrey Ames	Fia Porter	1988–89	
Andrew	Jai Rodriguez	2005	
Seth Anderson	Brandon Routh	2001–02	
Seth Anderson	Steve Richard Harris	2002–03	
Kimberly Andrews	Amanda Setton	2009–11	
Bryan Angell	Michael McGuire	1997	
Eleanor Armitage	Jessica Walter	1996–97	
Guy Armitage	Simon Jones	1997	
Ian Armitage	Will Kempe	1997–98	
Arthur "Rack 'Em Up"	Vincent Pastore	2003–04	
Helena Ashley	Augusta Dabney	1979	
Maggie Ashley	Jacqueline Courtney	1979	
Pat Ashley	Jacqueline Courtney	1975–83	
Grace Atherton	Susan Gibney	1994	
Hunter Atwood	Zach Roerig	2007	
Cole Avery	Leif Riddell	2003	

== B ==
Character	Actor(s)	Duration	Ref.
Corinne Balsom	Ann Hamilton	2002, 2008–09	
Rex Balsom	John-Paul Lavoisier	2002–12	
Roxy Balsom	Ilene Kristen	2001–12	
Arturo Bandini	Paolo Seganti	2013	
Charlie Banks	Brian Kerwin	2007–11	
Jared Banks	John Brotherton	2007–10	
Hayes Barber	Jed S. Orlemann	2005	
Annie Barnes	Rebecca Schaeffer	1985	
Jeff Barnes	David Aaron Baker	1999	
Jeff Barnes	Michael Magee	1999–2000	
Bart Baron	Lloyd Hollar	1985	
Lisa Baron	Laura Carrington	1985–86	
Sarah Barry	Dina Andrews	1993–96	
Neville Bartholomew-Smythe	Peter Bartlett	2009–10	
Nigel Bartholomew-Smythe	Peter Bartlett	1991–2013	
Babs Bartlett	Carole Shelley	1994	
Bruce Bartlett	Robert Leeshock	2005–06	
Susan Bates	Alice Haining	1986	
Claire Baxter	Haviland Morris	2001–03	
Brian Beckett	Grainger Hines	1984–85	
Lily Beecham	Melody Combs	1990	
Benny Benitez	Benny Nieves	1987	
Amelia Bennett	Tia Dionne Hodge	2008–09	
Chad Bennett	Teddy Sears	2001–02	
Connie Bensoncroft	Gloria Biegler	1994	
Mortimer Bern	Thom Christopher	1992–93, 1997	
Wilma Bern	Eileen Heckart	1992	
Wilma Bern	Elaine Stritch	1993	
Andrew Berryman	Patrick Horgan	1985-86	
Cornelius Blackwell	Athol Fugard	1988	
Ursula Blackwell	Jill Larson	1988–89	
Blade	Ron Eldard	1989	
Alex Blair	Peter Brouwer	1975	
Bobby Blue	Blair Underwood	1985–86	
Miriam Blue	Janet Hubert	1989	
Michelle Boudin	Dana Barron	1984–85	
Maude Boylan	Helen Gallagher	1997–98	
Emma Bradley	Farah Fath	2008	
Regina Braun	Suzanne Granfield	1984	
Bree Brennan	Samantha and Jessica Schaffhauser	2006	
Bree Brennan	Carly and Sam Wolfe	2006–08	
Bree Brennan	Brooke and Kiley Liddell	2008	
Bree Brennan	Stephanie Schmahl	2008–11	
Cindy Brennan	Jan Maxwell	2009	
Nash Brennan	Forbes March	2005–08	
Phil Brennan	John Wojda	2009	
Adam Brewster	John Mansfield	1978–79	
Alanna Brickner	Kelly Cheston Young	1992	
Charlie Briggs	Robert Hogan	1995–98, 2000	
Diane Bristol	Mary Ward	1986	
Earl Brock	Kevin Conway	1973	
Harrison Brooks	Kevin Dobson	2003–04	
Harrison Brooks	Andrew Masset	2004–05	
Dr. Curt Bruner	Michael O'Gorman	1988	
Asa Buchanan	Phil Carey	1979–2008	
Asa Buchanan	Brian Smiar	2000 (temporary)	
Asa Buchanan	Robert S. Woods	2008 (1968 storyline)	
Asa Buchanan	Brian Victor Johnson	2008 (1968 storyline)	
Austin Buchanan	David Gautreaux	1989-1990	
Blaize Buchanan	Loyita Chapel (Note: Loyita Chapel is married to Robert S. Woods (Bo Buchanan).)	1988 (Old West storyline)	
Bo Buchanan	Robert S. Woods	1979–86, 1988–2013	
Bo Buchanan	John-Paul Lavoisier	2008 (1968 storyline)	
Bo Buchanan	Tanner Woods	2008 (1968 storyline)	
Buck Buchanan	Phil Carey	1988 (Old West storyline)	
Clint Buchanan	Clint Ritchie	1979–99, 2003–04	
Clint Buchanan	Jerry verDorn	2005–13	
Clint Buchanan	John Brotherton	2008 (1968 storyline)	
Drew Buchanan II	Elijah and Isaiah Ford	2013	
Duke Buchanan	Adam and Connor O'Brien	1992	
Duke Buchanan	David and Michael DeFranco	1993–94	
Duke Buchanan	Matthew Metzger	2004–06	
Drew Buchanan	Keith Bogart	1988–89	
Drew Buchanan	Victor Browne	1996–97	
Drew Buchanan	Samuel Ball	1998	
Jessica Buchanan	Janelle and Tamara DeMent	1986–88	
Jessica Buchanan	Alex and Brittany Smith	1988	
Jessica Buchanan	Eliza Clark	1990	
Jessica Buchanan	Erin Torpey	1990–2003	
Jessica Buchanan	Maggie Andersson	1998 (temporary)	
Jessica Buchanan	Bree Williamson	2003–12	
Jessica Buchanan	Nadine Jacobson	2008 (flashbacks)	
Joey Buchanan	Ryan Morris	1982–83	
Joey Buchanan	John Paul Learn	1983–90	
Joey Buchanan	Chris McKenna	1990–93	
Joey Buchanan	Nathan Fillion	1994–97, 2007	
Joey Buchanan	Don Jeffcoat	1997–2001	
Joey Buchanan	Jeremy Fonicello	1998 (temporary)	
Joey Buchanan	Bruce Michael Hall	2003–04	
Joey Buchanan	Tom Degnan	2010–11	
Kevin Buchanan	Morgan K. Melis	1976–81	
Kevin Buchanan	Chris Cunningham	1981–82	
Kevin Buchanan	Jonathan Brandis	1982–83	
Kevin Buchanan	Ryan Janis	1983–90	
Kevin Buchanan	Matthew Vipond	1990–91	
Kevin Buchanan	Joey Thrower	1991–92	
Kevin Buchanan	Kirk Geiger	1992–94	
Kevin Buchanan	Jack Armstrong	1994–95	
Kevin Buchanan	Ken Kenitzer	1995	
Kevin Buchanan	Kevin Stapleton	1996–98	
Kevin Buchanan	Timothy Gibbs	1998–2001	
Kevin Buchanan	Dan Gauthier	2003–07, 2009–10	
Matthew Buchanan	Steven and Nicholas Towler	1999–2000	
Matthew Buchanan	Ian Chandler Sheaffer	2000–01	
Matthew Buchanan	Eddie Alderson	2001–12	
Matthew Buchanan	Robert Gorrie	2013	
Megan Buchanan	Erin Torpey	2008	
Natalie Buchanan	Janelle and Tamara DeMent	1986	
Natalie Buchanan	Melissa Archer	2001–13	
Olympia Buchanan	Taina Elg	1980–82	
Olympia Buchanan	Catherine Hickland	2008 (1968 storyline)	
Pike Buchanan	Don Chastain	1980	
Pike Buchanan	Tom Atkins	1989	
Zane Buchanan	Jack Ferrantini	2006	
Garth Buckley	Alan Coates	1988	
Steve Burke	Bernie Grant	1970–75	
Eunice Burns	Jackie Hoffman	2009	
Lindsey Butler	Anna Kathryn Holbrook	1993	

== C ==
Character	Actor(s)	Duration	Ref.
Beaver Calhoun	Peter Brouwer	2007	
Roy Calhoun	Howard McGillin	1999	
Cassie Callison	Cusi Cram	1981–83	
Cassie Callison	Ava Haddad	1983–86, 1990	
Cassie Callison	Holly Gagnier	1986–88	
Cassie Callison	Laura Koffman	1991–99, 2001–04, 2010	
Herb Callison	Anthony Call	1978–93	
Babe Carey	Alexa Havins	2003–05	(Note: This character appeared as a crossover character from All My Children.)
Krystal Carey Chandler	Bobbie Eakes	2004–05	
Andrew Carpenter	Wortham Krimmer	1991–2004, 2006, 2008–10	
John Carpenter	Michael Swan	1996–97	
Maggie Carpenter	Crystal Chappell	1995–97	
River Carpenter	Alexander and Zachary Bliss	1994–95	
River Carpenter	Ryan Marsini	1996–99	
River Carpenter	Matthew Twining	2003–04	
Sloan Carpenter	Roy Thinnes	1992–95	
Camille Carr	Opal Alladin	1997	
Cyrus Carr	David Andrew Macdonald	1998	
Leo Carson	Dick Latessa	1986	
Mark Castelli	Tom Tammi	1997	
Ray Castillo	Brian Tarantina	2004	
Alberto Cervantes	Fred Melamed	1981–82	
Alberto Cervantes	Lloyd Battista	1982	
Estelle Chadwick	Elizabeth Hubbard	1983–84	
Jonas Chamberlain	Kevin Spirtas	2008	
AJ Chandler	Aidan and Liam O'Donnell	2004–05	
Adam Chandler	David Canary	2000, 2005	
JR Chandler	Jacob Young	2005	
Skye Chandler	Robin Christopher	1999–2001	
Laurel Chapin	Janice Lynde	1984–85	
Trent Chapin	David Beecroft	1984–85	
Claude Charbonneau	Luke Reilly	1997–98	
Nick Chavez	Nicholas Rodriguez	2009	
Lysander Clair	John Tillinger	1988-1989	
Elijah Clarke	Matthew R. Walton	2009–10	
Ted Clayton	Keith Charles	1980–81	
Ted Clayton	Mark Goddard	1981	
Margaret Cochran	Rebecca Mader	2004	
Margaret Cochran	Tari Signor	2004–06, 2008	
Eve Colbie	Helen Carey	1997	
Roberta "Tiny" Coleman	Shirley Stoler	1986–88	
Wade Coleman	Doug Wert	1987–89	
Astrid Collins	Marilyn McIntyre	1982	
Daniel Colson	Mark Dobies	2003–05	
Riley Colson	Jay Wilkison	2003–05	
Josie Conklin	Pamela Isaacs	2000, 2002–03	
Chip Cooper	Cain Devore	1986–87	
Gary Corelli	Jeff Fahey	1982–85	
Mario Corelli	Gerald Anthony	1978	
Alex Coronal	Roy Thinnes	1984–85	
Leo Coronal	Abe Vigoda	1984	
Rob Coronal	Ted Marcoux	1984–86	
Rob Coronal	Mark Arnold	1987–89	
Cathy Craig	Catherine Burns	1969–70	
Cathy Craig	Amy Levitt	1970–71	
Cathy Craig	Jane Alice Brandon	1971–72	
Cathy Craig	Dorrie Kavanaugh	1972–76	
Cathy Craig	Jennifer Harmon	1976–78	
Jim Craig	Robert Milli	1968–69	
Jim Craig	Nat Polen	1969–81	
Addie Cramer	Pamela Payton-Wright	1991–99, 2001–05, 2007–12	
Adriana Cramer	Amanda Cortinas	2003	
Adriana Cramer	Melissa Fumero	2004–08, 2010–11	
Betsy Cramer	Lois Smith	2003–04	
Blair Cramer	Mia Korf	1991–93	
Blair Cramer	Kassie Wesley DePaiva	1993–2013	
Dorian Cramer Lord	Nancy Pinkerton	1973–77	
Dorian Cramer Lord	Dixie Carter	1974 (temporary)	
Dorian Cramer Lord	Claire Malis	1977–79	
Dorian Cramer Lord	Robin Strasser	1979–87, 1993–2000, 2003–11, 2013	
Dorian Cramer Lord	Elaine Princi	1990–93	
Kelly Cramer	Gina Tognoni	1995–2002, 2010–11	
Kelly Cramer	Tracy Melchior	2003	
Kelly Cramer	Heather Tom	2003–06	
Lou Cramer	Peter Galman	1997–98	
Melinda Cramer	Patricia Pearcy	1973–74	
Melinda Cramer	Jane Badler	1977–81, 1983	
Melinda Cramer	Sharon Gabet	1987–89	
Melinda Cramer	Nicole Orth-Pallavicini	1997, 2004	
Melinda Cramer	Christiana Anbri	1997–98 (flashbacks)	
Paul Cramer	Brock Cuchna	2003–04	
Paul Cramer	David Tom	2004–05	
Paul Cramer	Shane McRae	2004 (temporary)	
Beverly Crane	Maeve McGuire	1994–95	
Ethel Crawford	Bethel Leslie	1994	
Muffy Critchlow	Faith Ford	1983	
Christine Cromwell	Susan Floyd	1988–89	
Leo Cromwell	Alan Scarfe	1988–89	
Ed Crosby	Scott Bryce	2006–07	
Rae Cummings	Linda Dano	1978–80, 1999–2004	
Rae Cummings	Anna Stuart	2002 (temporary)	

== D ==
Character	Actor(s)	Duration	Ref.
Marco Dane	Gerald Anthony	1977–86, 1989–90	
Ben Davidson	Mark Derwin	1999–2002, 2004, 2008	
Grace Davidson	Susan Misner	1999	
Grace Davidson	Bailey Malik	1999	
Maggie Delakian	Jane Brucker	1986	
Neil Delaney	Steven Flynn	1988-89	
Spike Delaney	Michael Gaston	1996	
Del Delgado	Paul Calderon	1998	
Maria "Abuelita" Delgado	Míriam Colón	1996–97	
Roseanne Delgado	Erika Page	1998–2001	
Téa Delgado	Florencia Lozano	1997–2000, 2002, 2008–13	
Tomás Delgado	Ted King	2011–12	
Madame Delphina	Lea DeLaria	1999, 2008–09, 2011	
DuAnn Demerest	Lois Smith	1990	
DuAnn Demerest	Avril Gentles	1990–91	
LeeAnn Demerest	Yasmine Bleeth	1991–93	
Carlos Demitri	Kabir Bedi	1986	
Mari Lynn Dennison	Tammy Amerson	1986–89	
Tom Dennison	Lee Patterson	1986–88	
Decker Denton	Thomas G. Waites	2006	
Aristotle Descamedes	Steven Hill	1984–85	
Olivia DeWitt	Bridget White	1996–97	
Lolly Devore	Marilyn Michaels	1988	
Echo DiSavoy	Kim Zimmer	1983, 2010–11	
Renée Divine Buchanan	Phyllis Newman	1987-88	
Renée Divine Buchanan	Patricia Elliott	1988-2011	
Renée Divine Buchanan	Loyita Chapel	2008 (1968 storyline)	
Agnes Dixon	Agnes Nixon	2008	
Elaine Dixon	Rose Alaio	1987	
Billy Douglas	Ryan Phillippe	1992–93	
John Douglas	Donald Madden	1974–75	
Virginia Douglas	Susan Pellegrino	1992-93, 1994, 1995	
Walter Douglas	Jonathan Hogan	1992–93	
Johnny Drummond	Wayne Massey	1980–84	
Dusky	Jessie Malakouti	2013	
Emily du Maura	Arija Bareikis	1996	
Artie Duncan	John Cullum	1969	
Elliot Durbin	Stephen Macht	1996	

== E ==
Character	Actor(s)	Duration	Ref.
Doug Eber	Craig Wasson	1991	
Jane Eber	Catherine Ann Christiansen	1991	
Tom Edwards	Joseph Gallison	1969–71	
Greg Ellis	Robert Sedgwick	1990	
Laura Jean Ellis	Neith Hunter	1990–91	
Aaron Emmentaler	Byron Jennings	1996	
Destiny Evans	Shenell Edmonds	2009–12	
Destiny Evans	Laura Harrier	2013	
Greg Evans	Terrell Tilford	2009–10	
Phylicia Evans	Tonye Patano	2009–12	
Richard Evans	Frankie Faison	2009–12	
Shaun Evans	Sean Ringgold	2006–13	

== F ==
Character	Actor(s)	Duration	Ref.
Drake Faraday	Leigh McCloskey	2000	
Delbert Fina	Lea DeLaria	2008, 2011	
Ben Farmer	Rod Browning	1974–75	
Nick Fiore	Tony Finn	1997	
Barbara Fish	Lisa Evans	2009	
George Fish	J. Tucker Smith	2009	
Oliver Fish	Scott Evans	2008–10	
Judge Barbara Fitzwater	Novella Nelson	1993–2004	
Ellen Foley	Linda Cook	2005–06	
Ginger Foley	Shannon McGinnis	2005	
Deanna Forbes	Nafessa Williams	2011	
Eddie Ford	John Wesley Shipp	2010–12	
James Ford	Nic Robuck	2010–12	
Robert Ford	David A. Gregory	2009–12	
Judge Leeroy Fortier	Daniel Hugh Kelly	2006	
Jamie Franko	Riff Raff	2013	
Hattie Fredericks	Clarice Blackburn	1973–74	
Winslow Freeman	Patrick Breen	1996–97	

== G ==
Character	Actor(s)	Duration	Ref.
Hank Gannon	Nathan Purdee	1992–2003, 2009	
Janine Gannon	Kim Staunton	1997 (flashback)	
Rachel Gannon	Ellen Bethea	1992–95, 2000–02, 2005	
Rachel Gannon	Mari Morrow	1995–96	
Rachel Gannon	Sandra P. Grant	1996–98	
Rachel Gannon	Daphnée Duplaix Samuel	2009–10	
R.J. Gannon	Timothy D. Stickney	1994–2009	
Rick Gardner	Richard Grieco	1986–87	
Rafe Garretson	Ken Meeker	1980–91	
Sammi Garretson	Danielle Harris	1985–87	
Beth Garvey	Dorie Barton	1993–94	
Jack Gibson	James Wlcek	1989	
Doc Gilmore	Mario Van Peebles	1982–83	
Rita Gilmore	Camilla Enders	1996	
Billie Giordano	Lisa Peluso	1987–88	
Stacie Giordano	Bonnie Burroughs	1987–88	
Giulietta	Fabiana Udenio	1985–86	
Emilio Gonzales	Yancey Arias	1994–97	
Carrie Gordon	Caroline Lagerfelt	1989	
Danton Gordon	Brian Davies	1989	
Fran Craig Gordon	Barbara Britton	1979–80	
Fran Craig Gordon	Willi Burke	1979	
Megan Gordon Harrison	Jessica Tuck	1988–93, 1999, 2004, 2012	
Mick Gordon	James McDonnell	1979–80	
Roger Gordon	Larry Pine	1988–91	
Roger Gordon	Lawrence Toffler	1988-89 (Flashbacks)	
Sarah Gordon	Jensen Buchanan	1987–90	
Sarah Gordon	Grace Phillips	1991–92	
Arthur Gorman	Fritz Weaver	1988	
Barbara Graham	Sonia Satra	1998–99	
Congressman Richard Graham	Tim Ahern	1998	
Alicia Grande	Marcia McCabe	1989	
Michael Grande	Dennis Parlato	1988–90	
Wes Granger	Justin Paul Kahn	2008–09	
Carla Gray	Ellen Holly	1968–81, 1983–85	
Sadie Gray	Lillian Hayman	1968–86	
Sadie Gray	Esther Rolle	1970–71 (temporary)	
Madison Greene	Mary Ellen Stuart	1996	
Tommy Gregory	Christopher Coucill	1997	
Helen Guthrie	Ann Flood	1991	
Hunter Guthrie	Leonard Stabb	1990–91	

== H ==
Character	Actor(s)	Duration	Ref.
Bulge Hackman	Burke Moses	1992–94	
Ted Hale	Terry Logan	1968	
Ed Hall	Al Freeman Jr.	1972–88, 2000	
Ed Hall	David Pendleton	1975	
Jared Hall	Herve Clermont	2000	
Josh Hall	Laurence Fishburne	1973–76	
Josh Hall	Todd Davis	1977	
Josh Hall	Guy Davis	1985–86	
Sondra Hall	Olivia Birkelund	1991	
Lee Halpern	Janet Zarish	1987–88, 2008–09	
Nora Hanen Buchanan	Hillary B. Smith	1992–2013	
Nora Hanen Buchanan	Felicity LaFortune	2000 (temporary)	
Selma Hanen	Viola Harris	1993	
Selma Hanen	Joan Copeland	1995	
Susannah Hanen	Maureen Anderman	1995–96	
Kirk Harmon	Randolph Mantooth	2007	
Paula Harmon	Rebecca Brooksher	2007	
Tate Harmon	Chris Beetem	2007	
Brian Harris	Kevin McClatchy	1999	
Andrea Harrison	Bronwen Booth	1989–91	
Andrea Harrison	Wendee Pratt	1994–97	
Jake Harrison	Joe Lando	1990–92	
Kendall Hart	Alicia Minshew	2004–05	
Stephen Haver	Matthew Ashford	2003–04	
Ian Hayden	Craig Sheffer	1982	
Dorothy Hayes	Elisabeth Röhm	1997–98	
Mel Hayes	Stephen Markle	1997–99, 2008, 2010	
Neil Hayes	Dick Latessa	1997	
Emily Haynes	Kellie Waymire	1995	
Heather	Sarah Hyland	2007	
Alice Henson	Erin O'Brien	1994	
Carlo Hesser	Thom Christopher	1990–92, 1996–97, 1998, 2005, 2008	
Charlotte Hesser	Audrey Landers	1990–91	
Johnny Dee Hesser	Anthony Crivello	1990–91	
Stephanie Hobart	Christaan Mills	1991	
Stephanie Hobart	Robyn Griggs	1991–92	
Esther Hoffman	Gloria Cromwell	1999	
Prince Raymond Hohenstein	Robert Westenberg	1989–90	
Prince Roland Hohenstein	Joseph Kalinski	1989–90	
Al Holden	Kirk and Robert Raisch	1988–90	
Al Holden	Ryan and Sean Buckley	1990–91	
Al Holden	Evan Bonifant	1991–93	
Al Holden	Michael Roman	1993–94	
Al Holden	Eddie Karr	1994	
Al Holden	Jason Alexander Fischer	1994–97	
Al Holden	Michael Tipps	2001	
Al Holden	Nathaniel Marston	2001–04	
Max Holden	James DePaiva	1987–90, 1991–2003, 2007	
Max Holden	Nicholas Walker	1990–91	
Steve Holden	Russ Anderson	1987–88	
Angela Holliday	Susan Diol	1993–94	
Ina Hopkins	Sally Gracie	1978–84	
Ben Howard	Albert Hall	1973	
Jerry Lee Howell	Lou Sumrall	2003	
Bruce Hunter	Ryan Cooper	2013	
Adele Huddleston	Lori March	1977–79	
Greg Huddleston	Paul Joynt	1977–79	
Talbot Huddleston	Byron Sanders	1977–78	
Hugh Hughes	Josh Casaubon	2005–06	

== J ==
Character	Actor(s)	Duration	Ref.
Tracy James	Kristen Allen	1985–87	
Peter Janssen	Jeff Pomerantz	1976–79, 1987	
Peter Janssen	Robert Burton	1980	
Peter Janssen	Denny Albee	1980–82	
Britney Jennings	Katrina Bowden	2006	
Britney Jennings	Portia Reiners	2006–07	
Detective Calvin Johnson	David Leary		
Judd Benson	G Rockett Phillips	1978-1979	
Jeannie Johnson	Constance Forslund	1986	
Jeannie Johnson	Alexandra Neil		
Shelly Johnson	Suzanne Leuffen	1983	
Michael Jonas	Christopher Durham	1992	
Dallas Jones	Loyita Chapel	1999, 2005, 2008	
Vincent Jones	Tobias Truvillion	2006–08	
Leah Joplin	Maureen Mueller	2008, 2010	
Schuyler Joplin	Scott Clifton	2009–10	

== K ==
Character	Actor(s)	Duration	Ref.
Katrina Karr	Nancy Snyder	1978–83	
Kristine Karr	Regan McManus	1981–83	
Dirk Keller	Walter Gotell	1986	
Brian Kendall	Steve Austin	1976–78	
Paul Kendall	Tom Fuccello	1977–79	
Thomas Kenneally	Malachy McCourt	1995–97	
Irwin Keyser	Jerry Orbach	1980–81	
Virginia Keyser	Deanna Lund	1980–81	
Jeffrey King	Corbin Bleu	2013	
Mimi King	Kristen Meadows	1979–82, 1985–86	
Jordan Kingsley	Kevin Mambo	2003–04	
Faith Kipling	Maty Linda Rapeleye	1979–80	
Ivan Kipling	Jack Betts	1979–82, 1985–86	
Conrad Klein	Evan Handler	1996	
Douglas Kline	Mark LaMura	2007	
Susan Klips	Lisa Datz	2002	
Judson Kreps	Arnola Mazer	1984	

== L ==
Character	Actor(s)	Duration	Ref.
Donald LaMarr	Jared Martin	1987–88	
Adrian LaRue	John Bedford Lloyd	1986	
Roger Landover	Stephen Bolster	1979	
Coco Lane	Nancy Sorel	1988	
Kate Lane	Alice Callahan	2013	
Gilbert Lange	John Fiedler	1987–88	
Miles Laurence	David Chisum	2007–08	
Mitch Laurence	Roscoe Born	1985–87, 2002–03, 2009–10, 2012	
Walker "Flynn" Laurence	Trevor St. John	2003	
Bridget Leander	Madeleine Sherwood	1980	
Lord Henry Leighton	Donal Donnelly	1988	
Joanna Leighton	Roma Downey	1988	
Edwina Lewis	Margaret Klenck	1978–84	
Kyle Lewis	Brett Claywell	2009–10	
Rebecca Lewis	Reiko Aylesworth	1993–94	
Rebecca Lewis	Jessica Kaye	2009	
Wayman Link	James Riordan	1990	
Lucky Lippman	Brian Tarantina	1990–91	
Stella Lipschitz	Sylvia Miles	2002–03	
Prentice Little	Oni Faida Lampley	1997	
Glenda Livingstone	Kelly McGillis	1984	
Glenda Livingstone	Cynthia Dozer	1984	
Cindy London	Cynthia Vance	1986–88	
Cindy London	Kathryn Meisle	1988	
Patrick London	Stephen Meadows	1987–88	
Patrick London	Robert S. Woods	1988	
Gwendolyn Lord Abbott	Joan Copeland	1978–79	
Meredith Lord	Trish Van Devere	1968	
Meredith Lord	Lynn Benesch	1969–73, 1987 (Heaven storyline)	
Powell Lord III	Sean Moynihan	1993–94, 2009	
Tina Lord	Andrea Evans	1978–81, 1985–90, 2008, 2011	
Tina Lord	Kelli Maroney	1984	
Tina Lord	Marsha Clark	1984–85	
Tina Lord	Nancy Frangione	1985 (temporary)	
Tina Lord	Karen Witter	1990–94	
Tina Lord	Krista Tesreau	1994–97	
Tony Lord	George Reinholt	1975–77	
Tony Lord	Philip MacHale	1977–79, 1987 (Heaven storyline)	
Tony Lord	Chip Lucia	1981–83	
Victor Lord, Jr.	Trevor St. John	2003–13	
Victor Lord, Jr.	Roger Howarth	2011 (flashbacks)	
Victor Lord	Ernest Graves	1968–74	
Victor Lord	Shepperd Strudwick	1974–76	
Victor Lord	Tom O'Rourke	1985 (flashbacks)	
Victor Lord	Les Tremayne	1987 (Heaven storyline)	
Victor Lord	Fritz Weaver	1988-1989 (flashbacks)	
Victor Lord	Bill Moor	1994–95 (flashbacks)	
Victor Lord	William Stone Mahoney	2003–04	
Victoria Lord	Gillian Spencer	1968–70	
Victoria Lord	Joanne Dorian	1970–71	
Victoria Lord	Erika Slezak	1971–2013	
Victoria Lord	Christine Jones	1980–81, 1983 (temporary)	
Victoria Lord	Judith Barcroft	1987 (temporary)	
Victoria Lord	Amanda Davies (Note: Amanda Davies is the daughter of Erika Slezak (Victoria Lord).)	2003 (flashbacks)	
Blanchard Lovelace	John Wesley Shipp	1989	
Brody Lovett	Mark Lawson	2008–12	
Nadine Lovett	Kate Miller	2008–09, 2011	
Alex Lowndes	Roger Hill	1983–84	

== M ==
Character	Actor(s)	Duration	Ref.
Colin MacIver	Ty Treadway	2000–01, 2008	
Emily MacIver	Amber Ryan	2002–03	
Melanie MacIver	Darlene Vogel	2000–01	
Troy MacIver	Ty Treadway	2001–04, 2012	
Henry Mackler	Jonathan Groff	2007	
Michael Mahoney	Boris McGiver	1997	
Anthony Makana	Nicolas Coster	1983–84	
Leigh Malone	Lisby Larson	2000	
Danielle Manning	Kelley Missal	2009–13	
Hope Manning-Thornhart	Tess, Madeline & Molly Sullivan	2008–12	
Irene Manning	Kate McKeown	1978, 1987 (Heaven storyline)	
Irene Manning	Andrea Evans	1985 (flashbacks)	
Irene Manning	Diana Lamar	1994–95 (flashbacks)	
Irene Manning	Barbara Rhoades	2011	
Jack Manning	Ryan and Riley Cramer	2001–03	
Jack Manning	Ty Simpkins	2003	
Jack Manning	Christian Thomas Ashdale	2003–04	
Jack Manning	Jack Boscoe	2005–06	
Jack Manning	Thomas Christian Justusson	2006–07	
Jack Manning	Carmen LoPorto	2007–10	
Jack Manning	Andrew Trischitta	2011–13	
Peter Manning	Nick Wyman	1993, 1994	
Sam Manning	Zachary and Daniel Frisch	2006–07	
Sam Manning	Jacob and Luke Clodfelter	2007–10	
Sam Manning	Patrick J. Gibbons	2010–13	
Starr Manning	Ariella and Natalie Jamnik	1996–98	
Starr Manning	Meghan Rayder	1998	
Starr Manning	Kristen Alderson	1998–2012	
Todd Manning	Roger Howarth	1992–98, 2000–03, 2011–13	
Todd Manning	Trevor St. John	2003–11	
Lt. Nick Manzo	Matt Servitto	1993–95	
Briana Marland	Kaitlyn Bausch	2013	
Karen Martin	Niki Flacks	1968–70	
Tad Martin	Michael E. Knight	1996, 2003	
Ray Martino	Scott Cohen	1994	
Alex Masters	Randolph Mantooth	1997	(Note: Alex Masters (portrayed by Randolph Mantooth) appeared as a crossover character from The City.)
Ionia Masters	Kate Hodge	2011	
Matt McAllister	Vance Jefferis	1974–77, 1979–1980	
Eve McBain	Lisa Banes	2004	
Eve McBain	Lisby Larson	2006	
John McBain	Michael Easton	2003–12	
Liam McBain	Finn Robbins	2013	
Michael McBain	R. Brandon Johnson	2003–04	
Michael McBain	Nathaniel Marston	2004–07	
Michael McBain	Robert Harte	2007 (temporary)	
Michael McBain	Chris Stack	2007–09, 2011	
Shannon McBain	Danneel Harris	2004	
Thomas McBain	Malachy Cleary	2005–07	
Michelle McCall	Amber Skye Noyes	2013	
Lana McClain	Jacklyn Zeman	1976–77	
Maxie McDermott	Christine Ebersole	1983–84	
Molly McDermott	Dody Goodman	1984	
Warden McFadden	Beeson Carroll	1986	
Brenda McGillis	Brenda Brock	1988–91	
Buddy McGillis	Braden Danner	1988	
May McGillis	Brenda Brock	1988 (Old West storyline)	
Tyler McGillis	Jeff Bankert	1989–90	
Geoffrey McGrath	Don Fischer	1987–89	
Kate McKee	Kathy Larson	1984	
Dean McKenzie	Kristine Sutherland	2010–11	
Liz McNamara	Margaret Hall	1991–96	
Jackie McNaughton	Doc Daugherty	2002, 2005, 2008–09	
Carmen Medina	Graciela LeCube	1986–87	
Dante Medina	Henry Darrow	1987	
Debra Medina	Lucinda Fisher	1989–90	
Gabrielle Medina	Fiona Hutchison	1987–91, 2001–04, 2012	
Julia Medina	Linda Thorson	1989–92	
Fernando Mercedes	Nelson Vazquez	1999	
Wendi Mercury	Shequida	1997-98	
Nick Messina	William G. Bozarth	2004–05	
Julia Michaels	Brooke Alexander	2001	
Mickey	Angel David	1995	
Buck Miller	Christopher Murney	1994, 2001	
Missy Miller	Veanne Cox	2001	
Paige Miller	Kimberlin Brown	2004–05	
Paige Miller	Cady Huffman	2005–06	
Paige Miller	Alexandra Neil	2006–07	
Joel Miranda	Jack Gilpen	2002	
Hallie Mitchell	Oni Faida Lampley	1994	
Rick Mitchell	Joe Fiske	1992–93	
Clay Monroe	Judson Scott	1985	
Hugo Monroe	John Horton	1999	
Frank Montagne	Jeff Gendelman	1987	
Sandra Montagne	Judith Chapman	1987	
Lola Montez	Camila Banus	2008–09	
Ray Montez	A Martinez	2008–09	
Vanessa Montez	Jacqueline Hendy	2008–09	
Bianca Montgomery	Eden Riegel	2004–05	
Dylan Moody	Christopher Douglas	1994–97	
Luna Moody	Susan Batten	1991–96, 2002–04, 2012	
Ty Moody	Casper Van Dien	1993–94	
Lt. Bill Moore	John Amos	1986	
Capt. Andy Moore	Daryl Roach	1987	
Gigi Morasco	Farah Fath	2007–12	
Shane Morasco	Austin Williams	2007–12	
Stacy Morasco	Crystal Hunt	2009–10, 2012	
Stacy Morasco	Farah Fath	2011	
Baz Moreau	Barret Helms	2011	
Buzz Morgan	Graham Beckel	1987	
Giles Morgan	Robert Gentry	1983	
Gloria Mundy	Anna Garduno	1990	
Helen Murdock	Marie Masters	1982	

== N ==
Character	Actor(s)	Duration	Ref.
Nikki	Jenni "JWoww" Farley	2013	
Kerry Nichols	Allan Dean Moore	1990–91	
Troy Nichols	Terry Alexander	1990–92	
Kate Nolan	Peggy Wood	1969	
Grant Noone	Anthony DeSando	1996	

== O ==
Character	Actor(s)	Duration	Ref.
Travis O'Connell	Connor Paolo	2004	
Hannah O'Connor	Meghann Fahy	2010, 2012	
Alex Olanov	Tonja Walker Davidson	1990–97, 2001–02, 2007, 2009, 2011	
Connie O'Neill	Elizabeth Keifer	1984–85, 1988	
Connie O'Neill	Terry Donahoe	1985–86	
Didi O'Neill	Barbara Treutelaar	1984–88	
Harry O'Neill	Arlen Dean Snyder	1984	
Harry O'Neill	Frank Converse	1984–85	
Joy O'Neill	Kristen Vigard	1984–85	
Joy O'Neill	Julie Ann Johnson	1985–86	
Pete O'Neill	James O'Sullivan	1985–87	
Noelle Ortiz Stubbs	January LaVoy	2007–09, 2011	
Ted Osbourne	Mike Jerome	2006	

== P ==
Character	Actor(s)	Duration	Ref.
Diego Padilla	Esteban Benito	2013	
Millee Parks	Millee Taggart	1969–70	
Neela Patel	Teresa Patel	2011–12	
Rama Patel	Shenaz Treasury	2011–13	
Vimal Patel	Nick Choksi	2010–13	
Freddie Pellegrino	Greg Haberny	1999	
Sophia Pellegrino	Charissa Chamorro	1999–2001	
Javier Perez	Rene Lavan	1995–97	
Allison Perkins	Barbara Garrick	1986–87, 2001–03, 2008, 2010, 2012–13	
Ruth Perkins	Eileen Heckart	1986	
Warden Perkins	Richard Hamilton	1986	
Carl Peterson	Ron Raines	2013	
Georgie Phillips	Jennifer Bransford	1997–98	
Laurie Phillips	Sharon Washington	1996	
Steve Piermont	Richard K. Weber	1981	
Steve Piermont	Robert Desiderio	1982–83	
Marcus Polk	Donald Moffat	1968	
Marcus Polk	Norman Rose	1969–74	
Marcus Polk	James Douglas	1985–87	
Fred Porter	David Purdham	1991–92	
Lisa Porter	Danielle DuClos	1990–91	
Rick Powers	Austin Peck	2011–12	
Hudson Prescott	Tarik Lowe	2004–05	
Ben Price	Charles Malik Whitfield	1993–94	
Ben Price	Peter Parros	1994–95	
Brody Price	Jon Hensley	1985	
Rika Price	Vanita Harbour	1990–91	
Sheila Price Gannon	Valarie Pettiford	1990–94	
Sheila Price Gannon	Stephanie E. Williams	1994–96	
Jacara Principal	Marva Hicks	1997–98	
Deborah Rhinehart Pruitt	Susan Batten	1992	
Suede Pruitt	David Ledingham	1992–94	

== R ==
Character	Actor(s)	Duration	Ref.
Blanche Ralston	Margaret Gwenver	1981–83	
Delilah Ralston	Shelly Burch	1982–89, 2001	
Drew Ralston	Matthew Ashford	1982–83	
Euphemia Ralston	Grayson Hall	1982–83	
Twyla Ralston	Rebecca Schull	1982–83	
Yancy Ralston	William Andrews	1981	
Lee Ramsey	Hunt Block	2007–08	
Eugenia Randolph Lord	Lori March	1987 (Heaven storyline)	
Eugenia Randolph Lord	Natacha Roi	1994–95	
Jen Rappaport	Jessica Morris	2001–05, 2008	
Lindsay Rappaport	Catherine Hickland	1998–2009, 2012	
Sam Rappaport	Kale Browne	1998–2001	
Sam Rappaport	Laurence Lau	2001–03	
Will Rappaport	Jason-Shane Scott	1998–2001, 2003, 2005, 2007	
Ross Rayburn	Shawn Christian	2002	
Ross Rayburn	Michael Lowry	2009–10	
Ross Rayburn	Billy Warlock	2010	
Keyshawn "Keys" Reddick	Mario D'Leon	2008	
Laura Reed	Lisa Gay Hamilton	1996	
David Renaldi	Michael Zaslow	1983–86, 1998	
David Renaldi	Vincent Baggetta	1986 (temporary)	
Claudia Reston	Kerry Butler	2006–07	
George Reston	Michael Lee Patterson	2005–06	
Keri Reynolds	Sherri Saum	2001–03	
Liz Reynolds	Barbara Niven	2002–03	
Marcus Rhinehart	Claude Akins	1992	
Kara Richardson	Linda Emond	1997	
Eileen Riley Siegel	Patricia Roe	1968–72	
Eileen Riley Siegel	Alice Hirson	1972–76	
Joe Riley	Lee Patterson	1968–70, 1972–79, 1987 (Heaven storyline)	
Aurelia Rivera	Ada Maris	2009–10	
Ernesto Rivera	David Piñon	2009–10	
Markko Rivera	Jason Tam	2007–12	
Mike Rivers	Clark Johnson	1986	
Mike Rivers	Eriq LaSalle	1986	
Al Roberts	Jesse Vint	1986–87	
C.J. Roberts	Anthony and Victor DeBiase	1988	
C.J. Roberts	Keith and Gary Meredith	1990–91	
C.J. Roberts	Ryan Murphy	1991	
C.J. Roberts	Tyler Noyes	1992–94	
Cord Roberts	John Loprieno	1986–97, 2004, 2007–08, 2011	
Maria Roberts	BarBara Luna	1986–88	
Maria Roberts	Melissa Archer	2008 (1968 storyline)	
Sarah Roberts	Alexa and Zoe Fisher	1991	
Sarah Roberts	Courtney Chase	1993–94	
Sarah Roberts	Hayden Panettiere	1994–97	
Sarah Roberts	Shanelle Workman	2003–04	
Sarah Roberts	Justis Bolding	2007–09	
Vince Robeson	Aloysius Gigl	1986	
Luis Rodriguez	Rudy Mela	1995–96	
Cain Rogan	Christopher Cousins	1991–94, 2008	
Jinx Rollins	Elizabeth Burrelle	1984–85	
Zach Rosen	Josh Phillip Weinstein	1993–95, 2009	
Sonya Roskova Cramer	Marian Seldes	1998	
Roxy	Susan Scannell	1986	
John Rupert	William Hickey	1984	
Jon Russell	John Martin	1986–89, 1991–92	
Gina Russo	Rebecca Boyd	2001	
Gina Russo	Lisa Peluso	2001	

== S ==
Character	Actor(s)	Duration	Ref.
Talia Sahid	BethAnn Bonner	2006–09	
Kin Saito	Karen Tsen Lee	2005	
Inez Salinger	Jessica Leccia	2010–11	
Nate Salinger	Lenny Platt	2010–12	
Marcello Salta	Stephen Schnetzer	1980–82	
Charles Sanders Jr.	Peter Brown	1986–87	
Judith Sanders	Louise Sorel	1986–87	
Elizabeth Sanders	Lois Kibbee	1986–89	
Jamie Sanders	Mark Philpot	1986–89	
Kate Sanders	Marcia Cross	1986–87	
Isabella Santi	Saundra Santiago	2004	
Tico Santi	Javier Morga	2004	
Kiki Saybrooke	Delphi Harrington	1994	
Marty Saybrooke	Susan Haskell	1992–97, 2004–05, 2008–11	
Marty Saybrooke	Christina Chambers	2006–07	
Keith Schaeffer	Keith Coulouris	2001	
Lucinda Schenk	Arlene Dahl	1981–84	
Jack Scott	Arthur Burghardt	1978–80	
Steve Piermont	Richard Ely	1981	
Pamela Shepherd	Kathleen Divine	1978	
Dave Siegel	Allan Miller	1968–72	
Julie Siegel	Lee Warrick	1969–74	
Julie Siegel	Leonie Norton	1974–76	
Tim Siegel	William Fowler	1969	
Tim Siegel	William Cox	1970–71	
Tim Siegel	Tom Berenger	1975–76	
Jack Simmons	Michael Callan	1985–87	
Bert Skelly	Wayne Jones	1969	
Bert Skelly	Herb Davis	1969–72	
Spring Skye	Sharon Schlarth	1989–90	
Charlie Smith	Antony Ponzini	1987	
Mark Solomon	Matt Cavenaugh	2004–05	
Linda Soto	Andrea Navedo	1995–97	
Matron Spitz	Jennifer Leak	1986	
Ellen Spivak	Kathleen Mahoney-Bennett	1995	
Jared St. James	W.T. Martin	1990	
Osgood Star	Roderick Cook	1983	
Dean Stella	Thomas Sminkey	1984, 1987, 1988	
Dean Stella	Bryan Cranston	1985	
Cally Stevenson	Jodi Knotts	1988–89	
Randy Stone	Richard Burgi	1988	
Randy Stone	Jonathan Penner	1988	
Randy Stone	Carl Mueller	1989	
Charlotte Stonecliff	Phyllis Somerville	1997	
Pamela Stuart	Christine Jones	1986–88, 2001, 2008–09	
Jeremiah Stubbs	John Rue	2008	
Moe Stubbs	John Rue	2007–09, 2011	
Jo Sullivan	Marnie Schulenburg	2013	
Brent Sutton	David Lee Smith	1994	
John Sykes	John Bolger	1998–2001, 2004	

== T ==
Character	Actor(s)	Duration	Ref.
Jancie Talbert	Catherine Dent	1997	
Gus Thompson	Dan Lauria	1984	
Cole Thornhart	Brandon Buddy	2006–10	
Cole Thornhart	Van Hughes	2012	
Patrick Thornhart	Thorsten Kaye	1995–97	
Tico	Sean Patrick Thomas	1995	
Tillie	Heather MacRae	2002–03	
Mark Toland	Tommy Lee Jones	1971–75	
Sonia Toledo	Lisa Lo Cicero	2004	
Dean Trayger	Ward Horton	2013	
Eli Trayger	Geoffrey Wigdor	1997–98	
Renee Traynor	Sabina Lee Moore	1981	
Spencer Truman	Paul Satterfield	2005–07	
Spencer Truman	Austin Williams	2008 (1968 storyline)	
Tripp Tucker	Rod Brogan	1991	

== V ==
Character	Actor(s)	Duration	Ref.
Father Tony Vallone	John Viscardi	1990–91	
Sam Vance	Kathleen McNenny	1994–95	
Arthur Vandenburg	Patrick Horgan	1994–96	
Brent Van Buren	Jack Gwaltney	1988	
Debra Van Druden	Nancy Barrett	1982	
Vincent Van Dyke	Edmund Genest	2000	
Lorna Van Skyver	Virginia Williams	1995–96	
Eva Vasquez	Judith McConnell	1983	
George Vasquez	Michael O'Hare	1988	
Eleanor Vaughn	Jennifer Rae Beck	2004	
Antonio Vega	Kamar de los Reyes	1995–98, 2000–09	
Antonio Vega	Robert Montano	2007 (temporary)	
Carlotta Vega	Patricia Mauceri	1995–2009	
Carlotta Vega	Saundra Santiago	2009–11	
Cristian Vega	Yorlin Madera	1995–98	
Cristian Vega	David Fumero	1998–2011	
Jamie Vega	Darryn and Leah Thompson	2003–05	
Jamie Vega	Saoirse Scott	2005–09	
Maggie Vega	Yvette Lawrence	1992–93	
Eddie Velasquez	Jose Soto	1995–96	
Wilton Venere	Roderick Cook	1983	
Brad Vernon	Jameson Parker	1976–78	
Brad Vernon	Steve Fletcher	1978–87	
Mary Vernon	Regan McManus	1982–83	
Naomi Vernon	Teri Keane	1976–77	
Samantha Vernon Garretson	Julia Montgomery	1976–81, 1987 (Heaven storyline)	
Samantha Vernon Garretson	Susan Keith	1979 (temporary)	
Samantha Vernon Garretson	Dorian Lopinto	1981–84	
Will Vernon	Farley Granger	1976–77	
Will Vernon	Bernie McInerney	1977	
Will Vernon	Anthony George	1977–84	
David Vickers Buchanan	Tuc Watkins	1994–96, 2001–13	

== W ==
Character	Actor(s)	Duration	Ref.
Marcy Wade	Francesca James	1970–72	
Charlie Walsh	Paul O' Brien	2004–06	
Eric Walsh	Bill Dawes	2004–06	
Marcie Walsh McBain	Kathy Brier	2002–09, 2011	
Ron Walsh	Timothy Adams	2003–07	
Simon Warfield	Tim Hart	1983–84	
Gary Warren	Ron Palillo	1994	
Jason Webb	Mark Brettschneider	1991–94	
Wanda Webb Wolek	Marilyn Chris	1972–76, 1980–94	
Wanda Webb Wolek	Lee Lawson	1977–79	
Irma Weber	Scotty Bloch	1999	
Jacob Weber	Sam Gray	1999	
Aubrey Wentworth	Terri Conn	2010–11	
Cutter Wentworth	Josh Kelly	2010–11, 2013	
Lisa West	Christine Toy Johnson	1998–2001	
Bruno Weston	Humbert Allen Astredo	1979	
Julia Wheaton	Linda Thorson	1989–82	
Georgina Whitman	Ilene Kristen	1982	
Georgina Whitman	Nana Visitor	1982	
Clover Wilde	Pamela Shoemaker	1985–86	
Langston Wilde	Brittany Underwood	2006–11, 2012	
Beverly Wilkes	Carol Potter	1979	
Beverly Wilkes	Nancy Lee Grahn	1980–82	
Clay Williamson	Obba Babatunde	2005	
Evangeline Williamson	Renée Elise Goldsberry	2003–07	
Layla Williamson	Tika Sumpter	2005–11	
Lisa Williamson	Janet Hubert	2005, 2007, 2010	
Chuck Wilson	Jeremy Slate	1979–87	
Chuck Wilson	Peter Bartlett	2008 (1968 storyline)	
Chuck Wilson II	Brandon Johnson	2008 (1968 storyline)	
Chuck Wilson III	Brandon Johnson	2007–08	
Rachel Wilson	Nancy Barrett	1974	
Agrippina Wolcott	Ingrid Boulting	1986	
Anna Wolek	Doris Belack	1968–77	
Anna Wolek	Kathleen Maguire	1977–78	
Anna Wolek	Phyllis Behar	1978–82	
Daniel Wolek	Neail Holland	1974–76	
Daniel Wolek	Eddie Moran	1976–79	
Daniel Wolek	Timothy Owen Waldrip	1983, 1985	
Daniel Wolek	Steven Culp	1983–84	
Daniel Wolek	Ted Demers	1984	
Daniel Wolek	Joshua Cox	1986	
Daniel Wolek	Michael Palance	1989–91	
Jenny Wolek	Katherine Glass	1975–78	
Jenny Wolek	Brynn Thayer	1978–86	
Karen Wolek	Kathryn Breech	1976–77	
Karen Wolek	Julia Duffy	1977	
Karen Wolek	Judith Light	1977–83	
Larry Wolek	Paul Tully	1968	
Larry Wolek	Jim Storm	1968–69	
Larry Wolek	Michael Storm	1969–2004	
Vince Wolek	Antony Ponzini	1968–75, 1987 (Heaven storyline)	
Vince Wolek	Jordan Charney	1975–77	
Vince Wolek	Michael Ingram	1977–81	
James "Woody" Woodward	Grant Goodeve	1985–86	
Courtney Wright	Phylicia Ayers-Allen	1983–84	
Ambrose Wyman	David Spielberg	1989	
Serena Wyman	Kelly Bishop	1989	

== Y ==
Character	Actor(s)	Duration	Ref.
Charlotte Young	Pamela Payton-Wright	1986	
Hannah Young	Anna Kathryn Holbrook	2007	
Aida York	Pamela Gien	1985	

== Z ==
Character	Actor(s)	Duration	Ref.
Zeus Zelenko	Rob Campbell	1997	
Murray Zittel	Henry Zittel	2010	

== See also ==
- One Life to Live characters (1968–79)
- One Life to Live characters (1980s)
- One Life to Live characters (1990s)
- One Life to Live characters (2000s)
- One Life to Live characters (2010s)
