= Jack Manning (One Life to Live) =

- One Life to Live character
- Andrew Trischitta as Jack Manning
- Portrayed by: Ryan and Riley Cramer (2001–2003); Christian Thomas Ashdale (2003–2004); Jack Boscoe (2005–2006); Thomas Christian Justusson (2006–2007); Carmen LoPorto (2007–2011); Andrew Trischitta (2011–2013)
- Duration: 2001–2013
- First appearance: October 11, 2001
- Last appearance: August 19, 2013
- Created by: Lorraine Broderick; Christopher Whitesell
- Introduced by: Gary Tomlin (2001); Jennifer Pepperman (2013)
- Carmen LoPorto as Jack Manning
In-universe information
- Other names: John Cramer Manning; Jeter Miller
- Occupation: Student; Editor; Executive assistant; Trustee
- Father: Todd Manning
- Mother: Blair Cramer
- Sisters: Starr Manning
- Half-brothers: Sam Manning (adoptive)
- Half-sisters: Danielle Manning
- Grandparents: Victor Lord; Irene Manning; Addie Cramer; Peter Manning (adoptive); Bitsy Jones Manning (adoptive)
- Aunts and uncles: Tony Lord; Victoria Lord; Meredith Lord; Tina Lord; Victor Lord, Jr.
- Nieces: Hope Manning-Thornhart
- First cousins: Megan Gordon; Brian Kendall; Daniel Wolek; Kevin Buchanan; Joey Buchanan; Jessica Buchanan; Natalie Buchanan; Sarah Roberts; C. J. Roberts; Sam Manning; Adriana Cramer; Paul Cramer; Zane Buchanan; Kelly Cramer; Cassie Callison; Langston Wilde (adoptive)

Jack Manning is a fictional character from the American soap opera One Life to Live. He is the only son of supercouple Todd Manning and Blair Cramer.

== Casting ==
The role of Jack Manning was depicted by baby child actors Ryan and Riley Cramer, who were alternately in the roles from October 11, 2001, through 2003. Jack was then played as in early childhood by Christian Thomas Ashdale from 2003 through 2004, Jack Boscoe from January 2005 through October 2006, and by Thomas Christian Justusson from December 2006 through August 2007. Carmen LoPorto stepped into the role in preadolescence, portraying Jack regularly in a recurring capacity from September 3, 2007, through January 3, 2011, revising the character's birth year to 1997.

In February 2011, the character was aged to a teenager and birth year ultimately changed to 1995 with Andrew Trischitta in the role, debuting on the serial in the February 22, 2011, episode. Trischitta was bumped up to contract in early May 2011, making the character a featured lead role for the first time on the series. Trischitta remained on the show through the original television finale episode aired January 12, 2012, and reprised the role when new daily episodes of OLTL debuted on Hulu, iTunes, and FX Canada via The Online Network April 29, 2013.

== Storylines ==
=== 2001–11 ===
In 2001, a pregnant Blair (Kassie DePaiva) goes to San Blas, Nayarit, Mexico intending to give birth to who she believes is the son of Max Holden (James DePaiva). Todd (Roger Howarth) follows an unsuspecting Blair, eventually making her believe the baby boy died soon after his birth on October 10, 2001. Todd goes to the airport and gives the baby to a pair of nuns. Witnessing this, David Vickers (Tuc Watkins) gets the child back and brings him to where Todd and Blair are staying. Todd pays David a hefty sum to get rid of the baby. David gives the child to a rich Texas couple, the Millers. Todd discovers the boy is indeed his son and forces David to reveal his location. Todd gets him back, and he, along with Blair and Starr (Kristen Alderson), name the baby Jack. David blackmails Todd, threatening to tell Blair everything. Todd turns the tables on him. Blair eventually finds out after Jack is diagnosed with aplastic anemia, the same illness Starr had a few years prior when she discovered that Alex Olanov (Tonja Walker) also donated her bone marrow to save his life. Margaret Cochran (Tari Signor), obsessed with Todd (Trevor St. John), kidnaps young Jack in 2004. He is later returned. Aged to a preteen in 2007, Jack becomes a regular recurring role who behaves as mischievously as his older sister Starr before him, learning her manipulative ways, as well as obnoxious and disrespectful behavior from his father.

=== 2011–13 ===
Jack first appears as a self-absorbed teenager in February 2011 and begins bullying Shane Morasco (Austin Williams). Jack makes it his mission to humiliate Shane, going as far as taunting him on fictional social networking website called "MyFace", believing his familial wealth and power would protect him.

The bullying drives Shane to attempt suicide by throwing himself off the roof of Llanview High School. Jack is soon confronted by Blair and Starr upon learning of the incident from Shane's mom, Gigi Morasco (Farah Fath), but he again feigns innocence of his actions.

In summer 2011, Jack creates a fictitious MyFace account as a girl to taunt Shane. When "she" invites Shane to a party, Gigi makes Shane leave and poses as him to gain information from Jack and "kick his butt". She goes to the place where Shane was slated to go. Jack and two of his stooges lock her in a room, thinking that was Shane. On the day of her wedding, Gigi is stuck in a basement with an old back-up power generator that is leaking carbon monoxide. Jack goes to the courthouse with legal stepmother Téa Delgado (Florencia Lozano) and is shocked to see Shane there. Shane and Jack have it out. Shane, his father Rex Balsom (John-Paul Lavoisier), and his adoptive grandmother Roxy Balsom (Ilene Kristen) realize Gigi is late to her wedding because of Jack. Jack pretends not to know what they are talking about.

After looking at the messages on Téa's laptop, Rex searches for Gigi and finds her unconscious in the basement of an abandoned former home of Jack's friend. Rex takes Gigi to the hospital and calls Roxy to tell her and Shane to be with him. Shane threatens to kill Jack if his mother was injured. While at the hospital, the doctor tells Rex they are too late. Téa takes Jack to see Todd (St. John) in jail, where she overhears him admit his culpability in Gigi's apparent death and tells him he could be tried as an adult. As police officers John McBain (Michael Easton) and Brody Lovett (Mark Lawson), Todd bribes Jack's friend to take the fall, angering Blair. In hopes of keeping him out of trouble, Todd appoints Jack as The Sun newspaper's executive assistant. While working, Jack is later attacked by someone with Todd's original face.

August 1, 2011, at the apex of a story arc which brought Llanview elite to The Palace Hotel for the David Vickers Buchanan (Tuc Watkins) disastrous premiere of Vickerman: The Movie, a man claiming to be "the real Todd" (Howarth) pleads to Starr and Jack to believe him. Jack sides with the "new" Todd (St. John), the only father he remembers, while Starr sides with the father she knew as a child (Howarth). Jack soon tells Starr "his dad" saved him from going to jail for Gigi's death and "only a father can do that". Later, when a DNA test concludes both men to be twins, and Jack's believed-to-be-dead paternal grandmother, Irene Manning (Barbara Rhoades) soon arrives in Llanview to tell the Lords she actually bore patriarch Victor Lord two twin sons, Todd (Howarth) and Victor, Jr. (St. John). A loyal Jack sides with Victor. October 7, 2011, Jack takes brief ownership of The Sun and writes a scathing cover story on his father Todd, who he suspects murdered his uncle and adoptive father Victor, Jr.

Concurrently, Shane confronts Jack at the cemetery near Victor, Jr.'s grave, accusing him of being Gigi's real murderer and shoots at him. Shane intentionally misses, instead knocking Jack unconscious with the gun and taking him to the hospital. Jack soon meets Neela Patel (Teresa Patel), with whom he has a brief romance. Angry at Todd reclaiming his life, Jack sets fire to The Sun offices, unaware Neela's brother and sister-in-law, Vimal (Nick Choksi) and Rama Patel (Shenaz Treasury) were both inside. Todd later finds out it was Jack who set the fire at The Sun, and blackmails him into a cordial relationship for silence and help finding a Christmas tree for the mansion of his great-aunt Dorian, La Boulaie. Sharing an intimate moment, Neela coaxes Jack into admitting his complicity in the death of Shane's mother Gigi and records their conversation for Shane, who brings the tape to the police. Jack is arrested for Gigi's death on Christmas Eve 2011, just as Jack was ready to accept Todd as his biological father.

Just before the New Year, Jack and Téa are surprised to discover Gigi is still alive and that the woman who died with Gigi's face was her jealous sister Stacy (Farah Fath/Crystal Hunt), who unknowingly had plastic surgery to appear exactly as her sister. Gigi confronts Jack about almost killing her but is stopped by Shane, who tells her it is not worth getting even with Jack since he was not really responsible for her "death". Murder charges against Jack are dropped with Stacy's death ruled accidental. Neela later apologizes to Jack for the recording and admits to him that he matched the description of the boy she dreamed of falling in love with. Neela bids Jack goodbye when she tells him that she believes that Jack was truly sorry for his actions. Jack is last seen saying goodbye to his sister Starr, who moves to Hollywood with Hope to pursue a music career.

With Starr and Todd having crossed over to General Hospital, Jack is mentioned several times. On the June 23 episode, Todd says to Sam Morgan (Kelly Monaco), who was briefly his secretary, to put his calls through to him if Starr calls or if Jack and his other sister, Dani (Kelley Missal) call, both of whom probably will not call due to him being found on not guilty for killing Victor. On the July 17 episode, Todd tells Carly Corinthos (Laura Wright) Jack is at ice hockey camp.

Jack is still at odds with Todd upon his reappearance in April 2013, soon rejoicing at the revelation that adoptive father Victor, Jr. is alive. Jack strongly rebuffs Todd's attempts at a relationship but is devastated when Victor leaves town soon after his reappearance. Curmudgeonly moody to family members save for Victor's immediate family, Jack reveals to his paternal aunt Viki (Erika Slezak) his conflicted feelings for both "fathers" and fear of following in the troubled legacy of Lord men.

While having coffee at the coffee shop one day before summer school, he is approached by a woman who lures him to her apartment by taking his laptop. Once there, they have sex twice, and Jack loses his virginity in the process. The woman introduces herself as Kate (Alice Callahan). Jack rushes off to school, saying he has to be somewhere. Upon arriving at school, he is shocked to find Kate is his teacher. After an awkward day at class, she asks him to stay back. Jack uncomfortably considers transferring classes, but they begin kissing, continuing their affair.
