= Alex Olanov =

- One Life to Live character
- Portrayed by: Tonja Walker
- Duration: 1990–1997, 2001–2002, 2007, 2009, 2011
- First appearance: August 24, 1990
- Last appearance: November 22, 2011
- Created by: Craig Carlson; Leah Laiman
- Introduced by: Paul Rauch
In-universe information
- Occupation: Entrepreneur; Stripper; Mayor of Llanview; FBI agent
- Family: Olanov
- Parents: Nat Olanov
- Husband: William J. Wentworth, Jr. (pre-1990); Carlo Hesser (1992–1996); Asa Buchanan (1994, 1996); David Vickers (2007)
- Children: Cutter Wentworth; Kimberly Andrews
- Stepchildren: Johnny Dee Hesser; Charlotte Hesser; Talia Hesser (1992–1996)

Alex Gwendolyn Olanov is a fictional character from the long-running ABC soap opera One Life to Live. She was portrayed by Tonja Walker since the character's inception in 1990 to 1997, with appearances in 2001, 2002, 2007, 2009, and twice in 2011 .

== Casting ==
The character was portrayed by Tonja Walker for various stints from 1990. Her initial run lasted until 1997, but she returned for guest stints in 2001, 2002 and 2007. In December 2008, it was reported that Walker would return to the role for a guest stint beginning on January 2, 2009. In January 2011, Walker announced on Facebook that she had been asked to return to the soap; she did not know how long her stint would last for, but said she did not care and that she felt "thrilled and grateful". The actress began filming the following month. Walker then returned for another stint beginning on November 17, 2011. Her return aired prior to the soap's finale following its cancellation.

== Development ==
During her time on the soap, Alex has a relationship with Carlo Hesser (Thom Christopher) and the pair cause "havoc" together. Walker and Christopher had a close relationship offscreen, with Walker explaining that they had "unconditional love and support" for each other and that Christopher and his wife sometimes would let Walker stay at their apartment when driving was too dangerous. Following Christopher's death in 2024, Walker paid tribute to their relationship on Instagram, writing of their working relationship, "I trusted him and we worked together with an almost magic energy. I'll never forget those moments those feelings when I would float down the stairs to the dressing room after our scenes. I'm so grateful for the opportunity I had to experience that joy... My beloved leading man, partner in crime in the world Daytime Entertainment Drama and in life. Never have I ever had so much support and felt so much trust toward anyone I've worked with, as we were seemingly of one mind at times."

== Storylines ==
In 1990, federal agent Alex Olanov comes to Llanview, Pennsylvania to help Bo Buchanan find his missing wife Sarah Gordon, presumably kidnapped by mob boss Carlo Hesser. Sarah is later presumed dead in a plane crash, and Alex develops feelings for Bo. When he falls in love with Cassie Callison, Alex becomes obsessed with him. Losing touch with reality, Alex tries to kill Cassie but is ultimately arrested and institutionalized. She later escapes and reappears at Bo and Cassie's wedding with a very-much-alive Sarah in tow, before being taken back to the mental institution.

Alex soon returns in 1992 and becomes the wife of Carlo. When he is murdered, she tries to assume control of his crime syndicate but is ultimately unsuccessful. Alex then pursues billionaire Asa Buchanan, who at first resists but ultimately marries her in a November 1994 Egyptian-themed wedding in Central Park. Alex is elected mayor of Llanview and Carlo turns up alive in 1996, invalidating her marriage to Asa; Carlo and Alex engage in an affair even as she divorces him and remarries Asa on March 29, 1996. They soon divorce, however, once Asa discovers her infidelity with Carlo; as a "pregnant" Alex prepares to remarry Carlo, Asa reveals that she is faking her condition and Carlo breaks off their engagement.

Carlo is seemingly murdered again in 1996, and Alex is arrested for the crime; hoping to get away with murder, she makes a deal with The Sun publisher Todd Manning, trading her exclusive story for his paying her legal fees. Lawyer Téa Delgado has the charges dropped. After donating bone marrow to Todd's baby daughter Starr Manning, Alex leaves town in July 1997 with a huge chunk of Asa's fortune and a very-much alive Carlo, who reveals that it was actually his twin brother Mortimer whom she killed.

In 2001, Asa brings Alex, who had been working as a stripper after Carlo dumped her yet again, back to town under the pretense of wanting to remarry her, but he marries Gabrielle Medina instead. Humiliated just as a vengeful Asa had wanted, Alex leaves Llanview but returns later that year for the reading of Asa's will; fleeing to Asa's private island with his ashes, she discovers a very-much-alive Asa. Alex attempts to blackmail Asa into remarrying her, but he turns the tables on Alex and tricks her into instead marrying a janitor (using Asa'a longtime alias, "Jeb Stuart").

In April 2002, Alex, now in the process of divorcing Jeb, returns to Llanview yet again at the behest of Todd Manning, who bribes her into donating bone marrow to his and Blair's ailing infant son Jack, who had been diagnosed with aplastic anemia (the same disease Todd's daughter, Starr, suffered from in 1997 when Alex donated bone marrow to her). After the successful operation, Alex attempts to seduce Bo; realizing he has no interest in her, Alex leaves town once again.

Alex returns to Llanview in August 2007, this time for Asa's real funeral. She overhears Asa's butler Nigel Bartholomew-Smythe tell Max Holden that David Vickers is secretly Asa's biological son, and takes off to find David. Smelling money, Alex discovers David working at a rehabilitation clinic in November 2007; acting the part of a wealthy widow with a sex addiction, Alex preys upon old acquaintance David's greed to convince him to marry her on November 9, 2007, never mentioning his true parentage. Both David and Alex are playing each other, falsely believing that the other has come into money. Alex and David get married and briefly go back to Llanview; they run into David's ex-wife Dorian Lord at the airport and follow her to the Buchanan ranch in Texas, where Asa's will has been read. Once there, Alex blackmails Nigel with the truth about David; he has her tied up and gagged in the barn. Alex is crushed to discover that David has been left no money, but Nigel gives Alex his own inheritance from Asa — Asa's yacht, and the deed to his private resort, St. Blaze's Island — in exchange for her silence. Placated, Alex dumps David unceremoniously and skips town. On her way out, Alex accidentally backs over Dorian with her car.

Unaware Alex owns St. Blaze's, Dorian vacations there in January 2009 and runs into Alex. When Dorian realizes Alex was the one responsible for her hit-and-run in 2007, she threatens to sue Alex for the accident; in exchange for Dorian's silence, Alex gives her the valuable information that David is Asa's son. Dorian returns to Llanview, leaving Alex relieved.

Alex reappears in March 2011 when Bo and Rex Balsom go in search of David, whom Clint Buchanan had kidnapped and thrown into a Moroccan prison as revenge for David destroying Clint's marriage. Clint blackmails Alex into moving David from Morocco to St. Blaze's, but Bo and Rex catch wind of the plot and confront her at her island resort. Alex denies any involvement in David's kidnapping, even when Bo and Rex find David in a plush suite at her resort. Alex insists to Bo and Rex that David came to St. Blaze's of his own free will, but the two men disbelieve her lies. After Bo and Rex leave St. Blaze's with a relieved David, Alex contacts Clint and informs him that she did as he asked, then warns him that David is headed back to Llanview with Bo and Rex.

In November 2011, Alex resurfaces again in Rio de Janeiro, Brazil, storming out of the office of plastic surgeon Dr. Fascinella complaining about a botched surgery on her face and encountered con artist Cutter Wentworth, who reveals himself to be the son she abandoned as a child, an act which caused Cutter's father William J. "Billy Joe" Wentworth Jr. to commit suicide and he and his sister (and Alex's daughter) Kimberly Andrews to be placed in foster care. Cutter is so furious upon seeing Alex that he strangles her until being stopped by his companion, an amnesiac who thinks she is Stacy Morasco who had plastic surgery to look like her sister (and Rex's assumed dead love) Gigi Morasco. Cutter and "Stacy" are in Brazil to find her plastic surgeon to reverse the surgery and are both followed by Rex and Cutter's former grifting partner and ex-girlfriend Christine Karr (a.k.a. Aubrey Wentworth, the real name of Cutter's sister which she used when scamming); when they arrive at the same office, and after Alex admits to knowing and disliking Rex, Cutter orders Alex to help him and "Stacy" escape without Rex's knowledge and become involved in Cutter's scheme to win her son's forgiveness. Cutter covers Alex's face with a bunch of bandages to fool Rex and Aubrey to believe that she was Gigi after she got her plastic surgery. Cutter wheels out Alex to the waiting room where Rex and Aubrey are there to find Cutter and Gigi's "imposter". Aubrey unties the bandages off Alex's face to reveal herself to Aubrey and Rex. Rex is surprised to see Alex again. Alex lies to him by saying that she teamed up with Cutter to pretend to be Gigi to get her share of the Buchanan fortune with Cutter but did not tell Rex and Aubrey that she was Cutter and Kim's mother. Rex believes Alex and Cutter's story (even though he later revealed to Aubrey that he did not really believed them at all). He tells them he did not want to be like them and already accepted Gigi's death. After Rex and Aubrey leave, Alex gives Cutter her business card, telling him to call her anytime he needs her help. Alex wishes Cutter and "Stacy" good luck before she leaves Rio to go back to her home in St. Blaze's Island.

== Reception ==
In 2011, Luke Kerr from Daytime Confidential wrote, "We can't get enough of Tonja Walker's Alex Olanov" and was thankful that she was returning prior to the soap's cancellation. Michael Fairman wrote on his website that Alex had a "fiery, passionate, and twisted relationship" with Carlo.
