= Gigi Morasco =

- One Life to Live character
- Portrayed by: Farah Fath
- Duration: 2007–12
- First appearance: October 24, 2007
- Last appearance: January 12, 2012
- Created by: Ron Carlivati
- Introduced by: Frank Valentini
In-universe information
- Other names: Gigi Balsom (2011–)
- Occupation: Waitress at The Bon Jour Cafe in Paris, Texas; Waitress at Rodi's; Student at Llanview University; Teaching assistant to Cristian Vega; Executive assistant at Buchanan Enterprises
- Sisters: Stacy Morasco
- Spouse: Rex Balsom (2011–)
- Sons: Shane Balsom
- Nieces: Sierra Morasco Fish

Gigi Morasco is a fictional character on the ABC soap opera One Life to Live. She was portrayed by Farah Fath from October 24, 2007, through January 12, 2012.

== Storylines ==
Gigi is introduced as a waitress at the Bon Jour Café in Paris, Texas. She is a single mother to Shane Morasco, having trouble making ends meet. Not realizing that her co-worker, Victoria Lord, is wealthy and only working as a waitress as a temporary escape from her life in Llanview, Gigi tells Viki her dreams of becoming rich. Gigi is eager to help when she meets Marcie McBain, who is a fugitive on the run with her adopted son, Tommy. Gigi at first believes that Marcie is running from an abusive husband, but learns differently when Tommy's birth father, Todd Manning, arrives at the Bon Jour looking for his son. Todd offers $1 million for information on Marcie's whereabouts; Gigi gives him false information to lead him astray. More of Gigi's past comes to light when Rex Balsom shows up at the diner: Gigi and Rex had dated in high school, but Rex abruptly disappeared in 2002 when he left for Llanview. Rex has come to town searching for Marcie, but Gigi again lies and sends Rex on the wrong trail. Gigi also sells Marcie's engagement ring to Rex, as Marcie is anxious to raise the necessary cash to leave the country. When Marcie's ring is recognized back in Llanview, her husband, Michael McBain, races back to Paris to confront Gigi, but Todd Manning and Lee Ramsey are already there, having taken Gigi and Shane hostage. Ramsey forces Gigi to lure Marcie back to Gigi's apartment before she and Tommy can skip town, and threatens her at gunpoint. Marcie arrives at Gigi's place, but at the last moment, Gigi screams for Marcie to run. Ramsey and Todd pursue Marcie, and Gigi and Shane are rescued.

Gigi is arrested for abetting a fugitive during Marcie's standoff with the police. The charges are ultimately dropped. John McBain brings Gigi and Shane to Llanview to testify for Marcie in her trial. Rex's fiancée, Adriana Cramer, discovers Shane's existence and suspects that he is Rex's son. Rex refuses to believe it and Gigi tells Rex that Shane's father is Brody Lovett, a deceased Navy SEAL.

On the day of Rex and Adriana's wedding, Gigi confesses her love to Rex. Adriana responds by punching Gigi. Before Gigi can leave the wedding, Brody arrives. Rex realizes that Adriana had lied to him about having found Brody and bringing him to Llanview. Although they were married, Rex and Adriana decide to spend some time apart. Rex and Gigi's feelings for one another continue to grow and Gigi finally tells Rex that Shane is his son. Meanwhile, Brody's post-war trauma is worsened by the threat of losing the family he has constructed with Gigi and Shane. He kidnaps Shane and accidentally shoots Rex. With Rex in a coma, Gigi tells Shane his true paternity, but Shane remains devoted to Brody. Adriana returns to take care of Rex and get rid of Gigi, but finally realizes that Rex loves Gigi when he awakens at the sound of her voice. Adriana agrees to a divorce, and Rex and Gigi move in together with Shane.

Gigi's sister, Stacy, is working as on exotic dancer in Las Vegas. In February 2009, she spots Rex and Gigi and follows them back to Llanview. Stacy decides that she wants Rex for herself just as Shane is diagnosed with leukemia. Learning of a matching donor, Stacy pretends to be the match and forces Gigi to break up with Rex in exchange for her blood. Gigi reluctantly arranges for Rex to come upon her in bed with Brody and ends things with Rex. Shane receives the transplant and improves, but Gigi is afraid to reveal Stacy's blackmail in case Shane needs more of her stem cells. In June 2009, Schuyler Joplin stuns Gigi with his theory that Stacy had switched someone else's stem cells for hers. Gigi tells Rex the truth and they reunite. Gigi and Rex plan to send Stacy packing, but Rex's one night with her has left her pregnant; she soon miscarries after a heated argument with Gigi. Stacy avoids telling Rex that she has lost the baby and becomes pregnant again by Oliver Fish. Rex and Gigi's relationship collapses.

Rex's biological father, Mitch Laurence, kidnaps Stacy in February 2010, intending to raise her baby as his heir. When she reveals that the baby is not Rex's, Mitch abandons Stacy in a blizzard. Gigi finds her and helps Stacy deliver a baby girl, whom she names Sierra Rose. Stacy falls through the ice of a frozen lake and is presumed dead.

Rex and Gigi try to help Shane, who was being viciously bullied by Jack Manning. Shane, so broken by what was happening to him, goes up to the roof of the high school, intent on committing suicide. Rex and Gigi talk their son down from killing himself. Rex asks Gigi to marry him, and she accepts.

Jack poses as a girl and invites Shane to a party so he and his friends can lock Shane in a basement. Shane immediately figures out that it’s Jack and tells his mother. Gigi makes Shane leave, goes onto his account, and finds out where this supposed party is. When she arrives, they lock her in a basement, thinking that she’s Shane. An old generator causes carbon monoxide to leak into the windowless room, and she passes out. Rex and Shane, while waiting for Gigi at the courthouse, run into Jack, who wonders how Shane escaped. Rex finds out about the planned meeting with Shane, and goes to the home to free Gigi. Rex takes who he believes to be Gigi to the hospital. "Gigi" is declared brain dead, is taken off life support, and her heart is transplanted into Clint Buchanan. In reality, it was Stacy who was found unconscious in the basement. After surviving her fall into the lake, Stacy had plastic surgery to look like Gigi. She confronted Gigi and the basement and was left unconscious to succumb to the carbon monoxide poisoning while Gigi was rescued and spirited away.

Natalie gets a psychic named Madame Delphina to find out why Gigi keeps appearing to Rex. She finds out that someone from the dead says "Spotted Pony". Rex later finds out from David that there is a strip club in Anchorage, Kentucky called The Spotted Pony. Rex, along with his sister Natalie, wants to go there to find out more by using the Buchanans' private jet. When Rex and Natalie arrives at The Spotted Pony, Natalie is mistaken for a stripper by one of the strippers at the club. Rex sends Natalie back to the jet, and wants to go back home after he feels he found no leads on Gigi, until he hears the announcer at the club announcing the next stripper out on the stage. The name of the next stripper turns out to be "Gigi" which is a stage name being used by Kimberly Andrews, who was the best friend of Gigi's dead sister Stacy! Rex confronts Kim about why she is using his late fiancée's name. Kim says that she's using her name to pay respects to Stacy, since Stacy used "Gigi" as her stripper stage name in Las Vegas. Rex tells Kim that Gigi had died, and wants Kim to know if she can help him find Gigi for him. Kim says that she can't help him find Gigi.

Rex tells Kim about all the things that happened in Llanview since she left town a year and a half ago before he leaves Kentucky to go back to Llanview (that Rex is Clint's and Echo DiSavoy's biological son; that Clint had a heart attack and needed Gigi's heart; Rex blackmailing Clint and extorting the Buchanan fortune and mansion from him in exchange for Gigi's heart). After Rex leaves Kentucky, Kim heads to the local hospital in Kentucky to visit a mysterious woman in her room. Kim tells the mystery woman that Rex was in town to investigate The Spotted Pony, and that he encountered her there. She also tells the mystery woman that she's going back to Llanview to win back her ex-husband Clint's heart, and to still get the piece of the Buchanan fortune, and to confront David for blackmailing her out of town with a mysterious secret that she was hiding from Clint. Kim leaves the mystery woman, promising to have her taken care of by the hospital staff while she is gone. After Kim leaves, it is revealed that the mystery woman is Stacy, Gigi's sister, thanks to a picture that is shown of Stacy and Kim that sits on her nightstand next to her bed.

On August 25, 2011, Rex while visiting Gigi's grave, it shows her birth date, however, her death date is scratched out. Kim after Rex leaves stops by to visit Gigi's grave. Rex digs up Gigi, to see if she is indeed alive. Rex discovers Gigi's dead body in the casket, meaning that Rex is definitely seeing Gigi's ghost after all. Unfortunately, Rex also discovers that Shane witnessed his mother's grave being exhumed, and is very angry at Rex about what he did to his deceased mother. Kim later visits Gigi's grave after her grave is exhumed and buried again by Rex.

On October 10, 2011, it is revealed that Stacy had plastic surgery to look like her sister Gigi. Kim remembers that she was reunited with Stacy when she came to the Spotted Pony while she was working there that she survived drowning in that frozen lake by getting out of the water and also had plastic surgery done to her in South America so that she could take over her sister's life. Kim disagreed with her plans and followed Stacy to Llanview. Kim tracked her down by going to Rex and Gigi's Llanfair carriage house where she saw Shane's laptop computer that she was headed to a rental house, where Shane's bully from high school Jack and his friends was setting up a trap for him as a cruel prank. When Kim went to the basement in the rental house, she saw Gigi already lying braindead, while Stacy was lying unconscious in another room in the basement, both of them poisoned by leaking carbon monoxide. Kim grabbed Stacy and put her in her car to take her to be treated in a hospital in Cherryvale before she moved to the Kentucky hospital after she fell into a coma. Kim is also unsure if it was Stacy that she rescued in the basement, hinting that maybe if Gigi was the one to survive after all.

On October 14, Stacy wakes up from her coma, where she is later to be watched after by Kim's con artist brother and former grifting partner Cutter Wentworth, (Kim was set up to take the fall for her brother's murder of a wealthy man named Mr. Berger, who she and Cutter was scamming back when she was a con artist, when he put too much "mickey" into his drink while she was seducing him by working as a stripper at the Spotted Pony. Kim's old French boarding school roommate Rama Patel helped conspired against her with Cutter so that she could avenge her for stealing her money to pay for her plastic surgery to improve her looks.) who decides to use Stacy to fool Rex thinking that his wife Gigi is still alive, so that he could use her as leverage to get to Rex's Buchanan fortune. Cutter went to meet Rex at Buchanan Enterprises when he was leaving his office. Cutter asked Rex to let him sign his name on the paperwork to hand over his family's fortune to him in exchange to bring Gigi back to him after he told him that she was still alive. Rex didn't believe Cutter, even after he tried to show a photo of Gigi he took of her on her hospital bed on his cell phone, with Rex thinking the photo of Gigi could be fake. Rex got into an ugly fight with Cutter before Bo broke up the fight. Cutter left the building saying he will regret his decision to not take up on his offer to reunite with Gigi.

Back in the Kentucky hospital, "Stacy" looked up details about Gigi and Stacy on the Internet on Cutter's laptop computer he left behind in her room. "Stacy" left the hospital to go to Llanview to stop by the Llanfair estate for a visit. Tina Lord opened the front door, and asked who she was, and "Stacy" told her that she thinks she's Gigi, and if she used to live there. Tina told her that she'll ask her relatives about Gigi. Tina told her niece Jessica Buchanan about Gigi, and Jessica told her that Gigi is dead. Tina returned to the door, but found that "Stacy" was gone. "Stacy" went to Gigi's grave site at the cemetery, and still felt very confused about her identity. Cutter found "Stacy" at the cemetery, and "Stacy" asked Cutter why she looks like her dead sister. Cutter told her that she wasn't Gigi, but she was her sister Stacy. Cutter told her that she survived drowning in that frozen lake, and got plastic surgery to look like Gigi so that she could take over her life, and that she also survived being trapped in that basement with the carbon monoxide leaking. Cutter also told her that she was rescued by her friend Kim, and that she took her to the hospital after she went into a coma. Cutter took "Stacy" to his home with her after she left a flower on Gigi's tombstone. The next morning, "Stacy" wakes up in bed at a motel room she shares with Cutter at The Minute Man. She asks Cutter if he knew anything about her life, and Cutter promised he would tell her everything she needed to know after she took a shower. After "Stacy" got out of the shower, she asks who he was arguing with at the door, and Cutter tells her it was his ex-girlfriend, but is not honest about what they were talking about.

On October 28, Cutter convinces "Stacy" to crash Brody and Natatlie's costume themed engagement party at the Buchanan Mansion on Halloween night with him so that when she sees Rex and Shane at the party, it could help her get her memories back. Cutter is dressed as a mummy and "Stacy" is dressed as Little Red Riding Hood wearing a mask on her face when they both arrive at the mansion being greeted by Rex at the front door. Cutter and "Stacy" enter the mansion to attend the party. "Stacy" tells Cutter that she felt strong feelings towards Rex when she first saw him at the front door. "Stacy" discovers a Halloween greeting card with a recorded voice by Gigi. Shane approaches her and thanks her for finding the card for him before she left him to escape to the stables when Shane asks for her name. Cutter finds "Stacy" with her mask off and puts it back on her when Aubrey arrives to take his mask off to foil Cutter's latest scheme. Rex also arrives at the stables and finds "Stacy" with Cutter. "Stacy" and Cutter leaves the party to head back home. The next morning after "Stacy" wakes up from dreaming about Rex, she confronts Cutter about why she's using her to get to Rex. Cutter explains to "Stacy" that he's helping her to reunite with Rex, and for him to get the Buchanan fortune from him, while they both benefit what they both want from Rex. Cutter also reminds "Stacy" that she used to be a con artist herself, and that's how she got to Rex before. After Cutter leaves the motel room, Rex goes to the door to break into the room to find "Stacy" himself. "Stacy" hid in the bathroom before Rex entered the room where she heard Rex scold her for trying to fool him to think that she was his dead fiancée Gigi. After Rex left the room and confronted Cutter about his scam after he arrived back home, "Stacy" told Cutter that she wanted out of their deal so that she could get plastic surgery to look like her old self again.

On November 14, "Stacy" gets ready to board a flight to Rio de Janeiro, Brazil to reverse her plastic surgery before she is stopped by Cutter at the airport. "Stacy" tells Cutter that she doesn't want to be part of his scam anymore, because she doesn't want to continue to hurt Rex and Shane by teasing them with her appearances haunting them in Llanview. Cutter becomes touched by her change of heart and drops his scam against Rex, and lets her go to Brazil on the condition that he can come along with her on the trip. "Stacy" asks Cutter about his past after they board the plane, and Cutter told his tragic past about how his father William J. "Billy Joe" Wentworth Jr., who grew up poor but became rich after investing his money in the stock market as a stock trader, was abandoned by his wife, and his and Kim's mother Alexandra, when his father suddenly committed suicide after becoming depressed and alienated himself from his loved ones after he failed to find his missing wife who took off with some of his money. Cutter also told her that he and his sister ended up in the foster care system after their father died, and he ran away from all of his foster homes to find Kim after he was separated by her going into the foster care system. He eventually found her, and they took care of themselves by becoming con artists to try to regain the wealth that they lost in their early childhoods. "Stacy" felt sorry for Cutter after hearing about his past.

"Stacy" and Cutter arrive in Rio in the waiting room outside of plastic surgeon Dr. Fascinella's office. "Stacy" and Cutter asks a nurse if they can find out if she had surgery there. The nurse gets "Stacy's" file and is shocked to see the before and after pictures of her surgery. Cutter and "Stacy" wait to see the doctor when Cutter's estranged mother Alexandra (who later revealed herself as Alex Olanov) comes out of the plastic surgeon's office to complain about a botched surgery on her cheek. After Cutter confronts Alex about abandoning her family and tells her about his father and her husband's suicide, Alex tells Cutter to talk to her in a private room to explain her side of the story. "Stacy" tells Cutter that she will be there for him as "back-up" if he needs her when he talks to his mother. Cutter and Alex enter the private room, when Cutter suddenly strangles her to avenge her for walking out on her family. "Stacy" enters the room to stop Cutter from choking Alex. When Rex and Aubrey arrive in Rio in the waiting room outside, Cutter involves Alex in his scheme to help hide "Stacy" from Rex and Aubrey, so that Alex can make it up to Cutter for abandoning her family. After Cutter and Alex fool Rex and Aubrey with their scheme, Alex gives Cutter her business card to contact her if he ever needs her help and wishes both Cutter and "Stacy" good luck before she goes back home to St. Blaze's Island. Cutter vows to "Stacy" that she will get her plastic surgery the next day.

On December 1, Cutter comforts "Stacy" after she wakes up from a nightmare about Gigi's death and being trapped in that carbon monoxide poisoned basement. Cutter confides in her about his fear about being a lot like his mother, who was a con artist like he became in his life. "Stacy" reassures Cutter that by going along with her to Rio to reverse her plastic surgery and dropping his scam against Rex, that he was on the path to redemption. Cutter planted a kiss on "Stacy". "Stacy" pulls away from Cutter after she is surprised that he kissed her. Cutter tells "Stacy" the reason that he kissed her was because he started to develop feelings for her, and that she helped him reform his grifting ways. "Stacy" and Cutter get a call from her plastic surgeon Dr. Fascinella to remind them about their scheduled appointment. "Stacy" and Cutter arrive at the doctor's office to have "Stacy" examined before her surgery. Dr. Fascinella asks Cutter into the waiting room with him so they could have a chat about "Stacy". Dr. Fascinella tells Cutter that the woman he just examined isn't Stacy but the woman that she based her altered looks on, which was her sister Gigi. Cutter figures out that "Stacy" was really Gigi, and that she was the one that really survived being trapped in that contaminated and toxic basement, and that Stacy was the one that really died and her heart was donated to Clint. Cutter still made Gigi think she was Stacy by saying that she could not have the surgery because of the toxic fumes she was exposed to.

Gigi and Cutter go to Paris, Texas after they randomly pick out their next destination on a globe so that they can start their new lives as a couple. When Gigi and Cutter stop by the Bon Jour Café, Gigi starts to get a feeling of déjà vu when she realized she probably worked there in her past. Cutter agrees with Gigi that she is getting her memories back. Gigi and Cutter get jobs at the Bon Jour Café. Gigi works her old job as a waitress, and Cutter gets a new job as a dishwasher. Cutter tells Gigi that he does not want to live in a small town like Paris, Texas after Cutter realizes that some of the townsfolk may start to recognize Gigi, and instead wants to move with Gigi to Paris, France, but Gigi still wants to stay in town and not move anywhere else with Cutter. Gigi, still unaware who she really is, kisses Cutter and says that there is something between them. Cutter agrees to stay with Gigi in Paris, TX, and leaves the Bon Jour to reserve a room for them at the Bon Sweets Motel. After Cutter leaves, Gigi sees that Viki and Rex have just arrived together at the Bon Jour. Gigi hides in the back room and calls Cutter on her cell phone to tell him that Viki and Rex are in town, and to help her sneak out of the Bon Jour before they see her. Cutter goes back to the Bon Jour, and hires a preacher he meets to distract Viki and Rex while Cutter sneaks Gigi out of the Bon Jour. Gigi and Cutter check out of their motel room to leave for their next destination. When Gigi steps out of the room to leave though, she sees Rex and Shane are staying at the same motel. Gigi rushes back in the room, and tells Cutter that they can't leave town yet because Rex and Shane are staying at the motel. Gigi passes out, and remembers seeing Kim talking to her after she rescued her from the trapped basement that was leaking carbon monoxide. Gigi also learns from Cutter that Stacy's friend Kim is in prison for murdering a rich guy at the Spotted Pony strip club in Anchorage, Kentucky, unaware that Cutter really committed the murder, and framed Kim for the crime. Cutter agrees to stay in Paris, Texas, until Rex, Shane, and Viki all leave town.

On December 20, Cutter and Gigi prepare to leave town until Cutter was distracted by the motel clerk about his payment not coming through to his credit card, and Gigi sneaks out of the room to go outside. Gigi arrives back at the Bon Jour Café to return her waitress uniform when she sees Rex, Shane, Viki, Moe, and Noelle inside. Cutter finds Gigi and tells her that he worked out his payment problems to the motel clerk so that they can finally leave town to board a flight to Las Vegas, Nevada. Gigi recognizes a man named Professor Delbert Fina Jr. when she sees next to him at the airport (the professor's father helped Rex and Gigi return to their present time when they both time traveled to 1968) where he tells her his personal motto to "don't give up" (which is the same message that was haunting Rex when he was haunted by visions of Gigi). Gigi leaves the airport to go back to the Bon Jour Café, where she finally sees Rex face-to-face for the first time since her "death". Rex scolds Gigi (still thinking she is "Stacy") for pretending to be her sister, and trying to scam him out of the Buchanan fortune with Cutter. Gigi tells Rex that she was trying to get her memories back when she showed up at the Buchanan Mansion on Halloween night, and that Cutter later dropped his scam to help get her plastic surgery to look like Stacy again, but could not get the surgery because she was in a coma because of the toxic fumes she inhaled being trapped in that basement. Rex still disbelieves her (even though Gigi remembers previously working at the Bon Jour Café in Paris, Texas) and gets into a fight with Gigi, but Cutter arrives at the Bon Jour to break up the fight, and to finally confess that "Stacy" really is Gigi. Rex dis believe Cutter when he tells the truth, and tells Gigi that Cutter murdered a rich guy back in Kentucky and framed his sister Kim for the crime. Rex has Cutter tied up until the police arrive to have Cutter arrested and taken away to a prison in Kentucky. Rex continues to argue to Gigi (as "Stacy") about her part in Gigi's "death" until Professor Delbert Fina Jr. arrives at the diner to help Rex and Gigi figure out what happened on the night of Gigi's "death" by hooking up his time traveling remote control to a TV set so that they could all witness the night of Gigi's "death".

On December 23, 2011, it is revealed by Professor Fina's time traveling device that "Stacy" is indeed the real Gigi, who escaped the basement (along with Stacy switching her clothes and Gigi's wedding dress to wear to fool Rex) and lost her memory after she knocked out Stacy in self-defense. Rex and Gigi woke up with each other the next day at the Bon Sweets Motel, grateful that they are together again. Rex also tells Gigi that Stacy's heart, not Gigi's, was donated to Clint after he suffered from a heart attack. Rex calls Shane to tell him that he has a surprise for him when he comes back home, and Shane tells him that he has a surprise for him, too. Rex and Gigi return to Llanview, and Rex explains to Shane that his Aunt Stacy was the one that died in the basement, not his mom and Shane and Gigi are finally reunited. Gigi finds out from Rex that he and Aubrey were in a romantic relationship with each other when he thought that Gigi was dead, and that his feelings towards Aubrey disappeared when he found out that Gigi was alive. Rex went over to the Buchanan Mansion to tell Aubrey the truth about Gigi/Stacy and to break up with her, while Gigi and Shane went over to the police station to reveal Gigi still being alive after Shane told Gigi and Rex that he put Jack in jail for being responsible for Gigi's "death", even though Stacy really died in that basement instead. Gigi surprised Téa and Jack with her appearance after thinking that she was dead. Gigi was ready to confront Jack, but Shane told her that he wasn't worth getting even with anymore since he wasn't really responsible for her death. Gigi met and surprised John and Natalie with her appearance, and remembered that she had the recorder with the tape that had Marty confessing to her doctor that John was the biological father of Natalie's child Liam. Natalie reassured Gigi that she already found out the truth before she married Brody where he confessed to knowing the truth about Liam's paternity. Gigi and Shane left the police station to go to Llanfair, where Gigi reunited with Viki and Clint. Rex showed up to surprise Gigi by proposing to her again. On New Year's Eve 2011, Rex and Gigi are married in front of their family and friends at Llanfair.

On January 12, 2012, Gigi, Rex, and Shane move to England so Shane can attend an art school.
