= Shane Morasco =

- One Life to Live character
- Portrayed by: Austin Williams
- Duration: 2007–12
- First appearance: October 29, 2007
- Last appearance: January 12, 2012
- Created by: Ron Carlivati
- Introduced by: Frank Valentini
In-universe information
- Occupation: Student at the Phil Jimenez School of Cartoon and Graphic Art
- Family: Buchanan
- Parents: Rex Balsom; Gigi Morasco
- Grandparents: Clint Buchanan; Echo DiSavoy; Roxy Balsom (adoptive)
- Aunts and uncles: Cord Roberts; Natalie Buchanan; Kevin Buchanan (adoptive); Joey Buchanan (adoptive); Jessica Buchanan; Schuyler Joplin (legal); Stacy Morasco
- First cousins: C. J. Roberts; Sarah Roberts; Duke Buchanan (adoptive); Bree Brennan; Ryder Ford; Liam McBain; Sierra Rose Fish

Shane Morasco is a fictional character from the daytime soap opera, One Life to Live.

== Storylines ==
Gigi initially befriends Viki Davidson (Erika Slezak) in 2007 when both women are working at the Bonjour Café in Paris, Texas. Despite being energetic and curious, Shane is asthmatic, and has attacks which can send him to the emergency room. Gigi asserts that his father is a deceased war hero, a story Shane thrills to hear again and again, but is especially troubled when her old high school boyfriend Rex Balsom later appears at the Bonjour.

Fugitive teacher Marcie McBain (Kathy Brier) — in disguise as Bon Jour waitress "Sally Ann" — recommends fantasy books to Shane to encourage him to read. When Todd Manning (Trevor St. John) and Lee Ramsey (Hunt Block) come to Paris to apprehend Marcie, Shane is taken hostage along with Gigi, whom they hope can lure Marcie into a trap. After Marcie is apprehended, Gigi is arrested for aiding and abetting a fugitive, but Viki pays Gigi's bail. She and Shane are reunited as Viki returns to Llanview.

Gigi and Shane later go to Llanview to testify in the case against Marcie. Rex's fiancée Adriana Cramer (Melissa Fumero) discovers Shane's existence, and suspects that he is Rex's son. Rex refuses to believe it, and Gigi confirms that Shane's father is a deceased Navy SEAL. Gigi is troubled as Rex begins getting closer to Shane. On March 17, 2008, she admits aloud that Rex is Shane's father. Gigi and Shane celebrate Shane's 12th birthday on March 25, 2008.

With Gigi a constant presence and as Rex gets closer to Shane, Adriana seeks information on Shane's father Brody Lovett (Mark Lawson) in hopes of gaining some leverage against Gigi. She soon discovers that Brody is alive; wanting to keep him and Gigi apart, Brody's mother had told Gigi that he had died in combat, and had told Brody that Gigi had run off with someone else. Brody confirms that Gigi had been pregnant when he met her, and Adriana pays him to come to Llanview. Shane is as ecstatic as Gigi is shocked to see Brody, and Gigi finds herself forced to keep up the lie that Brody is Shane's father. Later romantically involved with Rex, Gigi eventually tells him that he is Shane's biological father. Meanwhile, Shane and Brody have become attached to each other, and Brody begins poisoning Shane's mind against Rex. As Gigi and Rex prepare to tell Shane the truth, an unraveling Brody prepares to do whatever it takes to keep his "son". Brody kidnaps Shane and soon begins to hallucinate visions of an Iraqi boy he had accidentally killed in Iraq. In a standoff with Rex and the police, Brody shoots Rex, who is rushed to the hospital and falls into a coma. Gigi finally tells Shane the truth about his paternity, and although unhappy with the news at first, Shane begins to accept it. Brody ends up in an Army hospital, horrified to learn what he had done; Rex recovers and is able to get the charges against Brody dropped. Brody shares an emotional goodbye with Shane and is admitted to St. Anne's mental hospital for treatment. Though still concerned for Brody, Shane continues to warm to Rex as their father-son bond develops.

On March 12, 2009, Shane is diagnosed with leukemia, Gigi's sister Stacy (Crystal Hunt) later learns of a matching donor. Wanting Rex for herself, Stacy pretends that she is the match and forces Gigi to break up with Rex in exchange for her blood. Shane receives the transplant and improves, but Gigi is afraid to reveal Stacy's blackmail in case Shane needs more of her stem cells.

In February 2011, Shane starts being bullied by Jack Manning (Andrew Trischitta) in high school; Jack and his friends steal money from the school and frame Shane, write nasty things on his Myface page, take his inhaler when he is having an asthma attack, and upload a video of Shane naked on the Internet. The abuse drives Shane to consider suicide by jumping off the roof of the school. Rex and Gigi arrive in time to talk him down, and, not knowing what else to do, take him to the hospital to have him psychologically tested. Rex, Gigi, and Shane later have a family therapy session with Dr. Buhari to help Shane cope with being bullied at school. Rex and Gigi also plan to get married. On June 6, Shane finally stands up to Jack and intentionally drops a barbell on his toe, breaking it, much to the surprise of Jack and his friend Brad Kozinski (Frank Dolce).

Gigi leaves to confront Jack before going to her wedding and is declared brain dead after she inhales carbon monoxide from a trap set by Jack and his friends on June 14–15, 2011, in the basement of a rental home owned by Brad's dad.

On October 12, at the very beginning of the October 13 episode, Shane pulls a gun on Jack but misses and shoots the tree instead. Bo (Robert S. Woods) and Rex stop Shane from shooting Jack, and they all go the police station. Shane admits to knocking Jack over the head the night of his uncle's murder with Rex's gun, and that he tried to kill him, but changed his mind and took Jack to drop him off at the hospital. The gun is put through a test and it is not the murder weapon, proving Shane did not shoot Victor. Jack asks Brody if charges will be filed against Shane, and Brody asks "Why? You weren't charged for Gigi's death". On October 14, Blair finds out and asks Bo if Shane was charged. He says no, and Blair wonders if it is because Shane and Rex are family. Bo says no and explains that if that happened, Jack would not go free either.

Two months later, Shane meets Neela Patel (Teresa Patel), who is a new girl at school that Jack has a crush on; Neela has a crush on Jack, too. Shane hires Neela to secretly record her conversation with Jack about being responsible for Gigi's death. After Neela records her conversation with Jack for Shane, Jack is finally arrested for Gigi's death. On December 27, Shane is reunited with his mom. Rex and Gigi both explain to Shane that his Aunt Stacy (Farah Fath), not Gigi, was the one that died in that basement. Gigi and Shane both go to the police station to explain to everyone that his mother is alive, and that Jack wasn't responsible for Gigi's death after all. Gigi confronts Jack for almost killing her, but Shane tells her it is not worth getting even with Shane because he was not really responsible for her "death". Gigi and Shane then go back to Llanfair when Rex surprised Gigi by proposing to her again. On New Year's Eve 2011, Shane's parents get married in front of their family and friends at Llanfair.

On January 12, 2012 Gigi, Rex, and Shane decide to move to England so Shane can attend art school. Gigi had filled out an application when Shane was still bullied by Jack during the previous school year so that he can be in a safer environment. They watch the last episode of Fraternity Row and say goodbye to their friends and family before leaving Llanview to move to England.

== See also ==
- Buchanan family
