= Clint Buchanan =

- One Life to Live character
- Jerry verDorn as Clint Buchanan
- Portrayed by: Clint Ritchie (1979–2004); Jerry verDorn (2005–13); John Brotherton (2008)
- Duration: 1979–1999; 2003–2013
- First appearance: September 10, 1979
- Last appearance: August 19, 2013
- Created by: Gordon Russell and Sam Hall
- Introduced by: Joseph Stuart (1979); Frank Valentini (2003); Jennifer Pepperman (2013)
- Clint Ritchie as Clint Buchanan
In-universe information
- Occupation: CEO of Buchanan Enterprises; Former Editor of The Banner; Former Editor of The Chronicle
- Family: Buchanan
- Parents: Asa Buchanan; Olympia Buchanan
- Stepmother: Pamela Oliver Stuart (1976, 1986–87); Samantha Vernon (1981); Delilah Ralston (1983); Becky Lee Hunt (1983); Renée Divine (1988–92, 1999–2001, 2004–07); Blair Cramer (1992); Alex Olanov (1994, 1996); Gabrielle Medina (2001–02); Gretel Rae Cummings (2002–03)
- Brothers: Bo Buchanan
- Half-brothers: Ben Davidson
- Spouse: Victoria Lord (1982–85,1986–94); Lindsay Rappaport (1998–99); Nora Hanen (2009–10); Kimberly Andrews (2010)
- Sons: Cord Roberts; Rex Balsom
- Daughters: Jessica Buchanan; Natalie Buchanan
- Adoptive sons: Kevin Buchanan; Joey Buchanan
- Grandsons: C.J. Roberts; Duke Buchanan; Shane Morasco; Kevin Buchanan Jr.; Ryder Ford; Liam McBain
- Granddaughters: Sarah Roberts; Bree Brennan; Chloe Brennan
- Uncles: Pike Buchanan
- Aunts: Jeannie Buchanan
- Nephews: David Vickers Buchanan; Drew Buchanan; Matthew Buchanan
- First cousins: Rafe Garretson; Austin Buchanan

Clint Buchanan is a fictional character from the American soap opera One Life to Live.

== Casting ==
The role was originated on September 10, 1979, by actor Clint Ritchie, portraying the role nearly continuously through December 30, 1998. Ritchie reappeared on the series in 1999, 2003, and 2004. Actor Jerry verDorn assumed the role on October 25, 2005, and remained until the original television finale on January 13, 2012. verDorn reprised the role when new daily episodes of OLTL debuted on Hulu, iTunes, and FX Canada via The Online Network April 29, 2013. John Brotherton played a young Clint in a 2008 storyline in which the characters Bo and Rex find themselves in 1968.

== Storylines ==
=== 1979–2001 ===
The eldest son of Buchanan patriarch Asa Buchanan and his first wife Olympia, actor Clint Ritchie debuts onscreen as Clinton (simply known as "Clint") on the episode first-run September 10, 1979, the first of the Buchanan family of Texas to arrive in fictional Llanview, Pennsylvania. Clint, who is working as a prize-winning journalist in Arizona at the time, is appointed by Viki Lord Riley's editor-in-chief husband of her newspaper, The Banner when Joe Riley learns he is suffering from a terminal brain tumor and must make arrangements for a succeeding editor to the periodical's news operation. After a failed relationship with Pat Ashley, Clint becomes close to Viki, eventually marrying her in 1982 and adopting her and deceased Joe's two sons, Kevin and Joey Riley. Clint and Viki's marriage is strong but troubled. In 1983, Clint engages in a brief romantic affair after being seduced by Banner photographer Echo DiSavoy (actress Kim Zimmer), and during The Banner's 50th anniversary celebration, Viki suffered from a recurrence of her dissociative identity disorder, which recurs when Viki discovers that her former ward Tina Clayton (Andrea Evans) is her sister. Tina makes an enemy in Clint as she conspires to use Viki's illness to take control of their father Victor Lord's fortune, but Clint and Viki triumph and have a child of their own, Jessica, in 1986. That same year, Clint discovers that he is the father of former flame Maria Roberts' adult son Cord, who is now married to Tina. Over the years, Clint and Viki endure much domestic drama, from indiscretions between them, Viki's battles with dissociative identity disorder and family squabbles among the Lords, Cramers, and Buchanans. Married and divorced twice, the two remain great friends.

Clint leaves town for London in 1998, returning for several brief periods. In 2001, it is revealed that Viki had been drugged and raped by Mitch Laurence (Roscoe Born) in 1986, and given birth to twins. Mitch is in fact the father of Jessica, and Clint had fathered Jessica's twin, Natalie Balsom (Melissa Archer). Mitch had infant Natalie kidnapped and raised by another couple, and he orchestrates her return in 2001 to devastate Viki and her family.

=== 2005–12 ===
In 2005, Clint (Jerry verDorn onward) returns for an extended stay and soon breaks it off with girlfriend Dallas Jones. The entire family is devastated by Asa's death in August 2007, and Bo and Clint form a closer bond. Clint's relationship with Viki is complicated by his subsequent romance with Dorian Lord, Viki's longtime nemesis. After Clint's messy breakup with Dorian, she seeks revenge by taking over Buchanan Enterprises. Romance begins to blossom between Clint and his brother Bo's ex-wife Nora Hanen, only to be temporarily complicated by the return of Clint's ex-girlfriend Dallas in July 2008. With Nora's help, Clint finally gets BE back from Dorian. In 2009, Bo and Nora are thrown together when their son Matthew is paralyzed in an accident; threatened by their closeness, Clint proposes. He and Nora marry, though Bo and Nora kiss the night before. Bo and Nora soon find themselves back in love; finding out, a vengeful Clint reveals the affair publicly to negatively impact Bo and Nora's careers. Though Asa had left his mansion to Nora, Clint forces her to sign it over to him or risk a costly lawsuit for damages to his reputation as a result of her affair. Clint encourages new mayor Dorian to fire Bo as Police Commissioner, and resumes an affair with his assistant, ex-stripper Kimberly Andrews. They marry on March 11, 2010.

David Vickers comes to town and threatens Kim with a secret that she's been hiding from Clint that would ruin her life and her marriage to Clint. The only way David will not reveal her secret to Clint is that she leaves Clint and also leave town. Kim comes up with a story on how she cheated on Clint and how she cannot live with herself any longer because of it. Kim leaves the mansion and has not been seen since. Clint finds out David was responsible for sending Kimberly away, and has him thrown into a Moroccan prison the day he is supposed to marry Dorian. Meanwhile, Bo proposes to Nora, and she accepts, making Clint even more bitter and vengeful, as a result. He sees Inez Salinger, though later, it is clear that Clint is distrustful of her son, Robert Ford, believing that he took advantage of Jessica when she was mentally unstable. He concocts an elaborate scheme to break Bo and Nora up, using Inez and her abusive ex-husband, Eddie Ford. In the meantime, he also manipulates Matthew into believing Bo is cheating on Nora. Bo & Nora, though, find out the truth and realize Clint poses a danger to them.

Rex Balsom looks into his past, after finding out he was abandoned at birth and taken in by Roxy Balsom. Clint has a private investigator follow him, though his motives are unknown. Eventually, Echo DiSavoy returns to town, and it is revealed that Echo and Clint are Rex's biological parents. Clint, though, refuses to acknowledge Rex as his own, claiming he's not worthy to be associated with the Buchanans. He threatens to have Rex sent to prison if Echo reveals Rex's paternity. To protect Rex, she claims Viki's husband, Charlie Banks, is Rex's father. Clint has his assistant, Vimal, change the paternity test Rex has done, and also the test Jessica has done for her unborn baby, so she won't know that Robert Ford is the biological father of her son. Eventually, Clint is exposed at Natalie and Jessica's double wedding.

Echo tells Clint not to tell Charlie that she knew the truth about Rex's paternity. Clint agrees, but secretly records the conversation. Later, he suffers a heart attack while Dorian is around, but she refuses to call for help unless he hands over the recording. He agrees, and is admitted to the hospital. Clint finds out he needs to have a heart transplant done because the damage is too much. Knowing the chances of getting a heart transplant are slim, Clint accepts the fact that he is dying. Initially, he tries to keep it a secret from his family, but he tells them, and they rally around Clint. Later, Rex's fiancée, Gigi Morasco, is declared brain dead after trying to protect her and Rex's son, Shane, and her heart turns out to be a perfect match for Clint. Rex, though, refuses to hand over Gigi's heart, and Clint decides he will die, after all. However, Rex changes his mind, telling Clint to sign over his company and mansion in exchange for Gigi's heart.

Clint ends up moving into Viki's house after confessing to the many crimes he has committed over the last year and being sentenced to house arrest. While he is there, he and Viki become close. When she leaves at one point, Kimberly shows up and tries to help Clint get his company back by blackmailing Echo into having Rex turning it over. Echo forges Rex's signature when he refuses, but Rex finds out. He voluntarily gives the mansion and business back to Clint, but Clint lets him keep the mansion. Kimberly tells Clint she wants a second chance with him, but Clint has fallen back in love with Viki and tells Kimberly he is uninterested. Viki comes back, and initially avoids Clint, but finally confronts him at Christmas about his kiss with Kimberly, and Clint tells her that he let Kimberly go because he wants to be with her. Clint and Viki reunite.

Clint finds out Gigi is actually alive, and he actually received her sister, Stacy's, heart. Rex proposes to Gigi, and they marry at Viki's house on New Year's Eve. However, the power goes out at midnight, and it is revealed there was a massive prison breakout. Mitch makes his way to Viki's house, and kidnaps Natalie, saying he'll only return her in exchange for Jessica. Clint refuses to hand Jessica over, but Jessica voluntarily goes with John McBain, Natalie's boyfriend, to rescue her sister. Meanwhile, Allison Perkins shows up at Viki's house, and tells Viki and Clint that Jessica's is Clint's biological daughter, not Mitch's. She shoots Viki, and Clint suffers heart failure while trying to help her. Eventually, the two are rescued by John and Natalie. Clint has a DNA test run to confirm what Allison said, and he, Viki, Jessica, and Natalie celebrate when they find out Jessica is in fact Clint's biological daughter. Clint declares his undying love to Viki and asks her to marry him for a third time.

=== 2013 ===
When the series picks back up again, it is revealed that Viki accepted Clint's proposal, and that thanks to the work of lawyer Téa Delgado, he is no longer under house arrest. He asks Bo to be the best man at the wedding which has been set for sometime in June.
