= Galen Gering =

American actor (born 1971)

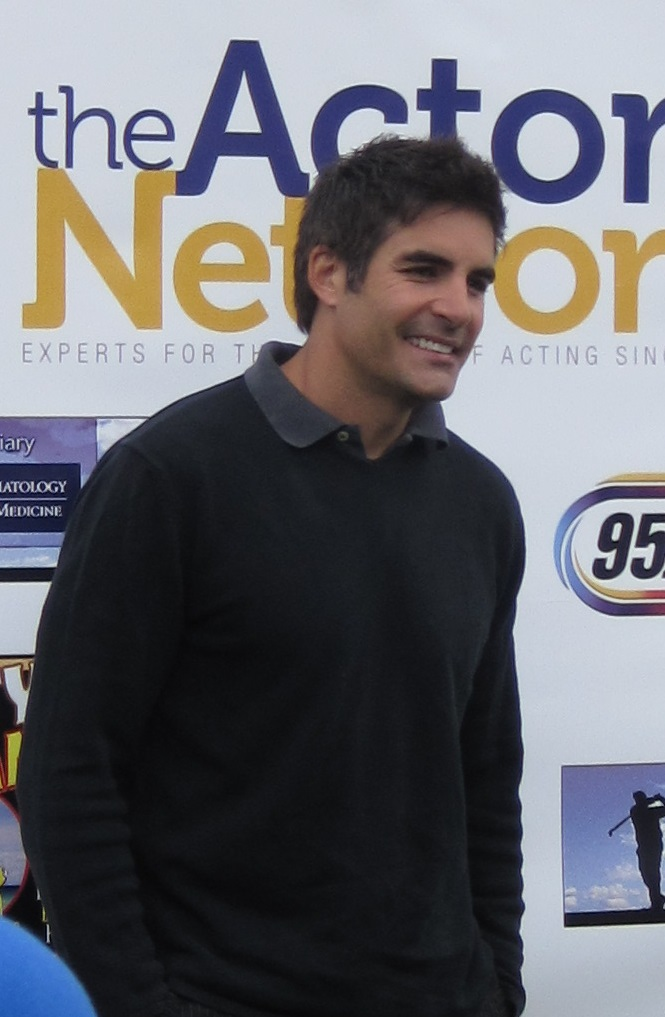
- Gering at the 8th Annual Hack n' Smack Celebrity Golf Tournament in 2011
- Born: Galen Laius Gering; February 13, 1971 (age 55); Los Angeles, California, U.S.
- Occupation: Actor
- Years active: 1999–present
- Spouse: Jenna Hudlett
- Children: 2

Galen Laius Gering (born February 13, 1971) is an American actor most known for his portrayal of characters on daytime soap operas. He currently plays the role of Rafe Hernandez on the long-running NBC soap opera Days of Our Lives. He also appeared on the NBC daytime soap opera Passions as Luis Lopez-Fitzgerald.

== Early life ==
Galen Laius Gering was born in Los Angeles, California, to Alan Gering and Michele de Oñate, a renowned west coast artist. He is of Russian Jewish descent on his father's side and French and Spanish/Basque descent on his mother's side (his maternal great-grandfather was a Basque immigrant). He has an older sister, Charissa. Gering was close to his grandmother, who was also an artist.

At the age of 18, Gering moved to New York City to start a modeling career and finished high school remotely. He traveled Europe as a model before attending New York University for a year. Gering finished college at the University of Miami where he studied creative writing and film.

== Career ==
In 1999, Gering learned of a role in an upcoming NBC daytime soap called Passions through Irene Marie Models. By the time Gering graduated from UM, he was already taping Passions, on which he had landed the role of Officer Luis Lopez-Fitzgerald. Gering was named one of People's 50 Most Beautiful People in 2000, and remained with Passions until its cancellation in 2008.

On October 31, 2008, Gering debuted on another NBC soap, Days of Our Lives, as Rafe Hernandez, an FBI agent who is hired to guard Sami Brady while she is under witness protection. He has also appeared in over 50 national commercials.

On September 25, 2011, Gering and his wife, Jenna, starred on the E! reality series Dirty Soap together with their kids. The show ended on November 13, 2011, after only one season.

== Filmography ==
Film and television roles
Year	Title	Role	Notes
1999–2008	Passions	Luis Lopez-Fitzgerald	Main role
2003	Miss Match	Adrian	Episode: "Forgive and Forget"
2006	Mein Liebchen	Bradley	Short film
2008–present	Days of Our Lives	Rafe Hernandez	Main role
2009	10 Items or Less	Dale	Episode: "Sesquicentennial"
2009–12	Venice: The Series	Owen Brogno	36 episodes
2011	Dirty Soap	Himself	5 episodes
2015	Talking Marriage with Ryan Bailey	Himself	1 episode
2017	Battle of the Network Stars	Himself	1 episode

== Personal life ==
Gering is married to Jenna Hudlett and they have two sons together.

== See also ==
- Lopez-Fitzgerald family
- Supercouple
