= John-Paul Lavoisier =

American film and television actor

- Born: John-Paul Seponski; March 12, 1980 (age 46); Phoenixville, Pennsylvania, U.S.
- Education: University of the Arts
- Occupations: Film and television actor
- Years active: 2001–present

John-Paul Seponski (born March 12, 1980) is an American film and television actor. He is best known for playing Rex Balsom in the American soap opera television series One Life to Live from 2002 to 2012.

== Life and career ==
Lavoisier was born in Phoenixville, Pennsylvania. He attended the University of the Arts, majoring in jazz percussion. He began his career in 2001, appearing in the soap opera television series All My Children.

Later in his career, Lavoisier played Rex Balsom on One Life to Live from 2002 until the show's cancellation in 2012. He then played Philip Kiriakis on Days of Our Lives from 2015 to 2016, and reprised his role again in 2023. He guest-starred in television programs including Beacon Hill, Winterthorne, Sex and the City, The Mentalist, Dirty Soap and Anger Management. He also appeared in films such as No Place Like Home, Wolves of Wall Street, Liza, Liza, Skies Are Grey and Killer in Suburbia.
