= Farah Fath =

American actress

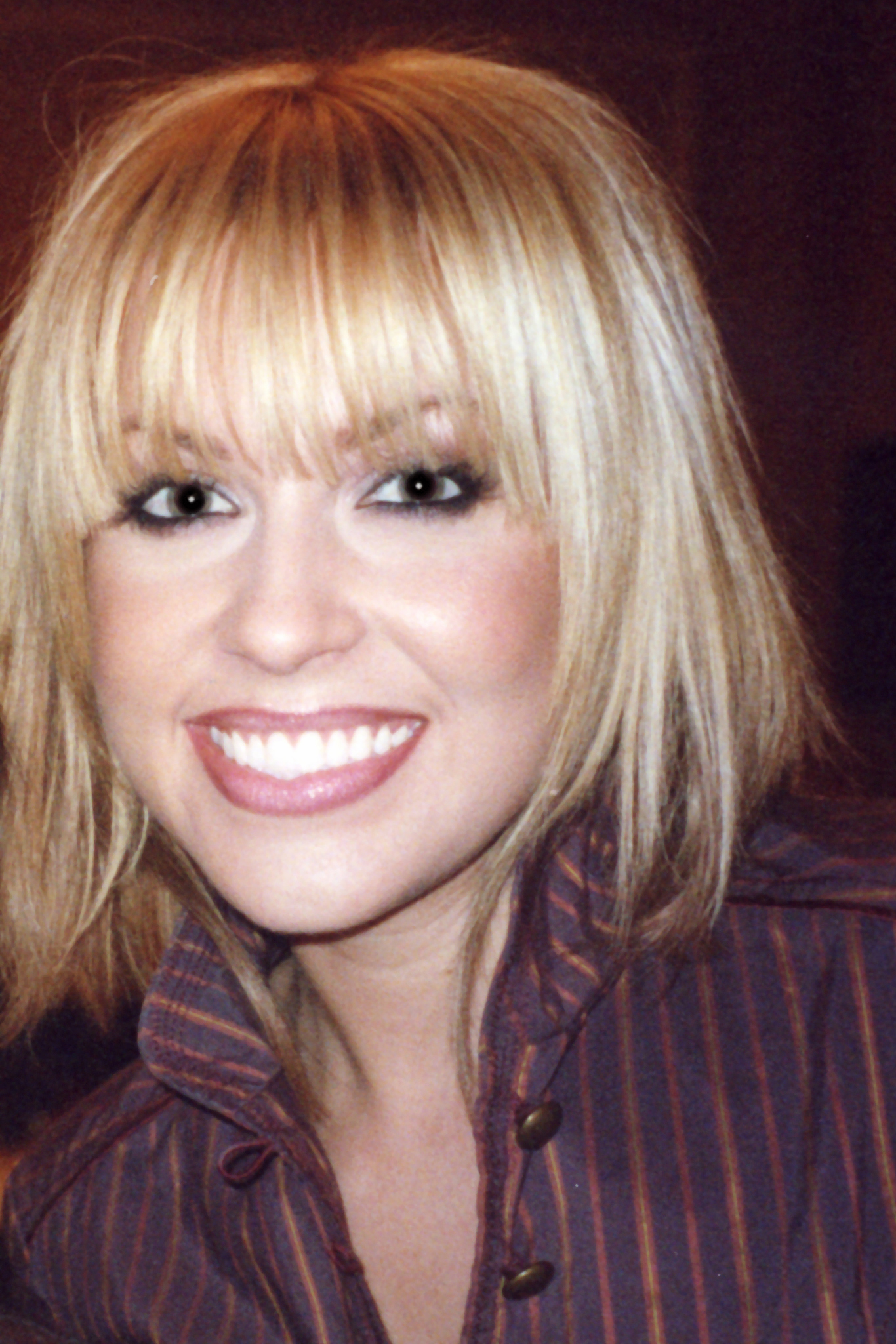
- Fath in June 2005
- Born: Farah LeeAllen Fath; May 1, 1984 (age 42); Lexington, Kentucky, U.S.
- Occupation: Actress
- Years active: 1999–present
- Spouse: Phil Galfond (m. 2015)
- Children: 1

Farah LeeAllen Fath Galfond (born May 1, 1984) is an American actress. She portrayed Mimi Lockhart on the NBC soap opera Days of Our Lives from 1999 to 2007, and Gigi Morasco on the ABC Daytime soap opera One Life to Live from 2007 to 2012. Fath returned to Days of Our Lives temporarily in 2018.

== Early life and career ==
Fath was born in Lexington, Kentucky, to Lisa and Greg Fath. She has a younger sister, Victoria "Tori" Fath. She began her career in show business at the age of five, and was voted Miss Kentucky Preteen in 1995. She appeared in print campaigns for Duncan Hines and in a national commercial for Pringles potato chips.

== Television ==
Fath joined Days of Our Lives as Mimi Lockhart in September 1999, and left the show in February 2007.

Fath debuted in the contract role of Gigi Morasco on the ABC soap opera One Life to Live on October 24, 2007, and left the series in June 2011. On October 10, 2011, Fath returned to One Life to Live as Gigi's sister Stacy Morasco, who has plastic surgery to look like Gigi. The character is later revealed to be Gigi herself.

On September 25, 2011, Fath appeared on the American reality television series Dirty Soap with several other soap opera performers, including her then-boyfriend, John-Paul Lavoisier.

In May 2015, it was announced that Fath will work with fellow Days of Our Lives alumna Alison Sweeney on the second installment of Murder She Baked for Hallmark Movies & Mysteries.

On May 8, 2018, it was announced that Fath will be returning to Days of Our Lives, reprising her role as Mimi Lockhart. Fath tweeted that it would be for a "handful of episodes"

== Poker career ==
Fath has been playing poker as far back as 2010, and has won two daily tournaments at Aria Resort and Casino where she regularly plays. Fath has also collected six cashes at the World Series of Poker.

Fath has made regular TV poker appearances on PokerGO shows including High Stakes Poker, World Series of Poker coverage and Poker After Dark. In Season 8 of Poker After Dark, Fath headlined "Game of our Lives" week that also included Bill Perkins, Matt Berkey, Jean-Robert Bellande, and Bill Klein.

As of March 2023, Fath's live tournament winnings exceeded $110,000.

== Personal life ==
Fath dated her One Life to Live costar John-Paul Lavoisier, who played Rex Balsom, from 2008 to 2013.

In November 2014, Soap Opera Digest reported that Fath was engaged to her boyfriend of two years, Phil Galfond. Fath and Galfond married on May 15, 2015. Their son, Spencer, was born in December 2018.

== Filmography ==
Year	Film	Role	Notes
1999–2007, 2018	Days of Our Lives	Mimi Lockhart	September 16, 1999 – March 1, 2007, October 5-November 6, 2018
2003	Friends	Herself (uncredited)	1 Episode
2004	American Dreams	Playboy Bunny	1 Episode
2007–2012	One Life to Live	Gigi Morasco; Stacy Morasco	October 24, 2007 – January 12, 2012; October 11, 2011, December 22, 2011, December 23, 2011
2011	Dirty Soap	Herself	September 25, 2011 – November 13, 2011
2013	Non-Stop	Ellen	TV Movie
2015	Murder, She Baked: A Plum Pudding Mystery	Courtney Miller	Hallmark Movie
