= Dirty Soap =

2011 American reality TV series

- Genre: Reality
- Starring: Kelly Monaco; Kirsten Storms; Farah Fath; Nadia Bjorlin; Jenna Gering; Galen Gering; John-Paul Lavoisier; Brandon Beemer
- Narrated by: cast members
- Country of origin: United States
- Original language: English
- No. of seasons: 1
- No. of episodes: 8

Production
- Executive producers: Kelly Ripa; Mark Consuelos; Amber Mazzola
- Production location: Los Angeles, California
- Camera setup: Single camera
- Running time: 42 minutes

Original release
- Network: E!
- Release: September 25 – November 13, 2011

Dirty Soap is an American reality television series that debuted on E! on September 25, 2011. The series focuses on the personal and professional lives of daytime soap opera stars and their off-screen time. The series was produced by Kelly Ripa, Mark Consuelos, and Amber Mazzola. On January 25, 2012, E! cancelled the series after its only season.

== Cast ==
- Kelly Monaco – Monaco is best known to fans as a regular on General Hospital, and a contestant on Dancing with the Stars. Having ended an eighteen-year relationship, Monaco wants to return to the dating scene.
- Kirsten Storms – Storm's resume includes Days of Our Lives and General Hospital. She is also best friends with Kelly, whom she comforts about an ended relationship. She grows seriously ill in the middle of the season.
- Farah Fath – Fath is another alum of Days of our Lives where she and Kirsten were regulars. She later joined the cast of One Life to Live. A former 1995 Miss Kentucky Preteen Pageant winner, Fath entered the business in 1999. She considers Storms a "frenemy" and is involved in a bi-coastal relationship with OLTL co-star John-Paul Lavoisier.
- Nadia Bjorlin – Another cast member of Days of our Lives, Bjorlin has also expanded her talents to primetime and wants to pursue a film career. She is involved in a live-in relationship with actor Brandon Beemer.
- Jenna Gering – A native of Ft. Lauderdale, Florida, Jenna has been acting on TV and film for over 15 years. She is married to Galen Gering.
- Galen Gering – Galen Gering, a former model, is another Days of Our Lives cast member. He is also an alumnus of the former NBC soap/fantasy Passions.
- John-Paul Lavoisier – Lavoisier, an alumnus of the University of the Arts in Philadelphia, entered the business in 2002 when he joined the cast of One Life to Live. He is involved in a bi-coastal dating relationship with Fath.
- Brandon Beemer – Another cast member of Days of our Lives, Beemer later became a regular on The Bold and the Beautiful. He is involved in a live-in relationship with Nadia and also wants to expand his acting resume.

== Episodes ==
No.	Title	Original release date	U.S. viewers (millions)
1	"Starting Over"	September 25, 2011	0.834
Farah decides to return to Los Angeles now that both One Life To Live and her character are history, but John-Paul doesn't want to make the move; Nadia prepares to say goodbye to Days Of Our Lives; Galen's upcoming sex scene on Days has Jenna upset; Kelly prepares for life as a single woman but Kirsten wants her to clean house first, starting with getting rid of the stuff that Kelly's ex has at her place.
2	"All My Family"	October 2, 2011	0.732
Kirsten prepares to see her brother take off for flight school; Nadia is torn between her feelings for Farah and Brandon.
3	"Guiding Fight"	October 9, 2011	1.16
Frenemies Kirsten and Farah reunite, but the feelings are far from mutual; Nadia gets a surprise birthday gift from Brandon; Jenna is afraid to leave her children behind.
4	"The Young and The Illness"	October 16, 2011	1.03
Kelly and Farah become concerned for Kirsten's health after she starts to feel ill during a photo shoot, which is also affecting Kirsten's job on the General Hospital set; Brandon pays a visit to Fashion Week, where he is asked to be a model in the Perry Ellis event; Jenna and Galen discuss whether to have another child.
5	"As the Ex Returns"	October 23, 2011	1.00
While visiting the Poconos, Kelly sees her ex there and discovers that he is drinking again; JP is grilled by both Farah and his father about marriage, resulting in Farah demanding an ultimatum; Nadia is asked to sing the National Anthem at a San Diego Padres game.
6	"One Life to Give"	October 29, 2011	1.19
Nadia hires an interior designer for a photo shoot; Farah considers becoming an egg donor for Danny; Kelly struggles to get her weight under control.
7	"Days of our Mama Drama"	November 6, 2011	1.09
Brandon pleads with Nadia to stand up to her mother; Farah's controlling nature takes its toll on her relationship with John-Paul; Kelly reconnects with an old friend.
8	"The Cold and the Beautiful"	November 13, 2011	1.17
During a camping trip, Kelly pushes Farah to confront JP, which leads to a major fight.
