= Marcie Walsh McBain =

- One Life to Live character
- Portrayed by: Kathy Brier
- Duration: 2002–2009; 2011
- First appearance: October 18, 2002
- Last appearance: November 3, 2011
- Created by: Lorraine Broderick and Christopher Whitesell
- Introduced by: Gary Tomlin (2002); Frank Valentini (2011)
- Book appearances: The Killing Club
In-universe information
- Other names: Penny Shaw; Sally Ann
- Occupation: English teacher Author
- Parents: Charlie Walsh
- Siblings: Ron Walsh; Eric Walsh; Jerry Walsh
- Spouse: Michael McBain (2006–present)
- Children: Gabriel McBain

Marcie Walsh McBain is a fictional character on the ABC soap opera, One Life to Live. The role was played by Kathy Brier from October 18, 2002 to June 17, 2009 and briefly on November 6, 12 and 13, 2009. Marcie and Michael returned on October 25, 27 and November 3, 2011.

== Storylines ==
=== Arrival ===
In 2002, Marcie Walsh befriends fellow Llanview University student Jennifer Rappaport. Desperate for Jen's approval, Marcie uses her job as receptionist at Llanview Hospital to alter test results as part of one of Jen's plans. Marcie and Jen become best friends as Jen settles down and Marcie comes into her own.

Marcie also befriends student Al Holden, and she soon discovers his drug habit. With her help, Al overcomes his addiction, and the two develop a romantic relationship. Al is diagnosed with a terminal disease in 2003, and he dies soon after. A devastated Marcie meets cocky young Dr. Michael McBain and takes an immediate dislike to him; though she is unaware, Al's soul has entered Michael's body, and seeks to reunite with her. Al/Michael helps Marcie through her pain, and when they are finally in love, Michael loses all memory of life as Al.

=== The Walshes ===
Marcie's very conservative father Charlie Walsh comes to Llanview to visit his daughter on September 29, 2004 and soon encounters his homosexual son, Eric. Charlie and Eric's relationship is strained because Charlie has never accepted his son's sexuality. This causes Marcie to continually bicker with Charlie and her older brother, Ron. Marcie publishes a mystery novel entitled The Killing Club, and in 2005 a serial killer dubbed the "Killing Club Killer" begins to mimic the murders in Marcie's book. Charlie, Ron, and Marcie are all attacked after Marcie's gas piping is intentionally loosened by the killer. They all survive; Charlie finally accepts Eric, and welcomes Eric's partner James into the family.

=== Tommy ===
Though Michael's work and Marcie's newfound fame as an author take their toll on the relationship, the couple finally marries on May 5, 2006. Marcie's father Charlie walks her down the aisle. Later that year, Michael and Marcie adopt a little boy they name Tommy, after Michael's deceased father. Marcie's friend (and Tommy's godfather) Rex Balsom soon discovers that Tommy is actually Todd Manning's son, who had been kidnapped by Dr. Spencer Truman and was presumed dead. Familiar with the McBains' devotion to Tommy and knowing that they would be devastated if he were taken away, Rex is unsure what to do; he is also aware of Todd's volatile behavior, above-the-law history and selfishness. Perceiving Todd's consideration of his missing son as nothing more than a lost possession, Rex decides to keep the secret.

Adriana and later Michael himself become part of the conspiracy to keep Tommy with the McBains, Michael deciding to protect Marcie by not telling her. Rex goes as far as faking a death certificate for Todd's missing child to get Todd to give up the search. In the wake of Spencer's murder, hints to the whereabouts of Todd's son begin to surface, prompting Todd to resume his search. Marcie finds out that she cannot have any children of her own just as the truth about Tommy's parentage comes out. Todd takes the McBains to court to win custody of his son, and both sides malign each other in a bitter battle. On October 9, 2007, Todd is awarded custody. As he arrives at the McBains' to pick up his son, Marcie escapes out a window with Tommy and flees town.

Marcie first shows up on the doorstep of her brother Ron; he gives her money, and she barely manages to escape before both Todd and FBI agent Lee Ramsey show up an Ron's door. Ron has arranged for Marcie to meet a friend of his in Decatur, Georgia; under the alias Penny Shaw, Marcie arrives at a Decatur gay bar called Faces. Ramsey appears but is distracted by the bar's employees as Marcie poses as a drag queen and performs onstage. Marcie's brother-in-law John, accompanying Todd to keep Marcie as safe as possible, spots her and starts a bar fight so she can escape. Marcie flees to New Orleans and is sheltered by Celia, the sister of one of the other drag performers. Narrowly missing discovery again by John and Todd, Marcie is referred to one of Celia's friends in Paris, Texas. A disguised Marcie walks into the Bon Jour Café, not realizing that Victoria Lord Davidson has been working there incognito to temporarily escape her life. Celia's friend having quit months earlier, Marcie befriends waitress Gigi Morasco, who believes Marcie is fleeing an abusive husband and agrees to help. Gigi soon discovers the truth, but promises not to turn Marcie in. Marcie unknowingly avoids Viki, but a worried Michael figures out where she is and the authorities follow. After a standoff with the police and FBI at the diner, Marcie surrenders; "Tommy" is returned to Todd and renamed Sam. Ultimately, Marcie does not serve any jail time.

=== Motherhood revisited ===
Todd's pregnant teenage daughter Starr Manning decides to give her unborn baby up for adoption, choosing Marcie and Michael as the adoptive parents. Michael suspects that Todd will thwart the adoption and fears that Marcie cannot survive losing another child; they separate, but Starr is determined for Marcie to adopt her baby, married or not. Starr gives birth on November 6, 2008; Todd had intended to kidnap the child and raise it himself in secret, but changes his mind at the last minute. Meanwhile, after losing her own baby in childbirth the same day, Starr's cousin Jessica Brennan — under the influence of her recurring dissociative identity disorder — switches Starr's daughter with her own deceased baby girl. The families come to believe that Starr's child, named Hope, had died. Michael and Marcie reconcile in their grief. The truth comes out and Hope is returned on June 5, 2009; Michael and Marcie finally assume custody on June 8, 2009. After overhearing Starr talking about her regrets, Marcie returns Hope to Starr to raise on June 15, 2009. Michael tells Marcie about an exciting job offer at Seattle Grace Hospital, and they decide to leave Llanview and start over. Waiting for a cab to pick them up on June 17, 2009, they are overjoyed when a home test reveals that Marcie is pregnant.

=== Return ===
Marcie makes a brief return to Llanview on November 6, 2009. She gives birth to her son with Michael, whom they name Gabriel Thomas, on November 13, 2009 in Seattle. Marcie and Michael made their return on October 25, 2011 to visit John McBain and announcing that she is pregnant with their second child.
