= Kathy Brier =

American actress and singer

- Born: March 10, 1975 (age 50); Staten Island, New York
- Occupation(s): Actress, singer
- Years active: 2002–present
- Children: 1

Kathy Brier (born March 10, 1975) is an American actress and singer, known for her work on ABC soap opera One Life to Live and the Broadway production of Hairspray.

== Early life ==
Brier grew up in Staten Island, New York, where she attended Moore Catholic High School before studying theatre and business at Wagner College, qualifying for a Bachelor of Science in arts administration.

== Career ==
Brier played the role of Marcie Walsh McBain on ABC soap opera One Life to Live from October 18, 2002, until June 17, 2009 and returned briefly in November 2009. She also returned to the role briefly in 2011, in late October and early November. In 2004 her performance earned her a nomination for a Daytime Emmy Award for "Outstanding Supporting Actress in a Drama Series."

From 2003 to 2004, Brier played the starring role of Tracy Turnblad in the Broadway production of Hairspray, having previously been the standby for Tony Award winner Marissa Jaret Winokur for six months.

Brier began acting in the theatre, with regional credits that include Fanny Brice in Funny Girl, Libby Tucker in I Oughta Be in Pictures, Joy in Cinderella, and Rizzo In Grease. Her Off-Broadway credits include Ron Taylor and Mayor Maggie in Bat Boy The Musical at Union Square Theatre, The Prince and the Pauper at The Lamb's Theatre, O'Casey Knock at The John Houseman Theatre, Tango Ballad at The Actors Studio and A Broadway Diva Christmas at the Julia Miles Theatre.

In 2010, Brier appeared on the HBO series Boardwalk Empire, episode 1.9 Belle Femme, and portrayed singer/actress, Sophie Tucker, a well-known vaudeville performer. She also sings some of the original music of the series.

== Personal life ==
Brier was married in 2010 and she and her husband had a son in 2011.

== Filmography ==
Year	Title	Role	Notes
2002–2009, 2011	One Life to Live	Marcie Walsh McBain	October 18, 2002 – June 17, 2009; November 6–13, 2009; October 25, 2011 – November 3, 2011
2003–2006	SoapTalk	Herself	August 14, 2003, March 22, 2006
2004	The Wayne Brady Show	Herself	March 24, 2004
2005	The View	Herself	February 17, 2005
2005	JoJo's Circus	Babalulu	2 episodes
2008	Law & Order: Criminal Intent	Chia Bisman	July 13, 2008
2010	Boardwalk Empire	Sophie Tucker	November 14, 2010
