= Tonja Walker =

American actress and singer (born 1960)

- Born: Huntington, West Virginia
- Other names: Tonja Davidson; Tonja Walker-Davidson
- Occupations: Actress, Singer, Producer
- Years active: 1981–present
- Relatives: Tamara Walker, sister
- Website: http://www.tonjawalker.com/

Tonja Walker is a Daytime Emmy and Tony Award nominated American actress, singer, and producer who is also a former beauty pageant titleholder who has competed in the Miss USA pageant. She is known for her role as Alex Olanov on One Life to Live and for her role as Olivia Jerome (St. John) on General Hospital.

== Career ==
Walker's first acting role was in Liar's Moon with Matt Dillon.

Walker's work has been primarily as a performer on daytime dramas. Her first daytime role was on the television serial Capitol. She played Lizbeth Bachman, a sophisticated heiress torn between playboy Jordy Clegg and handicapped doctor Thomas McCandless. Walker played the role from the show's launch until she left in 1984.

She returned to daytime as mob princess Olivia Jerome (St. John) on General Hospital from 1988 to 1990, playing a villainess complicating the lives of Duke Lavery and his family. Walker would make a 3 month return to this role in 2017.

Walker was then cast as Alex Olanov Hesser Buchanan Buchanan on One Life to Live. Alex was initially an FBI agent, but became involved with the mob. Walker had the longest run in this role, playing Alex from 1990 to 1997, with several return visits in 2001 and 2002. She made additional appearances as Alex on One Life to Live in August 2007 for the show's 9,999th and 10,000th episodes, Her character later returned again on November 2, 2007 for a brief run and again on January 2, 2009, March 15, 2011 and November 17, 2011.

Walker was nominated for a Daytime Emmy Award in 1993 for Outstanding Supporting Actress and nominated and won several Soap Opera Digest Awards including "Favorite Villainous" and "Outstanding Female Scene Stealer.

She also had recurring roles as Marie Green on Guiding Light from 2003 to 2004, where she worked with Capitol costar Marj Dusay, and as D.A. Grace Nancier on Passions, a role meant to spoof Nancy Grace.

Walker is also a singer and has released one album collection of her songs. In 2025 she released two new singles "Magic In The Moment" and "Blue Sky". She produced a film in which she also appeared, The Derby Stallion. The film starred Zac Efron, who Walker cast in his first leading role in a film, alongside Bill Cobbs, and William R. Moses and was released on video on demand and on DVD in 2007. Walker was nominated for a Tony Award as a producer for "Enchanted April" in 2003.

She's been hosting the YouTube video podcast "One Day To Love" since 2024, available also in audio form across platforms like Spotify and Apple Music.

== Personal life ==
Walker has two daughters and three stepchildren. Her two daughters are Isabella and Abrianna, who played her on-screen daughters in The Derby Stallion. Her three stepchildren are named Evan, Samantha, and Alec. All of her children use the last name Davidson.

== Filmography ==
Year	Title	Role	Notes
1981	Mr. Merlin	Jessie Taylor	
1982-84	Capitol	Lizbeth Bachman	4 episodes
1982	Liar's Moon	Karen Covucci	
1983	Making of a Male Model	Alma Rockwell	
1985	Hunter	Claire Jorgensen	S2.E4 - "Rich Girl"
1986	T. J. Hooker	Nancy Bosca	S5.E16 - "Blood Sport"
1987	Kidnapped	Claudia	
1987	Spies	Lana	
1988–90	General Hospital	Olivia St. John	129 episodes
1990-2011	One Life to Live	Alex Olanov	54 episodes
1994	Clear Cut		short
2003-04	Guiding Light	Marie Green	3 episodes
2005-07	Passions	Grace Nancier	13 episodes
2007	The Derby Stallion	Linda McCardle	co-producer
2011	Spy	Yvonne Hayworth	
2012	Excuse Me for Living	Elaine	
2014	My Dog the Space Traveler	Pearl Otto	
2014	Tainted Dreams	Tina Scott	
2016	Exiled Out East	Lynette Cooke	
2024	Last Culprit	Tracy	
2024	Destination Heaven	Denice	S1.E2 - "I Will Follow Him"
