= Rex Balsom =

Fictional character from One Life to Live

- One Life to Live character
- Portrayed by: John-Paul Lavoisier
- Duration: 2002–12
- First appearance: May 9, 2002
- Last appearance: January 12, 2012
- Created by: Lorraine Broderick; Christopher Whitesell
- Introduced by: Gary Tomlin
In-universe information
- Occupation: Private investigator; Nightclub Owner; Businessman; Bellhop; Con artist
- Family: Buchanan
- Parents: Clint Buchanan; Echo DiSavoy
- Adoptive parents: Walter Balsom (foster); Roxy Balsom (foster)
- Stepmother: Nora Hanen (2009–10); Kimberly Andrews (2010); Victoria Lord (2013–)
- Half-brothers: Cord Roberts; Kevin Buchanan (adoptive); Joey Buchanan (adoptive); Schuyler Joplin (adoptive)
- Half-sisters: Jessica Buchanan; Natalie Buchanan
- Wife: Jen Rappaport (2003); Adriana Cramer (2008); Gigi Morasco (2011–)
- Sons: Shane Morasco
- Grandfathers: Asa Buchanan; Arthur Stanford
- Grandmothers: Olympia Buchanan; Giselle French; Stella Lipschitz (foster)
- Uncles: Bo Buchanan; Ben Davidson; Giles Morgan
- Aunts: Corrine Balsom (foster)
- Nephews: C. J. Roberts; Ryder Ford; Liam McBain
- Nieces: Sarah Roberts; Bree Brennan
- First cousins: David Vickers; Drew Buchanan; Matthew Buchanan

Rex Balsom is a fictional character from the American daytime drama One Life to Live, portrayed by John-Paul Lavoisier from May 9, 2002, to the show's finale on January 12, 2012.

== Casting and characterization ==
With the character named "Jamie" prior to production, then-Executive Producer Gary Tomlin "toyed with the idea" of putting Rex in a gay storyline and Lavoisier stated in Soap Opera Digest in 2003: "I was asked by the higher powers at the show how I would feel about doing something like that. I said, 'Absolutely, any plot you want to give me, I'll take on strong.' And they said, 'Okay, we just wanted to check.'" However, this idea never realized, with the character repeatedly paired with women. Calling Rex a "heterosexual horndog," Lavoisier noted he "added a glint in [Rex's] eye he'd lifted from Ryan Phillippe's ... Cruel Intentions character of Sebastian. 'They said, "Sure, go with that. Start with that." And that was pretty much it.'"

== Storylines ==
Believing Roxy Balsom to be her biological mother, Jessica Buchanan travels to Michigan in 2002 to meet Roxy's son, Rex. Rex soon comes to Llanview to take advantage of the fact that Jessica is a member of a wealthy family. Raised by his father's sister, Corinne Balsom, Rex has an uneasy relationship with Roxy. It is ultimately revealed that Jessica and Natalie are actually fraternal twins and both the daughters of Victoria Lord Davidson. Rex has remained close to Natalie, the sister he grew up with, and maintains a friendship with Jessica.

Rex becomes involved with Jennifer Rappaport. Torn between Rex and Joey Buchanan, Jen first elopes with Rex in the summer of 2003, but then quickly divorces in order to marry Joey in August. Jen has an affair with Rex, and when the truth comes out, Jen and Joey divorce. Rex is later devastated when Jen is murdered by Daniel Colson and Rex discovers Jen's body.

Rex becomes a bit more respectable by taking over management of R.J. Gannon's nightclub, Ultra Violet. Rex parlays his street smarts and shady connections into a sideline career as an amateur private investigator. In occasionally aiding the police, Rex develops a friendship with Police Commissioner Bo Buchanan, who is constantly frustrated by Rex's mischief and methods, but cares about him like a son.

In 2006, Rex becomes romantically involved with Adriana Cramer, whose mother Dorian Lord disapproves of the match and goes to great lengths to keep them apart.

Jen's murder in 2005 had cemented Rex's closeness to Jen's best friend, Marcie Walsh. While searching for Todd Manning's son, Rex discovers that the child is actually Tommy, the adopted son of Marcie and Michael McBain. Knowing that they would be devastated if he were taken away, Rex decides to keep the secret. Spencer Truman is soon murdered and Bo catches Rex holding the murder weapon. Rex is exonerated, but Bo suspects that he is keeping something from him. In the wake of Spencer's death, hints to the whereabouts of Todd's son begin to surface, prompting Todd to resume his search. Miles Laurence gives Todd proof that Spencer had orchestrated the adoption of Todd's son by the McBains.

Todd is awarded custody of his son, but Marcie flees with Tommy. The search leads Rex to Paris, Texas, where he runs into Gigi Morasco, his high school girlfriend. Rex apologizes for his sudden disappearance from her life in 2002 when he left for Llanview. Gigi lies about any knowledge of Marcie’s whereabouts. Agreeing with Rex that "it is a terrible thing for a father to not have the opportunity to watch his son grow up," Gigi says she has something to tell him. But she holds back as Rex mentions his plans to propose to Adriana. With Marcie anxious to raise cash to leave the country, Gigi sells Rex Marcie's engagement ring. Rex returns to Llanview and proposes to Adriana; she accepts, but Michael recognizes Marcie's ring. He rushes to Texas, bringing Todd and the authorities with him.

In early 2008, Rex and Adriana meet Charlie Banks. Charlie, who is hiding his identity in order to conceal his relationship to his son, Jared Banks, glances idly at Roxy's business card and introduces himself as "Charlie Balsom." Rex inquires as to whether he and Charlie are related, but Charlie insists they aren't. Rex remains curious about his lineage, first asking Roxy, then his Aunt Corinne, about Walter Balsom's side of the family. Both women are evasive and nervous, and Rex becomes convinced that they are hiding something. When Corinne visits Llanview to congratulate Rex on his engagement, she admits that she doubts that Walter Balsom was Rex's father.

To stop Rex from looking further, Roxy claims that Charlie Banks is his father. She begs Charlie to go along with the story. He agrees, and reluctantly lets Rex start building a relationship with him. The truth eventually comes out, and though Rex is hurt and furious, Roxy evades his questions about his real father. Rex and Natalie learn that not only is Mitch Laurence not Rex's father, but that Roxy isn't his mother. Allison Perkins switched Rex at birth with Roxy and Mitch's real son, Schuyler Joplin. Believing that Roxy's baby (Schuyler) was going to die, Allison took an infant abandoned at the hospital (Rex) and passed that baby off as Mitch's son. However, when Allison discovered that Mitch's child would be fine, she told her sister, Dr. Leah Joplin, that it was her baby, but that she didn't want it and allowed Dr. Joplin to raise the child as her own.

Meanwhile, Gigi has come to Llanview. Adriana discovers Shane's existence and suspects that he is Rex's son. Gigi confirms that Shane's father, Brody Lovett, is a deceased Navy SEAL. Gigi is troubled as Rex begins getting closer to Shane. With Gigi a constant presence and Rex getting closer to Shane, Adriana seeks to find some leverage against Gigi. She discovers that Brody is alive, and he confirms that Gigi had been pregnant when he met her. Adriana brings him to Llanview. Rex and Adriana marry, but soon separate when Rex discovers her machinations. When Gigi leaves town to follow Rex to Texas, Brody uses Rex's DNA from a toothbrush to fake a paternity test which "proves" Brody to be Shane's father. Gigi and Rex eventually return to Llanview together, with Rex knowing the truth about Shane's paternity. Brody suffers a mental breakdown, kidnapping Shane and accidentally shooting Rex. Adriana returns and keeps Gigi from seeing Rex, who is in a coma. When Rex awakens, Adriana finally accepts his feelings for Gigi, and lets Rex go for good. With Brody suffering from post-traumatic stress disorder, Rex decides not to press charges. Initially resentful of Rex, Shane comes to appreciate his newly-found father.

Roxy finally admits to Rex that his father is dead, and that she killed him in self-defense. Roxy subsequently visits an unseen, comatose man in a hospital, whom she identifies as Rex's father. She vows to keep the secret forever and leaves. Shane is diagnosed with leukemia, and Roxy discovers that Rex's comatose father is a bone marrow match. Gigi's estranged sister, Stacy Morasco, blackmails Roxy into helping her pretend to be the donor. Armed with a spare bag of his blood in case Shane needs it, Roxy pulls the plug on Rex's father; he survives and is spirited away by a nurse who tells Roxy that he is dead. Gigi is eventually able to prove that Stacy is not a bone marrow match, and Gigi and Rex secretly reunite. However, Stacy finds out that she is pregnant, having slept with Rex weeks earlier. She loses the baby, but gets pregnant again by Oliver Fish and passes it off as Rex's. Rex's Aunt Corinne gives him a copy of his birth certificate, revealing Mitch Laurence to be his father; Roxy confirms it. Rex discovers that Stacy's child is not his. Meanwhile, Gigi helps Stacy give birth to a baby girl she names Sierra Rose. Stacy falls through the ice of a frozen lake and, despite Rex and Oliver's attempts to save her, she is presumed dead.

Viki hires Rex to investigate Echo DiSavoy, who has returned to Llanview. Echo later confronts Clint Buchanan and declares that they are Rex's biological parents. Clint reveals that he has known about Rex for quite some time. Clint dislikes Rex, whom he considers a "gold-digging piece of trash", like Echo. Echo is wracked by guilt over abandoning Rex and she publicly reveals that she is Rex's mother. She names Charlie as the father in order to protect Rex from Clint's wrath. Rex allows Echo to begin spending more time with his family. At Jessica and Natalie's double wedding, Vimal Patel shocks everyone by revealing that Clint is Rex's father, and that Clint had paid him to tamper with the paternity test. Rex and Charlie are devastated.

Rex asks Gigi to marry him and she says yes. However, before they can marry, Gigi is left brain dead from carbon monoxide poisoning when she stumbled into a trap set by Jack Manning. Rex agrees to give Gigi's heart to Clint, who had suffered a heart attack, in exchange for all of his assets. Rex also moves into the Buchanan Mansion, which he took ownership of as part of Clint's assets, along with Shane and Echo.

Rex later confides to Echo that he has been seeing Gigi as a ghost and believes that she may still be alive. Natalie hires psychic, Madame Delphina, to help Rex contact Gigi's spirit. Madame Delphina gives Rex a cryptic clue, which leads him to a strip club in Kentucky. Rex and Natalie go to investigate. Rex hears an announcement for a stripper going by the name of "Gigi". It turns out that "Gigi" is the name being used by Kimberly Andrews, who was a friend Stacy. Rex confronts Kim and asks her why she is using his late fiancée’s name. Kim says that she is paying respects to Stacy, who had used the name "Gigi" as a stripper in Las Vegas. Rex tells Kim that Gigi may still be alive, and that he is Clint's biological son, having extorted the entire Buchanan fortune away from Clint in exchange for Gigi's heart. Rex returns home with Natalie. After Rex leaves, Kim goes to the hospital to visit a mysterious comatose woman. Kim tells the woman that Rex visited her and that Rex is looking for Gigi. The woman is soon revealed to be Stacy.

Rex decides to return everything to Clint as a way of his moving on with his life. However, Clint officially acknowledges both Rex and Shane as his family and says that they have a right to live in the family home. Rex is visited by Cutter Wentworth, who tells Rex that Gigi is still alive and he will return her to him in exchange for the Buchanan fortune. Rex and Shane visit Gigi's grave to pay their respects, where Stacy, who has had plastic surgery in order to look like Gigi, is hiding.

Rex later goes back to The Bon Jour Café where he meets "Stacy", unaware that she's really Gigi. Rex scolds "Stacy" for getting plastic surgery to look like Gigi. "Stacy" tells Rex that she is really Gigi, but that she doesn't remember anything about her old self, and is trying to get her memories back. Cutter tells Rex that "Stacy" is really Gigi, and that it was Stacy who had plastic surgery to look like Gigi. Professor Delbet Fina Jr. arrives at the diner to help Rex and "Stacy" with answers about the night of Gigi's death. It is revealed that "Stacy" is actually Gigi. It was Stacy who died from carbon monoxide poisoning, but was mistakenly identified as Gigi. Rex also tells Gigi that Stacy's heart was donated to Clint after his heart attack. Rex comes back home to Llanview to surprise Shane with his mother, explaining to him that Stacy, not Gigi, was the one who had died.

On New Year's Eve 2011, Rex and Gigi are married at Llanfair.

In January 2012, Gigi, Rex, and Shane decide to move to England so that Shane can attend an art school. They say good-bye to their friends and family before leaving Llanview to move to England.

== Reception ==
In 2024, Charlie Mason from Soaps She Knows called Natalie and Rex "screwed-up individuals", which he blamed on Roxy's parenting.

== See also ==
- Buchanan family
