= Greg Evans (One Life to Live) =

Fictional soap opera character

- One Life to Live character
- Portrayed by: Terrell Tilford
- Duration: 2009–10
- First appearance: June 23, 2009
- Last appearance: November 17, 2010
- Created by: Ron Carlivati
- Introduced by: Frank Valentini
In-universe information
- Occupation: Neurosurgeon at Llanview Hospital
- Parents: Richard Evans; Phylicia Evans
- Brothers: Shaun Evans
- Daughters: Destiny Evans
- Grandsons: Drew Buchanan II
- Grandfathers: Fred Wenton

Greg Evans is a fictional character from the ABC soap opera One Life to Live. The role was originated onscreen by actor Terrell Tilford June 23, 2009, who appeared through November 17, 2010.

== Storylines ==
Renowned neurosurgeon Dr. Greg Evans (Tilford) arrives in fictional Llanview in June 2009 at the request of Clint Buchanan (Jerry verDorn) for a paid consult on performing spinal surgery on his nephew Matthew (Eddie Alderson). Months earlier, Greg's younger sister Destiny (Shenell Edmonds) asked for a favor to help Matthew, and when Greg arrives, Destiny comes to realize Greg returned home from his successful career abroad because of Clint's check and not Destiny's letters.

Matthew's parents Bo (Robert S. Woods and Nora Buchanan refuse to allow the surgery on minor Matthew, and Greg proceeds to leave town before being guilted to stay by his brother Shaun (Sean Ringgold) and Shaun's girlfriend and Matthew's sister Rachel Gannon (Daphnee Duplaix). Matthew successfully sues his parents for the right to authorize surgery, and Greg tell Matthew that he would testify on his behalf, angering Matthew's Rachel.

Greg and Rachel kiss after Greg testifies in court for Matthew, and Rachel decides to break up with Shaun. Before Rachel tells Shaun, he is shot in the head on bodyguard duty for the Cramer family. Greg performs successful trauma surgery on Shaun, who goes into a brief coma. After tests, Greg determines he left a bullet fragment lodged in his brain. Devastated, Greg vows to never perform surgery again and recommends Matthew to a Seattle-based surgeon. Matthew soon agrees when Greg agrees to supervise the procedure.

Greg prepares to leave for Seattle to observe the surgery with Rachel in tow, angering his mother Phylicia who was aware of Greg's affair with his brother's girlfriend. After Mrs. Evans confronts Rachel, she goes on a date with Shaun where she reveals herself not to be in love with him. Shaun senses the bond between Rachel and Greg and asks if they are romantically involved, a question Rachel dodges. Later, Rachel tells Greg she did not want to pursue a relationship with Greg for fear of hurting Shaun. Shaun sees them kiss and lashes out at them, warning Rachel that Greg would eventually bore of her and move on to the next woman. After much begging from Destiny, Shaun asks Greg as a brother to perform help in Matthew's surgery, and he obliges.

Rachel moves into an apartment with her social worker colleague Schuyler Joplin (Scott Clifton), a move with leaves Greg jealous. When a bottle of Oxytocin goes lost at Llanview Hospital, Greg tells Rachel, who insists on Schuyler's innocence. Greg and Rachel soon break it off after Rachel relentlessly defends Schuyler, and she leaves Llanview for Chicago.

Téa Delgado (Florencia Lozano) soon finds herself in Greg's care after fainting in court, and Greg diagnoses her with a brain tumor. Greg and Téa proceed for months with chemotherapy but to no avail. As Téa's mental condition apparently deteriorates, Greg suggests Téa die in privacy at a hospice in St. Kitts. It soon becomes clear Téa was not suffering a brain tumor but that Greg drugged her after being ordered in a blackmail by Elijah "Eli" Clarke (Matt Walton) to do so and kill her.

Todd (Trevor St. John) and Téa's daughter Danielle Manning, arrive to see their dying loved one only for Greg to tell them she'd already died. Feeling guilty, Greg reveals he moved Téa to a clinic in Cherryvale, Pennsylvania to hide her from Eli. After Téa awakes from an induced coma, Greg lies and tells Téa she had been miraculously cured. Greg soon returns to St. Kitts greeted by Eli, who he finds him unconscious with a pool of blood beneath his head.

Attempting to perform surgery on Eli, who wakes up and refuses treatment. Greg then proceeded to inject an Eli with a lethal dose of morphine, however Greg mistakenly receives the dose instead and is rushed back to Llanview in a coma. Eli became aware that Greg had survived and attempted to kill him by drugging him but is stopped by Dr. Vivian Wright (Kearran Giovanni). Wanting to come clean, Greg reveals to his parents his desire to truth to reveal Destiny's paternity to her and Shaun.

As they all stood together, Greg's parents Phylicia and Richard Evans (Frankie Faison) revealed her to be Greg's daughter. They soon divulge backstory that after Greg began medical school, he had gotten a girl named Charlene pregnant, but he did not want the child, so Phylicia and Richard agreed to raise Destiny as their own child. At the time of conception, Charlene was Shaun's girlfriend and it is uncovered Greg killed Charlene after a confrontation, disposing of the body.

Greg soon reveals this truth to an upset Destiny. With help from Nora, Greg receives a sentence of six years in Statesville Prison for Charlene's murder, apologizing to Destiny as he is led to the lockup November 29, 2011.
