= Franco (General Hospital) =

Fictional character

- General Hospital character
- Roger Howarth as Franco
- Portrayed by: James Franco (2009–2012); Roger Howarth (2013–2021)
- Duration: 2009–2021
- First appearance: November 19, 2009
- Last appearance: March 11, 2021
- Created by: Robert Guza, Jr., James Franco and John Carter
- Introduced by: Jill Farren Phelps (2009); Frank Valentini (2013)
- Spin-off appearances: General Hospital: Night Shift
In-universe information
- Other names: Franco Baldwin; Franco Quartermaine (2013); Jason Morgan (2013); Drew Cain (2019); Robert James Frank
- Occupation: Art therapist (2014–2021); Multi-media artist
- Family: Baldwin
- Parents: Scott Baldwin; Heather Webber
- Adoptive mother: Betsy Frank
- Brothers: Drew Cain (foster)
- Half-brothers: Steven Webber; Logan Hayes
- Half-sisters: Esme Prince; Karen Wexler; Serena Baldwin; Christina Baldwin (adoptive)
- Spouse: Elizabeth Webber (2019–2021)
- Stepchildren: Cameron Spencer; Jake Spencer; Aiden Spencer
- Grandparents: David Bordisso; Lee Baldwin (adoptive); Meg Bentley; Alice Grant
- Nieces and nephews: Ace Prince-Cassadine
- Other relatives: Susan Moore; Jason Morgan; Drew Cain; Jake Webber

Franco Baldwin is a fictional character from General Hospital, an American soap opera on the ABC network. James Franco originated the character in November 2009, after seeking out a soap opera role. He continued to portray the character in intermittent guest stints through January 2012. The character of Franco is a multi-media artist and serial killer who becomes fixated on Jason Morgan (Steve Burton), a known hitman. Franco terrorizes Jason, along with his friends and family. Jason supposedly kills Franco in January 2012, after Franco allegedly rapes Jason's wife Sam (Kelly Monaco). The character is mentioned often after his alleged death, and for a time it was believed that he was Jason's twin brother. In May 2013, Roger Howarth assumed the role when the character was revealed to be alive. Franco's return brought about the revelation that his biological parents are Scott Baldwin (Kin Shriner) and Heather Webber (Robin Mattson). In March 2021, the character was written off after being fatally shot by Peter August (Wes Ramsey).

James Franco's casting on General Hospital was met by surprise and mixed reviews. Franco also used his time on the series to create a documentary that was shown at the Tribeca Film Festival, and turned a scene filming at MOCA into a live performance piece. The attention Franco garnered boosted publicity for General Hospital and the soap opera genre.

== Casting and creation ==
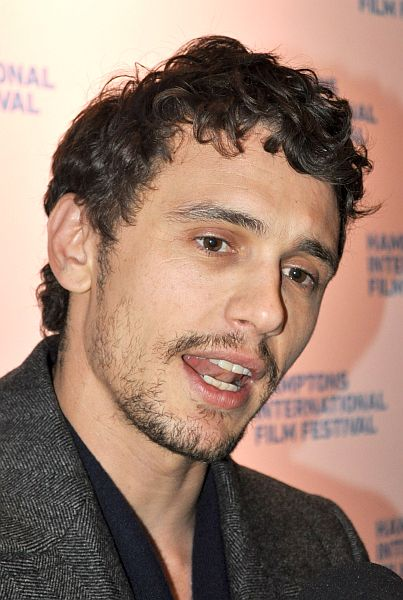
Actor James Franco created the role, alongside writers Robert Guza, Jr. and John Carter.

In 2009, James Franco sought out a soap opera role. Sharing the same agent as Steve Burton, who played Jason Morgan on General Hospital, he went to that series for his request. Franco signed on for a series of 20 episodes that he filmed in three days. He was credited as a special guest star, and first appeared on November 19, 2009. His scenes aired through February 2010. He returned on June 30, 2010, for a summer-long storyline. He next appeared on February 25 and February 28, 2011, bookending his co-hosting job of the 83rd Academy Awards. Franco returned for a longterm stint on September 20, 2011, that aired until January 13, 2012.

“Franco is an artist who works with death. He works in a lot of different ways. He does graffiti, performances, photographs. He creates installations based on murder scenes featuring murders he possibly was involved with. He's interested in pushing the boundaries of art – both aesthetically and ethically – and he will go way too far."

— Franco in 2010, on his character

James Franco recalled approaching General Hospital in an interview with The New Yorker: "I wanted their full treatment, so all I said was that I wanted to be an artist and I wanted my character to be crazy." Franco's friend and colleague Carter, a conceptual artist who Franco was collaborating with on the film Maladies, had suggested that Franco take a soap opera role and play an artist. They would use the material in the film, where Franco plays a former soap opera star. The General Hospital writing staff created the rest of the character, who they named "Franco, just Franco." Executive producer at the time Jill Farren Phelps stated, "He’s an unusual character and he has an unusual goal", promising his primary story arc would involve character Jason Morgan. The series promoted the character as "an artist whose canvas is murder". Ken Tucker of Entertainment Weekly compared the characters art installations to a rip off of Jean-Michel Basquiat and Keith Haring. Franco is revealed to be a serial killer and a sociopath, whose vendetta against Jason that becomes an obsession. Michael Logan of TV Guide called Franco's fascination of Jason an "ongoing man-crush." James Franco explained to TV Guide: "Jason is a master assassin who's murdered a lot of people and gotten away with it, which is very attractive to Franco. He likes that danger. (Long thoughtful pause) There's an underlying sexiness to that....if that's what you're getting at. Yes, there's a underlying sexiness to that connection."

In May 2013, Roger Howarth—who previously appeared as his One Life to Live character Todd Manning—was cast as Franco. With Howarth's casting, several scenes were re-shot; his casting also marked the first time the character would appear in a regular capacity. On March 9, 2021, it was announced Howarth departed General Hospital as Franco, however, would return at a later date as another character. Franco made his last appearance on March 11.

== Storylines ==
In November 2009, Franco witnesses the cover up of Michael Corinthos (then Drew Garrett)'s accidental murder of his stepmother, and sends reenactment photos to Michael's uncle Jason Morgan (Steve Burton). Disguised as a homeless vagrant, he spray paints the phrase CO77X around Port Charles. He witnesses a shootout involving Jason and Joey Limbo (Sal Landi), afterwards killing Limbo and repositioning the body in an odd figure. He goes to the opening of his art exhibit, consisting of numerous crime scene reenactments. He asks to meet Jason, who refuses. Maxie Jones (Kirsten Storms) accompanies Franco to his apartment, where he blindfolds her, photographs her in a chalk outline, and they sleep together. Franco invites Jason to his apartment and says he idolizes Jason's work in organized crime, calling it "art". He tells Jason that they are the same, and is upset when Jason does not agree. Franco hits police officer Ronnie Dimestico (Ronnie Marmo) with a car and tells him to give Jason the message "you choose". Franco kidnaps Jason's girlfriend Sam McCall (Kelly Monaco) and his best friend Carly Corinthos Jacks (Laura Wright). Jason saves Carly, but Franco escapes before Jason can follow him. Franco goes to find Maxie, and kidnaps Lulu Spencer (Julie Marie Berman) instead. He holds Lulu and Sam captive above bomb timers on opposite sides of town. Jason races to Sam while Dante Falconeri (Dominic Zamprogna) goes to Lulu. Sam's bomb turns out to be fake, while Dante reaches Lulu just in time to save her before her bomb explodes. Franco leaves town, later sending a DVD to Carly's daughter Josslyn Jacks as a christening present. The video explains his past motivations and reminds Jason he plans to kill someone for every person Jason kills.

In June, Jason kills Carter (Josh Wingate), who had abused Michael (now Chad Duell) in prison, and his last words are "Franco says hi." In July, Franco dresses as a homeless person and follows Jason home. Dante and Jason continue to investigate Franco, finding his real name to be Robert Frank. They track down his mother, played by James Franco's real-life mother Betsy Franco. The character has changed her name from Betsy Frank to Karen Anderson, and denies that she has a son. Franco leaves clues that lead Jason and Dante to Franco's exhibit in Los Angeles, held at MOCA. Based on his exploits in Port Charles, the exhibit is titled "Francophrenia: Dissolving the Boundary Between Illusion and Reality". Jason and Dante meanwhile discover a DVD that reveals Franco had paid Carter to attack Michael in prison. In an ensuing battle with Jason, Franco apparently jumps off the roof of the building, although the crowd brushes it off as live entertainment. Meanwhile, Franco is suspected of kidnapping Elizabeth Webber (Rebecca Herbst)'s newborn son Aiden, and is seen giving Aiden to Franco's mother to raise. Lucky Spencer (Jonathan Jackson) is able to reclaim the child without incident. As he leaves town, Franco is seen requesting his agent to book international model Brenda Barrett (Vanessa Marcil), who later turns down the offer. In February 2011, Franco calls Jason and takes credit for the bombing of Brenda and Sonny Corinthos (Maurice Benard)'s wedding limo. In March, Carly receives a video where Franco says he will keep a close eye on Josslyn.

In September, Franco is seen taking photos and telling his toy monkey that Jason and Sam forgot his invitation to their wedding. He sets up cameras around the church and replaces Sam's wedding dress. During the reception, Franco watches from his apartment and dances with the dress. He sets up cameras in their honeymoon cabin in Hawaii. Carly finds a package to Josslyn from Hawaii with a note from Franco, and goes to warn Jason. She leaves after Jason hears that Franco is in Toronto, who is then seen at the cabin. Jason and Sam separately return and each find a note and bottle of beer laced by Franco that they drink. Jason wakes up in a locked room, with a TV screen that shows live footage of Franco carrying Sam, passed out, to the bedroom. He taunts Jason about privacy and covers the camera. When Jason is released, he goes to Sam, who faintly remembers being in bed with someone, leading them to believe Franco raped her. Franco sends Josslyn a wind-up baby toy and a video where he promises he will always be there for her. Sam sees Franco's signature NO2CCAH5 recently spray painted in an alley, and their friend Damian Spinelli (Bradford Anderson) believes the last character is symbol meaning 'creation', possibly referencing something Franco created during their honeymoon. Franco adds a zero, which they interpret to mean that there is no beginning and no end to Franco's game. Sam and Michael find a DVD where Franco taunts Jason, saying they are going to be a father. Sam finds out she is pregnant, and has a paternity test that shows Jason as the father. Jason shoots Franco, and as he dies, he says that Jason will never know. Sam finds another DVD from Franco that shows a home video of a baby boy. She goes to see Heather Webber (Robin Mattson), who reveals that her deceased cousin, Susan Moore (Gail Ramsey), was Franco's biological mother, making him Jason's fraternal twin brother. Susan had never known about the baby because Heather sold Franco to Susan's nurse, Betsy Frank. Sam has another test done that shows Franco as the father of her baby, which causes tension between her and Jason. It is later revealed that Heather switched the paternity test and Jason is the father.

In May 2013, Franco (Roger Howarth) gathers Jason's friends at the Haunted Star and reveals himself to be alive. He then admits that he only led Jason to believe he raped Sam, by showing a DVD of what really happened that night. He also reveals with another DVD that he only instructed Carter to protect Michael, not hurt him in any way. Carter's assault of Michael was completely separate from Franco's agenda. After being arrested, Franco gets out on a bail where he makes himself known to the Quartermaine family and connects with his presumed daughter Kiki Jerome (Kristen Alderson) and her mother Ava Jerome (Maura West). Sonny orders Shawn Butler (Sean Blakemore) to perform a hit, but calls it off for fear of innocent people being harmed. Carly lures Franco to the Metro Court and orders Shawn to perform the hit, making him believe it is with Sonny's approval. Shawn fails to kill Franco and Olivia Falconeri (Lisa LoCicero) is shot instead, though this is revealed to have been due to a shot fired by Ava who was also trying to kill Franco at the same time. When Sonny's son Morgan Corinthos (Bryan Craig) begins living with Kiki at the Quartermaine mansion, Sonny and Shawn beat up Franco to warn him away from Morgan. Alexis Davis (Nancy Lee Grahn), looking for Franco because he is a prospective bone marrow donor for Sam's son Danny, comes upon the scene and takes Franco to General Hospital. Having lost consciousness, Franco wakes up in a hospital bed believing himself to be Jason and abducts Danny to protect him from "Franco", later confronting Sam who he believes has been tricked by "Franco" to not recognize him as Jason. It is revealed Franco has a brain tumor that has been altering his personality for years. After having a duel with a delusion of himself, Franco is prepared to kill himself and Danny to save them from what he comes to believe are innately violent tendencies, but Carly convinces him to return Danny and go back to the hospital. His tumor is found to be benign and removed, but due to some cancerous cells he cannot donate bone marrow to Danny after his struggle with Epiphany Johnson (Sonya Eddy). While he is sleeping in recovery, it is found that Kiki is not his daughter. In November 2013, Heather reveals that she is Franco's biological mother and Scott Baldwin (Kin Shriner) is his father. Not too long after, Franco begins a secret relationship with Carly Jacks.

In December, Franco stabbed his mother during a struggle, after he found her about to kill Carly in his apartment. Franco buried Heather, but it was later discovered that she was alive. Later, Heather kidnapped Carly in another attempt to keep them apart.

Carly is eventually rescued, thanks to intervention from Franco and the police. Since then, Franco has been plagued by jealousy over the connection between Carly and Sonny. It turns out this jealousy, fueled by Franco's new friend and Silas Clay (Michael Easton)'s wife Nina Clay (Michelle Stafford) is "correct", as Kiki informs Franco that Carly slept with Sonny behind his back after he was employed as Art therapist at General Hospital by Chief of Staff and Nina's Aunt Liesl Obrecht (Kathleen Gati). At his birthday party, Franco shocks everyone by proposing to Carly, and he suggests a Halloween 2014 date for the wedding, with it becoming plainly evident that he intends to exact revenge against Sonny and Carly. After exposing Sonny for killing A.J. at the wedding, he trapped Heather, Shawn, Carly, and Jordon in a warehouse and claimed that the door was rigged with a bomb. Although, it wasn't, he used the time to escape with Nina and the baby she had just kidnapped. After being on the run for a short time they were captured. While Nina was sent to Shadybrooke, Franco was sent to prison to await trial for his many crimes. In prison he participated in an escape with Ava, Sonny, and Julian. Franco made it to Shadybrooke in time to save Nina from Heather and injected himself with an overdose of LSD to stay at Shadybrooke with Nina. He survived the overdose, but continues to have trouble with hallucinations.

In March 2021, Franco is shot and killed by Peter August (Wes Ramsey).

== Reception ==
=== Casting ===
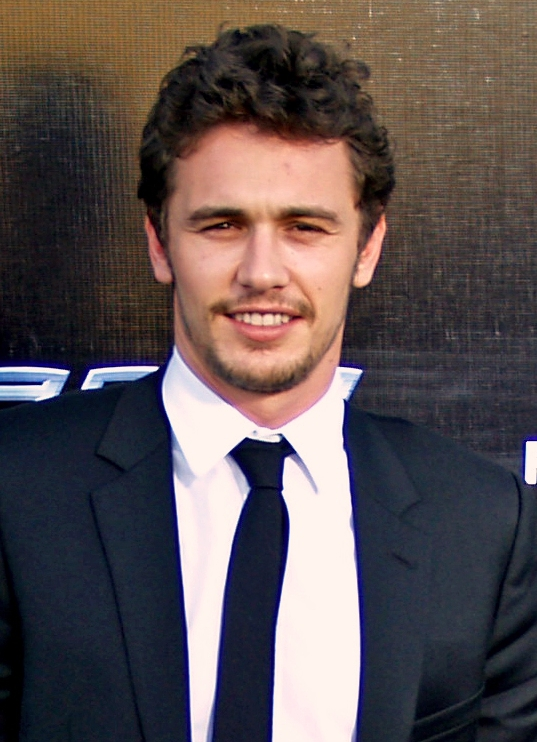
James Franco's guest-starring role as Franco brought positive reception in the press.

“I disrupted the audience's suspension of disbelief, because no matter how far I got into the character, I was going to be perceived as something that doesn't belong to the incredibly stylized world of soap operas. Everyone watching would see an actor they recognized, a real person in a made-up world."

— Franco, in 2009

The announcement of James Franco's casting on General Hospital was met by surprise. Some critics felt Franco's appearance was a satire on the soap opera genre. Vulture writers Jada Yuan called it "bizarre but fascinating", and Lane Brown stated "the answer was either a drinking problem or a maniacal desire to be written about on more blogs." Michelle Kung of The Wall Street Journal wrote in 2009: "Fans were puzzled. Had he lost a bet? Was this an elaborate prank? Was he a closet Luke and Laura junkie?" Some critics expressed the role would be detrimental to Franco's career. Others felt it was a smart move that would benefit Franco with publicity; New York Magazine wrote: "Joining General Hospital, and acting like it's just another gig, displays a ballsy disregard for conventional Hollywood wisdom, and adds a line to his résumé that has already generated more discussion than all the Spider-Man movies combined. For any ridicule Franco may get, he's created twice as much intrigue." Kung interviewed executive producer Phelps who explained: "We all had the same reaction of 'Really? Are you kidding?' (...) But we made the plane reservation and he showed up – and could not have been nicer or more humble; he was willing to do whatever we asked."

The reception of Franco's guest stints was mixed. Ratings from young woman viewers increased only five percent, the category that had been expected to rise the most. Roberta Smith of The New York Times stated: "[Franco's appearances] earned him something of a cult following, although I can’t be alone in feeling that their irony is outdone by their lameness." Other viewers positively received Franco's character. The New Yorker magazine called their July 2010 article "Francophenia" one of the top ten highlights of 2010. Willa Paskin of Vulture stated Franco was snubbed to not have been nominated at the 2010 Daytime Emmy Awards. Mickey O'Connor of TV Guide named Franco's 2010 return "Best Weirdness" in his Top Moments column.

=== Popular culture ===
The character Franco's 2010 exhibit at MOCA coincided with James Franco's real life exhibit at MOCA scheduled that summer, presenting his video documentary on his time at General Hospital. Before becoming the director at MOCA, Jeffrey Deitch had been approached by Franco to use his New York gallery Deitch Projects, but Deitch was closing the gallery to assume his role at MOCA. Deitch offered the use of MOCA, despite hesitation from some of his colleagues. Randy Kennedy of The New York Times spoke of Deitch and the General Hospital filming at MOCA in tandem: "That the museum had become a soap opera set was pure Deitch, for better or worse: stuntlike, crazily experimental, scrambling high and low culture, risking ridicule and seeming not to care much when it rains down on his head." Deitch made a small cameo appearance during the filming, as the director of Franco's exhibit. In an interview with the Los Angeles Times Deitch compared Franco's appearances on the series to "the ultimate extension of Andy Warhol guest starring in The Love Boat." The filming at MOCA was simultaneously called a performance piece for the museum, titled: SOAP at MOCA: James Franco on General Hospital. Franco described: "Soap at MOCA is an attempt to both blur and define the lines between different disciplines, between life and art, between art and popular culture, and between representations of the self as both performative character and as non-performative self." The series won Daytime Emmy Awards for the episode filmed at MOCA, although it received mixed reactions from viewers.

James Franco's real-life documentary/fiction feature Francophenia (or Don't Kill Me, I Know Where the Baby Is) was shown at the 2012 Tribeca Film Festival, described as "an experimental psychological thriller set amid the spectacle of a celebrity’s escalating paranoia". Genna Terranova, Tribeca's director of programming, commented: "He's kind of constructed this really interesting and well-crafted film about that experience that plays with the boundaries of documentary. It's a bit tongue in cheek, as James himself can be. He's a bit enigmatic and the film is as well.”

=== Impact ===
“James Franco's guest stint – or metaphysical investigation into the hall-of-mirrors recursion of celebrity, take your pick – on General Hospital was one of the few times in recent history that daytime television broke out into mainstream discussion, and it's hard to argue that the spotlight wasn't a boo[n] for the genre."

— Keith Staskiewicz of Entertainment Weekly

Franco joined General Hospital during a time of declining ratings for all soap operas. Franco was published in The Wall Street Journal, where he explained his use of the experience as an experiment in performance art and stated: "My hope was for people to ask themselves if soap operas are really that far from entertainment that is considered critically legitimate. Whether they did was out of my hands." Phelps also commented on Franco's appearance helping the genre, stating: "It's just such a kick that somebody who has never done this sort of material doesn't hold that sort of prejudice that we suffer from on a daily basis. It makes General Hospital – and hopefully all of daytime television – a cool place to be." New York Magazine wrote on Franco's impact on soap operas:

Franco essentially is doing something no one has done before: voluntarily, and apparently by his own design, embracing daytime drama. Soaps tend to be treated (unfairly) like a training ground for actors who want to achieve 'real' stardom elsewhere, so an artist of James's talent, youth, and fame level choosing to act there, even for two weeks, is like eating lunch alone in the cafeteria for two years only to have the hottest dude in school ask if he can sit with you and share a plate of fries.

Even in 2013, the character was still an intricate part of several major plots with the reveal of his connection to the Quartermaines, and the introductions of his former lover Ava Jerome, played by Emmy winner Maura West, and his daughter, Kiki Jerome (originated by Kristen Alderson in the spring of 2013).

In 2023, Charlie Mason from Soaps She Knows placed Franco at #35 on his ranked list of General Hospital’s 40+ Greatest Characters of All Time, commenting "Once a fearsome villain, Liz’s ~~latest~~ late husband — thanks to the removal of that pesky homicidal brain tumor — became known as not only one of Port Charles’ biggest sweethearts but one of its funniest residents, too."
