= Kiki Jerome =

Fictional character from General Hospital

- General Hospital character
- Hayley Erin as Kiki Jerome
- Portrayed by: Kristen Alderson (2013–2015); Hayley Erin (2015–2019)
- Duration: 2013–2019
- First appearance: May 13, 2013
- Last appearance: August 23, 2019
- Created by: Ron Carlivati (Note: The character's introduction as Franco's child was shown in late 2009, under executive producer Jill Farren Phelps and head writer Robert Guza, Jr. The character was later developed and introduced under executive producer, Frank Valentini and head writer, Ron Carlivati.)
- Introduced by: Frank Valentini
In-universe information
- Other names: Lauren Frank; Lauren Corinthos; Lauren Katherine Jerome; Lauren Jerome; Lauren Quartermaine
- Occupation: Nurse; Waitress
- Family: Jerome
- Parents: Silas Clay; Ava Jerome
- Half-sisters: Nelle Benson; Willow Tait; Avery Corinthos
- Spouse: Morgan Corinthos (2013)
- Grandparents: Victor Jerome; Delia Ryan
- Aunts and uncles: Dino Antoinelli; Julian Jerome; Evan Jerome; Olivia St. John; Stephen Clay; Johnno Ryan
- Nephews: Wiley Quartermaine Corinthos; Wiley-Cooper Jones
- Nieces: Amelia Corinthos
- First cousins: Evan Jerome Jr.; Sam McCall; Owen Ryan; Lucas Jones; Rafe Kovich, Jr.; Leo Falconeri; Andrew Nero

Kiki Jerome is a fictional character from General Hospital, an American soap opera on the ABC network. The role was originated by Kristen Alderson in 2013 when Kiki was introduced as the troublesome girlfriend of Morgan Corinthos (Bryan Craig) having gotten him involved in a dangerous gambling ring. The character was written into the series as the illegitimate daughter of Franco (James Franco/Roger Howarth) in 2009. Upon her introduction, Kiki's mother Ava Jerome (Maura West) reveals that she is the biological daughter of Silas Clay (Michael Easton). In 2015, Alderson exited the role and was replaced by Hayley Erin, who exited the role in late 2018. Erin returned for a one-episode guest appearance in 2019.

The character of Kiki has been quite polarizing for viewers and critics specifically because of the character's lack of development. Many believed Kiki, who initially comes off as a scheming bad girl, had become too much like Starr Manning. Some viewed the recast as a chance to reset the character while others questioned if the character was needed at all. The recast has led to viewers and critics alike re-evaluating the role with many still divided about the need for the character. However, TV Source Magazine specifically praised the writing for Kiki's downward spiral after her father's murder and her mother's recent betrayal with Morgan.

Alderson was nominated for the Daytime Emmy Award for Outstanding Younger Actress in a Drama Series in 2015. Erin's portrayal later received a nomination in the category in 2018, before garnering the award in 2019.

== Development ==
=== Creation and casting ===
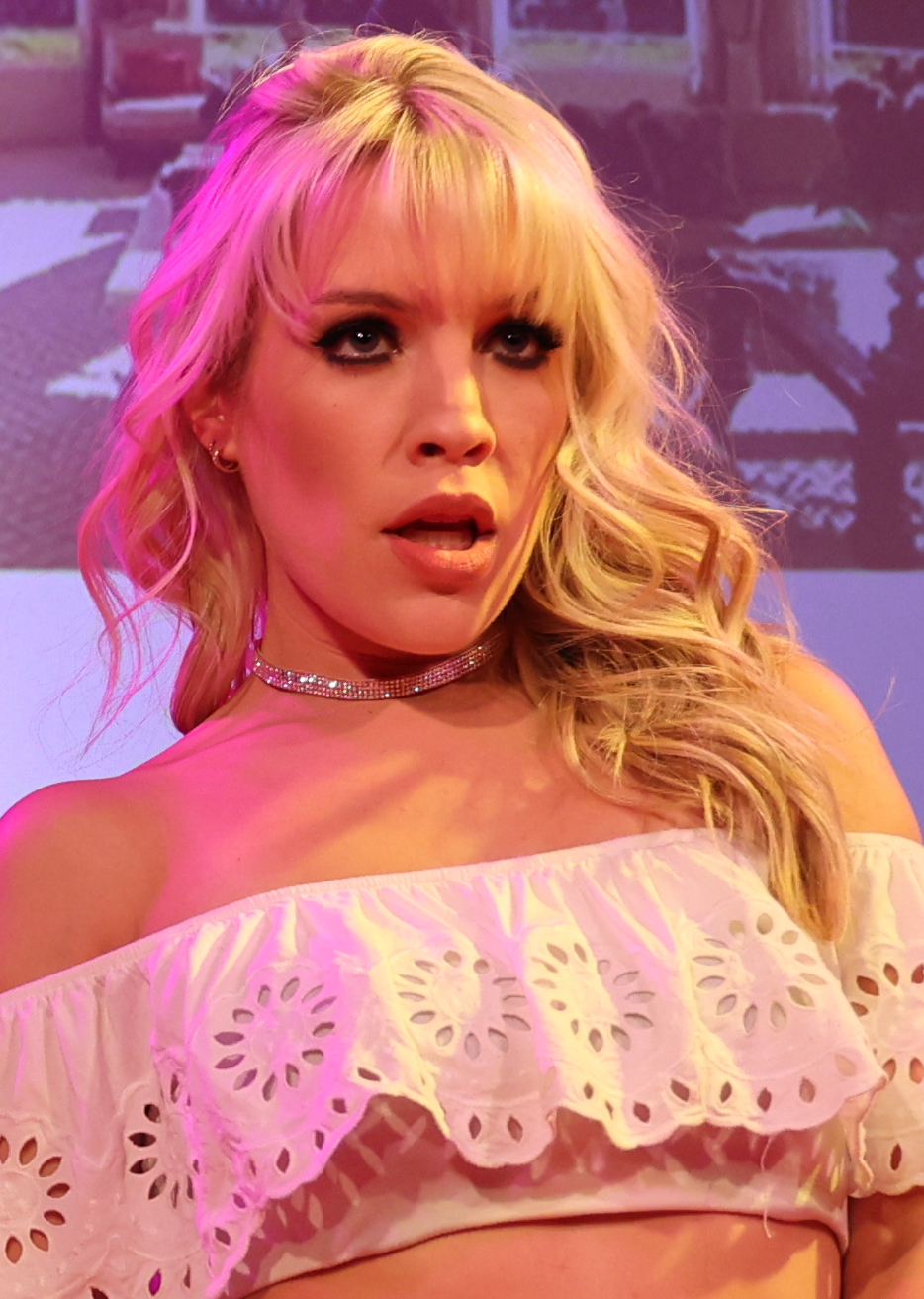
Kristen Alderson portrayed Kiki from 2013 to 2015

The role was originated by Kristen Alderson in 2013. Alderson had previously appeared in the role of Starr Manning—a role she originated on One Life to Live. Alderson along with several of her One Life co-stars would continue playing their roles on General Hospital when One Life was cancelled. When One Life to Live was relaunched online, Alderson was forced to vacate the role of Starr. The producers then created a new role for Alderson. Alderson said of her new character, "I really wanted to be someone completely new" but also wanted to incorporate some Starr's qualities into Kiki. Alderson wanted to play the "bad girl" but also admitted that it took some getting used to. In January 2015, it was announced that Alderson would vacate the role of Kiki. While Alderson did not immediately comment on her departure, her then boyfriend and co-star Chad Duell revealed that it was her decision. Soap Central reported that Alderson refused to take a "substantial" pay cut and instead decided not to renew her contract. While there were rumblings of a recast, nothing was solidified. Alderson filmed her final scenes on January 15, 2015, and made her final appearance during February Sweeps. Alderson later discussed the reason for her departure in a YouTube video and described her decision to vacate the role as "spur of the moment." At the time of Alderson's announcement, it was not known whether the character would be written out or recast.

Erin on being a recast

I walked in here having to work with things that had already been established. Now I have things that are mine, that I've created... It just keeps getting better and I am so happy to be here.

— Mara Levinsky, Soap Opera Digest

Several days later, it was reported that Hayley Erin—who previously appeared as Abby Newman on The Young and the Restless had been hired to recast the role of Kiki Jerome. The network released a statement to wish Alderson well on her career and to confirm Hayley Erin's casting. Alderson herself also congratulated Erin on her casting on Twitter. Erin received a callback after her initial audition to read opposite head writer Ron Carlivati. "It was between me and one other girl" though she was unaware that it was for a recast. After the audition, Erin left the studio and was quickly contacted by her agent and manager instructing her to return to the studio for a wardrobe fitting. "I started crying a little bit" she revealed. Up until a few days before her audition, Erin revealed that a return to daytime after five years was the last thing on her mind. Erin had just expressed her interest in appearing on another soap and she booked the role of Kiki later that week. In the summer of 2015, rumors circulated that Erin would be replaced by a returning Kristen Alderson. Network executive Nathan Varni denied the rumors and said "I have a lot of faith in the role of Kiki moving forward. Varni also praised the actress and said "I think Hayley [Erin] is doing a fantastic, admirable job as Kiki."

In March 2018, when Erin was revealed to have joined the cast of the Pretty Little Liars spin-off Pretty Little Liars: The Perfectionists as a series regular; questions arose whether she'd be leaving the soap as Kiki. Eight months later, Erin's exit was announced; she made her last appearance on November 28, 2018. On August 20, 2019, it was announced that Erin would briefly reprise the role of Kiki.

=== Characterization ===
According to Alderson, Lauren is very different from Starr, though the two still had some similarities. Alderson had been posting several pictures via social media but intentionally hiding her hair, leading to speculation that her appearance would be very different. A SOAPnet promo confirmed Alderson's change in appearance in early May. Alderson revealed to Soap Opera Digest that Kiki is reminiscent of a younger Starr who is quite the trouble maker. Alderson said she "channeled the sassy, spunky bad girl that Starr used to be before she matured." She continued, "Kiki's also a little more seductive." Alderson described Kiki as being "darker and edgier" then her former alter ego. Kiki is "risqué" when compared to Starr who is a "one man kind of girl."

When Erin started the audition process, the producers told her, "Yeah she's a bad girl. We're gonna make her edgier." While those were the intentions for the character, during Alderson's tenure, the writing strayed from that path. Hayley Erin found it easy to get a handle on the character describing Kiki as being "so relatable." She continued and compared Kiki to her former role as Abby Newman on The Young and the Restless: "Abby was very one-dimensional... . Kiki's got layers" Erin said. The actress described the character as "kind of tough" yet "sensitive." Of the writings bringing back the character's edge, Erin said "Now, it's fun" and "they made a character that a little foggy seem clearer."

=== Paternity and lineage ===
When actor James Franco started his guest star arc as a crazed artist turned serial killer, Robert "Franco" Frank, character of Kiki, originally known as Lauren was first written into the series in December 2009. The girl was apparently kept from Franco by her "bitch" of a mother. In April 2012, viewers are falsely led to believe that Franco is the fraternal twin brother of Jason Morgan (Steve Burton), making him, and Lauren by extension, members of the Quartermaine family. It is later revealed that Kiki is the biological daughter of Dr. Silas Clay (Michael Easton) who had an affair with her mother that destroyed his marriage. Kiki's mother is the mysterious Ava Jerome (Maura West) -- an art dealer from New York City. However, Kiki later learns that Ava is a member of the infamous 80s crime family, the Jerome family—the illegitimate daughter of deceased mobster Victor Jerome and Delia Ryan (Ilene Kristen), a character from the cancelled ABC Daytime soap opera, Ryan's Hope. Having become accustomed to her mother's lies, Kiki isn't too shocked to learn of her connection to the Jeromes—however, this is another lie that "rocks her world" Alderson stated. This is unfamiliar territory for Kiki because Ava has always shielded her from the crime world.

After her mother's presumed death, Kiki starts building a relationship with Silas. Actress Hayley Erin said "They have a little relationship, and it's sweet" but Silas cannot replace Ava. Kiki really tries to establish that connection with Silas and they do but "She just wishes he were around more." In "losing" Ava, Kiki "lost herself" and resorts to questionable actions such as drugging Michael in an attempt to make sure he loses custody of their sister. Kiki descends further into turmoil when she finds Silas stabbed to death and believing Franco is guilty she feels "sheer hatred" for him. What makes it most difficult is that she has trusted Franco so much. Kiki is very relieved when Franco is proven to be innocent of her father's murder and Ava, who has been passing herself off as Ava's twin is revealed to be alive. Hayley Erin was quite upset by the decision to kill off Silas. "I took it personally" she said. The actress later continued, "But it made for a great storyline and there was a lot of great material for all of us." Instead of focusing on whether Kiki was aware that Ava was truly alive in her portrayal, Erin went with the most basic off all the emotions with Kiki only being happy to have her mother back. Kiki's glee at having Ava back is ruined when she learns about Ava and Morgan's secret affair. Erin noted the irony of Kiki having Ava for a mother as "the worst thing that could have happened to anyone" while the actress said getting to work opposite Maura West is the "greatest thing that could ever happen to anyone." She continued, "I love it, because she makes me step up my game."

=== Alcoholism and rebuilding ===
After discovering Morgan and Ava's affair and losing her father, Kiki spirals out of control and turns to alcohol. Kiki finally hits "rock bottom" on Halloween she gets behind the wheel drunk—and causes a car accident. The actress relished in her portrayal of Kiki during the alcohol story. "Drunk Kiki was great" Erin enthused. Erin also credited the storyline with helping to sway viewer opinion about her character. She later said "I was doing something a bit out of the norm for me. It was actual acting." Head writer Jean Passanante described Kiki as someone "who is still growing up and struggling to figure out who she is, even as she moves forward." Passanante continued, "You can't go through what she went through [...] and not change." In addition to Franco, his girlfriend and her former stepmother Nina Clay (Michelle Stafford) and Morgan rallying around her, Kiki holds down a steady job for the first time since her introduction. Kiki also works toward rebuilding a relationship with her mother. "In a strange way, right now, Kiki has more support than she's had for quite a while."

=== Relationships ===
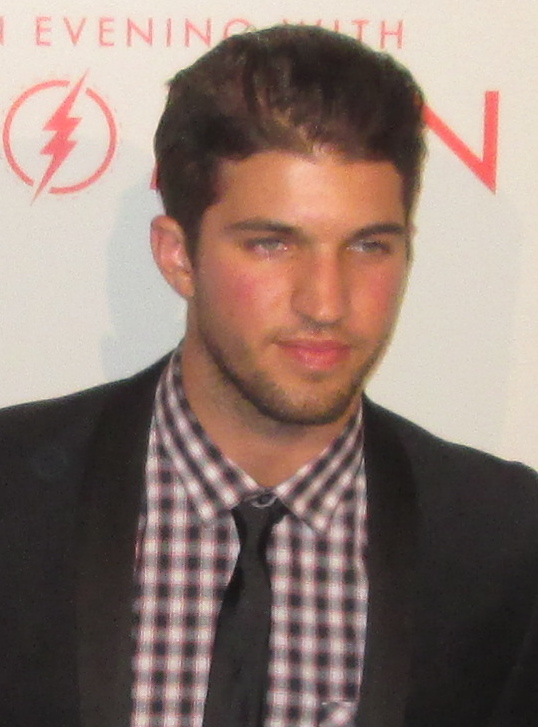
Bryan Craig portrayed Kiki's love interest Morgan Corinthos

Upon introduction, Kiki is in a relationship with Morgan Corinthos (Bryan Craig). Of the romance Alderson said her character is "having a great time with Morgan" and her feelings for him are "genuine." However, Morgan's loved ones don't approve of the relationship because of the trouble Kiki causes. A Soapnet promo indicated that Alderson's Kiki could potentially drive a wedge between Morgan and his brother, Michael (Chad Duell) who immediately clashes with Kiki. Alderson later explained that Kiki views Michael as a "challenge" because of his apparent disdain for her. She is accustomed to having men fall at her feet so she pushes Michael's buttons to get under his skin and his obvious annoyance intrigues her more. The actress continued, "Kiki kind of loves it when someone loves/hates her!" Michael and Kiki later share a kiss only to learn they are cousins the Quartermaines. Despite the obvious attraction, Michael and Kiki decide to keep their distance from one another and keep quiet about the kiss. Whether intentional or not, Kiki's actions and feelings pit one brother against the other.

Later, Kiki guilt trips herself into accepting Morgan's sudden marriage proposal because of her attraction to Michael. While Kiki isn't interested in a serious relationship, she recognizes that Morgan really cares for her but she still feels something is missing. Kiki also believes marrying Morgan will help her get over Michael. By the time she marries Morgan, Kiki and Michael have made peace with the fact that they can't be together. However everything changes when it is revealed that Morgan knew Michael and Kiki weren't related before the wedding. A shocked Kiki doesn't really know how to react and though she is angry at Morgan for his lies, she is relieved that she now has a valid reason to walk away from the marriage she never truly wanted. Throughout her relationship with Michael, Kiki remains very close with Morgan. However, after her split from Morgan, the two are practically attached at the hip. Erin said Kiki is able to look back on their relationship fondly and see that "Morgan has been there for her this entire time" and she realizes how good of a guy he is. The romantic feelings quickly resurface when the duo pretend to be romantically involved to spite Michael. "Kiki has rediscovered her feelings for Morgan, for sure" said Erin. The story featured actress Hayley Erin's very first onscreen kiss and her first love scene which was covered by Extra. Erin credited Bryan Craig for helping her through the scenes. "It was just a big joke to us."

Kiki and Morgan's reunion is short-lived due to the fact that she discovers he has been sleeping with Ava behind her back. While the actress is aware of the unfolding bipolar storyline for the character of Morgan, Kiki knows nothing of this -- "She just thinks he is cheating on her." While Kiki does notice some odd behavior and mood swings, there isn't enough to clue her in that something more is going on. Co-head writer Shelly Altman said that Kiki and Morgan could "help one another heal" or "they could wind up feeding off of each other's worst impulses." According to Jean Passanante, the potential to hurt one another again worries Kiki as they get close again. However it is because of their mutual history that seem "they understand each other." Altman said Morgan's bipolar diagnosis aids in helping Kiki thaw toward Morgan.

After leaving Morgan, Kiki immediately starts a romance with Michael. The pairing would pair Alderson back with her real-life boyfriend Chad Duell whom she worked with as Starr. Alderson worried about how fans would react to Kiki and Michael's relationship because Starr and Kiki are so different and "it was interesting to see Michael with Kiki" who is a lot less refined than Starr. However, the romance doesn't get much development, and ends a year later when Michael dumps Kiki after discovering she has been keeping quiet about Sonny's part in the murder of his biological father, A. J. Quartermaine (Sean Kanan). Hayley Erin later said, "When she was with Michael, I don't think she was thinking about Michael." While she was definitely fully invested in the relationship, Kiki also had feelings for Morgan. "Michael wouldn't be good for her now." However, Erin said Kiki and Michael "will always have a special relationship whether or not either of them acknowledge it." While she is no longer in love with Michael, "she's always going to have love for him."

== Storylines ==
Kiki is introduced as the girlfriend of Morgan Corinthos (Bryan Craig) who has gotten into trouble with gambling debt. When Morgan's brother Michael (Chad Duell) forces Morgan to go back home to Port Charles, Kiki follows and moves in with Morgan and Michael. While they initially get off on the wrong foot, Kiki softens toward Michael when she learns why he is so protective of Morgan. Kiki is shocked when her mother Ava Jerome (Maura West) confesses that her father, Franco (Roger Howarth) is very much alive. In addition, Kiki is also shocked to learn that Ava is a member of the powerful Jerome crime family that is challenging Michael and Morgan's father Sonny Corinthos (Maurice Benard) for his territory. After they kiss, Michael and Kiki are led to believe they are cousins. Noticing the attraction, Morgan convinces Kiki to marry him in the summer of 2013 only for it to be revealed that Kiki is the biological daughter of Dr. Silas Clay (Michael Easton). To divert his new bride's attention, Morgan resorts to buying Kiki expensive gifts. The marriage quickly implodes when Kiki learns that Morgan knew about her paternity before they married and she files for an annulment. Despite the fact that she is now dating Michael, Kiki is furious to discover Morgan and Ava are having an affair.

In 2014, when Michael and Morgan's mother Carly Corinthos (Laura Wright) goes missing and Franco is the main suspect, Kiki helps him escape custody believing he is innocent. Though Franco rescues Carly, Michael still blames Kiki and Franco for the situation. Kiki later moves in with Silas and is shocked when Michael's uncle Luke Spencer (Anthony Geary) starts hitting on her. Instead of confiding in Michael who is grieving the loss of his biological father A. J. Quartermaine (Sean Kanan), she confides in Morgan. Kiki eventually comes clean to Michael about Luke which leads to Tracy Quartermaine (Jane Elliot) losing her job as CEO of the family's company ELQ—and Michael being appointed to the position. In the summer of 2014, after her cousin Rafe Kovich, Jr. (Jimmy Deshler) passes away, Kiki reconciles with a pregnant Ava who fears Sonny will kill her once she gives birth because Ava knows Sonny killed A. J. Feeling the need to protect Michael, Morgan and Kiki agree to keep quiet. Kiki is suspicious of Michael's new assistant Rosalie Martinez (Linda Elena Tovar) who has realized they are keeping something from him. Kiki and Morgan lie, claiming they are planning a surprise party for Michael. Kiki later learns that Carly has been cheating on Franco with Sonny and tells him the truth days before Carly and Franco's wedding. On the wedding day, Franco confronts Carly about her cheating and then reveals that Sonny killed A. J. and Carly has been helping him cover it up. Michael is furious to discover both Kiki and Morgan knew about A. J.'s murder and he dumps her. Kiki is furious to learn that Ava tricked Sonny into killing A. J., believing that A. J. was responsible for killing his girlfriend Connie Falconeri (Kelly Sullivan), a crime that Ava really committed. At the same time, Kiki and Ava worry about Ava's newborn daughter who has been stolen from her.

While the baby is rescued and Ava names her Avery, both Sonny and Ava are sent to prison, leaving the child in Kiki's care. Kiki is devastated when Ava is killed trying to escape prison. Meanwhile, Sonny is given a pardon, and is free to raise Avery; Kiki decides against fighting for custody. Morgan and Kiki side with Sonny when Michael decides he wants to raise Avery, believing he is only taking custody of Avery to punish Sonny. Michael wins the custody battle and bans everyone, including Kiki from visiting Avery. Furious when Michael hires Sabrina Santiago (Teresa Castillo) — the woman who caused Ava to go into premature labor — as Avery's nanny, Kiki goes along with Morgan's plan to drug Michael to get him to act out in public so he will lose custody of Avery. Just before they go back to court, baby Avery is kidnapped. Meanwhile, Morgan and Kiki bond and rekindle their romance as she forms a connection with the mysterious Denise DeMuccio—claiming to be her mother's identical twin. As Kiki bonds with Denise, Silas is very weary of their growing connection. Kiki is devastated when she finds Silas murdered in July 2015 and believes Franco is responsible. During Franco's trial, Kiki is shocked to learn that Denise is actually a very much alive Ava. Kiki is devastated when Franco admits that Ava and Morgan have been sleeping together behind her back.

After dumping Morgan and disowning Ava once again, a bitter, angry Kiki starts drinking heavily. She then talks her former stepmother and Franco's girlfriend Nina Clay (Michelle Stafford) into buying Silas's apartment because she wants to move out. Franco convinces Nina to let Kiki stay with them for her own good. Kiki later attends a Halloween party where sees Morgan with another girl, gets drunk and berates him for his betrayal with her mother. Completely intoxicated, Kiki tries to make her way back home and causes a car accident. Fortunately, Morgan finds her and brings her home safely. Kiki later testifies on Sonny's behalf during Avery's custody hearing to spite her mother. With no recollection of Halloween night, Kiki is shocked when Franco's car is identified by the police as having run Carly off the road. Morgan convinces Kiki to keep quiet assuring her that Carly is ok, and that she can't start rebuilding her life from prison. He then helps her get a job as a waitress at the Metro Court Hotel. Morgan later convinces Kiki to go on a vacation with him to his father's cabin. Kiki is shocked when Morgan starts exhibiting severe mood swings after he reveals that someone else owns the cabin, and he broke in. Kiki calls Michael for help when Morgan goes on a rampage with a shotgun trying to protect her. Morgan's family arrives to restrain him, and Kiki turns herself in when she returns to Port Charles. However, Carly decides not to press charges, and invites Kiki to spend Thanksgiving with a hospitalized Morgan and their family. Her last thanksgiving 2018, she was killed by Ryan Chamberlain (Jon Lindstrom), Kevin Collins's twin brother, because her "mother" Ava was jealous because, Kiki was in a relationship with Griffin Monroe, her ex. So "Kevin" aka Ryan killed her and placed the weapon in Griffin's closet.

== Reception ==
The decision to re-introduce all three former One Life to Live actors in new roles simultaneously was met with skepticism. "[It] will either be a trainwreck or brilliant," said Sara Bibel. Bibel criticized the overall decision after the dust settled and said it went "very wrong." When Kiki is revealed to be Franco's daughter, Bibel said "it seems like the whole stunt was convoluted way to keep Howarth and Alderson playing father and daughter." Despite the rocky start, Bibel praised the explosive storylines that came from Alderson's re-introduction as Kiki. Bibel compared the triangle between Michael, Kiki and Morgan to the extremely controversial and iconic romantic triangle in the late 90s between Carly (Michael and Morgan's mother) and brothers, A. J. and Jason. A poll in Soap Opera Digest revealed that 48% of viewers loved Michael and Kiki because they were fans of Michael and Starr, while 33% of viewers would only accept the pairing if they turned out not be cousins. Kristen Alderson earned a Daytime Emmy nomination for the Outstanding Younger Actress in a Drama Series for her portrayal of Kiki in 2015.

Michael Fairman said the character of Kiki "has often proved problematic for the audience, at times, to invest in." He later said, "Kiki has never really felt to the audience as the most fully-fleshed out character, and that is even from the time Kristen Alderson was playing the role and had to quickly shift from playing Starr Manning to the newly-created character of Kiki. Omar Nobloes from TV Source Magazine said the debate over whether a recast was needed would be "futile" and expressed his hope that the recast would help to "reset" Kiki who started off with "promise" and later turned into a "watered down" Starr. Nobles described Erin as a good actress and praised her tenure on The Young and the Restless. Looking forward to seeing her in the role, Nobles hoped viewers would give the actress a chance to make the character her own. Jenn Bishop praised Kiki's downward spiral after losing her father and discovering Ava and Morgan's betrayal. "It's amazing how entertaining Kiki is now" Bishop stated. She continued, "This is so much better than the clueless vestal virgin of the Corinthos clan we had to suffer through for too long." She continued that Kiki hitting "rockbottom" was a good way of "rebooting the character" and develop Kiki into a "more viable" character. "Embracing the character's aimlessness and tendency to make poor choices feels right." Bishop also praised Erin's potential as Kiki and said all she needed was the right story.
