= Shaun Evans (One Life to Live) =

- One Life to Live character
- Portrayed by: Sean Ringgold
- Duration: 2006–13
- First appearance: April 26, 2006
- Last appearance: August 5, 2013
- Created by: Dena Higley
- Introduced by: Frank Valentini
In-universe information
- Occupation: Bodyguard
- Parents: Richard Evans; Phylicia Evans
- Siblings: Greg Evans; Destiny Evans (legal)
- Grandparents: Fred Wenton
- Nieces and nephews: Destiny Evans; Drew Buchanan II (legal)

Shaun Evans is a fictional character on the American soap opera One Life to Live.

== Casting ==
Initially a recurring character, the role was originated by Sean Ringgold in 2006. Ringgold announced as upgraded to contract status in late October 2010 with his first contract episodes airing the week of January 24, 2011. Ringgold remained on the show through the original television finale on January 13, 2012. In 2013, Ringgold reprised his role in new regular episodes of OLTL aired on Hulu via The Online Network from June 20 to August 5, 2013.

== Storyline ==
Shaun Evans made his first appearance as the bodyguard of Vincent Jones, in 2006. As a good friend to Vince, Shaun aided him when being investigated by John McBain, and also helped to mend the broken relationship Vince once had with Layla Williamson. Shaun later became of use to the Llanview Police Department when Vincent's properties became a target of arson. With the help of his grandfather Fred Wenton, the police discover that the origin of the arsons were from a white supremacist group, One Pure People. After Vincent left town in 2008, Shaun was hired as a bodyguard by Todd Manning, who feared for the safety of his children after his enemy Lee Ramsey became the police commissioner. But Shaun quit when Todd got violent toward his daughter Starr and her boyfriend Cole Thornhart. When Todd's ex-wife Blair Cramer won sole custody of the children, she hired Shaun to protect the kids from Todd. in February 2009, Matthew Buchanan became acquainted with a freshman, Destiny Evans who like him was also not socially accepted. Destiny was later revealed to be Shaun's sister. After Matthew becomes paralyzed due to a car accident, Destiny soon begun to relentlessly ask for a way to contact their oldest brother Greg with hopes that he may be the answer to Matthew's problem, however due to conflict between the two brothers, Shaun quickly refuses Destiny's request. As Shaun becomes further involved in Destiny's life, he meets Matthew's sister Rachel Gannon and the two quickly break the ice. While the two date, Shaun shares his view of his brother with Rachel.

When Greg arrives in Llanview, tension begins to rise between Shaun and Greg. Shaun soon notices Greg's obvious attraction to Rachel and begins to wonder if Rachel feels the same. With hopes of erasing these thoughts, Shaun confronts Rachel on the matter. Rachel and Greg later share a kiss, prompting Rachel to dump Shaun for Greg. While protecting Starr and her child Hope, Shaun is shot and rushed to the hospital for emergency surgery; he survives with the help of his brother. The Evans family's joy is short-lived as Shaun suffers cardiac arrest and lapses into a coma after surgery to retrieve a bullet fragment lodged in his head goes awry. Shaun awakens from the coma a month later. After Shaun recovers, Rachel reveals that she is not in love with him. Shaun asks if she is in love with Greg, but Rachel avoids the question. In the park, Rachel tells Greg she does not want to pursue a relationship with him, for fear of hurting Shaun. After seeing the couple kiss, Shaun lashes out, warning Rachel that Greg will get bored with her and move on to another woman. Shaun later begins dating Dr. Vivian Wright, who previously dated Greg.

When Téa Delgado learns she is dying and wants to spend her final days at a private hospice out of town, Shaun helps her get there while evading Todd's private investigators. As Téa weakens from her brain tumor with plans to die alone, he keeps his promise to ban Todd and their daughter Danielle from her location. However, after being kidnapped by Todd’s goons (whom he overpowers), Shaun reluctantly takes them to see her. Later, he is ridden with guilt when they learn she died - leaving Dani inconsolable. With his want for knowledge on Téa's whereabouts, Todd kidnaps Shaun in hopes he will lead him and Dani to Téa because of his conscience Shaun agreed. When they arrived, however, Shaun's brother Greg told them that Téa had died the night before. Shaun smelled a rat and questioned why Greg was so determined to keep Téa from her family, but Greg said he was only doing what his patient requested. When it had become clear that Greg was working with Eli, Shaun demanded to know why and was shocked to hear that Eli knew their sister Destiny was really Greg's daughter, one Greg had with one of Shaun's past girlfriends while Shaun was in Statesville. Shaun apologizes once again to Téa and Todd for the trouble Greg put them through and goes on to witness Greg's sentencing. In July 2011 Shaun learns that Destiny is pregnant with Matthews child. Shaun also helps John McBain while he's investigating the presumed murder of Victor Lord Jr. when Shaun plays his voice mail message from his cell phone from Victor on the night of his "death" (Victor later turned out to be still alive and secretly kidnapped by Allison Perkins). And on January 13, 2012, Shaun is there for Destiny when she gives birth to her and Matthew's son Drew Buchanan, named after his older deceased brother Drew Buchanan.
