= Todd Manning and Blair Cramer =

Todd and Blair
- Roger Howarth and Kassie DePaiva as Todd and Blair
- Duration: 1994–97, 2000–09, 2011–
- Introduced by: Susan Bedsow Horgan
- Trevor St. John and Kassie DePaiva as Todd/Victor and Blair
In-universe information
- Other names: T&B, TnB
- Family: Lord; Cramer
- Spouse: 1995, 1995–97, 2001–02, 2013– 2003–04, 2007–08 (with Todd/Victor)
- Children: Starr Manning; Jack Manning; Sam Manning

Thomas Todd Manning and Blair Cramer Manning are fictional characters and a supercouple from the ABC daytime drama One Life to Live. In 2012, they also appeared together on General Hospital. Todd was originated by Roger Howarth and later portrayed by actor Trevor St. John. On August 17, 2011, St. John's character was revealed to be Todd's identical twin brother, Victor Lord Jr., conditioned to believe he was Todd and assume Todd's identity. Blair has been portrayed by Kassie DePaiva since the couple's inception.

The couple is often called "T&B" or "TnB" (for Todd and Blair) by fans on Internet message boards. Their popularity led to a nomination at the Daytime Emmy Awards, cited as one of television's top couples. An often tempestuous but loving relationship, the two have been titled "hands down the most brilliantly complex couple on daytime".

== Writing ==
Todd and Blair's creation as a couple is described as factoring in several aspects of their own personalities, as well as their individual life experiences. In an interview, former One Life to Live head writer Michael Malone detailed the varying elements, what he set out to create, and how the couple eventually evolved:

Todd and Blair were a great deal alike, two bad apples, two lost souls: conniving, deceitful, wounded and hiding the wounds for all they were worth behind a smart and sexy facade. Both were very much on guard against ever being susceptible to love. (A Scarlett and Rhett match-up, to use my perennial GWTW analogy that used to drive Josh Griffith crazy. I loved the movie, he didn't.) The idea for Todd/Blair came from wondering what would happen if two tricksters set out to trick each other, with no genuine thought of romance, and what if the ultimate trick was on them and they fell in love? In the beginning, Blair was trying to marry Todd for his money before he found out he was the heir to the Lord fortune, and Todd was trying to hurt any and everybody in town. Slowly they learned how much they had in common — both had rotten childhoods that left them with deep insecurities, both had rotten reputations in Llanview (and deserved them), both were willing to go to any lengths to get what they wanted — the safety of immense wealth, the thrill of somebody else's spouse, social acceptance by those who'd rejected them.

As soon as we put them together, the chemistry between Roger and Kassie was wonderful and we knew they would work as a couple. But deepest down, we planned to play that Blair was still in love with Max. That old flame was going to flare up and start fireworks as she and Todd started to fight over the ultimate prize of their daughter, Starr. Different producers, network folk, different writers took their story other places. — Michael Malone

In a 2001 interview, when asked if Todd and Blair are soulmates, actress Kassie DePaiva, portrayer of Blair, stated "Yes. Their connection is so deeply rooted. Less is more with them. They don't even need dialogue to speak. What they don't say speaks volumes."

In a 2008 interview, actor Trevor St. John, then-portrayer of Todd, spoke of Todd and Blair's on-again/off-again relationship. "It's a never-ending cycle," he said. "That's what people expect; they want Todd and Blair together, and the writers give them what they expect. It's not necessarily true that they'll do exactly what the fans want, but they do have an expectation, so the writers meet it." St. John did express discontent with the back and forth nature of the couple, however. He noted wanting something different. "Like I said", he stated, "there is an endless recycling of breaking up with Blair and getting back together, breaking up with Blair, then getting back together."

== Impact ==
"You know that they love each other, and they know that they love each other…but they're both messed-up people.

— Kassie DePaiva on Todd and Blair

Todd and Blair are often recognized as one of television's most prominent pairings. The two were nominated for "Most Irresistible Combination" at the 32nd Daytime Emmy Awards, and in 2001, were nominated for About.com's couple of the year title. In 2002, Todd and Blair were named the top One Life to Live all-time romantic couple by magazine Soaps In Depth. They are also one of the most avidly watched supercouples.

Before the writers secured Todd and Blair as a supercouple, the pairing was often in direct competition with rival couple Todd and Téa, an alternate romantic pairing for Todd. This created an intense rivalry between the two fanbases, which became known as the "T&B vs. TnT" wars, and were some of the genre's most notorious Internet battles. They left writers and producers with the task of deciding which couple would be the "true love" couple. In addition, viewers enjoyed the battles between Blair and Téa, which became one of soap opera's most entertaining rivalries.

While Todd is the town rapist (having raped Marty Saybrooke in college), Blair herself is the product of rape (as her mentally ill mother was raped and impregnated by an unnamed hospital attendant).

Todd and Blair were the original founders of "The Most Pathetic Club" in which they competed for the title of "Most Pathetic." They had their first real meeting at Rodi's Bar in 1994; Blair was drinking at the bar when Todd came up and asked if the seat next to her was taken. The writers also scripted Todd and Blair as best friends before the two ever became involved romantically.

== See also ==
- List of supercouples
- Todd Manning and Marty Saybrooke rape storylines
- Lord family
- Cramer family
