= New Life (2023 film) =

2023 horror film

- Film poster
- Directed by: John Rosman
- Written by: John Rosman
- Produced by: T. Justin Ross; Mike Marchlewski
- Starring: Sonya Walger; Hayley Erin; Tony Amendola
- Cinematography: Mark Evans
- Distributed by: Brainstorm Media
- Release dates: August 8, 2023 (Fantasia International Film Festival); May 3, 2024 (United States)
- Running time: 84 minutes
- Country: United States
- Language: English

New Life is a 2023 American zombie horror-thriller film written and directed by John Rosman, starring Sonya Walger, Hayley Erin, and Tony Amendola. It premiered at the 27th Fantasia International Film Festival on August 8, 2023, and was released theatrically on May 3, 2024.

== Plot ==
A bleeding woman named Jessica Murdock (Hayley Erin) escapes from a containment facility and flees across the Pacific Northwest, hoping to reach the Canadian border. Jessica kills a guard during her escape and believes that she is being pursued for murder. Elsa Gray (Sonya Walger), a fixer battling an ALS diagnosis, pursues Jessica. Jessica meets several kind strangers, who assume that she is fleeing from domestic violence. These include an elderly couple who work on a farm, as well as a bartender named Molly.

Elsa is initially told that she is working for the government and that Jessica is infected with a strain of Ebola virus. She tracks Jessica to the home of Janie and Frank, the farmers who helped Jessica. Janie and Frank have become zombies; Elsa is forced to shoot them. Elsa realizes that she is working for a pharmaceutical company who is trying to protect its reputation. Jessica is not carrying Ebola, but an unknown infectious agent. She was infected by a dog which escaped from the containment facility.

Jessica witnesses the bartender Molly becoming a zombie; she is horrified to realize that she is infectious. Elsa confronts Jessica. Jessica begins to show signs of infection and promises that she will never return to the facility. Elsa is forced to kill her.

Elsa returns home; a caretaker helps her plan to modify her home to become ALS-accessible. The caretaker begins to cough, indicating that Elsa may also be infected.

== Cast ==
- Sonya Walger as Elsa Gray
- Hayley Erin as Jessica Murdock
- Tony Amendola as Raymond Reed
- Jeb Berrier as Vince Harding
- Ayanna Berkshire as Molly
- Betty Moyer as Janie
- Blaine Palmer as Frank

== Production ==
Principal photography took place in Oregon in 2022.

== Critical response ==
New Life has received a mostly positive critical response. On Rotten Tomatoes, the film holds a rating of 94% based on 63 critic reviews, with the consensus stating: "Breathing New Life to the genre, this excellently acted brooding horror thriller marks a propitious debut for John Rosman". Metacritic, which uses a weighted average, assigned the film a score of 68 out of 100, based on four critics, indicating "generally favorable" reviews.

Nick Allen of RogerEbert.com wrote: "As the film's initial scope of Jessica and Elsa continues to zoom out, we suddenly all know the traumatic horror of New Life all too well. And we feel for our hero to a depth that action-thrillers have never known. What a delight, what a discovery". Marco Vito Oddo of Collider declared that the film was "fresh and innovative, presenting a mix that works so well that it’s a wonder no one ever tried to do something similar before". Matt Donato of SlashFilm called it a "blistering multidimensional thriller that hits from all directions — the kind of debut filmmakers dream about".
