= Kristen Alderson =

American actress and singer (born 1991)

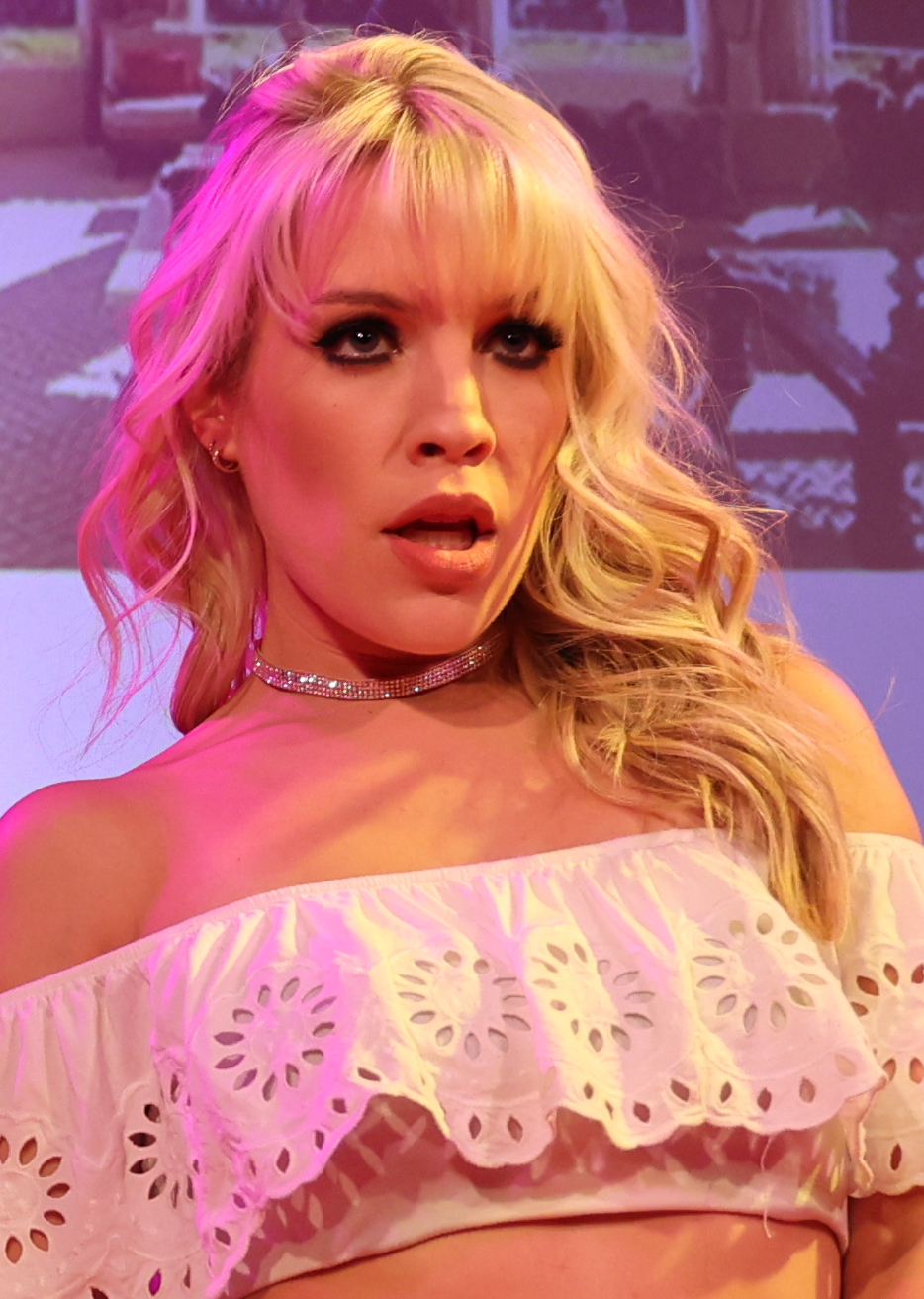
- Alderson as Britney Spears in Newsical, 2022
- Born: May 29, 1991 (age 35); Huntingdon Valley, Pennsylvania, U.S.
- Occupations: Actress, singer
- Years active: 1997–present
- Known for: One Life to Live/General Hospital as Starr Manning, General Hospital as Kiki Jerome
- Children: 1
- Relatives: Eddie Alderson (brother)

Kristen Alderson (born May 29, 1991) is an American actress and singer. She is best known for playing the role of Starr Manning on the ABC soap opera One Life to Live (1998 to 2012) and the ABC soap opera General Hospital (2012 to 2013). She also originated the role of Kiki Jerome on General Hospital (2013 to 2015). She won a Daytime Emmy Award for Outstanding Younger Actress for her role as Starr on General Hospital in 2013. She received nominations in the same category in 2014 and 2015.

== Early life ==
Alderson was born in Huntingdon Valley, Pennsylvania on May 29, 1991; she is the older sister of actor Eddie Alderson, who played Matthew Buchanan on One Life to Live from 2001 to 2012. She began acting at the age of five, after being inspired by a film about the making of Annie.

She attended Catholic school in Pennsylvania through seventh grade, but decided to receive tutoring on the set of One Life to Live for eighth grade. Alderson was a cheerleader in junior high school. She and her brother attended a performing arts high school in New York.

== Career ==
When she was four years old, Alderson's dance class appeared on a locally televised talent show, Al Alberts Showcase. Alderson was then individually chosen to perform on the series each week. An agent saw one of her performances and suggested that she audition for the Broadway production of Annie. Alderson was cast as Molly, replacing Christiana Anbri. She also played the role in a national tour of the musical. Alderson played Lexi Jules in the Eleventh Hour "Agro" 2008, and as Taisiya Seaver in The Hawthrone series "Trust Me" in 2009, Alderson, was 16 when she played Lexi Jules in 2008, and in 2009 she was 17 when she played Taisiya Seaver, On July 21, 2009, played Haley Reed in (The Eye 2008), she was the Same age as Jessica Alba in the movie.

Alderson auditioned for the role of Starr Manning on One Life to Live in February 1998 and won the part, replacing Meghan Rayder. She was six years old at the time. Her first airdate was March 20, 1998. The role was initially recurring, but Alderson was put on contract in April 2001. She won a Soap Opera Digest Award for Favorite Teen in 2005 for her work on One Life to Live.

In 2006, Alderson performed the song "Valentine" on One Life: Many Voices for Hurricane Relief, an album of songs by One Life to Live actors to raise funds for victims of Hurricane Katrina. She sang Sleigh Ride on A Holiday Affair, an album of classic holiday songs performed by actors from ABC soap operas. She also performed with the ensemble on the closing track, We Wish You a Merry Christmas. The album was promoted with a special on Soapnet, A Very Soapy Christmas. Alderson performed in musical episodes of One Life to Live, such as "Babes Behind Bars", "Prom Night: The Musical," and "Starr X'd Lovers." She also appeared in television commercials for JC Penney, Citgo and Soap Network.

On April 14, 2011, ABC announced the cancellations of both All My Children and One Life to Live, leaving General Hospital as the last remaining soap opera airing on the network after January 13, 2012. After One Life to Live finished filming on November 18, 2011, Alderson and her brother, who was also a OLTL cast member, turned down offers to reprise their roles in an online revival. They decided instead to relocate to Los Angeles.

On January 11, 2012, it was announced that Alderson and her former One Life to Live co-stars Kassie DePaiva, Michael Easton, and Roger Howarth, would reprise their roles on General Hospital. Alderson's first airdate was February 24, 2012. In March 2013, a legal conflict developed between ABC and Prospect Park, the company producing the online revival of OLTL. Prospect Park owned the rights to all OLTL characters at that time, preventing General Hospital from continuing to use them. TV Guide reported that the former One Life to Live actors would have to portray "characters that in no way resemble the current ones" in order to stay on General Hospital. Alderson's final airdate as Starr Manning on General Hospital was March 20, 2013. She debuted as a new character, Kiki Jerome, on May 13, 2013. In 2013, she received a Daytime Emmy Award for Outstanding Younger Actress in a Drama Series for her work as Starr on General Hospital.

On September 24, 2013, Alderson was honored as "The Star of Tomorrow" by the ZEPHRA Magazine Recognition Awards and the city of West Hollywood issued a proclamation for the actress. In 2014, she was nominated for a Daytime Emmy Award for Outstanding Younger Actress for her role as Kiki on General Hospital. On October 26, 2014, Alderson performed The Star-Spangled Banner at the University of Phoenix Stadium where the visiting Philadelphia Eagles faced the Arizona Cardinals.

On January 10, 2015, Soap Opera Digest reported that Alderson had decided to depart General Hospital, opting to not renew her contract. Her last airdate was February 16, 2015. The role of Kiki was recast with Hayley Erin. Alderson was nominated for a Daytime Emmy Award for Outstanding Younger Actress for the role of Kiki on General Hospital in 2015.

Alderson starred as Cindy Lou in the Off-Broadway play, The Marvelous Wonderettes, in April 2018 at New York's Theatre Row. In June 2018, Alderson said that she would be open to returning to General Hospital as Starr Manning, because Prospect Park no longer owns the rights to One Life to Live characters. In 2019, she was cast in the title role in the film The Glorious Resurrection of Claire Owens. In 2020, she appeared in the pilot episode of Mélange, an LGBT-focused series set in the 1980s.

In April 2022, Alderson starred on stage in Newsical at the Majestic Repertory Theatre in Las Vegas. Her partner, Taylor Crousore, co-starred with her in the production. The show also played at the V Theater in November 2022. In September 2022, they brought Newsical to the Garner Galleria Theatre in Denver. In March 2023, they performed Off-Broadway in Newsical at the AMT Theater in New York. In 2023, Alderson and Crousore launched a podcast about preparing for the birth of their first child, Expecting You. Alderson starred as Ashley Burke in the Lifetime film The Man in the Guest House, airing in February 2024.

== Personal life ==
Alderson became engaged to actor and comedian Taylor Crousore in July 2023. He proposed at Pier 84 at Hudson River Park, the location of their first meeting almost exactly two years earlier. In September 2023, Alderson announced that she was expecting her first child with Crousore. They announced the birth of their daughter in January 2024.

== Filmography ==
=== Television ===
Year	Title	Role	Notes
1998– 2012	One Life to Live	Starr Manning	Recurring role; Contract role (after April 2001): March 20, 1998, to January 13, 2012
2012– 2015	General Hospital	Starr Manning; Kiki Jerome	Contract role: February 24, 2012, to March 20, 2013; Contract role: May 13, 2013, to February 16, 2015
2010	Law & Order: Los Angeles	Lily Renton	
2024	The Man in the Guest House	Ashley Burke	TV movie

== Awards and nominations ==
List of acting awards and nominations
Year	Award	Category	Work	Result	Ref.
2003	Young Artist Award	Best Performance in a TV Series (Comedy or Drama) - Young Actress Age Ten or Younger	One Life to Live	Nominated	
2005	Soap Opera Digest Award	Favorite Teen	One Life to Live	Won	
2008	Young Artist Award	Best Performance in a TV series - Recurring Young Actress	One Life to Live	Nominated	
2009	Young Artist Award	Best Performance in a TV Series - Recurring Young Actress	One Life to Live	Nominated	
2009	Young Artist Award	Outstanding Young Ensemble in a TV Series (shared with Eddie Alderson, Camila Banus, Carmen LoPorto and Austin Williams)	One Life to Live	Nominated	
2013	Daytime Emmy Award	Outstanding Younger Actress in a Drama Series	General Hospital	Won	
2014	Daytime Emmy Award	Outstanding Younger Actress in a Drama Series	General Hospital	Nominated	
2015	Daytime Emmy Award	Outstanding Younger Actress in a Drama Series	General Hospital	Nominated	
