= Terrell Tilford =

American actor (born 1969)

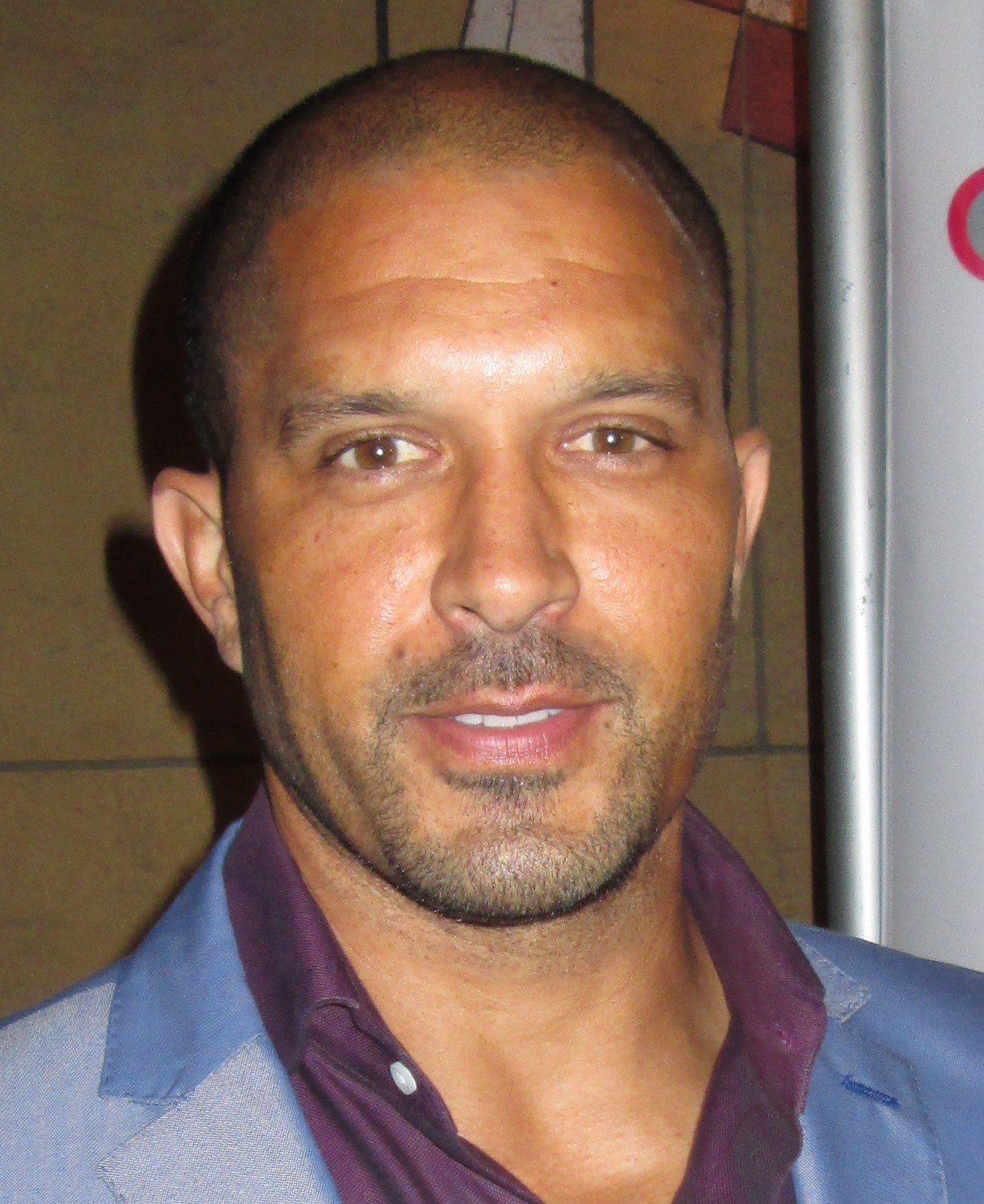
- Born: July 22, 1969 (age 56); Los Angeles, California, U.S.
- Education: University of California, Berkeley (BA); Rutgers University, New Brunswick (MFA)
- Occupation: Actor
- Years active: 1993–present
- Spouse: Victoria Platt (m. 2001)
- Children: 1
- Website: www.terrelltilford.com

Terrell Tilford (born July 22, 1969) is an American film, stage, and television actor best known for roles as Eric Bishop on Switched at Birth (2015–2017), David Grant on Guiding Light (1998–2001), as Greg Evans on One Life to Live (2009–2010), as Ramon Rush in the Lifetime drama series The Protector (2011), as Sean Clarke on the scripted series Single Ladies, and its recurring role as Malik on Soul Food for Showtime in 2004.

== Beginnings ==
Born in Los Angeles, California, Tilford is a classically trained actor who received a MFA in Theater from Rutgers University and a BA from the University of California at Berkeley.

== Television and film career ==
He is best known for his recurring roles on Showtime's Soul Food, as a mutated Klingon in Star Trek: Enterprise and for his recurring roles as Detective David Grant in Guiding Light from 1998 to 2001, and Dr. Bob Carrington on Days of Our Lives in 2008. Tilford was also in the cast of One Life to Live in the contract role of Dr. Greg Evans from June 2009 to November 2010.

Tilford's other television appearances include CSI: NY, Bones, Shark, Lincoln Heights (recurring), Girlfriends, All of Us (two-episode arc), Just Legal (recurring), Half & Half, My Wife & Kids,CSI: Crime Scene Investigation, The District, MDs (recurring), 24, and Cosby.

His film credits include Jackson, The DL Chronicles in the episode "Robert"; Jacob's Trouble; Serenity; Intersection; A Year and A Day; and A.I. Assault for the Sci-Fi Channel.

== Personal life ==
In 1998, Tilford met actress Victoria Platt as they worked opposite one another on Guiding Light. Tilford married actress Victoria Platt on September 29, 2001. The couple welcomed their daughter Marley, on August 24, 2014. On September 29, 2021, their 20th wedding anniversary, the couple announced their plans to divorce.

He is also a noted Art collector and artist himself.

== Filmography ==
=== Film ===
Year	Title	Role	Notes
2005	Intersection	Troy	Short
2005	Serenity	News Anchor	
2006	Jacob's Trouble	Omar Daniels	Short
2006	A.I. Assault	Mike Kirby	
2008	Jackson	Jeff	
2009	Dark House	Dark House	
2012	H4	Westmoreland	
2012	Broken Roads	Brian Pierson	
2013	The Get Away	Sylvester	Short
2014	Blackbird	Pastor Crandall	
2015	The Summoning	TJ	
2017	The Cheaters Club	Shawn	
2019	#Truth	Martin Jarett	

=== Television ===
Year	Title	Role	Notes
1993	Coach	Senior #3	Episode: "One for the Road"
1998–2001	Guiding Light	David Grant	Regular Cast
1999	Cosby	Mr. Lee	Episode: "The Vessy Method"
2002	MDs	Levy Hall	Recurring Cast
2002	24	Paul Wilson	Episode: "11:00 p.m.-12:00 a.m."
2003	The District	Raynel	Episode: "Free Byrd"
2004	Soul Food	Malik Todd	Recurring Cast: Season 5
2004	My Wife and Kids	Rama	Episode: "The Return of Bobby Shaw"
2004	CSI: Crime Scene Investigation	George Craven	Episode: "Viva Las Vegas"
2005	Star Trek: Enterprise	Marab	Episode: "Divergence" & "Affliction"
2005	Half & Half	Julian Houston	Episode: "The Big Pomp & Circumstance Episode"
2005	All of Us	Peyton Calhoun	Episode: "Legal Affairs: Part 1 & 2"
2006	Girlfriends	Michael Daniels	Episode: "I'll Be There for You... But Not Right Now"
2006	Just Legal	A.D.A. Steven Yeager	Episode: "The Heater"
2007	Lincoln Heights	Vice Principal Omar Caffey	Episode: "Manchild" & "Betrayal"
2007	Shark	Randal Hairston	Episode: "Blind Trust"
2007	CSI: NY	Dr. Quinn Brookman	Episode: "What Schemes May Come"
2007	The DL Chronicles	Robert Hall	Episode: "Robert"
2007	Bones	Dr. Kyle Aldridge	Episode: "Intern in the Incinerator"
2008	Days of Our Lives	Dr. Bob Carrington	Regular Cast
2009	24	Agent Reynolds	Episode: "Day 7: 8:00 p.m.-9:00 p.m."
2009	Maneater	Dr. Moore	Episode: "Part 2"
2009-10	One Life to Live	Greg Evans	Regular Cast
2011	NCIS	Navy Captain Jack Painter	Episode: "Dead Reflection"
2011	The Protector	Ramon 'Romeo' Rush	Main Cast
2012-14	Single Ladies	Sean Clarke	Recurring Cast: Season 2, Main Cast: Season 3
2014	CSI: Crime Scene Investigation	Adrian Graham	Episode: "Rubbery Homicide"
2014-16	The Young and the Restless	Dr. Barton Shelby	Regular Cast
2015	Agents of S.H.I.E.L.D.	Agent Hart	Episode: "Melinda"
2015	Castle	Hawthorne Carter	Episode: "The Nose"
2015-17	Switched at Birth	Eric Bishop	Recurring Cast: Season 4, Guest: Season 5
2016	Madam Secretary	Detective	Episode: "Invasive Species"
2016	Hit the Floor	Detective Curtis	Episode: "Carrying"
2017	Supergirl	Armek	Episode: "The Martian Chronicles"
2017	The Quad	Napoleon Brown	Episode: "Go Tell It on the Mountain"
2018	Criminal Minds	Commander David Nash	Episode: "Ex Parte"
2018	Lucifer	Robert Ertz	Episode: "Quintessential Deckerstar"
2019	For the People	Allison's Father	Episode: "Moral Suasion"
2020	Cherish the Day	Terrell	Episode: "Synthesis"
2020	Days of Our Lives	D.A. James Giddens	Episode: "Episode #1.13797" & "#1.13798"
2021	Magnum P.I.	Izzy Durrell	Episode: "First the Beatdown, Then the Blowback"
2022	Tales of the Jedi	Semage (voice)	Episode: "Choices"

== Theater career ==
- He played Pontius Pilate in the Black Dahlia Theatre production of The Last Days of Judas Iscariot;
- For his Geffen Playhouse debut as Darren Lemming in the West Coast premiere of Richard Greenberg's Tony Award-winning play Take Me Out, Tilford's performance was recognized by the Hollywood Reporter, the Daily Variety and the Los Angeles Times among several publications;
- Yellowman (original workshop production) at the McCarter Theatre;
- The Memorandum at The Guthrie (invited artist-in-residence experience);
- The Exonerated (original cast and Theatre LA Ovation Award nomination for Best Ensemble Performance) at The Actors' Gang;
- Malcolm X in El-Hajj Malik: Malcolm X at the National Black Arts Festival;
- The Rivals at Rutgers;
- Involuntary Homicide at The Actors' Gang;
- The African Company Presents Richard III at Rutgers;
- Prisoner of 2nd Avenue for the Fox Diversity Showcase;
- Dutchman at the Zoo Café;
- The Colored Museum at CalArts;
- Miss Julie at HERE (NY);
- Wait Until Dark at Rutgers;
- The LA Theater Works production of Stick Fly, opposite Justine Bateman, Dule Hill and Carl Lumbly.

== Awards / Nominated ==
In 2010, Tilford was nominated for a 41st NAACP Image Award as "Outstanding Actor in a Daytime Drama Series" for his role as Dr. Greg Evans on ABC's One Life to Live.
