= Paul Ryan (As the World Turns) =

Fictional character on As the World Turns

- As the World Turns character
- Roger Howarth as Paul Ryan
- Portrayed by: Canaan Crouch (1980); Danny Pintauro (1983–84); Elden Ratliff (1984–85); Christopher Daniel Barnes (1985–86); Damon Scheller (1986); Andrew Kavovit (1986–92, 2000–01); John Howard (1996); Scott Holroyd (2001–03); Roger Howarth (2003–10) (and others)
- Duration: 1980–92; 1996; 2000–10
- First appearance: 1980
- Last appearance: September 17, 2010
- Created by: Bridget and Jerome Dobson
- Introduced by: Mary-Ellis Bunim
In-universe information
- Other names: Paul Colfax; Paul Stenbeck
- Occupation: Former Owner of WorldWide Industries; Former Chief Financial Officer of BRO; Former Owner of an Internet company Former Employee of Montgomery & Associates
- Parents: James Stenbeck; Barbara Ryan
- Adoptive parents: Raymond Colfax; Claudia Colfax
- Half-brothers: David Stenbeck; Henry Coleman; Jordan Sinclair; Will Munson; Johnny Dixon
- Half-sisters: Jennifer Munson
- Spouse: Rosanna Cabot (2004–05, 2007–08); Emily Stewart (2006, 2009–); Meg Snyder (2008–09)
- Daughters: Jennifer Ryan; Eliza Ryan
- Grandfathers: Chuck Ryan
- Grandmothers: Greta Aldrin; Jennifer Sullivan
- Uncles: Rick Ryan
- Aunts: Ariel Aldrin; Melinda Grey; Frannie Hughes
- Nephews: Cabot Sinclair; Johnny Montgomery
- Nieces: Hallie Munson (adoptive)
- Other relatives: Kim Sullivan Hughes; Andrew Dixon; Sabrina Hughes; Christopher Hughes II; Hope Dixon

Paul Ryan is a fictional character from the CBS daytime soap opera As the World Turns. The role was last portrayed by Roger Howarth from July 7, 2003 to September 17, 2010.

== Casting ==
The role was originated by Canaan Crouch, the real-life son of Colleen Zenk and her former husband for several months in 1980. Later, three other child actors took over the role, including Danny Pintauro. Pintauro debuted in January 1983 and last appeared on February 10, 1984 and was quickly replaced by Elden Ratliff on February 13, 1984. Ratliff departed from the series in January 1985 and C. B. Barnes stepped into the role the following month; Barnes last appeared in January 1986. Damon Scheller stepped into the role in February 1986 on a recurring basis and last appeared in October 1986. In November 1986, Andrew Kavovit stepped into the role when the character was SORASed to age 16. In 1990, Kavovit earned the Daytime Emmy award in the Outstanding Younger Actor category for his portrayal of Paul. Kavovit last appeared on the series in October 1991, with a brief appearance in 1992 before returning to the role on a year contract from July 2000 to April 2001. Actor John Howard stepped into the role briefly in 1996 but was quickly let go. In May 2001, it was announced that Scott Holroyd was cast in the role of Paul. Holroyd began taping in June and made his first appearance on July 10, 2001. Kevin Stapleton, known for his role as One Life to Live's Kevin Buchanan was also considered for the role. In March 2003, Holyroyd confirmed in an interview with TV Guide that he was departing from the series. Holroyd made his last appearance on May 13, 2003. Following the announcement about Holroyd's departure, rumors began circulating that Daytime Emmy winner Roger Howarth, known for his role as One Life to Live's Todd Manning was being considered for the role. In May 2003, after several weeks of speculation, CBS confirmed that Howarth had signed on to play Paul Ryan and Howarth made his first appearance on July 7, 2003.

=== Series finale ===
In the show's final episode, which aired September 17, 2010, Paul and Barbara amicably dissolved their business partnership at Worldwide Industries, marking the end of their long-running professional rivalry. Paul's relationship with Emily Stewart was depicted as stable at the series' end.

== Storylines ==
=== 1980–1991 ===
Born in 1977, Paul Ryan spent the first three years of his life raised by Claudia and Raymond Colfax, when he was placed into the care of his biological parents, James Stenbeck and Barbara Ryan. With James and Barbara's marriage a largely unhappy one, the two soon divorced, and Paul was denied access to James. He would lash out at Barbara's fiancee, Gunnar St. Clair, blaming him for his parents divorce, which James encouraged. One day, James abducted Paul and took him to Cheyenne, Wyoming. After seeing a news broadcast about his abduction, Paul came to realize that James was a liar, but upon his father's presumed death, he returned to idolizing James and resenting Barbara's hatred of him.

== See also ==
- Paul Ryan and Meg Snyder
