= Victoria Platt =

American actress

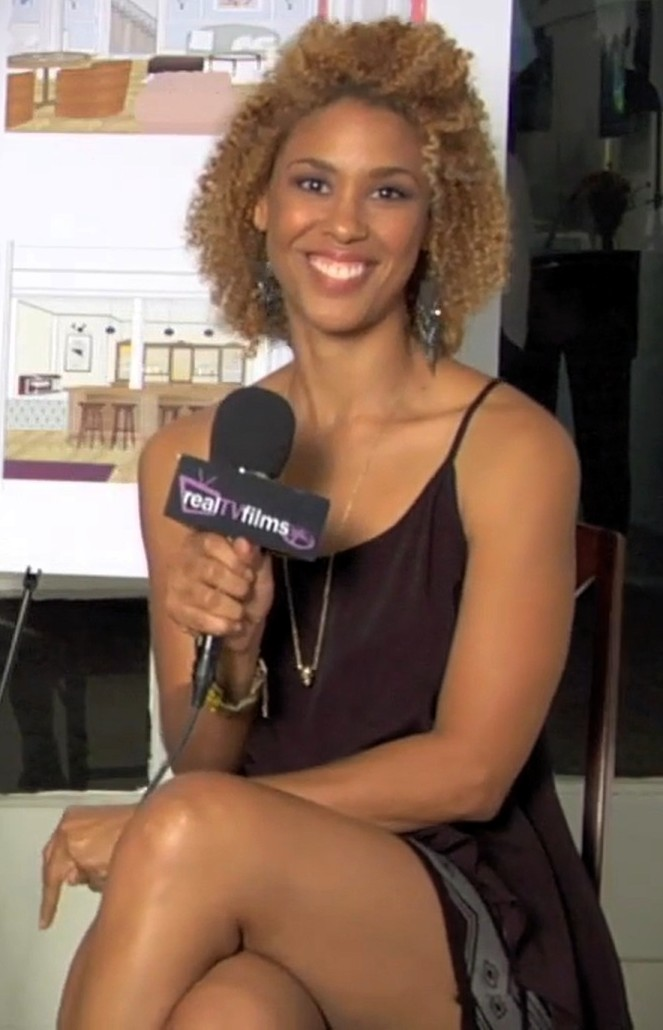
- Platt in 2014
- Born: November 21, 1972 (age 53); Queens, New York, U.S.
- Occupation: Actress
- Years active: 1985–present
- Spouse: Terrell Tilford (m. 2001)
- Children: 1
- Website: victoriaplatt.com/about

Victoria Platt (born November 21, 1972) is an American actress.

== Career ==
Platt began her career appearing in an episode of NBC sitcom The Cosby Show in 1985 and the following year made her big screen debut in the musical drama film Round Midnight starring Dexter Gordon. On Broadway, Platt appeared opposite Gregory Hines in Jelly's Last Jam, and starred in the musical Sammy as Sammy Davis Jr.'s wife, Altovise. She was nominated for an NAACP Theatre Award for Opening Doors and Hope Runs Eternal, and nominated for an Ovation Award for the hip-hop musical Venice (2013).

On television, Platt played Josephine Baker in the HBO film Winchell in 1998. She starred as Vicky Spaulding in the CBS daytime soap opera Guiding Light from October 1998 through summer 2001. Platt later guest-starred on CSI: Miami, Crossing Jordan, Strong Medicine, Castle, Criminal Minds and Lucifer. In 2010, she was a regular cast member in the ABC series The Gates. In 2014, she had a recurring role in the CW series Star-Crossed. She appeared in three NCIS series five times: NCIS, NCIS: Los Angeles and NCIS: New Orleans, playing three different roles.

From 2020 to 2021, Platt had a recurring role as Dr. Amanda Raynor in the NBC daytime soap opera Days of Our Lives, for which she was nominated for a Daytime Emmy Award for Outstanding Guest Performer in a Drama Series at the 48th Daytime Emmy Awards.

== Personal life ==
Platt was born in Queens, New York. She married actor Terrell Tilford in 2001, and they have one child born in 2014. They separated in 2021. On September 29, 2021, Tilford shared on Instagram. “Today was our 20th anniversary and marks our final year of marriage. Victoria beat me to the idea that we should have dinner together to celebrate and honor us… and it was wonderful. And she ate everything… okay, we both did.”
