= Victor Lord, Jr. =

- One Life to Live character
- Portrayed by: Trevor St. John; Roger Howarth (2011)
- Duration: 2003–13
- First appearance: May 20, 2003
- Last appearance: May 14, 2013
- Created by: Michael Malone, Josh Griffith and Ron Carlivati; (Note: The character was conceived as a recast of the Todd Manning character in 2003 under head writers Michael Malone and Josh Griffith. In 2011, head writer Ron Carlivati retconned the Todd recast into an entirely separate character, that of Todd's identical twin brother Victor, Jr.)
- Introduced by: Frank Valentini; (Note: Executive producer Valentini notably introduced St. John in the recast of Todd from Roger Howarth's portrayal and in 2011 retconned St. John's Todd to Todd's twin, Victor Lord, Jr.)
In-universe information
- Other names: Walker Laurence; Todd Manning
- Family: Lord
- Father: Victor Lord
- Mother: Irene Manning
- Brothers: Todd Manning
- Sisters: Tina Lord
- Half-brothers: Tony Lord
- Half-sisters: Victoria Lord; Meredith Lord
- Spouse: Blair Cramer (2003–04, 2007–08) (under alias Todd Manning); Téa Delgado (2009, 2010–)
- Sons: Sam Manning; Victor Lord III (stillborn)
- Stepdaughters: Danielle Manning
- Grandparents: Albert Manning
- Aunts and uncles: Powell Lord; Gwendolyn Lord Abbott
- Nieces and nephews: Megan Gordon; Brian Kendall; Daniel Wolek; Kevin Buchanan; Joey Buchanan; Jessica Buchanan; Natalie Buchanan; C. J. Roberts; Sarah Roberts; Starr Manning; Danielle Manning; Jack Manning
- First cousins: Clayton-Powell Lord II; Richard Abbott; Powell Lord III (once removed)

Victor Lord, Jr. is a fictional character on the American soap opera, One Life to Live (OLTL). He is the son of Victor Lord and Irene Manning. He is known for his nonchalant charisma, dry, smart, wit, and unpredictable, volatile nature. He came to town in 2003, claiming to be Todd Manning after extensive plastic surgery. Victor spent the next eight years living in Llanview as Todd Manning. In August 2011, it is revealed that he is Todd's twin brother, who had been brainwashed into believing he was Todd Manning.

As Todd, Victor quickly made an enemy in police detective John McBain. Victor was protective his "children", but sometimes his good intentions resulted in tragic accidents. Victor was aggressive and prone to outbursts, which would sometimes backfire on him. Tea Delgado, Todd's ex-wife, proved to be the love of Victor's life, and they got married. Victor's true identity was alluded to when Tea, suffering from drugs that made her believe she had a brain tumor, pointed at a photograph of her and Todd, and declared that Victor was not Todd.

On May 29, 2006, in what the soap opera section of the website Soaps She Knows described as "one of the most memorable moments" for OLTL, and "breathtaking, nerve-racking, heart wrenching", St. John portrayed Todd being executed for a crime he did not commit. At the last moment, after the lethal injection has been administered, John McBain rushes in, declaring Todd's innocence, with proof: the woman Todd is accused of killing (Margaret Cochran) is at his side, clearly still alive. Todd is revived soon afterward. During the execution episode, a montage lasting a little over four minutes in length, was shown while a song played in the background. The song was called "Forsaken" (or "Todd's Song") and was written by Michal Towber especially for the show. The montage included reaction shots of those witnessing the execution, shots of his "daughter" Starr crying in the presence of a lynch mob outside the prison, and flashbacks of Todd's children and of her mother, Blair Cramer, during both St. John and Howarth's tenures as Todd, with Howarth's face unseen. The scenes were called "unbearable" by viewers, and their responses were varied. Much of the audience was infuriated by Blair's unwillingness to believe that Todd was innocent. Many viewers thought that Todd's death was permanent; Soap Opera Digest speculated that this was due to limited Internet access or to a lack of interest in spoilers.

Although fans and St. John's co-workers felt that he deserved an Emmy nomination for his death row performances, he did not receive one, but OLTL received a nomination for Outstanding Drama Series by submitting the episode. One soap opera website criticized St. John's Emmy snub, stating that it was incongruous that the show's Best Show nomination was due in large part to St. John's performance. Soap opera commentators Nelson Branco and Michael Fairman called St. John's execution performances the best on any daytime drama in the early 2000s. Towber and other composers for the show were nominated for Outstanding Achievement in Music Direction and Composition for a Drama Series.

In May 2011, the real Todd Manning arrives in Llanview with his "old face", after escaping from the top-secret CIA facility where he had been held captive for the last eight years. He is unable to prove to everyone that he is the real Todd Manning, causing chaos and confusion, shaking his family to its core. DNA tests on both come back positive when aligned with an untainted sample on file from the rape kit taken after Todd instigated the gang rape of Marty Saybrooke in the 1990s.

The truth comes out when John McBain, Brody Lovett, and Tomás Delgado raid the CIA facility and discover that Todd's presumed-dead mother, Irene Manning, is the head of a rogue CIA agency. Back in Llanview, Irene confirms that the man with the scar is Todd Manning, and the other, who had been living there as Todd, is really Victor Lord, Jr. In 2003, Irene had ordered a hit on the real Todd Manning to keep him from exposing the agency. She had Todd strapped to a chair and made him uncover every detail of his life. She originally gave Victor Todd's trademark scar, but then had Victor's face altered with reconstructive surgery to make him look like Mitch Laurence's long-lost brother, Flynn Walker Laurence. Irene then sent Victor away in Todd's place, so that he could get his share of the inheritance as Victor Lord Sr.'s heir, and unknowingly help the agency. She kept the real Todd locked up, instead of following through with the original plan to kill him. In March 2011, Irene ordered a hit on Victor, then still believing he was Todd Manning. He was shot in the stomach by a sniper after refusing to do more dirty work and went into a coma.

The day after the truth is revealed, and Victor gains acceptance from his family, Victor is supposedly shot dead by an unknown assailant and is shown dying from his injuries with his wife, Téa, at his side. Shortly after, it is revealed by a blocked memory that Todd is the one who supposedly shot him, and Todd tries to cover it up. On the series finale, as Todd is being arrested for his murder, Victor is revealed to be alive, bound and gagged on a bed, and being held hostage by Allison Perkins.

In April 2013, Victor reappears in Llanview after Danielle overdoses on oxycontin at the opening of Blair's new nightclub, Shelter. After Todd lambasts Téa for her failure to see Danielle's troubled behavior, Victor arrives and begins to assault Todd at the hospital. Victor's nieces, nephews, and children were thrilled to have Victor back in their lives. Victor learned from Tea that they had a stillborn son, whom Todd had switched with another baby. Victor was angry at Todd for causing Tea so much pain, so he took revenge by poisoning Todd's supply of alcohol. Todd approached Victor with a truce, and Victor accepted, so he replaced the tainted alcohol in Todd's room with a new, untainted one. Soon after, Victor announced that he had to leave town to keep Tea and his kids safe. On his way out, he stopped by to see Todd and told him that he had to leave town, and asked Todd to keep their family safe as well. Todd blasted Victor for leaving and breaking the kids' hearts all over again, and Victor punched Todd in the throat, grabbed him by the throat and choked him unconscious, and told him that he had poisoned him, before leaving.

Once Victor's crimes were exposed, the police wanted to bring him in. Téa, whom Victor had been e-mailing, agreed to help them find Victor, believing he would be safer in jail than on the run. However, Todd wanted payback and planned to kill Victor, so he hired an assassin, who was killed. Victor escaped and contacted Téa, telling her they could not have any more contact. Later, the mastermind behind Victor's initial abduction, Carl Peterson, revealed that he had captured Victor again and that he was being guarded by Allison, who was revealed to be Carl's sister.
