= Starr Manning =

Fictional character from One Life to Live

- One Life to Live character
- Kristen Alderson as Starr Manning
- Portrayed by: Ariella and Natalie Jamnik (1996–98); Meghan Rayder (1998); Kristen Alderson (1998–2013)
- Duration: 1996–2013
- First appearance: January 8, 1996
- Last appearance: March 20, 2013
- Created by: Michael Malone
- Introduced by: Susan Bedsow Horgan (1996); Jill Farren Phelps (1998); Frank Valentini (2012)
- Crossover appearances: General Hospital
In-universe information
- Occupation: Student at Port Charles University (2013); Co-owner of The Haunted Star (2013); Singer; Llanfair estate trustee
- Family: Lord; Cramer
- Father: Todd Manning
- Mother: Blair Cramer
- Brothers: Jack Manning
- Half-brothers: Brendan Thornhart; Sam Manning (adoptive)
- Half-sisters: Danielle Manning
- Daughters: Hope Manning-Thornhart
- Grandparents: Victor Lord; Irene Manning; Addie Cramer; Peter Manning (adoptive); Barbara Jones (adoptive)
- Aunts and uncles: Tony Lord; Victoria Lord; Meredith Lord; Tina Lord; Victor Lord Jr.
- First cousins: Megan Gordon; Brian Kendall; Daniel Wolek; Kevin Buchanan; Joey Buchanan; Jessica Buchanan; Natalie Buchanan; C. J. Roberts; Sarah Roberts; Sam Manning
- Other relatives: Dorian Lord; Langston Wilde (adoptive)

Starr Manning is a fictional character from the daytime drama One Life to Live. Born onscreen on January 8, 1996, the role was initially portrayed by infant children. In 1998, Starr was rapidly aged when young actress Kristen Alderson debuted in the childhood role, which retconned the character's birth year to 1992. Following the cancellation of One Life to Live and its conclusion in 2012, Alderson carried the role over to ABC's last remaining soap opera, General Hospital, winning a Daytime Emmy Award for Outstanding Younger Actress in a Drama Series for the portrayal in 2013. Alderson is the second One Life to Live actor after Gerald Anthony (Marco Dane) to win an Emmy for a crossover role to General Hospital.

Starr is the oldest child of Todd Manning and Blair Cramer. Starr is one of the only characters biologically related to both longtime One Life to Live rivals Victoria Lord and Dorian Cramer Lord. The character's most significant storylines featured her dealing with her parents' volatile relationship, her early adolescent friendship with Matthew Buchanan, portrayed by Alderson's real-life brother, Eddie Alderson, and her close friendship with Langston Wilde, as well as her romantic relationships with Cole Thornhart and James Ford on One Life to Live and Michael Corinthos on General Hospital.

== Casting and creation ==
The role of Starr was originated by child actors, Ariella and Natalie Jamnik who appeared in the role from in January 1996 upon the character's birth onscreen. The Jamnik sisters departed from the series in January 1998 and Meghan Rayder briefly appeared in the role throughout February 1998. Kristen Alderson first made her debut in the role of Starr Manning on March 20, 1998, on One Life to Live. After a 3-year stint, in April 2001, Alderson signed a 5-year contract making her at the time the youngest performer in daytime television to appear in a contract role. In the spring of 2009, rumors began to circulate that Alderson was about to leave the series due to her not getting along with co-star, Brandon Buddy who played Cole Thornhart. However, Alderson later revealed in an interview that both rumors were completely false.

Upon the serial's cancellation, it was announced that production company Prospect Park would continue production of the series, along with ABC's other cancelled soap opera All My Children as web series. In October 2011, it was reported that Alderson was in negotiations to continue with the soap opera online. However, Soaps In Depth later confirmed that Alderson and her brother, Eddie, had declined the offer to continue with the series, and would be relocating to California. Two days before the airing of One Life to Live's series finale on ABC, the network announced that Alderson, and several other co-stars including her onscreen parents Kassie DePaiva and Roger Howarth would be reprising their roles on the last remaining ABC soap opera, General Hospital.

Alderson began taping her first scenes on January 27 and several days later revealed through Twitter that she had signed a three-year deal. It was then announced that Van Hughes would briefly reprise his role as Cole. Alderson would make her first appearance during the week of February 20, with her and Hughes first appearing on February 24.

In January 2013, news broke that Alderson and other One Life to Live co-stars who had been airing on General Hospital were to depart or "at least temporarily exit". One Life to Live was in the process of being brought back by Prospect Park's The Online Network, and according to Zap2it, "Prospect Park realizes these three characters could initially help draw fans to the new One Life [...] There are ongoing talks between ABC and Prospect Park about the characters returning to General Hospital at some point, which could be fine with [Prospect Park] as they eventually want to go much younger with their soaps." However, it was confirmed that Starr would not appear on either soap opera until a contractual agreement is signed. At the time, Prospect Park owned the rights to all One Life to Live characters; TV Guide reported that because ABC does not want to risk any further legal disputes with Prospect Park concerning the characters, the only way to avoid such disputes may be to have the former One Life to Live actors portray "characters that in no way resemble the current ones" in order to stay on General Hospital. As a result, Alderson made her final appearance as Starr on General Hospital on March 20, 2013. She later returned to the series in May as Kiki Jerome.

== Development ==
=== Characterization ===
A blend of her legendary parents' (One Life to Live’s Todd Manning and Blair Cramer) best and worst qualities, Starr is a willful young woman plagued by the trauma of the deaths of her first love and their child.

As a child, Starr is known for her mischievous behavior, exacerbated by her parents' chaotic relationship. Still as strong-willed as ever, Starr nonetheless settles down during her teen years. Alderson described Starr as being very stubborn when she does not get things her way or when someone goes against what she honestly believes is right; very much like her parents. "When Starr was younger, she was a brat and if she wanted something, she would fight until she got it," Alderson said. Though Starr mellows out during her teen years, a 2010 storyline in which another girl threatens her relationship with Cole forces the character to revert to her old ways. Alderson said, "Lately, we haven't seen that side of her because it hasn't had to come out. The fans were missing that spunk and backbone, so they'll be excited to see Starr back in her element. She's going to fight for what she believes in." In a 2009 interview, Michael Fairman highlighted that Starr changed a lot after becoming a teenage mother. Alderson said that the storyline helped her mature personally, and also allowed the maturation of the character. Starr shares similarities with both her parents. Very much like her mother, when Starr is very distraught, she leans on the nearest man. This is displayed on two separate occasions when Starr falls for other guys due to her relationship with Cole being in shambles.

=== Musical element ===
In 2007, the series produced "Prom Night: The Musical", a number of musical episodes focusing on the Llanview high school prom. Cole and Starr are the center of attention as it features songs performed by Alderson, Buddy and several other cast members. The episodes began airing on June 15 and concluded on June 20, 2007. The cast members also appeared ABC's The View for a performance of the song, "We Belong" written by Pat Benatar. In 2008, after forgetting Starr's 16th birthday, her family throws her a surprise birthday bash featuring R&B superstar, Mary J. Blige. In 2010, the series produced a sequel to the original musical, named "Starr X'd Lovers" to coincide with May Sweeps. Within the series, the title is actually a musical written by Starr's best friend, Langston (Brittany Underwood), based on Cole and Starr's love story. According to head-writer Ron Carlivati, the night is very significant for Starr as it is her senior prom. Though the original musical focused mainly on Starr and Cole, the 2010 revival featured more characters allowing Alderson to share her performance of Benatar's "We Belong" with co-stars, Underwood, Kelley Missal (Danielle Manning) and Meghann Fahy (Hannah O'Connor). Alderson performed on eight of the nine songs featured in the episodes. Some critics accused the series of trying to "rip off" the very successful Disney franchise, High School Musical and the Fox musical series, Glee. Alderson defended One Life stating that the show had always had a rich musical history, and that what set them apart from the things they were being compared to was the unique characters and storylines.

In summer, 2011, One Life to Live returned to musical themes for the character of Starr by having her develop a friendship with college DJ Baz Moreau (Barret Helms). The two began writing and recording music together, much to the dismay of her then-boyfriend, James (Nic Robuck). The relationship is complicated even further when Baz suddenly kisses Starr and she rejects him. When Baz wants to sign a record contract with former adult film producer turned music mogul, Rick Powers (Austin Peck); Starr is hesitant due to his part in blackmailing James's ex-girlfriend, Deanna Forbes (Nafessa Williams) into doing a porn scene with her sister Danielle's boyfriend, Nate Salinger (Lenny Platt). Alderson as Starr later shot a music video for the song featuring James. Rick, fearing Starr's original video was not racy enough capitalizes on Starr's recent arrest for helping Todd (Howarth) escape jail, and convinces her to record the song "Jail Bait" and another video featuring Nate fueling rumors that they are having sex.

=== Cole Thornhart ===
Alderson with costar Brandon Buddy as Cole and Starr in 2010

In the fall of 2006, Brandon Buddy made his first appearance as Cole Thornhart creating a Romeo and Juliet-esque story as Todd raped Cole's mother, Marty Saybrooke (Susan Haskell) in college. Early on in their relationship, the couple faces off with the mean girl, Britney Jennings (originally Katrina Bowden, then Portia Reiners) who sets out to ruin Starr after Cole rejects her in favor of Starr; Britney's torture starts with teasing Starr about her parents. Britney goes so far as to dose Cole with steroids which leads to him attacking Starr at a party. With everything in the world against them, Starr and Cole realize their love for one another on prom night in 2007. Starr does her best to comfort a grieving Cole when Marty (Christina Chambers) is "killed" in an explosion. This causes tension between Starr and Langston who believes she can understand Cole more because she has dealt with losing her parents. Starr does not like that Langston thinks she knows Cole better than she [Starr] does and becomes a bit overprotective. According to Alderson's costar, Brittany Underwood (Langston), "Starr hates not being able to relate or understand the way Langston can understand Cole." Starr also feels left out when Langston and Cole must attend grief counseling sessions together. "Your best friend and your boyfriend, the two people you hang out with most in your life, all of a sudden start hanging out together and you're not allowed to be with them or talk to them about it."

==== Teen pregnancy ====
"I'm Starr's age and I'm definitely not ready... Think about sex and decide how important it is to you.... You can always say 'no,' even if you've said 'yes' before — it's your decision."

— Kristen Alderson on Starr's decision to have sex

In 2008, One Life to Live launched a storyline featuring Starr focusing on teen pregnancy as part of The National Campaign to Prevent Teen and Unplanned Pregnancy. Despite disapproval from some fans — as well as Starr's father, Todd — Starr and Cole have sex for the first time in March 2008. To coincide with the storyline, Alderson started a blog on the official ABC Daytime website in which she discussed her take on the storyline, and the issues of teen sex and pregnancy, and Starr's choices, as well the consequences of those choices. Alderson's blog launched on March 7, 2008. ABC previously partnered with the campaign for the teen pregnancy storyline featuring Starr's cousin, Jessica Buchanan (Erin Torpey) in 1998 and Lulu Spencer (Julie Marie Berman) in 2006. Alderson discussed the storyline in an issue of Seventeen:

17: What is the show trying to do through the teen pregnancy story line?

[W]e just really hope to get parents and teenagers talking about [teen pregnancy] because it happens to 750,000 teenage girls every year. The statistics are insane! So just to get people to be like, You know, I should have a plan before I have sex. Starr didn’t use protection when she had sex, because she got very caught up in the moment and everything, and that happens to a lot of people. So, we’re just trying to say, Well, this is what happened to Starr, this is what she’s dealing with — think about it and talk about it and bring it into your own life.

17: Did Starr ever expect she would get pregnant at 16?

You know, it’s funny, because Starr had a line where she goes, "You know, I was always in the classroom when they were talking about safe sex, and I would look around at all the other kids and say, 'I wonder who’s going to be the one to not listen to these lectures, 'cause it’s definitely not going to be me,' ” and it was her. Everyone thinks, That won’t happen to me, I only had sex one time without protection, it’s not going to happen, and it could, and it does — to a whole lot of teenagers.

In an interview with Soap Central's Dan J. Kroll, Alderson described the plot as being "a very adult storyline… It's a very big issue and we feel very honored to be doing such a powerful storyline and hopefully educate some viewers about teenage pregnancy because it's a very big issue and it [can be] scary." In January 2009, Soap Opera Digest conducted an interview with Amy Kramer, the director of Entertainment Media for the campaign. Kramer discussed the campaign's history with ABC and also gave some facts about the storyline:

Because it [One Life to Live]'s a soap opera, the producers have the luxury of telling it in real time. Starr was pregnant for 37 weeks on ONE LIFE [in 2008]. The audience saw her dealing with so many of the things that girls in her situation deal with — finding out she's pregnant, telling the first friend, trying to keep it from her parents, [deciding] how she and her boyfriend were going to deal with it, how it will impact their relationship, and the way she felt when her body started changing. If it's just an hour-long drama, a lot of the nuances are left out.

==== Baby switch and Schuyler Joplin ====
Starr's decision to put the child up for adoption and the child's supposed "death" eventually drives the couple apart. By 2009, Cole is struggling with a drug addiction and Starr's attempts to help him deal start to bring them closer together. For May Sweeps, Starr's storyline involves the investigation into her late daughter, Hope's mysterious death. Starr finally learns the truth [that her child was switched at birth by her cousin Jessica (Bree Williamson)'s alternate personality, Bess, when Jessica's baby is stillborn] and she is finally reunited with daughter. However, Starr is now faced with a tough decision, "Do I keep her? Or, do I still give her to Marcie (Kathy Brier)?" Brier and her costar Chris Stack who portrayed Marcie's husband, Michael were about to leave the show, leaving fans to wonder if they would be taking Hope with them. The reveal also coincides with Llanview High school's annual prom and Alderson revealed that Starr and Cole finally get the chance to be teenagers again. However, "they can’t take their minds off of it, because their daughter is being exhumed that night." Starr is also kidnapped by one of Todd's enemies, Zach Rosen forcing Blair to exchange her freedom for Starr's.

"I think maybe something will develop after all the drama dies down; with him going through so much, and her going through so much, and going through so much together. They have really realized that they need each other to help one another out. They’re realizing they are working better as a team than alone. I don’t really know if it’s anything romantic, quite yet. They are putting that on hold while they have so much to deal with."

— Alderson, on Starr and Cole's potential reunion.

During Starr's time away from Cole, she develops a crush on her biology teacher, Schuyler Joplin (Scott Clifton), the son of the woman who delivered baby Hope, the late Dr. Leah Joplin (Maureen Mueller). Alderson revealed that when her character suddenly begins falling for Schuyler, she is on the rebound because she is missing Cole. "[Cole] was her best friend, and she wanted to be with him so bad. Langston is her best friend, but at the same time, Cole was going through terrible times like Starr was." Starr knows she and Cole can't bet together because they both are dealing with their own individual issues, so she goes and finds someone else, Schuyler, and projects her feelings for Cole onto him. Alderson stated that Starr's attraction to her teacher developed "out of desperation." Schuyler helps her realize that the feelings they had for one another were not real, as they were both on the rebound from failed relationships.

==== Hannah and James ====
In the spring of 2010, Starr does not have a date to prom because Cole is in prison. At the time, Cole and Starr's relationship is being threatened by Cole's college lab partner, the crazed Hannah O'Connor (Meghann Fahy). Alderson describes Starr's life as being blown apart. Starr and Cole at the time are juggling being parents finishing high school, and their lives appear to be "settling down," — enter Hannah. "She spills coffee on herself with Cole, and then Todd, my dad, walks in on the two of them. Something innocent gets blown out of proportion, and then when Marty's pushed down the stairs, Cole automatically thinks it's Todd. It's been upsetting for Starr." Carlivati stated Hannah as being a "real problem." Cole's incarceration for his brutal attack on "Todd" allows for the introduction of another love interest, James (Nic Robuck), the younger brother of Robert Ford (David A. Gregory), the man Langston is cheating on Markko with. When James and Starr are forced to go on the run together, they fall for one another very quickly. When asked if Starr would get revenge on Hannah for interfering with her relationship with Cole, Alderson revealed that Starr is more focused on whether Cole will be able to make it to the prom. Starr's trust in her father, "Todd" (Trevor St. John) that Hannah is responsible for Cole's mother, Marty miscarriage, while Cole blames "Todd" thanks to Hannah's accusations. When asked if the couple would make it past the next obstacle, Alderson explained, though they love one another and they still have a connection, Cole's friendship with Hannah is what tears them apart. Cole taking Hannah's side when Marty miscarries only makes matters worse. Starr knows Hannah intends to win Cole for herself forcing Starr to fight for Cole. According to Alderson, Cole and Starr are forced to grow up very fast, while their parents continue acting like children, in order to deal with all the issues they face, including the tension between their parents, and becoming teenage parents. Despite them being forced into adulthood, Starr sees their senior prom as sort of a full-circle event, because prom is where it all began for them. In late 2010, it is announced that Brandon Buddy would be departing from the series with his character, Cole being sent back to prison for violating his probation. Alderson compares her attraction to James to her prior attraction to Schuyler; because Cole is going to be in jail for the next several years, Starr leans on James. Alderson revealed that James being around Starr's age would be a real threat to her relationship with Cole "because unlike Schuyler, this is what James wants. Schuyler did not want to get with Starr at any point. He felt feelings for her like a friend. He cared about her, but James not only cares about Starr; he really does have feelings for her and wants to be with her." Starr ends her relationship with Cole in early 2011 and soon begins dating James. The relationship is quickly threatened with the introduction of James's ex-girlfriend, Deanna and Starr's music producer, Baz Moreau. Baz seems to have feelings for Starr, but she quickly rejects him because she is dating James. After causing a bit of trouble for the couple, and breaking up Starr's sister Danielle's relationship with Nate, Deena leaves town. Upon the serial's cancellation, many began speculate that Cole would return to the series in time for the finale. However, the show is forced to abandon those plans and quickly recast the role with actor Van Hughes due to Buddy being unable to continue taping.

=== Losing Cole and Hope ===
Upon Alderson's introduction as Starr on General Hospital, it was assumed by fans and critics that Starr would be paired with Michael Corinthos (Chad Duell). However, many wondered what would happen to Cole and Hope. Viewers are shocked in late February when Starr survives a fatal car accident that kills Cole and Hope. Alderson responded to the decision on Twitter urging fans not to blame head-writer Ron Carlivati revealing that both Buddy and Hughes were unavailable to continue in the role of Cole. Alderson promised her fans that the storyline would definitely lead to greater possibilities for Starr. Starr goes on the war path when Michael's father, Sonny is arrested in connection to the shooting which led to the car accident. At the time, Michael is also grieving the loss of his girlfriend, and according to Alderson he is the "only person that could really understand what Starr is going through."

== Storylines ==
=== 1996–2005 ===
Upon birth, baby Starr is kidnapped by her presumed dead father to make her mother after finding her with another man. When Starr is diagnosed with aplastic anemia Alex Olanov willingly donates her bone marrow to save her life. When Todd returns from being on the run, he and Starr team up and successfully ruin Blair's marriage to Max Holden. Starr becomes a big sister in 2001 when her parents adopt a little boy named, Jack who is later revealed to be her biological brother. In 2003, Starr is kidnapped by Mitch Laurence and Blair exchanges her freedom for Starr's. When Starr and Jack are sent to Atlanta for their own safety, Starr steals her cousin Cassie’s credit card and finds her way back to Llanview. Blair is now dating Mitch's brother, Walker and Walker reveals that he is actually Todd with plastic surgery. Later, Todd is sentenced to prison when Blair falsely accuses him of rape; Starr and friend, Matthew find the prison van during transport and try to set Todd free only for Matthew to be kidnapped by Troy McIver. Though Matthew is rescued, Starr is sentenced to community service at the hospital. Starr meets Travis O’Connell in a chat room and tricks Blair into going to meet him in New York City where the teens run off together. Starr is later kidnapped and held for ransom by Laser. She is rescued and returns home; Travis soon follows and Todd reluctantly allows Starr to see him. The teens later use the family newspaper, The Banner to print malicious information about Starr's cousin, and Todd's rival, Kevin Buchanan. Starr and Travis would share their first kiss before he must go back to New York with his family. When Todd disappears, Blair begins dating Dr. Spencer Truman despite Starr's disapproval. Todd is later sentenced to death for the murder of Margaret Cochran and her unborn child. He flatlines after lethal injection only to be revived it is proved that Margaret faked her death.

=== 2006–12 ===
Starr befriends Langston Wilde when she fakes amnesia in order to get her parents back together. They soon start high school where Starr makes enemies with Britney Jennings when football player Cole Thornhart rejects her for Starr. Britney slips steroids into Cole's drink at a party leading to him attacking Starr. Despite disapproval of their parents, Starr and Cole refuse to stop seeing one another. Starr does her best to comfort a grieving Cole when his mother Marty Saybrooke appears to be killed in a car explosion. Meanwhile, Todd and Blair remarry to gain custody of his son, Sam, from Michael and Marcie McBain. Todd suddenly wants to move the family to Hawaii prompting Cole and Starr to have sex for the first time; they are caught by Todd who beats Cole to near incapacitation. When Starr learns she is pregnant, after contemplating an abortion, the couple runs away together where they plan to raise the baby. They are found and forced to go back home where Starr ultimately decides let Michael and Marcie adopt the baby, much to the dismay of Todd and Cole. The baby dies shortly after birth. It later revealed that Todd planned to kidnap the child and raise it with an amnesiac Marty, who is alive, and Todd is put on trial. With encouragement from her former stepmother, Téa Delgado, Starr changes her statement allowing for Todd be exonerated, driving a bigger wedge between her and Cole. On the rebound from Cole, Starr briefly develops feelings for her teacher, Schuyler Joplin. The truth is revealed about the baby switch and the teens are allowed to raise their child, Hope, when Marcie changes her mind. Starr and Cole almost marry when Cole is nearly sent to prison for drug possession. Starr must tell Todd the truth about Cole going undercover and they end up getting kidnapped by the criminals running the drug ring. Upon her 18th birthday, Starr meets her sister, Danielle as Hannah O'Connor begins causing trouble for Starr. On prom night, Dorian arranges for Cole to be temporarily released from prison to attend the dance with Starr. When Cole refuses to allow Starr to continue seeing him in jail, she is comforted by James Ford. After Starr ends her relationship with Cole, she and James admit their feelings for each other and start dating. The couple makes love for the first time in August 2011. Starr later signs a record deal with Rick Powers and Baz Moreau. Meanwhile, the man everyone believed to be Todd with plastic surgery is revealed to be Todd's twin, Victor. Victor is murdered and Todd is the prime suspect.

On New Year's Starr and Cole are reunited during a prison break. Hannah soon follows and takes Starr hostage at gunpoint. Cole takes a bullet for Starr and James realizes she will always love him, so he ends their relationship. Todd helps Cole fake his death so he can go be with his parents. But once Starr and Hope are in LA, Cole shows up having been sent by Todd to be Starr's "bodyguard".

=== 2012–13 ===
Upon Cole and Hope's deaths in Port Charles, New York, the setting of General Hospital, Starr is rescued by Michael Corinthos. Blair soon arrives to tell Starr that her family is gone. The main suspect in their deaths is Sonny Corinthos, Michael's father. Michael lets Starr stay at his apartment during the trial. When Sonny is acquitted, a distraught Starr takes him hostage at gunpoint; Michael is able to talk her out of it but later has her arrested. However, Todd later blackmails Sonny and Michael into dropping the charges. Johnny Zacchara blackmails Rick Powers into letting Starr out of her contract and she signs another deal with him. Starr and Michael soon begin dating and he disapproves of her new roommate, Trey Mitchell. Starr initially clashes with Michael's sister, and Trey's girlfriend, Kristina Davis. Starr and Michael follow Trey and Kristina to Las Vegas and are shocked to find Kristina and Trey have eloped as a publicity stunt for their reality show. It is later revealed that Kate Howard's alternate personality, Connie, was the shooter the night of Starr's accident. Starr severs all ties with Johnny when it is revealed that he secretly married Connie to keep her from being committed and helped cover up her involvement in the shooting. Todd soon confides in Starr about his involvement in the switching of Téa's stillborn son with Sam Morgan's living child. Starr and Michael nearly have sex for the first time on Halloween when he is confronted by his presumed dead biological father, A. J. Quartermaine. She begins sleeping on Michael's couch when she and Trey get evicted from the apartment. As she offers supports to Michael, Starr blackmails Todd into helping Sam's sister, Molly Lansing get her book published. Starr and Michael have sex for the first time on Christmas Eve. In January 2013, Johnny finally admits that he was behind Hope and Cole's accident. When Johnny is sent to prison, he gives Starr his half of the Haunted Star making her partners with Michael's cousin and sister-in-law, Lulu Spencer-Falconeri.

Starr is seen grieving on the anniversary of Cole and Hope's death, as well as lamenting the day she met Michael and starting a relationship. As they leave the gravesite, an unknown figure walks forward and gazes sadly at Cole and Hope's gravestones. It is heavily suggested that it is Cole and he survived the accident; however, it remains unknown. On March 20, 2013, Starr receives an emergency call from Langston, telling her to return to Los Angeles immediately. She leaves Michael and tells him she will be back soon. A few days later, Starr calls Michael and tells him she is not returning to Port Charles, and breaks up with him without an explanation. It is implied that Hope and Cole turned up alive in Los Angeles and Starr went into hiding with them.

== Reception ==
Alderson received fan mail from fans all over in response to her portrayal of pregnant teenaged Starr, "[…] the most important thing is that we've gotten teenagers and their parents to really talk about the issue and ask the important questions. 'Do you have a plan? What are you going to do? Is this the right time for you?' And they have gotten so much closer to their parents and it warms out hearts to hear that," Alderson revealed in an interview. Amy Kramer also commented on the success of Alderson's online blog about the storyline; "Kristen had hundreds of comments on the blog during the pregnancy — people sharing their own stories about their own relationships with their boyfriends or their parents, or [writing] how they felt about it." Kramer also applauded the series for the strong portrayal of Starr's mother during her pregnancy.

One Life's Executive producer, Frank Valentini was honored by HeartShare Human Services of New York at their annual spring gala for his work in Starr's pregnancy storyline. Valentini, Alderson, Kramer along with ABC's Sue Johnson were invited to participate in a symposium at Hofstra University "[highlighting] the unique role entertainment can play in dealing with social and health issues that affect woman in the country and around the world."

In August 2008, Soap Opera Digest featured an interview on their website with Ashley Wilkens who made a guest appearance as the assistant at Starr's obstetrician's office; Wilkens was also a teenage mom who began working with the campaign to raise awareness. Wilkens could identify with Starr who had made the choice to put her baby up for adoption, despite her family's disapproval. Michael Fairman applauded Alderson for her performance during the storyline and expressed how displeased he would be if she didn't win an Emmy for her portrayal of Starr. Alderson also applauded the storyline saying "[…] it is written so that it never ends. It’s written in a way that has explored everything, and has not been cut short, and nothing has been left out, or any important moments or decisions that characters have to make. It’s an actors dream to be on a show where you can develop the character in its entirety."

In November 2010, Alderson and costar Brandon Buddy were honored by Michael Fairman giving them the "Power Performance of the Week" when Starr and Cole were forced to say goodbye after he is sentenced to 10 years in prison. Alderson and Nic Robuck were also featured on Chelsea Handler's late night talk show, Chelsea Lately, in which Handler poked fun at the list of reason's James gives for not having sex with Starr when she is still grieving from Cole being sent to prison. Alderson earned her first Daytime Emmy Award nomination and win in 2013 for her portrayal of Starr on General Hospital in the category of Outstanding Younger Actress.
