= Hayley Erin =

American actress (born 1994)

- Born: July 13, 1994 (age 32); Los Angeles, California, U.S.
- Occupation: Actress
- Years active: 2004–present
- Spouse: Adam Fergus (m. 2020)
- Children: 2

Hayley Erin (born July 13, 1994) is an American actress. She is known for her roles as Abby Newman (2008–2010) and Claire Newman (2023–present) on the CBS soap opera The Young and the Restless, and as Kiki Jerome in the ABC soap opera General Hospital (2015–2019) for which she won a Daytime Emmy Award. She starred as Taylor Hotchkiss in the Freeform series Pretty Little Liars: The Perfectionists (2019).

== Early life ==
Hayley Erin was born on July 13, 1994, in Los Angeles, California, U.S.

== Career ==
Erin began her career in 2004 when she guest starred on an episode of Malcolm in the Middle. She was also seen on the FOX sketch show MADtv in eight sketches—Celebrity Quarters and a fake movie trailer for It's A Small World as Dakota Fanning. Erin has guest starred on The District, Emily's Reasons Why Not, Two and a Half Men, Modern Family, Austin & Ally and NCIS.

In December 2008, it was announced that Erin had been cast to portray a teenaged version of Abby Newman on The Young and the Restless . Erin made her final appearance on April 14, 2010.

In January 2015, it was announced that she had been hired to portray the role of Kiki Jerome on General Hospital.

In 2019, Erin played Taylor Hotchkiss, one of the main characters in the Freeform series Pretty Little Liars: The Perfectionists. Erin made her feature film debut opposite Sonya Walger in the 2023 horror-thriller film New Life. In September 2023, it was announced Erin would return to The Young and the Restless in the role of Claire Grace.

== Personal life ==
Hayley married Irish actor Adam Fergus in 2020, after announcing their relationship in 2019. They have twin daughters, born August 2021. The family was living in South Dublin in 2021.

== Filmography ==
Television and film roles
Year	Title	Role	Notes
2003–2005	MADtv	Dakota Fanning / Jamie / Nora / Amy	8 episodes
2004	Malcolm in the Middle	Buttercup #1	Episode: "Lois' Sister"
2004	The District	Maggie Lustig	Episode: "Family Values"
2006	Emily's Reasons Why Not	Young Emily	3 episodes
2006	The King of Queens	Charlotte	Episode: "Mama Cast"
2007	Big Love	Jennifer Price	Episode: "Take Me as I Am"
2008–2010	The Young and the Restless	Abby Newman	Recurring role, 67 episodes
2008	Two and a Half Men	Milly	Episode: "Winky-Dink Time"
2009	Big Love	Jennifer	Episode: "Sacrament"
2009, 2020	Modern Family	Brenda Feldman	Episodes: "Pilot", "Legacy"
2010	Telepathetic	Beth	Television film
2010	True Jackson, VP	Sienna	Episode: "True Magic"
2011	Bucket & Skinner's Epic Adventures	Wendy	Episode: "Epic Wingman"
2012	A.N.T. Farm	Duncan	Episode: "ContestANTs"
2012	The Glades	Katie Payne	Episode: "Endless Summer"
2012–2013	Melissa & Joey	Noelle	4 episodes
2014	Austin & Ally	Piper	3 episodes
2014	The Rebels	Heather Massella	Unsold television pilot (Amazon Prime)
2015–2019	General Hospital	Kiki Jerome	Main role
2016	NCIS	Kasey Powers	Episode: "Love Boat"
2019	Pretty Little Liars: The Perfectionists	Taylor Hotchkiss	Main role
2020	L.A.'s Finest	Desiree Roberts	Episode: "Beverly Hills Cops"
2023–present	The Young and the Restless	Claire Newman	Series regular
2023	New Life	Jessica Murdock	Film

== Awards and nominations ==
Year	Award	Category	Work	Result	Ref.
2018	Daytime Emmy Award	Outstanding Younger Actress in a Drama Series	General Hospital	Nominated	
2019	Daytime Emmy Award	Outstanding Younger Actress in a Drama Series	General Hospital	Won	
