= Sean Ringgold =

American actor (born 1977)

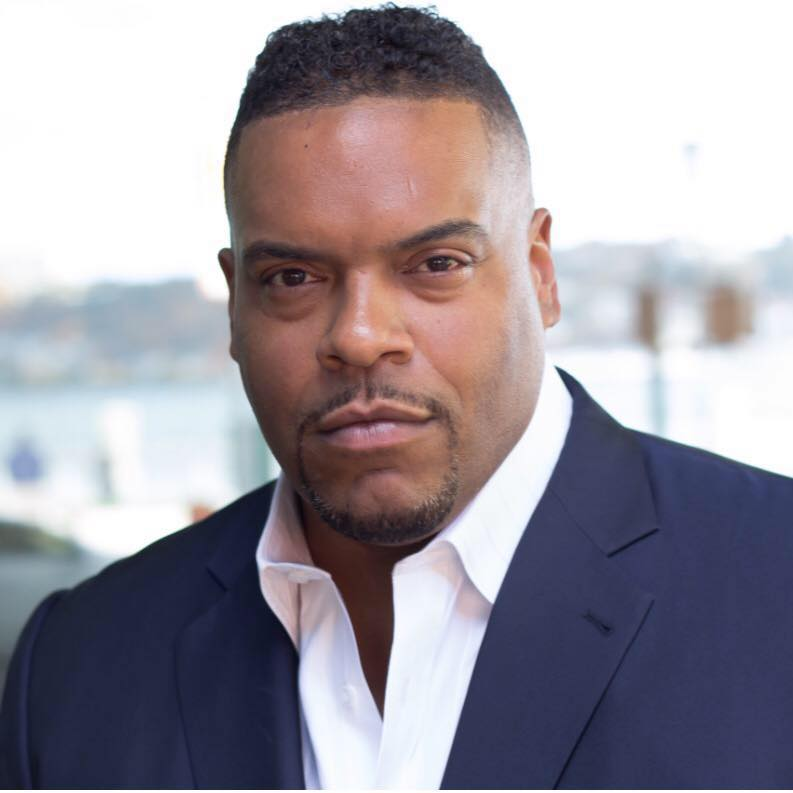
- Ringgold in 2016
- Born: November 3, 1977 (age 49); Rockaway Beach, Queens, New York, U.S.
- Occupation: Actor
- Years active: 1998-present
- Website: seanringgold.com

Sean Ringgold (born November 3, 1977) is an American actor and former bodyguard. He is best known for his role as Shaun Evans on the ABC daytime drama One Life to Live, Junior on The Family Business and portraying Suge Knight in the Notorious B.I.G. biopic Notorious. He also had a cameo in American Gangster and The Smurfs movie. Previously, he has had parts in multiple hit television series such as CW television drama Gossip Girl and Ugly Betty. Ringgold also had featured roles in Orange is the New Black, Billions, the Netflix series, Luke Cage, as the gangster Sugar, and as Correctional Officer Huey Cornell on the ABC drama For Life.

== Early life ==
Sean Ringgold was raised in Rockaway Beach, Queens, New York. For many years he was known as a New York State Arm Wrestling Champion. His fans may remember him as the, "Rockaway Flash." When he wasn't working in the arm wrestling sector, Ringgold worked as a Protection Specialist for BET's 106 and Park. In 2009 after working with many A List celebrities, Ringgold decided to retire from the Body Guard industry and start his acting career. After being cast for the role of Shaun Evans, Ringgold got his break into acting on ABC's One Life To Live. Since then, he has had acting roles in numerous hit TV shows and Series including Netflix's Luke Cage, Billions, Orange Is the New Black, Shades of Blue, Gotham, Gossip Girl, multiple episodes of Law & Order and in multiple episodes of Lady in the Lake (TV series). Ringgold has also been featured in commercials for Budweiser, Burger King, Dr. Scholl's, Dunkin Donuts, Delta Air Lines, Kia, Fiat 500 by Gucci, Pfizer Nexium, Nike, Time Warner Cable and Spike TV.

== Philanthropy ==
Ringgold has lent his time and voice to support and speak on behalf of several causes, including The Men's Health Summit for The Whittier Street Health Center, Get Reel with Your Dreams, The Island of Grenada, and Susan G. Komen for the Cure.
