= Eddie Alderson =

American actor (born 1994)

- Born: October 27, 1994 (age 31); Bucks County, Pennsylvania, U.S.
- Occupation: Actor
- Years active: 2001–present
- Spouse: Sylwia Pracon (m. 2024)
- Relatives: Kristen Alderson (sister)

Eddie Alderson (born October 27, 1994) is an American actor. He is best known for playing the role of Matthew Buchanan on the ABC Daytime soap opera One Life to Live from 2001 to 2012. Alderson's performance garnered two Young Artist Award nominations in 2009 and a Daytime Emmy Award nomination in 2012.

== Early life ==
Alderson was born in Bucks County, Pennsylvania on October 27, 1994. He was raised in Philadelphia, but spent much of his childhood in New York and Los Angeles. His older sister, Kristen Alderson, played Starr Manning on One Life to Live from March 20, 1998 until the show's final episodes aired in January 2012.

== Career ==
Alderson joined the cast of One Life to Live as Matthew Buchanan on May 10, 2001. He was just six years old at the time and he had never acted before. He was put on contract with the series in December 2008. He received a 2012 Daytime Emmy Award nomination for Outstanding Younger Actor for his work on OLTL. He continued to play the role of Matthew until the show's final episodes, which aired in January 2012.

In 2006, he and Melissa Fumero performed a duet of the song "What Can I Do For You?" on One Life: Many Voices for Hurricane Relief, an album of songs by One Life to Live actors to raise funds for victims of Hurricane Katrina.

In 2007, Alderson appeared with Mark Ruffalo in the film Reservation Road. Alderson later played Sanford Clark in the film Changeling (2008). On television, he guest starred as the friend of a murdered boy on Law & Order.

In 2018, Alderson joined the cast of Powder Burns, a Western audio drama produced by his former One Life to Live co-star, David A. Gregory.

== Personal life ==
Alderson was diagnosed with lymphoma cancer in November 2016. On April 26, 2017, it was reported that he had finished his first round of chemotherapy. On July 13, 2017, it was announced that Alderson was back in chemotherapy. In September 2019, Alderson completed chemotherapy and was cancer free.

He began dating Sylwia Pracon in August 2016 and they announced their engagement in May 2022. They were married on September 21, 2024 at Czestochowa Church in Doylestown, Pennsylvania. Many of his former One Life to Live co-stars attended the ceremony.

== Filmography ==
=== Film ===
Year	Title	Role	Notes
2007	Reservation Road	Lucas Arno	Drama film directed by Terry George.; Based on the book of the same title by John Burnham Schwartz.
2008	Changeling	Sanford Clark	Psychological drama film directed, co-produced and scored by Clint Eastwood and written by J. Michael Straczynski.

=== Television ===
Year	Title	Role	Notes
2001–2012	One Life to Live	Matthew Buchanan	Recurring — (2001—08); Contract role — (2008—12)
2009	Law & Order	Todd	Episode: "Pledge"

== Awards and nominations ==
Year	Award	Work	Result	Ref
2009	Young Artist Award for Best Performance in a TV Series - Recurring Young Actor	One Life to Live	Nominated	
2009	Young Artist Award for Outstanding Young Ensemble in a TV Series (shared with Kristen Alderson, Camila Banus, Carmen LoPorto and Austin Williams)	One Life to Live	Nominated	
2012	Daytime Emmy Award for Outstanding Younger Actor in a Drama Series	One Life to Live	Nominated	
