= Roger Howarth =

American actor

- Born: Roger Howarth; Hastings-on-Hudson, New York
- Occupation: Actor
- Years active: 1991–present
- Known for: One Life to Live/General Hospital as Todd Manning; As the World Turns as Paul Ryan; General Hospital as Franco
- Spouse: Cari Stahler (m. 1992)
- Children: 2
- Awards: Daytime Emmy Award Outstanding Younger Lead Actor in a Drama Series 1994, One Life to Live; Daytime Emmy Award Outstanding Supporting Actor in a Drama Series 2026, The Young and the Restless

Roger Howarth is an American actor. He played character Todd Manning on the daytime drama One Life to Live (OLTL); the character earned Howarth a Daytime Emmy Award in 1994, and is cited as an icon in the soap opera genre. He left the series in 2003 and joined soap opera As the World Turns, where he played the character of Paul Ryan until the series' final episode in 2010. Howarth returned to OLTL in May 2011, continuing the role on General Hospital in March 2012. Due to a lawsuit from Prospect Park, Howarth, along with Kristen Alderson and Michael Easton, were forced to exit their roles in March 2013, only to return as new characters in May of the same year. He returned as Franco on General Hospital, the character formerly created and portrayed by James Franco. When the character was written off in March 2021, Howarth returned two months later as a new character, Austin Gatlin-Holt. In addition to his soap opera work, Howarth has guest starred in television shows such as Prey, The Flash and Dawson's Creek.

== Early life and education ==
Roger Howarth was born in Hastings-on-Hudson, New York. His father was involved in theater and wrote plays. Exposed to the arts at an early age, Howarth performed in the play The Grand Duke at the age of seven. He was active in his high school drama department and performed in numerous plays at school.

He played soccer from the time he was a small child up until 19 years of age. He took the opportunity to play in other countries with the Puma Shoes U.S. National Soccer Team. In an interview, when asked if he was a professional soccer player, Howarth answered, "No! Heavens no." He reiterated how he had played soccer as a child up to his late teenage years and said he was on a team that played in Europe, Brazil, and other countries, but that it was an amateur team; he "never got paid" to play, Howarth said.

Howarth initially resisted acting as a profession and studied political science at George Washington University. However, after one semester, he dropped out of college to join an intense acting program at the Eugene O'Neill Theatre Center in Connecticut.

== Career ==
Howarth was discovered during a nationwide talent search and was cast in the role of Kent Winslow on the ABC daytime drama Loving. The role was short-lived. It was shortly after this that he was cast on the ABC daytime drama One Life to Live as rapist Todd Manning in what was supposed to be a day-player role, but became one of the genre's most successful and enduring characters. The character has also been termed an icon by the press. Howarth portrayed Todd on-and-off since 1992. He was strongly praised for his work on the series, and won a Daytime Emmy Award in 1994 for the role. Subsequent attempts to redeem Todd, however, unnerved Howarth. After a female fan shouted "Rape me, Todd!" at a public appearance, his ambivalence about the role deepened. After attempts were made to romantically pair Todd with his victim, Marty Saybrooke, Howarth quit the show in 1995. He subsequently returned, but Todd was portrayed even more as a villain than a hero. His character's pairing with Kassie DePaiva's Blair Cramer won over fans and the two later became a supercouple. While with the series, Howarth found time to extend his career to primetime, and was cast as the murderous Randall Lynch for 4 episodes of the sci-fi series Prey.

In 1998, Howarth departed One Life to Live for a second time, looking to pursue other acting projects both on Broadway and in Hollywood. He made his first Broadway debut in The White Rose, but also did some theater work in Henry IV, Passions, You Touched Me, Mother Courage, and Orestes. A prominent stage appearance for Howarth was in James Goldman's Broadway production of The Lion In Winter. The play officially opened on Broadway on March 11, 1999, and ended with "its final curtain" on May 30, 1999. During the play's run, Howarth appeared opposite Stockard Channing and Laurence Fishburne.

In 2000, Howarth returned to One Life to Live. He portrayed Professor Greg Hetson on the series Dawson's Creek in 2003 during a brief break from the role of Todd. Later that year, he decided it was time for him to move on from the role of Todd, and he signed on with CBS daytime drama As the World Turns, taking over the role of Paul Ryan in July 2003.

In August 2010, it was reported that Howarth would be returning to One Life to Live sometime in January 2011, though other sources disputed this. On April 4, 2011, it was confirmed that Howarth would be returning to the series. Before reclaiming his previous role, it was initially unknown if he would be returning as Todd or someone connecting him to the character. "I am looking forward to returning to One Life to Live," stated Howarth. "We are going to have a lot of fun telling this story, and I am excited to see how it will unfold." Howarth made his onscreen return on May 13, 2011.

Howarth, Michael Easton and Kristen Alderson appeared on General Hospital from 2012 to 2013. Their characters of Todd Manning, John McBain and Starr Manning would return to One Life to Live and likely be recast with new actors with the current actors receiving new characters once they return to General Hospital. Prospect Park owned the rights to all One Life to Live characters; TV Guide reported that because ABC does not want to risk any further legal disputes with Prospect Park concerning the characters, the only way to avoid such disputes may be to have the former One Life to Live actors portray "characters that in no way resemble the current ones" in order to stay on General Hospital. ABC announced that the actors would be returning to General Hospital on May 13, 2013, but without naming the characters they would portray. Howarth also continued to portray Todd Manning on Prospect Park's online version of One Life to Live.

On May 29, 2013, Howarth's new character on General Hospital was revealed; he was cast as Franco, essentially recasting James Franco's original character. Howarth is listed as a full-time contract cast member. On March 9, 2021, the character was written off after being fatally shot by Peter August (Wes Ramsey). That same day, it was announced Howarth had temporarily departed General Hospital, however, would return at a later date. He made his last appearance as Franco Baldwin on March 11, 2021. He returned on May 27 in the role of Dr. Austin Gatlin-Holt. In November 2023, Howarth announced his departure from General Hospital. In August 2025, it was announced Howarth had joined The Young and the Restless'; he made his first appearance as Mitch Bacall on October 31. It was soon revealed that this name was an alias and Howarth is playing Matt Clark.

== Personal life ==
Howarth met actress Cari Stahler in New York City when he lived above the café where she worked. She asked him out on a date, which took place at Coney Island. They later married, and now have two children.

== Filmography ==
Film
Year	Title	Role	Notes
1991	Liebestraum	Boy in Rain	(German for "Dream of love"); Mystery film written and directed by Mike Figgis.
2017	Destruction Los Angeles	Dr. Paul Grant	(English)

Television
Year	Title	Role	Notes
1992	Loving	Kent Winslow	100 episodes
1992	Guiding Light	Jory	September–December 10 episodes
1992–1995, 1996–1998, 2000–2003, 2011–2013	One Life to Live	Todd Manning	Daytime Emmy Award for Outstanding Younger Actor in a Drama Series; Soap Opera Digest Award for Outstanding Younger Lead Actor; Soap Opera Digest Award for Outstanding Villain (1998); Nominated — Daytime Emmy Award for Outstanding Supporting Actor in a Drama Series; Nominated — Daytime Emmy Award for American's Favorite Villain (Special Fan Award); Nominated — Soap Opera Digest Award for Outstanding Villain (1994); Nominated — Soap Opera Digest Award for Outstanding Lead Actor (2001, 2003)
1996	Diagnosis: Murder	Real Bad Radio Host	Episode: "FMurder"
1998	Prey	Randall Lynch	4 episodes
2002–03	Dawson's Creek	Professor Gregory Hetson	9 episodes
2003–10	As the World Turns	Paul Ryan	713 episodes Nominated — Daytime Emmy Award for Outstanding Lead Actor in a Drama Series (2004–05); Nominated — Soap Opera Digest Award for Outstanding Lead Actor
2012–2023	General Hospital	Todd Manning	Series regular; role held from 2012 to 2013
2012–2023	General Hospital	Franco Baldwin	Series regular; role held from 2013 to 2021
2012–2023	General Hospital	Austin Gatlin-Holt	Series regular; role held from 2021 to 2023
2015	The Flash	Mason Bridge	4 episodes
2025–present	The Young and the Restless	Matt Clark	Recurring role

== Awards and nominations ==
List of acting awards and nominations
Year	Award	Category	Title	Result	Ref.
1994	Daytime Emmy Awards	Outstanding Younger Actor in a Drama Series	One Life to Live	Won	
1994	Soap Opera Digest Awards	Outstanding Villain/Villainess	One Life to Live	Nominated	
1995	Daytime Emmy Awards	Outstanding Supporting Actor in a Drama Series	One Life to Live	Nominated	
1995	Soap Opera Digest Awards	Outstanding Younger Lead Actor	One Life to Live	Won	
1998	Soap Opera Digest Awards	Outstanding Villain	One Life to Live	Won	
2001	Soap Opera Digest Awards	Outstanding Lead Actor	One Life to Live	Nominated	
2002	Daytime Emmy Awards	America's Favorite Villain (Special Fan Award)	One Life to Live	Nominated	
2003	Soap Opera Digest Awards	Outstanding Lead Actor	One Life to Live	Nominated	
2004	Daytime Emmy Awards	Outstanding Lead Actor in a Drama Series	As the World Turns	Nominated	
2005	Daytime Emmy Awards	Outstanding Lead Actor in a Drama Series	As the World Turns	Nominated	
2005	Soap Opera Digest Awards	Outstanding Lead Actor	As the World Turns	Nominated	
2026	Daytime Emmy Awards	Outstanding Supporting Actor in a Drama Series	The Young and the Restless	Won	

== See also ==
- Todd Manning and Blair Cramer
- Todd Manning and Téa Delgado

First	Todd Manning (role); 1993–2003; 2011–13	Succeeded by Trevor St. John
Preceded by Trevor St. John	Todd Manning (role); 1993–2003; 2011–13	None
Preceded by Scott Holroyd	Paul Ryan (role); 2003–10	None
Preceded by Rick Hearst	Matt Clark (role); 2025–present	Incumbent
