= Gabrielle Medina =

- One Life to Live character
- Portrayed by: Fiona Hutchison
- Duration: 1987–91; 2001–04; 2012
- First appearance: February 20, 1987
- Last appearance: January 9, 2012
- Created by: Peggy O'Shea
- Introduced by: Paul Rauch (1987); Gary Tomlin (2001); Frank Valentini (2012)
In-universe information
- Occupation: Journalist
- Parents: Dante Medina; Julia Wheaton
- Sisters: Debra Medina
- Husband: Steve Holden (1988); Max Holden (1990–91); Asa Buchanan (2001–02)
- Sons: Al Holden
- Grandmothers: Graciela

Gabrielle Medina is a fictional character from the ABC soap opera One Life to Live. The role was played by actress Fiona Hutchison, who debuted in the role February 20, 1987. She played the role until 1991, and returned from 2001 to 2004. Hutchison briefly reprised the role for the series finale January 6 and 9, 2012. Gabrielle's storylines have included her romances with Max Holden, (James DePaiva/Nicholas Walker), Asa Buchanan (Philip Carey) and Asa's son Bo Buchanan (Robert S. Woods), a feud with Tina Lord (Andrea Evans), the introduction of her mother, being trapped in the lost city of Eterna and being murdered by the Music Box Killer.

== Casting ==
The role was played by actress Fiona Hutchison, who debuted in the role February 20, 1987. Medina had previously appeared in soap operas Guiding Light and As the World Turns. In March 1991, it was reported that Hutchinson would be departing One Life to Live' at the end of that month as she and the soap had been unable to come to contract terms. Hutchison refused to accept a five per cent pay increase from ABC during her contract renegotiations. She felt that she was treated "shabbily".

Hutchinson returned to One Life to Live as Gabrielle in 2001. In October 2003, it was reported that Hutchinson would leaving the soap again. Her departure aired in 2004, when the character was killed off by the Music Box Killer. In October 2011, Hutchinson announced on social media that she would be returning to the role, with her filming dates on October 25 and November 15 of that year, although she did not know in which circumstances the character would be returning in. The following month, in response to viewers asking her questions about her return, Hutchinson wrote on Facebook, "I simply cannot give away any spoilers for my upcoming appearances on "One Life to Live" but I can say that it has been a beautiful experience for me thus far! Being around my "OLTL" family, the cast, the crew, the producers, the directors, the writers, the staff, it has really touched me. I am having moments of... sheer happiness, sadness, nostalgia, creativity... all of it. This place, these people are all a part of me as are all of you whom I cherish so very much". Hutchinson's return coincided with the soap's finale. Her return aired on January 6, 2012, when she appeared as an angel along with Susan Batten and Jessica Tuck as Luna Moody and Megan Gordon, respectively.

== Development ==
Gabrielle was introduced into the series via a storyline set in Argentina. Hutchinson and several other cast members filmed in the country for the storyline. The story explores other characters attempting to begin a new life there where they become embroiled in a cocaine supply operation run by the kingpin Medina. It was the first time a US soap opera had filmed in Argentina. Other scenes Hutchinson filmed in the country included scenes of Gabrielle in a mountain hideaway. Writers created a storyline in which Gabrielle has a child with Max Holden (James DePaiva) and the baby is taken from her. Then Gabrielle marries Max's brother, Steve Holden (Russ Anderson) and Hutchinson believed it is a "slightly misguided" choice on Gabrielle's behalf.

In one of her early storylines, Gabrielle has a feud with her foe, Tina Lord (Andrea Evans); in real life, Hutchinson and Evans were close friends, with Evans being a bridesmaid at Hutchinson's wedding and throwing her a bridal shower consisting of One Life to Live cast and crew members. The character's mother Julia Medina (Linda Thorson) and sister Debra Medina (Lucinda Fisher) were introduced in August 1989. A writer for Soap Opera Digest said the storyline would show that the relationship between Gabrielle and her mother is "strained, to say the least." During her time on the soap, Gabrielle has romances with both Asa Buchanan (Philip Carey) and his son Bo Buchanan (Robert S. Woods); Gabrielle was one of several characters that the father and son both had romances with. When Gabrielle is murdered, her body is found by Bo. In 1989, Gabrielle was part of a storyline which saw her and several other characters trapped in the lost city of Eterna. The storyline also sees Gabrielle and Tina falling in a hole during their time in Eterna.

Hutchinson noted that she felt "truly blessed" to play both Gabrielle on One Life to Live and Jenna Bradshaw on Guiding Light; when asked to choose between them, Hutchinson said, "I cannot choose between them. In fact, I will not. Both Jenna and Gabrielle were two richly woven characters with so many exquisite layers that I must say, as an actress... Characters like Jenna and Gabrielle come along in those rare, unexpected instances when the writer uses the canvas as a magnificent kaleidoscopic tool, with which every emotion one could possibly imagine surfaces and then subsides, only to be enriched by the raw sensuality of the storyline. It would be like asking William Shakespeare if he preferred Ophelia to Lady Macbeth". Hutchison told Nancy M. Reichardt of The Gainesville Sun that she liked Gabrielle's personality, saying "What I loved about Gabrielle was that she was up, she was down, she was all over the place." However, she disliked that many crying scenes she had to do and it became "drudgery" for her.

Gabrielle also has a long-running romance with Max, played by DePaiva; who explained in 1998 that when he would do love scenes with Hutchinson, they would "clear the set of all nonessential people" beforehand. In one storyline, Max ends up getting shot after trying to protect Gabrielle from the Wymans, who are running a baby-selling operation. The role of Max was also portrayed by Nicholas Walker during Hutchinson's first stint on the soap; the producers felt that a lookalike of Max would not be able to be developed into a new storyline for Gabrielle. The recast was explained by having Max change appearance through plastic surgery and pretend to be "Matt" in 1990; Gabrielle ends up having a romance with Matt, unaware that he is really Max. Hutchinson found it humorous when she met Walker's twin brother when he came on set and said she could not take him seriously as she remembered the love scenes she had done with Walker. Gabrielle and Max marry in July 1990 after Max' near death from a crash. However, Max is torn between his business and his love for Gabrielle. In August 1990, it was reported that Gabrielle, who had returned to her "evil ways", would make an "ill-fated decision" and that her scheming would cause "disaster" to Max' business, the tabloid paper "The National Intruder".

After announcing her departure from One Life to Live in early 1991, Hutchison admitted that she had regrets that her character would not get together with Asa (Carey). She reckoned they would have been "a dynamite duo". She also thought that she had been "extremely lucky" to get the leading men she had on the show, whose actors had become good friends, including John Loprieno (Cord Roberts) "with whom Gabrielle had a brief but memorable fling." The character's departure storyline saw her sent to jail, after taking the fall for Carlo Hesser's (Thom Christopher) treachery. Of Gabrielle's exit, Hutchison stated: "I do think they will give her the intense therapy she needs to straighten out. The writers really did a great job in writing her out of the show. They didn't have too much time to turn the story around because we were negotiating in good faith right to the last minute and nobody knew whether I would stay on with the show or leave." Hutchison called her four years on the show "the most pleasurable of my career", and she said she was looking forward to new job opportunities.

Hutchison later admitted that she left because she was "burned out". She said playing the character put her in therapy because filming was "an emotional roller coaster". She said: "I put myself into it whole-heartedly, and it took so much out of me." Hutchison was asked to return to the serial several times, which she turned down. She agreed to reprise the role in 2001 after talking with executive producer Gary Tomlin, who had already sought permission from the network for Gabrielle's return storyline, and whose knowledge of the character reassured her. She felt that he was "more prepared than anyone I had ever discussed this with." Hutchison also lived eight blocks from the studio, which allowed her to see her sons during breaks. She believed that she could play the character again without it taking a toll on her mental health. However, she thought Gabrielle's comeback storyline would lead her to "head back down those dark roads again" because she was involved with Max Holden (James DePaiva).

== Storylines ==
Gabrielle first appears when former boyfriend Max Holden (James DePaiva) visits her native Argentina with his new girlfriend, Tina Lord (Andrea Evans), in 1987. Gabrielle's drug lord father, Dante Medina (Henry Darrow), is killed and Tina is presumed dead after plummeting over the Iguazu Falls. She turns up alive as Gabrielle secretly gives birth to Max's son; Gabrielle is soon duped by Tina into letting Tina pass the child off as her own. Gabrielle believes that Tina is raising the child with Max, but Tina actually pretends the child is hers with estranged husband Cord Roberts (John Loprieno), hoping to reconcile with him. Gabrielle moves to Llanview in July 1987, and the truth is eventually revealed, leading her to reunite with her son, Al. Max and Gabrielle fight their passionate attraction to one another after she marries his brother, Steve, in 1988.

After Gabrielle and Steve divorce, she orchestrates a baby switch involving Steve's baby with fiancée Brenda McGillis (Brenda Brock) to prevent her friend Michael Grande (Dennis Parlato) from learning that his newborn son actually died; Gabrielle and Michael get engaged, but once the switch is exposed, the relationship ends. Gabrielle goes on trial but is given a slap on the wrist; she and Max reunite and marry in 1990. In 1991, mob boss Carlo Hesser (Thom Christopher) blackmails Gabrielle to aid him in his plot to poison newspaper publisher Viki Lord Buchanan (Erika Slezak). Gabrielle eventually backs out and testifies against Carlo in trial for Viki's attempted murder. She ends up accepting the blame and goes to jail for seven years to protect Al from Carlo's wrath in 1991.

After her stint in Statesville Prison, Gabrielle returns to Llanview in 2001 and marries billionaire Asa Buchanan (Philip Carey) as part of her scheme to destroy Max, with whom she is angry for being a bad father to Al. Gabrielle and Asa plot to fake Asa's death and frame Max for the "murder," but Gabrielle falls in love with Max again. Asa catches wind of this and, suspecting Gabrielle and Max are plotting to kill him for real, decides to fake his own death without her help and frame both Gabrielle and Max for his "death." The truth is uncovered when Asa's son, Bo Buchanan (Robert S. Woods), finds him hiding out on St. Blaze's Island.

Upon his return to Llanview, Asa divorces Gabrielle, throwing her out of the mansion and leaving her with no clothes, no money, and no home. Angry with his father, Bo invites Gabrielle to live with him in his garret but demands that she find herself a job. Gabrielle overhears information with which she can blackmail Todd Manning (Roger Howarth) to give her a job as Style Editor of his newspaper, The Sun. Bo suspects foul play and demands the truth from Gabrielle. When she finally admits to her crimes, she expects that Bo will throw her out of his home, but he surprises her by asking her to stay. Gabrielle and Bo grow very close while living together, and they eventually fall in love and begin dating seriously, which allows her to become a less vindictive person. When Bo's ex-wife, Nora Hanen (Hillary B. Smith), becomes the Assistant District Attorney, Gabrielle becomes jealous and insecure with her relationship with Bo, but he assures her that he and Nora are over. When Gabrielle learns that Matthew is really Bo's son, she keeps the truth from them both but eventually confesses to Bo. Nora is furious, but Bo forgives Gabrielle and assures her he still wants Gabrielle in his life.

After Gabrielle and Bo have a fight one night, she gets drunk and is taken advantage of by Troy MacIver (Ty Treadway). Despite her insistence that it was a mistake, Troy pursues Gabrielle to the point of near stalking her. Their clandestine meetings are caught on video by Jennifer Rappaport (Jessica Morris), and the footage soon becomes evidence in a possible homicide. Gabrielle destroys the evidence in a panic but promises to make up for it by going undercover to expose Troy's crimes. The plan goes wrong and Troy kidnaps Gabrielle and locks her in a morgue to die, but Bo rescues her. Gabrielle's son, Al, soon becomes sick and in need of a liver transplant. Gabrielle offers to give part of her liver to save his life, but Al dies when the procedure fails. Grief-stricken, Gabrielle breaks off her engagement to Bo and moves out of the apartment. Bo convinces her not to give up on life, and the two resume their engagement after she moves back in. On New Year's Eve of 2003, Gabrielle is murdered by serial killer Stephen Haver (Matthew Ashford).

When Bo is shot by Troy at the series finale in 2012, Gabrielle appears to Bo from Heaven, encouraging him to stay with her in the afterlife and resume their romance.

== Reception ==
In 1989, David Eskola from The Greenville News believed that Hutchinson revelled in her role as the "selfish, devious Gabrielle". That same year, Lilana Novakovich from the Toronto Star called Gabrielle "nasty" and wrote that viewers love to hate her. That same year, Connie Passalacqua from The Herald also called the character "nasty" and credited Hutchinson as being part of the reason that the soap had "the best casting in daytime among its young female leads", alongside Jensen Buchanan (Sarah Gordon) and Jessica Tuck (Megan Gordon). Nancy M. Reichardt from the Orlando Sentinel called Gabrielle "man-hungry" in reference to her affair with married man Michael Grande (Dennis Parlato). In 1990, Shirley Wilson from Detroit Free Press opined that Gabrielle and Max were having "one of the most passionate romances of the summer", and called Gabrielle "beautiful but wicked". Wilson added that Gabrielle was "consumed by her lust for money" and would "stop at nothing to get it".

A writer for Soap Opera Digest named the character "OLTL's manipulative minx", and reckoned she "may get her claws trimmed back a little" when her mother and sister make a sudden arrival. The Gainesville Sun's Nancy M. Reichardt called the character a "vixen" and stated that Hutchison "spent much of her time crying" while playing the role. She also opined that Hutchison departed the show in "a hail of controversy" after refusing the network's offer of a small pay increase. Tina Clarke from The Province opined that Gabrielle was selfish. While Candace Havens of The Free Lance-Star branded her "sultry" and "conniving". In 2003, Seli Groves from The Post-Standard opined that it was ironic that the soap was planning to kill off Gabrielle whilst also planning to revive her seemingly dead son, Al. Jamey Giddens from Daytime Confidential opined that Gabrielle was one of Hutchinson's "unforgettable characters" and "vixens-turned-romantic heroines" she portrayed, and noted that Gabrielle's death caused "fan outrage".
