= List of One Life to Live characters introduced in the 1980s =

This is a list of characters from the ABC Daytime soap opera One Life to Live that began theirs and run between the beginning of 1980 and the end of 1989.

== Austin Buchanan ==
Austin Buchanan
- One Life to Live character
- Portrayed by: David Gautreaux
- Duration: 1989–1990
- First appearance: March 10, 1989
- Last appearance: April 3, 1990
- Created by: S. Michael Schnessel
- Introduced by: Paul Rauch
In-universe information
- Family: Buchanan
- Parents: Pike Buchanan; Jeanette Buchanan
- Aunts and uncles: Asa Buchanan; Jeannie Buchanan Garretson
- First cousins: Clint Buchanan; Bo Buchanan; Ben Davidson; Rafe Garretson

Austin Buchanan is a fictional character on the ABC Daytime soap opera One Life to Live. The fraternal nephew of Asa Buchanan, the role was played by actor David Gautreaux from March 1989 until the character's onscreen death in August of that year. Gautreaux briefly reappeared in March 1990.

== Drew Buchanan ==
Drew Buchanan
- One Life to Live character
- Portrayed by: Keith Bogart (1988–89); Victor Browne (1996–97); Sam Ball (1998); (and child actors)
- Duration: 1983–85; 1988–89; 1996–98
- First appearance: September 23, 1983
- Last appearance: September 16, 1998
- Created by: John William Corrington; Joyce Hooper Corrington
- Introduced by: Jean Arley
In-universe information
- Occupation: Officer for the Llanview Police Department
- Family: Buchanan
- Parents: Bo Buchanan; Becky Lee Hunt
- Half-brothers: David Vickers Buchanan; Matthew Buchanan
- Half-sisters: Rachel Gannon (step)
- Grandparents: Asa Buchanan; Olympia Buchanan
- Aunts and uncles: Clint Buchanan; Ben Davidson
- Nieces and nephews: Drew Buchanan II; David's unnamed child
- First cousins: Cord Roberts; Kevin Buchanan (adoptive); Joey Buchanan; (adoptive); Rex Balsom; Jessica Buchanan; Natalie Buchanan

Drew Buchanan is a fictional character on the ABC Daytime soap opera One Life to Live. The son of Bo Buchanan and Becky Lee Abbott, he was conceived during a one-night stand between the two when Bo cheated on his then-fiancée Delilah Ralston. Upon the realization of her pregnancy with Drew, Becky Lee accepts the marriage proposal of Delilah's brother, Drew Ralston, to legitimize the pregnancy. The morning of Becky and Drew's wedding, Drew Ralston is killed. Asa Buchanan, assuming the child to be the illegitimate child of his son Bo, offered to marry Becky Lee to give the child the surname "Buchanan". The child is born to Becky Lee Buchanan on the episode first run on September 23, 1983, and Becky Lee later leaves Llanview with new husband Jesse Wilde and infant Drew Buchanan in tow in 1985. A SORAS, teenaged Drew returns to Llanview in 1988 for the funeral of Bo's then-wife and his stepmother, Didi O'Neill, leaving shortly thereafter in 1989. Drew returns as the bitter estranged son of Bo in 1996, influenced by his mother's torrid feelings toward the Buchanan family. A charming and troubled young man, he engages in romantic liaisons with some women in Llanview before leaving again in 1997. In 1998, a reformed Drew, freshly graduated from the police academy, returns to Llanview to repair his broken relationship with his father, and is hired by Bo as an officer for the Llanview Police Department. Months later, he is shot and killed in the line of duty by Barbara Graham while trying to stop her from shooting Kevin Buchanan.

== Olympia Buchanan ==
Olympia Buchanan
- One Life to Live character
- Portrayed by: Taina Elg (1980–82); Catherine Hickland (2008)
- Duration: 1980–82, 2008
- First appearance: August 1980
- Last appearance: July 2008
- Created by: Sam Hall; Peggy O'Shea
- Introduced by: Joseph Stuart
In-universe information
- Other names: Olympia Bonard (maiden name); Nicole Bonard
- Occupation: Housewife
- Siblings: Nicole Bonard
- Husband: Asa Buchanan (until 1982)
- Children: Clint Buchanan; Bo Buchanan
- Stepchildren: Ben Davidson
- Grandchildren: Cord Roberts; David Vickers Buchanan; Kevin Buchanan (adoptive); Joey Buchanan (adoptive); Rex Balsom; Jessica Buchanan; Natalie Buchanan; Drew Buchanan; Matthew Buchanan

Olympia Buchanan (maiden name Bonard) is a fictional character on the ABC Daytime soap opera One Life to Live. The first wife of Asa Buchanan and mother of Bo and Clint, the role was played by Taina Elg from August 1980 through Olympia's onscreen death in early January 1982. She was first seen in Paris as "Nichole Bernard" when Pat Ashley and Bo Buchanan were there on vacation, but ended up the prisoner of ex-husband Asa in the creepy mansion "Moorecliffe" where Asa's nephew Rafe Garretson took care of her. Olympia managed to escape several times, interrupting Asa and Samantha Vernon's wedding celebration. It was at this masked ball that she shot Asa and in a struggle with Samantha fell over a balcony mortally wounding herself. On her deathbed, she revealed to Bo that his real father was Yancy Ralston, although this was later to be proven a lie. It was later revealed that Olympia truly loved Asa and her sons Clint and Bo but that Asa's unfaithfulness and corrupt ways had driven her to madness.

== Cassie Callison ==
Cassie Callison
- One Life to Live character
- Portrayed by: Cusi Cram (1981–1983); Ava Haddad (1983–1986, 1990); Holly Gagnier (1986–1988); Laura Koffman (1991–2010)
- Duration: 1981–1988; 1990–1999; 2001–2004; 2010
- First appearance: August 1981
- Last appearance: March 1, 2010
- Created by: Sam Hall; Peggy O'Shea
- Introduced by: Joseph Stuart; Paul Rauch (1990); Gary Tomlin (2001); Frank Valentini (2010)
In-universe information
- Occupation: Former Reporter for The Banner
- Family: Cramer
- Parents: David Reynolds; Dorian Cramer
- Adoptive parents: Herb Callison
- Siblings: Adriana Cramer; Langston Wilde (adoptive)
- Spouse: Rob Coronal (1985–86); Bo Buchanan (1991); Andrew Carpenter (1993–97); Kevin Buchanan (1998–99)
- Children: William Sloan Carpenter (stillborn)
- Adoptive children: River Carpenter
- Grandparents: Sam Reynolds; Ms. Howard; Lou Cramer; Sonya Cramer
- Aunts: Addie Cramer; Melinda Cramer
- First cousins: Blair Cramer; Kelly Cramer; Paul Cramer

Cassie Callison (formerly Coronal, Buchanan, and Carpenter) is a fictional character on the American ABC daytime drama One Life to Live. She is the daughter of Dr. Dorian Cramer Lord and musician David "David Renaldi" Reynolds, and adopted by former stepfather and attorney Herb Callison. The role was portrayed for the longest duration by actress Laura Koffman.

=== Storylines ===
In 1981, a young girl named Cassie Reynolds appeared and soon revealed herself as Dorian's daughter. Dorian had been in medical school when she had given birth to Cassie, whose father David Renaldi had run off with her. The mother and daughter reunited, and Dorian's husband Herb Callison adopted Cassie. In 1985, Cassie became engaged to Rob Coronal, but by 1986 their marriage had ended in divorce. Dorian left Llanview in 1987 (and became the U.S. Ambassador to Mendorra) after discovering that Cassie was having an affair with Dorian's boyfriend, private detective Jon Russell. Cassie and Jon's relationship later fizzled as she reunited with ex-husband Rob.

Cassie lives with a returned Melinda in Dorian's penthouse, but leaves town in 1988. Dorian returns in 1989, followed by Cassie in 1991.

Much to Dorian's chagrin, Cassie becomes involved with Bo Buchanan; Dorian's machinations (and a failed attempt to kill Cassie by Bo's insane ex, Alex Olanov) do not stop the couple from marrying. Immediately after the wedding, however, Bo's presumed-dead wife Sarah Gordon appears, very much alive. An anguished Bo chooses to stay with Cassie, but their marriage later falls apart after Cassie realizes Bo is still in love with Sarah.

In 1993, Cassie marries the Reverend Andrew Carpenter; she later miscarries their son, William. She finds an abandoned baby in the manger outside St. James Church. Beth, the mother of Cassie's foundling, appears but soon dies; her last wish is for Cassie and Andrew to adopt baby River.

After baby William's death, Cassie and Andrew's marriage was never quite the same. Prior to their adopting River, Cassie suffered a mental breakdown, and Andrew nearly fell into an affair with close friend Marty Saybrooke. The Carpenters' marriage seemed to be getting back on even footing as they focused on raising their new son River, but when Cassie went back to work as a journalist at The Banner in 1997, she began a tempestuous working relationship with rival reporter Kevin Buchanan, one that slowly blossomed into mutual passion. Cassie broke her wedding vows and began an affair with Kevin, ruining her marriage and her reputation, even losing custody of River in the ensuing divorce and custody battle. Kevin and Cassie were deeply in love, however, and Kevin risked his life to save Cassie from the inferno that burnt down the Cramer homestead in Canton, Ohio. Meanwhile, Cassie's long-lost father, David Renaldi, returned to Llanview, stricken with ALS, to reconnect with his daughter and new grandson.

Wounded in the fire in Canton, Kevin became enamoured of his hospital nurse, Barbara Graham, who developed an obsessive fixation on Kevin after their brief affair went sour. Turning murderous, Barbara attempted to kill Cassie, who she believed stood in the way of her future with Kevin. On September 15, 1998, Barbara lured Cassie to the docks in the warehouse district of Llanview and attempted to gun her down; instead, she murdered Drew Buchanan and gravely injured Cassie, leaving her paralyzed and using a wheelchair. Eventually, Cassie discovered that Barbara was the shooter, and her rage and fury left her mind once again unhinged. Cassie turned the tables on Barbara, blackmailing her with knowledge of her crime, forcing Barbara to participate in her wedding to Kevin and become Cassie's personal nurse. As Cassie slowly regained the use of her legs, she hid the truth from her friends and family. Finally, Cassie dragged Barbara to a bell tower at gunpoint, attempting to force her to jump to her death. Kevin and Andrew arrived just in time to stop Cassie. Cassie was institutionalized, and Barbara was arrested.

When Kevin and the family visited Cassie, they discovered she had suffered a full psychotic break, believing she was still happily married to Andrew. Andrew and Kevin both attempted to break through to her, to little avail. Cassie's mother, Dorian, had never approved of Cassie and Kevin's relationship, and in early 1999 decided to send Cassie to Switzerland for further treatment. Kevin fought her every step of the way, even stowing away on the private plane bound for Switzerland to try one last time to get through to his wife. In a brief moment of lucidity, Cassie begged Kevin to let her go. Heartbroken, Kevin returned to Llanview and agreed to have his marriage annulled. Cassie had makes a series of recurring appearances. In the years since Cassie's departure to Switzerland, it was revealed that she was slowly recovering, and eventually River was even sent out of the country to spend time with his mother. Cassie herself finally reappeared in December 2001, as a guest at Todd and Blair's wedding. Cassie explained that she was almost fully recovered and living in Switzerland, and shared a somewhat awkward reunion with her cousin Kelly, who had since gone on to marry Kevin herself.

Fully recovered, Cassie next returned a year later in November 2002, rushing to Blair's aid after she was apparently attacked by mob hitmen. Cassie believed Blair had been rendered catatonic, and was tasked to take her out of the country. In reality, Todd and Blair had used Cassie to lure away her supposed assailants with the help of a body double, while Blair hid out at Todd's penthouse.

While back in town for Blair, Cassie also recounted her harrowing experiences with Mitch Laurence for Viki and Bo. Nothing could have prepared her for the shock of her life when she returned the following March to see Dorian, only to discover that her mother was marrying the resurrected Mitch - the man who had tried to rape Cassie. Cassie and Blair watched in shock and disgust as Dorian and Mitch took their unholy vows, and gained control of the Lord fortune. Cassie did not yet realize that Dorian was conning Mitch in the hopes of winning his trust and destroying him. Dorian haltingly tried to explain things to her daughter, but Cassie left town in disgust for her new home in Savannah. Later that year, on Mother's Day, Cassie and Dorian made peace after Cassie discovered Dorian and Blair's efforts to murder Mitch. Meanwhile, a now teenaged River came home from Savannah to spend time with his father and grandmother. During this visit, Cassie also painfully reunited with Kevin and Kelly.

In the fall of 2003, Cassie was part of the Cramers' competition to win "Aunt Betsy's" inheritance, but was immediately disqualified due to her own "lapses in judgment" with Andrew and Kevin. In 2004, Cassie returned, furious about River's relationship with Adriana Colon, his newfound "aunt". She and Adriana eventually made peace, and Cassie returned to Savannah, where she resides to this day. Dorian calls Cassie to warn her about a returned Mitch on February 15, 2010. She then returns to Llanview with her ex-husband, Andrew, in tow and reveals that Melinda has died. Following a short reunion with her mother, sisters and, cousins Cassie returns to Savannah. When Bo and Nora remarry, it is revealed that Andrew travelled back with her, to visit River.

== Laurel Chapin ==
Laurel Chapin Wolek
- One Life to Live character
- Portrayed by: Janice Lynde
- Duration: 1984–85
- First appearance: January 1984
- Last appearance: December 1985
- Created by: Sam Hall; Peggy O'Shea
- Introduced by: Jean Arley
In-universe information
- Other names: Laurel Chapin (maiden name)
- Spouse: Larry Wolek (1985)
- Children: Rob Coronal

Laurel Chapin Wolek is a fictional character on the ABC Daytime soap opera One Life to Live. Actress Janice Lynde appeared in the role from November 1983 until the character's death in November 1985. She came on as the mistress of mobster Alex Coronal and mother of his son, Rob. Laurel fell in love with Dr. Larry Wolek whom she eventually married. During that time, their happiness was threatened by a psychopath named Tracy James and Larry's old enemy, Dr. Ivan Kipling. It appears that Dr. Kipling is stalking and out to hurt Laurel for voting against him. One day, fearing the worst, Laurel drives off the road, resulting in her death. Later, it is revealed that Tracy had cut her brakes.

== Ted Clayton ==
Ted Clayton
- One Life to Live character
- Portrayed by: Keith Charles (1980–81); Mark Goddard (1981)
- Duration: 1980–81
- First appearance: May 1980
- Last appearance: November 1981
- Created by: Sam Hall; Peggy O'Shea
- Introduced by: Joseph Stuart
In-universe information
- Other names: Tom Clarkson
- Occupation: Con man
- Spouse: Irene Manning (1960s–1981?) (Note: At the time of Irene's first appearance in 1978, she dies on-screen, leaving Ted apparently widowed. With the series retconning of the character in 2011, the legal end of the marriage could be either when Irene "dies" for the first time in 1978 or when Ted dies on-screen in 1981.)
- Stepchildren: Tina Lord

Ted Clayton is a fictional character on the ABC Daytime soap opera One Life to Live. The role was originated on the series by actor Keith Charles in May 1980, a role he played through 1981. The role was assumed in 1981 by Mark Goddard, playing Ted until he is killed onscreen by police Lt. Ed Hall (Al Freeman, Jr.) in November 1981.

== Wade Coleman ==
Wade Coleman
- One Life to Live character
- Portrayed by: Doug Wert
- Duration: 1987–89
- First appearance: June 1987
- Last appearance: June 22, 1989
- Created by: Peggy O'Shea
- Introduced by: Paul Rauch
In-universe information
- Spouse: Mari Lynn Dennison (1988—)

Wade Coleman is a fictional character on the ABC Daytime serial One Life to Live. The role was played by actor Doug Wert debuted June 1987, appearing continually until June 22, 1989. Wade was a troubled young man who reformed with the help of Mari Lynn Dennison. He was the son of Roberta Coleman, a former cellmate of Dorian's.

== Rob Coronal ==
Rob Coronal
- One Life to Live character
- Portrayed by: Ted Marcoux (1984–86); Mark Arnold (1987–89)
- Duration: 1984–89
- First appearance: August 1984
- Last appearance: April 4, 1989
- Created by: Peggy O'Shea
- Introduced by: Paul Rauch
In-universe information
- Parents: Alex Crown
- Spouse: Cassie Callison (1985–86); Joanna Leighton (1986–8?)
- Grandparents: Leo Coronal
- First cousins: Marco Dane; Mario Corelli; Garibaldi Corelli

Rob Coronal is a fictional character on the ABC Daytime soap opera One Life to Live. The role was originated from August 1984 until 1986 by Ted Marcoux. Actor Mark Arnold assumed the role in August 1987, playing Mark through the character's last appearance in 1989. Rob was the illegitimate son of Laurel Chapin and Alex Coronal and eventually married Cassie Cramer. After their divorce, they would briefly date again, but he also would become involved with her aunt, Melinda Cramer.

== Mari Lynn Dennison ==
Mari Lynn Dennison
- One Life to Live character
- Portrayed by: Tammy Amerson
- Duration: 1986–89
- First appearance: August 15, 1986
- Last appearance: December 7, 1989
- Created by: Peggy O'Shea
- Introduced by: Paul Rauch
In-universe information
- Occupation: Actress
- Family: Riley
- Parents: Tom Dennison; Carol Harper
- Spouse: Wade Coleman (1988–present)
- Aunts and uncles: Joe Riley; Eileen Riley
- First cousins: Tim Siegel; Julie Siegel; Megan Craig Riley; Kevin Riley Buchanan; Joey Riley Buchanan

Mari Lynn Dennison Coleman is a fictional character on the ABC Daytime soap opera One Life to Live. The role was played by actress Tammy Amerson from August 15, 1986, through December 7, 1989.

=== Character history ===
Arriving in fictional Llanview in August 1986, Mari Lynn is soon seduced into becoming a disciple of cult leader Mitch Laurence. Ultimately, she breaks free of the cult and marries Wade Coleman onscreen June 9, 1988. She later becomes a star of the fictional soap opera (within a soap opera) Fraternity Row alongside Megan Gordon, leaving town in July 1989.

== Tom Dennison ==
Tom Dennison
- One Life to Live character
- Portrayed by: Lee Patterson
- Duration: 1986–88
- First appearance: August 15, 1986
- Last appearance: July 25, 1988
- Created by: Peggy O'Shea
- Introduced by: Paul Rauch
In-universe information
- Occupation: Businessman
- Family: Riley
- Adoptive parents: Mr. and Mrs. Dennison
- Siblings: Eileen Riley; Joe Riley
- Spouse: Carol Harper (pre-1986–88?) (Note: The character appears alive in 2008 after her supposed on-screen death in 1988, dying again in 2009.)
- Children: Mari Lynn Dennison
- Nieces and nephews: Tim Siegel; Julie Siegel; Megan Craig Riley; Kevin Riley Buchanan; Joey Riley Buchanan

Actor Lee Patterson returned to the ABC Daytime serial One Life to Live and fictional Llanview in the role of widower Thomas "Tom" Dennison with his daughter Mari Lynn in August 1986. Everyone in town — especially Victoria "Viki" Lord Buchanan (Erika Slezak) — are shocked at his near-exact resemblance to the late Joe Riley (Patterson), Viki's first on-screen husband and father to her first two children. It is ultimately revealed that Tom is Joe's long-lost twin put up for adoption at birth. Tom and Viki engage in a brief affair before he leaves town in 1988.

Lee Halpern, a former prostitute for Renée Divine (Patricia Elliott) and now a business partner of Max Holden (James DePaiva), arrives in Llanview in 1987 and turns out to be Carol Harper Dennison, Tom's presumed-dead wife. Her awkward reunion with her daughter is cut short when Lee is accidentally shot to death by Mari Lynn in 1988.

== Renée Divine Buchanan ==
Renée Divine Buchanan
- One Life to Live character
- Portrayed by: Phyllis Newman (1987–88); Patricia Elliott (1988–2011); Loyita Chapel (2008)
- Duration: 1987–2011
- First appearance: August 1987
- Last appearance: August 24, 2011
- Created by: S. Michael Schnessel
- Introduced by: Paul Rauch
In-universe information
- Other names: Jean Rappaport
- Occupation: Owner of The Palace Hotel; Former Madam
- Spouse: Asa Buchanan (1988–92, 1999–2001, 2004–07)
- Children: Ben Davidson
- Stepchildren: Clint Buchanan; Bo Buchanan
- Grandchildren: Matthew Buchanan (step); David Vickers Buchanan (step); Jessica Buchanan (step); Natalie Buchanan (step); Joey Buchanan (step); Kevin Buchanan (step); Cord Roberts (step); Rex Balsom (step)

Renée Divine Buchanan is a fictional character from the ABC Daytime soap opera One Life to Live. The role was portrayed by Phyllis Newman from August 1987 to 1988 and Patricia Elliott from February 26, 1988 through 2011. Elliott was taken off contract in October 2003 and her screen time became increasingly infrequent.

Renée arrives in Llanview in 1987 as the former employer of Lee Halpern, secretly once a prostitute at Renée's Strip Club in Georgia. She soon runs into Asa Buchanan, her old flame; they rekindle their romance and marry on November 30, 1988, in a double wedding with Asa's grandson Cord Roberts, who remarries ex-wife Tina Lord.

Mobster Carlo Hesser—another of Renée's exes—appears in Chesnut Hills in 1990. Asa and Renée divorce in 1992 when Asa discovers old love letters that Carlo had sent Renée, but Asa and Renée eventually wed again on May 18, 1999. It is revealed that Renée had conceived a son by Asa when they had been involved in their youth, and had put the boy up for adoption. Max Holden poses as the missing heir, but Asa and Renée's real son turns out to be Ben Davidson, adoptive brother of Sam Rappaport and love interest of Asa's former daughter-in-law Victoria "Viki" Lord Carpenter. Asa and Renée divorce in 2001.

Renée and Asa remarry for the last time on February 14, 2004. The marriage ends with Asa's offscreen death on August 16, 2007. Afterwards, Renée is seldom seen, but resides in Llanview running the Palace Hotel. On August 23 and 24, 2011, Renée is seen at Asa's gravesite alongside his son, Bo Buchanan, in honor of the fourth anniversary of Asa's death.

== Rafe Garretson ==
Rafe Garretson
- One Life to Live character
- Portrayed by: Ken Meeker
- Duration: 1980–91
- First appearance: February 1980
- Last appearance: 1991
- Created by: Gordon Russell; Sam Hall
- Introduced by: Joseph Stuart
In-universe information
- Family: Buchanan
- Parents: Miguel Garretson
- Stepmother: Jeannie Buchanan Garretson
- Wife: Samantha Vernon (1984); Delilah Ralston (1986–)
- Children: Sammi Garretson
- Uncles: Asa Buchanan; Pike Buchanan
- First cousins: Clint Buchanan; Bo Buchanan; Ben Davidson; Austin Buchanan

Rafe Garretson is a fictional character on the ABC Daytime soap opera on One Life to Live originated by Ken Meeker in February 1980. Meekler continued in the role until his last appearance on the series in 1991. Rafe was the nephew of wealthy Asa Buchannan and was utilized by his uncle to take care of Asa's presumed dead wife Olympia. After Asa's marriage to Samantha Vernon came to an end, Rafe fell in love with her and they were married. When a pregnant Samantha was shot and ended up brain dead, Delilah Ralston took on her embryo, eventually giving birth to a daughter, Sammi. Delilah and Rafe fell in love and were married, but after she was kidnapped by the Sanders family, he was left alone until she turned up a year later. They were still married when Delilah left to pursue a singing career in 1989, and Rafe eventually left Llanview too two years later.

== Sammi Garretson ==
Sammi Garretson
- One Life to Live character
- Portrayed by: Danielle Harris (1985–1989); (and others)
- Duration: 1985–89
- First appearance: May 16, 1985
- Last appearance: December 20, 1989
- Created by: Peggy O'Shea
- Introduced by: Paul Rauch
In-universe information
- Family: Buchanan
- Parents: Rafe Garretson; Samantha Vernon; Delilah Ralston (legal)
- Grandparents: Miguel Garretson; Jeannie Buchanan Garretson; Will Vernon; Naomi Vernon
- Aunts and uncles: Brad Vernon
- First cousins: Kristine Karr

Samantha "Sammi" Garretson is a fictional character on the ABC Daytime soap opera on One Life to Live. The character was considered a "miracle child", extracted as an embryo from the womb of her recently deceased mother Samantha Vernon and implanted in a family friend Delilah Ralston, whom her father Rafe later married. First appearing onscreen at birth May 16, 1985, the character was soon SORASed to a six-year-old at the introduction of child actor Danielle Harris to the role, and last appeared in 1989.

== Roger Gordon ==
Roger Gordon
- One Life to Live character
- Portrayed by: Larry Pine
- Duration: 1988–92
- First appearance: September 22, 1988
- Last appearance: 1992
- Created by: S. Michael Schnessel
- Introduced by: Paul Rauch
In-universe information
- Occupation: Archeologist
- Spouse: Victoria Lord (pre-1968); Carrie Gordon (post-1968)
- Children: Megan Gordon; Sarah Gordon; Anna Gordon

Roger Gordon is a fictional character on the ABC Daytime soap opera One Life to Live. The role was played by actor Larry Pine from its debut in 1988 through 1992.

Roger Gordon, an archaeologist, arrived on the scene determined to convince both his daughters to move away from Llanview with him. Just as he and Sarah were about to leave town (after having convinced Megan to follow them to California), Roger overheard news that Viki had found the long-lost daughter she had spent months searching for, and changed his plans, refusing to leave town. Roger knew that the 'long-lost daughter' was a fraud - because Megan was the real missing Lord heir.

As a child, Roger Gordon's family participated in Victor Lord's disastrous, secret 'Eterna' project (in which a small underground city was created under Llantano Mountain). Against the wishes of the Eterna citizens themselves, they were sealed off from the outside world and abandoned to die. Roger's parents managed to break their teenaged son out of imprisonment. Once outside, Roger met and fell in love with a then-teenaged Victoria Lord. The teens married, had sex, and Viki became pregnant with Roger's child. But Victor intervened, and instigated an accident that turned Viki into her alter ego Niki Smith for many months. Niki ran away to New York City and carried her baby to full term. Just as she was about to give birth, Victor tracked her down and forced her to return to Llanview with him. A very young Larry Wolek (still in med school at the time) delivered the baby, and Niki reverted to Viki immediately afterward. Victor hushed up the whole incident (including hiring a hypnotist to erase Viki's memory of the incident) and gave the baby to Roger. Roger later married Carrie Gordon, and the two passed Megan off as their own child (Carrie was the birth mother of Sarah & Anna. She was already divorced from Roger when he arrived in Llanview. Carrie appeared only rarely.)

Roger confessed to Viki that Megan was their daughter. Megan was initially less than thrilled to hear the news (she and Viki did not get along), but then developed a close rapport with Viki and the Buchanan family (especially Viki's other daughter Jessica). Both Roger and Viki began to feel their old teenaged passions rekindling, even though Viki was married to Clint at the time. However, Roger eventually realized he could never have what he once had with Viki, so he left town and allowed Viki to get on with her life.

== Megan Gordon ==
Megan Gordon
- One Life to Live character
- Portrayed by: Jessica Tuck
- Duration: 1988–93; 1999; 2004; 2012
- First appearance: July 27, 1988
- Last appearance: January 9, 2012
- Created by: S. Michael Schnessel
- Introduced by: Paul Rauch
In-universe information
- Other names: Megan Gordon (maiden name); Ruby Bright (alternate personality)
- Occupation: Actress
- Family: Lord
- Parents: Roger Gordon; Victoria Lord
- Stepfather: Clint Buchanan
- Stepmother: Carrie Gordon
- Half-brothers: Kevin Buchanan; Joey Buchanan
- Half-sisters: Sarah Gordon; Anna Gordon; Natalie Buchanan; Jessica Buchanan
- Spouse: Jake Harrison (1991–92)
- Grandparents: Victor Lord; Eugenia Randolph Lord
- Aunts and uncles: Tony Lord; Meredith Lord; Tina Lord; Todd Manning; Victor Lord, Jr.
- Nieces and nephews: Duke Buchanan; Megan Buchanan; Bree Brennan; Ryder Ford; Liam McBain
- First cousins: Brian Kendall; Daniel Wolek; C. J. Roberts; Sarah Roberts; Starr Manning; Danielle Manning; Jack Manning; Sam Manning

Megan Gordon Harrison is a fictional character on the ABC Daytime soap opera One Life to Live. The role was originated in July 1988 by actress Jessica Tuck, who regularly appeared until February 12, 1992. Tuck returned for guest appearances in July 15 to 17, 1992; 1993, 1999, 2004, and 2012.

=== Character history ===
Larry Wolek tries to talk Viki out of attending her high school reunion in 1988; it is soon revealed that Viki had left school and had a baby — delivered by Larry. Viki's father Victor had sent her to a hypnotist, who had wiped away all memories of the experience. Viki is determined to find her daughter; meeting Roger Gordon ultimately brings Viki's memories flooding back in 1989. Roger and Viki had fallen in love, but his apparent death had shocked Viki into reverting into Niki Smith; Niki had been in control during the pregnancy, with Viki re-emerging briefly during childbirth. One of Roger's daughters is Viki's child; unfortunately, it is not sweet family friend Sarah, but her self-absorbed sister Megan Gordon — despised by Viki since Megan's appearance in Llanview in 1988. Megan, a soap opera star and major diva, has a passionate romance with Max Holden and feuds with rival actress Summer Skye while working on Bo Buchanan's soap Fraternity Row. Later, Megan softens towards Viki and develops a close relationship with her mother, then settles down with dashing international man of mystery Jake Harrison, her true love. But love cannot save Megan from the ravages of lupus, which takes her life on February 7, 1992. Surrounded by friends and family, Megan dies in Jake's arms, and later appears as a blithe spirit to help Jake and her loved ones through troubled times.

Megan appears as a vision to her sister Jessica Buchanan in 1999 when she miscarries her baby, Megan Buchanan, who is named after her. Megan makes a spiritual visitation to Viki in 2004, and helps her mother cope with the loss of her husband Ben Davidson. In 2008, when Victoria goes to Heaven again after a car crash, her granddaughter Megan reveals that she works with her aunt Megan, who is currently absent due to being at a network meeting. On January 9, 2012, Megan appears to Viki during her third trip to Heaven. This time Megan tries to guide and convince her mother to cross over into the afterlife, after Viki continually comments how she is so tired. However, as Viki and Megan approach Heaven's gates, Clint goes running up from Hell, declares his love for her and states how they have conquered the odds before, and that can do so again. Clint's words prove stronger than Megan's as Viki ultimately chooses to give life another chance with Clint and is revived by paramedics, as Megan smiles on happily.

== Sarah Gordon ==
Sarah Gordon Buchanan
- One Life to Live character
- Portrayed by: Jensen Buchanan (1987–90); Grace Phillips (1991–93)
- Duration: 1987–1993
- First appearance: November 17, 1987
- Last appearance: March 15, 1993
- Created by: S. Michael Schnessel
- Introduced by: Paul Rauch (1987); Linda Gottlieb (1991)
In-universe information
- Occupation: Therapist
- Parents: Roger Gordon; Carrie Gordon
- Sisters: Anna Gordon
- Half-sisters: Megan Gordon
- Spouse: Bo Buchanan (1990–1992)

Sarah Gordon Buchanan is a fictional character on the ABC Daytime soap opera, One Life to Live. The role was originated by actress Jensen Buchanan in 1987, a role she played until September 24, 1990. Buchanan made a voiceover appearance on October 22, 1990, when the character was presumed dead. Grace Phillips stepped into the role in 1991, playing the character through 1993.

=== Character history ===
Sarah, nicknamed "Paradise" by Bo, was the first member of the Gordon family to arrive in Llanview. While she was only on the show for a short time, she was a part of many memorable storylines, including Mendorra and Badderly Island. Born off-screen in 1965 to Roger and Carrie Gordon, Sarah grew up as the second of three daughters and came to Llanview in October 1987. As a therapist specializing in training newly-blind people to live without their sight, Sarah became a counsellor to Clint Buchanan, who had been blinded by a gunshot wound to the head. Early on, Sarah stated that her desire to help the blind was inspired by working with her sister Anna (never seen) who was blind from birth and died young. Sarah started out as Tina Lord's rival for Cord Roberts' affection, but Sarah and Cord never progressed far in their relationship. She later met the love of her life, Bo Buchanan, on the set of Fraternity Row, where she was working as a consultant. Though the two were deeply in love with each other, they often found themselves in dangerous situations that threatened their future. In 1989, Bo was sentenced to time in prison after being found guilty of killing Alicia Grande. Believing that Bo was being framed by his cousin Austin Buchanan, Sarah set out to get the truth and exonerate Bo by seducing Austin (who was obsessed with her) and tricking him into telling her the truth. Her plan, which was successful, had dire consequences. After discovering the tape recorder that Sarah was hiding under her blouse, Austin forced her to have sex in Asa's garage. Bo was ultimately set free thanks to the recorded confession, but Sarah's relationship with Bo suffered because she refused to tell him the truth about the rape; she was terrified that Bo would never be able to love her the same way again if he found out that she had been violated by Austin. Unfortunately, Sarah was not able to keep the truth from Bo when she discovered that she was pregnant with Austin's baby. Always supportive, Bo stood by Sarah as she struggled with the decision to terminate the pregnancy or not. Ultimately she never had to make a choice because she suffered a miscarriage.

Despite the drama resulting from Austin's rampage, Bo and Sarah's relationship blossomed and the two became engaged. Their plan was to marry on Valentine's Day 1990, but Sarah was once again swept up into trouble when she was summoned to the kingdom of Mendorra to work with the future king, Prince Raymond, who was progressively losing his sight. Accompanied by Megan and Ambassador to Mendorra, Dorian Lord, Sarah walked right into a trap set by Raymond's scheming brother Roland. In an effort to steal the throne from his brother, Roland kidnapped Megan and Dorian to force Sarah into a marriage with his brother. Because Sarah was a commoner, Raymond would have to abdicate the throne, making Roland next in line. Little did Roland suspect that Bo and his nephew Cord were on their way to Mendorra to save Sarah, Megan and Dorian after Sarah subtly signalled her fiancé that something was wrong during a live television broadcast. Unbeknownst to Roland, Bo took Raymond's place at the altar and married Sarah in a lavish royal wedding, thwarting his plans to become king. With Raymond's help, Bo, Sarah, and Megan were finally able to escape from Mendorra, but only after Raymond was forced to shoot and kill his brother near the Austrian/Mendorran border. A little over a month later, on March 21, Bo and Sarah were legally married in a small ceremony held at Llanfair.

Soon after, Bo planned a location shoot for a prime time Fraternity Row movie and after looking at several exotic locations, he settled on Badderly, an island off the coast of Canada that was home to a deserted four-star resort. It seemed like the perfect location with private beaches and a large estate, but he was not the only one who had his eyes set on the secluded island resort. Johnny Dee, Carlo Hesser's lawyer and secret son, had arranged a meeting on Badderly with Frank "Whitey" Whitehead, one of Carlo's rivals, and several other top mob bosses to forge an uneasy peace with one another and discuss their plans to flood Llanview with drugs, which were being manufactured on the island. What Johnny had not counted on was Bo ending up with Whitey's invitation to the meeting. Because no one knew what the real Whitey looked liked (he always avoided having his picture taken), Bo was easily mistaken for the reclusive Whitehead by Johnny and his guests and welcomed into the soiree. To make matters worse, Sarah, Megan, Cord, Lucky Lippmann and Spring Skye also ended up on the island, each one taking on a new persona to pose as Whitey's entourage. Sarah, using a fake Texas accent and donning a curly blond wig, found herself constantly having to run interference for Bo after Hesser's daughter, Charlotte, set her sights on seducing him. It was not until Jake Harrison arrived on Badderly days later that Charlotte forgot all about "Whitey" and shifted her focus to Jake. After several more days on the island and a few mishaps later (Megan nearly drowning and Sarah almost dying in a pit of quicksand), Bo and his crew finally discovered the secret location of the drug manufacturing lab and were able to destroy the operation and bring down Johnny and his men. Thinking that the entire ordeal was over, everyone returned to Llanview to get back to their lives.

Sarah became a witness to the drug-trafficking activities of Carlo Hesser, who kidnapped her, and was thought to have killed her. Sarah turned up alive, just as Bo was about to marry Cassie Callison. Sarah and Bo divorced, but reconciled, all during a time in which Sarah was a major suspect in the first murder investigation of Carlo Hesser. Tragically, Sarah was killed on November 25, 1992, when the car she was riding in with Bo was run off of Llantano Bridge by a truck on the night before their wedding. Their car landed in the water and Sarah, who was not wearing her seat belt, died shortly after impact while Bo sustained only minor injuries.

== Lee Halpern ==
Lee Halpern
- One Life to Live character
- Portrayed by: Janet Zarish
- Duration: 1987–88; 2008–09
- First appearance: 1987
- Last appearance: February 3, 2009
- Introduced by: Paul Rauch; Frank Valentini (2008)
In-universe information
- Other names: Carol Harper (maiden name); Carol Harper Dennison; Janet Ketring
- Occupation: Prostitute; Registered nurse
- Spouse: Tom Dennison (pre-1986–88); Charles Sanders (1987)
- Children: Mari Lynn Dennison

Lee Halpern (originally Carol Harper; formerly Dennison) is a fictional character from the ABC Daytime soap opera One Life to Live. The role was first played by Janet Zarish from 1987 until 1988, then again from April 2, 2008, until November 11, 2008, and January 12, 2009 until February 3, 2009. In 2008, the character assumes the alias Janet Ketring.

Lee Halpern arrives in Llanview in 1987. She was previously a prostitute for Renee Divine and is now business partner of Max Holden. She marries Charles Sanders, former US Ambassador to the European principality of Mendorra, during a drunken night in Las Vegas, and he dies of a heart attack on their wedding night. It is soon revealed that Lee is in fact Carol Harper Dennison, the presumed-dead wife of Tom Dennison and mother to Tom's daughter, Mari Lynn. Despite some awkwardness at first, Lee builds a relationship with Mari Lynn and Tom. While trying to protect her mother from the villainous Donald LaMarr, Mari Lynn accidentally fatally shoots Lee, or so it seems. (Note: In the October 13, 2008 episode, John McBain reiterates that Lee/Janet faked her death in 1988.)

In April 2008, private nurse Janet Ketring appears in Llanview, helping Lee Ramsey care for a bedridden and amnesiac Marty Saybrooke. Ramsey is killed and Todd Manning secretly takes custody of Marty, who all of Llanview believes had been killed in an explosion in December 2007. Todd coerces Janet to continue tending to Marty under his employ. For the sum of $1 million, Janet also agrees to keep Marty's existence a secret. Neither Marty nor Janet are aware that Todd had raped Marty over a decade before. Seeking absolution for his crimes against Marty at any cost, Todd lies about their relationship as well as the existence of Marty's son. During a conversation with Todd, Janet reveals that she is estranged from her loved ones and claims she is "dead to them." Llanview Police Detective John McBain discovers that Janet is, in fact, Lee Halpern. He uses this information to try to pressure Janet into revealing that her mystery patient is, as he now suspects, the presumed-dead Marty. Janet is horrified to hear from John that Todd had raped Marty and is keeping her from her son. Janet confronts Todd, who also knows her true identity and threatens to expose her unless she continues to keep his secret. He soon forces her to assist him in his intended kidnapping of his unborn grandchild. Todd calls off the plan, but his mentally ill niece Jessica Buchanan switches her own stillborn baby girl with the new-born daughter of Todd's daughter Starr Manning. With Starr's baby believed dead, Janet leaves Llanview on November 11, 2008, but reappears on Renee Buchanan's doorstep on January 9, 2009, desperate for sanctuary. Janet fears prosecution and Todd's wrath, but soon agrees to cooperate with the authorities. Todd catches her wearing a wire, but Janet is kept in protective custody. Todd publishes an exposé on Janet in his newspaper, The Sun, to sabotage her credibility before the upcoming trial. Terrified that one of the people she had conned will come after her, Janet escapes police custody. Todd discovers Janet stabbed to death on his living room floor on January 30, 2009. Believing that Todd is innocent but realizing that he would be blamed, Téa confesses to the police that she had stabbed Janet in self defense, and Janet's body is taken away. Powell Lord III later confesses to the murder, as part of his plan to punish anyone who has hurt Marty and punish Todd.

== Andy Harrison ==
Andy Harrison
- One Life to Live character
- Portrayed by: Bronwen Booth (1989–91); Wendee Pratt (1994–97)
- Duration: 1989–91; 1994–97
- First appearance: October 5, 1989
- Last appearance: August 4, 1997
- Created by: S. Michael Schnessel
- Introduced by: Paul Rauch (1989); Linda Gottlieb (1994)
In-universe information
- Other names: Andy Guthrie; Andy Vega
- Parents: Baxter Harrison; Patricia Holden
- Half-brothers: Jake Harrison; Max Holden; Steve Holden
- Spouse: Hunter Guthrie (1991–9?); Antonio Vega (1997–2000)
- Nieces and nephews: Al Holden; Steven Holden, Jr.; Frankie Holden; Leslie Holden

Andrea "Andy" Harrison (formerly Guthrie and Vega) is a fictional character on the ABC Daytime soap opera One Life to Live. The role was originated by Bronwen Booth from October 5, 1989, through August 26, 1991. Wendee Pratt assumed the role upon its reappearance onscreen on September 13, 1994, playing the character through 1997.

=== Character history ===
Max Holden's sister Andrea arrives in fictional Llanview in August 1989 with news of their mother Patricia's death; Max and Andy's volatile relationship eventually cooled before she left town in 1991 after marrying Hunter Guthrie. She would return in 1994 (divorced from the abusive Hunter) as a police officer, and become involved with fellow officer and ex-con Antonio Vega, who she had a whirlwind romance with, before marrying him and leaving again for Berkeley, California, in 1997. Years later, Andy and Antonio's marriage ended when Andy cheated on him with her partner on the police force.

== Al Holden ==
Al Holden
- One Life to Live character
- Portrayed by: Kirk and Robert Raisch (1988–90); Ryan and Sean Buckley (1990–91); Evan Bonifant (1991–93); Michael Roman (1993–94); Eddie Karr (1994); Jason Alexander Fischer (1994–97); Michael Tipps (2001); Nathaniel Marston (2001–04)
- Duration: 1987–97; 2001–04
- First appearance: April 30, 1987
- Last appearance: February 16, 2004
- Created by: Peggy O'Shea
- Introduced by: Paul Rauch (1987); Gary Tomlin (2001)
In-universe information
- Other names: Albert Roberts; Alonzo Buchanan
- Parents: Max Holden; Gabrielle Medina
- Siblings: Frankie Holden; Leslie Holden
- Grandparents: Wingate Holden; Patricia Holden; Dante Medina; Julia Wheaton
- Aunts and uncles: Steve Holden; Andy Harrison; Debra Medina
- First cousins: Steven Holden, Jr.

Alonzo "Al" Holden is a fictional character on the American soap opera, One Life to Live. Originally introduced in April 1987, Al was first featured as a regular character in 2001 played by Michael Tipps from March through November 2001. Nathaniel Marston assumed the role from December 4, 2001, until Al's onscreen death on September 22, 2003, and as Al's spirit through his last appearance on February 14, 2004. Marston immediately began playing the role of Michael McBain, whose body Al's spirit inhabited, thereafter in 2004.

== Steve Holden ==
Steve Holden
- One Life to Live character
- Portrayed by: Russ Anderson
- Duration: 1987–89
- First appearance: March 1987
- Last appearance: April 27, 1989
- Created by: Peggy O'Shea
- Introduced by: Paul Rauch
In-universe information
- Parents: Wingate Holden; Patricia Holden
- Siblings: Max Holden; Andy Harrison
- Spouse: Gabrielle Medina (1988)
- Children: Steven Holden, Jr.
- Nieces and nephews: Al Holden; Frankie Holden; Leslie Holden

Steven "Steve" Holden, Sr. is a fictional character on the ABC Daytime soap opera One Life to Live. The role was played by Russ Anderson from March 1987 through the character's onscreen death November 30, 1988.

=== Character history ===
Max Holden's brother Steve Holden arrives in fictional Llanview in March 1987 and soon begins a relationship with and marries Max's first love, Gabrielle Medina. Gabrielle's perpetual feeling for Max doom their relationship and they divorce. In 1988, at the double wedding of Cord Roberts to Tina Lord and Asa Buchanan to Renée Divine, Steve notices a bomb in a wedding cake and throws himself on it to protect his fiancée Brenda McGillis. Brenda gives birth Steve's child, his namesake, in 1989.

== Dante Medina ==
Dante Medina
- One Life to Live character
- Portrayed by: Henry Darrow
- Duration: 1987
- Created by: Peggy O'Shea
- Introduced by: Paul Rauch
In-universe information
- Occupation: Drug kingpin
- Spouse: Julia Wheaton (?–1987)
- Children: Gabrielle Medina; Debra Medina
- Grandchildren: Al Holden

Dante Medina is a fictional character on the ABC Daytime soap opera One Life to Live. The role was played by actor Henry Darrow for months in 1987.

== Debra Medina ==
Debra Medina
- One Life to Live character
- Portrayed by: Lucinda Fisher
- Duration: 1989–90
- First appearance: August 16, 1989
- Last appearance: May 11, 1990
- Created by: S. Michael Schnessel
- Introduced by: Paul Rauch
In-universe information
- Parents: Dante Medina; Julia Wheaton
- Sisters: Gabrielle Medina
- Nephews: Al Holden

Debra Medina is a fictional character on the ABC Daytime soap opera One Life to Live. The role was played by Lucinda Fisher from August 1989 through May 1990.

== Julia Medina ==
Julia Medina
- One Life to Live character
- Portrayed by: Linda Thorson
- Duration: 1989–92
- First appearance: August 16, 1989
- Last appearance: June 1992
- Created by: S. Michael Schnessel
- Introduced by: Paul Rauch
In-universe information
- Spouse: Dante Medina (until 1987)
- Children: Gabrielle Medina; Debra Medina
- Grandchildren: Al Holden

Julia Medina (also Wheaton) is a fictional character on the ABC Daytime soap opera One Life to Live. The role was played by actress Linda Thorson from July 1989 through June 1992. In December 1990, it was reported that Thorson had been moved to recurring status. Julia originally came to town to aid her daughter Gabrielle and remained after she left town. Julia was revealed to be the accidental killer of DuAnn Demerest, the blackmailing housekeeper of Victoria Lord Buchanan, and was paralyzed for a time after being in a coma.

== Connie O'Neill ==
Connie O'Neill
- One Life to Live character
- Portrayed by: Elizabeth Keifer (1984–85, 1988); Terry Donahoe (1985–86)
- Duration: 1984–86; 1988
- First appearance: April 1984
- Last appearance: August 26, 1988
- Created by: Sam Hall; Peggy O'Shea
- Introduced by: Paul Rauch
In-universe information
- Parents: Harry O'Neill; Kathleen O'Neill
- Siblings: Joy O'Neill; Didi O'Neill
- Spouse: Brad Vernon (1986–88)
- Aunts and uncles: Pete O'Neill

Constance Kathleen "Connie" O'Neill (formerly Vernon) is a fictional character on the ABC Daytime serial One Life to Live. The role was originated by actress Elizabeth Keifer from April 1984 until 1985, reappearing briefly in 1988. Terry Donahoe assumed the role from August 1985 until September 1986.

== Didi O'Neill ==
Didi O'Neill Buchanan
- One Life to Live character
- Portrayed by: Barbara Treutelaar
- Duration: 1984–88
- First appearance: April 1984
- Last appearance: August 31, 1988
- Created by: Sam Hall; Peggy O'Shea
- Introduced by: Paul Rauch
In-universe information
- Occupation: Factory worker
- Parents: Harry O'Neill; Kathleen O'Neill
- Siblings: Connie O'Neill; Joy O'Neill
- Spouse: Bo Buchanan (1986–88)
- Aunts and uncles: Pete O'Neill

Deidra Cecilia "Didi" O'Neill Buchanan is a fictional character on the ABC Daytime soap opera One Life to Live. The role was portrayed by actress Barbara Treutelaar from April 1984 until the character's on-screen death on September 3, 1988.

== Harry O'Neill ==
Harry O'Neill
- One Life to Live character
- Portrayed by: Arlen Dean Snyder (1984); Frank Converse (1984–85)
- Duration: 1984–85
- First appearance: April 1984
- Last appearance: July 12, 1985
- Created by: Sam Hall; Peggy O'Shea
- Introduced by: Paul Rauch
In-universe information
- Occupation: Factory worker
- Siblings: Pete O'Neill
- Spouse: Kathleen O'Neill (pre-1984)
- Children: Connie O'Neill; Didi O'Neill; Joy O'Neill

Harry O'Neill is a fictional character on the ABC Daytime serial One Life to Live. The role was originated by Arlen Dean Snyder in April 1984. Frank Converse assumed the role in October 1984 through the character's onscreen death in July 1985.

=== Character history ===
Factory worker Harry O'Neill is introduced in April 1984 when he is about to lose his job at the Lord-Manning plant joint-owned by Victoria Lord Buchanan and her husband Clint Buchanan when they consider closing it for financial reasons. Harry soon engages in romance with Niki Smith, a personality symptom of Victoria's multiple personality disorder. The relationship ends when Harry is murdered in 1985 by con man Mitch Laurence, who had intended to kill Clint and frame Viki.

== Joy O'Neill ==
Joy O'Neill
- One Life to Live character
- Portrayed by: Kristen Vigard (1984–85); Julie Ann Johnson (1985–86; 1988)
- Duration: 1984–86; 1988
- First appearance: April 1984
- Last appearance: August 26, 1988
- Created by: Sam Hall; Peggy O'Shea
- Introduced by: Paul Rauch
In-universe information
- Parents: Harry O'Neill; Kathleen O'Neill
- Siblings: Didi O'Neill; Connie O'Neill
- Aunts and uncles: Pete O'Neill

Joy O'Neill is a fictional character on the ABC Daytime serial One Life to Live. The role was originated by actress Kristen Vigard from April 1984 until 1985. Julie Ann Johnson assumed the role from 1985 until the character left town in 1986. Johnson returned for a brief appearance in September 1988.

== Pete O'Neill ==
Pete O'Neill
- One Life to Live character
- Portrayed by: James O'Sullivan
- Duration: 1985–88
- First appearance: July 1985
- Last appearance: August 26, 1988
- Created by: Peggy O'Shea
- Introduced by: Paul Rauch
In-universe information
- Occupation: Lawyer
- Siblings: Harry O'Neill
- Spouse: Pamela Stuart (1987–2009)
- Children: Connie O'Neill; Didi O'Neill; Joy O'Neill

Pete O'Neill is fictional character on the ABC Daytime soap opera One Life to Live. The role was played by James O'Sullivan from July 1985 until 1987, with a brief return in September 1988.

=== Character history ===
Arriving in the wake of the death of his brother Harry, Pete O'Neill arrives in fictional Llanview in 1985 to support his family in their grief. A lawyer, he soon defends Tina Lord when she is accused of killing Harry, believing her alibi. Pete later falls for the ex-wife of business tycoon Asa Buchanan, Pamela Stuart, leaving town with her for her home island of Malakeva in 1987.

== Delilah Ralston ==
Delilah Ralston Garretson
- One Life to Live character
- Portrayed by: Shelly Burch
- Duration: 1982–89; 2001
- First appearance: January 1982
- Last appearance: November 19, 2001
- Created by: Sam Hall; Peggy O'Shea
- Introduced by: Joseph Stuart
- Crossover appearances: All My Children
In-universe information
- Occupation: Owner of Designs by Delilah
- Parents: Euphemia Ralston
- Spouse: Asa Buchanan (1983); Bo Buchanan (1983); Rafe Garretson (1987—)
- Adoptive children: Sammi Garretson
- Aunts and uncles: Twyla Ralston; Lamarr Ralston; Yancey Ralston
- First cousins: Drew Ralston

Delilah Ralston Garretson (formerly Buchanan) is a fictional character on the ABC Daytime soap opera One Life to Live. The role was portrayed by actress Shelly Burch from January 1982 until December 20, 1989. Burch briefly reprised the role in November 2001. She first came to Llanview, believing that Bo Buchannan was her cousin and married the wealthy Asa whose late wife Olympia had lied about Bo not being Asa's son. Delilah's scheming mother, Euphemia, knew the truth, and having vowed revenge on Asa for destroying her family, kept the secret. Asa and Delilah eventually divorced and she married Bo, but her constant lying caused him to leave her shortly into their marriage and fall in love with Didi O'Neill. Delilah showed she had a heart when the pregnant Samantha Garretson suddenly became brain dead and Delilah agreed to have Samantha's embryo transplanted into her. She eventually married her widower Rafe Garretson (Asa's nephew!) but was kidnapped by Elizabeth Sanders and her cohort Lord Henry Leighton as part of revenge against Asa. Delilah was eventually discovered (along with Bo) and reunited with Rafe. However, she left town to pursue a modeling career, only returning for one of Asa's several "fake" funerals.

== Euphemia Ralston ==
Euphemia Ralston
- One Life to Live character
- Portrayed by: Grayson Hall (1982–83)
- Duration: 1982–83
- First appearance: July 1982
- Last appearance: April 1983
- Created by: Sam Hall; Peggy O'Shea
- Introduced by: Joseph Stuart
In-universe information
- Siblings: Yancy Ralston
- Children: Delilah Ralston
- Other relatives: Drew Ralston, nephew; Twyla Ralston, cousin; Blanche Ralston, sister-in-law.

Euphemia Ralston is a fictional character on the ABC Daytime serial One Life to Live. The role was played by actress Grayson Hall from July 1982-April 1983. She was introduced as Euphemia Ralston Massey (although daughter Delilah used Euphemia's maiden name), the once wealthy owner of a Southern estate and now down on her luck because of a vendetta against her family by Asa Buchanan. In July 1982, Bo Buchanan, believing that Euphemia's late brother Yancy was his father, visited her, and Euphemia immediately began to put into motion a plot of revenge against Asa. She sent her nephew Drew to Llanview to ingratiate himself with Bo, and when she learned that her daughter Delilah had shown up to meet Bo, immediately went there for an extended visit. Asa, referring to Euphemia as "that witch in a turban", made a play for Delilah who had fallen in love with her own supposed cousin, Bo. To set her plans into motion, Euphemia encouraged Delilah to accept Asa's marriage proposal. Shortly afterwards, Asa was believed to have been killed in a boat explosion, but had survived, and hid out at his own funeral. Euphemia's somewhat eccentric cousin Twyla arrived and threatened Euphemia's plans with the knowledge that Yancy was sterile, and this was confirmed when Yancy's widow Blanche showed up. Cousin Twyla spilt the beans that Euphemia had known the truth all along, and Delilah ordered her mother to leave town.

== David Renaldi ==
David Renaldi
- One Life to Live character
- Portrayed by: Michael Zaslow (1983–1986, 1998); Vincent Baggetta (1984)
- Duration: 1983–1986; 1998
- First appearance: May 1983
- Last appearance: December 1, 1998
- Created by: Henry Slesar
- Introduced by: Joseph Stuart (1983); Jill Farren Phelps (1998)
In-universe information
- Other names: David Reynolds (legal name)
- Occupation: Pianist; Spy
- Parents: Sam Reynolds; Ms. Howard
- Spouse: Jenny Wolek (1984–1997)
- Children: Cassie Reynolds

David "David Renaldi" Reynolds is a fictional character on the ABC Daytime soap opera One Life to Live. The role was originated by actor Michael Zaslow in May 1983 through August 1984. The role was recast with Vincent Baggetta until the character was written out three months later, followed by Zaslow returning for limited runs between 1985 and 1986. Zaslow reprised the role suffering from Amyotrophic lateral sclerosis (a fate mirrored for the character) onscreen in May 1998, appearing onscreen in the role until shortly before his death from the disease in December of that year.

Born as David Reynolds, he was a composer and conductor who used the name David Renaldi professionally. He came to Llanview hired to conduct the orchestra, and became friends with Viki Buchanan. He and Dr. Dorian Callison had known each other before either came to Llanview, as he was, in fact, the father of Cassie Callison. He fell in love with Jenny Wolek Siegel Vernon, R. N., in a Romeo and Juliet type romance. Jenny and David married and left Llanview to move to Switzerland.

== C.J. Roberts ==
C.J. Roberts
- One Life to Live character
- Portrayed by: Tyler Noyes (1992–97) (and other child actors)
- Duration: 1988–97
- First appearance: 1988
- Last appearance: 1997
- Created by: Peggy O'Shea
- Introduced by: Paul Rauch
In-universe information
- Occupation: U. S. Navy SEAL
- Family: Lord; Buchanan
- Parents: Cord Roberts; Tina Lord
- Sisters: Sarah Roberts
- Grandparents: Clint Buchanan; Maria Roberts; Victor Lord; Irene Manning
- Aunts and uncles: Rex Balsom; Natalie Buchanan; Kevin Buchanan (adoptive); Joey Buchanan (adoptive); Jessica Buchanan; Victoria Lord; Meredith Lord; Tony Lord; Todd Manning; Victor Lord, Jr.
- First cousins: Kevin Buchanan; Joey Buchanan; Megan Gordon; Natalie Buchanan; Jessica Buchanan; Brian Kendall; Starr Manning; Danielle Manning; Jack Manning; Sam Manning; Duke Buchanan (adoptive); Shane Balsom; Liam McBain; Bree Brennan; Ryder Ford

Clinton James "C.J." Roberts is a fictional character from the original ABC Daytime soap opera One Life to Live. The character is first shown on-screen in April 1987 and was portrayed by child actors, most notably Tyler Noyes from 1992 to 1997.

Cord Roberts happily marries social climber and heiress, Tina Lord in April 1986. In 1987, Cord's mother, Maria Roberts does not approve of the relationship and convinces Max Holden to take Tina to Argentina where she soon discovers she is pregnant. Meanwhile, Cord marries Kate Sanders. Cord follows Tina to Argentina where Max and Tina have gotten mixed up with crime lord, Carlo Hesser and his drug ring. Carlo sends Tina over a waterfall in a raft; Tina and her unborn child are presumed dead. Tina survives and meets up with Gabrielle Medina, Max's former lover and convinces her that she and Max are now married. Gabrielle gives her and Max's new-born son to Tina so they can raise him. Tina returns to Llanview with baby Al, named after Cord's late step-father. Maria soon learns about Al's true identity and blackmails Tina into divorcing Cord in July 1987.

In 1988, it is learned that Tina's real son did not die, but was being cared for in the Argentinean jungle under the name "Milagro". Max's enemies later kidnap the infant and place him in an Italian convent; Tina must pose as nun to get him back. Cord and Tina later name him Clinton James, after Cord's biological father, Clint Buchanan. After Tina and Cord's divorce in January 1990, C.J. and Tina move to San Diego.

In February 1991, C.J. becomes a big brother to Sarah Victoria. When Cord is presumed dead in 1992, C.J. and Sarah become attached to their mother's new boyfriend, Cain Rogan. Cord returns in 1993, suffering from post traumatic stress syndrome. Tina marries Cain in 1994 and leaves town, leaving Cord to raise the kids. She returns in July 1994 and rededicates her life to raising C.J. and Sarah.

Convicted rapist Todd Manning escapes from prison, but saves the lives of C.J., Sarah, and their cousin Jessica Buchanan. A man named David Vickers comes to town, claiming to be Tina's long lost brother; soon Tina joins forces with imposter David to unsuccessfully try to swindle the massive inheritance from her and Viki's real brother, Todd Manning. Ultimately, Tina moves to Baltimore with C.J. and Sarah in June 1996, the three returning briefly in 1997 to say good bye to Cord as he leaves for London.

In February 2003, Sarah, now going by the nickname "Flash", comes to town searching for her brother C.J.. Sarah reveals that Tina's parenting forced C.J. and Sarah to run away from home. It is soon discovered that C.J. has joined the U. S. Navy and was deploying to the Indian Ocean. Later that year, Al Holden, the baby that C.J. was switched with as a child, dies at the age of 22, which revises their birth year to 1981. Tina calls C.J. on the day his parents tie the knot for the fourth time in 2011.

== Maria Roberts ==
Maria Roberts
- One Life to Live character
- Portrayed by: BarBara Luna (1986–88); Melissa Archer (2008)
- Duration: 1986–88; 2008
- First appearance: May 16, 1986
- Last appearance: 2008
- Created by: Peggy O'Shea
- Introduced by: Paul Rauch
In-universe information
- Other names: Maria Vasquez (maiden name)
- Parents: Mr Vasquez; Rosa Vasquez
- Siblings: George Vasquez
- Husband: Al Roberts (1968–86)
- Sons: Cord Roberts
- Grandchildren: C. J. Roberts; Sarah Roberts
- Grandparents: Cody Vasquez; May McGillis

Maria Roberts (maiden name Vasquez) is a fictional character on the ABC soap opera One Life to Live. Maria was portrayed by BarBara Luna from May 1986 until the character's onscreen death in 1987. Melissa Archer briefly played the role in a July 2008 storyline that took several characters back in time to the show's inception year of 1968. Maria is the mother of long-running character Cord Roberts.

=== Storylines ===
History revisited during the show's 40th anniversary episodes in 2008, around the series inception in 1968, Maria Vasquez becomes pregnant with the love child of Clint Buchanan. Clint's father, Asa, uncovered the pregnancy before Clint was told. Because Maria was of Mexican heritage, Asa condescended Maria and refused to allow her to marry Clint (as Clint may have characteristically done). Asa pressured Maria into abandoning Clint without ever telling him about the baby. Maria married the sturdy, reliable ranch hand Al Roberts instead, and gave birth to a boy named Cordero "Cord" Roberts. The Roberts family lived in El Paso, Texas. Al was a good husband and father, even though he knew Cord was not truly his son. Cord grew up believing that Al was his father. Maria however nursed a bitter grudge against Asa and spent her life pining for Clint.

In 1986, when Cord expressed an interest in photography, Maria attempted to send Clint a telegram asking him to provide Cord a job at The Banner. Tina was in the midst of a bitter feud with Clint at the time. She intercepted the request and snooped about in El Paso, hoping to get some dirt on him. Cord met and quickly fell for Tina Clayton, and followed her back to Llanview. Tina reciprocated his interest, but had no intention of marrying a blue collar cowboy like Cord...until she discovered that he was Clint's biological son, and potential heir to the Buchanan estate. After learning that, she wasted no time marrying him. Maria viewed Tina as a gold-digging tramp and became bitter enemies with her.

Al Roberts died of a heart attack. With no-one keeping her in El Paso, Maria relocated to Llanview to be near her son. By then, she had grown strong enough to hold her own against Asa's threats. Eventually she confessed to both Clint and Cord that they were father and son, and Clint welcomed Cord into the Buchanan family. Maria wheedled her way into both Clint and Viki's lives, pretending to be just an 'old friend' to Clint. But she secretly conspired to break up their marriage. Maria had two overwhelming desires - to win Clint's love once again, and to break up Tina and Cord.

Maria brought Tom Dennison to Llanview, hoping Viki would leave Clint for him. That failed to happen. Later, Maria discovered before anyone else that Allison Perkins had kidnapped Viki's newborn baby Jessica. Maria secretly helped Allison return the baby, but arranged to make it look as if Viki had become Niki Smith again and kidnapped her own baby. Her shenanigans were ultimately discovered, and Clint railed against her for her evil deeds. Going completely off the deep end, Maria attempted to poison Viki, and frame Tina for the crime, only to become tainted by the fatal poison herself and die.

== Jon Russell ==
Jon Russell
- One Life to Live character
- Portrayed by: John Martin
- Duration: 1986–89; 1991–92
- First appearance: May 6, 1986
- Last appearance: June 24, 1992
- Created by: Peggy O'Shea
- Introduced by: Paul Rauch
- Crossover appearances: General Hospital
In-universe information
- Occupation: Private investigator, Lawyer
- Siblings: Judith Russell
- Nieces and nephews: Kate Sanders; Jamie Sanders; Geoff McGrath

Jon Russell is a fictional character on the ABC Daytime soap opera One Life to Live. The role was played by actor John Martin from May 6, 1986 through December 27, 1989, and from March 19, 1991 until 1992. Jon Russell was romantically involved with Dorian Lord, her daughter Cassie Callison who was a partner with him in the private eye business, and Audrey Ames, an actress on the fictional Fraternity Row. He defended Gabrielle Medina Holden in 1989 when she was charged with the baby switching crime of Michael Grande's baby Garrick Grande and Brenda McGillis' baby Steven Holden McGillis. He also served as a producer for "Fraternity Row" while Bo Buchanan was wrongly sentenced to prison for killing Alicia Grande. Jon is also the brother of Judith Russell Sanders

== Judith Russell Sanders ==
Judith Russell Sanders
- One Life to Live character
- Portrayed by: Louise Sorel
- Duration: 1986–87
- First appearance: August 5, 1986
- Last appearance: 1987
- Created by: Peggy O'Shea
- Introduced by: Paul Rauch
In-universe information
- Other names: Judith Sanders
- Occupation: Lawyer
- Siblings: Jon Russell
- Spouse: Charles Sanders (?–1987)
- Children: Kate Sanders; Jamie Sanders
- Stepchildren: Geoff McGrath

Judith Russell (formerly Sanders) is a fictional character on the ABC Daytime soap opera One Life to Live. The role appeared and was played by actress Louise Sorel from August 1986 through November 1987.

=== Character history ===
Judith Russell Sanders first arrives in fictional Llanview in August 1986 as the D.A. in Dorian Lord's murder trial for Mitch Lawrence. Her husband Charles Sanders, the former ambassador from Mendora, arrives soon thereafter hoping to mend their crumbling marriage, as did their children Jamie and Kate. It is established that the Sanders family has lived in Llanview for years. Judith was a free-spirited idealistic lawyer who never truly fit into the conservative, aristocratic lifestyle maintained by Charles, whose mother, Elizabeth, felt prejudiced against Judith because she was Jewish. The two eventually divorce but remained friends, and Judith even made amends with Elizabeth. Judith engages in an affair with fellow attorney Herb Callison (Dorian's ex-husband) before leaving Llanview after in 1987 after ex-husband Charles dies and Kate's marriage to Cord ended upon Tina Lord's return from the dead.

== Charles Sanders ==
Charles Sanders
- One Life to Live character
- Portrayed by: Peter Brown
- Duration: 1986–87
- First appearance: December 1986
- Last appearance: 1987
- Created by: Peggy O'Shea
- Introduced by: Paul Rauch
In-universe information
- Occupation: Ambassador to Mendorra
- Parents: Charles Sanders, Jr.; Elizabeth Sanders
- Spouse: Judith Russell (?–1987); Lee Halpern (1987)
- Children: Kate Sanders; Jamie Sanders; Geoff McGrath

Charles Sanders III is a fictional character on the ABC Daytime soap opera One Life to Live. The role appeared and was originated by actor Michael Billington for one episode and then played by actor Peter Brown from September 1986 through September 1987.

=== Character history ===
Charles Sanders arrives in fictional Llanview soon after his wife Judtih in September 1986 to save their marriage. Unfortunately, the two could not resolve their differences over issues with their children and his mother Elizabeth's feelings of anti-Semitism towards her, and divorced. Judith subsequently has an affair with Herb Callison, while Charles romanced Dr.Dorian Lord as part of a money-making scheme. When Dorian realizes Charles is using her, she turns the tables on him by revealing that he had had an affair with a member of Mendorra's royal family. Charles is replaced as ambassador by Dorian herself. Later, Charles eloped with businesswoman Lee Halpern during a drunken night in Las Vegas, and died of a heart attack on their wedding night in 1987.

== Elizabeth Sanders ==
Elizabeth Sanders
- One Life to Live character
- Portrayed by: Lois Kibbee
- Duration: 1986–89
- First appearance: December 1986
- Last appearance: September 21, 1989
- Created by: Peggy O'Shea
- Introduced by: Paul Rauch
In-universe information
- Occupation: Owner and CEO of Sanders Enterprises
- Children: Charles Sanders
- Grandchildren: Kate Sanders; Jamie Sanders; Geoff McGrath

Elizabeth Sanders is a fictional character on the ABC Daytime soap opera One Life to Live. The role was played by actress Lois Kibbee from December 1986 through September 1988, returning briefly on April 13, 1989, and later from July 10 to 1989. Elizabeth was a powerful business woman who ran Sanders Chemicals. She disapproved of son Charles' marriage to the Jewish Judith Sanders and initially objected to the romance of granddaughter Kate and Cord Roberts. When Charles and Judith divorced, Elizabeth tried to pair him with Dorian who later took over Charles' former position as ambassador to Mendora. She was aghast when he took up with former hooker Lee Halpern and married her right before he died of a heart attack. Elizabeth vowed revenge on the Buchanan family after Cord broke up with Kate to return to Tina and Asa took control of Sanders Chemicals. She was imprisoned after scheming to destroy the Buchanans through kidnapping and murder. The following spring, she was visited in prison by an information-seeking Clint. Later that summer, she escaped from prison with the help of her grandson Jamie. After they were captured, Elizabeth was brought to see Asa thanks to Bo's insistence that he see her, but Asa refused to accept her apologies for crimes against his family. Elizabeth was freed thanks to Bo's testimony on her behalf as to preventing Jamie and his co-hort Ursula Blackwell from electrocuting Tina and left town after revealing that she had a terminal illness.

== Jamie Sanders ==
Jamie Sanders
- One Life to Live character
- Portrayed by: Mark Philpot
- Duration: 1986–89
- First appearance: December 1986
- Last appearance: August 28, 1989
- Created by: Peggy O'Shea
- Introduced by: Paul Rauch
In-universe information
- Occupation: Crack manufacturer
- Parents: Charles Sanders; Judith Russell
- Siblings: Kate Sanders; Geoff McGrath
- Grandparents: Elizabeth Sanders
- Aunts and uncles: Jon Russell

Jamie Sanders is a fictional character on the ABC Daytime soap opera One Life to Live. The role appeared and was played by actor Mark Philpot from December 1986 until 1989.

=== Character history ===
Jamie is introduced as the mean-spirited foil of a brother to gentle Kate Sanders in December 1986. He plays on his mother Judith's sympathies to bail him out of one dilemma after another. Eventually, Jamie's criminal behaviour (including running a crack cocaine factory with drug lord Dante Medina, killing a fellow cocaine dealer, and kidnapping Cassie Callison) caught up with him and he was sent to Statesville Prison for a life sentence. Even in jail, he was a menace: he threatened Tina when she was wrongly imprisoned for the murder of Maria Roberts, broke out and shot Clint Buchanan, and led a widescale prison break with paternal grandmother Elizabeth when last seen in 1989.

== Kate Sanders ==
Kate Sanders
- One Life to Live character
- Portrayed by: Marcia Cross
- Duration: 1986–88
- First appearance: October 20, 1986
- Last appearance: January 1988
- Created by: Peggy O'Shea
- Introduced by: Paul Rauch
In-universe information
- Occupation: Anthropologist
- Parents: Charles Sanders; Judith Russell
- Siblings: Jamie Sanders; Geoff McGrath
- Spouse: Cord Roberts (invalid; 1987)
- Grandparents: Elizabeth Sanders
- Aunts and uncles: Jon Russell

Kathryn "Kate" Sanders is a fictional character on the ABC Daytime soap opera One Life to Live. The role appeared and was played by Marcia Cross from December 1986 through January 1988.

=== Character history ===
Kate is an anthropologist with a taste for adventure when introduced in December 1986, falling in love with Cord Roberts (then married to Tina Lord). When Tina was believed to be dead, Kate accepted Cord's proposal. But just as their wedding ceremony was coming to an end, Tina abruptly burst into the chapel — very much alive and carrying a baby she claimed to be Cord's son (who was actually the son of Gabrielle Medina and Max Holden). While Cord sought a divorce from Tina, Kate became entangled with Patrick London, her ex-fiancé, who stooped to insane measures to break up Cord and Kate. He did not need to bother though; as Kate came to realize Cord loved Tina, she broke up with him and left Llanview.

== Pamela Stuart ==
Pamela Stuart
- One Life to Live character
- Portrayed by: Christine Jones
- Duration: 1985–88; 2001; 2008–09
- First appearance: November 1985
- Last appearance: October 19, 2009
- Created by: Peggy O'Shea
- Introduced by: Paul Rauch (1985); Gary Tomlin (2001); Frank Valentini (2008)
In-universe information
- Father: Cameron Oliver
- Siblings: Harlan Oliver
- Spouse: Asa Buchanan (1986–87); Pete O'Neill (1987–2009)

Pamela Reed Stuart Buchanan O'Neill (Note: Christine Jones was mistakenly credited as "Pamela Stewart" onscreen on January 18 and January 25, 2008.) is a fictional character from the ABC Daytime soap opera One Life to Live. Christine Jones portrayed the character, first from 1986 to 1987, then in 1988, October 2001, January 18 – 21, 2008, April 9–10, 2008, June 3, 2008 and October 19, 2009. Pamela is one of Asa Buchanan's many ex-wives.

In 1985, Tina Lord discovers that Asa has been leading a double life for years; on the tropical island of Malakeva, he is known as Jeb Stuart, and has been married to a kindly woman named Pamela for a decade. Tina tells Pamela that her husband is not a sea captain, as she believes, but actually a millionaire with a family in Llanview. Noting that Asa and Pamela's marriage is not legal, Tina convinces Pamela to pretend she is dying to manipulate Asa into marrying her for real. He does on January 20, 1986, and Pamela springs from her "deathbed" and confronts him. Arriving in Llanview to live as Mrs. Asa Buchanan, Pamela is at first a thorn in his side. As Asa realizes he wants her to be his wife, she demands a divorce — and half of his fortune. Their marriage ends in 1987; Pamela marries lawyer Pete O'Neill, and they leave town that year to return to Malakeva. The following year, Pamela comes back for the funeral of Pete's niece, Didi. After her divorce from Asa, Pamela owned the Palace Hotel (when it was the Vernon Inn) before she sold it to Max Holden and Lee Halpern.

Asa fakes his death in 2001, framing his wife Gabrielle Medina and her lover Max Holden; Pamela and all of Asa's other living ex-wives appear for the funeral. Ex-wife Alex Olanov finds Asa in hiding on his private island, St. Blaze's, and he is ultimately dragged back to Llanview.

Pamela returns to Llanview on January 18, 2008, at the invitation of Asa's son Bo Buchanan, and attends the Buchanan Enterprises board meeting to weigh in on the possibility that Jared Banks is the illegitimate son of Asa, who had died on August 16, 2007. Bo had determined that Asa had been with Pamela around the time of Jared's conception; Pamela confirms that Asa had never met Jared's mother Valerie Banks. To the shock of everyone assembled, Pamela reveals that Valerie had in fact been her sister; Pamela then drops the bombshell that she is actually Jared's biological mother. Afraid of losing Asa's love by bringing a child into the relationship, Pamela had asked Valerie to secretly adopt Asa's son. Pamela declares him the Buchanan heir; after the board meeting lets out, however, Pamela returns to meet with Jared alone. It is revealed that Pamela has lied to the Buchanans and is merely going along with Jared's scheme; Pamela is not really Jared's mother. Jared had not been aware that Pamela was going to appear at the meeting or lie for him, but Pamela explains that it was the least she could do "after everything my brother" — a violent abuser named Harlan Oliver who dated Jared's mother after Charlie left the Banks household — "did to you and your family." (Note: The February 1, 2008 episode included a flashback that reveals that Jared and Valerie had been abused by some of her boyfriends after Charlie had left the Banks household, and in the February 15, 2008 episode Jared confirms that one of the abusers had been Pamela's brother.) Pamela wishes Jared good luck with the company.

Pamela is summoned back to Llanview by Natalie Buchanan on April 9, 2008; Jared has admitted his true identity to Natalie, who wants to know why Pamela lied to the Buchanans. Pamela relates Jared's troubled childhood, and explains that she had only wanted to help him. Pamela appears again on June 3, 2008, making a surprise appearance at the Buchanan Enterprises shareholders' meeting. Reluctant and saddened, she confirms Dorian Lord's reveal that Jared is not really Asa's son. On October 19, 2009, Natalie and John McBain find Pamela's corpse at the Buchanan cabin.

== Courtney Wright ==
Courtney Wright
- One Life to Live character
- Portrayed by: Phylicia Ayers-Allen
- Duration: 1983–84
- First appearance: 1983
- Last appearance: 1984
- Created by: Jean Arley
- Introduced by: Joseph Stuart
In-universe information
- Occupation: Publicist for Buchanan Enterprises

Courtney Wright is a fictional character on the ABC Daytime serial One Life to Live. The role was played by actress Phylicia Rashād (credited as "Phylicia Ayers") from 1983 until 1984, when she left the series to accept the role of Claire Huxtable on the NBC sitcom The Cosby Show.
