= Carlo Hesser =

- One Life to Live character
- Portrayed by: Thom Christopher
- Duration: 1990–1992, 1996–1997, 2005, 2008
- First appearance: January 11, 1990
- Last appearance: September 11, 2008
- Created by: S. Michael Schnessel
- Introduced by: Paul Rauch
In-universe information
- Other names: Carl Franklin Bern; Mortimer Henry Bern; Poseidon
- Occupation: Mob Boss; Head of an International crime syndicate
- Family: Bern/Hesser
- Parents: Stephan Bern; Wilma Bern
- Siblings: Mortimer Bern; Joseph Hobart (adoptive)
- Spouse: Alex Olanov (1992–1996)
- Children: Johnny Dee Hesser; Charlotte Hesser; Talia Sahid
- Stepchildren: Cutter Wentworth; Kimberly Andrews
- Nieces: Stephanie Hobart (adoptive)

Carlo Hesser is a fictional character from the ABC daytime soap opera One Life to Live. The role was portrayed by Thom Christopher intermittently between 1990 and 2008.

== Storylines ==
=== 1990–92 ===
Upstate Pennsylvania mob boss Carlo arrives in Llanview, Pennsylvania in 1990 and sets up a drug-trafficking operation, but soon mayor and wealthy newspaper publisher Victoria Lord Buchanan steps in and shuts him down. Carlo's son and heir, Johnny Dee Hesser, seeks to aid his father and hires thugs to scare Viki off, but instead Viki ends up incapacitated by a stroke.

Meanwhile, Johnny has been romantically involved with Viki's half-sister Tina Lord, and soon a pregnant Tina is unsure whether the father of her baby is Johnny or her ex-husband Cord Roberts. Finding out about the baby and Tina's plans to reconcile with Cord, a distraught Johnny bursts into Llanfair, knocking Tina unconscious and attempting to kidnap her. Viki, unable to walk or speak, realizes that Tina's life is in danger; her long-dormant alternate personality Niki Smith emerges. As Niki, Viki is able to stand – and shoots Johnny to death. Initially, both Viki and Tina have no memory of what happened, and Tina becomes the prime suspect in the murder. However, an audio tape recorded in the room later exonerates her, and proves that Viki had acted in self-defense.

The baby is proven to be Cord's; Carlo, however, vows revenge against the entire Buchanan family. He kidnaps Viki's daughter Megan Gordon and Megan's half-sister Sarah; eventually the sisters manage to escape, but Carlo kidnaps Sarah again. Sarah's husband Bo Buchanan (also Viki's brother-in-law) hires former federal agent Alex Olanov to help him track down Sarah. Megan's boyfriend Jake Harrison feigns a romantic interest in Carlo's daughter Charlotte Hesser in order to discover Sarah's whereabouts; Charlotte soon claims that Carlo has put out a contract on Megan's life, but will be saved if Jake marries Charlotte. He does, but Charlotte eventually grants him a divorce so he can be with Megan. Alex eventually finds Sarah; Carlo agrees to let her go in exchange for his freedom, but Sarah's plane crashes and she is presumed dead. Sarah later returns and reveals that she has been Carlo's prisoner the entire time.

In 1991 Carlo blackmails Gabrielle Medina to aid him in his plot to poison Viki; Gabrielle backs out and testifies against Carlo. She accepts the blame and goes to jail for seven years to protect her young son Al Holden from Carlo's wrath. The Buchanans turn to Alex – now in jail for trying to kill Bo's new love Cassie Callison – for help. With the promise that she will be released, Alex uses her government connections to uncover evidence of Hesser killing an undercover federal informant. Alex secretly makes a deal with Carlo; she will destroy the evidence if he marries her. He does, and Alex keeps her word. Patriarch Asa Buchanan discovers old love letters to his wife Renee from Carlo; she and Carlo had been together years before, when they both had lived in Las Vegas. A furious Asa files for divorce and threatens Carlo publicly. Carlo is soon found dead, with Asa and Sarah among the many suspects. It is ultimately revealed that Carlo's own niece Stephanie Hobart had killed him after discovering that he had murdered her father, Carlo's adopted brother Joseph Hobart. Out of loyalty to Carlo, Alex sneaks Stephanie out of town to avoid prosecution.

Alex struggles in vain to retain control of Carlo's mob empire, and finally finds a Carlo lookalike – Egyptologist Mortimer Bern – to take her dead husband's place. Alex manages to eventually transform the meek Mortimer into a believable Carlo, but Mortimer soon falls for Renee Buchanan and becomes increasingly uncontrollable. Mortimer's mother, Wilma Bern, arrives to find her son. Alex bribes Wilma to keep her plan in motion, but the police discover that "Carlo" is alive and intend to hunt him down. To save Mortimer, Wilma reveals that he and Carlo are twins; unable to care for two children, she had given up Carlo. Mortimer and Wilma soon leave town.

=== 1996–97 ===
In 1996, Alex – now married to Asa – discovers that her husband's mysterious business partner "Poseidon" is actually Carlo. Carlo admits to faking his death at Stephanie's hands, and spending the previous four years building up his now-international crime syndicate by selling arms to the terrorist group known as "the Men of 21." Carlo swindles Asa out of $30 million and secretly reunites with Alex, nearly killing Asa in an explosion. Carlo reintroduces himself to Llanview as "reformed," the statute of limitations having run out on all of his previous crimes. But Carlo soon resumes his vendetta against the Buchanans and their loved ones, enlisting local criminal R.J. Gannon in his plot. Former gang leader and ex-con Antonio Vega leaves prison determined to rebuild his life in an honest way; Carlo sees him as a worthy successor, but Antonio only accepts Carlo's help when economic hardship forces him to do so. Carlo manages to drive Asa's company to near-bankruptcy and hires a hypnotherapist in a failed attempt to program Viki to kill her own son Kevin Buchanan. Alex leaves Asa and pretends she is pregnant to coerce Carlo into marrying her; Asa reveals the truth to Carlo, who dumps Alex. Carlo is again found murdered, the list of suspects also including Max Holden and Viki and Tina's brother Todd Manning, both of whom Carlo had almost killed. Antonio is nearly convicted when Mortimer appears and testifies that Alex had killed Carlo as revenge for leaving her. Mortimer soon disappears with Asa's $30 million; months later, he returns and lures Alex out of town with him. When Alex returns to Llanview in 2001, she confirms that "Mortimer" had been Carlo in disguise, but he had since left her and vanished with the money.

=== 2005 ===
Fleeing a kidnapping charge for having ex-wife Blair Cramer abducted and thrown into a mental institution, Asa tracks down Carlo in Argentina in 2005. Asa makes Carlo a deal: he can keep Asa's millions uncontested if he kills Blair for Asa. Carlo accepts and returns to Llanview, disguising himself as a police officer and nearly murdering Blair. Blair's ex-husband Todd manages to save her, and Carlo is sent to prison. He stages a massive prison break in November 2005, but ultimately remains incarcerated.

=== 2008 ===
On June 26, 2008, Llanview police officer (and Antonio's girlfriend) Talia Sahid inexplicably aids Jonas Chamberlain, the sinister U.S. Ambassador to the European principality of Mendorra, in kidnapping her roommate Sarah Roberts (Cristian's girlfriend). Soon Antonio and Cristian discover that Jonas has both women; they and Sarah's mother Tina Lord – who had been posing as the Crown Princess of Mendorra – agree to accompany Jonas back to Mendorra in order to make an exchange: Sarah and Talia for the Crown Jewels which Tina has in her possession.

In Mendorra, Carlo is revealed to be Talia's estranged father, and the real mastermind behind the kidnappings (corrupt Llanview Police Commissioner Lee Ramsey had effected Carlo's disappearance from prison). Talia is Carlo's youngest child; during her early childhood, she had lived under Carlo's tyrannical rule, tormented by her demented siblings, Johnny Dee and Charlotte. Eventually, Talia had escaped from Carlo with her mother. Taking her Syrian stepfather's last name "Sahid," Talia had eventually gone into law enforcement for the express purpose of repudiating all the evil done by Carlo, and in the hopes of eventually bringing the father she despises to justice. Carlo intends to force Talia to marry Jonas, the true heir to the throne and Carlo's puppet. Talia protests and stalls, but goes through with the royal wedding on July 31, 2008 to save Antonio and her friends from harm. Talia brokers a deal with Carlo: she will stay if the others are allowed to leave. With several people's lives at stake, a furious Antonio is forced to leave Talia behind. Antonio, Sarah and Cristian later return; they drug Carlo and Jonas and stage them in bed together, and Talia leads a team of reporters to "discover" the scene. With a protesting Carlo and Jonas arrested for fraud, Talia and the others leave Mendorra. Cristian is kidnapped from an airport the group is connecting through; he awakens to find himself a prisoner on a cargo ship, with Carlo there gloating. Posing as "Mortimer Bern," Carlo delivers Cristian to Plato prison in Colombia, passing him off to the authorities as "the worst criminal in all of Colombia." Carlo then disappears.
