= Max Holden (One Life to Live) =

- One Life to Live character
- James DePaiva as Max Holden
- Portrayed by: James DePaiva (1987–90, 1991–2003, 2007); Nicholas Walker (1990–91)
- Duration: 1987–2003, 2007
- First appearance: January 6, 1987
- Last appearance: August 20, 2007
- Created by: Peggy O'Shea
- Introduced by: Paul Rauch; Frank Valentini (2007)
In-universe information
- Other names: Matthew Kingston; Max Buchanan
- Occupation: Owner and manager of Break Bar; Owner of Max's Place; Owner of Palace Hotel and Serenity Springs
- Parents: Wingate Holden; Patricia Holden
- Brothers: Steve Holden
- Half-sisters: Andy Harrison
- Wife: Gabrielle Medina (1990–91); Luna Moody (1993–95); Blair Cramer (1999–2001); Roxy Balsom (2002–03)
- Children: Al Holden; Frankie Holden; Leslie Holden
- Nephews: Steven Holden, Jr.

Max Holden is a fictional character from the American soap opera One Life to Live. The role was originated by James DePaiva.

== Casting ==
James DePaiva originated the role of Max Holden on the series episode first-run January 6, 1987. He departed the role in February 23, 1990. The character was then recast with Nicholas Walker in a plastic surgery storyline (see "Larry Wolek") on March 5 of that year. Walker departed on September 16, 1991, while DePaiva returned to the series on October 25, 1991, with no mention made of the character's return to his previous appearance, portraying Max through the character's departure on October 27, 2003. He briefly returned from August 17 through August 20, 2007, for the on-screen funeral of lead character Asa Buchanan (Philip Carey). In 2017, DePaiva told Soap Opera Digest called Max a "great role" that really put him "on the map". Whilst on the soap, DePaiva met Kassie DePaiva, who would later become his wife.

== Storylines ==
Max Holden arrives to Llanview in 1987 to seek a loan from fellow Texan and family friend Maria Roberts (BarBara Luna), who agreed to give him the money he needed on the condition that Max lure Tina Lord (Andrea Evans) away from her son, Cord (John Loprieno). Max soon falls for Tina, while she is still in love with Cord. When Max and Tina are marrying in ceremony, she accidentally says Cord's name during her vows, and Max calls off his relationship with her. Max's brother Steve Holden (Russ Anderson) comes to town in 1987 and soon becomes involved with and marries Gabrielle Medina (Fiona Hutchison), Max's ex-girlfriend and mother to his son, Al. Gabrielle still cares for Max, however, and the relationship with Steve falls apart in 1988. Steve dies later that year.

Max falls in love in 1991 with Luna Moody (Susan Batten). Luna later gives birth to their twins, Thomas and Leslie Diana. During his marriage, Max engages in an affair in 1993 and 1994 with Blair Cramer (Kassie DePaiva), who had previously married Asa in a marriage of convenience. Max is widowed when Luna is killed in 1995. Max goes on to enjoy relationships with Maggie Carpenter (Crystal Chappell), as well as a reunion and marriage with Blair and a fling with Kelly Cramer (Gina Tognoni). He also reunites with Gabrielle, but it does not last. From 1999 to 2001, he pretends to be the son of Asa and Renée Divine (Patricia Elliott) before being exposed by Todd Manning (Roger Howarth). In 2002, in a drunken Las Vegas escapade, he awakes to find himself married to Roxy Balsom (Ilene Kristen), a union that quickly fizzles.

When Al dies of liver failure in the fall of 2003, at the advice of Luna's spirit, Max leaves Llanview to be with his and Luna's twins, Frank and Leslie, in North Carolina. Max returns in August 2007 for the funeral of Asa and reveals that he, Frank, and Leslie are all living in Gabrielle's home country of Argentina. He invites Blair to join him there and kisses her, but Blair gently rebuffs him. Wishing his best to Blair, Max returns to Argentina.

== Reception ==
Charlie Mason from Soaps She Knows placed Max on his list of soap opera recasts that should not have happened, commenting that "Nicholas Walker, best known for playing Trey Clegg on Capitol, is so talented that we would've thought he could play any part. But when he was tapped to replace James DePaiva as Llanview's foremost playboy in 1990, we were reminded that nope, some roles can only be played by one actor — in this case, DePaiva, who was enticed to return in '91."
