= Kevin Buchanan =

- One Life to Live character
- Dan Gauthier as Kevin Buchanan
- Portrayed by: Morgan K. Melis (1976–1981); Chris Cunningham (1981–1982); Jonathan Brandis (1982–1983); Ryan Janis (1983–1990); Mathew Vipond (1990–1991); Joey Thrower (1991–1992); Kirk Geiger (1992–1994); Jack Armstrong (1994–1995); Ken Kenitzer (1995); Kevin Stapleton (1996–1998); Timothy Gibbs (1998–2001); Dan Gauthier (2003–2010)
- Duration: 1976–2001; 2003–2007; 2009–2010
- First appearance: September 12, 1976
- Last appearance: November 24, 2010
- Created by: Gordon Russell
- Introduced by: Doris Quinlan (1976); Frank Valentini (2003)
- Crossover appearances: All My Children
In-universe information
- Other names: Kevin Lord Riley (birth name)
- Occupation: Businessman; Politician; Journalist
- Family: Lord; Riley; Buchanan (adoptive)
- Father: Joe Riley
- Mother: Victoria Lord
- Adoptive father: Clint Buchanan
- Brothers: Joey Buchanan
- Half-brothers: Cord Roberts (adoptive); Rex Balsom (adoptive)
- Half-sisters: Megan Gordon; Megan Craig Riley; Natalie Buchanan; Jessica Buchanan
- Spouse: LeeAnn Demerest (1992–93); Cassie Callison (1998–99); Kelly Cramer (2001–04)
- Children: Duke Buchanan; Kevin Buchanan, Jr. (stillborn)
- Grandchildren: Zane Buchanan
- Grandparents: Victor Lord; Eugenia Randolph Lord; Asa Buchanan (adoptive); Olympia Buchanan (adoptive)
- Aunts and uncles: Eileen Riley Siegel; Tom Dennison; Tony Lord; Meredith Lord; Tina Lord; Todd Manning; Victor Lord, Jr.; Bo Buchanan (adoptive); Ben Davidson (adoptive)
- Nieces and nephews: Megan Buchanan; Chloe Brennan; Bree Brennan; Ryder Ford; Liam McBain; C. J. Roberts (adoptive); Sarah Roberts (adoptive); Shane Balsom (adoptive)
- First cousins: Julie Siegel; Tim Siegel; Mari Lynn Dennison; Brian Kendall; Daniel Wolek; C. J. Roberts; Sarah Roberts; Starr Manning; Jack Manning; Danielle Manning; Sam Manning; David Vickers Buchanan (adoptive); Drew Buchanan (adoptive); Matthew Buchanan (adoptive)

Kevin Buchanan (born Kevin Lord Riley) is a fictional character from the American soap opera One Life to Live. The character is the first child born to original lead protagonists Victoria Lord and Joe Riley.

== Casting ==
The character of Kevin Buchanan was originated by child actor Morgan K. Melis from 1976 until 1982. In 1982, the role was recast twice; first with Chris Cunningham and then again with Jonathan Brandis. The role was recast a fourth time in 1983 with actor Ryan Janis until the actor's exit on August 10, 1990. That same year, Matthew Vipond was placed into the role, airing from September 18, 1990 until January 8, 1991; the role was later recast with actor Joey Thrower from February 13, 1991. In 1992, Thrower was replaced by Kirk Geiger, first airing on June 16, 1992. Geiger stayed with the soap until October 17, 1994. Jack Armstrong succeeded Geiger on November 8, 1994 until his exit a year later on June 29, 1995. Armstrong was replaced by Ken Kenitzer, who played the role for a very short period from July 3 to August 8, 1995.

On March 1, 1996, the role was recast again, this time with actor Kevin Stapleton. Stapleton remained with the serial until April 13, 1998, when he was replaced by actor Timothy Gibbs, who first aired on April 16, 1998. Gibbs was nominated for a Daytime Emmy Award for Outstanding Supporting Actor in 2000; he remained with the soap until March 2001. Gibbs last aired on March 15, 2001. In 2003, it was ABC announced that actor Dan Gauthier would become the next actor to portray the role. Gauthier debuted in the role on June 27, 2003. In August 2006, it was announced that Gauthier had been cut from his role as Kevin Buchanan, with reports that "the network-hired focus groups [did] not have an overall favorable opinion of the character of Kevin." Gauthier returned to the series for guest appearances in August 2007 for the series' 9,999 and 10,000 episodes,

Gauthier continued to make several guest appearances; the first of which happened between October and November 2009. He made his final guest appearances in March, May and November 2010.

In 2007, Gauthier was nominated for a Daytime Emmy Award in the category of Outstanding Supporting Actor for his portrayal of a livid Kevin in confrontation with wife Kelly (Heather Tom) at the revelation of her romantic bonding with his son Duke Buchanan.

== Storylines ==
Kevin is born on-screen September 12, 1976, to Joe and Victoria "Viki" Lord Riley, but he is soon kidnapped by his uncle Tony's wife, Cathy Craig. Cathy loses touch with reality after the death of her and Joe's daughter Megan, who had been killed in an accident for which Cathy blamed Viki. When delusional Cathy is found, she has no memory of taking the infant Kevin or where she had left him. By 1977, the loss of their son had taken its toll on Joe and Viki's marriage, but when Cathy finally remembers enough for Kevin to be found, Joe and Viki reconcile.

Joe died of a brain tumor right before Kevin's brother, Joseph Francis Riley Jr., is born on-screen in January 1980. When Viki later marries Clint Buchanan in 1982, Clint adopts Kevin and Joey.

In 1991, teenaged Kevin's first real love is Stephanie Hobart, the niece of Carlo Hesser; Carlo ends the relationship because of his hatred for the Buchanans. Kevin then begins a romantic relationship with LeeAnn Demerest, but LeeAnn and Max Holden are also drawn to one another. When LeeAnn believes that Max has fallen for Luna Moody, she sleeps with Kevin and becomes pregnant. Kevin finds out in 1992, and they elope. Meanwhile, blackmailing DuAnn is murdered, and Julia Medina ultimately confesses to the crime. Kevin and LeeAnn's marriage crumbles over her closeness with Jason Webb; they divorce, and LeeAnn leaves town for Texas with their son Duke in 1993.

Kevin grows close to Rachel Gannon, whose father Hank does not like their friendship at all. Kevin is charged with participating in the gang rape of fellow student Marty Saybrooke with soon-to-be-uncovered uncle Todd Manning but is eventually exonerated. Later in 1994, Rachel and Kevin are set to move in together, but, while Kevin is in Texas visiting his son, Rachel becomes romantically involved with Dr. Ben Price. Kevin ends his friendship with Rachel.

Kevin opts to pursue a career in journalism like his parents, and in 1994 begins dating Andy Harrison, half-sister of both Max Holden and Jake Harrison. Kevin goes to London on assignment in 1995 and ends their relationship in a letter.

Kevin comes back to Llanview in 1996, and becomes an investigative reporter. At his mother's Banner newspaper is where he meets rival reporter Cassie Carpenter. Cassie was married, but that does not matter to Kevin, who wants a romance with her from the start of their meeting. Cassie resists his advances and tells him not to interfere in her marriage. He soon does with Téa Delgado. The sight of Téa with Kevin leads to Cassie's jealousy, and in 1997, Cassie cuckolds on her husband, Reverend Andrew Carpenter. Cassie and Andrew soon divorce, and Cassie marries Kevin.

Later in 1998, Kevin and Cassie hire a nurse named Barbara Graham. She is supposedly hired to care for Cassie's father, David Renaldi, who is sick with ALS. Barbara soon falls in love with Kevin after a tryst when the two were together in the basement cellar of the Buchanan lodge. The tryst causes Kevin great guilt, but he does not reveal the incident to wife Cassie. Cassie finds out about it, and she is livid. Barbara, jealous of Kevin and Cassie's marriage, tries to kill Cassie by shooting her but accidentally shoots and kills Kevin's cousin, Drew. Cassie is incidentally shot, resulting in temporary paralysis and insanity, as mental problems are common in her family. Cassie retaliates by holding Barbara hostage, but Kevin finds Cassie before any further injury is sustained. Cassie is shipped off to Switzerland, and their marriage is annulled.

In 1999, a woman named Grace Monroe arrives in town, eventually falling in love with Kevin. But when Rae Cummings arrives in Llanview, it is revealed to the town that Grace had carried on an affair with Rae's then-husband, causing Rae to attempt to ruin Grace's life in revenge. Rae is unsuccessful in convincing Kevin to stop seeing Grace. Kevin and Grace grow closer as journalists and companions covering a court case involving Lindsay Rappaport, eventually becoming engaged to marry.

In October 1999, Kevin is distraught when Grace drowns at her adoptive grandfather, Asa Buchanan's summer house. Having trouble coping, Kevin begins drinking heavily. His brother Joey and Joey's girlfriend Kelly Cramer move in with Kevin to help him cope. On New Year's Eve 1999, Kevin and Kelly drink so heavily that they nearly end up having sex. They both agree to keep the romantic incident a secret from Joey. When Kevin learns of mother Viki's diagnosis with breast cancer, he rebuffs Kelly's continued advances.

Now married to Kelly, Kevin falls in love with her cousin, Blair Cramer. Kevin tells Blair that he is growing distant with Kelly because she had an affair in Texas. As the months go on, Kevin gets closer with Blair, eventually asking Kelly for a divorce. Kelly is desperate to hold on to the marriage, hoping a pregnancy will keep them together. When the pregnancy occurs, Kevin breaks things off with Blaire and returns to Kelly, despite a one night stand with Blair. Months later, Kevin is overjoyed when Kelly presents him with their apparent son.

After their child's birth, Kelly and Kevin soon begin a messy divorce proceeding and custody battle, made all the worse when Kevin's son, Duke, arrives in Llanview in 2004 and sides with Kelly in the separation. Kevin wins custody of their son, but when Kelly divulges the child's true paternity, her hidden miscarriage of their child, and desire to return the child to his birth mother, Kevin becomes determined to keep “Ace”. Kelly eventually convinces Kevin to hand the boy over to his rightful parents, who rename him Adam “AJ” Chandler III. Afterwards, the two end divorce proceedings and reconcile. Kevin is happy as him and Duke begin to bond. Kevin and Kelly are looking forward to their future together when Kevin becomes ill. The illness leaves Kevin sterile.

Kevin and Kelly find themselves getting into arguments and eventually break up. On the day of the wedding of Michael McBain to Marcie Walsh, Kevin and Kelly have a severe argument at St. James Rectory and Kevin walks out on Kelly, leaving her weeping. Kevin learns Duke had comforted Kelly after their blowout, leading them to have sex before a freak tornado led to their being buried alive. When both Kelly and Duke are wheeled in needing surgery for severe injuries, a lack of available surgeons forces the next of kin of both Kelly and Duke, Kevin, to choose which one will be operated on first. Since Kelly had ostensibly suffered worse injuries than Duke, Kevin chooses her and is soon devastated when Duke dies before the operation. Kevin initially blames Kelly for Duke's death but grows more distraught when he learns that Kelly is pregnant with Duke's son and his grandson. Kevin eventually comes to terms with Kelly's pregnancy and is present when she goes into early labor. After the birth of her son, Zane Buchanan, Kevin asks Kelly to come to London with him and allow him to raise his grandson with her.

Kevin returns on August 16 and August 17, 2007, to attend the funeral of his adopted grandfather, Asa. Kevin welcomes his cousin Matthew Buchanan to London when Matthew's parents Bo and Nora take him there to attend boarding school. On March 2, 2010, Kevin appears on Dorian Lord's doorstep to console Kelly about the death of her mother and Dorian's sister, Melinda, and to propose to Kelly. Kelly declines and Kevin goes back to London.
