= Laura Bonarrigo =

American actress

- Occupation: Actress
- Spouse: Divorced
- Children: 2
- Website: laurabonarrigo.com

Laura Bonarrigo is an American actress.

== Early life ==
Laura Bonarrigo became a member of The Shoestring Players, a professional children’s theater group, while still in grade school. While in high school, her family moved from Massachusetts to a large farm in Thomaston, Maine. She became involved in community theater and in 1981, decided to compete in the Miss Maine National Teenager Pageant. The first year she competed, she came in second and won the congeniality award. She ran again in 1982 and won the overall title in addition to winning the awards for most photogenic, citizenship and again, congeniality. She competed in the Miss National Teenagers Pageant in 1982.

In 1986, she graduated from the Mason Gross School of the Arts at Rutgers University, after studying acting, voice and movement. She returned to Maine to continue her acting studies at both the International Film and Television Workshops in Rockport, Maine and the School for Performance Studies. She moved to New York and after doing some modeling, she got an early acting role as the Mother in the independent film The Passing with Marian Seldes and Garrison Keillor.

== Career ==
Bonarrigo is best known for her role as the fourth Cassie Callison on the ABC soap opera One Life to Live. Before landing the role of Cassie, Bonarrigo played the short-term role of Lindsay on the NBC soap opera Another World in 1991.

On One Life to Live, she succeeded Ava Haddad, who portrayed Cassie from 1983–1986, with a brief reprise in 1990. Bonarrigo portrayed the role from April 17, 1991 to January 1999, winning a Soap Opera Digest Award nomination in 1993 for Outstanding Younger Leading Actress. She left the show in 1999 when she was controversially fired while on maternity leave, something that was widely blamed on then-executive producer Jill Farren Phelps. She made several brief appearances on the series in 2001, 2002, 2003, and 2004. She returned once again on February 15, 18 and 26 and March 1 of 2010, when Cassie's family was being terrorized. After leaving One Life to Live in 1999 and giving birth to her son, Laura performed as Trish in Five Women Wearing the Same Dress by Alan Ball. Her daughter was born in 2001 at which time she took a break from acting to raise her children in Manhattan.

She portrayed the title role in an off-Broadway play by Myra Bairstow entitled The Rise of Dorothy Hale from June 2007 to January 2008. On October 28, 2008 Bonarrigo returned to daytime television in the role of Rebecca Fowler on ABC's All My Children.

She returned full-time to acting & modeling, playing Angie in the independent film Concerto, which was a Sundance 2009 Selection and Winner of the Hollywood Foreign Press Association Award. She also starred as Kitty in the staged reading of Otherwise by Vincent Crapelli, with Karen Ziemba and Beth Leavel.

In 2009, from June 17 to July 26, she portrayed the role of Elly in a production of Dance of the Seven Headed Mouse at the historic Beckett Theater in New York. John Simon of Bloomberg News, said of her; "Outstanding is the Elly of Laura Bonarrigo, hitherto a model and TV actress; beautiful and talented, she deserves a rich theatrical career."

From 2015 - today, Bonarrigo has established herself as a certified life coach and certified divorce coach. She holds certifications from the International Coach Federation (ACC), the Life Purpose Institute, and is a CDC Certified Divorce Coach©. Her coaching practice focuses on supporting individuals through divorce, personal transitions, and creative challenges.

== Personal life ==
She was married to Marty Koffman from 1995-2013 and the couple have two children. She reverted to using her maiden name professionally in 2013.

From 2006-2009 she started and ran Feed Your Mouths helping other moms feed their children healthy nourishing meals & snacks. Since then, she has worked closely with families & individuals interested in changing the way they shop, cook and eat in their own homes.

She is a member of the historic acting club The Players.
