= Cord Roberts =

- One Life to Live character
- Portrayed by: John Loprieno
- Duration: 1986–1997, 2004, 2007–2008, 2011
- First appearance: May 16, 1986
- Last appearance: November 15, 2011
- Created by: Peggy O'Shea
- Introduced by: Paul Rauch (1986); Frank Valentini (2004)
In-universe information
- Other names: Cordero Roberts; Cord Buchanan
- Occupation: Executive at Buchanan Enterprises; Owner of Norscott Drilling Company; Former CEO of Buchanan Enterprises; Former Photographer for The Banner
- Family: Buchanan
- Parents: Clint Buchanan; Maria Vasquez Roberts
- Stepfather: Al Roberts
- Stepmother: Victoria Lord (1986–94, 2013–); Lindsay Rappaport (1998–99); Nora Hanen (2009–10); Kimberly Andrews (2010)
- Siblings: Kevin Buchanan (adoptive); Joey Buchanan (adoptive); Jessica Buchanan; Natalie Buchanan; Rex Balsom
- Wife: Tina Lord (1986–87, 1988–90, 1991–93, 2011–); Kate Sanders (invalid; 1987)
- Children: C. J. Roberts; Sarah Roberts
- Grandparents: Asa Buchanan; Olympia Buchanan; Rosa Vasquez
- Uncles: Bo Buchanan; Ben Davidson; George Vasquez
- Nieces and nephews: Duke Buchanan; Bree Brennan; Shane Balsom; Liam McBain; Ryder Ford; Kevin Buchanan, Jr. Megan Buchanan; Bree Brennan; Chloe Brennan
- First cousins: Drew Buchanan; Matthew Buchanan; David Vickers

Cord Roberts is a fictional character from the ABC soap opera One Life to Live. The role was originated in May 1986 by John Loprieno, who left the series in 1992 and then returned from January 28, 1993 through 1997. The character made brief appearances in 2004, 2007, and 2008. Loprieno reprised the role opposite former longtime costar Andrea Evans September 27, 2011, last appearing in the role November 15, 2011.

== Storylines ==
=== Cord and Tina ===
Cord and Tina (Andrea Evans) marry, 1986

In 1986, social climber Tina Lord intercepts a letter to her brother-in-law Clint Buchanan from a woman named Maria Roberts; in the letter, Maria asks Clint for a photography job for her son at Clint and Viki's newspaper, The Banner. Having recently failed in her attempt to gain control of half-sister Viki Buchanan's estate, Tina is looking for any leverage she can use to further her plans. She travels to El Paso, Texas, to investigate Maria's connection to Clint.

Maria is Clint's former flame; their relationship had been quashed by Clint's father Asa, who had not wanted his son to marry the Mexican Maria Vasquez. Tina meets Cord, Maria's son with her rancher husband Al Roberts, and Tina and Cord immediately fall in love. Engaged to wealthy Richard Abbott, Tina is torn between her passion for Cord and her desire for money and status. She chooses Richard.

Al Roberts dies suddenly of a heart attack; in a deathbed letter to Cord, he reveals that Cord is actually Clint Buchanan's son. Asa intercepts the letter but Tina's ex, con man and murderer Mitch Laurence, already knows the secret; he tells Tina, who breaks her engagement with Richard and, without telling Cord about his true parentage, elopes with the new Buchanan heir. Tina blackmails Asa into giving Cord a million dollars, purportedly an inheritance from Al. Cord is less than thrilled to find out that Clint is his father, and when he discovers that his "inheritance" is from Asa, he insists on returning it. Horrified, Tina pretends to go along with Cord's wishes but secretly uses the money to buy an island in the Caribbean. When Cord finds out about Tina's duplicity, he leaves her.

Fearing that her son will reconcile with Tina, whom she despises, Maria makes a bargain with old friend Max Holden in 1987 to romance Tina and get her out of town. Tina discovers she is pregnant with Cord's child, but Maria manipulates events so that Cord does not find out; thinking Cord does not care about her or their baby, Tina leaves with Max for Buenos Aires, Argentina. Learning Tina is pregnant, Cord follows her to Argentina, with archaeologist Kate Sanders in tow. In the meantime, Max and Tina have gotten mixed up in a drug ring. Tina is kidnapped by Kate's brother, Jamie Sanders; escaping by boat with a captive Tina, Jamie is shot and falls over the side. Tina plummets over the Iguazu Falls, and she and her unborn baby are presumed dead.

=== Tina's return ===
Tina (Andrea Evans) returns with baby Al, 1987

Cord and Kate, already attracted to each other, get closer as she consoles him over the death of Tina and their child. They ultimately become engaged. Meanwhile, Tina turns up alive in the jungle, feverish and apparently having miscarried her baby. Found by Max's ex-girlfriend Gabrielle Medina, who is pregnant with Max's child, Tina recovers and helps deliver Gabrielle's baby boy. Thinking Max and Tina were headed for marriage, Gabrielle had not told him she was pregnant; with a plan in mind, Tina convinces Gabrielle that Max and Tina are man and wife and can give the baby a good life. Gabrielle hands her son over to Tina, who names him Al after Cord's deceased stepfather, and returns to Llanview. Tina appears at Cord and Kate's wedding with the baby, presenting Cord with "his son" and collapsing.

Stop! Am I too late? Cord, I've come so far … this is your son.

— Tina Lord Roberts, One Life to Live, 1987

His marriage to Kate invalid, Cord is happy that Tina and the baby are alive but still intends to divorce Tina and wed Kate. Maria discovers that the baby is really Max and Gabrielle's child, and she blackmails Tina into divorcing Cord. Obsessed with Clint, Maria decides to kill Viki and frame Tina for the crime. After failing to run down Viki with her car, Maria applies a contact poison to a pair of earrings Tina intends to give her sister as a gift. Gabrielle collapses after touching the earrings but survives; the vial of poison spills on Maria during a struggle with Tina, and Maria dies.

Tina is arrested for murder, and the secret of baby Al's parentage comes out during the trial. Tina is convicted but later exonerated; she and Cord fall into bed, but he still loves Kate. Though still attracted to Cord, Tina gives in to Max's persistent advances and accepts his wedding proposal. They soon hear that Tina's baby, delivered by the Argentine natives while Tina was consumed by fever, is alive and being cared for in the jungle. As Max and Tina search for the child, Kate breaks it off with Cord and leaves town.

=== A second chance ===
After much adventure, Max and Tina bring baby "Milagro" (miracle) back to Llanview in 1988. Cord and Tina name their son Clinton James Roberts, or "CJ" for short. When Tina says "I take thee, Cord" during her wedding to Max, he calls it off. Tina resumes her pursuit of Cord, who is now involved with Sarah Gordon. Tina and Cord reconcile for time, but Tina is soon pursued by Cord's uncle, Bo Buchanan, who is newly returned to Llanview. It is soon revealed that Tina's suitor is actually a "faux Bo": Kate Sanders' ex Dr. Patrick London, hired by Asa's enemies to get facial reconstruction and infiltrate the family. Patrick, as Bo, hopes to marry Tina and gain control of her money. He is later found out, and killed by his captive, the real Bo.

Cord and Tina remarry in November 1988 in a double ceremony with Cord's grandfather Asa Buchanan and Renee Divine. Tina's enemy Ursula Blackwell rigs the wedding cake to explode, but the blast kills Max's brother Steve Holden instead. Cord and Tina's marriage ultimately collapses again in 1990 over Tina's lies. The final nail in the coffin comes when Tina accuses Cord of having an affair with Gabrielle's sister Debra; Cord asks for a divorce, and Tina leaves town for San Diego with baby C.J.

=== Further appearances ===
Cord returns briefly in 2004 to escort daughter Sarah Roberts to London and off the series, and again on August 16 and August 17, 2007, to attend the funeral of his grandfather Asa Buchanan. Cord again reappears on July 22, 2008, during a telephone conversation with Clint and once more on August 11 and August 12, 2008. Visiting Llanview briefly on August 11 and August 12, 2008, Cord is reunited with Tina, who has reappeared in town after an 11-year absence and already endangered their daughter Sarah's life in one of her schemes. Tina is devastated when Cord tells her that she has not changed, and they can never be together.

Cord also returns to Llanview on in September 2011 on business for Buchanan Enterprises and the involvement of his newly found brother, Rex Balsom, in its running. Cord is soon reunited with Tina again after she comes to Llanfair to spend the night returning for Victor Lord Jr.'s will reading. Cord eventually admits he still had feelings for Tina because they share a bond due to their past together and the fact that they share kids with each other. On November 15, 2011, Tina interrupts the wedding of niece Natalie to Brody Lovett with paternity test results saying that John McBain, not Brody, is the father of Natalie's baby Liam, which causes the wedding to be called off immediately. Cord and Tina take advantage of the cancelled wedding and reception preparations and marry for the fourth time.

== See also ==
- Buchanan family
