= Thom Christopher =

American actor (1940–2024)

- Born: October 5, 1940; New York City, U.S.
- Died: December 5, 2024 (aged 84)
- Occupation: Actor
- Years active: 1972–2017
- Spouse: Judith Leverone (m. 1971; died 2019)

Thomas N. Portelli (October 5, 1940 – December 5, 2024), known professionally as Thom Christopher, was an American actor.

== Life and career ==
Christopher attended Ithaca College and studied acting at the Neighborhood Playhouse.

He was best known for his portrayal of villainous upstate Pennsylvania mob boss Carlo Hesser (1990–1992, 1996–1997, 2005, 2006, 2008) on the ABC soap opera, One Life to Live He also portrayed Hesser's meek twin Mortimer Bern (1992–1993, 1997). He is also known for playing Hawk, a half-man, half-bird warrior in the second season of Buck Rogers in the 25th Century in 1981.

Christopher also had roles on soap operas such as Loving and Guiding Light. He created the role of Noel Douglas on the CBS soap opera The Edge of Night.

Christopher died on December 5, 2024, aged 84.

== Filmography ==
=== Film ===
- 1980: S*H*E as Eddie Bronzi
- 1983: Space Raiders as "Flightplan"
- 1985: Wizards of the Lost Kingdom as Shurka
- 1988: Deathstalker and the Warriors from Hell as Troxartas (V)
- 2003: Nola as Niles Sterling

=== Television ===
- 1974: The Edge of Night as Noel Douglas #1
- 1975: Cannon, episode "The Hero"
- 1978: The Eddie Capra Mysteries, episode "The Two-Million-Dollar Stowaway" as Eugene Meriwether Smith
- 1981: Buck Rogers in the 25th Century as "Hawk"
- 1983: Simon & Simon - "All Your Favourite Games" as Sid Castle - S03 E12
- 1984: T. J. Hooker - "Too Late for Love" as Harry Cort and "Death Strip" as Paul Gavin
- 1987: Simon & Simon** - "Lost Lady" as Gary Radcliffe - S6 E21
- 1987–1989: Murder, She Wrote - "Trouble in Eden" as Reverend Willard Manchester and "Appointment in Athens" as Dimitri Popadopalous
- 1990–2008: One Life to Live as Carlo Hesser / Mortimer Bern
- 2000–2004: Law & Order- "Stiff" as Dr. Bertram Stokes and "Caviar Emptor" as Alferandi Dilmanian
- 1993–1994: Loving as Dante Partou / Joe Young
- 1999–2002: Guiding Light as Colonel Dax

=== Video games ===
- 2003: Cyberchase: Castleblanca Quest as The Hacker

== Stage ==
Theatre credits
Year	Title	Role	Venue	Refs.
1974	Noël Coward in Two Keys	Felix	Ethel Barrymore Theater, Broadway	
1977	Caesar and Cleopatra	Apollodorus	Palace Theatre, Broadway	
1989	The Investigation of the Murder in El Salvador	D'Costa	New York Theatre Workshop, Off-Broadway	
1994	The Triumph of Love	Hermocrate	Classic Stage Company, Off-Broadway	
1997	The Changeling	performer	Theatre at St. Clement's, Off-Broadway	
1997	Stevie Wants To Play The Blues	Ernest	Williamstown Theatre Festival, Massachusetts	
2000	Night Blooming Jasmine	Michael Hernick	TriBeCa Playhouse, Off-Broadway	
2008	Another Vermeer	Dr. Abraham Bredius	Abingdon Theater Company, Off-Broadway	

== Awards ==
Award	Year	Category	For	Result
AACTA Awards	1973-74	Theatre World Award	Noel Coward in Two Keys	Won
Daytime Emmy Awards	1992	Outstanding Supporting Actor in a Drama Series	One Life to Live	Won
Daytime Emmy Awards	1993	Outstanding Supporting Actor in a Drama Series	One Life to Live	Nominated
Daytime Emmy Awards	1993	Outstanding Supporting Actor in a Drama Series	Loving	Nominated
Soap Opera Digest Awards	1992	Outstanding Villain: Daytime	One Life to Live	Nominated
Soap Opera Digest Awards	1993	Outstanding Supporting Actor	One Life to Live	Nominated
