= Fiona Hutchison =

American actress

Fiona Hutchinson
- Born: Miami, Florida
- Occupation: Actress

Fiona Hutchison is an American actress. She is known for her roles on the American soap operas One Life to Live and Guiding Light.

== Personal life ==
Hutchison was born in Miami, Florida, to British parents. She grew up in South Miami, Jamaica, and Columbia, South Carolina and has two older brothers.

Hutchison married assistant director Sean Dromgoole in 1987 but they would divorce in 1992. She married actor John Viscardi on 16 September 1994. They have two sons, Hutch (born 3 September 1996) and Trevor Westcott (born March 1998).

== Career ==
In 1985, Hutchison appeared on Guiding Light as Jenna, but is best known for her roles as Gabrielle Medina on One Life to Live (1987–1991, 2001–2004) and as Jenna Bradshaw on Guiding Light (1992–1994, 1996–1998). She later appeared for a brief stint as Celia Frasier on As the World Turns in 2000. In 2006, Hutchison made a one-day return to Guiding Light for a special Mother's Day episode and returned again in 2009 for several episodes, as many former stars returned for the show's final episodes. Hutchinson returned to One Life to Life as her deceased character, Gabrielle, on 9 January 2012.
