= Peggy O'Shea =

American screenwriter

Mary Margaret "Peggy" O'Shea (October 3, 1922 – May 1, 2014) was an American screenwriter. She wrote primarily for daytime soap operas.

== Biography ==
Born in Niagara Falls, New York, O'Shea began writing for television with her former husband Lou Shaw for such series as Dr. Kildare, Ben Casey, and Have Gun – Will Travel.

She later served as head writer for One Life to Live from 1979 to 1983, Capitol from 1983 to 1984, and again for One Life to Live from 1984 to 1987. She also wrote for Peyton Place. She and her husband Lou wrote the script of "The Pearl Necklace" (with Hazel Court and Edward Truex), for a 1961 episode of Alfred Hitchcock Presents. She won a Writers Guild of America Award and a Daytime Emmy Award for her work on One Life to Live. She was also nominated for a total of four Writers Guild of America Awards and five Daytime Emmy Awards.

While writing for One Life to Live, O'Shea lived in New York City, and she later moved to Los Angeles. On May 1, 2014, she died of complications from a stroke. She was 91. She was survived by a son from her marriage to Shaw.

== Awards and nominations ==
Daytime Emmy Awards

WINS

- (1987; Best Writing; One Life to Live)

NOMINATIONS

- (1980, 1981, 1982 & 1983; Best Writing; One Life to Live)

Writers Guild of America Award

WINS

- (1986 season; One Life to Live)

NOMINATIONS

- (1979 & 1987 seasons; One Life to Live)
- (1984 season; Capitol)

== Head writing tenure ==
Preceded by Ann Marcus	Head Writer of Search for Tomorrow; November 19, 1975 – December 10, 1976	Succeeded by Irving Elman
Preceded by Gordon Russell; Sam Hall	Head Writer of One Life to Live (with Sam Hall); March 17, 1980 — April 15, 1983	Succeeded by Sam Hall solo (April 18-November 18, 1983 with Henry Slesar
Preceded by John William Corrington; Joyce Hooper Corrington	Head Writer of Capitol; 1983 — 1984	Succeeded by Henry Slesar
Preceded by Sam Hall: December 17-21, 1984	Head Writer of One Life to Live (with Sam Hall: Solo December 17-21, 1984, Duo from December 24, 1984 —June 28, 1985); December 24, 1984 — June 5, 1987	Succeeded by S. Michael Schnessel
