= John Loprieno =

American actor and writer (born 1960)

- Born: Chicago, Illinois, U.S.
- Education: Lewis University
- Occupation: Actor

John A. Loprieno is an American actor and writer. He has appeared on the soap operas Search for Tomorrow and As the World Turns, but is perhaps best known for his role as Cord Roberts on the ABC soap opera One Life to Live. He has also appeared in a double episode of Star Trek:Voyager in Season 4: Year of Hell.

== Early life and acting career ==
Loprieno was born in Chicago, Illinois, and attended Lewis University.

He portrayed Cord Roberts on One Life to Live from 1986 through 1992, and then from 1993 to 1997. He returned briefly in 2004, and then again on August 16 and August 17, 2007, for One Life to Live's 9,999th and 10,000th episodes. He reappeared on July 22, 2008, during one of the show's 40th-anniversary episodes, and again on August 11, 2008. Loprieno once again reprised his role as Cord Roberts on September 29, 2011.

== Teaching career ==
Loprieno has been an adjunct faculty member at Harper College. He is currently teaching acting at Moorpark College in Southern California.
