= Sam Hall (writer) =

American screenwriter

- Born: Allison Samuel Hall; March 11, 1921; Carrollton, Ohio, United States
- Died: September 26, 2014 (aged 93); Rhinebeck, New York
- Occupation: Television writer
- Spouse: Sam Hall (m. 1952–1985)
- Parent(s): Samuel Hall, Beatrice Hall

Allison Samuel Hall (March 11, 1921 – September 26, 2014), known as Sam Hall, was a screenwriter known for his work in daytime soap operas, particularly Dark Shadows (from 1967 to 1971) and One Life to Live (from 1975 to 1985). Hall also co-wrote the 1976 PBS miniseries The Adams Chronicles.

== Personal life ==
Hall was born in Carrollton, Ohio, in 1921 to Samuel and Beatrice Hall. He was married to actress Grayson Hall, an Academy Award nominee who appeared on both shows, as Dr. Julia Hoffman on Dark Shadows, and as Euphemia Ralston on One Life to Live.

Later in life, Hall took an active part in the production of "War Games," a play he wrote and performed at the Rhinebeck Theatre's barn in the early 2000s.

== Dark Shadows ==
The first serial for which Hall wrote was The Brighter Day. After his wife was hired to appear on Dark Shadows, he was invited to become one of the writers. Hall and his writing partner, Gordon Russell, were best known for their work on Dark Shadows and One Life to Live. (His son with Grayson Hall, Matthew Hall, was a later writer for the NBC revival of Dark Shadows.)

== One Life to Live ==
After Dark Shadows wrapped, Hall and Russell then began work on One Life to Live. Hall later wrote for the shows Another World and then, again, for One Life to Live with different collaborators (including Peggy O'Shea and Henry Slesar.)

== Death ==
Hall died on September 26, 2014, in Rhinebeck, New York at the age of 93.

== Awards and nominations ==
Daytime Emmy Awards

NOMINATIONS

- (1980, 1981, 1982 & 1983; Best Writing; One Life to Live)
- (1990; Best Writing; Santa Barbara)

Writers Guild of America Award

WINS

- (1986 season; One Life to Live)
- (1991 season; Santa Barbara)

NOMINATIONS

- (1979 season; One Life to Live)
