= James DePaiva =

American actor (born 1957)

- Born: James Paul DePaiva; October 8, 1957 (age 67); Hayward, California, U.S.
- Occupation: Actor
- Years active: 1985–present
- Spouse(s): Patti Hansen (m. 1981; div. 1983) Misty Rowe (m. 1986; div. 1995) Kassie DePaiva (m. 1996)
- Children: 2

James Paul DePaiva (born October 8, 1957) is an American actor. He is best known for playing the role of Max Holden on the ABC soap opera One Life to Live (1987 to 1990, 1991 to 2003, returning briefly in 2007).

== Early life ==
DePaiva was born in Hayward, California, but he was raised in Livermore. He is related to a Central Park designer and also former U.S. President Andrew Johnson. DePaiva's father was a jazz musician. He has said that he was raised in a very strict household. In his early teens, he struggled with his weight and became insecure.

DePaiva started acting in school plays when he was in the seventh grade. Instead of pursuing it, he focused on music. He began playing the electric bass professionally at the age of fifteen. DePaiva played punk rock, Latin rock, and country-western in several bands, including Livewire. He got a job at a music store and became an apprentice, eventually making plans to buy the store.

When DePaiva was twenty two, his father died from cancer. At the time of his father's death, he was abusing drugs. He decided to stop taking drugs and focus on the career that he really wanted, which was acting. DePaiva studied drama, as well as fencing, ballet, and jazz dance at a community college.

== Career ==
DePaiva's early roles were in local theater. His stage credits include The Fifth of July, The Hasty Heart, The Desk Set, Company, The Sound of Music, The School for Scandal, and All's Well That Ends Well. He acted for several months at a repertory theatre in Solvang. DePaiva met someone who offered to introduce him to an agent and also the casting director of the ABC soap opera General Hospital, if he would take a role in his play. DePaiva did the play, then moved to Los Angeles.

After meeting with Marvin Page, the casting director of General Hospital, DePaiva became an extra on the show, then an under-five. He finally landed a recurring role in 1985, playing a waiter who flirted with Holly (Emma Samms). The character was credited at the time as Greenhouse Waiter. He didn't receive a name until 1995, when DePaiva was interviewed for the book General Hospital: The Complete Scrapbook. Author Gary Warner asked him to supply a character name to print in the book and DePaiva told him it was Eddie Holton, which was actually the name of a crew member he worked with on One Life to Live.

DePaiva took acting classes and studied with Stella Adler. He appeared as a day player on the NBC soap opera Days of Our Lives and guest starred on Simon & Simon. He auditioned for the role of Jamie Frame on the NBC soap opera Another World (which went to Laurence Lau).

DePaiva landed his big break when he joined the cast of the ABC soap opera One Life to Live as Max Holden in 1987. He played the role until December 1988, when he announced that he wouldn't be signing a new contract. Eight days after leaving, he started negotiating a new contract with the show and began appearing on screen again two months later. In early 1990, he announced that he would be leaving again. The role was recast with Nicholas Walker.

DePaiva moved to Los Angeles, where he guest starred on an episode of Mathnet. He also appeared in a television commercial for Fruit of the Loom, co-starring with Ed Marinaro and Patrick Duffy. He returned to One Life to Live as Max Holden in October 1991. DePaiva and his OLTL co-stars Susan Batten and David Ledingham appeared in the music video for Roy Orbison and K.d. lang's "Cryin'" in 1992.

In 1997, DePaiva nearly left One Life to Live to play Ben Warren on the CBS soap opera Guiding Light, a character who had been created for him. He decided to stay on OLTL and the role went to Hunt Block instead.

On February 14, 2002, DePaiva and his wife, Kassie DePaiva, starred on stage in A. R. Gurney's Love Letters at Jersey Central Theatre.

In 2003, DePaiva announced at One Life to Live's annual fan club gathering that he had been dismissed from the show. His final airdate was October 27, 2003. He made a brief return to the series in August 2007 for the 9,999th and 10,000th episodes.

DePaiva directed the 2006 film Undone, which was produced by his wife, Kassie DePaiva. The film starred Kassie, Heather Tom, Forbes March, Timothy D. Stickney, and Ricky Paull Goldin. DePaiva began directing episodes of One Life to Live in the late 1990s. After leaving the role of Max in 2003, he continued to direct the show. He also directed episodes of the CBS soap opera As the World Turns.

In 2009, DePaiva and his wife, Kassie DePaiva, starred in a Time Life infomercial for a CD box set, The Power of Love.

In January 2010, DePaiva co-starred with Georgia Engel in High Spirits, a musical take on Noël Coward's play Blithe Spirit at the Community School of Naples. In April 2011, he starred in Nightmare Alley at The Players Theatre in New York. He also appeared in a production of Tricky Wicked Bitch. Returning to the Community School of Naples, DePaiva co-starred with his wife, Kassie DePaiva, in the musical 110 in the Shade in May 2013.

DePaiva played Eddy Parish on the web series Tainted Dreams in 2013. From June 2017 to 2018, he played the recurring role of Dr. David Bensch on General Hospital. He starred on stage as Dr. Jack Chase in Chasing Jack. The play ran from October 5-8, 2017 at Fordham University School of Law.

== Personal life ==
DePaiva's first marriage ended in divorce. He then married actress Misty Rowe, best known for Hee Haw, on June 4, 1986. Rowe suffered a miscarriage in 1990, during her sixth month of pregnancy. A medical error occurred during dilation and curettage, causing her to hemorrhage excessively. Soon after, she became ill due to a reaction from a bee sting. Rowe recovered and eventually became pregnant again, giving birth to their daughter in July 1992 in Los Angeles. DePaiva wasn't present at the birth, because he was on a flight from New York, where One Life to Live was filmed. Rowe announced to Soap Opera Digest in February 1995 that DePaiva had asked her for a divorce.

He first met Kassie DePaiva (then known by her maiden name, Kassie Wesley) in the late 1980s at the Whaler Bar in New York, where she was singing. They didn't see each other again until 1993, when she was cast on One Life to Live. They were married on May 31, 1996 at the courthouse in her hometown of Morganfield, Kentucky. Kassie has said that she scheduled her wedding in between a dentist appointment and a golf game. They had a more formal wedding in June 1996 at their home in the Catskills. The ceremony included DePaiva's daughter, who was then four years old.

The DePaivas have one son, James Quentin (J. Q.) DePaiva, who was born on May 12, 1997. When he was twelve months old, they learned that he had been born with an enlarged vestibular aqueduct, an inner-ear abnormality that caused him to be completely deaf. He received his first cochlear implant at eighteen months old and his second at eight years old. The DePaivas have lobbied congress to make hearing tests mandatory for newborns in all fifty states. In September 2007, J. Q. had a recurring role as Jason on All My Children. His character appeared on Erica Kane's television show at her request in hopes that he would help her daughter Kendall deal with the hearing loss of her own son, Spike.
