= Russ Anderson (actor) =

American actor

- Born: Rochester, Minnesota, U.S.
- Education: University of Northern Iowa
- Occupation: Actor
- Years active: 1984–present

Russell "Russ" Anderson (born October 27) is an American actor. He is best known for playing the role of Steve Holden on the ABC soap opera One Life to Live (1987 to 1988).

== Early life ==
Anderson was born in Rochester, Minnesota and raised in Pine Island. He graduated from the University of Northern Iowa with a Bachelor of Arts degree in speech communication and theater.

== Career ==
Anderson was cast in a thirty-eight state tour of The Two Gentlemen of Verona with the National Shakespeare Company. He also acted in summer stock. He had day player roles on Loving and Guiding Light. Anderson spent a year auditioning for hundreds of television commercials, but didn't land any of them.

Anderson had a recurring role on Highway to Heaven in 1984. He appeared in the mini-series Crossings (1986). He was cast as Steve Holden on the ABC soap opera One Life to Live in 1987, playing the role until 1988.

He guest starred on two episodes of Designing Women. He appeared in the TV movies Money, Power, Murder (1989) and Shattered Dreams (1990). Anderson guest starred on Matlock in 1991. He had a role in the play First Lady at the Yale Repertory Theatre in 1996.

Anderson appeared on As the World Turns on April 19, 1999, playing the father of Julia (Annie Parisse). He guest starred on Law & Order: Special Victims Unit in 2000 and 2003. Anderson played Larry in Closer at Houston's Alley Theatre from October to November 2000. He made a guest appearance on Sex and the City in 2001. On stage, he played Tom in Dinner with Friends at the Coconut Grove Playhouse.

In 2001, Anderson was an under study for the role of Murray Burns in the Broadway revival of A Thousand Clowns. In July 2002, he played Dr. Bayless in a production of Arthur Miller's All My Sons at the Old Globe Theatre in San Diego. Anderson starred in George Bernard Shaw's Heartbreak House at New York's Pearl Theatre in 2003.

He was cast in a recurring role on Guiding Light as Dr. Christopher Langham, first airing June 6, 2003. He continued to play the role until 2004. He guest starred on Law & Order in 2006. From February to March 2006, he had a role in a production of After Ashley in Philadelphia. In May 2006, he appeared on stage in Dead City at New York's 3LD Art & Technology Center.

== Filmography ==
Year	Title	Role	Notes
1984	Highway to Heaven	Mac	2 episodes Credited as Russell Anderson
1986	Crossings	Civilian Friend	Television mini-series Credited as Russell Anderson
1987–1988	One Life to Live	Steve Holden	Contract role
1987; 1989	Designing Women	Jim Cline; Worth Carrington	2 episodes Credited as Russell Anderson
1989; 2003–2004	Guiding Light	Rev. Jones; Dr. Christopher Langham	Day player; Recurring role
1989	Money, Power, Murder	David	Television film
1989	The Bold and the Beautiful	Dylan Smith	2 episodes
1990	Shattered Dreams	Wilkes	Television film
1991	Matlock	Jeff Holden	Episode: "The Foursome"
1999	As the World Turns	Mr. Lindsay	Episode: April 19, 1999
2000; 2003	Law & Order: Special Victims Unit	Roger Morse; Charlie Poe	2 episodes
2001	Sex and the City	Cliff Watson	Episode: "Baby, Talk is Cheap"
2004	Rescue Me	Bobby "Teflon" Teff	2 episodes
2006	Law & Order	Judge Peter Waring	Episode: "Release"
