= Paul Rauch =

American television and film producer

Paul Rauch (December 23, 1933 – December 10, 2012) was an American television and film producer. Rauch's work was primarily in American soap operas.

== Career ==
Rauch's earlier jobs included Vice President, Programs-East Coast for CBS, Supervising Producer for Procter & Gamble, and Music Critic for an English-language edition of the Japanese Yomiuri Shimbun, a job he held in his mid-twenties.

== Daytime drama ==
=== Another World ===
Rauch is best known for his work on Another World, which he produced from 1972 to 1982. For much of that time, he worked in conjunction with head writer Harding Lemay, and the team garnered the show critical acclaim and strong ratings. In the 1970s Daytime ratings, Another World often rose to the top of the ratings, just below number one show As the World Turns and Guiding Light.

Rauch led the show to an expanded hour format in 1975, which was a success. However, a subsequent time expansion to 90 minutes in 1979 was less successful.

During his tenure on Another World, he served as co-creator and executive producer of two other NBC soap operas. Rauch first co-created Lovers and Friends (January–May 1977) with Lemay; however, the low ratings under its original format prompted NBC to put the show on what would be a seven-month hiatus during the Summer and Fall of 1977, with the soap being reworked as For Richer For Poorer (1977–78). Two years after For Richer For Poorer was canceled, Rauch teamed with the husband-and-wife team of John William and Joyce Corrington to create Texas (1980–82), a spin-off of Another World envisioned as a daytime equivalent to the hit CBS prime time soap Dallas; Rauch served as executive producer of the show (simultaneous with his showrunner duties on Another World) until 1981.

=== Other daytime credits ===
Following his works on Another World (1972–1982), Lovers and Friends and For Richer For Poorer, and Texas (1980–1981), he was hired by ABC Daytime to be a producer for One Life to Live in 1983. He served as executive producer from 1984 to 1991.

In Ellen Holly’s book, Holly is vocal about her frustration at her character being pushed into the background to make way for new white characters, and about being summarily dismissed in 1985 by Rauch, who by that time had become executive producer and writing consultant. Rauch fired every Black lead or recurring character on One Life To Live during his 1984-91 tenure.

In addition, he was executive producer of Santa Barbara from 1991 to 1993, and Guiding Light from 1996 to 2002.

Rauch appeared at the end of the final episode of Santa Barbara on January 15, 1993. The final shot consisted of Rauch standing in front of the camera, smashing a cigar under his shoe, and walking away.

From 2003 to 2005, he was an executive consulting producer to a period-drama that aired on Russian television, called Bednaya Nastya. From 2008 to 2011, he was the executive producer of the serial The Young and the Restless.

On August 22, 2013, Grant Aleksander, who had portrayed Phillip Spaulding on Guiding Light from 1983 through the series finale in 2009, revealed in an interview with Carolyn Hinsey that Rauch had been working on a continuation of Guiding Light at the time of his death on December 10, 2012. According to the interview he had consulted with the Big Networks executives regarding the proposal and Procter & Gamble were interested as well.

=== Other credits ===
In 2009 Paul Rauch was named "The Greatest Daytime Producer of All Time" by TV Guide Canada, while he served as co-executive producer of the #1 daytime show The Young & the Restless. Rauch also produced the feature films Lover's Knot and Run the Wild Fields (Film Advisory Board Award, special honors at the Sarasota Film Festival, Emmy, Best Family Film), as well as the 100-episode primetime series Poor Nastya for Sony Pictures Int. and Russia 3.

== Personal life ==
At the time of his death, aged 78 (almost 79), Rauch was married to concert pianist Israela Margalit. The couple lived in New York City.

== Positions held ==
Vice President, Daytime Programs, CBS Vice President, Programs - East Coast, CBS (1970–1972)

Texas

- Co-Creator
- Executive Producer (July 1980 - April 1981)

Another World

- Executive Producer (November 1971 - 1983)

One Life to Live

- Executive Producer ( July 2, 1984 - June 28, 1991)

Santa Barbara

- Executive Producer (January 1992 - January 15, 1993)

Guiding Light

- Executive Producer (November 1996 - December 24, 2002)

The Young and the Restless

- Consultant (August 2008 - October 2, 2008)
- Co-Executive Producer (October 3, 2008 - May 10, 2011)
