= List of One Life to Live cast members =

This is a list of actors and actresses who have had roles on the soap opera One Life to Live. For a full historical character listing, see List of One Life to Live characters.

== Cast members ==
Actor	Character	Duration
Mary Kay Adams	Death	1992
Jerry Adler	Len Hanen	1995
Denny Albee	Peter Janssen	1980–82
Eddie Alderson	Matthew Buchanan	2001–12
Kristen Alderson	Starr Manning	1998–2012
Brooke Alexander	Julia Michaels	2001
Terry Alexander	Troy Nichols	1990–92
Tammy Amerson	Mari Lynn Dennison	1986–89
John Amos	Bill Moore	1986
Maggie Andersson	Jessica Buchanan	1998
Russ Anderson	Steve Holden	1987–88
Gerald Anthony	Marco Dane	1977–86, 1989–90
Gerald Anthony	Mario Corelli	1978
Melissa Archer	Natalie Buchanan	2001–13
Melissa Archer	Maria Roberts	2008
Jack Armstrong	Kevin Buchanan	1994–95
Matthew Ashford	Drew Ralston	1982–83
Matthew Ashford	Stephen Haver	2003–04
Humbert Allen Astredo	Bruno Weston	1979
Steve Austin	Brian Kendall	1975–78
Phylicia Ayers-Allen	Courtney Wright	1983–84
Reiko Aylesworth	Rebecca Lewis	1993–94
Jane Badler	Melinda Cramer	1978–81, 1983
Sam Ball	Drew Buchanan	1998
Lisa Banes	Eve McBain	2004
Camila Banus	Lola Montez	2008–09
Judith Barcroft	Victoria Lord	1987
Nancy Barrett	Rachel Wilson	1974
Nancy Barrett	Debra Van Druden	1982
Peter Bartlett	Nigel Bartholomew-Smythe	1991–2013
Peter Bartlett	Chuck Wilson	2008
Peter Bartlett	Neville Bartholomew-Smythe	2009–10
Kathy Bates	Evelyn Maddox	1984
Susan Batten	Luna Moody	1991–96, 2002–04, 2012
Kaitlyn Bausch	Briana Marland	2013
Orson Bean	Harrison Logan	1982
Jennifer Rae Beck	Eleanor Vaughn	2004
Chris Beetem	Tate Harmon	2007
Phyllis Behar	Anna Wolek	1978–82
Doris Belack	Anna Wolek	1968–77
Lynn Benesch	Meredith Lord	1969–73, 1987
Esteban Benito	Diego Padilla	2013
Tom Berenger	Tim Siegel	1975–76
Ellen Bethea	Rachel Gannon	1992–95, 2000–02, 2005
Jack Betts	Dr. Ivan Kipling	1979–85
Kimaree Beyrent	Megan Craig Riley	1974–75
Yasmine Bleeth	LeeAnn Demerest	1991–93
Corbin Bleu	Jeffrey King	2013
Hunt Block	Lee Ramsey	2007–08
Justis Bolding	Sarah Roberts	2007–09
John Bolger	John Sykes	1998–2001, 2004
Laura Bonarrigo	Cassie Callison	1991–99, 2001–04, 2010
Chris Bones	Jared Banks	2008
BethAnn Bonner	Talia Sahid	2006–09
Evan Bonifant	Al Holden	1991–93
Bronwen Booth	Andy Harrison	1989–91
Roscoe Born	Mitch Laurence	1985–87, 2002–03, 2009–10, 2012
Katrina Bowden	Britney Jennings	2006
Jonathan Brandis	Kevin Buchanan	1982–83
Jane Alice Brandon	Cathy Craig	1971–72
Jennifer Bransford	Georgie Phillips	1997–98
Mark Brettschneider	Jason Webb	1991–94
Kathy Brier	Marcie Walsh McBain	2002–09, 2011
Brenda Brock	Brenda McGillis	1988–91
Brenda Brock	May McGillis	1988
John Brotherton	Jared Banks	2007–10
John Brotherton	Clint Buchanan	2008
Peter Brouwer	Beaver Calhoun	2007
Kimberlin Brown	Paige Miller	2004–05
Kale Browne	Sam Rappaport	1998–2001
Scott Bryce	Ed Crosby	2006–07
Jensen Buchanan	Sarah Gordon	1987–90
Ryan and Sean Buckley	Al Holden	1990–91
Brandon Buddy	Cole Thornhart	2006–10
Shelly Burch	Delilah Ralston	1982–89, 2001
Arthur Burghardt	Jack Scott	1978–80
Catherine Burns	Cathy Craig	1969–70
Robert Burton	Peter Janssen	1980
Kerry Butler	Claudia Reston	2006–07
Jeffrey Byron	Richard Abbott	1986–87
Anthony Call	Herb Callison	1978–93
Alice Callahan	Kate Lane	2013
Michael Callan	Jack Simmons	1985
Rob Campbell	Zeus Zelenko	1997
David Canary	Adam Chandler	2000, 2005
Philip Carey	Asa Buchanan	1979–2008
Philip Carey	Buck Buchanan	1988
Laura Carrington	Lisa Baron	1986–87
Vince Carroll	Father Gallagher	1977
Dixie Carter	Dorian Lord	1974
Matt Cavenaugh	Mark Solomon	2004–05
Christina Chambers	Marty Saybrooke	2006–07
Charissa Chamorro	Sophia Pellegrino	1999–2001
Loyita Chapel	Blaize Buchanan	1988
Loyita Chapel	Dallas Jones	1999, 2005, 2008
Loyita Chapel	Renée Divine Buchanan	2008
Judith Chapman	Sandra Montaigne	1987
Crystal Chappell	Maggie Carpenter	1995–97
Courtney Chase	Sarah Roberts	1993–94
David Chisum	Miles Laurence	2007–08
Nick Choksi	Vimal Patel	2010–13
Marilyn Chris	Wanda Webb	1972–77, 1980–94
Shawn Christian	Ross Rayburn	2002
Catherine Ann Christiansen	Jane Ebert	1991
Robin Christopher	Skye Chandler	1999–2001
Thom Christopher	Carlo Hesser	1990–92, 1996–97, 2005, 2008
Thom Christopher	Mortimer Bern	1992–93, 1997
Eliza Clark	Jessica Buchanan	1990
Marsha Clark	Tina Lord	1984–85
Brett Claywell	Kyle Lewis	2009–10
Herve Clermont	Jared Hall	2000
Scott Clifton	Schuyler Joplin	2009–10
Chase Coleman	Garrett	2006
Míriam Colón	Maria "Abuelita" Delgado	1996–97
Terri Conn	Aubrey Wentworth	2010–11
Linda Cook	Ellen Foley	2005–06
Ryan Cooper	Bruce Hunter	2013
Joan Copeland	Gwendolyn Lord Abbott	1978–79
Joan Copeland	Selma Hanen	1995
Amanda Cortinas	Adriana Cramer	2003
Nicolas Coster	Anthony Makana	1983-84
Jacqueline Courtney	Pat Ashley	1975–83
Jacqueline Courtney	Maggie Ashley	1979
Christopher Cousins	Cain Rogan	1991–94, 2008
William Cox	Tim Siegel	1970–71
Cusi Cram	Cassie Callison	1981–83
Bryan Cranston	Dean Stella	1985
Anthony Crivello	Johnny Dee Hesser	1990
Marcia Cross	Kate Sanders	1986–87
John Cullum	Artie Duncan	1969
Steven Culp	Daniel Wolek	1983–84
Chris Cunningham	Kevin Buchanan	1981–82
John Cunningham	Carl Eberhert	1982
John Cunningham	Walter Honeycutt	2008
Augusta Dabney	Helena Ashley	1979
Arlene Dahl	Lucinda Schenck	1983–84
Linda Dano	Rae Cummings	1978–80, 1999–2004
Henry Darrow	Dante Medina	1987
Amanda Davies	Victoria Lord	2003
Guy Davis	Josh Hall	1985–86
Herb Davis	Bert Skelly	1969–72
Todd Davis	Josh Hall	1977
Lee Dawson	Wanda Webb	1977–79
Peter DeAnda	Price Trainor	1968–70
Tom Degnan	Joey Buchanan	2010–11
Lea DeLaria	Madame Delphina	1999, 2008–09, 2011
Lea DeLaria	Delbert Fina	2008, 2011
Kamar de los Reyes	Antonio Vega	1995–98, 2000–09
Janelle and Tamara DeMent	Jessica Buchanan	1986–88
James DePaiva	Max Holden	1987–2003, 2007
Kassie DePaiva	Blair Cramer	1993–2013
Mark Derwin	Ben Davidson	1999–2002, 2004, 2008
Susan Diol	Angela Holliday	1993–94
Mark Dobies	Daniel Colson	2003–05
Kevin Dobson	Harrison Brooks	2008
Terry Donahoe	Connie O'Neill	1985–86
Joanne Dorian	Victoria Lord	1970–71
Christopher Douglas	Dylan Moody	1994–97, 2000
James Douglas	Marcus Polk	1985–87
Roma Downey	Johanna Leighton	1988
Julia Duffy	Karen Wolek	1977
Daphnée Duplaix	Rachel Gannon	2009–10
Bobbie Eakes	Krystal Carey	2004–05
Shenell Edmonds	Destiny Evans	2009–12
Taina Elg	Olympia Buchanan	1980–82
Patricia Elliott	Renée Divine Buchanan	1988–2011
Linda Emond	Kara Richardson	1997
Andrea Evans	Tina Lord	1978–81, 1985–90, 2008, 2011
Andrea Evans	Irene Manning	1985
Scott Evans	Oliver Fish	2008–10
Jenni "JWoww" Farley	Nikki	2013
Farah Fath	Gigi Morasco	2007–12
Farah Fath	Emma Bradley	2008
Farah Fath	Stacy Morasco	2011
Nathan Fillion	Joey Buchanan	1994–97, 2007
Jason Alexander Fischer	Al Holden	1994–97
Laurence Fishburne	Josh Hall	1973–76
Alexa and Zoe Fisher	Sarah Roberts	1991
Lucinda Fisher	Debra Medina	1989–90
Niki Flacks	Karen Martin	1968–70
Steve Fletcher	Brad Vernon	1978–86
Ann Flood	Helen Guthrie	1990-91
Elijah and Isaiah Ford	Drew Buchanan II	2013
Faith Ford	Muffy Critchlow	1983
Bill Fowler	Tim Siegel	1969
Nancy Frangione	Tina Lord	1985
Al Freeman	Ed Hall	1972–88, 2000
Tom Fuccello	Paul Kendall	1977–79
David Fumero	Cristian Vega	1998–2011
Melissa Fumero	Adriana Cramer	2004–08, 2010–11
Sharon Gabet	Melinda Cramer	1987–89
Holly Gagnier	Cassie Callison	1986–88
Helen Gallagher	Maud Boylan	1997–98
Joseph Gallison	Tom Edwards	1969–71
Barbara Garrick	Allison Perkins	1986–87, 2001–03, 2008, 2010, 2012–13
Dan Gauthier	Kevin Buchanan	2003–07, 2009–10
Kirk Geiger	Kevin Buchanan	1992–94
Anthony George	Will Vernon	1977–84
Patrick J. Gibbons	Sam Manning	2010–13
Timothy Gibbs	Kevin Buchanan	1998–2001
Susan Gibney	Grace Atherton	1994
Mark Goddard	Ted Clayton	1981
Renée Elise Goldsberry	Evangeline Williamson	2003–07
Robert Gorrie	Matthew Buchanan	2013
Nancy Lee Grahn	Beverly Wilkes	1978–82
Farley Granger	Will Vernon	1976–77
Bernard Grant	Steve Burke	1970–75
Sandra P. Grant	Rachel Gannon	1996–98
Ernest Graves	Victor Lord	1968–74
David A. Gregory	Robert Ford	2009–12
Robert Gribbon	Richard Abbott	1980–81
Richard Grieco	Rick Gardner	1986–87
Robyn Griggs	Stephanie Hobart	1991–92
Jonathan Groff	Henry Mackler	2007
Margaret Gwenver	Blanche Ralston	1981–83
Ava Haddad	Cassie Callison	1983–86, 1990
Bruce Michael Hall	Joey Buchanan	2003–04
Jennifer Harmon	Cathy Craig	1976–78
Laura Harrier	Destiny Evans	2013
Danielle Harris	Sammi Garretson	1985–87
Steve Richard Harris	Seth Anderson	2002–03
Viola Harris	Selma Hanen	1993
Robert Harte	Michael McBain	2007
Susan Haskell	Marty Saybrooke	1992–97, 2004–05, 2008–11
Alexa Havins	Babe Carey	2003–05
Jacqueline Hendy	Vanessa Montez	2008–09
Catherine Hickland	Lindsay Rappaport	1998–2009, 2012
Catherine Hickland	Olympia Buchanan	2008
Marva Hicks	Jacara Principal	1997–98
Roger Hill	Alex Lowndes	1983–84
Steven Hill	Aristotle Descamedes	1984–85
Alice Hirson	Eileen Riley Siegel	1972–76
Robert Hogan	Charles Briggs	1995–98, 2000
Anna Kathryn Holbrook	Lindsay Butler	1993
Anna Kathryn Holbrook	Hannah Young	2007
Ellen Holly	Carla Gray	1968–80, 1983–85
Kaitlin Hopkins	Paula Simms	1991
Patrick Horgan	Andrew Berryman	1985
Patrick Horgan	Arthur Vandenburg	1995
Ward Horton	Dean Trayger	2013
Roger Howarth	Todd Manning	1992–98, 2000–03, 2011–13
Roger Howarth	Victor Lord, Jr.	2011
Elizabeth Hubbard	Estelle Chadwick	1983-84
Cady Huffman	Paige Miller	2005–06
Van Hughes	Cole Thornhart	2012
Crystal Hunt	Stacy Morasco	2009–10, 2012
Neith Hunter	Laura Jean Ellis	1990–91
Fiona Hutchison	Gabrielle Medina	1987–91, 2001–04, 2012
Sarah Hyland	Heather	2007
Vincent Irizarry	David Hayward	2005
Nadine Jacobson	Jessica Buchanan	2008
Francesca James	Marcy Wade	1970–72
Ariella and Natalie Jamnik	Starr Manning	1996–98
Ryan Janis	Kevin Buchanan	1983–90
Don Jeffcoat	Joey Buchanan	1997–2001
R. Brandon Johnson	Michael McBain	2003–04
R. Brandon Johnson	Chuck Wilson III	2007–08
R. Brandon Johnson	Chuck Wilson II	2008
Brian Victor Johnson	Asa Buchanan	2008
Christine Jones	Sheila Rafferty	1975–76
Christine Jones	Victoria Lord	1980–81, 1983
Christine Jones	Pamela Stuart	1985–88, 2001, 2008–09
Tommy Lee Jones	Mark Toland	1971–75
Wayne Jones	Bert Skelly	1969
Paul Joynt	Greg Huddleston	1977–79
Eddie Karr	Al Holden	1994
Dorrie Kavanaugh	Cathy Craig	1972–76
Jessica Kaye	Rebecca Lewis	2009
Thorsten Kaye	Patrick Thornhart	1995–97
Teri Keane	Naomi Vernon	1976–77
Elizabeth Keifer	Connie O'Neill	1984–85, 1988
Susan Keith	Samantha Vernon	1978–79
Josh Kelly	Cutter Wentworth	2010–11, 2013
Will Kempe	Ian Armitage	1997–98
Ken Kenitzer	Kevin Buchanan	1995
Ted King	Tomás Delgado	2011–12
Margaret Klenck	Edwina Lewis	1977–84
Mia Korf	Blair Cramer	1991–93
Ilene Kristen	Georgina Whitman	1982
Ilene Kristen	Roxy Balsom	2001–12
Felicity LaFortune	Nora Hanen Buchanan	2000
Diana Lamar	Irene Manning	1994–95
Mark LaMura	Douglas Kline	2007
Joe Lando	Jake Harrison	1990–92
Keith Langsdale	Richard Abbott	1980
Lisby Larson	Leigh Malone	2000
Lisby Larson	Eve McBain	2006
Dick Latessa	Neil Hayes	1997
Laurence Lau	Sam Rappaport	2001–03
John-Paul Lavoisier	Rex Balsom	2002–12
John-Paul Lavoisier	Bo Buchanan	2008
January LaVoy	Noelle Ortiz Stubbs	2007–09, 2011
January LaVoy	Rosa	2008
Yvette Lawrence	Maggie Vega	1992
Lee Lawson	Wanda Webb Wolek	1979
Mark Lawson	Brody Lovett	2008–12
Jennifer Leak	Matron Spitz	1986
John Paul Learn	Joey Buchanan	1985–90
Jessica Leccia	Inez Salinger	2010–11
David Ledingham	Suede Pruitt	1992–94
Amy Levitt	Cathy Craig	1970–71
Judith Light	Karen Wolek	1977–83
Lisa LoCicero	Sonia Toledo	1999, 2004
Dorian Lopinto	Samantha Vernon	1981–84
John Loprieno	Cord Roberts	1986–97, 2004, 2007–08, 2011
John Loprieno	Cody Vasquez	1988
Michael Lowry	Ross Rayburn	2009–10
Florencia Lozano	Téa Delgado	1997–2000, 2002, 2008–13
BarBara Luna	Maria Roberts	1986–88
Deanna Lund	Virginia Keyser	1980–81
Janice Lynde	Laurel Chapin	1984–86
Stephen Macht	Elliott Durbin	1996
Rebecca Mader	Margaret Cochran	2004
Heather MacRae	Tillie	2002–03
Yorlin Madera	Cristian Vega	1995–98
Kathleen Maguire	Anna Wolek	1977–78
Jessie Malakouti	Dusky	2013
Bailey Malik	Grace Davidson	1999
Claire Malis	Dorian Lord	1977–79
Randolph Mantooth	Alex Masters	1997
Randolph Mantooth	Kirk Harmon	2007
Lori March	Adele Huddleston	1977–79
Lori March	Eugenia Randolph Lord	1987
Stephen Markle	Mel Hayes	1997–99, 2008, 2010
Kelli Maroney	Tina Lord	1984
Nathaniel Marston	Al Holden	2001–04
Nathaniel Marston	Michael McBain	2004–07
Jared Martin	Donald Lamarr	1987–88
John Martin	Jon Russell	1986–89, 1991–92
A Martinez	Ray Montez	2008–09
Wayne Massey	Johnny Drummond	1980–84
Richard Mawe	Justice of the Peace	2009
Donald May	Mayor of Llanview	1968
Jan Maxwell	Cindy Brennan	2009
Curtis McClarin	Arnie	2007
Malachy McCourt	Mr. Kenneally	1995
Howard McGillin	Roy Calhoun	1999
Bernie McInerney	Will Vernon	1977
Chris McKenna	Joey Buchanan	1990–93
Kate McKeown	Irene Manning	1978, 1987
Regan McManus	Kristine Karr	1981–83
Stephen Meadows	Patrick London	1986–87
Colm Meaney	Alf	1987–88
Ken Meeker	Rafe Garretson	1980–91
Tracy Melchior	Kelly Cramer	2003
Morgan K. Melis	Kevin Buchanan	1976–81
Sylvia Miles	Stella Lipschitz	2002–03
Allan Miller	Dave Siegel	1968–72
Robert Milli	Jim Craig	1968–69
Alicia Minshew	Kendall Hart	2004–05
Susan Misner	Grace Davidson	1999
Kelley Missal	Danielle Manning	2009–13
Donald Moffat	Marcus Polk	1968–69
Wendy Moniz	Kathleen Finn	2011
Robert Montano	Antonio Vega	2007
Julia Montgomery	Samantha Vernon	1976–81, 1987
Haviland Morris	Claire Baxter	2001–03
Jessica Morris	Jen Rappaport	2001–05, 2008
Mari Morrow	Rachel Gannon	1995–96
Ryan Morris	Joey Buchanan	1980–85
Burke Moses	Bulge Hackman	1992–94
Burke Moses	Calvin Jenkins	2008
Sean Moynihan	Powell Lord III	1992–94, 2009
Alan Muraoka	Mr. Pravat	2006
Mary Gordon Murray	Becky Lee Abbott	1979–86, 1988, 1996, 1998, 2001
Alexandra Neil	Paige Miller	2006–07
Novella Nelson	Judge Barbara Fitzwater	1997
Barbara Niven	Liz Reynolds	2002–03
Agnes Nixon	Agnes Dixon	2008, 2012
James Noble	Dr. Morris	1976
Leonie Norton	Julie Siegel Toland	1974–76
Amber Skye Noyes	Michelle McCall	2013
Tyler Noyes	C.J. Roberts	1992–97
Aidan and Liam O'Donnell	AJ Chandler	2004–05
Nicole Orth-Pallavicini	Melinda Cramer	1997, 2004
James O'Sullivan	Pete O'Neill	1985–87
Erika Page	Roseanne Delgado	1998–2001
Michael Palance	Daniel Wolek	1989–91
Hayden Panettiere	Sarah Roberts	1994–97
Connor Paolo	Travis O'Connell	2004
Jameson Parker	Brad Vernon	1976–78
Lara Parker	Carol Phipps	1985
Dennis Parlato	Michael Grande	1988-1990
Peter Parros	Ben Price	1994–95
Vincent Pastore	Arthur 'Rack 'em up' Ross	2003-04
Lee Patterson	Joe Riley	1968–70, 1972–79, 1987
Lee Patterson	Tom Dennison	1986–88
Pamela Payton-Wright	Addie Cramer	1991–99, 2001–05, 2007–12
Patricia Pearcy	Melinda Cramer	1973–74
Austin Peck	Rick Powers	2011–12
Christian Pedersen	Frank Baker	2013
Lisa Peluso	Billie Giordano	1987–88
Lisa Peluso	Gina Russo	2001
Valarie Pettiford	Sheila Price	1990–94
Ryan Phillippe	Billy Douglas	1992–94
Grace Phillips	Sarah Gordon	1991–92
Mark Philpot	Jamie Sanders	1986–89
Nancy Pinkerton	Dorian Lord	1973–77
Lenny Platt	Nate Salinger	2010–12
Nat Polen	Jim Craig	1969–81
Jeff Pomerantz	Peter Janssen	1976–79, 1987
Matthew & Michael Pra	Steven Holden Jr.	1989-91
Wendee Pratt	Andy Harrison	1994–97
Elaine Princi	Dorian Lord	1990–93
Nicholas Pryor	Anthony Makana	1983
Nathan Purdee	Hank Gannon	1992–2003, 2009
Ron Raines	Carl Peterson	2013
Kirk and Robert Raisch	Al Holden	1988–90
Meghan Rayder	Starr Manning	1998
Luke Reilly	Richard Abbott	1977–79
Portia Reiners	Britney Jennings	2006–07
George Reinholt	Tony Lord	1975–77
Barbara Rhoades	Irene Manning	2011
Eden Riegel	Bianca Montgomery	2004–05
Richard Riehle	Big Jake	1988
Sean Ringgold	Shaun Evans	2006–13
Clint Ritchie	Clint Buchanan	1979–99, 2003–04
Chita Rivera	Melody Rambo	1982
Finn Robbins	Liam McBain	2013
Michelle Robinson	Prison Matron	2002–03
Nic Robuck	James Ford	2010–12
Patricia Roe	Eileen Riley Siegel	1968–72
Elisabeth Röhm	Dorothy Hayes	1997–98
Natacha Roi	Eugenia Randolph Lord	1994–95
Michael Roman	Al Holden	1993–94
Brandon Routh	Seth Anderson	2001–02
John Rue	Moe Stubbs	2007–09, 2011
John Rue	Jeremiah Stubbs	2008
Amber Ryan	Emily MacIver	2002–03
Byron Sanders	Talbot Huddleston	1977–79
Sonia Satra	Barbara Graham	1998–99
Paul Satterfield	Spencer Truman	2005–07
Sherri Saum	Keri Reynolds	2001–03
Saundra Santiago	Isabella Santi	2004
Saundra Santiago	Carlotta Vega	2009–11
Rebecca Schaeffer	Annie Barnes	1985
Marnie Schulenburg	Jo Sullivan	2013
Jason-Shane Scott	Will Rappaport	1998–2001, 2003, 2005, 2007
Thurman Scott	Price Trainor	1968
Paolo Seganti	Arturo Bandini	2013
Marian Seldes	Sonya Roskova Cramer	1997–98
Amanda Setton	Kimberly Andrews	2009–11
Ian Chandler Sheaffer	Matthew Buchanan	2000–01
Madeleine Sherwood	Bridget Leander	1980
John Wesley Shipp	Blanchard Lovelace	1989
John Wesley Shipp	Eddie Ford	2010–12
Tari Signor	Margaret Cochran	2004–06, 2008
Sabine Singh	Wendy	2010
Erika Slezak	Victoria Lord	1971–2013
Erika Slezak	Virginia Fletcher	1988
Erika Slezak	Herself	2008
Walter Slezak	Lazlo Braedecker	1974
Alex and Brittany Smith	Jessica Buchanan	1988–89
Hillary B. Smith	Nora Hanen Buchanan	1992–2013
Lois Smith	DuAnn Demerest	1990
Lois Smith	Betsy Cramer	2003–04
Louise Sorel	Judith Russell Sanders	1986–87
Gillian Spencer	Victoria Lord	1968–70
Kevin Spirtas	Jonas Chamberlain	2008
Trevor St. John	Walker "Flynn" Laurence	2003
Trevor St. John	Victor Lord, Jr.	2003–13
Chris Stack	Michael McBain	2007–09, 2011
Kevin Stapleton	Kevin Buchanan	1996–98
Frances Sternhagen	Judge	1985
Timothy D. Stickney	R.J. Gannon	1994–2009
Jim Storm	Larry Wolek	1968
Michael Storm	Larry Wolek	1969–2004
Robin Strasser	Dorian Lord	1979–87, 1993–2000, 2003–11, 2013
Anna Stuart	Rae Cummings	2002
Tika Sumpter	Layla Williamson	2005–11
Michael Swan	John Carpenter	1996–97
Nancy Snyder	Katrina Karr	1979–83
Millee Taggart	Millee Parks	1969–70
Jason Tam	Markko Rivera	2007–12
Krista Tesreau	Tina Lord	1994–97
Roy Thinnes	Alex Coronal	1984–85
Roy Thinnes	Sloan Carpenter	1992–95
Linda Thorson	Julia Medina	1989–92
Joey Thrower	Kevin Buchanan	1991–92
Terrell Tilford	Greg Evans	2009–10
Michael Tipps	Al Holden	2001
Gina Tognoni	Kelly Cramer	1995–2002, 2010–11
Heather Tom	Kelly Cramer	2003–06
Erin Torpey	Jessica Buchanan	1990–2003
Erin Torpey	Megan Buchanan	2008
Erin Torpey	Erin	2011
Steven and Nicholas Towler	Matthew Buchanan	1999–2000
Ty Treadway	Colin MacIver	2000–01, 2008
Ty Treadway	Troy MacIver	2001–04, 2012
Shenaz Treasury	Rama Patel	2011–13
Andrew Trischitta	Jack Manning	2011–13
Tobias Truvillion	Vincent Jones	2006–08
Jessica Tuck	Megan Gordon	1988–93, 1999, 2004, 2012
Paul Tulley	Larry Wolek	1968
Blair Underwood	Bobby Blue	1985–86
Brittany Underwood	Langston Wilde	2006–12
Trish Van Devere	Meredith Lord	1968
Casper Van Dien	Ty Moody	1993–94
Mario Van Peebles	Doc Gilmore	1982–83
Jerry verDorn	Clint Buchanan	2005–13
Mathew Vipond	Kevin Buchanan	1990–91
John Viscardi	Father Tony	1990-91
Nana Visitor	Georgina Whitman	1982
Darlene Vogel	Melanie MacIver	2000–01
Jill Voight	Becky Lee Abbott	1977–78
Nicholas Walker	Max Holden	1990–91
Tonja Walker	Alex Olanov	1990–97, 2001–02, 2007, 2009, 2011
Jessica Walter	Eleanor Armitage	1996–97
Mary Ward	Diane Bristol	1986–87
Billy Warlock	Ross Rayburn	2010
Lee Warrick	Julie Siegel Toland	1969–74
Craig Wasson	Doug Ebert	1991
Tuc Watkins	David Vickers Buchanan	1994–96, 2001–13
Kellie Waymire	Emily Haynes	1993–94
Ann Wedgeworth	Charlie Barnes	1985
Bridget White	Olivia/Cameron Wallace	1996–97
Charles Malik Whitfield	Ben Price	1993–94
Jay Wilkison	Riley Colson	2003–05
Austin Williams	Shane Morasco	2007–12
Austin Williams	Spencer Truman	2008
Nafessa Williams	Deanna Forbes	2011
Stephanie Williams	Sheila Price	1994–96
Bree Williamson	Jessica Buchanan	2003–12
Karen Witter	Tina Lord	1990–94
Peggy Wood	Kate Nolan	1969
Robert S. Woods	Bo Buchanan	1979–86, 1988–2013
Robert S. Woods	Patrick London	1988
Robert S. Woods	Asa Buchanan	2008
Tanner Woods	Bo Buchanan	2008
Shanelle Workman	Sarah Roberts	2003–04
Jacob Young	JR Chandler	2005
Janet Zarish	Lee Halpern	1987–88, 2008–09
Michael Zaslow	David Renaldi	1983–86, 1997–98
Jacklyn Zeman	Lana McClain	1976–77
Kim Zimmer	Bonnie Harmon	1978
Kim Zimmer	Echo DiSavoy	1983, 2010–11
Henry Zittel	Murray Zittel	2010

== Celebrity guests ==
Guest	Year
Joyce Brothers	1972
Sammy Davis Jr.	1979
Peabo Bryson	1985
Beach Boys	1988
Bill Anderson	1980s
Hugh Downs	1980s
Ivana Trump	1991
Kurtis Blow	1991
Dr. Ruth	1992
Reba McEntire	1992
Eileen Heckart	1992
Robin Leach	1992
Bill Medley	1994
Darlene Love	1994
Marsha Mason	1994
Roberta Peters	1982
Gene Rayburn	1970s
Little Richard	1995
Hazel Scott	1973

Guest	Year
The Chieftains	1996
Robert Vaughn	1996
Erykah Badu	1997
Frank McCourt	1990s
Jeremy Roenick	2000
Chris Therien	2000
Sheldon Souray	2000
Kevin Weekes	2000
Scott Gomez	2000
Betty Rollin	2000
Kortney Kayle	2001
Charles Busch	2001
Paul Taylor	2004
Simply Red	2004
Jai Rodriguez	2005
Mary J. Blige	2006, 2008
Desiree Casado	2006
Marysol Castro	2006
Lifehouse	2006, 2010

Guest	Year
Jeannie Ortega	2006
Nelly Furtado	2007
Joy Behar	2007
Elisabeth Hasselbeck	2007
Timbaland	2007
Keri Hilson	2007
OneRepublic	2007
Michelle Veintimilla	2007
Snoop Dogg	2008, 2013
Puddle of Mudd	2008
Plain White T's	2009
Rachael Yamagata	2009
The Pussycat Dolls	2009
Lionel Richie	2009
Frankie Negrón	2009
The All-American Rejects	2009
Wendy Williams	2011
Kourtney Kardashian	2011
