= Richard Abbott (One Life to Live) =

- One Life to Live character
- Portrayed by: Luke Reilly (1977–79); Keith Langsdale (1980); Robert Gribbon (1980–81); Jeffrey Byron (1986–87)
- Duration: 1977–81; 1986–87
- First appearance: January 1977
- Last appearance: January 1987
- Created by: Gordon Russell
- Introduced by: Doris Quinlan; Paul Rauch (1986)
In-universe information
- Occupation: Journalist; Businessman
- Family: Lord
- Parents: Jonathan Abbott; Gwendolyn Lord Abbott
- Spouse: Becky Lee Hunt (1978–81)
- Uncles: Victor Lord; Clayton-Powell Lord, Sr.
- First cousins: Tony Lord; Victoria Lord; Meredith Lord; Tina Lord; Todd Manning; Victor Lord, Jr.; Clayton-Powell Lord II
- Other relatives: Powell Lord III

Richard Abbott is a fictional character on the American soap opera One Life to Live. The role was originated in January 1977 by actor Luke Reilly. The nephew of Victor Lord and first cousin to Victoria Lord, the role last appears in January 1987 portrayed by actor Jeffrey Byron.

== Casting ==
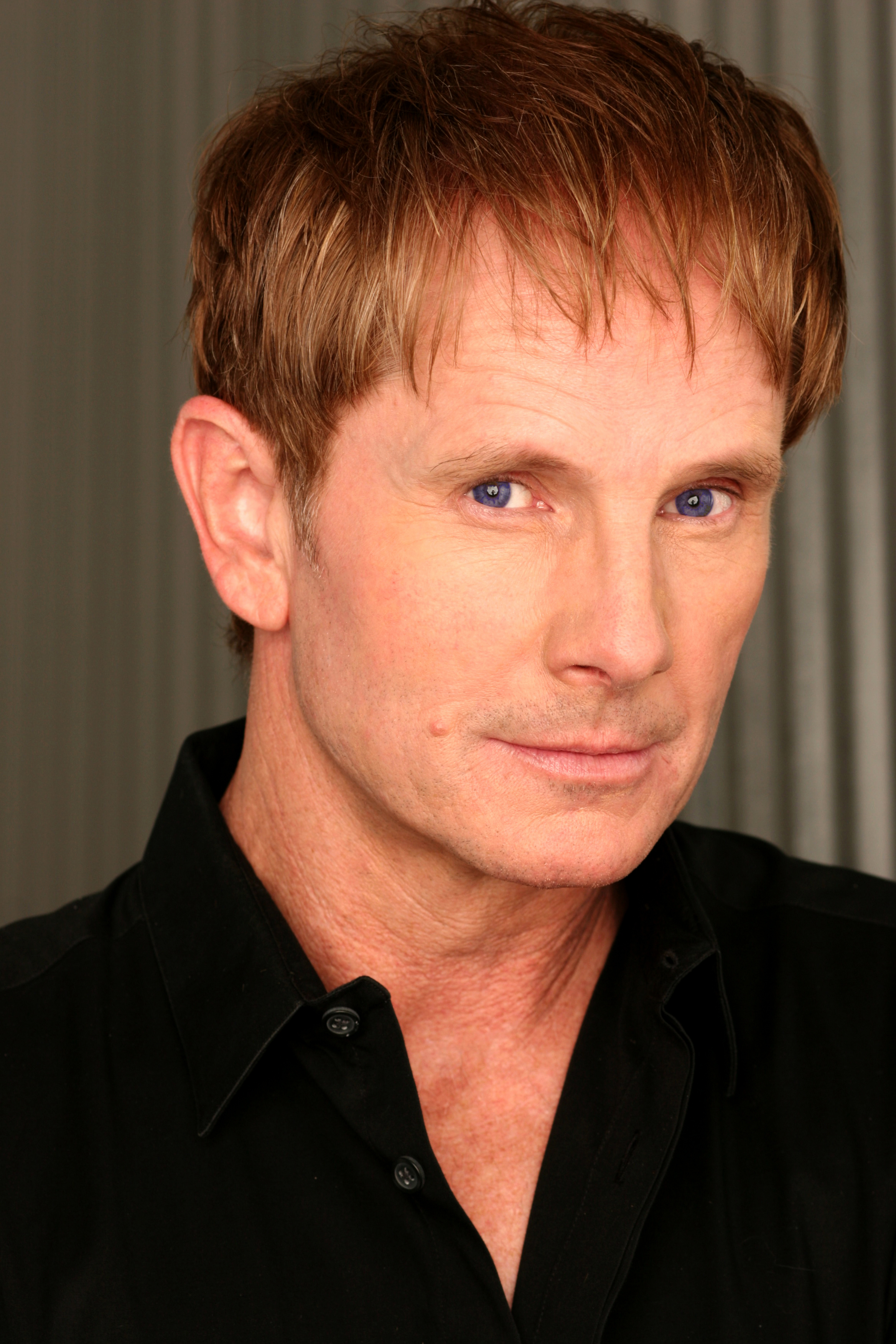
Actor Jeffrey Byron was the last actor recast to play Richard Abbott in 1986.

Luke Reilly originated the role of Victor Lord's nephew Richard Abbott onscreen January 1977, and played the role through 1979. Robert S. Woods originally auditioned for the recast of Richard with One Life to Live executive producer Joseph Stuart and opposite fictional cousin Victoria Lord Riley (Erika Slezak). Stuart cast Woods to play new character and featured protagonist Bo Buchanan, and Richard was played by newcomer Keith Langsdale. Langsdale first appeared onscreen in February 1980, fired from the show in April and replaced with Robert Gribbon in episodes beginning June 1980. Gribbon went on to play Richard continually through 1981. In January 1986, actor Jeffrey Byron assumed the role and last appeared in 1987.

== Character development ==
Introduced as the charming son of Victor Lord's sister, Gwendolyn Lord Abbott (Joan Copeland), Richard (Reilly) comes to Llanview and soon begins work with cousin Viki Lord Riley (Erika Slezak) in the Lord family-owned newspaper The Banner. Becky Lee Hunt (Jill Voight) arrives in Llanview soon afterward in pursuit of a country music career, falling in love with wealthy Richard. Dorian Lord (Claire Malis, Robin Strasser) and Edwina Lewis (Margaret Klenck) both pursue Richard, but he proposes marriage to Becky Lee.

A jealous Edwina travels to Becky Lee's native North Carolina and finds of she's already married. Edwina returns to Llanview with Becky Lee's estranged husband Luke Jackson (Marshall Borden). Meanwhile, Richard and Becky Lee marry onscreen November 7, 1978. Viki's husband and Banner editor-in-chief Joe Riley (Lee Patterson) then offers Richard a job managing the newspaper's European bureau in Paris. Before leaving town, Richard's skull is fractured in a fight with Luke in October 1979. Luke is later killed in a shootout with Llanview Police Captain Ed Hall (Al Freeman Jr.). Richard undergoes major brain surgery and soon leaves town with his new wife.

The married couple returns to Llanview in February 1980, with Richard (Keith Langsdale) and Becky Lee's (Mary Gordon Murray) falling apart. Richard enlists reformed prostitute Karen Wolek (Judith Light) to investigate Becky Lee's escapades. Karen finds out Richard is cuckolded by Tina Clayton's (Andrea Evans) ex-boyfriend Johnny Drummond (Wayne Massey). Richard divorces Becky Lee and returns to Paris in September 1981.

A debonair Richard (Jeffrey Byron) comes back to Llanview in January 1986 and becomes romantically involved with newly discovered cousin Tina, who assumes the last name of her estranged father Victor Lord. After proposing marriage, Tina accepts in June 1986, but backs out of the engagement to court Cord Roberts (John Loprieno).
