= Ed Hall (One Life to Live) =

- One Life to Live character
- Portrayed by: Al Freeman Jr.^{1} David Pendleton
- Duration: 1972–88; 2000
- First appearance: January 1972
- Last appearance: April 7, 2000
- Created by: Agnes Nixon
- Introduced by: Doris Quinlan; Jill Farren Phelps (2000)
In-universe information
- Occupation: Police officer; Politician
- Brothers: Gus Hall
- Spouse: Carla Gray (1974–79)
- Adoptive sons: Josh Hall
- Grandsons: Jared Hall (adoptive)

Ed Hall is a fictional character from the American soap opera One Life to Live, played by Al Freeman Jr.

== Casting and reception ==
The role was originated and played by actor Al Freeman Jr. from January 1972 until 1987, with a brief interruption in 1975. In the process, he earned a Daytime Emmy Award for Outstanding Lead Actor in a Drama Series in 1979, becoming the first actor from the show as well as the first African American to earn the award. Freeman later earned nominations in the category of Outstanding Supporting Actor in 1986 and 1987. The actor briefly reprised the role in 1988 and 2000.

== Storylines ==
=== 1972–74 ===
Freeman first appears in the role of Lieutenant Hall in January 1972 when Hall begins to lead an investigation into the murder of Marcy Wade (Francesca James), a secretary for the Lord family newspaper, The Banner. For the previous year, Marcy masqueraded around Llanview as "Niki Smith", the alter-ego and symptom of publishing heiress Viki Lord Riley's (Erika Slezak) dissociative identity disorder, hoping to create a rift in the budding relationship between Viki and new executive editor Steve Burke (Bernard Grant). Later in a hostage situation that involves Steve, Marcy holds Vinny Wolek (Antony Ponzini) hostage. Steve struggles with Marcy for the gun and accidentally, but fatally, wounds her. Though Steve vows he did not murder her, Lt. Hall develops a theory that Steve and Marcy were carrying on an illicit affair without Viki's knowledge, and when Marcy was to tell Viki that Steve killed her. Steve is indicted and charged with first-degree murder. Steve's conviction is only halted for the Only Marcy’s purse, containing an incriminating note saying that Niki Smith planned to kill Vince Wolek, could save him. Steve is later exonerated when a presumed dead Joe Riley (Lee Patterson) reappears possessing Marcy Wade's purse. In his downtime after the investigation, Ed Hall courts Carla Gray (Ellen Holly).

Supercouple Ed (Freeman) and Carla (Holly), c. 1976

In 1973, siblings-in-law Meredith Lord Wolek (Lynn Benesch) and Vinny, and baby Daniel Wolek were taken hostage by thieves in the Llanfair carriage house. During hostage negotiations with Ed, the burglars demand the Llanview Police Department arrange for a plane to transport them to South America, where they would later release the hostages. One of the criminals shoots the other. Meredith attempts to escape and is fatally injured after falling on her head against the edge of a table. The other robber is killed by the Llanview Police while attempting to escape, and Vince and Daniel escape alive. Lieutenant Hall makes a great impression on Carla, causing her to end her budding romance with politico Bert Skelly. Meanwhile, Ed mentors downtrodden youth Joshua "Josh" West (Laurence Fishburne). Ed would later propose marriage, and although Carla was enamored with Ed's integrity and his devotion toward the mentorship of Josh, Carla fell deeper in love with Ed, but grew troubled with the prospect of being in a relationship with the life-threatening work of law enforcement. Unable to ignore her feelings, she accepts his proposal in March 1973. Ed and Carla adopt Josh together in April 1974.

When the wedding date approaches, family members of Ed and Carla began receiving anonymous threats. Carla feels her life threatened when her car brakes are cut, and their now-adoptive son Josh is informed he would be retaliated against for the death of the victim of a Llanview murder investigation. Vince discovers the veiled threats are from a recently released mental institution patient named Lester Brock. Before word can get out, Lester calls Carla, telling her Ed wants to meet her at the jewelry store that afternoon. Unknown to Carla, she goes to the jewelry store, where she is almost shot at, save for the quick action of Joe Riley (Lee Patterson). After the ruckus, Ed, Vince, and other Llanview officers arrive at the scene, arresting Lester. Following the trying travail, Ed and Carla continue with their plans to marry. On October 5, 1974, Ed and Carla marry with Josh as Ed's best man and real-life jazz singer Hazel Scott as Carla's aunt and maid of honor in the first on-screen wedding of Black characters on soap operas.

=== 1979–85 ===
Ed is shot during a police altercation in 1979 by the estranged redneck husband of Becky Lee Abbott (Mary Gordon Murray), Luke Johnson. Luke was quickly apprehended and Ed rushed to Llanview Hospital, where the Lieutenant is operated on by newly arrived surgeon Dr. Jack Scott (Arthur Burghardt). Following hours of being in critical condition, Dr. Scott removes the bullet from a wound near Ed's heart. An overly grateful Carla falls in love with Dr. Jack as Ed's focused less attention on her at the height of the Marco Dane (Gerald Anthony) murder trial involving Karen Wolek (Judith Light). Ed was promoted to police captain, but not long afterwards Carla requests a divorce in 1979 to marry the surgeon who saved Ed's life, to which he concedes. Later, social climber and Llanview District Attorney Herb Callison runs as the fictional governor of Pennsylvania with Captain Hall as his running mate in 1980. In exchange for the manipulation of the election, undiscovered to Ed, Herb and fiancée Dr. Dorian Cramer Lord each obtain illegal campaign contributions from Asa Buchanan (Philip Carey). In January 1981, Ed uncovers the illegality in the election of Herb, the day he is to serve as a groomsman for Herb at his wedding. Herb and Ed are sworn-in as Governor and Lieutenant Governor of Pennsylvania, respectively, in February 1981. Soon afterwards, news of the political impropriety of Governor and First Lady Callison is revealed in the news, to the shame of Ed who resigns in the midst of the scandal. Herb soon follows, and with Ed's career ruined, he proceeded to pick up the pieces of his shattered life.

Assuming work as a private investigator, Ed acquires a steady clientele of work. When the assumed father of the ward of Viki Lord, Tina Clayton (Andrea Evans) escapes from jail, he arrives in Llanview in search of Tina. Now a con artist, Ted seeks a way to gain the Lord family fortune by getting back into the good graces of Tina, who grew weary of her estranged father's attempts at bonding. Unsuccessful at getting Tina to regard him, Ted dons a wig and follows Tina to an art gallery. Attempting to seriously harm Tina, Ed shoots and kills the disguised Ted after it is uncovered that he killed now-Llanview Police Lieutenant Vince Wolek. Ed is rehired by the Llanview Police Department later that year. In 1982, the rapist of Karen Wolek, deranged Dr. Ivan Kipling, implants brain chips into the heads of Karen's ex-husband Dr. Larry Wolek (Michael Storm) and later Ed, hoping to manipulate the two men and kidnap to South America. Dr. Kipling's caper was foiled when the chips were removed from Ed and Larry's heads and Karen rescued.

Freeman was fired from the series in 1987 by OLTL executive producer Paul Rauch, following in a series of administrative moves by Rauch which ultimately removed regular African American cast members. Leading black cast members would be absent from the series until new executive producer Linda Gottlieb and headwriter Michael Malone introduced Hank Gannon, played by actor Nathan Purdee, in 1992. Freeman briefly reprised in the role in 1988 and 2000.

== Reception ==
In 2020, Candace Young and Charlie Mason from Soaps She Knows put Ed and Carla on their list of Daytime's Most Important African-American Characters, commenting "A lightning rod of a character, Ellen Holly's alter ego shocked viewers when she started dating a Black man, then shocked them again when it was revealed that she, too, was Black. Eventually, she settled down with the beloved Llanview PD detective who was played by daytime's first Black Outstanding Lead Actor Emmy winner, Al Freeman Jr."
