= Irene Manning (One Life to Live) =

- One Life to Live character
- Barbara Rhoades as Irene Manning
- Portrayed by: Kate McKeown (1978, 1987); Andrea Evans (1985); Diana Lamar (1994–95); Barbara Rhoades (2011)
- Duration: 1978, 1985, 1987, 1994–95, 2011
- First appearance: May 27, 1978
- Last appearance: November 10, 2011
- Created by: Gordon Russell
- Introduced by: Joseph Stuart (1978); Paul Rauch (1987); Linda Gottlieb (1994); Frank Valentini (2011)
- Kate McKeown as Irene Manning
In-universe information
- Other names: Irene Lord; Irene Clayton
- Occupation: Secret agent for the CIA
- Father: Albert Manning
- Husband: Victor Lord (1960s); Ted Clayton (until 1978)
- Children: Tina Lord; Todd Manning; Victor Lord, Jr.
- Grandchildren: C. J. Roberts; Sarah Roberts; Starr Manning; Danielle Manning; Jack Manning; Sam Manning
- First cousins: Peter Manning; Martha Manning

Irene Manning is a fictional character from the ABC soap opera One Life to Live.

== Casting ==
The character first appears in the episode dated May 27, 1978, originated by the actress Kate McKeown. In 1985, Andrea Evans (who played Irene's daughter, Tina Lord) portrayed Irene in flashbacks. McKeown reprised the role in 1987. Diana Lamar appeared in flashbacks as Irene from 1994 to 1995. Barbara Rhoades appeared as a back-from-the-dead Irene on the episode dated August 9, 2011, last appearing in a vision on November 10, 2011.

== Storylines ==
=== 1978–1981 ===
Irene Clayton (Kate McKeown) is introduced on-screen in fictional Llanview, Pennsylvania, on the episode first-run May 27, 1978. The former best friend and college roommate of central heroine Victoria Lord (Erika Slezak), she arrives asking Viki to permanently adopt her 16-year-old daughter, Tina Clayton (Andrea Evans), as she is ostensibly dying from terminal cancer. Soon on her deathbed, Viki promises Irene to take care of Tina, and Irene apparently succumbs to the illness on-screen in July 1978. Soon later, her legal widower Ted Clayton arrives in Llanview in 1980 hoping to con assumed daughter Tina and her adoptive mother Viki out a portion of the Lord family fortune. When Ted's plans are foiled by Tina, he goes on a killing spree, murdering Vinny Wolek before he-himself is killed by police officer Ed Hall (Al Freeman, Jr.) in 1981.

=== 1984–85 ===
After leaving town, Tina returns to Llanview in 1984 with Irene's diary, which reveals that Ted Clayton was not her biological father. In 1985, when Tina learns that Viki's father, Victor Lord, and her mother were married, she freezes the assets of Victor's widow, Dorian Lord (Robin Strasser), and Dorian's marriage to Victor is declared invalid (although, it is later revealed that Victor and Irene were divorced years before he and Dorian were married, making the latter marriage legal). Later, Tina discovers a secret room beneath the Lord estate, Llanfair, and finds a letter from Victor meant to be delivered to Viki. In the letter, Victor Lord admits to having an affair with Irene and even marrying her. The letter further reveals that he knew that he was Tina's real father prior to his apparent 1976 death. A stunned Viki initially thinks the revelation and letter to be a farce, suffering a brief bout with her multiple personalities. When she recovers, Viki recalls a repressed memory of Victor and Irene in bed together and welcomes Tina into her family as her sister.

=== 1994–95 ===
In 1994, Dorian Lord is criminally charged with the 1976 murder of then-husband Victor Lord, an assumption many in Llanview held since The Banner founder's apparent demise. After Dorian is convicted and sentenced to death, conman David Vickers (Tuc Watkins) arrives in town with another copy of Irene's diary, which reveals a confession from Irene of having smothered Victor to death. David forges the parts of the diary in a scheme to get his hands on the Lord family male inheritance, posing as the secret son of Victor and Irene. Diary entries from Irene reveal she and Victor continued an affair after their divorce, and that she had given birth to his son. David Vickers claims to be that son, seeing a way of getting a piece of Viki's family fortune.

In December 1994, Todd Manning (Roger Howarth) finds a letter, following the death of his apparent father, Peter Manning. The letter, written by his then-deceased apparent mother, Barbara "Bitsy" Jones Manning, reveals that Todd is adopted, and Peter to be Irene's cousin. As the son of Victor, Todd is now entitled to $30 million (1995) inheritance.

=== 2011 ===
In the summer of 2011, a man with Todd's original face (Howarth) shows up in Llanview, claiming that the man who everyone has believed to be Todd (Trevor St. John) for the past eight years is an imposter. After a DNA test is conducted, it is learned that both men share identical genetic makeup. Attempting to explain how the two men could share the same DNA, Victor and Irene's granddaughter, Starr, believes the two men might be twins. A very-much-alive Irene reappears in August 2011 at Llanfair, eventually admitting to Viki and Lord family relatives that the two men were, in fact, twins, and that the man who claimed to be Todd Manning from 2003 through 2011 was actually born Victor Lord, Jr.

Irene set a bomb on the estate to kill Todd's (Howarth) family unless Todd gives Irene an unknown microchip that she needed. Todd convinces Starr to help him escape and they make it to house in time to warn everyone about Irene's threats. Todd remembers where the microchip Irene is after is hidden and runs off to meet with her. Meanwhile, Bo Buchanan (Robert S. Woods) comes to arrest Todd and Starr, Bo discovers the bomb and gets rid of it in time to save himself and the rest of the Lord/Manning clan. After Todd throws the microchip into the river, Irene shoots him and leads him to believe that his family has died in the explosion. On the episode first run October 3, Todd shoots and kills Irene.

It is revealed when Todd Manning crosses over in-continuity on soap opera General Hospital that after Todd is charged and prosecuted by Llanview District Attorney Nora Buchanan, he is acquitted of his mother's killing because of emotional duress suffered in an episode of post traumatic stress disorder when Irene lied about having killed his relatives.
