= Tina Lord =

- One Life to Live character
- Andrea Evans as Tina Lord (2008)
- Portrayed by: Andrea Evans (1978–1981, 1985–1990, 2008–2011); Kelli Maroney (1984); Marsha Clark (1984–1985); Nancy Frangione (1985); Karen Witter (1990–1994); Krista Tesreau (1994–1997)
- Duration: 1978–1981; 1984–1997; 2008; 2011
- First appearance: July 2, 1978
- Last appearance: November 15, 2011
- Created by: Gordon Russell
- Introduced by: Joseph Stuart; Paul Rauch (1984); Frank Valentini (2008, 2011)
In-universe information
- Other names: Tina Clayton; Tina Roberts; Jane Black; Tina Rogan; Tina Vickers
- Occupation: Socialite; Trustee to the Lord family estate; Crown Princess; Personal shopper; Interior designer
- Family: Lord
- Father: Victor Lord
- Mother: Irene Manning Lord
- Stepfather: Ted Clayton
- Brothers: Todd Manning; Victor Lord, Jr.
- Half-brothers: Tony Lord
- Half-sisters: Victoria Lord; Meredith Lord
- Husband: Cord Roberts (1986–1994, 2011–present) (Note: The first ceremony for Cord and Tina was in 1986. They divorced for the first time in 1987. The second marriage between them took place between 1987–1988, and the couple re-married in 1988 until their divorced in 1990. The couple remarried in 1991 and divorced again in 1993. However, they were married consecutively from 1986 to 1994.); Cain Rogan (1993); David Vickers (1995)
- Children: C. J. Roberts; Sarah Roberts
- Grandparents: Albert Manning
- Aunts and uncles: Powell Lord I; Gwendolyn Lord Abbott
- Nieces and nephews: Megan Gordon; Daniel Wolek; Brian Kendall; Kevin Buchanan; Joey Buchanan; Jessica Buchanan; Natalie Buchanan; Starr Manning; Danielle Manning; Jack Manning; Sam Manning
- First cousins: Clayton-Powell Lord II; Richard Abbott

Tina Lord Roberts is a fictional character from the American daytime soap opera One Life to Live, originally and last played by Andrea Evans. The character is the daughter of original series patriarch Victor Lord, and sister to long-running characters Victoria Lord and Todd Manning.

== Casting and popularity ==
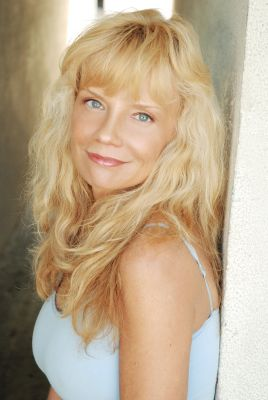
Kelli Maroney played Tina Lord in 1984.

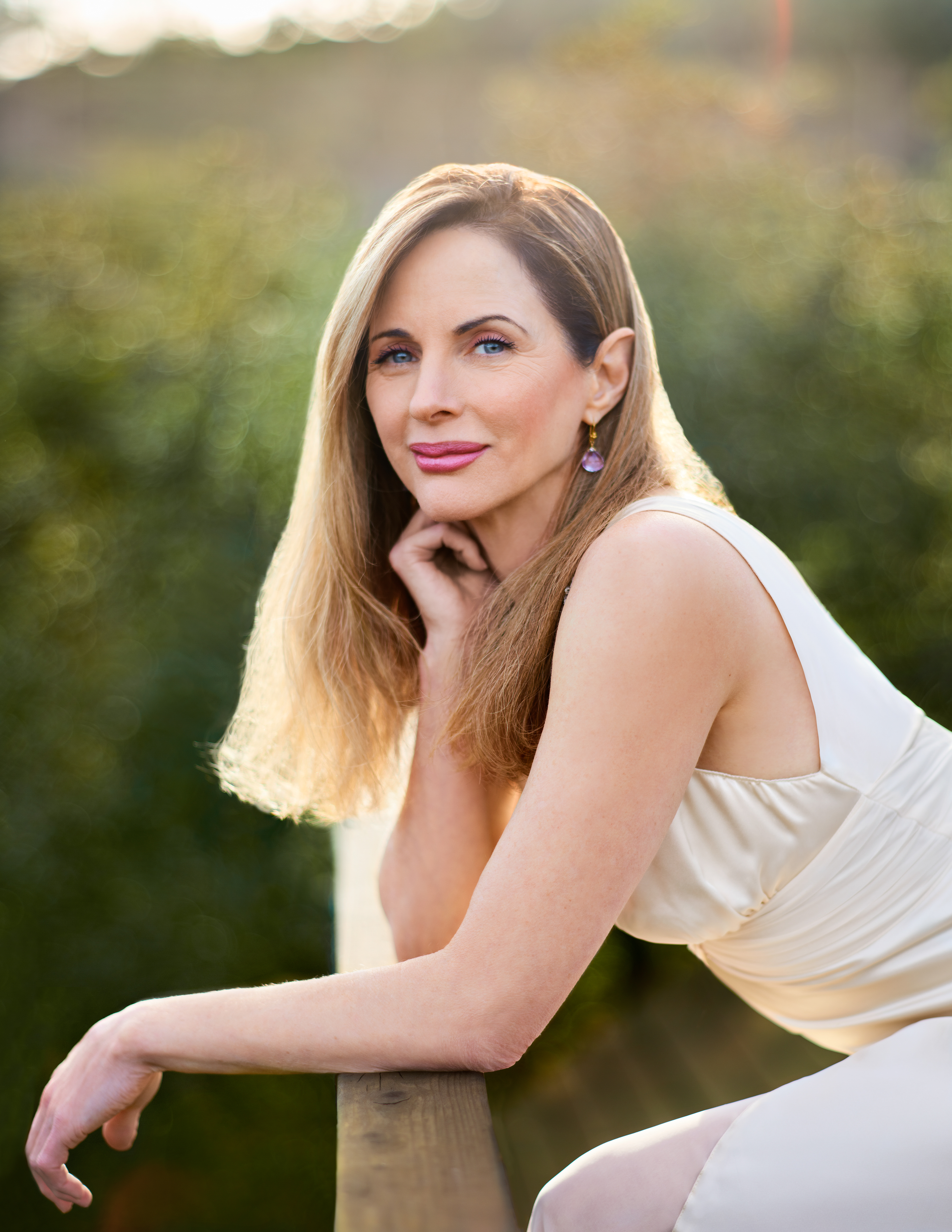
Karen Witter played Tina Lord from 1990 to 1994.

=== 1978–1990 ===
The role was originated in 1978 by actress Andrea Evans, whose first stint lasted until 1981. The character was recast with Kelli Maroney in 1984 and then with Marsha Clark from 1984 to 1985. Evans returned in 1985 in a storyline credited with putting the series "back on course" and ultimately bringing Tina to her height of popularity. In July 1985, Nancy Frangione stepped into the role for two days while Evans was ill. Evans appeared on the cover of Soap Opera Digest five times—once every year from 1986 to 1990—and People magazine called her "Daytime's Diva of Dirt" in 1985. The series itself rose from #5 in the Nielsen ratings in the 1984–1985 season to #4 in the following season, soon going to #3 the next year, where it remained until the 1989–1990 season. In 1985, then-Executive Producer Paul Rauch noted of Evans, "She makes a tremendous difference to our show ... Her ability makes her go beyond the ordinary viper. In large part, she's responsible for the show's recent success." In 1988, Evans was nominated for a Daytime Emmy Award for Outstanding Ingenue for the role. Though "mega-popular" as Tina, Evans abruptly left the series on January 18, 1990. In 1993, Evans revealed she had left the series and the public eye because of a persistent stalker.

=== 1990s recasts ===
Tina was recast with former Playboy Playmate Karen Witter in 1990. The casting search to replace Evans was "one of the most expansive in soap history", and Witter beat out over 300 other hopefuls for the role. She had not watched One Life to Live or known Evans' popularity as Tina until she got the part. Witter's first airdate was May 10, 1990. Soap opera journalist Connie Passalacqua wrote that Witter represented "a more bearable Tina", and that her casting "added an actress with considerable dimension to the soap opera scene". Witter appeared on the August 14, 1990 cover of Soap Opera Weekly with co-star John Loprieno (who portrayed Tina's husband Cord Roberts), the February 5, 1991, and July 6, 1993, covers of Soap Opera Digest, and the July 28, 1992 cover of Soap Opera Magazine. In 1991, she was nominated for a Soap Opera Digest Award for Outstanding Female Newcomer. Witter played Tina for four years, until February 14, 1994.

Witter was succeeded in the role on July 6, 1994 by Krista Tesreau, known for her Daytime Emmy-nominated portrayal of "Tina twin" Mindy Lewis on CBS' Guiding Light from 1983 to 1989. Tina was written off the show on June 12, 1996. Tesreau reappeared briefly in September and on December 24, 1996, and finally from January 21 to January 24, 1997, to facilitate the departure of John Loprieno.

=== Evans' returns ===
Over a decade later, ABC announced in April 2008 that Evans would soon return as Tina. She reappeared onscreen on June 11, 2008. Executive Producer Frank Valentini noted, "Even though Andrea has not appeared on OLTL since 1990, she has remained among the most requested characters to return to the show ... I welcome her home to OLTL and to the role where she made an indelible mark on our audience."

One Life to Live celebrated its 40th anniversary in July 2008 with the return of several former cast members and by revisiting notable plotlines from its past. The series paid tribute to Tina's famous 1987 plunge over the Iguazu Falls in a storyline in which villain Carlo Hesser sends her daughter Sarah over a waterfall as well. Evans' imminent departure from the series was announced on November 5, 2008. Both Evans and ABC noted that the actress' return was always set to be short-term, as her "life, family and home" are in California while One Life to Live tapes in New York City. Valentini continued in a statement, "The character of Tina is a very important part of the OLTL canvas ... [If] there is an opportunity to have her — Tina and Andrea — return at a future date, the show would be happy to explore it." Evans added, "I had a fabulous time bringing Tina back to the show and certainly hope that the chance to take on the role manifests itself again." Her last appearance was on November 25, 2008.

On July 21, 2011, it was announced that Evans and John Loprieno would both reprise their roles as Tina and Cord respectively in September. Evans returned on September 27, 2011. She departed on November 15 of the same year.

== Characterization ==
Tina is a naive teenager when she arrives in Llanview in 1978, the goddaughter of heroine Viki Lord who makes Tina her ward upon the death of Tina's mother. Marco Dane and then Tina's own father, Ted Clayton, use Tina to manipulate Viki. Tina becomes romantically tangled with Greg Huddleston, Mick Gordon and Johnny Drummond before she leaves town in 1981. Returning in 1984, Tina soon discovers a secret room beneath the Lord mansion, where she learns that she is Viki's half-sister thanks to an affair Viki's father had with Tina's mother. Viki has a breakdown, and charistmatic cult leader Mitch Laurence manipulates Tina into using it to seize control of Viki's fortune. Ultimately Tina helps Viki's estranged husband Clint Buchanan shock Viki back to sanity. Tina begins falling in love with Cord Roberts, but her lies and schemes to secure a fortune of her own continually sabotage their relationship.

Passalacqua noted, "Andrea Evans' Tina was the ultimate junior manipulatrix—stupid, selfish and whiny. But for some reason, she was much beloved by the audience." Curtis Harding of Soaps.com wrote, "Tina Lord was, as virtually any of her fellow Llanview folks would likely tell you, tough to love. Vain, selfish, manipulative and greedy, Tina was one of a kind." The character has been called "tempestuous", "spoiled" and "mischievous", and a "whirling dervish". Witter said of the character, "Tina has a good heart, but she's not full of self-confidence. She's lacking in common sense, but she's idealistic, and I find that rather pure." She called Tina "mercurial", but also someone who believes in love.

== Storylines ==
=== 1978–1981 ===
In 1978, longsuffering heroine Victoria Lord takes in 16-year-old goddaughter Tina Clayton as her ward after the presumed death of Tina's mother, Irene Manning Clayton, Viki's best friend from her teenage years and college roommate. As Viki adjusts to the responsibility of raising a teenager, Marco Dane sees the perfect way to get revenge on Viki. In 1979, Marco befriends Tina and opens a modeling agency with a plan to photograph the teen, superimpose her image onto pornographic photos and humiliate Viki by releasing them. Soon Marco grows fond of Tina and changes his plan, but eventually he blackmails Viki with the photos. When Viki stumbles upon Marco's dead body, she takes the photos and flees. She is arrested for his murder, but later is exonerated. Tina becomes involved with Greg Huddleston, and by 1980 she is both seducing Mick Gordon (her best friend Samantha Vernon's boyfriend) and pursuing country-western singer Johnny Drummond. Tina's apparent father, Ted Clayton, comes to town under the guise of reuniting with his daughter but with an ulterior motive—to somehow con Viki and Tina out of as much money as he can. Ted pits himself against Clint Buchanan, who had taken more than a professional interest in widowed Viki. When Ted learns that Clint is about to propose marriage to Viki, he arranges to have Tina kidnapped to distract and get close to Viki, and get his hands on the ransom. Tina is safely returned home, and Ted proposes to Viki. Flustered but touched by his request, Viki opts for time to consider the offer. Clint drops out of the romantic triangle but tries to convince Viki that Ted is deceiving her. When Viki realizes that she is in love with Clint, Ted drugs her. He is arrested as the head of a counterfeiting ring but escapes from jail. When Ted is later killed in 1981, a traumatized Tina leaves town.

=== 1984–1989 ===
Tina returns in 1984 after having read in her mother's diary that Ted Clayton had not been her biological father. In 1985, Tina discovers a secret room under the library in Llanfair, in which she finds Nazi-plundered paintings from World War II and a letter written to Viki from her deceased father, Victor Lord. In the letter, Victor admits to a secret marriage with Irene and that Tina is his daughter, which puts Tina and a shocked Viki at odds. Viki suffers a relapse of her multiple personality disorder, which is subsequently believed to have been originated by a young Viki stumbling upon Victor and Irene in bed. Viki is further humiliated—and furious with Tina—when Victor's confession becomes public. Tina revels in her newly discovered status as Lord heiress, but is soon manipulated by charismatic schemer Mitch Laurence, who seeks her inheritance. Finding out that Victor's estate would revert to Tina if Viki's illness recurred, Mitch convinces a reluctant Tina to assist him in his plan to do just that but, when Tina realizes Mitch actually intends to murder Viki's husband, Clint Buchanan, and frame Viki, she tries to stop him. Mitch accidentally kills Harry O'Neill instead and Tina is accused of the crime. She is later exonerated but, uses Viki's mental illness to gain control of the Lord estate. Tina schemes to bed Clint while Viki's alter ego, Niki Smith, poses as a supposedly cured Viki and plots her own escape from Viki's life. Tina blackmails Niki into divorcing Clint just as Clint discovers Niki's charade. In 1986, Clint ultimately lures Niki to witness a staged sexual encounter between him and Tina, which forces a shocked Viki to re-emerge.

With Viki well and Tina engaged to wealthy Richard Abbott, the sisters somewhat reconcile. During a 1986 visit to El Paso, Texas, Tina meets and starts falling in love with good-natured cowboy Cord Roberts. When she discovers Cord is secretly Clint's son, Tina breaks off her engagement to Richard and races to marry Cord before he knows he is a Buchanan heir. She succeeds, and Cord's paternity is revealed; he returns a gift of $1 million from his new-found grandfather, Asa Buchanan. Tina blackmails Asa (with the knowledge of his secret marriage to Pamela Stuart) into giving her the money. She secretly buys the Caribbean isle of Devil's Claw, but is kidnapped by terrorists when she and Cord vacation there. Tina is saved, and the island destroyed by bombs. Tina's recurring lies and schemes finally result in their divorce in 1987.

Cord's mother, Maria, brings her old friend, Max Holden, to town that year to romance Tina, whom she despises, and keep Tina from reconciling with Cord. Pregnant with Cord's baby and—thanks to Maria's scheming—thinking that Cord knows and does not care, Tina leaves with Max for Buenos Aires, Argentina. Learning Tina is pregnant, Cord follows her to Argentina, but Max and Tina are mixed up in a drug ring and a captive Tina plummets over the Iguazu Falls in a raft. She and her unborn baby are presumed dead.

Tina later turns up alive in April 1987, having been cared for by the native Palupe Indians. She reappears in Llanview in May 1987 at Cord's wedding to Kate Sanders, at first passing off Max's infant son with Gabrielle Medina as her own son with Cord. Tina and Maria fight over a vial of poison that Maria is planning to use to kill Viki and frame Tina, and Maria dies when the poison spills on her. Tina is charged with killing her, and the baby's true parentage is revealed during the trial. Tina is later exonerated, and in 1988 she and Max find her and Cord's real son alive and being cared for in the Argentine jungle as "Milagro." Max's enemies kidnap the baby and place him in an Italian convent; Tina poses as a nun to retrieve him. Tina and Cord name their son Clinton James Roberts (nicknamed "C.J.") after Clint.

When Tina says, "I take thee, Cord," during her wedding to Max on March 18, 1988, he calls it off. Tina resumes her interest in Cord, who is now involved with Sarah Gordon. But Tina is soon pursued by Cord's uncle, Bo Buchanan, who recently returned to Llanview. It is soon revealed that Tina's suitor is actually a "faux Bo": Kate Sanders' ex, Dr. Patrick London, hired by Asa's enemies to get facial reconstruction and infiltrate the family. Patrick, as Bo, hopes to marry Tina and gain control of her money. He is later found out, and killed by his captive, the real Bo. Pregnant with Patrick's child. Tina is kidnapped by Ursula Blackwell, who is obsessed with Patrick and plans to raise his baby. Tina and Ursula survive a fall out of a lighthouse window, and Tina loses the baby. His romance with Sarah fizzled, Cord reunites with Tina, and the two remarry in November 1988 in a double ceremony with Asa Buchanan and Renee Divine. An escaped Ursula rigs the wedding cake to explode, but the blast kills Max's brother Steve Holden instead.

In January 1989, Tina and Gabrielle fall into a hole and discover the abandoned underground city of Eterna, built by Victor Lord. Viki, Cord, and others also end up trapped in the city, and the storyline culminates with the reveal that Viki had given birth to a daughter in high school but, had been brainwashed by Victor into forgetting it. Throughout the summer of 1989, Tina finds herself in pursuit of the lost Crown Jewels of Mendorra, not realizing her past enemies Jamie and Elizabeth Sanders and an escaped Ursula are also after the jewels. Cord and Tina are held prisoner in Atlantic City but evade death at the hands of the Sanders and Ursula, who are arrested.

In 1989, Tina becomes aware that Gabrielle switched Brenda Holden's healthy baby with the deceased baby of Michael and Alicia Grande. Gabrielle ultimately confesses. At the trial, Tina is forced to admit she knew and had not come forward. Both women are sentenced to six months at a halfway house. Tina begins working at the organization Lord Love the Children headed by Serena and Ambrose Wyman, and, after discovering it is actually an illegal adoption ring, Tina teams up with Viki, Cord, and Roger Gordon to stop the Wymans. Meanwhile, Max and Gabrielle's son is kidnapped, to be sold by the Wymans. The Wymans try to kill them all on New Year's Eve 1989 and fail, but kidnap Tina. Clint comes to the rescue and the Wymans are arrested. Cord and Tina's are falling apart over Tina's continued lies. The final nail in the coffin comes when Tina accuses Cord of having an affair with Gabrielle's sister, Debra. Cord asks for a divorce, and Tina leaves town for San Diego with baby C.J.

=== 1990–1997 ===
In 1990, a pregnant Tina is unsure whether the father of her baby is suave Johnny Dee Hesser, son of mobster Carlo Hesser, or ex-husband Cord. Finding out about the baby and Tina's plans to reconcile with Cord, a distraught Johnny bursts into Llanfair, knocking Tina unconscious and attempting to kidnap her. Viki, incapacitated by a stroke and unable to walk or speak, realizes that Tina's life is in danger; her alternate personality Niki Smith emerges. As Niki, Viki is able to stand — and shoots Johnny to death. Initially, both Viki and Tina have no memory of what happened, and Tina becomes the prime suspect in the murder. However, an audio tape recorded in the room later exonerates her, and proves that Viki had acted in self-defense. Tina flees to Texas as Carlo makes clear his intention to take his grandchild from Tina when it is born. Cord follows with medical proof that the baby is his, and their daughter Sarah is born in a snowstorm in February 1991. Cord and Tina return to Llanview and remarry, but Cord is presumed dead later that year; he turns up alive around a year and a half later to discover that his supposed widow Tina has taken up with Cain Rogan. Unable to reconcile, Cord and Tina divorce for the final time in 1993.

Tina becomes romantically involved with con man Cain Rogan, marrying and leaving town with him in 1994, but soon returning alone after Cain goes back to his ne'er-do-well pursuits.

As Dr. Dorian Lord is on trial for the 1976 murder of her former husband (and Tina's father) Victor in 1994, a man named David Vickers comes forward with the diary of Tina's mother Irene. The diary exonerates Dorian and reveals the existence of Victor and Irene's second child — a son, who would stand to inherit a fortune hidden for him by Victor himself. David claims to be that son. Tina returns to town, and despite their connection as full brother and sister, David and Tina find themselves attracted to each other. They sleep together, but David immediately reveals to Tina that he is only pretending to be the missing Lord heir. The couple conspire to take the inheritance, even marrying in 1995 to secure their claim. Eventually town pariah Todd Manning is revealed to be Victor and Irene's son, and David is arrested. With Viki again under the influence of her dissociative identity disorder, her icy alternate personality Jean Randolph forces David to divorce Tina in exchange for his freedom.

On June 12, 1996, Tina moves with C.J. and Sarah to Baltimore, Maryland to become a professional shopper for Logan's Department Store. She reappears briefly in September 1996, and again on Christmas 1996 and finally from January 21 to January 24, 1997 as Cord leaves town.

=== 1997–2007 ===
In 2003, Tina and Cord's daughter Sarah (now calling herself "Flash") returns to Llanview. It is noted that Viki, Cord and the Buchanan family had lost all track of Tina and the children since they had moved to Baltimore and had not heard from them for years. Sarah reveals that during Tina's hiatus from town, she had taken back up with Cain; Sarah claims that Tina and Cain had forbidden her from pursuing her musical dreams, and that Tina's parenting had driven both Sarah and C.J. to run away. Though Sarah had come back to Llanview looking for her missing brother, she discovers that C.J. had joined the Navy, deploying into the Indian Ocean and out of contact. In 2004, Cord returns to collect an injured Sarah who was attacked and almost killed by the Music Box Killer, and vows to Viki and Asa Buchanan to find Tina.

When Sarah returns again in 2007, she notes that her mother is "off doing one of her things" and that Tina rarely corresponds but sends her money from time to time. Sarah says that Viki and Clint would have a hard time finding Tina, adding "she's where I got my run and hide genes." Clint confirms that he and Cord cannot locate Tina.

=== 2008 ===
The Crown Jewels of Mendorra are stolen in May 2008 upon their arrival in Llanview for display, and Tina reappears in town on June 11, 2008, as the Crown Princess of Mendorra. She meets with corrupt Llanview Police Commissioner Lee Ramsey, who has stolen the jewels at her request, but soon Ramsey is gunned down and Tina is on the run with the jewels from the sinister U.S. Ambassador to Mendorra Jonas Chamberlain, who apparently wants them for himself. Tina finds refuge with her estranged daughter Sarah and Sarah's boyfriend Cristian Vega; soon Cristian and his brother, Llanview Police Detective Antonio, discover that Jonas has abducted Sarah and her roommate Talia Sahid, Antonio's lover and fellow police officer. Tina and the Vegas agree to accompany Jonas back to Mendorra in order to make an exchange: the women for the Crown Jewels.

In Mendorra, Tina gets the royal treatment from her palace staff and is reunited with her husband, Crown Prince Helmut Krakoff — really Cain Rogan in yet another disguise. Meanwhile, the real mastermind behind the kidnappings reveals himself to his daughter Talia: Carlo Hesser. Cain is anxious to keep the jewels they have worked so hard for, but Tina is desperate to exchange them for Sarah. She bemoans her lot in life, saying, "I should have gone back to Cord!" Carlo, bent on revenge for Tina's part in Johnny Dee's death, exposes her and Cain's fraud publicly and reveals Jonas as the true heir to the throne; he adds that, per Mendorran law, Cain and Tina will be beheaded for their treason. Carlo and his minions first drag Tina, Sarah and Cristian to the river above the treacherous Hohenstein Falls. Tina is horrified as Carlo reveals his intent to send Sarah over the Falls to her death, deliberately echoing Tina's own nearly-fatal plunge over the Iguazu Falls in 1987. Cristian manages to escape Carlo's guards and swim to Sarah's raft; Tina watches history repeat itself as Sarah and Cristian go over the Falls on July 22, 2008. Cristian turns up alive but Sarah is presumed dead. Cristian saves Tina and Cain from the executioner's axe, but not before Tina responds to Cain's declaration of love with a thoughtless "I love you too, Cord!" — a mistake she had also made in 1988 while at the altar with Max Holden. Sarah reappears alive, just in time to join the others in their escape. A duplicitous Cain later parachutes from the plane with the Crown Jewels — not knowing that Tina has already switched the gems with fakes — and in Llanview, Tina is soon reunited with Viki, and then with Cord. After Cord hears about the drama in Mendorra, Tina is devastated when he tells her that she has not changed, and they can never be together.

When Viki leaves town to tour Africa as a goodwill ambassador, Tina takes it upon herself to move back into Llanfair and install herself as the de facto "lady of the manor." Upon reuniting with Viki's daughters, Jessica and Natalie, Tina is eager to play den mother in her sister's absence. She makes fast friends with Natalie, a relative newcomer and former fellow "black sheep of the family," but Tina's once-loving relationship with Jessica is now fractious and antagonistic. Stunned by Jessica's cold and rude behavior, Tina is unaware that Jessica is actually "Tess," her dangerous alternate personality, who has secretly emerged from Jessica's psyche to take control and seek revenge on Natalie and her lover Jared Banks, whom Tess blames for the death of Nash Brennan, Jessica's husband and the love of Tess's life. As Tina settles into Llanfair, she takes care to hide the stolen Mendorran Crown Jewels in Viki's wall safe, fearing she will be apprehended by international authorities. Tina grows increasingly suspicious of "Jessica's" strange actions when she discovers her niece has ordered construction to be done in the Llanfair basement. "Jessica" claims the construction work is a surprise for the family, but when Tina and her beloved Shih Tzu "David Vickers" go snooping in the basement, they discover the soundproofed secret room Tess has built below the house. Tina reflects on her memories of her father Victor Lord's own secret room, and its significance to Viki and her own alternate personalities, one of whom had imprisoned Dorian Lord below Llanfair. Remembering her own complicated relationship with Viki's alters such as Niki Smith, Tina realizes that Tess has emerged. Before Tina can alert the family, Tess traps her in the secret room. Tess discovers the jewels in the safe and threatens to not only tell the authorities, but a vengeful Carlo as well. Fearing for herself and especially Sarah, Tina begrudgingly agrees to not only stay quiet, but to help Tess drag a drugged Natalie down into the secret room. A guilty Tina tries to thwart Tess several times, but is always caught; Tina sends Jared down to the basement to find Natalie, but Tess traps him as well. Viki returns to town in time to realize that Tess is on the loose. With a bomb set to go off, Tina leads Viki and Jared's father Charlie Banks down to the secret room in time to save Natalie and Jared. On November 14, 2008, Tina comes clean to a furious Viki, who tells Tina to leave and never return. Tina says goodbye to a disappointed Sarah on November 25, 2008, too ashamed to explain why she is leaving town. Tina peers into Jessica's hospital room, sadly watching Viki, Clint and Natalie surrounding Jessica and her daughters — the family Tina may never be a part of again. Finally, Tina goes to the crypt of her father Victor, curses him for the damage he has done to Viki and the rest of the family, and vows to return to Llanview someday.

=== 2011 ===
Tina returns to Llanview with her dog David Vickers for the reading of Todd's will on September 27, 2011. She is shocked to discover that her mother Irene is alive and well, and that the brother who has just died is not Todd, but his secret twin brother, Victor Lord, Jr. Victor has left everything to Irene. Tina sees Cord at Llanfair, but he is still angry at her for endangering other members of the family with her schemes during her 2008 visit. Tina's dog goes missing, and the search for him brings Tina and Cord closer. They reminisce about their past together and nearly kiss, but are interrupted by Clint. Tina and Viki talk about their troubled relationship, mostly influenced by Tina's many past mistakes, but the sisters decide to put the past aside. Tina's dog returns. Tina and Cord nearly get intimate with each other again after they babysit Jessica and Robert Ford's son Ryder, but Natalie interrupts them. Natalie confronts Tina for being partly responsible for having her locked in the basement by Tess. Tina apologizes to Natalie, and offers to plan Natalie's upcoming wedding with Brody Lovett. Natalie accepts. Viki tells Tina that she is pushing too hard to rekindle things with Cord. Tina and Cord hash out their problems in the stables, but end up having sex. Cord tells Tina that despite this, he does not know if he can trust her again. Tina vows to regain his trust. Her commitment to changing is tested when she inherits all of Victor Jr.'s fortune, Irene's money, and The Sun newspaper. Tina is elated to be rich at last, but recalls her intentions to not be fueled by greed and hands over both fortunes and The Sun to Todd, the rightful owner. Todd, Viki, and Victor Jr.'s widow Téa Delgado are pleasantly surprised. Cord learns of Tina's benevolence, the two declare their love and share a passionate kiss. On November 15, 2011, Tina interrupts Natalie and Brody's wedding with the missing paternity test results proving that Natalie's ex-boyfriend John McBain, not Brody, is the father of Natalie's baby Liam. The wedding is called off. Cord proposes to Tina, who accepts. They marry then and there for the fourth time.
