= Judith Barcroft =

American Broadway and soap opera actress

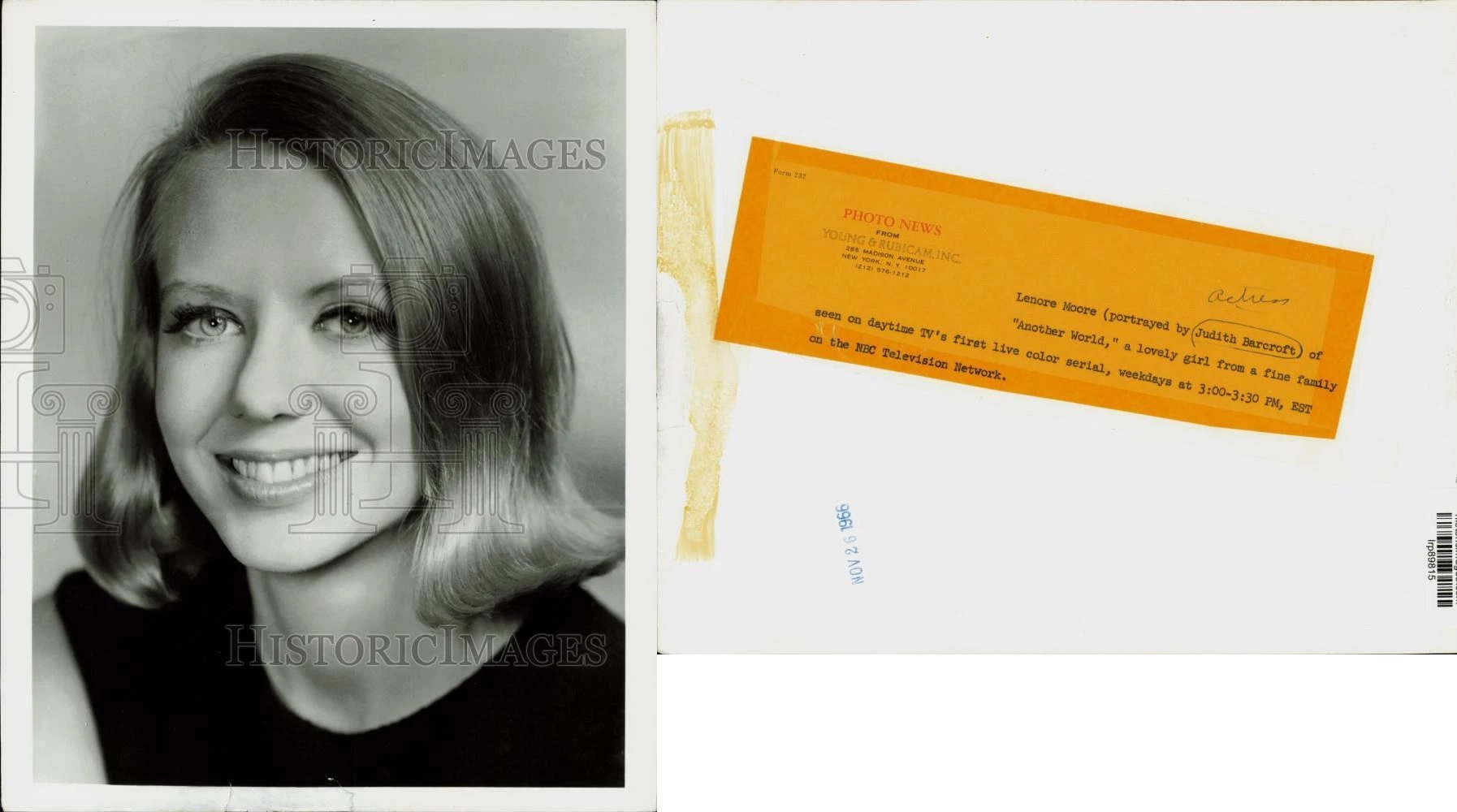
- Born: July 6, 1942 (age 84); Washington, District of Columbia, U.S.
- Occupation: Actress

Judith Barcroft (born July 6, 1942) is an American Broadway and soap opera actress.

== Early years ==
Barcroft was born on July 6, 1942, in Washington, District of Columbia.

== Career ==
She began her soap career in 1966 by creating the role of Lenore Moore on Another World, a role she played until 1971. In 1970, she made a cameo appearance as Lenore on the AW spin-off, Somerset. Lenore was in a popular romance with attorney Walter Curtin (Val Dufour) who defended Lenore for the murder of Wayne Addison (Robert Milli) but who secretly was guilty of killing Wayne himself. Her storyline had Lenore being a bitter enemy with Liz Matthews (then Nancy Wickwire) who was in love with Wayne but blamed Lenore for stealing his affections.

After leaving Another World, she took over the role of Ann Tyler on All My Children. As the daughter of the wealthy Phoebe and Charles Tyler, she married handsome lawyer Paul Martin. After Ann gave birth to a baby who died suddenly, she underwent a mental breakdown, forcing Paul and Phoebe to commit her to a mental hospital. She played the role for six years, leaving All My Children in 1977. The following year, she appeared on The Edge of Night, playing Louise Cavanaugh (Miles and April's mother in dream sequences) for a few episodes.

That same year, she stepped in for Marie Masters in the role of Dr. Susan Burke Stewart on As the World Turns while Masters was on emergency leave. It was at this time that Barcroft took a three-year hiatus from acting, returning to daytime in 1981 on Ryan's Hope in the role of Barbara Wilde, a soap actress desperate for publicity. Barbara briefly dated Dr. Seneca Beaulac but sued him for malpractice after blaming him for going forward with a medical procedure that threatened to destroy her career. In 1983, she returned to As the World Turns for a brief stint as D.A. Sara Comstock, which she repeated the following year. She then returned to The Edge of Night in a completely different role, playing Laurie Karr's psychiatrist, Dr. Eleanor Prentice, until the show was canceled in the winter of 1984. In 1986, the producers of One Life to Live asked her to temporarily fill in for Erika Slezak as Victoria Lord Buchanan. Her final appearance on soap operas was in 1988, playing a pharmacist for one day on Another World.

Her Broadway credits are: Mating Dance, Dinner At Eight, Plaza Suite, All God's Chillun Got Wings, Elephant Man, Betrayal, and Shimada.

== Personal life ==
Barcroft married Wisner Washam in 1969.

== Filmography ==
=== Film ===
Year	Title	Role	Notes
2008	We Pedal Uphill	Constance	

=== Television ===
Year	Title	Role	Notes
1966–1988	Another World	Lenore Moore / Pharmacist	126 episodes
1971–1976	All My Children	Anne Tyler Martin / Anne Tyler Davis	6 episodes
1975–1984	As the World Turns	Various roles	9 episodes
1978	On Our Own	Jennifer D'Arcy	Episode: "Arrivederci Toni"
1981	Nurse	Mrs. Lundy	Episode: "A Little Rain"
1981–1982	Ryan's Hope	Barbara Wilde	39 episodes
1982	Born Beautiful	Serena Belcher	Television film
1984	The Edge of Night	Dr. Eleanor Prentice	14 episodes
1988	Spenser: For Hire	Ms. Charlie Branch	Episode: "Watercolors"
