= Jeffrey King (One Life to Live) =

- One Life to Live character
- Portrayed by: Corbin Bleu
- Duration: 2013
- First appearance: April 29, 2013
- Last appearance: August 19, 2013
- Created by: Susan Bedsow Horgan and Thom Racina
- Introduced by: Jennifer Pepperman
In-universe information
- Occupation: Director of online content for The Banner; Former Freelance writer for The Banner

Jeffrey King is a fictional character from the soap opera One Life to Live. The character was introduced in 2013, and the role was originated by Corbin Bleu.

A freelance journalist, Jeffrey is a friend of Llanview residents Danielle Manning and Matthew Buchanan, both of whom he met off-screen while Danielle attended boarding school in London in 2009. The character plays a pivotal role in the show's relaunch as his arrival and introduction as the star reporter at The Banner helps to reignite the iconic long standing feud between Victoria "Viki" Lord and Dorian Cramer Lord.

== Creation ==
=== Background and casting ===
In January 2013, head writer Susan Bedsow Horgan posted photos on Facebook of herself and co-head writer Thom Racina as they brainstormed over a list of character names. The newly created character of Jeffrey was at the bottom of the list. A brand new character listed among the usual One Life characters led to speculation that the name was code for an already established character. Several other characters emerged in audition scripts, including "Sam" and "Mick Wilder" which led to speculation that the three were the same character.

On March 14, 2013, producers Prospect Park sent out a press release announcing that star Corbin Bleu, known for his supporting role of Chad Danforth in the musical franchise High School Musical, had been cast in the role of Jeffrey King. Bleu later took to Facebook to express his excitement about joining the series in its next life. Bleu told Us Weekly that the producers called and offered him the role. The actor revealed in an interview with Soap Opera Digest that the executive producer reached out to him personally. Bleu made his first appearance in the premiere of the revived series on Hulu, on April 29, 2013.

=== Characterization ===
Jeffrey was listed as "Black + British" in his 20s. According to the original press release, Jeffrey is a "brilliant young reporter who moves to Llanview to work for publisher, Victoria Lord (Erika Slezak) at Llanview’s newspaper, The Banner." The official series description from iTunes described the character as "Viki’s sexy, young reporter." According to Bleu, Jeffrey is a very "eager" reporter. He is "smart," "quick" and "power hungry". "I love that he is able to spit out information without thinking," said Bleu; Jeffrey really knows journalism. According to Bleu, Jeffrey is a "driven person", but he also has a "laid back side to him." Bleu also described the character as "motivated" and "very savvy". In addition, Jeffrey is also very "eager" in his professional life. Jeffrey is not the average "good character", according to Bleu. The character has "a little bit of [good and bad]" in him. The one-time teen star said what appealed to him was Jeffrey's "transformation" from his work persona to his who he is when he hangs around with friends. Bleu revealed that Jeffrey's "dark side" plays a part in both his personal and professional life. When asked if his character would ever take a page from his High School Musical character and perform, Bleu stated that "singing" would not be very in character for Jeffrey.

== Development ==
Because Jeffrey is a new and un-established character, Bleu said, "[T]he possibilities are endless." According to Bleu, "[Viewers] see lots of different sides to him." In an interview, Bleu stated that there was a lot that would happen with the character of Jeffrey. Bleu revealed in Soap Opera Digest that the character of Jeffrey intermingles in quite a few storylines. Bleu's first major storylines provides him with the opportunity to work with not only the newcomers to the show but also longtime veterans. When asked about a potential love interest, Bleu revealed that there was a potential pairing with Jeffrey and Destiny Evans (Shenell Edmonds) coming up. Bleu referred to Jeffrey's past as having a "puppet strings" effect on his future. In November 2011, Bleu said that the series would soon delve into Jeffrey's past and reveal his "true purpose". By late November, Ron Raines, known for his role as Alan Spaulding on Guiding Light was cast in the role of Carl Peterson, Jeffrey's longtime mentor.

=== Introduction ===
Jeffrey is a friend of Matthew Buchanan (Eddie Alderson) and Danielle Manning (Kelley Missal) from England. According to the official series description released by iTunes, the character of Jeffrey "uncovers a scandal that ends Dorian’s senatorial career." This development puts Jeffrey right in the middle this longtime feud. During an interview with Michael Fairman, Erika Slezak revealed that Bleu's Jeffrey "is going to be pivotal in the length of this show". She also stated that the character's sole purpose is not just to help revive The Banner. "There is a lot more that is going to happen with him," Slezak said. Bleu said that Jeffrey has a "quick-paced way of speaking" during an interview for Jet Bleu described his character's personality when hanging out with his roommates as Jeffrey's "younger side".

=== Matthew and Danielle ===
At the inception of the online series, Jeffrey, Matthew and Dani are sharing an apartment which Bleu described as "really funny stuff." According to Bleu's costar Kelley Missal, they and costar Rob Gorrie work well off of each other. It is speculated that the three may have attended boarding school together back in 2009. According to Bleu, Jeffrey's dynamic with Dani and Matthew is "very fun and humorous" and at times comes off as a sitcom. The trio are constantly "jabbing at each other and getting into trouble together." A review from TV Source said that the chemistry between Missal and Gorrie's characters helps to establish Jeffrey's place on in the canvas as their friend.

=== Viki and The Banner ===
"It’s a great dynamic that the show has never really seen before and the two of them have a mutual respect for one another."

— Bleu on Jeffrey and Viki's relationship.

Head writer Thom Racina described Jeffrey as becoming a savior for Slezak's Victoria at The Banner. Jeffrey and Viki develop a very close relationship. "He'll become her star reporter in a story that will also heavily involve Viki's longtime rival, Dorian Lord (Robin Strasser)" Bleu's Jeffrey helps to keep the struggling newspaper alive by helping to bring into the "digital age" said Bleu. In Jeffrey's eyes, the newspaper is failing because it is "still in the old school way of doing things". Bleu describes Jeffrey as being Viki's "adviser" to bring the paper into the digital era. It is in his work that viewers "see who Jeffrey really is". The character has a "strong personality when it comes to his work", and he is not afraid to challenge Viki about what her paper needs to survive. Jeffrey has no problem telling Viki "the truth" and he is not "afraid of her at all." "It’s a great dynamic that the show has never really seen before and the two of them have a mutual respect for one another." During an interview on the behind the scenes series, More One Life to Live, Bleu stated "Everybody answers to Viki. And this is the first time, I think, that you get a chance to see a relationship where she is taking advice from someone else. There is a "power struggle" between Jeffrey and Viki, explained Bleu, because Jeffrey is someone young who tries to come in and "take over". This struggle is displayed when Jeffrey convinces a reluctant Viki to run a very damaging quote from Dorian, despite her suspecting that Dorian is being framed by a government official. On Jeffrey's missing out on the permanent staff position at The Banner, Bleu said, "He'll get his day."

== Reception ==
In addition to the casting news being announced by the usual soap press, Bleu's casting garnered the attention of several pop publications including Entertainment Weekly, Access Hollywood, Perezhilton.com, Michael Ausiello's TVLine, Nikki Finke's Deadline Hollywood, and several others. The casting also made news in the Broadway world due to Bleu's recent appearances in Godspell and In the Heights.

Bleu later took to Twitter where he promised to release a photo of his character's first appearance if his followers could the show's new Twitter account reach 5,000 followers, which it did. Daytime Confidential's Jillian Bowe responded to the casting news with "Prospect Park ain't playing around!" referencing the prior perception that Prospect Park did not take the task of relaunching OLTL and its sister show seriously. With such a wide variety of acting credits, from Broadway, to television and film, TVSource Magazine's Omar Nobles said Bleu "should fit in quite nicely in the world of soaps". Sara Bibel referred to Bleu as an "unexpected addition" to the cast. Bibel continued, and stated that an actor of Bleu's caliber joining the series was definitely a sign of future success. Soap Opera Network's Errol Lewis said fans would definitely be able to relate to the young adult Jeffrey's storyline in which he lands his dream job as reporter. "A character given a job that doesn't feel forced just because their portrayer is a “name” actor is refreshing" Lewis said in reference to Bleu's Jeffrey.

In a review of the show's premiere episode, Jamey Giddens of Daytime Confidential referred to Bleu and his costar Robert Gorrie, who portrayed Matthew Buchanan as two of the "most promising" newcomers to join the series in recent years. Thomas Montalto of Soap Opera Network noted that the Jeffrey character "fits in well" despite him being unfamiliar with Bleu's previous work. Jodie Lash of Access Hollywood said Bleu "fits in like he’s been in Llanview for years" and said Jeffrey is a "great character." Fan response has been overwhelming positive from Bleu's fans, a lot of whom are new to the soaps. Though they only tuned in to see his character, they have gotten hooked on the series. Soap Opera Digest said Bleu's Jeffrey helped round out the cast without the character feeling "forced". The character of Jeffrey was listed on Daytime Confidential's list of Shirtless Soap Hunks of May 2013 and was described as a "hot cup of mocha." Bleu was voted as second most popular newcomer in the June 10, 2013 issue of Soaps In Depth with 31% of votes. Michael Fairman listed Bleu as a runner up for the "Best Newcomer Male" in 2013. Daytime Confidential ranked Bleu at #6 on their list of the "10 Best Soap Opera Newbies" for the year and said they were quite "surprised" by his portrayal. The website also praised his chemistry with Robert Gorrie and Kelley Missal.
