= Josh Hall (One Life to Live) =

- One Life to Live character
- Laurence Fishburne as Josh Hall in 1973
- Portrayed by: Laurence Fishburne (1973–76); Todd Davis (1977); Guy Davis (1985–86)
- Duration: 1973–77; 1985–86
- First appearance: April 1973
- Last appearance: 1986
- Created by: Agnes Nixon
- Introduced by: Doris Quinlan; Paul Rauch (1985)
In-universe information
- Other names: Joshua West; Joshua Hall
- Occupation: Physician
- Adoptive father: Ed Hall
- Adoptive mother: Carla Gray
- Sons: Jared Hall
- Grandmothers: Sadie Gray (adoptive)

Josh Hall is a fictional character on the American soap opera One Life to Live, originated by actor Laurence Fishburne from 1973 until 1976. Todd Davis assumed the role in 1977. Josh reappeared in fictional Llanview, Pennsylvania in 1985 as a doctor, played by Guy Davis from 1985 until 1986.

== Background and reception ==
One Life to Live creator Agnes Nixon created Joshua West, adopted as Joshua "Josh" Hall, as the first television or film role for eleven-year-old child actor Laurence Fishburne (credited as "Larry Fishburne") in 1973, first appearing in April. Fishburne was cast for his premiere television role with Nixon by casting director Joan D'Incecco.

Fishburne's 1973–74 portrayal of troubled teenaged youth Joshua West adopted by newly-married couple Ed Hall (Al Freeman Jr.) and Carla Gray (Ellen Holly) earned him the "Best Juvenile Actor" honor at the 1974 "Afternoon TV Writers and Editors Awards." The family unit of Freeman's Ed, Holly's Carla and Fishburne's Josh was heralded as "daytime television's first African American family."

While a castmember of One Life to Live, Fishburne starred in the 1975 film, Cornbread, Earl and Me. He left the series in 1976 at 14-year-old to accept a role in the Francis Ford Coppola film, Apocalypse Now. Fishburne lied to Coppola about his age to win the Apocalypse Now role of 17-year-old Vietnam War Navy PBR crewmember Tyrone "Mr. Clean" Miller.

Todd Davis took over the role from Fishburne briefly in 1977. The character became a friend of Samantha Vernon.

Guy Davis played the character, who had become a medical doctor, from 1985 until its last appearance in 1986.
