= Thurman Scott =

American actor and theatre director

- Born: Thurman E. Scott; United States
- Occupations: Actor, theatre director, acting teacher
- Years active: 1960s–present
- Known for: Founder and artistic director of The Actors Theatre Workshop

Thurman E. Scott is an American actor, director, and producer. He is the founder and artistic director of the Actors Theatre Workshop, a New York City theatre company. He was artistic director with the National Black Theater. Scott won an Obie Award as actor for his role in Open 24 Hours and an Obie for director of the play Soldiers of Freedom.

== Early life and education ==
Scott was born in North Carolina about 1952. His father was white, and his mother was black. His paternal grandparents disapproved of the marriage. Scott was raised by his maternal grandparents in North Carolina until he was 12, when he went to live in Philadelphia with his mother and stepfather, where he would grow up.

In 1960, he joined the United States Air Force. There he was trained by boxing instructor, Rollie Hackman. Scott became the all-services welterweight champion. Scott was discharged in 1964. He earned a Fullbright scholarship and studied in England at the London Academy of Dramatic Arts. Later, he studied under actress, Stella Adler.

== Career ==
Scott began his professional acting career in 1969. His stage credits include the New York Shakespeare Festival, Open 24 Hours, The David Show, The Blood Knot, To Be Young, Gifted and Black, The Tempest, Becket, and The Bridgehead. Scott won an Obie award as actor for his part in Open 24 Hours.

Scott also appeared in feature films and television, including on the soap opera One Life to Live.

Scott also became artistic director with the National Black Theater. He won an Obie award as director for Soldiers of Freedom.

In 1990, Scott founded the nonprofit theatre company Actors Theatre Workshop in New York City. This organization puts on theatrical productions and runs acting programs and educational initiatives for children and adults, like Builders of the New World. Scott continues to serve as the company's artistic director.

== Selected filmography ==
| Year | Title | Role | Notes |
|---|---|---|---|
| 1967 | The Incident | — | Feature film |
| 1968 | The Paper Lion | — | Feature film |
| 1968 | One Life to Live | Dr. Price Trainor | Television series (2 episodes) |
| 1971 | Love Is a Many Splendored Thing | Judd Washington | Television series |
| 1972 | Across 110th Street | Doc's Guard | Feature film |
| 1973 | The Werewolf of Washington | Hippie | Credited as Thurmon Scott |
| 1974 | Three Tough Guys | Tony | Feature film |
| 1975 | The American Parade | Frederick Douglass | Television miniseries |
| 1979 | Voices | Patterson | Feature film< |

== Selected stage credits ==
| Production | Role | Notes |
|---|---|---|
| Open 24 Hours | Number One | Off-Broadway production |
| The David Show | Ham (understudy) | Off-Broadway |
| The Blood Knot | Leading role | National tour |
| To Be Young, Gifted and Black | Leading role | National tour |
| The Tempest | Various roles | Center Stage |
| Becket | Thomas Becket | Special performance at the Moscow Art Theatre |
| The Bridgehead | Tatum | Actors Theatre of Louisville, Humana Festival (1977) |
