= Nancy Frangione =

American soap opera actress (1953–2023)

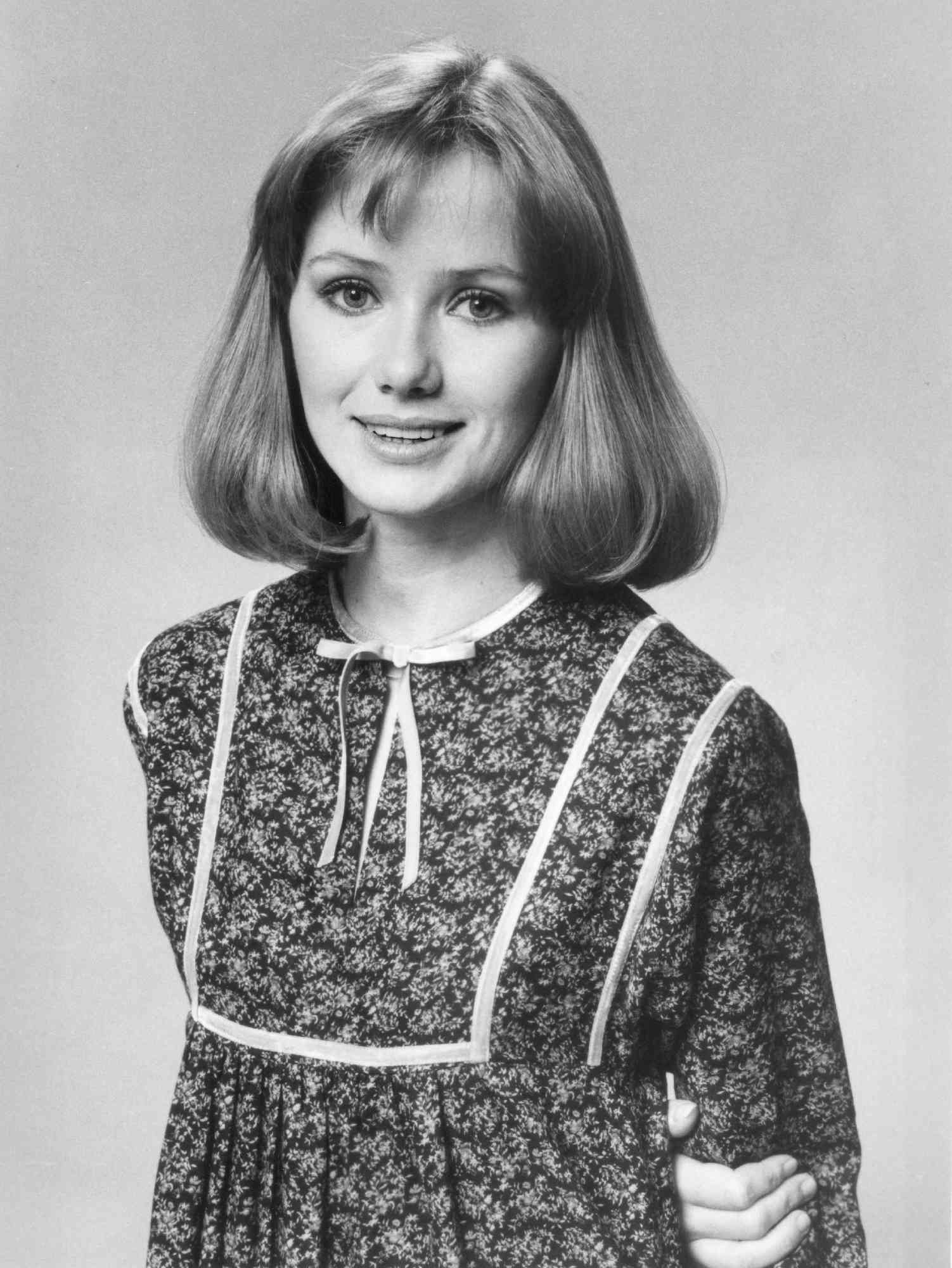
- Frangione in All My Children, 1978
- Born: July 10, 1953; Barnstable, Massachusetts, U.S.
- Died: August 18, 2023 (aged 70); Barnstable, Massachusetts, U.S.
- Occupation: Actress
- Years active: 1977–1996
- Spouse: Christopher Rich (m. 1982; div. 1996)
- Children: 1

Nancy Frangione (July 10, 1953 – August 18, 2023) was an American soap opera actress.

== Career ==
Born in Barnstable, Massachusetts, Frangione was a 1971 graduate of Barnstable High School. She debuted on soap operas in 1977, playing the role of Tara Martin on All My Children; Frangione departed that role in 1979.

Frangione was best known for her role as the scheming villainess Cecile DePoulignac on Another World, which she played from June 1981 to November 1984, winning the 1st Soap Opera Digest Awards as Outstanding Villainess in 1984. She reprised the role four times, in 1986, 1989, 1993, and from October 1995 to June 1996.

In addition to other soap operas, such as One Life to Live, where she filled in for an ailing Andrea Evans as Tina Lord in 1985, Frangione appeared on nighttime television series such as The Nanny (as Fran's cousin Marsha), Highway to Heaven, Matlock, and Buck Rogers in the 25th Century.

== Personal life and death ==
Frangione was married to her Another World co-star Christopher Rich from 1982 to 1996; they had one (adopted) daughter named Mariel Rich.

Frangione died in Barnstable, Massachusetts, on August 18, 2023, at the age of 70.
