= Grace Davidson =

English soprano (born 1977)

- Born: 29 November 1977 (age 48); Richmond, London, England
- Occupation: Soprano
- Website: Official website

Grace Davidson (born 29 November 1977) is an English soprano from London who specialises in the performance of historically informed music from the Renaissance and Baroque periods. She has also recorded for prominent contemporary composers such as Max Richter, Eric Whitacre, Michael Price, and Paul Mealor, and has performed on over 140 soundtracks to date. Highlights include solos on The Hobbit: Desolation of Smaug (Howard Shore, 2015), Over The Moon (Michael Price, 2020), Gunpowder Milkshake (Frank Ilfman, 2021) and The Last Duel (Harry Gregson Williams, 2021).

== Early years and education ==
Davidson was born in Richmond, London and began her musical life playing the piano, violin, and viola. She started singing at the Youth Music Centre in Hampstead Garden Suburb, before studying singing at the Junior Guildhall School of Music and Drama with Mollie Petrie.

While training for a year as a chef at Prue Leith's School of Food and Wine in 1998, Davidson auditioned for London's Royal Academy of Music and was awarded a scholarship to study there with Beatrice Unsworth and Jonathan Papp. While there she won the Early Music prize and was a finalist in the English Song Competition and the London Handel Singing Competition. She graduated with a BMus degree in 2004, and was later awarded an Associate membership of the Academy in 2016.

== Career highlights ==
Davidson began her professional career singing in choirs and consorts specialising in Early music. She has worked extensively with Harry Christophers and The Sixteen in recordings and concerts, featuring as a soloist on their Monteverdi’s Vespers of 1610 and Handel’s Jeptha. She also appeared alongside The Sixteen in a BBC Two documentary with Simon Russell Beale called Monteverdi in Mantua – the Genius of the Vespers.

Other groups she has sung with include Ex Cathedra, The Monteverdi Choir, The Gabrieli Consort, The Tallis Scholars, The English Concert, the Cambridge Singers, Tenebrae, London Voices, The Netherlands Bach Choir, Polyphony and Ensemble Plus Ultra.

Davidson currently appears as a soloist with Collegium Vocale Gent, and on tour with Max Richter, and regularly sings vocals on film soundtracks and commercial recordings in Abbey Road Studios and AIR Studios. Her recordings for soundtracks have also led to singing in live concert performances of The Lord of the Rings and The Hobbit in Europe and the US.

== Contemporary Music and Commissions ==
=== Sleep by Max Richter ===
In 2015 Max Richter chose Davidson to be the singer on his epic venture, Sleep, a piece lasting eight hours that premiered live overnight on BBC Radio 3 from the Wellcome Collection on Euston Road, London on 17 September 2015. Davidson recorded her lullaby, heard at hourly intervals throughout the night, and vocal parts at AIR Studios and the recording was subsequently released on the Deutsche Grammophon label.

She has taken part in all 22 live performances of Sleep around the world. Sleep has been made into a film which premiered at the Sundance Film Festival in Utah, USA in January 2020, and also has its own app.

Davidson is also a featured voice on Richter's album Three Worlds: Music from Woolf Works on Deutsche Grammophon, VOICES and VOICES 2, both on the Decca label.

=== Other collaborations ===
Since 2007, Davidson has worked in partnership with composer and saxophonist Christian Forshaw, as the soprano soloist for the albums Renouncement (2007), Midwinter (2008) and Songs of Solace (2012). Their fourth album together Historical Fiction was recorded during the 2020 COVID-19 lockdown and was released on 17 September 2021.

In 2016, Davidson met composer Rodrigo Ruiz while recording some of his early songs for An Everlasting Dawn (2017), after which the soprano commissioned a new song cycle from him. When the work was finished in 2020, Venus and Adonis became the first song cycle known to be written by a Mexican composer, as well as the only known song cycle (in English or otherwise) set entirely to William Shakespeare's texts. This song cycle was recorded for Signum Classics and released on the eponymous album Venus & Adonis (2024), celebrating Shakespeare's 460th anniversary year.

Other composers Davidson has worked with include:

- Eric Whitacre
- Michael Price
- Howard Shore
- Oliver Davis
- Harry Gregson Williams
- Paul Mealor
- Patrick Hawes
- Rodrigo Ruiz
- Alec Roth
- Francis Pott
- John Rutter

== Personal life ==
Davidson is married to Nigel Short, the founder and conductor of Tenebrae Choir. They live in Cambridgeshire with their two children.

== Reviews ==
“Even in this golden age of ‘early music’ sopranos, Grace Davidson is outstanding for her seraphic purity and evenness of tone.” – Richard Wigmore, Gramophone Magazine 2018

“Grace Davidson’s Galatea was marked by purity of voice and superb, faultless sense of pitch, perfectly paired with the woodwind pipings of ‘Hush, ye pretty warbling quire!’. In duet with the oboe, in ‘As when the dove,’ Davidson’s lightness wove magic.” - Colin Clarke, Seen and Heard International

“Grace Davidson has a voice of great beauty and purity, along with an admirable technique which means that I have rarely heard passagework sung with such apparent ease and evenness.” – Robert Hugill

“In my dreams, I hear Davidson’s soprano echoing through the chambers of my mind” – Gabriel Wilder, Sydney Morning Herald

John Suchet of Classic FM highlighted soprano Grace Davidson’s performance and vocal range.

“Grace Davidson gave a beguiling account of the famous ‘Pie Jesu’. Her tone was warm and pure and her gently beseeching delivery was just right.” – John Quinn, Seen and Heard International, CBSO Performance

“...absolutely gorgeous singing – object lessons in understatement and poise – from both Grace Davidson and William Gaunt. Devastatingly beautiful.” – Marc Rochester, Gramophone Magazine

“...Grace Davidson, who made Pie Jesu the simplest and most precious of gifts.” – Geoff Brown, The Times

"The voice is radiantly fresh and clean" - Geoff Brown, The Times

"Soprano Grace Davidson sings high vocal melodies, a wordless note of striving. The tone is elegiac and dignified..." - Ludovic Hunter-Tilney, Financial Times

== Discography ==
=== Solo albums ===
Title	Details
Grace Davidson: A Portrait	Released: November 2007; Label: Metronome; Formats: Digital download, CD
Patrick Hawes: Angel	Released: March 2014; Label: Decca Records; Formats: Digital download, CD
Handel: Jephtha	Released: September 2014; Label: Coro; Formats: Digital download, CD
Monteverdi: Vespro della beata Vergine (1610)	Released: September 2014; Label: Coro; Formats: Digital download, CD
Max Richter: Sleep	Released: September 2015; Label: Deutsche Grammophon; Formats: Digital download, CD set
Vivaldi & Handel	Released: June 2018; Label: Signum Records; Formats: Digital download, CD
Dowland: First Booke of Songes (1597)	Released: November 2018; Label: Signum Records; Formats: Digital download, CD
Handel: Acis and Galatea	Released: February 2019; Label: Coro; Formats: Digital download, CD
Couperin Leçon de ténèbres	Released: March 2020; Label: Signum Records; Formats: Digital download, CD
Oliver Davis Solace	Released: March 2021; Label: Signum Records; Formats: Digital download, CD

== Filmography ==
=== Television ===
- Sacred Music (2008–2010)
- David Starkey’s Music and Monarchy (2013)

=== Film ===
- Kung Fu Panda (2008), vocalist/soprano
- How to Train Your Dragon (2010), vocalist/soprano
- Despicable Me (2010), vocalist/soprano
- Pirates of the Caribbean: On Stranger Tides (2011), solo vocalist
- Harry Potter and the Deathly Hallows – Part 2 (2011), vocalist/soprano
- The Hunger Games: Catching Fire (2013), singer
- The Hobbit: The Desolation of Smaug (2013), singer
- Wonder Woman (2017), vocalist/soprano
- Avengers: Endgame (2019), vocalist/soprano
- Over the Moon (2020), soloist/soprano
- Gunpowder Milkshake (2021), soprano soloist
- The Last Duel (2021), vocalist/soprano
- Ron's Gone Wrong (2021), soprano vocalist
- Project Hail Mary (2026), solo soprano
