= Victoria Lord =

- One Life to Live character
- Erika Slezak as Victoria Lord
- Portrayed by: Gillian Spencer (1968–1970); Joanne Dorian (1970–1971); Erika Slezak (1971–2013); Christine Jones (1980–1981, 1983); Judith Barcroft (1986); Amanda Davies (2003); Leah Marie Hays (flashbacks)
- Duration: 1968–2013
- First appearance: July 15, 1968
- Last appearance: August 19, 2013
- Created by: Agnes Nixon
- Introduced by: Doris Quinlan; Jennifer Pepperman (2013)
- Book appearances: Patrick's Notebook
In-universe information
- Other names: Niki Smith, Tommy, Jean Randolph, Princess, Tori Lord, Victor Lord (alternate personalities); Barbara Wedgeworth
- Occupation: Publishing magnate; Socialite; Businesswoman; Hospital board member; Waitress (2008); University president (2003–2004); Mayor (1990–1991)
- Family: Lord
- Parents: Victor Lord; Eugenia Randolph Lord
- Stepmother: Dorian Lord
- Sisters: Meredith Lord
- Half-brothers: Tony Lord; Todd Manning; Victor Lord, Jr.
- Half-sisters: Tina Lord
- Husband: Roger Gordon (pre 1968); Joe Riley (1969–70, 1974–79); Steve Burke (1972–74); Clint Buchanan (1982–85, 1986–94); Sloan Carpenter (1994–95); Ben Davidson (2000–04); Charlie Banks (2009–11)
- Sons: Kevin Buchanan; Joey Buchanan
- Daughters: Megan Gordon; Jessica Buchanan; Natalie Buchanan
- Stepdaughters: Megan Craig Riley
- Grandsons: Duke Buchanan; Ryder Ford; Liam McBain; Kevin Buchanan, Jr.
- Granddaughters: Megan Rappaport; Bree Brennan; Chloe Brennan
- Aunts and uncles: Powell Lord; Gwendolyn Lord Abbott; Dorothy Randolph
- Nieces and nephews: Brian Kendall; Daniel Wolek; C. J. Roberts; Sarah Roberts; Starr Manning; Danielle Manning; Jack Manning; Sam Manning; Victor Lord III
- First cousins: Richard Abbott; Clayton-Powell Lord II
- Other relatives: Zane Buchanan; Powell Lord III; Hope Manning-Thornhart

Victoria Lord is a fictional character and matriarch of the Lord family on the American soap opera One Life to Live, played for over 41 years by six-time Daytime Emmy Award-winning actress Erika Slezak.

The character was created as one of the protagonists by series creator Agnes Nixon, and first cast to Gillian Spencer on the pilot aired July 15, 1968. Nixon later recast her with Slezak, who became synonymous with the character role following a continual portrayal spanning her debut March 17, 1971 through the ABC Daytime finale January 13, 2012. Slezak reprised the role in The Online Network continuance of One Life to Live aired on Hulu, iTunes, FX Canada, and the Oprah Winfrey Network from April 29, 2013 through the final episode released August 19, 2013.

The role of Victoria is the mainstay original lead character of the serial, and her storylines focus on drudgery, love, and family troubles. One of the longest-running characters on American daytime television, Victoria weathers widowhood (three times), divorce (four times), a brain aneurysm, a near-death out-of-body experience (three times), being shot (two times), sent to jail, suffering a stroke, breast cancer, rape, recovered memories of being molested as a child, a heart attack, heart disease, a heart transplant, the abduction of three of her five children as infants, discovering she has four half-siblings, the deaths of two siblings, and the death of her daughter from lupus. Most notably, she suffers recurring bouts with dissociative identity disorder throughout the show narrative.

Slezak's tenure as Victoria earned the actress a reputation as a leading actor in American serials, with her portrayal becoming one of the most lauded and longest-running in American soap operas.

== Character background ==
It is a very, very good job, but it takes a lot of work, and it takes responsibility. You are responsible to the audience for who you're playing. You're responsible to your writers and your producer for the character, and you are extremely responsible to your fellow actors. There are people who don't realize that.

— Erika Slezak on playing Victoria Lord, Archive of American Television

=== Conception ===
One Life to Live series creator Agnes Nixon conceived the central role of Victoria "Viki" Lord inspired by her relationship with her domineering father, Harry Eckhardt, and her own married family life along the Philadelphia Main Line in Bryn Mawr. Nixon took further inspiration from lead protagonist Tracy Lord of the 1939 play The Philadelphia Story, portrayed on stage and film by actress Katharine Hepburn.

=== Casting ===
The role of Victoria was originally cast to Gillian Spencer, who appeared from the July 1968 debut until 1970. Joanne Dorian replaced Spencer from October 1970 until March 16, 1971, when established theater actress Erika Slezak stepped into the role in the following day's episode. Slezak was told she was auditioning for a new character, but when offered the role she learned she was replacing someone else. The producers informed Ernest Graves and Lynn Benesch, who played Viki's father Victor Lord and sister Meredith Lord, of the change in advance, but no one else in the cast or crew knew of the switch when Slezak arrived to work. Slezak became synonymous with the character since her first appearance in the role March 25, 1971, playing Victoria continually for 41 years until the original One Life television finale in 2012. Slezak reprised the role onscreen upon Prospect Park resumption of the serial from April 29, 2013, through the final episode released August 19, 2013.

Two other actresses portrayed Victoria while Slezak was on maternity and personal leave: Christine Jones in 1980 and 1981, and Judith Barcroft in 1987. In the summer of 2003, Slezak's real-life daughter, Amanda Davies, portrayed a teenaged Victoria in flashbacks. Leah Marie Hays played the role of a young Victoria Lord in a series of flashbacks as well.

At the death of show and character creator Agnes Nixon in 2016, Slezak eulogized that, "When she hired me to play Viki on One Life To Live, she changed my life and my career and I will forever be grateful to her."

Slezak expressed interest for reprising portrayal of the character in a short-term guest appearance on ABC's last remaining soap opera, General Hospital, in a March 2018 interview with Soap Opera Digest magazine, ahead of the 50th anniversary of the July 1968 premiere of One Life to Live.

=== Characterization ===
At the debut episode of One Life to Live July 15, 1968, twentysomething recent college graduate and heiress Victoria "Viki" Lord is described by author Martha Nochimson as "blonde [and] ivory-complexioned ... the clichéd American princess," personifying the "woman on a pedestal" archetype. The show's heroine from the outset, ingenue Victoria initially harbors a strong Electra complex and suffers a bout with multiple personalities prompted by her mother Eugenia's absence from childhood and father Victor's incessant grooming of her to eventually helm the family's communication business, Lord Enterprises. As Erika Slezak stepped into the role in 1971, head writer Nixon matured Victoria to a self-assured working woman managing fictional Llanview's predominant newspaper, The Banner. An increasingly headstrong Victoria, relinquishing her primal desires to pander to Victor, marries working-class Banner editor Joe Riley, much to the patriarch's chagrin.

By the mid-1980s, Victoria largely adopts a matronly role along with her capacities as well-connected town businesswoman and socialite, though she is still plagued with intermittent bouts of mental illness. The character comes to mother five of her own children onscreen (three from infancy), while providing surrogate nurture to younger siblings Tina and Todd. Since 2000s, the role has evolved to be regarded as the "grande dame of Llanview." In a 2006 Boston magazine article, Slezak remarked of Victoria representing "the very classy, very old-world money," with writer Michael Callahan calling the character "the stiff-upper-lipped matriarch" of the prominent Lord family.

American journalist and soap opera critic Connie Passalacqua Hayman (pen name "Marlena De Lacroix") briefly summed up the character role:

... Slezak's 'Viki' is the consummate soap opera heroine, because she has so harrowingly and humanistically triumphed over all her life's tragedies.

== Storylines ==
=== 1960s and 1970s ===
The eldest child of domineering millionaire publisher Victor Lord (Ernest Graves), Victoria Lord, often nicknamed "Viki," (originally Spencer) has little time for romance when One Life to Live begins in 1968. She clashes with reporter Joe Riley (Lee Patterson), but they soon fall in love; Victor disapproves and tries to keep them apart. Torn between pleasing her father and following her heart, Viki develops a wild alternate personality named "Niki Smith", who falls in love with Vinny Wolek (Antony Ponzini). Viki's illness — apparently caused by seeing her pregnant mother fall down the stairs as a child — is eventually treated, and she and Joe marry December 11, 1969. Joe is presumed dead in a car accident in 1970, and a heartbroken Viki (Slezak onward) finds comfort with fellow reporter Steve Burke (Bernie Grant) in 1971. After Steve is put on trial and exonerated for the murder of Banner secretary Marcy Wade (Francesca James), he and Viki marry in 1972. When a very-much alive Joe returns in-time for the nuptials, having survived his supposedly deadly car accident, Viki is forced to choose between two husbands. Viki initially stays married to Steve out of obligation, but ultimately divorces him in January 1974. That summer, Dr. Dorian Cramer (then Nancy Pinkerton) blames board member Viki for her suspension from Llanview Hospital, and a rivalry is born that will last decades. Viki and Joe remarry in a simple, New York City ceremony in September. In 1975, Dorian becomes the private physician to Viki's father Victor, soon eloping with him. Viki learns she has a half-brother, Tony Lord (George Reinholt), and Dorian plots to keep Victor's fortune for herself. In 1976, Victor suffers a heart attack and dies after wife Dorian denies him medication, and in his wake Dorian wreaks havoc on the Lord family. Viki and Joe have a son, Kevin Lord Riley, who is soon kidnapped by jealous Cathy Craig Lord (then Jennifer Harmon), but is later returned. In 1978, Viki takes in Tina Clayton (Andrea Evans), the sixteen-year-old daughter of college roommate and best friend Irene Manning Clayton (Kate McKeown), who is apparently dying of cancer. Shortly after Irene dies, Viki goes on trial for the murder of her nemesis Marco Dane (Gerald Anthony), but she is later exonerated following confessional testimony by Karen Wolek (Judith Light). Joe dies from a brain tumor in October 1979. Also in October 1979, Viki serves as the matron of honor in her friend Carla Gray's (Ellen Holly) wedding to Dr. Jack Scott (Arthur Burghardt).

=== 1980s ===
Widowed Viki gives birth to her second son, Joe Riley Jr., in January 1980. After a disastrous relationship with con man Ted Clayton, who brainwashes and drugs her in an attempt to get his hands on her fortune, Viki marries newspaper editor Clint Buchanan (Clint Ritchie) in 1982; he adopts both of her sons. Echo DiSavoy (Kim Zimmer), seeking revenge on Clint for her mother's murder, seduces him in 1983 to ruin his marriage, then fakes her own death and frames him for it. Clint is later exonerated after Echo is found alive, and he and Viki reunite. Viki is shocked to discover in 1985 that her former ward Tina Clayton (Evans) is in fact her half-sister, daughter of Viki's father Victor and not Ted. Thanks to the machinations of Tina's boyfriend Mitch Laurence (Roscoe Born), Viki succumbs to the pressure and Niki Smith returns. Posing as Viki, Niki divorces Clint; Viki later overcomes her illness with the realization that it had actually been triggered by her witnessing Victor and Irene in bed many years before. Clint and Viki remarry in 1986, and Viki gives birth to their daughter Jessica Buchanan in September 1986. Jessica is kidnapped shortly after birth by Allison Perkins (Barbara Garrick), a disciple of Mitch Laurence; Jessica is soon returned unharmed in December, and Allison institutionalized. In 1988, Viki learns that she married and gave birth to a child in high school with high school sweetheart Roger Gordon (Larry Pine), but father Victor had her hypnotized to forget the occurrences. With Viki's memory restored in 1989, she annuls her 1960s off-screen marriage to Roger and initiates a relationship with daughter Megan Gordon (Jessica Tuck), an actress on the soap opera (within a soap opera), Fraternity Row. Megan and Viki initially spar, but ultimately get past their initial conflicts and become close.

=== 1990s ===
In 1990, Viki is elected mayor of Llanview, but a shooting and subsequent stroke leaves her paralyzed and in a wheelchair; Niki Smith emerges to aid a paralyzed Viki stand up and shoot Johnny Dee Hesser (Anthony Crivello) when he attacks Tina. Viki recovers and later donates a kidney to daughter Megan suffering terminal lupus, but Megan dies, leaving Viki devastated. Growing ever-distant from Clint, Viki engages an extramarital affair with Sloan Carpenter (Roy Thinnes); she and Clint divorce in 1994, and she marries Sloan. Sloan dies soon after from Hodgkin's lymphoma, just as the existence of a second child of Victor and Irene's is revealed. Viki's stress reaches a critical point when Dorian (Robin Strasser onward) tells Viki a secret of which she thought Viki had been aware: the fact that Victor had sexually abused his daughter as a child. With this trauma being what had actually initiated Viki's dissociative identity disorder, she subsequently splinters into several personalities, one of which imprisons Dorian in a secret room below Llanfair. Dorian is eventually freed from her confinement, and Viki recovers after realizing she herself (more specifically, one of her alternate personalities) was the one who had smothered Victor to death in 1976. In 1995, reviled town outcast Todd Manning (Roger Howarth) is proven to be Victor and Irene's illegitimate son; Viki and Todd eventually become close. After a failed reconciliation attempt with Clint, Viki meets and falls in love with Ben Davidson (Mark Derwin), who is eventually revealed to be the long-lost son of Asa Buchanan (Philip Carey) and Renée Divine Buchanan (Patricia Elliott). Ben's first wife, Skye Chandler (Robin Christopher), comes to town and tries in vain to keep Ben and Viki apart. That same year, Jessica falls pregnant, but miscarries the child when she is run over by Dorian. She names the child Megan.

=== 2000s ===
Viki is diagnosed with breast cancer in 2000, but survives after a mastectomy and chemotherapy. She and Ben marry in November. In 2001, a girl named Natalie Balsom (Melissa Archer) makes the startling claim that she is Viki and Clint's biological daughter, which is confirmed by a DNA test. Mitch Laurence returns from the dead, divulging to Viki he drugged and raped her around the same time she and Clint conceived Jessica and had unknowingly become pregnant with fraternal twins, one fathered by Clint, Natalie, and the other fathered by Mitch, Jessica (Erin Torpey). Unable to reconcile the revelation, Niki Smith emerges during the ordeal and plots to kill Ben in order to have her freedom, but when Ben is accidentally shot by Antonio Vega (Kamar de los Reyes), Viki returns. Ben is left comatose after the shooting. In 2003, Victor (William Stone Mahoney) is ostensibly revealed to be alive, claiming to have faked his death in 1976; however, shortly after he returns, Victor dies — but not before Viki and Todd confront him on ills inflicted to them in his wake. In 2004, Viki is diagnosed with heart disease and eventually needs a heart transplant. Coincidentally, a comatose Ben dies just as Viki takes a turn for the worse, and his heart is transplanted into Viki, who recovers but must face widowhood once again.

In 2007, Viki and Clint (now Jerry verDorn) start dating again, but Dorian decides she wants Clint for herself and plots to break up the couple. Dorian's schemes succeed, and Clint ends things with Viki to start a new relationship with Dorian. Feeling humiliated and defeated, Viki leaves Llanview for a much-needed vacation and finds herself in Paris, Texas, where she tries to reinvent herself by waiting tables at a local diner. It is there that she meets patron Charlie Banks (Brian Kerwin), a recovering alcoholic, and the two begin seeing one another. Viki ultimately returns to Llanview once her family discovers her secret life, and Charlie's search for his estranged son Jared (John Brotherton) leads him there as well. Viki and Charlie resume their relationship, but break up when Viki discovers that Charlie had lied about the identity of his son in extenuating circumstances. In July 2008, Viki is involved in a car accident with Dorian; Viki's heart stops as a result of the crash, but Dorian manages to revive her. During her unconsciousness, Viki visits Heaven and reunited with her granddaughter, Megan Rappaport (Erin Torpey), Ben and Asa. Reexamining her life, Viki reunites with Charlie, and they marry on August 4, 2009. Viki runs for mayor against Dorian and wins; she steps down, however, to help her family deal with the unexpected return of Mitch Laurence, who wreaks havoc on her daughters and murders Jared in the process.

=== 2010–13 ===
Charlie, devastated over his son's death, quits his sobriety and began drinking, distancing himself from Viki, choosing instead to conspire with Dorian to kill Mitch. Though Dorian tries to stop him at the last minute, Charlie ends up accidentally shooting Jessica (Bree Williamson onward), who survives. Devastated by Charlie's actions, Viki asks him for a divorce, but they eventually reconcile. Viki and Charlie's marriage is further complicated by the return of Echo DiSavoy, a woman who almost destroyed her marriage to Clint in 1983. Echo begins insinuating herself into Charlie and Viki's marriage, much to Viki's dismay. When a paternity revealed Charlie not to be the father of Rex Balsom (John-Paul Lavoisier), a devastated Charlie turns to Echo for comfort. Dorian, who had suspicions about Echo and Charlie's dealings, forged a truce with Viki to uncover Charlie's misgivings. A devastated Viki finds out about Charlie's affair and definitively asks him for a divorce. After confronting Charlie and Echo, Viki goes to court to fight for custody of grandson Ryder Ford while his mother Jessica was ill with her multiple personality. A stressed Viki suffers a bout with multiple personalities on the stand, leading the judge against giving the child to Viki but instead to her son and daughter-in-law, Joey (Tom Degnan) and Aubrey Buchanan (Terri Conn).

In summer 2011 a man with the "original" face of her only known living brother, Todd (Howarth), returned to Llanview claiming to be the victim of eight years of imprisonment and torture at the hands of his mother and Viki's childhood friend, a back-from-the-dead Irene Manning (now Barbara Rhoades). After medical tests revealed the "newer" Todd (Trevor St. John) and the "old" Todd (Howarth) to have identical DNA, Irene appeared to reveal the "two Todds" to be twins. The man who resembled Walker Laurence (St. John) and who has been living as Todd since 2003 was revealed actually have been born Victor Lord, Jr., brainwashed into believing that he is Todd by Irene. Meanwhile, Viki agrees in court to put up Clint in Llanfair for house arrest after he was convicted of various crimes in Llanview. Dorian and Viki ostensibly put an end to their feud of nearly four decades when Dorian leaves town to become an acting U.S. senator. Viki continues work at The Banner when Tina returns to town for the reading of the will of recently murdered Victor, Jr. After months of rehashing old feelings and living under the same roof, Clint and Viki too admit to their unresolved feelings and agreed to give a romantic relationship one more try.

At the original finale, a prison breakout leads Allison Perkins to shoot both Clint and Viki, but only after telling the two that Jessica is in fact Clint's daughter after all and not the daughter of Mitch Laurence. Clint sanctions another paternity test and, in the presence of Jessica, Viki and Natalie, it is revealed Allison's claim to be true. Following all the emotional revelations and tears, Clint again declares his undying love for Viki and asks her to marry him for a third time.

Upon the series resumption in April 2013, Viki accepts Clint's marriage proposal, and concurrently hires freelance journalist Jeffrey King (Corbin Bleu) to investigate the alleged congressional malfeasance of junior U.S. senator Dorian. Upon visiting niece Danielle Manning (Kelley Missal) in the hospital after overdosing on drugs and alcohol, she uncovers her brother Victor, Jr. to be alive. With her family newspaper in financial straits, The Banner focuses on growing the publication's online presence.

== Alternate personalities ==
Slezak as Victoria's main alter-ego Niki Smith in 1985, a performance for which she earned the 1986 Daytime Emmy Award for Lead Actress in a Drama Series

As of the final ABC episode, all of Victoria's six alternate personalities are integrated with her baseline psyche. At times during the series, Viki has been forced to impersonate one of them, particularly Niki and Jean. In order of their first appearance on One Life to Live, they are:

- Nicole "Niki" Smith – a devil-may-care, sexually promiscuous party girl, approximately 22 years old. First appearing in the episode first-run November 15, 1968, Niki appears more times than all of the other alters combined and is very skilled at masquerading as Viki when necessary to hide her re-emergence. Niki has had two serious relationships with Vince Wolek (1968–69) and Harry O'Neill (1985); neither Vinny or Harry realized at the time that Niki was an alter of Viki.
- Tommy – a 14-year-old male alter who first appeared in the episode first-run February 2, 1995, who embodied Viki's anger and rage at her abuse. Tommy usually emerged to protect Princess (another alternate personality), and once threw Dorian Lord down the La Boulaie staircase and attempted to beat her to death with a claw hammer in the Llanfair secret room.
- Jean Randolph – Jean Randolph is the calm, cool, collected and calculating caretaker of all the other alters, who first appeared in the episode first-run February 2, 1995 when Viki's abusive childhood was revealed. Her name is derived from that of Viki's mother, Eugenia Randolph Lord. Jean blackmailed con man David Vickers into divorcing Viki's sister, Tina, and also freed Viki's son, Joey, from Dorian Lord's clutches by imprisoning Dorian in a secret room in the basement of Llanfair, which led Joey to believe that Dorian left him. Jean then forced Dorian to marry David to keep them both occupied and away from Viki's loved ones.
- Princess – a manifestation of Viki as a seven-year-old girl. First appearing in the episode first-run February 21, 1995, Princess is a traumatized child who is constantly reliving the molestation by Viki's father. Protected by Tommy, the 14-year-old alternate personality, who is most angry about the abuse.
- Tori Lord – Tori first appeared in the episode first-run April 18, 1995, approximately 19 years old, after Dorian revealed the truth of Victor's abuse to Viki. It was established that Tori was the alter who murdered Victor Lord in 1976. (It was later revealed that Victor survived and did not die until 2003. However Dorian has planted a seed of doubt regarding that notion, suggesting that the man who re-emerged as Victor in 2003 was a fraud.) Although her declared mission was to force Viki to face the truth, she wreaked much destruction before getting around to that. Tori started undermining The Banner by feeding stories and information to rival newspaper editor Todd Manning, and she torched Llanfair, nearly killing Jessica in the blaze.
- Victor Lord – this personality is the reflective image of Viki's abusive father, Victor. First appearing in the episode first-run October 23, 1995, the Victor Lord personality only emerged a handful of times, but one of the instances that he took over led Viki to attempt suicide by cutting her own wrists to "expel" Victor from her body.

== Reception ==
Series fansite Llanview Labyrinth remarks that although Gillian Spencer's Victoria is featured at the show's outset, "the obviousness of Viki being the show[']s unquestioned 'lead' did not smack the viewer quite as hard as it later would [with Erika Slezak's portrayal]," with Spencer's Victoria melding into the ensemble cast. Joanne Dorian briefly stepped into the role beginning in October 1970, with a markedly less dynamic presence on the series than her predecessor.

In March 1971, One Life to Live executive producer Doris Quinlan remarked to After Noon TV magazine of Erika Slezak and her audition before herself, series creator and head writer Agnes Nixon, and director David Pressman, "You've got to meet this girl—she's going to be a star."

Since the introduction of Slezak as Victoria, her portrayal has become regarded as definitive to the role. Slezak's work has garnered her the acclaim of media critics and viewers alike, earning the actress comparisons between herself and contemporary film star Meryl Streep for perceived similarities in acting range, versatility, and numerous award nominations. Slezak has received nine Daytime Emmy Award nominations in the category of Outstanding Lead Actress for her portrayal of Victoria, winning in 1984, 1986, 1992, 1995, 1996, and 2005. At the finale of the show's last iteration, she held the record for most Emmy wins by an actress. She also garnered the Soap Opera Digest Award for Favorite Couple with co-star Mark Derwin (Ben Davidson) in 2000.

In 2002, in recognition for her work on One Life to Live, Slezak was inducted as a member of the Silver Circle of the New York chapter of the National Academy of Television Arts and Sciences for over a quarter-century of "significant contributions" to television. In July 2020, Soaps.com cited Slezak's casting in the role as the third-best recast of all-time on a soap opera.
