= Lynn Benesch =

American actress (1940–2023)

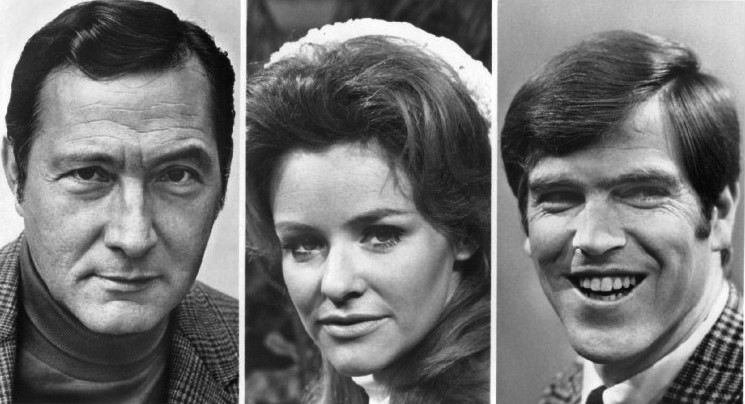
- Lynn Benesch (middle) as Meredith Lord in One Life to Live, c. 1973
- Born: Lynn Benish; August 9, 1940; Westchester, New York, U.S.
- Died: July 4, 2023 (aged 82); Georgia, U.S.
- Occupation: Actress
- Years active: 1969–1987

Lynn Benesch (born Lynn Benish; August 9, 1940 – July 4, 2023) was an American actress and singer, best known for her role as Meredith Lord on the daytime drama One Life to Live from 1969 to 1973. In 1972 she won praise for her portrayal as a mother who had twins and one was stillborn; this led to addressing the issues around postpartum depression which was still struggling to be understood as a legitimate medical concern. She briefly reprised the role in 1987, when her character's sister Victoria Lord, having an out of body experience, took a trip to Heaven and reunited her with deceased loved ones. As Lynn Chester her theatrical credits include "Wait Until Dark" with Shirley Jones and "Star-Spangled Girl" with Anthony Perkins as well as the television series "General Hospital".

A gifted singer and songwriter, she appeared with Skitch Henderson, and Wayland Pickard, with whom she co-wrote original songs which she performs in BBC-5's American import, radio soap opera "Milford-Haven" music episodes. She was a kindergarten teacher before going into acting and when younger she put on shows for Vietnam vets who were confined to a VA hospital in the late 1960s and early 1970s along with a childhood friend.

Benesch died on July 4, 2023, at the age of 82. Her death was not announced publicly until January 2026.

== Filmography ==
According to All Media Guide/New York Times:

- The Doctors as Bonnie Evans (March 1968)
- One Life to Live (1969–1973, 1987) – as Meredith "Merrie" Lord
- Comedy Tonight (1970)
- Planet of the Apes (1974)
- Gunsmoke (1975) – as Zoe
- Happy Days (1976) – as Miss Franklin
- The Next Step Beyond (1978) (sequel series to One Step Beyond)
- How the West Was Won (1978) – as Mina
- Rhoda (1978)
- The Great Brain (1978)
- Starsky and Hutch (1979) – as Candy Reese
- Hanging In (1979) – as Mona
- Hunter's Moon (1979)
- Little House on the Prairie: What Ever Happened to the Class of '56? (1980) – as Amy Phillips Sawyer
- The Sophisticated Gents (1981) – as Renee Marcus
- Command 5 (1985) – as Ann Bryan
- The Young and the Restless (1986) – as Beverly Stark
- Daytimes' Greatest Weddings (2004) – as Meredeth Lord Wolek
