= Connie Passalacqua Hayman =

American journalist and educator

Connie Passalacqua Hayman is an American journalist and educator. Passalacqua Hayman has written on a number of topics, but is noted for her reporting and critical analysis of daytime soap operas.

== Career ==
Passalacqua Hayman started her soap journalism career in 1980 as an assistant to newspaper columnist Jon-Michael Reed, "the first soap journalist to review soaps as theater and edit soap magazines for intelligent readers." She has since written about the daytime industry for various publications and news organizations, including Newsday, United Features Syndicate, The New York Times, Variety, the New York Daily News, TV Guide and USA Today. She was the editor of Afternoon TV magazine from 1980 to 1983, an editor for Soap Opera World and a contributor for Soap Opera Digest, Soap Opera People and others.

Between 1995 and 2001, Passalacqua Hayman was an adjunct professor of journalism at New York University, and in 2001 she left writing full-time to earn a master's degree in education at NYU. She taught journalism at Marymount Manhattan College as an adjunct professor in the Communications Department from 2007 to 2014.

=== Marlena De Lacroix ===
While writing for ABC's official soap magazine Episodes in 1989, Passalacqua Hayman was asked to be the critic for the new magazine Soap Opera Weekly. From its inception through 2001, she wrote critical analysis for Soap Opera Weekly under the pseudonym Marlena De Lacroix. Her column "Critical Condition" has been called "insightful, outspoken and humorous" and has been noted to have "created a sensation in the soap industry."

Passalacqua Hayman left Soap Opera Weekly in 2001, later resuming writing as De Lacroix in 2006 in a blog titled "Savoring Soaps" for entertainment site JackMyers.com. In 2007 she launched her own soap opera analysis website, MarlenaDeLacroix.com.
