= Jared Banks =

Fictional character on the drama One Life to Live

- One Life to Live character
- Portrayed by: John Brotherton
- Duration: 2007–10
- First appearance: August 10, 2007
- Last appearance: February 9, 2010
- Created by: Dena Higley; Ron Carlivati
- Introduced by: Frank Valentini
In-universe information
- Other names: Jared Buchanan; Jeb Stuart
- Occupation: Inmate; Co-owner of Brennan Winery and Vineyard; Executive for Buchanan Enterprises
- Parents: Charlie Banks; Valerie Banks
- Siblings: Jimmy Banks
- Spouse: Natalie Buchanan (2009)

Jared Banks is a fictional character on the American daytime drama One Life to Live. Originally slated to debut on August 17, 2007, the character, as portrayed by John Brotherton, first appeared a week earlier on August 10, 2007. Chris Bones played a young Jared in flashbacks on January 17, 2008. Jared died onscreen November 13, 2009, and with Brotherton last appearing onscreen as a vision February 9, 2010.

== Storylines ==
Jared Banks arrives in Llanview, Pennsylvania, holding a particular interest in the Buchanan family. He is first seen reading a book about Asa Buchanan, and soon tries to convince Natalie to give him a job at Buchanan Enterprises. She agrees to a game of billiards with a job as the prize, assuming that, as an expert, she will win. However, Jared distracts her and she loses.

Jared swindles Nash Brennan at a game of poker and buys Antonio Vega's shares of Nash's vineyard; it is revealed that he shares a secret past with Nash's wife, Jessica Buchanan. Jessica's former alternate personality, Tess, had been responsible for sending Jared to prison, thus ruining his chances at a good job. Jared wants revenge on Jessica, believing that she had set him up and not believing that "Tess" ever existed.

Asa dies soon after Jared's arrival in town. Jared befriends Asa's widow Renee, who claims to see much of her husband in Jared. Asa's son, Clint, and butler, Nigel, are suspicious of Jared's motives. Jared and Natalie are attracted to each other, but she also is less than trusting of his motives and angry at his manipulations with her family. Jared boldly kisses Natalie at work, and she fires him. Jared arrives at Nash and Jessica's cottage with proof that he owns it as part of his stake in the vineyard, and proceeds to move in.

To Natalie's chagrin, Jared kisses Sarah Roberts at Capricorn, and the Buchanans are shocked when Renee invites Jared to stay at Asa's mansion. Natalie warns Sarah about Jared, but Sarah is undeterred; when the time comes for the reading of Asa's will, Sarah invites Jared to come with her to Texas, which annoys Natalie, Jessica, and Nash.

In his will, Asa had revealed the existence of another son, but had left the man unnamed and had tasked Nigel to reveal his identity when the time was right. Jared overhears Nigel say that David Vickers is secretly Asa's son; knowing that Nigel is reluctant to tell the family that con artist David is one of them, Jared soon blackmails Nigel into convincing the family that he is Asa's long-lost son. Nigel initially refuses, but eventually gives in; he gives a forged letter to Asa's sons Clint and Bo in which Asa names Jared as his son. Despite his feelings for Natalie, Jared moves his plan forward; he pretends to act surprised at being Asa's son and even unhappy about the idea — though he secures some of David's hair to pass the inevitable DNA test. However, Jared's real father Charlie Banks — who has been searching for him — shows up at the mansion. Charlie, a recovering alcoholic, is apologetic for his failures as a parent and hopes to reconnect with his son; a bitter Jared is unwilling to let Charlie back in his life.

Asa's ex-wife Pamela Stuart is summoned to Llanview by Bo on January 18, 2008, and attends the Buchanan Enterprises board meeting to weigh in on the possibility that Jared is Asa's illegitimate son. Bo had determined that Asa had been with Pamela around the time of Jared's conception; Pamela confirms that Asa had never even met Jared's mother Valerie Banks, let alone conceived a child with her. To the shock of everyone assembled, Pamela reveals that Valerie had in fact been her sister; Pamela then drops the bombshell that she is actually Jared's biological mother. Afraid of losing Asa's love by bringing a child into the relationship, Pamela had asked Valerie to secretly adopt Asa's son. Pamela declares him the Buchanan heir; after the board meeting lets out, however, Pamela returns to meet with Jared alone. It is revealed that Pamela has lied to the Buchanans and is merely going along with Jared's scheme; Pamela is not really Jared's mother, but has known Jared and his family since he was a child, and had told the young boy many stories about her life with Asa. Through Pamela's stories of the great Asa Buchanan, Jared's fascination with Asa and the Buchanan clan had been born. Jared had not been aware that Pamela was going to appear at the meeting or lie for him, but Pamela explains that it was the least she could do "after everything my brother" — a violent abuser who dated Jared's mother after Charlie left the Banks household — "did to you and your family." Pamela, who still remembers Jared with fondness, warmly wishes him good luck with the company, and tells him that — whether he realizes it or not — what he is doing is not about the money or the power, but about the Buchanans, and their good name.

Jared and Natalie continue to fight their now-forbidden attraction to each other. Charlie is not happy with Jared's scheme, but vows to protect his son's secret as part of his attempt to reconcile with Jared. Soon Charlie, who is romantically involved with Natalie's mother Viki Davidson, notices Jared's attraction to Natalie and tells his son he can either be the Buchanan heir or be with Natalie — but not both.

In the February 15, 2008 episode, Jared indicates that he has at least one sibling when he relates to Charlie the abuse they and their mother had suffered after Charlie had left them. In the March 21, 2008 episode, Jared and Charlie discuss how during that time Jared's younger brother Jimmy had been hit by a car and killed. Though Valerie had told Charlie it had been an accident, Jared reveals that Jimmy had actually been overwrought because of their mother's abusive boyfriend; Jared blames himself for letting an upset Jimmy run out into the street.

In March 2008, Jared finally admits to a shocked Natalie that he is not a Buchanan and that David Vickers is. Jared hopes that he and Natalie can now be together, but she rejects him, deciding to keep his secret only to protect her family from David's greed. Eventually they fall into bed together on May 5, 2008. Jared later tells Natalie that Charlie is his father, and they agree to keep the secret to protect Viki and assure Charlie's sobriety.

On November 9, 2008, Charlie saves Jared and Natalie's lives from a bomb that Natalie's sister Jessica set when she was her dangerous alter, Tess had set. Jared thinks Charlie is dead and through tears, he tells Natalie he never got a chance to tell Charlie how much he loved him. Then, Charlie stumbles through the door, dusty and sooty but alive. Jared proposes to Natalie on Christmas morning 2008, and she agrees to be his wife. They marry privately on May 13, 2009. When someone is stalking Jessica to whom she thinks is her late husband Nash's spirit, John McBain suspects Jared as her stalker, much to Natalie's disapproval.

When Jared went missing, Natalie and Jessica flew to Napa Valley, California to find him and they soon found out about Mitch Laurence's return from the dead, where he held the three captive. John and Brody Lovett flew to the vineyard to rescue them and when, after Mitch lays down on his knees from John's orders, Mitch shoots Jared. Jared was immediately taken to the hospital, where he was later pronounced dead, breathing his last before he could finish telling Natalie something.
