= George Reinholt =

American actor (1940-2013)

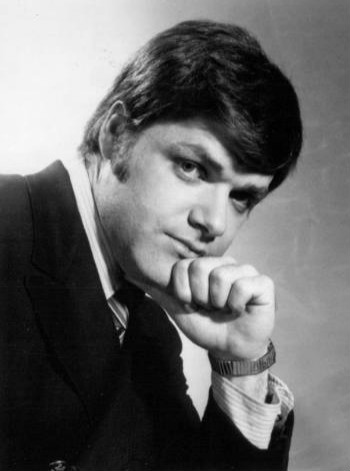
- Reinholt in 1971
- Born: George Kilpatrick Reinholt; August 22, 1940; Philadelphia, Pennsylvania, U.S.
- Died: November 11, 2013 (aged 73); Essington, Pennsylvania, U.S.
- Occupation: Actor

George Kilpatrick Reinholt (August 22, 1940 – November 11, 2013) was an American actor.

Reinholt played the character of Erik Fulda in The Secret Storm for a year starting in 1967.

His greatest fame came with two subsequent soap roles: Steve Frame on Another World from 1968 to 1975, and Tony Harris Lord on One Life to Live from 1975 to 1977.

After retiring from acting Reinholt swore off any comebacks in the medium. His resolve was weakened twice, once when he returned briefly for AW's 25th anniversary show in 1989, and another time when he considered returning in the mid-1990s. However he was not hired for any of the jobs he tested for.

In 1997 Reinholt placed an ad in a local paper offering his services to take women to parties or other events. Some of the press implied he was selling himself as an escort, in a sexual manner. Reinholt was furious and appeared on the Sally Jessy Raphael talk show to clear up the record.

On November 11, 2013 Reinholt died of cancer at his home in Essington, Pennsylvania at the age of 73.

== Filmography ==
Year	Title	Role	Notes
1967-1968	The Secret Storm	Erik Fulda	Daytime serial (contract role)
1968-1975; 1989	Another World	Steve Frame #1	Daytime serial (contract role 1967-1975; guest 1989)
1975-1977	One Life to Live	Tony Harris Kendall #1	Daytime serial (contract role)
1977	Looking Up	Stan	Feature film
1990	Monsters	Edward	Episode: "The Young and the Headless"
