= Blair Cramer =

- One Life to Live character
- Kassie DePaiva as Blair Cramer
- Portrayed by: Mia Korf (1991–1993); Kassie DePaiva (1993–2023)
- Duration: 1991–2013; 2023
- First appearance: October 10, 1991
- Last appearance: September 18, 2023
- Created by: Michael Malone
- Introduced by: Linda Gottlieb (1991); Frank Valentini (2012, 2023); Jennifer Pepperman (2013)
- Book appearances: Patrick's Notebook
- Crossover appearances: General Hospital
- Mia Korf as Blair Daimler Cramer
In-universe information
- Other names: Blair Daimler; Blair Manning; Blair McBain
- Occupation: Businesswoman; News reporter
- Family: Cramer
- Mother: Addie Cramer
- Spouse: Asa Buchanan (1992–1993); Todd Manning (1995–1997, 2001–2002, 2013–????) (Note: The first ceremony for Todd and Blair was in February 1995. The marriage was annulled months later in August. The second marriage between them took place in November of the same year until their divorced in 1997. However, they were married consecutively from 1995–1997.); Max Holden (1999–2001); Victor Lord, Jr. (2003–2004, 2007–2008) (Note: Both of Blair's marriages to Victor Lord, Jr. were when he was under the presumed alias of Todd Manning.); John McBain (2009); Elijah Clarke (2010); Martin Grey (backstory) (Note: Blair's marriage timeline to Martin Grey is unknown.)
- Children: Starr Manning Brendan Thornhart (stillborn) Jack Manning
- Adoptive children: Sam Manning
- Stepchildren: Danielle Manning
- Grandchildren: Hope Manning-Thornhart
- Grandparents: Lou Cramer; Sonya Roskova
- Aunts and uncles: Dorian Cramer Lord; Melinda Cramer
- First cousins: Cassie Callison; Adriana Cramer; Kelly Cramer; Paul Cramer; Langston Wilde (adoptive)

Blair Cramer is a fictional character from the American daytime drama series One Life to Live, played since 1993 by Kassie DePaiva. Introduced as the niece of lead antagonist Dr. Dorian Cramer Lord, the role was originated by Mia Korf from 1991 through 1993.

DePaiva played the role for nearly 20 years on ABC Daytime, from December 17, 1993, until the original OLTL finale episode January 13, 2012, and in several guest appearances on the last original ABC daytime serial General Hospital from March 2, 2012, through December 3, 2012.

DePaiva reprised the role when new regular episodes of OLTL debuted on Hulu, iTunes and FX Canada, via The Online Network from April 29, 2013, until August 19, 2013. In 2023, DePaiva again reprised the role on General Hospital, airing on September 15.

== Background ==
=== Casting ===
The role was originated by actress Mia Korf on October 10, 1991, who portrayed the character through January 29, 1993. Notably, Korf is a biracial actress of Japanese and Caucasian descent, while her successor DePaiva is Caucasian. References to the character's Asian cultural heritage disappeared once DePaiva assumed the role.

On January 11, 2012, it was announced DePaiva would bring her character, Blair Cramer, over to ABC's sole remaining soap opera, General Hospital. DePaiva and her alter-ego will be joined by long-time on-screen flame, Todd Manning, played by Roger Howarth, their daughter Starr Manning, played by Kristen Alderson and John McBain played by Michael Easton. All characters debuted in Port Charles in early 2012. On her official website, DePaiva confirmed her stint on GH would only be for a few select appearances and she is not planning to relocate to Los Angeles for a full-time gig. On June 1, 2012, Frank Valentini confirmed that DePaiva would return for several episodes during the summer. On October 1, 2012, Kassie revealed in her blog that she would be returning to GH for few episodes, and later appeared for episodes from November 27 through December 3, 2012.

On August 28, 2023, TVLine announced DePaiva would return to General Hospital for a "brief stint"; returning on September 15.

=== Reception ===
The initial 1994 pairing of actors Kassie DePaiva and Roger Howarth as Todd Manning and Blair Cramer on One Life to Live was met with fanfare and critical acclaim. This led production to focus on the actors and their character roles in front-burner storylines on the series through to the original television finale in 2012. Both DePaiva and Howarth, along with actress Kristen Alderson as their onscreen daughter Starr Manning, reprised the roles in-continuity on the ABC soap General Hospital in 2012, and DePaiva and Howarth again on One Life to Live upon its revival in 2013.

For her portrayal of Blair, DePaiva received a Daytime Emmy Award nomination for Outstanding Lead Actress in a Drama Series in 2005, losing her bid that year to fellow One Life to Live actress and onscreen sister-in-law Erika Slezak (Victoria Lord Davidson).

== Storylines ==
=== 1991–2004 ===
On October 10, 1991, Blair Daimler (Mia Korf) comes to fictional Llanview with a secret — she is the daughter of Dr. Dorian Lord's (Elaine Princi) as-yet-unmentioned older sister Agatha "Addie" Cramer (Pamela Payton-Wright), conceived when Addie was raped. Blair keeps Addie, mentally ill and institutionalized for years, hidden in her loft, and blames her Aunt Dorian for her mother's illness. Seeking revenge, Blair tries to ruin Dorian by getting her aunt's signature on a document confessing to the murder of Victor Lord in 1976. As it turns out, Dorian had been told Addie had died by their parents, who had institutionalized her.

Just after midnight on New Year's Day 1992, Blair meets Max Holden (James DePaiva), and the two lonely individuals soon fall passionately in love. However, Blair seeks to marry billionaire Asa Buchanan (Phil Carey) to gain the financial security and power she needs to care for her mother and destroy Dorian. A persistent Max woos Blair into having sex with him hours before her wedding to Asa on June 16, 1992 — literally on top of her wedding dress. Nevertheless, Blair marries Asa anyway. The union is a loveless one, and the marriage is clearly doomed when Blair feigns being pregnant to get her share of the Buchanan money. On Christmas Eve 1992, the argument that follows after he discovers Blair's deception, Asa has a heart attack and Blair leaves him on the floor to die (He is soon discovered by his ex-wife Renee Divine (Patricia Elliott) and recovers). During a divorce hearing in January 1993, Asa paid off a maid named Sunny to say she witnessed Max and Blair having sex in Blair's bedroom and as a result she was given no financial settlement by the judge. She in turn took off with money from Dorian's safe and left town on January 29, 1993. By the time Blair's marriage to Asa falls apart, Max has moved on to the new love of his life, Luna Moody (Susan Batten).

On December 17, 1993, Blair (Kassie DePaiva) was immediately tracked down in Florida by Victoria "Viki" Lord (Erika Slezak) and Sloan Carpenter (Roy Thinnes) to admit she tricked Dorian into signing a confession for killing Victor Lord. In 1994, Blair tries to use Max's ever-increasing gambling habit to split him up from Luna. Blair and Max spend a wild weekend in Atlantic City. Later, Blair accidentally hits Luna with her car and paralyzes her. Realizing he loves Luna, a sobered Max faces his addiction and ends his relationship with Blair, seemingly for good. Cord Roberts (John Loprieno) consoles a devastated Blair, and they fall into a romance.

In late 1994, Blair bonds with town pariah Todd Manning (Roger Howarth). After several drinks, they fall into bed. She discovers in 1995 Todd is the "secret Lord heir" — son of deceased millionaire Victor Lord and half-brother to heiress Viki Lord Carpenter — and scrambles to marry him to secure the money she needs to pay for Addie's care. She pretends to be pregnant with his child. They wed.

Todd buys a tabloid, The Intruder, and renaming it The Sun, he immediately sets himself as the rival to Viki's newspaper, The Banner. Blair falls for Todd and really becomes pregnant with his baby, but she is mugged and miscarries. Max reveals to Todd that Blair wasn't pregnant when they married. A furious Todd nearly rapes her. Their marriage in shambles, Blair discovers she is pregnant again. Ultimately, Todd has their union annulled.

By November 1995, Todd and Blair reunite and marry again. Todd travels to the Irish island of Inishcrag to make amends with Marty Saybrooke (Susan Haskell), the woman he had raped years before. Todd helps Marty's love, Patrick Thornhart (Thorsten Kaye), evade a terrorist group, but is mistaken for Patrick, shot, and presumed dead.

On New Year's Day 1996, a vengeful Blair vows to destroy Marty for her part in Todd's death. Blair gives birth to Todd's daughter Starr, and then decides to seduce Patrick to punish Marty. By now, Marty is engaged to Luna's brother Dylan Moody (Christopher Douglas), but still in love with Patrick. He resists his attraction to Blair, even as Marty marries Dylan. When Marty insists on staying with a paralyzed Dylan despite her feelings, Patrick finally falls into Blair's arms. As they have sex on the floor of her penthouse on August 16, 1996, a man watches from the shadows: Todd.

Todd later reveals himself, delighted with daughter Starr but vowing to punish an "unfaithful" Blair. She is overjoyed Todd is alive, but he soon engages her in a fierce custody battle for Starr. Though considering reuniting with Blair, Todd's anger is fueled by the revelation she is pregnant with Patrick's child. Baby Starr is diagnosed with aplastic anemia and needs a bone marrow transplant. Blair's unborn child is a match, but she is soon in a car accident; her child with Patrick is stillborn, and she names him Brendan. Unbeknownst to Blair, the other driver had been her young cousin Kelly Cramer (Gina Tognoni); after Kelly's role in the accident is revealed, she and Blair are at odds for some time. Alex Olanov (Tonja Walker) turns out to be a suitable donor for Starr. By now Todd and Blair are at war, and divorce in 1997.

Todd pays lawyer Téa Delgado (Florencia Lozano) $5 million to marry him in a bid to defeat Blair in the custody battle over Starr. Téa and Blair are soon at each other's throats. When Téa falls through a window during an argument with Blair, Todd is temporarily awarded full custody of Starr. By 1998, Blair wins back visitation rights to her daughter. She renews her relationship with Max, but breaks it off when she discovers Asa has paid Max to get information on her. Blair falls into the arms of Sam Rappaport (Laurence Lau); in love with Blair, Max proposes, but she turns him down.

Todd comes back to town in 2000 and helps Blair cover up the fact that she shot Max in the back in a moment of rage. Through this teamwork, Todd proposes to Blair and she accepts. However, Max tricks Todd into thinking that he and Blair had sex right before their wedding, and during the ceremony, Todd reveals that Blair shot Max. Although he realized he was wrong, Blair couldn't forgive him for giving over the evidence to the police. In 2001, Blair realizes she is pregnant. She believes that the baby is Max's but then finds out it's really Todd's. Blair doesn't tell Todd the truth. Blair decides to marry Max when Todd won't let her see Starr. Todd takes Starr away from Blair and says she can never see her again if she marries Max. Blair goes to Mexico to have her baby alone since she doesn't get to see Starr. Todd comes down Blair goes into premature labor. Todd delivers the baby, later named Jack, but he still believes the baby is Max's. Todd gets rid of the baby and tells Blair the baby is dead when really he is in the other room. Blair finally tells Todd the baby was his, and he struggles to get baby Jack back. He gives Blair the baby as a Christmas present, but doesn't tell her it's Jack. They remarry after growing closer. When Blair finds out the truth, she reams Todd out and they separate. Todd leaves town for a little while.

After Starr's nanny is killed in 2002, Blair is forced to go into hiding due to death threats she has gotten. Todd allows her to stay and hide at the penthouse so she can still see the children. They soon grow close again and admit their feelings. Todd proposes again. In the middle of their wedding, Sam reveals the truth, that Todd was behind the death threats. Todd insisted he had done it to get her back, but Blair takes the children and leaves.

Mitch Lawrence then kidnaps Blair, and in an attempt to save her, Todd brings Natalie to switch places with her. Once Blair is back home, she tells Todd she needs space, and that he needs to leave. This is the last conversation between Roger Howarth's Todd and Blair until 2011.

=== 2007–10 ===
In 2007, Blair remarries Todd (Trevor St. John) for the fifth time (in exchange for a Téa-inspired $5 million) to help his bid to win custody of his biological son Sam Manning (then known as "Tommy McBain"). Todd's child with Margaret Cochran (Tari Signor), Sam had been kidnapped by Todd's nemesis Dr. Spencer Truman (Paul Satterfield) shortly after birth and had been presumed dead. His son's existence revealed, Todd is desperate to take him back from his adopted parents, Dr. Michael (Nathaniel Marston) and Marcie McBain (Kathy Brier). Todd is awarded custody, but Marcie flees Llanview with the child.

In May 2008, Todd is in a car crash with Sam, who is not in a car seat. Blair is awarded custody of Sam. In August 2008, Todd and Blair have a custody battle over Sam; Blair is awarded custody once again. In December 2008, with Téa's help, Blair marries John McBain (Michael Easton) to gain custody of her kids, and they do. In March 2009, Blair is put in a coma after being stabbed by Powell Lord III (Sean Moynihan), later identified to be the same person who killed Lee Halpern (Janet Zarish), Wes Granger (Justin Paul Kahn) and Talia Sahid (BethAnn Bonner).

In July 2009, Blair divorces John despite Blair wanting an annulment. Also, Todd and Blair have a one-night stand in the cabana of La Boulaie. In August 2009, Blair sets out to find out Téa's deep, dark secret and hires Rex Balsom (John-Paul Lavoisier) as a private investigator to dig up information on Téa's missing Llanview years. He finds out Ross Rayburn (Michael Lowry), who tried to kidnap Blair's kids at Todd's order in 2002, is in Tahiti and was with a woman. Blair thinks the woman was Téa. In September 2009, she finds Ross. He tells her he is married to Téa.

In October 2009, when Blair tries to spoil Todd and Téa's wedding ceremony, Ross tricks her by taking her on a boat out on a Llanview bay to stop Blair from ruining the wedding. While on the boat, Ross gets Blair to admit she still has romantic feelings for Todd. They return to shore. Blair finally tells Todd about Téa's marriage to Ross. Later, Ross and Blair converse with each other about everything that has happened lately. Meanwhile, Téa is shunned by Todd after having a huge argument with him about the invalidity of their marriage and flees to La Boulaie to confront Blair about the matter. She badgers Téa to admit the truth about yet another secret. Téa confesses she has been hiding the fact she has a child with Todd. Blair tries to force Téa to tell this to Todd, but and Blair get into a physical altercation and when pulling at each other's hands they release. Tea and Blair are both flung back. Blair falls into the window onto the pool below.

Blair survives and decides to keep Téa's secret, only because she fears it will push her and Todd together. She is eventually kidnapped by Ross along with Téa and Todd's daughter, whom Ross believes to be his, Danielle Rayburn (Kelley Missal). Blair goes to great lengths during their capture to keep Danielle safe. Eventually they are rescued by Todd, Téa, Bo and Nora. At first it looks as though Todd killed Ross. It is later revealed he is alive. Blair then begins a friends with benefits relationship with Ross's brother, Elijah Clarke (Matt Walton). Blair also moves out of Dorian's La Boulaie mansion when Dorian begins to do the bidding of Mitch Laurence (Roscoe Born), unaware she is going along with his plans to ensure all the Cramer women's safety.

On May 6, 2010, Blair and Tea have a confrontation that forever changes their prior relationship as enemies. Blair made a copy of Tea's medical records. She found out Tea was going to die of a brain tumor, so she invited Tea over to her mansion to discuss Tea's illness, apologize for how she has treated Tea in the past, and offer to help however she can. However, Tea is initially furious to find out Blair has copied her medical files, and threatens to sue. Blair says Tea can fight her all she wants. Tea assumes Blair cannot wait for her to die, so she can return to her old flame—Todd Manning. Blair says she has no intention of getting back together with Todd, and says she does not want Tea to die. Tea tries to push Blair away, even physically. Blair fights to contain Tea. Tea breaks down in Blair's arms. They cry together, and Blair tells Tea she will help however she can. Subsequently, Blair convinces Tea to seek medical treatment for her tumor. Tea initially fights her on the subject, but eventually gives in. Later, Blair invites Tea and Danielle over to get ready for prom with Danielle's older sister Starr (Kristen Alderson). Blair and Tea spend some quality time together and bond once the kids leave for prom. Shortly thereafter, Blair takes Tea to her first radiation treatment. Several weeks later, Blair finds Tea passed out lying on the floor of her hotel room, and she gets her to the hospital. Blair promises to make sure Danielle is a part of her family, once Tea dies, and she comforts Tea. Weeks later, Tea calls Blair over to ask Blair to be Danielle's legal guardian in case something happens to Todd. Blair promises to always be there for Danielle. Blair and Tea share an emotional goodbye with a memorable montage of some of their history together.

On July 2, 2010, Elijah asks Blair to marry him. She then tells him she needs time to "think." They go to Tahiti where they run into Ross Rayburn. They were about to marry until Blair found out what Eli did. She shoots him, but the bullets are blanks. When Blair returns to Llanview, she is saddened to learn Tea has died. Blair makes Tea the funeral she thinks she would have wanted. In October, it is discovered Eli and Tea are alive. Eli comes back to Llanview and kidnaps Starr, Hope, and Dani. They go to Cherryvale to treat Eli, but in the staircases Eli finds Tea and takes her as well. Starr and Hope escape Eli are kidnapped once again by Hannah O'Connor (Meghann Fahy). Todd, Blair, John, and Bo (Robert S. Woods) face off with Eli at the warehouse. Eli wants Blair to run away with him so she listens and gets into the van, but sneakily leaves and goes in the warehouse looking for Starr and Hope. Instead, she is shocked to find Tea in the warehouse, and alive. Tea and Blair share an emotional reunion. Blair unties Tea and tells her they have to run because Eli will blow up the warehouse. Eli notices Blair is gone and blows up the warehouse with Tea and Blair inside it. Blair and Tea pick themselves up and try to find a way to get out of the warehouse. Todd and John go into the warehouse and try to find Blair and possibly Hope and Starr. Tea and Blair find John and Todd. They are all rescued.

=== 2011–12 ===
In 2011, Blair and Tea are supporting each other during a time of trouble- Todd has gotten shot. They bicker about Tea's brother Tomas Delgado (Ted King). It seems Tea is protecting Blair and doesn't want Tomas to date Blair. In early April 2011 Blair finds out Jack (Andrew Trischitta) has been bullying Shane Morasco (Austin Williams) causing him to try to jump off a roof to kill himself. Blair notices Jack does not feel sorry for what he did. In June 2011 Blair finds out Tomas has a wife named Yvette (LaChanze) and a son named Baz (Barret Helms) who he did not know about. In early July 2011, she finds out from John McBain that Gigi Morasco (Farah Fath) is dead from carbon monoxide poisoning after being locked in a basement by Jack and his friends. Todd tells Blair he paid off Brad's (Frank Dolce) dad (one of Jack's friend's) to confess to the whole thing.

On August 1, 2011, the man with Todd's original face (Howarth) arrives at the premiere and reveals himself to the family. Blair, Starr and Tea are stunned. Blair asks him where has he been in the past eight years. The man (simply known as "TM") says he was locked up, but doesn't know where. He says she, Starr, Jack and Tea have kept him alive all this time and he was coming to take his family back. TM kisses Blair, reminding her of their wedding back in 1995. While TM is taken into custody by John, Blair, Starr, and Tea are left to doubt if the man who has been Todd for the last eight years (St. John) is an imposter. Later, Blair is back at home telling Dorian (Robin Strasser) all about Todd and the man with Todd's old face. Dorian asks her if she was sure who the real Todd was. Blair only says the man with Todd's old look seems to act, smell, and talk like the real Todd used to. Blair then calls Tomas and says she wants to know everything about what really happened to Todd eight years ago.

It is revealed the man with the original face is Todd Manning. The other with the surgically altered face is actually Todd's identical twin, Victor Lord Jr. Todd tells Blair he blames her because she didn't try to find him while he fought to get back to her and their children. However, Todd wants to get back together with Blair, the love of his life. "You're the one", he tells her, in Viki's cabin, after he has been shot by his mother Irene. Blair nurses Todd back to health. While reminiscing about their checkered past, they almost share a kiss.

On New Year's, Todd kisses Blair. Blair admits she isn't ready to jump right in to a new relationship after Tomas. She asks Todd to promise he will never hurt her. He replies, "Hell, no!" and says he can't, but he can promise he loves her, and the kids. As Todd leaves that night, he kisses Blair on the neck. On January 12, 2012, Starr and Hope leave for Los Angeles- Jailbait has gone viral. Todd tears up next to Blair. She tells him that's the proof he's changed-he cares so much about his family. They kiss. On January 13, the finale of OLTL, they have sex. They lay there together until John McBain busts the bedroom door open and announces he is arresting Todd for Victor's murder, while Victor is shown very much alive, tied and gagged to a bed by Allison Perkins (Barbara Garrick) as the screen goes black.

A frantic Blair arrived in Port Charles, setting of sister soap General Hospital in March 2012, per the request of General Hospital staffer Epiphany Johnson (Sonya Eddy), due to Starr's car accident. She is told by Epiphany that Hope and Cole lost their lives in the wreck. Starr is in the dark concerning the losses. Blair breaks the news to a devastated Starr that Cole and Hope are gone. While in town, Blair met MetroCourt Hotel owner Carly Corinthos (Laura Wright). Together, they each drink and bond over their ex-husbands, and how wonderful their children are. They become friends and then go to the courthouse when they see Todd about to shoot resident mob boss Sonny Corinthos (Maurice Benard). Just then John McBain comes in from Llanview and has some type of connection with Sonny. Blair then takes Starr, returns to Llanview and awaits Todd's trial for the murder Victor.

In May 2012, Blair sends Téa to get Starr out of a legal mess- for holding a gun to Sonny, who she believed was responsible for killing Cole and Hope. Téa reveals to Starr that Blair could not come, due to Sam not feeling well. Blair returned to town on July 18, 2012, for the re-opening of The Haunted Star, where Starr will sing on a regular basis. When Todd proposes marriage to her, she confesses that she cannot marry Todd due to her engagement to Tomás. Blair calls Tomás to come home, but a CIA agent shows up, saying Tomás has left for another mission. Blair leaves with Téa and Skye to find Tomás.

=== 2013 ===
At the One Life to Live resumption in April 2013, Blair celebrates the grand re-opening her nightclub Capricorn as Shelter after renovations. Lord twin brothers and Blair's ex-husbands Todd (Howarth) and an alive Victor (St. John) crash the event just as Todd's daughter Danielle suffers a drug overdose and is rushed to the hospital. Todd and Blair reunite and marry for a fourth time.
