= Rachel Gannon =

- One Life to Live character
- Daphnée Duplaix Samuel as Rachel Gannon
- Portrayed by: Ellen Bethea (1992–1995, 2000–2005); Mari Morrow (1995–1996); Sandra P. Grant (1996–1998); Daphnée Duplaix (2009–2010)
- Duration: 1992–1998; 2000–2002; 2005; 2009–2010
- First appearance: May 20, 1992
- Last appearance: March 23, 2010
- Created by: Michael Malone
- Introduced by: Linda Gottlieb; Frank Valentini (2005)
- Crossover appearances: All My Children
- Ellen Bethea as Rachel Gannon

- Mari Morrow as Rachel Gannon
In-universe information
- Other names: Ricky; Roxy
- Occupation: Social worker; Music executive; Prostitute
- Father: Hank Gannon
- Mother: Nora Hanen
- Stepparents: Bo Buchanan (1995–99, 2010–); Daniel Colson (2005); Clint Buchanan (2009–10)
- Half-brothers: Matthew Buchanan
- Grandparents: Janine Gannon; Lenny Hanen; Selma Hanen
- Aunts and uncles: R. J. Gannon; Susannah Hanen
- Nephews: Drew Buchanan II
- First cousins: Keri Reynolds
- Other relatives: Jamie Vega

Rachel Gannon is a fictional character on the ABC soap opera One Life to Live. She is the daughter of attorneys Nora Hanen and Hank Gannon.

== Casting ==
Ellen Bethea originated the role from May 20, 1992 through January 18, 1995, by Mari Morrow from February 8, 1995, to January 23, 1996, and subsequently by Sandra P. Grant from April 30, 1996, through August 3, 1998. Bethea returned for brief appearances in 2000, 2001, 2002, May to June 2005 and October 2005. Daphnée Duplaix played the character from April 7, 2009, to March 23, 2010.

== Storylines ==
Rachel, the biracial daughter of divorced Llanview lawyers Hank Gannon and Nora Hanen, comes to town in 1992 after her father is named district attorney of Llantano County. She soon enrolls in Llanview University studying law, where she befriends Kevin Buchanan, who had recently gained custody of his infant son Duke. Rachel and Kevin eventually begin a romantic relationship; their romance falls apart in 1993 as Kevin is wrongly accused of being a participant in the gang rape of Marty Saybrooke, a case in which Hank is the prosecutor, and Nora is the defense counsel for one of the suspects, Todd Manning.

In 1995, Rachel's law studies falter, and she develops a dependency on prescription drugs, using her relationship with Dr. Ben Price to forge prescriptions. Feeling the pressure needing to live up to the reputation of her parents, her addiction advances to illegal drugs; Rachel obtains heroin from a drug dealer who works for her uncle, R.J. Gannon. Soon realizing that Rachel has a drug problem, R.J. stages an intervention, and Rachel checks herself into St. Anne's for rehabilitation. She later escapes, and the family eventually tracks her to New York City, where she is mixed up in drugs and prostitution. During the family strife, the question of Rachel's paternity is raised when R.J. reveals he and Nora had a one-night stand before she married Hank; it's eventually confirmed that Hank is her father, and Rachel mends her relationship with her parents. Rachel recommits herself to recovery and begins working in the music business alongside her uncle R.J., then befriends Téa Delgado, only for Téa to fall in love with her old enemy Todd.

When Nora is in need of an assistant in late 1997, Rachel recommends Georgie Phillips, an old friend from law school. Upon taking the job, Georgie meets Nora's husband Bo Buchanan, who she develops a psychotic fixation on. Georgie becomes obsessed with stealing Nora's life and taking Bo for herself, alleging that she and Bo have been having an affair. During an angry confrontation with Rachel in the spring of 1998, Georgie grows increasingly unhinged, assaulting her and threatening Nora's life. Rachel bludgeons Georgie to death in self-defense, then attempts to cover up her crime, and stays silent as Todd is fingered for the murder. When Todd unearths the truth and traps most of Llanview at the Buchanan family lodge, Rachel confesses. Nora is desperate to keep her daughter from going to jail, but Rachel has resigned herself to serving her time. Rachel is convicted of manslaughter and sent to Statesville Prison for a brief prison term; after her release, she moves back to Chicago and becomes involved in social work. She visits Llanview several times in the early 2000s, including when Nora was believed to be dead, and for her wedding to Daniel Colson.

Rachel returns to Llanview on April 7, 2009, after her half-brother Matthew Buchanan is paralyzed in a car accident. Though she is working as a drug counselor in Chicago, Rachel announces her plans to stay in town indefinitely, and accepts a local counseling job. Her first client is Cole Thornhart, her mother's former ward and Marty's son, who had been responsible for Matthew's accident. Rachel guides Cole through his arduous recovery, then begins a romance with bodyguard Shaun Evans. She quickly deduces that her mother is still in love with Bo and not with Clint, whom she eventually marries. Shaun tells Rachel he loves her, as he goes into surgery following his shooting, he then falls into a coma. Rachel is left guilt-ridden as she kissed Greg and was planning on breaking up with Shaun. She and Shaun then end their relationship and Rachel succumbs to her attraction for Greg and they begin dating. Unfortunately for Rachel and Greg, the two broke up in March 2010 when Greg thought Rachel was having feelings for her friend Schuyler Joplin (which she doesn't) and walked out on her. Feeling she doesn't have anything left in Llanview, Rachel moved back to Chicago to help a friend who is a patient in rehab.

When her mother remarries Bo, Nora chooses Rachel as her maid of honor. However, Rachel informs her mother that she will be un-able to attend the ceremony because she will be stuck in Chicago.

== Reception ==
Daphnée Duplaix earned an NAACP Image Award nomination for Best Actress in a Drama Series in 2010 her portrayal of Rachel.
