= List of One Life to Live characters introduced in the 1990s =

This is a list of characters from the American ABC Daytime soap opera, One Life to Live.

== Nigel Bartholomew-Smythe ==
Nigel Bartholomew-Smythe
- One Life to Live character
- Portrayed by: Richard Willis (1988–1989); Richard Hunderup (1990–1991); Peter Bartlett (1991–2013)
- Duration: 1988–2013
- First appearance: 1988
- Last appearance: August 5, 2013
- Created by: S. Michael Schnessel
- Introduced by: Paul Rauch (1988); Jennifer Pepperman (2013)
In-universe information
- Occupation: Buchanan family butler
- First cousins: Neville Smythe

Nigel Bartholomew-Smythe is a fictional character on the American soap opera One Life to Live. Peter Bartlett played the role from May 1991 until the series ended on January 13, 2012. He returned to the role on April 29, 2013. Nigel is the longtime butler and confidante of billionaire Asa Buchanan. In 2009, Barlett began also playing the role of Nigel's cousin, Neville Smythe.

In early 2003, Nigel is romantically linked to Roxy Balsom.

In October 2006, David Vickers finds out that Asa once had an affair with David's mother, Emma Bradley, but Asa denies it. Later, David's brother Spencer Truman claims to be Asa's son, but a DNA test proves otherwise. A conversation between Asa and Nigel hints that there is more to the story. On August 16, 2007, Asa dies in his sleep and is found by Nigel. At the funeral on August 17, 2007, Nigel tells a returned Max Holden that Asa has another son: David Vickers. Max advises Nigel to wait to tell the rest of the family; meanwhile, an eavesdropping Alex Olanov seeks out David. Nigel inherits Asa's yacht and private island, but in his video will & testament, Asa announces the existence of his other son. Nigel is tasked to inform this son of his parentage "when the time is right." Alex returns, married to an in-the-dark David, and blackmails Nigel with the facts of David's parentage. Not wanting the Buchanans to discover that con man David is one of them, Nigel gives his inheritance to Alex in exchange for her silence. Nigel has a cousin, Neville, who is the Buchanan mansion butler to the Buchanans living in London, England. Nigel later becomes a butler to Clint Buchanan, his wife Nora Buchanan, Clint's brother Bo Buchanan, and Bo and Nora's son Matthew Buchanan after Asa gives the Buchanan Mansion to Nora in his will. After Clint and Nora divorce in 2010, Nigel works solely for Clint after Clint wins ownership of the mansion from Nora in their divorce settlement. In the spring of 2011, Clint has a heart attack. After, he is blackmailed by his mentally ill daughter Jessica Buchanan's then husband and con artist Cutter Wentworth. Cutter demands a piece of Clint's fortune and the deed to the Buchanan Mansion in exchange for committing Jessica to St. Anne's. As a result, Clint loses ownership of the mansion to Cutter, and Nigel then works as Cutter's butler, along with his house guests Vimal Patel and his wife Rama Patel. Cutter later loses ownership of the mansion when Rex Balsom blackmails his estranged father Clint for the entire Buchanan fortune and the mansion in exchange for Clint to get the heart of Rex's dead fiancée Gigi Morasco. Clint then enlists Nigel to evict Cutter, Vimal, and Rama out of the mansion on June 28, 2011. On July 8, 2011, Rex fires Nigel as the mansion's butler, citing he can't trust Nigel because of his friendship with Clint. Nigel is later hired by Clint to be his butler/confidante when he is placed under house arrest at Llanfair.

== Duke Buchanan ==
Duke Buchanan
- One Life to Live character
- Portrayed by: Matthew Metzger (2004–06); (and child actors)
- Duration: 1992–94; 2004–06
- First appearance: June 29, 1992
- Last appearance: May 22, 2006
- Created by: Josh Griffith; Michael Malone
- Introduced by: Linda Gottlieb; Frank Valentini (2004)
- Crossover appearances: All My Children
In-universe information
- Occupation: Executive for Buchanan Enterprises
- Family: Lord; Riley; Buchanan (adoptive)
- Parents: Kevin Riley Buchanan; LeeAnn Demerest
- Half-brothers: Kevin Buchanan Jr.
- Sons: Zane Buchanan
- Grandparents: Joe Riley; Victoria Lord; Clint Buchanan (adoptive); Duann Demerest
- Aunts and uncles: Megan Gordon; Cord Roberts (adoptive); Megan Craig Riley; Joey Riley Buchanan; Rex Balsom (adoptive); Jessica Buchanan Natalie Buchanan
- First cousins: Shane Balsom (adoptive); Bree Brennan; Ryder Ford; Liam McBain

Adam and Connor O'Brien (1992)
David and Michael DeFranco (December 1993 – January 1994)
Matthew Metzger (August 23, 2004 – May 22, 2006)

Demerest "Duke" Buchanan is a fictional character on the American soap opera One Life to Live. He is the son of Kevin Buchanan and LeeAnn Demerest. On the rebound from a failed romance with Stephanie Hobart, Kevin becomes involved with LeeAnn. They sleep together and LeeAnn becomes pregnant; Kevin finds out in 1992, and he and LeeAnn elope. Their son Duke is born in 1992, but their marriage crumbles over her closeness with Jason Webb. Kevin and LeeAnn divorce, and at one point in the fierce custody battle LeeAnn insists Duke is Max Holden's son. LeeAnn ultimately leaves town for Texas with Duke in 1993.

In 2004, Kevin is married to Kelly Cramer; they become involved in a messy divorce and an even messier custody battle over their son Ace. Somewhat bitter over Kevin's lack of participation in his life so far, an adult Duke comes to town to attend business school and sides with Kelly, even testifying for her in court. Kevin and Kelly's marriage completely collapses when Kevin discovers that Kelly had miscarried their biological child, adopted another baby illegally, and passed him off as theirs; Ace turns out to have been stolen from his biological mother, and a devastated Kevin and Kelly return him.

Meanwhile, Duke has begun a relationship with Adriana Cramer; her mother Dorian Lord has hated the Buchanans for decades and despises the match. But when Adriana breaks up with Duke over her increasing feelings for Rex Balsom, Duke turns to alcohol and admits to Kelly that he has fallen in love with her. She convinces him that his feelings are not real, and they part. Later on in the St. James Church rectory, Duke again comes across Kelly, distraught from a horrible argument with Kevin. Their emotions get the best of them and they have sex, but a tornado hits and they are buried under debris. Critically injured, Duke and Kelly are rushed to Llanview Hospital, where a shortage of surgeons puts Kevin in the impossible position of choosing who will be operated on first. He chooses Kelly, who he is told by the doctors is in more desperate need. Kevin is devastated when Duke dies on May 15, 2006, before he can be brought into surgery.

Initially blaming Kelly for Duke's death, Kevin goes off the deep end when he learns that Kelly is pregnant with Duke's child. Having both had fertility issues in the past, Kevin and Kelly begin to view the pregnancy as a blessing, and are brought closer together. Kevin is by Kelly's side when Duke's son Zane Buchanan is born on October 31, 2006. Kelly accepts Kevin's invitation to accompany him to London, where they can start over and raise Zane together.

== Megan Buchanan-Rappaport ==
Megan Rappaport
- One Life to Live character
- Portrayed by: Erin Torpey (2008)
- Duration: 1999, 2008
- First appearance: June 2, 1999
- Last appearance: July 22, 2008
- Introduced by: Jill Farren Phelps; Frank Valentini; (Note: Executive producer Phelps originally introduced the role of Megan in 1999, when the character was stillborn. In 2008, executive producer Valentini notably introduced Torpey as an adult form of Megan.)
In-universe information
- Occupation: Actress
- Family: Lord; Buchanan
- Parents: Will Rappaport; Jessica Buchanan
- Half-brothers: Ryder Ford
- Half-sisters: Bree Brennan; Chloe Brennan
- Grandfathers: Clint Buchanan; Sam Rappaport
- Grandmothers: Victoria Lord; Lindsay Rappaport
- Uncles: Cord Roberts; Kevin Buchanan; Joey Buchanan; Rex Balsom
- Aunts: Megan Gordon; Natalie Buchanan; Jennifer Rappaport
- Other relatives: Asa Buchanan

Megan Victoria Buchanan-Rappaport is a fictional character on the American soap opera One Life to Live. She is the stillborn daughter of Will Rappaport and Jessica Buchanan. Erin Torpey played the role on July 21–22, 2008, as the spirit of Megan. Torpey had also portrayed Jessica when Megan died in 1999.

Conceived during a brief fling between Will and Jessica, Megan is stillborn on June 2, 1999 after Dorian Lord accidentally hits a pregnant Jessica with her car. A devastated Jessica ultimately forgives a repentant Dorian. Megan is named after her deceased aunt, Megan Gordon, who appears to Jessica in a vision to bring baby Megan to Heaven. On July 21 and July 22, 2008, the spirit of an adult Megan visits Jessica's mother Victoria Lord Davidson, who is critically injured in a car crash. Megan is happy to meet her grandmother and encourages her to forgive her love interest Charlie Banks. Megan also reveals that she is an actress, working with her aunt Megan as well.

== Andrew Carpenter ==
Andrew Carpenter
- One Life to Live character
- Portrayed by: Wortham Krimmer
- Duration: 1991–2010
- First appearance: August 23, 1991
- Last appearance: March 1, 2010
- Created by: Michael Malone
- Introduced by: Linda Gottlieb
- Book appearances: Patrick's Notebook
In-universe information
- Occupation: Rector; Chairman of the Carpenter Foundation
- Parents: Sloan Carpenter; Rebecca Carpenter
- Siblings: William Carpenter
- Spouse: Cassie Callison (1993–97)
- Children: William Sloan Carpenter (stillborn)
- Adoptive children: River Carpenter
- Aunts and uncles: John Carpenter
- First cousins: Maggie Carpenter; Ian Armitage; Mark Carpenter

Reverend Andrew Carpenter is a fictional character on the American soap opera One Life to Live. The role was played by Wortham Krimmer from October 1991 until March 1, 2010. In 1999, Krimmer was downgraded to recurring status.

Andrew Carpenter first appears in Llanview to take over St. James, an Episcopalian church, in October 1991. He meets and quickly falls in love with ailing Megan Harrison and helps find her husband Jake Harrison before she dies from lupus. Andrew begins dating Cassie Callison. Around the same time he begins counseling Llanview University party girl Marty Saybrooke.

Andrew's father Sloan arrives in town, first appearing in 1992. He is a widower and a retired four-star general turned author. Sloan had another son William, who had died of AIDS several years earlier. Sloan and William were estranged because of William's homosexuality. Sloan's relationship with Andrew, because of his contempt of William, is also strained. While writing a biography of deceased millionaire publisher Victor Lord, Sloan meets and becomes involved with Victor's daughter Victoria Lord and makes an enemy in Dorian, who is furious that Sloan's book hinted that her implicit negligence killed Victor.

Marty develops a crush on Andrew and aggressively tries to seduce him. Andrew rejects her and she decides to get back at him by accusing him of being a pedophile. In a storyline that predated the real-life Catholic Church sex abuse scandal, Marty tells the parents of closeted teenager Billy Douglas (who Andrew was counseling) that she saw him seduce Billy. Llanview is torn apart by the accusation. Andrew is vindicated, but he does not disclose whether or not he is gay which leads to further controversy. He becomes the target of hate crimes and members of his congregation demand he be ousted.

Andrew carries on and preaches love and tolerance. He brings the AIDS quilt project to Llanview, coinciding with a large donation to the project by ABC in order to show the quilt on-air. At the quilt ceremony, Billy publicly comes out as gay, a groundbreaking plot turn as gay characters were rarely seen at the time. The crisis serves to bring Andrew and Sloan to reconciliation and for Sloan to finally accept William's sexuality.

"I feel a big responsibility to make it work. We read about homophobia every day in the newspapers, but it's informational, not emotional. These scenes really hit you hard."

— Wortham Krimmer on OLTL's 1992 homosexuality story arc

Executive Producer at the time Linda Gottlieb explained to Entertainment Weekly, "Some people will be alienated; we'll get vicious mail. But I hope that by seeing a young gay boy, getting to like him, and sympathize with his pain, audiences will understand the hurt that awful jokes, dumb remarks, and exclusionary behavior can cause. We have an hour every day — what better place to explore this than daytime?" In the same interview, newcomer at the time Phillippe stated it was "the first time ever that I didn't have to force tears. My voice went all quivery and they just flowed out of me." The story arc proved to be well received when it won the series' first GLAAD Award for Best Daytime Drama. Neil Tadken credited the storyline as his inspiration for creating the Day of Compassion, an annual day all participating soap operas mentioned HIV or AIDS.

In May 1993, he comes to the aid of the woman who started the rumors against Andrew the previous year: Marty Saybrooke. After she is gang-raped by Todd Manning, Powell Lord III, and Zachary Rosen at the KAD Spring Fling, she runs to Andrew at the Rectory, and he helps her get through it. He takes her to get a rape exam, and urges her to press charges. He is a witness at the trial, and he and Cassie stayed with Marty after the rape occurred.

Andrew and Cassie marry in January 1993 and find out they are pregnant shortly after the wedding. Tragically, the baby dies at birth and Cassie is left unable to have children. Cassie finds an abandoned baby boy and brings him home. They name him William and plan to adopt him. The birth mother is revealed to be a teenager named Beth Garvey and she demands the baby back. The Carpenters are heartbroken to lose him. After Beth dies, Andrew and Cassie adopt the baby who is now named River.

Andrew grows close with Marty again and soon realizes he has developed reciprocal feelings for her. The pair come dangerously close to sleeping together, but they stop when they realize what it will do Cassie. Sloan becomes seriously ill and Andrew officiates his wedding to Vicki while he is hospitalized. Sloan sadly dies soon afterward.

For a short spell, the Carpenters enjoy a nice, quiet life. Cassie works as a journalist at The Banner and Andrew continues his work as a reverend. In 1997, Cassie and Andrew split up after Cassie cuckolds him with Kevin Buchanan. Cassie goes on to marry Kevin before departing Llanview in 1999.

Reverend Carpenter progressively appears infrequently in every year of the 2000s, primarily serving as minister for town religious functions. In 2009, he last officiates the marriage of his stepmother Viki to Charlie Banks, and is last shown in 2010.

== Maggie Carpenter ==
Maggie Carpenter
- One Life to Live character
- Portrayed by: Crystal Chappell
- Duration: 1995–97
- First appearance: October 3, 1995
- Last appearance: September 29, 1997
- Created by: Michael Malone
- Introduced by: Susan Bedsow Horgan
In-universe information
- Occupation: Teacher for the deaf
- Parents: John Carpenter; Eleanor Armitage
- Siblings: Mark Carpenter; Ian Armitage
- Uncles: Sloan Carpenter
- First cousins: Andrew Carpenter; William Carpenter

Maggie Carpenter is a fictional character on the American soap opera One Life to Live. The role was played by actress Crystal Chappell from October 1995 through September 1997.

The first cousin of Andrew Carpenter, Maggie arrives in Llanview in 1995. Maggie is introduced as a former wild child seeking a new start by becoming a nun, but she soon falls in love with Max Holden instead. Part of her motivation for becoming a nun is to spite her Protestant minister father John, who constantly belittled her. After leaving the church and getting involved with Max, Maggie tries to open a "circus arts" school in Llanview, but the plan is sabotaged by Max. Feeling betrayed, Maggie leaves town in 1997.

== River Carpenter ==
River Carpenter
- One Life to Live character
- Portrayed by: Alexander and Zachary Bliss (1994–1995); Ryan Marsini (1996–1999); Matthew Twining (2003–2004)
- Duration: 1993–1999; 2003–2004
- First appearance: December 24, 1993
- Last appearance: August 3, 2004
- Created by: Josh Griffith and Michael Malone
- Introduced by: Linda Gottlieb (1993); Frank Valentini (2003)
In-universe information
- Occupation: Musician
- Family: Cramer (adoptive)
- Mother: Beth Garvey
- Adoptive parents: Andrew Carpenter; Cassie Callison
- Brothers: William Sloan Carpenter (adoptive)
- Grandparents: Sloan Carpenter (adoptive); Rebecca Carpenter (adoptive); David Reynolds (adoptive); Dorian Cramer Lord (adoptive); Herb Callison (adoptive)
- Aunts and uncles: Adriana Cramer (adoptive); Langston Wilde (adoptive)

William Sloan River "River" Carpenter is a fictional character on the American soap opera, One Life to Live. Originally played by a number of child actors, Matthew Twining played River as a teenager from July 7, 2003, until August 3, 2004. River is the adopted son of Andrew Carpenter and Cassie Callison.

== Sloan Carpenter ==
Sloan Carpenter
- One Life to Live character
- Portrayed by: Roy Thinnes
- Duration: 1992–95
- First appearance: April 22, 1992
- Last appearance: January 16, 1995
- Created by: Josh Griffith; Michael Malone
- Introduced by: Linda Gottlieb
In-universe information
- Occupation: United States Army general
- Siblings: John Carpenter
- Spouse: Rebecca Carpenter (pre-1994); Victoria Lord (1994–95)
- Children: Andrew Carpenter; William Carpenter
- Stepchildren: Megan Gordon; Kevin Buchanan; Joey Buchanan; Jessica Buchanan; Natalie Buchanan
- Grandchildren: River Carpenter (adoptive)
- Nieces and nephews: Maggie Carpenter; Ian Armitage; Mark Carpenter

Sloan Carpenter is a fictional character on the American soap opera One Life to Live. The role was played by actor Roy Thinnes from April 1992 until the character's onscreen death in 1995.

Andrew's father Sloan arrives in town, first appearing in 1992. He is a widower and a retired four-star general turned author. Sloan had another son William, who had died of AIDS several years earlier. Sloan and William were estranged because of William's homosexuality. His relationship with Andrew, because of his contempt of William, is also strained. While writing a biography of deceased millionaire publisher Victor Lord, Sloan meets and becomes involved with Victor's daughter Victoria Lord and makes an enemy in Dorian, who is furious that Sloan's book hinted that her implicit negligence killed Victor.

Dr. Dorian Lord discovers that Victoria (who is married to Clint Buchanan) and General Carpenter have secretly left Llanview to have a weekend in another town.

Victoria later divorces Clint and marries Sloane, who later passes away.

== Addie Cramer ==
Addie Cramer
- One Life to Live character
- Portrayed by: Pamela Payton-Wright
- Duration: 1991–99; 2001–05; 2007–12
- First appearance: December 20, 1991
- Last appearance: January 12, 2012
- Created by: Michael Malone
- Introduced by: Linda Gottlieb
In-universe information
- Family: Cramer
- Parents: Lou Cramer; Sonya Roskova
- Sisters: Dorian Cramer; Melinda Cramer
- Husband: David Vickers (2008)
- Children: Blair Cramer
- Grandchildren: Starr Manning; Jack Manning; Sam Manning (adoptive)
- Aunts: Betsy Cramer
- Nieces and nephews: Cassie Callison; Adriana Cramer; Kelly Cramer; Paul Cramer; Langston Wilde (adoptive)

Agatha "Addie" Cramer (formerly Vickers) is a fictional character on the American soap opera One Life to Live. She is the older sister of Dorian Lord and mother to Blair Cramer, and was portrayed by Pamela Payton-Wright from December 1991 through the series finale in 2012.

Blair comes to Llanview in 1991 with a secret: she is the daughter of Dorian's older sister, Addie. Mentally ill and institutionalized for years, Addie is now hidden in Blair's loft. Blair blames Dorian for her mother's illness and her own childhood in foster care; Blair is apparently the result of Addie's rape at the hands of an unknown man in the sanitarium. Seeking revenge, Blair tries to ruin Dorian by getting her aunt's signature on a document confessing to the murder of her husband, Victor Lord, in 1976. Blair then plots to marry Asa Buchanan to gain the financial security and power she needs to care for her mother and destroy Dorian. It is revealed that Dorian had been told that Addie had died by their parents, who had institutionalized her. Blair and Dorian reconcile, and Dorian is tearfully reunited with Addie. Addie is placed in St. Ann's sanitarium for full-time care, but is visited often by her family.

Addie surprises the Cramers on Christmas Eve, 2007, when she appears at Dorian's home. Apparently recovered due to a new medication, Addie is anxious to make up for lost time. She sets things straight with on-again, off-again son-in-law Todd Manning and flirts with Dorian's new friend, Charlie Banks. Addie is relieved by her assessment that Dorian is no longer a "Viki wanna-be," reminding Dorian of her persistent use of the Lord name, "running a newspaper like hers, naming your house," and shared romantic partners, as well as Dorian's romance with Viki's son, Joey.

In June 2008, Addie reveals that she has married Dorian's ex-husband, David Vickers, but her torrid "friends with benefits" relationship with David comes to a swift end when she realizes he still carries a torch for Dorian; they part amicably.

With Dorian's departure in August 2011, Addie becomes the matriarch of the Cramer family in Llanview.

== Grace Davidson ==
Grace A Davidson
- One Life to Live character
- Portrayed by: Susan Misner (1999); Bailey Malik-Picciotti (1999)
- First appearance: March 12, 1999
- Last appearance: November 3, 1999
- Introduced by: Jill Farren Phelps
In-universe information
- Other names: Grace Monroe
- Brothers: Ben Davidson; Sam Rappaport
- Nieces and nephews: Will Rappaport; Jennifer Rappaport

Grace Davidson (previously Monroe) is a fictional character on the American soap opera One Life to Live. The role was portrayed by Susan Misner from March 12, 1999, until November 17, 1999. Bailey Malik played the character during flashbacks to her childhood.

Kelly Cramer's boarding school friend Grace Monroe comes to Llanview with her grandfather in 1999 and soon becomes romantically involved with Kevin Buchanan. Grace's grandfather, secretly a mobster, is searching for Ben Davidson to kill him because Grace's father had died while Ben was treating him. Meanwhile, Rae Cummings returns to town in search of her missing husband Daniel Faulkner; her one lead is Daniel's former mistress: Grace. Hating Grace for the affair, Rae tries to convince Kevin to end the relationship. He is upset by Grace's past but forgives her, so Rae slowly tries to lead Kevin to believe that Grace is a horrible woman. Rae complicates their relationship, but Kevin and Grace grow closer and are eventually engaged.

Ben is shot but survives, and it is revealed that Grace is really the younger sister of Ben and his brother Sam Rappaport, kidnapped as a child by the mob and presumed dead. Grace's childhood nickname is "Maisy" – short for "Amazing Grace." It is through the memories associated with the nickname – which Ben and Sam continue to use – that Ben and Sam realize that Grace is their sister. Reunited with her brothers, Grace changes her name to Grace Davidson.

At Kevin and Grace's engagement party, Kevin's grandfather Asa Buchanan, who hates Ben and Sam, confronts Grace with pictures he had uncovered of her sleeping with her father's mob friends. An upset Grace runs out into the storm and ends up in the Buchanans' summer house, which is under construction. Locked in, she falls through a hole in the floor into the cold water below. Rae arrives and unsuccessfully tries to save Grace; the two women make peace and Grace tells Rae that Daniel is in Pine Valley. Both women are eventually pulled from the water, but despite Ben's best efforts, Grace dies on November 3, 1999.

== Roseanne Delgado ==
Roseanne Delgado
- One Life to Live character
- Portrayed by: Erika Page
- Duration: 1998–2001
- First appearance: July 22, 1998
- Last appearance: July 24, 2001
- Created by: Pamela K. Long
- Introduced by: Jill Farren Phelps
In-universe information
- Occupation: Receptionist for the Llanview Police Department
- Parents: Enrique Montoya; Anna Rose Delgado
- Spouse: Cristian Vega (2000)
- Grandparents: Leon Delgado; Anna Delgado
- Aunts and uncles: Jose Delgado; Téa Delgado; Tomás Delgado
- First cousins: Danielle Manning; Baz Moreau; Victor Lord III

Roseanne Delgado (formerly Vega) is a fictional character on the American soap opera One Life to Live. She was portrayed by Erika Page from July 22, 1998, through July 24, 2001.

Roseanne arrived in Llanview as a mystery woman on an airplane with Will Rappaport in April 1998. Her presence intrigued him. Roseanne's arrival in Llanview was solely for the purpose of getting back her "soulmate", Cristian Vega.

Cris was shocked to see Roseanne appear in his apartment and soon realized she was the answer to his modeling project. Roseanne quickly agreed to pose nude for Cris, hoping that he would actually look at her and become interested in her.

Roseanne's arrival in Llanview also shocked her aunt, Téa Delgado. When asked by Téa if she would like to move to a hotel with Téa, Roseanne quickly decided to stay in Angel Square with Carlotta (a friend to her mother). When Cristian broke up with his girlfriend, Jessica Buchanan and moved to New York City to go to art school, Roseanne went with him and soon they became lovers. When Cris' art school scholarship was revoked, Roseanne convinced Will to send her money to pay for the tuition and keeping Cristian in New York, away from Jessica.

Roseanne eventually convinced Cristian to marry her and they did get married, although she had to lock Jessica in a closet to prevent her from interrupting the ceremony. But Jessica got out and arrived right after the ceremony and informed Cris what Roseanne had done, getting the money from Will to keep Cristian in NY and away from Jessica. Cristian was furious and wanted to get an annulment right away, but Roseanne was determined and hung on for months until she was finally convinced by Cris' brother, Antonio, to agree to the annulment.

Roseanne then fell in love with Antonio, despite the fact that he wanted to keep their relationship fun and without commitment, which she had agreed to. Roseanne was also threatened by the presence of Sophia Pelligrino, Antonio's partner, who is also in love with him. After Roseanne took the receptionist job at the police station, one day Sophia called in for help and asked her to send Antonio. Roseanne, thinking it was just a ploy to get Antonio's attention, didn't pass on the message. Antonio was furious when he found out because Roseanne could have cost Sophia her life. Angry and hurt, Roseanne agreed to become R.J.'s mole at the police station and provide any useful information. Roseanne soon regretted the decision because Antonio came to her and agreed to try to start their relationship from the beginning. Before this, however, Roseanne had gotten drunk and went home with Colin MacIver and slept with him. Not only that, she revealed that she's R.J.'s source at the police station and Colin is using that information to blackmail Roseanne. She later left town in 2001 after Colin's murder.

== Madame Delphina ==
Madame Delphina
- One Life to Live character
- Portrayed by: Lea DeLaria
- Duration: 1999; 2008–09; 2011
- First appearance: March 10, 1999
- Last appearance: December 30, 2011
- Introduced by: Jill Farren Phelps (1999); Frank Valentini (2008)
In-universe information
- Occupation: Psychic

Madame Delphina is a fictional character on the American soap opera One Life to Live. Lea DeLaria first played the role in 1999, then again from June 30 to August 28, 2008, on January 15, 2009, July 27, 2009, and from August through December 2009. In 2011, she reprised the role starting on May 26, 2011, and appeared sporadically until December 30, 2011. She also portrayed Delphina's counterpart, Professor Delbert Fina Jr., in 2008 and from December 20–23, 2011.

Dorian Lord consults psychic Madame Delphina in 1999 following the death of Dorian's husband, Mel Hayes. Through Delphina, Mel's spirit chastises Dorian for accidentally running over Jessica Buchanan and fleeing the scene, and advises Dorian to make peace with her longtime nemesis Victoria "Viki" Lord Carpenter.

On June 30, 2008, Dorian schemes to break up David Vickers' marriage to her sister Addie Cramer by paying Delphina to predict misfortune should the couple stay together. Her plan backfires when Delphina instead predicts happiness in their future. Delphina also channels Mel, who again scolds Dorian for her recent deeds. Making her way around town, Delphina senses others' secrets and makes further cryptic predictions; one of which leads District Attorney Nora Hanen to evidence incriminating Lindsay Rappaport for the murder of Spencer Truman. His wedding to Lindsay aborted, a devastated Bo Buchanan leaves town, and Delphina gives Rex Balsom clues to find him. In Texas, Bo and Rex are struck by lightning and travel back to 1968. Seeking a way to return to the present, they find Professor Delbert Fina, a supposed expert on the subject and Delphina's psychic counterpart in 1968. While Delphina helps Gigi Morasco find Rex in 2008, Professor Fina aides Bo and Rex in 1968, and another bolt of lightning sends Bo home but pulls Gigi back to 1968. Later, Professor Fina watches as Rex and Gigi are transported back to 2008. Back in the present, Delphina tells Dorian's orphaned foster daughter Langston that she has a blood relative still alive somewhere.

In search of ex-husband David Vickers, Dorian summons Delphina on January 15, 2009, and the psychic reappears on January 23, 2009. She returns on July 27, 2009, to help Renee Buchanan communicate with her deceased husband Asa Buchanan, and Jessica Buchanan visits Delphina on August 19 and August 20, 2009, seeking information about her own dead husband Nash Brennan. Delphina visits Jessica at Llanfair on October 14, 2009. Delphina is revealed to be the ex-girlfriend of Dorian's new lesbian partner Amelia Bennett on December 16, 2009, and when the women reconcile, Dorian agrees to tear up the marriage certificate that she and Amelia had gotten as a stunt to help Dorian's campaign for mayor of Llanview. Madame Delphina returns in early 2011 to tell Natalie Buchanan where her son Liam might be, and drops hints on getting him back. She returns in August 2011 to help Rex with Gigi's "ghostly" problem.

== LeeAnn Demerest ==
LeeAnn Demerest
- One Life to Live character
- Portrayed by: Yasmine Bleeth
- Duration: 1991–93
- First appearance: April 3, 1991
- Last appearance: April 14, 1993
- Created by: Craig Carlson
- Introduced by: Paul Rauch
In-universe information
- Parents: DuAnn Demerest
- Spouse: Kevin Buchanan (1992)
- Children: Duke Buchanan
- First cousins: RuthAnn Demerest

LeeAnn Demerest is a fictional character on the American soap opera One Life to Live. The role was played by Yasmine Bleeth from 1991 to 1993. LeeAnn is the daughter of DuAnn Demerest.

LeeAnn Demerest comes to Llanview in 1991 on the heels of her mother DuAnn, the midwife who had helped birth Max Holden. Max is trying to uncover whether he is Asa Buchanan's biological son, and DuAnn seems inclined to help him make it look that way. LeeAnn becomes involved with Kevin Buchanan, who is on the rebound from a failed romance with Stephanie Hobart, but LeeAnn and Max are also drawn to one another. When LeeAnn believes that Max has fallen for Luna Moody, she sleeps with Kevin and becomes pregnant. Kevin finds out in 1992, and they elope. Meanwhile, blackmailing DuAnn is murdered, and Julia Medina confesses to the crime. Kevin and LeeAnn's marriage crumbles over her closeness with Jason Webb; they divorce in 1992. LeeAnn helps an illiterate Jason Webb learn to read and write; they fall in love and plan to get married on Valentine's Day 1993. After Jason is framed for possession of marijuana by Todd Manning, Zachary Rosen, and Powell Lord III, Kevin refuses LeeAnn any visitation with her son. Marty Saybrooke convinces Jason to pretend an affair, so that LeeAnn will break up with him. When she finds them together on Valentine's Day, she is destroyed, but Marty and Jason's plan is successful. Kevin gives LeeAnn custody of Duke now that Jason is out of the picture. Now that she is no longer with Jason and she is still heartbroken, LeeAnn leaves town for Texas with their son Duke Buchanan in 1993 to care for her ailing cousin, Ruth Ann.

== R.J. Gannon ==
R.J. Gannon
- One Life to Live character
- Portrayed by: Timothy D. Stickney
- Duration: 1994–2009
- First appearance: May 16, 1994
- Last appearance: April 28, 2009
- Created by: Michael Malone and Josh Griffith
- Introduced by: Linda Gottlieb
- Crossover appearances: All My Children
In-universe information
- Other names: Randall James Gannon; Jimmy Glover
- Occupation: Owner of Break Bar; Owner of Club Indigo
- Mother: Janine Gannon
- Siblings: Hank Gannon
- Daughters: Keri Reynolds
- Granddaughters: Jamie Vega
- Aunts: Clara
- Nieces: Rachel Gannon

Randall James "R.J." Gannon is a fictional character on the American soap opera One Life to Live. The role was played by Timothy D. Stickney.

R.J. is the younger brother of Hank Gannon. He first appears using the alias Jimmy Glover as the loan shark to whom Max Holden owes a considerable amount of money. He develops a close relationship with his niece, Rachel Gannon. It is revealed at one point that he had had a sexual relationship with Nora Hanen while she was married to Hank. He is the father of Keri Reynolds and has an adversarial relationship with Keri's boyfriend, Antonio Vega. After Keri's death, R.J. fights with Antonio for custody of his granddaughter, Jamie Vega.

== Jake Harrison ==
Jake Harrison
- One Life to Live character
- Portrayed by: Joe Lando
- Duration: 1990–92
- First appearance: March 6, 1990
- Last appearance: July 17, 1992
- Created by: S. Michael Schnessel
- Introduced by: Paul Rauch
In-universe information
- Occupation: Arms trader; Private investigator
- Parents: Baxter Harrison
- Half-sisters: Andy Harrison
- Spouse: Charlotte Hesser (1990); Megan Gordon (1991–92)

Jake Harrison is a fictional character on the American soap opera One Life to Live. The role was played by Joe Lando from 1990 until 1992.

Jake first appears in 1990 a fugitive and wanted to clear his name. Upon arriving in fictional Llanview, Michael Grande had the proof of Jake's whereabouts with plans to blackmail him into spying on Megan Gordon, the daughter of Victoria Lord Buchanan. Megan soon learned about the spying, but Jake convinced her that he was really a writer for a soap opera magazine. Soon after this, the two became friends. Michael Grande was soon found murdered, and Megan and Jake were the prime suspects. They were freed when it was revealed that Roger Gordon has murdered Michael is self-defense. Following this turmoil, the two became romantically involved.

Soon after this, Megan's sister Sarah was kidnapped by crime boss Carlo Hesser. Jake wanted information, and pretended to be interested in Carlo's daughter Charlotte. Carlo learned of the treachery and blackmailed Jake into marrying Charlotte. Jake was about to divorce her when she began faking blindness. He saw through her act and ended their marriage. Jake and Megan were soon married by Andrew Carpenter.

Jake soon took a job as an arms dealer and was sent around the world. On one trip, he was kidnapped by General Gaza in Jaba and was imprisoned. Andrew arrived in Jabe and saved Jake, but had grave news: Megan has become severely ill with Lupus. Jake rushed back to Llanview and sits at Megan's bed side. Megan soon dies and Jake is devastated, leaving town in the Summer of 1992.

== Mel Hayes ==
Mel Hayes
- One Life to Live character
- Portrayed by: Stephen Markle
- Duration: 1997–99; 2008; 2010
- First appearance: April 1997
- Last appearance: February 8, 2010
- Created by: Jean Passanante; Peggy Sloane
In-universe information
- Occupation: Pulitzer Prize-winning journalist
- Parents: Neil Hayes (deceased); Dr. Maude Boylan
- Spouse: Muriel Hayes; Dorian Lord (1998–99)
- Children: Roger Hayes; Frank Hayes; Dorothy Hayes

Melvin "Mel" Hayes is a fictional character on the American soap opera One Life to Live. Stephen Markle played the role from April 1997 until January 1999, with later guest appearances on July 21 and 22, 2008 and January 7, January 8, and February 8, 2010. Mel is the father of Dorothy Hayes, played by newcomer Elisabeth Röhm from 1997 until 1998.

Mel Hayes met Dorian Lord in Washington, D.C., while she was there on a business trip. A drunken Mel literally fell over Dorian when they met in a hotel bar. The sparks between them were instantaneous, and their feelings for one another continued to grow. Dorian convinced Mel to take a job as a reporter at The Banner. Looking for a fresh start, he moved to Llanview, and in a drunken stupor, bought a houseboat on Llantano River.

Mel's wife had died in a plane crash 18 months earlier, devastating him. His addiction to alcohol caused a large rift between him and his family, who tried unsuccessfully to intervene.

Mel forced Dorian to face her past in Canton, Ohio, after which Dorian broke up with him. Her near-death experience after being shot changed her mind and she proposed to Mel, who accepted. They were married in a quickly put together ceremony at The Banner. Their happiness ended less than a year later, though, when Mel was killed in a plane crash.

Mel appeared to Dorian as a ghost in July 2008 (One Life to Live's 40th Anniversary episodes) as Dorian grappled with whether or not to try to save Viki's life after a car crash. Subsequently, later that year and in 2009, a young woman named "Mel", whom Dorian came to believe was either "her" Mel in another form or someone sent by him, appeared in various guises whenever Dorian behaved less than ethically.

Mel reappeared to Dorian in January 2010, as the newly elected Mayor Lord gave in to Mitch Laurence's threats and fired Bo Buchanan as police commissioner. He also returned the following month to convince Dorian to stop Charlie Banks from going through with his plan to kill Mitch.

== Johnny Dee Hesser ==
Johnny Dee Hesser
- One Life to Live character
- Portrayed by: Anthony Crivello
- First appearance: June 14, 1990
- Last appearance: November 8, 1990
- Created by: Craig Carlson; Leah Laiman
- Introduced by: Paul Rauch
In-universe information
- Occupation: Mobster / Attorney
- Family: Bern/Hesser
- Parents: Carlo Hesser
- Stepparents: Alex Olanov (1992-1996)
- Siblings: Charlotte Hesser; Talia Sahid
- Grandparents: Stephan Bern; Wilma Bern
- Aunts and uncles: Mortimer Bern; Joseph Hobart
- First cousins: Stephanie Hobart

Johnny Dee Hesser is a fictional character on the American soap opera One Life to Live. The role was played by actor Anthony Crivello onscreen from June 1990 until the character's death November 8, 1990.

Upstate Pennsylvania mob boss Carlo arrives in Llanview, Pennsylvania in 1990 and sets up a drug-trafficking operation, but soon mayor and wealthy newspaper publisher Victoria Lord Buchanan steps in and shuts him down. Carlo's son and heir, Johnny Dee Hesser, seeks to aid his father and hires thugs to scare Viki off, but instead Viki ends up incapacitated by a stroke.

Meanwhile, Johnny has been romantically involved with Viki's half-sister Tina Lord, and soon a pregnant Tina is unsure whether the father of her baby is Johnny or her ex-husband Cord Roberts. Finding out about the baby and Tina's plans to reconcile with Cord, a distraught Johnny bursts into Llanfair, knocking Tina unconscious and attempting to kidnap her. Viki, unable to walk or speak, realizes that Tina's life is in danger; her long-dormant alternate personality Niki Smith emerges. As Niki, Viki is able to stand – and shoots Johnny to death. Initially, both Viki and Tina have no memory of what happened, and Tina becomes the prime suspect in the murder. However, an audio tape recorded in the room later exonerates her, and proves that Viki had acted in self-defense.[1][2]

The baby is proven to be Cord's; Carlo, however, vows revenge against the entire Buchanan family.

== Dallas Jones ==
Dallas Jones
- One Life to Live character
- Portrayed by: Loyita Chapel
- Duration: 1999; 2005; 2008
- First appearance: May 1999
- Last appearance: October 17, 2008
- Introduced by: Jill Farren Phelps (1999); Frank Valentini (2005, 2008)

Dallas Jones is a fictional character on the American soap opera One Life to Live. Loyita Chapel played the role in 1999, 2005, and from July 31 until October 17, 2008.

Having met and begun dating Clint Buchanan in London after he left Llanview in 1998, Dallas Jones accompanies him back to town in 1999 as his daughter Jessica Buchanan is about to deliver her first child and his father Asa Buchanan is set to remarry Renee Divine. In 2005, Clint returns to Llanview to help ex-wife Victoria Lord Davidson deal with Jessica's dissociative identity disorder, and Dallas follows to spend the holidays with Clint. Clint is furious when Dallas blames Viki for her relationship troubles with Clint, and he breaks it off with Dallas. Clint remains in Llanview, and Dallas returns to London. Dallas reappears again on July 31, 2008, as Clint is dating his former sister-in-law, Nora Hanen.

== Rebecca Lewis ==
Rebecca Lewis
- One Life to Live character
- Portrayed by: Reiko Aylesworth (1993–94); Jessica Kaye (2009)
- Duration: 1993–94; 2009
- First appearance: March 30, 1993
- Last appearance: May 20, 2009
- Created by: Michael Malone and Josh Griffith
- Introduced by: Linda Gottlieb; Frank Valentini (2009)
In-universe information
- Siblings: Kyle Lewis

Rebecca Lewis is a fictional character on the American soap opera One Life to Live. The role was portrayed by Reiko Aylesworth from 1993 to 1994, and Jessica Kaye from May 1–20, 2009.

Rebecca Lewis, follower of the Tabernacle of Joy ministry, meets and falls for Todd Manning while he is incarcerated for the rape of Marty Saybrooke. Though Todd begins to have feelings for her as well, he escapes to seek revenge on his enemies. A fugitive Todd and a captive Marty are surrounded in 1994; Rebecca talks her way inside in exchange for Marty. Todd escapes with Rebecca as a willing hostage, and she tries to persuade him to turn himself in. Surrounded again, Todd lets Rebecca go and flees; he is shot and presumed dead. Rebecca returns to Llanview and begins a romance with Powell Lord III. Meanwhile, Todd reappears alive and hides out in the gardener's shed at Llanfair, where Rebecca is an occasional babysitter, and Todd makes his presence known to her. Rebecca and Powell become engaged as a serial rapist begins terrorizing Llanview. Todd is suspected but it is ultimately revealed that Powell, threatened by Rebecca's attraction to Todd, had descended into madness and been raping women to emulate Todd and thereby win Rebecca's love. Powell is caught and institutionalized, and Rebecca leaves town.

In 2009, former Llanview police detective John McBain is investigating a serial murderer who leaves clues pointing to Marty's 1993 rape. A visit to Powell, not lucid and still in a sanitarium, seems fruitless until John stumbles upon Rebecca's name and learns that a "Dr. Marty Saybrooke" has been visiting and treating Powell. On May 1, 2009, it is revealed that Rebecca has been impersonating Marty and aiding Powell in a sinister plot against people connected with Todd and Marty. With her lab technician brother Kyle Lewis settled in Llanview, Rebecca helps Powell escape from the institution, imprisons John there, and helps Powell drug and abduct Todd, Marty, and Todd's ex-wives Blair Cramer and Téa Delgado with the intent of killing Todd and anyone he cares about. Powell confesses to the string of murders. John shoots Powell and saves Todd and Marty; as he pulls Blair and Téa from a gas-filled basement, Rebecca lights a match and is presumed dead in the subsequent explosion.

== Powell Lord III ==
Powell Lord III
- One Life to Live character
- Portrayed by: Sean Moynihan
- Duration: 1993–94; 2009
- First appearance: January 6, 1993
- Last appearance: May 20, 2009
- Created by: Michael Malone
- Introduced by: Linda Gottlieb (1993); Frank Valentini (2009)
In-universe information
- Occupation: Student at Llanview University
- Family: Lord
- Parents: Clayton-Powell Lord II; Patricia Baker Lord
- Grandparents: Clayton-Powell Lord I; Amy Lord
- Other relatives: Tony Lord; Victoria Lord; Meredith Lord; Tina Lord; Todd Manning; Victor Lord, Jr.; Richard Abbott; Kevin Buchanan

Clayton-Powell "Powell" Lord III is a fictional character on the American soap opera One Life to Live. He is the grandson of Victor Lord's brother Clayton-Powell, and is one of several Llanview University students who participated in the 1993 gang rape of Marty Saybrooke. Viki's son Kevin is also implicated but ultimately exonerated; the rape had been led by Todd Manning, and a guilty Powell had participated due to peer pressure. Powell receives a lesser sentence and later falls in love with Rebecca Lewis, who herself had seen a softer side in the imprisoned Todd and fell in love with him. A subsequent series of rapes is initially blamed on Todd, but it is revealed that Powell is the culprit, believing that he could win Rebecca's love if he became a rapist like Todd.

After being institutionalized after the rape of Marty Saybrooke, Powell bought the old fraternity house where Todd and Powell and friend Zach Rosen committed the crime that would haunt Powell. Clearly driven mad, he went to great lengths to put Kevin's room back together exactly as it was the night of the rape (right down to the fish in the tank and the posters on the walls). He and Rebecca Lewis arranged for Todd (in reality was Todd's twin Victor Lord Jr.), Tea Delgado, Blair Cramer, and Marty Saybrooke kidnapped, holding Victor "Todd" bound to the bed, threatening to kill him and Blair and Marty, as his way of atoning for his part in Marty's rape. Powell, clad in the same Frat sweater he wore the night of his crime against Marty, left Marty and "Todd" alone in the room and forced Blair and Tea to the basement at gunpoint and kept them captive in the utility room, which was leaking gas, poisoning the two women.

Rebecca later brought to Powell's attention that Chloe Brennan (Powell and Todd's mutual relative Jessica Buchanan's daughter) was in fact Todd's and Marty's granddaughter, Hope Thornhart. Powell tricked Victor into believing that he would let them go to raise Hope, but was ready to kill "Todd" at that moment. Victor goaded the cowardly cousin to do what he was threatening to do, only to be shot to death by John McBain. The basement exploded when Rebecca lit a match, but Tea, Blair, Marty, Victor, and Hope made it out alive with the help of John McBain, putting to rest the saga of insane Powell Lord III for good, along with the rape, leaving only a future with new grandchild/niece, Hope.

== Dylan Moody ==
Dylan Moody
- One Life to Live character
- Portrayed by: Christopher Douglas
- Duration: 1994–97; 2000
- First appearance: August 19, 1994
- Last appearance: 2000
- Created by: Josh Griffith; Michael Malone
- Introduced by: Susan Bedsow Horgan
- Book appearances: Patrick's Notebook
In-universe information
- Parents: Faye Moody
- Siblings: Luna Moody; Ty Moody; Charlemagne Moody; Bascombe Moody
- Spouse: Marty Saybrooke (1996)
- Nieces and nephews: Frankie Holden; Leslie Holden

Dylan Moody is a fictional character on the American soap opera One Life to Live. The role was played by actor Christopher Douglas from August 19, 1994, until January 16, 1997, and briefly in 2000.

Luna and Ty's younger brother Dylan arrives in fictional Llanview in 1994 when Luna is suffering from a spinal injury. He helps her during her convalescence, soon romancing Marty Saybrooke. He helps Marty get through her gang rape from 1993, and learn to love again. Dylan starts and runs a youth center in the Angel Square neighborhood of rough-and-tumble east Llanview. Tragically in 1995, Luna takes a bullet intended to kill Dylan. Dylan and Marty marry in 1996, but Dylan is paralyzed for a time after a back injury. Marty soon realizes her love to be greater for rugged Patrick Thornhart. Following their divorce, and without family in town, Dylan (now able to walk again) departs town in 1997.

== Luna Moody ==
Luna Moody Holden
- One Life to Live character
- Portrayed by: Susan Batten
- Duration: 1991–96; 2002–04; 2012
- First appearance: September 13, 1991
- Last appearance: January 9, 2012
- Created by: Michael Malone
- Introduced by: Linda Gottlieb
In-universe information
- Occupation: Host of Love Line; Owner of Serenity Springs; Waitress at Wanda's Place
- Parents: Faye Moody
- Siblings: Dylan Moody; Ty Moody; Charlemagne Moody; Bascombe Moody
- Husband: Bobby Ever (Backstory); Max Holden (1993–95)
- Children: Frankie Holden; Leslie Holden

Darlene "Luna" Moody is a fictional character on the American soap opera One Life to Live, played by actress Susan Batten. She debuted on-screen during the episode airing on September 13, 1991, as the first character to be introduced to the series by executive producer Linda Gottlieb and head writer Michael Malone. Batten departed the role on August 28, 1995, when the character was killed off. Batten would later make appearances in 1996, 2002, September 26, 2003, October 22, 2003, November 3 to 12, 2003; December 10, 2003, December 17 to 22, 2003, December 31, 2003, 2004, and 2012.

Luna is a funny, intelligent woman who is a Southern new-age Goddess worshiper. She believes in crystals, horoscopes and auras. She arrives in Llanview by parachute and falls in love with Max Holden. Max's eyes are set on Blair Cramer, so they decide to become business partners and open up a health spa called Serenity Springs. During that time, Max tells Luna that nothing romantic can happen between them. Luna starts her own radio show called "Love Line." In that time, she begins receiving poems and love letters from a guy named Suede Pruitt. Suede escapes from prison and makes his way to see Luna and ask for her help. He tells her he is innocent, so Luna consults the Goddess, who tells her he is telling the truth. Suede is accused of murdering his wife, Deborah, who looks like Luna. Suede tells Luna that Deborah's father, Marcus, is the killer. Max, Luna and Suede plan to set Marcus up to tell the truth. Max is shot and rushed to the hospital; Luna has to go into a trance to save him. After she saves him, he professes his love to her. They marry in December 1993 and she helps Max with gambling problems. Luna saves Al from death and gets struck by a car. She is paralyzed, but eventually regains the ability to walk. In May 1995, she has twins, Francis Thomas and Leslie Diana. Luna's brother is in danger with a gang called the Arrows, which leads to her getting shot in the stomach in the crossfire. She survives surgery, but later becomes feverish and dies in Max's arms.

Luna returns several times over the years as a spirit. She appears to Max after his son Al dies. Al's spirit begs Luna for a way to get back to Earth so that he can be with Marcie, the love of his life. She tried to help Al adjust to being dead, but then got the idea that he can return in another man's body so he can be with Marcie. This would be tricky as the rules stated that Al couldn't tell Marcie who he was really, and that he only had three months to get Marcie to fall for the new "Al". When Dr. Michael McBain collapsed from near-death allergy to a medicine he accidentally took, Marcie resuscitated him and Al's spirit replaced Michael's dead spirit. She then reappeared in 2012 with Gabrielle Medina and Megan Gordon to help guide the people they loved to the afterlife. She appears to Cole Thornhart after he is shot by Hannah O'Connor. She tells Cole he can either choose to enter heaven or return to life. Her words make Cole reconsider. When Robert Ford stumbles into Heaven pleading for help, an unprepared Luna can only save one of them and chooses Cole.

== Ty Moody ==
Ty Moody
- One Life to Live character
- Portrayed by: Casper Van Dien
- Duration: 1993–94
- First appearance: April 23, 1993
- Last appearance: 1994
- Created by: Josh Griffith; Michael Malone
- Introduced by: Linda Gottlieb
In-universe information
- Parents: Faye Moody
- Siblings: Dylan Moody; Luna Moody; Charlemagne Moody; Bascombe Moody
- Nieces and nephews: Frankie Holden; Leslie Holden

Tyrone "Ty" Moody is a fictional character on the American soap opera One Life to Live. The role was played by actor Casper Van Dien from 1993 until 1994.

Luna and Dylan's brother, Tyrone, comes to work help her build her start-up business Serenity Springs spa during the summer of 1993. Ty is introduced more traditional than Luna, and objects to her co-habitating with boyfriend Max Holden living without being married. Ty also discovers mischievous Alex Olanov plotting a takeover of the spa. Alex then leads Ty on, pretending to be interested in him, but he realizes Alex didn't care for him and left town.

== Ben Price ==
Ben Price
- One Life to Live character
- Portrayed by: Charles Malik Whitfield (1993-94); Peter Parros (1994-95)
- Duration: 1993–95
- First appearance: October 28, 1993
- Last appearance: October 24, 1995
- Created by: Josh Griffith; Michael Malone
- Introduced by: Linda Gottlieb
In-universe information
- Siblings: Sheila Price; Rika Price

Ben Price is a fictional character on the American soap opera One Life to Live. The role was played by actor Charles Malik Whitfield from October 28, 1993, until May 18, 1994, and by Peter Parros from June 13, 1994, until October 24, 1995.

Sheila's brother, Dr. Ben Price, arrives to town in 1993, and steals Rachel Gannon away from Kevin Buchanan. Ben saves Viki's life by determining the cause of the deadly flu virus that is sweeping through Llanview. Eventually, Rachel dumps him and he loses his job at the hospital. Ben briefly flirts with Marty Saybrooke, but nothing comes of it. He leaves town in 1995.

== Sheila Price ==
Sheila Price
- One Life to Live character
- Portrayed by: Valarie Pettiford (1990–94); Stephanie E. Williams (1994–96)
- Duration: 1990–96
- First appearance: September 21, 1990
- Last appearance: 1996
- Created by: Craig Carlson; Leah Laiman
- Introduced by: Paul Rauch
In-universe information
- Other names: Sheila Gannon
- Occupation: Physical therapist
- Siblings: Rika Price; Ben Price
- Spouse: Hank Gannon (1995–96)

Sheila Price (formerly Gannon) is a fictional character on the American soap opera One Life to Live. The role was originated by actress Valarie Pettiford from September 21, 1990, until March 2, 1994. Stephanie E. Williams last assumed the role from June 3, 1994, until 1996.

Sheila arrives in Llanview in 1990 as the rehabilitation therapist who assists Victoria Lord in recovering from a stroke. Sheila becomes the love interest of Llanview police chief Troy Nichols. Sheila's younger sister Rika Price was a scholarship student at Llanview University. Enormously overprotective of Rika, Sheila objects to Rika dating Troy's troublesome son, Kerry Nichols. This situation causes much tension between Sheila and Troy. Rika and Kerry leave town in 1991; Troy remain until 1993.

After suffering a miscarriage, Sheila divorces Hank Gannon and leaves Llanview in 1996.

== Sam Rappaport ==
Sam Rappaport
- One Life to Live character
- Portrayed by: Kale Browne (1998–2001); Laurence Lau (2001–03)
- Duration: 1998–2003
- First appearance: March 5, 1998
- Last appearance: April 9, 2003
- Created by: Claire Labine and Matthew Labine
- Introduced by: Jill Farren Phelps
In-universe information
- Other names: Sam Davidson
- Occupation: Lawyer
- Parents: Sam Davidson; Jane Rappaport
- Siblings: Grace Davidson; Ben Davidson (adoptive)
- Spouse: Lindsay Rappaport (pre-1998)
- Children: Will Rappaport; Jennifer Rappaport

Sam Rappaport is a fictional character from the ABC soap opera, One Life to Live. The role was originated by actor Kale Browne from March 5, 1998, through April 11, 2001. The role was assumed on May 8, 2001, by Laurence Lau, who had previously portrayed Greg Nelson on All My Children. Lau left the role on April 9, 2003.

Attorney Sam Rappaport arrives in Llanview to defend his old friend, Todd Manning, on rape charges. He is surprised to run into his former flame, Nora Buchanan, and he realizes that he never truly gave up on her. Sam then helps Todd during his divorce from his wife, Téa Delgado. He also helps Nora and Bo Buchanan by defending Bo when he is accused of murdering Georgie Philips. Sam soon enters into a turbulent relationship with Blair Cramer Manning. His ex-wife, Lindsay, arrives in town and begs Sam to care for their son, Will. Sam agrees and Blair leaves town with Max Holden. She soon returns around the time that Will arrives and tries to get on Sam's good side. Sam also defends Todd on his kidnapping charges but is later shocked and angry to learn that he had been faking his multiple personalities the whole time and Blair had knowledge of Todd's farce.

After the death of Bo's son, Drew Buchanan, Bo enters into a depression, and Nora is desperate to give him a reason to live. She lies about being pregnant with Bo's baby, but believes that Bo is sterile, so she turns to Sam. Lindsay knows the truth of Nora's plan and publicly announces the affair, causing the breakup of Bo and Nora. Nora continues to confide in Sam and the two grew close. During a snowstorm, Nora goes into labor and Sam rushes her to the hospital. In February, 1999, she gives birth to a son, Matthew. Sam and Nora continue to grow closer, and after her divorce with Bo is finalized, Sam and Nora attempt to marry multiple times, but each time with their plans are thwarted. They both resign to living together unmarried.

Nora is presumed killed in a train crash, devastating Sam. He refuses to believe that she is dead and continues to search for her. She was, however, being held captive by Colin MacIver, but is eventually rescued by Todd. Nora returns to Llanview and loses most of her memory, not remembering Matthew or her relationship with Sam. Sam gives her space, hoping she would remember.

Tragedy soon strikes the Rappaports when Lindsay, brainwashed by Mitch Laurence, accidentally shoots and kills Sam. His family and friends are devastated. A document delivered after his death confirms that Bo was actually Matthew's biological father, and that Sam kept this information from everybody because he had loved Matthew as his own son.

== Will Rappaport ==
Will Rappaport
- One Life to Live character
- Portrayed by: Jason-Shane Scott
- Duration: 1998–2001; 2003; 2005; 2007
- First appearance: July 22, 1998
- Last appearance: October 1, 2007
- Created by: Pam Long
- Introduced by: Jill Farren Phelps; Frank Valentini (2003)
In-universe information
- Other names: William Samuel Rappaport (Full Name)
- Occupation: Lawyer; Owner of B&B United
- Parents: Sam Rappaport; Lindsay Rappaport
- Sisters: Jennifer Rappaport
- Daughters: Megan Rappaport
- Grandparents: Sam Davidson; Jane Rappaport
- Aunts and uncles: Ben Davidson (adoptive); Grace Davidson; Melanie MacIver

William "Will" Rappaport is a fictional character on the American soap opera One Life to Live. The character was portrayed by Jason-Shane Scott from 1998 until 2001, with guest appearances in 2003, 2005 and 2007.

Will Rappaport, the son of Sam and Lindsay Rappaport, arrives in Llanview in July 1998 and befriends Jessica Buchanan, who later becomes pregnant with his child. When Dorian Lord accidentally runs down Jessica with her car, Jessica survives but loses her unborn child, named Megan. When Jessica sets up a foundation in Megan's honor, Will embezzles money from the fund, ultimately revealed to Llanview residents and forcing him to leave town in shame.

Will leaves Llanview in August 2001, but returns briefly in 2003 and 2005 when his father Sam dies and Bo Buchanan is revealed to be Matthew Buchanan's father, and when his sister Jennifer is murdered. Lindsay is arrested for the murder of Spencer Truman in the fall of 2007, and Will once again returns to visit her in jail and offer his legal representation and support.

== Cain Rogan ==
Cain Rogan
- One Life to Live character
- Portrayed by: Christopher Cousins
- Duration: 1991–94; 2008
- First appearance: July 9, 1991
- Last appearance: November 12, 2008
- Created by: Craig Carlson; Leah Laiman
- Introduced by: Paul Rauch (1991); Frank Valentini (2008)
In-universe information
- Occupation: Con man; Former Assistant to Asa Buchanan
- Spouse: Angela Holliday (until 1991); Tina Lord (1993)

Cain Rogan is a fictional character on the American soap opera One Life to Live. Actor Christopher Cousins appeared in the role onscreen from July 1991 through 1994, reappearing in July 2008.

== Patrick Thornhart ==
Patrick Thornhart
- One Life to Live character
- Portrayed by: Thorsten Kaye
- Duration: 1995–97
- First appearance: October 16, 1995
- Last appearance: September 16, 1997
- Created by: Michael Malone
- Introduced by: Susan Bedsow Horgan
- Book appearances: Patrick's Notebook
In-universe information
- Siblings: Ian Thornhart; Granya Thornhart
- Spouse: Marty Saybrooke (1997–)
- Sons: Brendan Thornhart; (stillborn); Cole Thornhart
- Granddaughters: Hope Manning-Thornhart
- Nieces and nephews: Daniel Thornhart

Patrick Thornhart is a fictional character on the American soap opera One Life to Live. Actor Thorsten Kaye appeared in the role from October 16, 1995, to September 16, 1997.

Patrick meets Marty Saybrooke while in Ireland trying to dodge a terrorist group known as the "Men of 21". Todd Manning shows up to help Marty return home; Todd is mistaken for Patrick, shot by the group and presumed dead. Patrick poses as Todd in order to return to Llanview with Marty.

Patrick briefly becomes romantically involved with Todd's apparent widow Blair Cramer Manning; a very-much-alive Todd returns and witnesses their lovemaking. Blair gives birth to Patrick's stillborn child, named Brendan Thornhart. Patrick marries Marty in 1997 and the two leave for Ireland.

Marty returns to Llanview in 2006 with Cole, her son with Patrick. She reveals that Patrick apparently died Christmas 2005 in San Diego in a car explosion.

In 2011, Patrick Thornhart is revealed to be alive as Marty leaves Llanview on June 3.

== Antonio Vega ==
Antonio Vega
- One Life to Live character
- Portrayed by: Kamar de los Reyes (1995–98, 2000–09); Robert Montano (2007, temporary)
- Duration: 1995–98, 2000–09
- First appearance: July 10, 1995
- Last appearance: April 22, 2009
- Created by: Michael Malone
- Introduced by: Susan Bedsow Horgan
In-universe information
- Occupation: Police Officer & Detective, Llanview Police Department; Owner, Capricorn
- Parents: Isabella Santi; Manuel Santi
- Adoptive parents: Carlotta Vega; Diego Vega
- Siblings: Adriana Cramer; Tico Santi; Cristian Vega (adoptive)
- Spouse: Andy Harrison (1997–2000); Jessica Buchanan (2006–07)
- Children: Jamie Vega
- Aunts: Carlotta Vega
- First cousins: Cristian Vega

Antonio Vega (born Santi) is a fictional character on the American soap opera One Life to Live. He was portrayed by Kamar de los Reyes from 1995 through 1998, and then from 2000 through 2009. He was raised as the son of Carlotta Vega and brother of Cristian Vega, although it was revealed in 2004 that he was actually the son of Manuel Santi, Carlotta's brother. When Antonio first appears, he is serving a prison sentence for murder, which is later determined to have been in self-defense. Upon his release from Statesville Prison, he joins the Llanview Police Department.

He begins a relationship with Keri Reynolds, the daughter of his frequent nemesis, R.J. Gannon. Antonio and Keri have daughter, Jamie Vega. After Keri's death, Antonio fights R.J. for custody of Jamie. Antonio also begins a new relationship with Jessica Buchanan which lasts for several years.

== Carlotta Vega ==
Carlotta Vega
- One Life to Live character
- Portrayed by: Unknown actress (1993–1994); Patricia Mauceri (1995–2009); Saundra Santiago (2009–11)
- Duration: 1994–2011
- First appearance: May 17, 1994
- Last appearance: September 8, 2011
- Created by: Michael Malone and Josh Griffith
- Introduced by: Susan Bedsow Horgan
In-universe information
- Occupation: Owner, Buenos Dias Café; Former maid of Dorian Lord
- Siblings: Manuel Espinoza Santi
- Husband: Diego Vega (backstory)
- Sons: Cristian Vega
- Adoptive sons: Antonio Vega
- Granddaughters: Jamie Vega (legal)
- Nieces and nephews: Antonio Vega; Adriana Cramer; Tico Santi; Sonia Toledo (adoptive)

Carlotta Vega (née Espinoza) is a fictional character on the American soap opera One Life to Live. Patricia Mauceri originated the role from March 1995 until March 25, 2009. Saundra Santiago took over the role from September 3, 2009 until September 8, 2011.

Carlotta is introduced in 1994 as the longtime maid and loyal confidante of Dorian Lord. Carlotta's teenage son Cristian soon becomes romantically involved with heiress Jessica Buchanan. At first, both Carlotta and Jessica's parents disapprove of the match. Carlotta's elder son Antonio, a former gang member in Llanview's Angel Square, is released from prison the same year after serving a seven-year sentence for murder. Carlotta eventually quits Dorian's employ to run her own diner. Carlotta is romantically linked at times to both Clint Buchanan and Hank Gannon.

Carlotta suffers through the disappearance and presumed death of Cristian in 2003; Antonio is also accused of killing Keri Reynolds, the mother of his child, but is later exonerated. Also in 2003, Carlotta's 15-year-old goddaughter Adriana Colón arrives in Llanview; by 2004 it is revealed that Adriana is actually the secret daughter of Carlotta's brother, crime lord Manuel Santi, and Dorian Lord.

A Cristian lookalike with no memory of his past appears in Llanview in 2004, secretly programmed by Manuel's son Tico Santi to kill Antonio — who is secretly Manuel's eldest son and heir. Carlotta is forced to admit that Antonio is actually Manuel's son with Isabella/Angelina; the attempt to murder Antonio fails as the trauma of trying to kill his own brother brings Cristian's memories flooding back. After killing Tico and being sent to prison in 2005, Cristian keeps his true identity hidden from his family. Later in 2005, Cristian's sentence is overturned; he is released from jail and reveals himself to his overjoyed mother.

== Others ==
Character	Date(s)	Actor	Storylines
Grace Atherton	1994	Susan Gibney	Grace Atherton is the administrator of Llanview Hospital who clashes with Dr. Ben Price during a flu outbreak.
Charlie Briggs	1995–1998, 2000	Robert J. Hogan	Charlie Briggs was often mentioned as an employee of The Banner for many years prior to being seen onscreen.
John Carpenter	January 1996 – April 1997	Michael Swan	Bishop John Carpenter is the father of Maggie Carpenter.
Lou Cramer	1997 – 1998	Peter Galman	
Barbara Graham	1998 – 1999	Sonia Satra	Barbara was a nurse and the daughter of Congressman Richard Graham. In September 1998, she shoots and kills Drew Buchanan and wounds Cassie Callison.
Angela Holliday	March 29, 1993 – 1994	Susan Diol	Angela Holliday is an evangelical preacher who operates the Tabernacle of Joy. Cord Roberts seeks solace in the Tabernacle due to trauma he endured in the Middle East before Angela is exposed as a fraud. Rebecca Lewis is one of her devout followers.
Sonya Roskova Cramer	1997 – February 13, 1998	Marian Seldes	Long presumed dead, she was the mother of Dorian Lord.
Jason Webb	August 6, 1991 – August 5, 1994	Mark Brettschneider	Jason Webb is the nephew of Wanda Webb Wolek, who dated Dorian Lord, and almost married LeeAnn Demerest after she helped him with his illiteracy. He was best friends with Marty Saybrooke.
Suede Pruitt	1992–1994	David Ledingham	Suede Pruitt arrived in Llanview after escaping prison for to prove his innocence from the crime of murdering his wife, Deborah, who looked like Luna Moody. He is an old boyfriend of Marty Saybrooke. Todd Manning murdered him in 1994.

== See also ==
- List of One Life to Live characters
