= Feeding Frenzy =

Feeding Frenzy may refer to:

== Basic meanings ==
- Feeding frenzy, rapid feeding by predatory animals
  - Media feeding frenzy, intense journalistic attention

== Films, TV, and Video Games ==
- Feeding Frenzy (2010 film), a genre-spoof movie by RedLetterMedia
- Feeding Frenzy: Jimmy Buffett Live!, 1990
- Feeding Frenzy (TV series), a reality show
- "Feeding Frenzy" (Magic City), a 2012 episode of the American television show Magic City
- Feeding Frenzy (video game), a video game by PopCap Games

== Books ==
- Feeding Frenzy, a book by Larry Sabato
- Feeding Frenzy, a novel in the Undercover Brothers series

== Music ==
=== Albums ===
- Feeding Frenzy (album), an album by Darediablo

=== Songs ===
- "Feeding Frenzy", a song by Midnight Oil from their album Earth and Sun and Moon
- "Feeding Frenzy", a song from Tara Hugo Sings Philip Glass
