= Adriana Cramer =

Fictional character portrayed by Melissa Fumero

- One Life to Live character
- Melissa Fumero as Adriana Cramer
- Portrayed by: Amanda Cortinas (2003); Melissa Fumero (2004–2011)
- Duration: 2003–2008, 2010–2011
- First appearance: May 27, 2003
- Last appearance: January 25, 2011
- Created by: Michael Malone and Josh Griffith
- Introduced by: Frank Valentini
- Crossover appearances: All My Children
In-universe information
- Other names: Adriana Colón; Adriana Santi
- Occupation: Co-owner of Exposed; Model for Craze
- Family: Cramer
- Father: Manuel Santi
- Mother: Dorian Cramer Lord
- Adoptive father: Cesar Colón
- Adoptive mother: Ramona Colón
- Half-brothers: Antonio Vega; Tico Santi
- Half-sisters: Cassie Callison; Langston Wilde (adoptive)
- Husband: Rex Balsom (2008)
- Grandfathers: Lou Cramer
- Grandmothers: Sonya Cramer
- Aunts: Carlotta Vega; Melinda Cramer; Addie Cramer
- Nephews: William Carpenter; River Carpenter (adoptive)
- Nieces: Jamie Vega
- First cousins: Cristian Vega; Blair Cramer; Kelly Cramer; Paul Cramer

Adriana Cramer is a fictional character from the American daytime drama One Life to Live. Amanda Cortinas originated the character in 2003, and Melissa Fumero (credited by her maiden name "Melissa Gallo") subsequently played her from 2004 to 2008, 2010, and 2011.

== Casting ==
The role was originated by Amanda Cortinas from May 27 to September 30, 2003. The role was recast with Melissa Fumero, debuting January 20, 2004 and continuing through June 11, 2008. Fumero returned for a stint from September 18, 2008, to October 28, 2008, and again on February 12, 2010, to help usher in the return of Kelly Cramer (Gina Tognoni). Fumero returned again on November 9, 2010, for two episodes and once more on January 25, 2011. Fumero also portrayed the role on All My Children for two episodes in February 2005.

== Storylines ==
In May 2003, 15-year-old Adriana Colón arrives in Llanview to stay with her godmother, Carlotta Vega for the summer. Upon arriving, she meets and quickly falls in love with River Carpenter. Disapproving of the relationship, Carlotta does everything she can to separate the lovers, culminating in having Adriana whisked to a convent school in Puerto Rico in September 2003. Upon tracking her down, River brings her back to Llanview in January 2004.

Upon Adriana's re-arrival in Llanview, Dorian Cramer Lord announces that she is her biological mother and that Adriana is to inherit $30 million from Dorian's Aunt Betsy. Although Dorian's revelation of being Adriana's mother originates as a scheme cooked up by Dorian and David Vickers to secure Betsy's money for themselves, it is later proven to be true.

While serving as the Ambassador to Mendorra in the mid-1980s, Dorian was introduced to mobster Manuel Santi, brother of her longtime maid, Carlotta Vega. The two briefly married, but, six weeks later, a now pregnant Dorian had the marriage annulled. Upon giving birth to Adriana, fearing for the child's safety in light of Santi's reputation and lifestyle, Dorian placed her in the custody of the Colón family in Puerto Rico.

In summer 2004, Manuel Santi's volatile son Tico Santi comes to Llanview, forging a sibling relationship with Adriana. In the meantime, it is revealed that Antonio Vega is Santi's biological son and half-brother to Adriana.

Adriana and River's relationship, meanwhile, takes a serious turn and the two teenagers have sex. They fail to use protection and Adriana fears that she could be pregnant. To her relief, she is not. Later, Adriana is kidnapped by members of Tico's organization. Her sudden disappearance causes River to think that she no longer wants to be with him, and he gives in to the temptations of Shannon McBain. Upon Adriana's return to Llanview, she catches the two together and ends her and River's relationship. A heartbroken River leaves Llanview.

In early 2005, Adriana begins dating Duke Buchanan, though their families are rivals and object to their involvement. That summer, Adriana follows Duke to Argentina, where Duke's great-grandfather Asa Buchanan is in hiding. While there, the two are chased by Argentine thugs after overhearing a conversation between Asa and Carlo Hesser about eliminating one of the Cramer women and assuming that they were speaking of Adriana. Duke and Adriana are captured by Carlo's henchmen and held for ransom. The two young lovers escape and return to Llanview. Adriana is bothered when Duke spends more time at his job at Buchanan Enterprises. During this time, Adriana befriends Rex Balsom and they develop an attraction. Though Adriana resists it because of her relationship with Duke, it leads to a kiss. When Duke learns of Adriana's indiscretion, he is angered but willing to work things out. When Adriana and Duke are about to have sex for the first time, she calls Duke by Rex's name. Duke ends their relationship. The two slowly make inroads and, tentatively, begin seeing each other again. Adriana's attraction to Rex remains a palpable presence in their relationship. Realizing her feelings for Rex are not going away, Adriana breaks off her relationship with Duke.

Adriana and Rex's new relationship is tested when she learns that he has aided and abetted a fugitive Todd Manning. In the spring of 2006, Adriana begins modeling and quickly forges a successful career, resulting in her being stalked by an obsessed fan. Adriana is attacked several times, and Rex seeks to protect her. Fearing for her safety, Adriana and Rex leave Llanview. The stalker becomes aware of their whereabouts and follows them. As Rex investigates who is behind the ordeal, Adriana mistakenly believes that he is the culprit and flees from him. The actual stalker is shady attorney Bruce Bartlett. During this time, Adriana is startled to learn that he had been hired by Dorian to tail her while the two plot to make Rex look like the guilty party in Dorian's attempt to break up their relationship. Bruce turns on Dorian and demands ransom for Adriana's safe return.

Meanwhile, Rex continues to investigate and eventually intervenes. During a fight, Rex kills Bruce. While Adriana and Rex reunite, Adriana is livid with Dorian and exiles her mother from her life. Adriana later moves in with Layla Williamson, and the two join forces to go into the lingerie business. The two soon hire Tate Harmon as a model, and he and Adriana became friends. Rex does not trust Tate, which leads to his and Adriana's break-up. Tate is later verified as a member of One Pure People, a racist group. Adriana still loves Rex and they soon get back together.

Adriana later goes to Paris after a man named Jean-Pierre expresses interest in her work. It is later discovered that Adriana's trip is a set-up by Dorian to keep her and Rex apart. Adriana gives Dorian an ultimatum: if she does not marry Rex, she will cut Dorian out of her life. However, Adriana's attitude is seemingly based on jealousy towards Rex's ex-girlfriend, Gigi Morasco, rather than resentment towards Dorian. Adriana takes on a darker attitude due to insecurity about Gigi and Rex.

Rex and Adriana marry on May 20, 2008. The wedding has a few ups and downs, including Gigi standing up and declaring her feelings for Rex, as well as the return of Brody Lovett, who was believed by everyone to be dead. Adriana had brought Brody to Llanview in the hopes that Brody and Gigi would resume their previous relationship. Adriana lashes out at Dorian after finding Dorian is responsible for Gigi's declaration of love and trying to get Brody to leave Llanview. Adriana blames Dorian for her problems with Rex while hating that she has become a manipulative schemer like her mother. She tells Rex the truth about all of her lies, with the exception of Rex being Shane's father, and leaves town for Paris to sort things out. On September 18, 2008, Rex tells Adriana that he wants a divorce after realizing that she had known about Shane's paternity all along and had even provided Brody with the means to fake the DNA test.

Adriana returns on October 2, 2008, after Rex is shot by Brody. At first, she does not allow Gigi to see Rex, and moves him into La Boulaie. After realizing that she has no chance with Rex, she allows him to be with Gigi, and returns to Paris. In December 2009, it is mentioned that Adriana had been in a car accident; she survives, but Dorian attributes it to Mitch Laurence, who has been threatening to harm one of the Cramer women.

On February 12, 2010, Adriana runs into her cousin Kelly Cramer at a Paris cafe. With Mitch's threat looming, the two return to Llanview and reunite with Dorian and Blair. On March 2, 2010, Adriana surprises Rex at his loft and they briefly reconnect; however, Rex is still in love with Gigi.

On November 9, 2010, Adriana makes another appearance in Paris along with Cristian, Layla, and Gigi. Adriana invites Gigi for a drink and begins to taunt her about her and Rex becoming close friends since the incident with her sister Stacy Morasco, which results in Gigi punching her. Adriana simply shrugs it off. Before leaving the exhibit with Layla, she tells Gigi to tell Rex she said hello, then takes it back, saying she will call Rex and tell him herself.

Adriana reappears on January 25, 2011, when Dorian calls her to get information on Aubrey Wentworth.
