= Todd Manning =

Fictional character from One Life to Live

- One Life to Live character
- Roger Howarth as Todd Manning
- Portrayed by: Roger Howarth (1993–2003, 2011–2013); Trevor St. John (2003–2011)
- Duration: 1993–1998; 2000–2013
- First appearance: January 6, 1993
- Last appearance: August 5, 2013
- Created by: Michael Malone and Josh Griffith
- Introduced by: Linda Gottlieb (1993); Susan Bedsow Horgan (1996); Jill Farren Phelps (2000); Frank Valentini (2011–2012); Jennifer Pepperman (2013)
- Book appearances: Patrick's Notebook
- Crossover appearances: General Hospital
- Trevor St. John as Todd Manning
In-universe information
- Other names: Ted Lampley; Todd Lord
- Occupation: Media proprietor; Businessman; Editor-in-chief
- Family: Lord
- Father: Victor Lord
- Mother: Irene Manning
- Adoptive parents: Peter Manning; Barbara Jones
- Brothers: Victor Lord, Jr.
- Sisters: Tina Lord
- Half-brothers: Tony Lord
- Half-sisters: Victoria Lord; Meredith Lord
- Spouse: Blair Cramer (1995–1997, 2001–2002, 2013–present) (Note: The first ceremony for Todd and Blair was in February 1995. The marriage was annulled months later in August. The second marriage between them took place in November of the same year until their divorce in 1997. However, they were married consecutively from 1995–1997.); Téa Delgado (1997–1999) (Note: The first ceremony for Todd and Téa was on July 15, 1997. The marriage was annulled in 1998. The second marriage between them took place the same year until their divorce in 1999. However, they were married consecutively from 1997–99.)
- Sons: Jack Manning
- Daughters: Starr Manning; Danielle Manning
- Grandchildren: Hope Manning-Thornhart
- Grandparents: Albert Manning
- Aunts and uncles: Clayton-Powell Lord; Gwendolyn Lord Abbott
- Nieces and nephews: Megan Gordon; Brian Kendall; Daniel Wolek; Kevin Buchanan; Joey Buchanan; Jessica Buchanan; Natalie Buchanan; C. J. Roberts; Sarah Roberts; Sam Manning; Victor Lord III
- First cousins: Clayton-Powell Lord II; Richard Abbott
- Other relatives: Peter Manning; Martha Manning; Powell Lord III; Duke Buchanan; Kevin Buchanan Jr.; Megan Buchanan; Bree Brennan; Chloe Brennan; Ryder Ford; Liam McBain; Zane Buchanan

Thomas Todd Manning is a fictional character from the American daytime dramas One Life to Live (OLTL) and General Hospital (GH). Created by writers Michael Malone and Josh Griffith, the role was originated in 1993 by actor Roger Howarth. Todd was a college student and fraternity brother to Kevin Buchanan, Zach Rosen, and Powell Lord. In 1993, following a storyline in which he becomes acquainted with Marty Saybrooke, he initiates a gang rape on her with the help of Zach and Powell. The storyline was considered groundbreaking by television critics. Its main players—Howarth, Susan Haskell (Marty), and Hillary B. Smith (Todd's lawyer Nora Hanen)—won Emmys in 1994, as did Malone and his writing team. Howarth left the role in 2003; it was recast with Trevor St. John, physically altered by plastic surgery. In 2011, Howarth returned to OLTL; it was disclosed Todd had been taken hostage and St. John's version of the character was really Todd's identical twin brother, Victor Lord, Jr., conditioned to assume Todd's place.

Todd was initially a short-term villain, but his popularity with the audience and critics inspired the writers to forgo killing him or permanently sending him to prison, like most soap operas had done with rapists in the past. While keeping aspects of his personality dark or violent, they had Todd exhibit a conscience and compassion. They took steps to redeem him and made him an integral part of OLTL's canvas, despite Howarth's objections to a redemption storyline. With the use of literary techniques for the redemptive arc, the writers borrowed from nineteenth-century melodrama and Gothic traditions, and literature such as Frankenstein. Todd became the product of an affair between his father, Victor Lord, and his mother, Irene Manning, which provided him a fortune and ties to other major characters, including his sisters, Tina and Victoria Lord. An important aspect of the character became his appearance, most notably the scar on his right cheek, which emerged as synonymous with him and served to remind him of his past misdeeds against Marty. Music and the use of humor were also key to Todd's development. Although he formed many relationships (including with his wives, Blair Cramer and Téa Delgado), and fathered children, a defining characteristic of his personality was his resistance to close relationships and sexual intimacy.

The drive to redeem Todd eventually drew Howarth, who always saw Todd as a villain, to leave the show for a year; he was uncomfortable with the redemption storyline and with many fans' positive reactions to Todd. Recasting Todd years later with St. John was generally considered successful by viewers and critics. St. John, instead of imitating Howarth's portrayal, brought his own spin to the character. After OLTL's cancellation in 2012, Howarth brought Todd to General Hospital (GH), but returned, along with St. John as Victor Jr., to the online version of OLTL in 2013, which was canceled after one year.

Todd has been the subject of numerous soap opera articles, feminist studies, and inspired the creation of a doll in his likeness. He has remained a popular and controversial figure since his creation, and is considered one of soap opera's breakout characters.

== Storylines ==
Todd was a college student and fraternity brother to Kevin Buchanan, Zach Rosen, and Powell Lord. In 1993, following a storyline in which he becomes acquainted with Marty Saybrooke (Susan Haskell), Todd initiates a gang rape of her with the help of Zach and Powell. At first, his lawyer, Nora Hanen (Hillary B. Smith), is sure of his innocence, but comes to realize that Todd is guilty and tricks him into confessing. He is sentenced to prison, but he manages to escape, and he is eventually paroled. It is discovered that Todd is the son of Victor Lord, and that he is the lost Lord heir, making him a wealthy man.

Todd has several romantic pairings and marriages throughout the years, including with Rebecca Lewis (Reiko Aylesworth), Blair Cramer (Kassie DePaiva), Téa Delgado (Florencia Lozano), and Carly Corinthos (Laura Wright). He has two children, Starr (Kristen Alderson) and Jack, and strengthens ties with his family, especially with his sister, Victoria "Viki" Lord (Erika Slezak).

Howarth left the role from time to time, the longest beginning in 2003; it was recast with Trevor St. John, physically altered by plastic surgery. In 2011, Howarth returned to OLTL, when it was disclosed that Todd had been taken hostage, and St. John's version of the character was actually Todd's identical twin brother, Victor Lord, Jr., who had been conditioned to assume Todd's place.

== Creation and development ==
=== Background ===
Todd was originally intended to be a short-lived role, but Howarth's portrayal of the character inspired notable fan reaction, which prompted the creators to layer Todd's personality and showcase him regularly within the series. Michael Malone, Todd's creator, said fleshing out the character reminded him of what he loved about soap operas, adding, "The story-telling is a genuine collaboration, not just among writers but by the actors". Malone felt he could not take full credit for the development of Todd from Marty Saybrooke's gang rapist to what he later became, and also noted Howarth's impact:

In the creation of Todd Manning, no one played a larger role than the remarkably talented Josh Griffith, first associate head writer, then co-head writer, during my stay at One Life. Josh loved, lived and breathed Todd and fought passionately for his position on the show. Second, Todd never would have evolved from "first frat boy" to the major cast member he became without the powerful talent of Roger Howarth. Because of Roger's ability to convey the complexity of Todd (the hurt as well as anger, the insecurity as well as bluster, the brains, yearning, manipulativeness, sexiness, tenderness, nastiness) we were able to explore both the deeply dark side of this character (the effort to destroy Marty to cover the rape, the attempted revenge on his lawyer Nora, the attack on Luna) and at the same time slowly uncover his growing struggle (usually a failed struggle) towards some kind of redemption. Romantic leads have often begun their careers playing villains (Valentino, Clark Gable, Humphrey Bogart among them). These characters appeal because they make women feel both the thrill of the "bad" and the lure of the hidden "good": they can lead the man to change through love. "I'll save him!" Fans loved Todd from the beginning because he always had that appeal.

Malone originally scripted Todd as a serial rapist. As part of the 1993 rape storyline, it was disclosed that Todd raped a woman named Carol Swift a year or two before raping Marty, and that there were hints he raped other young women before Carol. Howarth considered Todd's rationale for raping Marty to be complex. "Todd was in love with Marty," he said. When Marty rejects Todd's romantic advances after their one-night stand, it is because he was cold to her that same night after they had sex. Marty's rejection upsets Todd, and it festers. When he fails an exam after she tutors him, he blames her for the failure and blames her as the reason for his problems. Howarth called Todd "privileged and very rich". Because Todd was used to getting what he wanted, he did not know how to cope with Marty rejecting him.

Although Todd is the product of an affair between Victor Lord and Irene Manning, Malone gave him the last name "Manning" without knowing the name of Victor's mistress, an oversight that allowed the writers to later reveal him as Tina and Victoria Lord's brother. He is at first presented as 18 years old, but over the years, his age has been changed based on the occasional rapid aging of his children. Malone stated that making Todd heir to the Lord fortune gave the writers "huge story" that helped Howarth's character evolve from a short-term role to a major cast member, which Malone attributed to Howarth's "powerful talent". Peter Manning, who Todd thought was his father, had died; Todd receives letters written by his adoptive mother disclosing that he is the Lord heir, and worth almost $30 million. Developing Todd not only as Victoria's unwanted sibling, whom she was horrified to discover was her blood, but as "her professional rival" who used "a splashy tabloid newspaper to wipe out her venerable" newspaper, The Banner, appealed to Malone.

Executive producer Susan Bedsow Horgan, when speaking of Todd's psychological motivations, reported that Peter Manning degraded him verbally and abused his adoptive mother, whom Todd loved but who abandoned and disappointed him, leaving Todd with wounds that influenced his later behavior. Author Gerry Waggett stated that Peter Manning had physically abused Todd his entire life.

=== Signature scar, hair and facial cues ===
A young Howarth with Todd's vintage, long-haired look (left). A makeup artist applying Todd's scar to Howarth (right); the scar stretches in a curve across the character's right cheek, and appears a thin, medium red in its significantly healed version.

In late 1993, in order to make Todd look more menacing, he was given a scar to his right cheek by Marty's friend, Luna Moody, when she hit him in his face with a crowbar while preventing his attempt to rape Marty for a second time. The camera would often close in on and emphasize Todd's scar, which later became synonymous with the character.

To casting director Howard Meltzer, "Todd wears the scar like a badge. It's a warning to others: Don't mess with me". Meltzer felt Howarth underplayed Todd; Todd did not have to rant to incite fear. Meltzer added: "He gets a lot more from the raising of an eyebrow than raising the volume of his voice. Most of Todd's performance is reacting to the environment around him, and thanks to Howarth's expressiveness, viewers can see the wheels turning." The scar also served to remind Todd of his past villainy against Marty. It was applied with glue, and a little makeup was added to make it look more authentic. The application usually took ten minutes.

Todd's long hair was also integral to the character. It was described by Soap Opera Magazine as "enigmatic, with an air of innate authority". The hair was said to demonstrate Todd's lack of pretense and to convey an "I don't care" attitude. Todd's "overhanging brow" seemed threatening, but instead concealed the "intense, vulnerable eyes underneath", features that contrasted well with the character's "pouty, sensual mouth". The features, which conferred "a charming, boyish quality", could sometimes convey that Todd was less dangerous than he actually was. Photographer Robert Milazzo believed Howarth's hair softened Todd's character. "You don't expect that intensity because of it," he said, and felt that it made Todd more intriguing. Milazzo also stated that the combination of Todd's soft hair and intensity made Todd "a very complex character to look at". An interviewer concluded that Howarth was physically attractive and that this may have contributed to the character's magnetism. Howarth replied, "I know what the convention of a good-looking person is, and I know that for some reason skinny white guys are big now. I guess you could blame it on that".

In November 2008, during St. John's portrayal of the character, Todd is given a new scar by John McBain during a physical altercation in which John beats Todd with a gun. The scar symbolized Todd's "second rape of Marty" and was considered "a poetic nod" to Todd's history. The scar was significantly smaller than the original but placed in the same spot; it was gone by January 2009. St. John stated, "I know. It's too bad. I honestly have no idea why they wouldn't keep that reminder on Todd's face. It might be an economical thing. You know it costs to apply that kind of makeup each day".

The most important aspect of Todd's appearance for St. John was his character's hair. His preference was that Todd's hair was a little shorter; he told Soap Opera Weekly (SOW) that he thought that Todd's hair was too "shaggy", which was not his personal style, and that he hoped the writers and producers would let him trim off a bit. When he first got the role, St. John's hair resembled Howarth's shorter chin-length haircut, which was initially worn from 2000 to 2003, and St. John was told by the writers and producers not to change his hair until further notice. St. John "made the creative choice [to let himself] go because [Todd's] not really right in the old noggin'", and gained weight for the role.

=== "Todd's theme" and related music ===
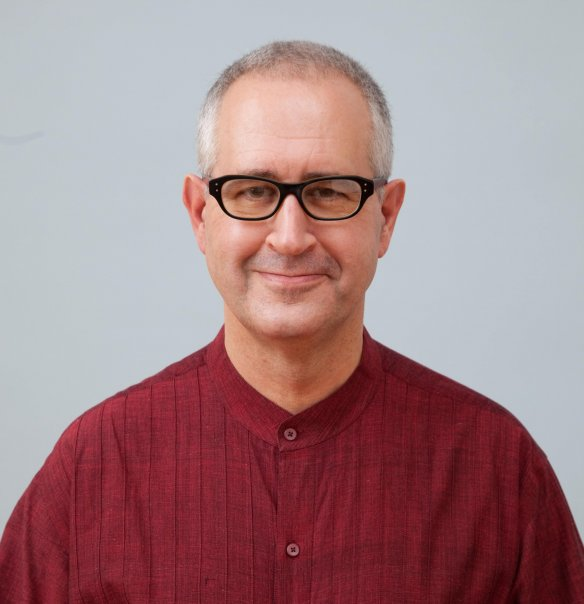
Composer David Nichtern, who wrote much of One Life to Live's music for Todd

"Todd stalks Nora"
The Todd chords heard during the storyline in which he stalks Nora, contrasted by birds chirping in the background.

One Life to Live's producers stated that most of the show's music was custom-written, suitable for the situation and what the characters in the scene might actually play. For Todd, his volatile nature was represented with powerfully dark theme music, which producers and fans called the "Todd theme". The music consisted of ominous low chords and signaled that Todd was about to commit a vicious, dangerous, or threatening act.

Composer David Nichtern, who created Todd's theme music, said he loved the character and enjoyed implementing the different versions of the Todd theme. While describing the music that marked Todd's prominent 1996 "return from the dead" storyline (which documented his return to town after being presumed dead), Nichtern addressed the broader aspect of his composition for the character: "All of Todd's music has had a certain 'vibe' to it, especially since the character is so well-drawn," he stated. "It also has seemed particularly well-suited to my guitar style, so I've enjoyed 'becoming' Todd musically. The key is always to represent his dark side, but with the possibility of redemption and power behind the whole thing." Nichtern added, "That's what makes him such an interesting character. Todd's cues are always custom-made so to speak, so there is energy and attention going toward getting the exact flavor of what the current story-line is saying about his journey."

Three primary musical themes were played throughout Todd's evolution. The original Todd theme, from 1993 to 1996, encompassed Todd's rape of Marty and his early misdeeds. The second theme was heard throughout 1998 and 2000, and the third theme was first heard in 2001. The Todd and Marty rape scene was aided primarily by rock songs. Heard at a low volume in the background, hard rock songs assist moments building up to the rape; they intensify the otherwise implicitly tense, aggressive atmosphere, and set a chilling tone for viewers. When Todd is certain that he will rape Marty, right before going upstairs to Kevin's room where she rests, the volume of a song in the background ("Head Like a Hole" by Nine Inch Nails) is increased, which emphasizes the lyrics: "I'd rather die/Than give you control." This use of background music allowed Todd's motivation for the rape to significantly register with viewers.

The menacing chords which played as Todd stalked and terrorized Nora in 1993 for mishandling his trial and sending him to prison were Todd's theme. There have been additional musical themes for Todd; for example, during his romance with Rebecca in 1994, an all-encompassing romantic theme with tragic nuances, which was at times intermixed with his ominous music, was heard. His rescue of Marty and two children from a car crash, and the Todd and Téa romance, also have their own musical themes. For the mid-1994 plot point where Todd rescues Marty and the children, the music was changed to reflect his decision to be a better person. It becomes his dominant theme, and is assisted by a tuneful, forward-moving melody. This music is primarily a part of Todd's 1994 redemption storyline and the storyline when he is the Lord heir in 1995. According to Nichtern, the music for Todd and Teá, which he composed with his friend keyboardist Kevin Bents, was "as close as we get to Todd 'romantic' music", with "the possibility of a little sensuality and romance".

For the "Todd returns from the dead" 1996 storyline, demented-sounding, on-edge music signifies that Todd's psyche has worsened. This theme accompanied Todd's emotional breakdown and revenge scheme after discovering his wife, Blair, having sex with Patrick.

== Personality ==
At the time of Todd's introduction to OLTL, he was a competitive athlete. His fraternity was the most important part of his life; Howarth stated that Todd was "under intense pressure from the male figures in his life". He felt that the key to understanding Todd was his concern about his status and how others perceived him. He thought that Todd mistreated people because it made him feel better about himself and that he did not want to appear vulnerable, so his defense mechanisms "spun out of control". Howarth, during an April 1994 Soap Opera Update interview, said that the only thing that he admired about Todd was his clothing style. His interviewer called Todd's early fashion sense "grunge, Salvation Army like 'rags'," and Howarth described Todd's later wardrobe as "all Ralph Lauren" and "[d]ouble R.L. 80 dollar pants and a 400-and-something-dollar jacket". St. John, as Todd's second portrayer, described the character as "kind of both good and bad. He's got his good side with his kids, and yet he is conniving and vicious and all those negative things".

The show's writers presented Todd's personality as a combination of dark humor, uncouth behavior, and the essence of a tortured soul; he often delivers one-liners that range from humorous to sadistic. Soap opera columnist Jenn Bishop stated that Todd's personality is "violent, gentle, caring, apathetic, smart, obsessive, crazy, irrational, devilish, heroic, angst-filled, comical, etc." and that "[he] loves, but he feels he's unworthy of true love because of the things he's done. He doesn't love himself and projects a facade of a confident, arrogant playboy, but underneath it all, he's someone who seeks an unattainable love". For example, as portrayed by St. John in 2006, he fights for the custody of his son, Sam, but he is motivated by anger that he has been lied to and by revenge more than by a desire to recover his child. For several years on the series, a defining characteristic of Todd's personality was his resistance to close relationships and sexual intimacy, which were due to his mistreatment by others, especially his adoptive father, who may or man not have raped him when he was fourteen. It was also due to his horrific past misdeeds, including his rape of Marty, and the dysfunctional aspects of his relationship with Blair. Surviving a near-death experience and being presumed dead in 1995, and, upon his return in 1996, finding Blair having sex with Patrick made Todd bitter; seeing Blair with another man sexually, soon after his presumed death, caused him to shut down emotionally. The writers made Todd's fear of intimacy into a prominent obstacle for his relationship with his second wife, Téa. When she at one point attempts to seduce Todd by stripping down naked in front of him and pleading with him to make love to her, he rejects her, explaining that he no longer trusts himself to be intimate in that way; he subsequently throws her out, practically naked, into the middle of a snowstorm. Although viewers were given an explanation for his actions, which included childhood trauma, his crimes were never excused or glossed over, and began to care for people, "something missing in his earlier sociopathic characteristics".

In the 1998 storyline where he fakes dissociative identity disorder (split personalities) to avoid a prison sentence for hostage and threat charges, he is given four personalities that represent his core being: A childlike personality named Tom, Italian playboy Rod, parental figure Miss Perkins, and the abusive Pete (the personality responsible for his worst misdeeds). The revelation that he is faking the personalities devastates Viki, who had actually suffered from the disorder; it also brings out Todd's remorse and inspires him to reflect on his mistakes. The storyline ends with the implication that the personalities may not have been as fabricated as Todd believed them to be. The writers also made it so that his difficulties are manifested in his nightmares, which give him insomnia and are designed as a look into his psyche; at multiple points within the series, Téa attempts to help Todd by encouraging him to open up to her about them, which he eventually does. His opinions on his enemies are conveyed clearly; he remains one step ahead of them, and consistently outsmarts police, family, and others he targets, sometimes using weapons.

== Casting and portrayals ==
=== General ===
Following Howarth's 1992 casting as Todd Manning, he occasionally vacated the role. His 2003 departure was his longest absence from OLTL; he did not return to the series until 2011. Todd was recast in 2003 with St. John, and Howarth joined As the World Turns as Paul Ryan until it was cancelled in 2010. Malone stated that because of Todd's appeal, which he credited to Howarth, "The network was therefore happy to have him return to Llanview whenever Roger would come back, and happy to have him move into story in major ways". In April 2011, after several months of speculation, OLTL confirmed Howarth's return, although it was unclear if he would portray Todd Manning. He stated, "I am looking forward to returning to One Life to Live". Executive producer Frank Valentini said, "We are thrilled to have Roger return to One Life to Live". It was eventually revealed that St. John's version of the character was really Victor Lord, Jr., Todd's twin brother, conditioned to believe that he was Todd and assume Todd's identity, while the real Todd (Howarth) was held hostage for eight years.

OLTL was cancelled in early 2012; Howarth brought Todd to General Hospital (GH), along with his co-stars Kristen Alderson as Starr and Michael Easton as John McBain. All three actors were forced to briefly leave GH when Prospect Park, the company that bought the rights to OLTL and aired an online version of the show in 2013, sued ABC for breach of contract. Prospect Park argued that ABC sabotaged its efforts by killing off two characters, Starr's boyfriend Cole and her young daughter Hope. Both St. John and Howarth appeared on the online version as Victor and Todd, but the suit prevented ABC from continuing to feature Howarth, Alderson, and Easton as their original characters on GH; ABC's solution was to create new characters for the actors. The online version of OLTL was cancelled after one season.

=== Howarth ===
Malone credited Howarth's versatility with the reason he was cast as Todd. During a February 1993 interview with Soap Opera Digest (SOD), Howarth stated he was surprised he won the part. "I really don't know how I made it," he said. He met a One Life to Live casting director two years previously, while performing in a New York play, but when the role of Todd opened up, he "auditioned just like everybody else". He "made it to callbacks, and [he] got the part". Howarth said, "I was hired ... to plant drugs in Jason Webb's jacket. All I knew was that my first name was Todd. I don't know what happened next. They called me in again and suddenly I had a last name 'Manning.' Then I get called to read another day."

Howarth stated, "I was happy to get the part of Todd, but it was the furthest thing from the fabric of my personality". In an interview later that year, with Soap Opera Weekly, he grimaced when reminded of what he had said, and commented, "What a totally self-involved, pretentious thing to say". He clarified his previous statement, saying that although he seemed to be consistently cast as a "bad guy" and as a "Greek frat brother-type", both his upbringing and experiences in college were different than those of Todd and his other roles. For example, Howarth was not in a fraternity in college, and, unlike Todd and his previous soap opera roles, Kent in Loving and Jory on Guiding Light, status was unimportant to him.

Although Howarth was familiar with campus fraternity life while attending George Washington University, he did not base Todd or his other roles on anyone he knew. When asked about his roles, he was unable to explain why he was consistently cast as a bad guy, but said that he enjoyed it. "I would never want to come in now and play a nice guy for three months. That would be dreadfully boring. This suits me fine. It's just as easy to pretend I'm a bad guy as it is to pretend I'm a good guy," Howarth said. Playing a rapist was like playing any other role because "[he knows] it's all make-believe". He was perplexed by writers' need to redeem villains. "Todd's a pretty interesting character just the way he is," Howarth said in late 1994. "There's no need to fix it if it's not broken. I don't know where the whole notion of redeeming characters comes from. People used to say to me, 'I hope you get redeemed so you can stay on the show.' Well, Todd hasn't been redeemed, and he's still on the show." He added, "I don't love the character I play. If I met Todd on the street, I wouldn't say 'Hi' to him, but I do love playing this character."

Howarth said of starring on a soap opera, "Every actor at one time passes through daytime. I wouldn't have said yes to the offer if I didn't want to stay a while on daytime." He added, "I don't crave fame. It's kind of goofy. I didn't want to be a public figure. I wanted to be an actor, not a movie star. But I love rock 'n' roll-there, I'd rather be a rock star. That would be cool." He said that "like all soap actors," he sticks with the script the majority of the time, "but every now and then he goes off the page," commenting, "You get to direct yourself. You come up with a little bit. It's improvisational. Maybe you're doing it just for your castmates, but the audience catches on."

In 1997 and 1998, Todd was given comedic partners similar to the set-up in comedy teams, in which the "funny guy" usually has a "straight man" who either sets up the joke or simply does not understand it. Todd's first partner was Charlie Briggs, portrayed by actor Robert J. Hogan. Hogan was first seen as Briggs in 1995, working for the rival publication The Banner before Todd "[steals] him away" to work at his newspaper. Hogan said, "Briggs had been on the show for 17 years, but they never showed him." Scenes between Todd and Briggs typically involved Todd issuing "some bizarre order" to Briggs, or Todd asking Briggs a "way-out question" that was often "way out of line". During these scenes, Briggs would often respond with a stupefied look on his face. Though Briggs appeared lost at some of Todd's comments, Todd was sometimes unable to realize that the joke was about him. Hogan felt Briggs was "more than a match" for Todd. "You look at a kid yelling at you," he said, "and you can't take him seriously".

Howarth on set with Todd's pet parrot Moose; the bird was portrayed by two South American blue and gold macaws.

Another of Todd's comedic pairings is his friendship with a parrot he names Moose. Todd is closer to Moose than he is to most humans. He tells the bird his private thoughts and secrets, which causes conflict and antagonism between Moose and his wife at the time, Téa. Florencia Lozano, Téa's portrayer, stated, "My character ... has a very adversarial relationship with the bird ... It's sort of jealous of me, I'm jealous of the bird. We're both trying to get close to Todd." The bird was portrayed by two South American blue and gold macaws named Flash and Lucky, and an Animal Planet documentary stated that they had developed an "impressive résumé" by the time they appeared on OLTL. They were trained by Ed Richman, who had worked with the birds for fifteen years in TV shows such as Magnum, P.I. and Jake and the Fatman. Richman stated that Howarth caught on "real quick" regarding his interaction with Flash and Lucky and said that he was the best actor he had worked with in the industry. The parrots were used for different purposes: for intimidating scenes where it looked like Moose "was going to kill somebody", Richman used Flash, and Lucky was used for the "loving, very caring, physically close" portrayal of Moose. Like other actors, the parrots were able to connect, in character, with their fellow cast members and achieve comedic timing with them. Voice actor Ron Gallop was hired to deliver Moose's lines, which were crafted to help demonstrate Todd's train of thought, signified Todd and Moose's close bond, and consisted of funny or insulting remarks aimed at anyone causing problems for Todd.

=== St. John ===
Howarth's departure from the series motivated OLTL's writers and producers to do what many considered impossible: recast Todd. During Michael Malone's second stint as head writer of OLTL, he had to decide if Todd would remain. Malone said that he and the other creators could not allow Todd to permanently leave the show's canvas, so they chose to recast the role. They offered the role to Easton, who had portrayed the vampire Caleb Morley on the soap opera Port Charles, but he turned it down because he did not want to be affiliated with a role played by another established actor. Malone said that St. John's audition was "extraordinary", and that although a committee was involved in the recast, everyone agreed "he was Todd". Malone felt that they made a risky decision, but St. John made it work and that he had made the character his own. Initially, St. John, in his first role in daytime television, was introduced as Walker Laurence, younger brother of Mitch Laurence.

Author Gerry Waggett stated that Walker was "reinvented as Todd with plastic surgery" after the show's viewers accepted St. John as a part of the cast. The soap opera press and fans speculated for several months that Todd had been recast with St. John. Website Soap Central.com stated that despite executive producer Frank Valentini neither confirming nor denying it, St. John's character exhibited "Todd-like" behavior. TV Guide confirmed the speculation and reported that St. John, when asked about it, stated, "That would be fascinating, though I don't see how it would work," and added, "Todd [had] a different voice and height, but this is a soap world and anything can happen."

St. John's version of Todd had undergone plastic surgery after being severely beaten during a murder attempt on his life ordered by Mitch Laurence. While recovering in the hospital, Todd conducts research and learns Mitch has a brother named Walker (also portrayed by St. John), who goes by the name Flynn Laurence. Todd pays Flynn for information on Mitch, and has extensive plastic surgery in order to physically resemble Flynn and get revenge on (as well as protect his family from) Mitch. The writers revealed Walker's true identify slowly, allowing Walker to develop as a new character before hinting that he could be Todd.

St. John was unaware that Malone and the producers of OLTL were considering him as Todd, but had no strategy in his performance once he won the role. When speaking of the recast, he stated, "It's nice, because I had instant concrete relationships". He liked that he could consult old scripts and his fellow cast members to gain information about his character, resources he did not have when playing Walker. He was able to use these resources to figure out his relationship to other characters, which helped him analyze how to play a scene. St. John stated that as an actor, he let the audience interpret the character, and believed in exploring and portraying the moment as it was written in the script. He said, "Todd is already written on the page, so it's my job to bring him to life in that moment".

St. John was instructed by the show's directors to watch about fifteen episodes of Howarth's performances of Todd because they wanted him to portray Todd like Howarth did. St. John reported that he watched two episodes, but never tried to mimic Howarth's style because he felt that it was limiting, uncreative, and destructive. He said, "I needed to get a sense of who Todd was first, and that has to happen organically". He did not care if Marlon Brando portrayed the role before him, and said that even actors who portray Hamlet do it differently, adding, "I don't care what the other guy did. That's his time". St. John felt that it was up to him to decide how to perform Todd. "I know that sounds very arrogant and overconfident," he stated, "but it would be no fun to try to mimic somebody".

Unlike how most actors are trained, St. John believed that it was not up to the performer to interpret the character, but that a character existed regardless of how an actor played him, which he realized was "an unusual way to approach acting". He also thought that playing Todd was fun and "never boring to watch" because Todd, although popular with the audience, is an unlikable character. St. John told Branco that when people asked him if Todd was capable of harming his loved ones, like his long-time love Blair or daughter Starr, St. John would say that Todd was capable of anything, even being sexually attracted to Starr or one of her friends, because to state otherwise meant that he was "limiting the character". He added, "Todd is a marvelous character to play because he could commit genocide, or find a cure for AIDS. He's full of possibilities—good and bad ... See, as an actor that always gives you conflict to play—and that subtext enriches a performance".

=== Recast ===
When Todd was recast with St. John after Howarth's departure, many fans felt that, like the roles of Luke Spencer (Anthony Geary) on General Hospital and Erica Kane (Susan Lucci) on All My Children, Todd should be portrayed only by the actor who had originated the role. As Soap Opera Digest put it, "Few recasts caused more uproar". Soap Opera Digest also stated that while there were fans who "will only consider Howarth to be their beloved Todd", St. John won over many fans by putting a lighter spin on the character. Soap Opera Weekly stated that they were "on board with St. John". Soap Opera Digest agreed, commenting that St. John made the transition believable while adding new facets to the character. The magazine also stated that Todd's new appearance contributed to his ongoing redemption.

In late 2006, St. John and Howarth simultaneously began contract negotiations with their respective shows, which caused rumors that St. John was departing from OLTL, leaving room for Howarth, who was with the soap opera As the World Turns at the time, to return as Todd. TV Guide sought to clear up the matter and questioned executive producer Frank Valentini, who stated that although he was not able to comment on contracts, the producers were "doing our best to make sure that we do right by the audience". In 2007, TV Guide received official confirmation that Howarth would not be returning to the series. The magazine conducted a poll on its website, TV Guide.com, and found that 82 percent of the show's viewers wanted to see Howarth return. Daniel R. Coleridge of TV Guide.com disagreed with the results, stating, "Perhaps I'm in the minority, but I absolutely adore Trevor St. John", whose portrayal of Todd he found "very cocky, arrogant and humorous in a sexy way".

In 2009, following the announcement that As the World Turns would be cancelled in 2010, rumors that Howarth would return to OLTL regained momentum. The rumors were further fueled by an August 2010 episode of OLTL, in which Howarth's picture was shown and a delirious Téa stated that the current Todd (St. John) was not Todd Manning. This resulted in what Dan Kroll of the website Soap Opera Central.com described as fans "rac[ing] to their computers to figure out the meaning of the scene". Kroll speculated that the scene was "crafted merely to get fans talking, or was it a hint to viewers something big was coming down the pike?" Soap Opera Network, citing unnamed sources and pointing to the 2010 episode, reported on their website that they had "learned exclusively Howarth [would] indeed be returning" to the series in the near future. Soap Opera Digest columnist, Carolyn Hinsey, dismissed the report, stating on her Facebook page, "Seriously, stop with the Howarth misinformation here please. He is not coming back to OLTL. Case closed." Some fans were convinced that St. John's character was an impostor, while others were not; although Howarth eventually returned as Todd in 2011, his return was initially accompanied by fan debate regarding what role he would play, Todd Manning or a new character.

== Reception and impact ==
In 1994, OLTL was awarded several Daytime Emmys in writing and acting for all the principals involved in the gang rape storyline. Michael Malone and Josh Griffith's team won an Emmy for writing, Susan Haskell won an Emmy for Outstanding Supporting Actress in a Drama Series, and Hillary B. Smith was awarded the Daytime Emmy Award for Outstanding Lead Actress in a Drama Series. Howarth won the Daytime Emmy Award for Outstanding Younger Actor in a Drama Series. In 1995, Howarth was nominated for an Outstanding Supporting Actor in a Drama Series and Soap Opera Digest (SOD) named him Outstanding Leading Actor. SOD also named him Outstanding Villain in 1998. While Howarth has been called a "fan favorite, and one of the best actors in soaps", Todd has been called "one of the greatest characters of all-time" and Howarth's portrayal of him has been called "iconic".The Hollywood Reporter stated that even though Todd was a convicted rapist, he was the most popular character, and Howarth was the most popular actor on OLTL.

According to Waggett, the rape storyline propelled Todd "onto the list of OLTL's most despicable villains". He said that due to the storyline and to Howarth's talent, Todd "became the show's next centerpiece villain and eventually the show's male lead". Howarth appeared on several interview shows following his Emmy win in 1994, including the Phil Donahue Show in May, with six other male soap stars, and later that month, on Live! with Regis and Kathie Lee. Host Regis Philbin commented on the fact that Howarth was receiving more fan mail than any other American soap opera star, and called him "a terrible villain, who's become a heartthrob to thousands of wildly adoring fans". TV Guide referred to Todd as a breakout character.

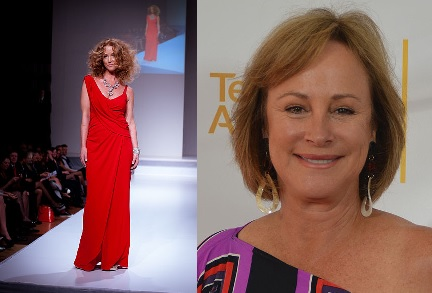
Susan Haskell (Marty) and Hillary B. Smith (Nora), who, along with Howarth, won acting Emmys in 1994 for their roles in the gang rape storyline.

At the height of Todd's popularity, which was called "Todd-mania" and "the Todd Manning phenomenon", Howarth was disturbed that so many women were attracted to Todd and that the show's writers had begun to redeem the character. In a September 1995 interview with The Hollywood Reporter, the publication stated that Howarth was troubled that "his villainous character became such a fan favorite". In October 1995, Howarth told SOD, "People have come up to me and said, 'My 7-year-old loves you.' What do I say to that? I'm not going to tell them, 'Don't let your 7-year-old watch TV.' But I have to say, it's disturbing." He gave credit to the show's writers for Todd's popularity, saying that the rapists' trial was well constructed and added, "I think, right now, we're just riding the wave of something that started last summer. Beyond that, I don't really know why people like Todd".

Todd's rampant popularity intruded on Howarth's life. "It's really starting to frustrate me because I can't just go to work anymore," he said. He stopped doing a lot of press interviews after female fans screamed "Rape me, Todd" at fan events, and because of his disagreement with Todd's redemption arc. His comings and goings from time to time throughout the years, even though the role of Todd had been re-cast with St. John, were greeted with anticipation, excitement, and speculation from the fans. In 2000, Howarth returned for a week, accompanied by significant fanfare, to assist with Florencia Lozano's (Teá) departure. During the ten years he was on the show, rumors of his departure were reported by the soap opera press on a sometimes weekly basis.

Soap Opera Magazine attributed the success of Todd to Howarth's skill as an actor. In February 1998, the magazine stated, "Although the scar that traverses his face while he plays Llanview's dark prince isn't real, the menacing intensity Roger Howarth can so effortlessly convey with his eyes and furrowed brow are frighteningly authentic". Soap Opera Weekly called his presence "hypnotic" and stated that his eyes relayed his focus. The magazine added that Howarth "has given Todd such a deliciously frightening edge we hope he wreaks more havoc in Llanview". Marla Hart of the Chicago Tribune stated that "it has been an unexpected pleasure to watch actor Roger Howarth as a lost soul in search of spiritual redemption". Hart speculated that the darkness Howarth brought to the role made him interesting to watch and was responsible for his Emmy win in 1994.

St. John and the writers received praise for the recast and for successfully re-integrating Todd into the show's canvas. Soap Opera Weekly stated, "They said it couldn't be done. One Life to Live's Todd (previously played by Roger Howarth) could not be recast. But with an appealing actor and the right pacing, One Life to Live may just have done it". The magazine stated that the writers revealed Todd's identity gradually, allowing Walker to develop as a character before dropping hints that he might be Todd. By the time he disclosed who he really was to his daughter Starr, the audience had already suspected the truth. Soap Opera Weekly called the reveal scene between St. John and Alderson, who played Starr, "one of those great (and, these days, rare) must-see moments". Soap Opera Digest said that despite the recast, a difficult situation in and of itself, "St. John aptly distinguished between Walker, who's really Todd, as well as Flynn, who pretended to be Walker". The magazine stated that St. John revealed glimmers of Todd to the audience: "We could see Todd when Walker lowered his eyes while holding back from telling his sister, Viki; with fiancée Blair, Walker's gaze was always shifting, making sure nothing could clue her in to his secret". The article also credited St. John with maintaining "the [uniquely scheming] relationship of Todd and Starr" and for keeping their scenes touching and delightful.

== Depiction of rape ==
One Life to Live was one of the first soap operas to address social issues, including rape. Rape has been a long-standing subject of soap operas; as critic Mary Buhl Dutta put it, rape was "a part of the discourse of soap opera long before its acceptance into that of the larger society", but the gang rape storyline presented the crime of rape to the audience differently than it had been in the past, in other soap operas. The storyline, including the rape and its three-year-long consequences, was called "the most daring plot ever attempted on soaps", and was regarded as "the gold standard of rape stories", and inspired feminist studies.

The character of Todd Manning was intended to be short-lived, but this changed when Howarth's portrayal inspired notable fan reaction. OLTL's head writer, Michael Malone, decided to write a redemption storyline for Todd, something Howarth was opposed to, which eventually led to him leaving the show in 2003.

Scholars have noted the storyline's similarity to 19th-century melodrama and both supported and went against rape myths. It conforms to many of the same conventions of how rape has been presented in both soap operas and in literature and films, including the rapists' trial, which dominated the show throughout the summer of 1993. The storyline used many archetypes commonly used in other types of literature. The storyline was also called "Dickensonian" and Todd was compared to Mary Shelley's Frankenstein. The writers moved to redeem Todd in order to keep him and his portrayer as a part of the show, using "a whole arsenal of symbolic weaponry," something that had never happened in soap operas before.

== Works cited ==
- Brooks, Dianne L. (1997). "Rape on Soaps: The Legal Angle". In Fineman, Martha; McCluskey (eds.). Feminism, Media, and the Law (Martha T ed.). New York: Oxford University Press. pp. 104–119. ISBN 978-0-19-509628-6.
- Dutta, Mary Buhl (1999). "Taming the Victim: Rape in Soap Opera". Journal of Popular Film & Television. 27 (1): 34–39. doi:10.1080/01956059909602795.
- Hayward, Jennifer (1997). Consuming Pleasures: Active Audiences and Serial Fictions from Dickens to Soap Opera. Lexington, Kentucky: The University Press of Kentucky. ISBN 0-8131-2025-X.
- Waggett, Gerry (2008). The One Life to Live 40th Anniversary Trivia Book: A Fun, Fact-Filled, Everything-You-Want-to-Know-Guide to Your Favorite Soap. New York: Hyperion Books. ISBN 978-1-4013-2309-7.
