= Christopher Douglas (American actor) =

American actor

- Born: Christopher W. Douglas; Knoxville, Tennessee, US
- Occupation: Actor
- Years active: 1994–2008
- Spouse: Darcy Douglas (m. 2007)

Christopher W. Douglas is an American actor, best known for roles on the soap operas One Life to Live as Dylan Moody (1994–1997, 2000) and Passions as Antonio Lopez-Fitzgerald (2001–2004, 2008). in 1994, he appeared in Tori Amos music video for her song Cornflake Girl.

== Biography ==
Douglas studied briefly at the University of Tennessee and has worked as a model. In 2008, Chris Douglas has also hosted the reality television series Feeding Frenzy on Animal Planet.
