= Hank Gannon =

- One Life to Live character
- Portrayed by: Nathan Purdee
- Duration: 1992–2003; 2009
- First appearance: January 31, 1992
- Last appearance: April 8, 2009
- Created by: Michael Malone
- Introduced by: Linda Gottlieb; Frank Valentini (2009)
- Crossover appearances: All My Children
In-universe information
- Other names: Henry Gannon (birth name)
- Occupation: Lawyer; College professor; Football coach
- Mother: Janine Gannon
- Brothers: R. J. Gannon
- Wife: Nora Hanen (pre-1992); Sheila Price (1995–96)
- Daughters: Rachel Gannon
- Aunts: Clara
- Nieces: Keri Reynolds
- Other relatives: Jamie Vega

Hank Gannon is a fictional character from the American ABC soap opera One Life to Live.

== Casting ==
The role of Hank was originated by actor Nathan Purdee on January 31, 1992. Purdee continued regularly appearing in the role until July 18, 2003, and he returned for three episodes in April 2009.

== Storylines ==
Divorced attorney Hank Gannon arrives in fictional Llanview hired to defend Sarah Gordon Buchanan (Jensen Buchanan) in the murder of Carlo Hesser (Thom Christopher). In 1993, he finds himself as the prosecuting district attorney head-to-head against ex-wife Nora Hanen (Hillary B. Smith) in the infamous Todd Manning and Marty Saybrooke rape trial. Nora throws the case upon uncovering evidence implicating Todd in the rape, although Todd never serves jail time.

After years of prosecuting Llanview criminals, Hank leaves his post as district attorney in 2003 after mishandling of the Mitch Laurence (Roscoe Born) murder case. He returns to Llanview with his daughter Rachel in April 2009 upon the news that Nora's son Matthew (Eddie Alderson) was paralyzed in a car accident.

== Reception ==
In 2020, Candace Young and Charlie Mason put Hank on their list of Daytime's Most Important African-American Characters, commenting "By the time we met Nathan Purdee's "The Cannon," he'd already traded the football field for the courtroom" and that he was a "mvp" who could "still score".
