= Susan Batten =

American stage and television actress

- Education: University of North Carolina School of the Arts; Columbia University
- Occupations: Actress; producer; screenwriter

Susan Batten is an American actress, producer and writer.

== Early life and education ==
Raised in Clayton, North Carolina, Batten graduated from University of North Carolina School of the Arts and Columbia University School of the Arts.

== Career ==
Batten portrayed Luna Moody Holden on One Life to Live from 1991 to 1995.

In New York City, Batten was a member of The Edge Theatre company, along with Mary-Louise Parker, Peter Hedges and Joe Mantello. Off-Broadway, she co-starred with Julie Harris in The Fiery Furnace, and portrayed Connor Walsh on CBS's As The World Turns in 1997–98.

She guest-starred in sitcoms and dramas on ABC, CBS and Fox before she began her writing career. Batten earned her MFA from Columbia University School Of The Arts in screenwriting and directing, and was the recipient of the Dean's Fellowship. She wrote and produced the film Showing Roots starring Maggie Grace, Uzo Aduba, Elizabeth McGovern, Adam Broady and Cicely Tyson. She co-wrote Love, Once and Always for Hallmark Channel.

== Filmography ==
=== Film ===
Year	Title	Role	Notes
2016	Showing Roots	Betty	
2021	The Same Storm	Holly	

=== Television ===
Year	Title	Role	Notes
1987–1990	All My Children	Lolly / Deborah	
1991–1995	One Life to Live	Luna Moody	
1995	Lois & Clark: The New Adventures of Superman	Leigh-Anne Stipanovic	Episode: "Chip Off the Old Clark"
1995	The Client	Dora Dietrich	Episode: "The Way Things Never Were"
1996	Hijacked: Flight 285	Kim Paulsen	Television film
1996	The Crew	Heidi	Episode: "Winds of Change: Part 1"
1997	As the World Turns	Connor Walsh	19 episodes
2022-23, 2025	General Hospital	Flora Gardens	5 episodes
