= Feeding Frenzy (TV series) =

- Genre: Documentary / Reality / Animals
- Starring: Christopher Douglas
- Narrated by: Christopher Douglas
- Country of origin: United States
- Original language: English
- No. of seasons: 1
- No. of episodes: 4

Production
- Executive producers: Deirdre Gurney; Scott Gurney; Bobby Pura
- Producer: Gurney Productions
- Running time: 60 minutes (with commercials)

Original release
- Network: Animal Planet
- Release: October 26, 2008 – November 2008

Feeding Frenzy is a four-part American documentary reality television mini-series that premiered in 2008 on Animal Planet. The program follows, stars, and is hosted and narrated by actor Christopher Douglas. In the show, Douglas sits inside a transparent, cubical plastic box while filming canivorous predators, which are attracted to the bait and surround the box.

== Episodes ==
No.	Title	Original release date
1	"Lion Feeding Frenzy"	October 26, 2008
2	"Bear Feeding Frenzy"	November 9, 2008
3	"Crocodile Feeding Frenzy"	November 9, 2008
4	"Shark Feeding Frenzy"	2008

== See also ==
- Animal Planet
- List of programs broadcast by Animal Planet
