= Jennifer Pepperman =

American television director and producer

Jennifer Pepperman is an American television soap opera director and producer who is working for All Elite Wrestling (AEW) as Vice President of Content Development.

A veteran of several shows, Pepperman was executive producer of the short-lived Prospect Park online reboot of One Life to Live. She is also known for her work in WWE.

== Positions held ==
As the World Turns

- Director (August 2004- September 2010)
- Occasional Director (2004)
- Associate Director (2000- August 2004)

Guiding Light

- Production Coordinator (Mid-1990s)

One Life to Live

- Executive Producer (April 2013–August 2013)
- Director (May 2011- January 2012)
- Associate Director (2010)
- Coordinating Producer (1998-2000)

== Awards and nominations ==
Daytime Emmy Award

- Win, 2007, Directing Team, As the World Turns
- Nomination, 2001-2003, Directing Team, As the World Turns
- Nomination, 2000, Directing Team, One Life to Live

Preceded by Frank Valentini	Executive Producer of One Life to Live; April 29 – August 19, 2013	Succeeded by Show canceled
