= Linda Gottlieb =

American film producer

- Born: New Jersey, U.S.
- Education: Wellesley College; Columbia University (MA)
- Occupations: Television writer; film producer
- Years active: 1972–present

Linda Gottlieb is an American television writer and film producer. She is best known for her work as a producer on Dirty Dancing, as well as her work as executive producer on One Life to Live.

== Biography ==
Born in New Jersey, Gottlieb graduated from Wellesley College and received an M.A. from Columbia University in history.

Gottlieb was a presenter on Face of a Stranger, written by Marsha Norman. She was also executive producer of the 2003 film Soldier's Girl. She also produced the soap 13 Bourbon Street for Fox, but it never aired.

As of 2011, Gottlieb lived in New York City with her husband.

== Career ==
=== Production credits ===
==== Films ====
- Limbo (1972), film starring Kate Jackson
- The Immigrant Experience: The Long Long Journey (1972)
- The Fur Coat Club (1973), film short
- Summer of My German Soldier (1978), made-for-TV movie
- The Mating Season (1980)
- We're Fighting Back (1981), TV movie
- The Electric Grandmother (January 17, 1982), a television movie that originally aired on NBC as a 60-minute "Peacock Project" special
- Dirty Dancing (1987)
- Citizen Cohn (1992) cable TV film
- The Gentleman Bandit (2002)
- Soldier's Girl (2003)

==== Television episodes, series, and specials ====
- 13 Bourbon Street (1997), TV pilot
- One Life to Live (Executive Producer: 1991- 1994); replaced Paul Rauch; hired Michael Malone and Josh Griffith. Entertainment Weekly wrote: "OLTL (circa late 1991–1994) was airing some of the most literate drama ever to hit daytime—too good to be called 'soap opera.'"
- SoapLine, a TV series characterized as "a joint production of ABC News and ABC Daytime to bring viewers storyline updates, special features and interviews during breaks in live, pre-emptive coverage of the O. J. Simpson trial"

=== Teaching ===
She is an adjunct professor (Master Class in Screenwriting: One on One with a Producer) at Tisch School of the Arts.

== Awards and nominations ==
Gottlieb has been nominated for 5 Daytime Emmy Awards, Outstanding Children's Anthology/Dramatic Programming (1980), and Outstanding Children's Entertainment Special (1977 & 1979), for three Emmy Awards (1979, 1982 & 1993), and for an Independent Spirit Award (1988) and a Peabody Award.
