= Mitch Laurence =

- One Life to Live character
- Portrayed by: Roscoe Born
- Duration: 1985–1987, 2002–2003, 2009–2010, 2012
- First appearance: 1985
- Last appearance: January 9, 2012
- Created by: Peggy O'Shea
- Introduced by: Paul Rauch
In-universe information
- Other names: Michael Lazarus; The Messenger (by followers)
- Occupation: Cult leader
- Brothers: Walker Laurence; Miles Laurence
- Spouse: Natalie Buchanan (2002–03); Dorian Lord (2003)
- Sons: Schuyler Joplin

Mitch Laurence is a fictional character from the ABC daytime soap opera One Life to Live. He was portrayed by Roscoe Born from 1985 to 1987 and again from 2002 to 2003. Born returned from November 9, 2009, to April 6, 2010. Born reappeared again during the series finale prison break storyline on January 3, 2012.

Arriving in 1985 and soon wreaking havoc in fictional Llanview, villain Mitch's storyline climaxes in 1986 with his apparent murder, during a season in which the series rose from #4 to #3 in the Nielsen ratings. He reappears alive in 2002 seeking to exact his revenge on long running One Life to Live heroine Viki Lord Buchanan; seemingly killed again in 2003, he is resurrected a second time in 2009.

== Storylines ==
=== 1985–87 ===
Charismatic Mitch Laurence arrives in Llanview in 1985 and sets his sights on ex-girlfriend Tina Clayton, who has just discovered that she is the daughter of deceased millionaire Victor Lord. Finding out that Victor's estate will revert to Tina if Victor's other daughter Viki Lord Buchanan has a relapse of her multiple personality disorder, Mitch convinces Tina to assist him in his plan to do just that. But when Tina realizes that Mitch actually intends to murder Viki's husband Clint Buchanan and frame Viki, she tries to stop him. Mitch kills Harry O'Neill instead, and Tina is arrested. Tina is later exonerated, and Mitch is sent to prison; he "finds God" and manages to be freed, soon becoming the leader of a religious cult and preying upon his young female disciples. Mitch is eventually "killed" on July 18, 1986, by a blow to the back of the head from Dorian Lord as he attempts to rape her daughter, Cassie Callison. However, he is actually still alive and orchestrates the kidnapping of Clint and Viki Buchanan's newborn daughter Jessica by his follower Allison Perkins (daughter of Statesville Prison's warden). Jessica is eventually returned,

On April 1, 1987, Mitch is seen again—this time as a voyager on the “Star Ascension", during Viki's out-of-body experience as she suffered from a brain aneurysm. During the high-stakes dream, which dictates whether she would live or die, Viki is able to ultimately destroy his power over her.

=== 2002–03 ===
Natalie Balsom arrives in Llanview in 2001, revealing that she is the biological daughter of Viki and Clint Buchanan. At first it is believed that when Allison Perkins had kidnapped the Buchanan baby in 1987, another child was returned and grew up to be Jessica. But when a DNA test on Jessica proves that she is also Viki's daughter, the real story comes out. Mitch Laurence had secretly raped and drugged Viki around the same time she conceived a child with Clint. Viki unknowingly became pregnant with fraternal twins, one fathered by Clint (Natalie) and the other fathered by Mitch (Jessica). Dr. Walter Balsom, who had been one of Mitch's disciples, took Mitch's daughter during delivery, and Viki never knew she'd had more than one child. Mitch, however, wanted his daughter to grow up loved by Viki in the lap of luxury, and he sent Allison to kidnap Clint's child. After replacing her with Mitch's daughter (who would become Jessica), they gave Clint's daughter (who would become Natalie) to Dr. Balsom and his wife Roxy.

In 2002, Mitch returns from the dead; he had not actually died at Dorian's hands, but Dr. Balsom had helped him make it look that way. As "Michael Lazarus", Mitch woos Natalie into marriage. The union is soon annulled when his true identity is revealed, but in 2003 Mitch marries a newly returned-to-town Dorian, who wants in on Mitch's true plan: to take control of Victor Lord's estate. A very-much-alive Victor has been living in seclusion but is now in need of a heart transplant; Mitch promises him a perfect match in exchange for his fortune, and Victor agrees. Mitch's own daughter Jessica has the matching organ, but he offers up Natalie instead; Viki's arrival stops the operation, and Victor soon dies in front of his shocked daughter. Later, Jessica accidentally pushes Mitch into the Llantano River. Mitch regains his sight (after an accident had blinded him) and is rescued by Viki's half-brother Victor Lord Jr. (who is impersonating Mitch's brother Walker). Mitch kidnaps Jessica; Viki and Antonio rescue her and Mitch is arrested. He is later released from jail by Victor, who leads him to the docks to make an escape. Mitch tries to kill Victor. Jessica appears and knocks Mitch over the head with a lead pipe, killing him instantly. Not wanting Jessica to take the blame, Victor plants false evidence to point suspicion at others. The body is discovered by Tina's daughter Sarah Roberts, and though Victor and Jessica each confess to killing Mitch, Police Commissioner Bo Buchanan is inclined to look the other way and abandon the case.

=== 2009–10 ===
In 2009, Jessica is unnerved when someone makes it appear as though her deceased husband Nash Brennan is alive and stalking her. Natalie's husband Jared Banks appears responsible until Mitch reappears to a stunned Jessica, Natalie, and Jared in California on November 9, 2009. Meanwhile, in Michigan, Roxy's son Rex Balsom's long search for the truth reveals that his biological father is Mitch. Mitch shoots Jared to death and is jailed; on December 3, 2009, he pops out of Jared's coffin during the funeral service, having been released after a mix-up with the evidence against him. On December 8, 2009, a distraught Natalie stabs Mitch, who survives. In January 2010, new mayor Dorian Lord gives in to Mitch's threats against her family and effects Mitch's release from jail. He soon kidnaps Jessica as part of his plan to kidnap Rex's soon-to-be-born baby with Stacy Morasco and have Jessica raise the child in captivity. His plan foiled, Mitch is furious when Dorian betrays him and vows revenge.

Dorian's sister, Melinda, turns up dead. It is then later revealed that Schuyler Joplin is Mitch's biological son with Roxy and therefore Rex is not, as the two babies were switched on the night they were born by Allison years before. After this, it is briefly mentioned Mitch is still alive and has been taken to Statesville Prison.

=== 2012 ===
On January 3, 2012, Mitch, along the other inmates, escapes from Statesville prison and goes directly to Llanfair to see Jessica again. There, he meets Natalie and brags about killing her former husband, Jared. Natalie shoves Mitch down onto the sofa and starts strangling him. She turns to run, but Mitch puts her in a headlock. He grabs her by the hair and starts to head upstairs. They hear Liam's cry through the baby monitor. Mitch thinks it is his grandson, Ryder. From the staircase, Clint calls out that Viki is taking care of the baby. When he enters the living room, Mitch pulls a gun on him. Clint makes a move for the gun, and Mitch slams it down hard on Clint's back.

With Clint unconscious, he takes Natalie, now a hostage, to a church where he believes his followers will celebrate his escape from Statesville. Meanwhile, John discovers a hurt Clint, and he tells John what had happened. At the same time, Viki comes down stairs to find out Natalie has been kidnapped by Mitch. Mitch soon calls Llanfair and demands a trade: He will give Natalie back for his daughter, Jessica. Jessica arrives and agrees to help save her sister. However, Viki and Clint want John to devise a plan where Jessica is not involved. John and Jessica eventually go to the church where Mitch and Natalie were, finding Mitch preparing to rape Natalie. John and Mitch soon reached an impasse on how the trade should be executed. After a lot of arguing and gun pointing, Jessica is handed over to Mitch, letting Natalie free. Jessica responds to Mitch's happiness by spitting in his face, quickly angering Mitch. Ford shows up and fights with Mitch until he is hit by a falling chandelier after Mitch's gun goes off. Ford is sent to the hospital. Mitch grabs Natalie and puts his gun to her head, again. John tells Mitch it is over, while he believes everything has just begun. Natalie indicates to John to take a shot at Mitch, which he does. Mitch falls to the ground after taking a bullet to the chest, seemingly finishing him off for good.

John asks Natalie if she would like him to make certain Mitch is dead. Natalie replies, "Well, it is Mitch," alluding to his several previous "deaths". Mitch is, in fact, not dead and, after quickly reviving, he begins to fight John for control of a handgun. Several shots ring out and Mitch falls dead, courtesy of Natalie. She finds some closure in being the one to have finally killed Mitch Laurence. When last seen, Mitch's spirit is forcibly escorted to hell by the spirits of Stacy Morasco and Eddie Ford, and Stacy tells Mitch that Allison lied to him about Jessica being his biological child.
