= Victor Lord =

- One Life to Live character
- Ernest Graves as Victor Lord
- Portrayed by: Ernest Graves (1968–1974); Shepperd Strudwick (1974–1976); Tom O'Rourke (1985); Les Tremayne (1987); Fritz Weaver (1988); Bill Moor (1993–1995); Terry Caza (1994–1995); William Stone Mahoney (2003–2004)
- Duration: 1968–1976; 1985; 1987–1988; 1993–1995; 2003–2004
- First appearance: July 15, 1968
- Last appearance: May 19, 2004
- Created by: Agnes Nixon
- Introduced by: Doris Quinlan
In-universe information
- Other names: Victor Dalby Lord
- Occupation: Media proprietor; Businessman
- Family: Lord
- Brothers: Clayton-Powell Lord
- Sisters: Gwendolyn Lord
- Spouse: Eugenia Randolph (194?–50); Irene Manning (divorced); Dorian Cramer (1975–83) (Note: Though Victor Lord "died" in 1976, he appeared alive (and then died again) in 2003. At that time it was noted on-air that Victor and Dorian's marriage would have been dissolved anyway seven years after his "legal" death (1983), making her marriage to Herb Callison invalid but subsequent marriages legal.)
- Sons: Tony Lord (Note: According to a statement made by Jean Randolph, Tony is Victor's oldest child.); Todd Manning; Victor Lord, Jr.
- Daughters: Victoria Lord; Meredith Lord (Note: Victor always questioned Meredith's paternity, however, her paternity was never actually dis-proven.); Tina Lord
- Grandsons: Brian Kendall; Daniel Wolek; Kevin Buchanan; Joey Buchanan; C. J. Roberts; Jack Manning; Sam Manning; Victor Lord III
- Granddaughters: Megan Gordon; Jessica Buchanan; Natalie Buchanan; Sarah Roberts; Starr Manning; Danielle Manning
- Grandparents: Randolph Lord; Virginia Fletcher
- Nephews: Clayton-Powell Lord II; Richard Abbott

Victor Dalby Lord is a fictional character and patriarch of the Lord family from the American soap opera One Life to Live.

An original protagonist on the series, Victor is introduced in the first episode as the preeminent mass media magnate of fictional Philadelphia Main Line suburb Llanview, Pennsylvania. Victor was originally and most notably played by actor Ernest Graves. Graves debuted July 15, 1968, and played the role until he left the series and last appeared in March 1974.

Series creator Agnes Nixon and executive producer Doris Quinlan subsequently recast Victor to Shepperd Strudwick, who first appeared in December 1974 and played the role until the character's initial onscreen death in June 1976.

== Character background ==
=== Conception ===
Series creator and then-scriptwriter Agnes Nixon originally created the character of Victor Lord based on her father, Harry Eckhardt. She crafted the role in an attempt to understand the reserved, domineering Eckhardt patriarch, an entrepreneur who financially thrived during the Great Depression manufacturing funeral garments.

=== Casting and development ===
Ernest Graves played the role from show's first episode in 1968 through March 1974. Shepperd Strudwick took over the role in December 1974, playing Victor continually through the character's onscreen death June 16, 1976. Tom O'Rourke briefly stepped into the role as a mirage in 1985, and Les Tremayne played the role of Victor in Heaven in 1987. Bill Moor and Terry Caza both appeared in the role in flashbacks from 1994 to 1995. The character was briefly brought back to life 26 years after his original death in January 2003, portrayed by William Stone Mahoney; the resurrection set the soap opera record for the longest span between a character's onscreen death and resurrection. Mahoney went on to play resurrected Victor through his second onscreen death in March 2003, reappearing as a vision for an episode in 2004.

== Storylines ==
=== 1968–76 ===
In the summer of 1968, Victor Lord (Graves) is introduced as the owner of Lord Enterprises founder and publisher of the Philadelphia Main Line newspaper, The Banner, serving the fictional town of Llanview, Pennsylvania. A widower, he is the domineering single father of daughters Victoria or "Viki" (originally Gillian Spencer) and Meredith or "Merrie" (originally Trish Van Devere). The family inhabits Victor's inherited family estate, Llanfair. His wife, Eugenia Randolph Lord, died while giving birth to Meredith and was, ultimately, unable to produce his desired male heir to his estate (a painting of her hangs above the mantle of the Lord library in early episodes). Victor thereby goes about grooming his eldest child, Viki, to assume the role of running the estate by hiring her as an editor for his newspaper.

Victoria desperately seeks her father's approval and gleefully assumes the role of heiress to the family fortune. Victor eventually grows weary of Victoria's admiration for one of his star reporters, working class executive editor Joe Riley (Lee Patterson). In the early years, Victor is also unhappy at the growing relationship of his younger daughter, Meredith, with upwardly-mobile doctor Larry Wolek (Paul Tulley, Jim Storm). He meddles in the personal relationships of his daughters, causing a rift between him and Victoria. In November 1968, unable to reconcile her feelings for Joe and for her father, Victoria develops multiple-personality disorder, manifesting in an alter-ego, "Niki Smith," and begins dating Vinny Wolek (Antony Ponzini).

As Victoria recovers from her first bout with multiple personalities, Victor concedes to the relationships of his white collar daughters to working class gentlemen when he uncovers that he had a long-lost son. Victor embarks on a search for the son he had long yearned for. Viki and Joe first marry in December 1969, and Merrie (Lynn Benesch onward) and Larry (Michael Storm onward) in June 1970. A short time later, Joe apparently dies in a car crash while reporting in California, giving Victor the opportunity to set his widowed daughter up with a suitor more to his liking. With a vacant editor-in-chief position available, Victor replaces Joe with promoted upper-crust writer Steve Burke (Bernie Grant).

In 1971, Victoria (Erika Slezak onward) announces her engagement to Steve, which her father approves of; Victor is, however, unhappy when he discovers his continually frail daughter Meredith is seeking to conceive a child with Larry. Merrie is prescribed bedrest and later gives birth to Victor's first onscreen grandchildren, twins (one which dies a childbirth and the other, a grandson named Daniel). In the summer of 1973, in the midst of Victor's search for his son, Meredith is held hostage in the Llanfair carriage house with brother-in-law Vinny when burglars try to steal Victor's prized art collection. A distressed Victor pleads with the robbers to release Meredith during hostage negotiations with Llanview Police Department Lt. Ed Hall (Al Freeman, Jr.). Meredith is viciously assaulted by the thieves, who are killed by the police, and later dies at Llanview Hospital. Victor is devastated by her death, and he (Graves) leaves Llanview in 1974 in search for his heir-presumptive son.

Victor (Strudwick) treated by Dorian (Pinkerton) after his first stroke, 1974

The hostage crisis of Meredith and Vinny in 1973 saw the introduction of newly minted Dr. Dorian Cramer (originally, Nancy Pinkerton), who Viki dislikes at first sight. Dorian, at first, dates Llanview Hospital co-worker Dr. Mark Toland (Tom Lee Jones), and in the midst of the romance on-the-job in summer 1974. Dorian is suspected of medical malpractice, and all of the hospital board of directors (except for Viki) vote to fire her. Dorian assumes that Viki's was the deciding vote to fire her and vows revenge. When Victor (Strudwick) reappears in December 1974 and suffers a heart attack, and an unemployed Dorian decides to use him to get even with the Lord family.

Dorian becomes Victor's personal physician in 1975, and the two quickly elope in May. Soon afterward, Tony Harris (George Reinholt) arrives in Llanview, and Dorian quickly realizes he is Victor's long-sought son. Tony quickly becomes friends with Victor, and when Tony uncovers a diary from Viki and Meredith's mother, Eugenia, he realizes Victor to be his estranged father, to the chagrin of a greedy Dorian. Dorian connives and succeeds in creating a rift between Victor and his new son. When Tony and Victor learn of Dorian's scheme, Tony first confronts Dorian, who denies having done anything wrong. On April 30, 1976, when Victor begins questioning Dorian, the ensuing argument leads Victor to have a debilitating stroke which leaves him unable to speak or dictate alterations to his will. Determined to keep her Victor from speaking to anyone, Dorian brings him home and succeeds in keeping everyone away from him. Soon, Victor suffers a second stroke which sends him back to the hospital. Despite his attempts to speak to Viki, Victor apparently dies on June 16, 1976, and Dorian inherits half of his wealth.

=== Postmortem ===
In 1985, Viki commences celebrations of the 50th anniversary of her father's newspaper. During preparations for the celebration, Viki's goddaughter, Tina (Andrea Evans), happens upon a hidden door in the Llanfair library, leading to a secret room. While in the room, Tina stumbles upon a letter written by Victor addressed to Viki, telling of his affair and brief marriage with Viki's former college friend Irene Manning Clayton and the siring of his daughter Tina. When Tina divulges the revelations, Viki reverts to alter-ego "Niki Smith" and Tina, for the following year, embarks on a mission to gain what she believes to be rightfully hers as a member of the Lord family. Recovered, Viki later uncovers in 1988 that she had a daughter, Megan Gordon (Jessica Tuck), while under the hypnosis insisted upon by Victor and delivered by her longtime friend and brother-in-law, Larry. Megan dies of lupus in 1992.

Viki engages in an extramarital affair in 1993 with writer Sloan Carpenter (Roy Thinnes), who authors Victor's biography, "Lord of The Banner". While penning the book, Dorian (now, Robin Strasser onward) nervously plots to prevent its publication as Sloan's papers allude to Dorian's complicity in Victor's death, a tale which became a Llanview urban legend in the years following Victor's apparent death. Intrigued by Dorian's intense interest in the book, Viki implores the Llanview Police Department to investigate the circumstances of Victor's death. They comply, leading to the arrest (and conviction, after trial) of Dorian for Victor's murder. When Dorian is sentenced to death by lethal injection, con man David Vickers (Tuc Watkins) arrives in town in 1994, claiming to possess the alleged diary of Viki's late friend and Tina's mother, Irene. Later revealed to be a forgery, the diary claims dead Irene smothered Victor, exonerating Dorian at the eleventh hour. Soon afterward, an actual diary entry from Irene reveals she bore Victor another son, reformed rapist Todd Manning (Roger Howarth).

When Viki learns of the initial forgery, Viki, still loyal to her late father, vows to send Dorian back to jail for Victor's death in 1995. Dorian then divulges the source of Viki's multiple personalities—Victor had long molested his eldest daughter Victoria and her repressed memories of the molestation led to the creation of her initial alter-ego, Niki. Victoria then suffered a recurrence of her multiple personality disorder, subsequently releasing several new personalities, who accost Dorian and hold her hostage in Victor's secret room. Upon recovery, Viki comes to terms with her father's inappropriate behaviors.

Because of the pain she had to endure and dark secrets that were revealed, Viki, who had once worshiped the ground her father walked on and idealized him, now has nothing but contempt, rage, and disgust at Victor's depravity and actions.

Finally in 2003, following the arrival of Viki's long-lost daughter, Natalie (Melissa Archer), an ailing Victor (William Stone Mahoney) resurfaces. It is during this time when Mitch Laurence (Roscoe Born) marries Natalie in a plot spearheaded by Victor to kill his granddaughter and harvest her heart, as he was dying of old age and heart disease. Viki foils Victor and Mitch's plot, saving Natalie from impending death. Victor is again rushed to the hospital. Larry tells Victor's present children, Viki and Todd (Howarth), to say their final goodbyes to their dying father. Victor dies on-screen in March 2003, a month before a shocked Dorian returns to Llanview.

In 2007, during the funeral of Asa Buchanan, Dorian and Viki are trapped together in Asa's wine cellar. The two argue and Dorian tells Viki that she, not Viki, killed Victor. Viki, flabbergasted, reminds Dorian that neither she nor Dorian had killed Victor because he had returned from the dead a few years before. Dorian then plants a seed of doubt in Viki's mind, responding "if that really was him." During the episode first aired on November 26, 2008, Viki visits her father's grave, and the date of death shown is "June 16, 1976", the date of the episode in which Victor originally died. It was never mentioned onscreen whether or not the Victor who appeared in 2003 was an imposter, and the 2003 storyline is not mentioned again in the series, leading to speculation that it was simply retconned out of continuity.

In 2011, it was revealed by a back-from-the dead Irene that the man known as Todd (Trevor St. John) since May 2003 was in fact his twin, Victor Lord, Jr. (St. John), and the real Todd Manning (Howarth) had been held hostage by her since his disappearance in March 2003. Victor, Jr. is later seemingly killed on the episode that first aired August 31, 2011. On the original finale January 13, 2012, however, Victor, Jr. is revealed to be alive and being held captive by Allison Perkins (Barbara Garrick).

==== A seed of doubt ====
During an interview with TV Guide Canada in February 2009, "Dorian Lord" actress Robin Strasser, offered a belated explanation for the recent reversal about Victor's murderer:

I was so happy that [head writer Ron Carlivati] addressed that mythology [in the August 2007 9,999th and 10,000th episodes]. I was very invested in the hopes that Ron was going to dismantle [former writer Michael Malone's] revised back story. This is just my opinion as Robin: I believe Dorian killed Victor. I didn’t play the part then, but I watched those scenes [with Nancy Pinkerton as Dorian], and I thought they were wonderful, in a Little Foxes sort of way. Dorian just didn't give Victor the medicine fast enough. When Michael was head-writing our show, Viki and Dorian had been simmering on the back burner. They didn't quite know what to do with us at that time. At the time, I was doing research on multiple personalities for an acting class, which prompted me to suggest to Erika Slezak that over 90 per cent of DID cases have multiple personalities, not dual alters. Also, DID almost always results from childhood abuse. The next day, we pitched it to Michael Malone. What ensued was that Michael took the story on, but it was also at that point in which Michael had re-wrote history, revealing it was Viki who had killed Victor, not Dorian. That led to my no-good-deed-goes-unpunished moment. Oh, nuts! But I have quietly held the opinion that that decision was revisionist history, and hopefully one day that will be straightened out. I’m sure you have seen the intensity in which I play Dorian protecting and guarding the Cramer women. That's the luggage I bring to the show. You can't erase that kind of history because it's embedded in the tapestry of the show. I always played that Dorian killed Victor because she knew he was a pedophile and suspected him of abusing Viki.

The notion that Dorian is Victor's true murderer is bolstered in the August 16, 2011 episode of One Life to Live. When David Vickers Buchanan mentions that the (albeit forged) entry from Irene Manning's diary cleared Dorian of a murder she did not commit, Dorian comments to herself, "... or so Viki chooses to believe."

== Reception ==
From the outset, the original portrayal of Victor Lord by actor Ernest Graves was received as ruthless and overbearing, playing a role introduced as the powerful center of the fictional town of Llanview, and of the lives of his daughters Victoria and Meredith. For his portrayal of a dying Victor, actor Shepperd Strudwick earned a Daytime Emmy Award nomination for Lead Actor in a Drama Series in 1976.

Leading series actress and onscreen daughter Erika Slezak reflected on Victor's transformation at the 25th anniversary of OLTL in 1993 recalling, "Once, Victor Lord was a paragon of virtue, then producer Paul Rauch said, 'let's turn him into a dirty old man who sleeps with young women and keeps pornography in the basement.'"
