= Jessica Buchanan =

- One Life to Live character
- Bree Williamson as Jessica Buchanan
- Portrayed by: Erin Torpey (1990–2003); Magdalena Andersson (1998); Bree Williamson (2003–12); Deanna DeVestern (young); Nadine Jacobson (2008 flashbacks); (And child actors)
- Duration: 1986–2012
- First appearance: September 23, 1986
- Last appearance: January 13, 2012
- Created by: Peggy O'Shea
- Introduced by: Paul Rauch
- Erin Torpey as Jessica Buchanan
In-universe information
- Other names: Jessica Ann Buchanan; Jessica Eugenia Buchanan; Megan Clark; Tess, Bess, Teen Jess, Wes (alternate personalities); Jessica Santi; Jessica Vega; Jessica Brennan; Jessica Ford; Jessica Wentworth
- Occupation: Reporter at The Sun; Formerly contributing writer for The Banner; Board member at Buchanan Enterprises
- Family: Lord; Buchanan
- Father: Clint Buchanan
- Mother: Victoria Lord
- Stepfather: Sloan Carpenter (1994–95); Ben Davidson (2000–04); Charlie Banks (2009–11)
- Stepmother: Lindsay Rappaport (1998–99); Nora Hanen (2009–10); Kimberly Andrews (2010)
- Sisters: Natalie Buchanan
- Half-brothers: Cord Roberts; Kevin Buchanan; Joey Buchanan; Rex Balsom
- Half-sisters: Megan Gordon
- Spouse: Tico Santi (2004); Antonio Vega (2006–07); Nash Brennan (2007–08); Robert Ford (2011); Cutter Wentworth (2011)
- Sons: Ryder Ford
- Daughters: Megan Buchanan; Bree Brennan; Chloe Brennan
- Grandfathers: Victor Lord; Asa Buchanan
- Grandmothers: Olympia Buchanan; Eugenia Randolph
- Uncles: Tony Lord; Todd Manning; Victor Lord Jr.; Bo Buchanan; Ben Davidson
- Aunts: Meredith Lord; Tina Lord
- Nephews: Duke Buchanan; Shane Morasco; C. J. Roberts; Liam McBain; Zane Buchanan (great-nephew)
- Nieces: Sarah Roberts
- First cousins: Brian Kendall; Daniel Wolek; C. J. Roberts; Sarah Roberts; Starr Manning; Danielle Manning; Jack Manning; Sam Manning; David Vickers Buchanan; Drew Buchanan; Matthew Buchanan

Jessica Eugenia Buchanan (also Santi, Vega, Brennan, Ford and Wentworth) is a fictional character on the ABC soap opera One Life to Live. She is the daughter of Victoria Lord and Clint Buchanan. She is the fraternal twin sister of Natalie Buchanan, and is born on-screen in the episode first-run on September 23, 1986, with the birth year later revised to 1980 and later 1978.

== Casting ==
Child actresses Jessica Azenberg, Janelle and Tamara DeMent, Alex and Brittany Smith, and Eliza Clark played the role since the character's introduction in 1986. Actress Erin Torpey played the role of adolescent to young adult Jessica from September 18, 1990, revising her birth year to 1980. In October 2002, Torpey announced her decision to end her 12-year run as Jessica in order to explore the other areas of her life. Torpey's last appearance as Jessica was on January 15, 2003. Torpey reappeared on the soap opera in 2008 for two episodes for the soap's 40th anniversary, where she played a vision of an older Megan Buchanan, the baby that Jessica miscarried in 1999, during Jessica's mother, Victoria Lord's, visit to Heaven. Torpey later reappeared on the soap for one episode in September 2011 as Erin, a new colleague of Cristian Vega.

Bree Williamson assumed the role on February 5, 2003, and remained until the series finale on January 13, 2012. Williamson garnered three consecutive Daytime Emmy Award nominations in 2009, 2010, and 2011 in the category of Outstanding Supporting Actress for the role. Williamson also announced prior to the series' cancellation that she would not be joining the original Prospect Park venture of the series online; instead relocating her family to California.

== Development ==
The 1986 Mitch Laurence storyline which culminated with new-born Jessica's kidnapping occurred during a season in which One Life to Live rose from #4 to #3 in the Nielsen ratings.

When Gary Tomlin joined the show as Executive Producer in January 2001, his familiarity with the series and its characters — from his stint as director from 1992 to 1995 — "manifested itself in ... the utilization of the show's rich history." At the time, Tomlin explained how then-Head Writers Christopher Whitesell and Lorraine Broderick had thought, "OK, where can we do something where we do bring back that history but also explore something that's going to affect the future of this show?" Barbara Garrick was brought back in 2001 as kidnapper Allison Perkins, with Tomlin noting that her return "invigorates the Viki storyline ... [Allison] kidnapped Jessica, so there's a history there." Soap Opera Weekly called what followed "The Mother Of All Reveals," a storyline in which the series exploited a loophole in its continuity and created a secret history that would "resonate for months and years." The 2001 reveal that the now-teenage Jessica had actually been switched with another baby as an infant by Allison in 1986 — and so was not Clint and Viki's daughter — "was about as big as they come."

The series garnered attention in 2007 for raising awareness for Hepatitis C by having Jessica diagnosed with the disease.

== Storylines ==
The daughter of Victoria Lord and Clint Buchanan, Jessica is born on September 23, 1986 and is soon kidnapped by Allison Perkins on instructions from Viki's nemesis, Mitch Laurence. Putting on a red wig and flashy dress to look like Viki's former alternate personality, Niki Smith, Allison sneaks into Llanfair and takes Jessica while Viki is asleep. As the search for Jessica commences, Viki denies the suggestion that she had stolen the child as Niki. Maria Roberts had already been plotting to separate Viki and Clint and take him for herself; Maria discovers Allison's involvement and manipulates the situation further so that Clint begins to believe that Niki is the kidnapper after all. When Maria is later sure that she has ruined Clint and Viki's marriage, she persuades Allison to return Jessica. Allison does, but is subsequently hit by a car and falls into a coma before she can tell anyone about Maria's scheming.

In 1994, an unhappy Jessica begins smoking and rebelling due to her parents' divorce. Marty Saybrooke catches her attempting to shoplift and tries to support her, telling Jessica’s parents that they should be worried about her unhappiness. In early 1995, Jessica meets Cristian Vega, and they are instantly attracted to each other. Jessica's father, Clint, and Cristian's mother, Carlotta, initially object to the relationship, forcing the teens to see each other in secret. The issues are eventually worked out. In 1998, Jessica later has a one-night stand with Will Rappaport and becomes pregnant. Cristian forgives her and the two decide to get married. In 1999, Dorian Lord accidentally hits Jessica with her car, and the baby (later named Megan) is stillborn. The miscarriage pushes Jessica and Cristian apart and brings her closer to Will, but neither relationship survives.

Natalie Balsom appears in 2001, stirring up trouble and soon making the startling claim that she is in fact the biological daughter of Jessica's parents, Clint and Viki. After this is confirmed by a DNA test, it is at first believed that when Allison Perkins had kidnapped the Buchanan baby in 1986, another child had been returned and had grown up to be Jessica. Jessica begins a tenuous relationship with Natalie's mother, Roxy Balsom, whom Jessica believes to be her own biological mother, and with Roxy's biological son, Rex. But when a DNA test on Jessica proves that she is also Viki's daughter, the real story comes out. It is ultimately revealed that Mitch Laurence had secretly raped a drugged Viki around the same time she conceived a child with Clint. Viki had unknowingly become pregnant with fraternal twins, one fathered by Clint (Natalie) and the other fathered by Mitch (Jessica). Viki's obstetrician, Walter Balsom, who had been one of religious leader Mitch's disciples, had taken Mitch's daughter during delivery, and Viki had never known she had given birth to more than one child. Mitch, however, had wanted his daughter to grow up loved by Viki in the lap of luxury, and had sent Allison to kidnap Clint's child. They had replaced her with Mitch's daughter (who would become Jessica), and had given Clint's daughter (who would become Natalie) to Dr. Balsom and his wife, Roxy.

In 2003, Jessica falls in love with Cristian's brother, Llanview Police Detective Antonio Vega. During the summer, a returned-from-the-dead Mitch is desperate for his daughter to love him. When his efforts are continually rebuffed, he finally kidnaps Jessica and keeps her drugged at his estate. Antonio and Police Commissioner Bo Buchanan find Jessica; a short while later, Mitch is found dead on the docks. Ultimately Jessica remembers hitting Mitch in the head with a pipe to save her uncle, Todd Manning, who had been posing as Mitch's brother, Walker Laurence. Due to the multiple suspects and conflicting evidence surrounding the case, Bo drops the investigation.

Jessica and Antonio's deepening relationship is complicated by the return of Antonio's ex, Keri Reynolds, and daughter Jamie, who had been presumed dead in a plane crash. When Keri is later killed, Antonio is accused; Jessica stands by him, and he is ultimately exonerated. In the summer of 2004, Jessica and Antonio visit Puerto Rico as part of his ongoing investigation of the Santi crime family. Jessica comes upon a man left for dead in the Santi vault, Tico Santi, son of deceased crime lord Manuel, tortured by his father's enemies who are looking for Manuel's missing fortune. They take a grateful Tico back to Llanview, but the Santi heir takes a growing interest in Jessica and begins driving a wedge between her and Antonio.

It is revealed that Antonio's mother, Carlotta Vega, is Manuel's sister, and soon Antonio is shocked to discover that he is in fact Manuel's eldest son, thought killed as a baby. Carlotta relates how she and her husband, Diego, adopted Antonio to protect him from his father's enemies. Antonio is furious with Carlotta over the deception, and his obsession with the "Santi case" leads Jessica to return his engagement ring to him. Antonio becomes involved with Tico's adopted sister Sonia Toledo as Jessica suddenly marries Tico. Antonio forgives Carlotta, and in November discovers that a presumed-dead Cristian is still alive but possessing no memories of his former life. It is revealed that Tico is actually "El Tiburon," the mysterious drug lord who has resurrected the Santi criminal empire. Responsible for Cristian's disappearance, Tico has programmed Cristian to kill Antonio; the attempt fails as the trauma of trying to kill his own brother brings Cristian's memories flooding back. Antonio shoots Tico; at the hospital, an injured Jessica sees someone pull the plug on Tico's life support, but cannot remember whom. It is revealed that Cristian had killed Tico; he is sent to prison in 2005, but his sentence is later overturned.

Following Tico's death, Jessica begins to experience blackouts and losses of time. It is soon revealed that, like her mother, Jessica has dissociative identity disorder. Jessica is once again romantically involved with Antonio in 2005, but her wild alter ego, Tess, parties and meets other men. Antonio is engaged in a custody battle with R.J. over Jamie, and the stability of his relationship with Jessica is an important factor. Jessica discovers her condition, and soon realizes that she is a danger to not only the case, but Jamie's safety and well-being. She quietly checks herself into St. Ann's sanitarium to get treatment to integrate her personalities, but soon Tess emerges and plots to escape. Fellow patient Addie Cramer shows Tess some of her treasured belongings, including the report card of her granddaughter, Starr Manning, the daughter of Jessica's uncle Todd and Addie's daughter Blair. Tess uses Todd's signature from the card to get herself released, but Todd, already suspicious of Jessica's behavior, figures out that Jessica is under the influence of an alternate personality and drags her to Llanfair to tell Viki. Not wanting to be integrated out of existence, Tess incites a huge argument with Todd that causes Viki to have a heart attack. She survives, but Tess escapes to New York City.

Tess steals a car belonging to Nash Brennan. Though frustrated by her attitude and troublemaking, Nash finds himself attracted to her. He saves Tess from a would-be rapist and, realizing she has nowhere to go but will not admit it, takes her into his home. The icy Tess warms to Nash, telling him that the "Jessica" she blames for ruining her life is her dead twin sister. Todd tracks Tess down but is thrown off the trail by a protective Nash. Tess begins falling for Nash, but Jessica briefly reemerges and flees back to Llanview. Nash follows, and whisks Tess off to his Napa Valley winery. During the few instances she is in control, Jessica manages to send Antonio clues to her whereabouts. He finds her and takes her back to Llanview. Nash follows, he and Viki finding out about Jessica's condition in October 2005. Jessica is soon revealed to be pregnant.

In love with conflicting parts of the same woman, Antonio and Nash are at odds. Jessica is getting treatment, but Tess is still not under control. Clint takes a liking to Nash, who promises not to run off with Tess and is only concerned with her well-being. In February 2006, Clint and Viki discover the cause of Jessica's mental illness: she had been molested as a child. Viki is devastated, as her own alternate personality, Niki Smith, had been around at the time and had left Jessica unattended. On April 28, 2006, Tess is in control when Jessica gives birth to her daughter, named Brennan Buchanan by Tess and later nicknamed "Bree" by Jessica and Antonio. In June 2006, a paternity test establishes that Nash is Bree's father. With Jessica now in control, Nash decides that it is best for Jessica and Antonio to raise her. In August, Jessica is able to fully integrate the Tess personality into her own, and Jessica and Antonio become engaged. Nash and Antonio form an unlikely friendship as Jessica adjusts to the aspects of Tess now present in her own personality. Jessica marries Antonio in November 2006.

Soon after the marriage in 2007, Jessica begins to develop feelings for Nash, who has let go of his love for Tess but finds himself also falling for Jessica. They fight the attraction; Jessica realizes she is in love with Nash, but wants to be loyal to Antonio. She agrees to adopt Jamie and tells Nash that she does not love him. Nash is on his way out of town as a guilty Jessica flees the adoption hearing. They both find themselves at the quarry, finally giving into temptation and making love. In May 2007, Jessica is about to tell Antonio that she wants to be with Nash when she collapses. She is diagnosed with Hepatitis C, presumably a result of Tess' wild lifestyle. It is also determined that as a result, Jessica now has a related form of liver cancer and needs a transplant. As the search for a suitable donor begins, Jessica tells Antonio about her feelings for Nash; furious and devastated, he leaves town with Jamie. Antonio turns out to be a match, but not even Carlotta knows where he is. Nash manages to track Antonio down and convinces him to return to save Jessica. Jessica and Antonio divorce in July 2007, but she collapses in the courthouse as her body rejects the transplanted liver. David Vickers is determined to be a suitable liver donor; he makes a deal with Clint to donate in exchange for $10 million. A desperate Clint agrees to the deal as Nash proposes to Jessica, and they marry in her hospital room on July 12, 2007. Jessica pulls through, and a guilty David returns Clint's money as a goodwill gesture to Viki.

Recently released from prison, Jared Banks arrives in Llanview in August 2007 with a particular interest in the Buchanan family. He manipulates Natalie into giving him a job at Buchanan Enterprises, swindles Nash at a game of poker, and buys Antonio's shares of Nash's vineyard. It is revealed that Jared shares a secret past with Tess, who had been responsible for sending him to prison. Jared wants revenge on Jessica, not believing that "Tess" had ever existed. His attraction to Natalie and understanding of Jessica's former mental illness soften him toward Jessica, but his ambition prompts him to step into the role of Asa Buchanan's long-lost son when the opportunity arises. Wanting to keep the identity of the real Buchanan heir, David Vickers, a secret to protect the family, Asa's butler Nigel goes along with Jared's plan. Suspicious of Jared, Jessica pretends to be Tess to hopefully gain his confidence. He counters by notifying the doctors at St. Ann's, who take Jessica into custody under her own orders established should Tess ever return.

At St. Ann's, Jessica comes face to face with Allison Perkins, who claims to know a huge secret about Jessica's family. Her interest piqued, Jessica eventually makes a deal with Allison: Jessica will help her escape from St. Ann's in exchange for what she knows. Jessica is released, but she and Natalie smuggle Allison out, planning to return her once they have heard her tale. Once free, Allison manages to elude them, but not before collecting a mysterious package from the Lord family mausoleum where Viki's father is buried. Allison later confronts Jessica with a gun but Jared steps in to save her. Allison lets herself fall from the Palace Hotel balcony, preferring to die with her secret rather than return to St. Ann's. She survives, but is left comatose and in critical condition.

In the spring of 2008, Nash becomes involved with mysterious investors purportedly interested in his winery. Discovering that they instead intend to take his land for commercial development, Nash accepts an offer from Jared to buy the winery via Buchanan Enterprises. But when Jared is publicly outed at the Palace Hotel as a fraud and the deal is rendered void, an enraged Nash confronts both Jared and Natalie, who had recently discovered Jared's deception and had kept the secret. In the subsequent scuffle, Jared shoves Nash, who accidentally tumbles over a railing and falls through a skylight to the floor a few stories below. Nash is rushed to the hospital, but his internal injuries are too severe for surgery, and Jessica is shocked to be told that he will soon die. Jessica stays by Nash's side, telling him that she is pregnant again and promising that both Bree and their new child will never forget him. Kissing her one last time, Nash dies in Jessica's arms on June 5, 2008.

Jessica explodes at Natalie and Jared when they appear at Nash's funeral, calling them murderers and blaming them for Nash's death. Overwhelmed by painful memories and fallen into a state of depression, Jessica relapses, and Tess reemerges, on June 27, 2008. Seeking revenge on Jared and Natalie, Tess makes multiple attempts to kill them, but a new plan soon comes to mind. She convinces Viki to go through with a planned trip out-of-town and, taking a cue from Viki's gatekeeper personality, Jean Randolph, Tess commissions a secret room to be built in Llanfair's basement, including soundproofed walls and a closed-circuit television feed. Though Todd and Jessica's aunt, Tina Lord, realize that Tess has returned, Tess blackmails them both to guarantee their silence, and enlists their reluctant collusion in her crimes. After drugging Natalie, Tess imprisons her in the secret room. Trapped and forced to watch the goings-on in Llanfair via hidden cameras, Natalie is horrified as Tess begins her campaign to convince Jared that Natalie has left him and Llanview, keeping them separated forever. A "Dear John" letter and Tess' lies fail to convince Jared that Natalie has truly left him, and he soon suspects that Tess is in control. He discovers Natalie's prison, but is soon trapped inside with her. Tess realizes her plan is unraveling as Viki returns and has her own suspicions.

A pregnant Tess sets a bomb to take care of Jared and Natalie once and for all, but goes into premature labor and flees to Nash and Jessica's abandoned vineyard cottage. Alone and afraid, Tess conjures up a hallucination of Niki Smith, the only "mother" Tess has ever known. Niki chastises Tess for her evil deeds and urges her to repent, telling Tess that she is simply transferring her rage at Niki's own negligence during Jessica's childhood onto Jared and Natalie, and pushes her to make things right and save the people at Llanfair. Tess agrees to go back and deactivate the bomb, but is struck by another wave of contractions before she can. With Niki's help, Tess delivers a severely premature baby girl on November 6, 2008; the baby is stillborn.

Jared and Natalie are saved. The trauma of the baby's death triggers a second alter named Bess to emerge in Jessica. Just as Jessica's psyche had modelled Tess after Viki's extroverted Niki, Bess is a gatekeeper personality modeled after Viki's Jean Randolph, who is obsessed with control, order, and above all, protection of the core personality. Realizing that neither Jessica nor Tess can handle the child's death, Bess goes to Llanview Hospital and switches Jessica's stillborn daughter with the newborn daughter of her cousin, Starr. With everyone, including Jessica and Tess, believing that Starr's baby, Hope, had died and that Jessica's daughter Chloe is alive, Jessica checks herself into St. Ann's for treatment. The trauma unresolved, Tess suspects that something is amiss with Chloe, but she is suppressed by Bess.

Jessica befriends fellow patient Brody Lovett, who sees Jessica's illness first-hand as Tess tries to manipulate him into aiding her escape. Bess tells Tess that her obsession with getting revenge against Jared and Natalie, and subsequent failure to seek any prenatal treatment, caused her baby's death. Seeking to hide the secret once and for all, Bess distracts Jessica with the realization that she allowed Tess to emerge to punish Natalie and Jared, and convinces Tess to stay quiet and pretend that all of Jessica's personalities are integrated. Months later, Jared and Natalie discover that the babies were switched, but decide to keep the secret to preserve Jessica's fragile sanity. In May 2009, Jessica begins to remember more about the night she gave birth. With everyone around her now aware of the truth and waiting for Jessica's psychologist to help them break the news to her, Bess emerges and runs off with the baby, taking Chloe to Nash's parents' house far away. Brody manages to track Bess down and corner her, but the Brennans initially distrust him and knock him out. This causes Jessica to emerge for a few moments before Bess regains control. Bess locks herself and Chloe in an upstairs bedroom. Viki, disguised as her alter Jean Randolph, manages to get Bess to rethink the circumstances and let Jessica back out.

On June 3, 2009, Jessica tearfully breaks down and admits to her mother that she remembers what happened and she knows her baby is dead. On June 5, 2009, Jessica tells Bree about Chloe/Hope and gives her to Todd and Blair to give to Cole and Starr. She then goes up to the nursery where she collapses on the floor and sobs, Brody finds her and they reunite. Jessica's baby is re-buried as Chloe Victoria Brennan on June 17, 2009.

Later in 2009, Jessica is unnerved by someone making it appear as though the now deceased Nash is alive and stalking her. Jared appears responsible until Mitch reappears to a stunned Jessica, Natalie, and Jared in California on November 9, 2009. Meanwhile, Roxy's son, Rex Balsom, is revealed to be Mitch's biological child as well. Mitch later kidnaps Jessica as part of his plan to kidnap Rex's soon-to-be-born baby with Stacy Morasco and have Jessica raises the child in captivity. After subjecting Jessica to electroshock therapy to remove any resistance and discovering that Stacy's child is not Rex's, Mitch intends to rape Jessica to father his own heir. Brody, Charlie Banks, and Dorian arrive to save Jessica, who is accidentally shot.

Jessica survives surgery, but mentally regresses herself into an alter known as Teen Jess in order to forget about the rape. This alter is Jessica's personality from high school. In her mind, Jessica is still 17 and in love with Cristian. She pursues him with no luck as she pushes a heartbroken Brody away. Teen Jess disappears, and Jessica's memories return on May 21, 2010, as she is being seduced by Cristian’s womanizing roommate, Robert Ford. She reunites with Brody, not knowing that he and Natalie had slept together the night before as well.

After reuniting with Brody, Jessica soon discovers that she is pregnant. Brody is ecstatic, but Jessica is unsure if he or Ford is the father. On July 29, 2010 Brody proposes and she accepts. Brody is later furious to discover he may not be the baby's father, but he and Jessica reconcile. A paternity test declares Brody the father, but it is clear that Clint may have tampered with the results.

On the night of what could have been John and Natalie's wedding, Jessica goes into labor. Brody and John take Jessica to the hospital. With her baby being premature, she can either have an emergency C-section with the chance of the baby not surviving, or wait a while until the baby is ready but possibly have a hysterectomy or die from childbirth. Jessica decides to have the C-section and delivers a healthy baby boy with no complications. They later name the child Ryder Asa Lovett, and ask Joey Buchanan and Kelly Cramer to be his godparents.

Jessica and Brody plan to get married and convince John and Natalie to have a double wedding with them. On the day of the wedding, Vimal arrives and confesses to changing her paternity test for Clint to say that Brody is the father of Ryder. Brody storms out of the room and Jessica follows him. She tries to get Brody to forgive her, and he spills to Jessica about him and Natalie. Natalie reveals to Brody and Jessica that Liam's father is Brody. Jessica tears the room apart and Natalie tells Jessica that she is her sister and that she loves her. Jessica tells Natalie she will never be her sister. Jessica is emotionally torn; Tess returns and has a run in with Robert Ford, who was shocked that Jessica said her name was Tess and he'd already found out about Ryder being his. Tess tells Ford her plan to elope with him in order for him to see Ryder. Ford and Tess elope to Vegas, while Langston and Brody follow them in order to stop them.

Brody and Langston are unsuccessful and Tess and Ford return to Llanview married. Viki and Clint want to send Tess to St. Ann’s for treatment, but Ford does not let them insisting that Tess is the only person who will let him be with Ryder. Viki and Clint enter a custody battle over Ryder with Tess and Ford. Tess moves in with Ford and begins a flirtation with Cutter Wentworth which results in Jessica momentarily regaining control.

Jessica goes to get her son and tells Ford that she will never let him see Ryder. This prompts Ford to cause Tess to re-emerge. Tess soon continues to see Cutter and she soon discovers that he and Aubrey Wentworth are con-artists who are scamming the Buchanans and she decides to join them for the money. Tess discovers that Viki's husband, Charlie Banks, is having an affair with Echo DiSavoy. Tess reveals Charlie's affair, assuring Ford that it will help them in their custody case. She goes to Viki's house to convince her to drop the custody battle. As she taunts Viki, Niki Smith emerges. Tess gets Niki to try and drop the lawsuit, but in court, Viki re-emerges. Tess and Ford lose custody of Ryder, but so does Viki. The judge decides to put Ryder in foster care, when Aubrey, who had recently married Joey, steps up and says she and Joey will take care of Ryder. Tess starts to dispute this, intending to expose Cutter and Aubrey's affair. However, Aubrey gets her to back down when she reminds her that she won't get her cut. The judge agrees to this, granting them temporary custody of Ryder.

Ford is devastated that he's lost his son, and furious that Tess didn't say what she knew about Aubrey and Joey. Ford tells her to say what she knows about Joey and Aubrey, but she still refuses. Joey and Aubrey eventually come over to get Ryder, and Ford makes them a deal: he'll commit Tess to St. Ann's if they give him his son back. Furious, Tess knocks out Ford and leaves.

On May 4, 2011, Tess runs into Cutter again and they later decided to get married so they could continue their plot to steal the Buchanans’ money. Meanwhile, Jessica is struggling with Bess and tries to take control back from Tess. On May 11, 2011, Brody and Cutter argue with each other over Cutter's relationship with Jessica and Tess, which causes her to split into a male alter, Wes. Wes is based on Brody's deceased fellow Navy SEAL friend, Wes Granger, who is meant to push all men away from Jessica. Wes leaves Cutter's motel room and arrives at Capricorn, where he attempts to flirt with Aubrey and Rama. Cutter lures Wes back to the motel and kisses him, attempting to get Tess back. Instead, Jessica returns, but Cutter, still trying to get Tess back, brings Wes back, who punches him and flees.

Later, Wes encounters a bewildered Marty Saybrooke, who has kidnapped Liam. Wes hides Marty from Brody and John, and somehow, Tess re-emerges, with no memory of what has happened. Brody takes Tess into custody, determined to bring Wes back and find out what he knows about Liam's kidnapping. However, Tess retreats and Bess temporarily returns, saying that Wes has locked away all his secrets, and she only managed to get one name: Todd Manning. Brody asks what it means and Bess says that she doesn't know. Cutter demands that Bess brings Tess back, but Bess scoffs at him and asks what Tess even sees in him. Brody pleads with Bess to bring Jessica back, but Bess says that Jessica is still healing and will return eventually. Bess retreats from the scene and Tess returns, so Brody is forced to let her go. Cutter tells Tess he is taking her away from Llanview, but he plans to commit her to St. Ann’s so Jessica can come home in exchange for a piece of the Buchanan fortune and the Buchanan mansion. Later, Ford sneaks into St. Ann’s to set Tess free, but is caught and thrown out. Bess confronts Tess and tells her that it is time to set Jessica free again, but Tess refuses. Ford sneaks in again, this time disguised as a nun and professes his love to Tess, and the two proceed to make love. However, inside Tess's head, Jessica manages to overtake all her alters and appears to integrate herself. Jessica, having finally incorporated all of her personalities back within herself, rushes home to find Brody and Natalie in bed.

Jessica argues with Brody and Natalie, saying they betrayed her a second time. Brody fights back, saying that she was hiding behind Tess and used Wes to hurt him. Jessica denies any intention of hurting anyone, and Brody says that's because no one expects Jessica to do any of those things. Angrier than ever, Jessica ends her relationship with Brody and vows revenge on him and Natalie, saying that she does not need Tess to deal with them later.

Viki advises Jessica not to give up on Brody. Jessica calls him and they both apologize for the argument. Jessica says that she got over the fact that Brody and Natalie slept together and had a child, but asked if the second time was an accident too. Brody doesn't answer which makes Jessica think that it was not an accident. Later, Natalie tells Jessica that she and Brody are going to have a life together. Outraged and hurt, Jessica yells at Natalie which makes Natalie say that the thing she liked about Tess is that she took responsibility for her actions and had no problem showing her dislike for her. Jessica punches Natalie.

Jessica and Natalie have another fight and Jessica suggest that she and Brody live together because she doesn't want to see either of them. Brody then agrees which leaves Jessica and Natalie shocked. Ford comforts Jessica and they go to the park with the children for a family date. Ford later comments to James how this new Jessica seems to act more like Tess, dubbing her New Jessica.

On September 28, 2011, Natalie and Jessica bump into each other in Angel Square. Jessica acknowledges that she'd heard about Natalie's engagement to Brody. Natalie is apologetic and states that she just wants to make things right between the two of them. Jessica wonders how things could be okay after Natalie had stolen Jessica's fiancé. Natalie explains that Brody had waited for Jessica for months. She believes that Natalie accepted Brody as a consolation prize after John had rejected her twice. Jessica accuses Natalie of successfully destroying the family just as she'd set out to do when she'd first arrived in Llanview. The argument continues to escalate. Jessica states that she wishes they'd never found out about Natalie being a Buchanan. Natalie reminds Jessica that she was actually more family than Jessica: Natalie's real father is Clint, while Jessica's father was Mitch Laurence. "Your father is a deranged psycho killer that killed my husband when you didn't finish the job yourself," Natalie accused. Jessica states that she wasn’t responsible for the fact that Mitch killed many people. Natalie adds that she had forgiven Jessica, but Jessica had been unable to return the favor. "Brody is lucky to be rid of you," Natalie growls. "You are Mitch Laurence's psycho daughter and always will be." The argument turns physical. Brody finds Jessica and Natalie fighting, pulls them apart, and he carries Natalie from the scene as Jessica screams after them.

In January 2012, Allison Perkins shows up at Llanfair and reveals that both Natalie and Jessica are biologically Clint's. Allison had altered the paternity results and lied to Mitch Laurence that Jessica was his. Clint refuses to believe this and says to Viki, "Do you really believe this lunatic?" Allison shoots Viki and flees. Clint reaches for the phone but collapses beside Viki. Meanwhile, Jessica is at the hospital with Ford. While struggling for a gun, Mitch had shot at a chandelier which fell on Ford, leaving him unconscious and severely injured. Jessica is then devastated when the doctor reveals that Ford died from his injuries.

In the series finale, Jessica and Natalie fully reconcile, as it is revealed through a DNA test that Jessica is indeed Clint's daughter. Following this, Brody shows up at Llanfair. He apologizes for everything that happened between them, as does Jessica.

== Alternate personalities ==
- Tess - Tess is the manifestation of Jessica's anger at her abuse and the equivalent of Viki's alter, Niki Smith.
- Bess - Bess is the cool, calm, controlled gatekeeper alter and the equivalent of Viki's alter, Jean Randolph.
- Teen Jess - Teen Jess is the teenage personality of Jessica from when she was in high school, who first emerged to help Jessica cope with the forced electroshock therapy and attempted rape at the hands of Mitch Laurence.
- Wes - Wes is a male alter inspired by Jessica's boyfriend Brody's deceased Navy SEAL friend Wes Granger. The alter is the manifestation of her desire to push all of her male love interests away from her life.

== See also ==
- Nash Brennan and Jessica Buchanan
