= Ben Davidson (One Life to Live) =

- One Life to Live character
- Portrayed by: Mark Derwin
- Duration: 1999–2002; 2004; 2008
- First appearance: February 9, 1999
- Last appearance: July 22, 2008
- Created by: Jill Farren Phelps
- Introduced by: Jill Farren Phelps
In-universe information
- Other names: Benjamin Davidson
- Occupation: Owner of Crossroads Bar; Doctor at Llanview Hospital; Former Bartender at Crossroads Bar
- Family: Buchanan
- Parents: Asa Buchanan; Renée Divine
- Adoptive parents: Sam Davidson; Jane Rappaport
- Brothers: Sam Rappaport (adoptive)
- Sisters: Grace Davidson (adoptive)
- Half-brothers: Clint Buchanan; Bo Buchanan
- Spouse: Skye Chandler (1998–99); Victoria Lord (2000–04)
- Grandfathers: Matthew Rappaport (adoptive)
- Aunts and uncles: Pike Buchanan; Jeannie Buchanan
- Nieces and nephews: Cord Roberts; Kevin Buchanan (adoptive); Joey Buchanan (adoptive); Jessica Buchanan; Natalie Buchanan; Rex Balsom; David Vickers; Drew Buchanan; Matthew Buchanan; Will Rappaport (adoptive); Jennifer Rappaport (adoptive)
- First cousins: Austin Buchanan; Rafe Garretson

Ben Davidson is a fictional character on the American soap opera One Life to Live. He was portrayed by actor Mark Derwin from February 1999 to August 2002, and briefly in February 2004 and July 2008. Ben is best remembered as the sixth husband of town heroine Victoria Lord, who carried the name "Victoria Lord Davidson" for nine years.

== Character and storylines ==
Ben arrives in Llanview, Pennsylvania, in 1999 with a tumultuous past and takes a job as a bartender at Crossroads. It is here that he meets Victoria "Viki" Lord Carpenter. The two become closer, and when Ben's past with the mob catches up with him and he is shot; Viki comes to his rescue. They marry on November 13, 2000.

Ben has a long-standing feud with Asa Buchanan, whom he would later learn is his father. Asa has a heart attack during one of these confrontations and Ben is content to let him die, until Max Holden convinces him to save Asa's life. Eventually, after many battles, Asa learns to accept Ben as his son and they get along with one another. Ben's mother Renee Divine Buchanan is initially hurt by Ben's lies but becomes close to Ben.

In 2002, Ben is pushed out of a second story window at Llanfair by Viki's alter ego, Niki Smith (Viki had been suffering from a recurrence of her dissociative identity disorder). Viki's daughter Natalie Buchanan is initially blamed for pushing him, until Ben's amnesia clears and he remembers that Niki had pushed him. He recovers from the fall; however, shortly after he is accidentally shot by Antonio Vega, who is trying to save Viki from Allison Perkins (who had kidnapped her). The incident leaves Ben comatose. Over time, Viki decides to move on with her life, and begins dating Pennsylvania Governor Harrison Brooks. After a falling out with Brooks, Viki realizes that Ben is the only true love of her life.

In 2004, Viki spends Valentine's Day next to Ben's bed. Viki is ecstatic whenever Ben briefly awakes. Ben tells Viki that he loves her, and after the two share favorite memories, Viki is heartbroken whenever Ben falls back into his coma. Shortly after, Viki learns of the declining condition of her heart, and she will die without a transplant. After Viki is hospitalized, the search for a compatible heart begins. A heart is found but is contaminated by Llanview Hospital Chief of Staff Dr. Long, who is selling organs on the black market. However, Ben's condition declines, and he dies in May 2004. Though reluctant at first, Viki accepts Ben's heart and brother-in-law Dr. Larry Wolek performs her surgery.

In July 2008, Viki is involved in a car accident with Dorian Lord and dies; she visits Heaven, where she is reunited with deceased loved ones, including Ben. After Ben advises Viki to give love another chance and forgive Charlie Banks, Viki decides to return to her loved ones. Dorian revives Viki with a shot of adrenaline, and Viki later makes a complete recovery in the hospital.
