= Allison Perkins =

- One Life to Live character
- Barbara Garrick as Allison Perkins
- Portrayed by: Barbara Garrick
- Duration: 1986–87; 2001–03; 2008; 2010; 2012–13
- First appearance: August 4, 1986
- Last appearance: August 19, 2013
- Created by: Peggy O'Shea
- Introduced by: Paul Rauch; Gary Tomlin (2001); Frank Valentini (2008); Jennifer Pepperman (2013)
In-universe information
- Occupation: Hospital volunteer
- Parents: Warden Perkins; Ruth Perkins
- Siblings: Leah Joplin; Carl Peterson
- Nephews: Schuyler Joplin (adoptive)

Allison Perkins is a fictional character on the American soap opera One Life to Live.

Barbara Garrick originated the role from 1986 to 1987, returning from August 15, 2001 to August 27, 2002 and then making brief appearances from October 24 to October 28, 2002 and January 10 to January 31, 2003. Garrick once again returned to the role from January 25, 2008 to March 3, 2008. She reappeared on February 26, 2010, until April 13, 2010. She escaped Statesville and returned to Llanview during the blackout on January 5, 2012, and remained until the broadcast finale January 13, 2012. Under secrecy, Garrick returned for the first-season finale of Prospect Park's version of One Life to Live on August 19, 2013.

== Development ==
The character of Allison became a key player in the 1986 Mitch Laurence storyline during a season in which the series rose from No. 4 to No. 3 in the Nielsen ratings. Villain Laurence wreaks havoc in fictional Llanview and seeks to exact his revenge on long-running One Life to Live heroine Viki Lord Buchanan; his death does not end his reign of terror, as disciple Allison kidnaps Viki's newborn daughter Jessica but ultimately returns her.

Garrick returned as Allison in 2001 for what Soap Opera Weekly called "The Mother Of All Reveals," a storyline in which the series exploited a loophole in its continuity and created a secret history that would "resonate for months and years." The reveal that teenage Jessica had actually been switched with another baby by Allison in 1986 – and so was not the daughter of Viki and husband Clint Buchanan – "was about as big as they come."

When Gary Tomlin became Executive Producer of One Life to Live in January 2001, his familiarity with the series and its characters – from his stint as director from 1992 to 1995 – "manifested itself in ... the utilization of the show's rich history." At the time he noted that the return of Allison Perkins "invigorates the Viki storyline, and [Allison] kidnapped Jessica, so there's a history there." Tomlin explained how then-Head Writers Christopher Whitesell and Lorraine Broderick had thought, "OK, where can we do something where we do bring back that history but also explore something that's going to affect the future of this show?" He added that One Life to Live had been "so fortunate to get Barbara Garrick, who played the role originally, because we used those flashbacks from 13, 14 years ago. It's a treat for the audience that has invested in the show for that long, and the audience that doesn't know the story and gets to see what happened and realize, 'Oh my god, this is real. This isn't something they're making up.'"

== Storylines ==
=== 1986–87 ===
While a volunteer at Llanview Hospital in 1986, shy Allison Perkins takes an interest in young intern Dr. Dan Wolek, son of Dr. Larry Wolek and his deceased wife Meredith Lord. The two date, but nothing comes of it.

The sheltered daughter of the warden of Stateville Prison, Allison soon falls under the spell of charismatic Mitch Laurence, who is incarcerated for the murder of Harry O'Neill. Pretending that he has "found God," evil Mitch is released from prison and returns to Llanview as an evangelist. Still up to his old tricks, Mitch assembles his own commune at the Waterside Inn, coercing and drugging young women into being his disciples. Allison, Viki Buchanan's niece Mari Lynn Dennison and even Harry O'Neill's daughter Joy are seduced into Mitch's cult. Enacting his vendetta against Viki, whom he blames for the failure of his past schemes, Mitch programs Allison to do his bidding. A pregnant Viki visits the commune, and Allison drugs her; on the way home, Viki has an accident and goes into premature labor. Mitch is killed by Dorian Lord as he tries to rape her drugged daughter Cassie; Viki gives birth to baby Jessica on September 23, 1986.

Disguised as Niki Smith, Allison kidnaps Jessica (1986)

Compelled by Mitch's brainwashing, Allison puts his final plan into action. Putting on a red wig and flashy dress to look like Viki's former alternate personality Niki Smith, Allison sneaks into Viki's mansion, Llanfair, and kidnaps Jessica while Viki is asleep. Allison leaves the baby in the care of her mother Ruth in New Jersey, the older woman unaware of the child's origins. As the search for Jessica commences, Viki denies the suggestion that she had stolen the child as Niki. Maria Roberts, the old flame of Viki's husband Clint Buchanan, had already been plotting to separate Viki and Clint and take him for herself; Maria discovers Allison's involvement, and manipulates the situation further so that Clint begins to believe that Niki is the kidnapper after all. When Maria is later sure she has ruined Clint and Viki's marriage, she persuades Allison to return Jessica. Allison does, but is subsequently hit by a car and falls into a coma before she can tell anyone about Maria's scheming.

=== 2001–03 ===
In 2001, Allison reappears in Llanview at St. Ann's mental institution. Sane and remorseful, Allison tells her new psychologist, Dr. Rae Cummings, that she is desperate for Viki's forgiveness. A close friend of Viki's, Rae urges her to visit Allison; Viki's husband Ben Davidson, however, is suspicious and recommends against it. A compassionate Viki meets with and forgives a grateful Allison. But Ben soon hears Allison say "Viki forgave me. It's all set." to someone on the phone; he decides to infiltrate St. Ann's, posing as mental patient "Dave" to gain Allison's confidence. Allison begins falling in love with "Dave," but before Ben can learn what she is up to, Rae arranges for a "rehabilitated" Allison to leave the institution for good. Yet Allison has indeed been faking her remorse to fool Rae and get Viki's "inadvertent endorsement," thereby securing her release from St. Ann's. A free woman, Allison can now reveal the most shocking part of Mitch's original plan.

Allison seeks out her secret accomplice, Jessica's new friend Natalie Balsom, who has ingratiated herself to Jessica and her family in the short time since she had arrived in Llanview. Allison herself had tracked Natalie down and lured her to town; now having secured the genetic proof they need, Natalie and Allison confront Viki with a devastating announcement: Natalie is Clint and Viki's biological daughter. Allison is delighted to reveal that when she had kidnapped the Buchanan baby in 1986, she had returned another child who grew up to be Jessica. Their biological daughter – Natalie – had been raised by another family in relative squalor. Viki cannot believe she could have mistaken another child for her own, and worst of all, she despises the scheming Natalie and wants nothing to do with her. Viki declares Jessica "her one and only daughter," but Allison has papers drawn up that give Natalie the legal right to live at Llanfair. As Natalie forcibly moves in, she and Allison make life as difficult as they can for Viki and Ben. Natalie desperately wants the money she "deserves" and the life that Jessica has "stolen" from her; once Natalie has access to her inheritance, she has agreed to share it with Allison.

A troubled Jessica begins a tenuous relationship with Natalie's wild mother Roxy Balsom, whom she believes to be her mother, and with Roxy's biological son Rex. Forging a shaky relationship with Viki and seeing Allison's greed and questionable sanity, Natalie cuts Allison loose in early 2002. Looking for cash, Allison soon convinces Roxy to pretend to be suffering from hypoglycemia. Preying on Jessica's kindness and naïveté, they hope to get money from wealthy Jessica to pay for Roxy's expensive "treatments," and then leave town. Jessica's boyfriend Seth Anderson – who had come to Llanview as Natalie's lover and accomplice but had fallen for Jessica – discovers the scheme and tells Jessica. Allison runs Seth and Jessica off the road in her car to stop them from telling the police; she frames Roxy for the accident, leaves Seth and Jessica for dead and flees Llanview. Allison returns after discovering that Jessica intends to give Roxy $100,000. Demanding her "rightful" share of the money from Roxy, Allison admits that she had run Seth and Jessica off the road. The police having bugged Roxy without her knowledge, Allison is overheard, arrested, and sent to Statesville Prison for 20 years in the summer of 2002.

Allison becomes the cellmate of Lindsay Rappaport, who soon discovers that as the former warden's daughter, Allison knows of a secret tunnel out of the prison. Lindsay tries to convince Allison to escape with her, but Allison – well-treated by the guards and other inmates and with "nothing waiting for her on the outside" – is content to stay incarcerated. While blackmailing R.J. Gannon into aiding her breakout, Lindsay tells Allison that "Dave" needs her help. Lindsay and Allison escape through the tunnel, and are met and sheltered by R.J. at Rae Cummings' empty house. Meanwhile, the pressure of Natalie's appearance had triggered the return of Viki's alternate personality, Niki Smith. Desperate for her freedom, Niki pushes Ben out of a window and frames Natalie. Losing her fragile grip on reality, an increasingly violent Allison takes Roxy and then Niki hostage, intending to kill them. Leaving Roxy behind, Allison ends up taking Lindsay and Niki to the Buchanan lodge at gunpoint. About to kill one or the other, Allison is interrupted by the arrival of Police Commissioner Bo Buchanan, officer Antonio Vega and Viki's husband Ben. Allison is subdued, but while saving Viki, Antonio accidentally shoots Ben, which leaves him in a coma that ultimately leads to his death in 2004. A completely demented Allison is placed in a padded room at St. Ann's.

In October 2002, a DNA test on Jessica proves that she is also Viki's daughter; Viki is shocked that she could possibly have given birth to twins. With all of Viki's delivery rooms nurses from 1986 dead, she and Bo visit Allison at St. Ann's. Viki asks Allison about the births and the kidnapping; a near-catatonic Allison tells Viki to "ask Mitch," just as a very-much-alive Mitch Laurence befriends Natalie, using the name "Michael Lazarus." Bo and Viki wonder what Allison means, and how Mitch might have been involved with the events surrounding Natalie and Jessica's births. Bo is disturbed when Allison questions if Mitch is really dead.

It is ultimately revealed that Mitch Laurence had secretly raped a drugged Viki around the same time she conceived a child with Clint. Viki had unknowingly become pregnant with fraternal twins, one fathered by Clint (Natalie) and the other fathered by Mitch (Jessica). Viki's obstetrician Dr. Walter Balsom, who had been one of religious leader Mitch's disciples, had taken Mitch's daughter during delivery, and Viki had never known she had given birth to more than one child. Mitch, however, had wanted his daughter to grow up loved by Viki in the lap of luxury, and had sent Allison to kidnap Clint's child. They had replaced her with Mitch's daughter (who would become Jessica), and had given Clint's daughter (who would become Natalie) to Dr. Balsom and his wife Roxy.

In early 2003, Mitch visits Allison at St. Ann's. Though Allison is "insane and incoherent," Mitch orders her to pull herself together and indicates that they still have more to accomplish.

=== 2008 ===
Barbara Garrick as Allison Perkins (2008) "I know something you don't know..."

Jessica had suffered her own bout with dissociative identity disorder from 2005 to 2006. Though not genetic, it had been explained that the illness had been triggered by childhood sexual abuse inflicted on Jessica while Viki had been running around as Niki Smith. In 2008, a recovered Jessica pretends to be her alter, "Tess," to gain the trust of schemer Jared Banks, who had crossed paths with Tess in the past. Jared contacts St. Ann's, however, and Jessica is committed – per her own past instructions – on the suspicion that Tess has indeed taken over again. As Jessica waits for her husband Nash Brennan and Viki to arrange her release on January 25, 2008, she is spotted by fellow patient Allison. Allison rushes up to Jessica and giggles, "I know something you don't know." She tells a doubtful Jessica that she has a big secret about Jessica's family. With Jessica's interest piqued, Allison makes a deal to tell Jessica what she knows – if Jessica breaks her out of St. Ann's. Jessica soon enlists Natalie's aid, telling her shocked sister that she plans to sneak Allison out of the sanitarium. Dressed as nuns, Jessica and Natalie smuggle Allison out of St. Ann's with every intention of returning her when they have heard her secret; Allison muses on the humor in the fact that now they are "absconding" with her in the night. Allison insists on an assurance of her total freedom before she will say anything. Promising to leave their family alone once she has revealed her secret, Allison leads the sisters to a familiar place where she can "show" them what she knows: the mausoleum on the grounds of Llanfair where their evil grandfather Victor Lord lies. Jessica locks Allison in, hoping to force her to reveal what she knows; undaunted, Allison opens a secret panel in the mausoleum and, thanking Mitch, takes out a wrapped package – and a gun. By morning, Jessica and Natalie find that Allison has escaped. Allison finds refuge with a reluctant Roxy, soon going to the Valentine's Day "Go Red Ball" and holding Jessica at gunpoint. Jared Banks throws himself in front of Jessica, and in a struggle for the gun he and Allison fall over a high balcony; hanging for their lives, Allison defiantly lets herself fall rather than return to St. Ann's, gloating to Jessica that her secret will die with her. Jared is saved and Allison's fall is broken by an awning, leaving her alive but in critical condition. She opens her eyes for a moment on February 29, 2008, but remains comatose.

=== 2010, 2012–13 ===
A presumed-dead Mitch Laurence turns up alive and begins terrorizing the residents of Llanview on November 9, 2009. He blackmails Dorian Lord by threatening her family, and is furious when she ultimately betrays him. On February 26, 2010, Allison appears at Statesville Prison dressed as Roxy to visit Mitch, telling him that Dorian's sister Melinda Cramer had died.

Allison escapes from Statesville Prison during the blackout in January 2012. She reappears on January 5, sneaking into Llanfair to see Viki and Clint. She confesses to them that she is no longer following Mitch and that she caused the prison break. Allison also begins hinting about Jessica and Natalie's paternity. On January 6, Allison tells Clint and Viki the truth: Jessica and Natalie are both Clint's biological daughters, and she had lied to Mitch that one baby was his to please him. She then shoots Viki and runs off. On January 13, Allison narrates the last episode of One Life to Live from an unknown room. She tells the life stories of Viki and Clint, and hints at the future that others in Llanview might have. Allison ends the episode by saying "But why spoil what happens next? You of all people should know things are rarely what they appear" and throws the script she wrote for the last episode at a man who is tied to the bed of the room she is in: Viki's brother Victor Lord, Jr., who is very much alive.

In the One life to Live online series on May 1, Victor Jr. reappears in Llanview, having at some point escaped from Allison, but then being held prisoner by an evil organization. On August 12, it is revealed that the head of this organization, Carl Peterson, is Alison's brother. Victor leaves town to protect his family but is recaptured by Allison. Carl had a vendetta against Viki and Clint's families, and part of his plan has been to drug Clint so that he acts irrationally. As a result, Clint has a violent public meltdown and is hospitalized. On the first-season finale episode of OLTL 2.0 on August 19, a horrified Natalie finds Allison at Llanview Hospital at Clint's bedside. Laughing, she injects a syringe into Clint's arm as he gasps for air, and Natalie screams.
