= Forbes March =

British-born Canadian actor (born 1973)

- Born: May 12, 1973 (age 52); Bristol, England
- Occupation: Actor
- Years active: 1993–2010

Forbes March (born May 12, 1973) is a British-born Canadian actor.

== Career ==
March originally started acting in Vancouver, where he landed his first series, Northwood. He soon started working as a model and did print work for Armani, Tommy H. and Marlboro Clothing.

March's first big acting role was Scott Chandler on the ABC daytime soap opera All My Children in 1999. Paired with new character Becca Tyree (Abigail Spencer), he was written off the series in 2000. March and Spencer soon worked together again on the 2001 independent film Campfire Stories. He next played Jesse Kilmartin on the Canadian science fiction series Mutant X from 2001 until the show's cancellation in 2004. In late July 2005, he returned to daytime television as Nash Brennan on ABC's One Life to Live from July 7, 2005 to July 16, 2008.

From July to November, 2009, March played Mason Jarvis on the daytime drama series As the World Turns. He also appeared in Degrassi Takes Manhattan, a film adaptation of the Canadian television series which was released in 2010.

After leaving As the World Turns, March quit acting and established a new business, the New York Firewood Company. The firm supplies wood for restaurants and private residences in New York City.

== Personal life ==
March was arrested in March 2023 for siphoning used cooking oil from a storage container at a diner located in Kingston, NY.

== Filmography ==
=== Film ===
List of films and roles
Year	Title	Role	Notes
1995	Dangerous Indiscretion	Guy in Commercial	
2001	Way Off Broadway	Jay	
2001	Campfire Stories	Kyle	
2005	Dirty Love	Mr. Hot Bacon	
2008	Manhattanites	Matt Malone	

=== Television ===
List of television appearances and roles
Year	Title	Role	Notes
1993–1994	Northwood	—N/a	4 episodes
1998–2000	All My Children	Scott Chandler	22 episodes
2001–2004	Mutant X	Jesse Kilmartin	66 episodes
2004	Doc	Dylan Sinclair	Episode: "Who Wants to Be a Millionaire"
2005	CSI: Crime Scene Investigation	Brad Himmel	Episode: "Unbearable"
2005–2008	One Life to Live	Nash Brennan	208 episodes
2008	Wired City	Jeremy	Television film
2009	As the World Turns	Mason Jarvis	19 episodes
2010	Degrassi Takes Manhattan	George	Television film
2010	Degrassi: The Next Generation	George	2 episodes
