= Erin Torpey =

American actress and singer (born 1981)

- Born: Erin Catherine Torpey; February 14, 1981 (age 45); Doylestown, Pennsylvania, US
- Occupations: Actress, singer
- Years active: 1990–present
- Spouse: Hamilton Von Watts (m. 2009)
- Children: 2

Erin Catherine Torpey (born February 14, 1981) is an American actress and singer. She is best known for her role as Jessica Buchanan on One Life to Live.

== Early life ==
Erin Torpey was born on February 14, 1981, in Doylestown, Pennsylvania. Her older sister is named Shannon.

== Career ==
Torpey was nominated for a Daytime Emmy in 2000. Following her departure as Jessica, the role was taken over by Bree Williamson. After leaving One Life to Live, Torpey went on to appear in the movies Dirty Deeds and Fierce Friends.

She voiced the character of Princess Aurora (from Sleeping Beauty) for Disney 2007 direct-to-video DVD release Disney Princess Enchanted Tales: Follow Your Dreams. In 2008, she voiced the Greek goddess Athena in the PSP game God of War: Chains of Olympus and reprised the role in the PS3 game God of War III and in the PSP game God of War: Ghost of Sparta, both released in 2010.

Torpey is now a singer, focusing specifically in the acoustic rock and folk genres.

On July 21–22, 2008, she returned to One Life to Live for two days as Megan Buchanan, Jessica's daughter who had previously died at birth. On September 8, 2011, Torpey returned to One Life to Live for one episode as Erin, Cristian Vega's new colleague.

== Personal life ==
In the October issue of Soaps In Depth, Torpey announced her engagement to actor Hamilton Von Watts. The two married on April 18, 2009. Erin and Hamilton welcomed their first son into the family on June 22, 2010. On December 5, 2015, they welcomed a second son.

== Filmography ==
- 1990–2003: One Life to Live as Jessica Buchanan (September 18, 1990 - January 15, 2003)
- 2004: The Handler as Loretta, 1 episode
- 2005: Dirty Deeds as Jen
- 2005: Head Case as Olivia, 1 episode
- 2006: Fierce Friend as Megan
- 2007: NCIS as Holly Stegman, 1 episode
- 2007: Bones as Woman at Basketball Game, 1 episode
- 2008: One Life to Live as Megan Buchanan (July 21–22, 2008)
- 2008: God of War: Chains of Olympus as Athena
- 2010: God of War III as Athena
- 2010: God of War: Ghost of Sparta as Athena, Erinys
- 2011: One Life to Live as Erin (September 8, 2011)
- 2012: The Avengers: Earth's Mightiest Heroes as the Invisible Woman
- 2013: Marvel Heroes as the Invisible Woman
- 2015: Agent Carter as Betty Carver

== Stage ==
- (1990): Cat on a Hot Tin Roof as Trixie (Broadway debut)
- (1993): The Goodbye Girl as Cynthia

Preceded by Eliza Clark	Jessica Buchanan on One Life to Live; 1990-2003	Succeeded by Bree Williamson
