= Nash Brennan =

- One Life to Live character
- Portrayed by: Forbes March
- Duration: 2005–2008
- First appearance: July 7, 2005
- Last appearance: July 16, 2008
- Created by: Dena Higley
- Introduced by: Frank Valentini
In-universe information
- Occupation: Vintner; Co-owner of Brennan Winery and Vineyard
- Parents: Phil Brennan; Cindy Brennan
- Spouse: Jessica Buchanan (2007–08)
- Children: Bree Brennan; Chloe Brennan

Nash Brennan is a fictional character on the American daytime drama One Life to Live, played by Forbes March from July 7, 2005 to July 16, 2008.

== Storylines ==
Nash, an aspiring vineyard owner, comes to Llanview after falling for a woman named Tess. He then discovers that Tess is actually an alternate personality of Jessica Buchanan, who has dissociative identity disorder. To complicate matters, Jessica is pregnant, and the father is either Nash or Antonio Vega, Jessica's longtime fiancé. Jessica gives birth to a daughter, Bree, in May 2006. A DNA test confirms that Nash is the father.

When Jessica and Tess are integrated in September 2006, Jessica becomes the dominant personality, and Nash is heartbroken. He lets go of Tess, only to fall in love with Jessica, who is now married to Antonio. Jessica admits to sharing his feelings, but refuses to leave her husband. Ultimately, she tells Antonio that she is in love with Nash. She and Antonio divorce, but Jessica collapses from liver cancer. At the hospital, Nash proposes, and he and Jessica are married in July 2007 before Jessica undergoes a liver transplant.

Antonio soon chooses to sell his half of Nash's vineyard and gives Nash one week to come up with the money to buy his shares before selling them to someone else. Jessica offers to buy the other half of the vineyard, but Nash refuses. Nash seeks out an investor that would be willing to be a silent partner, And soon finds himself in a game of high-stakes poker. Jared Banks, who holds an unusual interest in Jessica's family, talks his way into the game. Though at first on a winning streak, Nash soon loses everything to Jared. To make matters worse, Jared has already bought Antonio's shares of the winery. Jared then reveals his motive for coming to town: revenge on Jessica, who, as Tess, got him sent to jail.

Nash accompanies Jessica to Texas for the reading of Asa Buchanan's will, where he gets into a physical altercation with Jared. Back in Llanview, he directs Charlie Banks to the Buchanan mansion to find Jared, who unknown to Nash, is Charlie's son. Nash also successfully defends an attempt by Jared, now posing as Asa's long-lost son, to acquire the winery for Buchanan Enterprises. In early 2008, Nash becomes furious when Jessica poses as Tess in order to fool Jared into exposing himself as a fraud, and believes that Jessica is being too cavalier with her mental health. After Jared has her sent to St. Ann’s Sanitarium for a night, Jessica becomes embroiled in a mystery involving Allison Perkins. Soon, Nash finds himself in the awkward position of being indebted to Jared after he saves Jessica from Allison's murder attempt at the Go Red Ball. Jared and Nash agree to let bygones be bygones.

In the spring of 2008, Nash becomes involved with mysterious investors willing to help him with his vineyard. However, he realizes too late that the investors plan to steal his land out from under him in order to build a shopping mall. Nash agrees to Jared's offer to buy the winery via Buchanan Enterprises in order to keep his family's home from being bulldozed. Nash's last-minute salvation disappears, however, when Dorian Lord outs Jared as a fraud at the shareholders' meeting, and reveals that all transactions and contracts made by Jared are now void. Nash’s investors promptly swoop in and take the land, evicting Nash and Jessica. Enraged, Nash confronts Jared, blaming him and Natalie Buchanan for their deception and the loss of his vineyard. A brawl ensues, and Nash accidentally trips over a railing and falls through a skylight to the floor of the Palace Hotel below.

Nash is rushed to the hospital, but his internal injuries are too severe to attempt surgery. Jessica and her family are told to say their good-byes to Nash while they still have time. Natalie and Jared attempt to apologize to Nash for their part in his accident, but he orders them out. Jessica stays by Nash's side, and reveals that she is pregnant again. Heartbroken, she sobs as Nash traces the shape of a heart into the palm of her hand, then slowly pulls off his oxygen mask to kiss her one last time. Nash dies in Jessica's arms on June 5, 2008.

Between June 6, 2008 and July 16, 2008, Nash appears to Tess in her dreams.

=== Aftermath ===
Jessica is devastated by Nash's death, and for the next several months, she falls under the control of Tess, who seeks to punish Natalie and Jared. Nash and Jessica's daughter, Chloe, is delivered stillborn in November 2008. A third personality, Bess, emerges, switching Jessica's baby with newborn Hope Manning Thornhart in order to protect Jessica's sanity. Jessica seemingly recovers and believes "Chloe" to be her baby. When the truth comes out in May 2009, Bess reemerges, flees Llanview with the infant, and seeks out Nash's biological parents, Phil and Cindy Brennan.

== See also ==
- Nash Brennan and Jessica Buchanan
