= Natalie Buchanan =

- One Life to Live character
- Melissa Archer as Natalie
- Portrayed by: Melissa Archer (2001–13)
- Duration: 1986, 2001–13
- First appearance: September 23, 1986
- Last appearance: August 19, 2013
- Created by: Lorraine Broderick and Christopher Whitesell
- Introduced by: Paul Rauch (1986); Gary Tomlin (2001); Jennifer Pepperman (2013)
In-universe information
- Other names: Jessica Buchanan; Natalie Balsom; Natalie Laurence; Natalie Vega; Natalie Banks
- Occupation: Forensic technician at Llanview Police Department; Executive at Buchanan Enterprises; Receptionist at Llanview Police Department; Bartender at Rodi's Tavern; Shampoo girl at Foxy Roxy's Hair Haven; Student; Personal assistant
- Family: Lord; Buchanan
- Father: Clint Buchanan
- Mother: Victoria Lord
- Adoptive parents: Walter Balsom; Roxy Balsom
- Stepfather: Ben Davidson (2000–04); Charlie Banks (2009–11)
- Stepmother: Nora Hanen (2009–10); Kimberly Andrews (2010)
- Sisters: Jessica Buchanan
- Half-brothers: Cord Roberts; Kevin Buchanan; Joey Buchanan; Rex Balsom
- Half-sisters: Megan Gordon
- Husband: Mitch Laurence (2002–03); Cristian Vega (2003–06); Jared Banks (2009)
- Sons: Liam McBain
- Grandfathers: Asa Buchanan; Victor Lord
- Grandmothers: Olympia Buchanan; Eugenia Lord
- Uncles: Bo Buchanan; Ben Davidson; Tony Lord; Todd Manning; Victor Lord Jr.
- Aunts: Meredith Lord; Tina Lord
- Nephews: Duke Buchanan; C. J. Roberts; Shane Balsom; Ryder Ford
- Nieces: Megan Buchanan; Sarah Roberts; Bree Brennan; Chloe Brennan
- First cousins: David Vickers Buchanan; Drew Buchanan; Matthew Buchanan; Brian Kendall; Daniel Wolek; Starr Manning; Danielle Manning; Jack Manning; Sam Manning; C. J. Roberts; Sarah Roberts

Natalie Buchanan is a fictional character from the American soap opera One Life to Live. After a brief appearance in 1986, the character was played by Melissa Archer, who made her first on-screen appearance on July 16, 2001 and remained on the show until its final episode on its online revival on August 19, 2013.

== Casting ==
Archer originally auditioned for the role of Jennifer Rappaport, which Jessica Morris went on to secure. Archer then auditioned for the role of Natalie. On the day of her audition, Archer over-slept and turned up late. The casting department failed to notice this due to the number of people auditioning. In 2005, it was reported that Archer had quit the role, but ABC announced that she had signed a new contract with the show.

== Development ==
As fiery as her red hair, Natalie honed her scrappy sensibility raising herself in Atlantic City. Vulnerable and loving deep down, Natalie's softened with the discovery of her biological family. But when fighting for herself or her family, she is relentless.

— ABC on Natalie

When Natalie arrives in Llanview she reveals that she is the biological daughter of Victoria "Viki" Lord (Erika Slezak). Natalie's bad behavior on-screen transformed her into a "love-to-hate" character with viewers. But some viewers told Archer that they wanted Natalie's boyfriend Seth Anderson (Brandon Routh) to leave her and form a relationship with her sister, Jessica.

On July 16, 2003, One Life to Live celebrated thirty-five years of broadcasting on ABC. Natalie's relationship with Cristian Vega (David Fumero) played a central role in the anniversary celebrations. In the storyline the characters are shown deliberating over their wedding plans. While the characters "dream about what they want", a flashback sequence airs, consisting of weddings that previously featured in the series.

In January 2013, Jolie Lash from Access Hollywood reported that Archer had agreed to reprise the role for the online continuation of the show. Archer told Lash that Natalie is now a single mother trying to make it on her own. She does have the love and support of her family but she is "very determined" to be independent. Archer said, "I think she's trying to look for a revamp for herself because of all that she's gone through in the past 10 years and then on top of [that], the recent things that have happened." Eve Sullivan of The Advocate revealed that Archer was filming scenes with her on-screen son and that Natalie would still manage to maintain her social life.

== Storylines ==
Natalie Balsom and Seth Anderson appear in Llanview in July 2001, befriending Jessica Buchanan. Natalie later claims to be Clint and Viki's daughter; a DNA test confirms this. In 1986, Allison Perkins had kidnapped Natalie and replaced her with Jessica. Natalie and Jessica form a sisterly friendship, but when Natalie discovers that Jessica is in a romantic relationship with Seth, their feud resurfaces. A DNA test later proves that Jessica is also Viki's daughter. Mitch Laurence had raped a drugged Viki while she was pregnant with Natalie. Viki was unknowingly pregnant with fraternal twins. Dr. Walter Balsom, who had been in Mitch's cult, had stolen Jessica during delivery. Viki thought she had one child, and Mitch later sent Allison to kidnap Clint's child to swap Natalie for Jessica.

After settling in town, Natalie meets Jessica's ex-boyfriend, Cristian Vega. Viki's alternate personality, Niki Smith, returns in 2002 and pushes Ben Davidson, out of a window. He is left in a coma and Niki sees to it that Natalie takes the blame. Cristian is the only person to believe Natalie's innocence and takes it upon himself to find the real culprit. When Natalie is cleared, they begin a relationship.

Natalie and Cristian marry in 2003 and fly to Las Vegas so that Natalie can compete in a pool tournament. Antonio Vega (Cristian's brother) and Jessica go along to support them. Things go awry when Natalie is kidnapped by Walker Flynn, the brother of Mitch Laurence. John McBain, Antonio, and Cristian go to retrieve Natalie, but Cristian is caught by Flynn. Cristian takes Natalie's place and Flynn takes Cristian hostage. He is later presumed dead.

Natalie blames John for Cristian's death. John stays in Llanview to pursue the Music Box Killer. Natalie eventually forgives John and they become friends. John reveals that his first love, Caitlin Fitzgerald, was killed and he later learns that the Music Box Killer had also killed her under a different pseudonym. Natalie is distraught by the loss of Cristian and gets into a self-destructive relationship with Paul Cramer. John, mistakenly believing that Paul has slept with Natalie, indulges in flirtations with Evangeline Williamson and they began a physical relationship. This shakes Natalie and she ends things with Paul, but John tells her that he and Evangeline are no longer just casual. Natalie accepts this, but is heartbroken. Paul stalks Natalie, tries to rape her, and eventually is murdered. John breaks the law to make sure Natalie is cleared of the crime. Cristian returns in 2004 with no memories and is believed to be an impostor. He kills mobster Tico Santi and confesses to the murder, but later learns that he was brainwashed. He makes John swear not to reveal his true identity to spare his family from watching him go to prison. In 2005, Evangeline appeals his conviction, proving that he had been fooled into killing Tico, and Cristian is released. Furious over the deception, Natalie ends her relationship with John and asks Cristian for a divorce.

John and Natalie later reunite. When Natalie compromises evidence in the investigation into the murder of Spencer Truman to protect John, it affects their already struggling relationship. Natalie tells John that they should breakup. Natalie also quits her job at the police department and begins working for Buchanan Enterprises.

Natalie later meets Jared Banks and begins to fall for him, but is still upset when she sees John kissing Marty Saybrooke. John tells Natalie that he wants things to be right between them. They agree to still be friends and play pool together with John remarking, "Some of the best moments in my life involved this pool table." Natalie and Jared grow closer, but Jared is claiming to be the long lost son of Asa Buchanan. Believing that Jared is her uncle, Natalie is devastated. Jared reveals that he lied and they resume their romance. They hide the fact that David Vickers is the actual heir, but Dorian Lord exposes the secret. This causes a fight which results in the death of Jessica's husband, Nash Brennan.

Natalie and Jared get married in secret. Later, a stalker begins targeting Jessica, Natalie, and Jared. John is assigned the case after Jared is attacked and he begins to suspect that Jared is the one behind the stalking. Jared denies this, but John aggressively pursues Jared to keep Natalie safe. John is quick to believe that Jared is guilty. Natalie throws John off Jared's tracks so she can find out what really happened, and all is revealed when Mitch Laurence reappears. He confesses to having blackmailed Jared and holds a gun on him, Natalie, and Jessica. John and Brody arrive, but Mitch shoots Jared before surrendering. Jared dies and Natalie again blames John for not having listened to her about Jared. John is supportive of Natalie and, at Jared's funeral, comforts her when Mitch pops out of the coffin. Natalie learns that Mitch will not be charged for Jared's murder, and, in a mad rage, she stabs him. John sabotages the evidence of the attack, making it appear as though Mitch stabbed himself.

Later, Roxy convinces Natalie to write John a letter telling him how she feels. Natalie goes to see John, but sees Marty and John kissing and wrongfully believes that John chose Marty when John and Marty were actually saying goodbye. Natalie goes to see Brody, who is upset over Jessica believing that she is still in love with Cristian. They drink too much and end up having sex. Natalie tries to leave Llanview, but John goes after her. They reunite, but she keeps her one night stand with Brody a secret. Natalie and John consummate their reunion and a few weeks later, she discovers she is pregnant. Afraid that she will lose John, she keeps her affair with Brody a secret. Months later, a paternity test names Brody as the father of Natalie’s baby. Marty, who is bitter that John chose Natalie, begins to stalk her.

John proposes to Natalie. Natalie decides against telling John about the paternity test for fear that she would lose him. Later, Natalie holds Marty at gunpoint at the family cabin, but goes into labor. Marty delivers Natalie's baby and John arrives afterwards. John and Natalie name the baby Liam Asa McBain. John decides that he wants to get married, along with Brody and Jessica, on Valentine's Day, but the day is ruined when the truth about the paternity tests is revealed. John leaves Natalie. Brody and Natalie become closer, but Natalie discovers that Liam really is John's son and that Marty altered the paternity results. To keep the truth concealed, Marty pushes Natalie off a roof. The fall causes memory loss and Natalie does not remember that John is Liam's father. After sharing a kiss with John, she asks him for another chance, but John tells her that he has to respect that Brody is Liam's father and John can't just raise him as his own. Brody later finds out that Liam is not his son and keeps this from Natalie. Thinking that John does not love her, she accepts Brody's marriage proposal. Tina Lord discovers the paternity test and brings it to the wedding. Natalie cancels the wedding. John, who couldn't bear to see Natalie marry another man, had resigned from the police department and was headed to Seattle, but Natalie races to the airport to tell him the news.

Mitch Laurence escapes from prison and kidnaps Natalie and Jessica. John arrives to rescue them, but Natalie shoots and kills Mitch in self-defense. These events result in Natalie and John deciding to give their relationship another chance.

=== General Hospital and the 2013 One Life to Live reboot ===
When John crossed over to General Hospital in March 2012, Natalie and Liam's photos were shown to viewers, and John was heard speaking on the phone several times, though neither Natalie nor Liam ever appeared on-screen.

In August 2012, Natalie receives an envelope from Todd Manning which contains a picture of John kissing Sam Morgan. John arrives home and finds that Natalie is not there. John calls Natalie, trying to explain what happened, but Natalie angrily informs him she has taken Liam to London. John tells Natalie that she can't take Liam and leave the country. He searches for his passport, but finds that Natalie has taken it, preventing him from following her to London. Weeks later, John receives a notice informing him that Natalie has filed a restraining order against him, blocking him from herself and Liam. In October 2012, John receives a break-up letter, allegedly from Natalie.

In 2013, Natalie is now a single mother raising Liam by herself in Llanview. Natalie attends the opening of Blair Cramer's new nightclub, Shelter. Cutter Wentworth flirts with her, and Natalie, lonely for attention, is flattered. Clint suggests to her that she and Liam should move back to Llanfair, but Natalie declines.

Natalie is shocked to receive a call from John, whom she has not heard from in some time. She admits to Viki that she still loves John. A few days later, she is served with legal papers and is shocked to see that John has filed a suit for visitation with Liam. She calls Téa Delgado, who meets her and looks over the petition. She informs Natalie that John is doing this because she won't let him see Liam. Natalie denies this and says that John left her and that she'd never keep him from his son. Téa informs her that John received a restraining order allegedly from her. Natalie is shocked to learn this and had no idea that John had been staying away because of a legal injunction. The next morning, Natalie storms into Llanfair and tells her parents that she has been calling John to straighten the matter out, but was unable to reach him as he is on an assignment with the FBI. She is upset that John believes that she blocked him from their son and broke up with him via a letter. She suspects that Clint was behind it, confronts him, and he confesses. He tells her that he did it to protect her, but she blasts him for coming between her and John. She tells him that they had a chance to get past what happened with Sam, but Clint’s interference took away their choices. Natalie eventually forgives Clint. In the final scene of the series, Natalie goes to visit Clint at the hospital, but finds Allison Perkins standing over him with a syringe.

== Reception ==
In 2003, Archer won "Outstanding Newcomer" at the Soap Opera Digest Awards. She was later awarded "Favorite Triangle" storyline at the 2005 ceremony. In April 2010, a reporter for Soapnet praised Archer's portrayal of Natalie. They said she made a "brilliant scene" in which Natalie launches into a tirade of abuse aimed at Marty Saybrooke (Susan Haskell), following her interference with her romantic relationship with John McBain (Michael Easton). The reporter empathised with Natalie because people often say "awful" things they will regret; but in their opinion, "Melissa brought it home". Katherine Thurston from About.com opined, "Natalie has come from a life of lies and heartache, but since moving to Llanview has become a strong and independent women. She fights for everything she wants, especially when it comes to her family." Randee Dawn from Soap Opera Digest branded Natalie as "terminally-insecure [and] often-nasty". Chris Silk of the Naples Daily News said, "It didn't take long for Natalie to shake up one of Llanview's most prominent families." In 2021, Richard Simms from Soaps She Knows noted that Archer had been "so popular" as Natalie in comparison to her role as Serena Mason on Days of Our Lives. Simm's colleague, Charlie Mason, called Natalie and Rex "screwed-up individuals", which he blamed on Roxy's parenting.
