= Llanview =

Fictional city

Llanview, Pennsylvania
- One Life to Live location
- Created by: Agnes Nixon
- Genre: Soap opera

In-universe information
- Type: City
- Characters: Lords; Woleks; Rileys; Cramers; Buchanans

Llanview, Pennsylvania is the fictional setting for the long-running American soap opera One Life to Live. The city exists in the same fictional universe as cities from other existing or defunct ABC daytime dramas, including Pine Valley, Pennsylvania, from All My Children, Port Charles, New York, from General Hospital, and Corinth, Pennsylvania, from Loving.

== Overview ==
The community is a fictional suburb of Philadelphia. It is thought to be modelled after the Chestnut Hill section of the city, although the prevalence of Welsh placename elements may suggest an inspiration from the Welsh settlements in the area such as the Upper Merion and Lower Merion Townships, north west of the City. The series employs the Welsh language placename element Llan for Llanview, which is the county seat of Llantano County and located on the Llantano River, across from All My Children's Pine Valley. The Lord family's estate is called Llanfair.

Llanview is the home of Llanview University and the conglomerate Buchanan Enterprises. Town media is owned by the Lord family, with preeminent local newspaper The Banner owned and run by Victoria Lord. The Banner's rival publication is The Sun, run by Viki's half-brother Todd Manning. Llanview Hospital is the local medical center, and Angel Square is a central area located in East Llanview.

From 1984 to 1991 the Market Street Bridge overlooking downtown Harrisburg, Pennsylvania, stood in as the establishing shot for the show's intro.

== History ==
=== Historical storylines ===
- Storylines: 1968-1979
- Storylines: 1980-1989
- Storylines: 1990-1999
- Storylines: 2000-2012

=== Annual events ===
- Llanview Woman of the Year - Annual banquet held at The Palace Hotel to celebrate and honor a woman of Llanview for her involvement and charitable acts in the community, notable because every year something disastrous happens to the honoree during the event. Honorees have included:

2007 - Lindsay Rappaport - Arrested for Spencer Truman's murder
2005 - Evangeline Williamson - Kidnapped by the Killing Club Killer
2002 - Rae Cummings - Revealed as a fraud by Asa Buchanan
1998 - Nora Buchanan - Publicly revealed by Lindsay Rappaport to be carrying Sam Rappaport's baby

- Go Red Ball - An annual fund raiser gala held at The Palace Hotel for the American Heart Association to benefit heart health awareness; also notable because every year something disastrous happens during the event.

2009 - Dorian Lord publicly revealed the missing Buchanan heir, David Vickers and that she married him.
2008 - Allison Perkins kidnaps Jessica Buchanan holding her at gunpoint then falling over a high balcony, before revealing her big secret.

- Llanview Man of the Year - Annual gala held at Shelter by the Llanview Veterans' Organization to celebrate and honor a man of Llanview for his involvement and charitable acts in the community, notable because every year something disastrous happens to the honoree during the event. Honorees have included:

2013 - Bo Buchanan - His award presentation was crashed by his drunken (and drugged by Carl Peterson and Jeffrey Wright, who were both part of an evil organization to take down the Lord, Manning, and Buchanan families) brother Clint Buchanan (who originally was supposed to receive the award before he was dumped in favor for Bo after he punched out Shelter's doorman Diego Padilla in a intoxicated rage), who had a public meltdown during the gala before he was taken to the hospital.

=== Disasters and major events ===
- Music Box Killer (October 2003 - March 2004)

A serial killer claims three victims in New Jersey before arriving in Llanview. Trailing the killer, FBI Agent John McBain discovers the first of four Llanview murder victims, who include Gabrielle Medina. Some potential victims survive (including Jennifer Rappaport, Natalie and Jessica Buchanan, Sarah Roberts, Rae Cummings and Eve McBain) before the killer is revealed to be Dr. Stephen Haver.

- Baby Switch (March 2004 - February 2005)

Paul Cramer sets off a major chain of events between Llanview and Pine Valley by helping his sister Kelly Cramer obtain a baby after she miscarries and attempts to hide the truth from her husband Kevin Buchanan. While Babe Carey and Bianca Montgomery are simultaneously in labor, Paul fakes a helicopter crash and switches the babies around, giving Babe's child to Kelly and Bianca's child to Babe. The truth about the babies' identities is ultimately revealed in the resulting three-way custody battle. Paul is eventually murdered, and the backlash is as equally explosive as the Baby Switch itself.

- Killing Club Killer (February 2005 - August 2005)

A serial killer, re-enacting the events in Marcie Walsh's new novel, kills or kidnaps those close to her; the killer is later revealed to be someone from her past who holds a grudge against her; her former high school classmate and current publisher, Hayes Barber.

- Llanview Tornado (May 2006)

A terrible storm hits Llanview on the day of Marcie Walsh and Michael McBain's wedding day. St. James' rectory collapses, resulting in life-threatening injuries to Kelly Cramer and the death of Duke Buchanan. The adoptive parents of Tommy McBain are also killed, and Evangeline Williamson is temporarily rendered blind from flying broken glass.

- One Pure People Arson Attacks (December 2006 - August 2007)

A white supremacist group burns down buildings in Llanview, targeting people of different ethnicities and religions. The attacks escalate as potential victims survive and the authorities close in on the perpetrators, and several non-targeted people are injured or killed as collateral damage. Victims include African-Americans Vincent Jones and sisters Layla and Evangeline Williamson, Jewish Nora Hanen and her son Matthew Buchanan, Hispanic relatives Antonio and Cristian Vega and Adriana Cramer, and Syrian Talia Sahid.

- Buchanan Enterprises Shareholders' Meeting (June 2008)

At B.E.'s annual shareholders' meeting in the Palace Hotel, Dorian Lord announces her hostile takeover after revealing that Jared Banks is in fact not Asa Buchanan's son. Afterward, Jared and Nash Brennan fight, and Nash falls through a skylight to his death.

- Baby Switch 2 (November 2008-June 2009)

The storyline begins when Starr Manning finds herself pregnant with Cole Thornhart's baby. Jessica Brennan also became pregnant with the late Nash Brennan's baby. On November 6, Starr's water breaks and goes into labor. Meanwhile, Tess, Jessica's alter ego, plots revenge against her sister and boyfriend, Natalie Buchanan and Jared Banks. After planting a bomb on Natalie and Jared, Tess goes into premature labor. Starr gives birth to a girl, who she names Hope with the help of the baby's adoptive mother, Marcie McBain and Starr's mother, Blair Manning. With the help of Tess's mother, Viki's alter ego, Niki (which was only Tess's imagination), Tess gave birth to a stillborn baby girl, who she named Chloe. Chloe's death resulted in a second alter ego, Bess. Bess goes to the hospital and switches her dead baby with Starr's baby. Chloe died of Rh disease. Starr and Cole were tested and came out both Rh negative. Throughout the storyline, the Manning family mourned Hope's death. In June 2009, Jessica admitted to causing the whole switch and gave Starr and Cole back their baby. As of today, Jessica is mourning Chloe's death and Starr is raising Hope with the help of Cole and the rest of her family.

- The KAD Killer (January 2009-May 2009)

A series of stabbings in 2009 is suspected to be the work of the same killer. The victims are each left with a letter from the alphabet, seemingly the killer's calling card: Lee Halpern (K), Wes Granger (A), and Blair Cramer (D), who survives. With these clues seemingly pointing to the 1993 gang rape of Marty Saybrooke at the KAD fraternity house at Llanview University, Todd — who has a grudge against each of the victims — is the initial suspect. Suspicion then falls upon Zach Rosen, another of Marty's rapists, but the killer appears to still be at large when Talia Sahid is murdered while Zach is in custody. The killer is ultimately revealed to be Powell Lord III, Todd's cousin and yet another of Marty's rapists. Assisted by Rebecca Lewis, Powell's one-time fiancée and Todd's former love, Powell kidnaps Todd, Marty, and Todd's ex-wives Blair and Téa Delgado to give Marty closure by punishing Todd.

- Llanview Blizzard (February 2010)

A blizzard rolls into Llanview and evil cult leader, Mitch Laurence, who previously faked his death, kidnaps his daughter Jessica Buchanan and brings her to Llantano Mountain, with intention to reclaim his cult legacy through his son Rex Balsom's unborn child. While many people try to save her, a huge car crash happens injuring many people. Mitch kidnaps the carrier of Rex's baby Stacy Morasco, whose actual father is actually Oliver Fish. When Mitch finds out that Oliver is the father, he abandons Stacy in a blizzard on top of Llantano mountain. Jessica's boyfriend Brody Lovett comes to save her, but Mitch had already put Jessica in his plan, giving her selective amnesia so she can't remember anything past her high school years. Dorian Lord and Charlie Banks makes an appearance on Llantano Mountain where Charlie was planning to kill Mitch, but accidentally shoots Mitch's nurse, Nurse Charles, and Jessica. The police come and stop everything, arresting Mitch and bringing Jessica to the hospital. Meanwhile, Stacy's sister Gigi Morasco finds her and helps her give birth to Sierra Rose, but while on the way to the hospital, Stacy falls in the ice and drowns.

- The Tale of Two Todds / Who Shot Victor Lord Jr. Murder Mystery (May 2011 - January 2012)

A man with Todd Manning's old face and his old scar arrives in Llanview after escaping from being held captive in a secret compound in Louisiana for eight years. When he first sees another person who claims he's Todd, he is shocked and confused about his and the other person's identity. He then spies on his family members and remembers them with photographic memories. He also befriends Sam Manning, who says his father is Todd. The man with Todd's old face later confronts the man claiming to be Todd at his office at the headquarters of The Sun newspaper. Todd denies that he is an imposter, and then the man with a scar is later disposed by rogue CIA agent Baker by being shot, and thrown into the Llantano river and left for dead. A homeless man named Louie later rescues him, and tells him to call his friend police detective John McBain. The man with a scar then meets John at the docks, and tells him he thinks he's the real Todd. John then takes him to his home at The Angel Square Hotel to hide out from the bad guys. Todd then sneaks out to attend "The Vicker Man" movie premiere (A biopic starring con artist turned actor David Vickers, which is also produced by his wife Dorian Lord and directed by Starr Manning's friend Markko Rivera) to finally reveal himself to his family, where they are shocked to discover the man with Todd's old face. At first his family is confused with who is the real Todd, but then a DNA test is performed, and it reveals they have the same DNA! It is also later revealed that Todd's mother Irene Manning is still alive and runs the rogue CIA operation that's been keeping the man with a scar captive at the secret compound! Irene then arrives in Llanview herself to reveal herself to her old friend Viki Lord and her family. Irene then explains that she had the real Todd kidnapped in 2003 after he was abducted by evil cult leader Mitch Laurence, and put her in her compound, and switched him with his long lost twin brother Victor Lord Jr., who she raised by herself at the compound to program him with Todd's old memories. She then cut a scar on Victor Jr.'s face and also had plastic surgery done to his face to resemble Mitch's brother Walker Laurence, before she released him to go to Llanview claiming to be Todd. Victor Jr. is shocked to find out he's not the real Todd, but his wife (and Todd's ex-wife) Tea Delgado helps him to accept his newfound identity. Victor Jr. is then tragically shot and killed by an unknown assailant on August 31, 2011. After other suspects like Rex Balsom and Shane Morasco were dismissed, Todd found out in the fall of 2011 that he murdered his own brother Victor Jr. when he has a vision of his dead mother Irene telling him he killed his own brother. Todd would later set up Tomas Delgado (who was dating Todd's ex-wife Blair Cramer at the time) as the guilt culprit by having him kidnapped and held hostage in an undisclosed location to make it look like he was arrested in prison. At the end of the show's final episode on January 13, 2012, it was revealed that Allison Perkins, a former follower of Mitch Laurence's cult, was holding a still-alive Victor Jr. tied up to a bed in a mysterious location holding him hostage and having faked his death to fool his loved ones thinking he was "killed" by his brother Todd.

- Statesville Prison Break / Llanview Blackout (January 2012)

During the show's final two weeks on the air, a blackout occurred on New Year's Eve that was caused by someone cutting of the electrical power to cover-up a prison breakout at Statesville Prison that was later to be revealed to be caused by prison inmate Allison Perkins, a former follower of Mitch Laurence's (who also escaped from prison) cult. Allison and Mitch, along with other prisoners and fellow former Llanview residents Cole Thornhart (now played by Van Hughes), Troy MacIver, Hannah O'Connor and Lindsay Rappaport all escaped from prison during the blackout. Allison went to the Llanfair estate to shoot and kill both Viki Lord and Clint Buchanan after revealing to them that Clint was the biological father of Jessica Buchanan, not Mitch who they both led to believe several years ago! Viki and Clint were later taken to the hospital to recover from their gunshot wounds after Viki and Clint's daughter Natalie Buchanan and her boyfriend and police detective John McBain discovered them both at their house after John saved Natalie when she was kidnapped by her ex-husband Mitch, who John and Natalie also shot and killed. Troy showed up at Bo and Nora Buchanan's apartment to see his ex-girlfriend Nora so that he could win back her love, and to kidnap her and hold her hostage at the Buchanan Lodge. Cole showed up at the front door of the Laboulaie Mansion to surprise his ex-girlfriend Starr Manning so that he could see her and their daughter Hope Manning. Cole's other ex-girlfriend Hannah also showed up at the Laboulaie Mansion to try to kill Starr for putting her into prison for kidnapping her, Hope, and Starr's boyfriend James Ford. Starr's father Todd Manning later showed up at the mansion to stop Hannah and to arrest her to bring her back to prison. Bo came to the lodge to rescue Nora from Troy after Lindsay showed up at his apartment to tell him that Troy kidnapped Nora, but he was shot when he was struggling to get Troy's gun. Nora convinced Troy to save Bo's life, and Lindsay later showed up at the lodge to let go of Nora and to take Bo's car so that she can tell the paramedics at the hospital to get Bo to the hospital, where he later recovered from his gunshot wounds. Troy, Lindsay, and all the other escaped prisoners were eventually later round up and taken back to prison, except Allison who was still on the loose and was later revealed to be keeping a presumed dead but still alive Victor Lord Jr. at a mysterious location at the end of the show's final episode on ABC.

== Society ==
- Lord family
- Riley family
- Wolek family
- Cramer family
- Buchanan family

Mayor	District Attorney	Assistant District Attorney
Kathleen Finn (September 2011–); Dorian Lord (November 2009–August 2011); Stanley Lowell (2005–2009); Alex Olanov (1995–1996); Liz McNamara (1990–1995); Victoria Lord (1990)	Nora Hanen (June 2005–); Hugh Hughes (Temp. November 2005 - April 2006); Daniel Colson (July 2003–June 2005); Hank Gannon (1992–July 2003); Herb Callison (1978–1992)	Evangeline Williamson (September 2006–May 2007); Hugh Hughes (June 2005–September 2006); Nora Hanen (2002–June 2005); Daniel Colson (2003); Jared Hall (2000); Carla Gray (1983–1985); Debra Van Druden (1979–1983)
Police Commissioner		Llanview Hospital Chief of Staff
Bo Buchanan (1995–2006; 2006–February 2008; August 2008-January 2010; February 2010–November 2011; October 2012-); Stanley Lowell (January 2010–February 2010); John McBain (August 2008); Lee Ramsey (February 2008–June 2008); Harding (1990); Ed Hall (1970s–1979, 1982–1987)		Paige Miller (December 2006–July 2007); Dorian Lord (2005–2007); Larry Wolek (1981–2004); Jim Craig (pre-1968–1981)

== Residences ==
Mansions
- Buchanan Mansion (21 Riverside Drive) - Owned by Clint Buchanan. Residence of Clint Buchanan and Buchanan family butler Nigel Bartholomew-Smythe.
- La Boulaie (56 Lincoln Street) - Residence of Dorian Lord, Addie Cramer, Blair Cramer, Jack Manning and Sam Manning.
- Llanfair (1177 Regency Drive) - Residence of Victoria Lord and the Lord family maid Lois.
- Llanfair Carriage House (1177A Regency Drive) - Owned by Victoria Lord.

Hotels
- Angel Square Hotel (17 Esperanza Street) - Owned by Roxy Balsom.

- The Palace Hotel- Owned and operated by Renee Divine Buchanan.
  - Room #502 - Residence of Carl Peterson.
  - Room # - Residence of David Vickers Buchanan.
  - Room # - Residence of Arturo Bandini.

- Minute Man Motel
Apartments
- Buchanan Apartment (#38 Wakashin Street) - Residence of Bo Buchanan and Nora Buchanan.
- Banks Apartment - Residence of Natalie Buchanan Banks and Liam McBain.
- Buchanan/King/Manning Apartment - Residence of Matthew Buchanan, Jeffrey King, and Danielle Manning.
- Evans Apartment - Residence of Shaun Evans, Destiny Evans and Drew Buchanan II.
- Patel Apartment- Residence of Rama Patel.

Houses
- Lord Home (1970 Lindbrook Road) - Residence of Victor Lord Jr. and Téa Delgado.
- Rivera House - Residence of Ernesto Rivera and Aurelia Rivera.
- Vega House - Residence of Carlotta Vega.
- Price House - Mr and Mrs Price, Darren Price and Theo Price.

Other
- St. James' Rectory (44 High Street) - Residence of Reverend Andrew Carpenter.

== Places of interest ==
=== Businesses ===
- Buchanan Enterprises (B. E.) – Conglomerate founded by patriarch CEO Asa Buchanan and originally operated exclusive in the oil industry run by Buchanan until his death in 2007. The board of directors is populated by his progenitors, several of whom work out of offices in London. On June 28, 2011, Clint Buchanan gave B.E. to his estranged son Rex Balsom in exchange for a heart transplant from his brain dead fiancée, Gigi Morasco. On October 20, 2011, Rex quits his job running B.E. when he gives back the entire Buchanan fortune back to Clint.
  - Members:
    - CEO/Chairman Clint Buchanan
    - Llanview Executive/Board Member Bo Buchanan
    - London Executive Joey Buchanan
    - London Executive Cord Roberts
    - London Executive Kevin Buchanan
    - London Employee Reed Wagner
- Exposed - Lingerie company founded and run by Adriana Cramer and Layla Williamson. Sold in 2009 when Adriana moved to Paris.
- Designs by Delila - Small fashion house run by namesake Delila Ralston Buchanan Garretson.
- L-Mobile
- Melador Cosmetics - Company run by Dorian Lord and her niece Blair Cramer, named after Dorian and her sisters Addie and Melinda Cramer.
- B&B United
- Lord/Manning Plant - Plant owned by the Lord family which Victoria Lord and her then husband Clint Buchanan consider closing for financial reasons in 1984. It is initially the main source of employment for the O'Neill family.
- Armitage Enterprises
- B&W Trucking
- Blue Jay Music
- Lone Star Records
- Dreamfaces
- Jenkins & Friends Industries
- Cobb Industries
- Webster International
- Lord Enterprises, Inc. – legacy media assets of Victor Lord, including The Banner newspaper, WVLE-TV, and life interest of the Llanfair estate
  - Members:
    - Chairwoman/CEO: Victoria Lord - publisher of The Banner, owner of WVLE-TV (daughter of Victor)
    - Trustee: Dorian Lord (Victor Lord's widow and executrix)
    - Trustee: Todd Manning - publisher of The Sun (son of Victor)
    - Trustee: Tina Lord (daughter of Victor)
    - Trustee: Jessica Buchanan - journalist for The Banner and The Sun (granddaughter of Victor)
    - Trustee: Starr Manning (granddaughter of Victor)
    - Trustee: Jack Manning - executive assistant to Todd (grandson of Victor)
- Dyna Women - Escort service run by Lee Halpern in 1987.

=== Stores ===
- Ruiz Florist
- Balloons, Balloons, Balloons
- Babes in Toyland
- Logan's Department Store
- Ernesto's Butcher Shop
- REXX RUGS (Drugstore)

=== Media ===
The Sun, the alternate Llanview newspaper known for its radical headlines

- The Banner - The chief newspaper in Llanview, founded and owned by the late Victor Lord.
  - Currently owned and operated by his daughter, publisher Victoria Lord.
  - Employees:
    - Freelance Reporter and Blogger Jeffrey King
    - Advertising Runner Destiny Evans
- The Sun
  - Tabloid newspaper founded by Todd Manning and owned and operated by Victor Lord Jr. for eight years. Betrothed to Irene Manning as part of Victor Junior's Last Will and Testament until her death on October 3, 2011. On October 7, 2011, Jack Manning was named owner and editor-in-chief of the newspaper after Irene's death. Ownership reverted to Todd after Tina Lord, his sister, bequeathed it to him after she inherited in Irene's will. He also runs The Port Charles, New York, branch of The Sun on sister soap General Hospital
  - Reporter Jessica Buchanan rejoined The Sun on June 11, 2010. Currently taking time off to take care of her children after suffering another breakdown from her D.I.D. mental illness since the summer of 2011.
- The Intruder - Tabloid and newspaper formerly owned and operated by Dorian Lord from 1989 to 1995, which she used to exposed Niki Smith as responsible for killing Johnny Dee Hesser. She also exposed Viki and Sloan Carpenter's affair in the paper. At one point, Blair ran the Intruder as editor, until Dorian sold the paper in 1995 to Todd Manning who later renamed it the Sun.
- The Chronicle
- Lord Press - Founded by Dorian Lord in 1979 to compete with The Banner, despite the fact that she was on the Board of Directors of The Banner
- Mania magazine
- Craze magazine - Owned by Blair Cramer. A woman's magazine, Craze covers the hottest fashion trends and all the latest things. Blair herself has taken a leave of absence and the magazine is currently being run by Dorian Lord, Blair's aunt. Former employees include David Vickers, a reporter for the magazine. Currently, coverage is being done to feature Fusion Cosmetics and their model Ava Benton in Pine Valley.
  - Owner Dorian Lord
- Llannet Search (Website) - Search engine frequently used by Llanview and Pine Valley
- MyTube (Website) - Video sharing website similar to YouTube
- MyFace (Website) - A social networking website that similar to MySpace (There is an actual social network service called MyFace.)
- WVLE radio station
- WVL TV station
- Wave (TV Show) - A former television show broadcast from Pine Valley
- Nothing But the Truth (TV Show) - A former television show broadcast from Pine Valley
- The Cutting Edge (TV Show) - Tad Martin's former talk show broadcast from Pine Valley
- Fraternity Row (TV Show) - A former soap opera taped locally in Llanview
- New Beginnings (TV Show) - Erica Kane's former talk show; broadcast from Pine Valley
- He Said/She Said (TV Show) - Erica Kane's new talk show with Jackson Montgomery; broadcast from Pine Valley (On Hiatus)
- Everyday Heroes (TV Show) - Talk show broadcast from Port Charles. Former hosts include Sam McCall.
- Christina Comes Home For Christmas (Film) - 30s/40s film played on TV many times around Christmas through Llanview and Port Charles, that came out on DVD in 2012

=== Restaurants and Eateries ===
Buenos Dias Cafe, formerly the DK Diner, as seen in the December 1, 2008, episode of One Life to Live.

- Buenos Dias Cafe - (2 Angel Street) Diner in Angel Square owned and operated by Carlotta Vega since the 1990s. It burned down in 2008 and was rebuilt by Charlie Banks in the image of the Bon Jour Café in Paris, Texas, and named the Buenos Dias. Its former name was the DK Diner.
  - Employees:
    - Owner Carlotta Vega
    - Nate Salinger
- Rodi's Tavern
  - Previously owned by Rodi
  - Owned by John McBain
  - Previous Employees:
    - Suede Pruitt
    - Jason Webb
- The Palace Hotel Restaurant - Owned and operated by Renee Divine Buchanan
  - Previous Employees:
    - Jason Webb
    - LeeAnn Demerest
- Shelter Restaurant - Owned and operated by Blair Cramer
- King's Garden
- Heavenly Hash
- Back Street Bar
- The Cave
- The Coffee Shop

=== Entertainment and culture ===
- Llanview Philharmonic
- Llanview Ballet
- Atheneum Theater
- Shelter (Nightclub) - formerly known as R.J. Gannon's Capricorn (Nightclub)
  - Owned by Blair Cramer
    - Employees:
      - Manager and Club Promoter Cutter Wentworth
      - VIP Hostess Rama Patel
      - Security Guard Bruce Hunter
      - Doorman Diego Padilla
      - Bartender Nikki
      - Singer Dusky
- Break Bar
- Crown Casino
- Llanview West
- Wildlife (Gay bar)
- The Hook-Up (Male strip-joint) - formerly owned and operated by Sonia Toledo
- The Hot Spot (Bar) - Frequented by Victoria Lord Banks's alternate personality Niki Smith, and where pedophile Norman Leeds abducted five-year-old Jessica Buchanan on numerous occasions
- The Thalia (Movie theatre)

=== Volunteer foundations and Community Centers ===
- Megan Foundation
- Daughters of Llanview
- Friend of Llanview
- Armitage Foundation
- Llanview Philharmonic
- Carpenter Foundation
- Lord Love the Children
- Odyssey House
- Lord Foundation
- Outlook House
- Angel Square Community Center
- The Love Community Center
- Llanview Gay and Lesbian Alliance

=== Medical ===
- Llanview Hospital (1421 Plumtree Road)
  - Employees
    - Dr Vivian Wright
    - Dr. Kyle Lewis
    - Nurse Wojciehowicz
- St. Ann's Hospital (1756 High Street)
  - Employees
    - Dr. Edward Levin
  - Former Patients
    - Jessica Buchanan (as Tess Smith Ford or Bess Lord), Brody Lovett, Hannah O'Connor, Victoria Lord (as Niki Smith, Jean Randolph, or any of her other alternate personalities) and Marty Saybrooke.
- Cherryvale Clinic
- Wingdale Sanitarium
- Mountainview Sanitarium
- Compton's Clinic
- Langyard's Clinic
- Llanview Women's Clinic - seen on All My Children
- Boutet Long-Term Health Facility (1404 Bell Road) - Medical care center where Roxanne Balsom had Mitch Laurence kept in secret, claiming he was dead.

=== Religious ===
- St. James Church - the rectory is often seen as well—the rectory is the home of the Episcopal congregation's priest
  - Reverend Andrew Carpenter
- St. James Cemetery
  - Burial Site of:
    - Chloe Brennan
    - Nash Brennan
    - Jared Banks
    - Stacy Morasco
    - Victor Lord Jr.
- Mount Hope Cemetery - burial site of Hugh Hughes
- St. Jude's Church - church where Michael McBain and Marcie Walsh get married in 2006.
- St Barnabas Church - church where Bo Buchanan and Didi O'Neill get married in 1986.
- The River Side Chapel - church where Cord Roberts and Kate Sanders get married in 1987.
- Llanview Cathedral - church where Asa Buchanan and Renee Divine Buchanan get married for the first time 1988 as well as Cord Roberts and Tina Lord for the second time.
- Golden Light Baptist Church - church where Asa Buchanan and Samantha Vernon get married in 1981.
- St. Ambrose Catholic Church
- Monk's Hollow Monastery
- Tabernacle of Joy

=== Law and correctional ===
- Llanview City Hall
  - Mayor Kathleen Finn
- Llanview Police Department (17 Center Street)
  - Employees:
    - Police Commissioner Bo Buchanan
    - Police Officer Bruce Hunter
    - Forensics Technician Natalie Buchanan
- Law Offices of Evangeline Williamson (closed)
- Law Office of Elijah Clarke (59 Sherwood Road) (closed)
- Llantano County Courthouse
  - Employees:
    - District Attorney Nora Buchanan
    - Defense Attorney Tea Delgado Manning
- Lehigh Prison
- Stateside Prison
- Statesville Prison
  - Prisoners:
    - Troy MacIver currently resides here for kidnapping and holding Nora Buchanan hostage and shooting her husband Bo Buchanan.
    - Lindsay Rappaport currently resides here for killing Spencer Truman.
    - Tate Harmon currently resides here for killing several Llanview residents and for putting Evangeline Williamson in a coma which resulted in her death.
    - Mitch Laurence has been admitted here for kidnapping and brainwashing his daughter Jessica Brennan.
    - Allison Perkins has been admitted here for kidnapping Sierra Rose Morasco at gunpoint
    - Schuyler Joplin currently resides here for pleading guilty for shooting Bo Buchanan.
    - Hannah O'Connor resides here for kidnapping and attempting to murder James Ford, Starr Manning and her daughter Hope Manning-Thornhart.
    - Cole Thornhart has been admitted here for the murder of Elijah Clarke.
    - Greg Evans currently resides here for killing his former girlfriend from his past (and the mother of their child Destiny Evans) Charlene.

=== Museums and galleries ===
- Rappaport Art Gallery
- Buchanan-Lord Gallery
- Lord/Buchanan Gallery
- Llanview Museum

=== Amenities ===
- Serenity Springs Spa
- Foxy Roxy's Hair Haven
  - Owner and Hair Stylist Roxy Balsom
- Llanview Country Club
  - Employees:
    - Cabana Boy Nate Salinger
- Rourke's Gym
- Melador Spa

=== Education ===
- Llanview University
  - Students:
    - Matthew Buchanan
    - Danielle Manning
    - Destiny Evans
  - Former Students:
    - Langston Cramer-Left to help Markko Rivera film the movie "Vicker Man" in Hollywood, California.
    - Starr Manning- Left with her daughter Hope Manning to move to Los Angeles, California, to live with Cole Thornhart before ending up living in Port Charles, New York, after the deaths of both Hope and Cole in a car accident, and has recently moved back to L.A.
- Llanview High School (1421 Pine Point Blvd.)
  - Teachers:
    - Principal Mr. St Claire
    - Drama Teacher Mr. Axel Gweddyian (aka Mr. G)
  - Student:
    - Senior
      - Jack Manning
- Llanview Middle School
- Llanview Elementary School
  - Student:
    - 3rd Grade
      - Sam Manning
- Angel Square School for the Performing Arts - Burned down by Max Holden

=== Places to stay ===
- Palace Hotel (formerly known as Buchanan Palace, Buchanan Towers and Holden Towers)
- Angel Square Hotel
- Minute Man Motel
- Wallingford Hotel
- Hopkin's Boarding House
- Llanview Towers
- Vernon Inn
- Mountain Sunset Inn
- Bayberry Inn
- Waterside Inn
- Pleasant Valley Motel

=== Other locations ===
- Llanview Airport
- Llanview Train Station
- Llanview Bus Station
- Angel Square Credit Union
- Llanview Bank
- Llanview Motors
- Llantano Mountain State Park
- Miller's Falls State Park
- Buchanan Stadium

== Relevant locations outside of Llanview ==
=== Tri-State Area ===
- Cherryvale, Pennsylvania - retirement community outside of Llanview.

- Drs. Colin MacIver and Melanie MacIver were introduced as doctors at the Cherryvale Hospital.
- Talia Sahid was briefly transferred to the police department before transferring back to Llanview in place of Oliver Fish.

- Pine Valley, Pennsylvania - neighboring city of Llanview across the Llantano River; home of All My Children

- Erica Kane went on the lam from Pine Valley in 1983 (after being framed for murder) and took refuge at a Llanview boarding house.
- Skye Chandler moved from Pine Valley in 1999 to help Asa Buchanan ruin Ben Davidson.
- Visited several times during the 2004 baby switch storyline.
- Annie Lavery from Pine Valley came to a Llanview clinic one time in April 2008.
- Cole Thornhart traveled and hid in Pine Valley while running from the Llanview Police after murdering Elijah Clarke.

- Port Charles, New York home of General Hospital and Port Charles.

- When Skye Chandler left town in 2001, she moved to Port Charles in hopes of finding her biological father. She later left in 2008.
- Patrick Thornhart's twin brother Ian Thornhart resides here.
- Marco Dane moved to Port Charles in 1992, but left town the next year.
- Todd Manning, Starr Manning, and John McBain moved to Port Charles in 2012.

- Atlantic City, New Jersey

- In 1984, Rafe Garretson and Samantha Vernon got married at Crown Casino Hotel in Atlantic City.
- In 1989, Marco Dane and Megan Gordon got married in a little chapel in Atlantic City.
- In 2003, Rex Balsom and Jennifer Rappaport ran away and eloped in Atlantic City.

- Corinth, Pennsylvania - home of Loving.
- New York City, New York - home of The City.
- Springfield, United States - home of Guiding Light.

- While trying to figure out why there were two Todd Mannings, Jack Manning suggests that one might be a clone, referring to a Guiding Light storyline from 1998; "It happened to some lady in Springfield once!"

=== Other places ===
- Mendorra - a small European monarchy with many ties to Llanview residents.
- St. Blaze's Island- A private island getaway once owned by Asa Buchanan. Asa left ownership of the island to his butler Nigel Bartholomew-Smith in his will after his death in 2007, but Asa's ex-wife Alex Olanov convinced Nigel to give her ownership of the island along with Asa's private yacht so that he could keep the secret that David Vickers is Asa's long-lost son and the secret heir to the Buchanan fortune (which was later revealed that David was really the biological son of Asa's son Bo Buchanan instead!).
- Paris, France

- Adriana Cramer left Llanview to work in Paris, France.
- Layla Williamson currently resides here after accepting a job under a top fashion designer. She plans to commute back to Llanview periodically to see her former fiancée Cristian Vega
- Tomas Delgado, an American painter, was contacted by Blair Cramer when she received a mystery painting from her late husband Elijah Clarke. Tomas left Paris in 2011 to be with his sister Tea Delgado in Llanview.

- Paris, Texas

- Victoria Lord left Llanview in 2007 and end up working as a waitress at the Bonjour Cafe to forget the troubles of her life and rediscover herself.
- Asa Buchanan's ranch is located here where his last will and testament was read. It is now owned by Asa's good friend Chuck Wilson III.
- Charlie Banks left Llanview in 2011 after his divorce from Victoria Lord to rebuild the Bonjour Cafe.

- Savannah, Georgia

- Cassie Callison resides in Georgia with her son River Carpenter.

- Niles, Michigan

- Rex and his aunt Corinne Balsom lived here during his teenage years after Roxy left him here; Corinne continues to reside here.
- Gigi and Stacy Morasco grew up here; Gigi eventually left for Paris, Texas while pregnant with Shane while Stacy left for Las Vegas, Nevada, after their parents died.
- Brody Lovett lived here with his family before being deployed for the Iraq war; his sister Nadine continues to live in the family house after their mother died.

- Seattle, Washington

- Currently where Michael McBain, Marcie McBain and newly born Gabriel Thomas McBain reside.
- Place where Matthew Buchanan got his surgery to walk again; performed by Dr. Nance and Dr. Greg Evans

- Mayfair, London, England

- Kevin Buchanan, Natalie Buchanan, and Liam McBain resides here at the Buchanan Compound.
- Kelly Cramer and Joey Buchanan resided here in the Buchanan Compound until their return to Llanview in 2010. At the end of the summer 2011, the couple reunited and returned to London.
- Zane Buchanan attends a boarding school here.
- Cord Roberts and his wife Tina Lord also reside and work in London.
- Nevel, butler Nigel Bartholomew-Smythe's cousin, also serves for the Buchanan's in their London compound.

- Tahiti, French Polynesia

- Place where Téa Delgado was abandoned by Todd Manning
- Téa Delgado and former husband Ross Rayburn raised Todd's daughter Danielle Rayburn in Tahiti for 15 years.
- Ross Rayburn resided here after returning from the dead and revealing to Danielle that Todd Manning is her biological father until his real death in 2010 when he was shot by his brother Elijah Clarke in Llanview, and drowned to death in the Llantano River at the docks.
- Blair Cramer and Elijah Clarke were married here on August 30th, 2010. Later, Elijah was shot by Blair in self-defence after she had found out he had been responsible for several murders.

- California, United States

- Melinda Cramer was hospitalized at Compton Clinic periodically. She was remitted and resided at the clinic from late 1997 till her death in March 2010 from an unexpected "heart attack". It was later revealed, she had been murdered by Elijah Clarke.
- Markko Rivera is currently living in Los Angeles attending UCLA and directing David Vickers new movie Vickerman.
- Langston Wilde is currently living here as the screenwriter for Vickerman.

- Silver Spring, Maryland

- Hometown of Layla Williamson and Evangeline Williamson.
- Evangeline Williamson has resided here in the care of her mother, Lisa Williamson, after being lapsed into a coma in 2007. On July 26, 2010, Evangeline died after being taken off life support.

- Basseterre, Saint Kitts

- Tea Delgado decided to reside here in a hospice in St Kitts during her final days of being diagnosed with a fake inoperable brain tumor. Dr. Greg Evans was blackmailed into faking her death and has been taking care of her during this time.

- Rabat, Morocco

- On August 18th, 2010 David Vickers was placed in a Morocco prison after being kidnapped by Clint Buchanan the day David and Dorian were to be married.

- Anchorage, Kentucky

- On August 19, 2011, Rex Balsom and Natalie Buchanan both go to investigate a strip club called "The Spotted Pony", based on a clue they got from both psychic Madame Delphina and David Vickers concerning the whereabouts of Gigi Morasco based on Rex's visions of his dead fiancée. Rex also discovers that Kimberly Andrews, the best friend of Gigi's deceased sister Stacy Morasco, is stripping there using the stage name of his late wife "Gigi". "The Spotted Pony" is also connected to a dark and mysterious secret that both Kim and her con artist brother and former scamming partner Cutter Wentworth are hiding from their friends and loved ones. On October 14, 2011, it was revealed that the secret was that Cutter killed a rich man named Mr. Berger by putting too much "mickey" into his drink when Cutter enlisted Kim to seduce Mr. Berger for his money by working as a stripper at the club several years ago. The incident was witnessed by Kim's former French boarding school roommate Rama Patel, who took a picture of Cutter and the dead guy with her cell phone, and wanted to use that picture to blackmail Cutter ever since. Rama also wanted to get her money back from Kim that she stole from her to pay for her plastic surgery to improve her looks. Kim is also keeping her friend Stacy Morasco in a local hospital in this town, which was later revealed that she had plastic surgery in South America to look like her late sister Gigi so that she could take over her life after she survived drowning in that frozen lake on Llantano Mountain outside Viki's cabin, and ended up in a coma when she decided to track down her sister in Llanview, and ended up trapped in the basement of a rental house with Gigi and were both poisoned by leaking carbon monoxide that also killed her sister. In November 2011, it was later revealed that Stacy was really her sister Gigi, and that Stacy was the one that died in that basement. Cutter is later arrested for the murder of Mr. Berger and was imprisoned for his crime until he was released from prison.

- Rio de Janeiro, Brazil

- In 2011, Stacy Morasco went to Rio to get plastic surgery done by Dr. Fascinella to look like her sister Gigi Morasco. Dr. Fascinella also did surgery on Jane Campbell to look like Pine Valley resident Erica Kane that same year.
