= Asa Buchanan =

- One Life to Live character
- Portrayed by: Philip Carey (1980–2008); Brian Smiar (2000); Robert S. Woods (2008); Brian Victor Johnson (2008)
- Duration: 1980–2008
- First appearance: February 18, 1980
- Last appearance: December 29, 2008
- Created by: Gordon Russell; Sam Hall
- Introduced by: Joseph Stuart
- Book appearances: Patrick's Notebook
- Crossover appearances: All My Children
In-universe information
- Other names: Jeb Stuart
- Occupation: Founder and CEO of Buchanan Enterprises
- Family: Buchanan
- Brothers: Pike Buchanan
- Sisters: Jeannie Buchanan Garretson
- Spouse: Olympia Buchanan (until 1982); Pamela Stuart (1976; void, 1986–1987); Samantha Vernon (1981; void); Delilah Ralston (1983); Becky Lee Abbott (1983–1985); Renée Divine (1988–1992, 1999–2001, 2004–2007); Blair Cramer (1992–1993); Alex Olanov (1994; void, 1996); Gabrielle Medina (2001–2002); Rae Cummings (2002–2003)
- Sons: Clint Buchanan; Bo Buchanan; Ben Davidson
- Grandchildren: Cord Roberts; David Vickers Buchanan; Kevin Buchanan (adoptive); Joey Buchanan (adoptive); Drew Buchanan; Rex Balsom; Jessica Buchanan; Natalie Buchanan; Matthew Buchanan
- Grandparents: Buck Buchanan; Dorothy "Blaize" Pardee
- Nieces and nephews: Rafe Garretson; Austin Buchanan
- Other relatives: Jasper Buchanan; Wanda Webb Wolek; Paul Webb; Jason Webb; Megan Rappaport

Asa Buchanan is a fictional character and patriarch of the Buchanan family on the American serial drama One Life to Live. The Texan industrialist father of newly arrived characters Clint and Bo Buchanan, Asa was originated in February 1980 by Philip Carey. Carey portrayed the role continually for nearly three decades, through to his final pre-taped appearance in 2008. Throughout those years, Asa's ruthless business dealings and attempts to both protect and control his family members drive much of the drama in the series.

== Casting ==
Actor Philip Carey portrayed patriarch Asa as a contract player for over 27 years from the character's on-screen inception in December 1979. Carey took medical leave from the soap in 2006, returning to the role later that year. Brian Smiar temporarily played Asa on November 16 and 17, 2000. In 2007, Carey turned down the show's offer to play the character in a supporting capacity in 2007. He made his final regular appearance as Asa on the episode first-run April 26, 2007. The character subsequently died offscreen on August 16, 2007, coinciding with the series' 10,000th episode celebration, which brought back characters from the show's past to attend the funeral. In November 2007, Carey briefly reprised the role for three episodes in Asa's videotaped will, airing November 9 to November 13, 2007. On July 16, 2008, Carey appeared as Asa's ghost, and also returned on July 21, 2008, for the series' 40th anniversary, as character Victoria Lord, Asa's former daughter in law visits, visits Heaven after a car accident. Beginning in the same episode, Robert S. Woods appears as a young Asa in a storyline in which the characters Bo and Rex find themselves in 1968. Carey returned on August 19, 2008, as Asa's ghost, who appears to Bo. Brian Victor Johnson took over the role of the young Asa from August 22, 2008 to August 25, 2008 after Bo is transported back to 2008. Carey appeared yet again on December 29, 2008, in a videotaped message recorded by Asa before his death.

== Storylines ==
The patriarch of the Buchanan family, Asa is a self-made billionaire (having purchased his first oil well at age 22) and Chief Executive Officer of Buchanan Enterprises (casually called "B.E." by the family). Born on October 31, 1924, and raised in Texas, Buchanan moves the headquarters of his company to Llanview, Pennsylvania, in 1980 to stay close to his two headstrong, but troubled sons, Clint and Bo. Thought dead by her sons, Asa's first wife Olympia had actually been banished to Europe by Asa after having an affair with Yancy Ralston. Living in Paris as her twin sister Nicole Bonard, Olympia (Taina Elg) surreptitiously arrives in Llanview and attempts to shoot Asa as he marries Samantha Vernon (Julia Montgomery) but is snatched by Asa's nephew Rafe Garretson (Ken Meekler) before she can reveal herself. An escaped Olympia dons a costume and mask identical to Samantha's and reveals herself at the Buchanan Ball. Olympia later falls over a balcony at a lavish costume party, and, on her deathbed, she tells Bo that Asa was not his father.

Desperate to know his real family, Bo visits his aunt Euphemia Ralston, who had a vendetta against Asa for helping to bankrupt her family after Olympia's affair with Yancy. Euphemia sends her nephew Drew to Llanview to help try to figure out a way to ruin Asa and get back some of the family money, but that is thwarted when Euphemia's daughter, Delila, shows up in Llanview and marries Asa while in love with Bo. Yancy's widow, Blanche, shows up and reveals that Yancy is sterile. Bo and Delilah order Euphemia, who knew all along about this, to leave town. Delilah divorces Asa and marries Bo, but that marriage ends quickly because of her lies. Drew Ralston marries Becky Lee Abbott after she becomes pregnant with Bo's baby, but after Drew is killed, Asa marries Becky so he can raise his grandson. That marriage ends after Becky Lee is believed to be dead.

In 1986, Tina Lord (Andrea Evans) discovers that Asa has been leading a double life for years; on the tropical island of Malakeva, he is known as Jeb Stuart and has been "married" to a woman named Pamela (Christine Jones) for a decade. Tina tells Pamela that her "husband" is not a sea captain, as she believes, but actually a millionaire with a family in Llanview. Noting that Asa and Pamela's marriage is not legal, Tina convinces Pamela to pretend she is dying to manipulate Asa into marrying her for real. He does on January 20, 1986, and Pamela springs from her "deathbed" and confronts her husband. Arriving in Llanview to live as "Mrs. Asa Buchanan", Pamela is at first a thorn in his side. As Asa realizes he wants her to be his wife in every sense of the word, she demands a divorce — and half of his fortune. Their marriage ends in 1987.

In 1999, it is revealed that Asa's on-again off-again wife Renée Divine (Patricia Elliott) had conceived a son by Asa when they had been involved in their youth and had put the boy up for adoption. Max Holden (James DePaiva) poses as the missing heir, but Asa and Renee's real son turns out to be Ben Davidson (Mark Derwin), adopted brother of Sam Rappaport and love interest of Asa's former daughter-in-law Viki Lord Carpenter.

In October 2006, David Vickers (Tuc Watkins) finds out that Asa once had an affair with David's mother, Emma Bradley, but Asa denies it. Later, David's brother Dr. Spencer Truman (Paul Satterfield) claims to be Asa's son, but a DNA test proves otherwise. A conversation between Asa and his longtime butler Nigel Bartholomew-Smythe (Peter Bartlett) hints that there is more to the story.

On August 16, 2007, Asa dies in his sleep and is found by Nigel. Grandsons Cord Roberts (John Loprieno), Kevin Buchanan (Dan Gauthier), and Joey Buchanan (Nathan Fillion), and ex-wife Alex Olanov (Tonja Walker), return for his funeral. On August 17, 2007, Nigel tells a returned Max Holden that Asa does indeed have another son: David Vickers. Max advises Nigel to wait to tell the rest of the family, and an eavesdropping Alex overhears. She begins a search for David herself.

Asa's will is executed in November 2007 as a video is played featuring the Buchanan patriarch. He bequeaths his mansion to former daughter-in-law Nora Hanen (Hillary B. Smith), who has been living there with her and Bo's son Matthew (Eddie Alderson) since her house burned down; he also leaves his yacht, the Jeb Stuart, and his tropical island, St. Blaize's, to loyal servant Nigel. Asa also notes the existence of his other son, though not his identity, and finally states that he will not be splitting Buchanan Enterprises among his heirs and taking the chance that the company will be split up or partially sold. He instead challenges the family to run it as a cohesive team and, if the company's stock rises, be rewarded handsomely in a year. Alex appears, married to an in-the-dark David, and blackmails Nigel with the facts of David's parentage. Not wanting the Buchanans to discover that con man David is one of them, Nigel gives his inheritance to Alex in exchange for her silence. Meanwhile, Buchanan Enterprises up-and-comer Jared Banks (John Brotherton)— an admirer of Asa's who is already a favorite of widow Renee and circling Natalie Buchanan (Melissa Archer) romantically — overhears Alex's news and pressures Nigel to pass him off as Asa's heir instead. Nigel does, and Jared feigns disinterest, armed with a lock of David's hair to prove his claim.

== The many wives of Asa Buchanan ==
Asa is one of the most married male characters in daytime television, having been married 14 times to 10 different women (although three marriages were technically invalid).

1. Olympia Buchanan (pre-1968–82, dissolved by her death)
2. Pamela Oliver Stuart (1976, invalid)
3. Samantha Vernon (June 24, 1981, invalid)
4. Delilah Ralston (February 7, 1983 – June 1983, divorced)
5. Becky Lee Hunt (July 11, 1983– June 1985, divorced)
6. Pamela Oliver Stuart (January 20, 1986– March 1987, divorced)
7. Renée Divine (November 30, 1988–92, divorced)
8. Blair Cramer (June 16, 1992–January 1993, divorced)
9. Alex Olanov (November 1994, invalid)
10. Alex Olanov (March 29, 1996–96, divorced)
11. Renée Divine (May 18, 1999 – May 2001, divorced)
12. Gabrielle Medina (May 2001–February 2002, divorced)
13. Gretel Rae Cummings (August 2002–February 2003, divorced)
14. Renée Divine (February 14, 2004 – August 16, 2007, dissolved by his death)

== Reception ==
In 2009, Mike Barnes from The Hollywood Reporter called Asa a "formidable business tycoon". Michael Fairman from Michael Fairman TV called Asa "beloved". In 2024, Charlie Mason from Soaps She Knows also placed Asa 35th on his ranked list of Soaps' 40 Most Iconic Characters of All Time, writing, "As ornery as the most cantankerous of mules, the late Phil Carey's tough-as-leather tycoon rode tall in the saddle even when he wasn't on horseback."
