= Bo Buchanan =

- One Life to Live character
- Portrayed by: Robert S. Woods (1979–2013); John-Paul Lavoisier (2008); Tanner Woods (2008)
- Duration: 1979–86; 1988–2013
- First appearance: November 1979
- Last appearance: August 19, 2013
- Created by: Gordon Russell; Sam Hall
- Introduced by: Joseph Stuart; Paul Rauch (1988); Jennifer Pepperman (2013)
- Book appearances: Patrick's Notebook
- Crossover appearances: All My Children
In-universe information
- Other names: Bo Ralston; Bill Brady; Asa Buchanan; Beaufort Oglethorpe Buchanan
- Occupation: Llanview police commissioner Former Producer of the soap opera Fraternity Row; Owned WVLE TV station Worked at the Lord/Manning Plant (undercover); Movie producer with Marco Dane; Former Executive at Lone Star Records
- Family: Buchanan
- Parents: Asa Buchanan; Olympia Buchanan
- Stepmother: Pamela Oliver Stuart (1976, 1986–87); Samantha Vernon (1981); Delilah Ralston (1983); Becky Lee Abbott (1983); Renée Divine (1988–92, 1999–2001, 2004–07); Blair Cramer (1992–93); Alex Olanov (1994, 1996); Gabrielle Medina (2001–02); Gretel Rae Cummings (2002–03)
- Brothers: Clint Buchanan
- Half-brothers: Ben Davidson
- Wife: Delilah Ralston (1983–84); Didi O'Neill (1986–88); Sarah Gordon (1990–92); Cassie Callison (1991); Nora Hanen (1995–99, 2010–)
- Sons: David Vickers; Drew Buchanan; Matthew Buchanan
- Stepchildren: Rachel Gannon
- Grandchildren: Unnamed grandchild; Drew Buchanan II
- Aunts and uncles: Pike Buchanan; Jeannie Buchanan
- Nieces and nephews: Cord Roberts; Kevin Buchanan (adoptive); Joey Buchanan (adoptive); Jessica Buchanan; Natalie Buchanan; Rex Balsom
- First cousins: Austin Buchanan; Rafe Garretson

Beaufort Oglethorpe "Bo" Buchanan is a fictional character from the American soap opera One Life to Live, portrayed by Robert S. Woods.

== Casting and awards ==
Robert S. Woods created the character of Bo in November 1979. Woods originally screen tested for the recast of Richard Abbott, cousin of central heroine Victoria "Viki" Lord Riley (Erika Slezak). He was offered the newly created part of Bo instead by then-executive producer Joseph Stuart, and he accepted. Woods went on to play Bo from the character's inception through 1986, and returned in 1988 to play him through the series finale on January 13, 2012. Woods reprised the role when new regular episodes of OLTL debuted on Hulu, iTunes, and FX Canada via The Online Network April 29, 2013.

A 2008 time travel storyline transplants Bo and Rex Balsom (John-Paul Lavoisier) back to 1968, where Woods portrays his character's father Asa Buchanan, and Lavoisier plays a young Bo from July 21 through August 26, 2008. As Bo and Rex return to the present, Woods' real-life son Tanner plays young Bo on August 26, 2008, as he departs to serve in the Vietnam War.

Woods won the Daytime Emmy Award for Lead Actor for the role in 1983, also earning nominations in 1986, 1993, 1994, 1999, 2000, and 2012, multiple Soap Opera Digest Award nominations, and four MVP trophies from Soap Opera Update.

== Storylines ==
=== Lost love and business ===
Vietnam War-veteran Bo arrives in the fictional city of Llanview, Pennsylvania, in November 1979, following his brother Clint (Clint Ritchie) from their native Texas. Clint had secured the chief editing position at Llanview's flagship newspaper, The Banner, replacing the ailing husband and editor for Banner publisher Victoria Lord Riley (Erika Slezak), Joe Riley (Lee Patterson).

Somewhat unlucky in love, over the years Bo suffers many breakups, including the deaths of two wives (Didi O'Neill in 1988 and Sarah Gordon in 1992) and a fiancée (Gabrielle Medina in 2004). He pursues many occupations, such as becoming a music record executive and a film and television producer. In the late 1980s, Bo produces a Llanview-based opera, Fraternity Row, which in 2008 is revealed to have given a fictionalized version of rapper Snoop Dogg his break in show business, cementing a lifelong friendship between them. In 1995, Bo becomes Llanview's police commissioner.

=== Nora and family ===
Bo meets attorney Nora Hanen Gannon (Hillary B. Smith) in October 1992; that Thanksgiving, he and wife Sarah Gordon (Jensen Buchanan) are involved in a hit and run accident and Sarah is killed. Over the next several months Nora and Bo work side by side trying to track down the killer. The case is finally closed and the two become best friends; their relationship slowly grows into romance after a kiss on New Year's Eve. The couple's first date is at Serenity Springs and is soon followed by a slew of junk food eating and jitterbug dates. Bo and Nora first have sex in April 1993 and express their love in May 1993. However, Nora's chronic headaches worsen, leading her to believe that she is the one who caused the accident leading to Sarah's death. Bo soon proves this to be false and proposes marriage. Nora is diagnosed with a brain tumor but recovers. Bo and Nora marry on June 1, 1995, at St. James Church. The ceremony is officiated by Reverend Andrew Carpenter (Wortham Krimmer), Rabbi Heller, and rock and roll singer Little Richard.

Bo is devastated when his son Drew Buchanan, a police officer, is killed in the line of duty on September 16, 1998. Nora hopes to conceive a child to give her husband a reason to live; out of desperation she turns to former lover Sam Rappaport (Kale Browne). The pregnancy pulls Bo back onto his feet, but he and Nora later divorce in 1999 when it is revealed that Nora's son Matthew had apparently been fathered by Sam. It is not until Sam's death in 2003 that the truth comes out about how Matthew (Eddie Alderson) is Bo's son, Sam had been aware of it, and that he kept the secret.

In July 2008, Bo and young Rex Balsom (John-Paul Lavoisier) travel back in time to 1968; Bo finds himself reliving his past as his own father Asa Buchanan, while Rex is Bo. They both ultimately return as history writes itself with one exception: Rex (as Bo) sleeps with Asa's ex-mistress Emma Bradley. This proves significant in February 2009 when a paternity test determines that David Vickers (Tuc Watkins) — whom a previous DNA test had supposedly established is Asa's son by Emma — is actually's Bo's son.

In 2009, Nora and Clint (Jerry verDorn, onward) begin a relationship. Bo and Nora spend more time together when Matthew is in an accident and becomes paralyzed; soon Clint senses that Bo and Nora still harbor feelings for each other. Nora accepts Clint's proposal, but she kisses Bo the night before her wedding to Clint. Nora loves Clint and goes through with the wedding to Clint, but she becomes further wrapped up with Bo when Matthew sues his parents for the right to have a dangerous surgery that may help him walk again. Bo and Nora finally confess their love for each other and have an affair. When Clint finds out, he furiously throws Nora out and demands a divorce, blackmailing her into signing over the Buchanan mansion, which Asa had left to her in his will.

In April 2010, Bo is shot by Schuyler Joplin (Scott Clifton) but survives, soon asking Nora to marry him on April 9, 2010. In June 2010, after a decade apart, Bo and Nora remarry in a ceremony officiated by David.

On finale episode, first-run January 13, 2012, Bo became a grandfather to Drew Buchanan II, via Matthew.

In October 2012, on General Hospital, Téa Delgado's baby is stolen by Heather Webber. Anna Devane mentions that Bo is still the Police Commissioner in Llanview and John McBain notes that he is doing everything he can to help apprehend Heather. After Heather is apprehended, Téa learns that her child is actually the child of Sam McCall, and that Todd Manning switched her child with Sam's. Distraught, Téa returns to Llanview.
