= Lindsay Rappaport =

Fictional Character

- One Life to Live character
- Portrayed by: Catherine Hickland
- Duration: 1998–2009, 2012
- First appearance: May 14, 1998
- Last appearance: January 6, 2012
- Created by: Pam Long
- Introduced by: Jill Farren Phelps (1998); Frank Valentini (2012)
In-universe information
- Occupation: Artist and art dealer; Owner of the Lindsay Rappaport Art Gallery
- Parents: Dennis Farrell
- Siblings: Melanie Farrell
- Spouse: Sam Rappaport (pre-1998); Clint Buchanan (1998–99)
- Children: Will Rappaport; Jennifer Rappaport
- Grandchildren: Megan Rappaport

Lindsay Rappaport is a fictional character on the American daytime drama One Life to Live. She was portrayed by Catherine Hickland, who debuted May 14, 1998, and played her continually through October 2008. Hickland briefly reprised the role in July 2009. Hickland returned to the role of Lindsay from January 4–6, 2012, for the show's ABC Daytime finale.

== Character background ==
Lindsay was born off-screen to a stern and disapproving father, Dennis Farrell, who doted on her younger sister, Melanie, while shunning Lindsay. Even after Lindsay married hotshot lawyer Sam Rappaport and raised his two children, Lindsay was disappointed and angered when Sam's fell out of love with her and in love with Nora Hanen. A series of desperate affairs followed for Lindsay, including one with brother-in-law, Colin MacIver, and the loveless marriage of Sam and Lindsay finally ended as their two children reached adulthood.

== Storylines ==
Lindsay arrives in Llanview following Sam, immediately sparking a rivalry with Nora Hanen. She befriends and marries Clint Buchanan, but the marriage falls apart. Obsessed with the woman she blamed for ending her marriage, Lindsay engages in a vendetta against Nora, aiming to break up her marriage to Bo Buchanan; this begins a feud which would last a decade. A business partnership, meanwhile, blossoms with Dorian Lord, and Lindsay forges a friendship with R.J. Gannon.

Sam and Lindsay's children, Will and Jennifer, appear in 1998 and 2001, respectively. Jen ends up turning to prospective stepmother Nora as a maternal figure for advice on life and relationships, to the displeasure of Lindsay.

Lindsay's relationship with R.J. eventually blossoms into a romance, and she helps him gain custody of his granddaughter, Jamie, after the death of R.J.'s daughter, Keri Reynolds. Lindsay becomes attached to Jamie, but her relationship with R. J. ends in early 2007. Single again, Lindsay rededicates herself to a motherly relationship with Jen's best friend, Marcie Walsh McBain, her new husband Michael McBain, and their adopted son "Tommy". At the same time, she busies herself with numerous children's charities, advocacy groups for single mothers, and showcases the work of artist Cristian Vega in her gallery.

In August 2007, Lindsay is shocked to discover that she had won Llanview's famed "Woman of the Year" award. After Nora presents the award, an emotional Lindsay tells the audience she can not accept it, after which John McBain arrests her for the murder of Spencer Truman.

During Lindsay's arraignment, she gives an emotional account of the circumstances and events that led her to kill Spencer: she knew that Spencer had arranged for the McBains to adopt Todd Manning’s missing infant son, and murdered him to prevent the McBains from losing Tommy. Lindsay then collapses into catatonia and is remanded to St. Ann’s psychiatric hospital for evaluation. After learning of visits from several friends, such as Bo and R.J., Nora arranges to have criminal proceedings reconvened, convinced that Lindsay has feigned mental illness. On January 3, 2008, Lindsay is deemed fit to stand trial but also determined to have been insane at the time of the murder. With both Bo and R.J. offering to be her legal guardian, Lindsay is returned to St. Ann’s sanitarium. Lindsay is eventually remanded into Bo's guardianship.

After her release, Lindsay confides in R.J. that she had indeed faked a breakdown to avoid prosecution for murder. R.J. writes Lindsay a letter thanking her for confiding in him. The letter gets mixed with Nora's court filings, though, and Nora forces Lindsay to reveal her secret. Lindsay's attorney attempts to get her murder charges dropped on double jeopardy but fails, and she pleads guilty. Bo visits Lindsay in jail on August 27, 2008. Hickland appears as a vision of Lindsay in Rex Balsom’s dream sequence on October 1, 2008. Bo visits Lindsay in Statesville again on July 30 and 31, 2009.

During the Statesville Prison break in January 2012, Lindsay breaks into Bo's apartment to warn him about the plan of Troy MacIver to kidnap Nora. Bo and Lindsay thwart Troy’s plans. Nora thanks Lindsay for saving their lives and agrees to a truce. Bo and Nora promise Lindsay to do everything they can to get her paroled. As Lindsay leaves, she has a smirk on her face and the audience is left to wonder where Lindsay went. Catherine Hickland stated she purposefully played up that moment ambiguously to leave story options open for the Prospect Park continuation of One Life to Live.

== Reception ==
For her portrayal of Lindsay, Hickland was nominated in the category of Female Scene Stealer at the 15th Soap Opera Digest Awards.
