= Margaret Cochran =

- One Life to Live character
- Tari Signor as Margaret Cochran
- Portrayed by: Rebecca Mader (2004); Tari Signor (2004–2008)
- Duration: 2004–2006; 2008
- First appearance: March 26, 2004
- Last appearance: December 18, 2008
- Created by: Michael Malone
- Introduced by: Frank Valentini
In-universe information
- Occupation: Accountant for Buchanan Enterprises
- Sisters: Ellen Cochran Foley
- Sons: Sam Manning
- Nieces: Ginger Foley

Margaret Cochran is a fictional character on the soap opera, One Life to Live.

== Casting ==
The character was originated by Rebecca Mader from March 26 until June 8, 2004. Tari Signor assumed the recurring role on June 9, 2004, through June 16, 2006. Signor returned for a short run from January 17–24, 2008, and briefly on December 18, 2008.

== Storylines ==
A quiet and lonely accountant for Buchanan Enterprises, Margaret Cochran is approached by publisher Todd Manning. Looking for information to use against his nephew Kevin Buchanan — who had been with Todd's fiancée Blair Cramer — Todd leads Margaret on, making her believe he has feelings for her. Eventually, Todd reveals to Margaret that he had been using her, and Margaret is furious when she hears that Todd is engaged to and in love with Blair. Having fallen in love with Todd, Margeret is now obsessed with him. Deciding that she cannot let Todd and Blair be together, Margaret creates a fake photo of herself in bed with Todd and shows it to Blair, claiming that she and Todd have been sleeping together. Eventually, Blair realizes that Margaret is lying. and everyone in Llanview sees that Margaret is mentally unstable. Margaret kidnaps Todd and Blair's son Jack, and then Kevin's adopted son Ace. She is caught by the police and placed in a mental institution.

Months later, Margaret is released as her doctors decide that she has been given the help that she needed. Margaret, however, has been faking her sanity; still obsessed with Todd, she appears on his wedding day to ex-wife Blair. When he refuses to leave with her willingly, Margaret shoots both of his knees, kidnaps him, and holds him hostage in a cabin. Todd's repeated attempts to escape fail, and they are snowed in. Meanwhile, Blair and the rest of Llanview think that Todd has run off on his own. Eventually, Todd's assistant Mrs. Bigelow discovers what Margaret has done; Margaret finds Bigelow and kills her. Soon Blair realizes that Margaret must be behind Todd's disappearance and Bigelow's death; Blair tracks her to the cabin, and sneaks in to save Todd when Margaret is away. But Margaret returns unexpectedly, locking Blair in the trunk of her car.

Margaret makes it clear that she wants a child by Todd, and ultimately rapes him; he allows it to happen to keep Margaret from murdering Blair. When the pregnancy test comes back negative, Margaret is furious; she sets a bomb in the cabin and leaves Todd there to die. Todd is rescued by Kevin; Blair's ex-husband Asa Buchanan finds her in the trunk but, hating her, he puts Blair into a mental institution. Todd finds her there and the two are reunited. Margaret soon discovers that she is indeed pregnant, and returns to Llanview when she starts to show. Asa allows her to stay at his house to infuriate Todd; he finds her there and tries to strangle her. Margaret stabs him with scissors and gets away. She finds an apartment to hide out, but Todd finds her and she is on the run again. Desperate, Margaret calls her niece Ginger Foley for help; Ginger gives her some money, which Margaret uses to buy bullets and knitting supplies. Margaret and her unborn baby are soon found murdered. Todd is tried, convicted and sentenced to death for the crime; he is administered the lethal injection but revived at the very last second by his enemy Dr. Spencer Truman as proof surfaces that Margaret is alive.

Found in Thailand by David Vickers, Margaret is escorted back to Llanview by Detective John McBain and Todd's niece, Natalie Buchanan. With no memory of her time in Llanview, Margaret is first unable to recall even having a child; soon the memories come flooding back. It is revealed that Spencer had taken Margaret in, orchestrated her "murder" and framed Todd. Spencer had delivered Margaret's baby — whom she unofficially named Todd Manning, Jr. — on February 6, 2006, and had then disposed of it in a black market adoption. Margaret dies on June 15, 2006 following a van wreck, before she can reveal all the details; Blair and Spencer visit her body in the morgue on June 16, 2006.

Todd is led to believe his child with Margaret is dead, when in actuality the boy has been adopted by Llanview residents Marcie and Dr. Michael McBain and named Tommy. A conspiracy of sorts begins as people close to the McBains, and Michael himself, begin to learn the truth. Eventually Miles Laurence gives Todd proof that Spencer orchestrated the adoption of Todd's son by the McBains. Todd takes the McBains to court, and is awarded custody on October 9, 2007. Marcie escapes through a window with Tommy and flees town, and the two are pursued for months by FBI agent Lee Ramsey and Marcie's brother-in-law, Detective John McBain. With Marcie and his son still at large, Todd announces on December 20, 2007, that "Tommy" will be renamed "Sam Manning," in honor of his deceased mentor and friend, Sam Rappaport. Marcie is finally found, and Todd's son Sam is returned to him on January 14, 2008.

Back in Llanview, Blair steps into the role of stepmother to young Sam. But her subconscious doubts about loving the son of the evil Margaret Cochran temporarily manifest themselves as taunting visions of Margaret herself from January 17, 2008, to January 24, 2008. A vision of Margaret later appears to taunt a jailed Todd on December 18, 2008.
