= BethAnn Bonner =

American actress (born 1982)

- Born: October 22, 1982 (age 43)
- Years active: 2006 – present
- Spouse: Maria Fuenmayor (m. 2012)
- Children: 2

BethAnn Bonner (born October 22, 1982) is an American actress. She is known for her role as Talia Sahid on One Life to Live (December 21, 2006 – April 22, 2009) and for her most recent role as Kat on All My Children (November – December 21, 2009).

== Career ==
Bonner competed in SOAPnet's I Wanna Be a Soap Star 3 in 2006. While she did not win, later that year she was offered the contract role of police officer Talia Sahid on the ABC daytime soap opera One Life to Live. Bonner portrayed the role from December 21, 2006 to April 22, 2009.

In early 2009, Bonner appeared on the CBS soap opera Guiding Light.

In November 2009, she joined the cast of ABC's All My Children in the role of a newly created character named Kat. It was said in a December 2009 issue of Soap Opera Digest, "They're Back!" (vol. 34, No. 51, last air date shown in Comings and Goings p. 17) that Bonner's last air date is December 21, 2009. In 2010, she starred in the ABC Daytime & SOAPnet Salute Broadway Cares at The Town Hall (New York City); a benefit concert with a live symphony orchestra that raised money for the nonprofit organization Broadway Cares/Equity Fights AIDS.

== Filmography ==
Year	Film	Role	Notes
2006–2009	One Life to Live	Talia Sahid	December 21, 2006 – April 22, 2009
2009	Guiding Light	Natasha	
2009	Law & Order	Linda Cooper	
2009	New Media	Chloe Hudson	
2009	All My Children	Kat	November – December 21, 2009

== Personal life ==
Bonner is originally from Stillwater, Oklahoma where her parents live. She has two sisters, one in Chicago and one in Washington, D.C.

Bonner graduated from Emerson Performing Arts College in Boston, Massachusetts.

She married Maria Fuenmayor in October 2012 and they welcomed twins, Ruby Colette & Simon Lucas on September 22, 2015.
