= Mark Dobies =

American stage and television actor (1959–2025)

- Born: Mark Steven Dobies; April 3, 1959; Philadelphia, Pennsylvania, U.S.
- Died: March 11, 2025 (aged 65); Dunellen, New Jersey, U.S.
- Education: Delaware Valley University
- Occupation: Actor
- Years active: 1997–2016
- Spouse: Linda Hill (m. 1993; div. 2008)

Mark Steven Dobies (April 3, 1959 – March 11, 2025) was an American stage and television actor. He was best known for playing district attorney and serial killer Daniel Colson in the American soap opera television series One Life to Live from 2003 to 2005.

== Life and career ==
Dobies was born in Philadelphia, Pennsylvania, on April 3, 1959, the son of Suzanne Dobies. He attended Delaware Valley University on a football scholarship. He began his screen career in 1997, appearing in the drama television series Fame L.A.

Later in his career, Dobies guest-starred in television programs including Just Shoot Me!, Home Improvement, Profiler, Melrose Place, Everybody Loves Raymond, CSI: Miami, Sabrina the Teenage Witch, Gossip Girl and Nash Bridges. In addition to his guest-appearances, he played Dr. Noah Chase on Guiding Light from 2000 to 2001, and Daniel Colson on One Life to Live from 2003 to 2005. On stage, he played Bruce Niles in the 2004 off-Broadway revival of Larry Kramer’s The Normal Heart at The Public Theater.

Dobies retired from acting in 2016, last appearing in the film Greater.

== Death ==
Dobies died in Dunellen, New Jersey, on March 11, 2025, at the age of 65.
