= Tari Signor =

American actress

Tari Signor is an American actress.

== Biography ==
Born in Harrisburg, Pennsylvania, Signor has appeared off-Broadway as Juliet in Death Defying Acts (1995), as Rose in Mr. Peters' Connections (1998), as Hippolyte in Moliere's The Bungler, Troilus and Cressida (2001), and as Alison Regan in Scattergood (2003).

Signor portrayed Margaret Cochran on the daytime soap opera One Life to Live in 2004 and 2005, and made extended appearances in 2006. Signor made two appearances on the show in 2008, on January 17 and December 18.

Signor's other television credits include Law & Order: Criminal Intent and Third Watch. She also has been featured in commercials for products such as 7Up and Midol.

Signor's feature film credits include Rudy Blue and The Doghouse.

== Filmography ==
=== Television ===
- A Deadly Vision (1997)
- Law & Order: Criminal Intent (2004), 1 episode
- Third Watch (2004), 1 episode
- Law & Order (2007), 1 episode
- One Life to Live (2005-2008)

=== Film ===
- Thanksgiving (1990)
- Rudy Blue (1999)
- The Doghouse (2000)

=== Theater ===
- Richard II (1993)
- Death Defying Acts (1995)
- Search for Meaning (1998)
- A Woman of No Importance (1998)
- Twelfth Night (1999)
- The Bungler (2000)
- Troilus and Cressida (2001)
- Scattergood (2003)
