= List of One Life to Live characters introduced in the 2000s =

This is a list of notable characters from the ABC soap opera One Life to Live that made their first appearance between 2000 and 2009.

== Kimberly Andrews ==
Kimberly Andrews
- One Life to Live character
- Portrayed by: Amanda Setton
- Duration: 2009–11
- First appearance: August 14, 2009
- Last appearance: December 29, 2011
- Created by: Ron Carlivati
- Introduced by: Frank Valentini
In-universe information
- Other names: Aubrey Wentworth; Kimberly Buchanan; Gigi
- Occupation: Stripper; Executive assistant Con artist
- Parents: William J. Wentworth Jr. Alex Olanov
- Siblings: Cutter Wentworth
- Spouse: Clint Buchanan (2010)

Kimberly Andrews (born Aubrey Wentworth) is a fictional character on the American soap opera, One Life to Live. Amanda Setton originated the role on August 14, 2009, and last appeared on April 2, 2010. Setton reprised the role from August 22, 2011, until December 29, 2011.

Kimberly Andrews is an exotic dancer who arrives in Llanview in August 2009 to help her best friend, Stacy Morasco. Stacy had miscarried her baby with Rex Balsom, and Kim conspires to help Stacy get pregnant again and pass the child off as Rex's. Running low on money, Kim sets her sights on Clint Buchanan. Kim manipulates her way into a position as Clint's executive assistant and soon finds out that Clint's wife Nora Buchanan has fallen back in love with her ex-husband, Bo Buchanan. In December, Kim arranges for Clint to discover the truth. Clint files for divorce and invites Kim to live at the mansion. Kim is devastated when Stacy falls into a frozen lake and is presumed dead. Kim and Clint marry in March 2010 so she can get custody of Stacy's baby. Kim is blackmailed by David Vickers into leaving Llanview in April 2010.

Kim later turns up at The Spotted Pony strip club in Anchorage, Kentucky in August 2011 and is spotted by Rex. She is then seen with an unknown woman who is later revealed to be Stacy. Clint is happy to see Kim again. In September, it is revealed that Kim is Cutter Wentworth's real sister, and that her real name is Aubrey Wentworth. She finds out that her brother was inspired to scam the Buchanan family after he read about Kim's marriage to Clint in the newspaper. She later comes face to face with Cutter's girlfriend, Christine Karr, who had been passing herself off as Aubrey Wentworth. Kim blackmails Rex's biological mother, Echo DiSavoy, to convince her son to return the Buchanan fortune to Clint so she can pay her friend's medical bills.

In September 2011, it is revealed that Kim's friend in the hospital is Stacy. Meanwhile, Cutter learns of Kim's plan, but she convinces him to let her continue to blackmail Echo. Kim tells Stacy that she got Echo to forge Rex's signature. It is also revealed that Stacy had plastic surgery to look like her sister Gigi. Cutter blackmails Kim to give him the forged documents. Kim reveals to Stacy what had happened several years ago at the Spotted Pony: Cutter had enlisted Kim to seduce a rich man, but Cutter put too many drugs into his drink, which caused the man to die. Cutter frames Kim for the murder of Berger. Kim begs Cutter to take care of Stacy while she's in jail.

Rex and Aubrey confront Kim in prison in December 2011 about Stacy being alive. Kim agrees to help them if they can get her released from prison, which they do. Kim tells Clint that Cutter is her brother, that her real name is Aubrey Wentworth, and that her friend in the Kentucky hospital is Stacy. Soon after, Kim receives a call from Cutter, who tells Kim to help him break out of prison. He also tells her that it was Gigi, not Stacy, whom she rescued, and that Stacy died from carbon monoxide poisoning. Cutter also tells Kim that he found their estranged mother, Alex Olanov, in Rio de Janeiro. Kim declines.

== Hunter Atwood ==
Hunter Atwood
- One Life to Live character
- Portrayed by: Zach Roerig
- First appearance: June 11, 2007
- Last appearance: August 8, 2007
- Created by: Dena Higley and Ron Carlivati
- Introduced by: Frank Valentini
In-universe information
- Occupation: Con artist

Hunter Atwood is a fictional character on the American soap opera, One Life to Live. He was portrayed by Zach Roerig from June 11, 2007, until August 8, 2007.

In June 2007, it is revealed that Todd Manning is being held captive by Hunter in Chicago. Hunter's girlfriend Sarah Roberts, who is also Todd's niece, recognizes her uncle and makes an anonymous call to let Todd's ex-wife, Blair Cramer, know where he is. In the meantime, Hunter brings Todd to Llanview and drops him at the doorstep of the man who had originally paid him: Miles Laurence.

Sarah cooperates with the police to find Hunter and Todd. Hunter threatens Sarah for betraying him. Rex offers to broker a deal for Todd's return, assuring Hunter that Blair will pay well for Todd. Hunter rejects the offer, but soon goes to Blair himself. In exchange for several thousand dollars, he gives her the address where he left Todd. Blair recognizes it as the residence of Marty Saybrooke, who had recently married Miles.

Miles keeps an unconscious, wounded Todd in a storage room, but soon dumps Todd outside to avoid being caught with him. Todd manages to get his hands on a cell phone and call Blair, but Hunter appears and knocks him unconscious. He calls Miles and offers to dispose of Todd for a fee, but Blair and John McBain find Todd first. In the end, Hunter is killed in self-defense by Cristian Vega.

== Charlie Banks ==
Charlie Banks
- One Life to Live character
- Portrayed by: Brian Kerwin
- Duration: 2007–11
- First appearance: October 25, 2007
- Last appearance: December 13, 2011
- Created by: Ron Carlivati
- Introduced by: Frank Valentini
In-universe information
- Other names: Charlie B. (Alcoholics Anonymous)
- Occupation: Architect
- Wife: Valerie Banks (pre-2007); Victoria Lord (2009–11)
- Sons: Jared Banks; Jimmy Banks

Charlie Banks was portrayed by Brian Kerwin from October 25, 2007, to May 11, 2011. He re-appeared on December 12 and 13, 2011, when Viki returned to Paris, Texas.

Charlie comes into the Bon Jour Café in Paris, Texas, in October 2007. He befriends his waitress, Victoria "Viki" Lord Davidson, and asks her out. Charlie and Viki have a date at the local drive-in. A recovering alcoholic, Charlie is looking for his son to make amends. He gets a lead and heads to the nearby Buchanan Ranch, where the Buchanans are assembling for the reading of patriarch Asa's will. Charlie is unaware that Clint Buchanan is actually Viki's ex-husband, and that her daughters are at the ranch too. By the time Charlie arrives, his son Jared has returned to Llanview, Pennsylvania. Charlie discovers an injured Dorian Lord in the bushes and follows her home to Llanview to find Jared.

Charlie ends up at Nash Brennan's vineyard, where Jared had been living, and learns that Jared is now residing at the Buchanan mansion. Nash makes no attempt to hide his disdain for Jared but wishes Charlie luck. Charlie interrupts the Buchanans as butler Nigel Bartholomew-Smythe falsely reveals that Jared is Asa's son. Once Jared steps outside to greet his visitor, he is unpleasantly surprised to see that it is Charlie. Jared berates Charlie for his past alcohol abuse and for the way Charlie had treated him and his mother. Jared then informs Charlie that he wants nothing to do with him. Dorian eavesdrops on the entire conversation.

Charlie is devastated by Jared's apparent hatred of him and falls off the wagon, drowning his sorrows at Rodi's Bar. He finds a drinking buddy in troubled Dr. Michael McBain, whose wife Marcie is on the run from the police. Charlie ends up spending the night at Michael's apartment. Michael learns from Charlie that Marcie had been in Paris, Texas, and the two fly down to Paris. Charlie continues to drown his sorrows and shows up at the Bon Jour Café drunk. Unsure of how to handle the situation, waitress Gigi Morasco calls Viki for help. Viki flies back to Paris and convinces Charlie that the fight for sobriety is worthwhile.

Charlie commits himself to protecting Jared by hiding his identity as Jared's father from everyone, including Viki. Dorian, however, knows the truth and promises to keep the secret. Caught off guard after meeting Roxy Balsom, Charlie tells Rex Balsom and Adriana Cramer that his last name is Balsom, not realizing that Rex is Roxy's son. When Rex's investigation into his own background puts his paternity in question, Roxy claims that Charlie is his father to keep him from looking into his background. She begs Charlie to go along with the ruse, suggesting that the truth of Rex's parentage is worse than any lie she could tell. A compassionate Charlie agrees, but is later guilty as he is forced to lie to Viki as well.

On February 15, 2008, Jared indicates that he has at least one sibling when he relates to Charlie the abuse they and their mother had suffered at the hands of her boyfriend after Charlie had left them. On March 21, 2008, Jared and Charlie discuss how during that time Jared's younger brother, Jimmy, had been hit by a car and killed. Though Valerie had told Charlie that it had been an accident, Jared reveals that Jimmy had actually been overwrought because of their mother's abusive boyfriend. Jared blames himself for letting an upset Jimmy run out into the street.

On December 1, 2008, Charlie reveals that he had rebuilt Carlotta's diner, which had burnt down earlier in the year, in the image of the Bon Jour Cafe, naming it the Buenos Dias. Charlie marries Viki on August 4, 2009. Their happiness is short lived, however, when Jared is murdered by Mitch Lawrence. Unable to cope, he starts drinking again and pushes Viki away. In March 2011, Charlie starts an affair with Echo DiSavoy. In April 2011, Viki goes to Echo's apartment and barges in on Charlie and Echo in bed. Charlie admits that the affair has lasted a month. When Viki asks if he loves Echo, Charlie hesitates, and Viki storms off. On April 12, Viki asks Charlie again whether or not he loves Echo; he says he does. Viki files for divorce. Charlie learns of Echo's lies and ends their relationship. Charlie learns that the Bon Jour Cafe was destroyed and wants to help rebuild it. On May 11, 2011, Charlie apologizes to Viki and the two part. Charlie returns to Texas and Viki goes to see Clint.

When Viki goes back to Texas for a pie contest, she and Charlie run into each other as Viki again becomes a waitress. Though awkward at first, Charlie apologizes for the failures in their marriage, and they reconcile a friendship. Charlie tries to understand why Viki is in Texas again. When he accuses her of running away from her problems, she protests but soon divulges her feelings for Clint and how she feels like a consolation prize in contrast to Kim Andrews, Clint's younger ex-wife. Charlie shocks Viki by revealing that, despite the love they once had for each other, he always knew Viki belonged with Clint, and that they both still love each other, citing how Clint has and will always be a big part of Viki's life. He encourages her to go after him, prove she is Clint's first prize, and win him back.

== Bree Brennan ==
Bree Brennan
- One Life to Live character
- Portrayed by: Stephanie Schmahl (2008–11); (and others)
- Duration: 2006–11
- First appearance: May 1, 2006
- Last appearance: November 23, 2011
- Created by: Dena Higley
- Introduced by: Frank Valentini
In-universe information
- Family: Lord; Buchanan
- Parents: Nash Brennan; Jessica Buchanan
- Half-brothers: Ryder Ford
- Grandparents: Phil Brennan; Cindy Brennan; Clint Buchanan; Victoria Lord
- Aunts and uncles: Cord Roberts; Megan Gordon; Kevin Buchanan; Joey Buchanan; Natalie Buchanan; Rex Balsom
- First cousins: David Vickers Buchanan; Brian Kendall; Daniel Wolek; Drew Buchanan; C. J. Roberts; Sarah Roberts; Duke Buchanan; Starr Manning; Danielle Manning; Jack Manning; Matthew Buchanan; Shane Balsom; Sam Manning; Liam McBain

Bree Victoria Brennan (born Brennan Buchanan) is a fictional character on the American soap opera, One Life to Live. Bree was portrayed by various child actors from December 9, 2008, until November 23, 2011.

Bree is the daughter of Jessica Buchanan and Nash Brennan. Jessica meets Nash in 2005 while she is struggling with dissociative identity disorder and under the influence of an alternate personality named Tess. Jessica becomes pregnant and at first is not sure if the father is Nash or Antonio Vega. The baby, born on-screen on May 1, 2006, is revealed to be Nash's daughter and is named Brennan Buchanan. Jessica later nicknames her Bree.

== Jonas Chamberlain ==
Jonas Chamberlain
- One Life to Live character
- Portrayed by: Kevin Spirtas
- First appearance: June 11, 2008
- Last appearance: August 28, 2008
- Created by: Ron Carlivati
- Introduced by: Frank Valentini
In-universe information
- Occupation: Mendorran Ambassador to the United States
- Spouse: Talia Sahid (2008)

Jonas Byron Chamberlain, (Note: Jonas' middle name, Byron, is noted during his wedding to Talia Sahid in the July 31, 2008 episode.) is a fictional character on the American soap opera, One Life to Live. Kevin Spirtas portrayed the role on a recurring status from June 11, 2008, until August 28, 2008.

Jonas Chamberlain, Ambassador to the U.S. from the European principality of Mendorra, welcomes the Mendorran Crown Princess, Tina Lord, to Llanview after the Mendorran Crown Jewels are stolen. Tina acquires the jewels from Police Commissioner Lee Ramsey, but Ramsey is shot and killed, and Tina goes on the run with the jewels from Jonas, who wants them for himself. Tina finds refuge with her daughter, Sarah Roberts, and Sarah's boyfriend, Cristian Vega. Talia Sahid inexplicably aids Jonas in kidnapping Sarah, and soon Cristian and Antonio Vega discover that Jonas has taken both women to Mendorra. Antonio, Cristian, and Tina agree to travel to Mendorra in order to exchange Sarah and Talia for the Crown Jewels.

In Mendorra, Carlo Hesser, the real mastermind behind the kidnappings, is revealed to be Talia's estranged father. Carlo, bent on revenge, announces publicly that she and the Crown Prince (Cain Rogan in disguise) are frauds, and reveals that Jonas is the true heir to the throne. Carlo intends to marry Talia to Jonas; she protests and stalls, but goes through with the wedding in order to save Antonio and her friends from harm, not knowing that Jonas has already stabbed Antonio and left him for dead. A wounded Antonio overpowers Jonas and the guards and leads Talia to safety, but Carlo, Jonas, and their men catch up. Talia brokers a deal with Carlo: she will stay in Mendorra if the others are allowed to leave. A furious Antonio is forced to leave Talia behind. Antonio, Sarah, and Cristian later return; they drug Carlo and Jonas and stage them in bed together, and Talia leads a team of reporters to discover the scene. Talia and the others leave Mendorra as Carlo and Jonas are arrested for fraud.

== Elijah Clarke ==
Elijah Clarke
- One Life to Live character
- Portrayed by: Matt Walton
- Duration: 2009–10
- First appearance: August 7, 2009
- Last appearance: October 26, 2010
- Created by: Ron Carlivati
- Introduced by: Frank Valentini
In-universe information
- Other names: Elijah Rayburn; Bennett Thompson; Craig Pattison
- Occupation: Lawyer
- Siblings: Ross Rayburn
- Spouse: Olivia Thompson (pre-2009); Blair Cramer (2010)

Elijah Clarke (born Elijah Clarke Rayburn) is a fictional character on the American soap opera, One Life to Live. He was portrayed by Matt Walton from August 7, 2009, through October 26, 2010.

Eli Clarke first appears in Llanview in August 2009, when Nora and Bo Buchanan hire him to represent them in a lawsuit filed by their son, Matthew. He shares a brief flirtation with Téa Delgado, but her heart belongs to Todd Manning. Blair Cramer decides that she and Eli could console each other and the two begin a relationship. Eli expresses jealousy over Blair's relationship with Todd. After a day in court, Téa faints and Eli takes her to the hospital. Eli later discovers that Téa has been diagnosed with an inoperable brain tumor. Eli agrees not to say anything to Téa, who believes that only Blair knows about her tumor. Blair later confesses that Eli is aware of Téa's illness and he tells Téa that he will do anything to help her through her ordeal.

In August, Blair and Eli travel to Tahiti to get married. After the ceremony, Kelly Cramer calls Blair and convinces her that she has proof that Eli is the same person as Bennett Thompson and Craig Pattison, and that he had killed his first wife, Olivia, and his second wife, Melinda Cramer. Kelly tells Blair that John McBain has a warrant for Eli's arrest. Blair confronts Eli, who at first denies everything and claims that his brother, Ross Rayburn, was the one responsible for all of the crimes. Refusing to believe his lies, Blair pulls a gun on Eli and demands that he tell her the truth. Eli confesses to everything, including pushing Marty Saybrooke down a flight of stairs, which caused her to have a miscarriage. Eli tries to convince Blair that they belong together. Just as Blair is about to let her guard down, Eli tries to take the gun from her. Suddenly, Blair shoots Eli, who collapses. A devastated Blair is in shock as Ross' house catches on fire, and she tries without success to rouse Eli and save him from the burning building. John rescues Blair, but is unable to rescue Eli. The Tahitian police confirm that Eli is dead. A week later, it is revealed that it was staged. Eli is later found on Saint Kitts at the hospice where Téa is being treated. Greg Evans falsely diagnoses Eli with a hematoma and recommends surgery, but this is just an excuse for Greg to get Eli on the operating table so he can kill him. Eli knows that Greg is lying and escapes to Llanview.

Ross finds Eli at the docks to tell him that he got custody of Danielle, but that she has run away. Eli shoots and kills Ross and dumps his body in the water. Todd arrives and shoots Eli, but he escapes. Eli then kidnaps Starr Manning, Hope, and Dani. Starr manages to escape, and he kidnaps Téa. He demands a ransom from Todd. Todd goes to do the exchange, but Eli changes the rules and demands that Blair come with Todd. Eli admits that he had the warehouse rigged with explosives, and blows it up. Eli is arrested and put into police custody. Cole Thornhart is taunted by Eli, who shoots and kills Eli.

== Daniel Colson ==
Daniel Colson
- One Life to Live character
- Portrayed by: Mark Dobies
- Duration: 2003–05
- First appearance: July 1, 2003
- Last appearance: June 15, 2005
- Crossover appearances: All My Children
In-universe information
- Other names: Theodore Daniel Colson Jr. (birth name)
- Occupation: Lawyer: District Attorney
- Family: Colson
- Parents: Theodore Colson Sr.
- Spouse: Nora Hanen (2005)
- Sons: Riley Colson

Daniel Colson is a fictional character on the American soap opera, One Life to Live. Mark Dobies played the role from July 2003 until June 2005.

District Attorney Daniel Colson marries Nora Buchanan in 2005, who soon suspects he is having an affair. He is soon revealed as Paul Cramer's murderer; Paul had been blackmailing Daniel with the secret of Daniel's homosexuality. Daniel had been having an affair with student Mark Solomon. Daniel first frames Jennifer Rappaport for the crime, and then suffocates her when she learns the truth. Daniel is ultimately caught and sent to prison.

=== Reception ===
"The reaction, even at the Emmys, has been amazing. I know people are having trouble with this story. But that's exactly why it's important for us to tell it."

— Hillary B. Smith (Nora Buchanan) on Daniel's outing story arc

Daniel's controversial storyline was compared to former New Jersey Governor, James McGreevy, to which Headwriter Dena Higley attributed the character's inspiration. The portrayal of a homicidal gay character garnered backlash from the Gay & Lesbian Alliance Against Defamation (GLAAD), who claimed it reinforced negative stereotypes. GLAAD had recently honored One Life to Live with a 2004 GLAAD Media Award for Mark Solomon's coming out storyline. The organization reached out directly to Executive Producer, Frank Valentini, who responded, "The anger is understandable, but everyone needs to watch all of it. This is a story about the harsher side of intolerance and about one man not being true to himself. There are going to be meaningful, frank discussions that come out of this." Higley added,"Daniel is not the first gay character on 'OLTL.' If he had been, I would have felt a different responsibility. But writing a political ambitious character who is deep in the closet and who murders as a result is something that hasn't been explored before on daytime." While some groups shared in GLAAD's criticism, such as TV Guide, others were supportive. Hillary B. Smith, who played Daniel's wife Nora, explained that support groups such as Straight Spouse Network praised the story for bringing attention to those women who are dealing with their husbands identifying as gay.

== Riley Colson ==
Riley Colson
- One Life to Live character
- Portrayed by: Jay Wilkison
- Duration: 2003–05
- First appearance: February 24, 2003
- Last appearance: June 8, 2005
- Created by: Josh Griffith
- Introduced by: Frank Valentini
In-universe information
- Occupation: Musician
- Family: Colson
- Parents: Daniel Colson
- Stepparents: Nora Hanen
- Grandparents: Theodore Colson Sr.

Riley Colson is a fictional character on the American soap opera, One Life to Live. Jay Wilkison played the role, originally supposed to be only eight episodes, from February 24, 2003, until June 8, 2005.

Riley Colson arrives in Llanview in February 2003 as the boyfriend and bandmate of Sarah Roberts. He has a somewhat volatile relationship with his father, District Attorney Daniel Colson. Riley had been named for Victoria Lord Davidson's first husband, reporter Joe Riley, whom Riley's mother had admired. In the summer of 2004, Riley becomes involved with Jennifer Rappaport.

In 2005, Daniel marries Nora Buchanan and is soon revealed as Paul Cramer's murderer; Paul had been blackmailing Daniel with the secret of Daniel's homosexuality. Daniel first frames Jennifer for the crime, and then strangles her to death in 2005 when she learns the truth. Daniel is ultimately caught and brought to justice. After the fallout of Jennifer's death and Daniel's crimes, Riley returns to using drugs, and is arrested for dealing. He shares a sad goodbye with his stepmother Nora and leaves town to go to a drug rehabilitation center.

== Wes Granger ==
Wes Granger
- One Life to Live character
- Portrayed by: Justin Paul Kahn
- Duration: 2008–09
- First appearance: September 25, 2008
- Last appearance: March 20, 2009
- Created by: Ron Carlivati
- Introduced by: Frank Valentini
In-universe information
- Occupation: Navy SEAL

Wes Granger is a fictional character on the American soap opera, One Life to Live. Justin Paul Kahn played the role from September 25, 2008, until February 18, 2009.

Wes Granger first appears in September 2008 when Rex Balsom and Gigi Morasco contact him for information on his best friend Brody Lovett. A former Navy SEAL who had done several tours in Iraq and Afghanistan, Wes had served with Brody, and had witnessed the friendly fire incident that triggered Brody's posttraumatic stress disorder. Wes helps find Brody, who has made off with Gigi's son Shane Morasco. After Brody is committed to St. Ann's Sanitarium, Wes comes to Llanview and becomes a frequent visitor during Brody's convalescence. As Brody undergoes therapy, Wes urges him not to delve deeper into the mystery, but ultimately admits that the Iraqi had been unarmed, and Wes had planted a weapon on him to protect Brody.

Wes forms a friendship with the troubled amnesiac Marty Saybrooke. Marty stays with Wes in a platonic arrangement, and her son Cole Thornhart and former love interest John McBain become concerned that she has taken up with a questionable stranger. Wes is shocked to discover that the key witness in a local trial is Lee Halpern, a woman who he thought had been killed 20 years before. Con artist Lee had seduced Wes' father and swindled him, leaving the Grangers penniless and fatherless. Wes is hungry for revenge, and when Lee is later found stabbed to death, John suspects him of the crime. Wes maintains his innocence, but even Marty is unsure whether or not to believe him. Falling asleep next to Wes drunk, Marty wakes up on February 16, 2009, to find him stabbed to death. With no memory of the night before and covered in his blood, Marty is arrested for Wes' murder when her fingerprints are found on the knife. Powell Lord III later confesses to the murder (among others), as part of his plan to punish anyone who has hurt Marty, frame Todd, and then punish him by killing him and anyone he loves.

In 2011, Jessica Buchanan, who met Wes a few times during her stay in St. Ann's, develops an alternate personality based on memories of him and stories she heard from Brody. Unlike Jessica's other alters, "Wes" seems to believe that "he" actually is Wes Granger rather than a part of Jessica's psyche.

== Tate Harmon ==
Tate Harmon
- One Life to Live character
- Portrayed by: Chris Beetem
- First appearance: February 8, 2007
- Last appearance: August 9, 2007
- Introduced by: Frank Valentini
In-universe information
- Occupation: Baseball player Model

Tate Harmon is a fictional character on the American soap opera, One Life to Live. Chris Beetem portrayed the role from February 8, 2007, until August 9, 2007. In 2007, Beetem as Tate won Worst Villain from Soap Opera Digest.

Tate Harmon is a well-known, young, retired professional baseball player. An anti-drug lecturer, Tate comes to Llanview in February 2007 and speaks out against steroid use at Llanview High School. He is soon hired by entrepreneurs Adriana Cramer and Layla Williamson to be the model for their new men's underwear line. Tate's romantic interest in Adriana invites the ire of her boyfriend, Rex Balsom. On April 23, 2007, Tate is a guest on the daytime talk show The View and declares his love for Adriana in a "Tom Cruise-like" couch incident. After meeting Tate's ex-wife, who claims their marriage ended due to "fraud" on Tate's part, Rex outs Tate as gay on local television; the story is soon picked up nationwide.

Rex's assertion is soon proven untrue, but Tate hides another secret: he is a member of the white supremacist group "One Pure People." Using half-Latin Adriana as a cover, Tate has been participating in OPP's recent anti-semitic and racially motivated arsons in Llanview. Tate's father Kirk Harmon comes to town and soon takes the blame for the crimes to protect his son, but when Kirk realizes that Tate will not stop his misguided crusade, Kirk decides to tell the truth to the police. Before he has the chance, Kirk is killed in prison by an OPP member, but Rex, Adriana and the police ultimately deduce that Tate is the culprit. In a macabre endgame, Tate traps Adriana, Layla, and Vincent Jones on a rooftop, intending to kill them for their racial "impurity." Rex arrives, and Tate convinces Adriana to jump off of the roof to spare the lives of her friends. Tipped off to Tate's whereabouts, Officer Talia Sahid shoots and arrests him before Adriana jumps or anyone else is harmed. Tate is convicted for his crimes and is sent to Statesville Prison on August 9, 2007; to his dismay, his cellmate is an African American named Luther.

== Stephen Haver ==
Stephen Haver
- One Life to Live character
- Portrayed by: Matthew Ashford
- Duration: 2003–04
- First appearance: December 10, 2003
- Last appearance: March 22, 2004
- Created by: Josh Griffith; Michael Malone
- Introduced by: Frank Valentini
In-universe information
- Other names: Love Child Killer; White Rose Killer; Music Box Killer
- Occupation: Professor at Llanview University
- Parents: Marlena Haver
- Siblings: Kenneth Haver

Dr. Stephen Haver is a fictional character on the American soap opera, One Life to Live. Matthew Ashford portrayed the role from December 10, 2003, until March 22, 2004.

Stephen Haver is a psychology professor at Llanview University who specializes in human sexuality and researches serial killers and sexual predators. He becomes a favorite instructor of Jessica Buchanan, who recruits him along with psychiatrist Rae Cummings and student activist and radio host Marcie Walsh to help her expose a scandal between her friend and another professor who had demanded sex in return for a passing grade. When the serial killer known as the Music Box Killer begins terrorizing the university, Jessica and Dr. Haver investigate, with Haver and Rae acting as psychological profilers for the Llanview Police Department. Haver works closely with new Chief of Detectives John McBain, but no one is aware that Haver is actually the Music Box Killer.

The Music Box Killer strangles his victims, paints a teardrop on their faces, and leaves a music box by their bodies as a calling card. He sometimes targets women at random, such as private investigator Elyssa Collins or sorority girl Madison Kensington, but seems to focus on women who are either older and maternal, or promiscuous and involved in sex work, like Jennifer Rappaport or her friend Karen Reeder, a local prostitute. In reality, Haver is murdering women whom he identifies with his mother, a promiscuous, alcoholic dancer and folk singer from the "free love" era of the 1960s. For a time, Haver uses psychotic mental patient Troy MacIver as his alibi; as MacIver's therapist at St. Ann's Sanitarium, Haver releases the man from the institution at the times when he plans to kill. As the authorities get closer, Haver kills Gabrielle Medina, and nearly kills Sarah Roberts. Meanwhile, John McBain grows increasingly suspicious of Haver, who becomes his prime suspect in the case. Jessica angrily defends her teacher to McBain, but when she stumbles upon the truth, Haver is forced to take action. He kidnaps Jessica, and brainwashes her to conceal his crimes. In the meantime, Rae Cummings also deduces Haver's secret; he takes her hostage, forcing her to act out his twisted psychological ritual of posing as his mother before apparently strangling her and then immolating her isolated prison.

The LPD discovers Jessica's brainwashing and rehabilitates her, but they still have no actionable proof of Haver's guilt. As John McBain digs deeper into Haver's past, he discovers that Haver has actually posed as many serial killers in many different parts of the United States, changing methodology and modus operandi each time to avoid detection. John is shocked to learn that Haver was once the White Rose Killer, whom he had hunted unsuccessfully during his tenure with the FBI; and who had murdered McBain's fiancée, Caitlin Fitzgerald.

Trapped and growing desperate, Haver abducts Jessica's sister, Natalie Buchanan, to whom John has become romantically linked. In a stand-off with police, Haver straps a bomb to Natalie's body and threatens to kill her. Haver is shocked as Rae Cummings suddenly enters the room. She had survived his assault and had been kept in police protection. Taunting Haver with the memory of his mother, Rae manages to distract Haver long enough for the police to subdue him. While behind bars and awaiting trial, Haver is shot and killed by a rogue cop. It is revealed that Haver brainwashed the cop to shoot him and then commit suicide, in the hopes of framing John for Haver's murder. The rogue cop had implicated John as an accomplice in his suicide note; this plan does not succeed.

== Hugh Hughes ==
Hugh Hughes
- One Life to Live character
- Portrayed by: Josh Casaubon
- Duration: 2005–06
- First appearance: July 18, 2005
- Last appearance: September 21, 2006
- Created by: Dena Higley
- Introduced by: Frank Valentini
In-universe information
- Occupation: Asst. District Attorney
- Parents: Spencer Truman; Paige Miller
- Grandparents: Ned Truman; Emma Bradley
- Aunts and uncles: David Vickers Buchanan

Hugh Hughes is a fictional character on the American soap opera, One Life to Live. Josh Casaubon played the role from July 18, 2005, until September 21, 2006.

Hugh comes to Llanview as the new Assistant District Attorney. He soon runs into Marcie Walsh, who is being ridiculed by other writers after her novel, The Killing Club, had been played out by a serial killer. He gives up his evening to take the drunken Marcie home, beginning an unusual friendship between the two, much to the annoyance of her ex-boyfriend, Michael McBain.

Hugh is soon thrown into the seat of district attorney when Nora Hanen is hospitalized. His first big case is the trial of Todd Manning for the murder of Margaret Cochran. Todd is convicted, but when it is discovered that Todd had been innocent, Hugh immediately apologizes to him for having been the one to put him in prison. Hugh then discovers that Spencer Truman and Paige Miller are his biological parents; Paige had put him up for adoption without telling Spencer that she was pregnant. At Spencer's bail hearing for Margaret Cochran's murder, it appears as if Hugh wants Spencer to go free when he agrees to a $1 million bail. However, he and John McBain had planned it in the hopes that Truman would lead them to the gun that he used to kill John's father, Thomas McBain.

Hugh is killed on September 22, 2006, in a car accident, but in a case of mistaken identity, he is thought to have survived and is bandaged for his burns. In reality, it is John McBain, who had also been in the accident, under the bandages while Hugh is buried in what everyone thought was John's grave.

== Britney Jennings ==
Britney Jennings
- One Life to Live character
- Portrayed by: Katrina Bowden (2006); Portia Reiners (2006–07)
- Duration: 2006–07
- First appearance: September 26, 2006
- Last appearance: October 17, 2007
- Created by: Dena Higley
- Introduced by: Frank Valentini
In-universe information
- Occupation: Student

Britney Jennings is a fictional character on the American soap opera, One Life to Live. The role was portrayed by Katrina Bowden from September 26 until October 4, 2006, and by Portia Reiners from October 10, 2006, until October 17, 2007.

Britney is a popular girl at Llanview High School who bullies Starr Manning after an argument between their fathers. Britney's attitude toward Starr worsens when Britney sets her sights on football player Cole Thornhart, who is developing feelings for Starr. Trying everything to thwart Starr and Cole's new relationship, Britney discovers that Cole had been pressured into taking steroids, and tricks him into a fit of "roid rage" during which he attacks Starr. Britney, posing as Starr, calls the police. In the aftermath, it is revealed that Cole's parents are Marty Saybrooke and the deceased Patrick Thornhart, both enemies of Starr's father, Todd. Starr forgives Cole but her parents forbid her to date him. They secretly see each other, much to Britney's dismay, and Britney does all she can to split them up. She orchestrates the reveal that Starr and Cole have spent the night together, nearly having sex. Meanwhile, Britney uses fellow student Henry Mackler to do her homework for her. He secretly takes pills to stay awake to do both his and Britney's homework. After not having slept for two weeks, a distraught Henry steals a car. Cole gets Henry to drive back to school. However, when they arrive to find the police in the parking lot, Henry panics and drives the car into a tree. Henry, not wearing a seatbelt, is thrown from the car to his death. Starr and Langston place blame on Britney for pushing Henry to this extreme; Britney begins to see that she had wronged Henry, and feels responsible for his death.

Britney seems to turn over a new leaf, dropping her vendetta against Starr. But after Cole leaves her at the prom to be with Starr, Britney reverts to her old ways. Soon she learns that Cole is lying to Starr about her father's whereabouts; the secret comes out and strains Starr and Cole's relationship. Britney then incites an argument between Starr and teacher Marcie, which results in Marcie's temporary suspension from her job. Britney soon announces during the week of October 15, 2007 that her parents are sending her to boarding school. Before she leaves, Britney overhears that Langston has been living on her own. Britney calls Social Services, who take custody of Langston, despite Dorian Lord's protests, and put her in a group home pending assignment to a foster home.

== Vincent Jones ==
Vincent Jones
- One Life to Live character
- Portrayed by: Tobias Truvillion
- Duration: 2006–08
- First appearance: April 11, 2006
- Last appearance: August 6, 2008
- Created by: Dena Higley
- Introduced by: Frank Valentini
In-universe information
- Occupation: Businessman; Entrepreneur
- Parents: Vincent Jones, Sr.

Vincent Jones is a fictional character from the ABC Daytime soap opera, One Life to Live. He was portrayed by Tobias Truvillion from April 11, 2006, to August 6, 2008.

Vincent arrives in Llanview in 2006 to continue the business of his recently deceased father's estate. He soon finds in old friend in Shaun Evans. Natalie Buchanan soon goes to Vincent, looking for information regarding the murder of John McBain’s father. Cristian Vega also has hires Vincent as his boxing manager. Cristian does well in boxing matches until Vincent has a fight fixed between Cristian and an opponent, during which Cristian damages his hand. After he discovers the truth, Cristian fires Vincent.

Vincent dates Layla Williamson, the sister of Cristian's girlfriend, Evangeline Williamson. Upon hearing of the fight fixing, Layla breaks up with Vincent. Vincent also encounters his old college friend, Hugh Hughes. Hugh is involved in a serious car accident with John McBain; John is presumed to have died in the accident, while Hugh was believed to alive in the hospital, though severely burned and wrapped in bandages. Grieving the loss of John, Natalie impulsively kisses Vincent. Vincent tells the man in the hospital whom he believe to be Hugh about the kiss, causing the patient severe agitation. After weeks of convalescence, the man identifies himself as John McBain. Vincent tells Natalie, who is ecstatic to reunite with John.

In December 2006, one of Vincent's properties is burned down, and it is confirmed as arson. After two more properties burn, Vincent accuses Cristian, believing Cristian was looking for revenge from the boxing incident. The arsons are eventually revealed to have been committed by a white supremacist group called "One Pure People". Kirk Harmon confesses to the crimes, but only to protect his son, Tate Harmon. At this time, Vincent and Layla also attempt to reconcile.

In July 2007, Tate plans further attacks against Vincent, Layla, and Adriana Cramer. After Vincent plans a romantic dinner for himself and Layla on the rooftop of the Palace Hotel, Tate knocks Vincent out. Layla arrives and finds Vincent unconscious and tied to a chair. Adriana calls Layla, but Tate answers, ordering Adriana to come to the rooftop alone. Adriana keeps the assault from Rex Balsom and Talia Sahid, but Rex follows Adriana and Tate orders Adriana to tie him up. Talia receives a tip and rescues Vincent, Layla, Adriana, and Rex. Vincent and Layla reunite, while Tate is sent to prison.

Layla and Vincent enjoy their relationship over the next year, until Layla discovers in August 2008 that Vincent has been seeing another woman behind her back. They break up, and Vincent soon fades into the canvas and was not seen since.

== Schuyler Joplin ==
Schuyler Joplin
- One Life to Live character
- Portrayed by: Scott Clifton
- Duration: 2009–10
- First appearance: January 9, 2009
- Last appearance: April 9, 2010
- Created by: Ron Carlivati
- Introduced by: Frank Valentini
In-universe information
- Occupation: Medical student Drug counselor Biology teacher
- Family: Joplin (adoptive); Laurence; Lipschitz
- Parents: Mitch Laurence; Roxy Balsom
- Adoptive parents: Leah Joplin
- Siblings: Rex Balsom (legal)
- Grandparents: Stella Lipschitz
- Aunts and uncles: Miles Laurence; Walker Laurence; Allison Perkins (adoptive); Carl Peterson (adoptive)
- Nieces and nephews: Shane Morasco (legal)

Schuyler Joplin is a fictional character on the American soap opera, One Life to Live. Scott Clifton portrayed the role from January 9, 2009, until April 9, 2010.

Schuyler Joplin, a new Llanview High School teacher, befriends student Starr Manning in January 2009 on the heels of the suicide of his mother, Dr. Leah Joplin. In March 2009, a distraught Starr kisses Schuyler in the school hallway. She later tries to seduce him, and her ex-boyfriend Cole Thornhart becomes convinced that Schuyler is the one trying to seduce his underage student. Cole reports the incident, and Schuyler is suspended from his teaching position. Schuyler's ex-girlfriend Stacy Morasco comes to town, and he stumbles upon her plot to steal her sister Gigi's boyfriend Rex Balsom through blackmail. Stacy forces Gigi to break up with Rex, and in June 2009 Schuyler helps Gigi turn the tables on Stacy. He soon develops feelings for Gigi but refuses to tell her; when he finally does, he and Gigi grow closer. Rex and Gigi reunite, but their relationship falls apart when Stacy is revealed to be pregnant after sleeping with Rex while he and Gigi were separated. Gigi is drawn to Schuyler, and they begin a relationship; meanwhile, Schuyler determines that he is actually the father of Stacy's baby, but Stacy convinces him to keep the secret so that Gigi will not reunite with Rex. Rex learns that he is not the baby's father just as Stacy gives birth to Sierra Morasco. Stacy apparently dies soon after; Gigi breaks up with Schuyler for keeping the secret, and states her intention to challenge him for custody of Sierra.

In spring 2010, Allison Perkins shows up masquerading as a house inspector from child services at Schuyler's apartment, and later points a gun at Schuyler and then kidnaps Sierra. Schuyler goes to Statesville prison and helps Mitch Laurence escape. Meanwhile, Allison shows up at Foxy Roxy's hair salon, and then holds Roxy Balsom and Natalie Buchanan at gunpoint. Allison then takes Roxy and baby Sierra back to Kyle Lewis and Oliver Fish's apartment and holds them hostage. Then Mitch calls Allison and tells her to come down to Statesville prison and bring Sierra with her. In the medical room Schuyler gives Mitch a drug that will make his heart stop and hopes that he will die. Later Allison shows up with the baby and reveals that Mitch and Roxy are Schuyler's real parents. Years earlier, Allison had switched infants Schuyler and Rex and tried to convince Roxy that the baby she'd given birth to had died the night he was born, while she gave Schuyler to her sister, Dr. Leah Joplin, who could not conceive children of her own.

Later, Schuyler takes Allison's gun and holds Gigi at gunpoint at the cabin of Victoria "Viki" Lord Davidson, and tries to force Gigi to sleep with him. He once more says that he wants Gigi back in his life, but Rex and the police find them. He attempts to shoot Rex, blaming him for all his problems, but ends up shooting police commissioner Bo Buchanan, who is badly wounded and taken to the hospital for surgery. Brody Lovett arrests Schuyler and takes him to the police station. Everyone eventually accepts the truth and Schuyler finds out that Sierra is not his daughter, she is Oliver's child as confirmed by a DNA test which Schuyler also accepts. On April 9, 2010, Schuyler appears in court and confesses to the judge, who sends him to Statesville prison where he is to await sentencing.

== Miles Laurence ==
Miles Laurence
- One Life to Live character
- Portrayed by: David Chisum
- Duration: 2007–08
- First appearance: February 12, 2007
- Last appearance: April 22, 2008
- Created by: Dena Higley
- Introduced by: Frank Valentini
In-universe information
- Siblings: Mitch Laurence; Walker Laurence
- Spouse: Marty Saybrooke (2007)
- Nieces and nephews: Schuyler Joplin

Miles Laurence is a fictional character from ABC's daytime drama One Life to Live. He was portrayed by David Chisum from February 12, 2007, to April 22, 2008.

The deceased Spencer Truman leaves his estate to the mysterious Miles Laurence in 2007. Miles is a former patient whose face had been horribly disfigured. As an infant, Miles had been given up to a local hospital by his father upon seeing the extent of his deformities. Years later, Spencer restored Miles' face and gained Miles' friendship and loyalty. The soft-spoken Miles defends Spencer, the only friend he has ever had, to the many residents of Llanview who rightfully hate him. Miles' loyalty to Spencer makes him an enemy of Spencer's nemesis, Todd Manning.

Miles soon reveals to Jessica Buchanan that he is the brother of Mitch Laurence, Jessica's supposed biological father, and Walker Laurence. To help integrate himself into society, Miles sees psychiatrist Marty Saybrooke; he soon falls for her. Marty relinquishes him as a patient so that they can be friends, but makes it clear to Miles that she has no romantic interest in him.

Intensely sheltered with a skewed view of the world and morality, Miles is determined to "make" Marty love him. Miles arranges for three men to attack Marty so that he can come to her rescue, and he later blackmails her into marrying him with her taped confession to Spencer's murder. After Todd is stabbed and kidnapped, it is revealed that Miles had paid a young man named Hunter Atwood to do the deed, both to protect Spencer's secret (that Todd's son with Margaret Cochran was adopted by Michael and Marcie McBain) and to make Todd pay for his vicious rape of Marty years before. When Hunter leaves an unconscious Todd on his doorstep, Miles hides Todd in a storage room and then dumps him outside, but not before Marty's son Cole Thornhart discovers him. Miles compels Cole to keep his secret to protect Marty from arrest for Spencer's murder, but Cole and Marty soon admit what they know to the police. Miles is arrested, and Todd is later found alive.

Miles gains an unlikely friend in Natalie Buchanan, who sympathizes with his outcast status and his naiveté. Natalie stays by Miles' side as he faces charges for his blackmail and coercion of Marty. Miles publicly admits his wrongdoing and apologizes to Marty. Todd, however, is outraged that Miles is not charged for his assault and abduction. When Miles learns that Tommy McBain is Todd's missing son, he tells Todd, inciting a fierce custody battle between Todd and the McBains.

Miles becomes good friends with Roxy Balsom as the two perform community service together. When Marty and Cole go missing in November 2007, Miles is initially a suspect but is quickly cleared. Miles is devastated to hear that Marty has been killed in an explosion. On the docks, Miles stumbles upon a distraught Cole holding a gun to FBI agent Lee Ramsey, whom Cole blames for his mother's death. Cole accidentally shoots Miles, who falls into the water. Cole and Ramsey panic and flee the scene as Detective John McBain, also present at the scene, dives into the water to rescue Miles.

Miles is rushed to the hospital. Natalie is notified and arrives to see Miles off as he is rushed into surgery. While in recovery, Roxy declares her love to a sedated Miles. After the surgery, Miles was soon dropped off the canvas and has not been seen or heard from since.

== Kyle Lewis ==
Kyle Lewis
- One Life to Live character
- Portrayed by: Brett Claywell
- Duration: 2009–10
- First appearance: February 24, 2009
- Last appearance: April 16, 2010
- Created by: Ron Carlivati
- Introduced by: Frank Valentini
In-universe information
- Occupation: Laboratory technician
- Siblings: Rebecca Lewis

Kyle Lewis is a fictional character on the American soap opera, One Life to Live. Brett Claywell portrayed the role from February 24, 2009, until April 16, 2010.

== Brody Lovett ==
Brody Lovett
- One Life to Live character
- Portrayed by: Mark Lawson
- Duration: 2008–12
- First appearance: April 24, 2008
- Last appearance: January 13, 2012
- Created by: Gary Tomlin
- Introduced by: Frank Valentini
In-universe information
- Occupation: U.S. Naval Officer (2012–); Police officer with the Llanview Police Department (2009–11); Bartender at Rodi's (2008–09); U.S. Navy SEAL in the Second Iraq War (pre-2008)
- Siblings: Nadine Lovett
- Grandparents: Ryder Lovett

Brody Lovett is a fictional character on the ABC soap opera One Life to Live, portrayed by Mark Lawson from April 24, 2008, to January 13, 2012, when the series ended.

Brody is a former Navy SEAL brought to Llanview by Adriana Cramer to distract Gigi Morasco from Adriana's fiancé Rex Balsom. A hardened veteran of the war in Iraq, Brody had been "stop-lossed" several times during his tours of duty.

Gigi establishes in 2007 that Brody, the father of her son Shane, had died heroically overseas while she was still pregnant. Threatened by Gigi's connection to her high school sweetheart Rex, Adriana sends her mother Dorian Lord to get information on the deceased Brody in 2008. Meeting Brody's sister Nadine, Dorian discovers that Brody is in fact alive; disapproving of the match, Brody's mother had told Gigi he had died, and had told Brody that Gigi had moved on to another man. Further, Adriana's suspicions that Gigi had already been pregnant when she had met Brody — and that Rex is most likely Shane's father — are confirmed. She is even more discouraged to discover that Brody and Gigi's relationship was platonic, despite Brody's willingness to give her son a name and his hopes of building a family with Gigi.

Adriana hopes Brody can distract Gigi from Rex and help keep the secret of Shane's paternity from coming out, which she fears will cement Gigi and Rex forever and doom Adriana's relationship with him. Traumatized by his experiences in the Iraq War and embittered by what he believes was Gigi's abandonment of him, Brody still has feelings for Gigi, but is hesitant to disrupt her life. Convinced by Adriana that Gigi and Shane need him, Brody finally makes his presence known to a shocked Gigi and elated Shane at Rex and Adriana's wedding.

With Rex married to Adriana, Gigi and Brody keep up the pretense that Brody is Shane's father; Gigi feels as though she has no choice but to allow Brody back into her life. As she is unwilling to disrupt Rex's marriage or crush her son's hopes and dreams of finally knowing his "father." Brody hopes to pursue a real relationship with Gigi, but she is soon wrapped up again with Rex, who separates from Adriana after discovering her machinations. Meanwhile, Brody focuses his attentions and affection on Shane, to whom he grows very close, thinking of the boy as "his son" in every respect. Brody sees in Shane an opportunity for a new start, and takes the initiative to find employment and begin attending Alcoholics Anonymous meetings. When Gigi leaves town to pursue the missing Rex to Texas, a jealous Brody takes charge of Shane and the household. Having grown dependent on Shane's love and validation, Brody fears that if Gigi and Rex are to reunite, he will lose access to the most important person in his life. When local psychic Madame Delphina cryptically warns Brody that Gigi and Rex may be "gone for good," Brody panics, fearing that Social Services will put Shane into the foster care system if he is unable to assert paternity. Brody uses Rex's DNA from a toothbrush to fake a paternity test which "proves" Brody to be Shane's father and therefore, his legal guardian in Gigi's absence. Brody's hopes are dashed, however, when Gigi and Rex return to Llanview together, Rex knowing the truth about Shane's paternity and the couple ready to tell Shane.

Despondent, Brody suffers a mental breakdown, trashing Gigi's house and accidentally injuring her friend Marcie McBain. Lapsing into "combat mode," Brody outmaneuvers Gigi and Rex by picking up Shane from school and taking him to Llantano Mountain. Once there, a delusional and armed Brody dons his old combat fatigues and begins to tell Shane about his experiences in Iraq. Losing track of reality, Brody suffers vivid hallucinations from his tours of duty, including the image of an Iraqi boy he had accidentally killed during a raid. Brody is cornered by the Llanview Police Department, accompanied by Gigi and Rex; initially, Brody uses Shane as a human shield, but soon declares he could never hurt "his son" and sends the boy to his mother. Police Commissioner Bo Buchanan, a former Vietnam vet, tries to talk Brody down, but an unstable Brody fires wildly, accidentally shooting Rex. Brody is arrested and taken into custody, where his condition worsens due to his severe case of posttraumatic stress disorder. Now aware of Brody's deep trauma stemming from his war experiences, a recovered Rex decides not to press charges, and a stabilized Brody is admitted to St. Ann's sanitarium for treatment.

At St. Ann's, Brody befriends Jessica Buchanan, who is recovering from her latest bout of dissociative identity disorder following the death of her husband Nash Brennan. Realizing his conflicting memories of the encounter in which he had shot the Iraqi boy, Brody learns that the boy had not been armed as he had been led to believe; a fellow soldier had put a gun in the child's hand to protect Brody. This realization helps Brody recover and secure his release, and he eventually begins a romantic relationship with Jessica. Brody helps Jessica through a relapse of her illness and the stillborn birth of Nash's baby, and becomes a Llanview Police officer.

Jessica's evil biological father Mitch Laurence returns and subjects her to electroshock therapy; she loses all memory beyond her senior year of high school. Believing she is still in love with her high school boyfriend Cristian Vega, Jessica repeatedly rejects Brody. May 21, 2010, a drunk and dejected Brody sleeps with Jessica's sister Natalie; Jessica regains her memory the same night while being seduced by Robert Ford. Brody and Natalie decide to keep their encounter a secret from both Jessica and Natalie's boyfriend John McBain. Natalie and Jessica both discover that they are pregnant; Brody assumes he is the father of Jessica's baby, but she keeps the secret that it may be Ford. Natalie is also fearful that Brody is her baby's father rather than John, and she confesses as much to a shocked Brody. On July 29, 2010, Brody proposes, and Jessica accepts. Brody is later furious to discover he may not be the father of her baby, but he and Jessica reconcile. Paternity tests declare Brody the father of both children, but Natalie never tells him that. She tells him her test says John is the babies father, which in reality it is, since the paternity results were changed by accident by Clint's assistant.

In January 2011, Jessica gives birth to her baby by C-section. They later name the baby Ryder Asa Lovett. Both of Brody's "sons" are born on the same day. On Brody/Jessica's and John/Natalie's double wedding, the truth about both babies fathers are revealed, and Tess comes back. Natalie and Brody grow closer and become a couple. On June 30, 2011, Brody finds out he is not Liam's father. On July 21, 2011, Brody finds Vimal's letter on John's desk and goes to find him at "The Sun" to warn him to keep his mouth closed. Marty, Victor, Vimal, Jack and Brody are the only ones who know the truth about baby Liam's paternity.

In September 2011, Brody proposed to Natalie, and she accepts. It is also revealed that John is still in love with Natalie, but he hasn't told her yet. Brody and Natalie's wedding doesn't go as planned when Natalie finds out that John is Liam's father and Brody has known for months. During the week of November 14, Brody goes off the deep end after losing Natalie and Liam, which causes him to kidnap Liam and hold Natalie and John at gun point. After thinking it over, Brody tearfully gives Liam back to his parents. On December 1, 2011, Brody is last seen having a conversation with Jessica in St. Ann's. The two vow to remain friends and stay in touch. Jessica says goodbye to Brody and tearfully leaves him behind.

During the series finale on January 13, 2012, Brody returns to Llanfair and informs Jessica that he has been released from St. Ann's. He also apologizes for the death of Ford and tells her that he has been offered another job in the Navy. She tells him to take care of himself. He tells her that if there is anything that she needs, he will be there for her. Even though things were rough between them, he will always care for her. She says that she really appreciates it, and with that Brody leaves town.

== Colin MacIver ==
Colin MacIver
- One Life to Live character
- Portrayed by: Ty Treadway
- Duration: 2000–2001, 2008
- First appearance: May 10, 2000
- Last appearance: October 2, 2008
- Created by: Megan McTavish
- Introduced by: Jill Farren Phelps
In-universe information
- Occupation: Doctor at Cherryvale Clinic
- Siblings: Colin MacIver; Emily MacIver
- Spouse: Melanie MacIver

Colin MacIver is a fictional character on the American soap opera, One Life to Live. He was played by Ty Treadway from May 10, 2000, until the character's death in May 2001. Treadway would go on to play Colin's twin brother, Troy, after Colin's death. Treadway reappeared as Colin during a dream sequence in 2008.

Colin first appears in May 2000 as the ex-husband of Lindsay Rappaport's sister, Melanie. Colin cares for Nora Buchanan, who had been seriously injured when the train she was riding derailed. Colin and Linsday conspire to hold Nora captive while her friends and family believe she died in the crash. It is during Nora's captivity that Lindsay wipes her short-term memory by injecting her with a drug.

In May 2001, Colin's dead body is found half-buried in the wooded area behind his house in Cherryvale. Sam Rappaport is eventually arrested and tried for the murder, with Nora serving as his attorney. While questioning Lindsay on the witness stand, Nora, who had still been suffering from some memory loss due to her brainwashing, has a flash of memory and realizes that she had actually been the one who killed Colin. Colin had been attacking her when Nora pushed him down a flight of stairs. Sam and Lindsay helped cover up the murder because they believed their daughter, Jennifer Rappaport, had been the killer.

In October 2008, Colin and Jen both appear in a dream sequence after Rex Balsom is shot, where Rex is forced to compete on a game show to determine if he could be Shane Morasco's father.

== Troy MacIver ==
Troy MacIver
- One Life to Live character
- Portrayed by: Ty Treadway
- Duration: 2001–04; 2012
- First appearance: August 8, 2001
- Last appearance: January 9, 2012
- Created by: Lorraine Broderick; Christopher Whitesell
- Introduced by: Gary Tomlin
In-universe information
- Occupation: Doctor at Llanview Hospital
- Siblings: Colin MacIver; Emily MacIver

Troy MacIver is a fictional character on the American soap opera, One Life to Live. He was played by Ty Treadway from August 8, 2001, to August 1, 2003, December 10, 2003, to February 9, 2004, and from January 3 to 9, 2012. Treadway previously played Troy's twin brother Colin from 2000 to 2001.

== Henry Mackler ==
Henry Mackler
- One Life to Live character
- Portrayed by: Jonathan Groff
- First appearance: April 11, 2007
- Last appearance: May 7, 2007
- Introduced by: Frank Valentini
In-universe information
- Occupation: Student

Henry Mackler is a fictional character on the American soap opera, One Life to Live. Jonathan Groff played the role from April 11 through May 7, 2007. The series originally planned for and filmed scenes of Mackler's exit as a school shooter, which were rewritten following the Virginia Tech massacre. The character dies in a car accident instead.

Henry Mackler is a bookish student whom the popular and manipulative Britney Jennings uses to do her schoolwork by encouraging his romantic feelings toward her. When Henry discovers the truth and confronts her about it, she gives him the cold shoulder. The following week, a distraught Henry speeds away from school in a car with Britney, Cole Thornhart, and Starr Manning. Cole discovers drugs and realizes that Henry is under the influence, and Henry refuses to stop the car and let the others free. Soon, Henry has chest pains, and drives the car into a tree. Though the others are merely bruised, Henry is not wearing his seatbelt, is thrown through the windshield, and dies.

== Sam Manning ==
Sam Manning
- One Life to Live character
- Portrayed by: Kyle and Zachary Kirchmann (2006); Zachary and Daniel Frisch (2006–07); Jacob and Luke Clodfelter (2007–10); Patrick Gibbons, Jr. (2010–13)
- Duration: 2006–13
- First appearance: February 6, 2006
- Last appearance: June 20, 2013
- Created by: Dena Higley
- Introduced by: Frank Valentini; Jennifer Pepperman (2013)
In-universe information
- Other names: Todd Spencer Manning Jr. (birth name); Thomas "Tommy" John McBain
- Family: Lord
- Father: Victor Lord, Jr.
- Mother: Margaret Cochran; Blair Cramer (adoptive)
- Stepmother: Téa Delgado
- Half-brothers: Victor Lord III
- Grandparents: Victor Lord; Irene Manning
- Aunts and uncles: Tony Lord; Victoria Lord; Meredith Lord; Tina Lord; Todd Manning; Ellen Cochran Foley
- Nieces and nephews: Hope Manning-Thornhart (adoptive)
- First cousins: Megan Gordon; Brian Kendall; Daniel Wolek; Kevin Buchanan; Joey Buchanan; Jessica Buchanan; Natalie Buchanan; Sarah Roberts; C. J. Roberts; Starr Manning; Danielle Manning; Jack Manning; Ginger Foley; Zane Buchanan; Kelly Cramer (adoptive); Cassie Callison (adoptive); Adriana Cramer (adoptive); Langston Wilde (adoptive)

Samuel "Sam" Manning is a fictional character on the American soap opera, One Life to Live. He is the son of Victor Lord, Jr. and Margaret Cochran. He was adopted by Blair Cramer. Sam was born on screen on February 6, 2006.

Long obsessed with Todd Manning and causing trouble for him and his family, Margaret Cochran appears on his wedding day to Blair Cramer. When he refuses to leave with her, she kidnaps him and holds him hostage. Wanting a child by Todd, Margaret rapes him; he allows it to happen to keep Margaret from murdering Blair. Margaret disappears and Todd and Blair are later reunited. A pregnant Margaret returns to Llanview, Pennsylvania, but is murdered. Todd is tried, convicted, and sentenced to death for the crime. He is revived at the last second by his enemy Dr. Spencer Truman as proof surfaces that Margaret is alive. With no memory of her time in Llanview, Margaret is first unable to recall even having a child; soon the memories come flooding back. It is revealed that Spencer had taken Margaret in, orchestrated her "murder", and framed Todd. Spencer had delivered Margaret's baby, whom she unofficially named Todd Manning Jr., on February 6, 2006, and had then disposed of it in a black market adoption. Margaret dies following a van wreck before she can reveal the details.

Todd hires Rex Balsom to find his son in late 2006. Rex soon discovers that the child is actually his own godson: Tommy, the adopted son of Marcie and Michael McBain. Familiar with the McBains' devotion to Tommy and knowing that they would be devastated if he were taken away, Rex is unsure what to do. Perceiving Todd's consideration of his missing son as nothing more than that of a lost possession, Rex decides to keep the secret. Rex goes so far as to fake a death certificate for Todd's missing child to get Todd to give up the search. An unhinged Spencer is murdered; in the wake of his death, hints to the whereabouts of Todd's son begin to surface, prompting Todd to resume his search. The rest of Spencer's final plan plays out as his heir, Miles Laurence, gives Todd proof that Spencer orchestrated the adoption of Todd's son by the McBains.

Todd takes the McBains to court to win custody of his son. On October 9, 2007, Todd is awarded custody. As he arrives at the McBains' to pick up his son, Marcie escapes with Tommy and flees town. Marcie and Tommy travel under assumed names to Paris, Texas. A disguised Marcie walks into the Bon Jour Café, not realizing that Victoria "Viki" Lord Davidson has been working there incognito to temporarily escape her life. Marcie befriends waitress Gigi Morasco, who soon discovers Marcie's identity but promises to not turn her in.

With Marcie and his son still at large, Todd announces on December 20, 2007, that "Tommy" will be renamed "Sam Manning," in honor of his deceased mentor and friend, Sam Rappaport. Having avoided Viki for weeks, Marcie soon comes face to face with her. When Todd and John appear at the Bon Jour, a desperate Marcie holds Viki at gunpoint. The FBI and police soon surround the diner. Michael is sent in to help an ailing Viki, becoming Marcie's willing prisoner as Viki is released to get medical attention. Michael convinces Marcie to surrender; they will lose their child but will still have each other for support. On January 14, 2008, Todd's son Sam is finally returned to him. Later that year, Todd gets into a car accident with Sam. Blair and Starr testify to Todd's recent violent and unstable behavior, and Todd loses custody of Sam to Blair.

Sam celebrates his seventh birthday on July 15, 2011, with his family at Todd's house. On his birthday, Sam is kidnapped by his "imaginary friend", who is actually the man with Todd's original face, disguised as Spider-Man, who had entertained him and his family at his birthday party. Sam later rescues Dorian Lord after she is kidnapped by Echo DiSavoy and taken hostage at the Minute Man Motel. Police Detective John McBain soon finds Echo, Dorian, and Sam at the motel, and John returns Sam to his family at Todd's house to continue celebrating his birthday party. In August 2011, it is revealed that Sam's father "Todd" was actually Todd's identical twin brother, Victor Lord Jr., who had been brainwashed into believing that he was Todd. On August 31, 2011, Victor is apparently murdered by the "real" Todd Manning. In the final months of the series, Sam grows increasingly close to his uncle, Todd. In the final episode, it is revealed that Sam's father, Victor Jr., is alive but being held captive.

== Hope Manning-Thornhart ==
Hope Manning-Thornhart
- One Life to Live character
- Portrayed by: Tess, Madeline and Molly Sullivan (2008–12) (and other child actors)
- Duration: 2008–12
- First appearance: November 6, 2008
- Last appearance: June 21, 2012
- Created by: Ron Carlivati
- Introduced by: Frank Valentini
- Crossover appearances: General Hospital
In-universe information
- Other names: Hope Manning McBain; Chloe Victoria Brennan
- Family: Lord; Cramer
- Parents: Cole Thornhart; Starr Manning
- Grandparents: Todd Manning; Blair Cramer; Patrick Thornhart; Marty Saybrooke
- Aunts and uncles: Danielle Manning; Jack Manning; Sam Manning (adoptive)

Hope Manning-Thornhart is a fictional character on the American soap operas, One Life to Live and General Hospital. She is the daughter of Cole Thornhart and Starr Manning, born on-screen on November 6, 2008. Tess, Madeline and Molly Sullivan played the role from 2008 until the One Life to Live series finale on January 13, 2012. Shiloh Nelson played Hope as a guest appearance on General Hospital on February 24, 27, and 28, 2012. On June 21, 2012, Cheyanna Prelesnik played the ghost of Hope on General Hospital.

When Starr uncovers her pregnancy in late summer 2008, she arranges for the child to be adopted by Marcie McBain, but Starr's estranged father Todd blackmails her doctor into agreeing to pretend the child dies so that he can raise the baby himself. Todd has a change of heart and calls off the plan after Hope is born. However, Starr's cousin Jessica Buchanan, under the influence of her alternate personality "Bess," switches Hope with Jessica's own newborn daughter, who had been stillborn the same day. Jessica reemerges not realizing that her newborn daughter is Starr's child, and Starr's family mourn the loss of the baby they believe is hers. The baby's headstone gives her name as Hope Manning McBain. The secret of the switch comes out in May 2009; Jessica finally remembers what happened, and tearfully returns the baby on June 5, 2009. Starr and Cole have a brief reunion with Hope before they hand her over to a grateful Marcie and her husband, Michael McBain. After overhearing Starr talking about her regrets, Marcie returns Hope to Starr on June 15, 2009. Hope's godparents are Markko Rivera and Langston Wilde.

In September 2009, Cole is working undercover for the police; Starr and Hope are kidnapped by Russian mobsters on orders from Mayor Lowell. They are rescued by Brody Lovett. In October 2010, Hope and Starr are kidnapped by Elijah Clarke but escape, only to be kidnapped again by Hannah O'Connor. They later escape her as well. When Cole goes to prison, Hope experiences nightmares and has trouble accepting Starr's new boyfriend James into her life. When the real Todd Manning returns, Starr is thrilled. She introduces him to Hope, who he nicknames 'Peanut'.

On February 24, 2012, Hope and her parents are driving through Port Charles, New York when Anthony Zacchara crashes into their car when his tires are shot out by Johnny Zacchara. Starr is able to get out of the car, but Hope and Cole are trapped inside when it topples over a cliff and explodes. They are presumed to have died among unrecognizable remains. On June 21, 2012, Hope appears as a seven-year-old ghost to Johnny Zacchara.

== Eve McBain ==
Eve McBain
- One Life to Live character
- Portrayed by: Lisa Banes (2004); Lisby Larson (2006)
- Duration: 2004; 2006
- First appearance: January 30, 2004
- Last appearance: October 12, 2006
- Created by: Michael Malone; Josh Griffith
- Introduced by: Frank Valentini
In-universe information
- Spouse: Thomas McBain
- Sons: John McBain; Michael McBain
- Grandsons: Gabriel McBain; Liam McBain
- Nieces: Shannon McBain

Eve McBain is a fictional character on the American soap opera One Life to Live. Lisa Banes played the role from January 30 until March 15, 2004, and Lisby Larson played the role from September 28 until October 12, 2006.

Eve McBain arrives in Llanview, Pennsylvania after she is invited to a dinner party by her son Michael’s friend Marcie Walsh. She decides to stay in town to catch up with her sons, John and Michael. Eve begins to go on a series of dates with Bo Buchanan. Weeks later, Eve is abducted by the Music Box Killer, and is forced to tell Natalie Buchanan that her dead husband Cristian Vega is alive. Natalie forgives Eve for lying after she discovers that Eve had been forced to tell Natalie about Cristian by the killer. Eve returns to Atlantic City.

In 2006, John tells Eve that he is going to ask Natalie to marry him. Eve comes back to town to give John her engagement ring. She is devastated to learn that John has died in a multi-car accident on his way to Atlantic City. After John's funeral, Eve gives Natalie the engagement ring as a way to remember John. Eve returns home, though John is later found to be alive.

== Paige Miller ==
Paige Miller
- One Life to Live character
- Portrayed by: Kimberlin Brown (2004–05); Cady Huffman (2005–06); Alexandra Neil (2006–07)
- Duration: 2004–07
- First appearance: October 12, 2004
- Last appearance: July 27, 2007
- Created by: Michael Malone
- Introduced by: Frank Valentini
In-universe information
- Occupation: Physician
- Spouse: Spencer Truman
- Children: Hugh Hughes

Dr. Paige Miller (also Truman) is a fictional character on the American soap opera, One Life to Live. The role was originally to be played by Mary Beth Evans, who backed out at the last minute, when she got a contract offer from As the World Turns, where she had been recurring since 2000. Kimberlin Brown originated the role on-screen from October 12, 2004, until June 30, 2005. Cady Huffman took over the role from August 19, 2005, until January 23, 2006. Alexandra Neil played the role from January 27, 2006 until July 27, 2007.

Paige Miller arrives at Llanview Hospital and is soon revealed to be the ex-wife of Dr. Spencer Truman. She begins dating Bo Buchanan. Paige teams up with Spencer's brother David Vickers to determine Spencer's real reason for coming to Llanview. In April 2006, the secret comes out: as a youth, David had shot police detective Thomas McBain, father of Detective John McBain. At the hospital, Paige had operated on Thomas despite the fact that she was intoxicated, and McBain had died. Spencer had covered up both crimes. David is arrested, and Paige's license to practice medicine is revoked. Later in 2006, it is revealed that Spencer actually shot McBain and framed Paige to keep a hold over her. It is also revealed that Paige had a son by Spencer and put him up for adoption, never telling Spencer. Llanview attorney Hugh Hughes is discovered to be that son, but is killed in a car wreck on September 22, 2006. By December 2006, an exonerated Paige has her medical license reinstated. Though she is slowly able to deal with her grief over Hugh, Paige continues to struggle emotionally and ultimately decides to leave town to work with the humanitarian aid group Doctors Without Borders. She says a final goodbye to Bo on July 27, 2007.

== Ray Montez ==
Ray Montez
- One Life to Live character
- Portrayed by: A Martinez
- Duration: 2008–09
- First appearance: September 10, 2008
- Last appearance: June 10, 2009
- Created by: Ron Carlivati
- Introduced by: Frank Valentini
In-universe information
- Occupation: Colombian drug lord
- Siblings: Linda Montez
- Spouse: Unnamed woman (pre-2008); Vanessa Montez (?–2008)
- Children: Lola Montez
- Nieces and nephews: Langston Wilde

Ray Montez is a fictional character on the American soap opera, One Life to Live. The role was played by actor A Martinez from September 10, 2008, through June 10, 2009.

Introduced as a prisoner in a Colombian maximum security prison, Ray appears onscreen found by Jared Banks September 10, 2008. Hoping to make amends with Buchanan family patriarch Clint, Jared seeks Ray's help in securing leverage against Dorian Lord, who has taken over Buchanan Enterprises. Clint and Jared plan to convince Ray, the only known parental blood relative of Dorian's foster daughter Langston Wilde, to seek custody of the teen, assuming that Dorian will return the company to the Buchanans in exchange for Ray's relinquishing his rights to Langston. Using his connections, Clint has arranged Ray's "exoneration" and release through the corrupt warden of Plato Prison. Ray agrees to Jared and Clint's proposition, and accompanies Jared back to Llanview, Pennsylvania.

Meanwhile, international crime boss Carlo Hesser kidnaps his nemesis Cristian Vega, and has him interred in Plato Prison, conspiring with the warden to give Cristian the prison jumpsuit worn by Cristian and imprison him under Ray's name. Cristian escapes the prison when he meets Ray's wife Vanessa, who bribes the warden for Cristian's freedom. Vanessa alleges that Ray wants her dead for testifying against him at his trial, where he stood accused of the murder of his first wife, the mother of his daughter Lola. Vanessa is anxious to accompany Cristian to Llanview with Lola, unaware that Ray is there as well.

Once in Llanview, Clint sets his plan into motion, and Ray crashes Langston and Dorian's party celebrating Langston's adoption. Upon introducing himself to his niece, Ray quickly grows fond of Langston, reminiscing about his past with his late sister Linda, Langston's mother. Soon thereafter, Ray pursues and is granted custody of Langston, and announces his intention to take her back to Colombia with him. Though this is still a part of Clint's gambit against Dorian, Ray is seemingly torn between his deal with Clint and his own burgeoning feelings for Langston, who desperately wants to remain in Llanview with her adoptive Cramer family and new friends. Ray gains custody, and Dorian refuses Clint's offer to have Ray relinquish his rights in exchange for Dorian signing Buchanan Enterprises back to him. At the airport with Langston, Ray comes face to face with Vanessa, who shoots him in front of everyone. She is arrested; a critically injured Ray tells the police detective Antonio Vega that Vanessa had framed him for his first wife's murder, but Antonio is doubtful. Meanwhile, Cristian defends Vanessa in court, and Langston befriends her newfound cousin Lola. Ray is sent back to Colombia, and Vanessa and Lola are soon threatened with deportation as well. Fearing retribution from Ray should she return to Colombia, Vanessa asks Cristian to do the only thing that can keep her in the United States: marry her. Initially reluctant because of his relationship with Sarah Roberts, Cristian ultimately marries Vanessa when an anonymous note threatens her life. Lawyer Téa Delgado is secretly representing Ray, seeking to prove that Vanessa had framed him for his wife's murder. Téa begins to win over Lola as Ray escapes prison again and confronts Vanessa in Llanview; she denies murdering Lola's mother, but admits in front of everyone that she had framed Ray as a way to take his money. Vanessa is deported on February 26, 2009, and Ray is exonerated.

To Dorian's chagrin, Ray and Lola are invited to move into Dorian's mansion La Boulaie by its short-term owners, Moe and Noelle Stubbs. Ray and Dorian eventually end up bonding as they fight, and share a kiss. Lola later confesses that she had been the one to kill her own mother after catching her in bed with another man. Lola is brought to St. Ann's Sanitarium for evaluation. Ray leaves town on June 10, 2009, after telling a crushed Dorian that he has sent Lola to a facility out of town and plans to join her himself.

== Stacy Morasco ==
Stacy Morasco
- One Life to Live character
- Portrayed by: Crystal Hunt (2009–10, 2012); Farah Fath (2011)
- Duration: 2009–12
- First appearance: February 6, 2009
- Last appearance: January 9, 2012
- Created by: Ron Carlivati
- Introduced by: Frank Valentini
In-universe information
- Other names: Gigi
- Occupation: Las Vegas stripper
- Siblings: Gigi Morasco
- Children: Sierra Rose Morasco
- Nieces and nephews: Shane Balsom

Stacy Morasco is a fictional character on the American soap opera, One Life to Live. Crystal Hunt originated the role on February 6, 2009, and played the role until March 9, 2010. Farah Fath, who played Stacy's sister Gigi Morasco, portrayed Stacy for a series of flashbacks on October 11, December 22 and December 23, 2011. Hunt reprised the role during the series finale week on January 9, 2012.

=== Casting ===
Hunt's casting as Stacy was announced in December 2008, as "a bad girl with a connection to someone in Llanview."

Of Hunt's March 2010 exit, One Life to Live Executive Producer Frank Valentini said, "It was time for Stacy to leave the canvas. Sometimes it's great when the audience hates a character. It keeps them involved and we certainly don't want to make them mad, but some people, you just don't like and yet they're in your world and they do tend to cause some excitement, so that's not a bad thing. It was storyline-dictated and it was time to help propel all of the other characters into major story." In the same article, Soap Opera Digest noted that the character of Stacy had "never clicked with viewers and critics."

=== Storylines ===
Stacy Morasco, younger sister to Gigi, is first seen on February 6, 2009, as a Las Vegas stripper named "Gigi." She begins spying on Gigi and Rex Balsom, later following them back to Llanview. Gigi is thrilled to see her, but devastated by the news that their parents had died in a car crash years before, and Stacy's own struggles since. Stacy makes fast friends with Gigi and Rex's son Shane, although Gigi is somewhat uncomfortable with Stacy's influence. Gigi also begins to suspect that her sister is trying to seduce Rex. After Shane is diagnosed with leukemia in March 2009, Stacy learns of a matching donor. Wanting Rex for herself, she pretends that she is the match and forces Gigi to break up with Rex in exchange for her blood. Shane receives the transplant and improves, but Gigi is afraid to reveal Stacy's blackmail in case Shane needs more of her stem cells. Eventually, Gigi tells the truth, but in the meantime Stacy and Rex have slept together. Rex and Gigi reunite as Stacy's blackmail is revealed. Rex spurns Stacy, but she discovers that she is pregnant. She miscarries but keeps the truth from Rex knowing that it is her only hold over him. Stacy calls her stripper best friend Kimberly Andrews to come to Llanview, who comes up with a plan to help get Stacy pregnant again to pass the baby off as Rex's. She drugs ex-boyfriend Schuyler Joplin but he refuses her. She becomes pregnant after seducing a drunken Oliver Fish. In November 2009 Schuyler finds out that Stacy lost her baby with Rex, and Kim tells Schuyler that he is the baby's father. Schuyler agrees to keep the truth from Rex so that he can have Gigi for himself. In January 2010 Rex's crazed biological father Mitch Laurence tries to kidnap Stacy to raise her baby as his heir. Kim and Stacy tells Schuyler to steal a drug called oxytocin so Stacy can give birth a month before her due date to pass the baby as Rex's. On February 2, 2010, Stacy is kidnapped by Mitch Laurence. When she reveals that the baby is not Rex's, Mitch abandons Stacy in a blizzard. Gigi finds her, takes her to a cabin, and on February 11, 2010, helps Stacy deliver a baby girl she names Sierra Rose. On February 16, 2010, Stacy falls through the ice of a frozen lake; despite Rex and Oliver's attempts to save her, she disappears beneath the ice and is presumed dead. Days later, Stacy's spirit appears to Kim several times to get Kim's assurance that she will do all she can to care for Sierra.

On August 22, 2011, Kimberly, who is in Anchorage, Kentucky working as a stripper at The Spotted Pony strip club, is seen talking to a mysterious comatose woman at a hospital. Next to the mysterious woman's bed is a picture of Stacy and Kim together, and it is implied that Stacy is still alive. On September 20, 2011, Kim is heard saying "That was a close one, Stacy!". On October 10, 2011, it is revealed that Stacy has Gigi's face due to plastic surgery. Kim confesses to Cutter that she tried to stop Stacy's scheme against Gigi when she followed Stacy to Llanview, and found her in the basement of a rental house that was leaking carbon monoxide, along with Gigi's dead body.

On October 14, 2011, Stacy wakes up from her coma, and Cutter decides to use her as leverage to blackmail Rex for the Buchanan fortune. Stacy leaves the hospital and goes to Llanview. She goes to Gigi's gravesite, confused about who she is and why she looks like her dead sister. Cutter explains everything to Stacy. On October 28, he convinces her to crash Natalie and Brody's costume themed engagement party so that when she sees Rex and Shane at the party, it can help her to get her memories back. Stacy tells Cutter that she wants out of their deal so that she can get plastic surgery to look like her old self again. On November 14 she decides to go to Brazil to get her old face back, and Cutter goes with her. Stacy and Cutter run into Alex Olanov at the doctor's, the mother of Cutter and Kim. Alex helps Stacy and Cutter get rid of Rex and Aubrey. Later Cutter finds out that Stacy is really Gigi, and Stacy is the one who died in the basement. On January 9, 2012, Stacy appears to Clint in Hell, convincing him he is going to Hell before he will be able to get Viki out of Heaven and back to Earth. Stacy and Eddie Ford then go take Mitch Laurence to Hell, and Stacy tells him that Jessica is not really his daughter.

== Noelle Ortiz-Stubbs ==
Nicole Ortiz Stubbs
- One Life to Live character
- Portrayed by: January LaVoy
- Duration: 2007–09; 2011
- First appearance: October 22, 2007
- Last appearance: December 20, 2011
- Created by: Ron Carlivati
- Introduced by: Frank Valentini
In-universe information
- Occupation: Waitress
- Spouse: Moe Stubbs (2009–)

Noelle Ortiz-Stubbs is a fictional character on the American soap opera, One Life to Live. January LaVoy portrayed the role from October 22, 2007, until January 17, 2008, May 7 until May 12, 2008, July 16 until August 28, 2008, December 1, 2008, until December 28, 2009, and December 7 until December 20, 2011.

Noelle is a waitresses at the Bon Jour Café in Paris, Texas, where Moe Stubbs is the owner. Longtime platonic friends, the two begin to grow closer in 2007 while they are seen during Viki Davidson and Gigi Morasco's time in Paris. Close friends with Viki, Noelle shares tales of woe from life with her ex-husband. When fugitive Marcie McBain (who had been posing as new waitress "Sally Ann") is arrested along with Noelle's fellow waitress Gigi Morasco following a police stand-off, Noelle takes care of Gigi's young son Shane.

Moe and Noelle are seen again in May 2008, when Natalie and Jared Banks visit Paris and the Bon Jour to get away from the prying eyes of the Buchanan family. They are unaware that the notorious David Vickers, the true Buchanan heir, has taken a job at the Bon Jour as a busboy. After discovering that Jared and Natalie are lying to the Buchanans about Jared's lineage, David quits the Bon Jour, urging Moe and Noelle to admit their feelings for each other.

Moe and Noelle reappear again in July 2008 when Bo Buchanan and Rex Balsom visit the Bon Jour separately. By this time, Moe and Noelle have revealed their feelings for each other and are shown to be in a committed romantic relationship. When Bo and Rex travel through time back to 1968, they discover Moe and Noelle's counterparts in the past: Moe is "Jeremiah Stubbs," (Moe's father), the hippie proprietor of what was then known as the Good Day Café, and Noelle is "Rosa," a strong-willed Mexican maid working for the Buchanan family alongside Maria Vasquez. Rosa is Maria's only confidante about her out-of-wedlock pregnancy by Clint Buchanan; her unborn child will grow up to be Cord Roberts. Jeremiah and Rosa are shown to have feelings for one another. Back in 2008, Gigi returns to Paris during her search for a missing Rex, Noelle has the chance to catch up with her former co-worker. After the customers leave, Moe proposes to Noelle, who accepts.

In late 2008, an engaged Moe and Noelle visit Viki at the Buenos Dias Café, Carlotta Vega's burned-down diner rebuilt as a recreation of the Bon Jour Café. Moe and Noelle soon marry in Las Vegas on February 9, 2009.

== Lee Ramsey ==
Lee Ramsey
- One Life to Live character
- Portrayed by: Hunt Block
- Duration: 2007–08
- First appearance: October 16, 2007
- Last appearance: June 13, 2008
- Introduced by: Frank Valentini
In-universe information
- Occupation: FBI Agent

Lee Ramsey is a fictional character on the American soap opera, One Life to Live. Hunt Block portrayed the role from October 16, 2007, until June 13, 2008.

FBI Agent Lee Ramsey is assigned to track down Marcie McBain, who has taken her adoptive son Tommy on the run after custody is awarded to his biological father, Todd Manning. Ramsey and John McBain share some bad blood: Ramsey had carried an unrequited torch for John's late fiancée, Caitlin Fitzgerald, and blames John for her murder years before at the hands of a serial killer whom both men were tracking. As Marcie is married to John's brother Michael McBain, John initiates his own pursuit of her. He and Ramsey continually run into one another on their separate searches across the country. After Marty Saybrooke and her son Cole Thornhart go missing, John returns to Llanview to find them. John discovers that Ramsey has been searching for the terrorist who had murdered Marty's husband, Patrick Thornhart, and entices Ramsey to break off his hunt for Marcie in order to finally capture Patrick's killer. John and Ramsey are forced to work together to track down Marty and Cole. John discovers a microchip and uses it to bargain with terrorist Simon Ryerson in Ireland in exchange for Marty and Cole's safety. The transaction is botched by Ramsey's reckless actions and Marty is apparently killed in an explosion. Ramsey is suspended by the Bureau for his conduct during the affair.

Now a free agent, Ramsey offers his services to Todd as a bounty hunter. They confront waitress Gigi Morasco, whom they soon discover is hiding Marcie from the authorities. Ramsey takes Gigi and her son Shane hostage and demands that Gigi call Marcie to meet with her. Marcie arrives but escapes. Ramsey attempts to gun her down while she is still holding Tommy. Todd struggles with Ramsey, and Michael McBain is shot instead. He survives and Marcie is apprehended. Ramsey visits Gigi in jail and threatens to harm her and Shane if she tells anyone about Ramsey and Todd holding her hostage. He is later arrested, but on February 15, 2008, is inexplicably named the new Commissioner of Police after the mayor fires Bo Buchanan. It soon becomes clear that Mayor Lowell is in league with Ramsey.

Llanview police officers Antonio Vega and Talia Sahid are determined to get Bo his job back, and work with John to oust Ramsey and expose him as a crooked cop. To this end, Antonio and Talia stage a break-up, and Antonio tricks Ramsey into believing that he has switched allegiances and is open to Ramsey's corrupting influences. With Antonio as an accomplice, Ramsey orchestrates the theft of the crown jewels of Mendorra. During the heist, Ramsey attempts to have Talia framed for collusion and dismissed from the force. On June 11, 2008, it is revealed that Ramsey has been secretly caring for an injured Marty in the penthouse he had purchased from Todd, and that he had the jewels stolen in order to pay for Marty's medical care. It becomes clear that Ramsey has compassion for Marty and harbors regret for his part in her near-fatal accident. He tells Marty that he hopes to heal her physical and mental traumas and release her to her family and friends, and then be reinstated by the FBI. Ramsey's buyer for the jewels turns out to be Todd's long-lost sister Tina Lord, now the Crown Princess of Mendorra. Tina arrives at the penthouse with a briefcase full of Euros, and the two make an exchange. When Tina briefly moves in another room, thugs sent by United States Ambassador Jonas Chamberlain burst into the penthouse and shoot Ramsey to death. Ramsey's last act is to crawl towards the stairs in an attempt to protect Marty.

After Ramsey's death, Carlo Hesser reveals that he had had Ramsey appointed to the commissioner's office. In addition, Ramsey had been in Hesser's employ as part of the scheme with the Mendorran crown jewels, and had secured Carlo's secret release from Statesville Prison.

== Jennifer Rappaport ==
Jennifer Rappaport
- One Life to Live character
- Portrayed by: Jessica Morris
- Duration: 2001–2005, 2008
- First appearance: January 17, 2001
- Last appearance: October 1, 2008
- Created by: Megan McTavish
- Introduced by: Jill Farren Phelps (2001); Frank Valentini (2008)
In-universe information
- Other names: Jennifer Lynne Rappaport (Full Name); Jennifer Balsom; Jennifer Buchanan
- Parents: Sam Rappaport; Lindsay Rappaport
- Brothers: Will Rappaport
- Husband: Rex Balsom (2003); Joey Buchanan (2003–04)
- Grandparents: Sam Davidson; Jane Rappaport
- Aunts and uncles: Ben Davidson (adoptive); Grace Davidson; Melanie MacIver
- Nieces and nephews: Megan Rappaport

Jennifer Rappaport is a fictional character on the American daytime drama One Life to Live. She was portrayed by Jessica Morris from January 2001 to May 2005. Morris reappeared as Jen in a dream sequence on October 1, 2008.

Jen Rappaport arrives in Llanview in January 2001 as a student at Llanview University. She is the daughter of Sam and Lindsay Rappaport. Jen begins a relationship with Cristian Vega, but when she discovers that Cristian is falling in love with Natalie Buchanan, Jen has sex with Al Holden so as to become pregnant. She claims that the baby is Cristian's. However, during their wedding ceremony, Jen suffers a miscarriage, and she and Cristian end their relationship.

In 2003, Jennifer starts to transform her life following Sam's murder. She finds herself torn between Joey Buchanan and Rex Balsom. Jen is married to both men in the summer of 2003, eloping with Rex first, then annulling that marriage before getting married in a more traditional ceremony to Joey in August. She then learns that she is pregnant with Joey's child, only to suffer another miscarriage after a bumpy ride on Rex's motorcycle. Jen begins taking birth control pills behind Joey's back, but it is not long before Joey finds out. That, coupled with Jen's affair with Rex, cause Joey and Jen to divorce. Shortly afterward, Joey takes a leave of absence from the church and moves to London. In 2004, Jen befriends local rocker, Riley Colson. Riley's girlfriend, Sarah Roberts, is attacked by the Music Box Killer and is whisked away to London to recover. Jen helps Riley heal after he receives a letter from Sarah breaking up with him.

The community center burns down, and in order for Riley, Jen, Marcie Walsh, and several others to revive their failing grades, they work together to rebuild the community center. After several sabotages on the construction site, the community center comes together and the project is soon completed. After Jen experiences a handful of sleepwalking incidences at night where she would crawl into Riley's bed, she and Riley pursue a relationship. Several months later, Jen breaks up with Riley when he cannot bring himself to believe that Jen had no involvement in the murder of Paul Cramer. Jen once again becomes close to Rex.

The evidence in Paul's murder investigation begins piling up on Jen. As Jen is leaving her mother's art gallery, she catches Riley's father, Daniel, planting evidence in her car. Jen threatens to call the police, but she is suffocated by Daniel and he makes death look like a suicide. The police close in on Daniel and he is soon arrested as he is about to be sworn in as Lieutenant Governor of Pennsylvania. Daniel is eventually sent to prison.

In October 2008, Jen appears in a dream sequence after Rex is shot, where Rex is forced to compete on a game show to determine if he could be Shane Morasco's father.

== Claudia Reston ==
Claudia Reston
- One Life to Live character
- Portrayed by: Kerry Butler
- Duration: 2006–07
- First appearance: January 18, 2006
- Last appearance: January 3, 2007
- Created by: Dena Higley
- Introduced by: Frank Valentini
In-universe information
- Occupation: Singer
- Parents: George Reston

Claudia Reston is a fictional character on the American soap opera, One Life to Live. Kerry Butler portrayed the role on a contract status from January 18, 2006 until January 3, 2007.

Claudia Reston is the ex-girlfriend and later friend to Nash Brennan. Nash's pregnant girlfriend Tess, the alternate personality of Jessica Buchanan, visits Claudia in a drug rehab, where Claudia has been since her break-up with Nash. Claudia, a rich heiress and a recovering alcoholic, explains that Nash made her believe he loved her, but was really scamming her for her father's money. Nash explains that his grifter days are behind him and that he sincerely regrets taking advantage of Claudia. Seemingly rehabilitated, Claudia soon appears in Llanview, taking a job as a singer at Antonio Vega's club, Capricorn. Soon her powerful father, George, arrives, blaming Nash for Claudia's troubles. After Mr. Reston threatens Nash and Tess' lives, Nash turns to Claudia for help. Claudia hopes to regain Nash's love by aiding him in a scheme against her father, but their plan ends in tragedy when George Reston ends up dead by Claudia's hand during a scuffle with Nash. Nash helps her cover up the accident. Claudia continues to try and woo Nash while befriending Antonio. When she falls off the wagon on New Year's Eve 2006, Nash and Antonio urge her to go to rehab. Claudia then heads back to New York City to detox and start a new life.

== Keri Reynolds ==
Keri Reynolds
- One Life to Live character
- Portrayed by: Sherri Saum
- Duration: 2001–2003
- First appearance: August 31, 2001
- Last appearance: October 13, 2003
- Created by: Lorraine Broderick and Christopher Whitesell
- Introduced by: Gary Tomlin
In-universe information
- Occupation: Professor at Llanview University
- Parents: R. J. Gannon; Liz Coleman Reynolds
- Children: Jamie Vega
- Grandmothers: Janine Gannon
- Aunts and uncles: Hank Gannon
- First cousins: Rachel Gannon

Keri Reynolds is a fictional character on the American soap opera, One Life to Live. Sherri Saum portrayed the role from August 31, 2001, until October 13, 2003. Keri is the daughter of R.J. Gannon and Liz Reynolds.

== Liz Reynolds ==
Liz Reynolds
- One Life to Live character
- Portrayed by: Barbara Niven
- Duration: 2002–03
- First appearance: September 3, 2002
- Last appearance: March 7, 2003
- Created by: Lorraine Broderick; Christopher Whitesell
- Introduced by: Gary Tomlin
In-universe information
- Children: Keri Reynolds
- Grandchildren: Jamie Vega

Elizabeth "Liz" Coleman Reynolds is a fictional character on the American soap opera, One Life to Live. The role was portrayed by Barbara Niven from September 3, 2002, until March 7, 2003.

Antonio Vega leaves Llanview after he is suspended from the police force for accidentally shooting Ben Davidson. He meets a woman named Liz and confides in her about his problems. Soon after, they meet again when Antonio comes upon Liz and her car broken down. She tells him about the recent death of her husband, and she and Antonio have a one-night stand. Antonio later learns that she is Liz Reynolds, the mother of Antonio's fiancée, Keri Reynolds. Liz becomes pregnant, but is unable to carry the baby due to a medical condition, so Keri agrees to serve as a surrogate mother. The fetus is successfully transplanted, and when a paternity test proves him to be the father, Antonio and Liz decide to withhold that information from Keri.

Liz decides to stay in Llanview and renews her relationship with R.J. Gannon, who is Keri's father. R.J. learns the truth about the baby and is about to tell Keri when Antonio handcuffs him to a booth in the diner. Antonio tells Keri that the baby is his, which causes Keri to go into premature labor. Keri gives birth to a baby girl, but tests later prove that the surrogacy had actually failed and that Keri had already been pregnant herself with Antonio's child. Hating Antonio, R.J. helps Keri, Liz, and the baby sneak out of town. Their plane crashes, leaving no survivors, and Antonio is devastated at the loss of Keri and their daughter. Months later, Natalie Buchanan begins to suspect that R.J. is up to something, and soon discovers that Keri and the baby had never gotten on the plane and had been hiding out in Toronto. After returning to Llanview, Keri reveals that she renamed her daughter Jamie and that Liz had actually died in the plane crash.

== Markko Rivera ==
Markko Rivera
- One Life to Live character
- Portrayed by: Jason Tam
- Duration: 2007–12
- First appearance: May 21, 2007
- Last appearance: January 13, 2012
- Created by: Ron Carlivati; Dena Higley
- Introduced by: Frank Valentini
In-universe information
- Other names: Geraldo Rivera
- Occupation: Student (Junior) at UCLA; Director
- Parents: Aurelia Rivera; Ernesto Rivera
- Other relatives: Hope Manning-Thornhart (goddaughter)

Markko Rivera is a fictional character from ABC's daytime drama One Life to Live, portrayed by Jason Tam since May 21, 2007. Tam last aired as Markko on November 10, 2010, when he left town to continue studying at UCLA. He returned on April 11 and 12, 2011, to coincide with Langston Wilde's exit and on July 28 and 29, 2011, for his Vickerman film premiere. He made an appearance during the final episode of the show on January 13, 2012.

Markko appears in the gym of Llanview High School during tryouts for the school musical. Immediately annoyed by him, Langston Wilde challenges him to try out. During the prom, English teacher Marcie McBain gets ahead of herself, and announces Markko and Langston as king and queen of the dance. After prom night, Markko and Langston begin dating.

A few months into their relationship, Markko becomes concerned about the constant absence of Langston's parents. Sensing that something is not right, Dorian Lord hires private investigator Rex Balsom to dig up information on Langston. Dorian learns that Langston has been orphaned and living on her own for over a year. Dorian becomes Langston's guardian instead. Langston moves into Dorian's home and happily continues her relationship with Markko.

After Starr becomes pregnant, she decides to have an abortion before her family or Cole Thornhart (the baby's father) learn about her pregnancy. At the last moment, Langston gives Cole the address of the abortion clinic. After convincing Starr to take the time to make the right decision, Cole and Starr return to Llanview. With Markko's help, Cole and Starr run off to Virginia Beach. Dorian finds Langston hiding a book about pregnancy and suspects that she is pregnant and that Markko is the father, but the truth about Starr's pregnancy soon comes out.

Problems arise when Ray Montez, Langston's biological uncle, arrives in town. Ray was hired by Clint Buchanan in a scheme to remove Langston from Dorian's guardianship. Ray gains custody of Langston and prepares to leave the country with her, but his wife, Vanessa, arrives in town and shoots him. Ray is taken back to prison, allowing Markko and Langston to stay together.

Ray's daughter, Lola, also arrives in Llanview and tries to develop a friendship with Langston. She also develops an obsession for Markko. Markko and Langston decide to finally have sex on prom night, but because of what happened with Starr and Cole, they plan ahead. Markko runs into problems when he tries to buy condoms and the salesperson at the pharmacy is a friend of his mother; he gets Cole to buy the condoms for him. Lola tries several times to stop Markko and Langston, but fails to stop them from having sex.

Markko's parents, Aurelia and Ernesto Rivera, are introduced on June 12, 2009, on the day that Markko graduates from Llanview High School as valedictorian. He secretly plans to attend medical school.

Ray Montez decides to return to Colombia and take Lola with him, which upsets Dorian so much that she gets drunk at Markko and Langston's graduation party. In her inebriated state, she reveals to Markko's parents that Markko and Langston had sex on prom night. As a result, Ernesto, who has an extensive knowledge of Dorian's history, believes that she is a bad influence on Markko and forbids him from seeing Langston. After refusing to stop seeing her, Ernesto disowns him.

In 2010, Markko, Cole, Starr, and Langston move into an apartment together. Markko and Langston's relationship is tested when Robert Ford, the new teacher's assistant at Llanview University, attempts to seduce Langston. Though she initially rebuffs his advances, she soon succumbs and the two embark upon an affair. Through a series of clues, Markko learns of their affair and finds Langston and Ford in an embrace after her senior prom. Markko breaks up with her.

Markko leaves for college in July 2010, but returns to Llanview briefly in September 2010. He runs into Langston and informs her that he is in town because his father is having surgery.

Markko returns in April 2011 to invite Langston to move back to Los Angeles with him to assist him with a new David Vickers film. They are shown looking through an old scrapbook before leaving for Los Angeles. It is implied that Markko and Langston may have rekindled their romance upon leaving Llanview. Markko briefly returns to Llanview in July 2011 to attend the film premiere of Vickerman. It is revealed that he and Wilde are indeed back together and are very successful in their careers.

== Talia Sahid ==
Talia Sahid
- One Life to Live character
- Portrayed by: BethAnn Bonner
- Duration: 2006–09
- First appearance: December 21, 2006
- Last appearance: April 22, 2009
- Created by: Dena Higley
- Introduced by: Frank Valentini
In-universe information
- Other names: Talia Cosima Hesser (birth name)
- Occupation: Police officer, Llanview Police Department
- Parents: Carlo Hesser
- Stepparents: Faris Sahid; Alex Olanov (1992-1996)
- Siblings: Johnny Dee Hesser; Charlotte Hesser
- Spouse: Jonas Chamberlain (2008)
- Grandparents: Stephan Bern; Wilma Bern
- Aunts and uncles: Mortimer Bern; Joseph Hobart (adoptive)
- First cousins: Stephanie Hobart (adoptive)

Talia Sahid is a fictional character from ABC's daytime drama One Life to Live. She is portrayed by BethAnn Bonner.

=== Casting ===
Starting on June 8, 2006, Bonner was a participant in the SOAPnet reality series I Wanna Be a Soap Star 3, in which contestants compete in various acting challenges for a 13-week contract role on a daytime drama. Bonner finished in third place. The winner, Mike Jerome, went on to portray Ted Osbourne on One Life to Live from August 11, 2006, to November 2, 2006, when the character was killed off. One Life to Live subsequently offered Bonner the role of Talia, a police officer involved in the investigation of Osbourne's death. The character was originally to be named Rhonda, but when the show's writers determined that she would be investigating the hate crime/arson case, they decided to add more depth to the character by making her an ethnic minority. The character was renamed Talia, and she became an Arab-American with a Syrian father.

=== Character history ===
Talia is introduced in 2006 as a Llanview police officer investigating an arson in which a man had been killed. She begins working closely with Detective Antonio Vega, with whom she forms and easy friendship and shares her experiences as a member of New York City Police Department on duty in Lower Manhattan on the day of the September 11 attacks. In late March 2007, Talia, Antonio, and Acting District Attorney Evangeline Williamson figure out that the string of arsons plaguing Llanview are being perpetrated by a white supremacist group known as "One Pure People". In May 2007, the Syrian Talia, Antonio's Latino brother Cristian, African American Evangeline and Jewish returning District Attorney Nora Hanen are gassed by OPP at Cristian's loft apartment. All survive the attack with few ill effects except Evangeline, who is left comatose. The investigation finally reveals celebrity baseball player Tate Harmon to be the ringleader behind OPP. Talia shoots and arrests him before he murders several hostages.

Antonio announces his divorce from Jessica Buchanan in the summer of 2007. After months of working side by side with him, Talia has developed a secret crush on her commanding officer Antonio and become close to his family and his young daughter Jamie. The reserved Talia is determined to not let on how she feels, believing that Antonio is reeling from the end of his marriage, and that any romantic tension would ruin their friendship and their professional relationship. Eventually Talia spends Thanksgiving 2007 with Antonio and his family, during which she shares a sensual dance with him in his mother's diner. An uncharacteristically impulsive Talia risks kissing Antonio and confessing her feelings for him. Antonio, still hurt after his divorce, rebuffs her advances politely; a humiliated Talia leaves. Their personal and professional relationship begins to disintegrate, and after a few awkward exchanges at work, Talia requests a transfer to the quiet neighboring township of Cherryvale. Antonio and Talia argue over her transfer, but Police Commissioner Bo Buchanan reluctantly agrees to her request.

Antonio soon realizes that he is only waffling about his feelings for Talia out of fear of being hurt again and decides he cannot pass up this opportunity for true love. On New Year's Eve, he races to meet her at the bus station, takes her in his arms, and passionately kisses her. Talia agrees to give Antonio a second chance at pursuing a tentative romantic relationship and happily stays in Llanview. Unfortunately, when the two officers return to work, Bo informs Talia that despite her change of heart, the work transfer is final and she is expected to report to Cherryvale immediately. Talia and Antonio resolve to continue their long-distance relationship as best they can on their "off-hours", but their work schedules prove more and more incompatible. Talia eventually switches places with Antonio's new partner, Oliver Fish, and transfers back to Llanview. She and Antonio resume their romance, but they soon choose sides against each other over the new police commissioner, renegade former FBI agent Lee Ramsey. Antonio remains loyal to Ramsey while Talia and Detective John McBain do not trust him; Antonio and Talia break up publicly when it becomes clear that she and John have slept together. As Ramsey comes to trust Antonio and take him into his confidence, it is revealed that the breakup had been a ruse concocted by Antonio, John, and Talia to entrap Ramsey. The Commissioner enlists Antonio in his plot to steal the Crown Jewels of Mendorra while they are in police custody but is murdered on June 12, 2008, before he can be brought to justice.

On June 26, 2008, Talia inexplicably aids Jonas Chamberlain, the Ambassador to the U.S. from the European principality of Mendorra, in kidnapping her roommate Sarah Roberts. Soon Antonio and Cristian discover that Jonas has both women; they and Sarah's mother Tina Lord — who had been posing as the Crown Princess of Mendorra — agree to accompany Jonas back to Mendorra in order to make an exchange: Sarah and Talia for the Crown Jewels which Tina has in her possession.

In Mendorra, villain Carlo Hesser is revealed to be Talia's estranged father, and the real mastermind behind the kidnappings. Born Talia Cosima Hesser, she is Carlo's youngest child; during her early childhood, she had lived under Carlo's tyrannical rule, tormented by her demented siblings, Johnny Dee and Charlotte. Eventually, Talia had escaped from Carlo with her mother, who remarried a hardworking Syrian man. Taking her stepfather's last name "Sahid," Talia had eventually gone into law enforcement for the express purpose of repudiating all the evil done by Carlo, and in the hopes of eventually bringing him to justice.

Talia despises Carlo, a longtime enemy of both Tina and the Vega brothers. Carlo intends to force Talia to marry Jonas, the true heir to the throne and Carlo's puppet. Talia protests and stalls, but goes through with the royal wedding on July 31, 2008, to save Antonio and her friends from harm — not knowing that Jonas has already stabbed Antonio and left him for dead. A wounded Antonio appears, overpowers Jonas and the guards and leads Talia to safety, but Carlo, Jonas and their men catch up. Talia brokers a deal with Carlo: she will stay if the others are allowed to leave. With several people's lives at stake, a furious Antonio is forced to leave Talia behind. Antonio, Sarah and Cristian later return; they drug Carlo and Jonas and stage them in bed together, and Talia leads a team of reporters to "discover" the scene. With a protesting Carlo and Jonas arrested for fraud, Talia and the others leave Mendorra.

While investigating a string of murders, Talia goes to Dorian Lord's house to bring in John McBain for questioning; with a fellow officer ringing the doorbell, she searches the back of the house and is stabbed in the front torso by the "Llanview Slasher" (later revealed to be Powell Lord III) on April 17, 2009. John subsequently finds her body floating face down in Dorian's swimming pool. Talia's photo is hung on the police station's wall of fallen officers.

== Moe Stubbs ==
Moe Stubbs
- One Life to Live character
- Portrayed by: John Rue
- Duration: 2007–09; 2011
- First appearance: October 22, 2007
- Last appearance: December 20, 2011
- Created by: Ron Carlivati
- Introduced by: Frank Valentini
In-universe information
- Occupation: Cafe owner
- Spouse: Nicole Ortiz Stubbs (2009–present)

Maurice "Moe" Stubbs is a fictional character on the American soap opera, One Life to Live. John Rue portrayed the role from October 22, 2007, until January 17, 2008, May 7 until May 12, 2008, July 16 until August 28, 2008, December 1, 2008, until November 25, 2009, and December 6, 2011, until December 20, 2011.

Moe is the owner and chef of the Bon Jour Café in Paris, Texas. Longtime platonic friends with Noelle Ortiz, the two begin to grow closer in 2007 while they are seen during Victoria "Viki" Lord Davidson and Gigi Morasco's time in Paris. Moe and Noelle are seen again in May 2008, when Natalie and Jared Banks visit Paris to get away from the prying eyes of the Buchanan family. They are unaware that the notorious David Vickers, the true Buchanan heir, has taken a job at the Bon Jour as a busboy alongside Moe and Noelle. After discovering that Jared and Natalie are lying to the Buchanans about Jared's lineage, David leaves the Bon Jour, urging Moe and Noelle to admit their feelings for each other.

Moe and Noelle reappear again in July 2008 when Bo Buchanan and Rex Balsom visit the Bon Jour separately. By this time, Moe and Noelle have revealed their feelings for each other and are shown to be in a committed romantic relationship. When Bo and Rex travel through time back to 1968, they discover Moe and Noelle's counterparts in the past: Moe is "Jeremiah Stubbs," (Moe's father), the hippie proprietor of what was then known as the Good Day Café, and Noelle is "Rosa," a strong-willed Mexican maid working for the Buchanan family alongside Maria Vasquez. Jeremiah and Rosa are shown to have feelings for one another. Unlike Moe, Jeremiah is a mellow, peace-loving fellow who is shown to oppose the Vietnam War and deal in certain "medicinal substances," which he includes as ingredients in some of his baked goods. While sharing some "brownies" with a young Renee Divine, he encourages her to reconsider her frayed relationship with Asa Buchanan, the love of her life. Back in 2008, Moe proposes to Noelle, who accepts. In late 2008, an engaged Moe and Noelle visit Viki at the Buenos Dias Café, Carlotta Vega's burned-down diner rebuilt as a recreation of the Bon Jour Café. Dorian Lord invites Moe to be her personal chef, and he accepts. Later, as part of her plot to marry or gain power-of-attorney over Buchanan heir David, Dorian gives Moe her house and its contents. Moe and Noelle soon marry in Las Vegas on February 9, 2009.

== Spencer Truman ==
Spencer Truman
- One Life to Live character
- Portrayed by: Paul Satterfield (2005–2007); Austin Williams (2008)
- Duration: 2005–2008
- First appearance: May 25, 2005
- Last appearance: August 22, 2008
- Created by: Dena Higley
- Introduced by: Frank Valentini
In-universe information
- Occupation: Surgeon at Llanview Hospital
- Parents: Ned Truman; Emma Bradley
- Half-brothers: David Vickers
- Spouse: Paige Miller
- Sons: Hugh Hughes

Spencer Truman is a fictional character from the soap opera One Life to Live. He was played by Paul Satterfield from May 25, 2005, to January 30, 2007. Satterfield reprised the role in the form of a ghost several times in 2007. Austin Williams played a young Spencer in a 2008 storyline in which the characters Bo and Rex find themselves in 1968.

Dr. Spencer Truman comes to Llanview, Pennsylvania, in 2005; his younger brother, David Vickers, and ex-wife, Paige Miller, are furious to have him back in their lives. They are determined to find a way to get him out of town, but Spencer makes it clear he is not going anywhere.

Spencer performs an operation on Jack Manning that saves the boy's life. Spencer befriends Jack's mother, Blair Cramer, and the two become romantically involved. Blair, however, is still emotionally wrapped up with her ex-husband, Todd Manning. Obsessed with winning Blair's love, Spencer frames Todd for the murder of Margaret Cochran. Throughout Todd's murder trial, Spencer makes Blair question Todd's innocence and seduces her. Todd is convicted of murder and sent to death row. He is actually executed and declared dead when John McBain appears with Margaret, who is actually still alive. Spencer is able to revive Todd. In addition to faking Margaret's death, Spencer had secretly delivered her son, whose biological father is Todd. Spencer blackmailed Paige into helping him and keeping the secret. Spencer had put Todd and Margaret's baby up for adoption, with the boy being adopted by Michael and Marcie McBain, who were unaware of his origins. Spencer had also murdered John's father, Thomas McBain, twenty-five years earlier and had convinced both David and Paige that they had been complicit.

Spencer's true motivation for returning to Llanview is revealed to be a vendetta against Asa Buchanan. David and Spencer's mother, Emma Bradley-Truman, had been one of Renee Divine's bordello girls, and on her deathbed had told Spencer that Asa was his biological father. Spencer vows to destroy Asa's family. Eventually, Blair catches on to Spencer's crimes, and after Todd's failed execution, becomes determined to redeem herself and stop Spencer once and for all. She spies on Spencer, drugging him and recording their conversations in hopes that he will slip up and incriminate himself. Ultimately, Blair and John succeed in getting Spencer jailed. He confronts Asa about his paternity, but a DNA test shows that he is not Asa's son. Spencer appears to suffer a psychological breakdown. He makes an insanity plea, fooling his court-appointed psychiatrist, Marty Saybrooke, into believing that he is unfit to stand trial. Todd abducts Spencer, planning to torture him for information about his missing son, but ends up sending Spencer and Blair off a building rooftop by accident. While recuperating in the hospital, Spencer descends deeper into his own private obsession. He sneaks into Blair's hospital room, drugging her, but is murdered. The killer is ultimately revealed to be Lindsay Rappaport, who had killed Spencer to protect Marcie from losing her adopted son should the truth ever come out that he is actually Todd's son.

After Spencer's death, Miles Laurence, the younger brother of Mitch Laurence, comes to town. Miles had been a longtime patient of Spencer, whose surgical genius had fixed Miles' grotesquely deformed facial features. Miles, having lived his entire life in hospitals and institutions, believed Spencer to be his only friend. He listens to Spencer's posthumous messages and follows Spencer's instructions to take revenge on Spencer's enemies. Miles has Todd assaulted and abducted, and he keeps the secret of Tommy McBain's paternity. After Miles' scheme to force Marty to become his wife falls apart, Miles realizes the extent of Spencer's misdeeds and gives up Spencer's final secret, revealing to Blair that Tommy is Todd and Margaret's missing son.

== Jamie Vega ==
Jamie Vega
- One Life to Live character
- Portrayed by: Darryn and Leah Thompson (2003–05) Saoirse Scott (2005–09)
- Duration: 2003–09
- First appearance: February 10, 2003
- Last appearance: March 25, 2009
- Created by: Josh Griffith
- Introduced by: Frank Valentini
In-universe information
- Parents: Antonio Vega; Keri Reynolds
- Grandparents: R. J. Gannon; Liz Coleman Reynolds; Diego Vega (legal); Carlotta Vega (legal); Manuel Santi
- Aunts and uncles: Adriana Cramer; Tico Santi; Cristian Vega (legal)

Jamie Reynolds Vega (born Stephanie Reynolds) is a fictional character on the American soap opera, One Life to Live. Child actors Darryn and Leah Thompson originated the roles as infants from February 10, 2003, until March 8, 2005. Saoirse Scott stepped in the speaking role from April 8, 2005, until March 25, 2009.

Jamie is the daughter of Antonio Vega and Keri Reynolds; although she is at first believed to be the child of Keri's mother Liz and another man, the embryo transplanted into Keri. The baby is born and soon determined to actually be the biological child of Keri and her boyfriend Antonio. She is later renamed Jamie.

Following Keri's death, Jamie is the subject of a fierce custody battle between her father and maternal grandfather, R.J. Gannon. Jessica Buchanan acts as a mother to Jamie during Jessica's long relationship with Antonio, and nearly adopts Jamie before she and Antonio split up. In April 2007, Jamie runs out of Antonio and Jessica's loft as they are arguing. Outside, Jamie runs through Angel Square, and is hit by a car. Jamie makes a full recovery. After Antonio and Jessica's break up, Antonio leaves town, taking Jamie with him.

== Langston Wilde ==
Langston Wilde
- One Life to Live character
- Portrayed by: Brittany Underwood
- Duration: 2006–2012
- First appearance: May 17, 2006
- Last appearance: January 13, 2012
- Created by: Dena Higley
- Introduced by: Frank Valentini
In-universe information
- Other names: Langston Wilde-Cramer
- Occupation: Screenwriter
- Family: Cramer (adoptive)
- Parents: Broderick Wilde; Linda Montez Wilde
- Adoptive mother: Dorian Cramer Lord
- Half-sisters: Cassie Callison (adoptive); Adriana Cramer (adoptive)
- Aunts and uncles: Ray Montez; Addie Cramer (adoptive); Melinda Cramer (adoptive)
- Nephews: River Carpenter (adoptive)
- First cousins: Lola Montez; Blair Cramer (adoptive); Kelly Cramer (adoptive); Paul Cramer (adoptive)
- Other relatives: Starr Manning (adoptive); Jack Manning (adoptive); Sam Manning (adoptive); Hope Manning-Thornhart (goddaughter)

Langston Wilde was portrayed by Brittany Underwood from May 17, 2006, to April 12, 2011. Langston is Dorian Lord's adoptive daughter and very similar to her. In January 2011, it was announced that Underwood would be exiting the show in the spring in a "storyline dictated" exit. She was slated to appear in the Vicker Man premiere episodes alongside Markko in July 2011 but could not due to scheduling conflicts. She made a return appearance during the final ABC episode of the show on January 13, 2012.

Langston is first seen while Starr Manning is being bullied by classmates from school. The two soon become best friends. Starr jumps off of a cliff at the stone quarry to take a dive into the water below. Before landing in the water, Starr hits her head and is taken to the hospital, where she fakes amnesia. Langston learns of Starr's ruse to try to reunite her parents. Starr soon comes clean with her parents about faking amnesia.

Langston and Starr begin high school, where the two gain an enemy in Britney Jennings. Starr soon meets a football player named Cole Thornhart, and they begin dating. Britney, who has a crush on Cole, desperately tries several times to break the two up. Starr and Cole go into a bedroom during a party, and refusing to have sex, Starr is frightened when an angry Cole tears the room apart and rips Starr's shirt. Britney poses as Starr as she calls the police on Cole, who later arrest him. Langston quickly turns on Cole, who has been kicked off of the football team for using steroids.

Starr is horrified to learn that Cole's mother is Marty Saybrooke, the woman that her father Todd had raped several years earlier; Starr is able to forgive Cole, but her parents forbid the two from seeing one another. Langston soon forgives Cole for hurting her friend. Cole and Starr, desperate to be together, decide to run away with the help of Langston. Todd catches the two before they leave, nearly strangling Cole. For Cole's safety, Starr breaks up with him.

Langston signs Starr up for the school musical, and Starr in turn sets Langston up to write the musical. Working with English teacher Marcie McBain, the musical is a success, and Langston soon begins dating Markko Rivera, a boy who annoys her.

A few months into their relationship, Markko becomes concerned about the constant absence of Langston's parents. Sensing that something is not right, Starr's aunt, Dorian hires private investigator Rex Balsom to dig up information on Langston. Dorian learns that Langston has been orphaned and living on her own for over a year.

Langston cannot believe that Dorian would pry into private information regarding her life. During a conversation at school, Langston talks with Starr about her parents' death, and they are overheard by Britney. Britney contacts Social Services, and Langston is horrified when she is placed in foster care. Starr's mother, Blair, is all set to become Langston's foster mother when she is called out of town. In turn, Dorian chooses to become Langston's guardian. After things are official, Langston moves into Dorian's home and happily continues her relationship with Markko.

After Starr becomes pregnant with Cole's baby, she decides to have an abortion before Cole or her family discover that she is pregnant. At the last minute, Langston gives Cole the address where Starr is. Cole stops Starr from aborting their baby, telling her to take the time to think of what is best. Cole and Starr, with fake ID's, run away to Virginia Beach.

Dorian catches Langston trying to hide a pregnancy book and suspects that Langston is pregnant; Dorian takes Langston to have an abortion. Langston decides to tell Dorian the truth. Cole and Starr are soon found and brought back to Llanview.

In August 2008, Clint Buchanan hatches a plan to get the family business (Buchanan Enterprises) back from Dorian. Clint sends Jared to Colombia to bring Langston's long-lost uncle Ray Montez to Llanview. During this time, Dorian makes the decision to adopt Langston. On Christmas Day 2008, Dorian becomes her adoptive mother.

Langston forms a bond with her cousin, Lola, who develops a crush on Markko. Once Langston puts an end to Lola's schemes, she makes plans with Markko to have sex on prom night. After learning of their plans, Lola sabotages the French condoms given to Langston by Dorian. While high on LSD, Lola admits to what she has done, and Dorian stops Langston and Markko from using the condoms.

Using Markko's condoms, Langston and Markko enjoy their first night together. Unfortunately, their happiness does not last long when, at their graduation party, drunk Dorian tells Markko's conservative and religious parents that he and Langston had sex. Both furious, his parents forbid Markko to see her, even though he is 18, as they believe she is a bad influence on him.

When Markko refuses to break up with Langston, they disown him, which puts a strain on his and Langston's relationship, even as they attempt to work through it. When they do, they move in with Starr and Cole.

A man from Markko's past, teacher's assistant named Robert Ford, begins making moves on Langston. They kiss twice and on March 1, 2010, they have sex for the first time. This has been going on for a month. She seems to like having sex with Ford. Starr later finds out, because Ford left their house and Starr noted that Langston was acting weird. This along with fact that Starr had found an empty condom wrapper on the floor.

Starr agrees not to tell Markko about Langston and Ford's affair. Langston does not know which man she will keep, but it is looking like she is ready to break up with Markko to be with Ford, to Starr's disdain. In April, Langston tells Starr that she is breaking up with Ford to stay with Markko. However, when Langston goes to see Ford, she tells him that she lied to Starr and will continue to have sex with him while dating Markko.

On prom night, Markko catches Ford and Langston in an embrace and learns of their affair. He angrily confronts both of them, punches Ford, and leaves Langston. Markko leaves town to go to UCLA in July 2010, and temporarily returns to town in fall of 2010 to help his father, who undergoes heart surgery. Langston nearly pursues a relationship with Ford but quickly ends in after learning that he slept with a mentally incapacitated Jessica Buchanan.

During Markko's temporary return, he and Langston forgive each other and start to form a friendship. However, they are not successful in trying to get back together, and Markko leaves town again for UCLA, leaving Langston behind.

On April 11, 2011, Langston is shown to be somewhat happier since her breakup with Ford. Markko returns from LA, and Dorian tells her that she wants her to work on the David Vickers film with him. On April 12, 2011, Langston shares one last sad moment with Starr, promises they will see each other someday, and leaves for California with Markko.

Langston appears on the final episode on January 13, 2012, in California with Starr and Markko. She is first seen mourning the death of Ford, when Cole arrives and gives them a hug. She assures Starr and Cole that everything will be alright.

On the March 20, 2013, episode of General Hospital, a frantic Langston calls Starr to return to Los Angeles. It remains unknown what Langston's reason was for wanting Starr to return.

== Evangeline Williamson ==
Evangeline Williamson
- One Life to Live character
- Portrayed by: Renée Elise Goldsberry
- Duration: 2003–2007
- First appearance: February 25, 2003
- Last appearance: May 18, 2007
- Created by: Josh Griffith
- Introduced by: Frank Valentini
In-universe information
- Occupation: Lawyer
- Parents: Clarence Williamson; Lisa Williamson
- Sisters: Layla Williamson
- Uncles: Clay Willamson

Evangeline Williamson is a fictional character on the ABC soap opera, One Life to Live. She was portrayed by Renée Elise Goldsberry beginning on February 25, 2003, and she appeared continually until May 18, 2007. Goldsberry was nominated for two consecutive Daytime Emmy Awards for Best Supporting Actress for the role in 2006 and 2007. She was also nominated for two NAACP Image Awards for Best Actress in a Daytime Drama Series in 2004 and 2007. In 2020, Candace Young and Charlie Mason from Soaps She Knows put Evangeline on their list of Daytime's Most Important African-American Characters, calling Goldsberry "the future Tony winner [who] struck one match after another as the Llanview lawyer whose case we never wanted to be closed." In 2024, Stephanie Holland from The Root placed Evangeline on her list of the most memorable black characters from American soap operas, writing, "Before she was one of "Hamilton"'s Schuyler sisters, Renée Elise Goldsberry played Evangeline Williamson, Llanview's most badass lawyer. She was smart, firect, funny and beautiful. Unfortunately, she never got her own love story and always seemed to picking up other characters' scraps. When the time came for Goldsberry to move on to Tony-winning stardom, she ended up in a coma and was written off."

Evangeline arrives in Llanview in 2003 as the attorney for Mitch Laurence and later for Keri Reynolds. She soon begins dating R.J. Gannon. They have a series of spats over Evangeline's focus on her work and her closeness with Police Lieutenant John McBain. She and R.J. eventually split after Evangeline and John succumb to passion and make love. Evangeline enters into a romantic relationship with John in which they proclaim there are "no strings attached." However, Evangeline eventually realizes that she wants more of a commitment. She tells John that she loves him, but a conflicted John is unable to reciprocate due to his unresolved feelings for Natalie Buchanan. Evangeline breaks things off.

Evangeline's younger sister Layla comes to town in 2005. Later, Evangeline helps free Cristian Vega from an unjust conviction to Death Row. Their close friendship turns to romance. During a tornado, Evangeline is blinded, and Cristian helps her through months of rehabilitation, during which time their love blossoms.

As his attorney and unlikely friend, Evangeline stands by Todd Manning when he is framed for murder by Spencer Truman. Todd takes a proactive role in saving Evangeline's eyesight, believing her to be the only true friend he has left in Llanview after his own brush with death. Todd interferes in Cristian and Evangeline's relationship and, over time, insinuates that he has his own romantic intentions. Cristian, meanwhile, is put off by Todd and Evangeline's closeness, and by Todd's disrespect for his own relationship with Evangeline. During his search for his son, Todd is led to believe his child had died, and in an emotional moment, kisses Evangeline. Evangeline admits to Cristian that she has kissed Todd, and Cristian breaks it off.

Months later, Cristian and Evangeline repair their friendship, while Evangeline remains close to Todd. Evangeline and Cristian are separately targeted by the white supremacist group One Pure People, and both are gassed at Cristian's loft. Evangeline lapses into a coma, ultimately transferred out of town to a critical care facility.

In December, 2007, Evangeline's mother Lisa Williamson moves her back to the family home in Maryland. Cristian, still struggling with his unresolved feelings for Evangeline, visits her, hoping to find closure. After making his peace with Evangeline, Cristian asks her for a sign that he should move on with his life. Cristian gets his answer when the comatose Evangeline's hand slips from his grasp. Later, Cristian and Layla visit to announce their engagement and learn that Evangeline is back in the hospital. Eventually, Evangeline dies after being taken off life support.

== Layla Williamson ==
Layla Williamson
- One Life to Live character
- Portrayed by: Tika Sumpter
- Duration: 2005–11
- First appearance: July 15, 2005
- Last appearance: January 24, 2011
- Created by: Dena Higley
- Introduced by: Frank Valentini
In-universe information
- Occupation: Fashion designer at Exposed; Secretary at the Llanview Police Department; Secretary at Buchanan Enterprises
- Parents: Clarence Williamson; Lisa Williamson
- Sisters: Evangeline Williamson
- Aunts and uncles: Clay Williamson

Layla Williamson is a fictional character on the American daytime soap opera One Life to Live. Actress Tika Sumpter portrayed the role of Layla from July 15, 2005, through September 14, 2010. Sumpter reappeared in the role November 9–10, 2010, and January 21 and 24, 2011. For her portrayal of Layla, Sumpter was nominated for an NAACP Image Award for Best Actress in a Daytime Drama Series in 2008.

Layla arrives in Llanview in 2005 to live with her sister, Evangeline "Vange" Williamson after pursuing an acting career in Los Angeles. She quickly gets a job as a waitress at Capricorn nightclub, then owned by Antonio Vega. Antonio and Layla become friends, and Layla moves in with Antonio while he is engaged in a custody battle for his daughter Jamie Vega with her maternal grandfather R.J. Gannon. Layla pretends to be Antonio's girlfriend and the two gain him full custody of her.

In 2007, Layla co-founds the Exposed fashion line with Adriana Cramer. They soon hire former baseball player Tate Harmon as a model. Layla is devastated when Evangeline falls into a coma following a deadly hate crime instigated by Tate. Tate eventually holds Layla and Vincent, Adriana and Rex Balsom hostage on the rooftop of the Palace Hotel. They are rescued by police officer Talia Sahid.

In 2007, Layla and Talia move in together after Evangeline's condition remains unchanged, along with Sarah Roberts. By 2009, Sarah leaves town and Talia dies, leading Cristian and Oliver "Fish" Fish to move in to offset Layla's housing costs. After a one-night stand, Layla begins to date Fish, but begins to believe that he might be gay. While at the gym, Layla encounters Kyle Lewis, and begins to suspect that Fish and Kyle had a romantic relationship. When Layla shares her suspicion with fellow roommate Cristian, Cristian tells Layla he encountered the two kissing outside of the gym. At the apartment, Fish arrives home with a bottle of wine ready to celebrate their relationship. But, Layla rebuffs his advances and the two end their brief romance.

In June 2010, Cristian and Layla engage to marry, and in July, visit Layla's mother Lisa Williamson to share the news. They travel to Maryland to visit Lisa and face tragedy when Evangeline falls ill. After a final eulogizing testimonial to her comatose sister, Layla and her mother remove Evangeline from life support and she dies.

In the late fall of 2010, Layla and Cris are forced to postpone their engagement as Layla gets an offer to work in Paris with Adriana Cramer. Layla and Cris struggle with their long-distance romance. While in Paris on a business meeting, Cris and Layla are reunited, but after a brief resumption of their romance, decide to call their engagement off with Layla remaining in Paris.

== Others ==
Character	Date(s)	Actor	Storylines
Seth Anderson	May 2001 – January 2003	Brandon Routh (2001–02); Steve Richard Harris (2002–03)	Seth comes to town with the intent of befriending Jessica Buchanan. He is the accomplice and lover of Natalie Balsom, who is later revealed to be a Buchanan. Seth is also an old friend of Cristian Vega from Angel Square. Seth is supposed to get close to Jessica in order to facilitate introducing Natalie to the family, but falls for her instead, causing tension between the sisters. Seth leaves town after his relationship with Jessica fails.
Chad Bennett	August 2001 – November 2002	Teddy Sears	Chad Bennett is a friend and classmate of Jessica Buchanan at Llanview University. He also works with Blair Cramer at The Sun.
Zane Buchanan	October 31, 2006 – December 14, 2006	Jack Ferrantini	Zane is the son of Kelly Cramer and Duke Buchanan. Zane is conceived during the tornado that takes the life of his father, Duke, and is later born severely premature. Kevin and Kelly soon leave town together for London, taking baby Zane with them. Upon Kelly's return to Llanview in 2010, it is stated that Zane is attending boarding school in London.
Betsy Cramer	November 11, 2003 – February 2004	Lois Smith	Betsy Cramer is Dorian Lord's aunt.
Phylicia Evans	September 10, 2009 – January 13, 2012	Tonye Patano	Phylicia Evans (née Wenton) is the mother of Greg Evans and Shaun Evans, and the grandmother of Destiny Evans.
Richard Evans	September 10, 2009 – January 13, 2012	Frankie Faison	Richard Evans is the father of Greg Evans and Shaun Evans, and the grandfather of Destiny Evans.
Jared Hall	February 3 – May 2000	Herve Clermont	Jared Hall is son of Josh Hall, and adoptive grandson of long-running characters Ed Hall and Carla Gray.
Kirk Harmon	May 21, 2007 – July 10, 2007	Randolph Mantooth	The father of ex-baseball superstar Tate Harmon, comes to Llanview to see his son; the two share a secret. Just when it seems that Kirk is the anti-semitic and racist arsonist who has been terrorizing the city, Kirk confronts Tate, who is the real killer. Kirk takes the blame for Tate's crimes to protect his son, but when he realizes that Tate will not stop his misguided crusade, Kirk decides to tell the truth to the police. Before he has the chance, Kirk is killed in prison by a member of Tate's white supremacist group "One Pure People."
Leah Joplin	August 20 – December 4, 2008; March 29, 2010	Maureen Mueller	In August 2008, Todd Manning had visited Dr. Joplin and blackmailed her into helping him steal his daughter Starr Manning's child after the birth rather than let Starr put the baby up for adoption. Todd had discovered that as a teen, a drug-addicted Schuyler had stolen drugs from Llanview Hospital, and that Dr. Joplin had covered it up. Dr. Joplin capitulates to Todd's demands after failing to convince him to change his mind, in order to protect her career. However, the infant is switched at birth with Jessica Buchanan's daughter, who had been stillborn due to Rh disease. Thinking she had failed to diagnose the easily treated syndrome and caused the newborn's death, Dr. Joplin shoots herself in her office and dies on December 4, 2008. In 2010, it is revealed that Allison Perkins had switched infants Schuyler Joplin and Rex Balsom and tried to convince Roxy Balsom that the baby she'd given birth to had died the night he was born, while she gave Schuyler to her sister, Leah, who could not conceive children of her own.
Stella Lipschitz	2002 – 2003	Sylvia Miles	Stella is the mother of Roxy Balsom and grandmother of Rex Balsom.
Emily MacIver	June 2002 – February 2003	Amber Ryan	Emily is the younger sister of Colin MacIver and Troy MacIver.
Melanie MacIver	March 31, 2000 – October 19, 2001	Darlene Vogel	Melanie is the ex-wife of Colin MacIver, and sister of Lindsay Rappaport. She has a brief romantic relationship with Bo Buchanan.
Shannon McBain	March 2 – December 2, 2004	Danneel Harris	Shannon McBain is John and Michael McBain's cousin, and a student at Llanview University. Shannon helps to rebuild the community center after a fire. Shannon is an outsider and is blamed for continued vandalism on the project. Shannon is caught in bed with River Carpenter by his girlfriend, Adriana Cramer. However, Shannon begins dating Rex Balsom, though their relationship fails. Shannon leaves after being put into police protection.
Lola Montez	October 3, 2008 – May 15, 2009	Camila Banus	Lola is the daughter of Ray Montez. She develops an unhealthy fixation on Markko Rivera and schemes to break up his relationship with Langston Wilde.
Vanessa Montez	September 15, 2008 – February 26, 2009	Jacqueline Hendy	Vanessa is the ex-wife of Ray Montez, and step-mother to Lola Montez. She marries Cristian Vega in order to avoid deportation back to Colombia.
Ted Osbourne	August 11 – November 2, 2006	Mike Jerome	Ted is an employee of Vincent Jones who is later killed in a warehouse fire started by Tate Harmon. Actor Mike Jerome received the role of Ted Osbourne after winning I Wanna Be a Soap Star 3.
Mr. Pravat	2006	Alan Muraoka	Mr. Pravat was a Thai bartender. Sesame Street actor Alan Muraoka made a guest appearance in a bar scene along with Desiree Casado in 2006.
Tico Santi	July 7 – December 8, 2004	Javier Morga	Augustico is first seen when Antonio finds him imprisoned by a drug gang and he is taken to Llanview. Tico finds out he is Antonio's cousin and they build a relationship and also dates Jessica Buchanan. Tico and sister Sonia are hiding their mother Isabella Santi in their home. Tico hires Antonio's brother Christian to kill him. He later marries Jessica, though Christian fails to kill Antonio and reveals the truth. Tico is then murdered.
Mark Solomon	July 2, 2004 – June 3, 2005	Matt Cavenaugh	Mark is a student at Llanview University who is assigned to help rebuild the community center after a fire. Mark and Marcie Walsh become good friends, and Mark comes out to her. Mark later tells the rest of the group that he is gay, and he begins dating a boy named Justin. Months later, Daniel Colson marries Nora Hanen, though it appears that he is having an affair. With the murder of Paul Cramer still unsolved, the motive is revealed: Paul had discovered that Daniel is romantically involved with Mark, and had begun to blackmail Daniel. This prompted Daniel to first kill Paul, and then Jennifer Rappaport. Bo Buchanan and Rex Balsom discover Daniel's crimes and the affair. While Daniel is in custody awaiting trial, Mark breaks things off with him and leaves Llanview.
Tillie	May 2002 – January 2003	Heather MacRae	Tillie is an inmate at Statesville Prison who torments Lindsay Rappaport when she is incarcerated.
Sonia Toledo	June 24 – December 3, 2004	Lisa Lo Cicero	Sonia is a federal agent with relations with the Santi clan. She begins an affair with Antonio Vega and is involved in his storyline. She leaves Llanview after Tico is murdered.
Ron Walsh	2003–2004, 2005, October 2007	Timothy Adams	Ron Walsh is the brother of Marcie Walsh McBain.
Lisa Williamson	March 28, 2005 – July 26, 2010	Janet Hubert	Lisa Williamson is the mother of Evangeline Williamson and Layla Williamson.

== See also ==
- List of One Life to Live characters
