= Michael McBain =

- One Life to Live character
- Chris Stack as Michael McBain
- Portrayed by: R. Brandon Johnson (2003–2004); Nathaniel Marston (2004–2007); Robert Harte (2007); Chris Stack (2007–2011)
- Duration: 2003–2009, 2011
- First appearance: November 2003
- Last appearance: October 28, 2011
- Created by: Josh Griffith and Michael Malone
- Introduced by: Frank Valentini
- Nathaniel Marston as Michael McBain
In-universe information
- Occupation: Physician
- Parents: Thomas McBain; Eve McBain
- Siblings: John McBain; Theresa
- Spouse: Marcie Walsh (2006–present)
- Children: Gabriel McBain; Unnamed child
- Nephews: Liam McBain
- First cousins: Shannon McBain

Michael McBain is a fictional character from the ABC soap opera One Life to Live.

== Casting ==
The role was originated by R. Brandon Johnson in November 2003. Nathaniel Marston stepped in on February 16, 2004, and ultimately left on November 29, 2007. On January 9 and 10, 2007, Robert Harte temporarily filled in for Marston as Michael. Chris Stack took over the role from December 3, 2007, to June 17, 2009, later making a guest appearance from July 14 through July 16, 2009, and on November 12 and 13, 2009. Michael returned on October 25, 27, 28, 2011.

Marston originally played the role of Al Holden from 2001 to 2004. Al was romantically involved with Marcie Walsh; when Al was killed off, fans of the couple organized a write-in campaign calling for Marston's return. Marston later returned to the series in a storyline in which Al's "spirit" helped Michael change his selfish ways and win Marcie's heart. Johnson and Marston alternated in the role of Michael as Al's spirit sometimes "took control" of Michael. At the conclusion of the story on February 16, 2004, Al's spirit took over Michael's body permanently and lost all memory of Al's life; Marston assumed the role full-time with no mention of Al's spirit being inside Michael's body. To the viewer Michael looked like Al, but presumably to everyone else he looked like he did before Al's spirit got inside him.

== Storylines ==
Dr. McBain worked at Llanview Hospital and is the brother of Detective John McBain and husband of Marcie Walsh (whom he married on May 5, 2006). He and Marcie adopted an abandoned baby boy whom they named Tommy McBain.

Michael was told by Rex Balsom that the baby was really the missing son of Todd Manning. When Dr. Spencer Truman is murdered, Rex, who ran into Michael at the hospital on the night of Spencer Truman's murder, believed Michael was the one who stabbed Spencer to prevent him from revealing the paternity of Tommy to Todd Manning (Spencer had kidnapped Tommy, who was really the child of Todd Manning and Margaret Cochran on the day of his birth); Michael believed Rex had committed the murder for the same reason. However, after John had Rex and Michael held overnight in a holding cell for questioning because he believed they were hiding something and wondered what the two could possibly be keeping secret between them, they talked it out and discovered that neither of them had killed Truman.

Michael kept the truth about Tommy's parentage from Marcie. When the truth of Tommy's parentage came to light, Michael had been arrested for perjury. He skipped bail when he went to Paris, Texas with Charlie Banks in order to try to find Marcie (who had left town with Tommy after Todd had been awarded custody of his son, whom he called Sam).

Michael was arrested and bought back, but eventually returned to Texas with his brother John. The authorities followed, and a crazed Marcie took Viki Davidson hostage in the stand-off. Michael took Viki's place as Marcie's hostage and convinced her to give up Sam and return to Llanview.

Todd's pregnant teenage daughter Starr Manning gave her unborn baby up for adoption and chose Marcie and Michael as the adoptive parents. Michael suspected that Todd would attempt to thwart the adoption and feared that Marcie could not survive losing another child. Michael and Marcie separated, but Starr was determined to have Marcie to adopt her baby, married or not. When Starr gave birth on November 6, 2008, Todd had intended to kidnap the child and raise it in secret but changed his mind at the last minute. Meanwhile, after losing her own baby in childbirth on the same day, Starr's cousin Jessica Brennan — during an episode of her recurring dissociative identity disorder — switched Starr's living daughter with her own deceased baby girl, causing everyone to believe that Starr's child, Hope, had died. Seven months later, the truth about the baby switch came out and Hope was returned on June 5, 2009; Michael and Marcie finally assumed a few days later. After overhearing Starr talking about her regrets, Marcie returned Hope to Starr. Michael tells Marcie about an exciting job offer at Seattle Grace Hospital, and they decide to leave Llanview and start over. While Waiting for a cab to pick them up on June 17, 2009, they were overjoyed when a home pregnancy test reveals that Marcie is pregnant.

Michael briefly returned in July 2009 to help Rex and Gigi prove that Stacy was not Shane's stem cell donor before he returned to Seattle to be with Marcie where she gave birth to their son, whom they name Gabriel Thomas, on November 13, 2009.

Michael and Marcie returned on October 25, 2011, to surprise John that Marcie was six months pregnant with their second child.
