= Storylines of Todd Manning =

- One Life to Live character
- Portrayed by: Roger Howarth (1993–2003, 2011–2013); Trevor St. John (2003–2011)
- Duration: 1993–1998; 2000–2013
- First appearance: January 6, 1993
- Last appearance: August 5, 2013
- Created by: Michael Malone and Josh Griffith
- Introduced by: Linda Gottlieb (1993); Susan Bedsow Horgan (1996); Jill Farren Phelps (2000); Frank Valentini (2011–2012); Jennifer Pepperman (2013)
- Book appearances: Patrick's Notebook
- Crossover appearances: General Hospital
In-universe information
- Other names: Ted Lampley; Todd Lord
- Occupation: Media proprietor; Businessman; Editor-in-chief
- Family: Lord
- Father: Victor Lord
- Mother: Irene Manning
- Adoptive parents: Peter Manning; Barbara Jones
- Brothers: Victor Lord, Jr.
- Sisters: Tina Lord
- Half-brothers: Tony Lord
- Half-sisters: Victoria Lord; Meredith Lord
- Spouse: Blair Cramer (1995–1997, 2001–2002, 2013–present) (Note: The first ceremony for Todd and Blair was in February 1995. The marriage was annulled months later in August. The second marriage between them took place in November of the same year until their divorce in 1997. However, they were married consecutively from 1995–1997.); Téa Delgado (1997–1999) (Note: The first ceremony for Todd and Téa was on July 15, 1997. The marriage was annulled in 1998. The second marriage between them took place the same year until their divorce in 1999. However, they were married consecutively from 1997–99.)
- Sons: Jack Manning
- Daughters: Starr Manning; Danielle Manning
- Grandchildren: Hope Manning-Thornhart
- Grandparents: Albert Manning
- Aunts and uncles: Clayton-Powell Lord; Gwendolyn Lord Abbott
- Nieces and nephews: Megan Gordon; Brian Kendall; Daniel Wolek; Kevin Buchanan; Joey Buchanan; Jessica Buchanan; Natalie Buchanan; C. J. Roberts; Sarah Roberts; Sam Manning; Victor Lord III
- First cousins: Clayton-Powell Lord II; Richard Abbott
- Other relatives: Peter Manning; Martha Manning; Powell Lord III; Duke Buchanan; Kevin Buchanan Jr.; Megan Buchanan; Bree Brennan; Chloe Brennan; Ryder Ford; Liam McBain; Zane Buchanan

Thomas Todd Manning is a fictional character from the American daytime dramas One Life to Live (OLTL) and General Hospital (GH). Created by writers Michael Malone and Josh Griffith, the role was originated in 1993 by actor Roger Howarth. Todd was a college student and fraternity brother to Kevin Buchanan, Zach Rosen, and Powell Lord. In 1993, following a storyline in which he becomes acquainted with Marty Saybrooke (Susan Haskell), Todd initiates a gang rape of her with the help of Zach and Powell. At first, his lawyer, Nora Hanen (Hillary B. Smith), is sure of his innocence, but comes to realize that Todd is guilty and tricks him into confessing. He is sentenced to prison, but he manages to escape, and he is eventually paroled. It is discovered that Todd is the son of Victor Lord, and that he is the lost Lord heir, making him a wealthy man.

Todd has several romantic pairings and marriages throughout the years, including with Rebecca Lewis (Reiko Aylesworth), Blair Cramer (Kassie DePaiva), Téa Delgado (Florencia Lozano), and Carly Corinthos (Laura Wright). He has two children, Starr (Kristen Alderson) and Jack, and strengthens ties with his family, especially with his sister, Victoria "Viki" Lord (Erika Slezak).

Howarth left the role from time to time, the longest beginning in 2003; it was recast with Trevor St. John, physically altered by plastic surgery. In 2011, Howarth returned to OLTL, when it was disclosed that Todd had been taken hostage, and St. John's version of the character was actually Todd's identical twin brother, Victor Lord, Jr., who had been conditioned to assume Todd's place.

== Storylines ==
=== 1993–2003 ===
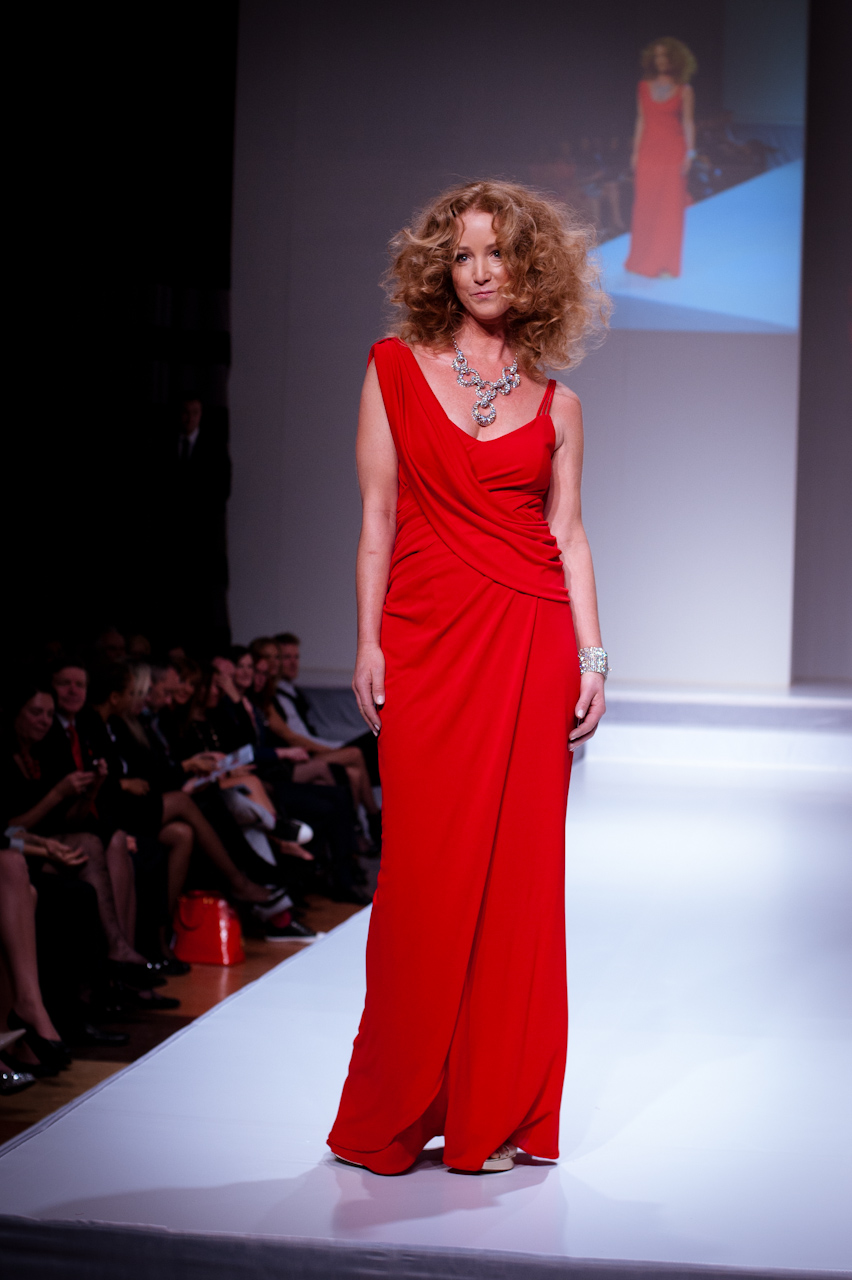
Susan Haskell (2012), who played Marty Saybrooke

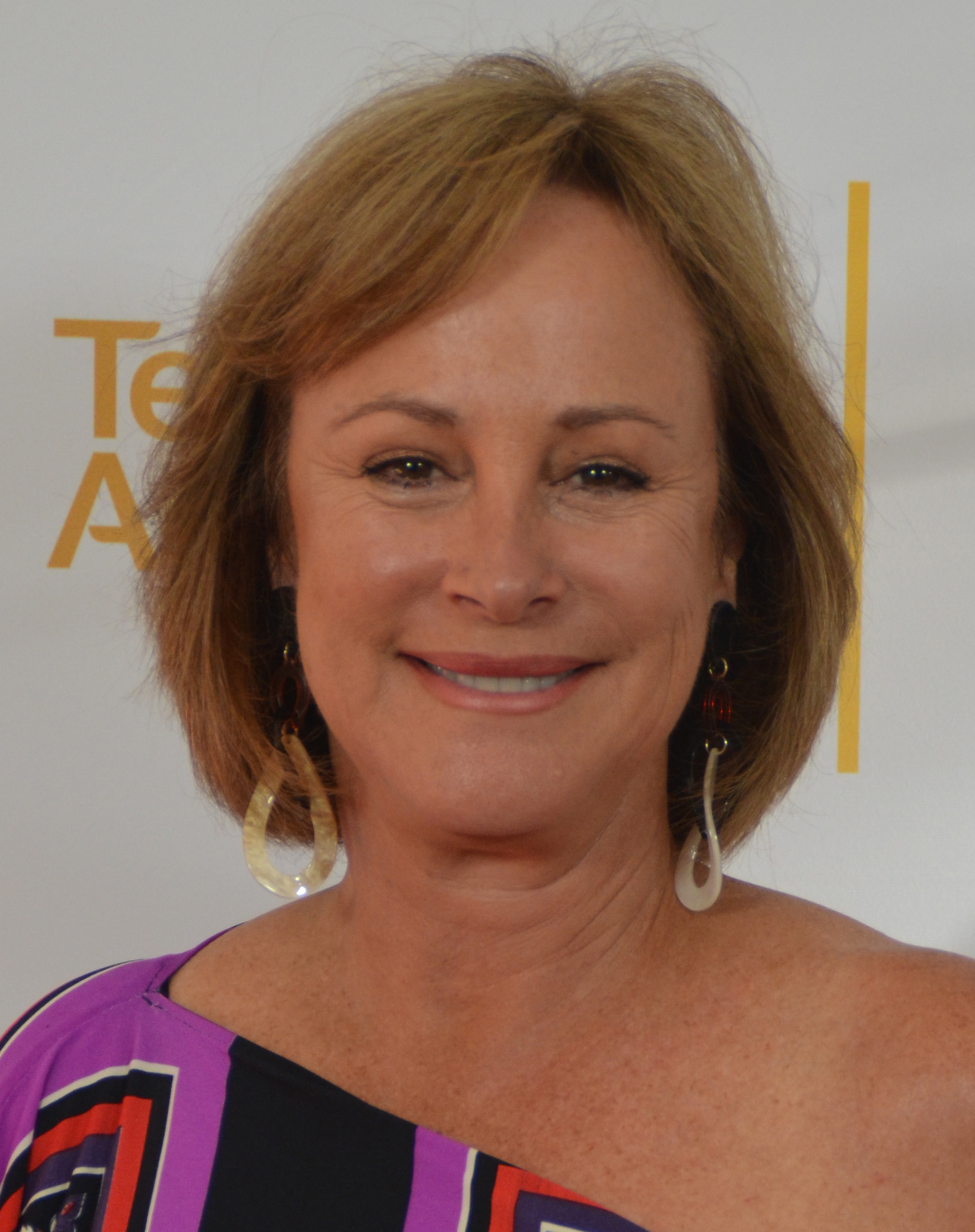
Hillary B. Smith (2014) as Nora Hanen

In 1993, Todd, a defensive back for Llanview, Pennsylvania University's football team, has a one-night stand with fellow student, Marty Saybrooke (Susan Haskell). After she tutors him for a calculus exam and he fails it, which results in his suspension from the football team, he blames her. In March 1993, Todd and his fraternity brothers, Zach Rosen and Powell Lord, rape Marty in Kevin's dorm room.

Todd hires attorney Nora Hanen (Hillary B. Smith), who believes in his innocence until a woman named Carol Swift reveals Todd also raped her; Nora causes a mistrial. Todd continues to torment Marty, including by attempting to rape her for a second time, but she eventually tricks Todd into confessing, sending him, Zach, and Powell to prison. Per Marty's testimony that Powell, who was peer pressured into raping her, is remorseful, Powell receives a lighter sentence (one year with the possibility of parole in three months) compared to Todd and Zach's eight years with the possibility of parole in four years. This spurs on Todd's need for revenge. While in prison, he befriends Rebecca Lewis (Reiko Aylesworth) and attends counseling sessions.

Todd and Rebecca develop romantic feelings for each other, and Todd convinces Rebecca to help him escape prison. He is stabbed in the chest with a pair of scissors by Nora when he goes after her for revenge. Officer Bo Buchanan (Robert S. Woods), Nora's love interest, rescues her from Todd. The two fight, but Todd manages to escape. In hiding, he is discovered by Marty and her boyfriend, Suede Pruitt. After accidentally killing Suede when they fight, he is shot by Bo; Todd falls into the Llantano River and is presumed dead.

Todd survives and hides at Llanfair, where he befriends two children, C. J. and Sarah Roberts. He is arrested when he jealously confronts Rebecca and Powell, who have recently become a couple. His prison van gets into an accident with another vehicle, and he rescues Marty, C. J., and Jessica (Erin Torpey) from the car. Todd gets early parole, and he continues to seek counseling. He is later accused of rape by several women. Marty reluctantly provides him with an alibi for one of the attacks. A deranged Powell, believing Todd is in his head, is later revealed as the serial rapist and kidnaps Rebecca. When Todd confronts him, making it so that Rebecca can escape, he kidnaps Todd and traumatizes him in similar ways to how he and his friends traumatized Marty. Todd overpowers Powell and is able to escape. After Powell is caught and arrested, Todd apologizes to Marty for all the pain he caused her, recognizing that he "was a monster".

He begins falling in love with Blair Cramer (Kassie DePaiva) after meeting her in a bar. In December 1994, Peter Manning dies, and Todd learns he is adopted. Conman David Vickers (Tuc Watkins) discovers that Todd's biological parents are Victor Lord and Irene Manning. With help from Todd's biological sister, Tina, David claims to be the lost Lord heir, but Todd's true parentage is ultimately revealed, leaving Todd $27.8 million richer. He purchases The National Intruder, a tabloid paper from Dorian Lord (Robin Strasser) and relaunches it as The Sun, a direct rival to his newfound family's newspaper, The Banner. In 1995, Blair tricks Todd into marriage by faking a pregnancy. She later learns that she really is pregnant, but after being mugged, she miscarries. Todd discovers she initially lied about her pregnancy and has the marriage annulled. When Blair becomes pregnant again, they remarry in November 1995.

Although they are happy, Blair dislikes Todd's consistent concern for Marty. He goes to Ireland to give Marty a flight back to Llanview. Her friend, Patrick Thornhart (Thorsten Kaye), is being hunted by Irish terrorists, so Todd, posing as Patrick, is shot and presumed dead. Blair blames Marty. Todd returns to Llanview in 1996, to find Blair in bed with Patrick. His sister, Victoria "Viki" Lord (Erika Slezak), introduces him to his daughter, Starr (Kristen Alderson), and Todd eventually resumes his life with Blair. They have many difficulties in their marriage, and Starr's diagnosis with aplastic anemia strains their marriage further.

Blair becomes pregnant with Patrick's baby, who has been identified as a donor match for Starr. She gives birth to his stillborn son in 1997. Todd blames Patrick for the miscarriage and frames him for the murder of billionaire Guy Armitage. Blair learns that Todd caused the explosion that killed Guy, and divorces him. When Blair falls into a coma, Todd pays lawyer Téa Delgado (Florencia Lozano) five million dollars to marry him so he can keep custody of Starr. When Blair awakens, he allows Blair visitation. In 1998, while Todd and Téa grow closer, Todd is again accused of rape; Blair and Sam Rappaport (Kale Browne), a lawyer and father-figure to Todd, help prove his innocence.

Back in town upon Todd's request, Sam intends to help Todd save his tempestuous marriage to Téa. In the interim, Todd and Blair grow closer, and Blair and Téa vie for Todd's affections. As Todd and Téa fall in love, Blair moves on with Sam. When Todd is about to be arrested for the murder of a woman named Georgie Phillips, he takes the other fourteen suspects hostage at the Buchanan family cabin with fake dynamite strapped to his chest. Rachel Gannon admits to the murder, but Todd is arrested for the hostage incident. He fakes dissociative identity disorder (multiple personalities) to avoid conviction and keep Téa in his life. Téa divorces him as part of his defense strategy, but they remarry. During the reception, a tape on which Todd confesses to faking his split personalities is accidentally played at Starr's request. Téa refuses his offer of another five million to stay married to him. He leaves town in December, and Tea has the marriage annulled in 1999.

In 2000, Todd keeps tabs on Téa, who starts dating Rachel's uncle, R. J. (Timothy Stickney). Out of jealousy, he almost kills R. J. and reveals himself to Téa, convincing her to leave town with him. When Téa dumps him, he returns months later without her. Todd and Blair grow close again. By framing Skye Chandler (Robin Christopher), he helps her cover up her shooting of Max Holden (James DePaiva). They decide to remarry, but the night before the wedding, a vengeful Max drugs Blair and leads Todd to believe they had sex. A furious Todd exposes Blair as Max's shooter. After burying Max alive to discover the truth, and soon afterward releasing him, he helps Blair stay out of jail by claiming she suffered a psychotic break. She is committed against her will. Months later, she goes to Mexico, knowing that she is pregnant with Todd's child. Todd follows, where he delivers their son. Believing the child is Max's, he gives the baby to David Vickers, and lets Blair think the baby died and was cremated soon afterward. During her grief, she and Todd reconcile, and she finally tells Todd that the child was really his. Todd locates the infant and claims the boy was abandoned, but Blair believes the child is a stranger. In December 2001, Todd convinces Blair to remarry him. They name their son John "Jack" Cramer Manning, and Todd makes it appear they have adopted him.

Jack develops aplastic anemia like Starr. This ultimately leads Sam to deduce that they are biological siblings and to inform Blair that Jack is her biological son. When he admits that he gave Jack away and forced her to grieve for a child that was never dead, she bans him from her life, and he reacts by becoming severely emotionally unstable. Blair leaves town with the children, but Todd follows her to Hawaii, where his plans to kidnap the children with help from Ross Rayburn (Shawn Christian) are foiled by Téa. Todd and Téa make love when they get stranded together on an island with Ross. Todd escapes to return to Blair and protects her when the Mafia comes after her because of her exposé on them in The Sun.

As Todd and Blair are about to remarry, Sam discloses that Todd, in an effort to win Blair's affections, staged a hit on their nanny, who had been presumed dead as a result of the Mafia's retaliation. Todd had used the nanny's "death" as an excuse for Blair to stay with him, later staging a hit on Blair's life, with him as the rescuer. The wedding is called off, and Blair distances herself from Todd. Soon afterward, Mitch Laurence (Roscoe Born) kidnaps Starr. Blair exchanges her own life for her daughter's. Todd rescues Blair by kidnapping his niece, Natalie (Melissa Archer), and exchanging her life for Blair's. Natalie is rescued, and Todd comes face to face with a frail Victor before he finally dies from heart failure. Mitch kidnaps Todd and locks him in Victor's crypt in order to frame him for Sam Rappaport's murder. Todd disappears from the crypt, and Blair eventually has him declared dead.

=== 2011–2013 ===
Todd's identical twin brother, Victor Lord, Jr. (Trevor St. John), whom he had never known, is physically altered and brainwashed to believe that he is Todd. From May 2003 to August 2011, he assumes Todd's identity. In 2003, Irene Manning, who had been presumed dead, ordered a hit on the real Todd to keep him from exposing her agency. She had Todd strapped to a chair and made him uncover every detail of his life. She originally gave Victor Todd's scar, but then had Victor's face altered with reconstructive surgery to make him look like Mitch Laurence's long lost brother, Flynn Walker Laurence.

Irene sent Victor away in Todd's place, so that he could get his share of the inheritance as Victor Lord, Sr.'s heir, and unknowingly help the agency. She kept the real Todd locked up, instead of following through with the original plan to kill him. She eventually admits to these facts after Todd escapes and returns home. Todd struggles with losing eight years of his life and blames Victor for stealing his children, including the daughter he had with Téa, Danielle (Dani). He plans to kill Victor and is the top suspect when Victor is gunned down. He claims his innocence and convinces Starr to help him escape jail to keep Irene from killing the family for Victor's fortune. Although Irene wounds him, Todd kills her. Téa's brother, Tomás (Ted King), takes credit for allowing a wounded Todd to escape. Todd begins having vivid memories of killing Victor. Before Tomás is sentenced, Todd confesses to Irene's murder; Téa gets the charges reduced to self-defense. Todd locates the gun used to kill Victor and uses it to frame Tomás as revenge for initially bringing him to Irene. Todd and a rogue CIA agent force Tomás into a false confession. Todd faces difficulty bonding with Jack, who only accepts Victor as his father, but he continues to bond with Starr and assists her with various issues. He also helps Cole Thornhart fake his death so he can live with Starr and their daughter, Hope, in California. Todd is later arrested for Victor's murder.

In 2012, Todd jumps bail and arrives in Port Charles, New York, upon learning that Starr has been involved in a car accident that resulted in the deaths of Cole and Hope. Todd thinks local mobster, Sonny Corinthos (Maurice Benard), is responsible for the deaths and seeks revenge. The charges against him for Victor's murder are dropped, due to a claim of posttraumatic stress disorder (PTSD) following his years in captivity, but Starr faces attempted murder charges for trying to kill Sonny. A pregnant Téa, who has been sought out by Blair to represent Starr, gets the charges dropped. In June, Todd is with Téa during an intense rainstorm when she goes into labor and gives birth to an unresponsive baby boy. At the same time, Sam Morgan (Kelly Monaco) is also giving birth to a baby boy in a motel room. After Todd, searching for help, comes upon Heather Webber (Robin Mattson) in a shack, and she tells Todd that Téa's baby has died, he comes across Sam's son. An elated Téa sees the child and believes he is hers. Todd allows Téa to believe the child is hers after Heather talks him out of telling Téa the truth. Todd forms a close relationship with Carly Corinthos (Laura Wright), Sonny's former wife, in the wake of yet another rejection from Blair, who is set to marry Tomás. Todd's role in the baby switch is eventually revealed, but to make amends for almost killing her son, Steven, Heather lies to the judge and prosecutors about Todd's role in switching the babies. He is then released.

In 2013, Todd returns to Llanview to check on Dani, who had phoned him several times previously. He witnesses Dani collapse from a drug overdose due to her abuse of oxycodone. While she is recovering at the hospital, Victor, who is alive, arrives. A surprised Téa, Dani, and Jack welcome Victor back while Todd tries to bond with his children. Todd remains concerned about Jack and Dani, attempting to buy their affections with money and deciding the best way to win them over is to call a truce with Victor. He also tries to win back Blair's affections. He eventually admits he pretended to get along with Victor to lure him into a false sense of security. Victor admits that he poisoned Todd's scotch with arsenic and then tried to strangle him. Jack takes Todd to the hospital, where he recovers, but is frustrated when his family continues to defend Victor. Victor realizes he must leave town and says goodbye to his family.

Todd shows Blair a threatening note he received with the names of all his loved ones on it. The mysterious Tattoo Organization, which held Victor, demands that Todd find and kill Victor. Todd, Blair, and Téa devise a scheme to fool the organization into believing Victor is dead. Feeling secure that their scheme has worked, they plan for the future. Todd receives another note from the Tattoo Organization, this time telling him that he failed them and that Victor has been recaptured. Todd is told that he must leave Llanview and go to the address given on the note. Todd says goodbye to Viki and his children, but does not tell them the real reason he is leaving is to protect their family. Before Todd leaves, he and Blair make love one last time, and it is revealed that they have remarried.

== See also ==
- Todd Manning and Marty Saybrooke rape storylines
- Depiction of rape in One Life to Live
- Todd Manning and Blair Cramer
- Todd Manning and Téa Delgado

== Works cited ==
- Hayward, Jennifer (1997). Consuming Pleasures: Active Audiences and Serial Fictions from Dickens to Soap Opera. Lexington, Kentucky: The University Press of Kentucky. ISBN 0-8131-2025-X
