= Todd Manning and Marty Saybrooke rape storylines =

Roger Howarth (top center) and Susan Haskell (bottom center) as characters in the 1993 rape storyline.

The Todd Manning and Marty Saybrooke rape storylines are storylines from the ABC daytime drama One Life to Live consisting of rape, revenge, redemption and love. Created by writers Michael Malone and Ron Carlivati, the stories depict characters Todd (originally Roger Howarth, later Trevor St. John) and Marty (Susan Haskell) struggling to overcome his actions of rape and destruction. On August 17, 2011, the series revealed St. John's character as Todd's identical twin brother, Victor Lord, Jr., conditioned to believe he was Todd and to thereby assume Todd's identity, which negated Todd's "second rape" of Marty.

The original rape occurs in 1993, when Todd rapes Marty as part of a revenge scheme. In 2008, he is considered to have raped her again after the two engage in sex while she is amnesiac. The storylines resulted in significant controversy, and were subsequently heavily debated among viewers, cited in mainstream press, and studied within various academic works. The 1993 gang rape was created by Malone and is considered one of soap opera's classic, "most remembered and impactful" storylines, and Carlivati's 2008 "re-rape" story is credited with having been "worth the tense moments" despite being "the riskiest [soap opera] storyline in recent memory".

== Writing and impact ==
=== 1993–1994: "Gold standard" ===
From left to right: Characters Todd, Kevin, Powell and Zach.

The storyline was inspired by recent news stories about an increase in gang rapes on college campuses across the country, and was described by TV Guide's Michael Logan as one that "may be the most daring plot ever attempted on soaps". To ensure accuracy, social workers were hired to review scripts.

Head writer Malone scripted Todd as a serial rapist, and the character was intended to be short-lived. This changed when Howarth's portrayal of the character inspired notable fan reaction and prompted the creators to layer Todd's personality and showcase him regularly within the series. Malone decided to write a redemption storyline for Todd, and have him continually seek forgiveness from Marty.

The storyline takes place at the Kappa Alpha Delta fraternity. Marty is the 18-year-old party girl, while Todd is the 20-year-old quintessential jock. She is his tutor, but he does not pass one of his exams. Because of this, he is kicked off the football team and will not graduate on time. Additionally, his abusive father will be outraged. Angered by this outcome, Todd initially decides to humiliate Marty at a party (the Spring Fling). She is the one to humiliate him, however, and even notes his inability to satisfy her in bed. As revenge, Todd has his fraternity brothers Powell Lord (the III) and Zach Rosen help him rape her after she is left alone upstairs in Kevin's room.

...Todd, Zach and Powell [go] upstairs to find Marty passed out on Kevin’s bed. When Marty wakes up and sees the three of them, she instantly gets wary. As she gets up off the bed, Todd grabs her and tosses her around in the circle that the three have created, taunting her. Marty begs to be let out of the room, but they refuse. Powell is nervous and doesn’t want to hurt her, but Todd and Zach have no qualms about what they are going to do. Todd throws Marty on the bed as Zach orders Powell to lock the door. Todd brutally rapes Marty and when he finishes, tells Zach that it is his turn. Zach stuffs a sweatband in her mouth to keep her from screaming. Todd congratulates Zach and then the two urge Powell on. When the assault on Marty ends, the three go downstairs. Zach and Todd act like nothing happened while Powell's conscience is eating him up. Soon Marty comes downstairs and as she leaves the party, Todd blows her a kiss.

— Soapoperasource.com on the 1993 rape storyline

Analyst Jennifer Hayward described this aspect of the writing as not being about sex, women, or Marty herself, but rather about what takes place between men and women in the aftermath of rape. The story draws out powerful archetypes, such as the fight between good and evil, reminiscent of 19th-century melodrama, where critique would be given to "power relations, especially the oppression of the poor by the rich and of women by men". Malone had Powell initially resist raping Marty, harbor deep guilt for his part in the rape, and act as a conscience that Todd ignores. Analyst Mary Buhl Dutta reasoned the storyline invokes "rape myths" cataloged by scholar Martha R. Burt, such as "only bad girls get raped," "women ask for it," and "women 'cry rape' only when they've been jilted or have something to cover up". Burt said such myths "deny or reduce perceived injury, or ... blame the victims for their own victimization". Author Gerry Waggett said the "close-ups of the rapists' faces during the assault, distorted to capture Marty's scared and drunken perspective, rank among the show's most graphic images" and that "Marty's subsequent quest to bring her rapists to justice dominated throughout the summer".

Howarth considered Todd's rationale for raping Marty as a complex matter. "Todd was in love with Marty," he said. Though Todd and Marty initially have a one-night stand, she rejects his later romantic advances; this begins to upset Todd and eventually starts to fester. Todd failing an exam only adds to his frustration because everything "had always come so easy to him". Rather than admitting that he himself is the reason for failing his exam, he blames Marty; it has to be his tutor's fault. Todd subsequently tries to cast all of his problems off on Marty.

Marty initially thinks Kevin raped her as well. When the rape trial begins, she realizes that Kevin did not rape her and recants her testimony so that Kevin is exonerated. Malone chose the rape trial to reveal Todd as a serial rapist; the character had also raped a woman named Carol Swift, and likely young women before her. When Todd is on the witness stand, "he goes as far as forgiving Marty for claiming that what happened the night of the Spring Fling was rape". The trial ends in a mistrial when Nora Gannon (Hillary B. Smith), Todd's lawyer, realizes that the three alleged perpetrators did rape her.

"Marty's mistaken accusation naming Kevin Buchanan (then Kirk Geiger) as one of her assailants turned the gang rape and court case into an umbrella storyline that encompassed the entire cast."

— Soap opera analyst and author Gerry Waggett

To Malone and ABC executives' surprise, Todd became an "immensely popular" character during the storyline. As his popularity grew, and as a solution not to have to kill off what had become a perceived monster, Malone and executive producer Susan Bedsow Horgan chose a controversial option — the decision to complicate Todd by ensuring that he was not a one-dimensional rapist. Malone and Horgan started Todd's transition into a more well-rounded character with their second transition of Powell. They had Powell attempt suicide and soon confess to raping Marty. He is publicly forgiven by Marty herself, which enrages Todd when he and fellow rapist Zach receive eight-year sentences behind prison compared to Powell's three months of jail time. Todd makes a vow that he will be out of prison in three months as well. To carry out this vow, Todd was written to escape by "drugging himself, waking from a coma to leap from a speeding ambulance, and then reviving himself again by stabbing a knife through his hand while rolling his eyes heavenward" and saying the pain felt good. The scary determination of the character had become characteristic of him by then, and he often seemed superhuman. Within the story, he wants revenge on the person he feels is most responsible for his prison time, Nora. With his escape from prison, he sets out to attack the currently blind Nora. Todd stalks and torments her, but she is spared from his attack by her then-husband Bo Buchanan (Robert S. Woods) showing up before Todd can finish the assault and rape her.

Todd eventually tries to rape Marty again but fails; his attack is thwarted by Marty's close friend (Luna Moody). The writers had the scuffle between the two leave Todd with a scar gracing the right side of his face, which served to signify his past misdeeds. They soon started to redeem him, first with the introduction of character Rebecca Lewis. His "true redemption" begins with his rescue of Marty and two children from a car wreck, and ends with the discovery that he is the rightful heir to a fortune left by his deceased biological father.

Todd's spiritual journey was crafted as a man who wanted forgiveness for his past misdeeds. In the story, he reasons that he does not deserve forgiveness; this contributes to him embracing his worst qualities. Malone was intrigued by telling this type of character aspect, and felt that it worked better due to Howarth being an actor who would not let Todd acquire redemption easily. Malone felt the most important part of Todd's redemption was to have him re-confront Marty in order to better deal with the fact that he initiated a gang rape on her. Despite the character's eagerness to be thought of as a decent human being, the writers felt that these good deeds should never make Todd feel any less horrible for having raped Marty.

Though Todd's redemption was controversial, it was also largely accepted. In his book Behold the Man, Edisol Dotson suggests acceptance of Todd's redemption as significantly being due to the character's physical attractiveness. "Viewers found it in their hearts to forgive Todd his acts of rape and murder. Why? Fans of One Life to Live consider Todd attractive and sexy," stated Dotson. "Were Todd an ugly man, he would have never been forgiven, and female fans would not crowd the studio's backdoor shouting his name." The "good-looking rapist" theory largely contributing to the character's success has been argued by some female fans, however.

In 1995, Howarth left the role for the first time. Significantly brought on by Todd's redemption storyline, he said he had no desire to portray a redeemed Todd. In the October 24, 1995 Soap Opera Digest issue, he stated:

In the beginning, the character of Todd was successful. I'll always be proud of this story, because it was the result of a real team effort. It was one of those spectacular times when the writer, producer, director, grips, engineers and actors were all on the same wavelength. Everybody was working toward a common goal. My task, at the time, was to show the humanity of someone who was basically inhuman. Todd wasn't one-dimensional, but he was definitely a serious psychopath. Todd was a serial rapist. He raped Carol Swift. Then, he raped Marty Saybrooke, and that rape was brutal, intense, violent and realistic. There were innuendos that he had raped other women before. He stalked Nora, he stalked and tried to rape Luna. [Then-Executive Producer] Linda Gottlieb told me with reasonable certainty that [One Life to Live] would not try to redeem Todd. So, I didn't think the character would change. Then about a year ago, it became clear to me that they were taking the character on a different path — they were redeeming him. In my mind, I'd been hired to play Todd Manning, a very realistic, serious psychopath. But now, the powers-that-be wanted me to play Todd Lord. And the story of Todd Lord is not realistic — it's a fairy tale. I thought, "It would be best for the show if I were to leave." That's when I tendered my resignation.

Howarth went on to say Todd and Marty suddenly bonding did not make sense and that he could not, in good conscience, promote the story of Todd Lord, who had become a likeable character. "If the rape had been an unrealistic, soapy thing, then it wouldn't matter. But because it was so in-depth and so brutal, to show Todd and Marty having drinks together in Rodi's — to show Marty feeling safe and comfortable with Todd — is bizarre," he said. "People have come up to me and said, 'My 7-year-old loves you.' What do I say to that? I'm not going to tell them, 'Don't let your 7-year-old watch TV.' But I have to say, it's disturbing."

Entertainment Weekly reported that One Life to Live agreed to let Howarth go on the condition that he would not appear on another soap opera for 12 months. Howarth continued to leave and return to the role until his 2003 departure from the series, but ensured Todd was never fully redeemed.

Before Todd and Marty's story, soap opera writers often sided with rapists and not the rape victims. This made the Marty rape storyline unique for the decade in which it was told. Malone's story "truly resonates and engages the daytime community because the umbrella arc — which consisted of three acts: crime, justice, and atonement — wasn’t mined from a place of desperation, nor a desire for ratings". Malone "penned a character-rich story" rooted in "telling an honest and emotional study of a woman’s right to sexual freedom juxtaposed with a patriarchy destined to destroy it. And that’s why it worked".

The rape storyline became regarded as "the gold standard of rape stories". It inspired feminist studies, and won Daytime Emmy Awards, including actor, actress and writer Emmys, in 1994; Howarth won for Outstanding Younger Actor. In 1995, he was nominated for an Emmy as Outstanding Supporting Actor in a Drama Series, won the Soap Opera Digest Award for Outstanding Younger Lead Actor, and the Soap Opera Digest Award for Outstanding Villain in 1998. Additionally, he won several soap opera awards in the years following as Todd. His popularity led viewers to demand his stay on the show, and his portrayal of the character is credited with making Todd a legend and icon within the soap opera medium.

=== 2008–2009: "Re-rape" ===
Haskell as amnesiac Marty, with St. John as "Todd" physically revised in the 2008 "re-rape" storyline.

St. John was initially brought on as Todd Manning posing as character Walker Laurence. In 2011, with Howarth's return as Todd, the writers decided to rewrite this and instead have St. John's character revealed as Todd's identical twin brother, Victor Lord, Jr., conditioned to believe he was Todd and to thereby assume Todd's identity. This made it so that Todd never raped Marty for a second time.

The idea for the "re-rape" storyline materialized in 2007, when head writer Carlivati decided to revisit the rape storyline, and create a spin-off story from that. In December of that year, Marty is shown to be thrown from a van during a crash. The van explodes, and she is presumed dead. In June 2008, St. John's character, who believes himself to be Todd, discovers her alive; she is afflicted with amnesia and crippled since the crash. He subsequently starts to nurse her back to health. This interaction unnerved the audience, as they witnessed "Todd" lying to Marty about her identity and her importance to the people she loves, the two bonding, and Marty having a positive flashback of her recent interaction with him. Viewers speculated the writers would romantically pair the characters. Since Howarth had been against the idea of romantically pairing Todd and Marty when he was in the role and had sensed attempts to follow through with the notion, viewers became conflicted about whether or not they believed the writers would now follow through with the storyline.

St. John felt the need to apologize following comments he made at an August 2008 Fan Club Luncheon. When asked about the controversial storyline, he replied, "I'm all for gang rape." He issued the following apology to SOAPnet.com: "I regret the way I responded to the question about the upcoming Todd and Marty storyline. It was meant in jest and I should know better than to ever try and make a joke about such a serious subject. I intended no disre[s]pect and apologize to anyone I offended."

In response to viewer concern about the direction the writers seemed to be taking Todd and Marty's bond, Carlivati assured Soap Opera Digest that he would have never written this under different circumstances. "We're not talking about Marty with all her memories. She would never get close to Todd in any way," he said. "This is about a Marty who doesn't remember anything about him, and he starts to feel close to this new person and starts to feel this gratitude for the fact that she doesn't remember this horrible thing he did." Carlivati added, "It is like this new chapter and this new arc. I don't think I would ever attempt to tell this relationship the way we're telling it if she knew who she was." He said, "I think that's a much different scenario. If we had Marty just come back to town and we started to build a relationship between the two of them...I can't imagine."

Todd and Marty's relationship became based on a psychiatrist/patient dynamic and not something physical. When asked if romance could be a possibility, Carlivati stated, "I'd like to watch it unfold a beat at a time, a day at a time, a week at a time and not have the audience jump to, 'Are they going to kiss? Are they going to fall in love? Are they going to sleep together?' The goal is more to take these two characters who have an unbelievable, dark history with each other and explore where it would or could go if they didn't have that obstacle — the rape — between them." However, Carlivati said that this obstacle would always be there and that the audience would see close moments. These close moments include Todd helping Marty walk and physical contact between the two while he nurses her back to health. "I think the thing about the two of them, the characters and the actors, is you feel a chemistry when they're just talking, so I don't necessarily categorize it as romantic," stated Carlivati. "They're definitely forming a relationship and it continues to grow and build through the fall."

Regarding viewers' resistance to a romantic pairing between the two, Carlivati acknowledged, "I understand the initial impulse, but then again, I feel that action is more appropriate if we were telling a story where she had all of her memories. It's not that I don't get or understand the seriousness of putting these two characters together, but I don't think we're in any way damaging Marty's character." Carlivati stated that "this is not the same Marty and, to me, it's fascinating to watch because you're wondering if and when it is all going to come tumbling down".

The imagery of "Todd" taking care of a bedridden Marty made viewers significantly uncomfortable.

On September 5, 2008, Todd and Marty share a passionate kiss as Todd helps her walk. He initiates the intimate contact, and viewers, as well as critics, argued that, given his sexual intimacy issues, it was out of character for him to be as sexually bold towards Marty; Marty being his rape victim had been the main source of his sexual hangups. On September 23, 2008, the show went further with intimacy between the two and had them almost engage in sex. Todd eventually backs away from the contact, presumably due to his conscience.

In his September 29, 2008 article, TV Guide's Nelson Branco declared the soap opera in a "state of emergency" due to its insistence on going through with a Todd and Marty romance. Critics and fans questioned whether the current head writer of the show was the same head writer who had successively given the series good storylines just a year before. In addition, the romance was speculated to be a ratings ploy, and Brian Frons, president of ABC Daytime, was speculated as having dictated which stories Carlivati wrote. Romantically pairing Todd and Marty had been contemplated and proposed by several One Life to Live writers, even though the notion was considered career suicide. Howarth and Haskell's refusal to act out the storyline is what largely kept writers from going through with the story. Haskell, however, decided to return to the series as Marty in 2008, and had seemingly reconsidered the possibility of a Todd and Marty romance due to Carlivati's insistence that this was not the same Marty. Branco stated, "Three weeks ago, Carlivati's risky and oh-so-reckless decision to turn the gold standard of rape stories — Michael Malone’s [1993] Emmy-winning gang-rape storyline — into a soap cliché culminated in a shocking, controversial and highly publicized kiss." Expressing his dismay at One Life to Live's decision to turn Todd and Marty's relationship romantic, Branco stated:

...I’m afraid, it’s too late. After witnessing Todd play tongue hockey with Marty, I felt betrayed, hurt, and disgusted as a viewer. This storyline no longer resonates nor engages me. As Emmy-winning soap scribe Tom Casiello noted recently in one of his blogs, had Marty kissed Todd, and not the other way around... oh, what am I talking about? In my eyes, it wouldn’t have made an iota of difference. Sadly, that single kiss erased 16 years of story and character motivation/back-story from my soap-viewing history. In that depressing yet shocking moment, I realized I had wasted almost two decades investing — and believing — in this epic story.

Contrasting the original Todd and Marty rape storyline, the Todd and Marty romance was criticized as lacking in sense and not having a point. It was argued that Todd would not initiate or engage in a misdeed which would not benefit him, and that he was haunted by his gang rape of Marty for years. "He would have immediately seen the win-win situation in heroically saving Marty and giving her back to her friends and family." Carlivati's Todd and Marty scenes resembled a daily therapy session, with Marty as the patient. As Marty asks about the details of her rape, Todd reluctantly recounts the gang rape moment by moment to Marty as a storm brews outside, just as it had on the night he raped her, but leaves left out the fact that he is one of the men who raped her. Todd having been raped by Margaret Cochran also does not seem to induce any awareness on Todd's part for unfairly holding Marty captive.

Marty's cleverness being downplayed during the Todd and Marty romance was also an issue. "According to the FBI, rape is the most violent thing that can happen to a person — next to murder." Despite Todd having a new face, it was stated that people who have experienced a violent attack can attest that their bodies may heal but do not forget. "When encountered with similar circumstances your body immediately goes into fight or flight mode." However, Marty spending time with Todd and hearing about the rape in his own words does not help restore her memory, aside from one subconscious flashback to her rape. In addition, Marty believes everything Todd tells her and disregards picking up a phone or Googling herself. On October 3, 2008, Marty finally looks up her rape on the Internet and sees the faces of her rapists, but Todd gets there before she can find out their names. Due to Todd's plastic surgery, Marty does not recognize that one of the rapists in the pictures is Todd. Todd is able to convince Marty to do no further research about her rape.

Questions regarding the number of female One Life to Live viewers who have been raped and what kind of message One Life to Live was sending to their tween-girl demographic, a demographic they ranked #1 in, was noted. Lynn Parrish, a RAINN (Rape, Abuse, & Incest National Network) spokesperson for America's largest anti-sexual assault organization, said that she had never heard of a rapist and his victim falling in love and that if people are to believe a medium watched primarily by women and written for women, it is "as common as the winter cold". Parrish stated that One Life to Live did not contact RAINN before telling the 2008 Todd and Marty storyline, but that ABC agreed to air a rape-themed PSA in the near future. Parish spoke of her feelings about the pairing. "There is nothing romantic about rape," she said. "Whoever writes a romance between a rapist and its victim under any circumstances clearly doesn’t understand rape nor violence — and probably shouldn’t be writing about it."

Website Soapoperasource.com stated, "Please, Ron Carlivati, stop playing around with Marty’s rape. Michael Malone wrote a brilliant story that still has repercussions today" and "[We] cannot think of a single good thing that will come out of this storyline and a PSA from RAINN doesn’t cut it. You never should have written this story. It’s disgraceful and offensive to every person who has ever been sexually assaulted."

"In any romance genre, that effort of shared redemption would ultimately lead to a romantic relationship. Whether that means Marty and Todd would fall in love when they are 98-years-old, or as you say, would happen to their children or grandchildren, that’s up to the writer... Ultimately, only love can heal, and ultimately forgive the unforgivable. Fundamentally, if you are true to the characters, they will lead the way. And you as a writer just follow. A writer needs to listen to the characters and not expose plot on them."

— Michael Malone

On October 1, 2008, creator of the original Todd and Marty rape storyline, Malone, shared his thoughts with TV Guide about the romance controversy. "On one hand, it surprises me because Ron has been a far more conventional soap writer than I was, "Malone stated. "He’s also a great lover of the form, and has worked in the form for a long time. Ron loves the conventions and traditions of the form. So, my first reaction is, I’m surprised." Malone said that the character (Marty) having amnesia "literally erases the real moral consequences and the real spiritual journey Marty has embarked on. It’s like telling Othello he’s White and Desdemona doesn’t really die. Presumably, Marty will gain her memory, and what will happen? She will be horrified". Malone agreed that Todd had now "raped Marty in the worst possible way" but that this type of story [wasn't] coming out of nowhere". "In this genre, General Hospital's Luke and Laura have a long history. This kind of story is profoundly founded on hope, forgiveness and redemption," he said. "That’s why it goes to its most radical narrative position. That someone can forgive this ultimate crime is redemptive both for the person forgiven, and the forgiver." Malone said he had faith in Carlivati's storytelling but that the story would have been different and possibly not romantic if he himself had been writing it. "Anyone can tell a story, and one of the reasons people mock soaps is because you can only read plot," he said. "Writing a story is about the depths of the character and the relationships of the character, and the beauty in which the story is told."

On November 6, 2008, the writers followed through with their plan to have Todd engage in sex with Marty. As part of their agreement with RAINN, ABC aired a rape-themed PSA after the sex scene. Viewers and critics were outraged by the show's decision to allow the sex scene, and called the scene the "second rape of Marty" and Marty's "re-rape/rapemance". Not long after the scene, Marty discovers Todd as her rapist. Characters within the series, including Marty herself, interchangeably refer to the incident as rape and as "having had sex". Despite Todd and Marty's dark history, fans of the couple emerged; critics cited this as an irresponsible result of the storyline and the majority of these fans as young teenagers. They called the storyline reprehensible. Ed Martin of The Jack Myers Report said he had to agree with fans complaining about the storyline. "This tale, though well told, has been sickening given the history of these characters," said Martin. "I don’t believe that sex between two adults can be mutually consenting when one of the people involved has no idea what’s really going on, and especially when one of the two is a depraved brute who previously attacked the other." He added, "The writers had already established the inner conflict Todd was experiencing in the moments before he had sex with Marty. (He was even having flashbacks to the gang rape)." Martin argued, "Rather than take her to bed, he should have broken down, confessed everything to her and taken her rage. There would have been no question at that time that Todd had indeed changed."

In December 2008, Todd is officially charged with several crimes, including rape. The rape charges, as well as others, are eventually dropped when character Téa Delgado is allowed to question Marty at the hearing and subsequently "proves" the sex to have been consensual, regardless of Marty's mental state. However, on February 5, 2009, the series showcases Todd's admittance that the sex was indeed rape; the confession is made to Marty and others as Todd concurs Marty would have never been sexually intimate with him if not for her mental disability and his manipulation of her, and that he now genuinely considers the act to have been rape.

Though the romance received criticism, others spoke positively about the storyline, including one of the show's cast members. Kristen Alderson, who portrays Starr Manning, Todd's daughter on the series, remarked, "I loved the couple switch, how Marty was with Todd, and Blair was with John." She said, "I thought that they were all sweet couples, and I think they actually went well together — even though Todd and Marty’s was more twisted! But it was interesting, and it was a breath of fresh air for all the characters."

St. John said that he decided not to make the determination of whether Todd was in love with Marty or not. "I decided to leave it to the audience. Maybe Todd loves her in certain moments. Maybe in other moments, Todd just says he does. I played it like a high school crush," he said. "I thought it would be more fascinating if Todd was walking around as a contradiction in terms of his feelings for Marty. Sometimes it was put-on, and other times, it was Todd thinking." He said that the relationship was always "fluctuating and evolving".

Branco, who had severely criticized the storyline, stated that the payoff was worth the tense moments. "However obscene or depraved the riskiest storyline in recent memory was," he said, "the fallout has been shockingly riveting — thanks to the fact that head writer Ron Carlivati is playing all the psychological beats of Todd’s self-serving and criminal actions." In addition, Branco gave credit to St. John. "Nominated for a 2009 Soap Opera Spirit Award as outstanding lead actor, St. John inarguably faced the most challenging assignment of any actor in 2008 — in any genre," said Branco. "And yet, somehow, St. John made it work. In a lesser actor’s hands, the storyline most certainly would have resulted in career suicide for all involved."

== See also ==
- Depiction of rape in One Life to Live
- Todd Manning and Blair Cramer
- Todd Manning and Téa Delgado
