= Depiction of rape in One Life to Live =

The American daytime drama, One Life to Live (often abbreviated as OLTL), which debuted on the ABC television network in 1968, was one of the first soap operas to address social issues, including rape, a topic that had been addressed by the genre of soap opera long before it became a topic in the broader culture. In 1993, OLTL began to feature a storyline in which three college students, led by Todd Manning (Roger Howarth), gang raped fellow student, Marty Saybrooke (Susan Haskell). The crime was presented to the audience differently than it had been in the past, in other soap operas. The storyline, including the rape and its three-year-long consequences, was called "the most daring plot ever attempted on soaps", was regarded as "the gold standard of rape stories", and inspired feminist studies.

The character of Todd Manning was intended to be short-lived, but this changed when Howarth's portrayal inspired notable fan reaction. OLTL's head writer, Michael Malone, decided to write a redemption storyline for Todd, something Howarth was opposed to, which eventually led to him leaving the show in 2003. The role was recast by Trevor St. John, but Howarth returned as Todd in 2011. The cast and writing team involved in the storyline won several awards, and Howarth became the male lead and most popular actor on OLTL.

Scholars have noted the storyline's similarity to 19th-century melodrama and both supported and went against rape myths. It conforms to many of the same conventions of how rape has been presented in both soap operas and in literature and films, including how the rapists' trial, which dominated the show throughout the summer of 1993. Todd's lawyer, Nora Gannon (Hillary B. Smith), discovered that the defendants were guilty of the crime, and the trial ultimately ended in a mistrial. The storyline used many archetypes commonly used in other types of literature. It was also called "Dickensonian" and Todd was compared to Mary Shelley's Frankenstein. The writers moved to redeem Todd in order to keep him and his portrayer as a part of the show, using "a whole arsenal of symbolic weaponry," something that had never happened in soap operas before.

== Background and history ==
The American daytime drama, One Life to Live (often abbreviated as OLTL), which debuted on the ABC television network in 1968, was one of the first soap operas to address social issues, including rape. Rape has been a long-standing subject of soap operas; as critic Mary Buhl Dutta put it, rape was "a part of the discourse of soap opera long before its acceptance into that of the larger society". Dutta goes on to state that despite its feminist form, soap opera has paid lip service to the feminist stance about rape and has popularized the rape myths of patriarchal culture. Dutta states that the rape storyline in OLTL invokes many rape myths in American society that downplay the harm experienced by the victims of rape and blame them for their own victimization. The rape storyline, which began in 1993, was inspired by recent news stories about an increase in gang rapes on college campuses across the country. Michael Logan, a columnist with TV Guide, stated that it "may be the most daring plot ever attempted on soaps".

"So it is here, I contend, that daytime television realizes its social and political potential, as it presents the actual process of reporting a rape from the victim's perspective in an in-depth and emotionally powerful manner"

— Dianne L. Brooks

To ensure accuracy and insert realism with the conventional dramatic requirements of soap opera, social workers were hired to review scripts, and the writers researched rape and interviewed rape counselors. Todd Manning (played by Roger Howarth), a defensive back for Llanview, Pennsylvania University's football team, has a one-night stand with fellow student Marty Saybrooke (Susan Haskell). After she tutors him for a calculus exam and he fails it, which results in his suspension from the football team, he blames her. In March 1993, Todd and his fraternity brothers, Zach Rosen and Powell Lord, rape Marty in the dorm room of Kevin Buchanan during a party. Writer Dianne L. Brooks states that the presentation of the rape was done differently than how other soaps had previously presented rape. For example, it was not dramatized in "the usual voyeuristic perspective", but from the perspective of the victim and was constructed to disturb the viewers. Brooks also states that the "careful construction" of the rape scenes "signals another level of adaptation of the rape narrative to the exigencies of rape discourse in the larger world". Brooks also states that one of the most educationally valuable aspects of the storyline was how it depicted Marty's post-rape trauma and hospital examination, and the way in which it opened up further discourse about rape. Head writer Michael Malone scripted Todd as a serial rapist, and the character was intended to be short-lived. However, this changed when Howarth's portrayal of the character inspired notable fan reaction and prompted the creators to layer Todd's personality and showcase him regularly within the series. Malone decided to write a redemption storyline for Todd, having him seek forgiveness from Marty.

The storyline, including the rape and its three-year-long consequences, became regarded as "the gold standard of rape stories" and inspired feminist studies. Todd and his friends are charged with the crime, and a trial takes place, but ends in a mistrial when Nora Gannon (Hillary B. Smith), Todd's lawyer, discovers that the alleged perpetrators raped Marty. According to Brooks, in her discussion of how law is treated in soap opera, the show's writing team relied upon the expertise of one of their law school-educated writers to write most of the trial scenes, having Nora explain rape shield laws, which prevent lawyers from asking victims about their previous sexual relationships, to the jury. Brooks also discusses the common plot complication of a female lawyer defending male defendants, stating that it became one of the most important focal points of the trial storyline. One of the show's writers, Christopher Whitesell, expressed discomfort with Nora's representation of the rapists, but relied on the skill of her portrayer, Hillary B. Smith, to explore it differently on the show. Nora slowly discovered her clients' guilt during the trial, and not afterwards, as is often the convention in popular television and films, when it would be too late. She faces the dilemma of determining how to ensure they would be found guilty without compromising her professional ethics and responsibilities, and it ends in a mistrial.

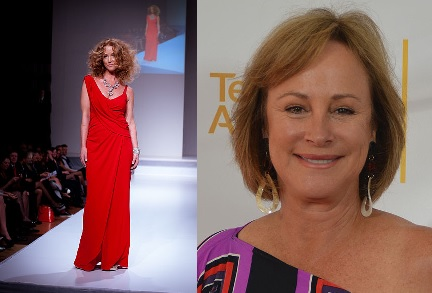
Susan Haskell (Marty) and Hillary B. Smith (Nora), who, along with Howarth, won acting Emmys in 1994 for their roles in the gang rape storyline.

In 1994, OLTL was awarded several Daytime Emmys in writing and acting for all the principals involved in the gang rape storyline. Michael Malone and Josh Griffith's team won an Emmy for writing, Susan Haskell won an Emmy for Outstanding Supporting Actress in a Drama Series, and Hillary B. Smith was awarded the Daytime Emmy Award for Outstanding Lead Actress in a Drama Series. Roger Howarth won the Daytime Emmy Award for Outstanding Younger Actor in a Drama Series. In 1995, Howarth was nominated for Outstanding Supporting Actor in a Drama Series, and Soap Opera Digest (SOD) named him Outstanding Leading Actor. SOD also named him Outstanding Villain in 1998. Howarth was a "fan favorite, and one of the best actors in soaps", and Howarth's portrayal of him has been called "iconic". The rape storyline propelled Todd "onto the list of OLTL's most despicable villains", and he became the show's "centerpiece villain". Soap opera writer Gerry Waggett said that due to the storyline and Howarth's talent, Todd eventually became the show's male lead. Todd has been called "one of the greatest characters of all-time", and TV Guide referred to Todd as a breakout character. The Hollywood Reporter stated that even though Todd was a convicted rapist, he was the most popular character, and Howarth was the most popular actor, on OLTL.

=== Other controversies ===
In 2002, as part of ABC's push to sell merchandise from its soap operas, the network began selling a doll in Todd's likeness on its website, but was thwarted by a backlash. Modeled after animated versions that represented the fantasies that Starr, Todd's daughter, had about her family, the doll sold for $19.95. According to the description on the site, it was "an all-cloth doll with brown felt hair and blue eyes. He is 20 inches standing. He wears a blue shirt and black pants". The controversy began when the industry newsletter, "The Jack Myers Report," harshly criticized ABC for selling the doll, and other news outlets reported the snafu. Bob Tedeschi of The New York Times stated, "In the charge toward e-commerce revenues, ABC learned a useful lesson last week: Don't try to sell cuddly rag dolls depicting homicidal rapists". Even though several years had passed since the gang rape and Todd had "since settled down", and had become a more sympathetic character, rape victim advocate groups thought that selling the doll glorified sexual assault, so ABC removed the doll from its online store. Pictures of the doll were pulled from the Internet, and the doll was blocked from being available on eBay or any other online store. Angela Shapiro, president of ABC, said, "I was insensitive and take total responsibility for it. I should have been sensitive to the history of the character and I wasn't". A doll of Starr remained in ABC stores.

According to Nelson Branco of TV Guide, OLTL aired "some of the most explosive and ugliest scenes ever broadcast on daytime" television in March 2008, when Todd, at that time played by Trevor St. John, who was recast as Todd in 2011, beat up teenager Cole Thornhart (his daughter's boyfriend and Marty's son), and slapped Starr and Cole's friends Markko Rivera and Langston Wilde. Todd barges in on Starr and Cole in bed together for the first time, jumping to the conclusion that Cole had raped her, "and [beats] the son of his rape victim relentlessly". In Branco's opinion, head writer Ron Carlivati wanted to use the storyline to return Todd to his dark roots by showing him as a monster again, stating, "Carlivati chose to do something unique, bold and risky with one of his marquee characters", demonstrating Todd's damaged personality and calling into question his mental stability. Carlivati said that Todd was convinced that Starr's alleged rape was karmic payback, even when Starr insisted that she had not been raped. Branco postulated that Todd's conclusion and strong reaction to seeing the two in bed together was Todd's inability to separate sex from violence, stating, "Todd, in that instance, became unhinged, paranoid, and out-of-control". Todd was in denial and even almost hit Starr twice when she challenged his beliefs. The scenes were praised as "riveting". Soap columnist, Marlena De Lacroix, a self-described "Todd hater" who felt that the character was psychotic, expressed hope that it was "the beginning of a storyline that will delve into Todd's mind and enlighten viewers as to the complexities of a character who is mentally ill". De Lacroix worried that although the storyline had the potential to be memorable, it could be another way to build sympathy for Todd.

=== Revictimizing Marty ===
Deciding to revisit the rape storyline, Carlivati wrote a story in which Marty is thrown from a van during a car crash in late 2007. The van explodes, and she is presumed dead. In June 2008, Todd discovers her alive and finds that she is afflicted with amnesia and has been crippled since the crash. He starts to nurse her back to health, lying to her about her identity and her importance to the people she loves, and he starts to develop romantic feelings for her. ABC promoted the storyline by airing ads that called it "The story you thought you'd never see". Carlivati defended the storyline by assuring the audience, who were concerned about and resisted the storyline, that it would not have been written if Marty had not lost her memories. He stated that he was aware of how serious it was to pair the characters romantically, but did not feel that it was damaging Marty's character. Carlivati was committed to having the storyline progress slowly and to using the actors' and characters' chemistry. Eventually, Todd and Marty have sex.

"In any romance genre, that effort of shared redemption would ultimately lead to a romantic relationship. Whether that means Marty and Todd would fall in love when they are 98-years-old, or as you say, would happen to their children or grandchildren, that's up to the writer ... Ultimately, only love can heal, and ultimately forgive the unforgivable. Fundamentally, if you are true to the characters, they will lead the way. And you as a writer just follow. A writer needs to listen to the characters and not expose plot on them."

— Michael Malone, in 2008, on OLTL pairing Todd and Marty in his absence from the series

According to soap opera writer Nelson Branco, the show's past writing teams had proposed creating a Marty and Todd love story, but it never happened, mostly because Haskell and Howarth had refused to participate. In Branco's opinion, the push toward the storyline was the reason Howarth eventually left OLTL for As the World Turns. By contrast, at a fan gathering in 2008, St. John joked about Todd and Marty bonding during the Carlivati storyline, stating, "I'm all for gang rape." He later issued an apology for the comment: "I should know better than to ever try and make a joke about such a serious subject. I intended no disrepect [sic] and apologize to anyone I offended".

De Lacroix found Carlivati's storyline "disgusting", stating that it was exploitative, misogynistic, insulting to the audience, and "the most phony, stupidly contrived story I have ever seen". She also felt that it was a severe injustice to the original storyline. Fans who were opposed to the storyline called it "the re-rape". ABC aired public service announcements (PSAs) for the National Sexual Assault Hotline at the end of the episode. Lynn Parrish, a spokesperson for Rape, Abuse & Incest National Network (RAINN), which was not consulted by the show's writers, spoke out against the "re-rape" storyline. She told Branco, "There is nothing romantic about rape", and that "whoever writes a romance between a rapist and its victim under any circumstances clearly doesn't understand rape nor violence—and probably shouldn't be writing about it".

Branco called the original rape storyline "the gold standard of rape stories," and stated that Carlivati had changed it into a soap opera cliché. Carlivati's addition to the characters' histories left him feeling betrayed, hurt, depressed, angry, insulted, and disgusted, and he said that he had wasted almost 20 years investing in and believing in the original rape storyline. At the conclusion of the "re-rape" storyline, Branco stated that the payoff was worth the tense moments. "However obscene or depraved the riskiest storyline in recent memory was," he said, "the fallout has been shockingly riveting—thanks to the fact that head writer Ron Carlivati is playing all the psychological beats of Todd's self-serving and criminal actions". Branco also gave credit to St. John. "Nominated for a 2009 Soap Opera Spirit Award as outstanding lead actor, St. John inarguably faced the most challenging assignment of any actor in 2008—in any genre," said Branco. "And yet, somehow, St. John made it work. In a lesser actor's hands, the storyline most certainly would have resulted in career suicide for all involved".

== Literary analysis ==
=== Rape and redemption ===
The rape storyline in OLTL inspired feminist studies. Although it was well-received, it was also criticized. Jennifer Hayward, in her literary analysis of the rape and its similarity to 19th-century melodrama, stated that the storyline polarized "the gap between rapists and the raped but also the figure of the rapist himself". She also stated that the writers' implication that Powell Lord, one of the characters who raped Marty, was a good person, and that peer pressure "could be an adequate (or even physiologically possible) excuse for rape". Scholar Mary Buhl Dutta, arguing that the storyline perpetuated rape myths, commented on how the series used Marty, who fulfilled the stereotype of "the bad girl" who was the rape victim. Dutta stated that Marty had falsely accused another young man of rape after the Reverend Andrew Carpenter, the young man's counselor, rebuffed her romantic advances. After she was raped, she falsely yet unintentionally accuses Kevin Buchanan, who was innocent. Marty, according to Dutta, "is a 'bad girl' because she had a one-night stand with Todd before the rape, bolstering his later claim she 'asked for it' in their second sexual encounter".

Critics have wondered why Todd is popular. Soap opera journalist Marlena De Lacroix, who acknowledged that she neither liked nor understood Todd, expressed her inability to understand his popularity among so many fans, even during his several hiatuses from the show. She asked, "Why has the show devoted years of storyline time to him and all but made a hero out of a criminal?" Hayward, who said that her own response to Todd's redemption was ambivalent, called the writers' attempt to redeem Todd controversial and stated that the role of Rebecca, the woman the writers paired Todd with during the redemption process, "seems to encourage both female and male fantasies about the power of a 'good woman' to save a man from his own violent impulses". In his book, Behold the Man, Edisol Dotson suggested that viewers accepted Todd's redemption because he was physically attractive. Dotson stated, "Were Todd an ugly man, he would have never been forgiven, and female fans would not crowd the studio's backdoor shouting his name".

Soap opera commentator Jenn Bishop said she found it difficult to explain Todd's popularity, and that if she was perplexed about her feelings regarding him, it is understandable that others would be as well. She considered Todd an abhorrent character, with "little to no redeeming qualities", whose actions spanning from immoral to criminal. She added, "I wouldn't want to know Todd, let alone be around him in real life. Nor would I want any woman to have any sort of relationship with him". She called him "an anti-anti-hero" and said that the authenticity of the rape storyline added to the character's appeal. Todd was not the only soap opera character who committed the crime of rape, but the way it was written "didn't leave a lot of room for rewrites". She cited the storyline about Luke's rape of Laura on General Hospital, which was rewritten as a seduction, and stated that the rape on OLTL left no room for alternative interpretations of the events as they were presented or explained away as "simply the behavior of a romantic rogue". Despite Bishop's ambivalence towards the character, she recognized that due to how the writers had Todd pay for his crimes, he was a "dynamic, unpredictable, multi-faceted character with many traits that conflict with one another," adding that Todd became "one messed up guy", who was likable and intriguing to the viewers.

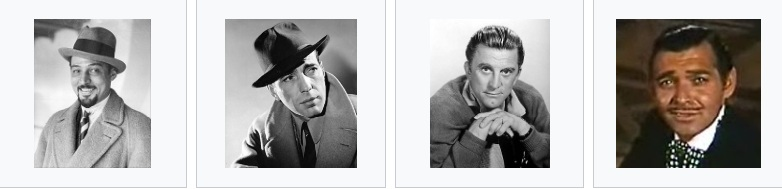
Rudolph Valentino, Humphrey Bogart, Kirk Douglas, and Clark Gable, who all started out playing irredeemable villains like Todd

According to Hayward, the writing team involved in Todd's redemption story arc was composed of more men than was typically the case because, for most of the history of soap operas, writers have been predominantly women. In a June 1994 interview with TV Guide, in an article about the trend during the early 1990s of redeemed rapists on soap operas, Malone commented that "[t]he bond between the woman and the violator is a great historical tradition in fiction and films," and said that Rudolph Valentino, Humphrey Bogart, Kirk Douglas, and Clark Gable "all began as totally irredeemable villains". Although he did not think that most women want to be raped or are drawn to violence, he said that viewers "are responding to the intensity of passion and an actor who lets you inside the torment. Some [women] believe they can be swept up in that passion and still turn it good. They think, 'With me, he'd be different'". The author of the article, Michael Logan, supported Malone's statements and commented, "Let's call a spade a spade. There is a large contingent of American female soap viewers who find something very attractive about rapists". Hayward reported that many female viewers were furious that Logan had described them this way, and stated that their attraction to Todd was due to the skill of the actor portraying him.

At the height of Todd's popularity, which was called "Todd-mania" and "the Todd Manning phenomenon", Howarth was disturbed that so many women were attracted to Todd and that the show's writers had begun to redeem the character. In a September 1995 interview with The Hollywood Reporter, the publication stated that Howarth was troubled that "his villainous character became such a fan favorite". Howarth gave credit to the show's writers for Todd's popularity, saying that the rapists' trial was well constructed, but that he opposed their attempts to redeem Todd. Howarth said he had no desire to portray a redeemed Todd and that the show would be better off finding "a Todd who won't object to the material". Howarth also stated that Todd and Marty suddenly bonding, even if reluctantly, did not make sense, and that he could not, in good conscience, support Todd's redemption. For example, he found showing Todd and Marty having drinks with each other "bizarre" in light of his rape of her, which he called "so in-depth and so brutal". Entertainment Weekly reported that OLTL agreed to let Howarth go on the condition that he would not appear on another soap opera for twelve months. Indy Week said that although "Todd was partially redeemed into a self-destructive antihero who remained popular until the show's end", his portrayer and many critics were wary of his development as a romantic lead.

=== Archetypes and rape ===
Dianne L. Brooks states that the rape storyline conforms to many of the same conventions of how rape has been presented in soap operas. She states that the characteristics of and relationship between Marty and Todd quickly become central to the storyline. Soaps have historically used rape to transform, or redeem, the rape victim into a more sympathetic character. According to Brooks, however, Marty "represents the ideal narrative victim because of her morally ambiguous past and her evolution into a more sympathetic character". The rape does not transform Marty because the writers avoided using it in that way, which Brooks calls a "degrading plot strategy" and praises the show's writers for presenting their plot in a more complex way. The writers use the rape to integrate Marty into the show, as the community of Llanview pulls together to support her as she rejects her status as a victim.

Brooks finds the rape storyline on OLTL "uniquely interesting" because it "fully embodies the absolute complexity of the soap opera genre, a complexity that is often dismissed as confused, unsatisfying and insulting". In some ways, the show upholds some of the genre's assumptions about rape, but it also presumes that the assumptions are wrong by using the trope of the false accusation. Marty mistakenly identifies Kevin Buchanan as one of her assailants, which lengthens the plot, tells another side of the story, and generates frustration with viewers, who, since they occupy the space of the victim in the narrative, know that Marty is both a victim and mistaken about Kevin. Brooks states that the show's viewers, whom she calls "skilled soap readers", know that Marty will eventually be vindicated because the writers knew that "the fans would not stand for anything else", and because her assailants were well-educated, upper-class men, "counter to the stereotypical prime-time villains, who are normally associated with sex crimes, both historically and in contemporary society".

As Todd's portrayer, Roger Howarth said writers use recognizable archetypes when creating soap opera characters. Writer Jennifer Hayward felt the same, stating that, like 19th-century melodrama and serials, soap operas draw on powerful archetypes. According to Hayward, the OLTL writers "had a terrific time camping up Todd as the embodiment of evil". She said that the writers treated rape like most soap operas had done in the past, by using archetypes such as the fight between good and evil and the contrast between the weak and strong. Author Gerry Waggett said, "The close-ups of the rapists' faces during the assault, distorted to capture Marty's scared and drunken perspective, rank among the show's most graphic images". An attempt was made to dramatize the rape and present it differently from the typical voyeuristic perspective, and the scenes were designed to disturb the audience. Waggett added, "Marty's subsequent quest to bring her rapists to justice dominated the show" throughout the summer of 1993. Brooks views the trial as educational, as well as an exploration, using both melodrama and realism, of how the legal system often fails to vindicate rape victims.

Up to this point, soap operas used rape and its related archetypes to, like their 19th-century melodrama counterparts, "critique power relationships, especially the oppression of the poor by the rich and of women by men". Hayward believes that the storyline was initially flawed because two of the rapists, Todd and Zach, were demonized, which oversimplified rape and "failed to capture the complex power relations underlying ... violence towards women". The perpetrators were "simply evil or out of control", so they and the mindsets they represented could be rejected. The three characters represented three archetypes of the rapist: "the evil instigator" (Todd); "the good resister" (Powell), and "the mediator between these polarized figures" (Zach), but also represented a departure from how rape was treated in soap opera. Brooks called the rapists "a complicated alternative to the standard soap opera rapist" because they had a different relationship with their victim than in previous rape narratives and because they were multiple. Todd, whom Brooks called the "evil 'other'", was the leader and most villainous of the group and had a previous physical relationship with Marty. Hayward said, "What becomes especially clear is that for these characters the act of rape is not about sex, about women, or even about Marty. It is about what takes place ... between men".

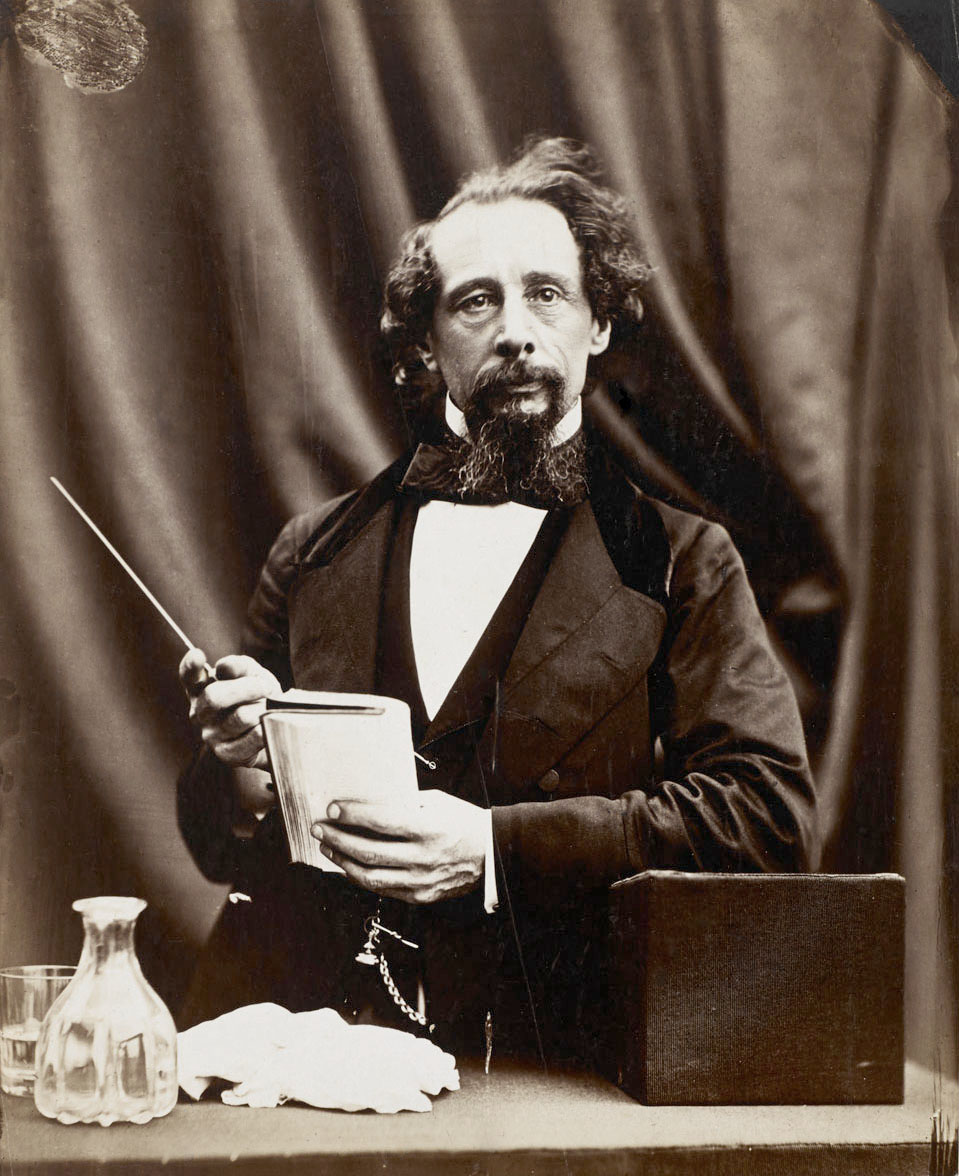
Charles Dickens (1858). The writers were influenced by Dickens' writings and characters, as well as by other 19th-century literature

Like serials throughout history, soap operas use the unstable identity as a literary device, as evidenced by the genre's use of mistaken identities, evil twins, and characters that suffer from dissociative identity disorder and return from the dead. Identity is used in the rape storyline as well. Before the rape, Todd was crude yet still human, but afterwards, he became a dehumanized embodiment of rage, demonstrated by Todd's bizarre and dangerous behavior after his conviction. Powell Lord, whose name is full of the same kind of symbolism Charles Dickens used when choosing his characters' names, and who initially urges his friends to let Marty go, yet ultimately gives in to peer pressure, is a "relative 'good'" character as compared to Todd's "'absolute evil' identity". In Hayward's opinion, "The show also departs from the rape paradigm not only by insisting on the essential 'goodness' of Powell Lord ... but even more startlingly by redeeming the evil Todd". Initially, "the increasingly guilt-ridden" Powell is the only rapist who has a conscience. He attempts to convince Todd and Zach to confess their crime, and comes close to confessing to his lawyer. Hayward calls Powell, like Todd, "redeemed", but, unlike Todd, was so guilt-ridden that he attempted suicide, was forgiven by Marty, and received a much lighter jail sentence than Zach or Todd.

=== Redeeming Todd ===
Initially, Todd, as described by Hayward, was written as "unequivocally bad: sullen, remorseless, charmless". As Todd's popularity grew with the audience, mostly due to Howarth's abilities to portray Todd as more than a one-dimensional rapist, Malone and executive producer, Susan Bedsow Horgan, chose the controversial option of redeeming Todd rather than killing him off or permanently sending him to prison, which is what soap operas had usually done with irredeemable rapists in the past. The writers began to redeem Todd, or change him so that he could be incorporated into the show, in the spring of 1994, a year after the rape. Hayward states that it required "a whole arsenal of symbolic weaponry," something that had never happened in soap operas before. Malone was intrigued by crafting the story in this way and saw it as the spiritual journey of a man who wanted forgiveness for his past misdeeds.

Malone stated that Todd believes he does not deserve forgiveness, which contributes to him embracing his worst qualities, something Malone felt worked better due to Howarth's acting choices, which prevented Todd from easily acquiring redemption. Malone felt the most important part of Todd's redemption was to have him re-confront Marty in order to better deal with the fact that he initiated her rape. As well as having Todd risk his freedom from prison and save Marty from a car crash, Todd donates his own blood to Marty to ensure she survives. A year later, he risks his life to save Patrick Thornhart, Marty's lover, from death; this act leads to Todd's presumed death. Despite having the character yearn to be thought of as a decent human being, the writers felt his good deeds should never make him feel any less horrible for having raped Marty. Initially, Howarth disagreed and did not consider the storylines to be redemptive. "[Todd's] not being redeemed at all," he said. "Todd, as I see it, is looking for a way to overcome this rage so he can live in society again. From now on, his menace will be on the surface, not exploding. It's more interesting if his violence is on the surface and that he play against it. That's where the subtlety is."

Hayward stated that the writers turned Todd from a realistic soap opera character into "the villain appropriated from nineteenth-century melodrama" and Gothic fiction traditions. After Todd is sent to prison for Marty's rape, he vows he will escape, and does so by drugging himself and by forcing himself to wake up from a coma, which allows him to escape from a speeding ambulance. He returns to Llanview to stalk and terrorize Nora, the lawyer who threw his court case, who had gone temporarily blind. He tries to rape Marty for the third time and later inadvertently kills Marty's boyfriend, Suede, during a scuffle, kidnaps the evangelist Rebecca Lewis, and is shot by the police, but survives. The writers also began to deepen his character by emphasizing his tenderness towards Rebecca and showing flashbacks of the abuse he experienced from his adoptive father, which Hayward states does not "historicize the problem but simply removes the cause of violence one step". Laurie Stone of the Village Voice commented that Howarth's performance steered Todd away from cartoon villainy, "heightening the character's wildness as a dodge from sentimentality and high-mindedness". Instead of killing Todd off as other soap operas had done to other unrepentant rapists, OLTL chose, as Stone put it, "to renovate the genre: maintaining Todd as a rapist, while enlarging his human dimension".

Stone addressed how the writers kept Todd on the OLTL canvas, stating, "Characters as dangerous as Todd go up in flames on soaps. You can see little coffins on their eyelids, leaving only one question: how will the fiend get whacked?" Stone said that "Todd was this close to being offed, but Howarth made that choice laughable. Rampaging through fictional Llanview, he injected ambiguity into the bluntest dialogue, his sneers averting cynicism to reveal depression and humor", and transformed Todd into a soul-wrenched Lucifer, his rage ripped from abuse and bathed in vengeful glee, his sexiness rising off his instinct for survival and his outlaw impulse to disrupt. She added, "Even the ragged scar he acquired on one cheek only heightened his animal appeal. No soap would jettison such gold and electricity—a figure simultaneously furious, ironic, melancholy, and horny".

The writers used strong imagery to redeem Todd. Malone, a novelist known for his "Dickensian" plots on OLTL, was influenced by 19th-century literature. Malone told Stone that he compared Rebecca's decision to marry Powell instead of Todd to Cathy's decision to marry Edgar Linton instead of Heathcliff in Wuthering Heights. According to Stone, Todd is a classical character−"a soap character of unprecedented psychological complexity, a being whose feelings are intrinsically mixed and mostly unresolvable". Hayward stated that Malone and his team of writers used four techniques drawn from the conventions of Victorian sentimental fiction to redeem Todd: his unhappy childhood with an aloof but caring mother and abusive father; sending Todd to church to confess his past sins and present impulses; his love for Rebecca, "an innocent and highly religious virgin"; and his friendship with two children, C.J. and Sarah Roberts. Hayward calls Rebecca, with her "open-mouthed passivity" and "pre-Raphaelite curls", "almost a caricature of Dicken's more sentimental and less felicitous heroines". She believes that many of Todd's scenes with Rebecca are heavily iconic, with symbolic representations of the Virgin Mary and Freudian images of Todd's own feminization.

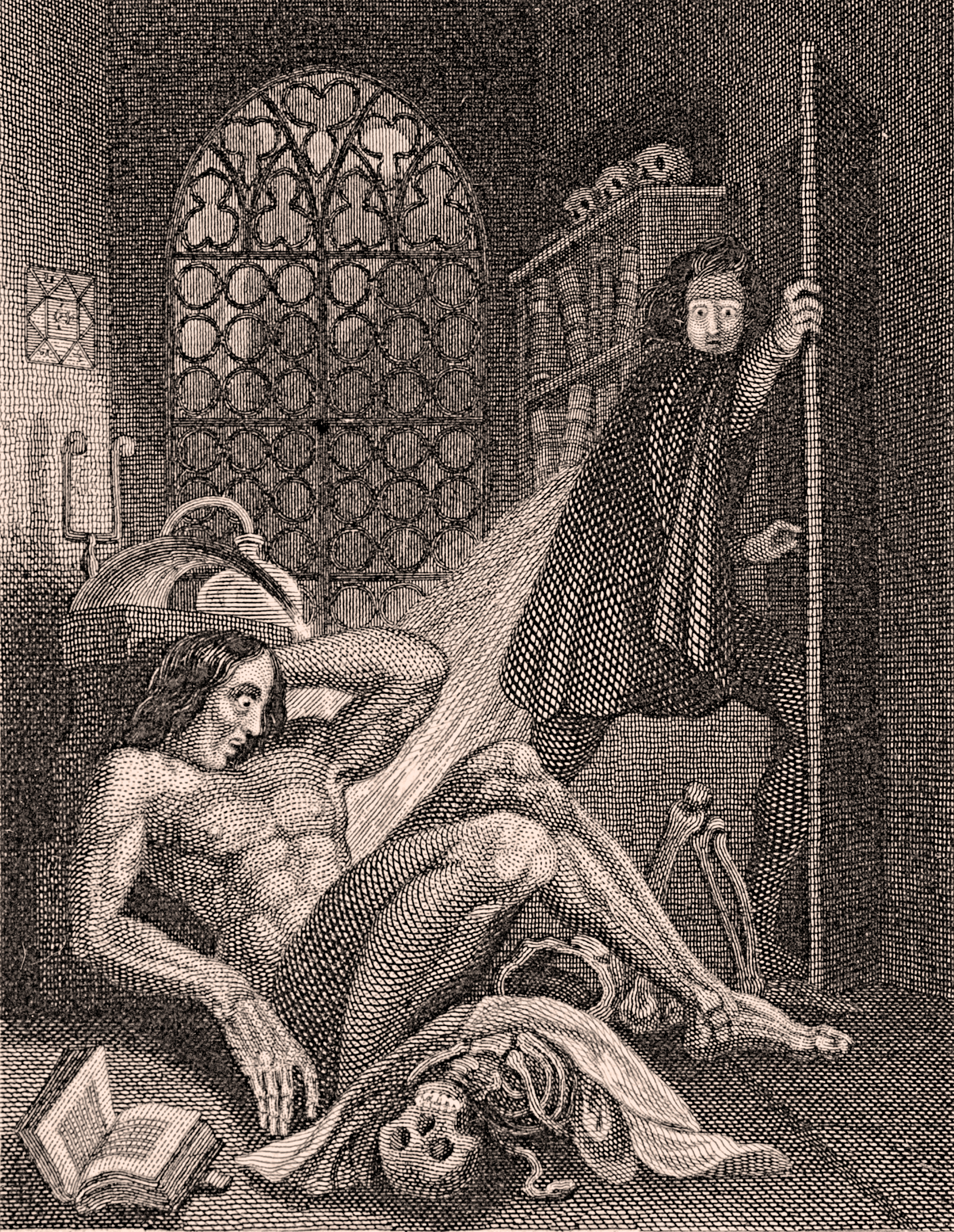
The show's writers used aspects of Frankenstein to add more depth to Todd, and to make him more sympathetic to the audience.

Hayward compares Todd to Mary Shelley's monster (Frankenstein's monster), especially in his friendship with C.J. and Sarah. Shelley's monster watches two children playing and saves a young girl from drowning. Similarly, Todd rescues C.J. and Sarah's cousin, Jessica, from being manhandled by an older boy; this leads to him meeting C.J. and Sarah. Like Shelley's monster, Todd observes the family's happy moments from afar and wishes to be part of their lives. He uses his time alone to make toys for the children. Once they accidentally discover him, he manipulates them into keeping his whereabouts a secret by telling them he is "a genie on the run from an evil master". Hayward said, "The stories he tells them function as clear metaphors for his feelings about his father." Stone added that Todd's counseling sessions in prison were the writers' attempts to redeem Todd, and both she and Hayward include one of the final techniques the writers used: Todd's rescue of Marty, Jessica, and C.J. soon after a car crash. Hayward calls the writers' attempts to use powerful narrative and visual techniques to redeem Todd "dubious at best".

Writer Mary Buhl Dutta believed that OLTL, in order to "assuage the moral qualms associated with a sympathetic rapist", added "mitigating reasons for Todd's sexual abuse of Marty"; namely, that he was raped at the age of fourteen by his adoptive father, Peter Manning, though whether or not he was raped is disputed. Gerry Waggett, for example, disagrees with Dutta that Todd was raped by Peter Manning. Dutta feels that the gang rape storyline invokes many of the rape myths that have appeared in literature since the 18th century, which include "only bad girls get raped," "women ask for it," and "women 'cry rape' only when they've been jilted or have something to cover up". Dutta also includes the myth of the "reformed rake", or "the rapist redeemed by the woman who loves him, not uncommonly the same woman he raped", which "deny or reduce perceived injury, or ... blame the victims for their own victimization". Dutta states, "Todd's redemption begins with his rescue of Marty and two children from a car wreck and ends with the discovery that he is the rightful heir to a huge fortune".

== Works cited ==
- Brooks, Dianne L. (1997). "Rape on Soaps: The Legal Angle". In Fineman, Martha; McCluskey, Martha T. (eds.). Feminism, Media, and the Law. New York: Oxford University Press. pp. 104–119. ISBN 978-0-19-509628-6.
- Dutta, Mary Buhl (Spring 1999). "Taming the Victim: Rape in Soap Opera". (1): 35". Journal of Popular Film & Television. 27 (1): 34–39.
- Hayward, Jennifer (1997). Consuming Pleasures: Active Audiences and Serial Fictions from Dickens to Soap Opera. Lexington, Kentucky: The University Press of Kentucky. ISBN 0-8131-2025-X.
- Waggett, Gerry (2008). The One Life to Live 40th Anniversary Trivia Book: A Fun, Fact-Filled, Everything-You-Want-to-Know-Guide to Your Favorite Soap. New York: Hyperion Books. ISBN 1-4013-2309-X.
