= Téa Delgado =

- One Life to Live character
- Portrayed by: Florencia Lozano
- Duration: 1997–2000; 2002; 2008–2013
- First appearance: January 27, 1997
- Last appearance: August 19, 2013
- Created by: Jean Passanante and Peggy Sloane
- Introduced by: Maxine Levinson (1997); Gary Tomlin (2002); Frank Valentini (2008); Jennifer Pepperman (2013)
- Crossover appearances: General Hospital
In-universe information
- Other names: Téa Manning
- Occupation: Lawyer
- Parents: Leon Delgado; Anna Delgado
- Siblings: Tomás Delgado; Anna Rosa Delgado; Delmonico Delgado
- Spouse: Todd Manning (1997–99) (Note: The first ceremony for Todd and Téa was on July 15, 1997. The marriage was annulled in 1998. The second marriage between them took place the same year until their divorce in 1999. However, they were married consecutively from 1997–99.); Ross Rayburn (2002–09); Victor Lord Jr. (2009–) (Note: They have been married consecutively since 2009.)
- Children: Danielle Manning; Victor Lord III (stillborn)
- Stepchildren: Sam Manning
- Grandparents: Maria Delgado
- Nieces and nephews: Roseanne Delgado; Baz Moreau
- First cousins: Enrique Delgado

Téa Delgado is a fictional character from the American daytime drama One Life to Live. The role was portrayed by Florencia Lozano from January 27, 1997, to March 2, 2000, and briefly in 2002. Lozano returned to the role once again on December 5, 2008, and remained through the original television finale aired January 13, 2012. In April 2012, Lozano become the latest One Life to Live actress to join General Hospital with her alter ego. Scheduled to premiere in May, with Roger Howarth (Todd Manning) returning with her, she premiered on the series on May 9, 2012, last appearing December 3, 2012. Lozano reprised the role when daily episodes of One Life to Live debuted on Hulu, iTunes, and FX Canada via The Online Network April 29, 2013.

Téa was conceived as a character with a stern but passionate personality. She became one of the show's most popular characters and part of one of soap opera's most popular romances for her complex and volatile pairing with Todd Manning, a troubled and sometimes villainous character on the series. Soaps In Depth stated that Téa "set the small screen ablaze" during her time on One Life to Live.

== Background ==
=== Character creation and portrayal ===
Téa Delgado was designed as the "tough-talking, yet soft-hearted attorney" of the series. The writers gave her a fragile personality, layering her as someone capable of showing great love and who is also "dying to be loved herself". One moment, Téa is seen as fiery and enraged; the next, she is witnessed as being soft-spoken and understanding. Having perfected these aspects of the character when paired with Roger Howarth's Todd Manning, actress Florencia Lozano acknowledged Howarth's help. "He's not an actor who's in his own world," she said. Todd had been romantically involved with Blair Cramer for some time already, and his divorce from her and custody pursuit of his daughter, Starr, soon positioned Lozano's character as a new love interest for Todd.

The pace of the soap opera was at times overwhelming for Lozano, and she looked for a way to manage this. "I try to keep feeding the fire, feeding some of the emotional stuff that Téa had to go through," she stated. "It's tiring because, on some level, I have to go there. I have to feel sad. I don't know any other way to do it." Detailing what she thinks about in order to produce onscreen tears, a query she often received from fans, Lozano stated, "Well...things that would make me cry. It's hard sometimes, but also it feels good when I feel like I portrayed something honestly." Having a good grasp on who Téa is provided Lozano with enough room to "make things up" even while keeping her character true to form. In addition, she looked to make each scene unique. "That's the thing about acting," she said. "When you're rehearsing over and over, how do you make it new every time? Well, it is new every time because it's the first time you've done it that time." Lozano saw each take as an opportunity to improve, rather than as something to be annoyed by, commenting, "I love it when we screw up, because we get another chance to do it, and every time it's a different scene." Lozano added, however, that she does enjoy perfecting her scenes. "It makes me really happy when I feel like I kicked ass in a scene," she stated.

Not every character action was originally in the script. "A lot of the times," Lozano said, "someone [would] make me laugh, and then my next line [would] be about responding to that. Any number of things [could] happen, which are usually the best moments. I [wanted] to be open to that. But it's hard, too, because I [didn't] want to screw up my lines." She further relayed, "There are many times when I think I didn't get a scene. When you don't feel anything, it's frustrating. I'm less hard on myself because I realize how difficult what we do is. But, as an actor, you hope that you go in there and get caught up in the moment. I think, self-indulgently, that's why we become actors in the first place — to feel things."

=== Todd and Téa ===
Roger Howarth as Todd Manning and Florencia Lozano as Téa Delgado.

One Life to Live viewers originally resisted Todd being paired with anyone but Blair. Soap Opera Digest stated that Téa not only did not have any history with Todd, "she was breaking up One Life to Live's most popular (if unorthodox) duo". The magazine added that it was Lozano's "consistently strong and convincing portrayal" of Téa as the tough but soft attorney that won viewers over. Viewers saw immediate chemistry between Howarth and Lozano.

Todd and Téa's marriage is at first nothing more than a business deal; Todd offers Téa to be his wife and lawyer for $5 million to ensure custody of his daughter (Starr). He is out for revenge against ex-wife Blair, feeling she ruined his chances at happiness when he returned to town after being presumed dead and discovered her having sex with Patrick Thornhart (Thorsten Kaye) on the floor of the penthouse he once shared with her. It is after this Todd shuts down emotionally, almost completely. He subsequently only shows kindness to his daughter and his sister (Victoria Lord), and occasionally to children. Soaps In Depth stated, "Téa being Todd's wife often put her in conflict with wife No. 1 and No. 2 — Blair." During one heated confrontation, the women's argument becomes physical. Lozano said "I'll never forget the time I crashed out the window. Kassie DePaiva (Blair) had to push me, and she was so nervous about really hurting me that I actually had to calm her down."

With Téa in his life, the writers had the emotional walls Todd had built around himself slowly collapse. As Soaps In Depth described it, Téa is the one who made Todd's heart "grow at least two sizes bigger". While Todd's tough bravado and insensitivity are lessened in Téa's presence, his reluctance to be sexually intimate becomes a prominent obstacle for the couple. After having felt betrayed by Blair with Patrick, Todd not only has trouble letting another woman into his psyche but also into his bed. This factor often causes Téa to be sexually frustrated while near Todd. Although they have agreed to keep their relationship platonic, she finds him sexually attractive and starts to desire him romantically. The writers often emphasized this, at one point having Téa strip down naked in front of Todd and plead for him to have sex with her, to which Todd painfully and angrily throws her out of their penthouse into the cold. He explains his reaction as being more about not being ready than actually rejecting Téa.

Todd and Téa's romance was written as tempestuous, star-crossed, loving, and abusive. The pairing would go from almost having sex one minute, to verbally abusing each other the next. Physical abuse takes place in one instance when Todd is on the run from the police and proceeds to kidnap Téa; he punches her out when she implies he will rape her as he had done to Marty Saybrooke (Susan Haskell) years earlier; Téa later knocks Todd out with a shovel to escape. However, during these scenes, the characters' love for each other continues to show; Todd releases a mournful, monstrous scream after having knocked Téa unconscious and relaxing her body on a chair in front of him, and Téa is seen to seemingly sexually desire Todd even while having tied him up after her attack on him. A disappointed Téa calls Todd a rapist after his kidnapping of her, which is a breaking point for Todd. She is one of the few people to believe that there is good in him. When she gives indication she now sees him as his enemies do, it is as much a slight to Todd's well-being as anything physical. "Téa called Todd a rapist," Lozano said. "By saying out loud that he's a rapist, it was the only way she could push him away. She needed those weapons, both verbal and emotional, to cut the tie because it had been so strong."

When working alongside Howarth, Lozano never felt as though she was simply reciting lines. She said, "I feel like we're just talking, listening and responding to each other. And that makes it relatively easy to concentrate. I feel like we're connecting." She called on her imagination, adding, "I do a lot of substituting. I think, 'What if Todd were a real person in my life?' The situations are so dramatic that in some ways it's easy to feel worked up."

Further differentiating Todd and Téa from other couples on the series was the application of theme music. Dark, sad but romantic theme music was applied to the pairing. Composer David Nichtern explained the emotion he wanted to convey. "This was kind of as close as we get to Todd 'romantic' music," he said. "It's still dark and mysterious, but has the possibility of a little sensuality and romance. I worked on these cues with my pal Kevin Bents (who does a lot of the keyboard work on the show) but when it came time for the demented variations, I just had to be alone (just kidding)."

While characters on the series have struggled to understand Téa's love for Todd, the writers made the pairing's love story detailed enough in its complexity for viewers to comprehend.

== Reception ==
Téa became one of One Life to Live's most popular characters. Her romantic pairing with Todd was described as "one of the hottest stories to hit daytime television". Fans enjoyed the union and dubbed them "TnT" (for Todd and Téa). The pairing's popularity was seen as equal to rival couple Todd and Blair. This created an intense rivalry between the two fanbases, which became known as the "T&B vs. TnT" wars, and were some of the genre's most notorious Internet battles. They left writers and producers with the task of deciding which couple would be the "true love" couple. In addition, viewers enjoyed the battles between Blair and Téa, which became one of soap opera's most entertaining rivalries. Although Todd and Téa were promoted as a dysfunctional pairing, they were prominently featured in commercials advertising their love story, voted "Best Couple" and "Best Romance" in soap opera magazines, and cited as "television at its best".

Howarth left the role of Todd in 1998. When he later returned as the character in 2000 for a one-week stint to persuade Téa to leave with him, it was one of the show's most anticipated events. He returned again as Todd later that year without Téa. When the return was first reported, fans queried whether Téa would be returning with the character. An emphatic "No!" was issued by Lozano's agent in what was deemed "an angry statement" to magazine Soaps in Depth. The agent added, "Give it up, guys! Stop calling!" Viewers wondered how the show would explain Téa no longer being with Todd, and heavily campaigned for the series to reunite the pairing. The writers had Todd explain that Téa had left him in the middle of the night, with a letter saying that she could no longer be with him. Determined not to be alone, Todd is soon seen going after Blair, wanting the family he once had with her. This did not deter fans of the Todd and Téa romance from campaigning for the couple. In 2002, their campaign was successful when Lozano agreed to return to the series for a brief stint. The opportunity to work with Howarth again was one of the reasons Lozano decided to return. "It's a lot of fun to work opposite Roger," she said. "There is so much going on beneath the surface."

The writers scripted Todd and Téa's reunion to take place following Blair, betrayed by Todd again, having left him; it was a live-week for the series, something that had not been done in almost twenty years in the history of soap opera. Soaps In Depth stated that with a shout-out to fans, Téa made her return entrance by stating, "I'm baaack!" with "a gleam in her eye" while interrupting Antonio and Carlotta Vega's bilingual bickering before visiting Todd. Not long after visiting Todd, the two are shipwrecked with one of Todd's employees after coming face to face for the first time in two years on a boat Todd had planned to use in order to kidnap his children from Blair. Regarding Todd and Téa being stranded together on a deserted island, former head writer Gary Tomlin, who was new to the series at the time, explained, "They both realize the mistakes they've made. Téa starts to see why she fell in love with him. The same thing for him. He's thinking that if they ever get off this island, they can go back and he can share his life with her — a life including his kids." While Todd does not declare his love for Téa, he "opens up" to Téa in "his own special way". Tomlin elaborated, "He makes the decision not to run away and deal with what he needs to deal with. [Todd and Téa were cast away in the first place because] we wanted to address Todd's relationship with the past." Tomlin further relayed, "It was also a way to finally satisfy Todd and Téa fans, who have been campaigning for a reunion since Florencia Lozano left the show in 2000. I don't know if Todd and Blair could have stayed together. Had he stayed in Llanview, it's possible that Téa would have come back, and we would have dealt with the situation in Llanview, with Blair being part of the dynamic."

Though Tomlin reunited Todd and Téa, seemingly having the pair on the path to their happy ending and scripting their first time having sex together (a long-awaited event by fans of the love story), he chose Todd and Blair as being the actual "true love" couple. This decision angered Todd and Téa fans, who expressed their anger through e-mails to the ABC network over Tomlin describing Todd's love for Blair as "the most genuine thing he has ever felt". Tomlin said that he had his reasons for telling the summer story the way he did and that the Todd and Téa fans have "convenient memories". He added, "When I went back to screen the Todd/Téa relationship — which everybody had said was so wonderful, that it was so this and so that, and they were so much in love — the thing that stuck out for me was when Todd punched Téa in the face and knocked her out. As a female viewer, I would have trouble getting past that. When you delve into physical abuse...it's a tough thing."

Todd being recast in 2003 with actor Trevor St. John after Howarth's departure from the series did not stop speculation that One Life to Live still planned to continue the Todd and Téa romance. In 2005, TV Guide reported the rumor, stating, "We recently came across an OLTL audition script for a scene between Todd and 'Lucia,' a woman who sounds a lot like his long-lost Latina legal eagle. So is a recast in the works? A show rep assures TVGuide.com that 'there are no plans to bring the character of Téa back to OLTL.'" It was surmised that if true, "Todd and Blair fans everywhere [could] breathe a major sigh of relief".

== See also ==
- Supercouple
- Todd Manning and Marty Saybrooke rape storylines
