= Thorsten Kaye =

German-British actor (born 1966)

- Born: Thorsten Ernst Kieselbach; 22 February 1966 (age 60); Frankfurt, Germany
- Citizenship: Germany; United Kingdom; United States of America
- Occupation: Actor
- Years active: 1991–present
- Partner: Susan Haskell
- Children: 2

Thorsten Kaye (born Thorsten Ernst Kieselbach, 22 February 1966) is a German-British-American actor. He is best known for his soap opera roles as Dr. Ian Thornhart on Port Charles, Zach Slater on All My Children and Ridge Forrester on The Bold and the Beautiful. For his performances, he received nine Daytime Emmy Award nominations for Outstanding Lead Actor in a Drama Series, winning the award twice, in 2023 and 2024, for his role as Ridge Forrester.

== Acting career ==
Kaye was born in Frankfurt, Federal Republic of Germany. He appeared in many classical theater roles, including The Winter's Tale, Tartuffe, Macbeth, Much Ado About Nothing, Hamlet, Love's Labour's Lost, Twelfth Night, and The Taming of the Shrew, both in London and with the Hilberry Repertory Company in Detroit.

Kaye then moved to Los Angeles, where he acted in many television shows, including the miniseries, Sidney Sheldon's Nothing Lasts Forever, before moving to New York to play Patrick Thornhart on ABC's One Life to Live (1995–1997). The character gained quite a bit of popularity, and it is where he would meet his real life partner, Susan Haskell. After completing a two-year stint on OLTL, Thorsten did some guest starring work for other shows, as well as starring in a few feature films.

In April 2000, Thorsten accepted the role of the dedicated physician Ian Thornhart (Patrick's older brother) on the ABC daytime soap (and the spin-off show of General Hospital), Port Charles (2000–2003). He appeared on the soap until its run ended in October 2003. Thorsten received two Daytime Emmy Award Nominations for Outstanding Lead Actor for his portrayal of Ian in 2003 and 2004.

In April 2004, Thorsten returned to New York to join the cast of the ABC soap All My Children in the role of casino owner, Zach Slater. He was nominated for two Daytime Emmy Awards in 2006 and 2009. Thorsten portrayed Slater until December 2009. He returned three times in 2010, and again in 2011 to bring Zach's storyline to a close when AMC came to an end after 41 years, in September 2011.

Thorsten Kaye has one of the lead roles in a new psychological thriller (feature-length film) titled Occupant, which was released in the U.S and Canada in October 2011 on demand in many cable/satellite markets as well as on most digital platforms, including iTunes, Amazon, Blockbuster, and PlayStation.

In 2012, Kaye began appearing in the role of Nick, a recurring character on the NBC series Smash. In October 2013, it was announced that Kaye was cast to portray Ridge Forrester on The Bold and the Beautiful, replacing originator Ronn Moss, who departed the series in 2012 after 25 years in the role. On 15 December 2023 Kaye became the first German-British to win the Daytime Emmy Award for Outstanding Lead Actor in a Drama Series, which he won for his portrayal of Ridge Forrester. He won again in 2024.

== Personal life ==
When not working, Kaye enjoys music, literature and riding American motorcycles. He is a fan of the Miami Dolphins and the Detroit Red Wings.

While appearing on One Life to Live, he met his partner, Susan Haskell, who played his on-show love interest (Margaret "Marty" Saybrooke). They have two daughters, McKenna (born February 2003) and Marlowe (born January 2007).

Kaye was an active blogger for the Detroit Red Wings at NHL.com during the 2008 and 2009 Stanley Cup Playoffs.

== Filmography ==
Film roles
Year	Title	Role	Notes
1996	The Silencers	Jasper	
2000	The Prophet's Game	Joey Highsmith (adult)	
2000	Shark Attack 2	Dr. Nick Harris	Direct-to-video
2011	Occupant	Joe	
2014	Animal	Carl	

Television roles
Year	Title	Role	Notes
1991	Deadly Desire	Airport Agent	TV film
1995	Nothing Lasts Forever	Jury Foreman	TV film
1995–1997	One Life to Live	Patrick Thornhart	Regular role
1998	Sliders	Ralph Hackett	Episode: "Asylum"
1999	Air America	Sam Moon	Episode: "Fear of Flying"
2000	Falcone	Isadore Rechelko	Episode: "Pilot"
2000–2003	Port Charles	Dr. Ian Thornhart	Regular role
2004–2011, 2013	All My Children	Zach Slater	Regular role
2012–2013	Smash	Nick Felder	Recurring role, 13 episodes
2013–present	The Bold and the Beautiful	Ridge Forrester	Regular role
2016	Falling Water	Javier Mendoza	Episode: "Castles Made of Sand"

== Awards and nominations ==
List of acting awards and nominations
Year	Award	Category	Title	Result	Ref.
1993	Soap Opera Digest Award	Outstanding Male Newcomer	One Life to Live	Nominated	
2001	Soap Opera Digest Award	Outstanding Hero	Port Charles	Nominated	
2003	Daytime Emmy Award	Outstanding Lead Actor in a Drama Series	Port Charles	Nominated	
2003	Soap Opera Digest Award	Outstanding Lead Actor	Port Charles	Nominated	
2004	Daytime Emmy Award	Outstanding Lead Actor in a Drama Series	Port Charles	Nominated	
2005	Soap Opera Digest Award	Favourite Return	All My Children	Nominated	
2006	Daytime Emmy Award	Outstanding Lead Actor in a Drama Series	All My Children	Nominated	
2009	Daytime Emmy Award	Outstanding Lead Actor in a Drama Series	All My Children	Nominated	
2017	Soap Awards France	Best Actor of the Year	The Bold and the Beautiful	Nominated	
2017	Soap Awards France	Best Couple of the Year – "Caroline and Ridge" (shared with Linsey Godfrey)	The Bold and the Beautiful	Nominated	
2020	Daytime Emmy Award	Outstanding Lead Actor in a Drama Series	The Bold and the Beautiful	Nominated	
2020	Soap Hub Awards	Favorite The Bold and the Beautiful Actor	The Bold and the Beautiful	Nominated	
2021	Daytime Emmy Award	Outstanding Lead Actor in a Drama Series	The Bold and the Beautiful	Nominated	
2023	Daytime Emmy Award	Outstanding Lead Actor in a Drama Series	The Bold and the Beautiful	Won	
2024	Daytime Emmy Award	Outstanding Lead Actor in a Drama Series	The Bold and the Beautiful	Won	
2026	Daytime Emmy Award	Outstanding Lead Actor in a Drama Series	The Bold and the Beautiful	Nominated	

Preceded by Ronn Moss	Ridge Forrester (role); 2013–present	Incumbent
