= Michael Malone (author) =

American writer (1942–2022)

- Born: Michael Christopher Malone; November 22, 1942; Durham, North Carolina, U.S.
- Died: August 19, 2022 (aged 79); Clinton, Connecticut, U.S.
- Education: University of North Carolina at Chapel Hill; Harvard University
- Occupations: Author and television writer
- Writing career
- Notable work: One Life to Live

Michael Christopher Malone (November 22, 1942 – August 19, 2022) was an American author and television writer. He was noted for his work on the ABC Daytime drama One Life to Live, as well as for his novels Handling Sin (1983), Foolscap (1991), and the murder mystery First Lady (2002).

== Early life ==
Malone was born in Durham, North Carolina, on November 22, 1942. His father worked as a psychiatrist; his mother was a teacher who was deaf. His family relocated to Atlanta when he was six years old. He lived with his mother after his parents divorced. He studied English at the University of North Carolina at Chapel Hill, graduating in 1964. He then obtained a master's degree from that institution two years later. Although he commenced a Doctor of Philosophy in English at Harvard University, he dropped out before finishing his thesis.

== Career ==
Malone's first novel, Painting the Roses Red, was inspired in part by his new wife and released in 1975. He recounted that he had authored the book in order to put off writing his doctoral thesis. He ultimately published 14 novels during his career. One of these, Handling Sin (1983), retold Don Quixote with the Southern United States as its setting. Another book, Foolscap (1991), was about a university professor tasked with authoring an old playwright's biography, while First Lady, published in 2001, recounted a serial killer preying on women in a fictitious North Carolina town and became a bestseller. Malone set many of his stories in Piedmont, including First Lady and the other Justin & Cuddy novels, in his region of North Carolina.

Outside of writing books, Malone became best known for his stint writing the soap opera One Life to Live. He was the serial's head writer after being hired by Linda Gottlieb from 1991 to 1996 and garnered critical acclaim for his storylines, which included a tale involving the tight bond between an ostracized homosexual teenager and a preacher, the creation of villain/rapist Todd Manning and the character's gang rape of Marty Saybrooke, as well as the subsequent rape trial. Entertainment Weekly wrote that OLTL was "airing some of the most literate drama ever to hit daytime – too good to be called 'soap opera.'"

One Life to Live was averaging 5 million viewers when Malone left in 1996. After that, he co-created 13 Bourbon Street for Fox, but it was never materialized. His next soap opera writing job was with Another World in 1997. He returned to write One Life to Live from 2003 to 2004. While writing One Life to Live, Malone wrote a novel called The Killing Club, which was tied into the show. For months, viewers watched character Marcie Walsh (Kathy Brier) write the book. The book was published in February 2005 with the authors listed as Marcie Walsh and Michael Malone. To explain this, Marcie said she took the book to "Professor Malone" at Llanview University, who helped her re-write it. After Malone's departure from the show, Dena Higley continued this storyline, as a copycat killer murdered characters on the show exactly as had occurred in the book. In its first week of publication The Killing Club went to No. 16 on The New York Times Best Seller list for Hardback Fiction. It later rose to No. 11.

== Personal life ==
Malone was married to Maureen Quilligan, a professor of English at Duke University, for 47 years until his death. They met while he was studying at Harvard. Together, they had one child (Maggie). They resided in Hillsborough, North Carolina, from 2000, while maintaining a second home in Connecticut. Malone was a board member and a supporter of the Burwell School Historic Site.

Malone died on August 19, 2022, at his home in Clinton, Connecticut. He was 79, and suffered from pancreatic cancer for over a decade prior to his death.

== Writing credits ==
Another World

- Head writer: April 1997 – December 1997 (hired by Charlotte Savitz)

One Life to Live

- Head writer: September 9, 1991 – 1996 (hired by Linda Gottlieb); March 2004 – November 24, 2004
- Co-head writer: March 10, 2003 – March 22, 2004 (with Josh Griffith)
- Story Consultant: February 3, 2003 – March 7, 2003 (hired by Brian Frons)

13 Bourbon Street

- TV pilot (co-written with Josh Griffith & produced by Linda Gottlieb)

== Publications ==
=== Books ===
- (1975) Painting the Roses Red. New York: Random House. ISBN 9780394495989
- (1976) The Delectable Mountains: Or, Entertaining Strangers. Sourcebooks Landmark, ISBN 1-4022-0006-4.
- (1977) Psychetypes : a new way of exploring personality ISBN 9780671820039
- (1979) Heroes of Eros : male sexuality in the movies ISBN 9780525475521
- (1980) Dingley Falls. Sourcebooks Landmark, ISBN 1-4022-0007-2.
- (1983) Handling Sin. Sourcebooks Landmark, ISBN 1-57071-756-7.
- (1983) Uncivil Seasons. Sourcebooks Landmark, ISBN 1-57071-755-9.
- (1989) Time's Witness. Sourcebooks Landmark, ISBN 1-57071-754-0.
- (1991) Foolscap: Or, the Stages of Love. Sourcebooks Landmark, ISBN 1-57071-757-5.
- (2001) First Lady. Sourcebooks Landmark, ISBN 1-57071-971-3.
- (2002) Red Clay, Blue Cadillac: Stories of Twelve Southern Women. Sourcebooks Landmark, ISBN 1-57071-824-5.
- (2002) The Last Noel. Sourcebooks Landmark, ISBN 1-4022-0147-8.
- (2005) The Killing Club. Hyperion, ISBN 1-4013-0156-8. (co-credited with Marcie Walsh, based on a story by Josh Griffith)
- (2009) "The Four Corners Of The Sky" Sourcebooks Landmark, ISBN 9781570717444

=== Short stories ===
- "Red Clay" (can be found in Best American Mystery Stories of the Century, published by Houghton Mifflin)

(Recipient of the 1997 Edgar Award for Best Short Story)

- "Blue Cadillac"
- "Murdered for Love"

== Awards ==
- Writers Guild of America Award for Television: Daytime Serials (1992) – One Life to Live
- Daytime Emmy Award for Outstanding Drama Series Writing Team (1994) – One Life to Live
