= Marty Saybrooke =

- One Life to Live character
- Susan Haskell as Marty Saybrooke
- Portrayed by: Susan Haskell (1992–2005, 2008–2011); Christina Chambers (2006–2007)
- Duration: 1992–1997; 2004–2011
- First appearance: January 15, 1992
- Last appearance: June 6, 2011
- Created by: Michael Malone
- Introduced by: Linda Gottlieb (1992); Frank Valentini (2004)
- Book appearances: Patrick's Notebook
- Christina Chambers as Marty Saybrooke
In-universe information
- Other names: Jessica Brennan; Marty Moody; Marty Laurence; Margaret Saybrooke
- Occupation: Psychiatrist
- Parents: David Saybrooke; Samantha Adams Saybrooke
- Spouse: Dylan Moody (1996); Patrick Thornhart (1997–present); Miles Laurence (2007)
- Sons: Cole Thornhart
- Granddaughters: Hope Manning-Thornhart
- Aunts: Kiki Saybrooke

Marty Saybrooke is a fictional character from One Life to Live, an American soap opera. The role was originated by Susan Haskell, who portrayed Marty from January 15, 1992, through September 16, 1997, and made brief appearances on February 16, 2004, and February 2005. Christina Chambers portrayed the role from November 17, 2006, to December 4, 2007, with the character written off for "storyline reasons." Haskell later returned as Marty on June 11, 2008, and left on June 6, 2011.

The character became a show heroine, and her 1993 gang rape led by Todd Manning is considered one of soap opera's "most remembered and impactful" storylines.

== Creation and development ==
=== Casting and writing ===
Margaret Bedford Saybrooke was created by Michael Malone, named after his daughter, Margaret, and the town in Connecticut in which he lived. Marty was conceived as a short-term role. The series had just scripted the death of character Megan Gordon Harrison (Jessica Tuck) from the life-threatening disease lupus. Not wanting viewers to think that lupus is always fatal, they decided to introduce Marty as a character who survives the disease. "The character was planned to be part of just one story line", said then-executive producer Susan Bedsow Horgan. "But [Haskell] is such a wonderful actress that we wanted to write more for her."

Marty was soon characterized as representing "the destructive, privileged, college girl – sexually promiscuous and with a serious drinking problem". She is at first positioned as causing significant problems for character Reverend Andrew Carpenter (Wortham Krimmer). She develops a crush on him, but he does not respond to her romantic advances. For revenge, she spreads a rumor that he is gay and is having a sexual affair with underage, gay teenage boy Billy Douglas (Ryan Phillippe). Scandal erupts, but Andrew's reputation is eventually restored. Marty's, however, is blackened even further. Although she does later express deep regret for inciting the scandal.

When head writer Michael Malone decided to write a gang rape storyline, he started to transition Marty from being primarily bad to being primarily sympathetic. Through further development, the writers "explained her cynicism and self-destructive behavior as the result of her being orphaned: Her parents had died when she was quite young, leaving her to be raised by a selfish aunt." The series continued Marty's redemption, and she eventually became the show's main heroine through seeking justice for her gang rape.

=== Portrayals ===
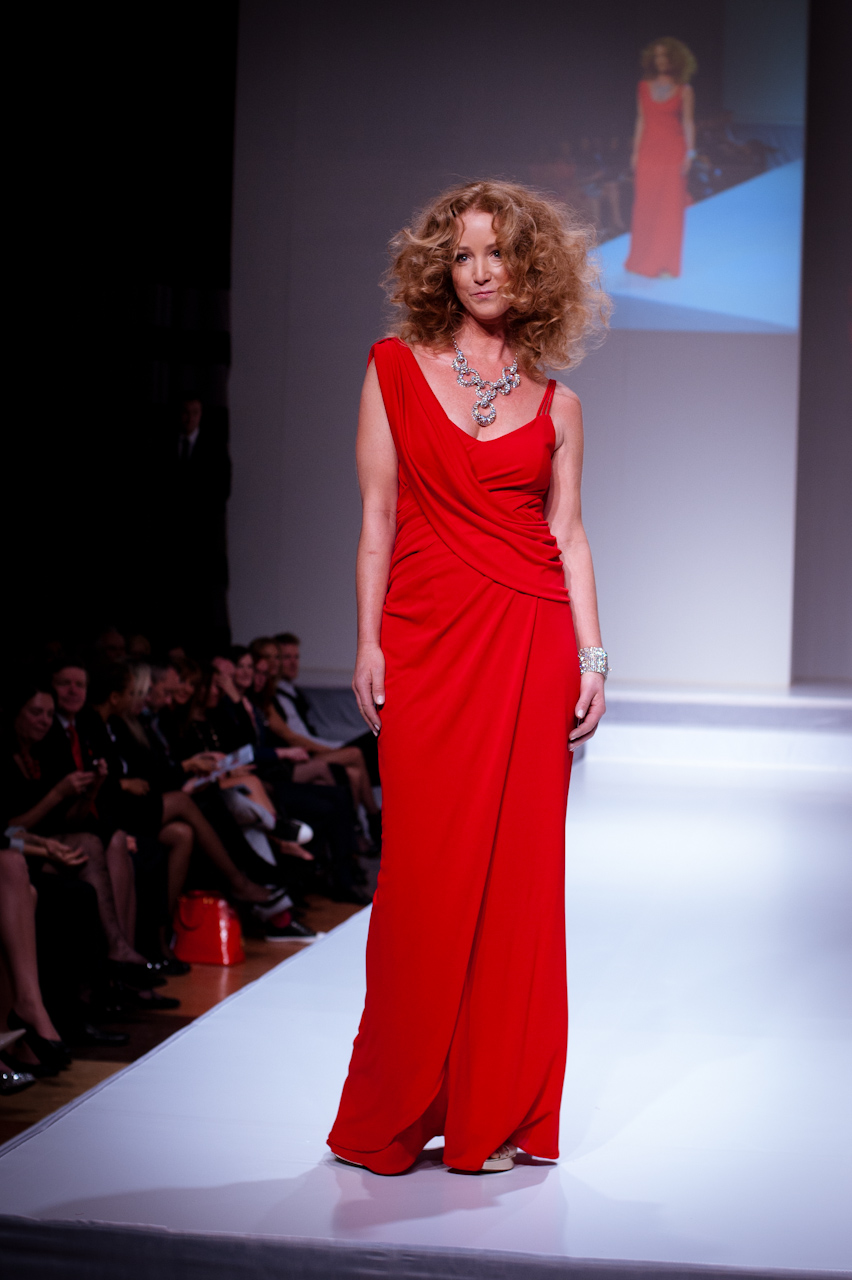
Haskell (pictured in 2012) compares herself to Marty.

Haskell stated of Marty, "She's strong and tough, and she really doesn't trust anyone. She just wants to love and be loved, but that hasn't worked for her yet." Haskell compared Marty to herself. "I always think if she'd had the life I had, we'd probably be very similar", she said.

In 2006, Chambers stepped into the role (Haskell was unavailable at the time due to her real-life pregnancy). When asked if she thought "fans had a little trouble separating how the character was written this time around from the fact that this is a new face playing the character", she said. "Whenever you do a recast, it's always going to be a little bit of a struggle. It's unfortunate that they picked up with Marty 15 years in soap time down the road." Chambers stated, "I think the fans were ready to pick up 15 years ago with the character with her traits and that's not what was given to them."

Haskell later returned as Marty on June 11, 2008. When asked what was it like to start portraying the character again, she stated, "It's great. I was a little nervous. It's been a long time... But I've gotta say that everyone's made it so easy there. They've been very accommodating." She said, "It's like going home.... And now the role is even more complex. What a gift. It's a great character. She's not your run-of-the-mill character. Her life has been up and down. Now it's even more complicated."

Frank Valentini, the show's executive producer, helped to come up with a schedule for Haskell's return, since she was initially busy taking care of her newborn child. "[He] knew that from the beginning. When he contacted me I was like, 'This is the deal.' He knew this wasn't a full-time thing for me this time", she said. "And the way they shoot the shows now, it's easier. It wasn't like when I was there before and you had all day for one show." Haskell stated they had "a fantastic nanny who's been with me since the baby was born. And Thorsten's mom is also nearby, so when I'm gone for the day, both of them are here."

Haskell said she decided to return to the series for a longer stint because she trusted Valentini and knew Ron Carlivati was back in charge as head writer. "And I knew that he was aware of the character. That was one of the concerns about the previous head writer [Dena Higley]", stated Haskell. "She really didn't seem to. But you know, I feel safe there and it's not my first time around, so if I've got questions or ideas, we'll all just figure them out together." Haskell felt that an amnesia-stricken Marty was a good idea, and was interested in working with Trevor St. John (current Todd) and Michael Easton as John McBain.

Haskell asked Valentini to send her information about what her character had done since she last portrayed the role. "...[H]e said, 'Oh, you don't have to worry about that. She doesn't remember.' Okay! Great! You don't even know how much help that was for me", stated Haskell. She said she did "put a lot of thought into" how her character would be now, but that "it comes back to you, it really does. The most prep I did was learning my stinking lines. That was where I was the most out of practice. Gotta get that muscle going again."

== Storylines ==
=== 1992–97 ===
Marty Saybrooke is the scion of one of Llanview's oldest and most prestigious families. Orphaned at an early age, "poor little rich girl" Marty grows up alone in her family's mansion and is the sole heiress to her parents' fortune. Marty comes to be a troubled young woman who resorts to binge-drinking to garner attention.

On January 24, 1992, Marty is introduced as the roommate of the ailing Megan Gordon Harrison during her stay at Llanview Hospital. Both Megan and Marty are diagnosed with lupus, but Marty has chosen to ignore the consequences of her hard-partying lifestyle, which has exacerbated the symptoms of her dangerous disease. Despite her rough exterior, it is clear that deep down, Marty has a wounded heart. After Megan passes away, Marty becomes close to one of her neighbors, Megan's mother, Viki. She also becomes infatuated with Reverend Andrew Carpenter. When Andrew rebuffs Marty's advances, Marty launches a smear campaign across Llanview, using her knowledge of Billy Douglas' homosexuality against him, claiming that Andrew is gay and has been having illicit relations with young Billy. The rumor is eventually squelched, and Marty's reputation is severely tarnished.

Marty's life is forever changed when she meets cocky Llanview University defensive back Todd Manning and has a one-night stand with him. He rejects her immediately after the encounter, and she becomes bitter. Ladies' man Todd learns he has met his match when the flighty Marty rejects him the next day. Todd still pursues her, but Marty does not give in to his boorish and chauvinistic advances. A bitter resentment and rivalry develops between the two, particularly after Marty agrees to be Todd's tutor. Todd fails a crucial course due to lack of studying, is unable to stay on the football team, and he irrationally blames Marty for his failure, while still stung by her romantic rejection of him. He tells Marty's then-boyfriend that he and Marty slept together the night she was tutoring him, and Suede broke up with Marty, but Todd wasn't done with his revenge. His anger having reached a boiling point, Todd begins to plot the ultimate revenge on Marty. On May 10, 1993, when Marty becomes drunk at the "Spring Fling" party on campus, she is gang raped by Todd and two of his fraternity brothers, Zach Rosen and Powell Lord III. The day after, Marty runs to the aid of Reverend Andrew Carpenter, who takes her to get a rape exam. Marty refuses to press charges. Andrew, at first, accuses Suede of the rape, not knowing that Marty was gang raped. Marty eventually reports the rape after seeing the "four" boys at the country club, and Todd is arrested along with Zach, Powell, and Powell's distant cousin Kevin Buchanan (whom Marty mistakenly believes has also raped her). Marty has her doubts about Kevin's involvement, and he tries at every stop to convince her he is innocent, and that he was just trying to retrieve his keys that night. Placed on trial, the four men are represented by attorney Nora Hanen Gannon, ex-wife of District Attorney Hank Gannon and mother of Kevin's girlfriend Rachel Gannon. Nora believes Todd and the others are innocent and is clearly winning the trial, especially after Marty remembers that Kevin had nothing to do with the attack and exonerates him, which damages her case even further. Kevin, however, is grateful for Marty's confession and decides to help her win her case. He and Jason Webb (Dorian Lord's boyfriend at the time) find another young woman named Carol Swift, who reveals that Todd raped her as well. Disgusted, Nora accidentally causes a mistrial.

A furious Todd declares revenge on Marty. He corners her in an alley and threatens to rape her again, but Luna Moody comes to Marty's rescue and hits Todd across the face with a metal pipe, scarring Todd's face in the process. Powell witnesses the incident and tells the police. In addition, Marty manages to trick Todd into confessing to the rape, which she tape records. Todd is sent to jail, determined to get revenge on Marty, Nora, and Powell (whom Todd will learn years later is his biological cousin). Later Todd briefly escapes from jail, again threatens to rape Marty at gunpoint, resulting in Marty's boyfriend, Suede Pruitt's, attempting to come to her rescue and being killed during his struggle with Todd.

Marty's life remains turbulent even after Todd is convicted of his crimes; after finishing medical school, she revisits the past in a brief, foolhardy flirtation with Andrew Carpenter, who is tempted away from his new wife Cassie. Then, Marty grows close to Luna's brother Dylan. After the fugitive Todd saves Marty, Jessica Buchanan, and C.J. and Sarah Roberts from a car crash, he is pardoned and set free, enraging his former victim. Nonetheless, over time, Todd and Marty forge a strange kind of understanding and attempt to gain some closure. Todd encourages Marty to confront her aunt, Kiki, who is her guardian. Kiki, a society friend of Dorian's, has been raiding Marty's immense trust fund to finance her jet-set lifestyle. Marty travels to Ireland, where her aunt is staying, and succeeds in severing ties with her. While in Ireland, Marty meets and falls in love with poet and former Irish terrorist Patrick Thornhart, who is trying to escape some former criminal "associates". However, back in Llanview, a young AIDS patient whom Marty has cared for is dying. Todd travels to Ireland and lends Marty his private jet to fly back while he helps her newfound love, only to be mistaken for Patrick and allegedly killed by the assassins. Todd's pregnant wife, Blair Cramer, harbors great resentment toward Marty for her part in Todd's "death".

Upon her return to the States, Marty works with Patrick to help Bo Buchanan and the Llanview Police Department foil the plans of the Irish terrorist cell the "Men of 21". After an ill-advised marriage to the paralyzed Dylan, Marty admits her true love for Patrick and they finally reunite. Unfortunately, while still single, Patrick has already spent the night with a lonely Blair and conceived a child. Tragically, Blair loses the baby in a car accident, but Todd, now back from the dead, blames Patrick for Blair's loss, and contacts another of Patrick's old foes, IRA terrorist Mahoney. On the day of Patrick and Marty's wedding, Mahoney shoots Patrick, who appears to die in Marty's arms at Todd's penthouse. Marty sobs as she clutches her husband's body and tells Todd that Todd is not a man, but a curse. While in the ambulance with Patrick, however, Marty is shocked to discover Patrick is, in fact, still alive. Together, Marty and Patrick flee the country to live happily ever after, telling only friends Nora, Bo, and Mel Hayes of their fate, fearing reprisal from Patrick's enemies. In her cryptic letter, the newly-pregnant Marty tells Bo and Nora that they are expecting a daughter.

=== 2004–07 ===
Years later, Marty briefly reappears in early 2004 to testify on Todd's behalf when he is on trial for supposedly raping Blair; she explains that she is now openly living in California as a practicing psychiatrist working with sex offenders, and tells the court that she believes Todd is a "changed man". Despite never forgiving Todd for her rape, Marty believes that Todd is so traumatized, that he will never commit the crime of rape again. She urges Blair, who is unaware that she is suffering from a brain tumor, to reconsider her recollection of the night Todd "raped" her. Marty makes no mention of Patrick or their child, or how they have eluded the terrorists hunting the Thornharts. The following year, Marty appears again, as a hallucination of Todd's, taunting him after his rape and torture at the hands of Margaret Cochran. This spectre comments on the irony of "Margaret [raping] Todd", due to Marty's birth name also being Margaret.

Marty returns to Llanview on November 17, 2006 (now played by Christina Chambers). Marty is shocked to learn that her son, high school quarterback Cole (her child by Patrick), is being accused of attacking Todd and Blair's daughter, Starr. Marty reveals that she has just recently moved back to Llanview and has set up her practice, and that she and Cole are still reeling from Patrick's mysterious death. Todd, Blair, and Marty are all determined to keep their children apart.

Marty serves as psychiatric consult in the court case against the nefarious Dr. Spencer Truman, declaring him mentally unfit and thus sparing him a prison sentence, outraging Todd, Blair, and Llanview Chief of Detectives John McBain, whose father was killed by Spencer in Atlantic City. Later, when Spencer is killed while attempting to abduct and rape a hospitalized Blair, McBain is determined to find the culprit. Marty, meanwhile, begins having disturbing visions of being in Blair's hospital room on the night of the murder, and seeing a scalpel.

Marty confesses her fears of having killed Spencer to her therapist, but can not fully remember what her mind has blocked out from that fateful night. When the lovestruck Miles Laurence is determined to win Marty's heart, he takes extreme measures, stealing Marty's audiotaped "confession" from her therapist's office and blackmailing her with it, forcing Marty to marry him in order to retain custody of her son. Marty finally tells John McBain about her precarious situation, and John becomes determined to exonerate Marty, find Spencer's true murderer, and end Miles' sick game with Marty's life. Before John can learn the truth, however, the evidence against Marty becomes overwhelming, and she is arrested as the prime suspect in Truman's murder. John and Marty struggle to uncover the hazy details surrounding the night Spencer was killed, and eventually Marty remembers that she was never able to strike Spencer; instead, he assaulted her and left her in a vacant hospital room, leaving her with a head injury. Soon thereafter, John deduces that Lindsay Rappaport is the real murderer, and Marty is released from prison.

After being exonerated, Marty is determined to move forward with her life and end her marriage to Miles. A guilt-ridden Miles, having seen the error of his ways, helps the process along by confessing in open court to having blackmailed Marty into their marriage. Weeks later, Marty's marriage is annulled. Cole and Jessica Buchanan urge Marty to consider a romantic future with John McBain, but a bashful and unsure Marty refuses to consider it. Regardless, Marty seeks John out, and the two spend an afternoon walking the Llanview docks. At the close of the evening, Marty impulsively kisses John. Marty instantly apologizes, but an intrigued John tells her not to be sorry. They share a romantic kiss again soon after.

John and Marty continue to bond during the custody trial for Tommy McBain, but after Marcie McBain goes on the run with her adoptive son, John leaves Llanview to pursue his sister-in-law, along with Todd Manning. After John starts a barfight in Decatur, Georgia, he and Todd are arrested. Marty and Blair go down to Decatur and bail them out. Marty and Blair insist on joining John and Todd as they search for Marcie in the hopes of preventing the two enemies from killing each other. After the group hits the road, John's car breaks down, and the quartet is forced to get a room at a local motel. Initially there is only one room available but Todd uses his "charm" and money to obtain a room from one of the other guests. Marty and John spend the night together in the first room. During the evening, John opens up to Marty about the murder of his former fiancee, Caitlin Fitzgerald, and explains that Lee Ramsey, the FBI agent pursuing Marcie, holds a grudge against him because of Caitlin's death. Marty in turn confides in John about Patrick's murder. She reveals that Patrick was killed by old enemies from Ireland, and that his old friend Simon Ryerson came to her door to give her the news. Having bonded by unburdening themselves, John and Marty end up making love.

After Cole is abducted back in Llanview by a mysterious man in a "Death" costume, another unseen figure shows up at John and Marty's motel room and grabs her just as she gets a call from Starr on Cole's cell phone. Marty and Cole are taken to Ireland and held hostage by none other than Patrick's "old friend" Simon, who was actually the terrorist who killed Patrick. Simon is determined to get an incriminating "list of names" which Patrick kept from his days with the "Men of 21", but is frustrated to discover that Marty has no knowledge of the list; in reality, Patrick hid the list on a microchip inside one of his own poetry books. John finds the chip, and he and Lee Ramsey pursue Marty and Cole overseas and make contact with Simon in Ireland. They set a time and meeting for an exchange: Marty and Cole for Patrick's microchip. Things seem to be going as planned, until Ramsey fires upon the van which contains Marty and Cole in an attempt to apprehend the terrorists. The van spins out of control and goes careening over a cliff. Racing to the bottom of the rock quarry, John struggles to free Marty from the wrecked van, but she insists that he find Cole first, saying she has no life without her son. John reluctantly leaves her side and is able to rescue Cole, who was thrown from the van in the crash, but watches helplessly as the van explodes. Marty is presumed dead, and the bereaved John and Cole return to Llanview.

In the aftermath of Marty's death, her loved (and not-so-loved) ones deal with her loss in their own way: John discovers her posthumous Christmas gift, a dartboard with Todd's face on it; Cole undertakes grief counseling with friend Langston Wilde; and Todd quietly orders a lavish flower arrangement for her memorial service, without leaving his name.

=== 2008–11 ===
In the spring of 2008, John becomes suspicious about Ramsey's shady activities since becoming Police Commissioner of Llanview. Banding together with fellow police officers Antonio Vega and Talia Sahid, John works to expose Ramsey as a dirty cop and avenge Marty's death. During the course of their investigation, the trio learn about a mysterious woman Ramsey is keeping hidden away in his penthouse, tended to by a private nurse. John becomes convinced that this woman is key to unraveling the mystery behind Ramsey's double dealings. As it happens, John's suspicions are correct: Ramsey masterminds the theft of the crown jewels of Mendorra from Lindsay Rappaport's art gallery in order to fence them and pay for his houseguest's costly medical care. It becomes clear that the mystery woman is not merely bedridden, but also mentally impaired due to her unknown ailments. Meanwhile, John's curiosity deepens when he discovers X-rays in Ramsey's office which detail the severe physical trauma of an unidentified female patient.

John has a surveillance device planted inside Ramsey's penthouse. John, Antonio, and Talia stake out the building, waiting for Ramsey or his guest to come into audio range of their "bug". On June 11, 2008, the officers listen in as Ramsey speaks to the woman, who says only two words on tape before the surveillance device goes out of range: "help me". As John struggles to identify the familiar voice, it is revealed that the mystery woman being cared for by Lee Ramsey is none other than Marty.

Ramsey is working with con artist Tina Lord, the Crown Princess of Mendorra, who he plans to sell the Mendorran crown jewels to in order to provide for the crippled Marty's medical treatment. During an exchange between Ramsey and Tina for the jewels, two thugs hired by Jonas Chamberlain enter the penthouse. While Tina hides in another room, Ramsey is murdered by the two thugs, who are then shot and killed by John when he arrives on the scene. Seizing the opportunity, Tina flees the penthouse, distracting John from going upstairs and finding Marty. Later, Todd arrives, having followed Tina, and discovers Marty, who has been left with amnesia after the explosion in Ireland and has no idea who Todd is. Todd brings Marty to his new home, where he keeps her as his 'guest,' hiding the traumatized woman from her family and friends while telling her that she has no family or friends.

Marty has a photograph of herself with John, whom she feels a connection to, and when Marty asks about who the man in the picture is, Todd feeds Marty several lies, telling her that John is the man who left her to die. Todd begins to feed Marty a slanted, selective version of their shared history, claiming that they were friends in college, and colorfully embroidering the truth to claim that John stole his wife and family from him. When Marty pressures Todd for more information about the past, Todd tells Marty that she was gang raped in college, while not letting on that he was involved. Marty comes to rely on Todd as a caretaker during her slow rehabilitation, and finds herself growing close to the man he represents himself to be. Todd begins telling Marty that she is his only confidant during his estrangement from Blair and his daughter Starr. When Blair becomes suspicious of Todd "mystery woman" in his house, he claims that the unidentified woman is his new girlfriend and that their connection is "deeper than sex." Todd nonetheless allows himself to enjoy his and Marty's "friendship" while he deceives her. On August 18, 2008, Marty has a nightmare, in which she begins remembering her rape. Later that night, she dreams of John, who warns her that Todd is lying to her.

When Todd learns that his niece, Jessica, who has had a mental breakdown in the wake of her husband's death, is operating under an alternate personality "Tess", he's cornered into a stalemate where "Tess" threatens to reveal that he's hiding Marty if he reveals that Jessica has had a psychiatric meltdown. "Tess" then backed-up Todd's lies to the unsuspecting Marty.

Over time, Marty and Todd's relationship intensifies, and Marty begins to express romantic feelings for her "caretaker" On the outs with his family and increasingly delusional, Todd kisses Marty passionately then pulls away. Todd begins to fantasize about a "clean slate", free of all the "mistakes of the past". In a manic outburst, Todd offers Marty a shocking proposition: Run away with him, and raise his daughter's unborn child. Todd claims that his daughter, Starr, wants him to have her baby, when in reality Starr wants nothing to do with her father. Starr intends to give the baby up for adoption to Marcie McBain. Marty is shaken by Todd's request to run away and start a family with him, but, still unknowing of the truth, she agrees; however, when Marty continues to dream about John McBain and regains her ability to walk, Todd fears that his lies will be exposed. As Marty grows physically stronger, the unstable Todd grows eager to whisk Marty away to their "new life" before she can remember the truth. Meanwhile, John continues to investigate the "mystery woman" Blair told him about and begins to suspect that Marty may be alive and imprisoned by Todd.

Growing increasingly obsessed with the idea of "erasing their past", Todd describes himself as 'falling in love' with Marty and proposes marriage to her. Marty refuses, saying she needs to understand who she was before she can move forward into the future. But, when Marty accesses the internet on Todd's laptop and begins to research her past, Todd convinces her to abandon her search for her previous life, 'let go of the past', and move on with him. Marty's memories are stirred when she babysits Jessica's daughter Bree and flashes back to caring for an infant (her son, Cole). Marty pleads with Todd to help her understand what the strange images of a child mean, but Todd lies, insisting that Marty never had children and that she is thinking only of "the son she never had", further encouraging her to join him in raising his daughter's soon-to-be-stolen child.

When Starr goes into labor on October 31, 2008, Todd and Marty finalize their plans to leave Llanview forever, with Todd buying them a large home in New Mexico and making plans for Marty and he to marry. Todd also sends Marty's private nurse, con artist Lee Halpern, to assist in his plan to steal Starr's baby; Marty remains unaware of any wrongdoing. When Todd buys Marty a new wardrobe, she models his purchases and the situation culminates in Marty telling Todd that she's falling in love with him and wants make love. As things heat up, he flashes back to the night of the rape. Unaware of the true impact or significance of her words, or how Todd has manipulated her, Marty tells him that he is 'not the man he once was,' and that she is 'healed and new, not the woman she used to be.' She insists that all that matters in the present is their "love." And on November 6, 2008, Todd and the amnesiac and housebound Marty have "consensual" sexual intercourse.

After the act, Todd has second thoughts about stealing his daughter's newborn. Before rushing to the hospital, he tells Marty he will be back soon, leaving her to write in her new diary about her "passionate night" with Todd and their newfound "love." As Marty lies in her bed, John McBain comes crashing through her bedroom window on a rope. When John comes in, Todd appears in the doorway. Confronted with his lies, Todd has to confess everything that he did to Marty. Marty bitterly informs Todd that he has essentially raped her all over again. John beats Todd up and Todd is charged with kidnapping, unlawful restraint, and rape. Todd and Marty are taken to the hospital. While there, Cole sees Marty who she still doesn't recognize. He's the first to tell her that she had children and that he is her son. When alone with Nora, Marty angrily tells Nora that she "willingly" had sex with Todd but she is horrified by what has been done to her. Marty starts to feel nauseous at the thought of having had sex with the man who was the ringleader in her gang rape. Nora advises her to take the morning-after pill to prevent pregnancy due to her sexual encounter with Todd. She does, and later tells Todd with satisfaction.

In December 2008, Téa Delgado (Todd's former wife) returns to defend Todd in the subsequent rape trial, and this time Nora, Todd's lawyer from the college gang rape, is the prosecution. The rape charges, as well as the other charges, are dropped when in a scathing cross-examination Téa corners Marty into saying that, regardless of her mental state and diagnosable brain damage done to her in the car accident that caused her amnesia, Marty had invited Todd's "lovemaking".

Devastated when the rape and kidnapping charges are then dropped, an unraveling Marty sets a plan in motion; professing to still "love" Todd — who still delusively believes that even cognizant of their history that Marty could still "love" him — Marty lures Todd to a private New Year's celebration for two. On the roof of the Palace Hotel on January 2, 2009, she urges him to do the one thing that will make her happy: jump. Todd steps off the edge, and plummets into the water below. His ex-wife Blair drags him out of the river.

Later, Marty's other rapists, Powell Lord and Zach Rosen returned to town. During a series of events, Marty is recaptured by Powell who claims that he's 'helping her' and who blames Todd for having destroyed all of their lives. After Marty and Todd are rescued from Powell Lord, by John McBain, Marty finally remembers her past.

Marty and John finally get together, and she soon discovers that she is pregnant with John's child. However, John is having dreams about finding Natalie in his bed and Natalie's feelings for John resurface just as Marty and John learn they are having a baby. Tragedy strikes, however, when Marty suffers a miscarriage after being pushed down a flight of stairs by a mystery assailant, who is later revealed to be Eli Clarke. Shortly after, John leaves Marty for Natalie.

Several months later, Cole is led to believe that Eli Clarke has murdered Starr and their daughter Hope, which results in Cole shooting Eli, killing him. Marty tries to take the blame, but Natalie soon squanders that plan and Cole is sent to prison. It is discovered that Starr and Hope had escaped Eli, but then had been kidnapped by Hannah O'Connor, a troubled young woman whom Marty had taken in to keep the girl from being sent into foster care. Hannah had become obsessed with Cole and had kidnapped Starr in order to kill her so that she (Hannah) could have Cole all to herself, but James Ford managed to thwart her plans. Both shocked and furious that she had never noticed that Hannah wasn't getting any better, Marty disowns her, coldly informing Hannah that she is unfixable and that it was a mistake to ever trust her before she is dragged away by the police. Marty vows revenge against a now-pregnant Natalie, who claims the baby is John's. Meanwhile, Todd tricks Starr into signing a restraining order forbidding Marty any visitation to Hope, Marty's grandchild, leaving Marty even more devastated.

Marty becomes suspicious of Natalie's friendship with Jessica's fiance and John's friend, Brody Lovett and wonders if perhaps Natalie's unborn child is really Brody's — not John's. Upon obtaining a copy of Natalie's amnioplasty results, which claim that Brody is the father of Natalie's child, Marty uses it as an opportunity to exact her revenge. She confronts Natalie and attempts to blackmail her into springing Cole from jail, threatening to tell John about the DNA test if she does not. However, after discovering that John has proposed to Natalie, Marty seemingly promises not to do so, but in fact plans to tell Jessica at the ceremony and have her inform John. To this end, she crashes the ceremony, but her plan derails when Jessica is rushed to the hospital due to pregnancy complications. In the ensuing argument between herself and Natalie, Marty falls and strikes her head.

Natalie subsequently takes Marty to the Buchanan lodge, holding her at gunpoint and planning to leave her stranded at the lodge with no way to get help, and also to ensure that Marty loses her job as a psychologist after informing the cops that Marty stole her medical records. However, when Natalie's water breaks before she can leave, Marty turns the tables on her, turning a deaf ear to Natalie's pleas and departing, leaving the laboring Natalie alone with no way to send for help.

However, Marty has a pang of conscience and returns to help Natalie give birth. John tracks her and Marty to the lodge and walks in moments after Natalie has given birth to a baby boy. When Marty holds Natalie's baby, she suffers a complete nervous breakdown, believing it to be her and John's baby. At the hospital, it becomes clear to all that Marty is completely insane, as she is convinced that it was Natalie and not Eli who pushed her down the stairs. After bursting in on John and Natalie, sobbing that the baby is hers and that Natalie is trying to steal it, Marty is committed and sedated.

The truth about Natalie's baby eventually comes out, and a betrayed John calls off their engagement. As he begins dating Kelly Cramer, a seemingly recovered Marty is released from St. Anne's; soon after, she confesses to her psychiatrist, Dr. Buhari, that she switched Natalie's paternity test results — and that John is indeed the father of little Liam. However, instead of going to Natalie and John with the truth, Marty keeps it to herself in the hopes that she will be able to reconcile with John. Showing that she is still deranged, Marty threatens both Natalie and Kelly, prompting John to feign interest in a reconciliation with Marty just so he can keep an eye on her. In May 2011, Marty becomes even more unhinged and sees not only Natalie but Kelly as a threat to her reunion with John. When Marty arrives at John's to prepare him dinner, she has a confrontation with Kelly, who pick up a knife in defense. Off screen Marty stabs Kelly twice, who is later discovered bleeding in the bathroom by John.

Later, Natalie, having acquired Marty's session tape, confronts Marty on the roof of the Angels Square Hotel. After a brief struggle Marty ends up hanging on for dear life, saved by Natalie. Marty thanks Natalie for saving her life, but then pushes Natalie off of the roof. Natalie miraculously survives the fall and is discovered by John and Brody. When Brody goes to the roof searching for Marty, Marty knocks him out and leaves, taking Liam with her. Todd shares the news with Marty that her husband Patrick is still alive. He then takes her to the airport where he tells her that she's going to see her husband, but before Marty leaves she tells Todd that she forgot to tell John that Liam is his son. Marty gets Todd to promise that he will indeed tell John the truth, and afterwards Marty leaves town with Patrick on the plane.

== Reception and impact ==
Marty's impact on daytime television has been substantial. The 1993 gang rape storyline inspired feminist studies, and Haskell won the Daytime Emmy Award for Outstanding Supporting Actress in a Drama Series for the role in 1994. In 2009, she won for Outstanding Lead Actress in a Drama Series.

Though the rape storyline was well-received, it was also criticized. Opinions were given that it polarized "the gap between rapists and the raped". There was concern that the show departed from the rape paradigm by not only insisting the essential "goodness" of Powell Lord, who had also raped Marty, but that it implied peer pressure "could be an adequate (or even physiologically possible) excuse for rape". Analyst Mary Buhl Dutta reasoned the storyline invokes "rape myths" cataloged by scholar Martha R. Burt, such as "only bad girls get raped", "women ask for it", and "women 'cry rape' only when they've been jilted or have something to cover up". Burt said such myths "deny or reduce perceived injury, or ... blame the victims for their own victimization".

At the time of Haskell's return to the role in 2008, Marty was called "one of those tentpole characters [characters who hold enormous sway with viewers] that everyone who has watched One Life to Live at some point remembers".
