= Susan Haskell =

Canadian actress

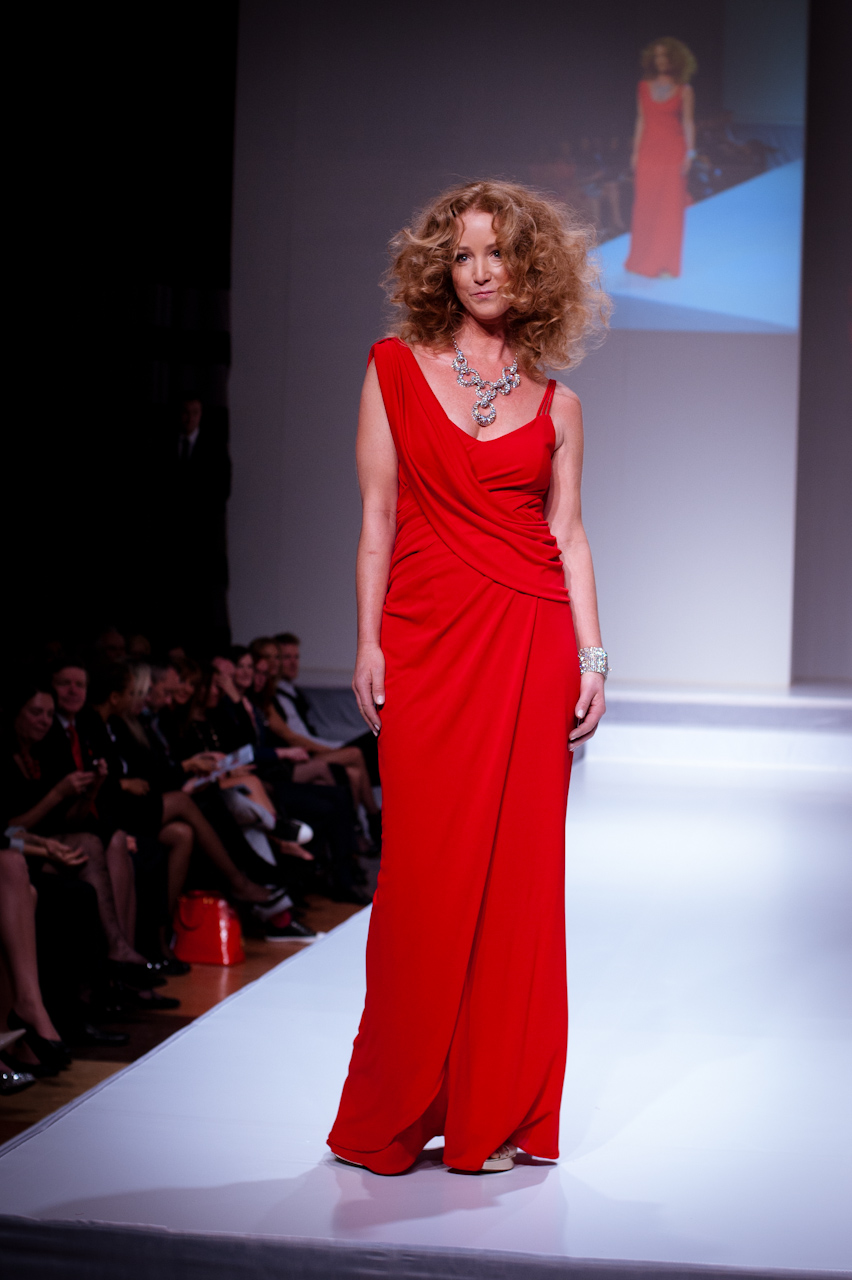
- Haskell in March 2012
- Born: June 10, 1963 (age 63); Toronto, Ontario, Canada
- Years active: 1992–2011
- Spouse: Thorsten Kaye
- Children: 2

Susan Haskell (born June 10, 1963) is a Canadian actress. She played the role of Marty Saybrooke on the ABC soap opera One Life to Live.

== Personal life ==
She graduated from the American Academy of Dramatic Arts in 1991.

Haskell also appeared on Port Charles in 2001 as Granya Thornhart, opposite her former One Life to Live love interest (and real-life husband), Thorsten Kaye, with whom she has two daughters McKenna (born February 2003) and Marlowe Marann (born January 28, 2007).

== Career ==
Haskell portrayed this role from December 1991 until August 1997, with two brief visits in January 2004 and January 2005. She returned again for an extended stay in mid-2008, first appearing onscreen on June 11, 2008. Haskell won two Daytime Emmy Awards, in 1994 for Outstanding Supporting Actress for the role in 1994, and in 2009 for Outstanding Lead Actress. At the time of Haskell's 2008 return, Marty was called "one of those tentpole characters that everyone who has watched One Life to Live at some point remembers." It was noted that the 1993 story of the character's gang rape led by Todd Manning "is one of the show's most remembered and impactful."

When Haskell was expecting her second child with Kaye, the role of Marty was recast in November 2006 with Christina Chambers. Chambers exited the show in November 2007, a year after her debut, and Haskell returned in mid-2008.

== Television & Film Credits ==
- The Pink Chiquitas as Pink Chiquita (1986)
- My Secret Identity as Lauren Vail (1990 episode, "Calendar Boy")
- Strictly Business as Donna (1991)
- One Life to Live as Dr. Margaret "Marty" Saybrooke (1992–1997, 2004, 2005, 2008–2011)
- Zoya as Elizabeth (1995)
- Mrs. Winterbourne as Patricia Winterbourne (1996)
- Sliders as Susannah Morehouse (1997 episode, "Oh Brother, Where Art Thou?")
- JAG as Lt. Cmdr. Jordan Parker (1998–2001) (recurring)
- Smart House as Natalie (1999)
- ER as Mrs. Burke (1999 episode, "Sins of the Fathers")
- 18 Wheels of Justice as Maryann Cates (2000-2001)
- Port Charles as Granya Thornhart (2001)
- The District as Karen Spotz (2001 episode, "Rage Against the Machine")
- No Turning Back as Helen Knight (2001)
- Dead By Monday as Karen (2001)
- Black Point as Natalie Travis (2002)
- When Angels Cry as Ghost (2002 short)
- Crossing Jordan as Jane Newman (2004 episode, "He Said, She Said")
- Guarding Eddy as Dr. Fields (2004)
- The Good Shepherd as Wife Dinner Guest (2006)
