= List of StarCraft media =

StarCraft is a science fiction media franchise made up of real-time strategy video games developed and published by Blizzard Entertainment. The series has several games which carry the main story arc: StarCraft, its expansion pack StarCraft: Brood War, and the trilogy StarCraft II. In addition, the series incorporates media that include spin-off video games, tabletop games, novelizations, graphic novels, and other literature. A variety of toys have also been produced. Set in the 26th century, the series revolves around three species fighting for dominance in a distant part of the Milky Way galaxy: the Terrans, humans exiled from Earth who are adept at conforming to any situation; the Zerg, a race of insectoids obsessed with the pursuit of genetic perfection through the assimilation of other races; and the Protoss, a humanoid species with advanced technology and psionic abilities attempting to preserve from the Zerg both their civilization and strict philosophical way of living.

Conceived by Chris Metzen and James Phinney, the StarCraft series has been a commercial and critical success. The first game, StarCraft, is regarded as being highly influential in the real-time strategy genre. Combined with its official expansion, Brood War, over 10 million copies of StarCraft have been sold globally. StarCraft remains one of the most popular online games in the world; Blizzard Entertainment reported an 800 percent increase in Battle.net service usage after the game's release in 1998. The original StarCraft and its expansion are particularly popular in South Korea, where a successful eSports scene has been established.

== Games ==
=== Video games ===
| Game | Release date | |
| Game | North America | PAL region |
|---|---|---|
| StarCraft | 31 March 1998 | 31 March 1998 |
Developed by Blizzard Entertainment, and released for Microsoft Windows; Set real-time strategy standards and established a successful electronic sports scene; particularly popular in South Korea; Ported to Mac OS in March 1999
| StarCraft: Insurrection | 31 July 1998 | 31 July 1998 |
Authorized add-on for StarCraft, developed by Aztech New Media; Side story based around a minor planet in the series' backstory
| StarCraft: Retribution | Late 1998 | Late 1998 |
Authorized add-on for StarCraft, developed by Stardock and published by WizardWorks; Side story set around the retrieval of a powerful and ancient artifact
| StarCraft: Brood War | 30 November 1998 | March 1999 |
Official expansion pack to StarCraft, developed by Blizzard Entertainment and Saffire and released for Microsoft Windows and Mac OS; Game events continue from directly after the original game; Enhanced the gameplay balance of StarCraft; is used as the base for electronic sports with StarCraft
| StarCraft 64 | 13 June 2000 | 16 June 2000 |
Nintendo 64 version of StarCraft and Brood War, ported by Mass Media Interactive Entertainment; Includes additional secret mission expanding on the character of Alexei Stukov
| StarCraft II: Wings of Liberty | July 27, 2010 | July 27, 2010 |
Developed by Blizzard Entertainment for Windows and Mac OS X; Continues story from four years after Brood War; Intended as a first part of trilogy, and the title will be focusing on the story of Terrans
| StarCraft II: Heart of the Swarm | March 12, 2013 | March 12, 2013 |
Developed by Blizzard Entertainment for Windows and Mac OS X; Intended as a second part of trilogy, and will be the title focusing on the story of Zerg
| StarCraft II: Legacy of the Void | November 10, 2015 | November 10, 2015 |
Being developed by Blizzard Entertainment for Windows and Mac OS X; Intended as a third part of trilogy, and will be the title focusing on the story of Protoss
| StarCraft: Ghost | Cancelled | Cancelled |
Stealth-action game developed by Blizzard Entertainment, previously by Nihilistic Software and Swingin' Ape Studios; Spin-off console title focusing on new character of Nova; Noted for lengthy development, considered vaporware; development on the game was cancelled

=== Other games ===
| Game | Release date | Media type |
|---|---|---|
| StarCraft Adventures | July 2000 | Role-playing game |
Tabletop game based on the Alternity game system
| StarCraft: The Board Game | October 2007 | Board game |
Tabletop game for two to six players, produced by Fantasy Flight Games; Winner of "Best Board Game" at the 2008 Origins Game Fair

== Soundtracks ==
| Title | Release date | Length | Label |
|---|---|---|---|
| StarCraft: Game Music Vol. 1 | January 2000 | 56:49 | Net Vision Entertainment |
Composed predominantly of tracks inspired by StarCraft and produced by South Korean DJs; a small number of original game tracks composed by Glenn Stafford, Derek Duke, Jason Hayes and Tracy W. Bush were included; Discontinued, previously sold through Blizzard Entertainment's online store
| StarCraft Original Soundtrack | 10 August 2008 | 63:34 | Azeroth Music |
Comprises tracks composed by Glen Stafford, Derek Duke, Jason Hayes and Tracy W. Bush for in-game themes and cut scenes; Released online through iTunes

== Printed media ==
| Title | Release date | ISBN | Media type |
|---|---|---|---|
| StarCraft: Revelations | 29 March 1999 | — | Short story |
Written by Chris Metzen and Sam Moore; published in Amazing Stories magazine; Accompanying artwork art by Samwise Didier featured on the cover of Amazing Stories
| StarCraft: Hybrid | Second quarter of 2000 | — | Short story |
Written by Micky Neilson and published in Amazing Stories magazine; Accompanied by artwork by Samwise Didier
| StarCraft: Uprising | 18 December 2000 | ISBN 978-0-7434-1898-0 | Novelization |
Written by Micky Neilson and published by Simon & Schuster, originally only available as an e-book; Prequel to StarCraft, focusing on the origins of Sarah Kerrigan
| StarCraft: Liberty's Crusade | 1 March 2001 | ISBN 978-0-671-04148-9 | Novelization |
Written by Jeff Grubb and published by Simon & Schuster; Adaptation of the first campaign in StarCraft
| StarCraft: Shadow of the Xel'Naga | 1 July 2001 | ISBN 978-0-671-04149-6 | Novelization |
Written by Gabriel Mesta and published by Simon & Schuster; Set between StarCraft and Brood War, focusing on the discovery of Xel'Naga artifacts
| StarCraft: Speed of Darkness | 1 June 2002 | ISBN 978-0-671-04150-2 | Novelization |
Written by Tracy Hickman and published by Simon & Schuster; Side story set in the first campaign in StarCraft, focusing on the lives of individual Confederate marines
| StarCraft: Queen of Blades | 1 June 2006 | ISBN 978-0-7434-7133-6 | Novelization |
Written by Aaron S. Rosenberg and published by Simon & Schuster; Adaptation of the second campaign in StarCraft
| StarCraft Ghost: Nova | 28 November 2006 | ISBN 978-0-7434-7134-3 | Novelization |
Written by Keith R.A. DeCandido and published by Simon & Schuster; Set during the first campaign in StarCraft, focuses on the origins of Nova
| StarCraft: The Dark Templar Saga #1: Firstborn | 22 May 2007 | ISBN 978-0-7434-7125-1 | Novelization |
Written by Christie Golden and published by Simon & Schuster; Prequel to StarCraft II, focusing on excavation of Xel'Naga artifacts and Protoss history
| The StarCraft Archive | 13 November 2007 | ISBN 978-1-4165-4929-1 | Anthology |
Collection of early StarCraft novels, published by Simon & Schuster; Consists of Uprising, Liberty's Crusade, Shadow of the Xel'Naga and Speed of Darkness
| StarCraft: The Dark Templar Saga #2: Shadow Hunters | 27 November 2007 | ISBN 978-1-4165-8003-4 | Novelization |
Written by Christie Golden and published by Simon & Schuster; Prequel to StarCraft II, continuation of storyline begun in Firstborn
| StarCraft: Frontline | August 2008 | ISBN 978-1-4278-0721-2 | Graphic novel |
Written by Richard A. Knaak and published by Tokyopop; An anthology of short stories set before StarCraft II exploring the viewpoints of the three main species
| StarCraft: I, Mengsk | 30 December 2008 | ISBN 978-1-4165-5083-9 | Novelization |
Written by Graham McNeill and published by Simon & Schuster; Focuses on the origins of characters in the Mengsk family: Angus Mengsk, Arcturus Mengsk and Valerian Mengsk
| StarCraft: The Dark Templar Saga #3: Twilight | 30 June 2009 | ISBN 978-0-7434-7129-9 | Novelization |
Written by Christie Golden and published by Simon & Schuster; Prequel to StarCraft II, concludes the story arc of The Dark Templar Saga
| StarCraft: Ghost Academy | 1 February 2010 | ISBN 978-1-4278-1612-2 | Graphic novel |
Written by Keith R.A. DeCandido with art by Fernando Heinz Furukawa and published by Tokyopop; David Gerrold authored Spanish version; Focuses on the training of Nova as an espionage agent; Two sequential volumes published in February 2010 and March 2011
| StarCraft Ghost: Spectres | 27 September 2011 | ASIN B01K1585DC | Novelization |
Written by Nate Kenyon and published by the Pocket Books division of Simon & Schuster; Sequel to StarCraft Ghost: Nova
| StarCraft: Evolution | 8 November 2016 | ISBN 978-0425284735 | Novelization |
Written by Timothy Zahn; Published by Del Rey; Audiobook narrated by Christopher Ryan Grant and published by Random House Audio
| Heaven's Devil's (Starcraft II #1) | 6 April 2010 | ISBN 9781416550846 | Novelization |
Written by William C. Dietz; Published by Gallery Books; Audiobook
| Devil's Due (Starcraft II #2) | 12 April 2011 | ISBN 9781416550853 | Novelization |
Written by Christie Golden; Published by Gallery; Audiobook
| Flashpoint (Starcraft II #3) | 6 November 2012 | ISBN 978-0425284735 | Novelization |
Written by Christie Golden; Published by Simon & Schuster; Audiobook

== Other media ==
| Title | Release date | Media type |
|---|---|---|
| StarCraft Battle Chest | 31 December 1999 | Video game compilation |
Compilation of StarCraft and Brood War for Windows and Mac OS, along with the official strategy guides by Prima Games for the two games
| StarCraft Cinematics DVD | First quarter of 2001 | Cinematic cut scene collection |
Collector's DVD containing high quality versions of the cut scenes used in StarCraft and Brood War, along with audio commentary and concept art
| Heroes of the Storm | 2 June 2015 | Video game |
Developed by Blizzard Entertainment for Windows and Mac OS X; The game features over 15 characters from the StarCraft universe as playable heroes, as well as two Starcraft-themed battlegrounds: Braxis Holdout and Warhead Junction.
