= StarCraft: Ghost =

Cancelled video game

- The StarCraft: Ghost logo
- Developers: Blizzard Entertainment; Nihilistic Software; Swingin' Ape Studios
- Designers: Jacob Stephens (Nihilistic Software); Dave Maldonado (Swingin' Ape Studios)
- Composers: Kevin Manthei; Inon Zur (additional music)
- Series: StarCraft
- Platforms: PlayStation 2, GameCube, Xbox
- Release: Cancelled
- Genres: Stealth, action
- Modes: Single-player, multiplayer

StarCraft: Ghost was a military science fiction stealth-action video game developed by Blizzard Entertainment. It was intended to be part of Blizzard's StarCraft series and was announced in 2002. It was to be developed by Nihilistic Software for the GameCube, Xbox, and PlayStation 2 video game consoles. After several delays, Nihilistic Software ceded development to Swingin' Ape Studios in 2004. In 2005, Blizzard announced plans for the GameCube version were canceled.

The continued delay of Ghost caused it to be labeled vaporware, and it was ranked fifth in Wired News' annual Vaporware Awards in 2005. Blizzard announced in 2006 that the game was put on "indefinite hold" while the company investigated seventh generation video game console possibilities. Subsequent public statements from company personnel had been contradictory about whether production was to be renewed or planned story elements worked into other products. In 2014, Blizzard president Mike Morhaime confirmed that Ghost had been canceled.

Unlike its real-time strategy predecessor StarCraft, Ghost was to be a third-person shooter, and intended to give players a closer and more personal view of the StarCraft universe. Following Nova, a Terran psychic espionage operative called a "ghost", the game would have been set four years after the conclusion of StarCraft: Brood War and cover a conspiracy about a secretive military project conducted by Nova's superiors in the imperial Terran Dominion. Very little of the game's storyline has been released; however, in 2006 a novel was published called StarCraft Ghost: Nova, which covers the backstory of the central character.

== Gameplay ==
=== Campaign ===
A screenshot of the game in 2005 just prior to its postponement. Nova is shown engaging a group of Terran guards in a firefight.

During StarCraft: Ghost's gameplay, the player's character Nova used stealth and darkness to reach objectives and remain undetected. Nova had a cloaking device that allowed for temporary concealment, but certain hostile non-player characters could overcome this with special devices and abilities. Nova was also equipped with thermal imaging goggles and a special EMP device for disabling electronic devices and vehicles. In addition to the focus on stealth elements, StarCraft: Ghost included a complex combat system. Blizzard planned to include a small arsenal of weaponry with assault and sniper rifles, grenades, shotguns, and flamethrowers. Nova could engage in hand-to-hand combat and used these skills to eliminate enemy threats quietly. If alerted, enemy characters would hunt for the player, set up traps, and fire blindly to nullify Nova's cloaking device.

Nova was agile, acrobatic, and able to perform maneuvers such as mantling and climbing ledges, hanging from pipes, and sliding down ziplines. The player had access to Nova's psionic powers honed through training as a ghost agent, such as the ability to improve her speed and reflexes drastically. StarCraft: Ghost included many of the vehicle units featured in StarCraft and StarCraft: Brood War. Some vehicles, such as space battlecruisers and starfighters, only played support roles, while others, such as hoverbikes, scout cars, and futuristic siege tanks, could be piloted.

=== Multiplayer ===
The multiplayer mode in StarCraft: Ghost differed from the stealth-based mechanics of the single-player portion. It aimed to give players a personal view of the battles from the real-time strategy games of the series. Accordingly, Ghost's multiplayer was structured around class-based team gameplay and fighting in a variety of game modes. Ghost incorporated traditional game modes from multiplayer video games such as deathmatch, capture the flag, and king of the hill, but also introduced two game modes specifically designed for the StarCraft universe. The first was "Mobile Conflict", which required two teams to fight for control of a single Terran military factory with the ability of atmospheric flight. Using vehicles and team tactics, both teams were required to first board the structure and then capture its control room to fly it to the team's starting point. The structure was then landed and had to be defended from capture by the opposing team for a set amount of time.

The second mode was "Invasion", in which two teams fought for control of mineral resource nodes. Whenever teams captured a node they gained points that could be used to purchase classes and vehicles. In all of the team-based game modes, teams had access to four Terran unit classes: light infantry, marine, firebat, and ghost. The light infantry class had minimal armor but a larger range of weapons, while the marine was a heavily armored soldier with an assault rifle and grenades. The firebat was a heavy marine armed with a flamethrower and napalm rockets. Finally, the ghost was a variation of Nova's character in the single-player mode, equipped with a cloaking device, thermal vision, EMP device, and sniper rifle, but lacked the speed ability. Due to the size of the armor worn by marines and firebats, only ghosts and light infantry could pilot vehicles.

== Plot ==
Ghost took place in the fictional universe of the StarCraft series. The series is set in a distant part of the galaxy called the Koprulu Sector and begins in the year 2499. Terran exiles from Earth are governed by a totalitarian empire, the Terran Dominion, that is opposed by several smaller rebel groups. Two alien races discover humanity: the insectoid Zerg, who begin to invade planets controlled by the Terrans; and the Protoss, an enigmatic race with strong psionic power that attempt to eradicate the Zerg. Ghost took place four years after the conclusion of StarCraft: Brood War, in which the Zerg become the dominant power in the sector and leave both the Protoss and the Dominion in ruins. The game followed the story of Nova, a young ghost agent—a human espionage operative with psychic abilities—in the employ of the Dominion.

Nova, the game's protagonist, appears in a cinematic from Ghost. The cinematics were designed to be of higher quality than those in previous StarCraft titles.

Although the game was canceled, the backstory for Nova was released in the novel StarCraft Ghost: Nova by Keith R. A. DeCandido. It was meant to accompany the game's release, but was published in 2006 after development halted. In the novel, Nova is a fifteen-year-old girl and daughter to one of the ruling families of the Confederacy of Man, an oppressive government featured in StarCraft. The Confederacy is overthrown by rebels, who go on to form the Dominion. Nova has significant psionic potential, but has been kept out of the Confederate ghost operative training program because of her father's influence. After her family is murdered by rebels, Nova loses control of her mental abilities and accidentally kills 300 people around her home. She flees from her home before she is caught, and is later forced to work for an organized crime boss as an enforcer and executioner. She is rescued by a Confederate agent who is investigating her disappearance during a rebel attack on the Confederate capital that leads to the Confederacy's destruction. Nova is consequently acquired by the newly formed Terran Dominion, who erase her memory and train her as a ghost agent.

Few details have been revealed about Ghost's plot beyond Nova's backstory. Under emperor Arcturus Mengsk, the Terran Dominion has rebuilt much of its former strength and controls a new military formed to counter the Zerg. To further bolster the effectiveness of his military, Mengsk initiates a secret research operation codenamed Project: Shadow Blade and places it under the command of his right-hand man, General Horace Warfield. In the program, an experimental and potentially lethal gas called terrazine is used to enhance the genetic structure of the Dominion's psychic ghost agents. The process is described as changing the agents into "shadowy superhuman beings bent on executing the will of their true master". It is into the midst of this that Nova finishes her training and is dispatched in operations against the Koprulu Liberation Front, a rebel group that challenges Mengsk's empire. However, Nova's mission leads her to uncover a conspiracy that involves Shadow Blade. This revelation causes her to question her loyalty to the Dominion and could upset the balance of power within the galaxy.

== Development and cancellation ==
On September 20, 2002, Blizzard Entertainment announced the development of StarCraft: Ghost in conjunction with fellow video game company Nihilistic Software. Nihilistic aimed to release the game for the Xbox, PlayStation 2, and GameCube video game consoles in late 2003, which elicited positive reactions from the press. The game was consistently delayed, and during the third quarter of 2004, Nihilistic discontinued their work on the project. Blizzard stated that Nihilistic had completed the tasks it had been contracted for, and the game would be delivered on time.

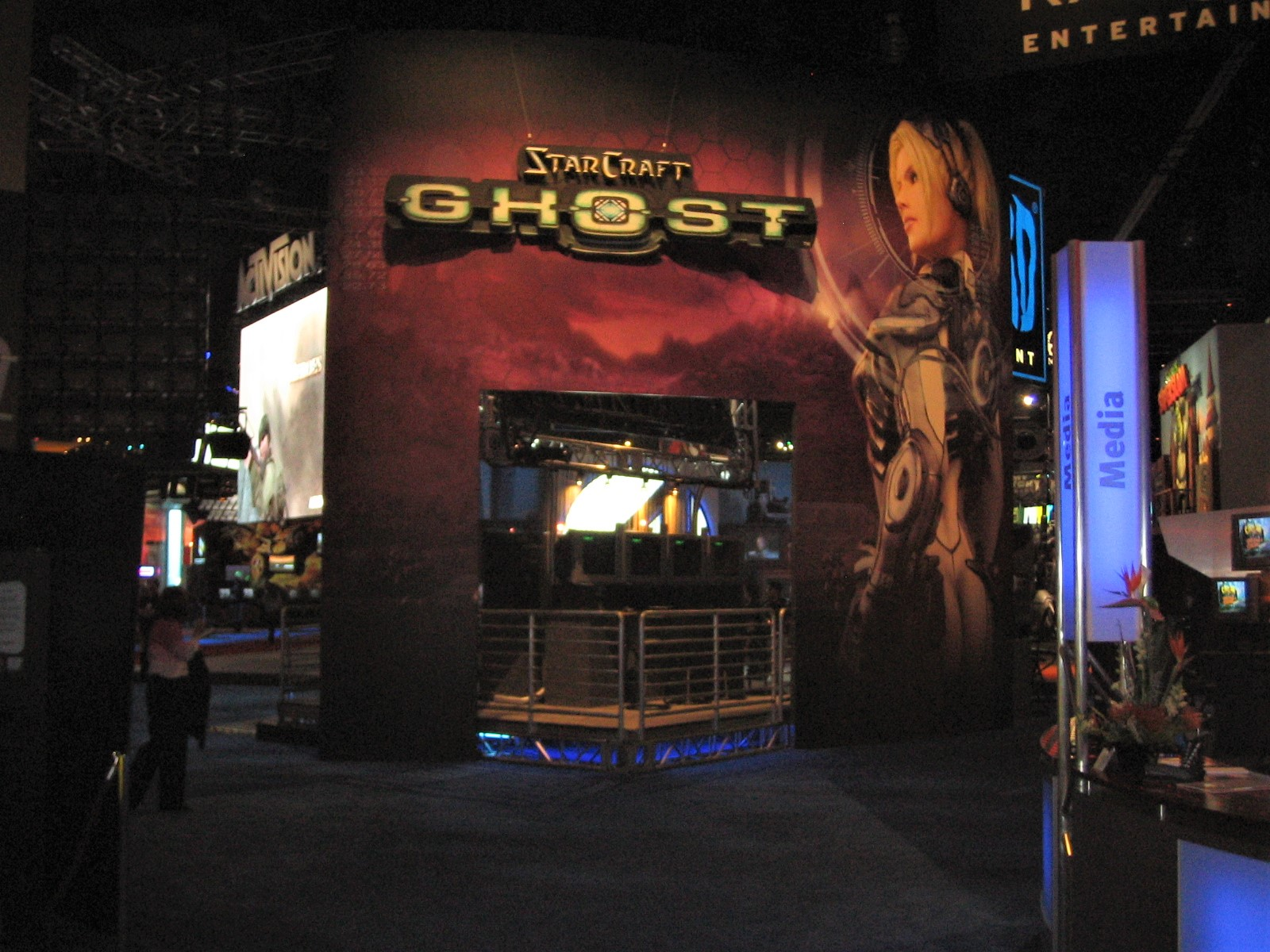
StarCraft: Ghost at the Electronic Entertainment Expo in 2005

In July 2004, Blizzard Entertainment began collaboration with Swingin' Ape Studios to work on the game, and bought the company in May 2005. Despite anticipation for the game by industry journalists, Ghost was delayed again and its release date was pushed back to September 2005. At Electronic Entertainment Expo 2005, Ghost was officially reannounced, but the GameCube version was canceled by Swingin' Ape Studios due to the platform's lack of online support. The game's release on the remaining two platforms was again delayed until 2006. Despite the efforts of Swingin' Ape, Ghost failed to materialize as scheduled, and in March 2006 Blizzard Entertainment announced an indefinite postponement on development of Ghost while the company explored new options with the emerging seventh generation of video game consoles. Despite its long development history, IGN noted that the concept of Ghost still held promise. Although the game's development was suspended, Keith R. A. DeCandido's novel StarCraft Ghost: Nova was published several months later in November 2006.

Complementing Nihilistic's and Swingin' Ape Studio's work on the game, Blizzard's cinematics team—originally formed to develop StarCraft's cut scenes—created the cut scenes for Ghost's single-player campaign, which are integral to the game's storyline. The team, which originally consisted of six people, grew to 25, and used newer hardware, software, and cinematics techniques to create higher quality cut scenes than those featured in StarCraft and Brood War. The game's trailer, composed of the cinematics team's work, was released in August 2005.

Since Ghost's production halted, Blizzard Entertainment has sporadically released information about the title. The game's protagonist, Nova, shows up in one campaign mission of StarCraft II: Wings of Liberty, in which players are given the option to side with her or fight against her forces. She also features in StarCraft II: Heart of the Swarm, as well her own campaign in StarCraft II: Nova Covert Ops. Metzen further stated that he believed Ghost had an excellent storyline that may be told in future novels following from DeCandido's Nova. In June 2007, Rob Pardo, one of the lead developers at Blizzard Entertainment, indicated that there still was interest in finishing Ghost. Later in an interview, Pardo stated that Blizzard had been "stubborn" in persevering with Ghost, but they "were not able to execute [the game] at the level we wanted to". Blizzard's president Mike Morhaime and Pardo gave a presentation on the company's history at the D.I.C.E. Summit in February 2008. During the presentation, they listed games canceled by Blizzard, which did not include Ghost. When questioned about this, Blizzard's co-founder Frank Pearce explained that the title was never "technically canceled" and that it was not in the company's focus at the time due to a finite amount of development resources. Morhaime later elaborated that it was the sudden success of World of Warcraft and the concurrent development of StarCraft II that consumed Blizzard's resources, leading to Ghost being put on hold. Despite Blizzard's announcements, many of the video games industry's journalists now list Ghost as canceled and consider it vaporware; the game was ranked fifth in the 2005 edition of Wired News' annual Vaporware Awards.

On September 23, 2014 in an interview with Polygon about the cancellation of Blizzard's next generation MMO Titan, Mike Morhaime confirmed that StarCraft: Ghost was also cancelled. Morhaime said, "It was hard when we canceled Warcraft Adventures. It was hard when we canceled StarCraft: Ghost, but it has always resulted in better-quality work." In a July 2016 Polygon article, it was suggested that when the game's production halted the main reasons it was shelved were because the game worked on the PlayStation 2 and Xbox, but it was scheduled to be released in 2005 when the Xbox 360 was about to be released, and it would take a lot of resources to move from the previous console generation to the current generation as well as Blizzard having a lot of success with its then recently released PC-only game World of Warcraft.

== Leak ==
In January 2020, videos appearing to be from the Xbox version of the cancelled game started appearing online. On February 16, 2020, numerous videos showing different missions, areas, and gameplay were uploaded to the web. Reports of the Xbox development version game files leaking to the public started to emerge. Journalists at gaming publications such as Kotaku verified the legitimacy of the code that began to disseminate online. Throughout the day, infringement notices were issued to channels hosting footage of the game on YouTube, resulting in many videos being removed. Eventually the files widely disseminated online through filesharing methods such as public torrent trackers. This was the second time a playable, albeit unfinished and rough, version of a cancelled Blizzard game has leaked online, with Warcraft Adventures: Lord of the Clans being leaked online in September 2016.

== See also ==
- Warcraft Adventures: Lord of the Clans, another cancelled Blizzard project
