= StarCraft =

Military science fiction media franchise

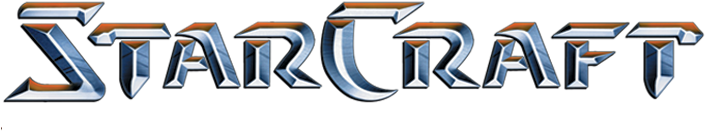
- Series logo prior to upcoming title
- Genres: Real-time strategy Action-adventure (StarCraft 2030)
- Developer: Blizzard Entertainment
- Publisher: Blizzard Entertainment
- Creators: Chris Metzen; James Phinney
- Platforms: Windows; Classic Mac OS; macOS; Nintendo 64
- First release: StarCraft; March 31, 1998
- Latest release: StarCraft: Remastered; August 14, 2017

StarCraft is a military science fiction media franchise created by Chris Metzen and James Phinney and owned by Blizzard Entertainment. The series, set in the beginning of the 26th century, centers on a galactic struggle for dominance among four species—the adaptable and mobile Terrans, the ever-evolving insectoid Zerg, the powerful and enigmatic Protoss, and the godlike Xel'Naga creator race—in a distant part of the Milky Way galaxy known as the Koprulu Sector. The series debuted with the video game StarCraft in 1998. It has grown to include a number of other games as well as eight novelizations, two Amazing Stories articles, a board game and other licensed merchandise, such as collectible statues and toys.

Blizzard Entertainment began planning StarCraft in 1995 with a development team led by Metzen and Phinney. The game debuted at the 1996 Electronic Entertainment Expo and used a modified Warcraft II game engine. StarCraft also marked the creation of Blizzard Entertainment's film department; the game introduced high quality cinematics integral to the storyline of the series. Most of the original development team for StarCraft returned to work on the game's expansion pack, Brood War; that game's development began only shortly after StarCraft was released. In 2001, StarCraft: Ghost began development under Nihilistic Software. Unlike the previous real-time strategy games in the series, Ghost was to be a stealth-action game. After three years of development, work on the game was postponed in 2004. Development of a true RTS sequel, StarCraft II: Wings of Liberty, began in 2003; the game was announced in May 2007 and was released in July 2010. StarCraft II continued with the StarCraft II: Heart of the Swarm expansion, which was released in March 2013. The third and final StarCraft II installment, Legacy of the Void, was released in November 2015. In 2016, a single-player nine-mission pack, Nova Covert Ops, was released in form of DLC.

The original game and its expansion have been praised as one of the benchmark real-time strategy games of its time. The series has gathered a solid following around the world, particularly in South Korea, where professional players and teams participate in matches, earn sponsorships, and compete in televised matches. By June 2007, StarCraft and Brood War had sold nearly 10 million copies combined. StarCraft II: Wings of Liberty and its sequels obtained similar praise, and also sold very well. By the end of 2017, the franchise's lifetime revenue totaled over $1 billion. In addition, the series was awarded a star on the Walk of Game in 2006, and holds four Guinness World Records in the Guinness World Records Gamer's Edition of 2008.

On March 27, 2017, Blizzard announced StarCraft: Remastered, a remastered version of the original StarCraft, with the core updates being up-to-date graphics and revised dialogue and audio. As of 2017, the original StarCraft, its Brood War expansion, and StarCraft II: Wings of Liberty are free to download and play from Blizzard's website.

== Premise ==
=== Backstory ===
The story focuses on the activities of three species in a part of the Milky Way known as the Koprulu Sector. Millennia before any of the events of the games, a species known as the Xel'Naga genetically engineered the Protoss and later the Zerg in attempts to create pure beings. These experiments backfire and the Xel'Naga are largely destroyed by the Zerg. Centuries before the beginning of StarCraft in 2499, the hardline international government of Earth, the United Earth Directorate (UED), commissions a colonization program as part of a solution to overpopulation. On the way, the computers automating the colony ships malfunction, propelling the Terran colonists far off course to the edge of Protoss space. Seemingly out of contact with Earth, they form various factions to maintain their interests. Intrigued by the behavior and mentality of the Terrans, the Protoss remain hidden to examine the humans, while protecting them from other threats without their knowledge. The Zerg, however, target the Terrans for assimilation to harness their psionic potential, forcing the Protoss to destroy tainted Terran colonies to contain the Zerg infestation.

=== StarCraft ===
StarCraft begins days after the first of these attacks, where the predominant Terran government, the Terran Confederacy, falls into a state of panic as it comes under attack by both the Zerg and the Protoss, in addition to increasing rebel activity led by Arcturus Mengsk against its rule. The Confederacy eventually succumbs to Mengsk's rebels when they use Confederate technology to lure the Zerg into attacking the Confederate capital, Tarsonis. In the consequent power vacuum, Mengsk crowns himself emperor of a new Terran Dominion. During the assault on Tarsonis, Mengsk sacrifices his second-in-command, Sarah Kerrigan to the Zerg. This betrayal prompts one of Mengsk's commanders, Jim Raynor, to desert him with a small army. Having retreated with Kerrigan to their primary hive clusters, the Zerg are assaulted by Protoss forces commanded by Tassadar and the Dark Templar Zeratul. Through assassinating a Zerg cerebrate, Zeratul inadvertently allows the Overmind to learn the location of the Protoss homeworld, Aiur. The Overmind quickly launches an invasion to consume and assimilate the Protoss. Pursued by his own people as a heretic for working with the Dark Templar, Tassadar returns to Aiur and, with the assistance of Raynor and the templar Fenix, launches an attack on the Overmind and ultimately sacrifices himself to kill the creature.

=== Brood War ===
Cinematic cut scenes like this scene from Brood War are used at key plot points during the single-player campaigns of the StarCraft series.

In Brood War, the Protoss are led by Zeratul and Artanis. They begin to evacuate the surviving population of Aiur to the dark templar homeworld of Shakuras under a fragile alliance between the two untrusting branches of the Protoss. On Shakuras, they are misled by Kerrigan into attacking the Zerg to advance Kerrigan's quest to securing power over the Zerg. This deception comes after she reveals that a new Overmind has entered incubation. Meanwhile, Earth decides to take action in the sector, sending a fleet to conquer the Terran Dominion and capture the new Overmind. Although successfully taking the Dominion capital Korhal and enslaving the Overmind, the UED's efforts to capture Mengsk are thwarted by a double agent working for Kerrigan, Samir Duran. Kerrigan, allying with Mengsk, Fenix, and Raynor, launches a campaign against the UED, recapturing Korhal. She turns against her allies, with Fenix and Duke both perishing in the ensuing attacks. Kerrigan later extorts Zeratul into killing the new Overmind, giving her full control over the entire Zerg Swarm. After defeating a retaliatory attack by the Protoss, Dominion, and the UED (consequently destroying the last of the UED fleet), Kerrigan and her Zerg broods become the dominant power in the sector. However, Zeratul secretly uncovers a plot by Duran to create Protoss-Zerg hybrids and learns that Duran is a servant of not Kerrigan, but a "far greater power".

=== Wings of Liberty ===
Four years later, in Wings of Liberty, Kerrigan and the Zerg vanish from the Koprulu Sector, allowing the Protoss to once again take on a passive role in the galaxy. Meanwhile, Raynor forms a revolutionary group named Raynor's Raiders in order to overthrow Mengsk. On Mar Sara, Raynor liberates the local population from Dominion control and also discovers a component of a mysterious Xel'Naga artifact. The Zerg reappear and overrun Mar Sara, forcing Raynor to arrange an evacuation to his battlecruiser, the Hyperion. The Raiders embark on a series of missions to undermine Mengsk, stop frequent Zerg infestations on Terran worlds, gather psychic individuals for military assets, and find the remaining pieces of the Xel'Naga artifact, which they sell to the enigmatic Moebius Foundation in order to fund their revolution. Soon after, Zeratul delivers a psychic crystal that allows Raynor to share visions involving an ominous prophecy where Zerg-Protoss hybrids and an enslaved Zerg swarm wipe out the Terrans and the Protoss. The vision reveals that only Kerrigan has the power to prevent the eradication of all life in the sector and beyond. After collecting more artifact pieces, the Raiders forge an alliance with Valerian Mengsk, Arcturus' son, who is their secret benefactor from Moebius Foundation. After recovering the final artifact piece, Valerian and Raynor work together to invade the Zerg world of Char and use the artifact to restore Kerrigan's humanity, thus weakening the Zerg at the cost of much of the Dominion fleet. An agent of Arcturus makes an attempt on Kerrigan's life, and Raynor defends her and takes her in for medical examination.

=== Heart of the Swarm ===
In Heart of the Swarm, the Dominion discovers where Raynor and Kerrigan are hiding and launch an attack on them. Kerrigan manages to escape, but is cut off from Raynor and upon hearing news that he was captured and executed, she returns to Zerg territory to retake control of the swarm and exact revenge on Mengsk. During her quest, she has an encounter with Zeratul, who advises her to travel to Zerus, the original homeworld of the Zerg, where she regains her powers as the Queen of Blades, returning stronger than ever, and learns that a fallen Xel'Naga named Amon was responsible for making the Zerg what they are: a warring swarm, bound to a single overriding will. After confronting a legion of servants of Amon, including a breed of Protoss-Zerg hybrids, Mengsk informs Kerrigan that Raynor is still alive and uses him as a leverage against her, keeping the location where he is imprisoned a secret, until she joins forces with the Hyperion to locate and rescue him. Seeing that she discarded her humanity after all the effort he took to restore it, Raynor rejects her, despite her confession that she loves him, and parts ways with her. Kerrigan turns her attention to Korhal and sends her forces to bring down Mengsk once and for all. During their showdown, Mengsk uses the artifact to immobilize her, but Raynor appears to protect her, and Mengsk is ultimately killed by Kerrigan. With the Dominion under control of Mengsk's son Valerian, Kerrigan bids farewell to Raynor and departs with the Zerg Swarm to confront Amon and his forces.

=== Legacy of the Void ===
In Legacy of the Void, Zeratul invades a Terran installation under control of Amon in order to pinpoint the exact location of his resurrection, taking advantage of a sudden attack by Kerrigan and the Zerg swarm. He then departs to an ancient Xel'Naga temple where he has a vision of Tassadar, who prompts him to claim the artifact in possession of the Terrans. Zeratul returns to warn Artanis of Amon's return, but he decides to proceed with his plans of leading his army to reclaim Aiur as Hierarch. Amon awakens on Aiur and takes control of the majority of the Protoss race through the Khala, the telepathic bond that unites all emotions for the Khalai faction of the Protoss. Only Zeratul and the Nerazim, the Dark Templar, are immune due to their lack of connection to the Khala. The Nerazim proceed to save as many Khalai as they can by severing their nerve cords, which connect them to the Khala, with Zeratul sacrificing himself to save Artanis in the occasion. After escaping the planet with an ancient vessel, the Spear of Adun, Artanis reclaims the artifact as Zeratul suggested and gathers allies among the many Protoss tribes scattered across the galaxy in order to remake his army and launch another assault on Aiur. Using the artifact, Artanis' forces restrain Amon's essence, time enough for the other Khalai Protoss who were still under his control to sever their nerve cords and banish Amon to the Void.

In a short epilogue after the end of Legacy of the Void, Kerrigan calls for Artanis and Raynor's help to confront Amon inside the Void to defeat him once and for all. In the occasion, they meet Ouros, the last of the Xel'Naga who reveals that to confront Amon on equal terms, Kerrigan must inherit Ouros' essence and become a Xel'Naga herself, as Ouros himself is at the last of his strength. Assisted by the Zerg, Terran and Protoss forces, the empowered Kerrigan vanquishes Amon, before disappearing without a trace. Two years later, Kerrigan appears before Raynor in human form and he departs with her to never be heard from again.

=== Nova Covert Ops ===
Nova Covert Ops takes place after the events of Legacy of the Void. Nova Terra awakens in a facility operated by the Defenders of Man with her recent memories erased. She is initially accused of carrying out attacks against the Terran Dominion. After escaping, she returns to Dominion service under Emperor Valerian Mengsk and begins investigating the Defenders, eventually discovering that they have been using psi-emitters to lure feral Zerg into attacks on civilian worlds in order to portray Valerian's government as incompetent and incapable of protecting its population. Nova subsequently makes an agreement with the Tal'darim highlord Alarak, obtaining terrazine that allows her to recover her missing memories. She learns that the Defenders had previously captured and manipulated her into assisting their operations, and identifies their leader as General Carolina Davis, a loyalist of the previous regime under Arcturus Mengsk. Valerian uses Nova's evidence to expose Davis publicly and has her arrested, but the Tal'darim attack the Dominion during the confrontation after Alarak decides to take revenge on the Defenders of Man himself. Nova and Dominion forces repel the attack, though Davis escapes in the confusion. Nova pursues her to a Dominion shipyard, where Davis takes control of the experimental Xanthos war machine. Although Valerian orders Nova to capture Davis alive for trial, Nova concludes that she remains too dangerous and kills her. Having deliberately disobeyed the Emperor's orders, Nova leaves Dominion service and absconds with the crew of the Griffin, although Valerian elects not to pursue her immediately.

== Games ==
Release timeline
1998	StarCraft
1998	StarCraft: Insurrection
1998	StarCraft: Brood War
1998	StarCraft: Retribution
1999
2000	StarCraft 64
2001–2009
2010	StarCraft II: Wings of Liberty
2011–2012
2013	StarCraft II: Heart of the Swarm
2014
2015	StarCraft II: Legacy of the Void
2016	StarCraft II: Nova Covert Ops
2017	StarCraft: Remastered

The StarCraft series includes a core set of titles that carry the main storyline. These games were released in chronological order, with each new title following on from the events that are depicted in the previous title. A full second game, StarCraft II: Wings of Liberty, was released in 2010, taking place four years after the end of Brood War. Two expansions, Heart of the Swarm and Legacy of the Void (both currently stand alone games), were planned from the beginning; the former was released in 2013 and the latter was released in 2015.

All the games in the main series prior to 2030 reboot are real-time strategy games, where the player views the events as a military commander for each of the three species. In addition, two spin-off titles have been released; these are authorized expansion packs to the original that focus on other characters and settings based at the same time as the main storyline. Like the main series, these two titles are also real-time strategy games. A spin-off, StarCraft: Ghost, which was to be a third person action-stealth game, was in development, but was later cancelled.

=== StarCraft ===
StarCraft, released for Windows on March 31, 1998, is the first video game in the StarCraft series. A science fiction real-time strategy game, StarCraft is set in a distant sector of the Milky Way galaxy. A Mac OS version of the game was released by Blizzard Entertainment in March 1999. A Nintendo 64 port including StarCraft, Brood War, and a new secret mission "Resurrection IV" was released in the United States on June 13, 2000.

The game's story revolves around the appearance of two alien races in Terran space and each race's attempts to survive and adapt over the others. The player assumes three roles through the course of the three campaigns: a Confederate colonial governor who becomes a revolutionary commander, a Zerg cerebrate pushing forward the species' doctrine of assimilation, and a Protoss fleet executor tasked with defending the Protoss from the Zerg. StarCraft soon gained critical acclaim, winning numerous awards, including being labelled "the best real-time strategy game ever made" and being ranked the seventh best game of all time by IGN in both 2003 and 2005, and the eleventh best game in 2007.

StarCraft: Brood War is the official expansion pack for StarCraft, developed by Blizzard Entertainment and Saffire. Released for Windows and Mac OS in the United States on December 18, 1998, the expansion directly continues the events of StarCraft. The expansion's story continues only days after the conclusion of the original game. It starts with the Protoss' struggle to ensure the survival of their species and continues with the intervention of the United Earth Directorate into local Terran affairs. The livelihood of both the Protoss and the previously silent Earth government is then threatened by the ever-increasing power of Sarah Kerrigan and her Zerg broods. In addition, the expansion introduces new features and improvements. A total of seven new units with different functions and abilities are included, the artificial intelligence behavior was modified, new graphical tilesets for terrain were added, and the game's level editor received improved scripting tools to facilitate cut scenes with the in-game engine. The expansion received critical praise for fixing various balance issues with the original game, development attention on par with that of a full game, and for continuing with single player campaigns that were heavily story-driven. In April 2017, Starcraft received its first update in over eight years, and Brood War was released for free to both PC and Mac.

A remastered edition of the game, StarCraft: Remastered, released August 14, 2017, preserves the gameplay of the original while adding support for ultra-high-definition graphics, Blizzard's modern online features, and re-recorded audio (soundtrack and sound effects). On July 10, 2019, Blizzard released StarCraft: Cartooned, a graphics overhaul pack for the game by Carbot Animations, the producers of multiple Blizzard-related parody animations, including their first and longest-running one, the StarCrafts series. As a graphical overhaul, its effect applies to all game modes and menus in StarCraft: Remastered.

A port of the StarCraft and StarCraft: Brood War campaigns was released in 2011 as a fan-made mod for StarCraft II under the name StarCraft: Mass Recall. The mod includes the original units, campaigns, and hidden missions, but uses the StarCraft II engine including the AI mechanics, which makes the game notably more difficult than the original. It was completed in 2019 and has since received minor technical updates.

=== StarCraft II ===
StarCraft II: Wings of Liberty is the official sequel to StarCraft released for Windows and Mac OS X by Blizzard Entertainment on July 27, 2010. The game was announced at the Worldwide Invitational in South Korea on May 19, 2007, with a pre-rendered cinematic cut scene trailer and a gameplay demonstration of the Protoss. Further demonstrations regarding the game's new features have been showcased at subsequent BlizzCons and other games conventions. The game incorporates a new 3D graphics engine and adds new features such as the Havok physics engine. StarCraft II also incorporates DirectX 10 level effects in Windows.

Originally envisioned as a single game, StarCraft II was split into three parts during development, one for focusing on each race. The base game, Wings of Liberty, follows the Terrans, while two expansion packs, Heart of the Swarm and Legacy of the Void, have been released to complement Wings of Liberty and further the story from the views of the Zerg and Protoss, respectively. The story of Wings of Liberty continues from four years after the conclusion of Brood War and revolves around Jim Raynor's struggles against the Terran Dominion.

StarCraft II: Heart of the Swarm is an expansion pack to StarCraft II: Wings of Liberty and was released on March 12, 2013. It is part two of the StarCraft II trilogy. The expansion includes additional units and multiplayer changes from Wings of Liberty, as well as a continuing campaign focusing on Kerrigan and the Zerg race. It spans 27 missions (20 main missions and 7 side missions).

The saga of StarCraft is ultimately completed with StarCraft II: Legacy of the Void, which was released on November 10, 2015. StarCraft II: Legacy of the Void is a stand-alone game in which new units are added to all three races as well as changing existing units, and also makes groundbreaking changes to the economy-aspect of the game. The story of StarCraft is concluded by following the Protoss Race in their quest to reclaim their homeworld and for Kerrigan to ultimately slay the greatest threat to the entire universe. The game is divided into a 3-mission prologue, a 19-mission main story campaign, and a 3-mission epilogue that wraps everything up.

At BlizzCon 2015, during the "Future of StarCraft II" presentation, it was revealed that Blizzard will release additional mission packs to keep players engaged with StarCraft II. The first pack is called Nova Covert Ops, and will center around the character Nova. The mission pack consists of three episodes, with a total of nine new missions. It did not require the purchase of StarCraft II and could be played with the Starter Edition. The release date for the first episode is March 29, 2016. At the same time, Blizzard has announced that new commanders are planned to be added to the co-op mode in Legacy of the Void as a DLC, with Karax to be the first addition given for free.

=== StarCraft (2030) ===
At BlizzCon 2026 on September 12, a narrative-driven open-world StarCraft shooter title was announced.

=== Spin-off titles ===
The success of StarCraft spurred the release of two authorized add-on titles to StarCraft, as well as at least one failed attempt at a deviation into a genre other than real-time strategy.

==== Insurrection ====
Insurrection was the first add-on pack released for StarCraft. Although developed and published by Aztech New Media, it is authorized by Blizzard Entertainment. It was released for the PC on July 31, 1998. The expansion's story focuses on a Confederate colony during the course of the first campaign of StarCraft. As in StarCraft, the player takes control of each race in three separate campaigns. In the first campaign, Terran colonists attempt to defend themselves from the Zerg invasion of the sector as well as from a rising insurgency. The second campaign has the player directing a Protoss task force sent to clear the Zerg infestation of the colony by any means necessary. In the final campaign, the player assumes the role of a Zerg cerebrate, whose goal is to crush all opposition on the surface. The expansion contains 30 new campaign missions and over 100 new multiplayer maps, although it does not include new content in the form of units and graphical terrain tilesets. Insurrection was criticized by reviewers for lacking the quality of the original game, and is not widely available. Although the add-on is authorized by Blizzard Entertainment, they offer no comment on support or availability of the game.

==== Retribution ====
Retribution is the second of the two authorized add-on packs released for StarCraft. The add-on was developed by Stardock and published by WizardWorks. It was released for the PC in late 1998. The game is set during the second campaign in StarCraft, revolving around the acquisition of a crystal of immense power connected to the Xel'Naga. Divided into three campaigns, the game has the player assuming the roles of a Protoss fleet executor, the commander of a Dominion task force, and a Zerg cerebrate, all tasked with retrieving the crystal from a Dominion colony and getting it off the planet as quickly as possible. As with its predecessor, Retribution does not include any new gameplay features beyond its single player campaigns and an abundance of multiplayer levels. The add-on was not well received by reviewers, and instead it was regarded as "average", but at least challenging. Retribution is similarly not widely available, and Blizzard Entertainment offers no comment regarding support or the availability of the add-on despite authorizing it.

==== Ghost ====
StarCraft: Ghost was intended to be a tactical stealth game for video game consoles developed under the supervision of Blizzard Entertainment. Announced in 2002, the game was constantly delayed due to various issues, including a change of development team from Nihilistic Software to Swingin' Ape Studios in July 2004. As updates about the development of the game became less frequent, and the graphics and game mechanics became more outdated, suspicion began to grow that Blizzard would cancel the game. Finally, on March 24, 2006, Blizzard indefinitely postponed the game's development. The story of the game is about Nova, a Ghost agent of the Terran Dominion. Frequently used as an example of development hell, in 2008, Blizzard Entertainment refused to list the game as cancelled. It was not until August 23, 2014, in an interview with Polygon, that Chris Metzen confirmed that StarCraft: Ghost was indeed cancelled.

==== Ares ====
A FPS game based on StarCraft codenamed Ares was cancelled in summer 2019, with Blizzard focused on diverting resources towards Overwatch 2 and Diablo IV. Jason Schreier wrote in his 2024 book Play Nice: The Rise, Fall, and Future of Blizzard Entertainment that Activision Blizzard CEO Bobby Kotick disliked Ares for adapting the gameplay of the Battlefield series, which Activision executives viewed as inferior to their Call of Duty franchise.

== Development ==
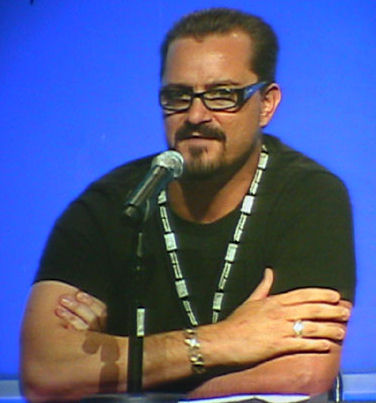
Chris Metzen, along with James Phinney, led the design of StarCraft and created the series' fictional universe.

Blizzard Entertainment began planning development on StarCraft in 1995, shortly after the beginning of development for Diablo. The development was led by Chris Metzen and James Phinney, who also created the game's fictional universe. Using the Warcraft II: Tides of Darkness game engine as a base, StarCraft made its debut at E3 1996. The game's success led to the development of two authorized add-ons, which were both released in 1998. However, neither of the two add-ons were particularly well received by critics. StarCraft also marked the debut of Blizzard Entertainment's film department. Previously, cinematic cut scenes were seen as simply gap fillers that often deviated from the game, but with StarCraft and later Brood War introducing high quality cinematics integral to the storyline of the series, Blizzard Entertainment is cited as having changed this perception and became one of the first game companies to raise the standard regarding such cut scenes.

After the release of the first two add-on packs, Blizzard Entertainment announced the official expansion pack to StarCraft, entitled Brood War. Most of the team at Blizzard Entertainment responsible for StarCraft returned to work on Brood War. Development on Brood War began shortly after StarCraft's release, and Blizzard Entertainment were assisted by members of Saffire, who were contracted for a variety of tasks consisting of programming and design for levels, visuals and audio effects.

In 2001, StarCraft: Ghost began development under Nihilistic Software, with the aim of releasing the game for the Xbox, PlayStation 2, and GameCube during late 2003. Unlike previous real-time strategy StarCraft titles, Ghost was to be a tactical third-person action game. Although the press was positive about the video game console direction taken by Ghost, the game was consistently delayed, and during the third quarter of 2004, Nihilistic Software discontinued their work with the project. Blizzard stated that Nihilistic Software had completed the tasks it had been contracted for and that the game would be delivered on time. The game was never released, although footage purported to be from the game was leaked online in 2021 before being taken down due to a request by Blizzard.

StarCraft II was announced on May 19, 2007, nearly a decade after the original, at the Blizzard Worldwide Invitational in Seoul, South Korea. StarCraft II was being developed, under the codename Medusa, for concurrent release on Windows XP, Windows Vista and Mac OS X. Blizzard announced a release date for July 27, 2010. Development on the game began in 2003, shortly after Warcraft III: The Frozen Throne was released.

A new installment in the series was revealed to be in development in September 2024, reportedly being managed by a small team within Blizzard that was mostly laid off after the cancelation of their Odyssey survivial game and Microsoft's acquisition of Activision Blizzard. The first-person shooter was already being developed for three years by that point. Around the same time, rumors surfaced of another game being helmed by Korean developer Nexon, one of four companies that had competed for publishing rights of the StarCraft IP, though Blizzard declined to comment on this alleged project. A first look at the new installment, an open-world shooter simply titled StarCraft slated for a 2030 release, was presented at BlizzCon 2026 on September 12, 2026.

== Music ==
The soundtrack for the original StarCraft was provided by Glenn Stafford, Jason Hayes, and Tracey W. Bush. The soundtrack for StarCraft II was provided by Derek Duke, Glenn Stafford, Neal Acree, and Russell Brower.

Brower, Blizzard's Director of Audio, has suggested that the music of StarCraft serves two functions: the music heard during gameplay is designed to be unobtrusive in order to allow the player to focus, with only the music that attaches to the cinematic interludes permitted to become more distinctive. Brower has also pointed out that certain musical themes in StarCraft II become associated with certain characters, a technique borrowed from composers such as John Williams and Richard Wagner.

=== StarCraft ===
Brower has said that most of the music for the original StarCraft series was produced on keyboards.

=== StarCraft II ===
The original material for the Wings of Liberty soundtrack spans approximately four hours. Brower has said in interviews that his team was consciously seeking a film-score feel for StarCraft II. In a short commentary provided for Blizzard, he recounted that the orchestral music for StarCraft II: Wings of Liberty was performed by 78 members of the San Francisco Symphony and Opera and recorded at the Skywalker stage at the Lucasfilm Ranch in Marin County, California, under the name "Skywalker Symphony Orchestra", conducted by Eímear Noone. Brower also recalled the use of a 32-voice choir in Seattle, Washington. Both these recording sessions were mixed by John Kurlander, who had previously worked on Peter Jackson's The Lord of the Rings and the Beatles' Abbey Road.

The Terran country and blues pieces were recorded at Dreamland studio in Woodstock, New York, and performed by members of Peter Gabriel's band, including bassist Tony Levin and drummer Jerry Marotta. Remaining pieces were recorded at the Blizzard studios, performed by musicians such as Laurence Juber (formerly of Wings) and Tommy Morgan. The soundtrack also contains John Bacchus Dykes and William Whiting's hymn Eternal Father, Strong to Save (1860).

The orchestral music for Heart of the Swarm was likewise recorded in Marin County, again with the services of Kurlander and Noone, with 80 performers from the Skywalker Symphony Orchestra.

Brower stated in an interview in 2013 that he intended to continue the process of associative musical themes in Legacy of the Void.

== Adaptations and other media ==
=== Novelizations ===
The StarCraft Archive cover

The StarCraft series is supported by at least 12 novelizations and an anthology, all published by Simon & Schuster, two short stories, and two graphic novels. At BlizzCon 2007, Chris Metzen stated that he hoped to novelize the entirety of StarCraft and Brood War into a definitive text-based story. The first novel, StarCraft: Uprising, was written by Micky Neilson, a Blizzard Entertainment employee, and originally released only as an e-book in December 2000. The novel follows the origins of the character Sarah Kerrigan. The second novel, entitled StarCraft: Liberty's Crusade, serves as an adaptation of the first campaign of StarCraft, following on a journalist following a number of the key Terran characters in the series. Written by Jeff Grubb and published in March 2001, it was the first StarCraft novel to be released in paperback. StarCraft: Shadow of the Xel'Naga, published in July 2001 is the third novel, written by Kevin Anderson under the pseudonym Gabriel Mesta. It serves as a link between StarCraft and Brood War. The fantasy author Tracy Hickman was brought in to write the fourth novel, StarCraft: Speed of Darkness, which was published in June 2002. Speed of Darkness is written from the viewpoint of a Confederate marine during the early stages of StarCraft. The first four novels, including the e-book Uprising, were later re-released as a single anthology entitled The StarCraft Archive in November 2007.

A fifth novel entitled StarCraft: Queen of Blades was published in June 2006. Written by Aaron S. Rosenberg, it is a novelization of the second campaign in StarCraft from the perspective of Jim Raynor. This was followed in November 2006 by StarCraft Ghost: Nova, a book focusing on the early origins of the character of Nova from the postponed StarCraft: Ghost game. Written by Keith R.A. DeCandido, the novel was meant to accompany the release of StarCraft: Ghost, but was continued despite the postponement of the game. In 2007 Christie Golden, an author whose previous work included novels in Blizzard's Warcraft series, was brought in to write a trilogy entitled the StarCraft: The Dark Templar Saga. The trilogy acts as a link between StarCraft and its sequel StarCraft II. The first installment, Firstborn being published in May 2007 and Shadow Hunters, the second novel, being published in November 2007. The final part of the trilogy, Twilight was released in June 2009. I, Mengsk was published in 2009, written by Graham McNeill, which focuses on the origins of the characters in the Mengsk family. In January 2010 Keith R.A. DeCandido and David Gerrold authored the StarCraft: Ghost Academy to elaborate the training of Nova as an espionage agent and in September 2011, Simon & Schuster published the StarCraft Ghost: Spectres as a sequel to the novel StarCraft Ghost: Nova. Timothy Zahn released Starcraft: Evolution in 2016.

In addition to these, Blizzard Entertainment authorized two short stories in Amazing Stories magazine, entitled StarCraft: Revelations and StarCraft: Hybrid. Revelations was authored by series creator Chris Metzen and Sam Moore, a Blizzard employee, and was featured on the cover of the 1999 spring edition with art by Blizzard's art director Samwise Didier. Hybrid was written by Micky Neilson and again was accompanied by artwork by Didier; the short story was published in the spring edition of 2000. At New York Comic-Con in 2008, TokyoPop announced that they would be producing a number of StarCraft graphic novels. Two series were announced: StarCraft: Frontline, which is a series of short story anthologies that spanned four volumes, and StarCraft: Ghost Academy, which was written by Keith R.A. DeCandido and follows several characters, such as Nova, during their training as the psychic assassins called "ghosts". There was a Starcraft graphic novel released in 2010, produced by Wildstorm and DC Comics, which features outlaws working on a last job, the assassination of Jim Raynor.

=== Merchandise ===
A number of action figures and collectable statues based upon the characters and units in StarCraft have been produced by ToyCom. A number of model kits, made by Academy Hobby Model Kits, were also produced, displaying 1/30 scale versions of the marine and the hydralisk. In addition, Blizzard Entertainment teamed up with Fantasy Flight Games to create a board game based in the StarCraft universe. Blizzard Entertainment also licensed Wizards of the Coast to produce an Alternity based game entitled StarCraft Adventures.

=== Heroes of the Storm ===
In 2015, Blizzard released Heroes of the Storm, a crossover multiplayer online battle arena video game in which players can control over 15 characters from the StarCraft universe as playable heroes, such as Artanis, Kerrigan, Nova, Raynor, and Zeratul. The game features two StarCraft-themed battlegrounds, Braxis Holdout and Warhead Junction. Various soundtracks from StarCraft, such as Terran and Zerg Theme, are present as background music in the game. Heroes of the Storm originated as a custom map called "Blizzard DOTA", as a part of the arcade feature for StarCraft II: Wings of Liberty.

== Reception and cultural impact ==
Aggregate review scores As of June 28, 2026.
Game	GameRankings	Metacritic
StarCraft	(PC) 93% (N64) 77%	(PC) 88 (N64) 80
Insurrection	48%	—
Retribution	—	—
StarCraft: Brood War	95%	—
StarCraft II: Wings of Liberty	92%	93
StarCraft II: Heart of the Swarm	86%	86
StarCraft II: Legacy of the Void	88%	88
StarCraft II: Nova Covert Ops - Mission Pack 1	—	73
StarCraft II: Nova Covert Ops - Mission Pack 2	—	—
StarCraft II: Nova Covert Ops - Mission Pack 3	—	—

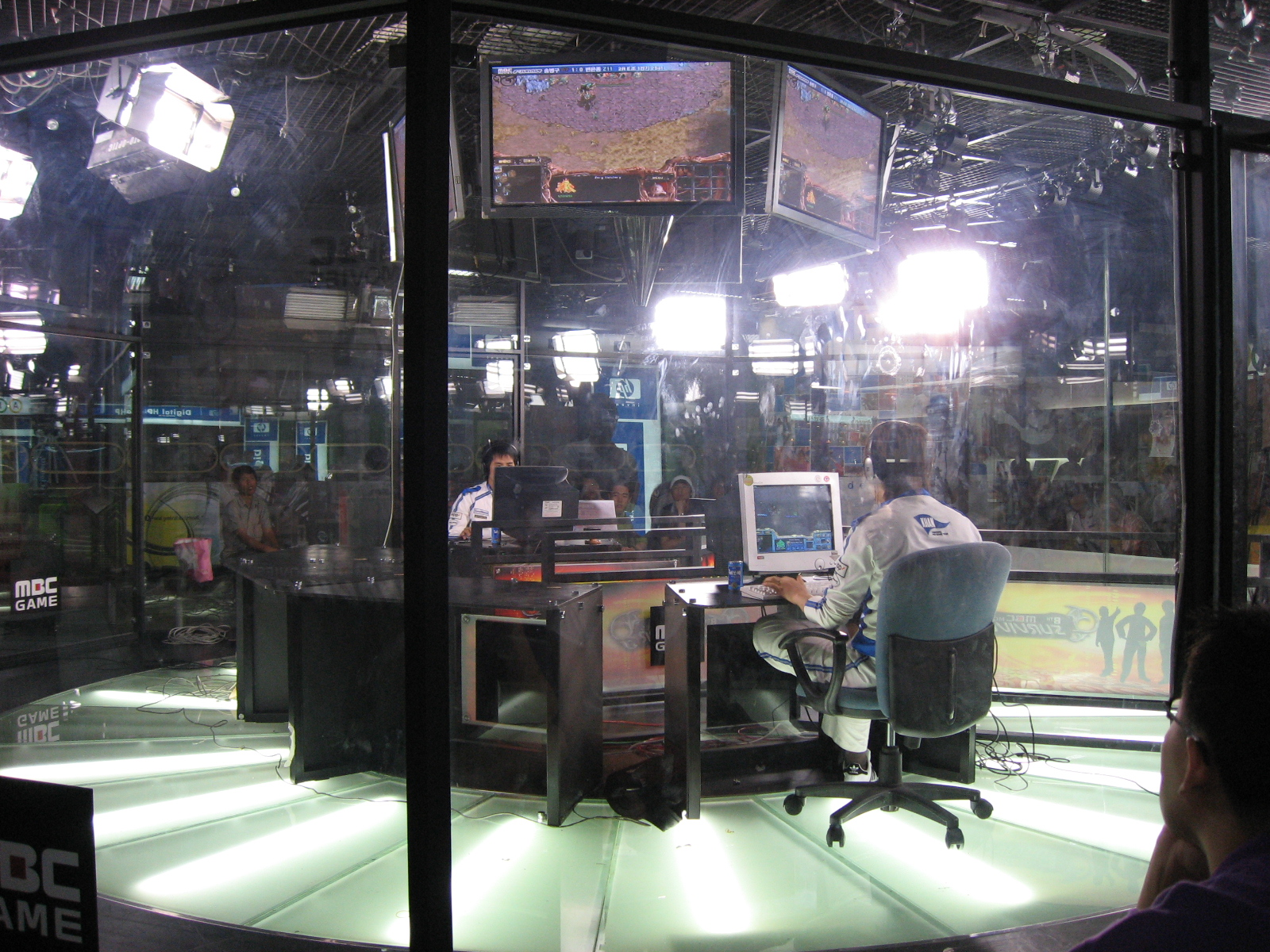
A StarCraft match in South Korea, televised by MBCGame

The StarCraft series has been a commercial success. After its release, StarCraft became the best-selling PC game for that year, selling over 1.5 million copies worldwide. In the next decade, StarCraft sold over 9.5 million copies across the globe, with 4.5 million of these being sold in South Korea. Since the initial release of StarCraft, Blizzard Entertainment reported that its Battle.net online multiplayer service grew by 800 percent. StarCraft remained one of the most popular online games in the world ten years after its release. After its release, StarCraft rapidly grew in popularity in South Korea, establishing a successful pro-gaming scene. Pro-gamers in South Korea are niche media celebrities and StarCraft games broadcast over three television channels dedicated to gaming. StarCraft has won numerous Game of the Year awards, is often described as one of the best real-time strategy games made, and is widely credited with popularizing the use of distinct and unique sides—as opposed to sides of equal ability and strength—in real-time strategy games.

Although Insurrection and Retribution were not particularly well received, StarCraft: Brood War generally received very positive reviews, with an aggregate GameRankings score of 95.00%. The magazine PC Zone gave Brood War a short but flattering review, describing it as having "definitely been worth the wait" and also drew note to the cinematic cut scenes, stating that they "actually feel like part of the story rather than an afterthought." IGN stated that Brood War's enhancements were "enough to enrich the core gameplay without losing the flavor" while GameSpot noted that the expansion was developed with the same level of care as the full game.

In 1999, Next Generation listed Warcraft and Starcraft as number 32 on their "Top 50 Games of All Time", commenting that, "StarCraft took it all a step further, with an innovative campaign structure and fantastic game balance for endless hours of multiplayer fun."

The release of StarCraft II: Wings of Liberty performed very well commercially and critically, selling 1.8 million copies within the first forty eight hours of release, which breaks the record of best selling strategy game in the history of the gaming industry. It received very positive reviews with an aggregate GameRankings score of 93%, and was nominated as the "Best PC Game of 2010" on GameSpot. By the end of 2012, Wings of Liberty had sold more than six million copies. This success continued with the release of the first expansion pack, StarCraft II: Heart of the Swarm, which had a GameRankings aggregate score of 86%. The standalone expansion pack sold 1.1 million copies within the first two days of its release on March 12, 2013, and was the best-selling PC game in that quarter. StarCraft II: Legacy of the Void, the third expansion pack, was similarly well received, having a GameRankings aggregate score of 88% while selling more than one million copies worldwide within the first day of its release.

Since the release of StarCraft II, a number of tournaments have been hosted in Korea and elsewhere, such as the GOMTV Global StarCraft II League (GSL).

In December 2018, an artificial intelligence system by Google's DeepMind (called "AlphaStar") beat professional players in StarCraft II for the first time.

=== Sales ===
The series sold over 17.6 million copies of games and expansions by the end of 2015. The first game (including Brood War) sold 11 million copies by 2009, making it the best selling PC strategy game of all time. By the end of 2017, the franchise had grossed over $1 billion in total revenue.

=== Analysis ===
The StarCraft series' faction system has been subject to scientific modelling and academic study. In 2013, Wired reported that researchers Thomas Targett and Duncan Forgan used data from 500 professional StarCraft II matches and statistical models to test which of the game's three races would prevail over time. The study treated Zerg, Terran, and Protoss strategies as inputs in a Monte Carlo simulation, ultimately finding only a slight advantage for Terran early-pressure strategies over Zerg and Protoss rivals.

== Legal issues ==
In May 1998, Blizzard Entertainment filed a lawsuit against Microstar Software for release and selling an unauthorized add-on to the original StarCraft entitled Stellar Forces. Blizzard argued that since the product was unauthorized and created using StarCraft's level editing software, it was a breach of the end user license agreement. In November 1998, Blizzard Entertainment won the court case against Microstar Software. In the settlement, Microstar agreed to pay an undisclosed amount in punitive damages and to destroy all remaining copies of Stellar Forces in its possession, as well as to formally apologize to Blizzard Entertainment.
