= StarCraft: The Board Game =

2007 board game

- Designers: Christian T. Petersen; Corey Konieczka
- Publishers: Fantasy Flight Games
- Players: 2 to 6
- Setup time: 30 minutes
- Playing time: 2 to 4 hours
- Chance: Low

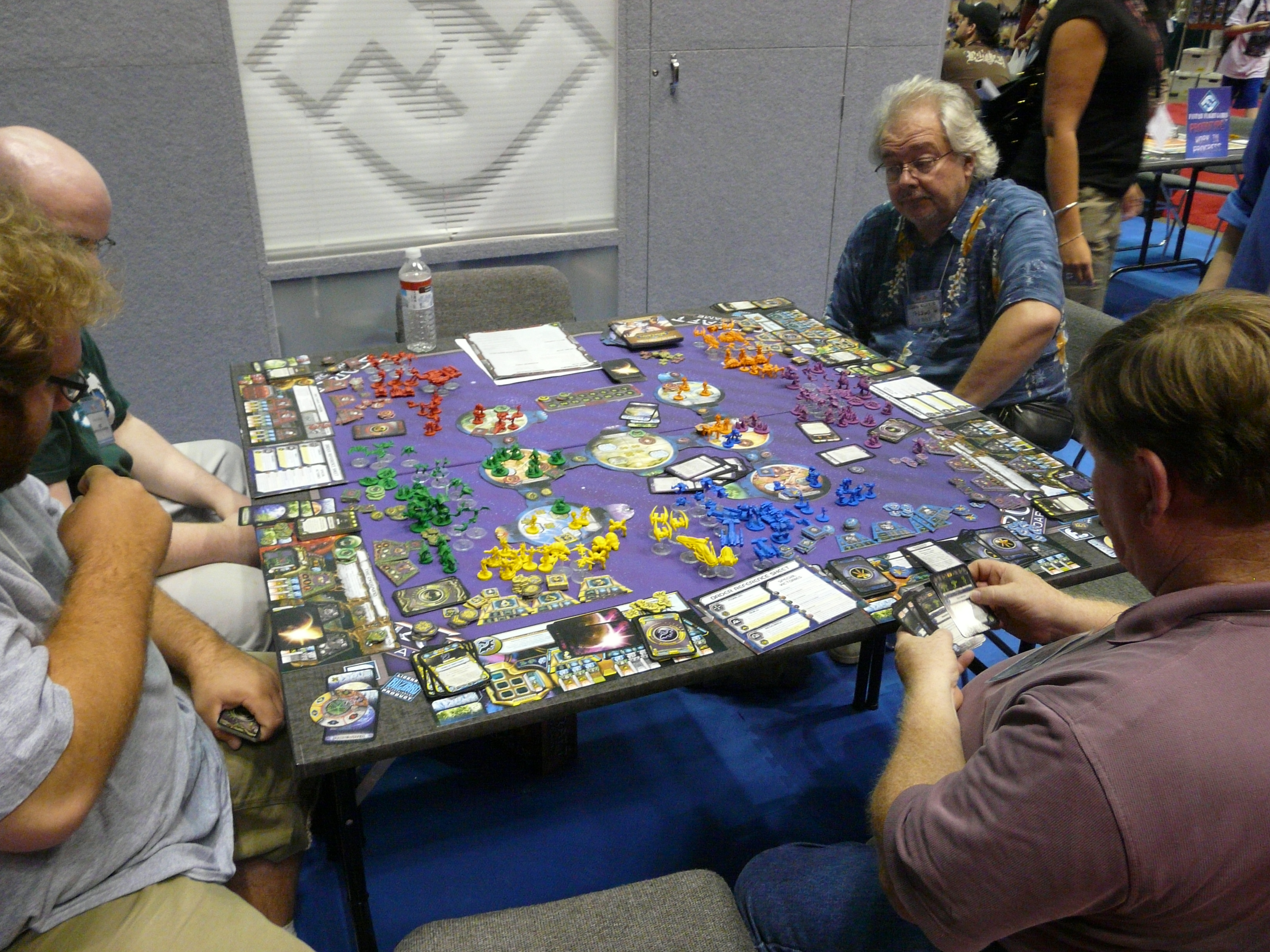
A game of StarCraft: The Board Game at Gen Con Indy 2008

StarCraft: The Board Game, published by Fantasy Flight Games, is a game inspired by the 1998 computer game StarCraft. Players take control of the three distinctive races featured in the video games, the Terrans, the Protoss, or the Zerg, to engage in battle across multiple worlds in order to achieve victory. Each of the three races features a fairly different playing style. A prototype of the game was shown at BlizzCon 2007, with pre-release copies sold at Gen Con 2007 and Penny Arcade Expo 2007. It was publicly released in October 2007.

== Gameplay ==
Up to six players may play StarCraft: The Board Game. Players take on the roles of one of two major factions of each of StarCraft's three races: the Terran Dominion led by Arcturus Mengsk, Raynor's Raiders led by Jim Raynor, the Protoss Conclave led by Aldaris, the Protoss loyal to Tassadar, the Zerg Overmind, or Sarah Kerrigan, Queen of Blades. Each of the six factions is unique in their starting equipment, and each faction has a unique victory objective, though the Terran factions are more alike with each other (the same with the other races).

At the start of the game, each player claims two of the game's 12 planets as their "home planet" (a 13th planet, Typhon, was given away as a promotion in 2008), and players take turns to build the game board, representing the Koprulu sector, using the planets by linking them up. Each player may then use Z-axis connectors to connect distant planets on the game board to each other, mimicking a 3-dimensional environment, with the planets connected this way representing planets vertically aligned or in proximity. Each planet may have up to four territories, which may generate minerals, Vespene gas, or Conquest Points. At the start of the game, each player has a base on one of their own home planets, with a small detachment of forces at their disposal.

Each turn consists of three phases: the Planning Phase, the Execution Phase, and the Regrouping Phase. In the Planning Phase, players take turns placing four of their Order tokens face-down on any planet where they have forces present (note, since the Orders are placed this way, the Orders placed latest are resolved first); these tokens are resolved in the Execution Phase. Game adjustments, including scoring, occur in the Regrouping Phase. There are three types of Orders that may be allocated:

- The Build Order allows Resources to be spent on the purchase of workers (which gather Resources), transports (which allow movement of troops between planets), buildings (increasing the variety of units that may be purchased by the players), modules (upgrades for bases), bases (providing a place for units to deploy), and units. Units (all units from the video games, with the exception of the Infested Terran and Broodling, are represented in StarCraft: The Board Game) are generally associated with the building that they are trained in the video game (or, for Zerg players, the building that allows them to be spawned in the video game).
- The Research Order allows players to spend Resources to add Technology Cards to their Combat Card Deck. Each player has separate Technology and Combat Card Decks, though players with the same race have identical decks. Combat and Technology Cards are used in combat.
- The Mobilise Order allows troops to be moved to the planet where the Order was issued. Troops may be moved from other regions on the same planet, or from adjacent planets. Each area of the board has a limited capacity of units, and the capacity may only be exceeded if a player intends to attack the particular area. Only one attack may be made per order.

With the proper buildings, advanced versions of these Orders may be issued, which have additional side effects.

During the Planning Phase, a stack of tokens would have been built for each planet. Orders are resolved during the Execution Phase, starting from the top of a stack, with players taking turns resolving their own Orders. Note that a player may choose to take an Event Card in lieu of following a particular Order, and must do so if they cannot execute any of their remaining Orders due to their Orders being unavailable.

Finally, in the Regrouping Phase, bases are removed from the board and Resource Cards are adjusted as needed. Each player also gains Conquest Points for any area under their control, and discards Combat Cards from their hand until they meet their hand limit (eight cards for Terran factions, six for the others). At the end of each turn, each player discards their accumulated Event Cards, and optionally having one of them take effect (the exception is "The End is Near" Event Cards, which are always resolved).

=== Combat ===
Combat is conducted by the use of the Mobilise Order. In combat, each attacking unit is paired with a defending unit in a skirmish; if the sides are unequal, the excess are assigned to supporting a primary attacker or defender in a skirmish (certain units, however, are always supporters, and cannot be a primary attacker or defender unless all other units on the same side are supporters). After skirmishes are determined, each player must play a Combat Card from their hand face down, with (optionally) a Reinforcement Card, a special type of Combat Card, for each skirmish. A player may also choose to place a Combat Card from the top of their Combat Card Deck in lieu of placing a card from their hand, though in exchange they may not play a Reinforcement Card.

Combat Cards provide the base Strength and Health values for a unit, which is enhanced by supporters, effects on Combat and Reinforcement Cards, and other effects. When both attacker and defender have placed their cards face-down, they are simultaneously revealed, with the attacker choosing which skirmish to be revealed and played out first, (and any Reinforcement Cards without Combat Cards, which may occur if a player places a card from their Combat Card Deck, are discarded and replaced with Combat Cards), and the Strength and Health values of the units are compared. If the Strength value of the primary unit matches or exceeds the Health of the value of the opposing primary unit, the opposing unit is destroyed. Note that, as in the video game, combat outcomes is subject to the type of the unit involved: for example, certain ground units may be unable to attack air units, in which case the unit may not lend its support if it is unable to attack the opponent's primary unit. Similarly, supporting units may be destroyed in place of the primary unit if the opposing primary unit is unable to target the player's own primary unit.

Certain units are also given various combat-related capabilities: for example, units with a Cloaking ability retreat instead of being destroyed, unless in the presence of a unit with a Detector ability. After all skirmishes are resolved, and if any defenders remain, the attackers must retreat their units to another territory. If the attackers are victorious, they claim control of the contested territory, and, during the Regrouping Phase, destroy the defeated player's base and take the territory's Resource Card (if any) from the defeated player.

=== Resources ===
Like the video game, there are two primary Resources in StarCraft: The Board Game: minerals and Vespene gas. To spend Resources, workers must be sent to harvest them. Each player has a "permanent supply" that cannot be affected by other players, and players may expand to regions that produce Resources. Regions on the game board may be "force-mined" by assigning more workers than the Resources they produce, though doing so twice will render the region "depleted", unable to produce Resources for the rest of the game.

=== Objective ===
A player may win by eliminating all other players from the board, or more commonly by either fulfilling their individual victory conditions, having accumulated 15 Conquest Points (20 for opposing players if Aldaris has not been eliminated), or by having the most Conquest Points when two "The End is Near" Event Cards are played (if Aldaris has not been eliminated, Aldaris automatically wins in this event).

== Brood War expansion ==
StarCraft: The Board Game: Brood War
- Designers: Corey Konieczka
- Publishers: Fantasy Flight Games
- Publication: 2008

StarCraft: The Board Game: Brood War is a 2008 expansion to StarCraft: The Board Game. Like the base game, it was designed by Corey Konieczka and published by Fantasy Flight Games. Much of the expansion's new features is centred around the video game's own expansion, StarCraft: Brood War.

A small downloadable expansion is also available that replaces either the Terran Dominion or Raynor's Raiders with the United Earth Directorate.

=== New features ===
- Each of the three races, the Terrans, Protoss, and Zerg, are given new units, and new supporting game material to match. These correspond to the new units in StarCraft: Brood War, as well as the Infested Terran, which was omitted from the base game.
- A number of new planets were added to the game, based on planets seen in Brood War. Some planets are divided into territories which may only permit ground units to enter, while some are restricted to flying units. A number of territories on the new planets are also designated "strategic areas" in lieu of producing Resources or awarding Conquest Points; a player in control of this area has the benefit of having any standard Order issued to this planet treated as its corresponding Special Order.
- Three new modules per faction are added, which offer different combat-related benefits.
- A new Order is added: the Defend Order allows players to move units (similar to a Mobilise order) during the Planning Phase, as well as endowing the territory with a Guard token, which may be discarded in a combat situation to give all defending units greater Health (which does not stack with any other defensive bonuses).
- Leadership Cards have been added to the game. The game is roughly separated into three phases, based on which Event Cards are drawn. At the start of one of these phases, each player may choose a Leadership Card from their Leadership Card Deck, and resolve its effects. Some allow a new victory condition for the player, while others designate one unit as a "hero", which grants the unit special abilities. Some Leadership Cards also place special bases termed "installations".

=== Scenarios ===
Scenario play, with predetermined fixed setups, is also available for use with Brood War, and a number of scenario-specific parts are provided to aid players in making their own.

== Reception ==
In a review of StarCraft: The Board Game in Black Gate, John ONeill said "What I assumed was a simplistic distillation of a complex and nuanced computer game instead seems to be a lively board game that encourages group play."

StarCraft: The Board Game won the Origins Award for Board Game or Expansion of the Year of 2007.

== Reviews ==
- Pyramid
- Rebel Times #2
