= StarCraft: Insurrection =

Extension video game to StarCraft

- Developer: Aztech New Media
- Producer: Fulvio Ciano
- Series: StarCraft
- Release: June 10, 1998
- Genre: Real-time strategy
- Modes: Single-player, multiplayer

StarCraft: Insurrection (also known as Insurrection: Campaigns for StarCraft) is an expansion pack to the StarCraft video game with new campaign missions and multiplayer maps. It was licensed by Blizzard Entertainment to be developed by Canadian studio Aztech New Media and was released on June 10, 1998 for Windows.

== Overview ==
The expansion features three single-player campaigns with 10 missions each and over a hundred multiplayer maps. The campaign takes place during the timeline of the original game's campaigns. They focus on Terran, Protoss and Zerg, and introduce 10 new heroes. The missions focus on an insurrection against Confederacy led by a splinter group called Fist of Redemption with a goal of merging Terran and Zerg races. The campaign is overall much harder than the original game.

== Reception ==
Greg Kasavin of GameSpot gave the game 4.8/10 and noted that the quality of campaign and multiplayer maps does not match the original game. He criticized reused art and sound assets as well as poor audio quality. He also noted that very few multiplayer maps were decent. Denny Atkin of Computer Gaming World rated the expansion 3.5/5 stars and described missions as "well-designed", however criticized lack of new features and subpar UI. Andrey Shevchenko of Absolute Games rated the game at 75% noting lack of innovation and cutscenes, but praising difficulty, mission briefings and heroes. He described the campaign plot as full of "betrayals and intrigue". Aleksandr Vershinin of Game.EXE described it as nowhere near in quality in relation to the later StarCraft: Brood War release. Andrey Okushko of Strana Igr noted that Insurrection received no acclaim at its time despite being officially licensed. He lists the unchanged gameplay and lacking story as main reasons.
