= StarCraft (video game) =

1998 real-time strategy game

- One of three race-specific cover variants released for StarCraft, featuring a Protoss individual as the central figure of the video game case box art; other variants featured Terran and Zerg representatives as the central figure instead.
- Developer: Blizzard Entertainment (Note: N64 version co-developed by Mass Media)
- Publisher: Blizzard Entertainment (Note: N64 version published by Nintendo)
- Producers: Michael Morhaime; James Phinney; Bill Roper
- Designers: Chris Metzen; James Phinney
- Programmer: Bob Fitch
- Artists: Samwise Didier; Duane Stinnett
- Composers: Derek Duke; Jason Hayes; Glenn Stafford; Tracy W. Bush
- Series: StarCraft
- Platforms: Windows; Classic Mac OS; Nintendo 64
- Release: Microsoft Windows; NA: March 31, 1998; EU: April 9, 1998; Mac OS; NA: March 12, 1999; Nintendo 64; NA: June 13, 2000; AU: May 25, 2001
- Genre: Real-time strategy
- Modes: Single-player, multiplayer

StarCraft is a real-time strategy video game developed and published by Blizzard Entertainment for Microsoft Windows. The first installment of the video game series of the same name, it was released in 1998. A Classic Mac OS version was released in 1999, and a Nintendo 64 port co-developed with Mass Media and published by Nintendo was released in 2000.

Blizzard started work on the game shortly after Warcraft II, another real-time strategy game, was released in 1995. The first incarnation debuted at the 1996 Electronic Entertainment Expo, where it was unfavorably compared to Warcraft II. As a result, the project was entirely overhauled before being showcased to the public in early 1997, at which time it received a far more positive response. The game's multiplayer is particularly popular in South Korea, where players and teams participate in professional competitions, earn sponsorships, and compete in televised tournaments.

Set in a future timeline during the 25th century AD in a distant part of the Milky Way galaxy known as the Koprulu Sector, the game revolves around three intelligent species fighting for dominance: the Terrans are humans exiled from Earth who are now skilled at adapting to any situation; the Zerg are a race of insectoid aliens in pursuit of genetic perfection and obsessed with assimilating other species; the Protoss are a humanoid species with advanced technology and psionic abilities who are attempting to preserve their civilization and strict philosophy about their way of life from the Zerg.

Many journalists of the video game industry have praised StarCraft as one of the most important and greatest video games of all time. The game is also said to have raised the bar for developing real-time strategy (RTS) games. With more than 11 million copies sold worldwide by February 2009, StarCraft became one of the best-selling games for the personal computer. It has been praised for pioneering the use of unique factions in RTS gameplay and for having a compelling story.

StarCraft has had its storyline adapted and expanded through a series of novels published between 2000 and 2016, the expansion pack StarCraft: Brood War, and two officially authorized add-ons, Insurrection and Retribution. A sequel, StarCraft II: Wings of Liberty, was released in July 2010, along with two expansion packs and a campaign pack between 2013 and 2016, while a remastered edition of the original and its expansion pack was released in August 2017. The original game, along with the expansion, was released for free in April 2017.

== Gameplay ==
A Protoss force attacking a Zerg colony, shown from StarCraft's isometric perspective

Blizzard Entertainment's use of three distinct races in StarCraft is widely credited with revolutionizing the real-time strategy genre. All units are unique to their respective races, and while rough comparisons can be drawn between certain types of units in the technology tree, every unit performs differently and requires different tactics for a player to succeed.

The psionic and technologically adept Protoss have access to powerful units and machinery and advanced technologies such as energy shields and localized warp capabilities, powered by their psionic traits. However, their forces have lengthy and expensive manufacturing processes, encouraging players to follow a strategy of the quality of their units over quantity. The insectoid Zerg possess entirely organic units and structures, which can be produced quickly and at a far cheaper cost to resources, but are accordingly weaker, relying on sheer numbers and speed to overwhelm enemies. The humanoid Terrans provide a middle ground between the other two races, providing units that are versatile and flexible. They have access to a range of more ballistic military technologies and machinery, such as tanks and nuclear weapons.

Although each race is unique in its composition, no race has an innate advantage over the other. Each species is balanced out so that while they have different strengths, powers, and abilities, their overall strength is the same.

StarCraft features artificial intelligence that scales in difficulty, although the player cannot change the difficulty level in the single-player campaigns. Each campaign starts with enemy factions running easy AI modes, scaling through the course of the campaign to the hardest AI modes. In the level editor provided with the game, a designer has access to four levels of AI difficulties: "easy", "medium", "hard", and "insane", each setting differing in the units and technologies allowed to an AI faction and the extent of the AI's tactical and strategic planning. The single-player campaign consists of thirty missions, split into ten for each race.

=== Resource management ===
Each race relies on two resources to sustain their game economies and to build their forces: minerals and vespene gas. Minerals are needed for all units and structures, and they are obtained by using a worker unit to harvest the resource directly from mineral nodes scattered around the battlefield. Players require vespene gas to construct advanced units and buildings, and they acquire it by constructing a gas extraction building on top of a geyser and using worker units to extract the gas from it. In addition, players need to regulate the supplies for their forces to ensure that they can construct the number of units they need. Although the nature of the supply differs between the races—Terrans use physical supplies held in depots, Protoss use psionic energy channeled from their homeworld via pylons, and Zerg is regulated by the number of controlling overlord units present—the supply mechanic essentially works in exactly the same way for each race (just with differing impacts on gameplay), allowing players to create new units when there are sufficient resources to sustain them.

=== Base construction ===
Protoss and Zerg building construction is limited to specific locations: Protoss buildings need to be linked to a power grid, while almost every Zerg structure must be placed on a carpet of biomass, called "creep", that is produced by certain structures. Terran buildings are far less limited, with certain primary base structures possessing the ability to take off and fly slowly to a new location. Terran buildings, however, require the worker unit to continue construction on the building until it is completed. Also, once a Terran building has taken a certain amount of damage, it will catch fire and can eventually burn to the ground without further enemy action if repairs are not performed by a worker unit. The Protoss, by contrast, only require a worker unit to begin the process of transporting a building to the theater of operations via warp, and their buildings' shields (but not their structure) are regenerative. The Zerg worker unit physically transforms into the structure created, which is capable of slowly healing itself.

=== Multiplayer ===
Multiplayer on StarCraft is powered through Blizzard Entertainment's Battle.net Internet service. Through this, a maximum of eight players can compete in a variety of game modes, including simply destroying all other players (which may be competitive, as in Ladder play, or non-ranked, as in melee play), to king of the hill and capture the flag objective-based games. In addition, the game incorporates a variety of specialized scenarios for different types of game, such as simulating a football game, using the Terran hoverbike unit to conduct a bike race, or hosting a Zerg hunting competition. StarCraft is also one of the few games that includes a spawn installation, which allows for limited multiplayer. It must be installed from a disc, and requires a product key to work just as the full version does. However, one product key can support up to eight spawned installations with access to Battle.net. Limitations of a spawned installation include the inability to play single-player missions, create multiplayer games, or use the campaign editor. Newer releases of the game available through Battle.net or discs that include the Windows Vista label don't support the spawn installation.

== Synopsis ==
=== Setting ===
StarCraft takes place in a science fiction universe created by Chris Metzen and James Phinney for Blizzard Entertainment. According to the story presented in the game's manual, the overpopulation of Earth in the early 24th century has caused the international governing body, known as United Powers League (which was later succeeded by United Earth Directorate), to exile certain members of the human race, such as criminals, the cybernetically enhanced, and genetic mutants, to colonize the far reaches of the galaxy. An attempt to colonize a nearby solar system goes wrong, resulting in humanity's arrival in the Koprulu Sector. In the distant Koprulu Sector of the galaxy, the exiles form several governments, but quickly fall into conflict with each other. One government, the Confederacy of Man, eventually emerges as the strongest faction, but its oppressive nature and brutal methods of suppressing dissidents stir up major rebel opposition in the form of a terrorist group called the Sons of Korhal. Just prior to the beginning of the game, in December 2499, an alien race possessing advanced technology and psionic power, the Protoss, makes first contact with humanity by destroying a Confederate colony world without any prior warning. Soon after this, the Terrans discover that a second alien race, the insectoid Zerg, has been stealthily infesting the surface of several of the Terran colonies, and that the Protoss are destroying the planets to prevent the Zerg from spreading. With the Confederacy threatened by two alien races and internal rebellion, it begins to crumble.

=== Characters ===
The player assumes the role of three nameless characters over the course of the game. In the first act, the player acts as the Confederate magistrate of an outlying colony world of Mar Sara, threatened by both the Zerg and the Protoss, and is forced through events to join the rebel Sons of Korhal under its leader Arcturus Mengsk. Mengsk's campaign is accompanied by Jim Raynor, a morally conscious law enforcement officer from Mar Sara, and Sarah Kerrigan, a psychic assassin and Mengsk's second-in-command. The second episode of the game sees the player as a cerebrate, a commander within the Zerg Swarm. The player is ruled over by the Zerg Overmind – the manifestation of the collective consciousness of the Swarm and the game's primary antagonist – and is given advice from other cerebrates of higher rank and status while accomplishing the objectives of the Swarm. In the final part of StarCraft, the player is a newly appointed Executor within the Protoss military reporting to Aldaris, a representative of the Protoss government. Aldaris is at odds with Tassadar – the former occupant of the player's position – over his association with Zeratul, a member of a heretical group known as dark templar.

=== Story ===
Plot exposition often takes place in menu-like screens, with only the characters' faces shown, and their captioned voices are heard.

The story of StarCraft is presented through its instruction manual, the briefings to each mission, and conversations within the missions themselves, along with the use of cinematic cutscenes at key points. The campaign is split into three episodes, each allowing the player to command one of the game's three races. In the first segment of the game, the player and Jim Raynor are attempting to control the colony of Mar Sara in the wake of the Zerg attacks on other Terran worlds. After the Confederacy arrests Raynor for destroying Confederate property, despite the fact that it had been infested by the Zerg, the player joins Arcturus Mengsk and the Sons of Korhal. Raynor, who is freed by Mengsk's troops, also joins and frequently accompanies the player on missions. Mengsk then begins to use Confederate technology captured on Mar Sara to lure the Zerg to Confederate installations and further his own goals. After forcing Confederate general Edmund Duke to join him, Mengsk sacrifices his own second-in-command, Sarah Kerrigan, to ensure the destruction of the Confederacy by luring the Zerg to the Confederate capital Tarsonis. Raynor is outraged by Mengsk's true aims of obtaining power at any cost and deserts, followed by the player, taking with them a small army of the former colonial militia of Mar Sara. Mengsk reorganizes what remains of the Terran population into the Terran Dominion, crowning himself as emperor.

The second campaign reveals that Kerrigan was not killed by the Zerg, but rather is captured and infested in an effort to incorporate her psionic traits into the Zerg gene pool. She emerges with far more psionic powers and physical strength, her DNA completely altered. Meanwhile, the Protoss commander Tassadar discovers that the Zerg's cerebrates cannot be killed by conventional means, but that they can be harmed by the powers wielded by the heretical dark templar. Tassadar allies himself with the dark templar prelate Zeratul, who assassinates Zasz, one of the Zerg's cerebrates in their hive clusters on Char. The cerebrate's death results in its forces running amok through the Zerg hives, but briefly links the minds of Zeratul and the Zerg Overmind, allowing the Overmind to finally learn the location of the Protoss homeworld Aiur, which the Overmind has been seeking for millennia. The main Zerg swarm promptly invades Aiur, while Kerrigan is dispatched to deal with Tassadar, and despite facing heavy Protoss resistance, the Overmind is able to embed itself into the crust of the planet.

The final episode of the game sees Aldaris and the Protoss government branding Tassadar a traitor and a heretic for conspiring with the dark templar. The player (later retconned to be Artanis) initially serves Aldaris in defending Aiur from the Zerg invasion, but while on a mission to arrest Tassadar, the player joins him instead. A Protoss civil war erupts, pitting Tassadar, Zeratul, and their allies against the Protoss establishment (known as The Conclave.) The dark templar prove their worth when they use their energies to slay two more of the Zerg cerebrates on Aiur, and the Conclave reconciles with them. Aided by Raynor's forces—who sided with Tassadar back on Char—the Protoss break through the Overmind's weakened defenses and destroy the Overmind's outer shell, but take heavy casualties in the process. Tassadar channels his own psionic energies in combination with those of the dark templar through the hull of his command ship and crashes it into the Overmind, sacrificing himself in order to destroy it.

== Development ==
Blizzard Entertainment began development on StarCraft in 1995, shortly after the release of highly successful Warcraft II: Tides of Darkness. Using the Tides of Darkness game engine as a base, StarCraft made its debut at E3 1996. The version of the game displayed, assembled by the team's lead programmer Bob Fitch, received a rather weak response from the convention and was criticized by many for being "Warcraft in space." According to programmer Patrick Wyatt, the E3 1996 build of StarCraft fared especially poorly in comparison to Dominion: Storm Over Gift 3, another science fiction real-time strategy game which was being demoed at E3, despite the fact that the demo had been faked by Ion Storm employees; in reality, the demo for Dominion was actually a pre-rendered video that the employees were merely pretending to play. As a consequence the entire project was overhauled, bringing the focus onto creating three distinct species. Bill Roper, one of the game's producers, stated this would be a major departure from the Warcraft approach, comparing its two equal sides to those of chess and stating that StarCraft would allow players to "develop very unique strategies based on which species is being played, and will require players to think of different strategies to combat the other two species." The hand-drawn graphics seen in the E3 version were also replaced with rendered graphics.

In early 1997, the new version of StarCraft was unveiled, receiving a far more positive response. The Terrans and the Protoss were detailed to a much greater extent than at E3 1996, revealing many of the game's units in forms similar to those of the final product. However, the game was still marred by technical difficulties, so Bob Fitch completely redesigned the Warcraft II engine within two months to ensure that many of the features desired by the designers, such as the abilities for units to burrow and cloak, could be implemented.

Later improvements to the game included pre-rendered sprites and backgrounds, constructed using 3D Studio Max. An isometric in-game view was also adopted, in contrast to Warcraft II's auxiliary bird's eye perspective. The races would taken on their now-recognisable graphical styles: the brown insectoid design of the Zerg, the sleek yellow armour of the Protoss, and the grey machinery of the Terrans. Most of the unit designs were established at this point, their graphics only undergoing minor changes. Several game features were also added at this stage that never made it into the final release, such as ships banking as they turned, transport ships landing on the ground to pick up and drop off passengers, and efficiency ranks, although Terran units would retain ranks as a purely aesthetic feature. The Terran Valkyrie-class missile frigate also appeared in this build of the game, although it was removed before the final release, only to be reintroduced later in the Brood War expansion. The game utilized high quality music, composed by Blizzard's resident composers, and professional voice actors were hired.

Despite the progress, StarCraft was slow to emerge. The continual delays inspired a group of StarCraft fans on the official forums who labeled themselves "Operation: Can't Wait Any Longer" to write a series of fictional stories in which the members of Operation CWAL attempted to retrieve the beta version of StarCraft from Blizzard's headquarters in Irvine, California. To pay homage to their presence on the forums and enthusiasm for the game, Blizzard Entertainment later incorporated the group's name into StarCraft as a cheat code to speed up the production of units and gave the group thanks in the game's credits. The game was released for Windows on March 31, 1998 and in the United Kingdom on April 9, with the Classic Mac OS version following a year later on March 12, 1999. Development on a Nintendo 64 version, StarCraft 64, began in 1999, converted from PC by Mass Media Interactive Entertainment—a subsidiary of THQ—and published by Nintendo. StarCraft 64 was released in the United States on June 13, 2000, and in Australia on May 25, 2001.

=== Music ===
The musical score to StarCraft was composed by Blizzard Entertainment's composers. Glenn Stafford composed the Terran and Protoss in-game themes, while Derek Duke, who was a contracted composer at the time, wrote all the in-game music for the Zerg. The cinematic scores were composed by Stafford and Hayes. Hayes also collaborated with Stafford on one of the Protoss in-game tracks. Tracy W. Bush provided additional support in composing. The musical score of the game was received well by reviewers, who have described it as "appropriately melodic and dark" and "impressive", with one reviewer noting that some of the music owed much of its inspiration to Jerry Goldsmith's score for the film Alien. The first official game soundtrack, StarCraft: Game Music Vol. 1, was released in 2000, comprising tracks from both StarCraft and Brood War, as well as a sizable portion of remix tracks and music inspired by StarCraft, created by several South Korean disc jockeys. The soundtrack was distributed by Net Vision Entertainment. In September 2008, Blizzard Entertainment announced that a second soundtrack, StarCraft Original Soundtrack, had been released on iTunes. This soundtrack consisted entirely of the original music from StarCraft and Brood War, both from in-game themes to music used in the cinematic cutscenes.

== Expansions and versions ==
=== Computer expansions ===
Before the release of StarCraft, Blizzard Entertainment released a free-to-download game demo entitled Loomings, comprising three missions and a tutorial. The prequel was made available for the full game in October 1999 as a custom map campaign, adding two extra missions and hosting it on Battle.net. In addition, the full release of StarCraft included a secondary campaign entitled Enslavers. Consisting of five missions played as both the Terrans and the Protoss, Enslavers is set in the second campaign in StarCraft and follows the story of a Terran smuggler who manages to take control of a Zerg cerebrate and is pursued by both the Protoss and Terran Dominion. Enslavers acts as an exemplar single-player campaign for the game's level editor, highlighting how to use the features of the program.

StarCraft's first expansion, Insurrection, was released for Windows on July 31, 1998. The expansion was developed by Aztech New Media and authorized by Blizzard Entertainment. Its story focused on a separate Confederate colony alluded to in the manual to StarCraft, following a group of Terran colonists and a Protoss fleet in their fight against the Zerg and a rising local insurgency. Insurrection was not received well, being criticized by reviewers for lacking the quality of the original game. Insurrection was followed within a few months by a second expansion, Retribution. Developed by Stardock, published by WizardWorks and authorized by Blizzard Entertainment, Retribution follows all three races attempting to seize control of a powerful crystal on a Terran Dominion colony. The expansion was not received with critical support, instead being regarded as average but at least challenging. After the release of Retribution, Blizzard Entertainment announced a new official expansion pack that would continue on the story of StarCraft. StarCraft: Brood War was consequently created, developed jointly by Blizzard Entertainment and Saffire. Brood War continues the story of StarCraft from days after its conclusion, and was released for both Windows and Mac to critical praise on December 18, 1998, in the US and in March 1999 in Europe.

Before Insurrection, an unauthorized expansion pack, called Stellar Forces, was published by Micro Star but was recalled weeks later when Micro Star settled a lawsuit brought by Blizzard against it. It consisted of 22 single player maps and 32 multi-player maps which are considered to be rather plain.

=== Nintendo 64 version ===
StarCraft 64 had a lower resolution and a redesigned interface for the Nintendo 64's gamepad.

In 2000, StarCraft 64 was released in North America for the Nintendo 64, co-developed by Blizzard Entertainment and Mass Media and published by Nintendo. The N64 port features all of the missions from both StarCraft and the expansion Brood War, as well as some exclusive missions, such as two different tutorials and a new secret mission, Resurrection IV. Blizzard Entertainment had initially considered releasing a home console port onto the PlayStation, but the team ultimately decided to develop and release it for the Nintendo 64 instead. Resurrection IV is set after the conclusion of Brood War, and follows Jim Raynor embarking on a mission to rescue the Brood War character Alexei Stukov, a vice admiral from Earth who has been captured by the Zerg. The Brood War missions required the use of a Nintendo 64 memory Expansion Pak to run.

In addition, StarCraft 64 features a split screen cooperative mode, also requiring the expansion pak, allowing two players to control one force in-game. StarCraft 64 lacked the online multiplayer capabilities and speech in mission briefings. In addition, cut scenes were shortened. StarCraft 64 was a runner-up for GameSpot's annual "Best Game Story" and "Best Strategy Game" awards among console games, which went respectively to Summoner and Ogre Battle 64.

== Remaster ==
A remastered edition of the game, StarCraft: Remastered, released August 14, 2017, preserves the gameplay of the original while adding support for ultra-high-definition graphics, Blizzard's modern online features, and re-recorded audio (soundtrack and sound effects).

=== StarCraft: Cartooned ===
On June 8, 2019, as part of the grand finals of the third season of the KSL, Blizzard announced a graphics overhaul pack for the game by Carbot Animations, the producers of multiple Blizzard-related parody animations, including their first and longest-running one, the StarCrafts series. As a graphical overhaul, its effect applies to all game modes and menus in StarCraft: Remastered. It was released on July 10, 2019, as StarCraft: Cartooned alongside an announcer pack featuring South Korean YouTuber and children's television host Hyejin "Hey Jini" Kang.

== Cultural impact ==
Reception

Aggregate scores
| Aggregator | Score |
|---|---|
| GameRankings | 93% (PC & Mac); 77% (Nintendo 64) |
| Metacritic | 88/100 (PC & Mac); 80/100 (Nintendo 64) |

Review scores
| Publication | Score |
|---|---|
| AllGame | 4.5/5 (PC & Mac) |
| GameFan | 215/300 (Nintendo 64) |
| GamePro | 4.5/5 (PC & Mac); 4.5/5 (Nintendo 64) |
| GameRevolution | B (PC & Mac) |
| GameSpot | 9.1/10 (PC & Mac); 8.4/10 (Nintendo 64) |
| IGN | 9.5/10 (PC & Mac); 7.7/10 (Nintendo 64) |
| Next Generation | 5/5 |
| PC Gamer (UK) | 92% (PC & Mac) |
| PC Zone | 8.8/10 (PC & Mac) |

Awards
| Publication | Award |
|---|---|
| GameSpot | Greatest Games of All Time |
| AIAS | Computer Entertainment Title of the Year |
| Computer Gaming World | Game of the Year |
| PC PowerPlay | Game of the Year |
| PC Gamer | RTS Game of the Year |
| Games Domain | Strategy Game of the Year |
| Game Informer | 35th Greatest Game of All Time |

=== Reception ===
StarCraft was released internationally on March 31, 1998, and became the best-selling PC game for that year, selling over 1.5 million copies worldwide. In the United States, it was the best-selling computer game of 1998, with 746,365 units sold. It was the country's 14th best-selling release of the period between 1993 and 1999, selling 916,000 copies. By April 1999, South Korean players had purchased almost 300,000 units of the game, increasing to 1 million units sold in Korea by November 1999. StarCraft's worldwide sales reached 4 million units by July 2001; South Korea accounted for 50% of these copies. By May 2007, StarCraft had sold over 9.5 million copies across the globe, with 4.5 million of these being sold in South Korea. Since the initial release of StarCraft, Blizzard Entertainment reported that its Battle.net online multiplayer service grew by 800 percent.

Generally, StarCraft was received positively by critics, with many contemporary reviewers noting that while the game may not have deviated significantly from the status quo of most real-time strategy games, it was one of the best to have applied the formula. In addition, StarCraft's pioneering use of three distinct, unique, and balanced races over two equal sides was praised by critics, with GameSpot commenting that this helped the game to "avoid the problem that has plagued every other game in the genre". Many critics also praised the strength of the story accompanying the game, with some reviewers being impressed by how well the story was folded into the gameplay. The game's voice acting in particular was praised; GameSpot later hailed the voice work in the game as one of the ten best in the industry at the time. Equally, the multiplayer aspects of the game were positively received. StarCraft has received multiple awards, including being named as one of the best games of all time by GameSpot, IGN, and Game Informer. According to Blizzard Entertainment, StarCraft has won 37 awards and has received a star on the floor of the Metreon as part of the Walk of Game in San Francisco in early 2006.

Other reviews have echoed much of this positive reception. The site The Gamers' Temple described the species as "very diverse but well-balanced, " stating that this allowed for "a challenging and fun gaming experience." Allgame stated that the inclusion of three "dynamic" species "raises the bar" for real-time strategy games, complimenting the game for forcing the player to "learn how [the aliens'] minds work and not think like a human". Commentators have also praised the aesthetic design of the three races; in particular, the powered armor worn by the Terran Marine was rated eleventh on in a Maxim feature on the top armor suits in video games, and ninth in a similar feature by Machinima.com.

Next Generation reviewed the PC version of the game, rating it five stars out of five, and stated that "The quality of the play balancing and the elegance of the design mean that StarCraft sets a new high watermark for all real-time strategy games." The reviewer from the online second volume of Pyramid stated that "One of the most hotly anticipated computer games of the last two years, Blizzard Entertainment's Starcraft has had a tremendous amount of hype to live up to. The fact that it does live up to the high expectations set for it may be the only recommendation it needs."

This positive view, however, is not universally held. For example, Computer and Video Games, while describing the game as "highly playable, " nevertheless described a "slight feeling of déjà vu" between the three races. Although at the time StarCraft's graphics and audio were praised by critics, later reviews have noted that the graphics do not compare to more modern games. The capacity for the game's artificial intelligence to navigate units to waypoints also faced some heavy criticism, with PC Zone stating that the inability for developers to make an effective pathfinding system was "the single most infuriating element of the real-time strategy genre". In addition, several reviewers expressed concern over some familiarities between the unit structures of each race, as well as over the potential imbalance of players using rushing tactics early in multiplayer games.

The Nintendo 64 version of the game was not received as positively by reviewers, and was criticized for poor graphics in comparison to the PC version. However, critics did praise the game and Mass Media for using effective controls on the gamepad and maintaining the high quality audio.

At the inaugural Interactive Achievement Awards (now known as the D.I.C.E. Awards), StarCraft won "Computer Entertainment Title of the Year", and tied with Age of Empires for "PC Strategy Game of the Year". Starcraft also won the Origins Award for Best Strategy Computer Game of 1998.

In 1998, PC Gamer declared it the 5th-best computer game ever released, and the editors called it "a strategy game that continues to evolve and surprise many months after its release, and that currently represents the state of the genre's art".

With more than 11 million copies sold worldwide by February 2009, StarCraft became one of the best-selling games for the personal computer. It has been praised for pioneering the use of unique factions in RTS gameplay, and for having a compelling story.

=== Legacy ===
Before StarCraft, most real-time strategy games consisted of factions and races with the same basic play styles and units with mostly superficial differences. Thus, the uniqueness and variety of the species in the StarCraft series has been well received by many of the industry's critics. In their review for StarCraft, IGN's Tom Chick observed that the balance and difference between the races was "remarkable", continuing to praise the game's "radical" approach to different races and its high degree of success when compared with other games in the genre. IGN was also positive about the unit arrangements for the three races, crediting Blizzard Entertainment for not letting units become obsolete during extended play and for showing an "extraordinary amount of patience in balancing them." GameSpot was complimentary of the species in its review for StarCraft, describing the races as being full of personality.

GameSpot described StarCraft as "The defining game of its genre. It is the standard by which all real-time strategy games are judged." IGN stated that StarCraft "is hands down one of the best, if not the best, real-time strategy games ever created." StarCraft is frequently included in the industry's best games rankings, for example it ranked 37 in Edge's top 100 games of all time. StarCraft has even been taken into space, as astronaut Daniel T. Barry took a copy of the game with him on the Space Shuttle mission STS-96 in 1999. StarCraft's popularity resulted in Guinness World Records awarding the game four world records, including "Best Selling PC Strategy Game," "Largest Income in Professional Gaming," and "Largest Audience for a Game Competition" when 120,000 fans turned out to watch the final of the SKY proleague season 2005 in Busan, South Korea. Researchers have shown that the audience for watching StarCraft games is diverse and that StarCraft uses instances of information asymmetry to make the game more entertaining for spectators. In addition, StarCraft has been the subject of an academic course; the University of California, Berkeley offered a student-run introductory course on theory and strategy in spring 2009.

After its release, StarCraft rapidly grew in popularity in South Korea. Professional gamers in South Korea are media celebrities, and StarCraft games are broadcast over three television channels dedicated to the professional gaming scene. Professional gamers in South Korea have gained television contracts, sponsorships, and tournament prizes, allowing one of the most famous players, Lim "BoxeR" Yo-hwan, to gain a fan club of over half a million people. One player, Lee Yun-yeol, reported earnings in 2005 of US$200,000 (equivalent to $329,698 in 2025).

StarCraft was part of the United States Air Force's Air and Space Basic Course, used to teach newly active officers about crisis planning under stress and joint service teamwork. Other efforts to make more 'realistic' current-day battle software led to distractions when simulated hardware didn't align with the real hardware active duty officers knew about. The science fiction setting allowed students to focus on the battle tactics.

The annual Conference on Artificial Intelligence and Interactive Digital Entertainment hosts a competition for AIs playing the game. As of 2015, humans still win.

In 2014, an unofficial version for the Pandora handheld and the ARM architecture became available by static recompilation and reverse engineering of the original x86 version.

The original game, along with the expansion, was released for free in April 2017.

In 2021, The Strong National Museum of Play inducted StarCraft to its World Video Game Hall of Fame. During the 2022 Russian Invasion of Ukraine, Ukrainian presidential spokesman and Chief of Staff Oleksiy Arestovych described reports of a potential Russian offensive as a "zerg rush" of 10,000 volunteers (in reference to Zerg swarm species tactics from the game), and proceeded to explain the meaning of the term.

=== Merchandise ===
The storyline of StarCraft has been adapted into several novels. The first novel, Uprising, which was written by Blizzard employee Micky Neilson and published in December 2000, acts as a prequel to the events of StarCraft. Other novels—Liberty's Crusade by Jeff Grubb and Aaron Rosenberg's Queen of Blades—retell the story of the game from different perspectives. At BlizzCon 2007, StarCraft creator Chris Metzen stated that he hoped to novelize the entirety of StarCraft and its expansion Brood War into a definitive text-based story. Later novels, such as Gabriel Mesta's Shadow of the Xel'Naga and Christie Golden's The Dark Templar Saga, further expand the storyline, creating the setting for StarCraft II.

A number of action figures and collectable statues based upon the characters and units in StarCraft have been produced by ToyCom. A number of model kits, made by Academy Hobby Model Kits, were also produced, displaying 1/30 scale versions of the marine and the hydralisk. In addition, Blizzard Entertainment teamed up with Fantasy Flight Games to create a board game with detailed sculptures of game characters. Blizzard Entertainment also licensed Wizards of the Coast to produce an Alternity based game entitled StarCraft Adventures.

== See also ==
- Barcraft
