= StarCraft II: Nova Covert Ops =

- Developer: Blizzard Entertainment
- Publisher: Blizzard Entertainment
- Director: Dustin Bowder
- Designer: Jason Huck
- Writers: Valerie Watrous; James Waugh
- Composer: Jason Hayes
- Series: StarCraft II
- Platforms: Microsoft Windows, macOS
- Release: Pack 1; March 29, 2016; Pack 2; August 2, 2016; Pack 3; November 22, 2016
- Genre: Real-time strategy
- Mode: Single-player

StarCraft II: Nova Covert Ops is a downloadable content (DLC) single-player mission pack for the military science fiction real-time strategy game series StarCraft II. Consisting of nine missions, it was released over the course of three installments as DLC, with three missions in each separably purchasable pack. The first mission pack was released on March 29, 2016, the second mission pack released on August 2, 2016 and the final mission pack was released on November 22, 2016.

The plot focuses on the aftermath of StarCraft II: Legacy of the Void, set sometime after its conclusion in 2508. The protagonist is the psionic operative Nova, a character announced in 2002 as the lead character of the game StarCraft: Ghost, which was cancelled during development.

Gaming media commented that the mission packs were a proxy for the cancelled StarCraft: Ghost, though Blizzard said that its story was not a large factor of Nova Covert Ops's storyline. The mission pack is centered around Nova, offering several strategies and customisation such as stealth and mobility, similar to what the intention of StarCraft: Ghost was.

== Gameplay ==
The gameplay of Nova Covert Ops retains the same general gameplay as the base game. The game is focused around the hero unit of Nova, similar to Kerrigan in StarCraft II: Heart of the Swarm. As a hero unit she is given unique abilities and improved characteristics. More choice is present in Nova's customisation, in comparison to the more diverse and cumulative paths of Kerrigan. Nova is given generally greater durability, damage and abilities than other units. New technology and weaponry are available for Nova and other units to unlock, although these are sometimes unlocked automatically or after enough missions. Equipment and research must be chosen over others in the same slot between missions. However, Nova cannot acquire levels like Kerrigan, and her abilities are determined by equipment choices. In only some areas of the mission pack is Nova the sole unit to be controlled. The mission pack places a greater emphasis on tactics but retains the base building and resource collection mechanics of StarCraft.

In missions with base-building elements, Nova may die and respawn after enough time has passed. In missions without base elements however, Nova's death will cause the player's defeat. Missions, like those in previous StarCraft II campaigns, are meant to avoid the build and destroy design seen in the first StarCraft's missions. Stealth and platforming elements are present in missions.

In line with the add-on nature of the mission pack, it is smaller in scale than the predecessor campaigns. The campaign is linear, and inter-mission content restricted to non-interactive cutscenes and static UI. Units are automatically unlocked, although upgrades to Nova and other units are contingent on discoveries during gameplay or completion of secondary objectives. However, some of the features from the previous campaigns of StarCraft II remain; more than the first StarCraft's inter-mission content being cutscenes and briefing rooms.

== Synopsis ==
=== Setting ===
The setting of Nova Covert Ops takes place in a Dominion ruled by Valerian Mengsk, who seeks to rule in a manner less tyrannical than his late father, Arcturus. Mirroring the original StarCraft, dissent has begun to take hold. The Zerg have begun to attack again. After what is seen as ineffective responses by the Dominion government, people lend their support to the newly formed Defenders of Man group. In the aftermath of Legacy of the Void, the Tal'darim have shaken off their connection to the Xel'naga Amon, while still retaining their customs of strength and usurping their superiors. The mission pack takes place in a variety of settings, from isolated, obscure worlds, to the capital of Terran space, Korhal. Several systems and planets reoccur, such as the Tyrador system and Antiga Prime.

=== Characters ===
Nova Covert Ops refers extensively to events and characters explored out of the games. The protagonist is Nova Terra, whose aristocratic background led to her crossing paths with the primary antagonist, Carolina Davis, long before the events of the mission pack. Several recurring characters from StarCraft II appear, as well as minor characters from the comics. Nova has become less ruthless from her days as a brainwashed agent of Arcturus Mengsk, and granted more autonomy. Another character is the newly introduced Reigel, a former archaeologist/scientist who advises and assists Nova.

=== Plot ===
Nova awakes in an unknown location with no memories of her recent past. After receiving a warning to escape, Nova eventually learns that she and some of her fellow Ghosts had been captured and brainwashed by insurrectionist group the Defenders of Man. After splitting up with the others, Nova contacts the Dominion flagship the Hyperion. Nova learns from the Dominion's military head Admiral Matt Horner that she is wanted for defecting to the Defenders of Man. Meeting with Emperor Valerian, who reinstates her into service, Nova is tasked with investigating her connection with the Defenders of Man, and the new Zerg attacks on human-space. To aid her with her mission, she is given command of the spaceship Griffin, and a crew including Reigel as her second in command. Arriving at the ruins of her homeworld and former Confederate capital Tarsonis, she discovers the Defenders of Man are using the Confederate-pioneered Psi-Emitters to attack human worlds and then save them, in order to drum up opposition against Valerian by making the Dominion appear weak.

After coming into contact with Tal'darim Protoss, Nova is contacted by Tal'darim Highlord Alarak, who offers his assistance in restoring Nova's memories if she can help destroy rebel Tal'darim. Nova does so, and begins to remember some of her previous memories. Nova comes to remember that while she was brainwashed by the Defenders of Man, she had helped plant a number of Psi-Emitters on Dominion worlds to stage Zerg attacks. She also remembers that the Defenders of Man are led by General Carolina Davis, a secret loyalist of the previous regime under Arcturus Mengsk. Alarak also reveals that the Defenders of Man attacked the Tal'darim in an effort to provoke him, and promises to exact his revenge upon them.

Realizing Davis' machinations, Valerian sends a false offer of abdication to Davis to distract her. Nova infiltrates Davis' base and arrests her right as Valerian exposes her crimes to the Dominion using the evidence Nova gathered. Davis' plan is revealed and most of the Defenders of Man rejoin the Dominion. However Alarak, angry that the Defenders of Man were not wiped out, attacks the Dominion, causing heavy losses before Nova and the Dominion fleet drive him away. In the confusion, Davis escapes and attacks a Dominion shipyard with a Dominion superweapon called the Xanthos. Nova boards the Xanthos and kills Davis against Valerian's orders. Reigel and the Griffin's crew remain loyal to Nova, who decides to protect the Dominion in her own way while not being restricted by its laws. Horner is commanded by Valerian to let her depart for the time being.

== Development ==
In the aftermath of Legacy of the Void, it was decided that a return to the Terran perspective was natural. The story was designed to be in contrast to the StarCraft II campaigns; ones that were seen as great in scope—with it becoming smaller in scale and grittier, evocative of the original StarCraft. Several plot-points in Nova Covert Ops were mirrors of the original StarCraft, including rebellion and the use of devices to control the Zerg. A focal point of the mission pack is to distinguish between Nova and Kerrigan, drawing similarities and differences between the two; as the two were former brainwashed Ghosts, and the two greatest human psionics. James Waugh, the writer of Legacy of the Void, noted that an important element of the story is choice—bringing up another similarity to Kerrigan, in their defections from the Mengsk family. Waugh serves as the story director for Nova Covert Ops; Valerie Watrous, a co-writer on Legacy of the Void, serves as the primary writer. Nova Covert Ops was intended to demonstrate Blizzard's transition into releasing more frequent content.

The background lore of Nova Covert Ops was extensively developed in the years before it, including novels and comics revolving around the eponymous character. Nova's story was succeeded by the novel StarCraft: Evolution, which was published after it in 2016. In addition, the story of Nova: Covert Ops was directly followed by the StarCraft: Shadow Wars series, which also featured Nova and Reigel.

== Release ==
Prior to StarCraft II: Legacy of the Void's release, Nova Covert Ops was announced. A teaser trailer was released on the StarCraft YouTube channel on November 6. Nova Covert Ops released as a stand-alone which did not require any previous StarCraft II purchase. The final chapter released on November 22, 2016 with a large patch and multiplayer update, the 3.8.0 version of the game, which contained substantial updates to the competitive multiplayer of the game.

== Reception ==
StarCraft II: Nova Covert Ops Mission Pack 1

Aggregate score
Aggregator	Score
Metacritic	73/100

Review scores
Publication	Score
Destructoid	75
IGN	62

StarCraft II: Nova Covert Ops Mission Pack 2

Review scores
Publication	Score
Destructoid	75
IGN	64

StarCraft II: Nova Covert Ops Mission Pack 3

Review score
Publication	Score
Destructoid	70

The mission packs received a mostly positive reception, with praise given to the gameplay, mission variety, and sound quality present and criticism levied at the length and story of the pack. The reception of the mission designs was mixed, with some reviewers believing they were sporadic in quality. In contrast, the story and length of the missions were generally negatively received. Nova's fan favourite status and the proxy of Nova Covert Ops for StarCraft: Ghost were consistently addressed. IGN noted that the story of the first two-mission packs felt poorly executed and their lengths felt too short.

Destructoid's Chris Carter commented on Nova Covert Ops' drawing point being Nova and praised the customization features but criticized the story as being inconsistent with the darker tone of the series, calling the ending "a little too neatly wrapped." Impulsegamer's James Wright commented positively on the quality and polish of the content and, while noting the overall shortness of it, called it "a must have add-on for all fans of StarCraft 2."
