= Walk of Game =

Former video game attraction

Coordinates: 37°47′04″N 122°24′12″W

The Walk of Game was an attraction in the United States honoring the icons and pioneers of the video game industry, created in 2005 and located inside the Sony Metreon, an entertainment shopping center in San Francisco, California. It noted the most influential game characters of that year.

Gamers worldwide cast their votes through paper ballots and online submissions at the Walk of Game website during a one-month voting period. Ballots were held during October in the years 2005 and 2006. The top four games/characters and two lifetime achievers were honored with a permanent 24-by-24-inch (60 cm × 60 cm) customized steel star on Walk of Game.

The attraction was based on Hollywood, California's Walk of Fame, as suggested by the similar name and customized floor tiles.

In February 2006, Sony sold the Metreon to The Westfield Group. With the departure of Sony, the Walk of Game was never again updated. In 2012, the area of the Walk of Game was converted to a Target store. The Walk of Game was removed, along with the walkway which it had occupied.

	2005	2006
Game/character awards	Mario; Link; Sonic the Hedgehog; Halo	StarCraft; Lara Croft; Final Fantasy; EverQuest
Lifetime achievement awards	Shigeru Miyamoto; Nolan Bushnell	John Carmack; Sid Meier

== Gallery ==
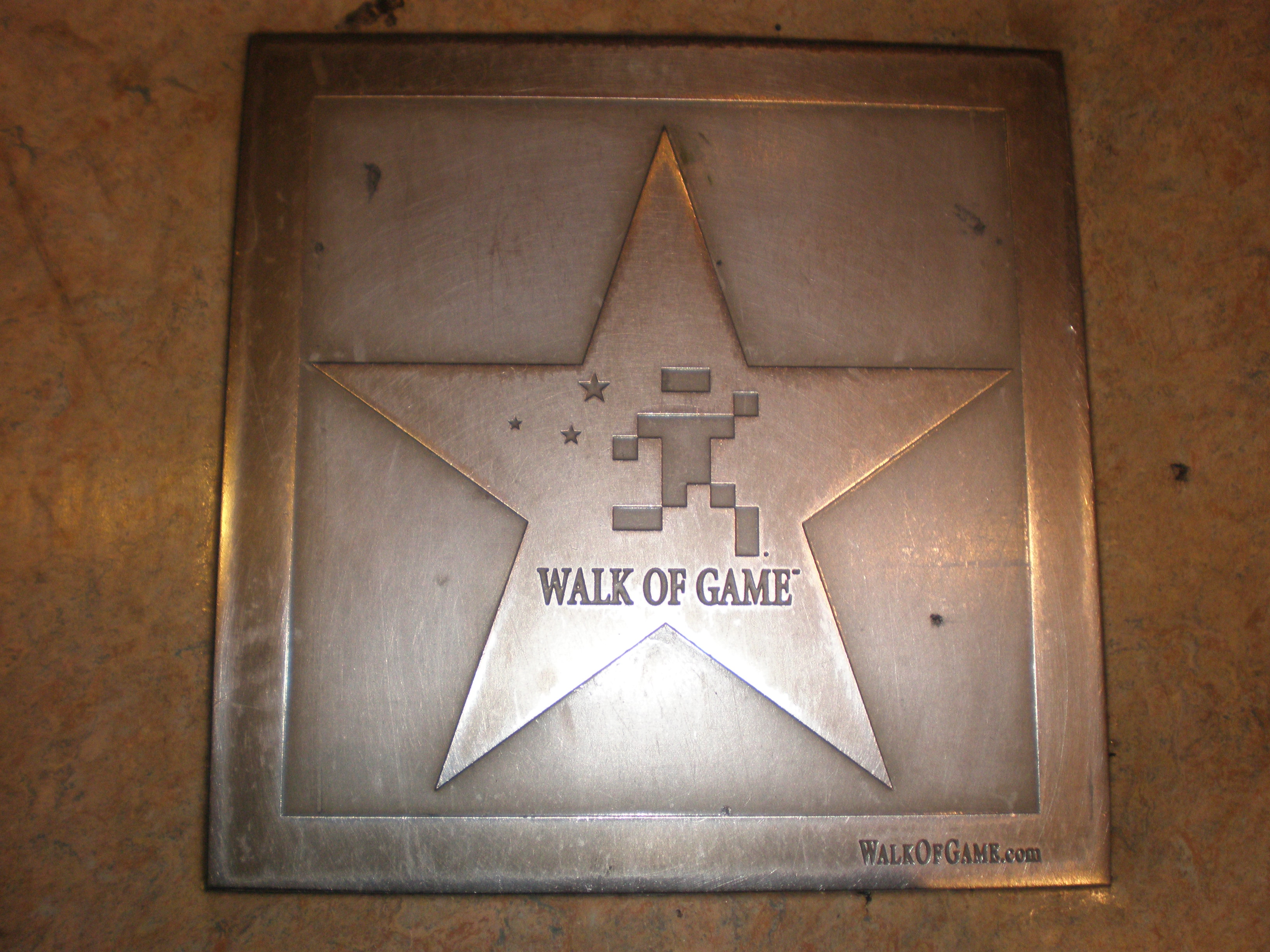
A star with no name on it.

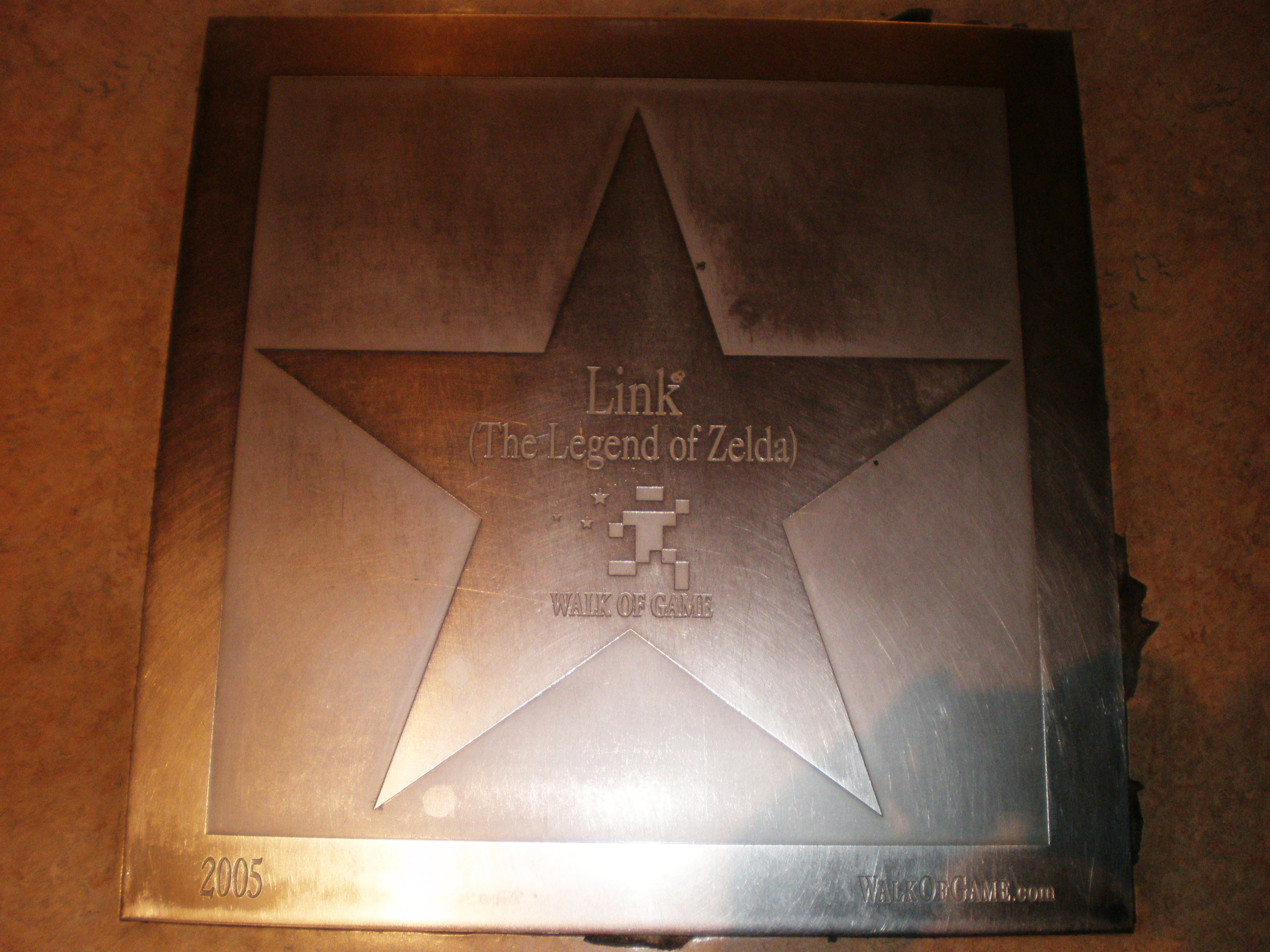
Link's star

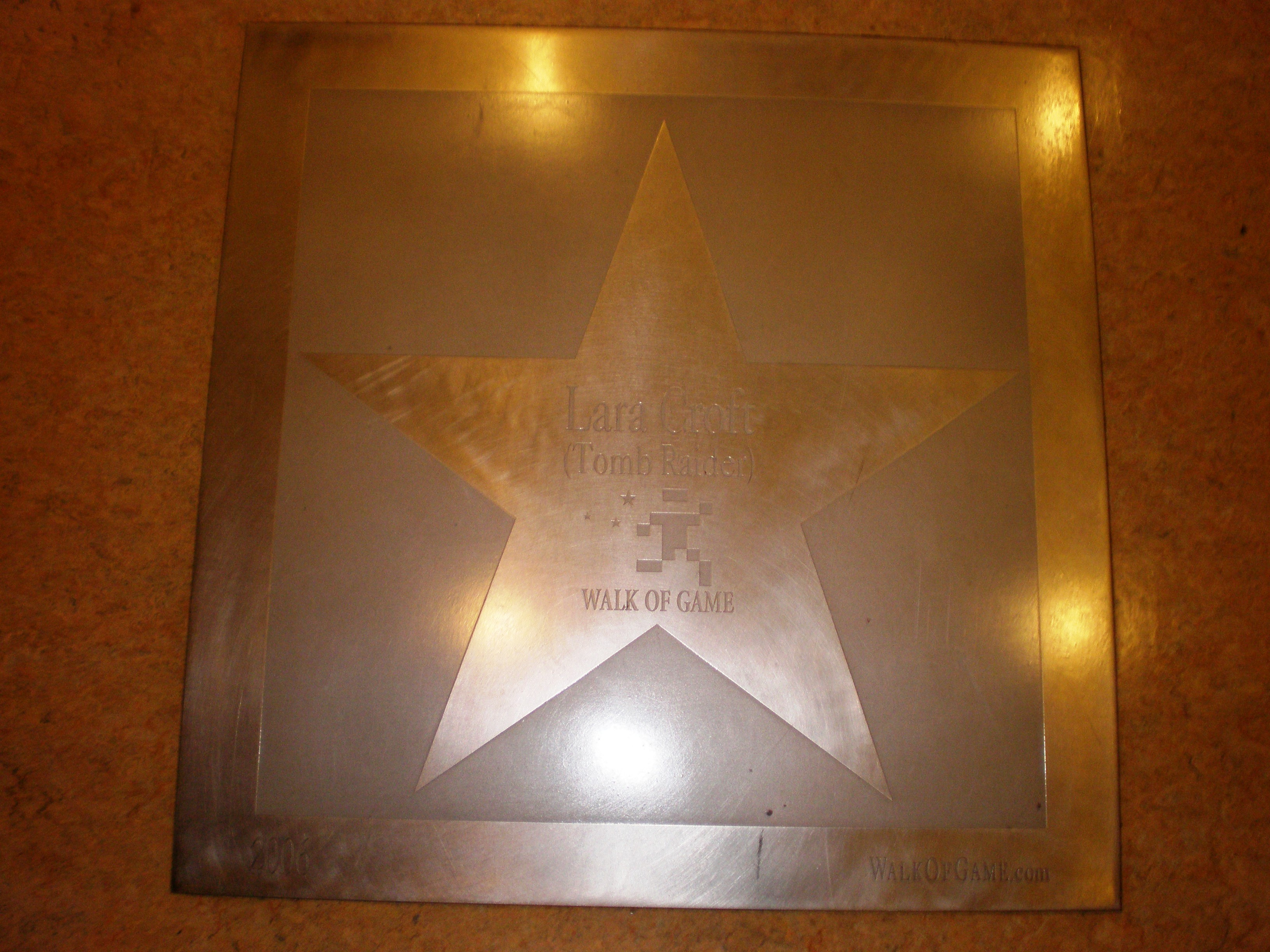
Lara Croft's star

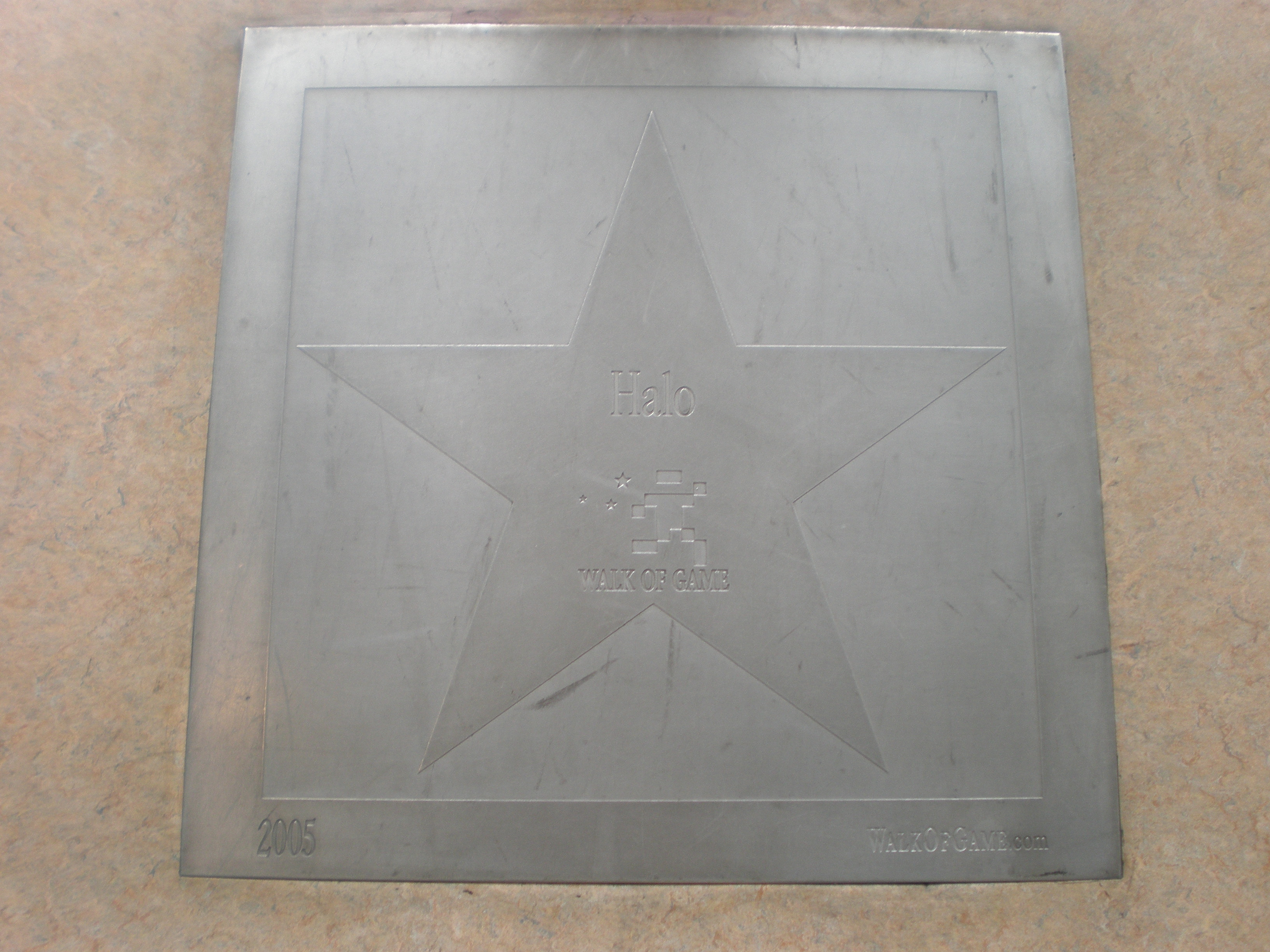
Halo's star

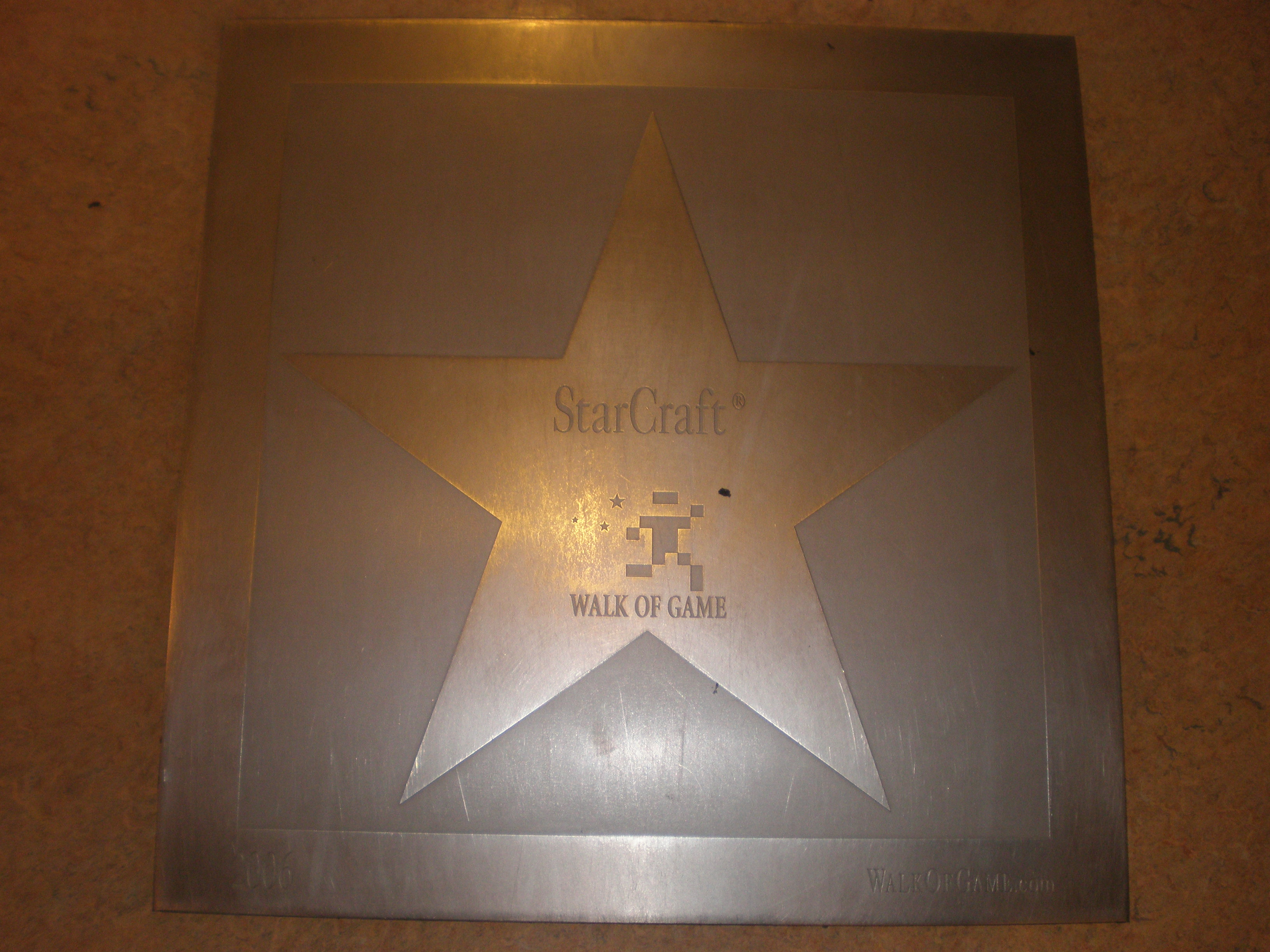
StarCraft's star

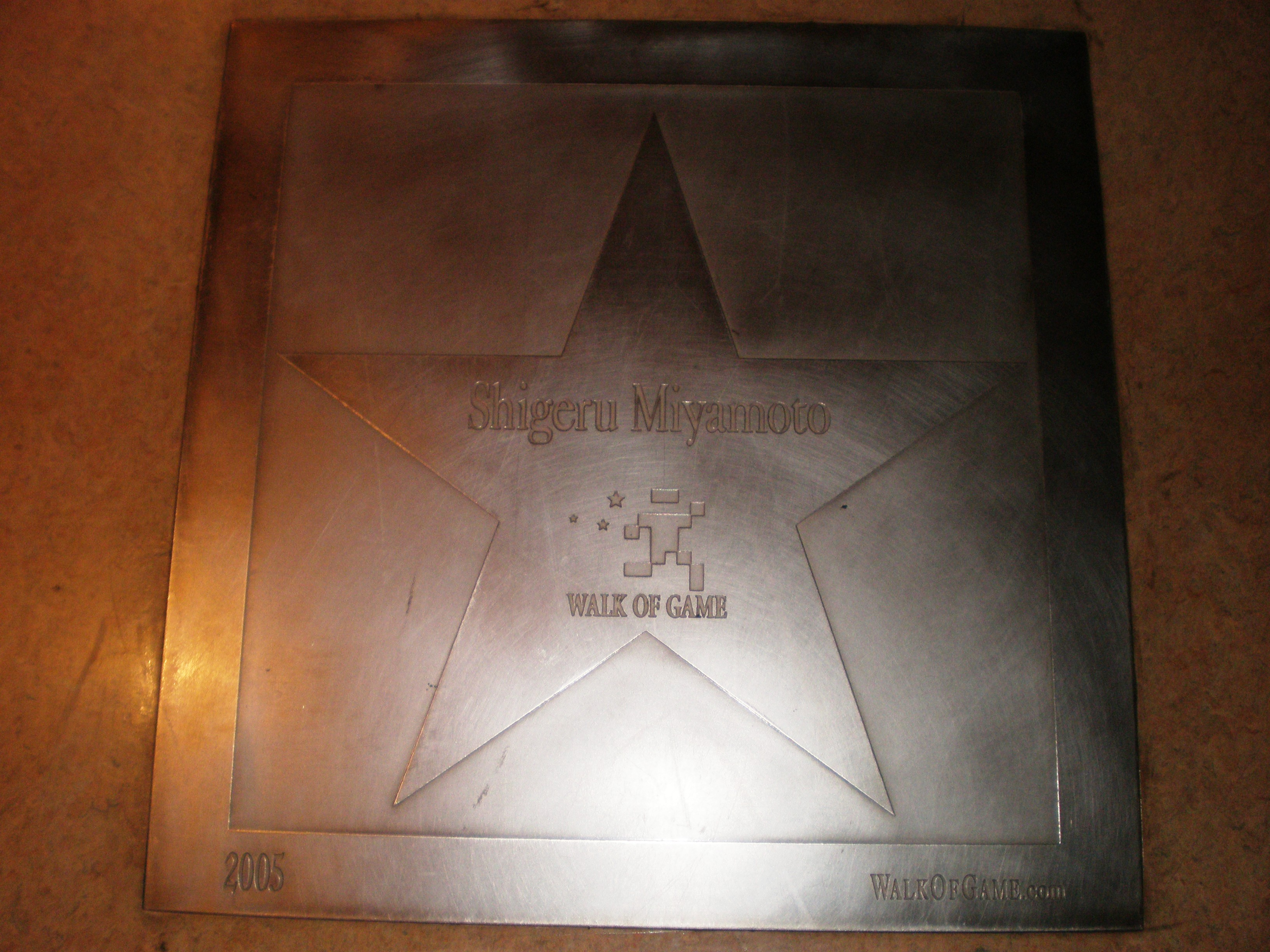
Shigeru Miyamoto's star

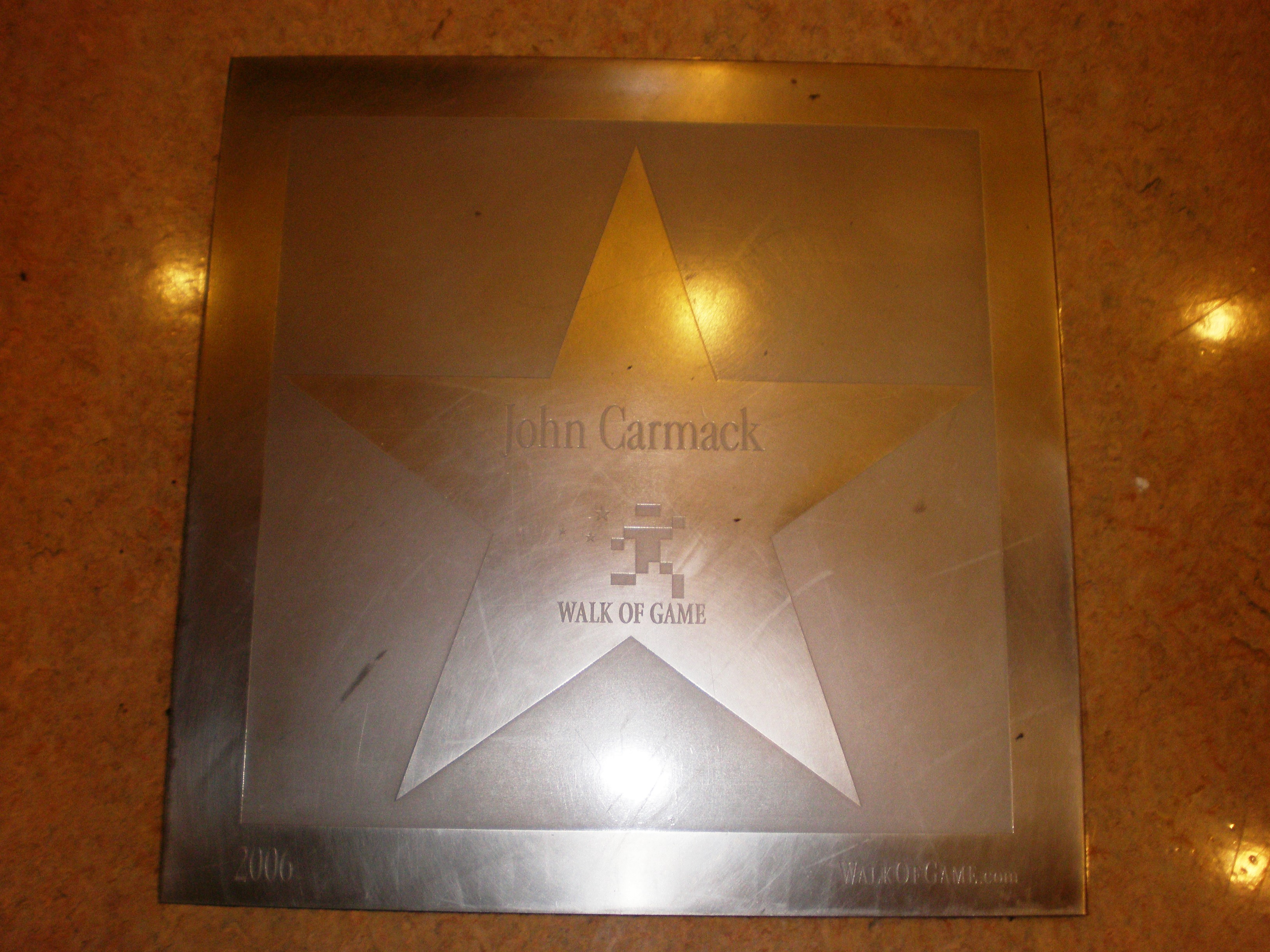
John Carmack's star

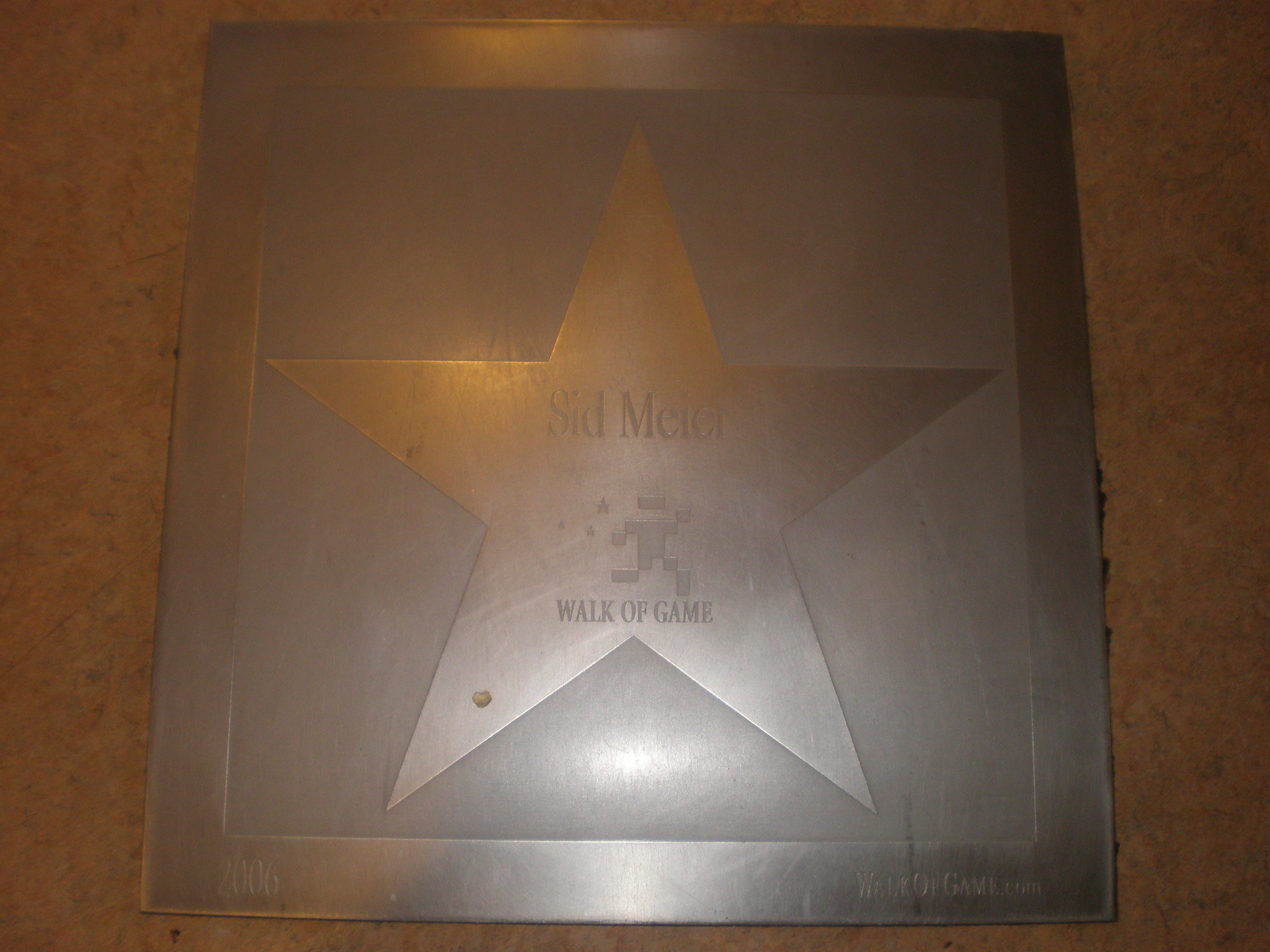
Sid Meier's star
