= StarCraft II: Wings of Liberty =

2010 real-time strategy video game

- StarCraft II: Wings of Liberty cover artwork, depicting protagonist Jim Raynor
- Developer: Blizzard Entertainment
- Publisher: Blizzard Entertainment
- Producer: Chris Sigaty
- Designer: Dustin Browder
- Programmers: Carl Chimes; Bob Fitch
- Artist: Samwise Didier
- Writers: Chris Metzen; Andy Chambers; Brian Kindregan
- Composers: Neal Acree; Russell Brower; Derek Duke; Glenn Stafford; Inon Zur
- Series: StarCraft
- Platforms: Microsoft Windows macOS
- Release: July 27, 2010
- Genre: Real-time strategy
- Modes: Single-player, multiplayer

StarCraft II: Wings of Liberty is a science fiction real-time strategy video game developed and published by Blizzard Entertainment. It was released worldwide in July 2010 for Microsoft Windows and Mac OS X. A sequel to the 1998 video game StarCraft and the Brood War expansion pack, the game is best known as the original installment of StarCraft II which was later followed by a number of expansion packs. Wings of Liberty has been free-to-play since November 2017.

Like its predecessor, the game revolves around three species: the Terrans (humans), the Zerg (a super-species of assimilated life forms), and the Protoss (a technologically advanced species with vast psionic powers). Wings of Liberty focuses on the Terrans, while the expansions, Heart of the Swarm and Legacy of the Void, would focus on the Zerg and Protoss, respectively. The game is set four years after the events of 1998's Brood War, and follows the exploits of Jim Raynor as he leads an insurgent group against the autocratic Terran Dominion. The game includes new and returning characters and locations from the original game.

The game was met with critical acclaim, receiving an aggregated score of 93% from Metacritic, and it has been cited as one of the greatest video games ever made. Similar to its predecessor, StarCraft II was praised for its engaging gameplay, as well as its introduction of new features and improved storytelling. The game was criticized for lacking features that existed in the original StarCraft game including LAN play and the ability to switch between multiplayer regions. At the time of its release, StarCraft II became the fastest-selling real-time strategy game, with over three million copies sold worldwide in the first month.

== Gameplay ==
The new Terran briefing system allows the player to explore the inside of the battlecruiser Hyperion.

StarCraft II: Wings of Liberty features the return of the three species from the original game: Protoss, Terran, and Zerg. In the Terran campaign, the original StarCraft briefing room is replaced with an interactive version of the battlecruiser Hyperion, with Jim Raynor, a bitter and hard-drinking mercenary captain, as the central character. In a departure from previous Blizzard games, the campaign is non-linear, with Raynor taking jobs for money and using that money to buy additional units and upgrades. Although each playthrough will vary, the result remains consistent, keeping the storyline linear. Blizzard's Vice President Rob Pardo stressed that each campaign will function very differently. The Terran campaign, Wings of Liberty, places players in a mercenary-style campaign, as Terran rebel group Raynor's Raiders raise funds by taking assignments from outside groups. The second release, Heart of the Swarm, is Zerg-focused and has role-playing elements. Sarah Kerrigan is the focus of the campaign, and the story revolves around the possibility of her redemption. The Protoss-themed Legacy of the Void is the third expansion, with the Protoss Artanis attempting to reunite the Protoss tribes in order to stop the resurrection of Amon, a fallen Xel'Naga.

Wings of Liberty has 29 playable campaign missions; 26 are playable in a single playthrough, three missions are choice-related alternates, and one hidden secret mission.

The Wings of Liberty campaign contains several missions with unique features, such as lava that floods the battlefield every five minutes, forcing the player to move their units to high ground before they are destroyed. In another mission, enemy units attack the player only at night, forcing the player into a form of siege warfare. In one mission, the player must use a single unit to influence the tide of an AI-controlled battle. Between missions, players can choose units, buildings, and upgrades that are not available in the multiplayer missions.

Wings of Liberty features approximately the same number of units as the original StarCraft. Some units from the original game have returned, some featuring new upgrades and abilities. For example, the Protoss Zealot, a melee unit from the original game, has the researchable ability to dash forward and quickly reach nearby enemies as a refinement of its speed upgrade from the original. Other units have been replaced or removed. Other changes to unit design have been inspired by story events in StarCraft and its expansion StarCraft: Brood War, replacing old units with new or renamed versions which sport different attributes and abilities. Units in StarCraft II have new abilities, compared to the original, that encourage more complex interaction with the game environment. Among these are the inclusion of units that can traverse varying levels of terrain, or have the ability to teleport short distances. Some Protoss units can be warped into pylon-powered areas using the Warp Gate, a slight modification of an existing building called the Gateway. StarCraft II's campaign has units that are only playable in the campaign and not in the regular multiplayer mode, though they are available for custom maps. These mostly consist of units that have been scrapped from development such as the Terran Diamondback as well as various returning units from the original StarCraft such as the Terran Wraith and Goliath. The campaign features hirable mercenaries, modified versions of certain units with enhanced attributes such as health or damage that become available for hire once the standard unit is unlocked.

=== Editor ===
The StarCraft II Editor is a campaign, map, and mod editor. It is the first editor by Blizzard to feature built-in mod creation and usage support. Updated art and data from the original StarCraft that were not used, along with models and data that were scrapped during the development process (including those made as April Fools jokes) will be available in the editor. Unlike previous editors made by Blizzard, it is the first to have Internet connectivity features such as map publishing, retrieval, and online activation of the editor client. Lead producer Chris Sigaty has stated that the editor gives players the ability to create role-playing, Hero-type units and structures resembling those from Warcraft III. At BlizzCon 2009, Blizzard demonstrated a build of the StarCraft II Editor showcasing its capabilities, such as the ability to customize the user interface. The final build includes a third-person style perspective for missions.

The editor was available for the first time during the phase 1 beta testing of StarCraft II, when it came with a patch. With the start of phase 2, the editor was updated. There is a map-making community using the editor, creating first-person shooter games, role-playing video games, tower defense, and multiplayer online battle arena-type games. The map database is updated as more map makers create mods for the community. The editor changes the way maps are distributed: rather than hosting games using local map files, users create and join games using maps that have been published to Battle.net. Map or mod uploads are limited to a total of 50 MB of storage, divided between ten files at most, with no file being larger than 10 MB. Although the StarCraft II Editor offers more features than the original StarCraft Editor in terms of game customization, there are concerns that the publishing limitations of Battle.net will not allow for large-scale custom maps or extensive map availability unless there is an external map publishing tool.

The StarCraft II Arcade is a major addition to the map-making community, where high quality maps may be sold for a small fee as "premium maps" over Battle.net. As a part of the arcade feature, a custom map called "Blizzard DOTA", which eventually became a standalone game named Heroes of the Storm, was announced alongside several other mods of Blizzard Entertainment at BlizzCon 2010. At that time, the map was developed to showcase the modding abilities that were to be added to StarCraft II.

=== LAN play ===
StarCraft II does not offer the ability to play directly over a local area network (LAN), as is possible with StarCraft; all network games are routed through the Internet via Blizzard's gaming servers. The latency delay between commands issued and game response when played online is greatly reduced when playing over a LAN and this allows for much finer control over in-game units; there were concerns that a professional scene would not develop as a result. Over 250,000 fans signed a petition asking Blizzard to add LAN play to StarCraft II, before the game's release. Currently, Blizzard has no plans to support LAN play. Although it does not change the routing of the game through Blizzard's servers, a 'Players Near You' feature was added in StarCraft II patch 2.0.4, to help with organizing games with other players on the same local network.

== Synopsis ==
=== Background ===
A Zerg colony gathering resources and expanding its military

The campaign storyline of StarCraft II takes place four years after StarCraft: Brood War, and features the return of Zeratul, Arcturus Mengsk, Artanis, Sarah Kerrigan, and Jim Raynor. It also features new characters such as Rory Swann and Tychus Findlay. In StarCraft II, players revisit familiar worlds, like Char, Mar Sara, and Tarsonis, as well as new locations, such as the jungle planet Bel'Shir and New Folsom. The Xel'Naga, an ancient space-faring race responsible for creating the Protoss and the Zerg, also play a major role in the story.

At the conclusion of Brood War, Kerrigan and her Zerg forces became the dominant faction in the Koprulu Sector, having annihilated the United Earth Directorate's Expeditionary Force, defeated the Terran Dominion, and invaded the Protoss homeworld of Aiur. However, after the conclusion of Brood War, Kerrigan retreats to Char, despite having more than enough power to crush all remaining resistance in the Koprulu Sector. In the four years leading up to the events of StarCraft II, she has not been seen or heard from by any of the other characters.

Arcturus Mengsk has been left to rebuild the Dominion, and is consolidating his power while fending off harassment from rival Terran groups. Mengsk has become power-hungry, declaring Jim Raynor an outlaw and showing little desire to protect or aid the colonies under his jurisdiction. Valerian Mengsk, a character introduced in the novel Firstborn, will play an important role in Dominion politics, due to his position as heir apparent to the throne. Meanwhile, Jim Raynor, whose role in the events of StarCraft and Brood War has been marginalized by the media under the Dominion's control, has become a mercenary who spends his free time drinking in Joeyray's Bar. Chris Metzen, Vice President of Creative Development at Blizzard, has emphasized that by the events of StarCraft II, Raynor has become jaded and embittered by the way he was used and betrayed by Arcturus Mengsk. Other new characters to the series include Tychus Findlay, an ex-convict and marine who becomes a member of Raynor's crew, and Matt Horner, Raynor's second in command, a character originally featured in the novel Queen of Blades.

Following the fall of Aiur and the death of the Dark Templar matriarch Raszagal, the Protoss have retreated to the Dark Templar homeworld of Shakuras. There, Artanis, a former student of Tassadar, is trying to unify the Khalai Protoss and the Dark Templar, who have nearly separated into warring tribes as a result of centuries of distrust. Zeratul, tormented over the murder of his matriarch, has disappeared to search for clues to the meaning of Samir Duran's cryptic statements regarding the Protoss/Zerg hybrids in Brood War's secret mission "Dark Origin".

=== Plot ===
Four years after the Brood War, the Dominion is once again the dominant Terran power in the Koprulu sector. News reports reveal that in the four years since the end of the Brood Wars, the standing Dominion military forces have been reduced and defense budget has instead been diverted to hunting down rebel forces that operate against the Dominion. For reasons unknown, Kerrigan gathered the swarm at Char and then vanished from sight. With the Zerg gone, the Protoss have once again taken a passive role in the galaxy. Jim Raynor has formed a revolutionary group named Raynor's Raiders in order to overthrow Dominion Emperor Arcturus Mengsk. On Mar Sara, Raynor meets with an old comrade, Tychus Findlay. Together, they liberate the local population from Dominion control and also discover a component of a mysterious Xel'Naga artifact. As the Zerg begin to overrun Mar Sara, Raynor arranges an evacuation to his battlecruiser, the Hyperion, captained by Matt Horner, Raynor's second-in-command.

With Tychus acting as the middleman, the Raiders embark on a series of missions to find the remaining pieces of the Xel'Naga artifact, which they sell to the enigmatic Moebius Foundation in order to fund their revolution. Along the way, they meet with Gabriel Tosh, a rogue Dominion psychic assassin known as a Spectre, and Ariel Hanson, a researcher on the Zerg and leader of a small farming colony. The Raiders perform missions to help Tosh procure the raw materials to train new Spectres as well as to aid Hanson as she attempts to secure her colonists who are caught between the Zerg infesting their planets and the Protoss attempting to eradicate the infestation. Horner also arranges a series of missions to undermine Mengsk, recovering intelligence information about his war crimes and broadcasting them across the Dominion. Finally, Zeratul sneaks aboard the Hyperion to deliver a psychic crystal that allows Raynor to share visions involving an ominous prophecy where Zerg-Protoss hybrids and an enslaved Zerg swarm wipe out Humanity and the Protoss. The vision reveals that only Kerrigan has the power to prevent the eradication of all life in the sector and beyond.

After collecting more artifact pieces, Raynor's forces encounter Dominion battleships at the pre-agreed Moebius Foundation rendezvous point. The Moebius Foundation is revealed to be under the control of Valerian Mengsk, Arcturus' son. Valerian, intending to show himself as a worthy successor to his father, asks Raynor to help him invade Char and use the artifact to restore Kerrigan's humanity, thus weakening the Zerg. To the initial dismay of the crew, Raynor agrees. With Valerian's aid, Raynor recovers the final artifact piece, and the Raiders and Dominion invade Char. The Dominion fleet is devastated by the heavy Zerg defenses, but Raynor secures a foothold on Char and rendezvouses with Dominion forces led by Horace Warfield, a decorated Dominion general. Warfield is later injured and appoints Raynor commander of surviving Dominion forces as well. The combined forces of the Raiders and Dominion military push towards the main Hive Cluster of the planet, protecting the artifact as it charges to full power, and the artifact eventually destroys all Zerg within its blast radius. Raynor's team finds Kerrigan restored to human form; however, Tychus reveals that he made a deal with Arcturus Mengsk, trading Kerrigan's life for his own freedom. Raynor defends Kerrigan from Tychus' attempt to kill her, fatally shooting Tychus with a bullet he intended to kill Mengsk with. The closing scene shows Raynor carrying Sarah Kerrigan out of the main hive in his arms.

=== Cast ===
The English language version of StarCraft II has Robert Clotworthy and James Harper reprising their roles from StarCraft as the voices of Jim Raynor and Arcturus Mengsk. Notable absences included Tricia Helfer replacing Glynnis Talken as Kerrigan, Michael Dorn replacing Michael Gough as Tassadar, and Fred Tatasciore filling in for the late Jack Ritschel as Zeratul. The voice director for the game was Andrea Romano. Over 58 voice actors were hired for the game, some of whom voiced multiple characters.

== Development ==
The development of StarCraft II was announced on May 19, 2007, at the Blizzard Worldwide Invitational in Seoul, South Korea. According to Rob Pardo and Chris Sigaty, development on the game, though initially delayed for a year by the temporary reassignment of Blizzard's resources to World of Warcraft, began in 2003, shortly after Warcraft III: The Frozen Throne was released. StarCraft II supports the DirectX 9 (Pixel shader 2.0) software, and it is also fully compatible with DirectX 10 as well. The development team had decided not to add exclusive DirectX 10 graphic effects. The Mac version uses OpenGL. The game previously featured the Havok physics engine, which allowed for more realistic environmental elements such as "debris rolling down a ramp" which has since been replaced with a custom physics engine.

At the June 2008 Blizzard Worldwide Invitational, Blizzard Executive Vice President Rob Pardo announced that development of the single-player campaign was approximately one-third complete, as well as that Wings of Liberty would be followed up by two expansion packs – StarCraft II: Heart of the Swarm, which would focus around the Zerg and StarCraft II: Legacy of the Void, which would focus around the Protoss. On February 25, 2009, Blizzard announced the Blizzard Theme Park Contest, where prizes would include two beta keys for StarCraft II. The updated news and updates page of Battle.net for Warcraft III: The Frozen Throne stated that the top 20 players from each realm was to be given a StarCraft II beta key.

Blizzard posted a release date for the game's first beta of Summer 2009, but failed to release a beta during that time. Since May 6, 2009, it was possible to sign up for the beta phase of the game. In November 2009, the game's producer Chris Sigaty confirmed there would be no public beta for the game taking place in 2009 but assured fans that it would happen next year. In February 2010, Blizzard CEO Mike Morhaime announced that a closed beta would open later that month. On February 17, 2010, StarCraft II began closed beta testing, as promised. The beta was expected to last for 3–5 months. Beta keys for the initial release were sold on eBay for prices as high as $400. Blizzard also released a map editor for the beta as part of Patch 9. According to the company, they had planned to release a major content patch towards the end of beta testing. As of July 23, 2010, eighteen patches had been released for the beta (only seventeen on European servers), including a patch which provided access to the Galaxy map editor. On May 12, 2010, Blizzard released the beta client for computers running Mac OS X, for the users who had signed up. On May 17, 2010, Blizzard announced that the first phase of the beta test would be coming to an end in all regions on May 31, but it was later extended to June 7. The second phase began on July 7, 2010, and ended on July 19, 2010.

In an interview held in June 2009, Rob Pardo indicated that LAN support would not be included in StarCraft II. Removing LAN requires players to connect through Blizzard's servers before being able to play multiplayer games, causing gamers to voice their dissatisfaction online. Further controversy was sparked when Blizzard confirmed that the game would not support cross-server play out of the box, restricting gamers to only play against local opponents—for instance, US gamers against those in the US and Europeans against Europeans. The company originally explained that Australia and New Zealand servers would be located in Southeast Asia, pitting them against combatants from Indonesia, the Philippines, Malaysia, Singapore, and Thailand. However, starting from patch 1.1.0, it was announced that the Southeast Asia/Australia/New Zealand version of the game would not be strictly region-locked, with gamers able to play on both the SEA/ANZ servers and the North American ones.

Mike Morhaime, president of Blizzard, announced during the opening ceremony of Blizzcon 2009 that StarCraft II and the new Battle.net platform would both be released in 2010, with an approximately one-month gap between releases. As of March 2010, Blizzard had stated that the new platform was being tested outside the beta and was planned for release in early July 2010, for both StarCraft II and World of Warcraft: Cataclysm, with a later upgrade for Diablo III. On May 5, 2010, it was revealed that StarCraft II and Battle.net 2.0 would be integrated with social networking site Facebook, "linking the world's premier online gaming platform with the world's most popular social platform"—a move that allowed gamers to search among their Facebook friends for StarCraft II opponents. Wired magazine, in its annual Vaporware Award, ranked StarCraft II first among the delayed technology products of 2009. StarCraft II was finally released on July 27, 2010, with launch parties in selected cities of countries around the world. Customers and reviewers who received the installation DVD before the July 27 release were greeted with an error screen, telling them to wait until the release date. There was no known workaround and some reviewers had praised the action for limiting journalists to playing and reviewing the game with the rest of the public.

Compared to the original StarCraft, StarCraft II was designed to focus more heavily on the multiplayer aspect, with changes that included major improvements to Battle.net, a new competitive "ladder" system for ranked games, and new matchmaking mechanics that were designed to "match-up" players of equal skill level. In addition, the replay function, which allows players to record and review past games, was improved. Blizzard also stated that they incorporated changes to the game that were suggested by fans. StarCraft II continues its predecessor's use of pre-rendered cinematic cut scenes to advance the plot while also improving the quality of in-game cut scenes within the levels themselves, which are rendered on-the-fly using the same game engine as the graphics in the game proper. Blizzard stated that, with the new graphics engine that StarCraft II uses to render the gameplay, they "can actually create in-game cut-scenes of near-cinematic quality". Improvements include advanced scenery allocation and more detailed space terrain, such as floating space platforms with planets and asteroids in the background. Small cliffs, extensions, and advertising signs were shown to have been improved and refined.

During BlizzCon 2017, it was announced that StarCraft II would be re-branded as a "free-to-play" game going forward, at least in part. This unlocked the Wings of Liberty single-player campaign, multiplayer mode, and two other game modes for everyone. This change followed the introduction of microtransaction based content, including cosmetic unit skins, co-op commanders, and mission packs. This content was produced until October 2020.

=== Expansions ===
During the development of StarCraft II, it was announced that the game and its expansions would form a trilogy; each chapter would feature one of the three playable races. The first expansion focuses on the Zerg race; Heart of the Swarm was released on March 12, 2013. The second expansion Legacy of the Void, which centers on the Protoss race, was released on November 10, 2015. An additional single-player campaign called StarCraft II: Nova Covert Ops was released in 2016 in three episodes. This as downloadable content (DLC) focuses on a Terran special ops character called Nova Terra.

== Release ==
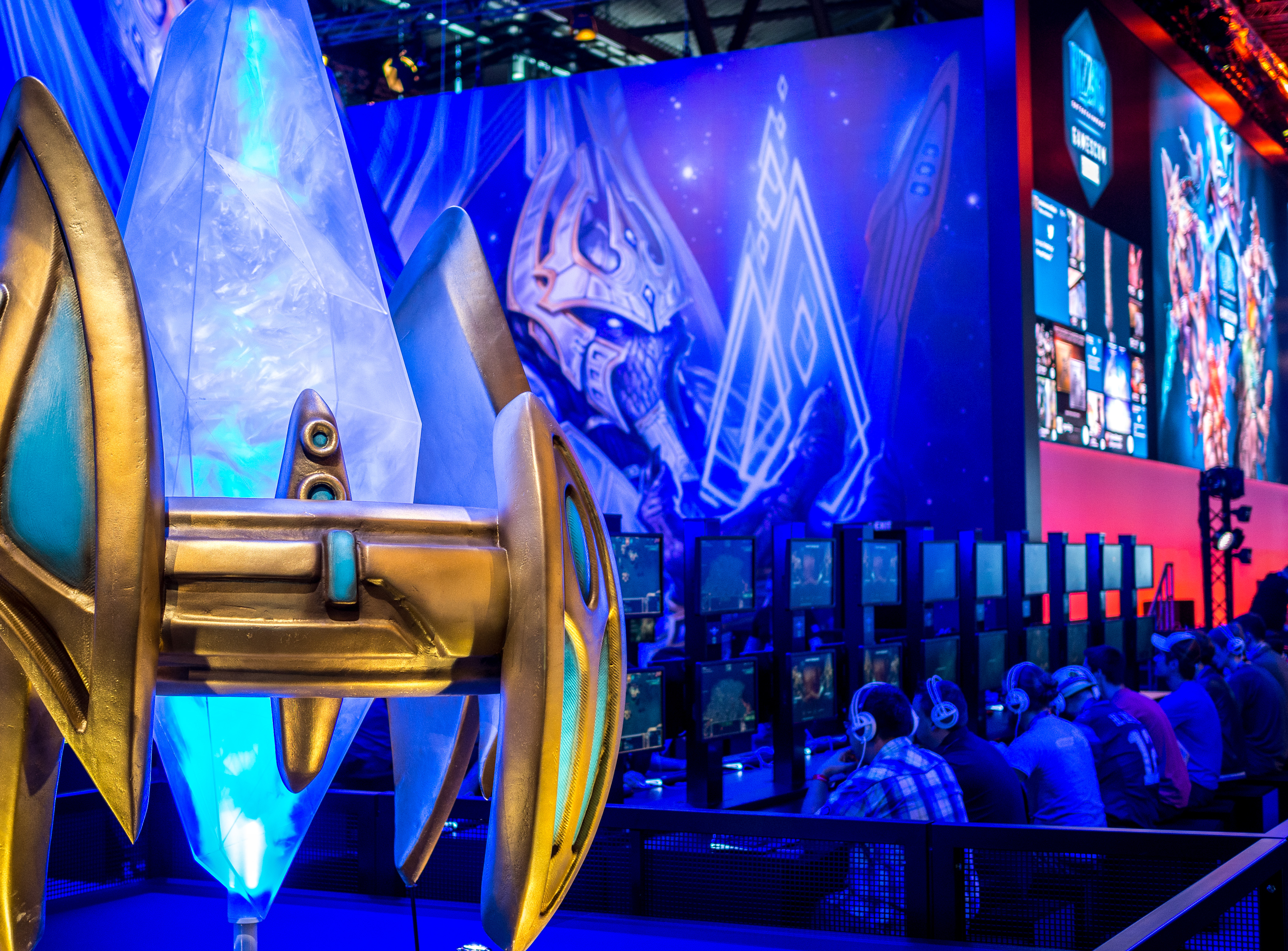
StarCraft II at Gamescom 2015

=== Versions ===
On April 8, 2010, Blizzard announced that the game would be available in a standard and collector's edition. The game was made available for digital download from Blizzard on the release date; pre-loading began on July 15. The collector's edition comes with an artbook, 2 GB flash drive modeled after Jim Raynor's dog tag with the original StarCraft and Brood War expansion preloaded, behind-the-scenes DVD, soundtrack, comic book, unique avatar portraits, a unique model for the in-game Thor unit in multiplayer, and a World of Warcraft pet.

On June 24, 2010, at a press-only Korean event, Blizzard announced that Korean players would be able to play StarCraft II for free with an active World of Warcraft subscription. In PC bangs, or other cybercafés, players can play the game by paying 500 to 1500 South Korean won (approx. $0.50 to $1.50) per hour. Other options include a 30-day subscription for ₩9900 (approx. $8), a 24 hours play-time ticket for ₩2000 (approx. $1.50), and unlimited access for ₩69,000 (approx. $56).

On August 3, 2011, Blizzard replaced the previously available StarCraft II demo with the new StarCraft II: Starter Edition. It allows anyone to play part of the game for free and it comes as a 7 GB package downloaded using the Blizzard Downloader client. The Starter Edition is available for Mac and Windows, and requires a Battle.net account and an Internet connection to play.

=== Technical difficulties ===
Several gaming and technology sites reported an "overheating bug" with StarCraft II that in some cases resulted in permanent damage to video cards. The source of the problem is the fact that the frame rate is not locked on menu screens. This causes the graphics card to continuously render the image, resulting in excessive heat. Blizzard has acknowledged the problem, and posted a temporary workaround. They also recommended ensuring computer systems are well ventilated and contacting the videocard manufacturer for hardware-related issues. In response to the reports, Blizzard's Public Relations Manager, Bob Colayco said: "There is no code in our software that will cause video cards to overheat. When we saw this issue first reported, we conducted thorough additional testing and determined that for those players experiencing this problem, the cause is most likely hardware-related." CrunchGear has also suggested that the problem is not with StarCraft II, but rather due to poorly maintained hardware and inadequate cooling. They do however agree that the overheating only occurs on non-framerate locked screens and provide the fix that Blizzard has offered to users. Other articles recommend that users regularly clean the dust out of their computer to improve the cooling efficiency of their systems. Blizzard posted a message on their forums regarding the issue that has since been removed. The message was: "Screens that are light on detail may make your system overheat if cooling is overall insufficient. This is because the game has nothing to do so it is primarily just working on drawing the screen very quickly."

=== Soundtracks ===
StarCraft II: Wings of Liberty Soundtrack

Soundtrack album by Russell Brower, Glenn Stafford, Derek Duke, Neal Acree, Sascha Dikiciyan & Cris Velasco
- Released: July 27, 2010
- Genre: Video game soundtrack
- Length: 67:12
- Label: Azeroth Music

Two soundtracks were released for StarCraft II: Wings of Liberty. The original score containing 14 tracks, composed by Derek Duke, Glenn Stafford, Neal Acree, Russell Brower, Sascha Dikiciyan and Cris Velasco was released on CD as part of the Collector's Edition, as well as on the iTunes Store. A second soundtrack, Revolution Overdrive: Songs of Liberty, was released on CD, vinyl and iTunes. This soundtrack features the original and cover songs heard in JoeyRay's bar during the game.

== Professional competition ==
StarCraft II: Wings of Liberty was played professionally throughout the world, though much like its predecessor StarCraft: Brood War's professional competition, the highest level of play has historically been centered in South Korea. The game was widely considered the largest esport in the world during its early years and has been credited as bringing esports to the rest of the world in the way the original brought it to South Korea.

In 2012, the StarCraft II World Championship Series (WCS) was created as Blizzard's primary sanctioned StarCraft II tournament circuit.

== Reception ==
StarCraft II: Wings of Liberty

Aggregate scores
Aggregator	Score
GameRankings	92.39%
Metacritic	93/100

Review scores
Publication	Score
Computer and Video Games	9.3/10
Eurogamer	9/10
Game Informer	10/10
GameRevolution	B+
GameSpot	9.5/10
GameSpy	4/5
GamesRadar+	10/10
GameTrailers	9.5/10
Giant Bomb	5/5
IGN	9/10
Joystiq	5/5
VideoGamer.com	10/10
X-Play	5/5
NZGamer.com	9.8/10
Softpedia	9/10

StarCraft II: Wings of Liberty has been met with critical acclaim since its release. It received an aggregated score of 92.39% at GameRankings and 93/100 at Metacritic. The game was particularly praised for retaining the popular RTS gameplay from StarCraft, while introducing new features and improved storytelling. GamesRadar felt that "in many ways, StarCraft II: Wings of Liberty feels like StarCraft 2.0 – and that’s a good thing", stating that it "delivers on all fronts". NZGamer.com said the game was "the best RTS game released in years and one of the best games on PC". In relation to its story, GameTrailers stated, "If there's anything immediately apparent from Wings of Liberty's story, it's that the series' narrative structure has evolved well beyond the original's sparse between-sortie intermissions," calling it "an epic and entertainingly told yarn", while Eurogamer criticized the dialogue as being "flat" and the characters as being "either clichéd, banal or both". Giant Bomb echoed this view while also noting the Hyperion portion between missions, finding it to have "more depth of character, more believable pathos, more surprise twists—than I honestly expected out of the story". IGN however noted that "no doubt franchise fans will eat it up, but newcomers may be wondering what all the fuss is about while going through the early missions that lack the kind of urgency you would hope when the fate of civilization is in peril."

Joystiq was very positive towards the improved multiplayer matchmaking service, calling it "similar to Xbox Live and PlayStation Network, which is a welcome change from the archaic matchmaking of Battle.net in previous Blizzard games", while GameSpot called the amount of online content "remarkable", noting the variety of maps and up to 12 player online support. When comparing the single and multiplayer modes, GameSpy felt that the single-player portion was "less inspiring, mostly because of the extremely shallow learning curve", with the online multiplayer being "so smooth, so challenging, and so much plain-old-fun". John Meyer of Wired praised the improved graphics engine, saying that it "shows decades of polish" and a "slick new presentation". Matt Peckham of PC World also noted that some buyers expressed dissatisfaction with the absence of LAN-based multiplayer gameplay, the lack of cross-realm play and the campaign being limited to the Terran race. Game Revolution, in relation to only being able to play the Terran campaign, however, pointed out that "Wings of Liberty has 29 missions; the original StarCraft had just over 30. Fair odds say the next one will have roughly the same amount; Broodwar brought about 30 too. We already got the full game for $50, and we’re getting offered two expansions. If you want to feel outraged about something, pick something else."

Ars Technica gave the overall game a verdict of "buy" and especially praised the single-player campaign as "fun as hell". They were also very impressed with the game modding tools that allow users to create their own content and distribute it to other fans. The two "ugly" issues they identified with the game were lack of LAN play and the decision to split up the regions. They suggested that these decisions were influenced by Activision rather than by the game designers at Blizzard, and felt that this would turn many people off of the game and make things difficult for people who have international friends. In a separate article, Ars Technica vigorously supported StarCraft II against a series of 1-star ratings given to the game on Amazon.com in protest against the lack of LAN play. They argued in Blizzard's defense against complaints that it was not a full game because only the Terran campaign was released, but did suggest that the customers' complaints about the lack of LAN and cross-region play were legitimate. Public Knowledge criticized the end-user license agreement (EULA) for StarCraft II, commenting on how the altered EULA may affect multiplayer tournaments not endorsed by Blizzard.

During the 14th Annual Interactive Achievement Awards, the Academy of Interactive Arts & Sciences awarded StarCraft II with "Strategy/Simulation Game of the Year" and "Outstanding Achievement in Online Gameplay"; it also received nominations for "Outstanding Achievement in Original Music Composition" and "Outstanding Character Performance" (Neil Kaplan's vocal portrayal of Tychus Findlay).

In August 2016, StarCraft II: Wings of Liberty placed 26th on Time's The 50 Best Video Games of All Time list.

=== Sales ===
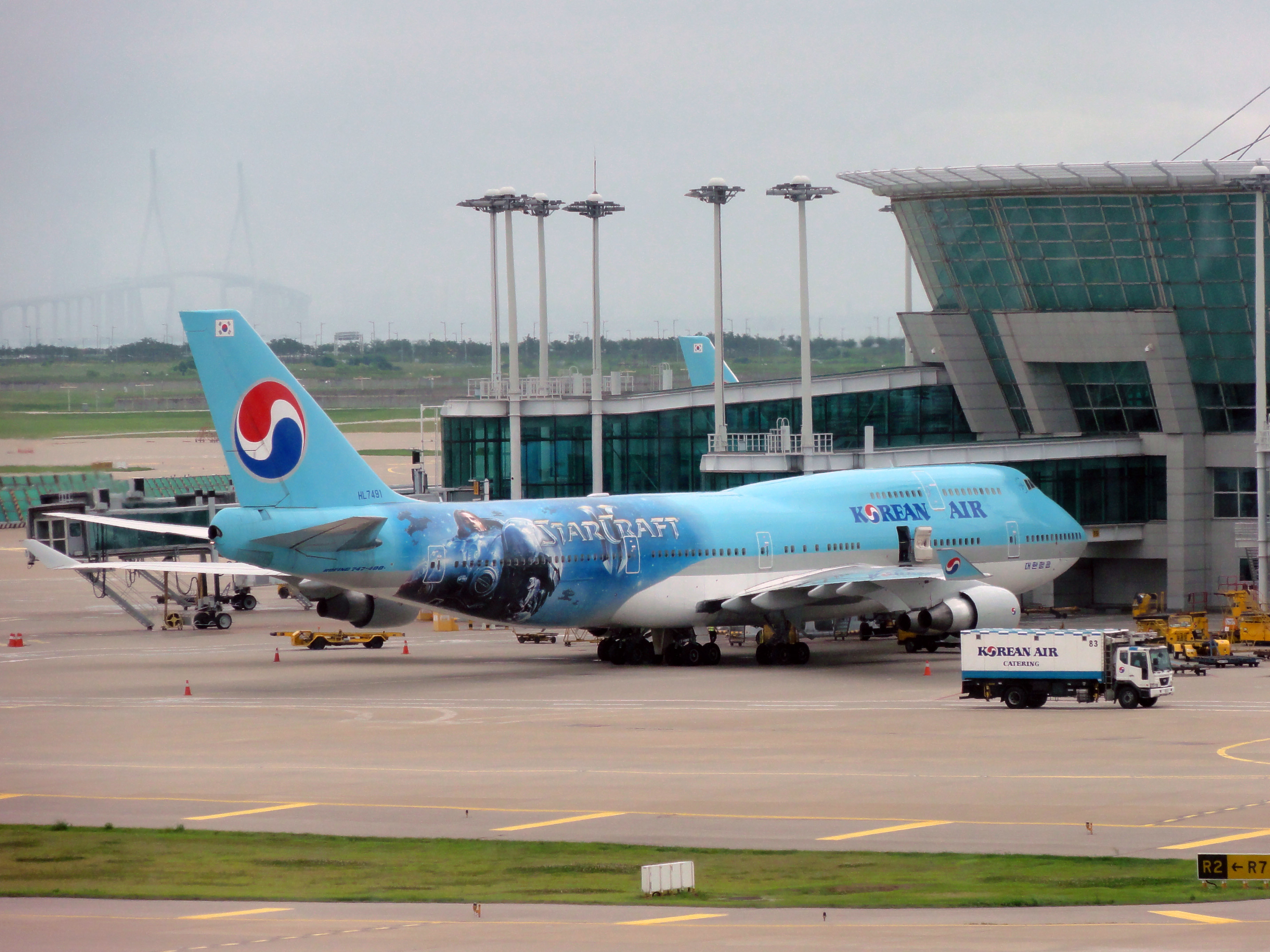
A Korean Air Boeing 747-400 at Incheon International Airport with an advertisement for StarCraft II painted on the fuselage. Jim Raynor is prominently displayed on the plane.

Blizzard entered into a co-marketing agreement with Korean Air that lasted for six months, in which two of the airline's airplanes on both domestic and international routes prominently displayed StarCraft II advertising featuring Jim Raynor on the fuselage. On August 3, 2010, Blizzard announced that StarCraft II sold more than one million units worldwide within one day of its release. After two days, when Blizzard began selling the game as a digital download on its website, approximately 500,000 additional units of the game were sold, bringing the total up to 1.5 million worldwide and making it the fastest-selling strategy game of all time. In its first month on sale, StarCraft II sold a total of three million copies worldwide. As of December 2010, the game has sold nearly 4.5 million units. The game was also heavily pirated, reportedly being downloaded over 2.3 million times, and setting a record for most data transferred by a single torrent in only three months.
