= Sarah Kerrigan =

Fictional character in StarCraft franchise

Sarah Louise Kerrigan Queen of Blades
- StarCraft character
- Kerrigan's infested appearance in StarCraft: Queen of Blades
- First game: StarCraft (1998)
- Created by: Chris Metzen; James Phinney
- Designed by: Chris Metzen; Samwise Didier; Glen Ran
- Voiced by: Glynnis Talken Campbell; Tricia Helfer (SC2); Vanessa Marshall (HotS)

In-universe information
- Nickname: Queen of Blades

Sarah Louise Kerrigan, the self-styled Queen of Blades, is a character in Blizzard Entertainment's StarCraft franchise. She was created by Chris Metzen and James Phinney, and her original appearance was designed by Metzen. Sarah Kerrigan is voiced by Glynnis Talken Campbell in StarCraft and Brood War, Tricia Helfer in StarCraft II: Wings of Liberty, Heart of the Swarm and Legacy of the Void, and Vanessa Marshall in Heroes of the Storm.

Kerrigan first appears in StarCraft as a twenty-six-year-old Ghost, a psychic trained both physically and mentally as an expert espionage agent and assassin. Initially the second-in-command of Sons of Korhal, a revolutionary movement against the oppressive Confederacy of Man, she is captured by the insectoid Zerg and genetically mutated into a human/Zerg hybrid ("infested" in series lore) completely under the control of the Zerg Overmind. Initially one of the Zerg's most powerful agents, she gains control of the Zerg after the destruction of the Overmind, and seeks dominance over the galaxy. Kerrigan's life before her mutation is further explored in the StarCraft novels Uprising and Liberty's Crusade, while Queen of Blades elaborates on her infested persona.

As one of the major characters of the series, Kerrigan has been critically praised by video game journalists for her believability and character depth, and is frequently featured in lists of the top video game women, villains and characters in general. Her reception in regards to gender representation in video games has been more mixed. She has been considered to challenge some hetero-normative gender roles while adhering to others, and to also have an overly sexualized design.

== Character design ==
The character of Kerrigan was created by Blizzard Entertainment's Chris Metzen and James Phinney, with her physical appearance designed by Metzen. Though only meant to appear in a single level, her character grew on the developers, who ultimately designed a far greater role as the "Queen of Blades" that would evolve into the greatest agent of the Zerg Overmind. Amid a rivalry between Blizzard and Westwood Studios, Kerrigan was named after figure skater Nancy Kerrigan, known for her feud with Tonya Harding, as a reference to the character Tanya Adams in Command & Conquer: Red Alert.

In an interview Glynnis Talken Campbell, Kerrigan's voice actress from Starcraft and StarCraft: Brood War, described Kerrigan's change in personality during her infestation as "going from good girl to bad girl", and has said it was more of a change in personality than voice when providing her voice work. Kerrigan's voice also consisted of many grunts, growls and screams, and her unique infested voice was provided by doubling up Campbell's voice. She has also claimed that, were she to pen a StarCraft film or novel, she would rather have Kerrigan's relationship with Jim Raynor—the series' primary male protagonist—portrayed as one of admiration, sacrifice, and "them saving each other's butts" than actual romance due to StarCraft's action-oriented nature. While Campbell expressed interest in returning to voice the character in StarCraft II, and even voiced Kerrigan in the trailer for the game, she confirmed in February 2009 that she would not be reprising the role. Campbell stated that her work in the trailer was considered an audition of sorts and that Blizzard had decided to go in a different direction. Tricia Helfer replaced her, voicing Kerrigan in StarCraft II: Wings of Liberty as well as the expansions Heart of the Swarm and Legacy of the Void. The third actress to voice Kerrigan was Vanessa Marshall in the 2015 crossover video game Heroes of the Storm.

=== Personality ===
Having been conscripted into the Confederate Ghost program as a child due to her psychic potential, Kerrigan is described in the manual for StarCraft as never having been given the chance for a normal life. Her rigorous training and the use of neural implants to control her mental abilities leave her withdrawn and introverted. Despite this, Kerrigan exhibits qualities of courage and daring, and is an effective tactician. She is also described as a moral character, exemplified in her opposition to Arcturus Mengsk using the Zerg against the Confederacy. However, after her transformation by the Zerg, Kerrigan is freed from her inhibitions—as well as her neural conditioning—and indulges her darker traits (though Heart of the Swarm implies that at least part of her villainy was due to the influence of a fallen Xel'naga named Amon). Her attitude, combined with her natural intelligence, makes her extremely calculating and manipulative. A hint of her former moral sensitivity is noticeable when towards the end of the Zerg campaign of Brood War, she states how she feels weary of slaughter for the first time since her transformation. Kerrigan has also become far more physically aggressive, relishing close quarters combat so much that at one point in the novel Queen of Blades, she begins absent-mindedly licking the blood of her victims from her fingers.

One of the core elements of Kerrigan's personality is that of her manipulation by others, and her lack of identity. Her reversion to human form by Raynor allowed her to finally develop an identity for herself, though found her emotions torn between a man that she loved (Raynor) and a man that she despised (Mengsk).

== Depiction ==
Prior to her infestation, Kerrigan is described as being a graceful and deadly woman, exceedingly agile and athletic, possessing jade-green eyes and brilliant red hair usually worn as a ponytail. The novel Queen of Blades describes her facial features as being too strong to be classified as beautiful, but instead as striking and completely fitting for her personality. Kerrigan is rarely seen out of her armor, a form-fitting hostile environment suit specifically designed for Ghost operatives and equipped with a personal cloaking device. When off-duty, she is described as wearing casual clothing and always being equipped with at least a combat knife.

Kerrigan's infestation by the Zerg signaled a major overhaul for her appearance. Despite maintaining her stature, build, and facial features, she is described in Queen of Blades as having mottled green skin, covered in a glossy protective carapace. Kerrigan's eyes are bright yellow as opposed to her natural green, and her hair has transformed into stalks, described as being segmented like an insect's legs. Kerrigan's fingers are stated to now contain extendible claws. A pair of skeletal wings has also grown from her back, consisting of elongated segmented spikes that reach down to the level of her knees. Kerrigan is seen using these wings as a melee weapon, tearing opponents apart.

Kerrigan ascended into Xel'naga form by consuming the essence of Ouros, the last remaining Xel'naga, marking a complete overhaul for her appearance. Her physique resembles that of her human form, though her skin turns a metallic gold color with flames along the surface, and she has a pair of angelic wings. Kerrigans final canon appearance is in the Legacy of the Void epilogue cutscene, where she is shown to have returned to her human form.

== Appearances ==
=== In StarCraft ===
Sarah Kerrigan appears in StarCraft (1998) halfway through the first chapter of the game. She and Confederate officer Jim Raynor are tasked by Arcturus Mengsk, the leader of the militant rebel group Sons of Korhal, with starting a revolution on the fringe colony world of Antiga Prime by assassinating the presiding officers of the ruling Confederacy of Man. In response, the Confederacy blockades the planet as the insectoid Zerg Swarm begin to invade the surface, and Mengsk orders Kerrigan, against her wishes, to plant a psi emitter—stolen Confederate technology that attracts Zerg to it—to lure the Zerg into breaking the blockade, allowing the Sons of Korhal to escape. The Sons of Korhal then directly attack the Confederate capital world Tarsonis. During the attack, Mengsk, without consulting his officers, uses the psi emitters to ensure the complete destruction of the planet by the Zerg. The Zerg are subsequently attacked by the Protoss, a race of psionic aliens who attempt to stop further Zerg advancement and conquest. Kerrigan is sent with a detachment of troops to stop the Protoss from interfering with the Zerg rampage, but her position is overrun by the Zerg, and Mengsk refuses to rescue her as punishment for questioning his orders. Raynor deserts Mengsk in disgust, and Kerrigan is presumed dead.

However, as the second chapter begins, the player is charged by the Zerg hive mind, the Overmind, to protect a chrysalis on the planet Char. When the chrysalis hatches, it reveals Kerrigan has been infested with Zerg DNA, making her a powerful Zerg and Terran hybrid. In addition to her radically altered appearance, her personality has drastically shifted, putting her in allegiance with the Zerg. Raynor, drawn to Char by psychic dreams cast by Kerrigan during her incubation, fails in an attempt to rescue her, but is spared as Kerrigan, who is now aligned with the Zerg, does not see him as a threat. After breaking into a Terran science vessel, Kerrigan is able to sense the presence of the Protoss fleet commander Tassadar on Char. Tassadar diverts Kerrigan's attention long enough for his companion Zeratul to assassinate Zasz, one of the Zerg commanders. However, through a temporary mental connection, the Overmind is able to use Zeratul's memories to locate the Protoss homeworld of Aiur. The Overmind immediately launches the bulk of the Zerg Swarm to invade the planet, although Kerrigan remains behind on Char to hunt down Tassadar and Zeratul.

=== In StarCraft: Brood War ===
Following the Overmind's death at the hands of Tassadar in the conclusion of StarCraft, Kerrigan regains her independence from the Zerg hive mind and dedicates her efforts to becoming the leader of the Zerg Swarm. She presents herself on the Protoss colony world Shakuras, where she informs Zeratul and the Protoss of a new Overmind growing on Char, manipulating them into destroying Zerg forces running rival to her goals. She also gains an ally in Samir Duran, an apparently infested ex-Confederate Ghost who infiltrates the newly arrived forces of the United Earth Directorate (UED), and attempts to sabotage their mission to enslave the Zerg. The UED is successful in capturing the new Overmind, and Kerrigan exploits the threat of the UED to forge an alliance with Mengsk, Raynor and his new Protoss allies, turning around the war against the UED. However, Kerrigan quickly betrays this alliance and strikes at the armies of Raynor and Mengsk, heavily damaging both groups. Accompanied by Duran, Kerrigan returns to Shakuras to abduct the Protoss leader Raszagal, using her to blackmail Zeratul into killing the new Overmind on Char, after which all Zerg fall under Kerrigan's control. Zeratul attempts to rescue Raszagal, but kills her when he realizes her mind has been destroyed by Kerrigan's brainwashing. Kerrigan, surprised by his actions, allows him to live. Soon after, Kerrigan's position on Char is attacked by a vengeful Protoss fleet, the remnants of the UED's invasion force and a mercenary fleet commanded by Mengsk. Despite being outnumbered, Kerrigan's forces prevail, crippling her enemies and eradicating the UED fleet, thereby securing a dominant position in the sector.

=== In StarCraft II: Wings of Liberty ===
Kerrigan returns in StarCraft II: Wings of Liberty (2010). At BlizzCon 2007, Chris Metzen explained that in the years after Brood War, Kerrigan relocated to Char, pulling back most of the Zerg, and has since been quiet. She has the power to wipe out all her enemies but has not, creating a tense state of peace in the sector. Metzen also indicated an interest in exploring if there was any humanity left in Kerrigan or if she is beyond redemption in her current state. He revealed that Kerrigan's withdrawal has little to do with any suspicion she has of Duran, who is revealed towards the end of Brood War to be conducting secret experiments on creating a Protoss/Zerg hybrid; she does not know much about him, but in the time after Brood War, she is beginning to piece together the puzzle surrounding his motives. At BlizzCon 2008, Kerrigan made two brief appearances in cinematic trailers, one during an attack on a Terran city that was captured on video, and again in a series of caverns where Zeratul was studying ancient runes; in the latter, Kerrigan implies she has been waiting for his arrival.

In StarCraft II, Kerrigan launches an attack on the Terran Dominion colonies, in pursuit of various pieces of a Xel'naga artifact. Coincidentally, Jim Raynor is also pursuing these artifacts under the employment of a secretive group called the Moebius Foundation. Raynor's forces and Kerrigan battle throughout the pursuit. It is revealed that the Mobius Foundation is controlled by Valerian Mengsk, the son of Arcturus Mengsk, who opposes his father's methods of ruling of the Dominion. Valerian explains to Raynor that the Xel'naga artifacts, when pieced together, have the power to return Kerrigan to her human form. At one point, Zeratul suddenly appears on board Raynor's ship, allowing him to discover an ancient Xel'naga prophecy that Kerrigan must live as she will save the universe from a coming war against Protoss-Zerg hybrids. After learning this, Raynor mounts an invasion on Char in collaboration with Dominion forces under the control of Valerian, to eliminate the Zerg and rescue Kerrigan. The Xel'naga artifact releases an energy blast that kills the Zerg, and mostly returns Kerrigan to her human form. Raynor then carries the weakened Kerrigan over the ruined battlefield to safety.

=== In StarCraft II: Heart of the Swarm ===
Kerrigan is the main character in StarCraft II: Heart of the Swarm. After regaining her human form, Kerrigan is brought by Raynor to a secret research facility run by Valerian Mengsk to determine if she can still control the Zerg. However, the facility is attacked by Dominion forces and while Kerrigan and Valerian escape, Raynor is captured. Mengsk's publicly announces he has executed Raynor, and while planning to enact revenge against him, Kerrigan is approached by Zeratul, who tells her to travel to Zerus, the original homeworld of the Zerg. On Zerus, Kerrigan learns that a being called Amon stole a large portion of the Zerg from the planet and bound them to the Overmind, making them Amon's slaves as part of his plot to destroy both the Zerg and Protoss and remake life in his own image. Kerrigan learns that the Overmind created her as an attempt to free the Zerg from Amon's control. Kerrigan chooses to increase her power by entering a chrysalis, transforming again into a Zerg and Terran hybrid, though this time retaining her original personality. Mengsk contacts Kerrigan and reveals that Raynor was not killed, but is being held as a hostage. He threatens to kill Raynor if she goes to war against the Dominion. With help from Valerian and Raynor's forces, Kerrigan manages to rescue Raynor, but is rejected by him for choosing to return to her Zerg form. Now in full control of the Zerg, Kerrigan launches an attack on the Dominion's main world, Korhal, to defeat Mengsk. Valerian convinces her to permit civilian evacuation. As a result, Raynor and his raiders reinforce her assault on the imperial palace. Confronting Mengsk, Kerrigan is almost killed by the Xel'naga artifact before Raynor disables it. Kerrigan kills Mengsk, and leaves Raynor to prepare the swarm for the fight against Amon.

=== In StarCraft II: Legacy of the Void ===
During the events of Legacy of the Void, Kerrigan enters into an alliance with Artanis while investigating the Xel'Naga "homeworld" Ulnar, which the pair discover is in fact a colossal space station. Some time after Artanis's reclamation of the Protoss homeworld, Aiur, Kerrigan sends a psionic call to Raynor and Artanis: she proposes an alliance to permanently defeat Amon, since he will only arise again in a few thousand years if he is not dealt with. During the assault of the Void by the joint forces of the Terran Dominion, Zerg Swarm and Protoss, the full context of Zeratul's prophecy about Kerrigan is made clear; only a fellow Xel'Naga is capable of killing Amon, and Kerrigan is the only one who can ascend to that status. The allied forces are successful in defeating Amon. As Kerrigan is charging her power to finally kill Amon, she warns Jim to leave the area for his safety. The game's final cutscene is set two years later. Raynor is alone in a bar on the planet Mar Sara. Without further explanation, Kerrigan appears in the background, out of focus, in her human form and ghost armor. She asks Jim if he is ready to leave, and he gladly joins her; on screen text states they are never seen again.

=== In Heroes of the Storm ===
Kerrigan appears as a playable character in Blizzard's non-canon crossover video game Heroes of the Storm.

=== In novels ===
Kerrigan appears in several StarCraft novels that greatly expand her backstory before the first StarCraft game. The novel Uprising portrays Kerrigan's training as a Ghost assassin from an early age, where she is subjected to intense psychological abuse from her Confederate trainer, Lieutenant Rumm. When she was a young girl, an accident, most likely involving her powers, kills her mother and puts her father in a vegetative state. Consequently, Kerrigan is terrified to use her psionic abilities, and refuses Rumm's demands to show her power, even when he threatens to kill her father. Kerrigan is eventually subdued with mental implants and used as a top Confederate assassin until she is rescued by Arcturus Mengsk. The novels Liberty's Crusade and Queen of Blades provide novelisations for Kerrigan's actions in Episodes I and II of StarCraft respectively. Liberty's Crusade develops the implied relationship between Jim Raynor and Kerrigan, while Queen of Blades serves to demonstrate Kerrigan's complete transformation by the Zerg, her removal of her inhibitions and morality, and its effect on her former love, Raynor.

In addition, Kerrigan briefly appears in Gabriel Mesta's Shadow of the Xel'naga, set between StarCraft and Brood War, in which she attempts to secure a Xel'naga artifact on the independent colony world Bhekar Ro, but fails when it eradicates her forces. Kerrigan is also observed in Shadow Hunters, the second novel in The Dark Templar Saga, a trilogy that acts as a precursor to StarCraft II. After sensing a nexus of joined human minds caused by protagonist Jake Ramsey at the end of the first novel, Kerrigan sends Zerg forces to its location, infesting the half-dead body of a Dominion-funded black marketeer, Ethan Stewart. As the attack is the first Zerg activity for years, it inadvertently raises the suspicions of Arcturus Mengsk, who wonders what could have motivated it.

== Reception and legacy ==
Kerrigan has consistently received positive reviews from video-game journalists. GameSpot attributed the popularity of StarCraft to the reception of the game's characters, including Kerrigan. Her transition from Terran to Zerg was particularly praised, and they opined that the reason her face appeared on the box art for Brood War was due to how recognizable she had become. Following her appearance in Brood War, IGN commented favorably on the evolution of Kerrigan's character through StarCraft's storyline, and also described her as one of the most memorable villains in gaming. In 2007, Tom's Games opined she was one of the "most fascinatingly complex and memorable characters of all time". Following her appearance in StarCraft II and its expansions, numerous video-game journalists described Kerrigan among the best villains in gaming, with many commenting on the complexity of her character. Game Informer's Liz Lanier opined that Kerrigan was "as brutal as she is misunderstood." Rich Antoniello from Complex's described her life as a "tragic tale of nearly Shakespearean proportions", and Hanuman Welch considered her the most evil woman in video gaming. Kerrigan's voice acting has also received positive reception. Her portrayal in StarCraft by Glynnis Talken Campbell, was praised by GameSpot, while Tricia Helfer won "Best Performance by a Human Female" for her voicing of Kerrigan in StarCraft II: Wings of Liberty at the 2010 Spike Video Game Awards.

Kerrigan in her mostly human form in the arms of Jim Raynor. This scene from the epilogue cutscene of Wings of Liberty attracted criticism because Kerrigan was perceived as being reduced to a damsel in distress archetype.

Kerrigan's reception in relation to gender representation in video games, however, has been mixed. Writing in Nordlit and Games and Culture respectively, academics Sarah Stang and Gregory Blomquist cite Kerrigan as a rare example of a monstrous feminine character who is playable, empowered, and conventionally attractive, in contrast to feminine monsters such as The Mother in Dragon Age: Origins, who is a "physically grotesque" antagonist for the player to kill. Stang, however, considers Kerrigan's storyline to have patriarchal elements which undermine her empowerment; Kerrigan is infested against her will by the Overmind, who is voiced by male actors and who she refers to as her father, and Raynor's work to remove her infestation, also against her will, is said to turn her from being a femme fatale to a damsel in distress for him to protect. Stang concludes that while Kerrigan is more complex and designed less misogynistically than other monstrous women in gaming, she cannot be considered an example of positive female empowerment. Similarly, Blomquist comments that Kerrigan "teeter[s] on two binaries that both empower and disempower her". He criticized her over-sexualization, such as her exaggerated hip swing when walking and her feet resembling stiletto heels, which he argued is impractical for her frequent close combat fights and was only added to be visually appealing for male viewers. However, Blomquist also comments on Kerigan subverting hetero-normative gender roles, such as by penetrating Mengsk, the patriarchal Terran leader, with her skeletal wings before killing him, and also considers her sardonically referring to herself as "Queen Bitch of the Universe" as an empowering reclamation of the term 'bitch'. Reviewing Heart of the Swarm, video-game journalist Alec Meer from Rock Paper Shotgun said that "initially laudable attempts" to make Kerrigan a strong female were undermined by the game only using men to talk her out of making violent decisions. He was particularly critical of the sexualization of both her human and infested forms, calling her appearance a "disasterpiece of exploitation".

Kerrigan is featured in numerous StarCraft merchandise, including toys and miniature statues. Due to the complexity of Kerrigan's infested appearance, she is cited as a particularly difficult character for cosplaying, though attempts have been praised. Dwight Schrute dresses as Kerrigan's infested appearance for a Halloween party on a 2011 episode of The Office. The character is the subject of the song "Queen of Blades" by Swedish band Avatar on their 2009 album "Avatar". In 2012, Dutch musician Maduk and Canadian singer Veela released the song Ghost Assassin, a dedicated anthem for Kerrigan's arc throughout the StarCraft franchise.
