= Marc Butan =

American film producer

Mark Butan
- Citizenship: American
- Education: Ohio State University
- Occupations: Producer; Chief Executive Officer

Marc Butan is an American film producer and CEO of MadRiver Pictures, a Santa Monica, California-based motion picture production company.

== Early life and education ==
Butan is a native of Dayton, Ohio, and an alumnus of Ohio State University, where he became a member of Phi Kappa Tau.

== Career ==
During his career, he has served as co-president of Sierra/Affinity, president of Panorama Media, president of 2929 Productions, and executive vice president of production at Lionsgate, where he was responsible for overseeing film production at the studio. Butan previously worked as an investment banker at Kidder, Peabody & Co. and Prudential Financial.

In 2015, he founded MadRiver Pictures to produce star-driven commercial feature films. Since inception, the company has produced James Gray's The Lost City of Z starring Charlie Hunnam; Burr Steers' Pride and Prejudice and Zombies; Triple 9 starring Casey Affleck, Chiwetel Ejiofor, Kate Winslet, and Woody Harrelson; Mark Felt: The Man Who Brought Down the White House starring Liam Neeson; and James Gray's Ad Astra starring Brad Pitt.

In 2016, MadRiver Pictures and Vincent Maraval's Insiders joined forces to form an international film sales joint venture, IMR International. In 2021, IMR rebranded to The Veterans.

== Filmography ==
Year	Film	Credit
1998	Girl	Co-executive producer
1998	Desert Blue	Executive producer
1999	The Suburbans	Executive producer
1999	But I'm a Cheerleader	Executive producer
2001	Get Over It	Producer
2002	The Rules of Attraction	Executive producer
2003	Confidence	Producer
2003	Wonderland	Executive producer
2004	The Final Cut	Executive producer
2004	Godsend	Producer
2005	Good Night, and Good Luck	Executive producer
2006	Akeelah and the Bee	Executive producer
2006	Turistas	Producer
2006	The Ex	Executive producer
2006	Black Christmas	Executive producer
2007	We Own the Night	Producer
2007	The Life Before Her Eyes	Executive producer
2008	Two Lovers	Executive producer
2008	The Burning Plain	Executive producer
2009	The Road	Executive producer
2012	Killing Them Softly	Executive producer
2013	The Host	Executive producer
2016	Pride and Prejudice and Zombies	Producer
2016	Triple 9	Producer
2016	The Lost City of Z	Executive producer
2017	The Zookeeper's Wife	Executive producer
2017	Mark Felt: The Man Who Brought Down the White House	Producer
2019	Ad Astra	Executive producer
2020	Worth	Producer
2020	The Trial of the Chicago 7	Executive producer
2021	My Son	Producer
2022	Armageddon Time	Producer
2023	Plane	Producer
2026	Mutiny	Producer
TBA	Empire City	Producer
TBA	The Regional Office Is Under Attack	Producer
