= Resonance (Warehouse 13) =

- Warehouse 13 episode
- Episode no.: Season 1 Episode 3
- Directed by: Vincent Misiano
- Written by: David Simkins
- Original air date: July 14, 2009

Guest appearance
- Tricia Helfer as Bonnie Belski

Episode chronology
← Previous "Pilot"	Next → "Magnetism"

"Resonance" is the third episode of the first season of the Syfy television series Warehouse 13. It first aired July 14, 2009, and was written by David Simkins and directed by Vincent Misiano.

== Plot ==
Pete and Myka are sent to Chicago to investigate a series of odd bank robberies. During their investigation, they have a run-in with Bonnie Belski, a persistent FBI agent looking for a logical explanation for the happenings. It seems the bank robbers are using a device that creates a sound resonance so severe, it somewhat hypnotizes all who hear it and leaves them in a euphoric state for minutes after. It's up to Myka and Pete to figure out where the robbers will strike next and retrieve whatever bizarre object they are employing. Meanwhile, Artie examines a possible security breach back at the warehouse. Guest-starring Tricia Helfer.

== Artifacts ==
- Lewis Carroll's Mirror - Pete plays ping pong with himself using this mirror and half a ping pong table. Its exact nature is made clear in a later episode.
- Euphoria Record - a vinyl record, recorded by composer Eric Marsden. The tonality of the music, combined with the proper resonance, causes intense feelings of joy and euphoria in the listener, so extreme that they are briefly incapacitated. The effects can be blocked with headphones or earplugs.
- Steampunk Password Cracker - a brass cylinder with numeric dials, retrofitted with a USB cable. A frequently used part of Artie's travel bag, Artie uses this to bypass the security on Dickinson's computer.
- Still Camera - taking a picture of someone with this camera turns them into a cardboard cutout of themselves. Taking a second picture turns them back to normal.

== Production ==
Guest star Tricia Helfer made her appearance during a series of months that she also guest starred on Burn Notice, Chuck and Human Target as well as completing her run on the new version of Battlestar Galactica. In Chuck, Burn Notice, and Warehouse 13, her roles have all been as spies or secret agents. According to Helfer, compared to the agent she played in Chuck, Warehouse 13's Bonnie Belski is "by the book, but she's not as hard edged."

In an interview, McClintock describes the relationship between Pete and the character played by the "lovely and talented Tricia Helfer" thus: "I know Pete is fond of her, and I think she takes a shine to Pete as well." Helfer, in an interview, said that while she was on the set "very briefly," she enjoyed her scenes with McClintock and that "Eddie was great."

== Reception ==
"Resonance" received a 2.4 rating and was watched by 3.4 million viewers, including 1.6 million viewers between the ages of 25 and 54, and 1.2 million viewers between 18 and 49. According to SyFy, this made the episode "the #1 original cable drama in primetime Tuesday for the second week in a row among Adults 25-54".

IGN reviewer Ramsey Isler felt the series needed a solid second episode after the lackluster pilot to keep viewers coming back, but "Resonance" failed to do that, and was worse. Commenting on Helfer's guest appearance, Isler said she was "underutilized" and "nothing more than eye-candy and an excuse for Pete to flirt." According to the review, the best part of the episode was the subplot involving Artie.

On the other hand, Carlos Delgado of IfMagazine felt the episode was good enough to make him want to continue watching the show. He gave the episode a "B", singling out the episode's music as its high point, and its derivative nature as its low point, comparing it to The X-Files and Bones.

TV Squad reviewer Mike Moody enjoyed the episode's cast and "goofy old school tech" but not its "formulaic" plot, saying "the procedural elements of the story were pretty dull for a sci-fi show." His review praised Helfer's performance, while "expecting her role to be bigger or somewhat integral to the plot." Moody commented that the other major characters on the show were receiving back-stories while Pete was not. Still, McClintock's Pete, "somehow he still manages to be the most charming character of the bunch.

TV Verdict reviewer Stephen Lackey singled out the old looking gadgets as the episode's best parts and the procedural aspects as its worst. Lackey enjoyed the various subplots but felt Helfer was underutilized, with her character appearing mostly in the first half, saying, "she's just in the episode to look good and be flirted with by Pete." He ended his review by commenting that the "show can only ride on the charisma of the characters for so long."
