= Behind the Camera: The Unauthorized Story of Charlie's Angels =

- Based on: Charlie's Angels Casebook by Jack Condon & David Hofstede
- Screenplay by: Matt Doriff
- Directed by: Francine McDougall
- Starring: Christina Chambers; Tricia Helfer; Lauren Stamile
- Music by: Jeff Cardoni
- Country of origin: United States
- Original language: English

Production
- Producer: Ted Bauman
- Cinematography: Joel Ransom
- Editor: Paul Dixon
- Running time: 96 minutes

Original release
- Network: NBC
- Release: March 8, 2004

Behind the Camera: The Unauthorized Story of Charlie's Angels is a 2004 American made-for-television drama film documenting the success of the series Charlie's Angels, as well as the interpersonal conflicts that occurred among its staff and cast, based on the book Charlie's Angels Casebook. The film premiered on NBC on March 8, 2004.

== Cast ==
- Christina Chambers as Jaclyn Smith
- Tricia Helfer as Farrah Fawcett-Majors
- Lauren Stamile as Kate Jackson
- Bruce Altman as Leonard Goldberg
- Ben Browder as Lee Majors
- Dan Castellaneta as Aaron Spelling
- Dan Lauria as Fred Silverman
- Wallace Langham as Jay Bernstein
- Michael Tomlinson as Barney Rosenzweig
- Orson Bean as the voice of John Forsythe
- Geoff Callan as Steven Driscoll
