= Plane (film) =

2023 film by Jean-François Richet

- Theatrical release poster
- Directed by: Jean-François Richet
- Screenplay by: Charles Cumming; J. P. Davis
- Story by: Charles Cumming
- Produced by: Lorenzo di Bonaventura; Mark Vahradian; Marc Butan; Gerard Butler; Alan Siegel
- Starring: Gerard Butler; Mike Colter; Yoson An; Tony Goldwyn
- Cinematography: Brendan Galvin
- Edited by: David Rosenbloom
- Music by: Marco Beltrami; Marcus Trumpp
- Production companies: MadRiver Pictures; dB Pictures; G-BASE Film Production
- Distributed by: Lionsgate
- Release date: January 13, 2023
- Running time: 107 minutes
- Country: United States
- Language: English
- Budget: $25 million
- Box office: $74.5 million

Plane is a 2023 American action thriller film directed by Jean-François Richet from a screenplay by Charles Cumming and J. P. Davis. Starring Gerard Butler and Mike Colter, it follows a commercial pilot allying with a suspected murderer to save his passengers from a hostile territory after an emergency landing.

The film was announced in 2016, acquired by Lionsgate in 2019, sold to Solstice Studios in 2020, and re-acquired by Lionsgate in 2021. It was shot in Puerto Rico.

Plane was released in the United States on January 13, 2023 by Lionsgate. It received generally favorable reviews from critics and grossed $74.5 million worldwide on a $25 million budget.

== Plot ==
Commercial pilot Brodie Torrance, a former RAF pilot from Scotland, flies Trailblazer Airlines Flight 119 from Singapore to Honolulu via Tokyo using an DC-9 aircraft. Among the 14 passengers is fugitive homicide suspect Louis Gaspare, who is being extradited to Canada under custody of a Royal Canadian Mounted Police (RCMP) officer. Following a directive from one of his superiors, Brodie does not alter his route over the South China Sea despite severe weather, resulting in a lightning strike destroying the plane's avionics and killing a flight attendant and the RCMP officer during turbulence. Brodie and co-pilot Samuel Dele manage an emergency landing on a remote airstrip on Jolo island in the southern Philippines.

In New York, Trailblazer Airlines activates its crisis response team led by David Scarsdale. With local authorities requiring 24 hours to mount a response, Scarsdale dispatches a private mercenary team to enter the rebel-controlled island. Meanwhile, Brodie ventures into the jungle with Louis, a former French Foreign Legionnaire, in search of help. At an abandoned warehouse, Brodie manages to contact the airline and his daughter to reveal their location before being attacked by a rebel, whom he kills. Louis kills other rebels in the building, and the two discover that the rebels take foreigners hostage for ransom. They rush back to the plane, but rebel leader Datu Junmar and his forces arrive first and capture the remaining passengers and crew, killing a couple who attempt to escape.

After the rebels leave, Brodie and Louis ambush two rebels looting the plane's luggage, forcing them to reveal the location of their base before killing them. Brodie leaves a note behind to inform potential rescue teams of the situation. Infiltrating the rebel base, Brodie and Louis kill several guards and successfully escort the passengers and crew onto a bus. However, trapped by more rebels, Brodie decides to stay behind to create a diversion. As he is about to be executed, the hired mercenaries arrive and inflict heavy casualties on Junmar's forces. The passengers, crew, and mercenaries retreat to the plane while the remaining rebels continue their attack.

Brodie and Dele work to restart the aircraft while the mercenaries and Louis fight off the advancing rebels. Louis chooses to stay behind, killing a rebel attempting to fire a rocket-propelled grenade at the plane, before fleeing into the jungle with a bag containing contingency ransom money. Junmar attempts to fire again but is killed by the aircraft’s landing gear during takeoff.

The airline locates a functional runway on the nearby island of Siasi, where Brodie manages to land the damaged aircraft. As emergency personnel tend to the passengers and crew, Brodie calls his daughter, telling her he is coming home.

== Cast ==
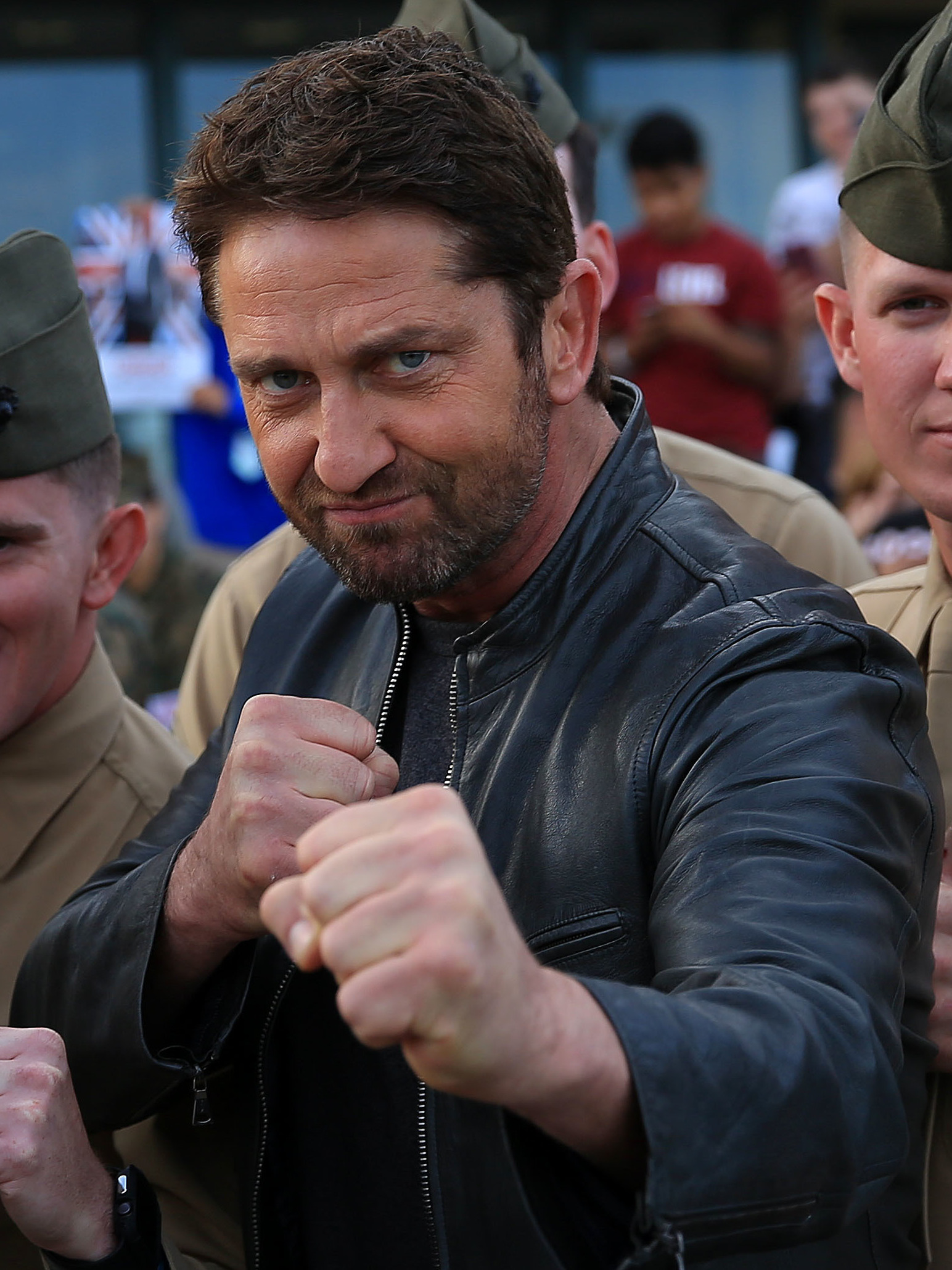
Lead actor and producer Gerard Butler

- Gerard Butler as Brodie Torrance, a commercial pilot and former RAF officer
- Mike Colter as Louis Gaspare, a former GCP French Foreign Legioner being extradited to Toronto on charges of homicide
- Tony Goldwyn as David Scarsdale, the airline crisis manager who organizes the rescue effort
- Yoson An as Samuel Dele, Brodie's co-pilot
- Evan Dane Taylor as Datu Junmar, a local warlord and terrorist leader on Jolo
- Paul Ben-Victor as Terry Hampton, the owner of the airline
- Daniella Pineda as Bonnie Lane, the flight purser
- Lilly Krug as Brie Taylor, an American passenger and Katie's friend
- Kelly Gale as Katie Dhar, a Swedish passenger and Brie's friend
- Joey Slotnick as Matt Sinclair, an American businessman and one of the passengers
- Remi Adeleke as John Shellback, the leader of the private military team
- Claro de los Reyes as Hajan, Junmar's second-in-command

Also appearing as passengers are Otis Winston as the RCMP officer, Angel Fabian Rivera as Karim Rahim, Fernando Chang as Chan Yuen, Modesto Lacen as Antonio Ortega, Rose Eshay as Ana Fernandez, Ricky Robles Cruz as Javier Molina Jo, Jessica Nam as Rosalie Jeong, Quinn McPherson as Riley Donahue, Oliver Trevena as Maxwell Carver, and John J. Shim as Joshua Jeong, while Michelle Lee and Amber Rivera portray flight attendants Isabella Yu and Maria, respectively. Appearing as members of the private military team are Matt Cook as Moses, Pete Scobell as Jim Lake, and James Sang Lee as Willis. Heather Seiffert plays Brodie's sister Carrie and Haleigh Hekking plays his daughter Daniela.

== Production ==
On July 13, 2016, MadRiver Pictures acquired The Plane, an original pitch from novelist Charles Cumming, with Marc Butan and Di Bonaventura Pictures' Lorenzo di Bonaventura and Mark Vahradian announced as producers. In October 2019, it was reported that Gerard Butler had joined the cast and would also produce alongside Alan Siegel.

In November 2019, Lionsgate Films acquired distribution rights to the film, but in November 2020, it abandoned the project after failing to obtain production insurance that would cover a COVID-19 outbreak, as the studio did not want to risk the film's original $50 million budget, and Solstice Studios acquired the rights to the film. However, in May 2021, Lionsgate re-acquired the rights to The Plane, in what Andreas Wiseman from Deadline Hollywood described as a "case of high-profile Hollywood volleyball."

In August 2021, Kelly Gale, Mike Colter, Daniella Pineda, Yoson An, Remi Adeleke, Haleigh Hekking, Lilly Krug, Joey Slotnick, and Oliver Trevena joined the cast. Production began that same month in Puerto Rico. Michael Cho, Tim Lee, Gary Raskin, Alastair Burlingame, and Vicki Dee Rock were attached to the film as Executive Producers. On a podcast, Colter said the film was going to focus more on characterization than action sequences. On October 11, 2021, it was reported that filming was close to finishing and that Tony Goldwyn and Paul Ben-Victor would also star.

== Release ==
The film was released in theaters in the United States on January 13, 2023, by Lionsgate. It was previously set for release on January 27, 2023.

The film was released to VOD on February 3, 2023. It was later released on Blu-ray, DVD and 4K UHD on March 28, 2023.

== Reception ==
=== Box office ===
Plane grossed $32.1 million in the United States and Canada, and $42.4 million in other territories, for a worldwide total of $74.5 million. Deadline Hollywood calculated the net profit of the film to be $35 million, when factoring together all expenses and revenues.

In the United States and Canada, Plane was released alongside House Party and the wide expansion of A Man Called Otto, and was projected to gross $7–10 million from 3,023 theaters in its opening weekend. The film made $3 million on its first day, including $435,000 from Thursday night previews. It went on to debut to $10.2 million ($11.8 million over the four-day MLK weekend), finishing in fifth. The film made $5.3 million and $3.8 million in its second and third weekends, respectively.

=== Critical response ===
On the review aggregator website Rotten Tomatoes, 78% of 170 critics' reviews are positive, with an average rating of 6/10. The website's consensus reads: "Plane charts a standard action-adventure course with its cruising altitude just a few miles above Direct-to-Video – but with Gerard Butler in the cockpit, thriller enthusiasts may still find this a fairly fun flight." Metacritic, which uses a weighted average, assigned the film a score of 62 out of 100, based on 43 critics, indicating "generally favorable" reviews. Audiences polled by CinemaScore gave the film an average grade of "B+" on an A+ to F scale, while those polled by PostTrak gave it an 83% positive score, with 63% saying they would definitely recommend it.

=== Reaction in the Philippines ===
Filipino actor and senator Robin Padilla condemned the film's portrayal of the Philippines, pointing out how the film depicted Jolo as being run by separatists and militia, and the Philippine Army as "cowards". In real life, the Jihadist group Abu Sayyaf established their base of operations in Jolo but were not able to push out the Philippine Government's authority in the island. Their presence has also declined significantly since their peak in the 2000s. Padilla's criticism was supported by fellow senator Ronald dela Rosa and Senate President Migz Zubiri, who argued the film could damage the country's tourism. Meanwhile, the Directors' Guild of the Philippines opposed the proposed ban, saying that it constituted censorship, and argued that the ban could set a precedent on the freedom of artistic expression of any depiction of the country. They also argued that the film was not a reliable commentary on the country's affairs, stating that Plane was just "mindless B-movie entertainment".

In response, the Movie and Television Review and Classification Board (MTRCB) of the Philippines stated that it would re-evaluate the film and launch talks with the film's producers and local distributors. On February 23 Pioneer Films, the distributor of the film, voluntarily pulled out the film from "public exhibition" in a letter to the MTRCB, saying that they intend to submit a "new version of the film for appropriate review and classification."

== Cancelled sequel ==
In February 2023, it was announced Colter would reprise his role as Louis Gaspare for a sequel titled Ship, with Richet returning as an executive producer. Production companies MadRiver Pictures, Di Bonaventura Pictures and G-BASE Productions were also signed on to the project. While Butler was not attached to star, a cameo appearance was possible.

In February 2026, Colter stated that Butler had exited the film two weeks before filming was expected to begin, effectively causing its cancellation.
