= Remi Adeleke =

American writer and actor

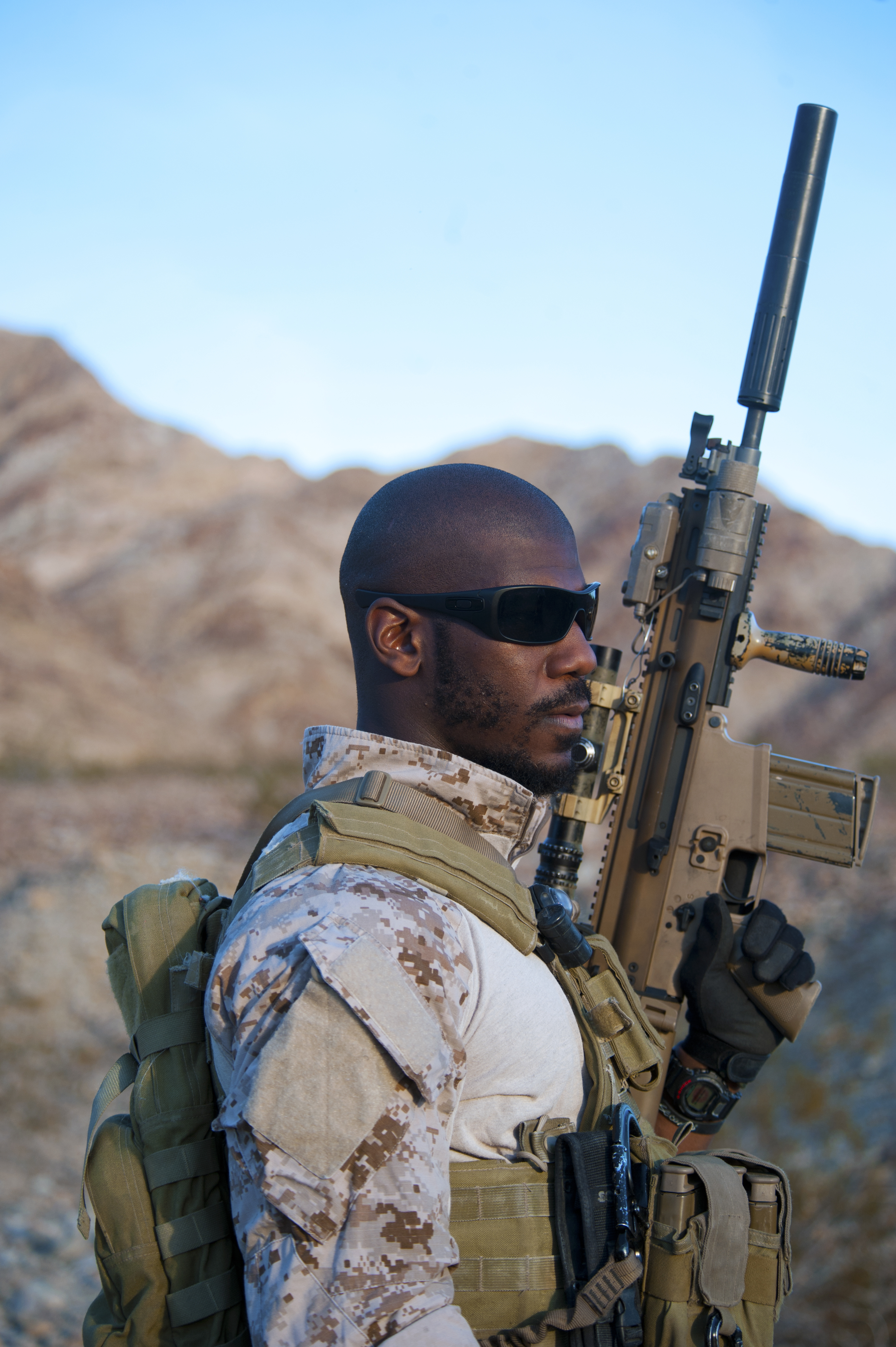
- Adeleke in 2012
- Occupations: Writer; actor; former Navy SEAL
- Known for: 6 Underground; Ambulance; Plane; The Unexpected

Remi Adeleke is an American writer, actor, and former Navy SEAL. He is known for his roles in films such as 6 Underground, Ambulance, and Plane.

== Early life ==
Remi Adeleke was born to a wealthy family in Nigeria. The family lost all their money when his father died and Adeleke moved to the Bronx, New York with his mother. He got in trouble as a youth for stealing and began selling drugs.

== Career ==
Adeleke joined the U.S. Navy when he was 19. When he initially signed up, he was told he had two arrest warrants, both of which were expunged in order for him to join. He joined the United States Navy and was accepted into the Navy SEAL program after a year of training. He graduated in 2008 and was a SEAL until he left the military in 2016.

After the military, Adeleke began acting, with his first role as an extra in the television series The Last Ship. He was then cast for a one-day role in a Michael Bay film which led to a role in Transformers: The Last Knight, portraying a TRF Lieutenant under the command of Santos. He continued working with Bay, acting in the 2019 film 6 Underground and 2022 film Ambulance.

In 2022, Adeleke directed the short film The Unexpected, which was filmed in Kansas City and released on YouTube. In 2023, he released Chameleon, a fictional book based loosely on his own life. He also played a mercenary in the 2023 film Plane. Adeleke is also a filmmaker, having directed the film Unexpected Redemption.

== Books ==
- Adeleke, Remi (18 May 2021). Transformed: A Navy Seal's Unlikely Journey from the Throne of Africa, to the Streets of the Bronx, to Defying All Odds. Thomas Nelson Incorporated. ISBN 978-0-7852-4166-9.

=== Fiction ===
- Adeleke, Remi (25 July 2023). Chameleon: A Black Box Thriller. HarperCollins. ISBN 978-0-06-323887-9.
