= The Unexpected (film) =

2022 film by Remi Adeleke

- Directed by: Remi Adeleke
- Written by: Remi Adeleke
- Produced by: Khalid Abdulqaadir; Bradley Boyce; Corey McCartney
- Starring: Kerry Lynne McHugh; Justin Garza; John Wilcox; Raelin Searcy; Jorge M. Roman; Santiago Vasquez; Charisse Taylor
- Cinematography: Lucas Falco Cohen
- Edited by: Caleb Vetter
- Music by: Jesse Hartov; Etienne Monsaingeon
- Production companies: 8th Wonder Ent; AGA Productions
- Release date: September 30, 2022 (YouTube)
- Running time: 32 minutes
- Country: United States
- Language: English

The Unexpected is a 2022 American drama short film written and directed by Remi Adeleke. The film stars Kerry Lynne McHugh, Justin Garza, John Wilcox, Raelin Searcy, and Jorge M. Roman.

== Premise ==
Based on true events, two victims tell a story about terrorism's link to human trafficking and organ harvesting.

== Cast ==
- Kerry Lynne McHugh as Olivia Leblanc
- Justin Garza as Diego Rivera
- John Wilcox as Harvey Leblanc
- Raelin Searcy as Zara Khalif
- Jorge M. Roman as Dr. Lugo
- Santiago Vasquez as Police Chief Armas
- Charisse Taylor as Wife

== Production ==
The film was shot in August 2021 in Kansas City, Missouri, including Kansas City International Airport, which doubled for an airport in Venezuela, and a farm in Louisburg that was made to look like Peru. It was Adeleke's directorial debut.

== Release ==
The film was presented at the Cannes Market by Lon Haber & Co. and released on YouTube by Adeleke on September 30, 2022.

== Sequel ==
Set five years later, Adeleke wrote a feature length script that was in development as an action thriller film. It premiered in 2022 at the Toronto International Film Festival.
