= Fighting Tommy Riley =

- Theatrical release poster
- Directed by: Eddie O'Flaherty
- Written by: J. P. Davis
- Produced by: Eddie O'Flaherty; Bettina Tendler O'Mara
- Starring: J. P. Davis; Eddie Jones; Christina Chambers; Diane Tayler; Paul Raci
- Cinematography: Michael Fimognari
- Edited by: Aram Nigoghossian
- Music by: Tim Simonec
- Production companies: Visualeyes Productions; 1st Chance Productions
- Distributed by: Freestyle Releasing
- Release dates: June 18, 2004 (Los Angeles Film Festival); May 6, 2005 (United States)
- Running time: 109 minutes
- Country: United States
- Language: English
- Budget: $300,000
- Box office: $10,514

Fighting Tommy Riley is a 2004 independent American sports drama film. It tells the story of Tommy Riley and Marty Goldberg, a boxer and his trainer, as they work to secure a title shot for Tommy. Their plans are complicated by the unrequited feelings Marty develops for Tommy. When a big-time promoter seeks to acquire Tommy's contract, Tommy endangers his future career because of his loyalty to Marty. Marty, seeing only one way to free Tommy to take his shot, takes his own life.

Directed by Eddie O'Flaherty, the film was written by J. P. Davis, who sold the script only on the condition that he himself would play Tommy. It also stars Eddie Jones as Marty, Christina Chambers as Stephanie, Diane Tayler as Diane Stone, and Paul Raci as Bob Silver.

Fighting Tommy Riley opened in limited release on May 6, 2005, to generally positive reviews, with Jones's performance as Marty frequently singled out for praise.

== Plot ==
Tommy Riley (J. P. Davis) stands in boxing gear in a dingy dressing room. There is a knock at the door and a voice calls out, "Are you ready?"

The film flashes back seven months. Tommy is a former boxer who almost made the 2000 U.S. Olympic boxing team as a middleweight. He works laying computer cable and earns money on the side as a sparring partner in a local gym. His lack of motivation has led his girlfriend Stephanie (Christina Chambers) to move out.

Marty (Eddie Jones) is a former boxer, now a high school teacher and boxing trainer/manager who had previously coached a fighter to a title shot, only to have the fighter leave him just before the fight. Marty and his business partner Diane (Diane Tayler) arrive at the gym where Tommy spars to scout his sparring partner. The fighter's manager instructs Tommy to make his fighter look good, but after he suffers a low blow, Tommy knocks the fighter out with one punch. The manager and the gym's owner angrily order Tommy from the gym but Marty and Diane chase after him, inviting him to train with Marty.

Tommy's reputation and news of his return to the ring spark interest from promoters. After training some time, Marty and Diane set up a fight so that promoters can see him in action. He wins the fight but the promoter at ringside shows no enthusiasm.

Diane gives Marty a tape of Tommy's 1999 Olympic trial fight. Tommy was ahead after two rounds but quit before round three because of a hand injury. Marty realizes that Tommy faked his injury because of the poor coaching and abuse coming from his stepfather, who was serving as his cornerman. Marty and Tommy talk about Tommy's stepfather and Marty's former fighter. Marty tells Tommy that boxing is a team sport and that Tommy will never be alone in the ring. Tommy's renewed motivation as a fighter leads to a reconciliation with Stephanie.

Leroy Kane (Don Wallace), the fighter who went to the Olympics instead of Tommy, wants a "tune-up" fight before his fight for the middleweight title. His scheduled opponent is injured and Diane sets Tommy up for the bout instead. The fight is in four weeks, so Tommy and Marty go to Marty's cabin in the woods to train without distractions. After several days, during a rubdown following a workout, Marty touches Tommy inappropriately. Tommy reacts strongly negatively and Marty apologizes. They agree to ignore the incident but return to the city ahead of schedule.

On the night of Tommy's fight with Kane, Tommy and Marty plan to force Kane to exhaust himself pursuing Tommy until the seventh round and then put him away. The plan works and Tommy knocks out Kane in round seven. After the fight Marty plans to take everyone out for a celebratory dinner but Bob Silver (Paul Raci), a big-time promoter, has watched the fight and, impressed, invites them all out. Marty declines and goes home, but later that night is taken to the hospital. Tommy rushes to the hospital and finds Diane there. He asks if Marty is in the hospital because of what happened at the cabin. Diane tells him that when Marty was a fighter, people threatened to expose Marty's homosexuality, so he ended his career by putting his hand through a window and damaging it. He became a teacher and his influence led Diane to make herself a success. When Marty is released, Tommy moves in with him temporarily to help him recuperate.

Bob summons Tommy, alone, for a meeting. Bob offers him a million dollar three-fight contract on the condition that he leave Marty. Marty, Bob says, has a "tainted rep" in the fight game and represents an "element" that boxing will never be ready for. Tommy refuses the deal if it means leaving Marty. Diane and Marty both advise Tommy to take the offer but he still refuses. Stephanie and Tommy argue about the offer and Tommy drives Stephanie away.

Marty tries to alienate Tommy by ignoring him during training and becoming verbally abusive. After Marty slaps Tommy several times during a training session, Tommy attacks him, yelling that if Marty ever puts his "faggot-ass hands" on him again, he will kill him. Later that night Tommy goes to Marty's place to apologize and to tell him that Marty can't make him go away. Marty refuses to take him back. Tommy reduces himself to offering himself to Marty sexually. Marty explodes at him, furious that Tommy would think that of him after all they'd been through.

The next morning, Tommy rushes back to Marty's house where he and a distraught Diane find Marty's body. He has committed suicide by taking an overdose of sleeping pills. Tommy calls Stephanie to apologize and to tell her of Marty's death.

The film returns to the opening scene. Tommy breaks down in tears but stops crying when, upon catching sight of a mirror, he sees the image of Marty standing behind him. He finishes dressing for the fight and, as he walks to the ring, hears Stephanie calling to him. He turns to her; they smile. He resumes his walk to the ring and the camera pulls back to reveal that he is dressed in Marty's old ring robe in tribute.

== Cast ==
- J. P. Davis as Tommy Riley
- Eddie Jones as Marty Goldberg
- Christina Chambers as Stephanie
- Diane Tayler as Diane Stone
- Paul Raci as Bob Silver
- Don Wallace as Lenny Kane
- Scot Belsky as Freddie Holt
- Michael Bent as Mosley

== Production ==
J. P. Davis was inspired to write the script after observing an older trainer working with a young boxer in a Brooklyn gym: "I watched the guy spar. You could tell he wasn't going anywhere, but you could never convince the trainer. He's almost a caretaker. He's watching out for you completely. You could see the devotion involved." Drawing upon material originally created for his critically acclaimed one-man off-Broadway show "Dreamer Awakens," Davis completed the script in 1999 and moved to Los Angeles.

Unrepresented by management, Davis sent his script out unsolicited to agents and studios over the course of the next three years. Davis secured representation through his efforts and received a number of studio offers, but, in a story reminiscent of Sylvester Stallone's experience with Rocky, he refused to sell the script unless he was signed to play the title role. He also resisted demands that Marty be made heterosexual. While Davis and director O'Flaherty honed the script, Davis trained as a boxer to add to the film's authenticity. The film was shot in Los Angeles on high-definition digital video on a budget of $200,000 and was O'Flaherty's feature debut.

The part of Marty was originally to be played by Rod Steiger, but Steiger died in 2002, before filming could begin.

== Critical response ==
Fighting Tommy Riley received generally positive reviews, with Eddie Jones frequently singled out for his performance. Variety gave the film an overall favorable review, citing Jones in particular for "personally push[ing] the movie to a higher emotional plane." Davis and Tayler are also praised, the former for "grow[ing] into [the] role" and the latter for her "pro job at playing counterpoint" to Jones. Collectively the cast, but especially Jones, is said to elevate the picture above being a "standard drama on the sweet science with the usual tropes."

The San Francisco Chronicle largely agreed, calling Davis "a Van Damme who can act" and Jones "never less than convincing" as well as praising director O'Flaherty for "coach[ing] solid performances from his small cast and mak[ing] the most of the handful of up-close, well-choreographed fight montages." The Los Angeles Times was even more effusive, citing Jones as "unforgettable" and "in such command of his acting skills that Marty's every gesture, look and movement is expressive and revealing," Davis' script as "exceptional" and his performance "no less fully realized" and O'Flaherty's direction as "subtle...intense and convincing." Tayler and Chambers are also lauded, Tayler for creating a "well drawn" character and Chambers for delivering an "effective" performance. Sports Illustrated called the film "stylish and well-paced" despite its limited budget and echoes others' praise for Jones's "nuanced, intense performance," but (without mentioning the plot point of Marty's sexual advance) pinpoints the retreat to Marty's cabin as when the script "starts to look and sound like beginners' work."

When asked to name that year's notable indie films and directors, famed film critic Roger Ebert stated "First-time director Eddie O’Flaherty was able to work outside the system to make Fighting Tommy Riley, a film that I think can play in any theater or any multiplex. And yet it’s a boxing picture that is quite different from any formula boxing picture you’ve ever seen. In the final analysis, it’s not even really about boxing."

Strongly dissenting was the Village Voice, calling the film "[o]utrageously sentimental and retrograde" and in need of "serious vetting by [LGBT media watchdog organization] GLAAD." The Voice compared Marty's fate to that of other cinematic "self-loathing homosexuals" like Martha Dobie of The Children's Hour. However, writing for the LGBT-interest Advocate magazine, gay film researcher David Ehrenstein praised the film for "speak[ing] volumes about those whom the gay rights revolution never touched and about the lives of older gays and lesbians in general."

Cinematographer Michael Fimognari won the Kodak Award for Cinematography at the 14th Annual Hamptons International Film Festival. Fighting Tommy Riley was an official selection of the 7th Annual San Francisco Independent Film Festival and of the 2004 Los Angeles Film Festival.

== See also ==
- List of boxing films
