= J. P. Davis =

American actor

J.P. Davis is an American screenwriter and actor who appeared in several movies and TV shows.

== Biography ==
Raised on the Upper West Side of Manhattan, Davis attended the Berkshire School before graduating from Georgetown University's School of Foreign Service. He played varsity lacrosse at both Berkshire and Georgetown.

Davis' first screenplay was Fighting Tommy Riley, which he wrote with the intention of playing the title role. Oscar winner William Goldman was one of the first people to read the script; he mentored and encouraged Davis to move to Los Angeles. Davis procured a micro-budget of $130,000 to shoot Fighting Tommy Riley. Fighting Tommy Riley premiered at the Los Angeles Film Festival and then went on to play at the Hamptons Film Festival (where it won the Kodak Award) and at the San Francisco Film Festival. The film was well received and opened theatrically in Los Angeles, New York City and San Francisco. It is currently available on Netflix.

His other writing credits include The Contractor (2022), Plane (2023) and Mutiny (2026).
