= Tricia Helfer =

Canadian and American actress and former model (born 1974)

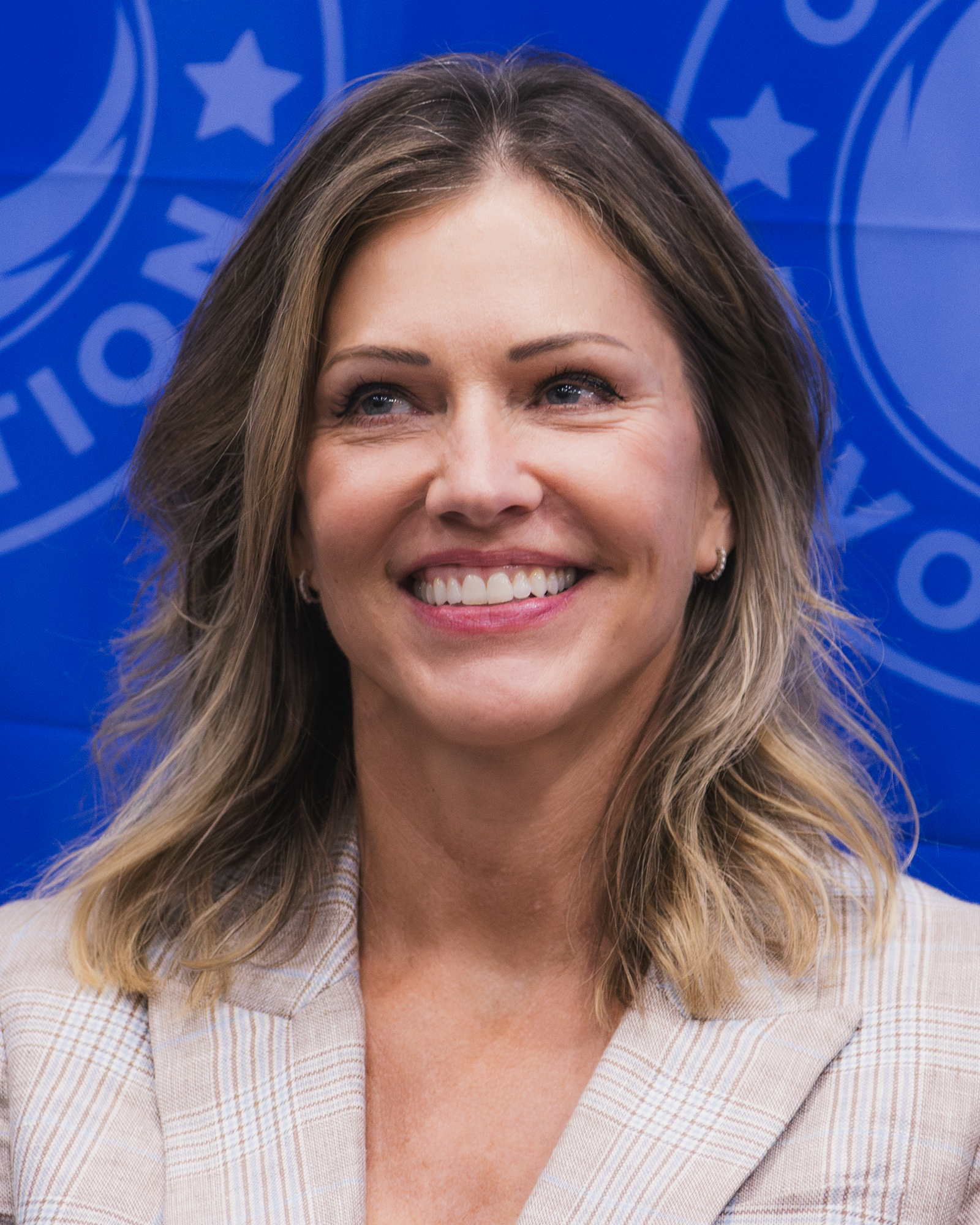
- Helfer in 2026
- Born: Tricia Janine Helfer; April 11, 1974 (age 52); Donalda, Alberta, Canada
- Citizenship: Canada; United States
- Occupations: Actress; model
- Years active: 1992–present
- Height: 5 ft 10 in (178 cm)
- Spouse: Jonathan Marshall (m. 2003; div. 2019)

Tricia Janine Helfer (born April 11, 1974) is a Canadian and American actress and former model.

Helfer worked as a fashion model from 1992 to 2002 appearing in ad campaigns for Ralph Lauren, Versace, Chanel, and Giorgio Armani, and appearing in shows for Carolina Herrera, Christian Dior, Givenchy, and Dolce & Gabbana and others. She appeared on the cover ELLE, Cosmopolitan, Marie Claire, and Vogue, regularly in Maxim magazine and on the February 2007 cover of Playboy. In 2002, Helfer relocated to Los Angeles to pursue an acting career. She is best known for her role as Number Six in the science fiction series Battlestar Galactica (2003–2009). She also portrayed the wife of God in the series Lucifer (2016–2021) and had a recurring role on the CBS sitcom Two and a Half Men.

== Early life ==
Helfer was born in rural Donalda, Alberta, Canada, to Dennis and Elaine Helfer. She studied at William E. Hay Composite High School in Stettler, Alberta. She lived and worked on the family's grain farm with her three sisters, Trena, Tammy and Tara. Helfer was discovered at age 17 by a modeling agency scout while standing in line at a movie theatre.

== Career ==
=== Modeling ===
In 1992, she won Ford Models' Supermodel of the World contest. Helfer retired from fashion modelling in 2002 and said all her shoots since then are related to projects or product endorsements. She has appeared in ad campaigns for Ralph Lauren, Versace, Chanel, and Giorgio Armani.

Helfer has walked for top fashion shows, such as Carolina Herrera, Christian Dior, Claude Montana, Givenchy, John Galliano, and Dolce & Gabbana. Helfer has appeared on the covers of Flare, Amica, ELLE, Cosmopolitan, Marie Claire, and Vogue, among others. She also regularly appeared in photo shoots by Maxim magazine, was the magazine's wall calendar girl for 2005, and was ranked #57 on the Maxim's Hot 100 Women of 2007. Helfer was also featured as the cover model for the February 2007 issue of Playboy.

In 2026, Helfer launched an OnlyFans account.

=== Acting ===
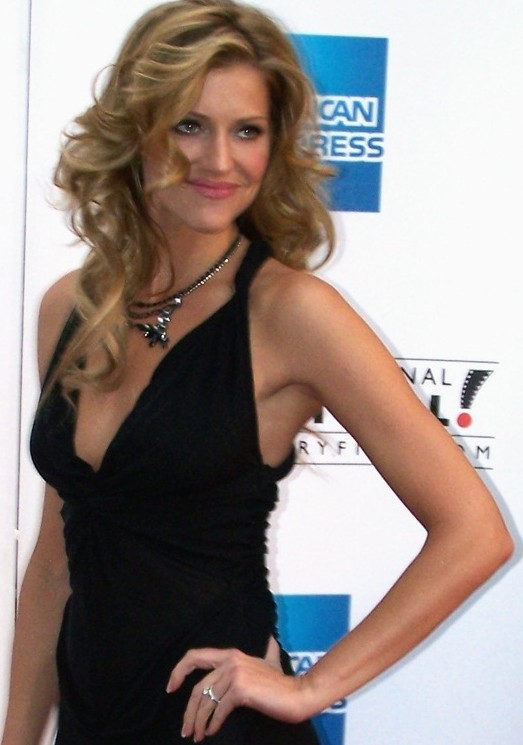
Helfer at the 2007 Calgary International Film Festival

Helfer relocated to Los Angeles in 2002 to pursue an acting career. Her first acting assignment was a co-starring role as Sarah on the television series Jeremiah. She later played a model named Ashleigh James on the May 16, 2002 episode of CSI: Crime Scene Investigation ("The Hunger Artist"). In 2002, she played Eva in the independent film White Rush.

In 2003, she played Number Six on Battlestar Galactica. In 2004, she portrayed Farrah Fawcett in the telefilm Behind the Camera: The Unauthorized Story of Charlie's Angels. Concurrent with her role in Battlestar Galactica, Helfer began producing and hosting Canada's Next Top Model on May 31, 2006. She appeared in Spiral and The Green Chain later the same year.

In October 2006, it was announced that Helfer would not return to host the second season of Canada's Next Top Model so she could concentrate on Battlestar Galactica. Helfer also played a major role in Electronic Arts' video game Command & Conquer 3: Tiberium Wars, as the high-level Nod general Kilian Qatar, along with her Battlestar Galactica co-star, actress Grace Park. She also starred in the episode "Roadkill" on the second season of Supernatural.

Helfer had a recurring role on the CBS sitcom Two and a Half Men. She played Gail, best friend of Charlie's (Charlie Sheen) fiancée Chelsea (Jennifer Taylor). When Chelsea finds out that her friend is recovering from a breakup, she says she should do so at Charlie's house. Shortly after Chelsea and Charlie begin a trial separation, Gail begins a sexual relationship with Charlie.

==== Battlestar Galactica ====
In 2003, the television series Battlestar Galactica was used as the basis for a three-hour miniseries on the Sci Fi channel. The project was written and produced by Ronald D. Moore and directed by Michael Rymer. Helfer played the role of Number Six, a humanoid Cylon operative. She continued that role as a regular cast member in the TV series, which completed its fourth and final season on March 20, 2009. Due to the special nature of the Number Six character – there are many "copies" of Number Six with distinct personalities – Helfer has, in effect, played numerous roles on the series. In 2009, she reprised her role as Number Six in Battlestar Galactica: The Plan – a television movie that tells the story of the series from the Cylons' point of view. In 2012, she voiced a prototype Cylon in the prequel Battlestar Galactica: Blood & Chrome.

Awards:

- Leo Awards, Best Lead Performance By A Female in a Dramatic Series, Tricia Helfer ("Pegasus")

Nominations:

- Scream Awards, Breakout Performance, Tricia Helfer as Number Six
- Scream Awards, Best Television Actress, Tricia Helfer

==== 2008–2015 ====
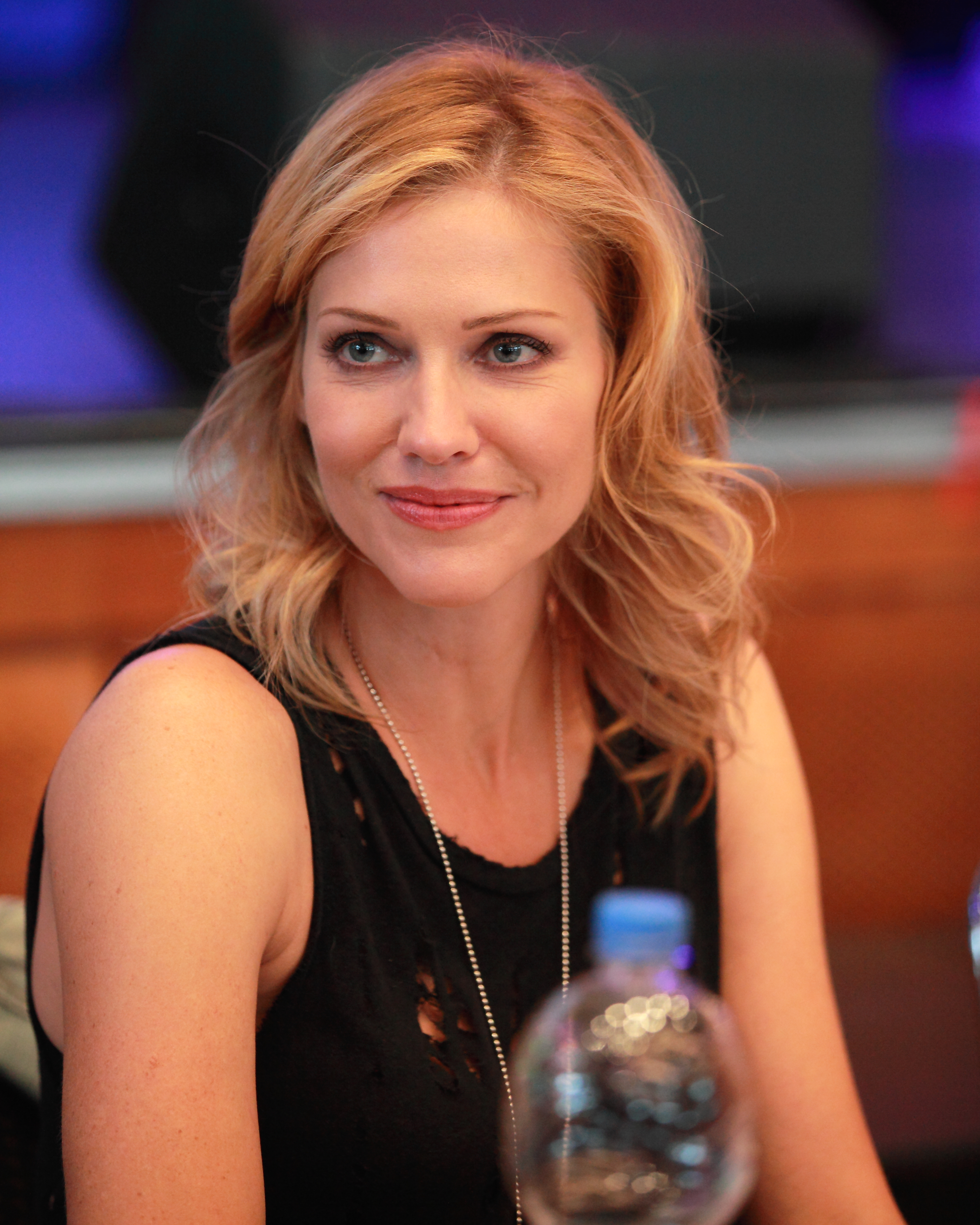
Helfer in 2015

In August 2008, Helfer appeared on the stage of NVISION 08, an event sponsored by NVIDIA, where she discussed her role in Battlestar Galactica as well as the use of computer graphics on the show. Helfer appeared in an episode of the NBC series Chuck, and as Michael Westen's nemesis in the USA Network series Burn Notice as "Carla Baxter". She appears as herself in Old 97's music video for their song, "Dance with Me".

She guest starred in "Resonance", the second episode of Warehouse 13 as FBI Agent Bonnie Belski on Syfy. She made a guest appearance in the pilot episode of Fox's 2009 mid-season series Human Target. She has played several prominent video game roles in recent years; including Kilian Quatar in Command & Conquer 3: Tiberium Wars, Veronica Dare in Halo 3: ODST and EDI, the artificial intelligence aboard the Normandy SR-2 in Mass Effect 2 and Mass Effect 3. She voices Sarah Kerrigan in StarCraft II: Wings of Liberty and the expansion sets Heart of the Swarm and Legacy of the Void. Helfer voices Black Cat in The Spectacular Spider-Man and reprised her role in Spider-Man: Web of Shadows.

Helfer joined the cast of Jerry Bruckheimer's TNT drama, Dark Blue, as FBI Special Agent Alex Rice. The show was cancelled in November 2010 because of low ratings. In October 2010, she made a guest appearance on Lie to Me.

In 2011, she starred in The Black Keys' music video for "Howlin' for You". She made guest appearances in No Ordinary Family (2011), and Franklin & Bash (2011). In 2011, Helfer starred as Morgana, a necromancer, in the TV series pilot 17th Precinct from Ron Moore with Galactica's co-stars James Callis and Jamie Bamber. In October 2011, she got the lead role in the TV pilot Scent of the Missing as Susannah, a K-9 Search and Rescue Volunteer. In November 2011, she appeared in the Hallmark TV movie Mistletoe Over Manhattan. For 2012, she signed for the recurring role of Alex Clark in the new NBC TV Series The Firm. On May 16 and 23 of 2012, she appeared in the two-part season 7 finale of the CBS series Criminal Minds, in which she led a team of bank-robbing serial killers. She guest starred in the second season of the Jane Espenson web series, Husbands.

In 2014, she played Molly Parker on ABC's Killer Women, a remake of the Argentinian drama Mujeres Asesinas, with producer Sofia Vergara. Also in 2014, she played Viondra Denniger, the steward and captain's wife of the titular starship in the miniseries Ascension on its long journey carrying people to populate a new world. Helfer voiced Sonya Blade in the fighting game, Mortal Kombat X, which was released in April 2015.

In 2015, she appeared in the series finale of Falling Skies as the Espheni Queen, the leader of the alien race that had invaded Earth and devastated humanity. She also played Louise, a woman attending a doll convention, in the web series Con Man.

==== 2016–present ====
In 2016, Helfer was added to the main cast for the second season of the Fox series Lucifer, playing the vessel of the titular character's real mother and "Goddess of all creation". She served as the primary antagonist of Season 2, and a minor character in Season 3.

In 2015–16, she played a recurring role as Evan Smith, a corporate attorney in the USA network series Suits.

In 2019, she was added to the main cast for the fourth season of the SyFy series Van Helsing, playing Dracula, the Dark One, who is the ruler of the vampire species.

== Personal life ==
In 2003, Helfer married Jonathan Marshall, a lawyer whom she met at a mutual friend's birthday party. They separated in May 2017 and Helfer filed for divorce in January 2018, citing irreconcilable differences. The divorce was settled in 2019.

In 2011, Helfer became an American citizen.

She has four artificial discs in her back: two in her neck, resulting from an incident in which a piece of luggage was dropped on her head while she was sitting on an airplane, and two in her lower back from mishaps while doing her own stunts.

She co-founded the charity web site "Acting Outlaws" with former Battlestar Galactica co-star Katee Sackhoff; the web site collects donations for several causes and charity events. She is also involved in various causes, from animal rescue to the Deepwater Horizon oil spill. In 2014, she appeared in a PETA video campaign, encouraging cat owners to keep their cats indoors.

Helfer is a vegetarian.

== Filmography ==
=== Film ===
Year	Film	Role	Notes
2000	Eventual Wife	Inga	Short film
2003	White Rush	Eva	
2006	The Genius Club	Ally Simon	
2006	Memory	Stephanie Jacobs	
2007	Spiral	Sasha	
2007	The Green Chain	Leila Cole	
2007	Walk All over Me	Celene	
2008	Inseparable	Rae Wicks	
2009	Green Lantern: First Flight	Boodikka (voice)	Direct-to-video
2009	Open House	Lila	
2010	A Beginner's Guide to Endings	Miranda	
2011	Bloodwork	Dr. Wilcox	
2011	PostHuman	Kali (voice)	Short film
2012	The Forger	Sasha	
2014	37	Christina	
2014	Authors Anonymous	Sigrid Hagenguth	Also known as Strudel
2015	Isolation	Lydia Masterson	
2019	Bombshell	Alisyn Camerota	
2021	Save Ralph	Cottonballs the rabbit (voice)	Short film
2022	Spin Me Round	Sofia	
2024	The Great Salish Heist	Gloria	
2025	Hello Beautiful	Willow	
2025	Primitive War	Sofia Wagner	

=== Television ===
Year	Title	Role	Notes
2002	Jeremiah	Sarah	Episode: "The Long Road: Part 1"
2002	CSI: Crime Scene Investigation	Ashleigh James	Episode: "The Hunger Artist"
2003	Battlestar Galactica	Number Six	Miniseries
2004	Behind the Camera: The Unauthorized Story of Charlie's Angels	Farrah Fawcett	Television film
2004–2009	Battlestar Galactica	Number Six	Main role, 73 episodes
2006	The Collector	Janis Eisner	Episode: "The V.J."
2006	Canada's Next Top Model	Host	Cycle 1
2007	Battlestar Galactica: Razor	Number Six	Television film
2007	Them	Naomi Tyler Moore	Pilot
2007	The Green Chain	Leila Cole	Television film
2007	Supernatural	Molly McNamara	Episode: "Roadkill"
2007–2009	Burn Notice	Carla	Recurring role, 8 episodes
2008–2009	The Spectacular Spider-Man	Felicia Hardy / Black Cat (voice)	3 episodes
2009	Battlestar Galactica: The Plan	Number Six	Television film
2009	Hidden Crimes	Julia Carver	Television film
2009	The Dealership	Rachel Carson	Unsold television pilot
2009	Chuck	Alex Forrest	Episode: "Chuck Versus the Broken Heart"
2009	Warehouse 13	Bonnie Belski	Episode: "Resonance"
2009–2011	Two and a Half Men	Gail	3 episodes
2010	The Super Hero Squad Show	Sif (voice)	Episode: "O, Brother!"
2010	Human Target	Stephanie Dobbs	Episode: "Pilot"
2010	Dark Blue	Alex Rice	Main role (season 2), 10 episodes
2010	Lie to Me	Naomi Russell	Episode: "Double Blind"
2010	The Whole Truth	Bitsie Katz	Episode: "Liars"
2011	No Ordinary Family	Sophie Adler	Episode: "No Ordinary Love"
2011	Scooby-Doo! Mystery Incorporated	Amanda Smyth / Aphrodite (voice)	Episode: "Where Walks Aphrodite"
2011	Franklin & Bash	Brett Caiman	Episode: "Go Tell It on the Mountain"
2011	17th Precinct	Morgana Kurlansky	Unsold television pilot
2011	Mistletoe over Manhattan	Lucy Martel	Television film
2012	The Firm	Alex Clark	Recurring role, 12 episodes
2012	Criminal Minds	Izzy Rogers	2 episodes
2012	Husbands	Pillow Girl #2	2 episodes
2012	Battlestar Galactica: Blood & Chrome	Cylon Prototype	Episode: "Pilot"
2012	Scent of the Missing	Susannah	Television film
2012–2013	Tron: Uprising	The Grid (voice)	19 episodes
2013	Community	Lauren	Episode: "Conventions of Space and Time"
2013	Finding Christmas	Ryan Harrison	Television film
2013	Dangerous Intuition	Kate Aldrich	Television film
2014	Killer Women	Molly Parker	Lead role, 8 episodes
2014	The Librarians	Ms. Willis	Episode: "And the Horns of a Dilemma"
2014	Ascension	Viondra Denninger	Miniseries
2014	Spun Out	Claudia	Episode: "Parental Indiscretion"
2015	Suits	Evan Smith	3 episodes
2015	Key & Peele	Agent Jackson	Episode: "The Job Interview"
2015	Falling Skies	Espheni Queen (voice)	Episode: "Reborn"
2015	Con Man	Louise	4 episodes
2015	Rick and Morty	Donna Gueterman (voice)	Episode: "The Wedding Squanchers"
2016	Powers	FBI Special Agent Angela Lange / Lynx	Recurring role (season 2)
2016	Operation Christmas	Olivia Young Roberts	Television film
2016	Robot Chicken	Kris Monroe / Ms. Delacroix / Colette (voices)	Episode: "Food"
2016–2018, 2020–2021	Lucifer	Charlotte Richards / Mom / Shirley Monroe	Main role (2–3); Guest (5–6)
2017	Sun, Sand and Romance	Kate	Television film
2019	S.W.A.T.	Elle Trask	Episode: "The B-Team"
2019	Creepshow	Lydia Layne	Segment "Lydia Layne's Better Half"
2019–2021	Van Helsing	Dracula / Olivia	Main role (season 4 & 5)
2019	It's Beginning to Look a Lot Like Christmas	Sarah Reed	Hallmark Television Film
2021	Big Shot	Mrs. Grazinsky	Episode: "This Is Our House"
2021	The Rookie	Claire Ivey	Episode: "Five Minutes"
2022	Step Up: High Water	Erin	Recurring role (season 3)
2025	Tomb Raider: The Legend of Lara Croft	Mila (voice)	6 episodes
2026	Carrie	Yet Another Parent	Episode: "Romantic Literature"
2026–present	Anna Pigeon	Molly Pigeon	recurring role

=== Video games ===
Year	Title	Role	Notes
2007	Command & Conquer 3: Tiberium Wars	Kilian Qatar	
2007	Command & Conquer 3: Kane's Wrath	Kilian Qatar	
2008	Spider-Man: Web of Shadows	Felicia Hardy / Black Cat	
2009	Halo 3: ODST	Captain Veronica Dare	
2010	Mass Effect 2	EDI	
2010	StarCraft II: Wings of Liberty	Sarah Kerrigan	
2012–2013	Mass Effect 3	EDI	
2013	StarCraft II: Heart of the Swarm	Sarah Kerrigan	
2015	Mortal Kombat X	Sonya Blade	
2015	StarCraft II: Legacy of the Void	Sarah Kerrigan	
