= Christina Chambers =

American actress and model (born 1969)

- Born: October 24, 1969 (age 56); Alexandria, Virginia, U.S.
- Occupations: Actress, model
- Years active: 1995–2007

Christina Chambers (born October 24, 1969) is an American actress and model.

== Personal life ==
Chambers was born in Alexandria, Virginia, into a family of academics, both parents holding doctorates (her father's in physics and her mother's in mathematics). She is the next-to-youngest of four siblings. Chambers admits to being a tomboy at heart, and has never been very interested in her appearance. Her mother informed her at the age of six when she made her first acting debut that she looked petrified. However, Chambers says she always knew that she'd become an actress.

== Career ==
She studied Shakespeare at The Catholic University of America in Washington, D.C., and spent a semester in Stratford on Avon studying with the Royal Shakespeare Company, where she played the character Goneril in King Lear. After joining the Shenandoah Shakespeare Express she went on tour and played Juliet in Romeo & Juliet.

After leaving the tour, while in New York City, that she took the big step away from Shakespeare. Chambers was spotted by a New York commercial agency who quickly signed her up, and by pure accident ended up signing with a New York modeling agent too. However, it was not until she met her acting agent Peter (who has agencies in New York and Los Angeles) during a New York showcase that her acting career started to accelerate.

Chambers became best known to soap fans as Maria Torres on the NBC soap opera Sunset Beach from 1998 to 1999.

In 2001 Chambers was cast on MTV's first and only soap opera Spyder Games. She played the role of the devious Taylor Jones, who ended being the killer in the murder mystery that carried the show from start to end.

In summer 2004, Chambers was the recast after Lesli Kay left the role of Molly Conlan on As the World Turns. She departed soon after her storyline ended. Also, in 2004, she portrayed actress Jaclyn Smith in Behind the Camera: The Unauthorized Story of Charlie's Angels.

In November 2006, took over the role of Marty Saybrooke on One Life to Live. In September 2007, it was announced that Chambers was let go from One Life to Live after only a year with the soap; she last aired December 4, 2007.

== Filmography ==
- Life 101 (1995), as Linda
- Sunset Beach (1998–1999), as Maria Torres (contract role)
- Scam (2001), as Laura
- Spyder Games (2001), as Taylor
- As the World Turns (2004), as Molly Conlan McKinnon
- Behind the Camera: The Unauthorized Story of Charlie's Angels (2004), as Jaclyn Smith
- Fighting Tommy Riley (2004), as Stephanie
- Two and a Half Men (2005), as Kimberly
- One Life to Live (2006–2007), as Marty Saybrooke
- Cane (2007), as Simone
