= Mutiny (2026 film) =

Film by Jean-François Richet

- Theatrical release poster
- Directed by: Jean-François Richet
- Written by: Lindsay Michel; J. P. Davis
- Produced by: Marc Butan; Jason Statham
- Starring: Jason Statham; Annabelle Wallis; Roland Møller; Adrian Lester
- Cinematography: Brendan Galvin
- Edited by: David Rosenbloom; Joe Rosenbloom
- Music by: Marcus Trumpp
- Production companies: MadRiver Pictures; Punch Palace Productions
- Distributed by: Lionsgate (United States); Sky Cinema (United Kingdom; through StudioCanal)
- Release date: August 21, 2026
- Running time: 95 minutes
- Countries: United Kingdom; United States
- Language: English
- Budget: $40 million
- Box office: $30 million

Mutiny is a 2026 action thriller film starring Jason Statham as a billionaire's head of security who uncovers a conspiracy aboard a cargo ship upon which he is a stowaway. It is directed by Jean-François Richet and written by Lindsay Michel and J. P. Davis. The film also stars Annabelle Wallis, Roland Møller, and Adrian Lester.

Produced by MadRiver Pictures and Punch Palace Productions, the film was released by Lionsgate in the United States and Sky Cinema in the United Kingdom on August 21, 2026. It received mixed reviews from critics.

== Plot ==
Former police officer and commando Cole Reed works in Bangkok as a bodyguard for billionaire shipping magnate and CEO of cargo shipping company KMG, Tibu Campallo. One night while returning from a party, Reed and Tibu are ambushed. Reed kills the attackers, but Tibu dies, tasking Reed with taking care of his son, Kameron. Reed is framed for the murder.

After learning from his friend and contact Taran that Tibu's assassins will be boarding a KMG cargo ship, Artemis, Reed assumes the identity of a dead assassin and boards the ship. Reed encounters Angie Ellis, another KMG employee who was summoned to the ship to replace the assassin Reed assumed the identity of, when they discover a human trafficking operation; Reed frees the hostages before killing a crew member who attacks him after finding the hostages escaping. After discovering that the crew is complicit in the trafficking, Angie sends out a distress signal from the ship that is intercepted by the USS Hazard Perry before being shot in the shoulder and subdued. The hostages are recaptured.

Reed realises that the ship's captain, Marko Madsen, takes orders from Jaran Daniles, who ordered Tibu's assassination to delay the sale of KMG and to have Kameron sell the company to them. After killing most of the crew, Reed engages in a fight with Marko and shoots him with a harpoon gun, killing him. The Hazard Perry arrive at the ship's coordinates and surround Reed, believing he is responsible for Tibu's death, but Angie stops them, lying that Reed died on the ship and that his body was thrown overboard. Angie leaves to return to her family while Reed, no longer on the run after being declared dead, returns to Thailand in a motorboat to find and kill Daniles.

At Tibu's funeral, Reed confronts Kameron, who claims he was used by Daniles and the human traffickers and that they attempted to pressure him into selling KMG to them. Reed reprimands Kameron, saying that he should have informed him of his situation and that he will have to live knowing that his carelessness caused his father's death. Reed leaves to find Daniles with operational help from Taran.

Reed crashes into a car with Daniles inside, kills the driver, and interrogates Daniles. Daniles reveals that Tibu's death gave the company to Kameron and that he planned on having Kameron sell KMG to him so he could inherit the company's wealth and assets. Daniles attempts to bribe Reed in exchange for having his life spared, but Reed executes him, declaring that what he wants is "vengeance", and leaves.

== Cast ==
- Jason Statham as Cole Reed
- Annabelle Wallis as Angie Ellis
- Jason Wong as Taran
- Roland Møller as Captain Marko Madsen
- Arnas Fedaravicius as Mateo Pineda
- Adrian Lester as Captain Adam Spencer
- Ramon Tikaram as Tibu Campallo
- Chaneil Kular as Kameron Campallo
- Simon Kluth as Jaran Daniles

== Production ==
Mutiny was produced by Jason Statham's production company Punch Palace Productions and MadRiver Pictures with a script written by Lindsay Michel and J. P. Davis. The project had Statham attached to star and Jean-François Richet to direct going into the 2024 Cannes Film Market. In September 2024, Annabelle Wallis was cast to lead opposite Statham. In October, Jason Wong joined the cast. The casting of Roland Møller as the film's antagonist as well as Arnas Fedaravičius, and Adrian Lester was announced in November.

Principal photography began in September 2024 in the United Kingdom. Part of filming locked down the entrance to One Canada Square at Canary Wharf. Additional filming took place in Malta, and ultimately wrapped on November 25.

Marcus Trumpp composed the score for the film.

== Release ==
Mutiny was released in the United States on August 21, 2026. It was previously scheduled to be released on January 9, 2026.

Lionsgate acquired the project for North American distribution before the 2024 Cannes Film Market, where it remained for sale in other regions. Just like with The Beekeeper, Sky acquired the distribution rights for the United Kingdom through StudioCanal for a theatrical release as well as on Sky Cinema, while The Veterans will handle international sales for the film.

On August 19, 2026, Amazon accidentally leaked the full movie briefly to their streaming service which remained up for hours, angering film buyers.

== Reception ==
On the review aggregator website Rotten Tomatoes, 50% of 125 critics' reviews are positive, with an average rating of 5.2/10. The website’s consensus reads: "Mutiny offers up a bounty of crunchy carnage that Jason Statham serves with characteristic finesse, but convoluted plotting and an unrelentingly grim tone weigh down this action flick's fun factor like an anchor." Metacritic, which uses a weighted average, assigned the film a score of 52 out of 100, based on 25 critics, indicating "mixed or average" reviews. Audiences polled by CinemaScore gave the film an average grade of "B+" on an A+ to F scale.
