= Nordlit =

- Discipline: Scandinavian studies
- Language: Danish, English, French, German, Norwegian, Swedish
- Edited by: Linda Nesby, Henrik Johnsson, Andreas Klein, Ingri Løkholm Ramberg, Monica Grini

Publication details
- History: 1997–present
- Publisher: Septentrio Academic Publishing on behalf of the University of Tromsø (Norway)
- Frequency: Biannually
- Open access: Yes
- License: Creative Commons Attribution 4.0 International Licence

Standard abbreviations
- ISO 4: Nordlit

Indexing
- ISSN: 0809-1668 (print); 1503-2086 (web)
- LCCN: 2006208617
- OCLC no.: 605947805

Links
- Journal homepage; Online archive

Nordlit is a Norwegian academic journal that publishes articles on Nordic literature and culture. Most issues are multilingual—including English, French, and German, as well as Norwegian, Swedish, and Danish. The journal is published by Septentrio Academic Publishing on behalf of the University of Tromsø. It has a specific focus on Arctic themes and border studies, as well as Scandinavian literature. The editors-in-chief are Linda Nesby, Henrik Johnsson, Andreas Klein, Ingri Løkholm Ramberg, and Monica Grini (University of Tromsø).

The name Nordlit is a paronomasia: in Norwegian, nordlys means northern lights, and the suffix -lit refers to literature.

== Abstracting and indexing ==
The journal is abstracted and indexed in the Modern Language Association Database. The journal is a level 1 publication in the Norwegian scientific rating system.
