= Glynnis Talken Campbell =

American novelist

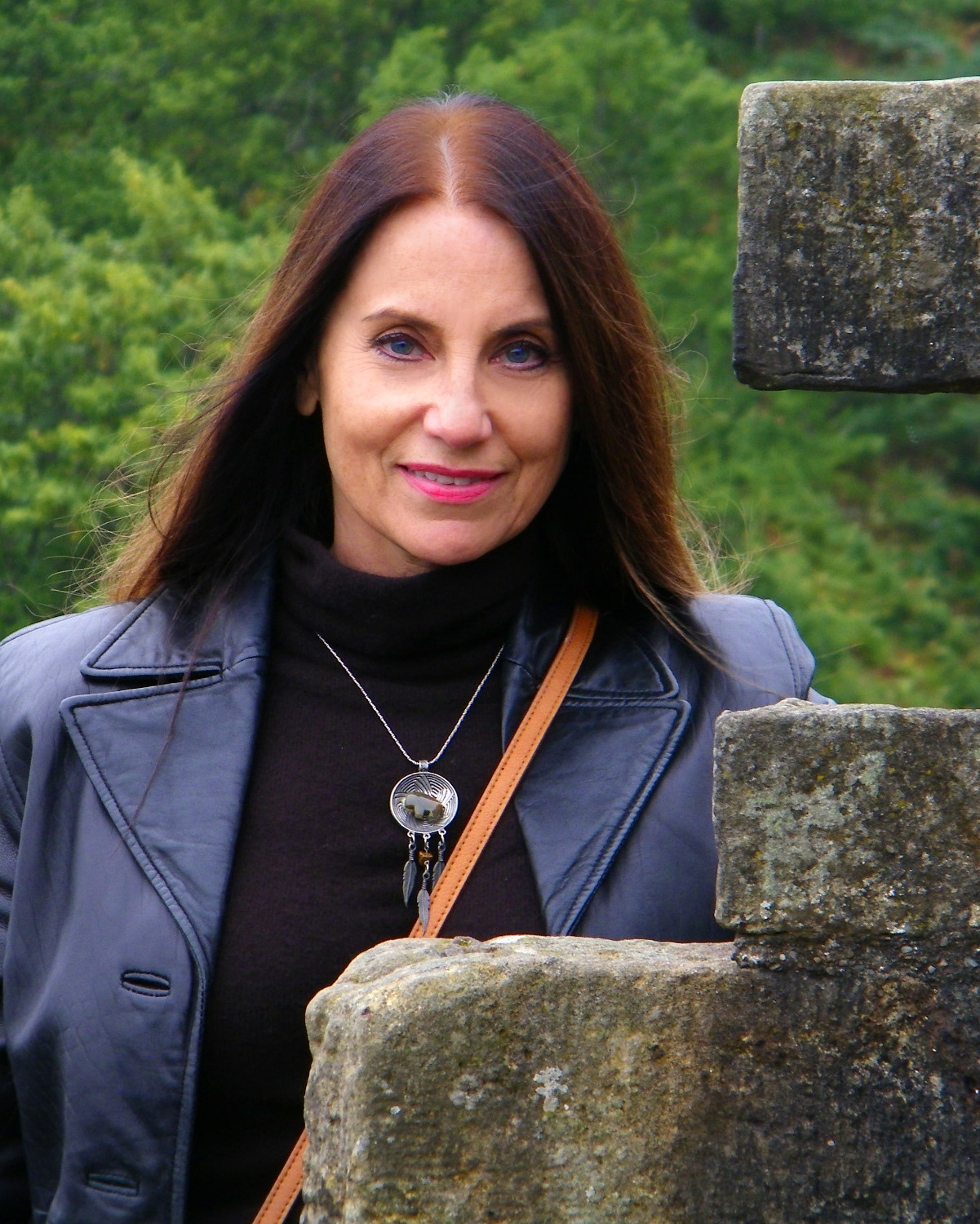
- Campbell at Castle Campbell, near Dollar, Scotland, in 2014
- Born: Glynnis Gail Talken; June 12, 1957 (age 69); Chico, California, U.S.
- Education: California State University, Chico
- Occupations: Author; voiceover actress; composer; musician
- Spouse: Richard Campbell (1983–present)
- Writing career
- Pen name: Glynnis Campbell, Sarah McKerrigan, Kira Morgan
- Language: English
- Years active: 1986–present
- Period: 2000–present
- Genre: Historical Romance
- Notable awards: USA Today Bestseller

Glynnis Talken Campbell (born Glynnis Gail Talken on June 12, 1957, in Chico, California) is an American historical romance author, composer, musician and voice actress, and is married to bass guitarist Richard Campbell. Glynnis Campbell graduated from California State University, Chico with a degree in Vocal Music Performance. Her first novel, My Champion, was nominated for a Romance Writers of America's RITA award for Best First Book and Best Long Historical Romance in 2001. In 2009, her novel Danger's Kiss, received the "Book Buyers Best Award for Historical Romance." She has also written under the pen names Sarah McKerrigan and Kira Morgan.

== Career ==
After college, Glynnis Talken joined the Los Angeles-based all-girl rock band The Pinups, signed to CBS records. After a short time, she left the band, but quickly found work doing voice-overs while composing scores with her husband for Coronet Films. She was given the role of Julie Winters in an MTV animated series based on a graphic novel called The Maxx. Campbell has said the staff of computer games company Blizzard Entertainment saw this performance and requested her services to add voice-overs for a collection of characters from Diablo and StarCraft. Her moody work with the voiceover for Sarah Kerrigan was instrumental in setting the game's atmosphere and for developing the plot. A Womengamers.com online review of computer game characters gave the voice an 8.4/10 rating and described the character as "one of the best-sounding women ever to come out of a computer game".

Besides voice acting, Campbell is a historical romance novel writer and has been nominated for a number of literature awards. Originally published by Berkley Books in 2000 with the novels, My Champion, My Warrior, and My Hero, in 2005 she began writing for Warner Books under a pseudonym, Sarah McKerrigan, in homage to the character she voiced in StarCraft. Under that name, she published Lady Danger in April 2006, Captive Heart in October 2006, Knight's Prize in May 2007, and Danger's Kiss in May 2008.

In 2010, Campbell started writing under a new pseudonym, Kira Morgan, for Hachette Book Group USA. Her romance novel, Captured By Desire, is set in Mary, Queen of Scots-era Scotland, and was released August 2010, followed by Seduced by Destiny in March 2011.

Beginning in 2012, she returned to writing under her real name of Glynnis Campbell, releasing her first self-published eBook, a Scottish historical romance novel Passion's Exile, followed by The Shipwreck, The Outcast, Native Gold, Native Wolf, Native Hawk, The Handfasting, The Reiver, The Outcast, Desire's Ransom, MacKenzie's Lass, The Storming, A Yuletide Kiss, A Rivenloch Christmas, The Stowaway, and Bride of Fire. She became a USA Today bestselling author with her book in the collection Romance to the Rescue.

== Voiceover parts ==
Characters recorded by Campbell for Knowledge Adventure/Blizzard Entertainment games include:

- The Rogue from Diablo
- Gillian the Barmaid from Diablo
- Kashya from Diablo II
- Sarah Kerrigan from Starcraft, StarCraft: Brood War
- Dryad from WarCraft 3
- Various from JumpStart 1st Grade

Campbell also voiced Julie Winters in the animated television adaptation of The Maxx. She worked extensively on a collection of audiobooks for Time Warner including those in the Star Wars Tales of the Jedi and Dark Empire series.

== Bibliography ==
=== The Warrior Maids of Rivenloch ===
- The Shipwreck - Self-published 2013 (Prequel novella)
- A Yuletide Kiss - Self-published 2017 (Novella)
- Lady Danger - Warner Books 2005
- Captive Heart - Warner Books 2006
- Knight's Prize - Grand Central Publishing 2007
- A Rivenloch Christmas - Self-published 2019 (Novella)

=== The Warrior Daughters of Rivenloch ===
- Bride of Fire - Self-published 2019

=== The Knights of de Ware ===
- The Handfasting - Self-published 2015 (Prequel novella)
- My Champion - Berkley Books 2000 - RITA Nominee for Best First Book and Best Long Historical Romance
- My Warrior - Berkley Books 2001
- My Hero - Berkley Books 2002

=== Medieval Outlaws ===
- The Reiver - Self-published 2017 (Prequel novella)
- Danger's Kiss - Grand Central Publishing 2008
- Passion's Exile - Self-published 2012
- Desire's Ransom - Self-published 2017

=== Scottish Lasses ===
- The Outcast - Self-published 2015 (Prequel novella)
- Captured By Desire - Hachette Book Group USA 2010
- Seduced By Destiny - Hachette Book Group USA 2011
- MacFarland's Lass - Self-published 2011
- MacAdam's Lass - Self-published 2011
- MacKenzie's Lass - Self-published 2016

=== California Legends ===
- The Stowaway - Self-published 2019 (Prequel novella)
- Native Gold - Self-published 2013
- Native Wolf - Self-published 2015
- Native Hawk - Self-published 2016

=== Other works ===
- A Knight's Vow - Berkley Books 2002 (Anthology)
- The Dirty Word - Self-published 2017
- Mom's in the Hospital! What Do I Do? - Self-published 2013

== Film music composition ==
- The Plasma Membrane by Coronet (Firm); Bill Walker Productions. VHS video : NTSC color broadcast system, Language: English, Publisher: St. Louis, Mo. : Coronet/MTI Film & Video; [Rochester, N.Y.] : Dist. by Ward's Natural Science Establishment, Inc., ©1988.
- Cell Biology : the Living Cell by Coronet/MTI Film and Video. VHS video:Partial animation, Language: English, Publisher: Columbus, OH : Coronet/MTI Film & Video, ©1988.
- Your Active Body : Bones and Movement by Mel Waskin; Ellen Bowen; Bob Gronowski; Matt Newman; Joel Marks; Bill Walker Productions.; Coronet (Firm); Coronet/MTI Film and Video.; VHS video : Partial animation : Elementary and junior high school, Language: English, Publisher: Northbrook, Ill. : Coronet/MTI Film and Video, ©1988.
- Light by Eric R Russell; Sabrina Plisco-Morris; Judy Berlin; Kenneth J Kligerman; Glynnis Campbell; Richard Campbell; Barr Films.; VHS video: Elementary and junior high school, Language: English, Publisher: Irwindale, CA : Barr Films, ©1986.
- Wonder World of Science by Bill Walker Productions.; Coronet/MTI Film and Video.; Animation of Arizona. Video : Partial animation: Primary school, Language: English, Publisher: Northbrook, IL : Coronet, 1989.
- Does It Ever Rain in the Desert? by Coronet (Firm); Bill Walker Productions.; Coronet/MTI Film and Video.; VHS video : Beta : Primary school: U-matic, Language: English, Publisher: Deerfield, IL : Coronet/MTI Film & Video, 1987.
- Global Winds by Mel Waskin; Coronet (Firm); Bill Walker Productions.; VHS video, Language: English, Publisher: Deerfield, Ill. : Coronet, 1985.
- What's the Brightest Star in the Sky? by Mel Waskin; Bill Walker Productions.; Coronet (Firm); Coronet/MTI Film and Video.; VHS video : Partial animation : Primary school, Language: English, Publisher: Northbrook, IL : Coronet/MTI Film & Video, ©1993.
- Atmospheric Science : The Earth, Atmospheric Science : The Earth's Atmosphere; Atmospheric Science : Winds and Air Currentsby Bill Walker Productions.; Coronet (Firm); BioMedia Associates.; Video : Partial animation : Preschool, Language: English, Publisher: Northbrook, IL: Coronet/MTI Film & Video, [1991]
- Where Do Lost Balloons Go? by Coronet (Firm); Bill Walker Productions.; Coronet/MTI Film and Video.; VHS video : Beta : Partial animation: Primary school : U-matic, Language: English, Publisher: Deerfield, IL : Coronet/MTI Film & Video, 1986.
