= The Regional Office is Under Attack! =

2016 novel by Manuel Gonzales

- Author: Manuel Gonzales
- Language: English
- Genre: Science fiction, fantasy
- Publisher: Riverhead Books
- Publication date: April 12, 2016
- Publication place: United States
- Pages: 400 pp
- Website: Penguin Random House

The Regional Office is Under Attack! is a 2016 debut novel by Manuel Gonzales. It is his second book. Like his 2014 story collection The Miniature Wife, the novel was published by Riverhead/Penguin Random House.

== Plot ==
The Regional Office, an organization of super-powered female assassins that protects the world from annihilation, comes under attack from enemies led by Rose, a former Regional Office assassin. While many of the organization's members are defeated, Sarah, an assassin raised by the organization from childhood after her mother's disappearance, continues to defend the Regional Office. As she battles against the attackers, Sarah uncovers the secrets behind the Regional Office's origins, and learns the reasons for her mother's disappearance.

== Reception ==
The book received mixed reviews from critics. Kelly Braffet of The New York Times praised the satirical take on superhero stories, calling the book "rollicking good fun on the surface, action-packed and shiny in all the right places" but also "thoughtful and well considered". Jason Heller of NPR expressed disappointment that the book "promises to be a treasure chest of oddities, weirdness and wonders" but "simply fails to unpack them". The Guardian reviewer Josephine Livingstone observed that the book was "not the subtlest or most literary ever written" but concluded that "the emotional currents flowing beneath and through Gonzales’s blockbuster action scenes are remarkably well rendered". Constance Grady of Vox called the book "a frothy and ass-kicking delight that’s a pure pleasure to read", but lamented that it was "so rich with post-modern irony, that it has a hard time finding a well of sincerity".

== Adaptation ==
Shortly after the book's publication, MadRiver Pictures acquired the film rights in order to develop a comedy project directed by Ruben Fleischer.
