= Artan =

Artan may refer to:

- Artan (given name)

Surname

- Ibrahim Artan Ismail, Somali Puntland politician
- Ahmed Ibrahim Artan, Somali diplomat, author and politician
- Engin Ali Artan (born 1992), Turkish figure skater
- Louis Artan (1837–1890), Dutch-Belgian painter and etcher who specialized in seascapes
- Omar Artan (born 1992), Somali football referee

Other

- Artan River, right tributary of the river Crișul Alb in Romania
- Artan Unit, a Ukrainian special forces unit

== See also ==
- Artana (disambiguation)
- Artane (disambiguation)
- Artanes (disambiguation)
- Artanis (disambiguation)
- Artian
