= Characters of the StarCraft series =

Characters from the StarCraft series in promotional artwork released for the media franchise's 20th anniversary in 2018. From left to right: Sarah Kerrigan, Jim Raynor, Tassadar, Zeratul, Nova Terra, and Alexei Stukov; Kate Lockwell, Raszagal, the Overmind and Gabriel Tosh appear on monitors in the background, with Zerglings and Protoss Probes also depicted.

The story of the StarCraft series revolves around interstellar affairs in a distant sector of the galaxy, where three species are vying for supremacy: the Terrans, a highly factionalised future version of humanity; the Protoss, a theocratic race of vast psionic ability; and the Zerg, an insectoid species connected through a hive mind. The latter two of these species were genetically engineered by an ancient precursor series known as the Xel'Naga.

The series was begun with Blizzard Entertainment's 1998 video game StarCraft, and has been expanded with sequels Insurrection, Retribution, Brood War, Ghost, Wings of Liberty, Heart of the Swarm, and Legacy of the Void. The franchise has been further extended with a series of novels, graphic novels, and other works.

Major and recurring characters from the military science fiction series StarCraft are listed below, organised by respective species and most commonly affiliated faction within the fictional universe. Seventeen characters from StarCraft universe appear as playable heroes within crossover multiplayer online battle arena game, Heroes of the Storm. All the three races—Terrans, Protoss, and the Zerg—have been represented in the game.

== Casting and design ==
Extensive concept art was done for the lore of the series.

The characters and story of the StarCraft series were created by Chris Metzen and James Phinney. However, as Phinney was not involved in StarCraft: Brood War, Chris Metzen alone is credited for the development of the plot in the expansion. Despite the series success globally, particularly in South Korea, Blizzard Entertainment has not made any major comments regarding the development of the characters and the storyline of the StarCraft series.

However, interviews with two of the voice actors have given a glimpse into small parts of the development process. An interview with Robert Clotworthy, the voice of Jim Raynor in all released StarCraft games to date, has revealed that for the most part the voicing for the characters was done over only a few days in sessions of up to four hours, a fact mirrored in a similar interview with Sarah Kerrigan's actress, Glynnis Talken Campbell. Clotworthy also stated how the concept art for the game usually used for the visual development of characters and locales in games was used by him in order to develop the personality of his character.

Visually, most of the characters and units in the games were developed from artwork by Metzen and Samwise Didier, although at least two other artists—Glenn Rane and Peter Lee—have developed concept art for StarCraft II. It is also implied by some of the authors of the novels that the development of the characters in their books was influenced by Metzen as well as Andy Chambers and Evelyn Fredericksen. This is particularly notable for characters later appearing in the games, such as Valerian Mengsk.

== Main characters ==
=== Jim Raynor ===
- Voiced by Robert Clotworthy

Jim Raynor is the primary Terran protagonist and player character in the StarCraft franchise. A former colonial marshal on the backwater planet of Mar Sara, Raynor joins Arcturus Mengsk's revolutionaries The Sons of Korhal alongside Mar Sara's former colonial magistrate in their fight against corrupt and oppressive Terran Confederacy, where he develops a relationship with Sarah Kerrigan, Mengsk's second in command. However, he quickly comes to realise that Mengsk is far from the force for good when he sacrifices Kerrigan and the entire population of the Confederate capital world of Tarsonis to the Zerg to satisfy his own thirst for power. Disillusioned and embittered, Raynor deserts Mengsk and becomes a persona non grata in the new Terran Dominion. He later discovers that Kerrigan is assimilated and incorporated into the Zerg Swarm. After desertion, Raynor and his forces take part in major combat operations across the Koprulu Sector: He fights alongside the Protoss templar Tassadar in the battle that leads to the fall of the Zerg ruler, the Overmind, and splinters the Zerg into several factions. When the expeditionary forces of United Earth Directorate (UED) arrive in the sector to subjugate it, Raynor, Mengsk, and Kerrigan combine their Terran, Zerg, and Protoss allies to repel the invasion. No sooner than they fall, the alliance shatters.

Four years later, Raynor's rebel movement is contracted by a group called the Moebius Foundation to recover pieces of a Xel'Naga artifact which is ultimately used on Char by a combined force of Raynor's Raiders and Terran Dominion expeditionary fleet to deinfest the Queen of Blades, restoring Sarah Kerrigan's humanity. After her deinfestation, Kerrigan is relentlessly pursued by Arcturus Mengsk; during one such raid Arcturus's Dominion forces capture and allegedly summarily execute the rebel commander. It is later revealed that Raynor was not in fact executed, but held prisoner as a hostage to keep Kerrigan in line. After being freed from his prison Raynor assists Kerrigan as she storms the Dominion capital of Augustgrad on the planet Korhal After a showdown with Arcturus Mengsk inside his Palace, Kerrigan manages to gain the upper hand with help from James Raynor, and kills Arcturus by overloading his body with psychic energy, causing him to explode. In Legacy of the Void, Raynor and his Raiders are now part of the Dominion military under the new Emperor Valerian, and with the aid of Artanis and his protoss forces, defend Korhal from an attack by Amon. Joining with Artanis and Kerrigan later on, Raynor watches as Kerrigan ascends to become a Xel'naga and destroys Amon once and for all; two years later, Kerrigan – in human form – visits Raynor at the bar on Mar Sara where he began in Wings of Liberty, and he leaves with her. He is not seen or heard from again.

StarCraft creator Chris Metzen designed Raynor as a rough-living and dangerous man; Clotworthy describes Raynor as a man who other characters "wouldn't mess with". Nevertheless, his depiction is meant to be that of an ordinary man. Critics connected sympathetically with Raynor's plights, and GameSpot named him one of the best heroes in video gaming.

Raynor also appears as a playable character in Heroes of the Storm.

=== Sarah Kerrigan ===
- Voiced by Glynnis Talken Campbell in StarCraft; by Tricia Helfer in StarCraft II; by Vanessa Marshall in Heroes of the Storm.

Sarah Kerrigan is the primary Zerg protagonist and player character in the StarCraft franchise. Kerrigan serves as the primary antagonist of all but the first and last two games. As "The Primal Queen of Blades", Kerrigan is the de facto leader of the Zerg Swarm and mentor to broodmother Zagara.

Originally a Terran ghost agent for Arcturus Mengsk, she is betrayed and abandoned to the Zerg, who transform her into a Terran/Zerg hybrid with vast psionic powers under the control of the then unknown Amon. Following the death of the Overmind, Kerrigan asserts her independence, striking out at those who betrayed her and who seek to contain her, eventually taking control of the entire Zerg Swarm. Four years later, Kerrigan invades the Dominion in search of a number of Xel'Naga artifacts; these artifacts are instead retrieved by Raynor at the behest of the Moebius Foundation, who assembles them into a device that reverts Kerrigan to a human and releases Amon's grip on her. After her deinfestation, Kerrigan is mercilessly pursued by Arcturus Mengsk, however she successfully escapes Arcturus's Dominion forces. After willingly allowing herself to be reinfested on Zerus, Kerrigan is reborn as the Primal Queen of Blades, after which she successfully reunites the Zerg Swarm and storms the Dominion capital of Augustgrad on the planet Korhal with help from Raynor's Raiders. After a showdown with Arcturus Mengsk inside his Palace, Kerrigan manages to gain the upper hand with help from James Raynor, and kills Arcturus by overloading his body with psychic energy, causing him to explode spectacularly. In the aftermath of her victory, Kerrigan gathers the Swarm and departs in search of Amon.

According to Zeratul, Kerrigan factors prominently into a Xel'Nagan prophecy concerning the Zerg, the Protoss, and the Hybrids. Heart of the Swarm reveals that Kerrigan is the only being powerful enough to stop the fallen Xel'naga Amon, though exactly how is not revealed. Though originally intended as a throwaway character, Kerrigan grew on the developers, who gave her a greater role in the series. Talken Campbell described Kerrigan's transformation as "going from good girl to bad girl"; many of the aspects of Kerrigan's infested character design are inspired by the Greek gorgon Medusa. IGN rated Kerrigan as the fifth most memorable video game villain, while readers of GameSpot put Kerrigan as the most evil video game villain.

During the events of Legacy of the Void, Kerrigan enters into an alliance with Artanis while investigating the Xel'Naga homeworld Ulnar. Some time after Artanis's reclamation of the Protoss homeworld of Aiur, Kerrigan sends a psionic call to Raynor and Artanis for assistance in permanently killing Amon in the Void. During the joint Terran Dominion/Zerg/Protoss assault of the Void, the full context of Zeratul's prophecy about Kerrigan is made clear: Only a fellow Xel'Naga is capable of killing Amon, and only Kerrigan is capable of ascension. With the remainder of the joint armada, Kerrigan is successful in killing Amon during her psychic backlash in the void. During the aftermath, Kerrigan returns to Raynor in human form and disappears.

Kerrigan also appears as a playable character in Heroes of the Storm.

=== Artanis ===
- Voiced by Patrick Seitz in StarCraft II and Heroes of the Storm

Artanis is the primary Protoss protagonist and player character in the StarCraft franchise. Artanis is a high templar and a military commander introduced in Brood War. Later retcons, particularly with the character's appearances in the novels Queen of Blades and Twilight, have established Artanis as the identity of the nameless 'Executor' for the Protoss campaign in the original StarCraft.

An ambitious leader, Artanis is the youngest templar to achieve the rank of praetor and executor. Artanis holds Tassadar in high esteem and despite being a strong believer in Khalai system, he also holds to the idea of reunification with the Nerazim and Tal'Darim. Artanis is responsible for the initial defense of Aiur alongside Fenix before being dispatched to arrest Tassadar by Aldaris; Artanis, however, sides with Tassadar and helps him defeat the Overmind. Artanis later organizes the evacuation of his now devastated home world of Aiur, and with Zeratul undertakes measures to cleanse the Zerg presence on Shakuras through the use of a Xel'Naga temple. When Sarah Kerrigan's actions result in the deaths of Aldaris, Fenix, and Raszagal, Artanis commands a fleet to bring Kerrigan to justice on Char, and despite allying with both the Dominion and the UED remnants, his forces are defeated by her Zerg. Artanis returns to Shakuras to rebuild the Protoss civilization; with Zeratul having disappeared, Artanis becomes the hierarch of the unified Protoss Protectorate, the Daelaam, but struggles with reintegrating the two estranged branches of his people, with many of the Aiur survivors desiring to retake their home world. He makes a brief appearance in Wings of Liberty in the vision of the Protoss's last stand against the hybrids and their Zerg swarm.

Artanis is the central character of Legacy of the Void, the third and final part of StarCraft II. He leads the Protoss to invade Aiur but as the invasion went on, many Protoss fell under Amon's control. Amon has seized the Khala and is controlling the Protoss via their nerve cords. Artanis initially fell under their control but Zeratul severed his nerve cord, dying in the process. Shortly afterwards, Artanis leaves Aiur behind in the ship Spear of Adun and begins his quest to destroy Amon. Upon repelling Amon from Aiur, Artanis joins Raynor and Kerrigan in destroying Amon and his forces in the void. During the aftermath, Artanis maintains a peaceful alliance with Valerian Mengsk's dominion.

Artanis also appears as a playable character in Heroes of the Storm.

=== Zeratul ===
- Voiced by Jack Ritschel in StarCraft and StarCraft: Brood War; Fred Tatasciore in StarCraft II.

Zeratul is a Nerazim prelate and one of the main Protoss protagonists. A renowned psionic warrior and assassin, Zeratul is somewhat secretive and calculating, but is nevertheless honorable and loyal to his species. He teaches Tassadar how to use dark templar energies and facilitates the final attack on the Overmind by slaying several cerebrates. Following the death of the Overmind, Zeratul tries to put in motion the reunification of the Khalai survivors with the wayward dark templar and unmask the secrets of Samir Duran's experiments. After Duran revealed he had been breeding Protoss-Zerg hybrids for a greater master, Zeratul set out to find Duran's master and his plan, which encompasses all of his activities in the three installments of StarCraft II. In Wings of Liberty, he gives Jim Raynor a crystal with his memories to emphasize the importance of the latter's mission to de-infest Kerrigan. In Heart of the Swarm, he guides Kerrigan to Zerus, the original home of the Zerg, and encourages her to re-infest herself so she can stop Amon, a fallen Xel'naga who is revealed to be the master of Duran and seeks to destroy all life in the Korpulu Sector and remold it in his image. Zeratul also features in the events of Legacy of the Void (originally believed to be the central character, the actual protagonist of the story is Artanis). He appears early on but is killed as he severs Artanis's nerve cords to cut him off from Amon's control. He is described by GameSpot as a "dark warrior who champions the light" and a "willing scapegoat" for his people and ranked in their top ten heroes chart.

The character of Zeratul was created by Blizzard Entertainment's Chris Metzen, with concept art produced by other Blizzard artists such as Samwise Didier. Chris Metzen mentioned that Ritschel died some time during the development of the game, and thus Fred Tatasciore has taken over as the new voice actor. Tatasciore described Zeratul as an incredible character, a "Darth Vader" who invests so much in the survival of things, and one of the best characters he has ever played. GameSpot described all the characters in StarCraft as "three-dimensional, full of personality and complexity", and then continued to comment: "Yet even among this star-studded cast, it is Zeratul who stands out as the most noble of heroes, although he is shrouded in a cloak of mystery and aloofness".

Zeratul also appears as a playable character in Heroes of the Storm.

=== Nova ===
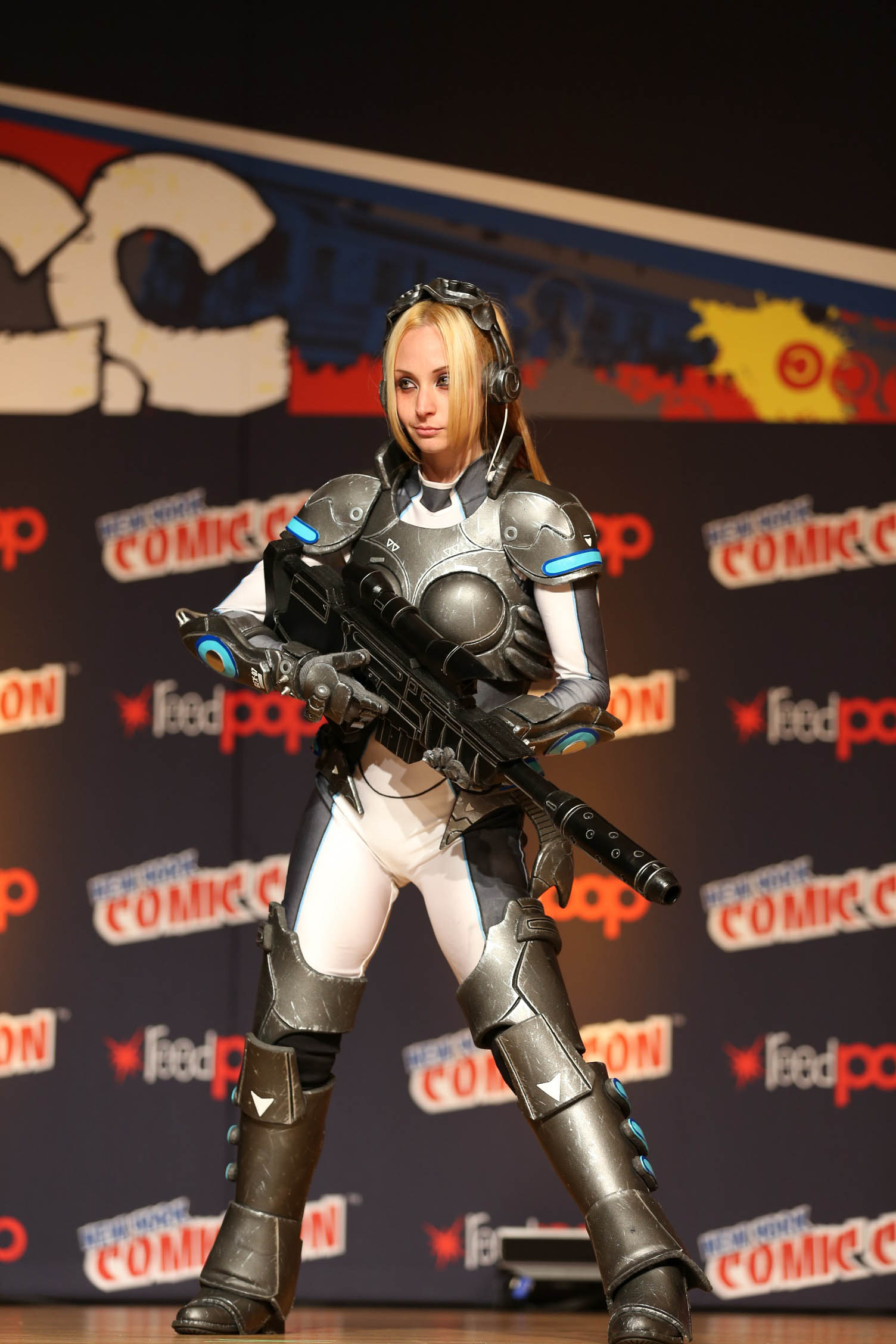
Cosplayer portraying Nova.

- Voiced by Grey DeLisle

November Annabella Terra, call sign "Nova", a.k.a. "Agent X41822N", is a ghost agent and the protagonist of the StarCraft: Ghost sub-series. Despite the indefinite postponement of the Ghost video game, she appears in Wings of Liberty and Heart of the Swarm, as well as a series of novels, including StarCraft Ghost: Nova and StarCraft Ghost: Spectres. Nova is the subject of her own RTS campaign, Nova Covert Ops, which was released on March 29, 2016.

Nova is the daughter of one of the highly influential Confederate Old Families; despite having unusually high psionic potential her father prevents her from being taken into the Confederate Ghost Program. However, after her family is murdered by an anti-Confederate resistance movement, Nova flees to the undercity of Tarsonis, where she is forced to work as an organized crime enforcer. Nova is rescued during the Zerg invasion of Tarsonis, and ends up in the possession of the newly formed Terran Dominion, who train her as a ghost. At her request, her memories are erased.

She mostly appears in StarCraft series, as a minor antagonist. She initially appeared in StarCraft II: Wings of Liberty, as the source of the mysterious encrypted message that warns Jim Raynor of what Gabriel Tosh is planning: a revival of Project Shadowblade, a program in which Ghosts are given doses of jorium and terrazine to produce Spectres, giving them power but ended the subjects insane. She offers Ghosts for the Raiders to train, in turn she will eliminate the Project Shadowblade and Tosh. If declined, she just warned Raynor and cut off the transmission. In Heart of the Swarm, she led the assault team to capture Kerrigan, Raynor and Prince Valerian. She captured Raynor.

In the Nova Covert Ops, set in postwar Koprulu, she was captured by the mysterious organisation Defenders of Man, a secret group that wants to overthrow Emperor Valerian. She and her Ghost team was captured, used to attack Antiga Prime via psi emitters, and wipes their memories. The team escaped and Nova was captured by Admiral Matt Horner. While holding a feral zerg siege, she was tasked by Horner to assist the defenders. They later met the Emperor, and gave her the Covert Ops Crew, consisting of Reigel and a handful of volunteers. With this, the team tries to foil the Defenders of Man's actions, hesitantly allied with Highlord Alarak to take down Defenders of Man and regain her memories via terrazine, and point him where the Defenders of Man headquartered. After the capture of Carolina Davis, the leader of the Defenders, Alarak attacks them with the Death Fleet. The Dominion and the Defenders joined to repel the invasion. Carolina escapes and tried to destroy the shipyard that houses the Dominion fleet. Nova and her team defeated her, and she killed the Defenders general. Instead of capturing her and the team, Emperor Valerian lets them go.

Nova also appears as a playable character in the crossover video game Heroes of the Storm. In the game, she is a ranged assassin who can ambush enemies from stealth. Her strongest point is her exceptional long-ranged single-target burst damage. In addition, she is able to use "holographic decoys" to confuse and distract the enemy, as one of her three primary abilities. Her baseline ability "ghost protocol" can be activated to instantly grant stealth to Nova. "Triple Tap" and "Precision Strike" with global range, are her two heroic abilities. Nova is one of the six Blizzard characters who appear in the Heroes of the Storm cinematic trailer.

In the team-based shooter Overwatch, there is a Nova skin for the playable character Widowmaker.

== Terran characters ==
The Terrans of the Koprulu sector are descended from the survivors of a disastrous 23rd century colonization mission from Earth. Compared to the Protoss and Zerg, the Terrans are technologically inferior, lacking in genetic-diversity, and highly factionalized, but possesses psionic potential. The seven dominant terran government factions are the Moebius Foundation, the Kel-Morian Combine, the Tarsonis Republic, the Mar Sara Republic, the Terran Dominion (formerly the Terran Confederacy), the Umojan Protectorate, and the United Earth Directorate. Terrans are in a constant state of conflict: whenever they are not caught in the two-front pitched battle crossfire with their alien neighbors' interstellar conflicts, they endure frequent political assassinations, civil wars, and revolutions amongst themselves. Nevertheless, Terran ingenuity and unyielding stubbornness have helped elevate them as one of the three dominant species of the galaxy.

=== Raynor's Raiders ===
Raynor's Raiders are a Terran rebel group led by former Confederate marshal Jim Raynor and based aboard the battlecruiser Hyperion. Originally descended from Raynor's Rangers which joined the Sons of Korhal in the Terran campaign of the 1998 video game StarCraft, the Raiders defected when Arcturus Mengsk crowned himself Emperor of the Terran Dominion.

The Hyperion crew in Wings of Liberty includes Raynor's second-in-command Matt Horner, engineer Rory Swann, scientist Egon Stetmann, Raynor's old friend Tychus Findlay, and engineer Milo Kachinsky. Graven Hill serves as the liaison for the Raiders to recruit mercenaries on the Hyperion. Other notable members include Gabriel Tosh and Ariel Hanson, who may join Raynor's Raiders during optional campaign branches. Numerous other named characters, such as technicians Earl and Annabelle Thatcher, appear among the Raiders' personnel but play minor roles in the game's narrative.

The Raiders are the central Terran faction of StarCraft II and its internal dynamics form a major part of Wings of Liberty's narrative. Raynor's idealism is contrasted against Horner's military pragmatism, Swann's technical expertise, Stetmann's scientific enthusiasm, and Tychus's mercenary outlook. Their campaign aboard the Hyperion establishes the Terran perspective of the Second Great War and continues into later StarCraft II campaigns.

==== Matt Horner ====
- Voiced by Brian Bloom

Matt Horner is the captain of the Raiders' flagship Hyperion and Raynor's second-in-command. Described as "young and idealistic" and guided by strong moral principles, Horner is originally a supporter of Mengsk, but becomes disgusted by Mengsk's deliberate attacks on civilian Confederate targets. Having come to admire Raynor's bravery and loyalty, Horner follows Raynor when he abandons Mengsk's cause, and is keen to strike at the morally bankrupt Terran Dominion. Horner is only an average combatant in personal combat, but is otherwise an excellent pilot and tactician. First introduced in the novel Queen of Blades, Horner commands the Hyperion as it comes under attack from Zerg in orbit of the planet Char and is forced to withdraw from the system, leaving Raynor and a small group of Raiders stranded on the surface; Horner is only able to return several months later to evacuate the survivors. Horner continues in a similar role in Wings of Liberty, acting as Raynor's conscience and trying to keep his commander focused. After the capture of James Raynor by Arcturus's Dominion forces in Heart of the Swarm, Matt Horner assumes temporary command of Raynor's Raiders, leading the rebel movement for much of the game until Raynor's return to the Hyperion after the raid aboard the prison ship Moros. By the events of Legacy of the Void, Horner joins the Dominion as an admiral, coordinating the joint Dominion/protoss fleet against Amon and his Moebius Corps forces. After Amon falls, Horner becomes the Dominion's chief military leader, as he and Emperor Valerian pledge to maintain peace and prosperity for the Dominion.

==== Rory Swann ====
- Voiced by Fred Tatasciore

Rory Swann is the chief engineer of the Hyperion. Swann came from a family of tech-savvy miners who opened a successful private mining operation on Meinhoff: however, their operation was crushed by ever-rising taxes. Swann lodged a complaint to the Kel-Morian Combine officials and discovered that Tavish Kerr, whose mining operations weren't burdened with taxes, bribed officials to put rival claims out of business through excessive taxation. Swann started a miner's revolt, claiming independence from the Kel-Morian Combine. However, Combine forces arrived and mercilessly crushed the revolt. Swann himself lost an arm, along with many friends, and was only saved because Raynor's Raiders responded to their distress signal. Swann had nothing left, so he joined the Raiders.

==== Egon Stetmann ====
- Voiced by Scott Menville

Egon Stetmann is a former scientist from the Terran Dominion's science project in Tyrador III that involved a cyborg program using New Folsom Prison inmates as experimental lab rats. He tried to protest the experiments, but his former colleagues silenced him. He uses a virus to escape the facility, then goes into hiding at Deadman's Port. Raynor rescued him from attackers, and he became the Hyperion's engineer/scientist and researcher. After the events of Wings of Liberty, Stetmann was left to set up a research outpost on the planet Bel'Shir, where he went insane due to exposure to terrazine, believing that the planet itself spoke to him. Stetmann's first name and appearance is a nod to Egon Spengler, a character from the Ghostbusters franchise.

==== Tychus Findlay ====
- Voiced by Neil Kaplan

Tychus J. Findlay is a marine and past associate of Raynor's who becomes affiliated with the Raiders. He appears in the novel Heaven's Devil and in Wings of Liberty as one of the main characters. Findlay is known for his charisma and toughness, and by his friendship with James Raynor. Findlay is introduced in the cinematic trailer for StarCraft II, in which he is shown being encased into powered combat armour. Once he is fully suited up, Mengsk addresses him by name, saying that he is ready for action. "Hell, it's about time," Findlay responds. Findlay is surrounded by rumours regarding his reputation; on the one hand, he is held as a loyal soldier who risks his life to save his comrades, while on the other, he is regarded as an amoral scoundrel. Findlay and Raynor fought together for the Confederacy several years prior to the events of StarCraft before becoming outlaws; Findlay was eventually captured and incarcerated. By Wings of Liberty, Findlay escapes from prison, tracks down Raynor, and recruits him to work for the secretive Moebius Foundation, where, according to Metzen, Findlay acts as the metaphorical devil on Raynor's shoulder.

After the events of the Campaign, it is revealed that Tychus was only released from his prison by Arcturus Mengsk under the condition that he had to assassinate Sarah Kerrigan. If she dies, Tychus would go free; otherwise, his combat armor would kill him. After Kerrigan is de-infested by the Xel'naga artifact's energy pulse and freed from Amon's control, when Tychus revealed this to Raynor, Raynor blocked Tychus' shot intended for Kerrigan and shot his friend dead.

Tychus also appears as a playable character in Heroes of the Storm.

==== Milo Kachinsky ====
- Voiced by Jason Marsden

Milo Kachinsky is a Terran engineer and member of Raynor's Raiders who serves aboard the battlecruiser Hyperion during the events of Wings of Liberty. Initially appearing as one of the background crew members aboard the ship, Kachinsky works under chief engineer Rory Swann and assists with the Raiders' technological operations.

Originally from the Kel-Morian Combine, Kachinsky was a gifted engineer who abandoned his family's connections after the Dominion's actions against the Combine. Seeking to oppose Arcturus Mengsk, he joined Raynor's rebel movement and became part of the Hyperion's engineering staff. Although Swann initially distrusted him because of his Kel-Morian background, Kachinsky eventually earned his respect and was placed in charge of the ship's robotics research.

During Wings of Liberty, Kachinsky is among the Raiders who question Raynor's decision to ally with Valerian Mengsk and the Dominion in an attempt to de-infest Sarah Kerrigan. His objections contribute to the conflict among the crew aboard the Hyperion, before he ultimately accepts Raynor's reasoning and continues supporting the Raiders' mission.

Early versions of Wings of Liberty included a planned storyline involving a crew mutiny aboard the Hyperion, with Kachinsky among the characters connected to the plot. The storyline was removed before release, though his distrust of Raynor's alliance with Valerian retained elements of the earlier conflict.

==== Gabriel Tosh ====
- Voiced by Dave Fennoy

Gabriel Tosh is a mysterious arms dealer and a "spectre"—an elite ghost agent enhanced through the use of terrazine, a potent psionic reagent. Though originally created for Ghost, Tosh is introduced in the novel Spectres and Wings of Liberty. Metzen describes Tosh as a "Boba Fett-type character" while Andy Chambers feels Tosh is "quasi-Rastafarian". Tosh possesses a nihilistic personality and believes that he must always look out for himself in order to survive. As such, he acts as a foil for the idealistic and honorable character of Matt Horner. Tosh represents an amoral influence on Raynor, and the temptation to cut corners and act like a pirate.

The player can choose to help him break his former friends out of New Folsom Prison, or ally with Nova to end the project.

==== Ariel Hanson ====
- Voiced by Ali Hillis

Dr. Ariel Hanson is a scientist who becomes associated with Raynor's Raiders after her home colony on the planet Agria is invaded by Zerg in Wings of Liberty. A selfless and altruistic individual, she mainly wishes for life to return to normal. She is considered to be the moral opposite of Tychus Findlay, acting as a metaphorical angel on Raynor's shoulder, and represents a positive moral influence on Raynor. Originally designed as a male character, Hanson was changed in development to female to act as a love interest for Raynor, albeit limited by Raynor's status as a mercenary and fugitive, and moreover the fact that Raynor is still trying to sort himself out in relation to Sarah Kerrigan. In the course of the campaign the player discovers that the Zerg infestation had spread to Agria, and the Protoss had dispatched a fleet to purify the planet as a result. The player can help her colony by eliminating the Protoss mothership, which ends in her staying behind and continuing research for a cure to Zerg infestation. Alternatively, if the player chooses to purify the colony themselves, she will end up infested while desperately researching a cure, forcing Raynor to kill her.

=== Terran Dominion ===
The Terran Dominion is a human interstellar empire founded by Emperor Arcturus Mengsk I following the collapse of the Terran Confederacy during the Great War. Mengsk transformed his revolutionary group The Sons of Korhal into the dominant Terran political power in the Koprulu Sector, though his regime retained many authoritarian practices of the Confederacy it replaced. The Dominion serves as a major Terran faction throughout the StarCraft series, alternating between antagonist and ally of the point-of-view character of each campaign depending on the circumstances. Its principal figures include Arcturus Mengsk, his son and eventual successor Valerian Mengsk, and Dominion military leaders such as Edmund Duke, Horace Warfield, and Carolina Davis. During the Second Great War, the Dominion is challenged by Jim Raynor, who oppose Mengsk's rule, although Valerian later forms an alliance with Raynor in an effort to address the Zerg threat.

==== Arcturus Mengsk ====
- Voiced by James Harper

Arcturus Mengsk was the emperor of the Terran Dominion, which presided over the majority of the Terrans in the Koprulu Sector. The main antagonist of the series, he is voiced by James Harper and is the primary subject of the novel I, Mengsk. Mengsk is extremely intelligent and is capable as both a strategist and tactician. While Mengsk does not empathize with people well, he is highly skilled at oratory and propaganda and possesses a remarkable ability for manipulating other people.

Born on Korhal IV, the scion of a powerful founding family of the Terran Confederacy, Mengsk was a colonel in the Confederate Marine Corps and a veteran of the Guild Wars, who became a successful prospector after war's end. Though trying to distance himself from the actions of his father, a prominent Korhal senator and vocal dissident against the Confederacy, Mengsk became a revolutionary himself when his father, mother, and younger sister were murdered by Confederate assassins. His activities soon spurred the Confederacy to launch a nuclear attack against Korhal, wiping out its population; Mengsk swore vengeance, and formed a revolutionary group he called the Sons of Korhal. Years of open conflict successfully weakened Confederate control over the fringe worlds, during which he recruited followers such as Sarah Kerrigan, Jim Raynor, and Edmund Duke. Raynor and Kerrigan grew uneasy with Mengsk's increasingly extreme methods, namely luring Zerg to attack Confederate targets, leading to Mengsk abandoning Kerrigan to the Zerg on the Confederate capital of Tarsonis (another reason for the latter was Kerrigan had been the assassin who murdered his father). With the destruction of Tarsonis by the Zerg, Mengsk crowned himself emperor and styled himself as a benevolent dictator.

In Brood War, the Dominion is invaded by the United Earth Directorate, and Mengsk narrowly escapes capture with the reluctant help of Raynor. Faced with execution and the destruction of the Dominion as alternatives, Mengsk allies with Kerrigan and Raynor to defeat the UED, but Kerrigan eventually betrays their alliance and delivers a crippling blow to Mengsk's forces. Nevertheless, Mengsk rebuilds, and the Dominion remains the dominant Terran power. In Frontline, many of the stories in the anthology paint Mengsk and the Dominion overall as tyrannical and corrupt, no different from the Confederacy.

In Wings of Liberty, Mengsk and his son Valerian find the Dominion opposed by several rebel and paramilitary groups, including Raynor's Raiders. Mengsk suffers compound setbacks during the game, initially due to the mass invasion of Dominion space by Zerg forces, which catches the Dominion military and Mengsk unprepared, and later from Raynor's Raiders who capture and broadcast proof of Mengsk's war crimes during the events of StarCraft. Despite these setbacks, Arcturus manages to overcome these hardships, maintaining his position as Emperor of the Dominion for the remainder of the game. It is eventually revealed that Mengsk was responsible for the release from prison of Tychus Findlay, with the specific purpose of tailing Jim Raynor and killing Kerrigan; Raynor foils this plan by killing Tychus.

During the events of Heart of the Swarm, Mengsk tries to have Kerrigan killed on several occasions, including issuing an obituary about Raynor. Kerrigan however, successfully reunites the Zerg Swarm and storms the Dominion capital of Augustgrad on the planet Korhal with help from Raynor's Raiders. After the final showdown inside Mengsk's palace, Kerrigan manages to gain the upper hand with help from James Raynor, and kills Mengsk by overloading his body with psychic energy, causing him to explode. In the wake of his death, Valerian ascends to the throne.

GameSpy cites Mengsk as a classic example of The Who's "Won't Get Fooled Again" lyrics "meet the new boss, same as the old boss".

==== Edmund Duke ====
- Voiced by: Jack Ritschel, Doug Stone (StarCraft II)

Edmund Duke is ranking officer in first the Confederacy and later the Dominion. Duke also appears in several novels, including Liberty's Crusade, Shadow of the Xel'Naga, and Queen of Blades. A scion of one of the influential Old Families of Confederacy with a long career in the military, Duke is a methodical and experienced tactician, but also as an egotistical and xenophobic man. As a colonel, Duke commands the Alpha Squadron of the Confederate Security Forces, and he is the face of the Confederacy for the player in the early parts of StarCraft. Duke initially leads the defense of Confederate colonies Chau Sara and Mar Sara from the Zerg and the Protoss fleet commanded by Tassadar, for which he is promoted to general.

Duke is later charged with quelling rebellion on the Confederate world of Antiga Prime, but is defeated by Mengsk's forces. When Duke's flagship Norad II is shot down by the Zerg during the battle, Duke is rescued by Raynor on Mengsk's orders in return for the defection of the general and his squadron, and Duke's knowledge is vital to Mengsk's assault on Tarsonis. Mengsk, still skeptical of Duke's loyalty, later dispatches Duke on expeditions to investigate the Zerg on Char and a Xel'Naga artifact on Bhekar Ro in Shadow of the Xel'Naga, engagements that decimate Alpha Squadron. In Brood War, Duke organizes the Dominion's fleet defenses against the United Earth Directorate, and later follows Mengsk into alliance with Kerrigan and her Zerg. However, as part of a surgical strike against the Dominion's military capabilities, Kerrigan has Duke's flagship destroyed, killing the general.

==== Valerian Mengsk ====
- Voiced by Josh Keaton

Valerian Mengsk is the son of Arcturus Mengsk and his successor as Emperor of the Terran Dominion. Valerian is first introduced in The Dark Templar Saga series of novels, while his backstory is further developed in I, Mengsk. Valerian was created as Metzen felt that Arcturus' story had been effectively told in StarCraft and Brood War. While Blizzard stipulated Valerian's physical description, The Dark Templar Saga author Christie Golden was given the freedom to develop the character as she wished. A disciple of Japanese martial arts and a keen archaeologist, he is described as "brilliant... and probably a bit arrogant for knowing it". Valerian is particularly interested in Xel'Naga artifacts, which he employs mercenaries and leading archaeologists to retrieve and study. Valerian was raised in secrecy on a number of worlds across the Koprulu Sector during his father's campaign against the Confederacy. While Valerian shares Arcturus' passion for liquors and ancient weapons, his relationship with his father is adversarial due to Arcturus' disdain for both him and his mother in his childhood.

Valerian made his game debut in Wings of Liberty. He is confronted by Jim Raynor, mistaking him for his father Arcturus, aboard the Dominion battlecruiser Bucephalus. Valerian reveals that he is the owner of the Moebius Foundation, the think tank that Raynor had been collecting the pieces of a Xel'Naga artifact for, and claimed that his mission was the same as Raynor's – to rescue Kerrigan. Taking more than half the Dominion fleet, Valerian joins forces with Raynor's Raiders and lays siege to the Zerg stronghold of Char, as part of an effort to prove to the Dominion (and to his father) that he will be worthy to take the emperor's crown after Arcturus. Ultimately, the mission succeeds in de-infesting Kerrigan, but in the aftermath of the battle a disagreement between Arcturus and Valerian over Kerrigan's fate sparks an armed civil war between the Emperor and Prince, leading Valerian and a faction of the Dominion's armed forces loyal to him to seek shelter with Raynor's Raiders.

In Heart of the Swarm, Valerian helps Raynor and his Raiders escape into the Umojan Protectorate, where Kerrigan undergoes extensive testing in a research lab. The lab is discovered and attacked by a Dominion task force, and Valerian and Kerrigan escape on board the Hyperion, the Raiders' flagship. Valerian is nearly psionically strangled by Kerrigan for leaving Raynor behind on the base. Valerian knew that his father would be willing to sacrifice him to destroy Kerrigan, even in spite of Hyperion captain Matt Horner warning the Dominion fleet that he was on board, and so he aided Kerrigan and the Raiders in searching for him. During the final assault against Korhal, Valerian recognized that Arcturus was beyond redemption, and asked only that Kerrigan minimize civilian casualties; Kerrigan thus elected to attend his request, recognizing him as a different man from his father. Kerrigan killed Arcturus shortly thereafter. Following the death of his father and the departure of the Zerg, Valerian assumed the throne and became the new Emperor of the Dominion. He immediately went to work rebuilding the Dominion, and enacted new laws to eliminate the corruption and abuse of power that had occurred during his father's reign. These reforms included abolishing forced military conscription and slave labor. He also reorganized a number of his father's secret projects, such as Project Blackstone.

In Legacy of the Void, not long after his ascension to the throne, Korhal and the rest of the Dominion are assaulted by Moebius Foundation under control of the fallen Xel'Naga, Amon. Alongside Raynor, he does everything in his power to save his people. When Artanis arrives, he aids Raynor and Valerian to repel the Moebius Foundation on Korhal. After Amon has been banished into the Void, Valerian allows Raynor to take the Dominion Fleet to Ulnar in order to help Kerrigan and Artanis to defeat Amon once for all. After Amon's defeat, Valerian has turned the Terran Dominion into a government of peace and prosperity.

In Nova Covert Ops, Valerian has been under pressure from the Defenders of Man, who oppose his rule. Valerian questions Nova when she returned to the Dominion after being missing for some time. Valerian believes her claim, that she didn't betray the Dominion and grants her her own covert ops team to discover what the Defenders of Man are up to. After Nova learns that the Defenders are using psi emitters to lure zerg to Dominion Worlds to discredit him, and learning the identity of their leader, General Davis, Valerian contacts Davis and announces his wish to step down as the Emperor of the Dominion.

==== Horace Warfield ====
- Voiced by Gary Anthony Williams

General Horace Warfield is put in command of the Dominion forces to fight the second Zerg invasion, in Wings of Liberty. He served in the Confederate military under Arcturus Mengsk and held a higher place among Mengsk's advisors than Edmund Duke, who also abandoned the confederacy. His entire family was killed during the Zerg assault on Tarsonis due to the use of the psi-emitters, about which Warfield is rumoured to have provided extremely valuable intelligence. In Heart of the Swarm, Warfield is defeated by Kerrigan and tells her to let the transports full of wounded troops leave the planet alive, calling her a traitor to humanity and stating that Raynor would be ashamed of her. Kerrigan, furious at the general's comments, executes him but allows the transports to escape.

==== Carolina Davis ====
General Carolina Davis is a Terran Dominion officer who appears in StarCraft II: Nova Covert Ops as its primary antagonist. She serves as the commander of the Dominion military unit known as the Defenders of Man, a human supremacist organisation that opposes any peaceful cooperation with alien species. A loyalist of Valerian's father and predecessor Arcturus Mengsk, she later leads a rebellion against the Dominion government while claiming to act in defence of humanity. Her actions force Nova Terra to investigate the Defenders of Man and ultimately confront Davis's faction.

==== Reigel ====
Reigel is a Terran Dominion weapons and technology specialist who assists Nova Terra during StarCraft II: Nova Covert Ops. Formerly associated with the Moebius Foundation, he is assigned to Nova by Emperor Valerian Mengsk. His role is primarily supportive, providing briefings and assisting Nova's investigations into the Defenders of Man, providing information and operational support as she attempts to uncover the organisation's activities and navigates the political tensions within Valerian Mengsk's government.

==== Stone ====
Stone (codename Agent X74996R) is a Terran Ghost operative who appears in StarCraft II: Nova Covert Ops. A former member of the Terran Dominion's Ghost Program, Stone trained alongside Nova and became one of her closest associates before the events of the campaign. Like other Ghosts, his memories were altered as part of the program, leaving his personal history fragmented.

Prior to the events of Nova Covert Ops, Stone and Nova investigate the Defenders of Man and discover that the organisation has been using psi-emitters in its operations. After being captured, Stone's memories are manipulated by the Defenders of Man, causing him to believe that Nova betrayed him. Nova later defeats him in combat and helps him recover from the conditioning imposed on him.

Stone also appears as a playable commander in StarCraft II: Co-op Missions, where he leads a Ghost-based force alongside Nova.

=== United Earth Directorate ===
The United Earth Directorate (UED) is a Terran government from Earth that launches an expedition to the Koprulu sector during the events of StarCraft: Brood War. Seeking to bring the distant human colonies under its authority, the UED Expeditionary Fleet is led by Admiral Gerard DuGalle and his second-in-command Vice Admiral Alexei Stukov. DuGalle and Stukov represents the faction's contrasting approaches: DuGalle's commitment to Earth’s mission and Stukov's more pragmatic understanding of the Koprulu sector.

The expedition initially succeeds in capturing control of the Terran Dominion through Samir Duran, who holds himself out as a loyalist of the Terran Confederate holding out against the Dominion, while secretly pursuing his own agenda. The UED's campaign ultimately collapses after suffering a series of cumulative military defeats; no UED ship ultimately made its way back to Earth after its entire fleet is singled out for annihilation by Sarah Kerrigan and her Zerg forces.

==== Gerard DuGalle ====
- Voiced by Jack Ritschel

Gerard DuGalle is the commanding admiral of the United Earth Directorate's expeditionary force to the Koprulu Sector. Considered the UED's most capable military leader, DuGalle, a Frenchman, is a staunch believer in the UED's mission to pacify the sector and carries out his orders with precision. In Brood War, DuGalle leads the UED as it conquers the Terran Dominion; however, despite his experience, DuGalle believes misinformation planted by former Confederate soldier Samir Duran regarding a psi disruptor, a device that disrupts Zerg communications, on Tarsonis. When DuGalle's lifelong friend Alexei Stukov abandons the fleet, DuGalle allows Duran to assassinate Stukov as a traitor, only realizing his mistake too late. Nevertheless, DuGalle acts to prevent Duran from destroying the psi disruptor and uses it to capture the Zerg Overmind on Char. However, as a result of demoralization, limited manpower, and an alliance of enemies led by Kerrigan, the fleet is eventually pushed back, and when a final attempt to recapture Char fails, DuGalle orders the retreat. Shortly before the UED fleet is overtaken by Zerg and destroyed, DuGalle composes a letter to his wife in which he admits responsibility for his closest friend's death and commits suicide by a gunshot to the head.

==== Alexei Stukov ====
- Voiced by Paul Ainsley in StarCraft: Brood War; Victor Brandt in Heart of the Swarm, Legacy of the Void and Heroes of the Storm.

Alexei Stukov is the vice admiral and second-in-command of the United Earth Directorate's expeditionary force. He later reappears as one of Kerrigan's lieutenants in the Zerg Swarm in Heart of the Swarm and Legacy of the Void, voiced by Victor Brandt. A man of Russian descent, his military career primarily revolves around secret research, though he is also noted as an excellent tactician. A close friend of DuGalle, Stukov will debate situations with the admiral, but will subordinate himself to his friend's higher rank. Stukov becomes suspicious of the motives of Samir Duran after the latter convinces DuGalle to destroy the psi disruptor. Believing the device to be the UED's best hope to conquer the Zerg, Stukov instead takes the psi disruptor to Braxis, but is tracked down and shot dead by Duran. With his dying breaths, Stukov convinces DuGalle that Duran is a traitor and to keep the psi disruptor running for the UED's assault on the Zerg homeworld of Char. Stukov's body is given a full funeral, and UED propaganda portrays Stukov as a hero, claiming he died in combat on Char.

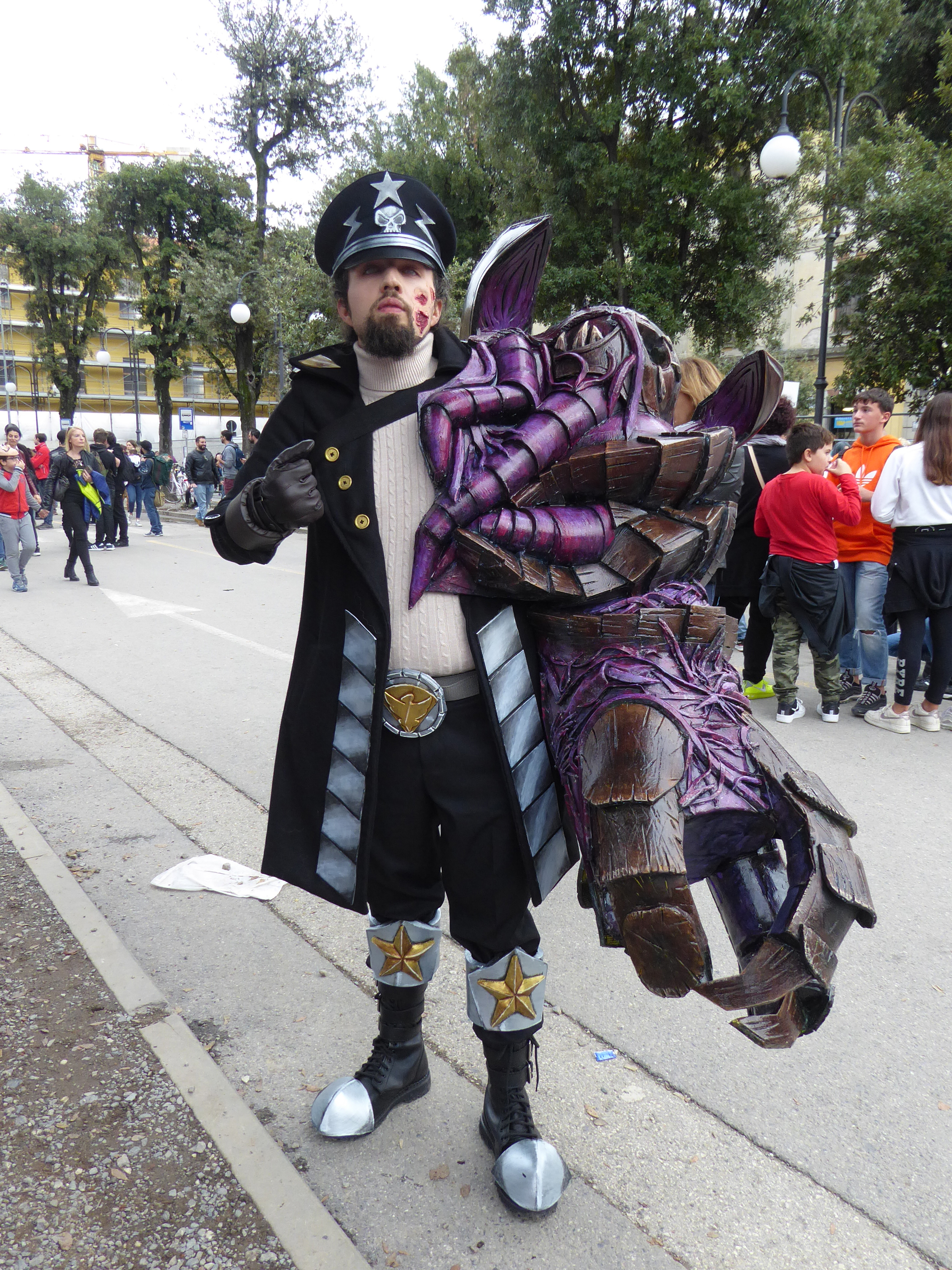
Cosplayer portraying Infested Stukov.

Stukov is later mysteriously revived by a Zerg cerebrate to make use of him for its own deeds. He is first observed, apparently infested, by pirates raiding a secret science facility in the bonus mission "Deception", a facility that Stukov subsequently destroys. Stukov later appears in another bonus map, "Mercenaries II", in which he hires several mercenary groups to destroy some of his adversaries. In the StarCraft 64 secret mission "Resurrection", Artanis sends a task force headed by Raynor to inject Stukov with an experimental serum; the serum reverses the infestation effects and leaves Stukov healthy, albeit embittered. However, the Protoss cure would prove only temporary, and once Stukov was turned over to the Moebious Foundation for research purposes, the scientists re-infested him in an attempt to replicate the cure, without success. Creative director Andy Chambers regards the resurrection as an experiment by the Zerg, while Metzen notes that Stukov's resurrection had "really interesting hooks". Blizzard's former producer Bill Roper hoped that Stukov's storyline will be developed further, noting that the character would only be reintroduced if Blizzard can "figure out the right way to do it".

An infested incarnation of Alexei Stukov makes a canon appearance in StarCraft II: Heart of the Swarm. Following Sarah Kerrigan's transformation on Zerus, Stukov contacts her and tells her about infestation experiments being performed on Skygeirr Platform. According to Stukov, he escaped his Moebius captors after being re-infested and learned that the foundation is secretly breeding Protoss-Zerg hybrids at the request of Arcturus Mengsk. Although not a hybrid himself, Stukov oddly seems to possess an amalgamation of Protoss and Zerg abilities and characteristics, though this likely resulted from his exposure to the Protoss anti-infestation cure. Once the lab breeding the hybrid is destroyed, he realizes that he has no purpose and cannot return to Earth or any Terran faction as an infested human. Kerrigan offers him a position in the Swarm as a leader, and Stukov ultimately decides to remain with the Swarm.

In the epilogue of Legacy of the Void, Stukov joins in the battle against a resurrected Duran, revealed to be a Xel'Naga. Stukov successfully delivers the killing blow to Duran.

Stukov also appears as a playable character in Heroes of the Storm.

=== Other ===
==== Adjutant ====
Adjutants are artificial intelligence assistants used by Terran military organisations throughout the StarCraft series. Confederate, Dominion and UED forces alike rely on adjutants to provide tactical information, mission briefings, and operational support. Unlike individual named characters, adjutants function primarily as a recurring representation of Terran military technology and command infrastructure.

During the events of the Terran campaign of the 1998 video game StarCraft, an adjutant assists Jim Raynor while he serves as a marshal of the Confederate colony of Mar Sara before later becoming associated with Arcturus Mengsk's Sons of Korhal. Adjutants continue to appear in later entries, including StarCraft II: Wings of Liberty, where Dominion artificial intelligence systems provide mission information and manage military operations. An adjutant also accompanies Nova Terra during StarCraft II: Nova Covert Ops, assisting her during her missions conducted for Emperor Valerian Mengsk.

==== Michael Liberty ====
- Voiced by Blair Bess.

Michael Liberty is a Terran journalist introduced in the novel StarCraft: Liberty's Crusade (1999), written by Jeff Grubb. The novel retells the events of the original StarCraft campaign from Liberty's perspective as he documents the collapse of the Terran Confederacy, the rise of Arcturus Mengsk and the Sons of Korhal, and the emergence of the Zerg and Protoss conflicts in the Koprulu sector.

Liberty begins the story as a reporter covering the Confederacy before becoming involved with Jim Raynor and Mengsk's rebellion. His role differs from the military figures central to the game series, as he primarily observes and records the events surrounding the conflict rather than serving as a combatant. He later appears in StarCraft: Frontline, a comic anthology published by Tokyopop that expands stories set within the StarCraft universe.

==== Kate Lockwell ====
Kate Lockwell is a Terran journalist and field reporter for the United News Network (UNN). In Wings of Liberty, Lockwell provides news reports covering major events in the Koprulu sector, including the activities of Raynor's Raiders, the Terran Dominion's response to the Zerg resurgence, and the political developments surrounding Emperor Arcturus Mengsk. Her reports are presented as in-universe UNN broadcasts that provide a civilian media perspective on events occurring during the campaign. Lockwell later also appears in Heart of the Swarm and Legacy of the Void, continuing to provide UNN coverage of major conflicts affecting the sector.

==== Donny Vermillion ====
Donny Vermillion is a Terran news anchor for the UNN who appears in Wings of Liberty. Vermillion presents studio-based broadcasts that report on events from the perspective of the Terran Dominion. His segments frequently portray Jim Raynor and his Raiders as criminals and emphasise Dominion military achievements during the conflict. Vermillion's broadcasts continue to appear during Heart of the Swarm, where UNN coverage provides additional commentary on the aftermath of the events of Wings of Liberty and the continuing conflicts in the Koprulu sector.

==== Graven Hill ====
Graven Hill is a Terran mercenary coordinator who appears in StarCraft II: Wings of Liberty. Operating aboard the battlecruiser Hyperion, Hill serves as a contact for Jim Raynor's Raiders by arranging access to mercenary forces that supplement the Raiders' military capabilities. A former associate of organisations including Hammer Securities and the Umojan Protectorate, Hill represents the independent mercenary networks operating outside the formal structures of the Terran Dominion.

Hill later appears in StarCraft II: Co-op Missions as a character associated with Terran mercenary operations.

==== Orlan ====
Colonel Orlan is a Terran mercenary and computer programmer who is known for his expertise in decrypting Confederate and Dominion computer systems. In Wings of Liberty, Raynor's Raiders hire Orlan during the mission "Cutthroat" to decrypt Adjutant 23-46, a recovered Confederate/Dominion data core containing evidence concerning Arcturus Mengsk's actions during the Great War. After successfully decrypting the data, Orlan attempts to sell the information to the Dominion instead of giving it to Raynor, hiring Mira Han's mercenaries to protect himself. Raynor defeats Orlan's forces but opted to have him detained with Han rather than kill him, as he is deemed to be a useful source of information.

After Jim Raynor is captured by Arcturus Mengsk's forces in Heart of the Swarm, Matt Horner and Valerian Mengsk require Orlan's expertise to infiltrate the Dominion's deep-encryption network and locate Raynor. Since Orlan is being held by Han, the Hyperion attacks Han's mercenary base to secure his release. Orlan initially refuses to cooperate but agrees after Valerian threatens to return him to Han. He subsequently hacks the Dominion network and discovers Raynor's location aboard the prison ship Moros.

==== Mira Han ====
Mira Han is a Terran mercenary leader and the commander of Mira's Marauders. She is introduced during the Wings of Liberty mission "Cutthroat", where Jim Raynor's Raiders compete with Colonel Orlan for the services of her mercenary forces. Han ultimately sides with Raynor after he secures her contract, helping the Raiders recover the stolen Adjutant 23-46 from Orlan.

Han has a longstanding personal connection with Matt Horner, whom she claims as her "husband" after winning him as the prize in a poker game, although Horner is reluctant to acknowledge the arrangement. Her unpredictable personality and reputation as a dangerous mercenary frequently place her at odds with the more disciplined Horner.

During Heart of the Swarm, Han plays a central role in the mission "With Friends Like These...". After Jim Raynor is captured by the Dominion, Horner and Valerian Mengsk seek Orlan's assistance in decrypting the Dominion's security network to locate him. Because Orlan is being held by Han and she refuses to release him to anyone other than Raynor, the Hyperion attacks her mercenary operations, forcing her to surrender Orlan.

Han later returns as a commander in StarCraft II: Co-op Missions alongside Matt Horner, where the pair's contrasting personalities and military approaches are represented through their combined mercenary and Dominion forces.

== Protoss characters ==
Prior to the events of the StarCraft video games, Protoss society was divided among the Protoss Empire of Aiur who follow the Khala, the exiled Nerazim or Dark Templar, the brutal Tal'darim, and the Purifiers, artificial warriors created at the height of the Protoss' technological development. The collapse of the old Protoss political order during the timeline of the video game series forced the surviving factions to cooperate for mutual survival. The Daelaam subsequently emerged as a unified Protoss alliance, incorporating the traditions, technologies, and peoples of the various Protoss factions.

=== Aiur Protoss ===
The Protoss of Aiur are the traditional Protoss civilization that originated on the planet Aiur. Their culture and society are shaped by the Khala, a communal psychic philosophy developed after the Aeon of Strife that allow Protoss individuals to share thoughts and emotions through a collective connection. The Protoss who embraced the Khala became the dominant culture and political order of the Protoss Empire. Under the Khala, the Protoss of Aiur abandoned its original tribal divisions and was reorganised into three castes: the Khalai Caste, composed of artisans, scientists, engineers, and other workers; the Templar Caste, responsible for military defence and exploration; and the Judicator Caste, which governed through a theocratic governance structure known as the Conclave.

During the Great War, Aiur was invaded by the Zerg and the Protoss are forced to abandon their homeworld. The destruction of their civilization led the refugees from Aiur to reconsider the divisions that had separated them from the exiled Nerazim and other Protoss groups. During the End War, the Protoss of Aiur faced the complete collapse of the traditions that had defined their civilization. When Amon returned, he exploited the psychic connection of the Khala to control the Protoss who remained linked to it, turning their greatest source of unity into a vulnerability. To escape Amon's influence, Artanis and the surviving Protoss who followed the Khala had their nerve cords severed, permanently ending the psychic bond that had defined their society for thousands of years. The loss of the Khala forced the Protoss survivors to confront questions of identity and purpose, while Artanis formally ends the caste system and establishes the Daelaam, a new Protoss society composed of disparate Protoss factions that sought to preserve their heritage while overcoming the conflicts of the past.

==== Tassadar ====
- Voiced by: Michael Gough in StarCraft, Michael Dorn in StarCraft II: Wings of Liberty

Tassadar is a high templar who holds the rank of executor in the Khalai military. He appears in StarCraft and in several novels, most notably Queen of Blades. Tassadar is voiced by Michael Gough in StarCraft, with Michael Dorn playing the part in later appearances. Described as being fascinated with, if somewhat wary of, the dark templar, Tassadar is the commander of the fleet that made first contact with the Terrans by destroying their colony of Chau Sara to contain Zerg infestation. However, Tassadar eventually disregards his orders to continue destroying worlds with no concern for the Terrans, and instead engages the Zerg by conventional means. After tracking the Zerg to their homeworld of Char, he encounters the dark templar Zeratul and Jim Raynor, forging a friendship with the two and learning how to use his psionic powers in conjunction with the powers of the dark templar.

The Khalai government sees Tassadar's consortion with the dark templar as heretical and as a bigger threat to their society than the Zerg invasion of the Protoss homeworld Aiur, sending Aldaris and Artanis to arrest him. Artanis however, along with Fenix, sides with Tassadar, sparking a civil war between Tassadar's followers and the government. The conflict is only ended when Tassadar demonstrates the effectiveness of the dark templar against the Zerg. With Raynor, Zeratul and Fenix, Tassadar breaks through the Zerg defences on Aiur to the Zerg Overmind; Tassadar channels both his own psionic energies and those of the dark templar through the hull of his flagship and crashes it into the Overmind. The resulting discharge of energy destroys the Overmind and transcends Tassadar to a new level of spiritual existence; Metzen refers to this transformation as becoming a "twilight messiah".

By the events of StarCraft II: Wings of Liberty, Tassadar is believed dead by the Protoss, though he has become a legendary figure among them. However, when Zeratul visits the remains of the Overmind in his investigations into the Koprulu Sector's future, Tassadar appears in spirit form and shows him a vision that the Overmind had originally shown him when he destroyed it. This vision foretold the fall of the galaxy to the Zerg Swarm led by the Xel'naga Amon and his Protoss-Zerg hybrids. This Tassadar turns out to be a projection of the Xel'Naga Ouros and not the real Tassadar.

Tassadar also appears as a playable character in Heroes of the Storm.

==== Aldaris ====
- Voiced by: Paul Eiding

Aldaris is a member of the ruling judicator caste of Protoss society; in StarCraft he acts as liaison between the player character and the Protoss government. Aldaris is a fanatical believer in the Khala and does not hesitate to judge others through a strict interpretation of its tenets. As a result, he is outraged by Tassadar's association with the dark templar, and following the outbreak of war between the judicator caste and the templar caste, commands the government forces against Tassadar. Aldaris captures Tassadar and puts him on trial for crimes of blasphemy and treason, though Tassadar is freed by Fenix, Raynor, and Zeratul. Aldaris later witnesses the rebels successfully penetrate the Zerg's core defenses, and wishes them luck in their final battle against the Overmind. In Brood War, Aldaris reluctantly allies with the dark templar when the Protoss flee Aiur for Shakuras. However, when Sarah Kerrigan is accepted as an ally by dark templar matriarch Raszagal, Aldaris is furious. While Artanis and Zeratul are absent, he discovers Raszagal is being mentally controlled by Kerrigan and instigates a rebellion amongst the Khalai refugees. When his insurrection is thwarted, the judicator tries to explain his actions to Artanis and Zeratul, but is murdered by Kerrigan before he can reveal her involvement.

==== Fenix ====
- Voiced by Bill Roper in StarCraft and StarCraft: Brood War

A templar and an old friend of Tassadar's, Fenix is a powerful and cunning leader, but remains distrustful towards the motives of the ruling judicator caste. Under the command of Aldaris, Fenix helps defend Aiur from the Zerg invasion, but eventually falls in the battle of Antioch when his position is overwhelmed by Zerg and his psi-blades lose power. Nevertheless, Fenix is retrieved and integrated into a dragoon, a mechanical fire support unit designed to allow incapacitated warriors to continue military service. Fenix allies his templar forces with Tassadar's upon the schism between Tassadar and the Protoss government, later leading a task force against the Overmind's outer defenses, facilitating Zeratul's assassination of a number of cerebrates and ultimately the death of the Overmind itself. Over this time, Fenix develops a strong friendship with Tassadar's Terran companion Jim Raynor.

In Brood War, Fenix and Raynor remain behind as a rear guard when the Protoss evacuate the now Zerg-overrun Aiur through a warp gate. They hold it until attacked by United Earth Directorate forces pursuing Arcturus Mengsk, upon which they escape through the gate, disabling it as they depart. With Raynor and Mengsk, Fenix enters into an alliance with Sarah Kerrigan against the UED, even leading the Zerg forces on a raiding mission for resources on Moria. However, after the UED is routed from their position on the Dominion capital world of Korhal, Kerrigan turns on her allies. Though unfazed by Kerrigan's betrayal, Fenix is slain when Kerrigan's Zerg launch a surprise attack against his base camp on Korhal. In StarCraft II: Heart of the Swarm, Raynor shows that he still harbors a grudge against Kerrigan for Fenix's death after seeing her willingly become infested again after all his hard work in returning her to human form.

In Legacy of the Void, it is revealed that before Fenix's defeat at Antioch in StarCraft, his personality was cloned and inserted into an experimental mechanical body of ancient Purifiers. This body was locked inside a stasis vault on planet Glacius. Artanis obtained Fenix and with his help he was able to gain the Purifiers as allies against Amon. During the campaign he concludes that despite having Fenix's memories, he was a different being. Because of this, he changed his name to Talandar.

Fenix also appears as a playable character in Heroes of the Storm.

==== Selendis ====
- Voiced by Cree Summer

Selendis is the executor of the Protoss military following the reunification of the race. The character is introduced in the novel Twilight and in the Wings of Liberty campaign. Selendis is fiercely loyal to her race's ideals and completely dedicated to her responsibilities. A protégée of Artanis, she considers the Nerazim to be a threat to her heritage, but she is willing to work beside them. Selendis is particularly eager to reclaim Aiur from the Zerg.

In Wings of Liberty, Selendis leads a force to the planet Haven, where refugees of Meinhoff and Agria have settled after the fall of their old homeworlds, to purge it with fire in order to eradicate a Zerg virus that has infested several refugees. Raynor's Raiders appear and are formally greeted by Selendis as past allies. The player could choose to purge Haven in the Protoss' place while trying to save as many uninfested refugees as possible, or have Raynor side with Ariel Hanson of Agria, who has ideals of being able to create a cure for the Zerg Infestation. In Zeratul's apocalyptic vision, Selendis appears as one of the Protoss heroes who makes their last stand against Zerg and Hybrid forces.

In Legacy of the Void, she serves as the Executor in the invasion of Aiur but falls under Amon's control, like many other Protoss. She leads the golden armada against Artanis's forces, who holds them out long enough for the Keystone to break them free from Amon's control. Under Artanis's urging, Selendis severs her nerve cord and urges her fellow templar to sever their cords as well, permanently freeing them from Amon's grasp.

==== Lasarra ====
- Voiced by Courtenay Taylor

Lasarra was a female Protoss scientist stationed on Kaldir when it was attacked by Sarah Kerrigan, and was captured during the attack on Kaldir at the request of Abathur, who wanted to experiment on her even though it was known that the Protoss could not be infested.. During her time onboard Kerrigan's leviathan, Lasarra interacted with Kerrigan a number of times. Kerrigan tried to justify her actions on Kaldir as self-preservation, but Lasarra is unconvinced and tells her that it is no justification for the killing of innocents. Eventually, as one of the Protoss ships was able to break through the Zerg blockade, Lasarra was implanted with a special larva and allowed to warp in to that ship. The larva devoured her and then other lifeforms being stored on the ship, evading detection. It eventually transformed into a broodmother, Niadra, which bred a new brood that infested the ship, killing every Protoss on board. Kerrigan later showed some regret over Lasarra's death, as she told Izsha that she did not enjoy having to kill her.

==== Karax ====
- Voiced by Travis Willingham

Karax is a Khalai phasesmith. An expert in weapons, armor, and ships. Karax is one of the most precise of Protoss engineers. Over the course of the war against Amon, he was able to rise above his worker origins, serving as an important part of the war effort. Karax is shorter and stockier than most Protoss. The armor he wears also differs in that it is more functional than ceremonial. Karax was among the Golden Armada when it assaulted Aiur. After Amon forced the Protoss into retreat, he guided Hierarch Artanis through the Spear of Adun, explaining its systems and how he had given orders for the Templar in stasis to have their nerve cords removed, as per Amon's corruption of the Khala. He had already been forced to sever his own nerve cords, but had attached cybernetic tentacles to the tips, effectively giving him extra means of physical manipulation.

==== Rohana ====
- Voiced by Claudia Christian

Rohana was one of three grand preservers who helped create the arkships. When the Spear of Adun was reactivated, she served as a councilor to Hierarch Artanis.

Before her stasis aboard the Spear of Adun, Rohana was a driven Protoss who was not afraid to seek out tasks others thought impossible. She displayed strict adherence to tradition, yet was creative when faced with the issues. After she was awakened, Rohana held on to the old ways of the Protoss Empire, openly speaking out against her Nerazim crew, Artanis' Terran allies, and the reawakening of the Purifiers. She served as a reminder of the past, clinging to old traditions and ways, and refusing to cut her connection from the Khala even as Amon continued to possess her, stating knowledge and history was the only thing that brought unity to the Protoss. Though Artanis valued her memories and her ability to see into Amon's thoughts, he began to grow weary of her adherence to the old ways and her objections to his choices, becoming more of a critic than a councilor. Eventually, she came to terms with the Daelaam, and cut herself from the Khala, stating that perhaps history did not need to be recorded with perfect clarity.

==== Kaldalis ====
- Voiced by Stephen Stanton

Kaldalis is a Protoss zealot and a member of Hierarch Artanis's forces during the End War] A survivor of the Zerg invasion of Aiur, Kaldalis represents the traditional Khalai Protoss who accepted Artanis's efforts to unite the previously divided Protoss factions under the Daelaam. Although he remains proud of Khalai history and the Khala, he rejects the prejudice that led to the exile of the Nerazim and supports the creation of a unified Protoss society.

=== Nerazim ===
The Nerazim, or the "Dark Templar", were exiled from Aiur for refusing to submit to the communal will of the Khala. They are warriors who strike from the shadows, and remain dedicated defenders of their people despite their banishment. After the devastation of Aiur in StarCraft, the Nerazim took in their Khalai brethren on their shadowy homeworld of Shakuras, where both sides work to rebuild Protoss society.

==== Raszagal ====
- Voiced by Debra De Liso

Raszagal was the matriarch of the Nerazim on Shakuras, and mother to Vorazun. The character appears in Brood War and in the novel Shadow Hunters. Described as one of the oldest living Protoss and imbued with tremendous psychic powers, she is one of the few to clearly remember the Protoss homeworld from before the exile of the Nerazim. During her youth, Raszagal was important in ensuring the dark templar were only exiled, rather than exterminated. In Brood War, Raszagal directs Zeratul and Artanis to cleanse the Zerg from Shakuras and welcomes Sarah Kerrigan as an ally in their mission. This spurs Aldaris to rebellion; Raszagal consequently orders his death. Kerrigan and Samir Duran later kidnap Raszagal from Shakuras, using her to blackmail Zeratul into killing the second Overmind. It quickly becomes apparent that Kerrigan has mentally subverted Raszagal and has been using her to manipulate events from the beginning. Zeratul captures Raszagal, but is unable to hold off the Zerg forces long enough to escape. Realizing that the matriarch is beyond redemption from Kerrigan's influence, Zeratul kills Raszagal. Raszagal's mind is freed by the lethal blow, and she dies thanking Zeratul for releasing her, naming him as her successor as leader of the dark templar.

==== Vorazun ====
- Voiced by Rachel Robinson

Vorazun is the daughter of Raszagal, second-in-command to Artanis, and the leader of the surviving Nerazim on Shakuras. She is a skilled warrior, and dedicated to her people. Vorazun is deeply committed to the individuality and culture of her people. While she originally feared the cultural change the Daelaam was bringing to her people, she nonetheless remained committed to its ideals in a unified Protoss nation.

Vorazun had a complicated relationship with Artanis, even before her ascension to Matriarch. Artanis originally believed she was against his vision on unification. Despite Vorazun's many objections, she nominated Artanis for the role of Hierarch of the Daelaam. By the End War, Vorazun gained a greater deal of respect for Artanis. After the destruction of Shakuras and witnessing him survive against countless foes alone, she claimed Artanis had partaken and completed the "Shadow Walk", becoming Dark Templar. She also comforted Artanis after he killed Zeratul while under Amon's control.

Vorazun had accused Zeratul of treasion against the Nerazim for his role in the death of her mother. Despite Artanis' protests regarding Raszagal's corruption by Kerrigan, she stated she would always hold Zeratul in contempt. It wasn't until following Zeratul's prophecy that lead to Ulnar, she admitted that he was closer to the truth than anyone, and after finally realizing that Zeratul's dedication to the Xel'naga prophecy gave the Protoss hope, she vowed to honor him with Artanis.

==== Ulrezaj ====
Ulrezaj is a Nerazim leader who became one of the most prominent extremists among his people. His actions brought him into conflict with other Protoss leaders, including Zeratul, who opposed Ulrezaj's radical ideology. Ulrezaj is primarily featured in the expanded StarCraft universe, where his character explores the political and philosophical divisions between the Protoss factions that were later reconciled through the formation of the Daelaam. He is first introduced in the downloadable Brood War campaign "Enslavers: Dark Vengeance", and later appears as the antagonist of the novels Shadow Hunters and Twilight. Resenting the exile of the dark templar from Aiur, he abandons his career and takes up arms against the Khalai Protoss as they establish themselves on Shakuras. He later uses the knowledge learned from his early days to become a Dark Archon, an immensely powerful psionic being created from the merging of multiple Dark Templar. Allying with a Terran smuggler, Alan Schezar, Ulrezaj moves an orbital base over Shakuras; Ulrezaj uses Schezar's resources to mutate Zerg to attack the Khalai Protoss, while an EMP device disables Shakuras' power grid. Though defeated by Zeratul's forces, Ulrezaj escapes.

Ulrezaj reappears several years later, residing on Aiur where he is manipulating a faction of Protoss survivors who were not evacuated. Ulrezaj uses these Protoss to attempt to capture a Terran archaeologist, Jacob Ramsey, who has the powerful mind of a Protoss archivist, Zamara, residing in his own mind; their failure to do so leads to Ulrezaj personally trying to take Ramsey, but the archaeologist escapes through a warp gate while both Zerg and Valerian Mengsk's forces also attempt to capture him. Ulrezaj traces Ramsey to Ehlna, breaking through the defenses of both the Protoss and the Dominion. However, Zamara uses the last of her energy to lock Ulrezaj's mind into a storage crystal, sacrificing herself to keep the Dark Archon trapped.

=== Tal'Darim ===
The Tal'Darim, referred to as "the Forged" or "the Chosen" are a fanatical sect of Protoss cut off from the Khala, who actively worship the Xel'Naga as gods. They are one of the antagonists in every game, and serve Amon, to rebuild the universe in his name. However, they become allies with Artanis after Alarak defeats Ma'Lash in the rite of Rak'Shir and becomes leader, vowing to bring down Amon.

==== Alarak ====
- Voiced by John de Lancie

Alarak is a central figure of the Tal'Darim in the service of Amon. He was first described in the short story Ascension, one of the lead-up short stories before the release of Legacy of the Void. In the story, he holds the title of Fourth Ascendant, a minor leader in the Tal'Darim hierarchy, known as the "Chain of Ascension"; one can only advance in rank through Rak'Shir, a ritual trial by combat of their immediate superior. When the First Ascendant, Nuroka, challenges Highlord Ma'lash for leadership of the Tal'Darim, Alarak remains neutral, until Ma'lash seemed on the brink of defeat; he then declared for him, offering his psionic strength, allowing Ma'lash to defeat Nuroka. With the First, Second, and Third Ascendants claimed in the battle, Alarak is named First Ascendant; however, Ma'lash is wary, and threatens a slow and painful death if Alarak betrays him.

Throughout the ritual, Alarak is filled with doubts as to Amon's goals, which becomes a betrayal as Amon begins to phase out the Tal'Darim and other "mortal" forces, relying more and more on his hybrid. Alarak thus forms an alliance with Artanis, who pledges to aid in bringing down Ma'lash and removing the Tal'Darim from Amon's service. With the aid of Artanis' forces, Alarak challenges Ma'lash to Rak'Shir and defeats him, becoming the new Highlord of the Tal'Darim. Declaring that Amon had lied to them, Alarak promises revenge against Amon, and joins force with Artanis. After Amon is destroyed, Alarak decides to find a new homeworld for the Tal'Darim rather than join the remaining Protoss on Aiur, though he allows any of his people who wish it one chance to remain with Artanis.

Alarak, in Legacy of the Void, possesses immense psionic powers and is always rude and arrogant, exhibiting a sadistic and totalitarian personality. He renounces the concept of freedom and holds zero respect for anything other than the ability to slaughter.

Alarak appears in Nova Covert Ops and is a playable character in Heroes of the Storm.

==== Ji'nara ====
- Voiced by Nicole Oliver

Ji'nara is a Tal'darim protoss warrior who served as a subordinate of Highlord Alarak before succeeding him as the first ascendant of the Tal'darim following the events of the End War. As one of Alarak's ascendants, Ji'nara participated in the Tal'darim's campaigns and challenged opponents in ritual combat to determine rank and authority within their hierarchical society.

After Alarak departed the Tal'darim, Ji'nara became the faction's new Highlord and continued to lead them under the traditions established by their former leader. She later appears in the StarCraft II: Nova Covert Ops missions, where she commands Tal'darim forces and seeks to maintain their position following the upheaval caused by the defeat of Amon.

=== Purifiers ===
The Purifiers are a faction of artificial intelligence beings originally created during the Protoss Empire's technological development as an elite fighting force. Designed to replicate the abilities and personalities of Protoss warriors through artificial bodies, the Purifiers were eventually deactivated after their creators came to fear their independence.

During the End War, the Daelaam rediscovered the Purifiers on the space platform Cybros, where Artanis sought their aid against Amon's forces. Initially distrustful of their creators, the Purifiers eventually joined the Daelaam after Artanis demonstrated a willingness to recognise them as individuals rather than as mere weapons. Their alliance represented the reconciliation of the ancient conflict between the Purifiers and their creators.

One of the Purifiers encountered by Artanis during this period was a warrior whose personality matrix was based on Fenix. Initially believing himself to be Fenix reborn in a new body, Talandar gradually learned the truth about his origins through the combat records of the original Protoss warrior. He eventually accepted his own identity and adopted the name Talandar, becoming an ambassador between the Daelaam and the Purifiers and fighting alongside Artanis in the campaign against Amon.

== Zerg characters ==
The Zerg Swarm is a biologically advanced collective of insectoid aliens directed by an evolving swarm intelligence. The volcanic world of Char serves as The Swarm's "primary hive cluster" in the Koprulu sector. Dedicated to the pursuit of "genetic perfection", the Zerg devour and assimilate advanced species across the galaxy, incorporating useful genetic code. They are a virus; they rapidly consume, mutate, adapt, and propagate in minutes. They thrive in the most inhospitable environments, creating superior strains in the process.

The first broods were formed by the Overmind, with the direction of each brood being delegated to a cerebrate. A brood was engineered for a specific function, which impacted its numerical strength and the diversity of its strains. The Terrans gave the Great War broods reporting names based on beasts found in Earth mythology. During the Brood War, the United Earth Directorate Expeditionary Fleet took control of the Zerg unaligned with Sarah Kerrigan by controlling the second Overmind. The enslaved broods played a critical role in ensuring the UED's temporary dominance of the sector.

The Swarm was reunited under Kerrigan at the end of the Brood War. The cerebrates were eliminated from the Swarm but broods such as the Char Brood remained. Following the eradication of the last cerebrates in Brood War, Kerrigan creates powerful and intelligent broodmothers to fulfill their role in the Swarm. Kerrigan commanded the broodmothers "to fight, to conquer, to be strong, and to lead by force of will." Through decentralizing command hierarchy, Kerrigan ensured that the Zerg Swarm could function without leadership. The strongest of these Zerg broods, The Zagara Brood, was led by Zagara. Following Kerrigan's defeat and de-infestation on Char, the Zagara brood remained there, seeking large egg piles in an acid marsh. Despite General Horace Warfield's extermination campaign against the Zerg remaining on the planet, the brood thrived while all others perished. Its prosperity was interrupted, however, when Kerrigan returned to Char and subjugated Zagara, thereby putting the brood under Kerrigan's control.

Feral Zerg are Zerg not under the control of any higher entity. These Zerg will simply devolve into predatory behavior: acting on the lowest intellectual level, consuming other animals for nourishment, attack everything around them. Control can be re-asserted over feral Zerg by a Broodmother or other command strains however.

=== The Overmind ===
- Voiced by Jack Ritschel in StarCraft; by Paul Eiding in Wings of Liberty

The Overmind is the center of the Zerg Swarm's hive mind society, created by the Xel'Naga as a single consciousness for their experiments on the Zerg. It is the antagonist of StarCraft. At some point during its creation, it was secretly enslaved by the fallen Xel'Naga Amon, who implanted it with a directive to destroy the Protoss and bound the Zerg to a hive mind. The Overmind becomes aware of Xel'Naga, attacking and assimilating its masters. Through this, the Overmind learns of the existence of the Protoss and is determined to assimilate the fellow Xel'Naga-empowered species, believing this will result in perfection. To provide the necessary force to overcome the Protoss, the Overmind targets the psionic potential of the Terrans for assimilation. He also assimilated Sarah Kerrigan so as to create a weapon to free the Zerg from the control of his Dark Master. The Zerg and Protoss clash on various Terran worlds, eventually leading to Zeratul assassinating the cerebrate Zasz. Zasz's death momentarily links the minds of the Overmind and Zeratul, allowing the Overmind to learn the location of the Protoss homeworld Aiur. The Overmind quickly launches an invasion of Aiur and manifests itself on the planet's surface. Following a lengthy and costly campaign on Aiur, Tassadar harnesses the energies of the dark templar to strike at the Overmind directly, disintegrating it.

A second Overmind is created in Brood War, formed from the merging of several cerebrates. This second Overmind never reaches full maturity, and thus lacks the power and intelligence of the original and is much weaker; attacks that were superficial to the first Overmind send the second into remission, although dark templar energies are still needed to kill it. The second Overmind is captured and drugged by the United Earth Directorate, who use its control of the Swarm to bolster its own forces in the Koprulu Sector, but it is ultimately slain by Zeratul.

Following the interpretation of the prophetic fragments recovered by Zeratul on Ulaan by the Preservers of Zhakul in StarCraft II, Zeratul deduces that the "Great Hungerer" referenced by the prophecy refers to the original Overmind, and travels to Aiur to recover whatever memories lingered within the remains of the Overmind's husk. In the course of his investigation, Zeratul encounters the spirit of Tassadar, who passes on vital information he obtained from the Overmind concerning the Queen of Blades, the Hybrid, and the Overmind's vision of one possible future brought about due to the death of Kerrigan. His remains was eventually used by Amon to build his ideal host body, alongside using countless captive Protoss, merging the remains to build the body. It took the whole force of the Protoss to eliminate the body. Alongside Kerrigan, the Overmind was rated the eighth most diabolical video game villain by GamePro.

==== Cerebrates ====
The Overmind is served by cerebrates as secondary agents in the Zerg Swarm, each of which commands an individual brood of Zerg that possesses a distinct tactical role within the hierarchy. Alongside the Overmind, the cerebrates are the only Zerg with full sapience, each with its own personality and methods, although they are genetically incapable of disobeying the Overmind. Cerebrates can be reincarnated by the Overmind upon death, though dark templar energies are capable of preventing this. The death of a cerebrate causes the Overmind to lose control of its respective brood, which will then run amok.

Daggoth is a prominent cerebrate who is in command of the Tiamat Brood, the largest and most powerful brood in the Zerg Swarm, and the most strong-willed and ferocious of the cerebrates. It trains the player character, a young cerebrate, in the Zerg campaign of StarCraft and dispenses forces to protect Kerrigan following her transformation. Daggoth was charged with protecting the Overmind itself. In the wake of the Overmind's death, Daggoth immediately takes command of the fractured Zerg broods and orders several cerebrates to merge to form a new Overmind, but is opposed by Kerrigan. Daggoth perishes in the aftermath of the second Overmind's destruction.

Another prominent cerebrate is Zasz, a clever but somewhat questioning leader who commands the first strike Garm Brood. Kerrigan often argues with Zasz over her impulsive and seemingly rebellious actions; despite the Overmind's confidence that Kerrigan is loyal, Zasz remains suspicious. However, while Tassadar distracts the attention of Kerrigan's forces, Zasz is assassinated by Zeratul. Its death gives the Overmind and Zeratul a temporary mental link, allowing the Overmind to find Aiur and Zeratul to learn the origins of the Zerg. Zasz's final words to Kerrigan proclaim her to be "the doom of us all"; following Kerrigan's rise to power at the culmination of Brood War, Zasz is seemingly proven correct. Ironically, Zeratul's connection with the Overmind, formed after he personally slew Zasz, reveals Kerrigan to be the only hope of resisting the eradication of all life by the Xel'naga Amon.

Various other cerebrates are also featured throughout the series, though following the death of the second Overmind, Metzen explained that all remaining extant cerebrates died, as they were not designed to live without their creator or killed by Kerrigan herself and absorbing their warriors to her side. The pirate Alan Schezar used a khaydarin crystal to control a cerebrate and its brood. Ulrezaj also used khaydarin crystals to achieve similar result.

=== Zagara ===
- Voiced by Nika Futterman

Zagara is a Zerg Broodmother, Kerrigan's second-in-command, and the leader of the Zagara Brood. In the absence of the Queen of Blades, Zagara sought to reunite the Swarm under her own leadership. She rallied the feral Zerg of Char to her side and managed to hold out against the genocidal forces of General Horace Warfield. However, her brute tactics prevented her from achieving victory. When Kerrigan returned to Char, Zagara challenged her authority due to her regained humanity, thus deeming her unworthy to lead the Swarm. Once defeated by Kerrigan, the broodmother was forgiven, and she rejoined Kerrigan's Zerg Swarm forces. Her renewed loyalty is not left unrewarded though, as once Kerrigan ascends to become a Xel'naga, she relinquishes all command over the Zerg Swarm to Zagara, making her the new "Queen of Blades", but only after being evolved by Abathur and subjected to Kerrigan's teaching her some lessons. She is seen in the Epilogue, establishing a foothold over dozens of systems to grant a safe haven for the Zerg Swarm as it rebuilds from the long conflict against the Terrans, the Protoss, and Amon's Hybrids forces.

Zagara also appears as a playable character in Heroes of the Storm.

=== Niadra ===
- Voiced by Courtenay Taylor

Niadra is a Zerg Broodmother. She was created when Sarah Kerrigan placed a parasitic larva within the captured Protoss colonist Lasarra and allows her to be warped back to her people, and tasked her through imprinted memories with eliminating all the Protoss on board the ship. After being teleported on board a Protoss ship bound for Shakuras, Lasarra attempted to warn her compatriots but died as the parasitic larva spawned from her body. Shortly afterwards, it began infesting local fauna kept on board by the Protoss and hid within the ventilation shafts where it found a safe location to mature into a queen. After damaging the vessel's warp drive, Niadra and her brood became the only occupants of the craft, but they had traveled beyond the reach of Kerrigan's ability to communicate. With few other options, Niadra decided to continue the Queen of Blades' last directives: to survive, grow her brood, and destroy the Protoss.

=== Izsha ===
- Voiced by Karen Strassman

Izsha is a Zerg advisor in service to Sarah Kerrigan. She is a unique type of Zerg. Izsha exemplifies a midpoint for Kerrigan, standing between Kerrigan's cold rationality and the feral nature of the Swarm. She harkens back to the ideology of the Overmind, but is still a rational individual. In earlier times, Kerrigan used her to store her thoughts and plans. On at least one occasion, she entrusted Izsha with a plan to infest a planet using the hyper-evolutionary virus through its water supply. Izsha reunited with Kerrigan following the latter's de-infestation and subsequent return to the Swarm. She served as an advisor, recalling memories from Kerrigan's time as the Queen of Blades and helping her to reclaim the Swarm while remaining attached to her queen's leviathan.

While Abathur was designed to be "evil," the concept of Izsha was to strike a balance between human and monster. Unlike Abathur, Izsha was to have a face that the player could talk and relate to, one that Kerrigan could have more of an emotional connection with.

=== Abathur ===
- Voiced by Steve Blum

Abathur is a unique super intelligent Zerg-biologist creature, created from numerous Zerg species. He is the swarm Zerg's evolutionary master craftsman and archivist of the entire Swarm's DNA library. Arrogant and impatient, Abathur loves biodiversity, despises extinction, and instinctively wants to "consume" anything strange or different so that he can absorb, catalogue, and understand it, especially genetic code. Abathur is well mannered, holding true to his ideals of efficiency by often leaving out pronouns and connecting words in his speech. Abathur is constantly connecting DNA, experimenting on strains and studying the Swarm's enemies. Abathur perceives other beings in terms of their raw genetic material, not as sentient beings.

Abathur accepts that while the Overmind's instinctive desire for "true perfection" is impossible for the Zerg Swarm to achieve, he nevertheless finds it a goal worth pursuing in order to keep the Swarm ahead of the competition. Instead, Abathur believed that it is "purpose" that makes the Zerg strong. Abathur states that without an overriding will, "feral Zerg" are lesser than beasts, much like he was after the death of the Overmind. Abathur is personally responsible for the continuation of the Zerg species. He undertakes each experiment as though the survival of the species depends on it alone, and tolerates no genetic regression or evolutionary backstep. It is revealed in Heart of the Swarm that he was the one who designed the Queen of Blades.

In the novel Starcraft: Evolution, set years after the events of Legacy of the Void, Abathur was ordered to create a new breed of zerg called an adostra, which contained xel'naga essence. Overqueen Zagara had intended to use the adostra's vast powers to seed life of ravaged worlds and motion for peace with the Terrans and Protoss. Abathur secretly rejected such ideas, as he believed that war was necessary to continue the evolution of the Swarm. To disrupt Zagara's plans, he crafted Zerg creatures called "chitha" to cause strife between the races and spark a new conflict. However he was defeated, but kept alive and under closer watch by Zagara due to his importance within the Swarm.

Abathur also appears as a playable character in Heroes of the Storm.

=== Primal Zerg ===
The primal Zerg are a Zerg subspecies from the Zerg homeworld, Zerus. They retain the physical and psychological traits of the Zerg prior to the creation of the Overmind. Often resembling reptiles or mammals more than their insectoid Swarm counterparts, the primal zerg are individualistic beings that fight and kill to absorb the genetic essence of their prey and advance their own evolution. Many primal zerg form packs and pursue a Darwinian 'survival-of-the-fittest' philosophy. Consequently, most primal zerg despise the Swarm, seeing them as corrupt for their submission to the hivemind.

==== Dehaka ====
- Voiced by Steve Blum

Dehaka is a primal Zerg pack leader from Zerus who is fixated on adaptation and collecting raw genetic material, which he refers to as "essence"; for Dehaka, "essence" is survival against extinction. Dehaka lost his large right arm prior to the Swarm's return to Zerus; it was later to be found in the same area where Sarah Kerrigan defeated the other primal pack leaders. When the Zerg Swarm returned to Zerus, Dehaka initially opted to simply observe the Swarm and Kerrigan. He witnessed the newcomers awaken Zurvan and the primal-infestation of Kerrigan. Dehaka perceived Kerrigan as the strongest of the Zerg pack leaders, and sides with her against his Primal Zerg brethren, believing Kerrigan would lead them to new "essence". Dehaka correctly predicted that the other Zerg pack leaders would refuse to submit and "adapt"; the other pack leaders were destroyed by Kerrigan, including Zurvan. Kerrigan confronted Dehaka afterwards, confirming that Dehaka had known that Zurvan would turn on her. Dehaka did not deny this, responding with "one Zerg would grow strong, the other would fall". Dehaka was last seen remaining with the Zerg Swarm.

Dehaka also appears as a playable character in Heroes of the Storm

==== Zurvan ====
- Voiced by Frank Welker

Zurvan, the Ancient One, is a primal Zerg of Zerus who had lived for millions of years. Zurvan embodied the "survival of the fittest" ideals the primal Zerg pack leaders operated on. Zurvan was wary of the Overmind and the hive-minded Zerg swarm, believing that losing ones individuality to a single indomitable will is a terrible evolutionary fate for a strong Zerg. He was spawned before the Overmind, and lived to see the return of the Zerg Swarm to Zerus during the Second Great War. It shepherded a deinfested Sarah Kerrigan's rebirth into the Swarm, before challenging her and subsequently being killed and having its essence absorbed by her. Zurvan was younger than the power found in the first spawning pool but older than the first Overmind. It escaped being incorporated into the Swarm hive mind by Amon and remained on Zerus when the Swarm left the planet. In time, it became a pack leader and became immense both in power and physique. By the time the Swarm and a deinfested Sarah Kerrigan returned to Zerus, it had been millennia since Zurvan's last evolution.

== Other characters ==
=== Amon ===
- Voiced by Rick Wasserman

Amon is the primary antagonist of the StarCraft II: Legacy of the Void expansion and the overarching villain of the StarCraft media franchise as a whole. He is described as a malevolent Xel'naga and is the mastermind behind the Protoss-Zerg hybrids. Amon is first alluded to in a discussion between Duran and Zeratul in the Brood War mission Dark Origin, in which he is described as "...a far greater power, a power that has slept for countless ages and is reflected in the creature within that cell." In Wings of Liberty Zeratul's investigation into the Hybrids reveals that Amon's coming has been foretold; initially, he is described as "one who shall break the cycle of the gods." On Zhakul, Amon's role in the Ulan prophecy is further elaborated on, and it is here that he is first referred to as the "fallen one." After arriving on Aiur to retrieve the surviving memories from the remains of the Overmind, Zeratul encounters the spirit of Tassadar; from both beings Zeratul gains a glimpse into one possible future in which the Overmind foresaw Amon successfully employ his hybrids and the Zerg to annihilate the Protoss before turning on and wiping out the Zerg. In this future, Amon taunted the Protoss by revealing Kerrigan to be the only one in a position to oppose him.

During Heart of the Swarm events

In Heart of the Swarm Amon's identity and initial background are revealed. Amon came to Zerus after the other Xel'naga molded the Zerg. Desiring the Zerg's power to absorb the essence of their prey for his own goals, he connected many Zerg to a hivemind and later forced an overriding directive on the Overmind: the destruction of the Protoss. Millennia before the start of the series, Amon died after a war with the other Xel'Naga who had discovered his work with the Zerg, but work on the hybrids continued under the direction of the shape shifter Emil Narud. Sarah Kerrigan learned about Amon when she traveled to Zerus, and came to realize his lingering influence over the Zerg swarm was a major reason behind her crimes as the Queen of Blades. Kerrigan later learned about Narud's attempts to restore Amon to life, and attacked the shape-shifter's lab in order to stop him. Although Kerrigan defeated Narud, the shape-shifter used his dying words to reveal that he had already accomplished his goal: Amon had returned. Reflecting on her fight with Narud, Stukov speculated that the Xel'naga device used to de-infest Kerrigan may have actually had a hand in somehow reviving Amon. He noted that the original Queen of Blades had tremendous power, and that the device couldn't just simply erase it, surmising that it had to "go somewhere." After exacting her revenge on Arcturus Mengsk, Kerrigan took the Zerg swarm to hunt down Amon to try to keep him from enslaving the Zerg again.

During Whispers of Oblivion events

In the Whispers of Oblivion campaign released by Blizzard ahead of the upcoming Legacy of the Void, Amon is revealed to have been resurrected in the Sigma Quadrant's Atrias System. Since his resurrection he has been under the protection of the Tal'Darim, a fanatical Protoss branch devoted to Amon.

In addition to the above-mentioned names, Amon is also referenced as "a malevolent presence within the void" by Zeratul in Wings of Liberty, the "Dark Voice" in the game captions, and "the dark god" in the prequel Whispers of Oblivion campaign. During his auditory taunts in the Wings of Liberty mission In Utter Darkness, a pair of glowing red eyes can be seen, but there is little else visually distinguishable about the character in the mission despite the fact that raw data exists for Amon in the map editor.

During Legacy of the Void events

Amon was the main villain in Legacy of the Void, though he did not appear in his true form until the epilogue campaign "Into the Void". He seizes control of the Khala, controlling most of the Protoss as they attempted to retake Aiur. Zeratul and other protoss who had their nerve cords cut were immune to that control. In his last act before being killed by the possessed Artanis, Zeratul severed the Hierarch's nerve cords, cutting him off from the Khala. Artanis rallies what few managed to avoid corruption and flees Aiur on the Spear of Adun, rallying an army to fight Amon's forces and destroy his power base, before returning to Aiur with the Keystone (the Xel'Naga artifact used to purge Kerrigan of her own corruption). Convincing the possessed Khalai to sever their cords and break away from the Khala, their action sends Amon's essence into the artifact, which then implodes, banishing his essence into the Void.

As the protoss celebrate their victory, however, Artanis and Jim Raynor are summoned by Kerrigan to Ulnar, the former Xel'Naga homeworld, which contains a gateway into the Void; Kerrigan seeks their help in going through and ending Amon once and for all. Fighting through Amon's minions, led by a reincarnated Duran/Narud, the trio release an imprisoned Xel'Naga named Ouros, who had appeared to both Zeratul and Artanis in the form of their deceased friend Tassadar to guide them towards his intended aim: For Kerrigan to ascend to become Xel'Naga herself, and use her powers to kill Amon, as only a Xel'Naga could defeat him for good. With the aid of Artanis and Raynor's armies, Kerrigan undergoes the ascension, and destroys Amon forever with a final blast of energy.

The xel'naga regularly conducted experiments on other species as part of their "natural life cycle". Two species, one with the "purity of form" and another with the "purity of essence", would merge naturally to create a new iteration of Xel'naga. This process had occurred numerous times. To this purpose, the last incarnation of the xel'naga uplifted the protoss and zerg, intending for them to lead to the culmination of another iteration of the cycle. Contrary to the xel'naga's intent, the hybrids were the result of a perversion of the process. Amon's servants created hybrids to aid his plan to dominate creation. Overt knowledge of the hybrids began spreading among the terrans, protoss, and zerg, after the Brood War, and most who knew understood the dire threat the hybrids posed to the status quo.

=== Shapeshifter ===
The shapeshifter is an enigmatic and mysterious character in the StarCraft Universe. Very little is known about this creature, beyond the fact that the shapeshifter was in fact a Xel'Naga, and by its own admission had adopted many aliases throughout its several millennia of existence. In each case that the shapeshifter appeared in a meaningful role, the creature has assumed the form of a Terran Male. The Shapeshifter's allegiance was to the fallen Xel'Naga Amon, and accordingly its actions were to further Amon's own goals.

After Blizzard confirmed Duran's return in Heart of the Swarm, and tacitly implied that he may have appeared in Wings of Liberty, many assumed that the character was reincarnated as Emil Narud. To support this position, fans point to the fact that Narud was revealed in Heart of the Swarm to be an ancient shapeshifter serving Amon (fitting his description of himself in Brood War as "a servant of a far greater power"), and moreover, "Narud" is "Duran" spelled backwards. Although this was observed and commented/discussed by fans in the series, Blizzard made no definitive effort to merge the two characters until the release of Whispers of Oblivion, a three part prequel campaign to Legacy of the Void. In Whispers of Oblivion, Zeratul confirmed that Samir Duran and Emil Narud were indeed the same individual.

Alias as Samir Duran

- Voiced by Cástulo Guerra

The shapeshifter makes its initial appearance as Samir Duran, an enigmatic ex-Confederate Ghost operative introduced in Brood War. Duran was highly intelligent and manipulative, as well as knowledgeable about both the Protoss and Zerg. A former lieutenant in Alpha Squadron, Duran formed a small commando unit after the fall of the Confederacy to fight Mengsk's Dominion.

Duran quickly allied with the United Earth Directorate's expeditionary force, and used UED resources to mount an assassination attempt on Mengsk and provided vital intelligence and strategic advice on the Dominion to DuGalle. Duran convinced DuGalle to destroy the psi disruptor, to Stukov's chagrin, and as the UED closed in on Mengsk and his allies, Duran sabotaged a key operation, allowing the emperor to escape. When Stukov reconstructed the psi disruptor, Duran killed him and revealed his allegiance was actually to Sarah Kerrigan.

With Duran as her advisor, Kerrigan successfully established command over the entirety of the Zerg Swarm. However, Duran vanished shortly afterwards. In a secret mission, he was discovered by Zeratul engineering a Protoss/Zerg hybrid. Duran ominously explained that he "had many names throughout the millennia", that his work has little to do with Kerrigan, and that he served "a far greater power".

Alias as Dr. Emil Narud

- Voiced by Armin Shimerman; by Patrick Seitz after revealing identity

Four years after the events of Brood War, the shapeshifter reemerged in the Korpulu Sector, now going by the persona Dr. Emil Narud – an enigmatic scientist first introduced in Wings of Liberty and later appearing in Heart of the Swarm. Narud was the head of the Moebius Foundation and was viewed as a genius on Zerg biology and an expert on Protoss and Xel'Naga technology.

In Wings of Liberty, Narud and the Moebius Foundation backed Tychus Findlay's contact with James Raynor as a way to get around an imperial decree from Arcturus Mengsk that made it illegal to traffic in alien goods. Narud would later appear by proxy as the Moebius Foundation's representative during a mission briefing on Tyrador, wherein Narud lent James Raynor his medical transport ships to help Raynor destroy the foundation's data cores in order to prevent the Queen of Blades from gaining access to them. On the eve of the invasion of Char, Raynor learned from Valerian that Narud had been working with the Dominion's Crown Prince for the entire duration of the game. In the aftermath of the successful de-infestation of the Queen of Blades, a civil war erupts between Arcturus and Valerian; in an attempt to find a safe haven, Valerian and Raynor seek shelter with the Moebius Foundation. Initially, Narud greeted and temporarily sheltered the group, but after examining the Xel'Naga artifact and thoroughly questioning Raynor about Kerrigan, Narud revealed his allegiance to Arcturus and sold out the group to an incoming Dominion fleet, but the fleet's attempt to kill Kerrigan fails.

Narud later reappeared in Heart of the Swarm after former UED Vice Admiral Alexei Stukov contacted Kerrigan with a message to seek out the Skygeirr Station research facility orbiting Ketill IV. Upon her arrival at the facility, Stukov explained to Kerrigan that Skygeirr housed the Dominion's primary Hybrid research and development laboratory, and that "Emil Narud" was actually an ancient shapeshifter in the employment of a fallen Xel'Naga named Amon. After the Zerg swarm breached the interior of the facility and began attacking the Hybrids within, Narud made his initial appearance, broadcasting a message throughout the facility to inform Kerrigan that she was not welcome in the station. After the Swarm breached the lowest level, Narud personally moved to kill Kerrigan by driving a null zone towards the Queen of Blades. When the null zone attack failed, Narud retreated inside a Xel'Naga temple dedicated to Amon. In a showdown with Kerrigan, Narud taunted the Queen of Blades by using his shapeshifting abilities – first morphing into Jim Raynor, and then into Kerrigan's own human form, in which he wounded Kerrigan with a psi blade similar to that wielded by the Protoss. Kerrigan gained the upper hand in the end, impaling Narud with her wing-spikes. With his dying breath, Narud proclaimed that Amon had been resurrected and that she would see him soon.

During the epilogue campaign, the combined forces of Kerrigan, Raynor and Artanis ventured into the void in order to rescue "Tassadar" (really Ouros) and encountered Narud, who was Ouros's jailer. After a difficult battle Narud's forces were overpowered and Narud was cornered by not only Artanis Kerrigan and Raynor, but Alexei Stukov, who called him "Duran." He asked Duran if he remembered what he had done to him, and Narud assumed Stukov was simply there to gloat. Stukov said "No, I'm here to say good night you son of a bitch." (an echo of the words Duran had said right before shooting him). He then shot Narud with a psychic blast, finishing him for good.

=== Marr ===
Maar is a Protoss-Zerg Hybrid created through the combination of Protoss and Zerg genetic material as part of Amon's plans. He serves as an early indication of the threat posed by Amon's forces. During Zeratul's investigations, Maar captures Protoss Preservers on Zhakul and attempts to prevent the revelation of Amon's return, while demonstrating his immense psionic abilities.

=== Ouros ===
- Voiced by Michael Dorn

Ouros was one of the Xel'Naga who helped construct the material universe and seed it with life to perpetuate the Infinite Cycle. At some point, he was captured by Amon while the rest of his race was extinguished. He was chained in the Void, which was twisted to the will of Amon. However, he could still subtly influence the material universe, leaving clues to help guide his creations to rescue him by using Tassadar's form (Zeratul and Artanis) and voices (Kerrigan).

== Merchandise ==
The first series of the collectable statues, from left to right: a terran firebat, a zerg hydralisk, and Tassadar.

The characters of StarCraft have been popular enough to inspire the creation of several collectable statues and toys. The first series of statues was released by ToyCom in 2003, consisting of a firebat with markings similar to some original StarCraft concept art for the firebat, a hydralisk, and one of Tassadar with a ceremonial sword, which is also seen in concept art for the original game. A series of toys were also made available in 1998, featuring two variations of the marine, another hydralisk, and a Protoss zealot. In addition, 1/30 scale model kits for the marine and hydralisk were released in 1999 by Academy Hobby Model Kits.

A second series of collectible statues, which included Infested Kerrigan, Zeratul, and a Terran ghost, was in development but appears to have been cancelled. However, upon announcement of StarCraft II in 2007, Blizzard released a new collectible statue depicting Wings of Liberty mascot character Tychus Findlay.

== Critical reception ==
The characters and story of the StarCraft series have been received with praise and only minute criticism by many game reviewers. The GameSpot review of StarCraft described the voice acting as "great", stating that it brings the characters to life. GameSpot goes further in the review for Brood War, commenting that the story and dialogue are with only a few exceptions "brilliantly written" and "one of the year's best stories in any gaming genre". The reviewer of StarCraft for IGN praises the melding of the story into the gameplay and implies that the development of the characters during the course of the story, particularly that of Kerrigan, is unforgettable. In addition, the review of Brood War puts the storyline as "solid".

Gaming Revolution echoed this praise, saying the plot is "fantastic", but the reviewer added that he felt it was "over too quickly". At GamePro.com, the reviewer cited that he felt "the characters were talking to me" and even expressed a development of an emotional attachment to the character of Raynor. Electric Playground put the story as the best part of the game, if a little derivative, but described the voice acting as "really quite excellent".

== See also ==
- Characters of Overwatch, one of the four primary Blizzard Entertainment franchises
