= StarCraft II: Heart of the Swarm =

- StarCraft II: Heart of the Swarm cover artwork, depicting protagonist Sarah Kerrigan
- Developer: Blizzard Entertainment
- Publisher: Blizzard Entertainment
- Designers: Dustin Browder; Matthew Morris
- Artist: Samwise Didier
- Writers: Chris Metzen; Brian Kindregan
- Composers: Glenn Stafford; Jason Hayes; Russell Brower; Neal Acree; Derek Duke
- Series: StarCraft
- Platforms: Microsoft Windows, macOS
- Release: March 12, 2013
- Genre: Real-time strategy
- Modes: Single-player, multiplayer

StarCraft II: Heart of the Swarm is an expansion pack to the military science fiction real-time strategy game StarCraft II: Wings of Liberty, and the second part of the StarCraft II trilogy developed by Blizzard Entertainment, with the final part being Legacy of the Void. The game was released on March 12, 2013.

The expansion includes additional units and multiplayer changes from Wings of Liberty, as well as a continuing campaign focusing on the Zerg race and following Sarah Kerrigan in her effort to regain control of the swarm and exact her revenge on the Terran Dominion's emperor, Arcturus Mengsk.

During BlizzCon 2017, Blizzard announced that StarCraft II would be re-branded as a free-to-play game, hence opening the multiplayer mode to everybody and bringing some changes to previously paid features of the game. The Wings of Liberty campaign was made completely free while the campaigns for Heart of the Swarm and Legacy of the Void still required payment. However, those who had already bought Wings of Liberty before the free-to-play announcement were granted access to the Heart of the Swarm campaign free of charge. This new free-to-play model and changes to the availability of the campaigns was in line with Blizzard's vision to support the game differently going forward. Micro-transactions such as Skins, Co-op Commanders, Voice Packs, and the War Chests proved to be successful enough to sustain StarCraft II as a story-driven and eSport title.

== Gameplay ==
Heart of the Swarm features a single-player campaign with 20 missions (plus seven evolution missions which allow the player to upgrade units), and continues the story from Wings of Liberty. The player plays from the perspective of Sarah Kerrigan, recently returned to her human form by Jim Raynor. Similar to Wings of Liberty, the briefing room allows interactive exploration, this time on the Leviathan, an enormous Zerg breed which functions as a bioship. Kerrigan and her allies are located in the nerve center. She has a personal chamber for altering her abilities, and there is an evolution pit where she can upgrade her units and perform evolution missions with the evolution master Abathur.

At BlizzCon 2011, it was revealed that Heart of the Swarm would feature seven new multiplayer units, while removing three units and changing the abilities of existing units and buildings. The exact modifications have since changed. In a blog post, game director Dustin Browder explained the current status of the units.

=== Terrans ===
The Terrans were originally expected to feature two new units: the Shredder and Warhound. The Shredder was a mobile, burrowing turret based on the design of the Zerg Spine Crawler, attacking via clouds of toxic gas that were devastating to biological units. Internal testing revealed the Shredder was too flexible and powerful, and it was therefore replaced by the Widow Mine, a mobile burrowing unit that fires missiles, causing splash damage. The Warhound was a bipedal combat walker with an arm-mounted high-calibre cannon; it also possessed a missile for use against mechanical units. During the closed beta testing phase, pro gamers decried the Warhound for failing to function as intended; it was ultimately removed from multiplayer gameplay although it can be fought in the single-player campaign.

Several Terran units were modified in Heart of the Swarm. The Hellion, a four-wheeled buggy with a swivel-mounted flamethrower, gains the ability to transform into the Hellbat, a bipedal walker, whose flamethrower strikes in a fan shape instead of in a line. The Hellbat counts as both biological and mechanical, and can therefore be either repaired by SCVs or healed by Medivacs and Medics. The Medivac gains an "Ignite Afterburners" upgrade which acts as a cooldown-based speed boost. The Reaper has undergone extensive changes. It no longer does extra damage to light units, and its grenade, used only on buildings, has been removed entirely. It now has a passive health-regeneration ability that kicks in several seconds after the Reaper last took damage. Additionally, it no longer needs a Tech Lab add-on to be produced, allowing Heart of the Swarm players to train two of them at a time using the Reactor add-on.

=== Protoss ===
The Protoss were originally expected to feature the Replicant, a unit which could transform into a clone of any other unit in play, including those controlled by the enemy. This unit was ultimately cut from the game because of its tendency to stifle unit diversity. Three new units made it into the game: the Oracle, Tempest, and Mothership Core.

The Oracle is a fast, spellcasting, flying unit; it has no abilities that do not require the consumption of Energy. Its original version focused on slowing down economy by blocking off mineral access for a short period of time. It was decided that the ability was too powerful and that it should cause mining to slow, instead of to stop, and thus was replaced with the powerful Pulsar Beam. A single Oracle can kill worker units very quickly with Pulsar Beam, but will just as swiftly drain its Energy reserves. The Oracle also has two other abilities: Revelation, which reveals enemy units and buildings within an area, and Envision, which grants Oracle the ability to detect invisible or burrowed units.

The Tempest is a large, slow flying unit that was originally developed in the Wings of Liberty beta as a replacement for Carriers. (Blizzard have tried to remove Carriers from the game before both StarCraft II releases, only to put them back in due to overwhelming fan demand.) After Wings of Liberty, in which it functioned basically like a Carrier, it was revised in Heart of the Swarm to provide large amounts of aerial splash damage, and then again to do extra damage to Massive units. It is slow and does not fire often, but has very long range, requiring a spotter to make the most of its reach.

The Mothership Core is a slow-moving flying unit that has three abilities: Photon Overcharge (previously known as Purify) allows a targeted Nexus to gain a single-target, long-range energy attack, similar to the Photon Cannon; Mass Recall warps Protoss units around Mothership Core, and the Core itself, to any targeted Nexus; finally, Time Warp slows down enemy ground units' movement and refire rate in an area. Once a Protoss building called Fleet Beacon is constructed, the Mothership Core can transform into the Mothership from Wings, trading in its Photon Overcharge for the mass cloaking field. However, the iconic Vortex ability has been removed entirely to make room for Time Warp, as Blizzard felt the ability was too powerful.

In addition to the new units, the Void Ray's Prismatic Beam has become an active ability that temporarily increases damage against armored units only, while the original effect of gradually increasing damage over time has been removed.

=== Zerg ===
The Zerg gained two new units, the Viper and the Swarm Host. Like the Oracle, the Viper is a flying spellcaster with no integral weapons. It has several abilities: "Blinding Cloud" reduces the range of enemy units to 1; "Abduct" pulls a unit to the Viper's location; "Consume" allows the Viper to steal health from a friendly structure to increase its energy. The Viper is intended to support large Zerg armies, whereas the Oracle is designed for early-game harassment.

The Swarm Host also lacks any sort of basic attack. Its strength is revealed when it burrows underground: it then begins to periodically spawn Locusts, insectile creatures with low health, high damage output, and slow movement. This ability allows Swarm Hosts to attack from long range (and underground), and it does not cost any resources or Energy. Swarm Hosts are not very effective in small numbers, but past a certain critical mass, their ongoing waves of Locusts can become overwhelming, winning wars of attrition with free throwaway units. The Locusts are unable to attack air units, however, requiring other units or Spore Crawlers to defend the Swarm Hosts.

The Hydralisk has regained its speed boost upgrade from Brood War. Additionally, both "Burrow" and the Overlord movement speed boost may be researched at the Hatchery, no longer requiring a Lair to be built.

In the single-player campaign mode, each Zerg combat unit may be evolved into either of two possible alternative versions, each with a powerful, characteristic trait (for instance, the Torrasque strain of the Ultralisk has the ability to revive itself upon death). In addition, there are "primal" versions which are elements of the plot and sport a radically different look (the differences are akin to those between regular and mercenary units in Wings of Liberty). Primal zerg may not be produced. There are no mobile Zerg cloak detection units or troop transport units in the campaign mode; as a result, any cloaked units, such as the Protoss Dark Templar and Terran Banshee, are either completely absent (in the case of the former) or do not make use of their cloaking abilities (in the case of the latter and the Ghost).

== Plot ==
Following the events of Wings of Liberty, Terran Dominion forces attack Sarah Kerrigan and her allies in a research facility in the territory of the Umojan Protectorate. Kerrigan and other residents escape to the flagship of Raynor's Raiders, the Hyperion, but Commander Jim Raynor is cut off by the Dominion. The Hyperion escapes, but Kerrigan remains behind to locate Raynor, only to hear a Dominion newscast announcing that he has been captured and executed. Enraged, Kerrigan returns to Zerg territory to retake control of the swarm and overthrow the tyrannical Dominion.

On the volcanic planet Char, Kerrigan subdues a renegade brood led by the broodmother Zagara, who refuses to join Kerrigan's Swarm until she proves she is truly the Queen of Blades. Kerrigan, impressed by Zagara's strength and desire to lead a strong and independent Zerg, lets her live, and Zagara begins to learn from Kerrigan. On Char, Kerrigan and her Zerg attack the occupying Dominion forces. In a rage, Kerrigan destroys a Dominion command fortress and kills its commander, General Horace Warfield. After a change of heart, she allows the wounded and the unarmed to evacuate. On the frozen planet Kaldir, she annihilates the local Protoss forces, reclaiming the local brood and evolving the swarm to survive in the harsh climate.

Zeratul visits Kerrigan and advises her to regain her powers by traveling to Zerus, the original homeworld of the Zerg. On Zerus, Kerrigan learns that a fallen Xel'Naga named Amon was responsible for making the Zerg what they are: a warring swarm, bound to a single overriding will. Some primal Zerg, however, eluded Amon and remained independently evolving creatures. One such Zerg, named Zurvan, known as the "Ancient One", lies dormant in hibernation and must be awoken by Kerrigan for its knowledge on the origins of the Zerg. Upon awakening, Zurvan advises Kerrigan to seek out the primordial spawning pool – from which the first Zerg arose eons ago – to regain her former powers. Kerrigan enters the ancient spawning pool and transforms into a primal Queen of Blades. She kills and absorbs the genetic essences of four powerful hostile primal leaders and later Zurvan after it attempts to collect her essence for itself. A primal leader called Dehaka and his pack join her, provided that she gives them essence to collect.

Kerrigan is contacted by a Zerg-infested Alexei Stukov, a former Vice Admiral of the United Earth Directorate who was apparently killed by Duran at Braxis. With Stukov's aid, Kerrigan assaults a research station where Emil Narud, a servant of Amon, is breeding Protoss-Zerg hybrids. After eliminating Dominion facility security forces and Tal'Darim loyal to Narud, Kerrigan confronts Narud in a showdown of power. Morphing first into Raynor and then into Kerrigan's human form, Narud impales Kerrigan before being fatally wounded. Revealing that Amon is revived, he perishes.

Meanwhile, Emperor Arcturus Mengsk contacts Kerrigan and claims Raynor is kept alive and imprisoned, as a bargaining chip against Kerrigan attacking the Dominion throne world of Korhal IV. Kerrigan relays the news to the Hyperion. They plan to hack the Dominion network to locate Raynor, but the only one with such expertise is Colonel Orlan, who is being held captive by Mira Han, a mercenary who refuses to release him. Thus, the Hyperion attacks Mira's mining operations, forcing her to comply. Orlan locates Raynor on a prison ship that constantly changes location. Kerrigan assaults the ship and rescues Raynor, who is revolted by Kerrigan's reversion of form. Although he cannot bring himself to shoot Kerrigan, he tells her that they are done despite her confession that she loves him.

Having united all Zerg under the swarm, Kerrigan launches an invasion of Korhal, concentrating on the capital city of Augustgrad. With the aid of Dehaka and his pack, she destroys Mengsk's Psi Destroyer, a device that hurts the swarm from afar but is ineffective on the primal Zerg. As Kerrigan sends the swarm to assault Mengsk's palace, Crown Prince Valerian urges her to slow down her invasion to minimize civilian losses; she accepts, understanding that Valerian is not like his father. This conversation is also witnessed by Raynor, who sees her attempt to save civilian lives as proof of her character. Midway through the final battle, Raynor arrives to assist Kerrigan, much to her surprise. Together, they succeed in breaching the imperial palace. In the confrontation that follows, Mengsk reveals that he has the Xel'Naga artifact in his possession, intending to use it to kill Kerrigan. Before Mengsk can do so, Raynor interferes, allowing Kerrigan to impale Mengsk. Kerrigan kills Mengsk by injecting psionic energy, causing him to explode.

As the dust settles, Kerrigan thanks Raynor before joining her swarm. Raynor simply replies, "My pleasure darlin'. Always was." With her quest for vengeance completed, Kerrigan renounces everything she once was or had and prepares to face Amon, the enemy of all living things, in a conflict that will not only decide the fate of the Koprulu Sector but of the entire galaxy.

== Development ==
The development of StarCraft II was announced on May 19, 2007, at the Blizzard Worldwide Invitational in Seoul, South Korea. At the June 2008 Blizzard Worldwide Invitational, Blizzard Executive Vice President Rob Pardo said that StarCraft II was to be released as a trilogy of games, starting with Wings of Liberty, focused on the Terrans, followed by Heart of the Swarm, revolving around the Zerg, and finally Legacy of the Void, devoted to the Protoss. Blizzard's storyboard team was already working on Heart of the Swarm in early 2010 while Wings of Liberty's gameplay was refined. Wings of Liberty was released July 27, 2010 to much critical acclaim.

A few updates will be made to the game's graphics engine, including upgrades to the look and behavior of Zerg creep, as well as some improvements to the rendering of game environments. However, the expansion will have the same hardware requirements as Wings of Liberty.

On April 30, 2012, Blizzard announced that the latest multiplayer build of Heart of the Swarm would be playable at the MLG Spring Championship (June 8–10) ahead of a planned beta release. No actual release dates were specified. As of June 15, 2012, the game was primarily complete; only "tuning and polishing" remained.

On August 15, 2012, Blizzard announced that the multiplayer beta would be beginning soon. As of September 4, 2012, Blizzard began closed beta testing of the multiplayer beta, releasing it to select professional gamers, members of the press, Arcade contest winners, and shoutcasters. The beta testers were not under a non-disclosure agreement, so they were free to stream their games, release pictures, etc. The Heart of the Swarm beta closed on March 1, 2013.

Blizzard officially released Heart of the Swarm for PC and Mac systems in multiple countries on March 12, 2013.

== Release and reception ==
StarCraft II: Heart of the Swarm

Aggregate scores
Aggregator	Score
GameRankings	86.39%
Metacritic	86/100

Review scores
Publication	Score
Edge	90/100
Eurogamer	9/10
Game Informer	8.75/10
GamesRadar+	4.5/5
IGN	8.6/10
Joystiq	4/5
PC Gamer (UK)	91%
VideoGamer.com	9/10

StarCraft II: Heart of the Swarm sold approximately 1.1 million copies worldwide in its first two days on sale, and was the top-selling PC game for the first quarter of 2013.

StarCraft II: Heart of the Swarm received "generally favorable reviews" from critics according to review aggregator Metacritic. PC Gamer gave the game a score of 91%, calling it "A traditional RTS essential for anyone interested in competitive strategy games, and highly recommended for anyone who isn't." Daniel Shannon, writing for GameSpot, rated the game 8/10, lauding the game's "fantastically diverse campaign and entertaining online play" while criticizing the writing as "lackluster". He criticized the characterization of protagonist Kerrigan as "boring, and her actions are often incomprehensible".

=== Awards ===
The cinematics from Heart of the Swarm received the 2013 Golden Reel Award for Best Sound & Music Editing: Computer Interactive Entertainment from the Motion Picture Sound Editors society. During the 17th Annual D.I.C.E. Awards, the Academy of Interactive Arts & Sciences nominated Heart of the Swarm for "Strategy/Simulation Game of the Year".

=== Special editions ===
In addition to the standard game, Heart of the Swarm is offered in two special variants for purchase: Digital Deluxe and Collector's Edition. These versions provide items in addition to the game itself. DVD versions of Heart of the Swarm require an additional content download of approximately 8 gigabytes of data before the game can be played for the first time.

The Digital Deluxe provides the following:

1. A special in-game skin for the Ultralisk unit
2. Three portraits and three decals for use in Heart of the Swarm
3. A Baneling pet for use in World of Warcraft
4. A Heart of the Swarm-themed apparel item and banner for use in Diablo III

The Collector's Edition provides all of the items of the Digital Deluxe, as well as the following:

1. A 144-page artwork book
2. A mousepad bearing a picture of a battle between Zerg and Terrans
3. Behind the scenes Blu-ray/DVD set
4. a CD with 11 audio tracks from the game

=== Soundtrack ===
StarCraft II: Heart of the Swarm Soundtrack

Soundtrack album by Glenn Stafford, Derek Duke, Neal Acree, Russell Brower, Jason Hayes, Cris Velasco
- Released: March 12, 2013 (CE/Digital); November 8, 2013 (Volume II)
- Genre: Video game soundtrack
- Length: 74:33 (Volume I); 49:45 (Volume II)
- Label: Azeroth Music

The soundtrack for Heart of the Swarm was released in two volumes. The first soundtrack was released as part of the Collector's Edition and as a separate iTunes release; the second soundtrack was released initially at BlizzCon 2013 as an exclusive promotional CD, and is currently available at Blizzard's official store.

StarCraft II: Heart of the Swarm Soundtrack
No.	Title	Writer(s)	Length
1.	"Corruptors"	Glenn Stafford, Derek Duke & Neal Acree	7:50
2.	"Heart of the Swarm"	Neal Acree & Cris Velasco	7:13
3.	"Collateral Damage"	Glenn Stafford & Neal Acree	5:16
4.	"Fire in the Sky"	Glenn Stafford, Derek Duke & Neal Acree	8:03
5.	"Stronger"	Glenn Stafford, Derek Duke & Neal Acree	6:19
6.	"The Coming Storm"	Glenn Stafford, Derek Duke & Neal Acree	7:13
7.	"Conscience"	Glenn Stafford, Neal Acree & Jason Hayes	7:31
8.	"Phantoms of the Void"	Glenn Stafford, Derek Duke, Neal Acree & Russell Brower	7:16
9.	"He Had It Coming"	Russell Brower & Neal Acree	6:38
10.	"Ascension"	Glenn Stafford, Derek Duke & Neal Acree	5:57
11.	"Whispering from the Stars"	Russell Brower & Neal Acree	5:17
Total length:			74:33

StarCraft II: Heart of the Swarm Soundtrack Volume II
No.	Title	Writer(s)	Length
1.	"Change"	Stafford, Duke, Acree, Brower	4:25
2.	"Evolution"	Stafford, Duke, Acree, Brower	4:13
3.	"Worlds Will Burn"	Stafford, Duke, Acree, Brower	3:19
4.	"Conviction"	Stafford, Duke, Acree, Brower	6:45
5.	"Kaldir"	Stafford, Duke, Acree, Brower	4:38
6.	"Queen"	Stafford, Duke, Acree, Brower	4:26
7.	"Zerus"	Stafford, Duke, Acree, Brower	5:47
8.	"Believe"	Stafford, Duke, Acree, Brower	3:51
9.	"True Enemy"	Stafford, Duke, Acree, Brower	3:44
10.	"Dark in Me"	Stafford, Duke, Acree, Brower	2:57
11.	"Heaven and Earth"	Stafford, Duke, Acree, Brower	2:23
12.	"The Old Directorate"	Stafford, Duke, Acree, Brower	3:17
Total length:			49:45

== Professional competition ==
The release of the expansion saw a short-term renewal of interest in StarCraft II's competitive multiplayer scene and brought about the standardization of competition by Blizzard Entertainment through the redesigned StarCraft II World Championship Series, but saw a long-term decline in interest, sponsorship, and viewership. Following the transition of the title to free-to-play two years after the release of Legacy of the Void, the second and final StarCraft II expansion, the game has experienced a resurgence in interest.
