= Artanis =

Artanis may refer to:

- Artanis (StarCraft), a fictional character in the StarCraft series and Heroes of the Storm
- Artanis, an alias for Galadriel, a character in J. R. R. Tolkien's Middle-earth Legendarium
- Artanis Entertainment Group, a movie production and licensing company owned by the estate of the late entertainer Frank Sinatra ("Artanis" is "Sinatra" spelled backwards)
