= James Harper (actor) =

American actor

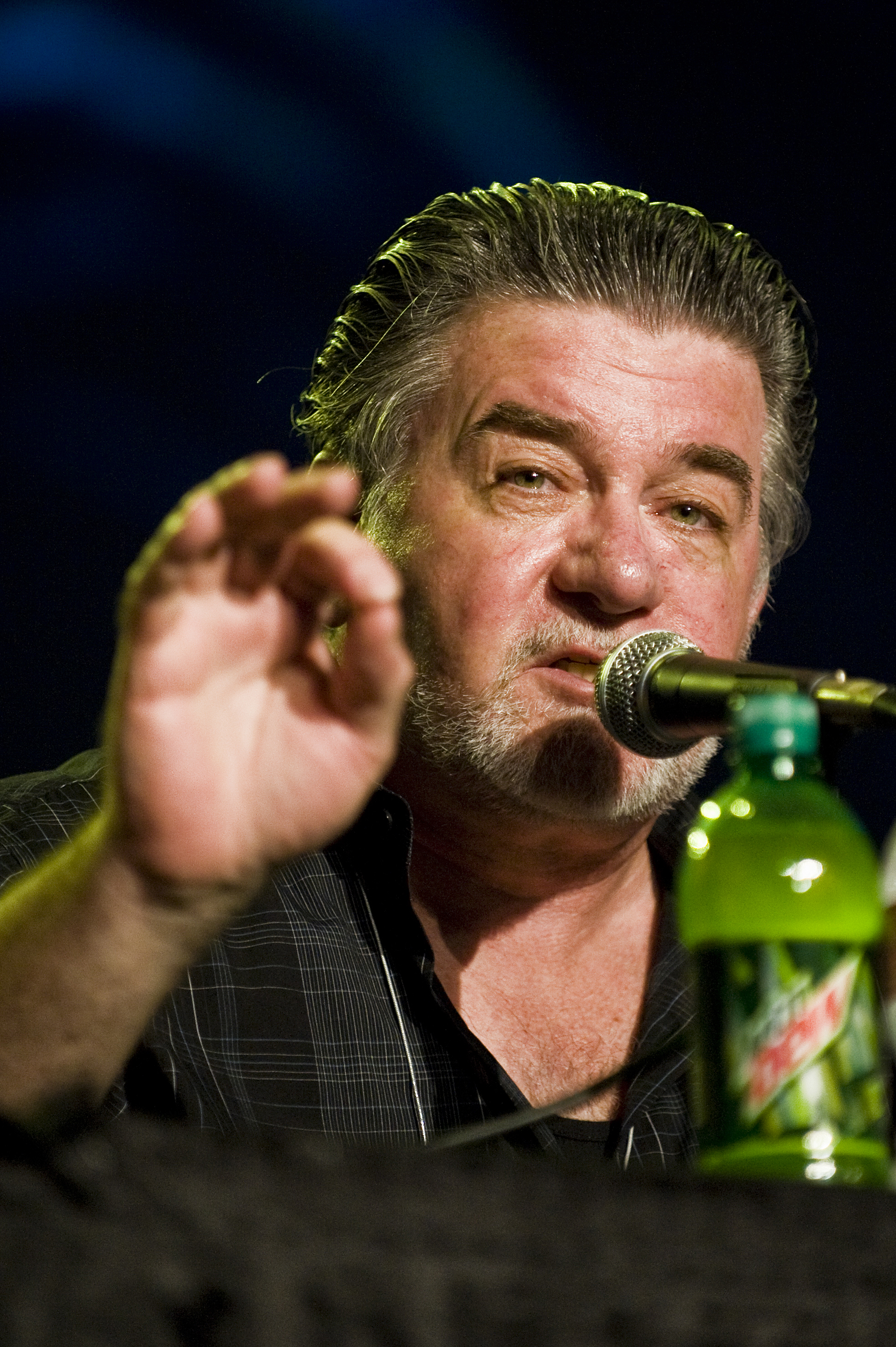
- Harper at BlizzCon 2009
- Born: Bell, California, US
- Education: Juilliard School (BFA)
- Occupation: Actor
- Years active: 1974–Present

James Harper is an American actor. He has been in movies and guest-starred on television shows including Frasier, Matlock, NYPD Blue, Star Trek: Deep Space Nine, and JAG. He also played the role of Admiral Kelso in the 1998 film Armageddon. In addition to acting, Harper has contributed his voice to several video games, most notably StarCraft as Arcturus Mengsk, Resistance: Fall of Man, and Diablo II. Harper reprised his role of Arcturus Mengsk in StarCraft II: Wings of Liberty and StarCraft II: Heart of the Swarm.

Harper portrayed Louisiana State Senator Willie Rainach in the 1989 film Blaze, with Paul Newman as Governor Earl Long.
