= Artana =

Artana may refer to several places:

- Artana, Spain, a town and municipality in the Valencian Community
- Artana, Georgia, a village in the Telavi district
- Artana, Kosovo, a town and municipality in the Pristina district

== See also ==
- Artane (disambiguation)
