= Artan (given name) =

- Gender: Male

Origin
- Region of origin: Albania

Artan is a predominantly Albanian language masculine given name.

Notable people bearing the name Artan include:

- Artan Bano (born 1966), Albanian footballer
- Artan Bushati (1963–2013), Albanian football coach
- Artan Cuku (1975–2017), Albanian Martyr of the Homeland
- Artan Jazxhi (born 2001), Albanian footballer
- Artan Karapici (born 1980), Albanian footballer
- Artan Latifi (born 1983), Kosovan footballer and coach
- Artan Mehmeti, Kosovan basketball player
- Artan Mërgjyshi (born 1968), Albanian footballer and coach
- Artan Pali (born 1973), Albanian footballer
- Artan Sakaj (born 1980), Albanian footballer and manager
- Artan Vila (born 1970), Albanian footballer
