= Artanes =

Artanes may refer to:

- Artanes (Bithynia), a town of ancient Bithynia
- Ancient city of Artanes, modern Lom, Bulgaria
- Artanes (son of Hystaspes), ancient Persian prince and brother to Darius the Great
- Artanes dynasty, a dynasty of the ancient Kingdom of Sophene

== See also ==
- Artane (disambiguation)
