= Artane =

Artane may refer to:

- Artane, Dublin, a suburb of Dublin, Ireland
  - Artane Industrial School, a former industrial school
  - Artane Band, a marching band
  - Dublin Artane, a former Dáil constituency
- Trihexyphenidyl, a drug used to treat Parkinson's disease with a brand-name Artane
- Artanë, a town and municipality in Kosovo
- Artane Rizvanolli (born 1984), economy minister of Kosovo

== See also ==
- Artana (disambiguation)
- Artanes (disambiguation)
