= Jim Raynor =

StarCraft character

- StarCraft character
- Concept art of Jim Raynor for StarCraft II
- First appearance: StarCraft (1998)
- Created by: Chris Metzen and James Phinney
- Designed by: Chris Metzen
- Voiced by: Robert Clotworthy

In-universe information
- Species: Terran
- Gender: Male
- Occupation: Marshal; rebel commander
- Affiliation: Raynor's Raiders

James "Jim" Eugene Raynor is a fictional character in Blizzard Entertainment's science fiction StarCraft series. A Terran in his thirties, Raynor is a former soldier and outlaw who eventually becomes a marshal in a backwater colony world. A prominent character in the science fiction real-time strategy video games StarCraft and Brood War, Raynor joins Arcturus Mengsk's revolution against the oppressive Terran Confederacy but becomes disillusioned with Mengsk's genocidal tactics, forming his own paramilitary group to challenge Mengsk's tyranny. For the sequel StarCraft II, Raynor is framed as the viewpoint character of its Terran campaign Wings of Liberty; his opposition to Mengsk and his attachment to his former cohort Sarah Kerrigan serves as the main emotional throughline of StarCraft II. He also appears as a playable character in the crossover multiplayer online battle arena game Heroes of the Storm. Outside video games, Raynor appears in the novels Liberty's Crusade and Queen of Blades, while his backstory is explored in the novels Heaven's Devils and Devil's Due.

Created by Chris Metzen and James Phinney, Raynor is loosely based on a character of the same name in the 1991 film Rush. Metzen conceived Raynor to represent the ordinary man in a series populated with politically motivated characters. Raynor's physical appearance was designed by Metzen himself. During the development of StarCraft II, Blizzard described Wings of Liberty as being structured around Raynor's story, with production director Chris Sigaty saying that the team needed a full campaign to tell "the Jim Raynor story" in the way it wanted. Robert Clotworthy voices the character in all video game appearances.

Reception to Raynor has been generally positive, with commentary emphasizing his persistence, loyalty, and willingness to keep fighting despite repeated betrayal and loss. Some critics were less enthusiastic, regarding him as a comparatively conventional heroic lead.

== Development ==
Raynor was created by Chris Metzen and James Phinney for the original StarCraft. His depiction as a rough-living and dangerous human character was developed through concept art by Metzen. Robert Clotworthy, who voices Raynor in English, said that one piece of concept art showing Raynor on a hoverbike with futuristic weaponry helped shape his performance, giving him the impression that Raynor was someone other characters would listen to without needing him to raise his voice.

Raynor is generally portrayed as a rugged and morally driven protagonist in the series. Metzen has described Raynor as loosely based on a character of the same name from the 1991 film Rush, whom he characterized as a "gritty, undercover cop". Metzen also described Raynor as one of his personal favorite characters, noting that although Raynor is an ordinary man, he interacts with many of the most powerful figures in the series.

During the development of StarCraft II, Blizzard increasingly positioned Raynor as the emotional and narrative center of Wings of Liberty. In a 2010 interview, production director Chris Sigaty said Blizzard split StarCraft II into three installments in part because telling "the Jim Raynor story" in the way the team wanted already required a full campaign. Sigaty said the studio wanted players to be more immersed in the single-player experience and to have more room to explore, build armies, and make choices than a shorter campaign would have allowed.

Lead designer Dustin Browder similarly said the Terran campaign was expanded so players could experience "Jim Raynor's battle across the stars", including his conflict with Arcturus Mengsk and his relationship with Sarah Kerrigan, in greater depth. Browder described this approach as part of Blizzard's effort to create a stronger campaign experience that brought players closer to the characters and treated storytelling in the StarCraft universe more cinematically than the original game.

The canceled tactical shooter StarCraft: Ghost was also expected to feature Raynor in some capacity, as Clotworthy said he had been brought in to voice the character for the game. However, Bill Roper stated in a 2002 interview that the game would not center on either Raynor or Kerrigan.

== Appearances ==
=== In video games ===
Raynor's first major appearance is in 1998's StarCraft, where he is introduced as a marshal on the Terran Confederate frontier world of Mar Sara during an incursion by the extraterrestrial insectoid species known as the Zerg. After becoming disillusioned with the Confederacy's complacency in dealing with the threat, he is recruited by Arcturus Mengsk, the leader of a major rebel faction fighting the Confederacy, and befriends his second-in-command Sarah Kerrigan. After Mengsk defeats the Terran Confederacy and declares himself Emperor of the Terran Dominion, Raynor defects and becomes an independent rebel leader opposing Mengsk's imperial forces, as well as the Zerg Swarm which had captured Kerrigan during the fall of the Confederate capital world of Tarsonis. He later becomes an ally of a Protoss dissident faction led by Tassadar, Fenix and Zeratul; he aids them in their struggle against the Conclave-led Protoss government and the Zerg invasion of Aiur.

In StarCraft: Brood War, Raynor assists the Protoss in their evacuation of a Zerg-infested Aiur and exodus to the Dark Templar homeworld of Shakuras. He later enters into an uneasy alliance with Mengsk and a now-mutated Kerrigan against the United Earth Directorate, only for that alliance to collapse when Kerrigan turns on her former allies.

Raynor's largest role is in StarCraft II: Wings of Liberty, where he serves as the central viewpoint character of the Terran campaign. Past events include Mengsk's use of psi-emitters on Tarsonis to lure the Zerg, his abandonment of Kerrigan, and Raynor's failure to save her becomes central to his characterisation as a broken and embittered figure who is drawn back into the conflict by Zeratul. The story of Wings of Liberty follows him as he leads his rebel group Raynor's Raiders against Mengsk's Dominion while pursuing Xel'Naga artifacts that may be able to restore Kerrigan's humanity.

Raynor continues to play a major role in StarCraft II: Heart of the Swarm and StarCraft II: Legacy of the Void. He also appears in other Blizzard games, including Heroes of the Storm, where he is a playable hero, and Hearthstone, where he appears in the Heroes of StarCraft mini-set.

=== In other media and marketing ===
Raynor also appears in several licensed StarCraft novels, including Liberty's Crusade, Queen of Blades, Heaven's Devils, and Devil's Due, which expand on his background and pre-series history.

Raynor was used prominently in the marketing campaign for StarCraft II, with CNET reporting that Korean Air placed StarCraft II artwork, including Raynor imagery, on two of its aircraft.

== Reception and analysis ==
Reception to Jim Raynor has generally been positive, though not uniformly so. Gaming's Edge described Raynor's depiction in the original StarCraft as an "almost prototypical action movie figure" with a "healthy dose of arrogance", while arguing that his repeated losses and betrayals made his persistence admirable. In a review of the original StarCraft, Peter Olafson of GamePro praised the game's character writing and said he became emotionally invested in Raynor's situation, asking when players had last been able to say that about a strategy-game character. A GameSpot reader poll ranked Raynor among the top ten heroes in video games, praising his humanity, resilience, and development from frontier marshal to galactic hero. GameSpot also praised Robert Clotworthy's voice acting as part of the character's appeal.

Much of the later critical discussion around Raynor focused on his depiction in Wings of Liberty. Writing for Wired in 2008, Earnest Cavalli described StarCraft II's between-mission scenes centered on Raynor, particularly his barroom interludes, as evidence of Blizzard's "new-found focus on immersive storytelling" in the series. Writing for Kotaku, Michael McWhertor wrote that revisiting "the heroic Terran marshal Jim Raynor" was one of the campaign's main attractions and said the story "does not disappoint", particularly praising the dialogue aboard the Hyperion for helping flesh out Raynor's crew and the wider cast. Cavalli described the game's barroom interludes featuring Raynor as evidence of Blizzard's increased emphasis on immersive storytelling. Tom Cross argued that the use of Raynor's bar and later the Hyperion as between-mission hubs gave supporting characters more texture and developed their relationships with Raynor, though he also suggested that these narrative spaces could make the campaign feel structurally unwieldy. On the other hand, Dan Stapleton from PC Gamer found Wings of Liberty's story to be the game's weak point and argued that Raynor was "only barely interesting enough to carry" it, criticizing the character as an overly familiar gruff-hero type when compared with more distinctive characters in the cast.

Raynor has remained a popular character after the release of StarCraft II. GamesRadar+ ranked him among the most notable video-game protagonists in the industry, while Complex included him in a list of video-game soldiers. Raynor was nominated for Most Compelling Character at the second annual Inside Gaming Awards in 2010, losing to John Marston from the Red Dead series.

In a 2021 article in Games and Culture, Gregory Blomquist argued that Wings of Liberty frames Raynor as a would-be rescuer figure in Kerrigan's narrative, reading the campaign as a conventional "white knight" story built around his attempt to restore her humanity. Blomquist's analysis treats Raynor as part of the game's gendered narrative structure, where the player's campaign is organized from Raynor's perspective, which involves reversing Kerrigan's transformation and returning her to a human form.
