= 20th Daytime Emmy Awards =

- Date: May 26, 1993
- Location: Marriott Marquis Hotel, New York City
- Presented by: National Academy of Television Arts and Sciences
- Hosted by: Susan Lucci; Walt Willey

Highlights
- Outstanding Drama Series: The Young and the Restless
- Outstanding Game Show: Jeopardy!

Television/radio coverage
- Network: ABC

The 20th Daytime Emmy Awards were held on May 26, 1993, hosted by All My Children stars Susan Lucci and Walt Willey.

== Outstanding Drama Series ==
- All My Children
- As the World Turns
- Guiding Light
- The Young and the Restless

== Outstanding Lead Actor ==
- Peter Bergman (Jack Abbott, The Young and the Restless)
- David Canary (Adam Chandler & Stuart Chandler, All My Children)
- Mark Derwin (A.C. Mallet, Guiding Light)
- A Martinez (Cruz Castillo, Santa Barbara)
- Robert S. Woods (Bo Buchanan, One Life to Live)
- Michael Zaslow (Roger Thorpe, Guiding Light)

== Outstanding Lead Actress ==
- Julia Barr (Brooke English, All My Children)
- Linda Dano (Felicia Gallant, Another World)
- Ellen Dolan (Margo Hughes, As the World Turns)
- Maeve Kinkead (Vanessa Chamberlain, Guiding Light)
- Susan Lucci (Erica Kane, All My Children)

== Outstanding Supporting Actor ==
- Gerald Anthony (Marco Dane, General Hospital)
- Thom Christopher (Mortimer Bern, One Life to Live)
- Rick Hearst (Alan-Michael Spaulding, Guiding Light)
- Charles Keating (Carl Hutchins, Another World)
- Kin Shriner (Scott Baldwin, General Hospital)

== Outstanding Supporting Actress ==
- Kimberlin Brown (Sheila Carter, The Bold and the Beautiful)
- Jane Elliot (Tracy Quartermaine, General Hospital)
- Jill Larson (Opal Cortlandt, All My Children)
- Ellen Parker (Maureen Reardon Bauer, Guiding Light)
- Tonja Walker (Alex Olanov, One Life to Live)

== Outstanding Younger Actor ==
- Matt Borlenghi (Brian Bodine, All My Children)
- Bryan Buffington (Bill Lewis, Guiding Light)
- Monti Sharp (David Grant, Guiding Light)
- Kristoff St. John (Neil Winters, The Young and the Restless)
- Dondre Whitfield (Terrence Frye, All My Children)

== Outstanding Younger Actress ==
- Beth Ehlers (Harley Cooper, Guiding Light)
- Melissa Hayden (Bridget Reardon, Guiding Light)
- Sydney Penny (B. J. Walker, Santa Barbara)
- Kelly Ripa (Hayley Vaughan, All My Children)
- Heather Tom (Victoria Newman, The Young and the Restless)

== Outstanding Drama Series Writing Team ==
- All My Children: Agnes Nixon; Megan McTavish; Richard Culliton; Hal Corley; Carolyn Culliton; Elizabeth Smith; Karen Lewis; Kathleen Klein; Michelle Patrick; Jeff Beldner; Judith Donato; Susan Kirshenbaum
- As the World Turns: Douglas Marland; Richard Backus; Nancy Ford; Juliet Law Packer; Meredith Post; John Kuntz; Don Chastain; Patti Dizanzo; Caroline Franz; Penelope Koechl; Stephanie Braxton
- Guiding Light: Nancy Curlee; Stephen Demorest; Lorraine Broderick; James E. Reilly; Nancy Williams Watt; Michael Conforti; Bill Elverman; Barbara Esensten; James Harmon Brown; Trent Jones; N. Gail Lawrence; Pete T. Rich; Sally Mandel; Patrick Mulcahey; Roger Newman; Dorothy Ann Purser; Peggy Schibi; Courtney Sherman; Wisner Washam
- The Young and the Restless: William J. Bell; Kay Alden; Jerry Birn; John F. Smith; Rex Best; Janice Ferri Esser; Eric Freiwald; James Houghton; Frederick Johnson

== Outstanding Drama Series Directing Team ==
- All My Children: Jack Coffey; Christopher Goutman; Henry Kaplan; Conal O'Brien; Barbara M. Simmons; Shirley Simmons
- Another World: Casey Childs; Michael Eilbaum; Bob Schwarz; Susan Strickler; Janet Andrews; Mary Madeiras; Carol Sedwick
- As the World Turns: Paul Lammers; Maria Wagner; Charles C. Dyer; Larry Carpenter; Joel Aronowitz; Michael Kerner
- Days of Our Lives: Susan Orlikoff Simon; Stephen Wyman; Herb Stein; Sheryl Harmon; Roger Inman
- Guiding Light: Bruce S. Barry; JoAnne Sedwick; Irene M. Pace; Brain Mertes; John O'Connell; Matthew Lagle; Scott Riggs; Lisa Connor
- The Young and the Restless: Mike Denney; Heather Hill; Frank Pacelli; Randy Robbins; Kathryn Foster; Betty Rothenberg; Dan Brumett

== Outstanding Game Show ==
- Jeopardy! (Merv Griffin Enterprises/KingWorld)
- Family Feud Challenge (Mark Goodson Productions/All American Television/CBS)
- The Price Is Right (Mark Goodson Productions/All American Television/CBS)
- Wheel of Fortune (Merv Griffin Enterprises/KingWorld)

== Outstanding Game Show Host ==
- Pat Sajak (Wheel of Fortune)
- Bob Barker (The Price Is Right)
- Ray Combs (Family Feud)
- Alex Trebek (Jeopardy!)

== Outstanding Writing in an Animated Program ==
- Michael Reaves, Sean Catherine Derek, Martin Pasko, and Paul Dini (Batman: The Animated Series)
- Deanna Oliver, Peter Hastings, Paul Dini, Tom Ruegger, Nicholas Hollander, and Sherri Stoner (Tiny Toon Adventures)
- Steve Viksten, Peter Gaffney, Jonathan Greenberg, Joe Ansolabehere, Michael Ferris, Holly Huckins, and Paul Germain (Rugrats)
- Bruce Talkington, and Karl Geurs (Goof Troop)
- Laraine Arkow, Jeremy Cushner, Shari Goodhartz, Alan Katz, Kevin Rafferty, Dev Ross, Robert Schechter, Gary Sperling, Tom Minton, Ralph Sanchez, and Kevin Hopps (Raw Toonage)

== Outstanding Music Direction and Composition ==
- Steven Bramson (Tiny Toon Adventures - "The Horror of Slumber Party Mountain")
- Harvey Cohen (Batman: The Animated Series - "Cat Scratch Fever")
- Mark Watters and Stephen James Taylor (Raw Toonage)
- Mark Watters (Goof Troop Christmas)
- Shirley Walker (Batman: The Animated Series - "Feat of Clay, Part 2")

== Outstanding Film Sound Mixing ==
- Ray Leonard and Paca Thomas (Back to the Future: The Animated Series)
- Rex Recker, Paul Cote and Jeff Pullman (Square One Television)
- Timothy J. Garrity and Timothy Borquez (Goof Troop)
- Timothy Borquez (The Little Mermaid)
- William Freesh, Robert L. Harman and Patrick Cyccone Jr. (Darkwing Duck)

== Outstanding Film Sound Editing ==
- Paca Thomas, Ray Leonard, Marc S. Perlman and Melissa Ellis (Back to the Future: The Animated Series)
- Marshall Crutcher and Philip Perkins (Great Wonders of the World - "Wonders of Nature")
- Tom Jaeger, Rick Freeman, Michael Geisler, Michael Gollom, Sam Horta, John O. Robinson III, Timothy Borquez and Brian F. Mars (The Little Mermaid)
- Rick Hinson, Cecil Broughton, Charlie King, Rich Harrison, Jerry Winicki, Jennifer Harrison, David Lynch and Andrew Rose (Darkwing Duck)
- Robert Hargreaves, Aaron L. King, Bob Lacivita, Matt Thorne, Thomas Milano, Mark Keatts, Jeff M. Sliney, Mike Dickeson and Russell Brower (Batman: The Animated Series)

== Outstanding Children's Animated Program ==
- Tom Ruegger, Frank Paur, Bruce W. Timm, Boyd Kirkland, Alan Burnett, Jean MacCurdy, Kevin Altieri and Eric Radomski (Batman: The Animated Series)
- Tad Stones, Rick Leon, Alan Zaslove, Dale Case, John Kimball and Toby Shelton (Darkwing Duck)
- David Martin, Tony Eastman, Johan Edström, John Paratore, Mary Harrington, Paul Sparagano, Jim Jinkins, Ken Kimmelman, Nicolas Pesquès, Melanie Grisanti, Jack Spillum, David Campbell, Simon Hart, Yvette Kaplan, Philippe Grimond, Christine Martin, Carol Millican and Vanessa Coffey (Doug)
- Arlene Klasky, Jim Duffy, Steven Dean Moore, Mary Harrington, Paul Germain, Vanessa Coffey, Norton Virgien, Charles Swenson, Geraldine Clarke, Howard E. Baker, Gabor Csupo and Dan Thompson (Rugrats)
- Steven Spielberg, Tom Ruegger, Sherri Stoner, Rich Arons, Byron Vaughns, Ken Boyer, Alfred Gimeno and David West (Tiny Toon Adventures)

== Outstanding Children's Series ==
- Reading Rainbow
- Barney & Friends
- Where in the World Is Carmen Sandiego?
- Mister Rogers' Neighborhood
- Sesame Street

== Lifetime achievement award ==
- Douglas Marland
