= 15th Daytime Emmy Awards =

- Date: June 29, 1988
- Location: Waldorf-Astoria Hotel
- Presented by: National Academy of Television Arts and Sciences
- Hosted by: Phil Donahue

Highlights
- Outstanding Drama Series: Santa Barbara
- Outstanding Game Show: The Price Is Right

Television/radio coverage
- Network: CBS

The 15th Daytime Emmy Awards were held on Wednesday, June 29, 1988, to commemorate excellence in daytime programming between March 6, 1987 and March 5, 1988. The ceremony was held at the Waldorf-Astoria Hotel in New York City, and aired on CBS from 3–5 pm, before Guiding Light.

Winners in each category are in bold.

== Outstanding Daytime Drama Series ==
- All My Children
- As the World Turns
- General Hospital
- **Santa Barbara**
- The Young and the Restless

== Outstanding Actor in a Daytime Drama Series ==
- Larry Bryggman (John Dixon, As the World Turns)
- **David Canary** (**Adam Chandler & Stuart Chandler**, All My Children)
- Robert Gentry (Ross Chandler, All My Children)
- A Martinez (Cruz Castillo, Santa Barbara)
- Stephen Nichols (Steve Johnson, Days of Our Lives)

== Outstanding Actress in a Daytime Drama Series ==
- **Helen Gallagher** (**Maeve Ryan**, Ryan's Hope)
- Elizabeth Hubbard (Lucinda Walsh, As the World Turns)
- Susan Lucci (Erica Kane, All My Children)
- Erika Slezak (Victoria Lord, One Life to Live)
- Marcy Walker (Eden Capwell, Santa Barbara)

== Outstanding Supporting Actor in a Daytime Drama Series ==
- Bernard Barrow (Johnny Ryan, Ryan's Hope)
- Nicolas Coster (Lionel Lockridge, Santa Barbara)
- **Justin Deas** (**Keith Timmons, Santa Barbara**)
- Mark LaMura (Mark Dalton, All My Children)
- David Lewis (Edward Quartermaine, General Hospital)

== Outstanding Supporting Actress in a Daytime Drama Series ==
- Lisa Brown (Iva Snyder, As the World Turns)
- Eileen Fulton (Lisa McColl, As the World Turns)
- Maeve Kinkead (Vanessa Chamberlain, Guiding Light)
- Robin Mattson (Gina Blake, Santa Barbara)
- Arleen Sorkin (Calliope Jones, Days of Our Lives)
- **Ellen Wheeler** (**Cindy Parker**, All My Children)

== Outstanding Young Man in a Daytime Drama Series ==
- Scott DeFreitas (Andy Dixon, As the World Turns)
- Andrew Kavovit (Paul Ryan, As the World Turns)
- Ross Kettle (Jeffrey Conrad, Santa Barbara)
- Robert Duncan McNeill (Charlie Brent, All My Children)
- **Billy Warlock (Frankie Brady, Days of Our Lives**)

== Outstanding Ingenue in a Daytime Drama Series ==
- Tichina Arnold (Zena Brown, Ryan's Hope)
- Andrea Evans (Tina Lord, One Life to Live)
- Lauren Holly (Julie Chandler, All My Children)
- **Julianne Moore (Frannie Hughes and Sabrina Hughes, As the World Turns)**
- Robin Wright (Kelly Capwell, Santa Barbara)

== Outstanding Daytime Drama Series Writing ==
- The Judge
- Superior Court
- Santa Barbara
- **All My Children: Agnes Nixon, Lorraine Broderick, Clarice Blackburn; Susan Kirshenbaum; Kathleen Klein; Karen Lewis; Victor Miller; Megan McTavish; Elizabeth Page; Peggy Sloane; Gillian Spencer; Elizabeth Wallace; Wisner Washam; Mary K. Wells; Jack Wood**

== Outstanding Daytime Drama Series Directing ==
- As the World Turns: Paul Lammers; Jill Mitwell; Bob Schwarz; Maria Wagner; Joel Aronowitz; Michael Kerner
- **The Young and the Restless: Rudy Vejar; Frank Pacelli; Heather H. Hill; Randy Robbins; Betty Rothenberg**
- Days of our Lives: Joseph Behar; Susan Orlikoff Simon; Herb Stein; Stephen Wyman; Becky Greenlaw; Gay Linvill; Sheryl Harmon
- One Life to Live: Larry Auerbach; Peter Miner; Gary Bowen; David Pressman; Susan Pomerantz; Lisa S. Hesser; Andrea Giles Rich
- Superior Court: Joseph Behar; Henry Behar; Aviva Jacobs; Christine R. Magarian

== Outstanding Game Show ==
- **The Price Is Right** - A Mark Goodson Production for CBS
- The $25,000 Pyramid - A Bob-Sande Stewart Production for CBS (Syn. by 20th Century Fox)
- Wheel of Fortune - A Merv Griffin Production for NBC (Syn. by KingWorld)
- Win, Lose or Draw - A Kline & Friends Production for NBC (Syn. by Buena Vista)

== Outstanding Game Show Host/Hostess ==
- **Bob Barker** (The Price Is Right)
- Dick Clark (The $25,000 Pyramid)
- Vicki Lawrence (Win, Lose or Draw)
- Alex Trebek (Jeopardy!/Classic Concentration)

== Outstanding Animated Program ==
- **Margaret Loesch, Lee Gunther, Jim Henson, Bob Richardson, John Ahern and Robert Shellhorn (Muppet Babies)**
- Joe Ruby, Ken Spears, Janice Karman, Ross Bagdasarian Jr. and Charles A. Nichols (Alvin and the Chipmunks)
- Paul Bogrow, Buzz Potamkin and Gordon Kent (CBS Storybreak)
- Fred Wolf, Alan Zaslove, Patsy Cameron, Tedd Anasti and Jymn Magon (DuckTales)
- William Hanna, Joseph Barbera, Freddy Monnickendam, Walt Kubiak, Don Jurwich, Ray Patterson, Don Lusk, Paul Sommer, John Kimball, Jay Sarbry, Bob Goe, Glenn Leopold, Alan Burnett, Kevin Hopps, Bill Matheny, Sean Catherine Derek, Ernie Contreras and Reed Robbins (The Smurfs)
