= 42nd Writers Guild of America Awards =

42nd WGA Awards
- Date: March 18, 1990
- Organized by: Writers Guild of America, East and the Writers Guild of America, West

The 42nd Writers Guild of America Awards honored the best television, and film writers of 1989. Winners were announced on March 18, 1990.

== Winners and nominees ==
=== Film ===
Winners are listed first highlighted in boldface.

**Best Screenplay Written Directly for the Screen**: **Crimes and Misdemeanors, Written by Woody Allen**; Dead Poets Society, Written by Tom Schulman; The Fabulous Baker Boys, Written by Steve Kloves; Sex, Lies, and Videotape, Written by Steven Soderbergh; When Harry Met Sally..., Written by Nora Ephron	**Best Screenplay Based on Material from Another Medium**: **Driving Miss Daisy, Screenplay by Alfred Uhry; based on his play**; Born on the Fourth of July, Screenplay by Ron Kovic and Oliver Stone; based on the book by Ron Kovic; Field of Dreams, Screenplay by Phil Alden Robinson; based on the book by W.P. Kinsella; Glory, Screenplay by Kevin Jarre; based on the book by Lincoln Kistein; My Left Foot: The Story of Christy Brown, Screenplay by Shane Connaughton and Jim Sheridan; based on the novel by Christy Brown

=== Television ===
**Episodic Comedy**: **"Coda" – The Wonder Years (ABC) – Todd W. Langen**; "Please Mr. Postman" – Cheers (NBC) – Brian Pollack, and Mert Rich; "Jumping Jerks" – Cheers (NBC) – Ken Levine, and David Isaacs; "Respect" – Murphy Brown (CBS) – Diane English; "Here's Why You Order from the Spanish Side of the Menu" – The Days and Nights of Molly Dodd (Lifetime) – Eric Ellis Overmyer; "Pottery Will Get You Nowhere" – The Wonder Years (ABC) – Matthew Carlson	**Episodic Drama**: **"Rolling" – TV 101 (CBS) – Karl Schaefer**; "Elysian Fields" – CBS Summer Playhouse (CBS) – Joan Tewkesbury; "X-Mas Chn. Bch. VN, '67" – China Beach (ABC) – John Wells; "Where the Boys Are" – China Beach (ABC) – Alan Brennert; "His Suits Is Hirsute" – L.A. Law (NBC) – Steven Bochco, David E. Kelley, Michele Gallery, and William M. Finkelstein; "The Measure of a Man" – Star Trek: The Next Generation (Syndicated) – Melinda M. Snodgrass
**Daytime Serials**: **Ryan's Hope (ABC) – Claire Labine, Matthew Labine, Eleanor Mancusi, William Burritt, Louise Shaffer, Paul Balido**; All My Children (ABC) – Agnes Nixon, Margaret DePriest, Lorraine Broderick, Victor Miller, Peggy Sloane, Megan McTavish, Gillian Spencer, Mary K. Wells, Susan Kirshenbaum, Elizabeth Page, Karen Lewis, Elizabeth Wallace, Kathleen Klein; As the World Turns (CBS) – Douglas Marland, John Kuntz, Stephanie Braxton, Juliet Law Packer, Meredith Post, Nancy Ford, Penelope Koechl, Richard Backus, Caroline Franz, Patricia Dizenzo	**Anthology Episode/Single Program**: **Tales from the Hollywood Hills: Closed Set (PBS) – Ellen M. Violett**; "The Birth" – The Cosby Show (NBC) – John Markus, Carmen Finestra, and Gary Kott; "Father & Son Game" – The Twilight Zone (CBS) – Jeremy Bertrand Finch, and Paul Chitlik; "Street of Shadows" – The Twilight Zone (CBS) – Michael Reaves
**Original Long Form**: **Nightbreaker (TNT) – T.S. Cook**	**Adapted Long Form**: **Part 1" – Lonesome Dove (CBS) – William D. Wittliff**
**Children's Script**: **"Takind a Stand" – ABC Afterschool Special – Bruce Harmon**; "No Means No" – CBS Schoolbreak Special (CBS) – Jeffrey Auerbach; "A Matter of Conscience" – CBS Schoolbreak Special (CBS) – Paul W. Cooper; "My Past Is My Own" – CBS Schoolbreak Special (CBS) – Alan L. Gansberg; Big Bird in Japan" – Sesame Street (PBS) – Jon Stone	**Variety – Musical**: **Not Necessarily the News (HBO) – Nancy Harris, Larry Arnstein, Steve Barker, Joe Guppy, Matt Neuman, Duncan Scott McGibbon, Jon Ross, Lane Sarasohn, Steve Young, Merrill Markoe, Tom Kramer, Peter Ocko**
**Comedy/Variety – Musical, Awards, Tributes – Specials**: **The Earth Day Special (ABC) – Steve Tamerius**

==== Documentary ====
**Documentary – Current Events**: **Secret Intelligence (PBS) – Joseph Angier, and Blaine Baggett**	**Documentary – Other than Current Events**: **Mr. Sears' Catalogue – Edward Gray, and Mark Obenhaus**

=== Special awards ===
Laurel Award for Screenwriting Achievement
**Donald Ogden Stewart**
Laurel Award for TV Writing Achievement
**David Shaw**
Valentine Davies Award
**John Furia**
Morgan Cox Award
**Oscar Saul**
Paul Selvin Award
**Alison Cross**
