= Edward J. Scott =

American soap opera producer (born 1944)

- Born: Edward James Scott; September 15, 1944 (age 82); Santa Monica, California, U.S.
- Occupation: Producer
- Years active: 1976–2025
- Spouse: Melody Thomas Scott (m. 1985)
- Children: 3

Edward James Scott (born September 15, 1944) is an American soap opera producer. Born and raised in Santa Monica, California, Scott earned a Bachelor of Arts from California State University at Northridge with a double major of anthropology and broadcasting journalism.

== Career ==
Scott is a five-time Emmy Award-winning executive producer and is partnered with producer/writer Brendan Burns in the film and television production company Scott/Burns. Scott received a nomination for the Daytime Emmy Award for Outstanding Drama Series as executive producer of the NBC daytime drama Days of Our Lives in 2009.

Formerly executive producer of the CBS television daytime drama, The Young and the Restless for over 25 years, Scott was executive producer of the show during its reign of over 20 years and over 1,000 weeks as the #1 American daytime television drama (according to Nielsen). During this period, CBS television also secured the #1 ranking in its time slot, a record it held for more than two decades (according to Nielsen).

Scott had a 25-year producing partnership and creative collaboration with William J. Bell and Lee Phillip Bell (the co-creators of The Young and the Restless and The Bold and the Beautiful), the two most popular daily American television series worldwide. Both daytime dramas are syndicated internationally to a combined total of over 125 markets worldwide, with a combined daily viewing audience in excess of 100 million viewers on six continents.

During Scott's tenure as executive producer of The Young and the Restless, the series received five Daytime Emmy Awards for Outstanding Drama Series, accumulating more Emmy nominations in that category and in all other categories than any other drama series in the history of the National Academy of Television Arts and Sciences. In 2000 alone, the series received 28 Emmy Award nominations, a record for both American primetime and daytime television, an accomplishment acknowledged by the Guinness Book of World Records. Scott received a total of 5 Emmy Awards (2007, 1993, 1986, 1985, 1983) and 14 Emmy nominations for Outstanding Daytime Drama for The Young and the Restless.

Under Scott's leadership, the show also received a People's Choice Awards, TV Guide Reader's Poll, and more NAACP Image Awards for Outstanding Daytime Drama than any other American television series, primetime or daytime. On October 9, 2024, it was announced he would return to The Young and the Restless as a senior producer. The following year, Scott retired, receiving his final episodic credit on June 4.

== Upcoming Projects ==
Scott is in a producing partnership with producer/screenwriter Brendan Burns on the following film and television projects:

- Covert: My Years Infiltrating the Mob by NBA referee Bob Delaney; partnered with Larry Spiegal and Judy Goldstein, producers.;
- Cast No Shadows, by Mary S. Lovell. The spellbinding true story of Betty Pack, American debutante-turned-spy who, with seductive ingenuity became a legendary super spy. Betty Pack literally changed the course of WWII.
- Freshwater Road, as the award-winning novel by Denise Nicholas about a young woman’s coming-of-age during the Freedom Summer of 1964, hailed by the Washington Post as “The best work of fiction on the Civil Rights Movements since The Autobiography of Miss Jane Pittman.” partnered with Denise Nicholas and Frank Tobin.
- Hidden Valor: The Women of the SOE, an event WW II miniseries, from a story and treatment by Burns, based upon the exploits of Nancy Wake, the most decorated woman in World War II and five other extraordinary women. These women were trained in weapons, explosives, sabotage and silent killing, all possessing, as their commander put it, “essential guts.”
- Flawless (2007): a provocative contemporary noir thriller in the tradition of Body Heat and Unfaithful. Screenplay by Burns.

== Personal life ==
Scott has been married since 1985 to actress Melody Thomas Scott, who is recognized for her role as Nikki Newman on The Young and the Restless. The couple have three daughters: Jennifer, Alexandra, and Elizabeth. They renewed their wedding vows on their 20th wedding anniversary in an Entertainment Tonight special.

== Positions held ==
The Young and the Restless (CBS)

- Associate producer ( August 20, 1976– September 15, 1978)
- Producer ( September 18, 1978– December 11, 1986)
- Executive producer ( November 16, 1987– January 11, 2002)
- Supervising producer ( December 12, 1986- November 13, 1987, January 12, 2004 – June 15, 2007)
- Senior producer (November 4, 2024 – June 4, 2025)

Days of Our Lives (NBC)

- Executive consultant (July 25, 2007 – August 29, 2007)
- Co-Executive producer (August 30, 2007 to September 16, 2008)

The Bold and the Beautiful (CBS)

- Producer (September 13, 2010– October 4, 2011)
- Supervising producer ( October 5, 2011– September 13, 2024)

== Awards and nominations ==
Edward J. Scott has been nominated and won numerous Daytime Emmy Awards and Producers Guild of America Awards.

| Year | Award | Category | Work | Result | Ref. |
|---|---|---|---|---|---|
| 1979 | Daytime Emmy Awards | Outstanding Drama Series | The Young and the Restless | Nominated | |
| 1983 | Daytime Emmy Awards | Outstanding Drama Series | The Young and the Restless | Won | |
| 1985 | Daytime Emmy Awards | Outstanding Drama Series | The Young and the Restless | Won | |
| 1986 | Daytime Emmy Awards | Outstanding Drama Series | The Young and the Restless | Won | |
| 1987 | Daytime Emmy Awards | Outstanding Drama Series | The Young and the Restless | Nominated | |
| 1988 | Daytime Emmy Awards | Outstanding Drama Series | The Young and the Restless | Nominated | |
| 1989 | Daytime Emmy Awards | Outstanding Drama Series | The Young and the Restless | Nominated | |
| 1990 | Daytime Emmy Awards | Outstanding Drama Series | The Young and the Restless | Nominated | |
| 1991 | Daytime Emmy Awards | Outstanding Drama Series | The Young and the Restless | Nominated | |
| 1992 | Daytime Emmy Awards | Outstanding Drama Series | The Young and the Restless | Nominated | |
| 1993 | Daytime Emmy Awards | Outstanding Drama Series | The Young and the Restless | Won | |
| 1994 | Daytime Emmy Awards | Outstanding Drama Series | The Young and the Restless | Nominated | |
| 1995 | Daytime Emmy Awards | Outstanding Drama Series | The Young and the Restless | Nominated | |
| 1996 | Daytime Emmy Awards | Outstanding Drama Series | The Young and the Restless | Nominated | |
| 1997 | Daytime Emmy Awards | Outstanding Drama Series | The Young and the Restless | Nominated | |
| 1998 | Daytime Emmy Awards | Outstanding Drama Series | The Young and the Restless | Nominated | |
| 1999 | Daytime Emmy Awards | Outstanding Drama Series | The Young and the Restless | Nominated | |
| 2000 | Daytime Emmy Awards | Outstanding Drama Series | The Young and the Restless | Nominated | |
| 2001 | Daytime Emmy Awards | Outstanding Drama Series | The Young and the Restless | Nominated | |
| 2002 | Daytime Emmy Awards | Outstanding Drama Series | The Young and the Restless | Nominated | |
| 2005 | Daytime Emmy Awards | Outstanding Drama Series | The Young and the Restless | Nominated | |
| 2006 | Daytime Emmy Awards | Outstanding Drama Series | The Young and the Restless | Nominated | |
| 2007 | Daytime Emmy Awards | Outstanding Drama Series | The Young and the Restless | Won (Note: Tied with Guiding Light.) | |
| 2008 | Daytime Emmy Awards | Outstanding Drama Series | The Young and the Restless | Nominated | |
| 2009 | Daytime Emmy Awards | Outstanding Drama Series | Days of Our Lives | Nominated | |
| 2011 | Daytime Emmy Awards | Outstanding Drama Series | The Bold and the Beautiful | Won | |
| 2013 | Daytime Emmy Awards | Outstanding Drama Series | The Bold and the Beautiful | Nominated | |
| 2013 | Daytime Emmy Awards | Outstanding Drama Series | The Bold and the Beautiful | Nominated | |
| 2014 | Daytime Emmy Awards | Outstanding Drama Series | The Bold and the Beautiful | Nominated | |
| 2015 | Daytime Emmy Awards | Outstanding Drama Series | The Bold and the Beautiful | Nominated | |
| 2016 | Daytime Emmy Awards | Outstanding Drama Series | The Bold and the Beautiful | Nominated | |
| 2017 | Daytime Emmy Awards | Outstanding Drama Series | The Bold and the Beautiful | Nominated | |
| 2018 | Daytime Emmy Awards | Outstanding Drama Series | The Bold and the Beautiful | Nominated | |
| 2019 | Daytime Emmy Awards | Outstanding Drama Series | The Bold and the Beautiful | Nominated | |
| 2020 | Daytime Emmy Awards | Outstanding Drama Series | The Bold and the Beautiful | Nominated | |
| 2021 | Daytime Emmy Awards | Outstanding Drama Series | The Bold and the Beautiful | Nominated | |
| 2022 | Daytime Emmy Awards | Outstanding Drama Series | The Bold and the Beautiful | Nominated | |
| 2023 | Daytime Emmy Awards | Outstanding Drama Series | The Bold and the Beautiful | Nominated | |
| 2024 | Daytime Emmy Awards | Outstanding Drama Series | The Bold and the Beautiful | Nominated | |
| 2025 | Daytime Emmy Awards | Outstanding Drama Series | The Young and the Restless | Nominated | |
| 2026 | Daytime Emmy Awards | Outstanding Drama Series | The Young and the Restless | Nominated | |

== Executive Producing Tenure ==
| Preceded by William J. Bell; H. Wesley Kenney | Executive Producer of The Young and the Restless (with William J. Bell); November 16, 1987 – January 11, 2002 | Succeeded by William J. Bell; David Shaughnessy |
| Preceded by Ken Corday; Stephen Wyman | Executive Producer of Days of Our Lives (with Ken Corday); August 30, 2007 – September 16, 2008 | Succeeded by Ken Corday; Gary Tomlin |
