= 7th Daytime Emmy Awards =

- Date: Wednesday, June 4, 1980
- Location: Studio 8H, 30 Rockefeller Plaza
- Presented by: National Academy of Television Arts and Sciences
- Hosted by: Ed McMahon and Susan Seaforth Hayes

Highlights
- Outstanding Drama Series: Guiding Light
- Outstanding Game Show: The $20,000 Pyramid and Hollywood Squares (tie)

Television/radio coverage
- Network: NBC

The 7th Daytime Emmy Awards were held in 1980 to commemorate excellence in daytime programming from the previous year (1979). The seventh awards included a cameo appearance category, giving an award to a memorable soap cameo. Six awards were given.

The ceremony was telecast at 2:30 p.m. Wednesday, June 4 on NBC. It preempted Another World, which was a 90-minute program at the time.

Winners in each category are in bold.

== Outstanding Daytime Drama Series ==
- All My Children
- Another World
- **Guiding Light**

== Outstanding Actor in a Daytime Drama Series ==
- James Mitchell (Palmer Cortlandt, All My Children)
- William Mooney (Paul Martin, All My Children)
- **Douglass Watson** (**Mac Cory**, **Another World**)
- Franc Luz (Dr. John Bennett, The Doctors)
- John Gabriel (Dr. Seneca Beaulac, Ryan's Hope)
- Michael Levin (Jack Fenelli, Ryan's Hope)

== Outstanding Actress in a Daytime Drama Series ==
- Julia Barr (Brooke English, All My Children)
- Kathleen Noone (Ellen Dalton, All My Children)
- Beverlee McKinsey (Iris Carrington, Another World)
- Kim Hunter (Nola Madison / Martha Cory), The Edge of Night)
- Leslie Charleson (Dr. Monica Quartermaine, General Hospital)
- **Judith Light** (**Karen Wolek**, **One Life to Live**)

== Outstanding Supporting Actor in a Daytime Drama Series ==
- **Warren Burton** (**Eddie Dorrance**, **All My Children**)
- Julius LaRosa (Renaldo, Another World)
- Vasili Bogazianos (Mickey Dials, The Edge of Night)
- Shepperd Strudwick (Professor Timothy McCauley, Love of Life)
- Ron Hale (Dr. Roger Coleridge, Ryan's Hope)

== Outstanding Supporting Actress in a Daytime Drama Series ==
- **Francesca James** (**Kelly Cole Tyler**, **All My Children**)
- Deidre Hall (Dr. Marlena Evans, Days of Our Lives)
- Lois Kibbee (Geraldine Whitney Saxon, The Edge of Night)
- Elaine Lee (Mildred Trumble, The Doctors)
- Valerie Mahaffey (Ashley Bennett, The Doctors)
- Louise Shaffer (Rae Woodard, Ryan's Hope)

== Outstanding Cameo Appearance in a Daytime Drama Series ==
- Eli Mintz (Locksmith, All My Children)
- **Hugh McPhillips** (**Hugh Pearson**, **Days of our Lives**)
- Kathryn Harrow (Pat Reyerson, The Doctors)
- Sammy Davis Jr. (Chip Warren, One Life to Live)
- Joan Fontaine (Page Williams, Ryan's Hope)

== Outstanding Daytime Drama Series Writing ==
- All My Children: Agnes Nixon; Wisner Washam; Jack Wood; Caroline Franz; Mary K. Wells; Cathy Chicos; Clarice Blackburn; Anita Jaffe; Kenneth Harvey
- One Life to Live: Gordon Russell; Sam Hall; Peggy O'Shea; Don Wallace; Lanie Bertram; Cynthia Benjamin; Marisa Gioffre
- **Ryan's Hope**: Claire Labine; Paul Avila Mayer; Mary Munisteri; Judith Pinsker; Jeffrey Lane
- The Edge of Night: Henry Slesar; Steve Lehrman

== Outstanding Daytime Drama Series Directing ==
- All My Children: Henry Kaplan; Jack Coffey; Sherrell Hoffman; Jørn Winther
- General Hospital: Marlene Laird; Alan Pultz; Phil Sogard
- The Edge of Night: John Sedwick; Richard Pepperman
- **Ryan's Hope**: Lela Swift; Jerry Evans
- Another World: Ira Cirker; Melvin Bernhardt; Robert Calhoun; Barnet Kellman; Jack Hofsiss; Andrew D. Weyman
- Love of Life: Larry Auerbach; Robert Scinto

== Outstanding Game Show ==
- **The Hollywood Squares** – A Heatter-Quigley Production for NBC
- **The $20,000 Pyramid** – A Bob Stewart Production for ABC
- Family Feud – A Mark Goodson-Bill Todman Production for ABC

== Outstanding Game Show Host ==
- **Peter Marshall** (The Hollywood Squares)
- Richard Dawson (Family Feud)
