= 8th Daytime Emmy Awards =

- Date: May 21, 1981
- Location: Grand Hyatt New York
- Presented by: National Academy of Television Arts and Sciences
- Hosted by: Dick Clark

Highlights
- Outstanding Drama Series: General Hospital
- Outstanding Game Show: The $20,000 Pyramid

Television/radio coverage
- Network: ABC

The 8th Daytime Emmy Awards were held on Thursday, May 21, 1981, to commemorate excellence in daytime programming from March 6, 1980 to March 5, 1981. The eighth awards did not include the cameo category from the previous year, so only five awards were given, like in previous years.

The ceremony was telecast from 3 to 4:30 p.m. on ABC, preempting General Hospital and The Edge of Night.

Winners in each category are in bold.

== Outstanding Daytime Drama Series ==
- All My Children
- **General Hospital**
- Ryan's Hope

== Outstanding Actor in a Daytime Drama Series ==
- James Mitchell (Palmer Cortlandt, All My Children)
- **Douglass Watson** (Mac Cory, Another World)
- Larry Bryggman (John Dixon, As the World Turns)
- Henderson Forsythe (David Stewart, As the World Turns)
- Anthony Geary (Luke Spencer, General Hospital)

== Outstanding Actress in a Daytime Drama Series ==
- Julia Barr (Brooke English, All My Children)
- Susan Lucci (Erica Kane, All My Children)
- **Judith Light** (Karen Wolek, One Life to Live)
- Robin Strasser (Dorian Lord, One Life to Live)
- Helen Gallagher (Maeve Ryan, Ryan's Hope)

== Outstanding Supporting Actor in a Daytime Drama Series ==
- Matthew Cowles (Billy Clyde Tuggle, All My Children)
- William Mooney (Paul Martin, All My Children)
- Justin Deas (Tom Hughes, As the World Turns)
- Richard Backus (Barry Ryan, Ryan's Hope)
- **Larry Haines** (Stu Bergman, Search for Tomorrow)

== Outstanding Supporting Actress in a Daytime Drama Series ==
- Elizabeth Lawrence, (Myra Sloane, All My Children)
- Lois Kibbee, (Geraldine Whitney Saxon, The Edge of Night)
- **Jane Elliot** (Tracy Quartermaine, General Hospital)
- Randall Edwards (Delia Ryan, Ryan's Hope)
- Jacklyn Zeman (Bobbie Spencer, General Hospital)

== Outstanding Daytime Drama Series Writing ==
- **Guiding Light: Douglas Marland, Robert Dwywer, Nancy Franklin & Harding Lemay**
- All My Children: Agnes Nixon, Wisner Washam, Jack Wood
- General Hospital
- One Life to Live

== Outstanding Daytime Drama Series Directing ==
- All My Children
- **General Hospital**
- One Life to Live

== Outstanding Game Show ==
- **The $20,000 Pyramid** – A Bob Stewart Production for ABC
- Family Feud – A Mark Goodson-Bill Todman Production for ABC
- The Hollywood Squares – A Heatter-Quigley Production for NBC

== Outstanding Game Show Host ==
- **Peter Marshall** (The Hollywood Squares)
- Dick Clark (The $20,000 Pyramid)
- Richard Dawson (Family Feud)
