= 53rd Daytime Emmy Awards =

- Awarded for: Outstanding achievement in all fields of daytime television
- Presented by: National Academy of Television Arts and Sciences (NATAS)
- Announced on: July 14, 2026
- Date: October 30, 2026
- Site: Hollywood Palladium; Los Angeles, California, U.S.
- Hosted by: Matthew Hoffman
- Produced by: Adam Sharp (NATAS); Lisa Armstrong (NATAS)
- Official website: theemmys.tv/daytime/

Highlights
- Outstanding Drama Series: General Hospital
- Lifetime achievement: Genie Francis
- Most awards: Main: Beyond the Gates (4); General Hospital (4); All: The Kelly Clarkson Show (5)
- Most nominations: The Young and the Restless (18)

Television coverage
- Network: The Emmys App watch.theemmys.tv

The 53rd Daytime Emmy Awards, presented by the National Academy of Television Arts and Sciences (NATAS), took place on October 30, 2026, at the Hollywood Palladium in Los Angeles, California. During the gala, the NATAS presented Daytime Emmys in 14 categories (Note: This count excludes the categories presented from the 53rd Daytime Creative Arts & Lifestyle Emmy Awards during the same evening.) honoring daytime television in 2025. The ceremony was broadcast via the Emmys app and online at watch.theemmys.tv, which began the year prior. For the first time since the 43rd event, no host will present the ceremony. Instead, the "voice of God" Matthew Hoffman presented the ceremony.

The Young and the Restless led nominations, with 18 total. Beyond the Gates and General Hospital won four awards each, with the latter winning Outstanding Drama Series, their sixth consecutive win in the category. In related events, the Academy held its 53rd Daytime Creative Arts & Lifestyle Emmy Awards ceremony on the same evening.

== Winners and nominees ==
The nominees for the 53rd Daytime Emmy Awards were announced on July 14, 2026. Winners are listed first, highlighted in boldface, and indicated with a double dagger (‡).

=== Awards ===
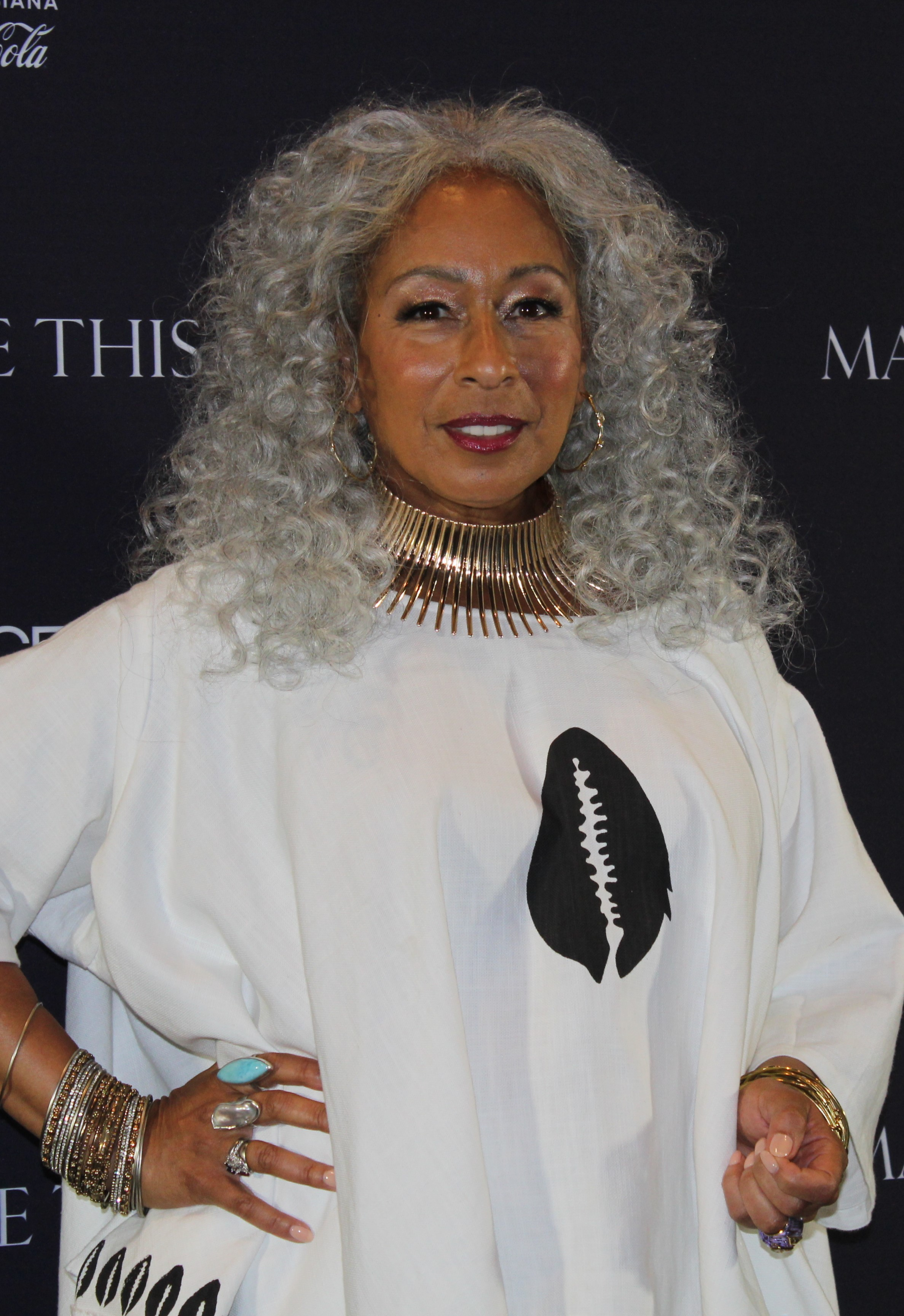
Tamara Tunie, Outstanding Lead Actress in a Drama Series winner

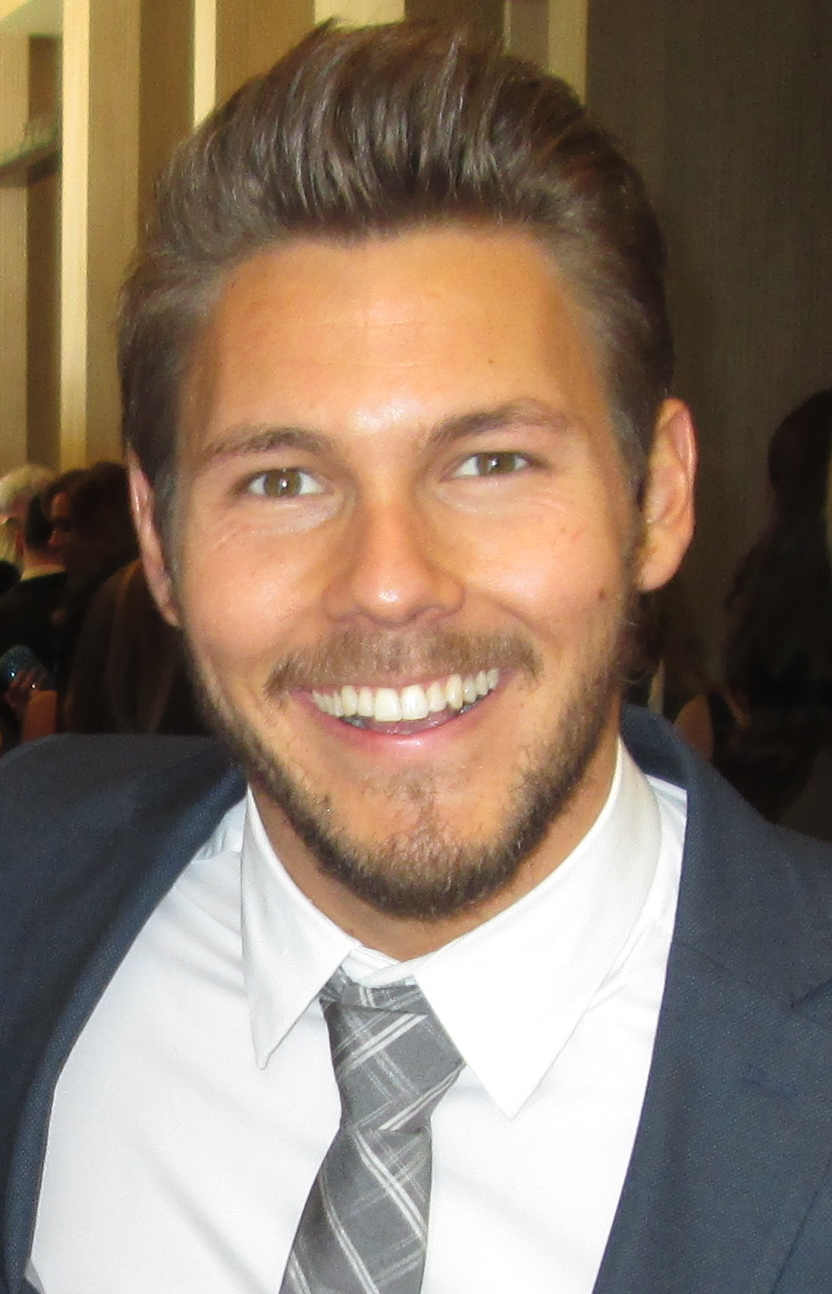
Scott Clifton, Outstanding Lead Actor in a Drama Series winner

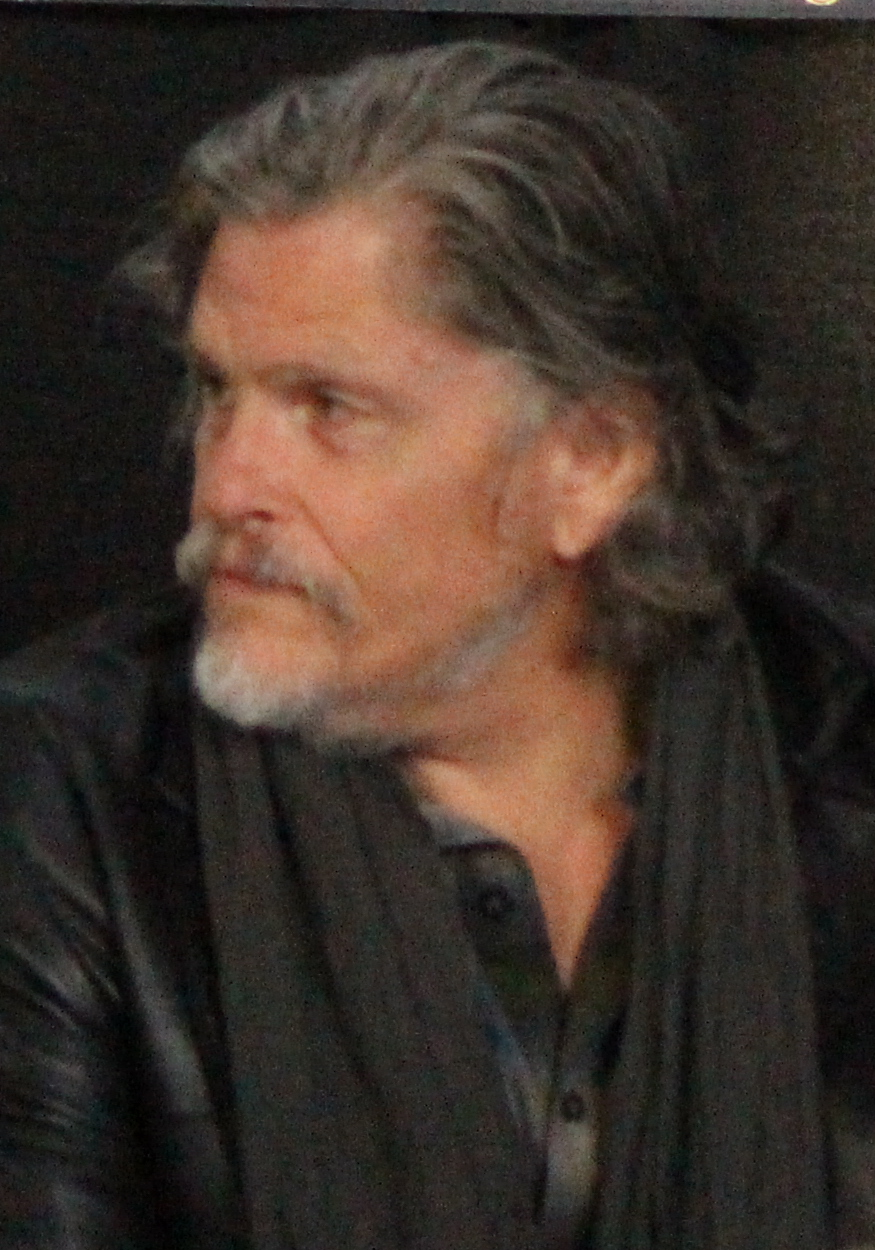
Jeff Kober, Outstanding Guest Performer in a Drama Series winner

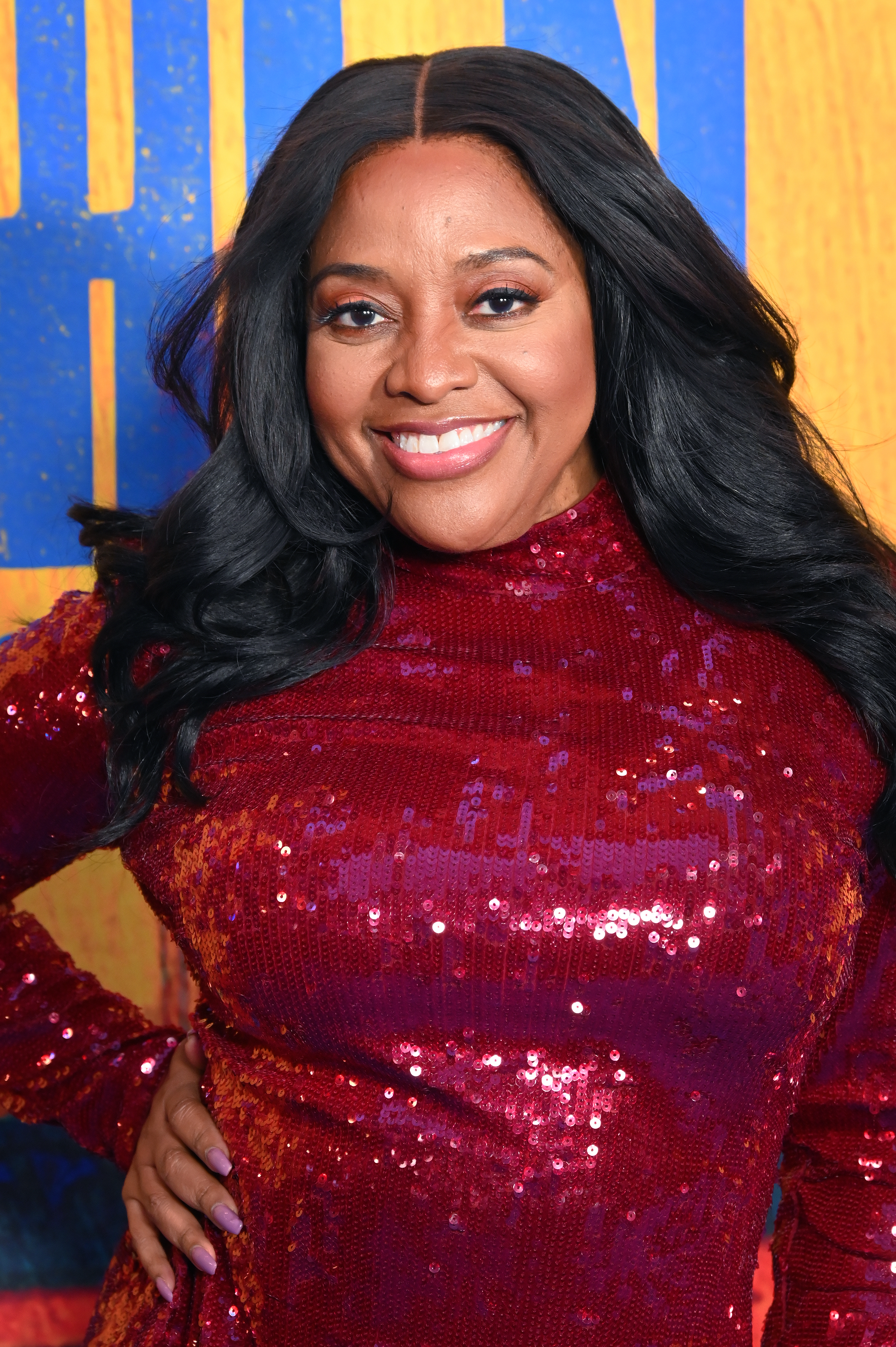
Sherri Shepard, Outstanding Daytime Talk Series Host wnner

Star Jones, Outstanding Daytime Personality – Daily winner

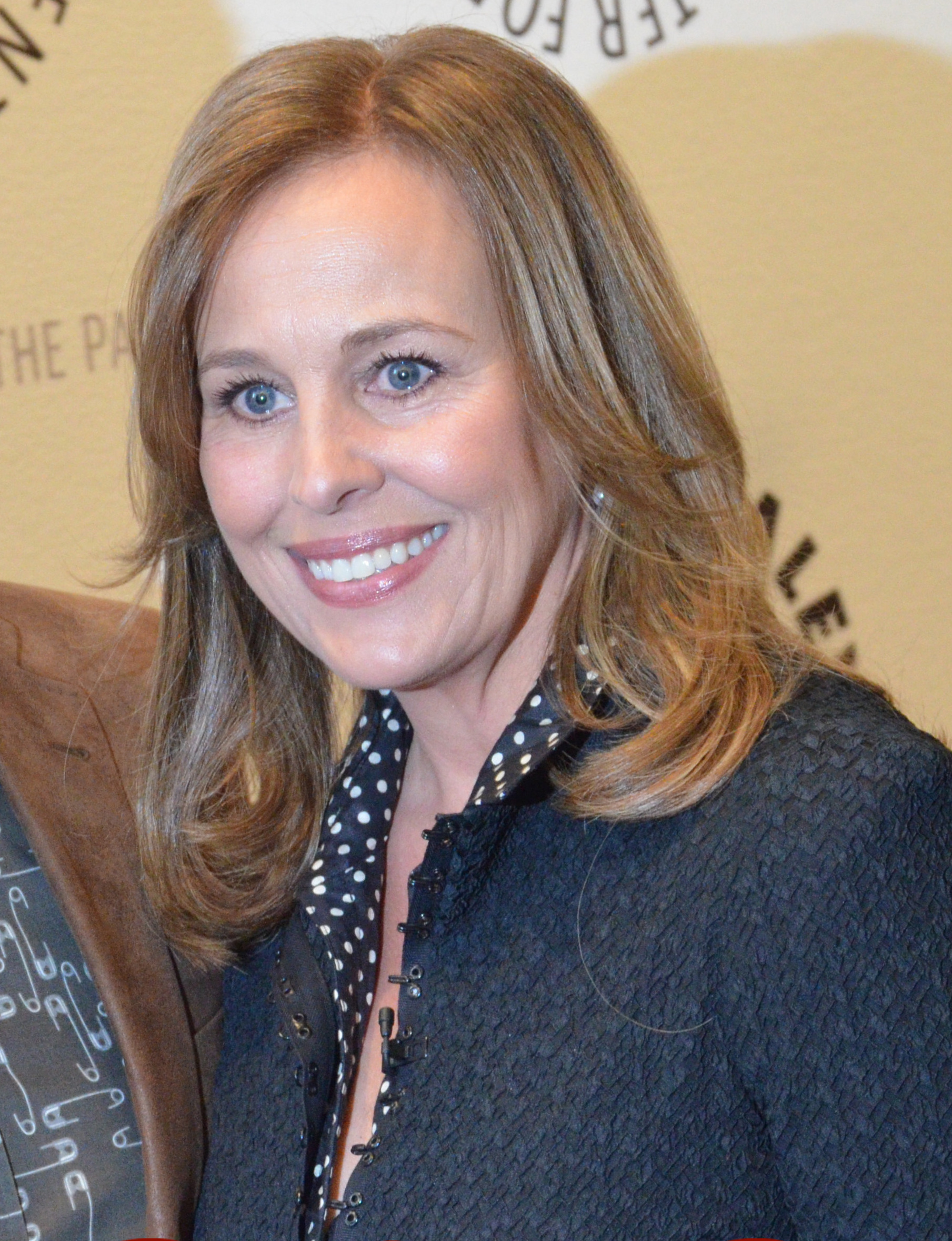
Genie Francis, Lifetime Achieve Award recipient

List of winners and nominees
Category	Winners and nominees
Outstanding Drama Series	**General Hospital** ^{‡}; Beyond the Gates; Days of Our Lives; The Young and the Restless
Outstanding Daytime Talk Series	**The Kelly Clarkson Show** ^{‡}; Today 3rd Hour; The Drew Barrymore Show; Live with Kelly and Mark; Today with Jenna & Friends; The View
Outstanding Entertainment News Series	**Entertainment Tonight** ^{‡}; Access Hollywood; Extra
Outstanding Culinary Instructional Series	**Be My Guest with Ina Garten** ^{‡}; Andrew Zimmern's Wild Game Kitchen; Delicious Miss Brown; Magnolia Table: At the Farm; Pati's Mexican Table
Outstanding Lead Actress in a Drama Series	**Tamara Tunie as Anita Williams Dupree on Beyond the Gates** ^{‡}; Stacy Haiduk as Kristen DiMera on Days of Our Lives; Karla Mosley as Dani Dupree on Beyond the Gates; Michelle Stafford as Phyllis Summers on The Young and the Restless; Heather Tom as Katie Logan on The Bold and the Beautiful
Outstanding Lead Actor in a Drama Series	**Scott Clifton as Liam Spencer on The Bold and the Beautiful** ^{‡}; Eric Braeden as Victor Newman on The Young and the Restless; Steve Burton as Jason Morgan on General Hospital; Thorsten Kaye as Ridge Forrester on The Bold and the Beautiful; Christian LeBlanc as Michael Baldwin on The Young and the Restless
Outstanding Supporting Actress in a Drama Series	**Beth Maitland as Traci Abbott on The Young and the Restless** ^{‡}; Linsey Godfrey as Sarah Horton on Days of Our Lives; Camryn Grimes as Mariah Copeland on The Young and the Restless; Trisha Mann-Grant as Leslie Thomas on Beyond the Gates; Amanda Setton as Brook Lynn Quartermaine on General Hospital
Outstanding Supporting Actor in a Drama Series	**Roger Howarth as Matt Clark on The Young and the Restless** ^{‡}; Sean Dominic as Nate Hastings on The Young and the Restless; Timon Kyle Durrett as Bill Hamilton on Beyond the Gates; Michael Graziadei as Daniel Romalotti on The Young and the Restless; Mike Manning as Bradley "Smitty" Smith on Beyond the Gates; Lawrence Saint-Victor as Carter Walton on The Bold and the Beautiful
Outstanding Emerging Talent in a Drama Series	**Ambyr Michelle as Eva Thomas on Beyond the Gates** ^{‡}; Braedyn Bruner as Emma Scorpio-Drake on General Hospital; Al Calderon as Javi Hernandez on Days of Our Lives; Alice Halsey as Rachel Black on Days of Our Lives; Giovanni Mazza as Gio Palmieri on General Hospital; Arielle Prepetit as Naomi Hamilton Hawthorne on Beyond the Gates
Outstanding Guest Performer in a Drama Series	**Jeff Kober as Cyrus Renault on General Hospital** ^{‡}; Jasmine Burke as June Hughes on Beyond the Gates; Eva LaRue as Natalia Rogers-Ramirez on General Hospital; Christopher Sean as Paul Narita on Days of Our Lives; Ray Wise as Ian Ward on The Young and the Restless
Outstanding Daytime Talk Series Host	**Sherri Shepherd – Sherri** ^{‡}; Joy Behar, Whoopi Goldberg, Alyssa Farah Griffin, Sara Haines, Sunny Hostin, Ana Navarro – The View; Kelly Clarkson – The Kelly Clarkson Show; Tamron Hall – Tamron Hall; Jennifer Hudson – The Jennifer Hudson Show
Outstanding Daytime Personality – Daily	**Star Jones, Corey Jovan – Divorce Court** ^{‡}; Mona Kosar Abdi, Derek Hough, Terri Seymour – Extra; Cassie DiLaura, Denny Directo, Kevin Frazier, Rachel Smith, Nischelle Turner – Entertainment Tonight; Scott Evans, Zuri Hall, Kit Hoover, Mario Lopez – Access Hollywood
Outstanding Writing Team for a Drama Series	**General Hospital** ^{‡}; Beyond the Gates; The Bold and the Beautiful; Days of Our Lives
Outstanding Directing Team for a Drama Series	**Days of Our Lives** ^{‡}; General Hospital; The Young and the Restless

=== Lifetime Achievement Award ===
- Genie Francis – American actress (born 1962)

== Presenters ==
The presenters were announced on October 22, 2026.

- Eva zu Beck
- Danielle Chang
- Crystal Chappell
- Jonathan Frakes – presented the Lifetime Achievement Award
- Sunny Hostin
- Derek Hough
- Pati Jinich
- Star Jones
- Michael Jr.
- Lesli Kay
- Joe Lando
- Eva LaRue
- Katelyn MacMullen
- A Martinez
- Greg Mathis
- Delon de Metz
- Juliet Mills
- Keke Palmer
- James Preston
- Paul Telfer
- Tamara Tunie
- Nischelle Turner
- Susan Walters
- Alicia Leigh Willis
- Andrew Zimmern
