= Mary O'Leary =

Mary O'Leary may refer to:

- Mary O'Leary (producer), American soap opera producer
- Mary O'Leary (camogie), Irish former camogie player
- Mary O'Leary (Big Brother), Irish reality show contestant
- Liz Truss (born 1975), British former Prime Minister, whose birth name was Mary and is married to Hugh O'Leary
