= Elizabeth Wallace =

Elizabeth Wallace may refer to:

- Elizabeth Wallace (writer) (fl. 1980s1990s), American television writer
- Elizabeth Wallace (actress) (died 2011), British actress
- Bess Truman, née Wallace (1885–1982), First Lady of the United States
