= Heather Hill =

Heather Hill is the name of:

- Heather Hill (director) (1939/1940–2025), American television director and producer
- Heather Hill (politician) (born 1960), Australian politician
