= Washam =

Washam is a surname. Notable people with the surname include:

- Ben Washam (1915–1984), American animator
- Jo Ann Washam (1950–2019), American golfer
- Rey Washam (born 1961), American drummer
- Wisner Washam (born 1931), American soap opera writer
