= Hugh McPhillips =

American actor

- Born: March 31, 1920 Suffern, New York, U.S.
- Died: October 31, 1990 (aged 70) Sherman Oaks, California, U.S.
- Occupation: Actor, director
- Years active: 1974–1990
- Notable awards: 7th Daytime Emmy Awards
- Spouse: Rosemary Quigley McPhillips (1950–1990)
- Children: Brian & Michael & Maureen & Anne-Marie
- Relatives: Charlie McPhillips (Brother); Helen McPhillips King (Sister)

Hugh McPhillips (March 31, 1920 – October 31, 1990) was an American actor and director.

== Early life ==
McPhillips was born in Suffern, New York to a Roman Catholic family member of Irish descent, one of three siblings.

== Acting career ==
McPhillips was perhaps best known for winning a Daytime Emmy Award for Outstanding Cameo Appearance in a Drama Series for Days of Our Lives in 1980 as Hugh Pearson. He played Andre, the restaurant host, in The Young and the Restless and also appeared in many soap operas & films in the 1980s.

== Death ==
He died on October 31, 1990, aged 70, from injuries sustained in an automobile accident two months earlier.

== Filmography ==
The following credits, Awards & Nominations have been taken from Hugh McPhillips at IMDb

1. Freddy's Nightmares ....Cabin Fever (1989) 1 TV episode .... Old Man
2. Murder, She Wrote ....Murder Through the Looking Glass (1988) 1 TV episode .... Father Paul Kelly
3. Kandyland (1987) .... Minister
4. The Young and the Restless .... Andre, Colonnade Room Patron / ... (4 episodes, 1986)... a.k.a. Y&R (USA: promotional abbreviation)
5. Bachelor Party (1984) .... Father O'Donnell
6. Joysticks (1983) .... Pope ... a.k.a. Joy Sticks (International: English title: video box title) ... a.k.a. Video Madness
7. The Kid with the Broken Halo (1982) (TV) .... Pierce
8. The Jeffersons .... Not So Dearly Beloved (1981) 1 TV episode .... Old Man
9. Days of Our Lives (1965) TV series .... Hugh Pearson (unknown episodes, 1979)
10. All in the Family .... The Return of Stephanie's Father (1 TV episode, 1979)....Derelict

== Awards and nominations ==
1980 Won Daytime Emmy Outstanding Guest/Cameo Appearance in a Daytime Drama Series for Days of Our Lives in the 1980 as Hugh Pearson

1976 Nominated Daytime Emmy Outstanding Individual Director for a Daytime Drama Series for: "The Doctors (soap opera)"

1974 Nominated Daytime Emmy Best Individual Director for a Drama Series for: "The Doctors (soap opera)" (1963)

== Related links ==
- facebook
