= Braedyn Bruner =

American actress

- Born: Dallas, Texas
- Occupation: Actress
- Years active: 2009–present

Braedyn Bruner is an American actress. She is best known for playing Emma Drake in the soap opera General Hospital.

== Early life ==
Bruner was born in Dallas and raised in nearby Lucas, Texas.

== Career ==
Bruner made her TV debut on an episode of Barney & Friends in 2009. She played the lead Millie in the drama film Break and appeared in the horror film V/H/S/Beyond directed by Justin Long. Bruners first big role came playing Emma Drake in the soap opera General Hospital. She took over the role after the shock exit of Brooklyn Rae Silzer.She was a big fan of the show prior to joining. For this role, Bruner received a Daytime Emmy Award nomination in the Outstanding Emerging Talent in a Daytime Drama Series category.

== Personal life ==
She is very good friends with Giovanni Mazza, who plays her onscreen partner Giovanni Palmieri.

== Filmography ==
=== Film ===
Year	Title	Role	Notes
2015	Hoovey	Student	
2017	The Midnight Man	Heather	Short
2020	Full Out 2: You Got This!	Natalie	
2024	Break	Millie	
2024	V/H/S/Beyond	Angela	

=== Television ===
Year	Title	Role	Notes
2009	Barney & Friends	French Girl	Episode; Bonjour, Barney!: France
2024-2025	General Hospital	Emma Drake	78 episodes

== Awards and nominations ==
List of awards and nominations
Year	Award	Category	Work	Result	Ref.
2026	Daytime Emmy Award	Outstanding Emerging Talent in a Daytime Drama Series	General Hospital	Nominated	
