= NBC Children's Theatre =

Television series

NBC Children's Theatre is an American television anthology series airing from November 3, 1963 to March 17, 1973. Its stories were primarily drawn from classical and contemporary children's literature, including The Merry Adventures of Robin Hood and Stuart Little.

Narrators were Bill Cosby, Johnny Carson, Hugh Downs, and Burl Ives. Actors included Fran Allison, Geraldine Page, James Earl Jones, Jonathan Winters, Tony Dow, Tim Matheson, and Sterling Holloway.

George A. Heinemann was the executive producer, and Frank Pacelli was the director. Kay Rockefeller and Richard Kinter were the writers.

The show was nominated for four Emmys and won two Peabody Awards.
