= 100 Centre Street =

- Promotional advertisement
- Genre: Legal drama
- Starring: Alan Arkin; LaTanya Richardson
- Country of origin: United States
- Original language: English
- No. of seasons: 2
- No. of episodes: 31

Production
- Executive producer: Sidney Lumet
- Production companies: Jaffe/Braunstein; Films Ltd. and; A&E Television Networks; in association with Pearson Television International

Original release
- Network: A&E Network
- Release: January 15, 2001 – March 5, 2002

100 Centre Street is an American legal drama created by Sidney Lumet and starring Alan Arkin, Val Avery, Bobby Cannavale, Joel de la Fuente and Paula Devicq.

== Premise ==
The show takes its name for the Manhattan street address of the New York City Criminal Court and the Supreme Court of the State of New York, Criminal Term, for New York County. The show aired in the United States on the A&E Network cable television channel from 2001 to 2002. Some called it a grittier and more accurate version of Law & Order, although unlike Law & Order, 100 Centre Street focused more on the personal lives of its characters. Episodes focused on the friendship between Judge Joe Rifkind, a liberal Jew, and Judge Atallah "Queenie" Sims, a lesbian African American, as well as the romance between Bobby and Cynthia, Ramon's infidelity to his wife Cassandra, J.J.'s potentially corrupt mob ties, Fatima's drug addiction, Rebecca Rifkind's estrangement from her father, and Spiegelman and Byrnes's political scheming.

== Main cast ==
- Alan Arkin as Judge Joe Rifkind
- Val Avery as Sal Gentile
- Bobby Cannavale as ADA Jeremiah "J.J." Jellinek
- Joel de la Fuente as ADA Peter Davies
- Paula Devicq as ADA/private attorney Cynthia Bennington
- Manny Pérez as Legal Aid attorney Ramon Rodriguez
- LaTanya Richardson as Judge Atallah Sims
- Joseph Lyle Taylor as ADA/PI Bobby Esposito
- Michole Briana White as Legal Aid attorney Fatima Kelly
- Bill J Vlasnic as Billy, Task Force detective on Jellinek's squad

== Episodes ==
=== Season 1 (2001) ===
No. overall	No. in season	Title	Directed by	Written by	Original release date	Prod. code
1	1	"Bobby and Cynthia"	Sidney Lumet	Sidney Lumet	January 15, 2001	101
2	2	"Queenie and Joe"	Sidney Lumet	Sidney Lumet	January 15, 2001	102
3	3	"And Justice for Some"	Jerry London	Siobhan Byrne O'Connor	January 22, 2001	112
4	4	"My Brother's Keeper"	Steven Shill	Sidney Lumet	January 29, 2001	103
5	5	"No Good Deed Goes Unpunished"	Jerry London	Steven Schwartz	February 5, 2001	104
6	6	"Hostage"	Jerry London	David Black	February 12, 2001	105
7	7	"Things Change"	Steven Shill	Richard Wesley	February 19, 2001	113
8	8	"Lady Paris"	Sidney Lumet	David Black	February 26, 2001	106
9	9	"A Shot in the Dark"	John O'Connell	Steven Schwartz	March 5, 2001	107
10	10	"Joe Must Go"	Sidney Lumet	James Solomon	March 12, 2001	108
11	11	"The Bug"	Steven Shill	David Black	March 19, 2001	109
12	12	"Domestic Abuses"	Steven Shill	Steven Schwartz	March 26, 2001	110
13	13	"Let's Make a Night of It"	Sidney Lumet	Sidney Lumet	April 2, 2001	111

=== Season 2 (2001–02) ===
No. overall	No. in season	Title	Directed by	Written by	Original release date	Prod. code
14	1	"Kids: Part 1"	Sidney Lumet	Sidney Lumet	October 8, 2001	201
15	2	"Kids: Part 2"	Sidney Lumet	Rudy Wurlitzer & Sidney Lumet	October 15, 2001	202
16	3	"Love Stories"	Don Scardino	Siobhan Byrne O'Connor	October 22, 2001	203
17	4	"Queenie's Tough"	Steven Shill	Sidney Lumet	October 29, 2001	204
18	5	"The Fix"	Arthur Penn	David Black	November 6, 2001	205
19	6	"Daughters"	Sidney Lumet	Rudy Wurlitzer	November 13, 2001	206
20	7	"Lost Causes"	Steven Shill	Steven Schwartz	November 20, 2001	207
21	8	"Queenie's Running"	Don Scardino	Sidney Lumet	November 27, 2001	208
22	9	"Andromeda and the Monster"	John O'Connell	David Black	December 11, 2001	209
23	10	"Bottlecaps"	Susanna Styron	Susanna Styron	December 18, 2001	210
24	11	"End of the Month"	Don Scardino	Robert Leuci	January 8, 2002	211
25	12	"Give Up or Fight"	Sidney Lumet	Steven Schwartz & Rudy Wurlitzer	January 15, 2002	212
26	13	"Babies"	Sidney Lumet	Rudy Wurlitzer	January 22, 2002	213
27	14	"Zero Tolerance"	Steven Shill	Siobhan Byrne O'Connor	January 29, 2002	214
28	15	"Justice Delayed"	John O'Connell	Steven Schwartz	February 5, 2002	215
29	16	"Hurricane Paul"	Don Scardino	Warren Leight	February 12, 2002	216
30	17	"Fathers"	John O'Connell	Richard Wesley	February 26, 2002	217
31	18	"It's About Love"	Sidney Lumet	Siobhan Byrne O'Connor & Rudy Wurlitzer	March 5, 2002	218

== Guest stars ==
- Sidney Armus as DA Spiegelman
- Dennis Boutsikaris as Executive ADA Gil Byrnes
- Paul Butler as Det. Willard Block
- Sarita Choudhury as ADA Julia Brooks
- Chuck Cooper as Charlie the Bridgeman (bailiff)
- Tawny Cypress as Cassandra Rodriguez
- Margo Martindale as Legal Aid supervisor Michelle Grange
- Phyllis Newman as Sarah Rifkind
- Amy Ryan as Rebecca Rifkind

=== Notable guest stars ===
- Matthew Arkin
- Jude Ciccolella
- Terry Serpico
- Anna Deavere Smith
- Floyd Vivino
- Kerry Washington
- Judy Reyes
- Eric Millegan
- Brian Scolaro
