= Heather Hill (director) =

American television director (1939 or 1940 – 2025)

- Born: 1939 or 1940; Rye, New York, US
- Died: October 10, 2025; Las Vegas, Nevada, US
- Education: Rye Country Day School

Heather H. Hill (1939 or 1940, Rye, New York – October 10, 2025, Las Vegas, Nevada) was an American television director and producer. She was born in Rye, New York, and died at her home in Las Vegas on October 10, 2025, at the age of 85.

== Positions held ==
- Supervising Producer on The Catlins; 1984
- Director on Search for Tomorrow, General Hospital, Love of Life, As the World Turns, Baywatch; 1992, and The Young and the Restless; 1986 - 2000

== Awards and nominations ==
Hill was nominated for 13 Daytime Emmy awards from 1988 to 2000, in the category Outstanding Drama Series Directing Team, for her work on The Young and the Restless. She won the award six times, in 1988, 1989, 1996, 1997, 1998, and 1999. Her first win was shared with Rudy Vejar, Frank Pacelli, Randy Robbins, and Betty Rothenberg.
