= Daytime Emmy Award for Outstanding Drama Series =

Daytime drama award

- Current: 52nd Daytime Emmy Awards
- Awarded for: Outstanding Drama Series
- Country: United States
- Presented by: NATAS; ATAS
- First award: 1972
- Currently held by: General Hospital (2026)

Highlights
- Most awards: General Hospital (18)
- Most nominations: The Young and the Restless (34)
- Website: emmyonline.org/daytime

The Daytime Emmy Award for Outstanding Drama Series is an award presented annually by the National Academy of Television Arts and Sciences (NATAS) and Academy of Television Arts & Sciences (ATAS). It was first awarded at the 24th Primetime Emmy Awards ceremony, held in 1972, when the award was originally called Outstanding Achievement in a Daytime Drama for two years.

The first daytime-themed Emmy Awards were presented in 1974, when this award was renamed Outstanding Drama Series and given in honor of a daytime drama. The awards ceremony was not televised in 1983 and 1984, having been criticized for lack of integrity.

The award was first presented to The Doctors, which first aired in 1963. General Hospital holds the record for the most awards, winning on eighteen occasions. In 2007, Guiding Light and The Young and the Restless tied, which was the first tie in this category. The Young and the Restless has also received the most nominations, with a total of thirty-three. ABC has been the most successful network, with a total of twenty-one wins.

As of the 2026 ceremony, General Hospital is the most recent recipient of the award.

== Winners and nominees ==
Listed below are the winners of the award for each year, as well as the other nominees.

Table key
‡	Indicates the winner

=== 1970s ===
Year	Program	Network	Ref.
1972 (24th)	The Doctors ‡	NBC	
1972 (24th)	All My Children	ABC	
1972 (24th)	Another World	NBC	
1972 (24th)	General Hospital	ABC	
1973 (25th)	The Edge of Night ‡	CBS	
1973 (25th)	Days of Our Lives	NBC	
1973 (25th)	One Life to Live	ABC	
1973 (25th)	The Doctors	NBC	
1974 (1st)	The Doctors ‡	NBC	
1974 (1st)	Days of Our Lives	NBC	
1974 (1st)	General Hospital	ABC	
1975 (2nd)	The Young and the Restless ‡	CBS	
1975 (2nd)	Another World	NBC	
1975 (2nd)	Days of Our Lives	NBC	
1976 (3rd)	Another World ‡	NBC	
1976 (3rd)	All My Children	ABC	
1976 (3rd)	Days of Our Lives	NBC	
1976 (3rd)	The Young and the Restless	CBS	
1977 (4th)	Ryan's Hope ‡	ABC	
1977 (4th)	All My Children	ABC	
1977 (4th)	Another World	NBC	
1977 (4th)	Days of Our Lives	NBC	
1977 (4th)	The Edge of Night	ABC	
1978 (5th)	Days of Our Lives ‡	NBC	
1978 (5th)	All My Children	ABC	
1978 (5th)	Ryan's Hope	ABC	
1978 (5th)	The Young and the Restless	CBS	
1979 (6th)	Ryan's Hope ‡	ABC	
1979 (6th)	All My Children	ABC	
1979 (6th)	Days of Our Lives	NBC	
1979 (6th)	The Young and the Restless	CBS	

=== 1980s ===
Year	Program	Network	Ref.
1980 (7th)	Guiding Light ‡	CBS	
1980 (7th)	All My Children	ABC	
1980 (7th)	Another World	NBC	
1981 (8th)	General Hospital ‡	ABC	
1981 (8th)	All My Children	ABC	
1981 (8th)	Ryan's Hope	ABC	
1982 (9th)	Guiding Light ‡	CBS	
1982 (9th)	All My Children	ABC	
1982 (9th)	General Hospital	ABC	
1982 (9th)	Ryan's Hope	ABC	
1983 (10th)	The Young and the Restless ‡	CBS	
1983 (10th)	All My Children	ABC	
1983 (10th)	Days of Our Lives	NBC	
1983 (10th)	General Hospital	ABC	
1983 (10th)	One Life to Live	ABC	
1984 (11th)	General Hospital ‡	ABC	
1984 (11th)	All My Children	ABC	
1984 (11th)	Days of Our Lives	NBC	
1985 (12th)	The Young and the Restless ‡	CBS	
1985 (12th)	All My Children	ABC	
1985 (12th)	Days of Our Lives	NBC	
1985 (12th)	General Hospital	ABC	
1985 (12th)	Guiding Light	CBS	
1986 (13th)	The Young and the Restless ‡	CBS	
1986 (13th)	All My Children	ABC	
1986 (13th)	As the World Turns	CBS	
1986 (13th)	General Hospital	ABC	
1987 (14th)	As the World Turns ‡	CBS	
1987 (14th)	All My Children	ABC	
1987 (14th)	Santa Barbara	NBC	
1987 (14th)	The Young and the Restless	CBS	
1988 (15th)	Santa Barbara ‡	NBC	
1988 (15th)	All My Children	ABC	
1988 (15th)	As the World Turns	CBS	
1988 (15th)	General Hospital	ABC	
1988 (15th)	The Young and the Restless	CBS	
1989 (16th)	Santa Barbara ‡	NBC	
1989 (16th)	All My Children	ABC	
1989 (16th)	As the World Turns	CBS	
1989 (16th)	General Hospital	ABC	
1989 (16th)	Guiding Light	CBS	
1989 (16th)	The Young and the Restless	CBS	

=== 1990s ===
Year	Program	Network	Ref.
1990 (17th)	Santa Barbara ‡	NBC	
1990 (17th)	All My Children	ABC	
1990 (17th)	Guiding Light	CBS	
1990 (17th)	The Young and the Restless	CBS	
1991 (18th)	As the World Turns ‡	CBS	
1991 (18th)	All My Children	ABC	
1991 (18th)	Guiding Light	CBS	
1991 (18th)	The Young and the Restless	CBS	
1992 (19th)	All My Children ‡	ABC	
1992 (19th)	As the World Turns	CBS	
1992 (19th)	Guiding Light	CBS	
1992 (19th)	The Young and the Restless	CBS	
1993 (20th)	The Young and the Restless ‡	CBS	
1993 (20th)	All My Children	ABC	
1993 (20th)	As the World Turns	CBS	
1993 (20th)	Guiding Light	CBS	
1994 (21st)	All My Children ‡	ABC	
1994 (21st)	As the World Turns	CBS	
1994 (21st)	Guiding Light	CBS	
1994 (21st)	The Young and the Restless	CBS	
1995 (22nd)	General Hospital ‡	ABC	
1995 (22nd)	All My Children	ABC	
1995 (22nd)	Days of Our Lives	NBC	
1995 (22nd)	The Young and the Restless	CBS	
1996 (26th)	General Hospital ‡	ABC	
1996 (26th)	All My Children	ABC	
1996 (26th)	Days of Our Lives	NBC	
1996 (26th)	The Young and the Restless	CBS	
1997 (27th)	General Hospital ‡	ABC	
1997 (27th)	All My Children	ABC	
1997 (27th)	Days of Our Lives	NBC	
1997 (27th)	The Young and the Restless	CBS	
1998 (27th)	All My Children ‡	ABC	
1998 (27th)	Days of Our Lives	NBC	
1998 (27th)	General Hospital	ABC	
1998 (27th)	The Young and the Restless	CBS	
1999 (26th)	General Hospital ‡	ABC	
1999 (26th)	All My Children	ABC	
1999 (26th)	Days of Our Lives	NBC	
1999 (26th)	The Young and the Restless	CBS	

=== 2000s ===
Year	Program	Network	Ref.
2000 (27th)	General Hospital ‡	ABC	
2000 (27th)	All My Children	ABC	
2000 (27th)	One Life to Live	ABC	
2000 (27th)	The Young and the Restless	CBS	
2001 (28th)	As the World Turns ‡	CBS	
2001 (28th)	All My Children	ABC	
2001 (28th)	General Hospital	ABC	
2001 (28th)	The Young and the Restless	CBS	
2002 (29th)	One Life to Live ‡	ABC	
2002 (29th)	All My Children	ABC	
2002 (29th)	As the World Turns	CBS	
2002 (29th)	The Young and the Restless	CBS	
2003 (30th)	As the World Turns ‡	CBS	
2003 (30th)	The Bold and the Beautiful	CBS	
2003 (30th)	Port Charles	ABC	
2003 (30th)	The Young and the Restless	CBS	
2004 (31st)	The Young and the Restless ‡	CBS	
2004 (31st)	As the World Turns	CBS	
2004 (31st)	The Bold and the Beautiful	CBS	
2004 (31st)	General Hospital	ABC	
2004 (31st)	Guiding Light	CBS	
2005 (32nd)	General Hospital ‡	ABC	
2005 (32nd)	All My Children	ABC	
2005 (32nd)	As the World Turns	CBS	
2005 (32nd)	The Young and the Restless	CBS	
2006 (33rd)	General Hospital ‡	ABC	
2006 (33rd)	As the World Turns	CBS	
2006 (33rd)	Guiding Light	CBS	
2006 (33rd)	The Young and the Restless	CBS	
2007 (34th)	Guiding Light ‡	CBS	
2007 (34th)	The Young and the Restless ‡	CBS	
2007 (34th)	The Bold and the Beautiful	CBS	
2007 (34th)	One Life to Live	ABC	
2008 (35th)	General Hospital ‡	ABC	
2008 (35th)	Guiding Light	CBS	
2008 (35th)	One Life to Live	ABC	
2008 (35th)	The Young and the Restless	CBS	
2009 (36th)	The Bold and the Beautiful ‡	CBS	
2009 (36th)	All My Children	ABC	
2009 (36th)	Days of Our Lives	NBC	

=== 2010s ===
Year	Program	Network	Ref.
2010 (37th)	The Bold and the Beautiful ‡	CBS	
2010 (37th)	All My Children	ABC	
2010 (37th)	General Hospital	ABC	
2010 (37th)	The Young and the Restless	CBS	
2011 (38th)	The Bold and the Beautiful ‡	CBS	
2011 (38th)	All My Children	ABC	
2011 (38th)	General Hospital	ABC	
2011 (38th)	The Young and the Restless	CBS	
2012 (39th)	General Hospital ‡	ABC	
2012 (39th)	All My Children	ABC	
2012 (39th)	Days of Our Lives	NBC	
2012 (39th)	The Young and the Restless	CBS	
2013 (40th)	Days of Our Lives ‡	NBC	
2013 (40th)	The Bold and the Beautiful	CBS	
2013 (40th)	General Hospital	ABC	
2013 (40th)	One Life to Live	ABC	
2013 (40th)	The Young and the Restless	CBS	
2014 (41st)	The Young and the Restless (Note: Executive Producer: Jill Farren Phelps, Supervising Producers: John Fisher, Tony Morina, Producer: Mary O’Leary) ‡	CBS	
2014 (41st)	The Bold and the Beautiful (Note: Executive Producer: Bradley Bell, Supervising Producers: Rhonda Friedman, Edward Scott, Coordinating Producer: Mark Pinciotti, Producers: Colleen Bell, Cynthia J. Popp, Casey Kasprzyk)	CBS	
2014 (41st)	Days of Our Lives (Note: Executive Producer: Ken Corday, Co-Executive Producers: Lisa DeCazotte, Greg Meng Senior Coordinating Producers: Janet Spellman-Drucker, Tim Stevens, Coordinating Producer: Randy Dugan, Producer: Albert Alarr)	NBC	
2014 (41st)	One Life to Live (Note: Executive Producers: Rich Frank, Jeff Kwatinetz, Jennifer Pepperman, Supervising Producer: Catherine Maher-Smith, Coordinating Producers: Vivian Gundaker, Jennifer Salamone, Line Producer: Chris Savage)	TOLN.com	
2015 (42nd)
2015 (42nd)	Days of Our Lives (Note: Executive Producer: Ken Corday, Senior Coordinating Producer: Janet Spellman-Drucker, Co-Executive Producers: Lisa DeCazotte, Greg Meng, Coordinating Producer: Randy Dugan, Producer: Albert Alarr) ‡	NBC	
2015 (42nd)	The Young and the Restless (Note: Executive Producer: Jill Farren Phelps, Supervising Producers: John Fisher, Tony Morina, Coordinating Producer: Mary O'Leary, Producer: Mary O’Leary) ‡	CBS	
2015 (42nd)	The Bold and the Beautiful (Note: Executive Producer: Bradley Bell, Supervising Producers: Rhonda Friedman, Edward Scott, Casey Kasprzyk Coordinating Producer: Mark Pinciotti, Producers: Colleen Bell, Cynthia J. Popp,)	CBS	
2015 (42nd)	General Hospital (Note: Executive Producer: Frank Valentini, Coordinating Producer: Jennifer Whittaker-Brogdon, Producers: Mercer Barrows, Michelle Henry, Mary Kelly Weir)	ABC	
2016 (43rd)	General Hospital ‡	ABC	
2016 (43rd)	The Bold and the Beautiful	CBS	
2016 (43rd)	Days of Our Lives	NBC	
2016 (43rd)	The Young and the Restless	CBS	
2017 (44th)	General Hospital ‡	ABC	
2017 (44th)	The Bold and the Beautiful	CBS	
2017 (44th)	Days of Our Lives	NBC	
2017 (44th)	The Young and the Restless	CBS	
2018 (45th)	Days of Our Lives ‡	NBC	
2018 (45th)	The Bold and the Beautiful	CBS	
2018 (45th)	General Hospital	ABC	
2018 (45th)	The Young and the Restless	CBS	
2019 (46th)	The Young and the Restless ‡	CBS	
2019 (46th)	The Bold and the Beautiful	CBS	
2019 (46th)	Days of Our Lives	NBC	
2019 (46th)	General Hospital	ABC	

=== 2020s ===
Year	Program	Network	Ref.
2020 (47th)	The Young and the Restless ‡	CBS	
2020 (47th)	The Bold and the Beautiful	CBS	
2020 (47th)	Days of Our Lives	NBC	
2020 (47th)	General Hospital	ABC	
2021 (48th)	General Hospital ‡	ABC	
2021 (48th)	The Bold and the Beautiful	CBS	
2021 (48th)	Days of Our Lives	NBC	
2021 (48th)	The Young and the Restless	CBS	
2022 (49th)
2022 (49th)	General Hospital ‡	ABC	
2022 (49th)	Beyond Salem	Peacock	
2022 (49th)	The Bold and the Beautiful	CBS	
2022 (49th)	Days of Our Lives	NBC	
2022 (49th)	The Young and the Restless	CBS	
2023 (50th)
2023 (50th)	General Hospital ‡	ABC	
2023 (50th)	The Bay	Popstar! TV	
2023 (50th)	The Bold and the Beautiful	CBS	
2023 (50th)	Days of Our Lives	NBC/Peacock	
2023 (50th)	The Young and the Restless	CBS	
2024 (51st)
2024 (51st)	General Hospital ‡	ABC	
2024 (51st)	The Bay	Popstar! TV	
2024 (51st)	The Bold and the Beautiful	CBS	
2024 (51st)	Days of Our Lives	Peacock	
2024 (51st)	Neighbours	Amazon Freevee	
2024 (51st)	The Young and the Restless	CBS	
2025 (52nd)
2025 (52nd)	General Hospital ‡	ABC	
2025 (52nd)	Days of Our Lives	Peacock	
2025 (52nd)	The Young and the Restless	CBS	
2026 (53rd)
2026 (53rd)	General Hospital ‡	ABC	
2026 (53rd)	Beyond the Gates	CBS	
2026 (53rd)	Days of Our Lives	Peacock	
2026 (53rd)	The Young and the Restless	CBS	

== Series with multiple wins ==
18 wins

- General Hospital

11 wins

- The Young and the Restless

4 wins

- As the World Turns
- Days of Our Lives

3 wins

- All My Children
- The Bold and the Beautiful
- Guiding Light
- Santa Barbara

2 wins

- The Doctors
- Ryan's Hope
