= John O'Connell (director) =

John O'Connell (born November 13, 1959) is an American television director. He has worked in Dramatic and Music multi-camera television production for over 20 years.

== Positions held ==
100 Centre Street

- Director (2000, 2001)
- Associate Director(2000, 2001)

Private Sessions

Copshop

Night Music

As the World Turns

- Director (2004-2010)
- Occasional Director (2002-2003)

Guiding Light

- Occasional Director (2003)
- Director (1991-1998)
- Associate Director (1990-1996)

One Life to Live

- Director(1998-2000)
- Occasional Director (2003)

== Awards and nominations ==
Daytime Emmy Award

- Win, 2007, Directing Team, As the World Turns (Shared win with Maria Wagner, Michael Eilbaum, Sonia Blangiardo, Jennifer Pepperman, Habib Azar, Christopher Goutman, Michael Kerner, Carol Sedwick, Janet Andrews, James Kowal, Brian Lydell, Jennifer Blood, Nancy Barron, Alexandra Roalsvig, Brett Hellman
- General Hospital
- Guiding Light
- One Life To Live
- Win, 2004, Directing Team, Guiding Light
- Nomination, 1990-1991, 1993, 2004, Directing Team, Guiding Light
