= She Waits =

1972 American horror television film

- VHS artwork
- Also known as: Night of the Exorcist (UK)
- Written by: Art Wallace
- Directed by: Delbert Mann
- Starring: Patty Duke; David McCallum; Dorothy McGuire; Lew Ayres
- Composer: Morton Stevens
- Country of origin: United States
- Original language: English

Production
- Executive producer: Charles W. Fries
- Producer: Delbert Mann
- Cinematography: Charles F. Wheeler
- Editor: John F. Schreyer
- Running time: 74 minutes
- Production company: Metromedia Producers Corporation

Original release
- Network: CBS
- Release: January 28, 1972

She Waits is a 1972 American television horror film directed by Delbert Mann and starring Patty Duke, David McCallum, and Dorothy McGuire. It follows a murdered woman whose spirit possesses her husband's new wife. The film was released in the United Kingdom under the title, Night of the Exorcist.

== Cast ==
- Patty Duke as Laura Wilson
- David McCallum as Mark Wilson
- Dorothy McGuire as Sarah Wilson
- Lew Ayres as Dr. Sam Carpenter
- Beulah Bondi as Mrs. Medina
- James T. Callahan as David Brody
- Nelson Olmsted as Antique Dealer Kurawicz

== Reception ==
Author and critic John Kenneth Muir wrote:

A story of spirit possession, She Waits (1972) is one of the most long-winded and dull of the early 1970’s made-for-TV horror films. Basically, the movie sets down in the Wilson family house, and rarely leaves that setting... She Waits features no real action, no real explanation for the survival of Elaine’s spirit in the house, and no real horror, either....
