= Daytime Emmy Award for Outstanding Emerging Talent in a Daytime Drama Series =

Annual film award

- Awarded for: Best performance by an outstanding emerging talent in a daytime drama series
- Country: United States
- Presented by: NATAS; ATAS
- First award: 2025
- Currently held by: Ambyr Michelle, Beyond the Gates (2026)
- Website: theemmys.tv/daytime/

The Daytime Emmy Award for Outstanding Emerging Talent in a Daytime Drama Series is an award presented annually by the National Academy of Television Arts and Sciences (NATAS) and the Academy of Television Arts & Sciences (ATAS). It was first awarded at the 52nd Daytime Emmy Awards to a performer who has delivered an outstanding performance as an "emerging talent" while working within the daytime drama industry.

The Emerging Talent award has been presented twice, to two performers. As of the 2026 ceremony, Ambyr Michelle is the most recent winner in this category for her portrayal of Eva Thomas on Beyond the Gates.

== Nomination process ==
To be considered for this category, performers must meet all of the following criteria:

- Be on their first Daytime contract with no previous Daytime Emmy acting nominations.
- Have been part of their Daytime Drama for two years or less at the time of consideration.
- Appear in a speaking role with at least one multi-episode story arc.
- Anyone who wins the category once will be ineligible to win it again.

This category differs from the retired Outstanding Younger Performer in a Drama Series—and its earlier gender-specific counterparts—which imposed an age restriction on nominees. By contrast, the new category has no age restriction, shifting the focus away from a performer's age and instead highlighting their status as a newcomer to daytime television.

== Winners and nominees ==
Listed below are the winners of the award for each year, as well as the other nominees.

Table key
‡	Indicates the winner

Daytime Emmy Award for Outstanding Emerging Talent in a Daytime Drama Series
Year	Actor	Program	Role	Network	Ref.
2025 (52nd)
2025 (52nd)	Lisa Yamada ‡	The Bold and the Beautiful	Luna Nozawa	CBS	
2025 (52nd)	Olivia d'Abo	The Bay	Fifi Garrett	Popstar! TV	
2025 (52nd)	AnnaLynne McCord	Days of Our Lives	Cat Greene	Peacock	
2025 (52nd)	Ashley Puzemis	Days of Our Lives	Holly Jonas	Peacock	
2025 (52nd)	Christian Weissmann	The Bold and the Beautiful	Remy Pryce	CBS	
2026 (53rd)
2026 (53rd)	Ambyr Michelle ‡	Beyond the Gates	Eva Thomas	CBS	
2026 (53rd)	Braedyn Bruner	General Hospital	Emma Scorpio-Drake	ABC	
2026 (53rd)	Al Calderon	Days of Our Lives	Javi Hernandez	Peacock	
2026 (53rd)	Alice Halsey	Days of Our Lives	Rachel Black	Peacock	
2026 (53rd)	Giovanni Mazza	General Hospital	Gio Palmieri	ABC	
2026 (53rd)	Arielle Prepetit	Beyond the Gates	Naomi Hamilton Hawthorne	CBS	
