= Jack Wood (director) =

American television director

Jack Wood (1924–2007) was an American television director and writer. Born in Longview, Texas, he died of heart failure in Long Beach, California, on February 18, 2007.

== Positions held ==
- Writer on All My Children
- Director on One Life to Live and The Best of Everything

== Awards and nominations ==
Wood was nominated for ten Daytime Emmy awards in the categories Outstanding Writing for a Daytime Drama Series, Outstanding Writing in a Drama Series, and Outstanding Drama Series Writing Team, for his work on All My Children. He was nominated from 1977 to 1988, and won twice in 1985 and 1988. His first nomination was shared with Agnes Nixon, Wisner Washam, Kiki McCabe, and Mary K. Wells, while his first win was shared with the previous minus McCabe, and including Lorraine Broderick, Victor Miller, Art Wallace, Clarice Blackburn, Susan Kirshenbaum, Elizabeth Wallace, Elizabeth Page, and Carlina Della Pietra.
