= Phil Sogard =

American film and television director (1933–2023)

Phillip Wayne Sogard (April 6, 1933 – December 22, 2023) was an American film and television director.

== Life and career ==
Sogard was hired by Gloria Monty to be on the directing staff of ABC Daytime's General Hospital, which he directed for several years in the late 1980s and early 1990s. In 1992, Ken Corday hired him to join the directing team of NBC Daytime's soap opera Days of Our Lives.

Sogard was a member of the Directors Guild of America. He died on December 22, 2023, at the age of 90.

== Filmography ==
- General Hospital
- Days of Our Lives
- Days of Our Lives' 35th Anniversary
- Days of Our Lives' Christmas

== Awards ==
Daytime Emmy Awards:

- 1980 - Outstanding Direction for a Daytime Drama Series for General Hospital - Nominated.
- 1981 - Outstanding Direction for a Daytime Drama Series for General Hospital - Won.
- 1982 - Outstanding Direction for a Daytime Drama Series for General Hospital - Won.
- 1983 - Outstanding Direction for a Daytime Drama Series for General Hospital - Nominated.
- 1996 - Outstanding Drama Series Directing Team for Days of Our Lives - Nominated.
- 1997 - Outstanding Drama Series Directing Team for Days of Our Lives - Nominated.
- 1998 - Outstanding Drama Series Directing Team for Days of Our Lives - Nominated.
- 1999 - Outstanding Drama Series Directing Team for Days of Our Lives - Nominated.
- 2003 - Outstanding Drama Series Directing Team for Days of Our Lives - Nominated.
- 2006 - Outstanding Drama Series Directing Team for Days of Our Lives - Nominated.
- 2009 - Outstanding Drama Series Directing Team for Days of Our Lives - Nominated.
