= Andrea Giles Rich =

American television soap opera director

Andrea Giles Rich is an American television soap opera director.

== Directing Credits ==
All My Children

- Occasional Director (2002–2003)

As the World Turns

- Occasional Director (2001–2003)
- Associate Director (Late 1990s)

Guiding Light

- Associate Director (1996–2009)

One Life to Live

- Associate Director (1987–1993)

== Awards and nominations ==
Daytime Emmy Award

- Win, 2007, Directing, Guiding Light
- Nomination, 1988–1989, Directing, One Life to Live
