= Paca Thomas =

Paca Thomas is the owner of pacaworks.com, a multi-media production company. He can also be heard weekly as Bernie Taupin's sidekick/producer on Bernie Taupin's American Roots Radio on SiriusXM's The Loft. He is the son of Philadelphia DJ George Thomas.

He won five Emmy awards in sound design for TV animation, plus over a dozen nominations for MPSE Golden Reel Awards while working with Disney, Universal Studios, Sony and DreamWorks among others. Prior to pacaworks, Paca was also the co-creator and partner in VidLit.com, a pioneer in web multi-media production.

With degrees in theatre and music, Paca began his career as an actor and has alternately made his way as a singer, composer, lyricist, music producer, sound designer, graphic artist, flash animator and web designer.

Pronounced "Pay-ka", the name Paca is a Welsh surname.

He is married to Sheri Anderson, talent manager and author of the fiction novel series Salem's Secrets, Scandals and Lies based on NBC's long-running soap opera Days of our Lives.
