= Mary O'Leary (producer) =

Mary O'Leary is an American television producer, and the former producer of the daytime television dramas Guiding Light, Another World, One Life to Live, General Hospital and The Young & The Restless.

She was born and raised in Providence, Rhode Island. After graduating from Rhode Island College she moved to New York City to work in theatre production. She spent the next few years stage managing shows Off-Broadway, in Regional Theatre and in Summer Stock, as well as an international tour to India and Syria with Rhode Island’s Tony Award winning regional theatre, Trinity Repertory Company.

Her career goal shifted when she was hired to work as a production coordinator for the CBS-TV daytime drama, Guiding Light. Over 11 years she rose in the ranks. She was on the producing team for Guiding Light 40th Anniversary Primetime Special in 1992; Guiding Light Roger Thorpe The Scandal Years (home video) in 1994 and Guiding Light Reva The Scarlet Years (home video) in 1995.

During this the same time she was also co-producer of the theatrical production company, Clunes Associates with Jonathan Frid, who was best known for his portrayal of vampire, Barnabas Collins, on the 1960’s gothic daytime television serial, Dark Shadows. Together they developed a series of one-man shows that Frid performed at universities, libraries and performing arts centers across the country.

After a decade of partnership, Frid retired to Ancaster, Ontario and Mary went on to produce NBC-TV’s Another World and ABC-TV’s One Life to Live. In 2001 she moved to Los Angeles and became a producer for General Hospital. She won four Daytime Emmy Awards for her work.

After eleven years on General Hospital, she switched gears and was the Coordinating Producer for the Sony Pictures/Nickelodeon co-production, Hollywood Heights, a limited-run nighttime series based on the Spanish telenovela, Alcanzar una Estrella (Reach for a Star). This was followed by a five-year stint as a producer for the number one daytime serial, The Young and the Restless, for which she garnered three Daytime Emmy Awards.

In 2019, she was hired to conceive, direct and produce a feature-length documentary about her friend and colleague Jonathan Frid. Dark Shadows and Beyond - The Jonathan Frid Story was released by MPI Media Group in October 2021. The film received several film festival awards, a Telly Award for Excellence and a 2022 Daytime Emmy Nomination for Outstanding Special.

== Credits ==
- Dark Shadows and Beyond: The Jonathan Frid Story - Director and Producer (October 5, 2021)
- The Young and the Restless - Producer (September 2012 – August 2016)
- Hollywood Heights - Coordinating Producer (April–August 2012)
- General Hospital - Producer (January 2001 – March 2012)
- One Life to Live - Producer (September 1997 – December 2000)
- Another World - Coordinating Producer (July 1995 – September 1996)
- Guiding Light:
  - Associate Producer (March 1993 – June 1995)
  - Assistant Producer (March 1990 - February 1993)
  - Assistant to the Producers (January 1985 - February 1990)
  - Production Coordinator (June 1984 -December 1984)
- Guiding Light Specials:
  - Associate Producer: Guiding Light Reva The Scarlet Years (Home Video) P&G Productions and CBS-TV 1995
  - Associate Producer: Guiding Light Roger Thorpe The Scandal Years (Home Video) P&G Productions and CBS 1994
  - Coordinating Producer: Guiding Light 40th Anniversary Primetime Special CBS Entertainment 1992

== Awards ==
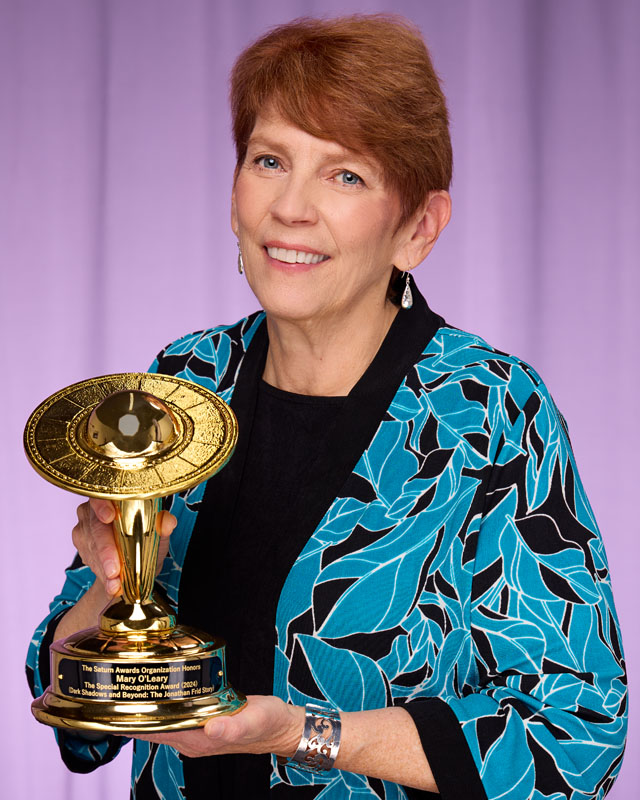
Mary O'Leary receives a 2024 Saturn Award for Dark Shadows and Beyond - The Jonathan Frid Story

O'Leary won the Daytime Emmy Award for Outstanding Drama Series for her work on The Young and the Restless in 2012, 2013, and 2014, and General Hospital in 2004, 2007, and 2011. She also won a special-class award for an hour-long tribute special for the late The Young and the Restless star Jeanne Cooper in 2013. In 2022, Dark Shadows and Beyond – The Jonathan Frid Story was nominated for a Daytime Emmy Award for Outstanding Daytime Special for the 49th Daytime Creative Arts & Lifestyle Emmy Awards. The film also received a 2022 silver Telly Award for Excellence as Online Documentary, as well as additional film awards.

On July 6, 2024 at the Dark Shadows Remembrance Weekend held in Burbank, California, Ms. O’Leary was presented with a Special Recognition Award from the Saturn Awards Organization and the Academy of Science Fiction, Fantasy and Horror Films for Dark Shadows and Beyond – The Jonathan Frid Story.
