= 52nd Daytime Emmy Awards =

- Awarded for: Outstanding achievement in all fields of daytime television
- Presented by: National Academy of Television Arts and Sciences (NATAS)
- Announced on: July 10, 2025
- Date: October 17, 2025
- Site: Pasadena Civic Auditorium; Pasadena, California, U.S.
- Hosted by: Mario Lopez
- Produced by: Adam Sharp (NATAS); Lisa Armstrong (NATAS)
- Official website: theemmys.tv/daytime/

Highlights
- Outstanding Drama Series: General Hospital
- Lifetime achievement: Deborah Norville
- Most awards: General Hospital (7)
- Most nominations: The Young and the Restless (19)

Television coverage
- Network: The Emmys App watch.theemmys.tv

The 52nd Daytime Emmy Awards, presented by the National Academy of Television Arts and Sciences (NATAS), took place on October 17, 2025, at the Pasadena Civic Auditorium in Pasadena, California. During the gala, the NATAS presented Daytime Emmys in 14 categories (Note: This count excludes the categories presented from the 52nd Daytime Creative Arts & Lifestyle Emmy Awards during the same evening.) honoring daytime television in 2024. The ceremony was broadcast via the Emmys app and online at watch.theemmys.tv, after CBS televised the event from 2020 to 2024. American actor and television host Mario Lopez hosted the event for the fourth time, his first as sole host.

In related events, the Academy held its 52nd Daytime Creative Arts & Lifestyle Emmy Awards ceremony on the same evening. General Hospital won a leading seven awards, including Outstanding Drama Series, their fifth consecutive win in the category.

== Winners and nominees ==
The nominees for the 52nd Daytime Emmy Awards were announced on July 10, 2025.

=== Awards ===
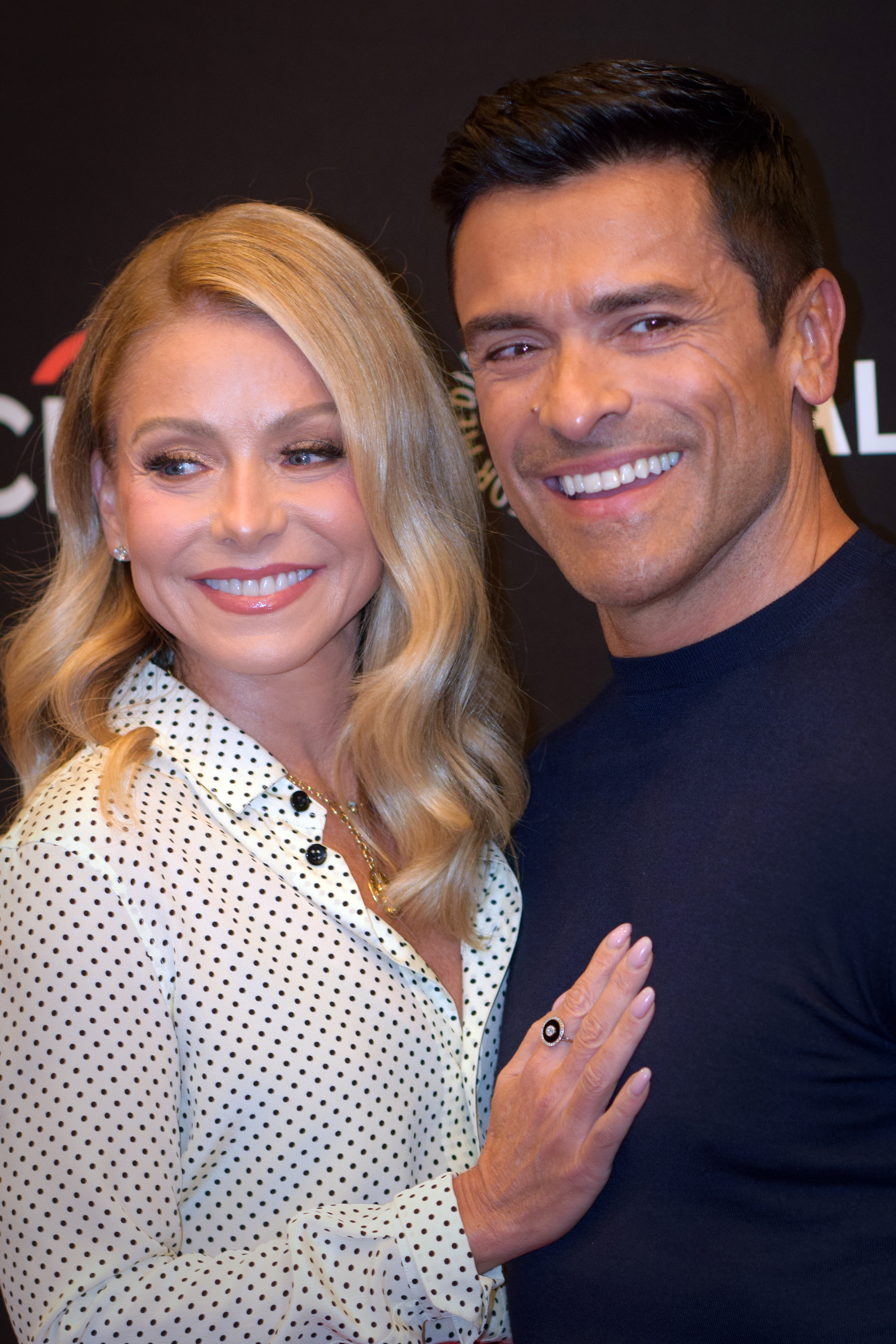
Kelly Ripa (left) and Mark Consuelos (right), hosts of Outstanding Daytime Talk Series winner Live with Kelly and Mark

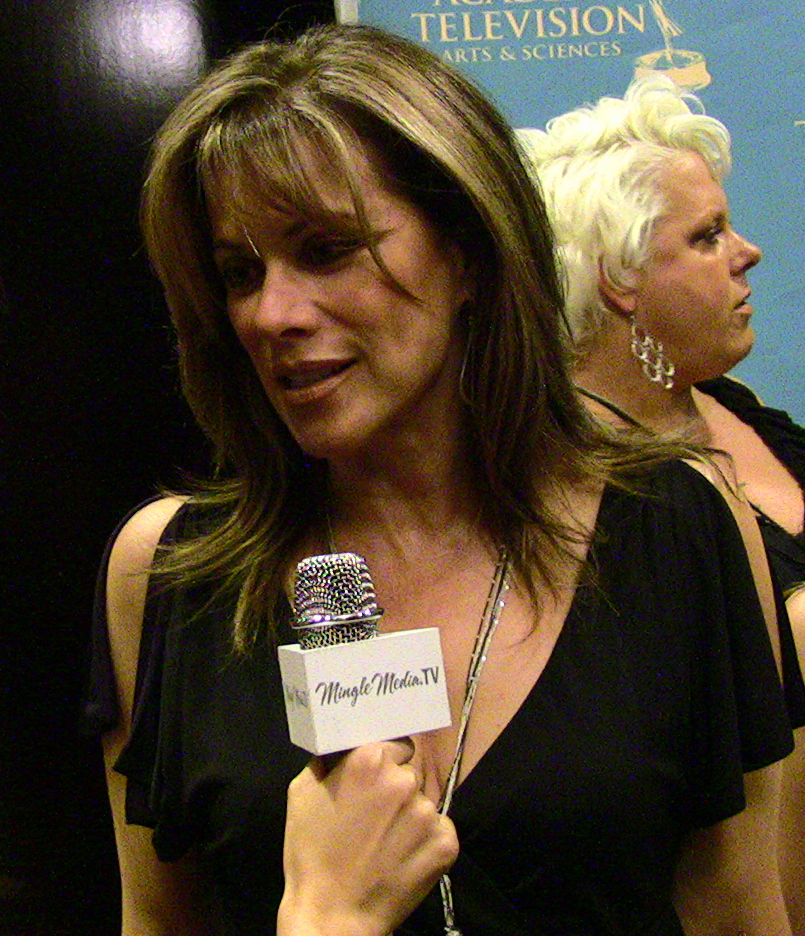
Nancy Lee Grahn, Outstanding Lead Actress in a Drama Series winner

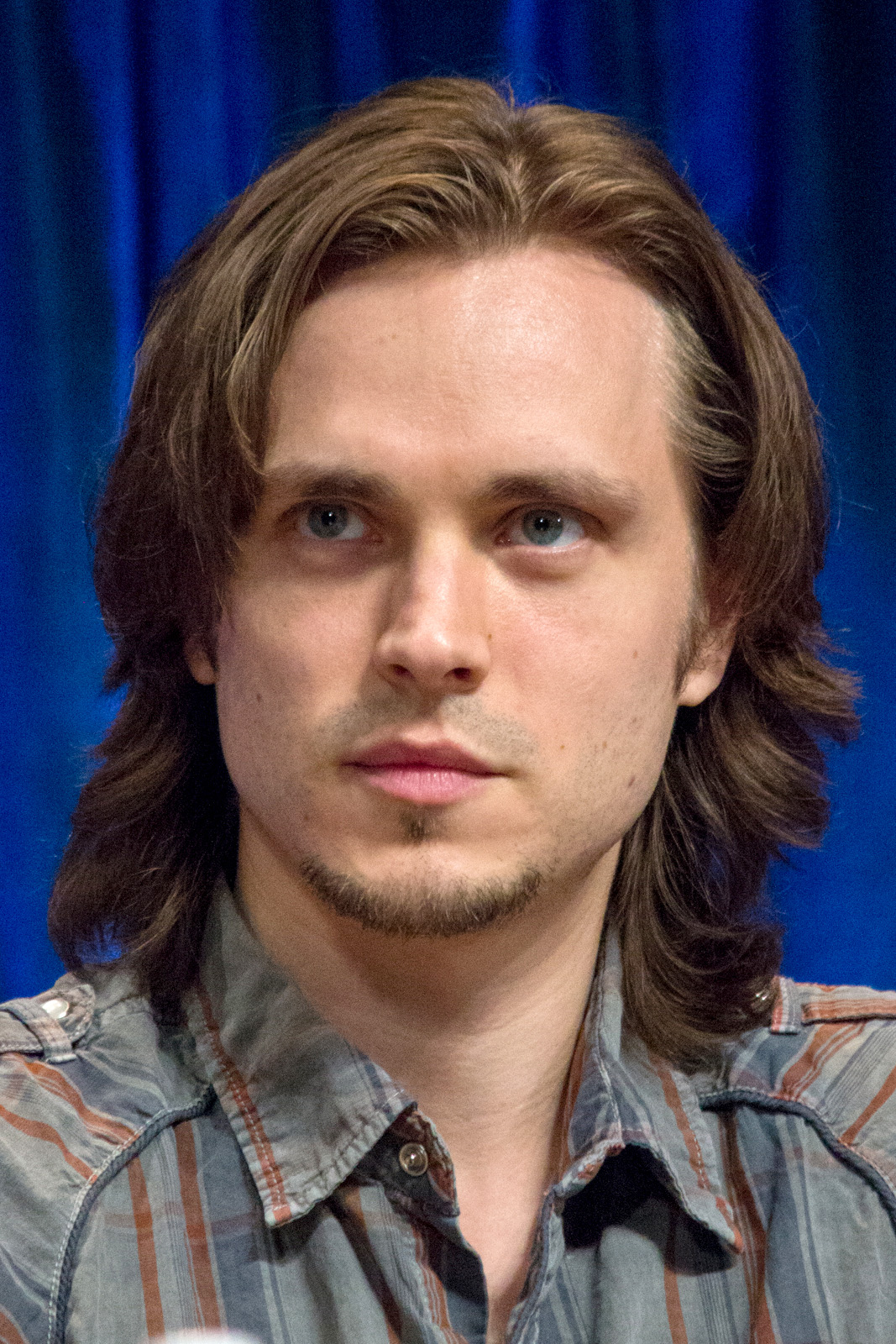
Jonathan Jackson, Outstanding Supporting Actor in a Drama Series winner

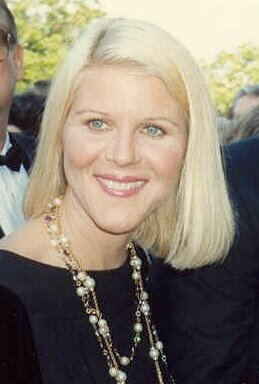
Alley Mills, Outstanding Guest Performer in a Drama Series winner

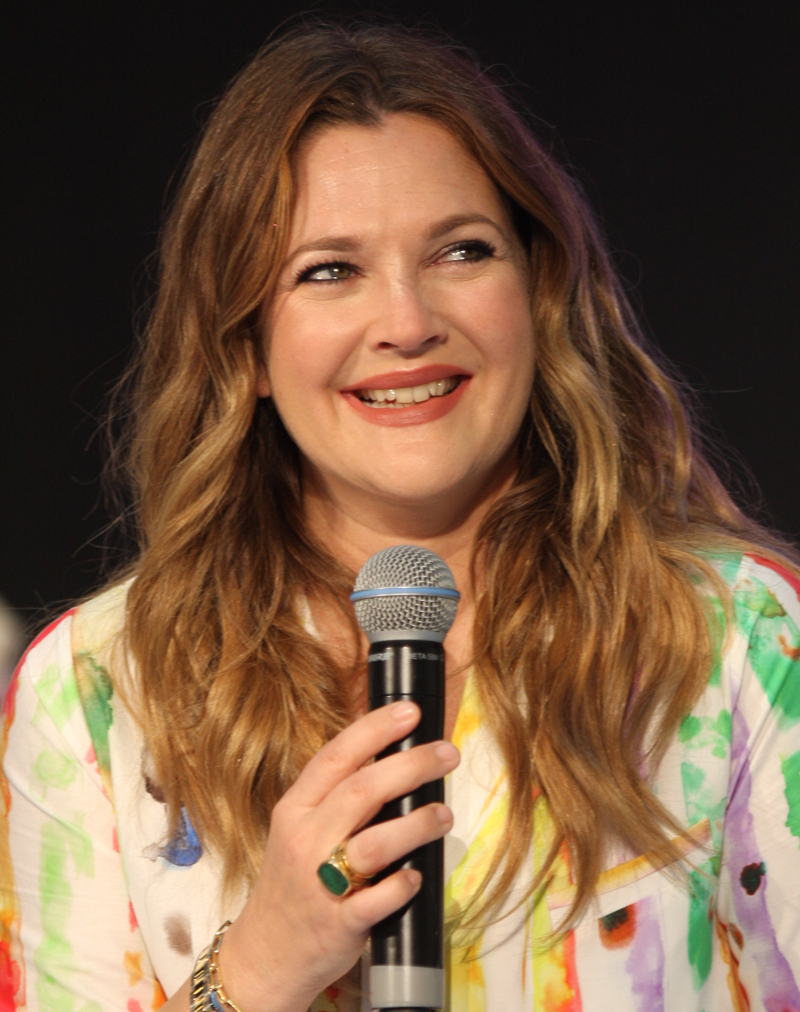
Drew Barrymore, Outstanding Daytime Talk Series Host winner

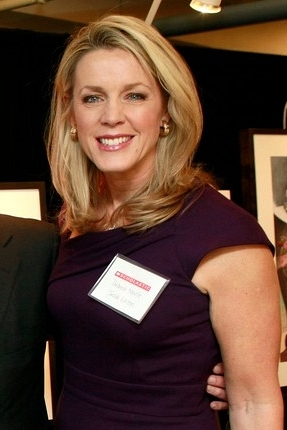
Deborah Norville, Lifetime Achieve Award recipient

Winners are listed first, highlighted in boldface, and indicated with a double dagger (‡).

List of winners and nominees
Category	Winners and nominees
Outstanding Drama Series	**General Hospital** ‡; Days of Our Lives; The Young and the Restless
Outstanding Daytime Talk Series	**Live with Kelly and Mark** ‡; The Drew Barrymore Show; The Jennifer Hudson Show; The Kelly Clarkson Show; The View
Outstanding Entertainment News Series	**Entertainment Tonight** ‡; Access Hollywood; E! News; Extra
Outstanding Culinary Instructional Series	**Delicious Miss Brown** ‡; Be My Guest with Ina Garten; Emeril Cooks; Lidia's Kitchen; Selena + Restaurant
Outstanding Lead Actress in a Drama Series	**Nancy Lee Grahn as Alexis Davis on General Hospital** ‡; Sharon Case as Sharon Newman on The Young and the Restless; Eileen Davidson as Ashley Abbott on The Young and the Restless; Melissa Claire Egan as Chelsea Lawson on The Young and the Restless; Michelle Stafford as Phyllis Summers on The Young and the Restless; Laura Wright as Carly Spencer on General Hospital
Outstanding Lead Actor in a Drama Series	**Paul Telfer as Xander Kiriakis on Days of Our Lives** ‡; Peter Bergman as Jack Abbott on The Young and the Restless; Eric Martsolf as Brady Black on Days of Our Lives; Greg Rikaart as Leo Stark on Days of Our Lives; Dominic Zamprogna as Dante Falconeri on General Hospital
Outstanding Supporting Actress in a Drama Series	**Susan Walters as Diane Jenkins Abbott on The Young and the Restless** ‡; Linsey Godfrey as Sarah Horton on Days of Our Lives; Courtney Hope as Sally Spectra on The Young and the Restless; Kate Mansi as Kristina Corinthos-Davis on General Hospital; Emily O'Brien as Theresa Donovan on Days of Our Lives
Outstanding Supporting Actor in a Drama Series	**Jonathan Jackson as Lucky Spencer on General Hospital** ‡; Tajh Bellow as TJ Ashford on General Hospital; Blake Berris as Everett Lynch on Days of Our Lives; Michael Graziadei as Daniel Romalotti on The Young and the Restless; Gregory Harrison as Gregory Chase on General Hospital
Outstanding Emerging Talent in a Drama Series	**Lisa Yamada as Luna Nozawa on The Bold and the Beautiful** ‡; Olivia d'Abo as Fifi Garrett on The Bay; AnnaLynne McCord as Cat Greene on Days of Our Lives; Ashley Puzemis as Holly Jonas on Days of Our Lives; Christian Weissmann as Remy Pryce on The Bold and the Beautiful
Outstanding Guest Performer in a Drama Series	**Alley Mills as Heather Webber on General Hospital** ‡; Linden Ashby as Cameron Kirsten on The Young and the Restless; Clint Howard as Tom Starr on The Bold and the Beautiful; Jacqueline Grace Lopez as Blaze on General Hospital; Valarie Pettiford as Amy Lewis on The Young and the Restless; Avery Kristen Pohl as Esme Prince on General Hospital
Outstanding Daytime Talk Series Host	**Drew Barrymore – The Drew Barrymore Show** ‡; Jenna Bush Hager and Hoda Kotb – Today with Hoda & Jenna; Kelly Clarkson – The Kelly Clarkson Show; Mark Consuelos and Kelly Ripa – Live with Kelly and Mark; Jennifer Hudson – The Jennifer Hudson Show
Outstanding Daytime Personality – Daily	**Cassie DiLaura, Denny Directo, Kevin Frazier, Nischelle Turner, Rachel Smith – Entertainment Tonight** ‡; Scott Evans, Zuri Hall, Kit Hoover, Mario Lopez – Access Hollywood; Robert Hernandez, Star Jones – Divorce Court; Whitney Kumar, Kevin Rasco, Sarah Rose, Judge Judy Sheindlin – Judy Justice
Outstanding Writing Team for a Drama Series	**General Hospital** ‡; Days of Our Lives; The Young and the Restless
Outstanding Directing Team for a Drama Series	**General Hospital** ‡; Days of Our Lives; The Young and the Restless

=== Lifetime Achievement Award ===
- Deborah Norville

== Programs with multiple nominations ==
Programs with the Most Nominations
Program	Noms	Genre
The Young and the Restless	19	Daytime Drama Series
General Hospital	16	Daytime Drama Series
Days of Our Lives	13	Daytime Drama Series
The Drew Barrymore Show	9	Daytime Talk Series
The Kelly Clarkson Show	8	Daytime Talk Series

== Ceremony information ==
In January 2025, NATAS president Adam Sharp revealed that the 52nd Daytime Emmy Awards would change its scheduling from its traditional May/June date to October, switching places with the 46th News and Documentary Emmy Awards to highlight the "timely nature" of news and documentary programming.

This year, the NATAS strictly enforced a longstanding rule that "in any category where there are fewer than ten (10) submissions, no more than 50% of submitted entries may be nominated". This meant that only three daytime dramas qualified to earn nominations: Days of Our Lives, General Hospital, and The Young and the Restless. The newest daytime drama, Beyond the Gates, was also ineligible due to its February 24, 2025, premiere date, which followed the December 31, 2024, window deadline.

=== Category changes ===
- A new category, Outstanding Emerging Talent in a Daytime Drama Series, honors performers who are in their first two years on their first daytime drama series. Unlike the retired Outstanding Younger Performer in a Drama Series and its gender-specific predecessors, there would be no maximum age limit. However, one who wins it once would be disqualified from winning it a second time.
- Outstanding Culinary Program was divided into two specific categories: Outstanding Culinary Instructional Series honoring those shows more instructive in food preparation and cooking, and Outstanding Culinary Cultural Series honoring those shows focused more on the cultural aspects of food.
- Outstanding Travel, Adventure and Nature Program was divided into two specific categories: Outstanding Travel and Adventure Program honoring those shows focused more on travel, and Outstanding Nature and Science Program honoring those shows focused more on the science of the natural world.

== "In Memoriam" ==
The annual "In Memoriam" segment, was presented by host Lopez. The following individuals were honored during the tribute:

- Denise Alexander
- John Aprea
- Anne Burrell
- John Capodice
- Frank Caprio
- Leslie Charleson
- Thom Christopher
- Patricia Crowley
- Mark Dobies
- Phil Donahue
- Bruce French
- Eileen Fulton
- Helen Gallagher
- Ron Hale
- Wings Hauser
- Alice Hirson
- Drake Hogestyn
- Jim Houghton
- André Landzaat
- Ananda Lewis
- Valerie Mahaffey
- Peter Marshall
- Wink Martindale
- Julian McMahon
- Joe Marinelli
- Wayne Northrop
- Pamela Peters
- Nicholas Pryor
- Chris Robinson
- Tristan Rogers
- Francisco San Martín
- Doug Sheehan
- Richard Simmons
- Esta TerBlanche
- Michelle Trachtenberg
- Chuck Woolery
