= Susan Kirshenbaum =

American screenwriter

Susan Kirshenbaum is an American television writer.

== Positions held ==
- Writer on All My Children; (1983 – 1993), As the World Turns (1995–2000), and Days of Our Lives (2005–2006)

== Awards and nominations ==
Kirshenbaum has been nominated for nine Daytime Emmy awards for her work on All My Children and As the World Turns. She was nominated from 1984 to 2000, and won twice in 1985 and 1988. Her first DE nomination was shared with Agnes Nixon, Wisner Washam, Lorraine Broderick, Dani Morris, Jack Wood, Mary K. Wells, Clarice Blackburn, Elizabeth Wallace, Roni Dengel, and Carlina Della Pietra, while her first win was shared with the former minus Morris and Dengel, and including Victor Miller, Art Wallace, and Elizabeth Page.

She was also nominated for a Writers Guild of America award in the category Daytime Serials in 1998, for her work on As the World Turns. Her nomination was shared with Addie Walsh, Mel Brez, Stephen Demorest, Lisa Connor, Patti DiZenzo, Ralph Ellis, John Kuntz, Mary Sue Price, Louise Shaffer, and Melissa Salmons.
