= Art Wallace =

American television writer

Art Wallace was an American television writer best known for his work on the gothic soap opera Dark Shadows. He began work in television in the 1940s, on the anthology series Studio One and Kraft Television Theater. Over the years, Wallace wrote for Tom Corbett, Space Cadet, Combat!, Star Trek, and many other shows. The teleplay on which Dark Shadows was based was called "The House" and was an episode of the anthology series Goodyear Playhouse in 1957.When Dan Curtis had the idea for Dark Shadows, he offered the job of producer to Art Wallace, who declined the job. Wallace offered to write the show and recommended Robert Costello for the job of producer. In 1966, working with Dan Curtis he wrote the bible and first eight weeks' worth of early episodes of Dark Shadows. He wrote the next nine weeks of shows alternating with film writer Francis Swann.

Wallace was also a story consultant for the soap opera All My Children. His wife, Elizabeth Wallace, was a script writer on AMC during the 1980s.

Art Wallace was also the author of "Toby" which was used as reading material in elementary schools throughout the seventies and eighties, and less frequently up to today. "Toby" was re-released with new cover art as "Toby and the Phantoms of the Fourth Grade" just after his death.

He died in 1994.

== Filmography ==
=== Films ===
Year	Film	Credit	Notes
1960	The Valley Of Decision	Screenplay By	
1970	Toby	Written By	Television Movie
1971	Dr. Cook's Garden	Screenplay By	Television Movie, Based on the play by "Ira Levin"
1971	A Tattered Web	Written By	Television Movie
1972	She Waits	Written By	Television Movie
1977	The World of Darkness	Written By	
1978	The World Beyond	Written By, Executive Production Consultant	
1980	Forgotten City of the Planet of the Apes	Screenplay By	
1980	Back to the Planet of the Apes	Screenplay By	
1981	Charlie and the Great Balloon Chase	Written By	Television Film
1997	Calculated Risk	Written By	

=== Television ===
Year	TV Series	Credit	Notes
1948	Studio One in Hollywood	Writer	
1950	Tom Corbett, Space Cadet	Writer	
1953-54	The Web	Writer	8 episodes
1955-56	Justice	Writer	4 episodes
1955-56	Appointment with Adventure	Writer	4 episodes
1956	The Man Called X	Writer	1 Episode
1956-60	Armstrong Circle Theatre	Writer	12 episodes
1957	Men of Annapolis	Writer	1 Episode
1957	The Kaiser Aluminum Hour	Writer	1 Episode
1957	Goodyear Television Playhouse	Writer	1 Episode
1957	The New Adventures of Martin Kane	Writer	1 Episode
1957	Harbormaster	Writer	1 Episode
1957	Captain David Grief	Writer	1 Episode
1958	Kraft Television Theatre	Writer	1 Episode
1960-61	Hong Kong	Writer, producer, Associate Producer	
1961-62	Adventures in Paradise	Producer	15 episodes
1962	Follow the Sun	Producer	1 Episode
1962-63	Combat!	Writer	2 episodes
1962-63	Sam Benedict	Writer	2 episodes
1962-64	The Doctors and The Nurses	Writer, Story Consultant	
1964	Espionage	Writer	1 Episode
1964	The Lieutenant	Writer	1 Episode
1964	Brenner	Writer	1 Episode
1965	For The People	Writer	2 episodes
1965	The Wackiest Ship in The Army	Writer	1 Episode
1966-71	Dark Shadows	Developer, Writer, Creator	Multiple Episodes
1967	Coronet Blue	Writer	1 Episode
1967	Felony Squad	Writer	1 Episode
1967	The Invaders	Writer	1 Episode
1967-68	Star Trek	Writer	2 episodes
1970-71	The Bill Cosby Show	Writer	4 episodes
1973	The ABC Afternoon Playbreak	Writer	2 episodes
1974	Planet of The Apes	Writer	2 episodes
1975	Space: 1999	Writer	1 Episode
1977	Little Vic	Writer	1 Episode
1978	CBS Afternoon Playhouse	Writer	5 episodes
1985	All My Children	Story Consultant	
1989	Nightmare Classics	Writer	1 Episode
