= Randy Robbins (director) =

American film director (??–2015)

Randy J. Robbins (died May 18, 2015, in San Diego) was an American director.

== Directing credits ==
- The Young and the Restless (as Randy J. Robbins; 1985–1995)
- Days of Our Lives (1995–2003)

== Awards and nominations ==
- Directors Guild of America Award

Nomination, 2002, for Outstanding Directorial Achievement in Daytime Serials

- Daytime Emmy Award

His first Emmy win was shared with Dennis Steinmetz, Rudy Vejar, Frank Pacelli and Betty Rothenberg.

Won, 1987, 1988, 1989, 1986, for Outstanding Drama Series Directing Team
Nomination, 1987-1996, 1998, 1999, 2003, for Outstanding Drama Series Directing Team
