= Kathleen Klein =

American television writer

Kathleen Klein is an American television writer.

== Staff writer ==
- All My Children (Hired by Wisner Washam; 1987– 1993, 1995–1999)
- Another World (1993-1994)
- Loving (1994)
- Guiding Light (1994-1995)

== Awards and nominations ==
- Writers Guild of America Award

Nomination, 1996, 1998, 2000 for Daytime Serials
Won, 1997, for Daytime Serials
Won, 1999, for Daytime Serials

- Daytime Emmy Award

Won, 1988, for Outstanding Drama Series Writing Team
Nomination, 1990 - 1994, 1999; for Outstanding Drama Series Writing Team
Won, 1996 - 1998; for Outstanding Drama Series Writing Team
