= Giovanni Mazza (entertainer) =

American entertainer

- Born: May 22, 2005 (age 21)
- Occupations: Musician; actor
- Musical career
- Instruments: Violin
- Years active: 2014–present

Giovanni Mazza (born May 22, 2005) is an American violinist and actor.

== Career ==
=== Violinist ===
Mazza was discovered in the Chicago Bulls Youth Talent Search when he performed a solo violin medley in 2015 at age 9. He began playing the violin at age 3 and began acting at age 7. He has performed solo violin at a wide range of venues including NBA All-Star Games, Major League Baseball games, over 100 National Basketball Association (NBA) games at venues such as Staples Center, United Center, and Madison Square Garden and numerous other events. At age 10, he performed at halftime of the Rising Stars Challenge at the 2016 NBA All-Star Game.

On April 25, 2026, Mazza performed a violin version of Michael Jackson’s Smooth Criminal at a Los Angeles Lakers playoff game. On May 2, 2026, he performed A Whole New World before the May 4 crossover with Michael James Scott of Aladdin on General Hospital.

=== Acting ===
Mazza has appeared on Bella and the Bulldogs. In May 2024, he made his debut on General Hospital, where he plays Giovanni Palmieri. In July 2026, Mazza received a Daytime Emmy Award nomination for his role in the Outstanding Emerging Talent in a Daytime Drama Series category. In 2025, Mazza was in the semi-autobiographical anthology drama film Sunfish (& Other Stories on Green Lake) directed by Sierra Falconer.

== Filmography ==
=== Film ===
Year	Title	Role	Director(s)	Notes
2013	Baggage	Jason	Nicholas Ray Hernandez	Short film
2014	Saving John Murphy	John Murphy Jr.	Christopher He	Short film
2015	Paracosm	Man as Boy	Wade Balsamo	Short film
2015	Farewell, Charlie	Alex	John Lerchen	Short film
2016	First String	Giovanni	Dean Christakis	Musical drama film
2016	One Tough Cookie	Ferris	Hadeel Hadidi	Short film
2018	For Ian	Ian	Mark Reinholtz; David Rivera	Short film
2025	Sunfish (& Other Stories on Green Lake)	Enzo	Sierra Falconer	Semi-autobiographical anthology drama film

=== Television ===
Year	Title	Role	Notes
2015	Bella and the Bulldogs	Young Charlie	Episode: "Dudes & Chicks"
2024	Chicago Fire	Noah	Episode: "The Little Things"
2024–present	General Hospital	Giovanni Palmieri	Contract role
2025	Power Book IV: Force	Other student	Episode: "Do or Die"

=== Music videos ===
Year	Title	Role	Director	Notes
2018	Evaporate	Himself	Ryan Hutchins	

== Awards and nominations ==
List of awards and nominations
Year	Award	Category	Work	Result	Ref.
2026	Daytime Emmy Award	Outstanding Emerging Talent in a Daytime Drama Series	General Hospital	Nominated	
