= Frank Pacelli =

American actor, director and producer (1924–1997)

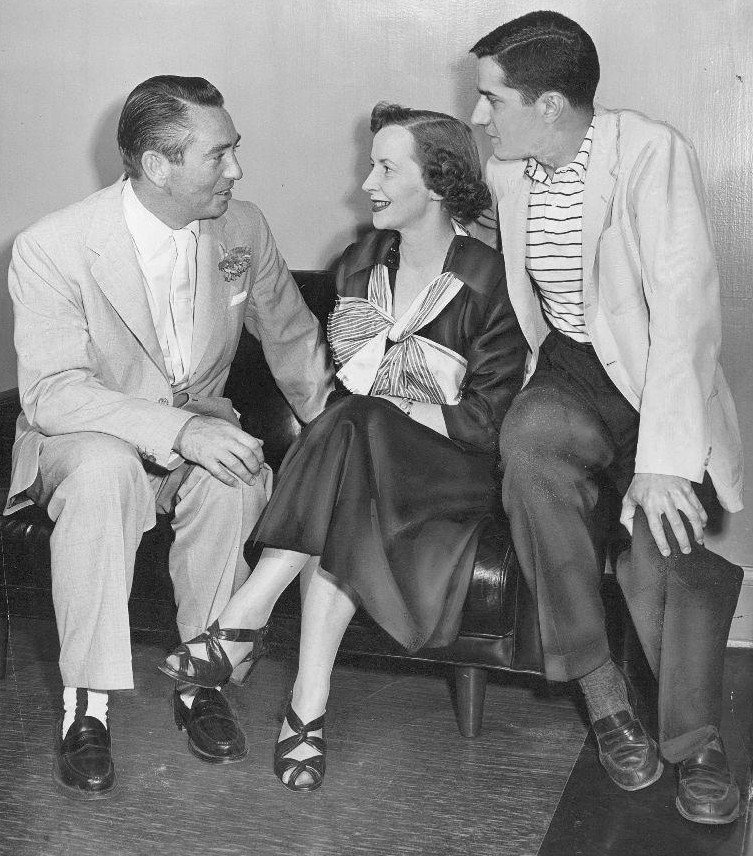
- Frank Pacelli (right), director of TV daytime drama Hawkins Falls, in 1953 with the show's stars, Macdonald Carey and Bernardine Flynn
- Born: August 23, 1924; Chicago, Illinois, United States
- Died: March 7, 1997 (aged 72); Los Angeles, California, United States
- Other name: Frankie Pacelli
- Education: University of Illinois
- Occupations: Director, actor

Frank Timothy Pacelli (August 23, 1924 — March 7, 1997) was an American child actor, on radio and the stage, and later a television director and producer.

== Early life and career ==
Born in Chicago on August 13, 1924, Pacelli was one of six children born to immigrants Antonia "Antoinette" (née Sabbia) and Vito Pacelli. Alongside fellow Chicagoan Mel Torme, he attended the dramatic school directed by Marie Agnes Foley. Pacelli later attended the University of Illinois, where he performed wth the Illini Theatre Guild, and where, following his graduation, he served as that company's general manager, while continuing to perform, most notably as Tom Wingfield in The Glass Menagerie, and as Leonid Andreieveitch Gayev in Chekhov's The Cherry Orchard.

In 1940, Pacelli portrayed the 10-year-old Abe Lincoln in a summer stock production of Lillian Beynon Thomas's As the Twig Is Bent.. Later that year, he was heard as Lincoln's son Robert, alongside Raymond Massey's Lincoln on Cavalcade of America.

The April 11, 1945 issue of ''Variety featured a full-page ad taken out by the producers of Du Pont's Cavalcade of America in which Pacelli was one of the "344 women and men whose effort and performance in 1944 have brought a signal honor to Du Pont's radio program".

Pacelli was the producer of NBC Children's Theatre. Programs that he directed included NBC Children's Theatre, Watch Mr. Wizard, Bright Promise, Hawkins Falls,Dark Shadows, Days of Our Lives, Morning Star, Return to Peyton Place, The Young Marrieds, The Bold and the Beautiful, and The Young and the Restless (hired by William J. Bell) 1982–1995.

== Awards and nominations ==
Pacelli was nominated for thirteen Daytime Emmy Awards in the categories Outstanding Direction for a Drama Series and Outstanding Drama Series Directing Team, for his work on Days of Our Lives and The Young and the Restless. He was nominated from 1979 to 1997, and won six times in 1986, 1987, 1988, 1989, 1996, and 1997. He was also nominated for a Directors Guild of America award for Outstanding Directorial Achievement in Daytime Serials in 1998, for his work on Y&R. His first DE win was shared with Dennis Steinmetz, Rudy Vejar, Randy Robbins and Betty Rothenberg.

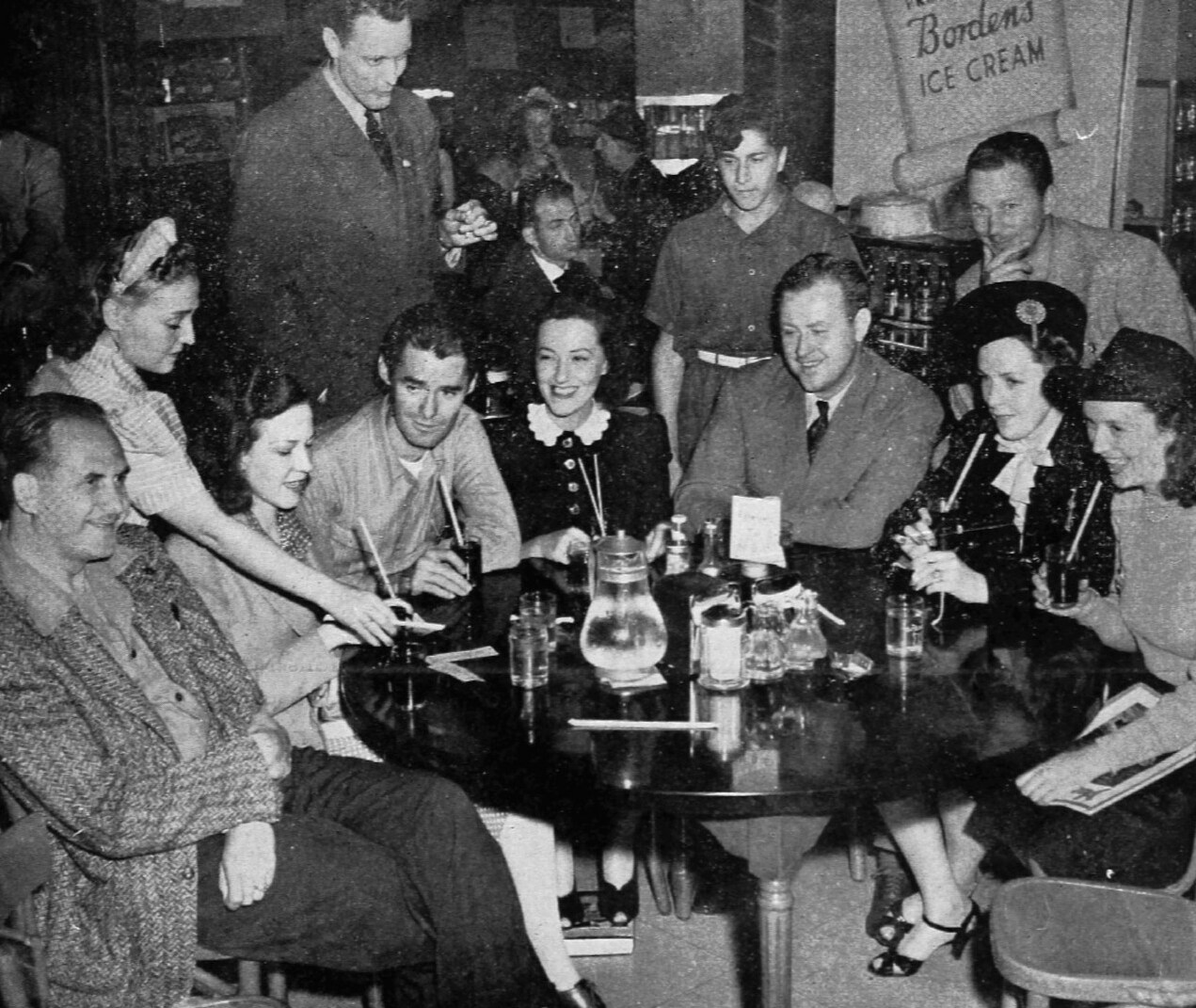
Frank Pacelli (credited as Frankie Pacelli, back row, standing in the middle) in January 1941 with the cast of NBC radio soap opera Girl Alone.

== Death ==
Pacelli died on March 7, 1997, in Los Angeles at the age of 72, survived by a bother and two sisters. A memorial service was held on Monday evening, March 17, at CBS Television City.

== Critical response ==
In a review of the 1964 Robin Hood episode of The Children's Theater in The New York Times, Jack Gould wrote, "Mr. Pacelli's direction had marvelous effects that repeatedly implemented the humor, and his scene transitions were as smooth and inventive as anything seen on TV for some time."
