= Meredith Post =

American television writer

Meredith Post is an American television writer. When Douglas Marland died in 1993, she was in the running to become head writer of ATWT. That title went to Juliet Law Packer and Richard Backus.

== Positions held ==
As the World Turns

- Writer (1983–1997)

Days of Our Lives

- Writer (October 1999 – April 2000, January 21, 2002 – February 22, 2002)

== Awards and nominations ==
Post has been nominated for six Daytime Emmy awards, in the category Outstanding Drama Series Writing Team, for her work on Days of Our Lives and As the World Turns. She was nominated from 1986 to 1999.

She also won the 2000 Writers Guild of America Award in the Daytime Serials category, for her work on DOOL.
