= Caroline Franz =

American television writer

Caroline Franz is an American television writer.

== Career ==
After graduating with a master's degree from the Columbia University Graduate School of Journalism in 1976, Ms. Franz began her daytime career as a writer for 'All My Children' (1977 - 1983). In 1983, she was named headwriter of "As The World Turns." In 1984, she became headwriter of 'Search for Tomorrow", but then returned as a scriptwriter to "As The World Turns" in 1985, where she remained until 1995. In 1997, Ms. Franz returned to "All My Children" as a scriptwriter, where she remained until 2000 after winning an Emmy award (following 13 nominations) for Outstanding Writing of a Daytime Serial. She worked with two legendary writers, Agnes Nixon and Douglas Marland.

== Awards and nominations ==
She has received 13 Daytime Emmy and 4 WGA Award nominations. She has won 1 Emmy and 2 WGA Awards. .
