= Elizabeth Wallace (writer) =

American writer

Elizabeth Wallace is an American television writer primarily known for her work on the soap opera All My Children. She was married to Art Wallace.

== Writing credits ==
Title	Years in production	Credited as	Number of episodes worked on
Loving	1985	Writer	7 episodes
One Life to Live	1987	Writer	3 episodes
Another World	1986-1989	Writer/scriptwriter	12 episodes
All My Children	1981-1990	Written by, writer	472 episodes

== Awards and nominations ==
Wallace has received multiple Daytime Emmy Award nominations for her work on the soap opera All My Children. She received five nominations between 1982 and 1988 and won two awards in 1985 and 1988.

Her first nomination was shared with a group of individuals, including Agnes Nixon, Wisner Washam, Jack Wood, Mary K. Wells, Clarice Blackburn, Lorraine Broderick, Cynthia Benjamin, and John Saffron. Her first win included most of the same individuals, with the exception of Benjamin and Saffron, and also included Victor Miller, Art Wallace, Susan Kirshenbaum, Elizabeth Page, and Carlina Della Pietra.
