= Maria Wagner =

Maria Wagner is an American television soap opera director and writer.

== Directing credits ==
As the World Turns

- Director (1984–2010)
- Breakdown Writer (January 2008 – March 2008)

== Awards and nominations ==
Daytime Emmy Award

- Win, 2007 & 1993, Directing, As the World Turns
- Nomination, 1985–1990, 1992, 1995, 2001–2003, Directing, As the World Turns
