= Betty Rothenberg =

American television and theatre director

Betty Rothenberg is an American television and theatre director. She directed The Young and the Restless episodes from 1984 to 2002.

== Awards and nominations ==
Daytime Emmy
1986, 1987, 1988, 1989, 1996, 1997, 1998, 1999, 2001, 2002: Won for The Young and the Restless
1990,1991, 1992, 1993, 1994, 1995, 2000: Nominated for The Young and the Restless

Directors Guild of America (DGA)
1997: Won for The Young and the Restless

== Television credits ==
- On Location: George Carlin at Phoenix: assistant to producer (1978)
- The Young and the Restless: associate director/director (1984–2002)
