= Wisner Washam =

American soap opera writer (born 1931)

Wisner McCamey Washam (born September 8, 1931) is an American soap opera writer, best known as the head writer of All My Children, from 1981 to 1987.

== Early life and career ==
A native of North Carolina, he graduated from the University of North Carolina at Chapel Hill. After working in local television and radio in Charlotte, he moved to London where he studied acting at the London Academy of Music and Dramatic Art. From there, he returned to New York where he worked for four seasons with the American Shakespeare Festival in Connecticut and on national tour.

Off-Broadway he was stage manager for The Fantasticks, The White Devil, and The House of Blue Leaves. He toured the US as stage manager for Victor Borge, then worked with Mike Todd's America Be Seated as well as The Birds and The Orestea in the Ypsilanti Greek Festival. On Broadway he was understudy and stage manager in Neil Simon's Star-Spangled Girl, Plaza Suite (he also assisted Mike Nichols in directing the national tour), The Prisoner of Second Avenue, There's A Girl in My Soup, and The Riot Act.

== All My Children ==
He was groomed by All My Children creator Agnes Nixon to take the reins in the 1980s while she focused on other endeavors. From 1981-83, he shared head writing duties with Nixon, and from 1986-87, was co-head writer with Lorraine Broderick. Washam took a break from the show for nearly three years, but returned in time for its 20th anniversary.

From 1989-92, Washam served as Associate Head Writer (alongside Broderick through 1991, followed by Megan McTavish), with Nixon head writing the show. Washam chose to leave All My Children once again, upon McTavish's ascension to the head writing post.

== Later career ==
After leaving All My Children Washam worked in Paris while assisting development of the European soap opera which eventually aired as Riviera. He created the concept for a new Fox primetime soap, and was also involved in the development of a German soap opera, Take Your Chance. He has written both a screenplay and a novel entitled The Cloning which has been modified under the title "Has The Pope Lost His Marbles?" His second novel is "Edie's Story." His latest publication is a potpourri of his writings entitled "Scribbles." All are available on Amazon.com in paperback and Kindle. Washam won a Daytime Emmy Award for Outstanding Writing Team as All My Children's co-head writer alongside Nixon in 1985, and another with Broderick in 1988. His third daytime Emmy was in 1993 with CBS's "The Guiding Light."

== Personal life ==
Washam married soap opera and Broadway actress Judith Barcroft on June 15, 1969. They have a son named Ian Miller Washam (who played Little Phillip Brent on All My Children in the 1970s) and a daughter, Amy Washam Masterson, and three granddaughters.

== Awards and nominations ==
Daytime Emmy Awards

WINS

- (1985 & 1988; Best Writing; All My Children)
- (1993; Best Writing; Guiding Light)

NOMINATIONS

- (1976, 1977, 1978, 1979, 1980, 1981, 1982, 1983, 1984, 1990, 1991 & 1992; Best Writing; All My Children)

Writers Guild of America Award

NOMINATIONS

- (1991 & 1992 seasons; All My Children)
