= List of Everybody Hates Chris characters =

This is a list of the main characters in the Emmy-nominated TV series Everybody Hates Chris and the animated reboot Everybody Still Hates Chris. The fictional family is loosely based upon that of actor/comedian Chris Rock.

== Main characters ==
=== Chris Rock ===
Chris Rock
- Everybody Hates Chris and Everybody Still Hates Chris character
- First appearance: "Everybody Hates the Pilot" (2005)
- Created by: Chris Rock; Ali LeRoi
- Portrayed by: Tyler James Williams
- Voiced by: Tim Johnson Jr. (Everybody Still Hates Chris)

In-universe information
- Nicknames: Little Dude from Across the Street, Chrissy The Black, DJ Chrissy Chris, Juicy Fruit, Mr. Cool, Swish, Short Bus, That Black Kid
- Gender: Male
- Occupation: Grocery store clerk, football team manager, student
- Relatives: Julius (father), Rochelle Rock(mother), Drew (brother), Tonya Rock (sister)

Christopher Julius "Chris" Rock III (played by Tyler James Williams and voiced by Tim Johnson Jr.), is the ambitious, responsible, intelligent, and kind-hearted, but troubled, unlucky, unpopular, untalented, nonathletic, underachieving, hapless, awkward, nerdy, vulnerable and put-upon eldest child and protagonist of the series. He wishes he was more like his younger brother, Drew (handsome, lucky, talented - or anything positive). Regardless of whether Chris possesses any positive traits, he's certainly never treated as if he does (being disliked by the opposite race or the opposite gender, unlike his siblings). He tries hard to fit in with his peers and make his family proud, but often finds himself a victim of circumstance due to his desperate methods of doing such. Chris is bullied during his time at Corleone (with little protection obtained from teachers or faculty members), frequently blackmailed and thrown under the bus by his sister, one upped and mate poached by his brother, singled out by the racist teaching staff, rejected and sometimes friendzoned by girls (most of whom Drew ends up taking), robbed by neighborhood thugs, is underpaid at work and is given excessive discipline and backseat treatment by his parents. As the eldest child, he is often put in charge of his younger siblings, but they usually disobey him and he usually has to take the blame for them courtesy of their overexpecting parents who force Chris’s to be 10 years older than he is. Next to all this, Chris is the butt of the last jokes in almost every episode. People just seem to hate him for inexplicable reasons. His luck does improve as the series progresses. One of his talents is playing Asteroids and the other is calling basketball games. As he gets older, Chris becomes interested in stand-up comedy and begins telling jokes in school and upon starting high school at Tattaglia, he is far less often bullied or antagonized by anyone but Joey Caruso and his friends. At the end of the series – after being told that he has to repeat the tenth grade for constantly being late for school – he drops out and gets his GED, though his narrator dropped out due to bullying. He later grows up to be a rich and famous comedian.

=== Julius Rock ===
Julius Rock
- Everybody Hates Chris and Everybody Still Hates Chris character
- First appearance: "Everybody Hates the Pilot" (2005)
- Created by: Chris Rock; Ali LeRoi
- Portrayed by: Terry Crews
- Voiced by: Terry Crews

In-universe information
- Nicknames: Herc, Big Man
- Gender: Male
- Occupation: Newspaper delivery man, security guard, cab driver, fish packager
- Spouse: Rochelle (wife)
- Children: Chris (son), Drew (son), Tonya (daughter)
- Relatives: Louis (brother); Ryan (brother); Pete (brother), Gene (father-in-law, deceased), Maxine (mother-in-law), Mike (brother-in-law), Charlotte (sister-in-law)

Christopher Julius Rock II (played by Terry Crews), based on Chris Rock's father, is Rochelle's cheap, frugal, worrisome, levelheaded, and devoted husband and the father of Chris, Tonya, and Drew. Julius loves sports having been seen watching bowling, baseball, golf, football, and basketball. He admitted that it always killed him that Chris was no good at sports after being excited when he heard that Chris was on the basketball team. He is known for his extreme cheapness and taking the easy way out when it comes to purchasing essential items for his family (such as by using food-stamps and buying store-brands). Julius's cheapness is also exhibited by how he uses duct tape to fix anything and everything broken in the house. He has even been shown to memorize the price of nearly every object in his family's possession, shouting it out loud when such an item has been wasted or ruined. Two of his most famous character attributes are bargaining his way out of having to pay full price for an item and mentioning how much an item costs. He coddles Tonya and is more likely than his wife to give her what she wants, and will react with a lecture every time one of his children considers quitting or asks him about receiving money. Said lectures having been known to last for hours on end and encourage his kids to avoid bringing up such subjects around him. Julius is also shown to be a workaholic, accepting any job offer he receives. It's implied that Julius can understand Mandarin but cannot speak it due to the fact that when he communicates with Mr. Fong, (who speaks in Mandarin towards him) he is able to respond back. Whenever Chris has a problem, he goes to Julius, who gives him advice in a confusing manner. Once, Chris remarked that even though he didn't understand what his father said, it made him feel better anyway. He dies in 1988.

=== Rochelle ===
Rochelle
- Everybody Hates Chris and Everybody Still Hates Chris character
- First appearance: "Everybody Hates the Pilot" (2005)
- Created by: Chris Rock; Ali LeRoi
- Portrayed by: Tichina Arnold
- Voiced by: Tichina Arnold

In-universe information
- Nickname: Chelle
- Gender: Female
- Occupation: Secretary, beautician, waitress, realtor, store worker, shoe saleswoman, cosmetics saleswoman
- Spouse: Julius (husband)
- Children: Chris (son), Drew (son), Tonya (daughter)
- Relatives: Michael (brother), Gene (father, deceased), Maxine (mother), Charlotte (sister), Mousey (aunt), Louis (brother-in-law), Ryan (brother-in-law), Pete (brother-in-law)

Rochelle (played by Tichina Arnold) is Julius's hot-headed, snobbish, sometimes entitled, very humorously cheeky wife and is the strict, disciplinarian, but loving mother of Chris, Tonya, and Drew. She is a self-centered woman who frequently becomes apprehensive over things that often have nothing to do with the current subject matter (such as her kids having babies or selling drugs). She is noted for the saucy comebacks that she uses to put a stop to any complaints that her children might have. She uses the comebacks to ensure that they do not end up performing a crime or great misdeed of some sort; she also fears that they may wind up as street criminals or teenage parents. The narrator describes her as a "Ghetto Snob", likely because of her cautious behavior towards the way her family is perceived in public. She shares loving moments with her children. She also has a passion for chocolate Turtles, which often calm her, and experiences symptoms of withdrawal whenever she must sacrifice them for whatever reason. She is also noted for getting a job, and then quitting whenever she has a problem with it. Rochelle's famous catchphrase that refers to this running gag is: "I don't need this, my man has two jobs!" This expresses her reliance on Julius's two jobs as an excuse to resign and be comfortable at home. She is very judgmental towards Julius when it comes to their marriage. This can be seen in the episodes where she starts to think that Julius will leave her for a white woman or finds something which leads her to believe that Julius is having an affair. She sometimes disagrees to Julius's methods about being cheap, like when they celebrated Kwanzaa instead of Christmas. Julius believes that this method is an effective way to save money for more important things rather than materialistic items. There are times where Rochelle understands Julius's behavior, like in the episode where he got a second job in order to earn more money for the family. However, Rochelle eventually developed second thoughts about the situation, for she believed that Julius was actually throwing money away. From the last part of the second season and the whole of third season, she worked at the New York Department of Records. In the final season of the series, Rochelle works as a beautician at Nessa's Beauty Salon, where in previous seasons she would often get her hair done. She also gossips with her friend and owner of the salon, Vanessa (Jackée Harry) and the other workers. Another running gag about her is that she regularly threatens her children with impossible physical damages but never hits them. The only times she disciplines her children is when she tells them "we need to talk" and takes them to their room.

=== Drew ===
Drew
- Everybody Hates Chris and Everybody Still Hates Chris character
- First appearance: "Everybody Hates the Pilot" (2005)
- Created by: Chris Rock; Ali LeRoi
- Portrayed by: Tequan Richmond
- Voiced by: Terrence Little Gardenhigh (Everybody Still Hates Chris)

In-universe information
- Nickname: My Baby Boy
- Gender: Male
- Occupation: Student, grocery store clerk, traffic boy
- Relatives: Julius (father), Tonya (sister), Rochelle (mother), Chris (brother)

Andrew "Drew" Rock (played by Tequan Richmond, voiced by Terrence Little Gardenhigh) is Chris's popular, lucky, talented, athletic, female-attracting, academic, and handsome younger brother. As opposed to the malicious rejection and harassment Chris receives from his peers, Drew is idolized above all of his classmates. His supreme charm earned him a multitude of girlfriends in the past. Secretly, Chris envies the limitless amount of luck and talent possessed by his younger brother, who appears slightly older than he does. Drew's height as opposed to that of Chris provides his elder brother with a number of disadvantages. Incredibly, Drew looks up to Chris and envies all the responsibility and trust their parents give him. Highly athletic, Drew loves hockey and idolizes Wayne Gretzky. He is also shown to be interested in magic and karate. Drew also has the talent of copying things he sees off of television, especially karate movies. He becomes more responsible and more hardworking as the series progresses. "Wasn't me" is a familiar catchphrase of his, often to get himself out of any possible trouble he is sure he had nothing to do with. In one episode, the narrator even claims that this was his first phrase as a baby. This was first introduced in the Pilot episode.

=== Tonya ===
Tonya
- Everybody Hates Chris and Everybody Still Hates Chris character
- First appearance: "Everybody Hates the Pilot" (2005)
- Created by: Chris Rock; Ali LeRoi
- Portrayed by: Imani Hakim
- Voiced by: Ozioma Akagha (Everybody Still Hates Chris)

In-universe information
- Gender: Female
- Occupation: Student
- Family: Julius (father), Rochelle (mother), Drew (brother), Chris (brother)

Tonya (played by Imani Hakim, voiced by Ozioma Akagha) is Chris and Drew's spoiled, smart-mouthed, shrewd, whiny, bratty and obnoxious younger sister who is based on Chris Rock's real sister, Andi Rock. She enjoys getting her brothers in trouble by whining to her parents about things they never actually did, and Julius and Rochelle always believe her. However, in the third and fourth seasons, she tends to hold a soft spot for Drew and Chris (when Chris got thrown out of the house, she admitted she doesn't want him gone and she and Drew try to rethink Chris's and her mother's decisions) by charging money to keep her mouth shut if they do something wrong (particularly to Chris), and sometimes hangs around Drew. Billy Ocean is her favorite entertainer (though later on she adopts a fondness for Danny Glover), and telling by the way Tonya believes that he originally was responsible for the invention of the Moonwalk instead of Michael Jackson, she might not like to believe what she does not want to believe. Julius cares for Tonya and is usually the parent apt to give her what she wants, whereas Rochelle is normally not afraid to not provide Tonya with one of her desires if it is for something she is unwilling to give to her daughter, and worries that one mistake in raising her will be linked to her being pregnant one day, and she "ain't raisin' no babies". She is usually given nice gifts from the neighborhood kids; for example, James (one of her admirers) bought her a car in one episode.

=== Greg ===
Greg Wulliger
- Everybody Hates Chris and Everybody Still Hates Chris character
- First appearance: "Everybody Hates the Pilot" (2005)
- Created by: Chris Rock; Ali LeRoi
- Portrayed by: Vincent Martella
- Voiced by: Gunnar Sizemore (Everybody Still Hates Chris)

In-universe information
- Gender: Male
- Occupation: Student
- Relatives: Art Wuliger (father)

Gregory "Greg" Wuliger (portrayed by Vincent Martella, voiced by Gunnar Sizemore) is Chris's weird, nerdy, negative self-talking, dimwitted and anxious best friend. He is one of the only kids at Corleone Junior High who doesn't hate Chris. He himself is almost as unpopular as Chris. Chris always comes to Greg for advice, even though Greg is usually terrible at coming up with solutions. Despite being Chris's best and only friend, Greg is always quick to abandon Chris when bullies come in order to save himself and also has disagreements with him from time to time. On top of being a good student, Greg also has a series of odd quirks (such as going to bed dressed as different superheroes and dressing as a car racer after learning Chris bought a car), but considers himself cool and nice. He has a book about almost everything in his locker. He is an only child and is of Italian and Swedish descent. His mother married his father because she lost a bet but ran off with his uncle Patrick Wuliger. After graduating from Corleone, Greg got a scholarship when he went to the Bronx Academy, whereas Chris went to Tattaglia in Season 4, but got kicked out due to poor grades after he adopted a tougher image. He later transferred to Tattaglia and the two continue their friendship. Although his father was seen in one episode his mother is never actually seen. Throughout the series, multiple relatives care for him - his father, grandmother, mother and aunt. Greg’s catchphrase is "You're so in there". He was absent from only two episodes in the entire series and only was reduced to a cameo appearance in one episode. In the series finale Caruso subjects Greg to bullying for the rest of his school life.

=== The Narrator ===
Chris Rock as The Narrator (voice), a sarcastic older Chris looking back at his youth, like that of The Wonder Years. His narration is often the opposite of what other characters say. The Narrator also mentions his disdain for then-president George W. Bush and by the singers Bobby Brown and Michael Jackson as he frequently says sarcastic things about them. For instance in one episode the narrator talks how Greg has gone from bad to worse like "America under Bush". He also states things like "who do you have to break up with to end up with Bobby Brown?" He also states that Bobby Brown perhaps dislikes him back, such as when he thinks Bobby Brown changed the channel after watching one of the situations of the show.

== Recurring characters ==
=== Bed-Stuy residents ===
- Mike Estime as Risky, a street dealer who sells items that are always bootlegged or stolen by him. His real name is Richard. Whenever he appears, a chorus of people whispering "Risky!" is heard in the background in the early episodes. He later works at Manny's barbershop. He also tried working with Julius for a night, but found the job not be as exciting as he hoped for, and then quit working with Julius to return selling his illegal goods. Estime returns to voice the character in the animated series, Everybody Still Hates Chris.
- Antonio Fargas as Doc Harris, the local grocery store owner. Chris later works for Doc. He is kind to Chris and gives him advice. When Chris is unable to work, Drew fills in for him. On Halloween, Doc dresses as a pimp named "Sweet Tooth" and takes children's candy. Fargas returns to voice the character in the animated spinoff, Everybody Still Hates Chris.
- Todd Bridges as "Monk", Doc's nephew and former U.S. Armed Forces member who manages the store when his uncle is away. Monk is a severely paranoid Vietnam war veteran and Operation Eagle Claw veteran suffering from post-traumatic stress disorder. Monk always wears a beret and surplus military clothing, and is married to a Korean American woman who works at the neighborhood beauty salon. In Episode 14 of Season 2, the Narrator says that Monk's real name is Jimmy.
- Kevontay Jackson as Jerome, Chris's only true friend aside from Greg. A dimwitted, older teenager in the neighborhood who frequently greets Chris with "Lemme hold a dollar" to which Chris almost always complies. He'll sometimes ask for a dollar just out of boredom. He nicknames Chris "li'l dude from across the street", or simply "li'l dude". In Jerome's first appearances on the series, he is a predatory, minor villain but that idea is soon abandoned and subsequent appearances portray him as a much friendlier person. Chris soon finds him becoming an unlikely friend, and on occasion, Chris will go to him when in need of some useful teenage advice, advice that he is only too happy to give – as soon as Chris gives him the dollar he asks for. The family once caught him breaking into their apartment with a credit card. Despite all of this, he does display genuine concern for Chris when he needs him. Jackson returns to voice the character in the animated spinoff, Everybody Still Hates Chris.
- Ernest Lee Thomas as Mr. Omar, a womanizing funeral director, who rents an upstairs room in the family's building. He is seen with a different newly widowed woman for almost every appearance he makes. He claims just to be consoling these attractive women in their time of grief. He frequently says "Tragic! Tragic!". He also frequently requests to "borrow" things and takes advantage of Rochelle's need to keep up appearances to the chagrin of Julius. For example, he uses their phone and racks up a huge phone bill, invites himself to dinner, and even borrows his way into a Thanksgiving dinner invitation. Thomas returns to voice the character in the animated spinoff, Everybody Still Hates Chris.
- Jeris Lee Poindexter as "Kill Moves", an insane, senile, homeless man who practices martial arts and at one point teaches Drew some karate moves. His real name is Edgar Devereaux. Kill Moves's mother is actually a millionaire and lives in the affluent Upper East Side, but he prefers to live freely on the streets. After being laid off by Ronald Reagan (he was in the Air Force, and got fired when Reagan introduced budget cuts) he had a breakdown, but he nevertheless sometimes reveals himself to be highly intelligent and cultured. In his first appearance, he is named Mr. Jackson. He occasionally gives Chris a hard time, for example when Chris is collecting empty cans for a school project, Kill Moves appears in trash bins before Chris can even run to them and leaves no cans for Chris. Poindexter returns to voice the character in the animated spinoff, Everybody Still Hates Chris.
- Blake Hightower as James, a 12-year-old neighborhood kid. James is flirty towards Tonya and wishes to have a relationship with her. He hangs along with the other supporting male characters at Manny's barbershop. The adult males treat James like he is their equal although he is a child. Another time, Chris was forced to volunteer to be a "Brother from Another Mother" for the sake of the school, and the child he mentors turns out to be James. Chris learns that James's real name is Cleavon Barris.
- Aree Davis as Keisha Dayton, the girl next door and Chris's dream girl during the first season. Unfortunately, she doesn't even attempt to give Chris a chance or get to know him and instead likes his younger brother Drew. In season 2, Keisha moved away to Compton, believing it to be a crime-free city.
- Keesha Sharp as Sheila Dayton, Keisha's mother and a good friend of Rochelle's. Julius usually feels uncomfortable around her because she's an attractive woman. Sharp however left after nine episodes to play the role of Monica on Girlfriends.
- Paige Hurd as Tasha Clarkson, the girl who moves in next door into Keisha's old house and is her replacement in season 2. Chris is in love with her but she wants to keep their relationship platonic. She dated and dumped him near the end of Season 4, due to Chris believing her to be clingy and slightly demanding as she constantly wanted to do the things she wants to do together. According to Chris, she is the only girl who doesn't hate him. She seems to have a slightly promiscuous side to her, and has also expressed attraction to bad boy types – something Chris is not. Paulina Singer voices the character in the animated spinoff, Everybody Still Hates Chris.
- Whoopi Goldberg as Louise Clarkson, the despicable and nosy next door neighbor and Tasha's maternal grandmother. She insults Chris because she believes that he wants to sleep with her granddaughter, and calls him a "cock-eyed hooligan" and "nappy headed" and infuriates Rochelle due to her being chief of the Neighborhood Watch for not being responsible. She only appears in two episodes of season two.
- Tisha Campbell as Juanita "Peaches" Clarkson, Louise's daughter and Tasha's mother. Peaches is very loud, ignorant and eccentric. She is an ex-con who befriends Rochelle in her first appearance. She also dates Malvo during her later appearances. She is also a kindhearted person despite her bad past. Campbell returns to voice the character in the animated spinoff, Everybody Still Hates Chris.
- Jackée Harry as Vanessa, Rochelle's bubbly, wise-cracking best friend and the gossipy owner of the local beauty salon after winning the lottery and buying it from Pam. She has dated Kill Moves and Rochelle's brother, Michael. Harry returns to voice the character in the animated spinoff, Everybody Still Hates Chris.
- Tasia Sherel as Pam, co-owner of the beauty salon. In season 4, it is stated that Pam sold her share of the salon to Vanessa. Rochelle takes Pam's place as the salon's manager. In the series finale, she returns once again to the beauty salon and it's constantly implied that she's rich and greedy, despite the fact that she asked Julius to give her $25.00 and said that "the best part about being rich, is that she doesn't owe any money to anyone". When he asked her again for his $25.00, she pretends that she forgot about it and that she doesn't have any money despite that there's a cash register in front of her.
- J. B. Smoove as Manny, the local owner of the barbershop who appeared in season 3. He is always shown giving helpful advice and joking around. He says that his real name is Lester but he changed his name to Manny so he didn't have to change the sign on the shop. In the fourth season, it is said that Manny moved away to Detroit. Smoove left to join the cast of 'Til Death.
- Jazz Raycole as Lisa Patterson, a neighborhood girl. She threw a Halloween party in season 1. Chris briefly developed a crush on her when she danced with him after being rejected by Keisha. She later appeared in season 3 having a spin the bottle party that Chris wants to get into with Tasha.
- Jim Lau as Mr. Fong, the owner of the Chinese restaurant where Chris works briefly after quitting Doc's. Abusive and exploitative, he gave Chris a very hard time, shows no sympathy for Chris's problems, he gets more demanding towards Chris, even if he doesn't work for him anymore. He constantly calls Chris "Lionel Richie". He is first seen trying to operate the restaurant out of the family's upstairs room.

- Ricky Harris as Malvo, a petty criminal who robs Chris at Doc's and threatens to kill him if he identifies him. Later, after he gets out of jail, he forces Chris to chain-snatch a gold medallion. When Chris refuses, Julius saves Chris by threatening to beat up and possibly kill Malvo if he goes near Chris. After he gets out of jail again, he enlists Chris to help him go back to high school. Soon after that, he becomes Chris's friend, but manages still go on as a thief. He begins going out with Tasha's mother Peaches. They met at the parole office that they shared.
- Myzel Robinson as Fat Mike, a neighborhood kid who protects Chris from local thugs and makes friends with him. In "Everybody Hates a Part-time Job" he buys the last leather jacket in the store, that Chris had been hoping to buy.

=== Corleone Junior High School/Tattaglia High School staff and students ===
- Travis T. Flory as Joey Caruso, the Irish-Italian-American, racist school bully who routinely picks on Chris, although he is surprisingly fond of African-American culture. Since the beginning of the show, he mostly picked and beat up Chris for no good reason, to which surprisingly he never got suspended or caught for, because of just being white. He is the main villain of the series. In each episode, he refers to Chris by a different nickname such as "Sammy", "Satchmo", "Kareem", "Tito" or "Cornbread", even at one point calling him the N-word and frequently gives cruel gifts to Chris. In the series finale, it is revealed that Caruso actually admires Chris and the only reason he has picked on Chris in school is because he has been jealous of his determination and achievement and had crushed Chris's spirit only so he himself would not feel inferior. Mikey Kelley voices the character in the animated spinoff, Everybody Still Hates Chris.
- Jacqueline Mazarella as Ms. Vivian Morello, Chris's beautiful, friendly, flirtatious but naively racist and dismissive teacher at his junior high school, and later, the principal at his high school. Due to her apparent attraction to Black men, she holds a soft spot for Chris and tries to support him at every opportunity (such as giving him a Valentine's Day card out of sympathy, or giving him advice on running for the class president). In her efforts to be supportive, however, she makes statements or uses analogies that come off as insensitive and even racist, even though she might not realize that – such as saying that "black people" must wake up and work up fields before sunrise, that they have tendencies towards vandalism, criminality and drugs, that they often make use of lies and blackmail to rise in life, that Chris has no father and his mother is crack-addicted, and when Chris tries to tell her the truth, she assumes Chris is lying because "he is on drugs" – most of which Chris tolerates. She is shown saying those same stereotypes to the confusions of the listener, at times Rochelle, Julius and even her dates. However, in "Everybody Hates Graduation", she finally realizes Chris's lifestyle, but believed that Chris lied, despite her being the one who made up all that stuff about Chris. In Chris Rock's narration often consists of him wanting to physically hurt her ("smack her upside the head with a brick") as well as making sarcastic remarks on her ethnicity as she does to him. Mazarella returns to voice the character in the animated spinoff, Everybody Still Hates Chris.
- Lynda Scarlino as Mrs. Abigail Milone, the elderly, embittered school monitor who is later promoted to Vice Principal of Corleone because, according to the adult Chris, she proved that the one thing that she hated a lot more than kids was working with them. She's often seen disciplining someone, and occasionally disciplines Chris even when he hasn't done anything wrong.
- Jude Ciccolella as Dr. Julius Raymond, the stern principal at Corleone Junior High. He makes racist assumptions about Chris and thinks that Chris is a crack baby. Despite this he does admonish Caruso and any other white kid that misbehaves and has even protected Chris. He always talks in a slow, monotone, voice. He normally is always grumpy because, according to the adult Chris, the school didn't pay him enough for his job. It is implied that he is gay when he is shown dancing with men in a bar dressed in leather. He is last seen in Everybody Hates Halloween.
- Jason Alexander as Principal Edwards, the eccentric new principal of Corleone who replaces Dr. Raymond in the second season. He is possibly the only non-racist staff member. He first appeared in Everybody Hates The Buddy System when he caught Chris and Caruso fighting and then tricks them into being buddies during a field trip. In Everybody Hates Snow Day, Chris and Edwards are the only ones who come to school on a snow day, where they develop a small-lived special relationship. In Everybody Hates Gretzky he calls to inform Julius that Chris did not show up for school. Additionally, Alexander directed two episodes for the series Everybody Hates Gambling and Everybody Hates Graduation.
- Paul Ben-Victor as Coach Roy Thurman, Chris's homeroom and social studies teacher in Tattaglia and also the coach for the football team. He hires Chris as the team's manager. He is hateful, sarcastic and unfair against people, especially towards Chris, and it is implied that he is racist or at least prejudiced, despite denying that he is, as he believes that the reason why black people were brought into slavery was because white people were too lazy to work. He once helped Chris by teaching how to box, despite the constant belittling he always gives Chris. Ben-Victor returns to voice the character in the animated spinoff, Everybody Still Hates Chris.
- Monica Anne Parales as Lisa, a hard-working, though seemingly racist Asian-American student and the head of the school's newspaper. She criticizes Chris very harshly about his writing when he joins the school's newspaper. When Chris is elected school president, she writes negative stories about him in effort to get him impeached. She is also harshly critical of Chris when he invites a white student to his school's prom.
- Peter Onorati as the Janitor and Coach Brantley. The janitor works at Tattaglia, and it is said in the show that if you give him 5 dollars, he can help you with anything. He refers to Chris as "Hey, you're that black kid." He has an identical cousin who is the coach of the wrestling team in Tattaglia. The coach gets Chris to join the team because no other schools have wrestlers in his weight class resulting in an automatic win.
- Johnny Palermo as Frank DiPaolo, a popular but dimwitted student. Chris picked him to be his school vice president in Corleone. He became president after Chris got impeached.
- Shelby Young as Jennifer Thompson, a student at Corleone who at first is attracted to Chris when he joins the basketball team. In later episodes, she is seen being mean to or ignoring Chris and Greg.
- Mackenzee Donham as Jennifer, another Corleone student who is attracted to Greg. Greg is attracted to her as well but always accidentally says something that makes her angry and storm away.
- Brooke Mackenzie as Sydney, a Corleone student who is mean to Chris, constantly calling him bug-eyes.
- B. J. Britt as Walter Dickerson, the popular, selfish, careless, self-absorbed, manipulative star of Tattaglia's football team who befriends Chris when he becomes the team's manager. He always belittles or insults Chris when it comes to him being nice. His catchphrase was "My man!" when Chris accepts one of his commands or says no, to which Walter took it too far as he began giving Chris a ridiculous amount of a chores to do for him, leaving him no time to do his own homework.
- Chris Rock as Mr. Abbott, an unhelpful school guidance counselor with a familiar voice. He tells Chris that he does not have the skills to make it to college. He advises Chris to take time to find himself instead of worrying about college. His dream was to serve America by becoming a crash test dummy.
- Marcel Lam as Bernard Yao, an Asian student and Corleone student who bullied Chris, Greg, Caruso and Caruso's friends and beats Caruso and Caruso's friends up using martial arts. Bernard refuses to take Caruso's place as the school bully which causes anarchy in the school. Chris convinces Bernard to fight Caruso again and lose on purpose. Later, Bernard constantly forces Chris to do his math homework for him much to Chris's surprise who assumed Bernard excels in math. Highly defiant of Asian stereotypes, his catchphrase is, "you either help me pass my math class or it's your ass".
- Sam Mandel as Fisher, who helps forge Chris's report card. He later helps Chris retrieve Chris's father's Playboy magazine from Mrs. Milone. Though he is usually seen with friends while sitting at a desk, he has a mysterious ability to make it instantly disappear by diverting people's attention.
- Mario Quinonez Jr. as the Puerto Rican Kid in Corleone who only speaks Spanish. Was once Greg's science fair partner. He spoke English once in an episode.
- Hector A. Garcia as Angel (actually pronounced "Ahn-hel" but people address him by how it's spelled), an androgynous male student at Tattaglia High, who is in Chris's cooking class. He helps Chris meet a girl in exchange for Chris helping him with his homework. Because of Angel's androgyny, he and Chris prefer not to be seen together in public. Angel appears a few times in Season 4.
- Kwame Boateng as Albert, the new black kid at Corleone who befriends Chris, which makes Greg jealous. Actually a street vandal, Albert committed several acts of vandalism inside Corleone High and Chris was framed. Greg helps Chris prove his innocence by exposing Albert's wrong deeds, resulting in Albert's expulsion.

=== Chris's extended family ===
- Earthquake as Uncle Mike, Rochelle's lazy, freeloading and obnoxious older brother and the maternal uncle of Chris, Drew, and Tonya. He knows how to get on Julius's bad side, such as by roaming about the house in Julius's clothes without asking him, giving him out-dated tickets for sport events or even shouting his trademark salutation "Big man!" at Julius – a thing that drives Julius into wrath or causes him to imagine that Mike wants something (generally unpleasant or unacceptable) from him. "Hey 'Chelle, y'all got somethin' to eat?" or " I didn't know y'all was about to have dinner," as his repeated phrases. Earthquake returns to voice the character in the animated spinoff, Everybody Still Hates Chris.
- Tony Rock (real-life brother of Chris Rock) as Uncle Ryan, one of Julius's younger brothers, and Drew's favorite paternal uncle who frequently asks him to invest in his shady business ventures. He has an office where he makes fake ID cards and X-ray glasses. His dream is to run a successful business, which can be difficult because all his attempts get shut down for one reason or another.
- Loretta Devine as Maxine, Rochelle's soft-spoken, helpful, but critical mother and the maternal grandmother of Chris, Drew, and Tonya. She and Rochelle don't always get along because she is critical of Rochelle and likes to take over. She also caused chaos when she visited for her husband's funeral. In a later episode Rochelle tries to set her up on a date, but it doesn't go so well. Maxine is also a mathematician and taught Rochelle everything she knows about math and helped out Chris with his math. It was said on one episode, that she's an even bigger "ghetto snob" than Rochelle. Devine returns to voice the character in the animated spinoff, Everybody Still Hates Chris.
- Monica Calhoun as Charlotte, also known as "Aunt Grievey", Rochelle's sensitive, sad, cynical, and unhappy younger sister who never stops crying and the maternal aunt of Chris, Drew, and Tonya. She's only seen at funerals. In her first appearance, she cries about her father Gene's death, she's very worried about his death. In one episode, Rochelle claims that Charlotte cries at every holiday: Easters, Halloweens, and Flag Days.
- Ikona Starr as Mousey, Maxine's sister, Rochelle's aunt and the maternal great-aunt of Chris, Drew, and Tonya. She speaks inaudibly high-pitched, hence her name. According to Julius, in "Everybody Hates Bomb Threats", she knows how to cure the mojo.
- Jimmie Walker as Gene, Rochelle's hilarious father, and the grandfather of Chris, Drew and Tonya, who dies of a heart attack at the dinner table on his first appearance on the show. Gene reappeared in flashbacks in "Everybody Hates Gambling", where Rochelle says that Gene gambled on just about anything, and "Everybody Hates the Port Authority", where he is shown teaching little Rochelle how to play three card monte.
- Wayne Brady as Uncle Louis, Julius's successful, highly skilled and charismatic younger brother, of whom Julius is very jealous.

=== Others ===
- Gary Basaraba as Art Wuliger, Greg's divorced father who never lets him have friends over.
- Mario Joyner as Dr. Information, the doctor who explains to the audience phrases and concepts of African-American culture.
- P.J. Marino as Detective Marino, the inept but persistent neighborhood detective who never seems to remember Chris. Marino frequently appears in Chris's mind when he imagines getting busted.
- Shon Little as Officer Davidson, the cop who usually shows up whenever there is a disturbance in Chris's neighborhood and sometimes in Chris's mind.
- Julie Lancaster as Barbara, a reporter who is seen on television covering news events that usually involve Chris or his family.
- Robert Wuhl as Abe Himelfarb, a pawnbroker who gives Chris everything he needs to be a DJ. He also runs for councilman off-screen in "Everybody Hates Bed-Stuy".
- Orlando Jones as Mr. Newton, the substitute teacher, who's exacting towards Chris, and Chris only, because he want him to get A's. Jones also plays Dr. Clint Huckstable, a Bill Cosby-esque dad who insists on meeting Chris when his daughter Jenise invites him to the Tattaglia Homecoming Dance. His Bill Cosby accent annoys Rochelle a lot.
- Tristin Mays as Jenice Huckstable, a girl Chris really liked and liked him back. Their attraction towards each other caused Greg to become jealous as he believes that Chris doesn't pay attention to him anymore, as he preferred hanging out with her than Greg, he constantly complained that whenever something good would happen to Chris, much worse things would happen to Greg. But exaggerated the point, by not coming home a day before the Homecoming dance in a depressed state. She later becomes Chris's Homecoming date, but he had to stand her up, because he was pressured by illusions of Jenice and Greg giving him the choice of finding Greg or wait for Jenice at the dance. Chris's family constantly assumed that she was retarded, as he was told that Jenice got kicked out of her old school. As Chris and Rochelle came back home, she officially declared that she hates Chris and saying that he could have called her before leaving her at Homecoming.
- Steve Landesberg as Stan Levine, an elderly man who is the last white person living in Bed-Stuy and rarely leaves his apartment. He is very distrustful of black people, as proven when he asked Chris to check his pockets, because he believed that Chris must have stolen something, since he spent his years living in Bed-Stuy. He helps Chris during a citywide blackout and Chris tries to repay for his kindness by helping him meet new friends. It's revealed that he knows Doc and has an unfinished feud with him, because Stan "stole" Doc's girlfriend. However, it's revealed by Stan that he had an affair with Doc's girlfriend, ending up with her pregnant and having no choice but by taking care of her and the child. Later, he began having a heart attack, with Chris being constantly blamed for taking him outside and getting a visit from his daughter, who planned taking him with her to Las Vegas. She decides let him stay in Bed-Stuy, which actually was because he refused to leave. By the end of the episode, another blackout happens and Chris wants Stan to let him inside, but refused to him in, because he was "about to die because of him."
- Jim Lampley as a Sportscaster in Tonya vs Drew in Checkers.
- DJ Quik as Hilton "Hilly Hill" Reed, the DJ, who takes over Chris's DJing duties at a party.
- Richard Lewis as Kris, a mysterious man whom Chris befriends at the hospital.
- Michael Spellman as Magician the Magician, a magician who once scared Julius with a rabbit.
- Christina DeRosa as Trixie, a young, tough New York stripper that Chris falls for.
- Vincent Pastore as Paulie, a mean bookie who threatens "Chrissy the Black" unless Doc loses a bet on basketball game.
- Phylicia Rashad as Kathleen Devereaux, Kill Moves's estranged mother whom Chris helps him find.
- Tommy Davidson as Eddie, a bank robber whom Julius takes to Las Vegas while working as a cab driver despite his initial reluctance to do so.
- Former NHL players Willie O'Ree and Kevin Weekes (who was still playing at the time) as strangers on the street who help Chris and Drew.
- LaVan Davis as Rev. Terrence Willstom, the local Church preacher.
- Shar Jackson as Alyson, the mother of one of Tonya's friends, Latrinda.
- Devika Parikh as Blair Huckstable, Clint's wife who also insists on meeting Chris.
- Robin Givens as Stacy Deveaux, Doc's crazy, conceited, rude, extremely demanding, and egotistical new girlfriend. She makes Chris do a ridiculous amount of chores around the store and her house and gives Chris and Rochelle a hard time when she comes to the salon and wants her hair done immediately.
- Kadeem Hardison as Judge Wadkins; he and Rochelle bumped heads in court, due to him adding another ticket for making a victory dance in court, after Rochelle won the case of her speeding ticket and he was also on the board of Hansel and Gretel. He's shown to be very unfair towards other people, except for beautiful women, as he is captivated by them, despite being married, as is constantly indicated by the Narrator and Rochelle.
- Stoney Jackson as Sensei Jackson, Chris and Drew's karate teacher.
