= Mazarelo =

Mazarelo is an Indian surname. Notable people with the surname include:

- James Mazarelo (born 2001), English field hockey player
- Sebastião Mazarelo (?–?), Indian politician and medical doctor

== See also ==
- Mazzarella
- Mazzarelli
- Mazzarello
- Mazzariello
- Mazarella
- Mazarelli
- Mazarello
