= Mazzarelli =

Mazzarelli is an Italian surname. Notable people with the surname include:

- Angela Mazzarelli, American judge
- Debra J. Mazzarelli (born 1955), American politician
- Giuseppe Mazzarelli (born 1972), Swiss footballer
- Paolo Mazzarelli (born 1975), Italian actor

== See also ==
- Torre Mazzarelli
- Mazzarella
- Mazzarello
- Mazzariello
- Mazarella
- Mazarelli
- Mazarello
- Mazarelo
