= Mazarello =

Mazarello is a surname notably borne by a couple of Indian singers and playwrights:

- Sharon Mazarello (born 1965), Indian singer, actress, director, playwright and filmmaker
- Wilson Mazarello (born 1946), Indian singer, writer, playwright and politician

== See also ==
- Mazzarella
- Mazzarelli
- Mazzarello
- Mazzariello
- Mazarella
- Mazarelli
- Mazarelo
