= Mazzariello =

Mazzariello is an Italian surname from Naples and Salerno. Notable people with the surname include:

- Antonio Mazzariello (born 2001), Italian singer-songwriter
- Cheryl Mazzariello Hooker (born 1950), American politician
- Michael Mazzariello (born 1951), American attorney and television personality

== See also ==
- Mazzarella
- Mazzarelli
- Mazzarello
- Mazarella
- Mazarelli
- Mazarello
- Mazarelo
