= Mazzarella (surname) =

Mazzarella is an Italian surname. Notable people with the surname include:

- Carlo Mazzarella (1919–1993), Italian actor and journalist
- Ciro Mazzarella (1940–2018), Italian Camorra mobster
- Domenico Mazzarella (1802–1854), Italian Roman Catholic priest
- Kathleen Mazzarella, American CEO of Graybar Electric
- Marcello Mazzarella (born 1963), Italian actor
- Merete Mazzarella (born 1945), Finnish author and literature researcher
- Piero Mazzarella (1928–2013), Italian actor

== See also ==
- Mazzarelli
- Mazzarello
- Mazzariello
- Mazarella
- Mazarelli
- Mazarello
- Mazarelo
