= Earthquake (comedian) =

American comedian and actor

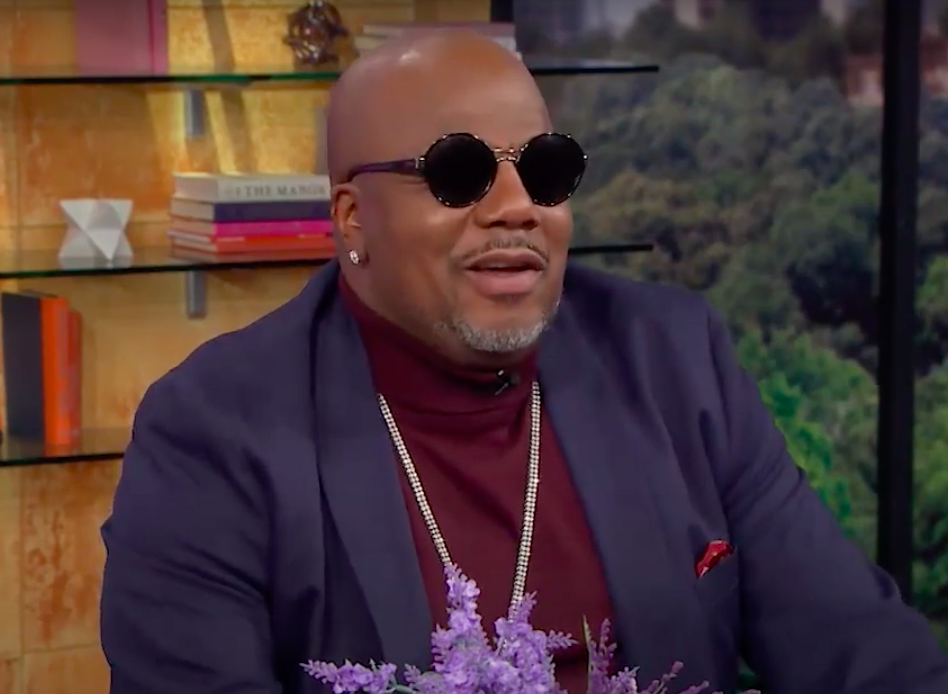
- Earthquake in 2020
- Born: Nathaniel Stroman; Washington, D.C., United States
- Notable work: Uncle Mike on Everybody Hates Chris; Karl in The Longshots; Root in Barnyard & Back at the Barnyard

Comedy career
- Years active: 1980s – present
- Medium: Stand-up, television, film
- Genres: Observational comedy, improvisational comedy, black comedy
- Subjects: African-American culture, racism, race relations, relationships
- Website: www.therealearthquake.com

Nathaniel Stroman, known professionally by his stage name Earthquake, is an American stand-up comedian, actor, voice artist and radio personality. He hosts a radio show entitled, Quakeshouse for SiriusXM and Kevin Hart's Laugh Out Loud Network. His first Netflix special entitled Chappelle's Home Team- Legendary: Earthquake was produced by Dave Chappelle and his Magic Lemonade production entity in February 2022.

Earthquake performed a half-hour HBO special as part of the series One Night Stand, which first aired on August 26, 2005. His film credits include a small role in Kevin Smith's film Clerks II (2006), and a supporting role in the film The Longshots (2008). His television appearances include a recurring role on CBS sitcom The Neighborhood (2018-2021) starring Cedric the Entertainer, cameos on South Side (2019), In the Cut (2017), and more. Earthquake's additional television credits include a recurring role as Chris' Uncle Mike, on Everybody Hates Chris. He voiced Root the Rooster in the 2006 CGI film, Barnyard and in the video game of the same title, and continued to do so on the TV series spinoff, Back at the Barnyard. Earthquake reprised his voice role as Uncle Mike in Everybody Still Hates Chris.

== Early life ==
Nathaniel “Earthquake” Stroman was born in Washington, D.C.; his mother gave him the nickname “Earthquake”. She said: “Any time you take all the precautions not to have a kid, from the diaphragm to .... a condom, and you still have a child, there's nothing else you can name that child but a natural disaster."

He enlisted in the United States Air Force after graduating from Ballou High School. Later he explained that he joined the military to get out of his mother's house.

== Military career ==
Stroman enlisted in the Air Force on the day after his high school graduation. As stated by Stroman to Matt Ehlers of the Raleigh News & Observer “My mother argued with me, hollered at me, and I wasn't getting a check, so how hard could basic training be?”. He was an AFSC 2W1X1, Aircraft Armament Systems Specialist. As a guest on The Howard Stern Show, he claimed to have accidentally dropped a nuclear weapon while attempting to load it onto a B-52 Stratofortress at Barksdale Air Force Base, Louisiana.

== Early comedic career ==
In the early 1990s, Earthquake started off doing gigs in small clubs. By 1993 he co-owned Uptown Comedy Corner in Atlanta's vibrant Buckhead entertainment district. While there he continued to hone his skills as the much sought after house host and featured some of the greatest minds in stand-up. Later he opened a club of his own, Earthquake's Comedy Corner II in Dallas, Tx. and Atlanta, Ga., respectively. In 1997, Earthquake got his national break when he was asked to join the Russell Simmons Def Comedy Jam Tour.

Earthquake started his career in the Airforce in the talent show “Tops and Blues”. In 2002, Earthquake joined Latham Entertainment Presents Comedy Tour. In 2004, he signed a deal with ABC to create his own sitcom called Earthquake,” which later fell through, although in 2005 he performed one of his most popular best shows “About Goddamn Time”. In 2007, he appeared in All Star Def Comedy Jam, and in 2008 appeared in with TBS Comedy Festival Lollapalooza. In 2009, Earthquake starred in Shaquille O Neal’s All star Comedy Jam Special (comedy zone). In 2011, he made a guest appearance in TV One: Way Black When show.

== WBLS ==
Earthquake started off in radio contributing every Tuesday and Thursday on The Steve Harvey Morning Show and has been known to fill-in as a personality while Steve Harvey was on vacation. In 2013, Quake joined 107.5 WBLS as a full-time radio personality weekdays from 3pm to 7pm with Déjà Vu. He left the station in February 2016.

== Recognition ==
In April 2013, he appeared on ABC’s The View in a special segment of stand-up comedians showcased by the cast of The View as their personal favorites; Quake appeared on the show as the favorite of Whoopi Goldberg. Comedian John Mulaney included About Got Damn Time on his list of his favorite comedy albums, saying, "just trying to mix Spalding Gray and Earthquake and Bernie Mac into some kind of amalgam has been the goal of my career."

== Personal life ==
Earthquake is married to Rashida Miller.
