= TJ Ashford =

Fictional character from General Hospital

- General Hospital character
- Tajh Bellow as TJ Ashford
- Portrayed by: Krys Meyer (2012); Tequan Richmond (2012–2018); Tajh Bellow (2018–present)
- Duration: 2012–2024
- First appearance: January 17, 2012
- Created by: Garin Wolf and Shelly Altman
- Introduced by: Jill Farren Phelps
In-universe information
- Other names: Thomas Ashford, Jr.
- Occupation: Doctor; Student; Waiter
- Father: Shawn Butler; Tommy Ashford (legal)
- Mother: Jordan Ashford
- Stepfather: Curtis Ashford
- Civil partner: Molly Lansing (2021–2024)
- Daughters: Irene Davis-Ashford
- Grandfathers: Ray Butler; Marshall Ashford (legal)
- Grandmothers: Irene Ashford (legal)
- Uncles: Curtis Ashford (legal)
- Aunts: Monet Mitchell
- First cousins: Trina Robinson (legal); Desmond Ashford (legal)

TJ Ashford is a fictional character from General Hospital, an American soap opera on the ABC network. The role was originated in 2012 by Krys Meyer when TJ was introduced as the troubled teenage son of Shawn Butler (Sean Blakemore)'s deceased best friend, Tommy, whom Shawn had killed in combat.

The rebellious teenager attracts the attention of the good girl Molly Lansing (Haley Pullos). The two start dating in secret and Molly's mother Alexis Davis (Nancy Lee Grahn) initially disapproves of the romance but she and Shawn eventually let the teens continue to see each other. In 2013, the couple splits because of TJ's jealousy over Molly's friendship with Rafe Kovich (Jimmy Deshler). After Rafe's interference and TJ's one-night-stand with Taylor DuBois (Samantha Logan), the couple reconciles. In 2014, TJ's estranged mother Jordan (Vinessa Antoine) arrives and TJ starts college in the fall. He struggles to rebuild his relationship with Jordan, and eventually does, but disapproves of her lying to him.

== Storylines ==
TJ Ashford (Krys Meyer) travels to Port Charles from Baltimore, Maryland, arriving on Shawn Butler (Sean Blakemore)'s doorstep when his mother, Jordan Ashford, sends him away, having decided she can't handle raising him. He is given the choice of living with Shawn or attending military school. At first, Shawn is reluctant to take him in until TJ reminds Shawn of his part in his father Tommy's death. Shawn moves TJ in with him at Kelly's Diner and enrolls him in Port Charles High, where he befriends Molly Lansing (Haley Pullos). Molly offers to tutor TJ when she realizes he has trouble reading.

Later TJ is arrested for stealing a car and joyriding and Molly's mother, attorney Alexis Davis (Nancy Lee Grahn), manages to get the charges dropped. Shawn thinks Molly will be a good influence on TJ and encourages them to spend time together. In exchange for tutoring him, TJ agrees to help Molly make more friends by creating a fake social media account for her. He also throws a wild party which ends with Molly's house being destroyed and her passing out from alcohol poisoning. TJ admits to throwing the party without her knowledge and Alexis forbids them from seeing each other. However, TJ and Molly start dating in secret after the party in February 2012. In the summer of 2012, Molly and TJ's secret romance is discovered her by sister Kristina (Lindsey Morgan), but Molly convinces her to keep quiet. However, Alexis discovers the truth on the 4th of July when she discovers TJ half naked in Molly's bedroom and bans them from seeing one another again, although TJ was only changing clothes so he and Molly could spend the day at the lake swimming. After much begging, and Shawn's support, TJ and Molly get their parents' blessing to continue seeing each other. When TJ (now Tequan Richmond) and Molly are faced with death when the town's water supply is poisoned, they make a bucket list and contemplate having sex for the first time. TJ celebrates with Molly when she writes her own novel but her book is stolen by Connie Falconeri (Kelly Sullivan). TJ tries but fails to get the book back.

In 2013, TJ gets jealous when Molly befriends Rafe Kovich (Jimmy Deshler), although she insists they are just friends. TJ disapproves when Molly helps Rafe escape police custody and hides him at her house. TJ makes plans to ask Molly to prom but she confesses that Rafe kissed her. TJ confronts Rafe and punches him, warning him to stay away from Molly. Molly breaks up with him because he doesn't trust her. TJ finds comfort with his new prom date Taylor DuBois (Samantha Logan) and they have sex. TJ immediately regrets the decision and wants to reconcile with Molly, but those plans are derailed when Taylor reveals that they had sex. Fortunately, Molly eventually forgives TJ and they reunite in September 2013. When the duo celebrates the sequel to her first book, Molly forgets that she dedicated it to Rafe when she and TJ were broken up. Though TJ understands the situation, Molly rewrites the dedication for him. Rafe and Taylor unsuccessfully scheme to break them up.

Meanwhile, Shawn's job in organized crime breaks up his relationship with Alexis and TJ is dragged into when he is taken hostage by Carlos Rivera (Jeffrey Vincent Parise). TJ witnesses Morgan Corinthos (Bryan Craig) accidentally shoot Max Giambetti and is questioned by the police after Shawn rescues him. Shawn's boss and Molly's uncle Sonny Corinthos (Maurice Benard) realize that TJ might be a target for rival mob family, the Jeromes. They consider having him leave town, only for police commissioner Anna Devane (Finola Hughes) to bring him in for questioning. When the Jerome family makes threats against TJ, Shawn contacts his mother because he wants to send TJ back home to keep him safe.

While the threats to his safety lessen, TJ's mom Jordan (Vinessa Antoine) comes to Port Charles to be near her son in 2014. It is later revealed that Rafe tipped the police off about TJ witnessing the shooting. In the spring of 2014, TJ is accepted to Port Charles University, and his proud mom buys him a new car. When TJ and Molly decide to have sex for the first time, Rafe informs Alexis of their plans and she catches them in a hotel room together. TJ is shocked when Jordan is arrested for drug trafficking working for the Jeromes and learns that she only sent him to live with Shawn because she was in prison. Later, when TJ discovers Rafe doing drugs and warns him to quit, Rafe taunts TJ about Jordan's criminal history and punches him.

In July 2014, Rafe and Molly are involved in a car wreck, and despite his feelings, TJ supports Molly when Rafe dies. Though TJ disapproves of their profession, he is relieved when Jordan starts working with Shawn. In January 2015, TJ is shocked when Jordan and Shawn suddenly confess that Shawn actually killed Tommy in self-defense. Tommy had discovered Shawn and Jordan's affair and tried to kill Shawn. TJ is relieved to know that Tommy is indeed his biological father. Later, Shawn and Jordan's boss Duke Lavery (Ian Buchanan) offers to cover TJ's college tuition as payment for Jordan's loyalty. In May 2015, TJ is furious when Shawn is arrested by Jordan herself, who admits to being an undercover cop. TJ is devastated when Shawn is sent to prison, realizing he's lost the only stable parent he's ever had because Molly's father and Shawn's attorney Ric Lansing (Rick Hearst) couldn't refute the evidence.

In 2020, TJ goes missing after Molly turns down his marriage proposal, hurting him deeply. Molly and TJ become civil partners in 2021.

== Development ==
=== Casting and creation ===
In October 2011, the series put out a casting call for a 14-year-old African American actor for the role of TJ. The role was said to be recurring but the actor would get a lot of screen time. The character was expected to make his appearance sometime during or after December. In December 2011, Soaps In Depth reported that Krys Meyer had been cast in the role of TJ. Meyer would make his debut on January 17, 2012 on a recurring basis as the son of one of Shawn Butler (Sean Blakemore)'s fellow Marines. In July 2012, the series put out a casting call for an actor similar to Meyer which led to speculation that the role was to be recast. Jamey Giddens later reported that Meyer had booked a new gig and the role needed to be recast immediately.

On July 23, 2012, Tequan Richmond, known for his role as Drew on the sitcom Everybody Hates Chris, announced that he had joined the cast of General Hospital and would film his first scenes on July 24. Richmond's casting was officially later officially confirmed by the network. Meyer last appeared in the role on August 1, and Richmond made his debut on August 16, 2012.

Richmond had initially taken the recurring role until he started production on the syndicated sitcom Mr. Box Office. However, in November 2012, Richmond was listed as a contract cast member. Richmond confirmed this during an interview in September 2013. After months of limited screen time, in April 2016, Richmond announced that he was no longer under contract with the series and had been filming other projects. He confirmed that future appearances would depend on his availability.

In October 2018, it was reported that Richmond would join the television adaptation of the 1992 film Boomerang, making his status with the show unclear. However, one month later, it was reported that Richmond has left the show and the role of TJ would be recast with Tajh Bellow. Richmond last appeared on October 19, 2018, while Bellow made his debut on November 20, 2018. In February 2022, Bellow began appearing as a regular cast member. In February 2025, it was revealed Bellow had been demoted back to recurring status, following his removal from the serial's end credits.

The original casting call for the role of TJ described the character as urban, rebellious, and an "appealing kid who masks it with a huge chip on his shoulder." When the role was recast, the casting call described TJ as charming and charismatic as well as "a tad cocky." TJ is drawn to trouble "but has a soft and sensitive side." Tequan Richmond implied that TJ's naïve nature adds to his charm. "He's definitely blind to certain things", the actor explained. Like most teenagers, TJ thinks he knows everything he needs to know.

=== Relationships ===
The character was originally introduced under Garin Wolf as a love interest for the teenage Molly Lansing (Haley Pullos). The relationship is central to TJ's early development within the series. In early 2013, the series introduced Jimmy Deshler in the role of Rafe Kovich. Rafe takes develops a crush on Molly, and the writers develop a triangle between the teenagers. While Molly sees Rafe as a friend, "TJ think it's more" and it causes tension for the couple. At one point, TJ's jealous causes Molly to dump him. In May 2013, it was announced that the series would introduce Samantha Logan in the role of Taylor DuBois. Taylor "takes an immediate liking to TJ" which causes even more trouble for Molly and TJ. Head writer Ron Carlivati said of the decision, "Not everything can be a triangle." TJ and Taylor have a one-night stand which almost destroys his relationship with Molly when they finally reunite.

After their reconciliation, TJ and Molly agree to have sex for the first time, after being together for two years. "If it were up to the Hollywood standards, we would have had sex by now", Richmond said. TJ and Molly's emphasis on being safe about the decision shows "a different side of this age and that all teens aren't alike." Though the decision to have sex is mutual, Richmond explained that TJ is unsure of the choice, "because he doesn't know if Molly's ready." He does not want to rush her. Molly admits to her sister that she had sex with TJ.

=== Family ===
When the producers first put out the casting call for the role of TJ, there was speculation that he would be the son of Sean Blakemore's Shawn Butler. However upon the character's introduction, TJ is revealed to be the son of Shawn's best friend and fellow Marine, Tommy Ashford, whom Shawn accidentally killed in combat. Though TJ initially holds it over Shawn's head, he eventually forgives him for his role in Tommy's death.

In 2014, Vinessa Antoine joined the cast in a mystery role and is revealed to be TJ's estranged mother Jordan. TJ immediately picks up on the tension between them but doesn't have any illusions about them becoming one big happy family. He "just wishes they'd get along."

== Reception ==
The character received mixed to positive reviews while Richmond has been praised for his portrayal. While Jamey Giddens of Daytime Confidential did not care for Meyer's TJ upon his introduction, he later said, "Since then, the character and actor have grown on me... Molly and TJ are one of the most refreshingly-realistic teen stories soaps has done in years." When it was announced that TJ would be recast, Giddens said he would miss Meyer in the role but suggested Tequan Richmond for the recast specifically. Giddens said casting Richmond, "who is well known to the black community", would be great exposure for the show in urban press, which could attract Richmond's young female fanbase as viewers.

For the year of 2012, Richmond ranked at No. 4 on Daytime Confidential's list of the "Top 5 Soap Opera Newcomers" in soaps for, while Molly and TJ ranked at No. 10 on Daytime Confidential's list of the "Top 10 Soap Opera Couples". The couple continued General Hospital's tradition of "cute teen couples."

In 2014 Richmond received an NAACP Image Award nomination for Outstanding Actor in a Daytime Drama Series. In 2015, he was nominated for the Daytime Emmy Award for Outstanding Younger Actor in a Drama Series for his portrayal of TJ. While Richmond was not favored to win the award, Jenn Bishop of TV Source Magazine described him as "one of the most underappreciated young actors in the soap genre." Bishop praised Richmond for the consistency of his acting, and for not being "dull" when compared to some his fellow younger actors. "The emotional range and talent [he] displays in his reel is an excellent representation of the quality of work he put out all year. He’s able to easily navigate the anger and grief his character TJ feels in response to some shocking news. I won't be mad if he manages to be the upset in this category."
