= List of Everybody Hates Chris episodes =

The following is a list of episodes for the UPN/The CW situation comedy television series Everybody Hates Chris, which ran from September 22, 2005 to May 8, 2009. During the course of the series, 88 episodes of Everybody Hates Chris aired over four seasons.

Each season consists of 22 episodes, and every episode has its title begin with the phrase "Everybody Hates..."

== Series overview ==
Season	Episodes	Originally released		
Season	Episodes	First released	Last released	Network
1	22	September 22, 2005	May 11, 2006	UPN
2	22	October 1, 2006	May 14, 2007	The CW
3	22	October 1, 2007	May 18, 2008	The CW
4	22	October 3, 2008	May 8, 2009	The CW

== Episodes ==
=== Season 1 (2005–06) ===
No. overall	No. in season	Title	Directed by	Written by	Original release date	Prod. code	Viewers (millions)
1	1	"Everybody Hates the Pilot"	Reginald Hudlin	Story by : Chris Rock & Ali LeRoi; Teleplay by : Ali LeRoi	September 22, 2005	101	7.78
Chris (Tyler James Williams) commutes to and is bullied at a predominantly white school to fulfill his mother, Rochelle's (Tichina Arnold) wish for a better education, and also move out of the projects into a house. His schedule for this one school day is to go to school, buy lunch with money, come home from school on time to pick up his siblings Drew (Tequan Richmond) and Tonya (Imani Hakim) and ensure that his father (Terry Crews) maintains a stable rest & meal. Unfortunately, the day does not go as planned. Note: This episode does not end with "Everybody Hates Chris".
2	2	"Everybody Hates Keisha"	Eric Laneuville	Kriss Turner	September 29, 2005	103	6.01
Chris tries to impress the girl of his dreams (Aree Davis) after she is hired to tutor Drew. Chris is soon heartbroken when he finds Keisha and Drew kissing. Julius becomes uncomfortable around Rochelle's new friend (and Keisha's mother) Sheila, due to her being around the house all the time.
3	3	"Everybody Hates Basketball"	Lev L. Spiro	Aron Abrams & Gregory Thompson	October 6, 2005	104	5.96
Because he's black, Chris is recruited by the basketball team despite the fact he can't play. His instant popularity amongst the teachers and other students hurts his friendship with Greg (Vincent Martella). The family decides to rent their upstairs room, but Rochelle becomes increasingly suspicious of Mr. Tate, their extremely mysterious and off-putting new tenant.
4	4	"Everybody Hates Sausage"	Lev L. Spiro	Ali LeRoi	October 13, 2005	102	6.33
Julius buys a crate of cheap sausage for the family to eat for a week but the family soon begins to dislike it and Tonya tests Rochelle's patience by outright refusing to eat it. Chris has to deal with bullying by Caruso after false rumors spread that he beat up Caruso, and has to deal with an unfair school administration and sentence three days in detention. Note: This episode does not end with "Everybody Hates Chris".
5	5	"Everybody Hates Fat Mike"	Eric Laneuville	Craig DiGregorio & Ali LeRoi	October 20, 2005	105	5.52
Chris finds himself in hot water when he is disregarding his father's warning, allows a neighborhood kid to ride his bike who then takes off with it. Julius's coworkers go on strike, so he fills his free time with doing housework, much to Rochelle's dismay. Note: Greg (Vincent Martella) does not appear in this episode.
6	6	"Everybody Hates Halloween"	Eric Laneuville	Rodney Barnes & Courtney Lilly	October 27, 2005	107	5.39
Chris is excited to go to a Halloween party that an older girl invites him to, before he can go to the party, he must take Drew and Tonya trick-or-treating. Meanwhile, Julius buys cheap candy to hand out to the neighborhood kids (M&N's, Two Musketeers, ButterThumbs, and Gravy Ways), to Rochelle's -- who despises being perceived as poor -- disapproval.
7	7	"Everybody Hates the Babysitter"	Ken Whittingham	Alyson Fouse	November 3, 2005	108	5.24
Julius and Rochelle go out to a restaurant for a night, leaving a babysitter (Erica Hubbard) to watch the kids, but disasters occur both at home and at the restaurant. Note: Greg (Vincent Martella) does not appear in this episode.
8	8	"Everybody Hates the Laundromat"	Gina Prince-Bythewood	Kriss Turner	November 10, 2005	109	5.33
A tired Chris spends his Saturday morning with his siblings at a laundromat, and Tonya storms out after arguing with Chris.
9	9	"Everybody Hates Food Stamps"	Jerry Levine	Ali LeRoi	November 17, 2005	110	5.42
Julius finds $200 in food stamps, but Rochelle is too embarrassed to use them, so she dips into the family's spending money and has to keep it a secret from a suspicious Julius. Chris and Greg have a falling-out over a science project they are working on together. Note: This is one of a few episodes where the main plot does not revolve around Chris.
10	10	"Everybody Hates Greg"	Jerry Levine	Howard Gewirtz	November 24, 2005	106	2.79
Chris decides to go to Greg's house to play some video games, but neither boy's family is entirely okay with it at first. (Greg's father, Art: Gary Basaraba). Note: Tyler James Williams' real life brothers, Tyrel Jackson Williams and Tylen Jacob Williams portray younger versions of Chris and Drew respectively.
11	11	"Everybody Hates Christmas"	Dennie Gordon	Alyson Fouse & Ali LeRoi	December 15, 2005	112	4.95
Chris wants a portable cassette player for Christmas but his parents cannot afford to buy one, despite them obliging his siblings and themselves. At school, Chris brings in canned goods for the needy, but his teacher insistently believes that he is one of the needy. When Tonya hears from Drew that there is no such thing as Santa Claus, she instantly loses her Christmas spirit.
12	12	"Everybody Hates a Part Time Job"	Tamra Davis	Aron Abrams & Gregory Thompson	January 19, 2006	111	3.72
Chris learns the value of a dollar when he begins to work with his father to save up the money needed to get a leather jacket, which he believes will make him look cool. After their school is closed for maintenance, Drew and Tonya engage in a game of "dares" which ends up in a hospital visit.
13	13	"Everybody Hates Picture Day"	Linda Mendoza	Story by : Aron Abrams, Kevin A. Garnett & Gregory Thompson; Teleplay by : Kevin A. Garnett	February 2, 2006	113	4.24
As school picture day approaches, Chris wants to find the perfect outfit with his mother's help. He finds the perfect outfit, but during gym class, someone steals his clothes out of his locker. Rochelle begins a job as a cosmetics saleswoman to earn extra money. Drew and Tonya engage in a war of attrition over tattling.
14	14	"Everybody Hates Valentine's Day"	Millicent Shelton	Lance Crouther	February 9, 2006	114	4.39
Chris breaks up a fight between his "bus crush" (Raven Goodwin) and her boyfriend, while Greg gets his first girlfriend. Rochelle and Julius attempt to manage the many valentines both Tonya and Drew are receiving.
15	15	"Everybody Hates the Lottery"	Malcolm D. Lee	Rodney Barnes	February 16, 2006	115	4.50
Chris gets involved in a rivalry as he tries to hold on to his fame as the best Asteroids player in the neighborhood. Julius tries to win the lottery for extra money. As family expenses pile up, Rochelle becomes really mad when she is forced to stop eating chocolate turtles.
16	16	"Everybody Hates the Gout"	Jerry Levine	Story by : Aeysha Carr & Ali LeRoi; Teleplay by : Ali LeRoi	March 2, 2006	116	3.77
While Julius has the gout, he discovers his passion for The Young and the Restless, a passion he shares with several of Rochelle's female friends. Chris forges an A on his report card so as to avoid revealing an F to his mother.
17	17	"Everybody Hates Funerals"	Matt Shakman	Alyson Fouse	March 23, 2006	117	4.37
Chris' beloved maternal grandfather (Jimmie Walker) dies from an unexpected heart attack while paying a visit. This causes Chris to become the mother of the household when Rochelle is too upset to do anything. Rochelle begins to act nice in a strange way as her extended family comes to town to pay their respects, and she becomes fed up with her impolite mother (Loretta Devine).
18	18	"Everybody Hates Corleone"	Chris Rock	Felicia D. Henderson	April 13, 2006	122	3.10
Chris tries to get himself expelled as he grows intolerant of his constant physical & verbal bullying at Corleone when his parents won't let him leave. Julius finds a job at a fish market that pays more than his previous two jobs combined and gives him more free time, but his family eventually finds the cost of the bad smell too much to handle. Note: This episode doesn't end with "Everybody Hates Chris".
19	19	"Everybody Hates Drew"	Jerry Levine	Story by : Lance Crouther; Teleplay by : Aron Abrams & Gregory Thompson	April 20, 2006	118	3.69
Feeling inferior to his younger brother Drew, Chris takes karate classes and uses a move taught by his karate teacher to break Drew's hand in a fight. Rochelle has to teach Tonya the limits of gossiping when they go to the beauty shop.
20	20	"Everybody Hates Playboy"	Lev L. Spiro	Chuck Sklar	April 27, 2006	119	3.00
Chris steals his father's Playboy magazine from his toolbox. He brings it to school where it soon gets confiscated by the vice principal. When Julius discovers that his Playboy magazine is missing, he desperately tries to get it back. Tonya discovers Drew's arachnophobia, and uses it to scare him, but Drew may have gotten more than he asks for when he uses her fear of clowns to retaliate.
21	21	"Everybody Hates Jail"	Jeff Melman	Andrew Orenstein	May 4, 2006	121	3.17
Chris is selling cookies to raise money for a field trip to Washington, D.C. Chris sales start to skyrocket where he starts to saying that the cookies "Fell off the truck this morning" which is slang for "stolen". Julius' plan to see Dreamgirls with Rochelle on their wedding anniversary is thwarted when Tonya and Drew catch chickenpox.
22	22	"Everybody Hates Father's Day"	Ali LeRoi	Rodney Barnes & Ali LeRoi	May 11, 2006	120	3.31
Chris goes out looking for the perfect Father's Day gift for his father. However, all Julius wants is to spend the day alone, which the rest of the family doesn't quite approve of.

=== Season 2 (2006–07) ===
No. overall	No. in season	Title	Directed by	Written by	Original release date	Prod. code	Viewers (millions)
23	1	"Everybody Hates Rejection"	Ken Whittingham	Andrew Orenstein	October 1, 2006	202	2.44
When Keisha moves away, a girl in the neighborhood catches Chris eye, which prompts Chris to ask her on a date. The new next door neighbor, Louise Clarkson (Whoopi Goldberg) moves in next door and pressures Rochelle to organize a neighborhood watch patrol. After volunteering to be a crossing guard, Drew has girls all over him. This episode marks the first appearance of Tasha Clarkson (Paige Hurd).
24	2	"Everybody Hates the Class President"	Jerry Levine	Ali LeRoi	October 8, 2006	201	2.36
Chris runs for 8th-grade class president against Caruso. Julius learns he has high blood pressure and tries to reduce the amount of stress in his life. Tonya wants Drew to teach her how to Moonwalk like Billy Ocean.
25	3	"Everybody Hates Elections"	Ali LeRoi	Ali LeRoi	October 16, 2006	203	3.00
In order to win votes for class president, Chris tries to write a campaign speech. Rochelle rents out the upstairs apartment to a funeral director (Ernest Thomas) with a long list of lady friends. Drew finds money that his mother lost and spends it.
26	4	"Everybody Hates a Liar"	Jerry Levine	Adrienne Carter	October 23, 2006	204	3.19
Jerome assumes that Chris and Tasha are a thing and tells the entire neighborhood after he sees Tasha give Chris a kiss. Chris does not encourage nor stop the rumor because of the better treatment he gets at school. Julius wants to get something fun with his collection of trading stamps but Rochelle wants a new refrigerator. Drew starts to get upset when Rochelle is suddenly too busy with housework, feeling rejected in comparison to Chris and Tonya. Louise is furious with Rochelle for letting Chris spread rumours of her granddaughter.
27	5	"Everybody Hates Malvo"	Debbie Allen	Alyson Fouse	October 30, 2006	205	3.56
Chris gets robbed by Malvo (Ricky Harris), a local thug after Doc lets him work the cash register at the corner store and he fears the thief will kill him if he snitches. After buying a Betamax, Julius gets mad when Tonya tapes her cartoons over his The Young and the Restless and he refuses to apologize to Tonya for scaring her.
28	6	"Everybody Hates the Buddy System"	Ken Whittingham	Ali LeRoi	November 6, 2006	206	3.18
The new school principal, Mr. Edwards (Jason Alexander) teams Chris with Caruso on a field trip in hope that the two will bond. Tonya accidentally loses one of Rochelle's hoop earrings after being told she cannot wear them. Drew earns a 100% on his spelling test, so he asks Julius to buy him a Wayne Gretzky jersey and Julius gets Drew a Jersey saying Gritzky number 98.
29	7	"Everybody Hates Promises"	Millicent Shelton	Chuck Sklar	November 13, 2006	207	3.22
Students want to impeach Chris as class president after he fails to deliver on his campaign promises. Rochelle's never-do-well brother, Michael, visits after their mother kicks him out of her house, and asks if he can stay. Rochelle agrees but Julius is not happy about it. Tonya asks Drew to teach her how to double-dutch.
30	8	"Everybody Hates Thanksgiving"	Matt Shakman	Alyson Fouse	November 20, 2006	209	3.38
Chris is given a holiday assignment for Thanksgiving and is told that he must write about what he's thankful for. Julius wants to create a fantastic Thanksgiving meal in order to impress his younger brother, Louis (Wayne Brady).
31	9	"Everybody Hates Superstition"	Debbie Allen	Adam Lorenzo	November 27, 2006	208	3.28
Things start going Chris's way at home and at school after he wears his dad's lucky socks. Drew and Tonya play Julius and Rochelle against each other. Drew asks Rochelle for a new suit for his talent show performance even though Julius already told him no, and Tonya asks Julius for pink carpet in her bedroom even though Rochelle already told her no.
32	10	"Everybody Hates Kris"	Victor Nelli, Jr.	Adrienne Carter	December 11, 2006	210	2.80
Chris falls ill while working with Julius at a department store as Santa Claus and one of Santa's elves. While in the hospital, he meets a mysterious man named Kris (Richard Lewis), who helps him see how blessed he really is. Drew and Tonya start acting extremely nice toward their parents and doing additional work around the house, in the hopes to get the toys they want for Christmas.
33	11	"Everybody Hates Eggs"	Jerry Levine	Lisa Parsons	January 22, 2007	211	2.83
Chris must care for an egg like it is a baby for a week as part of a social-studies project on parenting, but when Rochelle finds out that Chris was going to keep it in the refrigerator for the week, Chris finds out being a parent isn't as easy as it sounds. Drew finds out that Tonya is afraid of werewolves. So he tells her that werewolves appear at nighttime, which causes her to not want to sleep. Julius tries to find ways to lower the electricity use in the home when he notices the light bill is over $20 higher than it normally is.
34	12	"Everybody Hates Hall Monitors"	Arlene Sanford	Aeysha Carr	January 29, 2007	214	2.79
Chris becomes a hall monitor at school to get some respect, but no one takes him seriously. Julius grows weary of Rochelle coming home complaining about her new job. Tonya gets frustrated because her girlfriends spend more time with Drew than with her.
35	13	"Everybody Hates Snow Day"	Jerry Levine	Ali LeRoi & Andrew Orenstein	February 5, 2007	215	3.16
Chris is the only one that shows up when Corleone is closed for a snow day and has to stay with Principal Edwards until they can get in touch with his parents. While going to get Chris from school, Julius has an extremely tough journey getting there. Rochelle and a few other citizens get held up by a robber while on a train ride.
36	14	"Everybody Hates the Substitute"	Millicent Shelton	Andrew Orenstein	February 12, 2007	212	2.83
After Ms. Morello goes to Africa, Chris is excited to get a black substitute teacher (Orlando Jones), but his enthusiasm quickly turns to dread when the substitute pressures him to get an A. Julius gets frustrated with Mr. Omar because he keeps borrowing his phone. Tonya keeps getting Drew in trouble by telling Rochelle that he hit her.
37	15	"Everybody Hates Cutting School"	Keith Truesdell	Story by : Kevin A. Garnett & Andrew Orenstein; Teleplay by : Andrew Orenstein	February 19, 2007	217	2.97
When Ms. Morello is away for the day, Chris and Greg cut school so they can see Ghostbusters and end up getting busted. Rochelle helps out Tonya and Drew at their school's book fair, but ends up being a pain in the butt to other parents and the kids. Julius spends a frustrating day trying to get his driver's license renewed at the DMV.
38	16	"Everybody Hates Chain Snatching"	Lev L. Spiro	Rodney Barnes	February 26, 2007	216	2.80
Malvo demands Chris steal a gold chain for him after Chris foils his plans of stealing one. Tonya tries to win tickets to a Billy Ocean concert from a radio station, but she repeatedly fails. Rochelle starts to give Julius the cold shoulder when she finds out that Julius has had another credit card account for the past 15 years.
39	17	"Everybody Hates DJ's"	Jerry Levine	Rodney Barnes	March 19, 2007	213	2.53
Chris becomes a DJ after the neighborhood DJ, Hilly Hill (DJ Quik), is arrested. He borrows Rochelle's James Brown album but accidentally scratches it and has to get the album replaced. Drew asks Julius to take him to a magic show, but Julius secretly does not want to go because he is afraid of rabbits.
40	18	"Everybody Hates Baseball"	Ali LeRoi	Chuck Sklar	March 26, 2007	218	2.68
Chris must decide whether he wants to go to a Mets game with Julius and Drew or to go see Back to the Future with Tasha. Rochelle's slacker brother asks her hairdresser, Vanessa (Jackée Harry), out on a date, and Rochelle tries to talk her out of going. Tonya has been waiting a month to get a picture from the Billy Ocean fan club, but Rochelle realizes she never mailed Tonya's letter. Note: This is one of only two episodes featuring a voice-over done by someone other than Chris, the second being in the episode "Everybody Hates Mother's Day".
41	19	"Everybody Hates Gambling"	Jason Alexander	Aeysha Carr	April 23, 2007	219	3.01
Chris earns extra money when he starts giving Doc tips on picking winners in pro basketball games. Chris earns the nickname "Chrissy the Black" but is soon threatened by the neighborhood bookie, Paulie (Vincent Pastore). Even though he knows that Rochelle hates gambling, Julius goes behind her back to bet on an upcoming basketball game—not realizing it is his son, "Chrissy the Black," giving the tips. Tonya gets tips from Julius on how to beat Drew in checkers.
42	20	"Everybody Hates Dirty Jokes"	Keith Truesdell	Matthew Claybrooks	April 30, 2007	220	2.42
Chris starts telling dirty jokes at school after he secretly listens to his parents' Redd Foxx album. Realizing that her mom, Maxine (Loretta Devine) is becoming lonely, Rochelle tries to set up a blind date for her. Drew is pestered by a girl who keeps telling her friends that he kissed her.
43	21	"Everybody Hates Math"	Ken Whittingham	Devon Shepard	May 7, 2007	221	2.48
Chris has trouble learning algebra, so Rochelle tries to teach him. But when he has problems with her, he goes to his grandmother, a former algebra teacher herself, for help. Julius gets Risky a job helping him deliver newspapers. Drew ends up breaks one of Julius' chair, but Tonya takes the blame and then makes Drew wait on her hand and foot.
44	22	"Everybody Hates the Last Day"	Kelsey Grammer	Rodney Barnes	May 14, 2007	222	2.34
It is the last day of school, and Chris wants revenge on Caruso for making his life miserable. He puts cat food in the heating ducts and everywhere around the school, and blackmails Caruso for it. Julius tries to fix Mr. Omar's clogged drain, but only makes things worse and gets reported to the housing authority. Drew teases Tonya that he is graduating before her. This angers Tonya and she throws ice cream on Drew's gown (which Rochelle explicitly told him not to wear around the house anyway).

=== Season 3 (2007–08) ===
No. overall	No. in season	Title	Directed by	Written by	Original release date	Prod. code	Viewers (millions)
45	1	"Everybody Hates the Guidance Counselor"	Keith Truesdell	Ali LeRoi	October 1, 2007	301	2.58
Chris fails an assessment test and is sent to the guidance counselor (series co-creator Chris Rock), who doesn't have a clue how to help Chris. Julius tries to find a way out of buying the kids new school clothes.
46	2	"Everybody Hates Caruso"	Jerry Levine	Andrew Orenstein	October 8, 2007	302	2.60
Caruso gets beat up by a kid he picked on and abdicates his role as school bully. Unfortunately, the situation makes life even more troublesome for Chris, as everyone else in the school becomes a bully and is vying for Caruso's old post. Julius takes on extra work while he is supposed to be on vacation and tries to hide it from Rochelle.
47	3	"Everybody Hates Driving"	Debbie Allen	Chuck Sklar	October 15, 2007	303	2.61
Julius asks Chris to move the family car across the street, but Chris ends up driving it to school even though he doesn't have a license. Rochelle goes to traffic court to argue about a speeding ticket.
48	4	"Everybody Hates Blackie"	Victor Nelli, Jr.	Adrienne Carter	October 22, 2007	304	2.52
Chris is allowed to get a dog, which Julius names Blackie, after a burglary at the home. Because the TV has been stolen, Tonya and Drew decide to entertain themselves by making prank calls. Note: At the end of this episode, the phrase "Everybody Hates Chris" is said in Spanish.
49	5	"Everybody Hates the Bachelor Pad"	Jerry Levine	Alyson Fouse	October 29, 2007	308	2.44
Chris is left alone in Mr. Omar's apartment when his family comes down with the flu and Mr. Omar leaves for an entire day. With advice from Greg, Chris asks Tasha to come over while Mr. Omar is away. Tonya lies about being sick to avoid failing a quiz she forgot to study for.
50	6	"Everybody Hates Bed-Stuy"	Debbie Allen	Rodney Barnes	November 5, 2007	305	2.45
After joining the writing staff, Chris makes up a story about a serial killer that causes a panic in the community after he is insulted for his writing skills. Rochelle campaigns for Lamar Johnson, a slick city councilman, much to Julius' dismay.
51	7	"Everybody Hates Houseguests"	Keith Truesdell	Frank Sebastiano	November 12, 2007	309	2.32
With his dad out of town, Greg comes to stay at Chris' house and gets special treatment from Rochelle, which upsets Chris. Julius gets a job as a cab driver and takes a passenger named Eddie (Tommy Davidson) on a road trip to Las Vegas for $1000. Unfortunately, Eddie is a bank robber.
52	8	"Everybody Hates Minimum Wage"	Debbie Allen	Aeysha Carr	November 19, 2007	314	2.16
Chris quits his job at Doc's store and gets another job at a Chinese restaurant called Hoo's Hunan because he isn't getting paid minimum wage. Also, Chris embarrasses Greg by telling a girl he likes her which causes the two to fall out. Rochelle becomes a hair model for an upcoming hair show. Julius visits Drew's school in order to find out why he's failing history tests and Greg tries to find the courage to talk to a girl.
53	9	"Everybody Hates the New Kid"	Ted Wass	Alyson Fouse	November 26, 2007	310	2.26
Chris is happy when another black kid named Albert arrives at his school, but Greg worries that Chris will forget about him. Rochelle gets an unexpected tax refund and goes on a shopping spree, but Julius is concerned that the IRS will come and take back the extra cash.
54	10	"Everybody Hates Kwanzaa"	Eyal Gordin	Adrienne Carter	December 10, 2007	311	2.08
For a school assignment, Chris must help Kill Moves find his estranged mother (Phylicia Rashad). Julius decides it's cheaper to celebrate Kwanzaa than Christmas.
55	11	"Everybody Hates the Port Authority"	Ali LeRoi	Ali LeRoi	March 2, 2008	312	1.45
Chris and his family decide to take a trip down South to attend the funeral of Julius' distant relative. Unfortunately, while waiting for the bus at Port Authority, Chris and Julius loses the traveling money that Rochelle gave to them by playing three-card monte.
56	12	"Everybody Hates Bad Boys"	Ali LeRoi	Aeysha Carr	March 9, 2008	306	1.37
Chris adapts from a 'nice guy' into a 'bad boy' when he discovers Tasha likes bad boys. Julius wins a free meal with his family at a fancy restaurant called Domaine et Mer after he wins employee of the month but it comes with unexpected restrictions.
57	13	"Everybody Hates the First Kiss"	Jerry Levine	Aeysha Carr	March 16, 2008	307	1.19
After finding out that Tasha is going to "spin the bottle" parties, Chris is determined to get an invitation to the next party so he can finally experience his first kiss. Rochelle runs into an old boyfriend while she, Tonya and Julius are out for lunch, Julius becomes extremely jealous and asks Tonya to spy on Rochelle and find out whether she still has feelings for her ex. Mr. Omar borrows five dollars from Drew, not realizing that Drew is deadly serious about getting his money back.
58	14	"Everybody Hates Easter"	Jerry Levine	Alyson Fouse	March 23, 2008	320	0.99
When Tasha breaks up with her boyfriend, Chris is more than happy to step in and serve as her escort for the Easter Pageant, but first he has to figure out how to be in two places at the same time without his mother finding out. Rochelle is confident that she'll win the Easter Pageant Hat-Off competition for the fourth year in a row, but she has to up her game after finding out that the church's newest member intends to take away her title. Julius pretends that he has to work on Easter so that he can stay home and watch baseball while the rest of the family is at church.
59	15	"Everybody Hates Gretzky"	Jerry Levine	Andrew Orenstein	March 30, 2008	315	1.39
In an attempt to keep Drew, out of further trouble, Chris reluctantly agrees to skip school and accompany Drew on a mission to find his idol, hockey great Wayne Gretzky. Tonya was supposed to go on a school trip to Philadelphia, which was unsuccessful as Julius couldn't afford to take her. So she stays at home and purposely gets on Julius' nerves. NHL players Willie O'Ree and Kevin Weekes appear in the episode.
60	16	"Everybody Hates the BFD"	Jerry Levine	Alessia Costantini	April 6, 2008	316	0.96
Chris is so desperate to raise the funds to go to a Run–DMC concert that he jumps at the chance to participate in Mr. Omar's Black Funeral Directors' (BFD) scholarship fund. When Rochelle injures her arm, she quickly realizes that the longer she's out of commission, the longer she can avoid taking care of Julius and the family.
61	17	"Everybody Hates Ex-Cons"	Debbie Allen	Rodney Barnes	April 13, 2008	318	1.29
Chris attempts to help Malvo, a career criminal who was recently released from jail, turn his life around by going back to high school. Rochelle is alarmed by the parenting skills of one of Tonya's friend's parents (guest star Shar Jackson) and decides to share her wealth of knowledge. A die-hard Dodgers fan, Julius feels betrayed when he finds out Drew is a fan of the Mets. They then bet on the upcoming 3-Game series that the Mets and Dodgers are having.
62	18	"Everybody Hates Earth Day"	Jerry Levine	Adam Lorenzo	April 20, 2008	313	1.14
Chris must come up with a school project for Earth Day, so he decides to collect cans, believing it will be an easy task and something Julius can help him accomplish. When Rochelle is called to school to discuss Tonya's inappropriate behavior, it quickly becomes obvious that Tonya gets her potty mouth attitude from Rochelle.
63	19	"Everybody Hates Being Cool"	Ken Whittingham	Rodney Barnes	April 27, 2008	317	1.30
On a mission to become one of the "cool" kids, Chris is caught with cigarettes and suspended from school. Tonya intercepts the call from Chris' school letting his parents know he has been suspended and decides to charge him to keep her mouth closed. While on suspension, Chris starts to hang out with the cool kids in the neighborhood. In an effort to get even with Julius for keeping a coat given to him by his ex-girlfriend, Rochelle decides to parade around the neighborhood in inappropriate clothing.
64	20	"Everybody Hates the Ninth-Grade Dance"	Ken Whittingham	Ali LeRoi	May 4, 2008	321	1.25
When Chris is the only boy without a date for the 9th-grade dance, Greg suggests he ask out Carrie but when he does, word spreads of the inter-racial couple. Tonya asks Rochelle if she can take ballet lessons. Julius's brother, Ryan (Tony Rock), decides to start an auto parts business and he asks Julius and Drew to join in on the business.
65	21	"Everybody Hates Mother's Day"	Keith Truesdell	Jason M. Palmer	May 11, 2008	319	1.27
When Chris attempts to buy Rochelle expensive perfume as a Mother's Day gift from a store, he discovers he cannot afford it and buys a knock-off from Risky. However, Rochelle breaks out in hives and takes Chris to the store she believes he bought it from. Drew is getting rid of some old junk in order to get enough money to buy Rochelle a gift. After selling it, Drew and Julius find out that an old toy Drew had is worth $150, so they desperately try to get it back. Tonya finds a special deal in a mail where she can buy 8 music records for one cent. Note: This is the second of only two episodes featuring a voice-over done by someone other than Chris.
66	22	"Everybody Hates Graduation"	Jason Alexander	Chuck Sklar	May 18, 2008	322	1.48
Chris' joy at graduating to junior high school is short-lived when he finds out Greg is going to a different school next year, so he tries to raise enough money to go to Greg's school. Rochelle volunteers Drew to be Tonya's partner in "Swan Lake" ballet performance after her partner suffers an ankle injury. Julius's brother Ryan returns and asks him to join in on his illegal mixtape business, which ends up getting Ryan arrested for copyright infringement.

=== Season 4 (2008–09) ===
No. overall	No. in season	Title	Directed by	Written by	Original release date	Prod. code	Viewers (millions)
67	1	"Everybody Hates Tattaglia"	Jerry Levine	Ali LeRoi	October 3, 2008	401	2.11
Chris enters high school and is placed in an all-white homeroom with a rather jerky teacher. Tonya starts working with Rochelle at the local beauty parlor, where her blunt honesty gets her into trouble with customers by telling somebody had a giant mole.
68	2	"Everybody Hates Cake"	Keith Truesdell	Adrienne Carter	October 10, 2008	402	1.70
Chris is asked to tutor an androgynous classmate named Angel (Hector Garcia). Angel tells Chris that he can help Chris get the attention of Maria (Chris's eye candy). Meanwhile Tasha's ex-con mother, Peaches (Tisha Campbell-Martin) asks Rochelle for help to turn her life around. In the end, Greg is kicked out of the Bronx Academy of Science and becomes a nerd again. When Mr. Omar goes away for a week, he asks Drew and Tonya to watch after his goldfish. Note: This is the only episode in the series where the chorus sings "Everybody hates Chris and Greg" at the end.
69	3	"Everybody Hates Homecoming"	Jerry Levine	Frank Sebastiano	October 17, 2008	403	1.79
Chris is thrilled when Jenise Huckstable (Tristin Mays) asks him to the homecoming dance. His nerves begin to get the better of him when Jenise tells him that her father Dr. Clint Huckstable (Orlando Jones) and mother Blair Huxtable (Devika Parikh) want to meet him before the dance. Feeling depressed and miserable after being at The Bronx Academy, Greg goes missing. Drew tries to get Doc to feng shui the store when he takes over Chris' hours. A boy tries to seduce Tonya, which makes James jealous.
70	4	"Everybody Hates the English Teacher"	Seith Mann	Rodney Barnes	October 24, 2008	404	1.82
Chris is assigned to do a book report on Ralph Ellison's Invisible Man, but decides to watch the movie of the same name, and Greg lies that the movie that Chris watched has nothing to do with the book itself. Julius and Rochelle raise Mr. Omar's rent, and Mr. Omar demands that they bring the apartment up to code, as a result, he stays with the family until the repairs are done.
71	5	"Everybody Hates My Man"	Jerry Levine	Warren Hutcherson	October 31, 2008	405	1.27
In order to be allowed to hang out with the cool kids, Chris decides to help the football team with homework. Meanwhile, Julius begins work collecting dead bodies for Mr. Omar's funeral home.
72	6	"Everybody Hates Doc"	Lev L. Spiro	Luisa Leschin	November 7, 2008	406	1.75
Doc's new girlfriend, Stacy (Robin Givens), makes Chris' life complicated, due to her being way too demanding towards everyone, so he decides that she and Doc should break up. Meanwhile, a bra in Julius' sock drawer makes Rochelle unhappy, making her instantly believe Julius is having an affair.
73	7	"Everybody Hates Snitches"	Anton Cropper	Jason M. Palmer	November 14, 2008	407	1.75
Julius and Rochelle are at a Broadway musical for their anniversary, and Chris witnesses a shooting outside a movie theater when he's supposed to be babysitting Drew and Tonya. When Julius accidentally hits one of the performers, he and Rochelle get thrown out. Note: Julius and Rochelle went to go see a Broadway show called "Showdogs" for their anniversary. The show was a spoof of Andrew Lloyd Webber's "Cats".
74	8	"Everybody Hates Big Bird"	Ted Wass	Adam Lorenzo	November 21, 2008	408	1.68
Chris agrees to go on a date with "Big Bird", the dorkiest girl in school, but only to spare her feelings. Meanwhile, Rochelle hopes for the Jets to win the big football game, whereas Julius bets on the Giants.
75	9	"Everybody Hates James"	Jerry Levine	Luisa Leschin	November 28, 2008	409	2.10
Julius takes marriage advice by watching The Oprah Winfrey Show, but Rochelle misreads his new attitude and believes him to be having an affair. Meanwhile, Chris volunteers for a Big Brother program, only to be assigned to a "little brother".
76	10	"Everybody Hates New Year's Eve"	Ted Wass	Warren Hutcherson	December 12, 2008	411	1.70
Chris wants to spend New Year's Eve in Times Square but cannot go unless he finds a responsible adult to accompany him, and the only available chaperones are the ex-cons Peaches and Malvo. Meanwhile, Julius becomes a local hero when he stops a man from jumping off the George Washington Bridge. Drew and Tonya make a bet to see who can stay up the longest.
77	11	"Everybody Hates Mr. Levine"	Oz Scott	Ali LeRoi	January 9, 2009	410	1.38
Upon learning that she is actually a year younger than she thought, Rochelle adopts a youthful attitude while Chris receives help from a complete stranger named Stan Levine (Steve Landesberg) during a city-wide blackout. Meanwhile, Greg tries to create a new identity apart from his friendship with Chris. Note: This was Steve Landesberg's final acting role before his death in 2010.
78	12	"Everybody Hates Varsity Jackets"	Jerry Levine	Adrienne Carter	January 16, 2009	412	1.41
Chris and Greg want to get varsity jackets to use to impress girls, so they join the wrestling team. Meanwhile, Rochelle goes on a diet by drinking a weight-loss beverage and Julius tries to persuade everyone else to join the diet because it's cheaper than other groceries. Drew starts an all-girls band and reluctantly lets Tonya join the group.
79	13	"Everybody Hates Fake IDs"	Debbie Allen	Rodney Barnes	January 23, 2009	413	1.66
Chris and Greg try to obtain fake IDs in order to attend an age-restricted Fat Boys concert. Meanwhile, Rochelle plans a surprise party for Julius and Drew tries to return a faulty pair of X-ray glasses he received through the mail. Note: On this episode, a variation of the end sting was sung ("Everybody Hates Gene") instead of "Everybody Hates Chris", because of Chris' fake name on the ID.
80	14	"Everybody Hates PSATs"	Keith Truesdell	Frank Sebastiano	January 30, 2009	414	1.74
Chris' efforts to study for a college-entrance exam get sidelined by Rochelle's plans for the family to attend a social event. Meanwhile, Julius wins a contest for a new TV, but soon discovers a hidden catch.
81	15	"Everybody Hates Boxing"	Ken Whittingham	Adam Lorenzo	February 6, 2009	415	1.36
In order to defend himself against Caruso, Chris follows a suggestion from Coach Thurman and takes up boxing. Meanwhile, Julius suspects Rochelle of adultery after he discovers a phone bill with several late-night calls on it and an attractive neighbor (Tamala Jones) flirts with him.
82	16	"Everybody Hates Lasagna"	Debbie Allen	Alison McDonald	March 13, 2009	416	1.46
Chris reluctantly agrees to hold onto a stash of marijuana for a criminal on the run, but he finds it difficult to find an appropriate hiding place that won't get him in trouble. Meanwhile, Vanessa insists that Rochelle learn the beauty salon's new computer system. She enlists the help of Peaches, which does not sit well with Rochelle.
83	17	"Everybody Hates Spring Break"	Jerry Levine	Shawn Thomas	March 20, 2009	421	1.67
Chris test-drives a car and accidentally runs over Greg, who suffers a broken leg and ends up in the hospital. Rochelle cancels her beach vacation plans to care for Greg for a week since his parents are out of town, leaving Julius to entertain Drew and Tonya at the shore where it rains every day. Chris and Greg lie and say someone else hit him who wasn't supposed to be driving.
84	18	"Everybody Hates the Car"	Millicent Shelton	Jason M. Palmer	March 27, 2009	418	1.79
Chris gets a driver's license and buys a car, but then he realizes that having ownership of a car is a huge responsibility. Meanwhile, Rochelle discovers Julius' hidden racing form while searching for her secret cigarette stash and Julius finds Drew's naked lady pen while searching for his racing form.
85	19	"Everybody Hates Back Talk"	Lev L. Spiro	Kristi Korzec	April 3, 2009	419	1.74
Chris takes a stand against Rochelle's strict rules and refuses to do his household chores, as he has to clean up after Drew and Tonya while they watch television. Meanwhile, Mr. Omar believes he is dying, so he blurts out whatever is on his mind.
86	20	"Everybody Hates Tasha"	Debbie Allen	Adrienne Carter	April 24, 2009	420	1.70
Chris asks Tasha to be his girlfriend and is shocked when she agrees, but he soon learns that having a girlfriend means sacrificing most of his free time. Meanwhile, Rochelle finds out that Julius was married once before. Matters are further complicated she realizes he isn't yet legally divorced from the first wife.
87	21	"Everybody Hates Bomb Threats"	Keith Truesdell	Sarah Jane Cunningham & Suzie V. Freeman	May 1, 2009	417	1.68
Chris calls in a bomb threat to school so he can delay his William Henry Harrison's inauguration speech that he must give in history class as a punishment for disrupting it with his "yo momma" jokes, but he finds out he just had to memorize it as Chris follows his homeroom teacher around, even on the phone to say the whole speech to him. Meanwhile, Rochelle starts having problems of her own after a disgruntled customer named Tallulah Lafitte (Vanessa A. Williams) puts a voodoo hex on her; only if she gives Tallulah a refund can the hex be undone. While watching the news, it seems that a school was blown up right after Chris had called in the bomb threat.
88	22	"Everybody Hates the G.E.D."	Ali LeRoi	Story by : Adam Lorenzo; Teleplay by : Don Reo	May 8, 2009	422	1.67
In the series finale, Chris is told that if he is late to school one more time, he'll have to repeat grade 10. This happens 2 days later inspiring him to drop out of school and get a job. At first Rochelle is against the idea but she decides to support him once Julius backs Chris up. Chris takes the G.E.D. test and if he passes he will be able to get a job. Meanwhile Drew wants to perform at the Apollo for amateur night but later realizes he doesn't have talent as all he does is bang drumsticks on a bucket with a talented dancing girl and Tonya is graduating from grade 6. Chris then has his last moment with Greg before Caruso comes to confess to and befriend Chris, subjecting Greg to bullying for the rest of his school life. In the last scene, Rochelle, Drew and Tonya meet Chris at the restaurant or the diner and are waiting for Julius, The episode ends with the entire family sitting around a restaurant table, listening to and singing along with Bon Jovi's "Livin' on a Prayer" and eating fried crust. Julius brings the G.E.D. results and the last thing said is Chris asking, "What's it say?". The scene then blacks out, ending the series. Note: This is the fifth episode that does not end with the familiar lyric "Everybody Hates Chris". The first four are "Everybody Hates the Pilot", "Everybody Hates Sausage", "Everybody Hates Fake IDs" and "Everybody Hates Corleone". The ending is a spoof of The Sopranos series finale. When Julius parks his truck, there is a camera close-up of the 735 painted on his truck. This suggests Chris's G.E.D. score, which would be passing as the test is scored out of 800.
