= Mike Estime =

American actor and comedian

- Born: Michael Estime
- Occupations: Actor, comedian
- Years active: 2001-Present

Mike Estime is an American actor, comedian, writer and director. He has made appearances in the films Harbinger Down and Last Holiday (2006) and the sitcom Talk to Me (2000) as well as the hit television series Everybody Hates Chris as Risky, a street entrepreneur, and on the BET comedy show Comic View. More recently, he appeared in a 2021 episode of The Neighborhood, starring Cedric the Entertainer.

On Comic View, he has made jokes referring to the Haitian culture and his Haitian father.

Estime spent time working with Carnival Cruise Lines as their headline comedian at 'the Punchliner Comedy Club'. He also runs a biweekly podcast called TMFH (This Muthaf**ka Here) along with a web series called All For Love.

== Credits ==
=== Actor ===
Title	Project type	Year	Character
Talk To Me	TV series	2000	Cam
The Bernie Mac Show	TV series	2004–2005	Himself
Last Holiday	TV series	2006	Marlon
Laffapalooza	TV series	2006	-
Everybody Hates Chris	TV series	2005–2009	Risky
Go Go Reject	TV short	2010	Tanner
Where The Hell Is Budrow Jackson	Short	2011	Cornbread
Beyond Merritt	TV short	2013	Drug Dealer Manny
Sketchy	TV series	2014	Himself
All for Love	TV short	2015	Jerry Pierre
All for Love: HopScotch	Film	2015	Jerry Pierre
All for Love: Meet the Pierres	TV series	2015	Jerry Pierre
Inanimate		2015	
Dock		2015	
The Big Leaf	TV film	2015	"Earth" Stone
Hand of God	TV series	2015–2017	Terrell
All for Love: The Dance	TV short	2016	Jerry Pierre
All for Love	TV film	2016	Jerry Pierre
Uncharted 4: A Thief's End	Video game	2016	Additional voices (voiceover)
The Neighborhood	TV series	2021–2022	Victor
The Upshaws	TV series	2021–2026	Tony
Everbody Still Hates Chris	TV series	2024	Risky (voice)

=== Writer ===
Title	Project type	Year
The Funny Spot	TV series	2008
BET Comicview	TV series	2008
All for Love	TV short	2015
All For Love: The Dance	TV short	2016
All For Love	TV film	2016

=== Producer ===
Title	Project type	Year	Role
All For Love	TV short	2015	Executive producer
All For Love: HopScotch	TV short	2015	Executive producer
All For Love: Meet The Pierres	TV series	2015	Executive producer
All For Love: The Dance	TV short	2016	Producer
All For Love	TV film	2016	Executive producer

=== Director ===
Title	Project type	Year	Role
All for Love	TV short	2015	Director
All for Love	TV film	2016	Director
