= Jeris Lee Poindexter =

American actor

- Born: December 22, 1950 (age 75)
- Other name: Jeris L. Poindexter
- Occupations: Actor, comedian, and musician
- Years active: 1984–present

Jeris Lee Poindexter (born December 22, 1950) is an American actor, comedian and musician. He is known for his recurring role as Kill Moves on the UPN/The CW sitcom Everybody Hates Chris.

He played homeless men in several TV series, including Fastlane, Mr. Box Office, Law & Order: LA, and Black Jesus.

== Filmography ==
=== Film ===
Year	Title	Role	Notes
1985	The Color Purple	Jook Joint Patron	
1986	Nothing in Common	Harvey	
1987	Slam Dance	Party Cop	
1988	Sunset	Cleaning Man	
1991	The Doctor	Doctor in Hallway	
1994	Murder at Midnight	Victim #4	
1995	Panther	Black Cop	
1995	Devil in a Blue Dress	Alphonso Jenkins	
1996	Dear God	Local Newscaster	
1996	Set It Off	Pete Rodney	
1997	Con Air	Watts	
1998	Caught Up	Larry	
2000	Hot Boyz	Preacher	
2001	The Wash	Mr. Francis	
2003	The Job	Walt	
2004	Soul Plane	Giselle's Father	
2004	Land of Plenty	Charles	
2006	Akeelah and the Bee	Steve	
2006	Shifted	Marcos	
2008	The Hustle	Benny	
2009	The Nation	Wilfred	
2009	Dough Boys	Thoms	
2011	Footprints	Homeless Man	
2012	The Little Guy	Deacon	
2012	Chilly Christmas	Schmidt	
2015	Insidious: Chapter 3	Harry	
2019	I Hate Kids	Attendant	
2019	Princess of the Row	Street Cleaner	

=== Television ===
Year	Title	Role	Notes
1984	American Playhouse	Lonnie	Episode: "The Killing Floor"
1986	Child's Cry	Social Worker #5	Television film
1986	Starman	Orderly	Episode: "Fever"
1987	Ohara	Pawn Shop Employee	Episode: "Jesse"
1987	227	Hombre	Episode: "Low Noon"
1988	Hunter	Flowers	Episode: "The Bogota Million"
1988	Vietnam War Story	Schiff	Episode: "R & R"
1988	Killer Instinct	Cop	Television film
1988	Head of the Class	Eddie	Episode: "Get a Job"
1989	China Beach	Sergeant	Episode: "Tet '68"
1989	Matlock	Cultist #1	Episode: "The Cult"
1989	Doogie Howser, M.D.	Driver	Episode: "Pilot"
1989	Cross of Fire	Royal Eames	Television film
1990	Family of Spies	Agent Jax	2 episodes
1990	Tales from the Crypt	Noah	Episode: "'Til Death"
1990	Equal Justice	Number Two	Episode: "Promises to Keep"
1993	There Are No Children Here	Defense Attorney	Television film
1994	Viper	Johnny	Episode: "Wheels of Fire"
1994	Seinfeld	Man	Episode: "The Couch"
1994–1996	Martin	Mr. Booker	3 episodes
1995	Deadly Games	Janitor	Episode: "The Practical Joker"
1996	EZ Streets	Scrap Man	Episode: "Every Picture Tells a Story"
1996	The Wayans Bros.	Dewey	Episode: "Episode: "The Return of the Temptones"
1996–2005	NYPD Blue	Various roles	3 episodes
1997	Soldier of Fortune, Inc.	Sergeant Reneau	Episode: "Power Corrupts"
1997	Night Stand with Dick Dietrick	Barry Black	Episode: "Pushy Parents"
2000	The Parkers	Homeless Man	Episode: "Turkey Day Blues"
2000, 2001	ER	Rafe / Nate	2 episodes
2001	The District	Property Clerk	Episode: "Melt Down"
2001	Citizen Baines	Zoo Worker	Episode: "Lost and Found"
2002	The Agency	Dorman	Episode: "Home Grown"
2002, 2004	The Division	Milton	2 episodes
2003	Fastlane	Homeless Guy	Episode: "Monster"
2003	Boston Public	Eddie Clemens	Episode: "Chapter Sixty-Four"
2003	The Handler	Man	Episode: "Street Boss"
2003	Wanda at Large	Driver	Episode: "Hurricane Hawkins"
2004	The Bernie Mac Show	Bum	Episode: "Go Bernie, It's Your Birthday"
2004	CSI: NY	George Albergo	Episode: "Creatures of the Night"
2005	Strong Medicine	Old man / mechanic	Episode: "Implants, Transplants and Cuban Aunts"
2005–2009	Everybody Hates Chris	Kill Moves	34 episodes
2006	CSI: Crime Scene Investigation	Grandpa Calvin	Episode: "Poppin' Tags"
2006	The Unit	Robot Operator	Episode: "Morale, Welfare and Recreation"
2007	Women's Murder Club	Martin	Episode: "Welcome to the Club"
2007–2010	Saving Grace	Pop / Pup	4 episodes
2008	Monk	Eddie	Episode: "Mr. Monk Takes a Punch"
2009	Eleventh Hour	Security Guard	Episode: "Electro"
2009	Southland	Mr. Tillman	Episode: "Two Gangs"
2009, 2010	The Middle	Janitor / Old Man	2 episodes
2010	Hawthorne	Pete	Episode: "A Mother Knows"
2010	The Mentalist	Manager	Episode: "Red Carpet Treatment"
2010	Law & Order: LA	Homeless Man	Episode: "Pasadena"
2011	Parks and Recreation	George	Episode: "Media Blitz"
2011	Private Practice	Mechanic	Episode: "What We Have Here..."
2012	Awake	Homeless Man	Episode: "The Little Guy"
2012	Rizzoli & Isles	Jeremy	Episode: "Home Town Glory"
2012	Mr. Box Office	Homeless Man	Episode: "Marcus Drops a Bomb"
2012	New Girl	Cop	Episode: "Santa"
2013	The Mindy Project	Carriage Driver	Episode: "Bunk Bed"
2013	Grey's Anatomy	Mr. Strickland	Episode: "Perfect Storm"
2013	Castle	Older Man	Episode: "Time Will Tell"
2013	About a Boy	Homeless Patient	Episode: "About a Buble"
2014	Agents of S.H.I.E.L.D.	Older Man	Episode: "Nothing Personal"
2014	Californication	Man at the Hospital	Episode: "Faith, Hope, Love"
2014	Black Jesus	Homeless Dude #1	Episode: "Love Thy Enemy Part 2"
2015	How to Get Away with Murder	James Smalley	Episode: "Mama's Here Now"
2015	Scandal	Freddy Brock	Episode: "Yes"
2015	Fifty & Over Club	Benny	Television film
2016	The People v. O. J. Simpson	Watson Calhoun	7 episodes
2016	Transparent	George	Episode: "When the Battle Is Over"
2016	Adam Ruins Everything	Homeless Man	2 episodes
2016	Life in Pieces	Resident #2	Episode: "Eyebrow Anonymous Trapped Gem"
2017	The Mick	Elderly Black Man	Episode: "The Baggage"
2017	Fresh Off the Boat	Go Fish Player	Episode: "Driving Miss Jenny"
2017	Wisdom of the Crowd	Don	Episode: "Clear History"
2018	Baskets	Old Guy	Episode: "Finding Eddie"
2018	This Is Us	Mr. Baldwin	Episode: "This Big, Amazing, Beautiful Life"
2018	The Neighborhood	Tommy	Episode: "Welcome to the Stolen Sneakers"
2019, 2020	Tacoma FD	Elderly Man	2 episodes
2022	The Chi	Old Man	Episode: "On Me"
2024	Everybody Still Hates Chris	Kill Moves (voice)	1 episode
