= Everybody Still Hates Chris =

American animated television sitcom

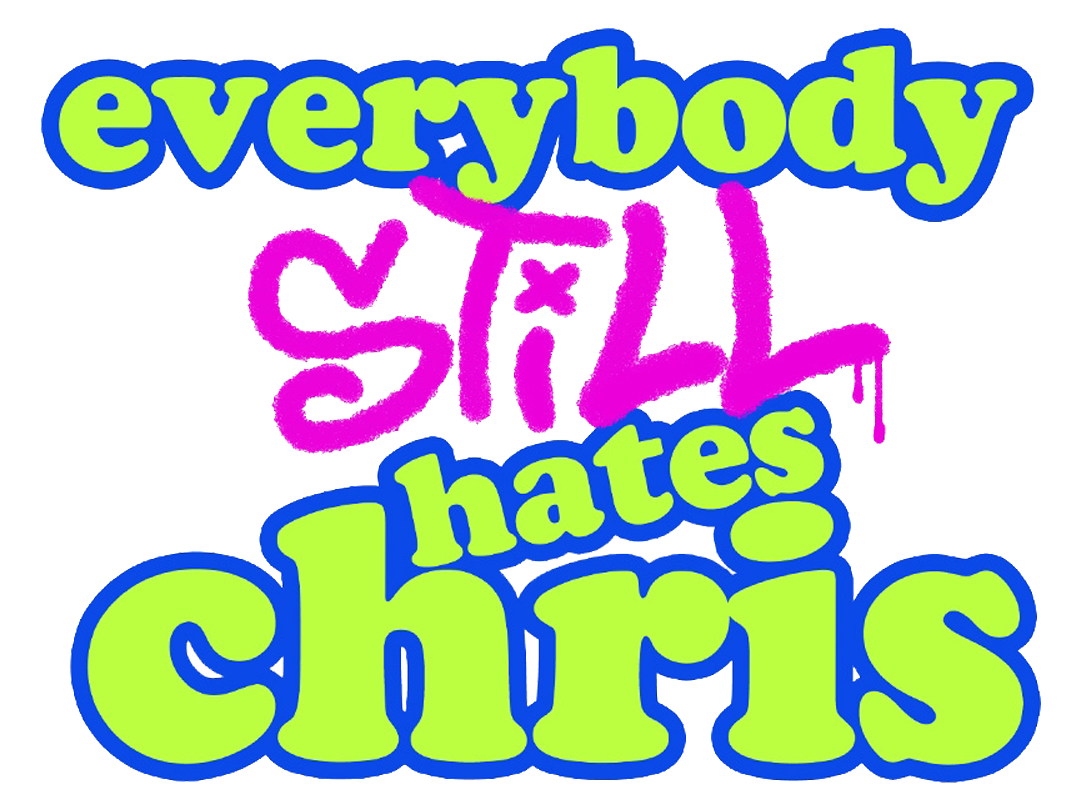
- Genre: Animated sitcom
- Based on: Everybody Hates Chris by: Chris Rock; Ali LeRoi
- Developed by: Sanjay Shah
- Showrunner: Sanjay Shah
- Voices of: Chris Rock; Tim Johnson Jr.; Terry Crews; Tichina Arnold; Terrence Little Gardenhigh; Ozioma Akagha; Gunnar Sizemore
- Narrated by: Chris Rock
- Music by: Frank Ciampi
- Country of origin: United States
- Original language: English
- No. of seasons: 1
- No. of episodes: 20

Production
- Executive producers: Chris Rock; Sanjay Shah; Ali LeRoi; Michael Rotenberg; Dave Becky; Chris Prynoski; Shannon Prynoski; Antonio Canobbio; Ben Kalina
- Producers: Terry Crews; Tichina Arnold; Tyler James Williams (episode 1)
- Editor: Ryan Scott Wick
- Running time: 21 minutes
- Production companies: Titmouse, Inc.; CR Enterprises; Sanjay Shah Productions; 3 Arts Entertainment; CBS Eye Animation Productions; CBS Studios; Paramount Television Studios

Original release
- Network: Comedy Central
- Release: September 25, 2024 – April 10, 2025

Everybody Still Hates Chris is an American animated sitcom. It is a sequel to the live-action sitcom Everybody Hates Chris. It was developed by its showrunner, Sanjay Shah. Everybody Still Hates Chris premiered on September 25, 2024, on Comedy Central. It picks up where the original series ended and it tells the story of comedian Chris Rock's childhood and adolescence in Brooklyn, New York, during the 1980s.

== Background and release ==
In March 2021, an animated series was announced to be in development with Chris Rock returning as narrator. Four months later, Sanjay Shah, executive producer and co-showrunner of Central Park, was reported to be writing and producing the animated series. Shah initially turned down the project until he learned that it would be animated, a format which allowed for new comedic opportunities. According to Shah, "I would not have pursued this if it was a live-action reboot, it was the animated part that was appealing." He recruited writers from the original show as well as new writers, for a multitude of perspectives.

In August 2022, it was reported the animated series would be titled Everybody Still Hates Chris. The series is a revival and picks up where the series finale of Everybody Hates Chris left off. In June 2024, casting was announced with Rock, Crews and Arnold reprising their roles, and new additions including Tim Johnson Jr. as Young Chris, Ozioma Akagha as Tonya, Terrence Little Gardenhigh as Drew, and Gunnar Sizemore as Greg due to the original actors who played them having since grown up. Jackée Harry, Tisha Campbell, Ernest Lee Thomas, Antonio Fargas, Kevontay Jackson, Jacqueline Mazzarella, Jeris Lee Poindexter, Paul Ben-Victor, Mike Estime, Earthquake, and Loretta Devine would also reprise their character roles as voice actors in the animated series as well.

Rock and Shah did not want to proceed on the new project without the involvement of Crews and Arnold, who also serve as producers. The actors were happy to reprise their roles, both feeling that the original show still had stories to tell. Crews was initially hesitant to join the animated series due to concerns about how his character would look, although he was ultimately satisfied with the design.

The series received a 20-episode order, and premiered on Comedy Central on September 25, 2024, with the first 10 episodes being released on Paramount+ on May 7, 2025.

== Cast ==
=== Main ===
- Chris Rock as Narrator
- Tim Johnson Jr. as Chris Rock
- Terry Crews as Julius Rock
- Tichina Arnold as Rochelle Rock
- Terrence Little Gardenhigh as Drew Rock
- Ozioma Akagha as Tonya Rock
- Gunnar Sizemore as Greg Wuliger

=== Recurring ===
- Jackée Harry as Vanessa
- Tisha Campbell as Juanita "Peaches" Clarkson
- Ernest Lee Thomas as Mr. Omar
- Antonio Fargas as Doc Harris
- Kevontay Jackson as Jerome
- Jacqueline Mazarella as Principal Vivian Morello
- Jeris Lee Poindexter as Edgar "Kill Moves" Devereaux
- Paul Ben-Victor as Mr. Thurman
- Mikey Kelley as Joey Caruso
- Paulina Singer as Tasha Clarkson
- Todd Bridges as Jimmy "Monk" Harris
- Mike Estime as Richard "Risky"

=== Guest ===
- Busta Rhymes as Graffiti "Orbit"
- Ayo Edebiri as Ducky/Alice/Biker Gang Lady
- Bell Biv DeVoe as Street Gang "The Lo-Heads"/Singing Trio "Randy Wat's Sons"
- Sally Jessy Raphael as Herself
- Gabriel Iglesias as Romeo
- Chris Rock as Pookie (crossover cameo, episode 2)
- Earthquake as Uncle Mike
- Nicole Byer
- Loretta Devine as Maxine
- Monét X Change as Titney Houston
- Jaida Essence Hall, Latrice Royale, and Vanessa Vanjie Mateo as Drag Queens
- Vincent Martella as Rick D.
- Jessica Lowe
- Ron Funches
- Laraine Newman
- Cree Summer
- David Herman

== Episodes ==
| No. | Title | Directed by | Written by | Original release date | Prod. code | Viewers (millions) |
|---|---|---|---|---|---|---|
| 1 | "Everybody Still Hates the G.E.D." | Kelly Jones | Sanjay Shah | September 25, 2024 | 101 | N/A |
Continuing off the plot of "Everybody Hates the G.E.D.", Chris and his family discover he failed his G.E.D. and must repeat the 10th grade. To protect himself from being bullied, Chris pretends to be in a gang. The plan works at first, but it backfires as Principal Morello expels him from school. He tries to fool Julius and Rochelle by pretending to go to school, but he's ultimately discovered. Learning of Chris' struggles at school and unable to have his GED test regraded, Rochelle and Julius go to Principal Morello and threaten to sue the school for the racial prejudice Chris went through. Not wanting to deal with any legal consequences, Principal Morello reinstates Chris back to school and places him in the 11th grade. Afterwards, Chris is reassured by Rochelle and Julius they'll be there for him no matter what.
| 2 | "Everybody Still Hates Block Parties" | Traci Honda | Ben Dougan | September 25, 2024 | 102 | N/A |
It's time for Bed–Stuy's annual block party, where Chris tries to hook up with Tasha while Julius teaches him to be a man. Rochelle tries to maintain her role of having the best mac and cheese, and Drew and Tonya watch over the kids of the block, resulting in one falling into a manhole cover, while Greg also comes to enjoy the block party.
| 3 | "Everybody Still Hates Drew's Brother" | Geoffrey Johnson | Meredith Dawson | October 2, 2024 | 103 | N/A |
Chris gains popularity at school through his identity as Drew's Brother.
| 4 | "Everybody Still Hates the KKK" | Geoffrey Johnson | Edgar Momplaisir | October 2, 2024 | 104 | N/A |
Chris sees the KKK and Rochelle schools him in her "You Ain't White Academy."
| 5 | "Everybody Still Hates Cheat Codes" | Traci Honda | Matt Marshall | October 9, 2024 | 105 | N/A |
Chris debates using a cheat code to win a free Nintendo Entertainment System.
| 6 | "Everybody Still Hates Halloween" | Kelly Jones | Matt Claybrooks | October 9, 2024 | 106 | N/A |
Chris spends Halloween at a church event hoping to hook up with Tasha.
| 7 | "Everybody Still Hates Breakdancing" | Geoffrey Johnson | Rae Sanni | October 16, 2024 | 107 | N/A |
Chris, Drew and Greg start a breakdancing club to get out of dodgeball in gym.
| 8 | "Everybody Still Hates Jackie Robinson" | Traci Honda | Jonterri Gadson | October 16, 2024 | 108 | N/A |
Chris enlists Tonya to help him break up with a girl.
| 9 | "Everybody Still Hates Bullies" | Brian Mainolfi | Austen Faggen & Terrell Lawrence | October 23, 2024 | 109 | N/A |
Chris gets a gig DJing at a drag ball and develops "drag queen eyes".
| 10 | "Everybody Still Hates Career Tests" | Geoffrey Johnson | Ava Tramer | October 23, 2024 | 110 | N/A |
Chris and Greg tape over a porno rented from Caruso and must replace it.
| 11 | "Everybody Still Hates Down South" | Brian Mainolfi | Edgar Momplaisir | April 10, 2025 (Paramount+ Brazil) | 111 | N/A |
| 12 | "Everybody Still Hates White Saviors" | Traci Honda | Ben Dougan | April 10, 2025 (Paramount+ Brazil) | 112 | N/A |
| 13 | "Everybody Still Hates Town Rivalries" | Hannah Friesen | Meredith Dawson | April 10, 2025 (Paramount+ Brazil) | 113 | N/A |
| 14 | "Everybody Still Hates Cars" | Traci Honda | Matt Marshall | April 10, 2025 (Paramount+ Brazil) | 114 | N/A |
| 15 | "Everybody Still Hates Hell" | Brian Mainolfi | Matt Claybrooks | April 10, 2025 (Paramount+ Brazil) | 115 | N/A |
| 16 | "Everybody Still Hates a Mack Daddy" | Hannah Friesen | Austen Faggen & Terrell Lawrence | April 10, 2025 (Paramount+ Brazil) | 116 | N/A |
| 17 | "Everybody Still Hates Rap" | Brian Mainolfi | Jonterri Gadson | April 10, 2025 (Paramount+ Brazil) | 117 | N/A |
| 18 | "Everybody Still Hates Snitching" | Eddie Rosas | Rae Sanni | April 10, 2025 (Paramount+ Brazil) | 118 | N/A |
| 19 | "Everybody Still Hates Nagging" | Hannah Friesen | Chuck Sklar & Gillian Bissonnette | April 10, 2025 (Paramount+ Brazil) | 119 | N/A |
| 20 | "Everybody Still Hates Love" | Brian Mainolfi | Ava Tramer | April 10, 2025 (Paramount+ Brazil) | 120 | N/A |
