= Tequan Richmond =

American actor

- Born: October 30, 1992 (age 33); Burlington, North Carolina, U.S.
- Other name: T-Rich
- Occupation: Actor
- Years active: 2002–present

Tequan Richmond (/təˈkwɑːn/; born October 30, 1992), also known as T-Rich, is an American actor best known for playing Drew Rock on the UPN/CW sitcom Everybody Hates Chris. Richmond played Ray Charles Jr. (son of singer and musician Ray Charles) in the motion picture Ray, and in the soap opera General Hospital on ABC, he portrayed TJ Ashford.

== Career ==
In 2001, Richmond moved to Los Angeles, California, not intending to become an actor. He appeared in magazine ads such as Sports Illustrated, Reader's Digest, Newsweek, and National Geographic, as well as a national Nestlé print ad. Richmond made his 2013 Sundance Film Festival debut with a performance as Beltway sniper Lee Boyd Malvo in Blue Caprice. The film sold to Sundance Select/IFC Films and opened New Directors/New Films Festival at MoMA in 2013. The film had a fall 2013 theater release.

Richmond also was one of six hosts for children's TV shows on Toon Disney and has had guest starring roles on CBS's Cold Case, CSI: Crime Scene Investigation, Private Practice, Detroit 1-8-7, Memphis Beat, Love That Girl and Numb3rs as well as Lifetime's Strong Medicine and FX's The Shield. He has co-starred on NBC's ER, Showtime's Weeds, and Fox's MADtv.

While starring on Everybody Hates Chris, in 2008, Richmond appeared on the Tide brand commercial with a voice-over by MC Lyte.

Richmond appeared in the music video "Hate It Or Love It" as young Game by rappers 50 Cent and the Game.

== Filmography ==
=== Television ===
Year	Title	Role	Notes
2002	ER	Boy	Episode: "Chaos Theory"
2003	CSI: Crime Scene Investigation	Tramelle Willis-Tombs	Episode: "Lucky Strike"
2003	The Law and Mr. Lee	Andre Lee	CBS Pilot
2003	Mad TV	Tyson	Episode: "December 20, 2003"
2004	Cold Case	R.J. Holden	Episode: "The Plan"
2005	The Shield	Lionel	Episode: "Bang"
2005	Strong Medicine	Shay Williams	Episode: "Clinical Risk"
2005–2009	Everybody Hates Chris	Drew Rock	Series Regular
2008	Numbers	Bishop	Episode: "Checkmate"
2009	Weeds	Teenager	Episode: "Wonderful Wonderful"
2010	Detroit 1-8-7	Appleman	Episode: "Home Invasion/Drive-By"
2011	Private Practice	Tyler	Episode: "A Step Too Far"
2011	Love That Girl!	Gilbert	Episode: "We Are Family, Part 2"
2011	Memphis Beat	Jesse	Episode: "Body of Evidence"
2012	Mr. Box Office	Anthony	Episode: "Pilot"; Episode: "Somebody's Watching Me"
2012–2018	General Hospital	TJ Ashford	Recurring Role
2016	Ringside	TC	Television Movie
2018	All Night	Christian Fulner	Series Regular
2018	The Unsettling	Connor	Series Regular
2019–2020	Boomerang	Bryson	Series Regular

=== Film ===
Year	Title	Role
2004	Ray	Ray Charles Jr.
2006	The Celestine Prophecy	Basketball Player
2013	Blue Caprice	Lee Boyd Malvo
2013	House Party: Tonight's the Night	Chris Johnson
2017	Nowhere, Michigan	David
2018	Savage Youth / Thriller	Gabe as Andre Nixon
2024	Brewster's Millions: Christmas	Big TY

== Awards and nominations ==
List of awards and nominations for Tequan Richmond
Year	Award	Category	Work	Result	Ref.
2014	Black Reel Awards	Best Breakthrough Performance, Male	Blue Caprice	Nominated	
2014	Black Reel Awards	Best Supporting Actor	Blue Caprice	Nominated	
2014	NAACP Image Award	Outstanding Actor in a Daytime Drama Series	General Hospital	Nominated	
2015	Daytime Emmy Award	Outstanding Younger Actor in a Drama Series	General Hospital	Nominated	
2016	Daytime Emmy Award	Outstanding Younger Actor in a Drama Series	General Hospital	Nominated	
2017	Daytime Emmy Award	Outstanding Younger Actor in a Drama Series	General Hospital	Nominated	
