= Vincent Martella =

American actor (born 1992)

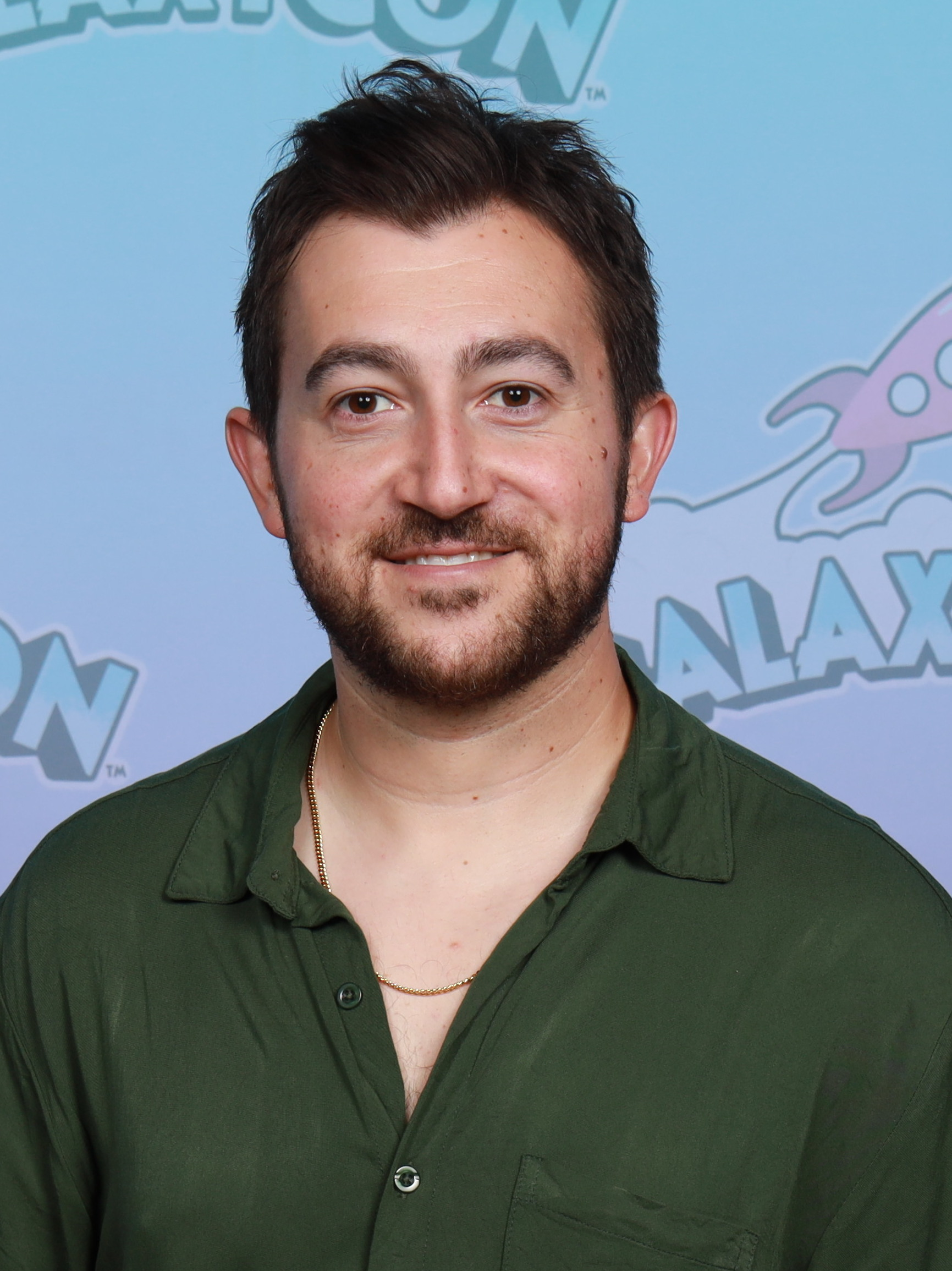
- Martella at the 2025 GalaxyCon Richmond
- Born: Vincent Michael Martella; October 15, 1992 (age 34); Rochester, New York, U.S.
- Education: DeLand High School; University of Florida (BBA)
- Occupations: Actor; singer
- Years active: 2000–present
- Musical career
- Genre: Pop
- Instruments: Vocals; piano
- Website: www.vincentmartella.com

Vincent Michael Martella (born October 15, 1992) is an American actor and singer. He is best known for voicing Phineas Flynn on the Disney Channel animated series Phineas and Ferb (2007–present). Martella is also known for his role as Greg Wuliger on the UPN/CW series Everybody Hates Chris (2005–2009), and for voicing Hope Estheim in the 2010 video game Final Fantasy XIII and its sequels Final Fantasy XIII-2 (2011) and Lightning Returns: Final Fantasy XIII (2013).

== Early life ==
Martella was born in Rochester, New York, the son of Donna and Michael Martella, and is of Italian descent. His father owns Captain Tony's, a chain of pizzerias. During his childhood, he moved to DeLand, Florida. Martella got into acting after a teacher recommended he get into acting classes. He graduated from DeLand High School in 2011 and studied for an online degree in business through the University of Florida.

== Career ==
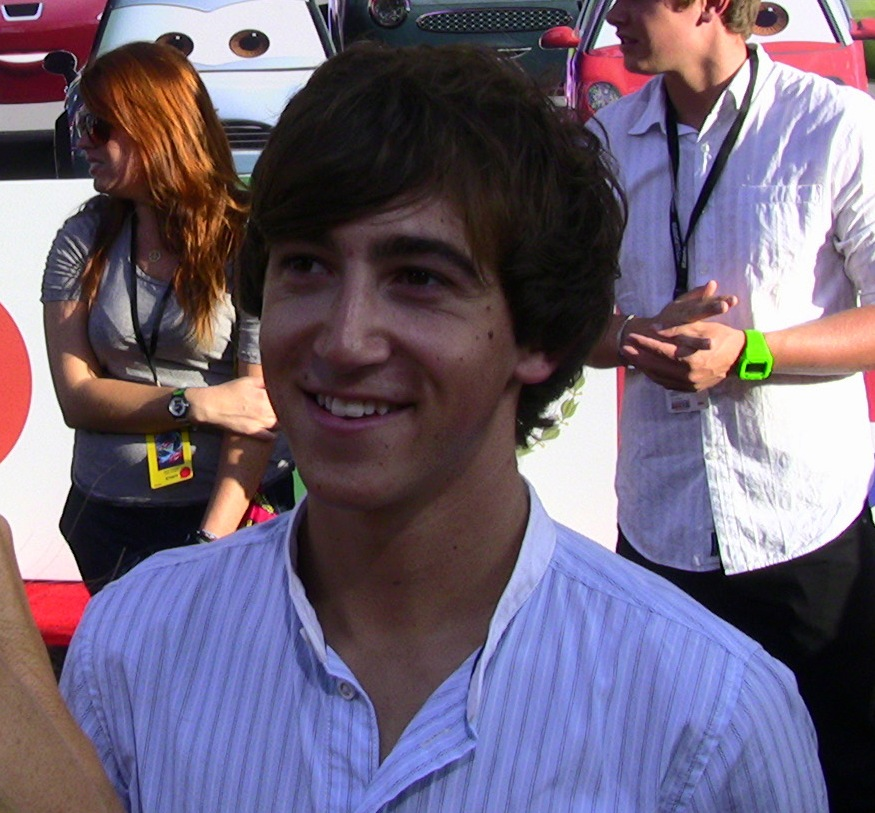
Martella in 2011.

Martella started acting in commercials when he was around 7 years old. He went to acting school in Orlando and acted in local productions. He appeared in the feature film Role Models starring Seann William Scott and Paul Rudd. He has a lead role in the film Bait Shop along with Bill Engvall and Billy Ray Cyrus. He also played Scoop in the Nickelodeon sitcom Ned's Declassified School Survival Guide and Greg in the UPN/CW sitcom Everybody Hates Chris.

He recorded his first album Time Flies By, playing the piano and singing. The album was written and co-produced by Vincent and is available on iTunes.

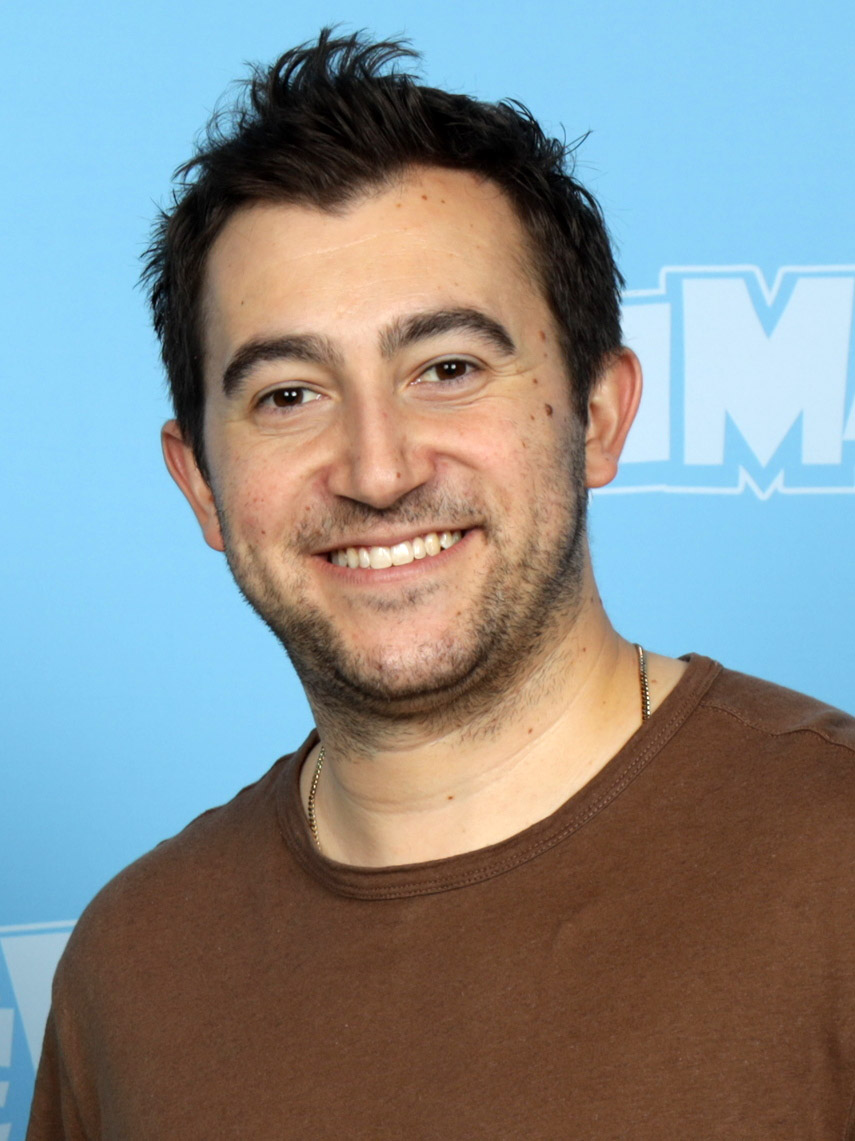
Martella at the 2023 Animate! Columbus.

Martella became known in the voice acting world for providing the voice of Phineas Flynn in the Disney Channel and Disney XD animated series Phineas and Ferb. He also provided the English voice of Hope Estheim, a main character in the 2010 video game Final Fantasy XIII, and reprised his role for Final Fantasy XIII-2. He did the voice of the teenage Jason Todd / Robin for the animated film Batman: Under the Red Hood, in which his younger brother, Alexander, provided the voice for the child version of Todd. Martella reprised his role as Todd in Batman: Death in the Family.

Martella also appeared in the fourth season of The Walking Dead television series as Patrick.

== Personal life ==
Martella splits his time between Los Angeles, California and DeLand, Florida.

On March 31, 2024, Martella posted a photo on Instagram referencing his popularity in Brazil due to Everybody Hates Chris. As a result, Martella went from approximately 200,000 followers to over three million on Instagram in less than a week in 2024. Following the response, he traveled to Brazil and appeared on multiple interviews with Brazilian outlets, including The Noite com Danilo Gentili and Inteligência Ltda.. He was also featured in an advertisement for Burger King.

== Filmography ==
=== Film ===
Year	Title	Role	Notes
2005	Deuce Bigalow: European Gigolo	Billy	
2008	Bait Shop	Scott	
2008	Role Models	Artonius	
2010	Batman: Under the Red Hood	Jason Todd (teenage) / Robin	Voice
2011	Phineas and Ferb: Across the 2nd Dimension	Phineas Flynn / Phineas-2	Voice
2011	Last at Bat	Brother	
2015	Clinger	Robert Klingher	
2015	Riley	Cole	
2015	McFarland, USA	Brandon	
2020	Phineas and Ferb the Movie: Candace Against the Universe	Phineas Flynn	Voice
2020	Batman: Death in the Family	Jason Todd / Robin / Red Robin / Red Hood / Hush	Voice
2028	Untitled third Phineas and Ferb film	Phineas Flynn	Voice

=== Television ===
Year	Title	Role	Notes
2004–2006	Ned's Declassified School Survival Guide	Scoop	3 episodes
2005–2009	Everybody Hates Chris	Greg Wuliger	86 episodes
2007–2015, 2025–present	Phineas and Ferb	Phineas Flynn, Peter the Panda, additional voices	Main role (voice)
2010–2011	Take Two with Phineas and Ferb	Phineas Flynn	Main role (voice)
2011	Love Bites	Josh Ford	Episode: "Sky High"
2012	R. L. Stine's The Haunting Hour	Jean-Louis	Episode: "Poof De Fromage"
2012	The Mentalist	Martin Klubock	Episode: "Something's Rotten in Redmond"
2013–2014	The Walking Dead	Patrick	3 episodes
2016–2019	Milo Murphy's Law	Bradley Nicholson, Phineas Flynn	Recurring role (voice)
2022, 2025–2026	Chibiverse	Phineas Flynn, Rufus	6 episodes (voice)
2023	Swift Spark and the Defense Five	James Riverdale	Voice
2024–present	Everybody Still Hates Chris	Various voices	5 episodes
2025	Jeopardy!	Phineas Flynn	1 episode (voice)
2025–2026	Cartoonified with Phineas and Ferb	Phineas Flynn	Main role (voice)
2026	Big City Greens	Gio Ravioli	(voice)
2026	Ranma ½	Sentaro Daimonji	English dub (voice)

=== Video games ===
Year	Title	Role	Notes
2009	Phineas and Ferb	Phineas Flynn	
2010	Phineas and Ferb: Ride Again	Phineas Flynn	
2010	Final Fantasy XIII	Hope Estheim	
2010	Disney Channel All Star Party	Phineas Flynn	
2011	Phineas and Ferb: Across the 2nd Dimension	Phineas Flynn, Phineas-2, Peter the Panda	
2012	Final Fantasy XIII-2	Hope Estheim	
2013	Phineas and Ferb: Quest for Cool Stuff	Phineas Flynn	
2013	Disney Infinity	Phineas Flynn	
2014	Lightning Returns: Final Fantasy XIII	Hope Estheim	
2014	Disney Infinity: Marvel Super Heroes	Phineas Flynn	
2015	Disney Infinity 3.0	Phineas Flynn	

== Discography ==
- Time Flies By (2006)

== Awards and nominations ==
Year	Award	Category	Work	Result
2006	Young Artists Awards	Best Performance in a TV Series (Comedy) – Supporting Young Actor	Everybody Hates Chris	Nominated
2008	Young Artists Awards	Best Performance in a TV Series – Supporting Young Actor	Everybody Hates Chris	Nominated
2006	Teen Choice Awards	Teen's Choice TV Sidekick	Everybody Hates Chris	Nominated
