= Jacqueline Mazarella =

American actress

- Occupation: Actress
- Years active: 1994–present

Jacqueline Mazarella is an American actress. She is best known for her role as the racially insensitive Ms. Morello in the UPN/CW sitcom Everybody Hates Chris.

== Filmography ==
Year	Show	Roles	Notes
2005–2009	Everybody Hates Chris	Ms. Vivian Morello	48 episodes
2010	Our Family Wedding	Dress Shop Owner	
2010-2013	Are We There Yet?	Jackie	
2011	The Roommate	Professor	
2015	The Bachelors	Nancy Abernac	
2019	The Morning Show	Trish Marino	Episode: "In the Dark Night of the Soul It's Always 3:30 in the Morning"
2019	Professor Shonku O El Dorado	Professor Emilia Rodriguez	
2024–2025	Everybody Still Hates Chris	Principal Vivian Morello (voice)	
2025	Grey’s Anatomy	Sarah	Episode: "How Do I Live"
