= Claire-Marie Mazarelli de Saint-Chamond =

18th-century French woman of letters

Claire-Marie Mazarelli, marquise de la Vieuville de Saint-Chamond (1731 in Paris – ?) was an 18th-century French woman of letters.

== Biography ==
The daughter of Angel Mazarelli, citizen of the city of Paris from Italy, and Marie-Catherine Mathée, she must defend in court in 1750 against accusations about her birth and manners.

By contract from 1 June 1765, she married in Paris Charles-Louis-Auguste de Vieuville, Marquis de Saint-Chamond, Count of Vienne and Confolens, first Baron of Lyonnais who was a colonel-owner of an infantry regiment. They had a son also named Charles-Louis-Auguste, born 6 June 1766.

== Publications ==
- Letter to Jean-Jacques Rousseau, 1762
- Éloge historique de Maximilien de Béthune, duc de Sully. Benoît Duplain. 1763.
- Éloge de René Descartes, 1765
- Camedris. Duchesne. 1765.
- Les amants sans le sçavoir. Monory. 1771.
- Lettres de Madame la Comtesse de Mal... à Mme la Marquise d'A... 1779.
- À Monsieur Hérault, avocat-général. 1786.

== Bibliography ==
- Aurore Evain; Béatrice Didier; Antoinette Fouque; Mireille Calle-Gruber (2013). "Saint-Chamond, Claire-Marie Mazarelli, marquise de". Le dictionnaire universel des créatrices (in French). Éditions des femmes.
- Fortunée Briquet (1804). Dictionnaire historique, littéraire et bibliographique des Françaises et des étrangères naturalisées en France, connues par leurs écrits ou par la protection qu'elles ont accordée aux gens de lettres, depuis l'établissement de la monarchie jusqu'à nos jours (in French). Gillé.
- "Saint-Chamond, Claire-Marie Mazarelli, Marquise de La Vieuville de (1731–)". Dictionary of Women Worldwide: 25,000 Women Through the Ages. Thomson Gale. 2007.
