= Everybody Hates Chris =

American semi-autobiographical sitcom (2005–2009)

- Genre: Sitcom
- Created by: Chris Rock; Ali LeRoi
- Starring: Terry Crews; Tichina Arnold; Tequan Richmond; Imani Hakim; Vincent Martella; Tyler James Williams
- Narrated by: Chris Rock
- Music by: Marcus Miller
- Country of origin: United States
- Original language: English
- No. of seasons: 4
- No. of episodes: 88 (list of episodes)

Production
- Executive producers: Chris Rock; Ali LeRoi; Michael Rotenberg; Dave Becky; Howard Gewirtz; Don Reo; Jim Michaels
- Production locations: Paramount Studios, Los Angeles, California
- Cinematography: Mark Doering-Powell
- Editors: Earl Watson; James Wilcox; Courtney Carrillo
- Camera setup: Single-camera
- Running time: 21–23 minutes
- Production companies: CR Enterprises; 3 Arts Entertainment; Paramount Network Television; CBS Paramount Network Television

Original release
- Network: UPN
- Release: September 22, 2005 – May 11, 2006
- Network: The CW
- Release: October 1, 2006 – May 8, 2009

Related
- Everybody Still Hates Chris

Everybody Hates Chris is an American semi-autobiographical sitcom created by Chris Rock and Ali LeRoi that originally aired on UPN from 2005 to 2006, and then on The CW until 2009. The series is based loosely on Rock's personal experiences as a teenager living in Bedford–Stuyvesant, Brooklyn, New York City from 1982 to 1987. However, Rock's real-life adolescence took place from 1978 to 1984, as he was born in 1965.

The series' title is a parody of the CBS sitcom Everybody Loves Raymond. It was originally developed to air on Fox before being passed over to UPN. The series was shown on UPN for its first season until it was moved to the CW, where it aired its remaining three seasons. In 2009, Rock announced that the series' ending suited his own past and he felt it was time to end the story. It received acclaim from both critics and audience for its writing, directing, humor, tone, and performances of the cast. In 2024, an animated sequel series was released titled Everybody Still Hates Chris.

== Cast and characters ==
- Tyler James Williams as Chris Rock, a skinny, nerdy, black teenager - portraying Chris Rock in his younger years
- Terry Crews as Julius Rock, Chris' father
- Tichina Arnold as Rochelle Rock, Chris' mother
- Tequan Richmond as Drew Rock, Chris' popular younger brother
- Imani Hakim as Tonya Rock, Chris' spoiled little sister
- Vincent Martella as Greg Wuliger, Chris' schoolmate and friend

== Premise ==
The show is a family sitcom, patterned on Chris Rock's recollection of his teenage years growing up in the 1980s with a wholesome, tight-knit, African-American family, while living in drug-and-gang infested Bedford–Stuyvesant, a neighborhood of Brooklyn, New York, and also attending a cross-town, all-white public junior high school.

The real-life Chris Rock provides intermittent narration throughout the show, at times interjecting his young self's thoughts or sometimes simply recounting the situation he is describing.

Chris's family is firmly dominated by his parents: Julius, a hard-working, frugal laborer who works two jobs, and his wife, Rochelle, a housewife (and later the manager of a beauty salon) and mother.

The series starts just after the parents have moved their children "out of the [low-income housing] projects," and into a more-upscale two-story apartment in Brooklyn's Bedford–Stuyvesant neighborhood—known for its roughness as "Bed-Stuy, do-or-die."

Chris is a skinny, nerdy young teen. His mother decides to send him to a mostly-white school across town ("two bus rides away") in an ethnic-Italian neighborhood to ensure he gets a better education. The school is slyly named "Corleone Junior High School" (an apparent reference to the fictional Corleone mafia family from the movie The Godfather or its real-life parallel, the Corleonesi).

Chris finds the new school difficult to adjust to because of social ostracism and the ire of a red-haired bully named Caruso. Ms. Morello, a well-meaning white teacher, treats Chris with naive, condescending assumptions derived from crude racial/ghetto stereotypes. She later becomes the principal of Chris's high school. The bright spot in school is Chris's best friend, Greg (played by Vincent Martella)—a smaller but similarly nerdy white kid.

At home, Chris is often left in charge of his siblings—his younger-but-bigger brother, Drew, and an ornery little sister, Tonya. Mother Rochelle usually keeps a firm grip on the family, while their exhausted breadwinner father, Julius, struggles to catch sleep between jobs.

Chris interacts with various characters in the neighborhood—diverse personalities based on real people Rock would see as a kid in his community. These personalities include some hoodlums who try to take advantage of him, a demented old homeless man nicknamed Kill Moves, a shrewd, miserly-but-grandfatherly storekeeper named Doc, and Doc's neurotic, paranoid, combat-veteran nephew Monk. For several episodes, an overbearing neighbor lady is played by Whoopi Goldberg, grandmother of Tasha, a pretty girl, next door.

The show—laced with comedy and farce—is primarily about adolescence and family life in inner-city poverty, the determined struggles of good, decent parents to provide a better life and values for their family, and the challenges their children present to them, and to each other. The series is an example of 1980s nostalgia.

== Episodes ==
Season	Episodes	Originally released		
Season	Episodes	First released	Last released	Network
1	22	September 22, 2005	May 11, 2006	UPN
2	22	October 1, 2006	May 14, 2007	The CW
3	22	October 1, 2007	May 18, 2008	The CW
4	22	October 3, 2008	May 8, 2009	The CW

== Syndication ==
The show aired regularly on broadcast TV during the week, and aired on Fox, MyNetworkTV and The CW affiliates. The show started airing on September 7, 2009, on Nick at Nite, becoming the youngest syndicated show on Nickelodeon. The series has since aired on TeenNick, TV One, Up, MTV2, VH1, BET, BET Her, and Fuse, Bounce TV and Laff. The series currently airs on the free-to-air DABL network.

In Brazil, the series premiered on RecordTV in October 2006 and, as of 2026, reruns are still regularly broadcast on Sundays due to its immense popularity in the country.

In Canada, the show has aired on the networks YTV and Much. In the UK, the show formerly aired on Channel 5, Paramount Comedy 1 and Sky Comedy.

In Kenya, the show aired on Kenya Television Network between 2006 and 2009. Between 2006 and 2008, the series used to air on Sunday at 7:35 am. In 2009, the show used to air on the same TV channel on Saturday 7:35 am.

== Reception ==
=== Awards ===
Everybody Hates Chris won NAACP Image Awards for Outstanding Writing in a Comedy Series (for Ali LeRoi), Outstanding Actress in a Comedy Series (for Tichina Arnold), and Outstanding Actor in a Comedy Series (for Tyler James Williams). It has also been nominated for a Golden Globe and three Emmy Awards. In December 2008, Entertainment Weekly listed the Kwanzaa episode from this show as seventh on the magazine's "Must List: 10 Holiday Things We Love."

=== Nielsen stats ===
Season	Time Slot (ET/PT)	Season Premiere	Season Finale	TV Season	Rank	Viewers (in millions)
1	Thursday 8:00 PM	September 22, 2005	May 11, 2006	2005–2006	#120	4.3
2	Sunday 7:00 PM	October 1, 2006	October 8, 2006	2006–2007	#137	2.7
2	Monday 8:00 PM	October 16, 2006	May 14, 2007	2006–2007	#137	2.7
3	Monday 8:00 PM	October 1, 2007	December 10, 2007	2007–2008	#198	2.3
3	Sunday 8:00 PM	March 2, 2008	May 18, 2008	2007–2008	#198	2.3
4	Friday 8:00 PM	October 3, 2008	May 8, 2009	2008–2009	#176	1.7

== Home media ==
All four seasons of Everybody Hates Chris were released on DVD by Paramount (under the label CBS DVD) in Region 1 and Region 2. The complete series was released on DVD on August 18, 2009.

=== Streaming ===
The series is available to stream on Paramount+, Amazon Prime Video (through Paramount+), Hulu, Disney+ (through Hulu), Peacock, and Netflix and can be streamed for free on CW Seed, ITV X, Pluto TV, and Tubi. The series is often streamed with Season 1 incomplete, but Paramount+ and Peacock now have the complete season set. The series is also available to be purchased on the iTunes Store, Google TV, YouTube, and Vudu. In Mexico, the series is available to stream on HBO Max and Amazon Prime Video.

== Influence ==
The Kazakh sitcom Ata-Ana, Bala-Şağa is based on this sitcom, but, instead of moving to Bedford-Stuyvesant, the family moves to the city of Almaty.

== See also ==
- Chris Rock filmography
- Self parody
- Everybody Loves Raymond
- The Wonder Years
- Malcolm in the Middle
- That '70s Show
- The Goldbergs
