= List of General Hospital cast members =

General Hospital is an American television soap opera, airing on ABC. Created by Frank and Doris Hursley, the serial premiered on April 1, 1963. John Beradino, whose career began as an American Major League Baseball player, originated the role of Steve Hardy in the serial's premiere episode and made his final appearance on April 23, 1996, making him one of the longest-serving soap opera actors. The longest-running present cast members are Genie Francis and Kin Shriner, having joined General Hospital as Laura Vining in February and Scott Baldwin in August 1977, respectively. Leslie Charleson, who portrayed Monica Quartermaine from August 17, 1977, to December 21, 2023, was previously the longest-tenured cast member until her death in 2025. Rachel Ames was previously the series' longest-running cast member, portraying Audrey Hardy from 1964 to 2007, and making guest appearances in 2009 and 2013, the latter for the series' fiftieth anniversary. Ames made a special appearance on October 30, 2015. Actress Jacklyn Zeman—who portrayed Bobbie Spencer—joined the serial in December 1977 and remained until her death in May 2023. Actress Jane Elliot, who joined the serial in June 1978 as Tracy Quartermaine, is the third longest-serving actor presently on the cast. The following list is of cast members who are currently on the show: the main and recurring cast members, or those who are debuting, departing, or returning to the serial.

== Cast ==
=== Main cast ===
Main cast members
Actor	Character	Duration
Tabyana Ali	Trina Robinson	2022–present
Troy Lennon Appel	Hudson Parker	2026
Maurice Benard	Sonny Corinthos	1993–present
Alexa Havins Bruening	Lulu Spencer	2024–present
Braedyn Bruner	Emma Scorpio-Drake	2024–present
Steve Burton	Jason Morgan	1991–2012, 2017–2021, 2024–present
Steve Burton	Drew Cain	2017, 2019
Jane Elliot	Tracy Quartermaine	1978–1980, 1989–1993, 1996, 2003–2017, 2019–present
Genie Francis	Laura Collins	1977–1984, 1993–2002, 2006, 2008, 2013, 2015–present
Dean Geyer	Tristan Roberts	2026
Rory Gibson	Michael Corinthos	2025–present
Nancy Lee Grahn	Alexis Davis	1996–present
Nancy Lee Grahn	Lexie	2020
Tanisha Harper	Jordan Ashford	2022–present
Rebecca Herbst	Elizabeth Baldwin	1997–present
Rebecca Herbst	Jessie Brewer	2015
Finola Hughes	Anna Devane	1985–1992, 1995, 2006–2008, 2012–present
Finola Hughes	Liesl Obrecht	2013
Finola Hughes	Alex Marick	2017, 2019–2021
Finola Hughes	Alice	2020
Finola Hughes	Holly Sutton	2022
Finola Hughes	Felicia Scorpio	2023
Brook Kerr	Portia Robinson	2020–present
Brook Kerr	Priscilla Johnson	2020
Katelyn MacMullen	Willow Tait	2018–present
Cameron Mathison	Drew Cain	2021–present
Giovanni Mazza	Giovanni Palmieri	2024–present
Eden McCoy	Josslyn Jacks	2015–present
Eden McCoy	Carly Corinthos	2020
Amanda Setton	Brook Lynn Quartermaine	2019–present
Josh Swickard	Harrison Chase	2018–present
Wil Traval	Jude Jacks	2026
Kelly Thiebaud	Britt Westbourne	2012–2015, 2017–2018, 2020–2023, 2025–present
Kelly Thiebaud	Bertha Halifax	2020
Donnell Turner	Curtis Ashford	2015–present
Kristen Vaganos	Molly Lansing-Davis	2023–present
Kristina Wagner	Felicia Scorpio	1984–2005, 2007–2008, 2012–present
Cynthia Watros	Nina Reeves	2019–present
Cynthia Watros	Virginia Benson	2020
Maura West	Ava Jerome	2013–present
Maura West	Ada Hooke	2020
Sawandi Wilson	Isaiah Gannon	2024–present
Laura Wright	Carly Spencer	2005–present
Laura Wright	Lena Spencer	2015
Laura Wright	Beatrice Eckert	2020
Dominic Zamprogna	Dante Falconeri	2009–present

=== Recurring and guest cast ===
Recurring and guest cast members
Actor	Character	Duration
Bradford Anderson	Damian Spinelli	2006–present
Asher Antonyzyn	Danny Morgan	2023–present
Jens Austin Astrup	Kai Taylor	2024–present
Alimi Ballard	William Baines	2026
Tajh Bellow	TJ Ashford	2018–present
Jonathan Bennett	Joe Fitzpatrick	2026
Charlie Besso	Tobias	2025–present
Ayla Bullington	Avery Corinthos	2026
Bluesy Burke	Charlotte Cassadine	2025–present
Finn Carr	Rocco Falconeri	2022–present
Colin Cassidy	Aiden Spencer	2024–present
Dioni Michelle Collins	Deanna Sirtis	2016–present
Nazneen Contractor	Justine Turner	2024–present
Kendrick Cross	Detective Bennett	2023–present
Daniel Cosgrove	Ezra Boyle	2025–present
Risa Dorken	Amy Driscoll	2016–present
Grady Eldridge	Simon	2026
Mark Engelhardt	Roman Hume	2022–present
Morgan Fairchild	Sydney Chase	1996
Morgan Fairchild	Haven de Havilland	2022–present
Jennifer Field	Jennifer Arden	2021–present
Lily Fisher	Georgie Spinelli	2017–present
Gary James Fuller	James West	2023–present
Kathleen Gati	Liesl Obrecht	2012–present
Kearran Giovanni	Dr. Nichols	2026
Robert Gossett	Marshall Ashford	2021–present
Van Hansis	Lucas Jones	2024–present
Nathaniel Harris	Sergeant Robinson	2006–present
Rick Hearst	Ric Lansing	2002–2009, 2014–2016, 2024–present
Carolyn Hennesy	Diane Miller	2006–present
Lynn Herring	Lucy Coe	1986–2002, 2004, 2012–present
Cyrus Hobi	Yuri	2021–present
Anders Hove	Cesar Faison	1990–1993, 1999–2000, 2012–2014, 2018, 2026 (Note: Hove resumed his portrayal of Cesar Faison during the January 16, 2026, episode, in a voice-over-only portrayal, due to the actor being based in Denmark.)
Blythe Howard	Monet Mitchell	2026
Carly Hughes	Elise Vance	2023–present
Adam Huss	Nikolas Cassadine	2021–present
Jequan Jackson	Quinn	2024–present
Cassandra James	Terry Randolph	2018–present
Judy Kain	Elaine Stevens	2024–present
Kody Kavitha	Hunter	2024–present
Josh Kelly	Cody Bell	2022–present
Michael E. Knight	Martin Grey	2019–present
Kelly Kruger	Serena Baldwin	2026
Wally Kurth	Ned Quartermaine	1991–2007, 2012–present
David Lautman	Grant Smoltz	2022–present
Arlondriah Lenyea	N'neeka	2021–present
William Lipton	Cameron Webber	2018–present
Lisa LoCicero	Olivia Falconeri	2008–present
Lydia Look	Selina Wu	2015, 2017, 2021–present
Frank Lyon	Frank	2019–present
Virginia Ma	Madison	2024–present
William R. Moses	Jeff Webber	2022–present
London & Jett Prinzo-Berendt	Bailey Louise Jones	2021–present
Trish Ramish	Trish	2021–present
Ricco Ross	Sterling Robinson	2023–present
Carlo Rota	Jenz Sidwell	2024–present
George Russo	Carmine Cerullo	2024–present
Marc Anthony Samuel	Felix DuBois	2012–present
Parry Shen	Brad Cooper	2013–present
Kin Shriner	Scott Baldwin	1977–1983, 1987–1993, 1998, 2000–2004, 2007–2008, 2013–present
Stephen A. Smith	Television reporter	2007
Stephen A. Smith	Brick	2016–present
James Patrick Stuart	Valentin Cassadine	2016–present
James Patrick Stuart	Frank Benson	2020
Easton Rocket Sweda	Leo Quartermaine	2021–present
Kayden Brenna Tokarski	Scout Cain	2026
Darin Toonder	Damon Montague	2023–present
Jessica Trainham	Darcy	2024–present
Ellen Travolta	Gloria Cerullo	1994–1996, 2023–present
Vernee Watson	Stella Henry	2017–present
Viron Weaver	Wiley Cooper-Jones	2021–present
Hudson West	Jake Spencer	2016–2019, 2021–present
John J. York	Mac Scorpio	1991–present
John J. York	James Meadows	1997–1998

== Cast changes ==
=== Returning cast ===
Returning cast members
Actor	Character	Date	Ref.
Alley Mills	Heather Webber	November 5, 2026	

== See also ==
- List of previous General Hospital cast members
- List of General Hospital characters
