= List of General Hospital characters introduced in the 2020s =

General Hospital is an American television soap opera that was first broadcast on April 1, 1963. The following is a list of characters that first appear in the show during the 2020s, in order of first appearance. All characters are introduced by the show's executive producer, Frank Valentini. Brando Corbin (Johnny Wactor) was introduced in January 2020 as the distant relative of Sonny Corinthos (Maurice Benard). Cyrus Renault (Jeff Kober) made his first appearance in February 2021 as an antagonist to Benard's Sonny. Portia Robinson (Brook Kerr) debuted in March 2020 as the mother of Trina Robinson and is later employed at General Hospital. In 2021, the characters of Austin Gatlin-Holt (Roger Howarth), Esme Prince (Avery Kristen Pohl), and Marshall Ashford (Robert Gossett) were introduced. The characters of Rory Cabrera (Michael Blake Kruse) and Cody Bell (Josh Kelly) were introduced in March and June 2022, respectively. Other character introductions include Jack Brennan (Charles Mesure/Chris McKenna), Gio Palmieri (Giovanni Mazza), and Kai Taylor (Jens Austin Astrup). Additionally, multiple other characters appear throughout the decade.

== Brando Corbin ==
Brando Corbin, portrayed by Johnny Wactor, made his first appearance on January 30, 2020. The casting was announced on January 25 of the same year. In July 2022, Wactor was let go from the soap, and made his final appearance on September 20.

== Cyrus Renault ==
Cyrus Renault
- General Hospital character
- Portrayed by: Jeff Kober
- Duration: 2020–2025
- First appearance: February 5, 2020
- Last appearance: December 5, 2025
- Created by: Chris Van Etten and Dan O'Connor
- Introduced by: Frank Valentini
In-universe information
- Other names: Cyrus Grey
- Occupation: Businessman; Drug Trafficker; Chairman of the Board at General Hospital
- Parents: Gordon Grey; Florence Grey
- Siblings: Martin Grey; Laura Collins
- Nieces and nephews: Nikolas Cassadine; Lucky Spencer; Lulu Spencer
- Other relatives: Cameron Webber (adoptive); Spencer Cassadine; Jake Spencer (legal); Aiden Spencer; Charlotte Cassadine; Rocco Falconeri

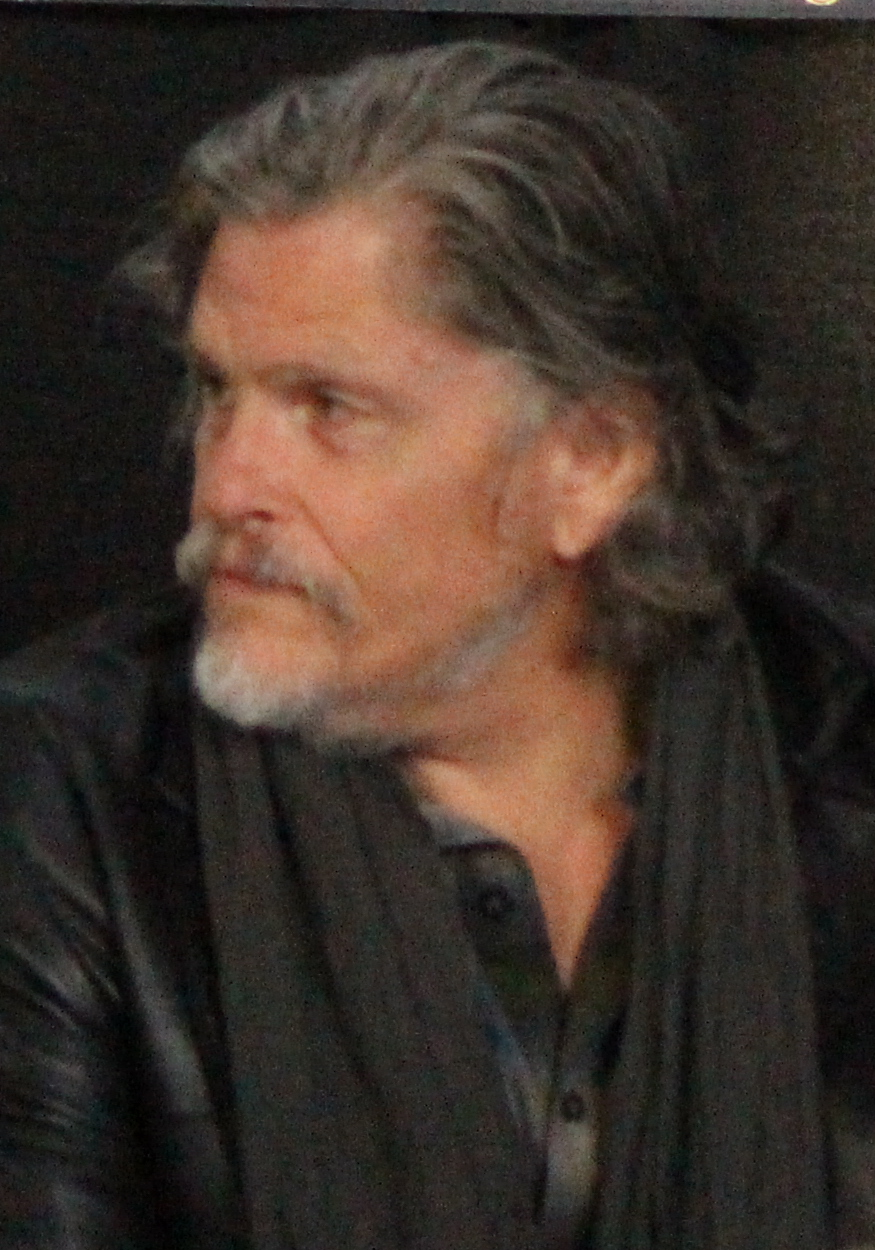
Jeff Kober was cast as Cyrus in 2020

Cyrus Renault, portrayed by Jeff Kober, made his first appearance on February 5, 2020. He departed the role on February 21, 2025; he returned for a guest appearance during the December 5 episode.

In January 2020, Sonny Corinthos receives news a truck containing a shipment of coffee had been stolen, with the truck subsequently found abandoned and burned. While in Brooklyn, New York with his father, Mike and enforcer, Jason Morgan, the three are ambushed in a restaurant by gunmen. Simultaneous to this, two additional ambushes occur in Port Charles – one at Sonny's coffee warehouse, endangering Gladys Corbin and Carly Corinthos, and the other at the pier, threatening Michael Corinthos, Josslyn Jacks, Sasha Gilmore and Laura Collins. Laura is shot in the stomach during the Pier ambush, while the others were saved after Dustin Phillips fought off the gunman. Meanwhile, at the warehouse, Brando Corbin arrived and was able to rescue Gladys and Carly. In Brooklyn, Jason was able to fend off their attacker, while Sonny focused on keeping an agitated Mike calm. Following the skirmish at the warehouse, two of Sonny's men were able to capture one of the attackers, who after being interrogated, attempting escape, and being shot by Jason, reveals the name of his employer – Cyrus Renault.

Renault is revealed to be drug runner, who typically operates out of the Pacific Northwest, but has recently been transferred to Pentonville Penitentiary outside of Port Charles. Sonny opts to pay him a visit, during which Cyrus attempts to entice him into running drugs with him, which Sonny refuses. Parallel to this, it is revealed that Police Commissioner Jordan Ashford once worked as part of a DEA task force alongside Marcus Taggert and two other agents to take down Renault. The two other agents have recently been found dead, with it made to seem as if they died of drug overdoses. Jordan had infiltrated Cyrus's organization and taken a place as his right-hand when her team had manufactured evidence to incriminate Cyrus, resulting in his imprisonment. Cyrus denies any responsibility in the deaths of the other agents.

Jason discovers the location of a warehouse owned by Renault, which he arranges to have blown up.

== Portia Robinson ==
Portia Robinson
- General Hospital character
- Portrayed by: Brook Kerr
- Duration: 2020–present
- First appearance: March 5, 2020
- Created by: Chris Van Etten and Dan O'Connor
- Introduced by: Frank Valentini
In-universe information
- Occupation: Doctor
- Father: Sterling Robinson
- Brothers: Zeke Robinson
- Husband: Marcus Taggert (backstory); Curtis Ashford (2023–present)
- Sons: Desmond Ashford
- Daughters: Trina Robinson
- First cousins: Jared
- Other relatives: Priscilla Johnson

Portia Robinson, portrayed by Brook Kerr, made her first appearance on March 5, 2020. Her casting was announced on February 26, 2020, with Portia being introduced as a doctor, who is also the mother of Trina Robinson (Sydney Mikayla/Tabyana Ali).

Speaking to Soap Opera Digest, Kerr called the role a "blessing," and discussed the audition process, stating it "came out of the blue and when it did, I was like, 'Yes! This is perfect!'" She further discussed her luck of working with several of the soap's cast members, revealing: "A lot of these cast members, I've been a fan of for a long time. The fact that I'm kind of in the middle of it now is so amazing! I'm just really enjoying the ride and I'm so happy to be a part of this team now."

In 2024, Charlie Mason from Soaps She Knows included Portia in his list of the best mothers in American soap operas, explaining that Portia has "raised in Trina an admirable young woman who knows that honesty is always the best policy. Uless sic there's a question mark hanging over your daughter's paternity. Then, erm, let's call it a gray area."

== Austin Gatlin-Holt ==
Austin Gatlin-Holt, portrayed by Roger Howarth, made his first appearance on May 27, 2021. Prior to his debut, Howarth previously portrayed the roles of Todd Manning (2012–2013) and Franco Baldwin (2013–2021). Following the exit of Franco, Howarth spoke out about his status with the soap and his future, stating: "I'm really excited. I have great faith in the people who think of these things. I've been in good hands so far." Speaking on his debut of Austin, he remarked: "I love what I do and I was glad to get back to it — but there's a certain amount of nervous energy that showed up."

In a subsequent June 2021 interview with Soap Opera Digest, Howarth described himself as "in the approach" of Austin. He further explained: "In terms of figuring it out, what's been really kind of fun is that as soon as I think I have it figured out, I'm reminded that I just don't. So there's been some trial and error. I'm learning to juggle and sometimes I drop the ball. But I have a lot of support; [Co-Head Writers] Chris [Van Etten] and Dan [O'Connor] have a lot of great ideas and Frank [Valentini, executive producer] has chimed in with what he needs, and so for me, at the risk of overusing ‘juggling exercises’, I am trying to juggle a lot of different inputs and trying to stay on track and do what's expected. And it's been fun. It requires some concentration from me and different parts of my brain that I wasn't using."

On November 20, 2023, Howarth announced his dismissal. In an interview with Soap Opera Digest, he revealed: "I got a phone call from somebody I've known for a very long time who I love very dearly telling me that when my contract was up at ABC, I would not be offered a new contract and that the character of Austin would be killed, and that this was something that both wanted and needed to do to move story." Austin departed during the final moments of the November 17 episode.

== Esme Prince ==
Esme Prince, played by Avery Kristen Pohl, first appeared on August 16, 2021. She is the daughter of Ryan Chamberlain (Jon Lindstrom) and Heather Webber (Alley Mills), the maternal half sister of Steven Webber (Scott Reeves) and Franco Baldwin (Howarth), the niece of Kevin Collins, the cousin of Livvie Locke (Kelly Monaco), and the granddaughter of Alice Grant and Victor Collins (Nicholas Pryor). In February 2023, Esme welcomed her first child, Ace Cassadine, who was conceived from her one-night stand with Nikolas Cassadine (Marcus Coloma), who was born at Wyndemere Castle with the help of his grandmother, Laura (Francis) and his great-uncle, Kevin.

Pohl departed the role on January 31, 2024. In storyline, Esme and Spencer Cassadine (Nicholas Alexander Chavez) go overboard during a confrontation aboard the yacht he rented into the waters, and are presumed dead. She reprised the role during the December 5, 2025, episode.

== Marshall Ashford ==
Marshall Ashford, portrayed by Robert Gossett, made his first appearance on October 18, 2021. Initially a recurring cast member, Gossett was upgraded to regular status as of April 2022.

In October 2021, a mysterious man arrives in Port Charles, and begins taking an interest in both Curtis Ashford (Donnell Turner) and his nephew, TJ Ashford (Tajh Bellow). Initially suspecting him to be connected to Cyrus, Curtis later confronts him at which point the man introduces himself as Marshall Ashford, Curtis's presumed dead father. Curtis attempts to pursue answers about Marshall's whereabouts over the decades; Marshall is evasive, only indicating he stayed away to keep his family safe.

== Rory Cabrera ==
Rory Cabrera, portrayed by Michael Blake Kruse, made his first appearance on March 29, 2022. His casting was first announced the day prior on March 28. Rory is introduced as the newest recruit hired at the Port Charles Police Department.

== Cody Bell ==
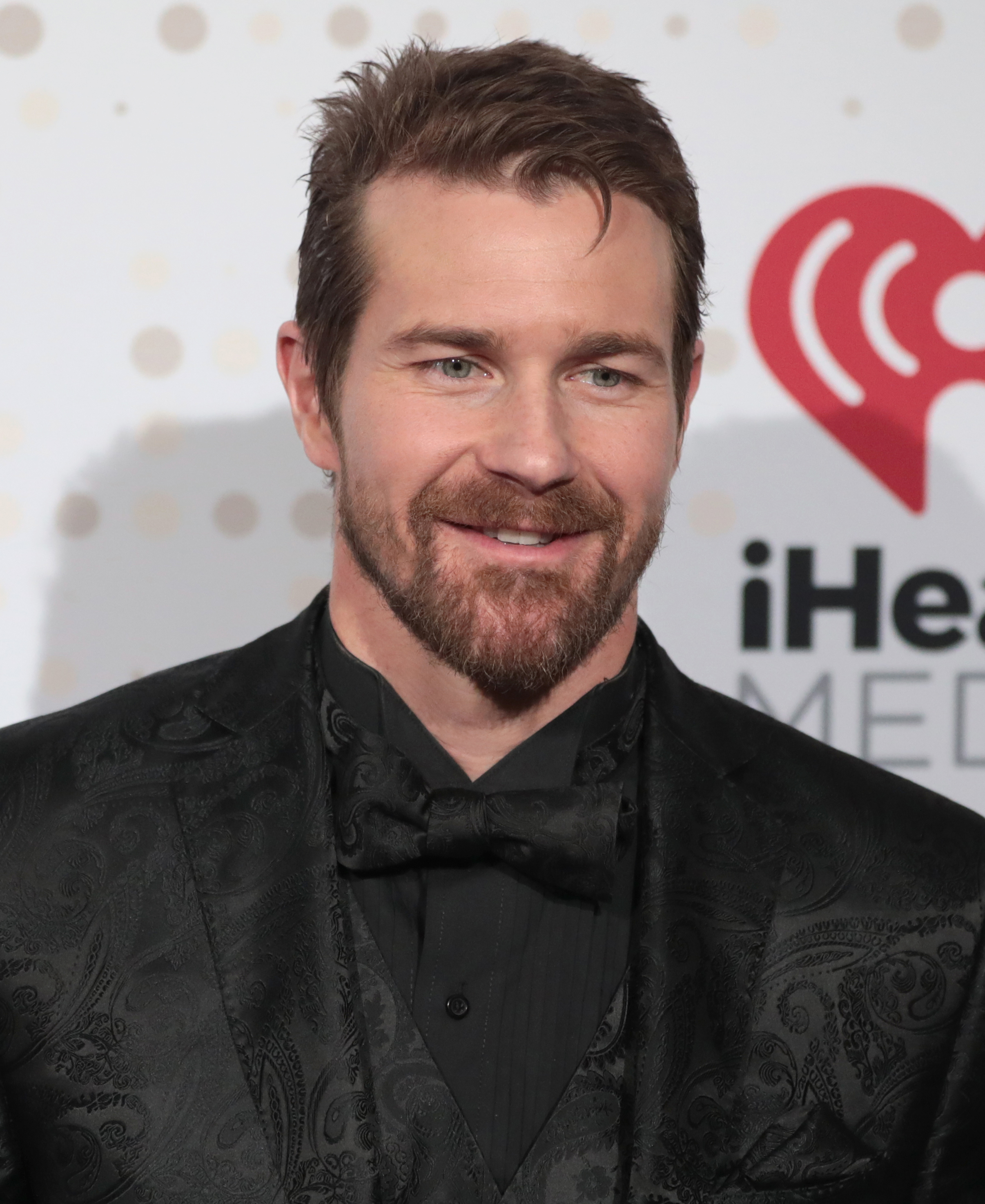
Josh Kelly was cast in the role of Cody in May 2022

Cody Bell, portrayed by Josh Kelly, made his first appearance on June 1, 2022. Deadline Hollywood announced Kelly's casting on May 11 of the same year. He is the son of Mac Scorpio (John J. York) and Dominique Baldwin (Shell Danielson), the maternal half brother of Serena Baldwin (Carly Schroeder), the step-brother of Maxie Jones, the nephew of Robert Scorpio (Tristan Rogers) and the cousin of Robin Scorpio (Kimberly McCullough) and Sasha Gilmore (Sofia Mattsson).

Cody has been billed as a character that would "greatly affect the lives of Sam (Monaco), Dante (Dom Zamprogna) and Britt (Kelly Thiebaud)." In an interview with Soap Opera Digest, Kelly detailed his joining the role, stating: "I was excited and nervous. I haven't done this much dialogue in this short of an amount of time, but that's the challenge and it's one of the reasons I wanted to do this. It's a good work routine, and I think it's good for your mind and your body. I came in for a Covid test on a Thursday, did a wardrobe fitting on a Friday and then on Monday, I was working – out of the frying pan and into the fire!" In August 2025, Kelly announced he had opted to move to recurring status, but maintained he would not be exiting the role.

== Jack Brennan ==
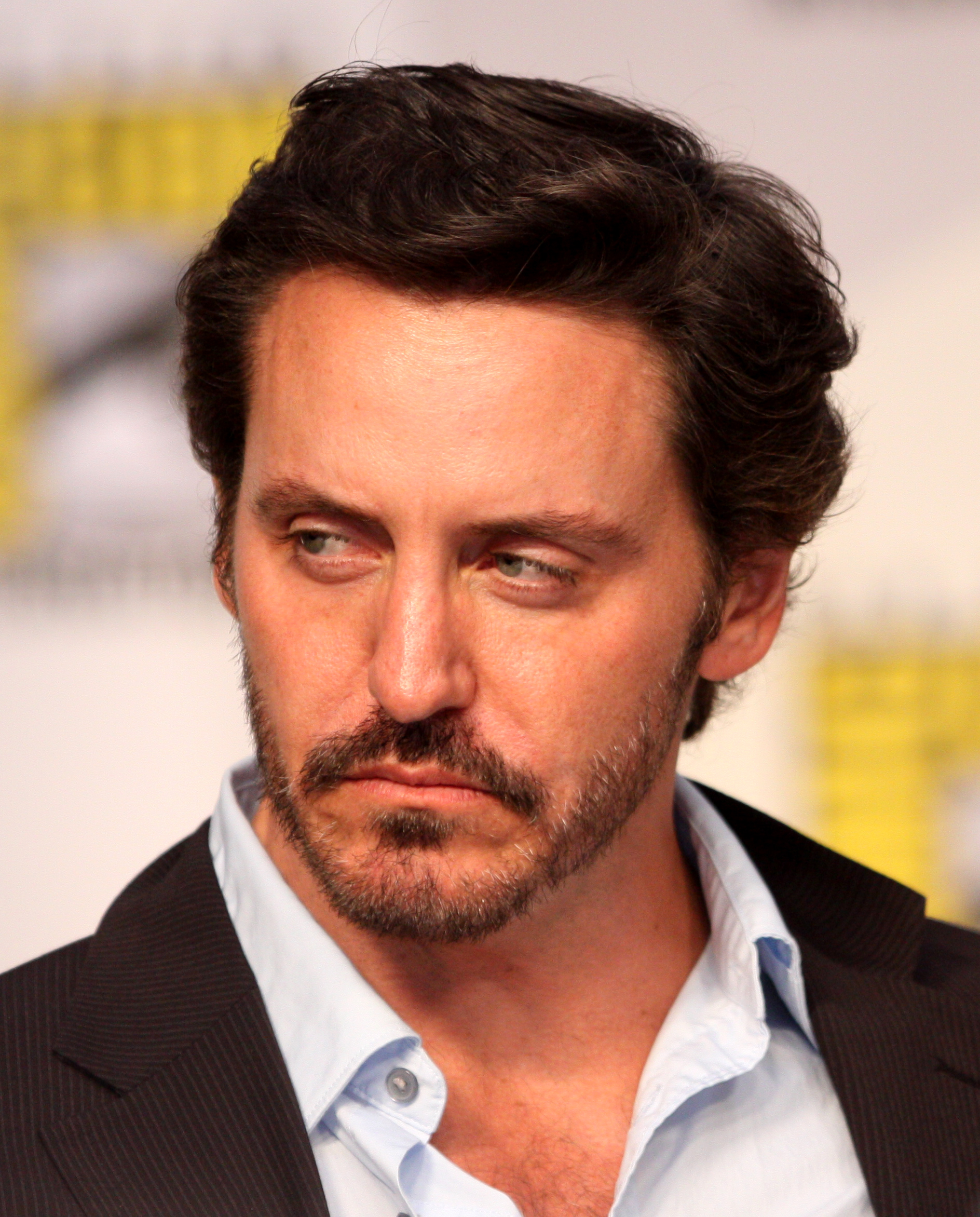
Charles Mesure joined the cast as "Brennan" in 2023 and departed the role in January 2025

Jack Brennan (introduced as John Brennan) is a W.S.B. field agent and head of the Port Charles field office, portrayed by Chris McKenna. Charles Mesure debuted in the role on December 13, 2023, and began appearing as a series regular in August 2024. On February 3, 2025, it was announced Mesure opted to leave the role and was recast with McKenna. Mesure made his final appearance on January 30, 2025, with McKenna debuting on February 4 in recurring capacity. In August 2025, McKenna announced he had been promoted to regular status. In August of the following year, it was announced McKenna would exit the role, with plans for Jack to be killed off in a storyline-dictated departure; scenes concerning Jack's departure aired on September 1, 2026.

== Gio Palmieri ==
Gio Palmieri, portrayed by Giovanni Mazza, made his first appearance on May 15, 2024.

Gio arrives from Bensonhurst, Brooklyn, when he visits Port Charles to play the violin for his cousin Brook Lynn Quartermaine (Amanda Setton) when she marries Harrison Chase (Josh Swickard). He reconnects with Brook Lynn's mother, Lois Cerullo (Rena Sofer) as well as longtime family friend, Sonny Corinthos (Benard), whom Gio calls "Uncle Sonny". Gio bonds with army veteran turned police officer, Dex Heller (Evan Hofer), as Gio's dad was deployed in 2002. Lois later invites Gio to stay at the Quartermaine family's estate, and he starts his new job as an attendant at the Metro Court Hotel's pool. In May 2025, it is revealed Gio is the son of Brook Lynn and Dante Falconeri (Zamprogna).

== Kai Taylor ==
Kai Taylor, portrayed by Jens Austin Astrup, made his first appearance on November 12, 2024. Astrup's casting details and character were announced on October 21 of the same year. Kai was introduced when he met Trina Robinson (Ali) at Port Charles University.

== Marco Rios ==
Marco Rios, portrayed by Adrian Anchondo, made his first appearance on March 13, 2025, in a regular capacity. Anchondo's casting details and character were announced the day prior. A mysterious character involved in the legal career, he revealed: "The character has been very sweet and charming, and, of course, it wouldn't be a soap opera without dark secrets somewhere. [...] He's also very intelligent and very articulate, which is kind of opposite of who I am as a person". He departed the role on March 25 of the following year.

== Ezra Boyle ==
Ezra Boyle, portrayed by Daniel Cosgrove, made his first appearance on March 21, 2025. Cosgrove's casting details and character were announced the day prior. Described as a "consummate politician", Cosgrove revealed: "At first, he seems to be aligning with Drew Quartermaine and there's some shenanigans going on". He revealed his casting came after being considered for the recast of Jack Brennan, which eventually went to McKenna. In February 2026, it was announced Patrick Scott Lewis would pinch-hit in the role, while Cosgrove was unavailable for two episodes. His scenes aired on March 2 and March 16 of the same year.

== Henry Dalton ==
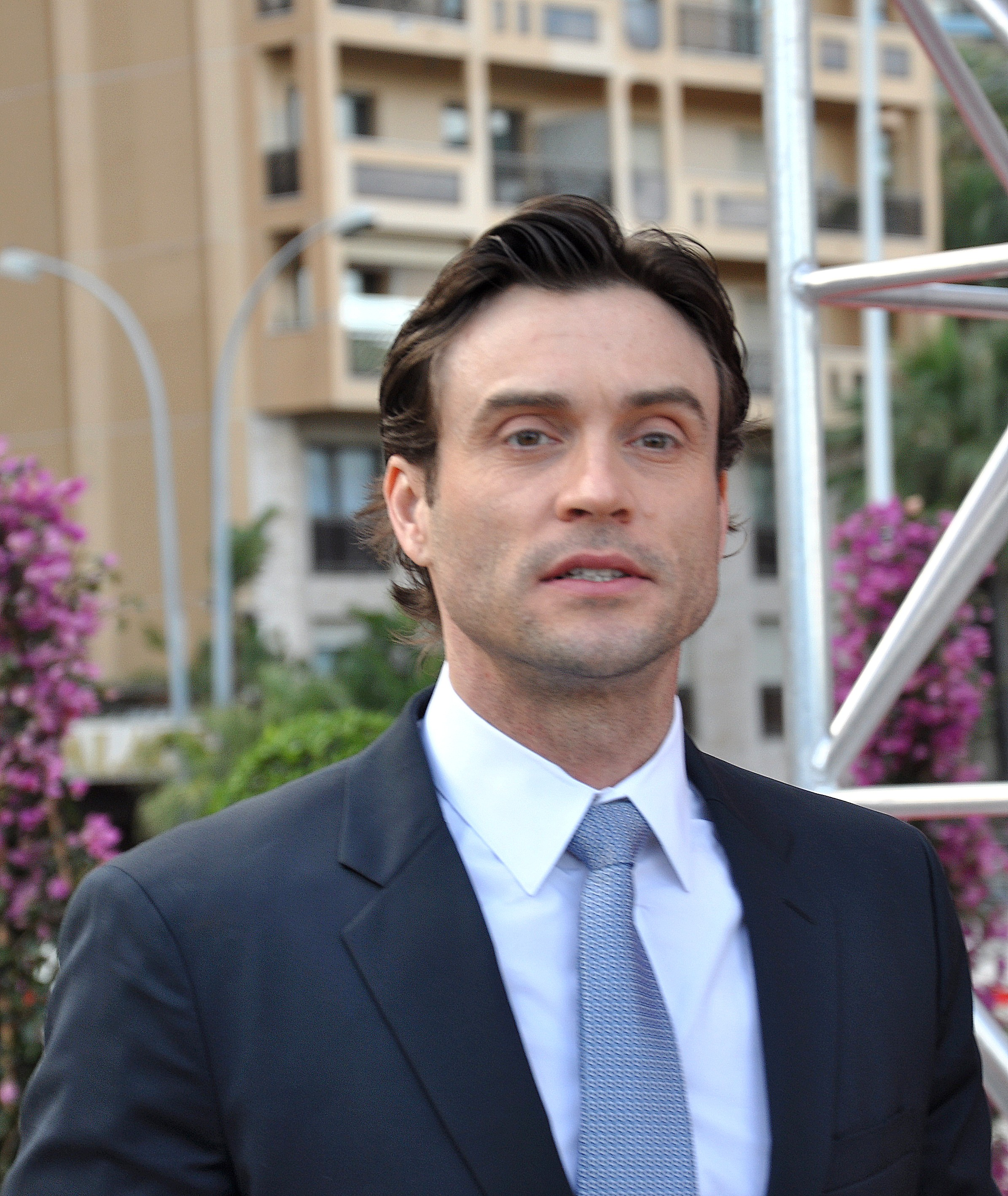
Daniel Goddard made his debut as Henry Dalton in April 2025; he exited the role seven months later.

Henry Dalton, portrayed by Daniel Goddard, made his first appearance on April 15, 2025. Goddard's casting details and character were announced on April 11. Developed as a professor at Port Charles University under the investigation of the W.S.B. and described as "mysterious", Goddard revealed he had auditioned for the role of Jack Brennan (McKenna), and when he was not cast, he was offered the role of "Professor Dalton". Goddard revealed he was asked to audition for the role of Jack Brennan in December 2024; weeks later, he was contacted about the role of Henry, and he believed the "timing was right" in regards to the casting. He exited the role on November 20, 2025, when Dalton was killed off.

== Cassius Faison ==
Cassius Faison
- General Hospital character
- Portrayed by: Ryan Paevey
- Duration: 2025–2026
- First appearance: September 19, 2025
- Last appearance: July 6, 2026
- Created by: Chris Van Etten and Elizabeth Korte
- Introduced by: Frank Valentini
In-universe information
- Other names: Nathan West
- Occupation: Detective (Note: Cassius' occupation as a detective is from his assumption of Nathan West's identity.)
- Parents: Cesar Faison; Liesl Obrecht
- Siblings: Peter August; Britt Westbourne; Nathan West
- Aunts and uncles: Madeline Reeves
- Nieces and nephews: Bailey Jones; James West
- First cousins: Nina Reeves
- Other relatives: Nelle Benson; Willow Tait

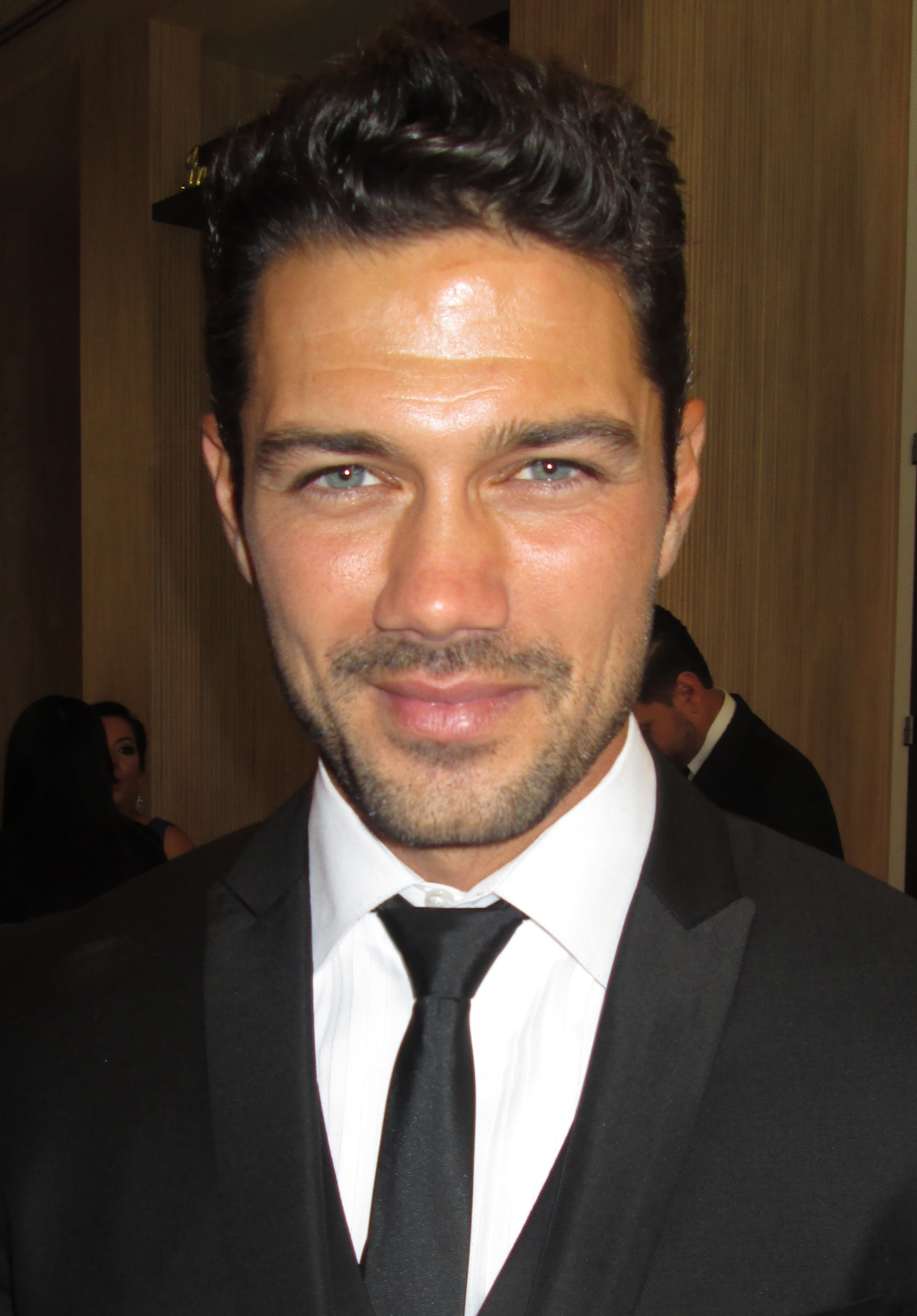
Ryan Paevey's return in 2025 was initially reported as the character Nathan West. However, he was ultimately revealed to be Cassius in March 2026; he departed the role four months later.

Cassius Faison, portrayed by Ryan Paevey, made his first appearance on September 19, 2025. He previously appeared on General Hospital from December 2013 to February 2018 as Nathan West. In August 2025, it was announced Paevey was returning to General Hospital in an undisclosed role. The following month, it was announced he would reprise the role of Nathan beginning with the September 19 episode. In March 2026, it was revealed that Paevey was in fact portraying Nathan's twin, Cassius Faison posing as Nathan.

Following the March 31 reveal, Paevey disclosed he returned with the intent of always portraying Cassius. "This was the role I came back to play," he told Soap Opera Digest. While he described Nathan as a good guy based on his upbringing, he felt Cassius had a case of "little brother syndrome". Scenes concerning Paevey's departure from the role aired on July 6, 2026.

== Joe Fitzpatrick ==
Joe Fitzpatrick, portrayed by Jonathan Bennett, made his first appearance on May 18, 2026. The character and casting was announced on April 16. On Bennett's casting, executive producer Frank Valentini enthused: "We're so excited to have Jonathan joining our cast. He's a tremendous talent and will be a fantastic addition to GH." Ahead of his May 18 debut, Bennett spoke to TV Insider about his casting, describing the role as one he had "really wanted to play". Joe is introduced as a detective with the Port Charles Police Department.

== Tristan Roberts ==
Tristan Roberts, portrayed by Dean Geyer, made his first appearance on July 13, 2026, in a regular capacity. Ahead of the character's introduction, head writers Elizabeth Korte and Chris Van Etten previewed the character as a doctor looking to start over while working at General Hospital. However, this may prove difficult, when Tristan finds that Port Charles and the hospital is "host to more than a few connections to a life he left behind".

Geyer revealed his casting came after he auditioned for a different role, and that one month after his initial audition, he took part in two chemistry reads—the first with Kelly Thiebaud (Britt Westbourne) and the second with Eden McCoy (Josslyn)—the latter of which he claims is the one that lead him to be cast as Tristan. He said he had a lot to live up to in the role, given that Tristan was named in memory of the late Tristan Rogers and the character he played, Robert Scorpio.

== Hudson Parker ==
Hudson Parker, portrayed by Troy Lennon Appel, made his first appearance as a series regular on July 30, 2026. Described as a businessman, his casting was announced on June 12 of the same year after auditioning for the role of Joe Fizpatrick Previewing the role, Korte and Van Etten described Hudson as someone who will not allow anyone to "stop him from getting what he wants". Ahead of his debut, Appel described Hudson as a character who "goes one way, but then leans the other", which he found enjoyable to portray.

== William Baines ==
William Baines, portrayed by Alimi Ballard, made his first appearance on September 3, 2026. His casting was announced the day prior.

== Monet Mitchell ==
Monet Mitchell, portrayed by Blythe Howard, made her first appearance on September 23, 2026. Her casting was announced on September 16. Monet is introduced as a new associate lawyer as Miller & Davis, who is recommended by Alexis Davis (Nancy Lee Grahn) to represent Harrison Chase (Swickard). She is later revealed to be the younger sister of Jordan Ashford (Tanisha Harper).

Speaking on Howard's casting and Monet's arrival, executive producer Valentini teased: "Look for her to have an unexpected connection to a beloved Port Charles resident".

== Jude Jacks ==
Jude Jacks, portrayed by Wil Traval, made his first appearance on October 16, 2026. His casting was announced on September 18. Jude is introduced as a mystery stranger who has a one-night-stand with Britt Westbourne (Thiebaud). He then arrives at the Quartermaine estate, revealing he is the son of Jerry Jacks and claiming to be the father of Brook Lynn Quartermaine's (Setton) adopted daughter, Phoebe.

Detailing his casting, Traval revealed he submitted a self-tape in June 2026, and was brought in for a callback alongside Thiebaud, and was cast soon after. Originally intended as a short-term role, he was promoted to a regular cast member by the conclusion of his first week of filming.

== Other characters ==
List of other 2020s characters
Character	Duration	Actor	Details	Ref.
Warren Kirk	August 6 – November 19, 2020	Christopher Cousins	A doctor who is employed by the WSB and Liesl Obrecht (Kathleen Gati), who is hired to brainwash Dante Falconeri (Dominic Zamprogna) to complete the mission of killing Peter August (Wes Ramsey). He is later killed following a physical altercation with Scott Baldwin (Kin Shriner), which results in Warren accidentally self-inflicting a fatal stab wound.	
Cliff Simpson	March 30–31, 2020	Merrick McCartha	An internal affairs detective who questions Jordan about revisiting a case regarding her three deceased team members.	
Brendan Byrne	September 25, 2020, March 31 – April 19, 2022	Josh Coxx	The brother of Neil Byrne (Joe Flanigan), who lashes out at Alexis Davis (Nancy Lee Grahn) over his brother's untimely death.	
Eddie	January 11–12, 2021	Mikey Jerome	A stranger who rescues a post-traumatic amnesia Sonny Corinthos (Maurice Benard).	
Maggie	April 13 – May 20, 2021	Sydney Walsh	A Pentonville prisoner who is befriended by Alexis Davis (Grahn), who thanks to Alexis, is granted parole.	
Chloe Jennings	May 10 – June 30, 2021	Kimberly J. Brown	A nurse, whose real name is Marie Hopkins, who is hired by Maxie Jones (Kirsten Storms) to assist in the anticipated birth of her daughter, Louise Jones; she is later hired by Peter August (Ramsey) to help keep a secret eye on Maxie, and later kidnaps Maxie with the intent of taking Louise to Peter.	
David Hopkins	July 19–20, 2021	Robert Leeshock	A pilot hired by Peter August (Ramsey) to fly him, Maxie Jones (Storms) and Louise out of Pawtuck to an undisclosed location. He is also the brother of the late Chloe Jennings (Brown). David is later tracked down at Ryan's Bar in New York City by Anna Devane (Finola Hughes) and Valentin Cassadine (James Patrick Stuart), where he admits there was another person on the roof of General Hospital the day of Peter's disappearance.	
Julie	May 16, 2023	Eliza Frakes	The personal assistant of the producer of Home & Heart, which Sasha Gilmore is appearing in. She was played by the real life daughter of Genie Francis (who plays Laura Spencer).	
Madison	April 2, 2024–present	Virginia Ma	Assistant for Nina Reeves (Cynthia Watros) at Crimson	
Elaine Stevens	October 8–29, 2024, February 13, 2025–present	Judy Kain	Private investigator	
Quinn	November 12, 2024–present	Jequan Jackson	Student at Port Charles University; friends with Kai Taylor (Jens Austin Astrup)	
Justine Turner	November 25 – December 6, 2024, February 25, 2025–present	Nazneen Contractor	Assistant District Attorney	
Apollo	May 29, 2026	Maxwell Caulfield	Owner of a New York City art gallery, who meets with Alexis (Grahn) and Ava Jerome (Maura West) when the inquire about information concerning a dead mother, whose baby is currently being foserted by Harrison Chase (Josh Swickard) and Brook Lynn Quartermaine (Amanda Setton).	
Grant	June 1, 2026	Elliott Carr	A nurse who tends to Jack Brennan (Chris McKenna) at Turning Woods.	
Z	July 2–6, 2026	John Oliver	The head of the WSB, who arrives in Port Charles to survey the outcome of the shoot-out on Spoon Island.	
Simon	July 15, 2026	Grady Eldridge	An music industry executive, specializing in artists and repertoire (A&R), who takes an interest in Gio Palmieri (Giovanni Mazza) and Trina Robinson (Tabyana Ali) after being invited to Port Charles by Brook Lynn (Setton).	
