= Tabyana Ali =

American actress and author (born 2002)

- Born: January 28, 2002 (age 24); San Antonio, Texas, US
- Occupations: Actress; Writer
- Years active: 2010–present
- Agent: A3 Artists Agency
- Television: General Hospital

Tabyana Ali (born January 28, 2002) is an American actress and author. She was born and raised in San Antonio, Texas, but later moved to California with her mother to begin a career in the entertainment industry. She appeared in guest roles in various television shows, including New Girl (2015), Shimmer and Shine (2019) and The Big Show Show (2020), in addition to the Black horror film Horror Noire (2021). In 2022, she took over the role of Trina Robinson in the soap opera General Hospital. She became popular with viewers partly as a result of Trina's supercouple romance with Spencer Cassadine (Nicholas Chavez), with the two appearing on the cover of People and the characters being compared to the original General Hospital supercouple Luke and Laura. Ali has released her first book, My Flower Child, in 2020, and her second, My Super B, was published in 2023. In January 2024, San Antonio declared January 13 as "Tabyana Ali Day" in honor of her achievements.

== Early life ==
Tabyana Ali was born on January 28, 2002, in San Antonio, Texas. She attended Hidden Forest Elementary and later Trinity Christian Academy. As a child, she enjoyed singing, dancing and performing. She has revealed she was a creative child and often used her imagination to write short films and scripts. She had a MacBook where she recorded herself dancing and made videos with her dog. Ali's mother, grandmothers and aunts exposed her to soap operas when she was growing up, with Ali joking that they went "insane" when they found out that she had been cast on General Hospital. Her family helped her catch up on the storylines when they found out that she would be joining the soap. Ali and her mother later moved to California to pursue a career in the entertainment industry.

== Career ==
Ali's first acting role came when as an eight-year-old she acted in a commercial. She attended acting classes and had auditions and, in 2013, was associated with her first agent. Ali initially used the name "Tabyana Ford" when she began her career. One of Ali's first onscreen appearances was as a contestant in the game show Win, Lose, or Draw. In 2015, she appeared in an episode of the fourth season of the sitcom New Girl. In 2017, Ali appeared in A Kid Called Mayonnaise. In 2019, she voiced the character of Leelee in the children's animated television series Shimmer and Shine, and she guest-starred in an episode of The Big Show Show the following year.

In August 2020, Ali published her first children's book, My Flower Child. She revealed the book was about the bond and shared experiences of a mother and her daughter, explaining that it was intended for "mothers and daughters everywhere of all ages". A Kindle version was published in August 2022, followed by a revised paperback version the following October. In 2021, Ali appeared in the first episode of Stuck Together. That same year, she portrayed Regina in the Black horror film Horror Noire.

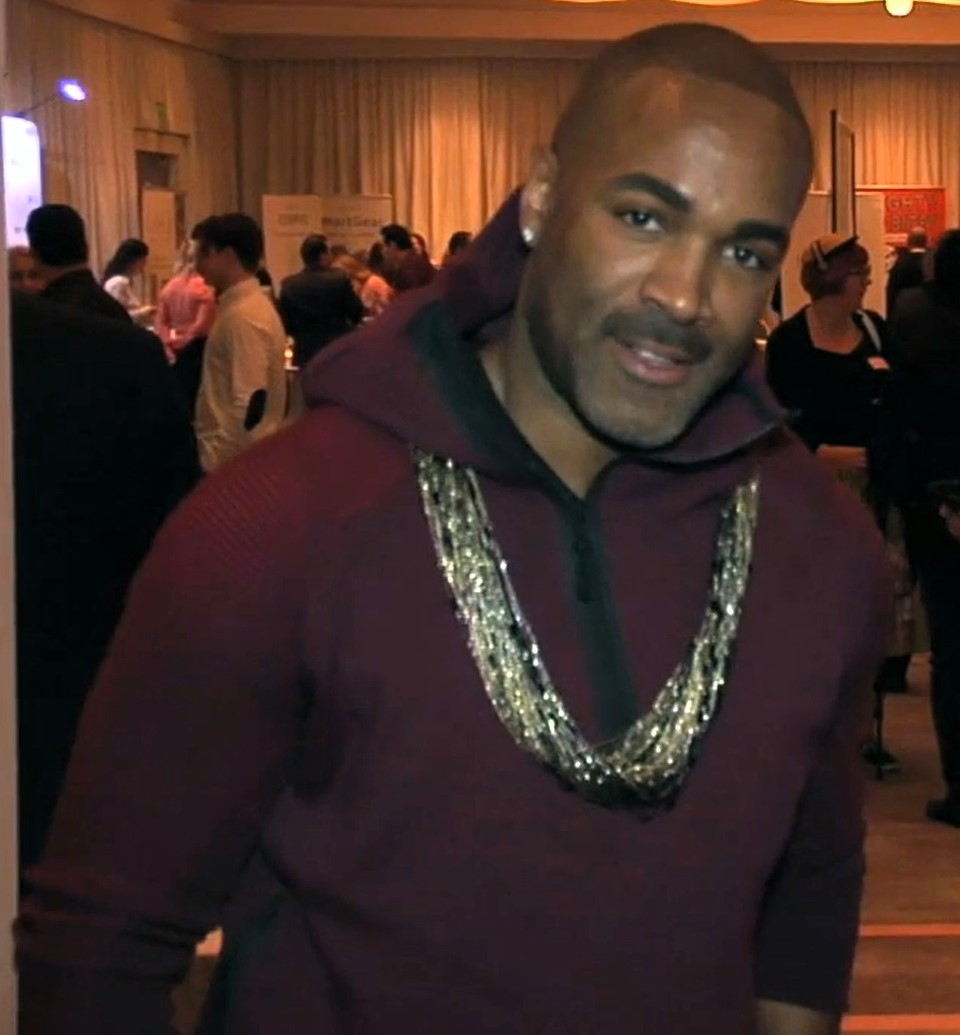
Ali screen-tested with Donnell Turner (pictured), who portrays Ali's character's father in General Hospital.

In March 2022, it was announced that Ali would become the third actress to portray Trina Robinson in the ABC soap opera General Hospital. She took over the role from Sydney Mikayla, who chose to leave the soap in order to focus on her studies. The role had also previously been portrayed by Tiana Le. Frank Valentini, the executive producer of General Hospital, said that he was excited to welcome Ali and "see what she'll do with the role of Trina". Following news of the recast, fans of the soap opera sent Ali messages of support on Twitter and welcomed her to the soap, as did Mikayla, who tweeted "You got this" to Ali. In response, Ali wrote "I'm so grateful to have this opportunity! Thank y'all for the warm welcoming. I'm so happy to be in this position". Ali's agents, A3 Artists Agency, and fans of Trina sent her flowers when she joined the cast.

Ali was called by General Hospital to audition for the role; it was the second time she had been contacted by the soap. When she auditioned, she had been under the impression that she was trying for the role of "Natalie" and did not realize that the audition was for Trina, believing that the role was for Trina's sister or friend. She called the audition process "exciting" and "full circle", as she had previously auditioned and had been shortlisted for Trina when she was 16 but lost to Mikayla. Ali screen tested with Donnell Turner, who portrays Trina's father Curtis Ashford, which she appreciated as he encouraged her "so much". When Ali finally discovered she would be playing Trina, she was "speechless" and explained that she was happy that she and Mikayla had shared the role, as the two had previously met at a party. Her agent later called Ali and told her that she had been given the role. Ali watched previous scenes of Trina on the soap to "get a good feel of the presence" of the character. Ali was nervous on her first day, but the other cast members helped her, with Ali calling them "supportive and encouraging". Ali has revealed that she sometimes receives three or four 60-page scripts that need to be learned by the following week, which was initially more time-consuming but became easier as she became more familiar with her character.

"It's hard to wrap my head around that...Generations of people still think and talk about Luke and Laura. For it to be Nick [Chavez] and I, where people are telling us, 'I'm watching the show because of you.' Or that, 'I left the show but now I've come back [because of you],' I'm like, 'What … what?' It's a lot, it's a lot. But I'm grateful. I'm very thankful."

— Ali on Trina and Spencer's popularity (2023)

Ali made her first appearance as Trina in the episode that originally aired on March 25, 2022. Ali joined the soap at a "critical moment" due to Trina being framed for sharing a sex tape of her two friends. Since Ali has taken over the role, Trina's other storylines have included her relationships with Rory Cabrera (Michael Blake Kruse) and Spencer Cassadine (Nicholas Chavez) and having the people close targeted by a serial killer, as well as the Greenland Ice Princess storyline where Spencer and Trina thwart a deadly plan to wipe out much of the Earth's population via a deadly pathogen. Ali became popular with fans and received fan art of herself, which she created a dedicated email for. Spencer and Trina achieved supercouple status, being compared to original General Hospital supercouple Luke and Laura (Anthony Geary and Genie Francis). Ali has said that she and Chavez have stronger ties due to their connection outside work, explaining that they have a "special" dynamic due to understanding each other on a "very deep level". Ali and Chavez featured on the cover of People as Trina and Spencer, alongside Luke and Laura.

Ali's second children's book, My Super B, was released on July 28, 2023, having been independently published. My Super B was published in paperback and revolves around a young superhero with a "supportive" mother. In 2024, Ali revealed that she is planning to write more books and some scripts and would like to go into comedy, including stand-up. She explained that she would like to be involved in the business world, including having a restaurant and a dog daycare, in addition to organizations to help animals and young women. That same year, she portrayed the supporting lead role of Honor in the comedy-drama film Empire Waist. Ali has also sold a short film, which is also in post-production.

== Personal life ==
Ali has a close friendship with her General Hospital co-star, Eden McCoy. She supports the "Cinderella Program" of The Saving Our Daughters, an organization set up by Keke Palmer which aims to empower girls and women through the arts. Ali also sings, dances and bakes. She loves animals and cooking and enjoys gardening and crafting with her grandmother. In January 2024, Ali's hometown, San Antonio, declared January 13 as "Tabyana Ali Day" (also known as "Love Without Walls Day") in honor of her achievements. Ali has said that she loves food and enjoys going out to restaurants to eat the local cuisine when she visits her family in San Antonio.

== Filmography ==
List of acting roles
Year	Title	Role	Notes	Ref.
2014	Win, Lose, or Draw	Contestant	Game show guest role	
2015	New Girl	Jo	1 episode (season 4)	
2017	A Kid Called Mayonnaise	Malone	Television series	
2019	Shimmer and Shine	Leelee	Voice role (2 episodes)	
2020	The Big Show Show	Becca	1 episode	
2021	Horror Noire	Regina	Black horror film	
2021	Stuck Together	Alana Kirby	1 episode	
2022–present	General Hospital	Trina Robinson	Regular role	
2024	Empire Waist	Honor	Supporting lead role	

== Bibliography ==
- My Flower Child (2020)
- My Super B (2023)
