= Daytime Emmy Award for Outstanding Younger Performer in a Drama Series =

Annual film award

- Awarded for: Outstanding Performance by Younger Actress/Actor in a Drama Series
- Country: United States
- Presented by: NATAS; ATAS
- First award: 2020
- Final award: 2023

Highlights
- Most nominations: Two (2) nominations each: Katelyn MacMullen; Alyvia Alyn Lind; Sydney Mikayla
- Website: theemmys.tv/daytime
- Related: Replaced the gender-specific Younger Actor and Younger Actress categories

The Daytime Emmy Award for Outstanding Younger Performer in a Drama Series was an award presented annually by the National Academy of Television Arts and Sciences (NATAS) and the Academy of Television Arts & Sciences (ATAS). It was awarded annually from the 47th Daytime Emmy Awards in 2020 to the 50th Daytime Emmys in 2023. It was given to honor a young actress or actor who has delivered an outstanding performance in a role while working within the daytime drama industry.

Prior to this category's introduction, the awards were distributed on the basis of gender, in the respective, Outstanding Younger Actor in a Drama Series and Outstanding Younger Actress in a Drama Series categories. An announcement was made to merge in October 2019, and introduce this current single, gender-neutral one. Reasons for such change, included that there are fewer daytime soap operas, thus fewer entrants as well as part as the continuous discussion and implementation of gender-inclusive categories at award competitions. In spite of that, only female-identifying actors earned a nomination in the category in the first year the award was merged.

It was announced that for the 48th Daytime Emmy Awards competition, it would be the final year in which the age 25 is the cut-off. It was then lowered that following year to 21, and lowered further to 18 for 2023. With the age being lowered to 18 for the 50th Daytime Emmy Awards, entrants were required to be "no older than 18 on at least January 1, 2022" in order to be eligible. Additionally, when the announcement was made for the 48th Daytime Emmy Awards, Younger Performer entrants were permitted to enter this category an infinite number of times while they are under 18, but once they turned 18, they were permitted to enter only three times before being moved to either the Lead or Supporting categories. Being age-qualified to enter for Younger Performer award does NOT mean an entrant is required to. Lead and Supporting acting categories are also open to performers under the age of 25. It is up to the discretion of the actor to determine which category they should be considered for.

The award was first presented to Olivia Rose Keegan, for her role as Claire Brady on Days of Our Lives. Eden McCoy was the last winner in this category in 2023. Katelyn MacMullen, Alyvia Alyn Lind, Sydney Mikayla and McCoy have the most nominations in this category, with a total of two.

In February 2024, it was announced that the Younger Performer award was being retired, and younger performers will now have to enter into the regular lead, supporting or guest acting categories.

== Winners and nominees ==
Listed below are the winners of the award for each year, as well as the other nominees.

Table key
‡	Indicates the winner

Year	Performer	Program	Role	Network	Ref.
2020s
2020 (47th)	Olivia Rose Keegan ‡	Days of Our Lives	Claire Brady	NBC	
2020 (47th)	Sasha Calle	The Young and the Restless	Lola Rosales	CBS	
2020 (47th)	Katelyn MacMullen	General Hospital	Willow Tait	ABC	
2020 (47th)	Eden McCoy	General Hospital	Josslyn Jacks	ABC	
2020 (47th)	Thia Megia	Days of Our Lives	Haley Chen	NBC	
2021 (48th)	Victoria Konefal ‡	Days of Our Lives	Ciara Brady	NBC	
2021 (48th)	Tajh Bellow	General Hospital	TJ Ashford	ABC	
2021 (48th)	Alyvia Alyn Lind	The Young and the Restless	Faith Newman	CBS	
2021 (48th)	Katelyn MacMullen	General Hospital	Willow Tait	ABC	
2021 (48th)	Sydney Mikayla	General Hospital	Trina Robinson	ABC	
2022 (49th)	Nicholas Chavez ‡	General Hospital	Spencer Cassadine	ABC	
2022 (49th)	Lindsay Arnold	Days of Our Lives	Allie Horton	NBC	
2022 (49th)	Alyvia Alyn Lind	The Young and the Restless	Faith Newman	CBS	
2022 (49th)	William Lipton	General Hospital	Cameron Webber	ABC	
2022 (49th)	Sydney Mikayla	General Hospital	Trina Robinson	ABC	
2023 (50th) (Note: The 50th Daytime Emmys originally included a fourth nominee in the category, Victoria Grace (Wendy Shin, Days of Our Lives), who was withdrawn by the submitting program on April 28, 2023. Grace (born June 20, 2000) was ineligible to be nominated, as she was older than 18 years of age on January 1, 2022, the date designated for 2023 entrants to qualify for eligibility in the category under the revised age requirements. (She turned 21 about 5 1/2 months before the designated cutoff date for 2023 submittees that met the new age requirements.))
2023 (50th)	Eden McCoy ‡	General Hospital	Josslyn Jacks	ABC	
2023 (50th)	Cary Christopher	Days of Our Lives	Thomas DiMera	NBC/Peacock	
2023 (50th)	Henry Joseph Samiri	The Bold and the Beautiful	Douglas Forrester	CBS	

== Perfomers with multiple nominations ==
2 nominations

- Alyvia Alyn Lind
- Katelyn MacMullen
- Sydney Mikayla
- Eden McCoy

== Series with most awards ==
2 wins

- Days of Our Lives
- General Hospital
