= Trina Robinson =

Fictional character from General Hospital

- General Hospital character
- Tabyana Ali as Trina Robinson
- Portrayed by: Tiana Le (2017–2018); Sydney Mikayla (2019–2022); Tabyana Ali (2022–present)
- Duration: 2017–present
- First appearance: June 23, 2017
- Created by: Jean Passanante and Shelly Altman
- Introduced by: Frank Valentini
- Tiana Le as Trina Robinson

- Sydney Mikayla as Trina Robinson
In-universe information
- Other names: Jane Clark; Trina Campbell Robinson
- Occupation: Student; Assistant at Jerome Art Gallery; Intern at Jerome Art Gallery
- Father: Curtis Ashford; Marcus Taggert (legal)
- Mother: Portia Robinson
- Brothers: Desmond Ashford
- Grandfathers: Sterling Robinson; Marshall Ashford
- Grandmothers: Irene Ashford; Florence Campbell (legal)
- Uncles: Zeke Robinson
- Aunts: Gia Campbell (legal)
- Other relatives: Priscilla Johnson

Trina Robinson is a fictional character from General Hospital, an American soap opera on the ABC network. The role was originated played by Tiana Le from 2017 to 2018. Nearly a year later on February 20, 2019, Sydney Mikayla took over the role. Later that year, Mikayla began appearing as a series regular. She vacated the role in March 2022; Tabyana Ali replaced her later that month.

Introduced by executive producer Frank Valentini in 2017, Trina is created by co-head writers Jean Passanante and Shelly Altman as the party girl best friend of Josslyn Jacks (Eden McCoy). For the most part, Trina is mentioned in passing by her friends. With Mikayla in the role, Trina is integrated into the canvas as one of the four young teen characters within the series, along with Josslyn, Oscar Nero (Garren Stitt), and Cameron Webber (William Lipton). Trina also forges friendship with Ava Jerome (Maura West) when she interns at Ava's art gallery. Hailed as one of the show's young heroines, in 2020, Trina steps into a more central role with the reintroduction of established character Marcus Taggert (Réal Andrews) as her father and the arrival of her mother, Portia Robinson (Brook Kerr). Trina struggles to cope with Taggert's presumed death and blames Portia's ex-boyfriend Curtis Ashford (Donnell Turner). In 2021, the writers developed Trina's first potential romance with the troubled Spencer Cassadine (Nicholas Chavez).

Mikayla received two consecutive nominations for the Daytime Emmy Award for Outstanding Younger Performer in a Drama Series for her portrayal of Trina in 2021 and 2022.

== Development ==
=== Casting and creation ===
Representation

I really had a chance to explore my acting chops and really go into depth with this character, which I’ve been grateful to do. I’m so grateful to be able to create her to [be] who I want to be while still carrying out the directors’ and writers’ visions. Hopefully, I represent Black girls on screen in a positive light.

— Mikayla, Girls United (2021)

Le originated the role on June 23, 2017. She reprised the role on March 2, 2018. However, the return was short lived as Le last appeared on March 5, 2018. The actress only appeared for three episodes.

Mikayla's casting was announced by Soap Opera Digest after her debut. In the summer of 2019, Mikayla was promoted to series regular. In late 2021, Mikayla was taken off contract with the series to accommodate her schedule as she started college. In a statement to Soap Opera Network, the actress said "Right now I’m getting into the swing of things at school and navigating the balancing act. ‘GH’ has been super supportive of all the teens going to school and I’m super happy about that. Team ‘GH’!

The genre was new to Mikayla. "When my agent called me about the audition, I was excited, but I’d never really watched soaps. I had a small role on a soap years before, but it wasn’t a genre I was familiar with." The actress auditioned twice for the role. In an essay for Backstage, Mikayla explained her journey: "As I researched the series, I wasn’t sure if my acting style could fit the cadence of the show. Could I do the dramatic looks or cry on cue? However, as I prepared for the audition and callback, I put all that aside." Instead, Mikayla set out to bring "authenticity" to the role. At the audition, Mikayla chose to make the character more like herself because "I can see how the writers want her to be portrayed as just a realistic girl." After a few weeks, Mikayla received a callback which she "felt really good about" and she even left an impression on Valentini and she booked the role later that day.

Mikayla said "Getting GH was definitely a breath of fresh air" as she had run into some difficulty booking roles because she was tall for her age. In an interview with Star-Kidz.net, Mikayla said "Joining the cast of General Hospital was a bit difficult at first but I love it so much." Mikayla felt recasting the role made it more complicated. "I’m the 2nd person to play this character, so unlike other roles I’ve done, Trina didn’t really get in introduced I just kinda jumped into the character so it felt like jumping in 12 feet of water." Mikayla said playing Trina "made me become a better actress." She continued, "I feel so honored to portray Trina." In 2020, Mikayla said "In the past I have often played the same type of comedic roles, so to be given a character with so much depth is the opportunity of a lifetime." In 2021, she stated "What I love about playing Trina is the versatility that she has on screen." She later said "This role has really allowed me to delve into my dramatic side, and I’ve enjoyed every second of it." Prior to her role as Trina, Mikayla struggled to find dramatic roles as a Black actress. "I felt like most of the time I was playing like a quicky one-liner or I had some sassy line. I was usually the punchline of some sort bringing the comedy, which isn’t necessarily a bad thing, but it definitely did get tiring after a while and I was really ready for a challenge. I think General Hospital came at the right time."

In March 2022, Mikayla announced her departure from the role, citing her decision focus on her academics; Tabyana Ali was subsequently announced as Mikayla's successor. Mikayla last appeared on March 17, 2022; while Ali first appeared on March 25, 2022.

=== Characterization ===
==== Personality ====
Upon her introduction in 2017, Trina was characterized Trina as a "party girl." In 2019, Kim Brandow of the Inquisitr said "[Trina] started out as more of a bad girl." Soap Opera Digest said Trina "tells it like it is." In addition, the magazine said Trina has "ambition," "emotional intelligence and empathy." Daytime Confidential said Trina does "questionable things for the right reasons" and she will "go to that mat" for her friends." Hope Campbell said Trina is "assertive, smart, sassy, insightful, and does not let anyone push her around." Tram Anh Ton Nu described Trina as "rebellious" in 2020. Cliché Magazine's Erin Tatum characterized Trina as "a straight-laced teen." KP Smith described Trina as "spunky, beautiful and smart." Dustin Cushman of Soaps.com felt Trina was "the most open and forthcoming" of her peers. Sherrie E. Smith said Mikayla gave Trina a "fiery personality, […] and a little vulnerability for good measure."

Embracing Blackness

I tried to make Trina as genuine and raw as possible; instead of making her an over-the-top teenager, I made her a vulnerable 16-year-old who is loyal, independent, and fun.

— Mikayla, Backstage (2021)

In 2020, Van Etten categorized Trina as one of the "young heroines" of the show. When asked what drew her to the role, Mikayla said Trina is a "strong, independent African American woman." She continued that "Trina really does her own things, and she has interests of her own. Also, she will go after whatever she wants." Of the character in comparison to herself, Mikayla said "Trina is more bold than I am. She says whatever she wants, kinda does whatever she wants." In addition to Trina's outgoing personality, Mikayla said "She's a great student" and "she has great fashion and make-up." She continued "I think Trina is the better looking more outspoken version of me." Mikayla described Trina as the "popular prop queen." In an interview withSoap Opera Digest, Mikayla explained that she and Trina "both have drive and determination. Even though we're young, we both want to work for our dreams and works for our goals and we want to work our way up." Mikayla also revealed that Trina "is really good at hiding her feelings." If something bothers her, "she wouldn't be catty or petty about it." Instead, Trina finds things to distract herself instead of lashing out.

In a 2021 interview, Mikayla said "Trina and I are both headstrong. We really don’t like being told what to do by anyone. However, Trina is a bit more nosy than I am. I like to keep my head down and stay out of people’s way, but Trina does quite the opposite." No matter the situation, Mikayla said Trina's "determination to find the truth always makes her such a fun and feisty character to play." Mikayla felt Trina was a better person because "She really cares about other people’s problems." Mikayla later said "Trina will press an issue. […] Trina will go right in and confront whoever needs to be confronted. […] – she does not care. She has no fear. I definitely should take a chapter out of her book because she’s got guts." According to Mikayla, Trina has a "willingness to see the good in people" that makes it hard for her to trust others. Mikayla stated Trina "has shown herself to be a loyal and protective friend." Trina is a "tell-it-like-it-is" kind of person.

==== Backstory ====
In December 2019, Mikayla remained tight lipped about Trina's backstory in an interview. The actress later admitted that she tried to craft a backstory for the character. However, she said "every time I did, something would kind of change, like, every time I thought I had a fact, it wasn't really true, so it was really hard trying to guess."

In the summer of 2017, Josslyn notes that Trina is allowed to date while she is not. During her sophomore in high school, Trina starts dating a junior and they consider having sex. Trina worries her mom will find the condoms so she convinces Josslyn to hide them for her. In the summer of 2018, Trina worked as an intern at the Port Charles Museum of Fine Arts. In 2020, Trina is revealed to be Taggert and Portia's daughter. Her parents divorce so early that Trina never experienced their relationship outside of co-parenting as Portia felt Taggert's career took priority over their family. While Taggert is always present in Trina's life, Portia and Taggert agree to keep distance between them for safety reasons. Because of the distance, Trina doesn't know much about her parents' marriage and Portia doesn't talk about it. Mikayla described her character to Cliché Magazine in 2021: "Trina is an 18-year-old straight-A student, with a passion for track and a love for art." She also loves art history and some of her favorite artists include David Driskell and Romare Bearden. Because Portia is a doctor, Trina also grows up exploring her mother's medical journals.

=== Introduction ===
Trina's introduction

GH's Trina was a day player in Joss and Cameron's class for two years before getting an internship at Ava's gallery and blabbing to the other high school kids who was crushing on whom. […] Fast-forward to 2020 and boom! She's Taggert's daughter with Dr. Portia Robinson (although Curtis suspects he's her dad), so make room for Mommy at G.H.

— Carolyn Hinsey, Soap Opera Digest (2020)

Trina is introduced in 2017 when Josslyn enlist her help throwing a party. The party ultimately served as the catalyst to introduce Oscar as Josslyn's love interest. Kim Brandow observed that the writers used Trina "to bring a little drama into Josslyn's life as a teen." Until the recast, "Trina was not in the forefront at all for a while but came back on the scene when Oscar's health took a turn for the worse." Mikayla was relieved with her character's slow integration as she was surprised by the swift production process. She told Soap Opera Digest, "I said my lines and I'll never forget, they said 'Cut! Moving on.' And [she] was looking around" wondering if she had another chance to shoot the scene. "I was not use to that! It was good to start with just a few lines, to start warming up, because jumping into the deep end, never really having worked on a soap before, I don't know if I would've been able to handle that."

As she celebrated her first anniversary on the show, Mikayla said to ABC Soaps In Depth "It’s all still so new and exciting for me. I’m learning a lot from the other teen actors and from the veterans on the show, too." Once Mikayla signed a contract, "Trina became more of a central player in GH's younger set." For Mikayla it was "really, really rewarding. I love knowing the writers like what I'm doing." Mikayla later said "It was quite a shock honestly." When Valentini made her aware that Trina would soon have her own storyline, the actress knew she had "to get more training right away." She continued, "I’ve had so much fun preparing for the role of Trina, taking extra acting classes and creating a community that has really helped me to be the best actress I can be."

ABC Soaps In Depth's Chris Eades said "No matter what she looks like, Trina knows how to have fun!" Additionally, Trina also befriends Cameron, who is a bit nervous to be around her due to her "reputation." However, Trina later admits to exaggerating her reputation. She is also suspicious of Josslyn's step cousin, Dev. In October 2019, the character's integration continued as she lands an internship with Ave Jerome at her art gallery. According to Mikayla, "That was when you started to see Trina get her own life, because you never really saw her away from the [other] teens. It was really big for me." Cushman said the scenes brought out Ava's "caring side." Mikayla said "Some of my favorite scenes have been with Maura West (Ava). She is a soap opera icon! It’s an honor to share the screen with her. […] She’s so nice and makes me feel very comfortable when we do our scenes together" Trina's expanded role required "a lot more commitment" from Mikayla. The actress explained: "There are weeks that are extremely line heavy and require a lot of focus in order to make Trina as authentic as possible."

=== Family drama ===
Mikayla was happy with the development that Taggert is Trina's father. "Finally getting a dad helped answer some questions and I was so glad." She later said, "Réal is amazing and we have great chemistry together. When I first met him, he was so nice to me so for him to play my dad is such an honor. Réal is a living legend so working with him is a dream come true." Taggert's apparent death was the first time Mikayla had to cry onscreen. Trina's world is "rocked" when she is "used as bait to lure Taggert" into a trap. An excited Mikayla said "I've kind of learned in GH history, getting kidnapped is a right of passage." On her approach to playing the scenes, she stated "I definitely took it down the more dark path, for sure." Mikayla revealed that she researched "a lot of kidnappings which I don't know was the best thing for my psyche." Mikayla described the scenes as "emotionally draining" which was further exacerbated by her wardrobe. "I was, like, rolling on the floor wearing a dress and heels because Trina and Cam were going to the winter formal [when they were taken hostage]. It was a lot! But that's okay because it made it realistic." Trina is furious with Curtis for dragging her to safety when gunfire breaks out as Taggert gets shot. Donald Thompson said Taggert is "taken out with the snap of a finger" when he comes to Trina's rescue after she is abducted and it is a "heartbreaking loss for Trina." Mikayla put a great deal of effort into her portrayal of Trina's grief. While she felt she got her tearful "Viola Davis moment" as Trina learned of Taggert's death at the hospital, Mikayla worked with her mother and acting coach, Sonya Shepherd, to play out the different stages of grief. "I think that playing with those levels was the biggest part of trying to do a good job playing the sadness. That was really important in my process, knowing that grief is always there, but grief doesn't always mean tears. I had to make sure to do different things so that the audience wouldn't get bored!"

The fallout makes way for Portia's arrival. Van Etten said "We can't access that [big] impact [on Trina] without seeing her other parent, so it was really important to see her mother and to introduce Portia to the canvas. […] We felt it would be important to provide a bit of context to Trina's background so that going forward, we would understand where her head's at." Mikayla was delighted to work opposite Kerr. "Brook had such a beautiful role on Passions so to see her act and to be on General Hospital playing my mother is so interesting. She is such a great actress, we have incredible chemistry on screen, and she is such a sweet person. I couldn’t ask for a better mom." Michael Maloney observed that unlike most portrayals of fictional mother-daughter relationships, Portia and Trina are not "at odds." Mikayla said "we've really connected" of her dynamic with Kerr. "Her maternal energy is great." While Trina had friends, "it’s great that she has someone whom she can turn to, too." However the relationship is complicated by the revelation that Portia shares a past with Curtis, who Trina blames for her father's death. The actress was quite "shocked by how rude Trina was to Curtis" in the aftermath of Taggert's supposed death. "I had seen her be fiery before, but the temporary hatred she seemingly had for him took me by surprise."

In 2021, "Trina pulverizes the pedestal on which she places Taggert. At the same time, Portia encourages Taggert to do what he must to not give up on his daughter." Mikayla stated that "Trina idolized her father and his lie about having been killed caused a shift in their relationship." Because of her admiration for Taggert, "she feels deeply betrayed and hurt by him." In the aftermath of Taggert's lie, "Trina trust her mom even more." Trina struggles with whether to trust her father, "especially when it seems that the pedestal that she placed him on is starting to break." With Taggert back in her life, Trina tries to figure out "what she wants to be for her dad and what she wants her dad to be for her."

== Storylines ==
In June 2017, Trina (Le) is enlisted by her best friend Josslyn Jacks to throw a party while her mom is out of town. After successfully arranging the party, Trina also invites Josslyn's crush Oscar. However, the party gets out of hand when the guests start drinking and Josslyn's grandmother Bobbie Spencer (Jacklyn Zeman) breaks up the party. While the character does not appear much, she is mentioned often by Joss and Oscar. In March 2018, Trina attends the alternative prom that Oscar and Joss have arranged to support a transgender student at school. However, an earthquake hits and Trina suffers minor injuries.

Throughout 2019, Trina (Mikayla) serves as a supportive friend to Joss and Cam. She accompanies them on a road trip with a terminally ill Oscar and comforts Cam as he struggles to accept his mother Elizabeth Webber's (Rebecca Herbst) relationship with reformed serial killer Franco (Roger Howarth). Trina serves as moral support for Cameron when he goes to court after missing his mandatory community service thanks to the trip. As Oscar's health declines, Trina is determined to make sure everything is normal for Oscar and Joss. Despite her own grief over Oscar's passing, Trina does her best to support Joss and Cam, even participating in Joss's attempt at a séance. When Joss is too sad to attend, Trina accompanies Cam to Elizabeth and Franco's wedding reception. Trina and Cam are happy when Joss tags along at the last minute. In the summer Trina and Joss comfort Cam after he is abducted and Franco trades himself for Cam's freedom. She even talks Cam out of selling his car, as he blames the car for his abduction. Later, Cam realizes Trina likes Joss's "cousin" Dev Corbin (Ashton Arbab) and she ask for his help getting Dev to like her. As she starts school, Trina applies for an internship at Ava Jerome's gallery. While Ava hesitates due to her lack of experience, Trina makes an impression and lands the gig. Trina supports Cam as he struggles to cope with Franco's rejection as he doesn't remember their family. Meanwhile, Trina is concerned when Ava checks herself into a mental hospital as she feels she is being haunted by her late daughter, Kiki (Hayley Erin). During a school dance for Halloween, Trina kisses Dev but he just wants to be friends. While she isn't too broken up about it, Trina suspects that he is into Joss though Dev denies it. Trina then learns Joss and Cam have been drinking and tries to sneak them out of the dance but they are discovered by Cam's aunt Lulu Spencer (Emme Rylan) and their teacher, Dustin Phillips (Mark Lawson). The teens are sentenced to Saturday detention where Dev admits that he is an illegal immigrant and that he is posing as Joss's cousin so he can stay in the country; they are sworn to secrecy. As Trina tries to get to the bottom of a recent break-in at the gallery, she is alarmed when Ava suddenly checks herself out of the hospital, claiming she is perfectly sane. On Christmas Eve, Trina tells Joss that Dev has a crush on her.

In 2020, Trina plans to attend the winter formal with Cam as friends, but tells Joss it's a date in an effort to make her face her feelings for Cam. Just before the dance, Trina is visited by her father Taggert and he gives his blessing for Cam to take Trina to the dance. However, the duo are abducted on their way to the dance by Taggert's enemies. While Taggert, Curtis and Jason Morgan (Steve Burton) rescue them, Taggert dies after surgery. Portia returns from her medical conference to comfort a distraught Trina as she blames Curtis for Taggert's demise. Meanwhile, Trina turns to Cam for comfort and they kiss. Trina is furious when Police Commissioner Jordan Ashford (Briana Nicole Henry) announces that Taggert and his DEA partners manufactured against the recently exonerated Cyrus Renault (Jeff Kober), an alleged drug lord. Cyrus confronts Trina and Portia and Curtis intervenes but Trina isn't interested in his help. As Jordan refuses to retract her story, Trina sets out to clear Taggert's name. She later confides in Joss about her kiss with Cam to avoid any awkwardness and assures Joss it means nothing, much to Cam's chagrin. To distract herself from her anxiety around her grief, homecoming, her feelings about Cam, Trina throws herself into her internship. When Cam admits that he has feelings for both Trina and Joss, they kiss again and decide they are better as friends. Dev suddenly lashes out at Joss and Trina after Joss rejects his romantic advances. Though he apologizes, Cam has to convince Trina not to end their friendship with Dev for good. Days later, Cam and Dev are caught in an explosion that kills Dev and leaves Cam blaming himself, despite Trina and Cam insisting otherwise. When Cyrus claims Taggert faked his death to protect Trina, she tries to access medical records with Joss & Cam's help but they are caught by nurse Epiphany Johnson (Sonya Eddy). When Trina tells Portia about Cyrus's claims, Portia wants to file a complaint and they arrive at the police station as Taggert has been arrested. While she is happy he is alive, Trina is furious that he let her grieve and didn't trust her with the truth.

Despite Ava's advice that keeping Taggert's secret would've been too hard on Trina, she wants nothing to do with her father in the New Year. Meanwhile, Trina and Cam comfort Joss after her stepfather Sonny Corinthos (Maurice Benard) is presumed dead. Later, Cam and Trina agree to keep quiet about Dev stealing Joss's journal to avoid tainting her memories of their friend. As she struggles to accept Taggert's betrayal, Cam and Joss offer their support. She and Joss later comfort Cam when his stepfather Franco is stabbed to death. When Cam suspects Franco faked his death to spare their family the pain of watching him die from a brain tumor, the girls help Cam break into the hospital morgue to identify Franco's remains. Trina finally apologizes for how she treated Curtis and he encourages her to reconcile with Taggert. As he is arraigned on fraud charges, Trina encourages Taggert fight so they can mend their relationship. Trina is excited when she and Joss are both accepted to Port Charles University while Joss is sad to be waitlisted by her first choice. Despite Cam & Joss insisting that he go, Cam decides not to attend Stanford University as he wants to make sure Jason is held responsible for Franco's murder. Trina is relieved when Taggert is released into Jordan's custody and sentenced to house arrest as he awaits trial. Trina is saddened when Jordan reveals that she and Curtis are divorcing and Trina is wary of Curtis and Portia's growing closeness. Trina is later furious at Cam for pulling a gun on Jason and later Jordan and she admits that if he looked like her, his life could have ended in tragedy.

== Reception ==
Performer of the Week

When a double dose of calamity - her kidnapping and her father’s shooting - rocked Trina’s world, Sydney Mikayla’s stirring performance made for shattering viewing. […] Mikayla has earned kudos for her relatable, realistic portrayal of Port Charles’s most grounded teen. But when drama surrounding her dialed up, so, too, did our window into her raw and riveting talent.

— Soap Opera Digest (2020)

Mikayla has received positive reactions from both viewers and critics. Mikayla's recast initially was a bit of a distraction for some as it seemingly changed Trina's race. Chris Eades stated that "some fans were a bit confused when the character began appearing more often as she looked quite a bit different than she did before!" Mikayla and the character of Trina were well received in 2019. Cushman said she "is a terrific young actress and hopefully, we will see more of her." Soaps In Depth also hoped Trina would get more focus. "Since stepping into the role earlier this year, Sydney Mikayla has definitely captured our attention. Trina's not necessarily the troublemaker she was introduced as a few years back, but she's maintained her edge while avoiding becoming a glorified talk-to for the other teens. And it's not like she's adverse to stirring things up! […] The more time we spend with Trina, the more we like – and want to know more about – her!" Daytime Confidential listed Mikayla at #10 on its list of the "Top 10 Female Entertainers of 2019." The website praised Mikayla for her portrayal, her chemistry with her co-stars and said the actress "added a much needed boost GH's teen scene." Campbell said Mikayla had "been stealing scenes all year on General Hospital as Josslyn’s best friend." Soap Opera Digest said "Three cheers for Trina Robinson, a breath of fresh air in GH's teen scene." The magazine hailed Mikayla as "a charismatic actress, who has created a believable, likable, down-to-earth figure in Trina." Digest also noted that "her charm isn't just limited to her peers: Mikayla made a strong impression working opposite Maura West. […] We hope the show has big plans […] for this rising star." Tamilu of Soap Central praised the show's casting of its younger characters, including Mikayla as Trina. Each character "holds my interest because each of them is an interesting character in their own right."

In 2020, Soap Opera Digest's Editorial director Stephanie Sloane said "Sydney Mikayla has been quite a find as GH's Trina." Thompson described Trina as a "fantastic supporting player." In celebration of Mikayla's first anniversary in 2020, Campbell said "It’s hard to just not love young Trina on General Hospital.[…] The actress has taken a character just meant to be the best friend of a legacy character and made her someone to root for every day." Cushman said Mikayla is "my favorite of the younger cast." Soap Opera Digest's Mara Levinsky said the actress "earned her way from sidekick to centerpiece in GH's teen scene." Carly Silver credited Mikayla for making Trina "one of the most compelling teen characters in Port Charles." Silver said "the sky's the limit for Trina!" Silver later stated that Mikayla found "success on the show, with fans, writers, and critics alike." Soaps In Depth said "We immediately felt a connection between Trina and her new boss, Ava." Campbell said "Watching Mikayla with Maura West now that Trina is Ava’s art protégé is another delight and an inspired pairing." Thompson described the revelation that Taggert was Trina's father as a "stunner" and said "it's about time we finally meet members of Trina's family." Soaps In Depth was excited by the prospect of Trina being connected to the canvas and said "more story for Sydney Mikayla – who played as beautifully opposite Donnell Turner's Curtis as she has every other scene partner she's had – is a good thing in our book." Cushman said "it was a nice surprise, one I and likely others didn’t see coming." While intrigued by Trina's tie to Taggert, Tamilu of Soap Central felt his return in the midst of a brewing mob war made him "expendable" as there hadn't been any significant casualties to further plot. "That's how you do it" Hinsey said in praise of the writers slow approach to expanding Trina. She continued that Trina "was eased into the canvas before viewers met" her family. Mikayla received critical acclaim for her performance in the wake of Trina's abduction and her grief over Taggert. Mikayla was awarded with Soap Opera Digest's Performer of the Week. Cushman said Mikayla was "absolutely fantastic." Meanwhile, Markos Papadatos of Digital Journal said "one can feel Mikayla's pain and raw emotions" in the "powerful scenes." He continued, "Whenever she is given great written material to work with, she nails those scenes. Really well done." Soap Opera News also listed Mikayla as its Performer of the Week. The blog hailed her as "a star!" While they were already impressed, "she really shined this week! […] Sydney did a fantastic job of portraying Trina’s fear and need to save her father." Liz Masters felt "cheated [by Taggert's "death"] because Taggert was written out when he had so much potential with Trina and Portia." Cushman insisted that Mikayla deserved Emmy recognition for her work throughout the story. Mikayla was nominated for Outstanding Younger Performer in a Drama Series at the 48th Daytime Emmy Awards for the scenes. Mikayla lost to Days of Our Lives actor Victoria Konefal, who plays Ciara Brady. Cushman said Mikayla "gave yet another Daytime Emmy worthy performance as Trina. The grief and rage this young actress has portrayed through the storyline has been totally believable." Michael Fairman TV praised Mikayla for delivering her scenes opposite a temporary recast in Asante Jones, "not Andrews, whom she had previously developed an on-screen chemistry with as father/daughter." The site later said, Mikayla "showed she can make the most out of heavy emotional material … and she holds her own in scenes with the one and only Maura West, too."

In 2021, Silver stated that Mikayla "has been wowing audiences since 2019." Cushman said "I’ve sung this young actress’ praise several times and still hope to see her up for a Daytime Emmy." Smith said the actress "has won hearts for her tender portrayal." Smith added that if not for Mikayla, "Trina could have easily been a one-note character." Soap Opera Digest praised the dynamic between Mikayla and Kerr as Trina confronted Portia about her affair.

In 2023, Charlie Mason from Soaps She Knows placed Trina and Spencer as a shared entry (at #39 and #38) on his ranked list of General Hospital’s 40+ Greatest Characters of All Time, commenting "Yes, these two lovebirds have to share an entry. How could they not? From the moment Nikolas Cassadine and Courtney Matthews’ son was reintroduced as a brooding young man, we’ve been all about his ultimate pairing with beleaguered heroine Trina."
