= Dew Drop Diaries =

- Genre: Fantasy; Children's animation
- Created by: Rick Suvalle
- Directed by: Soléne Azernour; Arthur Qwak; Alban Rodriguez (S2)
- Voices of: Scarlett Estevez; Sydney Mikayla; ViviAnn Yee
- Country of origin: United States
- Original language: English
- No. of seasons: 2
- No. of episodes: 40 (52 segments)

Production
- Executive producers: Aliki Theofilopoulos; Rick Suvalle (for DreamWorks Animation Television)
- Running time: 13 minutes (S1); 24 minutes (S2)
- Production companies: DreamWorks Animation Television; Araneo

Original release
- Network: Netflix
- Release: July 24 – December 4, 2023

Dew Drop Diaries is an American animated preschool television series produced by DreamWorks Animation Television and animated by TeamTO. The series follows the amazing adventures of the group of fairies who help with certain tasks.

The series was originally created in December 2015 and premiered on Netflix on July 24, 2023. Season 2 premiered on December 4, 2023.

== Premise ==
The series follows a group of pint-sized fairies who have been assigned to help city-dwelling human families with tasks such as organizing toys and the lost teeth under pillows for the Tooth Fairy to come up to your places.

== Cast ==
=== Main characters ===
==== Fairies ====
- Scarlett Estevez as Eden Lily, a fairy who has the power of talking to animals.
- Sydney Mikayla as Phoebe Rose, a fairy who has the power of singing.
- ViviAnn Yee as Athena Sage, a fairy who has the power of super-strength.

==== Humans ====
- Spencer Moss as Harper Ryan
- Jakari Fraser as Marcus Green
- Nick Kishiyama as Dylan Cortez-Chang

=== Supporting characters ===
- Olivia Trujillo as Cassie Cortez-Chang
- Olivia Daniels as Lola Cortez-Chang
- Reggie Watkins as Dr. Damon Green
- Zehra Fazal as Dr. Tracy Ryan
- Bob Bergen as Hamilton "Hammy", a Hamster
- Mary Elizabeth McGlynn as Captain Meow Meow/Angel
- Bill Farmer as Wilford
- Aliki Theofilopoulos as Duchess the Dog
- Dee Bradley Baker as Ruffles, a Myna bird, Qwak, a Chipmunk and Bob, a Bluejay. In Nest Sweet Nest, he can't see very well and he has a adoptive family of American Goldfinches.
- Hip Hop, a frog
- Tara Sands as Camp Counselor
- Bob Bergen as Store Owner
- Brec Bassinger as Willow Jasmine, a fairy who has powers of super speed and transforms into a bubble.
- Gisela Adisa as Tooth Fairy, a fairy who collects teeth and turns them into stars.
- Aryan Simhadri as Reed Basil, a fairy who is Athena's cousin and has powers of smelling.

== Episodes ==
=== Series overview ===
Season	Segments	Episodes	Originally released
1	28	28	July 24, 2023
2	24	12	December 4, 2023

=== Season 1 (2023) ===
No. overall	No. in season	Title	Written by	Original release date
1	1	"The Cleat Without Feet"	Rick Suvalle	July 24, 2023
It's Harper's first day playing goalie on her soccer team, but she can't find her cleat. Can the Dew Drops deliver the missing shoe before kickoff?
2	2	"Real Magic"	Brandon Violette	July 24, 2023
Dylan the Great needs his top hat to perform the grand finale of his magic show - but Athena gets trapped in the secret compartment.
3	3	"The Sleepover Save"	Rick Suvalle	July 24, 2023
Phoebe worries that Marcus won't have the best time at his first sleepover because Marcus' dad forgot to pack his favorite stuffed animal.
4	4	"The Very Hungry Vacuum"	Kaita Mpambara	July 24, 2023
When a hungry dirt monster gobbles up Lola's marble and Athena's jump rope, the fairies must figure out a way to get their special items back.
5	5	"The Banana Bread Burglar"	Nicole Belisle	July 24, 2023
A mysterious thief keeps stealing the banana bread that Harper leaves out for Eden on Treat Day. Time for the fairies to set a trap.
6	6	"Finding Meow Meow"	Susan Kim	July 24, 2023
When Captain Meow Meow gets a splinter in his paw, he hides from Harper and her mom to avoid going to the vet. Can the fairies help find the scaredy cat?
7	7	"Catch That Drone"	Scott Gray	July 24, 2023
Harper's drone has gone haywire. Now the fairies must chase the flying toy through the park before it's lost forever.
8	8	"The Fairy of the Teeth"	Rick Suvalle	July 24, 2023
After Dylan loses his first tooth, the Dew Drops worry that the Tooth Fairy won't be able to find the tooth under his pillow.
9	9	"Tree Troubles"	Niki Lytton	July 24, 2023
When Marcus' classmates choose him to babysit the class plant for the weekend, Phoebe must keep the droopy sapling safe from harm.
10	10	"Missing Pieces"	Laura Kleinbaum	July 24, 2023
Lola runs out of time making a nature sculpture for school, so the fairies go on a nighttime scavenger hunt to see if they can finish it for her.
11	11	"The Ticket Trail"	Vivien Mejia	July 24, 2023
Lola runs out of time making a nature sculpture for school, so the fairies go on a nighttime scavenger hunt to see if they can finish it for her.
12	12	"Flying Solo"	Roxy Simons	July 24, 2023
Marcus needs to learn "Twinkle Twinkle Little Star" on the piano before tomorrow's class. Luckily his Dew Drop, Phoebe, is magically musical.
13	13	"Mailed Away"	Kaita Mpambara	July 24, 2023
When Harper's application to cooking camp blows away in the wind, the fairies work together to make sure it gets mailed on time.
14	14	"The Wandering Wand"	Astride Noel	July 24, 2023
The Dew Drops go on a mission to rescue Lola's favorite toy after it mistakenly ends up in a donation box.
15	15	"Lucky Penny"	Nicole Belisle	July 24, 2023
Marcus can't perform at his piano concert without his lucky penny. Can the Dew Drops return it to him before he goes on stage?
16	16	"Hammy’s Day Out"	Scott Gray	July 24, 2023
After Hammy gets loose in his hamster ball, it's up to Eden and her fairy friends to save him and bring him home.
17	17	"The Yarn Fairy"	Jorjeana Marie	July 24, 2023
As the weather turns chilly, Phoebe devises a plan to keep Lola's favorite trees warm in the winter - but not without the help of the Dew Drops.
18	18	"Bake It 'Til You Make It"	Roxy Simons	July 24, 2023
Harper and Marcus want to make cupcakes for their science fair project, but the fairies have to stay one step ahead of their baking disasters.
19	19	"Things That Go Bump"	Susan Kim	July 24, 2023
The fairies must keep Marcus' favorite microscope safe from a mysterious creature that's causing accidents around the house.
20	20	"Hide Like a Dew Drop"	Barbara Haynes	July 24, 2023
During a game of hide-and-sneak-away, Lola tries to think like a Dew Drop - but she might be a little too good at hiding.
21	21	"Chore Score"	Jonathan Hernandez	July 24, 2023
Harper wants to use her first allowance to buy ice cream for her baby brother Nicholas - but one of her quarters goes missing.
22	22	"Dew Drop Swap"	Becky Wangberg & Sarah Eisenberg	July 24, 2023
Athena, Eden and Phoebe need to borrow each other's abilities to help their kids. Solution? A Dew Drop Swap.
23	23	"Full House"	Niki Lytton	July 24, 2023
Baby Nicholas has a new hobby: hiding things. But when he hides mom's car keys, Harper can't visit her grandma to learn how to bake banana cream pie.
24	24	"Gift Express"	Scott Gray	July 24, 2023
When Harper gets sick, Marcus - and the fairies - spend the day cheering her up using Marcus' gift-delivery invention.
25	25	"The Glitter Guide"	Laura Bowes	July 24, 2023
The fairies work together to give their Glitter Guide a warm welcome, but they can't forget the most important thing about being a Dew Drop: their kids.
26	26	"Piano Panic"	Laura Kleinbaum	July 24, 2023
Marcus needs to practice before his big recital, but his piano string is broken. Can the fairies find him a new piano to play on?
27	27	"Dew Drops' Day Off"	Sarah Eisenberg & Becky Wangberg	July 24, 2023
On the Dew Drops' day off, the fairies can help their kids without having to hide - but the messes seem to multiply even with no one home.
28	28	"Up All Night"	Evan Sinclair	July 24, 2023
The fairies try to keep baby Nicholas occupied so that Harper can get some much-needed rest before her first day at cooking camp.

=== Season 2 (2023) ===
No. overall	No. in season	Title	Directed by	Written by	Original release date
29	1	"Gratitude Day"	Arthur Qwak & Soléne Azernour	Laura Zak	December 4, 2023
29	1	"Extra Set of Wings"	Soléne Azernour & Arthur Qwak	Becky Wangberg & Sarah Eisenberg	December 4, 2023
It's Gratitude Day, but Phoebe's special music box card for Marcus blows away in the wind. Athena's cousin, Reed, wants to help with her Dew Drop duties.
30	2	"Dew Glue"	Arthur Qwak & Soléne Azernour	Isavel Fay	December 4, 2023
30	2	"Dew Believer"	Arthur Qwak & Soléne Azernour	Brandon Violette	December 4, 2023
When Harper's clay dragon shatters, the Dew Drops try to glue it back together. Athena tries to cheer on Dylan at his soccer game without being seen.
31	3	"Tea Time's Up"	Soléne Azernour & Arthur Qwak	Sarah Eisenberg & Becky Wangberg	December 4, 2023
31	3	"Barks, Bath and Beyond"	Soléne Azernour & Arthur Qwak	Carleton Carter	December 4, 2023
Athena loves her tea time tradition with Lola, but this week Lola wants to open a lemonade stand. Harper forgets to take Wilford to the Pet Get-Together.
32	4	"The Secret Ingredient"	Arthur Qwak & Soléne Azernour	Aadip Desai	December 4, 2023
32	4	"Delete That Dew"	Soléne Azernour & Arthur Qwak	Sarah Eisenberg & Becky Wangberg	December 4, 2023
Harper wants to bake her mom a key lime pie for Mother's Day, but she's out of limes. Phoebe needs to delete a video of herself on Marcus' phone.
33	5	"Missing Marcus"	Soléne Azernour & Arthur Qwak	Laura Zak	December 4, 2023
33	5	"The Baby-Glitter's Club"	Alban Rodriguez & Arthur Qwak	Jonathan Hernandez	December 4, 2023
Phoebe really misses helping Marcus while he's away at camp. Eden worries about leaving Baby Nicholas alone with his new babysitter, Cassie.
34	6	"Hammy in the House"	Soléne Azernour & Alban Rodriguez	Barbara Haynes	December 4, 2023
34	6	"To Go Lunch"	Arthur Qwak & Alban Rodriguez	Laura Kleinbaum	December 4, 2023
Frightened Hammy hides from Captain Meow Meow at Eden's house. Marcus forgets his lunchbox on the day of his field trip.
35	7	"The Fly-A-Long"	Soléne Azernour & Alban Rodriguez	Becky Wangberg & Sarah Eisenberg	December 4, 2023
35	7	"Unburied Treasure"	Arthur Qwak & Alban Rodriguez	Carleton Carter	December 4, 2023
Glitter Guide Willow drops in to do a "fly along" and check the Dews' progress. Duchess the dog digs up a time capsule at the park.
36	8	"Tooth on the Loose"	Soléne Azernour & Alban Rodriguez	Craig Carlisle	December 4, 2023
36	8	"That Thing You Dew"	Alban Rodriguez & Arthur Qwak	Vivien Mejia	December 4, 2023
Marcus tries to lose a tooth so he can buy his dad a book about space. The Dew Drops are planning a concert in the park but can't find time to practice.
37	9	"Where's the Party?"	Soléne Azernour & Alban Rodriguez	Maria Escobedo	December 4, 2023
37	9	"The Noisiest Night"	Alban Rodriguez & Arthur Qwak	Susan Kim	December 4, 2023
Marcus asks Phoebe for help when he loses the invitation to Diego's party. Mysterious noises wake up Harper.
38	10	"Escape the Backpack"	Soléne Azernour & Alban Rodriguez	Evan Sinclair	December 4, 2023
38	10	"Play Date"	Alban Rodriguez & Arthur Qwak	Laura Zak	December 4, 2023
The fairies accidentally pack themselves into Lola's camp backpack. Marcus and Harper go on a play date, but they're interested in different activities.
39	11	"Flying High"	Soléne Azernour & Alban Rodriguez	Scott Gray	December 4, 2023
39	11	"Nest Sweet Nest"	Alban Rodriguez & Arthur Qwak	Evan Sinclair	December 4, 2023
The Dews take Marcus' flying machine for a spin and help their kids from above. Phoebe makes glasses for Bob the bird so he can recognize his family.
40	12	"Level Up"	Alban Rodriguez & Soléne Azernour	Rick Suvalle	December 4, 2023
40	12	"Reed and the Beanstalk"	Alban Rodriguez & Arthur Qwak	Sarah Eisenberg & Becky Wangberg	December 4, 2023
The fairies earn a new ability, but floating brings new challenges. The Dews rescue Athena from show-and-tell, while Reed's assigned to his first family.

== Release ==
The series premiered on Netflix on July 24, 2023.
