= Invincible Fight Girl =

American animated television series

- Genre: Action comedy
- Created by: Juston Gordon-Montgomery
- Voices of: Sydney Mikayla; Rolonda Watts; Paul Castro Jr.; TK Weaver
- Narrated by: Keith David
- Composer: Mike Reagan
- Country of origin: United States
- Original language: English
- No. of seasons: 1
- No. of episodes: 10

Production
- Executive producers: Juston Gordon-Montgomery; Sam Register
- Producers: Sophia Monico; Rochelle Perry
- Editor: Paul Douglas
- Running time: 22 minutes
- Production company: Cartoon Network Studios

Original release
- Network: Adult Swim
- Release: November 3 – December 22, 2024

Invincible Fight Girl is an American animated action comedy television series created by Juston Gordon-Montgomery for Cartoon Network's nighttime programming block Adult Swim. The series premiered on November 3, 2024, in the United States on the Toonami programming block and on the streaming service HBO Max shortly after its initial broadcast.

== Premise ==
A young girl named Andy, living in Wrestling World, endeavors to become the best pro-wrestler ever.

== Characters ==
=== Main characters ===
- Andronicus Dependent "Andy" Smith (voiced by Sydney Mikayla) – A young girl dedicated to becoming the best pro-wrestler in the world, even though her parents want her to be an accountant instead
- Aunt P / Quesa Poblana (voiced by Rolonda Watts) – A retired and cynical wrestling champion
- Craig (voiced by Paul Castro Jr.) – Aunt P's nephew, who tries to profit off wrestling, and who Andy meets when she first arrives in Rustburn
- Mikey Beefpuncha (voiced by TK Weaver) – An innocent, yet intelligent and muscular 8-year-old analyst of wrestling, who dreams of becoming a sports journalist

=== Recurring characters ===
- Immaculate / Julius (voiced by Tony Baker) – A pro-wrestler and the leader of the Perm Gang
- Delectable / Sone (voiced by Kaitlyn Robrock) – A pro-wrestler and member of the Perm Gang
- Sumptuous / Kate (voiced by Andia Winslow) – A pro-wrestler and member of the Perm Gang
- Smoove / Jeff (voiced by Ben Giroux) – A pro-wrestler and member of the Perm Gang
- Narrator / Scouter (voiced by Keith David) – A scouter for the Global Wrestling Commission, who narrates the series
- Goldy (voiced by Carla Renata) – The owner of a saloon in Rustburn called Busters, where failed pro-wrestlers hang out
- Pampa (voiced by Fred Tatasciore) – A patron at Busters
- Coca (voiced by Lauren Lapkus) – A patron at Busters
- Mbrandon Beefpuncha (voiced by Luis Bermudez) – Mikey's older brother

=== Guest characters ===
- Trish (voiced by Angel Laketa Moore) – Andy's mother
- Herb (voiced by Calvin Winbush) – Andy's father
- Academy Supervisor (voiced by Cynthia Kaye McWilliams) – Andy's supervisor while at the Junior Accountant Academy
- Dave (voiced by Raphael Alejandro) – A junior accountant, and one of Andy's classmates
- Mega Beefpuncha (voiced by Clancy Brown) – Mikey and Mbrandon's father
- Ruff (voiced by Dana Snyder) – A former wrestler, Tumble's ex-husband, Bertie's father, and leader of the Finger Clan.
- Tumble (voiced by Jodi Carlisle) – A former wrestler, Ruff's ex-wife, Bertie's mother, and leader of the Toe Clan.
- Bertie (voiced by Anjali Kunapaneni) – Ruff and Tumble's daughter.

== Episodes ==
No.	Title	Directed by	Written by	Original release date	US viewers (millions)
1	"I Am"	Alan Wan	Juston Gordon-Montgomery	November 3, 2024	0.19
Andy is a young girl living on Accountant Isle, in a world that is centered around wrestling. Pressured by her parents' expectations, she studies to become an accountant at the Junior Accountant Academy, but secretly dreams of becoming a wrestler. One day, the academy students are unexpectedly pressed into doing the taxes for incoming wrestlers. Andy becomes excited at the prospect of meeting wrestlers for the first time, but is barred on account of her poor grades and performance. Nonetheless, she sneaks inside and meets a group of wrestlers called the Perm Gang. She asks them if anyone can become a wrestler, only for them to laugh at her. The Perm Gang begins wreaking havoc after their receipts are lost. Standing up to them, Andy challenges their leader, Immaculate, to a wrestling match, which she narrowly wins. Andy is then confronted by her parents, who are horrified.
2	"Dreamers and Busters"	Matthew Bordenave	M. A. Larson	November 3, 2024	0.15
Immaculate attempts to continue the match with Andy, but is forcibly stopped by an elderly wrestler. At home, Andy admits to her parents that she wants to become a wrestler; though initially shocked, they encourage Andy to follow her dream. Andy's parents send her off to a gym in the city of Rustburn in order to train, only for her to find it long-abandoned. While in Rustburn, Andy meets a scammer named Craig, who destroys her phone. She also meets a group of failed wrestlers called "Busters", who run a saloon of the same name. When Andy mentions her wrestling idol—Quesa Poblana—to the Busters, they tell her that she lives just outside of the city. The Busters take Andy to Poblana's house, where she discovers that Poblana is the elderly wrestler from before. Andy asks Poblana to become her trainer, only for Poblana to close the door on her.
3	"Friends"	Alan Wan	Ben Joseph	November 10, 2024	0.22
Poblana stops Andy from entering her home, but she believes that stopping her was a "test," which Poblana denies, and then ties her up. As Poblana drives into town to get supplies to fix her roof, Andy meets Craig, who was hiding out in the nearby barn. He claims he is a nephew of Poblana and later asserts his "real passion" is training wrestlers, conning her into dragging items to sell at a market in the Tenderizing District of the city. He points out a nearby wrestler and claims that that is the wrestler he knows. She comes across Mikey, an eight-year-old kid with muscles, annoying Andy, that he scammed her again. Mikey invites Andy to be a tenderizer and she tests her wrestling styles, while Mikey reveals he wants to be sports journalist that covers wrestling instead of being a wrestler. After that, Mikey's father takes him away so he can train, like his brothers. She challenges Mikey's dad to a wrestling match and ends up beginning a fight with Mikey's brother, Mbrandon.
4	"The Way of the World"	Matthew Bordenave	Shaene Siders	November 17, 2024	0.20
Andy battles with Mbrandon and with Mikey's help, she almost wins, but he draws her into a trap. While Mikey's dad is overjoyed, Andy, who is helped by Craig, tells Mikey to not give up on his dream, making him think back to what his mother once said to him. However, it appears that Mikey doesn't leave and decides to stay with his family. Later, Andy tells Craig she needs to find a teacher, but Craig says he was inspired by her, and offers to be her manager, but she walks away. She comes back when he claims he will get Poblana to train him. Following this, Mikey appears to the surprise of Craig and Andy, and he suggests coming with her, which she accepts.
5	"The Perfect Strike"	Alan Wan	Juston Gordon-Montgomery	November 24, 2024	N/A
Mikey, Craig, and Andy make a presentation to Poblana, hoping to win her over, but she is annoyed. When she returns to her house, Andy is excited, but Poblana is unsure, and challenges Andy to make ten perfect strikes, and if not, she won't train her. Poblana shows them what a "perfect strike" looks like. Craig goes to scammer's alley, while Mikey looks up Poblana's techniques online. However, when he cannot download the videos of her techniques Later, Poblana tells Andy that if she is already asking for help, she should go home. However, she decides to persist. She fails. Craig accidentally activates the factory reset. Mikey blames Craig for messing up, and they agree to help Andy together, and scam the scammers. Andy agrees to accept their help, and they watch old videos of Poblana to train, hoping to undercover her technique. She uses this information to attack and she is excited when it turns out that the counter moved. Poblana remains annoyed.
6	"Behind the Wall: The Finger & the Toe"	Matthew Bordenave	M. A. Larson	December 1, 2024	0.15
The trio continue to analyze Poblana's old matches when they come across her using a perfect strike to win a match against a tandem called Ruff & Tumble. When learning the duo vowed to learn the perfect strike to exact revenge, they journey to locate the tandem's wrestling dojos. They arrive in a desolate town and are attacked by two warring groups called The Finger Clan and House of Toe. Upon being rescued by the sole remaining town inhabitant, a girl named Bertie, the trio learns that Ruff & Tumble had a falling out and had destroyed the town with their fighting. Under Mikey's suggestion, they pose as investigative journalists and learn from both sides that the falling out was because of differing ideals on what part of the body was the focal point of the perfect strike and their fighting had caused them to completely forget their rivalry with Poblana. With Bertie's help they try and create a mutual meeting between Ruff and Tumble to iron out their differences, which they vehemently refuse to set aside. Suddenly the dojos are both bombed causing chaos while Bertie seems more than she lets on.
7	"Bertie Unbound"	Alan Wan	Ben Joseph	December 8, 2024	N/A
Fighting resumes between the Finger & Toe as the trio learn that Bertie was the one who orchestrated the war between the two factions, revealing herself to be the daughter of Ruff & Tumble who wants to destroy the two clans and get her parents back. She challenges Andy to a match while offering to teach her the perfect strike if she allows the fighting to continue. Upon Andy's refusal to help her with the plan and seeing Ruff & Tumble's staunch opposition to reconcile, Bertie goes berserk and terrifies her parents and their followers. Andy overcomes the berserker Bertie and defeats her in their match, with the latter being subsequently driven away from the ruined town by her parents and their followers, much to Andy's sadness. Anguished, Andy lashes out at Ruff and Tumble for neglecting their daughter, blames them for their pointless feud, and tearfully calls them out for treating Bertie like a monster, but Ruff and Tumble return to their senseless fighting afterwards instead of making peace, rendering Andy's attempts to rekindle their relationship fruitless. Feeling guilty about what happened to Bertie and realizing wrestling can also bring out the worst in people, Andy momentarily loses hope in the meaning of becoming a wrestler, before Mikey and Craig help her realize that she has a true goal to attain.
8	"The Rusty Rumble"	Matthew Bordenave	Shaene Siders	December 15, 2024	N/A
With Aunt P's deadline hours away, Andy feels she is close to figuring out the Perfect Strike. When the gang finds out there is an exhibition tournament being held in Rustburn, Mikey thinks that if Andy faces a real opponent, she might finally be able to master the Perfect Strike. At the tournament venue, Andy tries to find an opponent, but no one wants to fight her. Craig turns to Mildew to send some of his goons to fight her. Meanwhile, Aunt P is confronted by a scouter from the GWC, attending the tournament on the lookout for new talent. At the end of the tournament, Andy winds up paired with "the Shoe", a very inept fighter who wears a giant shoe costume. The Shoe actually trips and knocks himself out just trying to enter the ring, making Andy win by default. Just as Andy was giving in to despair in missing her chance to master the Perfect Strike, Craig arrives with Mildew's goons, who turn out to be the Perm Gang.
9	"Formation! The Perm Gang Strikes Back"	Alan Wan	Juston Gordon-Montgomery	December 22, 2024	0.16
The Perm Gang challenge Andy in a rage for revenge. But when the fight starts between Andy and Immaculate, Andy finds Immaculate surprisingly easy to defeat. Andy is about to use the perfect strike on Immaculate when Immaculate cowers away. Everyone realizes that Immaculate has lost his nerve, and now he's very afraid to get hit. Anxious for their partner, the other Perm Gang members desperately try to cheer him back into the match, reminding him of the past they've gone through together. Immaculate has flashbacks to when the Perm Gang members were living on the streets. When bullies stole the gang's money, Immaculate vowed that the Perm Gang would be wrestling champions. Thinking Immaculate is finished, Andy asks for the match to be called. But the other gang members jump into the ring and challenge Andy all at once. At this point Immaculate comes out of his stupor and joins his teammates.
10	"The Missing Piece"	Matthew Bordenave	M. A. Larson	December 22, 2024	0.16
The scouter from the GWC allows a match between Andy and all four Perm Gang members at once to go on. Andy refuses to concede, and defends herself against the four members' relentless attacks as best as she can. Mikey advises her to take advantage of their mistakes, but she finds the four fighting in perfect coordination. Andy resorts to using the Perfect Strike on Immaculate, but it only knocks him down. Frustrated about still not finding the missing piece in accomplishing the move, Andy laments about not being able to be Poblana. That provokes Craig to scold Andy for trying to be like his aunt, reminding her that she is herself instead. That scold finally gives Andy the inspiration to come up with her own unique version of the Perfect Strike. She uses it on Immaculate, and it sends all four Perm Gang members into the sky, wrecking the wrestling ring as well. When Aunt P sees the Scouter try to congratulate Andy, she panics and rushes to Andy, getting her out of the building as fast as possible. Later on at her home, Aunt P reluctantly agrees to train Andy, even though she never accomplished her 10 Perfect Strikes. But later that evening, the Scouter shows up at Aunt P's home. He praises Andy and suggests that the GWC might have a place for her. But Aunt P angrily shows the Scouter the door. Outside, Aunt P warns the Scouter that she won't let the GWC do to Andy what "they did to her".

== Production ==
In May 2022, the series was originally announced to be a new original animated series for HBO Max (later Max) and Cartoon Network. It was later stated that Cartoon Network Studios was producing the series, and asserted again in 2024.

In June 2023, an animatic for the series premiered at the Annecy International Animation Film Festival. At San Diego Comic Con TVfest on February 7, 2024, the first episode of the series premiered. At the AfroAnimation Summit, held from April 10 to 12, 2024 in Burbank, California, Gordon-Montgomery had a panel entitled "How I Got My Show Made: The Underdog Story of Invincible Fight Girl".

An early series preview was released on July 25, 2024. The event, hosted at Savannah College of Art and Design, also included a talk with Juston Gordon-Montgomery, the show's art director (David Depasquale), and supervising producer (Bryan Newton). Later, Sam Register was described as an executive producer of the series.

Prior to the series release, Juston Gordon-Montgomery told The Verge that he wanted his love for pro-wrestling's Attitude Era to show in Andy's character and the series overall, noting the influence of wrestling on his life, inspiration of Pokémon, Naruto, and Hajime no Ippo and added that there are many things that haven't been done in animation in the U.S., like in Japan, and saying they could do the same if they "get the shot" to do so. In another interview with Cartoon Brew, he noted the show's anime influences, the show's development process, challenges caused by bigger changes in the studio, and limitations of a 10-episode season.

The series had half-hour animated episodes which premiered on Adult Swim beginning on November 3, 2024, and then released on Max shortly thereafter.

In an interview with Variety in July 2025, Gordon-Montgomery said he wanted to, with the series, tell a story of a character who had a "lightbulb moment" of chasing their dream, adding he hadn't "really seen that in Western animation" before. He also describe the series about excitement, fear of chasing something, and capturing the "exhilaration...you feel... making progress."

== Reception ==
The series was positively received by critics. Rendy Jones of Den of Geek said that the series is a cross-between My Hero Academia and WWE, saying that the narrative keeps the story grounded, with strong world-building, and has characters which resemble "familiar faces and figures from wrestling culture". Jones, who reviewed the show's first four episodes, said it follows a similar plot to many action-adventure anime, noted that for a Black female protagonist such as Andy to have the "same skeleton" as anime characters like Monkey D. Luffy and Ash Ketchum, said that Andy's character is a great addition to powerful Black female animated characters along with Lunella Lafayette in Moon Girl and Devil Dinosaur, described Craig's character as "exhausting to watch", but said this is balanced out by other characters, while praising the series depiction of wrestling fights, animation style, and storyline. Charles Pulliam-Moore of The Verge said the series echoes shōnen series like Dragon Ball Z and One Piece, and argued that the series blend of different influences comes "together as soon as its characters step into the ring".

In a review for CBR, Daniel Kurland wrote that the series will lead to a "wide range of sports-based cartoons" among Western animation, comparing it to the wide range of sports anime, praising the protagonist as empathetic, relatable, and with an "endearing found family", lauded the animation for being "sumptuous" and "meticulous" and argued that the series remains aspirational while subverting class and gender norms, while sharing a "powerful message of independence, acceptance, and strength". Kurland also pointed to the anime influences like Kinnikuman, Tiger Mask, Megalobox, YuYu Hakusho, and Dragon Ball, and compared the series with Adult Swim's own Ballmastrz: 9009.

== Accolades ==
Award	Date of ceremony	Category	Recipient(s)	Result	Ref.
Annie Awards	February 8, 2025	Outstanding Achievement for Storyboarding in an Animated Television / Broadcast Production	Gladyfaith Abcede, Miki Brewster, Kaela Lash and Sheldon Vella (for "The Way of the World")	Nominated	
