= Tiana Le =

American actress

- Occupations: Actress; Singer; Musician
- Years active: 2016–present

Tiana Le is an American actress, best known for her appearances on Insecure and No Good Nick. She starred in the Disney+ original series, Big Shot.

== Early life and education ==
Le is half African-American and half Vietnamese. She and her brother, TaeVeon, were raised by a single mother, An Le. The siblings are second-generation Americans, as An relocated from Vietnam in 1975 as an infant during the Vietnam War. Le described herself as a "natural performer" growing up. Le attended Corona del Mar High School in Newport Beach, California, where she participated in the musical theater program as it combined her acting and musical talents. In 2021, Le started college at the University of Southern California where she planned to study acting and film making.

Le is a member of Zeta Phi Beta sorority.

== Career ==
Le booked her first major television role in 8th grade with her recurring role on Issa Rae's Insecure, on HBO. Le credited Rae with helping her understand that she had to create opportunities for herself. Le next appeared in Amazon Prime Video's Just Add Magic. In 2017, Le originated the role of Trina Robinson on the ABC soap opera, General Hospital. Le appeared in three episodes between 2017 and 2018. In 2019, Le booked a recurring role on the Netflix comedic drama, No Good Nick. In 2021, Le joined the cast of Big Shots as Destiny, in her first series regular role, opposite John Stamos and Yvette Nicole Brown. Le admitted that it was the kind of role she had been working her entire life for. She also hoped her presence onscreen would serve as representation for people of Afro-Asian heritage.

== Filmography ==
Television and film roles
Year	Title	Role	Notes
2016	Insecure	Dayniece	Recurring role Episode: "Insecure as Fuck"; Episode: "Racist as Fuck"; Episode: "Thirsty as Fuck"; Episode: "Shady as Fuck"; Episode: "Real as Fuck"
2016	Just Add Magic	Young Ida Perez	Recurring role Episode: "Just Add Mama P"; Episode: "Just Add Do-Overs"; Episode: "Just Add Pluots, Part 2"; Episode: "Just Add 1965"
2017	The Fosters	Girl #1	Episode: "The Long Haul"
2017	General Hospital	Trina Robinson (#1)	Recurring role
2019	No Good Nick	Xuan	Recurring role Episode: "The Fool's Errand"; Episode: "The Mystery Shopper"; Episode: "The Italian Job"; Episode: The Trojan Horse; Episode: "The Big Mitt"; Episode: "The Charity Mugger"; Episode: "The Jam Auction"; Episode: "The Badger Game"; Episode: "The Money-Box Scheme"; Episode: "The Catfish"; Episode: "The Block Out"
2021-2022	Big Shot	Destiny Winters	Series regular
