= Katelyn MacMullen =

American actress

- Born: Katelyn Irene MacMullen; June 27, 1995 (age 30); Los Angeles, California, U.S.
- Occupation: Actress
- Years active: 2015–present

Katelyn Irene MacMullen (born June 27, 1995) is an American actress, recognized for her role as Willow Tait on General Hospital.

== Early life and career ==
MacMullen was born in Los Angeles, California. At the age of thirteen, she moved to Reno, Nevada with her family and studied at University of Nevada, Reno. She later returned to Los Angeles and in 2015 made her television debut appearing in an episode of comedy series, Sin City Saints. In 2018 she made her film debut in the horror-thriller The Row. Later the same year, MacMullen was cast as Willow Tait on the ABC soap opera General Hospital; she made her first appearance on October 18. At the 47th Daytime Emmy Awards, MacMullen received Daytime Emmy Award for Outstanding Younger Performer in a Drama Series nomination. She received her second nomination at the 48th Daytime Emmy Awards.

== Filmography ==
Acting roles
Year	Title	Role	Notes
2015	Sin City Saints	Josie	Episode: "You Booze, You Lose"
2018	Roofied	Anya	Short film
2018	The Row	Laura Townsend	
2018–present	General Hospital	Willow Tait	Series regular Nominated – Daytime Emmy Award for Outstanding Younger Performer in a Drama Series (2020–2021)
2023	Motion Detected	Julie	
