= Josh Kelly (actor) =

American actor (born 1982)

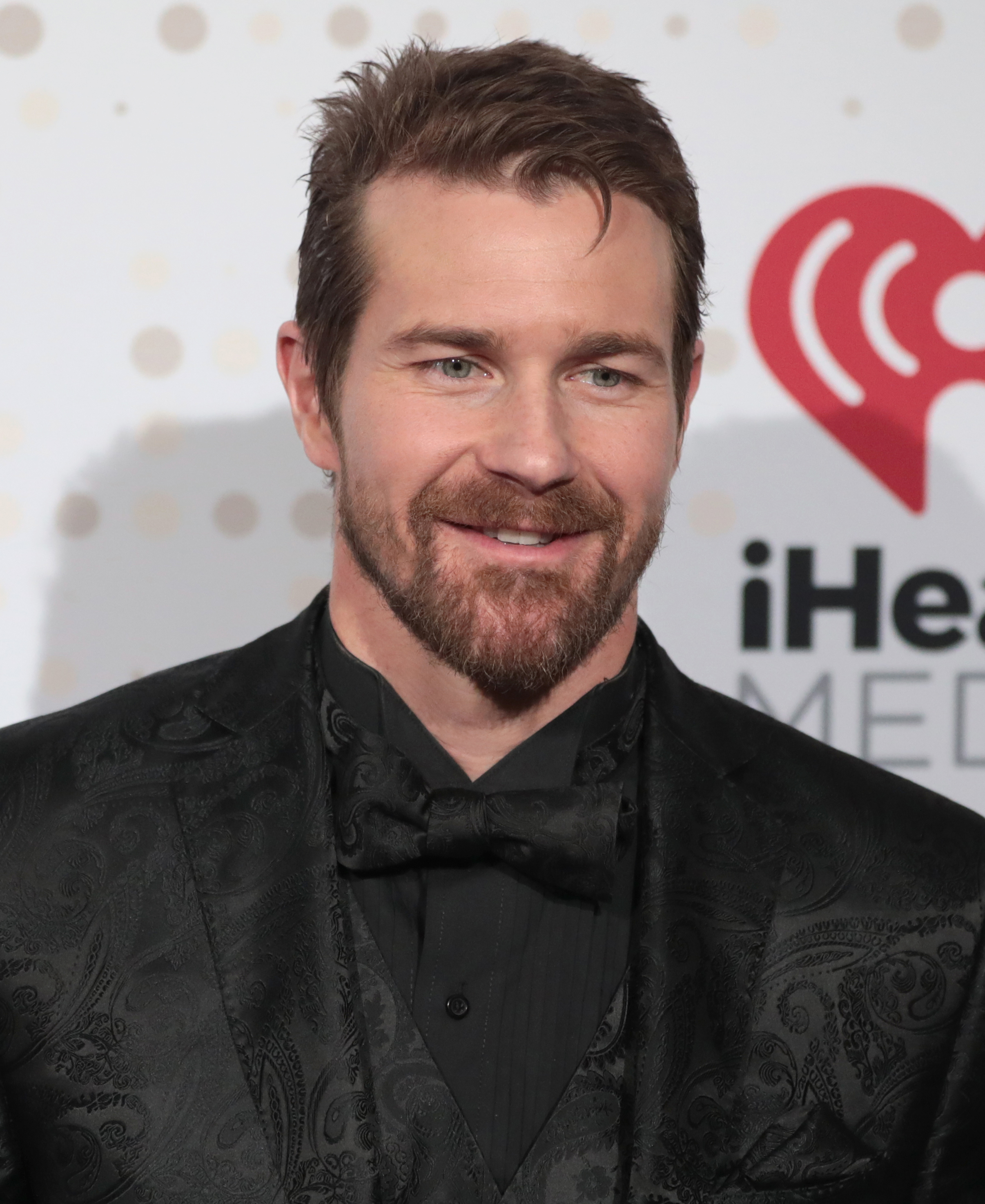
- Kelly in 2023
- Born: April 25, 1982 (age 44)
- Occupation: Actor
- Years active: 2006–present

Josh Kelly (born April 25, 1982) is an American actor, known for his portrayal of Cutter Wentworth on the ABC soap opera One Life to Live. He has also appeared in Transformers: Revenge of the Fallen and Transformers: Dark of the Moon. Kelly also starred as Jeremy Caner in the television series UnREAL, which premiered its first season in June 2015 on Lifetime.

== Early life ==
Kelly was born in Yokosuka, Japan, and raised in Columbia, Maryland, where he graduated from Atholton High School in 2000. He attended high School with Dewanda Wise He knew at a young age that he wanted to be an actor and did not want to attend college.

== Military service ==
Kelly was always interested in acting in action movies. He said he was prompted to join the military because, "I wanted to know if I could do it myself". Due to the influence of his Navy Commander father and the fact that he was a strong swimmer, he initially considered becoming a United States Navy SEAL. Due to his liking of being in the woods, Kelly chose to join the United States Army. He served three tours in Afghanistan and one tour in Iraq as an Army Ranger. Kelly injured his leg during his service. After leaving the Army, he moved to Los Angeles to pursue his acting career.

== Acting career ==
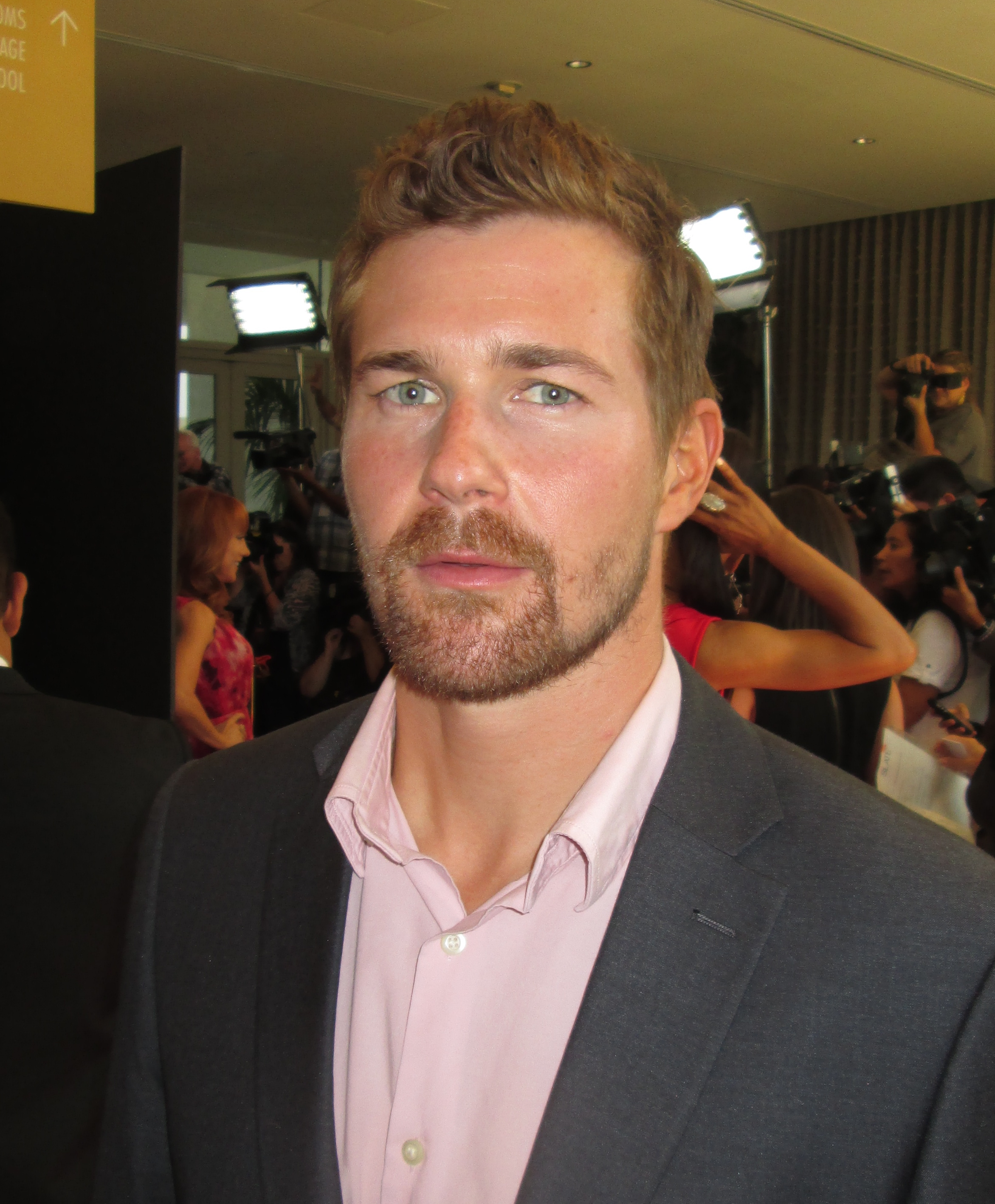
Kelly at the 41st Daytime Emmy Awards in June 2014

Kelly has appeared in minor guest-starring roles in various films and television shows, including Ugly Betty and Las Vegas in 2007, True Blood (2008), NCIS: Los Angeles (2010), Transformers: Revenge of the Fallen (2009), and its sequel, Transformers: Dark of the Moon (2011). He joined the cast of One Life to Live as Cutter Wentworth in December 2010, and remained on the show until December 2011. Following the cancellation of One Life to Live, Kelly was among the actors who signed on to perform in a planned continuation web series that was never realized. In January 2013, it was announced that Kelly had signed on again for Prospect Park's second attempt to reboot the soap opera as a web series. He reprised the role of Cutter for the series on The Online Network from April 29 to August 19, 2013. In September 2013, Josh was cast in the Lifetime drama series UnREAL.

In May 2022, Deadline Hollywood reported that Kelly had joined the cast of General Hospital in the role of Cody Bell.

== Filmography ==
Film
Year	Title	Role	Notes
2006	Friendly Fire	—N/a	Direct-to-video
2007	Supergator	Ryan Houston	Direct-to-video
2007	9 Seconds	Paul	Short film
2009	Transformers: Revenge of the Fallen	Strike Force Team member	
2009	Circle of Eight	Bale	
2009	Cope	Josh	Short film; also director, writer, and producer
2010	The Portal	John	
2011	Transformers: Dark of the Moon	Stone	
2011	Wolf Town	Rob	
2014	Jarhead 2: Field of Fire	Corporal Chris Merrimette	Direct-to-video
2015	Prisoner of War	Prisoner	Short film
2016	Stars	Heather's Father	Short film
2017	Re/collection	Frank	Short film
2017	I Am That Man	Brendan	
2019	Neon Rabbits		Short film
2019	Alone	Patrick	
2020	InstaPsycho	Mr. Davenport	

Television
Year	Title	Role	Notes
2006	Desire	Felix	19 episodes
2007	Ugly Betty	Busboy	Episode: "In or Out"
2007	Las Vegas	Window washer #1	Episode: "The Glass Is Always Cleaner"
2007	Moonlight	Calvin	Episode: "B.C."
2008	CSI: Miami	Paul	Episode: "Raising Caine"
2008	True Blood	Frat boy	Episode: "Strange Love"
2009	Dollhouse	Male	Episode: "Epitaph One"
2010	NCIS: Los Angeles	Navy Petty Officer Mostel Renney	Episode: "Breach"
2010	FlashForward	Graham Campos	Episode: "Revelation Zero (Part 2)"
2010–13	One Life to Live	Cutter Wentworth	Role held: December 29, 2010 – December 29, 2011; April 29 – August 19, 2013
2012	Army Wives	Lt. Cody Anderson	2 episodes
2012	Ben and Kate	Steve	Episode: "Scaredy Kate"
2012	Rizzoli & Isles	Ryan	Episode: "No More Drama in My Life"
2015–18	UnREAL	Jeremy Caner	Series regular (seasons 1–3)
2017	The Night Shift	Xavier Arnold	Episode: "Keep the Faith"
2017	Romance at Reindeer Lodge	Jared	TV movie
2018	My Husband's Secret Wife	Alex	TV movie
2018	Midnight, Texas	Walker Chisum	Recurring role (season 2)
2018	Christmas Bells Are Ringing	Mike	TV movie
2019	What/If	Sam	2 episodes
2019	Doxxed	Vincent	Episode: "A New Hope? Nah."
2019	Bluff City Law	Robbie	Series regular
2020	Station 19	Kyle	Episode: "Poor Wandering One"
2022-present	General Hospital	Cody Bell	Series regular
2025	NCIS: Origins	Detective Archer	Episode: "Monsoon"
