= Sydney Mikayla =

American actress

- Born: Sydney Mikayla Shepherd; February 1, 2003 (age 22); Los Angeles, California, U.S.
- Occupation: Actress
- Years active: 2011–present

Sydney Mikayla Shepherd (born February 1, 2003), known professionally as Sydney Mikayla, is an American actress. In 2014, Mikayla portrayed Olympic gymnast Gabby Douglas in the Lifetime biopic for which she won a Young Artist Award. From 2019 to 2022, Mikayla was a cast member in the ABC daytime soap opera, General Hospital, in the role of Trina Robinson. She also voices the role of Wolf in the Netflix animated series Kipo and the Age of Wonderbeasts.

== Early life and education ==
Sydney Mikayla Shepherd was born on February 1, 2003, the daughter of Sonya Shepherd and Derek Shepherd. Sonya is also an actress who has worked on Broadway, television, and film. While Sonya did not push her daughter into acting, she supported her Mikayla's choice to pursue acting as a career. Sonya enrolled Mikayla in acting classes at age 5 at the Amazing Grace Conservatory. There, she studied under veteran actress Wendy Raquel Robinson. Mikayla also began dancing at Debbie Allen's Dance Academy. Before she booked General Hospital, Mikayla attended a public performing arts high school. In 2019, Mikayla began home-schooling to accommodate her work schedule. Though she is an only child, Mikayla has a dog called Champ. Having been accepted to 14 different colleges and universities, Mikayla ultimately chose to attend college at the University of California, Los Angeles beginning in the fall of 2021.

== Career ==
Mikayla's earliest roles included an episode of her favorite childhood television show, Yo Gabba Gabba! and an episode of the daytime soap opera, Days of Our Lives. In 2011, Mikayla booked her first credited role in the television film, Little in Common, which was intended to serve as a series pilot. She would later go on to appear in episodes of Parenthood, Hawthorne, Community, Hot in Cleveland and Whitney. In 2013, Mikayla was cast as a young Gabby Douglas in the Lifetime biopic, opposite Academy Award winner, Regina King. Mikayla would win the Young Artist Award for her portrayal of Douglas in 2014. Following the success and critical acclaim of The Gabby Douglas Story, Mikayla would go on to appear in episodes of Instant Mom, Teachers, Game Shakers and Fuller House. Mikayla explained that there was a period of time where she had difficulty booking roles due to the fact that she was tall for her age. In late 2018, Mikayla joined the cast of General Hospital in the recurring role of Trina Robinson. She was offered a contract with the series a few months after her debut in February 2019. In October 2021, it was announced that Mikayla had opted to appear in a recurring capacity as she started college, and revealed the show agreed to work around her schedule. On March 4, 2022, Soap Opera Digest announced she would vacate the role on March 17 and the character had been recast. Executive producer Frank Valentini and Mikayla informed the magazine of the actress' decision to focus on school full-time.

Mikayla has also found success as a voice actor with having voiced characters in episodes of the animated series, The Loud House and We Bare Bears. In 2018, just before she booked General Hospital, Mikayla voiced the role of Wolf in the Netflix series Kipo and the Age of Wonderbeasts.

In 2024, she voiced Andy, the protagonist of Invincible Fight Girl.

== Filmography ==
Television and film roles
Year	Title	Role	Notes
2011	Parenthood	Theater Kid #4	Episode: "Opening Night"
2011	Hawthorne	Young Christina	Episode: "Price of Admission"
2011	Community	Children's Choir Member	Episode: "Regional Holiday Music"
2011	Little in Common	Nicole Burleson	Television film
2012	Hot in Cleveland	Little Girl	Episode: "I'm with the Band"
2012	A Beautiful Soul	Daughter	Film
2013	Whitney	Maggie	Episode: "Space Invaders"
2014	The Gabby Douglas Story	Gabby (7–12 years)	Television film
2014	Instant Mom	Girl	Episode: "Popular Mechanics"
2015	Criminal Minds	Maggie Crewsick	Episode: "Pariahville"
2015	Boys in Blue	Zoe	Television film
2016	Teachers	Josie	Episode: "Pilot"
2016	Game Shakers	Shelby	Episode: "Revenge @ Tech Fest"
2016	The Loud House	Joy (voice)	Recurring role; 2 episodes
2016	School of Rock	Olive	Recurring role; 7 episodes
2018	Speechless	Track Team Member	Episode: "D-I-- DIMEO A-C-- ACADEMY"
2018	We Bare Bears	Kit (voice)	Episode: "Baby Bears Can't Jump"
2018	Fuller House	Ashlyn	Episode: "Ghosted"
2019–2022	General Hospital	Trina Robinson	Regular role
2019	Craig of the Creek	Maya (voice)	Recurring role; 13 episodes
2020	Kipo and the Age of Wonderbeasts	Wolf (voice)	Main role
2021	The Barbarian and the Troll	Olivia (voice)	Episode: "Brendar the Barbarian"
2022	Transformers: EarthSpark	Robby Malto (voice)	Main role
2023	Dew Drop Diaries	Phoebe Rose (voice)	Main role
2023	Hailey's On It!	Lucy (voice)	Recurring role
2023	Fright Krewe	Soleil (voice)	Main role
2024	Invincible Fight Girl	Andy Smith (voice)	Main role

== Awards and nominations ==
Year	Ceremony	Award	Work	Result	Ref.
2015	Young Artist Awards	Best Performance in a TV Movie, Miniseries, Special or Pilot – Young Actress 11 and Under	The Gabby Douglas Story	Won	
2016	Young Artist Awards	Best Performance in Live Theater	Pino, A Pinocchio Story	Nominated	
2017	Young Artist Awards	Best Performance in a TV commercial – Young Actor/Actress	Best Buy	Nominated	
2017	Young Artist Awards	Best Performance in a TV series – Guest Starring Teen Actress	Game Shakers	Nominated	
2017	Young Entertainer Awards	Best Guest Starring Young Actress 12 & Under - Television Series	Game Shakers	Nominated	
2021	Daytime Emmy Award	Outstanding Younger Performer in a Drama Series	General Hospital	Nominated	
2022	Daytime Emmy Award	Outstanding Younger Performer in a Drama Series	General Hospital	Nominated	
