= Tajh Bellow =

American actor (born 1995)

- Born: Tajh Romell Bellow; February 9, 1995 (age 31); Texas City, Texas, United States
- Education: Cal State LA
- Occupation: Actor
- Years active: 2007–present

Tajh Romell Bellow (born February 9, 1995) is an American actor. He is best known for his role on General Hospital as TJ Ashford for which he received two Daytime Emmy Award nominations.

== Personal life and education ==
Bellow is the son of Alvin Bellow, Jr. and Latasha Rene Bellow (née Kimble). He has two siblings, Kahree and Maya. Born in Texas City, Texas, Bellow relocated to Katy, Texas, just outside of Houston when he was 7 years old. Bellow relocated to California at age 12 to pursue his acting career. Bellow attended Burbank High School in Burbank, California. As a sophomore, Bellow took the California High School Proficiency Exam to test out of high school as balancing school with work proved nearly impossible. He stayed until his junior to continue playing tennis. At 17, Bellow attended community college for 7 years as he tried to balance school with his acting career. In the fall of 2019, Bellow transferred to California State University as a sociology major. In the summer of 2018, Bellow attended a Shakespearian intensive at Magdalen College, Oxford which he credited with renewing his love for acting. As of 2022, he left California State and has enrolled in the Los Angeles Film School.

In February 2020, Bellow suffered a torn quadriceps. The injury was incorporated into his character's storyline on General Hospital.

== Career ==
Bellow started acting professionally at age 12, in 2007 after he was discovered by a talent scout. He booked his first role in 2008 with the short film, Don't Touch If You Ain't Prayed 2. Bellow would also make his feature film debut that year in the comedy Role Models, which starred Seann William Scott and Paul Rudd. Bellow has appeared in primetime series such as Bosch, Filthy Preppy Teens, The Middle, K.C. Undercover and Girl Meets World. Bellow joined the cast of General Hospital as a recast of TJ Ashford on November 20, 2018. Bellow had auditioned for the role twice before, in 2012 and in 2016, before he finally booked the role in 2018. In October 2019, Bellow booked a guest role in an episode of the children's sitcom Bunk'd. In 2021, Bellow guest-starred in an episode of NCIS. In 2022, Bellow was placed on contract at General Hospital.

== Filmography ==
Year	Title	Role	Notes
2008	Don't Touch If You Ain't Prayed 2	Eric	Short film
2008	The Man Who Came Back	Boy who kills mean guard	Supporting role
2008	Role Models	Ronnie's Friend Zak	Supporting role
2009	Gifted Hands: The Ben Carson Story	Curtis	Television film
2009	Who Shot Mamda?	Calvin	Supporting role
2010	Reggie's Family & Friends	Reggie Alexander, Jr.	Web series
2010	Twentysixmiles	Nerdy Kid	Episode: "The Flying Nun"
2013	The Middle	Evan	Episode: "Valentine's Day IV"
2013	The First Family	Brad	Episode: "The First Tutor"
2013	Save Me	Ben Wilkins	Episode: "The Book of Beth"
2013	Sam & Cat	George	Episode: "#ToddlerClimbing"
2013	Phys Ed	Darryl	Television film
2014	Twisted	Kid	Episode: "Danny Indemnity"
2014	Divide & Conquer	Ted	Television film
2015	Girl Meets World	Andrew	Episode: "Girl Meets the Tell-Tale-Tot"
2015	Filthy Preppy Teens	Braff Bishop	Series regular
2017	Game Shakers	Boyd	Episode: "Air TnP"
2018	K.C. Undercover	Elliot	Episode: "Twin It To Win It"; Episode: "Take Me Out"
2018	Bosch	Devonte	Episode: "Missed Connections"
2018	Beerfest: Thirst for Victory	Xander	Television film
2018	General Hospital	TJ Ashford	Recurring role (November 20, 2018 – February 4, 2022); Series regular (February 11, 2022 – February 14, 2025)
2020	Bunk'd	Alex	Episode: "Lava at First Sight"
2020	Calling for Love	Jake Hanson	Television film
2021	NCIS	Samuel Miles	Episode: "Head of the Snake" (2021)
2021	9-1-1: Lone Star	Andrew	Episode: "A Little Help from My Friends" (2021)

== Awards and nominations ==
List of acting awards and nominations
Year	Award	Category	Title	Result	Ref.
2021	Daytime Emmy Award	Outstanding Younger Performer in a Drama Series	General Hospital	Nominated	
2025	Daytime Emmy Award	Outstanding Supporting Actor in a Drama Series	General Hospital	Nominated	
