= Eden McCoy =

American actress

- Born: Los Angeles, California, U.S.
- Occupation: Actress
- Years active: 2011–present

Eden McCoy is an American actress. She is best known for playing Josslyn Jacks in the soap opera General Hospital.

== Early life ==
McCoy was born in Los Angeles, California. She is a graduate of Marlborough School and briefly attended University of Southern California where she represented the beach volleyball team.

== Career ==
Her first big role came playing Josslyn Jacks in the soap opera General Hospital. For her performance on the show she has been nominated 3 times for an Emmy Award. While being unsuccessful in 2019 and 2020 she finally claimed the award in 2023. She hopes that one day she can play a mob boss on the show.

== Personal life ==
McCoy's mother Natasha died in November 2023 after a long battle with cancer. She is currently dating actor Jonathan Heit who she credits for helping her through the tough period.

== Filmography ==
=== Film ===
Year	Title	Role	Notes
2011	Perfect Man	Tiffany	
2015	Tenured	Paige	
2015	Hit the Hitman	Amy	Short
2016	The Kids from 62-F	Cassie	
2017	The Nerd Posse	Jenny	
2018	Stay Tuned: The Movie	Esmee Schreurs	
2018	Cookies and Crime	D. A. Mia Skye	Short
2019	Lit	Mia	Short
2024	The Mime and the Clown	Willa	Short

=== Television ===
Year	Title	Role	Notes
2011	Scary Tales	Marlene	Episode: Snow White and the Juniper Tree
2014	The Thundermans	Snooty Girl	Episode: Paging Dr. Thundermans
2016	Game Shakers	Crystal	Episode: The Girl Power Awards
2018	Walk the Prank	Courtney Adleman	Episode: Slumber Party
2015–present	General Hospital	Josslyn Jacks	Role held since October 14, 2015; Recurring from October 14, 2015 to August 16, 2018; Contract role since August 17, 2018 – present
2020	General Hospital	Carly Spencer	Flashback scenes
