= NAACP Image Award for Outstanding Actor in a Daytime Drama Series =

Former American television award

This article lists the winners and nominees for the NAACP Image Award for Outstanding Actor in a Daytime Drama Series. The award was given every year since the 1993 ceremony and later retired in 2015. Kristoff St. John holds the record for most wins in this category with 11.

== Winners and nominees ==
Winners are listed first and highlighted in bold.

=== 1990s ===
Year	Actor	Series	Network	Ref
1993
1993	**Kristoff St. John**	**The Young and the Restless**	**CBS**	
1994
1994	**Kristoff St. John**	**The Young and the Restless**	**CBS**	
1995	—N/a			
1996
1996	**Kristoff St. John**	**The Young and the Restless**	**CBS**	
1996	Keith Hamilton Cobb	All My Children	ABC	
1996	Adam Lazarre-White	The Young and the Restless	CBS	
1996	Shemar Moore	The Young and the Restless	CBS	
1996	Darnell Williams	The City	ABC	
1997
1997	**Kristoff St. John**	**The Young and the Restless**	**CBS**	
1997	Keith Hamilton Cobb	All My Children	ABC	
1997	Shemar Moore	The Young and the Restless	CBS	
1997	Joseph C. Phillips	General Hospital	ABC	
1997	Nathan Purdee	One Life to Live	ABC	
1998
1998	**Shemar Moore**	**The Young and the Restless**	**CBS**	
1998	Joseph C. Phillips	General Hospital	ABC	
1998	Nathan Purdee	One Life to Live	ABC	
1998	Kristoff St. John	The Young and the Restless	CBS	
1998	Timothy Stickney	One Life to Live	ABC	
1999
1999	**Shemar Moore**	**The Young and the Restless**	**CBS**	
1999	Joseph C. Phillips	General Hospital	ABC	
1999	Nathan Purdee	One Life to Live	ABC	
1999	Usher Raymond	The Bold and the Beautiful	CBS	
1999	Kristoff St. John	The Young and the Restless	CBS	

=== 2000s ===
Year	Actor	Series	Network	Ref
2000
2000	**Shemar Moore**	**The Young and the Restless**	**CBS**	
2000	Peter Parros	As the World Turns	CBS	
2000	Nathan Purdee	One Life to Live	ABC	
2000	Kristoff St. John	The Young and the Restless	CBS	
2000	Mathew St. Patrick	All My Children	ABC	
2001
2001	**Shemar Moore**	**The Young and the Restless**	**CBS**	
2001	Nathan Purdee	One Life to Live	ABC	
2001	Kristoff St. John	The Young and the Restless	CBS	
2001	Mathew St. Patrick	All My Children	ABC	
2001	Timothy Stickney	One Life to Live	ABC	
2002
2002	**Shemar Moore**	**The Young and the Restless**	**CBS**	
2002	Nathan Purdee	One Life to Live	ABC	
2002	James Reynolds	Days of Our Lives	NBC	
2002	Kristoff St. John	The Young and the Restless	CBS	
2002	Timothy Stickney	One Life to Live	ABC	
2003
2003	**Kristoff St. John**	**The Young and the Restless**	**CBS**	
2003	Peter Parros	As the World Turns	CBS	
2003	Nathan Purdee	One Life to Live	ABC	
2003	Paul Taylor	As the World Turns	CBS	
2003	Darnell Williams	All My Children	ABC	
2004
2004	**Kristoff St. John**	**The Young and the Restless**	**CBS**	
2004	Tyler Christopher	General Hospital	ABC	
2004	Keith Hamilton Cobb	The Young and the Restless	CBS	
2004	James Reynolds	Days of Our Lives	NBC	
2004	Timothy Stickney	One Life to Live	ABC	
2005
2005	**Shemar Moore**	**The Young and the Restless**	**CBS**	
2005	Keith Hamilton Cobb	The Young and the Restless	CBS	
2005	Bryton James	The Young and the Restless	CBS	
2005	Michael B. Jordan	All My Children	ABC	
2005	Kristoff St. John	The Young and the Restless	CBS	
2006
2006	**Shemar Moore**	**The Young and the Restless**	**CBS**	
2006	Bryton James	The Young and the Restless	CBS	
2006	Michael B. Jordan	All My Children	ABC	
2006	Antonio Sabato Jr.	The Bold and the Beautiful	CBS	
2006	Kristoff St. John	The Young and the Restless	CBS	
2007
2007	**Kristoff St. John**	**The Young and the Restless**	**CBS**	
2007	Bryton James	The Young and the Restless	CBS	
2007	Michael B. Jordan	All My Children	ABC	
2007	James Reynolds	Days of Our Lives	NBC	
2007	Antonio Sabato Jr.	The Bold and the Beautiful	CBS	
2008
2008	**Kristoff St. John**	**The Young and the Restless**	**CBS**	
2008	Kamar de los Reyes	One Life to Live	ABC	
2008	Bryton James	The Young and the Restless	CBS	
2008	Mykel Shannon Jenkins	The Bold and the Beautiful	CBS	
2008	Tobias Truvillion	One Life to Live	ABC	
2009
2009	**Bryton James**	**The Young and the Restless**	**CBS**	
2009	Texas Battle	The Bold and the Beautiful	CBS	
2009	Dan Martin	The Bold and the Beautiful	CBS	
2009	Cornelius Smith Jr.	All My Children	ABC	
2009	Montel Williams	Guiding Light	CBS	

=== 2010s ===
Year	Actor	Series	Network	Ref
2010
2010	**Cornelius Smith Jr.**	**All My Children**	**ABC**	
2010	Texas Battle	The Bold and the Beautiful	CBS	
2010	Bryton James	The Young and the Restless	CBS	
2010	Terrell Tilford	One Life to Live	ABC	
2010	Cassius Willis	The Young and the Restless	CBS	
2011
2011	**Darnell Williams**	**All My Children**	**ABC**	
2011	Rodney Saulsberry	The Bold and the Beautiful	CBS	
2011	Cornelius Smith Jr.	All My Children	ABC	
2011	Aaron D. Spears	The Bold and the Beautiful	CBS	
2012
2012	**Emerson Brooks**	**All My Children**	**ABC**	
2012	Texas Battle	The Bold and the Beautiful	CBS	
2012	Bryton James	The Young and the Restless	CBS	
2012	James Reynolds	Days of Our Lives	NBC	
2012	Aaron D. Spears	The Bold and the Beautiful	CBS	
2013
2013	**Kristoff St. John**	**The Young and the Restless**	**CBS**	
2013	James Reynolds	Days of Our Lives	NBC	
2013	Rodney Saulsberry	The Bold and the Beautiful	CBS	
2013	Aaron D. Spears	The Bold and the Beautiful	CBS	
2013	Erik Valdez	General Hospital	ABC	
2014
2014	**Kristoff St. John**	**The Young and the Restless**	**CBS**	
2014	Tequan Richmond	General Hospital	ABC	
2014	Lawrence Saint-Victor	The Bold and the Beautiful	CBS	
2014	Aaron D. Spears	The Bold and the Beautiful	CBS	
2014	Redaric Williams	The Young and the Restless	CBS	

== Multiple wins and nominations ==
=== Wins ===
11 wins

- Kristoff St. John

7 wins

- Shemar Moore

=== Nominations ===
18 nominations

- Kristoff St. John

9 nominations

- Shemar Moore

7 nominations

- Bryton James
- Nathan Purdee

5 nominations

- James Reynolds

4 nominations

- Keith Hamilton Cobb
- Aaron D. Spears
- Timothy Stickney

3 nominations

- Texas Battle
- Michael B. Jordan
- Joseph C. Phillips
- Cornelius Smith Jr.
- Darnell Williams

2 nominations

- Peter Parros
- Antonio Sabato Jr.
- Rodney Saulsberry
- Mathew St. Patrick
