= 21st Daytime Emmy Awards =

- Date: May 25, 1994
- Presented by: National Academy of Television Arts and Sciences
- Hosted by: Susan Lucci

Highlights
- Outstanding Drama Series: All My Children
- Outstanding Game Show: Jeopardy!

Television/radio coverage
- Network: ABC

The 21st Daytime Emmy Awards were held on May 25, 1994.

== Winners and nominees ==
Winners are in bold.

=== Outstanding Drama Series ===
- **All My Children**
- As the World Turns
- Guiding Light
- The Young and the Restless

=== Outstanding Lead Actor ===
- Peter Bergman (Jack Abbott, The Young and the Restless)
- Charles Keating (Carl Hutchins, Another World)
- Peter Simon (Ed Bauer, Guiding Light)
- Robert S. Woods (Bo Buchanan, One Life to Live)
- **Michael Zaslow (Roger Thorpe, Guiding Light)**

=== Outstanding Lead Actress ===
- Julia Barr (Brooke English, All My Children)
- Linda Dano (Felicia Gallant, Another World)
- Fiona Hutchison (Jenna Bradshaw, Guiding Light)
- **Hillary B. Smith (Nora Hanen, One Life to Live)**
- Kathleen Widdoes (Emma Snyder, As the World Turns)

=== Outstanding Supporting Actor ===
- Ian Buchanan (James Warwick, The Bold and the Beautiful)
- Thom Christopher (Dante Partou, Loving)
- **Justin Deas (Buzz Cooper, Guiding Light)**
- Patrick Tovatt (Cal Stricklyn, As the World Turns)
- Jerry verDorn (Ross Marler, Guiding Light)

=== Outstanding Supporting Actress ===
- Signy Coleman (Hope Wilson, The Young and the Restless)
- Hilary Edson (Eve Guthrie, Guiding Light)
- Maureen Garrett (Holly Reade, Guiding Light)
- **Susan Haskell (Marty Saybrooke, One Life to Live)**
- Sharon Wyatt (Tiffany Hill, General Hospital)

=== Outstanding Performer in a Children's Special ===
- **Justin Whalin**, CBS Schoolbreak Special: Other Mothers

=== Outstanding Younger Actor ===
- Bryan Buffington (Bill Lewis, Guiding Light)
- Scott DeFreitas (Andrew Dixon, As the World Turns)
- **Roger Howarth (Todd Manning, One Life to Live)**
- Monti Sharp (David Grant, Guiding Light)
- Dondre Whitfield (Terrence Frye, All My Children)

=== Outstanding Younger Actress ===
- Martha Byrne (Lily Walsh Grimaldi, As the World Turns)
- Sarah Michelle Gellar (Kendall Hart, All My Children)
- **Melissa Hayden (Bridget Reardon, Guiding Light)**
- Melina Kanakaredes (Eleni Andros, Guiding Light)
- Heather Tom (Victoria Newman, The Young and the Restless)

=== Outstanding Drama Series Writing Team ===
- Another World
- Days of Our Lives
- **One Life to Live**
- The Young and the Restless

=== Outstanding Drama Series Directing Team ===
- All My Children
- **Guiding Light**
- The Young and the Restless

=== Outstanding Game Show ===
- **Jeopardy!** (Merv Griffin Enterprises/KingWorld)
- The Price Is Right (Mark Goodson Productions/All American Television/CBS)
- Wheel of Fortune (Merv Griffin Enterprises/KingWorld)

=== Outstanding Game Show Host ===
- **Bob Barker** (The Price Is Right)
- Alex Trebek (Jeopardy!)

=== Outstanding Writing in a Children's Series ===
- **Daryl Busby, and Tom J. Astle (Adventures in Wonderland)**
- **Norman Stiles, Lou Berger, Molly Boylan, Sara Compton, Judy Freudberg, Tony Geiss, Ian Ellis James, Emily Perl Kingsley, David Korr, Sonia Manzano, Joey Mazzarino, Nancy Sans, Luis Santeiro, Josh Selig, Jon Stone, Cathi Turow, Belinda Ward, and John Weidman (Sesame Street)**
- Andrew Gutelle, and Ronnie Krauss (Reading Rainbow)
- Fred Rogers (Mister Rogers' Neighborhood)

=== Outstanding Writing in an Animated Program ===
- **Ray Bradbury (The Halloween Tree)**
- Michael Reaves, Brynne Stephens, Paul Dini, Laren Bright, Randy Rogel, Martin Pasko, and Alan Burnett (Batman: The Animated Series)
- Savage Steve Holland, and Bill Kopp (Eek! The Cat)
- Paul Germain, Peter Gaffney, Joe Ansolabehere, Steve Viksten, Rachel Lipman, and Jonathan Greenberg (Rugrats)
- Chris Hubbell, Sam Graham, Diane Dixon, Carol Corwen, Grant Moran, Jim Staahl, Howie Mandel, Jim Fisher, Peter Tilden, and David Castro (Bobby's World)
- John P. McCann, Nicholas Hollander, Tom Minton, Paul Rugg, Deanna Oliver, Tom Ruegger, Sherri Stoner, Randy Rogel, Peter Hastings (Animaniacs)

=== Outstanding Film Sound Editing ===
- **Michael Gollom, Timothy Borquez, Michael Geisler, Tom Jaeger, Greg LaPlante, Kenneth Young, William Griggs, Tim Mertens and Patrick J. Foley (Rocko's Modern Life)**
- Chris Rabideau, Sam Horta, Mark R. Crookston, Julie Gustafson, Stephen Janisz, Timothy J. Garrity and Thomas Syslo (Garfield and Friends)
- Peter Collier and Michele Douglas (The Addams Family)
- Greg LaPlante, Kenneth Young, Timothy J. Garrity, Michael Geisler, Chris Rabideau, John O. Robinson III, Brian F. Mars, Timothy Borquez, Patrick J. Foley, Tom Jaeger and Dominick Certo (The Little Mermaid)

=== Outstanding Music Direction and Composition ===
- **Richard Stone and Steven Bernstein (Animaniacs)**
- Richard S. Kaufman, Mark Watters, Albert Lloyd Olson, James Stemple and Eddie Arkin (The Pink Panther)
- Sarah Durkee, Stephen Lawrence, Jeff Moss, Robby Merkin, Christopher Cerf, Paul Jacobs, Tony Geiss and Dave Conner (Sesame Street)
- Mark Watters (The Little Mermaid)
- Mark Koval (Bobby's World)

=== Outstanding Original Song ===
- **Richard Stone - (Music), and Tom Ruegger - (Lyrics) For the song "Animaniacs Main Title Theme" (Animaniacs)**
- Dominic Messinger - (Lyrics), and Michael Licari - (composer) (Guiding Light)
- Gloria Sklerov (lyricist/composer), Harry Lloyd (lyricist/composer) (As the World Turns)
- Billie Hughes (composer/lyricist), and Roxanne Seeman (lyricist/composer) (Another World)
- Ken Corday (composer), and Tom Langan (lyricist/composer) For the song "Don't Make Me Too Young". (Days of Our Lives)

=== Outstanding Makeup ===
- **Ron Wild, Karen Stephens (Adventures in Wonderland)**
- Karen Borgo-Santo (Maury)
- Reggie Wells (The Oprah Winfrey Show)

=== Outstanding Animated Program ===
- **Howard E. Baker, Norton Virgien, Charles Swenson, Paul Germain, Mary Harrington, Gabor Csupo, Jim Duffy, Geraldine Clarke, Vanessa Coffey, and Arlene Klasky (Rugrats)**
- Andy Heyward, Michael E. Uslan, Michael Maliani, Sean Roche, Benjamin Melniker, and Robby London (Where on Earth Is Carmen Sandiego?: "The Stolen Smile")
- Mario Piluso, Mark Young, and David Kirschner (The Halloween Tree)
- Alan Burnett, Tom Ruegger, Jean MacCurdy, Frank Paur, Dan Riba, Bruce W. Timm, and Eric Radomski (Batman: The Animated Series)
- Steven Spielberg, Sherri Stoner, Rich Arons, Tom Ruegger, Michael Gerard, Alfred Gimeno, Bob Kline, Jenny Lerew, Rusty Mills, Audu Paden, Greg Reyna, Lenord Robinson, Barry Caldwell (Animaniacs)

=== Outstanding Achievement in Art Direction/Set Decoration/Scenic Design ===
- **Sesame Street**
- John & Leeza from Hollywood
- The Prince is Right
- Where in The World is Carmen Sandiego?
- Xuxa

=== Lifetime achievement award ===
- **Dick Clark**
