= Daytime Emmy Award for Outstanding Younger Actor in a Drama Series =

Former television award

- Awarded for: Outstanding Performance by an Actor in a Drama Series, Age 25 or Younger
- Country: United States
- Presented by: NATAS; ATAS
- First award: 1985
- Final award: 2019

Highlights
- Most awards: Jonathan Jackson, (3); Chandler Massey, (3)
- Most nominations: Jonathan Jackson, (6)
- Website: emmyonline.org/daytime
- Related: Award was merged into the Outstanding Younger Performer in a Drama Series category

The Daytime Emmy Award for Outstanding Younger Actor in a Drama Series was an award presented annually by the National Academy of Television Arts and Sciences (NATAS) and Academy of Television Arts & Sciences (ATAS). It was given annually from 1985 to 2019 to honor a young actor below the age of 25, who had delivered an outstanding performance in a role while working within the daytime drama industry.

At the 12th Daytime Emmy Awards held in 1985, Brian Bloom was the first winner of this award for his portrayal of Dusty Donovan on As the World Turns. The awards ceremony had not been aired on television for the prior two years, having been criticized for voting integrity. The award category was originally called Outstanding Young Man or Outstanding Juvenile Male in a Drama Series, and began using its current title in 1991. Years before this category was introduced, networks declined to broadcast the show during a time of voting integrity rumors and waning interest. Confusion rose around the criteria of the new category due to the varying ages of the nominees. Within the first set of nominees, Bloom became the youngest actor nominated for a Daytime Emmy Award at the time at age 15, while the other actors nominated in the category were over 25. The criteria were later altered, requiring that the actor be aged 25 or below.

The award was presented to 27 actors. Guiding Light had the most recipients of this award, with a total of seven wins. In 1992, Kristoff St. John became the first African-American to have garnered the award, winning for his role as Neil Winters on The Young and the Restless. Chandler Massey and Jonathan Jackson were the actors with the most awards, with a total of three each. In 2000, Jackson also became the actor to have received the most nominations, surpassing Bryan Buffington's previous record of five. Scott Clifton, Bryton James, David Lago and Joshua Morrow have also received five nominations each.

At the 2019 ceremony, Kyler Pettis became the last awarded actor in this category for his portrayal of Theo Carver, on Days of Our Lives. In October 2019, the NATAS decided to replace both younger actor and actress categories with a single gender-neutral one: Outstanding Younger Performer in a Drama Series.

== Winners and nominees ==
Listed below are the winners of the award for each year, as well as the other nominees.

Table key
| ‡ | Indicates the winner |

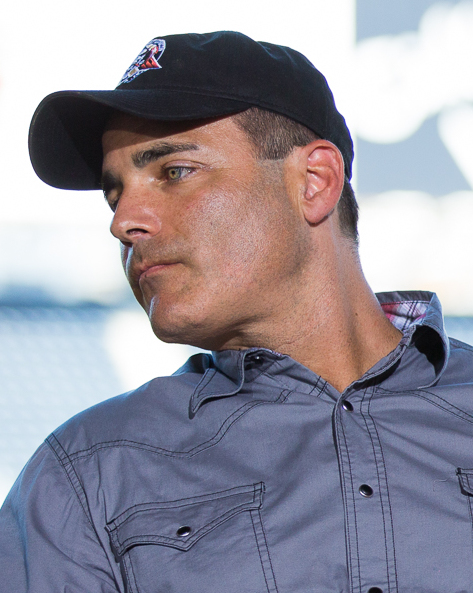
Brian Bloom was the first awarded actor in this category, winning for his role as Dusty Donovan on As the World Turns in 1985.

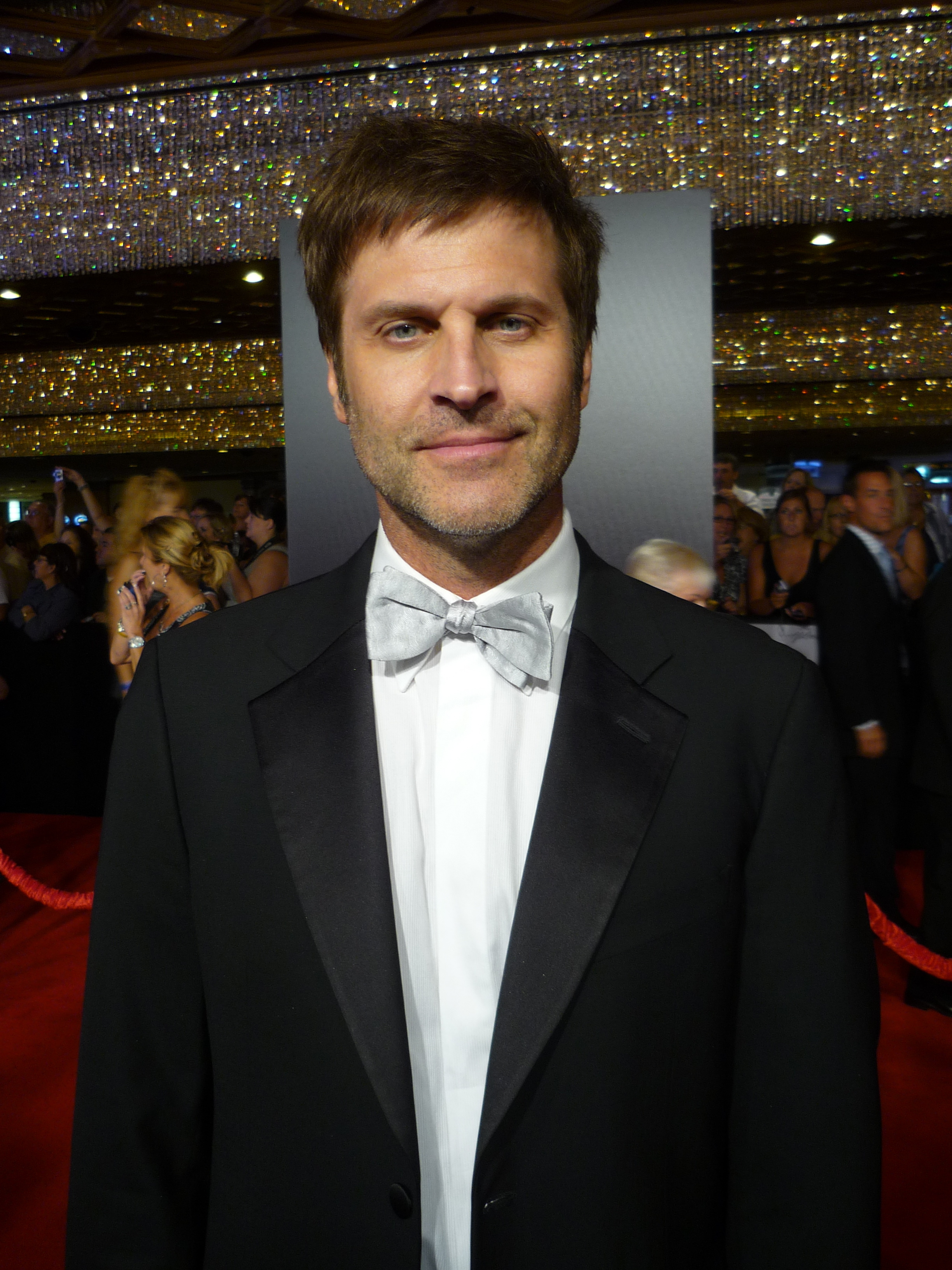
Jon Hensley at the 2010 Daytime Emmy Awards. Hensley was nominated twice for his role as Holden Snyder on As the World Turns.

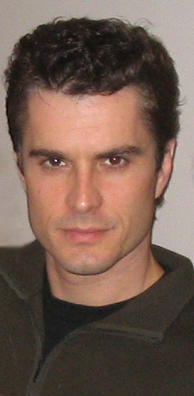
Rick Hearst won in 1991 for his role as Alan-Michael Spaulding on Guiding Light.

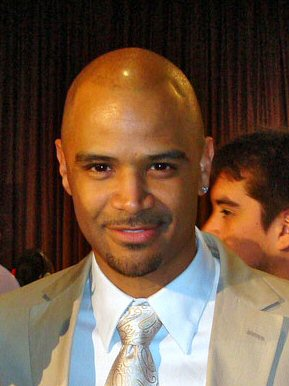
Dondre Whitfield was nominated three times for his role as Terrence Frye on All My Children.

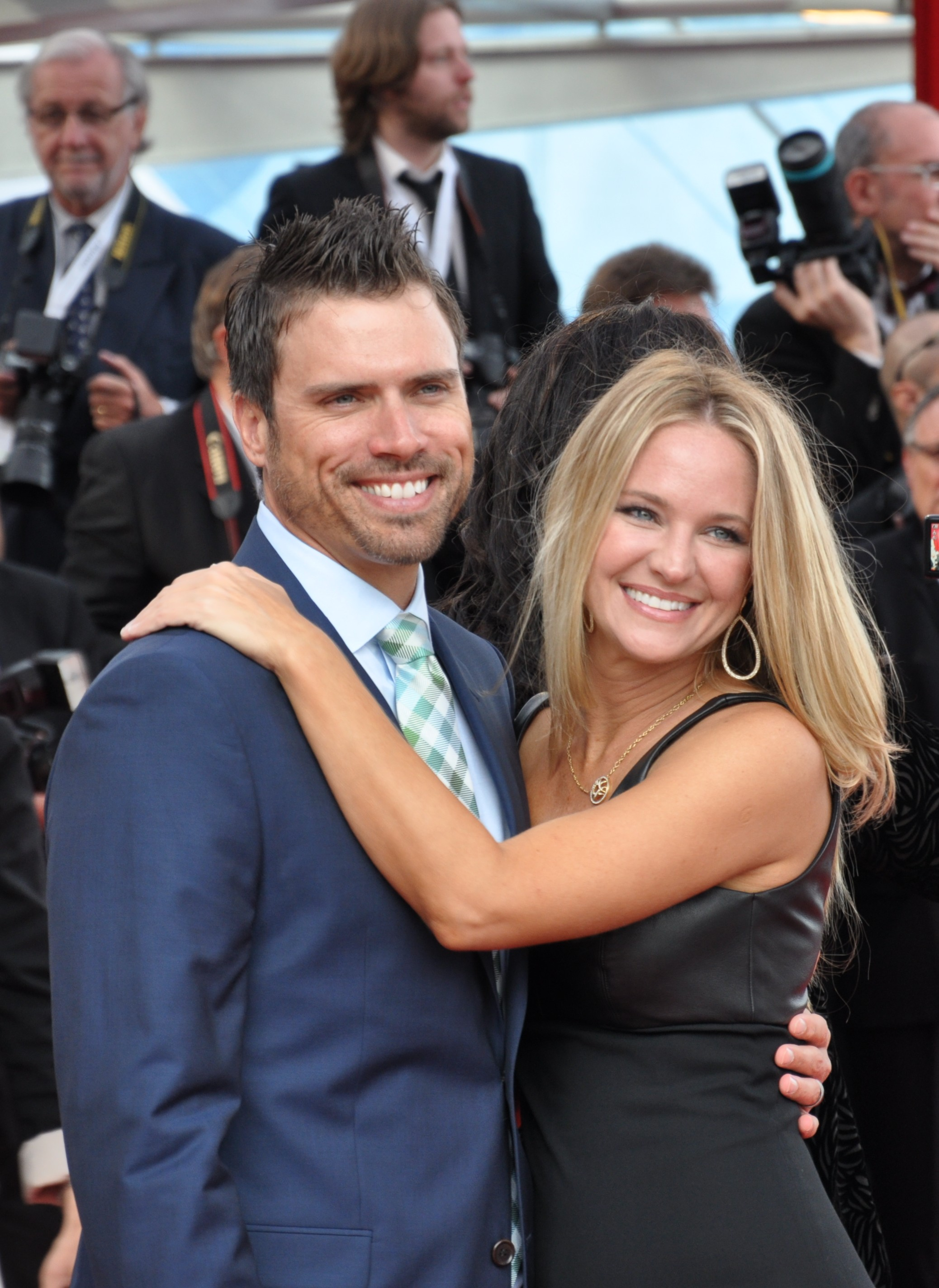
Joshua Morrow (left) was nominated five times for his role as Nicholas Newman on The Young and the Restless.

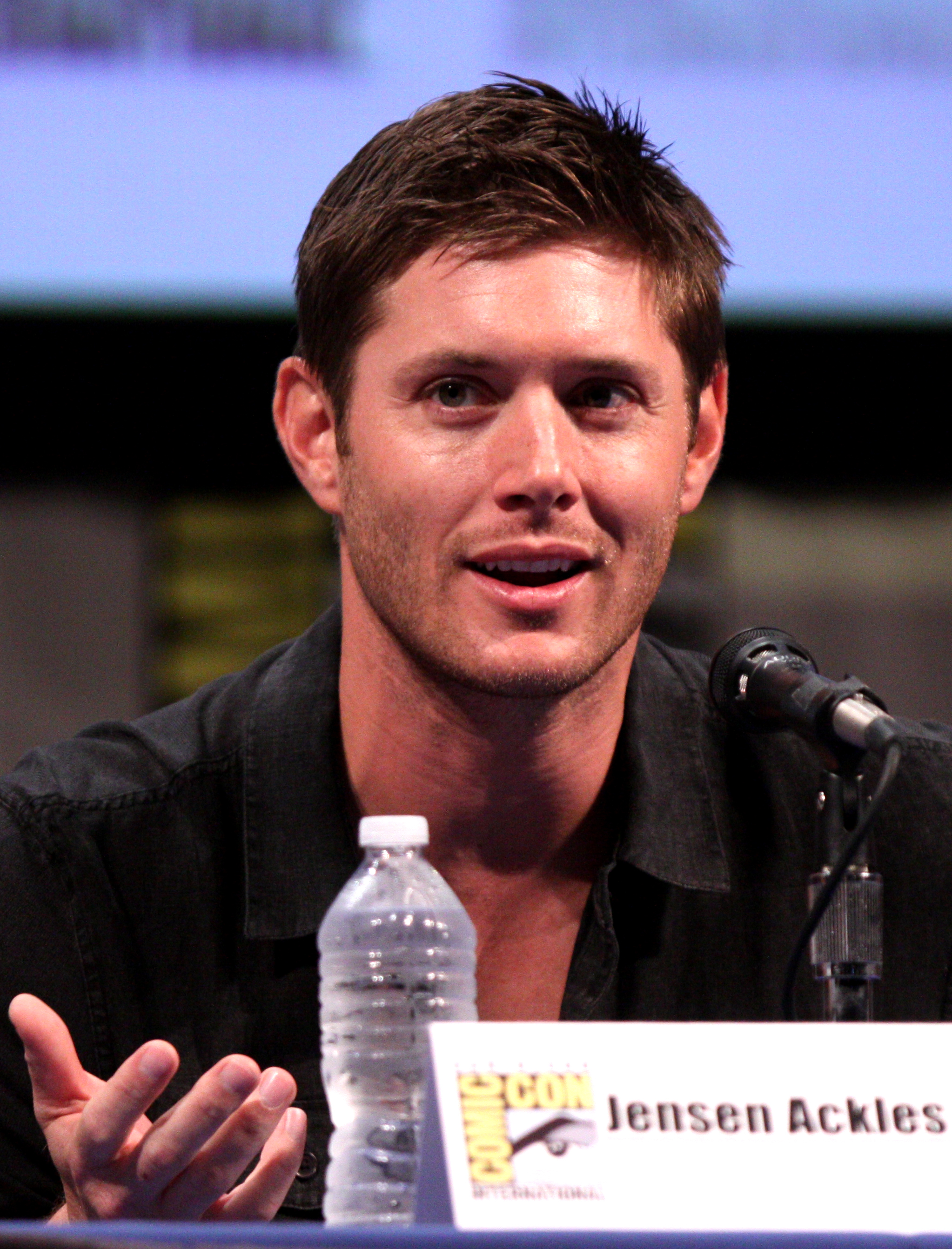
Jensen Ackles was nominated three times for his role as Eric Brady on Days of Our Lives.

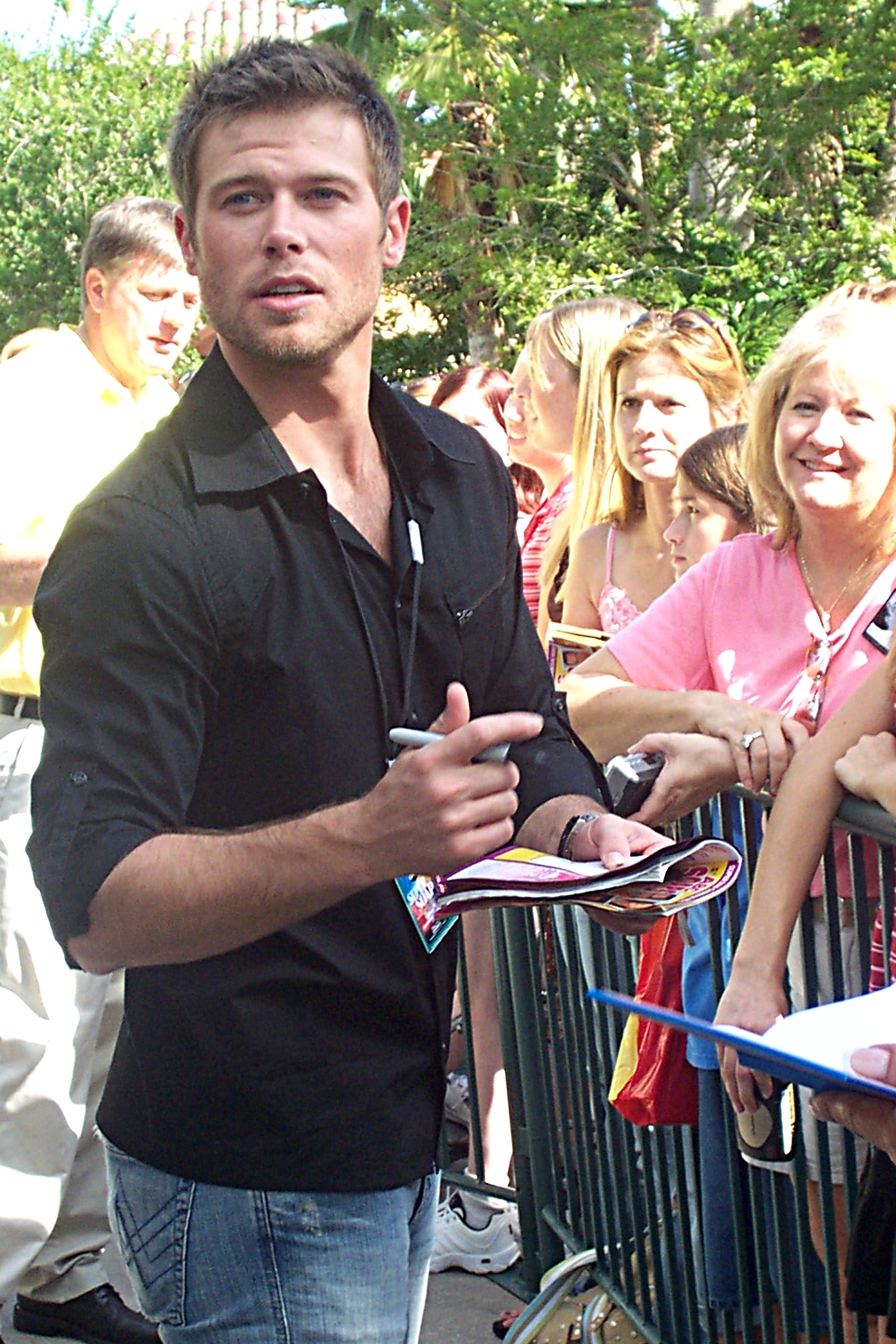
Jacob Young was nominated once for his role as Rick Forrester on The Bold and the Beautiful before winning in 2002 for his role as Lucky Spencer on General Hospital.

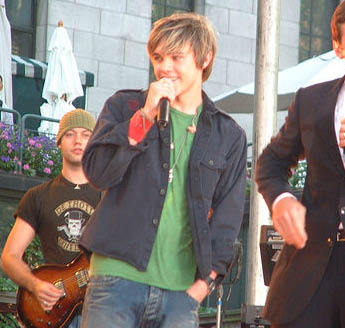
Jesse McCartney was nominated twice for his role as JR Chandler on All My Children.

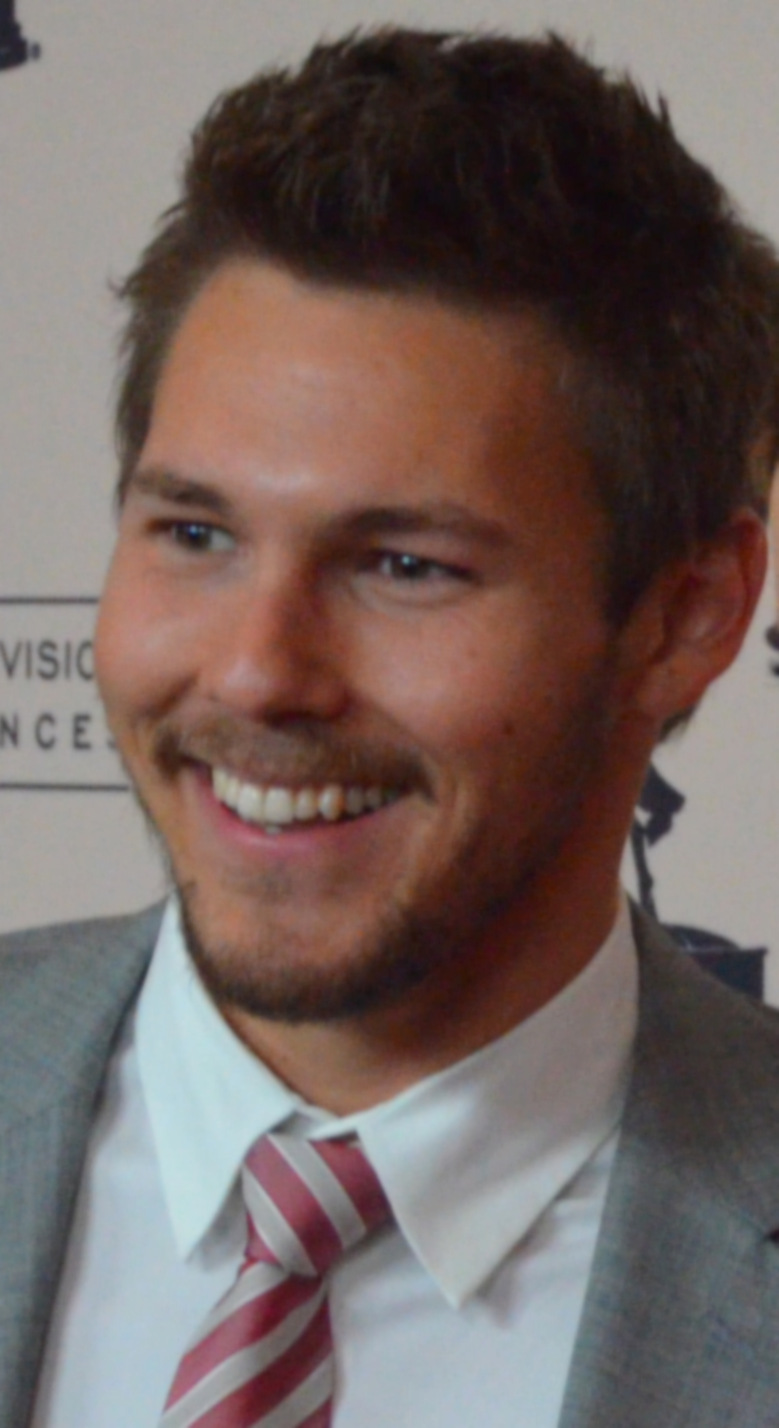
Scott Clifton was nominated three times for his role as Dillon Quartermaine on General Hospital and once for his role as Schuyler Joplin on One Life to Live before winning in 2011 for his role as Liam Cooper on The Bold and the Beautiful.

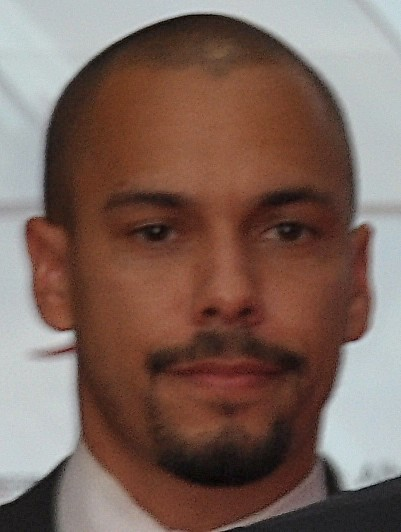
Bryton James received five nominations, winning in 2007 for his role as Devon Hamilton on The Young and the Restless.

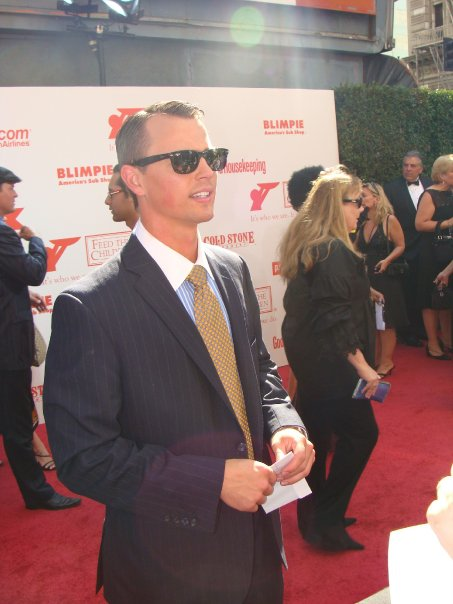
Darin Brooks was nominated in 2008 and won in 2009 for his role as Max Brady on Days of Our Lives.

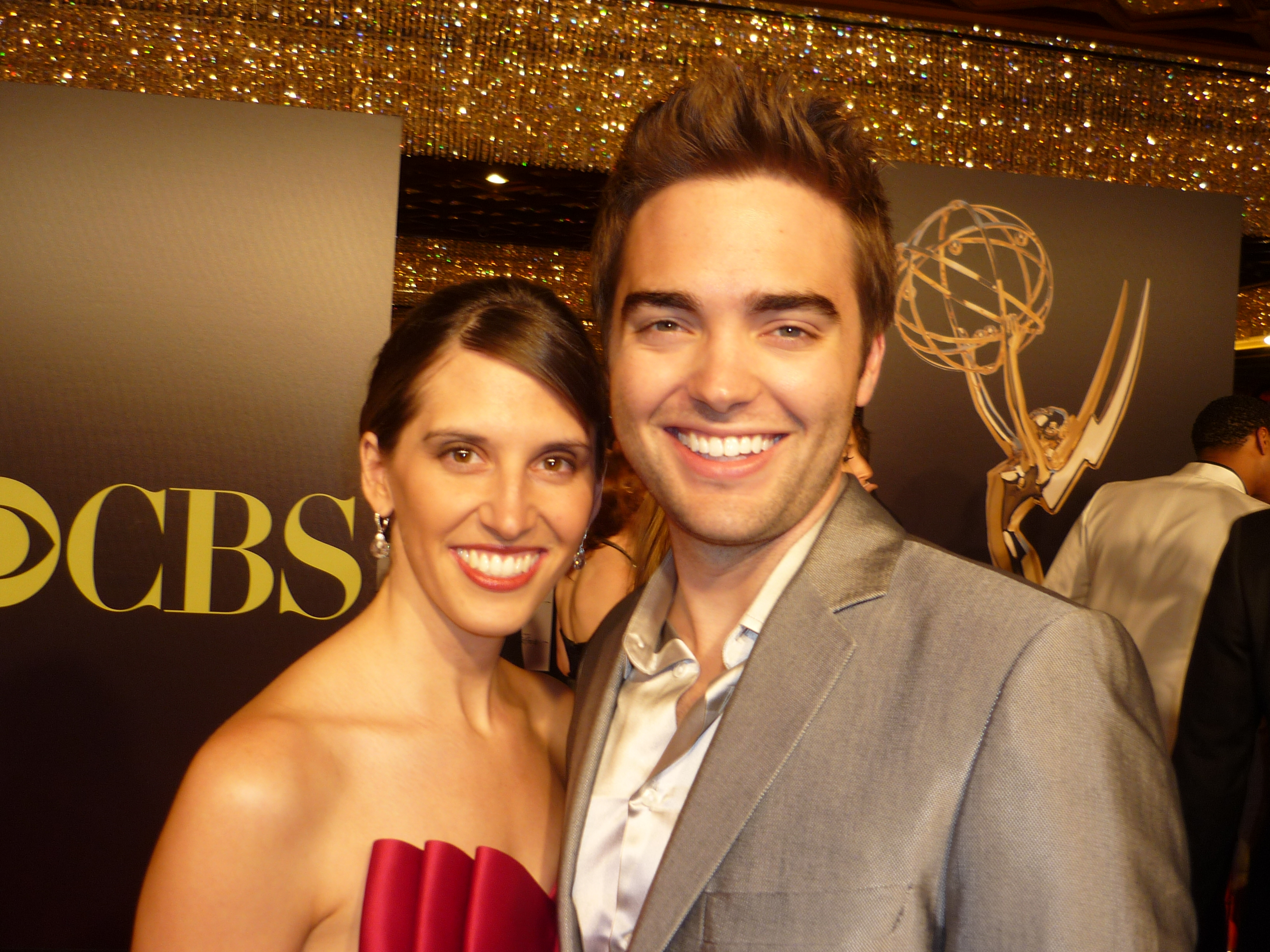
Drew Tyler Bell (right) won in 2010 for his role as Thomas Forrester on The Bold and the Beautiful.

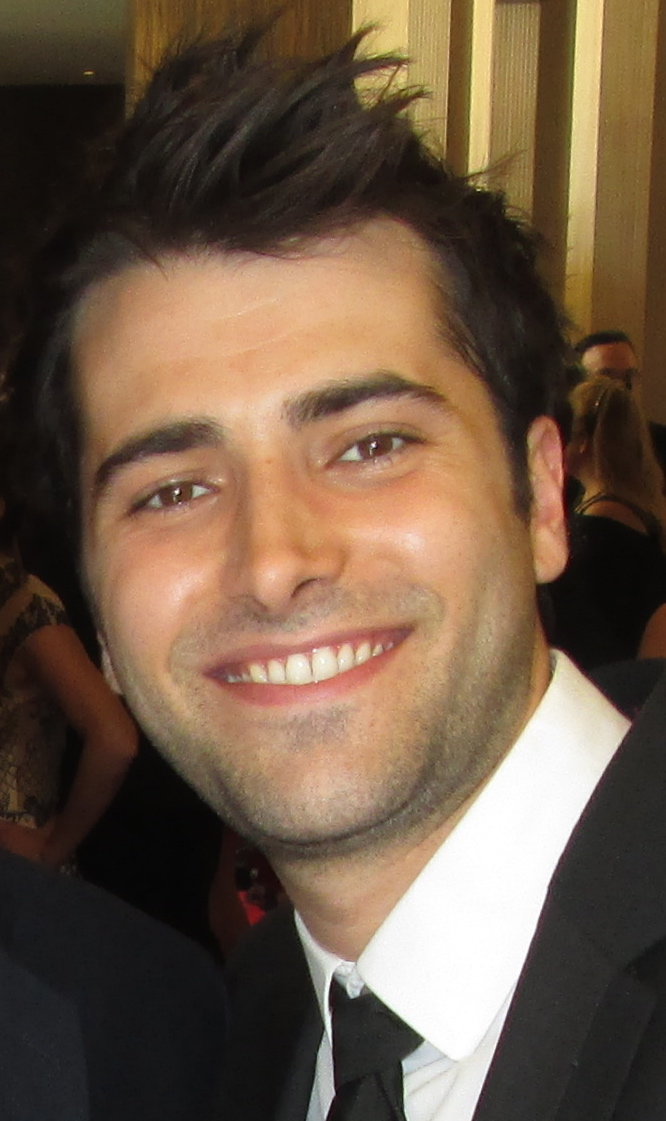
Freddie Smith has won once and been nominated twice for his role as Sonny Kiriakis on Days of Our Lives.

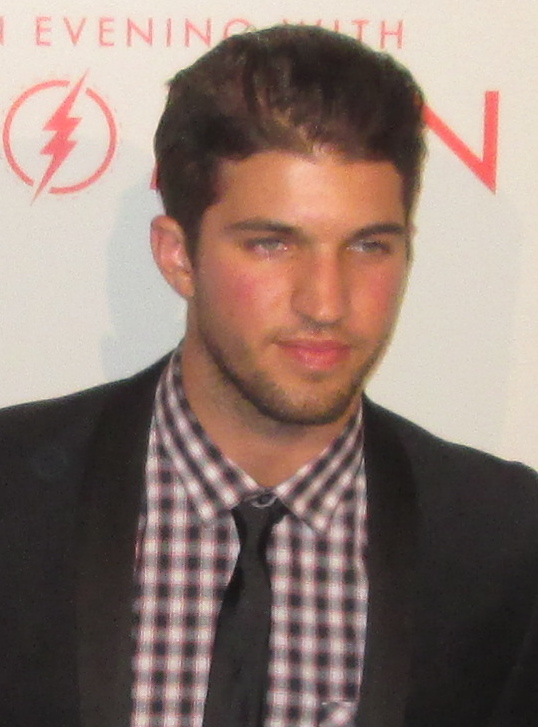
Bryan Craig received four nominations and two wins in 2016 and 2017 for his role as Morgan Corinthos on General Hospital.

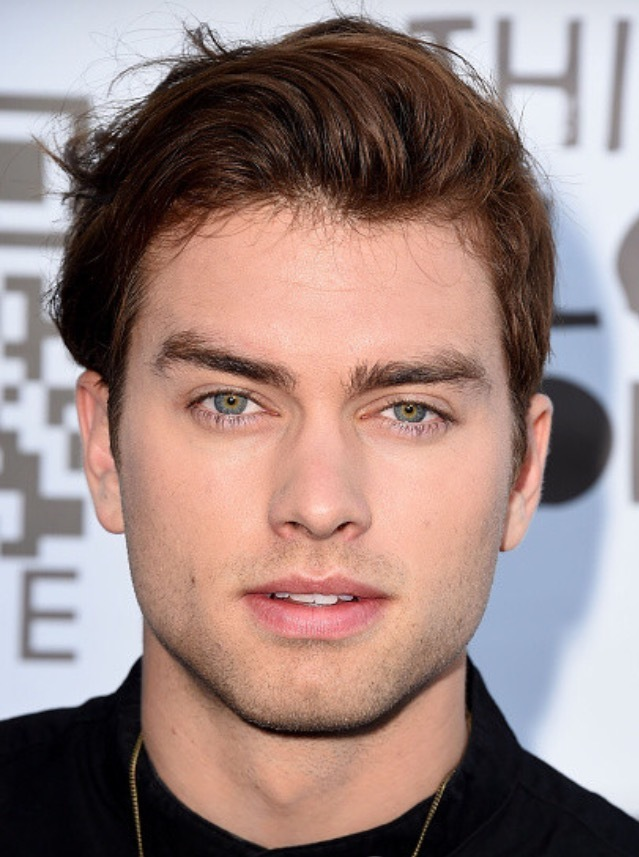
Pierson Fodé was nominated twice, in 2016 and 2017, for his role as Thomas Forrester on The Bold and the Beautiful.

=== 1980s ===
| Year | Actor | Program | Role | Network | Ref. |
1985 (12th)
| 1985 (12th) | Brian Bloom | As the World Turns | Dusty Donovan | CBS | |
| 1985 (12th) | Steve Caffrey | All My Children | Andrew Preston Cortlandt | ABC | |
| 1985 (12th) | Michael E. Knight | All My Children | Tad Martin | ABC | |
| 1985 (12th) | Michael O'Leary | Guiding Light | Rick Bauer | CBS | |
| 1985 (12th) | Jack Wagner | General Hospital | Frisco Jones | ABC | |
1986 (13th)
| 1986 (13th) | Michael E. Knight | All My Children | Tad Martin | ABC | |
| 1986 (13th) | Brian Bloom | As the World Turns | Dusty Donovan | CBS | |
| 1986 (13th) | Jon Hensley | As the World Turns | Holden Snyder | CBS | |
| 1986 (13th) | Vincent Irizarry | Guiding Light | Lujack Luvonoczek | CBS | |
| 1986 (13th) | Don Scardino | Another World | Chris Chapin | NBC | |
1987 (14th)
| 1987 (14th) | Michael E. Knight | All My Children | Tad Martin | ABC | |
| 1987 (14th) | Brian Bloom | As the World Turns | Dusty Donovan | CBS | |
| 1987 (14th) | Jon Hensley | As the World Turns | Holden Snyder | CBS | |
| 1987 (14th) | Grant Show | Ryan's Hope | Rick Hyde | ABC | |
| 1987 (14th) | Billy Warlock | Days of Our Lives | Frankie Brady | NBC | |
1988 (15th)
| 1988 (15th) | Billy Warlock | Days of Our Lives | Frankie Brady | NBC | |
| 1988 (15th) | Scott DeFreitas | As the World Turns | Andy Dixon | CBS | |
| 1988 (15th) | Andrew Kavovit | As the World Turns | Paul Ryan | CBS | |
| 1988 (15th) | Ross Kettle | Santa Barbara | Jeffrey Conrad | NBC | |
| 1988 (15th) | Robert Duncan McNeill | All My Children | Charlie Brent | ABC | |
1989 (16th)
| 1989 (16th) | Justin Gocke | Santa Barbara | Brandon Capwell | NBC | |
| 1989 (16th) | Andrew Kavovit | As the World Turns | Paul Ryan | CBS | |
| 1989 (16th) | Darrell Utley | Days of Our Lives | Benjy Hawk | NBC | |

=== 1990s ===
| Year | Actor | Program | Role | Network | Ref. |
1990 (17th)
| 1990 (17th) | Andrew Kavovit ‡ | As the World Turns | Paul Ryan | CBS | |
| 1990 (17th) | Bryan Buffington | Guiding Light | Bill Lewis III | CBS | |
1991 (18th)
| 1991 (18th) | Rick Hearst ‡ | Guiding Light | Alan-Michael Spaulding | CBS | |
| 1991 (18th) | Bryan Buffington | Guiding Light | Bill Lewis III | CBS | |
| 1991 (18th) | Justin Gocke | Santa Barbara | Brandon Capwell | NBC | |
| 1991 (18th) | Andrew Kavovit | As the World Turns | Paul Ryan | CBS | |
| 1991 (18th) | Kristoff St. John | Generations | Adam Marshall | NBC | |
1992 (19th)
| 1992 (19th) | Kristoff St. John ‡ | The Young and the Restless | Neil Winters | CBS | |
| 1992 (19th) | Scott DeFreitas | As the World Turns | Andy Dixon | CBS | |
| 1992 (19th) | Jeff Phillips | Guiding Light | Hart Jessup | CBS | |
| 1992 (19th) | James Patrick Stuart | All My Children | Will Cortlandt | ABC | |
| 1992 (19th) | Dondre Whitfield | All My Children | Terrence Frye | ABC | |
1993 (20th)
| 1993 (20th) | Monti Sharp ‡ | Guiding Light | David Grant | CBS | |
| 1993 (20th) | Matt Borlenghi | All My Children | Brian Bodine | ABC | |
| 1993 (20th) | Bryan Buffington | Guiding Light | Bill Lewis III | CBS | |
| 1993 (20th) | Kristoff St. John | The Young and the Restless | Neil Winters | CBS | |
| 1993 (20th) | Dondre Whitfield | All My Children | Terrence Frye | ABC | |
1994 (21st)
| 1994 (21st) | Roger Howarth ‡ | One Life to Live | Todd Manning | ABC | |
| 1994 (21st) | Bryan Buffington | Guiding Light | Bill Lewis III | CBS | |
| 1994 (21st) | Scott DeFreitas | As the World Turns | Andy Dixon | CBS | |
| 1994 (21st) | Monti Sharp | Guiding Light | David Grant | CBS | |
| 1994 (21st) | Dondre Whitfield | All My Children | Terrence Frye | ABC | |
1995 (22nd)
| 1995 (22nd) | Jonathan Jackson ‡ | General Hospital | Lucky Spencer | ABC | |
| 1995 (22nd) | Jason Biggs | As the World Turns | Pete Wendall | CBS | |
| 1995 (22nd) | Bryan Buffington | Guiding Light | Bill Lewis III | CBS | |
| 1995 (22nd) | Tommy Michaels | All My Children | Tim Dillon | ABC | |
1996 (23rd)
| 1996 (23rd) | Kevin Mambo ‡ | Guiding Light | Marcus Williams | CBS | |
| 1996 (23rd) | Nathan Fillion | One Life to Live | Joey Buchanan | ABC | |
| 1996 (23rd) | Jonathan Jackson | General Hospital | Lucky Spencer | ABC | |
| 1996 (23rd) | Shemar Moore | The Young and the Restless | Malcolm Winters | CBS | |
| 1996 (23rd) | Joshua Morrow | The Young and the Restless | Nicholas Newman | CBS | |
1997 (24th)
| 1997 (24th) | Kevin Mambo ‡ | Guiding Light | Marcus Williams | CBS | |
| 1997 (24th) | Steve Burton | General Hospital | Jason Morgan | ABC | |
| 1997 (24th) | Jonathan Jackson | General Hospital | Lucky Spencer | ABC | |
| 1997 (24th) | Shemar Moore | The Young and the Restless | Malcolm Winters | CBS | |
| 1997 (24th) | Joshua Morrow | The Young and the Restless | Nicholas Newman | CBS | |
1998 (25th)
| 1998 (25th) | Jonathan Jackson ‡ | General Hospital | Lucky Spencer | ABC | |
| 1998 (25th) | Jensen Ackles | Days of Our Lives | Eric Brady | NBC | |
| 1998 (25th) | Tyler Christopher | General Hospital | Nikolas Cassadine | ABC | |
| 1998 (25th) | Bryant Jones | The Young and the Restless | Nate Hastings | CBS | |
| 1998 (25th) | Kevin Mambo | Guiding Light | Marcus Williams | CBS | |
| 1998 (25th) | Joshua Morrow | The Young and the Restless | Nicholas Newman | CBS | |
1999 (26th)
| 1999 (26th) | Jonathan Jackson ‡ | General Hospital | Lucky Spencer | ABC | |
| 1999 (26th) | Jensen Ackles | Days of Our Lives | Eric Brady | NBC | |
| 1999 (26th) | Jason Winston George | Sunset Beach | Michael Bourne | NBC | |
| 1999 (26th) | Bryant Jones | The Young and the Restless | Nate Hastings | CBS | |
| 1999 (26th) | Joshua Morrow | The Young and the Restless | Nicholas Newman | CBS | |
| 1999 (26th) | Jacob Young | The Bold and the Beautiful | Rick Forrester | CBS | |

=== 2000s ===
| Year | Actor | Program | Role | Network | Ref. |
2000 (27th)
| 2000 (27th) | David Tom ‡ | The Young and the Restless | Billy Abbott | CBS | |
| 2000 (27th) | Jensen Ackles | Days of Our Lives | Eric Brady | NBC | |
| 2000 (27th) | Jonathan Jackson | General Hospital | Lucky Spencer | ABC | |
| 2000 (27th) | Bryant Jones | The Young and the Restless | Nate Hastings | CBS | |
| 2000 (27th) | David Lago | The Young and the Restless | Raul Guittierez | CBS | |
| 2000 (27th) | Joshua Morrow | The Young and the Restless | Nicholas Newman | CBS | |
2001 (28th)
| 2001 (28th) | Justin Torkildsen ‡ | The Bold and the Beautiful | Rick Forrester | CBS | |
| 2001 (28th) | Josh Ryan Evans | Passions | Timmy Lenox | NBC | |
| 2001 (28th) | David Lago | The Young and the Restless | Raul Guittierez | CBS | |
| 2001 (28th) | Jesse McCartney | All My Children | JR Chandler | ABC | |
| 2001 (28th) | Paul Taylor | As the World Turns | Isaac Jenkins | CBS | |
| 2001 (28th) | David Tom | The Young and the Restless | Billy Abbott | CBS | |
2002 (29th)
| 2002 (29th) | Jacob Young ‡ | General Hospital | Lucky Spencer | ABC | |
| 2002 (29th) | Jesse McCartney | All My Children | JR Chandler | ABC | |
| 2002 (29th) | Brian Presley | Port Charles | Jack Ramsey | ABC | |
| 2002 (29th) | Justin Torkildsen | The Bold and the Beautiful | Rick Forrester | CBS | |
| 2002 (29th) | Jordi Vilasuso | Guiding Light | Tony Santos | CBS | |
2003 (30th)
| 2003 (30th) | Jordi Vilasuso ‡ | Guiding Light | Tony Santos | CBS | |
| 2003 (30th) | Chad Brannon | General Hospital | Zander Smith | ABC | |
| 2003 (30th) | David Lago | The Young and the Restless | Raul Guittierez | CBS | |
| 2003 (30th) | Kyle Lowder | Days of Our Lives | Brady Black | NBC | |
| 2003 (30th) | Aiden Turner | All My Children | Aidan Devane | ABC | |
2004 (31st)
| 2004 (31st) | Chad Brannon ‡ | General Hospital | Zander Smith | ABC | |
| 2004 (31st) | Scott Clifton | General Hospital | Dillon Quartermaine | ABC | |
| 2004 (31st) | Agim Kaba | As the World Turns | Aaron Snyder | CBS | |
| 2004 (31st) | David Lago | The Young and the Restless | Raul Guittierez | CBS | |
| 2004 (31st) | Brian Presley | Port Charles | Jack Ramsey | ABC | |
2005 (32nd)
| 2005 (32nd) | David Lago ‡ | The Young and the Restless | Raul Guittierez | CBS | |
| 2005 (32nd) | Scott Clifton | General Hospital | Dillon Quartermaine | ABC | |
| 2005 (32nd) | Michael Graziadei | The Young and the Restless | Daniel Romalotti | CBS | |
| 2005 (32nd) | Tom Pelphrey | Guiding Light | Jonathan Randall | CBS | |
| 2005 (32nd) | Jacob Young | All My Children | JR Chandler | ABC | |
2006 (33rd)
| 2006 (33rd) | Tom Pelphrey ‡ | Guiding Light | Jonathan Randall | CBS | |
| 2006 (33rd) | Scott Clifton | General Hospital | Dillon Quartermaine | ABC | |
| 2006 (33rd) | Michael Graziadei | The Young and the Restless | Daniel Romalotti | CBS | |
| 2006 (33rd) | Bryton James | The Young and the Restless | Devon Hamilton | CBS | |
| 2006 (33rd) | Jesse Soffer | As the World Turns | Will Munson | CBS | |
2007 (34th)
| 2007 (34th) | Bryton James ‡ | The Young and the Restless | Devon Hamilton | CBS | |
| 2007 (34th) | Van Hansis | As the World Turns | Luke Snyder | CBS | |
| 2007 (34th) | Tom Pelphrey | Guiding Light | Jonathan Randall | CBS | |
| 2007 (34th) | Jesse Soffer | As the World Turns | Will Munson | CBS | |
| 2007 (34th) | James Stevenson | Passions | Jared Casey | NBC | |
2008 (35th)
| 2008 (35th) | Tom Pelphrey ‡ | Guiding Light | Jonathan Randall | CBS | |
| 2008 (35th) | Darin Brooks | Days of Our Lives | Max Brady | NBC | |
| 2008 (35th) | Van Hansis | As the World Turns | Luke Snyder | CBS | |
| 2008 (35th) | Bryton James | The Young and the Restless | Devon Hamilton | CBS | |
| 2008 (35th) | Jesse Soffer | As the World Turns | Will Munson | CBS | |
2009 (36th)
| 2009 (36th) | Darin Brooks ‡ | Days of Our Lives | Max Brady | NBC | |
| 2009 (36th) | Blake Berris | Days of Our Lives | Nick Fallon | NBC | |
| 2009 (36th) | E.J. Bonilla | Guiding Light | Rafe Rivera | CBS | |
| 2009 (36th) | Bryton James | The Young and the Restless | Devon Hamilton | CBS | |
| 2009 (36th) | Cornelius Smith Jr. | All My Children | Frankie Hubbard | ABC | |

=== 2010s ===
| Year | Actor | Program | Role | Network | Ref. |
2010 (37th)
| 2010 (37th) | Drew Tyler Bell ‡ | The Bold and the Beautiful | Thomas Forrester | CBS | |
| 2010 (37th) | Scott Clifton | One Life to Live | Schuyler Joplin | ABC | |
| 2010 (37th) | Zack Conroy | Guiding Light | James Spaulding | CBS | |
| 2010 (37th) | Drew Garrett | General Hospital | Michael Corinthos | ABC | |
| 2010 (37th) | Dylan Patton | Days of Our Lives | Will Horton | NBC | |
2011 (38th)
| 2011 (38th) | Scott Clifton ‡ | The Bold and the Beautiful | Liam Spencer | CBS | |
| 2011 (38th) | Chad Duell | General Hospital | Michael Corinthos | ABC | |
| 2011 (38th) | Chandler Massey | Days of Our Lives | Will Horton | NBC | |
2012 (39th)
| 2012 (39th) | Chandler Massey ‡ | Days of Our Lives | Will Horton | NBC | |
| 2012 (39th) | Eddie Alderson | One Life to Live | Matthew Buchanan | ABC | |
| 2012 (39th) | Chad Duell | General Hospital | Michael Corinthos | ABC | |
| 2012 (39th) | Nathan Parsons | General Hospital | Ethan Lovett | ABC | |
2013 (40th)
| 2013 (40th) | Chandler Massey ‡ | Days of Our Lives | Will Horton | NBC | |
| 2013 (40th) | Max Ehrich | The Young and the Restless | Fenmore Baldwin | CBS | |
| 2013 (40th) | Bryton James | The Young and the Restless | Devon Hamilton | CBS | |
| 2013 (40th) | Freddie Smith | Days of Our Lives | Sonny Kiriakis | NBC | |
2014 (41st)
| 2014 (41st) | Chandler Massey ‡ | Days of Our Lives | Will Horton | NBC | |
| 2014 (41st) | Bryan Craig | General Hospital | Morgan Corinthos | ABC | |
| 2014 (41st) | Chad Duell | General Hospital | Michael Corinthos | ABC | |
| 2014 (41st) | Max Ehrich | The Young and the Restless | Fenmore Baldwin | CBS | |
| 2014 (41st) | Daniel Polo | The Young and the Restless | Jamie Vernon | CBS | |
2015 (42nd)
| 2015 (42nd) | Freddie Smith ‡ | Days of Our Lives | Sonny Kiriakis | NBC | |
| 2015 (42nd) | Bryan Craig | General Hospital | Morgan Corinthos | ABC | |
| 2015 (42nd) | Max Ehrich | The Young and the Restless | Fenmore Baldwin | CBS | |
| 2015 (42nd) | Tequan Richmond | General Hospital | TJ Ashford | ABC | |
2016 (43rd)
| 2016 (43rd) | Bryan Craig ‡ | General Hospital | Morgan Corinthos | ABC | |
| 2016 (43rd) | Nicolas Bechtel | General Hospital | Spencer Cassadine | ABC | |
| 2016 (43rd) | Max Ehrich | The Young and the Restless | Fenmore Baldwin | CBS | |
| 2016 (43rd) | Pierson Fodé | The Bold and the Beautiful | Thomas Forrester | CBS | |
| 2016 (43rd) | Tequan Richmond | General Hospital | TJ Ashford | ABC | |
2017 (44th)
| 2017 (44th) | Bryan Craig ‡ | General Hospital | Morgan Corinthos | ABC | |
| 2017 (44th) | Pierson Fodé | The Bold and the Beautiful | Thomas Forrester | CBS | |
| 2017 (44th) | James Lastovic | Days of Our Lives | Joey Johnson | NBC | |
| 2017 (44th) | Tequan Richmond | General Hospital | TJ Ashford | ABC | |
| 2017 (44th) | Anthony Turpel | The Bold and the Beautiful | R.J. Forrester | CBS | |
2018 (45th)
| 2018 (45th) | Rome Flynn ‡ | The Bold and the Beautiful | Zende Forrester Dominguez | CBS | |
| 2018 (45th) | Lucas Adams | Days of Our Lives | Tripp Dalton | NBC | |
| 2018 (45th) | Tristan Lake Leabu | The Young and the Restless | Reed Hellstrom | CBS | |
| 2018 (45th) | Casey Moss | Days of Our Lives | JJ Deveraux | NBC | |
| 2018 (45th) | Hudson West | General Hospital | Jake Webber | ABC | |
2019 (46th)
| 2019 (46th) | Kyler Pettis ‡ | Days of Our Lives | Theo Carver | NBC | |
| 2019 (46th) | Lucas Adams | Days of Our Lives | Tripp Dalton | NBC | |
| 2019 (46th) | William Lipton | General Hospital | Cameron Webber | ABC | |
| 2019 (46th) | Garren Stitt | General Hospital | Oscar Nero | ABC | |
| 2019 (46th) | Zach Tinker | The Young and the Restless | Fenmore Baldwin | CBS | |

== Performers with multiple wins ==
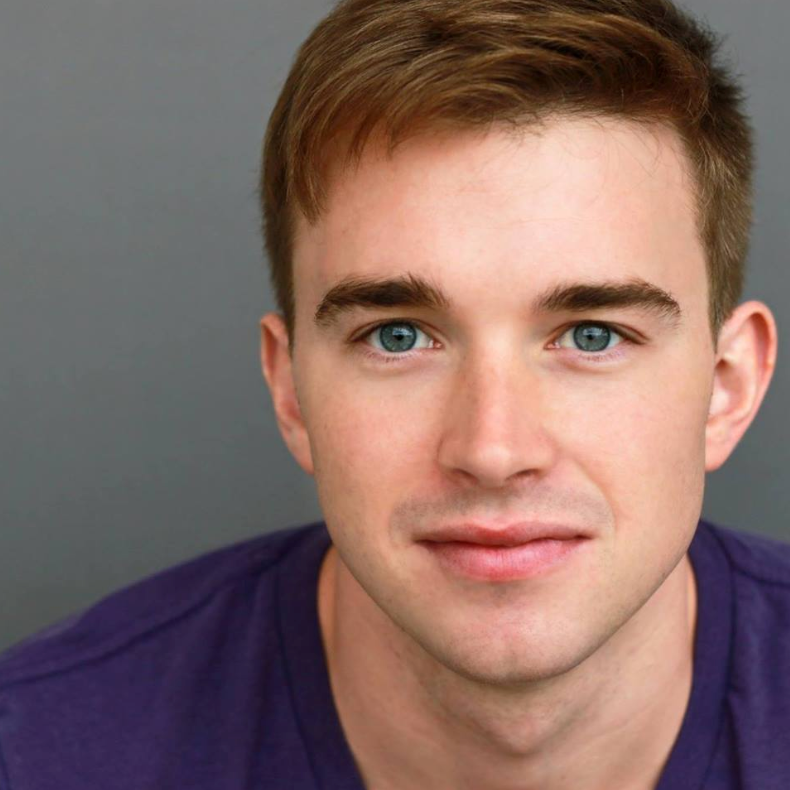
Chandler Massey is the first actor to receive the award for portraying a gay character in this category. He won the award three times, consecutively from 2012 to 2014 for his role of Will Horton on Days of Our Lives.

The following individuals received two or more wins in this category:

3 wins

- Jonathan Jackson
- Chandler Massey

2 wins

- Bryan Craig
- Michael E. Knight
- Kevin Mambo
- Tom Pelphrey

== Performers with multiple nominations ==
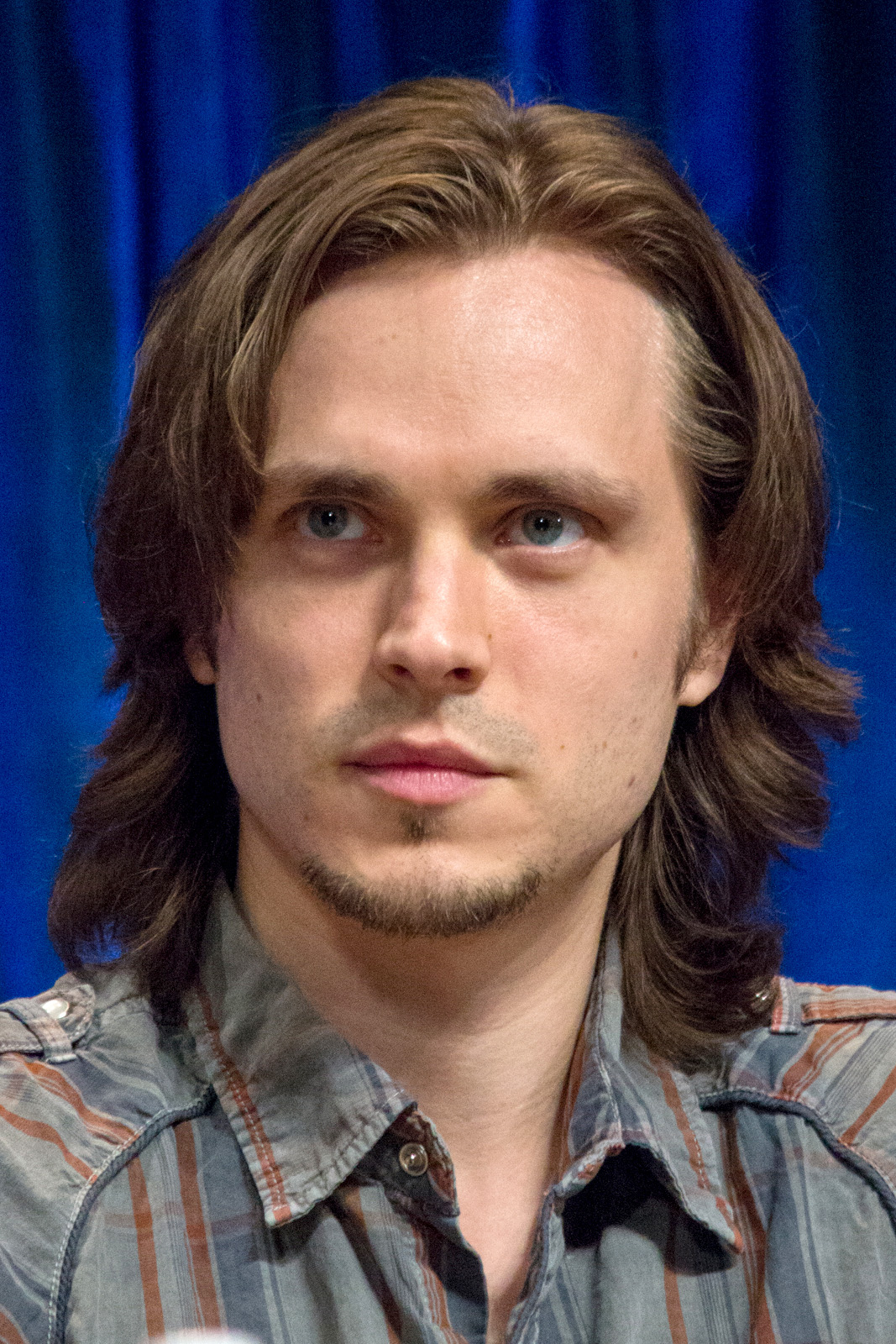
Jonathan Jackson is the actor to have received the most nominations in this category, and one of the actors to have the most wins, with a total of three for his portrayal of Lucky Spencer on General Hospital.

The following individuals received two or more nominations in this category:

6 nominations

- Jonathan Jackson

5 nominations

- Bryan Buffington
- Scott Clifton
- Bryton James
- David Lago
- Joshua Morrow

4 nominations

- Bryan Craig
- Andrew Kavovit
- Chandler Massey
- Tom Pelphrey
- Max Ehrich

3 nominations

- Jensen Ackles
- Brian Bloom
- Scott DeFreitas
- Chad Duell
- Bryant Jones
- Michael E. Knight
- Kevin Mambo
- Tequan Richmond
- Jesse Soffer
- Kristoff St. John
- Dondre Whitfield
- Jacob Young

2 nominations

- Lucas Adams
- Chad Brannon
- Darin Brooks
- Pierson Fodé
- Michael Graziadei
- Justin Gocke
- Van Hansis
- Jon Hensley
- Jesse McCartney
- Shemar Moore
- Brian Presley
- Monti Sharp
- Freddie Smith
- David Tom
- Justin Torkildsen
- Jordi Vilasuso
- Billy Warlock

== Series with most awards ==
7 wins

- Days of Our Lives
- General Hospital
- Guiding Light

4 wins

- The Young and the Restless
- The Bold and the Beautiful

2 wins

- All My Children
- As the World Turns
