= Christopher St. John =

American actor

- Born: United States
- Other name: Chris St. John
- Occupations: Actor, film director, film producer, screenwriter
- Years active: 1968–1988
- Children: Kristoff St. John

Christopher St. John, sometimes credited as Chris St. John, is an American film and television actor. He is also a film producer, film director and screenwriter and played a minor role in the television series Remington Steele.

== Career ==
A member of the Actors Studio starting in the mid-1960s, St. John is best known for playing the role of Ben Buford in the 1971 blaxploitation film Shaft. Between 1968 and 1988, he appeared in eight film and television productions.

In addition to appearing as George Lattimer in Top of the Heap (1972), St. John wrote, directed, and produced the film. It was entered into the 22nd Berlin International Film Festival and was nominated for the Golden Bear, the festival's biggest prize. Richard Brody in The New Yorker described the film as a "crucial work of Afrofuturism."

In 2014, the documentary film that St. John began in 1980, A Man Called God, debuted at the San Diego Black Film Festival. The film was co-directed with his son Kristoff St. John.

== Personal life ==
He had one son, actor Kristoff St. John, who died on February 3, 2019.
