= Bryton James =

American actor (born 1986)

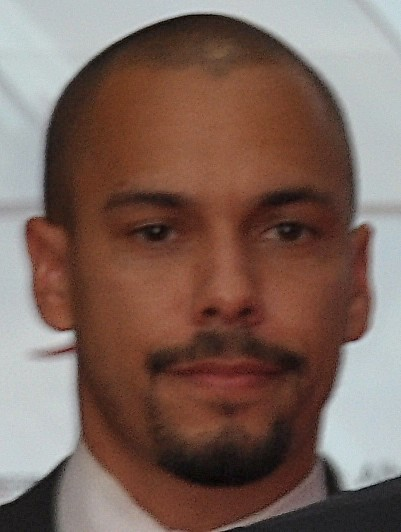
- James in 2015
- Born: Bryton Eric McClure; August 17, 1986 (age 40); Lakewood, California, U.S.
- Other name: Bryton
- Occupation: Actor
- Years active: 1990–present
- Notable work: Richie Crawford on Family Matters (1990–1998); Devon Hamilton in The Young and the Restless (2004–present)
- Spouses: Ashley Leisinger (m. 2011; div. 2014) Jahaira Myers (m. 2025; div. 2026)

Bryton Eric McClure (born August 17, 1986), also credited as Bryton James and mononymously as Bryton, is an American musical theater, film and television actor. As a child actor, he played Richie Crawford on the ABC/CBS sitcom Family Matters. He currently plays Devon Hamilton on the CBS soap opera The Young and the Restless for which he won two Daytime Emmy Awards.

== Early life ==
Bryton James was born in Lakewood, California, to Eric McClure (1961–2016) and Bette McClure, and raised in Fullerton, California. James was exposed to music early in life through his father, who was a musician, songwriter, and music producer.

== Career ==
James started in show business when he was two years old. He appeared in commercials and magazine ads, including one with singer Michael Jackson. At the age of four, he began portraying Richie Crawford on the sitcom Family Matters, where he appeared from 1990 to 1997 in over 200 episodes. He has portrayed Devon Hamilton on the CBS soap opera The Young and the Restless since June 2004. He won the 2007 Daytime Emmy Award for Outstanding Younger Actor in a Drama Series, and earned nominations for the same award in 2006 and 2008. After being nominated for the NAACP Image Award for Outstanding Actor in a Daytime Drama Series from 2005 through 2008, James won the award in 2009.

James was a guest star in the drama The Vampire Diaries during its second season as warlock Luka Martin. He voices Jason James/Z-Strap on Nicktoons animated series Zevo-3 and Virgil Hawkins/Static in Young Justice. He has provided the voice of Mark Surge in Hero Factory. His credits also include voice acting work as Freddie on the animated series The Kids from Room 402, Mowgli on The Jungle Book CD-ROM, and Zare Leonis on Star Wars Rebels. Additionally, James was a recording artist and performed on Disney Channel and other U.S. and international networks.

In July 2018, it was announced that James had joined the cast of Nickelodeon's animated series Glitch Techs. In 2020, he won the Daytime Emmy Award for Best Supporting Actor in a drama series for The Young and the Restless.

== Personal life ==
James married Ashley Leisinger on March 16, 2011. The ceremony was officiated by his The Young and the Restless co-star Christian LeBlanc. In June 2014, James confirmed that he and Leisinger have since divorced but are still close friends. He began dating his co-star Brytni Sarpy in May 2019. In March 2025, James married Jahaira James. That October, he filed for divorce, which was finalized in March 2026.

James is best friends with his The Young and the Restless co-star Christel Khalil, saying about their friendship: "Christel and I have practically grown up together and have experienced some of the same things in our adult lives. We've always had each other's backs. I'm an only child and Christel is the closest thing I have to a sibling." James is the godfather to Khalil's oldest child, Michael Caden. He is also godfather to former The Young and the Restless co-star, Daniel Goddard's eldest son, Ford.

James is a spokesperson for many charitable organizations and founded RADDKids (Recording Artists, Actors, and Athletes Against Drunk Driving) in 1996.

== Filmography ==
Year	Title	Role	Notes
1990–1997	Family Matters	Richie Crawford	Series regular, seasons 2 to 7, recurring, season 8 to 9
1998	Smart Guy	Cory	Episode: "Bad Boy"
1998	The Puzzle Place	Cousin Tim	Episode: "You Don't Match"
1999	The Kids from Room 402	Freddie Fay	Voice, episode: "Son of Einstein"
2004–present	The Young and the Restless	Devon Hamilton	Series regular
2009	The Intruders	Cory	Minor role
2010–2011	Zevo-3	Jason James/Z-Strap	Voice, main role
2010–2011	The Vampire Diaries	Luka Martin	Recurring, 7 episodes
2010	LEGO HERO Factory: Rise of the Rookies	Surge	Voice, television film
2010–2013	Hero Factory	Mark Surge	Voice, miniseries
2012–2014	Winx Club	Roy, additional voices	Voice
2013	Miles Across the Sea	Eli	Voice, episode: "Bed-Headed Fred"
2013–2022	Young Justice	Virgil Hawkins/Static, M'Chiste	Voice, recurring role
2014–2015	Star Wars Rebels	Zare Leonis	Voice, 2 episodes
2015	DC Super Friends	Cyborg	Voice, 7 episodes
2021–2022	Pacific Rim: The Black	Corey	Voice
2022	Tales of the Jedi	Village Brother	Voice, episode: "Resolve"
2025	Beyond The Gates	Devon Hamilton	Crossover with The Young and the Restless

=== Video games ===
Year	Title	Role	Notes
2000	The Jungle Book Groove Party	Mowgli	Also known as The Jungle Book Rhythm N'Groove

=== Audiobooks ===
Year	Title	Role
2015	Rain of the Ghosts	Charlie Dauphin

== Awards and nominations ==
List of awards and nominations for Bryton James
Year	Award	Category	Work	Result	Ref.
1998	Young Artist Award	The Michael Landon Award — Outstanding Contribution to Youth Through Television	Himself	Won	
2005	NAACP Image Award	Outstanding Actor in a Daytime Drama Series	The Young and the Restless	Nominated	
2006	Daytime Emmy Award	Outstanding Younger Actor in a Drama Series	The Young and the Restless	Nominated	
2006	NAACP Image Award	Outstanding Actor in a Daytime Drama Series	The Young and the Restless	Nominated	
2007	Daytime Emmy Award	Outstanding Younger Actor in a Drama Series	The Young and the Restless	Won	
2007	NAACP Image Award	Outstanding Actor in a Daytime Drama Series	The Young and the Restless	Nominated	
2008	Daytime Emmy Award	Outstanding Younger Actor in a Drama Series	The Young and the Restless	Nominated	
2008	NAACP Image Award	Outstanding Actor in a Daytime Drama Series	The Young and the Restless	Won	
2009	Daytime Emmy Award	Outstanding Younger Actor in a Drama Series	The Young and the Restless	Nominated	
2009	NAACP Image Award	Outstanding Actor in a Daytime Drama Series	The Young and the Restless	Won	
2010	NAACP Image Award	Outstanding Actor in a Daytime Drama Series	The Young and the Restless	Nominated	
2012	NAACP Image Award	Outstanding Actor in a Daytime Drama Series	The Young and the Restless	Nominated	
2013	Daytime Emmy Award	Outstanding Younger Actor in a Drama Series	The Young and the Restless	Nominated	
2016	Daytime Emmy Award	Outstanding Supporting Actor in a Drama Series	The Young and the Restless	Nominated	
2019	Daytime Emmy Award	Outstanding Supporting Actor in a Drama Series	The Young and the Restless	Nominated	
2020	Daytime Emmy Award	Outstanding Supporting Actor in a Drama Series	The Young and the Restless	Won	
2021	Daytime Emmy Award	Outstanding Supporting Actor in a Drama Series	The Young and the Restless	Nominated	
2021	Soap Awards France	Best International Actor	The Young and the Restless	Nominated	
2022	Daytime Emmy Award	Outstanding Supporting Actor in a Drama Series	The Young and the Restless	Nominated	
2024	Daytime Emmy Award	Outstanding Supporting Actor in a Drama Series	The Young and the Restless	Nominated	
