= Justin Gocke =

American actor (1978–2014)

Justin Gocke (January 31, 1978 – September 8, 2014) was an American actor.

Justin Gocke was born in Los Angeles, California, the son of Steve and Loren Gocke. As a former child actor, he is known for his role as Brandon Capwell (1987–1993) on the daytime television series Santa Barbara for which he won a Daytime Emmy Award for Outstanding Younger Actor in a Drama Series. He was also in a movie with Farrah Fawcett in 1984, The Burning Bed, as well as The Witching of Ben Wagner (1990), and My Grandpa is a Vampire (1992). He was in one of the final episodes of Highway to Heaven in The Summer Camp 1989 episode.

Gocke died on September 8, 2014. According to the results of the investigator with the Los Angeles Medical Examiner-Coroner's office, Gocke died from a gunshot wound to the head, which was ruled a suicide.

== Filmography ==
Year	Title	Role	Notes
1985	Godzilla 1985	Kyle	(US version)
1988	A Time of Destiny	Young Martin	
1992	My Grandpa Is a Vampire	Lonny	(final film role)
