= Kristoff St. John =

American actor (1966–2019)

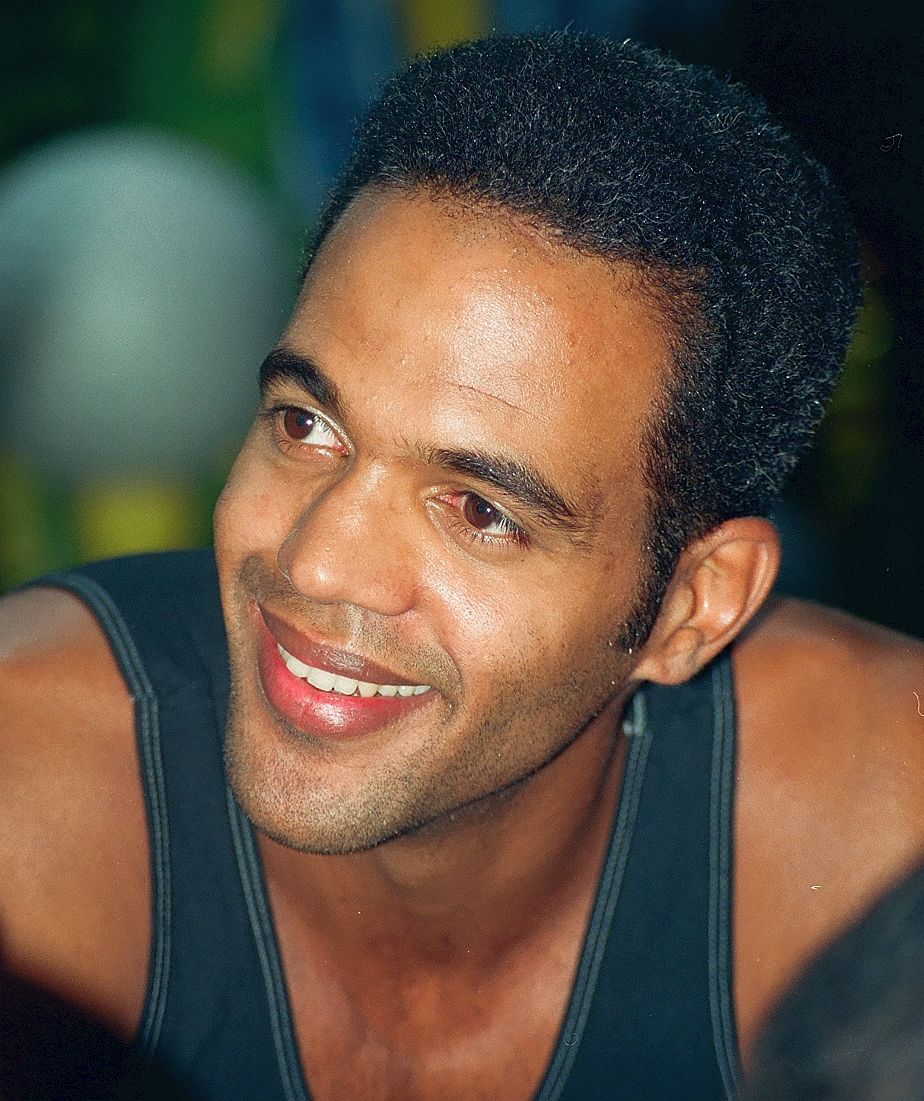
- St. John in 2000
- Born: July 15, 1966; New York City, New York, U.S.
- Died: February 3, 2019 (aged 52); Los Angeles, California, U.S.
- Resting place: Valley Oaks Memorial Park, Westlake Village, California, U.S.
- Other name: Christoff St. John
- Occupation: Actor
- Years active: 1975–2019
- Known for: Roots: The Next Generations; Generations; The Young and the Restless
- Spouses: Mia St. John (m. 1991; div. 1995) Allana Nadal (m. 2001; div. 2007)
- Children: 3
- Parent: Christopher St. John

Kristoff St. John (July 15, 1966 – February 3, 2019) was an American actor best known for playing Neil Winters on the CBS daytime soap opera The Young and the Restless from 1991 until his death in 2019. Playing the role of Neil earned him two Daytime Emmy Awards from eleven nominations, and ten NAACP Image Awards. He was also known for his role as Adam Marshall in the NBC soap opera Generations, for which he received two Daytime Emmy Award nominations; and his role as a young Alex Haley on the ABC miniseries Roots: The Next Generations.

== Early life ==
Kristoff St. John was born July 15, 1966, in New York City and grew up in Bridgeport, Connecticut, and Los Angeles. His father, Christopher St. John, is a producer, actor and director, while his step mother, Marie, is an entertainer. He was of African-American, Portuguese, and Polish descent.

== Career ==
As a ten-year-old child, St. John had a featuring role on the Saturday-morning comedy Big John, Little John, broadcast on NBC in 1976. St. John portrayed a young Alex Haley in the 1979 ABC miniseries Roots: The Next Generations. He also made a small appearance as Booker Brown on the ABC sitcom Happy Days, as well as a boyfriend of Denise Huxtable on an early episode of The Cosby Show. In his first major role, he appeared as Charlie Richmond Jr. in the 1985 CBS sitcom Charlie & Co.

St. John's first major soap role was Adam Marshall on the NBC soap opera, Generations. After the show's cancellation in 1991, he originated the role of Neil Winters on The Young and the Restless, and played the character for 28 years; no African American actor had appeared on the series more frequently than St. John. In 1992, he won the Daytime Emmy Award for Outstanding Younger Actor in a Drama Series for his role. On September 5, 1994, he hosted CBS Soap Break.

In 2005, St. John became a special host for TV Guide Channel. In 2007, he received his fifth Daytime Emmy nomination. He was nominated for Outstanding Supporting Actor. In 2008, St. John won his second Daytime Emmy, as Outstanding Supporting Actor in a Drama Series.

In 2014, A Man Called God, a documentary that St. John co-directed with his father Christopher St. John, debuted at the San Diego Black Film Festival. The film was awarded there, and at other festivals such as the American Documentary Film Festival, and the Beverly Hills Film Festival.

Kristoff's final appearance as Neil aired on February 6, 2019. Late in April, it was revealed that Neil had died of a stroke.

== Personal life ==
St. John was married and divorced twice. He had a son Julian (1989–2014) and a daughter Paris Nicole (born 1992) with his first wife, boxer Mia St. John. Julian died by suicide on November 23, 2014, following a long history of mental illness. St. John was married to Allana Nadal from 2001 to 2007, and they had a daughter, Lola (born April 15, 2003). On August 31, 2018, he was engaged to Russian model Kseniya Olegovna Mikhaleva.

St. John was a vegan and animal rights advocate; he appeared in two PETA ad campaigns.

== Death ==
St. John died at his Los Angeles, California, home on February 3, 2019, at age 52. His death was ruled accidental with the cause listed as hypertrophic cardiomyopathy.

== Filmography ==
Year	Title	Role	Notes
1975	That's My Mama	Andy	Episode: "Weekend Daddy"
1976–1977	Big John, Little John	Homer	11 episodes
1976	Happy Days	Booker Brown	Episode: "Football Frolics"
1977	Wonder Woman	Linc	Episode: "The Bushwhackers", (as Christoff St. John)
1977	The San Pedro Beach Bums	Ralphie	
1979	The Champ	Sonny	
1979	Roots: The Next Generations	Young Alex Haley	26 episodes, (as Christoff St. John)
1979–1980	The Bad News Bears	Ahmad Abdul Rahim	26 episodes, (as Christoff St. John)
1982	Sister, Sister	Daniel "Danny" Burton	TV movie
1984	The Cosby Show	David James	Episode: "How Ugly Is He?"
1985–1986	Charlie & Co.	Charlie Richmond Jr.	18 episodes
1988	A Different World	E.Z. Brooks	Episode: "Advise and Descent" 1988
1988	What's Happening Now!!	Beautiful Bob Bledso	Episode: "The candidate"
1989–1991	Generations	Adam Marshall	208 episodes
1989	Finish Line	Tito Landreau	TV movie
1991–2019	The Young and the Restless	Neil Winters	Series regular
1995	CBS Soap Break	Host	
1995	Hangin' with Mr. Cooper	Eric	6 episodes
1996	Martin	Fred Livingston	Episode: "Kicked to the Curb"
1996	The Crew	Darnell	Episodes: "Winds of Change" Parts 1 & 2
1997	The Jamie Foxx Show	Morris	Episode: "Break Yourself, Fool"
1997	Living Single	Norwood	Episode: "Reconcilable Differences"
1997	The Nanny	Himself	
1998	Family Matters	D'Andre	Episode: "Throw Urkel from the Train"
2002	Trois 2: Pandora's Box	Victor DuBois	
2005	Carpool Guy	Steven	
2007	Spiritual Warriors	Hospital Administrator	
2009	Everybody Hates Chris	Himself	Episode: "Everybody Hates Spring Break"
2013	20 Feet Below: The Darkness Descending	Smitty	
2013	The First Family	C.J. Patton	Episode: "The First Pitch"
2014	A Man Called God	Director	Documentary film co-directed with Christopher St. John
2017	A Christmas Cruise	Jake	TV movie
2019	Home Is Where The Killer Is	Dr. Fredericks	(final film role)

== Awards and nominations ==
Year	Award	Work	Result	Ref
1985	Young Artist Award for Best Young Actor Starring in a New Television Series	Charlie & Co.	Nominated	
1990	Daytime Emmy Award for Outstanding Supporting Actor in a Drama Series	Generations	Nominated	
1991	Daytime Emmy Award for Outstanding Younger Actor in a Drama Series	Generations	Nominated	
1992	Daytime Emmy Award for Outstanding Younger Actor in a Drama Series	The Young and the Restless	Won	
1993	Soap Opera Digest Award for Outstanding Younger Leading Actor	The Young and the Restless	Nominated	
1993	NAACP Image Award for Outstanding Actor in a Daytime Drama Series	The Young and the Restless	Won	
1994	NAACP Image Award for Outstanding Actor in a Daytime Drama Series	The Young and the Restless	Won	
1996	NAACP Image Award for Outstanding Actor in a Daytime Drama Series	The Young and the Restless	Won	
1997	NAACP Image Award for Outstanding Actor in a Daytime Drama Series	The Young and the Restless	Won	
1998	NAACP Image Award for Outstanding Actor in a Daytime Drama Series	The Young and the Restless	Nominated	
1999	NAACP Image Award for Outstanding Actor in a Daytime Drama Series	The Young and the Restless	Nominated	
2000	NAACP Image Award for Outstanding Actor in a Daytime Drama Series	The Young and the Restless	Nominated	
2001	NAACP Image Award for Outstanding Actor in a Daytime Drama Series	The Young and the Restless	Nominated	
2002	NAACP Image Award for Outstanding Actor in a Daytime Drama Series	The Young and the Restless	Nominated	
2003	NAACP Image Award for Outstanding Actor in a Daytime Drama Series	The Young and the Restless	Won	
2003	Soap Opera Digest Award for Outstanding Supporting Actor	The Young and the Restless	Nominated	
2004	NAACP Image Award for Outstanding Actor in a Daytime Drama Series	The Young and the Restless	Won	
2005	NAACP Image Award for Outstanding Actor in a Daytime Drama Series	The Young and the Restless	Nominated	
2006	NAACP Image Award for Outstanding Actor in a Daytime Drama Series	The Young and the Restless	Nominated	
2007	NAACP Image Award for Outstanding Actor in a Daytime Drama Series	The Young and the Restless	Won	
2007	Daytime Emmy Award for Outstanding Supporting Actor in a Drama Series	The Young and the Restless	Nominated	
2008	Daytime Emmy Award for Outstanding Supporting Actor in a Drama Series	The Young and the Restless	Won	
2008	NAACP Image Award for Outstanding Actor in a Daytime Drama Series	The Young and the Restless	Won	
2013	NAACP Image Award for Outstanding Actor in a Daytime Drama Series	The Young and the Restless	Won	
2014	NAACP Image Award for Outstanding Actor in a Daytime Drama Series	The Young and the Restless	Won	
2015	Daytime Emmy Award for Outstanding Supporting Actor in a Drama Series	The Young and the Restless	Nominated	
2016	Daytime Emmy Award for Outstanding Lead Actor in a Drama Series	The Young and the Restless	Nominated	
2017	Daytime Emmy Award for Outstanding Lead Actor in a Drama Series	The Young and the Restless	Nominated	
