= Mr. Destiny =

1990 film by James Orr

- Theatrical release poster
- Directed by: James Orr
- Written by: James Orr; Jim Cruickshank
- Produced by: James Orr; Jim Cruickshank
- Starring: James Belushi; Linda Hamilton; Jon Lovitz; Hart Bochner; Michael Caine
- Cinematography: Alex Thomson
- Edited by: Michael R. Miller
- Music by: David Newman
- Production companies: Touchstone Pictures; Silver Screen Partners IV; Laurence Mark Productions
- Distributed by: Buena Vista Pictures Distribution
- Release date: October 12, 1990
- Running time: 110 minutes
- Country: United States
- Language: English
- Budget: $20 million
- Box office: $15.3 million

Mr. Destiny is a 1990 American fantasy comedy film directed by James Orr, and starring Jim Belushi, Linda Hamilton, Michael Caine, Jon Lovitz, Courteney Cox, Jay O. Sanders and Rene Russo. It is heavily inspired by the 1946 film It's a Wonderful Life.

In the film, a man in his 30s blames most of his life's problems on his failure in a baseball game during his adolescence. His guardian angel grants him the wish to see that failure corrected. The man is transported to an alternative reality where he has had a more successful career and a more powerful position. The price is that he has lost his loved ones from his previous life and has multiple new enemies.

== Plot ==
The story begins on "the strangest day" of Larry Burrows's life (his 35th birthday) consisting of a series of comic and dramatic misadventures. Larry blames his life's problems on having struck out during a key moment of his state high school baseball championship game on his 15th birthday. When he wishes he had done things differently, his wish is granted by a guardian angel-like figure named Mike, who intermittently appears as a bartender, a cab driver, and so on. Larry soon discovers that Mike has transferred him into an alternative reality in which he had won the pivotal high school game. He finds himself still working for the company he had been originally, albeit successful and in a powerful position, and married to the boss's sexy daughter Cindy Jo Bumpers. At first, his new life seems perfect, but he soon begins to miss his best friend Clip Metzler, and his wife Ellen from his previous life; he also discovers that his alternative self has created many enemies, like Jewel Jagger who was a forklift operator and now she is his secretary and lover.

The story begins with Larry's car, an old Ford LTD station wagon, stalled out in a dark alley. Suddenly the pink lights of The Universal Joint, a bar, come on. Larry goes inside to call a tow truck and tells bartender Mike his troubles. He reviews the day he just had, which ended with his getting fired after discovering his department head Niles Pender's scheme to sell the company under the nose of its owners to a group of naive Japanese investors. He tells Mike that he wishes he had hit that last pitch out of the park, after which Mike fixes him a drink called "The Spilt Milk". The Spilt Milk was a drink that gave him his wish that he hit that home run in that championship game.

Larry leaves the bar, walks home (his car apparently towed), and discovers someone else living in his house, which is now fixed up (previously his yard and driveway were muddy and unfinished). Mike appears as a cab driver and drives him to his "new" home, a mansion in Forest Hills, explaining that he did in fact hit the last pitch and won the game. He soon discovers that Cindy Jo is his wife and he's the president of his company, Liberty Republic Sporting Goods. Being a classic car buff, he's shocked to find that he owns a collection of priceless antique automobiles.

Larry soon discovers that Clip has a low-level job in the accounting department and is quite insecure as opposed to the joker he previously was. Ellen is a shop steward (in both realities) and is married to another man. Jewel, a forklift operator in the previous reality, is now Larry's mistress and his secretary. Ellen hates Larry, and he discovers that the union is threatening a walkout due to massive layoffs and increased production since Niles is selling Liberty Republic in both realities. Seeing Ellen, he realizes how much he misses her and agrees to all the union's demands, provided Ellen agrees to dinner at his favorite restaurant. She reluctantly agrees, and Larry eventually convinces her that they were married in a previous life.

After discovering that Larry has agreed to union demands, Niles takes revenge by telling both Cindy Jo and Jewel of Larry's dinner date with Ellen. He then plots to kill Larry at the office that night. However, company owner Leo Hansen arrives to deliver a note to Larry, announcing his termination at Cindy Jo's request, and Niles kills him by mistake. Discovering the note, Niles calls the police, who attempt to arrest Larry for Leo's murder. Larry escapes while jealous Jewel creates pandemonium outside in her attempts to shoot him (and shoots out several police cars in the process), leading to a police chase. Larry is eventually cornered in a dark alley, but the pink glow of "The Universal Joint" comes on and he runs into the bar. Unable to find Mike, Larry attempts to make the "Spilt Milk" himself, the ingredients clearly aged.

What appears to be flashing police car lights appear and Larry surrenders. However, it is a tow truck driven by Duncan. Confused at first, Larry sees Mike back behind the bar and realizes he has been returned to his old life. Larry thanks Mike for everything and, upon exiting the bar, suddenly realizes that the deal with the Japanese investors is happening shortly. Driven by Duncan to company headquarters, Larry barges into the boardroom, decks Niles, and exposes his scheme just as Leo is about to sign the deal.

Thinking everyone forgot his birthday, Larry returns home (which still has the muddy driveway and lawn) to a surprise party with his family and friends. Soon after, Cindy Jo and her husband Jackie Earle, the company president, arrive. Jackie offers Niles' job to Larry, plus a company car which is a new Mercedes, and Larry accepts.

In the past, young Larry is about to leave the stadium, still upset about the loss, when he is greeted by a mysterious stranger in the stands (Mike) who reassures him that everything will be all right. Larry thanks him for the reassurance but walks off wondering who Mike thinks he is kidding.

== Deleted scenes ==
The film has at least two scenes that were removed from the final cut, both featuring Michael Caine; one in the garage at LJ's mansion and another where Caine's character appears to LJ when he escapes Ellen's dog while spying on her at her house. Portions from both scenes are included in the original theatrical trailer.

== Cast ==
- James Belushi as Lawrence Joseph "Larry"/"L.J." Burrows: The film's protagonist. A normal guy with an ordinary life who wishes it to be different, and is granted that wish and becomes president of the company with a big house.
- Linda Hamilton as Ellen Jane Burrows/Robertson: Larry's loving wife in the normal reality. She is the head of the labor union. In the alternate reality, she looks at Larry with much disdain as in the past he managed the company like a tyrant.
- Michael Caine as Mike the Bartender/Mr. Destiny: A bartender and guardian angel-like character responsible for showing Larry what his life would be like if events had been different.
- Jon Lovitz as Clip Metzler: Larry's lifelong best friend. He is shown to be a prankster, a goof-off, and a bit of a ladies' man. In the alternate reality, Clip is suffering from low self-esteem, is suicidal, and fears Larry because of how Larry changed as they became adults.
- Hart Bochner as Niles Pender: The film's antagonist. The head of Larry's department at work, who schemes and plots to take over the company.
- Bill McCutcheon as Leo Hansen: The owner of the company Larry works for, an old but very nice man. He is shown to be rather absent-minded at times.
- Rene Russo as Cindy Jo Bumpers/Burrows: Leo Hansen's attractive daughter. In the alternate reality, she is Larry's wife.
- Jay O. Sanders as Jackie Earle Bumpers, a.k.a. Cement Head: An ex-football player who is married to Cindy Jo and is president of the company Larry works for. He is neither seen nor mentioned in the alternate reality.
- Maury Chaykin as Guzelman: A contractor who is reluctant to finish paving Larry and Ellen's driveway.
- Pat Corley as Harry Burrows: Larry's father who works in the warehouse of the company Larry works for. In the normal reality, he is shown to be totally faithful to Larry's mother. In the alternate reality, it is mentioned that he is divorced from Larry's mother and dates younger women.
- Douglas Seale as Boswell: Larry's personal servant in the alternate reality.
- Courteney Cox as Jewel Jagger: The forklift operator in the normal reality. Is shown to have a dark side which becomes more evident in the alternate reality, in which Larry finds out he has been having an affair with her.
- Doug Barron as Lewis Flick: Accomplice to Niles Pender, though he is shown to not be quite as cold-hearted as Niles.
- Jeff Weiss as Ludwig: Larry's chauffeur in the alternate reality
- Jeff Pillars as Duncan: Tow Truck driver.
- Tony Longo as Huge Guy: Owns Larry's former house in the alternate reality.
- Kathy Ireland as Gina: Harry Burrows' girlfriend in the alternate reality.
- Sari Caine as girl: daughter of Larry Burrows in the alternate reality.
- Bryan Buffington as boy: son of Larry Burrows in the alternate reality.
- Rich Devaney as Larry Burrows: young Larry Burrows.
- Sky Berdahl as Clip Metzler: young Clip Metzler.
- Heather Lynch as Ellen Jane Burrows: young Ellen Jane Ripley.

== Filming ==
Portions of the film were filmed in Winston-Salem, North Carolina, using the baseball team from Richard J. Reynolds High School, and at the Biltmore Estate in Asheville, North Carolina. The office building is the former headquarters of the R. J. Reynolds Tobacco Company.

== Reception ==
On Rotten Tomatoes the film has an approval rating of 35% based on reviews from 17 critics.

Roger Ebert of the Chicago Sun-Times gave the film 2 out of 4 stars and wrote: "The movie is a slow march through foregone conclusions, and its curious passivity is underscored, if that is the word, by the quietest soundtrack I can remember."

Audiences polled by CinemaScore gave the film an average grade of "B+" on an A+ to F scale.

== See also ==
- List of baseball films
- List of films about angels
