= Top of the Heap (film) =

1972 film

- Film poster
- Directed by: Christopher St. John
- Written by: Christopher St. John
- Produced by: Christopher St. John
- Starring: Christopher St. John
- Cinematography: Richard A. Kelley
- Edited by: Michael Pozen
- Music by: J.J. Johnson
- Production companies: The Fanfare Corporation, St. John Unlimited Productions
- Release date: June 2, 1972 (New York)
- Running time: 94 minutes
- Country: United States
- Language: English

Top of the Heap is a 1972 American drama film directed, written and produced by, and starring, Christopher St. John.

== Plot ==
A Washington D.C. police officer, George Lattimer is proud to be one of few African Americans in the department, despite being disrespected by his peers. While working his daily beat, he drifts into a psychedelic fantasy in which he is a hip celebrity astronaut.

== Cast ==
- Christopher St. John as George Lattimer
- Paula Kelly as Black Chick
- Florence St. Peter as Viola Lattimer
- Leonard Kuras as Bobby Gelman
- John Alderson as Captain Walsh
- Patrick McVey as Tim Cassidy
- Allen Garfield as taxi driver
- Ingeborg Sørensen as Nurse Swenson (credited as Ingeborg Sorensen)
- Ron Douglas as hip passenger
- John McMurtry as dope dealer
- Damu King as pot peddler
- Ji-Tu Cumbuka as pot peddler
- Brian Cutler as rookie policeman
- Jerry Jones as club owner
- Willie Harris as bouncer

== Release ==
It was entered into the 22nd Berlin International Film Festival, but withdrawn from that year's Cannes Film Festival.
