= Bryan Buffington =

American actor (born 1980)

- Born: April 1, 1980 (age 45); Ridgewood, New Jersey, U.S.
- Occupation: Actor
- Years active: 1989–present
- Known for: Bill Lewis III on Guiding Light

Bryan Buffington (born April 1, 1980) is an American actor. He is best known for his role as Bill Lewis III on Guiding Light.

== Filmography ==
Year	Title	Role	Notes
1989–1998	Guiding Light	Bill Lewis III	Lead role
1990	Mr. Destiny	Boy	
1999	Party of Five	Pretty Boy Floyd	

== Awards and nominations ==
Daytime Emmy Awards

Year	Award	Work	Result	Ref
1990	Daytime Emmy Award for Outstanding Younger Actor in a Drama Series	Guiding Light	Nominated	
1991	Daytime Emmy Award for Outstanding Younger Actor in a Drama Series	Guiding Light	Nominated	
1993	Daytime Emmy Award for Outstanding Younger Actor in a Drama Series	Guiding Light	Nominated	
1994	Daytime Emmy Award for Outstanding Younger Actor in a Drama Series	Guiding Light	Nominated	
1995	Daytime Emmy Award for Outstanding Younger Actor in a Drama Series	Guiding Light	Nominated	

Young Artist Awards

Year	Award	Work	Result	Ref
1992	Young Artist Award for Best Young Actor in a Daytime Series	Guiding Light	Nominated	
1993	Young Artist Award for Best Young Actor in a Daytime Series	Guiding Light	Won	
1994	Young Artist Award for Best Youth Actor in a Soap Opera	Guiding Light	Nominated	
1995	Young Artist Award for Best Performance by a Youth Actor in a Daytime Series	Guiding Light	Nominated	
