= Timothy D. Stickney =

American actor

- Born: Timothy Duane Stickney; January 31, 1965 (age 61); Wilmington, Delaware, U.S.
- Education: American Academy of Dramatic Arts (AOS, 1985)
- Occupation: Actor
- Years active: 1990–present
- Spouse: Laura L. Priestly
- Relatives: Phyllis Yvonne Stickney (sister)

Timothy Duane Stickney (born January 31, 1965) is an American actor, director, and theater practitioner.

Stickney is most recognized for his role as bad guy Randall James "R.J." Gannon on the ABC soap opera, One Life to Live, a role originated in 1994. In 2006, his role as R.J. was bumped down from contract to recurring. He starred in many musicals at Dickinson High School before moving to New York City to attend the American Academy of Dramatic Arts. In 2007, Timothy appeared as Oswald in the Public Theater's production of King Lear and also as Prince Escalus in their "Shakespeare in the Park" production of Romeo and Juliet at the Delacorte Theater in Central Park. Stickney was a member of the Stratford Shakespeare Festival for four seasons. Most recently, Stickney appeared as Macbeth in the Repertory Theater of St Louis' 2011 main stage production.

He directed Shakespeare's classic tragedy King Lear and The Pecong for Take Wing and Soar Productions at the National Black Theater in New York City.

== Filmography ==
Year	Title	Role	Notes
1990	Where the Heart Is	Marcus	
1990	King of New York	Cop	Uncredited
1990	The Return of Superfly	Rasta Cab Driver	
1990	Green Card		Uncredited
1991	The Marla Hanson Story	Steve Bowman	TV movie
1991	The Super		Uncredited
1992	Light Sleeper	Young Dominican	
1992	Indecency	Albert	TV movie
1992	Maintenance	Floyd	
1993	Barbarians at the Gate	Taxi Driver	TV movie
1993	Three of Hearts	Ralph	
1993	Blood Brothers		
1997	White Lies	Bartender at Hoarder's Party	
1994-2009	One Life to Live	Randall James / R.J. Gannon	
1997	Cop Land	Window Yeller	
1997	Office Killer	Paramedic #1	
1999	Coming Soon	Suave Man	
2006	Undone		
2009	Caesar and Cleopatra	Pothinus	
2010	The Tempest	Sebastian	
2015	Good Friday	Leland Hardt	
