= Scott DeFreitas =

American actor (born 1969)

- Born: Scott James DeFreitas; September 9, 1969 (age 56); Newton, Massachusetts, U.S.
- Education: King School
- Occupation: Actor
- Years active: 1985-2000
- Known for: Andy Dixon on As the World Turns
- Spouse: Maura West (m. 2000)
- Children: 4

Scott James DeFreitas (born September 9, 1969) is an American television actor. He is best known for playing the role of Andrew "Andy" Dixon on the CBS soap opera As the World Turns (1985 to 1995, 1997 to 2000). He received three Daytime Emmy Award nominations for his role on As the World Turns.

== Early life ==
DeFreitas was born in Newton, Massachusetts and spent his early years in Hudson before his family settled in Darien, Connecticut. His father was a computer salesman and his mother was a teacher who worked as a banquet waitress after her children were born. He has three younger brothers. He attended King School in Stamford, Connecticut. He decided not to attend college because he was offered a contract with As the World Turns. His parents were divorcing when he moved to New York.

== Career ==
He became interested in acting at age fourteen when a neighbor, who happened to be a casting director, urged him to audition for commercials.

DeFreitas was cast in an Off-Broadway play, Coming of Age in SoHo, playing the role of Dy, a teen runaway. The play, written and directed by Albert Innaurato, opened in February 1985 at the Public Theater.

After auditioning for a character named Matt on As the World Turns, he instead landed the role of Andy Dixon. He won critical acclaim and award recognition for the storyline of Andy's alcoholism. DeFreitas received Daytime Emmy Award nominations for Outstanding Younger Actor in 1988, 1992, and 1994. He played the role of Andy from 1985 to 1995, then from 1997 to 2000.

== Personal life ==
DeFreitas has said that he fell in love with his ATWT co-star Maura West when they danced together at an industry function on October 16, 1998. He proposed marriage to her on the scoreboard at Yankee Stadium. They have been married since January 22, 2000. The couple has four children, as well as a son from West's previous marriage. One of their children is on the autism spectrum.

DeFreitas and West agreed to have the birth of their first child filmed for an episode of the TLC series A Baby Story.

DeFreitas and West are the parents of actor Joe West.

== Awards and nominations ==
| Year | Award | Category | Title | Result | Ref. |
|---|---|---|---|---|---|
| 1988 | Daytime Emmy Award | Outstanding Younger Actor in a Drama Series | As the World Turns | Nominated | |
| 1992 | Daytime Emmy Award | Outstanding Younger Actor in a Drama Series | As the World Turns | Nominated | |
| 1994 | Daytime Emmy Award | Outstanding Younger Actor in a Drama Series | As the World Turns | Nominated | |
