= 16th Daytime Emmy Awards =

- Date: June 29, 1989 (Ceremony); June 25, 1989 (Creative Arts Awards)
- Location: Waldorf-Astoria Hotel
- Presented by: National Academy of Television Arts and Sciences

Highlights
- Outstanding Drama Series: Santa Barbara
- Outstanding Game Show: The $25,000 Pyramid

Television/radio coverage
- Network: NBC

The 16th Daytime Emmy Awards were held on Thursday, June 29, 1989, on NBC to commemorate excellence in daytime programming between March 6, 1988 and March 5, 1989. The awards aired from 3-5 p.m. EST, preempting Santa Barbara. Again this year, the awards ceremony was a joint presentation of the National Academy of Television Arts and Sciences (NATAS) on the East Coast and the Academy of Television Arts and Sciences (ATAS) on the West Coast. The ceremonies and live telecast was held at the Waldorf-Astoria Hotel in New York City. The non-televised Daytime Emmy Awards presentation for programs and individual achievement, primarily for excellence in creative arts categories, was held four days earlier on June 25. The ceremony did not have a formal host, but was announced by Don Pardo.

Winners in each category are in bold. Two winners were recorded in the Outstanding Supporting Actress in a Daytime Drama Series category, as a tie was recorded in the race between actresses Debbi Morgan and Nancy Lee Grahn.

== Outstanding Daytime Drama Series ==
- All My Children
- As the World Turns
- General Hospital
- Guiding Light
- **Santa Barbara**
- The Young and the Restless

== Outstanding Actor in a Daytime Drama Series ==
- **David Canary** (**Adam Chandler and Stuart Chandler**, All My Children)
- James Mitchell (Palmer Cortlandt, All My Children)
- Douglass Watson (Mac Cory, Another World)
- Larry Bryggman (Dr. John Dixon, As the World Turns)
- A Martinez (Cruz Castillo, Santa Barbara)

== Outstanding Actress in a Daytime Drama Series ==
- Susan Lucci (Erica Kane, All My Children)
- Elizabeth Hubbard (Lucinda Walsh, As the World Turns)
- **Marcy Walker** (**Eden Capwell**, Santa Barbara)
- Jeanne Cooper (Katherine Chancellor, The Young and the Restless)

== Outstanding Supporting Actor in a Daytime Drama Series ==
- David Forsyth (Dr. John Hudson, Another World)
- Joseph Campanella (Harper Deveraux, Days of Our Lives)
- **Justin Deas** (**Keith Timmons**, Santa Barbara)
- Quinn Redeker (Brian Romalotti, The Young and the Restless)

== Outstanding Supporting Actress in a Daytime Drama Series ==
- **Debbi Morgan** (**Angie Hubbard**, All My Children)
- **Nancy Lee Grahn** (**Julia Wainwright**, Santa Barbara)
- Jane Elliot (Anjelica Deveraux, Days of Our Lives)
- Arleen Sorkin (Calliope Jones, Days of Our Lives)
- Robin Mattson (Gina Blake, Santa Barbara)

== Outstanding Young Man in a Daytime Drama Series ==
- Andrew Kavovit (Paul Ryan, As the World Turns)
- Darrell Utley (Benjy Hawk, Days of Our Lives)
- **Justin Gocke (Brandon Capwell, Santa Barbara**)

== Outstanding Ingenue in a Daytime Drama Series ==
- Anne Heche (Marley Hudson and Vicky Hudson, Another World)
- Martha Byrne (Lily Walsh, As the World Turns)
- **Kimberly McCullough** (Robin Scorpio, General Hospital)
- Noelle Beck (Patricia Alden, Loving)

== Outstanding Daytime Drama Series Writing ==
- Another World
- **Santa Barbara**
- As the World Turns
- Guiding Light

== Outstanding Daytime Drama Series Directing ==
- As the World Turns
- **The Young and the Restless**
- Family Medical Center
- Loving
- One Life to Live

== Outstanding Game Show ==
- **The $25,000 Pyramid** - A Bob Stewart-Sande Stewart Production for CBS (Syn. by 20th Century Fox Television)
- Jeopardy! - A production of Merv Griffin Enterprises (Syn. by King World)
- The Price Is Right - A Mark Goodson Production for CBS
- Wheel of Fortune - A production of Merv Griffin Enterprises for NBC (Syn. by King World)
- Win, Lose or Draw - A Kilne & Friends Production for NBC (Syn. by Buena Vista Television)

== Outstanding Game Show Host/Hostess ==
- **Alex Trebek** (Jeopardy!)
- Dick Clark (The $25,000 Pyramid)
- Pat Sajak (Wheel of Fortune)
- Vicki Lawrence Schultz (Win, Lose or Draw)

== Outstanding Animated Program ==
- **Karl Geurs, Mark Zaslove, Bruce Talkington and Carter Crocker (The New Adventures of Winnie the Pooh)**
- William Hanna, Joseph Barbera, Tom Ruegger, Ray Patterson, Oscar Dufau, Paul Sommer, Don Lusk, Arthur Davis, Bob Goe, Lane Raichert, Bill Matheny and Laren Bright (A Pup Named Scooby-Doo)
- Bob Hathcock, Jymn Magon, Bruce Talkington and Len Uhley (DuckTales)
- Margaret Loesch, Jim Henson, Bob Richardson, John Ahern, Karen Peterson, Rudy Cataldi, Al Kouzel, Chuck Downs, Hank Saroyan, Sindy McKay and Larry Swerdlove (Muppet Babies)
- William Hanna, Joseph Barbera, Paul Sabella, Ray Patterson, Don Lusk, Paul Sommer, Bob Goe, Carl Urbano, Glenn Leopold, Sean Catherine Derek, Kevin Hopps, Bill Matheny, Reed Robbins and Ernie Contreras (The Smurfs)

== Outstanding Film Sound Mixing ==
- **Jeffrey J. Haboush and Greg P. Russell (Muppet Babies)**

== Outstanding Film Sound Editing (Tie) ==
- **Al Breitenbach, Ron Fedele, Richard C. Allen, Steven D. Williams and Kenneth R. Burton (Muppet Babies)**
- **Steve Kirklys, Steve Michael, Peter Cole, Ken Dahlinger, Greg Teall and John Walker (Pee-wee's Playhouse: To Tell The Tooth)**
