= Joe Perkins (Santa Barbara) =

- Santa Barbara character
- Dane Witherspoon as Joe Perkins (1984)
- Portrayed by: Dane Witherspoon (1984); Mark Arnold (1984–1985)
- First appearance: Episode 1 July 30, 1984
- Last appearance: Episode 152; March 1, 1985
- Created by: Bridget and Jerome Dobson
In-universe information
- Occupation: Handyman
- Father: John Perkins
- Mother: Marisa Perkins
- Sisters: Amy Wallace; Jade Perkins
- Wife: Kelly Capwell (1985)
- Nephews: Johnny Wallace

Joseph Evan "Joe" Perkins is a fictional character from the American soap opera Santa Barbara. Actor Dane Witherspoon originated the role in the first episode of the series aired on July 30, 1984. Following a disagreement with the show's producers, Witherspoon was fired and last seen on the show on October 30, 1984, when Joe was supposed to be killed, but the storyline was changed in order to recast the character.

Mark Arnold took over the role on October 31, 1984 and played it until March 1, 1985, when Joe was killed off. Arnold himself chose not to renew his contract after only a few months, because he wanted to do something different with his career. Following the death of the character, the entire Perkins family was removed from the show not long after that.

== Development ==
Actor Dane Witherspoon originated the role of Joe. He revealed that he ended up reading for three roles, but he really wanted the part of Joe. Of his casting, Witherspoon said "I was told they chose me because they sensed an intense, searching quality underneath my outward calm. That quality is in me; it always has been." Witherspoon admitted that he was exhausted by the filming schedule, in which he worked 16 hours a day, almost every day.

The serial opens with Joe's release from prison, and it is established that he was accused of murdering a member of the Capwell family five years prior. He returns home to find the real culprit and clear his name. Joe is the son of an oil-rigger, and his family are "distinctly working class", which contrasts with the aristocratic and upper class Capwells. Joe's former girlfriend, Kelly Capwell (Robin Wright) is the sister of the man he was convicted of killing.

After three months in the role, Witherspoon was let go from Santa Barbara and the role was recast to Mark Arnold. The initial reason given was that he was not right for the lead role. The Courier-Post's Lynda Hirsch reported that his co-stars were unhappy by the development and thought he should have been given more time to establish himself in the role. The show was also going through a period of low ratings and new producers had been brought in, leading to cast changes. Jon-Michael Reed of the Philadelphia Daily News later reported that Witherspoon's portrayal of Joe had not been living up to the writers' expectations.

In March 1985, a few months after Arnold took over the role, the character was written out of the show. On-screen, Joe and his fiancée Kelly Capwell marry amidst the Carnation Killer storyline, which has seen a serial killer targeting women who look like Kelly. Wendy Chapman of TV Week wrote that the couple "were never to find the happiness they deserved." Their wedding night is interrupted by the killer, who kidnaps Kelly and is revealed to be her former fiancé Peter Flint (Stephen Meadows). After Kelly is saved, Peter shoots Joe, who later dies of his injuries.

== Storylines ==
After serving five years in prison for the murder of Channing Capwell, Jr., which he did not commit, Joe Perkins returns to Santa Barbara to rejoin his family and try to win back his former fiancée, Kelly Capwell. Kelly had testified against Joe at his murder trial and her testimony put Joe in jail. However, Joe is ready to forgive her, knowing that she was under the influence of her brother Mason Capwell (Lane Davies). Joe is not welcomed by his father John Perkins (Robert Alan Browne), who had always believed that Joe was guilty. Needing money, Joe takes a job as the gardener at the Lockridge mansion and has an affair with Augusta Lockridge (Louise Sorel).

Joe desperately tries to convince Kelly that he did not kill Channing and she believes him eventually. Kelly's fiancé Peter Flint is jealous of their friendship and decides to do whatever he can to get rid of Joe, even going so far as planting drugs on his bike. Joe decides to hide from the authorities and ends up getting lost at sea and is presumed dead. He makes it back to Santa Barbara, but continues to hide out. He is approached by a man named Dominic (Rosemary Forsyth; Judith McConnell) who helps him to prove that he did not kill Channing. Joe suspects Dominic might be a woman, but he does not say anything.

John realizes that Joe did not kill Channing, and Joe gladly announces that he is alive. He is arrested by the police, but manages to escape when an earthquake hits Santa Barbara. Joe's father dies in the earthquake, and Dominic reveals that she is actually Sophia Capwell, Kelly's mother who was presumed dead. Peter continues to plot against Joe. The two fight in the woods and Joe shoots Peter. Peter ends up in a hospital, where he finally admits that Joe did not kill Channing.

Joe is finally proven to be innocent and he happily reunites with Kelly. The two decide to get married. Peter loses his mind and starts killing girls who look like Kelly. Joe and Kelly marry, but their happiness soon ends when Peter takes Joe and other people hostage. Peter shoots Joe, causing him to fall through a window. He later dies in the hospital.

== Reception ==
John N. Goudas of The Miami News believed the younger characters should be credited with the show's success and singled out Joe in particular. Goudas wrote: "At the outset, Joe Perkins carries the soaper, the sneered-upon hero, the good guy who must prove himself. If Joe brings yawns, Santa Barbara sinks." The character appeared in every episode following his debut, leading Connie Passalacqua of The News Leader to call him "the most overworked character on daytime television."

On Witherspoon's departure from the soap, Jon-Michael Reed of the Philadelphia Daily News believed that the actor's intensity overwhelmed to the point that there was "no room for levity or humor" in his performance. Reed noted that Witherspoon had become a "heartthrob" during his time on the show, and stated "it's a skittish or foolish producer who chooses to rock the fan boat so soon in SB's three-month history." He also observed that the relationship between Joe and Kelly had become popular with viewers and was "the one solid asset that SB could boast." Due to Joe and Kelly's history, Wendy Chapman of TV Week dubbed them "star-crossed lovers".
