= Michael Brainard =

American actor (born 1965)

- Born: November 23, 1965 (age 60); Hollywood, Los Angeles, California, U.S.
- Occupation: Actor
- Years active: 1988–present

Michael Scott Brainard (born November 23, 1965) is an American actor. He is best known for playing the roles of Joey "Jake" Martin on the ABC soap opera All My Children (1988 to 1991, 1994 and 1995) and Ted Capwell on the NBC soap opera Santa Barbara (1991 to 1993).

== Early life ==
Brainard was born in Hollywood, Los Angeles, California and raised in Laguna Hills. His father was a Los Angeles firefighter and his mother was an accountant. He has one sibling, an older sister. After graduating from Laguna Hills High School, Brainard attended California State University, Fullerton. He studied acting at Pacific Christian College, the School of Performing Arts in Costa Mesa, and the Lee Strasberg Theatre and Film Institute in Los Angeles. During his college years, he performed in productions of Mister Roberts, Fiddler on the Roof, Front Page, Flowers for Algernon, and One Flew Over the Cuckoo's Nest.

Prior to beginning his role on All My Children, he worked at Bennigan's in Costa Mesa. He also had a temporary job unloading furniture for Levitt's furniture store.

== Career ==
Brainard made his television debut on an episode of Divorce Court. He auditioned for the role of David Rampal on All My Children (which went to Trent Bushey), but instead landed the role of Joey Martin (later renamed Jake Martin). Brainard first appeared on screen in the Thanksgiving episode in 1988, then returned in 1989. He relocated from California to New York, where the show was filmed. He didn't enjoy living in New York or the writer's characterization of Joey. He stayed with the show until his contract ended in 1991. He received a Soap Opera Digest Award nomination for Outstanding Younger Leading Actor for his role on All My Children in 1991.

In October 1991, he joined the cast of Santa Barbara as Ted Capwell. The role had previously been played by Todd McKee. Brainard played the role until the show's final episodes aired in January 1993. He appeared as himself on Circus of the Stars in 1992.

After the cancellation of Santa Barbara, he made return appearances to All My Children in 1994 and 1995. Brainard guest starred on Silk Stalkings in 1994 and Family Law in 2000. He had roles in the films Toi and Poochie and Invincible.

On stage, Brainard has appeared as a guest artist at Culver-Stockton College. He starred as Valmont in a 2002 production of Les Liaisons Dangereuses. He returned in 2005 to star in Neil Simon's Brighton Beach Memoirs. Brainard has also written and directed two plays, A Murder of Crows and Lookin' for Some Posse.

In 2007, Brainard returned to television, starring as Alex Koris on the MyNetworkTV series American Heiress. He played Rick in the 2008 horror film Killing Ariel and also appeared in The Onion Movie. In 2011, Brainard had a role in Gregori J. Martin's film Sebastian. In 2015, he co-starred with his former Santa Barbara castmate Robert Fontaine in Mi America, a drama about a hate crime.

From 2020 to 2021, Brainard played Coach on the web series Duke and Dammit. In 2020, he wrote and co-produced the 13-part audio series The Ernie Pyle Experiment! for WFIU radio. The series celebrates the life of journalist Ernie Pyle.

== Personal life ==
Brainard has a side career as a woodworker. In 2007, one of his pieces was featured on the cover of the Los Angeles Times calendar section, in a photo of actress Kate Walsh.

== Filmography ==
=== Film ===
Year	Title	Role	Notes
2004	Toi and Poochie	Barry	
2004	Bad Man	Sheriff Paul Rall	Short film Also producer
2005	Lookin' for Some Posse	Cowboy No.3	Short film Also producer and writer
2006	Invincible	Eagles Coach No.4	Credited as Michael S. Brainard
2008	Killing Ariel	Rick	
2008	The Onion Movie	White Black Guy Policeman	Credited as Mike Brainard
2011	Sebastian	Patrolman	
2015	Mi America	Tom Anderson	

=== Television ===
Year	Title	Role	Notes
1988–1991; 1994; 1995	All My Children	Joey Martin	Contract role; Guest appearances
1991–1993	Santa Barbara	Ted Capwell	Contract role 172 episodes
1992	Circus of the Stars and Sideshow	Himself	Television special
1994	Silk Stalkings	Parker Jones	Episode: "Killer Cops"
2000	Family Law	Dr. Greene	Episode: "Necessity"
2007	American Heiress	Alex Koris	18 episodes

=== Web series ===
Year	Title	Role	Notes
2020–2021	Duke and Dammit	Coach	7 episodes
2021	Public Health	Stewart	
