= List of Santa Barbara characters =

Cast circa 1984 Rosa Andrade, Mason Capwell, Ruben Andrade, Santana Andrade, Cruz Castillo, Brick Wallace, Joe Perkins, Kelly Capwell, Peter Flint, C.C. Capwell, Lionel Lockridge, Augusta Lockridge, Veronica Gayley, Marisa Perkins, Minx Lockridge, Brandon DeMott, Gina DeMott, John Perkins, Eden Capwell, Ted Capwell, Laken Lockridge, Jade Perkins, Danny Andrade, Warren Lockridge, Summer Blake, Amy Perkins

Santa Barbara is an American television soap opera that aired on NBC from July 30, 1984, to January 15, 1993. The show initially revolved around the lives of four families; the wealthy Capwell family, rivals the Lockridge family, and the more modest Andrade and Perkins families.

== Main characters ==
- Nikki Alvarez – Constance Marie
- Santana Andrade – Ava Lazar / Margaret Michaels / Gina Gallego / Wanda De Jesus
- Quinn Armitage – Roscoe Born
- Laura Simmons Asher – Christopher Norris
- Robert Barr – Roscoe Born
- Flame Beaufort – Roberta Weiss
- C.C. (Channing Creighton) Capwell – Peter Mark Richman / Paul Burke / Charles Bateman / Jed Allan
- Eden Capwell – Marcy Walker
- Julia Wainwright Capwell – Nancy Lee Grahn
- Kelly Capwell – Robin Wright / Carrington Garland / Eileen Davidson
- Lily Blake Capwell – Lynn Clark / Paula Irvine
- Mason Capwell – Lane Davies / Terry Lester / Gordon Thomson
- Sophia Wayne Capwell – Rosemary Forsyth / Judith McConnell
- Ted Capwell – Todd McKee / Michael Brainard
- Cruz Castillo – A Martinez
- Scott Clark – Vincent Irizarry
- Suzanne Collier – Terri Garber
- Pamela Capwell Conrad – Shirley Anne Field / Marj Dusay
- Michael Donnelly – Frank Runyeon
- Peter Flint – Stephen Meadows
- Victoria Lane – Kristen Meadows
- Augusta Wainwright Lockridge – Louise Sorel
- Gina Blake DeMott Capwell Timmons Lockridge – Linda Gibboney / Robin Mattson
- Laken Lockridge – Julie Ronnie / Susan Marie Snyder / Shell Danielson
- Lionel Lockridge – Nicolas Coster
- Warren Lockridge – John Allen Nelson / Scott Jenkins / Jack Wagner
- Mark McCormick – Jon Lindstrom
- Joe Perkins – Dane Witherspoon / Mark Arnold
- Angela Raymond – Nina Arvesen
- B.J. Walker – Sydney Penny

== A ==
=== Danny Andrade ===
Rupert Ravens (July 30, 1984 – November 28, 1986)

Danny, Santana's younger brother, was part of the very first teen set on the show. Danny and his friends sought fame in Hollywood and even opened a hotel. He was involved with Jade Perkins, but their relationship was eventually phased out. By 1985 Danny was almost forgotten. He returned briefly on a couple occasions (as Danny was revealed to have gotten into trouble thanks to drugs) only to exit the show permanently in 1986.

=== Rosa and Ruben Andrade ===
Margarita Cordova (July 30, 1984 – August 25, 1987, February 21, 1991 – January 15, 1993)
Ismael 'East' Carlo (August 3, 1984 – February 6, 1985)

The Andrade family had a prominent role in the early months of the show, but their significance waned quickly. Rosa, a maid to the wealthy Capwell family, was always there for the Capwell kids as a surrogate mother, their real mother (Sophia) presumed to be dead. Ruben worked at the Capwell mansion as well as a gardener; he did not have much of a role during his short stay on the show. They had four children: daughters Gabriela, Olivia, Santana, and son Danny. Ruben's last appearance on-screen was in 1985; Rosa continued to mention Ruben, apparently still working on the Capwell grounds, until she stopped appearing as well, in 1987, having remained around as long as daughter Santana was involved in the storyline. Rosa finally reappeared in 1991 (as did Santana), as a love interest for Rafael Castillo; Ruben was not mentioned at that time other than her brief explanation that he had abandoned her.

=== Marcello Armonti ===
Wolf Muser (January 7, 1985 – June 4, 1985)

Marcello Armonti followed his stepmother, Countess Armonti (aka Dominick, actually Sophia Wayne Capwell), to Santa Barbara in 1985. Marcello was a psychiatrist who had treated Sophia. He also helped Kelly to grieve for her husband Joe, who had been murdered by Peter Flint.

Not much was known about Marcello's past at first, but it was obvious he had an ulterior motive. He was actually seeking revenge against C.C. Capwell for the murder of his parents. (Of course, the truth was very different from Marcello's belief.) His plans were ruined by his sympathy for Kelly, whom he nearly killed during his attempt on C.C.'s life. Marcello stuck around in town until it was revealed that Sophia was Channing's (inadvertent) murderer. He was later imprisoned for killing Hank Judson.

=== Ethan Asher ===
Leigh McCloskey (March 7, 1989 – July 18, 1990)

Ethan Asher was Santa Barbara's District Attorney following Keith Timmons's departure; he was later revealed to be one of the Four Orphans scarred by Cassie Benedict's apparent death. When he arrived in Santa Barbara, he brought his mentally disturbed wife Laura with him. Laura cheated on Ethan with her former lover Michael Donnelly, which prompted Ethan to seek comfort in the arms of Laura's girlhood friend, Gina.

A jealous Laura ran over Ethan. He ended up in a hospital, where he found a possible link to the death of Cassie Benedict. Ethan continued researching the case and did not stop at anything—he was eventually incarcerated for going too far in his pursuit of Cassie's supposed killers.

== B ==
=== Andrea Bedford ===
Ally Walker (January 7, 1988 – October 31, 1988)

Andrea made her first appearance in town followed the oil rig explosion—she was involved in the animal rescue effort. Cain Garver, an investigator in Cruz Castillo's agency, suspected that Andrea might be a criminal named Fox. It was later revealed that Andrea was actually a secret agent also investigating the mysterious Fox, who had killed her father. Andrea's mission was complete when she learned that "Fox" was actually a nurse, Kathleen McDougall.

She decided to stay in Santa Barbara, and she started a relationship with Cain. Major Phillip Hamilton asked for Andrea's assistance in reuniting Vietnamese families. Hamilton was actually Cain's former commanding officer and wanted revenge against Cain. He hired an actress named Ming Li to pose as Cain's daughter, in order to drive a wedge between Andrea and Cain. Phillip tried to seduce Andrea, but later realized that she only loved Cain. Cain started acting weird, so Andrea left town for a little time. When she returned, she realized that things had not changed. One day, Andrea was found raped and murdered on the beach. The prime suspects were Phillip and Cain, but it was later revealed that it was in fact Dr. Zach Kelton.

=== Cassandra Benedict ===
Karen Moncrieff (June 20, 1990 – April 9, 1992)

Cassandra Benedict was a foster child of the Capwells, believed to have been killed in a cave-in in the tunnel between the Capwell and Lockridge estates—an accident witnessed by four orphan boys who had been Cassie's friends. The boys made a pact to avenge her death. Years later, in 1990, they arrived in Santa Barbara as grown men – Ethan Asher, Stephen Slade, Craig Hunt and Derek Griffin, still haunted by the childhood tragedy. Derek in particular was obsessed with revenge—he blamed Mason, who had tormented his foster sister. Just as Derek was preparing to execute Mason, Cassandra revealed herself to be alive. Cassie was welcomed back into the Capwell fold and made an honorary member of the family, quickly establishing herself as a force with which to be reckoned. Cassie managed to break up Mason's relationship with Julia.

Her life was turned upside down when she discovered her long-lost mother was actually town matriarch Minx Lockridge. Minx sought her illegitimate daughter's forgiveness for abandoning her. Embarrassed and hurt, Cassie rejected Minx and kept her origins a secret to protect her place in the Capwell family. Eventually, Mason's mother, Pamela, revealed the secret, out of spite. C.C. still accepted her as his child. Cassie's relationship with the Lockridges remained strained, especially with the return of her nephew, Lionel's son Warren. Years before, offscreen, Cassie and Warren had had a love affair in Singapore.

Mason and Cassie became engaged while Cassie and Warren fought their attraction. Warren was blamed when Mason was shot. Augusta later revealed the truth: that Warren was not Lionel's biological son. This should have paved the way for a Cassie-Warren reunion. It was too late, however, since Warren was now in love with Angela Cassidy. Obsessed with Warren, Cassie tried to destroy Angela by uncovering Angela's role in her sister Marilyn's mysterious death. When she tried to poison Angela, Lionel was the unintended victim. Heart-broken, Minx shipped her unbalanced daughter off to a mental hospital.

=== Hayley Benson ===
Stacy Edwards (February 7, 1986 – January 12, 1988)

Hayley Benson arrived in Santa Barbara in 1986 after running away from her parents. She came to live with her aunt, Gina. Hayley soon won the sympathy of Ted Capwell, who gave her a job at the Capwell mansion. As time passed, Hayley got involved in a group that protested the casino in town. During one of their activities, Hayley threw a projectile that ended up exploding and killing Amy Perkins Wallace. Ted married Hayley so he would not have to testify against her.

Things got more complicated when Ted's ex-girlfriend Laken Lockridge returned to town. At the same time, Hayley was raped by an unknown attacker. She sought comfort in Ted, who could not be around her anymore. Hayley then ended up with Jake Morton. They started a relationship and Ted eventually divorced Hayley so the happy couple could enjoy their lives. Unfortunately, early in 1988, Hayley was run over by Carmen Castillo's drunk boyfriend.

=== Mack Blake ===
Steve Bond (September 4, 1989 – September 21, 1990)

Mack Blake, Gina's brother, came to town in 1989: somewhat of a surprise, as Gina had never mentioned a brother. Trouble tended to follow Mack during his brief stay in Santa Barbara: upon arrival, he was immediately accused of stealing a Porsche from his former lover, Yvonne Bartelo. Later, Ilsa, a colleague at the Capwell fitness center (where Mack was a trainer), accused him of stealing jewels. In both cases, Mack proved his innocence. Finally, another lover of Mack's, Gretchen Richards, attempted to talk him into murdering her wealthy husband, Harland. When Mack refused, Gretchen accused him anyway. After he was exonerated, Mack left town.

Gina was suspicious of Mack throughout his stay in Santa Barbara and believed him to be a bad influence on Brandon. However, the truth was that Mack spent a lot of time with Brandon, giving him pointers in life and acting as a role model.

Like Gina, Mack was a close friend to Laura Asher; he was surprised to find out that his sister Gina was having an affair with Laura's husband Ethan.

=== Phyllis Blake ===
??? (? – ?)
Stella Stevens (November 27, 1989 – December 27, 1990)

The mother of Gina DeMott made her first appearance in a flashback of Gina when she remembered the birth of her daughter Lily whom her mother declared dead.
The first appearance in town was at the end of 1989, when she joined her daughter at the Lockridge mansion, hoping that Gina had forgiven her their shared past. Phyllis immediately decided to take control of Gina's life. After learning of Gina's affair with Ethan Asher, Phyllis managed to get hired as Ethan's secretary in order to investigate Ethan's wife Laura. She learned that Laura had committed a murder and blackmailed her, until Gina convinced her to stop. Phyllis's gambling became a problem as well, as it led Phyllis to neglect to pay Gina's insurance premium: when the Lockridge mansion burned down, the two women became homeless. Gina then started pretending to be blind, and Phyllis helped her smuggle paintings out of the Capwell mansion, until they were both stopped by C.C. Capwell. Phyllis left town shortly thereafter, having come to the conclusion that she brought nothing but trouble to her daughter.

=== Summer Blake ===
Jonna Leigh Stack (September 27, 1984 – January 14, 1985)

Summer first appeared in town shortly after her sister Gina's arrival. They moved in together; Summer moved to her own apartment weeks later and started working at the city art museum as a curator. Summer's burgeoning relationship with Warren Lockridge took a big hit when Warren tried to get physical and she seemed to have been distancing herself from him. Summer left to get therapy in L.A.; Warren learned from Gina that Summer had been raped by her former lover, Hank Judson. Upon her return to town, Summer was relieved when Warren offered understanding and comfort; in return, she offered him help in many troubled moments he had with the law. While being interviewed at the police station by Mason regarding Warren and the stolen Capwell gold coins Summer accidentally viewed a photograph of the murdered Barbara Anderson, the first victim of the Carnation Killer. Hours later Summer tragically became the second victim: At the State Street Bistro Peter Flint convinced her to leave and get in a car with him by telling her that Warren had been hospitalized and later raped and murdered her. Warren was the person who discovered her body lying in an abandoned warehouse not long after her murder. She had been raped and strangled and was holding a white carnation flower in one hand. Warren broke the tragic news of her murder to her elder sister Gina.

=== Pearl Bradford ===
Robert Thaler (October 31, 1985 – April 22, 1988)

Pearl was introduced as a wacky oddball waiter at Buzz's Place who occasionally helped Cruz Castillo in his investigations. In 1986, Pearl met Courtney Capwell in the course of a scavenger hunt and the two fell in love. He eventually revealed to her that he was actually Michael Baldwin Bradford III, the son of a wealthy Boston family and a brilliant scholar. He had turned his back on his family and developed a new identity out of devastation when his brother Brian killed himself after their parents had institutionalized him for embarrassing the family name. When Pearl heard that the same corrupt Dr. Rawlings who had run the institution where Brian had died was now treating Kelly Capwell after she was locked up for going insane from killing Dylan Hartley in self-defense, he posed as a patient and had himself committed in order to investigate the matter undercover. In the process, he fell in love with Kelly (to Courtney's chagrin) and helped her escape the institution; the Capwells sent Kelly off to stay with family friends in Switzerland until they could convince Gina to hand over the videotape proving that she had killed Dylan in self-defense. Pearl and Courtney eventually discovered that Dr. Rawlings was practicing medicine without a doctor's degree and he was jailed after he tried to kill them; in the process, they discovered that Brian was actually alive. They eventually tracked down Brian, who at first was angry with Pearl due to a misheard conversation between his parents and Pearl; he had thought Pearl hated him when in fact Pearl was sticking up for Brian. They reconciled and Brian eventually figured out that Courtney had killed her sister Madeline; Courtney revealed that it was in self-defense and fled town, and Brian left town shortly thereafter.

In early 1987, Pearl was supposed to go to Switzerland to secretly bring Kelly back home, but a tail from Gina and Keith's PI forced a last-minute change of plans and Jeffrey Conrad went in Pearl's place. When Kelly and Jeffrey eventually returned to Santa Barbara, Pearl was devastated to find out they had fallen in love. Aside from helping Cruz open a detective agency, Pearl had no more major storylines of his own and eventually disappeared from the canvas without an explanation in April 1988.

== C ==
=== Brandon DeMott Capwell ===
Brandon Capwell
- Santa Barbara character
- Portrayed by: Scott Curtis September 20, 1984–August 16, 1985; Brandon Call (August 19, 1985–June 11, 1987); David Zebulon (October 29–November 4, 1985); Brian Autenrieth (December 19, 1985–January 6, 1986); Will Nipper (1987) temporary replacement; Justin Gocke (August 1987–December 1992)
In-universe information
- Father: Channing Capwell Jr
- Mother: Santana Andrade
- Adoptive father: C.C. Capwell
- Adoptive mother: Gina DeMott
- Brothers: Channing Capwell III(adoptive)
- Half-brothers: Ted Capwell(adoptive); Mason Capwell(adoptive); Greg Hughes(adoptive)
- Half-sisters: Kelly Capwell(adoptive); Eden Capwell(adoptive); Elena Nikolas(adoptive); Lily Blake(adoptive)

Brandon came to Santa Barbara in late 1984 with his presumed-mother Gina DeMott. Santana Andrade learned that Brandon was her son (with Channing) and set out to get Brandon away from Gina. C.C. sided with Gina, whom he allowed to stay at the Capwell mansion. Santana continued fighting for custody, winning in 1986. Brandon was briefly raised by Santana and her husband, Cruz. However, after Santana entered rehab, Brandon went back to live with Gina.

Brandon fell into a coma after being assaulted by an accomplice of the Video Rapist, and was rescued by Eden and Cruz. Brandon learned about his paternity in 1989. He forgave Gina for lying to him, and later bonded with his birth mother, Santana. Brandon was one of the rare child characters who never underwent SORAS. Brandon left at the end of 1992, to attend boarding school.

=== C.C. (Channing Creighton) Capwell ===
C.C. (Channing Creighton) Capwell
- Portrayed by: Peter Mark Richman (July 30, 1984 - September 12, 1984) Paul Burke (September 13, 1984 - October 19, 1984 Charles Bateman (October 22, 1984 - December 4, 1985) Jed Allan (January 8, 1986 - January 15, 1993)
- Created by: Bridget and Jerome Dobson
- Introduced by: Bridget and Jerome Dobson and Jeffrey Hayden
In-universe information
- Father: Emmett Capwell
- Brothers: Grant Capwell
- Wife: Pamela Pepperidge Sophia Wayne Gina Demott
- Sons: Mason Capwell Ted Capwell Greg Hughes
- Daughters: Elena Nikolas Eden Capwell Kelly Capwell
- Adoptive sons: Brandon Capwell
- Granddaughters: Samantha Capwell, Adriana Castillo
- Nieces: Courney Capwell, Madeline Capwell Laurent

C.C. Capwell is the patriarch of the wealthy Capwell family serving as the president of Capwell Enterprises. He was first married to Pamela Pepperidge and son Mason was born from the marriage. Pamela fled the marriage and went to England but she was secretly pregnant. C.C. next married Sophia Wayne who gave birth to Channing Capwell III, Eden, Ted, and Kelly. C.C. is widowed after Sophia is presumed dead after a fall from Lionel Lockridge's yacht. He always loses son Channing after he is shot to death in 1979. C.C. has a difficult relationship with Mason but dotes on both daughters.

In 1984, Gina Demott returns to Santa Barbara with her son Brandon. It is revealed that Brandon is really the son of Channing Capwell III and Santana Andrade. C.C. sides with Gina and eventually marries her, making Brandon his grandson and step-son. Sophia Wayne Amonti is actually alive and secretly returns to Santa Barbara and eventually is revealed to C.C. In 1987, C.C. learns that Pamela was pregnant when she left for England. Eden's rival Elena Nikolas is revealed as their daughter. In 1989 C.C. learns that he is the father of Greg Hughes by former lover Megan Richardson. He also has brief relationships with Santana Andrade and Angela Raymond. Despite all this, Sophia remains the love of his life. They are married three separate times and reconcile in the last episode of the series in 1993.

=== Channing Capwell Jr. ===
Channing Capwell, Jr.
- Portrayed by: Robert Brian Wilson
In-universe information
- Other names: Brick Wallace
- Father: Glenn Wallace (biological); C.C. Capwell (legal)
- Mother: Kate Wallace (biological); Sophia Wayne Capwell (legal)
- Half-brothers: Mason Capwell (legal); Ted Capwell (legal); Brick Wallace (legal); Greg Hughes (legal); Channing Capwell III (legal)
- Half-sisters: Elena Nikolas (legal); Kelly Capwell (legal); Eden Capwell (legal)
- Sons: Brandon Capwell

=== Courtney Capwell ===
Julia Campbell (March 12, 1986 – December 18, 1986)

C.C.'s niece Courtney arrived in town from Boston in March 1986 with her sister Madeline; she was as kind and sweet as Madeline was snobbish and vain. She and Pearl Bradford met during the course of a scavenger hunt and fell in love. Madeline was murdered shortly thereafter and Courtney was intent on finding her sister's killer. The leading suspect was Madeline's husband David Laurent, who had been having an affair with his business colleague Sheila Carlisle, but he was acquitted and left town. Later, Courtney was devastated when Pearl fell in love with Kelly Capwell while he was undercover as a patient where Kelly was institutionalized to save her from the corrupt doctor in charge, Dr. Rawlings. Still, she helped Pearl put Dr. Rawlings away and track down his brother Brian, who had been presumed dead after being in Dr. Rawlings' care back in Boston.

While the storyline of Madeline's murder had been dropped for months, suddenly in late fall 1986 Courtney began waking up screaming from nightmares and seeing blood on her hands. She became more and more unraveled and unsuccessfully tried to pin her sister's murder on Keith Timmons, who had secretly been having an affair with Madeline. Brian Bradford, who claimed never to have encountered a murder mystery that he could not solve, came to the conclusion that Courtney must have been the one who killed Madeline. He talked a reluctant Pearl into forcing Courtney to watch a staged re-enactment of the murder at the bungalow where it had happened to force the truth to the surface. Courtney told them that it was true that she killed Madeline, but it was not murder; Madeline had devised an elaborate plot to kill Courtney so she could have their inheritance all to herself, and Courtney was forced to kill her in self-defense. She let David stand trial for the murder because she had seen him come in and find Madeline and know she still had a pulse, and flee without calling for help, so it was clear that he had hoped she'd die. Pearl found a bullet in the wall that corroborated her story. None of them said anything further about the matter and Courtney left town.

=== Kelly Capwell ===
Kelly Capwell Perkins Conrad Barr
- Portrayed by: Robin Wright (July 30, 1984 - June 23, 1988) Kimberly McArthur (June 24, 1988 - February 10, 1989) Carrington Garland (March 24, 1989 - September 27, 1991) Eileen Davidson (November 8, 1991 - January 15, 1993)
- Created by: Bridget and Jerome Dobson
- Introduced by: Bridget and Jerome Dobson and Jeffrey Hayden
In-universe information
- Occupation: Waitress, Advertising Exec, Employee at Capwell Enterprises
- Father: C.C. Capwell
- Mother: Sophia Wayne Capwell Armonti
- Brothers: Ted Capwell
- Sisters: Eden Capwell
- Half-brothers: Mason Capwell Brick Wallace Greg Hughes
- Half-sisters: Elena Nikolas
- Husband: Joe Perkins (1985) Jeffrey Conrad (1987-1989) Quinn Armitage (1990)
- Nieces: Samantha Capwell, Adriana Castillo
- First cousins: Courtney Capwell, Madeline Capwell Laurent

In 1984, Kelly Capwell celebrates her engagement to Peter Flint on the same day that former boyfriend Joe Perkins is released from prison. Joe was exonerated of the killing of Kelly's brother Channing. She falls in love with Joe again and works with him to find the real killer. Peter becomes crazed with jealousy and goes on a killing spree with one of his victim's being Joe. Kelly also learns that her mother Sophia is still alive. Kelly next becomes involved with photographer Nick Hartley who rescues her from a kidnapping. Kelly also gets involved with Nick's brother Dylan. She admits to Nick that she slept with Dylan the evening before their wedding. Dylan becomes obsessed with Kelly and there is a confrontation which ends with Kelly pushing Dylan through the window at the Capwell Hotel resulting in his death. Kelly is institutionalized in a mental health facility.

She then befriends Pearl Bradford before being transferred to Switzerland. While there she falls for Jeffrey Conrad but is shocked to learn he is the son of her father's first wife Pamela. Kelly and Jeffrey both begin working for a pharmaceutical company and are married in 1987. Kelly becomes pregnant but has a miscarriage. Jeffrey becomes distant and Kelly becomes close to T.J. Daniels. Pamela begins to poison Kelly and she falls into a coma. Jeffrey and Kelly divorce.

in 1989, Kelly travels to Paris to help her sister Eden search for her missing baby. She then becomes involved with Ric Castillo, half brother to Eden's husband Cruz. She fights with her family against Robert Barr's attempts to take over Capwell Enterprises. She then falls for Robert before he leaves town. Upon his return, they renew their relationship and marry. However, Kelly really marries Robert's twin brother Quinn who has taken his place. Kelly falls down the stairs in their home and becomes unable to walk. Quinn's lover Flame Beaufort, secretly poisons Kelly. Kelly suffers another miscarriage as a result of the drugs. After the murder of Robert, Kelly breaks from Quinn. She then gets involved with musician Richard Sedgewick, an old family friend. He suffers a heart attack in their hotel room. Quinn helps her with the crisis and the reunite briefly before Kelly has to help him flee town.

After a brief flirtation with Cruz, Kelly finds herself involved with policy officer Connor McCabe and psychiatrist Skyler Gates. Connor helps her investigate Sophia's fiancee Ken Mathis. Kelly and Connor remain a couple when the show concludes.

=== Mason Capwell ===
Mason Capwell
- Portrayed by: Lane Davies (July 30, 1984 - July 21, 1989) Terry Lester (September 29, 1989 - November 1, 1990) Gordon Thomson (November 1, 1990 - January 15, 1993)
- Created by: Bridget and Jerome Dobson
- Introduced by: Bridget and Jerome Dobson and Jeffrey Hayden
In-universe information
- Occupation: Attorney
- Father: C.C. Capwell
- Mother: Pamela Pepperidge Capwell Conrad
- Stepmother: Sophia Wayne Capwell Amonti Capwell Capwell
- Sisters: Elena Nikolas
- Half-brothers: Ted Capwell Greg Hughes Jeffrey Conrad
- Half-sisters: Eden Capwell, Kelly Capwell
- Wife: Victoria Lane (1987-1988) Gina Demott Capwell (1989) Julia Wainwright (1989-1991, 1992-)
- Children: Samantha Capwell
- Nieces: Adriana Castillo
- First cousins: Courtney Capwell, Madeline Capwell Laurent

Mason Capwell is the eldest sibling of the Capwell family. Mason and his father C.C. had a contentious relationship possibly due to the fact the C.C. never forgave Mason's mother Pamela for deserting them. When Joe Perkins is exonerated for the murder of his brother Channing, Mason searches for the identity of the real killer through his position in the D.A. office. Mason briefly pursues Santana Andrade and gets involved with Veronica Gayley

In 1985, his stepmother Sophia is revealed to be alive. Mason engages in a romance with his father's new wife Gina Demott. Mason also learns that his deceased brother Channing had a relationship with another man and reveals this to C.C. Mason also reveals the news the Lionel Lockridge was really the father of Channing. C.C has a heart attack. Mason then falls for C.C.'s new nurse Mary Duvall who is a reformed nun. Mary loves Mason but eventually marries Dr. Mark McCormick. Mason eventually reunites with Mary but she is killed when the letter C from the Capwell Hotel sign falls and kills her. Mason becomes an alcoholic and briefly leaves town.

Mason returns with new love interest, an evangelist known as Lily Light. This relation finally ends after Mason learns that Lily is the daughter of Gina Demott. Mason then gets involved with attorney Julia Wainwright and Julia decides she wants Mason to father her child but with no involvement in raising the child. Mason then takes up with Victoria Lane who is secretly pregnant by Cruz Castillo. After Julia gives birth to their child Samantha, Mason is kidnapped by his long lost sister Elena Nikolas. He is rescued but Elena dies from injuries. Mason divorces Tori and moves in with Julia and their daughter Samantha.

After the remains of Mark McCormick are found, Mason is believed to be his killer. He seeks the true identity of the killer at the convent where Mary lived. He discovers the true killer but then is involved in an explosion in the church. As a result he develops a split personality persona known as Sonny Sprocket. He once again gets involved with Gina which cancels his planned marriage to Julia. Then as he is about to marry Gina, Mason is shot which helps him to remove the alter ego. Mason then marries Julia. Mason begins to drink heavily and is convinced to join Alcoholics Anonymous. He leaves town but returns when Julia is accused of a murder. Julia learns Mason had an affair with Sasha Schmidt. Sasha is murdered and Julia work together to find who killed her. Mason continues to drink and Julia divorces him.

Mason then gets involved with Cassandra Benedict when they both work together running the new Oasis hotel complex. Cassandra is really in love with Warren Lockridge so Mason hastily proposes marriage. At their engagement party, Mason is shot by Craig Hunt but he suspects Warren. Mason and Cassandra run away together but their wedding is stopped by Warren. Mason and Julia are drawn back together and they buy the haunted Ballymoor mansion. Daughter Samantha gets very sick. Mason longs for a second child but they struggle to conceive. The pair take in pregnancy teenager Gracie who wants the couple to adopt her child. After the baby is born, Julia informs Mason that she is also pregnant with his child.

=== Ted Capwell ===
Ted Capwell
- Portrayed by: Todd McKee (July 30, 1984-July 28, 1989) Michael Brainard (October 28, 1991-January 15, 1993)
- Created by: Bridget and Jerome Dobson
In-universe information
- Occupation: Waiter, Disc jockey, horse groom, employee at Capwell Enterprises
- Father: C.C. Capwell
- Mother: Sophia Wayne Capwell Armonti
- Sisters: Eden Capwell, Kelly Capwell
- Half-brothers: Mason Capwell, Brick Wallace, Greg Hughes
- Half-sisters: Elena Nikolas
- Wife: Haley Benson (1986-1987), Lily Blake (1993-)
- Nieces: Samantha Capwell, Adriana Castillo

Ted

=== Rafael Castillo ===
Henry Darrow (June 6, 1989 – May 8, 1990; September 4, 1991 – April 30, 1992)
Castullo Guerra (July 15, 1992 – September 18, 1992)

Rafael Castillo, the father who gave up Cruz, Ric and Carmen years ago, found his way back to Santa Barbara in the middle of 1989. Cruz, Eden and Ric Castillo found him working as a prisoner of a magician in Mexico, and set out to save him. Ric killed the evil magician in order to save his father. Keen on making things right with Cruz and Ric, Rafael started a completely different life in Santa Barbara. Rafael left town after less than a year. In 1991, he found his way back to town, this time with a different storyline. Rafael had started a relationship with Rosa Andrade, a maid of the wealthy Capwell family. In 1992, he revealed that he had an illegitimate son, Rafe Castillo, who also came to Santa Barbara. They worked on building a relationship, but Rafael then disappeared from the canvas in September 1992.

=== Rafe Castillo ===
Robert Fontaine Jr. (March 18, 1992 – January 12, 1993)

Rafe was a part of the final teen set of the show, first appearing in 1992. Rafe was Rafael's illegitimate son. Rafe had had an affair with a woman whose husband was trying to track down Rafe and even attacked him. Rafe fell in love with Lily Blake, who initially spurned his advances. Meanwhile, Lisa Fenimore seduced Rafe and then lied that she was pregnant. Rafe felt obligated to marry Lisa. It was eventually revealed that Lisa had faked not just the pregnancy but the wedding as well—an actor had impersonated the priest. Lily, meanwhile, had moved on to Ted Capwell. Rafe left town.

=== Ric Castillo ===
Peter Love (May 3, 1989 – November 1, 1990)

Ric, the brother of Cruz Castillo, first appeared on the show when Eden and Kelly Capwell went to Paris to find Eden's lost daughter, Adriana. Ric was, at the time, married to a woman named Hollis. Hollis had, apparently coincidentally, bought Adriana from the black market and was raising her as "Charisse Castillo." When Eden and Cruz claimed the child, Hollis committed suicide. Filled with anger, Ric moved to Santa Barbara to seek revenge against his brother. He started dating Sandra Mills, the psychic who had led Cruz and Eden to Paris—Sandra was now obsessed with Cruz. Ric quickly realized that hate would get him nowhere and pursued a relationship with Kelly.

Ric, Eden and Cruz found Ric and Cruz's father Rafael being held prisoner by a magician. In order to rescue his father, Ric was forced to shoot the magician. Ric's relationship with Kelly was short-lived as the wealthy Robert Barr drove a wedge between the couple. Ric's next storyline was an affair with Tawny Richards, a woman soon revealed to be his half-sister—Harland Richards, not Rafael, being Ric's father. Disappointed again in love, Ric left town.

=== Jeffrey Conrad ===
Jeffrey Conrad
- Santa Barbara character
- Portrayed by: Ross Kettle
- First appearance: December 11, 1986
- Last appearance: January 5, 1989
In-universe information
- Father: Michael Conrad
- Mother: Pamela Conrad
- Half-brothers: Mason Capwell
- Half-sisters: Elena Nikolas
- Nieces: Samantha Capwell

Jeffrey Conrad, played by Ross Kettle, made his first appearance on December 11, 1986.

Jeffrey Conrad first appeared when he saved Sophia Capwell from a falling beam at the construction site for Johnny's but was injured himself. The Capwells let him recuperate in their home out of gratitude and gave him a job as the family chauffeur. Jeffrey was driving Pearl to the airport to bring Kelly back from Switzerland, where she was hiding while Gina refused to release the videotape proving Kelly killed Dylan Hartley in self-defense, but a tail on their vehicle from Gina and Keith's PI forced them to make a last minute switch and Jeffrey went to Switzerland in Pearl's place. Jeffrey saved Kelly and brought her back to Santa Barbara, where she was eventually cleared of charges in Dylan's death once Gina finally gave up the tape. Along the way, Jeffrey and Kelly had fallen in love. Jeffrey was then revealed to be the son of Pamela Pepperidge, C.C.'s first wife and Mason's mother. Jeffrey joined Alex Nikolas and his half-brother Mason in attempting to destroy C.C.'s life, but he changed his mind when he realized he would hurt Kelly. Kelly and Jeffrey moved in together and he admitted to her his connection to Pamela and Mason. Kelly chose to trust Jeffrey, even after C.C. revealed that Jeffrey had been suspected of murdering his wife, back in England. Jeffrey and Kelly married in a lavish ceremony.

Jeffrey was overjoyed when Pamela returned to Santa Barbara; gradually, his mother took over his life. Kelly suffered a miscarriage, contributing to stress in their marriage, already introduced by Pamela's interference. Kelly sought comfort in the arms of T.J. Daniels, while Jeffrey was briefly infatuated with a singer named Iliana. Jeffrey joined forces with T.J., who had been rejected by Kelly, to kill Kelly and get her fortune. When Jeffrey had a change of heart, T.J. blackmailed him; this eventually led to a fight between the two men, which left Jeffrey paralyzed. Eventually, Jeffrey recovered but continued to be blackmailed. The situation finally ended when Jeffrey threw T.J. off a train. Soon thereafter, he divorced Kelly and returned to England.

=== Kirk Cranston ===
Joseph Bottoms (September 23, 1985 – April 21, 1986; December 9 – 17, 1987; March 24, 1989 – April 7, 1989)
Robert Newman (April 22, 1986 – May 30, 1986)

First arriving in Santa Barbara during a period of difficulty between Cruz and Eden, Kirk immediately took advantage and split the pair up. Eden married Kirk. Kirk kept many secrets from Eden, the most serious being the knowledge that she was not the one who had disconnected her father from life support. He used this information to blackmail both Eden and the actual culprit, Gina.

Kirk Cranston's manipulation of his roles as a stress inducer and stress reliever played a vital part in his ability to become a reproductive coercer. Here's an incredibly detailed breakdown of how these roles intersected and contributed to his overall scheme:

Stress inducer: Kirk began by posing as Eden's blackmailer, using the false claim that he had evidence of her disconnecting her father's life support system. This put Eden under immense emotional strain, burdened with guilt, and led her to seek support and comfort, which Kirk cleverly provided, paving the way for his role as a stress reliever. It is important to emphasize that Eden did not know that Kirk was the blackmailer. Stress reliever: As Eden's supposed confidant and source of solace, Kirk managed to build trust and cultivate intimacy between them. He was consistently present, offering a shoulder to cry on and providing emotional support during her darkest moments. This bond led to frequent, passionate lovemaking sessions, where Kirk acted as a stress reliever, further deepening their connection.

The connection between the two roles: By masterfully juggling his roles as both a stress inducer and a stress reliever, Kirk created a self-perpetuating cycle that revolved around him. The more stress he caused Eden, the more she relied on him for comfort and relief. This dynamic enabled him to maintain control over her emotions and their relationship, ultimately creating the perfect environment for him to become a reproductive coercer.

Reproductive coercer: With Eden emotionally dependent and physically intimate with him, Kirk spotted an opportunity to secure a permanent place in her life and the Capwell family. He covertly replaced her birth control pills with fakes, ensuring that their passionate encounters would likely result in pregnancy. This deceitful act allowed him to manipulate Eden's reproductive choices without her knowledge or consent, all while hiding his true identity as her blackmailer.

The culmination of the roles: As Eden's pregnancy progressed, Kirk's plan appeared to be successful. His roles as a stress inducer and stress reliever had laid the groundwork for him to become a reproductive coercer, solidifying his connection to the Capwell family and its fortune.

In summary, Kirk Cranston's dual roles as a stress inducer and stress reliever were instrumental in allowing him to assume the role of a reproductive coercer. By expertly manipulating Eden's emotions and exploiting her vulnerability, he managed to control her reproductive choices and further his own agenda, all while maintaining the façade of a loving, supportive partner, despite being her blackmailer. Eden lost her baby in an accident. Kirk blamed Gina, whom he attempted to murder by drowning her in the Capwell fountain. (He was surprised when Gina turned out to be alive weeks later.) Kirk suffered a heart attack, but survived by getting a transplant. He was deeply disturbed to discover that Eden knew about all of his crimes and decided to divorce him. Kirk next tried to kill Cruz and Eden, but Gina stopped him in time. Following a second attempt, he was arrested.

Kirk returned months later when it was revealed that he was behind Elena's suicide. He returned to prison, but resurfaced several years as the culprit behind the kidnapping of Eden and Cruz's daughter Adriana. A year later, Kirk returned once again, this time involved in drug trafficking. He attacked Eden again, but was stopped and eventually stopped by Cruz. Kirk went overboard the boat during a fight with Cruz and was never heard from again.

== D ==
=== T.J. Daniels ===
Christopher Mayer (September 22, 1987 – April 21, 1989)

T.J. was a ski instructor and lothario. After saving her from a car crash, he was briefly involved with Laken Lockridge (on the rebound from Ted Capwell). When Laken left town, T.J. set his sights on Sophia Wayne, with whom he had an affair. However, T.J.'s past came back to haunt him when he had to pay off some debts. T.J. next accepted money from Pamela Conrad to split up Pamela's son Jeffrey and his wife Kelly. T.J. engaged in an affair with Kelly but was thwarted in his ultimate goal by Sophia. T.J. then set his sights on a woman named Buffy to come closer to the Capwells and plotted with Jeffrey to kill Kelly for her fortune. In a confrontation with Jeffrey, T.J. hit him so hard that Jeffrey was briefly paralyzed. After another failed attempt to kill Kelly, he decided to leave town.

=== Aurora DeAngelis ===
Christina Brascia (May 8, 1992 – January 15, 1993)

Aurora DeAngelis was a member of the show's very last teen set. Aurora, the sheltered granddaughter of the villainous Abigail Beckwith, fell in love with Sawyer Walker, another newly introduced character. She encouraged Sawyer to follow his dreams, but their adventures led both of them into trouble. The character was never fully developed as the show ended not long after Aurora's first appearance.

=== Micah DeAngelis ===
Thaao Penghlis (May 8, 1992 – January 15, 1993)

Micah DeAngelis was a mysterious character, first introduced on a train, as Dr. Markus Disgrazia. He assisted Julia Wainwright and her daughter Samantha Capwell. Samantha had symptoms of a serious illness that no one else could diagnose. While hiding his true identity, Micah saved Samantha by using alternative medicine, despite the disapproval of Samantha's father Mason. Markus was eventually revealed as Micah DeAngelis, the son-in-law of the insane, villainous Abigail Beckwith. After the resolution of the Ballymoor storyline, in which Abigail terrorized Julia, Samantha, Mason and Sawyer Walker, Micah began a relationship with police officer Jodie Walker. That relationship never really got started, as Jodie returned to her husband, Reese. Around the same time, Micah struggled with his son Giovanni's decision to become a priest.

=== Heather Donnelly ===
Jane A. Rogers (April 25, 1988 – October 13, 1989)

Dr. Heather Donnelly was first introduced as a hypnotist, attempting to help Dr. Scott Clark discover the truth about the murder of his uncle, Hal. After Scott's recovered memories helped him identify the murderer as Pamela Conrad, he thanked Heather by taking her on a date. This date was interrupted when they learned about a hostage situation at the Capwell mansion and went to the rescue.

Scott and Heather fell in love and moved in together. However, soon Scott left Heather for his ex-girlfriend from high school, prostitute Celeste DiNapoli. When Heather discovered she was pregnant with Scott's child, she chose to raise the child by herself. The couple started a custody battle over little Michael, which was resolved when Heather forgave Scott (Celeste having meanwhile left him for Heather's brother Michael). Heather, Scott and little Michael moved to Chicago and were never heard from again.

=== Christie Duvall ===
Tricia Cast (May 13, 1985 - September 19, 1985)

=== Mary Duvall ===
Harley Jane Kozak (June 25, 1985 – July 15, 1986; February 21–22, 1989)

Mary Duvall first appeared in 1985 when she arrived to support her sister Christie, who had been raped. When first introduced, Sister Mary was living in a convent; later she left the order and began working as a trained nurse. After she left the convent she was hired to take care of C.C. Capwell, who was in a coma. C.C's son Mason was immediately attracted to Mary and before long the two began a relationship, even though Mary was very cautious from the beginning due to her inexperience. Mary's innocence and gentleness brought out a vulnerability and tenderness in Mason, who, for the first time in his life felt loved. Feeling jealous and spurned, Gina orchestrated a seemingly romantic moment between Mason and herself in a way that Mary was sure to witness. Hurt, Mary ended her relationship with Mason and became involved with an old friend, Dr. Mark McCormick.

After an accident nearly killed Mark, he used his life-threatening condition to get Mary to agree to marry him. Ever so kind-hearted Mary agreed despite her love for Mason, because she wanted to give Mark a reason to live. Mason was devastated, but arranged Mary and Mark's wedding at the hospital. To everyone's surprise Mark survived. Mason and Mary remained dear friends after Mary's wedding, although Mason never kept it a secret that he was still very much in love with her, so much so that he wanted Mary's happiness more than his own.

It soon became clear, though, that Mark was not making Mary happy. He was aggressive, abusive and unfaithful. In Mason, Mary found a true friend who would listen to her and comfort her. During her whole marriage, Mary had fought the deep love she felt for Mason, because she really wanted her marriage to work. Although Mary was able to resist him for a while, her unhappy and abusive marriage to Mark and her deep feelings for Mason made it impossible for her to remain with a man she did not love.

Mary finally confessed her true feelings to Mason and the two spent a beautiful holiday in the mountains. Right then and there, Mason who had been afraid of commitment his entire life, asked Mary to marry him and she agreed. When Mary tried to end her unconsummated marriage, Mark raped her. Mary became pregnant and did not know which man had fathered her child. Mason believed the baby was his until he learned about the rape, which filled him with a thirst for revenge. He told Mary that even if the baby was not his, he would love him and raise him as his own because the child was Mary's and he loved Mary more than life. Mason urged Mary to press charges against Mark. During a tragic confrontation between Mary, Mark and Mark's attorney Julia Wainwright on a windy night on the roof of the Capwell Hotel, Mary was seriously injured when the letter "C" from the hotel sign was blown over and fell on her. Mason arrived to the roof just in time to see the sign falling on Mary. He rushed to Mary's side, but there was nothing to be done. Mary and their unborn baby died in Mason's arms. Losing Mary and the child she was carrying devastated Mason. His grief sent him headlong into a bottle, and he eventually left town. Mason eventually was able to get his life back together, but he never fully recovered from losing the greatest love of his life and their unborn baby.

== F ==
=== Lisa Fenimore ===
Leslie Ryan (March 3, 1992 – April 8, 1992)
Bridgette Wilson (April 10, 1992 – January 13, 1993)

Lisa Fenimore was a member of the show's final teen set. A beautiful, spoiled girl, Lisa seduced Rafe Castillo. Fearful that she would lose Rafe to Lilly Blake, Lisa pretended to be pregnant. Rafe, realizing that there was no other way out, decided to marry Lisa. (However, Lisa hired an actor to play the role of the priest.) Despite the best intentions, Rafe could not stay away from Lily. Eventually, Lisa was forced to realize that Rafe would never love her. She ended up confessing her lies and she lost Rafe eventually, who then left town.

== G ==
=== Cain Garver ===
Scott Jaeck (April 20, 1987 – November 22, 1988)

Cain Garver first appeared when he rescued Eden Capwell (who had been left for dead by her vengeful half-sister, Elena Nikolas). Cain took Eden back to his cabin in the Utah mountains and nursed her back to health. While Eden was recovering, Cain fell for her and refused to let her leave his cabin. When Eden managed to escape, he followed her to Santa Barbara and took her hostage again, before being shot by Cruz. Cain lost his memory after the shooting, but got flashbacks to a woman (Elena, in fact) asking him to get rid of Eden. Elena attempted to kill Cain to conceal her secret—and failed.

Despite all of this, Cruz and Eden befriended Cain. Cain joined Cruz's detective agency, the Last Resort, where he investigated the Fox, a dangerous criminal. He fell in love with Andrea Bedford, a woman he initially suspected to be the Fox.

Cain was frustrated when Major Phillip Hamilton, a man from his past, came to town and started messing with his mind. Andrea found out that Soo Li, Cain's former lover, had a daughter named Ming Li, who claimed that Cain was her father. Andrea broke up with Cain after Ming Li attempted to seduce him. It was revealed later that Ming Li was only an actress hired by Hamilton. Cain confronted Hamilton with a gun, but decided not to kill the man. Andrea left town briefly, confused by the conflict between Cain and Hamilton. She and Cain reunited, but soon after, Andrea was brutally raped and murdered by the Video Rapist. Cain was briefly a suspect; after being cleared, he returned to the mountains to attempt to find peace.

=== Veronica Gayley ===
Andrea Howard (August 3, 1984 – January 29, 1985)

Veronica was an assistant to Peter Flint and also (an early on screen) girlfriend of Mason Capwell. Mason slowly fell in love with Veronica, but their relationship was doomed as soon as Veronica mentioned Lionel Lockridge, a man, like Peter, with whom Mason did not get along. Veronica helped Lionel hide when he was pursued by the authorities. Caught up in the middle of Mason's, Peter's and Lionel's fights, Veronica decided to leave town. Weeks later she returned as Eden Capwell's assistant. However, Veronica failed to distance herself from Mason, Peter and Lionel's drama and tragically her days were numbered when she began to realize that Peter was the Carnation Killer. Peter sensed this and killed her in the back garden of her apartment in late January 1985, making her his third murder victim. Mason & Cruz discovered her body placed in her jacuzzi hot tub holding a white carnation flower in one hand. She had been strangled.

=== Amado Gonzalez ===
Rawley Valverde (April 4, 1990 – September 24, 1991)

Amado Gonzalez was a prisoner of a drug trafficking ring who were using him as a hostage to force his older sister, Nikki Alvarez, to spy for them. Cruz, however, managed to free Amado, who then joined his sister in Santa Barbara. Amado became involved in a romance with the wealthy Laken Lockridge. This affair was cut short when Amado was murdered at a party. Although Warren Lockridge was the prime suspect (Amado was standing near Mason Capwell, who was engaged to Warren's lost love, Cassie Benedict), Craig Hunt was eventually revealed as the culprit.

=== Derek Griffin ===
James Healey (January 19, 1990 – July 18, 1990)

Derek was one of the so-called four orphans who were introduced to the show in 1990. Keen on avenging the death of Cassandra Benedict (secretly actually alive), Derek set out to infiltrate Santa Barbara's high society. Derek made friends with Julia Wainwright and C.C. Capwell and even tried to seduce C.C.'s daughter Kelly. He claimed that Mason Capwell was responsible for Cassandra's murder and set out to kill him, but Craig Hunt stopped him. Following a second attempt on Mason's life (foiled by Cassie), he was sent to prison.

== H ==
=== Nick and Dylan Hartley ===
David Haskell (April 30, 1985 – October 17, 1986)
Page Moseley (October 7, 1985 – May 20, 1986)

=== Greg Hughes ===
Paul Johansson (April 11, 1989 – February 12, 1990)

Greg Hughes
In-universe information
- Father: C.C. Capwell
- Mother: Megan Richardson
- Half-brothers: Mason Capwell; Ted Capwell; Channing Capwell III
- Half-sisters: Elena Nikolas; Eden Capwell; Kelly Capwell

High school student Greg was the son of romance novelist Megan Richardson. It soon became clear that Greg's birth father was none other than C.C. Capwell. Greg had a relationship with Celeste DiNapoli's younger sister, Emily. Greg and Emily got married and left town.

=== Craig Hunt ===
John Callahan (August 7, 1989 – January 27, 1992)

Craig Hunt was first introduced as Robert Barr's right-hand man. He was later revealed to be one of the four orphans seeking vengeance for the death of Capwell foster child Cassandra Benedict. Craig was the most dangerous of the four because of his ties to mob boss Anthony Tonell. Craig infiltrated the Capwell family by making friends with C.C. Capwell and seducing his daughter Kelly Capwell—whom he lost to Robert Barr. Next, opportunistic Craig secured his position in the Capwell family by becoming C.C.'s right-hand man, replacing Mason. After Mason was shot by an unknown assailant at the party celebrating his engagement to Cassandra—a bullet that ripped through Mason and killed waiter Amado Gonzalez—Warren Lockridge became the prime suspect. Warren discovered he was being framed, and with his lover Angela Raymond's help, they started to suspect Craig as the gunman. Craig became more desperate as Angela and Warren closed in on him. Craig blew up Warren's newspaper office, and then attempted to kill Angela. Cassandra managed to convince Craig to surrender; he was then sent to prison.

== J ==
=== Alice Jackson ===
Marie-Alise Recasner (May 27, 1986 – April 8, 1987)

First introduced as Kelly Capwell's roommate at Dr. Rawlings' asylum, Alice proved her friendship to Kelly by helping Pearl Bradford and Dr. Moore to rescue Kelly from the institution. Lionel Lockridge helped Alice by arranging for her release from the asylum into his care. She confided in Pearl that his brother, Brian, believed to have committed suicide, was actually alive. When Brian was tracked down, Alice was disappointed that he no longer cared for her and was interested in Jane Wilson.

Alice fell for a police officer named Paul Whitney, and at the same time became a model for Nick Hartley. She learned that her mother had died, but she was even more shocked to find out that her real mother was actually Caroline Wilson. Alice and Caroline had a strained relationship, but eventually made up. When Gus got a job in Chicago, Alice decided to leave town with her father.

== K ==
=== Andie Klein ===
Krista Tesreau (August 20, 1992 – January 15, 1993)

Andie was one of the final characters introduced before the show's demise. She entered the world of Santa Barbara as the mistress of Ken Mathis, a con artist engaged to Sophia Wayne. The couple secretly had an affair for a few months, but Andie refused to sit still while Ken was having his cake and eating it too. She dated Reese Walker, who had recently left his wife Jodie, but their love never took because Reese was still in love with his wife. Andie then went crazy and poisoned Ken, who died. In the very last episode, Andie, having escaped from prison, threatened the wedding of Warren Lockridge and B.J. Walker with a rifle, but was stopped in time by Connor McCabe.

== L ==
=== Jack Lee and Jerry Cooper ===
Joel Crothers (April 10, 1985 – September 5, 1985)
Mark Schneider (August 28, 1985)

Jack Lee was first introduced as the lawyer of C.C. Capwell. He tried to seduce Augusta Lockridge, but then crossed paths with her sister Julia, who immediately recognized him, though he had no idea who she was. However, he pretended to recognize her and they started a relationship. Jack started acting strangely when it was revealed that he was the father of Amy Perkins' unborn child. Jack's confusion was understandable: he was actually Jerry Cooper, Jack's look-alike cousin: he had imprisoned his cousin, whom he was impersonating.

Jerry killed his accomplice Dr. Renfro so his crimes would not be revealed. He kidnapped his child and left town, while Jack was released from his imprisonment. Jack, however, was not as innocent as everyone thought: he had planned to separate Eden Capwell and Cruz Castillo. Jack disappeared rather suddenly (due to Joel Crothers's failing health), and his storyline was rewritten for a new character, Kirk Cranston, Jack's adoptive son.

=== Caroline Wilson Lockridge ===
Lenore Kasdorf (October 6, 1986 – July 1, 1987)

Caroline Wilson came to Santa Barbara in 1986 to re-connect with her daughter Jane, but this task proved much tougher than Caroline had expected. Caroline fell for Lionel Lockridge, the same man Jane had a crush on. Caroline's past came back to haunt her when it was revealed that her former lover Gus Jackson was in town. Years before, Caroline had had a daughter with Gus. Gus had raised Alice with his wife, whom Alice believed to be her birth mother. Caroline now attempted to forge a relationship with yet another daughter.

With C.C.'s help, Caroline set out to repair her past mistakes. She helped spring Gus out of jail and then revealed to Alice that she was her mother and that she had known all along that Alice was imprisoned in an asylum. With time, Alice forgave Caroline, who was then able to move on with her life. Caroline moved to Chicago, but eventually returned to Santa Barbara after falling ill from a virus. She married Lionel while searching for a cure. She died after taking an experimental serum developed by Alex Nikolas.

=== Minx Lockridge ===
Minx Lockridge
- Santa Barbara character
- Portrayed by: Judith Anderson (July 30, 1984–June 10, 1987); Janis Paige (October 10, 1990–January 15, 1993)
- First appearance: Episode 1 July 30, 1984
- Last appearance: Episode 2137; January 15, 1993
- Created by: Bridget and Jerome Dobson
In-universe information
- Occupation: Socialite
- Spouse: T. MacDonald Lockridge (dissolved)
- Children: Lionel Lockridge; Cassandra Benedict
- Grandchildren: Brick Wallace; Warren Lockridge (legal); Laken Lockrige; Channing Creighton Capwell-Lockridge (adoptive)

Minx, widow of T. Macdonald Lockridge ('T' for Tiger) was the matriarch of the Lockridge family, a woman with a strong personality and a mysterious past that kept coming back to haunt her. The strong-willed Minx seemed to dislike her daughter-in-law, Augusta Wainwright because of her often frivolous ways, but often it was clear that Minx was somewhat amused by Augusta's silliness. A lifelong hater of anything Capwell, Minx initially did not like her granddaughter Laken's relationship with Ted Capwell, either. As she began to realize that Ted was nothing like his father, she began to like him, and even helped Laken and Ted sneak around behind Augusta's back simply to aggravate her vain daughter-in-law. During the show's early days, she was seen protesting C.C.'s off-shore oil drilling, claiming it was a threat to the environment and the coastline.

Later on when Sophia Wayne Capwell, C.C.'s supposed late wife and Lionel's former lover, was revealed to be alive, Minx had a dramatic confrontation with her, but Sophia made it clear that she was in town to stay and would not allow Minx to intimidate her or cause any problems for her children. When Augusta became suspicious that Lionel was cheating on her, she arranged for Minx to find Lionel with several scantily clad blondes, but they were merely playing cards. Minx lectured Lionel about his responsibilities as a Lockridge, and Augusta's scheme backfired on her when Minx ended up giving Lionel control over some of their assets, hoping that it would make him more serious.

The family found it strange when Minx employed Brick Wallace to work at her mansion, even aiding him in helping his girlfriend Amy Perkins find out information on the child she had given up for adoption. Brick began to investigate Minx's interest in him, only to have it revealed later that he was actually the son of Sophia and Lionel, whom Minx had switched with another child (the one raised as Channing Capwell Jr.) so she would not have to watch the Capwells raise him. When a vengeful C.C. arranged to take the Lockridge mansion away from her, Minx retaliated by shooting him in the rear-end with an antique gun owned by her late husband filled with buckshot.

Minx disappeared from town in 1987 and reappeared surprisingly in 1990 with a brand new outlook on life. She found a good business strategy involving spring water on the old Lockridge estate that started another war between the Capwells and the Lockridges, as Minx worked to buy back her property from C.C. Capwell. The truth behind her return, however, was much different from what others presumed. Minx was actually looking for the illegitimate child she had given away at birth. She hired Michael Donnelly, who discovered the newly returned Capwell foster child Cassandra Benedict was Minx's long-lost daughter. Cassandra and Minx did not get along at first, but Cassandra eventually forgave her mother for what she had done. Around the same time, it was revealed that Minx's supposed grandson, Warren, was fathered by an unknown man, not her son, Lionel. This left Warren and Cassandra free to become involved as they had been years before while Warren was roaming around Europe. Minx was devastated when Cassandra began to show signs of insanity after Warren fell in love with another woman, and was forced to have her committed. Later on, Minx begrudgingly accepted Gina DeMott as Lionel's new wife, even though she had once been married to C.C.

== M ==
=== Ken Mathis ===
Mark McCoy (March 12, 1992 – January 9, 1993)

Ken Mathis entered the world of Santa Barbara in the middle of 1992, a period during which many new characters appeared. Ken was a gymnastics professor who managed to charm Sophia Wayne. The two began a short relationship, which eventually led to Ken convincing Sophia to marry him. Unfortunately, Ken was only after Sophia's money. He was slowly poisoning his new wife and working on changing her will so that everything would be left to him. Meanwhile, Ken had an affair with Andie Klein, but she eventually resisted his charms and sought attention in other places. Sophia's ex-husband C.C. Capwell was suspicious of Ken, but was never able to prove Ken's lies. When the truth was finally revealed, Andie managed to find a way to escape prison—by murdering Ken.

=== Connor McCabe ===
Charles Grant (August 11, 1992 – January 15, 1993)

Appearing during the show's final months, Connor McCabe immediately proved himself to be a valuable member of the Santa Barbara police department—stepping in to fill the void left by Cruz's departure. He worked diligently on resolving the Frank Goodman murder case. When the trial ended, Connor romanced Kelly Capwell, who still had feelings for Cruz. However, they ended up together in the final moments of the series.

== N ==
=== Dash Nichols ===
Timothy Gibbs (August 3, 1990 – January 27, 1992)

When the Blue Sky Brigade was introduced in 1990, Dash made his first appearance as one of the supporters of the movement, also working as a doctor. To help out the brigade, Dash hired Julia Wainwright to help him fight the court battle against Capwell Enterprises, the supporters of the Oasis project, which would harm the local environment. Mason Capwell, who had started drinking again, suspected that Julia and Dash were having an affair, so his marriage ended, and Julia and Dash spent a night together. A day later, Julia regretted making love to Dash, but he, thinking she did not really believe it, forced her to make love to him again.

Julia, shaken up by Dash's actions, accused him of rape and the matter was taken to court, where Dash was forced to re-live the events of the death of his former patient. Dash was set free, and Julia took the matter in her own hands by kidnapping him and forcing him to admit what he did to her. Even though he finally admitted what he did, Dash was not aware of his behavior until he saved a woman from rape one day. Keen on making things right, Dash decided to help out Katrina Ruyker, and they began a love story constantly interrupted by C.C.'s belief that Dash was a dangerous person. When he lost his job, Dash left town to find another one. Katrina stayed in town for a while, but later left and announced that she'd be looking for Dash.

=== Alex Nikolas ===
Michael Durrell (March 11, 1987 – January 25, 1988)

Alex came to town at the time of the wedding of C.C. Capwell and Sophia Wayne. He immediately made friends with C.C., but nobody knew the hatred that he felt for him because of the way C.C.had treated his ex-wife, Pamela. Alex was a doctor working on a medicine that could cure the illness that Caroline Wilson Lockridge had. He warned people not to take the serum before he could test it, but people including Lionel Lockridge, Gina and Keith Timmons stole it and gave it to Caroline, who then died from the effects of the serum.

Alex confessed to murdering his daughter, Elena, but it was later revealed that Elena had shot herself. At about this same time, Pamela returned to Santa Barbara. Realizing that Pamela no longer had feelings for him, Alex chose to leave town.

=== Elena Nikolas ===
Elena Nikolas
- Santa Barbara character
- Portrayed by: Sherilyn Wolter
- First appearance: April 10, 1987
- Last appearance: September 28, 1987
In-universe information
- Other names: Eleanor Norris
- Father: C.C. Capwell
- Mother: Pamela Conrad
- Brothers: Mason Capwell
- Half-brothers: Jeffrey Conrad; Ted Capwell; Greg Hughes; Channing Capwell III
- Half-sisters: Kelly Capwell; Eden Capwell

Elena Nikolas, played by Sherilyn Wolter, made her first appearance on April 10, 1987.

Elena was the long-lost daughter of C.C. Capwell and Pamela Pepperidge Capwell Conrad. When Pamela left town years prior, she took with her the secret of carrying what would be C.C.'s second child. Under the alias of Eleanor Norris, Elena arrived in Santa Barbara with plans of seeking revenge on the Capwells, most notably following Eden and Cruz to the mountains of Utah where they were to be married. After kidnapping Eden and leaving her for dead, Elena resumed her life in Santa Barbara and attempted to get closer to Cruz. A paralyzed Eden eventually returned to Santa Barbara where Elena continued to wreak havoc on Eden and Cruz and tried to drive a wedge between them. After orchestrating Mason's kidnapping, as well as an attempt on Kelly's life, Elena framed Cruz for her own murder. When C.C. discovered a wounded and dying Elena lying on the ground, she uttered the words "Cruz killed me, Daddy," before dying. Dr. Alex Nikolas eventually admitted what Elena had done as he was present and witnessed her taking her own life. As the truth behind her murder began to unfold, so did her machinations along with the discovery that she was not working alone but with accomplice, and Eden's ex-husband, Kirk Cranston.

== P ==
=== Jackie Baldwin Parks ===
Martina Deignan (January 3, 1985 – May 8, 1985)

When she made her first appearance on the show, Jackie immediately won the hearts of the viewers. She was a very tender and interesting person, and she immediately made friends with Amy Perkins. Jackie was, at the time, waiting for her husband Larry to return. She got a job as a teacher at the Santa Barbara school. When Peter Flint kidnapped Amy Perkins, Jackie found out that Larry returned to town and the couple had not time for a reunion because they had to somehow help their friends. When the situation was finally resolved, Jackie was forced to see Larry leave again, but that would be the last time she saw him. A month or two after his departure, Jackie learned that Larry was killed, and she then quietly left town.

=== Lady Elizabeth Peale ===
Lauren Chase (December 12, 1984 – March 5, 1985)

The English born Lady Elizabeth Peale made her first appearance on Santa Barbara in December 1984, when she attended a conference in her father's behalf, but her visit was actually carefully planned by Lionel and herself. Elizabeth and Lionel faked being mortal enemies in front of C.C. Capwell, with whom Lionel did not get along too well. C.C. offered to take care of Elizabeth, while she was plotting with Lionel how to plan the rescue of the Amanda Lockridge, a boat that was presumed to have sunk containing expensive jewelry that both of them wanted to get their hands on.

While staying at the Capwell mansion, Elizabeth played with Gina's mind by attempting to seduce C.C., but she was actually interested in Brick Wallace, a man who constantly refused to get along with Elizabeth. She constantly asked him to be her model and even offered him money for his services, but he was interested in another woman. Elizabeth finally broke down in front of Brick and confided in him about her insecurities. She then became close friends with Warren Lockridge and even helped Warren hide when he was pursued by the authorities for the murder of Channing Capwell, Jr. When her job with Lionel finally finished, Elizabeth quietly left Santa Barbara behind in early March 1985 and never made a return visit.

=== Jade Perkins ===
Melissa Reeves (July 30, 1984 – August 9, 1985)

Jade was Joe Perkins' youngest sister, and a valuable member of the very first teen storyline. Along with Danny Andrade, Ted Capwell and Laken Lockridge, Jade tried out her luck in Hollywood as a star, only to end up learning a valuable lesson with a sleazy movie producer, after being warned about him by Peaches DeLight, a movie star. She then returned to Santa Barbara with the rest of the teen set and they found themselves a place to hang out, and started college. Danny and Jade were in love with each other. With time, after her brother Joe died in the hospital, Jade was phased out and later forgotten about.

=== John Perkins ===
Robert Alan Browne (July 30, 1984 – November 13, 1984)

John was the father of Joe, Jade and Amy Perkins, married to Marisa and leading a peaceful life working for Capwell Enterprises. John showed his true colors when he learned that his son Joe, who had just been released from prison, was dating Kelly Capwell, his boss's daughter. He did not approve of their relationship and was short-minded when it came to socialization between the rich and the working class. John deeply believed that his son was guilty of murdering Channing until weeks later, when he realized Joe did not do the crime. Joe was presumed dead and John was sorry for everything he had done. He rejoined his family, but not long after that he died in the earthquake that hit the town.

=== Marisa Perkins ===
Valorie Armstrong (July 30, 1984 – April 26, 1985, December 25, 1985)

Marisa was the mother of Joe, Jade and Amy Perkins and a loyal wife to John Perkins, whom she often had to influence to fix his behavior and attitude towards their children. She loved her children no matter what they did in their lives and was always there for them when they needed her. She did not have much of a story aside from her children's. She was shown to be tough when she needed to be, especially when John was opposed to having Joe back home. She kicked John out of the house for his behavior, but forgave him once he realized how wrong he was. After her husband died in the earthquake and her son was killed by Peter Flint, she was rarely seen (on screen) for the remainder of 1985 and eventually she decided to leave town for good in 1986.

=== Shannon Pressman ===
Lori Hallier (April 13, 1990 – June 4, 1990)

Shannon Pressman is the home care nurse who comes to the district attorney Ethan Asher's apartment, after his accident orchestrated by his wife Laura who tries to kill him. Hired by Craig Hunt, Shannon is in charge for taking care of Ethan.

== R ==
=== David Raymond ===
John Beck (July 8, 1991 – July 1, 1992)

David was the town's newest judge and the husband of Angela Cassidy. Their marriage was on shaky ground when they first arrived in town and was completely destroyed when Angela pursued an affair with Warren Lockridge, while David seduced Julia Wainwright, who was working for him at his office. Angela was jealous over David's infatuation with Julia, even though nothing ever happened between the two. David and Angela divorced and David was not seen much after that.

=== Gretchen and Harland Richards ===
Jenny Lester-McKeon (May 14, 1990 – July 3, 1990)
Rosalind Allen (July 17, 1990 – September 1990)
Allan Miller (August 10, 1990 – September 1990)

Originally cast as contract characters, they were both soon phased out. Gretchen first appeared in May 1990 as an owner of a bar in Santa Barbara, where she hooked up with Mack Blake—without revealing to Mack that she was married. Her husband Harland, a rich businessman, arrived in town three months later when it was revealed that Ric Castillo was actually his son. Gretchen did not love Harland and was looking for a way to get rid of him, so she started trying to convince Mack to kill Harland so their love would grow, but Mack was not convinced by her strange explanations and refused to do so. Gretchen attempted to kill Harland on one occasion but missed, leaving Mack to realize that she was not worth his time. Gretchen and Harland both disappeared from the canvas, leaving his daughter Tawny from a previous marriage the only remaining member of their family in town, but even she left two months later.

=== Tawny Richards ===
Julie St. Claire (April 13, 1990 – November 1, 1990)

Tawny Richards was the daughter of a wealthy businessman, Harland Richards, and his first deceased wife. She came to town in 1990, only to exit the show in the same year, after both of her parents were written off the show. Tawny started dating Ric Castillo, and they were both surprised later when Ric found out that Tawny's father Harland had an affair with Ric's mother. After they learned they were half-siblings, they both left town.

=== Katrina Ruyker ===
Maria Ellingsen (May 28, 1991 – October 2, 1992)

Katrina—the daughter of friends C.C. made in Germany—came to town to live with the Capwells. She started a relationship with Dash Nichols even though C.C., who was very protective of Katrina, advised her to watch herself due to Dash's past with Julia. Dash eventually ended up moving away to pursue a job, leaving Katrina alone. Katrina was seduced by Ted not long after that, but their relationship did not last long. Katrina decided to move away, and her first thought was to go find Dash.

== S ==
=== Sasha Schmidt ===
Michelle Nicastro (September 26, 1989 – May 2, 1990)

Sasha first appeared in Santa Barbara when Mason Capwell returned from his departure to investigate Anthony Tonell, a mob boss. It was quickly revealed that Sasha was not only Mason's lover, but she was also the mistress of the already mentioned Anthony. Sasha was surprised to learn that Mason was already married when they started their affair. Anthony, who learned about Sasha's affair with Mason, then kidnapped her, but ended up getting killed. Meanwhile, Anthony's wife Augusta Lockridge realized that Sasha and Mason were having an affair, but she kept the truth from her sister Julia, Mason's wife.

Sasha helped Mason in his hunt for Craig Hunt, a dangerous man, and she found herself on the exploding boat. Mason offered her a chance for safety but only if she left town, but Sasha, realizing that Mason only wanted to get rid of her, refused to go and she made up a plan to get revenge on Julia, making it seem like she was somehow responsible for the boat explosion. Julia and Mason found out about Sasha's schemes and they tricked her into giving them the info that she had.

Sasha then finally decided to come clean about her plots to District Attorney Ethan Asher. She visited him in his office but accidentally ended up being a murder victim. Ethan's wife Laura, who had just been released from an asylum, wanted to shoot her husband but ended up accidentally shooting Sasha. Sasha's body was later found by Julia, who hid it in a freezer with Mason, and they started investigating the murder of the poor woman. Sasha's sister Sidney came to town until they finally revealed who was behind her murder.

=== Stephen Slade ===
Richard Hatch (January 12, 1990 – March 19, 1990)
John O'Hurley (March 22, 1990 – January 16, 1991)

Stephen Slade was one of the four orphans who made their way into Santa Barbara in 1990. He was a movie producer who led Sophia Capwell to accept acting in a movie production that turned out to be the exact adaptation of the Capwell family history. He also tried to avenge the death of Cassandra Benedict, but when Cassie returned home alive, she was keen on stopping Stephen from going through with the movie production. She burned the manuscript and stopped everything. Stephen then tried to seduce Cassie, but she rejected him, and then Stephen decided to leave town.

== T ==
=== Keith Timmons ===
Justin Deas (May 16, 1986 – October 13, 1988)
Robin Strand (April 4, 1988 – April 8, 1988)
John Novak (November 15, 1990 – April 4, 1991)

A humorous character named Keith Timmons came to Santa Barbara to be the new district attorney, and he quickly gained the sympathy of the characters with his wit, but also gained enemies, most notably the Capwells. While searching for answers, it was clear that Keith did not like Cruz Castillo, a man who refused to date his sister Katie, who ten years ago drowned herself because Cruz did not want her. Keith took a love interest in Santana Andrade, who had been at the time drugged by Gina DeMott. Keith and Gina started to develop feelings for each other, but both refused to admit it, at the time.

Keen on making the life of the Capwell family harder, Keith stopped at nothing to blame any of the members for possible misdeeds, even though he knew they were innocent. Gina suffered from temporarily blindness and fell in love with Dr. Scott Clark. Keith, realizing that he wanted to keep Gina for himself, told her how he felt about her. They moved in together and married in August 1988, but Keith was eventually forced to leave Santa Barbara.

Two years later, Keith returned to town in an attempt to win Gina back, but she was still hurt about his speedy departure from the town. Keith was also threatened by thugs, which made his relationship with Gina even more impossible. When he realized he would not be able to win Gina back, Keith left town again, this time for good.

== W ==
=== Jodie DeWitt Walker ===
Kim Zimmer (March 27, 1992 – January 15, 1993)

Jodie DeWitt Walker first appeared on Santa Barbara in early 1992, and was a member of a new core family that moved to town. Jodie was a long-time friend of Cruz Castillo, who encouraged her and her husband Reese to come to town. Jodie had a lot to deal with when she arrived to town. She was stressed out when her job as a police officer came in between her taking care of her family. Her husband Reese was suspicious of Jodie's friendship with Cruz, her daughter B.J. was prosecuted for murder, and her son Sawyer escaped from town to pursue his dreams. When B.J.'s kidnapper Frank Goodman kidnapped Jodie and Cruz, Jodie revealed to Cruz that B.J. was actually his daughter. The news took a huge hit on Jodie's marriage, and both Reese and Jodie looked for comfort in other people. Jodie found love again with Micah DeAngelis, but she later realized that her one and only true love was Reese.

=== Reese Walker ===
Forry Smith (March 27, 1992 – January 15, 1993)

Reese Walker came to Santa Barbara in early 1992, following his wife's wish to come back to town. Both he and his wife Jodie were police officers, and neither of them knew of the trouble that was waiting for them in town. Reese was always suspicious of Cruz and Jodie's friendship, and when he learned that B.J. is not actually his daughter, their marriage was shred to pieces. At the same time, Reese had to fight with the fact that B.J. was abused by a close friend Frank Goodman, and he tried to find his son Sawyer who escaped to find himself. Reese found comfort in Andie Klein, a mistress of Ken Mathis, but later he realized that he loved his wife and they reunited.

=== Sawyer Walker ===
Eric Close (March 3, 1992 – January 15, 1993)

The first member of the Walker family to arrive in Santa Barbara was Sawyer Walker, a teenaged boy suspected of being gay in school before the rest of the class learned the boy he was talking to was actually his sister B.J. in a disguise. Sawyer had a passion for boxing which his father Reese did not approve of. He fell for Lily Blake, who was at the time interested in Ted Capwell and courted by Rafe Castillo. Sawyer had a fight with Rafe over the woman, but lost interest in Lily and found someone else for himself, a new girl in town named Aurora DeAngelis.

Sawyer defended his sister B.J. when her rapist Frank Goodman came to town, so he turned out to be the first murder suspect when Frank was killed. He ran away from the authorities with Aurora and they moved to Boston. To pay for his new life, Sawyer started boxing, much to Aurora's displeasure. His life reverted to its old self when he was safe to return to Santa Barbara. Sawyer was frustrated when his parents split, but they reunited not long after that. At the end of the series, he was still dating Aurora.

=== Amy Perkins Wallace ===
Kerry Sherman (October 16, 1984 – September 12, 1986)
Amy Wilkinson (May 23, 1985 – May 24, 1985)

Amy joined her family in Santa Barbara in October 1984, and announced to her family that she was happily in love with Jeff Barber, who apparently proposed to her. Soon after Amy's arrival, Jeff broke contact with her, so she sought comfort in the arms of Brick Wallace. Upon learning that she was pregnant, Amy went to see Jeff about it, but he claimed it could not be his child because he was sterile. Amy decided to raise the baby on her own. Brick started worrying when Jeff turned up dead without the killer being revealed.

Amy was shocked when she gave birth to the baby and her doctor claimed it was born dead. Realizing that he was lying, Amy accepted the help of Brick and Julia Wainwright in uncovering the truth, which is quite different from what she thought because she was apparently inseminated without her approval by her dentist. She learned that her boss Jack Lee was involved in the mystery and went to the island of New Stailand, where she learned that the monarchy's king was actually the father of her baby.

Amy managed to get her baby back and returned to Santa Barbara to lead a happy life with Brick. The two got married and Brick adopted the baby. Amy found a job as a waitress at a beach bar, which would ultimately be the reason for her death. While working, she ended up accidentally killed in a fire, started by an exploding projectile thrown by Hayley Benson.

=== Brick Wallace ===
Brick Wallace
- Santa Barbara character
- Portrayed by: Richard Eden
- First appearance: October 11, 1984
- Last appearance: October 26, 1987
In-universe information
- Father: Lionel Lockridge
- Mother: Sophia Wayne Capwell
- Half-brothers: Ted Capwell; Channing Creighton Capwell-Lockridge (adoptive)
- Half-sisters: Laken Lockridge; Kelly Capwell; Eden Capwell

Brick Wallace played by Richard Eden made his first appearance on October 11, 1984.

Brick Wallace's story started when he got a job as a driver for the Lockridge family. Minx Lockridge, the matriarch of the family, had a weird connection to him and would often help him out when he needed money. Brick fell for Amy Perkins, who had just recently come to town, and the two started dating. He loved Amy so much that he was ready to raise the child she was carrying even though it was not his. Brick helped out Amy when her baby was kidnapped and went on an adventure on the island of New Stailand to find the baby after it was kidnapped by Jerry Cooper and Dr. Renfro, Amy's doctor. Brick and Julia Wainwright helped Amy find the baby, who was supposed to be crowned king of the island.

Once they came back to town, Brick and Amy's life settled and they started to live in peace. However, Brick's life changed when he learned the real reason why Minx was taking care of him—he was actually her grandson whom Minx exchanged with Channing Capwell, Jr., who was actually a Wallace. Amy and Brick got married soon after that, but things took a turn for the worse when Amy was killed in a fire at the bar where she was working, which was started by an exploding projectile thrown by Hayley Benson. In order to honor Amy, Brick bought the place where she was killed with Lily Blake's help.

When Hayley was raped, Brick was one of the suspects, especially after his boots were identified as the ones the rapist was wearing. Brick was imprisoned but released when it was proved that he had nothing to do with the rape. Brick met Jane Wilson and they quickly fell in love. He changed his life by entering the police academy, but did not stay long after he helped Cruz Castillo escape from prison. He then chose to leave town with Jane and Johnny, his adoptive baby from Amy.

=== Jane Wilson ===
Jane Sibbett (May 20, 1986 – October 26, 1987)

When she first came to town, Jane was working at the same radio station where Ted Capwell was working as a disc jockey. Jane had a strong personality, yet nobody knew that in her spare time, Jane turned herself into a vamp named Roxanne who then teased people around town. As a child, Jane was bothered by her mother, whom she met again in Santa Barbara. Jane soon fell in love with Lionel Lockridge, with whom she shared an interest in paleontology, but Lionel, realizing that the difference in age was too strong, decided to push her into the arms of his son Warren.

Lionel then fell in love with Jane's mother Caroline, and she did her best to separate them, especially after she found out about her mother's child named Alice Jackson. Jane found out that Alice was the daughter of Gus Jackson, a man who recently left prison. Jane tried to plot against her mother, but after realizing that her mother had a deathly illness, she forgave her and even encouraged Lionel to marry her. Later, Jane fell in love with Brick Wallace, who had recently lost his love Amy Perkins. The two started bonding and eventually left town together when Brick got a good job offer out of town.

== Minor characters ==
- Channing Capwell III
- Margot Collins played by Eva LaRue (March 2 – July 15, 1988) – Margot was a short-term contract role, a waitress working at The Lair who was Ted Capwell's friend.
- Celeste DiNapoli played by Signy Coleman (November 28, 1988 – November 6, 1989) – Celeste was Scott Clark's ex-girlfriend who broke up Scott and Heather when Heather was pregnant. Scott dumped her after learning that Celeste had become a hooker.
- Maggie Gillis played by Suzanne Marshall (February 26 – July 19, 1985) – Maggie started working at the Santa Barbara police station along with Cruz during the Carnation Killer storyline. After facing a few tough days as a cop, Maggie sought comfort in a friendship with Warren Lockridge. After a few months their relationship developed from friendship to a brief romantic affair but never went anywhere because Maggie refused to leave her wheelchair-using husband for Warren. Towards the end of Maggie's time in Santa Barbara her husband died.
- Frank Goodman played by Nicholas Walker (June 16 – November 25, 1992) – Frank was a friend of Jodie and Reese Walker who raped their daughter B.J. during her childhood and came back when they moved to Santa Barbara to attack her again, only to end up killed.
- Phillip Hamilton played by Warren Burton (April 11, 1988 – January 23, 1989) – Major Phillip was Cain's Vietnam war superior who desperately tried to win over Andrea Bedford for himself, and was one of the suspects when she was murdered.
- Zach Kelton played by Leigh McCloskey (August 8, 1988 – February 3, 1989) – Dr. Zach Kelton was a gynecologist, later revealed to be the Video Rapist who terrorized the women of Santa Barbara, including Eden Capwell. He died after falling off a cliff.
- Jake Morton played by Rick Edwards (January 5, 1987 – April 22, 1988) – After getting raped, Hayley Benson could not face her husband Ted Capwell, so she sought comfort in the arms of Jake Morton. The couple fell in love, and Hayley and Ted divorced, but Hayley was soon killed, and Jake left town afterwards.
- Celia Robbins played by Nina Arvesen (October 2–8, 1987) – Celia was a policewoman who appeared in three episodes. The actress who played the role, Nina Arvesen, returned to Santa Barbara in the role of Angela Raymond.
- Lydia Saunders played by Jeanna Michaels (July–November 22, 1988, January 25, 1989) – Lydia was a journalist who worked along with Eden, and had a short fling with her father C.C.
- Bunny Tagliatti played by Joe Marinelli (October 20, 1988 – October 18, 1990) – Bunny was a mobster who liked to dress up as a woman. He had a crush on Gina.
- King of New Stailand played by Duncan Ross (June 10, 1985 – August 1, 1985) – the King of New Stailand, whose name is not revealed in the series, is the father of Amy Perkins Wallace's child.
- Martin Ellis played by John Wesley Shipp (October 17 - October 31, 1986) Victoria Lane's tennis pro ex-boyfriend, who followed her to Santa Barbara after an insecure Eden tracked him down in France and let him know her whereabouts. Eden didn't realize he was abusive, however, and was horrified when she discovered he had beaten Tori up after she refused to get back together with him. He suffered a leg injury that permanently ended his tennis career during a fight with Cruz.
