= Rawley Valverde =

American television actor

- Born: January 1, 1966 (age 60)
- Education: University of California, Los Angeles
- Occupation: Television actor

Rawley Valverde (born January 1, 1966) is an American television actor. He is best known for playing Amado Gonzalez in the American soap opera television series Santa Barbara.

== Life and career ==
Valverde was raised in Ontario, California. He attended the University of California, Irvine and the University of California, Los Angeles, majoring in psychology. He worked as a mobile disc jockey, and he performed as a DJ at the 1984 Summer Olympics. He began his screen career in 1987, appearing in the CBS drama television series Houston Knights. In 1988, he appeared in the Fox sitcom television series Boys Will Be Boys.

Later in his career, Valverde guest-starred in television programs including Married... with Children, Paradise, Just the Ten of Us and JAG. In addition to his guest-appearances, he played Amado Gonzalez, the drug trafficking prisoner, in the NBC soap opera television series Santa Barbara. His final appearance on Santa Barbara was in September 1991, when his character died after getting shot. In 1999, he played Marty on Days of Our Lives. Aside from acting, he worked as a news anchor for Channel One News.
