= Eden Capwell and Cruz Castillo =

Eden Capwell
- Santa Barbara character
- Portrayed by: Marcy Walker
- First appearance: Episode 45; September 28, 1984
- Last appearance: Episode 1773; August 9, 1991
- Created by: Bridget and Jerome Dobson
In-universe information
- Other names: Eden Tyler Capwell (full name); Princess (nickname given by C.C.); Nancy Burgess (alias used as Adriana's nanny in Paris); Lisa (alternate personality); Suzanne Collier (alternate personality); Channing Capwell, Jr. (alternate personality)
- Occupation: Executive at Capwell Enterprises; Manager of the Orient Express Restaurant; Reporter for KSB-TV Station Channel 8
- Parents: C.C. Capwell; Sophia Wayne Capwell
- Brothers: Ted Capwell
- Sisters: Kelly Capwell
- Half-brothers: Mason Capwell; Brick Wallace; Greg Hughes; Channing Capwell III
- Half-sisters: Elena Nikolas
- Spouse: Kirk Cranston (1985–1986); Cruz Castillo (1988–1992)
- Children: Adriana Castillo
- Grandparents: Emmett Capwell; Adriana Wayne
- Aunts and uncles: Grant Capwell
- First cousins: Madeline Capwell; Courtney Capwell
- Other relatives: Samantha Capwell

Wedding of Capwell and Castillo, 1988

Cruz Castillo
- Santa Barbara character
- Portrayed by: A Martinez
- First appearance: Episode 11; August 13, 1984
- Last appearance: Episode 2050; September 11, 1992
- Created by: Bridget and Jerome Dobson
In-universe information
- Occupation: Secret agent Detective with the Santa Barbara Police Department; Partner in the Last Resort Detective Agency
- Parents: Rafael Castillo; Carmen Castillo
- Siblings: Carmen Castillo; Rafe Castillo (half-brother); Ric Castillo (half-brother)
- Spouse: Santana Andrade (1986); Eden Capwell (1988–1992)
- Children: B.J. Walker; Chip Capwell Castillo; Adriana Castillo

Eden Capwell and Cruz Castillo are fictional characters and a supercouple from the American daytime drama Santa Barbara. Eden was portrayed by American actress Marcy Walker from September 28, 1984 to August 9, 1991, and Cruz was portrayed by actor A Martinez from August 13, 1984 to September 11, 1992. While producers were at first unsure about pairing the blonde, white Eden with a character of Mexican descent, the fans eagerly adopted the new couple, and they quickly became Santa Barbara's most popular couple.

== Storyline ==
This couple's subsequent relationship was not apparent when their characters first appeared. (Eden, having been away from Santa Barbara for some time, made a dramatic entrance by parachuting onto the grounds of the Capwell estate.) As a matter of fact, Cruz and Eden did not seem to like each other very much in their early scenes from 1984. Not only were their differing ethnic and socio-economic backgrounds a strong factor in their initial dislike, but Eden and Cruz were attracted to other characters on the show. During this period, Cruz was pursuing his childhood friend, Santana Andrade, while Eden was showing interest in Lionel Lockridge.

When I arrived in the show, I was told that my character was supposed to be related to Warren Lockridge. I actually shot some scenes with him, but which did not bring through many things. In the scenes I played with A Martinez, on the contrary, immediately emerged an impression much stronger, an unexplainable chemistry that did not escape to anyone. Then, it came to both of us the idea to invent a love-story between our characters. The writers however hesitated for a long time to integrate in Santa Barbara a love-affair between this rich girl of the high society and a simple guy, raised in a poor Mexican family.

— Marcy Walker

However, Marcy Walker and A Martinez have been quoted as saying that they pushed the Eden and Cruz angle, as it was not part of the original writer's plans to pair the two. Eventually the actors won out and Santa Barbara's first supercouple was born. By mid-1985, only a year after the debut of the show, Eden and Cruz were fan favorites and a great deal of the viewers were rooting for this couple. The racial issues were touched upon very intelligently by the writers, acknowledged, yet not ridiculed.

As Cruz and Eden began dating during this period, their differing ethnic and socio-economic backgrounds, became major hurdles in their relationship. Both Eden's father, C.C. Capwell and Cruz's mother, Carmen, did not approve of the relationship for these reasons. Despite this, Cruz and Eden continued with their relationship and were soon engaged. However, as with any supercouple, more problems ensued that jeopardized the relationship. One involved the investigation into Channing's murder (Eden's older brother).

Cruz, who was a detective on the Santa Barbara Police Force at the time, re-opened the case when new evidence on other possible suspects appeared. This caused a great deal of tension in the relationship since Cruz often found himself struggling between his duty as a police officer and his loyalty to Eden. The loyalty was challenged when the murder investigation leads to Eden's mother, Sophia, as the prime suspect. However, Eden and Cruz were able to reconcile their differences and together, they worked to get Sophia (who killed Channing by accident) a lenient jail sentence.

Soon, Eden and Cruz became engaged and a wedding date was set. However, more events would postpone the wedding and damage the relationship. A fire at the Capwell Hotel stopped Cruz and Eden's first attempt at marriage in 1985. Later on in the year, Eden's father, C.C. suffered a stroke and slipped into a coma. Eden is thrust into the leadership position of the Capwell family (much to her older brother Mason's chagrin). The future wedding is postponed even further when an ambitious business man, by the name of Kirk Cranston, comes to town. He helped Eden run the family business, but had a strong romantic interest in Eden as well.

I am quite simply dismayed by his [Cruz's] popularity! He does not have anything heroic. And, as a police officer, he is perfectly ineffective. In fact, he solves only few enigmas and, when he tries to protect somebody, the unhappy one is found or dead or wounded. Actually, so that a soap continues to live, it is necessary that the things turn badly and that reality thwarts the intentions. But I find astonishing that the public has such respect for a police officer in front of who the Inspector Clouseau of The Pink Panther would seem to be a genius.

— A Martinez

In late 1985, Cruz and Eden are torn even further apart when an attempt to kill Eden's comatose father was made during their engagement party. Gina, the estranged current wife of C.C., devised an elaborate plan to unplug C.C's life-support and frame Eden for the crime. The attempt on C.C.'s life was unsuccessful, but Gina's attempt at casting suspicion on Eden paid off. Eden, who had been drugged by Gina on the day of the incident, could not be certain of her innocence and began distancing herself from Cruz, who was called to investigate. Kirk Cranston used this moment to befriend Eden. He offered to become Eden's alibi. And shortly thereafter, he proposed marriage to Eden. Eden, feeling the pressure of an impending police investigation with her fiancé at the helm, agreed to marry Kirk. After a couple of months, Eden was cleared of any suspicion of her father's attempt murder, but the damage to her relationship with Cruz had been done.

In 1986, after C.C. came out of his coma, Cruz, would also find himself in a loveless marriage to another person. He married Santana Andrade, a childhood family friend of the Castillo clan. He married Santana to help her obtain custody of her son, Brandon, and because Eden was pregnant with Kirk's child. This was a ploy perpetuated by C.C. (who was the boy's current legal custodian) to keep Cruz away from Eden. He felt that Cruz's presence was a threat to Eden's marriage to Kirk, which he endorsed. Later on in the year, Eden's marriage to Kirk falls apart. Kirk, enraged with suspicious and jealousy of Eden's lingering feelings for Cruz, made several attempts on her life. With Cruz's help, Eden gets rid of Kirk, but not before he lures her to a shark aquarium for one last attempt on her life. After, the shootout and Eden's escape from the aquarium, Kirk Cranston is presumed dead. However, he would reappear in later episodes to cause Cruz and Eden more torment.

Cruz's marriage would end when Santana became addicted to cocaine. Gina got Santana hooked by switching her allergy medication for cocaine. Gina, who originally had custody of Brandon before C.C., did this as an attempt to get the child. During this time, Santana begins an illicit affair with the current District Attorney, Keith Timmons. Santana was eventually sent away to an insane asylum and the marriage ends in divorce. After a time Cruz and Eden were briefly reunited, until their love was tested, once again, by another blast from Cruz's past, Victoria Lane. Cruz ended up fathering a child by Tori and while the couple were again separated they eventually reconciled again. Soon afterwards though, Eden was presumed dead in Utah, but she is in fact held captive by Cain and the evil, long lost Capwell daughter, Elena. Cruz mourned Eden, but eventually learned that she was still alive. Unfortunately Eden is paralyzed, but after many sorrow-filled scenes, the pair are reunited. Cruz is arrested for the murder of Elena, however, which begins more torment for the star-crossed pair. Eventually, it was discovered that Elena committed suicide, in which she was trained by Kirk. Despite teaching her how to die, Kirk was unable to do the same when faced police, and was taken into custody. Cruz was cleared, and the couple were married at the Pebble Creek Inn (Stonepine Estate in Carmel Valley, California was used to depict the Inn). In turn of the century costumes, the couple finally says "I do" in style and the wedding goes off without a hitch on April 1, 1988.

It is not happily ever after for the Castillos, though. Shortly after the wedding, a rapist is on the loose in Santa Barbara and Eden is one of his victims. The storyline was widely acclaimed, and Marcy Walker won a 1989 Daytime Emmy for her emotional performance. A Martinez was also hailed for his performances as Cruz struggled to forgive himself for not protecting his beloved Eden, while also trying to catch the rapist. It is not long after the rape that the Castillos discover that Eden is pregnant. On January 1, 1989 the couple has their first child, Adriana Castillo. This joyous event is overshadowed when the baby is stolen by the rapist, Eden's obstetrician, Zach.

After Walker returns from maternity leave (she gave birth to son Taylor), she returns to Santa Barbara where Cruz and Eden search for their missing daughter. The search leaves them to the oft-visited site of Paris, France (Eden is often said to be there when Marcy Walker is off screen) where the pair are finally reunited with their bundle of joy. This Paris location filming marks another first, as the huge popularity of the show in France has made a French publication offer to help fund the production of the show filming overseas. (These episodes will never air in France on the French channel that carries the show, as it was canceled there prior to these episodes airing, but French fans were able to pick them up on satellite channels from Germany). Eden and Cruz return to Santa Barbara briefly, and then head to Mexico in search of Cruz's father.

Upon their return home, the couple faces another challenge when RObert Barr, portrayed by Roscoe Born, arrives in town and threatens to take over the Capwell faily business. It is revealed that Robert and Eden were previously romantically involved, placing considerable strain on Cruz and Eden's marriage. After months of conflict and emotional turmoil, Cruz and Eden eventually reconcile at their wedding site in Pebble Creek. Following their reconciliation, Cruz and Eden enjoy a period of happiness together. However, their relationship faces further complications when Cruz is kidnapped by a pasha seeking to obtain the powers of a talisman in his possession, along with several other unexpected developments.

It is when Marcy Walker leaves the show for primetime that the great love story of Cruz, and Eden comes to an end. While the show could have chosen many ways to convey this, they chose to have Eden suffer from multiple personality disorder, and to leave town, only to return as an alter-ego and leave again. Her character of Eden is last seen falling from a cliff, although her alter-egos are seen after that. Again, A Martinez shines as Cruz grieves for his love once again. Eventually the story is given closure as divorce papers are received by Cruz and Cruz himself leaves town.

== Reception ==
Kim Zimmer, who joined Santa Barbara as Jodie Walker in 1992, found that fan reaction to the couple was so strong that her pairing with Cruz was dismissed. She lamented, "The thought of super couples never bothered me, but I'm having a problem with it now because Eden and Cruz were such a super couple that anyone else who comes on the show with designs on Cruz gets hate mail. I can't stress how hard it is for me to read mail from people who have such tunnel vision about the Eden/Cruz thing that they won't accept another woman in his life. With super couples, they don't let that die."

== See also ==
- List of supercouples
