= Todd McKee =

American actor (born 1963)

- Born: November 7, 1963 (age 62); Kentfield, California, U.S.
- Education: University of Southern California
- Occupation: Actor
- Years active: 1984–present

Todd McKee (born November 7, 1963) is an American actor. He is best known for his roles as Ted Capwell on the NBC soap opera Santa Barbara and as Jake Maclaine on the CBS soap opera The Bold and the Beautiful. In the late 1990s, McKee began a career as a financial adviser for Merrill Lynch.

== Filmography ==
=== Television series ===
Year	Title	Role	Notes
1984–1989	Santa Barbara	Ted Capwell	611 episodes
1990–92; 2007–13; 2015–16; 2018–19	The Bold and the Beautiful	Jake Maclaine	211+ episodes
1994	Breach of Conduct	Lt. Keith Waite	Television film
1994	Models Inc.	Mike McClain	Episode: "Of Models and Men"
1995	Robin's Hoods	Jeff	Episode: "If Looks Could Kill"
1996	Diagnosis: Murder	Lt. Kincaid	Episode: "The Murder Trade"
1996	Bedtime	Rick	Episode: 1
1996	Moloney		Episode: "All the King's Horses"
1997	Melrose Place	Kenny Jackson	Episode: "Better Homes and Condos"
1998	To Have & to Hold	Chip	Episode: "Hope You Had the Time of Your Wife"
2001	V.I.P.	Neal Berens	Episode: "Val Under Covers"
2001	CSI: Crime Scene Investigation	Bradley Walden	Episode: "Strip Strangler"
2002	7th Heaven	Doctor	Episode: "Peer Pressure"

=== Film ===
Year	Title	Role	Notes
1997	Blade Boxer	Jonathan Carter	Direct-to-video
2000	The Perfect Tenant	Frank	
2000	Teacher's Pet	Jim Sykes	
2000	Nothing But the Truth	David Fitzsimmons	
2001	Guardian	Aaron Lichtmann	
2008	Feast 2: Sloppy Seconds	Family man	Direct-to-video

== Awards and nominations ==
Year	Award	Category	Nominated work	Result
1984	6th Youth in Film Awards	Best Young Supporting Actor in a Daytime or Nighttime Drama	Santa Barbara	Nominated
1992	8th Soap Opera Digest Awards	Outstanding Younger Lead Actor: Daytime	The Bold and the Beautiful	Nominated
