= Judith McConnell =

American actress

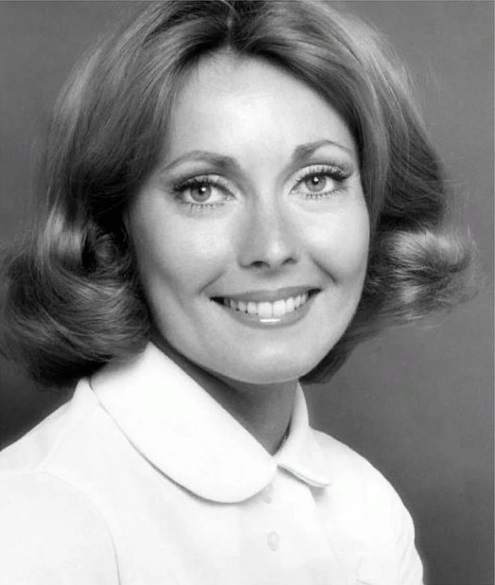
- Born: Pittsburgh, Pennsylvania, U.S.
- Education: Carnegie Mellon University
- Years active: 1967-present
- Known for: Sophia Wayne Capwell in Santa Barbara
- Title: Miss Pennsylvania 1965

Judith McConnell is an American actress, best known for her role as Sophia Wayne Capwell on the TV series Santa Barbara, on which she appeared from 1984 to 1993.

== Early life and education ==
McConnell was born in Pittsburgh, Pennsylvania, and attended Carnegie Mellon University. She was Miss Pennsylvania for 1965 and competed in the 1966 Miss America pageant.

== Career ==
McConnell started her acting career in an episode of Judd, for the Defense (1967). Around the same time, she played Yeoman Tankris in Star Trek episode "Wolf in the Fold" (also 1967). She also appeared in two episodes of Get Smart, including "The King Lives?" (January 1968) as Princess Marta and later played short-term recurring roles on The Beverly Hillbillies (1969) as a bank secretary and Green Acres (as Eb's girlfriend) in the 1970-71 season. McConnell played Betsy Nicholls in an episode of Dragnet (1970) and appeared twice in the TV series Mannix.

From June 1973 to September 1975, McConnell played Nurse Augusta McLeod on General Hospital. Her character murdered longtime GH villain Phil Brewer which aired December 6, 1974 after he threatened her in regards to her unborn child fathered by the married Dr. Peter Taylor. Moving to New York, McConnell took on the role of scheming Valerie Conway on As the World Turns from 1976 to 1979, and later played socialite Miranda Bishop on Another World. A brief role as spy Eva Vasquez on One Life to Live came about in 1983, after which she moved back to Los Angeles to replace Rosemary Forsyth on Santa Barbara in the role of Dominic who turned out to be long-believed dead Sophia Capwell.

After Santa Barbara ended, McConnell guest-starred on numerous television series and appeared in some commercials and films. She appeared in the Sliders episode (5.15) "To Catch a Slider" (1999), in commercials for IKEA and Walgreens, in The Weather Man (2005), and as the elderly auctioneer in The Purge: Anarchy.

== Filmography ==
=== Film ===
| Year | Title | Role | Notes |
|---|---|---|---|
| 1971 | The Brotherhood of Satan | Phyllis Meadows | |
| 1973 | The Doll Squad | Elizabeth White | |
| 1974 | How to Seduce a Woman | Ramona | |
| 1974 | The Thirsty Dead | Claire | |
| 2005 | The Weather Man | Lauren | |
| 2014 | The Purge: Anarchy | Old Elegant Woman | |
| 2016 | The Darkness | Trish | |

=== Television ===
| Year | Title | Role | Notes |
|---|---|---|---|
| 1967 | Judd, for the Defense | Eve | Episode: "Tempest in a Texas Town" |
| 1967 | Star Trek | Yeoman Tankris | Episode: "Wolf in the Fold" |
| 1967–1968 | Days of Our Lives | Miss Evans / Miss Douglas | 3 episodes |
| 1968 | The Wild Wild West | Amanada Vale | Episode: "The Night of the Death Masks" |
| 1968 | The Outsider | Dorothy Johnson | Episode: "One Long-Stemmed American Beauty" |
| 1968–1970 | Get Smart | Stewardess / Princess Marta | 2 episodes |
| 1969 | The Beverly Hillbillies | Jeanne Leeds | 4 episodes |
| 1970 | Dragnet | Karen Fields / Betsy Nichols | 2 episodes |
| 1970 | Marcus Welby, M.D. | Claudia Moran / Lee Simmons | 2 episodes |
| 1970 | The Name of the Game | Elaine | Episode: "Why I Blew Up Dakota" |
| 1970–1971 | Mayberry R.F.D. | Pamela Bennington | 2 episodes |
| 1970–1971 | Green Acres | Darlene Wheeler | 6 episodes |
| 1970–1972 | Mannix | J.C. Casey / Verna | 2 episodes |
| 1971 | The Carol Burnett Show | Secretary | Episode: "Paul Lynde/Nanette Fabray" |
| 1971 | The D.A. | Jill | Episode: "The People vs. Drake" |
| 1971 | Cannon | Donna Woodward | Episode: "Death Chain" |
| 1971 | The Chicago Teddy Bears | Irene Wellington | Episode: "Mr. Suave" |
| 1972 | Gidget Gets Married | Ann | Television film |
| 1972 | O'Hara, U.S. Treasury | Jane | Episode: "Operation: Mr. Felix" |
| 1972 | Love, American Style | Mabel | Episode: "Love and the Lovely Evening" |
| 1972 | The Mod Squad | Betty Saunders | Episode: "Sanctuary" |
| 1972 | The Streets of San Francisco | Officer Evelyn Hennick | Episode: "Act of Duty" |
| 1975 | General Hospital | Augusta McLeod | 2 episodes |
| 1975 | The Blue Knight | Carla | Episode: "Triple Threat" |
| 1976 | Harry O | Sylvia Applequist | Episode: "The Mysterious Case of Lester and Dr. Fong" |
| 1976–1979 | As the World Turns | Valerie Conway | 15 episodes |
| 1980–1981 | Another World | Miranda Bishop | 86 episodes |
| 1983 | One Life to Live | Eva Vasquez | 3 episodes |
| 1984–1993 | Santa Barbara | Sophia Capwell | 1,028 episodes |
| 1995 | Virus | Ms. Hopper | Television film |
| 1995 | Alien Nation: Body and Soul | Elinor | Television film |
| 1995 | Baywatch Nights | Miss Belda | Episode: "Blues Boy" |
| 1996 | Every Woman's Dream | Barbara Wells | Television film |
| 1998 | Melrose Place | Woman at Hotel | Episode: "Divorce Dominican Style" |
| 1999 | Beverly Hills, 90210 | Pat Sorem | Episode: "Slipping Away" |
| 1999 | Sliders | Clerk / Sylvia | 2 episodes |
| 2004 | JAG | Bank Manager | Episode: "Persian Gulf" |
| 2005 | Detective | Mrs. Ernst | Television film |
| 2007 | Passions | Bad Witch #2 | 4 episodes |
| 2012 | Zombie Whisperer | Jacki | Episode: "Jacki & Cujo" |
| 2014 | Mistresses | Waspy Woman | Episode: "An Affair to Surrender" |
| 2014–2019 | The Bay | Melody Garrett | 14 episodes |
| 2015 | Cougar Town | Diane | 2 episodes |
| 2015 | Criminal Minds | Pat Sullivan | Episode: "Beyond Borders" |
| 2016 | The People v. O. J. Simpson | Socialite Woman #1 | Episode: "The Race Card" |
| 2019 | I'm Sorry | Becky | Episode: "These Are My Fingers" |

== Awards and nominations ==
| Year | Award | Category | Nominated work | Result |
|---|---|---|---|---|
| 1986 | Soap Opera Digest Awards | Outstanding Supporting Actress: Daytime | Santa Barbara | Nominated |
