= Marcy Walker =

American youth minister and former actress

- Born: Marcy Lynn Walker; November 26, 1961 (age 64); Paducah, Kentucky, U.S.
- Other name: Marcy Smith
- Occupations: Actress, minister
- Years active: 1980–2005
- Spouses: Stephen Ferrera (m. 1983; div. 1983) Billy Warlock (m. 1985; div. 1987) Stephan Collins (m. 1990; div. 1991) Robert Primrose (m. 1997; div. 1999) Doug Smith (m. 1999)
- Children: 1

Marcy Lynn Walker (born November 26, 1961), also known as Marcy Smith, is an American youth minister and former actress known for her television appearances on daytime soap operas. Her most famous roles are those of Liza Colby on All My Children, which she played from 1981 to 1984 and 1995 to 2005, and as Eden Capwell on Santa Barbara from 1984 to 1991.

== Personal life ==
Walker was born in Paducah, Kentucky and traveled the world during her youth. She lived in Lancaster, California from 1975 to 1978 and attended Antelope Valley High School there. After her junior year, she moved to Troy, Illinois and attended Triad High School where she was active in the drama club and graduated from there in 1979.

Marcy has one son, Taylor, from her third husband, Stephan Collins. In 1999, she married Doug Smith and goes by the name Marcy Smith in her private life. At one point, she was romantically involved with former All My Children costar Michael E. Knight, who played Tad Martin on the show. She was briefly engaged to actor Bronson Pinchot during the mid-1980s. From 1985 to 1987, she was married to actor Billy Warlock.

== Acting background ==
In 1981, Walker was cast in her first acting job on a daytime serial, as Liza Colby on the ABC Television soap opera All My Children, making her debut on November 13. (She had turned down an offer to join the cast of As the World Turns.) She was honored with two Outstanding Supporting Actress Daytime Emmy nominations in 1983 and 1984. After a three-year run, she decided to leave the show for other opportunities. Walker's role was then recast with Alice Haining.

In 1984, Walker created another soap opera role, in the form of Eden Capwell, on Santa Barbara. Her character was partnered with A Martinez's character Cruz Castillo. They became one of the period's most popular supercouples. For this role, Walker received three more Daytime Emmy nominations, this time in the category of Outstanding Lead Actress. She won the award in 1989 for an storyline in which her character was beaten and raped. She left the show in 1991.

In 1993, she started playing the role of Tangie Hill on Guiding Light. While the role was created specifically for Walker, the character didn't catch on with the audience and Walker declined to renew her contract. Walker left the show in mid-1995, before making a comeback appearance as Liza Colby on All My Children in September of that year. In 2001, she was nominated for another Outstanding Lead Actress Daytime Emmy award.

On August 5, 2004, The Wilton Bulletin, a Connecticut newspaper, reported that Walker had intention to become a full-time children's ministry director at Hope Church in Wilton, Connecticut, upon the expiration of her ABC Television contract the following September. The actress had been interviewed for the article on July 20, 2004. On August 20, 2004, Dan J Kroll of soapcentral.com reported that Walker's All My Children contract had not been renewed. Her farewell appearance on All My Children aired on September 28, 2004.

The exit of Liza Colby occurred amid rumor that Walker would return to the show on a recurring basis. This rumor was fueled by the fact that her exit was very open-ended. She was not killed off, like some notable fan favorites like Jesse Hubbard, played by Darnell Williams, but rather assumed a new identity. Her character simply decided to take her daughter to live out of reach from her controlling ex-husband Adam Chandler, played by David Canary.

According to Soap Opera Digest magazine, Walker was at first hesitant to go on a recurring basis, but later warmed to the idea. In December 2004, the writers created a scene where Liza appeared making a phone call. Walker appeared again in January 2005, when her character assisted Babe Carey Chandler and Jamie Martin, in their attempt to flee from Adam's wrath. The characters of Babe and Jamie were played by Alexa Havins and Justin Bruening.

Former head writer Megan McTavish spoke to the soap media and publicly thanked Walker for working without a contract, but also hinted that she did not intend for Liza to return to the show any time soon. However, in 2009, the character of Liza returned, albeit played this time by actress Jamie Luner.

After Walker left All My Children, she decided to accept a position in Christian ministry based in Huntersville, North Carolina.

In addition to her work with daytime soap operas, Walker has starred in several movies of the week, including The Return of Desperado, Bar Girls, Midnight's Child, and Terror In the Shadows.

Walker did not participate in the All My Children reunion that was featured on the February 2, 2017 edition of the Hallmark Channel's Home & Family show. However, Home & Family did utilize footage of Walker with Michael E. Knight from the All My Children storyline where Knight's Tad Martin character had affairs with both Liza Colby and her mother Marian (played by Jennifer Bassey).

Walker has been confirmed to appear at the Santa Barbara 40th Anniversary event to be held in Burbank, California on August 2-5, 2024.

Walker and her Santa Barbara co-star A Martinez reunited on June 7, 2026, for a special "In Conversation" global livestream. The event was a fundraiser to support Walker as she faces a significant health challenge. On-demand access to the two-hour livestream replay is available.

=== Filmography ===
List of television credits
Year	TV Movie/Series	Role
1995	Terror in the Shadows	Rebecca/Christine
1996	Sudden Terror: The Hijacking of School Bus #17	Lieutenant Kathy Leone
1993–1995	Guiding Light	Tangie Hill
1993	Nick's Game	Maxine "Max" Clift
1992	Overexposed	Ann Demski
1992	Midnight's Child	Kate
1991	Palace Guard	Christy Cooper
1990	Babies	Cindy
1990	Bar Girls	Melanie Roston
1990	Perry Mason: The Case of the Desperate Deception	Marie Ramsey
1988	The Return of Desperado	Caitlin Jones
1984–1991	Santa Barbara	Eden Capwell Castillo
1981–1984, 1995–2004, 2005	All My Children	Liza Colby
1980	Life on the Mississippi	Emmeline

List of film credits
Year	Film	Role
1994	Talking About Sex	Rachel Parsons
1985	Hot Resort	Franny

=== Awards and honors ===
List of awards and honors
Year	Award	Role (Show)
2001	Daytime Emmy Nomination, Outstanding Leading Actress	Liza Colby (All My Children)
1997	Soap Opera Award Outstanding Supporting Actress	Liza Colby (All My Children)
1989	Daytime Emmy Winner, Outstanding Leading Actress	Eden Capwell (Santa Barbara)
1989	Daytime Emmy Nomination, Outstanding Leading Actress	Eden Capwell (Santa Barbara)
1988	Daytime Emmy Nomination, Outstanding Leading Actress	Eden Capwell (Santa Barbara)
1987	Daytime Emmy Nomination, Outstanding Leading Actress	Eden Capwell (Santa Barbara)
1984	Daytime Emmy Nomination, Outstanding Supporting Actress	Liza Colby (All My Children)
1983	Daytime Emmy Nomination, Outstanding Supporting Actress	Liza Colby (All My Children)

== Ministry background ==
In early 2005, after juggling two roles, one as an actress and another working part-time in her home church, Hope Church, in Wilton, Connecticut, she decided to pursue Christian youth ministry on a full-time basis. In 2005, she began working at Lake Forest Church in Huntersville, North Carolina as their Director of Children's Ministry. On July 22, 2010, she announced on her Facebook page that she was resigning her position on staff with the church to take a position at another Charlotte-area church. The Mission Pastor of her former church once said "Marcy is the coolest." In 2011, Marcy joined the staff of LifeChurch.tv at their Edmond, OK campus.

== External ==
- Marcy Walker at IMDb
- Biography of Marcy Walker
