= Bridget and Jerome Dobson =

American television screenwriter and artists

- Occupation: Television screenwriting duo
- Known for: General Hospital (head writers); As the World Turns (head writers); Guiding Light (head writers); Santa Barbara (TV series) Creators and head writers
- Bridget Dobson
- Birth Name: Bridget Hursley
- Born: September 1, 1938
- Died: January 3, 2024 (aged 85)
- Parents: Frank and Doris Hursley
- Jerome Dobson
- Spouse: Bridget Hursley (m. 1961)

Bridget (née Hursley; September 1, 1938 – January 3, 2024) and Jerome Dobson were an American husband-and-wife duo of television award-winning screenwriters and artists.

Through their company Dobson Productions, they are notable for their work as the head writing team for several soap operas, including General Hospital, Guiding Light and As the World Turns and the creators and head writers of the NBC soap opera Santa Barbara.

Bridget Dobson was the daughter of Frank and Doris Hursley, television soap opera creators and screenwriters, best known for the series General Hospital. Bridget and Jerome Dobson married in 1961.

== Career ==
Bridget Hursley attended Stanford University and began writing scripts for General Hospital on February 10, 1969, and Jerome joined her soon after. They later became head writers from December 31, 1973 to July 4, 1975.

In 1975, the Dobsons were hired as the head writers for the long-running CBS Daytime soap opera Guiding Light. They spent the rest of the 1970s at Guiding Light where they created alluring nurse Rita Stapleton (who became the show's heroine for the remainder of the 1970s), the rich, upper class Spaulding family in 1977 (who would remain one of the show's core families until the show's cancellation in 2009), and wrote the infamous storyline of Holly Norris Bauer's rape by her own husband Roger Thorpe in 1979.

The Dobsons were hired by another Procter and Gamble soap opera, As the World Turns where, among other stories, they created the infamous character of James Stenbeck and also paired the characters of Tom and Margo.

== Santa Barbara ==
In 1984, Santa Barbara, the show created by the Dobsons for NBC, premiered. After years of working with both the network and the sponsor (Procter & Gamble) at earlier shows, the Dobsons had creative control of the show. The Dobsons attempted to create a richer canvas of character, including a Hispanic family and a romance between Latino Cruz Castillo and WASPy Eden Capwell. They also infused many stories and scripts with humor.

In 1988, a long running dispute between the Dobsons and NBC offices came to a head after the Dobsons tried several times to fire head writer, Anne Howard Bailey. Unbeknownst to the Dobsons, Bailey's contract contained a provision that only NBC could terminate her employment; when the Dobsons challenged that, NBC and New World Television, the production company, locked them out of their studio. The Dobsons responded by filing a $53 million lawsuit against NBC and New World Television. That same year, when claiming Santa Barbara's Outstanding Daytime Drama Emmy, a bittersweet Bridget Dobson – who made it to the winners' podium first – taunted, "Though New World Television locked me out of the studio, they couldn't lock me out of the Emmys!" Ironically, Santa Barbara received its very first Emmy award for Outstanding Drama Series for material written by Bailey. By 1991 the case was settled out of court, and the Dobsons returned to the show they created. The show ended in 1993. In 1995, the Dobsons moved to Atlanta, where Bridget transitioned into a career in painting. More than sixty of her paintings were featured in a solo traveling museum tour. Bridget Dobson's series of fine china, crystal, and giftware—sold by the company Bridget Dobson Studios—was unveiled in 2006 in New York City. Jerome Dobson (as Jerome John Dobson) published a novel in 2018.

Bridget Dobson died on January 3, 2024, at the age of 85.

== Awards and nominations ==
Daytime Emmy Awards

Nominations

- (1976 & 1978; Best Writing; Guiding Light)
- (1987; Best Writing; Santa Barbara)

Writers Guild of America Award

Wins

- (1980 season; Guiding Light)
- (1992 season; Santa Barbara)

Nominations

- (1993 season; Santa Barbara)
