= Santa Barbara (TV series) =

American television soap opera (1984–1993)

- Genre: Soap opera
- Created by: Bridget and Jerome Dobson
- Starring: Series cast
- Theme music composer: Joe Harnell
- Country of origin: United States of America
- Original language: English
- No. of seasons: 9
- No. of episodes: 2,137

Production
- Executive producer: See here
- Production locations: NBC Studios; Burbank, California
- Running time: 60 minutes
- Production companies: Dobson Productions; New World Television

Original release
- Network: NBC
- Release: July 30, 1984 – January 15, 1993

Santa Barbara is an American television soap opera that aired on NBC from July 30, 1984, to January 15, 1993. The show revolves around the eventful lives of the wealthy Capwell family of Santa Barbara, California. Other prominent families featured on the soap were the rival Lockridge family, and the more modest Andrade and Perkins families.

The serial was produced by Dobson Productions and New World Television, which also served as distributor for the show in international markets. Santa Barbara was the first series for New World Television.

Santa Barbara aired in the United States at 3:00 p.m. Eastern (2:00 p.m. Central) on NBC in the same time slot as General Hospital on ABC and Guiding Light on CBS and right after Another World. Santa Barbara aired in over 40 countries around the world. It became the longest-running television series in Russia, airing there from 1992 to 2002. Santa Barbara won 24 Daytime Emmy Awards and was nominated 30 times for the same award. The show also won 18 Soap Opera Digest Awards and various other awards.

== Plot ==
The original plotline surrounded conflicts between the wealthy Capwell and Lockridge families. Stage legend and Oscar nominee Dame Judith Anderson received a great deal of publicity for headlining the cast as Lockridge matriarch Minx. John Cory of The New York Times wrote "a good soap opera has plot, plot and more plot" describing the myriad of "dramatic possibilities", "ideological/societal warfare" and predicting "bitterness along the blue collar versus country club divide."

A central plot around which many of the others revolve: the murder of Channing Capwell Jr. which takes place five years before the series begins. Joe Perkins has been jailed for the murder, paroled and returns to Santa Barbara determined to prove his innocence and renew his relationship with Kelly Capwell, sister of the victim.

One controversial storyline involved Eden being brutally raped, and later discovering that her assailant was her gynecologist Zack Kelton, who had examined her after her rape. Zack's portrayer, former Dallas cast member Leigh McCloskey, stated that he was uncomfortable with the storyline as he felt that women had enough concerns about visiting gynecologists.

In 1988 Libby Slate wrote for the Los Angeles Times, "Clearly, this is a show that is not afraid to take chances: Roles for deaf performers are a television rarity day or night" This was a reference to the character Sister Sarah, played by deaf actress Phyllis Frelich for 31 episodes.

Over the course of the soap, almost every major character would be accused of the murder of Channing Capwell Jr. or find his or her life involved in the incident in one way or another: from his illegitimate son to his mysterious, presumed-dead mother.

== Production ==
The series was launched on NBC with high promotion on July 30, 1984, while the 1984 Summer Olympics was airing on rival network ABC. However, creators and executive producers Bridget and Jerome Dobson tightened the show's cast among a handful of popular characters and proceeded to kill off or write out weaker links and supporting characters via a natural disaster and the "Carnation Killer" serial killer storyline. When the Lockridges staged a comeback in the early 1990s, the much younger Broadway and movie veteran Janis Paige assumed the part of Minx. The soap showed promise with an early Alexis Carrington-style villainess, Augusta Lockridge (Louise Sorel), but even though critics praised her performance, her storyline was suddenly dropped and Sorel left the show. She would return later on a recurring basis and signed a contract when the Lockridges were written back in as regular characters.

When a major earthquake hit Santa Barbara, core character Danny Andrade slept through the whole thing. Minx Lockridge was unfazed, saying that the 1984 Santa Barbara earthquake was nothing like the one in 1925. She was later locked in an empty sarcophagus. Luckily, her grandchildren were around to let her out and she escaped with merely a bruised ego.

The supercouple, Eden Capwell (Marcy Walker) and Cruz Castillo (A Martinez)

We think of having succeeded since we are today the only soap whose ratings increase unceasingly. The others stagnate or lose televiewers. We just have now to gain the head of the group. We have to reach this objective in seven years. However, our first purpose remains to tell attractive stories with rich characters to give pleasure to our public. The only way to get it: to still work harder by saving this marvellous team spirit which already saved us.

— Bridget and Jerome Dobson

Under new executive producer Jill Farren Phelps' tenure, most of the show revolved around Eden Capwell and Cruz Castillo. By concentrating on such popular characters as Cruz and Eden, C.C. Capwell and his wife Sophia, Mason Capwell and Julia Wainwright Capwell, Gina Blake, and Augusta and Lionel Lockridge, the program achieved critical acclaim as well as slowly but surely rising ratings. The show was famous for its comedic style and offbeat writing. For example, in the July 14, 1986, episode, former nun Mary Duvall McCormick (Harley Jane Kozak) was killed by a giant neon letter "C" (for "Capwell") atop the Capwell Hotel toppling on her while she was standing on the hotel roof during an argument (this was later referenced in the American Dad! episode "Homeland Insecurity"). Despite an irate letter-writing campaign by the show's fans (and an offer from the soap to come back), Kozak was reported as saying that she had "no desire to return to SB", or in fact, any other daytime soap. Another example from 1989 involved Greg Hughes (Paul Johansson) having a dream while unconscious about Mason and Julia being aliens and being taken to "The Capwell Zone". Also in 1988, Julia backs out of her wedding to Mason while at the altar giving their wedding vows, revealing to Father Michael she is in love with him and they make love.

In October 1987, the Dobsons were locked out of NBC studios after repeated attempts to fire the head writer, Anne Howard Bailey. Bridget Dobson said, "It was impossible for Anne Howard Bailey to get inside my head, and I could not get in her head. She has a darker view of life than I do; I think she thinks of me as Pollyanna, and I think of her as Darth Vader." The Dobsons sued, and were eventually allowed to return to the program in 1991, but ratings never recovered, even as the show won three Daytime Emmys in a row for Outstanding Drama Series.

== Cast and characters ==
Cast on Christmas 1989 Cruz Castillo, Mack Blake, Eden Capwell, Julia Wainwright, Mason Capwell, Sasha Schmidt, Augusta Lockridge, C.C. Capwell, Kelly Capwell

Following common daytime drama practice, over the years the producers of Santa Barbara recast original characters multiple times. By the end of the series, almost every original character had been recast, excluding only Eden Capwell and Cruz Castillo, Lionel, and Augusta. Out of those four, not one stayed with the show through the entire run. The characters of Kelly, C.C., and Santana had the highest number of recasts, four each. Some recasts proved successful, most notably Jed Allan (C.C. Capwell #4), Judith McConnell (Sophia Capwell #2) and Robin Mattson (Gina Blake DeMott #2), but many were upsetting to fans.

The first notable departure was Robin Wright, to focus on her film career following the success of The Princess Bride the previous year, ending her four-year run as the original Kelly Capwell, in 1988. Following Wright were the departures of Justin Deas in 1988, and Todd McKee as the original Ted Capwell, Lane Davies as Mason Capwell and Marcy Walker as Eden Capwell in 1991.

By 1992, most of the original characters had either been recast a few times or written out, and new characters arrived on the scene. Roscoe Born was cast in the dual roles of twin brothers Robert Barr and Quinn Armitage from 1989 to 1991. In 1990, Leonardo DiCaprio received a Best Young Actor in a Daytime Series Nomination at the 12th Youth in Film Awards for his appearance as a young Mason Capwell. After Zack Kelton's death, McCloskey returned as a new character, district attorney Ethan Asher. Steven Nichols joined the cast as psychologist Skyler Gates in September 1992.

Louise Sorel was written out in 1991 because she did not want to have a romance with Dash Nichols, the man who had raped Augusta's sister Julia. Eden, Cruz, and most of the Lockridges had been written out while new characters played by stars from other shows such as Kim Zimmer, Jack Wagner, and Sydney Penny took up most of the airtime. Nicolas Coster had returned after a 2½-year absence but his character disappeared soon after as Coster could not come to terms over the lack of storyline he had gotten after such promise when he came back. By the time Coster had resolved the issues and returned permanently, Louise Sorel was on her way out, and Lionel was paired in a romance with C.C.'s former wife, Gina.

The final episode aired in January 1993. The only remaining original actor from the pilot was Margarita Cordova as the faithful Capwell housekeeper Rosa Andrade, although many of the original characters remained, including C.C., Sophia, Kelly, Mason, Ted, Warren Lockridge, Lionel, Gina, and Minx. In the finale, Sophia and C.C. Capwell moved towards a reconciliation, Kelly found love with Connor McCabe, and at Warren and BJ's wedding, unbalanced Andie Klein aimed a gun at the crowd; however, she was quickly disarmed and carried away by Connor. This was followed by a roll-call list of the cast and crew. The final shot consisted of executive producer Paul Rauch standing in front of the camera, smashing a cigar under his shoe, and walking away.

== Crew history ==
During the first three years of the show, the main crew of Santa Barbara stayed the same, with the Dobsons taking on a double duty as both head writer and executive producer. Jeffrey Hayden served as co-executive producer during the first year, and Mary-Ellis Bunim took over after him. In 1987, after the Dobsons were abruptly fired, associate head writer Charles Pratt Jr. received head writing status and Anne Howard Bailey joined him as co-head writer until 1989, when Sheri Anderson took over that duty.

Jill Farren Phelps was hired from the beginning of the production as the music director. In 1987, she took over as executive producer until 1990 when she was replaced by John Conboy, although there was a five-month transition period where both were credited. In 1990, Pratt was replaced by another associate writer, Maralyn Thoma, but her tenure was cut short when the Dobsons finally settled in court and returned to the series. Shortly before the Dobsons returned, Conboy was let go and Paul Rauch was brought on as executive producer. The Dobsons left their head writing duties in 1992, when Pam Long was hired as the show's final head writer.

=== Executive producers ===
Name(s)
Bridget and Jerome Dobson and Jeffrey Hayden
Bridget and Jerome Dobson and Charles Pratt, Sr.
Bridget and Jerome Dobson and Mary-Ellis Bunim
Bridget and Jerome Dobson
Jill Farren Phelps
Jill Farren Phelps and John Conboy
John Conboy
Paul Rauch and Bridget and Jerome Dobson

=== Head writers ===
Name(s)
Bridget and Jerome Dobson
Anne Howard Bailey and Charles Pratt Jr.
Charles Pratt Jr.
Sheri Anderson and Maralyn Thoma
Sheri Anderson, Samuel D. Ratcliffe, and Maralyn Thoma
Samuel D. Ratcliffe and Maralyn Thoma
Bridget and Jerome Dobson
Pamela K. Long

== Ratings history ==
NBC usually pitted Santa Barbara against General Hospital on ABC and Guiding Light on CBS, both of which enjoyed high ratings at the time in the same time slot across all markets. When NBC canceled the long-running soap Search for Tomorrow in 1986, it launched its "NBC Daytime... It Will Excite You" campaign, which promoted their three-hour block of serials starting with Days of Our Lives, followed by Another World, and ending with Santa Barbara in most markets across the U.S. However, some markets chose to air Santa Barbara in a mid-morning timeslot, taking it out of competition with other soaps.

Although Santa Barbara enjoyed considerable worldwide popularity, it never achieved the same heights in the United States. In its debut (1984–1985) season, it finished in 11th place and 3.4, and edged up to 10th and 4.2 the next year. By 1987, however, it did begin to generate respectable numbers: it was still in 10th place, but achieved a 4.9 rating, the highest in the history of the show. (Incidentally, the 1987–1988 television season also proved to be the best ratings performance of the 1980s for NBC's daytime soap lineup, which had been in ratings trouble since the late 1970s.)

As quickly as the ratings rose for Santa Barbara, they fell just as quickly. After recording a 4.8 rating in the 1988–1989 season, the serial dropped a full ratings point the next season. Many of the stations airing the show began looking elsewhere for programming and began preempting Santa Barbara in favor of other shows. Some dropped the program altogether while others moved it to either an earlier time slot, such as the open 10:00 a.m. hour that NBC gave back to the affiliates in 1991 while some stations even moved the program to late night. In September 1992, with ratings barely hovering above a 3.0, NBC decided to rework its daytime schedule. The network announced that Santa Barbara would be cancelled at the midway point of the 1992–93 season, with the final episode airing January 15, 1993. NBC would then give the 3:00 p.m. hour back to its affiliates, and in exchange for it they would take back the 12:00 p.m. hour, which they had not programmed since Generations (which aired in the 12:30 p.m. timeslot) was cancelled; NBC had already given back the 12:00 p.m. timeslot to its affiliates when Super Password ended its run in 1989. Santa Barbara saw its place on the schedule taken by two Reg Grundy Organisation-produced game shows, a revival of the company's earlier hit Scrabble and a new program based on the board game Scattergories. Shortly before the program ended, New World Television tried to shop Santa Barbara to other broadcast and cable networks, but failed to find one that would air the show.

== Broadcasts outside the United States ==
The show's popularity in France spun off a storyline in which Eden Capwell (Marcy Walker), Cruz Castillo (A Martinez), Kelly Capwell (Carrington Garland) and Ric Castillo (Peter Love) went to Paris to search for Eden's and Cruz's child.

- In Australia, the show aired from 1984 to 1994 on Network 10.
- In Brazil, the show aired from 1992 on Rede Manchete.
- In Austria, the show aired on ORF from 1996 to 1997.
- In Bulgaria, the show aired from 1994 to 1997.
- In Cameroon, the show aired in both French and English from 1990 to 1993, on CRTV. A neighbourhood in the capital city is named after the series.
- In Canada, in English-speaking Canada, Santa Barbara was carried by Western International Communications Ltd.-owned stations, CHCH-DT Hamilton, CICT-DT Calgary, CISA-DT Lethbridge, and CITV Edmonton while the final season was picked up by Baton Broadcast System owned CTV Television Network stations. The series also aired in French from 1989 to 1995 to TVA for broadcast in Quebec. The cessation of the series' dubbing in France in 1994 caused it to abruptly end its run in Quebec.
- In China, Hong Kong, India, Nepal, Pakistan, Philippines and South Korea, all episodes aired on Star Plus from 1990 to 1999.
- In Croatia the show aired from 1990 to 1998 on HRT 1.
- In Cyprus Santa Barbara aired in 1992 on LOGOS TV, and in 1993 on ANT1 until 2002 when it was completed.
- In the Czech Republic, it was the first American soap opera to air on television. It aired on Premiera TV.
- In Egypt, the show aired on DStv from 1996 to 1998.
- In Estonia, Santa Barbara aired on Kanal 2 and ended in 1999.
- In Finland, the show aired from 1994 to 1999 on Nelonen.
- In France, the show ran 1,044 30-minute long episodes (half an original episode) from 1985 to 1994 on TF1, and from 2000 to 2001 for 106 episodes on TF6.
- In Germany, the show aired from January 4 to March 28, 1988, under its original title weekdays at 7:20 p.m. on RTL. Fifty-two half-hour episodes were shown. On January 4, 1989, the show returned under its new name, California Clan and aired weekdays at 1:20 p.m. The show ended on October 17, 1997, after 2123 episodes. Various Christmas-themed episodes and a storyline that featured a crossover with Wheel of Fortune were cut. From 1998 to 1999 the tm3 channel repeated the first 250 episodes. Two CDs of the music from the show were released.
- In Morocco, the show aired on 2M in the early 1990s.
- In Greece, the show aired originally on ERT2 National TV (1989), starting from episode 76, and almost after a year it was transferred to MEGA Channel (aired from 1990 to 1995). After that it was transferred on STAR Channel (1996) with 150 episodes lost in the way, then in SKY TV (ALPHA) (1997), and at last in NEW Channel when it was cancelled, leaving the viewers with the final season's episodes (about a year's season episodes) unseen. The show never concluded due to failing ratings attributed to constant timeslot and channel changes.
- In Hong Kong, the show aired on ATV on its English network ATV World airing from 1989 to 1992.
- In the Netherlands, the show aired on RTL 4 from 1990 to 1991, and from 1992 to 1999.
- In India, the series was aired on Hong Kong-based satellite TV channel Star World from 1993 to 1997.
- In Ireland, the show aired on RTÉ One from 1984 to 1993.
- In Israel, the show aired briefly from 1995 to 1996 on Channel 2.
- In Italy, the show ran all 2,137 episodes from 1989 to 1990 on Rai Uno and from 1991 to 1999 on Rai 2.
- In Japan, the show aired entirely on Star World from 1990 to 1999, and also aired on SkyPerfecTV from 1991 to 1999.
- In Kenya, the show aired on KBC in the 1990s.
- In Lithuania, Santa Barbara aired on Tele-3.
- In Namibia, the show aired on NBC.
- In New Zealand, the show aired from 1988 to 1995 on TV One and TV2.
- In Norway, the show aired almost all episodes (except for the last two years) on TVNorge, from 1988 to 1998. The last four years the show ran the episodes were split in two half-hour episodes instead of the original hour-long episodes.
- In the Philippines, the show aired on GMA Network.
- In Poland, the show first aired from 1990 to 1992 on TVP2 (149 episodes), and was later bought by ATV1, aired from 1997 to 1999.
- In Puerto Rico, a non-incorporated territory of the United States, it aired on Channel 18, which at the time showed American series such as Remington Steele and others in English.
- In Romania, the show aired from 1994 to 2000 on TVR2.
- In Russia, the show was the first American program to air there after the collapse of the Soviet Union. It aired on Russia-1 from January 2, 1992, to April 5, 1999, and from February 21, 2000, to April 17, 2002. However, only 1,824 episodes were shown instead of the original 2,137 episodes. Moreover, the show began from episode 217 and ended on the 2,040th.
- In Slovenia, the show aired on POP TV from 1995 to 1998.
- In South Africa, the show aired entirely on SABC 3 from 1987 to 1998 and also on Bop TV.
- In Spain, TVE1 aired 520 episodes of the show from 1989 to 1991 when they refused to buy more episodes even though the show was very popular. However, Antena 3TV bought the rights to the show and continued airing it right after it concluded on TVE1 in 1991. It aired until 1996 with several breaks in between. The show never concluded due to failing ratings attributed to constant timeslot changes.
- In Sweden, the show first aired on Kanal 5 from 1991 to 1995, and briefly in 2000 on TV4.
- In Trinidad and Tobago, the show aired at 6:00 p.m., immediately before the main Panorama newscast at 7:00 p.m., throughout the late 1980s and early 1990s on national broadcaster TTT.
- In Turkey, the show aired on TRT-2 (TV-2) in the late 1980s (1986–1987).
- In Ukraine, the show was the first American program to air there after the collapse of the Soviet Union.
- In the United Kingdom, Santa Barbara was the first, and only, American daytime soap opera to be broadcast on ITV, the UK's first commercial television network. It was launched Monday, 7 September 1987, as part of a brand new mid-morning line-up, and it was intended to compete with the sunshine and glamour of the BBC's Australian soap opera, Neighbours. This was an unusual move, considering all of ITV's other daytime soap operas airing at the time were also from Australia. ITV bought the first 130 episodes of Santa Barbara and they were split into two 23-minute episodes (thus creating 260 editions), and initially aired across the network at 10:00-10:25, Monday to Friday. Less than a year later, by Friday, 15 July 1988, it was decided that the series had not been a success, and most ITV companies dropped the series. However, a few decided to keep the series going in their local area and they purchased the next 125 episodes (the rest of the first season), and they were broadcast in wildly varying timeslots between summer 1988 until May 1991, usually twice weekly. Satellite channel, Sky One, then picked it up from the second season, and it aired on from 25 February 1991 to 29 May 1992 in an afternoon slot, before briefly switching to the Sky Soap channel in 1994. Santa Barbara was mainly shown in the 23-minute format in the UK, although some ITV regions broadcast it in the hour-long format when burning off episodes during the early hours of the morning in the early '90s. The only American daytime soap opera that has successfully been broadcast in the UK is Sunset Beach, which aired on Channel 5 in the late '90s. Coincidentally, Sunset Beach was NBC's eventual replacement for Santa Barbara when it began in 1997.
- In Zimbabwe, the show aired on ZBC TV1 from 1991 to 1997.

The series enjoyed great success in France during the first seasons. It was broadcast at primetime at 7:00 p.m., attracting between 8 and 10 million viewers each evening.

== Reception ==
New York Times television critic and cultural news reporter John Corry enthusiastically describes Santa Barbara as "good trashy fun" recapping characters, plot twists and social themes, while surmising "the dramatic possibilities here are endless." He calls it "pretty good stuff" speculating "one wonders how Dame Judith, flicking her riding crop, is going to involve herself in what comes next" writing "It is probable that any number of viewers will tune in tomorrow to find out."

Tom Shales of The Washington Post wrote "As for whether Santa Barbara really is worse than the soaps that are doing well in the ratings, that's a tough call. On the surface, it doesn't appear to be inferior to all those other daytime offerings designed for people with too much time to kill."

In its first year, a reviewer for People Weekly wrote that the Santa Barbara TV series "could be the worst show on TV—ever".

Mark Dawidziak claimed in August 1984 that Santa Barbara was "a serial full of hammy acting, predictable story lines and atrocious dialogue".

== Awards ==
=== Daytime Emmy Award wins ===
==== Drama series and performer categories ====
Category	Recipient	Role(s)	Year(s)
Outstanding Drama Series			1988, 1989, 1990
Lead Actor	A Martinez	Cruz Castillo	1990
Lead Actress	Marcy Walker	Eden Capwell	1989
Supporting Actor	Justin Deas; Henry Darrow	Keith Timmons; Rafael Castillo	1988, 1989; 1990
Supporting Actress	Nancy Lee Grahn	Julia Wainwright Capwell	1989
Younger Actor	Justin Gocke	Brandon Capwell	1989
Guest Performer	John Wesley Shipp	Martin Ellis	1987

==== Other categories ====
- 1993 "Outstanding Achievement in Music Direction and Composition for a Drama Series"
- 1991 "Outstanding Drama Series Writing Team"
- 1991 "Outstanding Drama Series Directing Team"
- 1991 "Outstanding Achievement in Lighting Direction for a Drama Series"
- 1991 "Outstanding Achievement in Hairstyling for a Drama Series"
- 1990 "Outstanding Drama Series Directing Team"
- 1990 "Outstanding Achievement in Lighting Direction for a Drama Series"
- 1989 "Outstanding Drama Series Writing Team"
- 1989 "Outstanding Achievement in Makeup for a Drama Series"
- 1989 "Outstanding Achievement in Hairstyling for a Drama Series"
- 1988 "Outstanding Achievement in Music Direction and Composition for a Drama Series"
- 1987 "Outstanding Achievement in Music Direction and Composition for a Drama Series"
- 1985 "Outstanding Achievement in Graphics and Title Design"

=== Other awards ===
- Writers Guild of America Award for Television Daytime Serials (1991, 1992)
- Casting Society of America Artios Award (1990)

== Music ==
Joe Harnell composed the theme music for the show. Shortly afterwards, Dominic Messinger took on the position of composer and Music Director of the show. Music on the show was contemporary in style, with popular music themes composed and memorable original pop songs written specifically for each character and romantic couple, rather than the usual practice of soap operas of matching recorded cues to a scene.

Starting from the first episode, the show featured "If Ever You're in My Arms Again" by Peabo Bryson as a love theme for Joe Perkins and Kelly Capwell.

As of July 1988, Soap Opera Digest reported the most-requested love themes:

=== Cruz and Eden and Adriana ===
- All My Life – State of The Heart
- Nothing Can Take Me Away From You
- The Change in Me is You – James Dunne
- A Little Bit of Heaven (Turn Out The Lights) by Natalie Cole
- If I Believed – Patti Austin
- Take This Love – Sergio Mendes
- Amazing Grace – Judy Collins
- Smooth Love – Metropolis

=== Michael and Julia ===
- Two Worlds Apart – Billie Hughes
- Turn It All Around
- Nothing In Common

=== Mason and Julia ===
- Never Thought That I Could Love – Dan Hill

=== 1990–1991 Robert Barr and Kelly Capwell and Craig Hunt ===
- Welcome to the Edge – Billie Hughes

== See also ==
- Supercouple
