= Chandler family =

Family on "All My Children" TV series

Chandler Family
- All My Children family
- First appearance: 1983
- Last appearance: September 2, 2013
- Created by: Wisner Washam
- Introduced by: Jacqueline Babbin
- Duration: 1983–2011, 2013

The Chandler Family is a fictional family from the American soap opera All My Children. The Chandler family is one of the most powerful and wealthiest families in the show's history. Rising up from poverty in Pigeon Hollow, West Virginia, the Chandlers now stand as a prominent family in Pine Valley. The family runs Chandler Enterprises.

== Family members ==
=== First generation ===
- Charlotte "Lottie" Chandler
  Charlotte, affectionately referred to as "Lottie" by her brothers, was born and raised in Pigeon hollow, West Virginia. While in her late teens she became romantically involved with a young local boy named Pete Cooney. Lottie's relationship with Pete Cooney ended when Cooney was drafted into the military and shipped off to Europe. Soon after Cooney's departure, Lottie found that she was pregnant with his child. When the baby was born, she named him Ross. As Lottie's letters to Pete Cooney never reached him and as he did not return to Pigeon Hollow after the war, it was many years until Cooney, now known as Palmer Cortlandt, learned of Charlotte's pregnancy and the birth of his son. Charlotte, weighed down by feelings of rejection and shame, committed suicide a few years after Ross' birth.
- Stuart Chandler (David Canary)
  Stuart is the identical twin brother to wealthy businessman, Adam Chandler. However, Stuart is deliberately played to be Adam's exact opposite in personality: while Adam is ruthless, unethical, and domineering, Stuart is kind, generous, and honest. This is also reflected in their physical appearances: Adam always wears a business suit and keeps his hair slick and neat, while Stuart wore colorful cardigans with slacks and had rumpled hair. Stuart often serves as his brother's conscience, attempting to sway Adam from some of his more heartless schemes. He has married three times to Joanna Yaegar, Cindy Parker and Marian Colby.
- Adam Chandler Sr. (David Canary)
  Introduced in 1983, Adam comes from humble beginnings in Pigeon Hollow, West Virginia to become the wealthiest man in Pine Valley, Pennsylvania. Adam is the youngest of the Chandler siblings, several minutes younger than his twin brother, Stuart. The series details other characters considering him to be one of the most devious individuals within town. His business dealings have been witnessed to get him in severe trouble. He was given a close relationship with his family and especially to his identical twin brother Stuart by the series. Adam has fathered five children and been married several times including to Erica Kane, Brooke English, and Liza Colby.

=== Second generation ===
- Ross Chandler (Robert Gentry)
  Ross is Lottie's son with Palmer Cortlandt aka Pete Cooney. Ross is a significant character from the canvas of All My Children, for it is his birth that led the feud between two of Pine Valley's wealthiest men, Palmer Cortlandt and Adam Chandler. The Cooneys and Chandlers were two working-class families in Pigeon Hollow, West Virginia. Ross was then raised by his uncle Adam. Extremely bitter after Lottie's death, Adam raised Ross to hate Pete Cooney, who eventually changed his name to Palmer Cortlandt. Ross married Ellen Sheppard, while Ross and Ellen were married they adopted a teenage Julie Rand. Ellen eventually learned of Ross's infidelity and divorced him and moved out. In the meantime Natalie rejected Ross, and accepted Palmers's marriage proposal. Angry that he was spurned by Natalie, he barged into her room and raped her, his daughter Julie heard Natalie's screams and thus Ross was convicted. Ross was sent to prison, but there he realized what he had done and repented and mended fences with his loved ones, when he was let out of jail he left Pine Valley and hasn't returned since.
- Skye Chandler (Robin Christopher)
  Adam's daughter Skye arrived in Pine Valley as a singer and it was discovered that she was Adam Chandler's daughter by his first wife, Althea Patterson. Adam abandoned Skye and her mother when she was five. Skye's mother, Althea, was mentally ill and gave her little attention. She returned to Pine Valley as a troubled woman who desperately wanted her father Adam's love and attention. Skye showed up in Llanview in July 1999 at the request of Asa Buchanan. Skye got some unexpected support from police detective John Sykes, who was dating Rae Cummings (Linda Dano) and had learned that Skye was Rae's daughter. Skye, who realized Adam Chandler wasn't her father after all, asked Rae who her father was, but Rae refused to tell her until she talked to him first. So when Skye overheard that Rae was going to Port Charles to tell her father about her, she jumped on a plane and got there first. It was later discovered that Alan Quartermaine was not her biological father after all, but nevertheless he adopts Skye and welcomes her to the Quartermaine family. In 2008, she and Lila Rae left Port Charles to live somewhere where no one knows of her or her past, but they return in 2010, 2011 and 2012 for family events.
- Hayley Vaughan Santos (Kelly Ripa)
  Adam's daughter with Arlene Vaughan, born in 1973 and raised as the daughter of Harry Vaughan. Hayley arrives in Pine Valley on Thanksgiving Day 1990. She appears in punk style, with her hair dyed jet black in a Cassandra Peterson/Elvira hairdo and matching makeup. She crashes her uncle Trevor Dillon and Natalie Dillon's party and announces that she is staying with them. Her mother, Arlene Vaughan, soon follows and it is revealed that Hayley had spent a miserable childhood playing caretaker to her alcoholic mother. Hayley changes her career, becoming the host of a television style show called "Wave." Life takes an unexpected turn in late 2002 when Hayley is told that there is an interest in syndicating her Wave talk show. Hayley does not want to take the job offer because it will mean relocating to California. She and Mateo bicker back and forth for a bit before eventually agreeing to leave Pine Valley.
- Scott Chandler (Daniel Cosgrove)
  Scott is the son of Fred Parker and his wife Cindy (Ellen Wheeler). Fred was an intravenous drug user; and, through the sharing of needles, he contracted the HIV virus, which resulted in his death from AIDS. In 1988, Cindy is befriended by Jesse and Angie Hubbard, who take her and Scott into their home. Scott becomes best friends with Jesse and Angie's son Frankie, and the Hubbards are Cindy's closest supporters when she develops AIDS herself. Cindy is ostracized by many Pine Valley residents, including Skye Chandler (Robin Christopher), Enid Nelson (Natalie Ross), and a hate group that sets fire to the Hubbard home. Cindy later died, but not before falling in love with and marrying Skye's uncle Stuart Chandler (David Canary), who adopts Scott. Scott briefly marries Annie Lavery in 2010.
- Adam "JR" Chandler Jr. (Jacob Young)
  Born (on-screen) in 1989 revised to 1983, JR is Adam's son with Dixie Cooney. As the son of Adam and the great nephew of Palmer Cortlandt, JR binds the two longtime enemies to each other for life (as does his rarely seen older cousin, Ross Chandler). A top television anti-hero as well as one of its prominent bad boys, JR is a varying combination of angst. The character has battled a drug problem during his teenage years, and has since strived to overcome his alcohol addiction. His romantic life has been tumultuous as well, as his true love and ex-wife Babe Carey has been both his lover and enemy and was killed due to injuries caused by a tornado. He is the father of Adam Chandler III, latest heir to the Chandler fortune, the writers scripted JR as consistently being someone his child can rely on. With loyalty important to him, he can be deadly if betrayed. His ruthlessness is characterized as a result of his difficult childhood. The writers incorporated a caring side to JR to gauge his resistance to the dark nature of his inner turmoil. The complexity of the character has contributed to JR being described as one of the most intriguing and tortured characters in daytime television.
- Colby Chandler (Brooke Newton)
  Colby was born in 1999 to Liza Colby, who had decided to have a child via artificial insemination. Liza chose Dr. Jake Martin to be the sperm donor/father of her child; however, Liza's ex-husband, Adam Chandler, was jealous of this arrangement and secretly purchased the sperm bank and substituted his own sperm donation for Jake's, thus making him Colby's biological father. At the time of Colby's birth, both Liza and Jake believed that Jake was her father and, thus, the child was originally named "Colby Marian Martin". In 2000, it was revealed that Adam was actually Colby's biological father when Jake sued for custody of the child. In 2006 a rebellious Colby Chandler, then incognito, shows up in Pine Valley. She steals a car and gets arrested, refusing to give the authorities her name. She makes a phone call and is revealed to be Adam Chandler's long lost daughter (aged by several years). She ran away from her mother, Liza Colby after years in hiding.
- Miguel Reyes
  Miguel Adam's illegitimate son conceived during a one-night stand with Sonia Reyes. Adam doesn't learn of him until he is older and by then Sonia wants him to have nothing to do with Miguel. In 2010, when JR Chandler is diagnosed with Leukemia, Adam has Tad Martin (Michael E. Knight) track Miguel down to give bone marrow. Miguel agrees but then he never shows leaving JR to die.

=== Third generation ===
- Julie Rand Chandler
  In January 1986, shy teen Julie Rand is adopted by Ross Chandler and his wife Ellen. Julie began dating Martin grandson, Charlie Brent. Julie discovered that her birth parents were Elizabeth Carlyle and Mark Dalton, Ellen's ex-husband. The devastating truth was that Elizabeth gave her up because she was a hooker. While in New York she befriended Creed Kelly, who seemed genuine but was only using Julie to get back at Elizabeth, an old enemy of his. Julie also got close to Nico, Creed's nephew. Nico knew his uncle planned to rape Julie in front of her mother, Elizabeth and stepped in to save Julie. Grateful that Nico saved her from Creed's vengeful plans, the two fell in love. Julie eventually came back to Pine Valley to confront Ross about Natalie's rape. Julie then officially ended things Charlie. Soon Nico was released from jail and the couple were wed. Unfortunately, the mayor who performed the ceremony was not licensed to officiate weddings so it was not legal.
- Lorenzo Hector "Enzo" Santos
  Enzo is Hayley's son with Mateo Santos. On February 21, 2001, Hayley learns from a psychic visiting Wave that she is pregnant. On August 29, 2001, Hayley delivers a healthy baby boy, after some brief complications. Enzo has a paternal half-brother, Max Santos.
- Adam "AJ" Chandler III
  Adam "AJ" Chandler III is the son of JR Chandler and Babe Carey Chandler. The character appeared on ABC's One Life to Live from 2004 to 2005 during a "baby switch" storyline involving both series. Babe and JR wage their own custody battle over their son, now named Adam Chandler III. At one point Babe goes on the run with JR's stepbrother Jamie Martin, giving her son the alias James Carey. In 2010, AJ is adopted by his stepmother/maternal aunt Marissa. In 2011, Marissa is awarded sole custody of AJ since JR refuses to seek treatment for his alcoholism.
- Lila Rae Alcazar
  Born in 2006, Lila Rae is the daughter of Skye Chandler Quartermaine and Lorenzo Alcazar (Ted King). During her pregnancy, Skye fears having a gangster's child and flees town with the help of Robert Scorpio. Close to her due date, Skye calls her adoptive grandfather, Edward Quartermaine; and the call is traced by Alcazar. He finds his way to Skye but is tied to a chair by Robert and Luke Spencer. Skye goes into labor, and Luke unties Alcazar. Skye returns to Port Charles, and she and Alcazar soon reconcile. Lila's last name is changed to Alcazar, but months later Alcazar is murdered. Following Alcazar's death, Skye leaves Port Charles with Lila Rae. In November 2012, Lila Rae returns to Port Charles with Skye for Thanksgiving and Edward's funeral.

== Family tree ==
Lottie Chandler	Palmer Cortlandt
Ross Chandler	Ellen Shepard
Julie Rand Chandler (adopted)

Stuart Chandler
Scott Chandler (adopted)

Cindy Parker	Sonia Reyes	Althea Patterson	Adam Chandler	Dixie Cooney	Liza Colby
Miguel Reyes	Lorenzo Alcazar	Skye Chandler (adopted)	JR Chandler	Babe Carey	Colby Chandler
Lila Rae Alcazar	AJ Chandler

Arlene Vaughan
Hayley Vaughan	Mateo Santos
Lorenzo Santos

== Descendants ==
- Adam Chandler (born 1945)
  - m. Althea Patterson (div. off-screen)
    - c. Skye Chandler Quartermaine (born offscreen 1965 revised to 1967, adopted)
      - m. Tom Cudahy (m. 1988, div. 1988)
      - m. Jonathan Kinder (div. 1996)
      - m. Ben Davidson (born 1961, div. off-screen)
      - m. Jasper Jacks (m. 2002, div. 2003)
      - a. Lorenzo Alcazar
        - c. Lila Rae Alcazar (born 2006)
  - m. Erica Kane (born 1962, m. 1984, div. 1984)
  - m. Brooke English (m. 1988, div. 1989)
  - m. Dixie Cooney (born 1963, m. 1989, div. 1989)
    - c. Adam "JR" Chandler Jr. (born 1989 revised 1983)
      - m. Arabella "Babe" Carey (born 1983, m. 2004, div. 2005)
      - m. Arabella "Babe" Carey (m. 2006, div. 2007)
      - m. Arabella "Babe" Carey (m. 2008, deceased)
        - c. AJ Chandler (born 2004 revised 1997)
      - m. Marissa Tasker (born 1983, m. 2010, divorcing Marissa)
      - a. Annie Lavery (born 1978, 2010–present)
  - m. Natalie Marlowe (m. 1990, div. 1991)
  - m. Gloria Marsh (m. 1993, div. 1995)
    - c. Anna Claire Chandler (b. 1995, deceased 1995)
  - m. Liza Colby (born 1964, m. 1996, div. 1997)
  - m. Liza Colby (m. 1999, div. 2000)
  - m. Liza Colby (m. 2001, div. 2003)
    - c. Colby Chandler (born 1999 revised to 1990)
  - m. Arlene Vaughan (m. 2000, div. 2000)
    - c. Hayley Vaughan Santos
      - m. Will Cortlandt (m. 1992, div. 1992)
      - m. Alec McIntyre (m. 1996, div. 1996)
      - m. Mateo Santos (m. 1997, invalid 1998)
      - m. Mateo Santos (m. 2000)
        - c. Lorenzo Hector Santos (born 2001 revised 1991)
  - m. Krystal Carey (m. 2005, div. 2007)
  - m. Annie Lavery (m. 2010, div. 2010)
- Stuart Chandler
  - m. Joanna Yaeger (div. 1984)
  - m. Cindy Parker (m. 1988, dis. 1989)
    - c. Scott Parker (adopted by Stuart)
      - m. Annie Lavery (m. 2010, divorcing Annie)
  - m. Marian Chandler (m. 1999, div. 2009)
- Charlotte "Lottie" Chandler (deceased)
  - a. Palmer Cortlandt
    - c. Ross Chandler
      - m. Cynthia Preston (div. off-screen)
      - m. Ellen Shepherd (m. 1984, div. 1987)
        - c. Julie Rand Chandler (ad. 1987)
          - m. Nico Kelly (m. 1988, invalid. 1989)

== Chandler Enterprises ==
Chandler Enterprises
- Type: (private)
- Industry: Conglomerate
- Founded: Pigeon Hollow, West Virginia
- Founder: Adam Chandler
- Headquarters: Pine Valley, U.S.
- Key people: Adam Chandler brooke english
- Owner: Adam Chandler (sole owner)
- Divisions: Chandler Media
- Subsidiaries: Tempo magazine IncredibleDreams.com; Enchantment Cosmetics

Chandler Enterprises is a fictional company featured on the popular ABC daytime soap opera, All My Children.

Personnel:

- Adam Chandler (chairman of the board, majority owner)
- Brooke English (chief executive officer)
- Dimitri Marick (executive of chandler media)
- Colby Chandler (executive of chandler media)
