= List of Soap Opera Digest Awards =

The first annual Soap Opera Digest Awards were held in 1984, with the second being screened on NBC and Days of Our Lives winning every award in the daytime categories. For the subsequent six years votes were for awards in either daytime soaps, or primetime (with editor awards being for either). From the 9th event onwards votes were across both types of shows.

== Key ==
Indicates award for daytime soap opera	Indicates award available to either daytime or primetime	Hosts
Indicates award for a primetime soap	Indicates award not awarded that year	Unknown

== Awards dedicated to daytime ==
Award (year and where aired) Hosts	1st	2nd	3rd	4th	5th	6th	7th	8th
Award (year and where aired) Hosts	1984	1985	1986	1988	1989	1990	1991	1992
Award (year and where aired) Hosts		NBC						
Award (year and where aired) Hosts	Catherine Hickland and David Hasselhoff		Susan Lucci and Kevin Dobson	A Martinez and Marcy Walker; David Canary and Susan Lucci; Drake Hogestyn and Genie Francis; Leann Hunley and Gordon Thomson	John Loprieno and Andrea Evans	Dixie Carter and Terry Lester	Robin Mattson and Kevin Dobson	Deidre Hall, Emma Samms and George Hamilton
Outstanding actor	Peter Reckell (Days of Our Lives)		John Aniston (Days of Our Lives)	Stephen Nichols (Days of Our Lives)	Eric Braeden (The Young and the Restless)	A Martinez (Santa Barbara)		David Canary (Adam Chandler / Stuart Chandler, All My Children)
Outstanding actress	Deidre Hall (Days of Our Lives)		Patsy Pease (Days of Our Lives)	Kim Zimmer (Guiding Light)	Jeanne Cooper (The Young and the Restless)	Marcy Walker (Santa Barbara)	Finola Hughes (General Hospital)	Anne Heche (Vicky Hudson / Marley Hudson, Another World)
Outstanding Actor in a Supporting Role	John de Lancie (Days of Our Lives)		Stephen Nichols (Days of Our Lives)	Nicolas Coster (Santa Barbara)	Quinn K. Redeker (The Young and the Restless)	Robert Gentry (All My Children)	Jordan Clarke (Guiding Light)	Doug Davidson (Paul Williams, The Young and the Restless)
Outstanding Actress in a Supporting Role	Lisa Trusel (Days of Our Lives)	Arleen Sorkin (Days of Our Lives)	Harley Jane Kozak (Santa Barbara)	Anna Lee (General Hospital)	Joy Garrett (Days of Our Lives)	Jane A. Rogers (Santa Barbara)	Julia Barr (All My Children)	Jane Elliot (Tracy Quartermaine, General Hospital)
Exciting/Outstanding New Actor	Michael Leon (Days of Our Lives)	Charles Shaughnessy (Days of Our Lives)		Ian Buchanan (General Hospital) (Note: For the 1984 ceremony, the award was given as "Exciting/Outstanding Newcomer")	Scott Thompson Baker (General Hospital)	Kurt McKinney (General Hospital)	Michael Watson (General Hospital)	Paul Michael Valley (Ryan Harrison, Another World)
Exciting/Outstanding New Actress	Kristian Alfonso (Days of Our Lives)	Arleen Sorkin (Days of Our Lives)			Anne Heche (Another World)	Jean Carol (Guiding Light)	Kimberley Simms (Guiding Light)	Alla Korot (Jenna Norris, Another World)
Outstanding actor in a mature role	Macdonald Carey (Days of Our Lives)							
Outstanding actress in a mature role	Frances Reid (Days of Our Lives)							
Outstanding youth/younger actor	David Mendenhall (General Hospital)	Brian Autenrieth (Days of Our Lives)	Peter Reckell (Days of Our Lives)					Ricky Paull Goldin (Dean Frame, Another World)
Outstanding youth/younger actress	Andrea Barber (Days of Our Lives)		Ellen Wheeler (Marley/Victoria, Another World)					Tricia Cast (Nina Webster, The Young and the Restless)
Outstanding Villain	Joseph Mascolo (Days of Our Lives)		John Aniston (Days of Our Lives)	Justin Deas (Santa Barbara)	Matthew Ashford (Days of Our Lives)	David Canary (All My Children)	Kin Shriner (General Hospital)	Michael Zaslow (Roger Thorpe, Guiding Light)
Outstanding Villainess	Nancy Frangione (Another World)	Cheryl-Ann Wilson (Days of Our Lives)	Linda Gibboney (Santa Barbara)	Brenda Dickson (The Young and the Restless)	Lynn Herring (General Hospital)	Jane Elliot (Tracy Quartermaine, General Hospital)	Lynn Herring (Lucy Coe, General Hospital)	
Outstanding juvenile actor/actress			Kimberly McCullough (Robin Scorpio, General Hospital)					
Outstanding Contribution			Deidre Hall (Days of Our Lives)					
Outstanding Comic Relief Role			Arleen Sorkin (Days of Our Lives)					Robert Mailhouse (Brian Scofield, Days of our Lives)
Favorite Daytime Super Couple			Charles Shaughnessy and Patsy Pease (Days of Our Lives)		Stephen Nichols and Mary Beth Evans (Days of Our Lives)	Marcy Walker and A Martinez (Santa Barbara)	Matthew Ashford and Melissa Reeves (Days of Our Lives)	
Outstanding Comic Relief Actress				Arleen Sorkin (Days of Our Lives)	Robin Mattson (Santa Barbara)			
Outstanding Comic Relief Actor				Michael T. Weiss (Days of Our Lives)	Stephen Schnetzer (Another World)	Joe Marinelli (Santa Barbara)		
Outstanding Hero				A Martinez (Santa Barbara)	Stephen Nichols (Days of Our Lives)	Doug Davidson (The Young and the Restless)		
Outstanding Heroine				Robin Wright Penn (Santa Barbara)	Marcy Walker (Santa Barbara)	Finola Hughes (General Hospital)	Cady McClain (All My Children)	
Outstanding Storyline						Eden's Rape, Santa Barbara	Casey the Alien, General Hospital	
Outstanding Limited Run							Gerald Anthony (One Life to Live)	
Best Wedding/Love Story								Jack and Jennifer, Days of Our Lives
Best Death Scene								Marcy Walker (Eden Capwell, Santa Barbara)
Outstanding Daytime Soap Opera	Days of Our Lives					Santa Barbara	Days of Our Lives	
Outstanding actor	John Forsythe (Blake Carrington, Dynasty)	Patrick Duffy (Bobby Ewing, Dallas)	Larry Hagman (J.R. Ewing, Dallas)	Kevin Dobson (Mack MacKenzie, Knots Landing)	David Selby (Richard Channing, Falcon Crest)	William Devane (Greg Sumner, Knots Landing)		Kevin Dobson (Mack MacKenzie, Knots Landing)
Outstanding actress	Linda Evans (Krystle Carrington, Dynasty)		Joan Van Ark (Valene Ewing, Knots Landing)	Michele Lee (Karen MacKenzie, Knots Landing)	Joan Van Ark (Valene Ewing Gibson, Knots Landing)	Nicollette Sheridan (Paige Matheson, Knots Landing)	Michele Lee (Karen MacKenzie, Knots Landing)	
Outstanding Actor in a Supporting Role	Steve Kanaly (Ray Krebbs, Dallas)		Doug Sheehan (Ben Gibson, Knots Landing)	Steve Kanaly (Ray Krebbs, Dallas)	William Devane (Greg Sumner, Knots Landing)	Ken Kercheval (Cliff Barnes, Dallas)	Larry Riley (Frank Williams, Knots Landing)	
Outstanding Actress in a Supporting Role	Lisa Hartman (Ciji Dunne, Knots Landing)	Catherine Oxenberg (Amanda Carrington, Dynasty)	Susan Howard (Donna Culver Krebbs, Dallas)	Tonya Crowe (Olivia Cunningham, Knots Landing)			Lynne Moody (Patricia Williams, Knots Landing)	
Exciting New Actor	Doug Sheehan (Ben Gibson, Knots Landing)	Alec Baldwin (Joshua Rush, Knots Landing)						
Exciting New Actress	Priscilla Presley (Jenna Wade, Dallas)	Catherine Oxenberg (Amanda Carrington, Dynasty)						
Outstanding actor in a mature role	John Forsythe (Blake Carrington, Dynasty)							
Outstanding actress in a mature role	Barbara Bel Geddes (Miss Ellie Ewing, Dallas)							
Outstanding youth actor	Omri Katz (John Ross Ewing, Dallas)							
Outstanding youth actress	Shalane McCall (Charlie Wade, Dallas) (Note: For the 1985 ceremony, the award was given as "Outstanding Youth Actor/Actress")							
Outstanding Villain	Larry Hagman (J.R. Ewing, Dallas)						Sam Behrens (Danny Waleska, Knots Landing)	
Outstanding Villainess	Joan Collins (Alexis Colby, Dynasty)		Donna Mills (Abby Ewing, Knots Landing)			Teri Austin (Jill Bennett, Knots Landing) (Note: For the 1990 ceremony, the award was given as "Outstanding Villain/Villainess")	Michelle Phillips (Anne Matheson, Knots Landing)	
Outstanding Comic Relief Role			Margaret Ladd (Emma Channing, Falcon Crest)					
Favorite Supercouple			Michele Lee and Kevin Dobson (Mack and Karen MacKenzie, Knots Landing)					
Outstanding Storyline						Jill's insanity, Knots Landing	Paige and Tom's relationship, Knots Landing	
Outstanding Hero							Kevin Dobson (Mack MacKenzie, Knots Landing)	
Outstanding Heroine							Nicollette Sheridan (Paige Matheson, Knots Landing)	
Best Death Scene								Sheree J. Wilson (April Stevens Ewing, Dallas)
Outstanding Primetime Soap Opera	Dynasty		Knots Landing					
Editor's Choice Award	David Jacobs	William J. Bell	Douglas Marland	Michael Filerman and Susan Lucci	Jeanne Cooper	Frances Reid and Macdonald Carey	Eileen Fulton	William J. Bell

== United awards ==
Award (year and where aired) Hosts	9th	10th	11th	12th	13th	14th	15th	16th	17th	18th	19th
Award (year and where aired) Hosts	1993	1994	1995	1996	1997	1998	1999	2000	2001	2003	2005
Award (year and where aired) Hosts	NBC								n/a	SOAPnet	n/a
Award (year and where aired) Hosts	Deidre Hall and Paul Reiser	Kelsey Grammer and Lisa Rinna	John Larroquette, Louise Sorel, Victoria Rowell, and Kelly Ripa	Jane Leeves, Shawn Christian, Drake Hogestyn, and Keith Hamilton Cobb	Leeza Gibbons, Austin Peck, Shemar Moore, and Ingo Rademacher	Drake Hogestyn and Leeza Gibbons	Drake Hogestyn and Deidre Hall			Lisa Rinna and Ty Treadway	
Outstanding actor	Peter Bergman (Jack Abbott, The Young and the Restless)	Robert Kelker-Kelly (Bo Brady, Days of Our Lives)	Tom Eplin (Jake McKinnon, Another World)	Maurice Benard (Sonny Corinthos, General Hospital)	Eric Braeden (Victor Newman, The Young and the Restless)	John Callahan (Edmund Grey, All My Children)	Anthony Geary (Luke Spencer, General Hospital)		Eric Braeden (Victor Newman, The Young and the Restless)	Maurice Benard (General Hospital)	
Outstanding actress	Susan Lucci (Erica Kane, All My Children)	Jess Walton (Jill Abbott, The Young and the Restless)	Deidre Hall (Marlena Evans, Days of Our Lives)	Robin Strasser (Dorian Lord, One Life to Live)	Genie Francis (Laura Spencer, General Hospital)	Vanessa Marcil (Brenda Barrett, General Hospital)	Lynn Herring (Lucy Coe, Port Charles)	Kim Zimmer (Reva Shayne, Guiding Light)	Melody Thomas Scott (Nikki Newman, The Young and the Restless)	Michelle Stafford (The Young and the Restless)	Tamara Braun (Carly Corinthos, General Hospital)
Outstanding Actor in a Supporting Role	Richard Biggs (Marcus Hunter, Days of Our Lives)	Justin Deas (Buzz Cooper, Guiding Light)	Brad Maule (Tony Jones, General Hospital)	Stuart Damon (Alan Quartermaine, General Hospital)	Doug Davidson (Paul Williams, The Young and the Restless)	Michael E. Knight (Tad Martin, All My Children)	Ian Buchanan (James Warwick, B&B)	Jon Lindstrom (Kevin Collins, Port Charles)	John Aniston (Victor Kiriakis, Days of Our Lives)	Steve Burton (General Hospital)	Rick Hearst (Ric Lansing, General Hospital)
Outstanding Actress in a Supporting Role	Ellen Dolan (Margo Hughes, As the World Turns)	Deborah Adair (Kate Roberts, Days of Our Lives)	Signy Coleman (Hope Wilson, The Young and the Restless)	Louise Sorel (Vivian Alamain, Days of Our Lives)	Marcy Walker (Liza Colby, All My Children)	Judi Evans (Paulina Cory, Another World)	Lauralee Bell (Christine Blair, The Young and the Restless)	Nancy Lee Grahn (Alexis Davis, General Hospital)			Alison Sweeney (Sami Brady, Days of Our Lives)
Male Newcomer	Monti Sharp (David Grant, Guiding Light)	Patrick Muldoon (Austin Reed, Days of Our Lives)	Keith Hamilton Cobb (Noah Keefer, All My Children)	Mark Consuelos (Mateo Santos, All My Children)	Tyler Christopher (Nikolas Cassadine, General Hospital)	Jensen Ackles (Eric Brady, Days of Our Lives)	Cameron Mathison (Ryan Lavery, All My Children)	David Tom (Billy Abbott, The Young and the Restless)	Chad Brannon (Zander Smith, General Hospital)		Justin Bruening (All My Children)
Female Newcomer/ New Actress	Yvonne Perry (Rosanna Cabot, As the World Turns)	Lisa Rinna (Billie Reed, Days of Our Lives)	Brooke Alexander (Samantha Markham, As the World Turns)	Michelle Stafford (Phyllis Summers, The Young and the Restless)	T.C. Warner (Kelsey Jefferson, All My Children)	Sabryn Genet (Tricia Dennison, The Young and the Restless)	Patrika Darbo (Nancy Wesley, Days of Our Lives)	Abigail Spencer (Becca Tyree, All My Children)	Eden Riegel (Bianca Montgomery, All My Children)		Adrianne León (Brook Lynn Ashton, General Hospital)
Youth/ younger actor	Matt Borlenghi (Brian Bodine, All My Children)	Scott Reeves (Ryan McNeil, The Young and the Restless)	Roger Howarth (Todd Manning, One Life to Live)	Joshua Morrow (Nicholas Newman, The Young and the Restless)	Steve Burton (Jason Morgan, General Hospital)		Jonathan Jackson (Lucky Spencer, General Hospital)	Mark Consuelos (Mateo Santos, All My Children)	Jason Cook (Shawn-Douglas Brady, Days of Our Lives)	Kyle Lowder (Days of Our Lives)	Scott Clifton (Dillon Quartermaine, General Hospital)
Youth/ younger actress	Alicia Coppola (Lorna Devon, Another World)	Melissa Hayden (Bridget Reardon, Guiding Light)	Rena Sofer (Lois Cerullo, General Hospital)	Kelly Ripa (Hayley Vaughan, All My Children)	Heather Tom (Victoria Newman, The Young and the Restless)	Sarah Brown (Carly Benson, General Hospital)	Rebecca Herbst (Elizabeth Webber, General Hospital)	Kelly Ripa (Hayley Vaughan, All My Children)	Alison Sweeney (Sami Brady, Days of Our Lives)	Rebecca Budig (All My Children)	Eden Riegel (All My Children)
Child actor	Kimberly McCullough (Robin Scorpio, General Hospital)	Scott Groff (Shawn-Douglas Brady, Days of Our Lives)	Jonathan Jackson (Lucky Spencer, General Hospital)						Kirsten Storms (Belle Black, Days of Our Lives)		
Villain or Villainess	Kimberlin Brown (Sheila Carter, The Young and the Restless)	Louise Sorel (Vivian Alamain, Days of Our Lives)						Timothy D. Stickney (R.J. Gannon, One Life to Live)			
Outstanding Comic Performance	Matthew Ashford (Jack Deveraux, Days of Our Lives)										
Hottest Male Star/ Favorite Actor	Mark Derwin (A.C. Mallet, Guiding Light)	Drake Hogestyn (John Black, Days of Our Lives)		Peter Reckell (Bo Brady, Days of Our Lives)	Ingo Rademacher (Jasper Jacks, General Hospital)		Steve Burton (Jason Morgan, General Hospital)	Maurice Benard (Sonny Corinthos, General Hospital)			
Hottest Female Star/ Favorite Actress	Crystal Chappell (Carly Manning, Days of Our Lives)	Melissa Reeves (Jennifer Horton, Days of our Lives)	Kristina Wagner (Felicia Jones, General Hospital)	Lynn Herring (Lucy Coe, General Hospital)	Vanessa Marcil (Brenda Barrett, General Hospital)	Sharon Case (Sharon Newman, The Young and the Restless)	Kristian Alfonso (Hope Brady, Days of Our Lives)	Sarah Brown (Carly Benson, General Hospital)			
Favorite Song/ Musical Achievement	"One Dream" (Days of Our Lives)	Days of Our Lives									
Social Storyline	Margo's Rape; As the World Turns										
Favorite Storyline		"Who fathered Marlena's baby?" (Days of Our Lives)							The Baby Switch, Days of Our Lives		
Scene Stealer		Victoria Rowell (Drucilla Winters, The Young and the Restless)						Josh Ryan Evans (Timmy Lenox, Passions			
Villain			Jason Brooks (Peter Blake, Days of Our Lives)	Mark Pinter (Grant Harrison, Another World)	Joseph Mascolo (Stefano DiMera, Days of Our Lives)	Roger Howarth (Todd Manning, One Life to Live)	Vincent Irizarry (David Hayward, All My Children)		Rick Hearst (Matt Clark, The Young and the Restless)		Ted King (Lorenzo Alcazar, General Hospital)
Villainess			Kimberlin Brown (Sheila Carter, The Bold and the Beautiful)	Alison Sweeney (Sami Brady, Days of Our Lives)	Michelle Stafford (Phyllis Summers, The Young and the Restless)	Alison Sweeney (Sami Brady, Days of Our Lives)			Arianne Zuker (Nicole Walker, Days of Our Lives)		Jane Elliot (Tracy Quartermaine, General Hospital)
Hottest Couple / Romance			Robert Kelker-Kelly and Lisa Rinna (Bo Brady and Billie Reed, Days of Our Lives)	Keith Hamilton Cobb and Sydney Penny (Noah Keefer and Julia Santos, All My Children))	Austin Peck and Christie Clark (Austin Reed and Carrie Brady, Days of Our Lives)	Mark Consuelos and Kelly Ripa (Mateo Santos and Hayley Vaughan, All My Children)					
Male Scene Stealer/ Show Stopper			Michael E. Knight (Tad Martin, All My Children)	Tuc Watkins (David Vickers, One Life to Live)	Tom Eplin (Jake McKinnon, Another World)	John Ingle (Edward Quartermaine, General Hospital)	Kin Shriner (Scott Baldwin, Port Charles)		Josh Ryan Evans (Timmy Lenox, Passions)		
Female Scene Stealer/ Show Stopper			Louise Sorel (Vivian Alamain, Days of our Lives)	Robin Mattson (Janet Green, All My Children)	Louise Sorel (Vivian Alamain, Days of Our Lives)	Jennifer Bassey (Marian Colby, All My Children)	Louise Sorel (Vivian Alamain, Days of Our Lives)		Robin Strasser (Hecuba, Passions)		
New Character						Laura Wright (Cassie Layne, Guiding Light)					
Teen Performer						Erin Torpey (Jessica Buchanan, One Life to Live)		Erin Torpey (Jessica Buchanan, One Life to Live)			Kristen Alderson (One Life to Live)
New Couple						Grant Aleksander and Beth Ehlers (Phillip Spaulding and Harley Cooper, Guiding Light)					Alison Sweeney and Bryan R. Dattilo (Sami and Lucas, Days of Our Lives)
Veteran							Stuart Damon (Alan Quartermaine, General Hospital)				
Favorite Couple							David Canary and Jennifer Bassey (Stuart Chandler and Marian Colby, All My Children)	Erika Slezak and Mark Derwin (Victoria Lord and Ben Davidson, One Life to Live)	Peter Reckell and Kristian Alfonso (Bo Brady and Hope Williams, Days of Our Lives)		Drake Hogestyn and Deidre Hall (John and Marlena, Days of our Lives)
Favorite Return							Cady McClain (Dixie Cooney, All My Children)	Finola Hughes (Alexandra Devane, All My Children)		Vanessa Marcil (General Hospital)	Judi Evans (Days of Our Lives)
Favorite Hero									Joshua Morrow (Nicholas Newman, The Young and the Restless)		
Favorite Heroine									McKenzie Westmore (Sheridan Crane, Passions)		
Plot twist										Sonny and Alexis, General Hospital	
Outstanding Newcomer										Melissa Archer (One Life to Live)	
Favorite Triangle											Melissa Archer, Michael Easton and Renée Elise Goldsberry; Natalie, John, Evangeline, One Life to Live)
Outstanding Soap Opera	Days of Our Lives				General Hospital				Days of Our Lives	General Hospital	
Editor's Choice	Douglas Marland and Laurence Caso	Betty Rea	Claire Labine	Agnes Nixon	Aaron Spelling	Don Hastings and Kathryn Hays	Michael Zaslow				
Diamond Award										Susan Lucci	
