= Scott Chandler (All My Children) =

Fiction character from ABC daytime drama, All My Children

- All My Children character
- Daniel Cosgrove as Scott Chandler.
- Portrayed by: Philip Amelio (1987–91); Shane McDermott (1995–96); Daniel Cosgrove (1996–98, 2010–11); Forbes March (1999–2000); Adam Mayfield (2009–10)
- Duration: 1987–1991; 1995–2000; 2009–2011
- First appearance: September 24, 1987
- Last appearance: September 23, 2011
- Created by: Lorraine Broderick
- Introduced by: Stephen Schenkel
- Adam Mayfield as Scott Chandler
In-universe information
- Other names: Scott Parker
- Occupation: C.E.O of Chandler Enterprises and 51% stockholder Data Entry Clerk at Pine Valley Hospital
- Family: Chandler (adoptive)
- Parents: Fred Parker; Cindy Parker Chandler
- Adoptive father: Stuart Chandler
- Stepmother: Marian Colby Chandler (adoptive)
- Spouse: Annie Novak (2010)
- Aunts and uncles: Karen Parker; Lottie Chandler (adoptive); Adam Chandler (adoptive)
- First cousins: Ross Chandler (adoptive); Skye Chandler (legal); Hayley Vaughan (adoptive); JR Chandler (adoptive); Anna Chandler (adoptive); Miguel Reyes (adoptive); Colby Chandler (adoptive); Julie Rand Chandler (once removed; adoptive); Lila Rae Alcazar (once removed; legal); Lorenzo Santos (once removed; adoptive); AJ Chandler (once removed; adoptive)

Scott Chandler is a fictional character from ABC daytime drama, All My Children. He was most recently portrayed by Adam Mayfield from April 9, 2009 to October 13, 2010. Previously, Scott was portrayed, most notably by Daniel Cosgrove from November 27, 1996 to July 28, 1998, and Forbes March from April 19, 1999 to September 14, 2000. He is a member of the powerful and wealthy Chandler family. On September 16, 2010, Mayfield, alongside Brittany Allen, were let go as Scott and Marissa Tasker in order for the writers to take the characters in a new direction, and on September 23, 2010, it was revealed that Cosgrove will be returning as Scott on December 27, 2010.

== Storylines ==
Scott is the son of Fred Parker and his wife, Cindy (Ellen Wheeler). Fred was an intravenous drug user, and through the sharing of needles he contracted HIV, which resulted in his death from AIDS. In 1988, Cindy is befriended by Jesse and Angie Hubbard, who take her and Scott into their home. Scott becomes best friends with Jesse and Angie's son Frankie, and the Hubbards are Cindy's closest supporters when she develops AIDS herself. Cindy was ostracized by many Pine Valley residents, including Skye Chandler (Robin Christopher), Enid Nelson (Natalie Ross), and a hate group that sets fire to the Hubbard home. Cindy later died, but not before falling in love with and marrying Skye's uncle Stuart Chandler (David Canary), who adopts Scott.

Scott enrolled in Pine Valley High School in 1995 and developed a crush on his best friend Anita Santos, but she was madly in love with Bobby Warner. Scott then turned to Laura Kirk, a girl he was tutoring. Scott's smarts helped him to skip his senior year of high school and go straight to college. Laura and Scott's relationship never actually went anywhere because Laura had a dark past and felt it better that they go separate ways. Next, he began a romance with Hungarian princess, Gillian Andrassy. Kelsey Jefferson, who liked Scott, teamed up with Ryan Lavery to break them up. After the original plan went bad, Kelsey called immigration to have Gillian deported. Scott told Gillian he would marry her so she wouldn't have to leave, but before they could say, "I do," the wedding was interrupted by Ryan, who was pretending to be rich to get Gillian's attention. Gillian fell for it and married Ryan. That same year the Chandler family was being attacked by Lee Hawkins, who blamed Adam, Scott's uncle, for the death of his wife, Joy. The real story was that Adam and Stuart had sent Joy into hiding to escape her abusive husband. Scott was electrocuted at the Chandler cabin and fell into a coma. After his recovery, Stuart sent him to college in California to escape Lee.

Scott returned to Pine Valley in 1999 to do a documentary about the town. While in Pigeon Hollow, West Virginia, he met an assistant: Becca Tyree. They grew very close and Scott wanted to be intimate. Becca turned him down, telling him she was a virgin and was waiting for marriage. Scott told her he would wait for her, but that all went up in smoke when Greenlee Smythe came to Pine Valley. The two had dated back in California, and she was still very much attracted to Scott. Greenlee set it up for Becca to find a sex tape she'd made with him. When Scott found out, he went to confront her but ended up sleeping with her. Becca found the tape and ended their relationship, even though Scott still wanted to be with her. Greenlee made a bet with Leo du Pres to see if he could get Becca to give up her virginity to him. Scott created a website where men placed bets on when the two would sleep together and put it in Leo's name. His plan was abandoned when he found his stepmother Marian Chandler in bed with another man. Before Scott could tell his father, Stuart was thought to have died in a cabin fire. After trying to stay with his family without his father, Scott decided to make a fresh start. He told Becca the website was his idea, and she couldn't forgive him. Scott enrolled into film school at NYU.

In the wake of JR Chandler's intention to make cuts within Chandler Enterprises, Scott returned on April 9, 2009 and greeted his cousin with a punch in the face. Adam had refused earlier to finance Scott's film production company as he had promised Stuart he would. On May 19, Scott learned that his father was killed by a bullet meant for his uncle Adam. His cousin JR and he fought for the attention of Marissa Tasker, the daughter of JR's sworn enemy and ex-father-in-law David Hayward.

Scott had an affair with his uncle's wife Annie Lavery. He and Annie discovered that Adam killed his twin brother Stuart and kept it a secret to protect Adam.

On July 9, 2010, Scott's cousin JR found out that Scott had stolen the Nanotech project from his great-uncle Palmer Cortlandt. Scott became engaged to Annie Lavery in July, but they divorce later that year. On October 13, 2010, Scott went to prison.

On December 27, Marissa visited Scott in prison to wish him a Merry Christmas and to help him get an early parole. Greenlee Smythe visited Scott in prison on January 10, 2011, letting him know she had an offer for him; she would get him a job as co-owner of Pine Valley Hospital if he befriended Madison North, whom he had met earlier while Greenlee was there to see her father. Scott told Greenlee he was going to do this "his way." Greenlee spoke on Scott's behalf at his parole hearing, and he was released from prison.

Greenlee got Scott a job as a data entry clerk at Pine Valley Hospital (as part of their agreement). He began dating Madison (as part of his side in the agreement).
