= Arlene Vaughan =

- All My Children character
- Olivia Birkelund as Arlene Vaughan
- Portrayed by: Phyllis Lyons (1990–93); Olivia Birkelund (1995, 2000–02)
- Duration: 1990–93; 1995; 2000–02
- First appearance: 1990
- Last appearance: June 11, 2002
- Created by: Agnes Nixon
- Introduced by: Felicia Minei Behr (1990, 1995); Jean Dadario Burke (2000)
In-universe information
- Occupation: Bartender at Adam's Place; Bookkeeper for a Dalton, Georgia-based carpet manufacturer
- Brothers: Trevor Dillon
- Spouse: Harry Vaughan (1969–89); Adam Chandler (2000)
- Daughters: Hayley Vaughan
- Grandsons: Enzo Santos
- Nephews: Tim Dillon (adoptive)
- Nieces: Amanda Dillon
- Other relatives: Trevor Martin

Arlene Vaughan is a fictional character from the ABC soap opera All My Children. The character was originated by actress Phyllis Lyons. She portrayed the role from 1990 to 1993. Olivia Birkelund, most identified in the role, took over the role in 1995 and portrayed it from April 1995 to September 1995. She then returned to the role again in 2000, 2001, and finally 2002.

== Storylines ==
Arlene Vaughan comes to Pine Valley hot on the heels of her runaway daughter, Hayley. In Pine Valley, Hayley discovers that her biological father is Adam Chandler, though she was raised to believe different. Arlene is an alcoholic, and one night after she drinks and drives, she crashes into a car being driven by Jackson Montgomery, with a pregnant Brooke English inside.

Arlene's other habit is being attracted to her daughter's boyfriends and husbands. She and Alec McIntyre, Hayley's then-husband, have a one-night stand, or so Alec thinks. Arlene blackmails him into more sex. She decides to tell Hayley the truth about her and Alec, but Alec insists on one more night. That night, instead of sex, Alec pours alcohol down Arlene's throat, saying to her that every time he had sex with her, it disgusted him. Hayley witnesses this and Alec is eventually sent to jail for trying to kill Arlene through alcohol poisoning. Arlene soon leaves town afterward.

She makes several more trips back to Pine Valley, however, much to the dismay of her daughter. In 2000, she begins drinking again and gets behind the wheel of a car, crashing into Stuart Chandler. Arlene marries Stuart's twin brother, Adam, and ends up pregnant by him, but miscarries the baby, and Adam soon divorces her.

Hayley and Mateo Santos have a child in 2001. Determined to see her new grandson, little Enzo, Arlene steals a lock of his hair. Hayley wants nothing to do with her, however, so she quickly leaves town, abandoning her plan to kidnap Enzo.

In 2002, after Enzo becomes ill and needs a donor, Arlene returns to Pine Valley one final time. Virtually no one is glad to see her, but it's revealed that Hayley is the one who called Arlene and asked her to test to be a possible donor for Enzo. But this time, Arlene truly does want to help and to mend fences with her daughter. Even though Hayley's judgment is somewhat skewed by post-pardom depression, she and Arlene actually get along very well for the first time in years. Sadly, however, Arlene proves to be incompatible, which devastates her and Hayley. Later, Arlene retreats to a nearby bar to drown her sorrows, where she is found by Mateo, who was the most suspicious of her motives. He apologizes to her for being wrong and gives her a pep talk, encouraging her not to fall back on alcohol like she had done in the past. Bolstered by Mateo's words, Arlene departs from Pine Valley, leaving the bar—and her drink—behind, indicating that there is finally hope for her and her future sobriety.
