= Olivia Birkelund =

American actress (born 1963)

- Born: April 26, 1963 (age 63); New York City, U.S.
- Education: Brown University
- Known for: All My Children; Star Trek: Voyager; Guiding Light

Olivia Birkelund (born April 26, 1963) is an American actress, best known for her role as Arlene Vaughan in the ABC daytime soap opera All My Children.

== Early life and education ==
Birkelund was born in New York City. She attended Brown University and studied acting at the Circle in the Square Theatre School.

== Career ==
In 1991 she made her television debut as Sondra Hill in the ABC daytime soap opera, One Life to Live. In 1995, Birkelund began starring as Arlene Dillon Vaughan Chandler, Hayley's alcoholic mother, in the ABC soap opera All My Children. She appeared in show to 2002 on recurring basis. In 2008 she had another soap role, on CBS's Guiding Light.

Birkelund appeared in films Letters from a Killer (1998), The Bone Collector (1999), Uninvited (1999), Far from Heaven (2002), and on made for television movies Night Sins and On the Edge of Innocence (1997). She guest-starred on Law & Order, Homicide: Life on the Street, Star Trek: Voyager, Law & Order: Special Victims Unit, Third Watch, Law & Order: Criminal Intent, and The Good Wife. In 2014, Birkelund had a recurring role in the ABC drama Black Box.

== Filmography ==
=== Film ===
Year	Title	Role	Notes
1998	Letters from a Killer	Stephanie	
1999	The Bone Collector	Lindsay Rubin	
1999	Uninvited	Patricia Carver	
2002	Far from Heaven	Nancy	
2017	Coin Heist	Mrs. Hodges	

=== Television ===
Year	Title	Role	Notes
1995–2002	All My Children	Arlene Vaughan	17 episodes
1995–2009	Law & Order	Various roles	3 episodes
1996	Aliens in the Family	Michelle Bellamy	Episode: "Meet the Brodys"
1997	Night Sins	Karen Wright	Television film
1997	On the Edge of Innocence	Dr. Sharon	Television film
1998	Soul Man	Karen	Episode: "A Kiss Is Just a Kiss"
1998	Homicide: Life on the Street	Myra Seeling	Episode: "Red, Red Wine"
1999	Star Trek: Voyager	Ensign Marla Gilmore	2 episodes
2000, 2016	Law & Order: Special Victims Unit	Ellen Roberts / Jane Tyler	2 episodes
2002	Ed	Kathleen Tarler	Episode: "Neighbors"
2003	Third Watch	Claire Henley	Episode: "Castles of Sand"
2003	Biography	Arlene Vaughn Chandler	Episode: "All My Children"
2008	Guiding Light	Phoebe	2 episodes
2008	Law & Order: Criminal Intent	Blair Khan	Episode: "Assassin"
2009	The Good Wife	Partygoer	Episode: "Home"
2013	Unforgettable	Gisele Emminger	Episode: "Line Up or Shut Up"
2014	Believe	Dr. Boyle	Episode: "Beginner's Luck"
2014	Black Box	Karina Black	3 episodes
2016	BrainDead	Norah Moody	2 episodes
