= Scott Chandler =

Scott Chandler may refer to:

- Scott Chandler (American football) (born 1985), American football tight end
- Scott Chandler (All My Children), a fictional character in the U.S. TV soap opera All My Children
