= Skye Chandler =

Fictional character from All My Children

- All My Children character
- Robin Christopher as Skye Chandler
- Portrayed by: Antoinette Byron (1986–1987); Robin Christopher (1987–1991, 1999–2012); Carrie Genzel (1996–1997)
- Duration: 1986–1991; 1996–1997; 1999–2008; 2010–2012
- First appearance: June 1986
- Last appearance: December 3, 2012
- Created by: Lorraine Broderick and Wisner Washam
- Introduced by: Jorn Winther (1986); Francesca James (1996); Jill Farren Phelps (1999, 2001, 2010); Jean Dadario Burke (2000); Frank Valentini (2012)
- Crossover appearances: General Hospital; One Life to Live
In-universe information
- Other names: Antoinette Patterson Chandler; Skye Patterson; Toni Kinder; Skye Quartermaine
- Occupation: Former Partner with Luke Spencer in the Haunted Star casino ELQ board member Former Owner of Club 101; Formerly Starr Manning's nanny Former Styles editor at The Banner newspaper Former Research assistant at Tempo magazine Former Lounge singer
- Family: Quartermaine (adoptive); Chandler (foster)
- Mother: Rae Cummings
- Adoptive parents: Adam Chandler (foster); Althea Patterson (foster)
- Adoptive father: Alan Quartermaine
- Stepmother: Monica Quartermaine (adoptive)
- Half-brothers: A. J. Quartermaine (adoptive); Jason Morgan (adoptive); Andrew Cain (adoptive); JR Chandler (foster); Miguel Reyes (foster)
- Half-sisters: Emily Quartermaine (adoptive); Hayley Vaughan (foster); Anna Chandler (foster); Colby Chandler (foster)
- Spouse: Tom Cudahy (1987–88); Jonathan Kinder (1992–96); Ben Davidson (1998–99); Jasper Jacks (2002)
- Daughters: Lila Rae Alcazar
- Grandparents: Marcello Angelini; Myrtle Fargate; Edward Quartermaine (adoptive); Lila Quartermaine (adoptive)
- Uncles: Bradley Ward (adoptive); Jimmy Lee Holt (adoptive); Stuart Chandler (foster)
- Aunts: Tracy Quartermaine (adoptive); Lottie Chandler (foster)
- Nephews: Michael Corinthos (adoptive); Jake Webber (adoptive); Danny Morgan (adoptive); Enzo Santos (foster); AJ Chandler (foster)
- Nieces: Emily Cain (adoptive)
- First cousins: Justus Ward (adoptive); Austin Gatlin-Holt (adoptive); Faith Ward (adoptive); Ned Quartermaine (adoptive); Dillon Quartermaine (adoptive); Ross Chandler (foster); Scott Chandler (foster)

Skye Chandler is a fictional character from the ABC soap operas All My Children, One Life to Live, and General Hospital. Initially portrayed by Antoinette Byron, the role was then portrayed by Robin Christopher for most of the next 25 years, with the exception of the mid-1990s, when Carrie Genzel portrayed the character.

After her final departure from All My Children in 1997, the character crossed over to One Life to Live, appearing for two years until 2001 when she joined General Hospital for another seven years until 2008. Christopher went on to reprise the role in 2010 and 2011, before returning once again on November 21, 2012.

== Storylines ==
=== All My Children ===
Skye arrived in Pine Valley as a singer and it was discovered that she was Adam Chandler's daughter by his first wife. She became the protector of her uncle Stuart Chandler (who seemed to be the only human being able to love and understand her). She had an affair with Tad Martin before "settling down" and marrying Tom Cudahy. As part of an AIDS hate group, Skye discovered she was unwittingly responsible for funding a plot to burn down the house where AIDS victim Cindy Parker lived with her son, Scott. When she learned there was a chance Cindy could still be in the house, Skye broke down the door and braved the flames to rescue her. It turned out Cindy had taken sleeping pills rendering her unconscious and unable to save herself. After regaining consciousness, Cindy told Skye that Scott may still be in danger. Skye went back to check for the boy but instead ran in to the arsonist, who clubbed her over the head and left her for dead. She was soon rescued by Charlie Brent but as a result of the smoke and the blow to her skull, Skye fell into a coma for over three months. She regained consciousness, but upon doing so she learned that her husband Tom had grown quite fond of her friend and former boss, Barbara Montgomery. So, Skye decided to continue pretending to be in a coma, and began lurking through the secret passages in the Chandler mansion to spy on everyone. Eventually, she "awoke" from her coma, but then faked paralysis in a futile attempt to guilt Tom into stay with her. When she learned Tom and Barbara were still seeing each other, she kidnapped Barbara, an action that prompted Tom to have Skye committed to the Oak Haven sanitarium, where she flirted with fellow patient Travis Montgomery, though it didn't lead to anything serious.

Skye's eventual release from Oak Haven was conditional on her resuming her residence in the Chandler mansion with her father, Adam. During that time, it was revealed that Adam had an affair with a young woman in his employ, Dixie Cooney, who was now pregnant with his son. When Skye confronted her father over his infidelity to his then wife Brooke, she came face to face with his obsession over having a male heir. She was wounded at first that her father could place such vital importance on the Chandler heir being male when he had a full grown healthy daughter right in front of him, but she tried her best to remain supportive, at least on the surface.

Adam's plan for a male Chandler heir necessitated his marriage to Dixie before the child's birth, to assure the heir's legitimacy. Skye, relatively fresh out of divorce from a loveless marriage to Tom, was fearful of watching her father trap himself in a similar situation. On the day of the wedding at the mansion, she made one last ditch effort to talk him out of going through with the nuptials, but ended up being banished from the ceremony. Distressed by her father's rejection, Skye ran out of the house and into a thunderstorm going on outside, soon enough being struck by lightning. Fortunately, Tad Martin (who happened to be on his way to stop the wedding for his own reasons) witnessed the incident and was able to carry her out of the storm and into the house just as the wedding ceremony ended. Dr. Joe Martin was quickly called to tend to her and deemed Skye well enough to recover at the mansion. Grateful for her rescue, Skye became friends with Tad and a sometimes reluctant ally in his plan to break up Dixie's marriage to Adam before the baby could be born. Though Skye loved and was loyal to her father, she knew him well, and judged that once the baby was born he would get rid of his new wife one way or another.

Despite Tad's best efforts, Dixie eventually gave birth to Adam Chandler Jr. while still married to Adam. Skye was initially distant from her new little brother. Before he was born, she had confessed to Tad that she was even a little jealous of him. That jealousy soon turned to resentment when Adam completely forgot Skye's birthday on account of Adam Jr's christening, which was happening at the Chandler mansion the day after. Skye couldn't even stand to be in the same room as the baby and announced she would not be in attendance for the occasion. She instead went out and got so drunk that Tad had to bring her home. Upon their arrival, the christening was still going on. Skye immediately took the opportunity to go on a drunken tirade that culminated in a declaration to all in attendance that she hated the baby. Adam, in swift response, told her that she was no longer welcome under his roof. She went upstairs to pack her things and left with her friend, Nico Kelly.

That same night, Adam Jr was kidnapped and held for ransom. Skye quickly became one of the prime suspects on account of the scene she made at the christening. When Tad confronted her, she denied having anything to do with it. Other suspects were Sean Cudahy, Karen Parker, and Marcia the maid. However, during his investigation, Tad discovered the baby in Skye's motel room and she was arrested soon after. Just about everyone believed Skye was the kidnapper based on the incriminating evidence. Adam disowned her and refused to even take her phone calls from prison. Eventually, thanks to Tad, the real kidnapper was revealed to be Karen Parker, who was apprehended while attempting to flee the country with the ransom money. After Skye was released from prison, she was unable to forgive her family for believing she could kidnap her own brother and decided to leave town for a while.

Skye spent some time in New York, drowning her feelings in parties and alcohol before returning to Pine Valley where she soon took up with resident do-gooder, Jeremy Hunter. However her eternal feelings of inadequacy and not being able to live up to Jeremy's expectations led her to drink, and she became an alcoholic. After successfully overcoming her addiction, her father, Adam, concocted a plan to use Skye to spy on his old enemy Palmer Cortlandt. Adam wanted Skye to date Palmer's nephew Will and thereby learn corporate secrets that would allow him to destroy his rival. Little known to them Palmer had the same idea to use Will to gain information on Adam through Skye. Slowly, the two spies fell in love and convinced their families that no useful information could be gained by continuing this maneuver. Adam and Palmer then forbade them from seeing each other, forcing them to set up secret meetings. Eventually, both Adam and Palmer reluctantly accepted their relationship. However, when Will was suspected of poisoning Palmer, Skye admitted to Will that she wasn't sure whether or not he was telling the truth about having nothing to do with it, and broke off their relationship. Skye ignored Will's pleas for her to stay in Pine Valley and decided to move to Minnesota to work with recovering addicts. (Will was later cleared after Skye had left town).

In an "off screen" development, Skye (now played by Carrie Genzel) left for New York City where she met and married the villainous Dr. Jonathan Kinder. Upon finding out that Kinder was using experimental drugs on, and subsequently killing, his patients, Skye planned to report Jonathan to the authorities. Kinder found out, drugged her, and locked her up. When Kinder came to Pine Valley, he brought Skye along with him and hid her in a mansion outside of town. In a twist of fate, fellow town pariah, Janet Green, was captured by Jonathan when she became suspicious of him when she was his secretary, and found that Skye was being held captive. Janet didn't know that Skye was Adam's daughter because she was going by the name Toni- presumably short for Antoinette. While Janet went for help, Skye stumbled onto the Marick Estate and the Hunting Lodge. On this particular night, Dimitri was having an affair with his sister-in-law, Maria.

Subsequent to her gained freedom, Skye was introduced to Edmund Grey. Skye remembered seeing Dimitri and Maria making love, and Skye developed a crush on Edmund. Skye's crush turned to obsession. She thought if she could split up Edmund and Maria, Edmund would be hers. Skye bribed a lab tech, got access to Maria's paternity test and changed the father's name from Edmund to Dimitri.

After the birth of Maria's baby, Maddie, Dimitri was still believed to be the father of the child. Edmund never gave in to Skye's advances and got back together with Maria to raise Maddie. Skye made a promise to herself to tell Edmund that the baby was his. She tried telling him, but she just couldn't bring herself to say it, so she wrote it in a letter and sent it to Maria. Maria did not read it until she was on a plane on her way back to Pine Valley. Maria never got the chance to tell Edmund the good news; the plane crashed and Maria was killed. After Edmund returned home from the hospital, Skye devoted her time to helping him out. Little did she know that he was losing his hearing from time to time. Every time she tried to tell him about the paternity test, he couldn't hear her. Dimitri ended up suing Edmund for custody of Maddie and won. Dimitri took Maddie to the hospital for a check up and found out that Maddie's blood type was different than his; Maddie could not be his biological daughter. Dimitri found out that Skye had changed the paternity test and threatened to kill Skye if she told Edmund about the results swap. Dimitri ended up taking Maddie to Vadzel, his family castle in Budapest. While in prison, Erica revealed that Skye was up to something and she did everything in her power to find out what it was she was doing. Skye confessed that she'd switched the results. Edmund was crushed. He couldn't believe that he'd taken Skye into his life. Skye enlisted the help of her father, Adam, to help her make a clean escape from Pine Valley. Adam urged her to stick around and fight to clear her name. She didn't have the strength to fight and seemingly vanished into thin air-with the help of her dear ole dad.

=== One Life to Live ===
Skye showed up in Llanview in July 1999 at the request of Asa Buchanan. Asa hoped that she would help him destroy his enemy, Ben Davidson. Skye did this by using Asa's money to bribe a member of the Nevada Medical Board to revoke Ben's medical license. Skye got a job at The Banner, one of Llanview's newspapers, as Styles Editor and became friendly with the publisher, Viki Carpenter. She seemed especially interested in Viki's romantic relationship with Ben Davidson. The reason for this soon became clear. At a party, in front of all of Viki's friends and family, Skye announced that she was Ben Davidson's wife. Ben had thought the marriage was over, since they had filled out annulment papers, but Skye never filed them. Skye resisted all of Ben's attempts to get her to sign divorce papers and dropped another bombshell on Ben. The reason she didn't file for the annulment was that she was pregnant and they have a son together. But Skye soon admitted she was lying; they did not have a child, she just said that to try to hold onto him. Skye eventually agreed to sign the divorce papers and Ben was free to be with Viki.

Skye did not give up on her revenge plot against Ben, though, and blackmailed Max Holden into helping her destroy Ben's life. Skye learned that Max was not the real Buchanan heir and had proof to show the identity of the real heir. Max slept with Skye to convince her to keep quiet about the secret and Skye did keep the secret. She did not, however, keep the details of her relationship with Max a secret. She told Blair about it and Max subsequently left Skye. When Max saw that Blair was out to get him, he quickly put Skye back into his life to keep Blair in line.

Skye was arrested for shooting Max in the back. She was not guilty, however. Blair had shot Max and then Todd had placed the gun in Skye's room to make her look guilty. Skye got some unexpected support from police detective John Sykes, who was dating Rae Cummings and had learned that Skye was Rae's daughter. He convinced her to take a lie detector test, which she passed, and it was enough to get her out on bail.

Skye helped Max with his plan to get Todd to turn on Blair and admit that Blair was the one who shot Max. Max drugged Blair and made it appear they were sleeping together and made sure that Todd saw them. Their plan worked, but they got more than they bargained for. Not only did Todd admit that Blair shot Max, he also announced to a room full of people that Skye was really Rae's daughter. Skye didn't believe it at first, but after Adam came to visit her and admitted that Althea had adopted her as a baby, she knew it was the truth and wasn't happy about it. Once she was cleared of all charges by the D.A., Skye went to see Max and dumped him.

=== General Hospital ===
Skye followed her mother, Rae, to Port Charles in search of her father. Rae showed up at the vow renewal ceremony for Alan Quartermaine and his wife, Monica, where it was revealed that Alan's father, Edward, had paid for the baby (Skye) to be taken away, while both Alan and Rae were told the baby died. Alan and Edward welcomed Skye, but the rest of the family was not so kind. Skye promptly gave Emily to leave town because she was jealous of Emily's closeness with Alan. Alan was furious, but the two later reconciled. Skye's new brother A. J. Quartermaine, blackmailed her, but as they grew closer, A. J. and Skye began to work together to get A. J.'s son Michael back from A. J.'s ex-wife, Carly.

Skye soon fell for the corporate raider, Jasper Jacks, who seemed to be the only one able to understand her and care for her despite the things she did to others. When Jax told her that he didn't feel capable of loving a woman again, Skye took it as a challenge. She created several excuses for Jax to come to her rescue, including faking harassment by Sonny Corinthos. When she swam through the frigid waters of the lake to escape the boat house, Jax found her nearly frozen onshore and used his body heat to warm her. They became a couple shortly thereafter. Wanting to take Jax down, Edward played on Skye's insecurities about her relationship, and Skye signed an agreement to use to her relationship with Jax to steal information about his family's holdings. When Jax proposed, Skye wanted out of her deal with Edward, but he threatened to expose their deal to Jax. While Edward was in a coma after suffering a stroke at Skye's engagement party, Ned found a copy of the contract and forced Skye to tell Jax the truth. Jax dumped Skye and she went on a drinking binge. She woke up in Edward's room and saw the plug on his respirator had been pulled. Fearing she had done it in a drunken stupor, and afraid of being arrested for murder, Skye went into hiding. After tricking Edward into "waking up" from his fake coma and confessing he had pulled his own plug, Jax found Skye and told her she was off the hook. He eventually forgave her, and the pair resumed their engagement.

After Skye and Jax exchanged vows, Jax's supposedly dead lover, Brenda, showed up to congratulate him. She wasn't dead after all, and had stayed away from Port Charles due to her mental illness. Jax later got shot while protecting Brenda and was temporarily paralyzed. Skye finally met Brenda in person when she found her sitting at Jax's bedside. Upset and jealous at first, Skye was somewhat relieved to learn Brenda was dying and didn't plan to try and win Jax back. Jax didn't feel it was right tying Skye to a crippled husband, so he enlisted Brenda's help in pushing her away. Hurt, Skye looked into Brenda's prognosis, and discovered that the doctor who had diagnosed Brenda's illness had been paid off by Luis Alcazar to falsely declare Brenda mentally ill. Skye kept the information to herself, but when Jax found out Brenda wasn't dying and Skye knew, he demanded a divorce, wanting to be with Brenda. Skye started drinking again. The night of Jax and Brenda's engagement party, Skye and Alcazar were both thrown out and ended up in bed together at his hotel suite. When Skye woke up, she heard Brenda arguing with Alcazar in the next room before passing out again. She awoke later to discover Alcazar had been pushed off the balcony to his death. Seeking revenge on Brenda, Skye told the police she saw Brenda kill Alcazar, but her constant state of drunkenness discredited her testimony. Skye later became the prime suspect, but eventually remembered seeing Alexis Davis push Alcazar.

Still wanting Jax back, Skye showed up at his wedding with a gun in her purse, prepared to shoot the bride. She watched in awe as Jax told Brenda at the altar that he couldn't marry her because she'd kissed Sonny the night before. Although Jax didn't return to Skye, he did come to her rescue a few more times. When Tracy Quartermaine came to town to blackmail Skye with the truth that she wasn't a Quartermaine after all, Jax tried to charm Tracy into revealing the proof behind her claim. Skye told the family, and Alan surprised them all by stating that Skye would always be his daughter. When Rae confirmed Tracy's allegations, Skye disowned her mother. Jax tried to cheer Skye up by getting Ned to offer her a job at ELQ. Alan later legally adopted the adult Skye as his own child.

After bonding with Kristina Corinthos-Davis during her kidnapping, Skye decided she wanted a child of her own. Devastated to learn that she wouldn't be able to carry a baby to term, Skye became somewhat fixated on Ned and baby Kristina. She became a sort of surrogate mother for Kristina since Alexis was allowed custody. Skye tried to get Alexis out of Kristina's life for good by bringing over Alcazar's lookalike brother, hoping Alexis would freak out. Alexis didn't react, and Skye became suspicious that she was faking her illness. When she figured out the new Quartermaine butler was really Alexis in disguise, Skye tricked Alexis into revealing everything, including faking her illness, to the judge. Alexis retaliated by getting her brother Stefan to discredit Ned so Alexis would gain custody of Kristina. When Ned dropped his petition for custody, Skye dumped him and moved back to the lake house she had shared with Jax.

Luke Spencer then convinced Skye to help him hide out from the cops at the lake house, and they teamed up to scam the Quartermaines out of money so Luke would have some cash to go on the run with. When Luke got the Dead Man's Hand, Skye doubted their worth until Jax returned to town in pursuit of them. She tricked Luke and gave Jax one of the cards Luke had stolen from A. J. Skye was less than thrilled to learn of Jax's new relationship with Sam McCall. After the hunt for the Dead Man's Hand ended in John Jacks's death, Skye became partners with Luke and Sam in a new casino on the ship, the Haunted Star. Luke then managed to dupe Sam out of her ownership of the boat. When he used money he'd found hidden on the ship to fund the new casino, Faith Rosco showed up, claiming the money as hers, making her a partner in the casino. When Luke took off right before opening night, Skye was forced to work with Faith by herself. In order to protect Luke and herself from Faith, Skye had Justus draw up a contract which she made Faith sign it.

Luke finally returned to town, and Skye chewed him out for leaving her to deal with opening night. When a fire broke out at the PC Hotel, Skye found Luke unconscious in a janitor's closet. Once she'd revived him, Luke took charge of the chaos and everyone drew numbers for the order they would be rescued by helicopter. When it was Luke's turn to leave, Skye gave him a passionate kiss goodbye. After the fire was over and they were both safe, they tried to pretend the kiss never happened. Before the fire, Edward had altered his will to make Skye his sole heir despite not being a real Quartermaine. Shocked by the news, Skye nearly fell off the wagon, helped by Tracy, who wanted ELQ for herself. Luke snapped Skye out of it and she vowed to take Tracy on sober. Justus and Tracy persuaded Edward to act senile in order to escape liability for the fire at the hotel. Tracy tried to take advantage of the situation by having Edward committed, but Edward escaped and Skye and Luke hid him at the lake house.

Skye eventually realized she and Luke were not destined to be together, and she moved on with Lorenzo Alcazar. At first, the relationship was casual, but they both began to open up to each other. When a deadly virus swept Port Charles and Skye fell ill, Lorenzo switched Skye's medical chart with Lulu Spencer's so Skye would receive one of the few doses of antidote the hospital had. Skye initially resented Lorenzo for risking Lulu's life for hers, but eventually she forgave him and they resumed their relationship. Later, Skye was given a miracle when she became pregnant with Lorenzo's baby. Realizing the gift she had been given, Skye was determined to protect her child from the violence surrounding Lorenzo. With Robert Scorpio's help, Skye fled the country so she could have her in peace and live in safety far from Lorenzo's reaches. However, Lorenzo caught up with Skye just as she went into labor. After the birth of her daughter, Lila Rae, Skye realized she had no right to deny Lila a relationship with her father. To protect that connection, Skye would make some heartbreaking decisions that would drive a deep rift through her family.

When one of Lorenzo's associates took the Metro Court hostage, Skye protected Lorenzo. Inside the Metro Court, Skye's father, Alan, suffered what would prove to be a fatal heart attack. Believing Lorenzo had amnesia, Skye stepped up to temporarily run Lorenzo's organization, putting both her and Lila in a very dangerous situation. Skye was devastated by Alan's death, and the realization that Lorenzo had lied to her and also that he did not fully trust her. She decided to leave Lorenzo, but he was not going to let her take their daughter. He had Lila spirited out of town and refused to tell Skye where she was. Desperate to protect her daughter from Lorenzo's upbringing, Skye turned to Lorenzo's rival, Sonny Corinthos, and her brother, Jason Morgan for help. While Jason and Skye were anything but close, they were united by their love for Alan and wanting Lorenzo to pay for his role in his death. Skye pretended to reconcile with Lorenzo until he brought Lila home. On the eve that Lorenzo intended to take Skye and Lila out of the country to start their new chapter as a family, Skye let Jason into their home. She was singing Lila a lullaby in another room while Jason shot and killed Lorenzo. Then Skye took her daughter and left town.

In March 2010, Skye returned to gain access to Lorenzo's funds so she could give Lila the life Skye believes she deserves. She helped Kristina come to terms with her abusive boyfriend and apologize to Ethan for having set him up. She then enlisted Jax's help in getting Lorenzo's money in Barcelona. While abroad, the two reconnect and Skye admitted that she hoped for a second chance with him. Jax told her he wanted to try to save his failing marriage to Carly, and focus on his daughter. They shared a touching goodbye and Skye soon left town to reunite with Lila, Lorenzo's money in hand.

In August 2011, Skye was mysteriously summoned by Sonny's enemy, Anthony Zacchara to help him blackmail Tracy and try to steal from ELQ. Skye helped him, despite being reluctant to hurt Edward. She then found Jax unconscious amid a parachute, and helped him leave town undetected after faking his death.

Skye returned once again on November 21, 2012, for Edward's memorial service. She was surprised to learn that her brother A. J. is alive and was saddened by the deaths of Jason and Edward. Skye introduced Lila to the rest of the family, and when Tracy tried to tell her that she is not family, Skye told her that blood does not make family, love does. Heather Webber, who had once again escaped from Ferncliff, arrived at the mansion looking for Edward's will. She tried to kidnap Skye, but Alice knocked Heather out with a baseball bat. Skye helped A. J. in his takeover of ELQ.
