= Letters from a Killer =

- Directed by: David Carson
- Screenplay by: Nicholas Hicks-Beach; Shelley Miller
- Story by: John Foster
- Produced by: Bertil Ohlsson; Peter Snell
- Starring: Patrick Swayze; Kim Myers; Tina Lifford; Gia Carides; Olivia Birkelund
- Cinematography: John A. Alonzo
- Edited by: Lance Luckey
- Music by: Dennis McCarthy
- Distributed by: Lions Gate Entertainment
- Release date: August 21, 1998
- Running time: 104 minutes
- Countries: United States; United Kingdom
- Language: English

Letters from a Killer is a 1998 British-American crime drama mystery film starring Patrick Swayze. The film was directed by David Carson, and also stars Gia Carides, Kim Myers, Olivia Birkelund, and Tina Lifford. It was directed by David Carson and writing by John Foster, Nicholas Hicks-Beach, and Shelley Miller.

== Plot ==
A man is falsely convicted of the murder of his wife. During his time in jail, he finds comfort from four women with whom he corresponds. After his second court appearance, he is finally freed from prison only to be framed for two more murders which he did not commit.

== Cast ==
- Patrick Swayze as Race Darnell
- Kim Myers as Gloria Stevens
- Gia Carides as Lita
- Olivia Birkelund as Stephanie
- Tina Lifford as Elizabeth
- Elizabeth Ruscio as Judith Sutton
- Roger E. Mosley as Horton
- Bruce McGill as Brinker
- Mark Rolston as O'Dell
- Don Stark as Geary

== Production ==
=== Halting of filming ===
Letters from a Killer was originally supposed to be finished earlier than its release, but filming was halted for two months due to Patrick Swayze suffering serious injuries when he fell off his horse in May 1997 and hit a tree. He ended up with both legs broken and four tendons in his shoulder immediately became detached. Although it was eventually released, Swayze was reported to have trouble resuming his career.

=== Filming locations ===
- Echo, Utah
- Fair Oaks, California
- Ione, California
- Jordanelle Reservoir, Utah
- Los Angeles, California
- New Orleans, Louisiana
- Reno, Nevada
- Sacramento, California
- Salt Lake City, Utah
- Wendover, Nevada
- Woodland, California
- Glendora, California

== Reception ==
A review in TV Guide stated, "Convoluted and ultimately a bit silly, this thriller (the feature film debut of TV director David Carson) nevertheless puts an unusual spin on stalker movie conventions." The film is also described as follows: "A slightly melodramatic story about the relationship between a murderer sentenced to long prison terms and a woman in love with him. The feeling blossoms through correspondence. The costs, as for a small film, are high - 30 million dollars." The Filmjaarboek 1999 : alle bioscoopfilms van 1999 found it showed Swayze's "free fall to the B division".

The film is also noted as typical of a trend of Hollywood productions focusing on death penalty during the 1990s.
