= Brooke English =

- All My Children character
- Julia Barr as Brooke English
- Portrayed by: Elissa Leeds (1976); Julia Barr (1976–2013); Harriet Hall (1981–1982)
- Duration: 1976–2006; 2010–2011; 2013
- First appearance: March 10, 1976
- Last appearance: September 2, 2013
- Created by: Agnes Nixon
- Introduced by: Agnes Nixon and Bud Kloss (1976); Julie Hanan Carruthers (2010); Ginger Smith (2013)
- Crossover appearances: One Life to Live
In-universe information
- Occupation: Journalist
- Parents: Ed English; Jane Dobrin
- Adoptive mother: Peg English
- Spouse: Tom Cudahy (1981–1984); Adam Chandler (1987–1989); Tad Martin (1993–1994); Edmund Grey (2002)
- Children: Laura Cudahy; Jamie Martin
- Adoptive children: Laura Kirk English
- Aunts: Phoebe Tyler Wallingford
- First cousins: Lincoln Tyler; Ann Tyler
- Other relatives: Beth Martin

Brooke Allison English (formerly Cudahy, Chandler, and Martin) is a fictional character on the television soap opera All My Children. Originated by Elissa Leeds on March 10, 1976, she was portrayed by Julia Barr from June 1976 to June 1981 and from November 1982 to December 20, 2006. Harriet Hall played the role from June 1981 through March 1982. Barr made a special appearance as Brooke on January 5, 2010, as part of the series' 40th anniversary, and returned on February 23, 2010, for a two-month stint until April 23, 2010. She later returned for the show's final week on ABC on September 16, 2011. She returned as Brooke on the Prospect Park's continuation of All My Children.

Barr earned eight Daytime Emmy Award nominations for the role, and won twice in 1990 and 1998 for Best Supporting Actress.

== Storylines ==
In 1976, Brooke English arrived on the doorstep of Phoebe Tyler (Ruth Warrick), her aunt, as a wild teenager who was struggling to find her true love. She moved into the Tyler Mansion and started dating Dan Kennicott (Daren Kelly). She also continued to see her old boyfriend, the dangerous Benny Sago (Vasili Bogazianos). She pitted the two men against each other, and they fought for her affections. She was out of control, so much so that Phoebe nearly shipped her home. Benny had tried to blackmail Phoebe into letting Brooke stay.

Brooke soon stopped caring about Dan and Benny and fell for Tom Cudahy (Richard Shoberg). He was also being pursued by Erica Kane (Susan Lucci), and the two women's longstanding rivalry was born. Erica managed to win Tom's heart and he married her. Brooke returned to her relationship with Dan, where she was the mistress, as he was seeing Devon Shepherd.

Phoebe, faking paralysis, caught Dan and Brooke in a compromising situation, and threatened to throw out Brooke again. This was offset when Brooke found out about Phoebe's fake paralysis and blackmailed her into keeping her in the Tyler Mansion. Dan eventually broke up with Devon and wanted to try a relationship with Brooke again.

Brooke, however, soon started sleeping with Erica's half brother Mark Dalton (Mark LaMura). Mark made it clear that the relationship was only about sex. Dan discovered the relationship and left town. Brooke, still trying to find the right man, began an affair with Eddie Dorrance (Warren Burton), manager of singer Kelly Cole. He later ended up raping her. When he was killed, Brooke learned that was she pregnant with his child. She chose to terminate the pregnancy.

Brooke and Tom began to have an affair, as Tom had separated from Erica. When Erica returned from California as an unsuccessful actress, she convinced Tom to give their marriage another try. Her lies finally caused Tom to divorce her and propose to Brooke. The two married.

Brooke had slightly grown out of her teenage rebellious phase, and took a job as a reporter. She made the discovery that her mother, Peg English, was the leader of an international drug cartel known as The Cobra. It was yet to be revealed that Brooke was adopted. Her father and Phoebe's brother died and Peg was sent to prison. Before she could reveal who Brooke's real mother was, she was killed. This compounded onto the problem of Tom's drinking. He and Erica, Brooke's archrival, had an affair the night before Erica was to marry Adam Chandler (David Canary). This is while Brooke was pregnant with her and Tom's child. Brooke was helped through the pregnancy by Mark, and gave birth to a daughter, Laura Cudahy.

Brooke had become a rising TV anchorwoman, but ran into problems with this. She exposed a municipal scandal and refused to reveal her source, and was sent to prison. When she got out of prison, there was an assassination attempt on her and Mark's lives at a party. Erica's fiancé, Mike Roy (Nikolas Surovy), took the bullet instead of Brooke & Mark. Thinking that they were going to die during that ordeal, Mark and Brooke fell in love all over again. After a while, Brooke's busy schedule led to her break up with Mark.

She briefly dated Giles St. Clair, a stuntman. But his lifestyle was too wild and interfered with her role as Laura's mother. She also learned that her biological mother was a homeless woman named Jane Dorbin. Brooke tracked her down and the two built a relationship.

Brooke met one of Erica's exes, the wealthy Adam Chandler (David Canary). The two fell in love. Brooke married Adam quickly. Their happiness was very short-lived when Brooke's beloved daughter, Laura, was killed by a drunk driver. It is an event that stayed with Brooke for the rest of her life, as she continued to mourn the loss of her pride and joy.

When Brooke discovered that she could not bear any more children, Adam began to get anxious to have an heir to the Chandler fortune. He hired Dixie Cooney (Cady McClain), the niece of Palmer Cortlandt (James Mitchell), his bitter business rival, to be a nanny. He began to have an affair with her. She soon gave birth to his son, JR Chandler. The affair cost him his marriage to Brooke. They divorced, and Brooke began to work closely with Dixie's true love, Tad Martin (Michael E. Knight).

Tad and Dixie married after Dixie's brief marriage with Adam ended, but the marriage between Tad and Dixie also soon ended. When Tad and Dixie separated, he and Brooke had a brief affair. Tad was soon "killed" on a blown up bridge, fighting with Billy Clyde Tuggle. Soon after, Brooke discovered, much to her surprise, that she was pregnant! She told everyone that her pregnancy was because of artificial insemination to protect Dixie, after Tad had reconciled with her before he "died". She then told the citizens of Pine Valley that she was pregnant with his best friend and former husband, Tom Cudahy's child. Tom and Brooke led everyone to believe this which discouraged any thoughts that the baby might be Tad's because Brooke did not want to cause any more pain to Dixie.

While Brooke was pregnant, she began to rely on Jackson Montgomery (Walt Willey), another one of Erica's old flames. The two grew close in friendship. Brooke nearly lost her baby when she and Jack were hit by Arlene Vaughan (Phyllis Lyons), who was driving drunk at the time. Despite having to be cut out of her car, Brooke gave birth to a healthy baby boy, James Edward Martin, whom she called Jamie. Her miracle child has become Brooke's pride and joy, following the death of Laura.

Erica began to figure out a way to win Jack back. She prodded Brooke until Brooke saw that Jack still cared deeply for Erica. Brooke also went public with the fact that Jamie was Tad's son. Brooke continued to raise Jamie. She began to see Edmund Grey (John Callahan), whose hot and cold behaviour left her angry and his obsession with discovering his lineage and birthright strained the ties between them. Brooke experienced a jolt when Tad returned to Pine Valley in 1993. Tad wanted to become a good father to Jamie, and married Brooke.

Once again, Tad's love with Dixie would not be denied and they started to have another affair. Tad lied to Brooke about his whereabouts. Edmund knew the truth, and wanting to win back Brooke, he told her about Tad's affair in hopes of breaking up Brooke's marriage. Brooke vowed to stay with Tad. She became pregnant again, but tragedy would strike when it was discovered the pregnancy was ectopic. The termination of the pregnancy was necessary to save Brooke's life. Shortly after, Brooke realized that Tad would never love her the same way he loved Dixie, so she ended their marriage. Brooke continued to have a cordial friendship with Tad, as Tad became Jamie's father. Brooke began to focus on her career and raising her son.

Brooke was chosen as Pine Valley's Woman of the Year. At the ceremony, Laura Kirk (Lauren E. Roman), a homeless teen, publicly accused Brooke of not doing enough to help the cause of the homeless. Brooke vowed to do more. She began to work closely with Laura, and they developed a bond. Adam wanted Brooke back, but she was still reeling from their previous marriage, which ended when he had an affair with Dixie. She stayed away from him and guarded herself. Adam and Liza Colby put together a scheme for Brooke to return to Adam and for Tad to return to Liza. Brooke realized that she didn't love Adam enough to put up with him.

Brooke met and fell for Pierce Riley (Greg Wrangler) in 1996. He lived in the woods with Laura and Janet Green (Robin Mattson), an ex-con. When Pierce and Brooke began to date, Janet attempted to steal Brooke's identity as she also had feelings for Pierce. Her scheme didn't work. Brooke also brought Laura to her home and adopted her as her second daughter. However, Brooke wanted to devote more time to Jamie and Laura, so she broke up with Pierce. He left for New Mexico, but returned a few months later. Things began heating up between him and Brooke, and they became engaged.

But Pierce was a troubled man who was suffering from disturbing flashbacks that included gunshots and a woman from Pierce's past. He painfully confessed to Brooke that he may have shot the woman in the flashbacks. She urged him to seek help and gave her support while he underwent psychological therapy. Undergoing hypnosis, Pierce remembered that he fell in love with the woman in his flashbacks, Christina, in Central America. They had a daughter named Amelia. He also remembered being forced to shoot either Christina or Amelia by a soldier. The soldier pulled the trigger of the gun in Pierce's hands, shooting Christina. Pierce suffered a breakdown due to the memory, and Brooke vowed to look for Amelia.

No one knew that Christina was still alive. She survived the gunshot wounds and spent two decades in a Central American jail. When Brooke began looking for Amelia, the captors released Christina, who headed to Pine Valley under the name "Diana Martinez" to tell her story to the world-renowned reporter Brooke English. She didn't know that Brooke was in love with Pierce. When the truth was exposed, Pierce had to choose between Brooke and Christina. Pierce soon left Pine Valley with Christina, devastating Brooke.

Brooke devoted her time to her work. She was nominated for an award in New York. On the way home to Pine Valley, her plane crashed. Everyone aboard was killed except for Brooke, Edmund, his daughter Maddie Grey and another man. Brooke tried to save the life of Edmund's wife, Maria Santos Grey, but Maria made Brooke save Maddie's life instead. The plane went over the cliff and into the water. Maria's body was never found and was presumed dead, much to Edmund's sadness. While searching for the truth behind the plane crash, she met a man that would help her through the ordeal, as he was the fourth survivor, Jim Thomasen.

Jim had trailed Brooke from New York, because he knew that she was a wealthy woman and had just adopted Laura. Laura and Jim had a past in New York. Jim took pornographic pictures of Laura when she was younger. Laura had posed for the pictures for money to help take care of her sick mother, Terry Kirk. Laura discovered that the photos remained on the Internet.

Brooke teamed with Jim to find out about why the plane crashed. Jim was with her every step of the way, and they learned that the plane's crash was attributed to faulty turbine blades and that Adam Chandler was behind it.

Soon after, Laura was kidnapped by a drug addict named Ricky, who had posed in the pictures with Laura. He, unknown to Brooke, was hired by Jim. Brooke would find the pictures thanks to a tip-off and receive a ransom note demanding that the police were not to be notified about Laura's disappearance. She obeyed and told Jim she would drop the money herself. Jim "saved" Laura, became a hero in Brooke's eyes. Though she told Brooke that she knew Ricky, the former didn't tell her mother that Jim had been the photographer after declaring a truce with him to keep it a secret between themselves.

Wanting Brooke for herself, Jim told Laura that she should move to Boston where no one would know her. Laura would leave Pine Valley after the New Year's in 1998. Brooke was soon notified that there was new evidence in the plane crash. It was a luggage fragment that contained explosives.

Despite Jim's warning to leave it alone, Brooke wouldn't let it rest. While in Jim's apartment, she went through his closet trying to find something and stumbled across the same style luggage found in the wreckage. She confronted him, and he explained it with lies. Brooke hired Mateo Santos to do undercover work and find out as much as he could about Jim.

The truth about Jim shocked Brooke. She arranged a meeting with him at the Chandler Gallery. She showed him the photos of Laura that he had taken. Jim promised that if she called the police, he would take the same type of photos of Jamie. This drove Brooke over the edge and she took out a gun, shooting Jim several times in the back.

Scared about the murder charges and convinced that she wouldn't win the trial, Brooke went on the run with Jamie. Finally, Tad convinced her to return to Pine Valley and stand trial. Thanks to Tad's secret maneuvering, Brooke was able to get an acquittal of murder. However, the event still haunted Brooke.

Laura would soon leave Pine Valley to study in China. Brooke began to date Dimitri Marick, again another former love of Erica. Erica succeeded in quickly ending the relationship. After that Brooke began to refocus on her career and raising Jamie.

In early 2000, Brooke began working herself to the bone at the community centre. Reverend Eliot Freeman soon found that this was for the guilt she felt about Laura's death years before. It came to the surface when Arlene Vaughan was drunk and crashed her car into a telephone pole that broke through the community centre's wall. Eliot comforted and consulted Brooke about the pain that she was still holding for her daughter's death.

However, Brooke was unaware that Eliot had a secret he was keeping from her, his real identity. Before "finding God," Eliot went by another name, Josh Waleski. He was the man who had killed her daughter. Eliot was eventually forced into telling Brooke that he was the man who had taken her daughter from him. Brooke erupted in a fury and lashed out at Eliot for having lied to her for months. More importantly, Brooke was left to question herself for allowing herself to fall in love with the man who had killed her daughter. Eliot decided to leave town to help Brooke heal. Before Eliot left for good, Brooke finally found a way to forgive Eliot.

The next year, Brooke's adopted daughter Laura suffered an Ecstasy overdose. It aggravated a pre-existing heart condition. The only surgeon that could perform the risky operation was Dr. David Hayward, who was in prison. Brooke was helped by of all people, Erica, in order to free David. Laura survived the surgery but still needed a heart transplant.

That spring, Brooke begged Leo du Pres to pretend to be interested in the dying Laura in order to give Laura motivation to fight for her life. At first, Leo refused. But he soon grew closer with Laura. He seemed to really care for Laura and wanted to see her fully recover. Laura's condition would soon worsen, and Brooke paid a married couple to donate the heart of their dead nephew.

On June 18, 2001, Leo proposed to Laura, and she accepted. They married two days later in her hospital room with Brooke, with friends and hospital staff in attendance. Laura's health continued to worsen and the only way to save her life was for a heart transplant. Laura eventually received a heart transplant from Gillian Andrassy, who died after she was shot. In early 2002, Brooke convinced an unwinding Laura to seek out professional help.

Soon, Brooke began to suspect that Maria Santos Grey was still alive. She had seen a painting of Wildwind, the estate in Pine Valley that belonged to the Grey family, drawn by a Maureen Gorman. Brooke was convinced that Maureen Gorman was an alive Maria. She and Tad traveled to Nevada to find Maureen. When Brooke saw Maureen and realized it was indeed the long thought dead Maria, she fainted. Later that night, Tad went to find Maria, but saw a different girl and assumed that was who Brooke saw. He tried to convince Brooke that she just "thought" she saw Maria.

Brooke and Edmund finally married. At their wedding, Maddie saw Maria and followed her. She burst into the chapel moments later, announcing that she had been with her mother. This was just after the marriage ceremony was complete and Brooke and Edmund were officially married. Brooke finally admitted that she knew Maria was really alive, causing Edmund to find Maria. Their marriage was annulled, but Brooke continued to help Edmund reunite with Maria.

Following this, Brooke began an affair with Adam Chandler. Brooke told Adam that she would only continue the affair if it remained a secret. But soon Brooke realized that others knew about it, and she quickly ended the relationship.

Brooke began to rebuild her friendship with Edmund, after all of her deception. But she also began to worry about Jamie. Unknown to anyone, Jamie had slept with newcomer Babe Carey, the night before it was announced that Babe had married Jamie's former stepbrother JR (Adam Jr.) in San Diego weeks before. Both had been drunk, but Babe still took Jamie's virginity. Babe soon became pregnant, and Brooke worried that Jamie might be the father.

When it was revealed that the father of Babe's daughter, Bess, was indeed JR and not Jamie, Brooke was relieved. However, it was then figured out that Bess was really Miranda Montgomery, the newborn daughter of Bianca.

Brooke's world was rocked when Edmund was killed in the Wildwind barn one night. Brooke had to tell Maria that she was the executor of Edmund's estate, and had more control over Maria's children and the Wildwind estate than Maria. The two women remained at odds, until they found a way to co-exist for the sake of Maria's children.

When her Aunt Phoebe died, Brooke was inconsolable. She soon found out that Phoebe had left everything to Jamie provided he dumped Babe. Jamie had a tough time letting go of Babe but eventually did. Jamie would later start a relationship with the recently returned Amanda Dillon, but after Amanda's unstable mother Janet wreaked havoc on Pine Valley, Brooke welcomed a devastated Amanda into her home as if she were her daughter.

Eventually, Jamie and Amanda stopped seeing each other. Over the last couple of months in Pine Valley, Brooke remained in the background, focusing on raising Jamie and Amanda. She also became a stepping stone in the renewed relationship of Erica and Jack. While the two were separated, Erica invited her first husband Jeff Martin to Thanksgiving dinner, while Jack invited her bitter rival, Brooke. Brooke quickly realized that Jack didn't love her like Erica. Quietly, Brooke left Pine Valley at the tail end of 2006. However, Brooke reappeared in the All My Children 40th anniversary special four years later and on February 23, 2010, she returned until departing again exactly two months later. In that short period of time, Brooke and her ex-husband Adam Chandler went off into the sunset together in a particularly romantic happy ending.

In 2006, Barr was taken off contract and was asked to remain with the show on a recurring basis, but she declined the offer. The producers then decided not to recast the role after her departure. For many years prior, Brooke had floundered in the background. Her last major story was her interrupted marriage to Edmund Grey which occurred in 2002. Despite 30 years of service to All My Children, at that time neither Barr nor Brooke received any formal farewell; the character simply vanished, and was then mentioned only infrequently. When she left, Barr said, "I am so proud to have been a part of a show that was once a television icon."

Barr eventually returned in 2010, first with the All My Children 40th anniversary special in January, and then for a two-month stint from February to April during which time Brooke takes over as editor-in-chief of Tempo, is involved in a terrible car accident, and falls in love, all of which culminate with Brooke and her former husband Adam Chandler, reuniting and officially leaving town together.

Adam and Brooke returned to Pine Valley for the final episodes of the series in September 2011. They initially return to help a very troubled JR. Still a couple, Brooke is there with Adam when he discovers Stuart is alive and purchases the Chandler Mansion as a present for Adam with the inheritance money from her Aunt Phoebe after it is sold away from the family. The final scenes of the show take place in the Chandler mansion on September 23, 2011, during which Adam proposes to Brooke and she accepts.

Brooke is the first character to be seen in the reboot of the show. Adam re-proposes to Brooke, claiming she is the only woman he has ever truly loved, and she then accepts his proposal. She and Adam are the guardians of Adam's grandson, AJ Chandler as his dad, JR has been in a coma for five years. She has an assistant, Celia Fitzgerald, who volunteers with her at the Miranda Center. Brooke also agrees to take over as Head of Chandler Enterprises, because Adam is travelling so much and spends much of her time helping Adam to rebuild the company that JR ruined before he was shot.
