= Sullivan Walker =

American actor

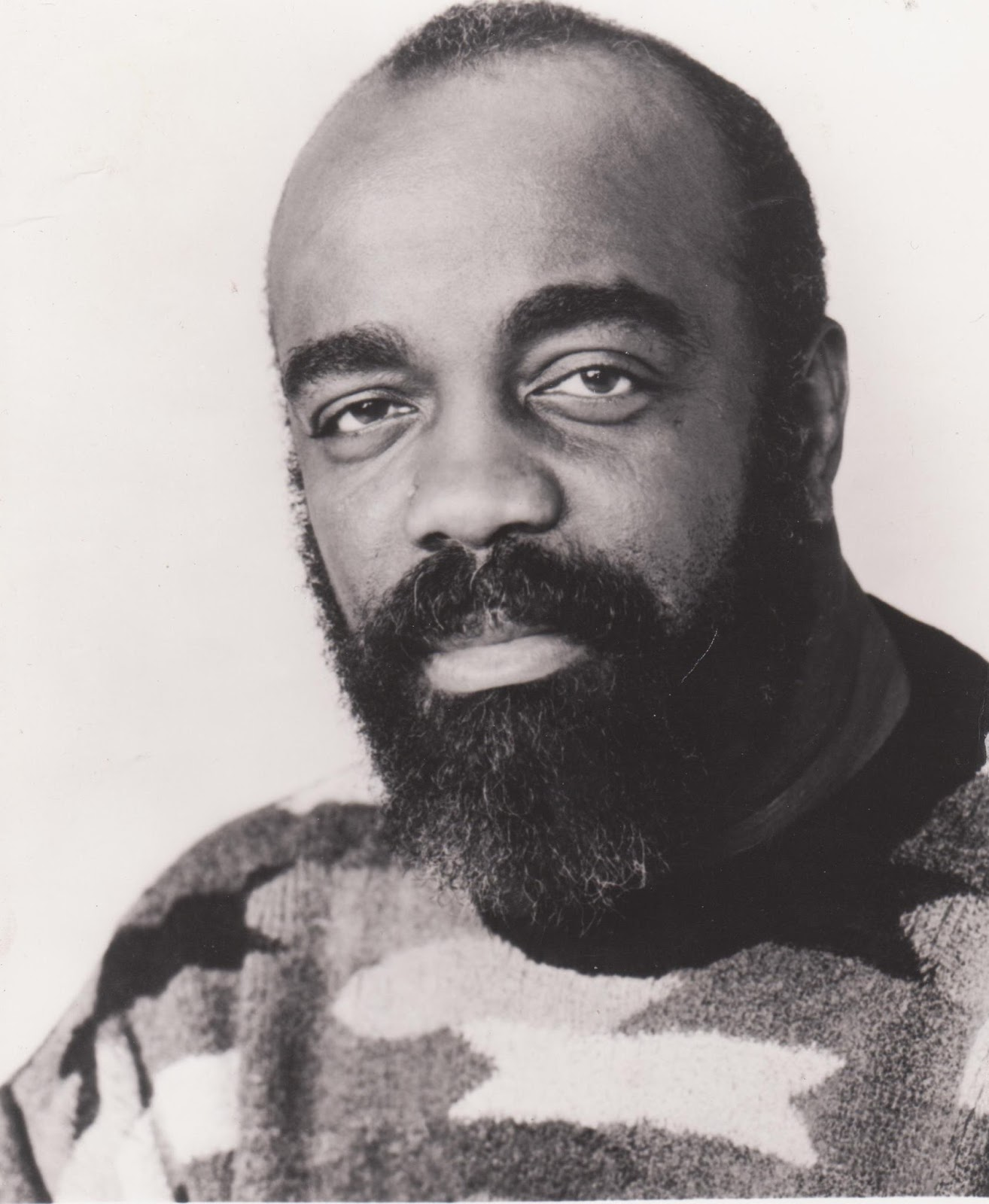
- Born: November 20, 1946; Laventille, Trinidad and Tobago
- Died: February 20, 2012 (aged 65); Los Angeles, California, United States
- Citizenship: United States^{[explain status]}
- Occupation: Actor
- Years active: 1967–2006
- Spouse: Carol Mark-Walker

Sullivan Walker (November 20, 1946 – February 20, 2012) was a Trinidad and Tobago actor who played numerous small and recurring roles on television shows from 1980 until 2005. Walker migrated to New York from Trinidad and Tobago in 1969 and became an actor, writer, director and teacher.

== Early life ==
Walker was born in Laventille, Trinidad and Tobago, on November 20, 1946. He was raised in Broadway in the city of San Fernando. He initially began a career as a teacher at St. Paul's Anglican School in San Fernando.

== Professional work ==
Walker acted in television shows, on The Cosby Show from 1988 to 1991 portraying Cliff Huxtable's physician friend, Dr. James Harmon. He guest-starred in episodes of The Pretender (1999), The Sentinel (1997), and Law & Order: Special Victims Unit (2004). He also played a bit part in several movies, including Crocodile Dundee (1986). His most significant role was in the 1994–95 show Earth 2, where he appeared in nearly every episode as Yale, a cybernetic advisor to Devon Adair (Debrah Farentino) and tutor to her son, Uly. His final role was in the 2005 movie Get Rich or Die Tryin'.

Outside of film and television Walker was also a Broadway actor, acting in August Wilson's Two Trains Running. Toward the end of his life, he endeavored to found a school/workshops for Caribbean actors in New York to succeed in the American film and television markets.

== Death ==
Walker died of a heart attack on February 20, 2012, in his home in Los Angeles, California, three months after his 65th birthday. Walker is survived by his wife, Carol Mark-Walker, and his daughter, Keela Walker. His remains were cremated.

== Filmography ==
Year	Title	Role	Notes
1980	The Exterminator	Drug Pusher	
1986	Crocodile Dundee	Tall Man	
1988-1991	The Cosby Show	Dr. James Harmon	4 episodes
1989	Runaway	K.C.	TV movie
1989	Misplaced		
1993	Where I Live	James St. Martin	21 episodes
1993	The Firm	Barry Abanks	
1993	The Fresh Prince of Bel-Air	Reverend Boyd	Episode: "'Twas the Night Before Christening"
1994-1995	Earth 2	Yale	21 episodes
1996	Lush Life	Hal Gardner	7 episodes
1996	Living Single	Dr. Booker Burghardt Mountebank	Episode: "Doctor in the House"
1997	On the Edge of Innocence	George Beaumont	TV movie
1997	The Sentinel	Watson	Episode: "Pennies from Heaven"
1999	The Pretender	Mutumbo	Episode: "Donoterase: Part 2"
2000	The Jamie Foxx Show	Homeless Man	Episode: "Musical Chairs "
2004	Law & Order: Special Victims Unit	Martin Bosa	Episode: "Ritual"
2005	Get Rich or Die Tryin'	Grandpa	
