= On the Edge of Innocence =

1997 television film directed by Peter Werner

- Genre: Drama
- Written by: Maxine Herman
- Directed by: Peter Werner
- Starring: Kellie Martin; James Marsden
- Theme music composer: Dana Kaproff
- Country of origin: United States
- Original language: English

Production
- Executive producers: Julie Cohen; Dan Wigutow; Joan Sittenfield; Jeni Munn
- Production location: Los Angeles
- Cinematography: Neil Roach
- Editor: Paul Dixon
- Running time: 90 mins.
- Production companies: Dan Wigutow Productions; Paramount Network Television Productions

Original release
- Network: NBC
- Release: April 20, 1997

On the Edge of Innocence is a 1997 American television drama film directed by Peter Werner. It stars Kellie Martin as a manic-depressive teenager. The film premiered on NBC on April 20, 1997.

== Plot ==
Despite being a straight A student, Zoe Tyler (Kellie Martin), a manic-depressive 17-year-old, constantly gets in trouble with her friends including Ann (Clea DuVall) due to angry outbursts caused by her refusal to take her medicine. One day, she skips school to hitchhike to San Francisco, California to visit her father at a piano concert. When the guy giving her a drive attempts to undress her, she screams and leaves the car, running back home where her mother Victoria (Karen Young) expresses her concern over her absence. In response, she runs away home to a nearby carnival, where she winds up dangling from a Ferris wheel. Her concerned mother decides that now something has to be done, and commits her daughter to a mental institution. Meanwhile, somewhere else Jake Walker (James Marsden), another 17-year-old, has difficulty respecting authority as well, even though he was raised by two forward, highly successful parents, one of whom is a respected lawyer, David (Terry O'Quinn). When he is not sleeping around with girls, Jake spends his day running away from the cops because of misdemeanors. One night, after a concert, he is arrested by the police and the judge advises for Jake to be in a juvenile facility. Preventing these hard measures to be done, David commits his son to the same mental hospital for a period of one month.

From the beginning, Zoe is pessimistic about her stay, feeling she does not belong in the institution. Nonetheless, she befriends Ally Winthrop (Lisa Jakub), a teenager who suffers from anorexia nervosa and constantly gets caught messing with her charts. When she is caught once again, Jake takes the blame and immediately becomes Ally's limelight, unlike for Zoe, who thinks that Jake is a low-life punk and rejects every attempt of him to get to know her. During her stay, Zoe meets the other patients, including the gay son of a military Luke (Jamie Kennedy), an extremely aggressive young man with family issues, Timothy 'Trader' (Vince Vieluf), and a teenager who still has imaginary friends, Sammy (Joshua Jackson).

Over time, Zoe takes off her shield and grows closer to Jake. Ally notices this, and acts out by throwing up her dinner, for which Zoe apologizes. Nonetheless, Zoe and Jake soon kiss, but are caught by councilman George Beaumont (Sullivan Walker), who reports the situation. Zoe and Jake are both informed that any emotional involvement with other patients is bad for their progress, and that they should not see each other any longer. They are put in other wards, but are able to meet without the guards noticing, with the help from their co-patients. Chief Barbico (Kevin Dunn) opposes to the romance, though Dr. Sharon (Olivia Birkelund) feels that two people filled with hatred opening up to each other could help them recover. Dr. Sharon's theory seems to be confirmed when splitting them up becomes the cause for continuing outbursts, one of them including Jake trying to strangle his visiting father for having an affair. When Sharon arranges a meeting between the two, Barbico fires her on the spot and orders the teens to say goodbye. Instead of listening, Jake threatens Barbico with a knife, and is able to escape the institution with Zoe, Ally, Luke and Timothy.

Whereas Ally is caught by the police, Zoe & Jake and Luke & Timothy split up after accidentally shooting a security guard who attempted to hold them. In a diner, Zoe and Jake find out that Timothy was arrested after returning to the scene of crime. Instead of following his steps, they steal a car and hit the road. A stop at her father (Ronald Guttman) for help to escape to Mexico proves unsuccessful, as he turns her into the police. Zoe and Jake leave with her father's wallet before the cops arrive, but are almost killed on the road when Zoe drives dangerously upon noticing that Jake is flirting with another woman. She attempts to apologize after her outburst, and then runs to a deserted carnival because of Jake's lack of understanding. He follows her and finds her climbing in the Ferris wheel. Promising her a future with him, Jake convinces her not to jump and get off safely. Afterwards, they voluntarily return to the institution, believing that they will still be with each other after treatment.

== Cast ==
- Kellie Martin as Zoe Tyler
- James Marsden as Jake Walker
- Karen Young as Mrs. Victoria Tyler
- Lisa Jakub as Ally Winthrop
- Jamie Kennedy as Luke Canby
- Vince Vieluf as Timothy "Trader" Wells
- Terry O'Quinn as Mr. David Walker
- Olivia Birkelund as Dr. Sharon
- Sullivan Walker as George Beaumont
- Jessica Harper as Mrs. Alice Walker
- Ronald Guttman as Mr. Joseph Tyler
- Kevin Dunn as Dr. Barbico
- Joshua Jackson as Sammy
- Clea DuVall as Ann
- Keili Lefkovitz as Cheryl
- Heath Lourwood as Griffin
- Johnny Strong as Squeamich
- Stephanie Allen as Gabriella Lewis
- Maclovio Perez as TV Anchor
- Lee Magnuson as Dr. Xavier
- Ken Kerman as Beach Patrol Cop
- Christine Renee Miller as Cindy
- Jim Cody Williams as Hippy Store Clerk
- Vince Grant as Mr. Penn
- Holly Martin Riddle as The Cashier

== Reception ==
People magazine wrote regarding the film: "Martin is convincing as an alarmingly mercurial personality, but this melodrama is less interested in characterization than in screaming matches, desperate clinches and breathless chases."
