= Grind (2003 film) =

2003 comedy film by Casey La Scala

- Theatrical release poster
- Directed by: Casey La Scala
- Written by: Ralph Sall
- Produced by: Bill Gerber; Hunt Lowry; Casey La Scala
- Starring: Mike Vogel; Vince Vieluf; Adam Brody; Joey Kern; Jennifer Morrison
- Cinematography: Richard Crudo
- Edited by: Eric Strand
- Music by: Ralph Sall
- Production companies: Pandora Cinema; Gaylord Films; Gerber Pictures; 900 Films
- Distributed by: Warner Bros. Pictures
- Release date: August 15, 2003
- Running time: 105 minutes
- Country: United States
- Language: English
- Budget: $6 million
- Box office: $5.1 million

Grind is a 2003 American sports comedy film directed by Casey La Scala, written and composed by record producer Ralph Sall and starring Mike Vogel, Vince Vieluf, Adam Brody and Joey Kern as four teenage aspiring amateur skateboarders on a road trip from Chicago, Illinois to Santa Monica, California in an attempt to get noticed by pro skateboarding legend, Jimmy Wilson, and get skateboarding sponsorships. The film received negative reviews from film critics and a box-office bomb, grossing $5.1 million against the budget of $6 million.

== Plot ==
After high school graduation, skateboarder friends, Eric Rivers, Dustin Knight, and, Matt Jensen, take one last Summer road trip together, with the goal of getting noticed by pro skater legend, Jimmy Wilson, on his demo tour. Following their dreams and Wilson's national tour, the trio start their own skate team, reluctantly sponsored by Dustin and his college fund.

Upon hiring Lou Singer to drive in his van, the members of Team Super Duper start their journey from Chicago to Santa Monica across the United States to realize their dreams of becoming professional skateboarders. In the process, they meet some professional skateboarders like Bucky Lasek, Bob Burnquist, Pierre-Luc Gagnon, Bam Margera and his crew, along with their friend Jamie the skater.

== Cast ==
- Mike Vogel as Eric Rivers
- Vince Vieluf as Matt Jensen
- Joey Kern as Sweet Lou Singer
- Adam Brody as Dustin Knight
- Jennifer Morrison as Jamie
- Jason London as Jimmy Wilson
- Summer Altice as Winona
- Bam Margera as himself
- Erin Murphy as Hot Mama
- Stephen Root as Cameron
- Christopher McDonald as Mr. Rivers
- Brian Posehn as Orville the Scraggly Guy
- Dave Foley as Tour Manager
- Jason Acuña as Little Timmy (as Wee Man)
- Donte Calarco as Buxom Girl #1
- Christine Estabrook as Sarah Jensen
- Randy Quaid as Jock Jensen
- Lindsay Felton as Denise Jensen
- Chad Fernandez as Rival Skater #1
- Alfred Briere as Rival Skater #2
- Ehren McGhehey as Rival Skater #3
- Brandon Mychal Smith as Teen Skater
- Jake Muxworthy as Pro
- Donald Gibb as Scabby Security Guy
- Shonda Farr as Sandy Moore
- Bob "Bobcat" Goldthwait as Bell Clerk
- Tom Green as Colorado Skate Shop Owner
- Ryan Sheckler as Rod St. James
- Guillermo Aguilar as himself
- Preston Lacy as himself
- Liam Booth as himself

== Production ==
Director and producer Casey La Scala grew up during the period of Dogtown Skating and credited it as being integral to his childhood. Following the resurgence of skateboarding popularity with the evolution of Street Skating in the 1990s as well as its role in the popular Jackass TV series, he was inspired to make a film about his experiences growing up in the skateboarding scene. He decided to make it a comedy inspired by the films he grew up with, particularly National Lampoon's Animal House and Revenge of the Nerds with the latter inspiring him to cast actor Donald Gibb as the "Scabby Security Guy". Though Scala was not typically one to find himself starstruck, Gibb proved to be an exception to this.

Initially, Scala was inspired to make the film as a comedic mockumentary inspired by This is Spinal Tap. As the script began to evolve, he opted instead to let it evolve into a more conventional narrative piece. The film entered production with a very loose script which featured a large amount of improvised dialogue and material that was created through "writing stuff in the car" on the way to set. He encouraged his cast and crew to "shoot what we have on the page" and then "just have fun with it".

Due to budgetary limitations, Grind was shot with two units running concurrently. Scala would direct main unit whilst a second unit overseen by Tony Hawk was setting up before skateboarding over to second unit to direct whilst the first unit would then set up for its next shot. He credits this style of directing with being able to keep the film on schedule and within the parameters of its small budget, as well as allowing him to accomplish up to 27 setups in a single filming day. The cast, however, were not allowed to skate on set due to the risk of production losing them to injuries as a result of them constantly attempting to land Ollies. Despite this, Scala claims the cast still became very good skaters by the end of filming.

During filming of Mr. & Mrs. Smith, Adam Brody contacted Scala to tell him that Brad Pitt had allegedly claimed Grind to be his favourite movie.

== Soundtrack ==
Grind

Soundtrack album by Various artists
- Released: August 12, 2003
- Recorded: 2003
- Genres: Alternative rock: hip-hop; nu metal; punk rock; pop-punk; reggae fusion
- Length: 61:55
- Labels: Atlantic; Bulletproof
- Producer: Ralph Sall

Professional ratings
Review scores
Source	Rating
Allmusic	3/5 stars

A soundtrack consisting of a blend of rock, hip hop and reggae music was released on August 12, 2003, by Atlantic Records and Bulletproof Records.

=== Track listing ===
1. "Too Bad About Your Girl" [Radio Mix] - 2:56 (The Donnas)
2. "Boom" - 3:07 (P.O.D.)
3. "Get Busy" [Clap Your Hands Now Remix] - 4:19 (Sean Paul featuring Fatman Scoop)
4. "I'm Just a Kid" - 3:18 (Simple Plan)
5. Ill Kid - Donkey Song -3:30
6. "Smoke Two Joints" - 2:39 (Sublime)
7. "Seein' Red" - 3:48 (Unwritten Law)
8. "No Letting Go" - 3:23 (Wayne Wonder)
9. "The Jump Off" [Remix] - 4:27 (Lil' Kim featuring Mobb Deep & Mr. Cheeks)
10. "These Walls" - 4:06 (Trapt)
11. "Poetic Tragedy" - 3:32 (The Used)
12. "More Than a Friend" - 4:25 (All Too Much)
13. "Look What Happened" - 3:07 (Less Than Jake)
14. "99 Bottles" - 3:27 (SLR Whitestarr)
15. "Ay Dawg" - 3:06 (Jazze Pha)
16. "Fly from the Inside" - 3:55 (Shinedown)
17. "Goin' Down on It" - 4:52 (Hot Action Cop)
18. "Stupid Little Fellow" - 3:28 (The Peak Show)
19. "Pitiful" - 3:12 (Blindside)
20. ”Fever for the Flava” - 4:09 (Hot Action Cop)
21. "Line and Sinker" - 3:36 (Billy Talent)

== Release ==
Warner Bros. Pictures were hesitant to give Grind a wide release due to uncertainty regarding how popular the skateboarding scene was and the absence of major stars in leading roles. However, both test screenings received a highly positive response encouraging Warner Bros. to give it a wide release in 2,253 theatres on August 15, 2003.

The film ultimately opened in tenth place with a disappointing weekend gross of $1,079,295, facing stiff competition from Freddy vs. Jason and S.W.A.T. It ultimately grossed $5,123,696 domestically and $17,470 internationally, completing its run with a total worldwide gross of $5,141,166. It would later find a much larger audience on DVD.

== Critical response ==
On the review aggregator website Rotten Tomatoes, 8% of 72 critics' reviews are positive, with an average rating of 3.4/10. The website's consensus reads: "Mediocre skateboard stunts are padded by a half-baked plot and one-dimensional characters." Metacritic, which uses a weighted average, assigned the film a score of 30 out of 100, based on 24 critics, indicating "generally unfavorable" reviews.

Joe Laydon, of Variety called the "Skating scenes ... unremarkable and repetitious," concluding that the film was less than good.

Keith Phipps, for The A.V. Club, said "The film ... will gleam the cube only of viewers with an unusually high tolerance for porta-toilet and Dutch-oven gags."
