= Vince Vieluf =

American actor (born 1970)

- Born: Vincent Ernest Vieluf; November 10, 1970 (age 55); Joliet, Illinois, U.S.
- Occupation: Actor
- Years active: 1997–2010

Vincent Ernest Vieluf (pronounced Vee-loff; born November 10, 1970) is an American former actor. He is best known for his roles in Rat Race, Grind, and the short-lived UPN sitcom Love, Inc.

== Life and career ==
Vieluf was born in Joliet, Illinois, and spent most of his youth in Portland, Texas.

He has starred in such movies as An American Werewolf in Paris, Rat Race, National Lampoon's Barely Legal, and Grind. He also played in a made-for-TV movie called Snow Wonder. Vieluf has also appeared on the television hits ER and Friends.

In 2006 he had a role in the suspense thriller Firewall as vicious henchman Pim.

Vieluf played the dumbfound Blaine Cody in the 2001 comedy Rat Race. Before Rat Race, Vieluf appeared in An American Werewolf in Paris and Clay Pigeons. In 2006, Vieluf appeared as a jock version of Wolverine in the parody flick Epic Movie.

One of his television appearances (if not his first) was in 1997's On the Edge of Innocence. Vieluf made an appearance on the hit series Friends in 2001. His character, Ned, pretended to be in love with his professor Ross in order to pass a test. He is also a star in UPN's sitcom Love, Inc. as Barry, a wingman whose quirky ways and comments always stun the customers and employees. Vieluf made an appearance on the television series ER as Bernard Gamely.

He has also appeared in three episodes of CSI: Crime Scene Investigation playing Connor Foster in the episodes "Homebodies", "Ending Happy" and "Disarmed and Dangerous". Additionally, he appeared in the spinoff series CSI: Miami as Gil Callem.

Vieluf was the director and writer of the 2010 film Order of Chaos.

== Personal life ==
Shortly after his mother died in 2009, Vieluf quit acting in 2010 to be a "more grounded person", moving closer to his family and taking work at South Austin Beer Garden. He has disconnected from social media and continues dabbling in writing and music.

== Filmography ==
Year	Title	Role
1997	On the Edge of Innocence	Timothy 'Trader' Wells
1997	An American Werewolf in Paris	Brad
1998	Chick Flick	
1998	Clay Pigeons	Dep. Barney
1999	Sleeping Beauties	Vince
2000	Dropping Out	Andrew
2000	Everything Put Together	Jim
2001	Rat Race	Blaine Cody
2001	Friends	Ned Morse
2002	Four Reasons	Pharmacist
2003	Barely Legal	Tom Cooperman
2003	Grind	Matt Jensen
2004	Death Valley	Reno
2005	Snow Wonder	Mario
2006	Firewall	Pim
2007	Epic Movie	Wolverine
2009	The Immaculate Conception of Little Dizzle	O.C.
2010	Hysteria	Gabriel
