= Mateo Santos =

- All My Children character
- Mark Consuelos as Mateo Santos
- Portrayed by: Tito Ortiz (1994); Mark Consuelos (1995–2002, 2010); Kurt Caceres (2002)
- Duration: 1994–2002; 2010
- First appearance: March 8, 1994
- Last appearance: January 5, 2010
- Created by: Megan McTavish
- Introduced by: Felicia Minei Behr
In-universe information
- Occupation: Occasion producer of Wave; Co-Proprietor of Sounds of Salsa; Former Co-Proprietor of Holidays; Former waiter at the Valley Inn; High school baseball player
- Parents: Hector Santos; Isabella Santos
- Sisters: Maria Santos; Julia Santos; Anita Santos; Rosa Santos
- Spouse: Raquel Dion (until 1999); Hayley Vaughan (1997–1998, 2000–)
- Sons: Max Santos; Lorenzo Santos
- Nieces and nephews: Sam Grey (adoptive); Maddie Grey; Kathy Martin (legal)

Mateo Santos is a fictional character from the soap opera All My Children. He was first portrayed by Tito Ortiz in a guest appearance in 1994 but is best known as being portrayed by Mark Consuelos from 1995–2002. Consuelos temporarily returned as Mateo for All My Children's 40th anniversary on January 4–5, 2010.

== Storylines ==
From San Antonio, Texas, Mateo comes to Pine Valley in 1994 with his family. One night, Mateo stumbles upon a distraught Hayley Vaughan on the beach still in her wedding gown. Mateo and Hayley get to know each other and simply talk all night. The two remain friends even after Hayley decides to go through with a second ceremony to Alec MacIntyre.

Once Alec is sent to jail for trying to kill Hayley's mother, the two become engaged and move in together. Mateo and Hayley buy Hal's Bar together and rename it Holidays.

Mateo's old buddy from Texas, Tanner Jordan, soon shows up. Mateo gives Tanner a job at Holiday's as a waiter; schemer Tanner repays him by sabotaging Mateo and Hayley's relationship. Tanner's tricks to this end even include hiring someone to pretend to be Hayley's deceased stepfather.

Tanner gets Hayley to fly with him in a private plane to Texas under the pretense of "visiting" Mateo. Tanner claims the plane was in distress and feigns an emergency landing. He then drugs Hayley and rapes her. When a groggy Hayley protests, he claims it is consensual sex.

Mateo tracks Hayley and Tanner down to an abandoned cave. There is a struggle and Tanner is shot and dies. Mateo gets Hayley to a nearby hospital and the two are wed by a hospital chaplain.

Their wedded bliss is cut short when Raquel Dion, Mateo's first wife, shows up and she is not alone. She brings with her Mateo Jr. (referred to as Max), the son Mateo never knew he had. To add insult to injury, their marriage has never been annulled.

Raquel wants Mateo back. She tells Hayley that she and Mateo slept together since she came to town and goads Hayley, a recovering alcoholic, with Vodka. Hayley turns to Ryan Lavery for comfort.

Eventually, Mateo saves Hayley's life yet again, pulling her from a burning warehouse. The two reunite and remarry in June 2000.

Due to extremely high levels of lead in Hayley's system, Mateo and Hayley cannot start the family that they had originally planned. Arlene, Hayley's trainwreck of a mother, blows into town. She crashes their wedding reception and announces that she and Hayley's father have tied the knot. When it comes out that Arlene is pregnant, Mateo suggests adopting her baby. Arlene refuses, and eventually miscarries.

Later that year, during a launch party for Ryan's company, Incredible Dreams, everyone is drugged with a libido enhancing drug called Libidozone. Mateo is found in bed with Arlene; Hayley, having enough of her mother's antics, later strangles her. However, Mateo finds out that Hayley did not really kill Arlene: he finds proof in a newspaper article that Arlene faked her death. Mateo is hot on her trail to the Caribbean and drags her back to Pine Valley just in time to prevent Hayley from confessing in court that she had strangled Arlene to death.

Finally, Mateo and Hayley's dream to become parents comes true when a psychic that appears on her talk show tells her she is pregnant.

== Lifeline ==
- Mateo's birthday is January 4 [On-air celebration].
