= Adam Chandler =

Fictional character from daytime drama All My Children

- All My Children character
- Portrayed by: David Canary
- Duration: 1983–2011; 2013
- First appearance: 1983
- Last appearance: August 12, 2013
- Created by: Wisner Washam
- Introduced by: Jacqueline Babbin (1984); Ginger Smith (2013)
- Crossover appearances: One Life to Live
In-universe information
- Occupation: Businessman
- Family: Chandler
- Siblings: Lottie Chandler; Stuart Chandler
- Spouse: Althea Patterson (Backstory); Erica Kane (1984–1993) (Note: Adam and Erica were first married in 1984. When the couple "divorced" in 1985, it was Stuart who initiated the divorce making it invalid. Adam and Erica reunited and renewed their vows in 1991 and officially divorced in 1993.); Brooke English (1987–1989); Dixie Cooney (1989); Natalie Marlowe (1990–1991); Gloria Marsh (1993–1995); Liza Colby (1996–1997, 1999–2003) (Note: Adam and Liza married for the second time in 1999, and divorced in 2000. The couple re-married again in March 2001, and divorced in 2003.); Arlene Vaughan (2000); Krystal Carey (2005–2007); Annie Novak (2009–2010)
- Sons: JR Chandler; Miguel Reyes
- Daughters: Hayley Vaughan; Anna Chandler; Colby Chandler
- Adoptive daughters: Skye Chandler (foster)
- Grandchildren: Lila Rae Alcazar (foster); Enzo Santos; AJ Chandler
- Nephews: Ross Chandler; Scott Chandler (adoptive)
- Other relatives: Julie Rand Chandler (adoptive)

Adam Chandler is a fictional character from the ABC and The Online Network daytime drama All My Children, portrayed by David Canary from the autumn of 1983 through his departure on April 23, 2010, and briefly reprising the role for the series' final weeks on ABC in September 2011. Canary also appeared several different times on One Life to Live. Adam Chandler was one of the most devious and powerful individuals within the town of Pine Valley, Pennsylvania. He is a member of the powerful and wealthy Chandler family, residing at the Chandler Mansion (300 River Road).

Adam has been one of Pine Valley's most frequently married characters, but his most significant relationships have been with his sunny-natured artist twin Stuart, and his long-time business rival Palmer Cortlandt; although the feud quieted down when Palmer's appearances within the show significantly decreased.

Five of Adam's eight children have survived into adulthood; Skye Chandler Quartermaine, Hayley Vaughan Santos, JR Chandler, Miguel Reyes, and Colby Chandler. Through them, he has three grandchildren; Lila Rae Alcazar (Skye's daughter), Enzo Santos (Hayley's son), and AJ Chandler (JR's son). Alcoholism seems to run in the Chandler family, affecting Skye, Hayley and JR; Colby briefly followed the same path. His son JR was estranged from Adam because of his marriage to Annie Novak, and he started an affair with Annie to break up his father's marriage. This led to Adam Chandler leaving Pine Valley permanently (it is believed) in April 2010, to be with former wife Brooke English. After leaving town, Adam had his attorney and another ex-wife, Liza, serve Annie divorce papers.

Recognized beyond fiction, Adam has been cited by scholars as one of the "most powerful male figures in television", as well as one of its most complex villains, said to "combine ruthlessness in business and love with wit and sometimes true tenderness."

== Reception ==
In 2024, Charlie Mason from Soaps She Knows placed Adam 30th on his ranked list of Soaps' 40 Most Iconic Characters of All Time, writing, "Never let it be said that the Pine Valley power player portrayed by the late David Canary from 1983-2013 had no redeeming qualities. He had one: twin brother Stuart!"
