= Stuart Chandler =

- All My Children character
- Portrayed by: David Canary
- Duration: 1984–2009, 2011
- First appearance: 1984
- Last appearance: September 23, 2011
- Created by: Wisner Washam
- Introduced by: Jacqueline Babbin
In-universe information
- Occupation: Artist of locale repute Owns the Chandler Gallery, Used to own WRCW; Local volunteer at the Brooke English House
- Family: Chandler
- Siblings: Lottie Chandler; Adam Chandler
- Wife: Joanna Yaegar (1978–1983); Cindy Parker (1988–1989); Marian Colby (1999–)
- Adoptive sons: Scott Chandler
- Stepdaughters: Liza Colby
- Nephews: Ross Chandler; JR Chandler; Miguel Reyes
- Nieces: Skye Chandler (legal); Hayley Vaughan; Anna Chandler; Colby Chandler
- Other relatives: Enzo Santos (great); AJ Chandler; Julie Rand Chandler (adoptive); Lila Rae Alcazar (legal)

Stuart Chandler is a fictional character on American daytime drama All My Children. He was a member of the powerful and wealthy Chandler family. He was portrayed by David Canary from October 1984 to May 28, 2009, and for a brief return during the show's TV finale on September 23, 2011.

== Brief character history ==
=== Identical opposite ===
Stuart is the older identical twin brother to wealthy businessman, Adam Chandler. Stuart's personality is the opposite of Adam's. Adam is ruthless, unethical, and domineering; Stuart is kind, generous, and honest. This is reflected in their physical appearances: Adam always wears a business suit and keeps his hair slick and neat. Stuart wears colorful cardigans with slacks and has ruffled hair. Stuart often serves as his brother's conscience, attempting to sway Adam from some of his more heartless schemes. If pressured by others, Stuart will impersonate his brother Adam, although this ruse is usually quickly undone.

=== Relationships and career ===
Stuart was an artist, who taught art classes and ran a gallery in Pine Valley.

At the time of his apparent death, Stuart was married to Marian Colby, whose daughter, Liza, was married to Adam three times. Stuart's first wife was Joanna Yeager (Meg Myles), who served as Adam's assistant and who also had an affair with Adam. His second wife, Cindy Parker, died of AIDS-related complications, leaving Stuart with an adopted son, Scott Parker (now Scott Chandler).

=== Main role in Pine Valley ===
In Stuart's first appearances, Adam held Stuart against his will in the secluded West Wing of the Chandler mansion, due to misplaced anger at Palmer Cortlandt for allegedly murdering their sister, Lottie. After Stuart's release, he became a well-loved advice-giver in Pine Valley and a popular character for fans of the show.

=== Death ===
In celebration of Adam handing down his business to Scott, Stuart abandoned his trademark sweaters and slacks and donned a suit. In a tragic twist of fate, a number of Pine Valley's residents, infuriated with Adam, arrived at the Chandler Mansion armed with handguns. On May 15, 2009, Stuart was mistaken for Adam and was shot to death by one of these people.

After being arrested, Zach Slater confessed to Stuart's murder, but Jesse Hubbard doubted his claims and soon after, Kendall Hart was arrested for his murder. Immediately following her arrest, Stuart's funeral was held and all of his friends and family were in attendance. In honor of his memory, those who were in attendance sang "High Hopes", which was Stuart's favorite song and Scott shared a conversation he had with his father just following 9/11 about the power of love. Ryan, Erica, Aidan, and Kendall think that Annie killed Stuart. D.A. Henry North believed that Kendall killed Stuart.

He appeared to Kendall as a ghost twice; the first time to help her remember that she was the one who shot him, the second time to accept her apology and to say he can now rest in peace. He forgave Kendall and disappeared.

He appeared as an illusion to his twin brother, Adam, who, after collapsing from exhaustion at the dance competition, asked him if he had been shot too.

On October 22, 2009, Emma Lavery had a flashback and it is revealed that Adam shot Stuart (while he was in a drugged state, he was not aware of what had happened until much later).

=== End of All My Children ===
It appears that as part of David Hayward's Project Orpheus, Stuart did not actually die in 2009. Family gathers around Stuart at the hospital in joy that he was still alive. Adam and the Chandlers subsequently throw a party to welcome Stuart home. He is last seen talking with wife Marian right about to leave the hospital.

=== Post-All My Children ===
On the November 28, 2012, episode of General Hospital, Skye Chandler, in Port Charles for Edward Quartermaine's funeral, mentions that she will be visiting Pine Valley for Stuart's art show.

== Reception ==
In 2024, Charlie Mason from Soaps She Knows called Stuart the only "redeeming" quality of Adam.
