= David Canary =

American actor (1938–2015)

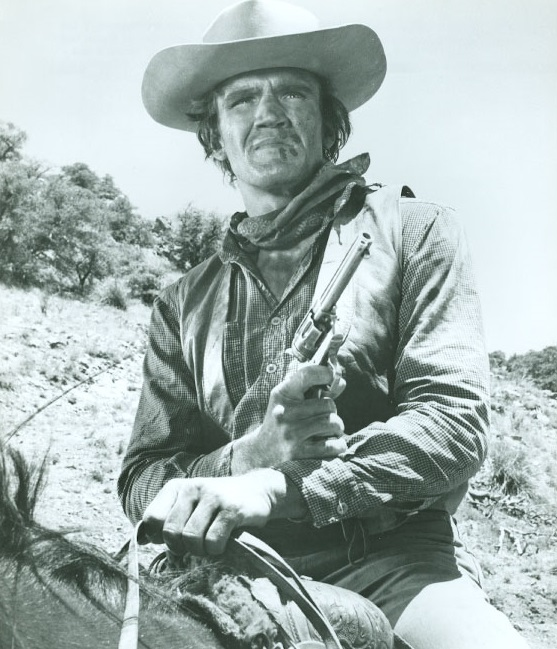
- Canary in Hombre (1967)
- Born: David Hoyt Canary; August 25, 1938; Elwood, Indiana, U.S.
- Died: November 16, 2015 (aged 77); Wilton, Connecticut, U.S.
- Education: University of Cincinnati
- Occupation: Actor
- Years active: 1965–2013
- Spouses: Julie M. Anderson (m. 1965; div. 1971); Maureen Maloney (m. 1982)
- Children: 3

David Hoyt Canary (August 25, 1938 – November 16, 2015) was an American actor. Canary is best known for his roles as ranch foreman Candy Canaday in the NBC Western drama Bonanza, and as Adam Chandler in the television soap opera All My Children, for which he received 16 Daytime Emmy Award nominations and won five times.

== Early life ==
Canary was born in Elwood, Indiana, and grew up in Massillon, Ohio. He was the middle son of Hilary Canary and Lorena Heal. His brothers were actor John Canary, who once had a role in All My Children, and writer Hilary Glenn Canary. The brothers were purportedly great-great-nephews of Martha Jane Canary, Calamity Jane.

== Football ==
Canary starred as an end on both offense and defense on the football team at Massillon Washington High School, where he graduated in 1956. The school honored him as a Distinguished Citizen 35 years later in 1991. He earned a football scholarship to the University of Cincinnati, where he was a three-year letterman from 1957 to 1959 and the recipient of the John Pease Award, as the program's best lineman, in his junior and senior years. Canary trained as a singer at the university's College of Arts and Sciences and received his bachelor's degree in music in 1960. He was picked by the Denver Broncos in the inaugural 1960 American Football League (AFL) draft. Commenting on the selection in a 2004 interview for the Archive of American Television, he said, "I thought they were out of their minds. I was 172 pounds, I wasn't very fast, and I couldn't catch a pass. They called me stone fingers."

== Career ==
Instead of signing with the Broncos, he opted to head to New York City to become an actor. He served two years in the United States Army, where he entered an All-Army Entertainment Contest in 1963. After ending his service, Canary moved to Los Angeles to continue his acting career.

After a semi-regular role as Russ Gehring in the primetime serial Peyton Place, Canary came to international prominence in 1967 on the Western series Bonanza. In 1967, he appeared in the now-classic Western movie Hombre with Paul Newman, Richard Boone, and Cameron Mitchell. Canary guest-starred in the two-part episode of CBS's Gunsmoke entitled "Nitro" (S12E28-29) as George McClaney, a poor man who found high pay creating nitroglycerin. He also played mobster Frank Gusenberg in the film The St. Valentine's Day Massacre and appeared on the short-lived CBS Western Dundee and the Culhane.

A contract dispute that year between Leonard Nimoy and the producers of Star Trek forced Herb Solow, Robert H. Justman, and Gene Roddenberry to compile a list of candidates for consideration to take over the role of Mr. Spock. As revealed in Solow and Justman's book, Star Trek - The Inside Story, Canary was one of these candidates.

David Dortort, the creator and producer of Bonanza, saw Canary in Hombre and cast him in the role of the new ranch foreman, Candy Canaday. Dortort said that Canary was "the kind of kid who comes on and suddenly, there's nobody else on the screen." Canary left Bonanza in June 1970 after a contract dispute. He returned in May 1972 after Dan Blocker's death. Canary said that he loved Bonanza, except for filming in Nevada in 100° heat.

Canary's most notable stage performance was on Broadway in the original production of Tennessee Williams's Clothes for a Summer Hotel, which starred Geraldine Page. A baritone, he also appeared on Broadway with Colleen Dewhurst in Great Day in the Morning, and he did numerous musical stage roles in shows such as Kismet, Man Of La Mancha, The Fantasticks, Sweeney Todd and Carousel, along with dramatic performances in The Seagull, Macbeth, and Clarence Darrow.

Canary's first daytime television role was on Search for Tomorrow, where he played the short-term role of Liza Walton's agent. He had two short stints on The Doctors as Far Wind, a cult leader who took the hospital staff hostage and killed Melissa Dancy (Dorian Lo Pinto). In 1981, he assumed the role of Steve Frame on the soap opera Another World. The revival of the Steve/Alice/Rachel love triangle was unsuccessful, and he left the show in 1983 after his character was killed off.

On New Year's Eve in 1983, he joined the cast of All My Children in the role of Adam Chandler. The following year, he was also cast as Adam's meek twin brother, Stuart, who everybody (including the audience) believed was Adam. A May 2009 storyline had Adam accidentally shoot and kill Stuart while using prescription narcotics. Canary retired from full-time acting and departed from All My Children in 2010; his last episode was taped in late March and aired on April 23, 2010. He announced that he intended to return to AMC occasionally. He reprised both of his roles as Adam and Stuart Chandler for several days before the series finale on ABC on September 23, 2011. In 2013, he returned to the role of Adam when the show began to produce online episodes.

Canary's primetime television guest appearances include Law & Order, Touched by an Angel, S.W.A.T., Primus, Alias Smith and Jones, Police Story, Kung-Fu, Hawaii Five-O, Remember WENN, and Cimarron Strip. The actor also appeared as the locomotive engineer in the movie Atomic Train. In 2004, he appeared as mathematical genius Robert in a well-reviewed production of David Auburn's Proof in Canton, Ohio, near his hometown of Massillon.

Canary was known to be affable and accessible to fans of both All My Children and Bonanza. At Disney resorts, he did "meet and greet" appearances where he signed autographs for AMC fans. He also made several appearances at the Lake Tahoe site of the Ponderosa Ranch, a tourist attraction from 1967 to 2004. His last appearance at the ranch in character was in 2002 for a PAX-TV special. In March 2012, David was named as the replacement for the ailing, 90-year-old Jack Klugman in a limited-run production of Twelve Angry Men in New Brunswick, New Jersey.

== Personal life ==
Canary was married to actress Maureen Maloney, with whom he had a son, Chris, and a daughter, Kate. With his first wife, actress Julie M. Anderson, he had a daughter, Lisa.

=== Death ===
Canary died on November 16, 2015, at an assisted living facility in Wilton, Connecticut, at the age of 77; he had been diagnosed with dementia years before.

== Filmography ==
Film
| Year | Title | Role | Notes |
|---|---|---|---|
| 1967 | Hombre | Lamar Dean | |
| 1967 | The St. Valentine's Day Massacre | Frank Gusenberg | |
| 1969 | The Computer Wore Tennis Shoes | Mr. Walski | Uncredited |
| 1973 | Incident on a Dark Street | Peter Gallagher | TV movie |
| 1974 | Melvin Purvis: G-Man | Eugene T. Farber | TV movie |
| 1975 | Sharks' Treasure | Larry | |
| 1975 | Posse | Pensteman | |
| 1975 | Johnny Firecloud | Jesse | |
| 1990 | In a Pig's Eye | | |
| 1994 | Secret Santa | Santa | Short |

Television
| Year | Title | Role | Notes |
|---|---|---|---|
| 1965-1966 | Peyton Place | Dr. Russ Gehrig | 26 episodes |
| 1967 | Gunsmoke | George McClaney | Episodes: "Nitro Part 1 & 2" |
| 1967 | Dundee and the Culhane | Charlie Montana | Episode: "The Dead Man's Brief" |
| 1967 | Cimarron Strip | Tal St. James | Episode: "Knife in the Darkness" |
| 1967-1973 | Bonanza | Candy Canaday | 80 episodes |
| 1971 | The F.B.I. | Eugene Bradshaw | Episode: "The Last Job" |
| 1971 | Hawaii Five-O | George | Episode: "3000 Crooked Miles to Honolulu" |
| 1971 | Bearcats! | Joe Bascom | Episode: "The Hostage" |
| 1971; 1972 | Alias Smith and Jones | Sheriff W.D. Coffin; Doc Donovan | Episode: "Everything Else You Can Steal"; Episode: "The Strange Fate of Conrad Meyer Zulick" |
| 1973 | Police Story | Wally Baker | Episode: "Death on Credit" |
| 1973 | Kung Fu | Frank Grogan | Episode: "The Elixir" |
| 1973; 1974 | The Rookies | TJ Curlew; Espositos | Episode: "Down Home Boy"; Episode: "A Test of Courage" |
| 1975 | S.W.A.T. | Blake Phillips | Episode: "Kill S.W.A.T." |
| 1978 | The Dain Curse | Jack Santos | |
| 1978 | Search for Tomorrow | Arthur Benson | |
| 1979-1980 | The Doctors | Warner / "Far Wind" | |
| 1981-1983 | Another World | Steve Frame | |
| 1982 | American Playhouse | Bingham | Episode: "King of America" |
| 1983-2011, 2013; 1984-2009, 2011 | All My Children | Adam Chandler; Stuart Chandler | (final appearance) |
| 1997 | Remember WENN | Luke Langly | Episode: "Strange Bedfellows" |
| 1998 | Law & Order | Jeremy Orenstein | Episode: "Venom" |
| 2000; 2005 | One Life to Live | Adam Chandler | |
| 2001 | Touched by an Angel | Carter Winslow | Episodes: "Shallow Water Part 1 & 2" |
| 2011 | Curb Your Enthusiasm | White Haired Man at Park | Episode: "The Bi-Sexual" |

== Awards and nominations ==
Canary won five Daytime Emmy Awards as Outstanding Lead Actor in a Drama Series, and was nominated an additional 11 times, most recently in 2008 for Best Lead Actor.
