= Hayley Vaughan =

- All My Children character
- Portrayed by: Kelly Ripa
- Duration: 1990–2002; 2010
- First appearance: November 22, 1990
- Last appearance: January 5, 2010
- Created by: Agnes Nixon
- Introduced by: Felicia Minei Behr (1990); Julie Hanan Carruthers (2010)
In-universe information
- Other names: Hayley Chandler
- Occupation: Host of Wave; Co-proprietor of Sounds of Salsa; Co-proprietor of Holidays; CEO of Enchantment Cosmetics; Private investigator
- Family: Chandler
- Parents: Adam Chandler; Arlene Vaughan
- Stepfather: Harry Vaughan (legal)
- Half-brothers: JR Chandler; Miguel Reyes
- Half-sisters: Skye Chandler (legal); Anna Chandler; Colby Chandler
- Husband: Will Cortlandt (1992); Alec McIntyre (1995–97); Mateo Santos (1997–98, 2000–)
- Sons: Enzo Santos
- Stepsons: Max Santos
- Aunts and uncles: Lottie Chandler; Stuart Chandler; Trevor Dillon
- Nieces and nephews: Lila Rae Alcazar (legal); AJ Chandler (half)
- First cousins: Ross Chandler; Scott Chandler (adoptive); Tim Dillon (adoptive); Amanda Dillon; Julie Rand Chandler (once removed; adoptive); Trevor Martin (once removed)

Hayley Vaughan is a fictional character from the American ABC soap opera, All My Children. She was portrayed by actress Kelly Ripa from November 22, 1990, to December 18, 2002. Ripa returned to the role briefly for two episodes in January 2010 for the series' 40th anniversary.

After Ripa introduced the role of Hayley Vaughan to viewers, she quickly became one of the most popular characters on the soap opera. On April 14, 2011, after the impending cancellation of All My Children, Live with Regis and Kelly honored the character of Hayley with a special video montage, as Ripa felt saddened by the loss of the series.

== Storylines ==
Hayley arrived in Pine Valley on Thanksgiving Day 1990 with her hair dyed jet black in an Elvira hairdo with makeup to match (she was Pine Valley's answer to punk rock). She crashed Trevor and Natalie's party and announced that she was staying with them. Her mother Arlene soon followed and it was revealed that Hayley had spent a miserable childhood playing caretaker to her alcoholic mother. When Arlene crashed into Jack's car causing a pregnant Brooke to go into premature labor, Arlene pleaded with Hayley to lie and say she was driving to keep Arlene from going to jail for a drunk driving charge. Hayley complied. Hayley's then-boyfriend, Brian Bodine, knew the truth and convinced Hayley to come clean. Arlene, unable to let her daughter take the blame for her crime, confessed and went to jail for her role in the scheme. Hayley and Brian got engaged, but her ever-controlling father, Adam, saw to it that this relationship came to an abrupt end.

Hayley turned to alcohol and Will Cortlandt for comfort. Having been disinherited by his Uncle Palmer, Will convinced a drunken Hayley to elope with him. When Will tried to force himself upon his virgin wife, Hayley couldn't bring herself to sleep with Will. Hayley slowly turned against nearly everyone who loved her, due to Will's manipulations and staunchly defended him when Gloria Marsh accused him of rape. Will was later found murdered after Hayley, in a drunken epiphany, finally realized the truth about him. Janet Green was later revealed as the murderer. After her relationship with Brian ended, Hayley was free to fall in love with Charlie Brent. They opened Pine Valley Investigations and had a wonderful relationship until Adam, once again stepped in and broke up this relationship. Adam turned over the CEO position of Enchantment to Hayley as a consolation prize in order to control her.

At Enchantment Hayley met Alec McIntyre, another con artist like Will Cortlandt. When her mother was released from jail, she pressured Hayley into marrying Alec. Hayley married him, despite her attraction to Mateo Santos, the younger brother of Dr. Maria Santos. Mateo tried to convince Hayley of Alec's demonic behavior. Hayley was finally convinced when she and Mateo walked into her mother's room and found Alec trying to pour alcohol down Arlene's throat in order to silence her threats of telling Hayley about their sordid affair. Hayley sent Alec McIntyre to jail for trying to kill her mother via alcohol poisoning. Trevor told Arlene that it would be best if she left town for a while in a rehabilitation program, Arlene took his advice. Mateo and Hayley finally declared their love for each other and were engaged. Hayley and Mateo started living together in a small apartment. Mateo came upon a terrific idea of buying "Hal's Bar" and start a restaurant/cafe shop with Hayley. After many attempts to buy the bar, they finally were permitted to buy the bar and they turned it into a restaurant called "Holidays" and business started rolling in.

Mateo and Haley's relationship was tested by one of Mateo's old friends, Tanner Jordan. Tanner arrived in Pine Valley from Texas and immediately accepted a job as a waiter at Holidays. Tanner desired Hayley from the first day he saw her. Determined to win her over, he tried everything in his power to break up Mateo and Hayley – including paying an actor to impersonate his alcoholic father. Tanner was an airplane pilot and used Hayley's interest in learning to fly as a means of getting closer to her. He convinced Hayley to fly with him under the guise of surprising Mateo while he was in Texas, but instead he faked a forced emergency landing near a cave in Virginia where he drugged and raped her. All hopes of finding Hayley seemed lost, but Mateo managed to find the cave. As he struggled with Tanner, Tanner was accidentally mortally wounded by a gunshot. Mateo found Hayley and had her rushed to a nearby hospital. Mateo stayed by her side and asked her to marry him – right there, right now. Hayley said yes and she and Mateo (with Adam and Liza there as witnesses) were married in her hospital room.

Life seemed to return to normal for Hayley and her husband. When Erica visited Enchantment and saw how poorly it was being run by the management team Hayley had installed, she made an offer to buy back the cosmetics company. Hayley was more than willing to sell Enchantment back to Erica.

Life was blissful for Hayley and Mateo until tragedy entered their lives once more in the form of Jim Thompson. Jim, a surviving passenger on the airplane flight that took Maria Santos Grey's life, created a phony relationship with Brooke English in hopes of hiding the fact that he was responsible for the plane's destruction. Brooke, suspicion of Jim's actions, asked Hayley and Mateo to do some sleuthing into Jim's past. Hayley and Mateo discovered some of Jim's shady secrets, putting their lives in jeopardy. Jim learned of Hayley and Mateo's investigation and rigged the furnace of their apartment building to expel carbon monoxide gas into their apartment. Hayley and Mateo survived, but Mateo remained in a coma for weeks.

More tragedy befell Hayley when Lee Hawkins arrived in town looking for his daughter, Camille. Lee sought revenge on Adam Chandler for his daughter's death. In retribution, Lee kidnapped Hayley, hid her in carnival tent, and tattooed her shoulder with a rose using lead-base paint. Mateo came to her rescue, but Hayley was left unable to have children because of a dangerously high level of lead in her blood.

Raquel Dion, Mateo's unknown first wife, showed up in Pine Valley to unite Mateo with his 7-year-old son, Max, who Mateo didn't know existed. Hayley, surprised by the presence of wife number one learned that because Mateo's marriage to Raquel had never been properly annulled, her marriage to Mateo was invalid. Mateo assured Raquel that their teenage fling was over and that he had no feelings for her, but Raquel refused to sign off on the marriage. Hayley's felt badly because Max saw her as the woman that was keeping his mother and father from getting back together. More importantly, Hayley hated that Raquel had given Mateo the one thing she couldn't – a child. Hayley's relationship with Mateo was furthered strained when she championed Ryan Lavery in his quest to prove his innocence of a rape charge. She found herself jailed for aiding and abetting Ryan – an action that puts Mateo's custody of Max in jeopardy. When the real rapist is identified, Ryan is released from prison and becomes Hayley's best friend – to Mateo's annoyance. Although he and Ryan would eventually become friends themselves.

To help repair the faltering relationship between herself and Mateo, Hayley and Mateo open the Sounds of Salsa club. Hayley, an alcoholic, feels her world is crumbling around her as Mateo spends more and more of his time with his now ex-wife and son. A family counselor advised Hayley not to have any children right away because of Max's emotional instability. Hayley found her desire to take a drink becoming unbearable because of the stress of having to put her life on hold. In desperation she moved out of the condo she shared with Mateo in an attempt to get her head together. The space, she hoped, would help her and Mateo get back together.

Hayley went to her favorite beach spot alone on the Fourth of July, hoping it would bring her some peace. In a panic, Ryan Lavery searched the beach for Hayley, thinking she had done harm to herself. Ryan swam out into the ocean and carried Hayley back to shore. In actuality, Hayley wasn't attempting suicide; she was taking a midnight swim. Upon reaching the sandy beach, Ryan and Hayley kissed – a kiss that was seen by Gillian, Ryan's former wife. Mateo learned of the kiss and believed that Hayley has betrayed him. He had angry words with Ryan and told Ryan that he is finished with Hayley and that he is going with to Texas with Raquel (and Max) to visit his former in-laws.

After returning from Texas, Raquel tried to put the moves on Mateo, but Mateo pushed her away. So upset that she was brushed off, Raquel raced to Hayley and told her that she and Mateo had slept together. Hayley initially doubted the claim, but Raquel continually reminded her that Mateo had also lied about being previously married. Hayley ultimately believed the lie and the stress completely overwhelmed her. Alone at Trevor and Janet's house, Hayley came within inches of drinking a bottle of whiskey. While she didn't, she collapsed from exhaustion and malnourishment. Over time, Hayley and Mateo were able to patch up their difference and they got back together.

Hayley changed her career, becoming the host of a television style show called Wave. As Mateo and Hayley planned to get married – for real – a whirlwind named Arlene breezed into town. Arlene crashed Mateo and Hayley's wedding reception with the news that she and Adam had gotten married. Arlene continued to insinuate herself in Hayley's life. When Arlene revealed that she was pregnant, Hayley and Mateo came up with the idea of adopting Arlene's child. That would allow them to have a child of their own and it would spare the baby from having to grow up with Arlene as a mother. Arlene declined the offer, but after she miscarried she called Hayley to Chandler Mansion with the claim that she had reconsidered. Hayley arrived at the mansion just as her mother had taken a tumble down the steps. Everyone believed that Liza had caused Arlene to fall down the steps and that the fall had killed the baby. Hayley was crushed because it was yet another blow to her desire to have a family. Hayley and Arlene had a showdown on Halloween 2000 in which Hayley told her mother to get lost – and to never come back.

Hayley and Arlene's volatile relationship exploded in the fall of 2000 when, after a boatload of people were drugged with the libido enhancing drug Libidozone, Hayley "killed" her mother. Hayley caught Arlene in bed with a drugged Mateo and strangled her. When her body disappeared from the deck – Adam had stumbled across the body and tossed it overboard – Hayley believed that Arlene was dead. Racked with guilt, Hayley developed an alternate personality, that one her mother. She paraded around town as her mother – complete with wig and tacky clothing.

The Chandler clan was haunted by Arlene's presence until Mateo figured out that Hayley had "become" her mother. Later, however, Mateo also learned that Arlene wasn't really dead after all. A newspaper article that showed a picture of one-of-a-kind necklace that Arlene had stolen from Vanessa Cortlandt the night of the yacht party told him that Arlene had survived her watery grave, made it to land and pawned the necklace for some fast cash. He tracked her down to an exotic island in the Caribbean and hauled her back to Pine Valley just in time to prevent Hayley from confessing in court that she had killed Arlene. Arlene was ordered by Adam to sign off on their marriage and leave town – never to return again.

On February 21, 2001, Hayley learned from a psychic visiting Wave that she was pregnant. On August 29, Hayley delivered a healthy baby boy, whom they named Lorenzo, or "Enzo," after some brief complications. Hayley and Mateo's lives became complicated when Proteus, a mysterious drug lord, demanded that he use SOS as a venue for drug selling. Mateo refused, but Proteus threatened Mateo's family and Mateo was forced into agreeing.

However, Mateo decided to play double agent and while working for Proteus also try to smoke him out and turn him in to the police. Simone Torres played the part of Mateo's mistress in order to throw Proteus off of what was really going on – Mateo was trying to crack the drug lord's inner-ring of advisors in order to take him down. Simone, however, developed real feelings for Mateo and at one point planted a legitimate kiss on her partner. Simone felt badly and apologized profusely to both Mateo and Hayley.

Hayley was able to forgive Simone's transgression, saying that she understood that Mateo was quite handsome. Mateo was jailed for a short time because federal agent Chris Stamp thought it was the only way to keep Mateo safe from Proteus. Simone leaked details of the Proteus investigation to what she believed was a publisher. As it turned out, the "publisher" was really someone working for Proteus – whose identity was revealed as Vanessa Cortlandt. Simone's leak resulted in a sniper gunning down Chris Stamp. Mateo was furious with Simone and ordered her to stay clear of him and his family. Vanessa suffered a nervous breakdown of sorts and was kept under guard at the hospital. Now free from the drug trafficking, Mateo and Hayley were able to return to the more important things in life – like raising their son.

Life took an unexpected turn in late 2002 when Hayley was told that there was an interest in syndicating her Wave talk show. Hayley didn't want to take the job offer because it would mean relocating to California. She and Mateo bickered back and forth for a bit before eventually agreeing to leave Pine Valley.

Hayley returned to Pine Valley in January 2010 to film a documentary about the small town, which had just been named "The Best Town In America" by the Atlantic Press. Hayley reconnected with her loved ones and friends. She explained that she'd missed her Uncle Stuart's funeral because she'd been in a remote region of Australia at the time working. She also revealed that her children were growing up fast. Enzo was a teenager and Max had been sent to a boarding school in Utah because he'd started hanging out with the wrong crowd and butting heads with Mateo. Hayley did a bit of head butting of her own: she strongly disapproved of her father's new wife, Annie Chandler.
