= Hellfest (disambiguation) =

Hellfest is a heavy metal festival held annually in Clisson, France, since 2006.

Hellfest or Hell Fest may also refer to:

- Hellfest (American music festival), held in New York and New Jersey from 1997 to 2005
- Hell Fest, a 2018 horror film
