= Daytime Emmy Award for Outstanding Younger Actress in a Drama Series =

Annual film award

- Awarded for: Outstanding Performance by an Actress in a Drama Series, Age 25 or Younger
- Country: United States
- Presented by: NATAS; ATAS
- First award: 1985
- Final award: 2019

Highlights
- Most awards: Jennifer Finnigan, (3); Jennifer Landon, (3)
- Most nominations: Heather Tom, (8)
- Website: theemmys.tv/daytime
- Related: Award was merged into the Outstanding Younger Performer in a Drama Series category

The Daytime Emmy Award for Outstanding Younger Actress in a Drama Series was an award presented annually by the National Academy of Television Arts and Sciences (NATAS) and the Academy of Television Arts & Sciences (ATAS). It was given annually from 1985 to 2019 to honor a young actress below the age of 25, who had delivered an outstanding performance in a role while working within the daytime drama industry.

At the 12th Daytime Emmy Awards held in 1985, Tracey E. Bregman was the first winner of this award, for her role of Lauren Fenmore on The Young and the Restless. The awards ceremony had not been aired on television for the prior two years, having been criticized for voting integrity. The award was originally called Outstanding Ingenue in a Drama Series, the criteria of the new category were deemed confusing, performers of differing ages were nominated, and critics argued some were of supporting or lead actress standards. Adding to the confusion, the first winner, Bregman, and the Outstanding Supporting Actress winner that year, Beth Maitland, played characters near to the same age. The category was renamed Outstanding Juvenile Female in a Drama Series in 1989, and began using its current title in 1991. The criteria were later altered, requiring that the actress be aged 25 or below.

The award was presented to 26 actresses. The Young and the Restless has the most recipients of this award, with a total of eight. Since 2008, Jennifer Landon had been tied with Jennifer Finnigan for most wins, with three each. In 1999, Heather Tom became the most nominated actress in the category, when she was nominated a seventh time, also winning a second time that year. She was nominated again the following year, holding the title with eight nominations; however, she lost to Camryn Grimes. In 2000, Grimes also became the youngest recipient of the award, winning at the age of 10. In 2012, Christel Khalil became the first African-American and woman of color to have garnered the award, winning for her role as Lily Winters on The Young and the Restless.

At the 2019 ceremony, Hayley Erin became the last awarded actress in this category, for her role as Kiki Jerome on General Hospital. In October 2019, the NATAS decided to replace both younger actor and actress categories with a single, gender-neutral one: Outstanding Younger Performer in a Drama Series.

== Winners and nominees ==
Listed below are the winners of the award for each year, as well as the other nominees.

Table Key
‡	Indicates the winner

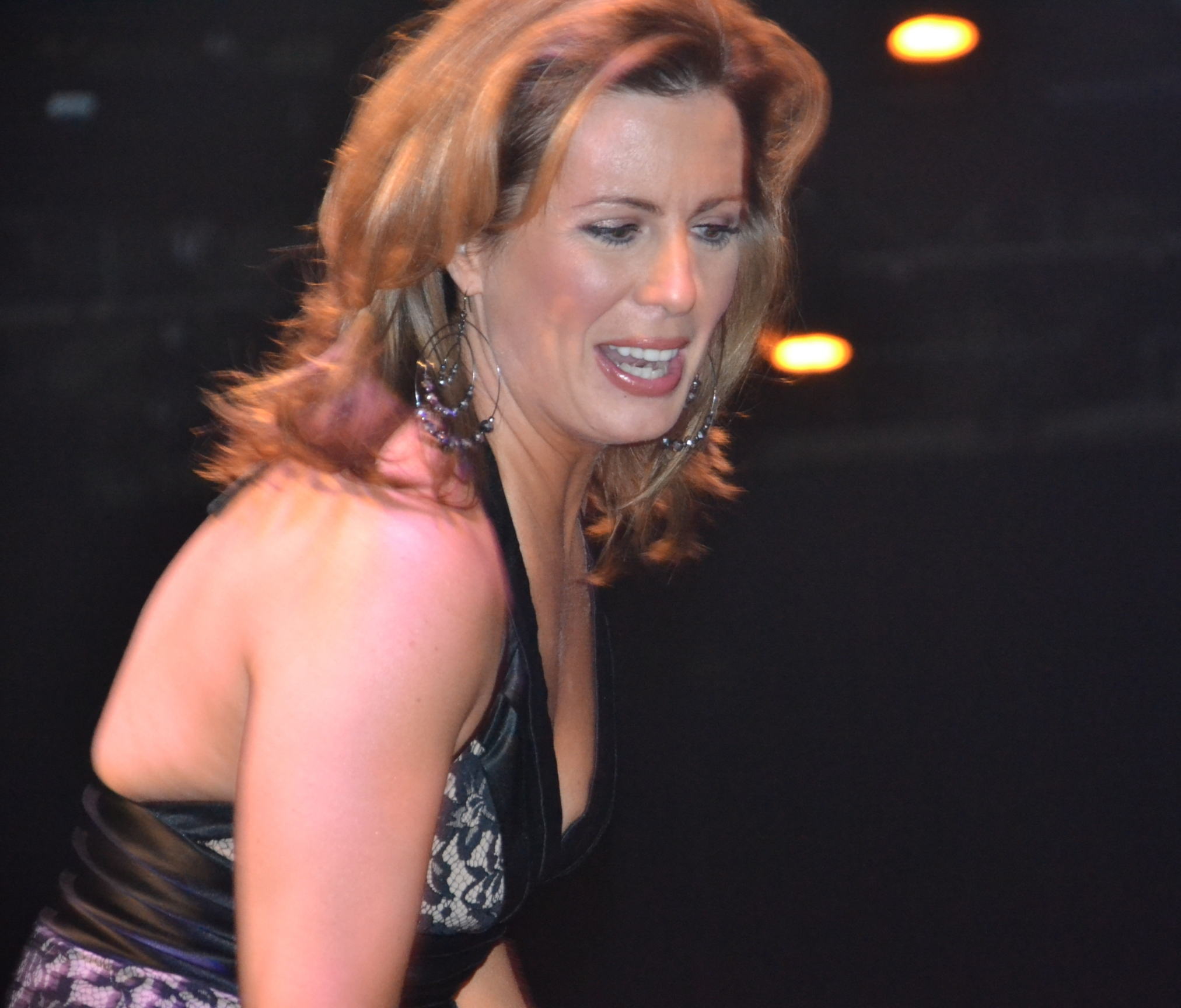
Martha Byrne was nominated five time, and won once, in 1987, for her role as Lily Walsh on As the World Turns.

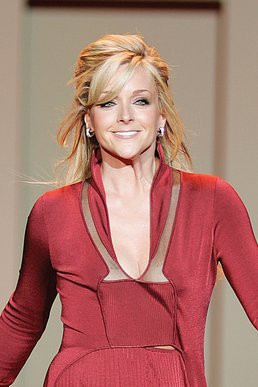
Jane Krakowski was nominated twice for her role as T. R. Kendall on Search for Tomorrow.

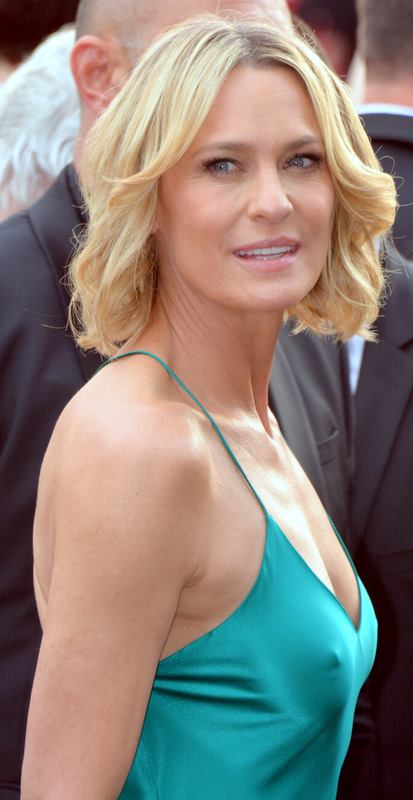
Robin Wright was nominated three times for her role as Kelly Capwell on Santa Barbara.

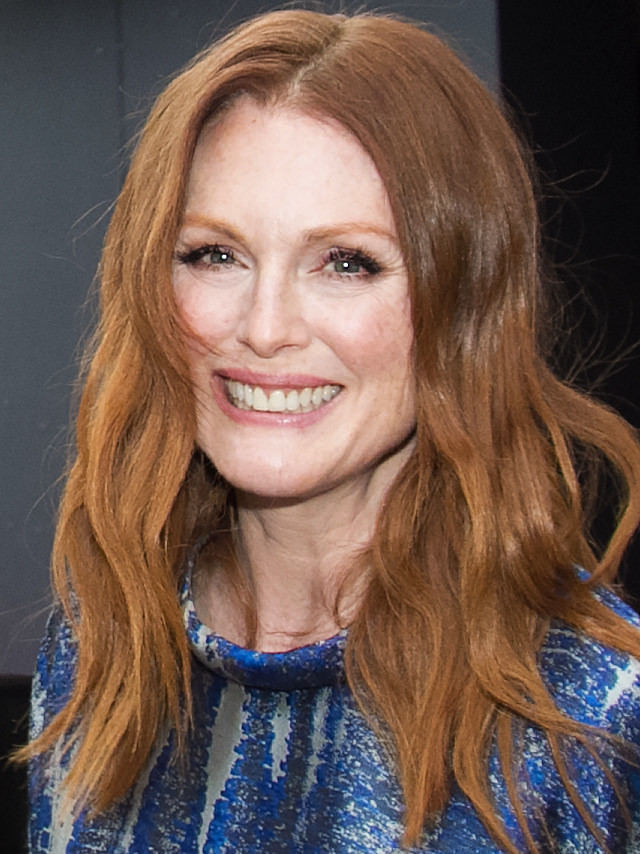
Julianne Moore won in 1988, for her role as Frannie Hughes and Sabrina Hughes on As the World Turns.

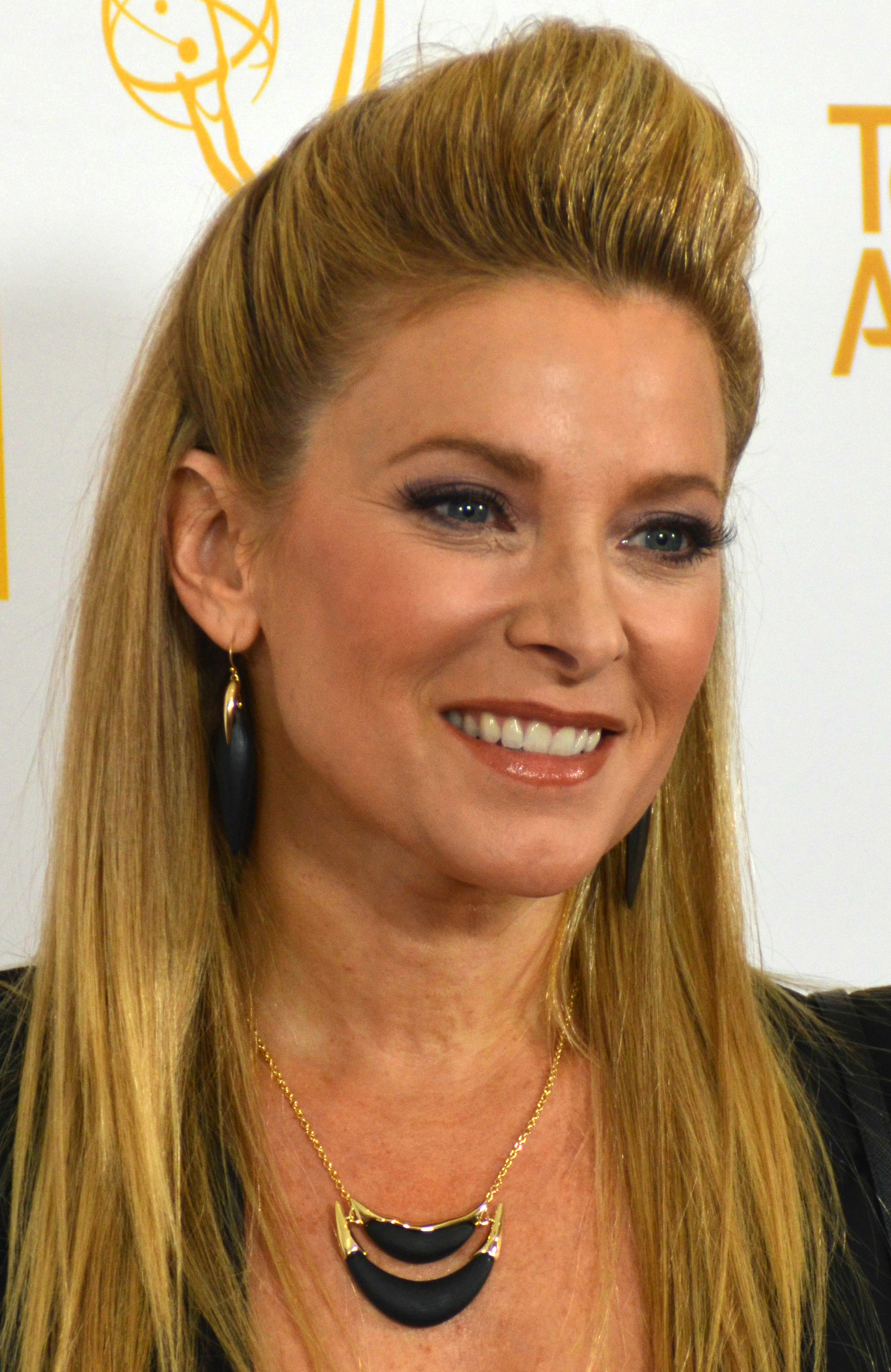
Cady McClain was nominated twice, and won in 1990, for her role as Dixie Cooney on All My Children.

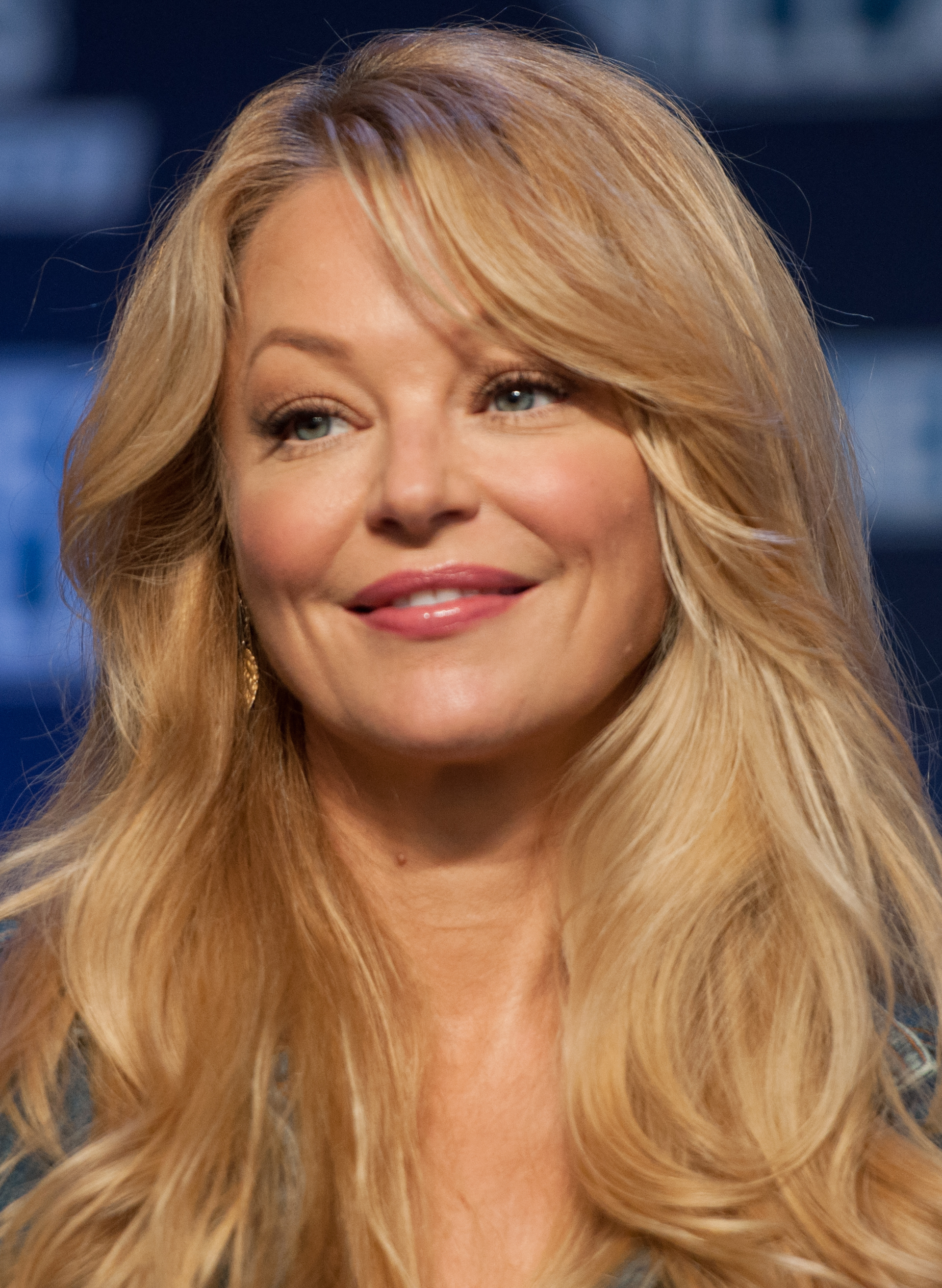
Charlotte Ross received two nominations for her role as Eve Donovan on Days of Our Lives.

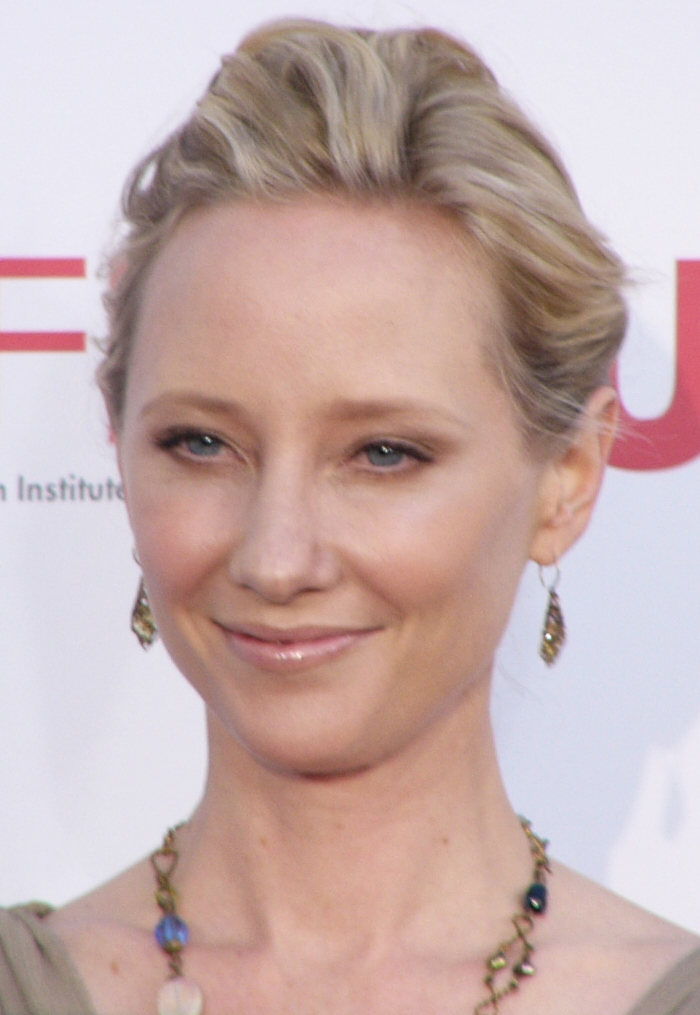
Anne Heche was nominated twice, and won in 1991, for her role as Marley Hudson and Vicky Hudson on Another World.

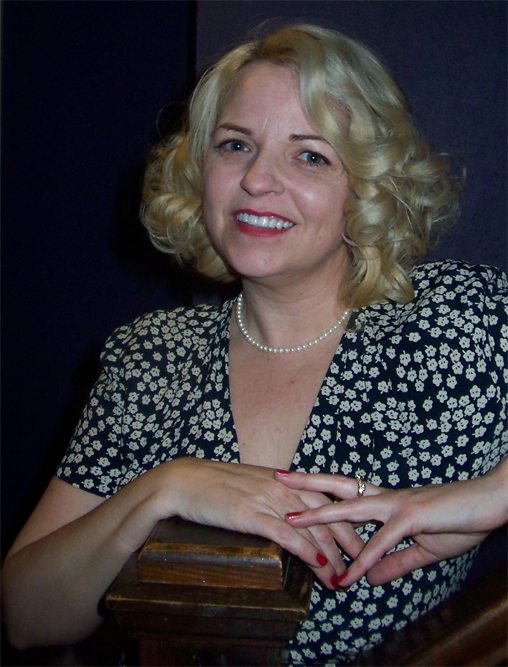
Tricia Cast was nominated twice, and won in 1992, for her role as Nina Webster on The Young and the Restless.

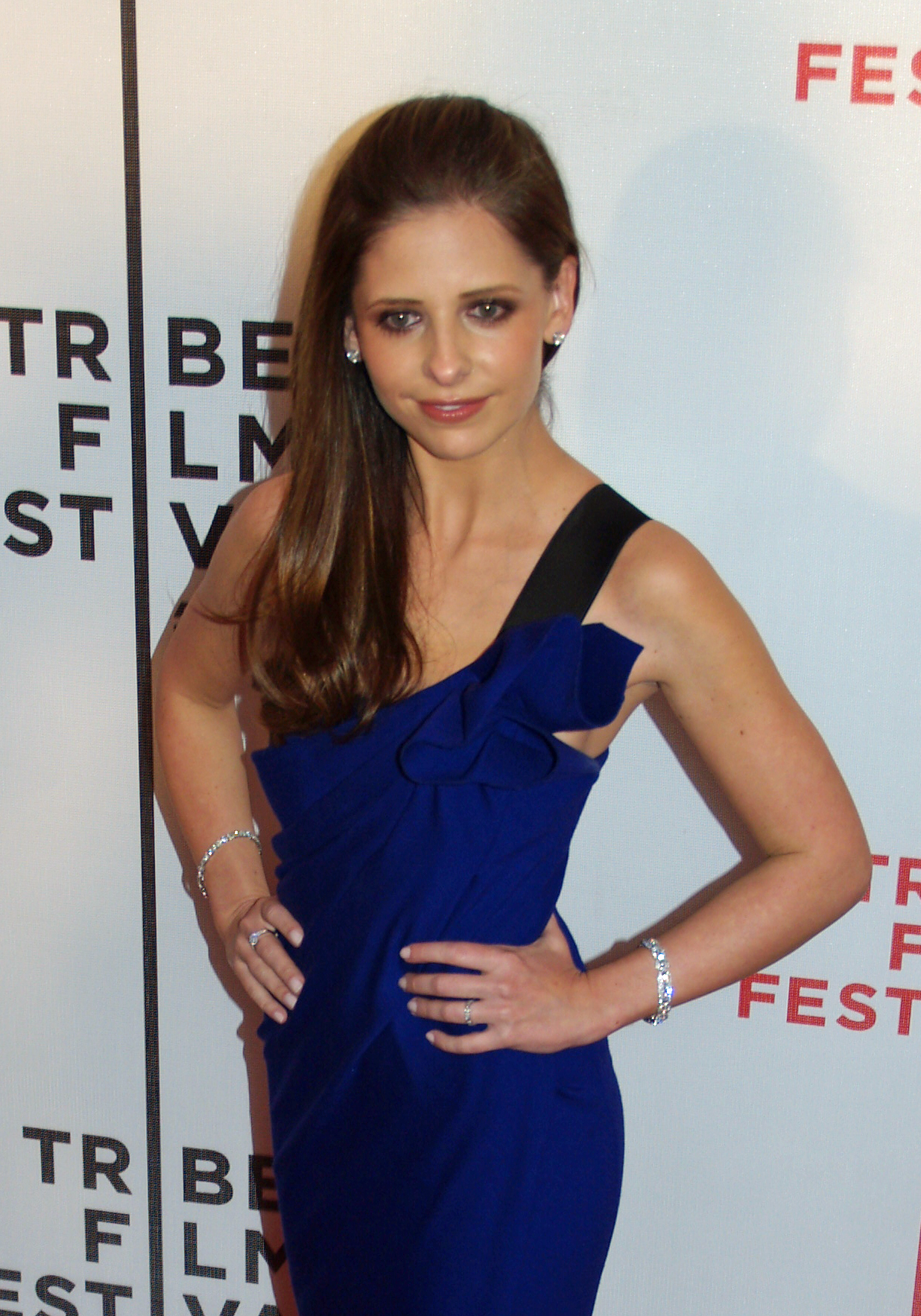
Sarah Michelle Gellar was nominated twice, and won in 1995, for her role as Kendall Hart on All My Children.

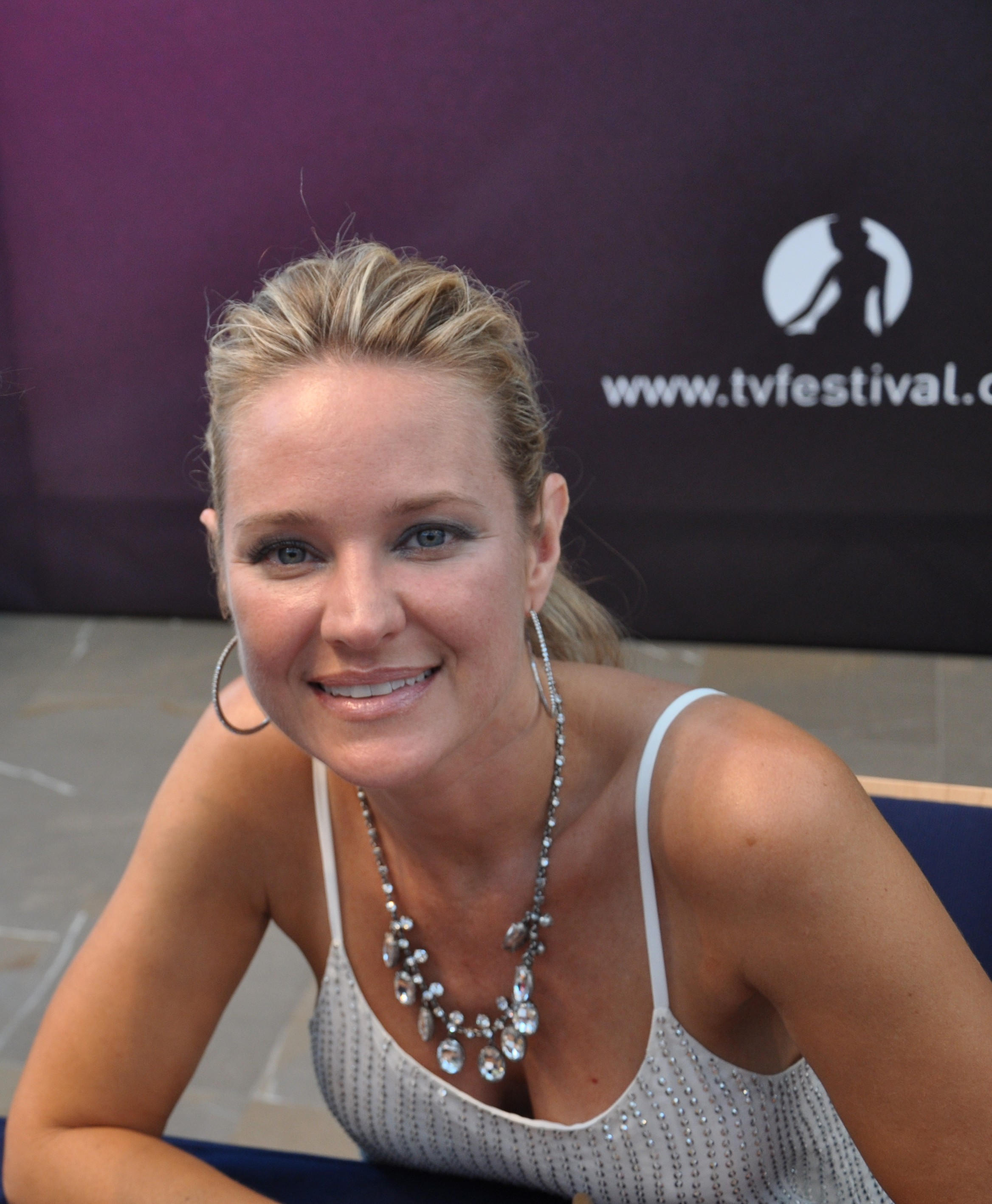
Sharon Case garnered two nominations (1996 and 1997) for her portrayal of Sharon Newman on The Young and the Restless.

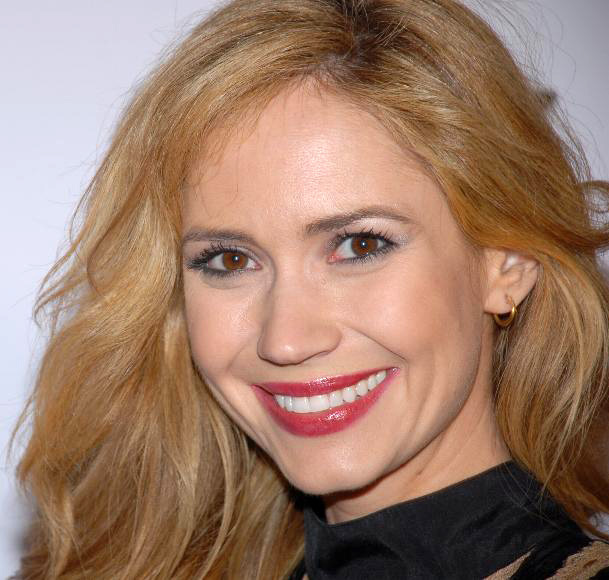
Ashley Jones was nominated twice for her role as Megan Dennison on The Young and the Restless.

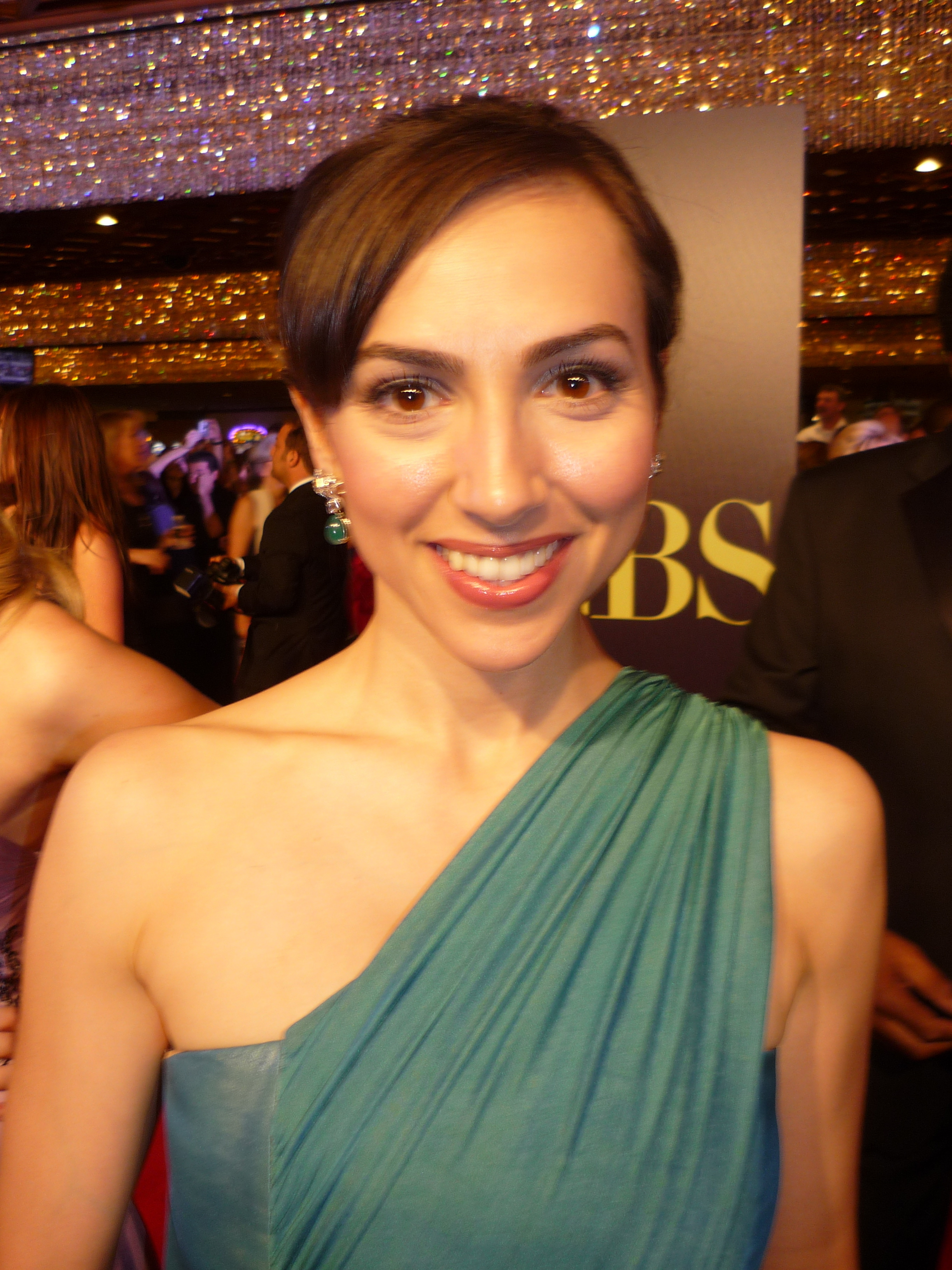
Eden Riegel was nominated four times, and won in 2005, for her role as Bianca Montgomery on All My Children.

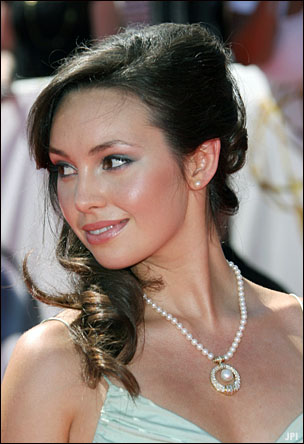
Emily O'Brien received three nominations (2008, 2009, and 2011) for her role as Jana Hawkes Fisher on The Young and the Restless.

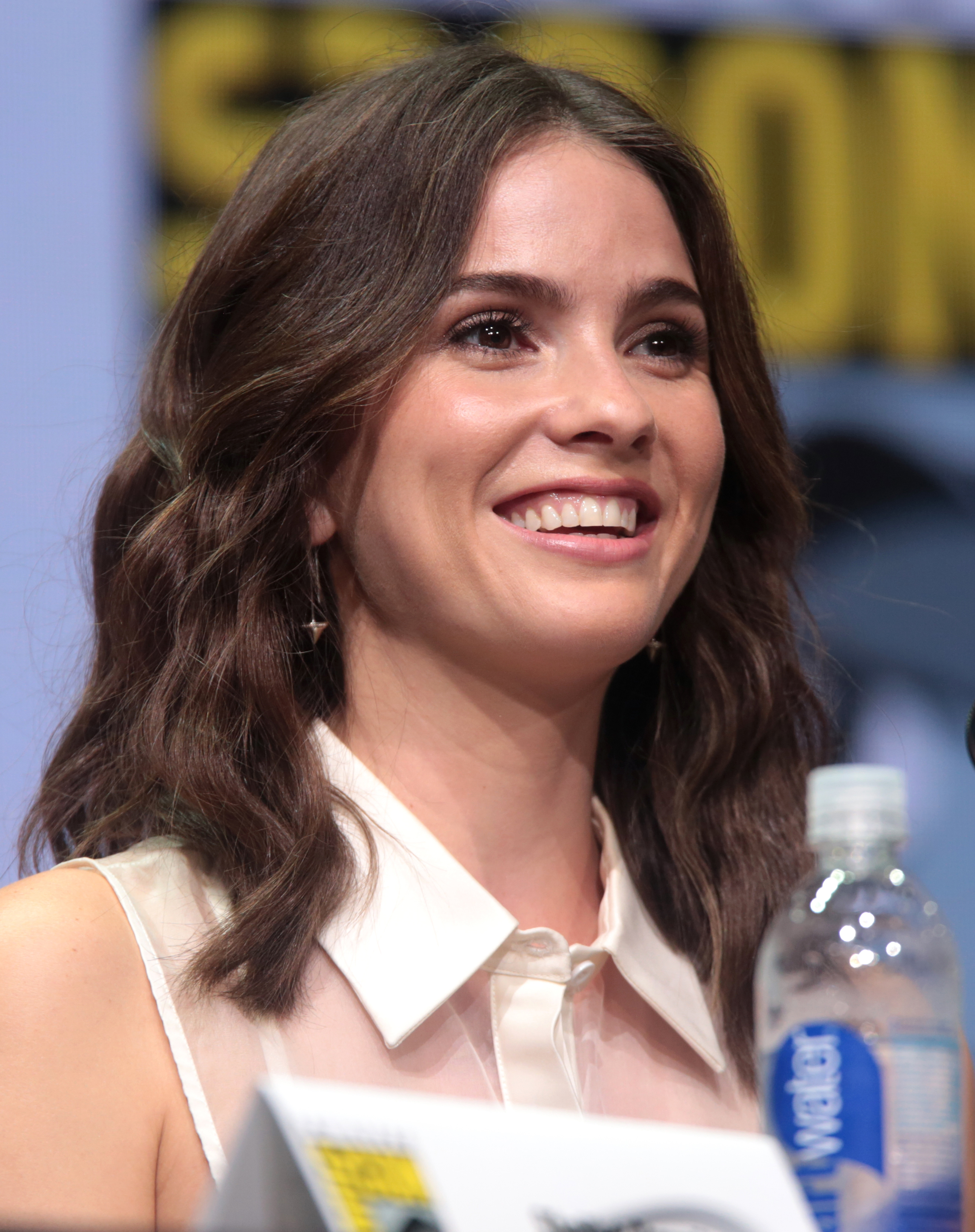
Shelley Hennig received two nominations (2010 and 2012) for her role as Stephanie Johnson on Days of Our Lives.

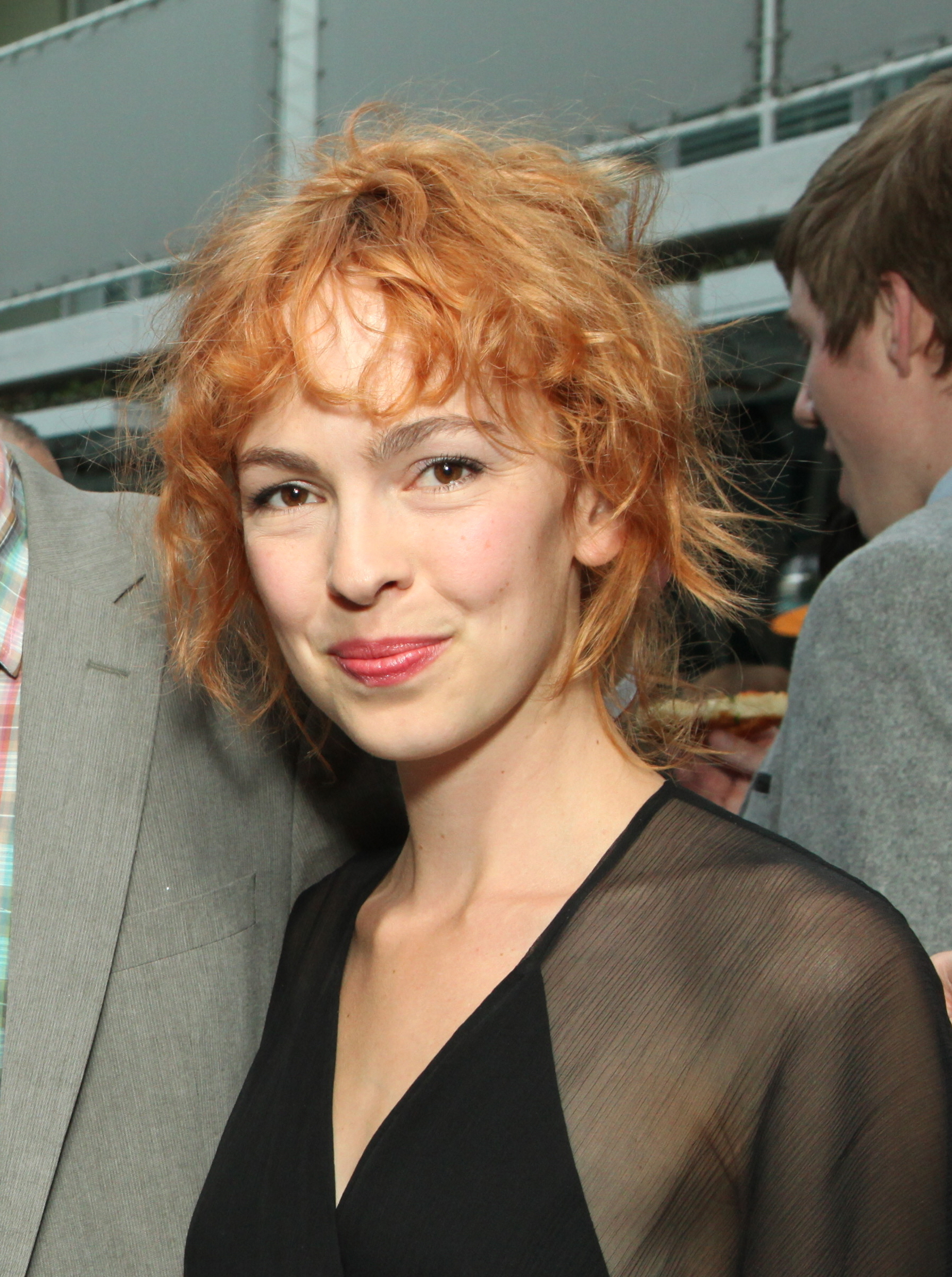
Brittany Allen won in 2011 for her role as Marissa Chandler on All My Children.

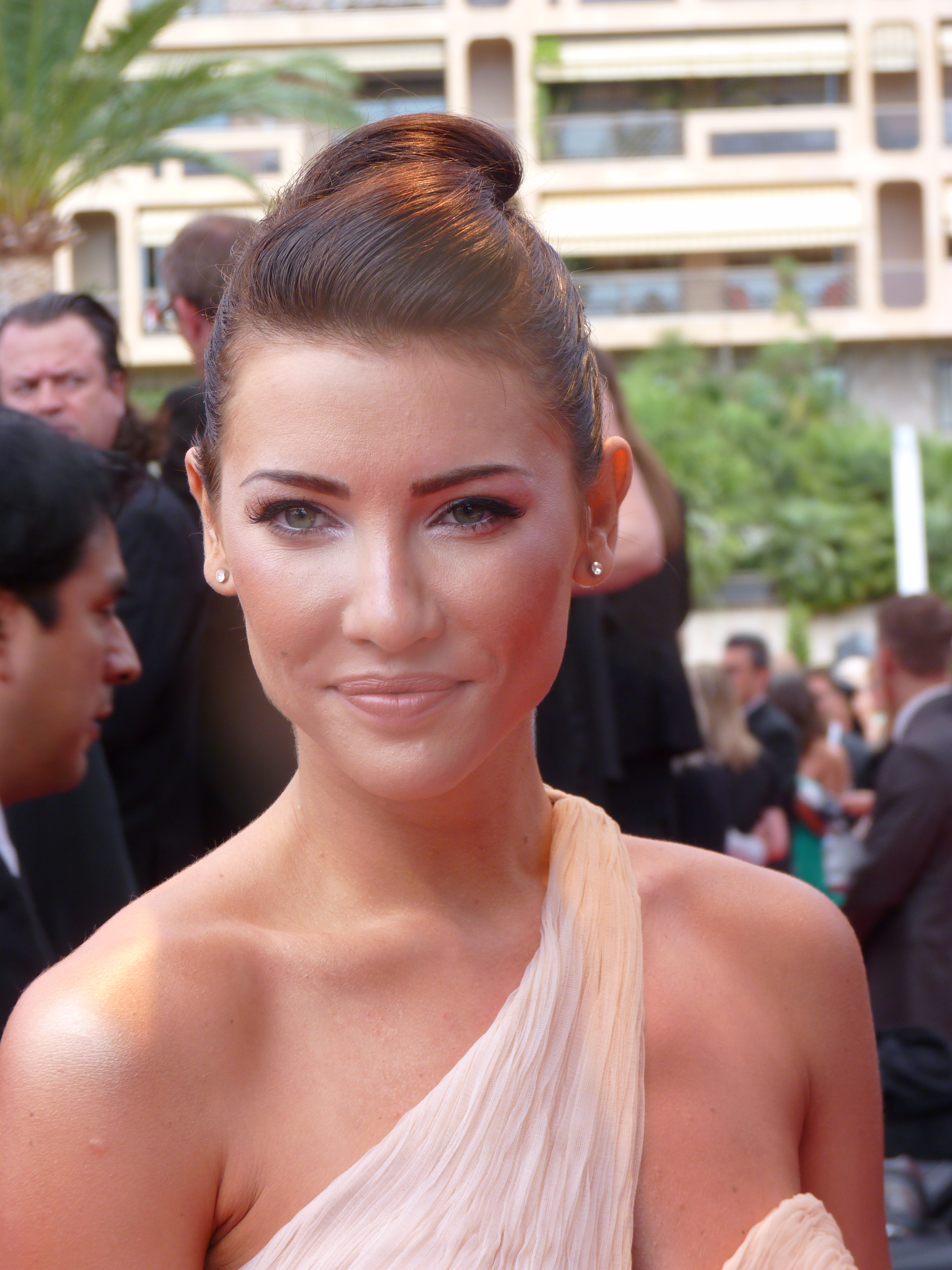
Jacqueline MacInnes Wood received two nominations for her role as Steffy Forrester on The Bold and the Beautiful.

=== 1980s ===
Year	Actress	Program	Role	Network	Ref.
1985 (12th)
1985 (12th)	Tracey E. Bregman ‡	The Young and the Restless	Lauren Fenmore Williams	CBS	
1985 (12th)	Kristian Alfonso	Days of Our Lives	Hope Williams	NBC	
1985 (12th)	Melissa Leo	All My Children	Linda Warner	ABC	
1985 (12th)	Lisa Trusel	Days of Our Lives	Melissa Anderson	NBC	
1985 (12th)	Tasia Valenza	All My Children	Dottie Thornton	ABC	
1986 (13th)
1986 (13th)	Ellen Wheeler ‡	Another World	Marley Love/Vicky Love	NBC	
1986 (13th)	Martha Byrne	As the World Turns	Lily Walsh	CBS	
1986 (13th)	Jane Krakowski	Search for Tomorrow	T. R. Kendall	NBC	
1986 (13th)	Debbi Morgan	All My Children	Angie Baxter Hubbard	ABC	
1986 (13th)	Robin Wright	Santa Barbara	Kelly Capwell	NBC	
1987 (14th)
1987 (14th)	Martha Byrne ‡	As the World Turns	Lily Walsh	CBS	
1987 (14th)	Tracey E. Bregman	The Young and the Restless	Lauren Fenmore	CBS	
1987 (14th)	Jane Krakowski	Search for Tomorrow	T. R. Kendall	NBC	
1987 (14th)	Krista Tesreau	Guiding Light	Mindy Lewis	CBS	
1987 (14th)	Robin Wright	Santa Barbara	Kelly Capwell	NBC	
1988 (15th)
1988 (15th)	Julianne Moore ‡	As the World Turns	Frannie Hughes/Sabrina Hughes	CBS	
1988 (15th)	Tichina Arnold	Ryan's Hope	Zena Brown	ABC	
1988 (15th)	Andrea Evans	One Life to Live	Tina Lord	ABC	
1988 (15th)	Lauren Holly	All My Children	Julie Chandler	ABC	
1988 (15th)	Robin Wright	Santa Barbara	Kelly Capwell	NBC	
1989 (16th)
1989 (16th)	Kimberly McCullough ‡	General Hospital	Robin Scorpio	ABC	
1989 (16th)	Noelle Beck	Loving	Trisha Alden	ABC	
1989 (16th)	Martha Byrne	As the World Turns	Lily Walsh	CBS	
1989 (16th)	Anne Heche	Another World	Marley Hudson/Vicky Hudson	NBC	

=== 1990s ===
Year	Actress	Program	Role	Network	Ref.
1990 (17th)
1990 (17th)	Cady McClain ‡	All My Children	Dixie Cooney	ABC	
1990 (17th)	Kimberly McCullough	General Hospital	Robin Scorpio	ABC	
1990 (17th)	Charlotte Ross	Days of Our Lives	Eve Donovan	NBC	
1990 (17th)	Liz Vassey	All My Children	Emily Ann Sago	ABC	
1991 (18th)
1991 (18th)	Anne Heche ‡	Another World	Marley Hudson/Vicky Hudson	NBC	
1991 (18th)	Tricia Cast	The Young and the Restless	Nina Webster Chancellor	CBS	
1991 (18th)	Kimberly McCullough	General Hospital	Robin Scorpio	ABC	
1991 (18th)	Ashley Peldon	Guiding Light	Marah Lewis	CBS	
1991 (18th)	Charlotte Ross	Days of Our Lives	Eve Donovan	NBC	
1992 (19th)
1992 (19th)	Tricia Cast ‡	The Young and the Restless	Nina Webster Chancellor	CBS	
1992 (19th)	Beth Ehlers	Guiding Light	Harley Cooper	CBS	
1992 (19th)	Alla Korot	Another World	Jenna Norris	NBC	
1992 (19th)	Cady McClain	All My Children	Dixie Cooney	ABC	
1992 (19th)	Melissa Reeves	Days of Our Lives	Jennifer Horton Deveraux	NBC	
1993 (20th)
1993 (20th)	Heather Tom ‡	The Young and the Restless	Victoria Newman	CBS	
1993 (20th)	Beth Ehlers	Guiding Light	Harley Cooper	CBS	
1993 (20th)	Melissa Hayden	Guiding Light	Bridget Reardon	CBS	
1993 (20th)	Sydney Penny	Santa Barbara	B. J. Walker	NBC	
1993 (20th)	Kelly Ripa	All My Children	Hayley Vaughan	ABC	
1994 (21st)
1994 (21st)	Melissa Hayden ‡	Guiding Light	Bridget Reardon	CBS	
1994 (21st)	Martha Byrne	As the World Turns	Lily Walsh Grimaldi	CBS	
1994 (21st)	Sarah Michelle Gellar	All My Children	Kendall Hart	ABC	
1994 (21st)	Melina Kanakaredes	Guiding Light	Eleni Andros Cooper	CBS	
1994 (21st)	Heather Tom	The Young and the Restless	Victoria Newman	CBS	
1995 (22nd)
1995 (22nd)	Sarah Michelle Gellar ‡	All My Children	Kendall Hart	ABC	
1995 (22nd)	Kimberly McCullough	General Hospital	Robin Scorpio	ABC	
1995 (22nd)	Rachel Miner	Guiding Light	Michelle Bauer	CBS	
1995 (22nd)	Heather Tom	The Young and the Restless	Victoria Newman	CBS	
1996 (23rd)
1996 (23rd)	Kimberly McCullough ‡	General Hospital	Robin Scorpio	ABC	
1996 (23rd)	Kimberly J. Brown	Guiding Light	Marah Lewis	CBS	
1996 (23rd)	Martha Byrne	As the World Turns	Lily Walsh Grimaldi	CBS	
1996 (23rd)	Sharon Case	The Young and the Restless	Sharon Collins	CBS	
1996 (23rd)	Heather Tom	The Young and the Restless	Victoria Newman	CBS	
1997 (24th)
1997 (24th)	Sarah Joy Brown ‡	General Hospital	Carly Roberts	ABC	
1997 (24th)	Sharon Case	The Young and the Restless	Sharon Newman	CBS	
1997 (24th)	Christie Clark	Days of Our Lives	Carrie Brady	NBC	
1997 (24th)	Kimberly McCullough	General Hospital	Robin Scorpio	ABC	
1997 (24th)	Heather Tom	The Young and the Restless	Victoria Newman	CBS	
1998 (25th)
1998 (25th)	Sarah Joy Brown ‡	General Hospital	Carly Roberts	ABC	
1998 (25th)	Christie Clark	Days of Our Lives	Carrie Brady	NBC	
1998 (25th)	Camryn Grimes	The Young and the Restless	Cassie Newman	CBS	
1998 (25th)	Rhonda Ross Kendrick	Another World	Toni Burrell	NBC	
1998 (25th)	Heather Tom	The Young and the Restless	Victoria Newman	CBS	
1999 (26th)
1999 (26th)	Heather Tom ‡	The Young and the Restless	Victoria Newman	CBS	
1999 (26th)	Sarah Joy Brown	General Hospital	Carly Benson	ABC	
1999 (26th)	Camryn Grimes	The Young and the Restless	Cassie Newman	CBS	
1999 (26th)	Rebecca Herbst	General Hospital	Elizabeth Webber	ABC	
1999 (26th)	Ashley Jones	The Young and the Restless	Megan Dennison	CBS	
1999 (26th)	Sherri Saum	Sunset Beach	Vanessa Hart	NBC	

=== 2000s ===
Year	Actress	Program	Role	Network	Ref.
2000 (27th)
2000 (27th)	Camryn Grimes ‡	The Young and the Restless	Cassie Newman	CBS	
2000 (27th)	Adrienne Frantz	The Bold and the Beautiful	Amber Forrester	CBS	
2000 (27th)	Ashley Jones	The Young and the Restless	Megan Dennison	CBS	
2000 (27th)	Heather Tom	The Young and the Restless	Victoria Newman	CBS	
2000 (27th)	Erin Torpey	One Life to Live	Jessica Buchanan	ABC	
2001 (28th)
2001 (28th)	Adrienne Frantz ‡	The Bold and the Beautiful	Amber Moore	CBS	
2001 (28th)	Terri Colombino	As the World Turns	Katie Peretti	CBS	
2001 (28th)	Annie Parisse	As the World Turns	Julia Lindsey	CBS	
2001 (28th)	Eden Riegel	All My Children	Bianca Montgomery	ABC	
2001 (28th)	Kristina Sisco	As the World Turns	Abigail Williams	CBS	
2002 (29th)
2002 (29th)	Jennifer Finnigan ‡	The Bold and the Beautiful	Bridget Forrester	CBS	
2002 (29th)	Jessica Jimenez	Guiding Light	Catalina Quesada	CBS	
2002 (29th)	Lindsey McKeon	Guiding Light	Marah Lewis	CBS	
2002 (29th)	Eden Riegel	All My Children	Bianca Montgomery	ABC	
2002 (29th)	Kristina Sisco	As the World Turns	Abigail Williams	CBS	
2003 (30th)
2003 (30th)	Jennifer Finnigan ‡	The Bold and the Beautiful	Bridget Forrester	CBS	
2003 (30th)	Adrienne Frantz	The Bold and the Beautiful	Amber Moore	CBS	
2003 (30th)	Lindsey McKeon	Guiding Light	Marah Lewis	CBS	
2003 (30th)	Erin Hershey Presley	Port Charles	Alison Barrington	ABC	
2003 (30th)	Alicia Leigh Willis	General Hospital	Courtney Matthews	CBS	
2004 (31st)
2004 (31st)	Jennifer Finnigan ‡	The Bold and the Beautiful	Bridget Forrester	CBS	
2004 (31st)	Christel Khalil	The Young and the Restless	Lily Winters	CBS	
2004 (31st)	Eden Riegel	All My Children	Bianca Montgomery	ABC	
2004 (31st)	Alicia Leigh Willis	General Hospital	Courtney Matthews	CBS	
2004 (31st)	Lauren Woodland	The Young and the Restless	Brittany Hodges	CBS	
2005 (32nd)
2005 (32nd)	Eden Riegel ‡	All My Children	Bianca Montgomery	ABC	
2005 (32nd)	Jennifer Ferrin	As the World Turns	Jennifer Munson	CBS	
2005 (32nd)	Alexa Havins	All My Children	Babe Carey	ABC	
2005 (32nd)	Crystal Hunt	Guiding Light	Lizzie Spaulding	CBS	
2005 (32nd)	Adrianne León	General Hospital	Brook Lynn Ashton	ABC	
2006 (33rd)
2006 (33rd)	Jennifer Landon ‡	As the World Turns	Gwen Norbeck	CBS	
2006 (33rd)	Mandy Bruno	Guiding Light	Marina Cooper	CBS	
2006 (33rd)	Camryn Grimes	The Young and the Restless	Cassie Newman	CBS	
2006 (33rd)	Christel Khalil	The Young and the Restless	Lily Winters	CBS	
2006 (33rd)	Leven Rambin	All My Children	Lily Montgomery	ABC	
2007 (34th)
2007 (34th)	Jennifer Landon ‡	As the World Turns	Gwen Norbeck	CBS	
2007 (34th)	Julie Berman	General Hospital	Lulu Spencer	ABC	
2007 (34th)	Alexandra Chando	As the World Turns	Maddie Coleman	CBS	
2007 (34th)	Stephanie Gatschet	Guiding Light	Tammy Layne Winslow	CBS	
2007 (34th)	Leven Rambin	All My Children	Lily Montgomery	ABC	
2008 (35th)
2008 (35th)	Jennifer Landon ‡	As the World Turns	Gwen Norbeck	CBS	
2008 (35th)	Vail Bloom	The Young and the Restless	Heather Stevens	CBS	
2008 (35th)	Rachel Melvin	Days of Our Lives	Chelsea Brady	NBC	
2008 (35th)	Emily O'Brien	The Young and the Restless	Jana Hawkes	CBS	
2008 (35th)	Tammin Sursok	The Young and the Restless	Colleen Carlton	CBS	
2009 (36th)
2009 (36th)	Julie Berman ‡	General Hospital	Lulu Spencer	ABC	
2009 (36th)	Meredith Hagner	As the World Turns	Liberty Ciccone	CBS	
2009 (36th)	Rachel Melvin	Days of Our Lives	Chelsea Brady	NBC	
2009 (36th)	Emily O'Brien	The Young and the Restless	Jana Hawkes Fisher	CBS	
2009 (36th)	Kirsten Storms	General Hospital	Maxie Jones	ABC	

=== 2010s ===
Year	Actress	Program	Role	Network	Ref.
2010 (37th)
2010 (37th)	Julie Berman	General Hospital	Lulu Spencer	ABC	
2010 (37th)	Molly Burnett	Days of Our Lives	Melanie Layton	NBC	
2010 (37th)	Shelley Hennig	Days of Our Lives	Stephanie Johnson	NBC	
2010 (37th)	Christel Khalil	The Young and the Restless	Lily Winters	CBS	
2010 (37th)	Marnie Schulenburg	As the World Turns	Alison Stewart	CBS	
2011 (38th)
2011 (38th)	Brittany Allen	All My Children	Marissa Chandler	ABC	
2011 (38th)	Lexi Ainsworth	General Hospital	Kristina Corinthos Davis	ABC	
2011 (38th)	Emily O'Brien	The Young and the Restless	Jana Hawkes	CBS	
2012 (39th)
2012 (39th)	Christel Khalil	The Young and the Restless	Lily Winters	CBS	
2012 (39th)	Molly Burnett	Days of Our Lives	Melanie Layton	NBC	
2012 (39th)	Shelley Hennig	Days of Our Lives	Stephanie Johnson	NBC	
2012 (39th)	Jacqueline MacInnes Wood	The Bold and the Beautiful	Steffy Forrester	CBS	
2013 (40th)
2013 (40th)	Kristen Alderson	General Hospital	Starr Manning	ABC	
2013 (40th)	Hunter King	The Young and the Restless	Summer Newman	CBS	
2013 (40th)	Lindsey Morgan	General Hospital	Kristina Corinthos Davis	ABC	
2013 (40th)	Jacqueline MacInnes Wood	The Bold and the Beautiful	Steffy Forrester	CBS	
2014 (41st)
2014 (41st)	Hunter King	The Young and the Restless	Summer Newman	CBS	
2014 (41st)	Kristen Alderson	General Hospital	Starr Manning	ABC	
2014 (41st)	Linsey Godfrey	The Bold and the Beautiful	Caroline Spencer	CBS	
2014 (41st)	Kim Matula	The Bold and the Beautiful	Hope Logan	CBS	
2014 (41st)	Kelley Missal	One Life to Live	Danielle Manning	TOLN.com	
2015 (42nd)
2015 (42nd)	Hunter King	The Young and the Restless	Summer Newman	CBS	
2015 (42nd)	Kristen Alderson	General Hospital	Kiki Jerome	ABC	
2015 (42nd)	Camila Banus	Days of Our Lives	Gabi Hernandez	NBC	
2015 (42nd)	Haley Pullos	General Hospital	Molly Lansing Davis	ABC	
2016 (43rd)
2016 (43rd)	True O'Brien	Days of Our Lives	Paige Larson	NBC	
2016 (43rd)	Reign Edwards	The Bold and the Beautiful	Nicole Avant	CBS	
2016 (43rd)	Hunter King	The Young and the Restless	Summer Newman	CBS	
2016 (43rd)	Ashlyn Pearce	The Bold and the Beautiful	Aly Forrester	CBS	
2016 (43rd)	Brooklyn Rae Silzer	General Hospital	Emma Drake	ABC	
2017 (44th)
2017 (44th)	Lexi Ainsworth	General Hospital	Kristina Corinthos Davis	ABC	
2017 (44th)	Reign Edwards	The Bold and the Beautiful	Nicole Avant	CBS	
2017 (44th)	Hunter King	The Young and the Restless	Summer Newman	CBS	
2017 (44th)	Chloe Lanier	General Hospital	Nelle Benson	ABC	
2017 (44th)	Alyvia Alyn Lind	The Young and the Restless	Faith Newman	CBS	
2018 (45th)
2018 (45th)	Chloe Lanier	General Hospital	Nelle Benson	ABC	
2018 (45th)	Reign Edwards	The Bold and the Beautiful	Nicole Avant	CBS	
2018 (45th)	Hayley Erin	General Hospital	Kiki Jerome	ABC	
2018 (45th)	Cait Fairbanks	The Young and the Restless	Tessa Porter	CBS	
2018 (45th)	Olivia Rose Keegan	Days of Our Lives	Claire Brady	NBC	
2019 (46th)
2019 (46th)	Hayley Erin	General Hospital	Kiki Jerome	ABC	
2019 (46th)	Olivia Rose Keegan	Days of Our Lives	Claire Brady	NBC	
2019 (46th)	Victoria Konefal	Days of Our Lives	Ciara Brady	NBC	
2019 (46th)	Chloe Lanier	General Hospital	Nelle Benson	ABC	
2019 (46th)	Eden McCoy	General Hospital	Josslyn Jacks	ABC	

== Performers with multiple wins ==
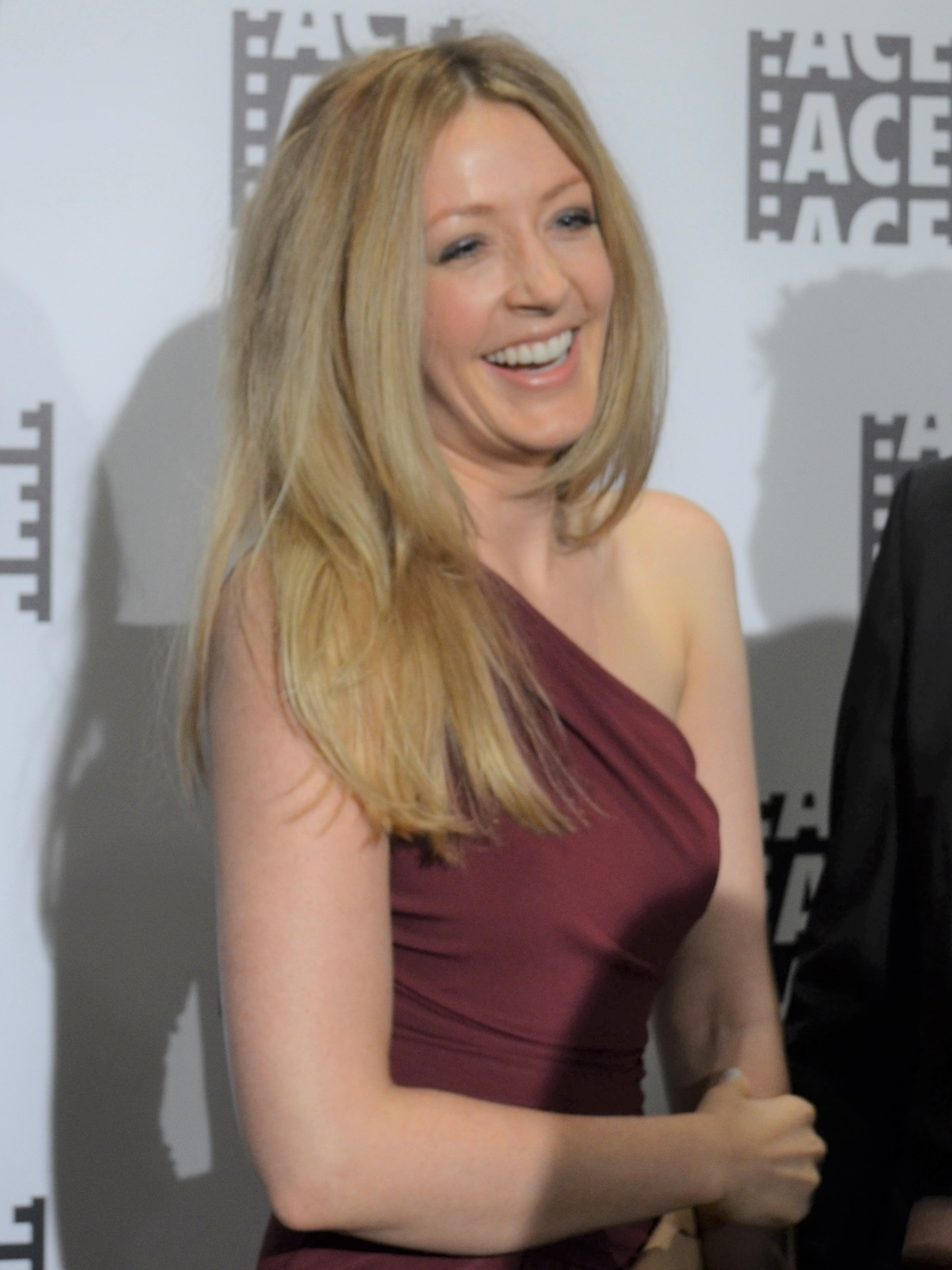
Jennifer Finnigan is one of the actresses who has received the most wins in this category, winning three times for her role as Bridget Forrester on The Bold and the Beautiful.

The following individuals received two or more wins in this category:

3 wins

- Jennifer Finnigan
- Jennifer Landon

2 wins

- Julie Marie Berman
- Sarah Joy Brown
- Hunter King
- Kimberly McCullough
- Heather Tom

== Performers with multiple nominations ==
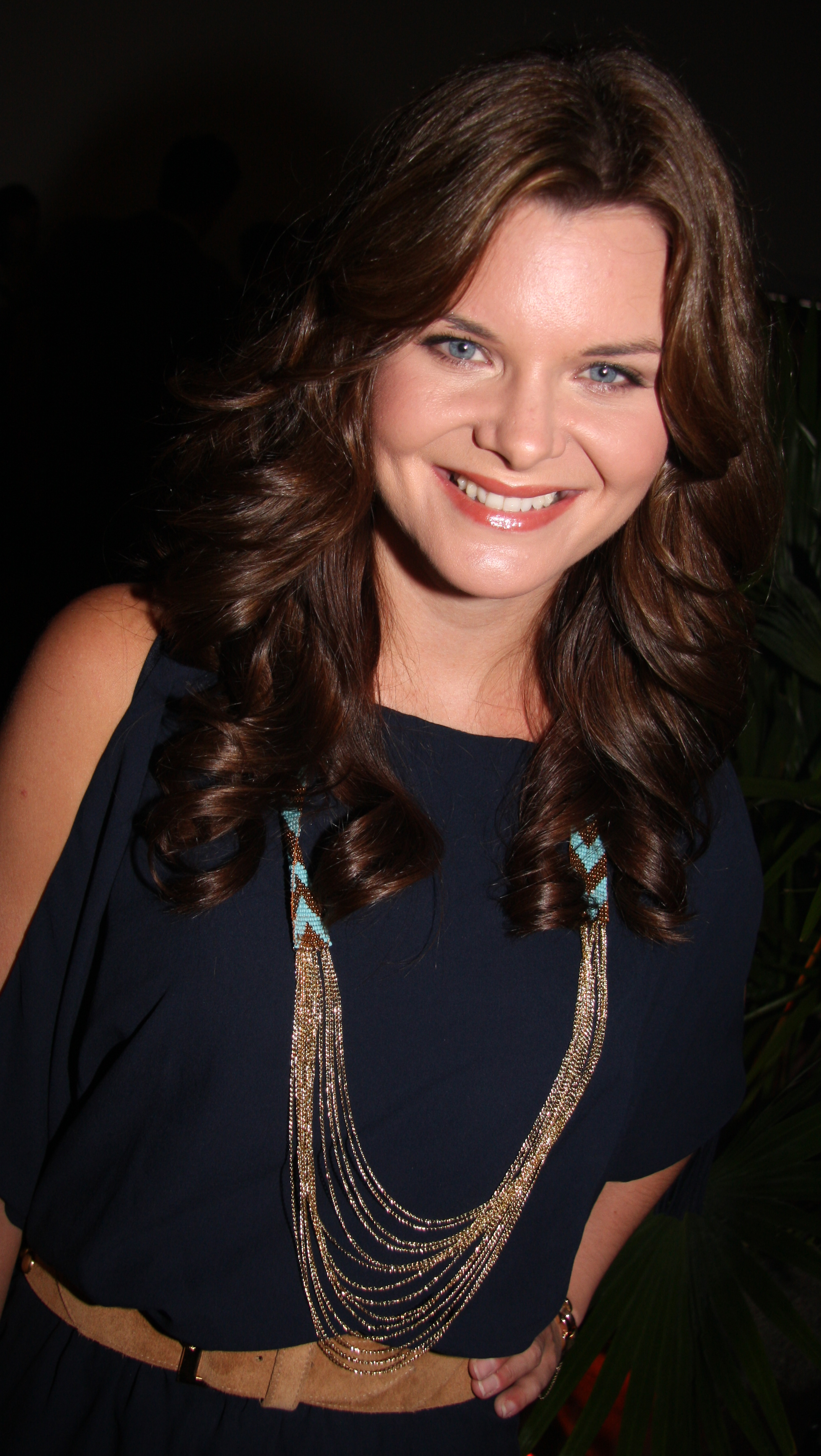
Heather Tom has received the most nominations in this category, with a total of eight, for her role as Victoria Newman on The Young and the Restless.

The following individuals received two or more nominations in this category:

8 nominations

- Heather Tom

6 nominations

- Kimberly McCullough

5 nominations

- Martha Byrne
- Hunter King

4 nominations

- Camryn Grimes
- Christel Khalil
- Eden Riegel

3 nominations

- Kristen Alderson
- Julie Marie Berman
- Sarah Joy Brown
- Reign Edwards
- Jennifer Finnigan
- Adrienne Frantz
- Jennifer Landon
- Chloe Lanier
- Emily O'Brien
- Robin Wright

2 nominations

- Lexi Ainsworth
- Tracey E. Bregman
- Molly Burnett
- Sharon Case
- Tricia Cast
- Christie Clark
- Reign Edwards
- Beth Ehlers
- Hayley Erin
- Sarah Michelle Gellar
- Melissa Hayden
- Anne Heche
- Shelley Hennig
- Ashley Jones
- Olivia Rose Keegan
- Jane Krakowski
- Rachel Melvin
- Cady McClain
- Jacqueline MacInnes Wood
- Lindsey McKeon
- Leven Rambin
- Charlotte Ross
- Kristina Sisco
- Alicia Leigh Willis

== Series with most awards ==
10 wins

- General Hospital

8 wins

- The Young and the Restless

5 wins

- As the World Turns

4 wins

- All My Children
- The Bold and the Beautiful

2 wins

- Another World
