= Reign Edwards =

American actress

- Born: December 1, 1996 (age 29); Harford County, Maryland, U.S.
- Occupation: Actress
- Years active: 2008–present

Reign Edwards (born December 1, 1996) is an American actress. She is best known for her roles as Rachel Reid in The Wilds and as Nicole Avant on the CBS soap opera The Bold and the Beautiful, for which she was nominated for the Daytime Emmy Award for Outstanding Younger Actress in a Drama Series in 2016, 2017 and 2018.

== Biography ==
Edwards was born in Harford County, Maryland. She made her acting debut in the 2008 romantic drama Explicit Ills, written and directed by Mark Weber. In 2011, Edwards playing the younger version of the protagonist portrayed by Nicole Ari Parker, in the romantic comedy film 35 and Ticking written and directed by Russ Parr.

In 2015, she was cast in the CBS drama series The Bold and the Beautiful in the role of Nicole Avant. In 2017, she took the recurring role of a secret agent in the series MacGyver. On the same year, Edwards is currently playing the role of Melody Wright, in the FX crime drama series Snowfall. In 2018, she appeared in the horror film Hell Fest.

Edwards was cast in the drama streaming series The Wilds as Rachel Reid, created by Sarah Streicher for Amazon Prime Video.

== Filmography ==
=== Film ===
Year	Title	Role	Notes
2008	Explicit Ills	Rally Participant	Uncredited
2010	Thicker Than Water	Leah	Short film
2011	35 and Ticking	Young Zenobia	
2018	Hell Fest	Brooke	
2021	Love You Anyway	Mackenzie	Main role
2023	Old Dads	Britney	

=== Television ===
Year	Title	Role	Notes
2015	The Thundermans	Winnie Lee	Recurring role; 3 episodes
2015	K.C. Undercover	Kitten	Episode: "Debutante Baller"
2015–2018	The Bold and the Beautiful	Nicole Avant	Regular role
2017–2021	Snowfall	Melody	Recurring role; 20 episodes
2016–2020	MacGyver	Leanna Martin	Recurring role; 13 episodes
2019	Into the Dark	Cody Baker	Episode: "Pilgrim"
2020–2022	The Wilds	Rachel Reid	Main role
2023	Truth Be Told	Rochelle	5 episodes
2025	High Potential	Harper	Episode: "Pawns"
2026	The Rookie	Myka Love	Episode: "Grand Theft Aircraft"

== Awards ==
List of acting awards
Year	Award	Category	Title	Result	Ref.
2016	Daytime Emmy Award	Outstanding Younger Actress in a Drama Series	The Bold and the Beautiful	Nominated	
2017	Daytime Emmy Award	Outstanding Younger Actress in a Drama Series	The Bold and the Beautiful	Nominated	
2017	Soap Awards France	Best New Character	The Bold and the Beautiful	Nominated	
2018	Daytime Emmy Award	Outstanding Younger Actress in a Drama Series	The Bold and the Beautiful	Nominated	
