= Anna DiMera =

- Days of Our Lives character
- Portrayed by: Leann Hunley
- Duration: 1982–1986; 2007–2010; 2017–2023; 2025–present
- First appearance: July 30, 1982
- Created by: Margaret DePriest; Sheri Anderson
- Introduced by: Betty Corday and Al Rabin (1982); Ken Corday and Edward J. Scott (2007)
- Spin-off appearances: Days of Our Lives: Beyond Salem (2021)
In-universe information
- Other names: Anna Fredericks; Anna Brady; Contessa DiMera
- Occupation: Executive for DiMera Advertising; Executive for Lumberg Advertising; Owner of Anna DiMera Designs; Personal Secretary to Tony DiMera
- Family: DiMera; Brady
- Brothers: Brett Fredericks
- Spouse: Roman Brady (197?–1982); Tony DiMera (1983–1984, 1985, 2008–2009, 2020–present)
- Daughters: Carrie Brady
- Grandsons: Noah Reed

Anna DiMera is a fictional character on the NBC daytime drama, Days of Our Lives. She was introduced as the estranged wife of Roman Brady and the biological mother of his daughter, Carrie Brady. Created by head writers, Margaret DePriest and Sheri Anderson, Anna is portrayed by Leann Hunley. Anna is known for being a member of the powerful, upper class DiMera family from her marriages to Tony DiMera.

Hunley initially portrayed Anna from 1982 to 1986. After a twenty-one year absence, Hunley reprised the role of Anna beginning on June 20, 2007, and remained on contract with the show until April 2, 2009. She then reprised the role again in early-December 2009 on a recurring basis, after taking a leave of absence from the show and ultimately leaving once more on June 15, 2010. In July 2016, it was reported that Hunley was to again reprise the role of Anna, with Anna returning from January 9 to February 16, 2017. In December 2017, it was announced that Hunley would return to the role, beginning January 5, 2018. She appeared until her departure again on February 14, 2018. In May 2019, it was announced that Hunley would reprise the role, beginning in July. On October 3, 2024, it was announced Hunley would reprise the role, when Anna returned on June 6, 2025.

For her portrayal of Anna, Hunley received a Daytime Emmy Award for Outstanding Supporting Actress in 1986.

== Storylines ==
Anna Fredericks first arrives in Salem in 1982, searching for Roman Brady, her husband and the father of her daughter, Carrie. For many years, Roman had been under the impression that Anna had been dead, when in reality she had been sold into slavery. Anna has several red marks on her back, which she claims are from being whipped but are in fact from multiple sclerosis.

Following her divorce from Roman, Anna takes a job as Tony DiMera's secretary, while working in secret for Stefano DiMera, who pays Anna $1,000,000 to have Roman fired from the ISA. To achieve this, Anna has Carrie hypnotized to place fake deposit slips in Roman's home. Although Roman is fired from the police force, the ISA are convinced that Roman had been framed.

In 1983, Anna drugs Tony and marries him in Las Vegas, which angers him. Shortly after the wedding, Tony discovers that one of the stipulations of Stefano's will require him to live with Renée DuMonde and David Banning for a year in order to gain his inheritance.

At one point in time, she discovers she is pregnant with Tony DiMera`s child, but suffers a miscarriage later on.

In 1986, Anna leaves Salem after learning Tony has divorced her. She moves to Europe, where she leads a successful career.

In 2007, Anna returns to Salem to deliver to the Bradys old DiMera family letters belonging to Tony. She becomes involved in the Brady/DiMera feud, and her romance with Roman is reignited. It is revealed that Tony is alive, stranded on an island for over 20 years, and that André has been impersonating Tony. Anna and Tony are reunited, and they remarry in May 2008. Tony is thought to be killed after suffering a heart attack, after a struggle with Philip Kiriakis at the pier results in a fall.

Thinking Tony has died, Anna leaves Salem on April 2, 2009. Sydney DiMera is kidnapped in December 2009. On December 18, 2009, Anna is shown on-screen, revealing to the audience as Sydney's kidnapper. In January 2010, it is revealed that EJ DiMera actually hired Anna to kidnap Sydney in order to keep her away from Sami. As 2010 progresses, Stefano manages to neutralize her from revealing EJ's part in Sydney's kidnapping, last being seen ambushed in hospital in June 2010. Carrie mentions Anna in a conversation to Austin in December 2011. In January 2017, Anna is seen when Marlena Evans bumps into her in Europe, after Anna lets loose with a gun at a Prague café, following Marlena's trail in finding Stefano. In 2018, she is accused of murdering André, and Carrie defends her. In 2019, she finds out that Tony is alive. She is initially hurt and angry but later forgives him, and the two remarry.

== Reception ==
In 2019, writers from Soap Opera Digest cited Anna and Tony as one of the "Most Entertaining Duos" in American soap operas of 2019.
