= Christie Clark =

American actress

- Born: December 13, 1973 (age 52); Los Angeles, California, U.S.
- Years active: 1982–present
- Spouse: Thomas Barnes (m. 2002)
- Children: 3

Christie Clark (born December 13, 1972) is an American actress. She is best known for her role as Carrie Brady in Days of Our Lives.

== Early life ==
Christie Clark was born in Los Angeles, California, on December 13, 1972, to Craig and Cathy Clark. She has a brother, Kevin and a sister, Katie.

== Career ==
Clark began her acting career by portraying Angela Walsh in the slasher film A Nightmare on Elm Street 2: Freddy's Revenge (1985). In 1986, she began portraying Carrie Brady on the daytime soap opera Days of Our Lives. She had guest roles in television series The Magical World of Disney, Hardcastle and McCormick, Hull High and Life Goes On.

== Personal life ==
Clark married Thomas Barnes. The couple have three daughters: Hannah Bella (18), Emma Rose (16), Charlotte Joy (13). The family moved to Hertfordshire, England in August 2018. The three daughters were educated at Heath Mount prep school in Hertfordshire before attending Uppingham School, a traditional English boarding institution in Rutland.

== Filmography ==
=== Film ===
Year	Title	Role	Notes
1985	A Nightmare on Elm Street 2: Freddy's Revenge	Angela Walsh	
1992	Children of the Corn II: The Final Sacrifice	Lacey Hellerstat	

=== Television ===
Year	Title	Role	Notes
1985	Hardcastle and McCormick	Erin Whitman	Episode: "You're Sixteen, You're Beautiful, and You're His"
1986	The Magical World of Disney	Shelly	Episode: "Ask Max"
1986–1999, 2005–2006, 2010–2012, 2017–2019, 2025	Days of Our Lives	Carrie Brady	1643 episodes
1989	It's Garry Shandling's Show	Cindi	Episode: "SuperGrant"
1991	Changes	Valerie Adams	Television film
1992	Life Goes On	Suzanne	Episode: "Udder Madness"
1993	Night Sins	Carrie Brady	Television film
1994	Winter Heat	Carrie Brady	Television film
2021	Days of Our Lives: Beyond Salem	Carrie Brady	5 episodes

== Awards ==
- Young Artist Awards: 1987 (nominee), 1988 (nominee), 1989 (nominee), 1990 (nominee)
- Daytime Emmy Awards: Outstanding Younger Actress: 1997 (nominee), 1998 (nominee)
