= Nicole Avant (The Bold and the Beautiful) =

Fictional character from The Bold and the Beautiful

- The Bold and the Beautiful character
- Portrayed by: Reign Edwards
- Duration: 2015–18
- First appearance: January 16, 2015
- Last appearance: January 18, 2018
- Introduced by: Bradley Bell
In-universe information
- Other names: Nicole Dominguez
- Occupation: Jewelry model Student
- Father: Julius Avant
- Mother: Vivienne Avant
- Sisters: Maya Avant
- Half-sisters: Sasha Thompson
- Husband: Zende Forrester Dominguez (2017–20)
- Daughters: Lizzy Forrester
- Grandfathers: Myron Avant
- Uncles: Claude Avant
- Aunts: Maisie Avant; Caroline; Carleen
- Nieces: Lizzy Forrester (legal)
- First cousins: Alexander Avant

Nicole Avant is a fictional character from the CBS soap opera, The Bold and the Beautiful, played by Reign Edwards. The character and casting was announced in December 2014 and Edwards' first appearance as Nicole aired on January 16, 2015. Edwards was the youngest person in the audition for the role and she had previously watched the soap. Nicole was introduced as the younger sister of established character Maya Avant (Karla Mosley) and her initial storylines see Nicole move to Los Angeles and live with Maya and her partner Rick Forrester (Jacob Young). Maya initially is uncomfortable with Nicole living with them and Maya later comes out as a transgender to her sister. Anna Maria Horsford and Obba Babatundé were later as Maya and Nicole's conservative parents, Vivienne Avant and Julius Avant, which further explored the Avant family. Nicole also starts interning at the fashion company Forrest Creations and begins dating Rick's nephew, Zende Forrester Domínguez (Rome Flynn).

Nicole later becomes a surrogate for Rick and Maya, which causes issues in her relationship with Zende. Edwards did lots of research for the storyline and watched various YouTube videos regarding pregnancy and giving birth. When Zende and Nicole break up, he dates Sasha Thompson (Felisha Cooper), who is revealed to be Nicole and Maya's paternal half-sister. When Nicole gives birth to the baby, Lizzy Forrester, a song called "These Are The Moments" accompanied the scenes, which was sung and co-written by Edwards. Zende and Nicole get back together but face further obstacles when Sasha lies that she is pregnant. Zende later cheats on Nicole with Sasha when Nicole considers being a surrogate again for Rick and Maya. Nicole and Zende eventually get married, but Nicole is pressured by her father to take custody of Lizzy when she finds out that she may be infertile, though Nicole does not do this. Edwards' final appearance as Nicole aired on January 18, 2018. Nicole has been well received by critics, who have commented on her selfless nature for being a surrogate for Maya. For her role as Nicole, Edwards received three consecutive nominations for Daytime Emmy Award for Outstanding Younger Actress in a Drama Series.

== Casting ==
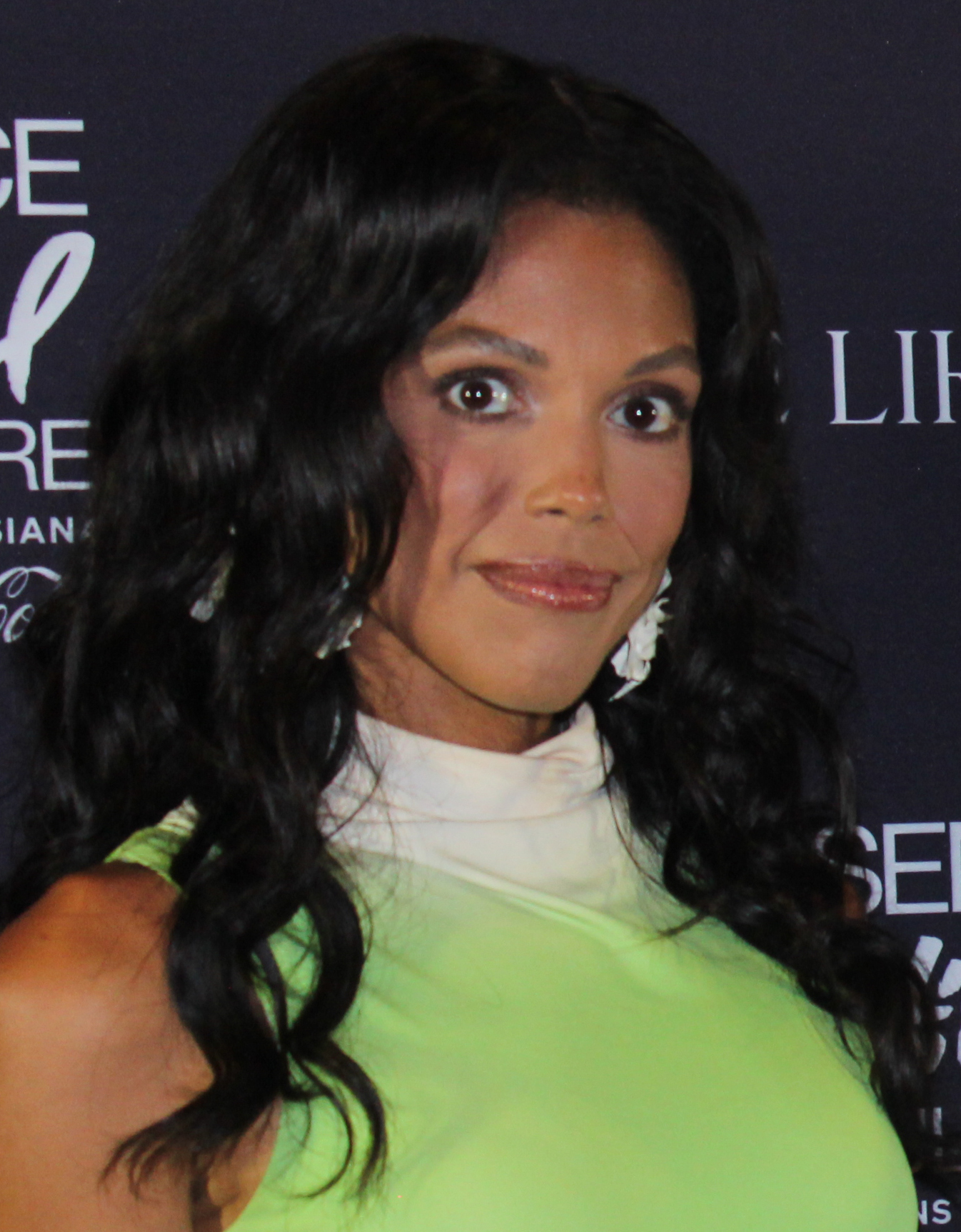
Nicole was introduced as the sister of Maya, played by Karla Mosley (pictured in 2025)

In December 2, 2014, it was announced that Reign Edwards had been cast on the American soap opera The Bold and the Beautiful as Nicole Avant, the younger sister of established character Maya Avant (Karla Mosley), in a contract role. Edwards began filming for the role on the day of the announcement. Edwards revealed to Soap Opera Digest on her 18th birthday that she was the youngest person in the audition and did not expect to get the role, despite feeling good about it. Her mother could not believe it when she found out Edwards got the role as she was a fan of The Bold and the Beautiful, with Edwards believing that her mother would be "pretty cool with Nicole". Of her character, Edwards revealed, "I think Nicole is going to bring something pretty cool to the table for everybody. She's Maya's little sister, so they're going to have some similarities but they'll also have their differences, too. You'll really get to see that." Edwards revealed that she sung to executive producer Bradley Bell during her two callbacks.

Edwards' first episode as Nicole originally aired on January 16, 2015. Edwards appeared in over 250 episodes of The Bold and the Beautiful as Nicole. She believed that The Bold and the Beautiful stood out as it is "bold" and "tells stories that a lot of people are scared of telling", adding, "We put in so much work to try to ensure that we portray the story as convincingly as possible. We touch on social issues and have a great group of people working on the show". She praised executive producer and head writer Bradley Bell and the strong work ethic of the cast and crew, explaining, "We sit there, go through lines and pour our hearts and souls out on screen. We work well together and that energy comes through on television, and I think that is what people like. On set we are like family". Edwards later credited the soap for teaching her a lot, especially, "That knowing yourself is really important, especially when you're working on a character for an extended period of time. Knowing how to present yourself is something that I've really learned about — that, and how to take care of yourself as a person." When she left the soap, she felt that she was more prepared for other television projects, but realised that she had to sit longer with emotions in other television shows as opposed to soap operas, explaining, "Soap opera world, I could get through having a baby, crying all day, breaking up with my boyfriend all in one day and then go home and be like, 'Did that. Leave it there!' But in primetime, you do half of the breakup in one day and then you have to finish up the rest tomorrow".

Edwards' final appearance as Nicole originally aired on January 18, 2018.

== Development ==
Upon Nicole's introduction, she moves to Los Angeles and the Forrester Mansion with Maya and her boyfriend Rick Forrester (Jacob Young); however, Maya appears to be determined to get Nicole away from her and Rick and out of their home. A CBS Daytime promo was released in March 2015 which revealed that Nicole knows a secret regarding Maya. A few days after the promo was released, Nicole reveals to Maya that she knows Maya was assigned as male at birth and was named Myron, leading to Maya coming out as a transgender woman to Nicole and viewers. The reveal had not been announced before the airing of the episode; Young and soap opera journalist Michael Fairman had speculated that Nicole could be Maya's daughter, which Young believed was "so classic soap opera" but also too obvious. Mosley enjoyed working with Edwards, calling her "amazing" and commenting, "I call her my 18-year-old teacher. She is so good. Both Karla and Reign, and Maya and Nicole, have a great balance. Reign is so grounded and fabulous". Mosley also revealed in April 2015 that The Bold and the Beautiful executive producer and head writer Bradley Bell that Maya and Nicole's parents would be introduced to the soap. That June, it was announced that Anna Maria Horsford and Obba Babatundé had been cast as Maya and Nicole's parents, Vivienne Avant and Julius Avant. They made their debuts the following month, with their first storyline seeing Julius want to take Nicole away from Los Angeles and back to Illinois to get away from Maya's supposed influence. The parents were dubbed as being "ultraconservative". Horsford said that the Avant family reunion had opened her heart in many levels and revealed, "The Avants may be damaged but they're still intact, held together with Krazy Glue". Edwards noted how all of the actors of the Avant family are singers.

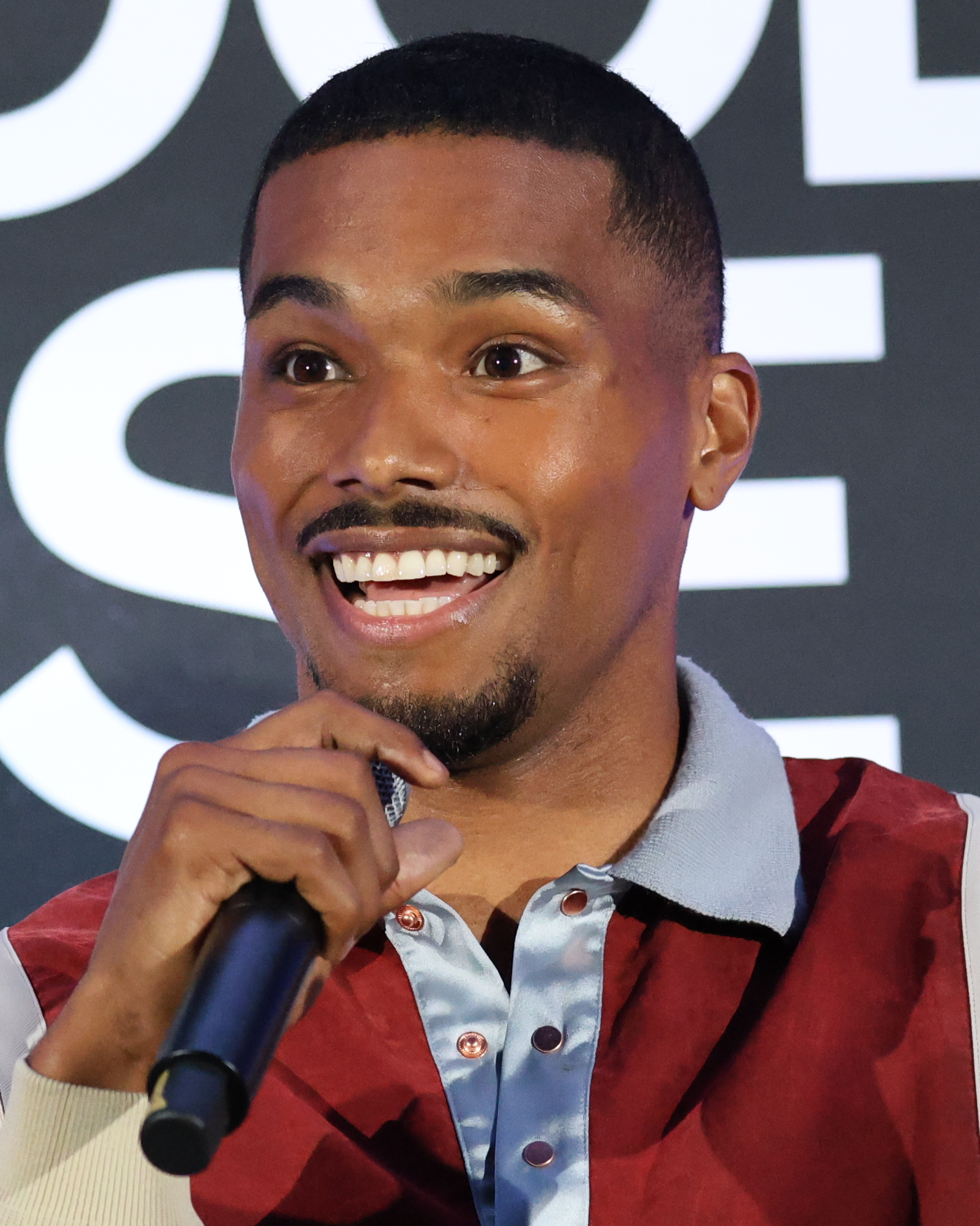
Rome Flynn (pictured) played Zende, Nicole's love interest

In 2015, Nicole, who is sexually inexperienced, begins dating Rick's adoptive nephew Zende Forrester Domínguez (Rome Flynn), and he becomes her first boyfriend. That same year, Maya and Rick – who cannot have biological children and do not want to adopt – ask Nicole to be a surrogate mother to carry their baby, which she accepts. Vivienne and Julius are against this and try to stop it, but Nicole undergoes the insemination procedure regardless. Edwards said that she would be going "crazy" if she was faced with the same pressure, commenting, "Nicole just started a new life in a new city, and she has a new job as an intern at Forrester Creations—the kind of job any young person interested in fashion would kill for. But she has all this because of Maya. She owes her sister everything." To stop Nicole, Julius tries to get Zende on his side and convinces him that the baby is a "deal breaker" for their relationship; Flynn explained, "Zende's love for Nicole is very deep and at first he's willing to put his feelings and concerns aside to join her on this ride. But Julius makes him question that." Nicole dislikes hearing this and whilst she believes that Zende should wait for her if he loves her, she is also worried about the "reality" of the situation and how Zende will feel about Nicole carrying another man's baby. Flynn also noted that unlike most surrogates, Nicole will be living in the same house as Rick, Maya and the baby; the actor added, "This is a lot to lay on someone as young and vulnerable as Nicole. In the long run, it could be immensely damaging. There could be no end to the problems". Edwards noted that even though Nicole is not getting with someone else, it is still a "very hard pill" for Zende to swallow. The actress joked that it was certain that Twitter would "explode" because of the plot. In the plot, Zende later admits to Nicole that he cannot handle her surrogacy and says that maybe a "better man" could.

Edwards did a lot of research for the surrogacy plot, watching shows such as Teen Mom and YouTube videos to assist her research on playing a surrogate mother and for her giving birth scenes. She had seen her mother give birth to her sister and she spoke to several parents that she knew, included Flynn, who had a daughter when he was Nicole's age. Edwards recalled that she saw a "heart-breaking" video where a woman was giving her child up for adoption and was saddened by giving her baby away, which was similar to Nicole's situation; she explained, "It added a bit of layer. I really needed to bring that element to it and do the role justice". Edwards said that the YouTube videos she watched that had commentary of how pregnancy feels in week-by-week updates significantly improved her performance, commenting, "By the time I shot the birthing scenes, I felt like I'd really delivered a baby. I was exhausted and lightheaded. I couldn't breathe. And I was really relieved to finally stop wearing that baby padding. It feels like I've been in that pregnancy belly forever." She noted that her respect for pregnant women had grown and said that if she gives birth in the future, it would be "nothing even remotely comparable to the way I did it on TV". Edwards believed that the birth of Rick and Maya's baby would be a notable moment in Nicole's life and thought the character was so naïve that she does not realise how the birth will affect her. She explained that Nicole would always feel connected to her child, saying in an interview, "It's a real bond. It's also her first child, so that's huge, too. It's not like she has children of her own or is a professional surrogate who's been through this before. We'll see where that bond goes". The actress also teased viewers would see the "ups and downs" of Nicole's relationship with Zende and that viewers would see how the pair still love each other.

A new character, Sasha Thompson (Felisha Cooper), who has a connection to the Avant family, is later introduced. Upon her introduction, Sasha is attracted to Zende and tries to drive him away from Nicole. Sasha wants to stay in town and likes the lives Maya and Nicole have built, but Julius tells her to stay away from Zende in order to protect Nicole. It is subsequently revealed that Sasha is Julius' secret daughter. Months later, Sasha is hurt and blurts out to Nicole that they are half-sisters, and Nicole's anger towards Sasha dissolves and she tries to fight for Nicole, deciding that the Avant family should know about Julius' secret. It is revealed that Julius had an affair and made Sasha lie about being his daughter from a young age. Edwards explained that Nicole has a problem with Julius as he rejected Sasha and Maya and this made Nicole lose two sisters and grow up really lonely. The actress teased that the reveal would cause Vivienne "unbelievable, horrible pain" and she also believed that it could not be more heart-breaking as the Avant family falls apart. Edwards also speculated that Sasha's mother could be introduced and that Nicole and Sasha would have to stop their mothers getting into a big fight.

Nicole gives birth to the baby, later named Lizzy Forrester, in scenes that originally aired in May 2016. The song that accompanied the birth, "These Are The Moments", was sung and co-written by Edwards. The song was also co-written by Bell, Casey Kasprzyk and Anthony Ferrari, and Edwards noted how Bell had been interested in her singing and music talent since her audition. In the plot, Zende is with Nicole when she starts having contractions. Zende has been thinking about Nicole all day and ends up leaving Sasha at the Forrester mansion to secretly see Nicole giving birth as he does not want to miss the experience, though nobody knows he is there. Nicole is emotional after the birth and she then sees Zende, who tells her that he was very wrong about the situation and that he is proud of her, leading to the pair kissing. In the delivery room, there are two doctors, Rick, Maya, Vivienne and Zende, which Edwards called "hilarious" and compared to a party; the actress also did not think she could have so many people in the room during "such a personal moment". She added that Julius, who is not very popular at that time, ends up arriving later with "his tail between his legs". Edwards explained that Zende is "overwhelmed with the birth and how awesome Nicole" and this leads him to admit he made a "terrible mistake". The actress also explained that Nicole understands why Zende acted the way he did when he had sex with Sasha –though she thinks he was stupid – as he has his needs, adding, "Nicole realizes that when she agreed to this pregnancy she really didn't think about Zende and his feelings. He was upfront and said he wasn't comfortable with her having a baby. But she put her sister before him, and now she can understand where he was coming from. They're both young. They're still growing. And they both could have made better decisions. No, he should not have slept with her best friend, but Nicole never stopped loving Zende and she knows he never stopped loving her. And that makes all this easier. It's the tug and pull of love."

After Zende and Nicole get back together, Sasha reveals that she is pregnant with Zende's baby, which Edwards called the "coolest twist ever". The actress explained that Nicole is devastated by this news, explaining, "She now fully understands what it means to bring a baby into the world-the incredible joy and beauty of that-and she's all set to have a happy life with Zende and now Sasha is going to have his first baby, which means she's always going to be in the picture". The actress commented that it was a lot to swallow and noted how Nicole will be alone whilst Maya and Rick will have their baby and Zende and Sasha will have theirs. Edwards believed that Nicole could potentially fall in love with Rick, or even Thomas Forrester (Pierson Fodé) due to both Nicole and Thomas both having a biological child of their own being raised by someone else. Nicole later strongly considers carrying another baby for Maya and Rick to make Maya happy, but Zende is against this, which leaves Nicole in a "quandary". After Nicole catches Zende having sex with Sasha for a second time, she confronts him; Zende promises it will not happen again and proposes to her, but Nicole turns him down despite still loving him as he has hurt her a lot. Nicole also tells Zende he has hurt her so badly that she cannot eat or sleep. Edwards told The Citizen in 2017 that she found Nicole to be a "very strong character" as she had grown a lot since her debut, explaining, "She is full of love, but sometimes the fact that she loves so hard gets her in a position where she is not at the forefront of things, and often forgets to put herself first and hence hurts herself by trying so hard to love others". Edwards believed that Nicole was too naïve, with the actress opining that Nicole was more naïve than herself. She thought that she and Nicole both "love loving" and are really strong women, but thought that they were different as Edwards does not "love to an extent" that she puts herself on the "back burner".

Nicole and Zende marry in 2017. Their wedding originally aired on February 15, 2017. In the storyline, shortly after having had his marriage proposal accepted by Nicole, Zende pulls together a quick Valentine's Day ceremony. His grandfather Eric Forrester (John McCook) agrees to host it and lets Zende hang Nicole's portrait above the fireplace during the ceremony. The Avant and Forresters give Nicole and Zende advice and the couple then share vows before being pronounced husband and wife. Later that year, Nicole goes to the doctor and says that her body liked being pregnant and she wants to do it again, and also says she is late with her period; the doctor then tells Nicole that she has amenorrhea, meaning that she does not have regular periods, and that her first pregnancy scarred her uterus, which may have made her infertile.

Following the news, Nicole becomes resentful and lashes out at Rick, implying that he and Maya are delinquent parents. Edwards said that Nicole's behaviour was unusual for the character, explaining, "The diagnosis is bringing out her fear that she did the wrong thing in giving up this child. Going through the experience of birthing Lizzy made her realize how much she wants kids. And her husband, Zende, really wants kids, too. They've talked so much about it and have been so sure it's going to happen. They're ready to start a family now." The actress further explained that whilst the doctor told Nicole that she may be infertile, Nicole is "freaking out" as she believes she will never be able to have more children. Edwards said of Nicole, "She's always trying to be a good person. She's always the one trying to make everybody else happy, to the point where she puts her own needs on the back burner. And, until this diagnosis came along, she was living in a world of distractions—starting her career at Forrester, falling in love with Zende, dealing with the news that her best friend Sasha is really her sister. So, now that everything has calmed down, this hits her hard." Edwards explained that whilst Zende is supportive of Nicole and is there for as he sees that the news has made Nicole "go inward", Nicole is also scared as she remembers how Zende previously ended their relationship and went "back and forth" between Sasha and Nicole.

Nicole is angry when she finds out that Rick and Maya have arranged for Pamela Douglas (Alley Mills) watch over Lizzy when they temporarily go abroad, with Edwards explaining that Nicole is being protective and that the situation is bringing out her "Mama Bear", and that Nicole feels that Rick and Maya do not trust her to look after Lizzy even though she gave her up to them. Of the situation, Edwards said, "In a way, I get it. If someone crosses a line with my own mom when it comes to her kids, she's not herself for a second. I don't think Nicole even understands why she's feeling what she's feeling". Lizzy later calls Nicole "Mama", which Edwards says is what Nicole wants at that moment, and Julius claims that Lizzy knows that Nicole is her biological mother. Edwards said, "Julius is always saying something he shouldn't but that gives Nicole a lot to think about—especially since her dad was so opposed to her being a surrogate for Maya. Nicole and Julius don't always see eye-to-eye and they really go at it sometimes, but there's real love there. This is one of those times when they genuinely connect". The actress said she was very excited for the storyline and believed it would be really "challenging in some very cool ways". She did not rule out Nicole kidnapping Lizzy or going off the "deep end", explaining, "The bond Nicole has with this child is strong and profound. And she's feeling very disrespected." Julius encourages Nicole to keep Lizzy, and Maya says that it is Nicole's decision. However, Nicole decides to fulfil her promise and signs the adoption papers for Maya to raise Lizzy, telling Maya that she is Lizzy's mother and always was. Maya later arranges for Nicole and Zende to move to Paris for a job opportunity, though Nicole is unaware that her sister did this as she is worried that Nicole is getting too attached to Lizzie.

== Storylines ==
Nicole comes to Los Angeles and moves in with her sister Maya Avant (Karla Mosley) and her partner Rick Forrester (Jacob Young). Nicole reveals to Maya that she knows she is a transgender women as she found her birth certificate with her deadname "Myron Avant" on it. Nicole keeps Maya's secret, but when Wyatt Spencer (Darin Brooks) flirts with her, she tells him. Wyatt, wanting to hurt Rick, tells the secret to his father Bill Spencer, Jr. (Don Diamont), who publishes it, outing Maya, which horrifies Nicole. However, Rick accepts Maya for who she is and Nicole attends the pair's wedding. Nicole interns at the fashion company Forrester Creations and develops an attraction towards Rick's nephew, Zende Forrester Domínguez (Rome Flynn). They begin dating but hit an obstacle when Nicole kisses Thomas Forrester (Pierson Fodé), but Zende gets over it.

Nicole and Zende hit further setbacks when Rick and Maya ask Nicole to be their surrogate for their child as Maya cannot have biological children due to being trans. Nicole accepts and is impregnated with Rick's sperm. Zende initially is supportive of Nicole but is uncomfortable with her being pregnant with another man's child and they split up. Zende begins dating Nicole's friend, Sasha Thompson (Felisha Cooper). Sasha reveals to Nicole that they are half-sisters as Nicole and Maya's father, Julius Avant (Obba Babatundé), had an affair with Sasha's mother and made Sasha keep it a secret. Nicole is furious at her father and tries helping Sasha. Nicole gives birth to Maya and Rick's daughter, Lizzy Forrester, and Zende tells her he made a mistake and they get back together.

Sasha attempts to break up the couple by telling them that she is pregnant, but this is revealed to be a lie. Zende breaks up with Nicole when she considers carrying another baby for Maya and Rick and he has sex with Sasha again. When Nicole catches them, she is heartbroken and breaks up with Zende; Zende proposes to her but she refuses. However, they later get back together when Zende's romantic gestures win her over and they get married. When Nicole finds out she may not be able to have biological children of her own due to uterine scarring from her first pregnancy, Nicole is heartbroken and Julius attempts to convince Nicole to not sign Lizzy's adoption papers so she can raise Nicole. However, Nicole signs them, saying that Maya is Lizzy's mother. Maya and Zende get concerned about Nicole being close to Lizzy and Maya arranges for Nicole and Zende to move to Paris for a job at Forrester International. Years later, Zende returns to Los Angeles and reveals that he and Nicole have divorced.

== Reception ==
For her role as Nicole, Edwards was nominated for Daytime Emmy Award for Outstanding Younger Actress in a Drama Series at the 2016 43rd Daytime Emmy Awards. She was nominated for the same award the following year at the 44th Daytime Emmy Awards. In 2018, she received a nomination for the same award at the 45th Daytime Emmy Awards. In 2018, Daniel Montgomery from GoldDerby noted that if Edwards had won the award, she would have been the second person of colour to get the Best Younger Actress award since it began in 1985, and reported that Edwards was the "front-runner to win with leading odds of 21/10" based on the collective forecast of users of the website. Chloe Lanier ending up winning the award for her role as Nelle Benson on General Hospital.

Reign Edwards received acclaim for her portrayal of Nicole

Following the announcement of Edwards' casting as Nicole, Ryan White-Nobles from TV Source Magazine believed that Nicole would be "more than a handful" if she was similar at all to Maya; he also believed that her debut would hopefully "provide a much needed boost to the show's younger core", which only currently had Aly Forrester (Ashlyn Pearce). He also praised The Bold and the Beautiful for "continuing to not only feature diversity, but actually write for the characters as well". Michael Fairman from Michael Fairman TV wondered whether Nicole would be a "little troublemaker" like Maya. Upon Edwards' debut as Nicole, Luke Kerr from Daytime Confidential wrote that she "quickly made an impression" by weighing on Maya's relationship with the married Rick and her portrait over the Forrester mantle; Kerr also believed that it was the "perfect" time for Maya's relatives to be introduced due to Maya being "on top of the world". Fairman questioned why Maya wanted Nicole out of her home when she first moved in; he also wondered if the sisters' relationship was "not what it may seem" and why Nicole moved to Los Angeles, asking, "Does she want to become part of the high fashion world and move and shake with people who have plenty of dollars?" Fairman speculated that Nicole could be Maya's daughter, but thought Maya was far too young to have given birth to her.

Reporting on Nicole being the surrogate of Rick and Maya's baby, Michael Logan from TV Insider called it a "Wild Plot Twist" and believed that the soap had "waded into Jane the Virgin waters"; he also believed that the plot could be controversial and called it "polarizing". He also noted that Nicole's relationship with Zende put "one more wrench in this mama drama". Logan also called it the "wildest pregnancy in daytime drama" and believed that it would get "even wilder" due to Sasha announcing that she is pregnant. He also noted how "no good deed goes unpunished". Jamey Giddens from Daytime Confidential called Nicole and Zende a "star-crossed couple" and believed they could not get back together if Sasha "has anything to say about it" as she was not wanting to break up with Zende. When Nicole found out that Sasha is her half-sister, Gidden's colleague, Mike Jubinville, opined that Nicole was "past her morning sickness phase and now she's reloading her guns to aim at her favorite target — big daddy Julius".

Fairman praised Edwards for the scenes where she gave birth, believing that she illustrated how she is "one talented young woman" and that she broke "hearts with her subtle performance". He also noted how there was drama between Nicole and Zende after the birth and noted that Nicole's emotions were "running the gamut from watching the baby she carried being put in the arms of her sister and spouse, and yet coming to terms with the wonderful thing she did for the couple". Fairman noted that Nicole did the "most unselfish of gifts a woman can do for her sister" and also believed the scene where Zende says he is proud of her and kisses her was the episode's "most touching scene".

Michael Logan from TV Insider called Nicole the "soap world's most stable, grounded heroine" and opined that The Bold and the Beautiful "broke startling ground" when Nicole was the surrogate for Maya and Rick's baby. Logan also opined that Nicole had become "snappish and resentful" when she learned that she might be infertile and questioned whether the character was starting to become crazy. Chris Eades from Soap Opera Digest believed that Nicole had "quite the dramatic run" on the soap opera and speculated that she could maybe return; he also opined that Nicole did not do a "very good job" at keeping the secret that Maya is transgender.

Tshepiso Makhele from The Citizen called Nicole a "girl in love, a heartbroken young woman, and a supportive surrogate" and wrote that Edwards "certainly proved her worth as an actress and gained a massive fanbase throughout the world for a character she portrays impeccably". In response to Nicole considering carrying another babby for Maya again, Janet Di Lauro from Soap Hub opined that Nicole "gives new meaning to the word selfless". In a poll run by Soap Hub on what Zende should do if Nicole is a surrogate again, Di Lauro reported that 69% of voters thought that Zende should leave Nicole if she goes ahead with it, commenting, "Enough is enough. Nicole's already done plenty for Maya [...] Clearly, Nicole is putting her sister's happiness before Zende's and her own. If she truly loved Zende, she'd heed his wishes". She reported that 21% of voters believed that Zende should support Nicole and "love her more than ever", adding that Zende should be proud of "the caring, generous woman she is and support her through it. She will need him more than ever to support her and her choices." The final 10% of voters believed that Zende should stay with Nicole but be distant, with Di Lauro commenting that Nicole deservces Zende to stick by her but that he would be justified to be distant from her, adding, "It's definitely something the two of them will have to work out and come to terms with, but who said relationships are easy?"

Montgomery from GoldDerby believed that Nicole was selfless when she gave up Lizzy for Maya to adopt; he also opined that the storyline was emotional and perhaps reached "the biggest emotional catharsis" when Nicole tells Maya that she is Lizzy's mother. He also noted that the scene where Nicole says she loves Lizzy so much "especially packs a wallop". Of the scenes where Nicole confronts Zende for having sex with Sasha again, Montgomery noted, "Long dialogue passages give Edwards opportunities to sink her teeth into meaty speeches, especially towards the end when she tells Zende he hurt her so badly that she can't eat or sleep. She has plenty of impact and empathy, and she keeps the audience on her side throughout." However, he noted how the breakup did not have the "glass-throwing, plate-smashing blowout" that often occur in soap opera breakups.

In 2020, Garren Waldo from Soap Hub opined that Nicole had been "certainly put through the wringer" despite her short stint on the soap. In 2022, Kassie King from The List wrote that viewers of the soap hoped that Nicole would return to "shake things up". In 2024, Charlie Mason from Soaps She Knows placed Nicole and Zende 38th on his ranked list of The Bold and the Beautiful's 40 Greatest Couples of All Time, commenting, "Why Maya's gorgeous sister split from the Forrester heir (then Rome Flynn) — also gorgeous, you'll recall — remains as big a mystery as the Bermuda Triangle. Maybe bigger. Honestly, we don't know how we'd measure that".
