= Melissa Hayden (actress) =

American actress (born 1967)

- Born: November 13, 1967 (age 58); Santa Monica, California, U.S.
- Occupation: Actress
- Years active: 1981-present
- Website: iammelissahayden.com

Melissa Hayden (born November 13, 1967) is an American actress. She is best known for playing the role of Bridget Reardon on Guiding Light from 1991 to 1997, returning for the final episodes in 2009. She won a 1994 Daytime Emmy Award for Outstanding Younger Actress for her work on Guiding Light.

== Early life ==
Hayden was born in Santa Monica, California. Her father was a car salesman and her mother worked part time in a pharmacy. She was enrolled in dance classes at the age of three. Hayden was ill from the ages of twelve to sixteen with an undetected ovarian cyst that left her paraplegic for a month. The cyst was finally detected when her appendix was removed. Hayden's mother also suffered from chronic illness.

== Career ==
Hayden was thirteen when she landed an uncredited role as a tap dancer in Pennies From Heaven. This was followed by another uncredited role as an orphan in Annie. Hayden appeared in the TV Movies Silence of the Heart and Not My Kid. In 1988, she had an uncredited role in the film Punchline. She guest-starred on TV 101 and had a recurring role on Almost Grown. In addition to film and TV work, she was a member of the California-based song and dance troupe The Young Americans.

Hayden had a recurring role as Mouse on General Hospital in 1989. She guest starred on a 1991 episode of Hunter.

Hayden joined the cast of the CBS soap opera Guiding Light as troubled teen Bridget Reardon. She received critical acclaim and appeared in memorable storylines from May 21, 1991, until her departure on June 18, 1997. She was nominated for a Daytime Emmy Award for Outstanding Younger Actress in 1993 and won in the same category in 1994. She also won a Soap Opera Digest Award in 1994. In 2009, she reprised the role of Bridget for the show's final episodes.

She appeared in the 2001 film Venomous. Since 2003, she has occasionally appeared as Agnes on The Young and the Restless. She has had roles in the films American Sniper and Silver Skies.

== Filmography ==
=== Film ===
| Year | Title | Role | Notes |
|---|---|---|---|
| 1981 | Pennies From Heaven | Dancer | Uncredited |
| 1982 | Annie | Orphan | Uncredited |
| 1988 | Punchline | | Uncredited |
| 2001 | Venomous | Katy | |
| 2013 | Nowhere Fast | Eva Trope | |
| 2014 | American Sniper | Receptionist | |
| 2016 | Silver Skies | Lisa | |
| 2017 | Unfortunate Circumstances | 911 Operator | Short film, Voice only |
| 2018 | American Nightmares | Leanne | |
| 2019 | When Day Gets Dark | Lizzy's Mother | |
| 2021 | Not Alone | Dr. Loizzo | |

=== Television ===
| Year | Title | Role | Notes |
|---|---|---|---|
| 1984 | Silence of the Heart | Rachel | Television film |
| 1985 | Not My Kid | Michelle | Television film |
| 1988 | TV 101 | Girl #1 | Episode: "Everything You've Always Wanted to Know About Teenagers (But Were Afraid to Ask)" |
| 1988-1989 | Almost Grown | Lisa Foley | 6 episodes |
| 1989 | General Hospital | Mouse | Recurring role |
| 1991 | Hunter | Meg Harris | Episode: "Cries of Silence" |
| 1991-1997;2009 | Guiding Light | Bridget Reardon | Contract role; Guest appearances |
| 2003;2011;2016 | The Young and the Restless | Agnes | Recurring role |
| 2012 | Hollywood Heights | Julie Dixon | 2 episodes |
| 2013 | Perception | Ashley Richards | Episode: "Caleidoscope" |
| 2014 | Rake | Beatrice | Episode: "50 Shades of Gay" |

== Awards and nominations ==
| Year | Award | Category | Title | Result | Ref. |
|---|---|---|---|---|---|
| 1993 | Daytime Emmy Award | Outstanding Younger Actress in a Drama Series | Guiding Light | Nominated | |
| 1994 | Daytime Emmy Award | Outstanding Younger Actress in a Drama Series | Guiding Light | Won | |
| 1994 | Soap Opera Digest Award | Outstanding Younger Leading Actress | Guiding Light | Won | |
