= Carrie Brady =

Fictional character from Days of Our Lives

- Days of Our Lives character
- Christie Clark as Carrie Brady
- Portrayed by: Andrea Barber (1982–1986); Christie Clark (1986–1991, 1992–2025); Tracy Middendorf (1992)
- Duration: 1982–1999; 2005–2006; 2010–2012; 2017–2019; 2021; 2025
- First appearance: August 4, 1982
- Last appearance: June 24, 2025
- Created by: Margaret DePriest and Sheri Anderson
- Introduced by: Betty Corday and Al Rabin (1982); Ken Corday and Stephen Wyman (2005); Ken Corday and Gary Tomlin (2010); Ken Corday, Greg Meng and Noel Maxam (2011); Ken Corday, Greg Meng, and Albert Alarr (2017); Ken Corday and Janet Spellman-Drucker (2025)
- Spin-off appearances: Days of Our Lives: One Stormy Night (1992); Days of Our Lives: Night Sins (1993); Days of Our Lives: Beyond Salem (2021)
In-universe information
- Other names: Carrie Roberts; Carrie Reed; Caroline Anna Brady
- Occupation: Attorney; Businesswoman; Model
- Family: Brady
- Father: Roman Brady
- Mother: Anna DiMera
- Adoptive father: John Black (Note: John was brainwashed into believing he was Carrie's father Roman and as such raised her for years. When the truth was revealed, Carrie still viewed John as a father figure and considered him one of her parents.)
- Stepfather: Tony DiMera
- Stepmother: Marlena Evans (1983–1994); Kate Roberts (2003–2005)
- Half-brothers: Eric Brady; Rex Brady
- Half-sisters: Sami Brady; Cassie Brady
- Husband: Austin Reed (1997–1999, 2006–present); Lucas Roberts (2006)
- Sons: Noah Reed
- Grandfathers: Shawn Brady
- Grandmothers: Caroline Brady
- Uncles: Bo Brady; Frankie Brady (adoptive); Max Brady (adoptive); Brett Fredericks
- Aunts: Kimberly Brady; Kayla Brady
- Nephews: Will Horton; Johnny DiMera; Jude Brady
- Nieces: Allie Horton; Sydney DiMera; Grace Brady (legal); Emily Lockhart; Mackenzie Horton
- First cousins: Shawn-Douglas Brady; Chelsea Brady; Zack Brady; Ciara Brady; Andrew Donovan IV; Theresa Donovan; Stephanie Johnson; Joey Johnson; Isaac Brady (adoptive)

Carrie Brady (also Reed) is a fictional character from the soap opera Days of Our Lives. Created by head writer Margaret DePriest, the role of Carrie has been most notably portrayed by Christie Clark, who took over the role in 1986 as a teenager. Clark remained with the series from April 1986 to January 1991 and from December 1992 to November 1999. She returned in 2005, leaving in October 2006, and returned in September 2011 as part of a reboot of the series. Her character left the show the following July, and in September 2016, it was announced that Clark would return as Carrie in 2017. Carrie, a lawyer, also returned for several weeks in early 2018 when her mother, Anna, was accused of the murder of Andre DiMera. She returned in June 2019 for the funeral of Caroline Brady (Peggy McCay). In 2021, Carrie appeared in the spinoff series Days of Our Lives: Beyond Salem. Clark reprised the role when Carrie returned to Salem in May 2025.

Throughout the show, Carrie has been involved in classic soap opera storylines. Her romantic pairing with Austin Reed (Austin Peck, Patrick Muldoon) led Austin and Carrie to become a well-known super couple. Carrie is the daughter of Anna DiMera (Leann Hunley) and Roman Brady (at the time Wayne Northrop, later Josh Taylor), though as a child she was mainly raised by Marlena Evans (Deidre Hall) and John Black (Drake Hogestyn). Today, John and Marlena still view Carrie as if she were their daughter. Carrie is a member of the Brady family, one of the show's two core families, the other being the Hortons. She has a long-standing rivalry with her sister Sami Brady (Alison Sweeney), as Sami has routinely tried to steal Austin from Carrie. Starting in 2011, Carrie and Sami began to get along better, but their closeness fell apart when Carrie fell in love with Sami's then-husband, Rafe Hernandez, in 2012. Rafe also fell in love with Carrie.

Clark's portrayal of Carrie Brady has earned her nominations for Outstanding Younger Actress at the Daytime Emmy Awards in 1997 and 1998. She won a Soap Opera Digest Award with her co-star Austin Peck for Hottest Romance in 1997. Additionally, she was nominated for Best Young Actress in a Daytime Drama at the Young Artist Awards in 1990 and 1989.

== Casting and creation ==
The role of Carrie was originated by child actress Andrea Barber from August 4, 1982, to March 21, 1986. She was succeeded by Clark, who was only 12 years old at the time, on April 14, 1986. Clark remained with the serial until January 14, 1991, when producers wanted to age the character. She went on to appear on other shows such as General Hospital, and appeared in movies such as A Nightmare on Elm Street 2: Freddy's Revenge. Meanwhile, the show briefly re-cast Carrie with actress Tracy Middendorf from January 10, 1992, to December 14, 1992. Clark returned on December 18, 1992, after being asked by producers. In June 1999, it was reported by Soap Opera Digest that Clark would exit that fall, and she left on November 19, 1999.

"Definitely. People have watched me grow up as Carrie on DAYS. I also feel like I've never wanted to play Carrie more. So yes, I think there is more story to tell. I just don't think it's over"

— Clark on her character Carrie.

In 2005, it was announced that Carrie and Austin would return to the series. Austin, played by Austin Peck, returned in July 2005 while Clark reprised the role as Carrie on December 2, 2005. Clark left the show a year later on October 26, 2006. The matriarch of the show, Alice Horton (Frances Reid), died in 2010. The show planned a two-week tribute and brought back longtime fan favorites to the show to pay their respects. Clark was included in the tribute and returned from June 23 to 28, 2010, as Carrie. She popped up again on a phone call with Sami on February 9, 2011. In 2011, it was announced that Carrie and Austin (Austin played by Patrick Muldoon) and several other characters would return permanently. Clark and Muldoon appeared on September 26, 2011. Their return was brought about to please fans and, in an attempt, to lure old fans of the show back.

They remained with the show for less than a year as producers again were re-directing the show. Carrie and Austin last aired on July 24, 2012. On September 15, 2016, it was announced that Clark would return as Carrie, alongside Peck as Austin, on January 11, 2017. Clark and Peck departed on February 16, 2017. Clark reappeared from February 1 to 12, 2018. In 2019, Clark returned for the memorial of Caroline Brady (Peggy McCay), airing from June 20 to July 4 of the same year. In September 2021, she appeared in the spinoff series Days of Our Lives: Beyond Salem.

On October 3, 2024, it was announced Clark would reprise the role, when Carrie returned on May 28, 2025. In July of the following year, it was announced Clark would again reprise the role; scenes concerning Carrie's return are expected to release in June 2027.

"Luckily, one of my best friends in San Francisco is a top defense attorney. I went to court with her and saw that it was actually something I could do. These people were just like me."

— Clark on being told Carrie would be returning as a lawyer.

== Storylines ==
=== 1982–1999 ===
Carrie is the daughter of Roman Brady and Anna Fredericks. Her mother leaves Roman while pregnant with Carrie, and Roman doesn't know his daughter exists until Anna returns with a four-year-old Carrie and leaves the girl in her father's and Marlena Evans's care. As a child, Carrie is at one point kidnapped and held captive by Stefano DiMera, who has kidnapped many members of the Brady family at various points. She also nearly drowns during a storm and falls into a coma after a car crash. When Austin Reed moves to Salem in July 1992, Carrie is attracted to him and also becomes the roommate and close friend of Austin's sister, Billie Reed. Carrie and Austin begin dating, but Austin's career as a prizefighter causes some strain in their relationship. Carrie becomes a finalist in Bella magazine's "Face of the 90’s" modeling competition.

In December 1992, when Austin fails to throw a fight, Carrie accidentally becomes the victim of an acid attack that was intended for Austin. The incident causes serious scarring to her face. Roman, who does not like Austin, tells Carrie that if she breaks up with him, he will not pursue any charges against Austin stemming from his involvement with the underworld of boxing. Carrie also feels that Austin will no longer love her due to her scars. As a result of both factors, Carrie pushes Austin out of her life. This gives her sister Sami Brady, who is attracted to Austin, an opportunity to pursue a relationship with him. Sami teams up with Lucas Roberts, who is revealed to be Austin's half-brother. Lucas is attracted to Carrie and Sami is attracted to Austin, and hence Sami and Lucas scheme to keep Carrie and Austin from reuniting so that Lucas can be with Carrie and Sami can be with Austin. Meanwhile, Carrie has successful plastic surgery on her face and is willing to give her relationship with Austin another chance. During a romantic ski weekend in February 1994, Carrie loses her virginity to Austin, after almost being raped by Sami's boyfriend Alan, who goes on to rape Sami instead.

Although Carrie and Austin are a couple, Sami continues to try to break them up and pursue Austin herself. Sami even wrongly blames Carrie for the rape Sami suffered from Alan. In March 1995, Sami drugs Austin and in his delusional state, he believes Carrie is there with him and Sami sleeps with him. Nevertheless, Carrie and Austin stay together and begin planning their wedding. However, Sami stops the ceremony by revealing that she is pregnant with Austin's child. At the time, Sami believes that Austin was the father, but she later learns that Lucas is the true father. When she finds this out, she continues to conceal the truth from everyone, even Lucas, for several years. Since Austin believes the baby is his, he feels he had no choice but to build a life with Sami and baby Will instead of marrying Carrie. However, Austin continues to be in love with Carrie. Unfortunately, the kidnapping of Will by Sami's deranged neighbor caused a situation where Sami and Austin, in order to regain custody of Will from the French couple to whom he had been sold, are forced to marry in France to satisfy the authorities there. Carrie, meanwhile, becomes good friends with Mike Horton. She also uncovers information that proves Austin is not Will's father. When Austin and Sami plan to marry in America, Carrie interrupts the wedding ceremony by revealing that Lucas, not Austin, is Will's father, and that Sami knew for a while. Austin marries Carrie instead. Sometime later, Austin becomes increasingly concerned about baby Will's well-being due to Lucas' drinking problem. Austin begins spending more time around Will, and hence more time around Sami, much to Sami's delight and Carrie's dismay. With Austin not being home as much as he spends time with Will, Carrie begins working more hours at the hospital in which she is employed. Over time, Mike develops feelings for her, and they slowly grow closer together. Carrie and Mike eventually have an affair, and Austin and Carrie divorce. Austin leaves Salem. Carrie accepts Mike's marriage proposal, literally riding off into the sunset, and they move to Israel together. That Christmas, Carrie is shown to have an ornament with her name right next to Mike's ornament on the Horton family Christmas tree. At some point in the following off-screen years, they split up (but it's implied upon Carrie's return that they stayed friends).

=== 2005–2006 ===
A few years later, Carrie returns to the U.S. and settles in Los Angeles where she is CEO of a company called High Style. Carrie tells no one she is back in America, but she is discovered by Lucas, who was attempting to take over High Style, not knowing it was headed by Carrie. He halts his takeover attempt and convinces Carrie to return to Salem as his feelings for her are reignited. Carrie returns to town and is surprised to see Austin in Salem as well. Although things look positive for Austin and Carrie's future, her sister Sami sees otherwise and, once again, schemes to break them apart and keep Austin for herself. First, she is able to have Austin and his company buy out Carrie's company High Style, Austin not being aware that Carrie has any association with the small business. Carrie, feeling betrayed that Austin took over her company, grows closer to Austin's half-brother Lucas. Sami, meanwhile, catches Dr. Lexie Carver having an affair with detective Tek Kramer. To ensure that Carrie will no longer want to be with Austin, Sami threatens to tell Lexie's husband Abe about Tek, unless Lexie helps her. Doctor Lexie Carver is blackmailed into telling Carrie untrue information: that Austin and Carrie both share very rare genetic markers and if they ever had children, the child will suffer extreme birth defects that could result in the baby's death.

Due to this bogus news from Lexie, Carrie decides it's best to move on with Lucas. Since she and Austin could never have children, she becomes engaged to Lucas. She soon believes she is pregnant thanks to a false pregnancy test, leading her and Lucas to rush their wedding date. Carrie finds out she is actually not pregnant and still has feelings for Austin. Carrie and Austin have sex on the roof of their apartment building, although Carrie is engaged to Lucas and Austin is engaged to Sami. Austin does not marry Sami and Carrie shows signs of relief. Prior to the ceremony, Carrie expresses to Marlena that she is still in love with Austin. Although she cares about Lucas, she is not in love with him. After she secretly meets with Austin on the roof of their building to have sex, Lucas, with the help of new neighbor E.J., catches them. After a bitter tirade from Lucas, Carrie is kicked out of the apartment she and Lucas share. Soon after, Carrie hands Lucas annulment papers and he signs them. However, minutes later, the Gloved Hand slides a note under Sami's apartment door, and Lucas, Carrie, and Austin discover the truth behind Sami's blackmailing of Dr. Lexie Carver to keep Carrie and Austin apart. After Sami finally admits the truth about her misdeeds, a furious Carrie attacks her. The two sisters fight, and afterwards Carrie tells her half-sister that she will tell everyone in Salem what Sami did.

Later, Carrie runs into Dr. Lexie Carver and reveals to her that she knows all about the bogus information Lexie was giving her due to Sami's blackmailing. Lexie tries to plead her case and apologize, but Carrie doesn't care and promises to pay Lexie back by reporting her to the hospital board and the AMA, upon which Lexie is subsequently fired. During dinner one night, Austin suggests to Carrie that they move to Switzerland, where he can work at the Mythic Communications division there and Carrie can reclaim High Style, her former company. Carrie agrees on one condition—that they get married first. The two immediately go to the Justice of the Peace with their signed marriage license and get married, but not before getting briefly interrupted by a drunk Sami; and Carrie disowning her. After saying their goodbyes to John, Kate, Marlena and Roman, Austin and Carrie take a plane and leave Salem.

=== 2010–2012 ===
In June 2010, Carrie returns for the death and funeral of Alice Horton. Whilst there, she reconciles with Sami. Carrie is seen again the following February during a phone call with Sami.

In September 2011, Carrie and Austin return to Salem for the tribute to the Horton Center. Carrie mentioned that she had become a lawyer after her company, Highstyle, which was division of the now defunct Mythic Communications, was forced to close down. Carrie then takes a job, as John's defense attorney. She works with brother-in-law Rafe to help find evidence that can exonerate John from the charges against him. In December, John is set free and is cleared of all charges. Carrie and Rafe continue to work together, eventually opening their own law/detective firm. Carrie and Rafe grow closer and are caught kissing by Sami and Austin. Carrie tells Rafe that she is in love with him and had separated from Austin, only to reunite following Abigail's confession that she did not truly have sex with Austin. Despite their reunion, Carrie can't shake her feelings of love towards Rafe.

After the lives of Marlena, John, Hope and Bo are threatened by Stefano, Carrie and Rafe are become trapped inside of the safe house, which is alarmed with a bomb. While inside, she and Rafe confess their love for each other, nearly having sex, Rafe admits that EJ is the father of Nicole's child, not him. After they are safe from harm, Carrie begins to feel weak and sick. She confesses to Marlena that she was late, which arose suspicions of a possible pregnancy. After taking a take home test, it confirms her suspicion. A suspicious Austin sees the test and assumes it is his baby. Austin is thrilled about the news, but Carrie isn't as much since she loves Rafe. Rafe tells Carrie that she belongs with Austin and her child, and that they won't work out. Carrie decides to return to Switzerland with Austin, and says an emotional farewell to Rafe. Before leaving, Carrie urges Rafe to reconcile with Sami, knowing that they still love each other deep down.

In 2014, Carrie supports Sami and Kate's decision to control DiMera's company.

=== 2017-2025 ===
Carrie returned for small arcs throughout this period such as helping her mother Anna and Marlena get out of prison. She and Austin return and get Anna released into their custody, but when Carrie's back is turned, Anna runs.

In 2019, Carrie returns for her grandma Caroline's funeral, and she sleeps with Rafe.

In 2021, Carrie and Austin return in Days of Our Lives: Beyond Salem where Austin is framed for stealing a jewel while Tony and Anna are visiting.

In 2025, Carrie returns for John Black's funeral and later attends Paul Narita and Andrew Donovan's wedding.

== Reception ==
The role has garnered attention for Clark, who was nominated for Outstanding Younger Actress at the Daytime Emmy's in 1997, and again in 1998. She won a Soap Opera Digest Award with Peck for Hottest Romance in 1997. She was also nominated for Best Young Actress in a Daytime Drama at the Young Artist Awards in 1990, and Nominated for Best Young Actress in a Daytime Drama at the Young Artist Awards in 1989.
