= Leann Hunley =

American television actress (born 1955)

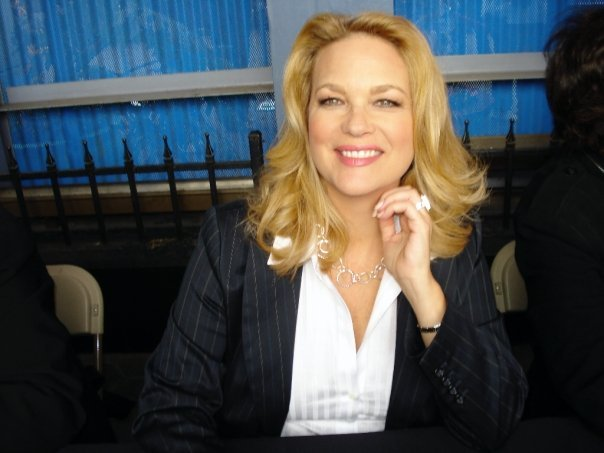
- Born: February 25, 1955 (age 71); Forks, Washington, U.S.
- Occupations: Actress; model
- Years active: 1977–present
- Known for: Days of Our Lives; Dynasty; The Misadventures of Sheriff Lobo; Dawson's Creek
- Spouse: Bill Sheridan (m. 1980–2001)
- Awards: Daytime Emmy Award for Outstanding Supporting Actress in a Drama Series

Leann Hunley (born February 25, 1955) is an American television actress. Although she has worked in numerous productions, she is perhaps best known for portraying Anna DiMera on NBC's Days of Our Lives and Dana Waring on the ABC primetime soap opera, Dynasty.

== Early life ==
Hunley was born in Forks, Washington. Her father was a commercial fisherman and her mother a beautician. She is the youngest of four siblings. Her previous occupation is an answering service operator. Leann has worked as a model and won second runner up in the Miss Hawaii USA Pageant in 1977.

== Career ==
Hunley's first television appearance was on Hawaii Five-O, in which she played separate characters in two different episodes during the series' 10th season, 1977–78. After appearing as an unnamed female Colonial Warrior in four episodes of Battlestar Galactica, Hunley guest-starred on Mrs. Columbo and B. J. and the Bear before becoming a regular on the latter's spinoff The Misadventures of Sheriff Lobo. Her role as Anna DiMera on Days of Our Lives from 1982 to 1986 won her an Emmy Award at the 13th Daytime Emmy Awards for best supporting actress in 1986. For two seasons of Dynasty, Hunley portrayed Dana Waring, Adam Carrington's wife. She appeared on Aaron Spelling's short-lived Models, Inc.. In the first season of Dawson's Creek (1998) she was Tamara Jacobs, a high school English teacher who has a tempestuous affair with her student Pacey Witter. She also played Shira Huntzberger on Gilmore Girls in 2005, and has guest-starred in various comedy and drama series such as Just Shoot Me!, Strong Medicine, Raising Hope, NCIS, and Law & Order: Special Victims Unit.

After a 21-year absence from playing the role, Hunley returned to Days of Our Lives as Anna on June 21, 2007, recurring on the series until mid-2010. She again returned to play the role of Anna DiMera for a story arc beginning in January 2017, and has continued to make appearances on the NBC daytime serial as of February 2026. In 2021, Hunley also played the same character in the spinoff series Days of Our Lives: Beyond Salem which aired on the Peacock streaming service.

== Filmography ==
=== Film ===
Year	Title	Role	Notes
1993	The Beverly Hillbillies	Miss Arlington	
1995	Cops n Roberts	N/A	
2001	Your Guardian	Tanna Hildegard	
2012	Blissful Lies	Addison Hamilton	

=== Television ===
Year	Title	Role	Notes
1977	Hawaii Five-O	Longworth's Secretary	Episode: "The Cop on the Cover"
1978	Hawaii Five-O	Lucy Sutherland	Episode: "Frozen Assets"
1978	The Islander	Mac's Wife	Television film
1978–1979	Battlestar Galactica	1st Girl Warrior	4 episodes
1979	B. J. and the Bear	Dr. Winters	Episode: "Crackers"
1979	Mrs. Columbo	Judy	Episode: "The Valley Strangler"
1979–1980	The Misadventures of Sheriff Lobo	Sarah Cumberland	Main role
1982	Fantasy Island	Secretary	Episode: "The Curse of the Moreaus/My Man Friday"
1982–1986, 2007–2010, 2017–present	Days of Our Lives	Anna DiMera	Regular role
1983	Hart to Hart	Diane	Episode: "As the Hart Turns"
1984	Airwolf	Meryl	Episode: "One Way Express"
1985	Amazing Stories	Woman	Episode: "Remote Control Man"
1986	Knight Rider	Liz Preston	Episode: "Fright Knight"
1986	Hotel	Catherine	Episode: "Opening Moves"
1986–1988	Dynasty	Dana Waring Carrington	Main role (seasons 7–8); guest role (season 9)
1988	Highway to Heaven	Jennifer	Episode: "We Have Forever: Parts 1 & 2"
1988	Murder, She Wrote	Shannon McBride	Episode: "A Little Night Work"
1988	Simon & Simon	Violet Harlowe / R.J. Simmons	Episode: "Play It Again, Simon"
1989	The Last Word	Herself	Game show pilot
1989	Who's the Boss?	Lisa	Episode: "Winter Break"
1989	Wolf	N/A	Television film
1990	Designing Women	Gaby Langford	Episode: "The Mistress"
1990	Matlock	Leanne Wilson	Episode: "The Talk Show"
1990	Murder, She Wrote	Dana Darren	Episode: "Murder: According to Maggie"
1990	Lucky Chances	Eden	TV miniseries
1990	L.A. Law	Maura Fitzgerald	Episode: "New Kidney on the Block"
1991	Gabriel's Fire	Gwen Kidder	Episode: "Postcards from the Faultline"
1991	Princesses	Andrea Sussman	Episode: Pilot
1992	Coopersmith	Laraine Sands	Television film
1993	Silent Victim	Chrissy Lee	Television film
1993	Daddy Dearest	Pam	Episodes: "The Tortoise and the Scare", "Thanks, But No Thanks"
1994	The Nanny	Bobbi Jo	Episode: "I Don't Remember Mama"
1994	Models Inc.	Marcia Carson	4 episodes
1994	Heaven Help Us	Sarah Barnett	Episode: "A Match Made in Heaven"
1994	Murder, She Wrote	Lydia De Kooning	Episode: "Amsterdam Kill"
1995	Murphy Brown	Linda	Episode: "Rumble in the Alley"
1995	The Fresh Prince of Bel-Air	Joan	Episode: "As the Will Turns"
1995	Burke's Law	Leslie Livingston	Episode: "Who Killed the Centerfold?"
1996	Hudson Street	Elizabeth Owens	Episode: "One for the Monet"
1996	Lois & Clark: The New Adventures of Superman	Emily Channing	Episode: "Swear to God, This Time We're Not Kidding"
1997	7th Heaven	Rachel Grewe	Episode: "Say Good-Bye"
1998	Dawson's Creek	Tamara Jacobs	Recurring role (seasons 1–2), 9 episodes
1999	Pensacola: Wings of Gold	Lauren Wells	Episode: "Mishap"
1999	Horse Sense	Jacy Woods	Television film
2003	Strong Medicine	Renee Van Dyke	Episode: "Blocked Lines"
2003	Just Shoot Me!	Binnie	Episode: "Strange Bedfellows"
2005	Gilmore Girls	Shira Huntzberger	Episodes: "But I'm a Gilmore!", "We've Got Magic to Do"
2009	Law & Order: Special Victims Unit	Joyce Shepard	Episode: "Sugar"
2010	NCIS	Young Joann Fielding	Episode: "Mother's Day"
2012	Raising Hope	Francine	Episode: "The Walk for the Runs"
2021	Days of Our Lives: Beyond Salem	Anna DiMera	Miniseries

== Awards and nominations ==
Year	Award	Category	Production	Result
1986	Daytime Emmy Awards	Outstanding Supporting Actress in a Drama Series	Days of Our Lives	Won
1986	Soap Opera Digest Awards	Outstanding Comic Relief Role on a Daytime Serial	Days of Our Lives	Nominated
1989	Soap Opera Digest Awards	Outstanding Actress in a Supporting Role: Prime Time	Dynasty	Nominated
