= Hell Fest =

- Theatrical release poster
- Directed by: Gregory Plotkin
- Screenplay by: Seth M. Sherwood; Blair Butler; Akela Cooper
- Story by: William Penick; Christopher Sey; Stephen Susco
- Produced by: Gale Anne Hurd; Tucker Tooley
- Starring: Amy Forsyth; Reign Edwards; Bex Taylor-Klaus; Christian James; Matt Mercurio; Roby Attal; Tony Todd
- Cinematography: Jose David Montero
- Edited by: Gregory Plotkin; David Egan
- Music by: Bear McCreary
- Production companies: CBS Films; Tucker Tooley Entertainment; Valhalla Motion Pictures
- Distributed by: Lionsgate
- Release date: September 28, 2018
- Running time: 89 minutes
- Country: United States
- Language: English
- Budget: $5.5 million
- Box office: $18.2 million

Hell Fest is a 2018 American slasher film directed by Gregory Plotkin and written by Seth M. Sherwood, Blair Butler, Akela Cooper and from a story by William Penick, Christopher Sey and Stephen Susco. The film stars Amy Forsyth, Reign Edwards, Bex Taylor-Klaus, and Tony Todd, and follows a group of teens who are stalked by a serial killer while visiting a traveling Halloween carnival.

Hell Fest was released on September 28, 2018, by CBS Films via Lionsgate. It grossed $18.2 million at the box office on a budget of $5.5 million and received mixed reviews from critics.

== Plot ==
At Hell Fest, a traveling horror theme park, a masked man known as "The Other" kills a woman and hangs her corpse in the maze so it blends in with the props.

On Halloween night, Natalie goes to the theme park with her best friend Brooke, Brooke's boyfriend Quinn, Brooke's roommate Taylor and her boyfriend Asher, and Brooke's friend Gavin, who likes Natalie. Natalie and Brooke's friendship has been strained due to living far apart and Natalie's distaste for Taylor. On arriving at the festival, the girls run into a terrified woman trying to hide from the Other. Natalie, thinking this is part of the park experience, points out her hiding place. The Other kills the woman in front of Natalie. Natalie thinks the murder seemed too real to be a normal attraction. The group dismisses her fears until Brooke catches the Other stealing Natalie and Gavin's pictures from a photo booth.

While the others are gone, The Other kills Gavin first, crushing his skull with a mallet. Natalie goes on a ride alone while the rest of her friends pair up. The ride breaks down, and she is approached by a man who appears to be the Other. This is part of the ride, however, and the group discovers that park employees wear a mask similar to the Other's.

The group splits up and The Other finds Natalie but she escapes. Asher is killed when the Other stabs him in the eye. The friends regroup, but the Other traps Natalie in the bathroom stall. She escapes and tries to warn park security but they dismiss the attack as part of the park experience.

Natalie, Brooke and Quinn find Taylor has volunteered to take part in an attraction where she will be beheaded by a guillotine in front of a live audience. Park security prevents Natalie from stopping the show when she recognizes the Other's boots on the executioner. The stage curtains close and the Other approaches Taylor who, assuming he's an employee, asks to be let out. As she becomes increasingly alarmed, the Other straps her in tighter and raises the guillotine. After pausing to silently stare at her, he releases the guillotine, only for it to be revealed that the drop was done to a dummy, as would be originally intended for the show. Immediately afterwards, the Other sets the blade up for real to cut off Taylor's head. However, Taylor escapes when the blade fails to fully cut through. Freeing her hands, she escapes, and begins running through the festival screaming for help. The Other catches up with her and slashes her face while surrounded by festivalgoers. Quinn, hearing her screams, runs towards the two. Just as he reaches them, the Other stabs Taylor in the stomach. Before Quinn can react, the Other turns around and fatally stabs him.

Panic ensues in the park, The Other traps Natalie and Brooke in a maze. The girls are separated, and the Other corners Brooke. Natalie stabs the Other in the gut before he can kill Brooke. Police barge into the maze to save them and capture the killer. The Other, however, has escaped, and drives to his suburban home. He places his mask and the pictures of Natalie and Gavin that he stole into a cabinet with other masks and trophies from his previous kills. The Other's young daughter wakes up to greet her father, and he gives her a stuffed animal from the park.

== Cast ==
- Amy Forsyth as Natalie
- Reign Edwards as Brooke
- Bex Taylor-Klaus as Taylor Ann Smythe
- Christian James as Quinn
- Matt Mercurio as Asher
- Roby Attal as Gavin
- Tony Todd as The Barker
- Michael Tourek as Security Guard
- Courtney Dietz as Britney
- Elle Graham as The Other's Daughter
- Stephen Conroy as The Other
- Daniel Wilson as creepy Park Owner

== Production ==
=== Development ===
In December 2011, CBS Films entered negotiations with Neil Marshall to direct the film, with the hopes of spawning a yearly franchise akin to Paranormal Activity and Saw. Production was slated to begin in summer 2012 with Gale Anne Hurd serving as producer. The following January, Gary Dauberman was hired to polish a previous draft written by William Penick & Chris Sey.

Marshall would later depart the project leading to Jennifer Lynch signing on to direct in August 2016. Filming was then expected to begin in winter 2016. In April 2017, editor-director Gregory Plotkin boarded the project as director after Lynch exited. Screenwriter Seth M. Sherwood was brought in after working with Plotkin on the virtual reality horror film Black Mass. Akela Cooper and Blair Butler also worked with the director for individual rewrites.

=== Filming ===
Hell Fest started filming in Atlanta, Georgia and at Six Flags White Water in late February 2018, and wrapped on April 13, 2018.

== Release ==
The film was released in the United States on September 28, 2018.

=== Box office ===
Hell Fest has grossed $11.1 million in the United States and Canada, and $7 million in other territories, for a total worldwide gross of $18.1 million, against a production budget of $5.5 million.

In the United States and Canada, Hell Fest was released alongside Smallfoot, Night School and Little Women, and was projected to gross $5–7 million from 2,293 theaters in its opening weekend. The film made $2 million on its first day, including $435,000 from Thursday night previews. It went on to debut to $5.1 million, finishing sixth at the box office. It fell 60% to $2.1 million in its second weekend, finishing eighth.

=== Home media ===
The film was released on DVD, Blu-ray and Ultra HD Blu-ray by Lionsgate Home Entertainment on January 8, 2019.

== Reception ==
=== Critical response ===
On review aggregator Rotten Tomatoes, the film holds an approval rating of 41% based on 66 reviews, with an average rating of 5.1/10. The website's critical consensus reads, "Hell Fest might give less demanding horror fans a few decent reasons to scream, but it's neither clever nor frightening enough to leave much of an impression." On Metacritic, the film has a weighted average score of 26 out of 100, based on 11 critics, indicating "generally unfavorable" reviews. Audiences polled by CinemaScore gave the film an average grade of "C" on an A+ to F scale, while PostTrak reported filmgoers gave it 2 out of 5 stars.

Nick Allen of RogerEbert.com gave the film 1.5/4 stars, writing that "Hell Fest is a pretty bad movie that makes a great case for more slashing at horror theme parks." Keith Uhlich, writing for The Hollywood Reporter ultimately said "You've seen it all before, and better." Dennis Harvey of Variety also found the film generic, specifying, "Eye candy without much to offer the brain or emotions, Hell Fest is a competently crafted slasher film rendered instantly forgettable by its disinterest in character, plot, and motivation, let alone original ideas." Ignatiy Vishnevetsky of The A.V. Club gave the film a D+ and said "even slasher junkies desperate for a fix will find themselves bored by Gregory Plotkin's lame second feature...it delivers the tedious, heavy-breathing buildup associated with the genre, but skimps on the scares and the gory, gooey good stuff." Michael Nordine of IndieWire also gave the film a D+ and, while applauding its "vaguely feminist subtext," found that "for the most part Hell Fest simply adheres to long-established genre tropes." Brad Miska of Bloody Disgusting gave the film a positive review with a 4/5 rating, stating "Above all else, Hell Fest over-delivers on its promises, not just to be a hardcore, old school slasher film, but to take viewers inside a believable haunt. While Hell Fest may not actually be scary, the idea behind it is as frightening as anything you see in the news today."
