= Daytime Emmy Award for Outstanding Lead Actress in a Drama Series =

Annual acting award

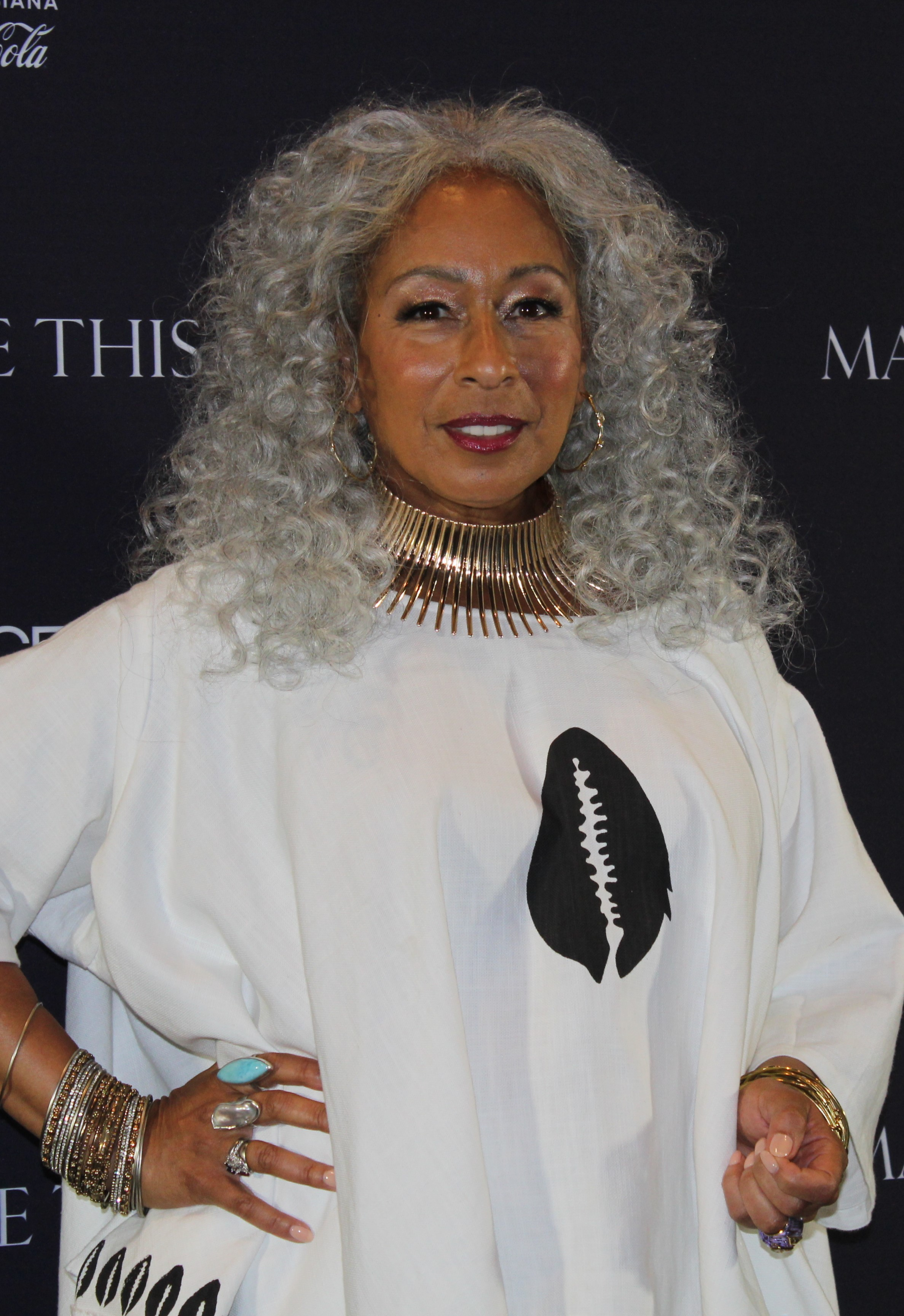
- The 2026 recipient: Tamara Tunie
- Awarded for: Outstanding Lead Performance in a Daytime Drama Series: Actress
- Country: United States
- Presented by: NATAS; ATAS
- First award: 1974
- Currently held by: Tamara Tunie, Beyond the Gates (2026)

Highlights
- Most awards: Erika Slezak, (6)
- Most nominations: Susan Lucci, (21)
- Website: theemmys.tv/daytime

The Daytime Emmy Award for Outstanding Lead Actress in a Drama Series is an award presented annually by the National Academy of Television Arts and Sciences (NATAS) and Academy of Television Arts & Sciences (ATAS). It is given to honor an actress who has delivered an outstanding performance in a leading role while working within the daytime drama industry.

The 1st Daytime Emmy Awards ceremony was held in 1974, with Elizabeth Hubbard receiving the award for her role as Althea Davis on The Doctors. The award has undergone several name changes, originally honoring actresses in leading and supporting roles. Following the introduction of a new category in 1979, Outstanding Supporting Actress in a Drama Series, the award's name was altered to Outstanding Actress in a Drama Series, before changing once again, to its current title, years later. The awards ceremony was not aired on television in 1983 and 1984, having been criticized for voting integrity. In 1985, another category was introduced: Outstanding Younger Actress in a Drama Series; one criterion for this category was altered, requiring all actresses to be aged 26 or above.

Since its inception, the award has been given to 30 actresses. Erika Slezak has won the award six times, which is more than any other performer. Susan Flannery and Kim Zimmer are tied for second place, each having won the award four times. Susan Lucci has one win from 21 nominations – the most nominations of any actress in the category. For her portrayal of Amanda Sinclair on The Young and the Restless, Mishael Morgan made Daytime Emmy history by winning the award in 2022, making her the first Black actress to receive this honor. This milestone follows Debbi Morgan's nomination in 2009, where she became the first Black woman nominated in the category. In 2026, Karla Mosley and Tamara Tunie of Beyond the Gates, in the soap's first year of eligibility, were both nominated, marking the first time two Black actresses were nominated in this category in the same year. As of the 2026 ceremony, Tunie is the most recent winner in this category for her portrayal of Anita Williams Dupree on Beyond the Gates.

== Winners and nominees ==
Listed below are the winners of the award for each year, as well as the other nominees.

Table key
‡	Indicates the winner

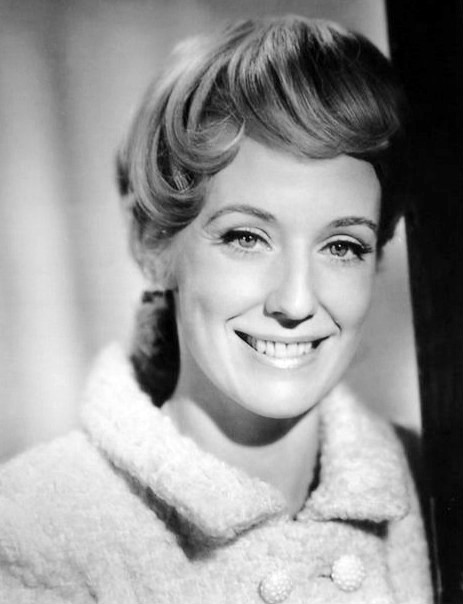
Elizabeth Hubbard was the first winner, for her role as Althea Davis on The Doctors. She was then later nominated eight times for her role as Lucinda Walsh on As the World Turns.

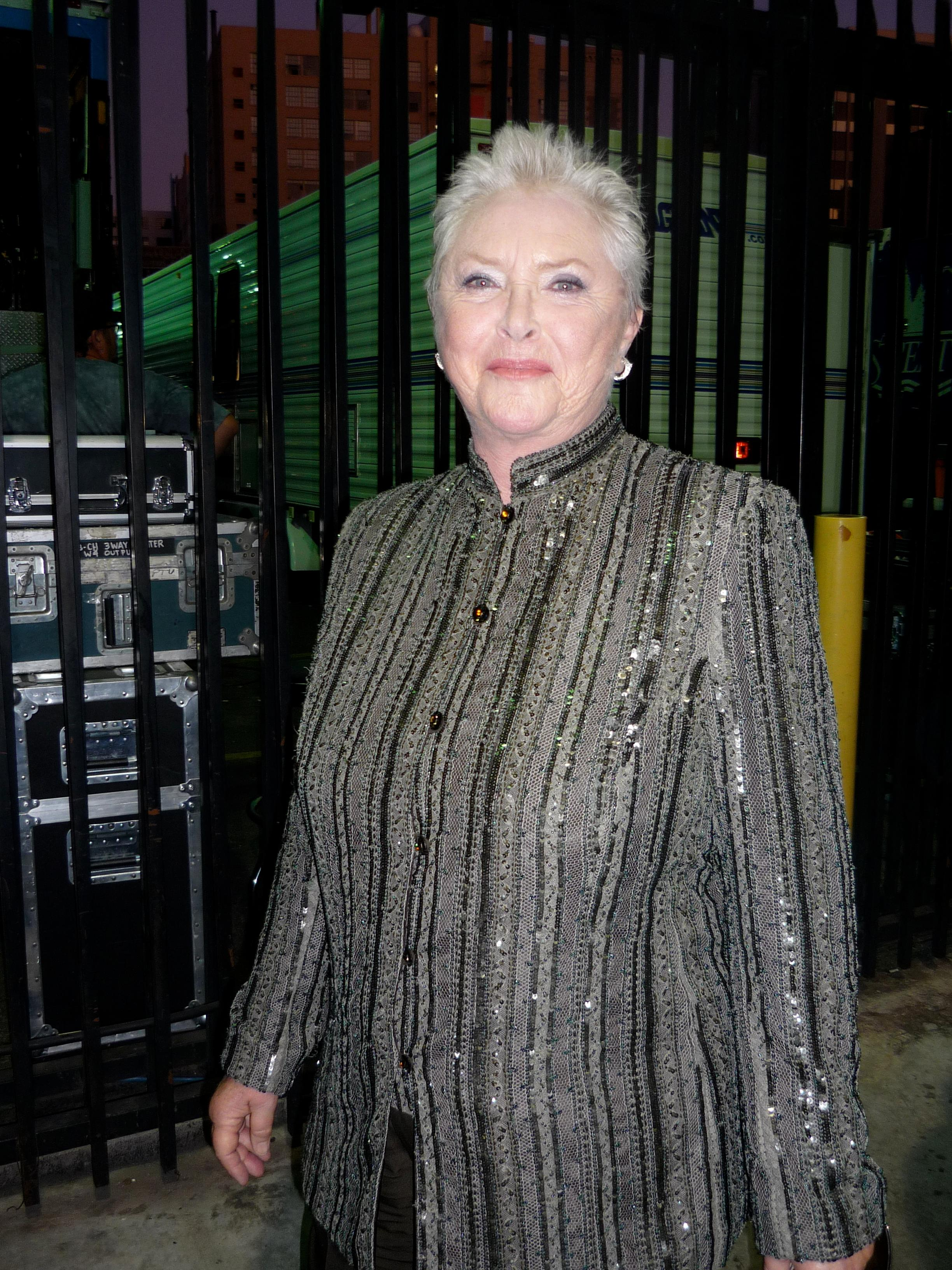
Susan Flannery won in 1975 for her role as Laura Horton on Days of Our Lives. She later received three wins, from nine nominations, for her role as Stephanie Forrester on The Bold and the Beautiful.

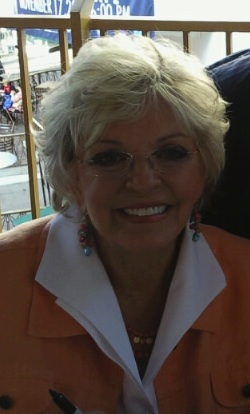
Susan Seaforth Hayes has been nominated four times for her role as Julie Olson Williams on Days of Our Lives.

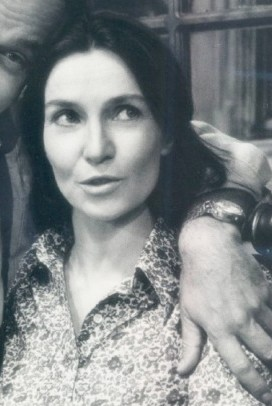
Helen Gallagher was nominated five times, and won three times, for her role as Maeve Ryan on Ryan's Hope.

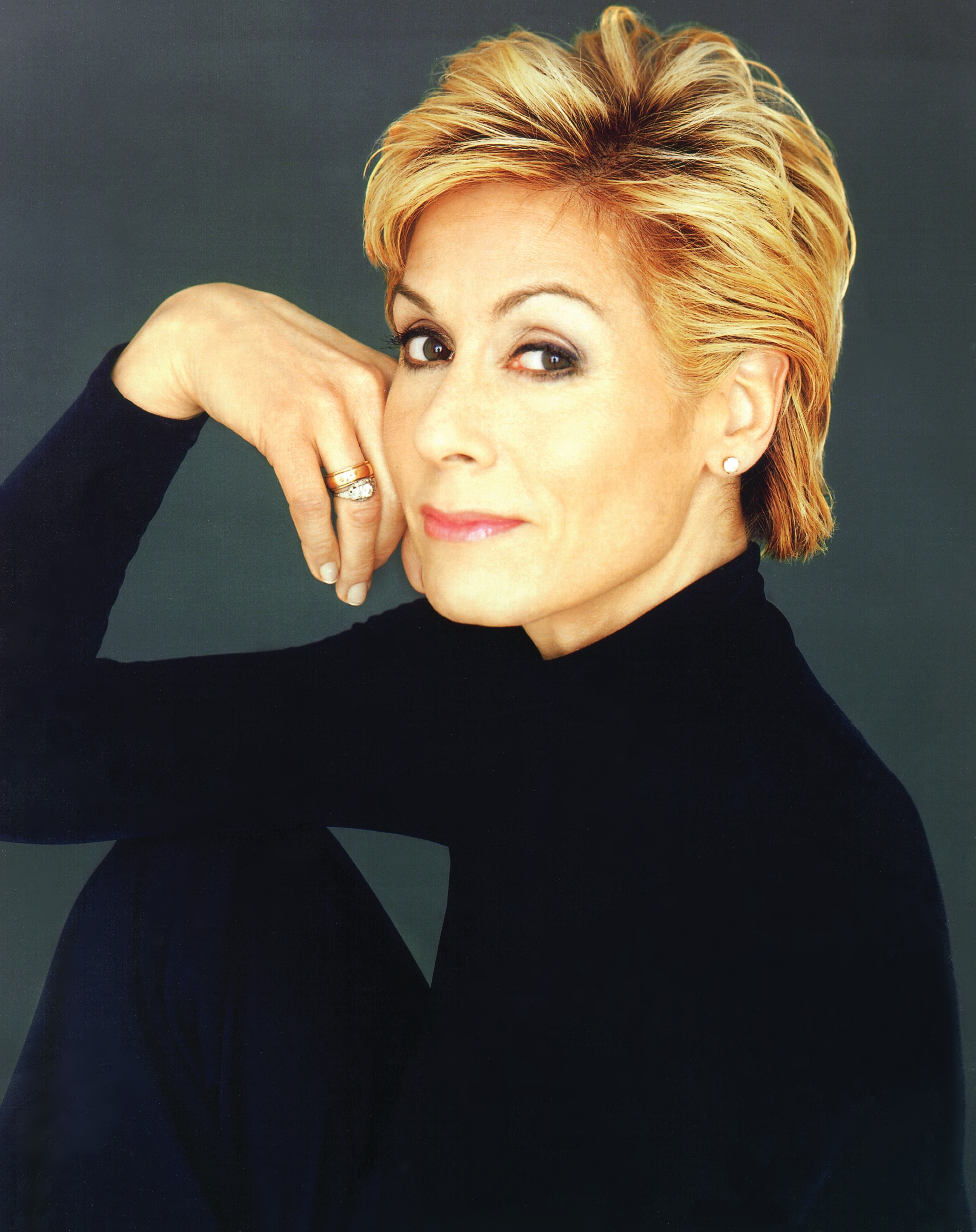
Judith Light won in 1980 and 1981 for her role as Karen Wolek on One Life to Live.

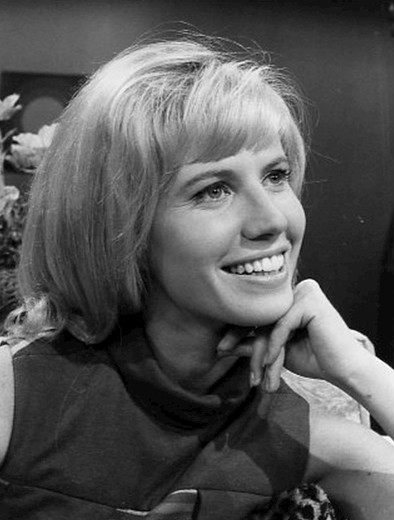
Leslie Charleson has been nominated four times for her role as Monica Quartermaine on General Hospital.

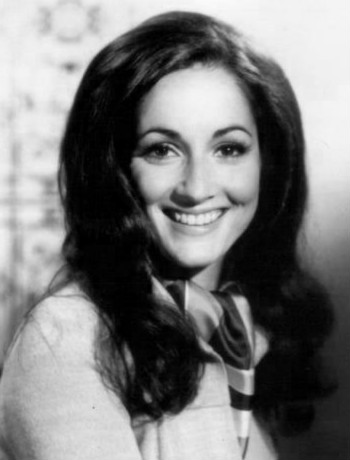
Robin Strasser was nominated four times, and won in 1982, for her role as Dorian Cramer on One Life to Live.

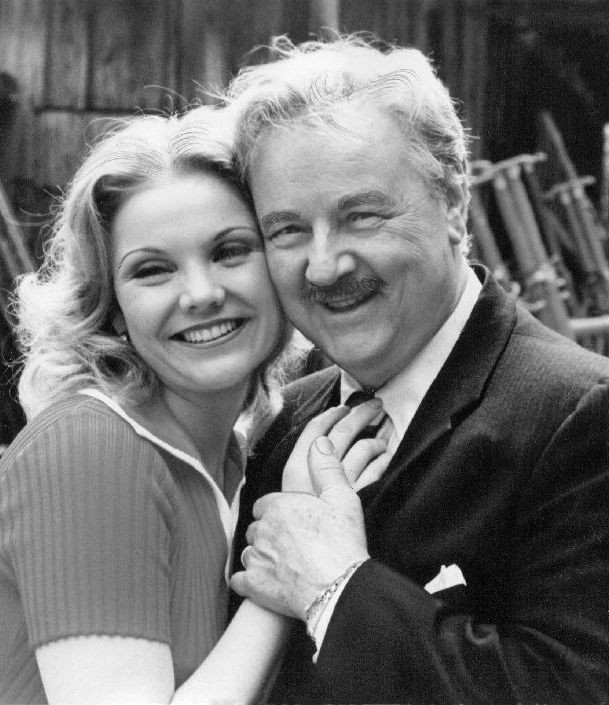
Erika Slezak (left) has received the most wins, for her role as Victoria Lord on One Life to Live.

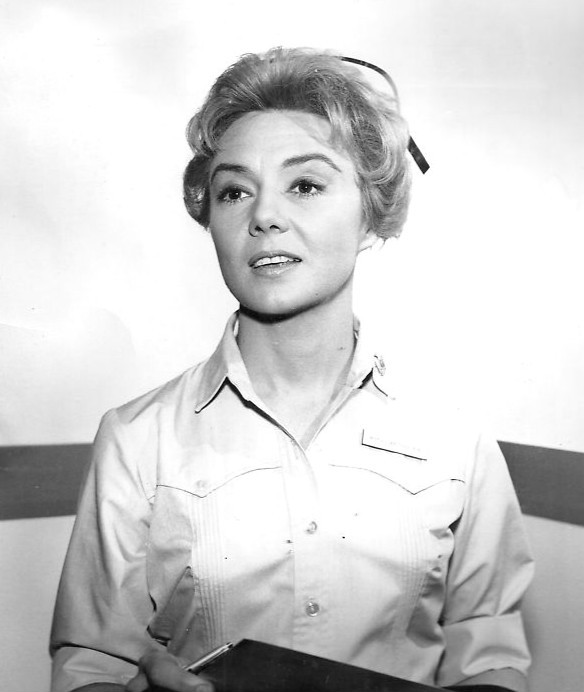
Peggy McCay has been nominated three times for her role as Caroline Brady on Days of Our Lives.

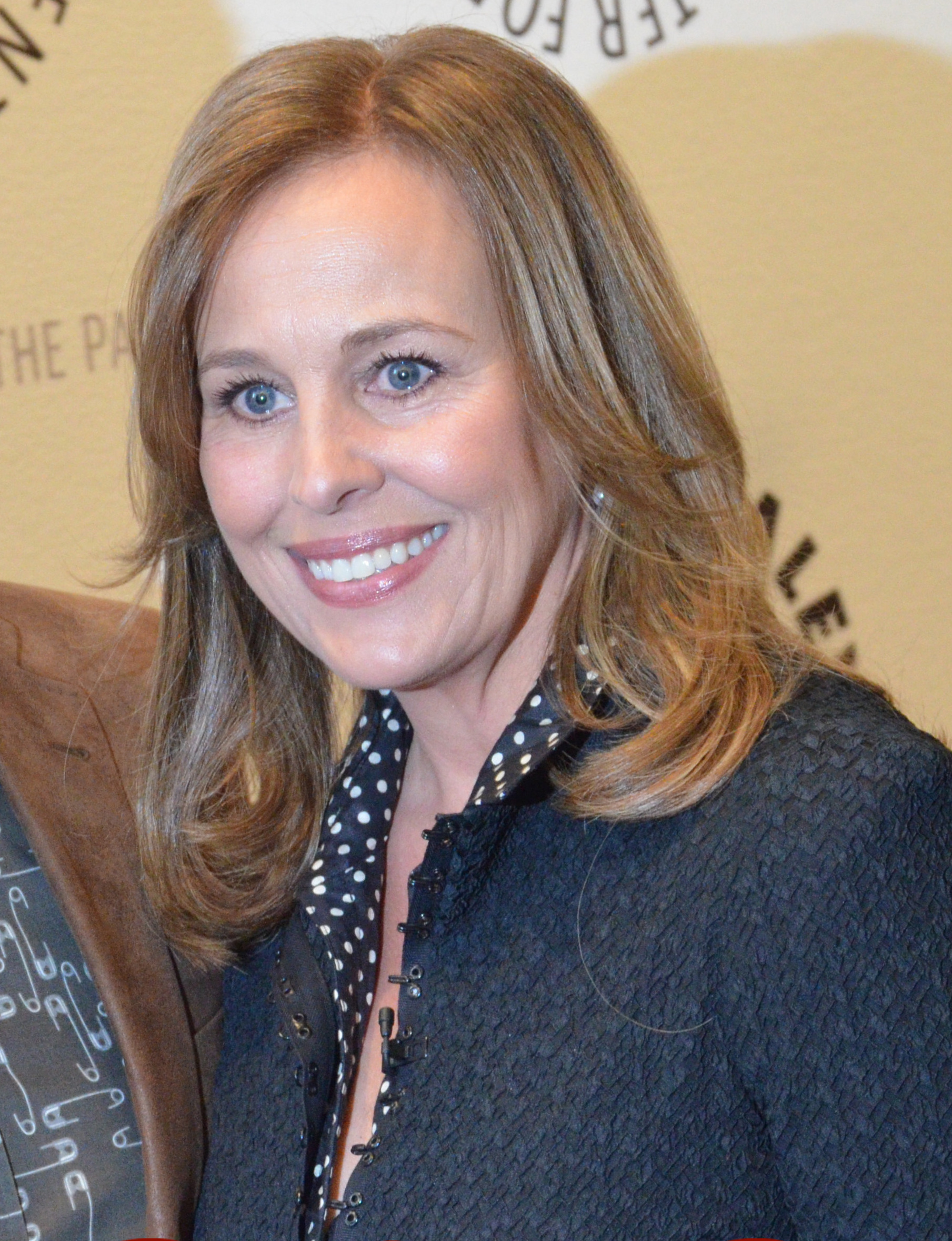
Genie Francis received two nominations (1997 and 2021) for her role as Laura Spencer on General Hospital.

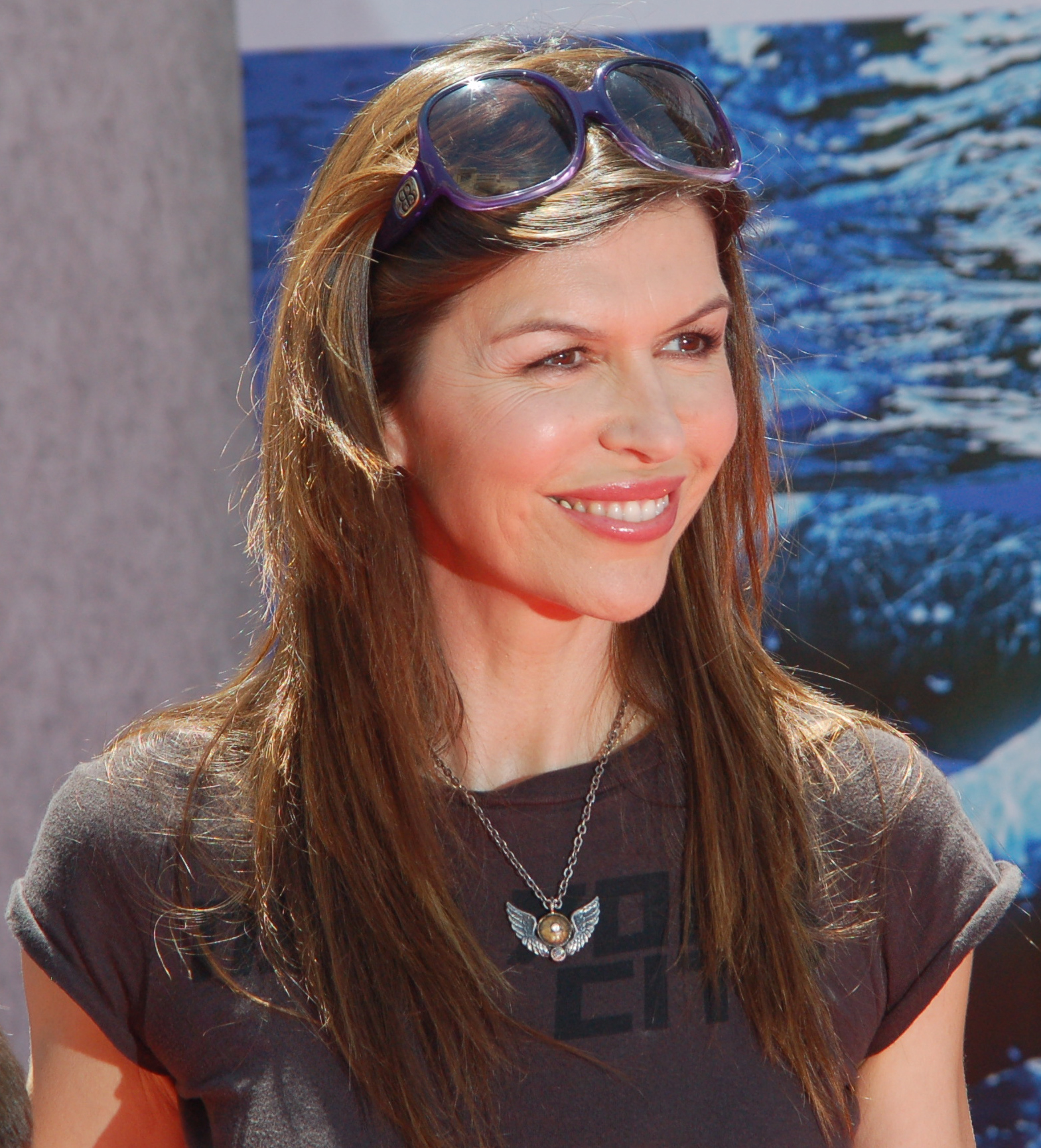
Finola Hughes has been nominated four times, and won in 1991, for her work on General Hospital. She was later nominated twice again, for her work on All My Children.

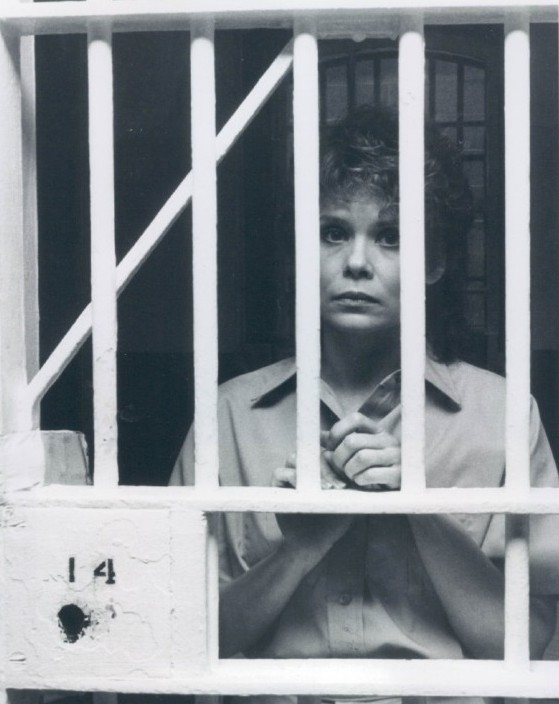
Julia Barr has been nominated six times for her role as Brooke English on All My Children.

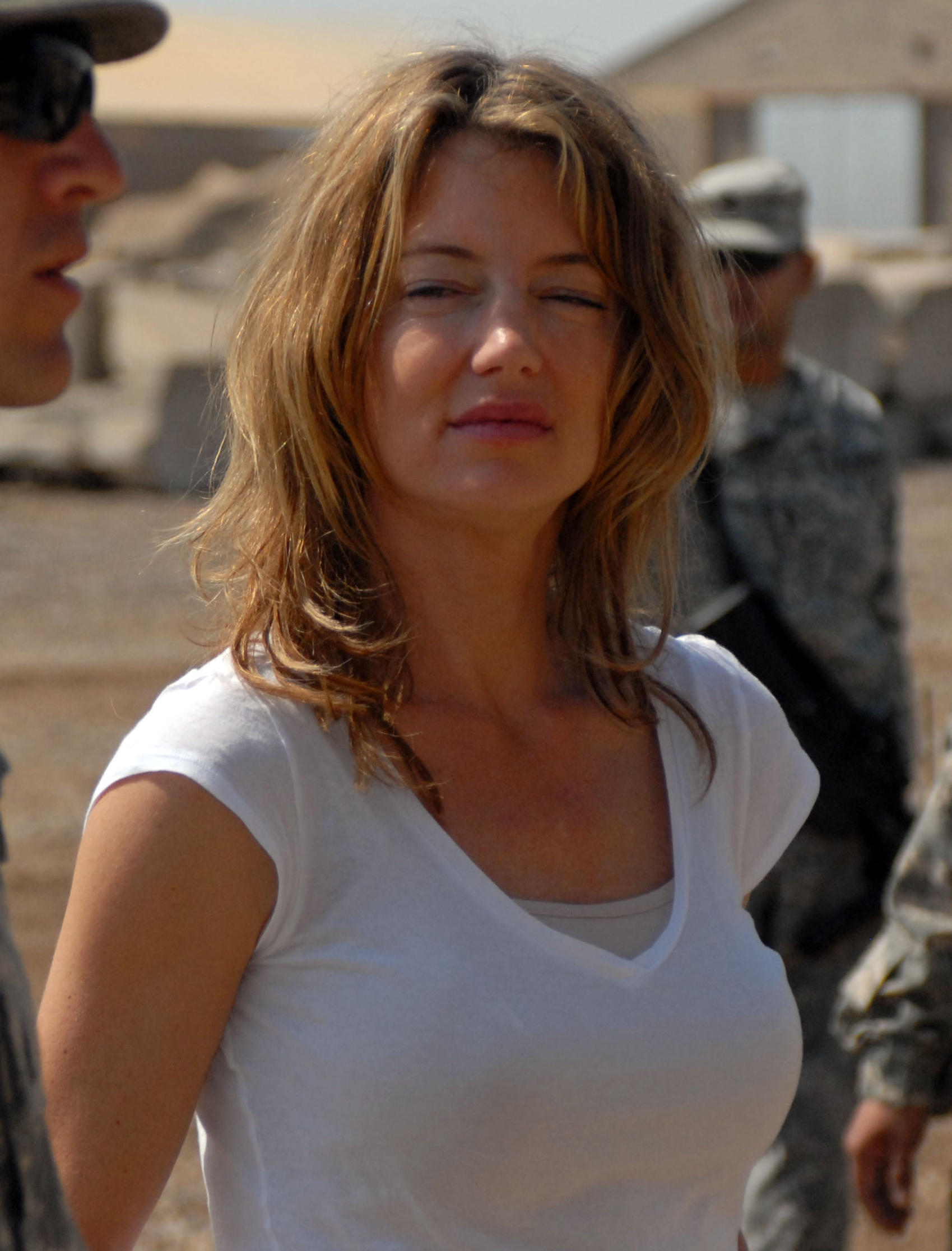
Cynthia Watros won in 1998, for her role as Annie Dutton on Guiding Light.

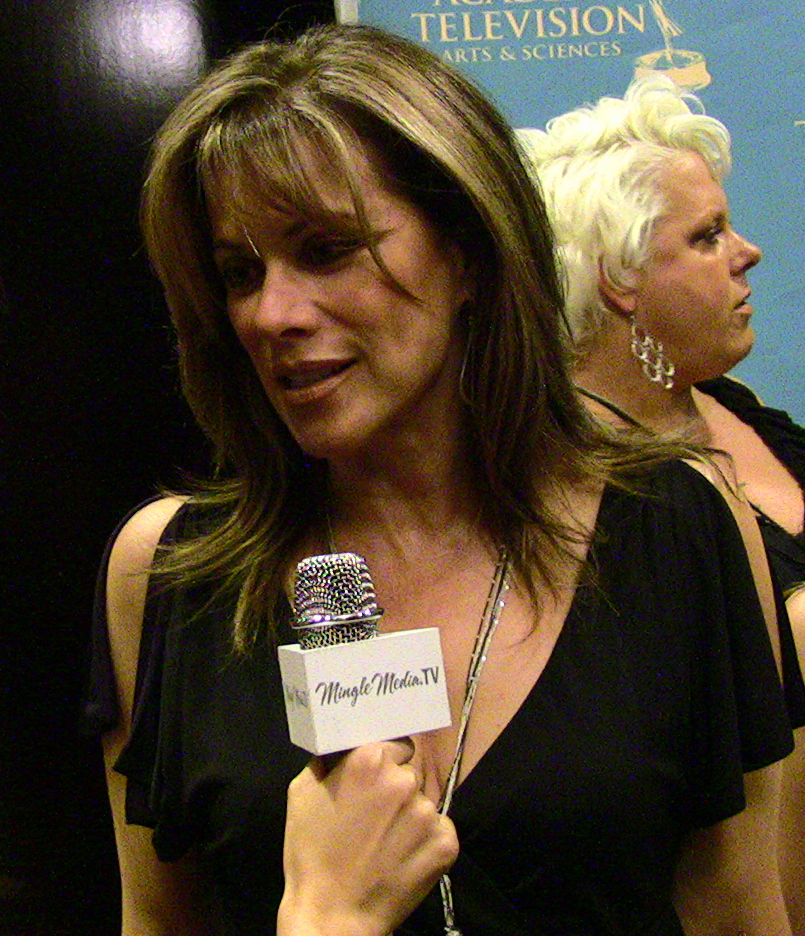
Nancy Lee Grahn has been nominated six times (2003, 2004, 2005, 2017, 2018, and 2021) and won in 2025 for her role as Alexis Davis on General Hospital.

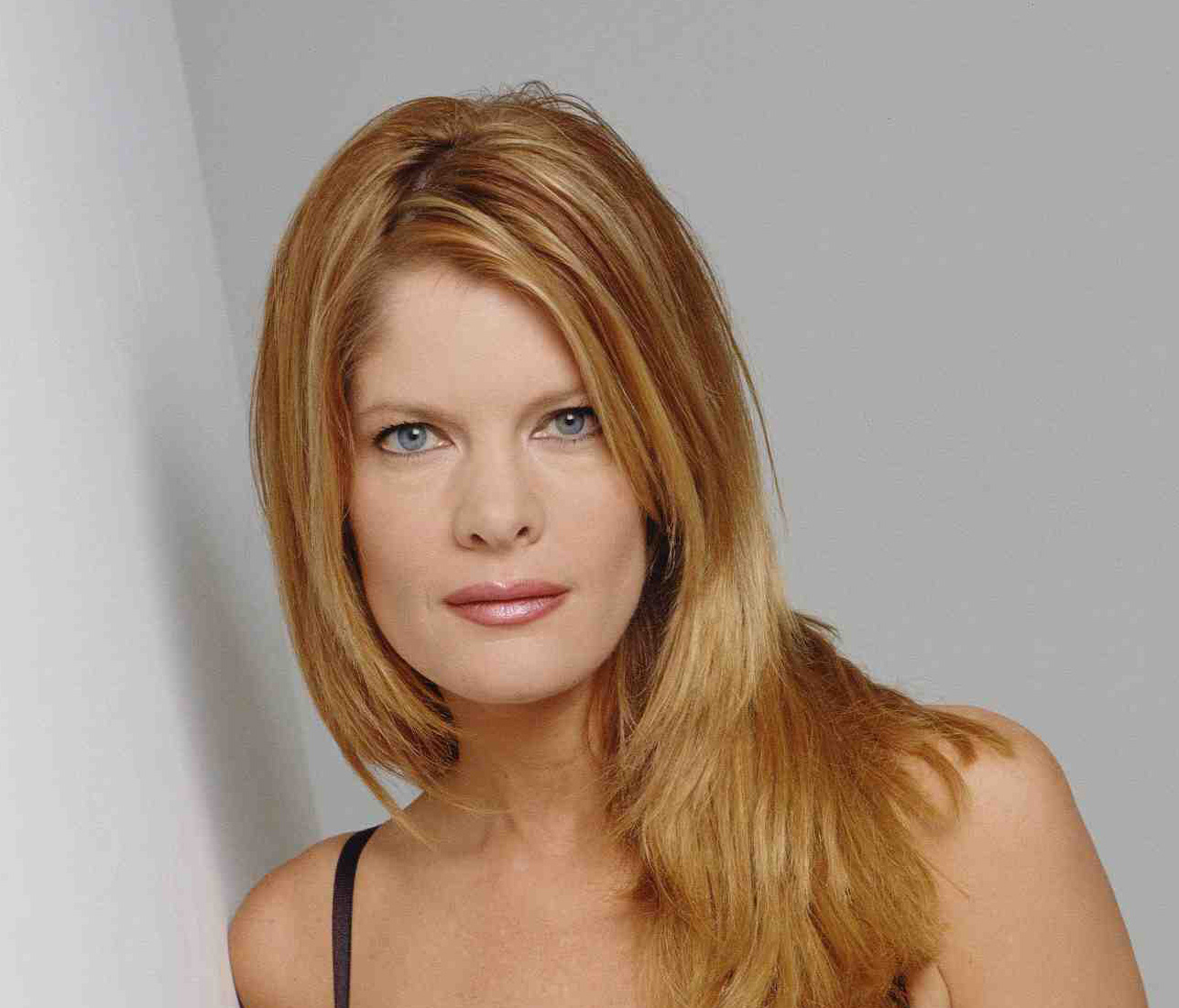
Michelle Stafford was nominated 12 times, and won in 2004 and 2024, for her role as Phyllis Summers on The Young and the Restless.

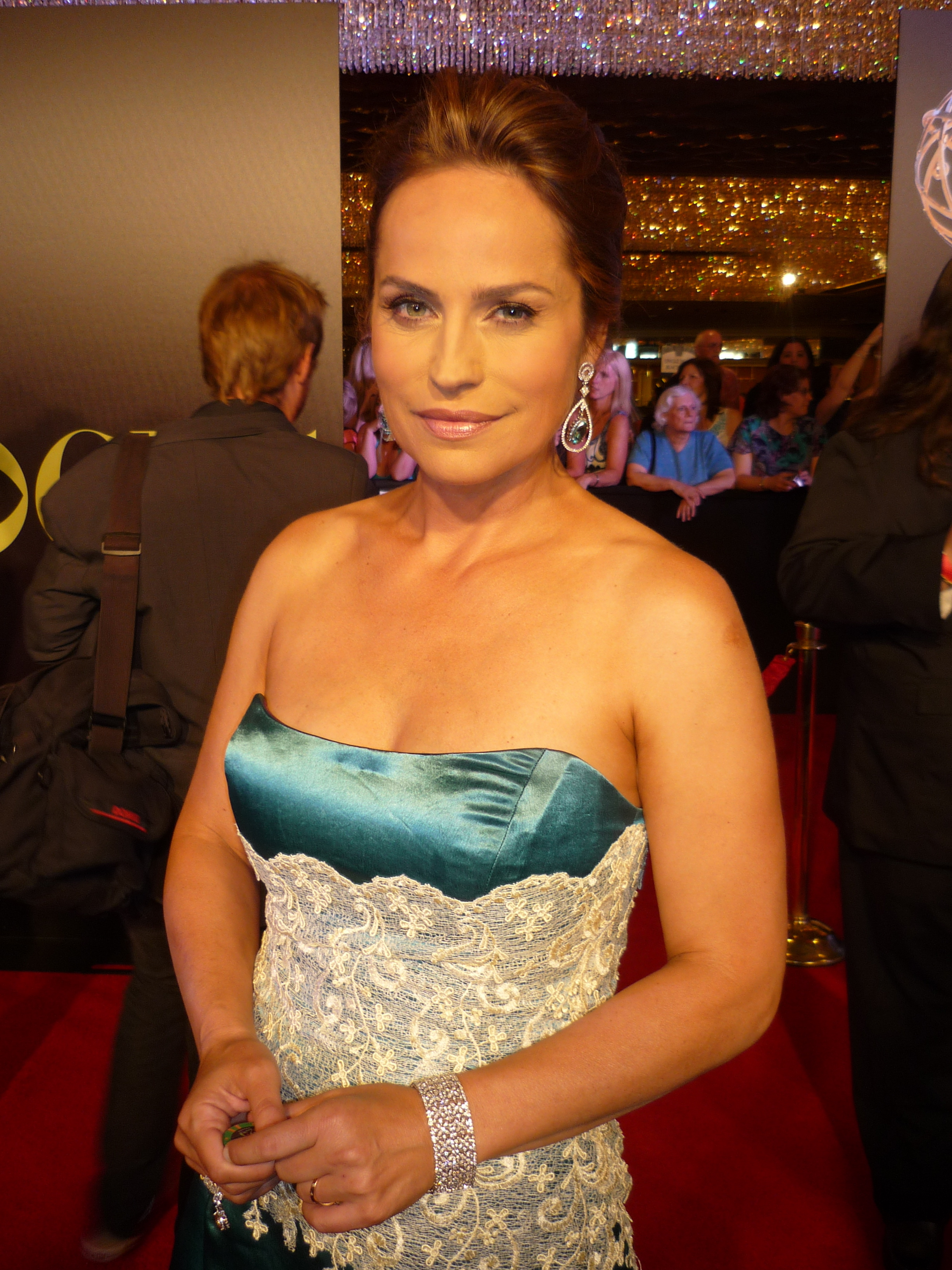
Crystal Chappell was nominated three times for her role as Olivia Spencer on Guiding Light. She was later nominated once again for her role as Carly Manning in 2012 on Days of Our Lives.

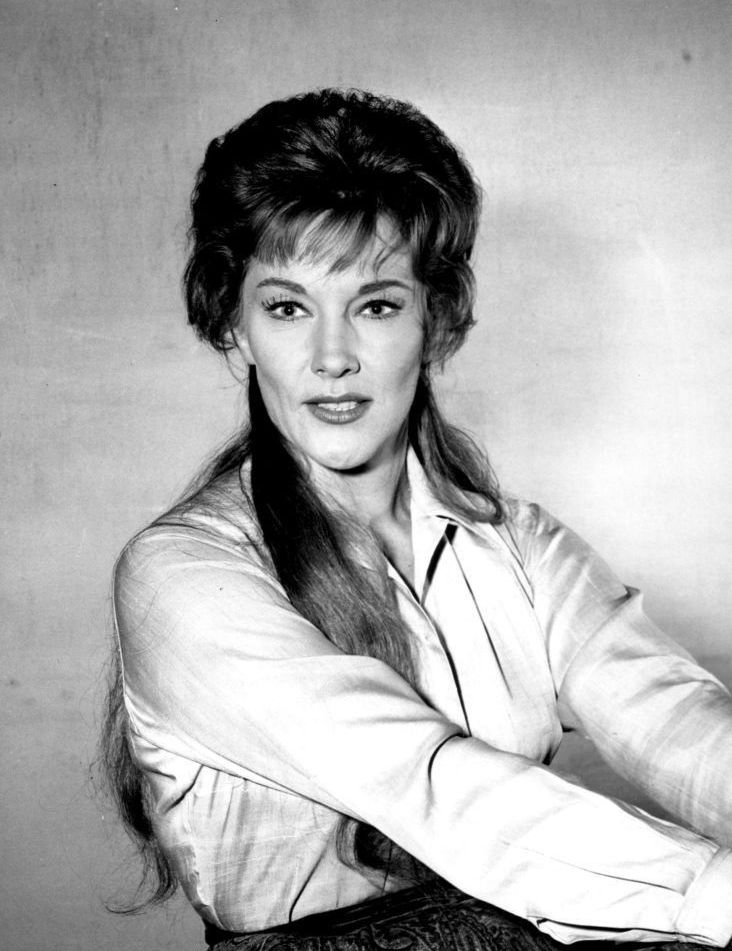
Jeanne Cooper has been nominated nine times, and won in 2008, for her role as Katherine Chancellor on The Young and the Restless.

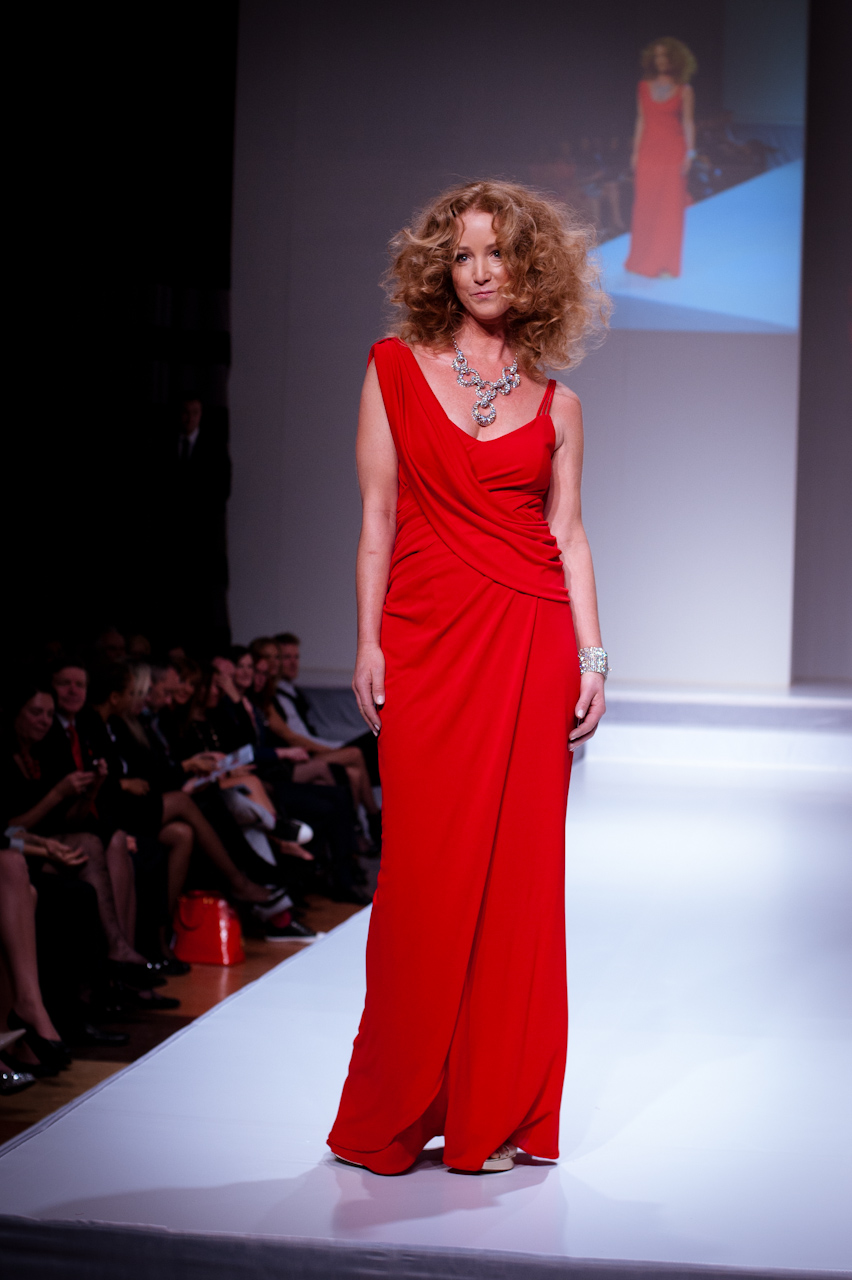
Susan Haskell won in 2009 for her role as Marty Saybrooke on One Life to Live.

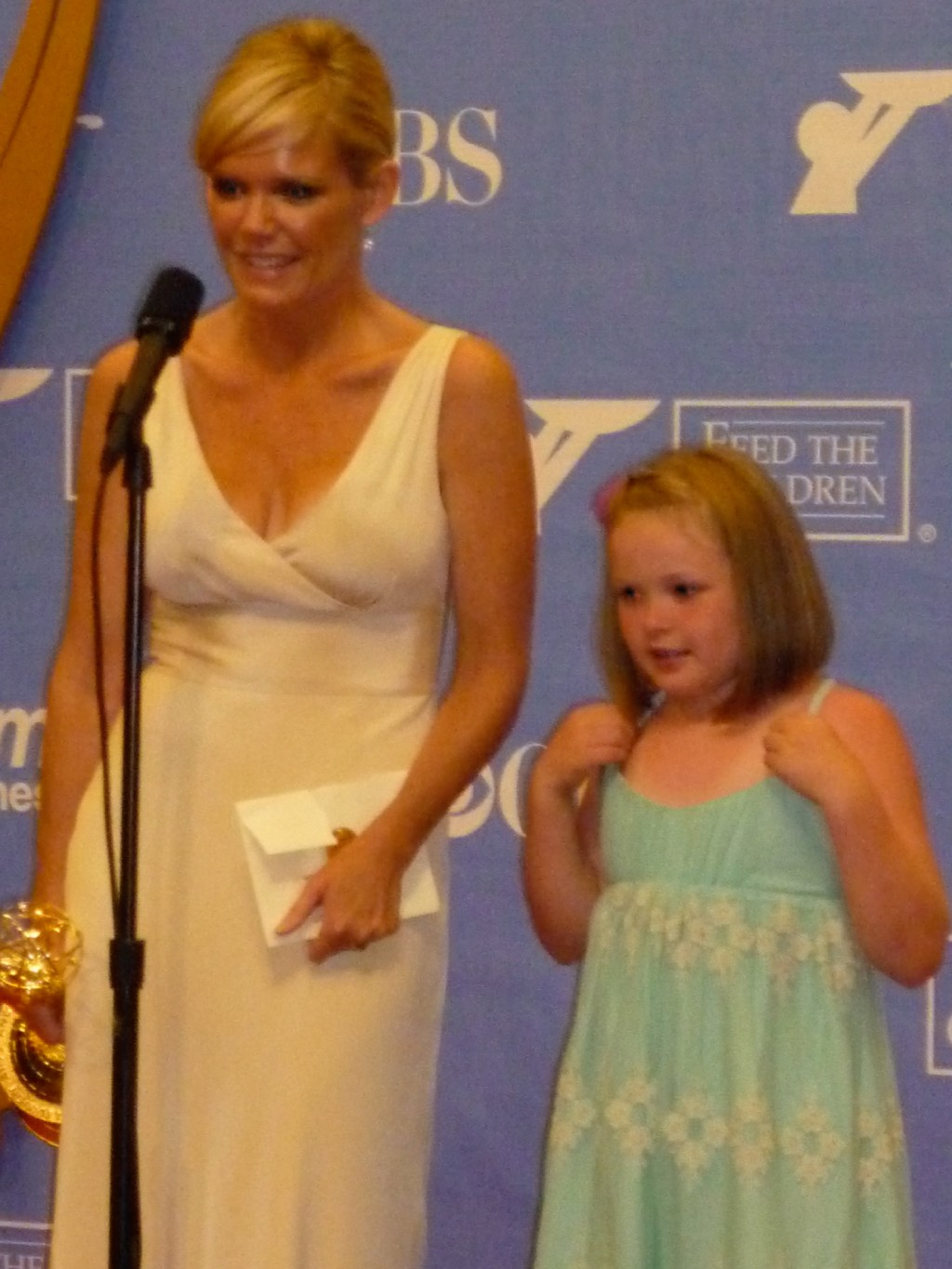
Maura West (left) won twice, from five nominations, for her role as Carly Tenney on As the World Turns. She was nominated five times, and won in 2015, for her role as Ava Jerome on General Hospital

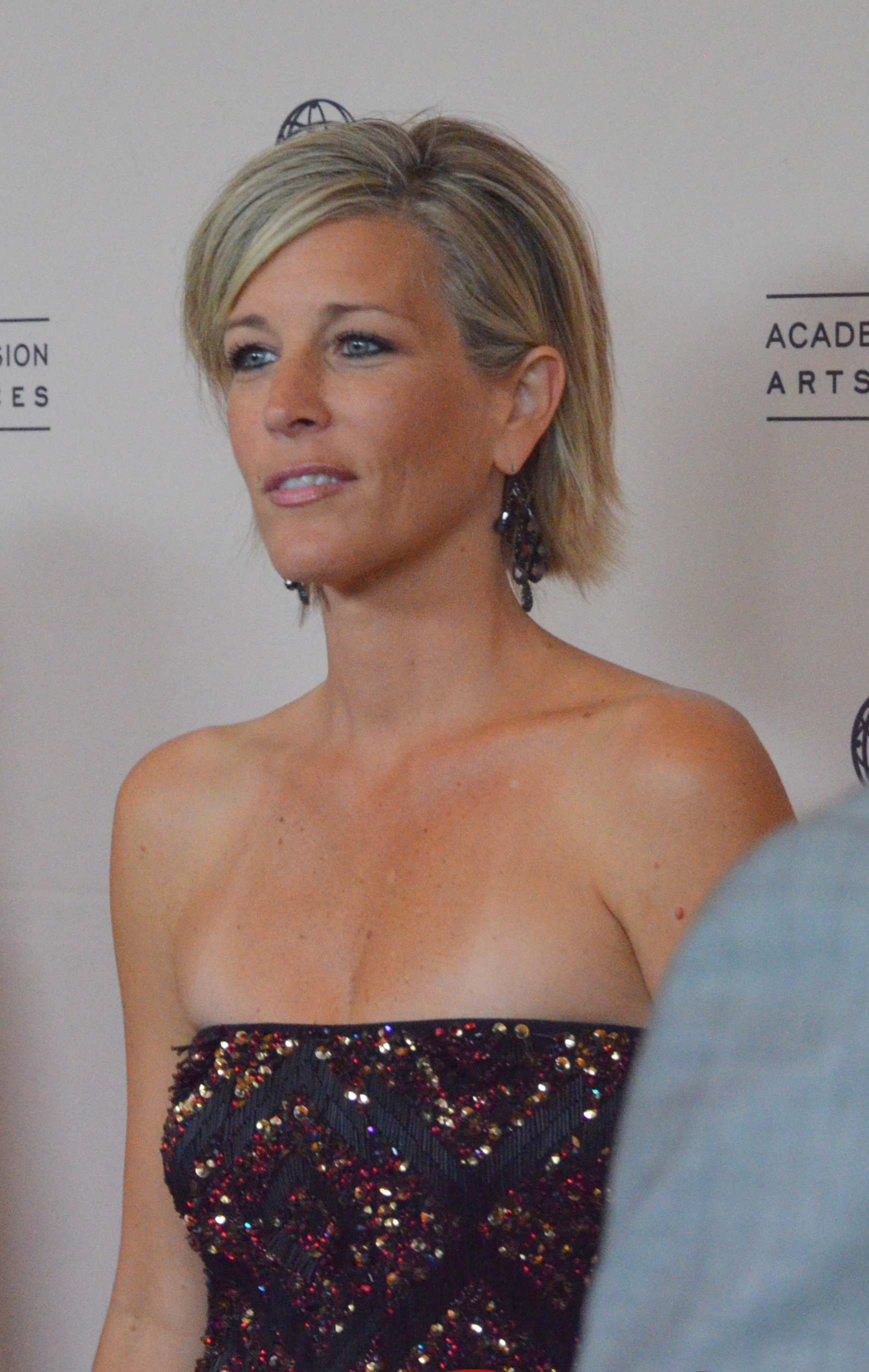
Laura Wright won once in 2011, and has been nominated a total of six times, for her role as Carly Corinthos Jacks on General Hospital.

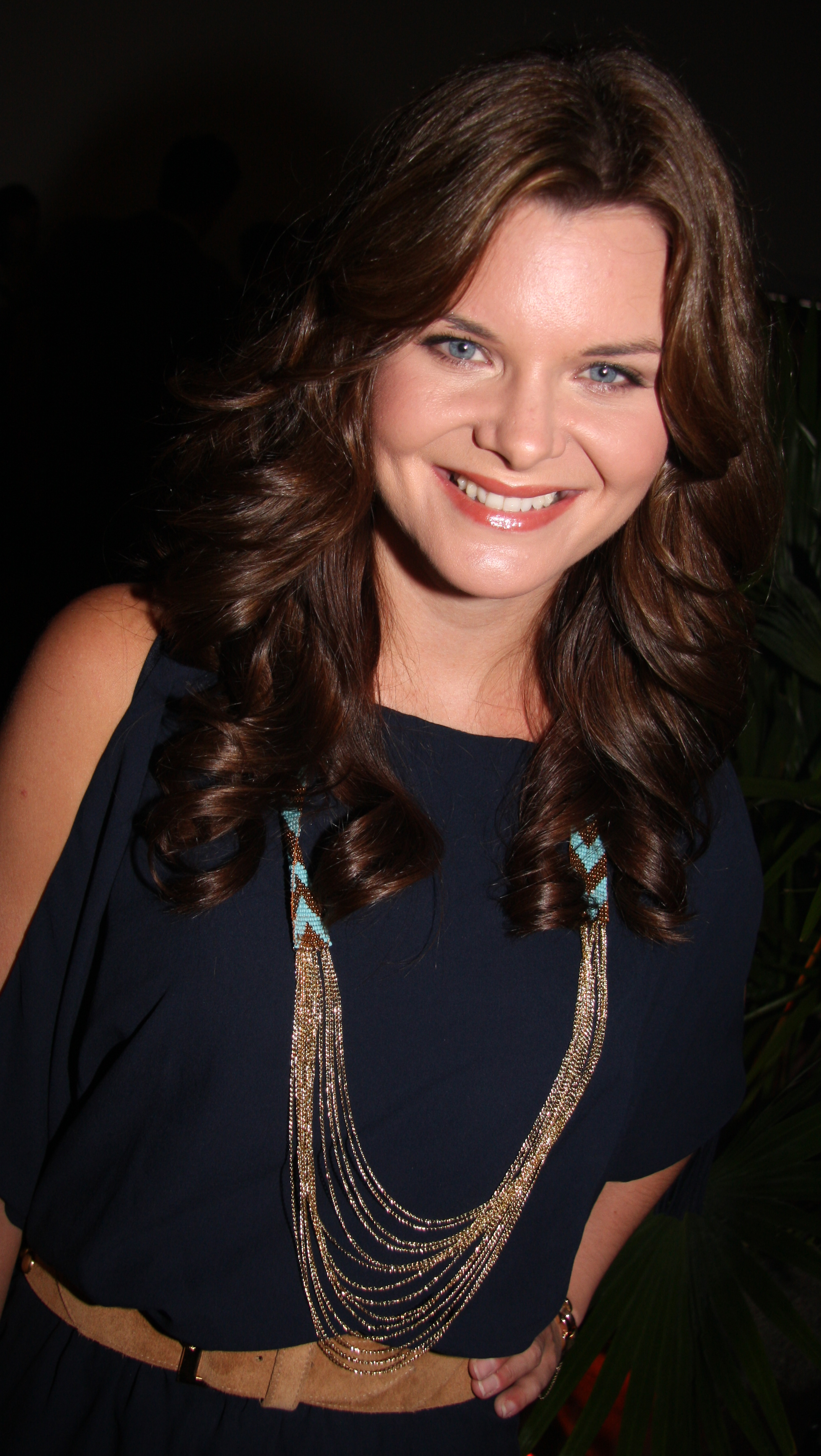
Heather Tom won three (2012, 2013, and 2020) out of her five nominations for her role as Katie Logan on The Bold and the Beautiful.

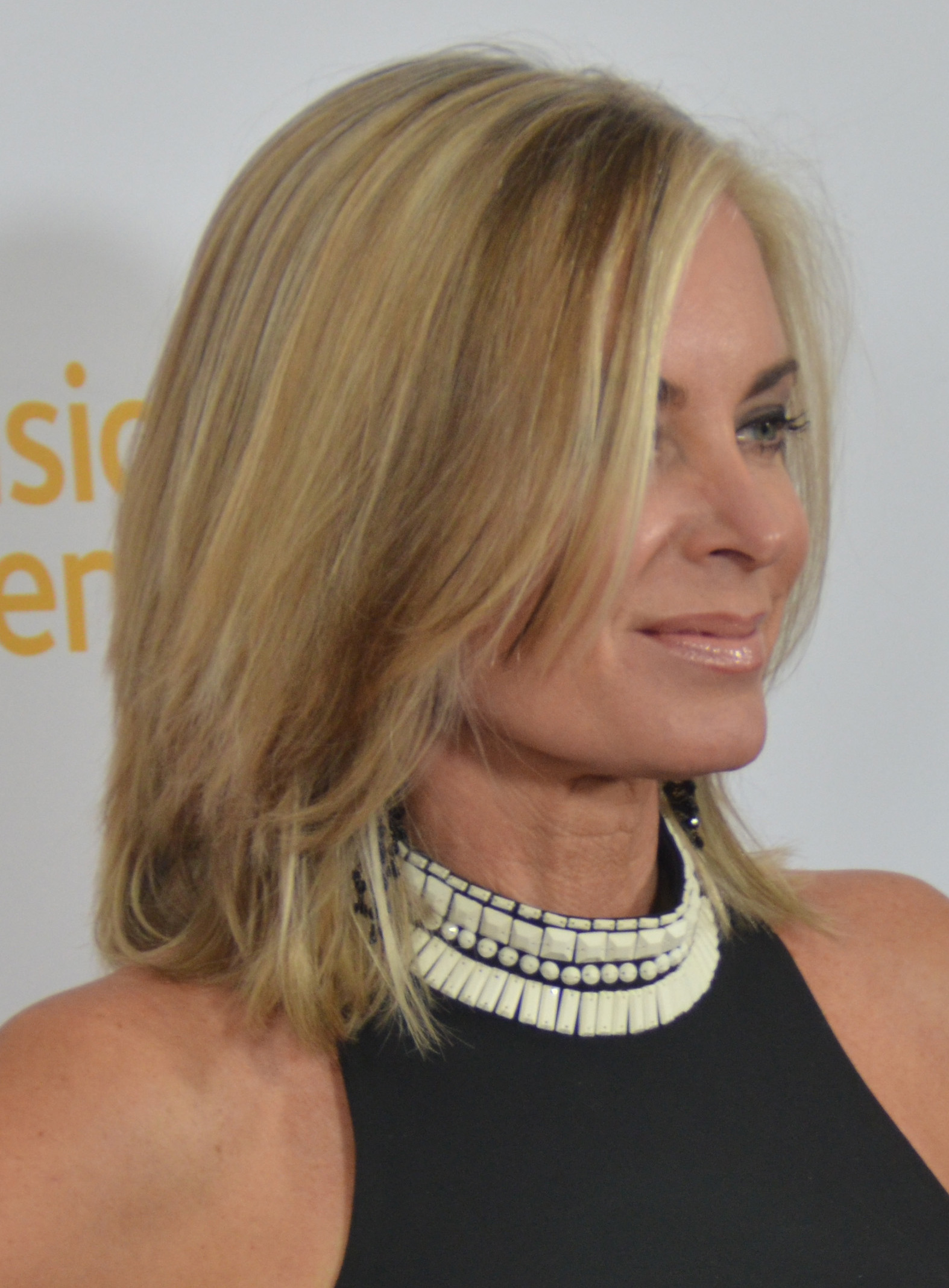
Eileen Davidson was nominated in 1998, and won in 2014, for her role on Days of Our Lives. She was also nominated in 2003, and won in 2018, for her role on The Young and the Restless.

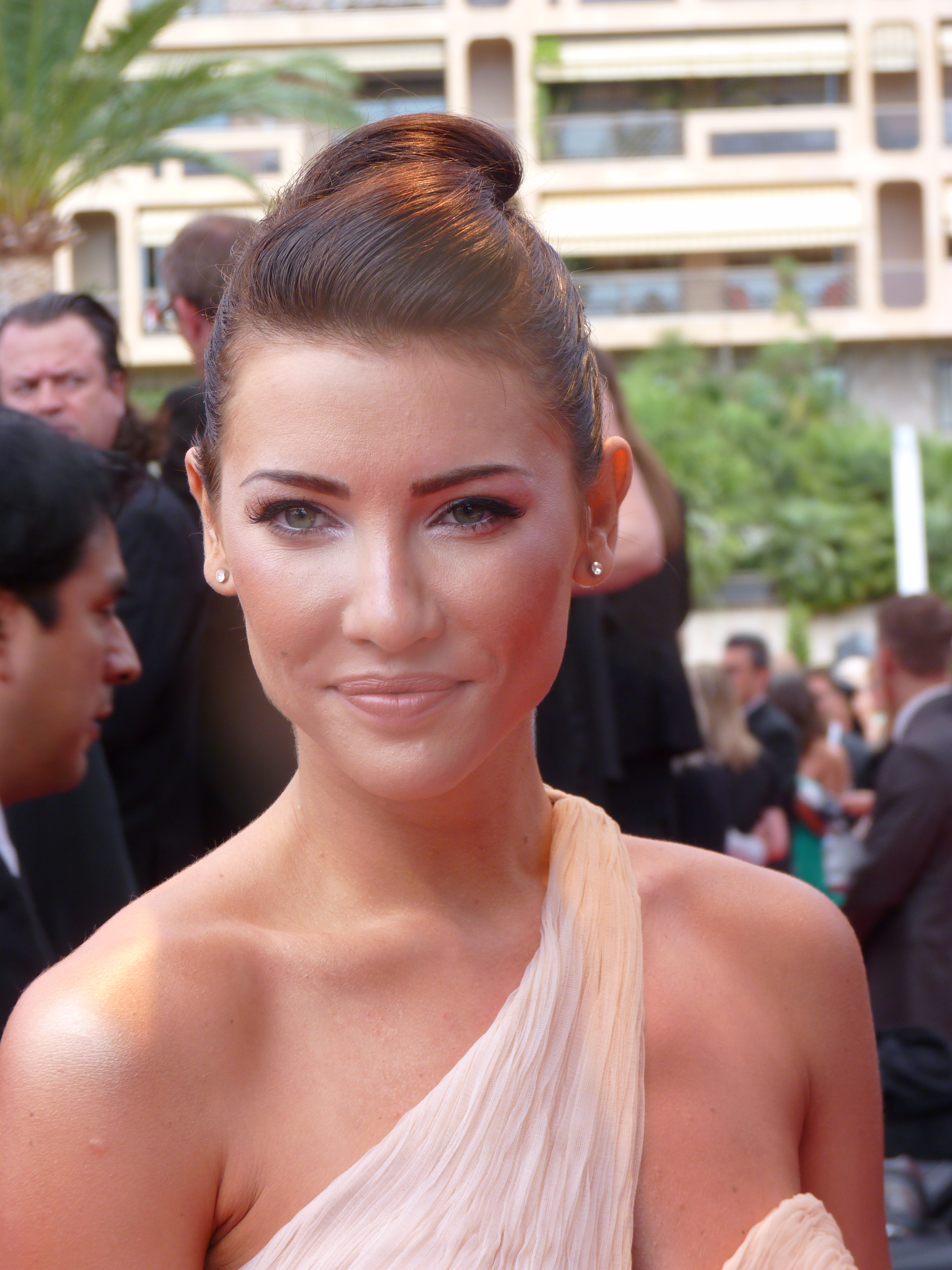
Jacqueline MacInnes Wood won in 2019, 2021 and 2023 for her role as Steffy Forrester on The Bold and the Beautiful.

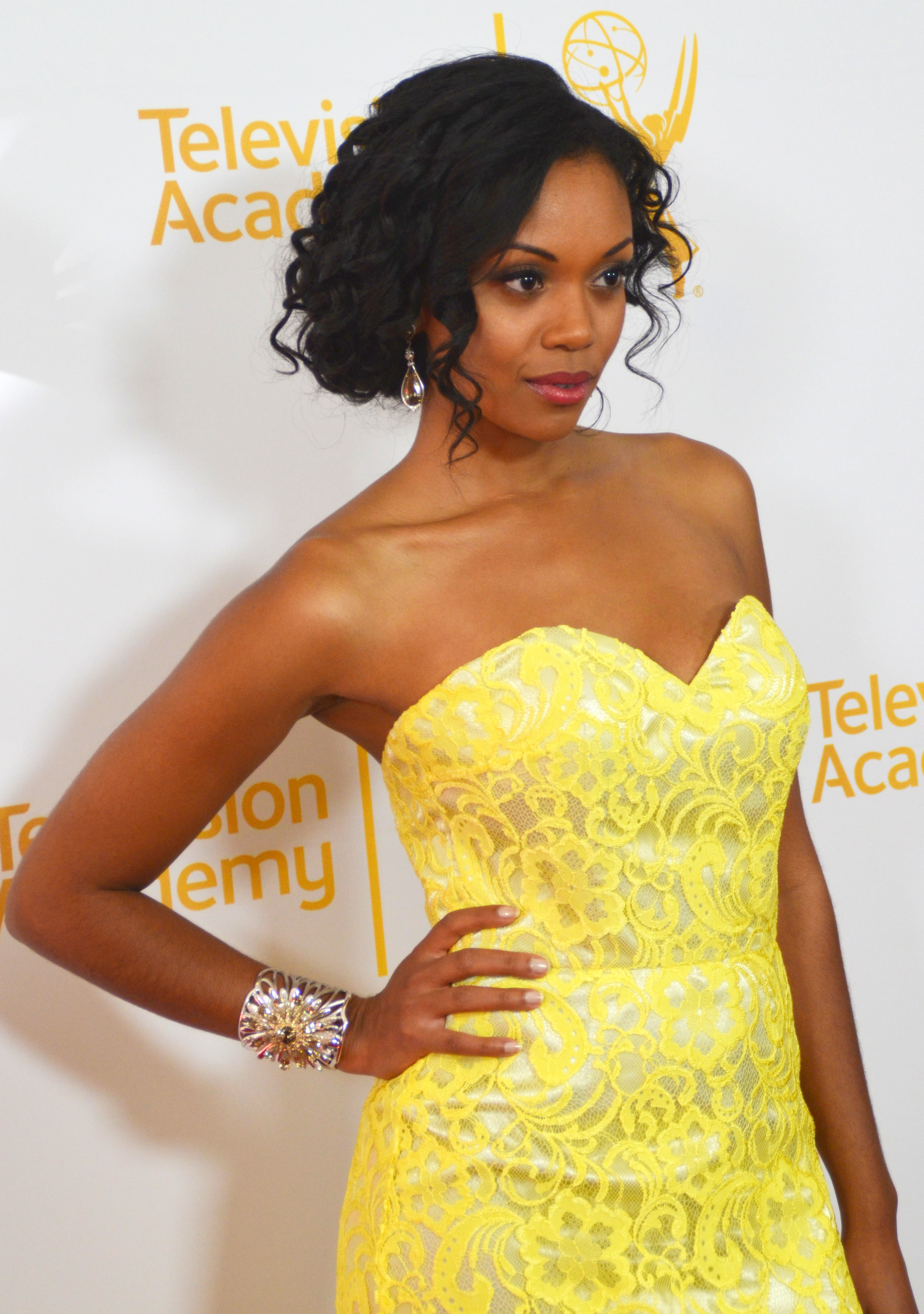
Mishael Morgan won in 2022 for her role as Amanda Sinclair on The Young and the Restless, becoming the first Black Woman to win in the category.

=== 1970s ===
Year	Actress	Program	Role	Network	Ref.
1974 (1st)	Elizabeth Hubbard ‡	The Doctors	Althea Davis	NBC	
1974 (1st)	Rachel Ames	General Hospital	Audrey Hardy	ABC	
1974 (1st)	Mary Fickett	All My Children	Ruth Martin	ABC	
1974 (1st)	Mary Stuart	Search for Tomorrow	Joanne Vincente	CBS	
1975 (2nd)	Susan Flannery ‡	Days of Our Lives	Laura Horton	NBC	
1975 (2nd)	Rachel Ames	General Hospital	Audrey Hardy	ABC	
1975 (2nd)	Susan Seaforth Hayes	Days of Our Lives	Julie Banning	NBC	
1975 (2nd)	Ruth Warrick	All My Children	Phoebe Tyler	ABC	
1976 (3rd)	Helen Gallagher ‡	Ryan's Hope	Maeve Ryan	ABC	
1976 (3rd)	Denise Alexander	General Hospital	Dr. Lesley Williams	ABC	
1976 (3rd)	Susan Seaforth Hayes	Days of Our Lives	Julie Anderson	NBC	
1976 (3rd)	Frances Heflin	All My Children	Mona Kane	ABC	
1976 (3rd)	Mary Stuart	Search for Tomorrow	Joanne Vincente	CBS	
1977 (4th)	Helen Gallagher ‡	Ryan's Hope	Maeve Ryan	ABC	
1977 (4th)	Nancy Addison	Ryan's Hope	Jillian Coleridge	ABC	
1977 (4th)	Beverlee McKinsey	Another World	Iris Carrington	NBC	
1977 (4th)	Mary Stuart	Search for Tomorrow	Joanne Vincente	CBS	
1977 (4th)	Ruth Warrick	All My Children	Phoebe Tyler	ABC	
1978 (5th)	Laurie Heineman ‡	Another World	Sharlene Frame	NBC	
1978 (5th)	Mary Fickett	All My Children	Ruth Martin	ABC	
1978 (5th)	Jennifer Harmon	One Life to Live	Cathy Craig	ABC	
1978 (5th)	Susan Seaforth Hayes	Days of Our Lives	Julie Williams	NBC	
1978 (5th)	Susan Lucci	All My Children	Erica Kane	ABC	
1978 (5th)	Beverlee McKinsey	Another World	Iris Bancroft	NBC	
1978 (5th)	Victoria Wyndham	Another World	Rachel Cory	NBC	
1979 (6th)	Irene Dailey ‡	Another World	Liz Matthews	NBC	
1979 (6th)	Nancy Addison	Ryan's Hope	Jill Coleridge	ABC	
1979 (6th)	Helen Gallagher	Ryan's Hope	Maeve Ryan	ABC	
1979 (6th)	Susan Seaforth Hayes	Days of Our Lives	Julie Williams	NBC	
1979 (6th)	Beverlee McKinsey	Another World	Iris Bancroft	NBC	
1979 (6th)	Victoria Wyndham	Another World	Rachel Cory	NBC	

=== 1980s ===
Year	Actress	Program	Role	Network	Ref.
1980 (7th)	Judith Light ‡	One Life to Live	Karen Wolek	ABC	
1980 (7th)	Julia Barr	All My Children	Brooke English	ABC	
1980 (7th)	Leslie Charleson	General Hospital	Monica Quartermaine	ABC	
1980 (7th)	Kim Hunter	The Edge of Night	Nola Madison	ABC	
1980 (7th)	Beverlee McKinsey	Another World	Iris Bancroft	NBC	
1980 (7th)	Kathleen Noone	All My Children	Ellen Dalton	ABC	
1981 (8th)	Judith Light ‡	One Life to Live	Karen Wolek	ABC	
1981 (8th)	Julia Barr	All My Children	Brooke English	ABC	
1981 (8th)	Helen Gallagher	Ryan's Hope	Maeve Ryan	ABC	
1981 (8th)	Susan Lucci	All My Children	Erica Kane	ABC	
1981 (8th)	Robin Strasser	One Life to Live	Dorian Cramer Lord	ABC	
1982 (9th)	Robin Strasser ‡	One Life to Live	Dorian Lord Callison	ABC	
1982 (9th)	Leslie Charleson	General Hospital	Monica Quartermaine	ABC	
1982 (9th)	Ann Flood	The Edge of Night	Nancy Pollock	ABC	
1982 (9th)	Sharon Gabet	The Edge of Night	Raven Whitney	ABC	
1982 (9th)	Susan Lucci	All My Children	Erica Kane	ABC	
1983 (10th)	Dorothy Lyman ‡	All My Children	Opal Gardner	ABC	
1983 (10th)	Leslie Charleson	General Hospital	Monica Quartermaine	ABC	
1983 (10th)	Susan Lucci	All My Children	Erica Kane	ABC	
1983 (10th)	Erika Slezak	One Life to Live	Victoria Lord Riley	ABC	
1983 (10th)	Robin Strasser	One Life to Live	Dorian Cramer Lord	ABC	
1984 (11th)	Erika Slezak ‡	One Life to Live	Victoria Lord Buchanan	ABC	
1984 (11th)	Ann Flood	The Edge of Night	Nancy Pollock	ABC	
1984 (11th)	Sharon Gabet	The Edge of Night	Raven Whitney	ABC	
1984 (11th)	Deidre Hall	Days of Our Lives	Marlena Evans	NBC	
1984 (11th)	Susan Lucci	All My Children	Erica Kane	ABC	
1985 (12th)	Kim Zimmer ‡	Guiding Light	Reva Shayne	CBS	
1985 (12th)	Deidre Hall	Days of Our Lives	Marlena Evans	NBC	
1985 (12th)	Susan Lucci	All My Children	Erica Kane	ABC	
1985 (12th)	Gillian Spencer	All My Children	Daisy Cortlandt	ABC	
1985 (12th)	Robin Strasser	One Life to Live	Dorian Cramer Lord	ABC	
1986 (13th)	Erika Slezak ‡	One Life to Live	Victoria Lord Buchanan	ABC	
1986 (13th)	Elizabeth Hubbard	As the World Turns	Lucinda Walsh	CBS	
1986 (13th)	Susan Lucci	All My Children	Erica Kane	ABC	
1986 (13th)	Peggy McCay	Days of Our Lives	Caroline Brady	NBC	
1986 (13th)	Kim Zimmer	Guiding Light	Reva Shayne	CBS	
1987 (14th)	Kim Zimmer ‡	Guiding Light	Reva Shayne	CBS	
1987 (14th)	Elizabeth Hubbard	As the World Turns	Lucinda Walsh	CBS	
1987 (14th)	Susan Lucci	All My Children	Erica Kane	ABC	
1987 (14th)	Frances Reid	Days of Our Lives	Alice Horton	NBC	
1987 (14th)	Marcy Walker	Santa Barbara	Eden Capwell	NBC	
1988 (15th)	Helen Gallagher ‡	Ryan's Hope	Maeve Ryan	ABC	
1988 (15th)	Elizabeth Hubbard	As the World Turns	Lucinda Walsh	CBS	
1988 (15th)	Susan Lucci	All My Children	Erica Kane	ABC	
1988 (15th)	Erika Slezak	One Life to Live	Victoria Lord Buchanan	ABC	
1988 (15th)	Marcy Walker	Santa Barbara	Eden Capwell	NBC	
1989 (16th)	Marcy Walker ‡	Santa Barbara	Eden Capwell	NBC	
1989 (16th)	Jeanne Cooper	The Young and the Restless	Katherine Chancellor	CBS	
1989 (16th)	Elizabeth Hubbard	As the World Turns	Lucinda Walsh	CBS	
1989 (16th)	Susan Lucci	All My Children	Erica Kane	ABC	

=== 1990s ===
Year	Actress	Program	Role	Network	Ref.
1990 (17th)	Kim Zimmer	Guiding Light	Reva Shayne	CBS	
1990 (17th)	Jeanne Cooper	The Young and the Restless	Katherine Chancellor	CBS	
1990 (17th)	Elizabeth Hubbard	As the World Turns	Lucinda Walsh	CBS	
1990 (17th)	Finola Hughes	General Hospital	Anna Devane	ABC	
1990 (17th)	Susan Lucci	All My Children	Erica Kane	ABC	
1991 (18th)	Finola Hughes	General Hospital	Anna Devane	ABC	
1991 (18th)	Julia Barr	All My Children	Brooke English	ABC	
1991 (18th)	Jeanne Cooper	The Young and the Restless	Katherine Chancellor	CBS	
1991 (18th)	Elizabeth Hubbard	As the World Turns	Lucinda Walsh	CBS	
1991 (18th)	Susan Lucci	All My Children	Erica Kane	ABC	
1992 (19th)	Erika Slezak	One Life to Live	Victoria Lord Buchanan	ABC	
1992 (19th)	Jeanne Cooper	The Young and the Restless	Katherine Chancellor	CBS	
1992 (19th)	Elizabeth Hubbard	As the World Turns	Lucinda Walsh	CBS	
1992 (19th)	Susan Lucci	All My Children	Erica Kane	ABC	
1992 (19th)	Jessica Tuck	One Life to Live	Megan Gordon Harrison	ABC	
1993 (20th)	Linda Dano	Another World	Felicia Gallant	NBC	
1993 (20th)	Julia Barr	All My Children	Brooke English	ABC	
1993 (20th)	Ellen Dolan	As the World Turns	Margo Hughes	CBS	
1993 (20th)	Maeve Kinkead	Guiding Light	Vanessa Chamberlain	CBS	
1993 (20th)	Susan Lucci	All My Children	Erica Kane	ABC	
1994 (21st)	Hillary B. Smith	One Life to Live	Nora Hanen Gannon	ABC	
1994 (21st)	Julia Barr	All My Children	Brooke English	ABC	
1994 (21st)	Linda Dano	Another World	Felicia Gallant	NBC	
1994 (21st)	Fiona Hutchison	Guiding Light	Jenna Bradshaw	CBS	
1994 (21st)	Kathleen Widdoes	As the World Turns	Emma Snyder	CBS	
1995 (22nd)	Erika Slezak ‡	One Life to Live	Victoria Lord Carpenter	ABC	
1995 (22nd)	Leslie Charleson	General Hospital	Monica Quartermaine	ABC	
1995 (22nd)	Marj Dusay	Guiding Light	Alexandra Spaulding	CBS	
1995 (22nd)	Maeve Kinkead	Guiding Light	Vanessa Chamberlain	CBS	
1995 (22nd)	Susan Lucci	All My Children	Erica Kane	ABC	
1996 (23rd)	Erika Slezak ‡	One Life to Live	Victoria Lord Carpenter	ABC	
1996 (23rd)	Jensen Buchanan	Another World	Vicky Hudson	NBC	
1996 (23rd)	Linda Dano	Another World	Felicia Gallant	NBC	
1996 (23rd)	Susan Lucci	All My Children	Erica Kane	ABC	
1996 (23rd)	Jess Walton	The Young and the Restless	Jill Abbott	CBS	
1997 (24th)	Jess Walton ‡	The Young and the Restless	Jill Abbott	CBS	
1997 (24th)	Jensen Buchanan	Another World	Vicky Hudson	NBC	
1997 (24th)	Genie Francis	General Hospital	Laura Spencer	ABC	
1997 (24th)	Susan Lucci	All My Children	Erica Kane	ABC	
1998 (25th)	Cynthia Watros ‡	Guiding Light	Annie Dutton	CBS	
1998 (25th)	Eileen Davidson	Days of Our Lives	Kristen Blake	NBC	
1998 (25th)	Susan Lucci	All My Children	Erica Kane	ABC	
1998 (25th)	Jacklyn Zeman	General Hospital	Bobbie Spencer	ABC	
1998 (25th)	Kim Zimmer	Guiding Light	Reva Shayne	CBS	
1999 (26th)	Susan Lucci ‡	All My Children	Erica Kane	ABC	
1999 (26th)	Jeanne Cooper	The Young and the Restless	Katherine Chancellor	CBS	
1999 (26th)	Elizabeth Hubbard	As the World Turns	Lucinda Walsh	CBS	
1999 (26th)	Melody Thomas Scott	The Young and the Restless	Nikki Newman	CBS	
1999 (26th)	Kim Zimmer	Guiding Light	Reva Shayne	CBS	

=== 2000s ===
Year	Actress	Program	Role	Network	Ref.
2000 (27th)	Susan Flannery ‡	The Bold and the Beautiful	Stephanie Forrester	CBS	
2000 (27th)	Jeanne Cooper	The Young and the Restless	Katherine Chancellor	CBS	
2000 (27th)	Finola Hughes	All My Children	Alex Devane	ABC	
2000 (27th)	Hillary B. Smith	One Life to Live	Nora Hanen	ABC	
2000 (27th)	Jess Walton	The Young and the Restless	Jill Abbott	CBS	
2001 (28th)	Martha Byrne ‡	As the World Turns	Lily Walsh Snyder / Rose D'Angelo	CBS	
2001 (28th)	Julia Barr	All My Children	Brooke English	ABC	
2001 (28th)	Susan Flannery	The Bold and the Beautiful	Stephanie Forrester	CBS	
2001 (28th)	Susan Lucci	All My Children	Erica Kane	ABC	
2001 (28th)	Marcy Walker	All My Children	Liza Colby	ABC	
2002 (29th)	Susan Flannery ‡	The Bold and the Beautiful	Stephanie Forrester	CBS	
2002 (29th)	Martha Byrne	As the World Turns	Lily Walsh Snyder / Rose D'Angelo	CBS	
2002 (29th)	Finola Hughes	All My Children	Alex Devane / Anna Devane	ABC	
2002 (29th)	Susan Lucci	All My Children	Erica Kane	ABC	
2002 (29th)	Colleen Zenk Pinter	As the World Turns	Barbara Ryan	CBS	
2003 (30th)	Susan Flannery ‡	The Bold and the Beautiful	Stephanie Forrester	CBS	
2003 (30th)	Eileen Davidson	The Young and the Restless	Ashley Abbott	CBS	
2003 (30th)	Nancy Lee Grahn	General Hospital	Alexis Davis	ABC	
2003 (30th)	Michelle Stafford	The Young and the Restless	Phyllis Summers Abbott	CBS	
2003 (30th)	Kim Zimmer	Guiding Light	Reva Shayne Lewis	CBS	
2004 (31st)	Michelle Stafford ‡	The Young and the Restless	Phyllis Summers Abbott	CBS	
2004 (31st)	Tamara Braun	General Hospital	Carly Corinthos	ABC	
2004 (31st)	Nancy Lee Grahn	General Hospital	Alexis Davis	ABC	
2004 (31st)	Maura West	As the World Turns	Carly Snyder	CBS	
2004 (31st)	Kim Zimmer	Guiding Light	Reva Shayne Lewis	CBS	
2005 (32nd)	Erika Slezak ‡	One Life to Live	Victoria Lord Davidson	ABC	
2005 (32nd)	Martha Byrne	As the World Turns	Lily Walsh Snyder	CBS	
2005 (32nd)	Kassie DePaiva	One Life to Live	Blair Cramer	ABC	
2005 (32nd)	Susan Flannery	The Bold and the Beautiful	Stephanie Forrester	CBS	
2005 (32nd)	Nancy Lee Grahn	General Hospital	Alexis Davis	ABC	
2005 (32nd)	Juliet Mills	Passions	Tabitha Lenox	NBC	
2005 (32nd)	Michelle Stafford	The Young and the Restless	Phyllis Summers Abbott	CBS	
2005 (32nd)	Kim Zimmer	Guiding Light	Reva Shayne Lewis	CBS	
2006 (33rd)	Kim Zimmer ‡	Guiding Light	Reva Shayne Lewis	CBS	
2006 (33rd)	Bobbie Eakes	All My Children	Krystal Carey	ABC	
2006 (33rd)	Beth Ehlers	Guiding Light	Harley Cooper	CBS	
2006 (33rd)	Susan Flannery	The Bold and the Beautiful	Stephanie Forrester	CBS	
2006 (33rd)	Kelly Monaco	General Hospital	Sam McCall	ABC	
2007 (34th)	Maura West ‡	As the World Turns	Carly Snyder	CBS	
2007 (34th)	Crystal Chappell	Guiding Light	Olivia Spencer	CBS	
2007 (34th)	Jeanne Cooper	The Young and the Restless	Katherine Chancellor	CBS	
2007 (34th)	Michelle Stafford	The Young and the Restless	Phyllis Summers Newman	CBS	
2007 (34th)	Kim Zimmer	Guiding Light	Reva Shayne Lewis	CBS	
2008 (35th)	Jeanne Cooper ‡	The Young and the Restless	Katherine Chancellor	CBS	
2008 (35th)	Crystal Chappell	Guiding Light	Olivia Spencer	CBS	
2008 (35th)	Nicole Forester	Guiding Light	Cassie Layne Winslow	CBS	
2008 (35th)	Michelle Stafford	The Young and the Restless	Phyllis Summers Newman	CBS	
2008 (35th)	Maura West	As the World Turns	Carly Tenney	CBS	
2009 (36th)	Susan Haskell ‡	One Life to Live	Dr. Marty Saybrooke	ABC	
2009 (36th)	Jeanne Cooper	The Young and the Restless	Katherine Chancellor	CBS	
2009 (36th)	Susan Flannery	The Bold and the Beautiful	Stephanie Forrester	CBS	
2009 (36th)	Debbi Morgan	All My Children	Angie Hubbard	ABC	
2009 (36th)	Maura West	As the World Turns	Carly Tenney	CBS	

=== 2010s ===
Year	Actress	Program	Role	Network	Ref.
2010 (37th)	Maura West ‡	As the World Turns	Carly Tenney	CBS	
2010 (37th)	Sarah Brown	General Hospital	Claudia Zacchara Corinthos	ABC	
2010 (37th)	Crystal Chappell	Guiding Light	Olivia Spencer	CBS	
2010 (37th)	Bobbie Eakes	All My Children	Krystal Carey	ABC	
2010 (37th)	Michelle Stafford	The Young and the Restless	Phyllis Summers Newman	CBS	
2011 (38th)	Laura Wright ‡	General Hospital	Carly Corinthos Jacks	ABC	
2011 (38th)	Susan Flannery	The Bold and the Beautiful	Stephanie Forrester	CBS	
2011 (38th)	Alicia Minshew	All My Children	Kendall Slater	ABC	
2011 (38th)	Debbi Morgan	All My Children	Angie Hubbard	ABC	
2011 (38th)	Michelle Stafford	The Young and the Restless	Phyllis Summers Newman	CBS	
2011 (38th)	Colleen Zenk	As the World Turns	Barbara Ryan	CBS	
2012 (39th)	Heather Tom ‡	The Bold and the Beautiful	Katie Logan Spencer	CBS	
2012 (39th)	Crystal Chappell	Days of Our Lives	Dr. Carly Manning	NBC	
2012 (39th)	Debbi Morgan	All My Children	Angie Hubbard	ABC	
2012 (39th)	Erika Slezak	One Life to Live	Victoria Lord	ABC	
2012 (39th)	Laura Wright	General Hospital	Carly Corinthos Jacks	ABC	
2013 (40th)	Heather Tom ‡	The Bold and the Beautiful	Katie Logan Spencer	CBS	
2013 (40th)	Susan Flannery	The Bold and the Beautiful	Stephanie Forrester	CBS	
2013 (40th)	Peggy McCay	Days of Our Lives	Caroline Brady	NBC	
2013 (40th)	Michelle Stafford	The Young and the Restless	Phyllis Summers Newman	CBS	
2014 (41st)	Eileen Davidson ‡	Days of Our Lives	Kristen DiMera	NBC	
2014 (41st)	Katherine Kelly Lang	The Bold and the Beautiful	Brooke Logan	CBS	
2014 (41st)	Heather Tom	The Bold and the Beautiful	Katie Logan	CBS	
2014 (41st)	Arianne Zucker	Days of Our Lives	Nicole Walker	NBC	
2015 (42nd)	Maura West ‡	General Hospital	Ava Jerome	ABC	
2015 (42nd)	Peggy McCay	Days of Our Lives	Caroline Brady	NBC	
2015 (42nd)	Alison Sweeney	Days of Our Lives	Sami Brady DiMera	NBC	
2015 (42nd)	Gina Tognoni	The Young and the Restless	Phyllis Summers	CBS	
2015 (42nd)	Laura Wright	General Hospital	Carly Corinthos	ABC	
2016 (43rd)	Mary Beth Evans ‡	Days of Our Lives	Kayla Brady	NBC	
2016 (43rd)	Tracey E. Bregman	The Young and the Restless	Lauren Fenmore Baldwin	CBS	
2016 (43rd)	Kassie DePaiva	Days of Our Lives	Eve Larson	NBC	
2016 (43rd)	Finola Hughes	General Hospital	Anna Devane	ABC	
2016 (43rd)	Maura West	General Hospital	Ava Jerome	ABC	
2017 (44th)	Gina Tognoni ‡	The Young and the Restless	Phyllis Summers	CBS	
2017 (44th)	Nancy Lee Grahn	General Hospital	Alexis Davis	ABC	
2017 (44th)	Heather Tom	The Bold and the Beautiful	Katie Logan	CBS	
2017 (44th)	Jess Walton	The Young and the Restless	Jill Abbott	CBS	
2017 (44th)	Laura Wright	General Hospital	Carly Corinthos	ABC	
2018 (45th)	Eileen Davidson ‡	The Young and the Restless	Ashley Abbott	CBS	
2018 (45th)	Nancy Lee Grahn	General Hospital	Alexis Davis	ABC	
2018 (45th)	Marci Miller	Days of Our Lives	Abigail Deveraux	NBC	
2018 (45th)	Maura West	General Hospital	Ava Jerome	ABC	
2018 (45th)	Laura Wright	General Hospital	Carly Corinthos	ABC	
2019 (46th)	Jacqueline MacInnes Wood ‡	The Bold and the Beautiful	Steffy Forrester	CBS	
2019 (46th)	Marci Miller	Days of Our Lives	Abigail Deveraux	NBC	
2019 (46th)	Heather Tom	The Bold and the Beautiful	Katie Logan	CBS	
2019 (46th)	Maura West	General Hospital	Ava Jerome	ABC	
2019 (46th)	Laura Wright	General Hospital	Carly Corinthos	ABC	

=== 2020s ===
Year	Actress	Program	Role	Network	Ref.
2020 (47th)	Heather Tom ‡	The Bold and the Beautiful	Katie Logan	CBS	
2020 (47th)	Finola Hughes	General Hospital	Anna Devane / Alex Marick	ABC	
2020 (47th)	Katherine Kelly Lang	The Bold and the Beautiful	Brooke Logan	CBS	
2020 (47th)	Maura West	General Hospital	Ava Jerome	ABC	
2020 (47th)	Arianne Zucker	Days of Our Lives	Nicole Walker	NBC	
2021 (48th)	Jacqueline MacInnes Wood ‡	The Bold and the Beautiful	Steffy Forrester Finnegan	CBS	
2021 (48th)	Melissa Claire Egan	The Young and the Restless	Chelsea Lawson	CBS	
2021 (48th)	Genie Francis	General Hospital	Laura Webber Collins	ABC	
2021 (48th)	Nancy Lee Grahn	General Hospital	Alexis Davis	ABC	
2021 (48th)	Finola Hughes	General Hospital	Anna Devane / Alex Marick	ABC	
2022 (49th)
2022 (49th)	Mishael Morgan ‡	The Young and the Restless	Amanda Sinclair	CBS	
2022 (49th)	Marci Miller	Days of Our Lives	Abigail Deveraux DiMera	NBC	
2022 (49th)	Cynthia Watros	General Hospital	Nina Reeves	ABC	
2022 (49th)	Laura Wright	General Hospital	Carly Corinthos	ABC	
2022 (49th)	Arianne Zucker	Days of Our Lives	Nicole Walker	NBC	
2023 (50th)
2023 (50th)	Jacqueline MacInnes Wood ‡	The Bold and the Beautiful	Steffy Forrester Finnegan	CBS	
2023 (50th)	Sharon Case	The Young and the Restless	Sharon Newman	CBS	
2023 (50th)	Melissa Claire Egan	The Young and the Restless	Chelsea Lawson	CBS	
2023 (50th)	Finola Hughes	General Hospital	Anna Devane	ABC	
2023 (50th)	Michelle Stafford	The Young and the Restless	Phyllis Summers	CBS	
2024 (51st)
2024 (51st)	Michelle Stafford ‡	The Young and the Restless	Phyllis Summers	CBS	
2024 (51st)	Tamara Braun	Days of Our Lives	Ava Vitali	NBC	
2024 (51st)	Finola Hughes	General Hospital	Anna Devane	ABC	
2024 (51st)	Katherine Kelly Lang	The Bold and the Beautiful	Brooke Logan	CBS	
2024 (51st)	Annika Noelle	The Bold and the Beautiful	Hope Logan Spencer	CBS	
2024 (51st)	Cynthia Watros	General Hospital	Nina Reeves	ABC	
2025 (52nd)
2025 (52nd)	Nancy Lee Grahn ‡	General Hospital	Alexis Davis	ABC	
2025 (52nd)	Sharon Case	The Young and the Restless	Sharon Newman	CBS	
2025 (52nd)	Eileen Davidson	The Young and the Restless	Ashley Abbott	CBS	
2025 (52nd)	Melissa Claire Egan	The Young and the Restless	Chelsea Lawson	CBS	
2025 (52nd)	Michelle Stafford	The Young and the Restless	Phyllis Summers	CBS	
2025 (52nd)	Laura Wright	General Hospital	Carly Corinthos	ABC	
2026 (53rd)
2026 (53rd)	Tamara Tunie ‡	Beyond the Gates	Anita Williams Dupree	CBS	
2026 (53rd)	Stacy Haiduk	Days of Our Lives	Kristen DiMera	Peacock	
2026 (53rd)	Karla Mosley	Beyond the Gates	Dani Dupree	CBS	
2026 (53rd)	Michelle Stafford	The Young and the Restless	Phyllis Summers	CBS	
2026 (53rd)	Heather Tom	The Bold and the Beautiful	Katie Logan	CBS	

== Performers with multiple wins ==
The following individuals received two or more wins in this category:

6 wins

- Erika Slezak

4 wins

- Susan Flannery
- Kim Zimmer

3 wins

- Helen Gallagher
- Heather Tom
- Maura West
- Jacqueline MacInnes Wood

2 wins

- Eileen Davidson
- Judith Light
- Michelle Stafford

== Performers with multiple nominations ==
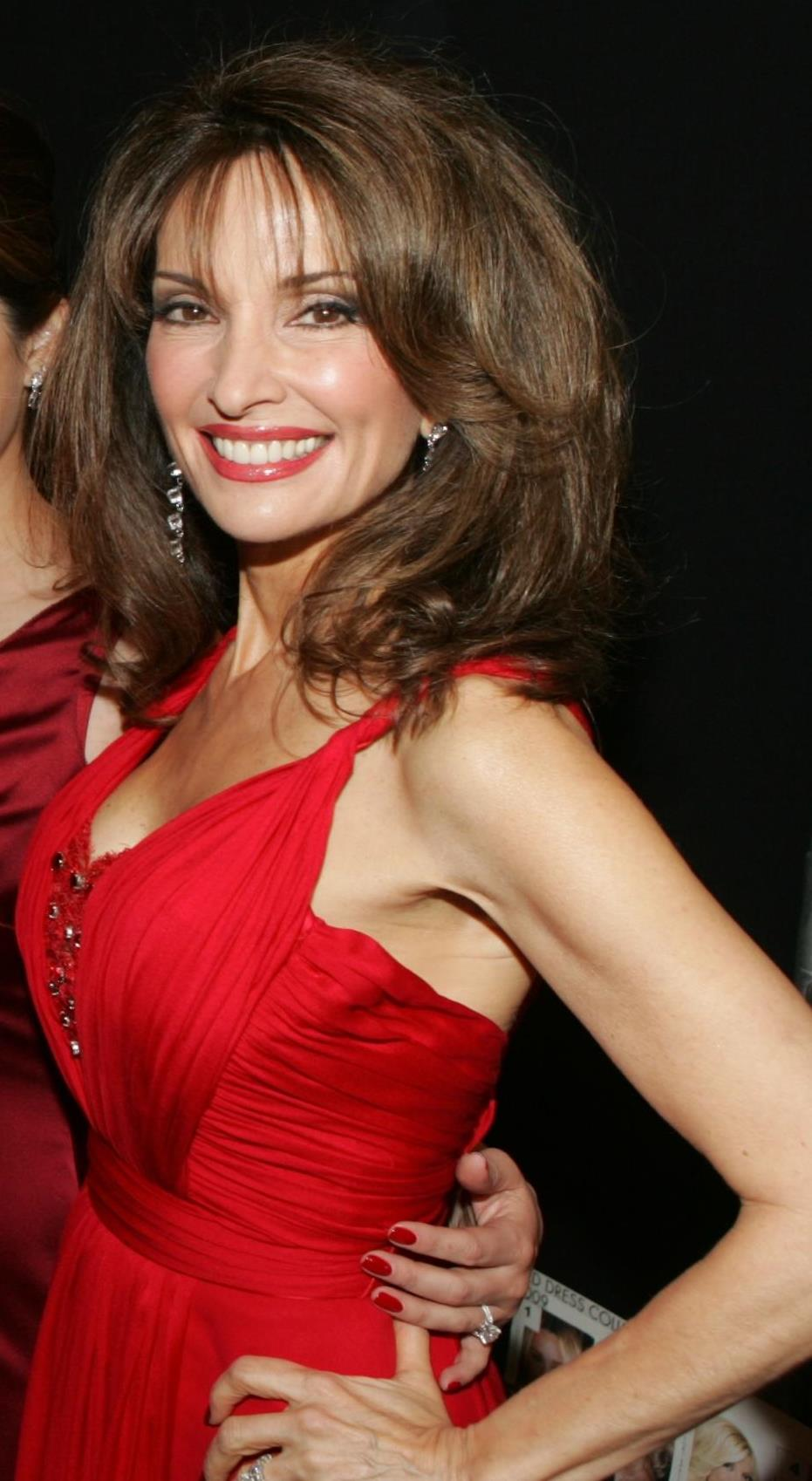
Susan Lucci has received the most nominations in this category, with a total of twenty-one for her portrayal of Erica Kane on All My Children, winning once in 1999.

The following individuals received two or more nominations in this category:

21 nominations

- Susan Lucci

12 nominations

- Michelle Stafford

11 nominations

- Kim Zimmer

10 nominations

- Susan Flannery
- Maura West

9 nominations

- Jeanne Cooper
- Elizabeth Hubbard
- Erika Slezak
- Finola Hughes

8 nominations

- Laura Wright

7 nominations

- Nancy Lee Grahn
- Heather Tom

6 nominations

- Julia Barr

5 nominations

- Helen Gallagher
- Eileen Davidson

4 nominations

- Crystal Chappell
- Leslie Charleson
- Susan Seaforth Hayes
- Beverlee McKinsey
- Robin Strasser
- Marcy Walker
- Jess Walton

3 nominations

- Martha Byrne
- Melissa Claire Egan
- Linda Dano
- Katherine Kelly Lang
- Peggy McCay
- Marci Miller
- Debbi Morgan
- Cynthia Watros
- Jacqueline MacInnes Wood
- Arianne Zucker
- Mary Stuart

2 nominations

- Nancy Addison
- Rachel Ames
- Sharon Case
- Kassie DePaiva
- Bobbie Eakes
- Ann Flood
- Genie Francis
- Sharon Gabet
- Deidre Hall
- Katherine Kelly Lang
- Judith Light
- Gina Tognoni
- Hillary B. Smith
- Ruth Warrick
- Victoria Wyndham
- Colleen Zenk

== Series with most awards ==
11 wins

- One Life to Live

9 wins

- The Bold and the Beautiful

7 wins

- The Young and the Restless

5 wins

- Guiding Light

4 wins

- General Hospital

3 wins

- Another World
- As the World Turns
- Days of our Lives
- Ryan's Hope

2 wins

- All My Children
