= 17th Daytime Emmy Awards =

- Date: June 28, 1990
- Location: Marriott Marquis Hotel
- Presented by: National Academy of Television Arts and Sciences
- Hosted by: Oprah Winfrey

Highlights
- Outstanding Drama Series: Santa Barbara
- Outstanding Game Show: Jeopardy!

Television/radio coverage
- Network: ABC

The 17th Daytime Emmy Awards were held on Thursday, June 28, 1990, on ABC, to commemorate excellence in American daytime programming between March 6, 1989, and March 5, 1990. The event aired from 3 to 5 p.m. EST, live from the Marriott Marquis Hotel in New York City. It preempted General Hospital.

== Outstanding Drama Series ==
- All My Children
- Guiding Light
- Santa Barbara
- The Young and the Restless

== Outstanding Lead Actor ==
- David Canary (Adam Chandler & Stuart Chandler, All My Children)
- Stephen Schnetzer (Cass Winthrop, Another World)
- A Martinez (Cruz Castillo, Santa Barbara)
- Peter Bergman (Jack Abbott, The Young and the Restless)
- Eric Braeden (Victor Newman, The Young and the Restless)

== Outstanding Lead Actress ==
- Susan Lucci (Erica Kane, All My Children)
- Elizabeth Hubbard (Lucinda Walsh, As the World Turns)
- Finola Hughes (Anna Devane, General Hospital)
- Kim Zimmer (Reva Shayne, Guiding Light)
- Jeanne Cooper (Katherine Chancellor, The Young and the Restless)

== Outstanding Supporting Actor ==
- Robert Gentry (Ross Chandler, All My Children)
- Kin Shriner (Scott Baldwin, General Hospital)
- Kristoff St. John (Adam Marshall, Generations)
- Jerry verDorn (Ross Marler, Guiding Light)
- Roscoe Born (Robert Barr, Santa Barbara)
- Henry Darrow (Rafael Castillo, Santa Barbara)
- Quinn Redeker (Rex Sterling, The Young and the Restless)

== Outstanding Supporting Actress ==
- Julia Barr (Brooke English, All My Children)
- Mary Jo Catlett (Mary Finnegan, General Hospital)
- Lynn Herring (Lucy Coe, General Hospital)
- Michelle Forbes (Sonni Carrera, Guiding Light)
- Jess Walton (Jill Abbott, The Young and the Restless)

== Outstanding Younger Actor ==
- Andrew Kavovit (Paul Ryan, As the World Turns)
- Bryan Buffington (Bill Lewis, Guiding Light)

== Outstanding Younger Actress ==
- Cady McClain (Dixie Cooney, All My Children)
- Liz Vassey (Emily Ann Sago, All My Children)
- Charlotte Ross (Eve Donovan, Days of Our Lives)
- Kimberly McCullough (Robin Scorpio, General Hospital)

== Outstanding Drama Series Writing Team ==
- All My Children
- Guiding Light
- One Life to Live
- Santa Barbara
- The Young and the Restless

== Outstanding Drama Series Directing Team ==
- All My Children
- As the World Turns
- Santa Barbara
- The Young and the Restless

== Outstanding Game Show ==
- Jeopardy! - A Production of Merv Griffin Enterprises (Syn. by KingWorld)
- The Price Is Right - A Mark Goodson Production for CBS
- Wheel of Fortune - A Merv Griffin Production for CBS (Syn. by KingWorld)
- Win, Lose or Draw - A Kilne & Friends Production for NBC (Syn. by Buena Vista)

== Outstanding Game Show Host ==
TIE

- Alex Trebek (Jeopardy!/Classic Concentration)
- Bob Barker (The Price Is Right)
- Pat Sajak (Wheel of Fortune)

== Outstanding Animated Program ==
- Patsy Cameron, Clive A. Smith, Tedd Anasti, Patrick Loubert, Michael Hirsh, David Geffen, Tim Burton, Stephen Hodgins, Robin Budd and Lenora Hume (Beetlejuice)
- Terence Harrison, Bruce Talkington, Carter Crocker, Ed Ghertner, Ken Kessel, Stephen Sustarsic, Karl Geurs and Mark Zaslove (The New Adventures of Winnie-the-Pooh)
- Lane Raichert, Paul Sommer, Joseph Barbera, Don Lusk, Ray Patterson, Laren Bright, William Hanna and Bill Matheny (A Pup Named Scooby-Doo)
- Tad Stones, Alan Zaslove, Ken Koonce, John Kimball, Bob Zamboni, Rick Leon and Bryce Malek (Chip 'n Dale Rescue Rangers)

== Outstanding Film Sound Editing ==
- Rich Harrison, Charlie King and Rick Hinson (DuckTales)
- Dean G. Manly, Jackson Schwartz, Ron Fedele, Al Breitenbach, Kenneth R. Burton and Steven D. Williams (Muppet Babies)
- Glenn A. Jordan, Greg Teall, John Walker, Steve Kirklys, Peter Cole and Ken Dahlinger (Pee-wee's Playhouse)
- Rob Kirkpatrick, Stephen Hudecki and Mac Holyoke (Beetlejuice)

== Outstanding Children's Series ==
- Reading Rainbow

== Lifetime achievement award ==
- Mark Goodson
