= 19th Daytime Emmy Awards =

- Date: June 23, 1992
- Presented by: National Academy of Television Arts and Sciences
- Hosted by: Phil Donahue; Susan Lucci

Highlights
- Outstanding Drama Series: All My Children
- Outstanding Game Show: Jeopardy!

Television/radio coverage
- Network: NBC

The 19th Daytime Emmy Awards were held on June 23, 1992, hosted by Phil Donahue and Susan Lucci.

== Outstanding Drama Series ==
- All My Children
- As the World Turns
- Guiding Light
- The Young and the Restless

== Outstanding Lead Actor ==
- Peter Bergman (Jack Abbott, The Young and the Restless)
- David Canary (Adam Chandler & Stuart Chandler, All My Children)
- Nicolas Coster (Lionel Lockridge, Santa Barbara)
- A Martinez (Cruz Castillo, Santa Barbara)
- Michael Zaslow (Roger Thorpe, Guiding Light)

== Outstanding Lead Actress ==
- Jeanne Cooper (Katherine Chancellor, The Young and the Restless)
- Elizabeth Hubbard (Lucinda Walsh, As the World Turns)
- Susan Lucci (Erica Kane, All My Children)
- Erika Slezak (Victoria Lord, One Life to Live)
- Jessica Tuck (Megan Gordon Harrison, One Life to Live)

== Outstanding Supporting Actor ==
- Bernie Barrow (Louie Slavinski, Loving)
- Thom Christopher (Carlo Hesser, One Life to Live)
- Rick Hearst (Alan-Michael Spaulding, Guiding Light)
- Charles Keating (Carl Hutchins, Another World)
- Jerry verDorn (Ross Marler, Guiding Light)

== Outstanding Supporting Actress ==
- Darlene Conley (Sally Spectra, The Bold and the Beautiful)
- Linda Dano (Felicia Gallant, Another World)
- Maureen Garrett (Holly Reade, Guiding Light)
- Lynn Herring (Lucy Coe, General Hospital)
- Maeve Kinkead (Vanessa Chamberlain, Guiding Light)

== Outstanding Younger Actor ==
- Scott DeFreitas (Andrew Dixon, As the World Turns)
- Jeff Phillips (Hart Jessup, Guiding Light)
- James Patrick Stuart (Will Cortlandt, All My Children)
- Kristoff St. John (Neil Winters, The Young and the Restless)
- Dondre Whitfield (Terrence Frye, All My Children)

== Outstanding Younger Actress ==
- Tricia Cast (Nina Webster, The Young and the Restless)
- Beth Ehlers (Harley Cooper, Guiding Light)
- Alla Korot (Jenna Norris, Another World)
- Cady McClain (Dixie Cooney, All My Children)
- Melissa Reeves (Jennifer Horton, Days of Our Lives)

== Outstanding Drama Series Writing Team ==
- All My Children
- Guiding Light
- One Life to Live
- The Young and the Restless

== Outstanding Drama Series Directing Team ==
- Another World
- As the World Turns
- The Young and the Restless

== Outstanding Game Show ==
- Jeopardy! (Merv Griffin Enterprises/KingWorld)
- The $100,000 Pyramid (Stewart TeleEnterprises/Multimedia Entertainment)
- Family Feud (Mark Goodson Productions/All American Television/CBS)
- The Price Is Right (Mark Goodson Productions/CBS)

== Outstanding Game Show Host ==
- Bob Barker (The Price Is Right)
- Dom DeLuise (Candid Camera)
- Alex Trebek (Jeopardy!)

== Outstanding Hairstyling ==
- Richard Sabre, and Tish Simpson (Adventures in Wonderland)
- Robert Miss (The Joan Rivers Show)

== Outstanding Film Sound Mixing ==
- Jim Hodson, Bill Koepnick and Harry Andronis (Back to the Future: The Animated Series)
- Harry Andronis, Tom Maydeck and Russell Brower (Tiny Toon Adventures)
- Bruce Chianese (Spaceship Earth: Our Global Environment)
- James L. Aicholtz, Robert L. Harman and Allen L. Stone (Darkwing Duck)
- Robert L. Harman, James L. Aicholtz and Patrick Cyccone Jr. (James Bond Jr.)
- James L. Aicholtz and Robert L. Harman (Teenage Mutant Ninja Turtles)

== Outstanding Film Sound Editing ==
- Bill Koepnick, Russell Brower, Jim Hodson, Aaron L. King, Matt Thorne and Mark Keatts (Back to the Future: The Animated Series)
- Warren Taylor, Ivan Bilancio and Richard C. Allen (Muppet Babies)
- Charlie King, Andrew Rose, David Lynch, Jennifer Harrison, Rich Harrison, Rick Hinson and Jerry Winicki (The New Adventures of Winnie the Pooh)
- Carol Lewis, John Mortarotti, Kerry Dean Williams, Martina Young, Rich Harrison, Catherine MacKenzie, Doub Pearce and Tally Paulos (Teenage Mutant Ninja Turtles)
- Jennifer Harrison, Rick Hinson, Cecil Broughton, Rich Harrison, David Lynch, Jerry Winicki, Charlie King and Andrew Rose (Darkwing Duck)

== Outstanding Music Direction and Composition ==
- Mark Watters (Tiny Toon Adventures - "Love Disconnection")
- Mark Mothersbaugh, Laura Raty (Pedretti), Mona Lia Ventris, Andrew Todd, John C. Volaitis, Jim Goodwin, Bill Mumy, David Kendrick, Patricia Friedman, Denis M. Hannigan and Michael Alemania (Adventures in Wonderland)
- Cheryl Hardwick, Stephen Lawrence, Dave Conner, Paul Jacobs, Christopher Cerf, Sarah Durkee, Tony Geiss and Jeff Moss (Sesame Street)
- Bodie Chandler, Gary Lionelli and Tom Worrall (Tom & Jerry Kids)

== Outstanding Writing in an Animated Program ==
- Nicholas Hollander, Tom Ruegger, Paul Dini, and Sherri Stoner (Tiny Toon Adventures)
- Carter Crocker, and Tad Stones (Darkwing Duck - "Dead Duck")
- Craig Bartlett, Paul Germain, Joe Ansolabehere, Mitchell Kriegman, Steve Viksten (Rugrats)
- Steve Roberts, Duane Capizzi (Darkwing Duck - "Negaduck")
- Mark Evanier (Garfield and Friends)
- Henry Gilroy, Gordon Kent, Bill Kopp, Art Vitello, Chris Otsuki, and Mark Saraceni (Taz-Mania)

== Outstanding Animated Program ==
- Vanessa Coffey, Gabor Csupo, Arlene Klasky, Paul Germain, Mary Harrington, Sherry Gunther, David Blum, Bee Beckman, Norton Virgien, Howard E. Baker, and Dan Thompson (Rugrats)
- Brad Gunther, Johan Edström, Christine Martin, Tony Eastman, David Campbell, Melanie Grisanti, Vanessa Coffey, Yvette Kaplan, Jean-Pierre Jacquet, Jim Jinkins, David Martin, John Paratore, Carol Millican, Ken Kimmelman, Mary Harrington (Doug)
- Steven Spielberg, Tom Ruegger, Sherri Stoner, Rich Arons, and Art Leonardi (Tiny Toon Adventures)
- Tad Stones, Alan Zaslove, Bob Hathcock, Ken Kessel, Russ Mooney, Toby Shelton (producer), Hank Tucker (producer), James T. Walker, Carole Beers, Marsh Lamore, Rick Leon, and John Kimball (Darkwing Duck)
- Ken Kessel, Mark Zaslove, Russ Mooney, Terence Harrison, Charles A. Nichols (The New Adventures of Winnie the Pooh)

== Lifetime achievement award ==
- William J. Bell
