= Elizabeth Wright Hubbard =

American physician and homeopath (1896–1967)

- Born: Elizabeth Wright; February 18, 1896; New York City, U.S.
- Died: May 22, 1967 (aged 71)
- Education: Barnard College (BA); Columbia University College of Physicians and Surgeons (MD)
- Occupations: Physician, homeopath
- Known for: Leadership in American and international homeopathic associations
- Title: President of the American Institute of Homeopathy (1959–1961)
- Spouse: Benjamin Alldritt Hubbard (m. 1930)
- Children: 3, including Elizabeth Hubbard
- Parent: Rev. Dr. Merle St. Croix Wright (father)

Elizabeth Wright Hubbard (February 18, 1896 – May 22, 1967) was an American physician and homeopath best known for leadership and editorial work in the field of homeopathy.

== Biography ==
Hubbard was born in New York City, the daughter of Rev. Dr. Merle St. Croix Wright, the pastor of Harlem Unitarian Church. She was educated at the Horace Mann School and graduated from Barnard College in 1917, and in 1921 earned an MD from the Columbia University College of Physicians and Surgeons, as one of the first six females to do so. She completed her internship at Bellevue Hospital. She then spent two years in Europe studying homeopathy in Stuttgart, Vienna, under Adolf Stiegele, in Geneva under Pierre Schmidt, and in Tübingen under Emil Schlegel.

Hubbard subsequently assumed leadership roles as president of the International Hahnemannian Association from 1945 to 1946, and of the American Institute of Homeopathy from 1959 to 1961. She served as editor of the Homoeopathic Recorder, the Journal of the American Institute of Homeopathy and the Journal of the American Institute of Homeopathy. She was on the faculty of the AFH postgraduate homeopathic school.

Hubbard was also involved in Anthroposophy and served as president of the Anthroposophical Society in the United States.

She married Benjamin Alldritt Hubbard in 1930. They had a daughter, the actress Elizabeth Hubbard, and two sons, Theodore C. Hubbard and talent manager Merle Hubbard.

== Publications ==
- Homoeopathy as Art and Science, Ed. Maesimund B. Panos, MD, and Della des Rosiers, Beaconsfield Publishers Ltd, Beaconsfield, U.K. 1990 (ISBN 0-906584-26-4)
- A Brief Study Course in Homeopathy, Roy & Company; 3rd ed. (enlarged) edition (1959), and Indian Edition (1977)
