= Lucinda Walsh =

Soap opera fictional character

- As the World Turns character
- Portrayed by: Elizabeth Hubbard
- Duration: 1984–2010
- First appearance: April 1984
- Last appearance: September 17, 2010
- Created by: Tom King; Millee Taggart
- Introduced by: Mary-Ellis Bunim
In-universe information
- Other names: Mary Ellen Walters; Lucinda Guest; Lucinda Esteban; Lucinda Dixon; Lucinda Stenbeck; Lucinda Wheatley
- Occupation: Former Owner/former CEO of Worldwide Industries; Owner and publisher of City Times; Board member of Memorial Hospital; Former CEO of Walsh Enterprises; Owner of RiverWalk
- Parents: Gloria Keller
- Siblings: Royce Keller; Samantha Markham; Neal Keller Alcott
- Spouse: Jacobo Esteban (pre-1984); Martin Guest (pre-1984); James Walsh (pre-1984); John Dixon (1987–91); James Stenbeck (1998–2000); Brian Wheatley (2008–09)
- Daughters: Sierra Esteban
- Adoptive daughters: Lily Walsh Snyder; Bianca Walsh
- Grandchildren: Bryant Montgomery; Lucy Montgomery; Luke Snyder (adoptive); Faith Snyder (adoptive); Natalie Snyder (adoptive); Ethan Snyder (adoptive)
- Nieces: Georgia Tucker

Lucinda Walsh is a fictional character on the CBS soap opera As the World Turns (ATWT). Elizabeth Hubbard played the role from April 1984 until the show's final episode on September 17, 2010. The character is described as a no-nonsense businesswoman and mega-mogul who transformed into one of daytime's most memorable and prolific characters. Hubbard left the show briefly in March 1999, but returned in August of that year. A loving mother and grandmother, while still retaining her edge fiery nature, she has been front and center in some of the show's biggest stories.

== Casting ==
Elizabeth Hubbard joined the cast in 1984 following an impressive career in daytime, with her earlier roles that included Anne Benedict Fletcher on CBS' The Guiding Light in 1962 and Carol Kramer on The Edge of Night in 1963 before joining NBC's The Doctors. She starred on the show from 1964 to 1969, 1970 to 1977 and 1981 to 1982. She then joined ABC's One Life to Live as Estelle Chadwick from 1983 to 1984 before joining the cast of ATWT later that year. Hubbard's daytime roles are not limited to the United States, as she appeared on the Dutch RTL 4 soap opera Goede tijden, slechte tijden as Sair Poindexter in 2009.

In an interview with TV Guide columnist Michael Logan on August 17, 2010, Hubbard talked about her years in daytime and her appreciation for her role on ATWT.

"I've been so lucky playing Lucinda — a character who could do anything. She could lie, break the law, she didn't have to be good and she always had that checkbook ready. Always!"

—Elizabeth Hubbard, TV Guide

Hubbard has also won or had been nominated for many awards throughout her run on the show. She was nominated for eight Daytime Emmy Awards for Daytime Emmy Award for Outstanding Lead Actress in a Drama Series in 1986, 1987, 1988, 1989, 1990, 1991, 1992 and 1999. She also was nominated for ten Soap Opera Digest Awards in 1986, 1988, 1989, 1990, 1991, 1992, 1994, 1994, 1997 and 2000.

== Backstory ==
Lucinda Walsh was born Mary Ellen Walters and her parents broke up not long after her birth. After living with her father for a number of years, she ran away to Montega, South America and married Jacobo Estaban and gave birth to a daughter, Sierra Esteban. After her marriage failed and she was banished from seeing Sierra again, Mary Ellen changed her name to Lucinda and remarried. Her new husband, Martin Guest, arranged for them to illegally adopt a daughter, whom they named Lily. When the truth came out about the method of Lily's adoption, Martin committed suicide. Lucinda tried marriage again with James Walsh, but he died shortly after their marriage.

== Storylines ==
=== 1980s ===
Lucinda arrived in Oakdale and attempted to take over Whit McColl's newspaper, The Argus. Whit and Lucinda's former husband Martin Guest had been associates and she blamed him for her husband's suicide. This began a nearly two-decade long feud between Lucinda and Whit's then wife Lisa Grimaldi. Lucinda first attempted to keep her scandalous past a secret. It was only after a dangerous situation in Montega, involving Sierra Esteban and other Oakdale residents, that she revealed the fact that she was Sierra's mother. Her daughter Lily Walsh Snyder had believed that Lucinda was her biological mother for a long time, never knowing of her adoption. After Lily had fallen in love with stable boy Holden Snyder, Lily was shocked to find out that not only was she adopted, but that her mother was Holden's adopted sister, Iva Snyder. Lily and Lucinda remained at odds for years but eventually repaired their relationship. In 1987, following a spirited argument where both of them ended up fully clothed in her hot tub, Lucinda impulsively married her long-time rival Dr. John Dixon. Although they loved each other very much, Lucinda's scheming ways eventually proved to be more than John could handle, particularly after her insecurities led her to target his relationship with his newfound son Duke. They divorced in 1991, but remained close friends. Lucinda also had an attraction to Craig Montgomery, who romanced and married Sierra. Their attraction grew and culminated in a memorable kiss that Lily walked in on, leading to a near 25-year love-hate relationship.

=== 1990s ===
Lucinda lost Walsh Enterprises to Connor Jamison, who turned out to be Connor Walsh, the long-lost granddaughter of James Walsh. Connor and her brother Evan orchestrated a takeover of Walsh Enterprises. Lucinda bounced back and created her own company, Worldwide Industries. Lucinda recalled her childhood and her complicated relationship with her mother, Gloria. She learned of Gloria's other children, her half brother Royce Keller and half sister Neal Alcott and Samantha Markham. Royce, who suffered from dissociative identity disorder, killed Neal before Lucinda could tell them the truth. Lucinda did, accept Samantha as her sister. After marrying and divorcing James Stenbeck she became a single woman yet again.

=== 2000–2010 ===
When Rose D'Angelo, Lily's twin sister who was also illegally adopted at birth, surfaced in Oakdale, Lucinda took her under her wing before her death. In 2005, Lucinda was diagnosed with breast cancer. She refused to let Sierra and Lily help and support her and didn't want to be away from Worldwide for too long, so she began to take trips to Mexico with Keith Morrissey, Lily's boyfriend, for experimental treatments. Lucinda's cancer soon went into remission and Lily left Keith, returning to her true love, Holden. Soon after, Lucinda was the main voice of reason when young drifter Jade Taylor came to town claiming to be Rose's daughter. Lucinda had a feeling that Jade was a fraud, and later on, that proved to be the truth. Since then, Lucinda has been involved in the life on Lily's son, Luke. She was concerned about Luke's alcoholism and was willing to support him in his decisions while still offering her own brand of tough love. When Luke told his family that he is gay, Lucinda happily accepted her grandson's confession and promised to completely support him. Soon after Luke's confession, his biological father Damian Grimaldi showed up with hopes of luring his son back to his home in Malta. Lucinda, from the very beginning, pegged Damian's intentions as nothing but detrimental to Luke's happiness and called him on it. Damian eventually left town after his schemes were unsuccessful. Lucinda began working with Katie Peretti on the publication of the novel Oakdale Confidential: Secrets Revealed, a book that was released that dispelled various secrets about the town. In mid-2008, Lucinda hired Brian Wheatley to run Luke's organization and Brian and Lucinda began dating. It was revealed that Lucinda was one of the people involved in helping Dusty Donovan fake his own death. This led to Lily saying that she wants nothing more to do with her. She was arrested on for being an accomplice in Dusty's fake death but soon released. Lucinda learned that her breast cancer returned and that she needed to start treatment immediately. After coming out of surgery, Lucinda proposed to Brian Wheatley and he accepted. They were then married. Soon after they married, during Lucinda's recovery, she noticed that Brain would not consummate their marriage. The night before their wedding, Brian kissed Lucinda's grandson Luke while Luke was drunk and he kissed him several more times, leading Luke's boyfriend to intervene. Lucinda found out about what had happened and divorced Brian, who admitted to her that he was a man struggling to come out as gay. In 2010, Lucinda reunited with her ex-husband, John Dixon. John attempted to help Lucinda reconcile with Lily again, but when the attempt failed, he invited her to accompany him to Amsterdam for a month. She accepted, and they fell in love again, vowing to spend the rest of their days having fun together.

== Reception ==
Elizabeth Hubbard's character Lucinda Walsh is often described as a "savvy businesswoman" and a "cutthroat." Her love for her daughters and attraction towards dangerous men often drove her to great lengths over the years. Many of Hubbard's co-stars praise her work and dedication to acting. In an interview with TV Guide, Scott Bryce, who played Craig Montgomery cited his appreciation for Hubbard and his dissatisfaction with the show for not exploring more story between the two actors. "That woman taught me how to do this genre. She's a remarkable actress and an even more remarkable person. Our chemistry is off the charts and I don't know why they wouldn't explore that." In an interview with We Love Soaps during the website's countdown for the "50 Greatest Soap Actresses" where Hubbard came in at #15, Martha Byrne, who played her daughter Lily Walsh Snyder said,

There are so many stories about working with Elizabeth that are worth mentioning, I could write a book about her influence and talent. When you do a scene with Liz, you never do the same scene twice. Liz is the ultimate acting partner who always makes you listen. I've seen actors run with her during a scene and others run away. The actors that embraced her gift of play became better actors for doing so. In my many years of playing her daughter, Liz never once "phoned it in." Every script had character thoughts and rewrites scribbled on it at 7am during our first rehearsal. When fans talk to me about Liz and tell me their fondest memories, the moments they speak of were always the ones that came from Liz herself. Everyone loves Lucinda because of the woman behind the creation. Liz is probably the most fascinating person I know. I've begged her to write a book about her many adventures outside of acting, all of which are fascinating. There are so many layers to Liz the public is unaware of and I have been fortunate to have her in my life. I love her, truly, for so many reasons. My life has been enriched in so many ways for knowing her.

Hubbard's role on Goede tijden, slechte tijden came following a huge outpouring of support of the show from the Netherlands, whose fans greatly enjoy ATWT. Hubbard joined the show following an offer from the producers after appearing on a local talk show. In an interview with Soap Opera Digest columnist Mala Bhattacharjee on June 8, 2009, Hubbard talked about her enjoyment of appearing on the show and the international fan base associated with ATWT.

"I think it's marvelous. We need to be a community, because that's the whole point of soaps, anyway. People watch intergenerationally, and feel that they're together and have something to hang onto."

—Elizabeth Hubbard, Soap Opera Digest
