= Elizabeth Hubbard =

American actress (1933–2023)

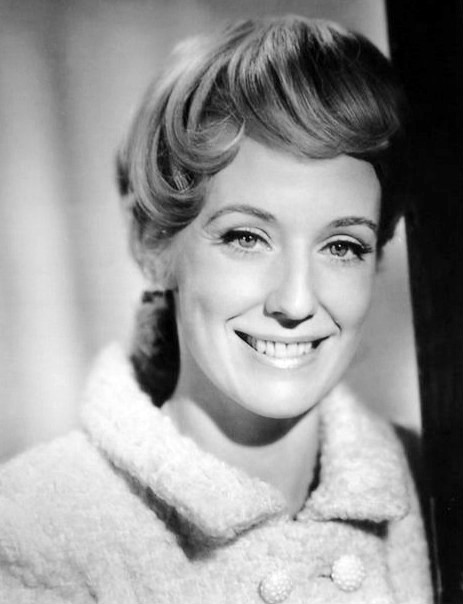
- Hubbard in 1963
- Born: December 22, 1933; New York City, NY, U.S.
- Died: April 8, 2023 (aged 89); Roxbury, Connecticut, U.S.
- Occupation: Actress
- Years active: 1955–2018
- Spouse: David Bennett (m. 1968–1973)
- Children: 1
- Mother: Elizabeth Wright Hubbard

Elizabeth Hubbard (December 22, 1933 – April 8, 2023) was an American actress, recognized for her role as Althea Davis on the NBC daytime soap opera, The Doctors (1964–1969, 1970–77, 1981–1982), for which she received the Daytime Emmy Award for Outstanding Lead Actress in a Drama Series in 1974, and as businesswoman Lucinda Walsh on the CBS soap opera, As the World Turns (1984–2010) for which she received eight Daytime Emmy Award nominations. Hubbard also starred in films such as I Never Sang for My Father (1970), The Bell Jar (1979), and Ordinary People (1980), and received another Emmy Award for playing former First Lady Edith Wilson in the television film First Ladies Diaries: Edith Wilson (1976).

== Early life and education ==
Hubbard was born on December 22, 1933, in New York City, to Elizabeth Wright Hubbard and Benjamin Alldritt Hubbard. Her mother, a physician, was a pioneer in homeopathy and one of the first women to earn a medical degree from Columbia University. She had two brothers, Theodore and Merle, an opera talent manager.

Hubbard attended Radcliffe College in Cambridge, Massachusetts, and graduated summa cum laude in 1955. She pursued her theatrical education at the Royal Academy of Dramatic Art (RADA) in London, where she was the first American to receive the school's silver medal. She graduated from RADA in 1957.

== Acting career ==
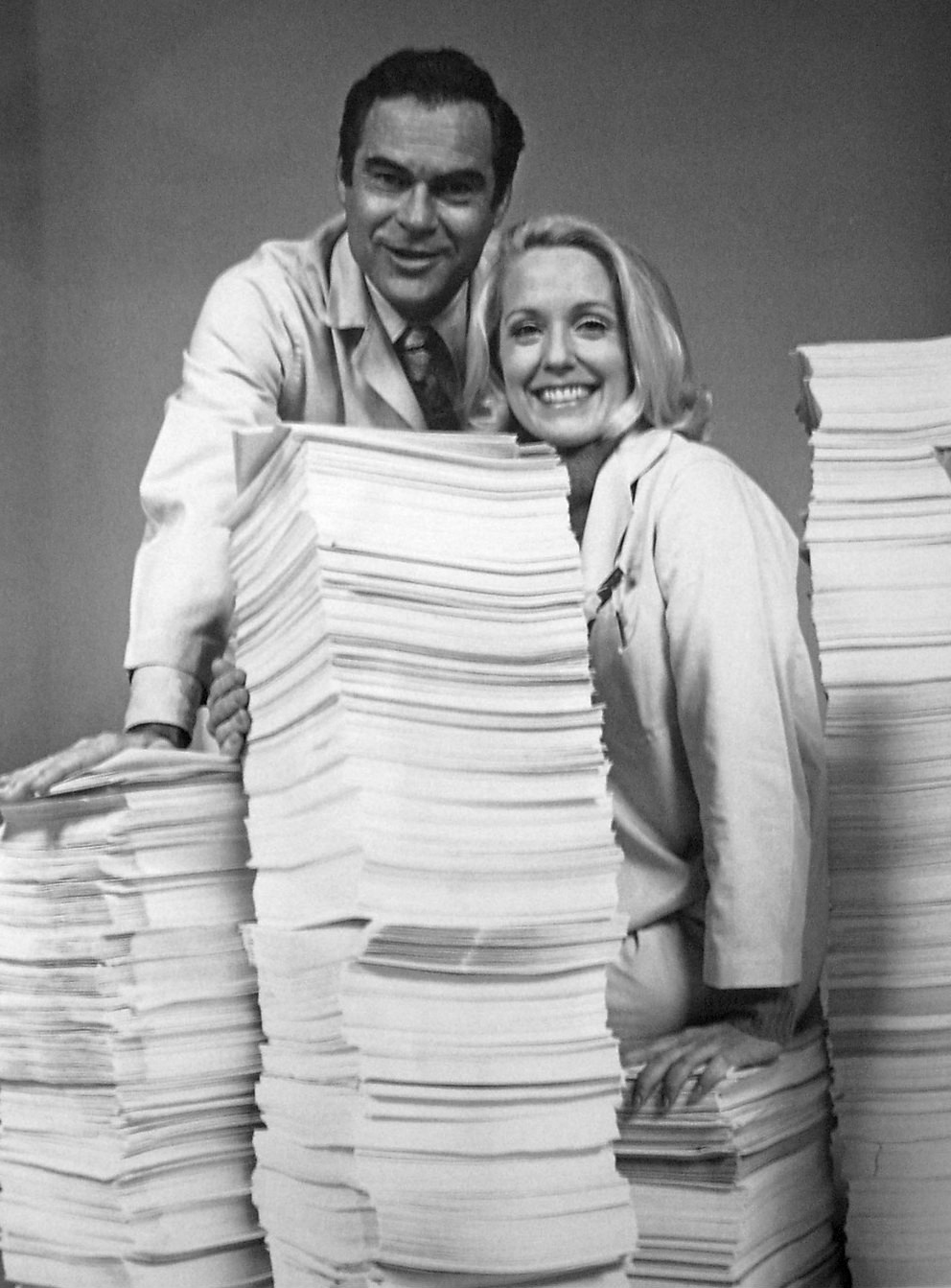
Hubbard with James Pritchett celebrates The Doctors 10th anniversary in 1973

Hubbard made her Broadway debut as a replacement actress in a revival of The Threepenny Opera in 1955. She later performed in 14 Broadway productions, including The Passion of Josef D., The Physicists (for which she received the 1965 Clarence Derwent Award for Most Promising Female), A Time for Singing, A Day in the Death of Joe Egg, I Remember Mama and Dance a Little Closer. Hubbard began her screen career in 1962, starring as Anne Fletcher on the soap opera Guiding Light. The following year, she joined the cast of The Edge of Night as Carol Kramer. In 1964, she inaugurated the role of Dr. Althea Davis on NBC's year-old soap opera The Doctors. Hubbard played the role until October 1969, when she left to pursue a career in Hollywood. She returned to the role as of October 1, 1970 and continued the role until 1977. She returned again in 1981 and remained with the show until its cancellation in 1982. In 1974, Hubbard was awarded the first Daytime Emmy Award for Outstanding Lead Actress in a Drama Series. Hubbard's pairing with the character of Dr. Nick Bellini (Gerald Gordon) made them one of the most popular romantic couples in soap operas, dominating the show's storyline during the later half of the 1960s and for most of the 1970s.

In 1970, Hubbard made her big screen debut in the Academy Award-nominated drama film I Never Sang for My Father opposite Melvyn Douglas and Gene Hackman. In 1976, Hubbard won an additional Daytime Emmy Award for her portrayal of Edith Wilson in the television film First Ladies Diaries: Edith Wilson. She also appeared in films The Bell Jar (1979), Ordinary People (1980), Cold River (1982), Center Stage (2000), and The Treatment (2006).

After The Doctors was cancelled, Hubbard joined the cast of One Life to Live in the recurring role of society matron Estelle Chadwick. In 1984, she joined As the World Turns as businesswoman Lucinda Walsh. She was nominated nine times for a Daytime Emmy for the role. Hubbard left the program in 1999 due to a disagreement over the character's direction, but was persuaded to return several months later by the show's new executive producer. Hubbard was featured in a prominent storyline in 2005 when her character was diagnosed with cancer. She was in the show's 50th anniversary episode in April 2006 and remained with the show until its final episode in September 2010.

In July 2009, she began a recurring role on the Dutch soap opera Goede tijden, slechte tijden (Good Times, Bad Times), and played the role of Sair Poindexter, an American sexologist and mother of character Irene Huygens, played by Anita Donk. Hubbard, who traveled frequently to the Dutch province of Friesland where her boyfriend resided, was cast after meeting the writers on one of her visits. As the World Turns also aired in the Netherlands and Hubbard was already well-known there as a result.

In 2015, Hubbard appeared as Eva Montgomery on the soap opera web series Anacostia. She was nominated in 2016 for a Daytime Emmy for Outstanding Actress in a Digital Daytime Drama Series for the role.

== Marriage and child ==
Hubbard was married to furrier David Bennett from 1968 to 1973. They had one child, a son, Jeremy Bennett (born September 20, 1971).

== Death ==
Hubbard died of cancer at her home in Roxbury, Connecticut, on April 8, 2023, at the age of 89.

== Filmography ==
Year	Title	Role	Notes
1962	Guiding Light	Anne Fletcher	May 1962 to October 31, 1962
1963	The Edge of Night	Carol Kramer	Series regular
1964–1969,1970–77, 1981–1982	The Doctors	Dr. Althea Davis	Series regular Daytime Emmy Award for Outstanding Lead Actress in a Drama Series (1974)
1970	The Virginian	Mary Marshall	Episode: "You Can Lead a Horse to Water"
1970	Marcus Welby, M.D.	Dr. Gardner	Episode: "The Other Side of the Chart"
1970	The Ceremony of Innocence	Queen Emma	Television film
1970	I Never Sang for My Father	Peggy	
1976	First Ladies Diaries: Edith Wilson	Edith Wilson	Television film Daytime Emmy Award for Outstanding Actress in a Daytime Drama Special
1979	The Bell Jar	Vikki St. John	
1980	Ordinary People	Ruth	
1982	Cold River	Pauline Hood Allison	
1983–1984	One Life to Live	Estelle Chadwick	Series regular
1984–2010	As the World Turns	Lucinda Walsh	Series regular Nominated — Daytime Emmy Award for Outstanding Lead Actress in a Drama Series (1986-1992, 1999); Nominated — Soap Opera Digest Award for Outstanding Villainess in a Drama Series – Daytime (1986, 1988); Nominated — Soap Opera Digest Award for Outstanding Lead Actress in a Daytime Drama (1986, 1989-1994); Nominated — Soap Opera Digest Award for Outstanding Comic Actress: Daytime (1990); Nominated — Soap Opera Digest Award for Outstanding Female Showstopper (1997); Nominated — Soap Opera Digest Award for Favorite Return (2000)
1992	Law & Order	Mrs. Cleary	Episode: "The Corporate Veil"
2000	Center Stage	Joan Miller	
2002	The Job	Mike's mother-in-law	Episode: "Vacation"
2005	Hope & Faith	Arlene	Episode: "Catering-a-ding-ding"
2006	The Treatment	Claire Marshall	
2008	Life on Mars	Sam's mother	Episode: "Tuesday's Dead"
2009	Goede tijden, slechte tijden	Sair Poindexter	19 episodes
2015-2018	Anacostia	Eva Montgomery	9 episodes Nominated — Daytime Emmy Award for Outstanding Lead Actress in a Digital Daytime Drama Series (2016); Nominated — Indie Series Award for Best Guest Actress - Drama (2016-2017)
