= List of One Life to Live crew =

The following is a list of producers, writers and directors who have worked on the American soap opera One Life to Live.

== Executive producers ==
Duration	Name
July 1968 – July 1977	Doris Quinlan
July 1977 – August 1983	Joseph Stuart
August 1983 – July 1984	Jean Arley
August 1984 – June 1991	Paul Rauch
July 1991 – June 1994	Linda Gottlieb
July 1994 – October 1996	Susan Bedsow Horgan
October 1996 – December 1997	Maxine Levinson
January 1998 – January 2001	Jill Farren Phelps
January 2001 – December 2002	Gary Tomlin
January 2003 – January 2012	Frank Valentini
April 2013 – August 2013	Jennifer Pepperman

== Head writers ==
Duration	Name
July 1968 – July 1972	Agnes Nixon; Paul Roberts; Don Wallace
August 1972 – September 1973	Agnes Nixon; Gordon Russell
September 1973 – October 1978	Gordon Russell
November 1978 – March 1980	Gordon Russell; Sam Hall
March 1980 – May 1982	Sam Hall; Peggy O'Shea
July 1982 – January 1983	Sam Hall; Henry Slesar
February 1983 – June 1983	Henry Slesar
June 1983 – December 1983	John William Corrington; Joyce Corrington
December 1983 – June 1984	Sam Hall; Peggy O'Shea
July 1984 – June 1987	Peggy O'Shea
July 1987 – January 1990	S. Michael Schnessel
January 1990 – November 1990	Craig Carlson; Leah Laiman
November 1990 – May 1991	Margaret DePriest; Craig Carlson; Leah Laiman
May 1991 – August 1991	Craig Carlson
August 1991 – January 1992	Michael Malone
January 1992 – February 1995	Josh Griffith; Michael Malone
March 1995 – March 1996	Michael Malone
April 1996 – December 1996	Leah Laiman; Jean Passanante; Peggy Sloane
December 1996 – Spring 1997	Jean Passanante; Peggy Sloane
Spring 1997 – March 29, 1998	Claire Labine; Matthew Labine
March 30, 1998 – December 31, 1998	Pamela K. Long
January 1999 – September 1999	Jill Farren Phelps (de facto, uncredited)
September 1999 – March 2001	Megan McTavish
March 2001 – January 31, 2003	Lorraine Broderick; Christopher Whitesell
February 3, 2003 – March 7, 2003	Josh Griffith
March 10, 2003 – March 22, 2004	Josh Griffith; Michael Malone
March 23, 2004 – November 24, 2004	Michael Malone
November 29, 2004 – December 10, 2004	Brian Frons; Frank Valentini
December 13, 2004 – May 7, 2007	Dena Higley
May 8, 2007 – September 10, 2007	Dena Higley; Ron Carlivati
September 11, 2007 – February 14, 2008	Ron Carlivati
February 15, 2008 – May 1, 2008	Gary Tomlin (WGA strike)
May 2, 2008 – January 13, 2012	Ron Carlivati
April 29, 2013 – July 1, 2013	Thom Racina; Susan Bedsow Horgan
July 1, 2013 – July 15, 2013	Thom Racina; Susan Bedsow Horgan; Jessica Klein
July 22, 2013 – August 19, 2013	Thom Racina; Jessica Klein

== Producers ==
Executive Producers

- Gary Tomlin; Executive producer (2001-2003)
- Linda Gottlieb, Executive producer (1991-1994)
- Jean Arley, Executive producer (1983-1984)
- Maxine Levinson, Executive producer (1996-1997)
- Susan Bedsow-Horgan, Executive producer (1994–96)
- Agnes Nixon, Executive producer (1968-1975)
- Jennifer Pepperman, Executive Producer (2013)
- Jill Farren Phelps, Executive producer (1998-2001)
- Frank Valentini, Executive Producer (2003-2012)
- Doris Quinlan, Executive producer (1968-1977)
- Paul Rauch; Executive producer (1984-1991)
- Paul Roberts, Co-executive producer (1968-1972)

Producers

- Suzanne Flynn, Producer (2000-?)
- Laura B. Goldberg, Producer (1996-1999)
- Walter Gorman, Producer (1968-1973)
- Zoya Kachadurian, Producer (1996-1998)
- Ellen Novack, Producer (1993-1998)
- Mary O'Leary, Producer (1998-2001)
- Mary Kelly Rodden, Producer (1994-1997)
- Mary Kelly Weir, Producer (1992-1999)
- Charlotte Weil, Producer (1985-1991)
- Frank Valentini; Production assistant (1989) and stage manager (1990)

Other

- Jennifer Rosen, Assistant producer (1998-2000); Assistant to the Executive Producer (1995-1997)
- Chuck Lioi, Associate Producer (1990-1993)
- Lisa de Cazotte, Associate producer (1987-1989) and Coordinating producer (1989-1991)
- Robyn Goodman, Supervising Producer (1992-1997)
- Leslie Kwartin, Supervising Producer (1991-1996)
- Sonia Blangiardo, Coordinating producer (2000-2002)
- Frank Valentini, Coordinating producer (1993); Supervising producer (1997-2001); Senior supervising producer (2001-2002); Executive producer (2003-2012)
- Stan Warnow, Post Production Producer (1992-1995)
- Margo Husin Call, Post Production Supervisor and Post Production Producer (1990-?)

== Writers ==
Head writers

- Megan McTavish; Head writer (1999-2001)
- Agnes Nixon; Head writer (1968-1973)
- Peggy O'Shea; Co-head writer (1980-1982, 1983-1984) and Head writer (1984-1987)
- Thom Racina; Head Writer (2013)
- Margaret DePriest; Head writer (1990-1991)
- Sam Hall; Co-head writer (1978-1980, 1983-1984); Head writer (1980-1983)
- John William Corrington, Co-head writer (1983)
- Joyce Hooper Corrington, Co-head writer (1983)
- Dena Higley; Head writer (2004-2007)
- Susan Bedsow Horgan; Head Writer (2013); Supervising Producer (1991-1994); Executive producer (1994-1996); Breakdown Writer (1988-1994)
- Pamela K. Long; Head writer (1998)
- Claire Labine; Head writer (1997-1998)
- Matthew Labine; Co-head writer (1997-1998)
- Leah Laiman; Co-head writer (1996-1998)
- Michael Malone; Head writer (1991-1994, 1995-1996, 2004); Co-head writer (1994-1995, 2003-2004); Story consultant (2003)
- Victor Miller; Associate head writer (1982-1984)
- Gordon Rayfield; Associate head writer (1993-1994) and Script writer (2003-2004)
- Ethel Brez, Associate head writer (1985-1992)
- Mel Brez, Associate head writer (1985-1992)
- Shelly Altman, Associate head writer (1999-2008, 2008-2011)
- Lorraine Broderick, Head writer (2001-2003); Associate head writer (2003-2004)
- Tom Casiello, Script writer (2004); Associate head writer (2004-2006)
- Richard Backus, Associate head writer (1995-1997, 1998-2004); head writer (1999)
- Anna Theresa Cascio; Associate head writer (1996-2002, 2003-2005, 2007–2008, 2008-2012)
- Michael Conforti, Associate head writer (2000-2001)
- Josh Griffith; Associate head writer (1991-1994, 2004) and co-head writer (1994-1995, 2003-2004); Head writer (2003)
- Victor Gialanella; Associate head writer (2006-2007)
- Janet Iacobuzio; Associate head writer (2005-2009)
- Frederick Johnson; Associate head writer (2008-2010)
- Meg Kelly; Associate head writer (2005)
- S. Michael Schnessel; Head writer (1987-1990)
- Joseph Stuart co-head writer (1977-1983)
- Henry Slesar; Co-head writer (1982-1983); Head writer (1983)
- Peggy Sloane; Associate head writer (1995-1996); Co-head writer (1996-1997)
- Gordon Russell; Co-head writer (1972-1973); Head writer (1973-1980)
- Chris Van Etten; Assistant to the EP (2001-2003); Writers' associate (2003); Continuity supervisor (2004); Associate head writer (2005-2008, 2008-2012)
- Ginger Redmon; Intern (1998); Assistant to the EP (1998); Continuity supervisor (1999-2003); Script writer (2003-2006)
- Addie Walsh; Associate head writer (1987-1991)
- Don Wallace; Co-head writer (1968-1972)
- Christopher Whitesell; Associate head writer (1993-1995) and co-head writer (2001-2003)

Script writers

- Gary Tomlin; Script writer (2007-2008, 2008); Interim head writer (2008)
- Katherine Schock; Writers' assistant (1998) and Script writer (2000-2003, 2008-?)
- Lisa Seidman; Script writer (2006-2007)
- Michael Slade; Script writer (1997-2002)
- David Smilow; Script writer (1992-1994, 1996)
- Robert W. Soderberg; Script writer (1986-1992)
- Jeffrey Sweet; Script writer (1992-1994)
- Eleanor Timberman; Script Writer (1982-1984)
- Jeff Wilber; Script Writer (2013–present)
- Eleanor Mancusi; Script writer (1991-1993)
- Juliette Mann; Script writer (1991-1993)
- Cassandra Medley; Script writer (1995-1997)
- Tracey Mitchel; Writer's Assistant (1995-1998)
- Frances Myers; Script writer (1992, 2005-2008); Script editor (2005, 2008)
- Lynda Myles; Script Writer (1997-2002)
- Roger Newman; Writer (1991-1992)
- Leslie Nipkow; Script writer (2001-2007) and Script editor (2005-2007)
- Elizabeth Page; Script writer (2007-2008, 2008-2012)
- Jean Passanante; Associate head writer (1993-1996, 1997-1998) and co-head writer (1996-1997)
- Judith Pinsker; Scriptwriter (1993-1999)
- Michael Quinn; Script writer (1995-1998)
- Jessica Klein; Script Writer (2013–present)
- Aida Croal, Script writer (2006, 2007-2008, 2008-2012)
- David A. Levinson; Script writer (2001-2002)
- Sandra Jennings; Script writer (1981-1983)
- John Loprieno; Script writer (2004-2006)
- Michelle Poteet Lisanti; Script writer (2003-2009)
- Neal Bell, Script writer (1994-1998)
- Carole Berlin, Script writer (1984-1986)
- Alan Bernstein, Script writer (1991-1993)
- Jane Atkins, Script writer (1998)
- Bettina F. Bradbury, Script writer (2006)
- Stephanie Braxton, Script writer (1995-1999)
- Ron Carlivati, Writers' Assistant (1996-1998); Script writer (1998-2000); Associate head writer (2000-2007); Co-head writer (2007); Head writer (2007-2008, 2008-2012)
- Craig Carlson, Script writer (1982-1985); Breakdown writer (1985-1990); Co-head writer (1990-1991)
- Ted Sullivan Breakdown writer (1999-2001)
- David Cherrill, Script writer (1993-1997, 2001-2002), Script writer (2003-2004)
- Mark Christopher, Script writer (2005-2007)
- Mike Cohen; Script writer (1994-1996)
- Becky Cole, Script writer (1991-1995)
- Lisa Connor, Script writer (1995-1996)
- Joanna Coons, Script writer (1997-1999)
- Matthew T. Gannon; Writers' Assistant (1990-1996)
- Alan Gelb; Script writer (1992-1994)
- Marisa Gioffre; Script Writer (1977-1982)
- Lloyd Gold; Script writer (1985-1997)
- Stephen Demorest; Script writer (2003-2004)
- Alex Douglas; Script Writer (2013–present)
- Norman Hart; Script writer (1981-1990)
- Matt Hall; Script writer (1981-1984)
- Bill Elverman; Script writer (1982-1984; 1986-1988)
- James Fryman; Script writer (1999-2001)
- Jeanne Marie Ford; Script writer (2007-2008)
- Dorothy Goldstone; Script writer (1991-1994)
- Daniel S. Griffin; Script writer (2003-2005)
- Carolyn Culliton; Script writer (2005-2007); Script editor (2007-2008, 2008-2010)

Breakdown writers

- Tom King; Breakdown writer (1997-2001)
- John Kuntz; Breakdown writer (1997-1999)
- Gillian Spencer; Breakdown writer (1999-2000)

Script editors

- Barbara Esensten; Co-script editor (2004-2005)
- James Harmon Brown, Co-script editor (2004-2005)
- Harding Lemay; Story consultant (1998)

== Casting Directors ==
- Judy Blye Wilson (1988-1991)
- Ellen Novack (1990-1993)
- Sonia Nikore (1995-1997)
- Julie Madison (1999-?)

== Final crew ==
Writers	Producers/Consultants	Directors
Ron Carlivati, Anna Cascio, Aida Croal, Daniel O' Connor, Lorraine Broderick, Elizabeth Page, Katherine Schock, Melissa Salmons, Courtney Simon, Scott Sickles, Chris Van Etten, Jean Passanante.	Frank Valentini (Executive Producer), Suzanne Flynn, John Tumino, Jacqueline Van Belle, Sonia Blangiardo, Brian Frons	Jill Ackles, Larry Carpenter, Danielle Faraldo, Mary Ryan, Bruce S. Cooperman, Richard Manfredi, Jill Mitwell, Gary Donatelli, Frank Valentini, Zetna Fuentes

== Revival crew ==
Season One
Writers	Producers/Consultants	Directors
Thom Racina, Susan Bedsow Horgan, Marin Gazzaniga, Jessica Klein, Michael Slade, Leo Barron, James Mag and Alex Douglas	Jennifer Pepperman (Executive Producer), Jeffrey Kwatinetz (Executive Producer), Richard Frank (Executive Producer), Agnes Nixon (Story Consultant)	Gary Donatelli, Jill Mitwell, Michael Elibaum, Habib Azar, Christopher Goutman and Mary Ryan
