= James Harmon Brown and Barbara Esensten =

American screenwriting duo

James Harmon Brown and Barbara Esensten are American television writers, primarily working on soap operas. The duo worked together for over 20 years, starting on the prime-time serial Dynasty. Together, they created the soap opera The City, a spinoff of Loving. On November 14, 2012, Esensten died at the age of 75.

== Controversy ==
Brown and Esensten tended to drift towards supernatural and science fiction elements in the shows they were hired for. When the two wrote for Guiding Light during the later part of the 1990s, the show's primary heroine, Reva Shayne, was cloned, and when the duo would later write for Port Charles, vampires were introduced, along with other supernatural creatures.

Because of the 2007-2008 Writers Guild of America strike, Brown and Esensten went financial core within the guild, allowing them to write for All My Children because of financial strains brought on by the strike. Megan McTavish, the writer they replaced at All My Children, was displeased. "These are not youngsters struggling to make mortgage payments or feed their children. Their sole intent now seems to be piling up more money for themselves," she said.

== Barbara Esensten ==
Barbara Esensten (née Sills) was born in Los Angeles, California to Rose Fischer and Max Edward Sills. She had an older sister, Phyllis, and a younger brother, Stanley. The family lived in a middle-class neighborhood (now part of Watts, California). Barbara and Stanley attended Woodcrest elementary school, Bret Hart Junior High School, and Washington High School, all of which are in Southern Los Angeles. Barbara graduated with a bachelor's degree in Political Science from UCLA. Most of her adult life, Barbara and her husband Jack, lived in the affluent Palos Verdes, south of Los Angeles. Barbara was an accomplished pianist, an avid reader, and very much loved her family.

== Positions held ==
Dynasty

- Co-Writers: 1987-1988
- Executive Story Editors: 1988-1989

All My Children

- Co-Head Writers: July 26, 2007 - January 14, 2008; January 30 - August 26, 2008
- Script Writers: July 20, 2010 – September 23, 2011

Days of Our Lives

- Script Editors: November 2006 - May 2007

One Life to Live

- Script Editors: October 2004 - June 15, 2005

Port Charles

- Co-Head Writers: November 2000 - July 2003

Guiding Light

- Co-Head Writers: 1997 - 2000

Loving

- Co-Head Writers: 1994 - November 1995

The City

- Creators
- Co-Head Writers: November 1995 - March 1997

The Young and the Restless

- Script Writer: September 19, 2019 – present (Harmon Brown)

== Awards and nominations ==
Daytime Emmy Awards

WINS

- (1993; Best Writing; Guiding Light)
- (2012; Best Writing; Days of Our Lives)

NOMINATIONS

- (1999; Best Writing; Guiding Light)
- (2006, 2009 & 2012; Best Writing; One Life to Live)

Writers Guild of America Award

NOMINATIONS

- (1995, 1996, 1998 & 1999 seasons; Guiding Light)
- (2006 season; One Life to Live)
- (2008 season; All My Children)

Preceded by Addie Walsh; Laurie McCarthy	Head Writer of Loving; Early 1995–November 10, 1995	Succeeded by Show ended
Preceded by none	Head Writer of The City; November 13, 1995 – March 28, 1997	Succeeded by Show ended
Preceded by Michael Conforti; Victor Miller; Nancy Williams Watt	Head Writer of Guiding Light; March 31, 1997 – August 6, 2000	Succeeded by Claire Labine
Preceded by Karen Harris; Barbara Bloom	Head Writer of Port Charles; November 10, 2000 – October 3, 2003	Succeeded by Show ended
Preceded by Megan McTavish (no HW listed before they joined)	Head Writer of All My Children; July 25, 2007 – January 14, 2008	Succeeded by Julie Hanan Carruthers; Brian Frons (WGA Strike)
Preceded by Julie Hanan Carruthers; Brian Frons (WGA Strike)	Head Writer of All My Children; January 31 - August 26, 2008	Succeeded by Charles Pratt Jr.
