= Zach Slater and Kendall Hart =

Zach and Kendall
- Thorsten Kaye and Alicia Minshew as Zach and Kendall
- Duration: 2005–11
- Introduced by: Julie Hanan Carruthers
In-universe information
- Other names: Zendall
- Family: Kane
- Spouse: 2005, 2006–09, 2009–12
- Children: Ian Slater

Zach Slater and Kendall Hart Slater are fictional characters and a supercouple from the American daytime drama All My Children. Zach is portrayed by Thorsten Kaye, and Kendall is portrayed by Alicia Minshew. The couple is often referred to by the portmanteau "Zendall" (for Zach and Kendall) on Internet message boards. Originally scripted by former All My Children head writer Megan McTavish, the couple was never intended to be a serious romance; notable viewer response to the pairing led All My Children writers to reconsider and script them as true loves.

The couple became one of the primary focuses of the show, and their popularity resulted in their being named a top soap opera couple. In 2006, newspaper Chicago Sun-Times took interest in the appeal of Zach and how his romance with Kendall incites jealousy from female viewers abroad. In late 2007, TV Guide Canada named the pairing one of soap opera's best supercouples.

== Background ==
=== Writing ===
In 2005, the writers created character Zach Slater. He was introduced in the "back from the dead" Maria Santos storyline. At the time, the series was focused on Kendall Hart's romantic involvement with Ethan Cambias. Ethan was later revealed as Zach's son. Head writer Megan McTavish had not planned on writing Zach and Kendall as being seriously romantically intertwined; Zach was only supposed to marry Kendall as a temporary "roadblock" in the way of Kendall and Ethan's relationship and later for the coupling of Kendall and her former love, Ryan Lavery. In their Best & Worst December 13, 2005 issue, Soap Opera Digest stated: "We thought the 'Zendall' union was a bump in the Kendall/Ethan road, not its own destination. This enabled Zach and Kendall's growing affection to sneak up and surprise us as much as it did them. When they ended up in love, it felt like a happy accident, not some writer's 'You Will Love This Couple' dictate and on daytime, alas, that's not something you see every day."

== Storyline ==
Zach Slater sues his son, Ethan Cambias, for control of Cambias Industries. Ethan strikes back by having Zach's casino shut down. At this time, Kendall Hart, Ethan's girlfriend, has just broken up with him. Their breakup is due to Kendall being appalled at Ethan's lies during their relationship. Zach takes this opportunity to propose marriage to his son's lover — he propositions Kendall with the deal that they both can get back at Ethan for his betrayal, by marrying each other. Kendall agrees and the two secretly marry. Kendall plots to help Zach regain his gaming licenses. When Ethan finds out that the two have married from Zach's own lips, he lashes out, declaring that Zach is dead to him; he no longer has a father. Zach is alarmed at how deeply he has hurt his son by taking up with Kendall, and offers Kendall her freedom from their marriage arrangement. But Kendall is tired of heartbreak and love causing her pain, reasoning that it's better to be in a loveless marriage than in a loving one full of betrayal. She decides to stay married to Zach after all, and the two grow close in their unexpected friendship.

Zach consoles Kendall while she worries for her best friend, Greenlee Smythe, who is pregnant with Ryan Lavery's child. Kendall has seen Ryan angrily voice that he never wants children, and she fears how Ryan will react to Greenlee's pregnancy. When Greenlee relays to Ryan that they are expecting a child, Ryan goes on an angry rampage, destroying Greenlee's hotel room, and in some time, drives his motorcycle off of a cliff. Everyone presumes Ryan is dead. However, Zach discovers him alive. When Ryan strongly reasons with Zach not to reveal to Greenlee or Kendall, or anyone that he is still alive, Zach agrees, feeling that Ryan's temper is dangerous to Greenlee. He also sees Ryan's need to start fresh, just as he once had.

Zach comes into the knowledge that Kendall agreed to act as the surrogate for Ryan and Greenlee's baby when Greenlee's chances of giving birth became non-existent. He utterly hates the idea, and is determined to ensure Kendall will not go through with it. Once Ryan reveals himself to be alive a little after this, Kendall comes to the shocking realization that her husband helped Ryan fake his death. She is enraged at Zach, and states that she never would have taken on the task of being Greenlee's surrogate if she had known that Ryan is alive. Zach and Kendall fight on and off, but no matter their argumentative nature, Zach has developed true romantic feelings for Kendall. At this point, Greenlee has discovered that Kendall is pregnant not with Greenlee and Ryan's baby, but rather with Kendall and Ryan's baby. She spills this knowledge to the whole town, stating that Kendall has betrayed her in order to produce a child between Ryan and herself. Kendall is embarrassed and heartbroken at Greenlee's accusation, and tries to explain that Greenlee's eggs had been destroyed at implantation time, and if she had not used her own eggs, Greenlee would have been without Ryan's child for certain. Greenlee does not care to listen and soon leaves town. Zach sticks by Kendall's side and tells her of his love for her. Kendall is afraid of his declaration, and starts to distance herself from him. She asks for a divorce, not admitting that she feels the same way. Zach agrees to grant her a divorce, but Bianca Montgomery, Kendall's sister, counsels Zach to not give up on Kendall. Zach does as suggested, and informs Kendall of his love for her again. This time Kendall does not hold back and the two share a passionate kiss.

Zach and Kendall's romance is shot to crumbs when Kendall learns that Zach caused the blackout which spun her in the position of having to carry her own child with Ryan instead of Greenlee's. Zach voices to Kendall that he arranged the blackout to sabotage her chances of surrogacy because he wanted to protect her from a dangerous Ryan. Kendall does not care for Zach's reasons and breaks off her romantic ties to him, just as she is not feeling the maternal instinct. Zach also loses his son, Ethan, to death around this same time, and loses Kendall as well.

He becomes friends with a woman named Dixie Cooney, and when he finds out that Dr. Greg Madden has manipulated her into giving up her child, he warns Kendall of Madden, who happens to be Kendall's OBGYN. Kendall does not listen to Zach at first, but it is not long before Kendall admits that she needs Zach in her life. She tells him that she still loves him, and the two reunite. They are married at sea. This happy reunion does not last long though. Shortly after, Kendall is thrown into a coma after construction materials fall on her, in what is a botched murder attempt by her best friend, JR Chandler, in a drunken effort to kill his wife — Babe. The doctors inform Kendall's loved ones that if they go about the needed procedure to save Kendall's life, it will most likely mean the death of her unborn baby; if the baby is allowed to be born later than sooner, it will kill Kendall. Zach is naturally conflicted. He remembers Kendall's words of wanting the baby to grow up and have a great life, thus Zach painfully chooses Kendall's wishes. He knows she would choose the life of her unborn baby over her own life. He barricades himself in Kendall's hospital room, even occupying a handgun to keep everyone out, except needed doctors, until the baby is born. Spike Lavery enters the world on May 31, 2006, and Kendall later awakes from her coma, now a mother to a beautiful baby boy.

Greg Madden is found dead weeks later. In the months that follow, Zach and Kendall enjoy their time with the newborn child. Problems arise here and there, but none like that of the Satin Slayer, a serial killer murdering the women of Fusion, a cosmetics company run by Kendall and her friends who helped to define it. The Satin Slayer takes Kendall hostage, and when it is revealed that the Satin Slayer is actually Zach's estranged father, Alexander Cambias, Sr., thought to be dead, but obviously still very much alive and that all he wanted is for Zach to have followed in his footsteps, Zach does everything in his power to save Kendall, as it all culminates on a balcony outside of a hotel room. Zach's father sets a contraption around Kendall's neck, which will kill her if its detonator goes off. Zach and Alexander struggle as Zach gets a hold of the detonator and will not let it go, even as he is shot in the arm by Alexander. Zach is able to sneak a spare knife from the sheath at his ankle and throw it hard enough at Alexander so that Alexander drops his gun. Zach rescues Kendall. He is determined to kill his father, but help soon arrives, and Alexander is sent to jail.

There was a part of me that kept saying, gosh I wish Zach and Kendall could have a baby. Now that Kendall is pregnant, I think it is just perfect. She has a child with the man who is and will always be her friend and now she has a child on the way with the love of her life...it is very exciting.

— Alicia Minshew

In early 2007, Kendall is elated to learn that she is pregnant with Zach's child. The two become centered in a peaceful place — until Kendall's former best friend, Greenlee, returns to Pine Valley and soon attempts to kidnap Kendall's son, Spike, feeling that the little boy should have been hers in the first place. While attempting to kidnap Spike, Greenlee changes her mind and feels that it is wrong; however, she is in a car accident, as Spike is with her, which contributes significantly to Kendall going into premature labor once she finds out what Greenlee has done. Zach and Kendall endure an agonizing time of worrying about the health of two sons. Kendall gives birth to a baby boy named Ian Slater, born July 26, 2007, premature. On August 6, 2007, it is revealed that Spike is deaf due to the car accident with Greenlee. Kendall bans Greenlee from her life, but later pretends to be her friend in an elaborate scheme of revenge against her.

In 2008, when Kendall discovers that Greenlee is not responsible for Spike being deaf after all, she feels great remorse for having exacted revenge against her. Soon, Greenlee and Zach go missing. After searching for the pair for weeks, Kendall and Aidan Devane (Greenlee's boyfriend) believe them to be dead. The two have sex during their grief. Afterwards, however, they discover their lovers alive. Overjoyed by this turn of events but also full of dread due to fear of their night together being revealed, Kendall and Aidan try to get back the sense of normalcy they had before. But matters become more complicated when Kendall finds out that she may be pregnant, and unsure of who the father is — Zach or Aidan. She takes a pregnancy test and is relieved when the test result is negative. She struggles to keep her conscience clear regarding her night with Aidan, however. Eventually, she reveals to Zach that she and Aidan had sex. Zach, who had already suspected (and knew) after putting "clues" together, has a difficult time accepting it at first, but soon forgives her. Zach and Kendall try to move on with their lives, all the while keeping Kendall and Aidan's tryst a secret from Greenlee.

Greenlee and Aidan become engaged and want to move up their wedding date to June and not waste another moment. However, during Jesse Hubbard and Angie Baxter's wedding, Greenlee finds out from her father about Aidan and Kendall's one-night stand. She silently keeps quiet until deciding the perfect moment to reveal to Aidan and Kendall that she knows. She refuses to accept the given explanation. While Kendall tries to once again mend her friendship with Greenlee, Zach and Kendall seem to emerge as a stronger couple.

Later in the year, Zach and Kendall start to have problems. These issues are mostly due to Kendall interfering in the affairs of Ryan, Annie Lavery, Greenlee, Aidan, and Josh Madden (Kendall's thought to be aborted half-brother).

On October 17, 2008, Zach is in the process of looking for Kendall buried under rubble due to a tornado having just struck Pine Valley. He finds Bianca instead, and is surprised to see that she is pregnant. He later finds an unconscious Kendall. As an ambulance arrives for her, it is stated that there is not enough room for Bianca and Zach to ride along to the hospital. There is, however, enough room for Zach and Kendall's children to ride in the front seat of the ambulance. Zach and Bianca stay behind and discuss Kendall's fate. They also discuss Bianca's secret that she is pregnant with Zach's child via sperm donation, and Bianca's new lover named Reese. Zach had agreed to father Bianca's child for the couple, but did not know that she had gone through with the procedure of artificial insemination, until now. The two wonder how Kendall, who is unaware of this pregnancy, will react to the news when they tell her. As Zach and Bianca continue to talk, Bianca goes into labor. Zach helps deliver the new child into the world.

On January 30, 2009, Kendall awakes and reunites with her husband, almost immediately finding out that he is the father of her new niece. Kendall at first seems okay with it, but secretly she is furious. In February, Greenlee is in a serious accident when Kendall driving on the wrong side of the road and arguing with Zach, drives her off the road she's presumed dead, leaving Kendall devastated. Problems in the Slater marriage become even worse and Kendall turns to Ryan again for comfort and they sleep together.

In March 2009, Zach, no longer able to bear Kendall's changed personality, leaves her and becomes even more focused on his friendship with Reese Williams (in which he had earlier engaged in a kiss). Meanwhile, Kendall declares she never stopped loving Ryan, and Zach serves her with divorce papers and tells her their marriage is over. On April 14, 2009, Kendall decides to start over with Ryan again and her divorce from Zach is finalized.

In May 2009, Ian becomes extremely ill with a heart condition and Zach and Kendall slowly began to grow closer. Soon after they hear that Ian will pull through, Zach and Kendall share a kiss, a kiss neither one is prepared for or willing to talk about afterward. On June 16, 2009, Kendall breaks up with Ryan, stating that she must provide the most loving home possible for her children with Zach.

Kendall is currently the suspect in the death of Stuart Chandler. Zach and Kendall find a loophole so that they will not have to testify against each other by getting married on June 3, 2009. All of Kendall's loved ones try to help her prove her innocence.

Not able to live with the guilt anymore and with encouragement from Stuart's ghost, Kendall refuses to bargain and confesses to the murder, being sentenced to live in prison. Zach is able to get Kendall out of prison by paying a Kendall lookalike a large sum of money (according to Jesse) in order to pose as her in prison. He is able to give Kendall a room in the house where she is to remain, not to come out for any reason, even to check on Ian and Spike. When asking Zach why she cannot stay in his room with him, Kendall concludes that it is because she slept with Ryan and that Zach has not forgiven her, which he confirms. He tells her that he will not forgive anyone anymore, not even Kendall. He does tell her that she is his wife and that he will protect her and his children no matter what.

Aidan and Kendall run away after the Kendall lookalike is admitted to the hospital and Zach's plan falls apart. Eventually, Adam Chandler is revealed as the real culprit behind Stuart's murder, and Kendall is cleared. Just when she's about to return home, Aidan drugs and kidnaps her. Aidan drives a wedge between Zach and Kendall, intending to win Kendall back. Eventually, Zach realizes that something suspicious is happening with Aidan, and follows him to investigate. He manages to rescue Kendall and subdue Aidan, who is sent to prison. Zach and Kendall have trouble getting home, but they eventually get a miracle and are home in time for Christmas to spend with Spike and Ian. They decide to leave Pine Valley and make a fresh start elsewhere in the end of 2009.

In March 2010, Kendall finds out Greenlee is alive when she shows up in Spain, where she and Zach are staying. Greenlee accuses Kendall of trying to kill her to get Ryan to herself. Kendall denies this, but Greenlee refuses to hear this and leaves, not forgiving Kendall. In August 2010, Kendall comes back when Ryan is admitted to the hospital. She finds out Ryan is faking his prognosis because Greenlee, who is now married to David Hayward, is in trouble. Kendall initially doesn't want to get involved, but eventually decides to help Greenlee. Zach is close on her trail, and lets Kendall know he just wants her to be happy.

David drops dead at a party in September 2010, and both Ryan and Greenlee become suspects in his murder. While Greenlee is on trial for his murder, Zach returns, and hears about David's murder and the evidence Kendall and Greenlee discovered against Ryan. The three of them try to figure out the truth behind who killed David.

== Reception and impact ==
Zach and Kendall's romance intrigued newspaper Chicago Sun-Times in 2006. In their October 30, 2006 issue, the newspaper revealed that a significant portion of their female readers wanted to "literally trade places" with Kendall so that they could have Zach. The article was dedicated to which guys on television "make their readers swoon" — and inspires them to go through perplexing lengths in order to catch them on television. Thorsten Kaye, Zach's portrayer, was their #1 vote getter, and beat out runner-ups such as "McDreamy" Patrick Dempsey.

In their November 21, 2006 issue, Soap Opera Digest named the Zach and Kendall pairing "Zen Paradise" due to the "overwhelming calm" their fans get from watching them onscreen together. The demand for more screentime and better storylines for the couple led Soap Opera Weekly to feature the couple on their cover; they reported the story first when All My Children finally gave into their "very vocal" Zach and Kendall audience. Underneath the image of Zach and Kendall, Soap Opera Weekly titled it "Exclusive At Last! AMC finally gives fans the story they want."

Zach and Kendall were titled a supercouple two years into their union, when, generally, modern-day soap opera pairings are rarely titled such. TV Guide summed up their take on the couple's intrigue, stating that Zach finally taught Kendall she had a heart and deserved love. "Nothing’s sexier when Zendall argue and bicker, except, well, when they enjoy makeup sex," the magazine elaborated.

== See also ==
- List of supercouples
