= Lisa Connor =

Lisa Connor is an American soap opera writer, producer, and director. She is a writer on the ABC Daytime and The Online Network serial drama All My Children.

In 2020 she was one of the recruits for a fiction app named "Radish" which had $63m of funding and it was opening an office in LA. The soap writers recruited included Janet Iacobuzio, Addie Walsh, Leah Laiman, and Jean Passanante.

== Positions held ==
All My Children

- Co-Head Writer: May 29, 2013 - September 2013 (hired by Prospect Park)
- Script Editor: Jan 29, 2013 - September 2013 (hired by Ginger Smith)
- Script Writer: May 3, 2010 - December 2010 (hired by Lorraine Broderick)
- Breakdown Writer: April 2002 - January 5, 2005; January 6, 2011 - September 23, 2011 (hired by Richard Culliton)
- Supervising Producer: 1999 - March 2002 (hired by Jean Dadario Burke)

As the World Turns

- Script Writer: June 30, 2008 - December 2008
- Breakdown Writer: 1997 - 1999; March 3, 2005 - January 24, 2008; April 18, 2008 - June 27, 2008

Days of Our Lives

- Breakdown Writer: May 22, 2012 - August 13, 2012
- Script Writer: September 26, 2016 – present

General Hospital

- Occasional Script Writer: October 20, 2011; December 6, 2011; December 8, 2011
- Occasional Breakdown Writer: January 6, 2012

Guiding Light

- Script Writer: 1994
- Associate Director: 1992 - 1994
- Production Coordinator: 1980s

One Life to Live (hired by Michael Malone)

- Script Writer: 1995 - 1996

The Young and the Restless (hired by Maria Arena Bell and Hogan Sheffer)

- Script Writer (April 30, 2009 - March 25, 2010)
- Breakdown Writer (March 30, 2009 - August 4, 2009)

== Awards and nominations ==
Daytime Emmy Awards

Nominations

- 2003–2004, 2006: Best Writing, As The World Turns
- 2001 & 2002: Best Drama Series, All My Children
- 2000: Best Writing, As The World Turns
- 1996: Best Writing, One Life To Live
- 1993: Best Directing;, Guiding Light

Wins

- 1994: Best Directing, Guiding Light

Writers Guild of America Award

Nominations

- 1997, 1998, 2005 & 2006 seasons: As The World Turns

Wins

- 2003 season: All My Children
