= Addie Walsh =

American television soap opera writer (born 1953)

Addie Walsh (born 1953) is an American television soap opera writer. She last wrote for All My Children. She now writes independently.

== Life ==
Walsh graduated from Smith College where she was a student of Len Berkman.

Her one-woman show, That's All I Got, received an award at the United Solo Festival in 2014, in New York City.

In 2020, she was one of the recruits for a fiction app named "Radish" which had $63,000,000 of funding and it was opening an office in LA. The soap writers recruited included Walsh, Janet Iacobuzio, Lisa Connor, Leah Laiman, and Jean Passanante.

Walsh is also an actor, and has acted in the play "Three Tall Women".

== Filmography ==
Walsh's roles
Year	Title	Role	Notes	Ref.
1982	Texas	Breakdown writer		
1983–1986	Guiding Light	Associate head writer	Hired by Pamela K. Long	
1986	Search for Tomorrow	Co-head writer		
1987–1991	One Life to Live	Associate head writer		
1990–91	Riviera	Creator		
1991–92	Loving	Head writer	Resigned in 1992 after dispute with executive producer Haidee Granger	
1993	Guiding Light	Associate head writer		
1994	Loving	Co-head writer	Rehired by Josie Emmerich in 1994 and paired with Laurie McCarthy	
1995–99	As the World Turns	Associate head writer		
1997	As the World Turns	Co-head writer		
2000–11	All My Children	Associate head writer	Position held April 17, 2000 – April 19, 2002; July 1, 2003 – January 14, 2008 (hired by Megan McTavish); and March 19, 2008 – September 23, 2011	
1999 – 2000	Days of Our Lives	Associate head writer	November 11, 1999 – 2000 (hired by Sally Sussman Morina)	
2002–2003	Days of Our Lives	Associate head writer		

== Awards and nominations ==
Awards for Walsh's writing
Year	Title	Award	Result	Ref.
1985	Guiding Light	Writers Guild of America Award for Television: Daytime Serials	Nominee	
1985	Guiding Light	Daytime Emmy Award for Best Writing	Nominee	
1986	Guiding Light	Daytime Emmy Award for Best Writing	Winner	
1986	Guiding Light	Writers Guild of America Award for Television: Daytime Serials	Nominee	
1990	One Life to Live	Daytime Emmy Award for Best Writing	Nominee	
1994	Loving	Writers Guild of America Award for Television: Daytime Serials	Winner	
1996	As the World Turns	Daytime Emmy Award for Best Writing	Nominee	
1998	As the World Turns	Writers Guild of America Award for Television: Daytime Serials	Nominee	
1999	As the World Turns	Writers Guild of America Award for Television: Daytime Serials	Nominee	
2000	As the World Turns	Daytime Emmy Award for Best Writing	Nominee	
2001	All My Children	Daytime Emmy Award for Best Writing	Nominee	
2001	All My Children	Writers Guild of America Award for Television: Daytime Serials	Winner	
2002	All My Children	Daytime Emmy Award for Best Writing	Nominee	
2002	All My Children	Writers Guild of America Award for Television: Daytime Serials	Winner	
2003	All My Children	Daytime Emmy Award for Best Writing	Nominee	
2004	All My Children	Daytime Emmy Award for Best Writing	Nominee	
2004	All My Children	Writers Guild of America Award for Television: Daytime Serials	Winner	
2007	All My Children	Writers Guild of America Award for Television: Daytime Serials	Nominee	
2008	All My Children	Writers Guild of America Award for Television: Daytime Serials	Nominee	
2009	All My Children	Daytime Emmy Award for Best Writing	Nominee	
2009	All My Children	Writers Guild of America Award for Television: Daytime Serials	Nominee	
2010	All My Children	Daytime Emmy Award for Best Writing	Nominee	
2010	All My Children	Writers Guild of America Award for Television: Daytime Serials	Nominee	
2012	All My Children	Daytime Emmy Award for Best Writing	Nominee	
2012	All My Children	Writers Guild of America Award for Television: Daytime Serials	Nominee	

== Head writing tenure ==
Preceded by Gary Tomlin	head writer of Search for Tomorrow (with Pamela K. Long); 1986	Succeeded by Show Canceled
Preceded by Mary Ryan Munisteri	head writer of Loving; January 10, 1992-January 15, 1992	Succeeded by Millee Taggart; Robert Guza Jr.
Preceded by Agnes Nixon	head writer of Loving (with Laurie McCarthy); September 5, 1994-February 17, 1995	Succeeded by James Harmon Brown and Barbara Esensten
Preceded by Stephen Black; Henry Stern	head writer of As the World Turns (with Mel Brez and Stephen Demorest); December 16, 1996 – May 16, 1997	Succeeded by Jessica D. Klein
Preceded by Jessica D. Klein	head writer of As the World Turns (with Mel Brez and Stephen Demorest: October 28 – December 19, 1997) (with Lorraine Broderick and Hal Corley: February 23, 1998 – June 25, 1999); October 28, 1997 – June 25, 1999	Succeeded by Leah Laiman and Carolyn Culliton
