= All My Children =

American television soap opera

- Also known as: AMC
- Genre: Soap opera
- Created by: Agnes Nixon
- Written by: Various
- Starring: Series cast
- Country of origin: United States
- Original language: English
- No. of episodes: ABC: 10,712 (television); TOLN: 43 (internet and television); Total: 10,755

Production
- Executive producer: Various
- Camera setup: Multiple-camera setup
- Running time: 30 minutes (1970–1977); 60 minutes (1977–2011); 21–27 minutes (2013)
- Production companies: Creative Horizons, Inc. (1970–1975); ABC (1975–2011); Prospect Park (2013)

Original release
- Network: ABC
- Release: January 5, 1970 – September 23, 2011
- Network: The Online Network
- Release: April 29 – September 2, 2013

Related
- The City; General Hospital; Loving; One Life to Live

All My Children (often shortened to AMC) is an American television soap opera that aired on ABC from January 5, 1970, to September 23, 2011, and on The Online Network (TOLN) from April 29 to September 2, 2013, via Hulu, Hulu Plus, and iTunes.

Created by Agnes Nixon, All My Children is set in Pine Valley, Pennsylvania, a fictional suburb of Philadelphia, which is modeled on the actual Philadelphia suburb of Penn Valley. The original series featured Susan Lucci as Erica Kane, one of daytime television's most popular characters. All My Children was the first new network daytime drama to debut in the 1970s. Originally owned by Creative Horizons, Inc., the company created by Nixon and her husband, Bob, the show was sold to ABC in January 1970. The series started with half-hour episodes before expanding to a full hour on April 25, 1977. The show had experimented with the full-hour format for one week starting on June 30, 1975, after which Ryan's Hope premiered.

From 1970 to 1990, All My Children was recorded at ABC's TV18 at 101 West 67th Street, now a 50-story apartment tower. From March 1990 to December 2009, it was taped at ABC's Studio TV23 at 320 West 66th Street in Manhattan, New York City, New York. In December 2009, taping moved from Manhattan to less costly Los Angeles, California, at Stages 1 and 2 of the Andrita Studios, from 2010 to 2011. Taping then moved to the Connecticut Film Center in Stamford, Connecticut. All My Children started taping in high definition on January 4, 2010, and began airing in high definition on February 3, 2010. All My Children became the third soap opera to be produced and broadcast in high definition.

At one point, the program's popularity positioned it as the most widely recorded television show in the United States. In the mid-1970s, its audience was estimated to be 30% male, which was unusual at the time. The show ranked first in the daytime Nielsen ratings in the 1978–79 season. Throughout most of the 1980s and into the early 1990s, All My Children was the number-two daytime soap opera on the air. However, like the rest of the soap operas in the United States, All My Children experienced unprecedented declines in its ratings during the 2000s. By 2010, it had become one of the least-watched soap operas in daytime television.

On April 14, 2011, ABC announced that it was canceling All My Children after a run of 41 years. On July 7, 2011, ABC sold the licensing rights of All My Children to third-party production company Prospect Park with the show set to continue on the Internet as a series of webisodes. The series aired its final episode on ABC on September 23, 2011. On November 23, 2011, Prospect Park suspended its plan to revive the series, due to lack of funding and unsuccessful negotiation with the union organizations representing the actors and crews.

On January 7, 2013, Prospect Park officially brought back its project to restore All My Children as a web series on a platform named TOLN. The revival series would premiere on April 29, 2013. However, the new series faced several behind-the-scene obstacles throughout its run. On November 11, 2013, several All My Children cast members announced that Prospect Park had closed production and canceled the series again. The rights to the show returned to ABC in December 2016.

== History ==
=== Origins ===
Agnes Nixon, then head writer for The Guiding Light, first came up with the idea for All My Children in the 1960s. When writing the story bible, she designed the show as a light-hearted soap opera that focused on social issues and young love. She unsuccessfully attempted to sell the series to NBC, then to CBS, and once again to NBC through Procter & Gamble. When Procter & Gamble was unable to make room for the show in its lineup, Nixon put All My Children on hold.

Nixon became head writer for Another World in 1965, and decided to use a few ideas from her All My Children bible. In particular, she used the model of the Erica Kane character to create a brand new Another World character named Rachel Davis. Nixon said Rachel was Erica's "precursor to the public ... [What] Erica and Rachel have in common is they thought if they could get their dream, they'd be satisfied... But that dream has been elusive", Nixon said.

=== Creation ===
ABC later approached Nixon to create a show that would reflect a more contemporary tone. That program, One Life to Live, debuted in 1968. After the show became a success, the network asked Nixon for another program, and she revived her All My Children bible and the Erica Kane character.

Nixon wrote a poem to include in the photo album shown in the series' title credits: "The great and the least, the rich and the poor, the weak and the strong, in sickness and in health, in joy and sorrow, in tragedy and triumph, you are all my children."

=== 1970s ===
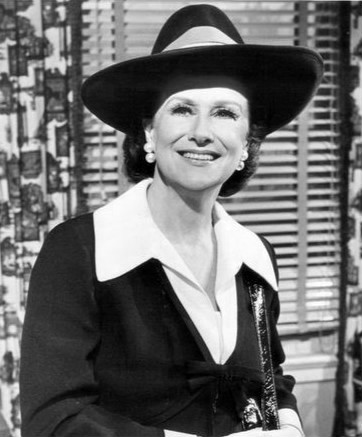
Ruth Warrick as Phoebe Tyler

All My Children debuted on January 5, 1970, replacing the canceled game show Dream House. Rosemary Prinz was signed on to be the "special guest star" for six months, playing the role of political activist Amy Tyler. Prinz was well known for her role of Penny Hughes on As the World Turns in the 1950s and 1960s, and she was added to the show to give it an initial boost due to her name value. From 1970 and into the 1980s, the show was either written by Nixon herself or by her protégé, Wisner Washam. He was groomed by Nixon to eventually take over the reins in the 1980s while she focused on other endeavors, which included creating and launching Loving in 1983.

Nixon strove to create a soap opera that was topical and could illustrate social issues for the audience. She wanted this and a combination of regular humor for the series. To keep the action more real, she allowed the audience to locate her fictional "Pine Valley" on a map: situated a mere hour-long train ride from New York City. Many believed Pine Valley was in New York because of a town called Pine Valley in western New York. However, it was not until the 1980s that it was finally revealed that Pine Valley is actually in Pennsylvania, near Philadelphia and also near One Life to Live's Llanview. (Nixon reportedly modeled the town on Rosemont, an actual suburb of Philadelphia.)

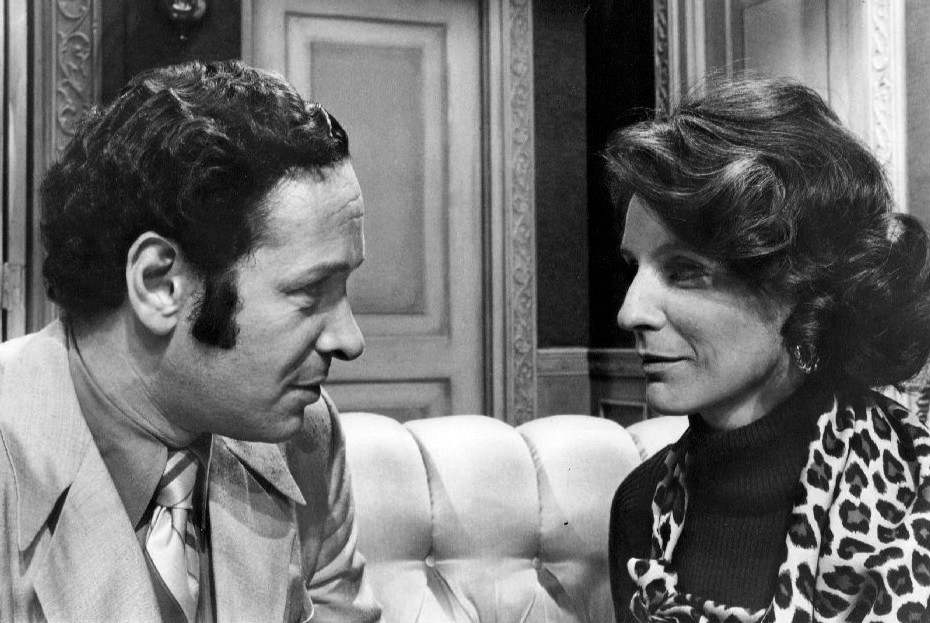
Nick Davis (Larry Keith) and Anne Tyler Davis Martin (Joanna Miles)

The show's first action takes place around several families and characters. Phoebe Tyler (Ruth Warrick), who fashions herself as "Queen of Pine Valley", was the paradigm of a rich snob when she is introduced. A divorced mother, Mona Kane (Frances Heflin), and her spoiled daughter, Erica (Susan Lucci) were also introduced. Contrasting this was the stable Martin family, headed by patriarch Joe and later (after the death of her husband, Ted Brent) by matriarch Ruth, who became a symbolic foundation of All My Children. Destined to break up the young romance of classmates Tara Martin (Karen Lynn Gorney) and Phil Brent (Richard Hatch), Erica learned that Phil was not the son of Ruth and Ted, but instead, the son of Ruth's sister, Amy Tyler (Rosemary Prinz) and her mother's friend, Nick Davis. In a selfish attempt to break up Phil and Tara, she told everyone the truth.

All My Children's first success was its focus on young love. ABC wanted a soap opera that would bring in young viewers, and slowly the program was accomplishing that. The show's ratings did not start out strong, however. In its first year on the air, it ranked No. 17 out of 19 soap operas. Despite this, its audience grew with each passing year.

The show was unique for its use of the Vietnam War. Before All My Children debuted, no show had discussed the war in any depth. There were traditional Phoebe and free-spirited Amy both butting heads over the war, with Amy often leading protests around Pine Valley. When Amy left, Ruth takes over as the anti-war voice and protests against the war in the early 1970s. The character's protest speech in 1972 won Mary Fickett the first Emmy Award given to a soap opera performer. Later in the show's run, Phoebe softened.

Nurse Caroline Murray, played by Patricia Dixon, was a Vietnam veteran who overcame her chilling flashbacks to the war with the help of Dr. Frank Grant (John Danelle) in 1976. Dr. Frank Grant, first seen in Pine Valley in 1972, his wife Nancy (played by Lisa Wilkinson and first seen in 1973), and Caroline (debuting in 1976) were the first Black leading characters on All My Children.

In May 1972, the character of Erica Kane Martin became the first television character to undergo a legal abortion. Making the abortion particularly controversial is Erica's reason for doing it, not because of her jeopardized health, but rather because she did not want to gain weight and lose her modeling job. The abortion story received much media attention, especially since it preceded the Roe vs. Wade decision by nearly a year. Within the story, Erica developed a potentially fatal infection after having the abortion, and the switchboards at ABC lit up with calls from doctors and nurses, offering their medical opinions on how best to treat the character's case. The storyline has been credited for boosting the show's ratings, as well as helping establish Erica Kane as a central character who would dominate the show for its entire run.

Phoebe's husband Charles (Hugh Franklin) became close to Mona (Erica's mother and his secretary at the hospital). The two fell in love and Charles divorced Phoebe, even though she tried to blackmail Mona and even faked paralysis. In the end, Phoebe was left a drunken divorcée and Mona becomes the new Mrs. Tyler. This ordeal starts the long-time Phoebe/Mona rivalry.

When Eileen Letchworth, who portrayed Margo Flax Martin, contemplated a facelift, she talked it over with Nixon. Not only was Letchworth going to need time off, she was going to look significantly different when she returned to the show. Nixon approved and worked the facelift into a storyline. Margo wanted to impress the somewhat younger Paul Martin (William Mooney). Margo's facelift in 1974 became one of the first major storylines on television discussing plastic surgery and its psychological effects.

In June 1976, character Brooke English showed up on her Aunt Phoebe's doorstep and soon clashed with Erica over Tom Cudahy and Mark Dalton. In 1976, when Kitty Shea Tyler was searching for her natural mother, the show introduced Myrtle Lum Fargate (Eileen Herlie).

By the late 1970s, the show had risen to the top of the ratings. One reason for the rise was the arrival of teenage prostitute Donna Beck (Candice Earley). Her relationship with the handsome Dr. Chuck Tyler breathed life into the show and captivated fans. Other new additions are the arrivals of aristocratic Palmer Cortlandt (aka Peter Cooney) (James Mitchell), his somewhat creepy housekeeper Myra Murdock (Elizabeth Lawrence), and his overprotected daughter Nina (Taylor Miller), who, to Palmer's chagrin, entrances Dr. Cliff Warner (Peter Bergman). Palmer does everything in his power to break up the couple, including telling Nina she is going blind due to her diabetes. Palmer teams up with Cliff's past flame, nurse Sybil Thorne (Linda Gibboney), who confronts Cliff about fathering her son, but this is temporary; Sybil is murdered and Cliff is arrested for the crime, which actually was committed by Sean Cudahy (Alan Dysert). During the murder trial, Nina is astonished to learn that her mother, Daisy Cortlandt (Gillian Spencer), whom she believes to be dead, is, in fact, alive and living in Pine Valley as Monique Jonvil. To everyone's complete shock, Myra acknowledges that Daisy is her daughter. All My Children also found memorable villains in Billy Clyde Tuggle (Matthew Cowles) and Ray Gardner (Gil Rogers).

All My Children had always aired in color since its 1970 debut. The episodes were initially only saved for a short time on cartridge tapes and were eventually erased in order to tape other productions. Beginning in 1976, all the episodes were saved on cartridge tape and then digitally since the late 1990s. A few early episodes were saved on kinescope in black and white, one of which aired on ABC in 1997 on a special "A Daytime To Remember", which showcased all TV shows that aired on ABC Daytime. But there are no known pre-1976 episodes to be still in existence on tape.

Nixon personally owned all the early episodes on monochromatic kinescopes. When ABC purchased the rights to All My Children in 1975, it also received the kinescopes from Nixon with a promise that the network would archive them. However, that promise was broken, because different sources point out that most of them were either lost in a warehouse fire or were erased. As mentioned above, a few early episodes survive.

=== 1980s ===
The early 1980s is considered a "golden period" for the show and the "Golden Age" for supercouples. Younger characters, such as Greg Nelson and Jenny Gardner (Laurence Lau and Kim Delaney), Liza Colby (Marcy Walker), Liza's best friend Amanda (Amanda Bearse), Jesse Hubbard and Angie Baxter (Darnell Williams and Debbi Morgan), and a now-grown-up Tad Martin (Michael E. Knight), who was now legally Ruth and Joe's son, enter the scene.

The storyline involving Liza plotting to win Greg back after he leaves her for Jenny became a fan favorite, as was the Greg and Jenny and Jesse and Angie pairings. Jesse and Jenny's summer in New York City became regarded as one of the greatest storylines in the history of the series. Meanwhile, the legend of "Tad the Cad" is born when Tad takes Liza's virginity, then simultaneously begins having sex with her mother, socialite Marian Colby (Jennifer Bassey), who eventually is sent to prison.

For older appeal, Jenny and Tad's natural mother Opal (Dorothy Lyman) was also added to the canvas, where she opens the Glamorama salon and spa. Opal greatly showcased All My Children's attempt at humor and satire. Also introduced in the 1980s were powerful businessman Adam Chandler and his identical twin brother Stuart (both played by David Canary), the first arrival of members of the Chandler family. Adam became cited as one of the "most powerful male figures in television", which was contrasted by Stuart's kind, generous, and honest personality.

Erica began to take on a larger-than-life role by the 1980s, writing an autobiography, Raising Kane, and turning it into a motion picture. When her presumed half-sister Silver (Deborah Goodrich) accuses Erica of murdering Kent Bogard (Michael Woods, Lee Godart), her former lover and boss, Erica goes on the run. She does all this while posing as a sister named 'Christine'.

The show made its first attempt at tackling the taboo topic of homosexuality in 1983. Tricia Pursley portrayed the divorced Devon McFadden, who believes she is falling in love with her lesbian psychiatrist, Lynn Carson (portrayed by Donna Pescow). Lynn acknowledges that she is a lesbian, and Devon admits her crush, but Lynn rebuffs her. Before this storyline, no other American soap opera had done a story about homosexuality.

The show tackled the issue of drug use when Mark La Mura's character, Mark Dalton, becomes addicted to cocaine after years of casual use. His half-sister, Erica, stages an intervention with his friends to have him confront his problems. They practice a tough love policy that requires Mark's admission of his addiction.

Controversy was prompted in 1987 with the arrival of Cindy Parker (Ellen Wheeler), who later fell in love with Stuart. Cindy was revealed to have AIDS. Through visits by now-Dr. Angie Hubbard, the show educated the public on how the disease was spread and how to prevent it. Cindy had contracted HIV from her husband, Fred, played by Mark Morrison, who contracted it from sharing needles for drug use. Cindy is attacked by a vigilante hate group led by her niece, Skye Chandler. Cindy marries Stuart and he adopts her son, Scott. She dies early in 1989 in one of the show's most-watched episodes.

Felicia Minei Behr was hired as the new executive producer in early 1989. Having been a producer on Ryan's Hope, Behr was familiar with All My Children, having been an associate producer from 1970 to 1975. Among the stories featured was a baby storyline involving the characters of Adam, Brooke, Tad, and Dixie (Cady McClain). By this time, the show had also found a "hit couple" in Cecily and Nico (portrayed by Rosa Nevin and Maurice Benard), but Behr was unable to convince either to remain with the show, and the duo left at the end of 1989.

ABC was pleased with Behr; Nixon was as well, and decided her creation was safe in the hands of the new producer. Behr, however, made the unpopular decision to fire Peter Bergman (Cliff Warner) during this time, as well as Ellen Wheeler (Karen) and Robert Gentry (Ross Chandler). Bergman's departure was particularly frustrating to Debbi Morgan (who thought it was a cop-out by ABC on the promising interracial Angie/Cliff pairing; Morgan later defected to the new NBC soap opera Generations in protest), Taylor Miller (who was misled when Behr approached her to bring back her character Nina; Miller was frustrated to find out she had only been brought back for two weeks to facilitate Bergman's departure: Cliff and Nina reunited, married yet again, and left Pine Valley, leaving Miller to lament to Soap Opera Digest that she felt it was going backward for both characters, and difficult emotionally to play), and Bergman himself. Behr then brought back fan favorite Opal Gardner, but instead of contacting Emmy winner Dorothy Lyman to reprise the role, Behr hired Jill Larson. Lyman later noted her disappointment in never being contacted about reprising the role.

=== 1990s ===
At the time of Behr's hiring in early 1989, the show usually ranked around No. 4 in the ratings. By 1990, Nixon returned as head writer, teaming with co-head writers Lorraine Broderick & Wisner Washam. Ratings inched up to the No. 3 spot with stories such as Molly's leukemia, Ceara Connor's (Genie Francis') incest, and Mona's lung cancer, all praised in soap opera magazines for their social conscience. A high point of 1991 was the introduction of Janet Green, leading to Natalie in the Well. In mid-1992 ABC promoted Megan McTavish, a former actress who had been on the writing team since 1987, to head writer, with Nixon serving as executive head writer. Hilights of her stories include the Who Killed Will Cortlandt? mystery, Willow Lake Acres (a humorous-but-serious tale about the plight of the elderly in a fraudulent nursing home), and a tornado that rocked Pine Valley.

McTavish was also instrumental in a major, but popular retroactive continuity (retcon) storyline in 1993. Shortly after being introduced, Kendall Hart (Sarah Michelle Gellar) was revealed as Erica's long-lost daughter. Kendall was conceived after Erica was raped on her 14th birthday by her father's actor friend Richard Fields. After she became pregnant, Erica gave her baby up for adoption. Kendall comes to Pine Valley after finding out her birth mother is the famous Erica Kane. Kendall longs for Erica's approval but is also angry over her perceived feelings of being 'abandoned' at birth and seeks revenge against her mother. Although they try to make their family work at first, Kendall acts out and mother and daughter experience a painful, strained, and complicated relationship during this time in the series. Gellar was proclaimed by some "as the second coming of Erica" in her two years as Kendall Hart from 1993 to 1995, but left the show to pursue other acting opportunities.

The Santos, Dillon, Frye, and Keefer families were also introduced, and the Tad and Dixie pairing had become especially popular. Other prominent couples were Dimitri and Erica (Michael Nader), Trevor (James Kiberd) and Natalie (Kate Collins), Hayley (Kelly Ripa) and Brian (Gregory Gordon, Matt Borlenghi, Brian L. Greene), and Brooke English and Edmund Grey (Julia Barr, John Callahan).

Some of McTavish's storytelling ultimately received criticism for being gimmick-driven (i.e. multiple dual roles, bomb plots). Reports soon surfaced that Behr and McTavish were having conflicts about storylines and the direction of the series. After the O. J. Simpson trial preempted daytime television programs throughout late 1994 and into 1995, many soaps saw their ratings decline, and All My Children was no different. When McTavish was fired from her head writing post in the spring, former head writer Lorraine Broderick was tapped by Behr to lead the team once again.

Broderick's tenure under Behr was popular among critics and fans for returning All My Children to its socially relevant, character-driven roots. Her most significant successes were Erica's drug addiction story (with the character receiving treatment at the Betty Ford Center), and also the story of homophobia over a gay high school boy and a history teacher. However, with the ratings still stagnant, ABC did not renew longtime executive producer Felicia Minei Behr's contract, and brought in Francesca James (who had previously won an Emmy award acting on the show as twins Kitty and Kelly). James sought to innovate production style and push boundaries with storylines, which now included a voodoo arc with the popular Noah and Julia (Keith Hamilton Cobb and Sydney Penny), a fantasy story for Myrtle featuring the "real" Santa Claus, and finally a baby kidnapping story involving Erica.

Despite winning three consecutive Daytime Emmys for writing during her tenure on All My Children, Broderick was replaced in December 1997 by her predecessor, McTavish. The first major story McTavish tackled, Bianca Montgomery's anorexia, was created by Broderick. Apart from the anorexia story, McTavish's tales were plot-driven and made implausible alterations to the show's history such as the resurrection of Erica's lifetime love, Mike Roy (Nicholas Surovy). In 1998, the show again got a new executive producer, Jean Dadario Burke, taking over from Francesca James.

Cady McClain, who had left the show as Dixie in 1996, returned, but other storylines—involving ghosts, poison tattoos, Nazi art, and a sperm switch—were all ill-received. By the start of 1999, with All My Children being voted as the "Worst of 1998" by Soap Opera Digest, McTavish was once again fired. As ratings began to fall, ABC convinced Nixon to make a limited return.

=== 2000s ===
Nixon decided to write a story that would rejuvenate the show and be socially relevant at the same time. This resulted in the series revealing Erica's daughter Bianca as a lesbian. Within the series, Bianca admits the truth to her mother in December 2000. Although initially controversial, the storyline was praised by fans and critics. Bianca emerged as a breakout character and lesbian icon. The show found additional success in the pairing of newcomers Leo and Greenlee (Josh Duhamel and Rebecca Budig).

Richard Culliton wrote several of All My Children's early 2000s (decade) storylines. He created popular characters Frankie and Maggie Stone, and said Frankie was already intended to be killed in a murder storyline after only three months on the series. Culliton and ABC executives were surprised when viewers became attached to the romance between Bianca and Frankie, developed by Culliton with Frankie's debut. These fans attributed Frankie's death to the show's fear to focus on a lesbian romance. Eventually, Culliton introduced the idea to bring back popular actress Elizabeth Hendrickson, who had portrayed Frankie, as Frankie's twin sister Maggie. Culliton continued to write for the show until late 2002.

After more staff turnover, McTavish again returned as head writer. Her storylines began airing in July 2003, which included the controversial rape of Bianca. Gone upon McTavish's latest return was Jean Dadario Burke as executive producer, being replaced with Julie Hanan Carruthers. Under McTavish, ratings fluctuated back and forth. To lure back long-time viewers, McTavish created new characters and romances, as well as scripted the return of various characters who had been gone for long. She introduced star-crossed couple JR Chandler and Babe Carey upon writing JR's return to the series, scripted most of popular pairing Bianca Montgomery and Maggie Stone's love story, and created fellow popular couple Zach Slater and Kendall Hart. Characters Julia Santos (Sydney Penny) and Janet Dillon (Kate Collins, who was originally slated to return for a brief stint) were eventually brought back.

On July 26, 2006, Tanika Ray, Rihanna, as well as other celebrities, appeared on the show. During the Rihanna appearance, a controversial storyline involving Erica's thought-to-be-aborted son having come to Pine Valley under the name Josh Madden intensifies when Josh learns of how he truly came to exist. In August 2006, after months of speculation, it was confirmed that fan favorite Eden Riegel would be reprising her Emmy winning role as Bianca. She was a part of a controversial storyline centered on transgender character Zarf/Zoe.

The most notable return was Cady McClain's return as show heroine Dixie Cooney Martin. The news of her return spread just two weeks before she reappeared on the series. In an unpopular and controversial move by the series, the writers chose to kill off Dixie in January 2007 only a year after her return. The character's death was the result of the Satin Slayer storyline where she is unintentionally murdered in place of character Babe Carey.

Another prominent return to the series occurred on February 9, 2007, when Susan Pratt returned as Barbara Montgomery. Pratt made her last appearance in July of that year. That same month, McTavish was fired as head writer, reportedly due to viewer criticism about her storylines. On May 21, 2007, James Harmon Brown and Barbara Esensten were announced as the new head writers of All My Children. The duo wrote for Guiding Light, Days of Our Lives, One Life to Live, Dynasty and Port Charles, and created and wrote for The City.

On December 12, 2007, ABC revealed Rebecca Budig would be returning to the series as Greenlee Smythe; the return was one of the most widely reported in daytime television history, attracting mainstream media attention such as the Associated Press and New York Daily News. Budig's return was overshadowed by controversy when news of Sabine Singh's reportedly unfair treatment as a Greenlee recast in order to bring Budig back incited viewer outrage.

On December 25, 2007, Soap Opera Digest reported the return of fan favorites Debbi Morgan and Darnell Williams as Jesse Hubbard and Angie Baxter. Morgan returned on January 18, 2008, and Williams on January 25, 2008. In April 2008, it was announced that Laurence Lau would briefly reprise the role of Greg Nelson for Jesse and Angie's much anticipated wedding. On May 21, 2008, Charles Pratt, Jr., former co-head writer for General Hospital, was announced as a replacement for Brown and Esensten amid record low ratings. On November 6, 2008, All My Children aired a special episode in which veterans share their stories unscripted. On November 12, 2008, the show celebrated its 10,000th show with a special appearance by Nixon and a special tribute to Myrtle Fargate (as portrayed by Eileen Herlie who had recently died). On December 19, 2008, a special episode ran for Herlie, showing clips from the past.

On February 16, 2009, All My Children made daytime history with the nuptials of Reese Williams and Bianca Montgomery, the first legal same-sex marriage in American daytime television. After departing the show in February 2005, Riegel continued to return to the series for limited guest appearances, but permanently left the role in 2010.

On November 20, 2009, Pratt was fired as head writer. Daytime Emmy-winning former head writer Lorraine Broderick was brought back to lead the writing team on an interim basis. Reportedly, Broderick returned at the request of show creator Agnes Nixon, but was not interested in remaining permanently as the team's top scribe.

=== 2010s ===
On January 5, 2010, All My Children celebrated its 40th anniversary with an episode structured like a documentary and hosted by character Hayley Santos. It featured appearances by characters Palmer Cortlandt, Nina Warner, Maria Santos Grey, Brooke English, Greg Nelson, Bianca Montgomery, Mateo Santos and Lily Montgomery. It was also the final episode for characters Joe and Ruth Martin, who retired to Florida, and the final appearance for Palmer, since actor James Mitchell died shortly after the episode aired.

On January 13, 2010, ABC Daytime announced the appointment of David Kreizman and Donna Swajeski as the co-head writers of All My Children, replacing interim head writer Lorraine Broderick, who in turn replaced Charles Pratt, Jr. Brian Frons, head of ABC daytime, stated, "David and Donna are the perfect team to bring new ideas to All My Children while remaining true to its core by telling stories with a focus on the integrity of the show's history, its characters and families on the canvas." Prior to his appointment on All My Children, Kriezman was the head writer of Guiding Light from 2004 to the final episode on September 18, 2009, and the co-head writer of As the World Turns from 2009 to the final episode on September 17, 2010. Swajeski's prior experience includes a head writing stint on Another World from 1988 to 1992.

With the death on January 22 of James Mitchell at age 89 (Palmer Cortlandt 1979–2010), the show aired a tribute episode to Palmer on Tuesday April 20, 2010. Gillian Spencer (Daisy Murdoch Cortlandt), Taylor Miller (Nina Cortlandt), and Cady McClain (Dixie Cooney Martin) returned for the episode. On February 8, Walt Willey returned as a contract cast member in the role of Jackson Montgomery, following numerous months away and dispute about his future on the show. On February 23, Julia Barr reprised the role of Brooke English; Brooke's return was timed to the retirement of David Canary (Adam Chandler) after more than 26 years on the show. Their final episode aired April 23, 2010. On July 17, 2010, Larry Keith, who was on the show from 1970 to 2005 as Nick Davis, and who gave Erica Kane the nickname "Princess", died. He was last seen on January 5, 2005, for the show's 35th anniversary episode.

In September 2010, Daytime Emmy winner Vincent Irizzary's character, David Hayward, was murdered. On the November 22, 2010, episode, David waltzed into the courtroom during Greenlee's trial (for which she was just sentenced to life in prison for murdering him) at the tail end of it, confirming rumors that he was going to return all along. Soap Opera Digest confirmed soon after that the show had planned this all along from the start. On September 16, 2010, Adam Mayfield (Scott Chandler) and Brittany Allen (Marissa Tasker) were announced to be leaving the show. ABC reports that they wanted to take both the characters in a different direction. On September 22, 2010, it was announced that Daniel Cosgrove (ex-Scott, All My Children; ex-Bill, Guiding Light; ex-Chris, As the World Turns) would return to All My Children and replace Adam Mayfield (Scott) as Scott Chandler. On October 28, 2010, it was announced that Sarah Glendening (ex-Lucy, As the World Turns) would be taking over the role of Marissa Tasker. Glendening debuted on December 27 and Cosgrove debuted on December 29.

In January 2011, Debbi Morgan said that she would take a leave of absence from the show. She said it was for personal reasons and on January 14, 2011, she released to the public that she has been diagnosed with Lyme disease. She returned during the second week of February and her first episode aired on March 8, 2011. On February 10, 2011, as part of her 25th (and farewell) season, Oprah Winfrey invited All My Children's Susan Lucci, Debbi Morgan, Darnell Williams, and Michael E. Knight, along with General Hospital's Luke and Laura (Anthony Geary and Genie Francis) and The Young and the Restless' Mrs. Chancellor (Jeanne Cooper) to The Oprah Winfrey Show. As a surprise, Winfrey shocked Lucci and the rest of the crowd by bringing back all of Erica's husbands. During February 2011, the TV Land sitcom Hot in Cleveland and All My Children did a crossover event. On the 16th and the 23rd, Lucci, Michael E. Knight, and Darnell Williams made guest appearances on the show. On the 24th, Wendie Malick guest-starred.

On April 2, 2011, amid rumors of All My Children's possible cancellation, Soaps in Depth broke the news via Twitter that longtime All My Children writer Lorraine Broderick had once again been named the show's head writer, replacing David Kreizman and Donna Swajeski.

==== Cancellation ====
On April 14, 2011, ABC confirmed that it would not renew both All My Children and One Life to Live after 41 and 43 years respectively, starting with All My Children ending its run on September 23, 2011, and with One Life to Live ending its run on January 13, 2012. Reasons for both shows' cancellations cited "extensive research into what today's daytime viewers want and the changing viewing patterns of the audience". It would be replaced by a new lifestyle show, The Chew, while its time slot on SOAPnet would be replaced by daily reruns of Days of Our Lives. In response to the cancellation of this, vacuum cleaner manufacturer Hoover withdrew its advertising from all ABC programs in protest, going as far as running a campaign to get ABC to reverse its decision.

On April 25, Cady McClain (ex-Dixie Cooney Martin) announced that she would be returning to All My Children but could not report what her storyline would be. Other former cast members announced to be returning to the series are Ray MacDonnell (Dr. Joe Martin), Lee Meriwether (Ruth Martin), David Canary (Adam Chandler), Julia Barr (Brooke English), Thorsten Kaye (Zach Slater), Eva La Rue (Maria Santos), Jennifer Bassey (Marian Colby), Kate Collins (Janet Dillon), Esta TerBlanche (Gillian Andrassy-Lavery), Josh Duhamel (Leo du Pres), Melissa Claire Egan (Annie Lavery), Leven Rambin (Lily Montgomery), Carol Burnett (Verla Grubbs), Jason Kincaid (Sam Brady), and Sarah Michelle Gellar playing a young woman who claims to see vampires (an allusion to the Buffy the Vampire Slayer story Normal Again).

On July 7, 2011, the New York Post reported that ABC had sold the licensing rights of All My Children and One Life to Live to a TV-focused online channel being developed by TV, film and music production company Prospect Park. ABC confirmed this via press release; as a result of Prospect Park's acquisition of the two soaps, All My Children and One Life to Live would be the first soap operas to transition first-run broadcasts from traditional television to internet television. Since the deal between ABC and Prospect Park is a licensing agreement, both soaps would continue to remain the property of ABC.

On September 8, 2011, the original Ruth Martin, actress Mary Fickett, died at age 83. The episode on Wednesday, September 21, 2011, was dedicated to her. On September 23, 2011, the series finale aired on ABC with open-ended stories. The final week featured Dr. Joe and Ruth Martin relocating to Pine Valley to cover recently arrested David Hayward's hospital duties. The return of Adam Chandler and Brooke English coincided with the revelation that David had somehow resurrected Stuart Chandler. Jackson Montgomery dissolved his relationship with Erica after she admitted that she prefers not to remarry. Unresolved is JR Chandler's plunge into insanity as he drunkenly aims a gun at a crowd of All My Children regulars during a welcome-home party for Stuart. The screen darkened before revealing the victim, leaving the story open for an eventual continuation with Prospect Park. On April 29, 2013, the revived series moved five years into the future after the original series finale on ABC. On November 11, 2013, it was confirmed by some of its actors that the series had once again been cancelled, this time by its online revival team.

=== Prospect Park's revival plan ===
==== Unsuccessful attempt ====
In August 2010, Prospect Park announced that it was shopping for a cable network to air All My Children in complementary to its future internet television channel. Prospect Park officially began negotiations with the actors of All My Children on September 15, 2011. On September 19, 2011, Cameron Mathison and Lindsay Hartley became the only actors that had agreed to continue the show with Prospect Park.

Prospect Park initially intended for All My Children to begin its run on the internet on September 26, 2011, but ran into challenges. One challenge cited was a need to negotiate a new contract with the union representing the actors of All My Children. On September 27, 2011, Prospect Park announced that All My Children along with its sister soap One Life to Live would be relaunched in January 2012 on the company's new internet channel, The Online Network. But on November 10, 2011, several sources reported that Prospect Park had indefinitely suspended its plans to relaunch All My Children and that the company would concentrate solely on the higher-rated One Life to Live. Reasons given for this decision were lack of funding coupled with Prospect Park not being able to sign enough cast members from All My Children.

On November 23, 2011, Prospect Park confirmed that it had officially suspended its attempt to produce both shows. Reasons given by Prospect Park for this decision included funding problems and poor negotiations with the unions representing the cast of both soaps. WGA and AFTRA, which respectively represented the writer and the actors, both expressed disappointment over Prospect Park's announcement.

==== 2013 revival ====
The new cast of Prospect Park's All My Children revival. (l-r) Heather Roop, Ray MacDonnell, Jordi Vilasuso, Francesca James, Darnell Williams, Eric Nelsen, Debbi Morgan, Lindsay Hartley, Cady McClain, Jill Larson, Julia Barr, Vincent Irizarry, Denyse Tontz, David Canary, Sal Stowers, Robert Scott Wilson, Thorsten Kaye, Eden Riegel, Jordan Lane Price, and Ryan Bittle.

On December 17, 2012, Deadline Hollywood reported that revival plans for All My Children and One Life to Live had resurfaced. A few days later, it was reported that Prospect Park had secured studio place in Stamford, Connecticut, where both shows would be filmed. The show had been filmed in New York City from 1970 to 2010, and in Los Angeles from 2010 to 2011.

Within the weeks following the reports, Lindsay Hartley, Vincent Irizarry, Debbi Morgan, Darnell Williams, Jordi Vilasuso, Jill Larson, Thorsten Kaye, Cady McClain, David Canary, Julia Barr, and Ray MacDonnell were reported and/or confirmed to be returning to the show's revival, while Susan Lucci would reportedly return for one episode, Eden Riegel would return for a guest-arc, Cameron Mathison might return to the revival in the future, and Alicia Minshew would return for one episode with the possibility of returning in the future. Along with the returning stars, a number of new actors were cast, including Ryan Bittle as JR Chandler, Robert Scott Wilson as Pete Cortlandt, Eric Nelsen as an aged AJ Chandler, Denyse Tontz as an aged Miranda Montgomery, Sal Stowers as Cassandra Foster, and Jordan Lane Price as a newly created character, Celia Fitzgerald.

On January 7, 2013, Prospect Park released an official statement confirming plans to revive All My Children and One Life to Live on The Online Network, their internet production company. Prospect Park signed deals with SAG-AFTRA and DGA for the soap opera's production.

Former All My Children writer and producer Ginger Smith returned as the new executive producer and creator Agnes Nixon served as consultant. The new episodes were 30 minutes long (with ads) and streamed on Hulu, Hulu Plus, and iTunes. Initially, 220 episodes of the show were ordered. The production company planned to shop the reboot to cable distributors beginning September 2013. The show schedule was four days a week (Monday-Thursday) with a Friday recap show, MORE All My Children, to feature behind the scenes footage as well as interviews with the cast and to be hosted by Leslie Miller. The revival show began on April 29, 2013, and production began on February 25, 2013, in Connecticut, with All My Children and One Life to Live taping in five-week rotations for 17 weeks.

On May 17, 2013, The Online Network announced that All My Children and One Life to Live would no longer air five days a week together, due to viewer ratings that reflect online viewing patterns rather than those of traditional television. Starting May 20, 2013, All My Children and One Life to Life will be presented in a new schedule, with AMC airing on Mondays and Wednesdays and OLTL airing Tuesdays and Thursdays. The recap shows MORE All My Children and MORE One Life to Life will also combine as one show airing on Fridays. The following day on May 18, 2013, both shows were noticeably missing from the FX Canada website and schedule, and although they subsequently became available on iTunes Canada, it was later revealed that FX Canada dropped All My Children and One Life to Live due to the reduction of episodes, as the carriage agreement had specifically called for the airing of four episodes per week of both shows. Due to the reduction, FX Canada stated that "the agreement is no longer valid". On May 20, 2013, the first episodes of the new All My Children and One Life To Live were available worldwide on The Online Network's YouTube page, TOLNSoaps.

On May 24, 2013, in a press release Prospect Park announced through Agnes Nixon that Snyder and McPherson will be out as co-head writers of All My Children and replaced by current script writers Lisa Connor and Chip Hayes.

On June 5, 2013, due to a labor dispute with the International Alliance of Theatrical Stage Employees All My Children and One Life to Live were forced into an early hiatus with the writers, directors and editors still working; there were talks of production being moved out of state, but those plans were later shelved.

On June 20, 2013, a deal was reached between Prospect Park and the Union, and taping will resume on August 12, 2013. On June 25, 2013, TOLN stated that there will be a scheduling switch for All My Children and One Life to Live. Starting July 1, 2013, all episodes of the week for both shows would be released on Mondays.

Beginning July 15, 2013, All My Children and One Life to Live aired for a 10-week limited engagement on the Oprah Winfrey Network, Monday through Thursday at 1:00 PM and 3:00 PM. All My Children aired a season finale on September 2, 2013.

In November 2013, Prospect Park indicated it was suspending further production of both shows. No new episodes have been made since that time. In total, only 40 of each program were produced in the new online format.

ABC regained the rights to All My Children in December 2016 following the dismissal of a lawsuit from Prospect Park against the broadcast network.

=== Aftermath primetime spin-offs ===
On December 17, 2020, Variety reported a primetime revival of All My Children was in early development at ABC, under the executive production of Mark Consuelos and Kelly Ripa. Leo Richardson—who previously worked on British soap opera EastEnders—is also attached as executive producer and writer of the project. Per the report, the primetime revival would center around a "young journalist with a secret agenda comes to expose the dark and murderous history of a town named Pine Valley only to become entangled in a feud between the Kane and Santos families." In another report, Deadline Hollywood revealed the spinoff, Pine Valley was first proposed by Andrew Stern, who pitched the project to ABC via his deal with ABC Signature in 2019; he will serve as executive producer, alongside Consuelos, Richardson, Ripa and, Nixon's son, Robert Nixon. Deadline Hollywood further reported plans to invite former cast from the daytime incarnation to the spinoff, as well as potential appearances from Consuelos and Ripa themselves. On September 11, 2024, A&E Networks announced that an All My Children holiday movie was in development for Lifetime. In August 2026, it was reported that Ron Carlivati and Jamey Giddens had been chosen to write the first two films for Lifetime.

== Lifetime Friendships ==
Mark Consuelos and Kelly Ripa became very close friends with Eva LaRue offscreen. LaRue is the godmother to their eldest son Michael.

== Setting ==
Since the series began in 1970, the show has been set in Pine Valley, Pennsylvania, a fictional suburb of Philadelphia. The town exists in the same fictional universe as other serial settings such as Llanview (One Life to Live), Port Charles (General Hospital, Port Charles, The Young Marrieds), New York City (Ryan's Hope, The City) and Corinth (Loving).

=== Crossovers ===
In 2000, All My Children was featured in a major crossover event that encompassed all the then existing ABC Daytime soap lineup. Linda Dano brought her One Life to Live character Rae Cummings, to Pine Valley, where she connected with her mother Myrtle Fargate. It was also revealed during that storyline, that longtime existing All My Children character Skye Chandler, was Rae's daughter. Skye, who had spent time on One Life to Live from 1999 to 2001, then followed Rae to Port Charles, the setting of the soaps General Hospital and Port Charles, where she became a member of the Quartermaine family, and made appearances until 2012.

All My Children has featured several crossovers with other ABC soaps, including an extensive 2004 'baby switch' storyline with One Life to Live which featured crossovers of over 20 characters between the two shows. In 2011, ABC did a comedic crossover with the TV Land comedy Hot in Cleveland, in which fictitious actress Victoria Chase (portrayed by Wendie Malick but credited as Chase) does a cameo appearance on ABC alongside Susan Lucci. In the Hot in Cleveland storyline, Chase and Lucci (portrayed as herself) are daytime-TV contemporaries and rivals.

In 2017, All My Children character Alex Marick appeared on General Hospital, where she masqueraded as her sister Anna Devane. She made further appearances in 2019 and 2020.

All My Children also gets mentioned in the sitcom Friends where the character Joey Tribbiani goes up for the part of "Nick the Boxer" in All My Children and convinces one of his students in his acting class to portray Nick as homosexual in an attempt to put the casting directors off. Much to Joey's disgust, the student gets the part. In addition the manager of the Central Perk coffeehouse, Gunther, reveals that he played Bryce in All My Children until his character was killed off.

== Ratings ==
For historical ratings information, see List of U.S. daytime soap opera ratings

Years as No. 1 series

Year(s)	Household Rating
1978–1979	9.0

=== 1970s ratings ===
1969–1970 season

- 1. As the World Turns 13.6
- 17. All My Children 4.4 (Debut)

1970–1971 season

- 1. As the World Turns 12.4
- 17. All My Children 4.8

1971–1972 season

- 1. As the World Turns 11.1
- 17. All My Children 5.7

1972–1973 season

- 1. As the World Turns 10.6
- 8. All My Children 8.2 (Tied with The Guiding Light)

1973–1974 season

- 1. As the World Turns 10.6 (Tied with Days of Our Lives and Another World)
- 6. All My Children 9.1

1974–1975 season

- 1. As the World Turns 10.8
- 5. All My Children 9.3

1975–1976 season

- 1. As the World Turns 9.4
- 6. All My Children 8.1 (Tied with Guiding Light)

1976–1977 season

- 1. As the World Turns 9.9
- 6. All My Children 8.2

1977–1978 season

- 1. As the World Turns 8.6 (Tied with Another World)
- 3. All My Children 8.4

1978–1979 Season (HH Ratings)

- 1. All My Children 9.0
- 6. One Life to Live 8.0

=== 1980s ratings ===
1979–1980 Season (HH Ratings) (Nielsen)

- 1. General Hospital 9.9
- 2. All My Children 9.2

1980–1981 Season (HH Ratings) (Nielsen)

- 1. General Hospital 11.4
- 2. All My Children 9.1 (Tied with One Life to Live)

1981–1982 Season (HH Ratings)

- 1. General Hospital 11.2
- 2. All My Children 9.4

Highest rated week in daytime history (Week of November 16 – 20, 1981) (HH ratings)

- 1. General Hospital 16.0 (3–4pm)
- 2. All My Children 10.2 (1–2pm) (#2 in viewers)
- 2. One Life to Live 10.2 (2–3pm) (#3 in viewers)
- 4. Guiding Light 7.4 (3–4pm)
- 5. The Young and the Restless 7.0 (12:30–1:30 pm)

1982–1983 Season

- 1. General Hospital 9.8
- 2. All My Children 9.4

1983–1984 Season

- 1. General Hospital 10.0
- 2. All My Children 9.1

1984–1985 Season

- 1. General Hospital 9.1
- 2. All My Children 8.2

1985–1986 Season (HH Ratings)

- 1. General Hospital 9.2
- 3. All My Children 8.0

1986–1987 Season

- 1. General Hospital 8.3
- 4. All My Children 7.0 (Tied with Days of Our Lives and As the World Turns)

1987–1988 Season

- 1. The Young and the Restless 8.1 (Tied with General Hospital)
- 3. All My Children 7.7 (Tied with One Life to Live)

1988–1989 Season (HH Ratings)

- 1. The Young and the Restless 8.1
- 4. All My Children 6.7

=== 1990s ratings ===
1989–1990 Season (HH Ratings) (1 = 921,000 Homes)

- 1. The Young and the Restless 8.0
- 3. All My Children 6.5

1990–1991 Season (HH Ratings)

- 1. The Young and the Restless 8.1
- 3. All My Children 6.2

1991–1992 Season (HH Ratings)

- 1. The Young and the Restless 8.2
- 2. All My Children 6.8

1992–1993 Season (HH Ratings)

- 1. The Young and the Restless 8.4
- 2. All My Children 7.3

1993–1994 Season (HH Ratings) (1 = 942,000 Homes)

- 1. The Young and the Restless 8.6
- 2. All My Children 6.6

1994–1995 Season (HH Ratings)

- 1. The Young and the Restless 7.5
- 2. All My Children 6.1

1995 Ratings (Millions of Viewers)

- 1. The Young and the Restless 7.155
- 2. All My Children 5.891
- 3. General Hospital 5.343
- 4. The Bold and the Beautiful 5.247
- 5. One Life to Live 5.152

1995–1996 Season (HH Ratings)

- 1. The Young and the Restless 7.7
- 4. All My Children 5.3

1996–1997 Season

- 1. The Young and the Restless 7.1
- 5. All My Children 4.7

1997–1998 Season

- 1. The Young and the Restless 7.0
- 5. All My Children 4.2

1998–1999 Season (HH Ratings)

- 1. The Young and the Restless 6.9
- 5. All My Children 3.9

==== Primetime special ====
January 15, 1995: AMC 25th Anniversary (#56, 10.3/15 rating/share and 16.0 million viewers) (Competition: Murder, She Wrote on CBS (#16, 14.5/21 rating/share and 20.8 million viewers) and seaQuest DSV on NBC (#61, 9.7/14 rating/share and 16.5 million viewers)).

=== 2000s ratings ===
1999–2000 Season (HH Ratings) (Nielsen)

- 1. The Young and the Restless 6.8
- 5. All My Children 3.9

2000–2001 Season

- 1. The Young and the Restless 5.8
- 6. All My Children 3.4

2001–2002 Season

- 1. The Young and the Restless 5.0
- 6. All My Children 3.3

2002–2003 Season

- 1. The Young and the Restless 4.7
- 5. All My Children 3.0

2003–2004 Season

- 1. The Young and the Restless 4.4
- 4. All My Children 2.9

2004–2005 Season

- 1. The Young and the Restless 4.2
- 4. All My Children 2.9

2005–2006 Season (HH Ratings)

- 1. The Young and the Restless 4.2
- 4. All My Children 2.6

2006–2007 Season (HH Ratings)

- 1. The Young and the Restless 4.2
- 5. All My Children 2.3

2007–2008 Season (HH Ratings)

- 1.The Young and the Restless 4.0
- 5. All My Children 2.2

2008–2009 Season

- 1. The Young and the Restless 3.7
- 5. All My Children 2.0

=== 2010s ratings ===
2009–2010 Season

- 1. The Young and the Restless 3.7
- 5. All My Children 2.0

2010–2011 Season

- 1. The Young and the Restless 3.6
- 6. All My Children 1.9 (Final ABC Season)

2013–2014 Season

- 1. The Young and the Restless 3.6
- 5. All My Children (First TOLN Season) 2.0

==== Record lows ====
The show reached a record low of 1,931,000 viewers on August 22, 2008. Its former low was 2,144,000 viewers on November 2, 2007. (Nielsen Media Research)

==== Ratings for final week on ABC ====
- Monday: 2,758,000
- Tuesday: 2,913,000
- Wednesday: 2,772,000
- Thursday: 3,031,000
- Friday: 3,475,000

All My Children had an overall increase of 495,000 viewers from the previous week, making it the second most watched daytime soap after The Young and the Restless. All My Children's final episode on ABC beat the final episodes of the two previous canceled soaps on CBS: As the World Turns and Guiding Light.

What follows is a breakdown of "All My Children's" final weekly ratings performance:

- Up 36% over its year-ago performance in Men 18+ viewers (596,000 vs 437,000)
- Up 34% over its year-ago performance in Women 50+ viewers (1,576,000 vs 1,179,000)
- Up 32% over its year-ago performance in Total Viewers (2,990,000 vs 2,270,000)
- Up 29% over its year-ago performance in Women 18+ viewers (2,265,000 vs 1,755,000)
- All My Children had its biggest week to week gain in total viewers since the week of December 27, 2004, when it gained 521,000 viewers. During the week of September 19, 2011, "AMC" gained 499,000 viewers.

=== Online viewership ===
All My Children's first online episode premiered with impressive numbers. On iTunes the show was the most downloaded TV season of the day, the 4th most downloaded episode of the day and on Hulu it was the most watched show of the day.

=== OWN viewership ===
On OWN, the series garnered over 144,000 viewers.

== Schedule ==
The show aired on ABC Daytime for the entirety of its television run:

- January 5, 1970 – July 4, 1975: 1:00–1:30 pm (12:00–12:30 pm, CT/PT)
- July 7, 1975 – January 14, 1977: 12:30–1:00 pm (11:30 am – 12:00 pm, CT/PT)
- January 17, 1977 – April 22, 1977: 1:00–1:30 pm (12:00–12:30 pm, CT/PT)
- April 25, 1977 – September 23, 2011: 1:00–2:00 pm (12:00–1:00 pm, CT/PT)

From January 1970 to July 1975, the show aired for thirty minutes at 1 pm (12 p.m.), but when the new Ryan's Hope premiered, All My Children was bumped up a half-hour to 12:30 pm (11:30 am). It returned to its original time slot in January 1977 and remained there until its September 2011 finale, expanding to sixty-minute episodes on April 25, 1977.

At the time of the show's cancellation, All My Children aired Monday through Friday at 1 pm Eastern, with an option to air the show at noon (11 a.m. Central Time) for stations that air news in that time slot. Encores were aired on SOAPnet in primetime at 8 pm (7 p.m.), late nights at 1 am (midnight), and early mornings at 7 am (6 a.m.). The week's episodes aired in a marathon on Sunday nights at midnight (11 p.m.).

Beginning April 29, 2013, new thirty-minute episodes are streamed on The OnLine Network (TOLN) via Hulu, Hulu Plus and iTunes at 2 am PST and 5 am EST every week, Monday through Thursday, and are available for viewing for one week on Hulu and indefinitely on Hulu Plus and iTunes. In Canada, also beginning on April 29, 2013, new episodes are available on cable network FX Canada at noon every Monday through Thursday.

=== International broadcasting ===
As of 2013, new episodes are available for purchase worldwide via the iTunes store. In Australia, All My Children aired on free to air channel 7TWO at 11 am weekdays. 7TWO screened episodes from 2007. It had previously aired on Network Ten in the late 1980s.

In France, All My Children, under the title La Force du Destin (Strength of Destiny) was aired on TF1 in March 2003, with episodes ten years behind the US during a week at 2:30 pm (after The Young and the Restless). But, because of a fall of the audience, the show was canceled.

In Italy, All My Children, under the title La valle dei pini (Pine Valley), started to air on Canale 5 in September 1985 at 2:30 pm, with episodes four years behind the US in January 1987, it was moved to another channel, Rete 4, always at 2:30 pm At the end of the decade, La valle dei pini began airing in late afternoon (and from September 1990 with only half US episode each evening), after a bunch of Latin American telenovelas and before General Hospital. Then, in September 1991, the show was moved to 9:00 am All My Children was canceled in May 1992, with episodes at that time six years behind the US.

As of 2012, New Zealand, started airing All My Children on TV3 1 pm weekdays. TV3 airs episodes from 2010. TV3 has reportedly canceled their contract with ABC NETWORK after learning of the show's demise.

All My Children was broadcast in South Africa on SABC3 from 2001 to 2014. For most of its run it was broadcast weekday afternoons, but for its last few years was broadcast weekday mornings. Episodes were four years behind the US.

In Canada, starting April 29, 2013, new episodes of the revived series are available on cable network FX Canada at noon every Monday through Thursday, followed by new episodes of One Life to Live at 12:30, with same-day repeats airing at 5:00 pm (followed by One Life to Live at 5:30 pm). It previously aired on CTV Two 12 p.m. PT, 1 p.m. ET in Canada until its 2011 cancellation and Citytv stations in Calgary CKAL-TV, Edmonton CKEM-TV, and Winnipeg CHMI-TV. All My Children aired on CTV from 1970 to 1982 and on the CBC Television network from 1982 to 1998.

In Solomon Islands, All My Children aired on Solomon Islands Broadcasting Corporation Mondays to Friday at 1:00 pm

In Israel, All My Children was broadcast on channel 2 from 1999 to 2005 at 4:30 after The Bold and the Beautiful; in 2006, AMC moved to channel 1 until it was cancelled in 2007. The show started from 1994 episodes until 1997.

== Awards, nominations and recognition ==
This is a list of the winners at the Daytime Emmy Awards; the show and its performers have received 360 nominations:

=== Daytime Emmys ===
==== Drama series and performer categories ====
- Drama Series: 1992; 1994; 1998
- Lead Actor: Darnell Williams (Jesse Hubbard) 1985; David Canary (Adam Chandler and Stuart Chandler) 1986, 1988, 1989, 1993, 2001
- Lead Actress: Dorothy Lyman (Opal Cortlandt) 1983; Susan Lucci (Erica Kane) 1999
- Supporting Actor: Warren Burton (Eddie Dorrance) 1980; Darnell Williams (Jesse Hubbard) 1983; Michael E. Knight (Tad Martin) 2001; Josh Duhamel (Leo du Pres) 2002; Vincent Irizarry (David Hayward) 2009
- Supporting Actress: Francesca James (Kelly Cole Tyler) 1980; Dorothy Lyman (Opal Cortlandt) 1982; Kathleen Noone (Ellen Dalton) 1987; Ellen Wheeler (Cindy Parker) 1988; Debbi Morgan (Angie Hubbard) 1989; Julia Barr (Brooke English) 1990, 1998
- Younger Actor: Michael E. Knight (Tad Martin) 1986, 1987
- Younger Actress: Cady McClain (Dixie Cooney Martin) 1990; Sarah Michelle Gellar (Kendall Hart) 1995; Eden Riegel (Bianca Montgomery) 2005; Brittany Allen (Marissa Chandler) 2011
- Lifetime Achievement: Ray MacDonnell (Joe Martin) 2004; Ruth Warrick (Phoebe Tyler Wallingford) 2004; Agnes Nixon (Creator) 2010; Susan Lucci (Erica Kane) 2023

==== Show ====
- 1985 "Outstanding Drama Series Writing Team"
- 1988 "Outstanding Drama Series Writing Team"
- 1992 "Outstanding Drama Series"
- 1994 "Outstanding Drama Series"
- 1995 "Outstanding Drama Series Directing Team"
- 1995 "Outstanding Technical Direction/Electronic Camera/Video Control"
- 1995 "Outstanding Live and Tape Sound Mixing and Sound Effects"
- 1996 "Outstanding Drama Series Writing Team"
- 1997 "Outstanding Drama Series Writing Team"
- 1998 "Outstanding Drama Series"
- 1998 "Outstanding Drama Series Writing Team"
- 1998 "Outstanding Makeup"
- 1998 "Outstanding Multiple Camera Editing"
- 1998 "Outstanding Live and Direct To Tape Sound Mixing"
- 1999 "Outstanding Music Direction And Composition"
- 2000 "Outstanding Art Direction/Set Decoration/Scenic Design"
- 2000 "Outstanding Achievement in Hairstyling"
- 2001 "Outstanding Achievement in Multiple Camera Editing"
- 2001 "Outstanding Achievement in Hairstyling"
- 2002 "Outstanding Achievement in Casting"
- 2002 "Outstanding Achievement in Costume Design"
- 2002 "Outstanding Achievement in Technical Direction/Electronic Camera/Video Control"
- 2002 "Outstanding Achievement in Music Direction and Composition"
- 2003 "Outstanding Drama Series Directing Team"
- 2003 "Outstanding Art Direction/Set Decoration/Scenic Design"
- 2003 "Outstanding Achievement in Casting"
- 2003 "Outstanding Achievement in Costume Design"
- 2003 "Outstanding Achievement in Hairstyling"
- 2003 "Outstanding Achievement in Lighting Direction"
- 2003 "Outstanding Achievement in Makeup"
- 2003 "Outstanding Achievement in Music Direction and Composition for a Drama Series"
- 2005 "Outstanding Achievement in Music Direction and Composition for a Drama Series" (tied with One Life to Live)
- 2005 "Outstanding Achievement Multiple Camera Editing for a Drama Series"
- 2005 "Outstanding Achievement in Makeup"
- 2005 "Outstanding Live & Direct To Tape Sound Mixing"
- 2007 "Outstanding Achievement in Technical Direction/Electronic Camera/Video Control"
- 2008 "Outstanding Achievement in Technical Direction/ Electronic Camera/Video Control"
- 2009 "Outstanding Art Direction/Set Decoration/Scenic Design"
- 2009 "Outstanding Lighting Direction"
- 2009 "Outstanding Live & Direct To Tape Sound Mixing"
- 2009 "Outstanding Technical Direction/Electronic Camera/Video Control" (tied with The Young and the Restless)
- 2010 "Outstanding Achievement in Costume Design"
- 2010 "Outstanding Lighting Direction"
- 2010 "Outstanding Makeup"
- 2011 "Outstanding Hairstyling"
- 2012 "Outstanding Live & Direct To Tape Sound Mixing"
- 2012 "Outstanding Achievement Multiple Camera Editing for a Drama Series"

==== Individuals ====
- 1973 "Outstanding Achievement by an Individual in Daytime Drama" Mary Fickett (Ruth Brent) #1 (The first daytime performer to win an Emmy)
- 1980 "Outstanding Supporting Actor in a Drama Series" Warren Burton (Eddie Dorrance) #3
- 1980 "Outstanding Supporting Actress in a Drama Series" Francesca James (Kitty Shea Davis/Kelly Cole Tyler)
- 1980 "Outstanding Design For a Daytime Drama Series"
- 1980 "Outstanding Achievement in Technical Excellence for a Drama Series"
- 1982 "Outstanding Supporting Actress in a Drama Series" Dorothy Lyman (Opal Cortlandt) #1
- 1983 "Outstanding Lead Actress in a Drama Series" Dorothy Lyman (Opal Cortlandt) #1
- 1983 "Outstanding Supporting Actor in a Drama Series" Darnell Williams (Jesse Hubbard)
- 1985 "Outstanding Lead Actor in a Drama Series" Darnell Williams (Jesse Hubbard)
- 1986 "Outstanding Lead Actor in a Drama Series" David Canary (Adam Chandler/Stuart Chandler)
- 1986 "Outstanding Younger Actor in a Drama Series" Michael E. Knight (Tad Martin) #3
- 1987 "Outstanding Supporting Actress in a Drama Series" Kathleen Noone (Ellen Shepherd)
- 1987 "Outstanding Younger Actor in a Drama Series" Michael E. Knight (Tad Martin) #3
- 1988 "Outstanding Lead Actor in a Drama Series" David Canary (Adam Chandler/Stuart Chandler)
- 1988 "Outstanding Supporting Actress in a Drama Series" Ellen Wheeler (Cindy Parker Chandler)
- 1989 "Outstanding Lead Actor in a Drama Series" David Canary (Adam Chandler/Stuart Chandler)
- 1989 "Outstanding Supporting Actress in a Drama Series" Debbi Morgan (Angie Baxter) #1 (Tied with Nancy Lee Grahn for Santa Barbara)
- 1990 "Outstanding Supporting Actress in a Drama Series" Julia Barr (Brooke English) #2
- 1990 "Outstanding Younger Actress in a Drama Series" Cady McClain (Dixie Cooney Martin) #2
- 1993 "Outstanding Lead Actor in a Drama Series" David Canary (Adam Chandler/Stuart Chandler)
- 1995 "Outstanding Younger Actress in a Drama Series" Sarah Michelle Gellar (Kendall Hart) #1
- 1998 "Outstanding Supporting Actress in a Drama Series" Julia Barr (Brooke English) #2
- 1999 "Outstanding Lead Actress in a Drama Series" Susan Lucci (Erica Kane)
- 2001 "Outstanding Lead Actor in a Drama Series" David Canary (Adam Chandler/Stuart Chandler)
- 2001 "Outstanding Supporting Actor in a Drama Series" Michael E. Knight (Tad Martin) #3
- 2002 "Outstanding Supporting Actor in a Drama Series" Josh Duhamel (Leo du Pres)
- 2004 "Lifetime Achievement Award" Ray MacDonnell (Joe Martin)
- 2004 "Lifetime Achievement Award" Ruth Warrick (Phoebe Tyler Wallingford)
- 2005 "Outstanding Younger Actress in a Drama Series" Eden Riegel (Bianca Montgomery) #5
- 2009 "Outstanding Supporting Actor in a Drama Series" Vincent Irizarry (David Hayward) (Tied with Jeff Branson for Guiding Light.)
- 2010 "Lifetime Achievement Award" Agnes Nixon (Creator)
- 2011 "Outstanding Younger Actress" Brittany Allen (Marissa Chandler)
- 2014 "Best Original Song in a Drama Series" Denyse Tontz (Writer/Composer)

=== Writers Guild of America ===
- 1997 "Daytime Serials"
- 1999 "Daytime Serials"
- 2001 "Daytime Serials"
- 2002 "Daytime Serials"
- 2004 "Daytime Serials"

=== Directors Guild of America ===
- 2000 "Daytime Serials"; Casey Childs and Conal O'Brien (nomination)
- 2001 "Daytime Serials"; Angela Tessinari (nomination)
- 2003 "Daytime Serials"; Angela Tessinari (nomination)
- 2004 "Daytime Serials"; Conal O'Brien (nomination)
- 2006 "Daytime Serials"; Casey Childs (nomination)
- 2007 "Daytime Serials"; Casey Childs (nomination)
- 2009 "Daytime Serials"; Casey Childs (nomination)
- 2011 "Daytime Serials"; Casey Childs and Angela Tessinari (nomination)

=== Other awards ===
In 2010, All My Children was nominated for a GLAAD Media Award for "Outstanding Daily Drama" during the 21st GLAAD Media Awards.

== Production ==
=== Executive producers ===
Duration	Name
January 5, 1970 – April 21, 1972	Agnes Nixon and Doris Quinlan
April 24, 1972 – April 20, 1979	Agnes Nixon and Bud Kloss
April 23, 1979 – April 5, 1982	Agnes Nixon and Jorn Winther
April 6, 1982 – September 1, 1986	Jacqueline Babbin
September 2, 1986 – June 5, 1987	Jorn Winther
June 8, 1987 – March 17, 1989	Stephen Schenkel
March 20, 1989 – April 16, 1996	Felicia Minei Behr
April 17, 1996 – April 21, 1998	Francesca James
April 22, 1998 – September 18, 2003	Jean Dadario Burke
October 27, 2003 – September 23, 2011	Julie Hanan Carruthers
April 29, 2013 – September 2, 2013	Ginger Smith

=== Head writers ===
Duration	Name
January 5, 1970 – September 17, 1971	Agnes Nixon
September 20, 1971 – January 4, 1974	Agnes Nixon & Kathryn McCabe
January 7, 1974 – March 30, 1984	Agnes Nixon & Wisner Washam
April 2, 1984 – September 26, 1986	Wisner Washam
September 29, 1986 – September 18, 1987	Wisner Washam & Lorraine Broderick
September 21, 1987 – March 25, 1988	Lorraine Broderick
March 28, 1988 – August 25, 1988	1988 Writers Guild of America strike
August 26, 1988 – January 13, 1989	Lorraine Broderick
January 16, 1989 – March 17, 1989	Lorraine Broderick & Victor Miller
March 20, 1989 – January 12, 1990	Margaret DePriest
December 22, 1989 – July 31, 1992	Agnes Nixon
August 3, 1992 – April 28, 1995	Megan McTavish
May 1, 1995 – August 18, 1995	Hal Corley (interim)
August 21, 1995 – September 27, 1996	Lorraine Broderick
September 30, 1996 – January 17, 1997	Lorraine Broderick & Millee Taggart
January 20, 1997 – December 19, 1997, December 24, 1997	Lorraine Broderick
December 22, 1997 – June 14, 1999 ( last credited episode), June 15-18, 1999 (uncredited episodes credited)	Megan McTavish
June 21, 1999 ( first uncredited episode), June 22, 1999 (first credited episode) – July 23, 1999	Agnes Nixon & Elizabeth Page
July 26, 1999 – November 25, 1999	Agnes Nixon, Elizabeth Page, and Jean Passanante
November 29, 1999 – December 15, 2000	Agnes Nixon and Jean Passanante
December 18, 2000 – May 4, 2001	Jean Passanante
May 7, 2001 – June 22, 2001	Jean Passanante and Michael Conforti
June 25, 2001 – August 17, 2001	Jean Passanante
August 20, 2001 – September 5, 2001	no head writer credited
September 6, 2001 – December 10, 2002	Richard Culliton
December 11, 2002 – February 21, 2003	Gordon Rayfield
February 24, 2003 – June 30, 2003	Gordon Rayfield and Anna Cascio
July 1, 2003 – April 26, 2007	Megan McTavish
April 27, 2007 – July 24, 2007	no head writer credited
July 25, 2007 – January 14, 2008	James Harmon Brown and Barbara Esensten
January 15, 2008 – January 30, 2008	Julie Hanan Carruthers and Brian Frons (WGA strike)
January 31, 2008 – August 26, 2008	James Harmon Brown and Barbara Esensten
August 27, 2008 – February 5, 2010	Charles Pratt, Jr.
February 8, 2010 – February 15, 2010	Charles Pratt, Jr. and Lorraine Broderick
February 16, 2010 – May 11, 2010	Lorraine Broderick (interim)
May 12, 2010 – June 24, 2011	David Kreizman and Donna Swajeski
June 27, 2011 – September 23, 2011	Lorraine Broderick
April 29, 2013 – September 2, 2013	Marlene McPherson and Elizabeth Snyder

=== Directors ===
Jill Ackles, Larry Auerbach, James A. Baffico, Jack Coffey, Jean Dadario Burke, Conal O'Brien, Casey Childs, Christopher Goutman, Sherrell Hoffman, Del Hughes, Henry Kaplan, Andrew Lee, Robert Scinto, Susan Simon, Diana B. Wenman, Anthony Pascarelli, Steven Williford, Christopher Goutman, Angela Tessinari, Michael V. Pomarico, Sonia Blangiardo, Habib Azar

=== Producers ===
Felicia Minei Behr, Jean Dadario Burke, Michael Laibson, Heidi Adam, Terry Cacavio, Casey Childs, Thomas DeVilliers, Lisa Connor, Linda Laundra, Stephen Schenkel, Nancy Horwich, Karen Johnson, Sonia Blangiardo, Vivian Gundaker, Dustin Fitzharris, Jennifer Salamone

=== Writers ===
Neal Bell, Clarice Blackburn, Bettina F. Bradbury, Craig Carlson, Cathy Chicos, Hal Corley, Christina Covino, Carolyn Culliton, William Delligan, Judith Donato, Caroline Franz, Sharon Epstein, Charlotte Gibson, Kenneth Harvey, David Hiltrand, Janet Iacobuzio, Anita Jaffe, Frederick Johnson, Susan Kirshenbaum, Kathleen Klein, N. Gail Lawrence, Mimi Leahey, Kathleen Klein, Karen Lewis, Taylor Miller, Victor Miller, Jane Owen Murphy, Juliet Law Packer, Michelle Patrick, John PiRoman, Pete T. Rich, John Saffron, Courtney Simon, Peggy Sloan, Elizabeth Smith, Gillian Spencer, Millee Taggart, Ralph Wakefield, Elizabeth Wallace, Addie Walsh, Mary K. Wells, Jack Wood, Rodney Christopher, Laura Siggia, Moses Thomas Greene, Wisner Washam, Marlene McPherson, Elizabeth Snyder, Lisa K. Connor, Rebecca Taylor, and Suzanne V. Johnson.

=== Editors ===
Anthony Pascarelli, Mason Dickson, Marika Kushel Brancato, Ernie Generalli, Matthew Griffin, Corey Pitts, Myron Tookes, Teresa Cicala

=== Final ABC crew ===
Writers	Producers/Consultants	Directors
Lorraine Broderick, Addie Walsh, Lisa Connor, Lloyd Gold, Chip Hayes, Kate Hall, Joanna Cohen, Rebecca Taylor, Dave Ryan, James Harmon Brown, Barbara Esensten, Jeff Beldner.	Julie Hanan Carruthers (executive producer), Nadine Aronson, Barry Gingold, Enza Dolce, Casey Childs, Steven Williford, Angela Tessinari, Anthony Pascarelli, Jill Ackles, Michael V. Pomarico, Shelley Curtis	

=== Revival crew ===
Season One

Writers	Producers/Consultants	Directors
Marlene McPherson, Elizabeth Snyder, Lisa Connor, Chip Hayes, Rebecca Taylor, Suzanne V. Johnson, N. Gail Lawrence, Joanna Cohen, Tara K. Walsh, Steven Williford	Ginger Smith (executive producer), Jeffrey Kwatinetz (executive producer), Richard Frank (executive producer), Sonia Blangiardo (supervising), Vivian Gundaker (coordinating), Jennifer Salamone (coordinating), Dustin Fitzharris (associate); Agnes Nixon (creative consultant)	Steven Williford, Christopher Goutman, Angela Tessinari, Michael V. Pomarico, Sonia Blangiardo, Habib Azar, Michael Eilbaum

== Merchandising ==
The game company TSR, Inc. published the All My Children game in 1985, based on the series. The game sold over 150,000 copies.

A DVD was released on January 24, 2004, titled Daytime's Greatest Weddings which contained All My Children and other daytime soaps' weddings.

A line of perfume and body lotion based on the series was also produced. It has long since been discontinued, though pieces occasionally surface on personal sale sites.

== See also ==
- List of longest-serving soap opera actors
