= Tricia Pursley =

American actress

Tricia Pursley is a retired American actress.

The Saint Petersburg, Florida-born actress is best known as Devon Shepherd McFadden, daughter of Ellen Shepherd (Kathleen Noone), on All My Children. Pursley played the role from 1977 to 1981, and again from 1983 to 1984. After being written off All My Children, she taped a primetime pilot "Love Long Distance" for Procter and Gamble productions.

She has since retired from acting and is operating a nursery business started by her father in Florida. She is a 1970 graduate of Northeast High School in St. Petersburg. She is also a graduate of Transylvania University in Lexington, Kentucky (1974). She went on to study at the Juilliard School in New York.
