= Gordon Rayfield =

American television writer

Gordon Rayfield is an American television writer.

In 1995, he wrote one episode on season 12 of CBS Schoolbreak Special titled "Stand Up", for which he won a Daytime Emmy for "Outstanding Children's Special" in 1996. That year he was also nominated for a Daytime Emmy in the "Outstanding Writing in a Children's Special". Since 1996, Rayfield has been nominated for five more Daytime Emmys.

In 2011, The Writers' Guild of America awarded him a Writer's Guild Award for outstanding achievement in Daytime Drama television writing for his work on As the World Turns. He was awarded with fellow writers: Susan Dansby, Janet Iacobuzio, Leah Laiman, Leslie Nipkow, Penelope Koechl, Jean Passanante, Lucky Gold, David Kreizman, David A. Levinson, David Smilow, as well as CBS itself.

== Career ==
- All My Children
  - Head writer: (Solo: December 2002 – February 21, 2003); (with Anna Theresa Cascio: February 24, 2003 – June 30, 2003)
  - Associate Head Writer: June 2002 – December 2002
- Another World
  - Associate Head Writer: 1998–1999
- As the World Turns
  - Script writer: August 14, 2008 – May 31, 2010
- Days of Our Lives
  - Associate Head Writer: December 7, 2006 – January 24, 2008
- Law & Order
  - Script Writer
- One Life to Live
  - Associate Head Writer 1996–1997; May 25, 2010 – September 1, 2010
  - Script Writer: December 16, 2003 – February 2, 2004
- CBS Schoolbreak Special
  - Guest writer 1995 (Season 12, episode 6 "Stand Up")

== Awards and nominations ==
- Daytime Emmy Awards
  - Nominations: (2003 & 2004; Outstanding Drama Series Writing Team All My Children and Outstanding Writing in a Children's Special Our America)
- Writers Guild of America Award
  - Win: (1996; Children's Script; CBS Schoolbreak Special, "Stand Up")
  - Win: (2004; Best Daytime Serial; All My Children)
  - Win: (2011; Best Daytime Serial; As the World Turns)

Preceded by Richard Culliton	Head Writer of All My Children (with Anna Theresa Cascio: February 24, 2003 – June 30, 2003); December 11, 2002 – June 30, 2003	Succeeded by Megan McTavish
