= Francesca James =

American actress, writer, singer, composer, director and producer

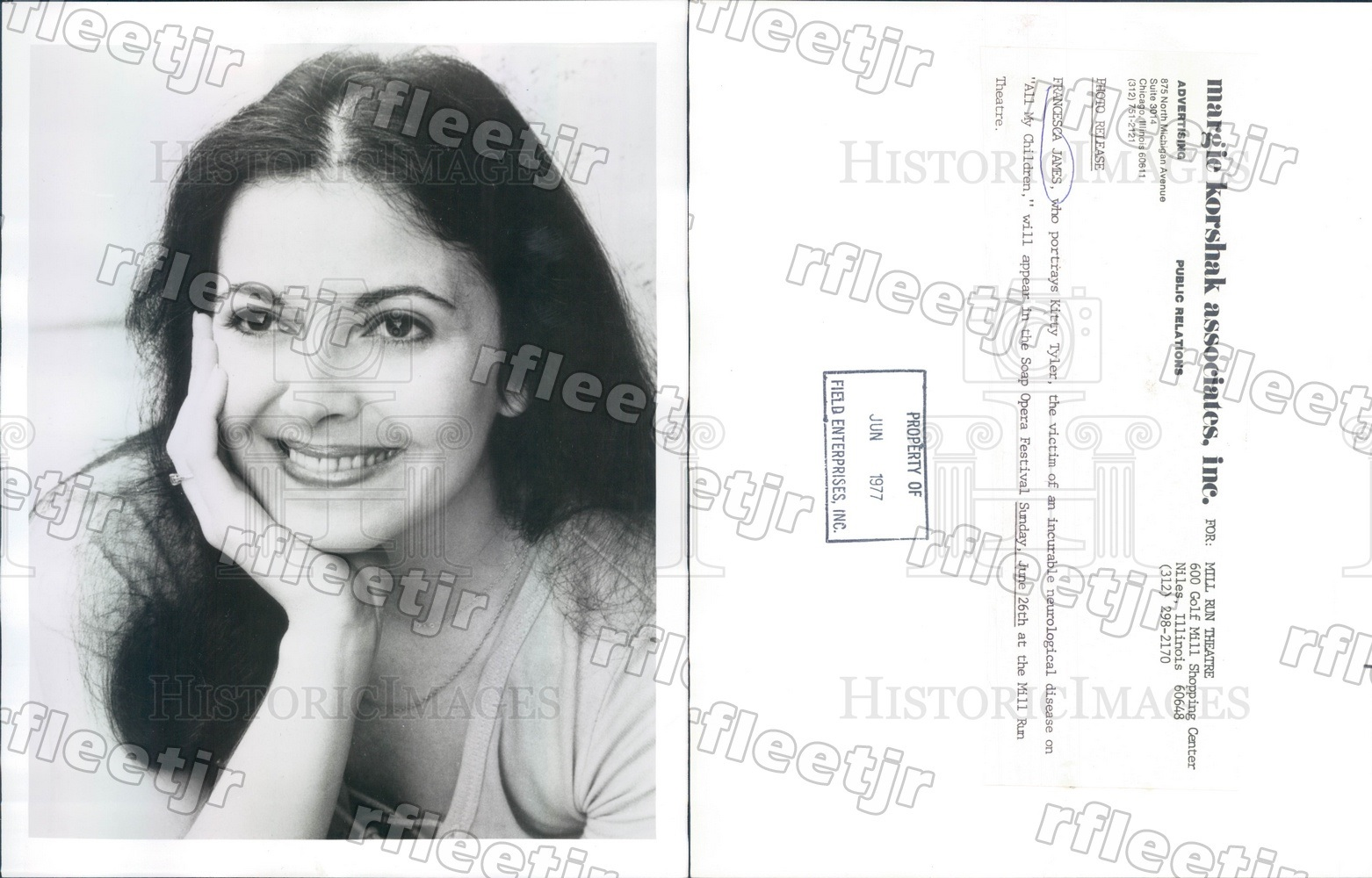
- James in All My Children, 1977
- Occupations: Actress, writer, singer, composer, director, producer
- Years active: 1970–present

Francesca James, 2026 - NATAS Gold Circle Inductee

Francesca James is an American actress, writer, singer, composer, director and producer.

== Biography ==
She worked in theater, and for several years, in daytime dramas, including The Secret Storm, As the World Turns, One Life to Live and All My Children (for which she was awarded a Best Supporting Actress Emmy in 1980).

James was written off All My Children in 1980 and then pursued a career in directing. Her directing credits include All My Children and Loving. She then moved to Los Angeles as a producer, where she worked on General Hospital, Santa Barbara and Days of Our Lives. While she was producing General Hospital in 1994–1995, the show was twice awarded the Daytime Emmy as Outstanding Drama Series. In 1995, James returned to New York and All My Children, which earned its second Outstanding Daytime Drama with her as producer.

== Awards and nominations ==
Daytime Emmy Awards

- NATAS Gold Circle Inductee (2026; Actor/Director/Executive Producer: All My Children, One Life to Live, and Santa Barbara)
- win (2005; Best Special Class Series, Starting Over)
- win (1998; Best Drama Series, All My Children)
- win (1995, 1996; Best Drama Series, General Hospital)
- win (1980; Best Supporting Actress, All My Children)
- nominations (1997, 1999; Best Drama Series, All My Children)
- nominations (1983, 1984, 1985, 1987; Best Directing, All My Children)

Preceded by Felicia Minei Behr	Executive Producer of All My Children; April 1996–April 1998	Succeeded by Jean Dadario Burke
