= Jill Ackles =

American television soap opera director

- Occupation: television director
- Known for: All My Children, Port Charles, The Young and the Restless

Jill Ackles is an American television soap opera director. Jill has directed for soap operas such as Days of Our Lives, All My Children, and One Life to Live. Jill occasionally draws doodles for Doodle Day. Jill was nominated for a Daytime Emmy Award for Outstanding Drama Series Directing Team shared with fellow directors of All My Children in 1997.

== Career ==
Jill Ackles has directed several different soap operas. Jill was nominated for a Daytime Emmy in 1997 for her work on All My Children.

=== Filmography ===
Year	Title	Notes
1996	General Hospital	Director of 1 episode
1997–2002	Port Charles	Director of 4 episodes
2004	Days of Our Lives	Director of 2 episodes
2006–2007	One Life to Live	Director of 4 episodes
2007–2008	The Young and the Restless	Director of 19 episodes
1996–2011	All My Children	Director of 66 episodes Nominated for Daytime Emmy Award for Outstanding Drama Series Directing Team in 1997

== Awards and nominations ==
Daytime Emmy Award

- Nominated, 1997, Directing, All My Children
