= Elizabeth Page (screenwriter) =

American writer, director and filmmaker

Elizabeth Page is an American writer, director, and filmmaker who has worked in film, television, and theatre. She is best known for her contributions to daytime television dramas, for which she has received multiple Daytime Emmy Awards and Writers Guild of America Awards. Page has also written and directed short films and staged plays in New York and regional theatres.

== Theatre ==
Page’s plays have primarily been produced in New York City. Her work Spare Parts was staged at the Whole Theatre in 1989 and later at Circle in the Square Downtown in 1990. The play was nominated for a John Gassner Award by the Outer Critics Circle, and published by Samuel French.

== Film ==
Page wrote and directed The Pilgrim, which received multiple awards, including Best Short from REEL13 on WNET, Excellence in Screenwriting at the 29th Annual Invitational Film Show at the New School, and Best Director at the Staten Island Film Festival.

She also served as writer and director of the short film Caught, which won Best Short at the Connecticut Film Festival.

== Television ==
Page began her daytime television career as a scriptwriter for The Catlins (1982–1984). She later joined All My Children, contributing as a script writer (1984–1990, 1997-1998), script editor (1998–1999), and co-head writer (1999, with Agnes Nixon and Jean Passanante).

From 1993 to 1997, she was a breakdown writer for Another World, before serving briefly as co-head writer in 1997. She subsequently worked on As the World Turns as a scriptwriter, from 2001 until 2007.

Page also contributed scripts to One Life to Live (2007–2012), including a stint as temporary script editor in 2009, and later wrote for General Hospital from 2012 to 2015.

== Awards ==
=== Daytime Emmy Award ===
- Nomination, 2003 & 2006, Best Writing, As the World Turns
- Win, 2001, 2002, 2004, 2005, Best Writing, As the World Turns
- Nomination, 1994 & 1996, Best Writing, Another World
- Nomination, 1985, 1988, 1990, 1999, Best Writing, All My Children
- Win, 1985 & 1988, Best Writing, All My Children

=== Writers Guild of America Award ===
- Win, 2006, Best Writing, As the World Turns
- Nomination, 2005, Best Writing, As the World Turns
- Nomination, 1999, Best Writing, All My Children
- Win, 1998, Best Writing, All My Children
- Nomination, 1997, Best Writing, Another World
- Nomination, 1995, Best Writing, Another World
- Nomination, 1994, Best Writing, Another World
- Nomination, 1993, Best Writing, Another World
- Nomination, 1990, Best Writing, All My Children
- Nomination, 1989, Best Writing, All My Children

Preceded by Margaret DePriest	Head Writer of Another World (with Tom King and Craig Carlson); February 3, 1997 - May 2, 1997	Succeeded by Tom King and Craig Carlson
Preceded by Megan McTavish	Head Writer of All My Children (with Agnes Nixon) (with Jean Passanante: July 26, 1999 - November 25, 1999); June 21, 1999 (uncredited), June 22, 1999 - November 25, 1999	Succeeded by Agnes Nixon; Jean Passanante
