= Felicia Minei Behr =

American television producer (1942–2025)

- Born: Felicia Minei; September 21, 1942; Long Island, New York, U.S.
- Died: March 2, 2025 (aged 82)
- Occupations: Television producer, network executive
- Years active: 1960–2006

Felicia Minei Behr (September 21, 1942 – March 2, 2025) was an American television producer and network executive who worked on three daytime serials. She helped launch All My Children and won two Emmys for Best Drama Series as executive producer of the show in 1992 and 1994.

== Career ==
Behr's first job in television was at CBS as a secretary in 1960. At a time when women were not allowed to hold high-ranking positions in television, from there, she worked her way up to various positions on several shows, including The Jackie Gleason Show, The Ed Sullivan Show, and The Garry Moore Show.

She was one of the pioneers of daytime television, helping to launch All My Children. As the first female daytime television producer, she joined the show as an associate producer in 1970. Her career spanned three decades, spending a majority of it as the executive producer of All My Children, winning the show its first Daytime Emmy Award for "Best Drama Series" in 1992 and a second in 1994, with nine nominations over her tenure. Her tenure as executive producer on All My Children lasted seven years. During that time, the show drew critical acclaim and was a consistent #2 in the ratings in the first half of the 1990s.

She also served as executive producer on Ryan's Hope and As the World Turns. From 2000 to 2004, she served as senior vice president of ABC Daytime, overseeing production of all ABC soap operas and The View.

== Personal life and death ==
Behr was born Felicia Minei on Long Island on September 21, 1942, to a modest Italian family. She attended Katharine Gibbs Secretarial School in New York City. She married Robert W. Behr in 1971; they were married until his death in 2017.

Felicia Minei Behr died on March 2, 2025, of brain cancer, at the age of 82. She was preceded in death by her parents, Vito Anthony and Frances (née Verdoni) Minei, and her husband, Robert W. Behr. She was survived by her son, Robert Behr; her four daughters: Kareen, Victoria, Francesca, and Kristina; ten grandchildren; as well as great-grandchildren, nieces and nephews.

== Positions held ==
All My Children

- Executive producer (February 1989–April 1996)
- Associate producer (1970–1975)

Ryan's Hope

- Executive producer (1988–1989)
- Producer (1982–1988)

As the World Turns

- Executive producer (December 1996–July 1999)

ABC Daytime

- Senior vice president (May 2000–May 2004)

== Awards and nominations ==
Daytime Emmy Awards

NOMINATIONS: 9 (1990–1997; Best Drama Series; All My Children)

WINS: 2 (1992 & 1994; Best Drama Series; All My Children)

Preceded by Joseph Hardy	Executive Producer of Ryan's Hope; April 1988 – January 1989	Succeeded by Show Canceled
Preceded by Stephen Schenkel	Executive Producer of All My Children; January 1989 – April 1996	Succeeded by Francesca James
Preceded by John Valente	Executive Producer of As the World Turns; November 1996 – June 1999	Succeeded by Christopher Goutman
