= Ginger Redmon =

American television soap opera writer

Ginger Redmon is an American television soap opera writer.

== Positions held ==
One Life to Live

- Script Writer (2003 – October 13, 2006)
- Continuity Supervisor (1999–2003)
- Assistant to the Executive Producer (1998)
- Intern (1998)

== Awards and nominations ==
Daytime Emmy Award

- Nomination, 2006, Best Writing, One Life to Live

Writers Guild of America Award

- Nomination, 2003 and 2005, Best Writing, One Life to Live
