= Janet Iacobuzio =

American television soap opera writer (born 1962)

Janet Iacobuzio (born January 2, 1962) is an American television soap opera writer.

== Life ==
She was born in 1962.

In 2020 she was one of the recruits for a fiction app named "Radish" which had $63m of funding and it was opening an office in LA. The experienced soap writers recruited included Iacobuzion, Addie Walsh, Lisa Connor, Leah Laiman, and Jean Passanante.

== Positions held ==
All My Children

- Associate head writer: 1993–1994 (hired by Megan McTavish), 2001–2003
- Script writer: 2000–2001

Another World

- Associate head writer: 1994–1995
- Script writer: 1989–1992 (hired by Donna M. Swajeski)

As the World Turns

- Associate head writer: 1996; June 9, 2010 – September 17, 2010
- Script writer: October 5, 2009 – June 8, 2010

Days of Our Lives

- Script writer: March 21, 2011 – February 15, 2012; August 17, 2012 – August 5, 2015

General Hospital

- Breakdown writer: January 17, 2012 – February 21, 2012, December 4, 2015 – July 12, 2016
- Co-head writer: June 16, 1997 – December 5, 1997
- Associate head writer: 1997, 1998
- Script Writer: July 12, 2016 – December 1, 2016

One Life to Live

- Script editor: May 15–25, 2009
- Associate head writer: February 24, 2005 – February 22, 2008; May 2, 2008 – August 17, 2009; September 16–17, 2009

Sunset Beach

- Script writer: 1998–1999

The Young and the Restless

- Outline writer: November 13, 2026 – present

== Awards and nominations ==
Daytime Emmy Award

- Win, 2012, Best Writing, Days of Our Lives
- Win, 2008, Best Writing, One Life to Live
- Nomination, 2006, Best Writing, One Life to Live
- Nomination, 2001–2004, Best Writing, All My Children
- Nomination, 1997 & 1998, Best Writing, General Hospital
- Nomination, 1996, Best Writing, Another World

Writers Guild of America Award

- Nomination, 2009, Best Writing, "One Life to Live"
- Nomination, 2005, Best Writing, One Life to Live
- Win, 2000, 2001, 2003, Best Writing, All My Children
- Nomination, 1998, Best Writing, General Hospital
- Win, 1997, Best Writing, General Hospital
- Nomination, 1994 & 1995, Best Writing, Another World
- Nomination, 1993, Best Writing, All My Children

== Head writer tenures ==
Preceded by Richard Culliton (no HW listed before they joined)	Head Writer of General Hospital (with Christopher Whitesell); June 16 – December 5, 1997	Succeeded by Robert Guza Jr.
