= Mike Cohen (screenwriter) =

American television soap opera script writer

Mike Cohen is an American television soap opera script writer.

== Positions held ==
Days of Our Lives

- Script Writer: 1987 - 1991, December 22, 2006 - January 16, 2008

Guiding Light

- Script Writer: June 16, 2005 - July 20, 2006

One Life to Live

- Script Writer: 1994 - 1996

Port Charles

- Script Writer: 2001 - 2003

Sunset Beach

- Script Writer: 1998 - 1999

The Young and the Restless

- Script Writer: March 2009-April 23, 2009

== Awards and nominations ==
Daytime Emmy Award

- Win, 2007, Best Writing, Guiding Light
- Nomination, 1996, Best Writing, One Life to Live
- Nomination, 1995, Best Writing, One Life to Live

Writers Guild of America Award

- Nomination, 2006, Best Writing, Guiding Light
- Nomination, 1994, Best Writing, One Life to Live
- Nomination, 1991, Best Writing, Days of our Lives
