= Michael Conforti =

American television writer (born 1955)

- Born: September 13, 1955 (age 70)
- Occupation: Breakdown writer, The Young and the Restless
- Spouse: Nirmal K Conforti

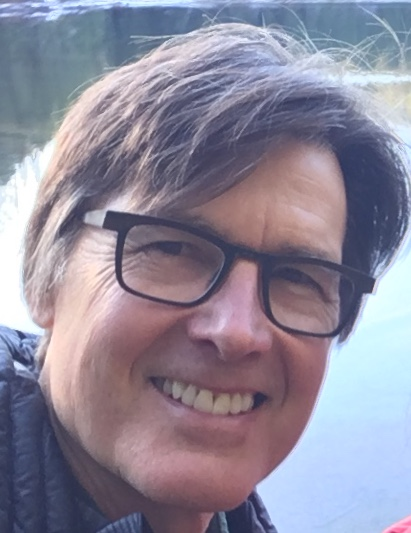
Michael Conforti

Michael Conforti is an American television writer on the soap opera The Young and the Restless. He played Jeremy Rhodes on Edge of Night, and Wally Bacon on Guiding Light. Conforti later became a writer for the soap opera Guiding Light. He became a co-head writer for All My Children and Guiding Light. Conforti is currently a breakdown writer for the television show The Young and the Restless. Conforti is the Board Chair of BendFilm which hosts the Academy Award-qualifying BendFilm festival every year in October. 2024 marked the launch of Basecamp, BendFilm's 4-day intensive filmmaker workshop which brings together young filmmakers and industry pros who serve as mentors.

== Positions held ==
All My Children (hired by Angela Shapiro)

- Co-head writer: May 2001 – June 2001

General Hospital (hired by Megan McTavish)

- Breakdown writer (July 2001 – January 3, 2008; March 17, 2008 – October 8, 2008; March 5, 2009 – April 30, 2012)
- Script writer (March 24, 2008 – February 26, 2009)
- Writer (January 29, 2008 – March 14, 2008)

General Hospital: Night Shift

- Script writer: July 12, 2007 – October 4, 2007

Guiding Light

- Breakdown writer: 1994 – October 1996, April 1997 – 1998
- Co-head writer: October 1996 – April 1997
- Script writer: 1990 – 1994
- Actor: Wally Bacon

The Young and the Restless (hired by Josh Griffith)

- Breakdown Writer: December 13, 2012 – present

== Awards and nominations ==
Daytime Emmy Awards

Wins

- (1993; Best Writing; Guiding Light)
- (2003 & 2009; Best Writing; General Hospital)
- (2017, 2021 & 2023; Best Writing "The Young and the Restless")

Nominations

- (1992 & 1999; Best Writing; Guiding Light)
- (2004, 2005, 2007, 2008 & 2012; Best Writing; General Hospital)

Writers Guild of America Award

Wins

- (1992 season; Guiding Light)

Nominations

- (1995, 1996, 1998 & 1999 seasons; Guiding Light)
- (2008 season; General Hospital)
