= Lorraine Broderick =

American soap opera writer (born 1948)

- Born: 1948 (age 77–78)
- Occupation: Television writer
- Notable works: All My Children, Guiding Light
- Notable awards: 4 Daytime Emmy Awards

Lorraine Broderick (born 1948) is an American television soap opera writer. She got her start on All My Children as a protégée of the show's creator, Agnes Nixon. She went on to serve four different stints as its Head Writer, ultimately earning her four Daytime Emmy awards in that capacity. Her work on the show has often been met with critical acclaim, with many citing her as its finest head writer outside of Nixon. She was the last head writer of All My Children's 40-year broadcast run on ABC, penning the show through its network finale on September 23, 2011.

== Early life and education ==
Broderick graduated from Andover High School in 1966 and Mount Holyoke College in 1970. She then received her master's degree in Chinese Studies from Stanford University in 1972.

== Career ==
=== Early career (1979–1991) ===
She joined All My Children as scriptwriter and breakdown writer in 1979, under the guidance of then-head writer Agnes Nixon.

In 1982, Broderick was promoted to Associate Head Writer alongside fellow Nixon protégée Wisner Washam. Washam was promoted to Head Writer the following year. In 1986, Broderick was appointed co-Head Writer, sharing duties with Washam, who would exit the show himself in 1987, leaving Broderick as the sole head writer. Broderick won her first Outstanding Writing Team Daytime Emmy award as head writer alongside Washam in 1988.

However, a network mandate for creative changes had Broderick demoted back to Associate Head Writer when Margaret DePriest was appointed head writer of All My Children in early 1989. DePriest would not last long in the position, as Nixon would resume head writing duties by the end of that year, with Broderick and Washam as her Associate Head Writers.

After 12 years with the All My Children writing team, Broderick left in 1991 to become the co-head writer of Guiding Light. While Broderick wrote for Guiding Light, the show received critical acclaim.

=== Mid-career (1995–2004) ===
In the spring of 1995, when Megan McTavish was fired from her writing post at All My Children, Broderick left her post as Associate Head Writer of Another World to once again become AMC's head writer. Broderick would win three consecutive Daytime Emmy awards for Outstanding Writing Team from her work as head writer of the show, bringing her total to four Emmy honors as a daytime head writer. She left All My Children for the second time in December 1997 when ABC Daytime decided to bring back McTavish.

In early 1998, Broderick was hired at CBS Daytime's As the World Turns where her most notable story was the resurrection of evil David Stenbeck and the switch of Lily Snyder's baby with another baby. In July 1999, a complete behind-the-scenes overhaul at the show led to Broderick's exit.

Shortly after, she was hired by Days of Our Lives Executive Producer Ken Corday to helm his show's writing team. However, she was there for less than a month before she left over disagreements with Co-Executive Producer Tom Langan (who would assume the writing duties himself). Broderick then joined Port Charles as an Associate Head Writer, before being appointed head writer of One Life to Live in January 2001. In 2003, she was demoted to associate head writer upon the return of famed One Life to Live writing team Michael Malone and Josh Griffith. At that time, ABC Daytime President Brian Frons offered Broderick a return to the head writing duties at All My Children, but she declined. Broderick left One Life to Live altogether in 2004, returning to Guiding Light for a short stint as Associate Head Writer during the show's transition to a new head writing team.

=== Academic work and later career (2004–2023) ===
She would eventually accept a position as a screenwriting and playwriting professor at Drexel University in Philadelphia, Pennsylvania. This move reunited her with her former colleague, Felicia Minei Behr, former executive producer of All My Children and As the World Turns, who served at Drexel as a professor of film & TV production.

In November 2009, Broderick returned to All My Children at the request of her one-time mentor, Agnes Nixon, following the dismissal of outgoing head writer Charles Pratt Jr., as part of ABC's concerted effort to increase ratings. However, Broderick once again passed on being head writer in a permanent capacity. On January 13, 2010, ABC announced David Kreizman and Donna Swajeski as the new head writers. Broderick would continue as the interim head writer until her successors were in place on March 15, 2010. She then assumed her duties as Associate Head Writer.

On April 2, 2011, amid rumors of All My Children's possible cancellation, Soaps in Depth broke the news via Twitter that Broderick was once again named the show's head writer, replacing Kreizman and Swajeski. The show's cancellation was announced just two weeks later, with Broderick writing the show through its conclusion on September 23, 2011. She then returned to One Life to Live as a breakdown writer until that show's finale on January 13, 2012.

In April 2012, it was confirmed that Broderick would join the team of new Days of Our Lives co-head writers Gary Tomlin and Christopher Whitesell as a breakdown writer. She continued in this role until January 3, 2023.

== Positions held ==
=== All My Children ===
- Head Writer: September 21, 1987 – January 13, 1989; August 28, 1995 – September 27, 1996; January 20, 1997 – December 19, 1997; December 24, 1997; February 16, 2010 – May 11, 2010; June 27, 2011 – September 23, 2011
- Co-Head Writer: September 22, 1986 – September 18, 1987; January 16, 1989 – March 17, 1989; September 30, 1996 – January 17, 1997; February 8, 2010 – February 15, 2010
- Associate Head Writer: 1981– September 19, 1986; March 20, 1989– November 22, 1991; May 12, 2010 – June 24, 2011
- Script Writer / Breakdown Writer: 1979–1981

=== Another World ===
- Associate Head Writer: 1994–1995 (hired by Peggy Sloane)

=== As the World Turns ===
- Head Writer: February 23, 1998 – June 25, 1999 (hired by Mary Alice Dwyer-Dobbin)

=== Days of Our Lives ===
- Head Writer: October 15 – November 10, 1999 (hired by Ken Corday)
- Breakdown Writer: August 17, 2012 – January 3, 2023

=== Guiding Light ===
- Co-Head Writer: January 15, 1992 – July 5, 1993 (hired by Jill Farren Phelps)
- Associate Head Writer: September 28, 2004 – January 4, 2005

=== One Life to Live ===
- Co-Head Writer: May 7, 2001 – December 13, 2002 (with Christopher Whitesell)
- Head Writer: December 16, 2002 – January 31, 2003
- Associate Head Writer: 2000–2001; February 2003 – March 24, 2004; October 28, 2011 – January 13, 2012

=== Port Charles ===
- Associate Head Writer: 2000

== Awards and nominations ==
=== Daytime Emmy Awards ===
Wins

- 1985, 1988, 1996, 1997, 1998 – Outstanding Drama Series Writing Team (All My Children)
- 1993 – Outstanding Drama Series Writing Team (Guiding Light)

Nominations

- 1982, 1983, 1984, 1990, 1991, 1992, 2012 – Outstanding Drama Series Writing Team (All My Children)
- 1992 – Outstanding Drama Series Writing Team (Guiding Light)
- 1994, 1996 – Outstanding Drama Series Writing Team (Another World)
- 2000 – Outstanding Drama Series Writing Team (As the World Turns)
- 2002 – Outstanding Drama Series Writing Team (One Life to Live)
- 2014 – Outstanding Drama Series Writing Team (Days of Our Lives)

=== Writers Guild of America Award ===
Wins

- 1997, 1999 seasons – (All My Children)
- 2014 season – (Days of Our Lives)

Nominations

- 1990, 1991, 1992, 1998, 2012 seasons – (All My Children)
- 1995, 1996 seasons – (Another World)
- 1999 season – (As the World Turns)
- 2004, 2013 seasons – (One Life to Live)
- 2013, 2015 seasons – (Days of Our Lives)
