= Ginger Smith =

American television producer and writer

Ginger Smith is an American television soap opera producer and writer for the ABC Daytime serial All My Children.

== Career ==
Smith was hired as a Production Intern in 1988 to work on the television show All My Children. She worked as a production coordinator until 1990, and then became an assistant to the executive producer. in 1994 she was a production assistant, and in 1996 she became an associate producer. The next year she worked as a co-ordinating producer, and in 1999 she became a supervising producer. Between 2004 and 2008, Smith worked as a producer; she also pitched in as a writer in early 2008 during the 2007-2008 WGA strike.

On December 24, 2012 it was reported that Smith would serve as the new executive producer of Prospect Park's revival of All My Children. Smith was the Executive Producer of All My Children from April 29, 2013 to September 2, 2013.

== Awards and nominations ==
Daytime Emmy Award

- Nominated, 1998–2002, 2005, Outstanding Drama Series, All My Children
- Win, 1998, Best Drama Series, All My Children

Preceded by Julie Hanan Carruthers	Executive Producer of All My Children; April 29, 2013 – September 2, 2013	Succeeded by Show cancelled
