= Anna Theresa Cascio =

American screenwriter

Anna Theresa Cascio (born November 7, 1955), sometimes billed as Anna Cascio, is an American writer. She has written plays and for television, particularly for soap operas.

== Television ==
All My Children

- Co-Head Writer: February 24, 2003 - June 30, 2003

As the World Turns

- Breakdown Writer: November 1, 2005 - September 18, 2007

One Life to Live

- Breakdown Writer: 1996 - 2002, Fall 2003 - September 26, 2005, December 11, 2007 - February 22, 2008, May 2, 2008 - January 13, 2012

General Hospital

- Breakdown Writer: August 17, 2012 – December 30, 2021

The Days and Nights of Molly Dodd

- Writer

== Theater ==
In 1988–89, the Manhattan Class Company performed her Bikini Snow Off-Off-Broadway and En Garde Arts presented her play Minny and the James Boys.

A scene from her play June 8, 1968 was included in the book Duo!: Best Scenes for the 90's. Her play Crystal was "critically acclaimed" and premiered by the Theater of the First Amendment in Fairfax. She and Leslie Arden co wrote the book for The House of Martin Guerre.

Her play Broad Channel, co written with Doc Dougherty, ran from April 13, to May 4, 2003.

== Awards and nominations ==
Daytime Emmy Award

- Nomination, 2002 & 2006, Best Writing, One Life to Live
- Nomination, 2004, Best Writing, All My Children

Writers Guild of America Award

- Win, 2006, Best Writing, As the World Turns
- Nomination, 2003 & 2005, Best Writing, One Life to Live
- Win, 2003, Best Writing, All My Children

Preceded by Gordon Rayfield	Head Writer of All My Children (with Gordon Rayfield); February 24, 2003 - June 30, 2003	Succeeded by Megan McTavish
