= Julie Hanan Carruthers =

American soap opera producer

Julie Hanan Carruthers (born January 30, 1960, in Sarasota, Florida) is an American soap opera producer and writer.

== Positions held ==
All My Children

- Executive Producer (October 27, 2003 - September 23, 2011)

Beyond the Gates

- Executive Producer (February 2025 - present)

General Hospital

- Senior Supervising Producer (June 1997 - December 1999)
- Supervising Producer (February 1996 - June 1997)
- Producer (February 1994 - February 1996)

Port Charles

- Executive Producer (December 27, 1999 - October 3, 2003)
- Senior Supervising Producer (June 1, 1997 - December 24, 1999)

Santa Barbara

- Producer (1986-1990)
- Editor (1984-1986)
- Associate Director (1984-1986)
- Production Assistant (1984)

== Awards and nominations ==
Hanan Carruthers has been nominated for several Daytime Emmy Awards.

Nominated

- 2003: Outstanding Drama Series: Port Charles
- 2005: Outstanding Drama Series: All My Children
- 2009: Outstanding Drama Series: All My Children
- 2010: Outstanding Drama Series: All My Children
- 2012: Outstanding Drama Series: All My Children

Preceded by Wendy Riche	Executive Producer of Port Charles; December 1999 — October 2003	Succeeded by None
Preceded by Jean Dadario Burke	Executive Producer of All My Children; October 2003 — September 2011	Succeeded by Ginger Smith
