= Brian Frons =

American television network executive

Brian Scott Frons (born June 15, 1956) is an American television executive and the former president of ABC Daytime. He is an adjunct professor at the UCLA Anderson School of Management and founder of Frons Consulting LLC.

== Education ==
Frons earned a master’s degree from Syracuse University's S. I. Newhouse School of Public Communications in 1978.

== CBS and NBC ==
Brian Frons first worked at CBS Daytime from 1978 to 1983. He left CBS in 1983 to join NBC Daytime, where he stayed during the rest of the 1980s as vice president.

In 1986, he canceled Search for Tomorrow which was at the time the longest running soap opera in television, but also the lowest-rated program among the 14 daytime soap operas on the air that year. Frons gained media attention in 1989 when he made a guest appearance in an episode of Santa Barbara, playing the role of God in a dream of character Mason Capwell (Lane Davies).

During his time at NBC, Frons also introduced Generations, the first soap opera to feature an African-American family from its inception.

== ABC ==
Frons joined ABC Daytime in August 2002. In May 2006, Anne Sweeney, the head of Disney-ABC Television Group, named Frons the president of the newly created Daytime, Disney-ABC Television Group.

In his capacity as president of ABC Daytime, Frons was responsible for the development, marketing, production and promotion of all ABC Daytime properties, which have included The View, Port Charles, All My Children, One Life to Live, General Hospital, The Chew, and The Revolution. In his new position, Frons took on the additional duties of overseeing SOAPnet and ABC Productions. During his tenure, soap operas General Hospital and All My Children switched to high-definition taping. Frons was also instrumental in the launch of the Soap Opera Digest Awards.

=== Cancellation of Port Charles ===
In June 2003, Frons announced the cancellation of the ABC soap opera Port Charles (a spinoff of General Hospital) after six years because of low ratings.

=== Cancellation of All My Children and One Life to Live ===
On April 14, 2011, Frons announced the cancellation of ABC soap operas All My Children and One Life to Live. While he made the announcement in person to the All My Children cast and crew in Los Angeles, the New York-based One Life to Live was tuned in through a video link. All My Children ended its run on the network on September 23, 2011, while One Life to Live concluded on January 13, 2012. As a result of the cancellations, Frons was the subject of widespread criticism. He was labeled as the most hated man among soap opera fans, with online petitions being made for his firing from ABC Daytime.

In place of All My Children and One Life to Live, Frons green-lighted two new talk shows, The Chew and The Revolution.

Actress Susan Lucci stated in her book, All My Life, that she was misled to believe that the rumors of the cancellation were untrue. According to Lucci, Frons told the cast and crew in December 2009 that in order to save All My Children, it was vital that the show relocate to Los Angeles from New York, with all players taking pay cuts. Lucci stated that Dominick Nuzzi, senior vice president of production for ABC Daytime, reported that the show's production costs were down 25 percent from the previous year. The show was also given a budget to support upcoming storylines.

=== Departure ===
On December 2, 2011, ABC Disney announced that Frons would be leaving the company effective January 2012. This announcement came the day after Frons terminated General Hospital executive producer Jill Farren Phelps and demoted head writer Garin Wolf.

Frons was replaced by Vicki Dummer, who has been with ABC since 1996. After Frons departure, ABC Daytime went to the newly created Times Square Studios headed by Dummer, while SOAPnet was transferred to ABC Family.

== Broadcasting career ==
- Senior vice president (London-based SBS Broadcasting, S.A.)
- President, Creative Affairs (New World Entertainment)
- Vice President, Creative Affairs, NBC Productions
- Vice President of NBC Entertainment
- Director, Daytime Programming, CBS Entertainment
- Creative Consultant of All My Children and One Life to Live
- Head Writer (with Frank Valentini) of One Life to Live (November 29, 2004 to December 10, 2004)
- Story Consultant of General Hospital
- Head Writer (with Julie Hanan Carruthers) of All My Children (mid-January 2008 to January 30, 2008)

== Personal life ==
Frons is an Adjunct Professor at UCLA’s Anderson School of Management.

Frons is married to Jeanine Guarneri-Frons, a former director on NBC soap opera Santa Barbara, and they reside in Encino, California.
