= Megan McTavish =

American actress

Megan McTavish (born April 2, 1949, Elgin, Illinois) is an American television actress and soap opera writer. McTavish is best known for several head writing stints on All My Children.

== Early career ==
Before becoming a writer, McTavish was a Chicago-based stage actress. She played Penelope in the National Radio Theater's Peabody Award-winning radio dramatization of Homer's Odyssey (1980). On television, McTavish broke into the soap opera industry as an actress; she played Lola Fontaine on Guiding Light from 1983 to 1984.

== Writing ==
McTavish began her writing career as a staff writer on the Procter and Gamble Productions' Texas. (The show was notable for allowing actors to contribute as writers; its final head writer, Pam Long, had been portraying the front-burner role of Ashley). McTavish worked as a staff writer for the company's Guiding Light.

McTavish was head writer of several shows. She was at Guiding Light from 1995 to 1996, at One Life to Live from 1999 to 2001, and at General Hospital from 2001 to 2002.

However, she is best known for three separate stints at All My Children. McTavish was mentored by All My Children creator Agnes Nixon and her 1992 ascension to head writer was reported in the press as a change of the guard. McTavish wrote for AMC until 1995, and returned for two additional stints, from 1997 to 1999 and from 2003 to 2007.

=== Accomplishments and criticisms ===
McTavish's first stint on All My Children was her most critically and commercially successful. McTavish updated some of the existing characters and introduced new ones. She wrote several sweeping umbrella stories over the years, most notably a story where Pine Valley is hit by a tornado. During her third run as head writer, she penned a baby-swap story involving two of the show's young ingenues, Bianca Montgomery and Babe Carey. She created several popular characters, including Ryan Lavery during her second stint in 1998 and Kendall Hart in 1993, who were still cornerstones of the show until its series end.

McTavish was criticized for various plot-driven stories during her tenures at All My Children. The 2003 Bianca rape storyline incited controversy when viewers and critics debated the storyline as an attempt by the writers to avoid onscreen physical intimacy between characters Bianca and Lena Kundera, as well as Bianca seemingly being punished for being a lesbian. She was criticized for rewriting history, such as the reversal of the landmark story where central character Erica Kane undergoes daytime's first abortion; McTavish rewrote the story to reveal that rather than having had an abortion, Erica's fetus was stolen and implanted into another woman's uterus, resulting with character Josh Madden. McTavish also rewrote history and the timeline of Erica's past to introduce character Kendall in the early 1990s, though this proved to be a popular story. Her decision to kill off character Dixie Cooney Martin in 2007 was criticized and cited as the "worst of 2007" by TV Guide.

== Writing credits ==
All My Children

- Head writer: August 3, 1992 – April 28, 1995, December 22, 1997 – June 18, 1999, July 1, 2003 – April 26, 2007
- Breakdown writer: June 29, 1987– July 31, 1992

General Hospital

- Head writer: April 30, 2001 – June 12, 2002

Guiding Light

- Head writer: July 17, 1995 – October 24, 1996
- Breakdown writer: 1985–1986
- Script writer: 1984–1985
- Actress; Lola Fontaine: 1983–1984

One Life to Live

- Head writer: October 4, 1999 — May 4, 2001

== Awards and nominations ==
Daytime Emmy Awards

WINS

- (1986; Best Writing; Guiding Light)
- (1988 & 1996; Best Writing; All My Children)
- (2003; Best Writing; General Hospital)

NOMINATIONS

- (1985; Best Writing; Guiding Light)
- (1990, 1991, 1992, 1993, 1995, 1999 & 2004; Best Writing; All My Children)

Writers Guild of America Award

WINS

- (1999 & 2004 seasons; All My Children)

NOMINATIONS

- (1986, 1996 & 1998 seasons; Guiding Light)
- (1990, 1991, 1992, 1994, 1996, 2000, 2007 & 2008 seasons; All My Children)

== Head writer tenures ==
Preceded by Agnes Nixon	Head writer of All My Children; August 3, 1992 – April 28, 1995	Succeeded by Hal Corley
Preceded by Douglas Anderson; Peggy Sloane; Nancy Williams Watt	Head writer of Guiding Light; July 17, 1995 – October 24, 1996	Succeeded by Victor Miller; Nancy Williams Watt
Preceded by Lorraine Broderick	Head writer of All My Children; December 22, 1997 – June 18, 1999	Succeeded by Agnes Nixon; Elizabeth Page
Preceded by Gillian Spencer (Interim)	Head writer of One Life to Live; October 4, 1999 — May 4, 2001	Succeeded by Lorraine Broderick; Christopher Whitesell
Preceded by Michele Val Jean; Elizabeth Korte	Head writer of General Hospital; April 30, 2001 – June 12, 2002	Succeeded by Robert Guza Jr. Charles Pratt Jr.
Preceded by Gordon Rayfield; Anna Theresa Cascio	Head writer of All My Children; July 1, 2003 - April 26, 2007	Succeeded by James Harmon Brown and Barbara Esensten
