= Delia Ryan =

- Ryan's Hope character
- Ilene Kristen as Delia Ryan (2013)
- Portrayed by: Ilene Kristen (1975–1979, 1982–1983, 1986–2015); Robyn Millan (1979); Randall Edwards (1979–1982); Robin Mattson (1984)
- Duration: 1975–1984; 1986–1989; 2013–2015
- First appearance: July 7, 1975
- Last appearance: June 1, 2015
- Created by: Claire Labine and Paul Avila Mayer
- Introduced by: Claire Labine and Paul Avila Mayer (1975); Joseph Hardy (1986); Frank Valentini (2013)
- Crossover appearances: General Hospital
In-universe information
- Other names: Delia Reid; Delia Ryan Coleridge; Delia Ryan Crane
- Occupation: Businesswoman; Waitress
- Brothers: Bob Reid
- Husband: Frank Ryan (1970–1977); Patrick Ryan (1977–1978); Roger Coleridge (1978–1980, 1989–present); Matthew Crane (1984)
- Sons: John Reid Ryan
- Daughters: Ava Jerome
- Stepdaughters: Olivia Coleridge
- Grandsons: Owen Ryan
- Granddaughters: Kiki Jerome; Avery Corinthos

Delia Ryan is a fictional character from the original ABC daytime soap opera Ryan's Hope.

Actress Ilene Kristen originated and last played the role, that was created and introduced by Claire Labine and Paul Avila Mayer and first appeared in the pilot episode first broadcast July 7, 1975. Delia is the catalyst for many of the show's story lines and remains a central component of the series throughout its run. Delia is the kind of character that viewers "love to hate". Delia has a habit of dealing with situations in ways that cause even more trouble. Delia is known for her early chaotic romances with brothers, Patrick and Frank. Delia eventually finds true love with Dr. Roger Coleridge. Delia is considered to be the breakout character of the series and remains one of the most iconic characters in daytime history. In 2013, Kristen would reprise the role of Delia on the sole surviving ABC drama, General Hospital where she is revealed to be the mother of the treacherous Ava Jerome (Maura West). Us Weekly ranked the character as the number-one villainess in soaps in 1977.

== Casting ==
Ilene Kristen was one of the show's original cast members. However, Kristen vacated the role in late 1978, with her last appearance airing January 5, 1979. The producers immediately began searching for Kristen's replacement. In the meantime, Robyn Millan appeared in the role of Delia for five episodes from January 18 to February 21, 1979. Randall Edwards officially took over the role of Delia beginning on February 27, 1979.

In late February 1982, it was reported that Edwards had been fired and Kristen returned to the role in early March. After failing to impress as One Life to Live's Georgina Whitman, Kristen was left unemployed allowing for her to return to Ryan's Hope. However, in 1983, Kristen was fired from the series when she was suffering from a thyroid illness. Robin Mattson, known for her role as Heather Webber on General Hospital, was later cast in the role. Mattson made her debut on June 15, 1984. However, Mattson was only contracted to the role for six months. ABC hoped to talk Mattson into a long term commitment, but after failed contract negotiations, Mattson vacated the role in December 1984, just in time for pilot season. It was announced in August 1986 that Kristen would once again reprise the role of Delia. Kristen made her onscreen return on September 5, 1986. Kristen remained with the series until its final episode on January 13, 1989.

In early October 2013, several reports surfaced and claimed that Kristen would reprise the role of Delia on the remaining ABC Daytime soap, General Hospital. However, the series never commented on the rumors. On Friday, October 25, Kristen appeared in the next episode preview. Ron Carlivati himself confirmed through Twitter that Kristen would reprise her role as Delia for two episodes on October 28 and 29. Kristen appeared on those episodes, revealing that her character, Delia, was the mother of Ava Jerome, the illegitimate daughter of Victor Jerome. In early January 2014, Kristen confirmed that she will once again appear on GH as Delia for four episodes on February 25 to 28, 2014. In May 2014, newcomer Michelle Stafford revealed that she had taped scenes opposite Kristen indicating that the actress would reprise her role of Delia.

In 2023, when asked if she would return to General Hospital as Delia, Kristen replied:

"It would be nice if Delia lived for real. It's like Delia in people's imaginations. We'll see. I'm sure I will be making some kind of appearance on that show at some point. It's too bad, because Delia could be causing a lot of trouble. They never exploited it for what it was worth."

== Characterization ==
"Delia lives her life unaware about anything that isn't important to her. If it doesn't involve her in some way, she doesn't care what's happening or to whom it's happening."

— Kristen on Delia (1988).

Upon the show's debut, The Robesonian described the character as "beautiful and sultry." Though Delia can be a bit insensitive, no one holds more for Delia then Delia herself Kristen explained. Michael Denis said Kristen displayed a specific kind of "manic verve" as well as "troubled" and "erratic." According to Denis, the character has two distinct sides to her personality, the "happy" youthful side which is usually betrayed by her "sick" side. Stephanie Schaefer described the character as "bewitching, "dizzy," and "wacky. Francine L. Trevens described the character as a "conniving" whiner.

Damon L. Jacobs said Delia displayed all the characteristics of Borderline Personality Disorder before it was first listed as a diagnosis in 1980. Kristen said for the character to be "real" she observed those that were extremely needy. Delia is never stands on her own two feet, she goes from depending on her brother, to depending on the Ryan family. Though Delia uses her femininity to manipulate, she does it out of love. Kristen described the character's speech as "Deliaspeak." Like most, she also referred to the character as a "child woman". Delia is never cruel intentions, [sic] but she goes to any extreme to get what she wants, and often does things that are counterproductive. In 2008, Kristen described Delia as "semi-tragic" and a "very unhappy person." Seli Graves referred to the character as "delightfully," and "deliciously devious." Us Magazine hailed the character as the bitchiest new character of the year in 1977. Kristen also referred to the character as "starved for attention." According to Claire Labine, Delia is not the "traditional bad girl." Instead, Delia is someone who possesses "desperate insecurities."

== Storylines ==
=== Backstory ===
Delia Reid grows up as a very lonely and confused child. Her father ends up in a mental institution and her mother works herself into an early grave leaving Delia in the care of her older brother, Bob. Delia becomes close to the Ryan family when the matriarch, Maeve (Helen Gallagher) shows her kindness and gives her food. As a teenager, Delia falls in love with the youngest Ryan son, Patrick. However, their romance ends when Pat chooses his medical career over her. Delia later begins seeing the mysterious Victor Jerome (Jack Axelrod). She later discovers that he is a mobster and she breaks off the relationship only to learn she is pregnant. Delia gives birth to a daughter whom she puts up for adoption. Delia then falls for Pat's older brother, Frank Ryan and they marry in 1970. The marriage is strained due to Frank's law school affair with Jillian Coleridge. Delia then gets herself pregnant believing it will keep Frank from straying. Delia grows up without any guidance or security due to losing her parents at such a young age. She has a lot love to give, but is unaware of the appropriate ways to show her love for others.

=== 1975–1989 ===
In July 1975, Frank (Michael Hawkins) confronts Delia on the stairs at Riverside Hospital and asks her for a divorce and she angrily pushes him down the stairs. Though he nearly dies, Frank still covers for Delia and they try to repair their marriage. In November 1976, Delia shoves Frank's lover, Jill Coleridge (Nancy Addison), falling over Little John's tricycle, and she sustains some injuries, being shoved in the same manner as she shoved Frank, which angers the Ryan family towards her, and imperils her chances of getting custody of her son. However, when Delia begins an affair with Dr. Roger Coleridge (Ron Hale), Jill's brother, Frank divorces her in February 1977. Delia then turns to her first love, Patrick (Malcolm Groome) and seduces him. Pat had then become engaged and was planning a St. Patrick's day wedding to Faith Coleridge (Catherine Hicks). During Pat and Faith's engagement party, Delia tells Pat she is pregnant. Pat refused to marry her and insisted he was going to marry Faith. Delia secretly miscarries on April 1, 1977, but keeps quiet as she marries Pat several weeks later. During the marriage, Delia resorts to extremes to keep Patrick's attention including faking a miscarriage and a mental breakdowns. When Pat turns to drugs and pushes her down the stairs during a confrontation, Delia is left temporarily blind; though she recovers, Delia continues to fake blindness. During a cruise in April 1978, Pat finds out that Delia was faking the blindness. When they return to Riverside, he also finds out from Roger and Faith all of Delia's schemes over the past year. The Ryan family then confront Delia on all her crimes, then decide to detach from her behavior. Delia goes into therapy, then agrees to having the marriage annulled in September 1978. Roger convinces Delia that she is fine just the way she is. He helps Delia establish her independence. They marry in October 1978. Delia (Edwards) becomes heavily involved in the stock market and her investments begin to pay off. However, when Roger suspects her of cheating with her stock broker, he divorces her. Delia later opens her own restaurant, The Crystal Palace and begins dating Ryan family cousin, Barry (Richard Backus). When Delia finds out Barry has been cheating on her, she runs him over and frames her former sister-in-law, Faith Coleridge (Karen Morris-Gowdy) for the crime. Due to lack of finances, Delia loses her business to mob boss, Joe Novak (Roscoe Born); however she is forced to shut The Palace down in 1982. Delia leaves Riverside in November 1983 after getting a job offer. In actuality, Frank (Geoff Pierson) sets up the job with the help of Rae Woodard (Louise Shaffer) so he can get custody of Little John. Delia resurfaces on June 15, 1984 when she marries wealthy oilman Matthew Crane (Harve Presnell). The marriage quickly falls apart due to Delia's affair with Steve Latham (Franc Luz). After the divorce, Delia relocates to California.

Delia returns to Riverside in September 1986 for her grandson Owen's christening. Delia sets her sights on Roger once again and does her best to win his affections from his wife, Maggie Shelby (Cali Timmins). Delia even kidnaps the pregnant Maggie and helps to deliver her daughter, Olivia. Maggie eventually leaves town allowing for Roger and Delia to reconnect. The couple remarries on January 9, 1989.

=== 2013–15 ===
Delia was introduced on General Hospital in October 2013 when she is visited by Sam Morgan (Kelly Monaco) and Silas Clay (Michael Easton) and forced to admit that she is the biological mother of Ava Jerome (Maura West) from an affair with late mobster, Victor Jerome (Jack Axelrod). Delia and Ava eventually reunite when Ava shows up in New York. Delia later comes to Port Charles to run interference with Sonny Corinthos (Maurice Benard) for Ava. Ava reveals that she killed Sonny's girlfriend and that Sonny will kill her once she delivers her baby. To protect her daughter, Delia tries to steal information implicating Sonny in another murder but is caught and sent back to New York. When Ava was presumed dead, she popped up at Ryan's Bar to tell her mother that she was alive, and the two of them later schemed to give Ava another identity as a dark-haired look-alike whom Delia claimed was a twin she had also given up for adoption.

== Reception ==
Ilene Kristen was immediately praised for her portrayal of Delia. Ronni Ashcroft who praised Kristen for her portrayal said, "it's a wonder she's able to pull off Delia's bitchiness so convincingly" because the two were exact opposites of one another. Francine L. Trevens said, "She plays Delia to perfection." In 1978, Kristen won Afternoon TV Award for Best Actress for her portrayal of Delia. Kristen also earned two Soap Opera Digest Award nominations for Outstanding Comic Performance in 1988, and for Outstanding Villainess in 1989. Kristen ranked at #21 on We Love Soaps list of the 50 Greatest Soap Actresses. Fans immediately took to Edwards in the role. John N. Goudas praised Edwards for her portrayal and said the actress made the character very multidimensional. Edwards' firing was met with skepticism from Lynda Hirsch who said that Edwards had become very popular in her own right. Because the actresses were so different, "it's hard to imagine Delia reverting into the character that Ilene made her originally," said Hirsch. Despite Edwards success in the role, Kristen believed that only she could capture the true essence of Delia. Seli Graves agreed with Kristen's assessment in 1988 and said the character "resisted anyone else's efforts to bring out the unique qualities" of Delia. In 2023, Michael Fairman from Michael Fairman TV wrote that fans "will always remember" Kristen's portrayal of Delia, commenting that the character "definitely stirred the pot in the Ryan family and was responsible for many machinations and issues that she caused the clan; all in her efforts to find love."
