= 6th Daytime Emmy Awards =

- Date: May 17, 1979
- Location: Vivian Beaumont Theatre
- Presented by: National Academy of Television Arts and Sciences
- Hosted by: Bob Barker

Highlights
- Outstanding Drama Series: Ryan's Hope
- Outstanding Game Show: Hollywood Squares

Television/radio coverage
- Network: CBS

The 6th Daytime Emmy Awards were held in 1979 to commemorate excellence in American daytime programming from the previous year (1978). The 1979 Emmy awards introduced the supporting actor and actress categories, meaning that five awards were given out that year, a first in the awards show's history. The outstanding individual achievement in technical and design excellence for daytime drama series category made its debut also (which includes video, audio, music, lighting, art and scenic directors, designers, makeup artists, hair dressers, graphic and title sequence designers).

The ceremony was telecast at 3 p.m. Thursday, May 17 on CBS. Guiding Light, normally scheduled for 2:30-3:30 p.m., aired a half-hour episode. Love of Life, normally scheduled for 4 p.m., was preempted.

Winners in each category are in bold.

== Outstanding Daytime Drama Series ==
- All My Children
- Days of Our Lives
- **Ryan's Hope**
- The Young and the Restless

== Outstanding Actor in a Daytime Drama Series ==
- Nicholas Benedict (Phil Brent, All My Children)
- Jed Allan (Don Craig, Days of our Lives)
- John Clarke (Mickey Horton, Days of our Lives)
- Joel Crothers (Dr. Miles Cavanaugh, The Edge of Night)
- **Al Freeman Jr.** (**Ed Hall**, **One Life to Live**)
- Michael Levin (Jack Fenelli, Ryan's Hope)

== Outstanding Actress in a Daytime Drama Series ==
- **Irene Dailey** (**Liz Matthews**, **Another World**)
- Beverlee McKinsey (Iris Carrington, Another World)
- Victoria Wyndham (Rachel Cory, Another World)
- Susan Seaforth Hayes (Julie Williams, Days of Our Lives)
- Nancy Addison (Jill Coleridge, Ryan's Hope)
- Helen Gallagher (Maeve Ryan, Ryan's Hope)

== Outstanding Supporting Actor in a Daytime Drama Series ==
- Joseph Gallison (Dr. Neil Curtis, Days of Our Lives)
- Mandel Kramer (Bill Marceau, The Edge of Night)
- **Peter Hansen** (**Lee Baldwin**, **General Hospital**)
- Bernard Barrow (Johnny Ryan, Ryan's Hope)
- Ron Hale (Dr. Roger Coleridge, Ryan's Hope)
- Lewis Arlt (David Sutton, Search for Tomorrow)

== Outstanding Supporting Actress in a Daytime Drama Series ==
- Frances Reid (Alice Horton, Days of Our Lives)
- **Suzanne Rogers** (**Maggie Horton**, **Days of Our Lives**)
- Lois Kibbee (Geraldine Whitney, The Edge of Night)
- Rachel Ames (Audrey March, General Hospital)
- Susan Brown (Dr. Gail Adamson Baldwin, General Hospital)

== Outstanding Daytime Drama Series Writing ==
- Days of our Lives
- The Young and the Restless
- All My Children
- **Ryan's Hope**

== Outstanding Daytime Drama Series Directing ==
- All My Children
- **Ryan's Hope**
- The Edge of Night
- Another World
- Days of our Lives
- The Young and the Restless

== Outstanding Game Show ==
- **Hollywood Squares** - A Heatter-Quigley Production for NBC
- Family Feud - A Mark Goodson-Bill Todman Production for ABC
- The $20,000 Pyramid - A Bob Stewart Production for ABC

== Outstanding Game Show Host ==
- **Dick Clark** (The $20,000 Pyramid)
- Bob Barker (The Price Is Right) (Disqualified. A submitted episode aired after cutoff date.)
- Peter Marshall (Hollywood Squares)
