= List of Ryan's Hope characters =

This is a list of characters that appeared in the ABC soap opera Ryan's Hope.

== A ==
Sheik Haroun Al Raschid
(Played by Kaleel Sakakeeny, 1981)

Financial backer of archaeological excavations

Ken Alexander
(Played by Will Lyman, 1979)

Gordon Allison
(Played by Sam Stoneburner, 1981)

Roger Coleridge's stock broker

Amelia
(Played by Lauren Kristyne, 1981)

Daughter to Rose Pearse Melina, adopted by daughter of Alexei Vartova.

== B ==
Treat Baker
(Played by Dan Marderosian, 1985–86)

Detective on the Riverside police force, who became rookie Rick Hyde's first partner.

Sam Banacek
(Played by Jack Palmer, 1987)

Private Detective Bauer
(Played by William Gleason, 1981)

Hired by Rae Woodard to find her daughter Kimberly Harris Beaulac and granddaughter Arley Beaulac.

Marguerite Beaulac
(Played by Gale Sondergaard, 1976; Anne Revere, 1977)

Mother of Dr. Seneca Beaulac.

Eleanor "Nell" Beaulac
(Played by Diana van der Vlis, 1975–76)

Dr. Seneca Beaulac
(Played by John Gabriel, 1975–1985, 1988–89)

Tiger Bennett
(Played by Duncan Gamble, 1984–85)

Dr. Evelyn Blair
(Played by Pamela Burrell 1981)

Riverside Hospital doctor

Chessy Blake
(Played by Susan Scannell, 1985)

Stanley Bosworth
(Played by Gregory Salata, 1983)

Mitch Bronski
(Played by James Sloyan, 1982–83)

Sal Brooks
(Played by Tony Schultz, 1981)

Joe Novak's henchman. Killed on orders of Alexei Vartova.

Zena Brown
(Played by Tichina Arnold, 1987–89)

Zena came from one of the less desirable parts of New York City.

Diana Buckman
(Played by Liz Kemp, 1981)

Actress on hospital drama The Proud and the Passionate television show.

Anne Burney
(Played by Jody Catlin, 1976–78)

Divorce attorney who represented both Delia Reid Ryan and Jack Fenelli (The character was played by the wife of actor Justin Dees.)

Orson Burns
(Played by Nicolas Surovy, 1981-1982; Robert Desiderio, 1982)

Nick Bush
(Played by Richard Milanesi, 1981)

Alexei Vartova's personal assistant

== C ==
Cyril Campion
(Played by Bill Moor, 1981)

Museum curator.

Diana Buckminster Carter
(Played by Sally Chamberlin, 1975–76)

Mother of Dr. Bucky Carter.

Dr. Buckminister "Bucky" Carter
(Played by Justin Deas, 1975–78)

Kenneth Castle
(Played by Ty McConnell, 1975–76)

Claudius Church
(Played by Charles Cioffi, 1980)

Dr. Adam Cohen
(Played by Sam Behrens, 1979–80)

Dr. Ed Coleridge
(Played by Frank Latimore, 1975–76)

Edmund Strong Coleridge
(Played by Buddy Schultz, 1977–79)

Edmund was the son of Jillian Coleridge and Frank Ryan - - the product of their affair who was long believed to be the son of Jill's first husband, Seneca Beaulac. Edmund tragically died in a fire shortly after Jill and Frank learned the truth about his paternity which Seneca had kept secret.

Dr. Faith Coleridge
(Played by Faith Catlin, 1975–76; Nancy Barrett, 1976; Catherine Hicks, 1976–78; Karen Morris-Gowdy, 1978–83, 1989; Katherine Justice, 2 episodes, 1979). Initially unsure of which area of medicine she preferred but later became a pediatrician.

Grace Coleridge
(Played by Caroline Wilde, 1989)

Young daughter of Faith Coleridge, who accompanied her mother in her return to New York during the final 10 episodes of the series.

Jillian Coleridge
(Played by Nancy Addison Altman, 1975–88, 1989)

Dr. Roger Coleridge
(Played by Ron Hale, 1975–89)

Roger was the son of Edmund and Judith Coleridge who married Delia Reid, Maggie Shelby, and Delia Reid (again). Father of Olivia Coleridge, his daughter with Maggie.

Olivia Coleridge
(Played by Kelly & Melissa Nevins, 1987–88; Jennifer & Katherine Ostroth, 1988–89)

Infant daughter of Roger Coleridge and Maggie Shelby, born in May 1987.

Annie Colleary
(Played by Pauline Flanagan, 1979; 1981, 1987)

Maeve Ryan's sister, who lived in Ireland.

Sean Colleary
(Played by Ralph Williams, 1979)

Father of Maeve Colleary Ryan.

Silvio Conti
(Played by Cesare Danova, 1988–89)

An influential mob figure who reveals himself to be Jack Fenelli's actual father.

Dr. Evan Cooper
(Played by Irving Allen Lee, 1985–89)

Doctor at Riverside Hospital. Friend of Patrick Ryan; Romanced Diana Douglas & Chris Hannold. Appeared at Jack & Leigh's wedding on the final episode.

Matthew Crane
(Played by Harve Presnell, 1984)

Wealthy businessman who marries Delia Reid Ryan Ryan Coleridge, and takes her away from New York.

Sam Crowell
(Played by Dennis Jay Higgins, 1976)

Hires Mary Ryan to work at the television station. After finding out he was a potential drug dealer, Nick Szabo orders him to leave Riverside.

== D ==
Dr. Concetta D'Angelo Ryan
(Played by Lois Robbins, 1987–89)

Doctor who helped the student reporters at Wellman College investigate the on-campus murder case.

Mark D'Angelo
(Played by Peter Love, 1986–88)

First of the D'Angelos to appear, beginning in the summer of 1986. A Wellman College student, who becomes friendly with Ryan Fenelli.

Lily Darnell
(Played by Christine Ebersole, 1980; Kathryn Dowling, 1980)

Flightly free-love advocate shared between Roger Coleridge and Barry Ryan.

Mort Dash
(Played by John Sudol, 1981)

Kidnapped Siobhan Ryan Novak and stuffed her into the trunk of a car.

Dan Davis
(Played by George Hearn, 1978; Tom Mason, 1978)

Media reporter. Witness at marriage ceremony of Seneca Beaulac and Jillian Coleridge.

Tom Desmond
(Played by Thomas MacGreevy, 1977–79)

Irish immigrant who tried to pursue Mary Ryan and later courted Faith Coleridge.

Liam Donahue
(Played by James Rogan, 1977–78)

Brother of Tom Desmond's deceased Irish girlfriend. Liam stalked Tom from Ireland and tried to kill him, dying instead himself.

Teresa "Terry" Donahue
(Played by Dianne Thompson, 1979)

Tom Desmond's deceased Irish girlfriend who appears in dream sequences and in hallucinations when Tom becomes ill.

Diana Douglas
(Played by Tracey Ross, 1986–87)

Assistant D.A., and originally, girlfriend of Evan Cooper. Eventually becomes girlfriend of Frank Ryan.

Mr. Homer Dowd
(Played by Keith Charles, 1986–89)

Butler hired by Maggie Shelby after her marriage to Roger Coleridge. Became Roger's voice of reason in various dilemmas.

Chantal DuBujak
(Played by Marisa Pavan, 1985)

Max DuBujak's mother.

Gabrielle DuBujak
(Played by Susan Scannell, 1985)

First wife of Max Dubujak. Kept in a sanitarium in France against her will until her escape in 1985.

Jacqueline DuBujak Novak
(Played by Gerit Quealy, 1983–85, 1987)

Briefly married to Joe Novak, in between Joe's romances with Siobhan Ryan.

Max DuBujak
(Played by Daniel Pilon, 1983–87, 1988)

A crime lord in New York; had a daughter, Jacqueline, who was married to Joe Novak.

== E ==
Earl
(Played by Vito D'Amico, 1978)

Father Emmerich
(Played by David Purdham, 1981–85)

== F ==
Monsignor Farrell
(Played by William Hickey, 1985)

Counseled Johnny in private confessionals during his discovery of Dakota Smith and his threatened marriage to Maeve.

Beryl Feldman
(Played by Anna Berger, 1979)

Wife of David Feldman and mother of Nancy.

Dave Feldman
(Played by Joseph Leon, 1977–79; Arthur Hammer, 1979)

Nancy Feldman
(Played by Lisa Sutton, 1978; Megan McCracken, 1978; Nana Visitor, 1978–79)

She and Dr. Patrick Ryan dated.

Jack Fenelli
(Played by Michael Levin, 1975–89)

He was married first to Mary Ryan and then to Leigh Kirkland. He was the father of Ryan Fenelli. He was close to Sister Mary Joel, who was later revealed to be his mother.

Ryan Fenelli
(Played by Kerry McNamara, 1977–80; Jenny Rebecca Dweir, 1980–84; Yasmine Bleeth, 1985–89)

She married Rick Hyde.

Flash
(Played by Melcourt Poux, 1984–85)

Flash was one of the young employees at Greenberg's Deli.

Dan Fox
(Played by Peter Ratray, 1979–81)

Dan Fox was Delia Reid Ryan Coleridge's stockbroker. He tried to blackmail Delia into having an affair.

Ethyl Franklin
(Played by Alaina Reed, 1983)

== G ==
Miriam George
(Played by Rosetta LeNoire, 1977; Frances Foster, 1977–78; Minnie Gentry, 1979)

Coleridge family nanny who helped raise Jillian, Faith and Roger. Edmund Strong Coleridge's nanny.

Ramona Gonzalez, R.N.
(Played by Rosalinda Guerra, 1975)

Nurse at Riverside Hospital. (This role was originally intended to be played by Sasha von Schuller, the wife of the co-creator and co-producer.)

Nurse Grady
(Played by Lenka Peterson 1981)

Riverside Hospital preemie nurse when Arley Rae Beaulac was born.

Antoine Graham
(Played by Antoine Robinson, 1988–89)

Member of Zena Brown's singing group, cited as a suspect in the attack of Robert Rowan.

Ken Graham
(Played by Corbin Bernsen, 1983–85)

Ethel Green
(Played by Nell Carter, 1978–79)

Leader of tenant's strike at run-down apartment building owned by Nick Szabo.

Dave Greenberg
(Played by Scott Holmes, 1984–85)

Proprietor of Greenberg's Deli; dated Maggie Shelby.

Charlotte Greer
(Played by Judith Chapman, 1983)

Came to Riverside purporting to be the wife of Frank Ryan, but was actually hired by Rae Woodard to sabotage Frank's political career and abducts him. Her real parents are Una and Neal "Red" MacCurtain, who has harbored a grudge against Maeve Ryan since she spurned him decades earlier in Ireland.

Horace Grimley
(Played by Richard Woods, 1978–79)

Investment broker for both Delia Reid Ryan Coleridge and Johnny Ryan.

== H ==
Emily Hall
(Played by Cynthia Dozier, 1987–88)

Police commissioner who has an affair with Jack Fenelli, while fighting to make Jack a foster father to Zena Brown.

Chris Hannold
(Played by Lydia Hannibal, 1986–88, 1989)

Girlfriend of Dr. Evan Cooper. After she and Evan departed during 1988, both return at the tail end of the series' finale, although neither have lines.

Kimberly Harris
(Played by Kelli Maroney, 1979–81, 1982–83)

Daughter of Rae Woodard. An aspiring actress, she is vivacious and worldly. She had an affair with Michael Pavel, and she was the third wife of Dr. Senneca Boulack.

Hartman
(Played by François Giroday, 1986)

Katherine Hayes
(Played by Barbara Chase, 1981)

Young woman with baby Det. Bauer mistakes for Kimberly Harris

Stamford Hutchinson
(Played by DeVeren Bookwalter, 1983–84)

Bill Hyde
(Played by David Sederholm, 1983–85)

Detective who was partnered with Siobhan Ryan Novak. Older brother of Rick Hyde.

Rick Hyde
(Played by Grant Show, 1984–87)

Younger brother of Bill Hyde, who eventually attends private school with a teenage Ryan Fenelli and dates her. Joins the police force after high school and is promoted to detective. Elopes with Ryan.

== I ==
Denise Idoni
(Played by Gretchen Van Ryper, 1981)

== J ==
Sister Mary Joel
(Played by Sylvia Sidney, 1975–76; Nancy Coleman, 1976; Natalie Priest, 1976–78; Jacqueline Brookes, 1982; Rosemary Prinz, 1988–89)

A local convent nun who advised various members of the community. Upon the character's return to the show in 1988, as played by Rosemary Prinz, Sister Mary Joel is discovered to be the biological mother of Jack Fenelli, a son she had with mob lord Silvio Conti. Her given name, prior to joining the convent, was Angelina.

Ken George Jones
(Played by Trent Jones, 1980)

Internationally famous pop star who steals Jillian Coleridge from Frank Ryan. Managed by Barry Ryan. Fatally ill, he ends his own life in the hospital.

== K ==
Yvonne Kaheel
(Played by Patricia Triana, 1981)

Ari's associate

Amanda Kirkland
(Played by Mary Page Keller, 1982–83; Ariane Munker, 1983)

Catsy Kirkland
(Played by Christine Jones, 1982–83)

Hollis Kirkland
(Llayed by Peter Haskell, 1982–83)

Leigh Kirkland
(Played by Felicity LaFortune, 1983–85, 1988–89)

Daughter of Hollis and Catsy Kirkland, sister of Amanda. Successful publisher who strikes up an affair with Jack Fenelli during her original stint on the show.

Devlin Kowalski
(Played by Leslie Easterbrook, 1985–87)

== L ==
D.J. LaSalle
(Played by Christian Slater, 1985)

High school friend of Ryan Fenelli and Rick Hyde. A rebel of sorts, D.J. was anti-establishment and also considered himself less likely to succeed in comparison to the diligent Ryan, whom he dated briefly.

Steve Latham
(Played by Franc Luz, 1984)

Pursued and kidnapped Delia during her engagement to Matthew Crane.

Craig Le Winter
(Played by Paul Carlin, 1981)

Counseled for alcohol addiction by Dr. Faith Coleridge.

Wes Leonard
(Played by David Rasche, 1978–81)

News reporter rival to Jack Fenelli.

Loraleen Lewis
(Played by Patti Emler, 1985–86)

Nancy Don Lewis
(Played by Maria Pitillo, 1987–89)

Former girlfriend of Ben Shelley, who was brought out to New York by Delia to act as a wedge between Ben and Lizzie Ransome. After unsuccessfully trying to win back Ben, Nancy Don has an affair with Chaz Saybrook.

Poppy Lincoln
(Played by Alexandra Neil 1979)

Tom Desmond's nurse.

Polly Longworth
(Played by Molly McGreevy, 1977–81)

Long-time best friend of Rae Woodard. Was attracted to and dated Lr. Bob Reid.

== M ==
Kevin MacGuinness
(Played by Malachy McCourt, 1975–83, 1988–89)

The bartender at Ryan's.

Teddy Malcolm
(Played by David Bailey, 1988–89)

Head of a local investment firm. Friend of Sherry Rowan, and was Chaz Saybrook's boss.

Malachy Malone
(Played by Regis Philbin, 1987–88)

Influential politician, recruited by Delia, to back Dakota Smith during his 1987 district leader campaign.

Man in the Green Hat
(Played by Harris Laskawy, 1979–80)

Tiso Novotny's hit man who actually killed Mary Ryan.

Evelyn Marchero
(Played by Renée Lippin, 1978, 1979)

Hospital records clerk. Roger charms her to get the records of "Mrs. Brown", an alias Delia used when she miscarried Pat Ryan's child before their wedding.

Dr. Jerry Marcus
(Played by Bryan Clerk, 1981)

Barbara Wilde's doctor

Jumbo Marino
(Played by Fat Thomas, 1975–81)

Jack Fenelli's father figure from Fenelli's youth in the old neighborhood.

Dr. Bernie Marx
(Played by Ron Perlman, 1979)

Sgt. McInerny
(Played by Donald Silva, 1981)

Police officer, telephoned Joe Novak to tell him Siobhan had been found in the car trunk.

Martha McKee
(Played by Tovah Feldshuh, 1976; Dorrie Kavanaugh, 1977)

Rival journalist to Jack Fenelli, with whom he has a brief flirtation and interest prior to his wedding to Mary Ryan, and during a 1977 separation from Mary.

Dr. Alex McLean
(Played by Ed Evanko, 1976–77)

A widower and old army pal of Jack Fenelli. Became a close friend of the Mary and the Ryans.

Father McShane
(Played by John Perkins, 1975–89)

Catholic priest who serves as confessor and spiritual guide to many of the Ryans.

Thomas Mendenhall
(Played by Richard Briggs, 1981–84, 1988–89)

Butler who worked for Spencer Smith and later the Kirkland family.

Fenno Moore
(Played by Casey Biggs, 1988–89)

FBI Agent, transferred from Boston, who worked with Joe Novak in tracking down the wanted Max Dubujak.

Amy Morse
(Played by Kaye de Lancey, 1980)

High school girlfriend of Michael Pavel Jr. They had a child together.

Dr. Clem Moultrie
(Played by Hannibal Penney, Jr., 1975–78)

In the past, lived with the Coleridge family for a while. A brilliant surgeon and good friend to many in Riverside.

Neil Mulcahy
(Played by Robert Stattel, 1988)

Assisted Maeve in running Ryan's Bar while Johnny recovered from a serious heart attack.

Cicero Murphy
(Played by Morgan Freeman, 1981)

Surveillance expert who helped Jack Fenelli secretly videotape Joe Novak's office.

== N ==
Alicia Nieves
(Played by Ana Alicia, 1977–78)

Nurse at Riverside Hospital. Previously worked at a clinic where Delia Ryan Coleridge, under an alias, miscarried Dr. Pat Ryan's child. Dated Bob Reid. Briefly worked as an assistant to Rae Woodard.

Angel Nieves
(Played by Jose Aleman, 1977–78)

Alicia's younger brother. He developed meningitis and was treated by doctor Pat Ryan.

Joe Novak
(Played by Richard Muenz, 1979–80; Roscoe Born, 1981–83, 1988; Michael Hennessy, 1983–84; Walt Willey, 1986–87)

Tiso Novotny's nephew. Arch nemesis of Jack Fenelli. Marries Siobhan Ryan.

Sean Novak
(Played by Danny Tamberelli, 1986–87, 1988–89)

Young son of Siobhan and Joe Novak. After the death of his father in November 1988, Siobhan legally changed his last name to Ryan during the final weeks of the show.

Laslo Novotny
(Played by Fred Burstein, 1983–85, 1986–87)

Cousin of mobster Joe Novak. Fell in love with Siobhan Ryan. Left town with Jacqueline Dubujak in February 1987, after Max supposedly died.

Tiso Novotny
(Played by David Clarke, 1979–80)

Joe Novak's mobster uncle. Tiso had Mary Ryan killed, and gifted Delia Ryan Coleridge with money to open her own restaurant.

Lori Nuzzo
(Played by Ann De Salvo, 1980–81)

Friend of Rose Pearse. Girlfriend of Sal Brooks.

== O ==
Gabriel Orosco
(Played by Joshua Nelson, 1989)

== P ==
Dr. Pagano
(Played by David Faulkner, 1977; Gene Rupert, 1978)

Delia Reid Ryan Coleridge's psychologist.

Anna Pavel
(Played by Joan Loring, 1979–80)

Mother of Michael Pavel, Jr.

Michael Pavel, Jr.
(Played by Michael Corbett, 1979, 1980–81)

His father worked for Tiso Novotny at the docks and was killed by Tiso.

Leonie Peach
(Played by Angela Bassett, 1987)

Matt Pearse
(Played by Tom Aldredge, 1980-81, 1982)

Private detective hired by Jack Fenelli.

Rose Pearse Melina
(Played by Rose Alaio, 1980–81)

Daughter of Matt Pearse and love interest of Jack Fenelli.

Henry Popkin
(Played by Fisher Stevens, 1983)

Mirabelle Posnick
(Played by Ellen March, 1981)

Jack Fenelli's contact at Woodard Enterprises Newspaper Morgue

Preston Post
(Played by Lance Henriksen, 1980)

Temperamental star of stage production.

Sydney Price
(Played by Robin Greer, 1983–85)

Lawrence Prince
(Played by Stefano LoVerso, 1983–84)

Ralph Pugh
(Played by John Rothman, 1981)

Joe Novak's lawyer

== Q ==
Harry Quindy
(Played by Don Amendolia, 1981)

== R ==
Cynthia Ramsey
(Played by Lynnda Ferguson, 1981)

Bartender hired by Joe Novak. Sparked jealousy in Delia.

Harlan Ransome
(Played by Drew Snyder, 1986)

Abusive father of Lizzie Ransome.

Lizzie Ransome Ryan
(Played by Catherine Larson, 1986–89)

Girlfriend, and eventual wife of John Reid Ryan.

Bob Reid
(Played by Earl Hindman, 1975–84, 1988–89)

Lieutenant on the local Riverside police force and former colleague of Frank.

Delia Reid Ryan Ryan Coleridge Crane
(Played by Ilene Kristen, 1975–79, 1982–83, 1986–89; Robyn Millan, 1979; Randall Edwards, 1979–82; Robin Mattson, 1984)

One-time wife of both Frank and Pat Ryan (her high school sweetheart), mother of John Reid Ryan (via Frank) and long lost mother of Ava Jerome. Sister of Bob Reid.

Dr. James Ross
(Played by James Congdon, 1978–81)

Friend of Dr. Seneca Beaulac

Thatcher Ross
(Played by Patrick Horgan, 1978–79)

Georgia Rothschild
(Played by Gloria Cromwell, 1975–83)

Georgia Rothchild is a friend of the Ryan family. Initially on the show, she was a campaign worker in Frank Ryan's political campaign.

Jonas Roving
(Played by Michael Wagner, 1981)

Museum curator, and knows Aristotle Benedict White

Richard Rowan
(Played by Lewis Arlt, 1987–88)

Married politician who makes a play for Emily Hall, who turns him down due to her commitment to Jack Fenelli.

Robert Rowan
(Played by Michael Palance, 1988–89)

Son of Sherry Rowan, who has an affair with Delia and is also used by her as a way to get back at ex-husband Roger.

Sherry Rowan
(Played by Diana van der Vlis, 1987–89)

Widow of murdered politician Richard Rowan, who arrived to be at odds with Commissioner Emily Hall, a suspect in Richard's murder.

George Russell
(Played by Lee Wallace, 1981)

Television producer of hospital drama The Proud and the Passionate who hired Seneca Beaulac as a script consultant.

Barry Ryan
(Played by Richard Backus, 1980–81)

Elizabeth Jane "E.J." Ryan
(Played by Maureen Garrett, 1981–82)

Elizabeth Shrank Ryan
(Played by Pamela Blair, 1980)

Barry Ryan's ex-wife

Francis "Frank" Ryan
(Played by Michael Hawkins, 1975–76; Andrew Robinson, 1976–78; Daniel Hugh Kelly, 1978–81; Geoffrey Pierson, 1983–85; John Sanderford, 1985–89)

Johnny Ryan
(Played by Bernard Barrow, 1975–89)

Johnny Ryan grew up in an Irish immigrant family New York City; his family was poor and he got involved in bootlegging.

John Reid Ryan
(Played by Jadrien Steele, 1975–85; Jason Adams, 1986–89)

John Reid Ryan is the son of Frank Ryan and Delia Reid.

Kathleen Ryan Thompson
(Played by Nancy Reardon, 1976–80)

Kathleen was the oldest daughter of Johnny and Maeve Ryan.

Maeve Colleary Ryan
(Played by Helen Gallagher, 1975–89)

Maeve Colleary Ryan grew up in county Cork, Ireland.

Mary Ryan Fenelli
(Played by Kate Mulgrew, 1975–78, 1983, 1986, 1989; Mary Carney, 1978; Kathleen Tolan, 1978–79; Nicolette Goulet, 1979)

(In flashbacks of her childhood shown in 1977, Mary was portrayed by Yvette Deas.)

Owen "Owney" Ryan
(Played by Jamie O'Neill, 1987–89)

Young son of John Reid Ryan and Lizzie Ransome Ryan. First appeared as an infant in August 1986, played by various sets of twins; in the fall of 1987, once Owney was over a year old and speaking his first words, Jamie O'Neill played the role full time.

Dr. Patrick Ryan
(Played by Malcolm Groome, 1975–78, 1983–88, 1989; John Blazo, 1978–79; Robert Finoccoli, 1979; Patrick James Clarke, 1982–83)

Siobhan Ryan Novak
(Played by Sarah Felder, 1978–80; Ann Gillespie, 1981–82; Marg Helgenberger, 1982–86; Carrell Myers, 1986–87; Barbara Blackburn, 1988–89)

== S ==
Chaz Saybrook
(Played by Brian McGovern, 1987–89)

Preppy, wealthy Wellman College student, originally from the Midwest.

Catie Schall
(Played by Elaine Bromka, 1987)

Environmental researcher who lured Ryan into her attack at the Meredith Drake Company.

Marian "Schultzie" Schultz
(Played by Vera Lockwood, 1980–82)

Personal assistant to Rae Woodard, briefly shared in that capacity with Michael Pavel.

Mrs. Shaw
(Played by Betty Low, 1981)

Babysitter hired by Maeve Ryan.

Ben Shelby (aka Ben Shelley)
(Played by James Wlcek, 1987–89)

Son of Bess Shelby, brother of Maggie Shelby. A painter who had disdain for rich people, and often clashed with the Coleridges and Ryans.

Bess Shelby
(Played by Gloria DeHaven, 1983–87)

Mother of Ben and Maggie Shelby, as well as the mother of Jillian Coleridge.

Maggie Shelby
(Played by Cali Timmins, 1983–88, 1989)

Daughter of Bess Shelby, sister of Ben Shelley (Shelby).

Pru Shephard
(Played by Traci Lin, 1984–85)

Betty Sherman
(Played by Betty Alley, 1985–86)

Eliot Silverstein
(Played by Joe Silver, 1980)

Rae Woodard's wealthy, influential friend in the entertainment business, who got her daughter Kimberly her first acting job.

Howard Slavin
(Played by David Gale, 1981)

Barbara Wilde's attorney

Constance Small, R.N.
(Played by Ethel Ayler, 1980–81)

Riverside nurse. Hired by Seneca Beaulac to take care of Arley Rae Beaulac.

Dakota Smith (Ryan)
(Played by Christopher Durham, 1985–88)

Illegitimate son of Johnny Ryan, who was the product of an extramarital affair Johnny had in the 1950s.

Spencer Smith
(Played by Lester Rawlins, 1981)

Museum owner. Hired Jillian Coleridge as his attorney.

Samuel Addison Snow
(Played by John Seitz, 1979)

Political crony of Rae Woodard who made a deal with Rae behind Frank Ryan's back to get him nominated to the Vice Presidency in return for favors.

Sgt. Jim Speed
(Played by MacKenzie Allen, 1981–82)

Police officer who processes Siobhan Ryan Novak's application for the police academy. Friend of Frank Ryan's from his police academy days.

Matthew Strand
(Played by Steve Fletcher, 1988–89)

One-time ex of Leigh Kirkland, who fought to get her back when she announced her engagement to Jack Fenelli.

Nick Szabo
(Played by Michael Fairman, 1975–76, 1977)

Local shady character, loan shark, slum landlord. Had Dr. Roger Coleridge beaten up for loan debts. Old friend of Johnny Ryan.

Serena "Reenie" Szabo
(Played by Julia Barr, 1976)

Daughter of Nick Szabo; drug used; attracted to Dr. Bucky Carter.

== T ==
Dr. Gloria Tassky
(Played by Francine Tacker, 1985)

Pamela Thatcher
(Played by Ellen Barber, 1981)

Younger actress on The Proud and the Passionate television show

Art Thompson
(Played by Gregory Abels, 1976)

Husband of Kathleen Ryan Thompson, father of Deirdre and Maura "Katie" Thompson. He sells insurance.

Deirdre Thompson
(Played by Rachel Robinson, 1976)

Daughter of Kathleen Ryan Thompson and Art Thompson, sister of Maura "Katie".

Katie Thompson
(Played by Lauren O'Bryan, 1984; Julia Campbell, 1984–85)

Daughter of Kathleen Ryan Thompson and Art Thompson. Sister of Deirdre. Her real name is Maura, but she prefers to be called Katie.

Daniel Thorne
(Played by Chip Zien, 1981)

A producer on The Proud and the Passionate television show

== V ==
Alexei Vartova
(Played by Dominic Chianese, 1981; Leonardo Cimino, 1982)

Criminal godfather type, rival to Joe Novak. Grandfather to Rose Pearse Melina's daughter Amelia.

Detective Vaughan
(Played by Mark Werheim, 1987–88)

Vinnie Vincent
(Played by Sherman Howard, 1986–87)

== W ==
Denny Walston
(Played by Lauren K. Woods, 1985–86)

Melinda Weaver Ryan
(Played by Nancy Valen, 1985–87)

Dated Pat Ryan. Died of a terminal illness (in Pat's arms) in May 1987.

Marshall Westheimer
(Played by William Kiehl, 1975–83; Robert Burr, 3 episodes 1977–79)

Administrator of Riverside Hospital.

Aristotle Benedict White
(Played by Gordon Thomson, 1981–82)

Archaeologist

Barbara Wilde
(Played by Judith Barcroft, 1981–82)

Actress on hospital drama The Proud and the Passionate television show. Consults with Seneca Beaulac about her character's disease.

Nurse Williams
(Played by Anne Churchill, 1981)

Admitting nurse at Riverside

Jeremy Winthrop
(Played by Herb Anderson, 1984–85)

Bill Wolfston
(Played by Seth Allen, 1981; Stephen Vinovich, 1981)

Director on The Proud and the Passionate television show

Perry Wood
(Played by Frank Biancamano, 1981)

FBI man who works with Jack Fenelli and Joe Novak

Rae Woodard
(Played by Louise Shaffer, 1977–84, 1989; Judith McGilligan, May 1978)

Widow of William Price Woodard. Took over his publishing empire. Mother of Kimberly Harris, one-time mother-in-law of Seneca Beaulac. Briefly engaged to Frank Ryan and one-time lover of Roger Coleridge.

William Price Woodard
(Played by Wesley Addy, 1977–78)

Husband of Rae Woodard. Dies in the hospital and leaves Rae with an empire to run.
