= Randall Edwards =

Randall Edwards may refer to:

- Randall Edwards (actress) (born 1955), American television actress
- Randall Edwards (politician) (born 1961), American politician
