= Felicity LaFortune =

American actress

Felicity LaFortune is an American actress and singer from Oak Park, Illinois. She has appeared in numerous theatre productions, including on Broadway, as well as in film and on television, including the daytime soap operas Ryan's Hope and All My Children.

== Career ==
On the daytime soap operas Ryan's Hope, LaFortune had the role of Leigh Kirkland Fenelli (1983–1985, 1988–1989) and in All My Children had the role of Laurel Banning Dillon (1993–1996). In 2000, LaFortune filled in for Hillary B. Smith as Nora Buchanan on One Life to Live while Smith was on leave.

In 1987, LaFortune played the role of the nurse in the Broadway production of the play A Month of Sundays. In 1998, she was a singer in The Harlot's Progress at the Performing Garage in SoHo. In 2006, she appeared again on Broadway in the musical The Light in the Piazza. She also played several characters in the trilogy of plays, The Coast of Utopia, at the Lincoln Center Theater in 2006 and 2007. In 2009, she performed in Deathtrap and The Glass Menagerie on Broadway, followed by I Hate Hamlet in 2010. Her other Broadway appearances include Stevie (standby) in The Goat, or Who Is Sylvia? In 2015, she played the role of Peg in The Outgoing Tide, and was nominated for an IRNE Award for her performance.

== Filmography ==
=== Film ===
Year	Title	Role	Notes
1991	All I Want for Christmas	Susan	
2008	Dream Date (Short)	Jane's Sister #2	

=== Television ===
Year	Title	Role	Notes
1983 – 1985, 1988 – 1989	Ryan's Hope	Leigh Kirkland	
1988	Crossbow	Lady Montal	Episode: "Ladyship"
1989	L.A. Law	Leah Adair	Episode: "Lie Down and Deliver"
1989–1990	Thirtysomething	Valerie Milgrom	Episode: "The Legacy" Episode: "Once a Mermaid" Episode: "Her Cup Runneth Over"
1990	Murphy Brown	Greta	Episode: "The 390th Broadcast"
1990	Midnight Caller	Alix Albright	Episode: "The Class of 1980"
1991	DEA	Valerie	Episode: "The Fat Lady Sings Alone"
1993 – 1996	All My Children	Laurel Banning	
1996	ER	Annette Lucas	Episode: "John Carter, M.D."
1999	Sex and the City	Sandy Cranwell	Episode: "Four Women and a Funeral"
2000	One Life to Live	Nora Buchanan	3 episodes (March 17, 20, 21); stand-in for Hillary B. Smith
2000	Law & Order	Dr. Liz Alden	Episode: "Endurance"
2004	The Sopranos	Dr. Sarah Klum	Episode: "Long Term Parking"
2006	Live from Lincoln Center	Tour Guide / Ensemble	Episode: "The Light in the Piazza"

=== Theatre - Broadway ===
Year	Title	Role	Location
1987	A Month of Sundays	Nurse Wilson	Ritz Theatre
1996	Sex and Longing	Lulu (Standby)	Cort Theatre
2002	The Goat, or Who Sylvia?	Stevie (Standby)	John Golden Theatre
2005	The Light in the Piazza	Tour Guide/Ensemble Signora Naccarelli (Understudy)	Lincoln Center Theater at the Vivian Beaumont
2006	The Coast of Utopia (Part 1: Voyage)	Masha Miss Chamberlain (Understudy) Mrs. Beyer (Understudy) Varvara (Understudy)	Lincoln Center Theater at the Vivian Beaumont
2006	The Coast of Utopia (Part 2: Shipwreck)	Marianne on the Barricades Rosa Madame Haag (Understudy) Maria Ogarev (Understudy)	Lincoln Center Theater at the Vivian Beaumont
2007	The Coast of Utopia (Part 3: Salvage)	Maria Fomm Mrs. Blainey (Understudy)	Lincoln Center Theater at the Vivian Beaumont
2017	Six Degrees of Separation	Ouisa (Understudy) Kitty (Understudy)	Ethel Barrymore Theatre
