= Michael Fairman =

American actor and writer

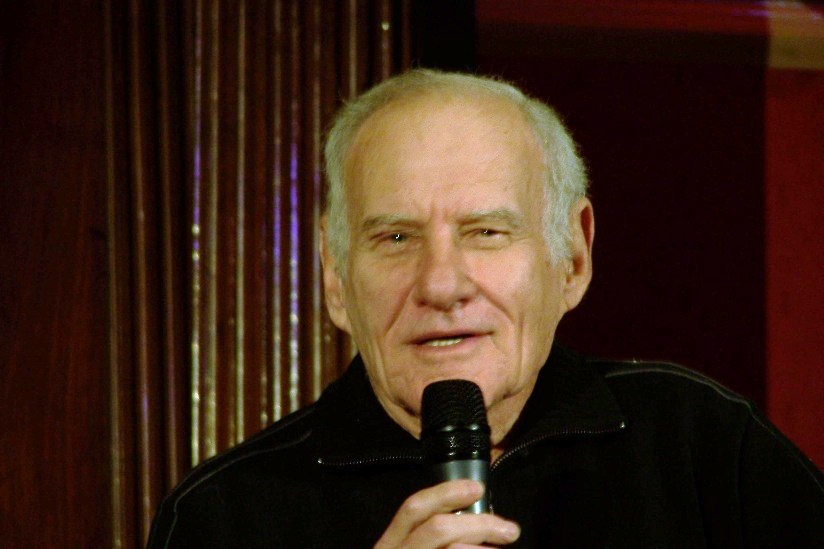
- Fairman in 2007
- Born: February 25, 1934 (age 92); New York City, New York, U.S.
- Occupations: Actor, writer
- Years active: 1965–present
- Height: 5 ft 10 1/2 in (1.791 m)
- Spouse: Joy Graysen

Michael Fairman (born February 25, 1934) is an American actor and writer.

== Career ==
He is best known for his various roles during his long career. This includes the role of Nick Szabo on the daytime drama, Ryan's Hope, his recurring role as Department Inspector Knelman on Cagney & Lacey, and the recurring role of Patrick Murphy on the CBS daytime drama, The Young and the Restless.

Additional television credits include, Charlie's Angels, Eight Is Enough, Barnaby Jones, Taxi, WKRP in Cincinnati, McClain's Law, Knight Rider, The A-Team, Remington Steele, Hill Street Blues, The Dukes of Hazzard, Newhart, 21 Jump Street, Dynasty, Night Court, My Two Dads, Quantum Leap, Cheers, Wings, Murder, She Wrote, Mad About You, Alien Nation, Seinfeld, L.A. Law, ER, Murphy Brown, Brooklyn South, The X-Files, Viper, Providence, Boy Meets World, Sunset Beach, Family Law, Boston Public, The King of Queens, Dharma & Greg, JAG, Firefly, Judging Amy, Just Shoot Me!, 7th Heaven, Without a Trace, Ghost Whisperer, Medium, Sons of Anarchy, Monk.

He also appeared in the films Thirteen Days as United States Ambassador to the United Nations Adlai Stevenson II, and Mulholland Drive in a supporting role as Jason, and in Father Stu as a churchgoer named Randall.

He also wrote five episodes of WKRP in Cincinnati.

== Personal life ==
Fairman was a longtime member of the Church of Scientology. He was featured in several promotional Scientology training films and eventually reached the OT VII level. Fairman left the church in January 2011, around the time he was declared a "Suppressive Person".
