= Hannibal Penney =

Hannibal Penney was born in Chattanooga, Tennessee. He spent many years performing in films, Shakespearean plays and as a regular on Ryan's Hope. He co-starred alongside William F. McGaha in the 1972 biker film J.C. where he played the part of David Little, a black biker.

He is mostly known to TV viewers as Dr. Clem Moultrie, the tall and handsome neurosurgeon in Ryan's Hope, a role he played from 1975 to 1978.

== Interview ==
- http://ryansbaronline.tripod.com/penneysod77.html
