= Nicolette Goulet =

Canadian-American actress

- Born: June 5, 1956; Toronto, Ontario, Canada
- Died: April 17, 2008 (aged 51); Las Vegas, Nevada, US
- Occupation: Actress
- Years active: 1979–1993
- Spouse: Tim Fowlar (m. 1992; div.)
- Children: 3

Nicolette Goulet (June 5, 1956 – April 17, 2008) was a Canadian-American film, television and musical theatre actress.

== Biography ==
Goulet was born in Toronto, Ontario, Canada, the only child of singer-actor Robert Goulet and his first wife, Louise Longmore. She had two half-brothers, Christopher and Michael, from her father's second marriage, to singer-actress Carol Lawrence. Goulet was educated at Marymount Manhattan College in New York City, where she starred in several plays, but left after one semester. At age 18, she landed the role of Corey in a production of Barefoot in the Park.

From there she went on to the television soap opera Ryan's Hope, playing Mary Ryan Fenelli in 1979. She was the fourth actress to portray the character. She also appeared on three other such daytime serialized drama: Search for Tomorrow as Kathy Parker Phillips Taper #2 from 1980 until 1982; As the World Turns as Casey Reynolds in 1984; and Guiding Light as Meredith Reade Bauer from 1987 to 1989.

She starred in two motion pictures, Whispers of White and Calhoun County, and in the Off-Off-Broadway play Sweet Song of the Trumpets. Other theater roles included a Baltimore, Maryland, production of Lillian Hellman's Another Part of the Forest in 1984, and the musicals I Love My Wife (1982, The Little Theatre on the Square, Sullivan, Illinois) and Romantic Comedy (1982).

== Personal life ==
On April 17, 2008, less than six months after her father's death, Goulet died in Las Vegas, Nevada, as a result of breast cancer. At the time of her death, she was divorced from husband Tim Fowlar, whom she had married on August 30, 1992. She had three children: Jordan, Solange and Dee.
