= The Haunting of Sarah Hardy =

1989 American horror film

- Video box artwork
- Genre: Horror
- Based on: The Crossing by Jim Flanagan
- Screenplay by: Thomas Baum
- Directed by: Jerry London
- Starring: Sela Ward; Roscoe Born; Polly Bergen; Morgan Fairchild
- Theme music composer: Michel Rubini
- Country of origin: United States
- Original language: English

Production
- Producers: Salli Newman; Richard Luke Rothschild
- Production locations: Portland, Oregon; North Coast, Oregon
- Cinematography: Bojan Bazelli
- Editor: Bernard Gribble
- Running time: 92 minutes
- Production company: Paramount Television

Original release
- Network: USA Network
- Release: May 31, 1989

The Haunting of Sarah Hardy is a 1989 American made-for-television horror film directed by Jerry London and starring Sela Ward, Morgan Fairchild, Roscoe Born, Michael Woods, and Polly Bergen. The film aired on the USA Network on May 31, 1989.

== Cast ==
- Sela Ward as Sarah Hardy
- Roscoe Born as Allen deVineyn
- Polly Bergen as Emily Stepford
- Morgan Fairchild as Lucy
- Michael Woods as Austin Hardy
- Charles Bernard as Uncle Neddy
- Vana O'Brien as Aunt Caroline

== Production ==
Filming took place in Portland, Oregon, at the Pittock Mansion.

== Release ==
The Haunting of Sarah hardy was distributed on home video by CIC in the United Kingdom in December 1989.

== Critical response ==
Irv Letofsky of the Los Angeles Times wrote of the film: "The thing about suspense is that the characters can be dumb and the plot can be muddled and the whole production can be awkwardly filmed and sometimes it can still work. But if there's no passion in the playing and it all lies there flat and deadly and every twist and turn of the story is predictable by a mile, then there's not much fun and surprise left."

John Stark of People wrote: "The hokey plot, with its ending right out of When a Stranger Calls, could be excused if the characters weren’t so one-dimensional. There’s no sense of locale, either. Although filmed in and around Portland, Ore., it could be Anywhere, U.S.A. There is one old-fashioned quality we can be thankful for: It isn’t violent."
