= Gerit Quealy =

American writer, editor, and actor

Gerit Ann Quealy
- Born: 20 October 1960 (age 66); Norfolk, Virginia, United States
- Status: single
- Occupations: writer, editor, Shakespearean scholar
- Notable credit(s): The New York Times (publications); Wedding Flowers, Wedding Cakes and Flowers (as co-author); Fifty Things To Do When You Turn Fifty (as an editor)

Gerit Quealy is an American writer, editor, and actor.

She is the co-author of Wedding Flowers (2003) and Wedding Cakes and Flowers (2006), and an editor of Fifty Things to Do When You Turn Fifty (2005).

Quealy has also written for the Vows column of The New York Times, as well as the Style desk of the Times.

Quealy was formerly a Wilhelmina model and an associate editor of Flair magazine. From 1983 to 1985 (and briefly in 1987), she played Jacqueline Dubujak Novak on the ABC daytime serial Ryan's Hope.

== Shakespearean scholarship ==
Quealy is a Shakespearean scholar and an adherent of the Oxfordian theory of Shakespeare authorship.

== Bibliography ==
- With Allison Kyle Leopold. Wedding Flowers. New York: Hearst, 2003. ISBN 1-58816-093-9 ISBN 978-1-58816-093-5
- With Kathleen Hackett and Allison Kyle Leopold. Wedding Cakes and Flowers. New York: Hearst, 2006. ISBN 1-58816-615-5 ISBN 978-1-58816-615-9

=== As editor ===
- Ronnie Sellers, Gerit Quealy, Debra Gordon, Brian O'Connell, Sarah Mahoney and Allison Kyle Leopold. Fifty Things to Do When You Turn Fifty. Sellers Publishing, 2005. ISBN 1-56906-590-X ISBN 978-1-56906-590-7
