= J.C. (film) =

- Theatrical release poster
- Directed by: William F. McGaha
- Screenplay by: William F. McGaha; Joe Thirty
- Story by: William F. McGaha; Joe Thirty
- Produced by: William F. McGaha
- Starring: William F. McGaha; Hannibal Penney; Joanna Moore; Burr DeBenning; Slim Pickens; Pat Delaney
- Cinematography: Jerry Crowder
- Edited by: Avrum M. Fine
- Music by: Paul Jarvis
- Production company: Wilmac International
- Distributed by: AVCO Embassy Pictures
- Release date: April 1, 1972
- Running time: 99 minutes
- Country: United States
- Language: English

J.C. is a 1972 American action film directed by William F. McGaha and written by William F. McGaha and Joe Thirty. The film stars William F. McGaha, Hannibal Penney, Joanna Moore, Burr DeBenning, Slim Pickens and Pat Delaney. The film was released on April 1, 1972, by AVCO Embassy Pictures.

== Cast ==
- William F. McGaha as J.C. Masters
- Hannibal Penney as David Little
- Joanna Moore as Miriam Wages
- Burr DeBenning as Dan Martin
- Slim Pickens as Grady Caldwell
- Pat Delaney as Kim McKool
- Judy Frazier as Rachel Myers
- Max Payne as Mr. Clean
- Conrad Peavey as Hunter
- Matthew Gart as Carlton Wages
- Brenda Sutton as Neffie
- Carol Hall as Shirley 'The Saint'
- Byron Warner as Disciple
- Bob Corley as D.J. Nabors
- Bud Allen as Beaver
- Simone Griffith as Harriet 'The Hare'
- Bill Chapman as Foreman
- Beverly Littles as Panama Red
- Gracia Deen as M Y Bird
- Mike Vann as Ben Wages
- Steve Brown as Charles
- Howard Lynch as Von Wheelie
