= Ryan's Hope =

Television series

- Created by: Claire Labine; Paul Avila Mayer
- Starring: List of cast
- Country of origin: United States
- No. of seasons: 13
- No. of episodes: 3,515

Production
- Executive producers: Claire Labine (1975–82); Paul Avila Mayer (1975–82); Ellen Barrett (1982–83); Joseph Hardy (1983–88); Felicia Minei Behr (1988–89)
- Running time: 30 minutes
- Production companies: Labine-Mayer Productions (1975–79); American Broadcasting Companies, Inc. (1979–89)

Original release
- Network: ABC
- Release: July 7, 1975 – January 13, 1989

Related
- General Hospital

Ryan's Hope is an American soap opera created by Claire Labine and Paul Avila Mayer, airing for 13 years on ABC from July 7, 1975, to January 13, 1989. It revolves around the trials and tribulations within a large Irish-American family in the Washington Heights neighborhood of Manhattan, New York City.

== Origins ==
In late 1974, ABC Daytime approached Claire Labine and Paul Avila Mayer, the head writers of CBS' Love of Life, about creating a new soap opera similar to General Hospital. Labine and Mayer added a large Irish-American family — the Ryans — to what ABC was calling City Hospital. Another of the show's working titles was A Rage to Love, but that was soon changed.

Patriarch Johnny Ryan (Bernard Barrow) owned a bar, Ryan's, across from fictional Riverside Hospital in New York City. His wife, Maeve (Helen Gallagher), assisted him in his duties, as did their children: Frank, the seldom-seen Kathleen, Patrick, Mary, and Siobhan (the younger daughter being introduced in the series in 1978, having spent the first three years of the series away from New York City). The Ryans and the wealthy Coleridges were the original core families of the show. The soap took the then-unusual approach of situating itself in an actual community—the Washington Heights neighborhood of Upper Manhattan. Maeve's parish sat in the shadow of the George Washington Bridge, on 178th St. References were often made to Central Park (Delia's Crystal Palace restaurant), Sheepshead Bay in Brooklyn (mob-owned fishing boats), and other localities to provide a sense of place. "We wanted to show how New York has communities," Labine said.

Labine and Mayer also served as the executive producers of the show at this point, with George Lefferts as the producer. Lefferts was soon replaced by Robert Costello, who remained with the show until 1978. Nancy Ford co-wrote the first episode with Labine and Mayer.

The original cast consisted of Nancy Addison Altman, Bernard Barrow, Faith Catlin, Justin Deas, Michael Fairman, John Gabriel, Helen Gallagher, Michael Levin, Malcolm Groome, Rosalinda Guerra, Ron Hale, Michael Hawkins, Earl Hindman, Ilene Kristen, Frank Latimore, Kate Mulgrew, Hannibal Penney, Jr., and Diana van der Vlis.

The premise of the show for its first two years involved the blue-collar, immigrant, Catholic Ryans and the three of their five upwardly mobile adult children still residing in New York: Frank, lawyer and aspiring local politician; Pat, physician at local Riverside Hospital; and Mary, aspiring journalist. The show contrasted the cultures of tradition-minded parents with their more liberated, 1970s culture-drenched children. Older morals about lifetime marriages, church-proscribed divorce, and chastity outside of wedlock were constantly being tested by "New-World," "New-Era" urban values. Frank's political campaign for city council was challenged by a chain of events surrounding his paying off the Coleridge son who knew of the affair Frank was having with Jillian Coleridge, while Frank was married to needy, frantic Delia. The political-scandal angle was soon reiterated with Frank's short tenure in the state senate. Delia became involved with all three of Johnny Ryan's sons: Frank, Pat, and Dakota. The quasi-incestuous focus was echoed in coming years by Frank's involvement with both Coleridge sisters, Jillian and Faith, and with Faith's involvement with Ryan brothers Pat and Frank, and again with Jillian's involvement with half-brothers Frank and Dakota, and by gangster Michael Pavel's involvement with New York publisher/Frank's ex-fiancée Rae Woodward (Louise Shaffer) and her teen daughter, Kim (Kelli Maroney). Mary became irresistibly attracted to a reporter exposing Frank's blackmailing scandal, the fiery Jack Fenelli, and eventually moved in with him without benefit of marriage.

These extramarital and premarital affairs, the attendant children out of wedlock, the career-oriented women, the assertion of abortion rights: the clash of generational values in the Ryan clan was interesting to viewers (akin in some respects to the "Archie-Meathead" conflicts in the famed primetime show All in the Family), and there developed a passionate following for Kate Mulgrew's portrayal of Mary Ryan. Mary's career and personal goals were given neurotic counterpoint in Delia's machinations with Mary's brothers.

== Show in transition ==
After two years of growth and success, Ryan's Hope began encountering challenges. Michael Hawkins left the role of Frank Ryan in 1976, and subsequent replacements included Andrew Robinson (1976–1978), Daniel Hugh Kelly (1978–1981), Geoffrey Pierson (1983–1985), and John Sanderford (1985–1989). In late 1977, Kate Mulgrew announced she would be leaving in January 1978. Following Mulgrew's departure, three different actresses, Mary Carney, Kathleen Tolan, and Nicolette Goulet, played Mary. It was Goulet who was in the role when story writers Labine and Mayer decided to kill off the character in December 1979. The writers initially wanted to kill off Mary when Mulgrew announced her decision to leave but ABC refused to allow the popular character to be killed off. Mary's sister, Siobhan, was brought to town to become romantically involved with a man, Joe Novak, who turned out to be a mobster, a storyline that offed Mary in a grisly bludgeoning murder when she and Jack were investigating the mafia ties of the fiancé. Malcolm Groome chose to leave the role of Dr. Pat Ryan in 1978 and was replaced with John Blazo (1978–1979), Robert Finoccoli (1979), and Patrick James Clarke (1982–1983).

Other characters not related to the Ryans were also recast. After Ilene Kristen left in January 1979, the role of Delia Reid was played by Robyn Millan (1979), Randall Edwards (1979–1982), and Robin Mattson (1984); Kristen returned to the show in the role from 1982 to 1983 (when she was fired due to weight gain) and 1986–1989. After Faith Catlin was dropped from the show as Faith Coleridge in May 1976, she was replaced with Nancy Barrett (1976), Catherine Hicks (1976–1978), and Karen Morris-Gowdy (1978–1983, 1989). Richard Muenz originated the role of Joe Novak in 1979, but was replaced by Roscoe Born (1981–1983, 1988), Michael Hennessy (1983–1984), and Walt Willey (1986–1987, with Joe initially under the guise of "Erik Brenner").

Of the major characters not related to the core characters, Louise Shaffer's Rae Woodard had significant impact in storylines, seducing both Roger Coleridge and Frank Ryan who she became engaged to, manipulating a breakup between him and Jillian, whom she despised. After Frank broke off her engagement, Rae plotted to destroy his political career, but eventually, she was exposed. After her illegitimate daughter Kimberly (Kelli Maroney) was introduced, Rae became the focus of many storylines, including having an affair with the much younger Michael Pavel, whom she had hired as her personal assistant, after breaking him and Kimberly up. His murder by the mob ended this triangle and led to Kim's departure and Rae's brief stay on the backburner of the storyline. When the wealthy Kirkland family was written in to glamourize the show, Rae returned to being a lead character. After the Kirklands were written out, Rae became the instigator behind the Charlotte Greer storyline. When Shaffer's contract was not renewed, she appeared on a recurring basis until she joined All My Children to play Goldie Kane. She was later hired by Search for Tomorrow to replace Maree Cheatham where she was reunited with former Ryan's Hope lovers, Michael Corbett (Michael Pavel) and Peter Haskell (Hollis Kirkland).

Among the other characters not related to the Ryans who passed through was the Irish-born Tom Desmond (Thomas MacGreevy), who briefly dated Mulgrew's Mary, then married Faith Coleridge in order to stay in the country. After attempting to kill her due to a brain tumor that caused him to become insanely jealous of her and Pat, Tom was briefly tempted by the innocent Poppy Lincoln (Alexandra Neil, then known as Diane Thompson Neil), who helped him deal with his brief blindness and happened to look almost exactly like his late girlfriend Teresa Donahue (also played by Ms. Neil, who went on to appear on practically every New York-based soap in the next two decades). Desmond managed to last two years before being killed off but other characters were introduced and written out extremely fast.

== Production changes ==
Several things occurred behind the camera as well. The original producer, show business veteran George Lefferts was replaced early in the run by more experienced producer Robert Costello. In 1979, Labine and Mayer sold the show to ABC due to skyrocketing production costs. The storylines following the sale to ABC, took a turn for the surreal. There were take-offs of King Kong, On a Clear Day You Can See Forever, Jaws, Manhattan, The Godfather, and The French Lieutenant's Woman. These were not the type of plots the show had previously been known for. Subsequent interviews with the head writer Claire Labine, however, reveal that the network was not the driving force behind the surrealism: "Everyone always cites Prince Albert the ape story as a mistake. But I'd do that again. I loved those scenes. It was a story about alienation." Just as the King Kong-style plot captured Labine's imagination, so was the Raiders of the Lost Ark-inspired plot concerning a queen mummy inspired by Labine's vacation in Egypt at the time. None were considered plausible-- "the Raiders story... appears neither comfortable nor realistic," not told within a soap's context of real life, just as the King Kong and Jaws plots "were universally criticized."

At the beginning of 1982, ABC fired Labine and Mayer and replaced them with Mary Ryan Munisteri. During Munisteri's tenure as head writer, the focus began to move to the newly arrived wealthy Kirkland clan, which was headed by Hollis Kirkland III (Peter Haskell). It soon turned out that he was the father of Rae Woodard's daughter, Kimberly Harris (Kelli Maroney). As more and more Kirklands began to show up (including Christine Jones as Hollis' wife Catsy; with Mary Page Keller and later Ariane Munker as his daughter Amanda), less attention was paid to the Ryans and Coleridges. Various cast members at this time dubbed the show Kirkland's Hope.

Due to falling ratings, Labine and Mayer were asked back at the beginning of 1983. In addition, at the same time, original cast members Malcolm Groome and Ilene Kristen returned to their roles as Pat Ryan and Delia Reid. In the spring, Kate Mulgrew briefly returned to the role of Mary Ryan when the character was brought back as a ghost who communicates with her widowed beloved Jack and, while professing that she still loves him, urges him to move on with his life. Then, in the summer, classic film actress Gloria DeHaven was hired to play the role of Bess Shelby, a middle-aged woman living out a sad existence in a Washington trailer park until she realizes her long-lost daughter is Jillian Coleridge, who was in the middle of a run for political office. Hungry for money, her teenage daughter Maggie (Cali Timmins) takes the first bus to New York to find Jillian, eventually causing Bess to head east as well. Ratings rose slightly with these developments; however, it was not enough. At the end of 1983, Labine and Mayer were let go again and replaced with General Hospital scribe Pat Falken Smith (with James E. Reilly joining as a staff writer). Smith, along with executive producer Joseph Hardy, once again shifted the focus from the Ryan and Coleridge families. Also in 1983, Ilene Kristen, Louise Shaffer, and Karen Morris-Gowdy were fired. Kristen's character was recast briefly in 1984, played by Robin Mattson. The primary focus of the series during the Hardy-Smith era was on Greenberg's Deli, with Cali Timmins' Maggie Shelby and Scott Holmes' Dave Greenberg becoming two of the main characters.

In 1985, Smith was replaced with Millee Taggart and Tom King. The show began a shift back to its roots during this time. The show, which had been airing at 12:30 Eastern US/11:30 Central since 1977, had just been moved to the Noon Eastern US/11c time slot, beginning October 8, 1984. It appears that many of the cast members felt as though this was a very political move by ABC: since the daytime drama series Loving took over the former 12:30/11:30c Ryan's Hope slot, it allowed creator Agnes Nixon to use her clout with the network (from her lucrative soap operas All My Children and One Life to Live) to get Loving a prime slot. This resulted in her new show commencing a block of back-to-back Nixon shows. Others felt that moving Ryan's Hope out of the 12:30 slot spared it competition from CBS's highly rated The Young and the Restless in the noon timeslot; however, the show went up against the NBC game show Super Password, and both shows would remain in the noon timeslot until their runs ended.

== The final years ==
During the 1980s, there were numerous cast changes. Some of the more notable ones included the additions of Michael Palance, Grant Show, Daniel Pilon, Gerit Quealy, Leslie Easterbrook, Tichina Arnold, Gloria DeHaven, Jimmy Wlcek, Maria Pitillo, Rosemary Prinz, Catherine Larson, and Christopher Durham. Durham arrived in October 1985 as Dakota Smith, who was brought to the Ryan family's attention following Johnny's admission of a tryst he'd had with a woman who stepped in as his caretaker while he was ill, and away from Maeve, in the 1950s. The long-ago weekend of intimacy produced Dakota, who arrived in New York to find out that Johnny was his father. Dakota soon became a rebel on the local scene, engaging in dirty dealings and becoming at odds with Frank, especially after he entered into a romance with Jill, Frank's beloved. Long-term fans were displeased with the storyline involving Johnny's infidelity, and ultimately, Dakota was written out, with Johnny disowning him over his criminal activities. Soap veteran Rosemary Prinz took over the role of Sister Mary Joel, a recurring part played by several actresses since the show's early days (including film actresses Sylvia Sidney and Nancy Coleman), and in a shocking twist, was revealed to be Jack's real mother. Diana Van Der Vlis, who had been part of the show's first year as Seneca's first wife, Nell, returned in a different role, as Sherry Rowan, the widow of the murdered Richard. When Seneca came back, he was shocked by Sherry's resemblance to Nell, and impulsively asked her to marry him. In the final episode, the two were seen together at Jack and Leigh's wedding.

=== Recasts ===
In early 1985, the character of Ryan Fenelli would advance to being approximately 17 years old from the nine-year-old she was currently, as played by Jenny Rebecca Dweir. Newcomer Yasmine Bleeth was hired to become the teenage Ryan, who started only a month or so after Dweir's last appearance in the role in late 1984.

Initially, Bleeth's Ryan Fenelli shared many youth-oriented and high school-themed plots with Grant Show's Rick Hyde and bad boy D.J. LaSalle, as played by then-newcomer Christian Slater. Rick joined the local police force after high school graduation, and eventually fell in love with Ryan. Jack Fenelli was unsupportive of his daughter dating Rick, who tended to live dangerously. In protest, Rick and Ryan ultimately eloped to South Carolina in April 1986. Ryan was approached and assisted at the town hall ceremony by a woman named Maura (Kate Mulgrew), who bore more than a passing resemblance to Ryan's late mother, Mary - strongly suggesting that this was Mary returning yet again in ghostly form. The two were followed and then found by Jack and Frank after the wedding and brought back home, and while Rick and Ryan moved in together, things became more rocky between Ryan and her family.

Later in 1985, Jadrien Steele departed from the role of 10-year-old Johnno Ryan, who was written off-screen. After being called back home to New York by his relatives, following the accidental, near-fatal shooting of his father Frank by Rick Hyde, the now 19-year-old John Reid Ryan surfaced in August 1986, portrayed by Jason Adams for the remainder of the show's run. Johnno returned from attending college in the Pacific Northwest, complete with a baby son, Owen "Owney" Ryan. At first, despite prodding from Johnno's "second mother," Jill Coleridge, and everyone else, details of Owney's mother and the circumstances surrounding his birth were seldom shared by Johnno, until the mother to whom he was not married, Lizzie Ransome (Catherine Larson) arrived sometime later. News of this latest unexpected arrival to the Ryan clan soon brought Ilene Kristen back to the show as Delia, to meet her grandson and to cause more upheaval. Her return on September 8, 1986, which proved to be permanent, opened with the revelation that she had been having financial difficulty – the number one indication that, for once, she had not run off to marry another wealthy bachelor to advance her fortune. Delia's last husband, Matthew Crane (played by Harve Presnell in 1984 during Robin Mattson's brief stint as Delia), had died unexpectedly in the intervening period and left her destitute. She tried to conceal this fact from everyone, but Maggie Shelby successfully exposed her at a Coleridge family dinner. Delia moved in with Johnny, Maeve, and grandson Owney.

Lizzie came to protect John and Owney from her ruthless father, Harlan Ransome (Drew Snyder), who wanted to take the baby and sell him for his own purposes, since he disapproved of such a young couple raising a child. After much hostility towards John and Lizzie, and an attempt to rape Delia, Harlan was bludgeoned to death.

=== Final storylines ===
By early 1987, with ratings sinking ever further, and a number of ABC affiliates dropping the show altogether, ABC asked Claire Labine to return as head writer, with her daughter, Eleanor Labine, as co-head writer. The Labines revitalized the show creatively. A year after Labine's return, executive producer Joseph Hardy was replaced with Felicia Minei Behr.

Lizzie and John found there was true love in their relationship, and the young parents were now able to focus on parenthood. In March 1987, they were engaged. That same month, after successfully taking down Overlord, a local organized crime syndicate that had been terrorizing the Riverside area for almost a year, Siobhan and Joe announced they were leaving New York to seek their fortunes; along with their three-year-old son Sean (Danny Tamberelli), they bid farewell to everyone at the Ryans' annual St. Patrick's Day celebration (aired March 17, 1987). The Novaks would return one last time, in October 1988. Jack, who had been wounded at the scene of the Overlord takedown, met a homeless teenage girl, Zena Brown (Tichina Arnold), while recovering at Riverside. Zena and Jack had a lot in common due to their history on the streets, and upon his release, Jack fought the authorities in order to get Zena placed in a good foster home. Zena spent two months in a foster home with an upwardly-mobile black family, but after numerous attempts to get herself kicked out, Jack convinced the Ryans to take her in, which succeeded after Zena became friendly with Maeve.

On the night of Maggie giving birth to daughter Olivia (Kelly Nevins and Melissa Nevins), in May 1987, her brother Ben Shelby (Jim Wlcek) arrived in town, blowing his cover of Ben Shelley when running into mother Bess (Gloria DeHaven) at a dinner party thrown by her. Lizzie, who had started working for Delia at her art gallery, had bought a painting from Ben, who under both his identities was a struggling artist who despised high society – the very explanation as to why he had been estranged from his family for some time. Ben caused friction with his family and their friends, but ultimately tried to prove himself a local hero when he was the first to witness John Reid Ryan's temporary infidelity to Lizzie. During the investigation of a recent murder at local Wellman College, which John Reid and Ryan were now attending, John fell into bed with Dr. Concetta D'Angelo (Lois Robbins), who had been helping him cover the case for Wellman's newspaper. John Reid and Concetta ended their tryst well before John Reid and Lizzie's wedding date approached, but Delia found out, and had a hard time forgiving her son.

During their wedding day that August, Lizzie was set to marry John, but was whisked away from the church by Ben, who ultimately told her, in private, the truth about John's cheating on her. John and Lizzie tried to reconcile, but Lizzie had a hard time forgiving John, and then admitted that she was falling for Ben. In the aftermath, the couple went back to their respective new love interests and, later, Concetta fell in love with and married Pat Ryan. Rick and Ryan's marriage, which had seen its ups and downs for the year and a half they had been united, took a turn for the worse. Rick walked out on Ryan after she miscarried their baby due to injuries she sustained after walking into a trap at Wellman College and promptly being attacked by thugs from a local chemical company. Wellman reporter Chaz Saybrook (Brian McGovern) and Concetta's brother Mark D'Angelo (Peter Love) were among the many eligible bachelors who vied for Ryan's affection. In September, Dakota started a run for Riverside district leader, with Delia as his campaign manager. To help with finances, Delia contacted influential politician Malachy Malone (played by Regis Philbin, in a rare dramatic role), who agreed to back Dakota. Dee and Malachy's professional, and at times personal, relationship lasted throughout the entire campaign. Dakota won in November, but once in office, engaged in several bribes that could have threatened his leadership. One of these bribes, in which he helped retrieve EKG scans of mobster Augie Price, who had just died after being targeted as an accomplice in the Meredith Drake Company scandal, actually enhanced his career. Jack and Pat took the scans to court, which prevented the case from going to trial.

Since the spring of 1987, Jack had found himself in a blossoming affair with Commissioner Emily Hall (Cynthia Dozier), who had been Zena's official social worker. As their relationship evolved, Emily was pursued by politician Richard Rowan, who was married. Emily fought to keep Richard away in order to not jeopardize her devotion to Jack, but ended up being in the wrong place at the wrong time when she walked into Richard's apartment just as he was lying dead on the floor. She was then cited as a suspect in his murder. Emily hired a very pregnant Jill to represent her. Jill also had her hands full, focusing on her new baby with Frank, and counseling a determined Ryan to accept the fact that Rick was through with marriage, so a divorce could proceed. In early December, she gave birth to a girl, who bore the name of Mary Ryan, in an essence making the family dynamic complete again in the late Mary's honor.

In January 1988, original cast member Nancy Addison Altman left the series after nearly 13 years. A few months later, Malcolm Groome left the series again. Although both actors later returned for the final episodes, their departures and the show's eventual conclusion made Bernard Barrow, Helen Gallagher, Ron Hale and Michael Levin the only original cast members to stay with the show for its entire run. Shortly after, the 1988 Writers Guild of America strike took place, which affected the show's writing and ratings even further. Despite the strike ending in August 1988, ABC announced Ryan's Hope's cancellation in October of that year. As Bernard Barrow told Good Morning America on January 10, 1989, the show's Nielsen numbers were still openly revealed to cast and crew until Ryan's Hope fell to dead last in the daytime ratings during the 1987–1988 TV season. Thereafter, "a lid was tightened" according to Barrow, and the show's now-12th (13th the following year) place ranking was harder to obtain from the insiders. The final episode (#3515) on January 13, 1989, concluded with Helen Gallagher's Maeve singing "Danny Boy", as she had for many previous Ryan celebrations. For the final episodes, numerous cast members who had been on the show in previous years returned.

Soon after the show's end, the then-current and last version of the Ryan's Bar set was modified and then used on One Life to Live, where it was used for the next few years as a bar/club in Llanview. Coincidentally, both Ryan's Hope and One Life to Live would later share a series finale date, as One Life to Live concluded a 43-year ABC network run on January 13, 2012, 23 years to the day that Ryan's Hope aired its final episode. (OLTL resumed production in early 2013, initially as an online series airing on Hulu and The Online Network, but also subsequently for TV outlets such as FX Canada and the Oprah Winfrey Network. One Life to Live was later shelved due to a lawsuit between ABC and the production company responsible for the online revival, Prospect Park.)

In October 2013, Ilene Kristen made several appearances on General Hospital, reviving her role as Delia, now much older and running Ryan's Bar (it was largely implied that both Johnny and Maeve had died). Delia was also revealed to be the long-lost mother of Ava Jerome, a General Hospital character. Kristen's appearances were well received, as was the re-designed Ryan's Bar (rumored to be an old set from All My Children). She has repeated her role occasionally in 2014 and 2015 when General Hospital plots take the characters to New York City.

== Broadcast history ==
When Ryan's Hope premiered on July 7, 1975, ABC scheduled it at 1:00 p.m. Eastern/12 Noon Central, a timeslot previously occupied by All My Children (pushing that soap ahead to the 12:30 p.m./11:30 a.m. slot). The network reasoned that Ryan's Hope stood its best chances of gaining an audience by programming it in the 1:00/Noon slot that was free of soap competition on the other networks and by having ABC's number-one soap as a lead-in. The show's audience grew from a 5.7 rating in 1975 (a rating is "the percentage of TV homes in the US that is tuned in") to a 7.3 in 1976. This placed Ryan's Hope in second place on the ABC roster, with All My Children at an 8.2 rating, ahead of General Hospital at a 7.1 rating and One Life to Live at a 6.8 rating. RH replaced the game show Split Second, which ended one week before the serial's premiere, following a week of special hour-long episodes of All My Children, from June 30 to July 4 at 12:30 p.m. (11:30 Central).

In 1976, ABC joined the other networks in planning to expand its soaps to an hour-long format. Labine and Mayer declined to expand Ryan's Hope, which was moved to 12:30 p.m. Eastern/11:30 a.m Central in January 1977, in order to allow All My Children to shift to hour-long episodes on a permanent basis, after the 1975 trial run mentioned above. The time change put it in competition with another soap for the first time, CBS' durable Search for Tomorrow. The ratings slipped a bit (7.0 in the 1977–78 season) against a 7.5 rating for Search for Tomorrow; ultimately, Ryan's Hope never exceeded its peak 1976 achievement. By 1978, all the other ABC-developed soaps had stronger ratings than RH. In 1979, All My Children was the number one daytime soap on TV, with a 9.0 rating, supplanted in 1980 by General Hospital with a 9.9 rating. While ABC otherwise flourished, Ryan's Hope struggled with its recasting and surreal storylines, and saw its ratings again at 7.0.

In June 1980, daytime television's most-popular game show at the time, Family Feud (original Richard Dawson version), moved into the lead-in 12 noon/11 Central position, but Ryan's Hope retained little if any of that audience.

In 1981, CBS moved its ascendant The Young and the Restless to the same slot Ryan's Hope occupied, 12:30 Eastern/11:30 Central. The CBS soap garnered a 7.4 rating to a 6.9 for Ryan's Hope. By the following year, CBS earned an 8.0 for the timeslot while Ryan's Hope slid to a 5.6. ABC fared better against the second half of The Young and the Restless, as All My Children had ratings of 9.4 for 1982–83. The ratings continued to decline for Ryan's Hope, and ABC realized it could not perform apace its other soaps. Ryan's Hope was moved to 12 noon Eastern/11:00 a.m. Central on October 8, 1984, under the belief that if it had built an audience before in a soap-free timeslot, in its first 18 months, perhaps it could do so again (in the Eastern Time Zone, at least).

However, the ratings for Ryan's Hope never stopped eroding; for one thing, CBS affiliates in the Central Time Zone usually ran Y&R at 11 a.m. local time, with its first half hour against RH. ABC continued to air the show for another four years, even though after 1984 it never had a rating higher than 3.4, about a third of what the top-rated soaps were earning. Another exacerbating factor was that although the noon timeslot relieved Ryan's Hope of soap competition in Eastern Time Zone markets, many ABC affiliates there were intent on airing local newscasts or other syndicated programming in that slot; they did not run Ryan's Hope, often relegating it to independent stations within their markets, which further diminished the number of households tuned in, due to those stations' typically lower public profile. In markets where the show did air at its normal time, it also went up against the aforementioned Super Password (which was also not aired by NBC affiliates in some areas). ABC finally canceled the show in October 1988, with the final episode airing on Friday, January 13, 1989; it was temporarily replaced by reruns of Growing Pains and later Perfect Strangers, and the 1990–91 season saw the arrival of ABC's last daytime game show to date, a revival of Match Game, but like Ryan's Hope, it also suffered from the noon timeslot. When that show ended its run on July 12, 1991, The Home Show expanded to 90 minutes until ABC returned the noon timeslot to its affiliates in September 1992. Loving was then fed to affiliates at 12 noon/11 a.m. CT/PT or 12:30/11:30 CT/PT, giving affiliates in the Central and Pacific time zones the option to air local news at 11:30 a.m.

Given the fact that the show, despite having a loyal, devoted (some would say a cult) following, never performed up to ABC's expectations, Ryan's Hope's run of 13 1/2 years was lengthy for its time, especially before the proliferation of options on cable television that would eventually erode the audience for all daytime serials beginning in the 1990s and continuing to this day.

== List of cast members ==
Actor	Character	Duration
Jason Adams	John Reid Ryan	1986–89
Nancy Addison	Jillian Coleridge	1975–89
Ana Alicia	Alicia Nieves	1977–78
Betty Alley	Betty Sherman	1985–86
Julia Barr	Serena "Reenie" Szabo	1976
Bernard Barrow	Johnny Ryan	1975–89
Barbara Blackburn	Siobhan Ryan	1988–89
John Blazo	Patrick Ryan	1978–79
Yasmine Bleeth	Ryan Fenelli	1985–89
Mary Carney	Mary Ryan Fenelli	1978
Faith Catlin	Faith Coleridge	1975–76
Judith Chapman	Charlotte Greer	1983
Dominic Chianese	Alexei Vartova	1981
Patrick James Clarke	Patrick Ryan	1982–83
Michael Corbett	Michael Pavel, Jr.	1979–81
Justin Deas	Bucky Carter	1975–78
Yvette Deas	Mary Ryan Fenelli	1977
Randall Edwards	Delia Ryan	1979–82
Michael Fairman	Nick Szabo	1975–76, 1977
Robert Finoccoli	Patrick Ryan	1979
John Gabriel	Seneca Beaulac	1975–85, 1988–89
Helen Gallagher	Maeve Ryan	1975–89
Nicolette Goulet	Mary Ryan Fenelli	1979
Malcolm Groome	Patrick Ryan	1975–78, 1983–89
Ron Hale	Roger Coleridge	1975–89
Michael Hawkins	Frank Ryan	1975–76
Marg Helgenberger	Siobhan Ryan	1982–86
Catherine Hicks	Faith Coleridge	1976–78
Earl Hindman	Bob Reid	1975–84, 1988–89
Scott Holmes	Dave Greenberg	1984–85
Mary Page Keller	Amanda Kirkland	1982–83
Daniel Hugh Kelly	Frank Ryan	1978–81
Ilene Kristen	Delia Ryan	1975–79, 1982–83, 1986–89
Michael Levin	Jack Fenelli	1975–89
Peter Love	Mark D'Angelo	1986–88
Kelli Maroney	Kimberly Harris	1979–82
Robin Mattson	Delia Ryan	1984
Molly McGreevy	Polly Longworth	1977–81
Robyn Millan	Delia Ryan	1979
Karen Morris-Gowdy	Faith Coleridge	1978–84, 1989
Kate Mulgrew	Mary Ryan Fenelli	1975–78, 1983, 1986, 1989
Carrell Myers	Siobhan Ryan	1986–87
Michael Palance	Robert Rowan	1988–89
Will Patton	Ox Knowles	1982–83
Geoff Pierson	Frank Ryan	1983–85
Daniel Pilon	Max Dubujak	1983–88
Nancy Reardon	Kathleen Ryan Thompson	1976–80
Andrew Robinson	Frank Ryan	1976–78
John Sanderford	Frank Ryan	1985–89
David Sederholm	Detective Bill Hyde	1983–85
Louise Shaffer	Rae Woodard	1977–84, 1989
Grant Show	Rick Hyde	1984–87
Christian Slater	D.J. LaSalle	1985
Jadrien Steele	John "Little John" Ryan	1975–85
Gordon Thomson	Aristotle Benedict White	1981–82
Cali Timmins	Maggie Shelby	1983–89
Kathleen Tolan	Mary Ryan Fenelli	1978–79
Diana Van der Vlis	Nell Beaulac	1975–76
Diana Van der Vlis	Sherry Rowan	1987–89
Gretchen Van Ryper	Denise Idoni	1981

== Awards and nominations ==
=== Daytime Emmy Award wins ===
Category	Recipient	Role	Year(s)
Outstanding Drama Series			1977, 1979
Lead Actress	Helen Gallagher	Maeve Ryan	1976, 1977, 1988
Supporting Actress	Louise Shaffer	Rae Woodard	1983
Outstanding Writing for a Drama Series			1977, 1978, 1979, 1980, 1983, 1984

==== Other categories ====
- 1987 "Outstanding Achievement in Lighting Direction for a Drama Series"
- 1981 "Outstanding Design Achievement for a Drama Series"
- 1980 "Outstanding Direction for a Drama Series"
- 1979 "Outstanding Direction for a Drama Series"
- 1977 "Outstanding Individual Director for a Drama Series" (Lela Swift)

=== Other awards ===
- Writers Guild of America Award (1976, 1977, 1978, 1979, 1981, 1982, 1983, 1984, 1987, 1988, 1989, 1990)

== Crew ==
Years	Head writer(s)
July 7, 1975 – March 12, 1982	Claire Labine; Paul Avila Mayer
March 15, 1982 - July 30, 1982	Claire Labine
August 2, 1982 – January 7, 1983	Mary Ryan Munisteri
January 10, 1983 – November 18, 1983	Claire Labine; Paul Avila Mayer
November 21, 1983 – February 15, 1985	Pat Falken Smith
February 18, 1985 – January 30, 1987	Tom King; Millee Taggart
February 2, 1987 – March 18, 1988	Claire Labine; Eleanor Labine
March 21, 1988 – September 2, 1988	Claire Labine; Matthew Labine
September 5, 1988 – January 13, 1989	Claire Labine; Matthew Labine; Eleanor Labine

Years	Executive Producers
July 7, 1975– July 23, 1982	Claire Labine; Paul Avila Mayer
July 26, 1982 – April 1, 1983	Ellen Barrett
April 4, 1983 – June 17, 1988	Joseph Hardy
June 20, 1988 – January 13, 1989	Felicia Minei Behr

Years	Producers
July 7- September 22, 1975	George Lefferts
September 23, 1975– August 30, 1978	Robert Costello
August 31, 1978– July 23, 1982	Ellen Barrett
July 26, 1982 – April 1, 1983	None
April 4, 1983 – June 17, 1988	Felicia Minei Behr
June 20, 1988 – January 13, 1989	Nancy Horwich

Years	Associate Producers
July 7, 1975 – June 14, 1976	Monroe E. Carol
June 15, 1976 – August 30, 1978	Ellen Barrett
August 31, 1978 – July 23, 1982, April 4, 1983 – June 17, 1988	Nancy Horwich
July 26, 1982 – April 1, 1983	Nancy Horwich; Felicia Minei Behr
June 20, 1988 – January 13, 1989	Jean Dadario Burke
