= Helen Gallagher =

American actress and singer (1926–2024)

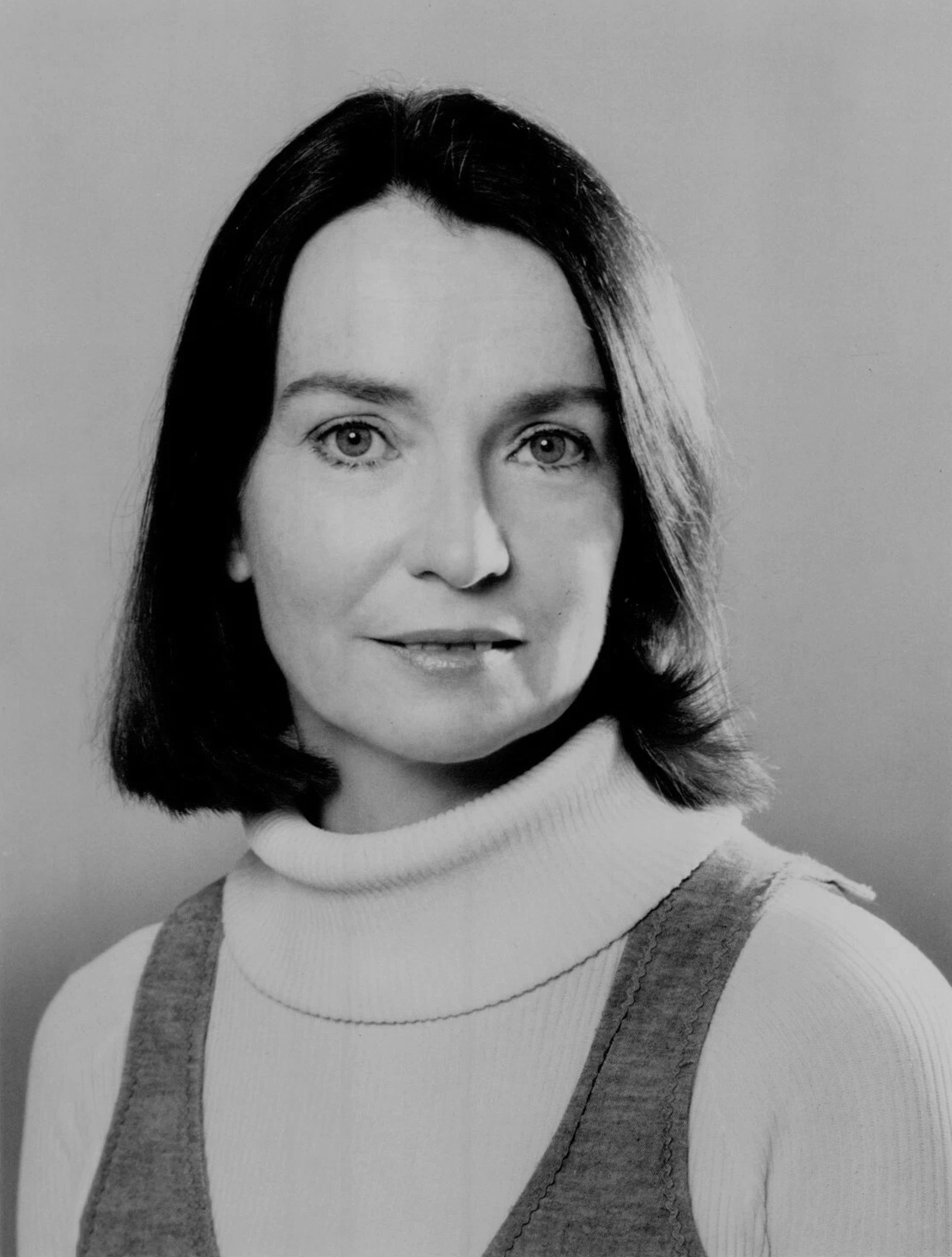
- Gallagher in 1977
- Born: July 19, 1926; New York City, U.S.
- Died: November 24, 2024 (aged 98); New York City, U.S.
- Occupations: Actress; dancer; singer
- Years active: 1944–2024
- Spouse: Frank Wise (m. 1956; div. 1972)
- Awards: Full list

Helen Gallagher (July 19, 1926 – November 24, 2024) was an American actress, dancer, and singer. She received three Daytime Emmy Awards, two Tony Awards, a Donaldson Award, and a Drama Desk Award.

Gallagher's work on the New York stages spanned seven decades, with her big break coming in the role of Nancy in the 1947 musical High Button Shoes. Gallagher won her first Tony Award and a Donaldson Award for her role as Gladys Bumps in the 1952 revival of Pal Joey, and earned her first leading role on the Broadway stage in 1953, starring in Hazel Flagg. Two more noteworthy stage roles for Gallagher included her run as Nickie in Sweet Charity, which began in January 1966, and earned Gallagher a Tony Award nomination; and then, a year and a half later, Gallagher replaced Gwen Verdon in the lead role of Charity. Gallagher won her second Tony Award as well as a Drama Desk Award for her role as Lucille Early in the 1971 revival of the 1920s musical classic No, No, Nanette.

Gallagher also portrayed Irish matriarch Maeve Ryan on the ABC soap opera Ryan's Hope. She played Maeve for the show's duration, from July 1975 to January 1989, and was recognized with three Daytime Emmy Awards. Gallagher last acted on the New York stages in 2000 and worked as an acting instructor at Herbert Berghof Studio in New York City.

== Life and career ==
=== Early life ===
Born in Brooklyn, New York, on July 19, 1926, Gallagher was raised in Scarsdale, New York, and the Bronx. Her parents separated and she was raised by an aunt. She became sick with asthma when she was 14 years old and remained sick for two years. She began taking dancing lessons when she was 9.

=== Stage ===
Gallagher was known for decades as a Broadway performer. She appeared in Make a Wish, Hazel Flagg, Portofino, High Button Shoes, and Sweet Charity (for which she received a 1967 Tony Award nomination for Featured Actress in a Musical), eventually assuming the title role, and closing the original Broadway run. She also appeared in Cry for Us All.

Gallagher's Broadway debut came in Seven Lively Arts (1944) as a member of the corps de ballet and an understudy. She was a teenager when her jitterbugging ability led Billy Rose to sign her for the show. In 1952, she won a Tony Award and a Donaldson Award for her work in the revival of Pal Joey. In 1971, she won her second Tony for her role in the revival of the musical No, No, Nanette. Her song-and-dance number with Bobby Van from that show, "You Can Dance with Any Girl", was a popular number from the 1971 revival, and was performed by both Gallagher and Van on the 1971 and 1972 Tony Awards telecasts. She later took on the role of Sue Smith in the Paper Mill Playhouse revival of the show, playing the role Keeler played a quarter century earlier.

Her first starring role on Broadway came in 1953 as title character in Hazel Flagg, based on the 1937 Carole Lombard movie Nothing Sacred. The role earned her a feature-photo shoot for Life. Gallagher appeared in the 1977 movie Roseland opposite Christopher Walken. An aficionada of Rodgers and Hammerstein, she appeared on a special tribute to Richard Rodgers on The Bell Telephone Hour.

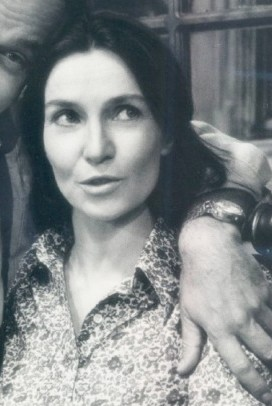
Gallagher in Ryan's Hope (1977)

=== Television ===
In 1949 Gallagher was co-host of Manhattan Showcase, a 15-minute talent-discovery program on CBS television.

Despite extensive work on Broadway, Gallagher is perhaps best known to many Americans unfamiliar with her theater repertoire as the Irish matriarch Maeve Ryan on the ABC soap opera Ryan's Hope, a role she played for the show's entire duration, from 1975 to 1989. She was nominated for five Daytime Emmy Awards for her work on the serial, winning in 1976, 1977, and 1988.

At the time she was cast in Ryan's Hope, Gallagher taught singing in her home three times a week. Michael Hawkins, who played the first Frank Ryan, was one of her students.

As the show progressed into the 1980s, the show's ratings — never at blockbuster levels — took a steep slide. ABC executives cancelled Ryan's Hope in 1989. Creator and head writer Claire Labine scripted the end of the final episode with Maeve at the family bar, singing "Danny Boy". Almost immediately after the cancellation of Ryan's Hope, Gallagher had a two-day guest stint on Another World, and appeared in All My Children as a strict nurse and on One Life to Live as a sex therapist. She also continued to act in various off-Broadway and professional theater productions.

=== Personal life ===
On October 14, 1956, in New York City, Gallagher married Frank Wise, who she met when he was a stagehand for The Pajama Game. They divorced in 1972. Her friend Patti Specht served as the executor of her will at the time of her death.

=== Later life and death ===
In 1984, Gallagher starred in the title role of Tallulah, a musical stage biography of actress Tallulah Bankhead. In 1990s, she guest-starred on Law & Order and The Cosby Mysteries. In 1997, she starred in the independent LGBT-themed drama film Neptune’s Rocking Horse.

She was a faculty member at Herbert Berghof Studio in New York City.

Gallagher died in New York City on November 24, 2024, at the age of 98.

An official website chronicling her life and career launched on her birth centenary on July 19, 2026.

== Theater credits ==
Theater
Opening date	Closing date	Title	Role	Theatre
December 7, 1944	May 12, 1945	Seven Lively Arts	Understudy; Corps de Ballet	Ziegfeld
September 6, 1945	September 15, 1945	Mr. Strauss Goes to Boston	Corps de Ballet	New Century
December 21, 1945	June 29, 1946	Billion Dollar Baby	Chorine; Dancer; Neighbor	Alvin
March 13, 1947	July 31, 1948	Brigadoon	Dancer	Ziegfeld
October 9, 1947	July 2, 1949	High Button Shoes	Nancy	New Century; Shubert; Broadway
October 13, 1949	March 18, 1950	Touch and Go	Daughter; Neighbor; The Girl; Theatregoer	Broadhurst; Broadway
April 18, 1951	July 14, 1951	Make a Wish	Poupette	Winter Garden
January 3, 1952	April 18, 1953	Pal Joey	Gladys Bumps	Broadhurst
February 11, 1953	September 19, 1953	Hazel Flagg	Hazel Flagg	Mark Hellinger
May 13, 1954	November 24, 1956	The Pajama Game	Gladys (replacement)	St. James; Shubert Theatre
April 20, 1955	May 31, 1955	Guys and Dolls	Miss Adelaide	City Center
May 18, 1955	May 29, 1955	Finian's Rainbow	Sharon McLonergan	City Center
April 9, 1957	May 5, 1957	Brigadoon	Meg Brockie	Adelphi
February 21, 1958	February 22, 1958	Portofino	Kitty	Adelphi
Mar 19, 1958	March 30, 1958	Oklahoma!	Ado Annie Carnes	City Center
December 31, 1964	January 23, 1965	Royal Flush	Understudy	Shubert
January 29, 1966	July 15, 1967	Sweet Charity	Nickie understudy Charity replacement Charity	Palace
May 24, 1966	January 3, 1970	Mame	replacement Agnes Gooch	Winter Garden; Broadway
April 8, 1970	April 15, 1970	Cry for Us All	Bessie Legg	Broadhurst
January 19, 1971	February 3, 1973	No, No, Nanette	Lucille Early	46th Street
November 11, 1972	February 11, 1973	Much Ado About Nothing	Choreography assistant to Donald Saddler	Winter Garden
April 26, 1976	May 9, 1976	Tickles by Tucholsky		Theatre Four
October 5, 1977	November 27, 1977	The Misanthrope	Arsinoe	Joseph Papp Public Theater; New York Shakespeare Festival
June 14, 1978	December 3, 1978	The American Dance Machine	Choreographic reconstruction	Century
October 10, 1978	November 12, 1978	A Broadway Musical	Maggie Simpson	Theatre of the Riverside Church
October 8, 1979	August 28, 1982	Sugar Babies	Replacement	Mark Hellinger
May 14, 1981	October 25, 1981	I Can't Keep Running in Place	Beth	Westside
June 13, 1983	Unknown	Tallulah	Tallulah Bankhead	Westside Arts
August 23, 1983	September 5, 1983	Same Time, Next Year	Doris	Ivoryton Playhouse
March 9, 1987	March 9, 1987	Star Dust	Performer	Sardi's
May 17, 1990	July 8, 1990	Annie 2	Fran Riley	Norma Terris
September 6, 1990	September 9, 1990	Money Talks		Promenade
June 1996	June 1996	Home	Mother	Ensemble Studio Theatre
April 9, 1997	May 27, 1997	No, No, Nanette		Paper Mill Playhouse
January 28, 2000	January 30, 2000	70, Girls, 70	Gert	York Theatre Company

== Film and television ==
Film and television
Year	Title	Role	Notes
1949	Manhattan Showcase	Host	
1951	Don Ameche's Musical Playhouse	Self	Jan 25, 1951
1951	Don Ameche's Musical Playhouse	Self	Feb 4, 1951
1951	Paul Whitman's Goodyear Revue	Self	May 20, 1951
1951	General Electric Guest House	Self	August 12, 1951
1951	The Mel Torme Show	Self	November 5, 1951
1951	Colgate Comedy Hour	Self	Episodes 1.35 and 1.40
1952	The Ezio Pinza Show		February 1, 1952
1953	The Ed Sullivan Show	Self	Episodes 6.25 and 6.45
1954	Kraft Television Theatre		TV series, episode: Pardon My Prisoner
1955	Colgate Comedy Hour	Self	Episode 5.33
1955	A.N.T.A. Album of 1955	Self	
1958	The Ed Sullivan Show	Self	Episodes 11.17, 11.19 and 11.32
1960	Strangers When We Meet	Betty Anders	
1960	Hallmark Hall of Fame	Lise	TV series, episode: Shangri-La
1961	The Bell Telephone Hour	Self	TV series, episode: The Music of Richard Rodgers
1961	Yves Montand on Broadway	Self	
1971	The David Frost Show	Self	Episode 3.109
1971	The Tonight Show Starring Johnny Carson	Self	Feb 4, 1971
1972	26th Tony Awards	Self	
1973	27th Tony Awards	Self	
1976	The American Woman: Portraits of Courage	Mary Harris Jones	
1977	Roseland	Cleo	
1975–1989	Ryan's Hope	Maeve Ryan	TV series, 789 episodes
1982	Family Feud	Self	Feb 8, 1982
1989	Live with Regis	Self	Jan 13, 1989
1989	Entertainment Tonight	Self	Jan 13, 1989
1989	Another World	Hannah Tuttle	TV series, 2 episodes
1993	Law & Order	Flo Bishop	TV series, episode: Born Bad
1995	The Cosby Mysteries		TV series, episode: Last Tango
1995	All My Children	Nurse Harris	TV series, 2 episodes
1997	Neptune's Rocking Horse	Sadie	
1997–1998	One Life to Live	Dr. Maud Boylan	TV series, 6 episodes
2009	American Masters	Self	TV series, episode: Jerome Robbins: Something to Dance About

== Awards and nominations ==
Award	Year (Note: Indicates the year of ceremony.)	Category	Nominated work	Result	Ref.
Daytime Emmy Awards	1976	Outstanding Lead Actress in a Drama Series	Ryan's Hope	Won	
Daytime Emmy Awards	1977	Outstanding Lead Actress in a Drama Series	Ryan's Hope	Won	
Daytime Emmy Awards	1979	Outstanding Lead Actress in a Drama Series	Ryan's Hope	Nominated	
Daytime Emmy Awards	1981	Outstanding Lead Actress in a Drama Series	Ryan's Hope	Nominated	
Daytime Emmy Awards	1988	Outstanding Lead Actress in a Drama Series	Ryan's Hope	Won	
Donaldson Awards	1952	Best Supporting Actress in a Musical	Pal Joey	Won	
Drama Desk Awards	1971	Outstanding Actress in a Musical	No, No, Nanette	Won	
Tony Awards	1952	Best Featured Actress in a Musical	Pal Joey	Won	
Tony Awards	1966	Best Featured Actress in a Musical	Sweet Charity	Nominated	
Tony Awards	1971	Best Actress in a Musical	No, No, Nanette	Won	
