= Michael Hawkins (American actor) =

American actor (1938–2022)

- Born: Thomas Knight Slater; December 26, 1938; Queens, New York, U.S.
- Died: November 14, 2022 (aged 83); Los Angeles, California, U.S.
- Other name: Michael D. Gainsborough
- Occupation: Actor
- Years active: 1951–1988
- Spouse: Mary Jo Slater (m. 1966; div. 1976)
- Children: Christian Slater
- Relatives: Bill Slater (uncle)

Thomas Knight Slater (December 26, 1938 – November 14, 2022), known professionally as Michael Hawkins and credited sometimes as Michael D. Gainsborough, was an American actor. He is known for playing Frank Ryan on the soap opera Ryan's Hope (1975–1986). He was the father of actor Christian Slater.

== Life and career ==
Thomas Knight Slater was born in Queens, New York on December 26, 1938, the son of Helen Margaret (née Knight; 1913–1999) and Thomas G. Slater (1907–1961). He would later also use the stage name Michael Gainsborough. His uncle was radio personality Bill Slater.

Hawkins spent the early part of his childhood in Forest Hills section of Queens, as well as in Texas and Tennessee. Later in the 1940s, he lived in the Strathmore section of Manhasset, Long Island. He was athletic and was one of the faster boys at his grade school, Munsey Park School, and started his acting and singing career in a fourth-grade production of the Gilbert Sullivan operetta, HMS Pinafore, as Captain Corcoran. His family left Manhasset in 1950. It is not clear where he was raised after that point. After a small role on the CBS soap opera Search for Tomorrow, he played Dr. Paul Stewart #4 on another CBS soap opera, As the World Turns. He later replaced David Birney as Mark Elliott on another CBS show, Love is a Many Splendored Thing. He later played Larry Kirby #2 on the NBC soap opera How to Survive a Marriage.

Hawkins later created the role of Frank Ryan on the ABC soap opera Ryan's Hope but was fired from the role at the end of the show's first year reportedly due to his alcoholism and inability to memorize lines correctly. He was asked back, but replaced with actor Andrew Robinson later that year. At the time she was cast in Ryan's Hope, Helen Gallagher, who played matriarch Maeve Ryan, taught singing in her home three times a week. Hawkins was one of her students.

Hawkins was married to casting director Mary Jo Slater until their divorce in 1976; their only child is actor Christian Slater.

Hawkins died in Los Angeles on November 14, 2022, at the age of 83.

== Filmography ==
Film and television roles
Year	Title	Role	Notes
1967	Search for Tomorrow	Steve Haskins	TV series
1968	As the World Turns	Dr. Paul Stewart	TV series
1970–1971	Love is a Many Splendored Thing	Mark Elliott	TV series
1974	The Doctors	Officer Burnett	TV series (4 episodes)
1975–1986	Ryan's Hope	Frank Ryan	TV series (213 episodes)
1975	Trucker's Woman	Mike Kelly	
1975	How to Survive a Marriage	Larry Kirby	TV series (Episode #1.325)
1979	The Amityville Horror	New York State Trooper	
1980	The Black Marble	Captain Jack Packerton	Credited as Michael Gainsborough
1981	Mommie Dearest	Pepsi Executive #2	Credited as Michael D. Gainsborough
1981	Looker	Senator Robert Harrison	Credited as Michael Gainsborough
1987	Crime Story	Danforth	TV series (Episode: "Mig 21"); credited as Michael D. Gainsborough
1988	Midnight Run	FBI Surveillance Agent #1	Final film role; credited as Michael D. Gainsborough
