= Bernard Barrow =

American actor (1927–1993)

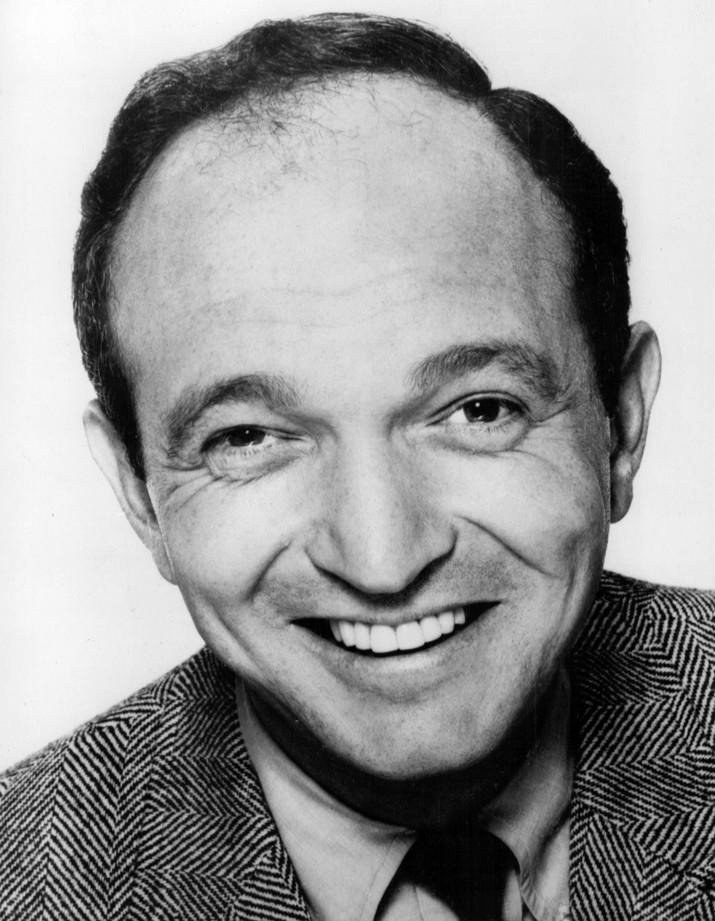
- Barrow in 1972.
- Born: Bernard Elliott Barrow; December 30, 1927; New York, New York, U.S.
- Died: August 4, 1993 (aged 65); New York, New York, U.S.
- Other name: Bernie Barrow
- Occupations: Actor, collegiate drama professor
- Years active: 1961–1993
- Spouse: Joan Kaye (m. 1964)

Bernard Elliott "Bernie" Barrow (December 30, 1927 – August 4, 1993) was an American actor and collegiate drama professor. He was best known as an actor for his roles as Johnny Ryan, an Irish-American patriarch, on Ryan's Hope (1975 to 1989) and Louie Slavinsky, a kindhearted garbage collector, on Loving (1989 to 1993). He won a Daytime Emmy Award for Outstanding Supporting Actor in 1991 for his role on Loving.

== Early life ==
Barrow was born to Russian Jewish immigrants in New York City and raised in Yorkville, a neighborhood on the Upper East Side of Manhattan. His father ran a laundry and his mother also worked there. Barrow had two sisters. He received a bachelor's degree from Syracuse University in 1947, a master's degree from Columbia University in 1948, and a doctorate from Yale Drama School in 1957.

Paul Newman was one of Barrow's classmates at Yale and they appeared together in a student production of Pirandello's Tonight We Improvise. Barrow had the lead role, while Newman played a cadet. Later, when Newman needed an audition scene for the Actors Studio, he used Barrow's big scene from the play.

== Career ==
By the age of twenty-two, Barrow was one of the youngest professors at Brooklyn College. He taught drama and theater there for thirty years, while also directing summer stock and community theater. One of Barrow's students was Dominic Chianese, who later starred on The Sopranos. He also taught Jimmy Smits and director Joel Zwick.

Barrow appeared Off-Broadway as Jonah Goodman in The Gentle People, a play by Irwin Shaw, in 1946. He was only nineteen at the time and the character was in his fifties. In 1947, he was cast in The Fall of the House of Usher, a production that aired on Philco TV. Barrow starred as Mitch in A Streetcar Named Desire at Miami's Coconut Grove Playhouse in 1953. He appeared in Stalag 17 at New York's Studio Arena Theater in the summer of 1954. In 1955, at the age of twenty-eight, he once again played a much older man in a production of Gentlemen Prefer Blondes.

Barrow appeared in numerous other Off-Broadway plays, including Molly's Dream and Scuba Duba. In the 1960s, he began to land roles in television and film. He played a reporter in a February 1968 episode of The Doctors. That same year, he played Joanne Woodward's principal in Rachel, Rachel, directed by his former classmate, Paul Newman.

He was cast as Earl Dana on the CBS soap opera Where the Heart Is, playing the role from 1969 to 1970. This was followed by another CBS soap opera, The Secret Storm, where Barrow played Dan Kincaid from 1970 to 1974. He co-starred with Jennifer O'Neill in the film Glass Houses and with Al Pacino in Serpico. He also appeared in the film Claudine.

On television, Barrow played the Judge who married Rhoda Morgenstern and Joe Gerard on Rhoda, as well as the Judge who married Maude and Walter Findlay on Maude. He also made guest appearances on Kojak, The Waltons, and On Our Own. Barrow and his wife, Joan Kaye, guest starred together on an episode of The Rookies, playing a married couple.

Barrow played Ira Paulson on the CBS soap opera The Edge of Night, from 1974 to 1975. He then fought to play the role of Johnny Ryan on the ABC soap opera Ryan's Hope, after being told by the casting director that he was "Too Jewish to play an Irishman." Barrow was initially asked to audition for the role of Seneca Beaulac (which went to John Gabriel). He was eventually cast as Johnny Ryan, playing him from 1975 until the show's final episodes in 1989.

In the 1980s, Barrow appeared in the films Jane Austen in Manhattan, The Survivors, Invasion U.S.A., and the TV movie Senior Trip. He guest starred on Kate & Allie in 1988 and Law & Order in 1990.

After his 13-year run with Ryan's Hope, he was cast as Louie Slavinsky on the ABC soap opera Loving in December 1989. He won the role without an audition because of his prior history with the network at RH. Barrow won a Daytime Emmy Award for Outstanding Supporting Actor in 1991 for his role on Loving, after receiving nominations for RH in 1979 and 1988. He was nominated again in the same category in 1992.

In 1992, he starred in a stage production of Barefoot in the Park at the Valley Forge and Westbury Music Fair. He co-starred with fellow soap opera actors Marilyn Chris, Cady McClain, and Walt Willey.

== Personal life ==
Barrow began to lose his hair in his late twenties and was going bald by his early thirties. He started wearing a toupée while acting in television commercials in the 1970s and continued to wear it for many roles, including on Ryan's Hope.

He met actress Joan Kaye in 1963 while starring in a stage revival of Guys and Dolls. They married on September 15, 1964 and remained together until his death. He had two children from a previous marriage and two stepchildren.

== Death ==
Barrow continued to work on Loving even after his diagnosis with lung cancer. He died from the disease at Lenox Hill Hospital in Manhattan, at the age of 65.

== Filmography ==
=== Film ===
Year	Title	Role	Notes
1968	Rachel, Rachel	Leighton Siddley	
1972	Glass Houses	Victor	
1973	Serpico	Inspector Roy Palmer	
1974	Claudine	Mr. Winograd	
1980	Jane Austen in Manhattan	Mr. Polson	
1983	The Survivors	TV station manager	
1985	Invasion U.S.A.	Supermarket Manager	
1987	Sweet Lorraine	Mr. Rosenfeld	

=== Television ===
Year	Title	Role	Notes
1961;1963	Car 54, Where Are You?	Policeman; Officer in Station	2 episodes
1966	Hawk	Mr. Baretta	Episode: "Blind Man's Bluff"
1968	The Doctors	Reporter	2 episodes
1968	Get Smart	Stanislaus	Episode: "The Worst Best Man"
1968	N.Y.P.D.	Dr. Leslie	Episode: "Case of the Shady Lady"
1969-1970	Where the Heart Is	Earl Dana	Contract role
1970-1974	The Secret Storm	Dan Kincaid	Contract role
1974	Kojak	Paul Paulus	Episode: "Wall Street Gunslinger"
1974	Rhoda	Judge	Episode: "Rhoda's Wedding"
1974	The Waltons	Harry Bracket	Episode: "The Marathon"
1974	The Rookies	Reverend Scott	Episode: "Prelude to Vengeance"
1966;1974-1975	The Edge of Night	Guard;Ira Paulson	Day player; Contract role
1975-1989	Ryan's Hope	Johnny Ryan	Contract role 1,949 episodes
1978	Barnaby Jones	Gordon Lassiter	Episode: "The Scapegoat"
1978	On Our Own	The Judge	Episode: "Meet Mr. Meat"
1978	The Eddie Capra Mysteries	Dr. George Turnbull	Episode: "Where There's Smoke"
1979	Women at West Point	Commandant	Television film
1981	Senior Trip	Nathan Aldrich	Television film
1988	Kate & Allie		Episode: "A Catered Affair"
1989-1993	Loving	Louie Slavinsky	Contract role
1990	Law & Order	David Hamilton	Episode: "By Hooker, by Crook"
1991;1992	All My Children	Louie Slavinsky	2 episodes

== Awards and nominations ==
Year	Award	Category	Nominee(s)	Result	Ref.
1979	Daytime Emmy Award	Outstanding Supporting Actor in a Drama Series	Ryan's Hope	Nominated	
1988	Daytime Emmy Award	Outstanding Supporting Actor in a Drama Series	Ryan's Hope	Nominated	
1991	Daytime Emmy Award	Outstanding Supporting Actor in a Drama Series	Loving	Won	
1992	Daytime Emmy Award	Outstanding Supporting Actor in a Drama Series	Loving	Nominated	
