= Roscoe Born =

American actor and songwriter (1950–2020)

- Born: Roscoe Conklin Born; November 24, 1950; Topeka, Kansas, U.S.
- Died: March 3, 2020 (aged 69)
- Occupations: Actor, songwriter
- Years active: 1976–2020
- Spouses: Randall Edwards (m. 1985; div. 1990) Roberta Weiss (m. 1994; div. 1997)
- Children: 1

Roscoe Conklin Born (November 24, 1950 – March 3, 2020) was an American actor and songwriter. He is best known for his roles on various television soap operas, most notably as archvillain Mitch Laurence on One Life to Live in six stints between 1985 and 2012.

== Early life and education ==
Born was born in Topeka, Kansas. Roscoe went to Albert Einstein High School in Kensington, Maryland then attended both Tulane University and Boston University.

== Career ==
Born appeared most often in daytime television, first appearing on Ryan's Hope as troubled mob heir Joe Novak from 1981 to 1983 and again in 1988.

From 1985 to 1987, he portrayed villain Mitch Laurence on One Life to Live then again from 2002 to 2003, reprising the role once again starting in November 2009.

Born appeared on Santa Barbara in his best known roles Robert Barr (1989–1991) and his twin Quinn Armitage (1990–1991), playing opposite Carrington Garland as Kelly Capwell. He left for vacation and was written out of the show in an airplane crash in early 1990 with fan pressure leading to the return of his character, and renegotiation of his contract. This role earned him an Emmy nomination.

Born was a regular on the primetime soap Paper Dolls as Mark Bailey in 1984. From April 2005 to January 2006 and again in March 2009, Born was on The Young and the Restless in the critically acclaimed role of the evil Tom Fisher. Many of his daytime roles showcased him in evil roles, with the exception of Nick Rivers on the 1995-1997 ABC series The City. Nick was a grizzled musician, allowing Born the opportunity to perform his own material. He can be seen performing some of his more recent songs on YouTube.com: "Bob Dylan's Pepsi Blues"; "Blue State Mind, Red State Soul"; "Soldier On", a salute to our troops in Iraq and Afghanistan; and "If It Don't Stink, Don't Stir the Pot", a response to the Boy Scouts of America sex abuse scandal. In February 2017, Born released two singles on iTunes via Chowderhead Records, "Let the Road Lead" and "Crazy is as Crazy Does".

In the 1980s, he also guest starred in such prime time shows as Murder, She Wrote and Midnight Caller and starred in the TV movies The Haunting of Sarah Hardy and Lady Mobster. In 1989, he had a featured role in the film Pow Wow Highway. 1970s TV appearances include The Incredible Hulk, The Six Million Dollar Man, two episodes of The Rockford Files and the TV movie Fast Friends.

Around this time, Born played the dastardly Jim Thomasen on All My Children. In late 1997, he abruptly left the role and did not appear on daytime for the next several years (save bit parts on As the World Turns and Guiding Light). Born was working outside of the industry when One Life to Live rehired him from 2002 to 2003 to reprise the role of Mitch. Born portrayed an evil prison warden on Passions in 2007, and played the contract role of Dean Trent Robbins on the NBC soap opera Days of Our Lives from May 29, 2008, to September 26, 2008.

Born studied acting at the Arena Stage workshop and made his professional acting debut for them on November 13, 1969, in the play Edith Stein. In 1979, he won a Drama-Logue Award for the play Life in the Theater.

In 1990, Born earned nominations for a Daytime Emmy and Soap Opera Digest award.

== Personal life and death ==
From 1982 to 1990, Born was married to Ryan's Hope actress Randall Edwards. He was married to fellow Santa Barbara co-star Roberta Weiss from 1994 to 2000, and they had a daughter, Alberta.

Born died on March 3, 2020, at the age of 69. He died by suicide; his family issued a statement that attributed his death to his "long struggle with bipolar disorder".

== Filmography ==
Year	Title	Role	Notes
1976	Joe Forrester	unknown	1 episode
1977	End of the World	Bob	
1977	Jailbait Babysitter	Robert	
1979	Fast Friends	Ben Lakeman	
1979	Dear Detective	unknown	1 episode
1979	The Rockford Files	TV Commentator/Tallafero	2 episodes
1981	Ryan's Hope	Joe Novak	1981–1983; 1988
1981	The Incredible Hulk	Sheldon	1 episodes
1984	Paper Dolls	Mark Bailey	10 episodes
1985	One Life to Live	Mitch Laurence	1985-1987; 2002-2003; 2009-2010; 2012
1988	Lady Mobster	Robert Castle	
1989	Midnight Caller	Sawyer	1 episode
1989	The Haunting of Sarah Hardy	Allen deVineyn	
1989	Powwow Highway	Agent Jack Novall	
1989	Santa Barbara	Robert Barr	1989–1991
1990	Santa Barbara	Quinn Armitage	1990–1991
1990	Murder, She Wrote	Langston 'Lanny' Douglas	1 episode
1993	Family Passions	Kyle McDeere	
1995	The City	Nick Rivers	
1997	All My Children	Jim Thomasen	
2001	As the World Turns	Det. Adamski	1 episode
2001	Guiding Light	Peter Vreeland	1 episode
2001	Days of Our Lives	Trent Robbins; Baron Coe	2001; 2008
2005	The Young and the Restless	Tom Fisher	2005-2006; 2009
2007	Passions	Warden	
2008	Indie Jonesin for the Kingdom of Crystal Ice	Neighbor	
