= Karen Morris-Gowdy =

American actress (born 1956)

- Born: Karen Ann Morris; January 20, 1956 (age 70); Cheyenne, Wyoming, U.S.
- Occupation: Television actress
- Spouse: Curt Gowdy Jr. (m. 1979)
- Children: 3

Karen Morris-Gowdy (born Karen Ann Morris on January 20, 1956, in Cheyenne, Wyoming) is an American actress, best known for her role as the fourth Dr. Faith Coleridge Desmond on Ryan's Hope, a role she played from April 4, 1978 to 1984 and again during the series' final weeks in 1989.

Morris-Gowdy was crowned America's Junior Miss in 1974. She served as emcee of the preliminary finals in 1979 and 1992 and served as a judge in 1980 and 1983. She served on the Board of Directors from 1981 until 1990.

In 1986, she co-starred with D. W. Moffett on The Equalizer as Mary in the episode "No Conscience."

Morris-Gowdy appeared in a Ban Roll-On deodorant television commercial in 1987.

Morris-Gowdy has been married to Curt Gowdy Jr., son of hall of fame sportscaster Curt Gowdy, since 1979. Together they have three children.
