= Robin Mattson =

American actress

- Born: Los Angeles, California
- Occupations: Actress; television personality
- Years active: 1966–2016
- Known for: General Hospital; Santa Barbara; All My Children

Robin Mattson is an American retired actress. She is best known for her roles on the daytime soap operas General Hospital, Santa Barbara, and All My Children.

== Career ==
=== Daytime television ===
Mattson made her daytime debut as troubled teen Hope Bauer on Guiding Light in 1976, her only complete heroine on the soaps. She received a Soap Opera Digest Award and an Emmy Award nomination for her first major role as Heather Webber on General Hospital. During Ilene Kristen's absence from Ryan's Hope, she played Delia Ryan (1984). Replacing Linda Gibboney on Santa Barbara, she received additional Emmy nominations as Gina Blake Lockridge, a role she played from December 1985 through the final episode in January 1993. Mattson then moved to New York to play Janet Green on All My Children (1994–2000). Over the next few years, she took on several short term roles on The Bold and the Beautiful (2003), Madame Cheri Love on As the World Turns (2007), and Lee Michaels on Days of Our Lives (2010–11). Mattson returned to General Hospital on two occasions, first in 2004 for six months, where she was reunited with her former Santa Barbara co-star Jed Allan, and in the spring of 2012. Mattson has continued to play the role for storyline arcs of varying lengths as the plotline dictated. Mattson would exit in early 2015 but returned once again in May 2016.

=== Film and primetime television ===
Mattson began acting at age seven.

She made her screen debut in Namu, the Killer Whale (1966). She co-starred in Bonnie's Kids (1973) when she was only 15, including appearing topless, as well as Candy Stripe Nurses (1974) and Return to Macon County (1975). She appeared in a number of made for television films and guest starred in a number of primetime series, include Marcus Welby, M.D., Happy Days, Barnaby Jones, Charlie's Angels, The Dukes of Hazzard and Law & Order.

== Personal life ==
Mattson, whose father was a chef in California, studied at culinary school and co-authored the cook book Soap Opera Café: The Skinny on Food from a Daytime Star. From June 1996 until March 1997, she had a cooking show on Lifetime, called The Main Ingredient.

== Filmography ==
=== Film ===
Year	Title	Role	Notes
1966	Namu, the Killer Whale	Lisa Rand	
1967	Island of the Lost	Lizzie MacRae	
1973	Bonnie's Kids	Myra	
1974	Candy Stripe Nurses	Dianne	
1974	Phantom of the Paradise	Groupie	
1975	Return to Macon County	Junell	
1980	Wolf Lake	Linda	
1984	In 'n Out	Nancy	
1988	Take Two	Susan Bentley	
1991	In Between	Margo Turner	
2019	The Citizen Hotel	As herself	Documentary film

=== Television ===
Year	Title	Role	Notes
1967	Flipper	Robin James	Episode: "Cap'n Flint"
1967	Gentle Ben	Jenny Maddox	Episode: "Gator Man"
1967	Off to See the Wizard	Lizzie MacRae	Episodes: "Island of the Lost: Part 1" and "Island of the Lost: Part 2"
1970	Daniel Boone	Brae	Episode: "Israel and Love"
1975	Marcus Welby, M.D.	Mavis Brander	Episode: "Dark Corridors"
1975	Happy Days	Linda	Episode: "Three on a Porch"
1975	The Secret Night Caller	Jan Durant	Television film
1976–1977	Guiding Light	Hope Bauer	Series regular
1978	James at 15	Janice Gordon	Episode: "Unrequited Love... Twice"
1978	What Really Happened to the Class of '65?	Linda	Episode: "Class Clown"
1978	The Six Million Dollar Man	Da Nay Jensen	Episode: "The Lost Island"
1978	The Runaways	Melinda	Episode: "Melinda and the Pinball Wizard"
1978	The Incredible Hulk	Irene Shannon	Episode: "Ricky"
1978	Barnaby Jones	Shelly Barrett	Episode: "Hitch-Hike to Terror"
1978	Sword of Justice	Carol	Episode: "Girl on the Edge"
1978	The Hardy Boys/Nancy Drew Mysteries	Sheila	Episode: "Scorpion's Sting"
1978	The Eddie Capra Mysteries	Jill Turnbull	Episode: "Where There's Smoke"
1978	Superdome	Gail Green	Television film
1978	Doctors' Private Lives	Sheila	Television film
1978	Are You in the House Alone?	Allison Bremer	Television film
1979	Captain America	Tina Hayden	Television film
1979	Hot Rod	Jenny	Television film
1979	Mirror, Mirror	Pamela Gorman	Television film
1980	Battles: The Murder That Wouldn't Die	Shelby Battles	Television film
1980	Charlie's Angels	Erica Burke	Episode: "Of Ghosts and Angels"
1980	The Dukes of Hazzard	Diane Benson	Episode: "Carnival of Thrills"
1980–1983, 2004, 2012–2016	General Hospital	Heather Webber	Series regular (1980–83); Soapy Award for Favorite Villainess (1981, 83, 84); Nominated — Daytime Emmy Award for Outstanding Supporting Actress in a Drama Series (1983)
1982	Fantasies	April	Television film
1984	Fantasy Island	Wendy Collins	Episode: "The Awakening of Love/The Impostor"
1984	Ryan's Hope	Delia Ryan	Series regular
1985–1993	Santa Barbara	Gina Capwell	Series regular Soap Opera Digest Award for Outstanding Comic Performance by an Actress: Daytime (1989–90); Nominated — Daytime Emmy Award for Outstanding Supporting Actress in a Drama Series (1987–89); Nominated — Soap Opera Digest Award for Outstanding Comic Performance by an Actress: Daytime (1988)
1989	False Witness	Jody	Television film
1990	Menu for Murder	Jan Mayfield	Television film
1993	Silk Stalkings	Susan Enwright	Episode: "Schemes Like Old Times"
1994–2000	All My Children	Janet Green	Series regular Soap Opera Digest Award for Outstanding Female Scene Stealer (1996)
1994	Green Dolphin Beat	Rose	Television film
2002	Law & Order	Francine Landen	Episode: "American Jihad"
2003	The Bold and the Beautiful	Janet “Sugar” Webber	Recurring role
2007	As the World Turns	Cheri Love	Recurring role
2010–2011	Days of Our Lives	Lee Michaels	Recurring role
