= Randall Edwards (actress) =

American actress

- Born: Atlanta, Georgia, U.S.
- Education: California Institute of the Arts
- Occupation: Actress
- Years active: 1979–1990
- Spouse: Roscoe Born (m. 1982; div. 1990)

Randall Edwards is an American former actress. She is best known for playing the role of Delia Ryan on the television soap opera Ryan's Hope from 1979 to 1982.

== Early life and education ==
Born in Atlanta, Georgia, Edwards' parents divorced when she was 10, and she lived with her mother on Cape Cod.

After graduating from the California Institute of the Arts in 1976, she acted in the theater and later worked as a waitress to buy a van to take her to Hollywood.

== Career ==
Edwards worked as a secretary in Santa Monica, California, and unsuccessfully auditioned for General Hospital before winning the role of Delia Ryan on Ryan's Hope in early 1979. Edwards moved to New York and played the role until 1982. She received a nomination for the Daytime Emmy Award for Outstanding Supporting Actress in a Drama Series for her performance after a storyline where Delia ran over boyfriend Barry Ryan with the car of Faith Coleridge whom she had been driving home after finding her drunk. Her predecessor, Ilene Kristen, was a fan favorite, but Edwards, with her softer, ditsier portrayal, did manage to win over viewers. Edwards also met husband Roscoe Born (Joe Novak) on set; they married in 1985 and divorced in 1990.

She left the cast of Ryan's Hope in 1982 but briefly appeared that same year on As the World Turns as the daughter of Ellen and David Stewart, Dr. Carol Ann "Annie" Stewart #7.

On Broadway, Edwards portrayed a prostitute in the Neil Simon comedy Biloxi Blues and the Kikki in the flop Peter Allen musical Legs Diamond. Edwards later retired from acting and became a psychologist.

== Filmography ==
=== Film ===
Year	Title	Role	Notes
1980	Smokey and the Judge	Waitress	
1984	The Pope of Greenwich Village	Hat Check Girl	

=== Television ===
Year	Title	Role	Notes
1979–1982	Ryan's Hope	Delia Ryan	413 episodes
1982	As the World Turns	Annie Stewart	
1984	Tales of the Unexpected	Rebecca	Episode: "The Gift of Beauty"
1987	Spenser: For Hire	Betsy	Episode: "Mary Hamilton"
1990	Newhart	Libby Harcourt	Episode: "My Husband, My Peasant"
