= Nancy Addison =

American actress (1946-2002)

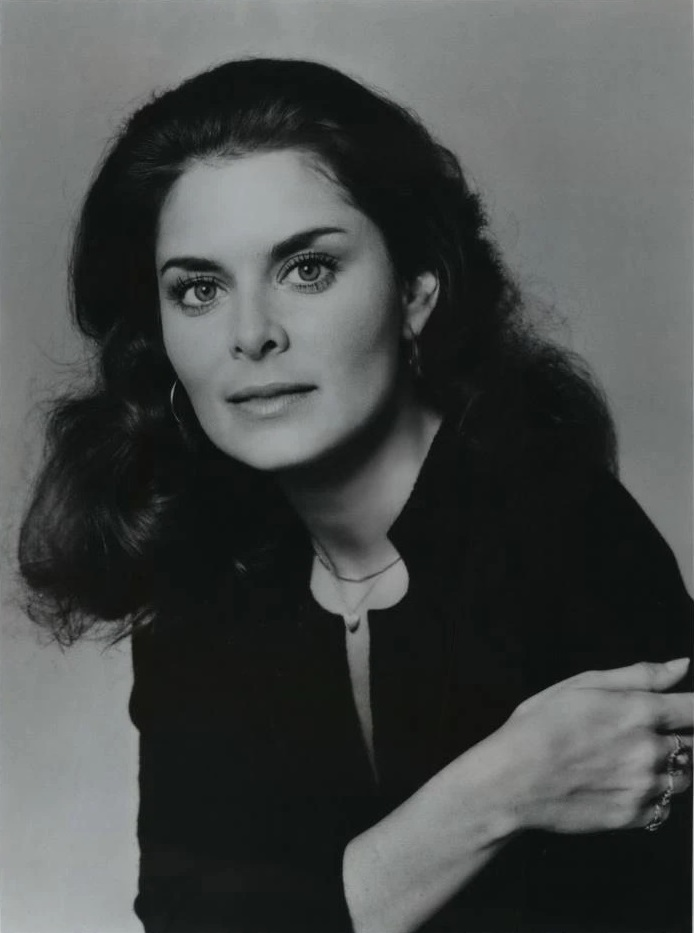
- Addison in 1977
- Born: Nancy Addison Altman; March 21, 1946; New York City, U.S.
- Died: June 18, 2002 (aged 56); New York City, U.S.
- Other name: Nancy Addison-Altman
- Occupation: Actress
- Years active: 1969–1997
- Spouses: Clinton Dunn (before 1975) Daniel Goldfarb (m. 1982)

Nancy Addison Altman (March 21, 1946 – June 18, 2002), also known as Nancy Addison, was an American actress noted for her appearances in soap operas. She first attracted notice for playing Kit Vested on the television soap opera Guiding Light for five years beginning in 1969. She is best known for her role as Jillian Coleridge on the soap opera Ryan's Hope which she played for over twelve years beginning with the show's premiere in 1975. She left the show in early 1988 but returned for its final episodes in 1989.

== Biography ==
Born in New York City, Addison studied with Sanford Meisner at the Neighborhood Playhouse. Her first soap opera role was Kit Vested on Guiding Light, which she played from 1969 to 1974. In 1975, she debuted on Ryan's Hope in the role with which she is most identified, Jillian Coleridge. She played the role for a dozen years until she decided to leave in late 1987, and made her final appearance in January 1988. She returned briefly a year later to reprise the role of Jill for the show's final episodes.

In 1989, she moved into the role of Marissa Rampal on All My Children. Addison portrayed Deborah Brewster Alden from 1993 to 1995 on Loving, and in 1995 played the same role on The City.

She co-starred with James Coburn in the three-part television mini-series The Dain Curse (1978). She also appeared in Somewhere, Tomorrow (1983), Baby Me (1988) and the long-running television series Law & Order in different roles on various episodes.

In the spring of 1978, Addison was selected to serve as the honorary celebrity “Queen of the Azaleas”, during the annual Azalea Festival, held in Wilmington, North Carolina.

== Personal life ==
Twice married, Addison volunteered a great deal of her time working with children with HIV/AIDS.

== Illness and death ==
In 1999, she was diagnosed with cancer of her adrenal gland and bronchial tubes, which claimed her life in 2002 in New York City, aged 56. She was survived by her second husband, Daniel Goldfarb.
