= Alexandra Neil =

American actress (born 1955)

- Born: Dianne Alexandra Swift Thompson; April 7, 1955 (age 70); Boston, Massachusetts, U.S.
- Other names: Dianne Thompson-Neil
- Education: Williams College (BA)
- Occupations: Actress, Playwright, Teacher
- Spouse: John C. Vennema
- Children: 1
- Website: alexandraneil.com

Alexandra Neil (born April 7, 1955) is an American stage, film and television actress. She is also an activist – co-founder of Downtown Women for Change in New York City. Earlier in her career, she was credited as Dianne Thompson-Neil.

== Life and career ==
Neil was born in Boston, Massachusetts. She attended middle school and high school at University-Liggett School in Grosse Pointe, MI. She graduated Cum Laude from Williams College in 1977 with a BA in English/Theatre. She also attended the National Theatre Institute in 1975. She has worked in television, film, and theatre. She is also a playwright, director and acting teacher. She lives in New York City.

Neil made her Broadway debut in Match, (opposite Frank Langella) and played Candida in the Broadway production of Tom Stoppard’s Rock’n’Roll.

Film credits include: Listen Up Phillip, The Longest Week, Simon Killer, Afterschool, Twelve, nonames, Something’s Gotta Give, and others.

Television: guest stars and guest leads on Madoff, The Blacklist, Forever, Blue Bloods, all the Law & Orders, Madigan Men, Ed, The Sopranos, Dudley and she is well-known for five major roles in daytime drama, including Ruby Wright Wheeler on Texas.

Neil is a member of the Actors Center Workshop Company in NYC. She is included in the 2012 book Now you tell me! – 12 Actors Give the Best Advice They Never Got, by Sheridan Scott and Chris Willman.

Her play Moucheron was read in the Miranda Theatre Company’s Liz Smith Reading Series at the Cherry Lane in March 2019. Her play Strange Fits was read at the Atlantic Theater in 2009, and done in a workshop in 2010 at New York Stage and Film.

She has directed her original work at the Williams College Summer Theater Lab, Williams College Theater, the Friday Series at Michael Howard Studios, and the NY Poetry Project.

Neil has taught acting at The Freeman Studio, Michael Howard Studios, NYU Tisch, the National Theater Institute, the Williams College Summer Theater Lab, the MFA Acting Program at Brooklyn College, Connecticut College, and Marymount College.

== Activism ==
In 2016, Neil co-founded (with writer and chef Eugenia Bone) the organization Downtown Women for Change in New York City. DWC is a grassroots organization committed to preserving and advancing women's rights, mentoring women who choose careers in public policy, and working to elect pro-choice, Democratic women and allies to city, state and national office.

== Stage credits ==
=== Broadway ===
- Rock’n’Roll (Tom Stoppard — 2010) – as Candida (also u/s Eleanor/Esme) – Dir: Trevor Nunn
- Match (Stephen Belber — 2004) – as Lisa – (u/s and played) – Dir: Nicholas Martin

=== Off and Off-Off Broadway ===
- Reparations (2019) – Billie Holiday Theatre, as Ginny Pleasance
- Mystery of Love and Sex (2015) – Mitzi Newhouse Theatre at Lincoln Center, as Lucinda (u/s)
- An Oak Tree (2007) – Barrow Street Theatre, as The Father
- Marien’s Kammer (1985) – Ensemble Studio Theatre Marathon, as Marie
- The Cruelties of Mrs. Schnayd (1984) – NY Theatre Studio, as Madeleine
- Asian Shade (1983) – WPA Theatre, as Jean
- The Matchmaker (1980) – Jewish Repertory Theatre, as Ermengarde
- Rocket to the Moon (1979) – Jewish Repertory Theatre, as Cleo Singer
- Clear the Range (1979) – Theatre at St. Clements, as The Girl
- Sexy St. James (1979) – LaMama ETC, as Arden Amici
- The Ride Across Lake Constance (1978) – Theatre at St. Clements, as Elisabeth Bergner
- Four Little Girls (1978) — SoHo Rep, as Marie

=== Regional ===
- Stag's Leap (2019) – Martha’s Vineyard Playhouse
- 20th Century Blues (Susan Miller – 2018 – World Premiere) CATF, as Sil
- Now or Later (Christopher Shinn – 2012 – US Premiere) – Huntington Theatre Co., as Jessica
- In (Bess Wohl – 2011 – World Premiere) – Pioneer Theatre, as Pammie
- Balm in Gilead (1987) – Alley Theatre, Houston, as Darlene
- Of Mice and Men (1987) –Syracuse Stage, as Curley’s Wife
- Old Sins, Long Shadows (1986) – Philadelphia Theatre Company, as Delorah
- Sweet Bird of Youth (1985) – Cincinnati Playhouse in the Park, as Heavenly
- Bus Stop (1982) – Actors Theatre of Louisville, as Cherie
- The Resistible Rise of Arturo Ui (1980) – Hartman Theatre, as Dockdaisy

== Filmography ==
=== Film ===
- Listen Up Philip (2014) – Chelsea
- The Longest Week (2014) — Maribel Valmont
- Pretty Happy (2010) — Cheryl Jacobs
- Nonames (2010) – Mrs. Ellis
- Twelve (2010) – Mimi Kenton
- Afterschool (2008) – Gloria Talbert
- 508 Nelson (2006) – Tammy Millar
- Marci X (2003) – Woman at Auction
- The Science of Love (2003 short) – Ileana
- Something's Gotta Give (2003) – Harry's Old Flame
- Suits (1999) – Sally Parkyn
- Longtime Companion (1989) – Soap Actress
- See No Evil, Hear No Evil (1989) – Sally
- Wall Street (1987) – Elevator Person
- Manhunter (1986) – Eileen

=== Television ===
- Prodigal Son – “Wait & Hope” (2020) as Connie
- Blue Bloods – “Thicker Than Water” (2018) as Joan McCandless
- Madoff (2016)
  - “Redemptions” (2016) as Monica Noel
  - “Fallout” (2016) as Monica Noel
  - “Catch Me If You Cancer” (2016) as Monica Noel
  - “Millions to Billions” (2016) as Monica Noel
- Forever (2014)... “New York Kids“ (2014) as Beth Forester
- The Blacklist – “The Kingmaker” (2014) as Ginny Mitchell
- Law & Order: Criminal Intent – “Playing Dead” (2009) as Josie Hayes-Fitzgerald
- Law & Order (1997-2009, 2026)
  - “Never Say Goodbye“ (2026) as Claire Turner
  - “Lucky Stiff” (2009) as Patricia Klein
  - “Ego” (2001) as Alice Marner
  - “Shadow” (1997) as Lisa Harmon
- One Life to Live (2004-2007) as Paige Miller (71 episodes)
- One Life to Live (1985-1985) as Jeannie Johnson (24 Episodes)
- Law & Order: Special Victims Unit – “Taboo” (2006) as Mrs. Drake
- All My Children (2002-2003) as Casey Wexler (16 episodes)
- Ed – “New School” (2003) as Mandel's attorney
- Madigan Men – “Meet the Wolfes” (2000) as Catherine
- The Sopranos — “A Hit Is a Hit” (1999) as Wendy Krim
- As The World Turns (1992-1994) as Dawn Wheeler (47 episodes)
- Dudley – unaired pilot (1992) as Sheila
- Guiding Light (1987-1989) as Rose McLaren Shayne (94 episodes)
- Another World (1984-1985) as Dr. Emily Benson (78 episodes)
- The Edge of Night (1984) as Mary Louise (2 episodes)
- Search for Tomorrow (1984) as Gwen
- Sessions (1983) as Josh's girlfriend
- Texas (1980-1982) as Ruby Wright (187 episodes)
- Ryan's Hope (1978-1979) as Poppy Lincoln / Teresa Donahue (71 episodes)
