= Ron Hale =

American actor (1946–2024)

- Born: Ronald Hale Thigpen; January 2, 1946; Grand Rapids, Michigan, U.S.
- Died: August 27, 2024 (aged 78); St. George, South Carolina, U.S.
- Years active: 1951–2017

Ronald Hale Thigpen (January 2, 1946 – August 27, 2024) was an American actor best known for his role as Roger Coleridge on the ABC soap opera Ryan's Hope for its entire run (1975–1989). He played the recurring role of Mike Corbin, the father of mobster Sonny Corinthos in the ABC soap opera General Hospital. Hale, who had portrayed Corbin from 1995, before announcing his retirement in 2010. Hale died at his home in St. George, South Carolina, on August 27, 2024, at the age of 78.

== Filmography ==
- Search for Tomorrow (1951, TV Series) – Walt Driscoll (1969)
- A Lovely Way to Die (1968)
- Me, Natalie (1969) – Stanley Dexter
- Love is a Many Splendored Thing (1973, TV Series) – Jim Abbott
- All the President's Men (1976) – Frank Sturgis
- Ryan's Hope (1975–1989, TV Series) – Roger Coleridge
- Matlock (1989, TV Series) – Eldon Williams
- MacGyver (1990, TV Series) – Mike Travers
- Original Intent (1992) – Dr. Johnson
- Trial by Jury (1994) – Bailiff
- The Dark Mist (1996) – Pentakis
- Port Charles (1997, TV Series) – Mike Corbin
- The Brothers Flub (1999) – Squish (voice)
- Sunstorm (2001) – Jack
- Intimate Portrait (2003, TV Series, Vanessa Marcil) – Himself
- General Hospital (1995–2010, TV Series) – Mike Corbin
- The Ghost and the Whale (2017) – Father Reinhart

== Awards and nominations ==
List of Acting Awards and Nominations
Year	Title	Award	Category	Result
1979	Ryan's Hope	Daytime Emmy Award	Daytime Emmy Award for Outstanding Supporting Actor in a Drama Series	Nominated
1980	Ryan's Hope	Daytime Emmy Award	Daytime Emmy Award for Outstanding Supporting Actor in a Drama Series	Nominated
1986	Ryan's Hope	Soap Opera Digest Award	Soap Opera Digest Award for Outstanding Villain in a Drama Series – Daytime	Nominated
