= List of General Hospital awards =

General Hospital is the longest running ABC Daytime television program (soap opera), airing on ABC. Created by Frank and Doris Hursley, who originally set it in a general hospital (hence the title), in an unnamed fictional city. In the 1970s, the city was named Port Charles, New York. The series premiered on April 1, 1963. The following list comprises all of the wins and nominations for the soap opera and are presented by the National Academy of Television Arts and Sciences (NATAS), Directors Guild of America (DGA), and Writers Guild of America Award.

== Awards and nominations ==
=== 1974–1979 ===
Year	Award	Category	Recipient	Role	Result	Ref.
1974	Daytime Emmy Award	Outstanding Drama Series	James Young	Executive Producer	Nominated	
1974	Daytime Emmy Award	Outstanding Actor in a Daytime Drama Series	John Beradino	Steve Hardy	Nominated	
1974	Daytime Emmy Award	Outstanding Actor in a Daytime Drama Series	Peter Hansen	Lee Baldwin	Nominated	
1974	Daytime Emmy Award	Outstanding Actress in a Daytime Drama Series	Rachel Ames	Audrey Hardy	Nominated	
1974	Daytime Emmy Award	Outstanding Drama Series Writing Team	General Hospital		Nominated	
1974	Daytime Emmy Award	Outstanding Sound Mixing	General Hospital		Nominated	
1974	Daytime Emmy Award	Outstanding Lighting Direction	General Hospital		Nominated	
1975	Daytime Emmy Award	Outstanding Actor in a Daytime Drama Series	John Beradino	Steve Hardy	Nominated	
1975	Daytime Emmy Award	Outstanding Actress in a Daytime Drama Series	Rachel Ames	Audrey Hardy	Nominated	
1976	Daytime Emmy Award	Outstanding Actor in a Daytime Drama Series	John Beradino	Steve Hardy	Nominated	
1976	Daytime Emmy Award	Outstanding Actress in a Daytime Drama Series	Denise Alexander	Lesley Williams	Nominated	
1979	Daytime Emmy Award	Outstanding Supporting Actor in a Drama Series	Peter Hansen	Lee Baldwin	Won	
1979	Daytime Emmy Award	Outstanding Actress in a Daytime Drama Series	Rachel Ames	Audrey Hardy	Nominated	
1979	Daytime Emmy Award	Outstanding Actress in a Daytime Drama Series	Susan Brown	Gail Adamson Baldwin	Nominated	

=== 1980–1989 ===
Year	Award	Category	Recipient	Role	Result	Ref.
1980	Daytime Emmy Award	Outstanding Actress in a Daytime Drama Series	Leslie Charleson	Monica Quartermaine	Nominated	
1980	Daytime Emmy Award	Outstanding Direction for a Daytime Drama Series	General Hospital		Nominated	
1981	Daytime Emmy Award	Outstanding Drama Series	Gloria Monty	Executive Producer	Won	
1981	Daytime Emmy Award	Outstanding Actor in a Daytime Drama Series	Anthony Geary	Luke Spencer	Nominated	
1981	Daytime Emmy Award	Outstanding Supporting Actress in a Drama Series	Jane Elliot	Tracy Quartermaine	Won	
1981	Daytime Emmy Award	Outstanding Supporting Actress in a Drama Series	Jacklyn Zeman	Bobbie Jones	Nominated	
1981	Daytime Emmy Award	Outstanding Drama Series Writing Team	General Hospital		Nominated	
1981	Daytime Emmy Award	Outstanding Drama Series Directing Team	General Hospital		Won	
1982	Daytime Emmy Award	Outstanding Drama Series	Gloria Monty	Executive Producer	Nominated	
1982	Daytime Emmy Award	Outstanding Drama Series Directing Team	General Hospital		Won	
1982	Daytime Emmy Award	Outstanding Actor in a Daytime Drama Series	Anthony Geary	Luke Spencer	Won	
1982	Daytime Emmy Award	Outstanding Actor in a Daytime Drama Series	Stuart Damon	Alan Quartermaine	Nominated	
1982	Daytime Emmy Award	Outstanding Supporting Actor in a Drama Series	David Lewis	Edward Quartermaine	Won	
1982	Daytime Emmy Award	Outstanding Supporting Actor in a Drama Series	Douglas Sheehan	Joe Kelly	Nominated	
1982	Daytime Emmy Award	Outstanding Actress in a Daytime Drama Series	Leslie Charleson	Monica Quartermaine	Nominated	
1983	Daytime Emmy Award	Outstanding Drama Series	Gloria Monty	Executive Producer	Nominated	
1983	Daytime Emmy Award	Outstanding Lead Actor in a Drama Series	Anthony Geary	Luke Spencer	Nominated	
1983	Daytime Emmy Award	Outstanding Lead Actor in a Drama Series	Stuart Damon	Alan Quartermaine	Nominated	
1983	Daytime Emmy Award	Outstanding Actress in a Daytime Drama Series	Leslie Charleson	Monica Quartermaine	Nominated	
1983	Daytime Emmy Award	Outstanding Supporting Actor in a Drama Series	David Lewis	Edward Quartermaine	Nominated	
1983	Daytime Emmy Award	Outstanding Supporting Actor in a Drama Series	John Stamos	Blackie Parrish	Nominated	
1983	Daytime Emmy Award	Outstanding Supporting Actress in a Drama Series	Robin Mattson	Heather Webber	Nominated	
1984	Daytime Emmy Award	Outstanding Drama Series	Gloria Monty	Executive Producer	Won	
1984	Daytime Emmy Award	Outstanding Supporting Actor in a Drama Series	Stuart Damon	Alan Quartermaine	Nominated	
1984	Daytime Emmy Award	Outstanding Supporting Actor in a Drama Series	David Lewis	Edward Quartermaine	Nominated	
1984	Daytime Emmy Award	Outstanding Supporting Actress in a Drama Series	Loanne Bishop	Rose Kelly	Nominated	
1985	Daytime Emmy Award	Outstanding Drama Series	Gloria Monty	Executive Producer	Nominated	
1985	Daytime Emmy Award	Outstanding Supporting Actor in a Drama Series	David Lewis	Edward Quartermaine	Nominated	
1985	Daytime Emmy Award	Outstanding Supporting Actress in a Drama Series	Norma Connolly	Ruby Anderson	Nominated	
1985	Daytime Emmy Award	Daytime Emmy Award for Outstanding Younger Actor in a Drama Series	Jack P. Wagner	Frisco Jones	Nominated	
1986	Daytime Emmy Award	Outstanding Drama Series	Gloria Monty	Executive Producer	Nominated	
1988	Daytime Emmy Award	Outstanding Drama Series	Gloria Monty	Executive Producer	Nominated	
1988	Daytime Emmy Award	Outstanding Supporting Actor in a Drama Series	David Lewis	Edward Quartermaine	Nominated	
1989	Daytime Emmy Award	Outstanding Drama Series	H. Wesley Kenney	Executive Producer	Nominated	
1989	Daytime Emmy Award	Daytime Emmy Award for Outstanding Younger Actress in a Drama Series	Kimberly McCullough	Robin Scorpio	Won	

=== 1990–1999 ===
Year	Award	Category	Recipient	Role	Result	Ref.
1990	Daytime Emmy Award	Outstanding Actress in a Daytime Drama Series	Finola Hughes	Anna Devane	Nominated	
1990	Daytime Emmy Award	Outstanding Supporting Actor in a Drama Series	Kin Shriner	Scott Baldwin	Nominated	
1990	Daytime Emmy Award	Outstanding Supporting Actress in a Drama Series	Mary Jo Catlett	Mary Finnegan	Nominated	
1990	Daytime Emmy Award	Outstanding Supporting Actress in a Drama Series	Lynn Herring	Lucy Coe	Nominated	
1990	Daytime Emmy Award	Outstanding Juvenile Female in a Daytime Drama Series	Kimberly McCullough	Robin Scorpio	Nominated	
1991	Daytime Emmy Award	Outstanding Lead Actress in a Drama Series	Finola Hughes	Anna Devane	Won	
1991	Daytime Emmy Award	Outstanding Supporting Actor	Kin Shriner	Scott Baldwin	Nominated	
1991	Daytime Emmy Award	Outstanding Supporting Actor	Stuart Damon	Alan Quartermaine	Nominated	
1991	Daytime Emmy Award	Outstanding Younger Actress in a Drama Series	Kimberly McCullough	Robin Scorpio	Nominated	
1992	Daytime Emmy Award	Outstanding Supporting Actress in a Drama Series	Lynn Herring	Lucy Coe	Nominated	
1993	Daytime Emmy Award	Outstanding Supporting Actor in a Drama Series	Gerald Anthony	Marco Dane	Won	
1993	Daytime Emmy Award	Outstanding Supporting Actor in a Drama Series	Kin Shriner	Scott Baldwin	Nominated	
1993	Daytime Emmy Award	Outstanding Supporting Actress in a Drama Series	Jane Elliot	Tracy Quartermaine	Nominated	
1994	Daytime Emmy Award	Outstanding Supporting Actress in a Drama Series	Sharon Wyatt	Tiffany Hill	Nominated	
1995	Daytime Emmy Award	Outstanding Drama Series	Wendy Riche	Executive Producer	Won	
1995	Daytime Emmy Award	Outstanding Drama Series Writing Team	General Hospital		Won	
1995	Daytime Emmy Award	Outstanding Lead Actor in a Drama Series	Brad Maule	Tony Jones	Nominated	
1995	Daytime Emmy Award	Outstanding Supporting Actress in a Drama Series	Rena Sofer	Lois Cerullo	Won	
1995	Daytime Emmy Award	Outstanding Younger Actor in a Drama Series	Jonathan Jackson	Lucky Spencer	Won	
1995	Daytime Emmy Award	Outstanding Younger Actress in a Drama Series	Kimberly McCullough	Robin Scorpio	Nominated	
1995	Creative Arts Emmy Award^{1}	Costume Design for a Drama Series	General Hospital		Won	
1995	Writers Guild of America Award	Daytime Serials	Claire Labine; Matthew Labine; Eleanor Mancusi; Ralph Ellis; Meg Bennett; Michele Val Jean; Stephanie Braxton; Lewis Arlt; Karen Harris		Won	
1996	Daytime Emmy Award	Outstanding Drama Series	Wendy Riche	Executive Producer	Won	
1996	Daytime Emmy Award	Outstanding Lead Actor in a Drama Series	Maurice Benard	Sonny Corinthos	Nominated	
1996	Daytime Emmy Award	Outstanding Supporting Actor in a Drama Series	Stuart Damon	Alan Quartermaine	Nominated	
1996	Daytime Emmy Award	Outstanding Supporting Actor in a Drama Series	Michael Sutton	Stone Cates	Nominated	
1996	Daytime Emmy Award	Outstanding Supporting Actress in a Drama Series	Rosalind Cash	Mary Mae Ward	Nominated ^{2}	
1996	Daytime Emmy Award	Outstanding Younger Actress in a Drama Series	Kimberly McCullough	Robin Scorpio	Won	
1996	Creative Arts Emmy Award^{1}	Costume Design for a Drama Series	General Hospital		Won	
1996	Directors Guild of America Award	Outstanding Directorial Achievement in Daytime Serials	General Hospital		Won	
1997	Daytime Emmy Award	Outstanding Drama Series	Wendy Riche	Executive Producer	Won	
1997	Daytime Emmy Award	Outstanding Drama Series Writing Team	General Hospital		Nominated	
1997	Daytime Emmy Award	Outstanding Drama Series Directing Team	General Hospital		Nominated	
1997	Daytime Emmy Award	Outstanding Lead Actor in a Drama Series	Anthony Geary	Luke Spencer	Nominated	
1997	Daytime Emmy Award	Outstanding Lead Actress in a Drama Series	Genie Francis	Laura Spencer	Nominated	
1997	Daytime Emmy Award	Outstanding Supporting Actor in a Drama Series	Maurice Benard	Sonny Corinthos	Nominated	
1997	Daytime Emmy Award	Outstanding Supporting Actor in a Drama Series	Stuart Damon	Alan Quartermaine	Nominated	
1997	Daytime Emmy Award	Outstanding Supporting Actor in a Drama Series	Brad Maule	Tony Jones	Nominated	
1997	Daytime Emmy Award	Outstanding Supporting Actress in a Drama Series	Vanessa Marcil	Brenda Barrett	Nominated	
1997	Daytime Emmy Award	Outstanding Supporting Actress in a Drama Series	Jacklyn Zeman	Bobbie Jones	Nominated	
1997	Daytime Emmy Award	Outstanding Younger Actor in a Drama Series	Steve Burton	Jason Morgan	Nominated	
1997	Daytime Emmy Award	Outstanding Younger Actor in a Drama Series	Jonathan Jackson	Lucky Spencer	Nominated	
1997	Daytime Emmy Award	Outstanding Younger Actress in a Drama Series	Sarah Joy Brown	Carly Roberts	Won	
1997	Daytime Emmy Award	Outstanding Younger Actress in a Drama Series	Kimberly McCullough	Robin Scorpio	Nominated	
1997	Creative Arts Emmy Award^{1}	Costume Design for a Drama Series	General Hospital		Won	
1997	Creative Arts Emmy Award^{1}	Outstanding Achievement in Live & Direct To Tape Sound Mixing For A Drama Series	General Hospital		Won	
1998	Daytime Emmy Award	Outstanding Drama Series	Wendy Riche	Executive Producer	Nominated	
1998	Daytime Emmy Award	Outstanding Drama Series Writing Team	General Hospital		Nominated	
1998	Daytime Emmy Award	Outstanding Drama Series Directing Team	General Hospital		Nominated	
1998	Daytime Emmy Award	Outstanding Lead Actor in a Drama Series	Anthony Geary	Luke Spencer	Nominated	
1998	Daytime Emmy Award	Outstanding Lead Actress in a Drama Series	Jacklyn Zeman	Bobbie Jones	Nominated	
1998	Daytime Emmy Award	Outstanding Supporting Actor in a Drama Series	Steve Burton	Jason Morgan	Won	
1998	Daytime Emmy Award	Outstanding Supporting Actress in a Drama Series	Vanessa Marcil	Brenda Barrett	Nominated	
1998	Daytime Emmy Award	Outstanding Younger Actor in a Drama Series	Jonathan Jackson	Lucky Spencer	Won	
1998	Daytime Emmy Award	Outstanding Younger Actor in a Drama Series	Tyler Christopher	Nikolas Cassadine	Nominated	
1998	Daytime Emmy Award	Outstanding Younger Actress in a Drama Series	Sarah Joy Brown	Carly Roberts	Won	
1998	Creative Arts Emmy Award^{1}	Outstanding Achievement in Live & Direct To Tape Sound Mixing For A Drama Series	General Hospital		Nominated	
1998	Creative Arts Emmy Award^{1}	Costume Design for a Drama Series	General Hospital		Won	
1998	Creative Arts Emmy Award^{1}	Multiple Camera Editing for a Drama Series	General Hospital		Nominated	
1998	Creative Arts Emmy Award^{1}	Hairstyling for a Drama Series	General Hospital		Nominated	
1998	Creative Arts Emmy Award^{1}	Lighting Direction for a Drama Series	General Hospital		Nominated	
1998	Creative Arts Emmy Award^{1}	Makeup for a Drama Series	General Hospital		Nominated	
1998	Creative Arts Emmy Award^{1}	Outstanding Achievement in Live & Direct To Tape Sound Mixing For A Drama Series	General Hospital		Nominated	
1998	Directors Guild of America	Outstanding Directorial Achievement in Daytime Serials	General Hospital		Won	
1998	Writers Guild of America Award	Daytime Serials	General Hospital		Won	
1999	Daytime Emmy Award	Outstanding Drama Series	Wendy Riche	Executive Producer	Won	
1999	Daytime Emmy Award	Outstanding Drama Series Writing Team	General Hospital		Won	
1999	Daytime Emmy Award	Outstanding Drama Series Directing Team	General Hospital		Nominated	
1999	Daytime Emmy Award	Outstanding Lead Actor in a Drama Series	Anthony Geary	Luke Spencer	Won	
1999	Daytime Emmy Award	Outstanding Supporting Actor in a Drama Series	Stuart Damon	Alan Quartermaine	Won	
1999	Daytime Emmy Award	Outstanding Younger Actor in a Drama Series	Jonathan Jackson	Lucky Spencer	Won	
1999	Daytime Emmy Award	Outstanding Younger Actress in a Drama Series	Sarah Joy Brown	Carly Roberts	Nominated	
1999	Daytime Emmy Award	Outstanding Younger Actress in a Drama Series	Rebecca Herbst	Elizabeth Webber	Nominated	
1999	Creative Arts Emmy Award^{1}	Costume Design for a Drama Series	General Hospital		Won	
1999	Creative Arts Emmy Award^{1}	Multiple Camera Editing for a Drama Series	General Hospital		Nominated	
1999	Creative Arts Emmy Award^{1}	Hairstyling for a Drama Series	General Hospital		Nominated	
1999	Creative Arts Emmy Award^{1}	Makeup for a Drama Series	General Hospital		Won	
1999	Creative Arts Emmy Award^{1}	Song for a Drama Series	General Hospital–Just for You		Won	

=== 2000–2009 ===
Year	Award	Category	Recipient	Role	Result	Ref.
2000	Daytime Emmy Award	Outstanding Drama Series	Wendy Riche	Executive Producer	Won	
2000	Daytime Emmy Award	Outstanding Drama Series Directing Team	General Hospital		Won	
2000	Daytime Emmy Award	Outstanding Lead Actor in a Drama Series	Anthony Geary	Luke Spencer	Won	
2000	Daytime Emmy Award	Outstanding Supporting Actor in a Drama Series	Steve Burton	Jason Quartermaine	Nominated	
2000	Daytime Emmy Award	Outstanding Supporting Actress in a Drama Series	Sarah Joy Brown	Carly Roberts	Won	
2000	Daytime Emmy Award	Outstanding Supporting Actress in a Drama Series	Nancy Lee Grahn	Alexis Davis	Nominated	
2000	Daytime Emmy Award	Outstanding Younger Actor in a Drama Series	Jonathan Jackson	Lucky Spencer	Nominated	
2000	Creative Arts Emmy Award^{1}	Costume Design for a Drama Series	General Hospital		Nominated	
2000	Creative Arts Emmy Award^{1}	Multiple Camera Editing for a Drama Series	General Hospital		Nominated	
2000	Creative Arts Emmy Award^{1}	Hairstyling for a Drama Series	General Hospital		Nominated	
2000	Creative Arts Emmy Award^{1}	Makeup for a Drama Series	General Hospital		Nominated	
2001	Daytime Emmy Award	Outstanding Drama Series	Wendy Riche	Executive Producer	Nominated	
2002	Daytime Emmy Award	Outstanding Younger Actor in a Drama Series	Jacob Young	Lucky Spencer	Won	
2002	Creative Arts Emmy Award^{1}	Outstanding Achievement in Multiple Camera Editing For A Drama Series	General Hospital		Nominated	
2002	Creative Arts Emmy Award^{1}	Hairstyling for a Drama Series	General Hospital		Nominated	
2002	Creative Arts Emmy Award^{1}	Makeup for a Drama Series	General Hospital		Nominated	
2002	Creative Arts Emmy Award^{1}	Song for a Drama Series	General Hospital–Barefoot Ballet		Won	
2002	Creative Arts Emmy Award^{1}	Song for a Drama Series	General Hospital–How Long		Nominated	
2002	Directors Guild of America	Outstanding Directorial Achievement in Daytime Serials	General Hospital		Won	
2003	Daytime Emmy Award	Outstanding Drama Series Writing Team	General Hospital		Won	
2003	Daytime Emmy Award	Outstanding Lead Actor in a Drama Series	Maurice Benard	Sonny Corinthos	Won	
2003	Daytime Emmy Award	Outstanding Lead Actress in a Drama Series	Nancy Lee Grahn	Alexis Davis	Nominated	
2003	Daytime Emmy Award	Outstanding Supporting Actress in a Drama Series	Vanessa Marcil	Brenda Barrett	Won	
2003	Daytime Emmy Award	Outstanding Supporting Actress in a Drama Series	Robin Christopher	Skye Chandler	Nominated	
2003	Daytime Emmy Award	Outstanding Younger Actor in a Drama Series	Chad Brannon	Zander Smith	Nominated	
2003	Daytime Emmy Award	Outstanding Younger Actress in a Drama Series	Alicia Leigh Willis	Courtney Matthews	Nominated	
2003	Creative Arts Emmy Award^{1}	Outstanding Casting for a Drama Series	Mark Teschner, CSA	Casting director	Nominated	
2003	Creative Arts Emmy Award^{1}	Outstanding Achievement in Multiple Camera Editing For A Drama Series	General Hospital		Won	
2003	Creative Arts Emmy Award^{1}	Outstanding Achievement in Hairstyling For A Drama Series	Anzhela Adzhiyan; Jennifer Petrovich; Lauran Poole	Hairstylists	Nominated	
2003	Creative Arts Emmy Award^{1}	Outstanding Achievement in Makeup For A Drama Series	Donna Messina; Dara Jaramillo; Bobbie Roberts; Melinda Osgood; Angela Ackley; Tamara Papirian	Head Makeup Artist; Makeup Artist; Makeup Artist; Makeup Artist; Makeup Artist	Nominated	
2004	Daytime Emmy Award	Outstanding Drama Series	Jill Farren Phelps	Executive producer	Nominated	
2004	Daytime Emmy Award	Outstanding Drama Series Writing Team	General Hospital		Nominated	
2004	Daytime Emmy Award	Outstanding Drama Series Directing Team	General Hospital		Won	
2004	Daytime Emmy Award	Outstanding Lead Actor n a Drama Series	Anthony Geary	Luke Spencer	Won	
2004	Daytime Emmy Award	Outstanding Lead Actor n a Drama Series	Maurice Benard	Sonny Corinthos	Nominated	
2004	Daytime Emmy Award	Outstanding Lead Actress n a Drama Series	Tamara Braun	Carly Corinthos	Nominated	
2004	Daytime Emmy Award	Outstanding Lead Actress n a Drama Series	Nancy Lee Grahn	Alexis Davis	Nominated	
2004	Daytime Emmy Award	Outstanding Supporting Actor in a Drama Series	Rick Hearst	Ric Lansing	Won	
2004	Daytime Emmy Award	Outstanding Younger Actor in a Drama Series	Chad Brannon	Zander Smith	Won	
2004	Daytime Emmy Award	Outstanding Younger Actor in a Drama Series	Scott Clifton	Dillon Quartermaine	Nominated	
2004	Daytime Emmy Award	Outstanding Younger Actress in a Drama Series	Alicia Leigh Willis	Courtney Matthews	Nominated	
2004	Daytime Emmy Award	Lifetime Achievement Award	Rachel Ames	Audrey March Hardy	Won	
2004	Daytime Emmy Award	Lifetime Achievement Award	Anna Lee ^{2}	Lila Quartermaine	Won	
2004	Creative Arts Emmy Award^{1}	Makeup for a Drama Series	General Hospital		Won	
2004	Creative Arts Emmy Award^{1}	Multiple Camera Editing for a Drama Series	General Hospital		Won	
2004	Directors Guild of America	Outstanding Directorial Achievement in Daytime Serials	General Hospital		Won	
2005	Daytime Emmy Award	Outstanding Drama Series	Jill Farren Phelps	Executive Producer	Won	
2005	Daytime Emmy Award	Outstanding Drama Series Directing Team	General Hospital		Won	
2005	Daytime Emmy Award	Outstanding Drama Series Writing Team	General Hospital		Nominated	
2005	Daytime Emmy Award	Outstanding Supporting Actress in a Drama Series	Natalia Livingston	Emily Quartermaine	Won	
2005	Creative Arts Emmy Award^{1}	Outstanding Casting Director for a Drama Series	Mark Teschner, CSA	Casting director	Nominated	
2005	Creative Arts Emmy Award^{1}	Outstanding Achievement in a Main Title Design	General Hospital		Won	
2006	Daytime Emmy Award	Outstanding Drama Series	Jill Farren Phelps	Executive Producer	Won	
2006	Daytime Emmy Award	Outstanding Drama Series Directing Team	General Hospital		Won	
2006	Daytime Emmy Award	Outstanding Lead Actor in a Drama Series	Anthony Geary	Luke Spencer	Won	
2006	Creative Arts Emmy Award^{1}	Outstanding Casting Director for a Drama Series	Mark Teschner, CSA	Casting director	Won	
2006	Creative Arts Emmy Award^{1}	Outstanding Achievement in Multiple Camera Editing For A Drama Series	General Hospital		Nominated	
2006	Creative Arts Emmy Award^{1}	Outstanding Achievement in Hairstyling For A Drama Series	General Hospital		Won	
2006	Creative Arts Emmy Award^{1}	Outstanding Original Song for a Drama Series	General Hospital–Where You Are		Nominated	
2006	Creative Arts Emmy Award^{1}	Outstanding Achievement in Live & Direct to Tape Sound Mixing for a Drama Series	General Hospital		Nominated	
2006	Directors Guild of America Award	Outstanding Directing – Daytime Serials	William Ludel	Director	Nominated	
2006	Directors Guild of America Award	Outstanding Directing – Daytime Serials	Scott McKinsey	Director	Nominated	
2007	Daytime Emmy Award	Outstanding Drama Series Writing Team	General Hospital		Nominated	
2007	Daytime Emmy Award	Outstanding Drama Series Directing Team	General Hospital		Nominated	
2007	Daytime Emmy Award	Outstanding Supporting Actor in a Drama Series	Rick Hearst	Ric Lansing	Won	
2007	Daytime Emmy Award	Outstanding Supporting Actress in a Drama Series	Genie Francis	Laura Spencer	Won	
2007	Daytime Emmy Award	Outstanding Younger Actress in a Drama Series	Julie Marie Berman	Lulu Spencer	Nominated	
2007	Creative Arts Emmy Award^{1}	Outstanding Casting Director for a Drama Series	Mark Teschner, CSA	Casting director	Won	
2007	Creative Arts Emmy Award^{1}	Outstanding Achievement in Makeup For A Drama Series	General Hospital		Nominated	
2007	Creative Arts Emmy Award^{1}	Outstanding Achievement in Live & Direct To Tape Sound Mixing For A Drama Series	General Hospital		Nominated	
2007	Directors Guild of America Award	Outstanding Directing – Daytime Serials	Scott McKinsey	Director	Nominated	
2008	Daytime Emmy Award	Outstanding Drama Series	Jill Farren Phelps	Executive Producer	Won	
2008	Daytime Emmy Award	Outstanding Drama Series Writing Team	General Hospital		Nominated	
2008	Daytime Emmy Award	Outstanding Drama Series Directing Team	General Hospital		Nominated	
2008	Daytime Emmy Award	Outstanding Lead Actor in a Drama Series	Anthony Geary	Luke Spencer	Won	
2008	Creative Arts Emmy Award^{1}	Outstanding Casting Director for a Drama Series	Mark Teschner, CSA	Casting director	Won	
2008	Creative Arts Emmy Award^{1}	Outstanding Achievement in Art Direction/Set Decoration/Scenic Design for a Drama Series	General Hospital		Nominated	
2008	Directors Guild of America Award	Outstanding Directing – Daytime Serials	William Ludel	Director	Nominated	
2008	Directors Guild of America Award	Outstanding Directing – Daytime Serials	Owen Renfroe	Director	Nominated	
2009	Daytime Emmy Award	Outstanding Drama Series Writing Team	General Hospital	Writing team^{2}	Won	
2009	Daytime Emmy Award	Outstanding Lead Actor in a Drama Series	Anthony Geary	Luke Spencer	Nominated	
2009	Daytime Emmy Award	Outstanding Younger Actress in a Drama Series	Julie Marie Berman	Lulu Spencer	Won	
2009	Daytime Emmy Award	Outstanding Younger Actress in a Drama Series	Kirsten Storms	Maxie Jones	Nominated	
2009	Creative Arts Emmy Award^{1}	Outstanding Casting Director for a Drama Series	Mark Teschner, CSA	Casting director	Nominated	
2009	Creative Arts Emmy Award^{1}	Outstanding Achievement in Hairstyling For A Drama Series	General Hospital		Nominated	
2009	Directors Guild of America Award	Outstanding Directing – Daytime Serials	William Ludel	Director	Nominated	

=== 2010–present ===
Year	Award	Category	Recipient	Role	Result	Ref.
2010	Daytime Emmy Award	Outstanding Drama Series	Jill Farren Phelps; Robert Guza, Jr.; Mary O'Leary; Michelle Henry; Mercer Barrows	Executive Producer; Consulting Producer; Producer; Producer; Producer	Nominated	
2010	Daytime Emmy Award	Outstanding Drama Series Directing Team	General Hospital		Won	
2010	Daytime Emmy Award	Outstanding Younger Actress in a Drama Series	Julie Marie Berman	Lulu Spencer	Won	
2010	Creative Arts Emmy Award^{1}	Multiple Camera Editing for a Drama Series	General Hospital		Won	
2010	Creative Arts Emmy Award^{1}	Technical Direction/Electronic Camera/Video Control for a Drama Series	General Hospital		Won	
2010	Directors Guild of America Award	Outstanding Directing – Daytime Serials	Owen Renfroe	Director	Nominated	
2011	Daytime Emmy Award	Outstanding Drama Series	Jill Farren Phelps; Robert Guza, Jr.; Mary O'Leary; Michelle Henry; Mercer Barrows	Exec. Producer; Consulting Producer; Producer; Producer; Producer	Nominated	
2011	Daytime Emmy Award	Outstanding Drama Series Directing Team	William Ludel; Scott McKinsey; Owen Renfroe; Phideaux Xavier; Pete Fillmore; Dave Macleod; Denise Van Cleave; Christine Magarian Ucar; Penny Pengra; RC Cates; Craig McManus; Crystal Craft; Christine Cooper; Allison Reames; Andrea Compton	Director; Director; Director; Director; Associate Director; Assoc. Director; Assoc. Director; Assoc. Director; Assoc. Director; Stage Manager; Stage Manager; Production Assoc.; Production Assoc.; Production Assoc.	Nominated	
2011	Daytime Emmy Award	Outstanding Lead Actor in a Drama Series	Maurice Benard	Sonny Corinthos	Nominated	
2011	Daytime Emmy Award	Outstanding Lead Actress in a Drama Series	Laura Wright	Carly Corinthos Jacks	Won	
2011	Daytime Emmy Award	Outstanding Supporting Actor in a Drama Series	Jonathan Jackson	Lucky Spencer	Won	
2011	Daytime Emmy Award	Outstanding Supporting Actor in a Drama Series	Jason Thompson	Patrick Drake	Nominated	
2011	Daytime Emmy Award	Outstanding Supporting Actress in a Drama Series	Nancy Lee Grahn	Alexis Davis	Nominated	
2011	Daytime Emmy Award	Outstanding Younger Actor in a Drama Series	Chad Duell	Michael Corinthos	Nominated	
2011	Daytime Emmy Award	Outstanding Younger Actress in a Drama Series	Lexi Ainsworth	Kristina Davis	Nominated	
2011	Creative Arts Emmy Award^{1}	Outstanding Casting Director for a Drama Series	Mark Teschner, CSA	Casting director	Won	
2011	Creative Arts Emmy Award^{1}	New Approaches - Daytime Entertainment - "What If..."	Brian Briskman; Sue Johnson; Adam Rockmore; Leeanne Irvin; John Corser; Frank Valentini; Sara Saedi; Delara Adams-Warom	Exec. Producer; Exec. Producer; Exec. Producer; Producer; Producer; Director; Writer; Assoc. Producer	Nominated	
2011	Creative Arts Emmy Award^{1}	Art Direction/Set Decoration/Scenic Design for a Drama Series	Chip Dox; Daniel Proett; Jennifer Elliott; Andrew Evashchen	Production Designer; Art Director; Set Decorator; Set Decorator	Won	
2011	Creative Arts Emmy Award^{1}	Costume Design for a Drama Series	Mary Iannelli	Costume designer	Nominated	
2011	Creative Arts Emmy Award^{1}	Outstanding Achievement in Music Direction And Composition For A Drama Series	RC Cates; Dave Macleod; Rick Krizman; Dominic Messinger	Music Supervisor/Composer; Music Supervisor; Composer; Composer	Nominated	
2011	Creative Arts Emmy Award^{1}	Outstanding Achievement in Multiple Camera Editing For A Drama Series	Peter Fillmore; David Gonzalez; Robert Crump; Christine Magarian; Denise Van Cleave; Penny Pengra	Senior Editor; Editor; Editor; Editor; Editor; Editor	Nominated	
2011	Creative Arts Emmy Award^{1}	Technical Direction/Electronic Camera/Video Control for a Drama Series	Averill Perry; Jim Ralston; DJ Diomedes; Dale Carlson; Craig Camou; Dean Cosenella; Charles Barrett	Technical Director; Technical Director; Camera Operator; Camera Operator; Camera Operator; Camera Operator; Video Control	Won	
2011	Creative Arts Emmy Award^{1}	Lighting Direction for a Drama Series	Vincent Steib; Tom Markle	Lighting designers	Won	
2011	Creative Arts Emmy Award^{1}	Stunt Coordination	Tim Davison	Stunt coordinator	Won	
2011	Creative Arts Emmy Award^{1}	Outstanding Achievement in Live & Direct To Tape Sound Mixing For A Drama Series	Nick Kleissas; Elyse Pecora; Nick Marcus; Donald Smith; Stanley Magnone; Fred Fryrear; Christine Tyson; Sandy Masone	Production Mixer; Pre-Production Mixer; Post-Production Mixer; Post-Production Mixer; Boom Operator; Boom Operator; Boom Operator; Boom Operator	Nominated	
2011	Creative Arts Emmy Award^{1}	Promotional Announcement - Episodic - Brenda's Back	Mark Feldstein; Brad Roth; Scott Tucker; Jonas Morganstein; Adam Rockmore; Chris Stifel; Sara Cahill; Nancy Pothier; Vincent Ruiz-Abagado; Alexis Chavez; Hema Mulchandani	Exec. Producer; Exec. Producer; Exec. Producer ABC Daytime; Chief Creative Director/ Exec. Producer; SVP of Marketing ABC Daytime & News & SOAPnet; Director; Creative Director; Writer; Art Director; Editor; Lead Producer	Nominated	
2011	Creative Arts Emmy Award^{1}	Song for a Drama Series	"Bad For You" by Rick Krizman	Composer & Lyricist	Won	
2011	Creative Arts Emmy Award^{1}	Song for a Drama Series	“Home Again” by Robert Hartry	Composer & Lyricist	Nominated	
2011	Writers Guild of America Award	Daytime Serials	Meg Bennett^{4}; Robert Guza, Jr.^{5}; Nathan Fissell; David Goldschmid; Karen Harris; Elizabeth Korte; Mary Sue Price; David F. Ryan; Tracey Thomson; Michele Val Jean; Susan Wald	Writing Team	Nominated	
2011	Directors Guild of America Award	Outstanding Directing – Daytime Serials	Scott McKinsey	Director	Nominated	
2011	Directors Guild of America Award	Outstanding Directing – Daytime Serials	William Ludel	Director	Won	
2012	Daytime Emmy Award	Outstanding Drama Series	Jill Farren Phelps	Exec. Producer	Won	
2012	Daytime Emmy Award	Outstanding Drama Series Directing Team	General Hospital		Won	
2012	Daytime Emmy Award	Outstanding Drama Series Writing Team	General Hospital		Nominated	
2012	Daytime Emmy Award	Outstanding Lead Actor in a Drama Series	Anthony Geary	Luke Spencer	Won	
2012	Daytime Emmy Award	Outstanding Lead Actor in a Drama Series	Maurice Benard	Sonny Corinthos	Nominated	
2012	Daytime Emmy Award	Outstanding Lead Actress in a Drama Series	Laura Wright	Carly Corinthos Jacks	Nominated	
2012	Daytime Emmy Award	Outstanding Supporting Actor in a Drama Series	Jonathan Jackson	Lucky Spencer	Won	
2012	Daytime Emmy Award	Outstanding Supporting Actor in a Drama Series	Bradford Anderson	Damian Spinelli	Nominated	
2012	Daytime Emmy Award	Outstanding Supporting Actor in a Drama Series	Sean Blakemore	Shawn Butler	Nominated	
2012	Daytime Emmy Award	Outstanding Supporting Actor in a Drama Series	Jason Thompson	Patrick Drake	Nominated	
2012	Daytime Emmy Award	Outstanding Supporting Actress in a Drama Series	Nancy Lee Grahn	Alexis Davis	Won	
2012	Daytime Emmy Award	Outstanding Supporting Actress in a Drama Series	Rebecca Herbst	Elizabeth Webber	Nominated	
2012	Daytime Emmy Award	Outstanding Younger Actor in a Drama Series	Chad Duell	Michael Corinthos	Nominated	
2012	Daytime Emmy Award	Outstanding Younger Actor in a Drama Series	Nathan Parsons	Ethan Lovett	Nominated	
2012	Creative Arts Emmy Award^{1}	Casting for a Drama Series	Mark Teschner, CSA	Casting director	Won	
2012	Creative Arts Emmy Award^{1}	Technical Direction/Electronic Camera/Video Control for a Drama Series	Averill Perry; Kevin Carr; DJ Diomedes; Dale Carlson; Craig Camou; Dean Cosenella; Antonio Simone; Charles Barrett	Technical Director; Technical Director; Camera Operator; Camera Operator; Camera Operator; Video Control; Video Control	Won	
2012	Creative Arts Emmy Award^{1}	Costume Design for a Drama Series	Mary Iannelli	Costume designer	Won	
2012	Creative Arts Emmy Award^{1}	Outstanding Drama Series Directing Team	William Ludel; Scott McKinsey; Owen Renfroe; Phideaux Xavier; RC Cates; Dave Macleod; Christine Magarian Ucar; Penny Pengra; Peter Fillmore; Denise Van Cleave; Craig McManus; Crystal Craft; Christine Cooper; Allison Reames; Andrea Compton	Director; Director; Director; Director; Assoc. Director; Assoc. Director; Assoc. Director; Assoc. Director; Assoc. Director; Stage Manager; Stage Manager; Production Assoc.; Production Assoc.; Production Assoc.	Won	
2012	Creative Arts Emmy Award^{1}	Outstanding Drama Series Writing Team	Garin Wolf; Robert Guza; David Goldschmid; Meg Bennett; Shelly Altman; Tracey Thomson; Michael Conforti; Elizabeth Korte; Michele Val Jean; Mary Sue Price; Susan Wald; Nathan Fissell	Head Writer; Head Writer; Breakdown Writer; Assoc. Head Writer; Assoc. Head Writer; Assoc. Head Writer; Assoc. Head Writer; Assoc. Head Writer; Script Writer; Script Writer; Script Writer; Script Writer	Nominated	
2012	Creative Arts Emmy Award^{1}	Outstanding Achievement in Hairstyling For A Drama Series	Anzhela Adzhiyan; Jennifer Petrovich; Lauran Poole	Hairstylists	Nominated	
2012	Creative Arts Emmy Award^{1}	Outstanding Achievement in Makeup For A Drama Series	Donna Messina; Dara Jaramillo; Bobbie Roberts; Melinda Osgood; Angela Ackley; Tamara Papirian	Head Makeup Artist; Makeup Artist; Makeup Artist; Makeup Artist; Makeup Artist	Nominated	
2012	Creative Arts Emmy Award^{1}	Song for a Drama Series	Dust–|: Robert Howard Hartry; Benjamin West	Composer & Lyricist	Won	
2012	Creative Arts Emmy Award^{1}	Outstanding Stunt Coordination	Tim Davison	Stunt Coordinator	Nominated	
2012	Creative Arts Emmy Award^{1}	Promotional Announcement - Episodic	General Hospital		Won	
2013	Daytime Emmy Award	Outstanding Drama Series	Frank Valentini; Mary-Kelly Weir; Michelle Henry; Mercer Barrows	Exec. Producer; Producer; Producer; Producer	Nominated	
2013	Daytime Emmy Award	Outstanding Drama Series Directing Team	William Ludel; Larry Carpenter; Frank Valentini; Phideaux Xavier; Scott McKinsey; Owen Renfroe; Peter Fillmore; Penny Pengra; Denise Van Cleave; Christine Magarian Ucar; Paul Glass; Dave Macleod; Christine Cooper; Crystal Craft; Craig McManus; Allison Reames	Director; Director; Director; Director; Director; Director; Assoc. Director; Assoc. Director; Assoc. Director; Assoc. Director; Assoc. Director; Assoc. Director; Assoc. Director; Stage Manager; Stage Manager; Production Assoc.	Nominated	
2013	Daytime Emmy Award	Outstanding Drama Series Writing Team	Ron Carlivati; Shelly Altman; Jean Passanante; Chris Van Etten; Anna Theresa Cascio; Kate Hall; Elizabeth Page; Scott Sickles; Katherine Schock; Elizabeth Korte	Head Writer; Breakdown Writer; Breakdown Writer; Breakdown Writer; Breakdown Writer; Script Writer; Script Writer; Script Writer; Script Writer; Editor	Nominated	
2013	Daytime Emmy Award	Outstanding Lead Actor in a Drama Series	Jason Thompson	Patrick Drake	Nominated	
2013	Daytime Emmy Award	Outstanding Supporting Actor in a Drama Series	Bradford Anderson	Damian Spinelli	Nominated	
2013	Daytime Emmy Award	Outstanding Supporting Actress in a Drama Series	Julie Marie Berman	Lulu Spencer	Won	
2013	Daytime Emmy Award	Outstanding Younger Actress in a Drama Series	Kristen Alderson	Star Manning	Won	
2013	Daytime Emmy Award	Outstanding Younger Actress in a Drama Series	Lindsey Morgan	Kristina Corinthos Davis	Nominated	
2013	Creative Arts Emmy Award^{1}	Outstanding Achievement in Art Direction/Set Decoration/Scenic Design for a Drama Series	Chip Dox; Andrew Evashchen; Jennifer Elliott	Production Designer; Art Director; Set Decorator	Nominated	
2013	Creative Arts Emmy Award^{1}	Outstanding Achievement in Makeup for a Drama Series	Donna Messina; Angela Ackley; Melinda Osgood; Tamara Papirian; Bobbi Roberts; Caitlin Davison	Head Makeup Artist; Makeup Artist; Makeup Artist; Makeup Artist; Makeup Artist; Makeup Artist	Nominated	
2013	Creative Arts Emmy Award^{1}	Outstanding Casting for a Drama Series	Mark Teschner, CSA	Casting director	Nominated	
2013	Creative Arts Emmy Award^{1}	Outstanding Costume Design for a Drama Series	Mary Iannelli	Costume Designer	Nominated	
2013	Creative Arts Emmy Award^{1}	Outstanding Lighting Direction for a Drama Series	Robert Bessoir; Vincent Steib	Lighting designers	Nominated	
2013	Creative Arts Emmy Award^{1}	Outstanding Original Song for a Drama Series	Just Like That	Rie Sinclair	Nominated	
2013	Creative Arts Emmy Award^{1}	Outstanding Achievement in Live & Direct to Tape Sound Mixing for a Drama Series	Christopher Banninger; Donald Smith; Nicholas Marcus; Paul Glass; Dave Macleod; Alan Zema; Chris Tyson	Production Mixer; Post-Production Mixer; Post-Production Mixer; Music Mixer; Music Mixer; Boom Operator; Boom Operator	Nominated	
2013	Creative Arts Emmy Award^{1}	Outstanding Achievement in Multiple Camera Editing for a Drama Series	Denise Van Cleave; Penny Pengra; Christine Magarian Ucar; Peter Fillmore; David Gonzalez; Christine Cooper	Editors	Nominated	
2013	Creative Arts Emmy Award^{1}	Outstanding Achievement in Music Direction and Composition for a Drama Series	Paul Glass; Dave Macleod; Kurt Biederwolf; Steven E. Hopkins; Jack Urbont; RC Cates	Supervising Music Director, Composer; Music Director; Composer; Composer; Composer; Composer; Composer	Nominated	
2013	Creative Arts Emmy Award^{1}	Outstanding Achievement in Technical Direction/Electronic Camera/Video Control for a Drama Series	Averill Perry; Kevin Carr; DJ Diomedes; Dale Carlson; Craig Camou; Dean Cosanella; Antonio Simone	Technical Director; Technical Director; Camera Operator; Camera Operator; Camera Operator; Camera Operator; Video Control	Nominated	
2013	Creative Arts Emmy Award^{1}	Outstanding Stunt Coordination	Tim Davison	Stunt Coordinator	Nominated	
2013	Writers Guild of America Award	Daytime Serials	Ron Carlivati^{6}; Shelly Altman^{7}; Anna Theresa Cascio; Suzanne Flynn; Kate Hall; Elizabeth Korte; Daniel James O’Connor; Elizabeth Page; Katherine Schock; Scott Sickles; Chris Van Etten	Writing Team	Nominated	
2014	Daytime Emmy Award	Outstanding Lead Actor in a Drama Series	Jason Thompson	Patrick Drake	Nominated	
2014	Daytime Emmy Award	Outstanding Supporting Actress in a Drama Series	Jane Elliot	Tracy Quartermaine	Nominated	
2014	Daytime Emmy Award	Outstanding Supporting Actress in a Drama Series	Kelly Sullivan	Connie Falconeri	Nominated	
2014	Daytime Emmy Award	Outstanding Supporting Actor in a Drama Series	Bradford Anderson	Damian Spinelli	Nominated	
2014	Daytime Emmy Award	Outstanding Supporting Actor in a Drama Series	Dominic Zamprogna	Dante Falconeri	Nominated	
2014	Daytime Emmy Award	Outstanding Younger Actress in a Drama Series	Kristen Alderson	Starr Manning	Nominated	
2014	Daytime Emmy Award	Outstanding Younger Actor in a Drama Series	Bryan Craig	Morgan Corinthos	Nominated	
2014	Daytime Emmy Award	Outstanding Younger Actor in a Drama Series	Chad Duell	Michael Corinthos	Nominated	
2014	Creative Arts Emmy Award^{1}	Outstanding Multiple Camera Editing for a Drama Series	Christine Cooper; Peter Fillmore; David Gonzalez; Christine Magarian Ucar; Denise Van Cleave	Editors	Nominated	
2014	Creative Arts Emmy Award^{1}	Outstanding Technical Team for a Drama Series	Kevin Carr; Averill Perry; Craig Camou; Dale Carlson; Dean Cosanella; DJ Diomedes; Victoria Walker; Antonio Simone	Technical Director; Technical Director; Electronic Camera Operator; Electronic Camera Operator; Electronic Camera Operator; Electronic Camera Operator; Electronic Camera Operator; Senior Video Control	Nominated	
2014	Creative Arts Emmy Award^{1}	Outstanding Promotional Announcement – Institutional	Mark Feldstein; Brad Roth; Hema Mulchandani; Jonas Morganstein; Ashley Rideau; Leeanne Irvin; Stephen Kirklys; Kenneth Lee; Karen Higginbotham; Shevy Smith	Exec. Producer; Exec. Producer; Producer; Creative Director; Creative Director; Creative Director; Art Director; Designer; Production Manager; Composer	Nominated	
2014	Creative Arts Emmy Award^{1}	Outstanding Makeup for a Drama Series	Donna Messina Armogida; Angela Ackley; Caitlin Davison; Melinda Osgood; Tamara Papirian; Bobbi Roberts	Head Makeup Artist; Makeup Artist; Makeup Artist; Makeup Artist; Makeup Artist; Makeup Artist	Won	
2014	Creative Arts Emmy Award^{1}	Lighting Direction for a Drama Series	Robert Bessior; Vincent Steib	Lighting Designers	Nominated	
2014	Creative Arts Emmy Award^{1}	Outstanding Art Direction/Set Decoration/Scenic Design for a Drama Series	Chip Dox; Jennifer Elliott; Andrew Evashchen	Production Designer; Set Decorator; Set Decorator	Nominated	
2014	Creative Arts Emmy Award^{1}	Outstanding Casting Director for a Drama Series	Mark Teschner, CSA	Casting Director	Won	
2014	Creative Arts Emmy Award^{1}	Outstanding Costume Design for a Drama Series	Shawn Reeves	Costume Designer	Nominated	
2014	Writers Guild of America Award	Daytime Serials	Ron Carlivati^{6}; Anna Theresa Cascio; Suzanne Flynn; Kate Hall; Elizabeth Korte; Daniel James O’Connor; Elizabeth Page; Katherine Schock; Scott Sickles; Chris Van Etten	Writing Team	Won	
2015	Daytime Emmy Award	Outstanding Drama Series	Frank Valentini; Jennifer Whittaker-Brogdon; Mercer Barrows; Michelle Henry; Mary Kelly Weir	Exec. Producer; Coordinating Producer; Producer; Producer; Producer	Nominated	
2015	Daytime Emmy Award	Outstanding Drama Series Directing Team	Larry Carpenter; William Ludel; Scott McKinsey; Penny Pengra; Frank Valentini; Phideaux Xavier; Christine Cooper; Peter Fillmore; Paul Glass; Dave MacLeod; Christine Magarian Ucar; Denise Van Cleave; Crystal Craft; Craig McManus; Jillian Dedote; Marika Kushel; Allison Reames	Director; Director; Director; Director; Director; Director; Assoc. Director; Assoc. Director; Assoc. Director; Assoc. Director; Assoc. Director; Stage Manager; Stage Manager; Production Assoc.; Production Assoc.	Nominated	
2015	Daytime Emmy Award	Outstanding Drama Series Writing Team	Ron Carlivati^{6}; Anna Theresa Cascio; Suzanne Flynn; Kate Hall; Elizabeth Korte; Daniel James O’Connor; Elizabeth Page; Katherine Schock; Scott Sickles; Chris Van Etten	Writing Team	Nominated	
2015	Daytime Emmy Award	Outstanding Lead Actor in a Drama Series	Anthony Geary	Luke Spencer	Won	
2015	Daytime Emmy Award	Outstanding Lead Actor in a Drama Series	Jason Thompson	Patrick Drake	Nominated	
2015	Daytime Emmy Award	Outstanding Lead Actress in a Drama Series	Maura West	Ava Jerome	Won	
2015	Daytime Emmy Award	Outstanding Lead Actress in a Drama Series	Laura Wright	Carly Corinthos Jacks	Nominated	
2015	Daytime Emmy Award	Outstanding Supporting Actor in a Drama Series	Chad Duell	Michael Corinthos	Won	
2015	Daytime Emmy Award	Outstanding Younger Actor in a Drama Series	Bryan Craig	Morgan Corinthos	Nominated	
2015	Daytime Emmy Award	Outstanding Younger Actor in a Drama Series	Tequan Richmond	TJ Ashford	Nominated	
2015	Creative Arts Emmy Award^{1}	Outstanding Special Guest Performer in a Drama Series	Donna Mills	Madeline Reeves	Won ^{9}	
2015	Creative Arts Emmy Award^{1}	Outstanding Special Guest Performer in a Drama Series	Linda Elena Tovar	Rosalie Martinez	Nominated	
2015	Creative Arts Emmy Award^{1}	Outstanding Art Direction/Set Decoration/Scenic Design for a Drama Series	Chip Dox; Andrew Evashchen; Jennifer Elliott	Production Designer; Art Director; Set Decorator	Nominated	
2015	Creative Arts Emmy Award^{1}	Outstanding Casting Director for a Drama Series	Mark Teschner, CSA	Casting Director	Won	
2015	Creative Arts Emmy Award^{1}	Outstanding Costume Design for a Drama Series	Shawn Reeves	Costume Designer	Nominated	
2015	Creative Arts Emmy Award^{1}	Outstanding Hairstyling for a Drama Series	Anzhela Adzhiyan; Nicole Moore; Linda Osgood; Lauran Rizzuto	Hairstylists	Nominated	
2015	Creative Arts Emmy Award^{1}	Outstanding Lighting Direction for a Drama Series	Robert Bessoir; Vincent Steib	Lighting Designers	Nominated	
2015	Creative Arts Emmy Award^{1}	Outstanding Multiple Camera Editing for a Drama Series	Peter Fillmore; Christine Cooper; David Gonzalez; Christine Magarian Ucar; Denise Van Cleave	Editors	Nominated	
2015	Creative Arts Emmy Award^{1}	Outstanding Makeup for a Drama Series	Donna Messina; Angela Ackley; Caitlin Davison; Tamar Papirian; Bobbie Roberts	Head Makeup Artist; Makeup Artist; Makeup Artist; Makeup Artist; Makeup Artist	Won	
2015	Creative Arts Emmy Award^{1}	Outstanding Music Direction and Composition for a Drama Series	Paul Glass; Dave MacLeod; Kurt Biederwolf; Steven E. Hopkins; Matt McGuire; Bobby Summerfield	Music Supervisor & Composer; Music Director; Composer; Composer; Composer; Composer	Won	
2015	Creative Arts Emmy Award^{1}	Outstanding Original Song – Drama	Little Things by Nikola Bedingfield and Eve Nelson	Composers & Lyricists	Nominated	
2015	Creative Arts Emmy Award^{1}	Outstanding Original Song – Drama	Reaching by Robert Hartry	Composer & Lyricist	Nominated	
2015	Creative Arts Emmy Award^{1}	Outstanding Live and Direct to Tape Sound Mixing for a Drama Series	Christopher Banninger; Nick Marcus; Donald Smith; Paul Glass; Dave MacLeod; Chris Tyson; Alan Zema	Production Mixer; Post-Production Mixer; Post-Production Mixer; Music Mixer; Music Mixer; Boom Operator; Boom Operator	Nominated	
2015	Creative Arts Emmy Award^{1}	Outstanding Technical Team for a Drama Series	Chuck Abate; Kevin Carr; Craig Camou; Dale Carlson; Dean Cosanella; DJ Diomedes; Barbara Langdon; Antonio Simone	Technical Director; Technical Director; Camera Operator; Camera Operator; Camera Operator; Camera Operator; Camera Operator; Senior Video Control	Nominated	
2016	Daytime Emmy Award	Outstanding Drama Series	Frank Valentini; Jennifer Whittaker-Brogdon; Mercer Barrows; Michelle Henry; Mary Kelly Weir	Exec. Producer; Coor. Producer; Producer; Producer; Producer	Won	
2016	Daytime Emmy Award	Outstanding Drama Series Writing Team	Shelly Altman^{10}; Ron Carlivati^{7}; Jean Passanante^{10}; Anna Theresa Cascio; Daniel James O'Connor; Chris Van Etten; Andrea Archer Compton; Suzanne Flynn; Kate Hall; Elizabeth Korte; Katherine Schock; Scott Sickless	Head Writer; Head Writer; Head Writer; Breakdown Writer; Breakdown Writer; Breakdown Writer; Script Writer; Script Writer; Script Writer; Script Writer; Script Writer; Script Writer	Nominated	
2016	Daytime Emmy Award	Outstanding Drama Series Directing Team	Larry Carpenter; William Ludel; Scott McKinsey; Penny Pengra; Frank Valentini; Phideaux Xavier; Christine Cooper; Peter Fillmore; Paul Glass; Dave MacLeod; Christine Magarian Ucar; Denise Van Cleave; Crystal Craft; Craig McManus; Jillian Dedote; Marika Kushel; Allison Reames	Director; Director; Director; Director; Director; Director; Assoc. Director; Assoc. Director; Assoc. Director; Assoc. Director; Assoc. Director; Stage Manager; Stage Manager; Production Assoc.; Production Assoc.	Nominated	
2016	Daytime Emmy Award	Outstanding Lead Actor in a Drama Series	Tyler Christopher	Nikolas Cassadine	Won	
2016	Daytime Emmy Award	Outstanding Lead Actor in a Drama Series	Anthony Geary	Luke Spencer	Nominated	
2016	Daytime Emmy Award	Outstanding Lead Actress in a Drama Series	Finola Hughes	Anna Devane	Nominated	
2016	Daytime Emmy Award	Outstanding Lead Actress in a Drama Series	Maura West	Ava Jerome	Nominated	
2016	Daytime Emmy Award	Outstanding Supporting Actor in a Drama Series	Sean Blakemore	Shawn Butler	Won	
2016	Daytime Emmy Award	Outstanding Supporting Actor in a Drama Series	Dominic Zamprogna	Dante Falconeri	Nominated	
2016	Daytime Emmy Award	Outstanding Younger Actor in a Drama Series	Bryan Craig	Morgan Corinthos	Won	
2016	Daytime Emmy Award	Outstanding Younger Actor in a Drama Series	Nicolas Bechtel	Spencer Cassadine	Nominated	
2016	Daytime Emmy Award	Outstanding Younger Actor in a Drama Series	Tequan Richmond	TJ Ashford	Nominated	
2016	Daytime Emmy Award	Outstanding Younger Actress in a Drama Series	Brooklyn Rae Silzer	Emma Drake	Nominated	
2016	Daytime Emmy Award	Outstanding Special Guest Performer in a Drama Series	Dee Wallace	Patricia Spencer	Nominated	
2017	Daytime Emmy Award	Outstanding Drama Series	Frank Valentini; Jennifer Whittaker-Brogdon; Mercer Barrows; Michelle Henry; Mary Kelly Weir	Exec. Producer; Coor. Producer; Producer; Producer; Producer	Won	
2017	Daytime Emmy Award	Outstanding Drama Series Writing Team	Shelly Altman ^{10}; Ron Carlivati ^{7}; Jean Passanante ^{10}; Anna Theresa Cascio; Daniel James O'Connor; Chris Van Etten; Andrea Archer Compton; Suzanne Flynn; Kate Hall; Elizabeth Korte; Katherine Schock; Scott Sickless	Head Writer; Head Writer; Head Writer; Breakdown Writer; Breakdown Writer; Breakdown Writer; Script Writer; Script Writer; Script Writer; Script Writer; Script Writer; Script Writer	Nominated	
2017	Daytime Emmy Award	Outstanding Drama Series Directing Team	Larry Carpenter; William Ludel; Scott McKinsey; Penny Pengra; Frank Valentini; Phideaux Xavier; Christine Cooper; Peter Fillmore; Paul Glass; Dave MacLeod; Christine Magarian Ucar; Denise Van Cleave; Crystal Craft; Craig McManus; Jillian Dedote; Marika Kushel; Allison Reames	Director; Director; Director; Director; Director; Director; Assoc. Director; Assoc. Director; Assoc. Director; Assoc. Director; Assoc. Director; Stage Manager; Stage Manager; Production Assoc.; Production Assoc.	Won	
2017	Daytime Emmy Award	Outstanding Lead Actress in a Drama Series	Nancy Lee Grahn	Alexis Davis	Nominated	
2017	Daytime Emmy Award	Outstanding Lead Actress in a Drama Series	Laura Wright	Carly Corinthos	Nominated	
2017	Daytime Emmy Award	Outstanding Supporting Actress in a Drama Series	Finola Hughes	Anna Devane	Nominated	
2017	Daytime Emmy Award	Outstanding Supporting Actor in a Drama Series	Chad Duell	Michael Corinthos	Nominated	
2017	Daytime Emmy Award	Outstanding Supporting Actor in a Drama Series	Jeffrey Vincent Parise	Carlos Rivera/Dr. Joe Rivera	Nominated	
2017	Daytime Emmy Award	Outstanding Younger Actress in a Drama Series	Lexi Ainsworth	Kristina Corinthos Davis	Won	
2017	Daytime Emmy Award	Outstanding Younger Actress in a Drama Series	Chloe Lanier	Nelle Benson	Nominated	
2017	Daytime Emmy Award	Outstanding Younger Actor in a Drama Series	Bryan Craig	Morgan Corinthos	Won	
2017	Daytime Emmy Award	Outstanding Younger Actor in a Drama Series	Tequan Richmond	TJ Ashford	Nominated	
2017	Daytime Emmy Award	Outstanding Special Guest Performer in a Drama Series	Don Harvey	Tom Baker	Nominated	
2018	Daytime Emmy Award	Outstanding Drama Series	Frank Valentini; Jennifer Whittaker-Brogdon; Mercer Barrows; Michelle Henry; Mary Kelly Weir	Exec. Producer; Coor. Producer; Producer; Producer; Producer	Nominated	
2019	Daytime Emmy Award	Outstanding Drama Series	Frank Valentini; Michelle Henry; Mary Kelly Weir; Nneka Garland; Mercer Barrows; Jennifer Whittaker-Brogdon	Exec. Producer; Senior Producer; Senior Producer; Coor. Producer; Producer; Producer	Nominated	

== Note ==
1. The Daytime Emmy Awards present their Creative Arts Emmys at separate Creative Arts ceremonies prior to their respective main ceremonies.
2. Nominated posthumously.
3. Robert Guza, Jr., Head Writer Elizabeth Korte, Associate Head Writer Michele Val Jean, Scriptwriter Susan Wald, Scriptwriter Mary Sue Price Scriptwriter David Goldschmid, Scriptwriter Michael Conforrti, Scriptwriter Garin Wolf, Scriptwriter Karen Harris, Scriptwriter
4. Tied with The Bold and the Beautiful.
5. Co-Head writer with Robert Guza, Jr.: February 2007 – October 2007
6. Head writer: October 2007 – January 3, 2008; March 17, 2008 – July 25, 2011
7. Head writer from February 2012 – October 2015.
8. Associate head writer: August 10, 2011 – January 6, 2012; February 21, 2012 – February 28, 2013.
9. Tied with Fred Willard as John Forrester on The Bold and the Beautiful (CBS) and Ray Wise as Ian Ward on The Young and the Restless (CBS)
10. New Head Writers from October 2015 – present.

== See also ==
- General Hospital
- General Hospital cast members
- List of previous General Hospital cast members
- List of General Hospital characters
