= Labine =

The surname Labine may refer to:

- Claire Labine (1934–2016), U.S. soap opera writer
- Clem Labine (1926–2007), U.S. baseball player
- Eleanor Labine, American TV writer
- Gilbert Labine (1890–1977), Canadian prospector
- Kyle Labine (born 1983), Canadian actor
- Leonard Gerald Labine (1931–2005), Canadian ice hockey player
- Marcel Labine (1948–2026), Canadian poet
- Matthew Labine (1959–2017), American soap opera writer
- Robert Labine (1940–2021), Canadian politician
- Tyler Labine (born 1978), Canadian actor and comedian
