= Juliet Law Packer =

American writer

Juliet Law Packer (born October 14, 1952) is an American television writer. She graduated from Princeton University - 1974 and received a master's degree in film and television from Northwestern University - 1977. She attended New Trier High School - 1970.

== Positions held ==
All My Children

- Breakdown Writer: December 1997 - August 2001, October 21, 2004 - June 30, 2005

General Hospital

- Breakdown Writer: 2001 - 2002

Another World

- Breakdown Writer: 1997

As the World Turns

- Co-Head Writer: March 7, 1993 - January 1995
- Breakdown Writer: 1988 - March 1993

The City

- Breakdown Writer: 1995 - 1997

Days of Our Lives

- Breakdown Writer: 2003

Search for Tomorrow

- Writer: 1982 - 1985

Falcon Crest - multiple episodes

The Waltons - multiple episodes 1977-1981

Palmerstown, USA - multiple episodes, story consultant

== Awards and nominations ==
Daytime Emmy Awards

NOMINATIONS

- (1991, 1993 & 1996; Best Writing; As the World Turns)
- (1999, 2001 & 2002; Best Writing; All My Children)

Writers Guild of America Award

WINS

- (1985 season; Search for Tomorrow)
- (1999, 2001 & 2002 seasons; All My Children)

NOMINATIONS

- (1990 season; As the World Turns)
- (2000 season; All My Children)

Preceded by Douglas Marland	Head Writer of As the World Turns (with Richard Backus: April 26, 1993 – January 13, 1995) (with Garin Wolf and Richard Culliton: January 16-27, 1995); April 26, 1993 – January 27, 1995	Succeeded by Richard Culliton
