= Charles Pratt Jr. =

American television writer, producer and director

- Born: January 6, 1955 (age 71)
- Other names: Charles A. Pratt Jr.; Chuck Pratt
- Occupations: television writer, producer, director

Charles Pratt Jr. (born January 6, 1955) is an American television writer, producer and director.

In September 2014, it was revealed that Pratt had been hired as head writer and co-executive producer of The Young and the Restless. In September 2016, it was confirmed that Pratt was leaving his position at The Young and the Restless to become show-runner and executive producer of the primetime series Star. In 2021, he was hired to be a producer on the Disney Channel Original Mystery Series Secrets of Sulphur Springs. The show premiered in January of that year.

== Daytime soap opera positions held ==
All My Children (hired by Brian Frons)

- Head writer: August 27, 2008 – February 15, 2010
- Co-head writer (with Lorraine Broderick): February 8 – 15, 2010
- Consulting producer: August 20, 2008 – November 2009

General Hospital

- Consulting producer: May 2004 – March 28, 2006
- Head writer (with Robert Guza Jr.): June 13, 2002 – March 10, 2006
- Script Writer: 1982–1984

Santa Barbara

- Script Writer: 1985–1986
- Co-head writer (with Anne Howard Bailey): December 22, 1986 - January 13, 1989
- Head writer: January 16, 1989 – May 18, 1990

Sunset Beach

- Created show with Robert Guza Jr. and Josh Griffith
- Executive Storyline Consultant: 1997

The Young and the Restless (hired by Jill Farren Phelps)

- Head writer: January 16, 2015 – December 6, 2016
- Executive Producer (with Jill Farren Phelps): January 16, 2015 – July 12, 2016; (with Mal Young): July 13, 2016 – December 6, 2016

== Other positions held ==
Beverly Hills, 90210

- Director: January 28, 1998 – "Rebound"

Cruel Intentions 2

- Executive Producer: 2001

Desperate Housewives

- Executive Producer: Pilot
- Consulting Producer: 2004–2006

Gabriel's Fire

- Executive Storyline Consultant: 1991
- Writer: 1990-1991; "Postcards from the Faultline", "Belly of the Beast", “Windows”

The Lying Game

- Executive Producer: 2011–2013
- Developer

Melrose Place

- Writer: July 15, 1992 – May 24, 1999
- Supervising Producer: 1993–1994
- Co-Executive Producer: September 11, 1995 – May 24, 1999
- Director: 1996–1999
- Wrote and directed the last episode

Models Inc.

- Executive Producer: 1994-1995

Pacific Palisades

- Consultant
- Director

The Colbys

- Writer: January 16, 1986 – "The Turning Point"

Titans

- Head writer: 2000
- Executive Producer: 2000

Ugly Betty

- Consulting Producer: 2007–2010

Secrets of a Small Town

- Creator: 2006

The Apostles (directed by David McNally)

- Creator: 2008

Full House

- Writer: "A Pinch for a Pinch" aired on October 26, 1990.

Star

- Executive Producer: 2016–2017

== Awards and nominations ==
Pratt has been nominated for multiple Daytime Emmys. He won the 1991 Emmy for Outstanding Writing Team, with Sheri Anderson, Samuel D. Ratcliffe, Maralyn Thoma, Josh Griffith, Robert Guza Jr., Linda Hammer, Lynda Myles, Frank Salisbury, and Richard Culliton.
