= Munisteri =

Munisteri is a surname. Notable people with the surname include:

- Mary Ryan Munisteri, American television soap opera writer
- Steve Munisteri (born 1957), American politician
