= Meg Bennett =

American screenwriter and actress (1948–2024)

- Bennett in 1985
- Born: Helen Bennett; October 4, 1948
- Died: April 11, 2024 (aged 75); Los Angeles, California, U.S.
- Education: Northwestern University
- Occupations: Writer; actress; model
- Spouse: Robert Guza Jr.

Helen Bennett (October 4, 1948 – April 11, 2024), known professionally as Meg Bennett, was an American television writer, actress, and model. She was married to ex-General Hospital head writer Robert Guza Jr.

== Early life ==
Bennett was the eldest daughter of a printing company executive and a psychologist, and grew up in Pasadena, California. She majored in drama at Northwestern University, was homecoming queen, acted in summer stock during college breaks, and worked as a model, including an appearance in Life magazine. She changed her name to Meg because there was already a Helen Bennett registered with the Screen Actors' Guild.

== Career ==
In 1971 she was hired as the "Cadillac Eldorado convertible girl" for a New York auto show, which prompted her to move to Manhattan. There she appeared on the game show Three on a Match, where she won $10,000 in prizes and was an undefeated champion. She was an original cast member of the Broadway production Grease, which led to her being cast on the daytime soap opera Search for Tomorrow in 1974. She played the role of the good girl Liza for three years, then left New York for California. She also appeared occasionally as a panelist on Match Game.

Bennett suffered a bout of hepatitis, and once recovered, she was cast as Julia Newman on The Young and the Restless in 1980. She played the role on-and-off for six years, during which time she impressed Bill Bell, the creator of the show, with her on-set skills as a script doctor. He asked her to write for the show in 1981, and thereafter she began doing double duty as writer and actress on the show. Her writing duties usurped her acting career, and she shared an Emmy award with the rest of the writing staff for General Hospital in 1995. She still acted occasionally, playing such roles as the villainous Allegra on General Hospital. She was fired in 2011 by Garin Wolf after his promotion to head writer.

=== Positions held ===
The Bold and the Beautiful

- Script Writer: April 1, 1987 – March 22, 1989
- Executive Storyline Consultant: August 6, 2002 – October 29, 2004 (hired by Bradley Bell)

General Hospital

- Breakdown Writer: 1987–1989; 1994–1997 (hired by Claire Labine); 1999 – December 2000; April 3, 2009 – July 22, 2011
- Actress: Allegra Montenegro (August 2005)

General Hospital: Night Shift

- Script Writer: August 9 – October 4, 2007

Generations (hired by Sally Sussman Morina)

- Writer: 1989–1990

Santa Barbara

- Breakdown Writer: 1991–1993
- Actress: Megan Richardson 1989

Sunset Beach

- Associate Head Writer: 1997
- Co-Head Writer: October 1997 – August 1998

The Young and the Restless

- Script Writer: 1981–1987
- Actress: Julia Newman 1980–1984, 1986–1987, 2002, 2018, 2020

== Personal life and death ==
Bennett met her husband Robert Guza Jr. when they were both hired to write for a soap opera. They have collaborated ever since, writing for several soap operas.

In 2003, they bought a Beverly Hills home formerly owned by Boris Karloff, then Gregory Peck, for $2.8 million.

Bennett died from cancer on April 11, 2024, at the age of 75. She was interred at Forest Lawn Memorial Park (Hollywood Hills).

== Awards and nominations ==
Daytime Emmy Award

- Nomination, 2003, Best Writing, Bold and The Beautiful
- Win, 1995, Best Writing, General Hospital
- Nominations, 1995, 1997 and 2000, Best Writing, General Hospital
- Nomination, 1986, Best Writing, The Young And The Restless

Writers Guild of America Award

- Nomination, 1997 season, Sunset Beach
- Wins, 1994, 1995 and 1997 seasons, General Hospital
- Nominations, 1993–1997 seasons, General Hospital
- Wins, 1991 and 1992 seasons, Santa Barbara
