= Karen Harris (writer) =

American screenwriter

Karen Harris is an American television writer for the ABC Daytime serial General Hospital.

== Career ==
During the 2007–2008 Writers Guild of America strike, she chose not to accept Financial Core status.

She wrote television pilots for Spelling Television and Universal Pictures (1979-1987), and worked at Sony Pictures Television, Lorimar Television (1988–1989) and Columbia Pictures (1989–1990; A Peaceable Kingdom). While at Universal, Harris was a Writer-Producer-Supervising Producer-Executive Producer on The Incredible Hulk.

- Simon & Simon
- Shannon
- Knight Rider
- Street Hawk
- The Human Factor
- Alfred Hitchcock Presents
- Scene of the Crime
- Island Sons
- Baby Brokers
- Creator/EP/co-writer pilot: Deadline: Madrid
- Satisfaction Guaranteed–Pilot
- American Beauty–Pilot

Reaction to Wolf's promotion: Karen Harris on her Facebook page: Oh, please. (lol) I have a new lease on life, Jami. But I walked the picket lines with a whole bunch of terrific writers. Garin Wolf quit the WGA so he could scab. This is his reward. I'm sad, because there are others there who are better writers and deserve it more.

== WGA West ==
In September 2008, scribes elected eight new board members to the WGA West. Topping the list of winners were Army Wives writer Katherine Fugate, who received 647 votes. Also elected were John Bowman (629 votes), Howard Michael Gould (619 votes), David A. Goodman (552 votes), Karen Harris (544 votes), Mark Gunn (525 votes), Aaron Mendelsohn (498 votes) and Kathy Kiernan (463 votes). Bowman, Goodman, Gunn, Mendelsohn and Kiernan are incumbents. A total of 1,235 ballots were cast. Indie firm Pacific Election Services counted the votes.

== Life in General ==
Life In General is a web series which debuted on October 28, 2008 on Strike.TV, an internet network created by Hollywood writers during the 2007-2008 Writers Guild of America (WGA) strike. Life In General is a scripted show set behind-the-scenes at the second longest running soap opera on TV. The companion piece is Greenville General, the soap opera on which they all work.

In the first episode entitled "Out of Control", Courtney is missing, Rod is screwing Maddie, Rachel just found out that her husband cheated on her, and Raymond may have suffered a fatal heart attack. And that's just behind the scenes.

== Positions held ==
All My Children (hired by Brian Frons & Megan McTavish)

- Script writer: 2004 – 2005

General Hospital

- Script writer: 1993 – 1996 (hired by Wendy Riche); 2005 – 2011
- Co-head writer: (with Richard Culliton, and later Robert Guza Jr.) 1996

Adventure Inc.

- Supervising producer 2002–2003
- Writer: two episodes

Port Charles

- Head writer: 2000 (with Barbara Bloom)
- Script writer: 2002–2003
- Associate head writer: 2000 – 2001
- Co-head writer: 2000 (with Jonathan Estrin) PhillyMag

Life In General/Greenville General (web series/pilot (Strike.TV)

- Creator/head writer/Producer: 2008

Highlander

- Writer: 1994–1996

Studio 5-B

- Co-executive producer/writer: 1989

Street Hawk

- Writer: 1985

The Incredible Hulk

- Writer/story editor/producer: 1979–1983

Other TV series: Jack London's Tales of the South Seas; Largo Winch

== Awards and nominations ==
Daytime Emmy Awards

- Nominations: (1995–1997, 2008; Best Writing; General Hospital)
- Wins: (1995; Best Writing; General Hospital)

Writers Guild of America Award

- WGA wins: (1995, 1996, 1998; Best Daytime Serial; General Hospital) (shared with writer team)
- WGA nominations: (1995, 1996, 1997, 1998; Best Daytime Serial; General Hospital)

Preceded by Claire Labine; Matthew Labine	Co-head writer of General Hospital (with Robert Guza Jr.: March 4 – August 23, 1996) (with Richard Culliton: August 26 – December 12, 1996); March 4, 1996–December 12, 1996	Succeeded by Richard Culliton
Preceded by Scott Hamner (no HW listed before she joined)	head writer of Port Charles (with Jonathon Estrin: March 2 – April 5, 2000) (with Barbara Bloom: May 22 – November 9, 2000); March 2 – November 9, 2000	Succeeded by James Harmon Brown; Barbara Esensten
