= Paul Avila Mayer =

TV writer and producer (1928–2009)

- Born: May 28, 1928; Los Angeles, California, US
- Died: July 10, 2009 (aged 81)
- Occupations: TV writer and producer
- Years active: 1928–2009

Paul Avila Mayer (May 28, 1928 – July 10, 2009) was an American television writer and producer.

== Personal life ==
Mayer was born May 28, 1928, in Los Angeles, the son of Edwin Justus Mayer and Frances O'Neill. He was married to actress and comedian Sasha Von Scherler, born Alexandra-Xenia Elizabeth Anne Marie Fiesola von Schoeler, who died in 2000 of lung disease, the daughter of a flapper, disciple of David Belasco, and actress, Ruth Hooper (née Dayton) von Schoeler Litscher, and a Prussian baron, Walram-Voystingus Albert Alexander von Schoeler. Paul and Sasha had three daughters together, Rachael, Ruth, and Daisy.

== Positions held ==
- Executive produce on Ryan's Hope (1975–1981)
- Co-head writer on Where the Heart Is (1971–1973), Love of Life (1973–1975), Ryan's Hope (1975–82, 1983), Search for Tomorrow (1985)
- Writer on Where the Heart Is (1970–1971)
- Adaptation on Six Characters in Search of an Author (1976)

== Awards and nominations ==
Mayer was nominated for ten Daytime Emmy Awards in the categories Outstanding Writing for a Drama Series and Outstanding Daytime Drama Series, for his work on Ryan's Hope. He was nominated annually except for 1982, from 1977 to 1984, and won eight times in 1977, 1978, 1979, 1980, 1983, and 1984. His first win was shared with Claire Labine and Mary Ryan Munisteri, and his first nomination was shared with Labine and Robert Costello.

== After Ryan's Hope ==
According to an interview with co-creator Claire Labine, after the show's cancellation in 1989, Mayer went back to school at the age of 56. He earned a Master of Social Work degree and then studied at a psychoanalytic institute, launching a successful career as a psychoanalyst. Mayer died on July 10, 2009, of a brain tumor.

== Career as head writer ==
Preceded by Pat Falken Smith	Where the Heart Is (with Claire Labine) mid 1970 – March 1973	Succeeded by Show Ended
Preceded by Loring Mandel	Love of Life (with Claire Labine); March 1973 – July 1975	Succeeded by Margaret DePriest
Preceded by None	Ryan's Hope (with Claire Labine); July 1975 – February 1982	Succeeded by Mary Ryan Munisteri
Preceded by Mary Ryan Munisteri	Ryan's Hope (with Claire Labine); January 1983 – December 1983	Succeeded by Pat Falken Smith & James E. Reilly
Preceded by Caroline Franz & Jeanne Glynn	Search for Tomorrow (with Stephanie Braxton); March 1985 – October 1985	Succeeded by Gary Tomlin
