= Robert Guza Jr. =

American television producer and writer

- Born: 1954 (age 71–72); United States
- Occupations: Screenwriter; television producer
- Spouse: Meg Bennett (2004-2024) (her death)

Robert Guza Jr. (born in 1954) is an American television writer and producer, who formerly held the position as head writer on the ABC Daytime soap opera General Hospital.

== Personal life ==
Guza was married to actress and fellow writer Meg Bennett from 2004 until her death in 2024.

== Career ==
During the 2007 WGA strike, Garin Wolf assumed head writing duties through March 17, 2008, at which time Guza's post-strike episodes hit the air waves.

== Positions on General Hospital ==
Script writer (hired by Anne Howard Bailey; 1982–1987)

Head writer

- March 4, 1996 – September 13, 1996: with Karen Harris
- December 8, 1997 – February 2, 2001: Solo
- June 13, 2002 – March 10, 2006: with Charles Pratt Jr. (re-hired by Angela Shapiro)
- March 13, 2006 – January 31, 2007: Solo
- February 1, 2007 – October 19, 2007: with Meg Bennett
- October 22, 2007 – January 3, 2008; March 17, 2008 – July 25, 2011

== Other writing credits ==
- General Hospital: Night Shift; July 12, 2007 – October 4, 2007 - Head writer (with Elizabeth Korte)
- Loving - Head writer (with Millee Taggart): 1992
- Melrose Place - Script Writer: 1992 (hired by Darren Star)
- Models Inc. - Script Writer and Story Editor: 1994
- Port Charles - Storyline Consultant: 1998
- Santa Barbara - Breakdown Writer: 1988–1991
- Sunset Beach - Co-Creator (with Charles Pratt Jr. & Josh Griffith) and head writer: January 1997 – October 1997
- Prom Night - co-written with William Gray
- Curtains
- Melanie

== Awards and nominations ==
Guza has been nominated for twenty Daytime Emmy Awards, the first being in 1994. Guza has won three Daytime Emmys for his work as head writer (all for General Hospital), four Emmys for his role as a consulting producer in GH's wins for Outstanding Drama Series, and one as a breakdown writer for Santa Barbara's win of Outstanding Writing Team. Guza was nominated six times for a Writers Guild of America Award (winning once).

As co-writer with Richard Paluck of the 1982 film Melanie, he was named winner of the Genie Award for Best Adapted Screenplay at the 4th Genie Awards in 1983; however, the award was subsequently rescinded after the Academy of Canadian Cinema and Television learned that the short story from which it was adapted had not been previously published, making it ineligible for the award according to the Academy's rules at that time.

== Writing history ==
Preceded by Addie Walsh	Head writer of Loving (with Millee Taggart); January 18, 1993– September 22, 1993	Succeeded by Agnes Nixon
Preceded by Claire Labine and Matthew Labine	Head writer of General Hospital (with Karen Harris); March 4, 1996 – August 23, 1996	Succeeded by Richard Culliton (with K. Harris)
Preceded by none	Head writer of Sunset Beach; January 16, 1997 – October 21, 1997	Succeeded by Meg Bennett
Preceded by Janet Iacobuzio; Christopher Whitesell	Head writer of General Hospital; December 8, 1997 – February 2, 2001	Succeeded by Michele Val Jean; Elizabeth Korte
Preceded by Megan McTavish	Head writer of General Hospital (with Charles Pratt Jr.: June 13, 2002 – March 10, 2006); June 13, 2002 – January 3, 2008	Succeeded by Garin Wolf
Preceded by None	Head writer of General Hospital: Night Shift (with Elizabeth Korte); July 12, 2007 – October 4, 2007	Succeeded by Sri Rao
Preceded by Garin Wolf	Head writer of General Hospital; March 17, 2008 – July 25, 2011	Succeeded by Garin Wolf; Shelly Altman
Preceded by Michele Val Jean	Head writer of Beyond the Gates (with Michele Val Jean); March 3, 2025 – October 14, 2025	Succeeded by Michele Val Jean; Tracey Thomson

== See also ==
- List of General Hospital crew
