= Richard Culliton =

American screenwriter

Richard Culliton is an American television writer known for his work on soap operas. He has won four Writers Guild of America Awards, including one as a head writer, and three Daytime Emmy Awards. He is an alumnus of Northwestern University. His wife, Carolyn Culliton, is also a veteran writer for soap operas.

== Early career ==
Culliton began his television career in the early 1980s writing for NBC Daytime's Texas, and then serving as co-head writer for CBS Daytime's Guiding Light from 1983–1984.

After this, he served as head writer of Another World from 1984–1985. The characters of Wallingford and Marley Hudson were created during his tenure. He wrote for Search for Tomorrow under Addie Walsh in 1986. In the late 1980s, Culliton returned to the writing staff of Guiding Light. He was part of the team that won a Daytime Emmy Award in 1990.

Culliton then joined the writing staff of Santa Barbara; he was a script writer and story editor when the writing team won a Daytime Emmy Award in 1991. After this, he joined ABC Daytime's All My Children from 1991–1993 under the leadership of Megan McTavish and Felicia Minei Behr.

== Mid to late 1990s ==
He served as head writer of As the World Turns in 1995, and received a Daytime Emmy nomination. A major storyline of his at that show was a medical malpractice storyline wherein Lisa Grimaldi blamed Dr. John Dixon for her husband Eduardo Grimaldi's death. The storyline received considerable critical acclaim.

He moved on as head writer of General Hospital from September 1996 to May 1997. He received a Daytime Emmy nomination for his time on GH. At the behest of ABC Daytime, he created the General Hospital spin-off Port Charles along with his wife Carolyn, and served as head writer with her for the first few months of the show's run.

Culliton returned to Another World as head writer from December 1997 to May 1998. From May 1998 to July 1998, he served as co-head writer with Jean Passanante on AW. This was a period of turmoil for the show, with the NBC network demanding significant cast firings. However, Culliton still successfully returned longtime character Cass Winthrop to the frontburner, and brought back the character Marley Love. Culliton stayed with the show as a breakdown writer until its cancellation in June 1999.

Culliton then joined the writing staff of Sunset Beach. After taking a short break, he briefly joined the writing team of Days of Our Lives as a script writer.

== 2000 and beyond ==
In September 2001, Culliton returned to All My Children, replacing Jean Passanante as head writer. After a drug pushing storyline (which was actually started by Passanante) dragged on too long, some fans became frustrated at the show's slow pace. His more popular decisions were creating characters Frankie Stone (in 2001) and Maggie Stone (in January 2002) and bringing back character Kendall Hart (originated by Sarah Michelle Gellar, and currently portrayed by Alicia Minshew) in January 2002. Culliton was fired in December 2002. Despite this, he was nominated for Daytime Emmy Award in 2002 and 2003.

In 2006, Culliton rejoined the writing staff of As the World Turns as a dialogue writer. He was recently fired from ATWT. He has since joined the writing team of Days of Our Lives as a dialogue writer. In 2012, he won a Daytime Emmy Award as part of the Days of Our Lives writing team, for work in 2011.

== Writers Guild awards ==
Culliton won the Writers Guild of America Award for Daytime Serials in 1998 for General Hospital, where he served as head writer the previous year. Previously, he had also won this award in 1992 as part of the writing staff when Santa Barbara won. In 2007, he won the award again, as part of the writing staff of As the World Turns the previous year; indeed, he didn't just happen to be on the staff, but had been the credited script writer for one of the three scripts submitted by As the World Turns to be judged for the award. He also won for As the World Turns in 2009 when he was nominated as part of the writing staff the previous year.

He was also nominated for this award in 1989 as part of the writing staff of Guiding Light the previous year, in 1994 as part of the writing staff of All My Children the previous year, and in 2002 as part of the writing staff of Days of Our Lives the previous year.

== Acting ==
Culliton played a salesman in a Chicago-area theater production of Glengarry Glen Ross in 2009.

== Positions held ==
All My Children

- Head writer: September 6, 2001 – December 10, 2002
- Breakdown Writer: 1991–1993 (hired by Wisner Washam)

Another World

- Head writer: March 1984 – June 1984, December 1997 – May 1998
- co-head writer: July 1984 – January 1985, May 1998 – July 1998
- Breakdown Writer: 1985, July 1998 – June 25, 1999
- Script Writer: 1986

As the World Turns

- Script Writer: August 11, 2006 – January 24, 2008, April 18, 2008 – July 22, 2008
- Head writer: Winter 1995–1996

Days of Our Lives

- Script Writer: 2001, October 2008 – March 2018, 2019–November 2, 2023

General Hospital

- Writer: Summer 1996
- Head writer: October 1996 – May 1997

Guiding Light

- Script Writer: 1987–1990
- co-head writer: 1983–1984

Port Charles

- head writer: June 1, 1997 – December 1997

Santa Barbara

- Script Editor: 1990–1991
- Script Writer: 1990–1991

Search for Tomorrow

- Writer: 1986

Sunset Beach (hired by Meg Bennett)

- Script Writer: 1999

Texas

- Script Writer: 1980-1982

== Awards and nominations ==
Daytime Emmy Awards

WINS

- (1990; Best Writing; Guiding Light)
- (1991; Best Writing; Santa Barbara)
- (2012; Best Writing; Days of Our Lives)

NOMINATIONS

- (1985; Best Writing; Another World)
- (1989; Best Writing; Guiding Light)
- (1992, 1993, 2002 & 2003; Best Writing; All My Children)
- (1996; Best Writing; As the World Turns)
- (1998; Best Writing; General Hospital)
- (2011 & 2014; Best Writing; Days of Our Lives)

Writers Guild of America Award

WINS

- (1992 season; Santa Barbara)
- (1998 season; General Hospital)
- (2007 & 2009 seasons; As the World Turns)
- (2014 season; Days of Our Lives)

NOMINATIONS

- (1989 season; Guiding Light)
- (1994 season; All My Children)
- (2002, 2013 & 2015 seasons; Days of Our Lives)
- (2008 season; As the World Turns)

== HW history ==
Preceded by L. Virginia Browne; Gene Palumbo	co-head writer of Guiding Light (with Carolyn Culliton and Gary Tomlin: March 21 – April 29, 1983) (with Pam Long: May 2 – November 18, 1983); March 21 – November 18, 1983	Succeeded by Pam Long
Preceded by Dorothy Ann Purser	head writer of Another World (from July 2, 1984 with Gary Tomlin); March 1, 1984 – January 4, 1985	Succeeded by Gary Tomlin
Preceded by Juliet Law Packer & Richard Backus	head writer of As the World Turns (with J.L. Packer & Garin Wolf: January 16–27, 1995); January 16, 1995 – January 31, 1996	Succeeded by Henry Stern & Stephen Black
Preceded by Robert Guza Jr. & Karen Harris	head writer of General Hospital (with K. Harris: August 26 – December 12, 1996); August 26, 1996 – June 6, 1997	Succeeded by Janet Iacobuzio & Christopher Whitesell
Preceded by none	head writer of Port Charles (with Carolyn Culliton); June 1 – October 13, 1997	Succeeded by Lynn Marie Latham
Preceded by Michael Malone	head writer of Another World (from May 18, 1998 with Jean Passanante); December 29, 1997 – July 10, 1998	Succeeded by J. Passanante; Leah Laiman
Preceded by Jean Passanante	head writer of All My Children; September 6, 2001 – December 10, 2002	Succeeded by Gordon Rayfield
