= Steve Hopkins (composer) =

American composer

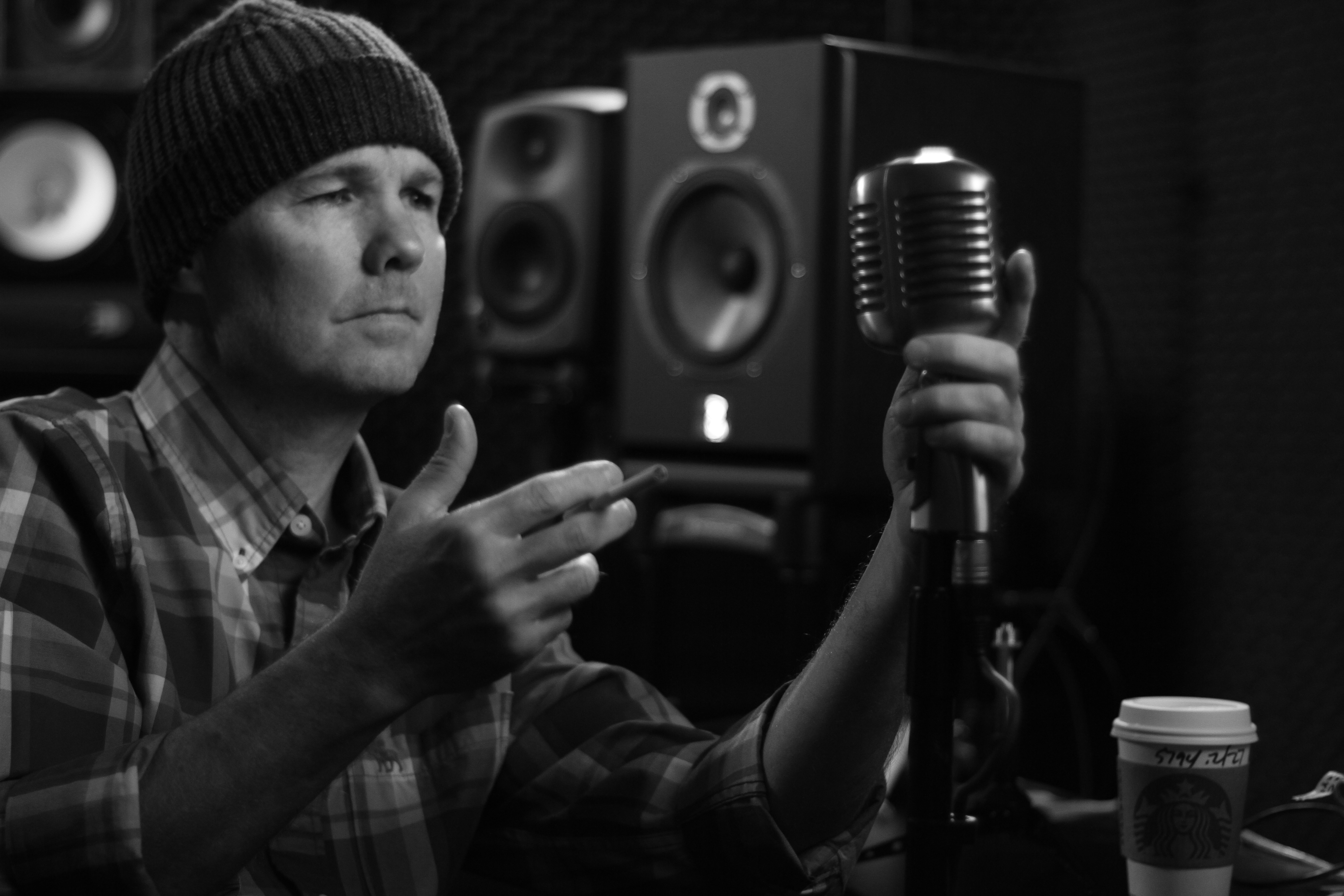
Steve Hopkins (Composer)

Steve Hopkins, also known as Steven E. Hopkins and HipHopkins, is a music composer, producer and musician based in Los Angeles, California, United States. He is best known as co-writer of the theme music for the longest running daytime drama in history, General Hospital (ABC / Disney).

== Awards and nominations ==
Year	Award	Category	Nominated work	Result
2019	Daytime Emmy	Outstanding Music Direction and Composition for a Drama Series	General Hospital	Nominated
2018	Daytime Emmy	Outstanding Music Direction and Composition for a Drama Series	General Hospital	Nominated
2017	Daytime Emmy	Outstanding Music Direction and Composition for a Drama Series	General Hospital	Nominated
2016	Daytime Emmy	Outstanding Music Direction and Composition for a Drama Series	General Hospital	Nominated
2015	Daytime Emmy	Outstanding Music Direction and Composition for a Drama Series	General Hospital	Nominated
2013	Daytime Emmy	Outstanding Music Direction and Composition for a Drama Series	General Hospital	Nominated
2008	Daytime Emmy	Outstanding Original Song	One Life to Live	Nominated

== Early life ==
Steve Hopkins was born in New York State to a scientist father and professor mother. He started off playing drums professionally at the age of 16 in the casino showrooms of Atlantic City New Jersey, where he had to be escorted to & from the stage by security guards because he was too young to be in a casino. He eventually ended up touring extensively (as a musician) with Chuck Berry, Tennessee Ernie Ford, Florence Henderson, and Gloria Loring, before re-locating to California and re-inventing himself as a composer & producer.
