= Dorothy Ann Purser =

American screenwriter

- Born: Hammond, Louisiana
- Writing career
- Notable works: Days of Our Lives, Guiding Light

Dorothy Ann Purser is a screenwriter who was born in Hammond, Louisiana. Purser is best known for her work on the television series Days of Our Lives as the head writer and co-writer, and on the television series Guiding Light as head writer. She has been nominated for seven awards, and has received two including a Daytime Emmy.

== Works ==
Purser wrote episodes for the television series Guiding Light. She served as both the head writer and co-writer for the television series Days of Our Lives during the 1990s, receiving several Daytime Emmy nominations and two awards for episodes she wrote. She also wrote for the series One Life to Live.

== Awards and recognition ==
As a television writer, Purser won two major awards and was nominated for seven others. The first of her two major awards came in the form of a 1993 Daytime Emmy for "Outstanding Drama Series Writing Team" for a 1992 episode of The Guiding Light. Purser also received a 2000 WGA Award in the category of "Daytime Serials" for a 1999 episode of Days of our Lives, which she helped to write. She was unsuccessfully nominated for six Daytime Emmys for "Outstanding Drama Series Writing Team": a 1990 nomination of a 1968 episode of One Life to Live, a 1992 nomination for an episode of The Guiding Light, and nominations in the years 1994, 1997, 1998, and 1999 Days of our Lives episodes from the 1965 season. Purser was also nominated for the 2002 WGA Award for a 1965 episode of Days of our Lives.

=== Awards and nominations ===
Daytime Emmy Awards

WINS

- (1993; Best Writing; Guiding Light)

NOMINATIONS

- (1990; Best Writing; One Life to Live)
- (1992; Best Writing; Guiding Light)
- (1994, 1997, 1998 & 1999; Best Writing; Days of Our Lives)

Writers Guild of America Award

WINS

- (1987 season; Ryan's Hope)
- (2000 season; Days of Our Lives)

NOMINATIONS

- (1994 & 2002 seasons; Days of Our Lives)

== Positions held ==
Another World

- Head writer: 1983 - June 1984
- Co-head writer: 1983 (with Robert Soderberg)
- Story Consultant: 1982
- Writer: 1979 - 1980

Days of Our Lives

- Writer: 1960s, 1988–1991, 1994–2001

Guiding Light

- Writer: 1992 - 1994

One Life to Live

- Writer: 1968

The Doctors

- Writer: 1980 - 1982

Ryan's Hope

- Writer: 1985 - 1987

As the World Turns

- Writer: 1970's

== Head writing tenure ==
Preceded by Corinne Jacker	Head writer of Another World (with Robert Soderberg: November 1982 – December 1983); November 1982 – February 1984	Succeeded by Richard Culliton
