= Richard Backus =

American actor and television writer

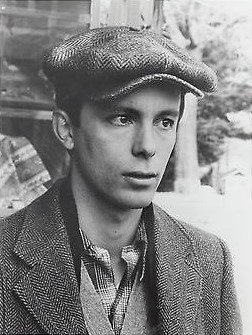
- Richard Backus in a publicity photo for Soldier's Home, 1977
- Born: March 28, 1945 (age 81); Goffstown, New Hampshire, U.S.
- Occupations: Actor, writer
- Spouse: Sharon Romeyko (m. 1985)

Richard Backus (born March 28, 1945) is an American actor and television writer. He has been nominated for four Daytime Emmy Awards for writing and one for acting.

== Biography ==
Richard Backus was born in Goffstown, New Hampshire on March 28, 1945. He attended Harvard University. He has been married to Sharon Romeyko since January 27, 1985.

== Acting career ==
Richard Backus made his Broadway theatre debut at the Booth Theatre in the original production of Butterflies Are Free. The production began in October 1969 with Backus cast as the understudy for Keir Dullea in the role of Don Baker. He first appeared in the role, which he would later take over, in 1971.

Since then, he has appeared in several other Broadway productions, including Ah, Wilderness!, Camelot, and most recently You Never Can Tell. Other venues at which Backus has appeared include the American Shakespeare Theatre, the Ensemble Studio Theatre, and the Brooklyn Academy of Music.

Backus has also acted in film and television. In the seventies, Backus was in Deathdream and portrayed scheming but well-meaning Jason Saxton on Lovers and Friends. He later replaced Eric Roberts in the role of Ted Bancroft on Another World. From 1980 through 1981, he portrayed Barry Ryan on the soap opera Ryan's Hope, a performance for which he was nominated for the 1981 Daytime Emmy Award for Outstanding Actor in a Supporting Role in a Daytime Drama Series.

== Writing career ==
Richard Backus has been a screenwriter since as early as 1989. He has worked on three television shows: As the World Turns, One Life to Live, and Days of Our Lives. As the World Turns and One Life to Live have each earned Backus two nominations for the Daytime Emmy Award for Outstanding Drama Series Writing Team. The writing team behind One Life to Live was also nominated for the 2004 Writers Guild of America Award for Daytime Serials.

== Partial filmography ==
- Deathdream (1974) - 'Andy' / Andy Brooks
- The First Deadly Sin (1980) - Walt Ashman

Preceded by Douglas Marland	Head Writer of As the World Turns (with Juliet Law Packer); April 26, 1993 – January 13, 1995	Succeeded by Juliet Law Packer; Garin Wolf; Richard Culliton
