= Mary Ryan Munisteri =

American television soap opera writer (1939–2022)

Mary Ryan Munisteri was an American television soap opera writer. She was head writer of Ryan's Hope (1982–83), Guiding Light (1986), and Loving (1991). She wrote Mandy's Grandmother, a children special, which aired in 1981. She has three children, Matt Munisteri (musician), Ben Munisteri (choreographer), and Adele Munisteri (yoga teacher). She died on January 29, 2022.

== Positions held ==
Guiding Light

- Head writer: 1986

Loving

- Head writer: 1991-1992

Ryan's Hope

- Head writer: 1982 - 1983
- Associate head writer: 1975 - 1982, 1983–1984

== Awards and nominations ==
Daytime Emmy Awards

Wins

- (1977, 1978, 1979, 1980, 1983 & 1984; Best Writing; Ryan's Hope)
- (1981; Best Writing; Mandy's Grandmother)

Writers Guild of America Award

Wins

- (1976, 1977, 1978, 1979, 1981, 1982, 1983 & 1984 seasons; Ryan's Hope)

Nominations

- (1980 season; Ryan's Hope)

== Head Writer Tenure ==
Preceded by Claire Labine	Ryan's Hope; August 2, 1982 – January 7, 1983	Succeeded by Claire Labine & Paul Avila Mayer
Preceded by Jeff Ryder	Guiding Light (with Jeff Ryder: May 5 – July 18, 1986) (with Ellen Barrett: July 21 – October 1, 1986); May 5 – October 2, 1986	Succeeded by Joseph D. Manetta
Preceded by Millee Taggart; Tom King	Loving; August 5, 1991 – January 9, 1992	Succeeded by Addie Walsh
