= Garin Wolf =

American dramatist

Garin Wolf is an American television writer and playwright. Wolf, formerly a member of Writers Guild of America West, left and maintained financial core status during the 2007–08 Writers Guild of America strike.

== Career ==
=== Television ===
As the World Turns

- Associate head writer: 1985 - 1988 (hired by Douglas Marland), 1993–1995, 1995–1996
- Co-head writer: January 16-27, 1995 (with Juliet Law Packer and Richard Culliton)

Batman: The Animated Series

- Writer: 1992

General Hospital

- Script writer: April 8, 2008 - July 21, 2011
- Associate head writer: 1997 - January 3, 2008, March 17, 2008 – July 25, 2011
- Breakdown writer: 1997–July 22, 2011; February 21, 2012-August 2, 2012 (hired by Karen Harris)
- Head writer: January 4, 2008 - March 14, 2008; July 26, 2011 – February 20, 2012
- Script editor: January 4, 2008 - March 14, 2008 (replaced Elizabeth Korte)

General Hospital: Night Shift (hired by Robert Guza Jr.)

- Script writer July 12, 2007 - October 4, 2007

Tiny Toon Adventures

- Writer (with Charlie Adler)

=== Plays ===
- There Used to Be Fireflies (Off-Broadway/Off Off Broadway)

Preceded by Juliet Law Packer; Richard Backus	Co-head writer of As the World Turns (with Juliet Law Packer and Richard Culliton); January 16–27, 1995	Succeeded by Richard Culliton
Preceded by Robert Guza Jr.	Head writer of General Hospital; January 4, 2008 - March 17, 2008	Succeeded by Robert Guza Jr.
Preceded by Robert Guza Jr.	Head writer of General Hospital (with Shelly Altman: January 9, 2012 - February 20, 2012); July 26, 2011 - February 20, 2012	Succeeded by Ron Carlivati

== Awards and nominations ==
Daytime Emmy Awards

- NOMINATIONS: (1997, 1998, 1999, 2000, 2003, 2004, 2005, 2008; Outstanding Drama Series Writing Team; General Hospital); (1986, 1989, 1996; Outstanding Drama Series Writing Team; As The World Turns)
- WINS: (1999, 2003, 2009; Outstanding Drama Series Writing Team; General Hospital)
- His first nomination was shared with Douglas Marland, Susan Bedsow Horgan, Jeannie Glynn, Patti Dizenzo, M.B. Hatch, Caroline Franz, Chris Auer, Meredith Post, Jane Willis, Steve Wasserman, Emily Squires, Courtney Sherman, Charles Dizenzo, Jessica Klein

Writers Guild of America Award

- NOMINATION: (1998 season; General Hospital)
- WIN: (1997 season; General Hospital)
