= Matthew Labine =

American soap opera writer

Matthew Labine (May 5, 1959 – September 1, 2017) was an American soap opera writer, the son of Claire Labine and the brother of Eleanor Labine Mancusi.

== Early life ==
Labine received a Bachelor of Arts in economics from Yale University in 1981 and was on the rowing team, where he won several rowing championships. After college, played on two US National teams and was a finalist in the US Olympic trials in 1980 and 1984.

== Career ==
Labine and his mother created Heart & Soul, a planned General Hospital spinoff. However, ABC Daytime passed on the show for a more cost-effective show.

=== Writing ===
General Hospital

- Associate Head Writer: 1993–1996

Guiding Light

- Associate Head Writer: August 2000 – July 2001

One Life to Live

- Co-Head Writer: January 1997 – March 1998

Ryan's Hope

- Associate Head Writer: 1988 – January 13, 1989

=== Rowing ===
Labine was a rowing coach at Fairfield University from 2010.

== Awards and nominations ==
Daytime Emmy Awards

WINS

- (1995; Best Writing; General Hospital)

Writers Guild of America Award

WINS

- (1989 & 1990 seasons; Ryan's Hope)
- (1995 & 1996 seasons; General Hospital)

NOMINATIONS

- (2002 season; Guiding Light)
