= Claire Labine =

American television producer and writer (1934–2016)

- Born: Claire Vaughan Wood; June 28, 1934; Jacksonville, Florida, U.S.
- Died: November 11, 2016 (aged 82); Somers, Connecticut, U.S.
- Education: University of Kentucky (BA); Columbia University (MFA)
- Occupations: Screenwriter, producer
- Years active: 1971–2001
- Spouse: Roland Labine (divorced)
- Children: 3, Matthew, Eleanor and John

Claire Vaughn Labine (née Wood; June 28, 1934 – November 11, 2016) was an American soap opera writer and producer.

== Career ==
=== 1960s ===
Labine's first television writing job was for Captain Kangaroo in 1967, she was fired in 1970.

=== 1970s ===
1971 saw her first real foray into daytime television securing the head writing position on Where The Heart Is with her future writing partner of nearly 25 years Paul Avila Mayer. That job lasted until the show's cancellation in 1973.

1973-1975 was spent writing for Love of Life which got the attention of ABC.

In 1975 she began what was to become her best known and acclaimed work creating and head writing Ryan's Hope for ABC. She sold the show to ABC after skyrocketing costs, and was soon fired, rehired, fired then rehired again in 1987 until the shows final demise in 1989.

=== 1990s ===
In 1993, Labine returned to daytime as head writer of ABC's General Hospital. She brought the show much critical acclaim, and won her seventh Daytime Emmy for Outstanding Writing for her work on the show. She chose to depart the show in early 1996. During this time, she created a proposed General Hospital spin-off, Heart and Soul, about two families, one black, one white, both show business families. The black family was three generations of jazz musicians. Next door was a theatrical family. The show was not picked up by ABC or NBC; Wendy Riche's competing Port Charles was ABC's choice instead.

Labine co-wrote, with Judith Pinsker, the 1995 New York Times bestseller General Hospital tie-in novel Robin's Diary, based in the AIDS storyline between characters Stone Cates and Robin Scorpio.

In 1996, Labine was offered the head writer role at As the World Turns but turned it down because she and her son Matthew Labine were trying to get HEART & SOUL [aka Union Place] on the air. "I had to turn it down because we were in the middle of that development. I said to Procter & Gamble, 'I am gratified by this offer, but if I have any chance at all...' I didn't think there was much chance but I thought it was worth a go to do our own show. And they were very lovely about it."

In late 1996, she was made head writer of ABC's One Life to Live because she had a year and a half left on her contract with ABC. She remained with the show until early 1998.

=== 2000s ===
Most recently, Labine had a short stint at CBS' Guiding Light. She was head writer of the show from 2000 through 2001. Labine shared the reins of GL with her children, Matthew Labine and Eleanor Labine. Rumors abounded throughout Labine's tenure at GL that she, executive producer Paul Rauch, and executive in charge of production Mary Alice Dwyer-Dobbin had frequent arguments about the show's direction.

At one point, it was announced in the soap press that the Labines were departing, only to have the announcement recanted a week later. P&G did eventually replace the Labines the following year with writers Lloyd Gold and Christopher Dunn.

In November 2009, Labine gave WeLoveSoaps.net an exclusive interview during which she discussed her struggles with ABC during Ryan's Hope, her enjoyment of writing General Hospital, and her less enjoyable experiences on One Life to Live and Guiding Light. She discussed details about her aborted project, Union Place, and insights into her illustrious career.

== Death ==
Labine died on November 11, 2016, at her home in Somers, Connecticut, at the age of 82. No cause of death was disclosed.

== Positions held ==
Captain Kangaroo

- Script writer: 1966–1967

Where the Heart Is

- Co-head writer: 1971–1973
- Script writer: 1970–1971

Love of Life

- Co-head writer 1973–1975

Ryan's Hope

- Co-Creator
- Executive Producer: July 1975 – June 1982
- Head writer: July 1975 – June 1982, January 1983 – November 1983, February 1987 – January 1989

General Hospital

- Head writer: October 11, 1993 – March 1, 1996

One Life to Live

- Head writer: December 1996 – April 1998

Another World

- Head writer: (with Jean Passanante) June 1998-October 1998

Guiding Light

- Head writer: August 2000 – July 2001

== Awards ==
=== Daytime Emmy ===
9 Wins

- (1995; Outstanding Writing; General Hospital)
- (1977, 1978, 1979, 1980, 1983 & 1984, Outstanding Writing, Ryan's Hope)
- (1977, 1979 Outstanding Drama Series, Ryan's Hope)

12 nominations

- (1978, 1981 & 1982, Outstanding Drama Series, Ryan's Hope)

National Academy Of New York Arts And Sciences Silver Circle Recipient

- 2000

=== Writers Guild of America ===
Wins

- 1995, General Hospital
- 1994, General Hospital
- 1980-1983, 1986–1989, Ryan's Hope

Nominations

- 2001, Guiding Light
- 1996, General Hospital
- 1979, Ryan's Hope

=== Other ===
- 2000 Honored by New York's Silver Circle.
- Honored with Evelyn F. Burkey Award by the Writers Guild of America on February 19, 2005. The award was presented to her by friend and former Ryan's Hope star Kate Mulgrew.
- Connecticut College Gold Medal 1995 Inherit The Earth Award for General Hospital story line on environmental racism, a ground-breaking plot for daytime about a trash incinerator about to be located in a low income area featured icon Laura Webber in fight for social justice .
- Labine served the Writers Guild of America, East, as vice president for three terms, and is a recipient of the Richard Jablow Award for devoted service to the Guild.
- She has been given Lifetime Achievement Awards by the New York Chapter of National Academy of Television Arts & Sciences and Soap Opera Digest.

== Headwriter tenure ==
Preceded by Pat Falken Smith	Where the Heart Is (with Paul Avila Mayer) mid 1970 – March 1973	Succeeded by Show Ended
Preceded by Loring Mandel	Love of Life (with Paul Avila Mayer); September 17, 1973 – May 30, 1975	Succeeded by Margaret DePriest
Preceded by None	Ryan's Hope (with Paul Avila Mayer: July 7, 1975 – March 12, 1982); July 7, 1975 – July 30, 1982	Succeeded by Mary Ryan Munisteri
Preceded by Mary Ryan Munisteri	Ryan's Hope (with Paul Avila Mayer); January 10 – November 18, 1983	Succeeded by Pat Falken Smith & James E. Reilly
Preceded by Tom King & Millee Taggart	Ryan's Hope (with Matthew Labine & Eleanor Labine); February 2, 1987 – January 13, 1989	Succeeded by Show Ended
Preceded by Bill Levinson	General Hospital (with Matthew Labine: November 3, 1995 – March 1, 1996); October 11, 1993 – March 1, 1996	Succeeded by Robert Guza Jr. Karen Harris
Preceded by Peggy Sloane; Jean Passanante	One Life to Live (with Matthew Labine); June 30, 1997 – March 27, 1998	Succeeded by Pam Long
Preceded by James Harmon Brown and Barbara Esensten	Guiding Light; August 7, 2000 – July 13, 2001	Succeeded by Lloyd Gold
