= General Hospital =

American television soap opera (since 1963)

- Also known as: GH
- Genre: Soap opera
- Created by: Frank & Doris Hursley
- Written by: Elizabeth Korte and; Chris Van Etten
- Directed by: See below
- Starring: Present cast; Past cast
- Theme music composer: Jack Urbont; Paul Glass; Steve Hopkins
- Country of origin: United States
- Original language: English
- No. of episodes: 16,000

Production
- Executive producers: Frank Valentini (2012–present); (and others)
- Producer: See below
- Production locations: The Prospect Studios; Los Angeles, California
- Camera setup: Multi-camera
- Running time: 30 minutes (1963–1976); 45 minutes (1976–1978); 60 minutes (1978–present)
- Production companies: Selmur Productions (1963–1968); American Broadcasting Companies, Inc. (since 1968)

Original release
- Network: ABC
- Release: April 1, 1963 – present

Related
- General Hospital: Night Shift; Port Charles; The Young Marrieds; All My Children; The City; Loving; One Life to Live; Ryan's Hope; What If...

General Hospital (often abbreviated as GH) is an American daytime television soap opera created by Frank and Doris Hursley which has been broadcast on ABC since April 1, 1963. Originally a half-hour serial, its running time was expanded from 30 minutes to 45 minutes on July 26, 1976, and again to a full hour on January 16, 1978.

Set in a hospital in the city of Port Charles, New York, (Note: The city of Port Charles was not named until the 1970s.) General Hospital originally starred John Beradino and Emily McLaughlin; both actors stayed with the show until their deaths in 1996 and 1991, respectively. They were joined a year later by Rachel Ames who made her most recent appearance in 2015. The show is taped at the Prospect Studios in Los Angeles, California. General Hospital was the second soap to air on ABC after the short-lived Road to Reality (1960–1961). In 1964, a sister soap was created for General Hospital, The Young Marrieds; it ran for two years and was canceled because of low ratings. General Hospital also spawned the daytime series Port Charles (1997–2003) and the primetime spin-off General Hospital: Night Shift (2007–2008).

In the late 1970s, storylines began to shift focus around the Spencer and Quartermaine families. From 1979 to 1988, General Hospital had more viewers than any other daytime soap opera. It rose to the top of the ratings in the early 1980s in part thanks to the monumentally popular "supercouple" Luke and Laura, whose 1981 wedding brought in 30 million viewers and remains the highest-rated hour in American soap opera history. The soap opera is also known for its high-profile celebrity guest stars who have included, among others, Roseanne Barr, James Franco and Elizabeth Taylor. On April 23, 2009, General Hospital began broadcasting in high-definition television, making it the first ABC soap opera to make such a transition.

General Hospital is listed in Guinness World Records as the longest-running American soap opera in production, and the second in American history after Guiding Light. Concurrently, it is the world's third-longest-running scripted drama series in production after British serials The Archers and Coronation Street, as well as the world's second-longest-running televised soap opera still in production. It is also the longest-running serial produced in Hollywood, and the longest-running entertainment program in ABC television history. General Hospital became the oldest ongoing American soap opera on September 17, 2010, following the final broadcast of CBS' As the World Turns. On April 14, 2011, ABC announced the cancellation of both All My Children and One Life to Live, leaving General Hospital as the last remaining soap opera airing on the network after January 13, 2012. The show celebrated its 50th anniversary on April 1, 2013, and its 16,000th episode on July 13, 2026. It holds the record for most Daytime Emmy Awards for Daytime Emmy Award for Outstanding Drama Series, with 14 wins. In 2007, the show was listed as one of Time magazine's "100 Best TV Shows of All-Time".

== Show history ==
=== Origins ===
General Hospital was created by Frank and Doris Hursley and premiered on April 1, 1963, replacing the canceled game show Yours for a Song. The first stories were mainly set on the seventh floor of General Hospital, in an unnamed midsize Eastern city (the name of the city, Port Charles, would not be mentioned until the late 1970s by headwriters Eileen and Robert Mason Pollock.). "They had this concept of the show that it was like a big wagon wheel—the spokes would be the characters and the hub would be the hospital", John Beradino (Steve Hardy) later reflected to Entertainment Weekly in 1994.

=== History ===
Launched in 1963, the first stories were mainly set at General Hospital in an unnamed midsized Eastern city. Storylines revolved around Steve Hardy (John Beradino) and his friend, Nurse Jessie Brewer (Emily McLaughlin). Jessie's turbulent marriage to the much-younger Phil Brewer (originally portrayed by Roy Thinnes; lastly by Martin West) was the center of many early storylines. In 1964 Audrey Hardy (Rachel Ames), a flight attendant and sister of Nurse Lucille (Lucille Wall), came to town, and was the woman who won Steve's heart.

By the end of the 1970s, General Hospital was facing dire ratings when executive producer Gloria Monty was brought in to turn the show around. Monty is credited with creation of the first supercouple, Luke and Laura, played by Anthony Geary and Genie Francis. The end of their hour wedding on November 17, 1981, was the most-watched event in daytime serial history. During the 1980s, the series featured several high-profile action, adventure, and some science fiction-based storylines. Location shooting at sites including Mount Rushmore in South Dakota; Niagara Falls; Grand Ole Opry in Nashville, Tennessee; Atlantic City, New Jersey; Big Bear and Avalon (Catalina Island), California; and San Antonio, Texas are some that propelled the story.

After Gloria Monty first left the series in 1987, General Hospital entered into a transitional phase that lasted until Wendy Riche took the position of executive producer in 1992. Under Riche, the show gained critical acclaim for its sensitive handling of social issues. In 1994, Riche started an annual Nurses' Ball, a fundraiser and HIV/AIDS awareness event both on the show and in real life. Later that year, a heart transplantation storyline involves the death of eight-year-old B. J. Jones (daughter of Dr. Tony Jones and Bobbie Spencer) in a bus crash and the subsequent donation of her heart to her dying cousin Maxie Jones. Shortly afterwards, Monica Quartermaine (Leslie Charleson) begins a long battle with breast cancer, which leads to her adopting Emily Quartermaine, the orphaned young daughter of Monica's friend from treatment. General Hospital was also praised for the love story of teenagers Stone Cates (Michael Sutton) and Robin Scorpio (Kimberly McCullough). After a struggle that lasted throughout most of 1995, Stone dies from AIDS at the age of 19 and his death is followed by 17-year-old Robin having to deal with being HIV-positive as a result of their relationship. Sutton received a nomination for the Daytime Emmy Award for Outstanding Supporting Actor in a Drama Series and McCullough won a Daytime Emmy Award for Outstanding Younger Actress in a Drama Series award. ABC featured an Afterschool Special "Positive: A Journey Into AIDS" revolving around the AIDS story as well as The New York Times best selling novel Robin's Diary.

On Saturday, December 14, 1996, General Hospital aired its one of three primetime episodes, General Hospital: Twist of Fate, which picked up where that Friday's episode had left off. The special centered on Laura's supposed death at the hands of Stefan Cassadine. In 1997, the show's long-rumored spin-off materialized into the half-hour serial, Port Charles. The series' 11,000th episode aired on February 20, 2006. On April 23, 2009, General Hospital became ABC's first regular daytime drama to be taped and broadcast in High-definition television, though the 2008 season of its primetime spinoff General Hospital: Night Shift was in high definition. This is the second daytime drama to move to high definition after CBS's The Young and the Restless. On February 23, 2010, the series aired its 12,000th episode. On December 1, 2011, ABC confirmed that former One Life to Live executive producer Frank Valentini and head writer Ron Carlivati would replace longtime executive producer Jill Farren Phelps and Garin Wolf, respectively, though Wolf would remain on as a regular writer. The change took effect on January 9, 2012. The first episode under the direction of Valentini aired on February 1, 2012, with Carlivati's material beginning on February 21. Several storylines reminiscent of iconic story arcs of the past were created and popular characters returned to the show in order to commemorate the 50th anniversary of the series in 2013. The serial celebrated 13,000 episodes on February 24, 2014, and marked its 51st anniversary several weeks later on April 1. Also in January 2014, ABC renewed Carlivati's contract with the soap. The series marked its 52nd anniversary on April 1, 2015, with a special episode revolving around the Spencer family.

In July 2015, it was revealed Carlivati was fired as head writer; Shelly Altman and Jean Passanante were hired as his successors. On September 16, 2016, Daytime Confidential reported that Valentini, Passanante and Altman re-signed with the show. On June 6, 2017, Passanante announced her decision to retire from the serial. On July 29, 2017, it was revealed through Passanante that breakdown writer Chris Van Etten would be promoted to co-head writer as her successor. On February 23, 2018, the serial aired its 14,000th episode. On July 30, 2019, Altman announced her retirement; breakdown writer Dan O'Connor was named as her successor, joining Van Etten as co-head writer. On June 22, 2022, the soap aired its 15,000 episode; in celebration, the episode focused on Francis' Laura Spencer.

On January 22, 2024, it was announced Van Etten and O'Connor had been dismissed from their positions as co-head writers; former associate head writer Patrick Mulcahey and present script editor Elizabeth Korte were named as their replacements. Per reports, material from the former regime aired into March 2024. Five months later, it was announced Mulcahey had been dismissed from his position as head writer. Mulcahey's final credited episode aired on August 6; the following day, it was announced Van Etten would resume the role of co-head writer credit, with Cathy LePard named as associate head writer. General Hospital aired its 16,000th episode on July 13, 2026.

=== Production ===
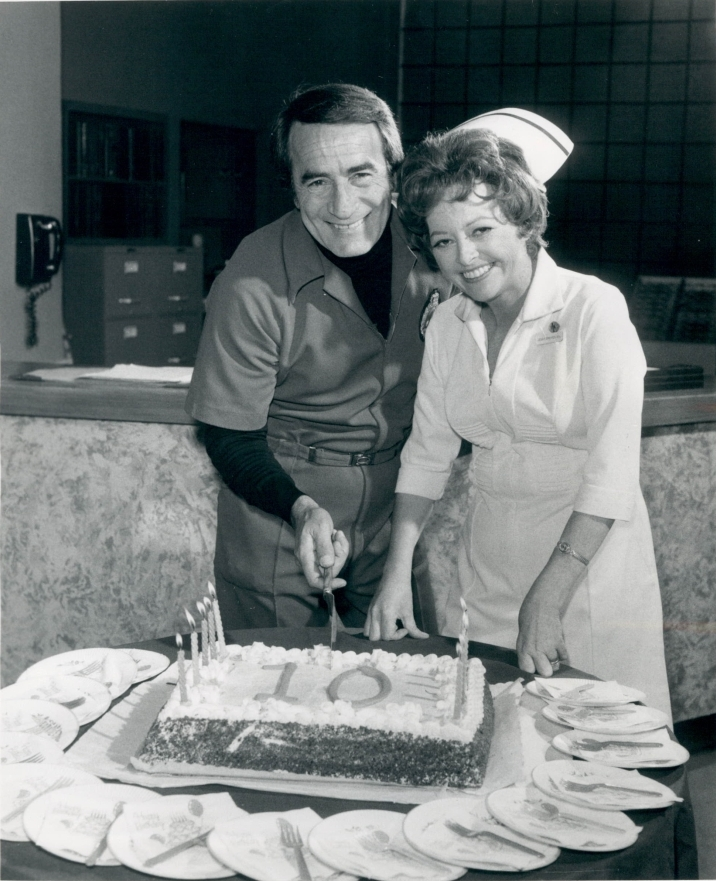
John Beradino and Emily McLaughlin celebrating the 10th anniversary of the show in 1973

General Hospital has aired on the ABC television network and has been filmed in Hollywood since its inception. The show was filmed in the Sunset Gower Studios from 1963 to the mid-1980s. It relocated in the 1980s to The Prospect Studios.

General Hospital has had a number of different distributors throughout the show's history. From its beginning until 1968, it was a co-production of Plitt Theatres and Selmur Productions. ABC bought the series outright in 1968 and its ownership passed from Selmur to American Broadcasting Companies, Inc., ABC's old separate conglomerate. Ownership of the soap was then passed in 1986 to Capital Cities/ABC, which was formed after the acquisition of ABC by a smaller media concern, Capital Cities Communications. The Walt Disney Company bought Capital Cities/ABC in 1996, and Disney has held ownership of the soap since then under ABC, making this the last non-news dramatic entertainment show directly produced and copyrighted by the network rather than 20th Television, successor-in-interest to many ABC production company predecessors.

Production of General Hospital was suspended in March 2020, as a direct result of the COVID-19 pandemic in the United States. Production resumed on July 22 of the same year; new episodes began airing on August 3, 2020. General Hospital was Disney's first series to go back into production during the pandemic.

== Cast ==
The cast photo of General Hospital, taken in celebration of the soap's 60th anniversary (2023). Front row (l–r): Josh Kelly, Sofia Mattsson, James Patrick Stuart, Finola Hughes, Donnell Turner, Dominic Zamprogna, Kelly Monaco, Cynthia Watros, Maurice Benard, Genie Francis, Jon Lindstrom, Laura Wright, Nancy Lee Grahn, Michael Easton, Jophielle Love, Rebecca Herbst, Jane Elliot, Josh Swickard, William Lipton, Kristina Wagner, John J. York Middle row: Charles Shaughnessy, Carolyn Hennesy, Tristan Rogers, Lynn Herring, Kin Shriner, Jacklyn Zeman, Robert Gossett, Brook Kerr, Nicholas Chavez, Tabyana Ali, Avery Kristen Pohl, Kathleen Gati, Eden McCoy, Evan Hofer, Gregory Harrison, Kirsten Storms, Cameron Mathison, Bradford Anderson, Maura West, Lisa LoCicero, Wally Kurth, Tajh Bellow, Haley Pullos, Lexi Ainsworth, Amanda Setton, Chad Duell, Viron Weaver, Katelyn MacMullen, Parry Shen, Lydia Look, Vernee Watson, Tanisha Harper Back row: Cassandra James, Roger Howarth

Original cast
Character	Actor
Cynthia Allison	Carolyn Craig
Jessie Brewer	Emily McLaughlin
Dr. Phil Brewer	Roy Thinnes
Angie Costello	Jana Taylor
Mike Costello	Ralph Manza
Fred Fleming	Simon Scott
Janet Fleming	Ruth Phillips
Dr. Steve Hardy	John Beradino
Roy Lansing	Robert Clarke
Priscilla Longworth	Allison Hayes
Dr. Ken Martin	Hunt Powers
Peggy Mercer	K. T. Stevens
Philip Mercer	Neil Hamilton
Mrs. Weeks	Lenore Kingston
Al Weeks	Tom Brown
Eddie Weeks	Craig Curtis

=== Characters ===
Though the series originally focused on solely the medical staff at Port Charles' General Hospital, and starred John Beradino as Dr. Steve Hardy and Emily McLaughlin as Nurse Jessie Brewer, the series branched out and began to focus more on the people and families of the town of Port Charles rather than those solely in the hospital.

Port Charles is full of "dysfunctional family dynamics ... and family drama remains the focal point of this town." The current families on the show include the quarreling and wealthy Quartermaine family, the mobster crime Corinthos family, the middle class Scorpio/Jones family, the aristocratic Cassadine family, and the adventurous Spencer family.

== Executive producers and head writers ==
=== Executive producers ===
List of General Hospital executive producers
Name	Years	Production notes
Selig J. Seligman	1963	
James Young	1963–1976	
Tom Donovan	1976–1977	
Gloria Monty	1978–1987	
H. Wesley Kenney	1987–1989	
Joseph Hardy	1989–1990	
Gloria Monty	1991–1992	
Wendy Riche	1992–2001	
Jill Farren Phelps	2001–2012	
Frank Valentini	2012–present	

=== Head writers ===
List of General Hospital head writers
Name(s)	Years	Production notes
Theodore Ferro	1963	
Mathilde Ferro	1963	
Terence Maples	1963–1964	Served as co-head writers with Frank and Doris Hursley in 1964.
Joan Maples	1963–1964	Served as co-head writers with Frank and Doris Hursley in 1964.
Catherine Turney	1963	
Milton Geiger	1963–1964	Served as co-head writer with Frank and Doris Hursley in 1964.
Rick Vollaertz	1963	
Melvyn Levy	1963	
Frank Hursley	1963–1973	
Doris Hursley	1963–1973	
Bridget Dobson	1973–1975	
Jerome Dobson	1973–1975	
Richard Holland	1975	
Suzanne Holland	1975	
Eileen Prince Pollack	1976–1977	
Patrick Mason Pollack	1976–1977	
Irving Elman	1977	
Tex Elman	1977	
Eileen Prince Pollack	1977	
Patrick Mason Pollack	1977	
Douglas Marland	1977–1979	
Pat Falken Smith	1979–1982	
Margaret DePriest	1979–1982	
Robert J. Shaw	1982	
John William Corrington	1983	
Joyce Hooper Corrington	1983	
Anne Howard Bailey	1983–1985	
Pat Falken Smith	1985–1988	
Norma Monty	1985–1988	
Ann Marcus	1988	
Gene Palumbo	1989–1991	
Norma Monty	1991–1992	
Linda Grover	1992	Served as co-head writer with Norma Monty in 1992.
Maralyn Thoma	1992	
Bill Levinson	1992–1993	
Claire Labine	1993–1996	
Robert Guza Jr.	1996	
Karen Harris	1996–1997 (Note: Karen Harris served as co-head writer with Robert Guza Jr. in 1996, and remained as co-head writer with Richard Culliton in 1997.)	
Richard Culliton	1997	
Janet Iacobuzio	1997	
Christopher Whitesell	1997	
Robert Guza Jr.	1997–2000	
Michele Val Jean	2001	
Elizabeth Korte	2001	
Megan McTavish	2001–2002	
Robert Guza Jr.	2002–2006	
Charles Pratt Jr.	2002–2006	
Robert Guza Jr.	2006–2008	
Garin Wolf	2008	2007–2008 Writers Guild of America strike
Robert Guza Jr.	2008–2011	
Garin Wolf	2011–2012	
Garin Wolf	2012	
Shelly Altman	2012	
Ron Carlivati	2012–2015	
Shelly Altman	2015–2017	
Jean Passanante	2015–2017	
Shelly Altman	2017–2019	
Chris Van Etten	2017–2019	
Chris Van Etten	2019–2023	
Dan O'Connor	2019–2023	
—N/a	2023	2023 Writers Guild of America strike
Chris Van Etten	2023–2024	
Dan O'Connor	2023–2024	
Elizabeth Korte	2024	
Patrick Mulcahey	2024	
Elizabeth Korte	since 2024	
Chris Van Etten	since 2024	

== Setting ==
Since the series began in 1963, Port Charles, New York, has been the setting for the show. The town exists in the same fictional universe as other soap opera settings such as Llanview (One Life to Live), Pine Valley (All My Children), New York City (Ryan's Hope), and Corinth (Loving). The same setting was also used for General Hospital's spinoff, Port Charles.

- General Hospital is founded by Dr. Steve Hardy. It is a major employer in the city, and one of the largest medical facilities on the East Coast. In the 1990s, Sonny Corinthos donates an extra wing dedicated to AIDS research, and in the 2000s, Carly Corinthos donates a pediatric center for head neurology. In 2009, a fire destroys the hospital, which is rebuilt with money from the Quartermaine family.
- The Metro Court is a prominent hotel in Port Charles, built by Jasper Jacks on the site of the Port Charles Hotel after it is destroyed in a fire in 2004, and named in honor of Courtney Matthews, who Jax was pursuing romantically. Carly Corinthos soon becomes his business partner, and later co-owns with Kate Howard when Jax sells his portion to her. The hotel boasts a skyline restaurant, spa, penthouse suites, and business offices. The current owners are Carly and Olivia Falconeri.
- Kelly's Diner is founded by Joe "Paddy" Kelly, and becomes a vintage restaurant in the heart of Port Charles. It features boarding rooms upstairs which become homes to many Port Charles residents and guests over the years. The restaurant is operated by Paddy's wife Rose Kelly after his death, who later sells it to Ruby Anderson when Rose leaves town. When Ruby dies, she leaves the diner to her niece Bobbie Spencer and nephew Luke Spencer.
- The Haunted Star is a yacht first owned by Luke Spencer, who receives the vessel as a wedding present in 1981. In 2003, the ship is turned into a casino by Luke and investors Skye Chandler and Tracy Quartermaine. In 2011, Luke's daughter Lulu Spencer purchases the boat, and in 2012 Johnny Zacchara invests to become co-owner. Together they turn the ship into a nightclub. The ship was destroyed in 2023.
- The Floating Rib is a bar located in downtown Port Charles, just a block away from General Hospital. Originally named Jake's, the bar has been a hotspot for the local nightlife since the early 1990s. Coleman Ratcliffe becomes the owner in 2002, and Mac Scorpio takes over in 2012. There was also a popular fine dining restaurant in Port Charles with the same name in the late 1970s/early 1980s. In 2020, a bomb destroys the restaurant and kills multiple patrons.

== Accolades and recognition ==
General Hospital's cast and crew have won many awards since 1974 when the Daytime Emmy Awards were created. In 2012, the Creative Arts Emmy Awards were created. General Hospital has won 16 Daytime Emmys for Daytime Emmy Award for Outstanding Drama Series.

In June 2009, TV Guide ranked "Luke and Laura's Wedding" at number forty-five on its list of the 100 Greatest Episodes. In December 2023, Variety ranked General Hospital number eighty-eight on its list of "100 Greatest TV Shows of All Time". Citing the Luke and Laura pairing as reason for the soap's "stratospheric heights", the magazine also called the soap's celebration of it sixtieth anniversary a "feat".

== Broadcast ==
During the 1960s, General Hospital earned decent ratings against the likes of To Tell the Truth and The Secret Storm on CBS, but there was a decline as the 1970s came, especially when NBC's Another World became highly popular. For two years, it also faced CBS's The Price Is Right, already a major hit. After continued mediocrity in the Nielsen ratings, ABC was prepared to cancel General Hospital, but decided to give it a second chance in 1978 when it expanded the show from an experimental 45 minutes to a full hour. However, the expansion came with an ultimatum to the producers that they had six months to improve the show's ratings. Gloria Monty was hired as the new executive producer, and on her first day, she spent an extra $100,000 re-taping four episodes. A miracle occurred thanks to Monty and head writer Douglas Marland; the show became the most-watched daytime drama by 1979, marking a rare instance of a daytime serial's comeback from near-extinction. During the wedding of Luke and Laura on November 17, 1981, about 30 million people tuned in to watch them exchange vows and be cursed by Elizabeth Taylor's Helena Cassadine.

From 1979 to 1988, General Hospital remained number one in the ratings, competing against two game shows and two low-rated soaps on NBC—Texas and Santa Barbara—and Guiding Light on CBS (although Guiding Light experienced a renaissance for a brief period in the middle of 1984, and became the #1-rated soap, briefly dethroning General Hospital from the top ratings spot). For the most part, however, General Hospital continued to triumph, even after the departure of popular actors Anthony Geary and Genie Francis in the mid-1980s. Although The Young and the Restless took General Hospital's place as the highest-rated serial in 1989, General Hospital continued to maintain excellent ratings.

Even at its peak in the 1980s, General Hospital had been pre-empted in at least two markets in the United States. With the show still number one in the Nielsens, WDTN in Dayton, Ohio preempted the series upon joining ABC in January 1980 in favor of Woody Woodpecker and Super Friends cartoons. Later, the station would air such shows as Hour Magazine, Geraldo and Maury in the show's timeslot until September 2000, when the station's new owners, Sunrise Broadcasting (which purchased the station from Hearst Television two years prior), pulled Maury from the station's schedule, due to what it called "community standards", and brought General Hospital back to Dayton. In Vermont and Plattsburgh, New York, WVNY dropped General Hospital from the schedule in the 1980s and would only bring it back in 1995. During that hiatus, General Hospital still aired on Montreal's CFCF-DT, whose signal was decently available in Vermont and Plattsburgh.

Ever since the 1991–1992 season of General Hospital, the show has had a steady decline in ratings. On and off, it would rank between third and fifth place in the Nielsen ratings, with CBS's The Young And The Restless and The Bold and the Beautiful coming in first and second place, respectively. General Hospital remained in between third and fifth place in the ratings during that time, and from late 1991 to 1996 All My Children held the title of ABC's highest-rated soap.

After months of speculation and cancellation rumors, Deadline Hollywood reported on April 11, 2012, that ABC quietly made the decision to keep General Hospital on the air and to cancel instead the lower-rated talk show The Revolution. On June 26, 2012, ABC officially announced that General Hospital would move to the 2 p.m. ET/PT timeslot starting on September 10, 2012, and that the network would give the 3:00 p.m. hour back to its affiliates, as it was the recommended time slot for Katie Couric's new, ABC-syndicated talk show, Katie.

Encore episodes were shown every weeknight on the former cable channel Soapnet, with a marathon on Saturday and classic episodes at 4 a.m. EST and 5 a.m. (3 a.m. and 4 a.m. CST).

Production of General Hospital was suspended in March 2020 as a direct result of the COVID-19 pandemic in the United States. The show had banked roughly two months' worth of episodes at that time. By airing repeats on "Flashback Fridays", General Hospital was able to air original episodes through the week ending of May 21. This was followed by several weeks of vintage episode repeats. Production resumed on July 22, 2020, and new episodes began airing on August 3.

On October 22, 2024, it was announced 10Play, a free video-on-demand and catch-up TV service by Network 10, would carry the soap in Australia beginning January 1, 2025. Foxtel's W previously broadcast the soap in 2011.

=== Schedule ===
General Hospital broadcast history
Start date	End date	Time slot (ET)	Run time (minutes)
April 1, 1963	December 27, 1963	1:00 p.m.	30
December 30, 1963	July 23, 1976	3:00 p.m.	30
July 26, 1976	January 13, 1978	3:15 p.m.	45
January 16, 1978	September 7, 2012	3:00 p.m.	60
September 10, 2012	present	2:00 p.m. (Note: In September 2014, General Hospital reclaimed its former time slot of 3:00 p.m. Eastern/2:00 Central and Pacific on ABC owned-and-operated stations in New York City, Philadelphia, Raleigh–Durham, Chicago, Houston, San Francisco and Los Angeles; and affiliate KSAT-TV in San Antonio. In September 2025, General Hospital will reclaim its former 3:00 p.m. Eastern time slot on Boston affiliate WCVB-TV.)	60

==== Notes ====
ABC stations in the Mountain and Pacific time zones, and in Alaska, Hawaii and Guam follow a Central Time Zone schedule for daytime programming; thus, General Hospital is scheduled by the network to air at 1:00 p.m. in these areas (for the latter, unless delayed for live prime time mainland sports or breaking news coverage, which otherwise takes precedence).

=== Ratings history ===
For historical ratings information, see List of American daytime soap opera ratings

Years as #1 series

General Hospital ratings history
Year(s)	Household Rating
1979–1980	9.9
1980–1981	11.4
1981–1982	11.2
1982–1983	9.8
1983–1984	10.0
1984–1985	9.1
1985–1986	9.2
1986–1987	8.3
1987–1988	8.1 (Tied with The Young and the Restless)

Highest-rated week in daytime history (November 16–20, 1981)
(Household ratings, Nielsen Media Research)

General Hospital ratings history
Serial	Household rating	(Time slot) network	Millions of households
1. General Hospital	16.0	(3–4pm) ABC	13,040,000
2. All My Children	10.2	(1–2pm) ABC	8,313,000
3. One Life to Live	10.2	(2–3pm) ABC	8,313,000
4. Guiding Light	7.9	(3–4pm) CBS	6,438,500

== Parodies and references in other media ==
The popularity of General Hospital has gained it many parodies and references in other mainstream programs. For example:

- In the early 1990s, some episodes of General Hospital were featured as "shorts" during the fourth season of the parody show Mystery Science Theater 3000.
- The series was also parodied/homaged in the song "General Hospi-Tale" by The Afternoon Delights, and in the film Tootsie, which took place among the cast and crew of a fictional soap opera program.
- In the Fox medical drama House, Gregory House enjoys Prescription Passion, which is an over-the-top parody of General Hospital that he watches constantly. In the season three episode, "Half-Wit", House hides his blood test results under the name, "Luke N. Laura", referring to General Hospital's popular couple.
- In the 1970s, The Muppet Show had a recurring sketch called "Veterinarian's Hospital" parodying the hospital soap opera/drama genre clearly inspired by General Hospital and shows like it.
- Mad TV did a sketch on the series with actors Jacklyn Zeman, Rebecca Herbst, and Jacob Young.
- The 1982 comedy film Young Doctors in Love featured a large part of General Hospital's cast from 1982.
- The February 23, 2000 episode of Late Show with David Letterman covers a faux segment of the program with regards to David Letterman's heart surgery.
- In a 2010 episode of The Colbert Report, comedian Stephen Colbert poked fun at the show, responding to a clip of Maurice Benard's Sonny Corinthos shooting Dominic Zamprogna's Dante Falconeri, satirically screaming, "Sonny shot Dante! No!"
- In the ABC comedy The Goldbergs, Erica and Adam frequently watch General Hospital together.
- In the book series Virgin River by Robyn Carr, Mel mentions watching General Hospital in nursing school.

== Spin-offs and specials ==
The success of the long-running soap opera has had one sister serial, one spinoff in the United States, and two primetime spinoffs in the United States and the United Kingdom.

The Young Marrieds was ABC's first attempt at a sister serial for General Hospital. It ran for only two years, racking up a total of 380 episodes. Despite its moderate popularity, it was aired against CBS's top-rated The Edge of Night, which it could not compete against. The series finale aired on March 25, 1966, with the show's main protagonist contemplating suicide. It ended in a cliffhanger, leaving the audience wondering if the man had killed himself or not. The Young Marrieds was set in the fictional suburb of Queen's Point, which was considered by the writers to be a suburb of Port Charles.

The British television series General Hospital did not feature any characters from the American show, but was modeled after its format. It started as a half-hour program broadcast in the afternoons, which was unusual for British serials that normally aired in prime time. In 1975, it was expanded to an hour-long format and moved to Friday evenings.

Port Charles was a daytime drama that initially featured interns in a competitive medical school program, and was known for having more action actually in the hospital than General Hospital itself. It also included the characters of Scott Baldwin, Serena Baldwin, Lucy Coe, Kevin Collins, and Karen Wexler, all of whom originally appeared as characters on General Hospital. As the show evolved, it tended more towards gothic intrigue, including supernatural elements such as vampires and afterlife. It also switched formats from an open-ended daytime serial to 13-week story arcs known as "books", similar to Spanish-language telenovelas.

General Hospital: Night Shift is the second American prime time spinoff of a daytime drama (the first being Our Private World, a spinoff of As the World Turns). Its first season aired from July 12, 2007, to October 4, 2007, on Soapnet, a cable channel owned by ABC. The series follows the nighttime adventures of familiar and new characters around the hospital. As of March 2008, the first season of the series was "Soapnet's most-watched series ever", with ABC Daytime and Soapnet President Brian Frons noting that Night Shift drew more than 1 million new viewers to the channel during its first season.

General Hospital: Twist of Fate was a primetime special that aired on Saturday, December 14, 1996. The episode picked up where that Friday's show had left off. The special centered on Laura's supposed death at the hands of Stefan Cassadine.

On April 2, 1998, General Hospital aired a primetime special in celebration of the program's 35th anniversary. Hosted by Anthony Geary, the show focused and recapped on many popular storylines including Monica Quartermaine's breast cancer, BJ's death, and Stone Cates' battle with HIV. This was the first anniversary special that was broadcast in primetime and that did not include any of the current storyline.

On April 6, 2013, as part of the show's 50th anniversary commemoration, ABC's newsmagazine 20/20 aired General Hospital: The Real Soap Dish—a retrospective and behind-the-scenes special hosted by Katie Couric.

On September 5, 2014, it was announced that cast member Nancy Lee Grahn would begin to host a companion web series for ABC.com in January 2015, General Hospital Now!, which would feature behind-the-scenes interviews with fellow cast members, as well as panel discussions with comedians who are fans of the show.

On May 15 and 18, 2015, General Hospital aired two live episodes as part of its 52nd anniversary celebration, using the hashtag #GHLive to promote the broadcast on social media.

On December 15, 2023, it was announced ABC would air a primetime special General Hospital: 60 Years of Stars and Storytelling, in celebration of the soap's sixtieth anniversary. The special featured interviews with present and former cast members, behind-the-scenes footage, blooper reels and a "special fan tribute". The special aired on January 4, 2024.

== Bibliography ==
- Gary Warner, General Hospital: The Complete Scrapbook, Stoddart (November 1995), ISBN 1-881649-40-7
- Gerard J. Waggett, The Official General Hospital Trivia Book, ABC (October 1997), ISBN 0-7868-8275-1
