= CBS Daytime =

Daytime programming block on CBS

- Country: United States
- Network: CBS

Ownership
- Owner: Skydance

Links
- Website: Official website

CBS Daytime is the division of the CBS television network that is responsible for the daytime television block programming on the network's late morning and early afternoon schedule. The block has historically encompassed soap operas and game shows.

== Schedule ==
All regular times listed are in Eastern Time Zone.

10:00 am – 11:00 am/3:00 pm – 4:00 pm	Let's Make a Deal or local programming
11:00 am – 12:00 pm	The Price Is Right
12:30 pm – 1:30 pm	The Young and the Restless
1:30 pm – 2:00 pm	The Bold and the Beautiful
2:00 pm – 3:00 pm	Beyond the Gates

Most CBS affiliates in the Central, Mountain, and Pacific time zones, and in Alaska and Hawaii air this schedule one hour earlier (starting at 9:00 am); local schedules may differ over all time zones.

- CBS provides two separate feeds of Let's Make a Deal, at 10:00 am or 3:00 pm Eastern time (9:00 am and 2:00 pm Central time); affiliates who follow the network's master schedule have the option to air the program in either timeslot.
- CBS provides an alternate feed of The Young and the Restless at 11:00 am Central time (12:00 pm Eastern); this feed is used by some stations outside of the Eastern Time Zone to accommodate their Noon hour local newscasts. CBS stations who utilize this option include network-owned WCCO-TV in Minneapolis and KPIX-TV in San Francisco, and affiliates KLAS-TV in Las Vegas, KMOV in St. Louis, and KIRO-TV in Seattle.
- Some CBS affiliates air The Young and the Restless and The Bold and the Beautiful at different times other than 12:30/11:00 am and 1:30/12:30 pm (e.g. KIRO-TV in Seattle, which airs the show at 12:00 pm and 2:00 pm, and WTSP in Tampa, which airs the show at 3:00 pm).

== Current programs ==
=== Game shows ===
==== Let's Make a Deal ====
- Debut: October 5, 2009
- Replaced program: Guiding Light
- Taping location: Haven Studios, Glendale, California
- Host: Wayne Brady
- Announcer: Jonathan Mangum
- Production Company: Marcus/Glass Entertainment in association with Fremantle/RTL Group
- Producing Team: John Quinn (executive producer)
- Directing/Writing Team: Lenn Goodside (director)

==== The Price Is Right ====
- Debut: September 4, 1972
- Replaced program: The Beverly Hillbillies
- Taping location: Haven Studios, Glendale, California
- Host: Drew Carey
- Announcer: George Gray
- Production Company: Fremantle/RTL Group
- Producing Team: Evelyn Warfel (executive producer), Adam Sandler (co-executive producer), Adam Sandler (producer), Stan Blits, Sue MacIntyre (co-producers), Vanessa Voss (prize producer), Gina Edwards Nyman (associate producer)
- Directing/Writing Team: Adam Sandler (director)

=== Soap operas ===
==== The Young and the Restless ====
- Debut: March 26, 1973
- Replaced program: Where the Heart Is
- Taping location: Television City, Los Angeles, California (stage 41 and 43)
- Creators: William J. Bell and Lee Phillip Bell
- Production company: Bell Dramatic Serial Company and Corday Productions in association with Sony Pictures Television
- Producing team: Sally McDonald (executive producer); John Fisher (supervising producer); Jonathan Fishman, Matthew J. Olsen, Vivian Gundaker, Elizabeth LeBrun (producers)
- Directing team: Michael Eilbaum, Elizabeth Hendrickson, Kai Kim, Dean LaMont, Nancy Ortenberg, Owen Renfroe
- Head writer: Dan O'Connor, Jamey Giddens
- Other writers: Jeff Beldner, James Harmon Brown, Lisa Connor, Marin Gazzaniga, Janet Iacobuzio, Marla Kanelos
- Casting director: Greg Salmon
- Cast: List of The Young and the Restless cast members

==== The Bold and the Beautiful ====
- Debut: March 23, 1987
- Replaced program: Capitol
- Taping location: Sunset Las Palmas Studios, Hollywood, California (stage 3/8 and 6)
- Creators: William J. Bell, Lee Phillip Bell
- Production company: Bell-Phillip Television Productions Inc.
- Producing team: Bradley Bell (executive producer); Casey Kasprzyk (co-executive producer); Rachel A. Herman, Cynthia J. Popp (producers); Nayeli Gomez (line producer)
- Directing team: Jennifer Howard, Anthony Pascarelli, Popp, Heather Tom
- Head writers: Bradley Bell
- Other writers: Rex M. Best, Michael Minnis, Mark V. Pincotti
- Casting director: Christy Dooley
- Cast: List of The Bold and the Beautiful cast members

==== Beyond the Gates ====
- Debut: February 24, 2025
- Replaced program: The Talk
- Taping location: Assembly Studios, Doraville, Georgia
- Creator: Michele Val Jean
- Production companies: CBS Studios, NAACP, Procter & Gamble Studios
- Producing team: Val Jean, Sheila Ducksworth, Leon Russell, Derrick Johnson, Lela Coffey, Tracey Thomson, Julie Hanan Carruthers, Anna Saalfeld (executive producers)
- Directing team: Shelley Curtis, Shante Fripp, Sonia Blangiardo Goins, Pascarelli, Michael V. Pomarico, Steven Williford
- Head writers: Val Jean, Thomson
- Other writers: Susan Dansby, Skyy Sandifer (script editors); Anthony Lucente (continuity and research producer); Anna Asher (script supervisor); Jazmen Darnell Brown, Cheryl L. Davis, Charlotte Gibson, Lucente, G. Fulton Ponder, Sandifer, Judy Tate (scriptwriters); Sara A. Bibel, Christopher Dunn, Giddens, Lucente, Michael Montgomery, Natalie Minardi Slater, Teresa Zimmerman (breakdown writers)
- Casting director: Kim Coleman
- Cast: List of Beyond the Gates cast members

== Former shows on CBS Daytime ==
=== Soap opera ===
Winners and nominees
Title	Premiere date	Finale date	Episodes	Ref(s).
As the World Turns	April 2, 1956	September 17, 2010	13,858	
The Brighter Day	January 4, 1954	September 28, 1962		
Capitol	March 29, 1982	March 20, 1987	1,293	
The Clear Horizon	July 11, 1960	June 15, 1962	254	
The Edge of Night	April 2, 1956	November 28, 1975		
The Egg and I	September 3, 1951	August 1, 1952	240	
The First Hundred Years	December 4, 1950	June 27, 1952		
For Better or Worse	June 29, 1959	June 24, 1960	268	
Full Circle	June 27, 1960	March 10, 1961	185	
Guiding Light	June 30, 1952	September 18, 2009	18,262	
Hotel Cosmopolitan	1957	1958		
Love Is a Many Splendored Thing	September 18, 1967	March 23, 1973		
Love of Life	September 24, 1951	February 1, 1980		
Portia Faces Life	April 5, 1954	July 1, 1955		
The Road of Life	1954	1955		
Search for Tomorrow	September 3, 1951	December 26, 1982		
The Secret Storm	February 1, 1954	February 8, 1974		
The Seeking Heart	1954	1955		
Valiant Lady	October 12, 1953	August 16, 1957		
Where the Heart Is	September 8, 1969	March 23, 1973		
Women with a Past	1954	1954		

=== Talk show ===
- The Talk (2010–2024)

=== Game shows ===
Despite little genre output when compared to NBC and ABC, CBS is the last remaining Big Three television networks to carry daytime game shows. While NBC and ABC were still producing several game shows in daytime, CBS gave up on the format during the 1967–68 season. From 1968 until March 1972, the network carried no game shows. However, as part of CBS's "rural purge" effort to lure wealthier suburban viewers, CBS executive Fred Silverman commissioned the game show Amateur's Guide to Love. Hosted by Gene Rayburn, the show ran from March 27 to June 23.

Despite the failure of Amateur's Guide, Silverman commissioned three other games for debut on September 4 – The New Price Is Right, Gambit, and The Joker's Wild – to replace the reruns seen in the daytime slots up to this point. All were major hits, and more games were added as time went on; Joker ended in 1975 and Gambit in 1976, but both have spawned revivals. The Price Is Right has aired continuously in daytime on CBS since its debut.

Currently, CBS carries two network games: The Price Is Right and a revival of Let's Make a Deal, which debuted in 2009. Prior to Deal, the last game on CBS (other than Price) was the Ray Combs-hosted revival of Family Feud, which aired from 1988 to 1993.

- Missus Goes a Shopping (1947–1949; renamed This Is the Missus in November 1948)
- Beat the Clock (1950–1958, 1979–1980; renamed All-Star Beat the Clock in November 1979)
- Winner Take All (1951)
- Strike It Rich (1951–1958)
- Your Surprise Store (1952)
- Wheel of Fortune (1952–1953; not the same game show as the 1989–1991 version)
- Double or Nothing (1952–1954)
- There's One In Every Family (1952–1953)
- Freedom Rings (1953)
- I'll Buy That (1953–1954)
- The Big Payoff (1953–1959)
- On Your Account (1954–1956)
- Love Story (1955–1956)
- Dotto (1958)
- How Do You Rate? (1958)
- For Love or Money (1958–1959)
- Top Dollar (1958–1959; replaced Dotto)
- Play Your Hunch (1958–1959)
- Video Village (1960–1962)
- Your Surprise Package (1961–1962)
- Double Exposure (1961)
- Face the Facts (1961)
- Password (1961–1967; replaced Face the Facts)
- To Tell the Truth (1962–1968)
- The Amateur's Guide to Love (1972)
- Gambit (1972–1976)
- The Joker's Wild (1972–1975)
- Hollywood's Talking (1973)
- The $10,000 Pyramid (1973–1974)
- Match Game '73–'79 (1973–1979; replaced Hollywood's Talking)
- Now You See It (1974–1975 and April–July 1989; replaced Card Sharks in 1989)
- Tattletales (1974–1978; 1982–1984)
- Spin-Off (1975; replaced The Joker's Wild)
- Musical Chairs (1975)
- Give-n-Take (1975; replaced Spin-Off)
- Double Dare (1976–1977; replaced Gambit)
- Pass the Buck (1978)
- Tic-Tac-Dough (Summer 1978)
- Whew! (1979–1980; renamed Celebrity Whew! in November 1979)
- Child's Play (1982–1983, replaced by Press Your Luck)
- The $25,000 Pyramid (1982–1988; temporarily replaced by Blackout)
- Press Your Luck (1983–1986; replaced Child's Play)
- Body Language (1984–1986; replaced Tattletales)
- Card Sharks (1986–1989; replaced Body Language)
- Blackout (1988; replaced and subsequently replaced by The $25,000 Pyramid, later replaced by Family Feud)
- Family Feud (1988–1993; replaced The $25,000 Pyramid and Blackout; renamed Family Feud Challenge and expanded to 60 minutes in June 1992)
- Wheel of Fortune (1989–1991; replaced Now You See It)

== Past proposed series ==
- 1957: The Will to Dream by Doris Frankel about the relationship between an atomic scientist and his wife
- 1964: Roy Winsor created The Widening Circle, a spinoff of The Secret Storm. A pilot was shot with James Vickery as Alan Dunbar and Diana Muldaur as Ann Wicker.
- 1971: Fred J. Scollay created Absent Without Love.
- 1972: Winifred Wolfe and Mary Harris had a proposal for a one-hour serial titled Yesterday's Child...Tomorrow's Adult
- 1982: Beverly Hills, California
- 1983: Grosse Pointe – set in Michigan; featured competing families in the auto industry and auto racers
- 1985: series created by Johnathan Valin
- 1986: During her absence from Ryan's Hope, Michael Brockman, former President of CBS Daytime, asked Claire Labine to develop a new serial in 1986. Her proposal was entitled Celebration but never made it to the air.
- 1986: The Billionaires by Barbara Bauer and Paul Rauch

== Executives ==
Name	Title	Years	Notes
Lester Gottlieb	Director of Daytime programming	1955–1960	Began in the position in July 1955 and remaining until January 1960
Fred Silverman	Vice President of Daytime Programming	1963–1970	Oversaw the development of daytime programming before eventually heading the entire network.
Paul Rauch	Vice President of Daytime Programming	1970–1972	
Bud Grant	Vice President of Daytime Programming	1972–1975	He was the head of CBS Daytime programming at the time The Young and the Restless went into development and he gave the show the green light. Cancelled in-house produced soaps Love Is a Many Splendored Thing, Where the Heart Is, and The Secret Storm while sparing Love of Life, which improved in ratings toward the end of his tenure. Successfully relaunched an updated version of The Price Is Right, which remains on air to date.
Mike Ogiens	Vice President of Daytime Programming	1975–1980	Took over the daytime programming in 1975 and ultimately removed The Edge of Night from CBS to make room to expand As the World Turns to a full hour, expanded Guiding Light to a full hour in 1977, and later The Young and the Restless.
Jeane Renick	Vice President of Daytime Programming	1980–1986	East Coast Director, 1978-80, Manager Daytime, 1976-78. Asst. to Mike Ogiens, 1973-76. Replaced Search for Tomorrow in March 1982 with new soap opera, Capitol Subsequently replaced "Capitol" with "The Bold and the Beautiful."
Michael Brockman	Vice President of Daytime and Children's Programming	1983–1989	During his tenure he introduced seasonal campaign graphics with network slogans for the daytime promotions of CBS' daytime shows. Brockman departed in July 1989 when he left to join ABC Daytime. From 1983 to 1987, Bob Short served as Chief Consultant for CBS Daytime during Brockman's tenure.
Lucy Johnson	Senior Vice President of Daytime Programming	1989–2003	Departed her post at the end of January 2003. Johnson had been with the network for 14 years. At the time of Johnson's departure, CBS president Les Moonves went on record to state "What Lucy has achieved with our daytime lineup may never happen again. To maintain a position of leadership for more than 13 years in any field is an unbelievable accomplishment. To do it in television, where viewing habits can change dramatically, is even more impressive."
Barbara Bloom	Senior Vice President of Daytime Programming	2003–2011	Served as Executive Vice President from January 2003 to February 2011. Bloom reported to Nina Tassler who in turn reported to her boss Nancy Tellem who reported to head CBS president Les Moonves. Previously worked as a writer and producer on ABC Daytime. In an unusual move for a network executive, Bloom, a Writers Guild of America member who used to write for ABC's Port Charles, also wrote breakdowns, and accepted on-screen credit for two episodes of The Young and the Restless in 2007. Bloom gave input into the CBS soaps long-term storylines and gave extensive notes on every single outline and script – a practice that had long been in place during her tenure at ABC. She also oversaw the search for a new host of The Price Is Right, successfully replacing the retiring Bob Barker with Drew Carey as well as the introduction of CBS' first daytime talk show The Talk.
Richard Mensing	Vice President of Daytime Programming	2003–2008	Mensing was raised in Richmond, Virginia, and had been with CBS Daytime from 2003 to 2008 working alongside of Barbara Bloom, and was ABC Daytime's Creative Director from 1999 to 2002. Replaced by Michelle Newman in May 2008.
Michelle Newman	Vice President of Daytime Programming	2008–2012	Replaced Richard Menning while working alongside Barbara Bloom. Served as interim Senior Vice President after Bloom left, and until McDaniel was named as the permanent replacement for Bloom.
Angelica McDaniel	Senior Vice President of Daytime Programming	2012–2019	Assumed this position in early 2012. Joined CBS in 2010 in the Daytime division working alongside of Barbara Bloom and Michelle Newman. Job eliminated as part of CBS restructuring. CBS Daytime folded into division currently run by Amy Reisenbach.
Margot Wain	Vice President of Daytime Programming	2012–2019	Had been a CBS Daytime executive since Lucy Johnson's tenure. Wain was considered as a contender for Vice President as a successor had yet to be announced after Barbara Bloom stepped down, but the job eventually went to Angelica McDaniel, whom Wain works alongside of. She served as Director of daytime programming until being promoted to Vice President of daytime programming in September 2013.

As of 2019, CBS Daytime has been folded into the network's current programming division.

== Notable profiles ==
=== Soderberg ===
Robert Soderberg is an American TV writer. He was born in Lakewood, Ohio and died in Santa Barbara, California in 1996.

In 1969, he co-wrote the teleplay for an unsold television pilot called Shadow Man about a man who has plastic surgery and assumes the identity of a multi-billionaire to do good for all humanity.

He has thirteen credits to his name, including being the Head Writer of CBS Daytime's As the World Turns (1973–1978) and Guiding Light and ABC Daytime’s One Life to Live and General Hospital (1989).

He has received three Daytime Emmy Awards.

=== Calhoun ===
Robert Calhoun is an American television writer, producer and director.

He graduated from the University of Maryland, College Park then went on to serve three years in the United States Navy. He was a gay man.

His credits include Guiding Light (as Head Writer during the 1988 Writers Guild of America strike and Executive Producer from 1988 to 1991; replaced by Jill Farren Phelps), As the World Turns (EP: 1984–1988 replaced by Laurence Caso), Another World and Texas (1981).

He has garnered 8 Daytime Emmy Award nominations. His first nomination in 1979 was shared with Ira Cirker, Melvin Bernhardt, and Paul Lammers.

=== Frisch ===
Peter Frisch is an American TV and theatre producer and director.

He received his M.F.A. in stage direction from Carnegie Mellon. As a nationally recognized teacher and coach, Peter has held faculty posts at Carnegie, The Juilliard School, Harvard University, Boston University, Cal Arts, and UCLA. He has taught and coached professional actors and directors in New York and Los Angeles over the last forty years.

Prior to coming to Santa Barbara, Frisch served as Producer on The Young and the Restless for CBS Daytime. He came to the show directly from Pittsburgh and a six-year stint as Head of Drama at Carnegie Mellon University's prestigious School of Drama where he also taught and directed for the mainstage. Moonlighting, he also directed seventeen events for the Pittsburgh Symphony Orchestra, working with musicians such as Mariss Jansons, Marvin Hamlisch and Rolando Villazon.

During the past 35 years, Peter has directed over 160 productions in the New York and regional theatre, including a full range of classic and contemporary plays, cabaret and opera. He has been Producing Director of the Hyde Park Festival Theatre (NY), Resident Director with the Berkshire Theatre Festival and Artistic Director of American Playwrights Theatre in Washington, D.C.

Peter received a Joseph Jefferson Award for the Chicago premiere of American Dreams (co-authored with Studs Terkel) and the Outer Circle Award for My Papa's Wine on New York's Theatre Row. At American Playwrights Theatre, his collaboration with Larry L. King led to a 1988 Helen Hayes Award for The Night Hank Williams Died. Also at APT, he won an inaugural John F. Kennedy Center for the Performing Arts/American Express Grant for his production of Speaking In Tongues, about controversial film director Pier Paolo Pasolini.

Previously in Los Angeles, Peter served as a Producer on Fox Broadcasting Company's Tribes.

Frisch has been a panelist for the National Endowment for the Arts and the Fulbright Program and served as a board member of the Society of Stage Directors and Choreographers Foundation. He is an enthusiastic amateur musician and has been published in a variety of journals from Sound & Vision to The Washington Report on Middle Eastern Affairs.

== TV ratings ==
Because of a quirk in The Price Is Right from 1975 during the experimental run at a one-hour format in September that became final that November, that show's ratings in daytime are split into first half and second half segments. The same has been done for the ratings for Let's Make a Deal since that show's premiere in 2009.

== See also ==
- ABC Daytime
- NBC Daytime
