= Beyond the Gates (TV series) =

American daytime television soap opera (since 2025)

- Genre: Soap opera
- Created by: Michele Val Jean
- Showrunner: Michele Val Jean
- Written by: Michele Val Jean and Tracey Thomson
- Directed by: Sonia Blangiardo Goins; Shelley Curtis; Anthony Pascarelli; Michael V. Pomarico; Steven Williford; Phideaux Xavier
- Starring: Present cast
- Country of origin: United States
- Original language: English
- No. of episodes: 415

Production
- Executive producers: Sheila Ducksworth; Michele Val Jean; Tracey Thomson; Kimberly Doebereiner; Anna Saalfeld; Julie Hanan Carruthers; Leon W. Russell; Derrick Johnson; Lela Coffey
- Production locations: Assembly Studios (Note: In reported press releases, Beyond the Gates is produced in Atlanta, Georgia; however, Assembly Studios is located in the Atlanta suburb of Doraville.); Atlanta, Georgia
- Camera setup: Multi-camera
- Running time: approx. 37 minutes
- Production companies: CBS Studios; NAACP; Procter & Gamble Studios

Original release
- Network: CBS
- Release: February 24, 2025 – present

Related
- The Bold and the Beautiful; The Young and the Restless

Beyond the Gates is an American television soap opera created by Michele Val Jean, which has been broadcast on CBS since February 24, 2025, as part of their daytime programming block. Set in the Washington metropolitan area, the serial centers around the Dupree family, a multigenerational affluent African-American family that lives in a gated community. The serial is the first daytime television soap opera to feature a primarily African-American cast since Generations (1989–1991) and the first new daytime soap to debut on a major American broadcast network since Passions in 1999. Production commenced in November 2024 in Atlanta, Georgia. In its inaugural year of eligibility, Beyond the Gates won four out of fifteen nominations at the 53rd Daytime Emmy Awards. This included the Daytime Emmy Award for Outstanding Lead Actress in a Drama Series and the award for Outstanding Emerging Talent in a Daytime Drama Series.

== Premise ==
Beyond the Gates is set in a leafy Maryland suburb just outside of Washington D.C., and in one the most affluent African American counties in the United States.

— As described in a press release, via Paramount Global.

Set within a fictional gated community located in the affluent Maryland and Washington, D.C. area, Beyond the Gates tells "the story of a wealthy Black family in a posh, gated community." At the center of the story is the Dupree family — Vernon, Anita, Nicole and Dani — described as a "powerful and prestigious multi-generational family" and defined as "Black royalty".

== Characters ==
The central family of Beyond the Gates is the Dupree family, consisting of matriarch Anita Dupree (Tamara Tunie), her husband Vernon Dupree (Clifton Davis), and their children Nicole Dupree Richardson (Daphnée Duplaix) and Danielle "Dani" Dupree (Karla Mosley). Nicole's family is the Richardsons, consisting of husband Ted Richardson (Maurice Johnson/Keith D. Robinson) and children Martin Richardson (Brandon Claybon) and Katherine "Kat" Richardson (Colby Muhammad), and Ted's nephew Andre Richardson (Sean Freeman). Martin's husband is Bradley "Smitty" Smith (Mike Manning), and they share two children: Samantha (Najah Jackson) and Tyrell (Jaden Lucas Miller). Dani's family includes children Naomi Hamilton Hawthorne (Arielle Prepetit) and Chelsea Hamilton (RhonniRose Mantilla), shared with ex-husband Bill Hamilton (Timon Kyle Durrett). Naomi's husband is Jacob Hawthorne (Jibre Hordges), and Bill is currently married to Naomi's friend Hayley Lawson (Marquita Goings).

Secondary families include the McBrides: Vanessa (Lauren Buglioli) and Doug (Jason Graham), and their twin children; and the Thomases, Dana "Leslie" (Trisha Mann-Grant) and her daughter Eva (Ambyr Michelle). Other characters include Ashley Morgan (Jen Jacob), Caroline (Ellie Wang), Derek Baldwin (Ben Gavin), Joey Armstrong (Jon Lindstrom), Laura Peterson (Destiny Love), Pamela Curtis (Cady McClain), Randy Parker (Maurice P. Kerry), and Tomas "Tom" Navarro (Alex Alegria).

== Production ==
=== Development ===
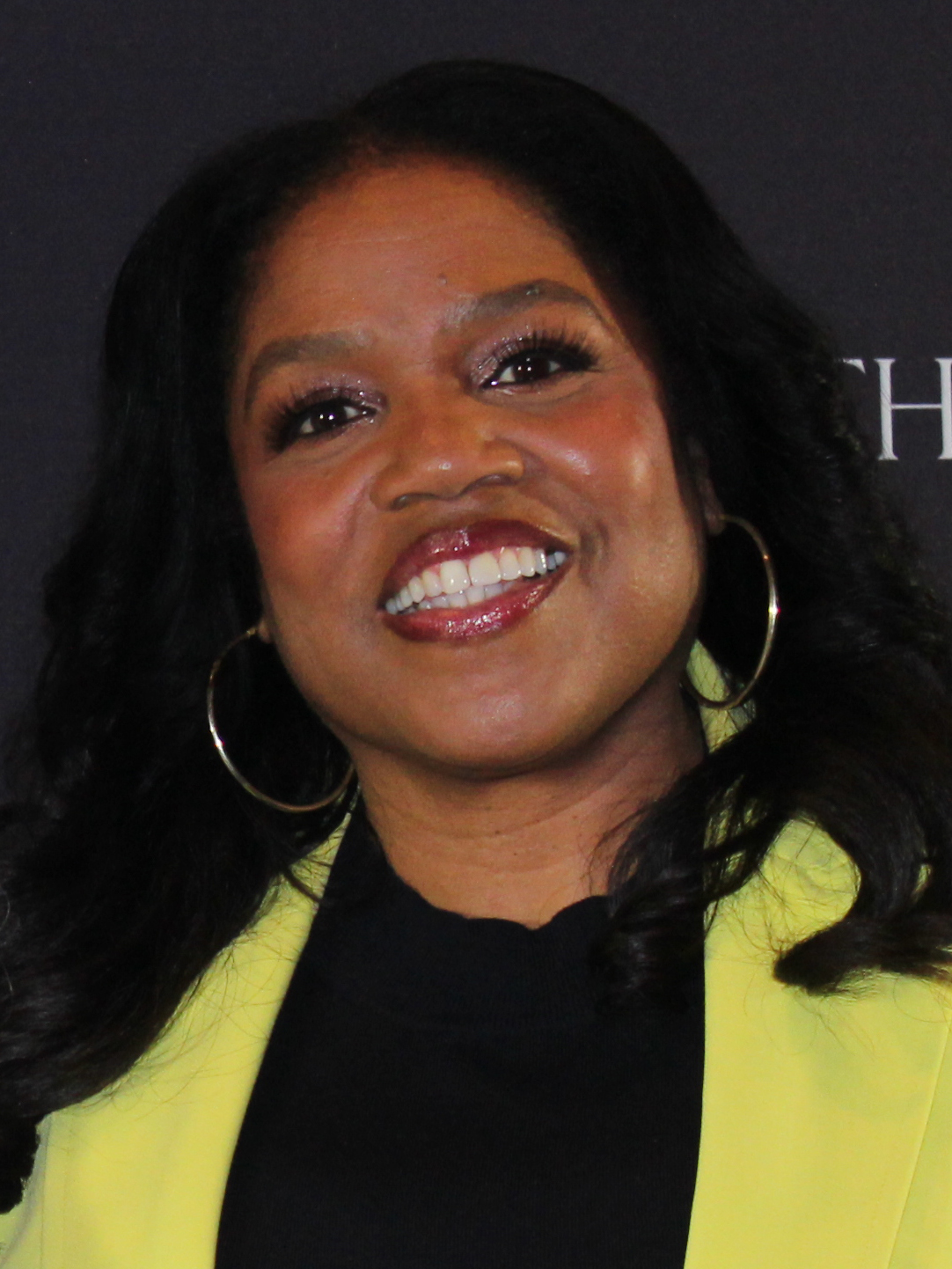
Sheila Ducksworth, president of the CBS Studios/NAACP Venture, serves as one of the serial's executive producers.

On February 23, 2024, it was reported Michele Val Jean was departing The Bold and the Beautiful after having written for the CBS soap opera for 12 years. The following month, it announced she was developing a new daytime soap opera that would follow the lives of a wealthy Black family. It will be produced by a joint venture of CBS Studios and the NAACP, along with Procter & Gamble Studios. Val Jean will serve as head writer and showrunner, and will also executive produce alongside Sheila Ducksworth, Leon Russell, Derrick Johnson and Kimberly Doebereiner. On March 15, 2024, it was reported that the series was under "accelerated development". On April 15 of the same year, it was reported CBS ordered the serial, originally titled The Gates, to series for debut in January 2025. It was later announced the serial would launch "in place" of The Talk. (Note: On December 5, 2024, CBS announced reruns of The Price Is Right would air in the 2 p.m. ET (UTC−05:00) time slot each weekday from December 23, 2024, to February 14, 2025; reruns of the primetime reboot of Hollywood Squares received a one-week "special" encore of episodes from January 27 to January 31, 2025. From February 17 to February 21, Beyond the Gates: Welcome to the Neighborhood aired in replacement of The Price Is Right from 2 p.m. to 2:30 p.m. ET, with repeat episodes of The Bold and the Beautiful airing during the second half-hour.)

Beyond the Gates is the first American daytime soap opera to feature a primarily African-American cast since the 1989–1991 NBC soap Generations, which—aside from being Val Jean's first scriptwriting job—was the first serial to feature a Black family from its inception, and to focus primarily on a family of ethnic minorities. It is also the first new daytime soap opera on an American broadcast television network since Passions on NBC in 1999, the first daytime soap opera from Procter & Gamble to debut since Texas in 1980, the first daytime soap opera to premiere on CBS since The Bold and the Beautiful in 1987, and the first daytime soap opera owned by CBS.

In July 2024, it was reported soap opera writing and production veterans Robert Guza Jr. and Julie Hanan Carruthers had joined the serial as executive producers, alongside Val Jean. Skyy Sandifer, credited for her work as a script coordinator on Ambitions was announced as a writer's assistant for the serial the following month, along with reports the writers' room had been "set" and would include "some familiar names to the genre." On November 15, the writing team was announced. Guza Jr. was named co-head writer, alongside Val Jean. Susan Dansby and Michael Montgomery were named as script editor and continuity producer, respectively. Jazmen Darnell Brown, Cheryl L. Davis, Lynn Martin, Danielle Paige, and Judy Tate were named scriptwriters; Sara A. Bibel, Ron Carlivati, Christopher Dunn, Gregori J. Martin, and Teresa Zimmerman were named breakdown writers.

In January 2025, Ducksworth revealed to Entertainment Weekly she spearheaded the serial's creation, as part of a "four-year effort to break new ground in the genre." "We wanted to have a show on the air that spoke to a different side of the Black experience. Not the downtrodden, not the ghettoized. We wanted to show rich, Black people doing messy things," Val Jean told the publication, via Zoom with Ducksworth, the latter of whom called the green-lighting of the serial "revolutionary". In a February 2025 feature in The New York Times, Ducksworth remarked it had been a "30-year passion, the point of getting this made." CBS chief executive and president George Cheeks believed there was "still an audience" for soap operas, which led to the decision to move forward with the serial.

In May 2025, CBS renewed the serial for an additional season, through the 2025 to 2026 daytime television season. In their press release, CBS cited the serial's continued ratings success, both in comparison to its predecessor The Talk and its direct competitor General Hospital, stating that since its debut, Beyond the Gates "has improved the time period +48% in broadcast viewership. Additionally, Beyond the Gates, is up +67% in multiplatform viewership from last years' time period and beats ABC's General Hospital by +7& among W25-54 on broadcast." That same month, Soap Opera Network announced Guza Jr had exited as co-executive producer and co-head writer; Tracey Thomson was named as his successor as a co-executive producer. In June 2025, Thomson was also named co-head writer; it was also reported Gregori J. Martin would depart, to focus on the tenth season of The Bay. The following month, Carlivati announced his exit, citing his decision to pursue "other projects". Other exits include Dunn and Lynn Martin; Brown, who was previously believed to be exiting, announced he would remain with the soap. Val Jean revealed the exits of Guza Jr, Carlivati and Dunn were amicable, as their roles were to assist in launching the serial.

In April 2026, the serial was renewed for two additional years, through the 2027 to 2028 daytime television season. CBS announced their decision at their fall presentation on April 15.

=== Casting ===
Cast of Beyond the Gates

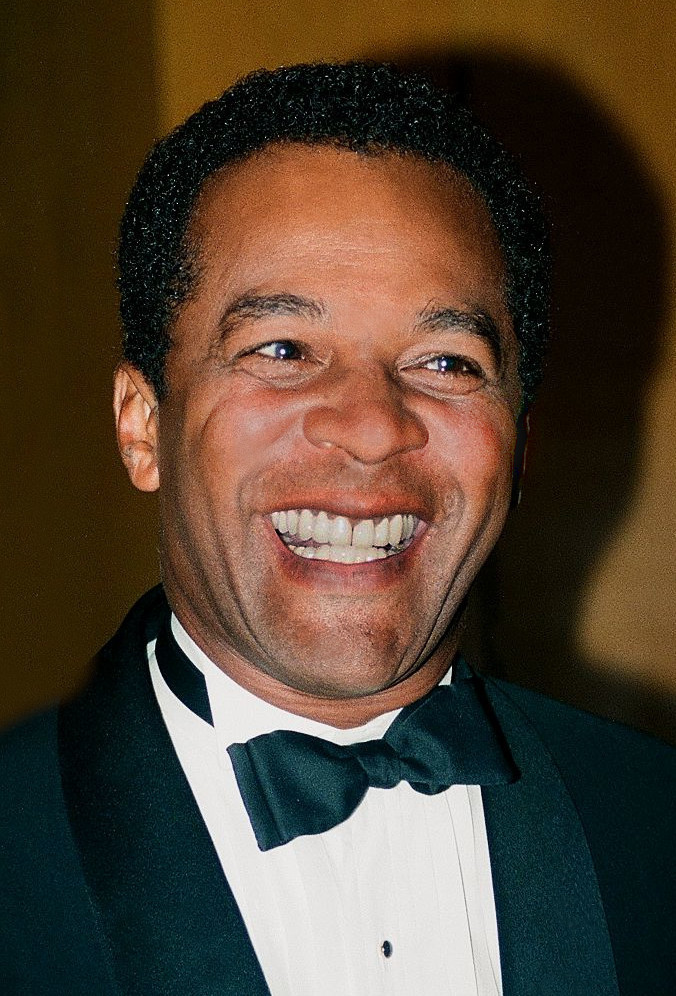
Clifton Davis

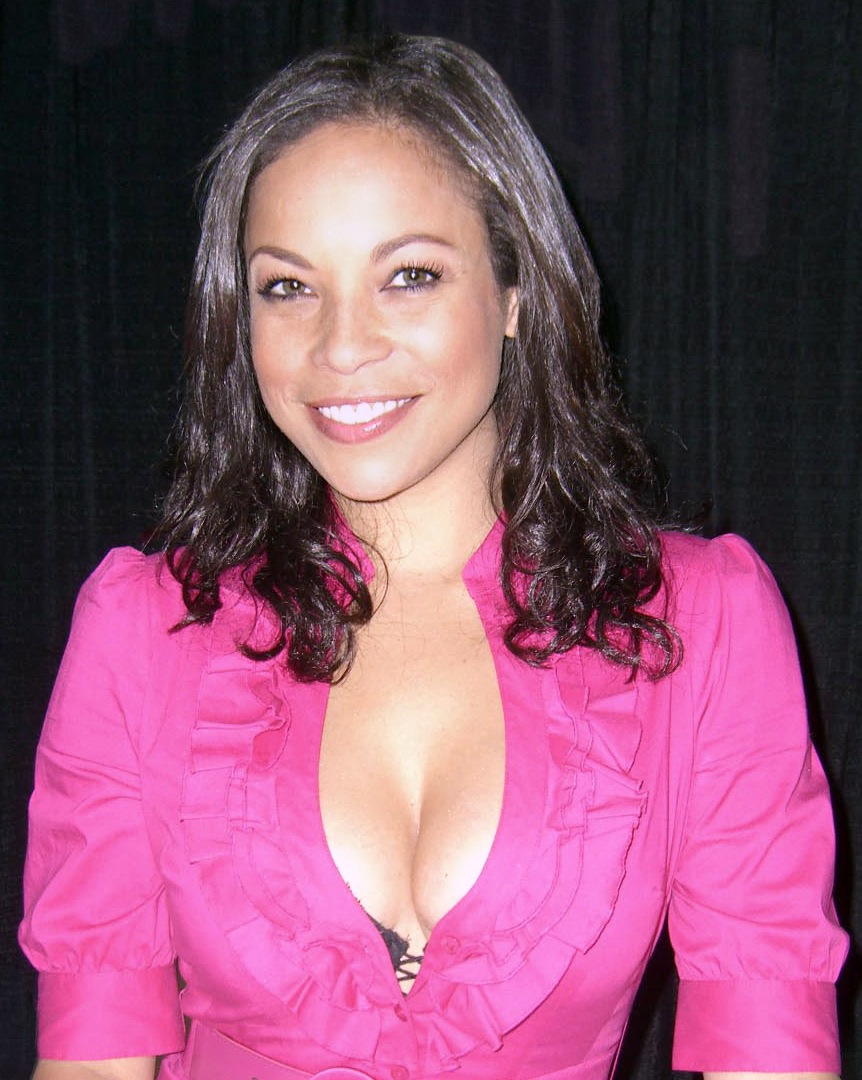
Daphnée Duplaix

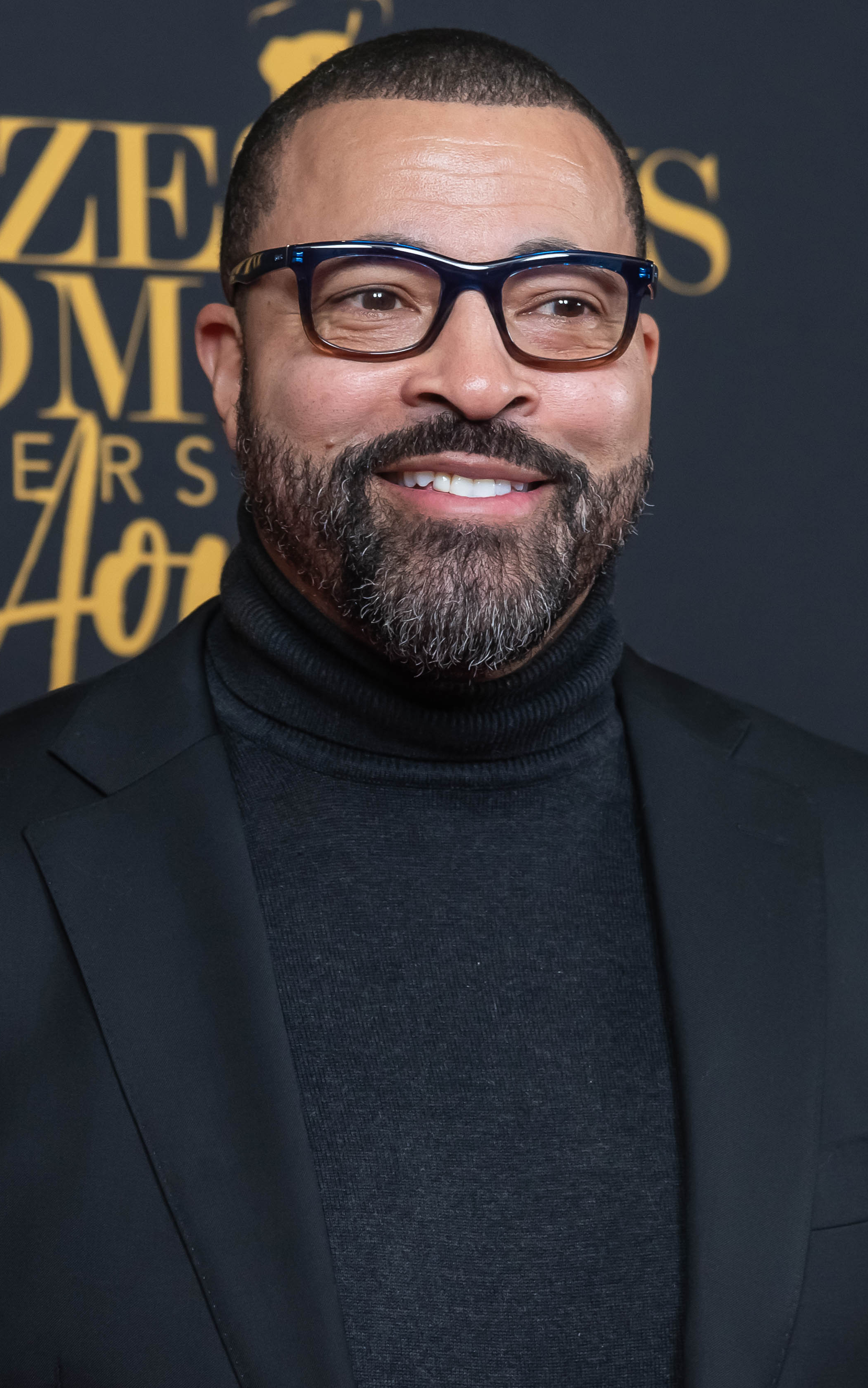
Timon Kyle Durrett

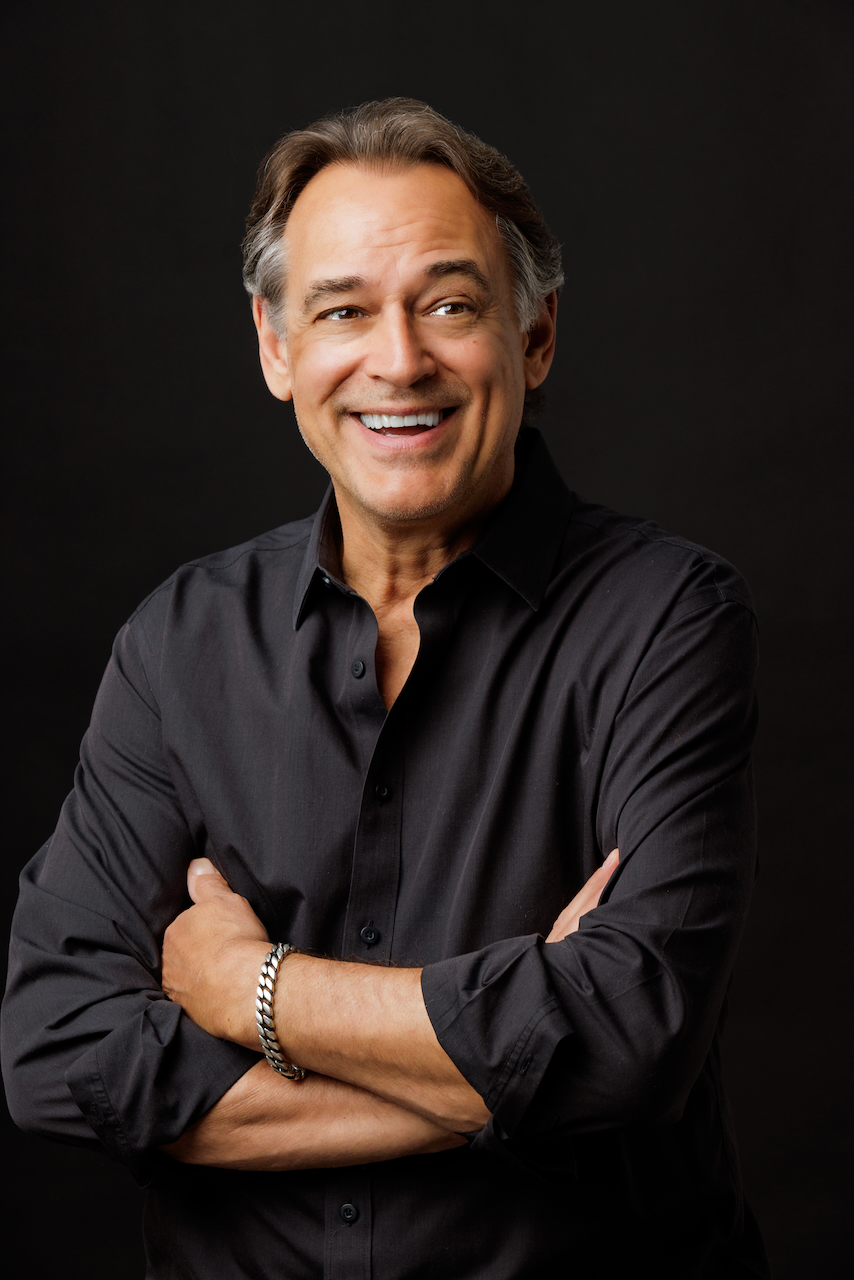
Jon Lindstrom

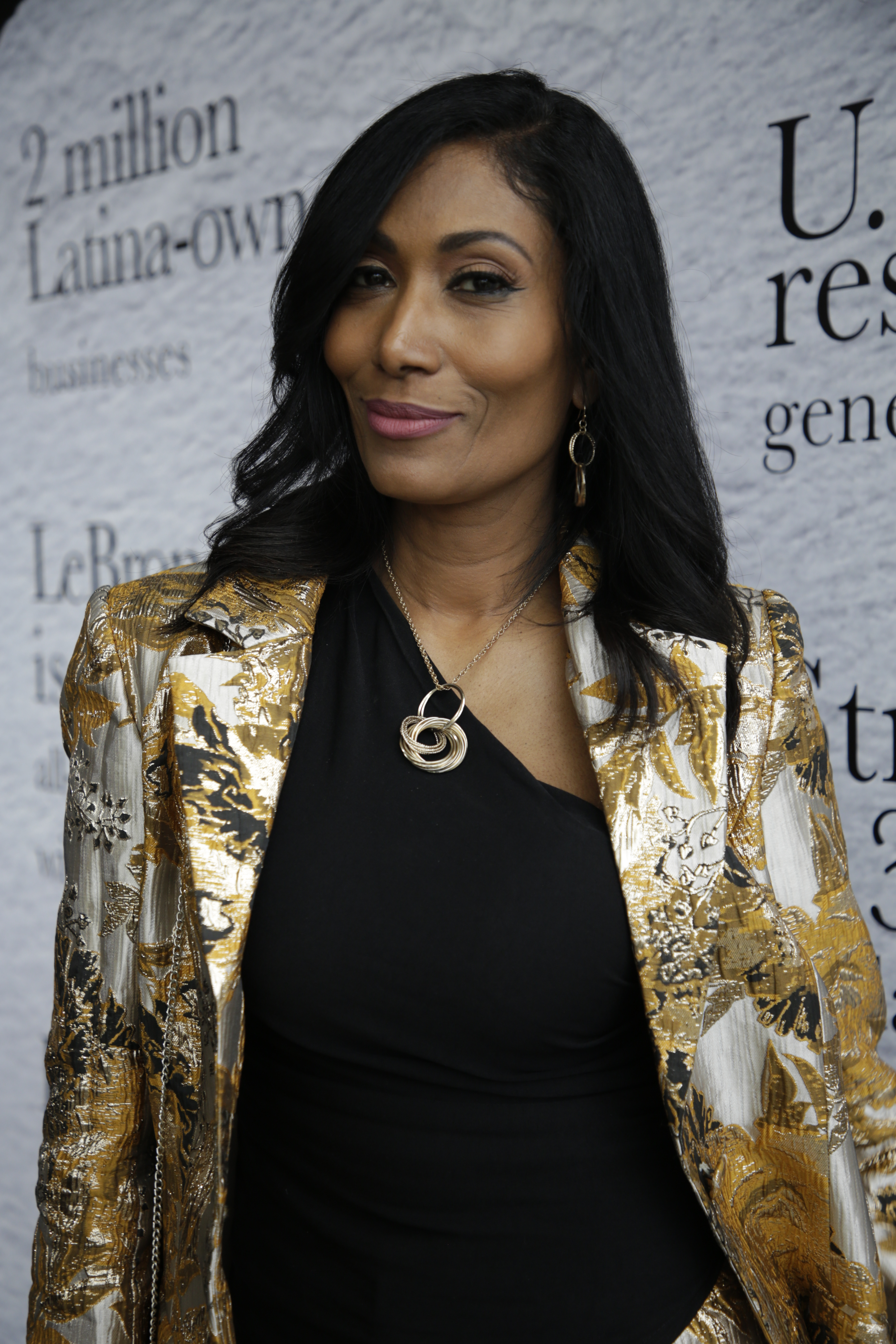
Trisha Mann-Grant

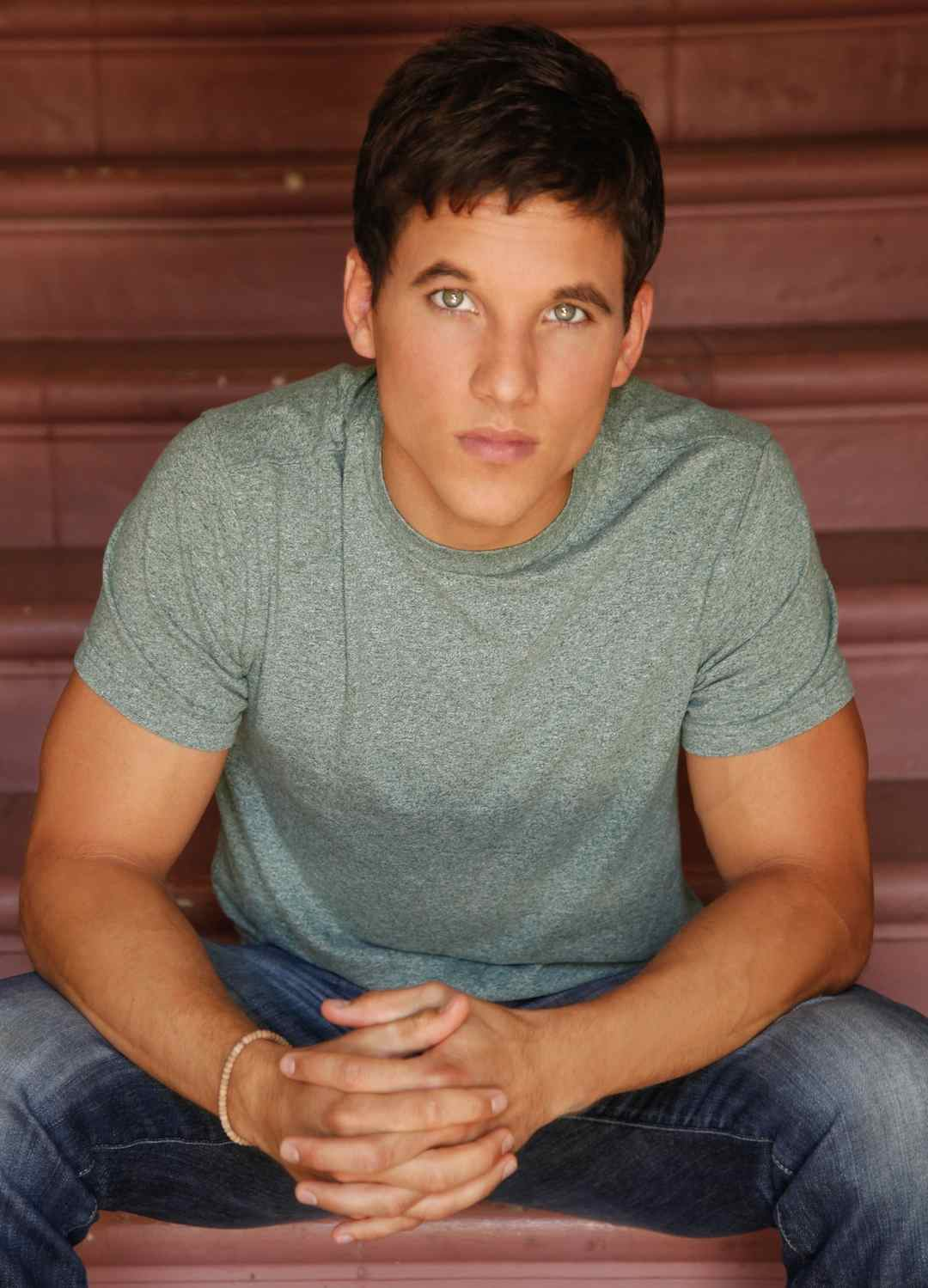
Mike Manning

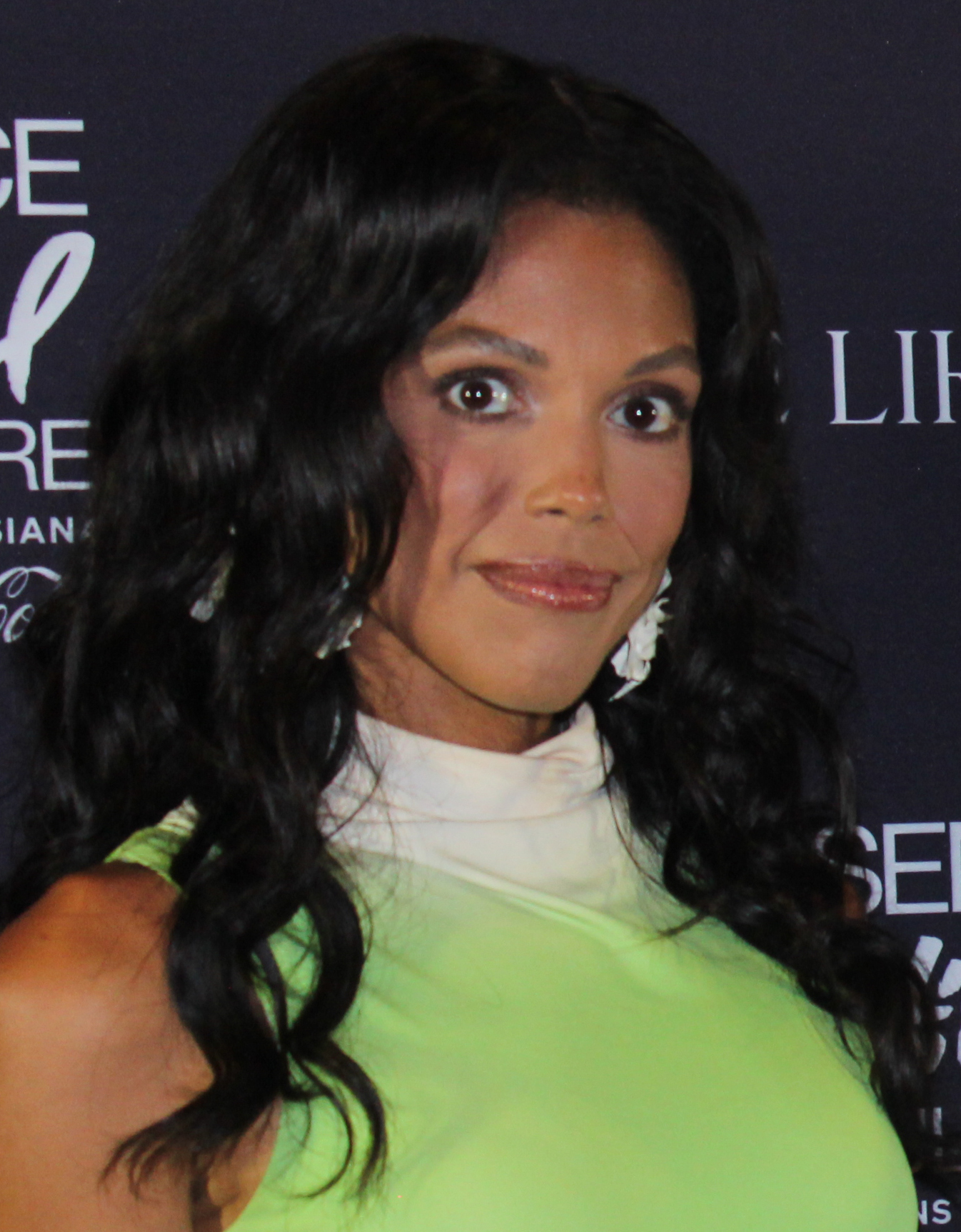
Karla Mosley

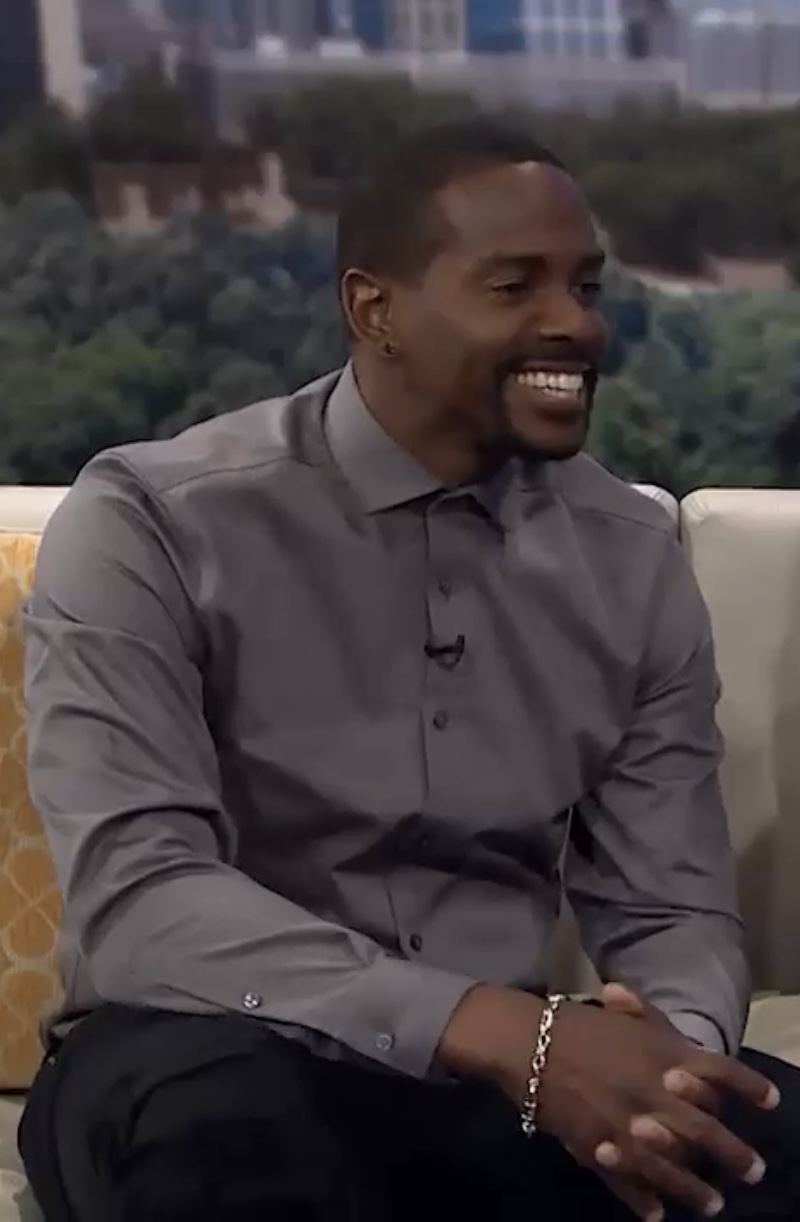
Keith D. Robinson

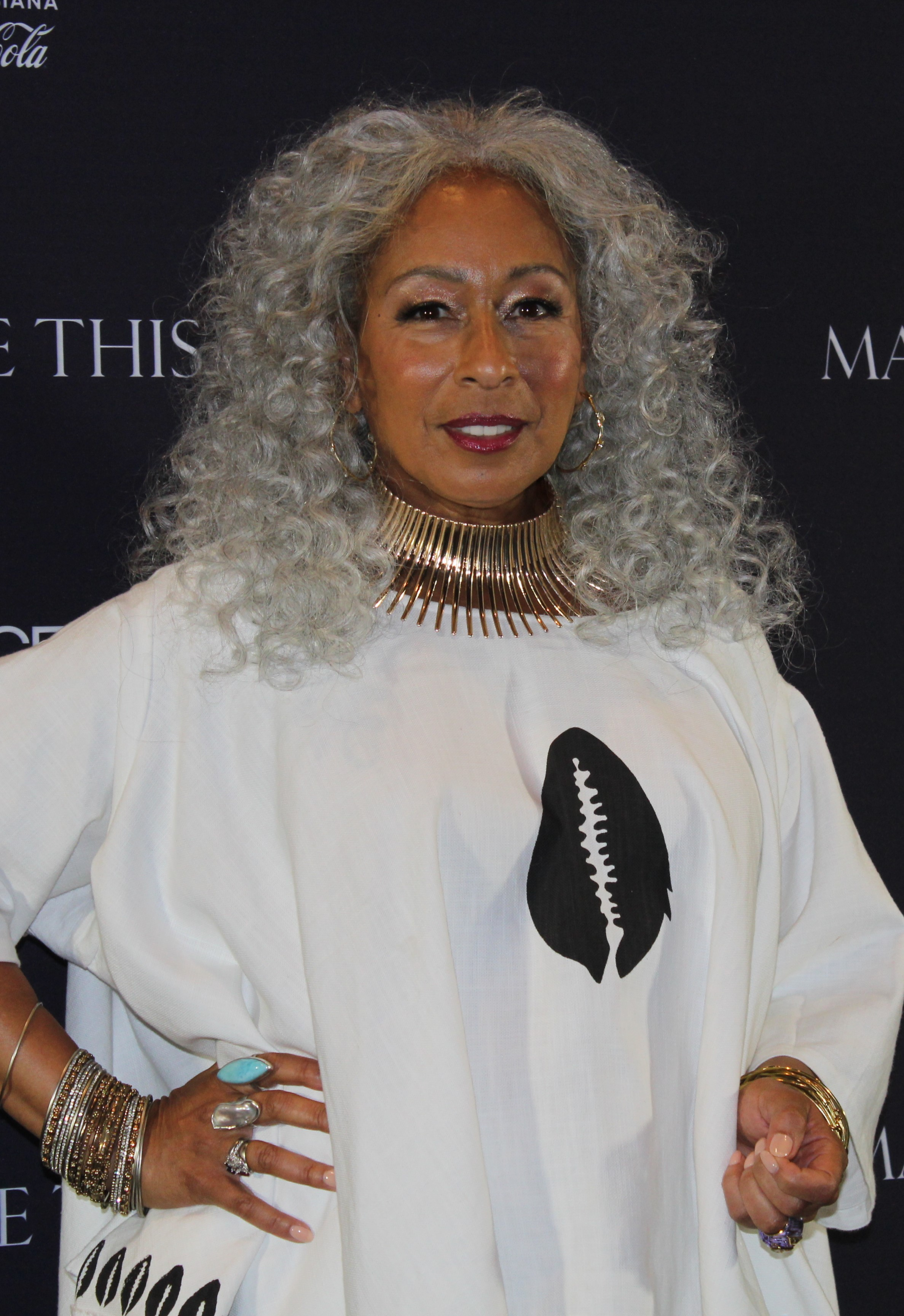
Tamara Tunie

The names and descriptions of nine series regular roles to-be cast were revealed by TV Insider on August 15, 2024, with a note all actors "must" reside in Atlanta. The following month, the names and descriptions of six additional character were revealed.

On September 19, 2024, the first three castings were announced. Tunie was cast as Anita Dupree, a "once famous singer who worked hard to succeed and raised two daughters with her now-retired senator husband." Duplaix and Mosley were cast as Anita's daughters, Nicole Dupree Richardson and Dani Dupree, respectively. Nicole is described as a "high-achieving and competitive philanthropist and psychiatrist, and exudes warmth, empathy and compassion", while Dani is described as a "former model turned momager who gave up her career for love." On October 4, 2024, three additional character breakdowns were revealed: one series regular and two recurring.

Ten additional castings were announced on October 25, 2024, with familiar connections to the formerly-mentioned castings: the Richardsons, the Hamiltons and the Thomases. Johnson was cast as Ted Richardson, Nicole's husband and a "brilliant plastic surgeon with an ultra-exclusive private practice". Claybon and Muhammad were cast as Nicole and Ted's children, Martin Richardson and Katherine "Kat" Richardson, respectively. Martin is gay and a congressman, who lives outside of the gated community with his husband and their two adopted children. He is noted for his "ambition to be the first openly gay Black President". Kat is described as "indulged," "spoiled," "entitled" and "dismissive". Rounding out the Richardson family is Freeman as Andre Richardson, described as the "sophisticated nephew of Ted Richardson," who "tragically lost his parents in a plane crash and inherited a double fortune," allowing him to pursue his career at a photographer.

Durrett was cast as Dani's ex-husband, Bill Hamilton. Described as a "charismatic and calculated criminal defense attorney," Bill and Dani share two children: Naomi Hamilton Hawthorne and Chelsea Hamilton. Prepetit and Mantilla were cast as Naomi and Chelsea, respectively. Goings was cast as Bill's "intelligent" fiancée Hayley Lawson, who works as a paralegal at Bill's law firm. Mann-Grant and Michelle were cast as mother-daughter duo Dana "Leslie" Thomas and Eva Thomas, respectively. Additional castings, rounding out the main cast were announced four days later. Broadway stage legend Davis was cast as Dupree family patriarch, Vernon. A retired Senator, Vernon is described as "gentle, humble and generous". Hordges was cast in the role of Naomi's husband, Jacob Hawthorne. Manning was cast as Martin's husband, Bradley "Smitty" Smith; the names of their teenage children—not cast at the time of the announcement—were revealed as Tyrell and Samantha. Jacob was cast in the role of Naomi's best friend Ashley Morgan, a nurse at Washington, D.C.'s Garland Memorial Hospital. Gavin was cast as Derek Baldwin, a "devoted" firefighter, in a relationship with Ashley. Buglioli was cast as Nicole's best friend and Dani's neighbor, Vanessa McBride, a "high-end real estate agency owner". Alegria was cast as Tomas "Tom" Navarro, a "handsome and confident young attorney" who works at Bill's law firm, and has his eyes on Kat Richardson. The Real Housewives of Potomac star Karen Huger and Entertainment Tonight host Nischelle Turner made cameo appearances on the serial.

On October 30, 2024, an open casting notice was put out for bartending and wait staff roles. Other roles and breakdowns were revealed, via TV Insider. In February 2025, a competition was announced; production was inviting eligible students from HBCUs in Georgia to participate in a competition to win a chance for a walk-on role. That same month, it was announced Lindstrom and McClain had joined the cast as Joey Armstrong and Pamela Curtis, respectively. In March 2025, it was announced Robinson would replace Johnson as Ted Richardson, as the serial's first recast. In July 2025, it was revealed The Young and the Restless' Bryton James would crossover as his character Devon Winters; his appearance aired on August 11. Gizelle Bryant and Wendy Osefo of The Real Housewives of Potomac also guest-starred.

In September 2025, it was announced David Lami Friebe was cast in the role of Izaiah Hawthorne, Jacob's (Hordges) brother. A crossover with The Bold and the Beautiful, featuring Thorsten Kaye's Ridge Forrester, was announced that same month. The following month, it was announced Greg Vaughan had joined the cast in an undisclosed role; he debuted in the role of Kial Rollins on December 8. Kenny Lattimore appeared during the December 30 episode. That same month, it was announced Jordi Vilasuso had joined the cast. He made his debut as Grayson Perez on January 13, 2026.

On January 27, 2026, it was announced Cecelia Specht had joined the cast as Lia Whitmore; her 20-episode engagement is set to air from February 13 to May 26 of the same year. That same day, a second crossover with The Young and the Restless was announced. Along with James' return, Peter Bergman (Jack Abbott), Eric Braeden (Victor Newman), Michael Mealor (Kyle Abbott), Melissa Ordway (Abby Newman), and Susan Walters (Diane Jenkins) were announced to appear. The event, described as "historic" and "landmark", will air from June 9 to June 12, 2026. In April of the same year, it was announced Ashley Jones had joined the cast as Heather Armstrong. Tabitha Brown and Kandi Burruss will appear as Tia Allen and Kalista Kilroy, respectively, on the October 22 episode. That same month, it was announced James would again appear on the soap, this time alongside Christel Khalil (Lily Winters). They appeared during the November 4 episode.

=== Filming and location ===
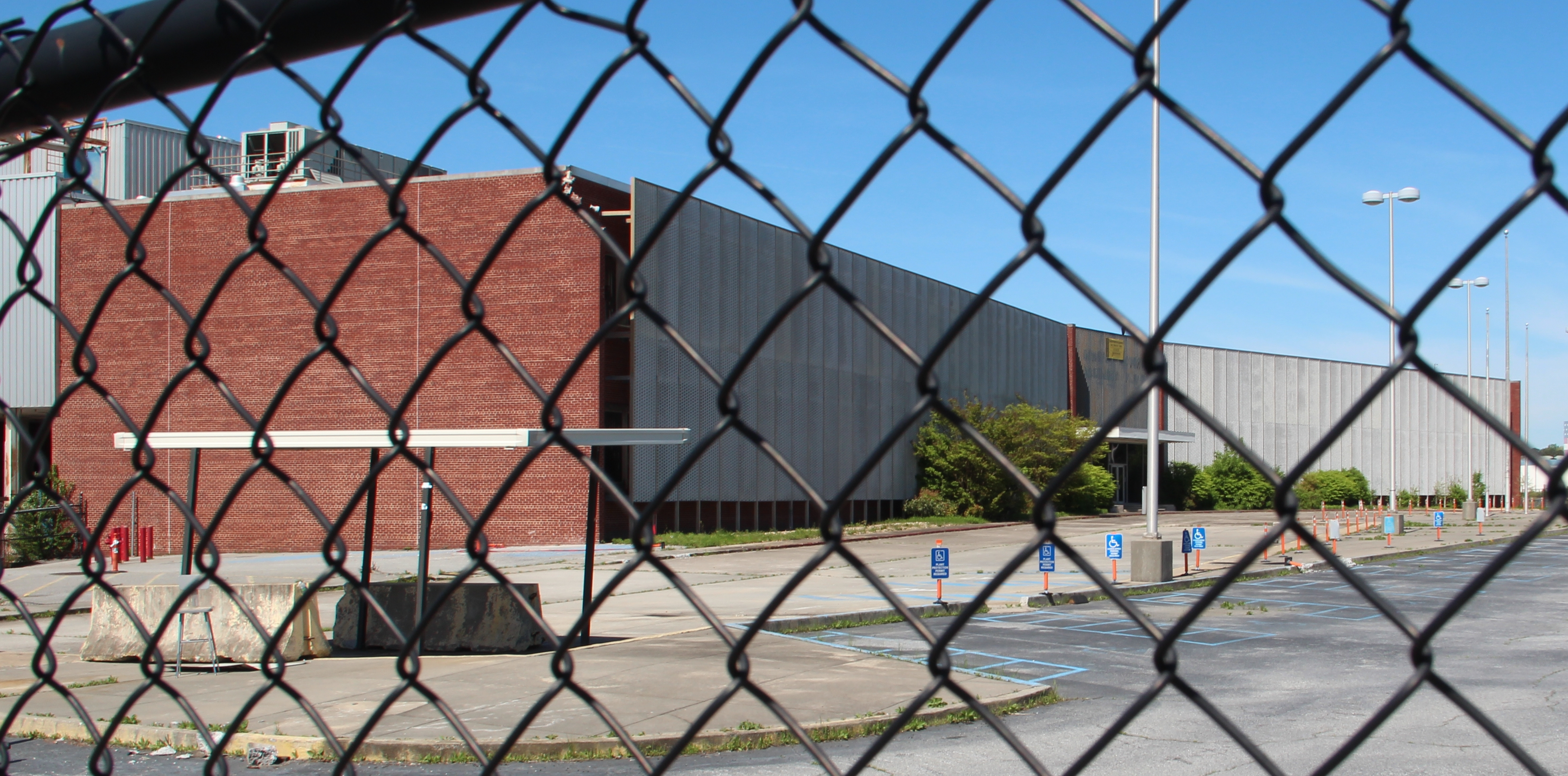
Doraville Assembly (pictured in 2015), where Beyond the Gates films

In August 2024, it was revealed Beyond the Gates would film at Assembly Studios in Atlanta, Georgia. The following month, it was reported production would begin November 4 of the same year. On October 30, 2024, cast and crew gathered on set for a ribbon-cutting ceremony and table read-through of the first episode. Cast also contributed signed scripts and letters to their future selves, which were placed in a time capsule and encased on set, to be opened in the future. Production on Beyond the Gates began on November 1.

On January 19, 2025, production was featured on CBS News Sunday Morning. During the seven-minute segment, it was revealed production features a crew of over 200 individuals, including production designer Bruton Jones, who oversaw the creation of 27 sets and Wankaya Hinkson, who oversees the hair department. Both Jones and Hinkson, respectively, shared their thoughts on "bringing the authentic experience and aesthetic of prominent African Americans living in PG County to life."

== Scheduling ==
=== Broadcast ===
Beyond the Gates premiered on February 24, 2025, at 2 p.m. ET (UTC−05:00) on CBS, with live streaming and on-demand access via Paramount+. On December 16, 2024, a first-look teaser was released by CBS. On January 25 of the following year, Essence published the full-length trailer for the serial. TVLine published another trailer six days later, introducing several characters from the serial. On February 11, 2025, CBS announced a week-long Entertainment Tonight special, Beyond the Gates: Welcome to the Neighborhood, hosted by Kevin Frazier and Sheryl Underwood. The five half-hour specials, which aired the week of February 17, featured "extended footage" from the cast's first read-through, as well as other behind-the-scenes content leading up to the serial's premiere. BET aired primetime and weekend afternoon encores of the series, consisting of the first ten episodes, for a limited run from March 10 to 23, 2025. The serial aired its 100th episode on July 29, 2025. That August, Pluto TV launched a free ad-supported streaming television (FAST) channel focused on the serial.

During the 2024 to 2025 daytime television schedule, select weeks of encore presentations occurred. The first taking place the week of June 30, 2025. In response, Val Jean revealed she did not know why the network chose to air encores instead of new episodes, citing the decision was "above [her] pay grade". Original episodes resumed July 7. A second week of encore presentations occurred during the week of September 1 of the same year, with new episodes to resume on September 8. A third pre-emption occurred two months later, with plans to re-air episodes that originally aired in August of that same year. In response, Mosley revealed the encore presentations were likely due to the serial producing 200 episodes, 50 less than the standard 250 that soaps standardly produce, which allowed them some "wiggle room" to match other American soap productions; she further stated plans to produce 238 episodes during the 2025 to 2026 schedule and plans for 250 during the 2026 to 2027 schedule. On October 16, 2025, it was announced two holiday-centric episodes would air on December 24 and December 30.

On January 2, 2026, the first 200 episodes of the serial were removed from Paramount+, which led to backlash from the audience. Four days later, the episodes were restored. On January 19, a special episode titled "Inside Fairmont Crest" aired. Taped in November 2025, the episode featured several cast members discussing the serial's first 200 episodes, along with a behind-the-scenes look at the production of the serial. On March 5, BET began rebroadcasting the serial from the very beginning, as part of a three-hour programming block known as "Thank Goodness It's Gates" (a.k.a. "T.G.I.G.").

=== International broadcast ===
Beyond the Gates was simulcast on CHCH-DT, an independent television station in Hamilton, Ontario, Canada, at 2 p.m. ET, from February 24 to August 29, 2025. In May 2025, CHCH started airing episodes one day before they were broadcast in the United States. After 18 episodes, the airing schedule aligned with the American broadcasts. From September 8 to December 16, 2025, Beyond the Gates was simulcast on CTV Drama Channel, with next-day streaming available via Crave. On January 5, 2026, Bell Media transferred the serial from CTV Drama Channel to E!, following the cessation of its broadcast on the former channel during the holiday season. The channel simulcasts the episodes at 3 p.m. ET, with the missing episodes being uploaded to Crave.

== Accolades ==
List of accolades
Organization	Year	Category	Recipient(s)	Result	Ref.
Daytime Emmy Awards	2026	Outstanding Daytime Drama Series	Beyond the Gates	Nominated	
Daytime Emmy Awards	2026	Outstanding Lead Actress in a Drama Series	Karla Mosley (Dani Dupree)	Nominated	
Daytime Emmy Awards	2026	Outstanding Lead Actress in a Drama Series	Tamara Tunie (Anita Williams Dupree)	Won	
Daytime Emmy Awards	2026	Outstanding Supporting Actress in a Drama Series	Trisha Mann-Grant (Leslie Thomas)	Nominated	
Daytime Emmy Awards	2026	Outstanding Supporting Actor in a Drama Series	Timon Kyle Durrett (Bill Hamilton)	Nominated	
Daytime Emmy Awards	2026	Outstanding Supporting Actor in a Drama Series	Mike Manning (Bradley "Smitty" Smith)	Nominated	
Daytime Emmy Awards	2026	Outstanding Emerging Talent in a Daytime Drama Series	Ambyr Michelle (Eva Thomas)	Won	
Daytime Emmy Awards	2026	Outstanding Emerging Talent in a Daytime Drama Series	Arielle Prepetit (Naomi Hamilton Hawthorne)	Nominated	
Daytime Emmy Awards	2026	Outstanding Guest Performer in a Drama Series	Jasmine Burke (June Hughes)	Nominated	
Daytime Emmy Awards	2026	Outstanding Drama Series Writing Team	Beyond the Gates	Nominated	
Daytime Emmy Awards	2026	Outstanding Music Direction and Composition for a Daytime Program	Beyond the Gates (Episode 103)	Nominated	
Daytime Emmy Awards	2026	Outstanding Technical Direction and Video for a Daytime Program	Beyond the Gates (Episode 104)	Nominated	
Daytime Emmy Awards	2026	Outstanding Lighting Direction for a Daytime Program	Beyond the Gates (Episode 104)	Won	
Daytime Emmy Awards	2026	Outstanding Hairstyling and Makeup for a Daytime Program	Beyond the Gates (Episode 103)	Won	
Daytime Emmy Awards	2026	Outstanding Casting for a Daytime Program	Beyond the Gates	Nominated	
Essence Black Women in Hollywood Awards	2026	Essies Choice Award	Beyond the Gates	Won	
NAACP Image Awards	2026	Outstanding Drama Series	Beyond the Gates	Nominated	
NAACP Image Awards	2026	Outstanding Hairstyling	Wankala L. Hinkson	Nominated	
Set Decorators Society of America Awards	2024–2025	Best Achievement in Décor/Design of a Daytime Series	Cynthia Slagter, Bruton Jones	Nominated	
Set Decorators Society of America Awards	2025–2026	Best Achievement in Décor/Design of a Daytime Series	Cynthia Slagter, Bruton Jones	Nominated	
Writers Guild of America Awards	2026	Television: Daytime Drama	Sara A. Bibel, Jazmen Darnell Brown, Ron Carlivati, Susan Dansby, Cheryl L. Davis, Christopher Dunn, Robert Guza Jr., Gregori J. Martin, Lynn Martin, Danielle Paige, Judy Tate, Michele Val Jean, and Teresa Zimmerman	Nominated	

== See also ==
- CBS Daytime – Daytime programming block on CBS
- List of LGBTQ characters in soap operas
- List of programs broadcast by CBS
- List of soap operas
- Television in the United States
