= Barbara Garshman =

Barbara Garshman is an American television producer, writer and executive. She holds an MA in Theater Arts - TV from UCLA. She is a former NBC Director of Prime Time Development-East Coast where she helped develop the mini-series as a new dramatic form, presenting over 100 hours of on-air programming, as well as made for television movies, sitcoms and dramatic series. She received five Daytime Emmy Award nominations as Supervising Producer of CBS Daytime's Guiding Light. After leaving GL in 1993, she devoted her time to writing for Days of Our Lives, Another World, and a primetime dramatic pilot, Connections. She worked for ABC Daytime as a consultant where she developed writers for their existing serials and conceived new dramatic forms for daytime television.

Garshman currently runs a consulting business.

== Sources ==
- Jackson Free Press: MWG
- MWG 2007 P.L.A.N.S. Writers Conference
- Media Bistro
- The Peoples Improv Theater
- New York Women In Film & Television
