= Pride: The Series =

- Created by: Dorell Anthony
- Written by: Dorell Anthony; Brandon Polanco; Jennifer Wilmeth; Terissa Kelton; Ashley Mitchell; Whitney Hoy; Maxwel Martinez; Scott C. Sickles; Maryan Myika Day
- Directed by: Brandon Polanco; Michael V. Pomarico
- Starring: Dorell Anthony; Ashley Mitchell; Braden Bradley; Adam Andrew Rios
- Country of origin: United States
- Original language: English
- No. of seasons: 3

Production
- Executive producers: Dorell Anthony; Brandon Polanco; Jennifer Wilmeth; Whitney Hoy; Terissa Kelton; Ashley Mitchell; John W. Hyde
- Producers: Braden Bradley; Megan Montfort; Adam Andrew Rios; Vincent De Paul; Sonia Blangiardo
- Cinematography: CJ Baker
- Production companies: 3 of a Kind Productions; Rehab Entertainment; Pride: The Series, LLC

Original release
- Network: Vimeo
- Release: 2013 – present
- Network: Amazon Prime Video

Pride: The Series is a digital drama, created by writer and actor Dorell Anthony, premiering in 2013. The drama streams on Amazon Prime Video.

== Cast ==
=== Primary cast ===
- Dorell Anthony (2013–present) as Kai Williams
- Ashley Mitchell (2013–present) as Trina Williams
- Braden Bradley (2013–present) as Travis Dalton
- Adam Andrew Rios (2013–present) as Adam Garza/Sheneeda Buffet

=== Supporting cast ===
- Whitney Hoy (2014–present) as Lana Brixton
- Lauren B. Martin (2014–present) as Angela Torres
- Ilene Kristen (2014–present) as Professor Eleanor Brixton
- Vincent De Paul (2016–present) as Robert Newman
- Tony D. Head (2016–present) as George Williams
- Clayton Berger (2013–present) as Chad Roberts
- Aaron Mathias (2014–present) as Garret Fitzpatrick
- Scott Turner Schofield (2016–present) as Dr. Liev Hart
- Melissa Disney (2016–present) as Nancy Dalton
- Jared Tettey (2016–present) as Harrison Stone
- Corey Camperchioli (2014–present) as Charlie Stevens
- Scott Michael Salame (2013–present) as Owen Roberts
- Terissa Kelton (2014–present) as Riley Heller
- Jonathan Rentler (2014) as Dealer 1
- Forest Van Dyke (2014) as Kenny
- Jonathan Villanueva (2014–present) as Luis Torres #2
- Brandon Polanco (2013–2014) as Luis Torres #1

=== Special guest star ===
- Tyler Wallach (2014) as Himself

== Series overview ==
=== Episodes ===
==== Season 1 (2013) ====
| No. overall | No. in season | Title | Directed by | Written by | Original release date |
|---|---|---|---|---|---|
| 1 | 1 | "Opening Image" | Brandon Polanco | Dorell Anthony, Brandon Polanco, Jennifer Sara Wilmeth | TBA |
| 2 | 2 | "Setup" | Brandon Polanco | Dorell Anthony, Brandon Polanco, Jennifer Sara Wilmeth | TBA |
| 3 | 3 | "Catalyst" | Brandon Polanco | Dorell Anthony, Brandon Polanco, Jennifer Sara Wilmeth | TBA |
| 4 | 4 | "Debate" | Brandon Polanco | Dorell Anthony, Brandon Polanco, Jennifer Sara Wilmeth | TBA |
| 5 | 5 | "Break Into Two" | Brandon Polanco | Dorell Anthony, Brandon Polanco, Jennifer Sara Wilmeth | TBA |
| 6 | 6 | "All Is Lost" | Brandon Polanco | Dorell Anthony, Brandon Polanco, Jennifer Sara Wilmeth | TBA |
| 7 | 7 | "Dark Night of the Soul" | Brandon Polanco | Dorell Anthony, Brandon Polanco, Jennifer Sara Wilmeth | TBA |

==== Season 2 ====
| No. overall | No. in season | Title | Directed by | Written by | Original release date |
|---|---|---|---|---|---|
| 8 | 1 | "#ohlawd" | Michael V. Pomarico | Dorell Anthony, Maxwel Martinez, Whitney Hoy, Ashely Mitchell, Terissa Kelton | TBA |
| 9 | 2 | "#staytrue" | Michael V. Pomarico | Dorell Anthony, Maxwel Martinez, Whitney Hoy, Ashely Mitchell, Terissa Kelton | TBA |
| 10 | 3 | "#pointofnocomingdown" | Michael V. Pomarico | Dorell Anthony, Maxwel Martinez, Whitney Hoy, Ashely Mitchell, Terissa Kelton | TBA |

== Production ==
Dorell Anthony initially created Pride: The Series in 2013, with executive producers Brandon Polanco and Jennifer Wilmeth, and core cast members Ashley Mitchell, Adam Andrew Rios, and Braden Bradley.

Ilene Kristen (Ryan's Hope, One Life to Live, General Hospital) and Lauren B. Martin (As the World Turns, Another World (TV series), Anacostia) joined the cast as special guest stars for the first season. Following the first season, the show took a hiatus to make changes behind the scenes. Polanco and Wilmeth departed the series and Mitchell was upgraded to executive producer, with Rios and Bradley serving as associate producers alongside Vincent de Paul and Megan Montfort. Rehab Entertainment, owned by John W. Hyde and Terissa Kelton joined as executive producers with Kelton portraying a new supporting character, Riley. Michael V. Pomarico (All My Children, multi nominated director) joined as series director. Sonia Blangiardo (All My Children, Days of Our Lives, Tainted Dreams) joined as consulting producer.

As of June 2019, Scott C. Sickles (One Life to Live, General Hospital) was announced as head writer of the show taking the series in a different direction more in line of what Anthony envisioned with Maryam Myika Day (SMARTASS, MOUNTAIN HIGH) as a writer.

The 3rd season is currently in pre-production.

== Awards and recognition ==
| Year | Award | Category | Individual | Result | Ref. |
|---|---|---|---|---|---|
| 2017 | Los Angeles Independent Film Fest | Best LGBT Short | | Won | |
| 2017 | 8th Indie Series Awards | Best Supporting Actress (Drama) | Lauren B. Martin | Nominated | |
| 2017 | 8th Indie Series Awards | Best Guest Actor (Drama) | Scott Turner Schofield | Nominated | |
| 2017 | 8th Indie Series Awards | Best Guest Actor (Drama) | Tony D. Head | Nominated | |
| 2017 | 8th Indie Series Awards | Best Guest Actress (Drama) | Melissa Disney | Nominated | |
| 2017 | 8th Indie Series Awards | Best Guest Actress (Drama) | Whitney Hoy | Nominated | |
| 2017 | 8th Indie Series Awards | Best Production Design | Scott Michael Salame | Nominated | |
| 2017 | Los Angeles CinFest | Semi-Finalist | | | |
| 2017 | Aroha Film Festival | Best New Media | | Won | |
| 2018 | Glow Television and Web Series Festival | Official Selection | | | |
| 2018 | Baltimore New Media Film Fest | Best LGBT Series | | Won | |
| 2019 | Capital City Web Awards | Best Ensemble | | Won | |
| 2019 | Capital City Web Awards | Best Series | | Nominated | |
| 2019 | Capital City Web Awards | Best Actor | Dorell Anthony | Nominated | |
| 2019 | Capital City Web Awards | Best Actress | Ashley Mitchell | Nominated | |
| 2019 | Capital City Web Awards | Supporting Actor | Adam Andrew Rios | Nominated | |
| 2019 | Capital City Web Awards | Supporting Actor | Braden Bradley | Nominated | |
