= Arielle Prepetit =

American actress

- Born: Orlando, Florida, U.S.
- Occupations: Actress; singer; dancer
- Years active: 2018–present
- Television: Beyond the Gates

Arielle Prepetit is an American actress, dancer and singer. She was born and raised in Orlando, Florida and began training in dance at the age of five before beginning acting training when she was 17. She has performed in shows at Walt Disney World and in productions such as adaptations of Flashdance The Musical and Legally Blonde: The Musical. She has also acted in various films and short films, such as The System (2022) and About My Father (2023), and made guest appearances in television series such as BMF and Found. Since February 2025, she has been starring in the new CBS soap opera Beyond the Gates as Naomi Hamilton Hawthorne, for which she received a Daytime Emmy Award nomination in 2026.

== Life and career ==
Prepetit is an actor, dancer and singer. She was born and raised in Orlando, Florida. She wanted to be a dancer and trained for it during her adolescence, having discovered her joy for it when she was five years old. When she was 17, she decided that she wanted to be on broadways and with the guidance of her teacher, she signed up for acting classes using the money she had made from babysitting. She then decided to pursue an onscreen acting career but continued to perform and dance. Prepetit worked at Universal Studios and Walt Disney World, where she performed in parades and shows such as Main Street Trolley Show and Mickey's Royal Friendship Faire. She also performed in Grinchmas Who-liday Spectacular at Universal Orlando. Prepetit also performed in other productions, including an adaptation of A Tennessee Walk. In 2019, she was part of the production of Flashdance The Musical, which was performed at the Garden Theatre stage in Winter Garden. Matthew J. Palm from the Orlando Sentinel wrote that Prepetit and the other dancers created "lovely harmonies". In 2020, she was set to go on an eight-month cruise contract as a singer, but this was canceled due to the COVID-19 pandemic and so she decided to focus on acting.

Prepetit was part of the ensemble of Orlando Shakespeare Theater's Little Shop of Horrors, which ran in May 2021 in Lake Eola Park in Orlando. That same month, she moved to Atlanta, which she considered the "best decision" she made for her career, and she made most of her living by acting work in films, television and commercials. Prepetit played a leading role in the 2022 short film Plant Parenthood and later appeared in another short film, Anemoia, which was screened at the 2024 Nashville Film Festival.

Prepetit also played Michelle in the 2023 comedy film About My Father. She also appeared in several television series, including BMF and Found, in addition to films such as The System (2022), Haunted Mansion (2023), Freedom Hair (2024) and Sketch (2024). Prepetit also played Kendra Reed in the 2024 movie Bull Street, and also played Candace in the short film The Last Black Dinosaur (2024). The actress has also been in various commercials, including advertisements for Home Depot, Camping World, Terra Chips and others. She was also in the ensemble of the cast of Legally Blonde: The Musical, which ran in May 2024.

In October 2024, it was announced that Prepetit had joined the ensemble cast of the then-upcoming CBS soap opera Beyond the Gates as civil attorney Naomi Hamilton Hawthorne. It was the first African-American daytime soap opera in 34 years and debuted on February 24, 2025. Prepetit received overwhelming positive support from viewers who were happy to be able to start watching a soap opera from the beginning and she enjoyed working with Karla Mosley, who portrays Naomi's mother Dani Dupree. Prepetit had grown up watching soap operas with her grandmother and thus knew Mosley from other soaps. Prepetit revealed in an interview that her family watch the soap and that her mother was proud of her for playing an attorney. Discussing Beyond the Gates, Michael Fairman opined that Prepetit "has a strength to her performances which are refreshing to watch". CBS News said that Prepetit was having her "breakout moment" on the soap.

== Personal life ==
Prepetit is from Orlando, Florida. Prepetit is part of the LGBTQ+ community and has been dating singer and actress Rachel Jarrard since 2023. Prepetit's household used to primarily watch soap operas General Hospital and The Bold and the Beautiful, including her grandmother, who could not speak English. Prepetit can speak Haitian Creole.

== Acting credits ==
=== Selected filmography ===
Selected filmography credits
Year	Title	Role	Notes
Unknown	Best Intentions	—N/a	—N/a
2022	Plant Parenthood	Margaret	Short film
2022	The System	Janette Johnson	Film
2023	Found	Mira	Guest role (1 episode)
2023	About My Father	Michelle	Comedy film
2023	Haunted Mansion	Can-Can girl	Film
2024	The Last Black Dinosaur	Candace	Short film
2024	Sketch	Newlywed wife	Film
2024	Freedom Hair	Bride to be	Film
2024	Anemoia	Betty	Short film
2024	Bull Street	Kendra Reed	Film
2025	BMF	Kiki	Guest role (1 episode)
2025	Beyond the Gates	Naomi Hamilton Hawthorne	Series regular
2025	Entitled	Maya Anderson	TV series

=== Theater ===
List of theater credits
Year	Production	Venue	Role
—N/a	The Main Street Trolley Show	Walt Disney World	Trolley Dancer
—N/a	Mickey's Royal Friendship Faire	Walt Disney World	—N/a
—N/a	Grinchmas Who-liday Spectacular	Universal Orlando	Busy Body
—N/a	Lab Rats Improv Troupe	SAK Comedy Lab	Ensemble
—N/a	Mission STEAMpossible	Magnificent	Michelee Puppets
2018	A Tennessee Walk	Garden Theatre	Willa Fay
2019	Flashdance The Musical	Garden Theatre	Kiki
2021	Little Shop of Horrors	Lake Eola Park	Ensemble
2024	Legally Blonde: The Musical	City Springs Theatre	Ensemble

== Awards and nominations ==
List of awards and nominations
Year	Award	Category	Work	Result	Ref.
2026	Daytime Emmy Award	Outstanding Emerging Talent in a Daytime Drama Series	Beyond the Gates	Nominated	
