= Tracey Thomson =

American screenwriter

Tracey Thomson is an American television soap opera writer for CBS Daytime's The Young and the Restless. She is sharing head-writing duties with Charles Pratt Jr. who originally hired her to be a script writer on All My Children. In 2019 she started to write for "Sulphur Springs" with Charles Pratt Jr. She attended the University of Georgia and started her career with CNN in Atlanta before moving to California. In 2025, she joined the CBS daytime drama Beyond The Gates as co-head writer and executive producer, working alongside series creator and show runner Michele Val Jean.

== Positions held ==
General Hospital (hired by Robert Guza Jr.)

- Associate Head writer: July 26, 2011-May 2012
- Occasional Breakdown writer: May 2007 – July 2008)
- Script writer: September 11, 2006 – January 3, 2008; March 17, 2008 - July 30, 2008; June 17, 2010 – July 25, 2011
- Occasional script writer: March 28, 2006 – July 13, 2006
- Script Continuity: 2005–2006

All My Children

- Script Writer (February 17, 2010 - May 6, 2010)
- Associate Head Writer (September 11, 2008 - February 18, 2010)
- Occasional Script Writer (September 25, 2008 - 2009)

The Young and the Restless (hired by Josh Griffith)

- Script Writer: December 4, 2012
- Co-Head Writer: December 7, 2012 – March 18, 2015
- Associate Head Writer: March 19, 2015 – March 15, 2017

Secrets of Sulphur Springs

- Executive Producer and Creator, 2021

Beyond the Gates

- Co-Head Writer: 2025–present
- Executive Producer: 2025–present
