= Preacherman =

- VHS cover
- Directed by: Albert T. Viola
- Produced by: Robert N. Langworthy; Albert T. Viola
- Starring: Albert T. Viola; Ilene Kristen; Adam Hesse; Marian Brown; Esty F. Davis Jr.
- Cinematography: Jim Collins
- Edited by: Thomas DeBona; William J. Sawyer
- Music by: Roland Pope; W. Henry Smith
- Distributed by: Troma Entertainment
- Release date: 1971
- Running time: 82 minutes
- Country: United States
- Language: English
- Budget: $65,000
- Box office: $5,000,000

Preacherman is a 1971 American comedy film written, directed, and starring Albert T. Viola. The film revolves around a backwoods con artist posing as a country preacher, who, during a sojourn in a small North Carolina town, alternately misleads a local landowner to take advantage of his daughter, but also helps him sell moonshine to get revenge on a rival. Initially released mostly to theatres in the American south by small distributor Variety Films, the modestly-budgeted film grossed over $5 million, spawning a sequel, Preacherman Meets Widderwoman, in 1973. It was later widely distributed on home video by Troma Entertainment.

== Plot ==
After having sex with a girl who turns out to be the daughter of White Oak County sheriff Zero Bull, self-proclaimed Preacherman Amos Huxley (Viola) is beaten by the sheriff and his deputy and left outside the county line, warned never to return. He is unwittingly brought back into the sheriff's jurisdiction by local farmer Judd Crabtree (Esty F. Davis Jr.), who picks up the unconscious Huxley and takes him to his home. Aware there is a countywide roadblock looking for escaped convicts (and likely himself), Huxley decides to stay with Crabtree, especially after meeting his daughter Mary Lou (Ilene Kristen), who has been fooling around with multiple boys in the area. Under pretense of baptizing Mary Lou and curbing her lascivious behavior, Huxley fools her into multiple sexual encounters and diverts Judd from noticing by sending him outside to watch for "the Angel Leroy."

Judd confesses to Huxley that instead of farming, he has generated income through an illegal moonshine still, a business sanctioned with Sheriff Bull and Bull's shopkeeper brother-in-law. Huxley, seeing a chance to make money and get revenge on Bull, suggests Judd can continue the business as a revenue-generator to build a new church, using travelling saleswoman Martha (who is attracted to Judd) as the new supplier instead of the sheriff's infrastructure. Other locals are brought into the operation, which becomes a success. The new venture draws the attention of Clyde Massingale (Adam Hesse), one of Mary Lou's former paramours, jealous at no longer having sexual access to the now "saved" girl. Huxley tries to recruit Clyde into the business to keep him quiet, but Sheriff Bull, noticing that Clyde is now working for Judd despite their history of animosity, senses the boy may know about either Huxley or the loss of his former bootlegging revenue, and alerts him to Huxley's criminal past.

The prisoner dragnet now ended, Huxley sees a chance to flee the county with Mary Lou, but convinces Judd and Martha to stage a large revival event, where he can proceed to rake in more cash. Clyde rats out Huxley to Bull, who raids the meeting. Judd distracts Bull long enough for Huxley and Mary Lou to escape, but as they run, Mary Lou admits to Huxley she loves Clyde. Huxley, somewhat relieved, tells Mary Lou he has left a large share of the profits in her bedroom for herself and Judd, and runs off alone. Clyde, upon reuniting with Mary Lou, misleads Bull and his deputy, allowing Huxley to make it to the next county free and clear.
