= RhonniRose Mantilla =

American actress (born 2000)

- Born: February 15, 2000 (age 26)
- Education: Baldwin Wallace University
- Occupations: Actress; singer; dancer
- Years active: 2018–present
- Television: Beyond the Gates

RhonniRose Mantilla (born February 15, 2000) is an American singer, dancer and actress. She has been a dancer since she was four years old and she studied musical theatre at Baldwin Wallace University. After graduating in 2022, she performed in the pre-Broadway show with The Notebook at Chicago Shakespeare Theater. She then performed in the Broadway production of Harmony and the tour Into the Woods, as well as several regional productions. Mantilla was then cast as Chelsea Hamilton in the CBS soap Beyond the Gates as part of its original cast, which has been broadcasting since February 2025.

== Life and career ==
RhonniRose Mantilla was born on February 15, 2000. Her father is Puerto Rican and her mother is African American. She is from St. Louis. Mantilla was raised by her grandmother and her mother. Mantilla has described her mother as a "momager" and has praised her for helping her get to where she is. Mantilla started out as a dancer at the age of four, tap, modern, ballet and jazz dance. She then began to do summer shows and "fell in love" with theatre, and she later decided to pursue theatre. She went on to study Musical Theatre at Baldwin Wallace University. In 2018, Mantilla played Anita in the Center of Creative Arts' production of West Side Story, which was performed in Washington University in St. Louis' Edison Theater in July 2018. Talking about her Puerto Rican heritage and her role, Mantilla said, "I feel like, since it being in my blood, it just kind of comes out more and it's easier to kind of shift into my character as Anita as she's very sassy and very spicy". After graduating from Baldwin Wallace University with a Bachelor of Music in 2022, she performed in the pre-Broadway show with The Notebook at Chicago Shakespeare Theater, where she was an understudy. She then worked various jobs, including as a hostess, waitress and nanny, in New York. Her agent is A3 Artists Agency.

Mantilla made her Broadway debut in the production production of Harmony as part of the ensemble and the understudy for the character of Josephine Baker. In 2024, Mantilla was part of Great Lakes Theater's tour production of musical Into the Woods, where she played the role of Cinderella. Her performance was praised by Roy Berko from BroadwayWorld, who called her "Lovely and talented" and praised her "a wonderful comic-timing sense, especially in doing prat-falls" in addition to her "strong singing voice" and her "music story-telling abilities". Mantilla also appeared in regional productions of Jesus Christ Superstar, The Wiz, A Chorus Line and Buddy Holly Story. Mantilla also produced, directed and created Stardust, a musical and showcase of her dancing. Additionally, she was part of the regional productions of Grease and Catch Me If You Can at New London Barn Playhouse.

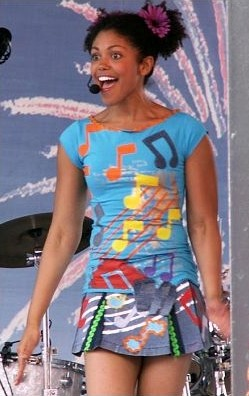
Mantilla enjoyed working with her Beyond the Gates colleague Karla Mosley (pictured).

In October 2024, it was announced that Mantilla had joined the ensemble cast of the then-upcoming CBS soap opera Beyond the Gates as fashion model and influencer Chelsea Hamilton. It was the first Black daytime soap opera in 35 years and debuted on February 24, 2025. Beyond the Gates was Mantilla's first screen role. Explaining how she received the role, Mantilla recalled that she went home during a break from the tour of Into the Woods and sent in a self-tape for the role of Kat for Beyond the Gates, but she was then asked by the casting team to read for the role of Chelsea instead, so she did. When Mantilla found out that she had received the role, she moved to Atlanta. Michael Fairman praised Mantilla's performance in Beyond the Gates, opining that the actress was "quickly making a name for herself" in the role. Elaine G. Flores from Soap Opera Digest called Mantilla a "rising star".

Mantilla described her character as a social media influencer and model who is trying to find her own path in life. Mantilla enjoyed working with Karla Mosley and Tamara Tunie, who portray Chelsea's mother and grandmother on the soap, respectively, and called working with the pair an "incredible opportunity" and was glad to "to be able to show strong Black women" due to having been raised by her mother and grandmother herself. Mantilla described working with Mosley as her "favourite thing", calling her helpful and acting like a mother. Mantilla also praised the Beyond the Gates costume team, saying that she trusted them fully. As part of promotion for the soap, Mantilla had an interview with Ebony magazine, which she described as her dream coming true as her grandmother used to collect the magazine when she was younger, explaining, "when I was little, I would make vision boards. I would cut the models out because they looked like me...EBONY was the magazine to me growing up". Mantilla explained that she had seen that Chelsea's sex positivity been talked a lot about by viewers. The actress felt privileged to be able to portray that on the soap, explaining, "I think it's really, really vital for that kind of character, for Chelsea, to be seen, because it just reflects how our society is. I hope that other queer and questioning and poly people like Chelsea can kind of see themselves in the character". The actress also hoped that she would be able to sing on the soap at some point.

== Acting credits ==
=== Filmography ===
Filmography roles
Year	Title	Role	Notes	Ref.
2025	Beyond the Gates	Chelsea Hamilton	Series regular	

=== Stage credits ===
Stage roles
Year	Production	Role	Venue(s)	Ref.
Unknown	The Wiz	Unknown	St. Louis Municipal Opera Theatre	
Unknown	Catch Me If You Can	Unknown	New London Barn Playhouse	
Unknown	Grease	Unknown	New London Barn Playhouse	
Unknown	Buddy Holly Story	Unknown	St. Louis Municipal Opera Theatre	
Unknown	Jesus Christ Superstar	Unknown	St. Louis Municipal Opera Theatre	
Unknown	A Chorus Line	Unknown	St. Louis Municipal Opera Theatre	
2018	West Side Story	Anita	Edison Theater (Washington University in St. Louis)	
2022	The Notebook	Understudy	Chicago Shakespeare Theater	
2023–24	Harmony	Ensemble and Understudy	Broadway	
2024	Into the Woods	Cinderella	Various	
