= Roxy Balsom =

- One Life to Live character
- Portrayed by: Ilene Kristen
- Duration: 2001–2012
- First appearance: November 7, 2001
- Last appearance: January 13, 2012
- Created by: Lorraine Broderick and Christopher Whitesell
- Introduced by: Gary Tomlin
In-universe information
- Other names: Roxy Lipschitz; Roxy Holden
- Occupation: Beautician; Owner of Foxy Roxy's Hair Haven; Owner of the Angel Square Hotel
- Parents: Stella Lipschitz
- Spouse: Dr. Walter Balsom (pre-2001); Max Holden (2002–03)
- Sons: Schuyler Joplin
- Adoptive children: Natalie Buchanan; Rex Balsom
- Grandchildren: Shane Balsom (adoptive); Liam McBain (adoptive)

Roxy Balsom is a fictional character from ABC's daytime drama One Life to Live. The character was played by Ilene Kristen from November 7, 2001, through the final episode on January 13, 2012.

The character is known for her constant malapropisms, which most other characters ignore and find amusing.

== Storylines ==
Roxy is introduced in 2001 as the irresponsible mother of Natalie Buchanan and Rex Balsom. It is soon revealed that Natalie is the biological daughter of Victoria Lord and Clint Buchanan. It is initially believed that when Allison Perkins had kidnapped the Buchanan baby in 1987, another child was returned and grew up to be Jessica Buchanan. Jessica begins a tenuous relationship with Roxy, whom she believes to be her mother, but a DNA test on Jessica proves that she is also Viki's daughter. Viki's longtime enemy, Mitch Laurence, who had masterminded the kidnapping, had secretly raped a drugged Viki around the same time that she had conceived a child with Clint. Viki unknowingly became pregnant with fraternal twins, one fathered by Clint (Natalie) and the other by Mitch (Jessica). Dr. Walter Balsom, who had been one of Mitch's followers, took Mitch's daughter during delivery, and Viki never knew she'd had given birth to two babies. Mitch, however, wanted his daughter to grow up loved by Viki in the lap of luxury and sent Allison to kidnap Clint's child. They replaced her with Mitch's daughter (Jessica), and gave Clint's daughter (Natalie) to Dr. Balsom and his wife, Roxy. Walter later died, and Roxy turned out to be an irresponsible mother for much of Natalie's childhood.

In 2002, Rex Balsom comes to Llanview to take advantage of the wealthy Buchanan family. Raised by his father's sister, Corinne Balsom, Rex has an uneasy relationship with Roxy. Rex remains close to Natalie, the sister he grew up with. In 2008, his Aunt Corrine drops a bombshell: the man Rex believed to be his father, Walter Balsom, may not have been his biological father. Charlie Banks, who is hiding his identity, glances idly at Roxy's business card and introduces himself as Charlie Balsom. Rex asks if he and Charlie are related. To stop Rex from looking further, Roxy claims that Charlie is his father. She begs Charlie to go along with the story; he ultimately agrees. It is later revealed that Rex was switched at birth with Schuyler Joplin. Rex ultimately learns that his biological parents are Clint Buchanan and Echo DiSavoy.

In Las Vegas, Roxy ends up running into her former lover, Max Holden. The next morning, Max wakes up in bed with Roxy. Roxy tricked him into a quickie marriage. In the sober light of day, Max despises Roxy and goes out of his way to be cruel to her in hopes that she will divorce him. Max later finds out that Roxy is being held hostage by Allison Perkins, but he is more interested in keeping Roxy out of the way a bit longer to claim abandonment and win a fast divorce with his fortune intact. He showers love on his bride and tries to keep her away from the courthouse long enough to win his freedom. However, Roxy shows up, exposing his lies, and Judge Fitzwater gives her the opportunity to dump Max and take everything he owns. To everyone's surprise, Roxy chooses Max over the cash. Although relieved, Max continues to shun Roxy, even making a deal with old enemy Asa Buchanan to help Asa escape his sham marriage to Rae Cummings if Asa would do the same with Roxy. Max tracks Roxy down to Philadelphia, assuming she is cheating with Asa. Instead, she is visiting her vile, hateful mother, who passes up no opportunity to make Roxy feel like garbage. Max stuns both himself and Roxy by barging into the room to defend her. Max realizes that he is falling in love with Roxy and calls off the deal with Asa. However, Rae has already figured out the plan and manipulates Roxy on every level, even flinging herself on Max so Roxy would catch them in a compromising position. Roxy's heart is shattered and she can no longer trust Max. In spite of his fervent pleas, Roxy divorces him and is awarded the mill house, the Break Bar, all the bank accounts, and marital assets. With that money, Roxy is able to buy her own hair salon: Foxy Roxy's Hair Haven.

In March 2009, Roxy learns that her grandson, Shane, has leukemia and needs a bone marrow transplant. Roxy goes to a facility where she takes the DNA of a mysterious man to see if he can donate stem cells to Shane. Roxy finds out that the man can donate stem cells to Shane to save his life. Gigi's sister, Stacy Morasco, blackmails Roxy to make it look like she is the donor in order to get Rex for herself. Roxy and Stacy convince Kyle Lewis to make it look like Stacy is the donor. Kyle threatens Roxy to let him live in her hotel or he'll tell Rex who his father really is.

In early August 2009, Rex finds out that his biological father is Mitch Laurence. Roxy find out in February 2010 from Kyle that Rex isn't the father of Stacy's baby. In late March 2010 Allison Perkins reveals to Roxy that the night Rex was born, she switched her baby with an abandoned one because her baby was sick. Roxy tells Rex that he is not her son. Allison tells Roxy that her son is Schuyler Joplin, who has been arrested for shooting Bo Buchanan. In October 2010 Echo DiSavoy returns to Llanview and needs a place to stay. With no money, Echo takes pictures of Roxy in order to let her stay at the hotel. After finding out that Rex's biological parents are Echo and Clint, Roxy throws Echo out of her hotel.

At the end of the series, Roxy says good-bye to Rex when he and Gigi decide to move to London with Shane.

== Reception ==
For her portrayal of Roxy, Kristen garnered two consecutive Daytime Emmy Award nominations for Outstanding Supporting Actress in a Drama Series in 2004 and 2005. In 2024, Charlie Mason from Soaps She Knows included Roxy in his list of the worst mothers in American soap operas, writing, "Though the brassy beautician was often played for laughs, there was nothing funny about the screwed-up individuals that her "mothering" made of Natalie and Rex — and it turned out, they weren't even Roxy's kids!"
