= Trisha Mann-Grant =

American actress

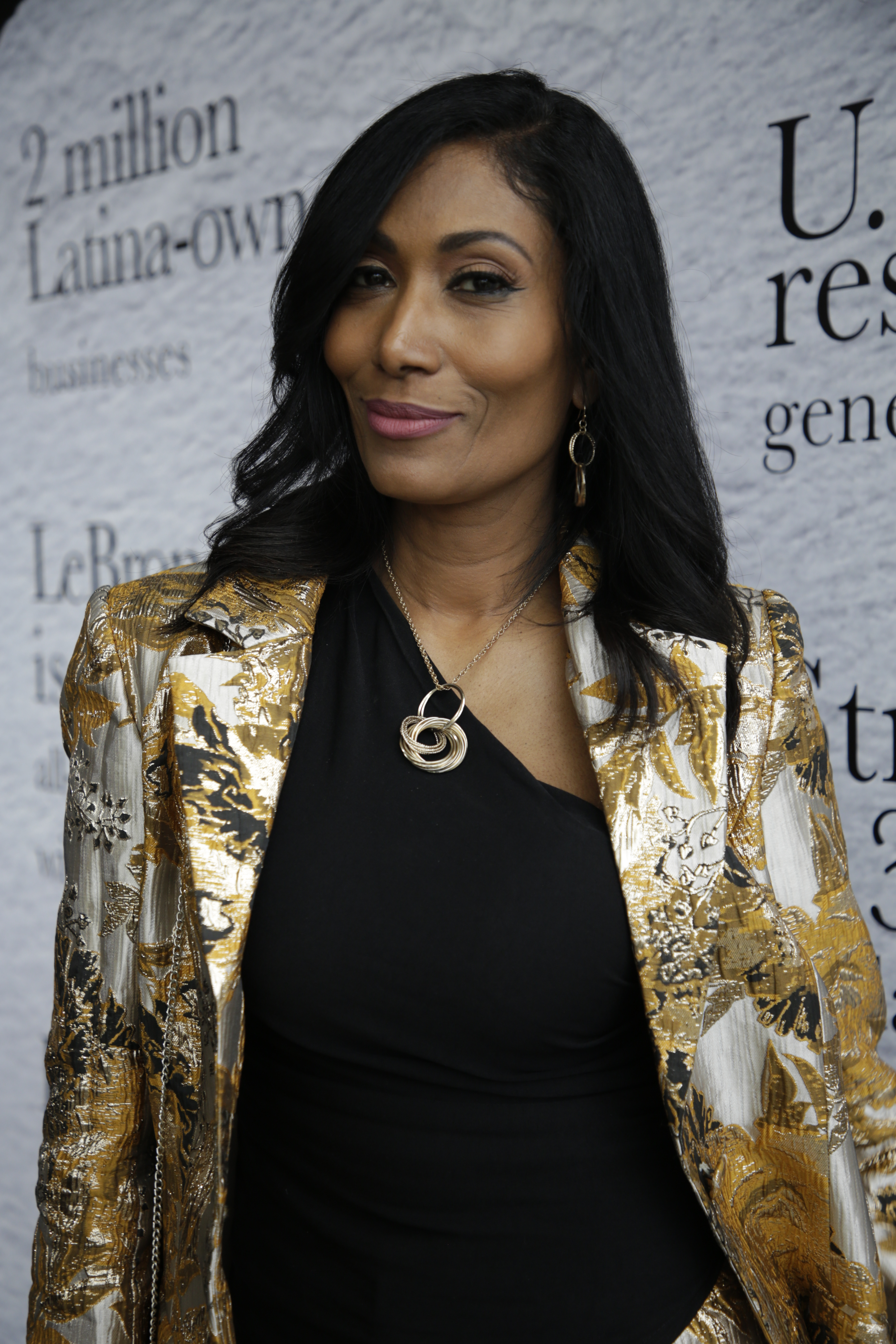
- Mann-Grant in 2025 at Black Week in NYC.
- Born: Trisha Mann; Chicago, Illinois, U.S
- Occupation: Actress
- Years active: 2000–present

Trisha Mann-Grant is an Emmy Nominated American actress. She is known for playing the role of Dominique Leroux in the BET+ crime drama series, The Family Business. In 2025, she began starring as Dana “Leslie” Thomas in the CBS soap opera, Beyond the Gates, for which she received a Daytime Emmy Award nomination for Outstanding Supporting Actress in a Drama Series in 2026.

== Life and career ==
Mann was born in Chicago, Illinois and attended the Roosevelt University. While studying, Mann became a member of Delta Sigma Theta sorority and was crowned Miss Black Chicago. She later began performing as a model before making her stage and screen debuts as an actress. During the 2000s, Mann appeared in a number of independent movies and guest-starred on television series such as The Parkers, Eve and Cold Case. She also performed on stage productions such as The Great Women of Color, The Visit, An Evening of Shakespeare with Charles Dutton, Jeffery’s Plan, Say Amen and Souled Out. She starred opposite Stephanie Mills in the national tour of David E. Talbert’s His Woman His Wife and received NAACP Theatre Awards nomination for performance in musical If You Don’t Believe: A Love Story.

In 2015, Mann starred in the mystery crime-thriller film, The Man in 3B directed by Trey Haley and based on the novel of the same name by Carl Weber. She later appeared in the comedy-drama film Throwback Holiday directed by Haley, and in 2020 was cast as Dominique Leroux in the BET+ crime drama series, The Family Business also based on Carl Weber's novel series.

In 2024, she was cast Dana “Leslie” Thomas in the CBS soap opera, Beyond the Gates. The soap premiered in early 2025.

== Filmography ==
Film roles
Year	Title	Role	Notes
2000	Retiring Tatiana	Bear's Boo	
2000	His Woman His Wife		Filmed stage production
2006	Section 8	Simone	
2006	Reunion	CeCe	
2009	Big Bag of $	Tina	
2009	Joshua's Soul	Martha Evans	Short film
2010	My American Nurse 2	Shalamar	
2011	The Lawyer, the Thug & the Princess	Cierra Young	
2011	Lord, All Men Can't Be Dogs	Ruby	
2012	The Last Fall	Beverly Davis	
2014	Who Can I Run To	Erica	
2015	The Man in 3B	Nancy	
2017	Nancy	CoCo Brown	
2018	Throwback Holiday	Mrs. Weaver	
2022	Chocolate City 3: Live Tour	Tasha	
2022	You Married Dat	Mona's Mom	
2022	Santa Games	Carol	
2022	Because We're Done	Erica Wilson	
2023	A Royal Christmas Surprise	Auntie Gina	
2024	Brownies	Mrs. Margolin	Short film

Television roles
Year	Title	Role	Notes
2003	The Parkers	Ashley	Episode: "That's What Friends Are For"
2003	All About the Andersons	Alexis	Episode: "Go with the Flo"
2004	Eve	Tiffany	Episode: "Self Helpless"
2008	Cold Case	Belle	Episode: "Slipping"
2014	Love Thy Neighbor	Karen	Episode: "Make Love to Me"
2020–present	The Family Business	Dominique Leroux	25 episodes
2003	Mind Your Business	Dr. Davis	Episode: "Center Stage"
2025—present	Beyond the Gates	Dana “Leslie” Thomas	Series regular

== Awards and nominations ==
List of awards and nominations
Year	Award	Category	Work	Result	Ref.
2026	Daytime Emmy Award	Outstanding Supporting Actress in a Drama Series	Beyond the Gates	Nominated	
