= The Man in 3B =

- Theatrical release poster
- Directed by: Trey Haley
- Screenplay by: Carl Weber
- Based on: The Man in 3B by Carl Weber
- Produced by: ND Brown; Carl Weber; Veronica Nichols; Tracey Moore
- Starring: Lamman Rucker; Christian Keyes; Brely Evans; Anthony Montgomery; Robert Ri'chard; Nafessa Williams; DB Woodside; Kellita Smith; James Black; Olivia Longett; Trisha Mann; Jackée Harry; Marla Gibbs; Billy Dee Williams
- Cinematography: Eric Wycoff
- Edited by: Chris Peppé
- Music by: Matthew Head
- Production companies: Urban Books Media; Tri Destined Studios
- Distributed by: Freestyle Releasing
- Release dates: February 15, 2015 (Pan African Film Festival); November 6, 2015
- Running time: 93 minutes
- Country: United States
- Language: English
- Box office: $291,513

The Man in 3B is a 2015 American mystery crime-thriller film directed by Trey Haley. The film is based on the novel of the same name written by The New York Times best-selling author Carl Weber. The Man in 3B stars an ensemble cast that includes Lamman Rucker, Christian Keyes, Anthony Montgomery, Robert Ri'chard, Nafessa Williams, DB Woodside, Kellita Smith, James Black, Jackée Harry, Marla Gibbs, and Billy Dee Williams. The film was released on November 6, 2015.

== Plot ==
Darryl Graham moves into an apartment complex, meeting his new neighbors: Connie and Avery, who have a troubled marriage; couple Slim and Krystal, who is Avery's daughter; Ben and his son Benny; and several gossiping women. As Benny helps Darryl move into his apartment, the two become friends. Connie, who initially disbelieves the gossips when they say Darryl is the most attractive man they've ever seen, makes a fool of herself when introducing herself to him. She later encounters Darryl while exercising in the park, explaining that she is trying to get back into shape to save her marriage. Darryl offers to be her personal trainer.

Avery angrily quits his job when a promised promotion goes instead to the owner's incompetent son. Drunk and upset with his disappointing life, he contemplates suicide. He is stopped by a wealthy man named Cain, who explains he, too, considered suicide at the same bridge several years ago. Cain offers him a job and shares his life philosophy: one's old life and problems must be left behind at the bridge. Meanwhile, at the apartment complex, Darryl and Krystal have sex, revealing they had previously been in a relationship. Krystal, however, blows off Darryl once Slim proposes to her.

Benny counsels Darryl to forget about Krystal, impressing Darryl with his maturity for a 20-year-old. As they talk, Benny finds On the Down Low, a non-fiction book about closeted gay African-American men. Benny becomes uncomfortable and quickly leaves. Under Cain's guidance, Avery becomes an armed robber. After spending time with Cain and becoming intoxicated with his decadent lifestyle, Avery tells Connie he wants a divorce. Upset and hurt, Connie turns to Darryl, and the two begin a relationship. She is surprised when the police come asking about Avery and Cain, searching her apartment with a warrant.

Krystal comes on to Darryl, offering to maintain an affair, which Darryl rejects. When Slim catches her coming on Darryl, she accuses Darryl of attempted rape. Darryl's life is further complicated when Benny makes a pass at him, assuming Darryl to be gay. Benny is crushed when Darryl explains he is straight and was only trying to understand his gay brother's struggles by reading On the Down Low. In denial that his son is gay, Ben angrily accuses Darryl of trying to corrupt Benny. At the same time, Avery learns of Darryl's and Connie's relationship. Amid these issues, Darryl is found dead in his apartment after an arson.

Detectives Thomas and Anderson question each of the occupants. Eventually, evidence is found in Ben's apartment, and he confesses to the murder, assuming Benny is the killer. The police become suspicious when they learn Avery was seen in the apartment complex prior to Darryl's death, and they press Connie for details, also learning from Krystal that her mother died mysteriously in a fire. Krystal, who blames Connie for her mother's death, is shocked when the police reveal evidence tying her father to the murder of both her mother and Darryl. After making a plea bargain to avoid jail time for aiding her father's escape, she works with the police to set a trap.

Three months later, Connie leaves the apartment complex. She hands Darryl's brother's number to Benny, who has reconciled with his now-freed father. In Jamaica, she meets up with Darryl, who is revealed to be alive. Connie flashes back to the day of Darryl's faked death: after being abandoned by Cain, Avery returns to the apartment to rob Connie. When Avery threatens to kill Darryl, Connie kills him, then helps Darryl make it look like Avery had killed him. After Connie leads the police to Avery as a suspect, she helps him impersonate Avery by sending incriminating text messages to Krystal, whose trap he ignores.

== Cast ==
- Lamman Rucker as Darryl Graham
- Christian Keyes as Slim
- Brely Evans as Connie
- D. B. Woodside as Det. Thomas
- Nafessa Williams as Krystal
- Kellita Smith as Det. Anderson
- Anthony Montgomery as Avery
- Billy Dee Williams as Cain
- James Black as Ben
- Robert Ri'chard as Benny
- Jackée Harry as Miss Bertha
- Trisha Mann as Nancy
- Olivia Longett as Jerri
- Marla Gibbs as Ms. Mamie
- Rayan Lawrence as Trevor

== Production ==
Shooting took place in Los Angeles.

== Release ==
The Man in 3B premiered at the Pan African Film Festival on February 15, 2015. Freestyle Releasing released it to theaters on November 6, 2016, and it grossed $291,513 in the US.

== See also ==
- List of black films of the 2010s
