= Ilene Kristen =

American actress

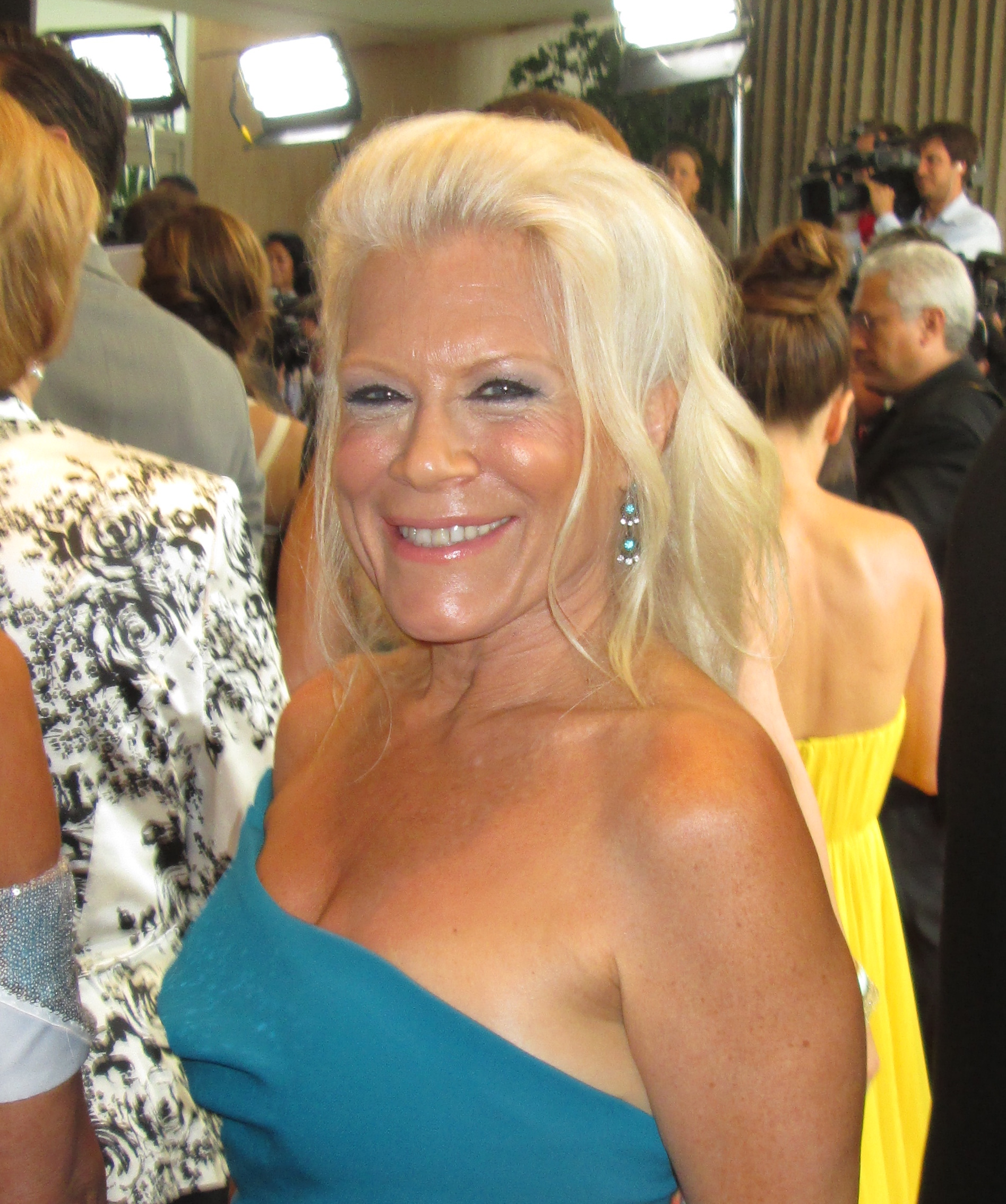
- Kristen in 2014
- Born: Ilene Schatz; July 30, 1952 (age 74); Brooklyn, New York City, U.S.
- Occupation: Actress
- Years active: 1971–present
- Website: http://www.ilenekristen.net/

Ilene Kristen (born Ilene Schatz; July 30, 1952) is an American actress. She is best known for her role as Delia Ryan in the ABC soap opera Ryan's Hope (1975–1979, 1982–1983, 1986–1989) and her Emmy-nominated performances as Roxy Balsom on One Life to Live (2001–2012).

== Early years ==
Ilene Kristen was born Ilene Schatz in Brooklyn, New York City, the elder child of Arthur Schatz of Williamsburg, Brooklyn and Myrna Levin of Borough Park, Brooklyn. Her father was a hairdresser who owned a series of beauty parlors across Manhattan, Brooklyn, and Palm Beach, Florida. She has a younger sister, Karen Schatz.

She lived in Brooklyn until the age of 13 when her family moved to the Forest Hills area of Queens, where she lived for two years. In 1968, the family moved to the Upper West Side of Manhattan. She attended PS 217 in Brooklyn, Russell Sage Junior High School in Queens, and Professional Children's School in Manhattan. She then went to Finch College where she majored in Drama and minored in Art History.

She studied dance under Sara Felcher, Alwin Nikolais, and Matt Mattox. Her early inspirations were Bambi Linn and Sondra Lee. She decided to become a professional actor after seeing the Off-Broadway musical, The Fantasticks. She later studied acting with Jack Waltzer.

== Career ==
Her first television appearance was in 1961 on bandleader Ted Steele's Dance Party, based in Newark, New Jersey.

Her first professional job was on NBC's The Bell Telephone Hour as a dancer when she was 14 years old. She was brought on board by the show's choreographer Matt Mattox. Kristen was a dancer in the ensemble of the 1967 musical Henry, Sweet Henry, based upon The World of Henry Orient. This was the first of several collaborations with the choreographer Michael Bennett, with whom she later worked on the television show Let Us Entertain You (starring Robert Morse) and the show Pinocchio (with Peter Noone of Herman’s Hermits).

In her senior year of professional children’s school, she was on the road with a comedy revue, The Six New Happenings. The revue toured in Dallas and Houston. They were booked in the largest room at the Sahara Hotel in Lake Tahoe. But once the Sahara realized that most of the cast was under-aged, had them kicked out, replaced by Johnny Carson.

She was set to replace the lead actress in the show Steambath, but the show was closed before Kristen got to take over the role. Its producer Dick Scanga felt bad for Kristen, so he offered her a job in his producing office. She ended up working odd jobs on major Broadway productions: catering the opening-night party of the show Lenny (which later became the 1974 film by Bob Fosse) and gold-leafing in Robin Wagner’s scenery department for Jesus Christ Superstar. She made her screen debut in the female lead role in the 1971 comedy film Preacherman.

Her big break came when she auditioned for the role of Patty Simcox in the original Broadway production of Grease (1972), in which she starred for two years.

In 1975, she auditioned for and landed the role of Delia Ryan in the ABC daytime soap opera Ryan’s Hope. She worked on the show until 1979, when she moved to California. In Los Angeles, she appeared in film Why Would I Lie? starring Treat Williams. She played Winona, a prostitute, in The Lady in Red (her scene was with Christopher Lloyd), then did an episode of Family. In 1982, she also played Peter Falk's sister-in-law in a stage production of Knives, which was written and directed by John Cassavetes.

On television in 1982, she did a stint on One Life to Live as Georgina Whitman. She appeared in the comedy revue Strange Behavior (1983-84), which led to her being considered for a role on NBC’s Saturday Night Live. She also starred in Charles Strouse’s and Warren Leight’s Mayor, the musical based on Ed Koch’s memoir of the same name. She played Leona Helmsley, the “Queen of Mean,” among other characters.

In 1986, after starring in Moss Hart’s Light Up the Sky, Kristen was asked to return to Ryan’s Hope. Kristen, always adept with comedy, says that her last four years at Ryan’s Hope were happy ones, as the writers gave her a lot of funny material to work with. During this period (1986-90), Kristen toured around the club circuits, performing with rock bands and jazz musicians at Mikell's on the Upper West Side. She did another off-Broadway show, Cowboy, a musical tribute to the life of the painter Charlie “Kid” Russell.

During the final three years of Ryan’s Hope, Kristen worked at a homeless shelter, the Prince George. Through the Children's Aid Society, she served as the kids’ introduction to the arts and movies. A group of these children later appeared on several episodes of Ryan’s Hope.

From 1990-1991, she starred in Loving, portraying Norma Gilpin, a dees-dems-doze broad from Brooklyn. She was coupled with the Tony Award-winning actor and director Walter Bobbie, who had originated the role of Roger in the Broadway production of Grease alongside Kristen in 1972. After that stint, Kristen did three off-Broadway productions: All That Glitters, Trust, and The Gig at the Goodspeed. She was also Madeleine Thompson, an alcoholic wannabe socialite, on Another World.

In the late 1990s, Kristen served as the co-artistic director and literary manager for Musical Theatre Works, alongside Gordon Greenberg. She came out to California to serve as one of the producers for the film Angels with Angles, starring Frank Gorshin and Rodney Dangerfield.

After returning to New York City in 2001, she was approached the day before the September 11 attacks for the role of the gambling, beer-guzzling and always-inappropriate hairdresser Roxy Balsom on One Life to Live. At that point in time, she had begun to question the importance of acting; she’d always seen performance as a healing art, and felt that the kind of character that she wanted to create should be entertaining, vivacious, and funny—because people needed it. She ended up playing Roxy Balsom for ten years. Kristen was nominated for two consecutive Daytime Emmy Awards in 2004 and 2005 in the Outstanding Supporting Actress in a Drama Series category for her role as Roxy in One Life to Live.

After One Life to Live was off the air, she featured on General Hospital as Delia, her character from Ryan’s Hope, between 2013 and 2015. Kristen guest-starred in the number of television shows, including Law & Order, The Sopranos, Law & Order: Special Victims Unit, and Unforgettable. In the fall of 2013, she appeared on General Hospital reprising her old role of Delia Ryan from Ryan's Hope who was revealed to be Ava Jerome's natural mother, and made periodic appearances as the storyline dictated.

Kristen is a supporter of the emerging digital series genre and has appeared on the Daytime Emmy-winning series The Bay and Pride: The Series. In 2018, she played Dolly Faye in Mélange. The pilot featured Morgan Fairchild and was written and produced by Tom D'Angora.

== Personal life ==
Kristen currently resides in Manhattan with director Gary Donatelli. She has been a member of the Ensemble Studio Theatre since 1984 and she is on their Board of Directors.

== Music ==
Throughout the 1990s, she was a regular performer with her band at the Triad Theatre.

In 2015, Kristen released her first album, I’m Not Done With U Yet!, produced by Scott Yahney and self-penned with various co-writers. It is available on Amazon and iTunes.

As a songwriter, Ilene has penned album cuts for teenage phenom Kaitlyn Lusk and jazz guitarist Chuck Loeb, as well as produced for the label Tuxedo Records.

== Jean Renoir Cinema ==
In 1977, Kristen founded the Jean Renoir Cinema with Ray Blanco, a young Cuban anti-Castro emigré, and Nancy Newell, one of the first women ever admitted to the Projectionists Guild. Through Blanco’s distribution company, Bauer International (later Liberty Films), the Renoir saw through the first U.S. theatrical distributions of Wim Wenders’s early German features (including Kings of the Road and Alice in the Cities), as well as films by Hans-Jürgen Syberberg, Alexander Kluge, Gregory Nava’s The Confessions of Amans, and Martha Coolidge’s Not a Pretty Picture. The Jean Renoir also presented the first American screenings of films from Luis Buñuel’s Mexican period, including Illusion Travels by Streetcar, Daughter of Deceit, and El Bruto. The Renoir also mounted one of the first significant film festivals devoted to Cuban cinema in the United States.

In the opening weekend, Blanco and Kristen screened films by its namesake director Jean Renoir: Toni, La Marseillaise, and La Bête Humaine. The lobby featured a framed personal letter from Renoir, which gave Kristen and Blanco permission to use his name for the theater.

The Renoir remained open until the end of 1977 due to plumbing and landlord problems.

During this time, Kristen produced a film, The Aftermath, starring Karen Allen.

== Filmography ==
Year	Title	Role	Notes
1971	Preacherman	Mary Lou	
1979	The Lady in Red	Wynona	
1979	Night-Flowers	Krishna Woman	
1980	Family	Lotus	Episode: "Such a Fine Line"
1980	Why Would I Lie?	Waitress	
1982	One Life to Live	Georgina Whitman	Recurring role
1985	Desperately Seeking Susan	Party Guest	
1987	The Shaman	Helen	
1975–1979, 1982–1983, 1986–1989	Ryan's Hope	Delia Ryan	Series regular Nominated - Soap Opera Digest Award for Outstanding Comic Performance by an Actress: Daytime (1988); Nominated - Soap Opera Digest Award for Outstanding Villainess: Daytime (1989)
1990–1991	Loving	Norma Gilpin	Series regular
1994	Law & Order	Sandra Krane	Episode: "Blue Bamboo"
1995	Another World	Madeline Thompson	Series regular
1999	Vivid	Susan	
2000	The Sopranos	Smoker	Episode: "House Arrest"
2001	Third Watch	Flynn	Episode: "Walking Wounded"
2001–2012	One Life to Live	Roxy Balsom	Series regular (2001-2004), Recurring (2004-2012); Nominated - Daytime Emmy Award for Outstanding Supporting Actress in a Drama Series (2004-2005); Nominated - Soap Opera Digest Award for Favorite Return (2003)
2005	Tinsel Town	Attorney	
2005	The Signs of the Cross	Mrs. Coyne	
2007	Mattie Fresno and the Holoflux Universe	Liz	
2007	The Black Donnellys	Claire	Episode: "The World Will Break Your Heart"
2007	Knock Knock	Sexy Librarian	
2008	Manhattanites	Marilyn Marsden	
2011	Hunting Season	Mrs. Klein	
2012	Law & Order: Special Victims Unit	Evelyn Higgins	Episode: "Father's Shadow"
2013	Unforgettable	Naomi McKinnon	Episode: "Line Up or Shut Up"
2013	American Hunger	Sydney Fisher	Short film
2013–2015	General Hospital	Delia Reid Ryan	Recurring role
2013–2016	Pride: The Series	Eleanor Brixton	Recurring role
