= The System (2022 film) =

- Directed by: Dallas Jackson
- Written by: Dallas Jackson
- Produced by: Bryan Lord; Tyrese Gibson; Joe Di Maoi
- Starring: Tyrese Gibson; Terrence Howard; Jeremy Piven; Lil Yachty
- Production company: SkullCrusher Films
- Distributed by: The Avenue
- Release date: October 28, 2022
- Country: United States
- Language: English

The System is an American action film written and directed by Dallas Jackson and produced by SkullCrusher Films starring Tyrese Gibson, Terrence Howard, Jeremy Piven and Lil Yachty.

== Synopsis ==
Terry Savage is a former Marine whose daughter is in need of money for surgery. Desperate and unemployed, he robs drugs from a local gang but is apprehended. The police commissioner makes a deal with Terry to infiltrate a prison to investigate a corrupt prison warden suspected of illegal activities in exchange for release.

To aid in the investigation, the commissioner sneaks in an encrypted smart phone for Terry’s use. It is revealed that the warden runs a pay-per-view fighting tournament called the Dungeon with prisoners as gladiators.

== Cast ==
- Tyrese Gibson
- Jeremy Piven
- Terrence Howard
- Lil Yachty
- Joshua T. Moody

== Production ==
The film was shot in Jackson, Mississippi.

== Release ==
In August 2021, it was announced that Avenue acquired North American distribution rights to the film, which was released in theaters on October 28, 2022. It was also released in digital platforms on November 4, 2022.

== Reception ==
The film has a 40% rating on Rotten Tomatoes based on five reviews.

== See also ==
- List of prison films
