= Michele Val Jean =

American television writer

- Born: September 1951 (age 75); U.S
- Occupations: Writer, producer
- Years active: 1989–present

Michele Val Jean (born September 1951) is an American television writer and producer, best-known for her work on daytime soap operas. Val Jean has written more than 2,000 episodes of daytime soap operas and won seven Daytime Emmy Awards and five Writers Guild of America Awards.

== Life and career ==
Val Jean began her career as a writer in the first African-American daytime soap opera, Generations in 1989. The series was canceled in 1991. In 1990 she worked on the prime time series, Jake and the Fatman. She returned to daytime as a writer on Santa Barbara from 1991 to 1993 receiving her first Writers Guild of America Award for Television: Daytime Serials. In 1993 she joined General Hospital. Val Jean wrote the critically acclaimed 1998 re-visitation of Luke Spencer's rape of Laura Spencer, the rape of Elizabeth Webber, Luke and Laura Spencer's 2006 wedding. In 2000 she was promoted, alongside Elizabeth Korte, to the post of head writer, making her the first African American in the history of daytime television serials to hold the post. She won four Daytime Emmy Award for Outstanding Drama Series Writing Team for her work on General Hospital. She left the soap in 2012.

In 2012, Val Jean joined the CBS soap opera, The Bold and the Beautiful as a script writer. She left the soap in early 2024. In 2019 she also worked as an episodic writer and producer on the Oprah Winfrey Network prime time soap opera, Ambitions. In 2024, Val Jean created a new daytime soap opera, Beyond the Gates for CBS that centers a wealthy Black family. She will serve as a writer, showrunner and executive producer. The soap debuted in February 2025.

== Positions held ==
Beyond the Gates

- Creator and producer

Ambitions

- Consulting Producer 2019
- Writer

The Bold and the Beautiful

- Script writer: January 16, 2012 – April 3, 2024

General Hospital

- Occasional breakdown writer: February 2007 – December 26, 2007
- Co-head writer: January 2001 – April 2001
- Breakdown writer: 1996–2000
- Occasional script writer: 1996–2000
- Script writer: 1993–1996, June 2002 – December 21, 2007, April 7, 2008 – January 10, 2012
- Script editor: 1993–1995 (hired by Claire Labine)

Generations (hired by Sally Sussman Morina)

- Script Writer: 1989–1990

Port Charles

- Occasional Script Writer: 1997–1998

Santa Barbara (hired by Bridget and Jerome Dobson)

- Breakdown writer: 1992–1993
- Script Writer: 1991
- Script Editor: 1992–1993

Jake and the Fatman

== Awards and nominations ==
Val Jean has been nominated for several Daytime Emmy Awards.

Writers Guild Of America Award

- 1993–1998 seasons, 6 nominations for General Hospital
- 1991 and 1992 seasons, 2 nominations for Santa Barbara

TV Guide

- Best Daytime Soap Writer (2004, 2006 & 2007)

Preceded by Robert Guza Jr.	Head writer of General Hospital (with Elizabeth Korte); February 5 – April 27, 2001	Succeeded by Megan McTavish
Preceded by none	Head writer of Beyond the Gates (with Robert Guza Jr.: March 3 – October 14, 2025) (with Tracey Thomson: October 17, 2025 – present); February 24, 2025 – present	Succeeded by Incumbent
