= Steven Williford =

American television director

- Occupation: Television director
- Website: stevenwilliford.com

Steven Williford is an American television director. He was nominated for seven Daytime Emmy Awards in the category Outstanding Drama Series Directing Team for his work on the television programs All My Children, Days of Our Lives and The Young and the Restless.

In 2011, Williford directed his first and only film The Green, starring Jason Butler Harner, Cheyenne Jackson, Illeana Douglas and Julia Ormond.
