= Michael V. Pomarico =

American television soap opera director (born 1955)

Michael V. Pomarico (born July 3, 1955) is an American television soap opera director. He had worked on the ABC-TV daytime drama All My Children for 27 years. He has a wife Mary and two children, Joseph and Jennifer. Since 2025, he is part of the directing team of Beyond the Gates.

Pomarico grew up in Holmdel Township, New Jersey and graduated from Holmdel High School in 1974 as part of its first graduating class.

== Positions held ==
All My Children

- Technical Director (1983–2010)
- Full-time Director (1998–2010)

Beyond the Gates

- Full-time Director (since 2025)

== Awards and nominations ==
Daytime Emmy Award

- Win, 1994, 2002, 2004, 2007, 2008, 2009 Technical Direction, All My Children
- Nomination, 1983, 1986, 1994, 1997, 1998, 2000, 2001, 2002, 2003, 2004, 2006, 2007, 2008, 2009 Technical Direction, All My Children
- Nomination, 2005, 2008, 2009, 2010 Directing, All My Children
- Telly Awards for Producing - Coming Home Again 2007
- Telly Award for Editing - Coming Home Again 2007
- Telly Award for Editing - The New Rascals 2011
