= David Hayward =

- All My Children character
- Portrayed by: Vincent Irizarry
- Duration: 1997–2006; 2008–2011; 2013
- First appearance: November 27, 1997
- Last appearance: September 2, 2013
- Created by: Lorraine Broderick
- Introduced by: Francesca James (1997); Jean Dadario Burke (1998); Julie Hanan Carruthers (2008); Ginger Smith (2013)
- Crossover appearances: One Life to Live
In-universe information
- Occupation: Doctor
- Parents: Charles Hayward; Vanessa Bennett
- Half-brothers: Leo du Pres; Trey Kenyon
- Spouse: Anna Devane (2002–2003); Krystal Carey (2009); Greenlee Smythe (2010–2011)
- Children: Babe Carey; Marissa Tasker; Leora Hayward; Oliver Castillo
- Grandchildren: AJ Chandler
- Aunts: Gwyneth Bennett Stone
- First cousins: Frankie Stone; Maggie Stone

Dr. David Hayward is a fictional character from the ABC and The Online Network serial drama All My Children. The role has been portrayed by Vincent Irizarry, off and on, from November 27, 1997, to September 2, 2013.

The character has been a top television villain for years. His criminal actions have been alluded to by authors, as well as recognized by their own fictional characters. David evolves, but always remains a force antagonizing heroes and heroines of the series.

== Casting ==
Guiding Light alum Irizarry joined the cast of All My Children from November 27, 1997, to March 2, 1998, for what was initially meant to be a short term role. Irizarry returned to the series as a contract player on July 8, 1998. Following nine years in the role, Irizarry exited the series on November 28, 2006, with executive producer Julie Hanan Carruthers citing financial and storyline reasons. Following a two-year absence, Irizarry returned to the series on October 23, 2008, and remained with the series until it aired its final episode on September 23, 2011. On December 28, 2012, it was announced that Irizarry reprised the role on the online reboot, which began on April 29, 2013. Irizarry also portrayed the role on One Life to Live for three episodes in February 2005.

== Storylines ==
=== 1997–2006 ===
Dr. David Hayward first arrives in Pine Valley in late 1997 to reclaim his ex-lover, Dr. Allie Doyle. Allie is dating Dr. Jake Martin at the time. When Allie rejects him, David tries to get Jake out of the way. He frames Jake at the hospital by giving stroke patient Adam Chandler the wrong medication. David arrives "just in time" to play hero, which provides him with enough ammunition to get Jake suspended. David ends up leaving Pine Valley for a short time, but returns less than a year later in an attempt to woo Liza Colby, with whom he has grown infatuated.

David remains a common enemy of the Martin family throughout the next several years, constantly at war with Jake and his father, Joe. But it is his obsession with Dixie Cooney, Jake's sister-in-law, which is the fuel for his greatest rival; Tad Martin.

At the time, Dixie is just one of the many women in Pine Valley with whom David has a romantic relationship. Another significant relationship he has is with Erica Kane, and although it does not end in marriage, David grows very close to Erica's daughter, Bianca Montgomery. When Bianca suffers heart problems as the result of her eating disorder (anorexia nervosa) it is David who treats her and ultimately helps her survive. When Bianca is grieving for the death of Frankie Stone, David plans a memorial for his cousin and offers to involve Bianca. To help Bianca through her pain, he reveals that his father committed suicide when he was a child.

Shortly after his relationship with Erica ends, David pours Libidozone, a drug he created and uses to arouse sexual desires, into a punch bowl at a party aboard a yacht. The drug has the known side effect of causing people to act out on their hidden, restrained impulses. Most everyone aboard the yacht is affected by the drug. The dosing of the punch bowl is eventually discovered and David is arrested. David manages to avoid being convicted of the charges against him by blackmailing Adam (David learns that JR Chandler had stolen drugs from his medical bag) into getting the judge presiding over the case to drop the charges.

David comes to meet many family members of which he is not previously aware, including a half-brother named Leo du Pres and a cousin named Maggie Stone. Leo dies in October 2002, while Maggie moves away from Pine Valley in February 2005. David's mother-Vanessa Bennett- was attempting to shoot and kill Leo's wife, Greenlee Smythe, who she had trapped on a cliff at Miller's Falls. Leo tackled his mother and pulled her off the edge of the waterfall in order to save his wife. Neither body was ever found, but both are presumed dead. Leo's death devastated David.

David and then-wife Anna Devane named their daughter, Leora, after David's beloved half-brother. Leora needed a pacemaker. David wanted to wait until Leora was stronger before the surgery. Anna signed off for the surgery without him and Dr. Joe Martin oversaw with the surgery. When David realized Leora was dying, he tried to enter the OR to save her life. Dr. Joe Marin had Tad, his adopted son, remove David from the operating room. Leora died and David blamed the Martins for her death. David was destroyed by Leora's death and he pushed everyone away. He began to see an imaginary five-year-old Leora, talking to this image. Weeks later, David and Anna fight and cry together, realizing they can not mourn for Leora without each other. As they fall to the floor holding each other, a little girl is seen at the doorway (un-seen) by them. She smiles to herself and walks out of the cabin, shutting the door behind her. After discovering evidence that David may have been involved in Michael Cambias' death, Anna goes to David's cabin. Her intention is to leave the evidence and a note. David enters before she could leave. She tells him she is going to Paris to be with Robin and she does not want him to follow her. Anna then walks out the door and David's life.

In the early summer 2004, David is stunned to learn that he has a daughter in the form of Pine Valley newcomer Babe Carey, the wife of JR Chandler and mother of "Bess Chandler" (who David had discovered was actually Miranda Montgomery). Babe is the product of a one-night stand with Krystal Carey when he was a student in medical school, and he was completely unaware that the liaison resulted in a child. David loves Babe from the moment he learns she is his child, and even though he helps cover up Babe's lie concerning the true identity of "Bess", his relationship with her is always rocky. His willingness to cover up Babe's deception severely damages his relationship with the Kane women, with whom he had almost always been close. His crimes concerning the baby switch also cost him his medical license for quite some time, and he is forced to perform community service at Pine Valley Hospital as a janitor. Despite this, David is pleased when Bianca gets her baby back and that Babe's son, AJ Chandler, is actually alive.

Towards the end of his second stint in Pine Valley, David exudes hatred for Zach Slater (and it was reciprocated) due to Zach's involvement in Dixie Martin's life. David left Pine Valley in the fall of 2006 after making a video exposing many of his enemies' secrets and leaving it for interested parties to see. Several Pine Valley residents, including Tad Martin and his son Jamie, consider the possibility that David is the serial killer who murdered Simone Torres and Erin Lavery, and attempted to murder Danielle Frye. The killer, also known as "The Satin Slayer", is later revealed to be Alexander Cambias Sr.

=== 2008–2010 ===
David returns to Pine Valley in the fall of 2008. Having been hiding in the tunnels of the Chandler mansion, he first reveals himself right after a series of tornadoes strike the town. He is grief-stricken to learn that his daughter Babe has died as a result of injuries sustained during the natural disaster. Blaming the Chandlers (and, to a lesser extent, Tad) for Babe's death, he decides to seek revenge by gaining custody of Babe's son, AJ. Later, David uses Amanda Dillon to get revenge on JR, knowing that the two of them are friends and Amanda was a good friend of Babe's.

Amanda becomes pregnant with David's child. Initially, she passes the baby off as JR's, but David later finds out the truth. Amanda gets help from Jake Martin to keep David away. Jake ends up falling in love with Amanda, much to David's chagrin. He tries to stop their marriage, but he ends up bound and gagged while they exchange vows. On June 12, 2009, Amanda gives birth to a healthy baby boy, David's son. David tracks her and Jake down at a clinic and they let David believe that their son died, which sends David into despair.

On August 7, 2009, his daughter, Marissa Tasker, the newly discovered twin sister to his late daughter Babe, is shot. When he goes in for her surgery, he hesitates, saying that he keeps seeing Leora in her place. He makes a vow to Krystal that he will make sure that no one in Pine Valley will hurt their daughter again, seeing as she is the only daughter he has left.

On August 28, David kidnaps Liza and gets her to admit that his son with Amanda is alive and that she (Liza) knows and helped keep him from his son, with the help of Jake, Tad and eventually Amanda. On August 31, while talking with Liza, David realizes his son with Amanda is missing.

David threatens to have Amanda, Jake, and anyone involved with the plan arrested while he raises their son, Trevor, on his own. Instead, he blackmails Amanda into living with him and their son, Trevor, despite her marriage with Jake. David makes a contract with Amanda which lets her move out his house and share custody of their son if she agrees to have another baby with him through artificial insemination.

In November 2009, David also finds out that Trevor is not his son, but he doesn't tell Amanda and instead lets her believe he is dying from a rare blood disease and has six months to live. Amanda finds out in January 2010 that Jake is Trevor's biological father, getting rid of David from their lives permanently. Meanwhile, Ryan Lavery discovers Greenlee's medical records on David's computer, who claims he was using them for research into Amanda Dillon's pregnancy. It is later revealed that David has been keeping Greenlee in Massachusetts while she recovers.

Greenlee has been comatose for the past year and has no memory of the accident. Upon her awakening, David tells Greenlee that she is paralyzed and if she does not have surgery to fix her spine, she will remain paralyzed for the rest of her life. She tells David that she wants to do the surgery, but if she dies during surgery, not to tell anybody that she was alive before her death. After successfully recovering from her injuries, Greenlee attempts to visit Ryan but is surprised to see him having sex with Erica. Out for revenge, Greenlee asks David to bring her a hard-drive hidden in Ryan's house. She puts the hard-drive into Fusion's computer and it crashes all the files. Even with Fusion's files being lost, Erica is set out to build Fusion back up once again, and on an interview she tells reporters that whoever crashed Fusion's computers, hasn't destroyed the company. Greenlee feels that she hasn't done enough and decides to stay in Pine Valley. Greenlee asks David to marry her, hoping that when she walks down the aisle at her wedding, everyone will be surprised, and that Ryan will be hurt. Gayle wants to make David pay for what he's done and Erica promises they'll do just that. Erica lays it out for David, telling him she wants him to marry Greenlee, get her out of town and away from Fusion or else. Erica orders David to marry Greenlee, get her to hand Fusion over to Erica and leave town or else Erica will use nurse Gayle to expose David's illegal deeds. Erica reminds David of their deal; marry Greenlee, get her out of town and allow Erica to have Fusion or else David goes to jail. David and Greenlee are pronounced husband and wife. On February 25, 2010, David and Greenlee get married at Wild Wind in secret. David admits to Greenlee that he teamed up with Erica to try to take Fusion from her because she was blackmailing him. David insists to Greenlee they'll work together to double-cross Erica, which Erica overhears.

Greenlee and Erica's battle gets even more heated until Erica cheats by making sure Greenlee can't use her packaging. In retaliation, Greenlee sets up Erica for siphoning money from the Miranda Center to her Fusion Glam line with David's help. David also sabotages Erica's plane believing it would delay her just long enough for Greenlee to step in as leader with the scandal being out. This plan backfires with Erica's plane crashing due to her being in a hurry and not checking for any problems with the plane. David is now covering up the fact that he and his mechanic sabotaged his plane while Greenlee is in the dark about Erica's plane.

Eventually, Greenlee finds out and though initially mad and tense with David she forgives him and is grateful for David's devotion towards her. Greenlee and David's relationship becomes more tumultuous after the two continuously get caught lying to one another; Greenlee also begins growing closer to Ryan (after he suffers a brain aneurysm she is the one who brings Ryan to the hospital) which David greatly resents. Greenlee eventually has a change of heart about her marriage and tells David that she needs time apart. David requests a last dinner with her, during which he tells Greenlee he has framed her for the Miranda Center scandal and Erica's plane crash. David calls himself "a husband trying to hold on to his wife" and threatens to use this against Greenlee if she leaves him.

On September 7, 2010, David collapses during Caleb's party at the Yacht Club. He was pronounced dead at the scene. Jesse Hubbard must team up with new Liza as his new DA to investigate his murder. Several accusations are made, targeting such people as Asher Pike and Ryan. Greenlee and Marissa both break down into tears. No one knows who the murderer is yet.

On September 13, 2010, the medical examiner tells Greenlee that David's autopsy reveals he didn't die of trauma or from a fight, but was poisoned with the drug Digitalis. Greenlee is soon put on trial for her husband's murder.

On November 22, 2010, just as Greenlee is sentenced to life in prison for David's death, David shows up in court. He takes the stand and says that he faked his own death to keep Ryan Lavery from Greenlee, and that he managed the deception by bribing the medical examiner. If he couldn't have Greenlee, he says, he wasn't going to let Ryan be with her. His plan all along was for Ryan to appear to have killed him, but he chose to return when he discovered that Greenlee was accused instead. Marissa slaps and verbally attacks him for leaving her, while Kendall explodes and blames him for setting things in motion that led to Zach's death. Greenlee is acquitted, and David is promptly arrested.

On November 29, 2010, David escapes the prison transport and attacks Ryan at his house with the intent to kill him and kidnap Greenlee. In the ensuing struggle, David is shot in the back by Erica.

It is revealed that Madison North was hit by a stray bullet during the fight. Though David survives the gunshot, he is left comatose, while Erica faces an attempted murder charge. Later, Kendall, devastated to the point of irrationality by Zach's death, impulsively tries to smother David at the hospital, but is stopped by Griffin Castillo.

=== 2011 ===
On January 3, 2011, it is revealed that it was actually Kendall who shot David, but she repressed her memories of the incident. On January 17, 2011, David wakes up shortly after Tad convinces Liza to drop the charges against Erica. David reveals to Erica that he knows it was Kendall who shot him. Upon discovering David's awakening, Marissa offers to be his defense attorney and hopefully get him to turn over a new leaf, but assures her father that if he doesn't do exactly as she says, she will see to it personally that he is thrown in prison.

Later, Greenlee visits David in the hospital with divorce papers. Upon realizing that his selfish refusal to let Greenlee go resulted in the needless suffering of several people, including Zach's death and his own bullet wound, David agrees to sign the papers.

Ryan, wanting David in jail by his and Greenlee's wedding day, kidnaps David out of his room and sets him up to make it appear as though he is attempting a getaway, after which he is promptly arrested and thrown in jail by Jesse. However, he manages to convince Marissa of the setup. Using his one phone call to contact Kendall, David gets her to come to the police station. In the ensuing confrontation, Kendall begins to suffer from respiratory distress and passes out. After convincing Jesse and Greenlee to temporarily release him in order to help Kendall, David revives her, and she is rushed to the hospital, where it is revealed that Kendall is suffering from an aortic aneurysm and needs heart surgery to survive. After David talks Griffin through an emergency surgery on Kendall inside an ambulance, Erica convinces the Governor to grant David a pardon for his crimes in exchange for him not revealing the truth about the shooting. Marissa takes this opportunity to hopefully ease hostility towards David in town.

Later, when an increasingly unstable Annie kidnaps Emma during Ryan and Greenlee's wedding, Jesse finds a picture from the night of the kidnapping that depicts David and Annie together. When the direct approach fails, Ryan tricks him into admitting his guilt in a set-up. David is further shocked when Ryan informs him that Annie is the one who attacked and nearly killed Marissa at the Chandler Mansion. At that moment, Marissa, having been informed of the situation by Greenlee, arrives and threatens to turn David in unless he reveals Emma's whereabouts. David tells them that Annie and Emma are in a cabin in Vermont, and insists that he merely thought that Annie was taking Emma on vacation while Ryan and Greenlee were on their honeymoon. Despite David's attempts to defend himself, Marissa, having completely given up on him now, coldly states she is done with him before storming off. Ryan takes this opportunity to (arrogantly) taunt David, snidely declaring that, while they both may have lost their daughters, at least he (Ryan) is getting his back; only to discover that Annie has gotten away with Emma, as he is unable to find them.

On March 3, 2011, David approaches Ryan and Greenlee and offers to help them track down Annie and Emma, and they reluctantly accept. However, David later admits to Greenlee that he needs an "image overhaul" and helping them find Emma may be just what he needs to get his medical license back and hopefully win back some good favor with Marissa.

While David is laying low he has a series of flings with Liza Colby, as she has also recently been publicly humiliated and shunned as it was revealed that she slept with her daughter's boyfriend.

When Erica returns from being kidnapped on the eve of her wedding, David is the only one in Pine Valley who realizes that Erica is not herself, but a double, Jane Campbell. They have a relationship in which she falls in love with David and he convinces her, as Erica, to buy Pine Valley Hospital for him. When Jane finally releases the real Erica from her kidnapping, Erica returns to Pine Valley and is disgusted with what Jane has done to her life; including her involvement with David. On July 25, 2011, David is stabbed by Erica in an angry rage. David arrived at the hospital in critical condition. Jake and Griffin realized that David would require emergency surgery to repair the internal bleeding. David insisted that Griffin perform the surgery. According to David, Griffin was the only person who was capable of repairing the damage. David warned Griffin, before the surgery, that if he didn't survive then "all of them would die".

In the final days of the ABC version of All My Children, David is involved with Cara Castillo, who is carrying his child. In the final episode, David is in the Chandler mansion during Stuart's welcome home party. Despite being the one to bring Stuart back from the dead, and Adam being responsible for Stuart's death, Adam tells David he is unwelcome and pays him to leave.

=== 2013 ===
In April 2013, in the revived All My Children, David is released from prison, where he served five years for shooting JR Chandler after he (JR) shot and killed David's daughter, Marissa. David returns to Pine Valley to seek answers about the miscarriage of his baby with Cara and finds JR still in a coma from when David shot him five years prior.

=== Project Orpheus ===
As David regained consciousness, it was revealed to Griffin that Project Orpheus was not just theoretical, but that David had been experimenting on patients.

Griffin told Ryan that Maria may have been brought back from the dead as a part of Orpheus. Greenlee speculated that Leo could have been part of Orpheus as well. She had David take her to his secret lab to find out if Leo was still alive. David drugged Greenlee and when she awoke she believed she saw Leo; after reuniting with Leo it was revealed that this was just a dream. Instead, it was revealed that Zach was alive and had been part of Orpheus as well.

While David was recovering from his stab wounds; Dixie escaped from David's lab and found her way back to Pine Valley. It was later revealed that she had also been kept alive as a part of the Project.

Dr. David Hayward brought back the following people from the dead as part of Project Orpheus;

- Dixie Cooney (died in January 2007; brought back on May 17, 2011) – alive.
- Greenlee Smythe (died in February 2009; brought back on December 23, 2009) – alive.
- Maria Santos (died in August 1997; brought back in May 2002) – alive.
- Zach Slater (died in November 2010; brought back on August 5, 2011) – alive.
- Stuart Chandler (died in May 2009; brought back on September 21, 2011) – alive.
