= Cortlandt/Cooney family =

Fictional family on All My Children

- All My Children family
- First appearance: 1979
- Last appearance: September 2, 2013
- Created by: Agnes Nixon
- Introduced by: Jorn Winther
- Duration: 1979–2011, 2013

The Cortlandt/Cooney family is a fictional family on the original ABC daytime soap opera, All My Children.

== Family members ==
=== First Generation ===
- Palmer Cortlandt [born Pete Cooney] (died 2010) - Bess's older brother.
  - Lottie Chandler (deceased) - Palmer's lover, Ross's mother and sister of Adam and Stuart Chandler.
  - Daisy Cortlandt - Palmer's first wife and mother of Nina.
  - Opal Cortlandt - Palmer's ex-wife and mother of Petey.
  - Cynthia Preston - Palmer's ex-wife and mother of Andrew.
- Bess Cooney-Hunkle (deceased) - Palmer's younger sister, Dixie, Will, and Melanie's mother, Paul Hunkle's wife.
  - Paul Hunkle
- Unknown Cooney (deceased) - Palmer and Bess's sibling and Caleb's mother or father.

=== Second Generation ===
- Ross Chandler
  - Ellen Shepard
- Nina Cortlandt
  - Cliff Warner
- Andrew Preston-Cortlandt (adopted by Palmer)
- Pete Cortlandt (born 1992)
- Dixie Cooney Martin (born 1962)
  - Adam Chandler
  - Tad Martin
- Will Cortlandt (died 1992)
  - Hayley Vaughan
- Melanie "Lanie" Cortlandt-Rampal
  - David Rampal
- Caleb Cortlandt
  - Sonia Reyes (deceased)

=== Third Generation ===
- Julie Rand Chandler (adopted daughter of Ross and Ellen)
  - Nico Kelly
- Robert "Bobby" Warner (born 1981; Nina's adopted son)
  - Kate Jefferson
  - Anita Santos
- Michael Warner (born 1987)
- Adam "JR" Chandler, Jr. (born 1989 revised to 1983)
  - Babe Carey
  - Marissa Tasker
- Asher Pike
- Kathleen Martin

=== Fourth Generation ===
- Sam Grey (born 1996 revised to 1990)
- Adam Chandler III (born 2004 revised to 1997) [JR's son with Babe later adopted by Marissa]

== Family tree ==
=== Cooney ===
- Palmer Cortlandt (died 2010) [Born Pete Cooney]
  - a. Charlotte "Lottie" Chandler (deceased)
    - c. Ross Chandler
  - m. Daisy Murdoch [divorced]
    - c. Nina Cortlandt
  - m. Donna Beck [divorced 1981]
  - m. Cynthia Preston [married 1985; divorced]
    - c. Andrew Preston-Cortlandt (adopted by Palmer)
  - m. Natalie Marlowe [divorced]
  - m. Daisy Murdoch [divorced]
  - m. Opal Purdy [married 1990; divorced 1998]
    - c. Pete Cortlandt (born 1992)
  - m. Vanessa Bennett [married 2000; divorced]
- Bess Cooney (deceased)
  - m. Paul "Seabone" Hunkle
    - c. William "Will" Cortlandt (died 1992)
      - m. Hayley Vaughan [married 1992]
    - c. Dixie Cooney (born 1963)
      - m. Adam Chandler Sr. [married 1989; invalid]
        - c. Adam "JR" Chandler, Jr. (born 1989 revised 1983)
          - m. Babe Carey [2003; invalid]
            - c. Adam "AJ" Chandler, III (born 2004 revised 1997)
          - m. Babe Carey [married 2004; divorced 2005]
          - m. Babe Carey [married 2006; divorced 2007]
          - m. Marissa Tasker (Born 1983)[married 2009]
            - c. AJ Chandler (adopted by Marissa)
      - m. Tad Martin ( Born 1963) [married 1989; divorced 1990]
      - m. Craig Lawson [divorced]
      - m. Brian Bodine [married 1992; divorced 1993]
      - m. Tad Martin [married 1994; divorced 1996]
      - m. Tad Martin [married 1999; divorced 2002]
        - c. Unnamed daughter (miscarriage)
        - c. Katherine "Kathy" Martin (born 2002)
    - c. Melanie "Lanie" Cortlandt
      - m. David Rampal [married 1992]
- Unknown Cooney (deceased)
  - m. Unknown person (deceased)
    - c. Caleb Cortlandt
      - m. Sonia Reyes (deceased; 1990)
        - c. Asher Pike (born 1990)
