= Greenlee Smythe =

Fictional character from All My Children

- All My Children character
- Rebecca Budig as Greenlee Smythe
- Portrayed by: Rebecca Budig (1999–2005, 2008–2011); Sabine Singh (2007–2008)
- Duration: 1999–2005; 2007–2011
- First appearance: August 11, 1999
- Last appearance: September 23, 2011
- Created by: Agnes Nixon, Elizabeth Page and Jean Passanante
- Introduced by: Jean Dadario Burke (1999); Julie Hanan Carruthers (2007)
- Sabine Singh as Greenlee Smythe
In-universe information
- Other names: Greenlee Smythe du'Pres (former married name); Greenlee Smythe Lavery (current married name); Tammy Smith
- Occupation: Hospital owner; Businesswoman; Landlord; Personal assistant; Website designer; Production assistant
- Parents: Jackson Montgomery; Mary Smythe
- Stepfather: Roger Smythe
- Siblings: Reggie Montgomery (adoptive); Lily Montgomery (adoptive)
- Spouse: Leo du Pres (2002); Ryan Lavery (2004–2007, 2011–present); Aidan Devane (2008–2009); David Hayward (2010–2011)
- Stepchildren: Emma Lavery (2006–2007, 2011–); Spike Lavery (2006–2007, 2011–)
- Grandparents: Woodruff Greenlee; Millicent Greenlee
- Aunts and uncles: Travis Montgomery; Christine Montgomery
- First cousins: Bianca Montgomery; Molly Montgomery; Sean Montgomery
- Other relatives: Miranda Montgomery; Gabrielle Montgomery

Greenlee Smythe is a fictional character from the American daytime drama, All My Children. She was originally portrayed by actress Rebecca Budig from August 11, 1999 to November 30, 2005, and was portrayed by actress Sabine Singh from April 20, 2007 to January 15, 2008. On December 14, 2007, it was announced that Budig accepted the offer to reprise the role, and would continue her portrayal of the character. Episodes with Budig began airing again January 16, 2008. The return is one of the most widely reported in the genre's history, with newspapers such as the Associated Press and New York Daily News featuring the story. Budig again departed the role on February 17, 2009, the day the character was killed off. In the June 29, 2009 issue of ABC Soaps in Depth magazine, head writer Charles Pratt, Jr. confirmed they had written Greenlee to remain alive, but that Budig would be making no immediate plans to return to the show. On October 8, 2009, it was confirmed that Budig would return to the show in December. Budig returned on December 23, 2009 and remained with the series until its finale on September 23, 2011.

Greenlee became one of daytime television's top bad girls, but later reformed into a heroine. The character's relationships with Ryan Lavery and Kendall Hart feature prominently in her storyline. She is noted as the last currently-airing, major daytime character to be created by show creator Agnes Nixon.

== Background ==
=== Casting and character creation ===
When producers at All My Children were looking for a new villainess to wreak havoc in fictional town Pine Valley, they created character Greenlee Smythe, inspired by the likes of Erica Kane (Susan Lucci) and Kendall Hart (Sarah Michelle Gellar). Executives at ABC were already considering actress Rebecca Budig for the role. Budig, who felt that becoming the character was a great opportunity to expand her range as an actress, sent the show her video reel.

On August 11, 1999, Greenlee Smythe made her debut. After winning the role, Budig further explained her interest in the part and her early portrayal of the character: "This was a recurring role", she stated. "I didn't have to go in and test - the process proceeded swiftly".

Judy Blye Wilson, AMC casting director told me that Greenlee was a bad girl who comes to Pine Valley and causes trouble. It was the summer; I figured there wasn't going to be anything going on in L.A. - why not go back to New York? Plus, I never get to play the bad girl and delve into the dark side. I'm always playing the good girl. It's been exciting because the role has really come to fruition these past three months. Her dad's a drunk, her mother pays no attention to her, she lives with her grandmother - she's pathetically desperate, kind of like me. I'm kidding. I love her name; it's so debutante. I think she's going to continue to be a spoiler.

The character later went from recurring status to being a main character. Budig immediately accepted the commitment of being a contract player, saying that she was "very happy" at All My Children. "I don't even know how to describe it; it's just been a really nice experience for me. I'm friendly with everyone", she stated. "I have to tell you, I am in love with Judy Blye Wilson and Jean Dadario Burke [AMC's executive producer]. Jean is like my mother, and Judy is like my best friend. It's been really nice to be around people like that". Budig additionally noted her favoritism for Jennifer Bassey (Marian). "She's taken me under her wing a little bit. She's teaching me all sorts of things. I just look at the people on the show and I'm so amazed. There are so many people to learn from there", stated Budig.

Wilson's take on bringing in Budig as Greenlee hinged on her belief that it was a no-brainer. Wilson had been trying to get Budig at All My Children for years. "She went on to Guiding Light about two weeks before I was going to bring her in to read for the part", stated Wilson. "Since then I'd spoken to her several times and tried to encourage her to come here, and this time we got lucky. I think she's a terrific young lady and a wonderful actress, and I'm really happy that we have her here at ABC".

Wilson felt that Budig brought a special mix of qualities to the table, detailing that "she has this unique way of playing the bad girl, if you will, but making her very likable". Wilson elaborated on Budig's way of showing vulnerability: "You love to watch this bad girl, and that's not an easy thing to make people do. As a person, Rebecca has this wonderful kind of spunky, upbeat quality that is endearing. I've always liked this girl, and enjoyed spending time with her. She's just a lot of fun".

When describing the feeling of portraying a vixen, Budig also used the word fun; she cited her kinship with the character and how it differs from her role on Guiding Light. "Michelle was young and naive. I'm sure I'm still a little naive, but it's hard for an actor who's older to play younger", said Budig. "You have to go back to being somewhat innocent, and it's hard once you're not to go back to being that way. Greenlee's worldly and naughty, and I can relate more to her - not that I'm a naughty girl", she added with humor.

=== Recast and Budig return ===
In early 2007, nearly two years after Budig left the role in 2005, the writers decided to recast Greenlee. Actress Sabine Singh was selected to step into the role after Budig turned down the offer to return. Viewers, at first, had a difficult time embracing a new actress as the character. There was sentiment that the new Greenlee was "too whiny" and too self-defeatist to be the strong, independent Greenlee they had become accustomed to. Singh, however, managed to gain a fanbase for her portrayal, having made the character somewhat recognizable to viewers again.

New head writers of the series, James Harmon Brown and Barbara Esensten, in their interview with TV Guide, stated that they helped Singh get into the role by "writing specifically" for her. "We saw some little things in Sabine Singh (Greenlee), so we wrote for her accordingly", stated Esensten, "but you get into real trouble when you completely change the character for a recast. Luckily, Jim and I don't have any trouble separating the actor from a character because the latter is really paramount in our eyes".

With recasts becoming more frequent on the canvas, the audience longed for more familiarity, and often cited old favorites and their portrayals of beloved or hated characters. In late 2007, All My Children again sought to bring back Budig as Greenlee. This time, their offer was accepted; on December 12, 2007, it was announced that Budig would be returning to the role. The announcement was prominently featured in major news outlets. Budig again departed from the role of Greenlee in March 2009; she cited the difficulty of her bicoastal lifestyle with husband Bob Guiney as her reason for the exit. All My Children new head writer Charles Pratt, Jr. said to ABC Soaps in Depth, "I have great belief that someday, at some point, Greenlee will want to come back, and we'll be primed and ready for her".

==== Controversy ====
When viewers received news that Budig would be returning to the role following Singh's departure, they were initially pleased; they had been against the network's decision to recast Greenlee and slow to embrace Singh as the character. "Fans were quite vocal", stated All My Children spokesman Michael Cohen. "They wanted Rebecca back as Greenlee. When the timing is right, as it was now, Rebecca was available so we brought her back". Though welcomed back by fans, news of her return was largely overshadowed by reports of what transpired in releasing Singh. "Sabine was fired!" said a note on a MySpace page claiming affiliation with Singh's fan club:

She was given a week to leave quietly and told that Rebecca was coming back. Supposedly Brian Frons had been in talks with [Budig] since before Thanksgiving, this is why [Singh] was invited to SSW, then had her invitation taken from her. The cast just found out yesterday and they are all in shock. Sabine herself didn't even see it coming, for months [show execs] kept telling her how amazing she was and she should look forward to another contract after her four years were up, and then BAM!

Fans were outraged and conflicted by the news. Viewers pleased with Budig's return now felt emotions of guilt and bitterness; they cited their eagerness for Budig to return while also feeling that they could not fully enjoy it. Viewers who had come to accept Singh as the "bad girl" were disheartened, and both sides felt Singh was treated unfairly. The controversy heightened when ABC ran advertisements promoting Budig's return, claiming that "the real Greenlee is back". This move was seen by viewers as disrespectful to Singh's portrayal, particularly because she was still filming. Fans expressed the network could have had more tact in letting Singh go and that it did not have to unfold the way it did.

Of her return, Budig said the reason she decided to take the offer was because of timing. She stated that her life is in Los Angeles, and that ABC did a lot to make the transition easier for her. Viewers reasoned that Singh's treatment by ABC was not Budig's fault, since she had been approached by Frons himself and could not have known exactly what would transpire in the upcoming weeks. When asked of Singh, Budig praised her work but seemed aware of how the writers had altered Greenlee's character and of the audience's dissatisfaction with the change; in response to this, she hinted that this issue would not be the case with her return. "I think [Sabine] brought in a different perspective on the character", she said. "Obviously, I played this character for six years and I have a different take on Greenlee".

Singh commented on her departure in the subsequent issue of Soap Opera Digest; she said she did not know who the person claiming affiliation with her fan club was but that the information provided was mostly accurate. She later detailed her feelings in full:

It has been a difficult week and a shocking, most unexpected turn of events. My fellow cast and crew members held me up through my last week of work, where I shot scenes and said lines that were no longer mine. This was difficult news to receive the week before Christmas, which made it even harder to tell my family. I am so sad to have lost a job I loved so much, and I am sad at how much this hurts my amazingly supportive family. Ultimately, I would like to thank All My Children for the opportunities they provided me, but most especially, I want to thank them because I was able to meet and work with such remarkable, extraordinary people.

Singh further relayed that there was "one thing" that kept her clearheaded and strong throughout the matter — her friends, on and off set. She said "the amazing AMC fans, [who] have been nothing short of supportive, loving and giving on my behalf". Co-star Cameron Mathison (Ryan Lavery) praised her work: "She made a lot of sacrifices for the show and did a great job. We'll miss her around here."

== Storylines ==
=== Leo and widowhood ===
Greenlee Smythe is a young upper class woman from one of Pine Valley's richest families. She has an affair with Scott Chandler at college, and wants to resume it when they return home to Pine Valley. Scott, however, has fallen for Becca Tyree, and Greenlee makes sure Becca sees a video of the former lovers having sex. When Becca ends things with Scott, he initially reunites with Greenlee, though he ultimately ends it when he discovers her scheme.

After her quest to win Scott ends, Greenlee turns her attention to Ryan Lavery. Ryan is in love with Gillian Andrassy, but pursues a sexual relationship with Greenlee. During this time, Greenlee meets fellow schemer Leo du Pres, and the fast friends go so far to make a bet to see if Leo can take Becca's virginity. Greenlee continues to pursue Ryan even as she and Leo are growing closer. Greenlee and Leo would eventually make love, but both insist that it did not mean anything and they go back to their pursuit of Ryan and Becca. When Ryan steals $3 million from his internet company, Greenlee covers for him, by borrowing the money from loan shark Wade Randall. Wade attempts to use his leverage with Greenlee by threatening her grandfather, hoping to have Greenlee convince her grandfather to help him launder his dirty money. When she learns that Ryan took the money to help Gillian rescue Jake Martin from war-torn Chechnya, she turns him in to the police cuts her ties with him.

As this is all happening, Greenlee and Leo's feelings for each other continue to deepen and they finally admit that they have fallen in love with each other. The road to romance starts out rocky, with the two of them ending up in many misunderstandings. During one of Greenlee's attempts to win him back after a fight, Greenlee and Leo inadvertently learn that Leo's friend, Bianca Montgomery is a lesbian. Greenlee promptly nicknames the young woman LesBianca. Jealous of his friendships with Bianca and Laura English, a drugged Greenlee pushes Laura off a yacht, while a horrified Bianca looks on. In order to silence her, Greenlee threatens to tell Bianca's mother, Erica Kane, that Bianca is gay. Greenlee later makes good on her threat and publicly outs Bianca. Leo finds out and ends his relationship with Greenlee, although the two eventually reconcile. When Greenlee proposes to Leo, he accepts, though he is worried that she will find out that his original interest in her was to steal her trust fund. Although he no longer cares about the money and is truly in love with her, Greenlee feels too betrayed to believe Leo when she learns the truth and breaks up with him.

Erica hires Greenlee to work at her company, Enchantment, in an attempt to drive her daughter's tormentor out of town. Greenlee proves herself to be an asset, and also realizes that she wants to reunite with Leo, who is now engaged to a dying Laura. After Laura receives a heart transplant, Leo finds himself trapped in a loveless marriage. Greenlee attempts to move on with Jake while Leo is married to Laura. Greenlee moved in with Jake into his apartment, and Jake was her friend and someone she could lean on and trust. Jake fell in love with Greenlee and the two began dating, and Greenlee also realizes she loves Jake as well. Greenlee and Jake were dating for a while. However, she and Leo still loved each other and eventually reunited again. Leo proposes to Greenlee in the elevator while being trapped with Jake and Laura. She helps Erica run Enchantment after Erica is arrested for murdering Leo's cousin Frankie Stone, a young woman who was romantically involved with Bianca. After Erica is cleared of murder charges, Greenlee attempts to help Leo get his mother, Vanessa Bennett, out of his life. Vanessa drugs Greenlee and Jake and sets them off on a sinking boat. Vanessa also steals Greenlee's engagement ring and leaves it at Leo and Greenlee's apartment, making Leo think that Greenlee has left him for Jake. Leo believes Greenlee has made her choice of who she wants to be with. Jake reveals to Greenlee he is still in love with her and they kissed while still stranded on the island, but her unwillingness to commit to Jake leads Jake to walk away from her for good and move on with his life. Vanessa is arrested but is only sent to a mental health facility because she seems to have developed alternate personalities. Vanessa escapes and kidnaps Greenlee at the Valley Inn, holding her at knifepoint before a crowded room that includes Leo. The incident helps Greenlee and Leo realize what's important and the two reunite and get engaged again.

Her upcoming wedding to Leo brings Greenlee's mother, Mary Smythe, back into her life. But she does not know that Mary is only pretending to care about her so as not to be cut out of the family will. Greenlee brokers a deal to work at Revlon, and wants to pay back Erica for her attempts at holding her back by working her hardest for the competition. Leo is embroiled in the case to find Vanessa's missing drug money and has charges of tampering with evidence against him that prohibit him from leaving town. Worries that Vanessa and her drug money could spoil the wedding become founded when a former associate of Vanessa's kills Greenlee's father at the wedding. When Greenlee learns that Mary is only being kind to her so her grandfather will put Mary back into his will, Greenlee cuts her off and her dependency on Leo intensifies. The two plan to move to Paris and have a happily ever after once they can turn over Vanessa's drug money and get the charges against Leo dropped. One of Vanessa's supposed alternate personalities reveals to them the coordinates of the missing money, which turns out to be all worthless stocks, and Leo becomes free to take Greenlee to Paris. Before they depart, a deranged Vanessa kidnaps Greenlee and orders Leo to find a stash of diamonds for her. Vanessa, who was also responsible for Frankie's murder, arranges for Leo to give her the diamonds near a cliff overlooking a river. But even once Leo retrieves her diamonds, it becomes clear that Vanessa has no intention of letting Greenlee live. After struggling with control of Vanessa's gun, Greenlee is left hanging over the edge of the cliff. Vanessa begins shooting at a terrified Greenlee, but Leo rushes at his mother to save his wife. Leo and Vanessa continue to fight over the gun, and the two plunge into the river apparently dying. Trey Kenyon is able to pull a devastated Greenlee to safety. Greenlee cannot come to grips with life without Leo and wants to kill herself on multiple occasions, but she is able to go on with the help and support of her brother-in-law, David Hayward.

While mourning, Greenlee decides to form a new cosmetics company to rival Enchantment. Enlisting the partnership of Simone Torres, Kendall Hart, Liza Colby, and Mia Saunders, she creates Fusion Cosmetics. With the aid of a therapist and the encouragement of her friends, she attempts to move back into the dating scene. Trey attempts to start a relationship with her, but she is not interested. She does begin to develop romantic feelings for Fusion's handyman Carlos Reyes, who has been sending her romantic poems anonymously through the company's email system. She is able to forgive him when she learns his sister actually wrote the poems, but the relationship ends when Greenlee manipulates his friend Diane Lacey, owner of Lacey's department store, to help the company.

After Carlos quits to go work for Stuart Chandler's art gallery, Greenlee becomes infatuated with Juan Pablo Ruiz de Vasquez, Carlos' wealthy brother, who invests in Fusion. Her mother attempts to rekindle an old relationship with Erica's fiancée Jackson Montgomery, eventually revealing that he is really Greenlee's father. When she attempts to cut Mary out of her life, Juan Pablo supports her. He is again able to support her when Michael Cambias attempts a hostile takeover of Fusion. Juan Pablo is forced to push Greenlee away when an Argentinian gang targets him and Carlos. Carlos is eventually killed, and Juan Pablo leaves town to avenge his brother's death.

Greenlee and Ryan become close again, while an unstable Michael Cambias rapes Bianca and marries Kendall, Bianca's half-sister. After Michael is murdered, Kendall claims to be pregnant with his child. Skeptical, Greenlee becomes obsessed with proving it to be a lie, and when Kendall is put on trial for Michael's murder, she barges in on them and rips off Kendall's dress to reveal a fake pregnancy pad. She is stricken to learn that the ruse was designed to help Bianca, who really was pregnant with her rapist's child. Additionally, because of her antics at the trial, Greenlee has only succeeded in making Kendall the prime suspect in the murder and herself a social outcast and an object of hatred for most of Pine Valley, both of which she had not counted on.

Furious and disgusted, Ryan leaves Greenlee outside of town, where she falls down a mineshaft. Ryan eventually rescues her and nurses her back to health, while a traumatized Bianca remembers that she killed Michael in self-defense. After she is cleared of murder charges, Bianca and Greenlee become close. After thinking she lost her daughter Miranda, Bianca is pleased when Greenlee gives her a necklace that belonged to Leo. She wears it when she leaves for Paris with Maggie Stone and her Miranda, whose death had been faked.

=== Back to Ryan ===
Though Kendall and Ryan are romantically involved, Greenlee continues to be a factor in their relationship. After Michael's death, Ryan is named the head of Cambias Industries by Alexander Cambias. Out of revenge for Greenlee's courtroom antics, Kendall takes advantage of a clause inserted by Bianca during her time as C.E.O. to bar Greenlee from working at Fusion. Angered with Kendall's manipulations, Ryan decides to marry Greenlee, since as his wife the clause would be void. Despite Kendall's interference, their old romantic feelings resurface and they are married. Greenlee begins experiencing blurred vision, loss of impulse control, and fugue states. Though they seek treatment, her erratic behavior continues, culminating in her nearly falling off the roof of the Fusion building while imagining a trapeze act. Kendall manages to save her friend, but she is also the first suspect when it is revealed that Greenlee was being poisoned with overdoses of an anti-psychotic drug. Recalling Kendall saving her life, Greenlee clears her and the two begin to repair their friendship.

Ryan's emotionally scarred brother Jonathan is suspected by Greenlee, but Jonathan claims their older brother Braden is the culprit. Braden had fled town years earlier to avoid being charged with the rape of Jackson Montgomery's sister, Christine, and Ryan vowed to find him. While Ryan is searching for Braden, Jonathan kidnaps Greenlee, Kendall and Lily Montgomery, and reveals that he actually is responsible for poisoning Greenlee, shooting Ryan, and murdering both Edmund Grey and Braden. Though Jonathan claimed to be trying to save Ryan, Ryan is forced to shoot his Jonathan, who is presumed dead. Greenlee thinks having a baby could help Ryan get over his losses, but fearing his family's violent past, Ryan chooses to have a vasectomy. She learns that Ryan has donated sperm years earlier, and with Leo's brother Dr. David Hayward's help, she steals the sperm from Dr. Greg Madden's fertility clinic.

Ryan continues to grow more volatile, culminating in nearly striking Greenlee when she reveals she is pregnant. Ryan speeds away on his motorcycle, driving it over a cliff. His body is never recovered and Greenlee is left to mourn another husband. Ryan, however has faked his death, and leaves town to protect his wife. After Greenlee miscarries, Kendall agrees to act as a surrogate for Greenlee, using Greenlee's egg and Ryan's sperm. After Kendall discovers she is pregnant, Greenlee decides to have a memorial service for Ryan, who chooses to reveal that he is alive. Furious that he would fake his death, Greenlee decides to divorce Ryan and keep the surrogacy secret so he will leave town. They begin to reconcile, but she is further betrayed when Ryan reveals that Jonathan is also alive and Ryan has been caring for him. She is further devastated when she learns the shocking truth about Kendall's pregnancy. Due to a blackout (that was caused by Kendall's husband, Zach) Greenlee's eggs were no longer viable. Kendall made the choice to use her own eggs in the implantation, making the baby Kendall and Ryan's child. Kendall fully intended to let Greenlee raise the baby as her own, and not tell her the truth. Greenlee confronts her in an emotional showdown at Thanksgiving. Feeling betrayed by both her husband and best friend, Greenlee leaves town.

=== Return ===
In 2007, Greenlee returns to Pine Valley and attempts to reunite with Ryan. She reclaims the shares of Fusion she gave to Babe Carey, a former foe of Kendall's, and eventually forces her out of the company. Babe had secured an important music deal with Zarf, and Greenlee is forced to rehire her, much to the delight of Ryan's new wife Annie Lavery and their friends Di Henry, Amanda Dillon and Kendall herself, who lauded Babe's achievements at Fusion in Grennlee's absence. Going against the rest of the women at Fusion, she supports Ava Benton as the "face of Fusion", and under her return profits skyrocket. She also learns that Kendall's new husband Zach Slater was responsible for a power outage the left her eggs not viable for implantation, and decides to sue for custody of the resulting child, Spike. Because she has no standing in court, Greenlee opts to kidnap the baby instead, but decides to return him to Kendall. In doing so she has a car wreck, that appears to leave Spike deaf. This incident further increases Greenlee's already bad reputation with the Pine Valley citizens.

Ryan cuts her out of his life, and Zach hires Aidan Devane to keep tabs on her. Aidan and Greenlee develop a romantic interest in each other, while Zach and Babe's husband JR Chandler scheme to have her leave town. She is able to help Ryan and Aidan avoid prosecution for the attempted murder of Annie's evil brother Richie Novak, and Erica and Jack's relationship comes to an end when Erica schemes to have Greenlee leave town as well. Ryan is able to forgive his ex-wife, but Kendall becomes obsessed with getting revenge on Greenlee for Spike's deafness, eventually plotting for months to make it appear as though Greenlee was planning to kidnap Spike again. Kendall pretends to be Greenlee's friend, all the while setting up fake evidence such as forging diary entries in her computer, before leaving Spike with Greenlee and calling the police on her. Tired of the feud, Greenlee decides to plead guilty, but Aidan helps her escape. While on the run, they are separated, and Greenlee finds herself trapped in a bomb shelter with Zach, who had been run over by Richie. The two enemies bond during their confinement, each saving the other's life.

Meanwhile, Dr. Joe Martin reveals to Ryan and Kendall that Spike's deafness was in fact due to a chromosomal abnormality and he would have lost his hearing regardless of the car accident, leaving Kendall horrified and guilt-ridden that she had gone out of her way to make Greenlee's life miserable for nothing. Aidan and Kendall, believing their loves dead, sleep together in their grief. After Kendall discovers a map with the shelter on it, and Aidan and Kendall are able to save Zach and Greenlee. Initially unconscious, Zach and Greenlee are rushed to the hospital, where Greenlee's heart stops. However, with Aidan's love and the support of her family and friends, Greenlee revives in a Christmas miracle. Zach and Kendall visit her while she is recuperating, and the three agree to be friends.

=== Fresh start ===
Despite everyone's opposition to the idea, Kendall testifies in court to the set-up and to the truth behind Spike's deafness, and Greenlee's testimony convinces the judge to let Kendall off on probation and with community service. Aidan and Greenlee love continues to grow stronger, though he feels guilty about sleeping with Kendall. She faces another medical crisis when her health is compromised from the water in the bomb shelter, and again briefly lapses into a coma. Aidan proposes, but a wary Greenlee initially turns him down before accepting. Zach sends Aidan on a mission to Darfur to rescue a doctor, who turns out to be Jake Martin, again trapped in a war torn country. Greenlee and Aidan's relationship is tested when she reveals she no longer wants to have children, but Aidan is able to move past his insecurities.

During Jesse Hubbard and Angie Baxter's wedding, Greenlee finds out from her father about Aidan and Kendall's one-night stand. She ends things with Aidan, and attempts to seduce Zach for revenge. She eventually agrees to forgive Aidan, but maintains that they can only be friends. After Richie is murdered, Aidan protects a nervous Greenlee, and the two agree to take a second chance at their relationship slowly.

Not long after, Greenlee has a boating accident when a sail hits her head. Ryan, who was unable to remember the last four years of his life because of amnesia, is able to rescue her, and in doing so recovers his memories of the love they once shared. Greenlee and Aidan are married, but when she uses a tainted bottle of perfume she admits on their honeymoon that she wants to have Ryan's baby still. Aidan leaves Greenlee, who helps Ryan rescue his daughter Emma from Annie, who has become increasingly unstable after she killed Richie. Ryan and Greenlee are both divorced and decide to reunite, and on December 30, 2008, he proposes. She initially turns him down, fearing Annie's increasingly psychotic threats against them, but ultimately accepts.

The two decide to marry on the same day as lesbian couple Reese Williams and Bianca Montgomery. Ryan convinces town psychic Opal Cortlandt to give Greenlee a fake reading saying their wedding will be fine, but Opal secretly believes that Greenlee could die. When Ryan sees Zach kissing Reese, he cancels the wedding so he won't have to share the day with Reese, who goes through with her wedding to Bianca. When Greenlee tries to confirm that Zach is having an affair with Reese, she drives off on her motorcycle to confront her friend. Kendall is driving on the same road with Zach, and the two are arguing about Reese as well. Kendall ends up in the wrong lane and nearly hits Greenlee, who drives off the road and crashes into a creek below. She washes away but is unknowingly recovered and secretly rehabilitated by David Hayward. When Ryan and Kendall arrive at the morgue, they see her engagement ring on a corpse's hand and assume it is her. Both grieving their loss, Ryan and Kendall sleep together. Ryan feels guilty, and Jack gives him a video that Greenlee made for him, where she states she wants him to be happy with or without her.

=== Return from the dead ===
Several months after her presumed death, Ryan receives a champagne flute from Greenlee. Realizing that no one ever actually identified the body, he comes to believe that Greenlee is still alive. In November 2009, Ryan discovers Greenlee's medical records on David's computer, who claims he was using them for research into Amanda Dillon's pregnancy. It is later revealed that David has been keeping Greenlee in Massachusetts while she recovers. Greenlee has been comatose for the past year and has no memory of the accident. Upon her awakening, David tells Greenlee that she is paralyzed and if she does not have surgery to fix her spine, she will remain paralyzed for the rest of her life. She tells David that she wants to do the surgery, but if she dies during surgery, not to tell anybody that she was alive before her death. After successfully recovering from her injuries, Greenlee attempts to visit Ryan but is surprised to see him having sex with Erica Kane. Out for revenge, Greenlee asks David to bring her a hard-drive hidden in Ryan's house. She puts the hard-drive into Fusion's computer and it crashes all the files. Even with Fusion's files being lost, Erica is set out to build Fusion back up once again; during an interview, she tells reporters that whoever crashed Fusion's computers has not destroyed the company. Greenlee feels that she has not done enough and decides to stay in Pine Valley. Greenlee asks David to marry her, hoping that when she walks down the aisle at her wedding, everyone will be surprised, and that Ryan will be hurt.

Greenlee reveals herself to Jack. Jack cannot believe his eyes when Greenlee appears before him. After explaining how David hid her away for a year, Greenlee threatens to disappear from Jack's life again if he presses charges against David. Greenlee demands that Jack not tell anyone, especially Ryan, that she is alive. On Valentine's Day, David walks down the aisle and is joined by his heavily veiled bride, whose face is obscured. Just as Jack, Erica and Ryan walk in, Greenlee reveals herself as the bride. Greenlee's sudden "return from the dead" sends shock waves through the assembled guests, who soon take their leave with the exception of Ryan (but not before everyone tells Greenlee it is a dumb idea to marry David). Ryan's speechless over Greenlee's intention to marry David, let alone on Valentine's Day of all days. Ryan tells Greenlee he never stopped loving her and is dismayed she kept her survival a secret from him. Greenlee defends David, insisting he is the one who is going to take care of her now. Despite her insistence that Ryan stay away, it is obvious that she still cares for him. Annie crashes the now non-wedding and is stunned to see Greenlee. Ryan lets Greenlee go but remains confident they will get back together one day. Greenlee explains to David why it is so important to her that they get married: It will protect her from falling back in love with Ryan. David and Greenlee's wedding gets underway.

Greenlee becomes increasingly interested in what really happened the night of her accident. She gets on Erica's computer and sees a picture of Kendall on a boat and so she goes to find her. She finds Kendall, who tells her everything that happened, including her affair with Ryan and that she was the one who drove her off the road. Greenlee accuses Kendall of doing it on purpose so that she could have Ryan.

Since Greenlee has been gone, and Kendall left to repair her relationship with husband Zach, Erica has been running Fusion. Now that Greenlee is back, she wants Fusion back too. Erica does not want to hand back the company to Greenlee and "battle" ensues. Greenlee makes a deal under wraps that is later ruined by Erica, who sees the important contract papers on Jackson's desk. Erica takes the papers when Jackson leaves her in his office alone for a minute. Greenlee realizes she needs to pull out the big guns to win back the company she created and loves like a child.

Greenlee and David team up to regain control of Fusion. Greenlee plants documents that frame Erica for stealing money from the Miranda House to pay for her new line of Fusion products. When this scandal becomes public, Erica is out of state, and in order to delay Erica from returning quickly and make a counter-statement to the scandal, David has someone sabotage the plane – expecting the pilot to run routine inspection before take-off. Erica, in a hurry to get back to Pine Valley, insists the pilot take off without the pre-flight inspection or filing a flight plan.

While Erica is missing, Greenlee starts to feel guilty and is looking suspicious. David assures her he is handling the situation and has people out there looking for Erica. Greenlee ends up letting the residents of Pine Valley know that she knew Erica had planned on taking a plane from West Virginia. Ryan immediately has her taken down to the station to be interrogated. David intervenes to prevent Greenlee from incriminating them further. Regardless, everyone in PV blames Greenlee and threatens her. While Jackson, Greenlee's father, is searching the mountain for Erica, he makes a statement that "If Erica is dead, then Greenlee is dead to me." When Erica is finally found and taken to PV Hospital, Greenlee stops by to bring Erica flowers, but Jackson stops her before she reaches Erica and tells her to go away.

Ryan gives Greenlee the space she needs, and soon she begins to act like the old Greenlee. Greenlee sees David standing over Ryan as he is lying on the ground bleeding, and David does nothing to help him. After Ryan wakes up, Greenlee visits him and realizes that if she had not come by when he was hurt, Ryan would have died. So Greenlee asks David for time apart and, to Greenlee's surprise, he is very understanding. David asks Greenlee to have dinner with him before she leaves; during dinner, David blackmails her. He says that he will go to police and say she was the one who sabotaged Erica's plane if she does not agree to stay in their marriage. Greenlee is at first shocked and upset, but eventually "agrees" to David's terms. In reality, Greenlee is planning to play David.

Ryan fakes a relapse in order to get Greenlee to open up to him and tell him what David is doing. Greenlee tells Ryan that David is blackmailing her in order to stay married to him. He manufactured evidence incriminating Greenlee in Erica's plane crash, which he is using to blackmail her. Ryan promises Greenlee that he will help her escape the marriage and put David behind bars. Kendall returns on hearing the news that Ryan is gravely ill, but soon learns of his plan. She agrees to help him and Greenlee.

=== Widowed again and reunited with Ryan ===
On September 7, David fakes his own death at the Yachting Clubhouse. Once learning of this Krystal and David's daughter Marissa Tasker breaks down into tears. Suspects range from Ryan to Frankie Hubbard. Just about all the citizens in Pine Valley had a reasonable motive to want David dead, including Greenlee herself. On September 13, Greenlee finally confesses to Kendall about her involvement in Erica's kidnapping and plans to ruin Erica, once again ending their friendship.

Greenlee and Ryan finally admit their love to one another on November 11. When Greenlee and Ryan return to Pine Valley without evidence, she finds out her sentence. She is sentenced to life in prison for David's death. Just as she is about to be taken away by the court officers, David shows up alive in the courtroom. Once David explains the truth about the night he was supposedly murdered, the charges against Greenlee are dropped, while David is sent to prison in her place.

As she spends Thanksgiving with Ryan and Emma, a struggle occurs on the rooftop. David is shot by Kendall after coming to Ryan's place to kill him and kidnap Greenlee. Erica takes the blame for this as Kendall cannot remember that she shot David.

When Zach dies in a plane crash, Greenlee feels responsible because Zach was trying to help her, and Kendall blames her for exactly the same reason. On December 28, Greenlee gets trapped in the Fusion elevator while Kendall is outside of the elevator. Still blaming Greenlee for Zach's death, Kendall is initially hesitant to help her. While trapped in the elevator, Greenlee and Kendall talk about Zach's death, during which Greenlee breaks down completely, stating that she loves both of them and is tormented by her inability to relieve Kendall's pain, climaxing when she tearfully proclaims that she should have died in Zach's place. With this, Kendall realizes that she does not want to lose Greenlee too, and manages to get help. Though Greenlee continues to insist that she does not deserve Kendall's help and that she should be dead instead of Zach, Kendall immediately denies it, reassuring her that it was never her fault that Zach's plane crashed and that it was wrong of her to blame Greenlee in the first place, the two subsequently embracing and tearfully reaffirming their friendship before going back to Ryan's house, where Kendall tells everyone that it was Zach's influence that led her to save Greenlee.

Greenlee discovers Ryan's ex-girlfriend, Madison North, is pregnant with Ryan's child by breaking into a hospital computer with David's hospital card. She confronts Madison who tells Greenlee she has no idea what she wants to do yet. Greenlee is haunted by this and soon starts to daydream about Ryan and Madison and their baby. While Greenlee is walking, she discovers Madison passed out in the snow. Greenlee gets Madison to the hospital and both Madison and Greenlee learn the baby is okay. Greenlee offers to help Madison start over in New York. Madison happily accepts and thanks Greenlee for saving her and the baby. Soon after, Madison tells Greenlee that she is no longer moving to New York and claiming that Pine Valley is her home. Greenlee worries and tries to set up Dr. Griffin Castillo with Madison. Griffin turns Greenlee down. Greenlee continues to worry about Madison and the baby. After learning that Madison had run into Scott Chandler at prison, Greenlee visits Scott. She makes him an offer; she will give him a job as co-owner of Pine Valley Hospital if he befriends Madison. Greenlee leaves the prison and when she returns, Scott tells her he is going to do this his way. At Scott's request, Greenlee testifies at his parole hearing and Scott is released. Scott starts to befriend Madison, promising his "father" that he will not hurt Madison.

On January 20, 2011 Ryan proposes to Greenlee and she happily accepts. Soon after, Greenlee and Ryan announce their engagement to Erica and Jack, and later Kendall. All of them seem to be very happy for Ryan and Greenlee. After receiving a call from David, Erica convinces Greenlee to confront David and get the divorce papers signed. Later, Greenlee confronts David, who notices she is wearing a ring, one that he had not given to her. After talking with David and revealing that she is now engaged to Ryan, she convinces David to sign the divorce papers.

Greenlee and Ryan set their wedding date as February 14, 2011, and agree to get married at Fusion Cosmetics. On the day of their wedding, Amanda comes over and gives Greenlee gifts from Kendall, such as the first fusion lipstick ever made, and more, Madison North decides to go to work. Madison finds Greenlee's bouquet, and Greenlee catches her with it. Madison rushes off, leaving her phone behind. When Emma, Spike, and Ryan arrive, Madison finds out her phone is gone. She calls it using Scott's phone and Emma picks up. Madison reluctantly comes to get the phone and starts to have cramps while she's there. Ryan tries to help her and asks her what's wrong. She says that it is too soon; when Ryan asks questions what is too soon, Greenlee sees her and blurts out that Madison's pregnant. The information shocks Ryan.

Scott steps in and says Madison's baby is his, which surprises Ryan. Following the pregnancy mess, he and Greenlee exchange teary vows with Emma, Spike and Jackson Montgomery celebrating this joyous moment with them. Later, Annie comes in during the reception and takes Emma for an "adventure". Ryan finds out and tears ConFusion apart. Greenlee tries her best to calm down Ryan, but nothing she does helps. Ryan, JR and Greenlee follow Annie's tracks to Montreal. Later, Jesse approaches them with a security photo of David and Annie together, taken the night of the wedding. While Ryan confronts David, Greenlee approaches Marissa and tells her of her father's involvement. Marissa does not initially believe her, but is convinced when Greenlee gives her some solid points and shows her the photos. Greenlee sympathizes with Marissa's anger and sadness at having fallen for her father's claims that he wanted to change.

=== Leo and Zach's return ===
On August 1, Greenlee asks David for help about her leg numbness. She tells David that she saw someone else besides herself, him and Gale, in the hospital room. He admits that there is someone in the room and that he will help her. However, she has to go with him to a clinic that is in Brazil. On August 2, Ryan tells Greenlee that he wants her to go to Brazil. On August 4, it was revealed that Greenlee lied about her leg numbness. The only reason she went with David was so that she could see Leo. David injects her with something before leaving. When Greenlee wakes up, she sees Leo, laying on the hospital bed. On August 5, when Greenlee and Leo share a kiss, it turns out that Greenlee was dreaming; it is revealed that the person who was next to her was Zach. She is soon brought back from The Orpheus Project that David created.

== See also ==
- Leo du Pres and Greenlee Smythe
