= Marissa Tasker =

- All My Children character
- Sarah Glendening as Marissa Tasker
- Portrayed by: Brittany Allen (2009–2010); Sarah Glendening (2010–2011)
- Duration: 2009–2011
- First appearance: April 21, 2009
- Last appearance: September 23, 2011
- Created by: Charles Pratt, Jr.
- Introduced by: Julie Hanan Carruthers
- Brittany Allen as Marissa Tasker
In-universe information
- Other names: Marissa Chandler
- Occupation: Legal assistant to Caleb Cooney; Law Student at Pine Valley University; Waitress at the Pine Valley Yacht Club; Masseuse at an erotic massage parlor
- Parents: David Hayward; Krystal Carey
- Adoptive parents: Roy Tasker; Lydia Tasker
- Sisters: Babe Carey
- Half-brothers: Oliver Castillo
- Half-sisters: Leora Hayward; Jenny Martin
- Husband: JR Chandler (2009–10)
- Adoptive sons: AJ Chandler
- Grandparents: Charles Hayward; Vanessa Bennett
- Uncles: Leo du Pres (half); Trey Kenyon (half); Earl Carey
- Aunts: Gwyneth Bennett Stone (great)
- Nephews: AJ Chandler
- First cousins: Frankie Stone (once removed); Maggie Stone (once removed)

Marissa Tasker is a fictional character on the American daytime soap opera All My Children who appeared in the television series from 2009 to 2011. She was played by Brittany Allen and Sarah Glendening. When the series concluded on ABC in 2011, Marissa was dating Bianca Montgomery, the lesbian soap opera character played by Eden Riegel. However, in the 2013 online revival of the show, Marissa was revealed to have been shot and killed off-screen by her jealous ex-husband.

== Casting ==
The character of Marissa Tasker was portrayed by Brittany Allen from 2009. Allen's final airdate on All My Children was December 17, 2010. She left the show around the same time as Adam Mayfield, who played Scott Chandler. The reason given for their departure was "a directional shift of the characters".

From December 20, 2010, Sarah Glendening appeared as the "new" Marissa Tasker. Glendening had previously appeared as Lucy on As the World Turns.

== Character history ==
=== 2009–2010 ===
Marissa is the biological daughter of David Hayward and Krystal Carey, and was born on April 10, 1983, along with her late twin sister Arabella "Babe" Carey. Krystal finds Marissa working at an illegal massage parlor to pay for her college tuition. After Krystal accidentally gets her fired, the two are arrested and Krystal offers to pay for Marissa's tuition. Marissa follows Krystal back to Pine Valley, Pennsylvania, and moves in with Krystal and her husband David. Adam Chandler begins blackmailing Krystal when he discovers that Marissa is Krystal and David's daughter. After giving birth to Marissa and her twin sister Babe, Krystal sold the child to the Tasker family. Krystal finally reveals the truth to David and Marissa, infuriating them both. Marissa starts to form a relationship with David, but has a harder time forgiving her mother for her abandonment.

Marissa begins to become close to JR Chandler, who had been married to her twin sister and fathered AJ Chandler with her before she died. David, a longtime nemesis of JR, becomes concerned about the relationship. Marissa begins assisting lawyer Liza Colby, who is representing Kendall Hart in her trial for murdering Stuart Chandler. When Stuart's wife Marian Chandler breaks down, she attempts to shoot Kendall in court, but accidentally hits Marissa instead. David and Dr. Jake Martin attempt a surgery to save her life, but David freezes remembering the death of his daughter Leora, who died as an infant. Nevertheless, with Jake's help Marissa makes it through the surgery and is pleased to see that JR's feelings for her have grown. David offers to stay away from JR's son Little Adam if JR agrees to stay away from Marissa. JR rejects the deal, and tells Marissa he is falling in love with her. It is eventually discovered that Stuart was in fact killed by a drugged Adam Chandler.

When JR learns that he has a rare form of lymphoma, he decides not to tell Marissa, and instead confides in his former step-father Tad Martin. Later, JR confesses he has cancer to Marissa, who offers support and admits she is falling in love with him. JR asks Marissa to marry him on October 21, 2009. Marissa worries it is about the cancer and not about loving each other, JR tells her that he loves her and asks her again. She says yes and later that day Tad marries them. She legally adopts her nephew Little Adam, now called AJ, on March 3, 2010. Marissa has to deal with JR's affair with Annie Chandler (her ex-stepmother-in-law).

On August 11, 2010, Marissa tells Scott that she saw J.R. and Annie at the cottage together. She and Scott then have sex. On August 24, JR and Marissa agree to end their marriage. JR and Marissa agree to divorce on August 30. On August 31, they tell AJ about their divorce, and agreed on joint custody of him.

On November 29, 2010, David attacks Ryan Lavery with the intent to kill him and kidnap Greenlee, whom he had recently married, only to be shot and rendered comatose by Kendall (though the public believes it was in fact Erica). When he awakens on January 17, 2011, Marissa offers to be his defense attorney and hopefully get him to turn over a new leaf, but assures her father that if he doesn't do exactly as she says, she will see to it personally that he is thrown in prison.

When David is incarcerated after apparently attempting an escape, Marissa is outraged, but David manages to convince her that he was set up by Ryan. Eventually, Erica manages to convince the governor to grant David a pardon for his crimes after he helps Griffin Castillo perform emergency heart surgery on Kendall. Marissa immediately sets about trying to rebuild David's reputation.

=== 2010–2011 ===
Meanwhile, Marissa becomes suspicious of Annie and discovers that she is still in love with JR, though she dismisses Annie's claims about her relationship with JR as paranoid delusions. Annie begins to fall apart mentally, eventually following Marissa to the Chandler Mansion and accidentally knocking her unconscious. Panicking, Annie locks Marissa in the attic and accidentally sets off a gas leak. Fortunately, JR comes home and saves Marissa before she suffocates, and Marissa discovers that JR and Annie were indeed in a relationship. JR eventually begins to try to convince Marissa to move back into the mansion, at least for AJ's sake, but Marissa adamantly refuses, insisting that she has too many bad memories of the place.

During Greenlee and Ryan's wedding, Annie arrives during the reception and kidnaps her and Ryan's daughter, Emma. When Jesse Hubbard discovers evidence that indicates that David helped Annie, Greenlee turns to Marissa for help. Marissa refuses to believe Greenlee until she shows her the evidence and gives some solid points. Infuriated and hurt, Marissa gives up on David completely, but nonetheless makes him tell Ryan where Annie has escaped to.

When Bianca Montgomery decides to divorce her wife Reese, she hires Marissa to be her divorce lawyer. Marissa warns Bianca that Reese may end up fighting her for custody of Bianca's daughters and things may get ugly, but Bianca thinks that Marissa is letting her own experience with JR get in the way and dismisses her concerns. However, when Reese's lawyer and nanny arrive from Paris to take Miranda and Gabrielle for a visit, Marissa quickly goes to Erica and Jack for help and gets them to back off. Bianca thanks Marissa and apologizes for doubting her.

Marissa is among those who attend the wedding of Tad and Cara, and stays with AJ at the Chandler mansion at his request. On March 16, 2011, Marissa joins Bianca and Kendall for a day out, and the three are present at ConFusion when a drunken Liza Colby, whose image has been tarnished by an Internet video posted by her daughter Colby revealing Liza's affair with Colby's boyfriend Damon Miller, makes a spectacle of herself in public. Kendall and Bianca express disgust towards Liza and pity for Colby, but Marissa says she just made a mistake. However, Marissa assures Bianca and Kendall that she is not defending Liza, but has known both Liza and Colby for a long time and knows that Liza loves her daughter more than anything.

After being repeatedly asked by JR to move back into the mansion, Marissa begins to fear that she is being unreasonable or unfair to AJ, but Kendall and Bianca assure her otherwise. On May 26, Marissa and Bianca are kidnapped by Rev. Ricky Torres, who ties them up and locks them in a closet. Bianca reveals to Marissa that Ricky is actually a criminal who is directly responsible for the death of Kendall's husband, Zach Slater. Panicked, Bianca reveals to Marissa that she was raped by a man named Michael Cambias, which brought about Miranda's birth, and that she dealt with that trauma by confronting Michael and shooting him to death in self-defense. Marissa comforts Bianca and helps her to calm down, and the two break free of their restraints and escape. Bianca checks herself into the hospital while Marissa makes her way to the Chandler mansion, where she is comforted by JR.

On July 14, 2011, Marissa confessed she is in love with Bianca, when she admitted to the family her feelings about Bianca, everyone was supportive, except for JR who a bad reaction, accusing Bianca of manipulating Marissa and fell off the wagon. Marissa put out a restraining order against JR when she discovered that AJ witnessed JR drinking. On August 16, Marissa and Bianca make love for the first time, unbeknownst to them JR secretly taped their sexual encounter and planned to use it to get full custody. On August 22, Marissa meets AJ's grandmother Dixie Cooney, when she comes to inform Tad that JR had attempted to bribe the presiding judge in their custody hearing with the videotape.

On August 29, Marissa and Bianca discuss finding a house and moving in together with their kids. JR handed the video over to Marissa after her and Bianca confronted him over it, but he continued to threaten them and he repeatedly violated the restraining order in one case at a party at Zach and Kendall's home and tried to kidnap AJ. Luckily, the others foiled JR's attempt and they were relieved when they heard that JR had made plans to leave town for a while.

On September 23, Marissa and Bianca received a text message that they believed was from Scott who invited them to a party at the Chandler mansion to celebrate the resurrection of Stuart Chandler who had been presumed dead for two years until he was revealed to be alive as a part of Project Orpheus. They attended the party and enjoyed celebrating life in Pine Valley when JR, in a drunken rage, shot into the crowd.

=== 2013 ===
On the May 2, 2013 episode of the Prospect Park revival of All My Children, it was revealed that Marissa had died and that she was the one who JR shot in the ABC series finale. David had tried to stop JR from pulling the trigger, but was unsuccessful. David threw JR to the floor and shot him, leaving JR in a coma. David was arrested and jailed for the incident, but returned five years later after being paroled.

Bianca Montgomery, Marissa's partner at the time of her death, is seen visiting her grave and updating Marissa on her nephew/adopted son, AJ and Bianca's own daughter, Miranda, whom they had planned to raise together. Bianca tells Marissa that they were supposed to be together and that she will never stop missing her.
