= Simone Torres (All My Children) =

- All My Children character
- Portrayed by: Terri Ivens
- Duration: 2001–07
- First appearance: October 10, 2001
- Last appearance: November 1, 2007
- Created by: Richard Culliton
- Introduced by: Jean Dadario Burke
In-universe information
- Occupation: Co-owner of Fusion Cosmetics
- Parents: Ezekiel "Zeke" McMillan; Anjelica Torres McMillian
- Siblings: Anthony McMillian

Simone Torres is a fictional character from the long-running American soap opera All My Children. The character was originated by actress Terri Ivens, from October 2001 to December 2006, and guest starred on June 8, 2007, June 20, 2007, and November 1, 2007 as a ghost.

== Storylines ==
Simone Torres in Pine Valley in 2001 at the behest of Edmund Grey in order to aid his brother-in-law Mateo Santos uncover the identity of the drug lord "Proteus". An investigative reporter, Simone works to find Proteus's true identity while pretending to be engaged in an affair with Mateo, in order to protect the latter's wife and son from Proteus's wrath. Simone falls in love with Mateo, but it is clear his heart lies with his wife Hayley. Simone mistakenly believes that a legitimate book publisher is interested in her authoring a book on the investigation. Revealing inside information to the publisher, Simone is shocked when it turns out to be a front set up by Vanessa Cortlandt, the real Proteus. As a result of Simone's leak, FBI agent Chris Stamp is almost killed. A furious Mateo distances himself from Simone.

Simone moves into the same building as Greenlee Smythe, and Greenlee and Simone become friends. Greenlee is preparing for her wedding to Leo du Pres and asks Simone to be her maid of honor. Simone is keeping a secret from her friend; she is having an affair with Greenlee's father Roger, who is still married to her mother, Mary. While continuing to hide her affair, Simone takes on a job as Greenlee's copy writer/assistant at a cosmetics firm. Guilty over betraying Greenlee, Simone eventually ends her affair with Roger, though her feelings are still there.

Roger is shot on Greenlee and Leo's wedding day and while still alive, accidentally tells Greenlee about his relationship with Simone. A furious Greenlee ends their friendship immediately. Roger dies shortly after, and Simone spends months trying to gain Greenlee's forgiveness, which she eventually does.

Devastated at the turn of events, Simone is hospitalized after mixing too much alcohol with pills. She is treated at Pine Valley Hospital by Frank Hubbard. An attraction develops and the two begin a relationship. It is revealed that Simone's brother, Anthony, is in a coma after a drug overdose years earlier. Simone tells Frank the story and he becomes troubled and distant from her. Simone's estranged father Zeke shows Simone a videotape of her brother's overdose and Frank confesses that he actually shot that tape back when he was an overzealous film student. Furious that Frank didn't try to save her brother, Simone breaks up with Frank, and he eventually leaves town.

Miserable about another relationship gone wrong, Simone overhears Kendall Hart and Greenlee putting plans together for a new cosmetics company. At Kendall's insistence, a reluctant Greenlee agrees that Simone be in charge of publicity for the startup company, Fusion Cosmetics.

While working together at Fusion, Greenlee and Simone slowly rebuild their friendship. Simone proves to be an effective publicist as well. Though her stunts often land her in jail, Fusion becomes a known cosmetic company. Simone becomes smitten with Fusion's handyman, Carlos Reyes, despite Carlos' obvious feelings for Greenlee. Simone eventually moves past her feelings and the two become friends.

Simone begins a "strictly casual" sexual relationship with Tad Martin. Despite her best attempts not to, she falls in love with Tad. Tad sensitively lets Simone know that he does not feel the same way, but Simone continues to see him. Seeing Liza Colby and Krystal Carey's interest in Tad only prompts her to fight harder. Eventually, Tad tells all three women he is taking a break from romance in an effort to provide an example for his son Jamie Martin.

Simone throws herself into her work, helping to oversee the launch of Fusion's new fragrance, Enchantment. A year later, she is an integral figure in the launch of Fusion's new product line, aptly titled Fusion. After Kendall Hart breaks up with Ethan Cambias, Simone begins casually dating him. Over time, the two grow more serious and their feelings blossom into true love. The two soon become engaged to each other, but a tragic explosion caused by Janet Dillon at a charity fundraiser kills Ethan. Simone is devastated, but is comforted by her best friends at Fusion.

On December 4, 2006, while the other Fusion girls are downstairs having a celebration party, Simone is upstairs working. Babe Carey Chandler comes into Fusion and finds Simone unconscious and rushes to get help. Sadly, it is too late, Simone is dead. The police are convinced it is a suicide, but Zach Slater thinks she was murdered. Tad is particularly devastated by Simone's passing.

Simone is the first victim of the "Satin Slayer", a serial killer targeting the women of Fusion. Her death brings the other girls of Fusion closer together, even Babe and Kendall, who were previously enemies. A week later, Erin Lavery also dies under the same mysterious circumstances. When Greenlee returned to town, Simone temporarily came back as a ghost (unseen) but felt by her loved ones.

== Reception ==
Jamey Giddens from Daytime Confidential called the character a "wacky temptress" and noted that Ivens had been a "fan favorite with television audiences" since she began portraying Simone.
