= Dixie Cooney =

- All My Children character
- Cady McClain as Dixie Cooney
- Portrayed by: Kari Gibson (1988); Cady McClain (1988–2013)
- Duration: 1988–1996; 1998–2002; 2005–2008; 2010–2011; 2013
- First appearance: July 1988
- Last appearance: September 2, 2013
- Created by: Lorraine Broderick
- Introduced by: Stephen Schenkel; Jean Dadario Burke (1998); Julie Hanan Carruthers (2005); Ginger Smith (2013)
- Crossover appearances: One Life to Live
In-universe information
- Other names: Dixie Chandler; Dixie Martin; Dixie Lawson; Dixie Bodine
- Occupation: Head of the Miranda Montgomery Center for Women and Children; Therapist
- Family: Cortlandt/Cooney
- Parents: Seabone Hunkle; Bess Cooney
- Brothers: Will Cortlandt
- Sisters: Lanie Cortlandt Rampal
- Half-brothers: Del Henry
- Half-sisters: Di Henry
- Husband: Adam Chandler (1989); Tad Martin (1989–1990, 1994–1996, 1999–2002, 2013–); Craig Lawson (1991–1992); Brian Bodine (1992–1993)
- Children: JR Chandler; Kathy Martin
- Stepchildren: Damon Miller; Jamie Martin; Jenny Martin
- Grandchildren: AJ Chandler
- Uncles: Palmer Cortlandt
- First cousins: Ross Chandler; Nina Cortlandt; Andrew Cortlandt (adoptive); Peter Cortlandt; Caleb Cortlandt
- Other relatives: Julie Rand Chandler (adoptive); Bobby Warner (adoptive); Mickey Warner; Asher Pike; Sam Grey (adoptive)

Dixie Cooney is a fictional character from All My Children, an American soap opera on the ABC network. The character was initially portrayed by actress Kari Gibson from her debut in July 1988 until October of that year when she was replaced by actress Cady McClain who portrayed the role from November 13, 1988 until the rest of the character's existence.

The character's initial run lasted from July 1988 to May 2, 1996; she appeared again from July 3, 1998 to February 26, 2002, and from December 23, 2005 to January 31, 2007, when the character was killed. The decision to kill the character in 2007 attracted much criticism and controversy, with TV Guide being dismayed by the choice and calling her the heart and soul of the show.

McClain returned to the series May 2, 2008, playing the character as a ghost. The return lasted through June 12, 2008. McClain again returned briefly to All My Children from March 4, 2010 through April 20, 2010. On April 25, 2011, it was announced that McClain would reprise her role of Dixie full-time on a contract basis as a series regular beginning in the spring of 2011. Her first airdate was May 17, 2011 and she played the role until the final televised episode on September 23, 2011. On February 7, 2013, McClain announced on her website that she would be reprising her role as Dixie on Prospect Park's online continuation of the show.

== Storylines ==
=== 1988–96 ===
Dixie Cooney came to Pine Valley in a truck with her brother, Will Cooney, in search of their Uncle Pete Cooney who had made a name for himself after leaving Pigeon Hollow, West Virginia, years earlier. They were unaware that this man was Palmer Cortlandt, one of the Valley’s richest men. Dixie and Will found work at Cortlandt manor as a maid and stable-hand. They did not realize the identity of their new employer until both saw a face they had not seen in years, their sister: Della Cooney. Palmer welcomed them all into this house.

Dixie was the niece of industrialist Palmer Cortlandt (James Mitchell). She was first married to villainous billionaire and Cortlandt's arch-enemy Adam Chandler (David Canary) in 1989 after giving birth to their son, Adam Chandler Jr., but the marriage was not happy and they divorced in late 1989. Dixie then married Tad Martin in December 1989, but after repeated misunderstandings brought on by Palmer, as well as Tad's biological mother Opal Gardner (at the time Palmer and Opal were dating, they later married and divorced), Tad and Dixie separated. At first they realized their break up was a mistake, but Tad had a one-night stand with Brooke English and Dixie found out. Hurt, Dixie divorced Tad. But even the divorce did not keep them apart, and they reconciled. Tad proposed again and they planned to remarry. On the day of the wedding, Tad was lured into the woods by Billy Clyde Tuggle, and Tuggle tried to kill him, but both characters fell from the bridge fighting and into the raging river. Both were presumed dead, although Tuggle was the only body to be pulled from the river.

Soon after, Brooke learned as a result of her liaison with Tad, that she was pregnant. Early in 1991, she gave birth to her son, Jamie Martin. Dixie remarried in 1991 to Craig Lawson, a Pine Valley businessman, but this union quickly collapsed. By the spring of 1992, they had divorced. Later in 1992, Dixie married the much younger Brian Bodine, but this was not a happy union either. Later that same year, Brian was arrested for murdering Dixie's brother, Will, and this led to the couple's divorce in 1993.

Dixie got the shock of her life when she learned Tad was still alive and had been living in California as Ted Orsini. He had suffered amnesia. Tad regained his memory, but as usual he and Dixie crossed wires and ruined their chances at a happy reunion. He soon married Brooke English, his former lover and mother of his son Jamie. But they were not an ideal couple and soon separated. Tad had an affair with Dixie again and in 1994, he divorced Brooke and remarried Dixie. Tad and Dixie were quite happy at first, but Tad had an affair with his old girlfriend, Liza Colby, and Adam Jr., now 8 years old, saw Tad kissing Liza. He told Dixie and she packed her things, took Adam Jr. and left Pine Valley, but not before getting a quick divorce from Tad.

=== 1998–2002 ===
In 1998, Dixie returned to Pine Valley so that Adam Jr. could see his father more often. She and Tad soon reunited and married for a third time in August 1999. This marriage was much happier than the first two. Tad's son, Jamie, came to live with them and developed a close brotherly relationship with Adam Jr., now called Junior, which as of 2007, still lasts. Unfortunately, Dixie's health started to decline and she suffered kidney failure and miscarried her and Tad's daughter in 2000. The miscarriage devastated Dixie, and Tad was little comfort; he had not cared for the baby, knowing the risks to Dixie's health.

Late in 2001, Tad and Dixie separated again. In January, Dixie had a one-night stand with Dr. David Hayward, and then fled to Jamaica. There she got a "quickie" overnight divorce from Tad. But Dixie regretted this and went back to Pine Valley to beg forgiveness. Tad forgave her and they had a night of passionate sex. Afterwards, Tad and Dixie made plans to marry again, but Dixie learned she was pregnant. Knowing Tad would not want her to have a baby due to the risk it would be to Dixie's health, she fled Pine Valley on February 28, 2002 and went to a special clinic in Switzerland for the birth. In May, she finally wrote to Tad informing him of her pregnancy and Tad made plans to fetch her home. But then tragedy struck. On May 10, 2002, while driving to the airport in the rain, Dixie lost control of her car and went over a cliff. The car wreckage was found the next day, but no trace of Dixie's body was found. After a long search Dixie and her unborn baby were declared dead. Tad and Adam Jr. were devastated. On May 22, 2002, all of Pine Valley held a memorial service in honor of Dixie.

=== 2005–08 ===
In 2005, Dixie's half-sister, Di Henry (Kelli Giddish), came to Pine Valley. No one there knew her so she convinced everyone she was really Dixie. She told an amazing story about surviving the car crash and that she had been living in secret in Switzerland for the past four years. Her plan worked at first, but she began to fall in love with Tad and became attached to Adam Jr., now called JR. She and JR. bonded and became close. But, in October, Di's lies were found out and everyone turned against her. On Christmas Eve 2005, it was revealed that Dixie herself was still alive and that Di knew this all along.

In February 2006, Dixie returned to Pine Valley and hid from Tad while there was an explosion at Erica Kane's ball. She then went to Wildwind, where Di, was staying. Dixie confronted Di about stealing her life, which she did. It was revealed that Dixie's daughter, Kate, survived the accident as well, but that Dr. Greg Madden (Ian Buchanan) was responsible for coercing Dixie into giving her up for adoption. She and Tad finally met face-to-face on April 14, 2006. Dixie and JR met face-to-face a week later. At first, everyone was bitter, and Tad turned completely against her when he learned about her giving away their baby. Dixie became close friends with Zach Slater and Zach pledged to help her find Kate.

On July 4, Dr. Madden was found murdered in Pine Valley Park and in August Zach and Dixie were arrested and charged with the crime. While several people in Pine Valley had a reason to hate and kill Madden, Zach and Dixie were the main suspects. To make things even worse, Tad was the court's key witness against Dixie and Zach. Dixie and Zach falsely claimed to have an "affair" as their alibi. Kendall Hart Slater really found Dixie in bed with her husband, exacerbating the already wide rift between them. On October 5, Zach and Dixie were acquitted and Zach reconciled with Kendall. Tad and Dixie soon got close again.

On January 29, 2007, Dixie collapsed after eating peanut butter pancakes laced with a drug known to bring on V-Tach. She appeared to have died with Tad at her side (January 30, 2007 episode of All My Children). This makes Dixie the third victim of the Satin Slayer to die, but fourth total. It was later revealed in April 2009 by Alexander that he did not make the attempt on Dixie's life, but that the pancakes were intended for Babe.

On January 31, before moving on to the afterlife, Dixie saw Tad in the park with Kathy Mershon (a child who had recently been given to the custody of Julia Santos), and immediately recognized the girl as her long-lost daughter Kate. Delighted at the sight of Tad playing with her daughter—who was clearly safe and completely healthy—Dixie was able to leave her earthly life behind her, content and satisfied.

It was reported that Dixie would return to the series for a short stint to help Tad reunite with their daughter, Kate. McClain returned to the role on May 2, 2008. She again departed on June 12, 2008. It had also been revealed that Dixie might not have died from the Satin Slayer; Tad and JR searched for the person who actually committed the crime. Their search was pushed aside when other story lines came about, at the time of the investigation it was hypothesized that Adam Chandler was trying to kill Babe with the poisoned pancakes.

=== 2010–11 ===
In March 2010, McClain again returned to the role as Dixie on March 4, 2010. Her short-stint ended on April 20, 2010. In April 2010, Dixie's beloved Uncle Palmer died. She welcomed him into Heaven.

On May 17, 2011, despite her previous appearances as a spirit, Dixie is revealed to be alive again, this time in an undisclosed location. In July, it is revealed that David Hayward has been keeping Dixie and allowing her loved ones to believe that she is dead. Dixie is being kept at the same location as Erica Kane, who is being held captive by an insane fan. Dixie soon escapes and heads to Pine Valley where she is seen by her daughter Kathy and Brot. A blind Angie encounters Dixie and feels an immediate connection to her. On July 22, 2011, a drunken JR comes across Dixie in the park. Brot takes Dixie to be evaluated at Oak Haven but she escapes with the help of fellow residents Marian Chandler, Janet Dillon, and Annie Lavery. There she sees Erica Kane, who is of course, very surprised to see her. She then goes to Erica's daughter Kendall Hart Slater's house with Janet and Marian. After she hears David Hayward's name, she runs out. She eventually ends up in the park where she comes upon Tad, thus reuniting the couple for the first time in four years. On August 10, 2011, Dixie meets Tad's wife, Cara Castillo. On August 11, 2011, David finds her in the park and tries to get her. Dixie is shocked to learn that JR is drinking again, which he attributes to her absence. She briefly meets her ex-daughter-in-law, Marissa Tasker (JR's ex-wife) and her seven-year-old grandson, AJ, individually. On August 23, 2011, Dixie sees Amanda Dillon and Angie Hubbard at Tad's house. Dixie and Tad become engaged on September 21, 2011.

== See also ==
- Tad Martin and Dixie Cooney
- Supercouple
