= Judy Blye Wilson =

American casting director

Judy Blye Wilson (born in Houston, Texas) is an American retired casting director known for her work on soap operas. Starting as a script supervisor in 1978, she moved into casting on soap operas in 1981, retiring in 2016 as the casting director for The Young and the Restless.

== Life and career ==
Between 1981 and 1987 she was casting director of Ryan's Hope. In 1988, she started work on One Life to Live until she was hired by Minei Behr in 1991 to work on All My Children till the soap's end in 2011. Later that year she became the casting director of The Young and the Restless.

In 2005 she was the casting director of the short film Exit in which she cast actors from her previous soaps, Kassie DePaiva, who plays Blair on One Life to Live, and Jack Scalia, who played Christopher Stamp on All My Children.

Wilson has won three consecutive Daytime Emmy Awards for "Outstanding Achievement in Casting for a Drama Series" for her work with All My Children. She has been responsible for casting some of the most popular names in that show's history, including Sarah Michelle Gellar as Kendall Hart in 1993. Wilson has won 6 Arios Awards from the Casting Society of America.

Blye Wilson was married to actor Trey Wilson from 1975 until his death in 1989. Her brother is Richard Blye. Her sister was the actress Maggie Blye who died of cancer at 73 in March 2016 in her West Hollywood home. On July 1, 2016, it was announced that Judy had left her post as Casting Director of The Young and the Restless.

== Casting director credits ==
- All My Children (1991–2011)
- One Life to Live (1988–1991)
- Ryan's Hope (1981–1987)
- The Young and the Restless (2011—2016)
- Exit
- Another Night

== Awards and nominations ==
Daytime Emmy Award

- Win, 2013, Casting, The Young and the Restless
- Nominated, 2006, Casting, All My Children
- Win, 2002–2004, Casting,All My Children

Casting Society of America

- Nominated, 1994–2007, Casting, All My Children
- Win, 1995, 1998–2000, 2003–2006, Casting, All My Children
- Win, 2011, Casting, The Young and the Restless
