= Kendall Hart =

Fictional character from American soap opera "All My Children"

- All My Children character
- Alicia Minshew as Kendall Hart
- Portrayed by: Sarah Michelle Gellar (1993–1995); Alicia Minshew (2002–2013)
- Duration: 1993–1995; 2002–2011; 2013
- First appearance: March 11, 1993
- Last appearance: July 8, 2013
- Created by: Megan McTavish
- Introduced by: Felicia Minei Behr (1993); Jean Dadario Burke (2002); Ginger Smith (2013)
- Crossover appearances: One Life to Live
In-universe information
- Other names: K. Fields; Kendall Lang; Kendall Slater
- Occupation: Author; Businesswoman
- Family: Kane
- Parents: Richard Fields; Erica Kane
- Adoptive parents: William Hart; Alice Hart
- Half-brothers: Trey Kenyon; Josh Madden
- Half-sisters: Bianca Montgomery
- Husband: Anton Lang (1994–1995); Zach Slater (2005–2012)
- Sons: Spike Lavery; Ian Slater
- Grandparents: Eric Kane; Mona Kane Tyler
- Aunts and uncles: Mark Dalton; Silver Kane
- Nieces: Miranda Montgomery; Gabrielle Montgomery
- First cousins: Julie Rand Chandler

Kendall Hart is a fictional character from All My Children, an American soap opera on the ABC network. The character was portrayed by Sarah Michelle Gellar from March 11, 1993, to July 3, 1995, and by Alicia Minshew from January 2002 until the show's series finale on September 23, 2011. On March 7, 2013, it was announced that Minshew would guest star on the Prospect Park's continuation of All My Children. She appeared on the second July 8 episode.

Kendall is the daughter of Erica Kane, a child conceived when Erica was raped on the night of her 14th birthday by movie matinee idol Richard Fields. Emerging as one of daytime television's most popular and layered characters, Kendall was originally written as a complex villain, described as a "complicated bad girl" and "the scheming daughter of the biggest schemer of them all, Erica Kane," but was later reformed. The writers scripted her as a heroine, while keeping devious aspects of the character intact.

== Background ==
=== Rapid aging ===
Kendall has been the subject of Soap Opera Rapid Aging Syndrome (SORAS), which caused the show's producers to "de-SORAS" her mother, Erica Kane, portrayed by Susan Lucci. Lucci says that Erica was 15 when the show began in 1970. "I love playing her. I enjoyed playing her when she was a 15-year-old high school girl, the naughty girl in town, and I enjoy playing her now, when she's still the naughty girl, but she's broadened her area of operation to include the entire world," said Lucci. Erica being 15 in 1970 placed her birth year at 1955.

When Kendall first appears on the show in 1993, she is 16 years old, portrayed by a then 16-year-old (or 15-year-old) Sarah Michelle Gellar. This was despite the fact that Kendall was conceived when Erica was raped at the age of 14 before the show began in 1970 (23 years earlier). Fans protested the age differences due to the changes making Erica and Kendall too young compared to Erica's original 1955 birth year. In response to this, the show's producers rapidly aged Kendall to 23, which moved Erica's birth year one year forward to 1956.

When Minshew took over the role in 2002, the character's birth year was changed to 1976; Erica's birth year was subsequently pushed even later than where it was before, to 1962. Though Kendall's birthdate was changed to September 25, 1970, in 1993 as a result of SORAS, her birthdate was revised to September 25, 1976, in 2002, closer to her intended birthdate when she first appeared as a 16-year-old girl.

=== Casting and character portrayal ===
==== Sarah Michelle Gellar ====
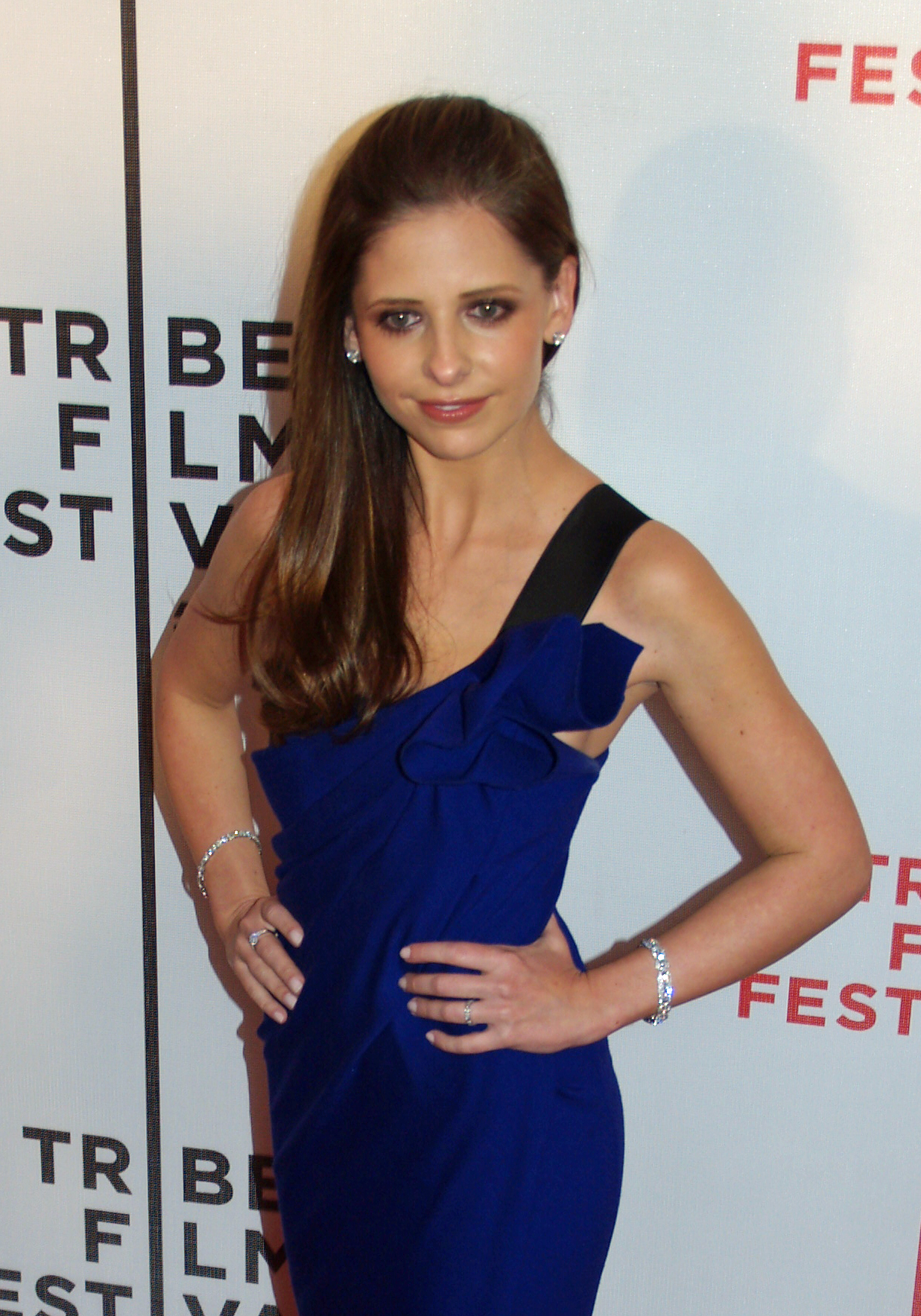
Sarah Michelle Gellar won a Daytime Emmy Award in 1995 for portraying Kendall Hart, Erica Kane's long-lost daughter, from 1993 to 1995.

For at least two years, the producers of All My Children had been thinking about introducing a new character to complicate Erica's storylines. A casting call went out for a young actress to portray the part of Kendall Hart, Erica's long-lost daughter. Many teenage actors in New York auditioned for the role, and the show's producers were adamant about keeping the character's storyline a secret. The actresses were told that Kendall would be Erica's new assistant. "I didn't know when I auditioned for Kendall that she would turn out to be who she is," stated Gellar. "I had heard rumors, but everybody was denying it. Besides, I was scared enough at the thought of working with Susan," she said. Bearing a resemblance to Lucci, Gellar was complimented as having the acting talent and the "forceful personality" needed to go up against Lucci's experience; a "chip off the Kane block", Kendall was to be like a younger version of Erica.

"When they told me I was playing her daughter, I was like, 'What? Daughter? Me?' I remember on my first day when I walked into the rehearsal hall, Susan and Michael were rehearsing a scene," said Gellar. "I was very nervous. I kept thinking, 'What if I'm really bad and they fire me?' I just snuck in the back and tried to blend in with the coffee machine, when all of a sudden, Susan said, 'Hold it, we need to stop for a minute.'" Gellar said that Lucci walked over to her and said, "Congratulations! I'm very glad you're here" and hugged her. "She put her arm around me and said, 'Don't worry, nobody bites.' And then she introduced me to everyone who was there. She really did help me and always made sure I was okay during my first couple of weeks when I was still unsettled. Both Susan and Michael made me feel comfortable," Gellar stated.

Kendall made her All My Children debut on March 11, 1993. She was angry for being "abandoned" at birth – even though going through the pregnancy had resulted from a rape, which Kendall was unaware of – and determined to exact revenge against Erica as payback. Gellar stated that Kendall was "the most terrible daughter" on daytime during her reign while acknowledging Kendall's want for her mother's approval and the multifaceted aspects of the character; she added, "I think that's what's the most fun about her. She's unpredictable, and it allows me to play different aspects of her. She's weak, she's strong, she needs men, she doesn't need men." Regarding the character's years on the show, Gellar said, "I seduced my stepfather, and when he wouldn't sleep with me, I slept with the stable boy, cried rape, and my mother stabbed him with a letter opener. Then I went to jail for perjury, burned my parents' divorce papers, and locked up my little sister. I think that was all in the first week." On portraying Kendall, Gellar stated, "I chose to see Kendall as misunderstood, which was how, as an actress, I justified her actions. It was amazing, though, playing a psycho-looney."

Gellar praised the show for casting her in "a role in (Gellar's) age category which is so complex," and stated, "I thank Judy Wilson (AMC's casting director) so much for giving me the chance to actually be a teenager playing a teenager on the show. (...) To get a role like Kendall, I feel so lucky because it's so rare." When Kendall was aged to 22/23 years old, the audience was bothered by the series having a 17-year-old actress portray that age range. "I may not physically look 23, but then again, not all 23-year-olds look their age," said Gellar. "I think people should just forget about that. Age is a personal vision. Besides, I know that at 17, Sarah is more mature than Kendall at 23."

Gellar's stint on the show was successful. "Longtime fans of the soap saw her as the second coming of Erica." The more Gellar demonstrated that she could handle the work, the more the writers showcased her. She became a household name to the soap opera medium, and "[f]ans wrote to her to tell her she reminded them of Natalie Wood and people stopped her in the street". Gellar won a Daytime Emmy Award in 1995 for the portrayal, but eventually left the role in June 1995 to pursue other acting opportunities, last airing on July 3. Gellar briefly returned to the series as part of the series finale week in September 2011; her cameo was that of a mentally ill patient who claimed to see vampires and that she started seeing them "before they were trendy", and that she was Erica Kane's daughter. Both were nods to Gellar's role as Kendall Hart and her iconic role as Buffy Summers on Buffy the Vampire Slayer.

==== Alicia Minshew ====
The show waited six years before recasting Kendall. Minshew, like Gellar, was unaware that she was auditioning for the role of Erica's first born when the casting call came. "No, I honestly had no clue I was auditioning for the role of Kendall," she stated. "I had auditioned for several roles on All My Children several times and thank God Judy Wilson (All My Children casting director) called me up one day and said 'we are casting a part we think you would be excellent for,'" Minshew stated. "At the time, the role was being called 'Candy' because they were keeping it incognito... Wilson told me she wanted me to come in and just be my fun, sassy self, be strong, be sassy, do what you always do." Minshew screen tested with Josh Duhamel (ex-Leo du Pres), stating:

Love him, love him, love him. Wish I got a chance to work with him! Oh my God. I really think he helped me with my screen test because he was so present for me, so charming and so touchy-feely. He was right there for me. He gave me so much. I remember forgetting my lines and the two of us improvised a little bit, just played off of each other, until I figured out where I was. It was so real! I thanked him. I gave him a big kiss. I said, 'Thank you, you made my screen test so fun. I had such a good time, I forgot that I was trying to get a job.' They had a couple rounds of auditions. [The second time I went in,] we did the exact same scene. He said, 'All right, it's you again! We get to have some fun!' We already had a nice rapport going on, so I was excited. I was like, 'Whatever happens, this is fun.'

It was after the screen test with Duhamel that Minshew was told that the role was actually for Kendall Hart. "Judy pulled me into a room after my screen test and told me, 'I want you to know that the role is for Susan Lucci's daughter Kendall who was originally played by Sarah Michelle Gellar,'" said Minshew. "And then I got so nervous and thought I don't know if I can do this and Wilson said... that I had a pretty good shot at the role, to which I thought ehhhhh she's kissing my butt." Minshew said, "I always tell people that I truly believe one of the reasons why I got this part was Josh... he made me feel so comfortable and I had so much fun playing with him and I was just able to let go, forget I was screen testing and just throw myself into the part... Whatever I did was good and they liked me. I started 3 days after I screen tested."

Minshew detailed her working relationship with Lucci as healthy: "She's just such a strong presence. For a little tiny lady, she's a beautifully strong presence. I've always known who she was. So I was like, 'Wow! That is really cool!' My first day on the show I worked with her. I said, 'Hi, I'm playing Kendall, and I think you're beautiful.' She warmed up to me immediately. We've had a great rapport. She's just... She has only been good to me."

When asked of her portrayal of the character, Minshew cited Kendall's complexity. "She is a hard character to play. When I first came to the show, I was a little off... I had never done daytime before, had never watched the show, so I was not familiar with Sarah Michelle's portrayal of Kendall... I was a newer actress and really, really green and it took me a while to delve into the character and find out who she really was and to make her more real and vulnerable."

As Minshew grew to understand the character, she became more connected to Kendall. Her acting improved with each newly discovered aspect. Years later, Minshew stated, "Now I feel like I love Kendall so much. She has become part of me. I find myself sticking up for her and defending her...the character means a lot to me on a personal level and it's nice to see the fans enjoying Kendall as much as I enjoy playing her."

== Storylines ==
=== 1993–1995 ===
Placed for adoption as a baby, Kendall Hart is raised in Florida by her adoptive parents, Alice and Bill Hart. They keep her adoption a secret from her until she overhears them discussing it late one night. Though raised by loving parents, Kendall feels displaced all her life and when she is old enough she accesses her adoption papers. When she learns that her birth mother is her childhood idol, Erica Kane, she dreams of a mother-daughter reunion and of basking in her idol's approval. She arrives in Pine Valley, Pennsylvania as a teenage runaway and asks for a job at Enchantment, her mother's cosmetics company, but keeps her identity a secret at first. Erica hires Kendall as her personal assistant to help plan her wedding to Count Dimitri Marick. In April 1993 Erica's mother, Mona Kane Tyler, recognizes a familiar birthmark on Kendall's neck, identical to the birthmark she saw on Erica's firstborn when she held her as a baby. Mona suspects Kendall is the daughter Erica bore at 14 after being raped on her 14th birthday by movie actor Richard Fields. Fields had hoped to act in a film that Eric Kane, Erica's father, was producing. Young Erica had suppressed the memories but they return in May 1993 after learning Kendall is her daughter. Meanwhile, Kendall reveals to Myrtle that Erica is her mother, showing her adoption papers listing Erica's name. Jealous of the attention her half-sister Bianca Montgomery receives after a horse-riding accident in May 1993, Kendall blurts out her real identity to Erica. Erica welcomes Kendall into her life as her daughter and invites Kendall to live with her.

Erica, Dimitri, Kendall, and Bianca all work to grow as a family but Kendall's jealousy of Bianca, and of the attention she receives from Erica, persists as she and Bianca continue to bicker and argue. Bianca, feeling jealous by Kendall's developing relationship with Erica, ruins Kendall's bridesmaid dress in an unsuccessful attempt to remove her from Erica's wedding party in June 1993. Kendall manipulates Bianca and when Bianca locks herself in the Wildwind mausoleum, Kendall ignores her sister's cries but admits where Bianca is soon afterward. As Erica and Kendall work to develop a healthy mother-daughter relationship, an unaware Kendall accidentally stumbles upon her birth father's identity in August and begs Erica to tell her who her biological father is. Erica initially attempts to shield Kendall from this but, at Kendall's pleas to tell her, Erica reluctantly reveals this information, stunning Kendall. When Kendall begins asking questions, Erica demands that Kendall completely forget about him. Despite Kendall's promises to do so and repeated warnings from Erica against locating Richard Fields, a distressed Kendall resolves to find her biological father after expressing the need to understand everything about where she came from and tries to keep her search hidden from her mother. Dimitri offers to help Kendall and aids her in her search, hiring Hayley as a private investigator. During the successful operation, Kendall develops a crush on Dimitri. Erica experiences flashbacks to her rape after she comes across Kendall's research on her biological father in the stables in October 1993 and again, she forbids Kendall from finding him.

However, together with Dimitri and Hayley, Kendall finds Richard Fields in November 1993 to confront him over his violation of Erica but Richard Fields lies to Kendall that he never raped her mother. Desperate to believe she was not conceived in rape, Kendall makes herself accept Richard Fields' story. When Erica finds out Kendall has visited her biological father in California and discovers Dimitri's part in it, she lashes out at them both and leaves Dimitri, demanding a divorce. Shortly after, Kendall's adoptive mother calls in December 1993 and asks her to return to them in Florida but Kendall still wants another chance with Erica. Erica implores Kendall to stop hurting herself and return to the Harts after telling her she can no longer try to be the fantasy mother Kendall dreamed her to be. Kendall is distraught by this and finds Dimitri, mistaking his paternal feelings for her as attraction. As Dimitri explains he only loves Kendall as a daughter, Kendall unsuccessfully attempts to seduce her step-father and Dimitri rejects her. Devastated, Kendall goes to her friend, Anton Lang, to talk but she loses her virginity to Anton when they end up having sex. The following morning, Kendall, afraid she is pregnant, hysterically goes to Erica and claims Dimitri raped her. Enraged, Erica accuses Dimitri of raping her daughter and stabs him with a letter opener when she hallucinates him as Richard Fields.

Having learned Kendall is denying her accusation against Dimitri, Erica tries to coax an anxious Kendall into admitting that Dimitri raped her but Kendall eventually reveals she made up the claim. Upset, Kendall reveals she now believes Richard Fields' stories to her that he's not a rapist, despite Erica continuing to warn Kendall against him, and angrily says her lie about Dimitri was revenge against her mother for giving her up at birth. Erica says she was defending Kendall against Dimitri. Appalled, she disowns Kendall. At Erica's attempted murder trial in February 1994, Kendall states that Erica knowingly stabbed Dimitri because she was jealous he wanted Kendall romantically as well. Kendall tells the jury that the only thing she told Erica was that she had unprotected sex with Anton and was afraid she was pregnant. Kendall is continually cautioned against Richard Fields by everyone but remains unable to accept their warnings about him and wanting to believe Richard Fields loves her, brings him to Pine Valley in January 1994. A horrified Kendall catches Richard Fields attempting to rape Bianca in March 1994 and stops him, rescuing Bianca before she is assaulted. Having witnessed Richard Fields for what he truly is and devastated to accept that he raped Erica, Kendall banishes him from her life, apologizes to Erica and testifies for the defense, confessing her lies in court. She is charged with perjury by the DA and sentenced to 30 days at Green Briar, a correctional facility. Erica refuses to help Kendall out of her perjury charge but, feeling terrible over leaving her daughter in jail, she calls Alice Hart to help Kendall and Kendall is briefly reunited with her adoptive mother in March 1994.

While imprisoned, a newly embittered Kendall meets Janet Green (initially unaware of Janet's identity), who has received experimental plastic surgery on her face and the two gradually become friends. After both are released from jail in April 1994, Kendall keeps quiet about Janet's true identity when she learns she is masquerading under a new face and name "Jane Cox", in an effort to help Janet reunite with her young daughter, Amanda. Kendall helps keep Janet's secret, admiring Janet's love for Amanda, wanting Erica to love her in the same way. However, Janet's identity is revealed during her failed wedding to Trevor Dillon. Their friendship continues, lasting until Kendall witnesses what she believes to be Janet's death in May 1995. In love, Anton proposes to Kendall while she is in jail and Kendall accepts. She and Anton move into the Hunting Lodge at Wildwind near the end of April 1994, where she meets Julia Santos, igniting a lasting rivalry. Anton has Kendall promise that she will cease her plotting against Erica.

Dimitri, who has since learned Anton is his son, hires Kendall as his personal assistant on the same condition that she stop her schemes against her mother. However, hurt by her history with Erica, Kendall secretly agrees to write a tell-all book about her mother with Del Henry, a writer who initially proposed this idea to her while she was still incarcerated. When Kendall's grandmother, Mona, dies in August 1994, Kendall is deeply affected and attempts to pay her respects, only to be angrily confronted by Erica, who mistakenly believes that Kendall is faking her grief and had merely come to make a scene. Despite Kendall's heartfelt confessions, Erica orders her to leave. Later, when visiting Mona's grave, Kendall gets into another argument with Dimitri, which climaxes when Kendall demands to know why he still protects Erica after she stabbed him. She manages to intercept a thank-you note from Erica to Dimitri and forges a new letter in its place to thwart any reconciliation between them. Her work with Del on the misleading tell-all book continues and they start to develop a friendship. Del urges Kendall to let go of her revenge schemes, telling her to use her talents for good, and Kendall supports Del as he prepares for his kidney transplant, which he undergoes later in December 1994. However, Kendall's involvement in the book is discovered in August 1994. Though Anton lets Kendall stay at first, he throws her out of Wildwind when he discovers Kendall has been sabotaging her mother's relationship with Dimitri again.

After the tell-all book is dropped, Kendall briefly fakes a pregnancy and fakes a suicide attempt in an effort to win Anton back during September 1994. In December 1994, Janet suggests to Kendall that she lie that Anton is Dimitri's son. Kendall, trying again to win Anton back and get revenge on the Maricks, tells this seeming lie to Anton, completely unaware it is true. After Dimitri confirms this to Anton, Anton finds Kendall and elopes with her as vengeance against their respective parents. Kendall and Anton experience a difficult marriage. She is hired as a waitress and Anton, angry at Dimitri, quits his medical training to become a car mechanic. Corvina convinces Kendall to steal fabled documents kept in a ceramic leopard at Wildwind that would make Corvina and Anton the heirs to Wildwind. When they find it empty, Corvina and Kendall forge these documents themselves. Kendall becomes worried as Anton and Julia grow closer but her relationship with Del grows stronger, conflicting Kendall. Del continuously attempts to persuade a torn Kendall from her revenge plots, assuring her that Erica doesn't hate her and she (Kendall) is good. Later, Del warns the Maricks that Kendall is developing a new scheme. The forgeries Kendall and Corvina created to inherit Wildwind fail and Anton has his marriage to Kendall annulled after she is tricked by the Wildwind residents into signing annulment papers due to her continuing plots.

Kendall's relationship with Del develops into a romance and they fall in love during May 1995. He helps Kendall to rebuild her life, and let go of her anger against Erica and the Harts. She renews her relationship with her adoptive mother, Alice Hart, after her father, Bill, dies suddenly from heart problems in June 1995, leaving Kendall grief-stricken. Together, Kendall and Del prepare to go to Florida so Kendall can take care of Alice after learning Alice is suffering from health problems. Before her departure, Kendall and Anton wish each other well. Kendall makes peace with her mother, Erica, and apologizes to her for all the bad things she had done, explaining that she did these things out of hurt and in order to get Erica's attention but now accepts that she was placed for adoption in an act of love and not selfishness. Erica forgives her and gives her Mona's ring, hugging Kendall before wishing her to be happy. Kendall leaves Pine Valley with Del on July 3, 1995. Erica later expresses sadness over Kendall's departure, noting that despite everything that transpired between them, she still cares for her daughter.

=== 2002–2010 ===
Seven years later in January 2002, Erica goes on trial for the murder of Frankie Stone, Bianca's girlfriend. Needing someone to help incriminate her, Erica calls Kendall, half-wishing that Kendall will not betray her in hopes she really has changed and they can bond. Newly embittered, Kendall implicates Erica. Having since amicably split from Del, Kendall stays at the Pine Cone Motel across from Ryan Lavery. The two come to verbal blows often due to their strong-willed personalities, but eventually begin dating. After Erica's house is set on fire, Kendall is charged with arson due to seemingly circumstantial evidence. Ryan hires Trey Kenyon to represent her at trial, not knowing that Trey is the real arsonist and has framed Kendall for burning her mother's house down (Trey is later imprisoned when he is revealed as the actual arsonist). Believing that Erica is framing her, Kendall becomes obsessed with the idea of exposing her mother, despite being engaged to Ryan. When Aidan Devane catches Kendall searching for evidence she is being framed, she attempts distract him with seduction but is found by Ryan in this position. Ryan ends his relationship with a devastated Kendall and leaves town. Erica learns evidence of Kendall's innocence and uses it to clear her of her arson charge.

Needing something beyond her flirtation with Aidan, Kendall begins a cosmetics company along with Greenlee Smythe, Mia Saunders, and Simone Torres, with start-up capital provided by Liza Colby, to compete with her mother's company, Enchantment. They name the company FUSION. It has a rocky start, as Kendall and Greenlee have been enemies in the past, but their company grows to be a success.

Kendall begins dating the charming Michael Cambias, unaware he is using her to take down her mother's company. She ends things after sensing menace behind his charms. He attempts to rape both Kendall and Erica but while mother and daughter save each other from Michael, he succeeds in raping her younger sister, Bianca. As Bianca's rape occurs elsewhere, Kendall helps Erica through a panic attack involving the night she was raped and Kendall was conceived. This marks a cornerstone in their relationship. Police are unable to make a strong case against Cambias. Kendall begins a convoluted plot against Cambias to help her mother and sister when he is released from prison. Kendall claims she married Michael in Las Vegas but shortly afterward, Michael is murdered by an unknown assailant. Her relationship with Erica, which has grown closer over the previous months, is again strained because of the marriage to Michael and the revelation that Bianca is pregnant with his child. Erica encourages her to get an abortion and Bianca prepares to go through it with the help of her friend, Maggie Stone. At the clinic, Kendall tells her sister how much she admired her, and though Kendall does not give an opinion on the abortion, Bianca lets Kendall know that she has secretly decided to keep her baby.

In an effort to help protect Bianca when her pregnancy is nearly discovered, Kendall claims that she, herself, is pregnant with Michael's child after marrying him. However, prior to Michael's murder, Kendall actually married Enchantment's chemist, Boyd Larraby, who masqueraded under Michael's identity so Kendall could fake a wedding to Michael. A skeptical Greenlee begins investigating her friend while Erica berates her daughter. Bianca, however, stands by her sister, as does a newly returned Ryan, who helps keep the secret. Kendall explains to Bianca that she is helping her and her baby partly because she sees herself in Bianca's baby since Kendall was conceived in rape herself. The sisters become close again.

Kendall is charged with Michael's murder. Jackson, David, Maggie, Ryan, and Lena help Kendall and Bianca with their ruse and, while Erica works to help Kendall as well, Bianca and Kendall keep their mother unaware of the truth. Kendall is put on trial for murder and begins wearing padding underneath her clothes to keep up the ruse. Not understanding the level of trust Ryan has in Kendall and frustrated everyone is protecting Kendall, Greenlee reveals the fake pregnancy by ripping the dress off a testifying Kendall. Kendall is forced to reveal that she had faked her pregnancy to protect Bianca, who has killed Michael, though Bianca doesn't remember. Working to protect her daughters throughout the trial, Erica lashes out at Kendall and Bianca for keeping the truth from her. However, upon learning the reasons behind Kendall's actions, Erica becomes close to her eldest daughter again and their relationship stays strong but Kendall's budding friendship with Greenlee is shattered, earning Greenlee the wrath and disgust of the entire town.

Kendall begins dating Ryan again, who suggests that she forgive Greenlee. Kendall refuses and uses the controlling interest of Fusion she had inherited after Michael's death to treat her former friend unfairly. To even the playing field, Ryan gives Greenlee the shares of Cambias he has inherited from the deceased Alexander Cambias. He proposes to Greenlee to help her out at Fusion but when an infuriated Kendall learns of this, she locks her nemesis in a room to stop the marriage. Kendall attempts to marry Ryan herself, but he chooses Greenlee after realizing what Kendall has done.

To help Kendall be on equal footing at Fusion with Greenlee, Zach Slater offers to marry her and give her his shares of Cambias Industries. Over time, Zach and Kendall's relationship turns into deep romantic love and Kendall's friendship with Greenlee heals. The two become so close that they consider themselves "sisters".

Kendall's first son, Spike Lavery, is born on May 31, 2006. He was originally conceived to be Greenlee's biological child, carried by surrogate mother Kendall. However, a power outage caused by Zach forces Kendall to use her own egg during the artificial insemination. She is almost killed when JR Chandler accidentally drops construction supplies on Kendall and her unborn son. Zach comes to consider Spike as his own son, though Kendall shares custody with Ryan and his wife Annie Lavery at the time. Kendall conceives her second son, Ian, with Zach during their second marriage in February 2007 while the "Satin Slayer" terrorized Pine Valley. Ian is born severely premature but survives.

In early 2009, Kendall is rendered comatose. Her half brother Josh then suffers a fatal gunshot wound. Devastated by the loss of her son and potentially losing her eldest daughter, Erica consents to transplanting Josh's heart inside Kendall to save Kendall's life.

=== 2013 ===
On July 8, 2013, Minshew reprised the role of Kendall Hart. On May 1, 2013, Zach reveals that he and Kendall divorced while the show was off the air because the Russian mob wanted a piece of his casino. Kendall was sick of living in fear and wanted her kids to be safe. Bianca is revealed to be taking care of Kendall as something is wrong with her heart again. Kendall urges Bianca to return home and that she is fine.

== Development and reception ==
=== ConFusion nightclub ===
ABC executives decided to capitalize on Kendall's popularity by having the character ponder the idea of a nightclub, and then extend that to real-life events. The series detailed Kendall naming the club ConFusion. Though the "Fusion girls" are shown to love the idea, Babe Carey Chandler does not, for fear that another nearby bar will tempt her alcoholic husband (JR) and send him on yet another destructive path. Kendall goes through with the idea, however, and the nightclub opens its doors to a red carpet event on July 25, 2006. The event is the introduction of real-life pop star Rihanna as one of the show's musical guests. Following her appearance, real-life singer Mary J. Blige makes a cameo appearance at the club on July 28, 2006. Soon after the appearances, the club becomes one of the popular establishments for residents of the series.

The nightclub also manages to acquire several famous real-life reporters, who portray themselves while the residents of Pine Valley walk down the red carpet. Such reporters included Emily Frances (the main entertainment reporter for the WB11 Morning News), Taylor Race (of WPLJ/New York), and America's Next Top Model contestant Toccara Jones, among others, as one of the reporters in a scene where Rihanna walks through on her way to a performance inside of the club.

Of the nightclub ConFusion event, Taylor Race briefly described his Pine Valley town-experience with humor: "If you think you put a lot of time and effort into a bit or break on the radio, think again when it comes to TV – you spend 20 minutes in makeup, just to get the mic flag on TV!" he said, as he sipped his double half-caf, no-foam, extra hot, nonfat, 30% soy latte delivered by his assistant, Serge. "I picked up some serious TSL today in Pine Valley...and a nasty rash too. I'd love to spend more time chatting with you, but the Daytime Emmy people are on Line 7, and Lucci is requesting The Goo Goo Dolls on Line 9. I will tell you that this daytime drama stuff is great – you just make stuff up! Hold on – I'm going to stare at my cell phone for dramatic effect.... OK, that's a wrap! Lunch, everybody! Back on set at 3 pm!"

A few real-related products were presented by the employees of the club, including wheat grass plant (available at Target or online at Amazon.com), George Nelson Lamps (available at Target or online), Panasonic Flatscreen Television (available at Target or online), and Spiegelau Vino Grande Martini Glasses (available at Amazon.com).

=== Book ===
In February 2008, executives decided to have Kendall write and sell a book that would also be available in real-life stores, coinciding the fictional and real-life launch dates.

The book is credited as being written by the character. Publishers Weekly said Kendall is "given a novelist's voice", and that the writers who produced the tie-in "[got] it right". The book, titled CHARM!, was released at a price of $15.99, and was successful; it became a bestseller not only within the series but in real life, with Publishers Weekly adding:

The novel's conceit is that the book is Kendall Hart's roman à clef, written to set All My Children's town of Pine Valley on its ear. Kendall Hart's stand-in for this fiction (i.e., the fictional author Kendall's fictional avatar in the novel) is a sweet yet assertive young woman, Avery Wilkins, who runs her own New York–based cosmetics company, Flair, and is launching a new perfume—Charm!—that she hopes will put her on the map. When Avery first founded the company with financial backer Finn Adams, a softhearted smart man she later fell in love with, she never thought that he would die and leave his share of the company to his Paris Hilton–type daughter, Parker. Parker's drug and alcohol binging at late-night glitterati parties endanger the reputation of Flair and its new perfume, and a mysterious phone call to Avery from a manipulative woman claiming to be Avery's mother (a nod to Susan Lucci's character, Erica Kane) throws everything into a heady cloud of smoke. Romance aficionados will find Avery's two love affairs (with a dashing newsmagazine producer and a quick-witted yet sensitive billionaire, natch) intoxicating, but the denouement lacks punch—perhaps because soaps never have to come up with an ending.

== See also ==
- Zach Slater and Kendall Hart
