= JR Chandler =

- All My Children character
- Jacob Young as JR Chandler
- Portrayed by: Charlotte and Margaret Baughman (1989–1992); Kevin Alexander (1992–1996); Jesse McCartney (1998–2001); Jonathan Bennett (2001–2002); Andrew Ridings (2002–2003); Jacob Young (2003–2011); Ryan Bittle (2013)
- Duration: 1989–1996; 1998–2011; 2013
- First appearance: July 3, 1989
- Last appearance: September 2, 2013
- Created by: Margaret DePriest
- Introduced by: Felicia Minei Behr (1989); Jean Dadario Burke (1998); Ginger Smith (2013)
- Crossover appearances: One Life to Live
- Ryan Bittle as JR Chandler
In-universe information
- Occupation: 50% Shareholder of Chandler Enterprises; CEO of Chandler Enterprises; Executive of Chandler Enterprises
- Family: Chandler; Cortlandt/Cooney
- Parents: Adam Chandler; Dixie Cooney
- Stepfather: Tad Martin
- Half-brothers: Miguel Reyes
- Half-sisters: Skye Chandler (legal); Hayley Vaughan; Anna Chandler; Colby Chandler; Kathy Martin
- Spouse: Babe Carey (2003, 2004–2005, 2006–2007); Marissa Tasker (2009–2010)
- Children: AJ Chandler
- Grandparents: Seabone Hunkle; Bess Cooney
- Uncles: Stuart Chandler; Will Cortlandt; Del Henry (half); Palmer Cortlandt (great)
- Aunts: Lottie Chandler; Lanie Cortlandt Rampal; Di Henry (half)
- Nephews: Enzo Santos (half)
- Nieces: Lila Rae Alcazar (legal)
- First cousins: Ross Chandler (also once removed); Scott Chandler (adoptive); Nina Cortlandt Warner (once removed); Andrew Cortlandt (once removed; adoptive); Peter Cortlandt (once removed); Caleb Cortlandt (once removed)
- Other relatives: Julie Rand Chandler (adoptive); Bobby Warner (adoptive); Mickey Warner; Asher Pike; Sam Grey (adoptive)

Adam "JR" Chandler Jr. is a fictional character from the ABC and The Online Network daytime drama All My Children. He was portrayed by Jacob Young from 2003 to 2011, prior to Ryan Bittle taking over the role in 2013. Bittle was cast as the new JR on Prospect Park's continuation of All My Children. Following the show's 2011 cancellation and 2013 online revival by Prospect Park, Ryan Bittle assumed the role - a recasting decision that sparked fan debates about character continuity. JR's character arc notably included corporate power struggles, substance abuse plots, and multiple marriages, embodying the Chandler family's legacy of complexity.

== Background ==
The character was introduced on July 3, 1989, as the son of Dixie Cooney and her estranged ex-husband, Adam Chandler. In March 2004, the character's birth year was revised to July 3, 1983. He is a member of both the powerful and wealthy Chandler and Cooney families, being the son of Adam Chandler and great-nephew of Palmer Cortlandt.

The writers characterized JR as caring, but ruthless if betrayed, explaining the latter by way of his difficult upbringing. The character's softer personality has been attributed to his mother, Dixie Cooney, as well as to his son, AJ, and true love Babe Carey (who was killed off by the series in 2008).

Credited as significantly complex, he has been cited as a television anti-hero, and "bad boy," and his struggles with family, romantic partners, and alcohol addiction have been documented in literature.

== Character creation ==
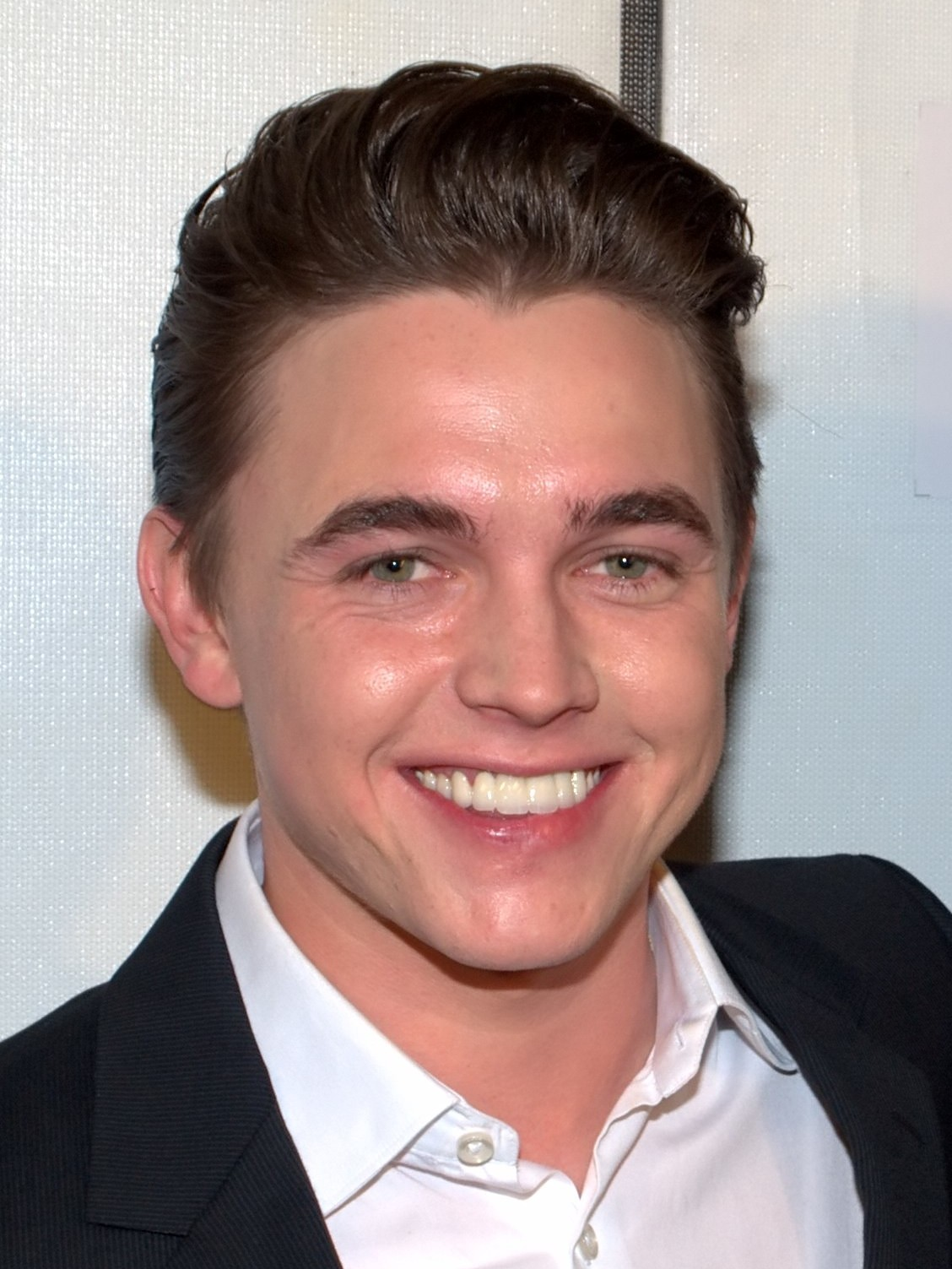
Jesse McCartney portrayed a young JR from 1998 to 2001, when the character was rapidly aged.

Actor Jacob Young, who had been on The Bold and the Beautiful (Rick Forrester) and General Hospital (Lucky Spencer) prior to joining All My Children, debuted as JR on October 2, 2003. Young stated that JR had good instincts, but that he "was young and kind of doe-eyed to the world" then. It was not until the actor stepped into the All My Children role of JR Chandler that his acting range became more focused. He started to use tools he learned in classes and felt that his acting became more refined because of it. With his portrayal of JR, he explained how this factored in: "They twisted JR in a completely different direction," he stated. "They started off with JR not respecting his father and having a lot of elements of his mother in him. He was much softer. Then they started toying with it and couldn't believe what was coming out of me. I'd always been the nice, honorable guy; I'd never been the character who was stirring the pot."

JR's rich lifestyle was something that Young noted not being familiar with, stating that the JR persona did not come to him until he would put on the suit. "They put me in these nice designer suits, and I suddenly feel like a million bucks. Then I take that million-buck feeling and go a little sinister with it."

One aspect of JR's personality is "devious tones" sometimes present in his dialogue. "When the character is in a good mood and has the upper hand, he has all these one-liners," Young relayed. When working with former All My Children co-star Alexa Havins (ex-Babe Carey), Young would often shock Havins with the character's words. To make sure she was unaware of how he was going to deliver a crass line, he would keep it hidden [during rehearsal]. "You can break the wording down and make it a little more offensive," he cited. "And I try to nail that because that's what JR's supposed to do."

The writers were looking for an actor who could truly radiate the essence of Adam Chandler's son and felt that taking JR down the path of darkness would help with that. Young, the actor chosen as best suited for the part, detailed the transition: "They wanted it to be 'like father, like son,' so I watched David Canary's (Adam) mannerisms and delivery. I tried to mold those into my own, enough to where I could be his son. They started writing my dialogue like his. He has some one-liners that are pretty funny. David is as big a goofball as I am onset. He's like, 'Here's my boy!' We have a great dynamic together."

Young's portrayal of JR propelled the character into one of the show's more popular and hated characters.

Have you have seen those piercing blue eyes? When they're not flashing with anger, a glimpse of the troubled young man who was deeply wounded by the presumed death of his mother shows through. Like Babe, we could easily fall into the trap of thinking that a little tender loving care from us would fix him right up.

— Soaps In Depth magazine on JR being a love-to-hate fixture

== Storylines ==
=== 1989–2011 ===
JR is born in 1989 as the son of Adam Chandler and Dixie Cooney. Throughout his life, he has been involved with Amanda Dillon, Kendall Hart, Annie Lavery, and mainly linked to Babe Carey and Marissa Tasker. JR and Babe - who have been married three times to each other - produce a son, AJ Chandler, in 2004 and are involved in a three-way baby switch storyline. Bianca Montgomery's daughter Miranda Montgomery is switched to Babe and JR, while their own child is given to Kelly Cramer (of One Life to Live). Kelly's recent pregnancy ends in stillbirth and given to Bianca. Eventually, the truth is revealed and Miranda goes back to Bianca, while AJ is returned to Babe/JR, and finally, Kelly Cramer deals with the death and the situation. In 2009, Babe dies from injuries of a tornado and JR later gets involved with Babe's twin sister and AJ's aunt Marissa Tasker, who he later married. They divorce in 2010, and in 2011, Marissa starts dating Bianca. That same year, his mother is revealed to be alive, along with his uncle, Stuart Chandler. A devastated JR becomes drunk and arrives with a gun at Brooke and Adam's party, where a shot is heard.

=== 2013 ===
It is revealed that JR has been in a coma for five years. On the night that changed Pine Valley five years ago (the ABC series finale), the drunken JR was about to shoot someone, but David Hayward intervened; JR pulled the trigger and shot someone in the house, while David shot JR and put him in a coma. It is revealed on May 2, 2013, that JR shot and killed Marissa Tasker, his ex-wife (David's daughter).

== See also ==
- JR Chandler and Babe Carey
- List of fictional anti-heroes
