= Babe Carey =

- All My Children character
- Alexa Havins as Babe Carey
- Portrayed by: Alexa Havins (2003–2007, 2011); Amanda Baker (2007–2009)
- Duration: 2003–2009; 2011
- First appearance: October 13, 2003
- Last appearance: September 21, 2011
- Created by: Megan McTavish
- Introduced by: Julie Hanan Carruthers (2003, 2011); Frank Valentini (2003)
- Crossover appearances: One Life to Live
- Amanda Baker as Babe Carey
In-universe information
- Other names: Arabella Carey; Kate Anderson; Babe Cramer; Babe Chandler
- Occupation: Marketing executive and shareholder for Fusion Cosmetics; Co-owner of Fusion Cosmetics; Shareholder for Chandler Enterprises; Waitress/bartender at various clubs and restaurants
- Parents: David Hayward; Krystal Carey
- Sisters: Marissa Tasker
- Half-brothers: Oliver Castillo
- Half-sisters: Leora Hayward; Jenny Martin
- Spouse: Paul Cramer (2003); JR Chandler (2003, 2004–2005, 2006–2007)
- Children: AJ Chandler
- Grandparents: Charles Hayward; Vanessa Bennett
- Uncles: Leo du Pres; Trey Kenyon; Earl Carey
- Aunts: Gwyneth Bennett Stone (great)
- First cousins: Frankie Stone (once removed); Maggie Stone (once removed)

Arabella "Babe" Carey is a fictional character from the American daytime drama All My Children. She was originally portrayed by actress Alexa Havins, from October 13, 2003, to October 8, 2007, and then by actress Amanda Baker from October 8, 2007, to October 31, 2008. Havins crossed over as character sporadically on One Life to Live from November 24, 2003 to February 2005. The character was killed off on the October 23, 2008 episode of the show, after suffering injuries during a series of tornadoes, although she reappeared briefly on June 2 and 29, 2009, as a ghost. In September 2011, Babe (Havins) briefly returned to Pine Valley as an apparition appearing to JR.

Though originally scripted as age 19 in 2003, in a star-crossed romance with character JR Chandler, Babe's birth date was later set by the series as April 10, 1983, upon the character's death. The writers often had the character referred to as "Baby Doll" by her mother, Krystal Carey (Bobbie Eakes), and occasionally as "Bella" when speaking to Kevin Buchanan (Dan Gauthier) on One Life to Live. In addition, the series displayed significant comparisons between her and legendary character Dixie Cooney.

== Casting and character creation ==
=== Alexa Havins ===
In a January 20, 2004 interview with magazine Soap Opera Weekly, Havins briefly described her audition and how she secured the role: "I missed the first round of auditions, and the casting director called my manager and said, 'How come I think this girl's perfect?' And she said, 'Because Alexa can play trash with her eyes closed' (laughs)."

The character was originally designed as a bad girl the audience could hate, but was later presented as a "flawed good girl." Havins preferred the character to be "driven" and said her "all-time favorite Babe moments" are when the character was being spunky. "I love when she's pumped and she's like a cheerleader, seeing the good in everything," she said. Of Babe's darker moments, Havins stated, "My favorite moment of Babe down — just emotionally beat up and dragged through the dirt — would probably be the moment at the river with Krystal," the moment Babe is told her baby has died. "...I loved when Little Adam almost drowned [in the pool]. There was this vulnerable side of her that hadn't come out for a while," she said. "And I loved playing that because that was a range of emotions between loving your child, being scared to death, hating your husband for not being responsible, etc. There was not one set way of thought or feeling in those scenes."

While with the series, Havins was often put in feature stories. When asked in 2006 by Soap Opera Weekly if difficult to be in "such constant" heavy stories, she stated, "We laugh at our scheduling producer because she always feels bad. She's like, 'I don't mean to kill you, but you dabble.' I do. I am in every set, which is great. It's fun, but it's exhausting. Right now, I'm like, "Sleep!"

In early 2007, rumors circulated that Havins would not be renewing her contract as Babe Carey once it expired later in the year. After her husband and All My Children co-star at the time, Justin Bruening, exited the show, the rumors gained momentum.

James Harmon Brown and Barbara Esensten, new head writers of the series, were reluctant to state whether or not Havins would be departing the soap opera. In their interview with TV Guide, the two remained ambiguous about the matter, though hinting at a recast. Barbara Esensten commented:

It’s out there that we will probably lose her, and it certainly isn’t our choice. However, we’re still writing the show as if she’s not leaving. If we should have to recast Babe, we’ll help the actor take over the part by writing specifically for the new actor like what we did with the Greenlee recast. We saw some little things in Sabine Singh (Greenlee), so we wrote for her accordingly, but you get into real trouble when you completely change the character for a recast. Luckily, Jim and I don’t have any trouble separating the actor from a character because the latter is really paramount in our eyes.

Havins leaving the series was confirmed when, on September 4, 2007, Soap Opera Digest reported that actress Amanda Baker would be stepping into the role following Havins's departure. Havins portrayed Babe Carey for four years, but decided to leave to pursue other acting opportunities. To her fans, she left a message of appreciation and content:

Dear Friends,

I just filmed my final scene as Arabella "Babe" Carey on All My Children. Sitting in my dressing room, I have taken a moment to reflect on the past four years of my life both professionally and personally. What an incredible experience it has been! Not only have I gained life-long friendships with the cast, crew, and you — the viewers; I found my amazing husband. I couldn't have asked for a more rewarding experience, but now it's time to say goodbye. What a bittersweet moment. I am really excited for this next chapter in my life, but will miss you all dearly. Thank you for your unwavering love and support. I wish you all the blessing in the world! Take care.

Love!

Alexa Havins

=== Amanda Baker ===
Following Havins's departure, viewers were adamant in their feelings that Babe should not have been recast; the views ranged from the decision having been made too soon, to recasting Babe having been unnecessary, to sentiment that only Havins is Babe. Voices expressing their discontent but also relaying their willingness to give the recast a chance were also present.

Baker, the character's recast, acknowledged the challenge of taking over a prominent character. She said she had studied scenes of Havins as Babe, and that she was focused on her portrayal as the character. Before landing the role, Baker was screen tested with actors who often interact with the character (Jacob Young, who portrays JR Chandler and Bobbie Eakes, portrayer of the character's mother, Krystal). A few days after her audition, she received a phone call informing her that she had won the part. Baker said that she was treated with a warm welcome from the rest of the cast and Havins herself, and that this has made her feel at home while on set.

Baker described working with Michael E. Knight (Tad Martin) and Eakes as a fun but somewhat intimidating experience. "They are naturals at it!" she stated. She said that Eakes helped her feel more comfortable during her first few weeks as Babe, and to get a better understanding of the character. "She came up to me the first day we worked together and offered to go over lines together and help me with anything I needed. She is a sweetheart," said Baker. Baker revealed that in her spare time in between takes as the character, she managed to find something to keep entertained by. "It seems like there is always something to do when you have down time on the set," she said. "I either run lines with the other actors or hang out in the hair and makeup room. I love those ladies!" Adding to Baker's enjoyment on the set was Young. "He is always cracking jokes!" stated Baker.

After a year as Babe, Baker voiced that her time as the character had been "awesome!" once she "got [there] and got settled." "I always wanted to live in New York City, so that was a dream come true!" She added that "New York has so much culture" and she had been able to grow as a person and actor. "It's good that you can be given a script and learn 40 pages and feel comfortable with that. You get to know so much about the character that you don't question things, you just do it instantaneously," she said.

When asked if it was difficult to take on a role that "so many fans" associate with another actress, Baker stated, "It was. I fortunately had the opportunity to work with her on her last day, which was my first day." Baker said that it "was kind of bittersweet, but when you go into a character who has been established by another actor, it's hard to take on." "You want everybody to love you but a lot of people don't like change. In time, though, people get used to it," she said.

Baker explained how Babe had grown since her portrayal of the character. "I think that she has become a lot more responsible," stated Baker. "She's definitely made some changes within herself, become more mature. At one point in time, especially with JR, a lot of her choices were careless and she thought too much with her heart."

After Brown and Esensten were fired as writers of the series, new head writer Charles Pratt, Jr. ultimately decided to kill Babe off. In an interview with Soap Opera Digest before her final episodes aired, Baker stated, "Going out with a bang is definitely better than going out with a whimper, and I'm going out with a bang!"

== Reception ==
=== Bianca and Babe friendship ===
Bianca and Babe's friendship became popular with viewers while both characters were pregnant. The relationship was described as a "beautiful friendship" by Soap Opera Digest. Within the series, when the two give birth to their children on the same night (Bianca to Miranda and Babe to Little Adam), their bond further endeared them to the audience. Of the birth scenes, actress Eden Riegel, Bianca's portrayer, stated, "I had done so much research. I read books [like] What to Expect When You're Expecting. I watched the TLC series A Baby Story. It felt like I watched hundreds of episodes! As soon as I got home I'd be watching women give birth on TV." Riegel added that one of her makeup artists was pregnant and invited her to go along to a Lamaze class. She sat in a room "full of pregnant Upper West Siders" and practiced breathing exercises.

Havins prepared for the birth scenes beforehand as well. "I got books and spoke to my mom," she said. "Everyone that had a child I was picking their brain, and there were some really great things online that helped." Havins stated, "And for some reason I have always watched Maternity Ward on TLC and just to see it firsthand was great. I wanted it to be no makeup, no lip gloss...I wanted to make it [look] real."

Bianca (Eden Riegel) and Babe's (Alexa Havins) ruse to fool JR left a group of viewers hoping that the scam would result in an actual romance between the two (2004).

In early 2004, there were viewers who believed Bianca to be secretly in love with Babe and hoped Bianca and Babe's relationship would become sexually intimate; this was witnessed by fansites for the pairing, emails being sent to the ABC studio and message board postings. AfterEllen.com, a website that focuses on the portrayal of lesbians and bisexual women in the media, eventually took notice and briefly commented:

...fueled in part by a late summer episode showing Bianca and Babe in bed together (a ruse to trap Babe's husband), which spawned a whole new subset of fans rooting for a Bianca-Babe pairing.

=== Baby switch reveal ===
By late 2004, viewers largely found the Bianca and Babe friendship unappealing. This was specifically due to Babe knowingly keeping Bianca from her own child. Babe is initially unaware that her child has been switched with Bianca's and that Bianca's child, the one she is caring for, is still alive and not dead as she has been told. However, once convinced by Krystal to keep Bianca's child as her own in order to save JR from heartbreak, she does as advised. Due to her guilt, she goes as far as to name Bianca godmother of the child. Infuriated by these events, viewers longed for Bianca to discover the truth. On December 7, 2004, this request was given to fans. Described as "Babe's long-overdue confessional" and beginning of redemption, she confesses to Bianca the truth about their children.

Havins and Riegel described what went into taping the moment Bianca discovers that her child is alive and Babe's deception. "It was crazy!" said Riegel of the "grueling" day. "It was insane, in fact. [Havins] and I were on the set from 9 a.m. to like 7:30 at night, just the two of us." Havins agreed and relayed, "It was so intense to tape. It was a long, long day, a 12-hour tape day." They were warned by All My Children executives that the episode would be "especially" demanding. "I don't think they've ever handed that much material to just two actresses before, so they wanted us to be prepared," said Riegel. "It was the most dialogue I've ever had in my entire life. To the point where several weeks before they gave me the script, our producer, Julie [Hanan Carruthers], sat us down and said to us, 'This is just so important.,'" added Havins. "And she turned to me and said, 'We're almost nervous because it's so much material. If it's too much, let us know.' It was that dialogue-heavy."

Riegel found humor in the situation and said, "Unfortunately, we only got the script like three days ahead of time! But hey! We're old pros." When asked if they were intimidated by the challenge of the reveal scenes, Riegel asserted that she "wasn't scared at all," and clarified that it "was a good challenge" and "one of those things where it's like, 'This is what I do. This is what I love.'" She said, "To have all that material and to be there in the moment ... I didn't want to be in any other place." She found it exciting. Having waited for the moment "for a long time," it turned out to be "a big pay-off." She added:

But I was a little nervous because this was definitely a very, very special episode. That was the biggest challenge to me; I was going in there knowing, 'This is the moment.' I kept having to make myself laugh and leave set and play with my friends in the hair and makeup room and just sort of try to view the day as though it was just an average taping day because the last thing those scenes needed from my character's perspective was that sense of gravity, that feeling of, 'This is so important.' Because it was not a big deal for my character — she had no idea what was coming.

Havins agreed with Riegel that the reveal scenes were exciting. "I'm always up for a challenge and I work best under pressure," she said. "My competitive side kicks in. So the thought that I maybe couldn't do it made me be like, 'Oh, yeah, I'm doin' it!' We put so much preparation into it." Justin Bruening (Jamie Martin) and Jacob Young (JR) were the only other cast members in the episode. "...I worked with a private coach, we worked on it together.... We put a lot of time into this episode," Havins stated. "We usually don't have that luxury, but this time we did; this took priority. And shooting it, too, we knew it was a big deal." She revealed that the producers and director were patient with them. "And if we felt we didn't like where a take went, usually they're like, 'No, it's fine, let's move on,' but this time they were like, 'Let's do it again. We loved that take, girls, but let's try something else,' and we'd go in a totally different direction." She said, "They took the time and they were as invested in this episode as [Riegel] and I were, so that was a really good feeling. We were all there, we were all in it together, and hopefully, the finished product shows it."

In 2006, Havins was asked if she felt that Babe had been redeemed since the baby switch. Havins replied, "More or less. That's not something that can be done overnight; it takes time. And I don't think it's necessarily acts, like one heroic act, that redeem someone." She clarified:

It's just showing change. She's very remorseful and there's regret with the whole situation. It's one thing if somebody didn't feel sorry for what they did, but she repented for her sins. Everyone has a past. Everyone makes mistakes. The only thing you can do is move on and try to be a better person from that point forward.

When Bianca forgives Babe in 2007 for keeping her child from her, there were viewers who still felt that it was due to Bianca being in love with Babe, and were upset that Bianca could not seem to resist any interaction with her. In a 2007 interview with TV Guide, Havins seemed perplexed that a significant number of viewers had still not forgiven Babe for the baby switch, and felt that the character had been redeeming herself.

== See also ==
- JR Chandler and Babe Carey
