= AJ Chandler =

- All My Children character
- Eric Nelsen as AJ Chandler
- Portrayed by: Tate Berney (2010–2011); Eric Nelsen (2013); (and child actors)
- Duration: 2004–2011; 2013
- First appearance: March 22, 2004
- Last appearance: September 2, 2013
- Created by: Megan McTavish
- Introduced by: Julie Hanan Carruthers (2004); Frank Valentini (2004); Ginger Smith (2013)
- Crossover appearances: One Life to Live
- Tate Berney as AJ Chandler
In-universe information
- Other names: Asa "Ace" Buchanan II; James Carey
- Occupation: Student
- Family: Chandler; Cortlandt/Cooney
- Father: JR Chandler
- Mother: Babe Carey
- Adoptive mother: Marissa Tasker
- Grandparents: Adam Chandler; Dixie Cooney; David Hayward; Krystal Carey; Roy Tasker (adoptive); Lydia Tasker (adoptive)
- Uncles: Miguel Reyes; Oliver Castillo
- Aunts: Skye Chandler (legal); Hayley Vaughan; Anna Chandler; Colby Chandler; Kathy Martin; Marissa Tasker; Leora Hayward; Jenny Martin
- First cousins: Lila Rae Alcazar; Enzo Santos
- Other relatives: Seabone Hunkle; Bess Cooney; Charles Hayward; Vanessa Bennett; Lottie Chandler; Lanie Cortlandt Rampal; Di Henry; Gwyneth Bennett Stone; Julie Rand Chandler (adoptive); Bobby Warner (adoptive); Mickey Warner; Asher Pike; Sam Grey (adoptive); Stuart Chandler; Will Cortlandt; Del Henry; Leo du Pres; Trey Kenyon; Earl Carey; Palmer Cortlandt; Ross Chandler; Scott Chandler (adoptive); Nina Cortlandt; Andrew Cortlandt (adoptive); Peter Cortlandt; Caleb Cortlandt; Frankie Stone; Maggie Stone

AJ Chandler also known as Adam "AJ" Chandler III is a fictional character from the American serial drama, All My Children. From April 29 to September 2, 2013, the role was portrayed by Eric Nelsen.

== Casting ==
The role of AJ Chandler was originated by child actors Aidan and Liam O'Donnell from 2004 to 2005, also appearing on sister soap One Life to Live during the baby switch storyline involving both soaps. From 2005 to 2008, the role was portrayed by Jarred Sturman and Shane Passaro and by Declan and Rory McTigue from 2008 to 2010 and by Tate Berney from 2010 until the show's series finale on September 23, 2011. Eric Nelsen portrayed the role during the soap's brief revival in 2013.

== Development ==
Eric Nelsen, who portrayed the character in 2013, revealed in 2020 that AJ was supposed to have a storyline that would see him revealed to be gay. The soap's producer, Ginger Smith, and two other staff members took Nelson out to lunch in New York to explain the storyline and asked Nelsen if he would be comfortable with it, which he was. Nelsen explained, "It was really cool how they approached it, and I was like, '100% completely.' I look at what Chandler Massey (ex-Will Horton) did on Days and where that brought him and his storyline, and I thought, 'Yes, there’s going to be so much more depth and stuff to play than just being this fun little rich kid.' At the time, there really wasn't much depth to AJ. So, I was like, 'Yes. I will be all over it. Absolutely.'" However, the soap was cancelled before the storyline played out. Nelsen ended up portraying a gay character on The Bay, which the actor speculated may have been influenced by the cancelled storyline after he mentioned it to the show's creator Gregori J. Martin.

== Storylines ==
In 2004, a MEDEVAC helicopter carrying Bianca Montgomery and Babe Carey, piloted by Babe's ex-husband Paul Cramer, crashes in a storm. Both women are pregnant and give birth during the crisis. Paul's half-sister Kelly from nearby Llanview has just miscarried her own baby; Paul gives Babe's son to Kelly and gives Bianca's daughter to Babe, telling Bianca that her baby died. Unaware of the infant's origins, Kelly brings Babe and JR's son back to Llanview, passing him off as her child with her husband Kevin Buchanan.

Kevin and Kelly name the baby Asa "Ace" Buchanan II, after Kevin's grandfather Asa Buchanan. Over the next year, their marriage crumbles and Kevin tries to secure custody, but fails. Meanwhile, Kelly discovers that Paul had stolen Ace from his mother; Paul, desperate for cash, blackmails Kelly by threatening to reveal the secret to Kevin and Llanview. Armed with the truth, Kelly realizes they must return the child to his parents; though broken hearted, they do.

Babe and JR wage their own custody battle over their son, now named Adam Chandler III. At one point Babe goes on the run with JR's former stepbrother Jamie Martin, giving her son the alias James Carey. He is often referred to as "Little Adam" or "Little A" by his parents, and soon by everyone else.

In mid-2008, JR and Babe reunite and take their time in their new relationship. Babe soon dies due to injuries caused by a tornado. Little Adam is now being raised by his father after his mother's death. She was killed on October 23, 2008 to save him from being killed.

After his mother's death, Krystal divorced Tad, got back together with David and become married in 2009. David seeks custody of Little Adam by making JR seem like an unfit father, but JR fights him on this. Due to the judge at the custody hearing not being able to decide which of the two men Little Adam would be better off with, Jesse and Angie get temporary custody of him. JR gets Little Adam back after Krystal lies on the stand to protect herself in order to keep Adam from revealing a secret about her.

JR marries his aunt Marissa Tasker on October 21, 2009, while JR is dealing with lymphoma. Marissa legally adopts him on March 3, 2010, and he now goes by the name "AJ".

Even though he doesn't know it, his father JR is having an affair with his ex-step-grandmother Annie Chandler and his parents are having problems in their relationship because of JR's affair with Annie.

JR relapses into alcoholism in the summer of 2011, after Marissa reveals that she reciprocates the feelings of and is now dating Bianca Montgomery (the lesbian mother of AJ's good friends Miranda and Gabby). A frightened AJ spurns his father and turns to Marissa, and his de facto step-grandfather Tad Martin for guidance and comfort.

On April 29, 2013, AJ reappeared on the online reboot of All My Children. He is shown to be the best friend of Bianca's daughter, Miranda Montgomery and both have been aged to teenagers due to the time jump. AJ is frequently seen consoling or advising Miranda.
