= Reese Williams and Bianca Montgomery =

Reese and Bianca
- Reese and Bianca in their wedding dresses
- Duration: 2008–09
- Introduced by: Julie Hanan Carruthers
In-universe information
- Other names: Rianca; Breese
- Family: Kane
- Spouse: 2009–11
- Children: Gabrielle Montgomery

Reese Williams and Bianca Montgomery are fictional characters and a lesbian couple from the ABC daytime drama All My Children. Reese was portrayed by Tamara Braun, and Bianca was portrayed by Eden Riegel. On Internet message boards, the pairing is commonly referred to by the portmanteaus "Rianca" (for Reese and Bianca) and "Breese" (for Bianca and Reese). The couple debuted in October 2008 and is groundbreaking for featuring the first same-sex marriage proposal, as well as the first legal same-sex wedding and marriage, on an American soap opera. In addition, the pairing's family is the first onscreen family made up of same-sex parents in the history of American daytime television.

The couple's wedding took place on February 13, 2009. Though the wedding received praise for being the first on an American soap opera, it also received criticism. The couple's romance was the subject of controversy, from writing and development to fan dissatisfaction and creator commentary.

== Background ==
=== Writing and portrayals ===
Eden Riegel was cast in 2000 as Bianca Montgomery, the lesbian daughter of Erica Kane. Riegel left the role and returned several times, before permanently retiring from the role in 2010. She attributed her 2008 return to the wishes of her fans. Through the web presence she created for herself during her web series Imaginary Bitches, fans let her know how much they wanted her back on the show. "I definitely wanted to fulfill that desire if I could," she said. Riegel then let the show know she was willing to come back. "[The] next thing I knew I got a call and they said, 'Okay, we've got something for you,'" she said. The story the All My Children writers came up with involved a new love interest for Bianca, Reese Williams, who would be portrayed by daytime alumni Tamara Braun. Riegel addressed specific reasons she made the return. "It was the storyline that got me excited," she said. "I always want to come back. I love All My Children, and they're my family. I barely need an excuse—it's usually just about timing." Riegel added that "this time it was the fact that they were going to have Bianca in a committed relationship". She stated, "It was very, very important to me, and I was so glad to hear that. In the context of that, there's some pretty exciting story line plot points that I'm aware of that are dramatic and fun to play and enticing as an actress." In addition, Riegel was enthused about playing opposite Braun. "It means so much [that Braun was cast] because it shows how committed AMC is to this pairing," Riegel said in an interview with Soap Opera Weekly. "We're going to have some serious stuff to play- they aren't going to waste her talents."

"I identified with all of them on a human level. I must find a common human thread with all the characters I play; otherwise, I fear I would be playing a caricature. Carly and Ava were the most dynamic and colorful. Reese was the most normal, yet she had the most historic impact. The storyline I was in with Eden Riegel (who played Bianca Montgomery) was nominated for a GLAAD Award, and I feel very proud of the work that Eden and I did portraying the first same-sex married and parenting couple. We tried to bring honesty and integrity to the story we were given. I was so proud of the show for bringing the issue to the forefront and for being a part of it."

— Braun on which of her daytime roles she most identified with (2012).

After portraying Ava Vitali on the NBC soap opera Days of Our Lives, Tamara Braun did not expect to appear on another daytime drama so soon. "I didn't want to do another soap, I was ready to do other things," Braun said in an interview with TV Guide. "But this was an opportunity I couldn't pass up." All My Children head writer Charles Pratt, Jr. was creating the role of Reese with Braun in mind when he offered her the role. The story he presented her convinced Braun to take the part. "[T]his is a story that's groundbreaking and over due," Braun said. "Two female soap characters having a baby together is unprecedented. I wanted to be part of something that could have a strong and positive impact and help give same-sex couples their rightful place in the world of daytime drama."

Since coming out as a lesbian, Bianca's romantic entanglements have consisted of sexual confusion, unrequited love, bad timing, and betrayal, including a short-lived romance with Lena Kundera (Olga Sosnovska) and an on-but-mostly-off-screen romantic relationship with Maggie Stone (Elizabeth Hendrickson). The pairing of Reese and Bianca finally allowed the character to be scripted into an on-screen committed relationship. The show had been criticized in the past for not giving Bianca a full-fledged on-screen romance. When asked by The Advocate if she felt Bianca's pairing with Reese, especially by bringing on a recognized name (Braun), would make a difference, Riegel replied, "I think there has to be a difference." She responded to the criticism about Bianca's lack of onscreen intimacy with past romantic partners. "I don't know if the criticism is entirely warranted," she asserted. "I know I was glad that the show's priority was in giving me good stories, and I thought that they did go further than anyone else had ever gone, so I always thought that they should be commended." Riegel added, however, that she knows the lack of onscreen intimacy between Bianca and the character's past romantic love interests left fans and herself unsatisfied. "She never really got to have the kind of relationship that she deserved," stated Riegel. Riegel said of Bianca's return this time, "you’ll see a couple of things you haven’t seen in a while".

The writers characterized Reese as "very warm and real and very expressive with her feelings". Her relationship with Bianca is also "very" affectionate. In the past whenever a kiss was written in for Bianca, significant soap opera press usually focused in on the moment as an event and another kiss usually took a year or longer to happen following the immediate shift of making her romance more physically reserved than heterosexual relationships on the show. The atmosphere was different for Reese and Bianca's relationship. Braun said in an interview with Shewired.com that she would not have been able to portray the character as well back then because Reese is so affectionate. "This character is warm and open and for me to play a woman who's in love, it's important for me to be able to express that," she said. "Perhaps that's one of the reasons they wanted me to play this." Braun and Riegel have portrayed their characters as in love and committed to each other. Reese was also scripted early on as the love of Bianca's life, negating Bianca's previous true love Maggie.

When asked how she felt Bianca and Maggie (BAM) fans would respond to the Reese and Bianca pairing, Riegel stated, "I'm pretty sure BAM fans will never be entirely satisfied until they have their two favorite girls together forever. But Lizzie's [Elizabeth Hendrickson] been so successful on Y&R [as Chloe Mitchell ], and is so obviously happy there, I am hoping they are able to embrace this pairing for the time being."

=== Wardrobe ===
All My Children's wardrobe director, David R. Zyla, collaborated with Braun in creating the wardrobe for the Reese Williams character. The two had worked together before when Braun portrayed Carly Corinthos on General Hospital. While bringing their ideas together, they tried to make sure they did not make Reese into too much of a cliché. "I like that she goes from really strong pants with a buttoned shirt and tie, which is so on trend but is also just great style, to wearing dresses," Braun said. Reese's wardrobe goes back and forth between the two different types of style which allows Braun and Zyla to play with her fashion. "She's an architect, so to me, I would think she has a real eye for lines," said Braun. "She appreciates form and beauty, and the look we came up with I would describe as 'streamlined with a flair'."

For Reese and Bianca's wedding, the dresses of the brides were chosen to complement each other by featuring "a long, lean, Grecian flowy feeling". As Bianca, Riegel was dressed in a Monique Lhuillier one shoulder sari-inspired dress with gold beading. Her shoes were gold Aldos. Reese's dress was designed to fit her style as an architect. Her dress was designed by Andrew Gn. It was "a fit to flair" which featured center beading applique and the shoes she wore were off white.

The characters' family, including their daughter Gabrielle, were "dressed in the wedding's color palette: deep red." Haley Evans, who portrays the flower girl and Bianca's daughter Miranda Montgomery, wore a red velvet Lucy Sykes dress. Bianca's mother, Erica's red dress was designed by Gustavo Cadile.

== Storylines ==
Most of Bianca and Reese's relationship takes place offscreen in Paris, where they live with Bianca's daughter Miranda Montgomery. They decide they want to expand their family with another baby. Zach Slater comes to Paris and meets Reese. He agrees to be their sperm donor, and none of them tell Bianca's sister and Zach's wife, Kendall Hart Slater, for fear that she will say no. When Bianca is close to delivering her and Reese's baby, she returns to Pine Valley to tell Kendall. Before she can, a tornado hits and Kendall is injured. After an ambulance takes Kendall to the hospital, Bianca goes into labor and Zach helps her deliver their baby, a girl. Bianca and Zach later find out that Kendall is comatose. Bianca worries for Kendall but also fears how she would react to the news of Zach fathering her second child.

Reese comes to Pine Valley not long after the tornado with Miranda. She proposes marriage to Bianca, and Bianca accepts. Reese and Bianca decide to have a commitment ceremony in Pine Valley and to get married later in Paris, since gay marriage is not yet legal in Pennsylvania where Pine Valley is located. Those plans change as they plan to legally marry in Connecticut. They set their wedding date on Valentine's Day. Bianca's cousin, Greenlee Smythe, also plans to marry her former husband, Ryan Lavery, on that same day. The two couples arrange for a double wedding.

Bianca finds out that Reese was once engaged to a man and that she is Reese's first lesbian partner. She is hurt Reese did not tell her this. She also becomes increasingly insecure in their relationship as she sees her fiance getting closer with Zach. Bianca decides to test Reese's love for her. She tells Zach and Reese that she will be leaving town, but she secretly stays to spy on them. When Bianca witnesses Zach and Reese in an embrace as Zach gives Reese a kiss to the forehead, she believes Reese is cheating on her and flees. She ends up in a car accident soon afterward, but suffers no serious injuries. Zach and Reese rush to the hospital to see Bianca, and Bianca explains that she saw them embracing. She asks if they are in love. Zach and Reese say no. Despite this, Bianca is furious with Reese and does not want to talk with her. Reese frustratedly leaves the hospital and sends Bianca a note saying she plans to leave. After reading the note, Bianca hurries home to convince Reese to stay; she says that she loves her and knows that she is not romantically interested in Zach. Reese says that she would not have left, regardless.

Zach and Reese continue to bond, and Reese and Bianca continue planning their wedding. However, tragedy strikes when Kendall and Bianca's brother, Josh Madden, is killed by Zach after Josh has taken Reese and his family members hostage. Zach is determined to have Josh's heart be donated to Kendall, who needs a heart transplant to save her life. Erica, the siblings' mother, makes the painful decision to take Josh off life support and donate his heart to Kendall.

Kendall awakes from her coma days after her transplant. She is told of having been recently comatose, about her heart transplant, that Josh is dead and she has his heart, and of Bianca's engagement to Reese. Kendall is naturally overwhelmed by all the news, but handles it well. When she is told of Zach having fathered Bianca's second child, she seems numb to this news also. Her family had thought she would take this particular news badly, but Kendall seems okay with it. Greenlee (Kendall's best friend) and Erica, however, are the only ones to believe that Kendall is not okay with Zach being the father.

Kendall moves back home not long after being awake from her coma. Reese can sense that Kendall is uneasy with her and Bianca living there. She talks with Kendall alone, but it is apparent that Kendall is distant. After their conversation, Reese leaves the room and Zach comes in. Kendall tells Zach that she wants Reese and Bianca out of their home. Zach later obliges Kendall's wishes and sets Reese and Bianca up at his casino to stay. Reese and Bianca get into a fight while there, but later reconcile.

The day before Reese and Bianca's wedding, Kendall refuses to attend the ceremony. Zach tries to convince her to change her mind, saying that she is acting childish, but Kendall explains that he and Bianca betrayed her. Bianca receives word that Kendall will not be coming to her wedding and immediately rushes to Kendall's home to insist she attend. Kendall says that she will only come to the wedding as long as Bianca promises to leave for Paris soon afterward and take Reese and baby Gabrielle with her. Bianca reluctantly agrees. Later that night, Reese and Bianca have a wedding rehearsal. Kendall picks up a wine glass and makes a snarky toast to Reese and Bianca but particularly to Reese. Reese becomes upset; she grabs a bottle of wine, a glass, and walks off. Bianca follows her, but Reese wants to be alone. Zach later finds Reese and consoles her. He pulls her into a hug and then kisses her passionately; Reese kisses back. After a few moments, with Ryan having witnessed their kiss, unknown to them, they agree that the kiss never happened and that they already have people they are deeply in love with. Ryan later confronts Zach about the kiss, but Zach says it was nothing and nonchalantly walks away from Ryan.

On their wedding day, Reese and Bianca are blissfully happy before the ceremony. Bianca feels that maybe she should stay in Pine Valley. She later tells her mother this and says that she will stay, which Kendall overhears and subsequently decides not to attend the wedding after all.

Without Kendall, Reese and Bianca exchange wedding vows on February 12, 2009. Ryan, however, has called off his wedding with Greenlee after seeing Zach and Reese kiss. He tells Greenlee that he knows Zach and Reese have been sleeping together and that he does not want to be married next to them, but he promises her that he will give her the wedding of her dreams. Greenlee then tries to get in touch with Zach; she wants to know if he has really been having an affair with Reese. When Greenlee cannot get in touch with Zach, she drives off on her motorcycle in search of him. Also on the road are Zach and Kendall in a car arguing. Kendall ends up in the wrong lane and nearly hits Greenlee. Both try to swerve out of the other's way, leaving Greenlee to drive off the road. When Greenlee's body is not found, she is presumed dead. Reese, Bianca and others soon find out about Greenlee being missing. Ryan tells Bianca that Zach and Reese have been engaging in a sexual relationship with each other. Bianca goes to Reese to tell her that their relationship and marriage is over. She later sends Reese annulment papers, and returns to Paris with Miranda and Gabrielle.

On April 24, 2009, Bianca comes back to Pine Valley after having discussed with Zach the reasons she left. After later talking over her and Reese's relationship problems with Zach and Kendall, the couple reconcile and hope that they can work their relationship out. They return to Paris together with their children, and later remarry. In 2010, Bianca returns to Pine Valley for a family emergency, and soon wants to stay. After Reese decides that she is not coming back to Pine Valley, Bianca decides to end their marriage for good and now is single.

== Reception and impact ==
=== First same-sex marriage and critical praise ===
Reese and Bianca are the first same-sex couple to become engaged for marriage on an American soap opera. On October 31, 2008, AfterEllen.com founder Sarah Warn stated, "Bianca (Eden Riegel) and Reese's (Tamara Braun) much-anticipated engagement finally took place on ABC's daytime drama All My Children today (the first lesbian marriage proposal on daytime TV), and for once, the AMC writers didn't disappoint." In addition, the couple has been allowed the type of physical intimacy not previously allowed between same-sex couples within the series. Their kiss following the marriage proposal was seen as a change in the show's attitude about portraying homosexual relationships. "...They had an actual kiss—a real one, not a peck on the cheek," stated Warn. She added that the kiss was significant due to romantic kisses, explicit or otherwise, between two women on All My Children or on any daytime drama being rare.

Reese and Bianca's wedding on February 13, 2009 marked a first-time event for a daytime drama; the couple exchange vows in the first legal same-sex marriage in American daytime history. (Within the show, the wedding took place on February 12, 2009, Valentine's Day.) Gay & Lesbian Alliance Against Defamation (GLAAD) president Neil G. Giuliano released a statement in honor of the milestone:

Bianca and Reese’s wedding is a joyful day that countless people -- gay and straight alike -- dream of for themselves and the ones they love. It’s a celebration of love, commitment, and family, and we’re thrilled that All My Children’s viewers will be able to experience the joy of that day right alongside them.

In addition, All My Children was nominated for a GLAAD Award in January 2009. The wedding event was featured on CNN on February 16, 2009 following the continuation of the February 13, 2009 episode. The CNN report featured positive and negative thoughts about the wedding. The View discussed the wedding the following day, and relayed that angry letters had been sent to them about the wedding. Regardless of this, they applauded ABC for featuring the ceremony.

=== Criticism and controversy ===
==== Gabrielle Montgomery ====
In October 2008, with Bianca's return to the series during a series of tornadoes striking fictional town Pine Valley, Bianca was reported to be pregnant with her second child. Fans immediately began speculating on who the sperm donor was, which caught the attention of soap opera press, LGBT press, and other media outlets. TV Guide reported that "nobody knows [Bianca's] in town until her brother-in-law finds her under the rubble". SOAPnet.com stated, "The physical affects [sic] of the tornado are miniscule [sic] compared to the ripples Bianca's presence creates." Another soap opera website sensationalized the story by stating, "When Bianca returns to town this time, she will have a brand new 'someone special' in her life and a big surprise—Bianca is pregnant! And wait until everyone finds out who the 'father' is."

Fans, aware that Miranda Montgomery, Bianca's first child, was the result of rapist Michael Cambias, speculated Zach Slater as the child's biological father. Zach was Michael's older brother. Fans theorized that Bianca wanted a baby closely related to Miranda and asked Zach to father the child. If Bianca were already pregnant when she got to Pine Valley, then Zach could have "donated" last time Bianca was in town, even though the timing within the series did not correlate with this. Another theory concluded Bianca's former love Zarf/Zoe, a pre-op MTF transsexual, as the father; the argument arose over a website putting "father" in quotations. The "father" is really a "mother" trapped in a "father's" body, the theory entailed.

Zach was eventually confirmed as the father of the child through an article in Soap Opera Digest. Bianca's reasons for asking Zach to be the donor and doing so without informing her sister and Zach's wife, Kendall Hart Slater, infuriated viewers. They reasoned that neither Bianca nor Zach would do this to Kendall. AfterEllen.com writer/co-founder Sarah Warn stated of the explanation behind how Bianca conceived Gabrielle, "This storyline is all kinds of wrong—and not just because it makes me feel like I need a shower. Bianca and Kendall have a strong, very close relationship." Warn further expressed in the article that she could not fathom that Bianca would make "a move like this" without discussing it with Kendall first. Bianca's reason, however, was that she did not want to give Kendall a chance to say no.

Bianca wanting her children closely related was seen by viewers as unneeded, since the children would still be closely related through Bianca. Warn, in the forememtioned AfterEllen article, relayed, "...Bianca wanting a baby closely related to Miranda, whose father was a rapist and whose grandfather was a mass murderer. I’m no geneticist, but propagating that DNA seems risky at best." The choice for Zach as the father made Miranda and the new child not only half-siblings but cousins as well, which some found "icky".

Reese being introduced as Bianca's love interest was the first time an American soap opera would showcase same-sex partners having decided to create a child together. Riegel set up the Reese and Bianca storyline and what the couple's introduction entailed to the New York Daily News, "Zach is looking for Kendall [in the immediate aftermath of the tornado]. He is shocked to find Bianca. Nobody knew she was coming to Pine Valley. Zach discovers Kendall's lifeless body and resuscitates her. Paramedics come, but they only have room in the vehicle for one person. Zach convinces them to take the kids, as well. He and Bianca wait." This gave the series a chance to explain Bianca's return to the audience, as they saw Bianca, clearly pregnant, sit beside Zach. "Zach agreed to be Bianca's [sperm] donor, but she failed to tell him that the pregnancy took," explained Riegel. "The reason she was not forthcoming is that Kendall was not told. Bianca came halfway across the world from France in the Cambias private jet—the only jet that can fly into a tornado—and didn't even get to tell Kendall the truth."

The writers detailed Bianca and Zach talking only briefly before Bianca was seen going into labor. Zach delivers the baby, a girl. "If there's a giant storm, Bianca will give birth," joked Riegel, referring to how Bianca's first pregnancy (with Miranda) went. Riegel clarified that the baby "is actually" Reese and Bianca's, while Zach is the sperm donor. "After Zach delivers Bianca's baby," she said, "Reese tries to get to Pine Valley, but the roads are closed. She and Miranda fly to New York to surprise Bianca." Bianca's second child is soon named Gabrielle Montgomery, with Reese's blessing. Reese and Bianca are the first same-sex partners on an American soap opera to raise a family onscreen. Bianca had previously raised Miranda with character Maggie Stone, but the interaction takes place offscreen.

==== Romance, sexual confusion, and the wedding ====
Viewers of the series noted what they considered "the many failings" of the Reese and Bianca love story. LGBT viewers were especially vocal about their discontent regarding the storyline. There were complaints that Reese was not "sufficiently integrated" into the Pine Valley canvas for the audience to invest in her relationship with Bianca, as well as complaints about the budding relationship between Reese and Bianca and their sperm donor Zach. The couple's wedding was heavily criticized. While there were viewers who felt that the wedding ceremony was a "joyous and celebratory" landmark, others were left feeling that the show missed an opportunity to make the union memorable when it cut to other story points during the wedding as Reese and Bianca exchanged vows.

Following Reese and Bianca's arrival to the series as a couple in October 2008, the writers started building a Zach and Reese friendship. To viewers, the friendship soon became somewhat sexual in nature in what they described as Reese "giving off a sexual vibe" whenever around Zach. This perception was intensified once Reese was revealed by the series to have been engaged to a man just a couple of months before becoming romantically involved with Bianca. Viewers who speculated Reese as bisexual suggested that she may be after Zach. The writers played this angle with ambiguity; they added in hug and kiss "teasers" such as Zach giving Reese a lingering peck on the cheek/neck.

Viewers became frustrated and angered by what seemed to be the writers situating a man into a lesbian love story, as well as Reese seeming to share more screentime and secrets with Zach than Bianca, and a lack of Reese and Bianca truly knowing each other. The audience had experienced sexual confusion storylines before with other former love interests of Bianca's, most notably Maggie, and were hoping that this love story would be without such confusion. At one point, Reese confesses to Zach her ambiguous feelings for him and asks him if he feels the same way for her just as "the phone [rings]" and "[saves] the day".

When asked by The Advocate in a February 12, 2009 interview about viewer concern among the LGBT community that Reese would leave Bianca for Zach and likely has romantic feelings for him, All My Children executive producer Julie Hanan Carruthers responded, "First of all, it's not true. I think what's confused in Reese's head is she has misinterpreted a friendship. Zach is one of the [few] people who have not kicked her to the curb, so to speak, in Pine Valley." Carruthers said that Reese is a confused and insecure person. "She has never wavered in her commitment to Bianca," she said. "It's solid, Reese has just had a lot of emotional stuff hit. Her family is rejecting and judging her... in both her family and Bianca's." In specific response to viewers being upset at the appearance that Reese was considering leaving Bianca for Zach, Carruthers stated, "She is not considering it. That's the audience rewriting what's there. It's not being written that way at all. Reese has never wavered in what she wants." Carruthers acknowledged that Reese leaving Bianca for a man would upset viewers, but that "it's never been about that". "I don't know how to stress this more," she said. "Never has she played a moment of, 'I want Zach more than I want Bianca,' or 'I would leave Bianca for Zach.' He has literally just been a friend. Look, we tantalize in this genre. We do it whether we do it with heterosexual or homosexual couples. It’s what the genre is."

Despite Carruthers comments about the Zach and Reese relationship, Reese passionately engages in a kiss with Zach the same day of The Advocate February 12, 2009 interview, the night before Reese and Bianca's wedding. Carruthers explained, "The night before the wedding when Kendall, Zach’s wife, nails her with a backhanded toast, Reese gets a little drunk, and the person who consoles her is Zach." Carruthers described it as a moment where she kisses him and then realizes, "Oh, my god, what the heck am I doing? The person I love is Bianca, and the person you love is Kendall. What just happened?" That moment, said Carruthers, is what unravels Reese's world and "where someone tells somebody and it grows bigger than it ever was".

In addition to viewers being upset by Reese's actions, AfterEllen.com was frustrated by Reese's ambiguous involvement with Zach and stated, "ABC touting the wedding as a 'historic daytime event' just ticks [them] off". Carruthers said, "[Reese] may not be the poster child to represent the lesbian women in the world. But at the same time, she is very responsible, as are the writers portraying a woman dealing with a crisis and trying to ground herself in her identity." She relayed that though Reese and Bianca would break up due to the Zach and Reese kiss, Bianca would return in the spring to give resolution to the story. "The journey Reese has to take to earn Bianca’s trust again is significant," said Carruthers.

On February 16, 2009, in response to the February 12, 2009 interview by The Advocate, television program Soap's Up from Canada's A-Channel criticized Carruthers for insulting the audience's intelligence by saying that the audience had been rewriting the storyline. The program stated that while "it is good" for All My Children to feature a same-sex wedding, they have not been impressed by the love story and that a show's producer should have more control over the way a character behaves.

On February 27, 2009, Warn, who had previously praised the series in her AfterEllen October 31, 2008 column for the portrayal of the couple's onscreen physical affection, criticized the structure and overall writing of the romance. "...many queer and straight viewers began heading for the door when it became clear that the kisses and the wedding plans were just new ways to dress up the same old depressing and boring lesbian storylines about sperm donors, custody battles, and sexually confused lesbians," she said. "From an entertainment perspective, some of the conflict between Reese and Bianca at the end was interesting, but overall, their storyline became boring and predictable pretty quickly."

Warn said that the February 12, 2009 statements by Carruthers regarding Reese insulted the audience's intelligence. The statements were not supported by what the audience saw, she said. "There is validity to the argument Carruthers is making—that there simply aren't enough romantic-pairing options for long-running lesbian characters unless you're willing to change the general makeup of the established cast of characters," said Warn. "This logic is frequently used by TV writers and showrunners to justify minimal lesbian visibility, bad lesbian storylines, and the growing trend towards adding bisexual characters to their shows instead of lesbians." Warn said that while this may be an understandable decision for an individual show, when it is happening on various shows, the viewer is "left with a television landscape populated by lesbians who sleep with men, or no lesbians at all, only bisexual characters (who also primarily sleep with men)" and that All My Children "fed right into" this with the Reese and Bianca storyline.

Marrying Bianca off to someone the audience doesn't know isn't a smart move, but marrying her off to someone who cheats on her the night before their wedding feels like one punch in the gut too many.

In this way, Bianca is actually very representative of queer TV viewers in America—we've already suffered enough bad and boring representation on TV, thank you, we don't need any more.

With such a bad setup, it's no wonder audiences have reacted negatively to this storyline. No amount of lesbian wedding promos can make up for such glaring structural flaws.

— Sarah Warn

On March 23, 2009, The Advocate interviewed Braun about her portrayal of Reese and the Reese and Bianca storyline. "From my point of view, Reese is not in love with Zach and she never has been," said Braun. "As far as the kiss, any doubt she may have had about her relationship with Bianca dissolved immediately after it happened. It was a moment of needing a connection. It was not about being in love with Zach. She was drunk, upset, and it was unfortunate. It was a terrible mistake. As far as I am concerned, Reese has always been in love with Bianca."

Braun said Reese's feelings toward Zach can be summed up as a "dear, dear friendship and connection on an intimate but not sexual level". She said that Reese has never had a clear point of view. "One minute I think I am playing a storyline that is going one way, and then there is a detour. So I have to make it clear in my head. Yes, it’s not fun playing the outsider who has nobody, and no strong leg to stand on," said Braun. "Reese has been under a microscope since she came to town and doesn't have any family to support her. There is no one around who knows the essence of who she really is."

Braun clarified that, in some ways, this was "not the story" [she] came on to play but that it was in other ways. "We were getting married, which is why I wanted to do the role," she said. "I thought that we were going to show what it’s like to be a same-sex couple in a loving, committed relationship dealing with what life throws at them and the outside world and how they are treated. There are a lot of story points and ideas I thought we were going to hit upon, but they decided to take it another route."

In response to the LGBT community being left "very disgruntled" with the Reese and Bianca storyline, Braun said, "I am sorry they were not happy, because one of my main reasons for taking this role was to be able to give a positive voice to same-sex couples." Braun agreed that "the issues" went "off-point" and that she understood why it was difficult for viewers to root for the Reese and Bianca couple. She thanked the viewers who supported the pairing despite the way the romance was told. "I was shocked by [the positive feedback] because I know it was not the story they wanted," she said, "but they were so happy to be represented on TV and on a soap."

===== "Blame" and fan retaliation =====
On April 13, 2009, Charles Pratt, Jr., head writer of the series, was interviewed by TV Guide about the Reese and Bianca relationship. After saying he felt he had longer to tell the love story and that it could have been better told if not for Riegel temporarily departing as Bianca, Pratt was viewed by fans and critics as blaming Riegel for the failure of the storyline. "I was led to believe we had her for longer than we really did—suddenly I got word that Eden is leaving now," stated Pratt. "We got to play everything we wanted to with Bianca and Reese but not in the time we'd hoped for—in my mind, it was a two-year story. I guess I could have rushed to the wedding earlier so that they’d have had more time together as a married couple and then had them break up, but I think the fans would have been even more unsatisfied with that."

Despite earlier comments by Carruthers that "Reese never wavered in her commitment to Bianca" and was not bisexual, Pratt admitted that they were considering on "turning" Reese bisexual. "...if Tamara decided to stay, keeping her on the show as an angry lesbian—with no other lesbian characters on the canvas—would be kind of insane," said Pratt. "So we thought about making Reese bisexual—kind of an Anne Heche who bounces back and forth—and maybe make her an opportunistic black widow, a real bad girl. And Tamara would have been really great at that. But, ultimately, we decided to stick with the message."

Pratt's comments to TV Guide about Riegel and the storyline angered viewers and critics, who felt Pratt was being dishonest about not knowing how long Riegel was signed on for and did not admit to what they consider the true flaws of the love story. They reasoned that it was known from the beginning, to even fans of the series, that Riegel had only signed on for a four-month contract to portray the Reese and Bianca storyline and that her four-month contract should not mean that the story could not have been better written. In early 2009, Riegel briefly exited the show to focus her attention on pilot season. She had said that if the story was well written, she would extend her contract. She ultimately declined extending, but agreed to return to "tie up" the Reese and Bianca storyline for a spring 2009 "happy" ending.

Fans "retaliated" against Pratt's comments about Riegel and the storyline. Two fans created an animated online series called Pratt Falls to "skewer" the show's executives about the love story. In Season 1, Episode 1 of the parody, viewed on YouTube, a fictional Carruthers has to tell Pratt that there are "fans" who become emotionally invested in the show. The fictional Pratt asks, "Who are Bianca and Reese?" and "We have lesbians on our show?" The series, described as tongue-in-cheek, concludes its first episode with the animated Pratt announcing that he has devised a plan to blame the failed storyline on Riegel as he urges Carruthers to call TV Guide to arrange an interview.

== See also ==
- Bianca Montgomery and Maggie Stone
- Lena Kundera and Bianca Montgomery
- List of supercouples
