= Maggie Stone =

- All My Children character
- Portrayed by: Elizabeth Hendrickson
- Duration: 2002–05; 2007
- First appearance: February 4, 2002
- Last appearance: February 7, 2007
- Created by: Richard Culliton
- Introduced by: Jean Dadario Burke
In-universe information
- Occupation: Medical student
- Mother: Gwyneth Bennett Stone
- Sisters: Frankie Stone
- Aunts: Vanessa Bennett
- First cousins: David Hayward; Leo du Pres; Trey Kenyon
- Other relatives: Babe Carey; Marissa Tasker; Leora Hayward; Oliver Castillo; AJ Chandler

Maggie Stone is a fictional character from the American daytime drama All My Children. She was portrayed by actress Elizabeth Hendrickson, who also portrayed Maggie's identical twin sister Frankie Stone. The character came to Pine Valley in 2002 after Frankie's death, and befriended Bianca Montgomery whilst investigating her sister's murder. The series portrayed Bianca as having fallen in love with Maggie, with Maggie initially maintaining that she is only interested in men. The series featured her dating several men, taking a few of them to bed, sometimes out of confusion and other times out of a clear attempt to dispel her growing romantic attraction to Bianca. The two eventually become girlfriends, though heartbreak follows.

Beyond fiction, Maggie is recognized as one of the notable lesbian characters and LGBT icons in American daytime television history. TV Guide called her a "sensation".

== Background ==
=== Creation and characterization ===
Actress Elizabeth Hendrickson debuted on All My Children in 2001 as character Frankie Stone. The character was killed off after only three months on the series. Her death attracted criticism when viewers reasoned that the show was afraid to portray a homosexual romance, one that was blossoming with Frankie's developing relationship with out-and-proud lesbian Bianca Montgomery (Eden Riegel). When creator of the character, Richard Culliton, stated that she was always intended to die, it did not help ease the discontent viewers expressed about her demise. As a result, Maggie Stone, the character's identical twin sister, was created in order to bring Hendrickson back to the series.

On soaps, there are characters who are remarkably well-delineated through careful and consistent scripting. Then, there are characters whose histories are spotty, whose identities are underdeveloped—characters who seem to confound even those writing them into being. And when those characters nonetheless 'click' with viewers, it becomes obvious that tremendous credit is due to the actors assigned to filling in their abundant blanks. Elizabeth Hendrickson's Maggie Stone is precisely such a creation.

— Soap Opera Digest

Maggie debuted in 2002. Hendrickson, at first, had a difficult time differentiating her from Frankie. "Oh, my gosh, I was so afraid about that," she said. "I was trying to go for something completely different, but the problem was that the writers left it so ambiguous; the character was such a blank slate. I just decided to make her lighter, prettier [laughs]. I kept the humor; I always like to play a little bit of humor. And I was playing her straight—at first [laughs]! So I went for heterosexual, pretty, funny. And smarter!"

Hendrickson described her first day as Maggie as feeling she was actually Frankie. Her scenes were with Bianca's portrayer, Riegel, whose character thought she was Frankie. Hendrickson attributed her initial difficulty with the role to not being over Frankie yet. She eventually began to feel the difference between the two characters, and related Maggie more to herself. "I wanted to keep Maggie light, with a bit more humor," she said. "Frankie was more dark. Maggie's very true to her feelings. She's honest. She's loving and hopeful. Maggie is much closer to myself. I am an optimistic person and a realist." When detailing the difference in the characters' backgrounds and personalities further and the portrayals, she said, "Maggie went to school; Frankie didn't show up. Maggie's more feminine and knows how to control her anger. Frankie lashed out. As Maggie, I walk differently. I'm trying to concentrate on my speech more, to enunciate and act more proper."

The change in wardrobe was a factor Hendrickson especially needed to become accustomed to. "On my first day, Maggie was wearing a miniskirt," she said. "In one of the scenes, Bianca fainted to the floor, and we had to do a few takes. The one that they [used] was when I went to catch her and bent over, forgetting that I was wearing a miniskirt. When I realized, I turned to everyone and was like, '[Gasps] Oh, my goodness! I flashed the entire set. Sorry, guys. I'm not used to wearing miniskirts on the show—I'm used to wearing baggy pants!.'" Though the change in wardrobe was a different feel, Hendrickson welcomed the new look. "I used to get a little frustrated with what I wore as Frankie; I was sick of looking like a rugrat," she stated. "But now, I really like my wardrobe. I'm excited that Maggie wears skirts all the time!"

In addition to feminine personality and wardrobe, the series characterized Maggie as extremely loyal and the ultimate friend. Her sense of humor is brought together by witty one-liners, often relying on such when angry, confrontational, or happy. Somewhat of a risk-taker, the character is frequently known to handle matters her way, no matter the consequence.

=== Sexuality ===
Throughout Maggie's years on the series, the writers kept her sexual orientation ambiguous in nature; she was first detailed as heterosexual, and the executive producers insisted that the character was not gay. Although stern in their insistence, it did not stop viewers from speculating the character's sexuality. Subsequently, the media began to speculate on the matter as well. One query about the topic was the likelihood of identical twins sharing a homosexual orientation. Magazine Soaps in Depth asked the question of Van Cagle, a Director Of Research for GLAAD (Gay & Lesbian Alliance Against Defamation). "There is scant research on this [subject]," said Cagle. He cited a 1991 study by Northwestern University professor Michael Bailey that found among female identical twins, one gay twin raised the likelihood of the other being gay to 48 percent, compared to fraternal twins, whose likelihood was only 12 percent. Cagle noted that despite this, "that study has never been replicated, and research is usually only valid if it is replicated and produces similar results."

Bianca's best friend, Maggie's relationship with Bianca was to be strictly platonic. This began to change when viewers cited overwhelming chemistry between the characters' portrayers, Riegel and Hendrickson, and demanded that the show pair Bianca and Maggie romantically. Subtle hints started to appear in the series suggesting Maggie might not be as heterosexual as she claimed, such as her leaving a white rose on Bianca's desk the day she is to go on a date with character Tim Dillon, even insisting on spending more time with Bianca while on the date. In a confrontational episode where a sexually frustrated Bianca finally asks Maggie to define what they are to each other, Maggie, after some avoidance, states that, romantically, she is "into guys" and only guys. The scenes became some of the most debated in the show's history; fans were angry, frustrated, and saddened by the series' refusal to pursue a Bianca and Maggie romance. Riegel and Hendrickson received praise for their performances in the scenes, and Maggie was seen moving on with new male character Henry Chin. Hendrickson stated her dissatisfaction with Maggie becoming romantically involved with a man so quickly after declaring her heterosexuality. She said that it was only a week after Maggie's confrontation with Bianca.

Within the series, Maggie's relationship with Henry soon ends, but the character is not heavily romantically linked with any other man for months and Maggie's relationship with Bianca continues to deepen. Hendrickson was perplexed by this aspect. "Maggie was asexual for a long time. It was frustrating, and I was getting confused how I should play it," said Hendrickson. "So I kept it honest: She loved Bianca as a friend. There was a possibility that she could love her more intimately. She still does love her, and there was a point in time when she might have thought otherwise. But ultimately she likes men." Despite Hendrickson's early views about the character's sexual orientation, the show continued to showcase Maggie sending "mixed signals" to Bianca, with her romantic feelings for Bianca coming through as intense. The character is shown to resort to having sex with good guy and best friend Jamie Martin on several occasions to bury these feelings, though most of her sexual interaction with Jamie takes place offscreen. Maggie's romantic attraction to Bianca finally gets the better of her, and she impulsively kisses her. Maggie panics, however, and tells Bianca it meant nothing. Heartbroken, she finds comfort in Jamie.

Jamie and Reggie Montgomery were written as Maggie's two closest male friends, and "voices of reason" to Maggie's love life. Within the story, they urge Maggie to accept the reality of her feelings for Bianca. In one scene, Jamie tells a surprised Maggie that he knows what she and Bianca have going on is "far more" than friendship, and that everyone can see it. He tells her that when it comes to his romantic life, he wishes that someone loved him as deeply as she loves Bianca. Reggie often says that Bianca and Maggie have a "forever love."

Maggie eventually accepts her sexual attraction to Bianca. Alone with Bianca on a sofa in her apartment, she confesses to being in love with her. Like Bianca and Maggie's confrontational scenes over Maggie's sexual orientation, these scenes were praised by fans and critics as well.

Despite Bianca's surprise, she graciously calmed Maggie following the big reveal. Miss Stone, however, now had to confront the truth about her sexuality. 'Did I just come out?' she asked Bianca. Hendrickson may have started off as a woman afraid to admit her true feelings, but she easily transitioned into one of confusion as her alter ego struggled to face the situation. 'Am I gay, or is it just you? Am I a straight girl who has a crush on a gay friend? Or am I gay and sleeping with guys to prove that I'm not?' As she rattled off these questions, Hendrickson gave us reason to want to help her find the answers. There may not have been any immediate resolution by Maggie coming clean, but Hendrickson provided a new depth to the character when she did so, especially after all was said and done. While thanking Bianca for the shoulder to lean on, Hendrickson was about to hug her like Maggie always does. But given what had transpired, she hesitated, unsure if she should. It was a small incident, but it meant a whole lot, and left us wanting more of Maggie—and the actress who plays her.

— Soaps In Depth

Hendrickson stated following Maggie's coming out, she feared viewers would no longer care about Maggie's struggle to understand her unfolding sexual identity. In response to this, a soap opera columnist assured, "Not only do we still care, we care more than ever."

At the time, Bianca is in a romance with newcomer Lena Kundera. She declares her commitment to Lena, and Maggie is left feeling rejected. Maggie's next romance is with character Jonathan Lavery, a relationship brought on by her hurt feelings, as well as feeling second best to Bianca's other best friend, Babe Carey (Maggie's cousin once removed). Maggie and Jonathan's romance was new territory for Hendrickson, as her character's sexual activity increased:

Because I play a sexually confused character, I have not had to do a lot of sex scenes (giggles). Maggie lost her virginity to Henry in her dorm room, and it was PC, pretty chaste. Well, not with Jonathan! When we did our first big love scene, I was so surprised about how prudish and shy I became! It's like I became 16 again. I had to drop the blanket that was covering me, and in the middle of my kiss with Jeff Branson, Jonathan], I started cracking up. He was like, 'What did I do, what did I do?' And I was like, 'Nothing! It wasn't you! I'm a 25-year-old professional woman. What is wrong with me?' I couldn't believe myself!' Everyone else does these scenes all the time, they're basically naked and it's no big deal, and I'm like, 'I need everyone to leave the set!' I'm a prude!

Hendrickson considered Bianca and Maggie to be truly in love. "They're soul mates," she said. "They have an emotional bond that is stronger than Maggie has ever had with anyone." Maggie eventually grasps her sexuality months after jetting off to Paris, the location the writers scripted Bianca and Maggie to have become lovers, offscreen. Two years later, Hendrickson was relieved when Maggie's previous sexual confusion was revealed to be over.

== Storylines ==
Maggie is the twin sister of Frankie, who had previously been in love with Bianca, comes to Pine Valley and soon solves the murder mystery; regarding her sister's death. She is held captive by her aunt, Vanessa Cortlandt (also known as drug lord Proteus) after she reveals to Vanessa that she knows Vanessa played a part in Frankie's death. Maggie's cousins, David Hayward and Leo du Pres, save her, and Vanessa is later captured and sent to jail. Maggie, with hardly any family, views David and Leo more as her brothers than as her cousins. They form a close relationship, bonding over their battles with Vanessa. Maggie easily bonds with Bianca as well due to the connection that the two shared with Frankie. They become best friends.

When Bianca realizes that she has increasing romantic feelings for Maggie, she fears it is because Maggie has the same face and body as Frankie. She pushes Maggie into a relationship with Tim Dillon to help her get over the young woman. However, Maggie ignores Tim, even while on a date with him and insists on being closer to Bianca. Bianca's forcefulness of pushing Tim and Maggie together does not work out. She later confronts Maggie to define whether or not she and Maggie are lovers in the making. Maggie says that she loves Bianca, but stresses that she is not in love with her.

I feel that Maggie is coming alive, finally. For a while [she's] been in sort of a rut; I feel like [she] got a little boring. [ Megan ] definitely threw some spice and life into my character, which is so refreshing. I even see a difference in her language and dialogue; she's really speaking like a young woman. She's becoming more three-dimensional.

— Hendrickson on her character's emergence of depth

Soon after, tragedy abounds when Leo and Vanessa are reported to have died after falling over waterfall Miller's Falls. Maggie, along with Trey Kenyon (another long-lost cousin) is there as a great support to Leo's wife, Greenlee Smythe. Maggie also helps David and Anna Devane after the loss of their baby, Leora. Closer to Maggie than ever, David offers to pay for Maggie's tuition at Pine Valley University (PVU) after she declares her interest in Med School. During this time, Maggie sees David as a father-figure to her and Anna as a mother.

When Maggie's boyfriend, Henry Chin cheats on an exam, Maggie is almost expelled from school for letting him look off of her paper. She tries to help him in any way she can. He is the first guy she has romantic feelings for. Henry, not wanting Maggie to suffer for his bad actions any longer, confesses to higher authority. Maggie is permitted to stay at PVU and helps Henry pursue his music career. She says goodbye to him when his group goes on tour. Maggie soon learns that Michael Cambias has recently raped Bianca. She is the first one Bianca tells of this and encourages Bianca to let David examine her. Bianca refuses, saying that she is fine. However, the truth comes out later and Maggie holds Bianca's hand through the whole rape exam. She is Bianca's entire emotional support and their bond deepens. When Bianca again pursues her ex-girlfriend Lena Kundera, Maggie shows signs of jealousy. Though having been sexually intimate with Jamie Martin, she agrees to help him make Babe Carey Chandler (the object of Jamie's affections) jealous if he keeps up the ruse that he is Maggie's boyfriend. This also serves to hide Maggie's romantic feelings for Bianca.

Lena later leaves town to care for her ailing mother and Bianca turns to Maggie once again for emotional support. The need for Maggie in her life is just as intense this time around, since Bianca lost her child, Miranda, the daughter that resulted from Michael's rape of her. Maggie offers Bianca her home as a place to stay, a new apartment that she shares with Jamie. During a game of "i never", Maggie lets out an issue that has been on her mind - her romantic feelings for Bianca. She professes her love to Bianca, but Bianca rejects her, saying that she is still very much in love with Lena. Not long after, Jamie is arrested for drugging Babe, but Maggie is certain of his innocence. She joins forces with Reggie Montgomery and Danielle Frye to find the real culprit. Her suspicions are directed toward JR Chandler, who was at their apartment the night before drugs were found incriminating Jamie of the crime. Bianca, close friends with JR, does not believe in his guilt and asks Maggie to trust him. Bianca says that JR would not do that to his wife or brother. Maggie becomes further frustrated with the situation.

After feeling jilted by Bianca a second time in what she believes to be Bianca having chosen Babe as a lover, she enters into a romantic relationship with bad boy Jonathan Lavery. Maggie, unaware when finding Bianca in bed with Babe earlier that it was a ploy to trap JR into confessing that he framed Jamie, wraps herself deeply into Jonathan's life. It is not long before Jamie goes on the run with Babe, leaving Maggie without a roommate. She has Jonathan move in with her. Everything goes well with Jonathan at first, their relationship seeming to be more about sex in the beginning. Jonathan is even aware of Maggie's sexual confusion and asks her how she could have ever thought she was gay. Maggie says she was wrong. Although Bianca and Maggie share a second kiss together, Maggie stresses to Bianca that she is not a lesbian. Things begin to fall apart for Jonathan and Maggie's romance when she finds him destroying the shirt Bianca wore the night Miranda was born. Jonathan convinces Maggie that the shirt would have provided the evidence needed to prove that the Cambias heir, Ethan, is really a Cambias, and would have resulted in Jonathan's brother, the current heir to the Cambias fortune, Ryan, to lose everything. Maggie covers for him with Bianca.

The couple appears to want the same thing, but Jonathan soon reveals his dark side. The shirt was the last keepsake Bianca had of Miranda. However, Bianca is given a miracle when Miranda turns out alive. Maggie is elated, but Jonathan is disturbed by it all. When Bianca is at the brink of death after a fall from a deck due to a scuffle with JR, Jonathan, who is aware of the incident, does not tell Maggie. During a heated argument with him about it, after she discovers his deception, Jonathan loses his calm and slaps her. Maggie stays quiet about the physical altercation, and claims that the bruise on her face is due to a gym accident. The slap by Jonathan is only the beginning of his abuse of her.

We just adore each other so much. And Jeff is not at all like his evil counterpart, Jonathan, who was abusive to Maggie. He hated saying some things to me because he has such a wonderful and beautiful heart. Sometimes we would finish scenes and we would just look at each other and be like "Aww, I don't like when you do that."

— Hendrickson

Jonathan begins to verbally abuse Maggie, making comments about her sexuality and relationship with Bianca. Maggie finally takes control of the situation when she learns that Jonathan has been terrorizing Bianca. Bianca helps Maggie see that Jonathan is an abuser. Maggie refuses her help at first; she says Jonathan loves her and she loves Jonathan. She eventually breaks off her relationship with him.

Bianca is set to leave Pine Valley in February 2005, for a fresh start. She offers Maggie to come along for a new beginning. Maggie considers the offer and refuses. But an unexpected fog blanket keeps Bianca's plane grounded long enough for Maggie to reconsider. On a whim, she joins Bianca and Miranda as they embark on their new life together. She acknowledges her romantic feelings for Bianca, but wants to take the build-up to romance with Bianca slowly. Maggie joins Bianca and Miranda and moves to Paris, as friends, where she begins to take medical classes. While in Paris, Maggie and Bianca become lovers, as revealed by Bianca in her Christmas 2005 visit to Pine Valley.

Maggie chooses to remain in Paris to continue her medical studies, while Bianca and Miranda return to Pine Valley so that Bianca can meet her new older half-brother, Josh Madden. After returning to Pine Valley, Bianca reveals to her brother that Maggie has cheated on her and that the two have broken up. Bianca tells her sister, Kendall Hart Slater, that she should have stayed in Paris and fought for Maggie, that Maggie is the woman she is in love with and she never should have come home.

== Writing and continuation conflicts ==
Following Hendrickson's February 2007 departure from the series, unconfirmed reports circulated that Maggie would return in the near future: "Ms. Stone's ambiguous exit leaves viewers wondering whether she'll return, yet an AMC rep says nothing is planned at this time," relayed an article.

Viewers witnessed Bianca deciding to move back to Paris, where she would help Zoe through transition as a friend while Zoe lived in London. Not long afterwards, however, the characters were revealed to have drifted apart. The series left it so that it was possible that Bianca and Maggie could have renewed their relationship while back in Paris, but on September 18, 2008, Bianca's return to the series was announced; she would be without Maggie, due to Hendrickson currently being with the cast of The Young and the Restless. Bianca was instead given a new female lover, Reese Williams, portrayed by Tamara Braun. In 2010, Riegel permanently left the role of Bianca and joined Hendrickson on The Young and the Restless.

== See also ==
- Bianca Montgomery and Maggie Stone
- Supercouple
