= Ryan Lavery =

- All My Children character
- Portrayed by: Cameron Mathison
- Duration: 1998–2011
- First appearance: January 12, 1998
- Last appearance: September 23, 2011
- Created by: Megan McTavish
- Introduced by: Francesca James
In-universe information
- Other names: Ryan Aloyious Lavery; John Ryan Curry
- Occupation: Co-Founder of the Myrtle Fargate Foundation (2011–); Co-Owner and CEO of Cambias Industries (2011–); Owner of The Seasons Casinos (2010–); Con-artist
- Parents: Patrick Lavery; Gail Curry Lavery
- Siblings: Braden Lavery; Jonathan Lavery; Erin Lavery
- Spouse: Gillian Andrassy (1998–1999, 2001); Greenlee Smythe du'Pres (2004–2007, 2011–); Annie Novak McDermott (2007–2009)
- Children: Emma Lavery; Spike Lavery; Sara Lavery
- Other relatives: Duke Lavery (Note: On the January 25, 2002 episode of All My Children, Anna Devane stated that Duke and Gail were first cousins. However, on the July 19, 2004 episode, the story was retconned making Patrick and Duke first cousins, instead of Duke and Gail.)

Ryan Lavery is a fictional character from the American daytime drama All My Children, as portrayed by Cameron Mathison from 1998 to 2002 and from 2003 to 2011. He has a daughter with ex-wife Annie Lavery, a son with Kendall Hart, and is married to Kendall's best friend and sometimes enemy Greenlee Smythe.

== Background ==
=== Casting ===
In January 1998, Cameron Mathison debuted on All My Children as con man Ryan Lavery. He remained with the series until 2002 when the actor decided to leave the series. In 2003, Mathison returned. At the time, the actor was already considering rejoining the show, but news of Megan McTavish's return as head writer convinced him. "I worked really well with [McTavish] and she obviously knows the character – she created him!" Mathison said.

In 2009, All My Children's production moved from New York to Los Angeles. Mathison debated whether or not to move his family to California in order to continue working on the show. "At ABC and All My Children, I'm a real family member", he said. "But at the same time, I didn't want to feel like, "Without a question, I have to drag myself across the country for this show". After planning out how they could viably stay in New York without All My Children, he and his wife, Vanessa, decided to move with the show. In 2011, ABC Daytime President Brian Frons announced the cancellation of All My Children and One Life to Live. The production company Prospect Park planned to pick up the soap operas and air them online. Mathison and Lindsay Hartley (Dr. Cara Castillo) were the first actors from the show to join the new production. In November 2011, Prospect Park called off plans to produce the soap operas online.

== Storylines ==
Ryan Lavery arrives in Pine Valley in January 1998 as a con man seeking riches. After getting hired at WRCW, he begins a scheme involving kickback funds. When station manager Liza Colby discovers this, she threatens Ryan with jail time. She says that she will send him to jail unless he marries Gillian Andrassy, who is about to be wed to her nephew, Scott. Ryan and Gillian go through many ups and downs, but eventually fall deeply in love. However, their romance ends in tragedy, when a hit man takes Gillian's life while trying to kill Anna Devane.

After the death of his wife, Ryan spins out of control, causing him to drink often and take more risks. He begins to come in "contact" with Gillian via psychic Opal Cortlandt. He is unsuccessful at trying to make Opal contact Gillian from the great beyond. In despair, he goes to his and Gillian's special place, the Wildwind turret, holding a candlelight vigil for Gillian, but accidentally sets the turret on fire and is knocked out in the process. Gillian appears to Ryan as a spirit, which revives him and he manages to escape. He is found later by his long-time friend Liza and the two make love out of their shared grief, causing her to become pregnant, which infuriates Adam Chandler. Ryan meets Mia Saunders during a card game and immediately becomes involved with her. They grow closer when Mia relays to him that she and Liza are sisters and that she never knew her father. Ryan and Mia's relationship does not last, however. They drift apart.

A ghostly Gillian orchestrates Ryan to meet Chris Stamp, who is new in town, when Ryan's mother dies (off-camera). Adam investigates Ryan's past, discovering that Ryan's father is a drug dealer. Ryan to leave town, but stays when he feels that he should learn more about his family's history. Liza falls down some steps and loses Ryan's baby. Ryan blames Adam for "killing" his baby. Adding to the drama, Chris tells Ryan that he killed his father a long time ago. Ryan does not trust Chris, though, and tries to keep his distance from him.

=== Kendall ===
He meets Kendall Hart for the first time at the Pine Cone Motel. They argue all of the time, but somehow seem to be there for each other during difficult moments. Ryan saves Kendall from a burning room and resuscitates her. This is the start of something more between them, as two lost souls. They enter into a romantic relationship, often bickering but loving each other deeply.

Ryan manages to acquire a disc with information about drug lord Proteus (who has been terrorizing the citizens of Pine Valley). He hides it inside of a doll that belonged to Kendall. When Kendall discovers this, she blackmails Ryan, but he later retrieves it. In a shooting over the Proteus disk, Chris takes a bullet for Ryan and Ryan learns that he is Chris's biological son. The revelation causes Ryan to wonder if this is the reason his stepfather beat him, because he knew the truth. Ryan slowly builds a relationship with Chris.

Ryan and Kendall's relationship deepens. Wanting to see Kendall happy, he tries to bring about a warmer mother-daughter relationship between Kendall and Erica Kane while he builds on his father-son bond with Chris. Erica is Kendall's mother and the two have a rocky relationship and history.

What Ryan and Kendall have is a serious connection. It was there before; it will be there tomorrow. It's there when they're fighting, it's there when they're happy. It's always there. I think that's the big difference between what Ryan and Kendall have and what Zach and Kendall have. Zach and Kendall have something incredible, but it's not a connection that Ryan and Kendall have. And I'm not talking about a love connection.

What Ryan and Kendall have is a serious connection. It was there before; it will be there tomorrow. It's there when they're fighting, it's there when they're happy. It's always there. I think that's the big difference between what Ryan and Kendall have and what Zach and Kendall have. Zach and Kendall have something incredible, but it's not a connection that Ryan and Kendall have. And I'm not talking about a love connection.

— Cameron Mathison.

Ryan remains committed to Kendall, despite her feelings of inadequacy. Ryan and Kendall plan to leave Pine Valley together, but their plans are halted when Kendall is framed for burning down Erica's house due to seemingly circumstantial evidence. Ryan and Kendall declare that they are deeply in love with each other, and Ryan defends Kendall to the whole town. Trey Kenyon, Kendall's lawyer in the arson case, suggests that Kendall take a lie detector test to prove her innocence (it is later discovered Trey is the actual arsonist and is framing Kendall for setting fire to her own mother's house. Upon this revelation in fall 2002, Trey is arrested and imprisoned for burning down Erica's house). Against Ryan's better judgment, Kendall takes the test and fails. Ryan believes Kendall is not telling the whole truth about the night of the fire, but despite her dishonesty, he proposes marriage to her at her grandmother's gravesite.

Before their wedding day in the summer of 2002, however, Ryan walks in on Kendall in a compromising position with Aidan Devane while, in actuality, Kendall was searching for proof that she is being framed for burning down her mother's house. Unaware of this, Ryan believes Kendall has cheated on him with Aidan. Extremely hurt, and this being one of many hits to his well-being, he decides to leave town. On his motorcycle, he looks back at a crying Kendall screaming after him. It is too late for them, he has decided and drives off, leaving Kendall to helplessly run after him in the middle of the night before giving up in despair. Meanwhile, Erica learns evidence of Kendall's innocence and uses it to clear her daughter of her arson charge.

In August 2003, Ryan shows up in the Nevada desert. He meets Alexander Cambias Sr., whose health is rapidly deteriorating. On his deathbed, Alexander leaves Ryan the Cambias fortune when he finds out that Michael Cambias raped Bianca Montgomery. He leaves the fortune with the simple stipulation that only if Alex has no living heir other than Michael, Ryan will receive the money. Ryan returns to Pine Valley and keeps his presence a secret from his old friends, with the exception of Edmund Grey. He soon reveals to the entire town that Alexander Cambias has left him in control of the entire Cambias fortune.

The announcement immediately causes conflict between Ryan and ex-fiancée Kendall, who claims to be married to Michael and thus the true owner of Cambias Industries. Michael's dead body shows up soon after. Even with these fights, the attraction between Ryan and Kendall is still there, and they have a night of passion together. After Michael's time of death negates Kendall's claim to the Cambias fortune, Ryan finds Kendall's sister, Bianca, holding a sonogram. He assumes that she is pregnant, but is shocked when Kendall snatches the sonogram and claims the baby is hers. Ryan refuses to believe the claim. He demands that a DNA test be taken to confirm what she says. Kendall passes the test, but Ryan puts various pieces of the past few months together and silently realizes that Kendall is not pregnant. He knows that she is claiming to be in order to help pregnant Bianca, who is actually carrying Michael's child. Ryan tells Kendall that he is dropping any suit against her that fought her pregnancy claim. He posts her bail when she is arrested for Michael's murder.

=== Triangle with Kendall and Greenlee ===
Kendall and Erica grow close again but Kendall continues to have trust issues. Despite her insecurities, she and Ryan reunite romantically, in what they feel is for good this time. He surprises her with a pouch that will make her appear pregnant. The two become engaged and plan to marry as soon as Kendall is cleared of murder charges. Ryan's friendship with Greenlee Smythe, however, eats away at what little security Kendall has. Her anger with Greenlee is intensified when Greenlee rips off her dress in court, revealing a fake pregnancy. Kendall believes that Ryan has allied himself with Greenlee and wants her to go to prison. Hurt by her lack of faith in him, a furious Ryan breaks things off with her. Ryan finds it difficult to be with Kendall when she does not fully trust him. No matter his anger at Greenlee's courtroom antics, he sees how truly remorseful she is and the two build a deeper friendship, much to the dismay of Kendall.

Bianca goes public with her pregnancy, and Ryan signs over the company to Bianca and her unborn daughter. Ryan is a great support for Kendall when Bianca's baby, Miranda, is presumed dead after a helicopter crash. Ryan helps Kendall cope with the traumatic loss, and the two grow closer. He is once again prepared to build a future with Kendall. But his friendship with Greenlee continues to upset her. Eventually, on Christmas 2004, it is discovered that Miranda was in fact switched with the son of JR Chandler and Babe Carey, the latter of whom was born at the same time as Miranda and given to Kelly Cramer of Llanview, while Bianca was falsely told that Miranda was dead. When the truth comes out to everyone, Miranda is forcibly taken away from a distraught JR and returned to Bianca's care.

In her efforts to keep Greenlee from being any part of Fusion Cosmetics (the company Greenlee started with Kendall), Kendall makes an announcement at a Cambias Industries board meeting: While Bianca was in control of the company (it reverted to Ryan after Miranda's apparent death), Kendall had a clause inserted that bars Greenlee from ever working at any Cambias owned company, including Fusion. Ryan views these actions taken by Kendall as wrong and asks her to stop feuding with Greenlee, to instead focus on his love for her. But Kendall finds that she cannot let go of her animosity toward the woman. Furious, Ryan again breaks off his romance with Kendall. He proposes to Greenlee and says, as his wife, she will be co-owner of Cambias and can work at Fusion or any other Cambias company. Ryan vows that their marriage will be platonic. Trusting Ryan, Greenlee agrees.

In May 2004, the two prepare to marry. But at the ceremony, Kendall arrives in place of Greenlee and professes her love to Ryan. She relays to Ryan that Greenlee approved the union and stepped back. Ryan is emotional, but when Greenlee appears and reveals that Kendall locked her in her hotel room to sabotage the wedding, his frustration is evident. Kendall and Greenlee fight, falling into a pool of water, as they duke it out. Ryan jumps into the pool after them and breaks up the fight. Ryan, let down that Kendall once again chose anger over their love, marries Greenlee.

=== Life with Greenlee ===
To make sure that their marriage appears valid, Ryan and Greenlee move in together to make it look like they're happy newlyweds. They grow close and the marriage of convenience becomes very convenient once Ryan discovers he loves his wife and Greenlee discovers that she loves him. The happy couple comes under attack when demons from his past, in the form of his troubled brother, Jonathan, come to town. Sometime after Chris's death, his journal is found which reveals that Chris was not Ryan's biological father after all. All the troubles with Jonathan lead Ryan into a downward spiral, sending him into fight clubs and making him believe he should not be a father. Greenlee wants to prove him wrong by getting pregnant. Ryan fakes his own death in an effort to protect his wife and child from him. When he comes back, he discovers his wife has lost their baby and that Kendall is now acting as their surrogate; Greenlee having used his sperm donation to a clinic while he was presumed dead. Angry that he faked his death, Greenlee refuses to reunite with him no matter how much he wants to be with her. Soon, it is revealed that the baby Kendall is pregnant with is actually her own baby with Ryan, not Greenlee's. Devastated by what she perceives as her friend's betrayal, Greenlee leaves town.

=== Annie and amnesia ===
After Greenlee leaves town, Ryan has a difficult time coping without her. In June 2006, Kendall gives birth to their son and names him Spike. At this point, Ryan believes he is in love with Kendall. However, he is unable to break up her happy marriage with Zach.

Ryan forms a close bond with Annie McDermott. Their bond becomes stronger after Erin Lavery (Ryan's sister) is killed; Ryan and Annie fall in love. In March 2007, Ryan learns that Annie's daughter, Emma, is really his daughter via sperm donation and he asks Annie to marry him.

Greenlee returns to town right after Ryan's wedding to Annie hoping for another romantic relationship with him. She announces she never signed her divorce papers and she and Ryan are still married, thus invalidating his marriage to Annie. Ryan is furious with Greenlee. After a quick divorce, he remarries Annie. Greenlee at first wants his son in her custody, believing that he should have been hers, but later drops the custody suit she pulled on Ryan and Kendall. Eventually, Greenlee attempts to kidnap Spike, but when she has a change of heart and attempts to return the baby, she gets in a car accident that appears to leave Spike deaf.

Though Ryan is eventually able to forgive a remorseful Greenlee, the ever-vindictive Kendall becomes obsessed with making Greenlee pay and plots for months to make it appear that Greenlee has attempted to kidnap Spike again. Though she succeeds, Kendall's plan goes terribly wrong when Greenlee goes on the run with Aidan and ultimately goes missing for weeks along with Zach Slater, Kendall's husband. After taking Spike to get Cochlear implant surgery to restore his hearing, Kendall is horrified and guilt-ridden when Dr. Joe Martin reveals to her and Ryan that Spike's hearing loss was in fact caused by a chromosomal abnormality and that it was purely coincidental that the abnormality manifested itself at the time of the car accident. At Christmas 2007, Zach and Greenlee are found near-death and rescued. Despite everyone's opposition to the idea, Kendall testifies in court to the set-up and to the truth behind Spike's deafness, and Greenlee's testimony convinces the judge to let Kendall off on probation and with community service.

Ryan is shot in the head while protecting Kendall from Zach's ex-lover Hannah Nichols, but manages to survive. However, his behavior becomes erratic and unusual.

On February 1, 2008, he loses his memory, exactly four years of his life, thinking it is still 2004. He has forgotten about his marriage to Annie and his kids, Emma and Spike. He believes himself to be still engaged to Kendall and is lost when he discovers he has dissociative amnesia. He is in love with her, but there is one problem; she is now married to Zach. Ryan believes that Zach has stolen his entire life, because Zach is now owner of Cambias Industries, a title that was given to Ryan by Alexander Cambias Sr. when he was believed to be dead, and due to Ryan's son considering Zach to also be his father.

Some time after much upheaval of Ryan struggling to remember pieces of his life, especially his life with Annie, Greenlee has a sailboating accident when the sail hits her head. Ryan witnesses Greenlee getting hit and rescues her. Her accident makes her realize how much she wants her relationship with Aidan Devane to work. But when Ryan rescues Greenlee from her sailboat accident, the last four years of his life come rushing back to him. He fights his reawakened feelings of being in love with Greenlee as he watches how happy she and Aidan are together.

=== Back to Greenlee ===
Annie grows angry and hurt when she realizes that Ryan still loves Greenlee. She starts to scheme to keep Ryan around. She even gets pregnant, but Annie loses this baby when Kendall confronts her about her scheming. Annie later confesses to Ryan for doing some of the things Kendall mentioned (everything but killing Richie Novak, her brother) and tells him how sorry she is but that she does not expect him to forgive her. She asks Ryan to leave. Ryan, devastated and terribly hurt, leaves the hospital room. He receives comfort from his friends, especially Greenlee. He has Annie committed to Oak Haven after finding out that she murdered Richie and after she stabbed Erica Kane. He wants to be there for his daughter but also shows interest in helping Annie get better. However, he cannot deny his feelings for Greenlee any longer and asks her to marry him on December 30, 2008.

On January 27, 2009, Amanda goes to Ryan and Greenlee because she wants them to have her baby after she gives birth to the boy or girl. Amanda later changes her mind about wanting to give the baby up. Ryan and Greenlee plan to have their wedding on the same day as Reese and Bianca. On their wedding day, however, Ryan cancels the wedding after having seen Zach and Reese kiss the night before. He tells Greenlee that he knows Zach and Reese have been sleeping together and that he does not want to be married next to them, but promises her that he will give her the wedding of her dreams. Greenlee then tries to get in touch with Zach; she wants to know if he has really been having an affair with Reese. When Greenlee cannot get in touch with Zach, she drives off on her motorcycle in search of him. Also on the road are Zach and Kendall in a car arguing. Kendall ends up in the wrong lane and nearly hits Greenlee. Both try to swerve out of the other's way, leaving Greenlee to drive off the road. When Greenlee's body is not found, she is presumed dead.

Ryan and Kendall travel to identify Greenlee's body. They see her engagement ring and assume it is her. Afterwards, they engage in grief sex. Ryan feels bad afterwards because he feels like he betrayed Greenlee. Jack gives him a videotape that Greenlee wanted him to see in case something ever happened to her. In the video, she says that she wants him to be happy, whether it is with her or not.

Several months later, Ryan receives a champagne flute from Greenlee. After drawing several conclusions and taking into account that no one ever actually identified the body, he comes to believe that Greenlee is still alive.

On June 16, 2009, Ryan receives an early Christmas gift: two glasses with a marriage proposal on one and the acceptance on the other; Ryan assumes they came from Jack. He also receives a strange phone call from someone, but someone else on the other line prevents the caller from talking to Ryan.

Ryan tries to protect Kendall from being called Stuart's murderer. He blames Annie for being the murderer without any hard evidence against Annie. Ryan, Zach, Erica and Aidan try to protect Kendall because they do not think that she is the murderer. They think Annie is the murderer because, to them, she's a psycho. It is eventually discovered that Kendall didn't kill Stuart, but he was in fact shot by Adam while he was in a drugged state. When Adam confesses, Kendall is cleared of all charges while Adam is not charged due to double jeopardy.

In November 2009, Ryan discovers Greenlee's medical records on David's computer, who claims he was using them for research into Amanda Dillon's pregnancy. It is later revealed that David has been keeping Greenlee in Massachusetts while she recovers.

When Greenlee comes back to Pine Valley she plans a surprise for her and Ryan, but she gets a surprise when she goes to Ryan's house and sees him having sex with Erica Kane. She becomes very angry and is planning to hurt Ryan as much as he hurt her. To do this she comes up with the plan to marry David Hayward on Valentine's Day which was the day she died and was supposed to marry Ryan. When Ryan finds out she's alive he is shocked and is ready to do anything to get her back, even kidnapping her. Ryan and Jake take Greenlee to the castle where they were first married but she becomes enraged and his plan backfires. Ryan agrees to back off Greenlee.

Greenlee does not know the truth about the night of her accident and she is angry that everyone is lying to her, so she snoops around Erica's office and finds where Kendall and Zach are. She knows that Kendall won't lie to her so she flies to Spain and asks Kendall what really happened. Kendall tells her that she was the one that was driving the car that almost killed her. Greenlee is very angry when she hears this and accuses Kendall of trying to kill her so she can be with Ryan.

Greenlee testifies at David's trial and tells the court that Kendall was driving the car that drove her off the road. Disgusted with her actions, Ryan tells her that she succeeded with killing whatever feelings that they had left. Greenlee is very upset about this but refuses to admit it, so she sleeps with David to prove that she doesn't love Ryan.

=== Madison North ===
Meanwhile, Ryan finds out Madison North, Greenlee's assistant at Fusion, got a job at the casino as a waitress to help pay her rent. Madison does not tell Greenlee about this, and Ryan helps her keep it a secret. Greenlee finds out and eventually fires Madison, but Ryan lets her keep her job at the casino. In the process, they grow closer. They decide to go on a date, but Ryan backs out to help Greenlee. Later, he comes back and apologizes to Madison, asking for a second chance. She agrees and they go on a date. Despite this, Ryan still has feelings for Greenlee.

When Madison and Ryan go on a business trip together, Greenlee shows up unexpectedly after her father reminds her of how happy she was with Ryan. She leaves without telling them why she came. When Ryan tries to help Greenlee, he goes to the park to meet her on July 22, 2010, and encounters David, who wants Ryan to stay away from Greenlee. While exchanging heated words, Ryan collapses just as Greenlee arrives at the park. At the hospital, Ryan is diagnosed with an aneurysm as a result of being shot. He recuperates with Madison, Emma and Greenlee by his side.

Greenlee realizes how much she loves Ryan after this incident and tells David she wants a divorce. However, David blackmails her into staying with him by doctoring evidence that frames Greenlee as responsible for Erica's plane crash. When she tries to tell Ryan, David purposely scares her by having an officer pick her up and take her to the station. Ryan later realizes something is wrong and has Jake Martin help him feign a relapse so Greenlee will tell him the truth. In the process, Kendall, who had left Pine Valley with Zach and her sons, returns, and Ryan asks her to help Greenlee out.

When Greenlee visits Ryan while he's feigning a relapse on August 12, 2010, she confesses the truth and he wakes up, telling her that he knows something was wrong. Ryan tells Greenlee to let him help her this once. Greenlee agrees, and they begin secretly plotting to take David down for his blackmail. Madison becomes upset about the time Ryan spends with Greenlee, and Ryan tries his best to assure her, despite still having feelings for Greenlee.

Ryan and Greenlee suspect that Liza, David's new lawyer, has the evidence linking Greenlee to the plane crash. Ryan tries to steal the evidence, but gets caught. On September 3, 2010, during a party hosted by Caleb Cooney, Ryan and David got into an altercation. David later drops dead in the middle of the party. Kendall finds Ryan near David's room with no recollection of how he got there. Ryan later turns himself in for David's murder and bargains with Liza Colby.

On September 13, the autopsy revealed that David died from a high dosage of Digitalis, clearing Ryan's name. Ryan, desperate for answers, hires a hypnotherapist on September 17, 2010, to help him. Greenlee, worried about what he will reveal, uses his phone to listen in on the session, and hears Ryan admit that he loves her.

=== Fresh start with Greenlee ===
While in California together, Ryan and Greenlee admit their love to each other on November 11, 2010. On November 18, 2010, while on his way to pick up Ryan and Greenlee, Zach's plane crashes into the ocean and Zach is presumed dead. When they return to Pine Valley, they discover that David Hayward is alive and well. When Greenlee is found guilty of his murder, he walks into the courtroom, shocking everyone. Once David reveals the truth about the night he was supposedly murdered, Greenlee is cleared of all charges and David himself is arrested. On November 29, 2010, David escapes and confronts Ryan on the roof of his house, intending to kill him and kidnap Greenlee. In the ensuing confrontation, David nearly throws Ryan off the roof before being shot in the back and rendered comatose by Kendall; however, Erica takes the blame to protect Kendall because the latter repressed her memories of the incident.

Greenlee and Ryan face much guilt over Zach's death because Zach was there because he was helping them, and their relationship with Kendall is strained because she also blames them, admitting to Ryan that she only tolerates his presence because they share a son and would want nothing to do with him otherwise. However, they reconcile at Christmas after Greenlee gets trapped in the elevator at Fusion and Kendall helps her.

Greenlee hacks into the hospital computer system and discovers that Madison North is pregnant with Ryan's child. She confronts Madison and demands to know what her plans are. Madison says she does not know yet and begs her not to tell Ryan. After Madison falls and passes out; Greenlee gets her and the baby to the hospital. Realizing Greenlee saved both of their lives, Madison accepts Greenlee's offer to start over in New York. However, after realizing that she has friends and people who genuinely care about her, she decides to reject the offer and stay in Pine Valley. Greenlee goes and makes a deal with Scott Chandler; she will get Scott a job if he befriends Madison. Greenlee is keeping this secret from Ryan.

On January 20, 2011, Ryan proposes to Greenlee and she happily accepts. Soon after, Ryan and Greenlee announce their engagement to Erica and Jack, and later Kendall.

Greenlee and Ryan have set their wedding date as February 14, 2011. They both have agreed to marry at Fusion Cosmetics. Before Ryan and Greenlee got married, Ryan learns that Madison is pregnant. During the reception Krystal and Jackson insist on getting picture and Greenlee asked Ryan's daughter Emma to get her makeup bag. Emma is last seen being led away by her mother Annie Chandler who has crashed the wedding. On March 11, 2011, Ryan learns that he is father of Madison's baby. On May 3, 2011, Ryan learns that Greenlee knew that Madison was pregnant since December and didn't tell him. On May 11, 2011, Ryan's daughter, Sara, was born but she later dies on May 19.
