= Bianca Montgomery =

- All My Children character
- Eden Riegel as Bianca Montgomery
- Portrayed by: Jessica Leigh Falborn (1988–1990); Caroline Wilde (1990–1991); Lacey Chabert (1992–1993); Gina Gallagher (1993–1997); Nathalie Paulding (1997–1998); Eden Riegel (2000–2010, 2013); Christina Bennett Lind (2010–2011)
- Duration: 1988–1998; 2000–2011; 2013
- First appearance: February 8, 1988
- Last appearance: July 15, 2013
- Created by: Lorraine Broderick
- Introduced by: Stephen Schenkel (1988); Jean Dadario Burke (2000); Ginger Smith (2013)
- Crossover appearances: One Life to Live
- Christina Bennett Lind as Bianca Montgomery
In-universe information
- Occupation: Head of Cambias Industries' European division; Co-owner (by proxy) of Cambias Industries; Founder of the Miranda Montgomery Center for Women and Children
- Family: Kane
- Parents: Travis Montgomery; Erica Kane
- Half-brothers: Josh Madden; Sean Montgomery
- Half-sisters: Kendall Hart; Molly Montgomery
- Wife: Reese Williams (2009–2011)
- Daughters: Miranda Montgomery; Gabrielle Montgomery
- Grandparents: Eric Kane; Mona Kane Tyler
- Aunts and uncles: Jackson Montgomery; Christine Montgomery; Mark Dalton; Silver Kane
- Nephews: Spike Lavery; Ian Slater
- First cousins: Greenlee Smythe; Reggie Montgomery (adoptive); Lily Montgomery (adoptive); Julie Rand Chandler

Bianca Montgomery is a fictional character from the American daytime drama All My Children. Until Eden Riegel assumed the role, portraying the character from July 2000 to January 2010, the character was portrayed solely by child actresses: Lacey Chabert, Nathalie Paulding, Gina Gallagher, Caroline Wilde and Jessica Leigh Falborn. When Riegel decided to permanently exit the role, plans to recast were confirmed; in June 2010, Christina Bennett Lind replaced Riegel, and remained on the series through the original television finale episode, which aired September 23, 2011. In February 2013, it was announced that Riegel would be reprising her role as Bianca in a guest-arc on Prospect Park's continuation of All My Children.

The character of Bianca is the daughter of Erica Kane and the late Travis Montgomery, born onscreen on February 8, 1988. Her birthday was revised to February 9, 1984 on January 31, 2002 by the show's producers, and her age was stated as 16 in 2000. The middle name given to the character is Christine, after her paternal aunt, Christine Montgomery, and she is portrayed as sweet-natured and well-loved in the fictional community of Pine Valley. Shown to suffer from Reye's syndrome in infancy, as well as anorexia nervosa later in life, she overcomes both with the significant aid of her family. Her most notable storyline is her coming out as a lesbian in 2000, a moment that has been seen as a milestone for LGBT representation in media.

Outside of fiction, Bianca has emerged as a gay icon within the LGBT community. Newspapers such as The New York Times cite her as the first lead character on a major daytime drama to be a lesbian, and The Advocate calls her "the most famous gay soap role of all time." She has been the subject and study of various academic works, said to have inspired soap opera writers to begin with the scripting of sexual identities of tortured teen characters, and is a heroine. Under Riegel's portrayal, her popularity has been cited as groundbreaking.

== Background ==
=== Casting and character creation ===
As a teenager, Eden Riegel gave up on her pursuit of a successful acting career. She stated that she had seen a "number of talented people" who were struggling, and that she started to doubt whether she would ever have the success that she wanted. She decided that it was time to major in social and political theory, go to law school, and become a lawyer. This changed while she attended Harvard. While there, she received "a call from a casting director who thought that the five-foot-six beauty should audition to become Erica Kane’s daughter." Later, the character would eventually be revealed to be a lesbian. Producers did not tell Riegel she would be portraying a lesbian until after she won the role. "I was surprised," she said.

All My Children creator Agnes Nixon cites that scripting Bianca as a lesbian was in part inspired by Chaz Bono's memoir Family Outing. Nixon explained the feelings she wanted expressed with the character's mother, Erica. She wanted to showcase the thought process and actions "most parents" have upon finding out that their child is gay: "I think the right word for Erica's reaction is denial," said Nixon. "I read Family Outing by Chastity Bono. Cher had loads of friends who were gay, but she wasn't able to deal with [Chastity's being gay]. In this prejudicial society in which we live, the first reaction from a parent usually is, 'What did I do wrong?'"

Nixon, well known for her socially relevant storylines, said that the makings for the Bianca story began in 1947; a college housemate "came out" to Nixon when Nixon was the same age Riegel had been in 2000. Nixon acknowledged that the show's original story featuring lesbian characters, which was broadcast in 1983, which lasted two months, did not work out as well at the time as she had hoped, and wanted to try again. "Now, in a soap, if you want to do a story about a social issue seriously, the character has to be really well integrated. Bianca's story is the result of that — with growth and maturity," she stated.

Riegel discussed Bianca's storyline with her sister, Tatiana. Tatiana, who is a lesbian and eighteen years Riegel's senior, became one of the primary people Riegel wanted to impress with the storyline. With Tatiana living in Los Angeles, where she works as a film editor and Riegel having lived on the East Coast most of her early life, the sisters did not grow up together but maintained a close relationship. Riegel took the role as an opportunity to bond with Tatiana over a character project, and said Tatiana was one of the people she was most concerned about in portraying Bianca's story.

At the time Riegel took over the role of Bianca, there were strict instructions from the show's writers and producers not to reveal Bianca as gay to anyone outside the show (as the storyline had not played out on television screens yet). Despite this, Riegel informed Tatiana two months before the storyline finally began. The revelation was easily envisioned by the sisters as a storyline from a soap opera due to Riegel having told Tatiana Bianca's secret on the day of their father's third wedding. Tatiana said that Riegel was "very excited" about informing her of Bianca's sexual orientation and that she was happy for her sister. "I just thought it was a kick that she would be playing a lesbian — specifically, Erica Kane's daughter!" said Tatiana.

Tatiana did have her concerns about the storyline. She did not want the show to do a gay stereotype. Riegel voiced the same concerns earlier on about the character; she clarified that she asked the show's writers and producers to make the character three-dimensional and not "so heavily centered" on the character's sexual orientation. Having grown up close to an out lesbian sister, who "came out" in her early 20s, Riegel was familiar with how Bianca should be if stereotypes were to be avoided. At the time of Tatiana's "coming-out" process, Riegel and brother Sam were children. Tatiana relayed that being gay was not an issue and that she could not remember having had a conversation with them about it at that age. By the time Riegel and Sam were old enough to know what being gay meant, they had grown to love Tatiana's girlfriend and the family was closer than before. Riegel having acquired the role of Bianca led her and Tatiana to discuss certain specifics of the character. Riegel's mindset was centered on what it must have been like for Tatiana to grow up as gay. She said that she had never heard Tatiana's whole coming-out story before and that it was nice to talk about.

A year and a half after Bianca's "coming out" as a lesbian, Riegel and Tatiana felt that the show had done "a great job" in telling the story of a gay woman and her struggles.

=== Characterization, story influence and recast ===
In a Variety magazine interview, Julie Hanan Carruthers, executive producer of the show, spoke of Bianca's character development. She gave insight into the "heart" of the story. "It was so successful," she said. "We did not tell a story about a lesbian. We told a story about a young girl coming out and her life around it. That was a big lesson to all of us here. It's really all about the story. If you can make people care on a human level, it's not sexual preference. It's about the human experience."

The writers characterized Bianca's personality as kind-hearted but intolerant of nonsense. These traits were given to reflect the personalities of her parents and her late grandmother (Mona). Additionally, other characters in Bianca's family have been written as protective.

Megan McTavish, the show's head writer at the time, said she was "most astonished that fans elevated Bianca into one of the serial's 'tent poles' — soap parlance for characters who hold enormous sway with viewers". McTavish explained that if a character is nice to Bianca, the audience tends to like that character, and if he is mean to Bianca, the audience knows he is a bad guy. "It's stunning," she cited. "The lesbian girl became the moral tent pole of our show."

In a 2007 interview with TV Guide, former head writers of the series, James Harmon Brown and Barbara Esensten, stated that since Riegel's portrayal, the character is simply too iconic to ever recast. However, in 2010, Riegel decided to permanently exit the role, and plans to recast were subsequently confirmed. TV Guide's Nelson Branco said, "Recasting a superstar is a very risky move, but [All My Children] is clearly determined to test fate."

In a March 30, 2010 interview with Soap Opera Digest, Riegel explained why she decided to move on from the character:

I had tried to make it work with All My Children. I don’t have a business head, so I don’t really make business decisions; every decision I make in my life is emotional and it was difficult to feel that the show wasn’t... that Bianca was getting lost. That who she was, was getting lost. I went back several times and they were so lovely to let me come back and play a character I love with the people I love so many times. But I felt that the people making the show didn’t really understand what Bianca was about anymore... It troubled me. I got letters from people to whom Bianca meant a great deal essentially saying, "Please don’t come back. We can't take it anymore."

On May 13, 2010, it was reported that All My Children had found a recast for the character, after a "long and careful" search. Actress Christina Bennett Lind, cited as having an "astonishing" resemblance to Riegel, was cast. "[Lind] oozes goodness and we really needed that for Bianca. [Lind] brought an integrity and honest innocence to the role that was very tough to match," stated Carruthers. "We turned the earth [upside down] going through the candidates. When [Lind] came in to read for the part, she was Bianca. I think it’ll be a very easy transition for the audience."

Although Riegel said it would be "very painful" to watch someone else portray Bianca, and that she would not want to watch, she later tweeted, "[All My Children] gets a new Bianca and she's super pretty! And, of course, by that I mean she looks like me. I wish her the very best of luck, of course, and will be cheering her on along with the rest of the [All My Children] fans." Lind regarded this as a compliment, and was appreciative of the support.

Lind said of assuming the role, "The audition for Bianca felt like an amusement park ride. It was such a thrill to go to an audition by plane rather than subway! I can only hope I do half of what [Riegel] did with the part. She played it with amazing grace and dignity. Now I need to breathe my own life into it." Regarding Bianca being the "moral center of Pine Valley" and the pressure of being a recast, Lind said she did feel pressure in the beginning. "I did look at some of [Riegel's] footage online to prep for it. She, for obvious reasons, was so beautiful, real, and honest in her portrayal of Bianca." Lind stated that it ultimately came down to her not wanting to mimic Riegel:

Part of me feels very strongly that [Riegel] created a character that was so well-written, detailed, and complicated, and the element of being gay was part of who she was, but it did not define her. I sort of wanted to take that and breathe my own life into it and do something else by using myself rather than using someone else’s interpretation. I understand these emotions and all humans do, of wanting to support your family and be equal and be in love. Ultimately, I said, "I can feel the pressure, but I am going to let it go." The role is so full and rich that I thought, Well, now I am just going to throw myself into it.

Lind said there was no trepidation in taking on a gay role, and that she is "really proud" to portray Bianca. "I am surprised that the gay community is still struggling and fighting so many years later," she said. "They are still fighting for basic human rights. I am excited to be a part of that fight." Regarding most of Pine Valley being okay with Bianca being gay, Lind stated that she is "a little curious" to see some "sort of real-life conflict arrive and see that some people in her small town do not accept her sexuality." Lind clarified, "In a sense, that is pretty relevant and controversial and true. Because Pine Valley is the exception, it’s a beautiful utopia right now. I wouldn’t mind attacking those issues that are happening in small towns right now."

== Storylines ==
As a child, Bianca originally appears on a recurring basis on All My Children. She was born on-screen in 1988, the out-of-wedlock daughter of Erica Kane and Travis Montgomery. Erica and Travis later wed, but the marriage soon collapses after Travis helps stage a fake kidnapping of Bianca in order to prevent Adam Chandler from taking over his company. Two years later, as Bianca is recovering from Reye's syndrome, Erica and Travis remarry for their daughter's sake. However, by that time Erica is having a secret affair with Travis' brother Jackson, and as soon as Bianca catches them kissing, she sets her "Uncle Jack" doll on fire and ends up burning the house down. After that incident, Travis divorces Erica, wins full custody of Bianca, moves to Seattle, and remarries his ex-wife, Barbara.

Although Bianca is living with her father, she visits her mother from time to time. In 1993, Kendall Hart arrives, Erica's first-born daughter Erica gave birth to at age 14 and gave up for adoption to the Harts, a couple from Florida, after becoming pregnant when she was raped on her 14th birthday by movie actor Richard Fields. A now 9- to 10-year-old Bianca becomes a target of her older half-sister's jealousy when Kendall's identity is revealed and she is reunited with Erica. Kendall, hurt she was given up for adoption, believes Bianca (in Kendall's view) had the life she should have always had too while Bianca is upset that she is not Erica's only daughter. Though she, Erica, Kendall, and her new stepfather, Dimitri, try to make their family work, Bianca and Kendall often bicker with each other, competing for Erica's attention. Bianca ruins Kendall's bridesmaid's dress and Kendall manipulates Bianca, ignoring her sister's cries when she later hears them from the Wildwind crypt after Bianca accidentally locks herself inside. In 1994, when Bianca looks for Kendall at a motel, Richard Fields finds her and attempts to molest her. However, Kendall stops him and saves Bianca from Fields before any assault occurs.

In August 1994, Bianca comes to Pine Valley again following the death of Mona Kane Tyler, so overwhelmed by her loss and furious that she did not get to spend much time with her grandmother. Later, Bianca is kidnapped by Dr. Jonathan Kinder and held her for ransom, during which he abuses her. Kinder is Erica's doctor and has her hooked on painkillers. In self-defense, Bianca pushes Kinder down his stairs. Erica thinks he is dead, and so with help from Janet Green and Skye Chandler, they bury Kinder, but he is very much alive.

After Erica is arrested in 1997 for kidnapping Madelyn Grey, the daughter of Edmund Grey and Maria Santos, Bianca runs away from Travis and Barbara to be with her mother. Travis and Barbara then arrive to take Bianca home, but after Travis tells them that Erica would never see Bianca again, Bianca faints and is rushed to the hospital. Bianca is diagnosed with anorexia nervosa and by 1998 ends up hospitalized with a feeding tube. She then goes to a New England rehabilitation center to recover.

Sixteen-year-old Bianca (her birth date 1984 now revised by the series) returns home in 2000, stunning her mother, Erica, by confessing that she is in a lesbian relationship with a girl named Sarah. Erica is unable to accept this, but Bianca does find support from Leo du Pres, who often counsels her on life matters. This earns her some jealousy from Greenlee Smythe, who tauntingly calls her LesBianca, but she and Bianca later become friends. This stemmed from Greenlee taking Bianca to see her daughter's supposed memorial, and she gave her a necklace that Leo had given her, and she passed on to her.

Sarah's family also disapproves, and to appease them she gets engaged to a man, despite still loving Bianca. Bianca's second girlfriend, Frankie Stone, comes to Pine Valley as part of her aunt Vanessa Cortlandt's ploy to distract Bianca. Frankie develops true feelings for Bianca, but is then murdered by one of Vanessa's henchmen. Soon after, Frankie's identical twin sister, Maggie, arrives and becomes friends with Bianca, often defending her when she is bullied by homophobic classmates. Despite Maggie professing to being heterosexual, she shows a romantic interest in Bianca, which is reciprocated; however, their relationship does not progress past friendship and Bianca begins dating another woman, Polish-born Lena Kundera. Bianca works with Lena at Erica's company, Enchantment Cosmetics. They fall in love, and share a chaste kiss in 2003 while at an airport. Though the relationship is tested when Bianca discovers Michael Cambias, owner of a rival cosmetics firm, has employed Lena to spy on Enchantment Cosmetics, they remain together.

In July 2003, Bianca is savagely raped by Michael. She internalizes her anguish and only tells Maggie, but eventually the entire town of Pine Valley learns the truth, which brings Bianca and her estranged mother closer. Michael is charged with rape but to the town's outrage, he is acquitted. When Bianca discovers she is pregnant as a result of the rape, Kendall, who had so often scorned Bianca in their past, unconditionally supports her sister and does not give an opinion on Bianca's choices. Michael disappears and Kendall announces she has married her sister's abuser, who shortly turns up dead with Kendall having become the primary suspect in his murder. When Bianca tells Kendall she is keeping her baby, also inspired by Kendall being part of her life, Kendall helps her sister and, with Maggie and David's help, aids her in hiding her pregnancy from everyone, including Erica. Kendall announces she is pregnant by Michael, which is also used by her lawyers to help avoid a murder charge and Bianca helps Kendall fake the pregnancy. Bianca and Kendall's ruse is aided by Dr. David Hayward, Ryan Lavery, Lena, Maggie, Reggie Montgomery, and Jackson. The truth eventually comes out that Bianca is the killer but blocked it out and that Kendall, with Reggie's help, worked to cover it up in an effort to protect Bianca; Bianca shot Michael in self-defense but the trauma of her abuse and rape led to her repressing the memory. After hearing Bianca's confession, the judge presiding over the case leans hard on the prosecution not to file any charges against her.

While Erica tries to protect her daughters throughout the trial, she lashes out at them for keeping the truth from her. Bianca gives birth to a daughter named Miranda in 2004, at a cabin which Bianca and Babe became stranded at during a thunderstorm. After a difficult birth for Bianca, Babe Carey goes to get help and ends up going into labor herself. Babe gives birth to a son with the help of her former husband Paul Cramer, whom she had called for help. During the commotion, Paul secretly kidnaps Babe's son and gives her Miranda instead, whilst claiming to Bianca that her daughter perished in a helicopter crash, which he had staged. Miranda is renamed Bess. Bianca grieves for her lost child, and even tries to kidnap Bess, not realizing she is her actual daughter. As she mourns, Bianca and Kendall become estranged from their mother, unable to reconcile that she wished Miranda had never been born. Eventually they both become close with their mother again. When Bianca discovers the truth about Miranda, she attempts to reclaim her daughter, but falls from a balcony during a scuffle with Miranda's acting father, JR Chandler, and ends up comatose. Miranda is later returned to Bianca, causing her to awake from her coma. Bianca never remembers how she fell, whether or not JR pushed her, but she holds him responsible for her fall. In addition, Bianca cannot forgive Babe, who had previously discovered Miranda/Bess's true maternity, but could not part with the child and kept her as her own for nine months.

Bianca's relationship with Lena ends when Lena returns to Poland and their long distance engagement cannot weather the distance. During this time, Bianca's relationship with Maggie subsequently becomes an issue again, as first Maggie had confessed romantic feelings for Bianca but was rejected, but once Bianca realizes that she is still in love with her Maggie is romantically involved with Jonathan Lavery. After Bianca helps free Maggie from this abusive relationship, they begin to bond again. Though the nature of Bianca and Maggie's relationship is not specified, they, along with Miranda, relocate to Paris in 2005. While there, Bianca heads up the international division of Cambias Industries, Bianca and Maggie become lovers and are happy together, but in 2007, Bianca returns to Pine Valley alone. She states Maggie has cheated on her with another woman. Maggie follows her, hoping for reconciliation, but despite loving her, Bianca declines.

Family problems resurface due to Bianca's sexuality, but this time from her conservative former stepmother Barbara, who denounces her lifestyle, but eventually sees the error of her ways. Bianca rebuilds her friendship with Babe upon finding out that Babe, who was pronounced dead as a result of a serial killer's killing spree, is alive. She then reciprocates the romantic feelings Zarf (later known as Zoe), a transgender lesbian rock star, has for her. Zoe later tells her that at this point in her transition process, a romantic relationship between them would not be best; Zoe is not ready for it, and instead moves to London. Bianca decides to move to Paris to be closer to Zoe, but returns on December 26, 2007 for a brief visit, cheering her family up following their recent traumas. Bianca reveals that she and Zoe drifted apart, but she is determined to provide a stable family unit for Miranda. After bidding farewell, she departs again on December 28, 2007.

On October 17, 2008, Zach Slater is in the process of looking for wife Kendall buried under rubble due to a tornado having just struck Pine Valley. He finds Bianca instead, and is surprised to see that she is pregnant. He later finds an unconscious Kendall. As an ambulance arrives for her, it is stated that there is not enough room for Bianca and Zach to ride along to the hospital. There is, however, enough room for Zach and Kendall's children to ride in the front seat of the ambulance. Zach and Bianca stay behind and discuss Kendall's fate. They also discuss Bianca's secret that she is pregnant with Zach's child via sperm donation, and Bianca's new lover named Reese. Zach had agreed to father Bianca's child for the couple, but did not know that she had gone through with the procedure of artificial insemination, until now. The two wonder how Kendall, who is unaware of this pregnancy, will react to the news when they tell her. As Zach and Bianca continue to talk, Bianca goes into labor. Zach helps deliver the new child into the world. Sometime later at the hospital, she is horrified to discover that Babe has perished in the disaster's aftermath. Reese Williams comes to Pine Valley, not long after the tornado with Miranda. She proposes marriage to Bianca and she accepts. Reese and Bianca have their share of obstacles to overcome as a couple, mainly Bianca's suspicions of Reese's sexuality and friendship with Zach, but they exchange wedding vows on February 13, 2009.

Reese and Bianca's marriage does not last long when Bianca discovers that Reese engaged in a passionate kiss with Zach the day before their wedding. She later sends Reese annulment papers, and returns to Paris with Miranda and Gabrielle. However, she comes back to Pine Valley on April 24, 2009 after having discussed with Zach the reasons she left. After later talking over her and Reese's relationship problems with Zach and Kendall, the couple reconcile and hope that they can work their relationship out. They return to Paris together with their children, and later remarry.

Bianca returns to Pine Valley to help search for Erica in June 2010, and eventually decides to stay. After Erica is found by Jackson Montgomery, Jack has Miranda and Gabrielle flown to Pine Valley. Currently, Miranda, Gabrielle, and Bianca are living at Wildwind with Caleb Cooney. After Reese decides that she is not coming back to Pine Valley, Bianca reluctantly decides to get a divorce, hiring Marissa Tasker for this end.

Marissa warns Bianca that Reese may fight to gain custody of her kids and things may get ugly, but Bianca dismisses her concerns, convinced that she and Reese can end things civilly and that Marissa is merely letting her experience with JR get in the way. However, when Reese sends her lawyer and nanny to Pine Valley in her place with tickets for Miranda and Gabrielle to come back for spring break, Bianca realizes that Marissa's fears may not be completely unfounded. However, Marissa manages to get Jack and Erica to come to Bianca's aid, where Jack forces them to back off and leave. Bianca thanks Marissa and apologizes for doubting her. Bianca is subjected to even further turmoil when she discovers that Reese is indeed trying to obtain full custody of both Miranda and Gabby.

On May 26, Bianca discovers that Ricky Torres, a seemingly friendly reverend, is in fact a criminal and the murderer of Zach. Realizing that she is on to him, Ricky assaults her. In the midst of the assault, Bianca remembers getting raped by Michael Cambias and suffers a panic attack. When Marissa comes along and sees Ricky carrying an unconscious Bianca, Ricky knocks her out, ties them up, and locks them in the closet. Upon regaining consciousness, Bianca reveals Ricky's true nature to Marissa, and they manage to escape. Bianca subsequently realizes that she is developing romantic feelings for Marissa.

Because of these romantic feelings, Bianca helps JR win Marissa back by suggesting romantic dates and gifts that he can give to Marissa. Bianca does all this because she realizes that Marissa may never reciprocate the same feelings for her. One of the gifts that Bianca gives to JR for Marissa is a music box. This music box plays a song that Marissa's adoptive father used to sing to her when she was a little girl. JR gives the music box to Marissa while at the park with the kids. While Marissa is listening to the music box, Bianca watches from afar how much Marissa enjoys the gift and walks away.

On June 24, while on a trip with the kids, Bianca finally confesses her feelings to Marissa. Marissa, surprised, says that she is flattered and loves Bianca, just not in that way. Marissa apologizes and says she is straight. Bianca feels relieved that she got her feelings out in the open and she can now move on. Marissa, now feeling uncomfortable, leaves the trip early for JR's birthday. Marissa, after she slept with JR, thinks about Bianca.

When Marissa finds out about Bianca helping JR with trying to win her back, she asks Bianca about. Bianca tells Marissa she did it because Bianca could not do all those things for Marissa herself. Another reason was because it looked like Marissa was falling in love with JR again and because it seemed like JR had changed. Marissa accuses Bianca of manipulating her and the situation. Bianca suggests that they should not see each other for a while and Marissa agrees.

On July 12, Marissa finally admits her feelings for Bianca and they kiss. Bianca then pulls away during the kiss, saying that she can't do this and that this is a mistake. Bianca then explains that all her relationships have been a dead end – that, in the end, she ends up losing her lover and best friend. However, later on, Bianca walks in as Marissa tells JR that she wants Bianca. Marissa then confesses to both Bianca and JR that she is in love with Bianca. In the following weeks, Bianca and Marissa start dating, much to JR's fury, and discuss moving in together.

On September 23, Marissa and Bianca received a text message that they believed was from Scott who invited them to a party at the Chandler mansion to celebrate the resurrection of Stuart Chandler who had been presumed dead for two years until he was revealed to be alive as a part of Project Orpheus. They attended the party and enjoyed celebrating life in Pine Valley when JR, in a drunken rage, shot into the crowd. It is revealed on May 2, 2013 that Marissa died and that she was the one who JR shot. Marissa's father, David, tried to stop JR from pulling the trigger, but the gun misfired. David then threw JR to the floor and shot him and as a result, JR lapsed into a five-year-long coma. David was arrested and jailed for the incident but later returned to Pine Valley after being paroled. Bianca is seen visiting Marissa's grave and updating Marissa on her son AJ and Miranda, whom they had planned to raise together. Bianca tells Marissa that they were supposed to be together and that she will never stop missing her. After JR awakens from his coma, Bianca becomes upset when she sees him, going into a fit of grief and attacking him for killing Marissa. Bianca leaves Pine Valley telling everyone she is going away for work, but she is shown visiting her sister Kendall, who appears to be ill.

== Cultural impact ==
=== Popularity ===
Lena (Olga Sosnovska) and Bianca (Riegel) share the first lesbian kiss in American soap opera history (2003).

Bianca has been popular with critics and fans. Her romantic pairing with Lena Kundera resulted in American daytime's first lesbian kiss, which received substantial media attention. The following year, in 2004, Riegel appeared on the cover of Girlfriends, North America’s only lesbian monthly magazine; the content within the piece discussed Riegel's titled breakthrough lesbian role.

Riegel's portrayal of the character incited mania, admiration, and viewers displaying overprotectiveness for the character. Riegel additionally won praise from leading gay groups for her "complex portrayal" of Bianca.

==== Daytime and visibility ====
Bianca's impact on daytime television is considered significant for various reasons: She is cited as a gay icon by soap opera and gay/lesbian media, and is credited as the first long-term lesbian character on an American soap opera. AfterElton.com, a website that focuses on the portrayal of gay men in the media, addressed Bianca's impact on viewers. They noted All My Children creator Agnes Nixon having told The Advocate in 2000 that out-lesbian Chaz Bono's memoir was the inspiration for the Bianca storyline, and that she hoped that outing an already-established character as gay would make for a more integrated storyline. AfterElton.com said the representation of gay and lesbian characters in the media is important when taking into account that the viewing audience for soap operas "is enormous." Cited was The Museum of Broadcast Communications's assertion that soap opera is "the most effective and enduring broadcast advertising vehicle ever devised. It is also the most popular genre of television drama in the world today and probably in the history of world broadcasting..." The museum states that "no other form of television fiction has attracted more viewers in more countries over a longer period of time." Author C. Lee Harrington, in her book Homosexuality on All My Children: Transforming the Daytime Landscape, stated that when "resident villainess" Greenlee Smythe uttered "Bianca is gay" during Bianca's coming-out storyline, it transformed the daytime landscape and ABC's All My Children entered "uncharted territory" for daytime television by revealing a core character as a lesbian.

Jeffrey Epstein, at the time a staff writer for Soap Opera News, was criticized by AfterElton.com for his statement in 1998, where he discouraged the idea that there would be more gay or lesbian representation to come on daytime television due to soap operas being mostly viewed by women and that gay or lesbian romances do not truly enrich most heterosexual women's fantasies. AfterElton.com relayed that the viewing demographic for soap operas continues to grow and diversify, further clarifying, "The popularity of the Bianca storyline on All My Children was proof that audiences were more than ready for a lesbian relationship, and his assessment of women's romantic fantasies in regards to gay male characters may prove to be equally outdated."

In 2001, Riegel was voted one of Soaps' Hottest Newcomers by Soap Opera Digest and the following year as one of Soaps' Hottest Teens by the same magazine. Riegel modestly accepted, "What does that mean, 'hot?' Does that mean I'm hot, like sexy? I feel pretty damn hot. I wish I knew what it meant. No, that's very flattering." In 2003, Bianca was the winner of the first GLAAD Media Award as Favorite OUT Image. With her win, GLAAD released a statement:

The winner of the first people's choice award in GLAAD Media Awards history, the Favorite OUT Image of 2003 Award, was also announced Monday. With the help of founding sponsor ABSOLUT VODKA, GLAAD promoted an online poll in which fans voted for their favorite gay character or openly gay personality from the world of entertainment. The winner — Bianca from All My Children — was selected from voters in over 20 countries. Actress Eden Riegel, who plays Bianca Montgomery, accepted the award.

Lesbianation.com, self-proclaimed as the leading online community for lesbians, voted Riegel #7 on their top ten list of Women We Love: The Ladies of June '06, stating, "We were swamped with requests to add All My Children hottie Eden Riegel to our list this month — and here she is!"

Bianca's popularity extended to her romances, as well as to other perceived possibilities; this was evident through the character's relationships with Maggie Stone, Lena Kundera, and Babe Carey. The relationship with Carey was not romantic, as Babe (now deceased within the series) was characterized as heterosexual; however, fans speculated that Bianca was secretly in love with Babe. This speculation was mainly due to Bianca's nonchalant and forgiving attitude regarding most of Babe's misdeeds. AfterEllen.com took notice and acknowledged that there were viewers hoping for a Bianca and Babe romance.

==== "Give Bianca her baby back" ====
...As Americans were choosing sides over gay marriage and arguing about campaign references to Vice President Dick Cheney's openly gay daughter, there was one concern quietly uniting people across the ideological spectrum: Bianca Montgomery deserved to get her baby back.

— Patrick D. Healy of The New York Times

In 2004, with Bianca's rape having left her subsequently pregnant with Michael's child, and the baby switch storyline having robbed her of her daughter, viewers were infuriated by what they felt was the pain the character had endured within the year. They additionally found the Bianca and Babe friendship unappealing, specifically due to Babe knowingly keeping Bianca from her own child. Within the story, Babe is initially unaware that her child has been switched with Bianca's and that Bianca's child, the one she is caring for, is still alive and not dead as she had been led to believe. However, once convinced by Krystal to keep Bianca's child as her own in order to save JR from heartbreak, she does as advised. Due to her guilt, she goes as far as to name Bianca godmother of the child. Angered by these events, viewers campaigned for Bianca to discover the truth. The amount of mail sent to the ABC studios requesting and demanding that Bianca's baby be returned to her was cited as astounding for a fictional character, especially one of daytime — and who is also gay: "Bianca's sexuality did not seem to matter to the thousands of fans who wrote letters, e-mail messages, and blog entries insisting that the only safe place for the baby was back in the arms of Pine Valley's one known lesbian."

Described as "Babe's long-overdue confessional" and beginning of redemption, she confesses to Bianca the truth about their children on December 7, 2004. The culmination of this storyline combined with everything Bianca faces up to this point "transform[s] Bianca into a courageous soap heroine who ha[s] fans rooting for her." Viewers became even more invested in her trials and tribulations and hopeful for the character finding romance. Brian Frons, president of ABC Daytime, stated:

To have someone like Bianca who is openly gay, a mother, proud of who she is, who has fallen in love with another woman, who is taking heroic action — to have the audience embrace this character fully is pretty incredible. The audience went from 'I don't want to see a lesbian relationship' to saying, 'Bianca should be in love.'

Havins and Riegel described what went into taping the moment Bianca discovers that her child is alive and Babe's deception. "It was crazy!," said Riegel of the "grueling" day. "It was insane, in fact. [Havins] and I were on the set from 9 a.m. to like 7:30 at night, just the two of us." Havins agreed and relayed, "It was so intense to tape. It was a long, long day, a 12-hour tape day." They were warned by All My Children executives that the episode would be "especially" demanding. "I don't think they've ever handed that much material to just two actresses before, so they wanted us to be prepared," said Riegel. "It was the most dialogue I've ever had in my entire life. To the point where several weeks before they gave me the script, our producer, Julie [Hanan Carruthers], sat us down and said to us, 'This is just so important.,'" added Havins. "And she turned to me and said, 'We're almost nervous because it's so much material. If it's too much, let us know.' It was that dialogue-heavy."

Riegel found humor in the situation and said, "Unfortunately, we only got the script like three days ahead of time! But hey! We're old pros." When asked if they were intimidated by the challenge of the reveal scenes, Riegel asserted that she "wasn't scared at all," and clarified that it "was a good challenge" and "one of those things where it's like, 'This is what I do. This is what I love.'" She said, "To have all that material and to be there in the moment ... I didn't want to be in any other place." She found it exciting. Having waited for the moment "for a long time," it turned out to be "a big pay-off." She added:

But I was a little nervous because this was definitely a very, very special episode. That was the biggest challenge to me; I was going in there knowing, 'This is the moment.' I kept having to make myself laugh and leave set and play with my friends in the hair and makeup room and just sort of try to view the day as though it was just an average taping day because the last thing those scenes needed from my character's perspective was that sense of gravity, that feeling of, 'This is so important.' Because it was not a big deal for my character — she had no idea what was coming.

Havins agreed with Riegel that the reveal scenes were exciting. "I'm always up for a challenge and I work best under pressure," she said. "My competitive side kicks in. So the thought that I maybe couldn't do it made me be like, 'Oh, yeah, I'm doin' it!' We put so much preparation into it." Justin Bruening (Jamie Martin) and Jacob Young (JR) were the only other cast members in the episode. "...I worked with a private coach, we worked on it together.... We put a lot of time into this episode," Havins stated. "We usually don't have that luxury, but this time we did; this took priority. And shooting it, too, we knew it was a big deal." She revealed that the producers and director were patient with them. "And if we felt we didn't like where a take went, usually they're like, 'No, it's fine, let's move on,' but this time they were like, 'Let's do it again. We loved that take, girls, but let's try something else,' and we'd go in a totally different direction." She said, "They took the time and they were as invested in this episode as [Riegel] and I were, so that was a really good feeling. We were all there, we were all in it together, and hopefully, the finished product shows it."

In 2005, Riegel won an Emmy for the role. When she decided to leave the show that same year to pursue other acting ventures, it was suggested that the gay community would be losing a viable voice.

=== Controversy ===
==== Coming out ====
Scripting legendary character Erica as having a gay daughter initially upset a significant portion of the audience. "Viewers were deeply attached to the character as the 16-year-old daughter of [the leading soap opera diva]. ABC held a series of focus groups to gauge audience reaction." Female viewers in Boston and some in Atlanta found the storyline "refreshing and reflective" of what they called the "real world and its diversity." The Atlanta group, however, had a good portion who were concerned about morality and did not want a major character "saddled with a lifelong problem." Boston viewers felt Bianca's problem was being in the closet; Atlantans voiced her problem was her sexual preference itself. In addition, there was opposition to the increased love for the character. Critics of gay marriage groups and individuals complained about a sympathetic gay heroine, saying Bianca made daytime television even more licentious.

==== Rape debate ====
Bianca's rape was heavily debated; viewers who despised the storyline argued the rape as "punishment" for her sexuality, and as unnecessary; others felt that it realistically captured what gay women sometimes face from men who want to force themselves on lesbians. When GLAAD (Gay & Lesbian Alliance Against Defamation) was asked by Metro Weekly why GLAAD sent out an action alert voicing their concern over the rape of Bianca, but two days later sent out another release which seemed to support how the storyline was told, Joan M. Garry, executive director of the organization, responded that they had "some concerns" about [the storyline] and "that the broader context of the [daytime television] genre kind of needs to be taken into account." Metro Weekly felt that this did not answer their question. They wanted to know why there was a sudden reversal in GLAAD's statement, specifically citing that GLAAD's second press release spoke of rape experience for lesbians and how men who rape lesbians not only engage in gender based acts of violence, but in acts of hate violence, and that this release was supportive of how Bianca's rape storyline was told, as opposed to GLAAD's first press release on the matter. Garry said she felt that their first press release concerning Bianca's rape was premature. Metro Weekly countered by asking what is the "actual process" GLAAD uses to select what to criticize, what raises their organization's red flags. "There's a whole host of input we receive about things as we hear about them, as we see them in script form, as we see them in pilots," Garry relayed. "We have a strong team of program folks who represent different regions around the country, different communities. We get an awful lot of stuff that comes across the transom via our website raising concerns. And we did get quite a number of concerns coming over email, particularly about All My Children." Garry continued, "So it's basically community feedback, as well as some of our own observations and perceptions. Combine that with conversations that we have with folks that are actually producing the images and we really try to work our way through those different opinions and shape a position we think makes sense."

In an interview with Soap Opera Digest, Riegel detailed what it was like preparing for her character's rape scenes. She explained that it was grueling and that there were only four people in the episode. She found it to be "very work-intensive," emotionally haunting, and voiced that she had trouble sleeping. She elaborated that "these" types of scenes really stay with a person. Riegel and co-star William deVry (Michael Cambias) rehearsed the scenes on their own, which normally would not have been the case. Riegel commented that it definitely required more work than an ordinary episode. Asked if she was frightened of deVry during Bianca's rape scenes, she admitted that she was and that it was a testament to deVry's acting skills. About the uneasiness of the scenes and whether or not she was frightened or intimidated by "the gravity" of the storyline, she stated, "Absolutely, I was. To be honest, I didn't know if I could handle it. But I knew it was a very important thing to do and that the show was serious about handling it well." She added, "I knew we could reach people, and that it was powerful stuff. I could feel the power of it. And I knew I should put myself through this because ultimately it might help somebody, touch somebody, make people talk about it. And rape is something people should talk about."

==== Transgender romance ====
Bianca's romantic attraction to transgender rockstar Zarf/Zoe was met with criticism from the gay and lesbian community, and fans in general. They asserted that, as a lesbian, it is illogical for Bianca to be intensely romantically attracted to a transgender woman who is still of the male form, and that even more stressing was that the show conveyed the story as soul-love (the belief that sexual orientation can be negated if you simply love that person's soul). Viewers titled the couple "Barf" (for Bianca and Zarf), and TV Guide, which reported the nickname, named the storyline one of the worst of 2007.

The San Francisco Bay Area Reporter, Inc., a free weekly newspaper serving the lesbian, gay, bisexual, and transgender (LGBT) communities in the area, were one of the first to comment on their discontent with the matter:

We have repeatedly voiced our displeasure over the transgender/lesbian storyline between Zarf/Zoe and Bianca. We disagree with the basic premise, Zarf/Zoe as a MTF transgendered lesbian. We want Bianca to be with a woman (and she did have a one-night stand with Leslie on New Year's Eve, which has to be a first for a daytime soap). We don’t want her already messy love life in which she has never been allowed to have a fully realized relationship with another woman (her first lover went crazy and was institutionalized, her next was killed, the next was a corporate thief who then had to return to Poland, the next identical twin of the one who was killed wasn’t sure she was even queer and then left her for another woman). We don’t want her life complicated with the complexities of a transgender relationship.

The Wow Report delivered a scathing remark when they referred to Zarf as a drag queen and commented on their disbelief that All My Children was winning GLAAD awards.

==== Gabrielle Montgomery ====
In October 2008, with Bianca's return to the series during a series of tornadoes striking fictional town Pine Valley, Bianca was reported to be pregnant with her second child. Fans immediately began speculating on who the sperm donor was, which caught the attention of soap opera press, LGBT press, and other media outlets. TV Guide reported that "nobody knows [Bianca's] in town until her brother-in-law finds her under the rubble." SOAPnet stated, "The physical affects [sic] of the tornado are miniscule [sic] compared to the ripples Bianca’s presence creates." Another soap opera website sensationalized the story by stating, "When Bianca returns to town this time, she will have a brand new ‘someone special’ in her life and a big surprise — Bianca is pregnant! And wait until everyone finds out who the 'father' is."

Fans, aware that Miranda Montgomery, Bianca's first child, who was the result of rapist Michael Cambias, speculated Zach Slater as the child's biological father; Zach was Michael's older brother. Fans theorized that Bianca wanted a baby closely related to Miranda and asked Zach to father the child. If Bianca were already pregnant when she got to Pine Valley, then Zach could have "donated" last time Bianca was in town, even though the timing within the series was off.

Another theory concluded Bianca’s former love Zarf/Zoe as the father; the argument arose over a website putting "father" in quotations. The "father" is really a "mother" trapped in a "father’s" body, went the theory.

Zach was eventually confirmed as the father of the child by magazine Soap Opera Digest, and Bianca's reasons for asking Zach to be the donor and doing so without informing her sister and Zach's wife, Kendall Hart Slater, infuriated viewers. They reasoned that neither Bianca nor Zach would do this to Kendall.

The child was soon named Gabrielle Montgomery, and the choice for Zach as the father made Miranda and the new child not only half-sisters, but cousins as well, which some viewers found "icky."

== See also ==
- Bianca Montgomery and Maggie Stone
- Lena Kundera and Bianca Montgomery
- Reese Williams and Bianca Montgomery
- Supercouple
