= Lena Kundera and Bianca Montgomery =

Fictional characters

- Olga Sosnovska as Lena (left) and Eden Riegel as Bianca (right).
- Known for: First lesbian couple on an American soap opera

Lena Kundera and Bianca Montgomery are fictional characters from the American daytime drama All My Children. Commonly referred to by the portmanteau "Lianca" (for Lena and Bianca), they were the first lesbian couple on an American soap opera. Lena was portrayed by Olga Sosnovska, and Bianca was portrayed by Eden Riegel. Lena and Bianca's romance "quickly became a hit with viewers" and regularly surpassed older more established heterosexual couples for the number 1 spot on Internet and soap opera magazine readers' polls. The characters are the first to share a same-sex kiss in American soap opera history.

== Background ==
=== Writing and portrayals ===
The writers characterized resident lesbian and good girl Bianca Montgomery's romantic life as tortured; she consistently fell for heterosexual or unavailable women. When the series showcased her having fallen in love with best friend and confidante Maggie Stone (Elizabeth Hendrickson), this theme was continued. Maggie declared herself heterosexual and told Bianca she was only romantically interested in men. To show Bianca moving on, and to add conflict to Bianca and Maggie's relationship, the writers introduced Lena Kundera in December 2002. Lena, a "sassy" bisexual from Poland, was characterized as a temptress "in the mold of Juliette Binoche". Bianca instantly found Lena attractive and competed for her attention with friend Boyd Larraby (Marc Menard), as they bet on which one of them could date Lena first. Viewers watched as Lena began spending time with Bianca as part of an "evil plan" to take over Bianca's mother's company, but also as she found herself falling in love with Bianca. In an interview reported by the New York Post, Brian Frons, head of ABC Daytime, stated that he considered the Lena and Bianca pairing "much bolder" than romantically pairing Bianca with "longtime" galpal Maggie.

Bianca was 19 and Lena was in her late 20s, around the same age as Boyd. The writers had Bianca win the bet against Boyd, and Lena and Bianca bond easier despite their age difference. Boyd was suspicious of Lena's intentions, and persuaded mother-figure Myrtle Fargate (Eileen Herlie) to chaperone the couple. Though Myrtle saw nothing to convince her of malice on Lena's part, Boyd's suspicions were valid. "Lena has made a lot of mistakes in her past," clarified Eden Riegel, Bianca's portrayer. "She has not proven herself a very nice person. Of course, Bianca doesn't know that. And now Lena is working with Michael (a bad guy played by William deVry) to try to take down Enchantment." Michael Cambias, portrayed by actor William deVry, was scripted as Lena's business partner and lover. As part of a secret plot to destroy Bianca's mother, Erica Kane, and her cosmetics company (Enchantment), Lena was told by Michael to get close to Bianca so Bianca could be more easily manipulated.

The writers showcased Lena's guilt regarding the takeover plan after she developed romantic feelings for Bianca. She refused to continue the manipulation, but was blackmailed by Michael into following through with the takeover. Lena eventually decided to leave town rather than betray Bianca and tell her the truth. She informed Bianca that she could never see her again. "For Bianca, this was a huge disappointment," said Riegel. "Every time she opens up to a woman, she gets her heart broken."

To reunite the couple in dramatic fashion, the show had Myrtle urge Bianca to follow Lena to the airport and demand an explanation; on the April 23, 2003 episode, the two characters shared the first same-sex kiss in American soap opera history. "It's that kind of old romantic airport scene in which the two lovers decide whether they can take the risk and take a chance on love -- only it's two women this time," relayed Riegel. Riegel had never kissed a woman before. "I was a little nervous because I wanted it to look natural and organic and real and true," she said. "I didn't want it to seem tentative." Riegel and Olga Sosnovska discussed practicing the kiss. "We thought about maybe trying it out in the dressing room first," Riegel laughed. "But then we just thought, 'We are professionals. This will be fine." The writers detailed "fun and daring" moves in the episode, such as having Bianca discuss with Myrtle her confusion about Lena leaving her. Myrtle, in her aristocratic British accent, replied, "Maybe it was too hot!" Giving insight into Bianca's unlucky romantic life, she suggested that Bianca loves unavailable women because her mother is always running away from true love.

The physical aspects of Lena and Bianca's romance were heavily downplayed by the series. When asked if she thought she and Riegel had succeeded in living up to the "couple's groundbreaking and progressive" reputation, Sosnovska responded, "Yes, we succeeded to a certain extent. We succeeded in making this couple acceptable." After a pause, Sosnovska continued, "Not acceptable in a realistic sense, since our relationship hasn’t been portrayed truly realistically, which would have been nice." She described Bianca and Lena's physical relationship as "kind of ostentatiously reserved" compared to what gets shown between heterosexual couples, "although I’m quite shocked by what does get shown between the heterosexual couples." Even though the couple had recently started "dating" again, as the writers also scripted a love triangle including Maggie, there was an apparent double standard regarding intimacy between the same-sex lovers; in the entire year of Lena and Bianca's on-again, off-again relationship, the two women had only kissed twice onscreen. The final obstacles given to the couple's onscreen intimacy were Bianca's rape by Michael and pregnancy with his child, which were controversial and seen by viewers as desperate attempts by the network to avoid lesbian love scenes. AfterEllen.com editor Sarah Warn stated that it was a way to assure Bianca's continued asexuality. Warn added that "the pregnant-lesbian storyline" is a favorite refuge for television writers who both want to avoid dealing with the sexual aspects of lesbian relationships and who want to "normalize" the lesbian characters—"to show viewers that, at their core, lesbians are just like heterosexual women—who of course, all want to be mothers". In 2004, though Lena and Bianca were allowed to kiss for a third time onscreen, it came at the end of their romance, as Lena went back to Poland to tend to her ailing mother and the couple was later written to have broken up over the phone.

== Reception and impact ==
=== 2003 kiss ===
A magazine cover touting Lena and Bianca's first kiss.

All My Children made television history on April 23, 2003 when Lena and Bianca shared the first same-sex kiss in American soap opera history. The kiss was not the first same-sex kiss for daytime television. The United Kingdom had featured its first lesbian kiss between fictional characters on the soap opera Brookside ten years earlier in December 1993, portrayed by actresses Anna Friel and Nicola Stephenson. Lena and Bianca sharing a kiss, however, and also being between two people of the same sex, was something that had been thought of as unlikely for American soap opera. The kiss received media attention such as TV Guide, Soap Opera Digest, and other publications. On the day before the kiss aired, Riegel and Sosnovska appeared on the morning talk show The View and answered questions from Barbara Walters and the other hosts, including guest host Monica Lewinsky. Star Jones introduced the segment by stating that All My Children had dealt with a number of controversial topics, including "AIDS, abortion, drug abuse, racial prejudice, and teenage alcoholism, but no storyline has generated the kind of buzz as the lesbian kiss". The kiss was shown to the audience and followed up with questions by the hosts consisting of whether the actresses were nervous acting out the intimate scenes and what it was like to portray lesbians.

Critics were mixed on how the Lena and Bianca kiss was portrayed, on whether it was as realistic as it should be. Heather Havrilesky of Salon.com stated, "Not the most passionate kiss, but satisfying enough, given that most of the episode was devoted to showcasing the big event." The kiss represented a change in American culture. Stephen Tropiano of PopMatters said, "In perhaps what could be a step in the right direction, daytime television has at last included the first on-screen kiss between a same-sex couple." Tropiano, however, criticized shows treating same-sex kisses as "big events". He stated, "Over the years, television has repeatedly made the same point by treating a kiss exchanged between two members of the same sex as something out-of-the-ordinary and unnatural. It's the network brass more than television series writers and producers who have reinforced society's negative attitudes toward public displays of affection between gay and lesbian couples by treating same-sex kissing as a taboo subject." Tropiano wondered now that Lena and Bianca had kissed if they would kiss again or go beyond that in regards to physical intimacy; he felt that it was not likely until society, or at least, television, began to regard a same-sex kiss as just a kiss.

When asked if soap opera fans were ready for the kiss, Riegel stated, "I know that on the (Internet) message boards, there is a small but vocal minority that didn't want to see this. But the vast majority (of fans) were ready, excited and with the storyline." For All My Children fans, who had witnessed Bianca's unlucky romantic life, the kiss "was long overdue".

=== Popularity ===
Lena and Bianca's romance was groundbreaking. Prime time television was already significantly ahead of soap operas in their representation of gay men and lesbians. With the pairing of Lena and Bianca, American soap opera was given a level of LGBT visibility that it had not had before, and now had two lesbian icons instead of Bianca by herself. The pairing "quickly became a hit with viewers" and regularly surpassed older more established heterosexual couples for the number 1 spot on Internet and soap opera magazine readers' polls. "In another historical first, in October 2003, 60,000 votes were cast" in Soap Opera Weekly's Hottest Soap Couple contest; Lena and Bianca emerged as the winning couple; this resulted in the first time a same-sex couple had ever been featured in a 2-page "glossy" centerfold poster, which was "sold at grocery store check-out counters across America with nary a complaint". This was viewed as groundbreaking social change.

Though the couple was popular, they were also controversial. Sosnovska was asked if she realized that by accepting this role she would be stepping into "so much" controversy. "I’m still coming to terms with this phenomenon of Lianca," she replied, "with the devotion that I’m shown as a couple on TV, and the whole concept of fans. The letters that I get are heart breaking. It’s horrible that even now in the 21st century [so many lesbians] feel the need to hide. Not everyone is confident enough to face the world, and not everyone lives in a safe environment." She continued, "I never really thought about it before--it doesn’t occur to you that this medieval type of mentality occurs. It’s horrifying what happens." Sosnovska did, however, see the decision to be out as a personal choice. "I don’t blame people who choose not be out," she said. She donated her time to fan sponsored fundraisers that raised money for several charities connected to the Lena and Bianca storylines. Over $20,000 had been raised for the New York City Gay and Lesbian Anti-Violence Project. Sosnovska stated, "I would never have known what a powerful tool TV could be, especially daytime. It’s frightening to the extent it’s a huge responsibility on the producers, directors, and actors to influence minds. You can’t underestimate the force of it."

Sosnovska was overwhelmed by the outpouring of support from fans. "I apologize to anybody who’s sent me anything and hasn’t gotten a reply. I physically can’t keep up with it (the volume of mail), especially when I go away," she said in emphasis of a recent trip to London she had made. In addition to helping with fundraisers, Sosnovska was outspoken about gay marriage. "I've been listening to the debate about gay marriage, she said. "It’s very difficult to wrap my head around people who oppose such a basic right. There’s no logic behind any of these reasons [against gay marriage]. [Those opposed to it] have no idea about the fact that they’re talking about normal people." In this respect, Sosnovska hoped her role as Lena had helped, if even a little, since "the more human faces you can put to this story, the better".

AfterEllen.com cites that lesbian and bisexual women do not have "many characters" they can call their own, and had never had a daytime couple that they "could pin [their] hopes and dreams on". Sosnovska and Riegel together as Lena and Bianca "became that couple" and the audience was given "the chance to see two sexy, confident, and very out women together as daytime television's first lesbian couple". Though prime time dramas such as The L Word feature more lesbian and bisexual content, it is only available on cable. All My Children's advantage is that it is seen "everyday [sic] in homes across the country that might not intentionally tune into shows with lesbian characters". The fact that a significant portion of viewers grew up with some of these characters enabled the series to develop "a certain comfort level" with the audience that other television characters do not have.

AfterEllen.com theorized that what endeared the Lena and Bianca romance to "so many viewers across the country" and allowed them to create a significant contribution to the acceptance of lesbians and bisexual women onscreen and in society was chemistry This chemistry, the website reasoned, made the pairing a fan favorite. The website stated that "one of the main reasons that viewers both gay and straight" thoroughly liked this pairing "was the amazingly realistic portrayal of two people in love who just happen to be women".

"They are both sensational actresses who, though heterosexual, committed wholly to the relationship," said Mimi Torchin, former founding editor-in-chief of Soap Opera Weekly and then columnist for the magazine along with soap opera website SOAPnet.com. "You weren't aware so much that history was being made, but rather that this was something beautiful and special that you had never seen before," she stated. "There was a purity to their love that made it non-threatening to the straight audience."

Lena and Bianca's romance was a classic soap opera story of love and redemption—the bad girl saved by the love of an innocent. They became one of the show's most successful romances. "[Lena and Bianca were the No. 1 couple in daytime]," said Riegel. "They embraced Bianca with a fervor usually reserved for only the hunkiest of heroes. That experience taught me to never underestimate the open-mindedness of daytime audiences."

== See also ==
- Bianca Montgomery and Maggie Stone
- List of supercouples
- Reese Williams and Bianca Montgomery
- Supercouple
