= Nathalie Paulding =

American actress

- Born: Nathalie Nicole Paulding; May 17, 1985 (age 41)
- Occupation: Actress
- Years active: 1994–present

Nathalie Nicole Paulding (born May 17, 1985) is an American actress; she has performed in American theatre, film, and television.

== Early life ==
Living in Hollywood, Florida, in 1994, Paulding was enrolled in the Little Flower Montessori School in Fort Lauderdale, Florida, at age 9.

== Career ==
Paulding has made several appearances in film, television and theatre since the early 1990s.

=== Performance credits ===
==== Theatre ====
- Les Misérables (1994), Young Eponine & Young Cosette (a Broadway production at the Imperial Theatre)
- The Miracle Worker (1996), Helen Keller (a revival production at the George Street Playhouse)
- Summer and Smoke (1996), young Alma Winemiller (a Broadway revival production by the Roundabout Theatre Company at the Criterion Center Stage Right in New York City)
- The Devils (1997), Matryosha (an off-Broadway production at the New York Theatre Workshop)
- The Diary of Anne Frank (1997—1998), Anne Frank (replacing Natalie Portman in the Broadway revival production at the Music Box Theatre)
- Lake Hollywood (1999), Monica (an off-Broadway production by the Signature Theatre Company at the Peter Norton Space)
- The Member of the Wedding (2005), Frankie Addams (at the Ford's Theatre)
- In May 2006, Paulding participated in the 24th annual Young Playwrights Festival, a three-week engagement of new plays by writers age 18 or younger, hosted by Young Playwrights Inc. — founded by Stephen Sondheim — at the Peter Jay Sharp Theatre at Symphony Space.

==== Television ====
- All My Children (1997–98), Bianca Montgomery – recurring role
- Third Watch (1999), Sunny - episodes "Hell is What You Make of It" and "Sunny, Like Sunshine"
- Law & Order: Special Victims Unit (2003), Patty Swanson – "Mercy"
- Cold Case (2005), Quinn Ellis (1988) – episode "Family"

==== Film ====
- Bully (2001), Claudia
- Bringing Rain (2003), Mu
- The Life Before Her Eyes (2008), Amanda
