= Mackenzie Aladjem =

American retired actress (born 2001)

- Born: September 11, 2001 (age 25); California, United States
- Occupation: Actress
- Years active: 2007–2017

Mackenzie Aladjem (born September 11, 2001) is an American actress. She co-starred in the Showtime series Nurse Jackie as the title character's daughter, Fiona Peyton, for which she won a Young Artist Award. She also appeared in the soap opera All My Children as Miranda Montgomery from 2010 to 2011.

== Career ==
Aladjem has appeared in television shows including Nurse Jackie and All My Children. She has also performed in the national tour of the Broadway stage production of Annie portraying the character Molly. Aladjem has been performing since age four. She made her film debut in the film The Lincoln Lawyer, based on the book by Michael Connelly.

== Filmography ==
Year	Film	Role	Notes
2007	CSI: Miami	Emma Wade	Television series (Episode: "Born to Kill")
2007	Passions	Pamela	Television soap opera (Episode: #1.2000)
2007	Passions	Pamela	Television soap opera (Episode: #1.2001)
2010-2015	Nurse Jackie	Fiona Peyton	
2010-2011	All My Children	Miranda Montgomery	
2011	The Lincoln Lawyer	Hayley Haller	Film debut
2011	Workaholics	Girl #2	Television series (Episode: "Heist School")
2012	This Is 40	Judith	
2012	Of Two Minds	Mollie Clarke	Television movie
2013	Grey's Anatomy	Emma	Television series (Episode: "Idle Hands")
2016	Time Toys	Jenny Johnstone	Film
2016	Criminal Minds	Lily	Television series (Episode: "Hostage")
2017	Hawaii Five-0	Moani Amosa/Tanya Morrison	Television series (Episodes: "Exodus/Puka 'ana–s7ep19"; "Ua mau ke ea o ka 'aina i ka pono–s7ep25")

== Awards ==
Year	Award	Category	Film	Result
2011	Young Artist Awards	Best Performance in a TV Series — Recurring Young Actress Ten and Under	Nurse Jackie	Won
2011	Young Artist Awards	Best Performance in a Daytime TV Series — Young Actress 12 and Under	All My Children	Nominated
2012	Young Artist Awards	Best Performance in a TV Series — Recurring Young Actress Ten and Under	Nurse Jackie	Nominated
2012	Young Artist Awards	Best Performance in a Daytime TV Series – Young Actress Ten and Under	All My Children	Nominated
2012	SAG Awards	Outstanding Performance by an ensemble in a comedy series	Nurse Jackie	Nominated
