= Olga Sosnovska =

Polish actress

- Born: 21 May 1972 (age 54); Wieluń, Poland
- Spouse: Sendhil Ramamurthy (m. 1999)
- Children: 2

Olga Sosnovska (born 21 May 1972) is a Polish actress known for her work on television shows such as Spooks and All My Children. She was born in Poland and is based in the United States and the United Kingdom.

== Life and career ==
Sosnovska was born in Wieluń, Poland. Her family immigrated to England when she was eleven. Sosnovska is perhaps best known in the United States for her role as the Polish businesswoman Lena Kundera on the soap opera All My Children. In 2003, her pairing with Bianca Montgomery (portrayed by Eden Riegel), the daughter of Erica Kane, and their subsequent kiss made television history in the US. This was the first ever same-sex kiss in American soap opera history.

In Britain, Sosnovska was known for playing Fiona Carter in series 3–4 of the popular series Spooks, which she left mid-series owing to her first pregnancy in 2005.

She is married to the actor Sendhil Ramamurthy, who is known for his work on the series Heroes. The couple have one daughter and one son. Sosnovska played a small role in a third-season episode of Heroes.

In 2007, Sosnovska played the role of Debbie in Ocean's Thirteen. Her last screen credit was in 2014, when she appeared in two episodes during Season 1 of The Leftovers.

Starting in 2017, and still active as of 2026, Sosnovska plays Jackie in the YouTube series of comedy skits, "Jackie and Lolitia", with British actress Corrinne Wicks as Lolitia.

== Credits ==
- The Vice Season 1, Episode 4 – (Tanya) 1999
- Jason and the Argonauts – (Atalanta) 2000
- Gormenghast – (BBC) 2000
- Monarch of the Glen (Marie-Helene) 2001
- Take Me UK television miniseries (Andrea Patton) 2001
- All My Children ABC soap opera (Lena Kundera) (2002–2004)
- Law & Order season 13, episode 21 "House Calls" (Velida)
- Law & Order: Criminal Intent season 2, episode 14, "Probability" (Jeanne-Marie Lofficier) 2003
- TV commercials for De Beers diamonds 2004 and Thomasville Furniture (voice-over) 2005
- Spooks (Fiona Carter) (2004–2005)
- Criminal Minds season 2, episode 20 – "Honour Amongst Thieves" – (Natalya Chernus)
- Ocean's Thirteen – (Debbie) 2007
- Human Target — (Connie Pucci) 2011
- Weeds – (Zoya) 2011
- The Leftovers (Roxana) 2014

== See also ==
- Lena Kundera and Bianca Montgomery
