= Miranda Montgomery =

- All My Children character
- Denyse Tontz as Miranda Montgomery
- Portrayed by: Haley Evans (2005–2009); Mackenzie Aladjem (2010–2011); Denyse Tontz (2013); (and others)
- Duration: 2004–2011; 2013
- First appearance: March 19, 2004
- Last appearance: September 2, 2013
- Created by: Megan McTavish
- Introduced by: Julie Hanan Carruthers; Ginger Smith (2013)
- Mackenzie Aladjem as Miranda Montgomery

- Haley Evans as Miranda Montgomery
In-universe information
- Other names: Elizabeth "Bess" Miranda Chandler
- Occupation: Student at Pine Valley High School
- Family: Kane
- Parents: Michael Cambias; Bianca Montgomery
- Half-sisters: Gabrielle Montgomery
- Grandparents: Alexander Cambias; Amelia Cambias; Travis Montgomery; Erica Kane
- Uncles: Zach Slater; Josh Madden; Sean Montgomery; Jackson Montgomery; Mark Dalton
- Aunts: Kendall Hart; Molly Montgomery; Christine Montgomery; Silver Kane
- First cousins: Ethan Cambias; Gabrielle Montgomery; Spike Lavery; Ian Slater; Greenlee Smythe; Reggie Montgomery; Lily Montgomery; Julie Rand Chandler
- Other relatives: Eric Kane; Mona Kane Tyler

Miranda Montgomery is a fictional character from the American serial drama, All My Children.

== Casting and characterization ==
On February 19, 2013, it was believed that actress Jordan Lane Price was to be cast as a SORASed Miranda on the Prospect Park's continuation of All My Children, but on February 25, 2013, it was revealed that Denyse Tontz would play Miranda, while Lane plays a brand new character. As an infant, she was portrayed by twin boys, Joseph and Raymond Cartigiano and as a toddler by Haley Evans and as a child by Mackenzie Aladjem. She has been portrayed by Denyse Tontz as a teenaged Miranda in 2013.

The character became the center of one of the most prominent and publicized storylines in soap opera history, detailing the struggle of a mother's fight to come to terms with the loss of her child and the joy of having that child returned to her.

== Storylines ==
Miranda is the daughter of Bianca Montgomery, conceived after a brutal rape by Michael Cambias. The storyline begins when Michael Cambias wants revenge on Bianca's mother, Erica Kane. He soon rapes her youngest daughter. The situation torments Erica, since she too had been raped and impregnated at a young age. Bianca later kills Michael in self-defense after he tries to rape her again.

At first, Erica, fearful of what can happen with Bianca's psyche, urges her to have the child aborted. Bianca agrees to this suggestion at first, but when her older half-sister, Kendall Hart, comes to the clinic, and Bianca tells her what has happened, Kendall is so touched that the sister she always scorned now understands what she went through in being a product of rape, that she throws her full support to Bianca. This solidifies a still unbreakable bond between the two sisters.

Erica finds out about the followed-through pregnancy and is furious that everyone kept her in the dark about it. She and Bianca have a vicious argument concerning this issue, and Bianca storms out of the house. This angers Kendall who unleashes her rage at Erica over her treatment of Bianca.

Miranda is born during a storm where her mother is stranded in a cabin with Babe Carey, one of her mother's best friends. With Babe's help, Miranda is born. Her name is chosen because her mother loves the first name (taken from the Shakespearean play The Tempest), and her middle name comes from her late great-grandmother, Mona Kane Tyler. Although her father is a Cambias, her mother uses her surname, Montgomery, for her daughter's last name.

=== Switched at birth ===
Miranda's first few months are hectic. Far more hectic than they should be. This begins with her mother believing her to be dead due to news from a man named Paul Cramer, but she is not. She has been switched by Paul as he has taken then-wife Babe's son, Adam Chandler III, and passed him off to his sister, Kelly Cramer, back in Llanview, Pennsylvania (home of soap opera One Life to Live). He then presents Miranda to Babe and her husband at the time, JR Chandler, as their own daughter. JR promptly names her Bess, short for Elizabeth Charlotte Chandler.

For months, Bianca is led to believe that her baby has died. In fact, it is Miranda's half-aunt, Kendall, who has to tell Bianca that Miranda is dead. All this time, she is being raised by JR and Babe. Bianca is so shaken by this, that she almost kidnaps her own daughter, not even knowing that the little girl is her child. JR wants Bianca in jail, but Babe intercedes on her behalf, having discovered that Bess is actually Bianca's biological daughter, though she does not tell this to Bianca due to her own personal reasons. She goes so far as to ask Bianca to be Bess' godmother, a situation JR resents. Babe also changes Bess' middle name to Miranda to honor Bianca. JR, on the other hand, is not so pleased about this, and even hires a nanny to watch Bianca when she makes a visit. JR is just as unaware of the truth regarding Bess as Bianca is.

=== Revealed as a Kane and Cambias heir ===
In 2004, Ethan Cambias comes to town. He is Miranda's biological cousin by virtue that Michael is Miranda's father. Ethan's father is Zach Slater, who is really Alexander Cambias, Jr. Ethan befriends Miranda's mother and half-aunt, and later on a DNA test sampled from both Miranda and Ethan shows that they are indeed Cambias blood.

After the death of Paul Cramer, things go awry. It is becoming increasingly evident that people see that Bess Chandler is really Miranda. JR and Babe have split up romantically at this time, and Babe is growing closer to his stepbrother, Jamie Martin. It is during a benefit in Florida that the truth about the baby switch comes out. Babe asks Bianca to come to Florida and she spills everything.

Bianca is clearly livid and slaps and denounces Babe as her friend for her actions. JR, however, is more hell-bent on keeping Miranda away from Bianca than Babe is. He kidnaps Miranda, and while he and Bianca are arguing about the turn of events, she falls off of a second story balcony and is injured severely. Because of these events and the injuries that she suffered, both physical and emotional, JR and the normally compassionate Bianca, who were once close in childhood and adolescence, are now mortal enemies to this day.

JR, hoping against hope that he is Bess's father, has Bianca taken back to Pine Valley, where she is admitted to the hospital. She remains in a coma for several days.

Meanwhile, Erica promptly storms over to JR's father, Adam Chandler, who, incidentally, is one of her ex-husbands, and demands that he set up a DNA test to prove who Bess/Miranda is once and for all. She punctuates this demand by pointedly telling Adam, "Because you will not raise any Kane children in this house!"

Adam, to JR's ire, does exactly what Erica has announced must be done. The results are conclusive and there is no shadow of a doubt. Bess is Miranda and has been very much alive all this time.

JR is not going to let a DNA test result stand in his way of being with his daughter. In his mind, Miranda is Bess and DNA or no DNA, he is the father, and nothing or nobody is going to stop that.

One person, however, does eventually stop that — JR's stepfather, Tad Martin.

Tad, along with Adam, Jackson Montgomery (Bianca's uncle), Aidan Devane, and Erica, take Miranda out of JR's arms and return her to the hospital. A truly depressed and furious JR denounces everyone for what has happened. He takes to drinking and mourns the loss of both his son and his daughter.

A very relieved Erica takes her granddaughter and brings her into Bianca's ICU room. Erica, along with Kendall, her uncle (and later stepfather), Jackson, her best friend (and later girlfriend), Maggie Stone, and many people who love her, plead for her to come out of her coma.

Erica tries to awaken Bianca from her coma by having Miranda around her.

When Erica puts Miranda into Bianca's arms, it is a Christmas miracle indeed. Bianca wakes up and holds her beautiful baby girl close to her heart. Ethan, who is there when she is brought in, meets his cousin as Bianca is already forming a bond with her.

Many weeks later, Miranda, along with her mother and Maggie, move to Paris, where Bianca works at Cambias Industries' European Division. While there, Maggie becomes like a mother to Miranda and Miranda thinks of Maggie as another mother. It is inferred by Bianca to Julia Santos that adoption papers have been drawn up, never signed, but that Miranda does not need the adoption papers to love Maggie as a mother.

Since she and her cousin, Ethan, are Cambias by blood, they stand to be heirs to the Cambias fortune at that time. Because of Miranda's age, however, Bianca votes Miranda's shares in Cambias Industries by proxy. Now that her cousin, Ethan, is dead, she will be the sole heir to the Cambias fortune. When she is of age, she will take her rightful place in the Cambias Empire. Though her double cousin Ian Slater and her maternal half-sister/paternal cousin Gabrielle Montgomery are also heirs both through her uncle Zach Slater. As well as possibility of Spike Lavery maybe an heir because he is the stepson, but raised by Zach Slater; and his father was the owner of Cambias Industries for a few years and still has part of the shares for Cambias Industries.

In 2006, Miranda returns alongside her mother to Pine Valley, where she meets her new half-uncle, Josh Madden (it is revealed that Maggie has cheated on Bianca while in Paris). At present, Miranda is a happy and healthy little girl, who has thrived, in spite of the drama that surrounded her when she was a baby. While back, she gains friends in Kathy Mershon and Emma Lavery, and she gets along wonderfully with her half-cousin, Spike Lavery. She also makes friends with Zoe, who happens to be her half-uncle Josh's roommate. She gets along well with her great-uncle and surrogate grandfather, Jackson Montgomery, as well.

On April 26, 2007, Miranda moves back to Paris with her mother. Bianca cites the fact that Miranda has friends in Paris and that they had a life there that she wants them to get back to. This may bring about a reconciliation between Bianca and Maggie, who returned to Paris in February, both of whom considered themselves a family with Miranda prior to fall of 2006.

While away from Pine Valley, it is also discovered that Miranda's cousin once removed, Greenlee Smythe, stole her Fusion Stock that she inherited from Simone Torres (there is debate now concerning this, as Simone possibly willed only the actual Trust Fund left to her by her fiancé, Ethan Cambias, to Miranda and possibly held out the Fusion shares to give to Greenlee. There is no proof that the shares were stolen from Miranda or if Miranda actually ever had control of the Fusion stock to begin with).

=== Return ===
In October 2008, Miranda returns to town with a pregnant Bianca and her fiancée. As Bianca once again gives birth to a baby girl during a storm, it is revealed that Zach is baby Gabrielle's father, making her Miranda's cousin and half-sister.

Miranda was part of her mother's wedding to Reese Williams. She also danced with them during their first dance. When the marriage fell apart, Miranda went back to Paris with her mother and sister.

=== Second return to Pine Valley ===
When her mother returned to Pine Valley, Bianca said that she did not bring her daughters back with her because of Erica being missing. Jackson Montgomery has Miranda and Gabby flown to Pine Valley after Erica is back. Miranda, Gabby, and Bianca are living at Wildwind along with Caleb Cooney, their late friend, Palmer Cortlandt's.

=== Teenage years ===
On April 29, 2013, Miranda is shown to be aged up, along with AJ, due to the five year jump. She has not learned that she was result of rape from Bianca, but was rather told that she was a test tube baby with an unknown father. She and AJ are best friends, but she is clueless that he has feelings for her. Miranda and AJ share a kiss, but she pulls away and leaves.
