= Michael Cambias =

- All My Children character
- Portrayed by: William deVry
- Duration: 2003–2004, 2006
- First appearance: January 23, 2003
- Last appearance: January 31, 2006
- Created by: Gordon Rayfield
- Introduced by: Jean Dadario Burke
In-universe information
- Other names: Michael Kinsey
- Occupation: CEO of Cambias Industries
- Parents: Alexander Cambias; Amelia Cambias
- Brothers: Zach Slater
- Children: Miranda Montgomery
- Nieces and nephews: Ethan Cambias; Ian Slater; Gabrielle Montgomery

Michael Cambias is a fictional character in the American daytime drama All My Children. He was portrayed by actor William deVry, from January 23, 2003 to August 29, 2003, and as ghostly visions from September 23 to 26, 2003; October 9, 2003; November 11 and 13, 2003; December 3, 2003; January 16 to 23, 2004; February 16, 20, and 26, 2004; September 7, 14, and 15, 2004; and January 27 to 31, 2006.

The character is one that lives in infamy due to the controversial rape storyline of All My Children heroine Bianca Montgomery. The event became one of the most debated topics within the soap opera medium and was nicknamed "Voldemort", a title coined by Television Without Pity message board members to mean "the storyline that shall not be named."

== Storyline ==
Character Michael Cambias is primarily remembered for raping Erica Kane's lesbian daughter, Bianca Montgomery. His background shows him to be the spoiled, wealthy, and extremely arrogant son of Alexander Cambias, Sr. (later known as the Satin Slayer). He comes to Pine Valley with business partner Lena Kundera in a failed attempt to take over several prominent Pine Valley businesses, including Chandler Enterprises, Cortlandt Enterprises, Enchantment and Fusion Cosmetics.

On a gloomy, rainy and thunderous night when the power is out in all houses of Pine Valley, Michael breaks into the boarding house Bianca resides at and rapes her to get back at Kendall and Erica for ruining his plans. Michael is later charged with raping Bianca, but to the community's utter disgust, he is acquitted due to a lack of physical evidence (an angry Lena even goes so far as to almost attack him after the acquittal). His after-trial gloating, wherein he states that he "owns Pine Valley, and everybody in it," angers nearly everyone in hearing range and Jackson Montgomery, Bianca's uncle, warns Cambias's attorney to get him out of the courtroom, before the crowd becomes a lynch mob. Eventually, he is found dead in a freezer outside of Pine Valley.

His funeral is attended by most everyone who cares for Bianca, and their "eulogies" are laced with anger and hatred toward him. Lena even goes so far as to spit on his grave. His final resting place, fittingly enough, is in the city dump; Tad Martin had earlier stolen Michael's body from the funeral home and filled the empty casket with rocks before throwing the body in the garbage.

Though Kendall is initially the prime suspect in the murder, it is later revealed to be Bianca. Bianca had earlier confronted Michael and shot him to death in self-defense when he attempted to rape her again, but she repressed her memories of the event. When she recalls killing Michael and confesses, the judge who believed Bianca's story all along, leans hard on the prosecution not to file any charges against her.

Eventually, it was discovered that when Bianca was raped, he impregnated her. She eventually gave birth to a daughter, named Miranda. Although Michael is her father, Bianca gave Miranda the last name Montgomery.

== Specific character detail ==
Character Michael Cambias was born on May 25, 1969. The writers had him die of a fatal injury sustained after a gunshot wound to the abdomen by Bianca Montgomery on August 28, 2003.

=== Victims ===
Name	Attack
Kendall Hart	Attempted to rape her twice
Erica Kane	Attempted rape
Bianca Montgomery	Raped; tried to rape a second time
Lena Kundera	Assault
Maggie Stone	Assault
Greenlee Smythe	Attempted Assault
