= List of All My Children characters =

Here is a list of characters who have appeared on the ABC Daytime and TOLN soap opera All My Children.

== A ==
=== Carter Anders ===
- Jason Pendergraft (2013)

Pine Valley Hospital doctor with an unknown past.

=== Bill Anderson ===
- James Pritchett (1989)

=== Dr. Russ Anderson ===
- David Pendleton (1978–79)
- Charles Brown (1979–80)

Pine Valley physician who was attracted to nurse Caroline Dixon Grant. Rival of Dr. Franklin Grant.

=== Gillian Andrassy (deceased) ===
- Esta TerBlanche (1997–2001, 2011)

Hungarian princess, married to Jake Martin and Ryan Lavery. Initially, a spoiled and arrogant young lady who clashed with both Kelsey Martin and Hayley Vaughn-Santos, Gillian eventually matured into a much kinder and compassionate woman, due to her marriage to Jake Martin. She was murdered in a botched attempt on the life of Anna Devane in 2001 (resulting in the donation of her heart to Laura Kirk-English). Appeared as a ghost to Ryan in 2011 to assure him that she was not David's last Project Orpheus patient.

=== Maida Andrews ===
- Pamela Blair (1985)

=== Steve Andrews ===
- Nicolas Coster (1988–89)

Travis Montgomery's kidnapper.

=== Chase Archibald ===
- Zachary Spicer (2010)

== B ==
=== Laurel Banning (deceased) ===
- Kristen Jensen (1992–93)
- Felicity LaFortune (1993–96)

Reformed con artist who was married to Denny Benton, Jackson Montgomery and Trevor Dillon. Mother of Lily, who was adopted by Jackson. Had a gay brother, Michael Delaney. Died after she was shot on the set of a talk show.

=== Tony Barclay ===
- Brent Barrett (1983–84)

Model who worked in NY for Olga Swenson. Engaged to (and madly in love with) Jenny Gardner before her reconciliation and marriage to Greg. Accidentally killed Jenny with a bomb intended for Greg. Brother of Judy Barclay.

=== Lucas Barnes ===
- Richard Lawson (1992–94)

African-American businessman. Husband of Vivienne Taylor Roxbury. Stepfather of Taylor Roxbury-Cannon. Biological father of Terrence Frye.

=== Angie Baxter ===
- Debbi Morgan (1982–90, 2008–11, 2013)
- Saundra Quarterman (1990–91)

Daughter of Pat and Les Baxter. Best friend to Jenny Gardner. Married to Jesse Hubbard. Doctor at Pine Valley Hospital. Mother of Frankie Hubbard. Sexually harassed by Dr. Voight. Became a surgeon.

=== Les Baxter (deceased) ===
- Antonio Fargas (1982–83, 1987)

Lawyer and crime lord known as "Mr. Big" and father of Angie Hubbard. Openly hostile to Angie's relationship with Jesse Hubbard, since he thought Jesse was not good enough for his daughter. Formerly married to Pat Baxter, he died after being shot by Jesse in self defense.

=== Pat Baxter ===
- Lee Chamberlin (1982–90)

Social worker, mother of Angie Hubbard and formerly married to Les Baxter. Left Pine Valley shortly after Angie and Frankie left for California.

=== Donna Beck Tyler ===
- Francesca Poston (1976)
- Candice Earley (1976–93, 1995)

Former prostitute and adoptive mother of Emily Ann Sago Martin. Her relationship with Chuck Tyler antagonizes Chuck's grandmother, Phoebe Tyler. Married to Chuck Tyler, Palmer Cortlandt, Benny Sago and Chuck Tyler (again). Sister of Mitch Beck. She was romantically involved with Tom Cudahy and Ross Chandler.

=== Ben ===
- Emerson Brooks (2011)

Erica Kane's kidnapper who worked with Jane, a woman determined to take over Erica's life.

=== Vanessa Bennett (deceased) ===
- Marj Dusay (1999–2002)

The mother of David Hayward, Trey Kenyon and Leo du Pres, she comes to town to reconcile with her estranged son, David and interfere in his romance with Erica Kane; who's she hates for being raped and impregnated by her former lover, Richard Fields. Marrying Palmer Cortlandt after a brief courtship, but her infidelity impacts the marriage. Revealed as the drug lord Proteus, she seems to have multiple personalities. Dies after a fight with Leo over control of the gun, falling 100 feet to her death at Millers Falls; when she holds Greenlee Smythe hostage.

=== Ava Benton ===
- Leven Rambin (2007–08)

Paternal half-sister of Lily Montgomery, she was engaged to Jonathan Lavery and leaves Pine Valley to move to California in pursuit of her dream of acting and modeling.

=== Denny Benton (deceased) ===
- Kale Browne (1993)

A career criminal formerly married to Laurel Banning and father of Lily (who was adopted by Jackson) and Ava Benton. Killed in self-defense by his ex-wife Laurel with a decanter.

=== Madison Beardsley ===
- Stephanie Gatschet (2009–11)

Widow (and murderer) of Henry North, she allowed Randi to think that she killed him. After she conceived a child in a relationship with Ryan Lavery, Ryan left her for Greenlee. Madison then began a relationship with Scott Chandler after his release from prison. After a difficult pregnancy she gave birth 12 weeks early in May 2011 to Sarah Lavery, who died of pneumonia a few days later. Traumatized by the death, she has not recovered.

=== Carl Blair, Jr. ===
Adopted son of Frank Grant and Nancy Grant Blair (who was married to the late Carl Blair in an interracial marriage) at the time of his birth. He later moved with Chicago with his mother and stepfather. He became a physician.

=== Carl Blair, Sr. ===
- Stephen James (1976)

Husband of Nancy Grant Blair and adoptive father of Carl Blair Jr.

=== Belle Bodelle ===
- Kathy Bates (1983)

Erica Kane's rough-and-tumble prison roommate when Erica was convicted of killing Kent Bogard.

=== Brian Bodine ===
- Gregory Gordon (1990–91)
- Matt Borlenghi (1991–93, 1996)
- Brian Lane Green (1993–94)

Former love interest of Hayley Vaughan, and adopted by Myrtle Fargate after his brother (and legal guardian) Trask Bodine left Pine Valley. Briefly married to An Li Chen and Dixie Cooney.

=== Trask Bodine ===
- Matt Servitto (1989–90)

Brian Bodine's brother and legal guardian until he left Pine Valley.

=== Charlie Brent ===
- Ian Washam (1972–76)
- Brian Lima (1976–81)
- Josh Hamilton (1985)
- Robert Duncan McNeill (1986–88)
- Charles Van Eman (1990–91)
- Christopher Lawford (1992–96)

Philip Charles Brent Jr. (first named Charles Philip Tyler), firstborn grandson of Joe and Ruth, son of Tara and Phil and originally believed to be Chuck Tyler's son. Dated Julie Rand and, later, Haley Vaughn. Became engaged to Erica Kane (who had been his stepmother). Married to Cecily, with two children.

=== Phil Brent (deceased) ===
- Richard Hatch (1970–72)
- Nick Benedict (1973–79, 1988)
- Jordan Charney (temporary replacement in 1975)

Adopted son of Ruth and her late husband, Ted Brent. A Vietnam vet, he was Charlie's biological father. He had an affair with Tara Martin, later marrying her. Later married Erica Kane and remarried Tara. He returned from Viet Nam wanted to be a park ranger. He had a one-night stand with Claudette Flax Montgomery. Died in 1981 when his plane exploded, and was called Philip Brent Sr. because of his son with Tara.

=== Grayson Brown ===
- Kevin Merill Wilson (2002)

=== Bo Buchanan ===
- Robert S. Woods (2004–05)

Crossover appearance from One Life to Live.

=== Duke Buchanan ===
- Matthew Metzger (2005)

Crossover appearance from One Life to Live.

=== Kevin Buchanan ===
- Dan Gauthier (2004–05)

Crossover appearance from One Life to Live.

== C ==
=== Alexander Cambias, Sr. ===
- Ronald Guttman (2003–09)

Father of Zach (born Alexander Jr.) and Michael and married to Amelia, he faked his death. After terrorizing Pine Valley as the Satin Slayer killer, he is in prison.

=== Amelia Cambias (Deceased) ===
- Claire Byrne (2007–11, in flashbacks)

Mother of Zach (born Alexander Jr.) and Michael and married to Alexander Sr., she had an affair with Raymond Jerkins and was pushed from a balcony to her death by her husband.

=== Ethan Cambias (Deceased) ===
- James Scott (2004–06)

Raised by Stanley and Edith Ramsey and the biological son of Zach Slater and Hannah Nichols, he was engaged to Simone Torres. He died in the Mardi Gras Ball explosion caused by Janet Dillon.

=== Michael Cambias (Deceased) ===
- William deVry (2003–04, 2006)

Killed by Bianca in self-defense, he fathered Miranda Montgomery in an act of rape and was the brother of Zach, uncle of Ethan and the son of Alexander Cambias Sr. and Amelia.

=== Taylor Roxbury-Cannon ===
- Ingrid Rogers (1992–95)
- Kelli Taylor (1995–96)

Taylor came to Pine Valley with her step-father, Lucas Barnes (Richard Lawson). But this was unknown for a while, allowing Taylor to introduce herself to people as Ashley and coming off like a spoiled teen. She began a combative flirtation with Terrence Frye, Lucas' biological son, with Terrence being unaware of her connection to his father. Eventually, things get sorted out and Taylor and Terrence become part of the same circle of friends that included Hayley, Brian, and An Li. She and Terrence later become an official couple. After high school, Taylor became a police officer at odds with her wealthy Chicago background and debutante persona. Undercover for the Pine Valley Police Department, she posed as a European-American to break up the racist gang and the White Acres real estate sub-division. Taylor was eventually followed to town by her mother (Vivienne Taylor Roxbury). Taylor became obsessed with Noah Keefer and framed him for the murder of Louie Greco. After her attempt to murder Julia Santos, she was arrested.

=== Jenny Carey ===
- Ashley and Thomas (2007)
- Jacqueline and Rebecca Levine (2007–08)
- Jessica and Rachael Slomovitz (2008–09)
- Devon Woods (2010)
- Darby Jo Hart (2010–11)

The daughter of Krystal Carey Chandler and Tad Martin, she was born April 11, 2007, at Chandler Mansion with the help of Krystal's step-daughter Colby Chandler. Named after Tad's late sister Jenny, she is the half-sister of Babe, Marissa, Jamie and Kathy and the goddaughter of Jamie Martin and Colby Chandler.

=== Paolo Caselli ===
- Joseph Barbara (2000)

=== Cara Castillo ===
- Amanda Hall Roger (2003)
- Lindsay Hartley (2010–11, 2013)

A Doctors Without Borders physician, she came to town using the alias Carolyn Finn. Sister of Griffin Castillo, formerly married to Jake Martin and married to Tad Martin, as of September 2011 she was pregnant with David Hayward's baby. In 2013, it was revealed that she had a son named Oliver, but lied to David that she had aborted their child.

=== Griffin Castillo ===
- Jordi Vilasuso (2010–11, 2013)

A cardiologist who came to town to expand the Miranda Center with Zach Slater, his mentor was David Hayward. He is Cara Castillo's brother.

=== Adam Chandler ===
- David Canary (1983–2011, 2013)

A villainous multi-billionaire from Pigeon Hollow; he is the twin brother of Stuart Chandler and sister of Charlotte (Lottie) Chandler (mother of Ross), and has been married 11 times, to: Althea Patterson, Brooke English, Erica Kane, Liza Colby (three times), Dixie Cooney, Gloria Marsh, Natalie Marlowe (marriage invalid), Krystal Carey, Arlene Vaughan, and Annie Lavery. The father of Skye (Antoinette), Colby (with Liza), Hayley Vaughan Santos (with Arlene), Adam "J.R." Chandler Jr. (with Dixie), and Anna Claire (with Gloria). His address was 300 River Road, Pine Valley, Pennsylvania 19101.

=== Krystal Carey Chandler ===
- Bobbie Eakes (2003–11)

Although her real name is Hazel, she renamed herself Krystal because she liked the character Krystle Carrington on Dynasty. She is Babe, Marissa and Jenny's mother; formerly married Adam Chandler, Tad Martin and David Hayward, she is currently single.

=== Adam "J.R." Chandler Jr ===
- Charlotte and Margaret Baughman (1989–92)
- Kevin Alexander (1992–96)
- Jesse McCartney (1998–2001)
- Jonathan Bennett (2001–02)
- Andrew Ridings (2002–03)
- Jacob Young (2003–11)
- Ryan Bittle (2013)

The son of Adam and Dixie, J.R. married Babe Carey three times (although one marriage was invalid). Also married to Babe's twin sister, Marissa Tasker, whom Krystal sold at birth. Father of Adam Chandler III, as of January 2011 his cancer was in remission. Murdered Marissa Tasker, he was shot by David Hayward and in a coma for five years.

=== Adam "AJ" Chandler III ===
- Aidan and Liam O'Donnell (2004–05)
- Jarred Sturman and Shane Passaro (alternating) (2005–08)
- Rory and Declan McTigue (2008–10)
- Tate Berney (2010–11)
- Eric Nelsen (2013)

The son of J.R. Chandler and Babe Carey, he is the nephew (and adopted son) of Marissa Tasker.

=== Annie Chandler ===
- Melissa Claire Egan (2006–11)

Divorced from Terry McDermott, Ryan Lavery, Adam Chandler, and Scott Chandler. She is the mother of Emma Lavery (with Ryan).

=== Babe Carey Chandler (Deceased) ===
- Alexa Havins (2003–07, 2011)
- Amanda Baker (2007–09)

The daughter of David Hayward and Krystal Carey, she is Marissa Tasker's twin sister. Although her birth name is Arabella, she has not used it since her mother called her "Babe" because she was her little baby doll. Her marriage to Paul Cramer was annulled, and she was married several times to J.R. Chandler. The mother of Adam Chandler III, she died of injuries sustained in a tornado in October 2008 and appeared to J.R. as a ghost on September 21, 2011.

=== Charlotte "Lottie" Chandler (Deceased) ===
The sister of Adam and Stuart Chandler and mother of Ross Chandler, soon after his birth she committed suicide with a gun.

=== Colby Chandler ===
- Carson Weaver and Jordan Petruziello (1999)
- Carson Grace Levine (2000)
- Brianne and Morgan Mullen (2000)
- Kathryn Newton (2002–04)
- Abby Wathen (2002)
- Ambyr Childers (2006–08)
- Brianne Moncrief (2008–09)
- Natalie Hall (2009–11)
- Brooke Newton (2013)

Daughter of Adam Chandler and Liza Colby.

=== Julie Rand Chandler ===
- Stephanie Winters (1985–86)
- Lauren Holly (1986–89)

Biological daughter of Mark Dalton and Elizabeth Carlyle and niece of Erica Kane. Adopted by Ross and Ellen Tucker Chandler, although she was romantically involved with Charlie Brent she ended up marrying reformed mobster Nico Kelly, but the marriage didn't last and Julie left town.

=== Ross Chandler ===
- Robert Gentry (1985–90)

Nephew of Adam and Stuart and son of Charlotte "Lottie" Chandler and Palmer Cortlandt, he was the ex-husband of Cynthia Preston and Ellen Dalton. After his release from prison for raping Natalie Hunter, he left town.

=== Scott Chandler ===
- Philip Amelio (1987–91)
- Shane McDermott (1995–96)
- Daniel Cosgrove (1996–98, 2010–11)
- Forbes March (1999–2000)
- Adam Mayfield (2009–10)

Adopted son of Stuart Chandler and biological son of Cindy Parker, he was the ex-husband of Annie Novak.

=== Skye Chandler ===
- Antoinette Byron (1986–87)
- Robin Christopher (1987–91, 2000)
- Carrie Genzel (1996–97)

Raised as the natural daughter of Dr. Alan Quartermaine and Gretel Cummings, adopted daughter of Adam Chandler and his first wife, Althea Patterson, her adoption was discovered to be illegal. She was the granddaughter of Myrtle Lum Fargate. She came to Pine Valley to sing at The Cheateau and to find Adam Chandler. She and Tom Cuddahy were later married and divorced. She helped Erica and Janet.

=== Stuart Chandler ===
- David Canary (1984–2009, 2011)

Twin brother of Adam, a local artist married to Marian Colby, he was previously married to Joanna Yeager and Cindy Parker and is the adoptive father of Scott (Cindy's son). Supposedly shot to death on May 18, 2009, but was revealed to be alive on September 21, 2011.

=== An Li Chen ===
- Irene Ng (1991)
- Lindsay Price (1991–93)

Former wife of Brian Bodine.

=== Alma Chin ===
- Karen Tsin Lee (2003)

=== Henry Chin ===
- Ivan Shaw (2003)

Maggie's former boyfriend, whose family operated an Asian restaurant and wanted him to become a doctor. After leaving his pre-med studies, he lives in Myrtle's boarding house and begins a career as a musician. Unable to rekindle his relationship with Maggie, he joins a band. When he leaves Pine Valley to go on tour, they part amicably.

=== Jeff Cohen ===
- Nick Gregory (1996)

Doctor

=== Liza Colby ===
- Marcy Walker (1981–84, 1995–2005)
- Alice Haining (1984)
- Jamie Luner (2009–11)

Daughter of Marian and Larry Colby. She was spiteful and vindictive towards Jenny Gardner and Jesse Hubbard. She had a romantic liaison with Tad Martin until he slept with her mother, and fell in love with Cliff Warner before leaving town. Returned to town a television producer, she married Adam Chandler three times, having a daughter, Colby.

=== Marian Colby Chandler ===
- Jennifer Bassey (1983–89, 1995–2009, 2011)

Liza's mother, who had an affair with Tad Martin while he was dating Liza and she was married to Larry Colby. She was released from prison for the 1985 murder of Zach Grayson in less than a year, continuing her career as a real-estate broker and helping set Tad up in business. Scheming against Liza and Adam, Marian slept with Stuart (who she thought was Adam) and fell in love with him and they married. After Stuart's murder in 2009, she had a breakdown and entered the Oak Haven mental-health facility.

=== Henry Collins ===
- Bruce Kirkpatrick (2000)

Father of Ricky and a 15-year police officer.

=== Ricky Collins ===
- Tim Duffe (2000)

Henry's son, a troubled teen runaway.

=== Matt Connolly ===
- Michael Tylo (1986–88)
- Steve Fletcher (1989)

Briefly married to Nina Warner. Old friend of Jeremy Hunter.

=== Ceara Connor (Deceased) ===
- Genie Francis (1990–92)

A niece of Myrtle Fargate. Moved to Pine Valley to work as a fundraiser for Pine Valley University. A con artist and incest victim, married to Jeremy Hunter until her death after being shot.

=== Andy Conway ===
- Fred Berman (2007)

=== Caleb Cooney ===
- Michael Nouri (2010–11)

Pete Cooney's (Palmer Cortlandt) nephew, he was attracted to Erica and helped her after her plane crashed.

=== Dixie Cooney Martin ===
- Kari Gibson (1988)
- Cady McClain (1988–96, 1998–2002, 2005–08, 2010–11, 2013)

Palmer's niece, married to Adam Chandler, Tad Martin, Craig Lawson and Brian Bodine, Dixie and Tad later remarried. She is the mother of J.R. (with Adam) and Kathy (with Tad). After supposedly dying on January 30, 2007, after eating tainted pancakes, she returned several times as an angel and was revealed to be alive on May 17, 2011.

=== Daisy Cortlandt ===
- Gillian Spencer (1980–88, 1995, 2010)

Twice divorced from Palmer and presumed dead for many years, she is the mother of Nina Cortlandt Warner and daughter of Myra Murdock Sloan. Returned to town using the alias Monique Jonvil to befriend her daughter before the truth came out.

=== Lanie Cortlandt Rampal ===
- Paige Turco (1988–91)

Born Della Cooney, her full name was Melanie Cortlandt. Sister of Dixie Cooney and the late Will Cortlandt, she is the half-sister of the late Di and Del Henry. The niece of Palmer Cortlandt, she is married to David Rampal.

=== Nina Cortlandt ===
- Taylor Miller (1979–84, 1986–88, 1989, 1995, 1996, 2010)
- Heather Stanford (1984–85)
- Barbara Kearns (1985–86)

Palmer's daughter with Daisy, whom he had told Nina was dead. Married to Dr. Cliff Warner, she is the adoptive mother of Bobby Warner and the biological mother of Michael Warner. Formerly married to Matthew Connolly, and once in love with Benjamin Sago.

=== Opal Cortlandt ===
- Dorothy Lyman (1981–83)
- Jill Larson (1989–2011, 2013)

Mother of Tad Martin, Jenny Gardner, Peter Cortlandt and Adrian Sword and ex-wife of Ray Gardner, Ralph Purdy and Palmer Cortland, she had a short lived affair with Langley Wallingford while working as a servant for his wife, Phoebe.

=== Palmer Cortlandt (Deceased) ===
- James Mitchell (1979–2008, 2010)

Industrialist formerly married to Daisy, Donna Beck, Cynthia Preston, Natalie Hunter, Opal Gardner and Vanessa Bennett. The father of Ross, Nina and Peter and uncle to Dixie, Lanie, Will, and Caleb. Frequently meddled in his families' lives until his death in 2010 of a heart attack.

=== Pete Cortlandt ===
- Jack McKillop (1997–99)
- Casey Gunther (1999–2002)
- Daniel Kennedy (2008–09)
- Robert Scott Wilson (2013)

Born to Palmer and Opal Cortlandt on Christmas Eve 1992, Peter was a difficult youth with an unrequited love for Colby Chandler. He conspired with Palmer's long-time enemy Adam Chandler to taint perfume. Peter returned to Pine Valley for a visit with Opal; although he is reluctant to stay, he changes his mind after an encounter with Celia Fitzgerald.

In February 2013, it was announced that Peter was recast with Robert Scott Wilson as part of Prospect Park's series reboot. Wilson debuted on April 29, 2013, and his performance has been critically praised. Omar White-Nobles of TVSource Magazine called Pete and Celia's relationship a series high point: "Jordan Lane Price and Rob Wilson have good, natural chemistry. I could see them turning into something big."

=== Will Cortlandt (Deceased) ===
- Lonnie Quinn (1988–89)
- James Patrick Stuart (1989–92)

Dixie's brother, married to Hayley, was murdered by Janet Green with a crowbar.

=== Leslie Coulson ===
- Colleen Dion (1999–2001)

An attorney who had affairs with David and Tad, she is in a mental institution for treatment.

=== Amanda Cousins ===
- Amanda Bearse (1981–84)

Best friend of Liza Colby, and briefly engaged to Greg Nelson.

=== Sean Cudahy ===
- Alan Dysert (1980–81)

Brother of Tom Cudahy, son of Rose Cudahy. Hired to work in the bank by Harland Tucker. Had an affair with Harlan's daughter Devon Shepherd McFadden. Conspired with Palmer to break up Cliff and Nina, and murdered Sybil Thorne. Later dated Skye.

=== Tom Cudahy ===
- Richard Shoberg (1977–98, 2004–05)

Former professional football player and brother of Sean Cudahy, he owned the Goal Post and Panache. The father of Laura Cudahy and Jamal (adopted with Livia), he was married to Erica, Brooke, Skye, Barbara, and Livia.

=== Gretel Rae Cummings ===
- Linda Dano (1999–2000)

Mother of Skye Chandler Quartermaine and daughter of Myrtle Fargate. The character originally was introduced on One Life to Live in the 1980s.

== D ==
=== Ellen Dalton ===
- Kathleen Noone (1977–89, 1995)

Arriving as Ellen Shepherd with her teenage daughter Devon, she married Mark Dalton (twice) and Ross Chandler and had a romance with Paul Martin. Nick Davis hired her to work at The Chateau. She later became the manager. She later owned The Boutique. She was friends with Freddy and Erica. She adopted Julie Rand. She was the grandmother of Bonnie McFadden, a special friend to Stuart Chandler and a child movie star.

=== Mark Dalton ===
- Mark LaMura (1977–89, 1994–95, 2004–05)

Erica's half-brother, he married Ellen Shepherd twice and is the father of Julie (Rand) Chandler.

=== Bitsy Davidson ===
- Ann Flood (1987–90)

Friend of Phoebe Wallingford and mother of Cecily Davidson, she flirted with Sean Cudahy and Dr. Cliff Warner.

=== Cecily Davidson Brent ===
- Rosa Langschwadt Nevin (1986–96)

Daughter of Bitsy Davidson, she married and divorced Nico Kelly and later married Charlie Brent.

=== Nick Davis ===
- Larry Keith (1970–78, 1983, 1988–05)

Father of Phil Brent and on-and-off lover of Erica, he was formerly married to Ann Tyler and Kitty Shea.

=== Alice Dawson ===
- Janet Hubert (1999)

=== Frank Dawson ===
- Frankie Faison (1998–99)

had once been in affair with Opal Gardner Courtlandt which resulted in the birth of their son.

=== Michael Delaney ===
- Chris Bruno (1995–97)

Laurel Banning Dillon's brother, a gay teacher at PVHS. Laura Kirk, Anita Santos, Scott Chandler and Bobby Warner were in his history class.

=== Aidan Devane ===
- Aiden Turner (2002–09)
- Tom Archdeacon (2004, temporary replacement)

Anna's nephew, who romances Kendall, Anita, Erin and Di. Formerly married to Greenlee, he is imprisoned after kidnapping Kendall and becoming a fugitive.

=== Alexandra Devane ===
- Finola Hughes (1999–2001)

Anna's twin sister, she was once married to Dimitri.

=== Anna Devane ===
- Finola Hughes (2001–03)

Former police chief of Port Charles and Pine Valley, she is the mother of Robin Scorpio and the late Leora Hayward and the ex-wife of Robert Scorpio (twice), Duke Lavery and David Hayward.

=== Charlotte Devane (deceased) ===
- Samantha Eggar (2000–01)

International crime lord and supposed mother of Alexandra Devane Marick (later proven the step-sister of Alex's real mother), she had influence from prison. However, a hit man sent to kill Anna Devane accidentally killed Gillian and Charlotte died in prison of a stroke.

=== Gabriel Devane ===
- Eric Dearborn (2001)

Half-brother of Anna and Alex Devane, he was imprisoned in a cage by Charlotte Devane for several years and had a brief romance with Rosa Santos before leaving for Budapest to live with Alex and Dimitri.

=== Charlie Dibble ===
- Richard Robichaux (2004)

=== Amanda Dillon ===
- Brett and Kevin Salvaggio (1992)
- Julia and Leigh Pikus (1992–94)
- Phoebe Cutter (1994–95)
- Alexis Manta (1996–2000)
- Chrishell Stause (2005–11)

Biological daughter of Trevor Dillon and Janet Green (later Dillon). Adopted by Natalie Dillon at birth while her mother was in prison. Married Jake Martin and mother of Trevor Martin.

=== Janet Marlowe Green Dillon ===
- Kate Collins (1991–92, 2005–07, 2010–11)
- Melody Anderson (1993)
- Robin Mattson (1994–2000)

Natalie's mentally ill sister and wife of Trevor Dillon terrorizes Pine Valley as Janet Green, is the mother of Amanda Dillon and the grandmother of Trevor Martin. AKA "Janet from another planet" and Jane Cox in 1994–95. Murdered Will Cortlandt and Trevor Dillon.

=== Natalie Dillon (deceased) ===
- Kate Collins (1985–92, 1997–98, 2001)
- Melody Anderson (1992–93)

Former nurse and wife of Alex Hunter, Jeremy Hunter, Palmer Cortlandt and Adam Chandler, she was married to Trevor Dillon at her death. The mother of Tim Dillon and the adoptive mother of Amanda Dillon, she was romantically involved with Ross Chandler (who raped her) and died in an automobile accident. She and Donna became best friends as well as neighbors.

=== Tim Dillon ===
- Michael Shulman (1989–91)
- Tommy J. Michaels (1990–99)
- Dylan Fergus (2002)

Natalie's son with Alex Hunter, who was later adopted by Trevor.

=== Trevor Dillon (deceased) ===
- David Jordan (1989)
- James Kiberd (1989–2000)

Former detective and husband of Natalie, Laurel and Janet, brother of Arlene Vaughan, uncle of Hayley Vaughan, adoptive father of Tim Dillon, father of Amanda Dillon and grandfather of Trevor Martin, he was murdered by his wife Janet with a crowbar and his body placed in a freezer in the psychotic hope of thawing him out. Amanda named her son after Trevor.

=== Raquel Dion Santos ===
- Carolyn Neff (1998–99)
- Ara Celi (1999)

First wife of Mateo Santos, and mother of Max.

=== Eddie Dorrance ===
- Ross Petty (1978)
- Warren Burton (1978–79)

Manager of singer Kelly Cole who got her addicted to drugs. He raped Brooke English, which resulted in her pregnancy and abortion. He was hated by Lincoln, Myrtle, Phoebe and almost everyone else. He was friends with Langley. He was later murdered by Claudette Flax Montgomery.

=== Allie Doyle ===
- Alla Korot (1997–98)

Former lover of David Hayward and wife of Dr. Joey Martin, after faking her medical credentials she left to attend medical school.

=== Leo du Pres (deceased) ===
- Josh Duhamel (1999–2002, 2011)

Half-brother of David Hayward, he was married to Laura and Greenlee and fell 100 feet to his death with Vanessa from Miller's Falls as a result of him and Vanessa fighting for control of the gun when Vanessa held Greenlee hostage. Although David Hayward taunted Greenlee that Leo was still alive, he only appeared to her as a vision.

=== Maureen Duvall ===
- Lisa Lord (1999)

== E ==
=== Agnes Eckhardt ===
- Agnes Nixon (2005, 2008, 2010–11)

A longtime board member of Pine Valley Hospital, she persuaded Joe Martin to move from California to work at PVU. First appearing at Dr. Martin's 35th anniversary celebration, she later appeared at Phoebe Tyler Wallingford's funeral and was seen briefly at Myrtle Fargate's 2008 funeral. In 2011, she used her influence to get Cara Castillo a green card.

=== Corrine Edgar ===
- Jill Andre (1979)

Kelly's cellmate

=== Jane Ekley ===
- Virginia McKinsie (1980s)

Registered nurse.

=== Evan Elkhorn ===
- Evan Ferrante (1996)

=== Rae Ella ===
- Kathleen Chalfant (1994)

=== Corinne Elroy ===
- Victoria Gabrielle Platt (1996)

She was attracted to Matteo Santos and later dated Jackson Montgomery. She helped Matteo and Kelly to hide.

=== William Emerson ===
- Michael McKenzie (2005)

=== Bruce Emery ===
- Holt McCallany (1986)

=== Brooke English ===
- Elissa Leeds (1976)
- Julia Barr (1976–81, 1982–06, 2010–11, 2013)
- Harriet Hall (1981–82)

Phoebe's niece, who married Tom Cudahy, Adam Chandler, Tad Martin and Edmund Grey (invalid) and had romances with Benny Sago, Dan Cuddahy, Mark Dalton Giles St. Claire and Jim Thomasen (whom she later murdered), she was the mother of Jamie Martin and the late Laura Cudahy (killed by a drunk driver) and the adoptive mother of Laura (Kirk) English. She was the news anchor for WMON-TV. She went to jail after she refused to name some of her news sources. She left Pine Valley once to work in Miami. She was raped by the late Eddie Dorrance and had an abortion. She was often accused of dating Erica's former husbands or boyfriends. She and Erica had a long-term feud.

=== Edward English ===
- James Hawthorne (1981)

Phoebe English Tyler Wallingford's older brother and Brooke English's father (who died of a heart attack), he was married to drug lord Peg "Cobra" English and had an affair with Jane Dobrin (Brooke's mother).

=== Peg "Cobra" English (deceased) ===
- Patricia Barry (1981)

Pine Valley's first drug lord (known as Cobra) and widow of Edward English, Peg was thought by Brooke for many years to be her mother. She died of a brain tumor in prison.

== F ==
=== Myrtle Lum Fargate (deceased) ===
- Eileen Herlie (1976–2008)

A former carny who ran the town boutique and a boardinghouse. A mentor, friend, and shoulder to cry on for all of Pine Valley. She was the mother of Gretel Rae Cummings, grandmother of Skye Chandler, great-grandmother of Lila Rae Alcazar, surrogate mother of Kitty Shea and Kelly Cole, and the widow of Nigel Fargate. She died in her sleep of a heart attack in December 2008.

=== Nigel Fargate (deceased) ===
- Alexander Scourby (1976–77)

Husband of Myrtle Lum Fargate.

=== Richard Fields (deceased) ===
- James A. Stephens (1993–94)

A movie actor who raped Erica on her 14th birthday (resulting in Kendall Hart) he was the father of Trey Kenyon (with Vanessa Hayward) and died of a heart attack in 1994.

=== Kit Fisher ===
- Paige Rowland (1998–99)

Travis' and Jackson's long-lost sister, Christine Montgomery.

=== Celia Fitzgerald ===
- Jordan Lane Price (2013)

Student at Bramwell Hall who is dating Pete Cortlandt.

=== Maggie Flanagan ===
- Paula Trueman (1977–78)

Elderly friend and neighbor of Marestella Latour. Passed away.

=== Lydia Flores ===
- Míriam Colón (1995)

=== Cassandra Foster ===
- Yaya DaCosta (2008)
- Saleisha Stowers (2013)

Adopted daughter of Angie Hubbard and Jacob Foster, adopted sister of Frankie Hubbard and stepsister of Natalia Hubbard, she arrived to meet her new stepfather Jesse Hubbard. She dated Dre Woods, and became the best friend of Colby Chandler.

=== Natalia Fowler ===
- Shannon Kane (2008–11)

=== Rebecca Fowler ===
- Laura Bonarrigo-Koffman (2008–09)

Psychiatrist who becomes engrossed in the life of her patient, Jesse Hubbard, with whom she begins a romance and gives birth to their daughter, Natalia. Diagnosed with a brain tumor, she refuses treatment and falls into a coma. When she regains consciousness she agrees to consider treatment, and Angie invites Natalia and Rebecca to stay with her.

=== Reverend Eliot Freeman ===
- Stan Albers (1988–99)
- David Beecroft (2000–01)

The former Josh Waleski was the drunk driver who killed Laura Cudahy. He later had a romance with Laura's mother Brooke, saved Laura Kirk English and left to preach abroad.

=== Danielle Frye ===
- Tanisha Lynn (2004–07)

Derek and Mimi's daughter, who dated Reggie Montgomery.

=== Derek Frye ===
- William Christian (1990–2007)
- Charles Parnell (2005–08)
- Jerome Preston Bates (2007–08)

Local detective and later police chief, he was divorced from Mimi Reed, dated Opal Courtlandt and Krystal Carey and is the brother of Livia Frye Cudahy.

=== Livia Frye ===
- Tonya Pinkins (1991–95, 2003–09)

An attorney, she is Derek's sister, married to Tom Cudahy, mother of Terrence, and adoptive mother of Jamal.

=== Terrence Frye ===
- Akili Prince (1991)
- Dondré T. Whitfield (1991–94)

Son of Livia Frye and Lucas Barnes, stepson of Tom Cudahy and adopted brother of Jamal Cudahy.

== G ==
=== Jenny Gardner Nelson (deceased) ===
- Kim Delaney (1981–84, 1994)

Daughter of Opal and Ray Gardner. Sister of Tad Martin. Married to Greg Nelson. Best friends with Jesse Hubbard and Angie Baxter. Surrogate daughter to Mrs. Gonzales. Hated by Enid Nelson. Died in a jet-ski explosion in 1984 engineered by her ex-fiancé, Tony Barclay who had meant to kill Greg. She returned as a ghost in 1994 to save her brother Tad Martin, who named his youngest daughter after her.

=== Ray Gardner (deceased) ===
- Gil Rogers (1977–78, 1979, 1982–83, 1994 [ghost], 2001 [ghost])

Opal's husband, the maniacal father of Jenny and Tad (who was abandoned and adopted by the Martins), died in a 1982 self-triggered explosion (an attempt to rescue Jenny).

=== Robert "Rob" Gardner ===
- David Rasche (2008)

Brother of the late Ray Gardner and uncle of Tad and Tad's late sister Jenny, he held Jesse Hubbard hostage for two decades and held Angie Hubbard at gunpoint during her second wedding to Jesse. He shot Tad and Julia Santos, killing Julia.

=== Lola Getz ===
- Allene Quincy (2003)

=== Roy Gibson ===
- Warren Davis (2010)

=== Esther Glynn ===
- Ann McDonough (1997–2000)

Found Maria's baby after Erica's car went off the bridge, and fell in love with Stuart Chandler.

=== Morgan Gordan ===
- Rebecca Mader (2003)

=== Caroline Murray Grant ===
- Pat Dixon (1976–79)

Nurse and Vietnam combat veteran. Ex-wife of Frank Grant. Learned of the true parentage of Carl Blair Jr. but kept the secret from her husband Frank.

=== Franklin "Frank" Grant ===
- Don Blakely (1972–73)
- John Danelle (1973–82)

Doctor at Pine Valley Hospital, husband of Nancy Grant and Caroline Murray Grant. Father to Carl Blair Jr. Uncle to Jesse Hubbard.

=== Nancy Grant Blair Fisher ===
- Lisa Wilkinson (1973–84, 1995)
- Avis McArther (1975)

Wife, ex-wife, and later wife (again) of Frank Grant, mother of Carl Blair Jr. and wife of Carl Blair.

=== Louie Greco ===
- (John Millard 1994–95)

Julia Santos' rapist. Jailed for selling drugs to Jamal Cudahy, with Julia as a witness. Upon his release, he terrorized and kidnapped Julia and provoked Noah. Died during a struggle with Noah after Julia was rescued.

=== Millicent Greenlee ===
- Joanne Bayes (1999)
- Mary Louise Wilson (1999–2001)

Mother of Mary Smythe, grandmother of Greenlee and the bossy town gossip.

=== Woodruff Greenlee ===
- John Carter (1998)

Father of Mary Smythe, grandfather of Greenlee and owner (and CEO) of Greenlee Investments.

=== Alf Gresham ===
- Steven Keats (1991)

=== Edmund Grey (deceased) ===
- John Callahan (1992–2005)

Novelist who married Maria Santos. Dimitri Marick's half-brother, he was engaged several times to Brooke and the father of Sam and Maddie. He lived at Wildwind, 3900 Glenview Road, Pine Valley, Pennsylvania 19010. Bludgeoned by Jonathan Lavery and left to die in a fire in the Wildwind barn.

=== Maddie Grey ===
- Jordan Vance (1997–98)
- Andrea and Julia Cambra (1998–2001)
- Paulina Gerzon (2001–04)
- Aryanna Rodriguez (2004–05)

Madeline Flora Grey, the daughter of Maria Santos and Edmund Grey, was kidnapped as a baby by Erica.

=== Samuel "Sam" Grey ===
- Alison and Meghan Tuma (1997)
- Michael Resh (1998)
- Michael Deutchman (2001–02)
- Shadoe Brandt (2002–04)
- Bobby Steggert (2005)

Biological son of Bobby Warner and Kelsey Jefferson and grandson of Tara Martin Jefferson and Cliff Warner. Adopted by Edmund and Maria. Had a romance with Lily Montgomery.

=== Verla Grubbs ===
- Carol Burnett (1983–84, 1995, 2005, 2011)

Verla Grubbs appeared in Pine Valley in search of long-lost family friend Myrtle Fargate, and her father was longtime con artist Langley Wallingford (who wanted to hide the truth from his wife, Phoebe Tyler). Verla left town, and when she returned she crashed her car into the Boutique (owned by Myrtle). When she asked Langley for permission to marry, Phoebe saw their embrace and thought they were having an affair. When Phoebe learned the truth, Verla was welcomed into the family before she left with her fiancé Rex. Verla returned in January 2005 to visit Myrtle in the hospital, and saw Bianca Kane Montgomery and her new daughter Miranda. She made her final appearance in September 2011, seeing Erica Kane at the Pine Valley Airport and swapping stories about Myrtle.

=== Rachel Gurney ===
- Portia Nelson (1983–91)

== H ==
=== Peter Haas ===
- Timothy Taylor (1987)

=== John Habar ===
- Hugh Karraker (1988)

=== Patricia Hale ===
- Cynthia Harris (1994)

=== Stephen Hamill ===
- Andrew Jackson (1991–93)

Doctor.

=== Leila Hannon ===
- Fay Wolf (2008)

=== Tina Harding ===
- Sara Hugh (1999–2001)

Former sign-language interpreter at Pine Valley Hospital who had a brief relationship with Adrian Sword.

=== Nurse Harris ===
- Helen Gallagher (1995)

AKA General Harris

=== Sydney Harris ===
- Taylor Gildersleeve (2006)

Assistant housekeeper at Chandler Mansion, niece of Winifred and friend of Colby Chandler and Sean Montgomery.

=== Kendall Hart ===
- Sarah Michelle Gellar (1993–95)
- Alicia Minshew (2002–11, 2013)

Daughter of Erica Kane from her rape by Richard Fields. Surrendered for adoption at birth. She came to town to find Erica, had a short marriage to Anton Lang and left town with Del Henry. Returned to town and had romances with Ryan Lavery, Michael Cambias, Ethan Cambias, Aidan Devane and Griffin Castillo. She is the widow of Zach Slater. She is the mother of Spike (with Ryan) and Ian (with Zach). She is a heart transplant patient, who received, her late brother, Josh's heart. Also has a sister Bianca Montgomery.

=== Lenny Hayes ===
- Joey Auzenne (2007)

=== David Hayward ===
- Vincent Irizarry (1997–2006, 2008–11, 2013)

Villainous doctor who romances Erica Kane, Dixie Cooney, and married to Anna Devane, Greenlee Smythe and Krystal Carey. Son of Vanessa Bennett, brother of Leo du Pres, father of Babe Carey and her twin Marissa Tasker (with Krystal), Leora Hayward (with Anna) and Oliver Castillo (with Cara). After collapsing and apparently dying in September 2010 when he was poisoned, he returned when his plan to fake his murder backfired.

=== Leora Hayward (deceased) ===
- Elizabeth and Hailey (2003)

The daughter of David Hayward and Anna Devane and named for David's brother, Leo du Pres. She was the half-sister of Robin Scorpio, Babe Carey, Oliver Castillo, and Marissa Tasker. She died during surgery by Joe Martin for phlebitis.

=== Pam Henderson ===
- Patina Miller (2007–08)

Erica's producer on New Beginnings.

=== Del Henry ===
- Winsor Harmon (1994–95)
- Alec Musser (2005–07)

Kendall's ex-boyfriend, half-brother of Dixie Cooney and brother of Di Henry.

=== Di Henry (deceased) ===
- Kelli Giddish (2005–07)
- Heather Kenzie (2008)

Half-sister of Dixie and sister of Del, she pretended to be Dixie returning from the dead. She was shot and killed by Annie Lavery in November 2008.

=== Diana Holden ===
- Ella Thomas (2011)

=== Angie Baxter Hubbard ===
- Debbi Morgan (1982–90, on Loving from 1993 to 1995 and on The City from 1995 to 1997, 2008–11, 2013)
- Saundra Quarterman (1990–91)

A former doctor, married to Jesse and lived in Pine Valley, Corinth and Soho, she is the mother of Frankie Hubbard, adoptive mother of Cassandra Foster and stepmother of Natalia Hubbard. Believed her husband to have been dead for many years before reuniting.

=== Frankie Hubbard ===
- Judon Blake Foster (1984)
- Durrant Murphy Jr. (1985)
- Z. Wright (1986–91)
- Alimi Ballard (Loving, 1993–95 and The City, 1995–96)
- Jason Olive (2002)
- Cornelius Smith Jr. (2007–11)

Jesse and Angie's son, the paternal half-brother of Natalia, adopted brother of Cassandra Foster, father of William (with Mia) and husband of Randi.

=== Jesse Hubbard ===
- Darnell Williams (1981–88; 1994; 2001; 2008–11; 2013)

Pine Valley police chief who had a long romance with Angie, he was shot and apparently killed in 1988. After returns in 1994, 1995 2001, and 2002 as a ghost, he returned alive on January 22, 2008. He is the father of Frankie and Natalia Fowler and the stepfather of Cassandra Foster. Was best friends with Jenny Gardner until her death.

=== Lucy Hubbard ===
- Addison, Isis, Jackson, and Royal B. (2011)
- Phoenix Nicholson (2011)

=== Natalia Hubbard ===
- Shannon Kane (2008–11)

The daughter of Jesse Hubbard and Rebecca Fowler, Natalia returned to Pine Valley to speak with her father but Rebecca did not initially know her daughter's identity.

=== Randi Hubbard ===
- Denise Vasi (2008–11)

Former prostitute and wife of Frankie Hubbard.

=== Seabone Hunkle ===
- Steve Kanaly (1994–95)

Father of Dixie Cooney Martin, Will Cortlandt, Lanie Cortlandt Rampal, Del Henry and Di Henry.

=== Jeremy Hunter (deceased) ===
- Jean LeClerc (1985–92, 2001; Loving 1991–95)

The son of Alex Hunter, half-brother of Tim Dillon and twin brother of Gilbert Nostrand, he was formerly married to Natalie Marlowe (who was also married to Alex), the widower of Ceara Connor and the father of David Rampal (with Marissa Rampal). He was suffocated with quick-drying cement by Corinth serial killer Gwyneth Alden.

== J ==
=== Mel Jacobi ===
- Chris Wallace (1978)

=== Steve Jacobi ===
- Dack Rambo (1982–83)

Attorney. Had an affair with his secretary, Nina Cortlandt, and was injured in a plane crash.

=== Jim Jefferson ===
- Paul Falzone (2005)

High school teacher at Pine Valley High School. Step-father of Charlie Brent, father of Kelsey Jefferson, husband of Tara (Martin) Jefferson and grandfather of Sam Grey.

=== Kelsey Jefferson ===
- TC Warner (1995–98)

Daughter of Jim and Tara (Martin) Jefferson, sister of Charlie Brent and granddaughter of Joe Martin. Her marriage to Bobby Warner was annulled. She is the mother of Sam Grey.

=== Raymond Jenkins (deceased) ===
- Sam Freed (2007)

Had an affair with Zach's mother and was JR's nurse. Alexander Cambias Sr. pushed him off a balcony to his death.

=== Zora Jones ===
- Catrina Ganey (2001–02)

A nurse at Pine Valley Hospital, she was hired by Brooke as a long-term caregiver for Laura English after her heart transplant.

=== Carol Johnson ===
- Katherine Wise (1987)
- Joel Tyler (1989)

=== Evelyn Johnson ===
- Francesca James (2013)

Boarding-school teacher of Celia Fitzgerald.

=== Tanner Jordan (deceased) ===
- Vince Poletto (1996–97)

Friend of Mateo's, who drugged and raped Hayley and died from a gunshot wound.

== K ==
=== Wayne Kabak ===
- Peter Hermann (2003)

=== Ali Kahn ===
- Roxanna Hope Radja (2009–10)

Doctor.

=== Eric Kane (deceased) ===
- Albert Stratton (1989–90)

Hollywood movie director and father of Erica and Silver Kane and Mark Dalton, he left Pine Valley when Erica was young. After faking his death in a car accident and working as a circus clown, he died of cancer in Las Vegas in 2004.

=== Erica Kane ===
- Susan Lucci (1970–2011)
- Donna Vivino (1988)

Model turned makeup executive who was married 10 times (although only seven were valid), including Jeff Martin, Phil Brent, Mike Roy, Tom Cudahy, Dimitri Marick (twice), Adam Chandler (twice), Travis Montgomery (twice) and Jackson Montgomery. She is the mother of Kendall Hart-Slater, Bianca Montgomery and the late Joshua Madden, grandmother of Miranda Montgomery, Gabrielle Montgomery, Ian Slater and Spike Lavery, mother-in-law of Zach Slater, half-sister of Mark Dalton and Silver Kane and aunt of Julie Chandler.

=== Goldie Kane ===
- Louise Shaffer (1987)

Mother of Silver Kane, stepmother of Erica Kane and second wife of the late Eric Kane, she tried to kill Erica to obtain Eric's fortune.

=== Mona Kane Tyler (deceased) ===
- Frances Heflin (1970–94)

Erica Kane's kind-hearted mother, she worked as a secretary and married Charles Tyler at Pine Valley Hospital. Under the influence of sodium thiopental, she admitted that she accidentally killed Jason Maxwell. A rival of Phoebe Tyler who had lung cancer, she refused a dying Richard Fields (her daughter's rapist) his cardiac medication. She died of a heart attack in 1994.

=== Silver Kane ===
- Deborah Goodrich (1982–1983)
- Rosalind Allen (1987)
- Claire Beckman (1987–88)

Erica's half-sister came to town as Noelle Keaton, and her romance with Jeremy Hunter triggered an obsession. She was shot and killed in self-defense by Natalie Marlowe in 1988.

=== Dr. Christina Karras ===
- Robin Strasser (1976–79)

Once engaged to David Thornton, she was Jeff Martin's third wife.

=== Belinda Keefer ===
- Kimberly Hawthorne (1995–96)
- Amelia Marshall (1996–99)

Noah's sister and a prominent attorney in Pine Valley. She is also a good friend of Janet Greene.

=== Grace Keefer ===
- Lynne Thigpen (1993–2000)

A counselor at the Brooke English House homeless shelter, she was the widow of Ben Keefer, mother of the late Tony Keefer, sister of Warren Keefer and aunt of the late Noah Keefer, Belinda and Ella Keefer. She kidnapped Danielle Frye after suffering a nervous breakdown when Tony was killed by Mimi Reed-Frye when he and a friend attempted to rob Holidays. She eventually made a full recovery and became Dimitri Marick's personal assistant.

=== Noah Keefer (deceased) ===
- Keith Hamilton Cobb (1994–96)

Married to Julia Santos and nephew of Grace, he was ordered shot to death in 2005 by Garret Williams.

=== Creed Kelly ===
- James Horan (1988–89)

=== Nico Kelly ===
- Maurice Benard (1987–90)

Formerly married to Cecily Davidson Brent, Julie Chandler was attracted to him.

=== Heather Kent ===
- Stevie Steel (2013)

Boarding-school friend of Celia Fitzgerald.

=== Trey Kenyon ===
- Sam Page (2002–03)

Son of Vanessa Bennett and Richard Fields and half-brother of David Hayward, Leo du Pres and Kendall Hart.

=== Harris Kern ===
- Richmond Hoxie (1983)

=== Red Kilgreen ===
- Clifton James (1996)

Had romance with Myrtil. May have been Santa Claus?

=== Dr. Jonathan Kinder ===
- Bruce Thomas (1995)
- Michael Sabatino (1995–96)

Husband of Skye Chandler (later Quartermaine) when she was known as Toni, he held Skye captive and kidnapped Bianca. Erica, Skye and Janet eventually joined forces and successfully sent him to prison.

=== Brandon Kingsley ===
- Mike Minor (1980–82, 1988)
- Michael Woods (1981)

Modeling agency magnate and lover of Erica Kane, he was married to Sarah and the father of Pamela.

=== Sarah Kingsley ===
- Tudi Wiggins (1980–82)

=== Betsy Kennicott ===
- Carla Dragoni (1979–1982)

=== Laura Kirk English ===
- Lauren Roman (1995–98)
- Laura Allen (2000–02)

A runaway from New York City, she was adopted by Brooke English, dated Scott Chandler and was married to Leo du Pres.

=== Officer Rick Klein ===
- Edgar Ribon (2009)

Police officer.

=== Vlad Koslov (deceased) ===
- Alfredo Diaz (2013)

A sex trafficker, the partner and brother of Yuri Koslov, he was murdered by Yuri.

=== Uri Koslov ===
- Martin Harvey (2013)

Sex trafficker who kidnaps Cassandra Foster, brother and partner of Vlad Koslov.

=== Lena Kundera ===
- Olga Sosnovska (2003–04)

Bianca's second lover (her first was Sarah, whom she met at an eating-disorders clinic), who returned to Poland.

=== Paulina Kundera ===
- Elizabeth Shepherd (2003)

== L ==
=== Talia Lamarr ===
- Taro Meyer (1985)

actress

=== Hannah Lampert ===
- Leslie Hendrix (2004)

Judge.

=== Anton Lang ===
- Rudolf Martin (1993–96, 2004)

Long-lost son of Dimitri Marick whose mother, Corvina Lang (a Marick maid), seduced a drunken Dimitri. Briefly married to Kendall Hart and dated Julia Santos. Studied to become a doctor.

=== Corvina Lang ===
- Malgorzata Zajaczkowska (1994–95)

Mother of Anton. Returned to Hungary.

=== Boyd Larraby ===
- Marc Menard (2002–04)

Chemist who fell in love with Kendall, and helped cover up the Michael Cambias murder.

=== Marestella "Estelle" LaTour ===
- Kathleen Dezina (1977–82)

Best friend of Donna Beck and former prostitute on Locust Street. Estelle was in love with Benny Sago despite still being tied up in involvements with pimp Billy Clyde Tuggle. She married Billy Clyde, who fathered her baby via rape. Billy Clyde buried Estelle alive in 1980 (after the rape); she was rescued by Chuck Tyler and Benny. She would go on to marry Benny before her daughter, Emily-Ann Sago, was born. (Emily-Ann was later adopted by Donna and Benny as an infant, not discovering her true parentage until she was a teenager). Benny's gambling addiction put a strain on Estelle's relationship with him, but they remained devoted to each other until the end. Estelle died in the hospital in 1982 due to complications after a terrible automobile accident.

=== Braden Lavery (deceased) ===
- Zen Gesner (1997–99)
- Joseph Murphy (2005)

The brother of Ryan, Jonathan and Erin Lavery, he was severely abused as a child. He raped Kit Fisher, and was shot to death by Jonathan.

=== Emma Lavery ===
- Lucy Merriam (2006–10)
- Emily Alyn Lind (2010)
- Danielle Parker (2010–11)

The daughter of Ryan and Annie Lavery and half-sister of Spike Lavery. She was kidnapped by her mother after the tornadoes struck Pine Valley.

=== Erin Lavery (deceased) ===
- Connie Fletcher (2005–06)

The sister of Braden, Jonathan and Ryan Lavery, she was the only family member not abused by their father. She was murdered by the Satin Slayer, who poisoned her wine.

=== Jonathan Lavery ===
- Jeff Branson (2004–07)

Ryan's youngest brother, who experienced the worst abuse from their father Patrick. A brain tumor made him beat his girlfriend Lorraine Rossiter, abuse his fiancée Maggie Stone, murder Braden, Edmund Grey and bodyguard Steve, kidnap Kendall, Greenlee and Lily and blow up the cave in which they were captive. Presumed dead until Ryan found him living with Erin in Nova Scotia, his marriage to Lily Montgomery was annulled.

=== Ryan Lavery ===
- Cameron Mathison (1998–2011)

Con man turned ad salesman turned executive, he was married to the late Gillian (who died from a gunshot wound to the head) and engaged to Kendall before leaving town after he found her with Aidan Devane. Returning, he was married to Greenlee and Annie and the father of Emma (with Annie) and Spike (with Kendall).

=== Annie Lavery ===
- Melissa Claire Egan (2006–11)

Mother of Emma and ex-wife of Terry McDermott, Ryan Lavery, Adam Chandler and Scott Chandler, she killed her brother and kidnapped her daughter to keep her away from Greenlee Smythe. She had an affair with Adam's son, JR Chandler as well as Tad Martin, while she was married to Adam and Scott and was sent to Oak Haven after trying to kill JR's ex-wife Marissa and kidnapping Emma again.

=== Spike Lavery ===
- Ava and Julia Farrar (2006–07)
- Alexander, Benjamin and Caleb Eckstein (2007–09)
- Christian Eckstein (2008)
- Jake Vaughn (2010–11)

The son of Ryan Lavery and Kendall Hart Slater, stepson of Zach Slater, younger brother of Emma Lavery and older brother of Ian Slater, he was born in May 2006.

=== Damon Lazarre ===
- Charles Keating (1987)

Doctor who brainwashed Silver Kane into harming her half-sister, Erica Kane. He conspired with Silver's mother, Goldie Kane.

=== Leonardo ===
- Jordi Caballero (1998)

=== Laurie Lewis ===
- Alexandra Daddario (2002–03)

J.R.'s former girlfriend.

=== Mei Ling ===
- Liz Burnette (1989)

=== Eileen Littlejohn ===
- Kathryn Walker (1974)

=== Sarah Livingston ===
- Elisabeth Harnois (2000–01)

=== Lloyd (the Pit) ===
- Sean B. Sullivan (1999–2001)

Fixture at the Pit bar in Pine Valley.

=== Harold Loomis ===
- Thomas Sminkey (1983)

=== Marje Luper ===
- Becky Ann Baker (2007)

Mother of Zoe Luper, a rock star formerly known as Zarf.

=== Zoe Luper ===
- Jeffrey Carlson (2006–07)

A transgender lesbian rock star formerly known as Zarf, she was suspected of being the Satin Slayer but was cleared of the charge. Born Frederick "Freddie" Luper, she returned to London in April 2007 to continue her transition and begin work on a new album.

=== Trish Lyman ===
- Audrey Peters (1985)

=== Dr. Kara Lynden ===
- Elena Goodman (2005)

== M ==
=== Greg Madden (deceased) ===
- Ian Buchanan (2005–06)

A doctor who claimed to have implanted Erica's fetus into his wife (who then gave birth to Josh), raising Josh as his and Emily's son. He allowed Dixie to think she was dying so she would surrender her and Tad's daughter Kate for adoption. He was buried alive in a park during an earthquake by Tad Martin, who confessed to Dixie Martin.

=== Josh Madden (deceased) ===
- Scott Kinworthy (2005)
- Colin Egglesfield (2005–09)

The supervising producer of Erica's show, who was determined to ruin her career. Introduced as the son of Greg and Emily Madden, he was revealed to be the long-lost son of Jeff Martin and Erica Kane (the result of Erica's abortion). Dying from a gunshot wound, his heart was transplanted into his sister Kendall.

=== Dimitri Marick ===
- Michael Nader (1991–2001, 2013)
- Anthony Addabbo (2001)

A Hungarian count who was married to Angelique, Erica Kane, Gloria Marsh and Alexandra Devane, he is the half-brother of Edmund Grey, cousin of Gillian Andrassy and father of Anton Lang. He returned to Pine Valley from Budapest in 2013.

=== Wilma Marlowe ===
- Jo Henderson (1985–88)
- Ruby Holbrook (1986–87)
- Dena Dietrich (1994)

A busybody who moves from Canada to be near her daughter Natalie Marlowe, she is also the mother of Janet Green (whom she abused, favoring Natalie).

=== Lea Marquez ===
- Paula Garcés (2013)

FBI agent who comes to Pine Valley to investigate Zach Slater.

=== Gloria Marsh ===
- Teresa Blake (1991–98)

A nurse and former con artist, she was romantically involved with Craig Lawson when he was married to Dixie and made a sex tape to blackmail him. After she was raped by Will Cortlandt, she became involved with Stuart Chandler, but married Adam Chandler. She attempted suicide with a drug overdose but was saved by Erica Kane, when her traumatic childhood with a radical Christian mother was disclosed. After Adam caused the premature birth and subsequent death of their infant daughter Anna Claire, she began poisoning him with arsenic. After a fling with Tad and a brief marriage to Dimitri, she left town.

=== Burt Marston ===
- John Doman (1994)

=== Bobby Martin ===
- Mike Bersell (1970)

Joe and Helen's son, who disappeared after going to an attic to wax his skis. Years later, Opal was locked in the attic and found a skeleton wearing a ski cap with the name "Bobby" on it. On Oct. 31, 1997, Myrtle Fargate used his skeleton as a party decoration.

=== Dr. Jake Martin ===
- Michael Scaleri (1983–88)
- Michael Brainard (1988–91, 1994–95)
- Michael Lowry (1996–2000)
- J. Eddie Peck (2000–03)
- Ricky Paull Goldin (2008–11)

Joseph Martin II is the son of Dr. Joseph Martin and Ruth Martin, the half-brother of Bobby, Jeff, Tara Martin and brother of the adopted Thaddeus ("Tad") Gardner Martin. Formerly married to Emily Ann Sago and Gillian Andrassy, he had a romance with Greenlee Smythe, moved to Africa and married Cara Castillo (who left him). Returning to Pine Valley, he is married to Amanda Dillon and the father of Trevor Martin.

=== Jamie Martin ===
- Jamal and Jamil Azizi (1993–94)
- Sean Marquette (1994–98)
- Zachary Kady (1998–2001)
- Todd Harrison (2001–02)
- Micah Alberti (2002–03)
- Justin Bruening (2003–07, 2011)

The son of Tad and Brooke, he romanced sister-in-law Babe Carey Chandler and Julia Santos Keefer.

=== Dr. Jeff Martin ===
- Christopher Lofton (1970–71)
- Charles Frank (1971–75, 1988, 1995)
- Robert Perault (1976–77)
- James O'Sullivan (1977–79)
- Jeffrey Byron (1986–87)
- Robert Tripp (1987)
- John James (2006–07)

Joe and Helen's son, and the brother of Tara Martin and Tad Martin. Married to Erica Kane (later annulled), Mary Kinnecott and Christina Karras, he was Tad's doctor when he was pushed from a car by Ray Gardner as a child. Tad later lived with Jeff and Mary, who considered adopting him, and was tried for the murder of Jason Maxwell. He is the father of Josh Madden, Erica's long-lost son who was an unsuccessful abortion.

=== Dr. Joe Martin ===
- Ray MacDonnell (1970–2011, 2013)

Local doctor and head of the Martin family.

=== Kate Martin (deceased) ===
- Kate Harrington (1970)
- Christine Thomas (1970)
- Kay Campbell (1970–85)

Beloved matriarch and mother of Joe and Paul Martin, she died in her sleep in October 1985 of a heart attack.

=== Kathy Martin ===
- Alexa Gerasimovich (2006–10)
- Dannika Liddell (2010–11)

Adopted by Julia Santos; Adam Chandler is the only one who knows that she is the daughter of Tad Martin and Dixie Cooney. After Julia's death, she was raised by Maria Santos before she was returned to Tad.

=== Margo Flax Martin ===
- Eileen Letchworth (1972–76)

An aging former model and roommate of Erica, she had a facelift in 1974 to keep Paul Martin interested in her. The mother of Claudette Montgomery and ex-wife of Harry, she convinced Jason Maxwell that he was Claudette's father to obtain child support for her private education and lavish wedding to Spencer Montgomery. Developed an infatuation for Paul Martin and tried to poison his wife Anne. Paul confronted her and she left town.

=== Paul Martin ===
- Ken Rabat (1971–72)
- William Mooney (1972–82, 1983, 1995)

The son of Kate and Henry Martin and brother of Joe, he was believed dead when he was a Korean prisoner of war. Married to Margo Flax and Anne Tyler, he is the father of Beth Martin.

=== Ruth Martin ===
- Mary Fickett (1970–95, 1998–2000)
- Lee Meriwether (1996–98, 2002–11)

A nurse, the widow of Ted Brent, second wife of Joe Martin, adoptive mother of Phil Brent and Tad Martin, mother of Jake Martin (Joseph Martin Jr.) and sister of Amy Tyler, she was raped by Ray Gardner.

=== Tad Martin ===
- Matthew Anton (1972–77)
- John E. Dunn (1978–81)
- Michael E. Knight (1983–86, 1988–90, 1992–2011, 2013)
- Terrell Anthony (1990)

Opal's son with Ray Gardner, he was adopted by Joe and Ruth Martin. Brother of the late Jenny (Gardner) Nelson, Adrian Sword and Peter Cortlandt and adopted brother of Tara, Jeff, Bobby and Jake Martin, he was married to Dottie Thornton, Hillary Wilson, Dixie Cooney (3 times), Brooke English, Krystal Carey and Cara Castillo and the father of Jamie (with Brooke), Damon (with Hillary), Kathy (with Dixie) and Jenny (with Krystal) and the stepfather of J.R. Chandler. His Pennsylvania license plate was GYV 903.

=== Tara Martin Jefferson ===
- Karen Lynn Gorney (1970–74, 1976–77, 1995)
- Stephanie Braxton (1974–76)
- Nancy Frangione (1977–79, 1985)
- Mary Lynn Blanks (1979–80)

Joe's daughter with his first wife, Helen, she was married to Chuck Tyler, Philip Brent and Jim Jefferson, the mother of Charlie Brent and Kelsey Jefferson and a friend of Tom Cudahy.

=== Trevor Martin ===
- Aidan and Connor Sharpe (2009–10)
- Logan and Noah Ireland (2010)
- Dylan and Jordan Duszynski (2010–11)
- Brody and Michael McMaklin (2011)

The son of Jake Martin and Amanda Dillon was born onscreen on June 12, 2009. Originally believed to be David Hayward's son, he was named after maternal grandfather Trevor Dillon.

Robin McCall Hunter Tylo 1985

=== Terry 'T' McDermott ===
- Matt Walton (2006)

=== Bonnie McFadden ===
- Francesca and Daniela Serra (1981)

The daughter of Devon Shepherd McFadden and husband Wally McFadden and granddaughter of Ellen Shepherd Dalton, she became a child actress and left Pine Valley for Hollywood. She was the first to discover the presence of Stuart Chandler, her secret friend Willy.

=== Devon Shepherd McFadden ===
- Tricia Pursley (1977–81, 1983–84)

The daughter of Ellen Shepherd, wife of Wally McFadden and mother of Bonnie, she had an affair with Sean Cudahy. She studied drama at Pine Valley University, considered a lesbian affair with Lynn Carson and dated Chuck Tyler.

=== Wally McFadden ===
- Jack Magee (1978–80)
- Nigel Reed (1980)
- Patrick Skelton (1980–84)

The husband of Devon and father of Bonnie, he had a romance with Betsy Kinnecott.

=== Alec McIntyre ===
- Grant Aleksander (1993–95)

Biological father of Jamal Cudahy. Hired by Adam Chandler, he relentlessly pursued his wife, Gloria. Romanced and married Adam's daughter Haley Vaughn to cover his embezzlement from Enchantment. Slept with her mother, Arlene, because she blackmailed him. Exposed and jailed for his crimes.

=== Jane McIntyre ===
- Heather Roop (2013)

Owner of Jane's Addiction.

=== Dr. Meeker ===
- Tom Fitzsimmons (1995)

=== Maya Mercado ===
- Mariah Buzolin (2011)

The Chandler family maid and friend of Colby Chandler and Asher Pike, she delivered a baby and placed it in the back of Brot's squad car; her daughter was switched with the stillborn daughter of Jessie and Angie.

=== Kathy Mershon ===
- Alexa Gerasimovich (2006–10)

Kathleen "Kathy" Martin (formerly Mershon) is the daughter of Dixie Cooney and her husband Tad Martin. She was adopted by Jim and Linda Mershon because her biological mother's doctor kidnapped her and gave to her adoptive parents.

=== Charles Michaelson ===
- Rick Pasqualone (2010)

=== Andrew Miller ===
- Burke Moses (2003)

=== Carol Miller ===
- Elaina Erika Davis (2002)

=== Damon Miller ===
- Finn Wittrock (2009–11)

He came to town in search of his girlfriend, Bailey Wells, he is later revealed as the son of Tad Martin and ex-wife Hillary Wilson. The half-brother of Jamie, Kathy, and Jenny Martin, he committed a string of burglaries when he first came to town. He dated Colby Chandler before sleeping with her mother, Liza, and left town for an internship and to give Colby time to adjust to his mistake.

=== Paul Miller ===
- Robert Curtis Brown (2010)

Husband of Hillary Wilson and stepfather of Damon Miller, he was neglectful and cruel to Damon when he was growing up because Damon was not his son.

=== Brot Monroe ===
- J.R. Martinez (2008–11)

A member of the Pine Valley Police Department, he served in the U.S. Army during the Iraq War with Taylor Thompson and Frankie Hubbard and was injured in combat, receiving severe burns to over 40 percent of his body. The former boyfriend of Taylor Thompson, he was engaged to Natalia Hubbard.

=== Barbara Montgomery ===
- Susan Pratt (1987–91, 1995–98, 2007)

Influential in business, she was the ex-wife of Tom Cudahy, widow of Travis Montgomery (married twice) and mother of Molly and Sean.

=== Bianca Montgomery ===
- Jessica Leigh Falborn (1988–90)
- Caroline Wilde (1990–91)
- Lacey Chabert (1992–93)
- Gina Gallagher (1993–97)
- Nathalie Paulding (1997–98)
- Eden Riegel (2000–10, 2013)
- Christina Bennet Lind (2010–11)

The daughter of Erica Kane and Travis Montgomery, half-sister of Kendall Hart, the late Josh Madden and Molly and Sean Montgomery and niece of Jackson Montgomery, she has had Reye syndrome and anorexia nervosa and been raped by Michael Cambias (which produced Miranda Mona Montgomery). Admitting that she was a lesbian in 2000, she lived in Paris with Miranda and partner Maggie Stone. After moving back to Pine Valley in the fall of 2006, she returned to Paris in April 2007 with Miranda. In 2008 she had a second daughter (fathered by Zack Slater) with her partner, Reese Williams. After they married and divorced, she was in a relationship with Marissa Tasker.

=== Claudette Montgomery (deceased) ===
- Paulette Breen (1975)
- Susan Plantt-Winston (1977–80)

The sexy, spoiled daughter of Margo Flax Martin and Harry Flax, her first husband was Spenser Montgomery. After her imprisonment for cocaine possession, she returned to Pine Valley in 1977 and was Erica's rival for Nick Davis. Erica planted drugs in her purse, Nick retrieved them and replaced them in Erica's purse, and Erica was arrested. Claudette died in a 1980 car accident after she killed Eddie Dorrance because he stole her stock in Unirest.

=== Gabrielle Montgomery ===
- Alivia, Anthony, Brynne and Olivia (2008–09)
- Aerowyne Jones (2010)
- Ellah Miller (2010–11)

The daughter of Bianca Montgomery and her partner, Reese Williams, she is the maternal half-sister and paternal cousin of Miranda Montgomery and the paternal half-sister and maternal cousin of Spike Lavery and Ian Slater. Born in October 2008, her father is Zach Slater.

=== Jackson Montgomery ===
- Walt Willey (1987–Present)

A former district attorney and a lawyer in Pine Valley, he is the brother of Travis Montgomery. Long-time love and former husband of Erica Kane (married in 2005). He was married to Laurel Banning (adopted her daughter Lily), is the father of Greenlee Smythe (the result of a summer romance with Mary Greenlee) and adopted Reggie Porter as a teenager. His address was 400 Lake Drive Apartment 3G, Pine Valley, Pennsylvania 19010.

He is scheduled to make an appearance on General Hospital in July 2023.

=== Lily Montgomery ===
- Michelle Trachtenberg (1993–96)
- Mischa Barton (1995)
- Portia Reiners (2000–06)
- Shayna Levine (2002–03)
- Leven Rambin (2004–08, 2010)

Jackson's adopted, autistic daughter from his marriage to Laurel Banning. Adoptive brother Reggie. Her marriage to Jonathan Lavery was annulled. She left Pine Valley in 2009 to attend college.

=== Miranda Montgomery ===
- Joseph and Raymond Cartigiano (2004)
- Haley Evans (2006–09)
- Mackenzie Aladjem (2010–11)
- Denyse Tontz (2013)

Although the daughter of Bianca Montgomery and Michael Cambias was conceived by rape, because she is a Cambias she has a share of Cambias Industries. The granddaughter of Erica Kane, she is aged to a high-school student in the series' online reboot.

=== Reggie Montgomery ===
- Chadwick Boseman (2003)
- Michael B. Jordan (2003–06)

Jackson's adopted son, who was sent to basketball camp. He was protective of Bianca Montgomery, his adoptive cousin

Boseman was fired after just a week after playing the role after he voiced concerns about racial stereotypes with the character and was replaced by his future Black Panther co-star Jordan. Despite firing him, the writers did ultimately listen to some of his concerns and rewrite parts of the character.

=== Sean Montgomery ===
- Brent Weber (2006–08)

The son of Travis and Barbara Montgomery, brother of Molly Montgomery, half-brother of Bianca Montgomery, uncle of Miranda Montgomery and nephew of Jackson.

=== Travis Montgomery (deceased) ===
- Larkin Malloy (1987–91, 1995–98, 2001)
- Daniel Hugh Kelly (1993–94)

A politician, he is Jackson's brother, Erica's ex-husband and the father of Bianca, Molly and Sean. Although he died of a stroke in Seattle in 2000, he returned the following year as an angel who helped the late Gillian Andrassy into heaven and guided Bianca and Erica through troubled times.

=== Peggy Moody ===
- Anne Meara (1992–99)

A maid at Wildwind, Peggy offered freshly baked pastry and common sense.

=== Hunter Morrison ===
- Daniel Covin (2013)

A high-school student and the crush of Miranda Montgomery.

=== Mitch Morrison ===
- Bob Gaynor (2013)

== N ==
=== Naomi ===
- Rosie O'Donnell (1996–97)

The cousin of Winifred, the Chandler maid.

=== Enid Nelson ===
- Natalie Ross (1981–96)

Mother of Greg and a Pine Valley socialite, in 1996 she was responsible for the firing of the gay Michael Delaney and had a part in the accidental death of Laurel Banning.

=== Greg Nelson ===
- Laurence Lau (1981–86, 2008, 2010)
- Don Scardino (1985)
- Jack Armstrong (1986)

Enid Nelson's son was Liza Colby's boyfriend and the widower of Jenny. Leaving Pine Valley for Washington in 1986, he came back after Jesse's return from the dead.

=== Hannah Nichols (deceased) ===
- Stacy Haiduk (2007–08)

The mother of Ethan Cambias and former Cambias maid, who was impregnated by Alex Jr. (now known as Zach), died over Millers Falls in January 2008.

=== Sophia Norris ===
- Jamie Lyn Green (2011)

=== Henry North (deceased) ===
- Kieran Campion (2009)

Pine Valley's district attorney, husband of Madison North and ex-lover of Randi Hubbard was killed by Madison with a bookend. Jesse Hubbard helped his daughter-in-law, Randi, cover up the crime she thought she committed.

=== Richie Novak (deceased) ===
- Billy Miller (2007–08)

Ex-convict son of Walter Novak and brother of Annie Lavery, he was killed by Annie with a crowbar on a dark night in the middle of a road.

=== Walter Novak ===
- Bob Hiltermann (2007)

Father of Annie Lavery and Richie Novak and grandfather of Emma Lavery, he lost his hearing when Richie threw him out a window.

=== Sophia Nunez ===
- Danica Hightower (2008)

== O ==
=== Doug O'Hara ===
- Tom Todoroff (1986–87)

=== Harry Oakes ===
- Cedric Cannon (2008)

=== Pam Olive ===
- Abiola Abrams (2000)

=== Jill Ollinger ===
- Holland Taylor (1981–83)

=== Joseph Orsini ===
- Sam Groom (1993)

=== Nola Orsini ===
- Barbara Rush (1992–94)

Believed Tad Martin was her missing son Ted. Left him her winery when she died.

== P ==
=== Juan Pablo ===
- Tomy Dunster (2003–04)

Multimillionaire Argentine venture capitalist and playboy who dated Greenlee.

=== Amy Parker Tyler ===
- Rosemary Prinz (1970)

Sister of Ruth Martin, mother of the late Phil Brent and previously married to Lincoln Tyler, she left town after the divorce. Owner of The Boutique and employer of Sydney.

=== Cindy Parker Chandler (deceased) ===
- Ellen Wheeler (1987–89, 2000–01)

The first wife of Stuart Chandler and mother of Scott Chandler died of HIV/AIDS-related complications in 1989. She returned as a ghost in 2000, and appeared in heaven the following year to welcome Gillian.

=== Karen Parker ===
- Ellen Wheeler (1989)

Twin sister of Cindy and aunt of Scott Chandler, she kidnapped Dixie and Adam's baby (JR) and demanded a million-dollar ransom.

=== Edward Pearson ===
- James Riordan (2009)

Judge.

=== Dennis Pelham ===
- Tom Wopat (2001–02)

=== Saad Pertiwi ===
- Samrat Chakrabarti (2008)

=== Seth Phelps ===
- John Lavelle (2004)

=== Asher Pike ===
- Trent Garrett (2010–11)

Friend of Colby and Damon and son of Caleb Cooney, he was working for JR and on his relationship with his father. Became addicted to painkillers after an injury at the quarry, and briefly dated Colby.

=== Cynthia Preston ===
- Jane Elliot (1984–86)

Ross Chandler's ex-wife and Andrew Preston's mother, she was a golddigger who married Palmer Cortlandt and cheated on him with Ross. Exposed as a fraud, she left town after being responsible for Andrew's imprisonment for Alex Hunter's murder.

=== Otis Price ===
- Thomas G. Waites (1987)

Baby-stealer.

=== Tish Pridmore ===
- Tina Louise (1994)

=== Ilene Pringle ===
- Dana Wheeler-Nicholson (2001)

=== Ralph Purdy ===
- Mart Hulswit (1983)

Husband of Opal Gardner Cortlandt. Originator of Purdy-fried chicken.

== R ==
=== David Rampal ===
- Trent Bushey (1988–91)

Son of the late Jeremy Hunter and Marissa Rampal and nephew of Tim Dillon, he became depressed after his mother's death. After marrying Lanie Cortlandt, they left for France.

=== Marissa Rampal (deceased) ===
- Nicole Orth-Pallavicini (1988)
- Nancy Addison Altman (1989)

The former lover of Jeremy Hunter and mother of David Rampal, she took cyanide but made it appear that Natalie killed her in a fight on stairs; this destroyed Jeremy and Natalie's marriage.

=== Mimi Reed ===
- Shari Headley (1991–95, 2005)

Former police officer and Derek's ex-wife.

=== Carlos Reyes (deceased) ===
- Maximillian Alexander (2003)

Juan Pablo's brother, who died of complications from a bone fragment in his lungs.

=== Wade Reynolds ===
- Tom Tammi (1995)

=== Owen Richardson ===
- Mark Setlock (2007)

=== Pierce Riley ===
- Jim Fitzpatrick (1995–96)
- Greg Wrangler (1996)
- Maxwell Caulfield (1996–97)

A recluse who lived in a cabin outside Pine Valley, he befriended Janet Green and Laura Kirk and dated Brooke English.

=== Mike Roy ===
- Nicholas Surovy (1983–85, 1998)
- Hugo Napier (1985)

Ghostwriter hired to help Erica write her autobiography. Raising Kane, and one of Erica's great loves. Supposedly killed while working on an undercover story with Brooke (whom Erica never forgave), his death was faked.

=== Loretta Rutherford ===
- Regina Scott (1990)

== S ==
=== Benny Sago ===
- Larry Fleischman (1976–79)
- Vasili Bogazianos (1980–90, 2005)

Limo driver and man-about-the-house for "Duchess" Phoebe Tyler Wallingford, he had romances with Brooke English, Estelle LaTour, Edna Thornton, Donna Beck Tyler and Nina Cortlandt and marriages to Edna, Estelle and Donna. The father (with Estelle; adopted by Donna) of Emily Ann Sago, he left town in 1990 but returned for Phoebe's 2005 funeral.

=== Emily Ann Sago ===
- Shannan Kijewski (1982–88)
- Amber Barretto (1986–88)
- Liz Vassey (1988–92)

The daughter of Estelle La Tour and Billy Clyde Tuggle was adopted by Benny Sago and Donna Beck. She was named in honor of Phoebe, who had just lost her daughter Anne Tyler, and was married to Jake (known as Joey) Martin.

=== Louisa Sanchez ===
- Laura San Giacomo (1988)

=== Bryan Sanders ===
- Curt May (1984–87)

=== Anita Santos ===
- Priscilla Garita (1994)
- Diane Davis (1995)
- Jordana Brewster (1995)
- Darlene Tejeiro (AKA Darlene Dahl) (1995–97)
- Natalia Cigliuti (2004–06)

Maria and Julia's sister, divorced from Bobby Warner, who had a brief romance with Aiden.

=== Hector Santos (deceased) ===
- Raúl Dávila (1994–96)

Hard working but self-righteous father of Maria, Julia, Mateo, Anita and Rosa who died in a car crash staged as an attempt on Julia's life.

=== Isabella Santos ===
- Socorro Santiago (1993–2004)
- Maryann Urbano (2004–05)

=== Julia Santos (deceased) ===
- Sydney Penny (1993–97, 2002, 2005–08)

Maria's sister and widow of Noah Keefer, a nurse at Pine Valley Hospital who spent nine years in witness protection. Romanced by Jamie Martin. Kathy's surrogate aunt was shot to death by Rob Gardner on May 22, 2008.

=== Lorenzo Santos ===
Son of Mateo Santos and Hayley Vaughan.

=== Dr. Maria Santos ===
- Eva LaRue (1993–97, 2002–05, 2010–11)

Married to Edmund Grey, mother of Maddie and Sam (adopted). Supposedly died in 1997 but was found alive in 2002. Left town in 2005, when Edmund was killed.

=== Mateo Santos ===
- Tito Ortiz (1994)
- Mark Consuelos (1995–2002, 2010)
- Kurt Caceres (2002)

Maria's and Julia's brother, married to Hayley Vaughan and father to Lorenzo. Also father of Max with ex-wife Raquel Dion.

=== Rosa Santos ===
- Catherine Gardner (1995–2000)
- Alana de la Garza (2001)

Maria, Julia, Anita and Mateo's sister.

=== Mia Saunders ===
- Amelia Heinle (2001–04)

Liza Colby's long-lost sister and the mother of William (who was surrendered for adoption).

=== Kevin Sheffield ===
- Ben Jorgensen (1996–98)

Gay ex-waiter at Holiday's.

=== Barry Shire ===
- Larry Pine (1997–99)
- Joel Fabiani (2000–10)

Adam Chandler's attorney.

=== Riley Sinclair ===
- McKenzie Westmore (2008–09)

Although she helps Annie Lavery after her breakdown and has a past with Annie's brother, she wants her to go to jail.

=== Ian Slater ===
- Doll (2007)
- Adrianna Fernicola (?)
- Scott Peck (?)
- Blake and Caden Pandormo (?)
- Cole and Luke Amante (2009–10)
- Britton Reeder (2010–11)

The son of Kendall Hart-Slater and her husband Zach was born prematurely on July 26, 2007. He is the younger half-brother of Spike Lavery and Ethan Cambias.

=== Zach Slater ===
- Thorsten Kaye (2004–11, 2013)

Formerly known as Alexander Cambias Jr., he is a casino owner who began an affair with Maria, and was later married to Kendall Hart. He is the father of Ethan Cambias with Hannah, a Cambias maid, Ian Slater with Kendall and a sperm donor to Bianca Montgomery for her second daughter, Gabrielle. Supposedly killed in a plane crash, his body was not found and he was reported alive in August 2011.

=== Jasper Sloane ===
- Ronald Drake (1982–92)

Palmer's butler who married Myra Murdoch, Palmer's housekeeper. Had a recurrent back problem.

=== Liz Sloan ===
- Kimberly Foster (1994–95)

No relation to Jasper or Myra. Waitress at McKay's who was hired by Adam Chandler to seduce Edmund Grey and tank his congressional campaign. After he lost, made amends by helping Edmund and Brooke investigate Congressman Calloway. Had a daughter, Allison.

=== Myra Murdock Sloane (deceased) ===
- Elizabeth Lawrence (1979–91)

Mother of Daisy. Was Palmer's long-time housekeeper who stayed at Cortlandt Manor to raise her granddaughter, Nina. Was always unafraid to stand up to Palmer.

=== Greenlee Smythe ===
- Rebecca Budig (1999–2005, 2008–11)
- Sabine Singh (2007–08)

Greenlee (her mother's maiden name) is a wealthy debutante from one of Pine Valley's most prominent families. The founder and co-owner of Fusion Cosmetics is the widow of Leo du Pres, the ex-wife of Ryan Lavery and Aidan Devane, the daughter of Jackson Montgomery and Mary Smythe, the adopted sister of Lily and Reginald Montgomery and the granddaughter of Woodruff Greenlee and Millicent Greenlee. She was presumed dead in a motorcycle accident before her remarriage to Ryan, and was nursed back to health by David Hayward before marrying Ryan.

=== Mary Smythe ===
- Anna Stuart (2002–05, 2009)

Greenlee's sculptor mother, the socialite daughter of Woodruff and Milicent Greenlee who traveled the world with her parents' money. The ex-wife of Roger Smythe revealed after Roger's death that Jackson Montgomery was Greenelee's father. She was briefly involved with Adam Chandler, and dated Palmer Cortlandt.

=== Roger Smythe (deceased) ===
- Mark Pinter (2001–03)

Greenlee's father, who spent years neglecting her while he traveled around the world with Mary, returned to town when the marriage ended. Roger died at Greenlee's wedding to Leo DuPres, when he was struck by a bullet meant for Leo. He briefly dated Erica and revealed a past with Leo's mother, Vanessa Bennett Cortlandt (who Roger did not know was his boss, Proteus).

=== Joni Stafford ===
- Amanda Seyfried (2002–03)

Former nanny of Maddie Grey, who dated Jamie Martin and kissed Reggie Porter.

=== Marilyn Stafford ===
- Johanna Day (2002–03)

=== Chris Stamp (deceased) ===
- Jack Scalia (2001–03)

A Federal agent who began an affair with Erica and was shot dead by a mobster, he was erroneously identified as Ryan Lavery's father.

=== Kit Sterling ===
- John O'Hurley (2011)

=== Lila Stevenson ===
- Tovah Feldshuh (1997)

=== Frankie Stone (deceased) ===
- Elizabeth Hendrickson (2001)

Maggie's twin sister, shot dead by one of her Aunt Vanessa's henchmen, was Bianca's ex-girlfriend, cousin of David Hayward and Leo du Pres and niece of Vanessa Cortlandt.

=== Maggie Stone ===
- Elizabeth Hendrickson (2002–05, 2007)

Frankie's twin sister, the partner of Frankie's ex-girlfriend Bianca, came to Pine Valley to determine who killed her sister and why. Cousin of David Hayward and Leo du Pres and niece of Vanessa Cortlandt, she lived in Paris with Bianca and daughter Miranda (who considered Maggie a second mother). Returning to Pine Valley in the fall of 2006, she went back to Paris at Bianca's request in February 2007.

=== John Summerhill ===
- John Bolton (2006)

District attorney.

=== Tandy Suffern ===
- Kate Miller (2005)

=== Olga Swenson ===
- Peg Murray (1982–96)

NY modeling agent and close friend of Erica Kane. Sister of Lars Bogart. Also agent to Jenny Gardner and Tony Barclay.

=== Adrian Sword ===
- Mathew St. Patrick (1998–2000)

Opal's son with Frank Dawson, he was raised by Frank and Alice Dawson and is the half-brother of Tad Martin, Jenny Gardner, and Peter Cortlandt.

== T ==
=== Seth Tanner ===
- Franc Luz (1993–95)

=== Marissa Tasker (deceased) ===
- Brittany Allen (2009–10)
- Sarah Glendening (2010–11)

The daughter of Krystal Carey and David Hayward was an assistant to Liza Colby. After a flirtation with Scott Chandler, she married JR Chandler. In Krystal's dream, Marissa was the late Babe Carey's fraternal twin sister. The adoptive mother of JR's and Babe's son AJ who began a relationship with Bianca Montgomery, she was said to be dead on May 2, 2013.

=== Luther Tate ===
- Harry Spillman (1983)
- David Cryer (1984)

=== Jim Thomasen (deceased) ===
- Roscoe Born (1997)
- David Forsyth (1997–98)

Photographer who was murdered by Brooke for taking pornographic pictures of her underage daughter.

=== Caleb Thompson ===
- Christian Slater (1986)

=== Taylor Thompson ===
- Beth Ehlers (2008–09)

An Iraq War veteran with PTSD who briefly dated Jake Martin before discovering that her fiancé, Brot Monroe, was alive.

=== Sybil Thorne (deceased) ===
- Linda Gibboney (1979–81)

A nurse who was hired by Palmer Cortlandt to breakup Nina Cortlandt & Cliff Warner. She had an affair with Cliff and became pregnant with his child before Cliff married Nina in a lavish ceremony in September 1980. Socially dated Mark Dalton. Her baby Bobby Warner, was adopted by Nina after Sybil was murdered by Sean Cudahy.

=== David Thornton ===
- Paul Gleason (1975–78)

Doctor.

=== Dottie Thornton ===
- Tasia Valenza (1982–86)

Briefly married to Tad Martin and the mother of his child. When she miscarried before the wedding she did not tell him, and the truth ended the marriage.

=== Ricky Torres (deceased) ===
- Eddie Matos (2010–11)

The minister who officiated at Zach Slater's funeral was later revealed to be working for Zach's casino partners and responsible for his death. He became obsessed with Zach's wife Kendall, claiming to be her fiancé and killing those in the way. Caught and sent to jail by Kendall and Griffin Castillo, he was killed in a prison attack.

=== Simone Torres (deceased) ===
- Terri Ivens (2001–07)

The Fusion Cosmetics executive had a romance with Tad Martin and was engaged to Ethan Cambias at the time of his death. She was murdered by the Satin Slayer, who poisoned her wine.

=== Billy Clyde Tuggle (deceased) ===
- Matthew Cowles (1977–80, 1984, 1989–90, 2013)

Billy Clyde Tuggle (also known as John Henry Rockefeller) was a violent pimp for prostitutes Donna Beck and Estelle LaTour. Briefly tried to go straight and owned a limousine company that failed, then resumed criminal activity. Although raised by Donna Beck and Benny Sago, Emily Ann Sago was the biological daughter of Billy Clyde and Estelle during their short lived marriage. Billy Clyde was jailed for raping and burying Estelle alive in 1980. After romancing Dixie Cooney, he held her in a cabin for several days. Presumed dead when he went over a bridge after a struggle with Tad Martin, he returned to Pine Valley in 2013. In a 2019 episode of General Hospital it is mentioned that criminal charges against Billy Clyde Tuggle are going through the courts.

=== Anne Tyler Davis Martin (deceased) ===
- Diane DeVegh (1970)
- Joanna Miles (1970–71)
- Judith Barcroft (1971–77)
- Gwyn Gilliss (1979–81)

The daughter of Charles Tyler and Phoebe Tyler, she was formerly married to a member of European royalty and held the title of 'Countess.' After the annulment of her first marriage, Anne's next husband would be Nick Davis, followed by Paul Martin (at her death). Mother of Elizabeth "Beth" Martin - a child with severe birth defects - who died in infancy, Anne would develop psychosis after her child's death. Anne was institutionalized at Oak Haven sanitarium after she attempted suicide with pills. She survived a poisoning attempt by Kitty Shea over Nick Davis, as well as attacks by Margo Flax over Paul Martin. Anne was a former fashion model and spent many years living in New York City. She died in a car-bomb explosion meant for Paul.

=== Dr. Charles Tyler (deceased) ===
- Hugh Franklin (1970–83)

The husband of Phoebe English and Mona Kane, father of Lincoln and Anne, grandfather of Chuck, and step-father of Erica Kane. Charles was former Pine Valley Hospital chief of staff; he fell in love with his secretary, Mona. He was more mellow and laid-back than his first wife, Phoebe (who was a "functional" alcoholic). Charles died in his sleep due to heart disease in August 1986.

=== Dr. Chuck Tyler ===
- Jack Stauffer (1970–73)
- Gregory Chase (1973–73)
- Chris Hubbell (1973–75)
- Richard Van Vleet (1975–84, 1989–92, 1995, 2005)

The grandson of Charles and Phoebe Tyler was the former husband of Tara Martin, Carrie Tyler and Donna Beck. He sometimes dated Erica Kane when they were in high school, but both knew that he was in love with Tara. He became a doctor and met prostitute Donna Beck in the hospital. He had false beliefs that Little Phil (who changed his name to Charlie Brent) was his son. He later dated Melanie Sawyer and Devon Shepherd McFadden. He later was the father of Palmer John Cortlandt, who died from smoke inhalation at strip club where his mother worked. He was good friends with both Dr. Franklin Grant and Dr. Clifford Warner.

=== Lincoln Tyler ===
- James Karen (1970)
- Paul Dumont (1970–71)
- Nicholas Pryor (1971)
- Peter White (1974–1980, 1981, 1995, 2005)

A successful attorney and the son of Charles Tyler and Phoebe Tyler. He was formerly married to Amy Parker and Kitty Shea and is married to Kelly Cole. He and Kelly decided to move in 1980 so they could have a fresh start. He returned to Pine Valley in 1981 for his sister Anne's funeral. Then again in 1995 for the show's 25th anniversary and in 2005 for his mother's funeral.

=== Phoebe Tyler Wallingford (deceased) ===
- Ruth Warrick (1970–2005)

A pillar of Pine Valley, her family (the Englishes) were early settlers in the region. The community's leading socialite, Phoebe prided herself on her family's ancestry and was a member of the Daughters of Fine Lineage (an exclusive women's club). Conservative in her politics, Phoebe softened and mellowed in her later years. The sister of Edward "Ed" English, aunt of Brooke English, mother of Lincoln "Linc" Tyler and Anne Tyler Martin, grandmother of Chuck Tyler and great-aunt of Jamie Martin; she was the ex-wife of the late Charles Tyler, Wade Matthews (50 years her junior) and was married twice to the late Professor Langley Wallingford (real name: Lenny Vlasik).

Phoebe had a longstanding feud with Mona Kane Tyler, as well as a longstanding problem with alcohol, often drinking to intoxication.

Phoebe wrote an advice column for Tempo Magazine.

=== Kelly Cole Tyler ===
- Francesca James (1978–80, 1981, 1984, 1986, 1995, 2005, 2008)

The long-lost, folksinging twin sister of Kitty Shea married her late sister's husband, Lincoln Tyler. She and Lincoln moved away in 1980, returning in 1981 for his sister Anne's funeral. In 1984 Kelly appeared again when Brooke was staying with her and Linc. She returned to Pine Valley in 1986 for Charles' funeral, in 2005 for Phoebe's funeral and on December 19, 2008, for the memorial service for her surrogate mother, Myrtle Fargate.

=== Kitty Shea Davis Tyler (deceased) ===
- Francesca James (1972–78)

A dance teacher from Hollywood who came to Pine Valley for information on her mother, she is the ex-wife of Hal Shea (also known as Hal Short) and Nick Davis, the late wife of Lincoln Tyler and twin sister of Kelly. She had moved to Hollywood earlier in hopes of becoming a movie dancing star. She worked at Nick Davis' dance studio and fell in love with Nick. She became pregnant, they married but she lost the baby and the marriage fell apart. She had a strong desire to find information or to locate her natural mother, who she suspected may have lived in Pine Valley. In one of her attempts to find her mother, she met imposter Myrtle Lum. She worked at The Boutique for Anne and Mrs. Lum. She died of a brain tumor.

=== Becca Tyree ===
- Abigail Spencer (1999–2001)

J.R.'s former babysitter, who dated Scott Chandler and Leo du Pres.

== U ==
=== Stan "Mr. U" Ulatowski ===
- Eugene J. Anthony (1988–91)

Worked for Palmer Cortlandt and tried to steal his fortune.

=== Slade Upton ===
- R. Ward Duffy (1989)

== V ==
=== Sarah Valentine ===
- Alyce Webb (1984)

Housekeeper to the Wallingfords. Grandmother of Sharla Valentine.

=== Sharla Valentine ===
- Tichina Arnold (1989–91)

Granddaughter of Sarah Valentine and friend of Emily Ann Sago.

=== Anthony Van Felt ===
- Mark H. Dold (2001–07)

=== Vera Vanderbilt ===
- Grace Garland (1983) African-American who was befriended by Jesse and Angie.

=== Alfred Vanderpool ===
- Bill Timoney (1982–2004)

A high-school friend of Liza Colby, Greg Nelson, Amanda Cousins, Jenny Gardner and Tad Gardner Martin, he had a sister named Abigail and became a banker.

=== Christina Vargas ===
- Theresa Saldana (1997)

=== Juan Pablo Renato Ruiz de Vasquez ===
- Tomy Dunster (2003–04)

=== Arlene Vaughan ===
- Phyllis Lyons (1990–93)
- Olivia Birkelund (1995–2002)

Hayley's alcoholic mother married Harry Vaughn while pregnant with Hayley, started drinking after Harry's death. Sister of Trevor Dillon. Briefly married to Adam Chandler years later.

=== Hayley Vaughan Santos ===
- Kelly Ripa (1990–2002, 2010)

The daughter of Adam Chandler and Arlene Vaughan and niece of Trevor "Uncle Porkchop" Dillon had brief marriages to Will Cortlandt and Alec McIntyre. Married to Mateo Santos and a recovering alcoholic, she is the mother of Lorenzo Hector Santos and moved to Los Angeles to host a talk show.

=== David Vickers ===
- Tuc Watkins (2005)

Crossover appearance from One Life to Live.

=== Allen Voight ===
- John Canary (1985–86)

Doctor and husband of Lucy. He was a chief surgeon who sexually harassed Dr. Angela Baxter Hubbard.

=== Lucy Voight ===
- Linda Cook (1985–86)

Wife of Allen Voight.

=== Eugenia von Voynavitch ===
- Meg Mundy (1997–2001)

=== Angelique Voynitzheva Marick ===
- Season Hubley (1992–94)

Was married to Hungarian count Dimitri Marick. Daughter of Helga.

=== Helga Voynitzheva ===
- Susan Willis (1992) a maid who was Angelique's crazy mother. Former mother-in-law of Hungarian count Dimitri Marick.

== W ==
=== Gayle Walker ===
- Anna Koonin (2009–10)

Nurse.

=== Langley Wallingford (deceased) ===
- Louis Edmonds (1979–95)

He came to Pine Valley as con man Lenny Vlasik (posing as 'Professor Wallingford'), but Myrtle Fargate knew him from her carnival days. He was married to Phoebe Tyler - twice - until his death, and was the father of Hillary Wilson and Verla Grubbs (Carol Burnett). Phoebe discovered his true identity years into their relationship.

=== Bobby Warner ===
- Matthew MacNamara (1981–88)
- Chris Mazura (1988–89)
- Brian Gaskill (1995–97)
- Christian Campbell (2004–05)

The son of Cliff Warner and Sybil Thorne, he was adopted by Cliff's wife Nina after Sybil's death. He married Kelsey Jefferson after she gave birth to his son; the marriage was annulled, and the child was given to Edmund Gray and Maria Santos Grey to adopt.

=== Cliff Warner ===
- Peter Bergman (1979–89)

Doctor and husband of Nina and father of Bobby and Michael. He fathered the son of Sybil Thorne, R. N. and, after her death, adopted that son. He was the brother of Amy Warner and Linda Warner. He was never accepted by his father-in-law Palmer Courtlandt.

=== Linda Warner ===
- Melissa Leo (1984–85)

=== Lyle Wedgewood ===
- Philip Bosco (2000)

=== Olive Whelan ===
- Maureen O'Sullivan (1981)

=== Rain Wilkins ===
- Kelly Overton (2000–01)

=== Garret Williams (deceased) ===
- Lamman Rucker (2005)

A crime lord known as the Dragon, he was shot dead by Julia Santos Keefer on October 11, 2005.

=== Reese Williams ===
- Tamara Braun (2008–09)

An architect and Bianca Montgomery's ex-wife, she lives in Paris.

=== Horace Willoughby ===
- Don Keefer (1986)

=== Hillary Wilson ===
- Carmen Thomas (1984–88)

The daughter of Langley Wallingford and Betty Wilson, she married Tad Martin after her marriage to Bob Georgia and after Tad left Dottie Thornton when she lost their baby. She was a rival of Skye Chandler for Mitch Beck. In 2010 Tad learned that she was married to Paul Miller and had a son, Damon (later revealed as Tad's son).

=== Winifred ===
- Cheryl Hulteen (1991–2007, 2011, 2013)

Adam Chandler's maid and the aunt of Sydney Harris.

=== Taffy Winslow ===
- Kathleen Gati (1989–90)

=== Seamus Wong ===
- Joel de la Fuente (2007)

=== Dre Woods ===
- Sterling Sulieman (2007–08)

=== Melvin Woods ===
- Melvin Van Peebles (2008)

Father of Samuel Woods.

=== Samuel Woods ===
- Mario Van Peebles (2008)

Son of Melvin Woods.

== Y ==
=== John Youngblood ===
- David Lee Smith (1993)
