= Josh Madden =

- All My Children character
- Colin Egglesfield as Josh Madden
- Portrayed by: Scott Kinworthy (2005); Colin Egglesfield (2005–2009)
- Duration: 2005–2009
- First appearance: June 17, 2005
- Last appearance: January 19, 2009
- Created by: Megan McTavish
- Introduced by: Julie Hanan Carruthers
In-universe information
- Occupation: Former CEO of Chandler Enterprises/Former Cambias Industries Executive
- Family: Martin; Kane
- Parents: Jeff Martin; Erica Kane
- Adoptive parents: Greg Madden; Emily Madden
- Half-sisters: Kendall Hart; Bianca Montgomery
- Grandparents: Joe Martin; Helen Martin; Eric Kane; Mona Kane Tyler
- Aunts and uncles: Tara Martin; Bobby Martin; Tad Martin (adoptive); Jake Martin; Mark Dalton; Silver Kane
- Nieces and nephews: Spike Lavery; Ian Slater; Miranda Montgomery; Gabrielle Montgomery
- First cousins: Charlie Brent; Kelsey Jefferson; Jamie Martin (adoptive); Damon Miller (adoptive); Kathy Martin (adoptive); Jenny Martin (adoptive); Trevor Martin; Julie Rand Chandler

Joshua "Josh" Madden is a fictional character from the American daytime drama, All My Children. He first came to Pine Valley on June 17, 2005, and was originally portrayed by actor Scott Kinworthy until September 15, 2005. Following Kinworthy's departure, he was portrayed by actor Colin Egglesfield from September 2005 until January 2009.

The character was initially the subject of a controversial and landmark abortion storyline back in the early 1970s, having been the fetus in which the abortion was centered. When the abortion storyline was rewritten to not have been an abortion after all, controversy ensued again, as viewers felt that it was an undoing of a groundbreaking event in television history.

== Background ==
The writers originally scripted Josh's birth date to be May 18, 1971. When Alicia Minshew took over the role of Kendall Hart in 2002, the producers had Kendall's birth year changed to 1976, thus pushing Erica Kane's even later than it was before, to 1962. This left Josh's birth date between his sisters,' Kendall's (1976) and Bianca Montgomery's (1984), with his now set at December 18, 1980.

Josh is the son of characters Erica Kane and Jeff Martin. Originally, the character was to have been aborted (in what was the first abortion on television after the Roe v. Wade decision). However, later during Megan McTavish's third stint as All My Children head writer, a character named Dr. Greg Madden was written to have taken the embryo and implanted the embryo into his wife.

== Storylines ==
As an adult, Josh comes to Pine Valley, and Erica Kane, not yet knowing that Josh is her son, hires him as a producer at her talk show "New Beginnings". In order to steal Erica's job, Josh begins to sabotage Erica, even going so far as to drug her, and frames Amanda Dillon in his place. His devious intentions are eventually revealed, and he is fired as producer of Erica's talk show, with Erica hating him.

In late July 2006, not long after Greg has been killed, Josh finally discovers the truth about his birth at the opening of the nightclub ConFusion. He is devastated and decides to leave town. Erica tries to explain to him that she does not hate him and her reasons for making the decision to have an abortion all those years ago, but Josh does not want to listen to her.

Throughout the whole Greg Madden ordeal, Josh develops a close relationship with Babe Carey Chandler, who convinces him to stay in town. Josh gradually falls in love with Babe and has a one-night stand with her. However, despite her rocky marriage to JR, she chooses to stay with her husband, leaving Josh heart-broken and more willing to fight for her love.

Josh connects with his half-sister, Bianca Montgomery, whom he loves, but is not above using to get what he wants; however this characteristic does not faze Bianca, and it allows her to share with her older half-brother that her girlfriend, Maggie Stone, cheated on her while they were in Paris. Like most everyone else in the Kane-Montgomery family, Josh proves to be extremely protective of Bianca, especially where her happiness is concerned and is acrimonious towards Zarf/Zoe, whom he thinks would hurt Bianca.

Josh's relationship with his other half-sister, Kendall Hart Slater, though not at first as close as his relationship to Bianca, also becomes stronger. He is sometimes seen as somewhat of a protector of Kendall as well, and is able to connect with Erica at times, the two having found a certain comfort with each other.

Josh leaves Pine Valley after Babe is apparently murdered by the Satin Slayer. However, after the funeral, Babe is seen waking in a hidden room in Zach Slater's casino and Josh asks how she feels. Josh, Kendall, Zach, Joe, Jeff, and Jack, all aware that Babe is still alive, keep this fact a secret in order to keep her out of harm's way. Once back in Pine Valley, due to Josh's constant unwanted involvement in Babe's matters, Babe tells Josh to get out of her life. Some time afterward, Josh has a fling with a woman named Hannah Nichols.

Before he becomes boss at Chandler Enterprises, he is briefly involved with Greenlee Smythe. Due to having tricked the Chandlers out of their fortune, Zach is able to do what he wants with Chandler Enterprises. He names Josh as Chandler Enterprises' new boss. But when Adam Chandler regains control of Chandler Enterprises, Josh becomes the former CEO of the company.

In June 2008, he has a one-night stand with Greenlee. He leaves in September 2008 due to being cast out of the family by Zach when it is revealed that he stole money from Zach's casino. Though Josh apologizes for the theft and says that he was going to pay Zach back, Zach will not forgive Josh and makes Josh's life "a living hell" while Josh is on the run.

Josh returns on January 14, 2009. He visits with a comatose Kendall, telling her how much he loves her and that he will make Zach pay for sending him into exile. A day later, after stealing ten million dollars from the casino, he takes Reese Williams (Bianca's new lover) hostage to ensure his escape. Erica and Bianca try to talk him out of the crime, but Josh refuses. Once Reese breaks free from Josh's grasp, Zach raises his gun at Josh. Josh, in turn, raises his gun at Zach. Zach does not hesitate in shooting Josh. As Josh is dying, he professes his love for Erica and Kendall and says that he just wanted a second chance. He soon dies. Zach orders the paramedics to keep Josh's heart pumping in order to save Kendall, who needs a heart transplant. Josh is put on life support and pronounced brain dead. It is Erica's decision whether or not to let the doctors do the heart transplant. She is torn on the matter, but there is no time to spare, as Kendall will soon die. Erica gives permission for the surgery and says goodbye to Josh with Bianca.

== Cultural impact ==
=== First legal abortion aired ===
Josh became the first legal abortion performed in American soap opera history, and, according to some sources, the first aired on American television. Author Gerry Waggett, when asked in an interview about All My Children usually being the first soap opera to tackle global issues and what storyline best exemplifies this, responded:

I would have to pick Erica's legal abortion back in 1973. Number one, it was timely. Abortion had only recently been legalized when Erica decided not to have her baby. Secondly, it was a bold move. I can't think of a hotter political topic for the time than abortion (it still remains a subject that soaps tend to avoid as much as possible; women may contemplate abortions, but rarely go through with having them). Erica's abortion let the fans know that All My Children was going to tackle some major issues. What made it work was that it was the perfect marriage of character to social issue storyline. We've all watched shows where some character develops a social issue problem that feels artificial to them as though it's been tacked onto them as some sort of glorified public service announcement. But Erica's abortion made sense. She was a rising model who didn't want a baby to derail that career. Whether you agree or disagree with her decision, you understand her rationale. That really is important for these social issue storylines to succeed — that they really be paired up with the right characters.

=== Rewrite controversy ===
When former head writer Megan McTavish rewrote Erica's abortion to not have been an abortion due to the antics of Dr. Greg Madden, it upset fans who felt that it was "a disgrace" to the ground-breaking abortion storyline Agnes Nixon had written three decades earlier. Colin Egglesfield, Josh's portrayer, when queried by Soap Opera Digest on the matter of possibly holding the record in daytime for the oddest way to be brought into the world, replied, "Yeah, and it's kind of funny because when people ask me who I am on the show, I like to say, 'I'm the abortion of Erica Kane.' Or, technically, I think it's a 'transportion.'"

Inkling Magazine, an often-updated magazine on the internet dedicated to science as they see it, commented on the impossibility of the storyline in which Josh was not aborted after all:

Erica Kane hires Josh Madden to produce her talk show New Beginnings. Josh lines up his father, Greg Madden, a well-known fertility expert, to be one of the first guests. Erica can’t place where she had met Dr. Madden until a bizarre series of events reveals that Dr. Madden had not only performed her abortion a few years back but developed a creepy obsession with her and implanted her aborted embryo into his own wife using a revolutionary new technique. Can it really happen? There are so many things wrong with this, I can’t even wrap my brain around it. The biggest hurdle with this particular storyline is that the techniques by which abortion is performed don’t exactly lend themselves to excising an embryo viable enough to survive in another woman's womb.

However, in their same article, Inkling Magazine stated that "[u]sing Erica Kane's currently known offspring as an example, it seems that the science behind the drama of soap storylines isn’t entirely incorrect" and that "maybe that's not as surprising as it seems. A lot of weird and crazy things pop up in scientific and medical research."

Who, for example, would have thought you could grow a human ear on the back of a mouse? Who would have believed that one day we could make fluorescent green pigs? Keeping in mind those miracles of nature might help suspend the disbelief the next time a pint-sized, ringlet-haired child soap star 'grows' into a sultry brooding teenager after a summer 'away.' Hey, it could happen."
