= Amanda Dillon =

Character in All My Children

- All My Children character
- Chrishell Stause as Amanda Dillon
- Portrayed by: Alexis Manta (1996–2000); Chrishell Stause (2005–2011); (and others)
- Duration: 1992–2000; 2005–2011
- First appearance: May 14, 1992
- Last appearance: September 23, 2011
- Created by: Agnes Nixon
- Introduced by: Felicia Minei Behr (1992); Julie Hanan Carruthers (2005)
In-universe information
- Other names: Amanda Martin
- Occupation: Former Employee of Chandler Enterprises; Former Model for Fusion Cosmetics; Former Personal assistant at Fusion Cosmetics; Former Personal assistant at New Beginnings
- Parents: Trevor Dillon; Janet Dillon
- Adoptive mother: Natalie Marlowe
- Half-brothers: Tim Dillon (adoptive)
- Spouse: Jake Martin (2009–)
- Sons: Trevor Martin
- Grandmothers: Wilma Marlowe
- Aunts: Arlene Vaughan; Natalie Marlowe
- First cousins: Hayley Vaughan; Tim Dillon; Enzo Santos (once removed)

Amanda Dillon is a fictional character from the American daytime television soap opera All My Children. She is the daughter of police officer/detective Trevor Dillon and longtime series villain Janet Marlowe aka "Janet from Another Planet"; however, Amanda was thought to be the child of her aunt Natalie Marlowe, who later adopted her. Alexis Manta portrayed the character as a child from 1996–2000, and Chrishell Stause has portrayed the character as an adult from 2005 till the end of the series in 2011. Stause's version of Amanda started out a scheming, seductive troublemaker, but later matured into a warmer, kinder person due to her relationship with Jake Martin.

== Storylines ==
Amanda's mother, Janet, changes her insane ways and tries to be more like Natalie. During her childhood years, Amanda becomes friends with Jamie Martin and JR Chandler. The Dillon family later move to Colorado. Amanda decides to move back in May 2005 to attend school at Pine Valley University. She also gets mixed up in JR and Jamie's business, looking for a man who can provide for her financially, much to the chagrin of Babe Carey, JR's ex-wife and Jamie's girlfriend. JR tells Amanda to separate them, and she agrees. Eventually, Babe breaks up with Jamie when Phoebe Tyler Wallingford dies and leaves her money to Jamie if he breaks up with Babe. Amanda makes her move, but it is not long before Jamie catches on and dumps her.

Janet comes to town when Amanda is hospitalized after being hit by JR, though Babe claims she was behind the wheel. Following Amanda's accident, several incidents occur; Babe is pushed down the stairs, Kendall Hart is found dangling on the roof, the Chandler Thanksgiving soup is poisoned, and Adam Chandler III (Little Adam) is kidnapped. Amanda is afraid that she is responsible, and confides in Josh Madden about it. Josh takes advantage and drugs Erica Kane and frames Amanda for it. Amanda realized Janet was responsible for the incidents, but kept quiet for her mother's sake. When she is arrested for drugging Erica, Janet decides to take her revenge at Erica's Mardi Gras ball. Amanda gets out, but is too late. The Mardi Gras ball explodes, killing Ethan Cambias.

Janet kidnaps Babe and her son, Little Adam, while Amanda does her best to help JR, Jamie, Tad Martin, and Aidan Devane find them. Eventually, they track Janet down, but after Babe and Little Adam are rescued, Tad and Aidan have to tell Amanda that Janet had killed her father, Trevor. Amanda is devastated by this loss, and does not know how to cope. Later, Brooke English, Jamie's mother, opens her house to her in order to help her recover.

Amanda rebounds months later, getting a job at Fusion Cosmetics and even building a friendship with Babe. She starts a "friends with benefits" (occasionally sexual) relationship with Jonathan Lavery. Eventually, she starts to develop feelings for him. However, he is still in love with his ex-wife, Lily Montgomery, and Amanda realizes that she cannot be a casual partner anymore, breaking things off with him. When Babe's life is threatened by the Satin Slayer, Amanda goes to her mother for help in figuring out who the killer is. Later, Janet is manipulated by Adam Chandler into kidnapping Babe's sister, Jenny Martin. Amanda once again gets caught in Janet's insanity and tries to convince her mother to give Jenny back to her parents, Tad and Krystal Carey. Later, Jenny is rescued with some help from Jamie and Babe.

Amanda eventually begins a relationship with Jake Martin, but they keep their relationship mostly physical. When Jake is conflicted between Amanda and Taylor Thompson (another romantic interest), Amanda breaks things off. Babe dies in the tornado disaster that hits Pine Valley, which hurts Amanda further. Babe's scheming father, David Hayward, wants to get custody of Little Adam from his father, JR. He pays Amanda to get JR to start drinking again. Amanda succeeds, but she regrets it later, and tells David to keep his distance.

When Amanda finds out that she is pregnant, she is not sure if David or JR is the father. Jake comes back, and becomes a friend to her when she needs help. In addition, her co-worker, Randi, and Randi's husband, Dr. Frankie Hubbard, assist her when she figures out that David is the father of her baby and is desperate to keep him away. Jake is there for her to help fend off David, and the two of them eventually fall in love; they get married on June 11, 2009.

Amanda's son is born while she and Jake are on their honeymoon. They both hatch a scheme to let David think the baby died so that he will not interfere in the baby's life. Meanwhile, Jake gives the baby to his ex-girlfriend, Liza Colby. Later, it is revealed that Jake has actually hidden the baby away in a country house with a nanny and gave Liza another baby put up for adoption. Amanda named her son, Trevor, after her father.

Amanda plans to find Trevor abandoned and to adopt him as her own. However, her scheme falls apart when Randi takes the baby, having just miscarried her own, and David finds the baby before she and Jake can. For months afterward, David makes her life miserable, forcing her to move in with him and Trevor, or he will take sole custody of him. He deliberately tries to break apart Jake and Amanda's marriage as well, while Amanda fights to preserve her marriage.

David's blackmail comes apart in January 2010, when Amanda had Trevor tested for a blood disease David claimed to have. When it comes back negative, Amanda has a paternity test done and discovers Jake is Trevor's biological father. Amanda kicks David out, and she, Jake, and Trevor get their lives back together, finally becoming the family they always dreamed of.

Amanda goes to work at Fusion as a model. In the process of gaining fame, she gains a stalker named "Amandafan." The stalker later turns out to be Janet, who breaks out of the mental institution, determined to be a part of her daughter and grandson's lives. She is caught and sent back, but Amanda questions her own ability as a mother because of her mother's insanity. Jake tries to reassure her that she is a great mother. On their first wedding anniversary, he throws Amanda the wedding of her dreams in a vow renewal ceremony, helping her regain her confidence.

Amanda and Jake are able to stay strong when they face serious situations with friends, such as Angie Hubbard losing her eyesight and Greenlee Smythe going on trial for the supposed murder of David (Greenlee's husband at the time). It later turns out that he faked his death. Amanda becomes a friend to Annie Lavery when Annie feels like her life is beginning to fall apart. However, when Jake's ex-wife, Cara Finn, comes to town, along with Griffin Castillo, the man who Cara left Jake for, Amanda is not happy about this and tries to act friendly towards Cara to keep an eye on her. It is later revealed that Griffin is actually Cara's brother. Amanda begins to wonder if Jake is affected by this more than he has let on.

Eventually, when Cara decides to stay in Pine Valley, Amanda begins to desire for her to leave and calls INS to report that Cara has been living in Pine Valley with a fraudulent passport. However, she later discovers from Tad that Cara is being pursued by a gang of drug dealers; thus, Tad, Jake, and Griffin are conspiring to fake Cara's death to save her life. Horrified and guilt-ridden, Amanda calls INS back in an attempt to cancel her passport concern, but the damage is already done; a group of Homeland security agents arrive at the hospital to arrest Cara for passport fraud.

Tad claims that he and Cara are engaged to keep her safe. Jake eventually finds out that Amanda called INS and is upset, but he does not know how to help assure Amanda either. Tad and Cara marry on March 8, 2011, right after Cara finds out and yells at Amanda for turning her in. Amanda ends up drunk at ConFusion before being taken home by JR. Eventually, she gets a job at Chandler Enterprises to help keep her busy.

Several issues arise with Jake and Cara, when Griffin is arrested for murder, attacked in his cell, then disappears from the hospital during a false fire alarm. Amanda finds out Jake lied about Griffin's condition to keep him in the hospital and out of jail, and is upset he is risking his job for his ex-wife. To try to get Jake back, Amanda throws away her birth control pills.

Amanda becomes suspicious of Jake when he starts to pull away from her, then shows up late to Lucy Hubbard's christening. She begins to think Jake and Cara slept together. When she gets proof, she is devastated and tells JR about what she found out. They end up sleeping together, and Amanda immediately regrets it. Later, she finds out Jake kissed Cara, but he didn't sleep with her, making her feel even more guilty.

Though Amanda wants to tell Jake about her infidelity, JR tells her not to. However, she soon after begins to feel dizzy and nauseous, and is afraid she might be pregnant with JR's baby. She goes in for a test, which comes back negative, but Cara later tells her there's a chance she might have an STD, worrying Amanda. The subsequent test comes back positive, and Amanda panics about how she's going to tell Jake about her STD.

Amanda finds out she has HPV, which could cause cervical cancer. She eventually tells Jake about the STD to help protect him, and also informs him of her affair with JR. When she explains the circumstances that led up to it, Jake says he'll forgive her, but Amanda is still guilt-ridden and walks away. Worried about what could happen, she tells Jake to move on with his life and take care of Trevor if something happens to her. Jake, though, tells her he is going to stay by her side and help her fight against cancer if she does have it, making his decision to stay with her.

Amanda has subsequent tests run, which prove that she does have cervical cancer. Jake stays by her side when she gets the diagnosis and talks about treatment options. Amanda also makes peace with Cara, who understands Amanda's battle as she had cancer when she was a child.

Amanda decides to have a hysterectomy done to stop the cancer from spreading. While she is getting ready for this, Janet is admitted to the hospital after Oak Haven is burned down and she sustains burn injuries from the fire. She lets her mother know about the cancer diagnosis. Surprisingly, Janet is the one who gives Amanda the advice to help give her the courage to keep fighting. Amanda goes in for surgery and Jake promises to be there when she comes out. Though not able to have any more children, Jake promises Amanda they will look at adoption. Amanda finds out the cancer is gone and she's okay. She and Jake slowly rebuild their life after everything they dealt with in the last year. Jake and Amanda find out Dixie Cooney is still alive and try to help her recover again. Jake and Amanda begin looking at going through with an adoption, optimistic about starting a family together.
