= Catherine Gardner =

American actress (born 1982)

- Born: Catherine Grace Gardner
- Parent: Maryann Gardner

Catherine Grace Gardner is an American actress. She is most commonly known for her major role as Rosa Santos in the television soap opera All My Children.

== Career ==
Gardner made her acting debut in a production of Annie in Watertown, Connecticut. In the 1990s, Gardner performed with Catherine Gardner & Co., a singing and dancing troupe. She was also featured as a guest star on the television series Law & Order, NYPD Blue, and Third Watch.

Gardner is also a stage actress who toured with Cathy Rigby in the Broadway musical Annie Get Your Gun. In addition to her television and stage credits, Gardner has been featured in commercials such those for as Lay's potato chips, Lucent Technologies, and AT&T. She has a passion for travel, and a desire to explore cultures.

Gardner remains active in hosting television programs for The Learning Channel, Nickelodeon, and national telethons including the Variety Club Telethon. She has sung and performed for Tan Keng Yam Tony, President of Singapore, to celebrate the 50th anniversary of MINDS, and continues to perform worldwide for various events.

Gardner is an editor for authors who have been given sentimental forewords of text by a Nobel Peace Laureate, Professor Muhammed Yunnus, including Splendours of the Past, The Bangladesh Sundarbans, and Boats: A Treasure of Bangladesh.

She produced the film The Speech starring Brian Gaskill.

== Filmography ==
=== Television ===
Year	Title	Role	Notes
1992	Law & Order	Felice Ortega	Episode: "Prince of Darkness"
1996–1998	All My Children	Rosa Santos	4 episodes
1998	NYPD Blue	Nina Nuñez	Episode: "Top Gum"
2004	Third Watch	Anne Bruno	Episode: "Sins of the Fathers"
2020	The Hidden House	Mrs. Gordon	Television film
2020	Personville: Secrets of a Small Town	Mrs. Gordon	Television film

== See also ==
- List of All My Children characters
