= Kate Collins (actress) =

American actress (born 1959)

- Born: May 6, 1959 (age 67); Boston, Massachusetts, U.S.
- Occupation: Actress
- Spouse: Charles Newell (m. 1992)
- Children: 2
- Parents: Michael Collins (father); Patricia Collins née Finnegan (mother)

Kate Collins (born May 6, 1959) is an American actress. She is best known for playing the character of Natalie Marlowe on the ABC soap opera All My Children from 1985 to 1992 on a regular basis. From 1991 to 1992 and again from 2005 to 2007 and 2010 to 2011, Collins also portrayed Natalie's sister Janet Green. In 1997 and 2001, she appeared as Natalie's spirit for short-term story arcs.

== Early life and education ==
Collins was born in Boston, Massachusetts, and raised in Washington D.C. She is the eldest child of astronaut Michael Collins, who served as Command Module Pilot on the historic Apollo 11 mission (the first human Moon landing) in 1969, and Patricia Collins née Finnegan. She graduated from National Cathedral School and studied theater at Northwestern University, graduating in 1981.

== Career ==
After college, she worked in a number of regional theater groups and appeared in off-Broadway productions of The Danube, Blood Moon and Clarissa. In 1990, she starred in the soap opera spoof theatrical play Quiet on the Set.

Collins has guest starred on the daytime soap operas One Life to Live, Guiding Light, Search for Tomorrow and Another World. She was cast for All My Children in 1985 during her performances in the Broadway play Doubles. She left All My Children in 1992, and the role was recast with Melody Anderson. The character was subsequently killed off on June 22, 1993. Collins returned to the show in 1997, 1998, and 2001 as Natalie's "spirit." She also played the role of Natalie's mentally ill sister, Janet Green, from 1991 to 1992 and 2005 to 2007, and again in 2010 and 2011.

Collins also guest-starred on L.A. Law and co-hosted Good Morning America in 1989, where she substituted for regular host Joan Lunden.

== Personal life ==
She married Charles Newell, who is the artistic director of the Court Theatre in Chicago in October 1992. They have two sons and live in Hyde Park, Chicago.

== Filmography ==
=== Film ===
Year	Title	Role	Notes
1987	Riot on 42nd St.	Michelle Owens	

=== Television ===
Year	Title	Role	Notes
1985–2011	All My Children	Natalie Marlowe / Janet Marlowe	259 episodes
1989	Good Morning America	—N/a	1 episode; guest host
1993	L.A. Law	Judith Craig	Episode: "That's Why the Lady Is a Stamp"
2021	Cavuto Live	Daughter of Astronaut Michael Collins	1 episode
