= Jesse Hubbard (All My Children) =

- All My Children character
- Portrayed by: Darnell Williams
- Duration: 1981–88; 1994; 2001–02; 2008–11; 2013
- First appearance: January 3, 1981
- Last appearance: September 2, 2013
- Created by: Agnes Nixon; Wisner Washam
In-universe information
- Occupation: former Chief of Police; Criminology professor at Pine Valley University; Busboy in Denver, Colorado; Member of the Pine Valley Town Council; Co-Owner of the Steam Pit nightclub; Camera shop employee; Police officer; Singer; Busboy at Foxy's
- Parents: Lionel Hubbard; Eleanor Grant
- Half-brothers: Eugene Hubbard
- Spouse: Angie Hubbard (1983–88, 2008–)
- Sons: Frankie Hubbard
- Daughters: Natalia Fowler Ellie Hubbard
- Adoptive daughters: Lucy Hubbard (foster)
- Stepdaughters: Cassandra Foster
- Grandsons: William Hubbard
- Aunts and uncles: Frank Grant
- First cousins: Jacob Foster; Carl Blair-Grant (adoptive)
- Other relatives: Randi Morgan Hubbard; Nancy Grant

Jesse Hubbard is a fictional character on the long-running ABC and The Online Network soap opera All My Children and half of the Jesse and Angie supercouple. He has been portrayed by Darnell Williams since the character's inception in 1981 and continued until the character's "death" in 1988. He returned for special guest appearances in 1994, 2001, and 2002. Williams returned to the role in 2008 when it was revealed that Jesse was alive. He is the father of Frankie Hubbard, Natalia Fowler, Ellie Hubbard, and Lucy Hubbard.

== Storylines ==
=== Arrival and Angie Baxter ===
Jesse Hubbard was a high school drop out spending most of his time at Foxy's when he met Jenny Gardner. Jenny was able to break his rough boy exterior to reveal someone who wanted to regain control of his life. Jenny agreed to help him catch up with his studies if he re-enrolled in high school.

Jesse took up his uncle Frank Grant's offer to move in with him in Pine Valley. All was going well when he accidentally left a lit cigarette, almost burning down the Grant home.

Frank introduced Jesse to a candy striper at the Pine Valley Hospital. Her name was Angie Baxter. Their first meeting was full of tension as they clashed. But their aggression gave way to passion. They began dating as the new school year started at Pine Valley University

Jesse grew tired of Liza Colby's incessant need to embarrass Jenny. Jenny left town after Liza threatened to reveal her father's crimes to Greg Nelson. Jesse went to confront Liza who told Jesse it was none of his business. When Jesse threatened to tell Greg the truth about Jenny's departure, Liza called out rape. Jesse was a wanted man. He made his way to New York to hide with Jenny. He got there just in time as an adult movie producer was accosting Jenny. Jesse and Jenny agreed to stand by each other and somehow find their way back to their loved ones in Pine Valley.

When Jesse did make it back to Pine Valley, he was spotted by Silver Kane who turned him in for Liza's rape. The trial forced Jenny to come home and confront Liza. Liza admitted the truth, and Jesse was set free. He began dating Angie again, much to the distaste of her father, Les Baxter.

Jesse mourned Frank's sudden death a stroke.

Jesse and Angie's relationship was finally on track. The loving couple had issues with intimacy. Angie had long decided to keep herself until marriage. But Jesse could not wait. He proposed to Angie, who in the rush of the marriage accepted. They quickly eloped, and shared their first night of passion together.

Things became estranged between husband and wife. Angie asked Jesse for a quickie divorce. Soon, he would learn Angie had left him because she was pregnant. He wanted to raise their son together, but Angie's father, Les Baxter, had already arranged for the child to be adopted.

Angie and Jesse teamed up to find their son. They kidnapped the boy from his adoptive family and waited in Sea City for things to blow over. Jesse named his son Frank Hubbard, after his late uncle. Angie and Jessie remarried in front of the Justice of the Peace. But marital bliss was not to be, as the couple was wanted on kidnapping charges.

The kidnapping charges against the Hubbards were dropped. Jesse and Angie had a hard time making ends meet. They decided to invest with the Nelson in the Steampit Nightclub. Only, Jesse could not find his part of the seed money and took a loan with a loneshark named Murray. When Jesse could not pay him back, Murray took control of the Steampit.

Jesse got a frantic call to go to Pine Valley Hospital. He arrived in time to see Jenny on the brink of death. Jesse had just enough time to say goodbye to his best friend.

Jesse pursued a singing career with a duet partner, Yvonne Caldwell. Yvonne was not content to just be Jesse's singing partner. She lured him into his bed. Jesse thought his marriage was over. The presence of Jesse's half-brother, Eugene Hubbard, did not help. Eugene pressured Jesse to return to his old ways and leave his new life in Pine Valley behind. Alas, Jesse turned back to his family.

Eugene framed Jesse for a theft at the hospital. Jesse defended himself, finding evidence to implicate Eugene. At the close of the trial, the police offered Jesse a spot on the force because of his intrepid detective skills.

Angie admitted that she had been sexually harassed at Medical School. Jesse admitted to his infidelity. Eugene and Yvonne both left Pine Valley, leaving the Hubbards to pick up the pieces of their broken families.

Jesse and Angie's marriage met another roadblock when Yvonne returned to Pine Valley, pregnant with his child. Only, Jesse knew he and Yvonne never slept together. Angie and Jesse cared for Yvonne. She admitted that she had lied about the child's paternity. She decided to put the child up for adoption. But when she changed her mind, Jesse stumbled on an underground baby selling ring operating out of Pine Valley.

Jesse worked with Travis Montgomery to entrap the crime lord in charge of the ring, "Mr. Big." Jesse was shocked to see Mr. Big was Les Baxter. Les confronted Jesse with a gun. They fought over the weapon when Angie arrived. Jesse overpowered Les, and he plummeted to his death down a staircase. Jesse was a hero to everyone in Pine Valley, except for Angie. She asked him to move out.

Jesse was concerned when Angie took in Cindy Parker, a woman with HIV. He worried about Angie and Frankie's health. Angie assured him they were all safe. Angie broke the news to Cindy: she had AIDS. Angie called on Jesse for support

=== Death and afterlife ===
Jesse's life on the force put him in the line of fire. While pursuing a criminal named Remy Remington, Jesse took a fatal gunshot in the torso. Jesse hung on long enough to tell Angie how much he loved her

In 1994, a vision of Jesse's spirit visited Tad Martin while he lay in a coma. Jesse told Tad it was not yet his time to die.

Jesse's spirit was among the many former Pine Valley residents that welcomed Gillian Andrassy to Heaven. But Gillian was not ready to die. She tried to make her back to Earth when Natalie Marlowe caught her. Natalie agreed to let Gillian go back to Earth if she completed a task. Jesse was to supervise her. But Gillian was quiet the handful.

Jesse took the reprieve from Heaven as his own opportunity to check in on his loved ones. He realized Tad needed his help more than ever. He was on the run for a murder he did not commit and on the outs with his wife, Dixie. Jesse helped Tad to not give up hope for the sake of his family.

In 2002, Frank turned to Jesse's spirit on his first day as doctor at Pine Valley Hospital.

=== Return, reuniting with Angie, and Natalia Fowler ===
After years on the run, Jesse came back to Pine Valley after learning Frankie was on the brink of death. Jesse had never died. He had been captured by a crime lord called the Papel. The Papel wrongfully believed Jesse was in possession of a rare diamond. In reality, he was targeting Remy who had hidden the diamond in a doll. Jesse was prepared to skip town when Tad caught him. Tad wanted to help Jesse stop running. Tad's wife, Krystal Martin, staged it so that Angie would see Jesse. Jesse decided to stay to fight for his family and his freedom.

The Papel turned out to be Robert Gardner, Ray's brother and Tad's uncle. He chose the night of Angie and Jesse's wedding to reveal himself. Jesse and Frankie subdued Robert after he went on a shooting tirade. With Robert in prison, Jesse was finally free to live his life.

Jesse took the job of Chief of Police much to Angie's chagrin. Angie wanted Jesse out of the line of danger. One of his first cases had him investigating Angie's daughter, Cassandra Foster, for the murder of Richie Novak. Angie and Jesse's marriage was strained because of Jesse's new job.

A mysterious woman named Natalie came to Pine Valley looking for Jesse. Jesse was hiding a secret. While in Toronto, Jesse had a child with the psychologist, Dr. Rebecca Fowler. Rebecca had helped Jesse recover after he escaped Robert's grasp. That child was Natalia. Jesse admitted the truth to Angie after Natalia needed surgery. He needed to sign Natalia's consent forms. Angie had a surprising reaction. She opened their home to Natalia and Rebecca. Rebecca had been diagnosed with a brain tumor. She did not want treatment. She just wanted to know Natalia would be taken care of when she died.

Rebecca has signed a "do not resuscitate" order, but when she went into cardiac arrest, Jesse and Natalie urged Angie to ignore the order and do whatever it took to save her. Angie initially refused, but eventually she succumbed to their wishes. Rebecca remained unconscious for a period of time, but when she regained consciousness she started to show signs of improvement. The improvement was short-lived. Rebecca would not live much longer and she went back to Denver and died. Jesse grieved for Rebecca and comforted Natalia, as she grieved for her mother.

Natalia remained in Pine Valley and joined the police department after the death of her mother. Jesse struggled to keep Natalia from finding out his secret—he had covered up a murder. Frankie's wife, Randi Hubbard, believed she had murdered Henry North, the district attorney. Randi was alone with Henry in a hotel room, and had defended herself against his physical advances. She had knocked Henry out.

Jesse covered up Randi's crime to protect his pregnant daughter-in-law. Madison North, Henry's widow, knew Randi had been in Henry's hotel room and was onto the Hubbard's cover-up. Randi suffered a miscarriage. Madison was interested in Frankie and tried to force him to divorce Randi. Jesse believed Madison had killed Henry and framed Randi. After Madison confessed, the Hubbards learned Madison's father had abused her, and they befriended her.

=== Angie's illness and Lucy Hubbard ===
Jesse received surprising news when Angie announced she was pregnant. Jesse was thrilled. His excitement was stifled when Angie explained she had contracted a viral infection in her eyes that caused blindness. She had not worn gloves while treating a patient, and had accidentally rubbed her eyes. The experimental medication to restore her vision would harm the baby, so Angie chose not to take it. Jesse struggled with Angie's choice, but in time he supported her decision.

Jesse learned the gender of the baby by accident because of an amniocentesis appointment. Angie knew he was keeping a secret, so he shared that they were having a girl. Before the baby arrived, Jesse took Angie on a romantic outing to their first house, and they repeated their wedding vows. Angie went into labor, and Jesse had to deliver the baby. He called for help, but no medical units could reach them in time.

Angie instructed Jesse until she passed out. The baby was stillborn. Jesse named the baby Ellie. Moments later, a police officer, Brot Monroe, arrived, but he did not arrive alone. A newborn baby girl had been abandoned in his squad car. When Angie regained consciousness, she heard the abandoned baby cry and assumed it was her daughter. Jesse could not bear to cause Angie pain, so he placed the abandoned baby in her arms. They named the baby Lucy.

Jesse quietly grieved Ellie while he worried Angie or someone else would discover Lucy was not their child. Angie admitted she would like to be able to see her daughter, even if it meant turning to David Hayward for help in treating her blindness. Jesse blamed David for Angie's blindness because Angie had been trying to conserve resources that were in short supply at the hospital, such as gloves, due to David Hayward's cutbacks. David claimed he had new research that might restore Angie's vision. Jesse was reluctant to have Angie accept help from David, but he agreed to stand by her decision.

== Reception ==
In 2024, Charlie Mason from Soaps She Knows placed Jesse and Angie at 14th and 13th place on his ranked list of Soaps' 40 Most Iconic Characters of All Time, writing, "Darnell Williams and Debbi Morgan not only gave us soaps' first Black supercouple, they gave us a couple that was so perfect, not even death could keep them apart for good".

== See also ==
- Jesse Hubbard and Angie Baxter
- All My Children
- Supercouple
- List of supercouples
