= Hannah Nichols =

- All My Children character
- Portrayed by: Stacy Haiduk
- Duration: 2007–08
- First appearance: March 27, 2007
- Last appearance: January 14, 2008
- Created by: Megan McTavish
In-universe information
- Occupation: Business woman
- Sons: Ethan Cambias

Hannah Nichols is a fictional character from the ABC soap opera All My Children, portrayed by Stacy Haiduk initially from March to May 2007 and again from September 2007 until January 14, 2008, when the character was killed off. Haiduk's portrayal marked the character's entire tenure on the show, spanning key storylines before the character was written out.

== Casting ==
The character was played by Stacy Haiduk, who initially appeared from March to May 2007. Haiduk enjoyed her time on the soap and enjoyed the flexibility of working in daytime television, telling her co-star Thorsten Kaye on her first day of filming, "This is so much fun. You guys are the luckiest people on earth because you get to have a life outside of work as well". At the end of her initial stint, Haiduk told All My Children executive producer Julie Hanan Carruthers that she would love to return to the soap. Haiduk was later invited to reprise the role later that year, which she felt "very blessed" about. Her return aired in September 2007.

== Storylines ==
Hannah is the mother of the Ethan Cambias, a child conceived from a teenage love affair with Zach Slater, then known as Alexander Cambias Jr. Upon giving birth to Ethan, she gives him up and he is adopted by Stanley and Edith Ramsey. Hannah comes to Pine Valley, but as time goes on, she realizes how much she missed when she gave Ethan up for adoption. She sleeps with Josh Madden in her office at Cambias, and starts a short relationship with him. She then makes a pregnancy plea to Zach, saying he owes her, and leaves Pine Valley afterwards. It is later confirmed that Zach did not grant her plea.

After returning to Pine Valley, Hannah starts working on an assignment given to her by Adam Chandler, pointed against Zach's company, which she later regrets doing. With Adam blackmailing her, Hannah works to get Adam his company back from Zach. She steals the company from Zach while he is preoccupied with getting Kendall Hart's legal affairs in order. She then gives Adam back his company and breaks off her relationship with him.

After hearing that Kendall has been sentenced to community service, Hannah attempts to shoot her while she is partying at Greenlee Smythe's apartment. While her bullet misses Kendall, it hits Ryan Lavery instead. While Zach is searching for Hannah, she runs into Sean Montgomery, whom she takes back to her hotel room and sleeps with. She then goes off to the cliffs (the same cliffs where Leo du Pres and Vanessa Bennett died) where Zach finds her. She shares memories with Zach of his father raping her while Zach was at school. Zach tries to comfort her, but she steps away from him and both of them slip at the edge of the cliff, now hanging on for life. Zach vows to save her and asks her to hold on to him tightly. Aidan Devane, Kendall and Greenlee rush to where the two are and try to pull them up to safety.

As Zach tells Hannah that he is sorry for the awful things that happened to her and pleads for her to believe him, Hannah makes it clear that she forgives him. Zach professes his love to a frantic Kendall to calm her down, and as he does, Hannah tells Zach that it is okay, seemingly realising how deep his love for Kendall goes. Looking down and surmising the situation, Hannah tells him that everything is as it should be. Sensing that they will both die if they go any longer in their current state, she says, "Let's go," and presumably falls to her death. Zach is pulled to safety but he is distraught over Hannah's death.

== Reception ==
Mara Levinsky from Soap Opera Digest called Hannah "unstable". Deanna Barnert from Woman's World opined that Hannah "schemed and sacrificed herself in the name of love".
