= Zach Slater =

- All My Children character
- Portrayed by: Thorsten Kaye
- Duration: 2004–2011; 2013
- First appearance: May 20, 2004
- Last appearance: September 2, 2013
- Created by: Megan McTavish
- Introduced by: Julie Hanan Carruthers (2004); Ginger Smith (2013)
In-universe information
- Other names: Alexander Cambias, Jr.
- Occupation: Business operator
- Parents: Alexander Cambias; Amelia Cambias
- Brothers: Michael Cambias
- Wife: Kendall Hart (2005–2012)
- Sons: Ethan Cambias; Ian Slater
- Daughters: Gabrielle Montgomery
- Nieces: Miranda Montgomery

Zach Slater is a fictional character from the American drama, All My Children. He was portrayed by actor Thorsten Kaye from May 20, 2004 to November 19, 2010; Thorsten returned to the role on August 5, 2011 to September 23, 2011. In 2006, the character was reported by newspaper Chicago Sun-Times as one of the male television character romantically desired by their female readers, and is considered one of television's anti-heroes. On April 30, 2013, Kaye reprised the role of Zach for the continuation of All My Children. In October 2013, Kaye announced he would not be returning for the second season of the series, instead taking on the role of Ridge Forrester on The Bold and the Beautiful.

== Storylines ==
=== 2004–11 ===
Born Alexander Cambias, Jr., Zach was mistreated by his father and made to believe that he was responsible for his mother's death. At age 18, he faked his own death and started a new life as Zach Slater, going on to own a thriving casino business in Las Vegas where he befriended Erica Kane, when she was on the run after becoming the suspect for the murder of Zach's brother Michael Cambias (who raped and impregnated her daughter Bianca Montgomery) and Zach offered her a contract to work as a showgirl at his casino while he kept an eye on Erica and researched everything about her family and her history in Pine Valley. He later moved to Pine Valley to try to reunite with his old flame Maria Santos. Zach then married Erica's daughter, Kendall Hart, for a pretense, but later they fell in love. Shortly after that, in 2010, Zach was presumed dead in a plane crash brought on by his casino partners, who were stealing from him. In July 2011, Griffin told Ryan that David Hayward's Orpheus Project could have brought Zach back to life. It turns out to be true. Greenlee finds out that Zach is alive, and goes with them to rescue him. Zach wakes up and thinks that Greenlee is Kendall, and tells her that after they leave this room, that they cannot be together. Greenlee struggles to convince Zach that she is Greenlee, not Kendall. Greenlee and Ryan and David rushed Zach to Pine Valley's hospital where is he reunited with Kendall.

=== 2013 ===
On April 30, 2013, Jesse Hubbard calls Zach when video evidence shows that Jesse's missing daughter Cassandra got into a car registered in Zach's casino while she was at the airport, returning to Pine Valley from Paris. The following day, Zach returns to town and promises to help Jesse find Cassandra without letting Angie know. He soon learns that Cassandra may be involved in a human trafficking ring. On May 1, 2013, Zach reveals that he and Kendall divorced while the show was off the air, because the Russian Mob wanted a piece of his casino, and Kendall was sick of living in fear, wanting her sons to be safe.

== Significant events synopsis ==
- Alexander "Alex" Cambias, Jr. (name at birth) was born in 1966
- Faked his death in 1984 at the age of 18* Changed his name (and identity) to Zach Slater (assumed name)
- presumed dead from November 2010 to August 2011; brought back from the dead by Dr. David Hayward.
- His son, Ethan Cambias (died in 2006), was his son with Hannah Nichols. Ethan was adopted by Stanley and Edith Ramsey. Ethan struggled for control over Cambias Industries.

== See also ==
- Zach Slater and Kendall Hart
