= Fay Wolf =

American singer-songwriter

- Occupations: Actress, singer, songwriter, pianist, professional organizer
- Years active: 2000–present
- Website: www.faywolf.com www.faywolfmusic.com

Fay Wolf is an American actress, singer, songwriter, pianist, and professional organizer.

== Career ==
Wolf has appeared in many television shows such as All My Children, Numb3rs, and NCIS: Los Angeles. Some of her songs have been used in The Vampire Diaries, Grey's Anatomy, One Tree Hill, Covert Affairs, and Pretty Little Liars. Fay's cover for The Outfield's "Your Love" was used exclusively for the Pretty Little Liars Soundtrack in 2011 with a music video released in 2012. In 2009 Wolf released her first EP, Blankets. In 2011 she released her first full-length album, Spiders," funded by a successful Kickstarter campaign. Wolf has since released several singles.

== Organization career ==
Wolf is also a professional organizer/decluttering pro. She owns and runs a company called New Order. Wolf hosts workshops and works with creative clients to inspire and assist with both the "inner and outer clutter." Her first book New Order: A Decluttering Handbook For Creative Folks (And Everyone Else) was released by Ballantine/Random House in 2016. A Spanish version of became available in 2019. She has worked with Apartment Therapy as an expert for many years. Wolf gave a keynote speech at Etsy's conference in 2016 and has contributed to several publications.

== Filmography ==
Film
Year	Film	Role
2000	"All My Children"	Leila Hannon (2 Appearances)
2001	"Law & Order"	Carla Burns
2002	"The Education of Max Bickford: The Pursuit of Happiness"	Second Student
2002	"The Guiding Light"	Sunny Adelman
2003	"Just Another Story"	Jewels
2003	"Chappelle's Show"	Sheila's Friend
2005	"Numb3rs"	Kyono
2006	"Bones"	Marni Hunter
2008	"Terminator: The Sarah Connor Chronicles"	Agent Lila Ellison (2 Appearances)
2008	"Ghost Whisperer"	Marlee
2009	"Rose by Any Other Name"	Veronica
2009	"NCIS: Los Angeles"	Delores
2009	"Off the Ledge"	Fuck Off Chick
2010	"You, Me, and We"	Fay
2010	"Happythankyoumoreplease"	Beth
2010	"Grey's Anatomy"	Song: "Yours"
2010	"One Tree Hill"	Song: "God Knows"
2010	"Ordinary Girl"	Sydney
2010	"Miami Medical"	Nurse Albers
2010	"Covert Affairs"	Song: "The Beginning of Anne"
2011	"Children's Hospital"	Mom
2011	"Pretty Little Liars"	Song: "God Knows"
2011	"Pretty Little Liars"	Song: "Your Love" (cover)
2012	"Dog Eat Dog"	Actress
2012	"Say It Ain't Solo"	Herself
2012	"Vampire Diaries"	Song: "The Thread of the Thing"
2012	"Beside Her"	Song: "The Thread of the Thing"
2012	"2 Broke Girls: And the Secret Ingredient (# 1.13)"	Rhya
2013	"Holy Ghost People"	Song: "The Thread of the Thing"
2013	"The Carrie Diaries"	Song: "Like A Virgin" (cover)
2014	"The Fosters"	Song: "Was"
2015	"Chasing Life"	Herself
2018	"Superstore"	Kristy
2019	"Unbelievable"	Jeanette
2019	TheirBnb	Dana
2020	The Offer	Madrid
2022	Devil in Ohio	Madeleine Arthur
