= Janet Green (All My Children) =

- All My Children character
- Kate Collins as Janet Green (2007)
- Portrayed by: Kate Collins (1991–1992, 2005–2011); Melody Anderson (1993); Robin Mattson (1994–2000)
- Duration: 1991–2000; 2005–2007; 2010–2011
- First appearance: May 24, 1991
- Last appearance: September 23, 2011
- Created by: Agnes Nixon
- Introduced by: Felicia Minei Behr
- Robin Mattson as Janet Green (1997)
In-universe information
- Other names: Janet Marlowe; Janet Green; Natalie Dillon; Jane Cox; Janet from Another Planet; The Crowbar Killer
- Mother: Wilma Marlowe
- Sisters: Natalie Marlowe
- Spouse: Axel Green (1985–1990); Trevor Dillon (1991, 1998–2005)
- Daughters: Amanda Dillon
- Grandsons: Trevor Martin
- Nephews: Tim Dillon

Janet Green (also Marlowe and Dillon) is a fictional character that appeared on the daytime soap opera, All My Children. She is commonly known for terrorizing the residents of Pine Valley, including her sister Natalie Marlowe and the murder of Will Cortlandt. Janet frequently has bouts of psychosis resulting from emotional abuse inflicted upon her since childhood. While experiencing psychosis, she frequently hallucinates two-way conversations with her reflection in the mirror. The hallucination looks as the character did when first introduced; homely with dark hair and glasses. Its responses are consistently critical of Janet and while it does provide her with solutions to current obstacles, the solutions are often illegal and something a reasonable individual would not consider. As a result of her mental illness and erratic behavior, the character was sometimes referred to as Janet from Another Planet.

Janet has had extended periods of sanity. She and her psyche have been studied within scholarly contexts.

The role was originated in 1991 by Kate Collins, who had also portrayed Janet's sister, Natalie on the series since 1985. Collins played both characters until she left All My Children in 1992 and her replacement in the role of Natalie Melody Anderson, portrayed Janet for one day in 1993. With the character of Natalie being killed off, Robin Mattson played Janet from 1994 to May 9, 2000, during which time the character underwent a transformation of sorts, reforming from her criminal past, finding friendship, mental stability and love. After Mattson's tenure, Collins reprised the role several times, with each occurrence lasting a couple of months.
