= Marick =

Marick may refer to:

== Fictional characters ==
- Alex Devane Marick, fictional character on the soap opera All My Children (1999–2001)
- Dimitri Marick, fictional character from the ABC daytime drama All My Children
- Dimitri Marick and Erica Kane, fictional characters and a supercouple from All My Children
- Marik Ishtar, fictional character from the Yu-Gi-Oh! franchise

== Other ==
- Marick Press, non-profit publishing house founded in Grosse Pointe Park, Michigan, in 2005
