= Erica Kane and Dimitri Marick =

Fictional characters in the soap opera All My Children

Erica Kane (Susan Lucci) and Dimitri Marick (Michael Nader).

Erica Kane and Dimitri Marick are fictional characters and a supercouple from the ABC daytime drama All My Children. Erica is portrayed by Susan Lucci, and Dimitri was portrayed by Michael Nader. Sometimes referred to as a "stormy duo" these two carried out a tumultuous relationship spanning the nineties. While they had their share of antagonists speckled throughout their romance, the main roadblock always keeping them apart were their own equally stubborn and fierce personalities.

The couple is regarded as one of the greatest in soap opera history by Entertainment Weekly. Though Erica has been married many times and has had several men over the years, her relationship with Dimitri is considered one of her most memorable and one of All My Children's most successful.

== Background ==
=== Writing and portrayals ===
Erica and Dimitri were not originally scripted into a romantic pairing with each other. Erica Kane was created in the 1960s as one of the original characters in Agnes Nixon's story bible for All My Children. Since the shows inception on January 5, 1970, Erica has had several love interests. It was not until twenty-one years after the soap opera began airing that she met Dimitri. The Dimitri Marick character was created in 1991 as a love interest for Natalie Marlowe. Even while he was engaged in a love triangle with Natalie and Trevor Dillon, there was speculation about a possible romance between Erica and Dimitri. These rumors were neither confirmed nor denied by Nixon. She did, however, confirm that Dimitri's story would eventually include Erica. At first the involvement was limited to each character's story being effected by the same catalysts and Erica commenting on Dimitri's relationship with Natalie.

Nixon later told Soap Opera Digest that she always planned on pairing Dimitri with Erica, but held off to see if they worked well together. "Long before their relationship started, viewers were saying that Erica and Dimitri belong together," she said. "They have great chemistry and are very alike, kindred spirits." Nixon wrote the beginning of the couple's story as a love-hate relationship where they both disliked each other. The dislike became an attraction that resulted in a "tug-of-war" type of story. "We can't even define it as a romance," Nader said. "It has to be defined as a positioning of players. Dimitri is very well aware that he has to dance a little dance with her." Nixon made the relationship different from Erica's other ones. In previous romances, she acted as the aggressor. In this one, Nixon positioned Dimitri as the one who pursued Erica and made the first sexual overtures. She also used the Erica and Dimitri relationship as a way of developing a new, more sexual side of Dimitri. Nader said, "There was a part of Dimitri that he never explored before because he married so young. A part of him shut down. But now, there is a whole other aspect of his sexual nature that has been awakened and Erica is about that. [He feels] a lot more fire with her."

Erica and Dimitri's relationship was scripted as passionate with a cycle of break ups and reconciliations. The tumultuous nature of their relationship drew comparisons between them and the real life supercouple Elizabeth Taylor and Richard Burton. Erica and Dimitri were also written as soulmates and the loves of each other's lives. Within the series, the writers played upon the theme of these characters being soulmates and in effect one being.

=== Location shoot ===
For a plot point in Dimitri and Erica's relationship, All My Children went on location in Budapest, Hungary. The show advertised the story in a campaign called "Destiny on the Danube". This campaign involved full page ads in magazines. Plans for the shoot began in January 1992 and the desired location was Russia. Former executive producer Felicia Minei Behr said, she "sent a crew in to Russia to see what kind of problems there would be. When it became apparent that it was not going to be able to be done because of a lot of recent problems getting shoots done in Russia, we started to look around for different locales. We had this grand story that Megan (McTavish, head writer) and Agnes (Nixon, executive head writer) had written, and we wanted to do it justice." Nixon suggested Budapest as the new location after hearing good things about the city from George Lang, the owner of Café des Artistes, who just opened a restaurant there.

The remote taped from September 17 to 21, 1992. The members of the cast who traveled to Budapest for the shoot included Lucci, Nader, John Callahan (Edmund), and Susan Willis (Helga). Behr put together an international crew for the shoot involving members from Germany, Canada, Tunisia, France, and Hungary. During the five days of filming, the show taped over an hour's worth of material. "The people in the motion picture industry over there could not believe the amount of work we got done in the amount of time," Behr said. One of the locations used on the shoot was Nagyteteny, a chateau located forty-five minutes outside Budapest. Nagyteteny provided the location for the Marick's ancestral home, Vadzel.

== Storyline ==
Erica Kane and Dimitri Marick fall in love while he is attempting a hostile takeover of her cosmetics company, Enchantment. They appear in a face-to-face meeting on TV's Market Street Week to debate. Afterwards, they meet privately and argue, at which point their animosity turns to passion and he pulls her into a kiss that she responds to. Their relationship cannot go further than that because he is married to Angelique Voynitzeva and she is in a loveless marriage to Adam Chandler. Dimitri pursues her despite these roadblocks. Erica turns down his advances, refusing to be anyone's mistress. Eventually he wears down her resistance and they begin an affair. He promises to divorce Angelique, but has a hard time doing so because she is not in the best of health. Once free of their spouses, Erica and Dimitri travel to Budapest in his native country, Hungary. While in Budapest, Erica is kidnapped twice. Once by Dimitri's estranged half brother, Edmund Grey, who wants to be acknowledged as a Marick. Then she is kidnapped by Helga, Angelique's mother, who wants to keep her daughter and Dimitri together. She locks Erica in Hugo Marick's crypt. Working together with Edmund, Dimitri rescues Erica and Helga falls to her death. Erica goes into a catatonic state requiring she be placed in Oak Haven, a mental institution in Pine Valley. Once Erica recovers, she and Dimitri plan to marry.

Soon before saying their "I do's" Erica finds out she has a daughter she conceived from rape at the age of fourteen, Kendall Hart. Erica tells Dimitri what happened all those years ago. This is the first time she told anyone besides Eric Kane and she is grateful he does not say she deserved it like her father did when she told him. They bring Kendall into their home as a part of their family. Despite this, Kendall hates her mother for putting her up for adoption and also becomes infatuated with Dimitri. She attempts to sabotage their wedding by burning Dimitri and Angelique's divorce papers. Dimitri's divorce still goes through and his wedding to Erica goes off without a hitch. The young woman wants to find her biological father which Erica is dead set against. Dimitri tries to help Kendall in her search, putting a strain on his marriage. Things heighten even further when Kendall makes sexual advances toward her stepfather and is turned down. Devastated and humiliated, she goes to her mother and lies that Dimitri raped her. Suffering from hallucinations of her own rape, Erica stabs her husband with a letter opener. Dimitri divorces Erica and wants her in prison for what she did but also admits he still loves her.

While they are apart, Erica starts up with Jackson Montgomery even though he is married to Laurel Banning at the time. As Erica models a wedding dress in New York City, Jack proposes to her on the runway. She accepts but soon reunites with Dimitri. In a surprise wedding set up by Edmund and Erica's younger daughter, Bianca Montgomery, Erica and Dimitri ring in 1995 as a married couple.

On another modeling shoot, Erica has an accident and suffers injuries to her back. With the help of Dr. Jonathan Kinder, she becomes addicted to the medication she takes for her injury. Dimitri tries to warn her about Jonathan, but she will not listen, thus putting a strain on their marriage again. While under the influence of the increasingly higher doses of drugs Jonathan gives her, Erica has sex with him. Her dependence on her supplier grows until she finally has to admit she has an addiction and checks herself into the Betty Ford Center. Once she is out, Erica and Dimitri start finding their way back to each other. This does not sit well with Jonathan. The doctor drugs Erica and tricks Dimitri into thinking they are still having sex. After seeing his wife in bed with another man, Dimitri files for divorce and finds comfort with an equally as devastated Maria Santos Grey. Erica has no idea what Jonathan did or why Dimitri is angry with her. Dimitri shuts her out and refuses to explain why he divorced her. Erica does not find out what happened until she and her new friends Janet Green and Skye Chandler (each of whom was wronged by Kinder) corner Jonathan and he confesses. He gets the upper hand on the women and is about to assault Erica when Dimitri comes to her rescue. Jonathan is sent to prison.

With Jonathan out of their lives, Erica and Dimitri reunite. He keeps quiet about his affair with Maria but soon finds out she is pregnant. They run a paternity test and the results say the baby is his. Unbeknownst to them, Skye Chandler, who is in love with Maria's husband Edmund, switched the test results. Erica also discovers she is pregnant with Dimitri's baby and the two plan to remarry. On the day that should be their third wedding, Erica collapses. She is rushed to the hospital where she finds out she had a miscarriage. The couple are determined to start a family together so they look into adoption. Before they get much further with their plans, Erica finds out about Dimitri's one-night stand with Maria and the child they supposedly conceived. She confronts Maria in a remote cabin where her rival goes into labor. Erica has to decide whether or not to help Maria. She does. After delivering the baby, Erica tries to take her to the hospital but her car goes off a bridge. Erica lives, however, the baby is presumed dead. Dimitri makes it clear that he still wants a future with Erica and that his affair with Maria was just a mistake. Erica makes it equally as clear that they are over, devastating Dimitri.

After Maria's baby is declared dead, Erica finds the little girl and tries to return her to Maria. When she gets to Wildwind, she overhears Maria and Dimitri discussing the baby and deciding the baby's death was for the best. Hearing this, Erica decides to pass the baby off as a child she adopts from Russia. Erica names the baby Sonya Kane. Dimitri sees this as another chance to have a family with Erica and wants to be a father to Sonya. Erica refuses to let him be a part of either of their lives. This makes Dimitri so angry he begins checking into Sonya's adoption. Tad Martin and Gloria Marsh are also looking into it. Losing Erica leads Dimitri to do very cruel things such as conning mentally challenged Stuart Chandler out of his television station, WRCW, in an attempt to get back at Erica for leaving him. She has a television show, the Cutting Edge, on that station. He also "kidnaps" and romantically pursues a very taken Gloria Marsh. While in a rage he accidentally hits Erica and baby Sonya with his car. Sonya is taken to the hospital where Maria gives her a check up and feels a connection with her. Eventually, Erica returns Sonya to Maria and is sent to prison for kidnapping. Maria is presumed dead not long afterward, leading to a custody battle between Dimitri and Edmund over the baby, now named Maddie Grey. Dimitri is awarded custody after a few dirty tricks such as drugging Edmund so he will look like an unfit parent. Even after Dimitri finds out he is not Maddie's father, he keeps the secret from his brother. To insure the secret does not get out, Dimitri threatens Skye and beats the lab technician who helped her switch the results. From behind bars, Erica finds out Dimitri is not Maddie's father and helps Edmund reunite with his daughter.

In return, Edmund helps her get released from prison so she can help her own daughter, Bianca, with her anorexia. Dimitri is also there for his former stepdaughter. At Bianca's intervention he admits he still loves Erica. Slowly, Erica and Dimitri work their way into becoming friends. He escorts her to the Crystal Ball in 1998 and they look to be on their way to a reconciliation. By the time Erica realizes she still loves him, he is presumed dead. During his funeral she talks about her and Dimitri as soul mates and acts as though she is his widow. Alexandra Devane Marick reveals that she married Dimitri during his trip to Europe. Erica does not believe Alex is the type of woman Dimitri would ever be with and doubts they were ever married.

He is later revealed to be alive and Erica faints upon seeing him. Once she regains consciousness, she cannot believe he is going to reunite with Alex even after Alex moved on with his own brother, Edmund. Erica's feelings for Dimitri continuously cause a rift in her relationship with her fiancée, David Hayward. She is furious when she finds out David knew Dimitri was alive and did not tell her. Eventually she breaks off their engagement. When Bianca "comes out" as a lesbian, Dimitri is there to stand by Erica and help her adjust to the revelation. Bianca is outed to the public by a reporter at the 2000 Crystal Ball, a ball held in memory of Maria. Afterwards Dimitri takes Erica back to the hunting lodge where they discuss Bianca's sexuality and reminisce on old times. Erica tells him that every man she has been with since him (Mike Roy, Jack, and David) pales in comparison to him. Despite this declaration Dimitri insists his life is with Alex now. Dimitri soon returns to Hungary with Alex.

== Recurring themes and motifs ==
=== Fairytale ===
Dimitri and Erica's romance has often been attributed to featuring fairy tale aspects. Erica on her own always acted like a "little princess" (as Nick Davis dubbed her). Though Dimitri is a Hungarian Count, he is sometimes referred to as a prince by Erica and the writers. This point was driven home by their location shoot in Budapest where they fell in love, with the city's Old World beauty as their backdrop. For their weddings All My Children made sure they did it up "in pure fairy-tale style in an elaborate wedding that took its cue from Dimitri's Hungarian ancestors." According to Carol Luiken (All My Children former costume designer), the show "wanted to do kind of a European princess design" for Erica's dress. The effect was so successful that "Erica looked more like a queen than a princess." The same idea was in mind for Erica's second wedding gown, dubbed "the Guenevere dress." Crowns were used for their second wedding ceremony which was done in a Russian Orthodox style. During their time together Erica and Dimitri have lived in two castles at one point or another. The first being Wildwind, his Pine Valley estate complete with a turret, which is used as a romantic symbol for another fairytale couple, Dimitri's cousin Princess Gillian Andrassy and her husband, Ryan Lavery. The second being Vadzel, the castle in Budapest, Hungary where they traveled early on in their relationship and shared their famous waltz in full Count Andrassy garb.

=== Hunting Lodge/Port in the storm ===
Wildwind's Hunting Lodge appeared frequently in Dimitri and Erica's story and is sometimes used as a symbol for their love. Its first appearance was in 1992 when Erica stumbled upon it during a storm and was stranded there with Dimitri. From that point until Dimitri left Pine Valley in 2001 it appeared repeatedly. In this place Dimitri forced Erica to admit her feelings for him and they had sex for the first time. He also gave her the lodge as a wedding present. Many times during their reign as a couple, the two of them came to the lodge for intimate moments or defining events in their relationship. Even when they moved on with other people Dimitri took Erica there when she was in a moment of distress and in need of comfort. It is sometimes referred to as their "port in the storm" because the lodge literally provided them shelter during a thunderstorm during the beginning of their storyline. In the wedding vows for their first marriage, Dimitri promised to be Erica's port in every thunderstorm. That also holds significant meaning since Erica has very negative reactions to thunderstorms after being raped during one when she was fourteen. During their wedding vows for their first union, this theme was referenced heavily:

When we met, I wasn't looking for love. I had lost once too often. I had resigned myself to my life. But someone knew better and that someone let it rain and rain and rain. And thanks to one glorious port in the storm, I looked into your eyes and I found love. We've had more than our share of trouble, but we've overcome and forgiven. Today we are marrying as a family. And our family will not look backward but forward. I vow to do everything in my power to make everyday of your life as dazzling as you are. I vow to be your port in every thunderstorm and your partner in all life to has to offer.

— Dimitri Marick, episode 6/22/93

== Reception and impact ==
Dimitri and Erica might not have been together in years, but time has not diminished their notoriety. To this day, the soap opera community and the entertainment industry at large note their romance. Soap Opera Digest listed their 1992 love story as one of All My Children's hottest summer plots, saying "the duo's passion for each other became too hot to ignore." Entertainment Weekly recognized the pair as one of soap opera's greatest supercouples along with sixteen others from various soap operas, including couples from both daytime and nighttime serials. The article cites the strength of Dimitri and Erica's love and how it helped them overcome even the highest of obstacles. When asked to name their favorite All My Children couple, the majority of viewers gave Dimitri and Erica that honor. In 2009, Soap Opera Digest listed the scenes where Erica shaved Dimitri's beard in 1992 as one of the forty most memorable romantic moments in soap operas.

Dimitri and Erica's romance is mentioned in various books. Other Worlds: Society Seen Through Soap Opera, Dorothy Anger's book on the study of soap opera's effects on society, sites Erica and Dimitri's notability among viewers and non-viewers, saying, "I know I can enter any house in my community, even that of perfect strangers, and mention Nikki and Victor, Erica and Dimitri, Lucky and Liz-someone, if not everyone, will know who I'm talking about."Real Things: An Anthology of Popular Culture in American Poetry by Jim Elledge is a collection of poetry about many different subjects in popular culture. One poem focus's on All My Children and features Dimitri and Erica during their affair while he was still married to Angelique. In a murder mystery novel, Murder Under Blue Skies by Willard Scott and Bill Crider, the couple and the frequent bumpiness of their relationship are mentioned. In So Faux, So Good, the fourth novel in the A Den of Antiquity Mystery series by Tamar Myers, Erica's pregnancy with Dimitri's baby is referenced, and in the first, Larceny and Old Lace, the detective and the investigator/narrator are both fans of AMC.

Mattel created two dolls based on Erica Kane as part of the company's Daytime Drama Collection. They released the first in 1998. After that doll met with success, they released the second in 1999 called the Champagne Lace Wedding Erica Kane Doll. this one was based on the character as she was during the character's 1993 wedding to Dimitri Marick. "Erica Kane truly has an amazing history with an equally amazing wardrobe!" Lucci said. "I am delighted to see another memorable moment of her life captured in this beautiful doll." In designing the doll, Mattel look the likeness of the actress and copied the details of the character's costume including the dress, the bouquet, and the Swarovski crystal wedding ring.

== See also ==
- List of supercouples
