= Dimitri Marick =

Fictional character from the American ABC soap opera All My Children

- All My Children character
- Michael Nader as Dimitri Marick
- Portrayed by: Michael Nader (1991–2001, 2013); Anthony Addabbo (2001)
- Duration: 1991–2001; 2013
- First appearance: September 1991
- Last appearance: September 2, 2013
- Created by: Agnes Nixon
- Introduced by: Jean Dadario Burke (1991); Ginger Smith (2013)
- Anthony Addabbo as Dimitri Marick
In-universe information
- Other names: Dimitri Yakov Marick (birth name); Dimi (nickname)
- Occupation: Head of Chandler Enterprises' media division, producer of the internet program Talk Tempo; Hungarian Royalty (Count Andrassy); Former Owner of WRCW; Multimillionaire Businessman and Investor; Member of the Board of Directors of Pine Valley Hospital
- Parents: Hugo Marick; Anna Sporades
- Half-brothers: Edmund Grey
- Spouse: Angelique Voynitzeva (1973–92); Erica Kane (1993–96); Gloria Marsh (1997–98); Alex Devane (1999–2013)
- Sons: Anton Lang
- Uncles: Alexei Von Voynavitch
- Nieces and nephews: Sam Grey (adoptive); Maddie Grey
- First cousins: Maxime Von Voynavitch
- Other relatives: Gillian Andrassy

Dimitri Marick is a fictional character from the American ABC soap opera All My Children. The role has been most notably portrayed by Michael Nader, previously famed for his role on Dynasty. Former head writers Agnes Nixon and Lorraine Broderick created the character in 1991, designing him as a brooding and mysterious character based on heroes from gothic literature, such as Maxim de Winter from Daphne du Maurier's novel Rebecca and Heathcliff from Emily Brontë's novel Wuthering Heights. The character's introduction raised All My Children in the Nielsen ratings, placing it consistently as the second most-watched daytime soap opera in the US.

Soon after his debut on the soap opera, Dimitri became a complex leading man and took part in some of the most notable plots of the 1990s. He had a very popular romance with Erica Kane (Susan Lucci). Dimitri and Erica's storylines include a tumultuous romance leading to two failed marriages and a miscarriage. One of the biggest obstacles in their relationship was Erica's vindinctive and manipulative daughter, Kendall Hart (Sarah Michelle Gellar). Dimitri also had a popular romance with Alexandra Devane (Finola Hughes) and a loving yet antagonistic relationship with his half-brother, Edmund Grey (John Callahan).

In July 1999, Nader was let go from All My Children due to budgetary considerations, however, he later returned in May 2000. The following year, the actor's arrest brought him and the character to the center of a large fan campaign organized by a group called the Loyalists, as well as a highly publicized lawsuit catching the attention of People and Entertainment Tonight, among other media outlets. As a result, Nader was let go again by the soap opera, with an official statement saying they would be prepared to consider having him return once he had addressed the lawsuit issues. The role was temporarily recast with actor Anthony Addabbo, who was negatively received by viewers, and let go shortly after his debut. Nader later stated in an interview that ABC had informed him that they had no intention of ever bringing him or the character back due to a lack of storyline. In 2004, Nader's suit was subsequently thrown out. In May 2013, after a twelve-year absence from All My Children, Nader was announced to be reprising the role, with his return airing on June 12, 2013.

== Casting ==
Casting the role of Dimitri gave All My Children difficulty. The series' casting director, Judy Blye Wilson, tested between fifteen and twenty actors, and could not find the right actor for the job. Wilson then learned that the former Dynasty star, Michael Nader was available and suggested the show offer him the part.

Before All My Children offered him the role of Dimitri Marick, Nader already planned on working in both Los Angeles and New York. "My fiancee, Beth Windsor, had literally just worked into being bicoastal," he said. "She had an apartment here and I had been seeking out some theater here in New York and would have been spending time both here and in L.A. So after we made the decision to go ahead with that game plan, this offer (Dimitri) came on the table and when we worked out all the figures moneywise it was a great opportunity." Despite Nader's prime time success as Dynasty's Dex Dexter, he did not look down on daytime television. "The fact of the matter is we're in a different era," he said. "And if you look at the cutbacks in Hollywood, being on a soap is not of any less or more value than being in any other medium at this time." Another factor that contributed to his decision to join All My Children was the actors strike. He intended to stay on All My Children for a year. That year turned into more because the actor fell in love with New York.

Since finding the right actor to play Dimitri took such a long time, the show had already begun taping around the character for two weeks. Nader spent his first weeks on All My Children working overtime to catch up. "By the time we had resolved some of the terms," he said, "they were really against the wall in terms of back story.... In retrospect, I should have just slept on the set because it was like sixty or seventy pages a day!" Nader also taped his scenes out of sequence while dealing with sixteen different scripts from different points in the story. To keep each scene straight he gave them each a name that described the scene's main action. After those scenes were taped, they were spliced into the otherwise completed episodes. This went on for two weeks until the episodes were all caught up. Another complication Nader dealt with was the wardrobe. He said, "They had devised this sort of 'tapestry' layered look for Dimitri and it was like doing scenes inside a sauna." This was eventually rectified, but not before the actor lost around twelve pounds in the two weeks.

Michael Nader was fired from All My Children in July 1999, due to budget considerations, and Dimitri was killed off. This led to a fan outcry from viewers who campaigned for the actor's return. To partially appease them, the show's executive producer, Jean Dadario Burke, offered Nader his job back on a recurring basis. He rejected this offer because "after being a major character for so long, it didn't make any sense to me. So I declined. But if the network was interested in seriously discussing Dimitri's return on a contract basis I would love to go back."

In May 2000, he was rehired and brought back into the role with a multi-year contract. The return story scripted for the Dimitri character centered on the romance between his brother Edmund and his wife Alex. Dimitri was revealed to be alive just as his wife, Alex, and brother, Edmund, had sex for the first time. Nader said he wanted to create a deeper layer in the character instead of focusing solely on the love triangle between Dimitri, Alex, and Edmund. "I do hope to pursue some sort of subtle spiritual change, some perception that Dimitri is different," he said. He questioned the writers' storyline choice in not exploring the popular Dimitri and Erica romance again. "I found it sort of odd that they'd move me so far away from Susan[Lucci, Erica]," Nader said. "They're trying to explore these other themes."

Nader lost the role again in February 2001 as a result of the actor getting arrested for allegedly selling cocaine to an undercover police officer. All My Children released an official statement saying, "If Mr. Nader gets the help that he needs and addresses his problem, and it makes sense for the show, we would be prepared to speak with Michael in the future." The network put Nader on probation and ordered him to seek help for his problem.

Anthony Addabbo temporarily took over the role, first airing on April 6, 2001. To prepare for the role, he watched tapes of Nader's portrayal of Dimitri in order to see the relationships between Dimitri and other characters. Despite the fan protest against the role being recast, Addabbo told Soap Opera Digest he was not worried. "I don't find it intimidating," he said. "I know how they can come to love a certain actor portraying a role and how he plays the role and everything, but this happens in daytime so frequently that I didn't find it intimidating at all." Soap Opera Digest considered him an odd choice for a Dimitri recast since Addabbo usually portrayed "all-American good guys" such as Generations Jason Craig and Guiding Light's Jim LeMay. A large number of All My Children fans rejected Addabbo in the role and continued to campaign for Nader's return. The controversy forced the writers to lessen Dimitri's role on the show until July 2001 when Addabbo was let go "for storyline reasons", according to ABC's official statement.

During an interview, Nader told Soap Opera Digest that in late September 2001, ABC called a meeting with him to inform him that, though he resolved his personal problems, they had no intention of ever bringing him or the character back due to lack of story. Nader argued that other storyline possibilities existed since he and Dimitri received "a tremendous response" from viewers. "For years, Dimitri and Erica were a popular coupling," he said. "A good friend of mine, Jack Scalia (Chris), is on...that alone would be a dynamic triangle."

In May 2013, following a twelve-year absence from All My Children, Nader was announced to be reprising the role of Dimitri, scheduled to begin in June. Initially his first airdate was 3 June, however, due to Prospect Park's decision to reduce the number of episodes made available each week, he did not air until 12 June.

== Development ==
Former head writers Agnes Nixon and Lorraine Broderick created the character Dimitri Marick in 1991. His original purpose was to rescue Natalie Marlowe from the well her sister, Janet Green, trapped her in. He was also designed as a rival for Natalie's current love interest, Trevor Dillon. Trevor and Natalie were a popular couple at that point and the writers wanted to create a viable obstacle for them. Really exciting, romantic, handsome leading man, so that there would be a real impediment; you know we'd have a really exciting love story between Trevor and somebody as different from Trevor as we could get...because Trevor is a wonderful, warm, teddy bear, lovable, down-to-earth, right-out-there guy- and Dimitri is very much opposite from that." Broderick characterized the character in an interview with Soap Opera Update, stating:

He's certainly a man who wants to be in control. He's a very strong man, he's a very passionate man. He's had a troubled, tragic background, and is just beginning to come out into the world again after being quite reclusive for the past fifteen years. He is guarded, and he plays everything close to the vest. He is very slow to let other people in- except Natalie, with whom he feels a special and unique bond, because he rescued her and because he fell in love with her very quickly, which we hope will be part of the mystery.

Nixon and Broderick also crafted the character as a darkly brooding and mysterious man in the same vein as gothic literary heroes such as Heathcliff from Wuthering Heights, Edward Rochester from Jane Eyre, and Maxim de Winter from Rebecca. Nixon used these characters as inspiration for Dimitri because, as she told Soap Opera Weekly, "In doing the 'stolen life' story, I felt that we needed something to follow that was also a little larger than life, very romantic, and gothic." The characters played a part in shaping Dimitri as well as his environment and storylines. Maxim de Winter's estate, Manderley, provided the inspiration for Dimitri's Pine Valley estate, Wildwind. The design was taken from both the description in Du Maurier's book and the depiction from the film Rebecca, a 1940 adaptation of the novel by Alfred Hitchcock. Like Mr. Rochester, the wife Dimitri falsely claims died years ago is revealed to be alive just before his marriage to another woman.

Nixon infused elements of those literatures into the Dimitri and Natalie romance with as well. "There's a gothic quality to it", she said, referring to the couple. "It's Wuthering Heights or Jane Eyre. Everybody loves somebody who has a past and a secret- and certainly Dimitri does- which we haven't divulged yet. That heightens ones interest and suspense. It's a special situation but what really makes it special is the actor's talent, personalities, good looks, and chemistry." Since the writers created Dimitri as a very mysterious character, Michael Nader mostly stayed away from the press in order to help maintain that image. Whenever he did do an interview, he discussed the character in such a way as to add more mystery. Nader compared Dimitri to the Dynasty character he once portrayed, Dex Dexter. On Dynasty, "John James (Jeff Colby) played the 'aw, shucks;' nice guy, and I played the guy who was on the edge, who would take care of business and not take any bull", he said. "Dimitri is sort of a darker Dex. Though I don't know exactly how dark to make him yet." Nader, as an actor, also provided the writers with more inspiration on the character. "The more we see of him, the more he inspires us", Broderick said. "It's just a wonderful marriage of actor and character[...] He's giving us so many levels and such depth, that it's a challenge. But it's exciting. Dimitri is one of the characters that is so much fun to write."

== Storylines ==
=== Backstory ===
To further the mystery element and add an international twist to the story, Nixon scripted Dimitri as having close European roots, though he is an American. He is the son of Hungarian parents, Hugo and Anna. Originally, his wealth comes from all the land around Pine Valley and the One Life to Live city Llanview, which he inherits from his parents. That is also where his fictional estate, Wildwind, is located. Later, during Dimitri's 1992 story with Erica Kane, he is revealed to also be Hungarian nobility as Count Andrassy. He inherited his title and his Hungarian castle, Vadzel, from his father's side. Both of his parents were dead by the time Dimitri first appears on All My Children. He spends his childhood years growing up in Europe and on the Wildwind estate. He has a complicated relationship with Edmund Gresham, the son of two of his family's employees, unknown to Dimitri to be his half-brother. His childhood sweetheart was Angelique Voynitzeva, the daughter of his nanny, Helga. Helga later becomes his housekeeper. Fifteen years prior to Dimitri's appearance on-screen, he and Angelique married. Angelique becomes pregnant but suffers a miscarriage which devastates both of them. Angelique has a riding accident which leaves her in a coma. Dimitri tries to find a cure, but is unable to and sends her to a clinic in Austria. He becomes reclusive for the next decade because of the guilt he feels over her condition. Finding Natalie in 1991 brings him out into society again.

=== 1991–2001 ===
Dimitri Marick first appears in Pine Valley in 1991 when he rescues Natalie Marlowe from the well her sister, Janet Green, trapped her in on the Wildwind estate. She resembles his comatose wife, Angelique, which attracts him to her. While he nurses her back to health, Dimitri becomes obsessively in love with her. His housekeeper, Helga, who is also Angelique's mother, is not pleased about this. He lies to Natalie that his wife died years ago. Once Natalie recovers and everyone learns what happened to her at Janet's hand, Natalie's fiancé, Trevor Dillon, tries to reconcile with her. Natalie rejects her fiancé, Trevor Dillon, because Janet fooled him into thinking she was Natalie and he slept with her. Dimitri and Natalie become engaged. Unbeknown to Dimitri, Angelique has awoken from her coma and Helga brings her to Dimitri and Natalie's engagement party. Natalie leaves Dimitri and reunites with Trevor. Dimitri reconciles with his wife.

Dimitri begins an affair with Erica Kane. He falls in love with her, but feels he must stay with Angelique. Edmund Grey, the son of a Marick family maid and gardener, returns to town to see Angelique, his close childhood friend. Dimitri is furious to see Edmund again since he had stolen money from Dimitri's father to pay for his education. Dimitri is stunned when Edmund informs him that they are half-brothers. Edmund had discovered this when he found Hugo Marick's will that states he is not only his illegitimate son, but that he is the lawful heir to Wildwind. Helga had planted the will as revenge for Dimitri's affair with Erica, but when Dimitri assures Helga he is now completely devoted to Angelique, she destroys the will in order to keep the estate for her daughter. Edmund files a lawsuit to have Hugo's body exhumed, which causes the hatred between him and Dimitri to deepen even more. Eventually, the truth about what Helga did is revealed and she dies. Dimitri and Edmund agree to put the past behind them and they bond as brothers. They develop an extremely close and loving relationship, but they also continue to have a standing rivalry.

Dimitri ends his marriage to Angelique and marries Erica. The newlyweds settle into Wildwind and Dimitri develops a close relationship with Erica's daughter, Bianca Montgomery. Dimitri's happiness with Erica is disrupted by Erica's vengeful older daughter, Kendall Hart. Kendall tells Dimitri she is in love with him, but he immediately rejects her. As revenge, Kendall implies to Erica that Dimitri sexually assaulted her and Erica, who was raped by Kendall's father Richard Fields, stabs Dimitri in the neck. Erica is charged with attempted murder, but is acquitted.

Another bombshell is dropped in Dimitri's life when he finds out that Anton Lang, who he believed to be brother of his maid Corvina (Margaret Sophie Stein), is actually his son with Corvina. Dimitri had had a drunken one-night stand with Corvina which he had no memory of. Dimitri is happy to finally be a father and attempts to forge relationship with Anton without telling him about his parentage. When the truth finally comes out, Anton is devastated and wants nothing to do with Dimitri. Anton later marries Kendall to throw it in Dimitri's face. Eventually, Anton sees Kendall for the manipulator that she is and divorces her. Anton and Dimitri make peace with each other before Anton leaves town.

During a time when they are both particularly vulnerable, Dimitri and Edmund's wife, Maria, sleep together. When Maria finds out she is pregnant, the baby's paternity is in question. They have a DNA test done and Skye Chandler, who is in love with Edmund, tampers with test so it will show Dimitri is the father when it is in fact Edmund. After Maria confesses everything, a devastated Edmund tells Dimitri that he is dead to him and he will be bringing the child up as his own. Erica also finds out she is pregnant around this time, but miscarries. Maria gives birth to a baby girl with Erica's help. Maria's daughter is presumed dead after a car accident, but she has actually been kidnapped by Erica and named Sonya. Erica eventually returns the baby to Maria and she is renamed Maddie. Maria is later presumed dead in a plane crash. Dimitri discovers that Edmund is Maddie's father when he finds out their blood types do not match. He takes her to Vadzel, but Edmund tracks them down and takes back custody of Maddie. The brothers remain estranged for quite some time, but eventually manage to reconcile. Dimitri leaves Pine Valley permanently in 2001 with his current wife, Alex Devane.

=== 2013 ===
In June 2013, Dimitri received an email from his old friend and former lover Brooke English. Brooke was shocked when Dimitri responded by showing up at her door, and told him that she thought she'd never see him again. Dimitri revealed that he and Alex had divorced, and that he had not bothered remaining in touch with his family and had reverted to his reclusive ways, but that Europe was beginning to bore him and her timing couldn't have been better. Upon returning to town, he stopped by his former residence, Wildwind, only to find that the place was empty. Brooke explained that after its last occupant, Caleb Cortlandt, had moved out, Sam and Maddie, Edmund's children, had not bothered to rent the mansion out again. Dimitri told Brooke that, while at Wildwind, he stopped by the mausoleum and made amends to Edmund, who had died in a fire 8 years earlier.

Brooke explained to Dimitri that she needed someone to oversee the online division of Chandler Media, and she felt Dimitri would be perfect for the job. Dimitri eagerly accepted. Later, Brooke re-introduced Dimitri to J.R. Chandler, who, although appeared happy to see Dimitri, was nonetheless jealous of the fact that Dimitri, and not him, would be overseeing Chandler Media.

As Dimitri and Brooke worked more and more closely together, Dimitri developed feelings for her, which came to a head when he kissed her shortly after the Chandler Media Gala. Brooke told Dimitri that can never happen again, because she is engaged to marry Adam.

== Post Cancellation ==
During a March 2019 episode of General Hospital the character Robert Scorpio tells Anna Devane that he has been in touch with Dimitri related to an investigation into ex-wife Alex's activities, and that Dimitri has handed over records relating to Alex for Anna to review.

In February 2021, Dimitri (with only his hands being seen) mails a letter containing Alex's last will and testament, as well as a USB thumb drive to Peter August (Wes Ramsey). This led to rumors that Dimitri might be making an appearance on General Hospital. However, Michael Nader's death later that same year prevented this from occurring.

== Reception ==
Dimitri became a popular leading man soon after his debut on All My Children in 1991 and "was prominent in some of the show's most memorable tales of that decade." The character and his portrayer, Michael Nader, were credited with lifting the Nielsen ratings as well as saving the Natalie, Trevor, and Janet storyline. In that storyline, the character Janet Green imprisons her sister Natalie in a well and masquerades as Natalie to seduce her fiancé Trevor. Fans and soap opera press criticized the story. In Soap Opera Weekly, Marlena De Lacroix said, "Dimitri was the saving grace of the storyline I'd earlier called an artistic disaster: the Janet and Natalie body switch." She described Dimitri as a "cross between Rudolph Valentino's Sheik and the gothic Maxim de Winter from Rebecca." Viewers found the character "irresistible"; so much so that Soap Opera Digest questioned whether the character was a diversion from the failed storyline. All My Children's head writer Agnes Nixon denied this. "We expected to get negative mail on Janet/Nat," she said, "they [the viewers] don't like it but they [keep] watching."

The character gained further success with the popular Dimitri and Erica pairing. In 1993, viewers named them a supercouple, along with One Life to Live's Bo and Nora and Days of our Lives' Roman and Marlena. In 2008, Entertainment Weekly listed them among the top seventeen supercouples. Soap Opera Digest compared them to the real life couple Elizabeth Taylor and Richard Burton because of their tumultuous nature.

The romance between Dimitri and Finola Hughes' Alexandra Devane Marick also rose in popularity. Soap Opera Update named them the best couple of the year in 1999 for All My Children despite the fact that their love story played out through brief flashbacks. The magazine compared the couple's relationship to the television series Once and Again. Soap Opera Update also referred to them as the "break out supercouple of the year".

The Dimitri character took a darker turn in 1997, in what Soap Opera Digest considered an effort to make Erica more sympathetic after her role in the kidnapping of the baby Maddie Grey (then known as Sonya). Soap Opera Digest praised the move in an article naming Nader Performer of the Week, saying, "Nader has been surprisingly effective as a meanie, and nothing short of brilliant taking an already complex character and making him more compelling." Soap Opera Weekly's Gabrielle Winkel expressed similar sentiments, saying, "Michael Nader is far more entertaining and compelling now that Dimitri is out for himself than when he was as Erica's devoted husband...AMC was right on target when it developed Dimitri's dark side. Nader's brooding looks and raspy voice have always given Dimitri that evil edge. Nader, though, wisely keeps Dimitri's obsessiveness sufficiently in check to make it believable." At the conclusion of the storyline Soap Opera Digest again named him Performer of the Week for "unleashing the sort of go-for-broke fury and fray that actors are usually reluctant to release unless they're certain their character is about to be killed off."

Soap Opera Digest noted the rarity of brothers like Edmund Grey and Dimitri Marick. In the soap opera genre, brothers with a standing rivalry as well as a strong fraternal bond are considered to be a rarity. Sisters on soap operas were usually the ones who shared "men, makeup, and misery." Dimitri and Edmund's relationship was scripted as complicated, transitioning between loving and antagonistic. Their relationship gained positive feedback from both viewers and the soap opera media. Soap Opera Digest named them Best Brothers of 1994, saying, "In Michael Nader (Dimitri) and John Callahan (Edmund), AMC has charismatic performers with chemistry, and they're making the most of it." Complications in the brothers' relationship included childhood jealousies, the revelation that they were brothers, Dimitri's one-night stand with Edmund's wife Maria and subsequent question of the paternity of Maddie Grey, and the Dimitri, Alex, and Edmund triangle. Along with the conflict, they displayed a loving relationship where they stood by each other. In describing the relationship, Nader said, "The storyline with Edmund and Dimitri, the Marick brothers, there wasn't a brother duo on television that had the sort of power that John and I could bring to that relationship."

Storylines they featured in met with both praise and negative reactions. With the plot centering on Maddie Grey's paternity and kidnappings, All My Children "fans revolted en masse." Yet Soap Opera Digest hailed the plot as "one of the best told, most fascinating storylines of the year." In the Dimitri, Alex, and Edmund triangle, viewers took two opposing views on which brother should end up with Alex. Soap Opera Weekly proclaimed the triangle a hit, while Soap Opera Update rated it a ten out of ten. In the storyline, Alex and Edmund fall in love while her husband Dimitri is presumed dead. They eventually become engaged. When he returns and witnesses their happy relationship, Dimitri decides not to interfere. "The dilemma for Dimitri is his brother's happiness," Nader said. "As much as he loves Alex, he's made the choice to give her to Edmund." Alex discovers Dimitri alive first. They reunite and engage in sex. Edmund finds out and feels betrayed by them both. The scenes of the confrontation between all three characters was written to express the views of both the Dimitri and Alex and the Edmund and Alex fans. The viewers who rooted for Edmund argued that Dimitri and Alex betrayed him by having sex immediately after reuniting. Viewers who supported Dimitri argued that the reunion was not a betrayal since Dimitri was Alex's husband. Alex ends up with Dimitri, which changes "Edmund from a jaded, one-note character into a far more multidimensional and intriguing hero." Soap Opera Weekly praised All My Children for not dragging the triangle out and instead using it as a catalyst for character development.

Charlie Mason from Soaps She Knows put Addabbo's portrayal of the character on his list of the worst soap opera temporary recasts, commenting that "Addabbo lacked the air of Old World regality that Nader exuded, fans balked, and the recast was sent packing before he'd even had time to finish nibbling his Welcome to All My Children gift basket."

== Controversy ==
In what Soap Opera Digest named the year's Dumbest Male Axing in 1999, Nader was fired from the role of Dimitri and the character was killed off. The firing "set off a firestorm of protest from devoted fans." Those fans came together to form a group called the Loyalists and campaigned for the actor's return. They "bombarded" All My Children with letters centering on three major complaints concerning Nader's dismissal, as summarized in Soap Opera Digest: "1) They have waited two years for a Dimitri/Erica reunion, which they won't get now that he's leaving. 2) They adore Nader's chemistry with on-screen brother John Callahan (Edmund) and don't want to lose it. 3) They fear that Nader has been sacrificed to make room in the budget for new- and younger- cast members." In response to the last complaint, an All My Children spokesperson pointed out the storylines planned for characters over thirty years old such as Tad, Dixie, Erica, David, Edmund, and Alex.

Nader thanked the Loyalists for their support and expressed his surprise at the size of the response. "[T]he expanse and impact were quite astounding to me," he said. "In my years of doing this, I never experienced this kind of support." Susan Lucci commented on the fan response, saying, "So many people stop me on the street and ask me, 'Will Dimitri ever come back and will he and Erica ever get together.'"

At a fan luncheon, the Loyalists confronted All My Children's executive producer Jean Dadario Burke with a petition asking for Nader's return. They also organized a tune-out of the show on November 5, 1999. To appease them at least in part, Burke offered Nader his job back on a recurring basis, which he refused. In 2000, All My Children rehired him on a contract basis. His co-star, Hughes was happy about the news, saying his return would "give a huge injection of 'fuel'" to the Alex and Edmund romance.

In 2001, Nader was arrested for cocaine possession. All My Children suspended him and demanded he get treatment. They cast Addabbo in the role as a temporary replacement. Fans of Nader, the Loyalists in particular, rejected the recast. Though the majority of the viewers did not take to him, Addabbo gained an amount of support from fans who wanted him to continue in the role or portray a different character once Nader returned. Soap Opera Digest criticized the casting of Addabbo because the actor usually portrayed "all-American good guys", the opposite of the Dimitri Marick role. In July of that year, Addabbo was let go and Dimitri was officially written out.

After Nader got help for his drug addiction at Hazelton Clinic in Minnesota, All My Children opted not to bring him back. Nader filed a $31.7 million lawsuit against ABC for breach of contract under the Americans with Disabilities Act. ABC's lawyers cited Nader's violation of the morals clause in his contract as justification for not rehiring him. The firing and lawsuit caught the attention of non-soap opera medias such as TV Guide, Inside Edition, People, Celebrity Justice, Extra, Entertainment Tonight, and Larry King Live. Manhattan Federal Judge Jed S. Rakoff threw out the suit in 2004.

== See also ==
- Dimitri Marick and Erica Kane
