= Peter August =

- General Hospital character
- Portrayed by: Wes Ramsey
- Duration: 2017–2022, 2026
- First appearance: November 14, 2017
- Last appearance: September 9, 2026
- Created by: Shelly Altman and Chris Van Etten
- Introduced by: Frank Valentini
In-universe information
- Other names: Henrik Faison; Henri Francois; P.K. Sinclair (pen name); Isaac Refson; Roger Browne; Anthony Brady; Peter Sinclair
- Occupation: COO of Aurora Media
- Parents: Cesar Faison; Alex Marick
- Half-brothers: Nathan West
- Half-sisters: Britt Westbourne
- Daughters: Louise Jones
- Grandparents: Emil Krieg; Sybil McTavish; Thomas Devane
- Aunts and uncles: Anna Devane; Lindsay Devane; Gabriel Devane
- Nephews: James West
- First cousins: Robin Scorpio; Leora Hayward; Aidan Devane

Peter August is a fictional character from General Hospital, an American soap opera on the ABC network, portrayed by Wes Ramsey. Peter is introduced as a media publisher in 2017, and is soon revealed to be the previously unknown son of Cesar Faison (Anders Hove) and Alex Marick (Finola Hughes). However, he was believed to be the son of Anna Devane (also Hughes), Alex's twin sister.

Peter’s introduction garnered very mixed reactions from both critics and viewers alike. While most felt the story undermined Anna's long history and backstory, a few, including ABC Soaps In Depth actually liked the umbrella affect the story had on the canvas. Despite the critiques about Peter being Anna's son, many praised Ramsey for his "compelling" and "nuanced" portrayal of the character. TV Insider hailed the revelation of Peter's lineage as one of the "Best Moments" of the year, while Michael Fairman TV said Peter was the "Most Polarizing Character" of the season and Soap Opera Digest felt it was too big a "rewrite" for fans to believe.

== Development ==
Ramsey on creating Peter

So all of my work was watching Finola [Hughes] and Anders [Hove] playing Anna and Cesar Faison on YouTube clips – and there are hundreds of ’em out there! So I’m going back and watching these characters on the show in the 80’s and in the 90’s; watching the way they move and listening to the way they talk. Obviously, none of the stuff about the characters of Anna and Peter was revealed to me then, only that I was the son of Faison. The fact that it became Anna as well later, I felt it was fantastic that I’d already been watching so much of her as well. And watching his obsession with her and watching the way they performed and acted together over the years. I felt like a lot of the groundwork I needed for my scenes with her had already happened in preparing to work with Anders and being Cesar Faison’s son.

— Wes Ramsey, Behind the Lens Online (2018)

=== Casting and creation ===
In October 2017, TVLine announced that Wes Ramsey, previously recognized for his portrayal of Sam Spencer on Guiding Light, had been cast in the "mystery role" of Peter August. Besides his first air-date, no further details were made available at press time. Ramsey, who had recently become known to General Hospital fans as the boyfriend of Laura Wright – who plays Carly Corinthos – took to social media about his casting: "Port Charles is a dream come true!" Ramsey accompanied Wright to set one day and had a friendly encounter with executive producer Frank Valentini. A few months later, Ramsey came in to audition for the role of Peter. In 2009, Ramsey auditioned at One Life to Live where Valentini also served as executive producer. Ramsey felt he and Valentini had "unfinished business" after their first meeting in 2009. With his most recent stint in daytime being a short lived role at Days of Our Lives, Ramsey turned to daytime once again because he missed the genre. "To tell you the truth, I felt better about this time and this role and this show than any other time in my career." Wright helped him prepare for the screen test. Ramsey competed against 8 other actors, and auditioned 3 times for the role. The actors, including Ramsey, auditioned with opposite Finola Hughes who plays Peter's mother, Anna.

Hughes concluded that Henrik/Peter's creation was a surefire way to, in the words of ABC Soaps In Depth, "blow up" the canvas for so many characters. In an interview with Soap Opera Digest, Ramsey explained that Peter was presented to him as a "much smaller role and throughout the course of a few weeks, grew into something else." Despite their hesitation, both Hughes and her co-star Tristan Rogers — who plays Anna's ex-husband Robert — agreed that the story of Peter's conception and birth would fit into the timeline without completely upending the history between their own characters.

In June 2021, Ramsey exited the role. Following a two month absence, Ramsey returned to the role during the final moments of the August 23 episode. On February 23, 2022, he exited the role once again. In 2026, Ramsey made an unannounced guest return during the January 23 episode. Six months later, he returned with ongoing appearances. Scenes concerning Ramsey's exit in the role aired on September 9, 2026.

=== Characterization ===
==== Personality ====
Ramsey characterized Peter August to be a "genuinely good guy" as originally presented to the audience. But, Ramsey insisted, "He's no pushover!" Peter is "complicated, confusing and disturbing" the actor stated. Ramsey said that Peter "obviously believes he's capable of outwitting anyone." Ramsey's favorite thing about Peter is "his complexity." Peter "thinks he's invincible" Ramsey later said. As far as Peter is concerned, "there isn't a situation he could find himself in that he can't handle." Underestimating those around him is "hubris." Peter has consistently been described as a "puppeteer" or "puppetmaster." Ramsey further described Peter as a "master communicator and manipulator." Despite his apparent arrogance, Peter can also show "vulnerability," "sadness and weakness" when he has to.

ABC Soaps In Depth has described the character as "debonair" "mysterious" and "rather cocky." The magazine described Peter as an "educated, well-mannered, worldly guy." However, he is a "recovering villain." Hope Campbell of Soap Hub described Peter as the "mild-mannered infamous traitor." She continued, "he seems a little humdrum… kinda like Nathan." Janet Di Lauro of said Peter looks like a "stiff, buttoned-up executive" at first glance. While he can be "devious" like Faison, he's "not as deadly." Caralynn Lippo of TV Fanatic described Peter as "menacing-yet-conflicted." Donald Thompson said Henrik/Peter is "like a chameleon." Anders Hove described Peter as a "brilliant, good-looking young man who's been let down — and has certain genes from his father that are not worth bragging about." Shabnaj Chowdhury saw Peter "as a man haunted by his upbringing and desperate for redemption."

==== Backstory ====
Peter, whose birth name is Henrik Faison, is the oldest son of Cesar Faison. According to Liesl Obrecht, Henrik idolizes his father but Faison doesn't show him any affection because of who his mother is, or isn't. Faison ships Henrik off to boarding school when he is old enough. In Peter's own words, Faison "rejected and hated" him. All Henrik knows of his mother growing up is that she abandoned him as an infant, and Henrik is delivered to Faison through a third party so not even Faison can determine which of his many lovers had given birth to his son. Henrik fantasizes about his mother coming to rescue him one day but Faison warns that it will never happen. Henrik finds relief that Faison usually ignores him to focus on business. Henrik attends several boarding schools in Europe, including one very prestigious school in Bern, Switzerland under the alias, Henri Francois. As a child, Henrik finds a friend and mentor in Valentin Cassadine, one of Faison's business associates. Valentin even attends one of Henrik's school plays after Faison refuses. After boarding school, Henrik comes to America to attend Harvard University. Henrik seemingly changes his name to Peter August just before his 21st birthday. As Peter, he attends graduate school at the Yale University's School of Management. After graduation, Peter finds work at several companies in Europe, including Modesto Media in Milan, Italy. However, he does not have much time for romantic relationships because he moves around too much. Peter successfully runs a publishing company for a couple of years in Europe before his arrival in Port Charles.

Henrik was born on June 13, 1976, with the help of midwife Mireille Lambert in a house located at 27 Rue De Louvain in Brussels, Belgium. Alex Marick seduces a drunken Faison to steal information from him. It was easy, as Faison had been paying prostitutes to impersonate Anna. Soon after, Alex suddenly leaves school for "special training" but in actuality, she was pregnant. Alex refuses to even look at her child and begs the midwife place the baby with a loving family. However, Valentin having followed Alex, tracks down Hernik's adoptive family, and threatens them into relinquishing the child whom he then turns over to Faison.

Peter craves "love and acceptance" but that desperation only makes life more difficult. With Faison as a father, "all he got was pain, abuse, manipulation and abandonment. He developed scars" Ramsey said. In 2019, Ramsey said the "trauma of being Faison's son" holds Peter back from having "a real life — real connections and real friendships and a real relationship" for most of his life. He grows up trying to "outrun" Faison's shadow. Before Anna, Peter does not have that "female energy to confide in or a mom to go and seek counsel from."

=== Introduction and identity (2017–2018) ===
Peter debut occurs during Sweeps in November 2017. On Peter's arrival, Ramsey described it as "very cloak-and-dagger and very manipulative." He also said Peter is "tugging on string and using words and intentions to make people dance the way he wants them to." For the first two months, Ramsey was "simply in the dark" about Peter's backstory. "Sometimes ignorance is bliss" Ramsey said. In December 2017, Ramsey met with Frank Valentini and script writer Elizabeth Korte to fill in the blanks about Peter. "It was a slow reveal but the moment I really needed what I needed, they gave it to me full force and I was able to run with it." In January 2018, Peter is revealed to be the traitorous son of Cesar Faison, born to Faison's arch nemesis, super spy Anna Devane. Ramsey described the plot twist as "overwhelming in a wonderful way" and he was "flattered" that the producers trusted him with such a pivotal role. Ramsey, who grew up watching Anna, was very excited about working with the Hughes. "I have a great scene partner in Wes" Hughes said of Ramsey.ABC Soaps In Depth said "Perhaps the most tragic part of Peter’s tale is that the mother he hates for abandoning him only wants to find him, explain herself and take him into her arms." Ramsey said "an incredible and complicated backstory has been gifted to me." Shelly Altman explained that Peter and Anna are on a "collision course" because Peter resents the mother he never knew for abandoning him.

Peter takes center stage as Anna, Robert Scorpio, and Nina Cassadine are all prying into his past for different reasons. At the same time, Peter's confidant Valentin is on edge as he fears Peter's exposure. Meanwhile, mobster Jason Morgan and investigative journalist Lulu are also looking for Henrik. Peter is "at odds with some very powerful people, and they're getting close, but he's not fearful in anyway." Wes Ramsey was particularly excited about the potentially explosive reveal. "Things are about to get crazy" he declared. The revelation that Peter is Henrik "feels like a time bomb that's hardwired to branch out and devastate so many lives in so many different ways. When it goes off, it's going to spread like wildfire." Postponing the climax of the story "only has created more tension. Now, we're all horses at the gate, ready to run. We want the race to start!"

The storyline was set to climax during May Sweeps during the Nurses' Ball. By this time, more than half of the characters on canvas was invested in the plot in one way or another. It is not until Peter discovers that Anna has seemingly set a trap for him by "posing" as his mother that he views her as a real threat. Peter is insulted by the idea that Anna would use something so personal against him. "It is something that is he not going to let pass." Peter and Anna's first interactions before the reveal were "foreshadowing" of their eventual relationship. They "have an intellectual standoff, using their wits, minds and language to face off. Neither would back down, and that was powerful…" In their standoff, Peter is forced to confront the "anger and animosity" that he harbors for Anna.

=== Redemption (2018–2019) ===
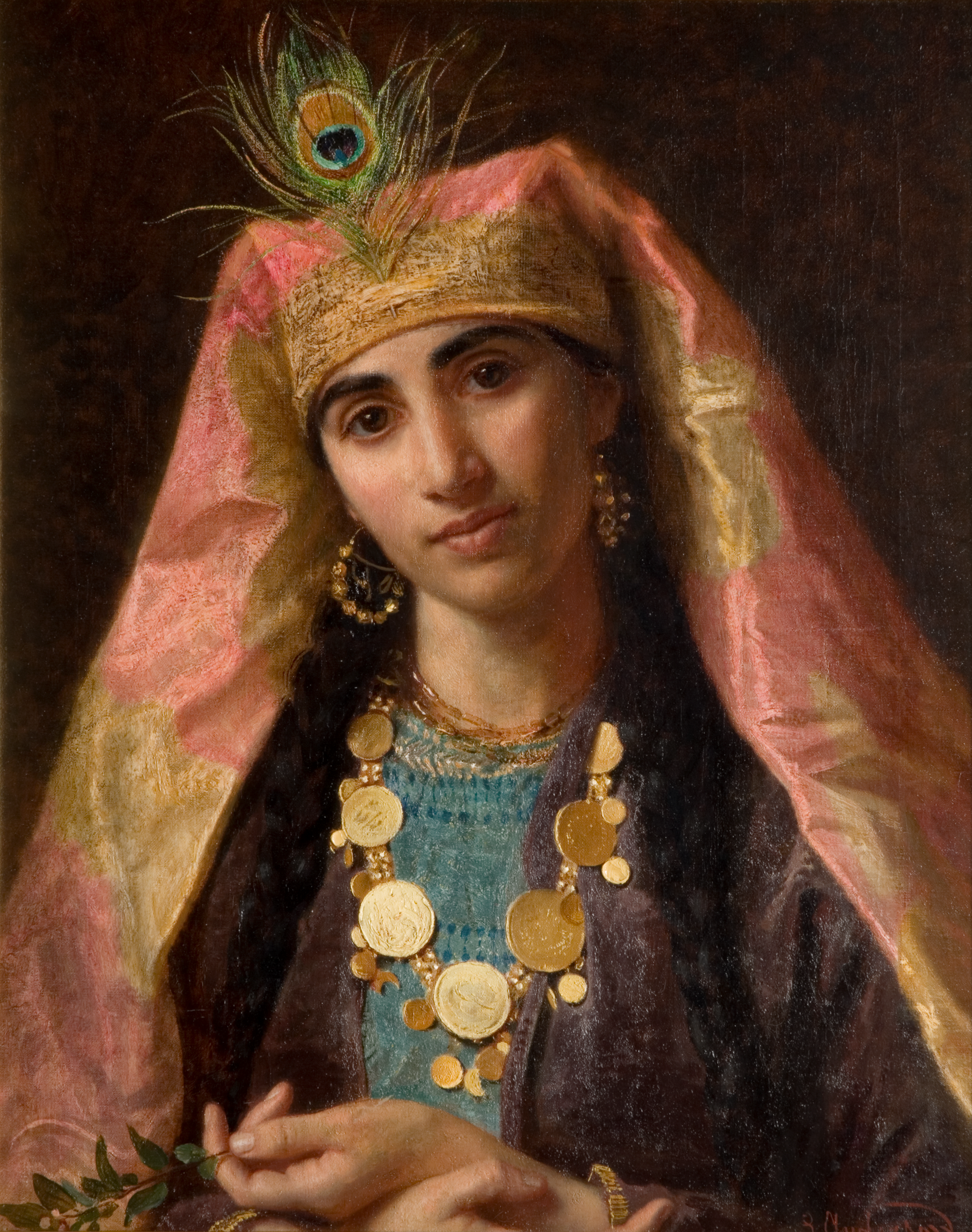
During his captivity, head writer Shelly Altman likened Peter to Scheherazade in the Middle Eastern literature One Thousand and One Nights.

In the summer of 2018, Peter undergoes the painstaking process of redemption which starts with delivering Maxie's baby under "dramatic" circumstances. Wes Ramsey described it as a "right of passage, to deliver a baby on the side of the road." Ramsey admitted that he did his best to support Kirsten Storms during the scenes because "as much was on my shoulders, there was even more on hers." While playing out the drama, the actors tried to find moments to insert a "light touch of humor" while also maintaining the realism.

Peter is simultaneously in both "the right place at the right time" for Maxie, or "the wrong place at the wrong time" because of what happens next. After he gets himself released from police custody Peter is abducted by Nathan's grief stricken mother, Liesl Obrecht. When Obrecht tricks Nina into helping her, Peter fears the worst. "He is quite sure that the endgame wasn't simply kidnapping him." Though Nina does want Peter to pay for his crimes, Nina has a big heart which Peter has to appeal to in order to garner sympathy. While Obrecht claims she only wants a confession, Peter quickly realizes she wants him dead. He must distract her with stories about his life in an effort to save himself. "If when his story is finished she intends to kill him, then Peter has to keep this story going for as long as possible!" He is even willing to give up the little bit of leverage he still has by telling Nina how Drew Cain can get his memories back. That's Peter's way of proving that he's not a "monster" and it works, at least for Nina. While Nina keeps Obrecht from going too far, she is too "torn" by her grief to simply help Peter escape. Despite his best efforts, Peter is terrified that he will die. But even when Obrecht is at her most cruel, Peter isn't easily defeated. According to Ramsey, "Peter's pulling on that same spirit and strength that allowed him to beat his father and survive all those years to become the man he is." When Peter convinces a young boy scout named Wyatt (Patrick Gibbons, Jr.) to free him, he uses that as motivation to convince Nina to let him go before someone else does. Obrecht nearly kills Peter, along with herself and Nina when she moves him to avoid being caught and they get caught in a fire. Fortunately he is rescued by Hamilton Finn. During Peter's "cruel" imprisonment and torture, Ramsey is able to "step away" from who Peter is on the surface, and explore the character. "It was certainly humbling to find the complete other side of the spectrum and show Peter’s vulnerability when he was facing his own mortality and his own remorse!" Ramsey said "Peter's certain paid a price for his actions" on the road to his redemption. However, Peter still must get out from under the WSB and earn Maxie's forgiveness but the actor insisted that "he'll figure something out!" When asked if Peter would cause more "havoc" on the canvas, Frank Valentini only said "there is a lot of story there" because of Peter's connections to those on and off canvas, including Anna and Maxie. In the aftermath of his ordeal with Obrecht, Ramsey insisted that Peter had paid sufficiently for his actions. "It was a bit of moral payback" Ramsey said. Peter goes from playing everyone around him to facing his "mortality and remorse." The actor said it was "humbling" experience to play the opposite of what Peter had previously presented himself to be. In addition to making amends to those he's wronged, part of Peter's redemption includes slowly building a relationship with Anna. While they start to thaw toward one another in time for the Christmas, "They're not like besties or anything" Finola Hughes said in early 2019. "They've begun this kind of dance" Hughes said of their evolving dynamic. It's like, "I won't be so prickly with you if you won't be so prickly with me." She continued, "It's a little push and pull." Despite what has happened to him, and what Peter says, ABC Soaps In Depth believes Peter "might not be as redeemed as he likes to think."

=== Relationship with Maxie ===
Peter & Maxie's dynamic

I think what is endearing about this date is that you do get to see a lot variety in the colors of their personalities, and how they do their dance — how they find each other when they're nervous or embarrassed, how they sense that in each other — and also how they use their genuine connection to almost instantly calm each other down.

— Wes Ramsey, Soap Opera Digest (2018)

In the meantime, Peter develops a friendship with Maxie Jones, his grieving widowed sister-in-law. Co-head writer Shelly Altman described the relationship as "mutually important" to both Peter and Maxie. While Maxie finds it easy to be around Peter because he isn't a constant reminder of the life she's lost, co-head writer Chris Van Etten explained that it's Peter's "guilt" over his role in his brother's death that draws Peter to Maxie. Peter feels a "responsibility" to take care for Maxie. While they are just friends, Peter knows "he's playing with fire." Peter's attraction to Maxie is "groundbreaking for him," according to Wes Ramsey. It is the first time Peter has ever "had someone in his life that he's wanted to protect." While it appeared to be "casual on the surface" the tragic circumstances that bring them together and the emotions in the aftermath of that tragedy "was such a strong bonding experience" for them. Caring about Maxie is the last thing Peter expected would happen. Peter feels like protecting Maxie and her unborn child can make amends for the pain he has caused. He will risk anything to protect whatever it is he has found with Maxie.

Through his relationship with Maxie, the writers explore how "deprived Peter felt throughout his entire life of having a connection in terms of family, a connection in terms of being able to be vulnerable." For Peter, "his connection to his nephew James is, in his heart, the only pure family that exists for him." Ramsey viewed Peter's "protective streak over Maxie" as "really honest." Kirsten Storms admits that Maxie gives Peter a pass for his schemes because of her own past and how often she's been forgiven. Storms could see why Maxie would be drawn to Peter, as Nathan's brother, even though they are very different. As he starts courting Maxie in 2019, Peter suddenly gets cold feet. According to Wes Ramsey, Peter "doesn't know what to do." Having grown up witnessing how Faison's obsession with Anna consumed his father, Peter is careful to make sure his feelings for Maxie are "true and genuine and coming from a healthy place." The best part for Peter is that he knows Maxie is willing to be as "impulsive" as he is for their first date. "She gets excited about his excitement." Though Maxie insist she does not need a "grand gesture," Peter wants to make it "perfect and special and magical." While they are not young lovers by any stretch of the imagination, "there were moments where I felt those butterflies, and some of those feelings that we remember from when we were younger, get to come out these moments with these two characters."

Storms was happy with Ramsey as her new scene partner. The actress appreciated that he could meet or at times exceed her expectations of preparedness in scene partner. "He cares about his work comes across and not in an arrogant way," Storms said of her co-star. Storms referenced one instance in which Peter reveals his true identity to Maxie. "For example, when he tells Maxie that he’s Henrik in the hospital and she is in a wheelchair, there were four or five other people in that scene who didn’t have dialogue, so there was chatting and laughing going on. He just completely zoned in to what he was doing."

== Storylines ==
In 2017, Peter is hired by "Jason" (Billy Miller) and Sam Morgan (Kelly Monaco) as the COO of their newly acquired media company, Aurora Media, and becomes the boss of Nina Cassadine (Michelle Stafford) and Maxie Jones (Kirsten Storms). Aspiring journalist Lulu Falconeri (Emme Rylan) appeals to Peter for a job, and Peter advises her to bring him a "hard-hitting" story before he considers hiring her. With the revelation that the mysterious Patient 6 is the real Jason and Peter's boss is actually Jason's unknown twin brother Andrew Cain, Peter wants to capitalize on the drama, but Sam shoots down the idea. Peter is quite impressed when Lulu uncovers Mayor Janice Lomax (Shari Belafonte) stole the 2014 election, which leads to her resignation, but tells Lulu she needs an impressive follow story before he would put her on staff. Peter convinces Lulu to do a story on Cesar Faison (Anders Hove), the man responsible for switching Jason and Drew.

Although he is happy with Lulu’s article about Maxie's husband Nathan West (Ryan Paevey) being Faison's son, Peter isn't interested in a follow-up. Peter rejects a suggestion from Anna Devane (Finola Hughes) to plant a fake story about Faison's eldest son Henrik as a trap. Peter is nearly shot defending a pregnant Maxie from Faison. He survives, and helps Maxie care for Nathan, who is caught in the crossfire. Peter confronts a hospitalized Faison, and reveals himself to be Henrik. Peter admits he intentionally kept Jason alive to use him against Faison, and is further delighted when Faison dies from cardiac arrest upon hearing Nathan has died.

Peter steals the flash drive with Drew's memories to conceal his identity. Peter changes his mind about leaving town, having bonded with the widowed Maxie. He is terrified to learn Faison suffered from Huntington's disease and confides in Valentin Cassadine (James Patrick Stuart), who convinces him to get tested. Peter is relieved when both he and Maxie's unborn child have not inherited the disease, but Nina accuses him of taking advantage of Maxie's grief. When his doctor Griffin Munro (Matt Cohen) confronts Peter about his identity, Peter convinces him to keep quiet for Maxie's sake. Against Valentin's wishes, Peter orders Lulu to write an article about Henrik, and even contacts her as Henrik. Peter warns Valentin to neutralize Anna and Robert Scorpio (Tristan Rogers) when he learns they have been investigating Henrik.

Peter is contacted by a woman claiming to be his mother, and agrees to meet her at the Nurses' Ball. Peter ends up delivering Maxie and Nathan's son, his nephew, James West. He goes to meet the mystery woman, and finds Anna. Peter is shocked when Anna stops Jason from killing Peter by announcing she is his mother. Peter rejects Anna as he is arrested. Peter is furious to learn Valentin stole him from his adopted family, and delivered him to Faison; he guilt trips him into breaking him out of jail. Peter tries to skip town when he is abducted by Nathan's distraught mother, Liesl Obrecht (Kathleen Gati), who tries to torture him into confessing. After a failed escape attempt in which Obrecht breaks his hand, Peter appeals to Nina to let him go before she ends up in prison, along with Obrecht. Obrecht then moves Peter to the stables at Wyndemere Castle when she is nearly caught. She tries to kill Peter in a fire, but he is rescued by Anna's boyfriend, Hamilton Finn (Michael Easton). Finn stalls Peter’s arrest, refusing to release him from the hospital. To avoid prosecution, Peter trades information for his freedom. After his release, Peter coerces Valentin into giving him the money to buy local tabloid, The Invader, and hires Lulu as a reporter. Peter continues bonding with Maxie after she helps him through a panic attack, and they spend her birthday together.

Peter continues thawing toward Anna, and supports her when she suddenly goes blind. Meanwhile, Peter and Maxie discover Obrecht is blackmailing Valentin about Sasha Gilmore (Sofia Mattsson), whom he claims is Nina's daughter. However, their secret DNA test proves their theory wrong. In April 2019, Peter takes Anna's advice and finally confesses his feelings for Maxie, and they soon start dating.

Soon, convicted cult leader Shiloh (Coby Ryan McLaughlin) blackmails Peter into breaking him out of prison by threatening to reveal Peter's role in the abduction of Drew Cain from Afghanistan. When Drew leaves town, determined to get his memory back, Peter makes sure Drew's plane crashes to keep himself from being implicated. Peter even tries to kill Andre when he returns, looking for Drew. While Peter successfully breaks Shiloh out of prison, his attempt to eliminate him goes awry when Shiloh escapes from his hired henchman. Shiloh tries to blackmail Peter, only to end up dead after a confrontation with Sam. Peter frames Sam for Shiloh's escape, then hires an assassin to kill Andre and Franco Baldwin (Roger Howarth), but changes his mind and kills the assassin. Both Anna and Robert suspect that Peter is involved in the attempted assassinations, as well as Drew's death. To keep them from finding out the truth, Peter frames Obrecht for his crimes, which leads to her getting arrested and sent to prison. When Robert isn't convinced of Obrecht's guilt, Peter orders someone to provide a "distraction" for Robert, leading Holly Sutton (Emma Samms) to be presumed dead.

Soon after, during the Nurses' Ball, Maxie accidentally reveals that she's pregnant with Peter's child. Peter is overjoyed, and vows to be a better father to his child than Faison was to him. He and Maxie get engaged soon after. Anna and Valentin find out that Anna's sister, Alex Marick (Finola Hughes), is actually Peter's mother, not Anna. Alex returns to town, and kidnaps Maxie, but Anna manages to save her and shoot Alex, who is presumed dead. After Lulu is injured in a bombing and lapses into a coma, Maxie and Peter agree to name their unborn daughter Louise, to honor Lulu.

Valentin and Anna realize that Peter framed Obrecht, and kidnap him on his and Maxie's wedding day, hoping Maxie will think Peter stood her up. Peter escapes, though, and makes it to the ceremony. However, Obrecht crashes it, revealing she's been exonerated, and plays a tape Alex left behind, revealing she's Peter's mother. Peter is shocked and dismayed by this revelation, and is upset when Valentin & Anna reveal they knew, and also expose his crimes. Maxie starts having contractions, and is rushed to the hospital. Peter is held back by Robert and others, but escapes and tries to make his way to the hospital. Franco, though, kidnaps him, having realized from Drew's memories embedded in him what Peter did to Drew. He tries to get Peter to confess to his crimes, but Peter breaks free and kills Franco in a struggle. He goes to Maxie, and tries to convince her that all the accusations are lies, but she doesn't believe him, and tells him to leave.

Peter continuously tries to get Maxie to give him a second chance, stalking her and becoming obsessed after she kicks him out of her apartment. When the police start investigating him, he teams up with mob boss Cyrus Renault (Jeff Kober), who arranges to implicate Jason in Franco's death. Anna and Valentin, however, realize Peter is responsible, and try to find evidence. Peter covers his tracks, so Anna & Valentin kidnap him to keep Maxie and her baby safe. However, Peter comes up with his own plan to keep Anna at bay, and tries to poison Finn. Instead, Finn's younger brother, Harrison Chase (Josh Swickard), winds up being poisoned. Anna is forced to let Peter go in order to get an antidote that will keep Chase alive.

Peter demands Anna help him reconcile with Maxie, wanting to be there when his daughter is born. Anna convinces Maxie to meet Peter by revealing what he did to Chase. Peter suggests Maxie hire a live-in nurse to help out with her pregnancy, and Maxie agrees to find someone. However, when she finds a candidate, Peter replaces her with someone he hired to smuggle Maxie and her baby out of the country with Peter.

Peter realizes the walls are closing in when Cyrus' plan falls apart. He has the nurse kidnap Maxie to deliver the baby so they can leave town together. Maxie, though, winds up getting away from the nurse, and ends up in the hospital, where Peter finds her. She tells him that her nurse kidnapped their daughter, Louise, after Maxie gave birth. Maxie confronts Peter about his various crimes, screaming that he put their daughter in danger. Peter vows to find Louise, but Maxie turns him in, having recorded their conversation. Peter leaves, vowing to find Louise. He heads to the roof, trying to escape, but is stopped by Finn, who wants the antidote to save Chase. Peter throws it off the roof, and a furious Finn runs after Peter and throws him down the stairs, killing him. He and Elizabeth Webber (Rebecca Herbst), Franco's widow, hide Peter's body in the hospital basement lab.

In July, Finn confesses to Anna that he killed Peter, but kept Elizabeth out of his confession. Finn leads Anna down to the basement lab where they open the freezer, only to find it empty. Finn is shocked, but Anna considers the possibility that Peter could still be alive. In August, Peter was revealed to be alive and has been stalking Maxie in Nixon Falls. He is surprised to see Sonny Corinthos (Maurice Benard) alive, but realizes that Sonny has amnesia, so he introduces himself as Peter Sinclair, an author. When Sonny takes Peter inside a bar to get him a glass of water, Peter and Nina see each other, which shocks Nina.

Peter blackmails Nina into helping him find Louise by threatening to kidnap his nephew, James West and telling Carly Corinthos (Laura Wright) about her hiding Sonny from everyone for months. Nina calls Obrecht and tells her about Peter, so Obrecht instructs her to give him a false lead. Nina claims that there’s a lead on Louise in St. Lucia, so he leaves. He returns, however, when he figures out that Nina lied to him and Obrecht planned to kill him. Peter ties Nina and her friend, Phyllis Caulfield up in the bar, sets the place on fire and left them there.

Peter is later seen trying to make arrangements to get out of Nixon Falls, but Anna and Valentin find Peter and confront him at gunpoint. He escapes, however, by jumping off a cliff. He reappears on a compound ran by Victor Cassadine (Charles Shaughnessy), who was revealed to be alive. Victor and Peter were revealed to be working together, plus they’ve been holding Drew Cain (Cameron Mathison) prisoner for two years after faking his death in 2019. Victor wants Peter to give him the key to controlling Drew through his second level of conditioning, but Peter claims he hasn’t found it yet. However, Peter visits Drew in his cell and activates his conditioning, forcing him to try to kill Robert and Anna. The mission fails, however, after Robert and Anna shot back. After Peter has Obrecht take care of Drew’s bullet graze, Victor learns what Peter’s been up to and orders his men to kill him, but Peter turns the tables and has Victor taken hostage by his own men. After Peter orders a guard to kill Victor and Valentin if they move, he goes to program Drew again, but is seemingly overpowered. As Drew helps Valentin escape, Peter appears on a footbridge and shoots Valentin in the back and fakes Drew’s death again. Peter forced Drew to help him kidnap Obrecht again, stage Valentin’s rescue and help fake his death again before they fled to Cassadine Island.

Jason and Britt tracked them down, but we’re taken hostage by Peter. Jason and Drew were chained together in a wine cellar, while Britt was being held in a room. After Peter gives a demonstration on how he can control Drew, he later orders Drew to be brought up. After Jason escapes from the wine cellar, Peter forces Drew to kill Jason as he takes Britt and Obrecht with him. Down in the tunnels, Drew suddenly finds them and threatens to kill Peter, who is surprised to see Drew back in his right mind. Peter tries to activate Drew, but Jason shoots Peter in the arm and a shootout happens. The tunnels collapse, and Jason is presumed dead. The WSB finally arrests Peter as they rescue Drew, Britt and Obrecht.

Back in Port Charles, Peter is treated at the hospital for his injuries before being taken to prison, where he is poisoned by Brad Cooper (Parry Shen), so he is sent back to the hospital and falls into a coma. The following year, he wakes up, and Victor comes to see him in hopes of getting the key to controlling Drew, by telling him that Louise has been in Port Charles this whole time. In February, the PCPD take him back to prison, but the van crashes, and Peter escapes. He kidnaps Louise and Charlotte Cassadine before meeting with Victor, who plans to have him killed after getting the key. When Peter reveals he kidnapped Charlotte, Victor forces him to reveal where Charlotte is, and is forced to let him go after Peter gives him Charlotte’s location. After Victor and his men go find Charlotte, Peter calls Maxie and orders her to meet him on the docks. When Maxie arrives, he forces her to either say goodbye to Louise forever or come with them out of the country. Maxie convinces Peter to let Louise go, and willingly flees town with him.

Peter takes Maxie to Switzerland, where she initially plays nice until he gives her a veiled threat. After Maxie reminds him of how he’s responsible for Faison killing Nathan and how she let him play her, she manages to escape. Peter tracks Maxie down and tries to kill her, but Felicia Scorpio (Kristina Wagner) hits him over the head with a tire iron, causing him to fall down a slope and lose consciousness. He wakes up, calling for Maxie, who refuses to give him any sympathy. After Drew, Felicia and Maxie leave, Anna stays with Peter until the end, while letting him die from his injuries.

== Reception ==
The Best and Worst of GH 2018

Another of my favorite things of 2018 was the fall from grace and slow climb back to redemption for Peter August. Wes Ramsey is a wonderful addition to the GH canvas. I love the chemistry he has with Maxie and basically with everyone on the show. He's extremely likable. I do have a slight problem with the revisionist history that says he is Anna and Faison's son. As sick as Faison was, I can't believe he wouldn't have used Peter's existence get into her head (or her bed) if he had that chip to play. He tormented and stalked Anna for decades and never mentioned that he was raising their love child? Hard to swallow.

— Tamilu, Soapcentral.com (2018)

=== Casting and portrayal ===
Michael Fairman described the announcement about Ramsey's hiring as "intriguing casting news." TV Fanatic's Caralynn Lippo and Stacy Miller from The Nerdy Girl Express were both fans of Ramsey from his role as Wyatt on the prime time supernatural drama Charmed. Actress Finola Hughes didn't think the storyline would come to fruition even though she'd auditioned with several actors, until Ramsey was hired. Liz Masters from Soapcentral.com thought Wes Ramsey should have been a recast of Nathan West instead. However, by April 2018, Masters began to change her tune about the character. "Wes Ramsey is a handsome bugger, so it's getting harder and harder not to be pulled in by Peter's charm." Masters felt Peter was a "good guy" and felt keeping the character would be good for the canvas. Lippo said "I'm really into Wes Ramsey's addition to the cast so far." Lippo further praised Wes Ramsey for "successfully selling the idea that Peter truly isn't just a carbon copy of Faison." Miller said thanks to Ramsey's portrayal, "there's no black and white answer for Henrik's guilt or innocence, victim or villainy, only shades of gray. The character is constantly evolving, which makes Peter August a.k.a. Henrik Faison a fascinating study of nature vs. nurture." In June 2018, Shabnaj Chowdhury also praised Ramsey for his portrayal of the character and said "what makes this revelation — that Peter is actual Henrik, Anna’s long-lost son — really compelling is Wes Ramsey’s nuanced portrayal… Peter has emerged as a complex character worth noticing." Soapcentral.com's Tamilu said "I do like Peter August, though, and I hope Wes Ramsey sticks around." Alina Adams said it was "difficult" to decipher if Peter is a "good guy or a bad guy."

=== Introduction and redemption ===
Sound Off: Love It/Hate It

This latest revelation works for us on a whole lotta levels, not the least of which is that it once again put Finola Hughes (Anna) and James Patrick Stuart (Valentin) into scenes. Plus, what better way to keep Faison's legacy going than by having Anna contend with their child… We get many viewers aren't buying this rewrite of Anna's history, but we can't diss a vet getting big, fun material!

— ABC Soaps In Depth (2018)

The revelation about Peter's identity garnered both positive and negative reactions from critics. Hope Campbell of Soap Hub was disappointed with the reveal that Peter was the one who betrayed Faison because she felt the traitor should have been an established veteran instead of a new character. ABC Soaps In Depth called the reveal "fantastically soapy." Janet Di Lauro described the "stunning" plot twist of Peter being Anna's son as the "shock of all shockers. Stacy Miller said "Henrik’s story is a classic example of a Shakespeare tragedy full of what ifs." In June 2018, TV Insider listed the revelation about Peter as one of the show's "8 Best Moments of 2018 So Far." In July 2018, ABC Soaps In Depth featured hailed the plot as the "Most Shocking Twist" of the year "So far." Donald Thompson of Canyon News was "absolutely floored" by the revelation that Anna is Henrik's mother. He also said "seeing Peter exude his dark will be fun to witness." Liz Masters felt the plot twist was "convoluted" and said "The idea that Anna gave birth to her homicidal stalker's baby makes me ill." Caralynn Lippo didn't like the idea of Anna being with Faison, but appreciated the "dramatic and major storyline" for Anna's portrayer, Finola Hughes. Finola Hughes did not see the plot twist as a "rewrite" specifically because she never agreed with the notion that Robert was Anna's "first," which was a point of contention for many viewers. However, Hughes thought it was "insane" when she found out about it. Meanwhile, ABC Soaps In Depth pointed out how Anna and Robert's romance started under less than honest circumstances, which includes hiding Robin from Robert.

Hope Campbell argued that Peter being Faison and Anna's son was "horrid enough" but "the character COULD have stayed contained." She continued, "we do not understand why this character was necessary, but since he's there, why oh why is he EVERYWHERE?" Tamilu of Soapcentral.com agreed with Campbell's complaints about the story's overexposure. While she liked the character and the story, it's "all Henrik all the time" and "I'm ready for the truth to come out." On the other hand, Caralynn Lippo liked how the story took centerstage and involved several different sets of characters. ABC Soaps In Depth agreed and appreciated the "umbrella" aspect of the story. The magazine liked that like that Peter was the "catalyst propelling other, more established characters into the spotlight, even as we get to know him a little bit better." Peter successfully orchestrating Faison's demise was "quite surprising" for Donald Thompson. "It was slightly overwhelming to say the least." Meanwhile, Faison's portrayer, Anders Hove was very interested to see what Peter would do next.

Caralynn Lippo was very excited about the impending revelation. "I'm actually really looking forward to the eventual Peter-is-Henrik reveal and the ramifications that will be seen all over the canvas." She said the "fall out" would make for "amazing soap." While some felt the story did not work, Donald Thompson felt the climax was one of the reasons the show was so interesting during May Sweeps. Thompson was also pleasantly surprised the writers didn't "drag out" the revelation about Peter's true identity and said the reveal made for an "awfully juicy" May Sweeps. Of all the aspects of the story, Liz Masters said the most interesting component was Peter's history with Valentin and she also looked forward to Peter and Anna's reunion. "Having a son around will do Anna a world of good, especially with Robin and the kids living on the other side of the country." of the reunion, Masters said it happened in "true dramatic fashion" and despite his failed attempt on Anna's life, "I'm really growing to like him." According to Masters, the confrontation scenes exceeded expectations. "The pain in Peter's expression as she revealed that Valentin had threatened his adoptive parents and given him to Faison, and the tears in his eyes when Anna announced that she refused to testify against her son, gutted me."

Tamilu from Soapcentral.com hoped Peter could be "redeemable." She said "Don't take [him] so far over the line that we can never love [him] again, because I really want to love [him]…" While Michael Fairman felt it provided great material for the actors involved, he felt Peter's abduction played onscreen for entirely too long. ABC Soaps In Depth agreed that while the plot provided great material for the actors, "it's also deprived the audience of a bigger payoff" due to the isolation from the canvas. Frank Valentini praised Ramsey's performance during the storyline. "I think he did a phenomenal job when Peter was kidnapped and tied-up. It’s not easy to be in scenes where you are tied-up for almost four weeks, and to act, and to stay present in the stage of being a hostage." Liz Masters applauded the writers for "misleading" the viewers with the "cliffhanger" of Nina finding Peter, when Obrecht was the real culprit. She also praised Ramsey for his "magnificent" portrayal "because the anguish Peter felt was palpable, right down to his shaking hands and quivering chin." She said the "scenes belong on an Emmy reel." Tamilu said while the storyline could be amusing at times, "it's time for the story to move along." She continued, "I am weary of Peter being chained up." Meanwhile, Liz Masters said the story "quickly faded from compelling" to "torture watching Peter's torture."

In December 2018, the storyline was featured on TV Insider's list of the "20 Craziest Daytime Soap Moments" of the year. Soap Opera Digest hailed the story as the "Biggest Rewrite" of the year and said it "required a greater suspension of disbelief than most." ABC Soaps In Depth ranked Peter's story at #6 on its list of the "10 Biggest Stories of 2018. The plot "not only brought back Anders Hove to the canvas, it added to the cast soap vet Wes Ramsey as Peter and gave Anna's portrayer some especially juicy material."

=== Romance ===
Liz Masters on Maxie & Peter

What a difference a year makes, because this time last year, I was strongly opposed to a romance between Maxie and Peter. I was still upset about Nathan's death, and I hadn't gotten to know Peter beyond the fact that he was Faison's son and a part of the mess that cost Nathan his life. However, time -- and the decision to make Peter a good guy rather than a chip off of Faison's rotten block -- has changed my view of Peter and of his relationship with Maxie. Maxie deserves some happiness after everything she's been through.

— Liz Masters, Soapcentral.com (2018)

In regards to Maxie falling for Peter only to learn of his treachery, Tamilu of Soapcentral.com said "Oh, the drama!" While TV Fanatic's Caralynn Lippo felt it was a soon for Maxie to enter into another romance in 2018, the writers are "laying great groundwork for a nice, slow-burn Maxie/Peter romance." Lippo said that while she enjoyed Peter's budding friendship with Maxie, she was "concerned" that it was being rushed. "Unfortunately, they've rapidly progressed from acquaintances to shirtless run-ins and sitting on a bed together while they're hotel neighbors." However, Lippo appreciated the "Soapy eye candy" and said Ramsey is "nice to look at." However, "It's a nice dynamic" she said. While she liked their "sweet" friendship, Liz Masters felt it was still too soon for a romance between Peter and Maxie. Despite agreeing with the general consensus that it was too soon, ABC Soaps In Depth said "we can't help seeing the possibilities" because of Wes Ramsey's "undeniable" chemistry with Kirsten Storms. The magazine praised the "natural ease" between Ramsey and Storms and said "the inherent drama is too good to pass up!" Tamilu worried Maxie might not forgive Peter for his betrayal and said it's "a damned shame, since I like the connection they have." She admitted that she was open to Maxie and Peter's eventual romance "because I am in incurable romantic, and I love redemption stories." By September 2018, Tamilu was a bit exhausted by the waiting game. She said "I wish we had one writer who wanted to actually write a couple together." Tamilu found "genuine delight" in their budding romance. While she grew to like the pairing, Liz Masters admitted she wasn't ready for Maxie to move on. Masters felt it was "easier" to accept Maxie moving on because she was the one pursuing Peter. Soapcentral.com listed Peter and Maxie's relationship as one of the best parts of General Hospital in 2018. In January 2019, Tamilu agreed that it was the right time for Maxie to move on with Peter. "I really love her and Peter together." Even with the return of Maxie former lover, Spinelli, Tamilu still rooted for Peter and Maxie. In May 2019, Liz Masters said she felt Maxie needed a bit of a push to solidify her relationship with Peter. "Maxie is the type of person who has a better appreciation for things that she has to work for, and I don't feel as if Maxie has worked all that hard for Peter." Meanwhile, Tamilu was annoyed with the "stall tactics" that plagued Maxie and Peter's first date and felt the writers should stop dragging the story out. ABC Soaps In Depth said that while the pairing was obvious, but praised the writers for "wisely" not rushing Peter and Maxie into a romance. The magazine felt that Peter "massive amount of baggage" and Maxie's "checkered past" made the two "downright perfect for one another."

Majority of viewers were initially against the pairing. A May 2018 fan poll revealed that 81% of ABC Soaps In Depth readers felt it was too soon for Maxie to move on with Peter. However, by 2019 many viewers had come around to the idea of a Maxie/Peter pairing. Majority of Soap Hub readers (57% of 11,000) loved Maxie and Peter's chemistry and were excited about the dramatic potential should they come together. In November 2018, Peter and Maxie made their debut at #8 on ABC Soaps In Depth's "Top 10 Couples" poll. That same month, the magazine asked readers if they preferred Maxie be paired with Peter or Michael Corinthos (Chad Duell) and Peter won the fan vote with 54%. In January 2019, Maxie and Peter ranked at #4 in the overall couples poll and the third most popular pairing in the series amongst ABC Soaps In Depth readers. ABC Soaps In Depth said "Slow and steady seems to be not only the way to win the race, but to convince a reluctant audience" that Peter is worthy of Maxie. 75% of their readers felt Maxie and Peter were meant to be. One reader, Michelle Jenkins was all for the pairing and said Maxie "makes [Peter] want to be a better person." Blane Puglies liked the idea of Maxie and Peter, but was worried he would take advantage for her feelings for him, similar to Valentin's dynamic with Nina. Linda Morgan Johnson preferred the two as just friends, while Maureen Bartek refused to accept the pairing. Sharon Magnan felt Peter worked better as a villain instead of a reformed good guy. "As a good guy, he's bland and boring. Maxie needs much more than that."

=== Fan reaction ===
Like critics, the reactions from fans was mixed. Aurora Suarez described the plot a "travesty" and a "slap in the face" to those who watched Anna from the beginning. Theresa K. Wicoff said it was "terrible attempt to shock the audience." Meanwhile, Rhonda Robertson said "I actually think the story works the way they told it" felt it would making for "interesting" story. Linda LeColst also liked the plot. ABC Soaps In Depth ran a poll in which 79% of readers felt Peter had paid enough for his actions after the abduction and torture. Nancy Dash loved the kidnapping said Peter "deserves worse if you ask me." Tammy McKinney said "What would GH be without a good kidnapping?" Meanwhile, Patricia Wade didn't like the story at all. "The torturing of Peter is more like the movie Misery and if I wanted to watch violence, I can watch nighttime TV or a movie!" Hope Campbell went so far as to blame Peter's origin story, couple with other stories when the series fell to last place in the ratings in May 2018. She continued, "Despite fan backlash, despite falling ratings, there’s Peter." ABC Soaps In Depth also took note of the ratings decline during the story's climax and how many fans voiced their displeasure on social media about Peter monopolizing the canvas. "I'm not going to be shy about it. My Twitter feed is not happy," Hughes said during an interview with the publication. The magazine noted that the show did acknowledge the viewer criticism by having Robert talk Anna out blaming herself for Peter's actions in story. Soap Opera Digest said "By underestimating its fans' tolerance for tampering with Anna's canon, GH delivered a tale that got them talking for all the wrong reasons." Michael Fairman TV called Peter the "Most Polarizing Character" of the year. "We have never seen such different views from the audience for one character. Many loathe the character of Peter August and want him off the canvas, others like the portrayal by Ramsey, and throughout 2018 as the character had plenty of screen-time. Fans were one way, or the other, on this one." Despite a rough first year, in May 2019, Ramsey made his debut on ABC Soaps In Depth's "Top 5 Actors" poll when he was voted in by readers, landing at number five.
