= Michael Nader =

American actor (1945–2021)

- Nader in Dynasty, 1983
- Born: February 19, 1945; St. Louis, Missouri, U.S.
- Died: August 23, 2021 (aged 76); San Francisco, California, U.S.
- Occupation: Actor
- Years active: 1963–2013
- Spouses: Robin Weiss; Jodi Lister
- Children: 1
- Relatives: George Nader (uncle)

Michael Nader (February 19, 1945 – August 23, 2021) was an American actor, known for his roles as Dex Dexter on the ABC primetime soap opera Dynasty from 1983 to 1989 and Dimitri Marick on the ABC daytime soap opera All My Children from 1991 to 2001 and in 2013. He also starred as Kevin Thompson on the soap opera As the World Turns from 1975 to 1978.

== Early life ==
Nader was born on February 19, 1945, in St. Louis, Missouri. He was of German, Yugoslavian and Lebanese descent. Nader was a nephew of actor George Nader. His parents split a few months after his birth. At the age of six, he was hit by a drunk driver, which left him with a visible facial scar. Nader accompanied his mother, Minette, when she moved to Los Angeles to pursue an entertainment career.

At 16, Nader was one of three young surfers featured in a September 1961 Life photo with George Jones spread accompanying the article "The Mad, Happy Surfers: A Way of Life on the Wavetops". He graduated from Palisades Charter High School in 1963.

== Career ==
Nader began his acting career in 1963 with small roles in several of American International Pictures Beach Party films, then billed as "Mike Nader". He later appeared in the recurring role of Siddo in the 1965–66 TV series Gidget and had a small role in the 1968 film Blue. Nader's first soap opera role was playing Kevin Thompson on As the World Turns from 1975 to 1978. In 1983, he appeared in the NBC prime time soap opera Bare Essence as Alexi Theopolis.

Nader won the role of Farnsworth "Dex" Dexter, the eventual third husband of Alexis Colby (Joan Collins), on the prime time soap opera Dynasty in 1983. He remained on the series until its cancellation in 1989. Nader appeared as Nazi officer Burchhardt in the 1988 television film The Great Escape II: The Untold Story. The same year, he co-starred as Nick Scalfone in the TV movie Lady Mobster. In 1990, he appeared as Enzio Bonnatti in the miniseries Lucky Chances.

Nader returned to soap operas in 1991, portraying Dimitri Marick, the husband of Erica Kane (Nader's Lady Mobster costar Susan Lucci), on the daytime drama All My Children. He played the role from 1991 to 1999 and from 2000 to 2001. Nader returned for All My Children's online revival in 2013. Nader also appeared in episodes of other television series, including The Flash (1991), Law & Order: Special Victims Unit (2002) and Cold Case (2009).

== Personal life ==
=== Marriages and family ===
Nader dated actress Ellen Barber for 10 years, with the relationship ending around the same time as his role on As the World Turns. Nader married Robin Weiss in June 1984, and a month later they had a daughter. He was married to Jodi Lister at the time of his death, with the couple having been together for 18 years.

=== Drug addiction and legal issues ===
In 1984, Nader admitted to previously having drug and drinking problems, which prompted him to become sober in 1980. He was charged with drunk driving in 1997, and in 2001 was arrested for attempting to sell cocaine to an undercover police officer. Nader was let go from his role on All My Children soon after, with a statement from ABC that if he resolved his issues they would rehire him. It was more than a decade before they did, Nader meanwhile sued the network, alleging that they never intended to bring him back to the show at all.

=== Death ===
Nader died on August 23, 2021, at the age of 76 at his home, ten days after being diagnosed with an untreatable form of cancer.

Nader had long been rumored to have been HIV positive. Speculation about his health first abounded in 2001 following his arrest and subsequent firing from All My Children. Nader vehemently denied having HIV. However, following his death, his daughter Lindsay revealed in an Instagram post that her father had, in fact, lived with HIV for several decades; he had contracted the virus before she was born and was one of the longest known survivors.

== Filmography ==
=== Film ===
Year	Title	Role	Notes
1963	Beach Party	Beach Boy	
1964	Muscle Beach Party	Surfer Boy	
1964	For Those Who Think Young	College Boy	
1964	Bikini Beach	Surfer #8	
1964	Pajama Party	Pajama Boy	
1965	Beach Blanket Bingo	Butch	
1965	Ski Party	Bobby	
1965	How to Stuff a Wild Bikini	Mike	
1965	Sergeant Deadhead	Air Policeman	
1966	Three on a Couch	Young Man	Uncredited
1966	Fireball 500	Joey	
1967	Don't Make Waves	Surfer	Uncredited
1992	The Finishing Touch	Sam Stone	
1996	Fled	Frank Mantajano	

=== Television ===
Year	Title	Role	Notes
1965–1966	Gidget	Siddo / Peter Stone	9 episodes
1975–1978	As the World Turns	Kevin Thompson	
1981	Magnum, P.I.	Mitch Caldwell	Episode: "The Ugliest Dog in Hawaii"
1983	Bare Essence	Alexi Theophilus	5 episodes
1983–1989	Dynasty	Farnsworth "Dex" Dexter	Main role; 152 episodes
1984	Finder of Lost Loves	Kent Halliday	Episode: "Portraits"
1988	Lady Mobster	Nick Scalfone	Television film
1988	The Great Escape II: The Untold Story	Burchardt	Television film
1989	Nick Knight	Lacroix	Television film
1990	Lucky Chances	Enzio Bonnatti	3 episodes
1990–1991	The Flash	Nicholas Pike	2 episodes
1991	Perry Mason: The Case of the Maligned Mobster	Johnny Sorrento	Television film
1991–2001	All My Children	Dimitri Marick	Main role; 405 episodes
2002	Law & Order: Special Victims Unit	Robert Prescott	Episode: "Surveillance"
2009	Cold Case	Tucker "Duke" Benton	Episode: "The Crossing"
2013	All My Children	Dimitri Marick	Main role; 42 episodes
