= Wes Ramsey =

American actor

- Born: October 6, 1977 (age 48); Louisville, Kentucky, U.S.
- Education: Juilliard School (BFA)
- Occupation: Actor
- Years active: 2000–present

Wes Ramsey (born October 6, 1977) is an American actor. He is known for his performance in the romantic drama film Latter Days, and for playing Sam Spencer on the CBS daytime soap opera Guiding Light and for his recurring role as Wyatt Halliwell on The WB supernatural drama Charmed. He portrayed Peter August on the ABC soap opera General Hospital.

== Early life ==
He attended the Juilliard School's drama division as a member of Group 29 (1996–2000), which also included Morena Baccarin and Glenn Howerton.

== Career ==
Ramsey's first major acting role was playing Sam Spencer on the CBS daytime soap opera Guiding Light, a role he portrayed over the next eight years.

In 2003, Ramsey played Greg on the short-lived Fox comedy series Luis. The same year he was cast in a starring role in the independent film Latter Days. In 2011, Ramsey was cast in the main role of Max on the short-lived NBC historical drama series The Playboy Club.

== Filmography ==
=== Film ===
Year	Title	Role	Notes
2001	Way Off Broadway		
2003	Latter Days	Christian Markelli	
2005	Cavatina		
2005	Slippery Slope	Martin Breedlove	
2005	Bitter Sweet	Conrad	
2006	L.A. Dicks	Studio executive	
2006	Brotherhood of Blood	Fork	
2006	Bickford Shmeckler's Cool Ideas	Rob, the make-out guy	
2008	Bram Stoker's Dracula's Guest	Bram Stoker	
2008	Dark Honeymoon	Jay	Direct-to-video film
2018	Two Pictures	Conrad	
2018	Last Seen in Idaho	Franco	
2018	Perception	Daniel	

=== Television ===
Year	Title	Role	Notes
2000–2004, 2008	Guiding Light	Sam Spencer	Regular role
2003	Luis	Greg	Main role
2003	CSI: Miami	Kip Miller	Episode: "Spring Break"
2003–2006	Charmed	Wyatt Halliwell	4 episodes (seasons 6–8)
2007	Reign of the Gargoyles	Will 'Ace' McCallister	Television film
2009, 2026	Days of Our Lives	Owen Kent	Recurring role
2009	Heroes	Roy	2 Episodes
2009	The Immortal Voyage of Captain Drake	Peter Easton	Television film
2009–2012	CSI: Miami	Dave Benton	Recurring role, 25 episodes
2010	House M.D.	Miles	Episode: "Knight Fall"
2010	The Event	Greg Kevin	2 episodes
2010	CSI: NY	Dave Benton	Episode: "Hammer Down" (part of the CSI Trilogy)
2010–2014	Venice: The Series	Van	Regular role, 24 episodes
2011	The Playboy Club	Max	Main role, 7 episodes
2013	Grey's Anatomy	Jimmy McAdams	Episode: "Walking on a Dream"
2013	The Mentalist	Charlie	Episode: "Wedding in Red"
2013	Castle	John Henson	Episode: "Like Father, Like Daughter"
2014	Pretty Little Liars	Jesse Lindahl	Episodes: "Hot For Teacher", "Bite Your Tongue"
2014	Stalker	Jason Walker	Episode: "Crazy for You"
2014	Deliverance Creek	Nate	Television film (backdoor pilot)
2017	A Bunch of Dicks	Thad	Television film
2017–2022, 2026	General Hospital	Peter August	Regular role
2021	Sidetracked	Donovan	Web series; recurring role

== Theater ==
Year	Title
2007–2008	As Much As You Can
2012	Grace Notes and Anvils
