= Soap Hub =

American online magazine

- Website type: Online magazine
- Available in: English
- Founded: 2014
- Headquarters: United States
- Owner: AllGear Digital (2018–present)
- Founder: Ramon van Meer
- Website: soaphub.com/
- Current status: Active

Soap Hub is an online magazine that covers American daytime soap operas. It features on-screen and off-screen news about both current and past soap operas, interviews with daytime stars, article updates about the stars' lives, storyline summaries and previews. While its focus is on the five remaining daytime soap operas—The Young and the Restless, General Hospital, Days of our Lives, The Bold and the Beautiful, and Beyond The Gates—past soaps are often featured, as well as news about the up-and-coming web soap industry.
