= Alex Marick =

- All My Children character
- Portrayed by: Finola Hughes
- Duration: 1999–2001; 2017; 2019–2021
- First appearance: July 23, 1999
- Last appearance: March 3, 2021
- Created by: Agnes Nixon, Elizabeth Page and Jean Passanante
- Introduced by: Jean Dadario Burke (1999); Frank Valentini (2017, 2019)
- Crossover appearances: General Hospital
In-universe information
- Other names: Alexandra Devane; Alexandra Marick; Anna Devane; Tess Durbeyfield
- Occupation: Businesswoman; Neurologist
- Father: Thomas Devane
- Adoptive parents: Fredrick Devane; Charlotte Devane
- Sisters: Anna Devane; Lindsay Devane
- Half-brothers: Gabriel Devane
- Spouse: Dimitri Marick (1999–2013)
- Children: Peter August
- Grandchildren: Louise Jones
- Uncles: Fredrick Devane
- Aunts: Rose
- Nieces and nephews: Aidan Devane; Robin Scorpio; Leora Hayward

Alexandra "Alex" Devane Marick is a fictional character from All My Children, an American soap opera on the ABC network. The role was portrayed by Finola Hughes from 1999 to 2001. The character is the twin sister of fan favorite General Hospital character Anna Devane, who Hughes also brought to All My Children from 2001 to 2003. In 2017, Hughes reprised the role on General Hospital, when Alex began posing as Anna, and continued until 2021.

== Casting ==
Finola Hughes was cast as Alexandra Devane in 1999. At first, it was unknown what character she would portray. Alexandra debuted on July 23, 1999. Hughes left in the fall of 2000 for maternity leave and returned in February 2001. Alex left on July 9, 2001, to Budapest, Hungary.

Hughes reprised her role as Alexandra on General Hospital, beginning April 5, 2017, masquerading as Anna; the duplicity wasn't revealed until May 12, 2017. Hughes ended her reprisal role of Alexandra on June 8, 2017. Hughes reprised the role from March 18 to 21, 2019.

In 2020, Hughes once again reprised the role of Alex while portraying Anna from October 30 to November 9.

== Storylines ==
Alexandra and new husband, Dimitri Marick, were headed back to town from London to break the news of their marriage. Before they could tell the good news, Dimitri fell ill and subsequently died. She elected to remain hidden at the airport while Dimitri and his loved ones traveled to Seaview Hospital to see if there was anything the doctors could do to resurrect Dimitri.

Alex finally made her presence known when Edmund Grey asked that an autopsy be done on his brother to determine the cause of his death. Alex stepped forward and announced an autopsy would not be performed. Edmund said he was Dimitri's brother and would decide what was to be done. It was then Alex dropped the bombshell that she was the new Mrs Marick. Erica Kane did not take well to the news Dimitri had found another lover.

Many doubted Alex's sincerity and feelings for Dimitri, but Peggy and Brooke English both could see the affection in her eyes. When alone, Alex would reflect on happier times with Dimitri. They had made plans to start a family together and re-settle in Pine Valley. There was also talk of Alexandra agreeing to do something quite odd for Dimitri, but what this was not revealed. Alex continued to act strangely to her husband's death, refusing to share the medical report findings and then ordering a closed casket funeral.

Edmund managed to get the casket open, and found nothing inside. Alex admitted Dimitri was still alive, dying from a debilitating illness. He'd begged her to not let his friends and family see him so weak and to stage his death instead. Edmund refused to accept his brother writing off survival so quickly and persuaded Alex and Dimitri to try stem cell therapy to save his life. Amazingly, the treatments began to work, but one day Dimitri wandered near the ocean. His dressing down was found at the shore, and his loved ones could only assume he was dead. Alex and Edmund got off to a rocky start, but slowly they fell in love and planned to be married. Alex was having strange flashes of memory and began to wonder if she was going insane, or if she was Anna Devane, a look-alike who had been presumed dead almost 10 years earlier in a boat explosion. In actuality, Alex's "loving" mother Charlotte had once placed her in a brainwashing facility (disguised as a mental hospital) and forced her into becoming a secret agent in a terrorist organization. Alex was supposed to kill Anna.

When she couldn't go through with it, Charlotte had her crew kill Anna and implanted false memories in Alex's mind to make her believe she was Anna. Charlotte was planning on killing her but Edmund stopped Charlotte in the nick of time.

While being taken away by the police, Charlotte had a final revelation: She was not Alex or Anna's biological mother; they were the product of a cousin of the man Alex thought was her father. Charlotte had convinced the mother one of her twins had been stillborn, and then smuggled the child (Alex) out of the hospital, raising her as her own. Alex was devastated to learn her entire life had been a lie and she had a sister she never knew.

With Charlotte out of the way, Alex expected to settle down with Edmund, but within a few days Dimitri revealed himself to her. He had been kidnapped by Charlotte's thugs and had fought with all his strength to keep Alex safe and bring her "mother" to justice. Alex was overjoyed to see him again and they had sex immediately. Although Alex still felt strong emotions for Edmund, she felt a stronger bond with Dimitri and could not leave her husband's side again. Edmund grew increasingly irrational and both Dimitri and Alex were frightened by his behavior. In late 2000, she vanished while on board the Fidelity yacht. Dimitri was convinced Edmund was behind the kidnapping, but after a few months, he received a phone call. Alex was safe, but hidden away in secluded Canadian woods. She asked Dimitri not to track her down, but he and Edmund ignored her wishes. They burst into a cabin where they found an old man taking care of her. They were blindsided when Alex walked into the room and said the seriously ill woman was her twin sister, Anna.

The old man, Bart, had been taking care of Anna for years, but her seizures and fever had grown worse and worse. He tracked Alex down that night on the Fidelity and asked her to help treat her sister. Alex had agreed to join him. Anna couldn't be taken to a hospital since Charlotte was still out to kill her, had left Dimitri behind. Unfortunately, Anna was beyond the point of anything but extensive hospital care saving her. Alex flew Anna and Bart to Pine Valley (Bart died a few weeks later) and placed her in a private PVH wing. They pretended Alex was seriously ill from fever and needed care, but one by one other doctors began to find out the truth. With their help, Anna was treated and released. She hid out at Wildwind as she tried to get back her strength and her lost memories. This placed the entire family in danger, but Edmund and Dimitri insisted Anna stay put. A mute young man showed up soon after Anna arrived at Wildwind. He had been instructed to kill her but couldn't go through with his job. He was another victim of Charlotte's brainwashing and as Alex quickly found out, she and Anna's half-brother. Despite Dimitri's refusal to believe his story, Alex accepted the boy (Gabriel) and tried to make him feel welcome. After a lifetime of loneliness, she was delighted to have two new siblings.

In the midst of this turmoil, Dimitri and Edmund's niece, Gillian, whom Alex was very close to, had agreed to make a documentary about her life. The documentarian, a woman named Ilene, was eager to see the plans of Wildwind. Her eagerness was due to her actually being Charlotte's hitwoman! Alex and everyone else found this out moments too late, as Ilene saw a woman from the back, mistook her for Anna, and shot her at close range. The woman was not Anna, but Gillian. Gillian died from her wounds, and even though Ilene was arrested, gave Charlotte up, and was deported to face serious charges, Alex was overwhelmed with remorse. Erica Kane went out of her way to declare Alex a "curse on the entire family." Alex knew some other family members agreed and were just too polite to say so. Anna, however, vigorously defended her sister, putting Erica in her place over it on several occasions. Guilt-ridden about the constant danger and death she'd carried with her since her arrival at Wildwind, and perhaps still unsure of her feelings for Edmund, Alex left with Dimitri in 2001 to track down a family mystery and eventually settle down in Hungary.

It is revealed in June 2013 Alex and Dimitri got a divorce, but the date of the divorce is not revealed.

In 2017, Alex assumes the identity of Anna for one-month; during this time, she seduces Valentin Cassadine to steal the Chimera Project. When she is caught by Anna and the WSB, she contacts Valentin to help her with her legal issues and, in return, would help him with his own legal issues. Alex returns to Port Charles in 2019, at the request of Anna, following Anna's own inquiry about her memories and Alex's one-time involvement with Dr. Arthur Cabot. Anna asked Alex what memory she had planted in her by Dr. Cabot, but Alex lied before being sent to prison. She later escaped. Robert Scorpio, Anna's ex-husband, then suggests that Anna's son with Cesar Faison, Peter August, could actually be Alex's son.

In 2020, Alex returns just as Anna gets confirmation that Peter is Alex's son and the memory was implanted into Anna. She knocks out Anna and ties her up, then takes her place. However, Valentin figures out "Anna" is really Alex and Alex holds him captive too. Robert rescues Anna and Valentin, but Alex escapes by shooting Hamilton Finn, Anna's fiancé and kidnapping a pregnant Maxie Jones, Peter's fiancée. Anna tracks Alex and Maxie down to the Haunted Star, and shoots Alex. Before Anna can get help, Alex throws herself overboard and is presumed dead.

In 2021, a video Alex left for Peter is played at the double wedding ceremony of Peter and Maxie, and Anna and Finn, where she reveals that she is Peter's biological mother, not Anna.
