= Erica Kane =

- All My Children character
- Portrayed by: Susan Lucci
- Duration: 1970–2011
- First appearance: January 16, 1970
- Last appearance: September 23, 2011
- Created by: Agnes Nixon
- Introduced by: Bud Kloss and Agnes Nixon
In-universe information
- Other names: Sheila; Desiree Dubois; Erica Martin; Erica Brent; Erica Cudahy; Erica Chandler; Erica Roy; Erica Montgomery; Erica Marick
- Occupation: Businesswoman; Television personality; Disco owner; Model; Author
- Family: Kane
- Parents: Eric Kane; Mona Kane Tyler
- Half-brothers: Mark Dalton
- Half-sisters: Silver Kane
- Spouse: Jeff Martin (1970–1974); Phillip Brent (1975–1976); Tom Cudahy (1978–1981); Adam Chandler (1984–1993) (Note: Adam and Erica were first married in 1984. When the couple "divorced" in 1985, it was Stuart who initiated the divorce, making it invalid. Adam and Erica reunited and renewed their vows in 1991, and officially divorced in 1993.); Mike Roy (1985); Travis Montgomery (1988–1989, 1990–1991); Dimitri Marick (1993–1994, 1994–1996); Jackson Montgomery (2005–2007)
- Children: Kendall Hart; Josh Madden; Bianca Montgomery
- Grandchildren: Spike Lavery; Ian Slater; Miranda Montgomery; Gabrielle Montgomery
- Nieces: Julie Rand Chandler (half)

Erica Kane is a fictional character from the American ABC Daytime soap opera All My Children. The character was portrayed by actress Susan Lucci from her debut on January 16, 1970, until the last broadcast television episode on September 23, 2011. Lucci was expected to guest star on Prospect Park's continuation of All My Children in 2013, but the appearance never came to fruition due to the show's second cancellation.

Erica is considered to be the most popular character in American soap opera history. TV Guide calls her "unequivocally the most famous soap opera character in the history of daytime TV," and included her in their 2013 list of The 60 Nastiest Villains of All Time.

== Creation ==
=== Background ===
Agnes Nixon created Erica Kane in the 1960s as part of the story bible for All My Children, a light-hearted soap opera focusing on social issues and young love. Nixon unsuccessfully attempted to sell the series to NBC, then to CBS, and once again to NBC through Procter & Gamble. With Procter & Gamble unable to make room for the new series in its line up, she put All My Children on hold. Nixon became head writer of Another World where she used the model of the Erica character to create a brand new character: Rachel Davis. Nixon said Rachel was Erica's "precursor to the public." She detailed Rachel's goals as less "stratospheric" in nature since her primary motivation involved marrying Dr. Russ Mathews or a man with money while Erica wanted love, independence, and fame. "What Erica and Rachel have in common is they thought if they could get their dream, they'd be satisfied," Nixon said. "But that dream has been elusive."

After the success of One Life to Live, a series Nixon created in 1968, ABC asked her to create another soap opera for them. She used the story bible for All My Children to create the new program. The Erica character officially debuted in 1970 once All My Children made it onto the air.

=== Casting ===
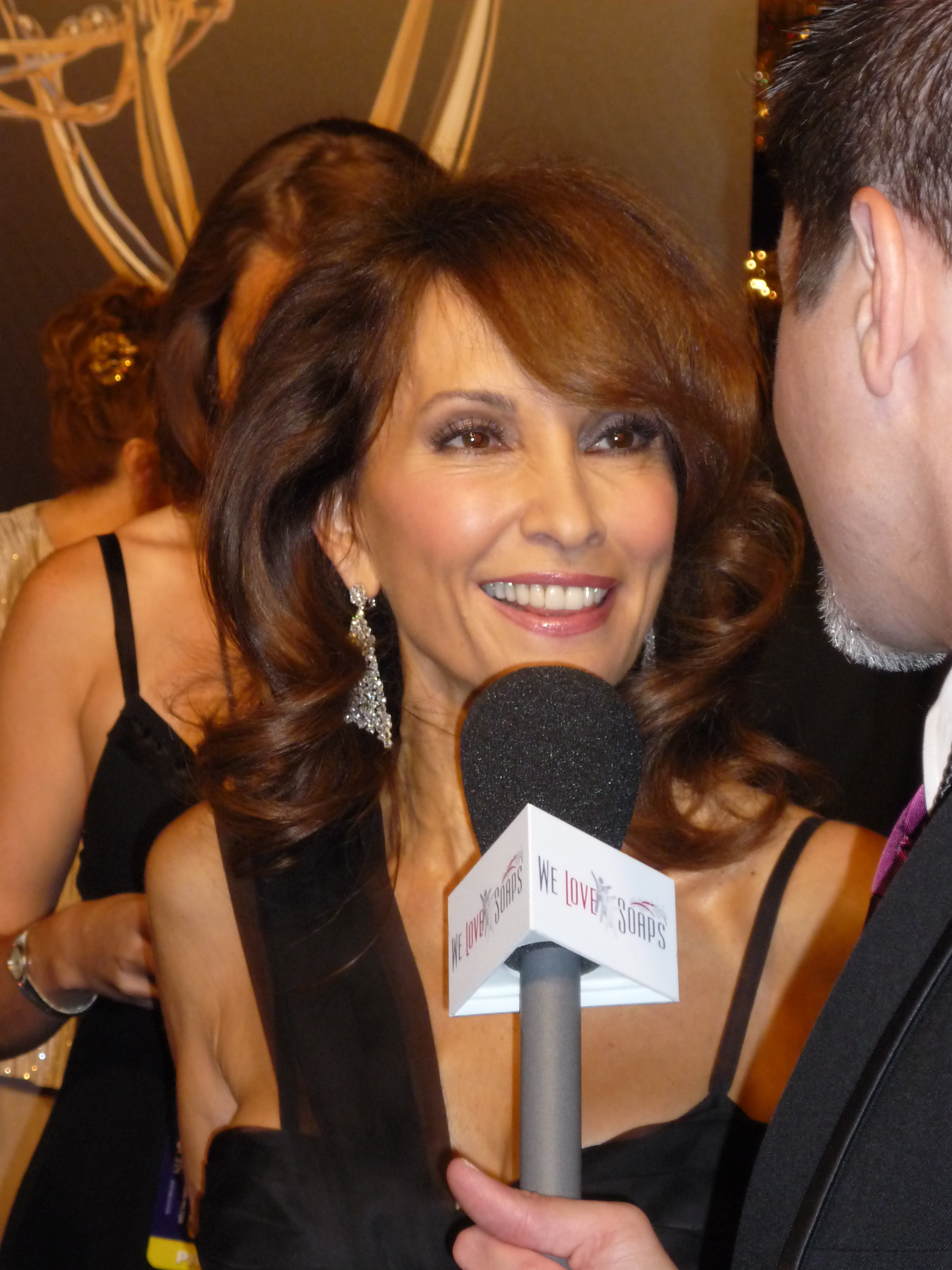
Susan Lucci portrayed Erica Kane from 1970 until the show's cancellation in 2011.

At the time, soap operas featured mostly older casts. To add a contemporary feel to the show, Nixon focused on younger characters, while also mixing in older ones so as not to lose traditional viewers. The youths on All My Children were Tara Martin (Karen Lynn Gorney), Phillip Brent (Richard Hatch), Chuck Tyler (Jack Stauffer), and Erica Kane (Susan Lucci). For those parts, the show wanted to cast unknown actors.

In 1969, Susan Lucci responded to a casting call for All My Children. She initially auditioned for the role of Tara Martin. The "character that we were all interested in was not Erica, but Tara," said Doris Quinlan, the show's former executive producer. "She was the sweet young ingenue — the one with all the problems that everyone was supposed to care about... I certainly couldn't cast [Lucci] as a young, innocent, sweet little Irish girl. That's not what comes out. She's much more sophisticated – at least she gives that appearance. She was perfect to play Erica." After a meeting with a casting director, they promised to call her back in six months. One of hundreds of people they called back in, Lucci progressed on from each reading of the part until she received the role. "I saw the audition tapes, and she just stood out," said Agnes Nixon. "There was never a question, ever."

Before being cast as Erica Kane, Lucci did not have much success in her acting career. A casting director discouraged her from pursuing roles on television because her hair, skin, and eyes were too dark. Though Lucci's olive complexion held her back from other acting opportunities, it worked in her favor while up for the role of Erica. "Agnes Nixon, the show's creator, really wanted somebody dark to play this part. She has always been ahead of her time," Lucci said. Lucci debuted in episode 10 of the series. In portraying Erica, the actress drew on the "self-centered" and "haughty" traits she recognized in herself while in college. Lucci said, "I love playing her. I enjoyed playing her when she was a 15-year-old high school girl, the naughty girl in town, and I enjoy playing her now, when she's still the naughty girl, but she's broadened her area of operation to include the entire world."

=== Archetypes ===
Over the years, Erica developed into different character archetypes. Soap operas once featured only one-dimensional characters who were either good or bad. By the 1970s, characters were written with more depth, fitting into archetypes consisting of the young-and-vulnerable romantic heroine, the old-fashioned villain, the rival, the suffering antagonist, Mr. Right, the former playboy, the meddlesome and villainous mother/grandmother, the benevolent mother/grandmother, and the career woman. Erica was established as the rival to Tara Martin's young-and-vulnerable romantic heroine. As the rival, Erica was written as money and status-conscious as well as sexually aggressive. Erica was generally positioned as the antagonist keeping true love pairings, such as Tara and Phillip Brent, apart.

By the late 1970s, a different set of character types were established, including the chic suburbanite, the subtle single, the traditional family person, the successful professional, and the elegant socialite. Erica was in the chic suburbanite category which comprised "flashy," achievement-oriented characters with little interest in family and friends. Like others in this category, Erica was written as "flamboyant, frivolous and carefree, with little commitment other than [her] own selfish enjoyment of life."

Overall, Erica is the embodiment of "the bitch goddess," a soap opera archetype that "transformed and defined" the soap opera genre. Irna Phillips, Nixon, and William J. Bell created the archetype in the 1960s and it became one of their defining legacies. The archetype is an assertive Cinderella who goes after material things. This was a change from the heroines of the radio soap operas who waited to be rescued by men. Erica started out as "a conniving teenage vixen" and transformed into "the femme fatale incarnate." The characters in this category are outrageous, exaggerated, financially disadvantaged and determined to change that. Other characters in this archetype are Lisa Grimaldi (As the World Turns), Rachel Davis (Another World) and Belle Clemons (The Secret Storm).

== Development ==
=== Characteristics ===
"You gotta go where the action is, Mona. Isn't that right, Erica?"

When there is any. I mean, Pine Valley isn't exactly the corner of Hollywood and Vine.

— Susan Lucci as Erica Kane, responding to Larry Keith's character Nick Davis, Episode 10, airdate January 16, 1970

Erica is a headstrong and selfish 15-year-old when All My Children begun in 1970. Although Nixon designed her as one of the bad characters, she was not intended to come off as evil or menacing. Since Nixon created All My Children as a "light hearted" soap opera, the series' villains, Erica included, came across as more fun and funny, than wicked. Over time, Erica evolved into a "heroine-vixen" who still did bad things, but was also a character the audience rooted for. Former associate producer Felicia Minei Behr said, "The Erica that [Lucci] started with, was a kid who was one-dimensional, who was the rotten seed, and she turned her into a very fascinating character- the character that everybody loves to hate." Characterized as the "naughty girl in town" from the start, her motivations stem from her relationship with her father. Her abandonment by him led her to be written as sexually aggressive with men. She needs to receive love from men to prove she is not unlovable.

One of Erica's defining features is her extreme self-centered point of view. Erica is described as "imaginative, adventurous, and brilliant", yet writers detailed her as appearing "scarcely rational enough to cope with adulthood." Despite this, the character represents independence and power. "I think of Erica as a go-getter," Lucci said, "someone who's impatient to have a terrific life and have it yesterday. I think a lot of people can identify with that." She always controls her business whether involved with a man or not. Some of the jobs she has been given during her storylines include a high fashion model, a cosmetics tycoon, and a magazine publisher.

When Charles Pratt, Jr. took over as head writer of All My Children in 2008, one of his goals for improving the series involved making Erica the focus of the show again. "[A]bove all, the show is, and should always revolve around, Erica," he said in an interview with Soap Opera Digest. "I can see the temptation to split her off and put her in jail and put her on the run. We did it on Ugly Betty! But to me, she is the Scarlett O'Hara of this show and she must always be that, be the center and the heart of the show. Challenging that character that way, making her the powerful woman she should be, is important."

=== Family ===
When All My Children debuts, the Kane family consists of Erica, her mother, Mona (Frances Heflin), and her absent father, film director Eric Kane (Albert Stratton). Mona spoils Erica to fill the void Eric left behind. Despite this, the writers scripted the relationship between Mona and Erica as tumultuous, with Mona disapproving of Erica's behavior and Erica blaming Mona for her father's desertion. The relationship is later developed into a strong bond. The writers layered their interactions with "raw edges" and humor. "Erica idealized her father. Heflin said. Whenever Eric disappoints Erica, she blames her mother. "Then, of course, would come the moment of breakdown when she would cry on [Mona's] shoulder," Helfin said. "So it's more or less human. Really, more human and less saccharine than most of the mother/children relationships on soaps. It has an awful lot of bit in it." After Mona's death in 1994, Erica continues to put Eric on a pedestal, refusing to acknowledge his flaws.

From the start of the series, the lack of a relationship with her father serves as motivation for Erica's actions. She is an example of the Nixon staple of the "lost daddy's girl." Eric abandons her and her mother before the start of the show, when Erica is nine years old. As a result, she develops a severe abandonment complex. Since Eric leaves his family for a successful career in Hollywood, Erica also longs for a life of fame and a successful man. This motivation is maintained in the character decades into the series. "Susan added a lot of Erica's background," Behr said. "Rather than playing it as if Erica's just a rotten character, she added the pathos of this child who was deserted by her father. Every time she did a scene about how 'My father loves me. I know that he loves me and nobody is going to tell me differently,' she colored it with the knowledge that she had really been deserted. It worked so well that the writers reached the point where they said we have to play this out." In 1989, Eric makes his first appearance as Erica goes in search of him and finds him working as a clown at a circus. She attempts to help him out of his current circumstances, but he ends up betraying her and leaving Pine Valley.

The 1993 arrival of Kendall Hart (Sarah Michelle Gellar) prompted the reveal that, prior to the series' debut, Erica had been raped at age 14 by Eric's friend, film star Richard Fields. Eric had allowed Richard, who had a "crush" on Erica, to be alone with her and had done nothing to prevent the rape from occurring. A revisitation of the event during Erica's 2004 alcohol intervention storyline introduced the fact Eric had actually offered up Erica for sex with Richard to convince the actor to star in one of Eric's films. Erica represses all memory of the rape until 16-year-old Kendall, a child conceived by it and revealed to be Erica's first born daughter she gave up for adoption to the Harts, appears in 1993. Viewer reaction to the discrepancy created by Erica's having a 16-year-old daughter conceived in a 24-year-old rape prompted the series to immediately adjust Kendall's age to 23. The mother-daughter relationship between Erica and Kendall was designed as antagonistic and complex, with Kendall, unaware of the rape, seeking revenge against Erica in feeling she "abandoned" her as an infant, while wanting her mother's approval. Kendall's attempted seduction of Erica's love interest, Dimitri Marick, creates conflict between him and Erica, and Kendall also brings Richard Fields to town to torment her mother. Kendall later makes peace with her mother and leaves town in 1995. She returns in 2002, portrayed by a new actress, Alicia Minshew, as Kendall's birth year was revised to 1976. The later story between Erica and Kendall displayed each character's point of view as they both deal with the ramifications of how Kendall's conception traumatized them, which Lucci praised. A reconciliation later occurs for the characters wherein they bond as mother and daughter.

In a topical 1971 storyline, Erica aborts the baby she conceives with her first husband, Jeff Martin (Charles Frank). This is the first legal abortion aired on American television prior to the landmark Supreme Court Roe v. Wade ruling as Erica sought an abortion in the state of New York which had legalized the procedure in July 1970. Erica was chosen for this storyline as a way to prevent controversy. Since she was a bad girl and not one of the heroines, her choice would not be viewed as something the show supported. The show also protected themselves from controversy by writing Erica as mentally blocking out the abortion and, for a time, believing she miscarried. Viewers loved the story and Erica became a symbol of free choice. Erica develops a potentially fatal infection after having the abortion. "Erica's abortion was simply because she didn't want to have a child, and I think if you do that now, you would perhaps hurt your character," said former All My Children head writer Megan McTavish. McTavish later rewrote the story so the doctor, Greg Madden (Ian Buchanan), transplants the aborted fetus into his infertile wife. They raise the child, Josh Madden (Colin Egglesfield), as their son without Erica's knowledge. Inkling Magazine pointed out how unrealistic this storyline was because "the techniques by which abortion is performed don't exactly lend themselves to excising an embryo viable enough to survive in another woman's womb." The magazine said more likelihood existed in the possibility that Madden harvested Erica's eggs during the procedure, though an invasive surgery like that going unnoticed appeared unlikely as well. Egglesfield gained different information on the probability of the story. In an interview with Soap Opera Digest, he said, "Actually, my father is an obstetrician/gynecologist and my brother is a doctor, as is one of my best friends, and their collective opinion is that this is possible; it is possible to take a fetus out of one woman and place it into the womb of another woman, but it's only possible within the first week of pregnancy, before the fetus actually starts attaching itself to the uterine lining." In the storyline, Greg harbors an obsession with Erica, which motivates him to choose her for the transplant in the first place. Greg and Josh make their first appearances in 2005. Greg's wife recently died and he moves to Pine Valley for closer proximity to Erica under the guise of opening a clinic. Josh follows him soon afterward and, not knowing Erica is his mother, attempts to destroy Erica in order to steal her fame for himself. Erica discovers the truth and is eventually able to form a relationship with him. In 2009, All My Children let Egglesfield go and killed off Josh. Zach Slater (Thorsten Kaye) shoots him and Erica is then forced to decide whether or not to donate Josh's heart to a seriously ill Kendall. "The first thought that came to my mind when I was told the storyline and read the script was Sophie's Choice," said Lucci. Erica reluctantly agrees to the transplant. Lucci said she believed this decision would "haunt" Erica because, if Kendall's life was not in the balance, she would have put more effort into saving Josh.

Erica's youngest child, Bianca Montgomery, enters the series in 1988. At that time, Bianca is Erica's first and only child since the Kendall and Josh characters were not created yet. In the storyline, Erica becomes pregnant with Travis Montgomery's child and develops toxemia. The story was written to inform and educate the audience on the details of the condition. Inkling Magazine looked into the plausibility of her developing toxemia and found it believable. The magazine said, "[W]omen who were born small for their gestational age have a higher risk of developing pre-eclampsia during their own pregnancies. The petite form of [Susan Lucci as Erica] seems to fit that description well. Also, given the character's storyline, which included shooting her sister's mother, Goldie, and the attraction she feels for Jack, her husband's brother, she could have had high blood pressure from stress. That hypertension increases the risk of toxemia." Erica overcomes the medical difficulties and gives birth to Bianca. As she grows up, Erica sees her through Reye syndrome and anorexia nervosa. In 2000, All My Children cast Eden Riegel in the role of a teenage Bianca. The character comes out as a lesbian to her mother. Erica has trouble accepting the revelation, but eventually does. This storyline was inspired by the real life coming out story of Chaz Bono, and the initial reaction by his famous mother Cher.

Erica's other relatives include half-siblings Mark Dalton (Mark LaMura) and Silver Kane (Mary LeSeene). In 1977, Mark and Erica begin a romance, which leads Mona to reveal Mark had also been fathered by Eric Kane, who had engaged in an affair with Mark's mother, Maureen Dalton Tiller, Eric's secretary. In 1982, while working in New York City as a model, Erica discovers a half-sister named Silver. Unlike Mark, Silver is the product of a secret marriage between Eric and a woman named Goldie. Silver secretly plots against Erica while pretending to form a bond with her. Silver is later exposed as an impostor named Connie, but the real Silver shows up soon after, only to be killed.

=== Marriages and relationships ===
"Erica truly believes when she gets married that it's going to last. She's one of those people—when she says those vows, she means them. She's really very old-fashioned in that she gets married instead of just saying 'I've been married enough, I'm going to just live with someone.' She's still searching for that home with mommy and daddy and children. The home she didn't have."

— Megan McTavish, Soap Opera Weekly

The character has been married to multiple men, some more than once. Seven of her marriages to six different men have been valid, while four of her other marriages are invalid. Generally, the number of times Erica has been married is named as ten, though the total of her valid and invalid marriages, plus her 1991 vow renewal with Adam Chandler, would come up to eleven. Along with the marriages, the character is also given a number of other love interests. The motivation behind the multiple romances stems from the character's need to fill the void her father left when he abandoned her.

As the series begins, Erica's romantic role is as the rival keeping the "true love" pairings apart. The first story she is used this way in is the teenage love quadrangle between Erica, Phillip Brent, Tara Martin, and Chuck Tyler. In that story, Erica is used as one of the devices separating Tara and Phil. She breaks them up in 1970, but does not get him for herself until years later. Other couples she is used as a roadblock for are Jeff Martin and Mary Kennicott, Linc Tyler and Kitty Shae, and Chuck Tyler and Donna Beck.

Erica's first two marriages, first to Dr. Jeff Martin in December 1970 and then to Phil Brent in 1975, end because both men want her as a housewife instead of a career woman. Also, Erica is more interested in marrying them to spite Tara. Lucci described Jeff as a "trophy" and gaining Phil as "a matter of pride for Erica." The marriage to Jeff ends when she leaves him for her modeling manager, Jason Maxwell, who Mona later kills in self-defense. Erica and Phil marry to give the baby they conceive a name. In the 1970s, pregnancy on a soap opera was romanticized so it was more influenced by the emotions and actions of the characters than by modern medicine. Since Phil and Erica do not conceive their baby for love, they are "rewarded" with a miscarriage, which was typical of loveless unions in that time. Phil wants a divorce after their baby's stillbirth. Though her interest turns to pursuing richer men like Linc Tyler, she refuses to let him go because she does not want Tara to have him. Erica agrees to divorce Phil after his father, Nick Davis, offers her a job as a hostess at his restaurant, the Chateau, in exchange for letting his son go. Erica and Nick develop a romance. The relationship displays antagonistic yet loving qualities. It is the first time Erica meets her match in a man. Erica sees Nick as both a father figure and a lover. Though he loves her, he refuses to marry her, which infuriates Erica. She begins a romance with Tom Cudahay (Richard Shoberg) in the hopes of making Nick jealous. Even though it works, Nick fails to act on his jealousy and instead moves to Chicago. On Erica and Tom's wedding day she hopes he will come back to interrupt the ceremony, but he does not.

All My Children shot Tom and Erica's honeymoon on location in St. Croix, the location where Nixon wrote the bible for the series. This was the first daytime location shoot filmed outside of the United States. The location shoot involved activities never seen in daytime soap operas up to that point, such as snorkeling and horseback riding. They used the steady-cam technique, which was new at the time. The cameraman Nick Udack "could walk or jog along side us on the beach," Shoberg said. "The steady-cam had a gyroscope that would keep it from bouncing when you took steps". The stumbling blocks designed for Erica and Tom's marriage involve the same as her last two since Erica puts her modeling career ahead of starting a family with Tom. They divorce after he discovers that she uses birth control pills.

Erica becomes involved with Mike Roy (Nicholas Surovy and then Hugo Napier), the man writing her biography, Raising Kane. "He was Erica's first great love," Lucci said. "They were very different. He was very intellectual and she was not, and still he loved her for who she was." Mike and Erica fall in love and are kept apart by Adam Chandler (David Canary), the man producing a film adaptation of Raising Kane. Adam sends Mike away to Tibet to separate him and Erica. While Mike is away, Adam offers Erica the lead role in the movie if she marries him. She agrees and they marry in 1984, but Adam casts another actress in the role. After Mike returns, Adam tests Erica's feelings for him by faking his death. She responds to his supposed demise by marrying Mike. Adam reveals he is alive, making their marriage invalid, and forces Erica to choose between him and Mike. She chooses Mike. They plan to marry but before they can he is shot. On his deathbed, he and Erica exchange vows.

"Get away from me, you disgusting, disgusting beast! You may not do this! Do you understand me? YOU MAY NOT come near me! I am ERICA KANE! And you are a filthy beast!" (primal scream)

— Susan Lucci as Erica Kane, fighting off a grizzly bear on location in Canada, airdate September 4, 1985

Erica's next love interest is the Tibetan monk Jeremy Hunter (Jean Leclerc). The Jeremy Hunter character was created as a polar opposite of Erica, in part, because he swore a vow of celibacy which contrasted with her sexuality. He is described as "caring, creative, vulnerable, nurturing, patient, and tender." The maternal nature of the character was balanced by his physical and public power. Their relationship was written to reflect a form of protective dominance. Within the storyline, from the summer of 1985 to the summer of 1986 Jeremy rescues her from Adam, his father and Latin American terrorists, all of whom kidnap and attempt to sexually assault Erica. He also saves her from Natalie Marlow, who holds her at gun point. The relationship does not go both ways as they break up when Erica attempts to rescue him. In the story, Jeremy is convicted for a crime he did not commit, so Erica stages a wedding ceremony in prison as a way to break him out by escaping on a helicopter from the roof. Jeremy refuses to let her help him escape, ending their relationship. During the story where Jeremy rescued Erica from Adam, All My Children went on location to Canada to film the scenes. Later, the show again went on location, this time to New York's West Chester County's Wingdale hospital, which provided the setting for Erica's attempt to break Jeremy out of prison.

In 1987, Erica becomes involved with the politician Travis Montgomery (Larkin Malloy). Erica and Travis are portrayed as sexually equal and infused with elements of romance and fantasy. Erica becomes pregnant with his child, but does not tell him for fear that it will disrupt his political career. In 1988, when Travis finds out about the baby, they get married. She becomes attracted to his brother, Jackson Montgomery (Walt Willey), but does not act on the feeling until after she and Travis divorce. They have "a very hot romance" and fall in love, but Erica remarries Travis in 1990 at their daughter Bianca's insistence. Travis and Erica's second marriage is not a happy one. "I think after they got back together," said Lucci, "it was never the same again. There was always this rift. He became bitter and sort of cruel to Erica." Their second marriage ends after Travis catches her cheating on him with Jack. During the custody hearing over Bianca, Jack refuses to lie about their affair, resulting in Erica losing custody of her daughter.

In 1991, Adam reveals to Erica that they are still married. He blackmails her into staging another wedding ceremony and living with him as his wife. During this marriage, she meets and falls in love with Dimitri Marick (Michael Nader). She fights her feelings for him while he pursues her despite their marriages to other people. Adam eventually grants Erica a divorce, freeing her to be with Dimitri. Erica and Dimitri carry on a long relationship involving two failed marriages and a miscarriage. The pairing was imbued with fairytale elements that were reflected in the wardrobe designs for Erica's wedding dresses. Once Erica and Dimitri separate for a final time in 1997, Erica reunites with Jackson. They become engaged right before Mike Roy is revealed to be alive. Erica is torn between them. Though she chooses Jack, she and Mike engage in sex one last time before he leaves Pine Valley. Jack finds out and breaks things off with her.

In 1999, a car accident with David Hayward (Vincent Irizarry) leaves Erica's face disfigured. This storyline unintentionally mirrored a similar car accident Lucci was involved in, in 1966 which almost permanently scarred her face. Like Erica, she needed plastic surgery. In the storyline, Erica and David fall in love while he helps her through her recovery. The obstacles designed to come between them are her continued feelings for Dimitri and his inability to fully give himself to a woman because of what happened to his father when he loved his mother too much. They become engaged to be married but Erica calls it off. She next falls in love with Chris Stamp (Jack Scalia). "I really think that she found someone very special in Chris Stamp," Lucci said. "They are a pretty hot combination, and he seems strong and capable enough of being with her." In the story, after becoming engaged to Chris, Erica cheats on him with Jack and Chris is killed. She and Jack marry in 2005. They form a family unit including all of their combined children. The union does not last, as they grow apart and Erica cheats on him with Jeff Martin.

All My Children hired Mario Van Peebles in 2008 to portray Samuel Woods, Erica's new love interest. The writers based the story on Martha Stewart's insider trading scandal. Erica buys Chandler Enterprises stock based on privileged information Adam Chandler shares with her. U.S. Attorney, Sam Woods brings charges up against her. They develop an attraction while he prosecutes her and she goes to prison for the crime. The relationship goes no further than dating before Sam leaves Pine Valley to campaign for a seat on the Senate.

Charles Pratt, Jr. took over as head writer of All My Children in 2008. The next year, he decided to put Erica and Ryan Lavery (Cameron Mathison) together as a couple. News outlets labeled her a "cougar" since Erica is older than Ryan. Pratt defended the story and said what they have "isn't a relationship that's borne out of anything except true respect and a growing affection for each other as Erica becomes Ryan's pillar of support. [He] offers her an escape from what her life has become, which is digging her various daughters out of trouble." He described the couple as "a very odd but natural coming together of two people [who are] pushed apart by the attitudes of society."

On July 25, 2011, Erica stabs David after she escapes from the clutches of her look-alike Jane Campbell that posed as her. She is taken to Oak Haven and there she first sees Janet "from another Planet" Green Dillon, then Annie Lavery, then Marian Colby Chandler, and finally she sees Dixie Cooney Martin. On August 11, 2011, Jane takes the blame for stabbing David so Erica can remain free. During the last few episodes of the show Erica is offered a chance to write a movie about her book (much to the dismay of Jack who wants to marry her). This leads to a falling-out between the two at Stuart Chandler's welcome home party. As Jack leaves the party, Erica admits in front of everyone that she needs and loves Jack, to which he replies by bitterly telling her, Rhett Butler-style, that "frankly," he doesn't give a damn about what she needs. "This is not the ending I wanted," Erica says to Opal. "Oh, you've done it, now you'll never get it back," Opal tells her. "Just watch me," says Erica. As Erica goes after Jack, JR fires his pistol, ending the show. It is implied that the bullet has hit Erica as she is last to be shown before the screen blacks out.

In a conversation between Kate Howard and Todd Manning on General Hospital, Erica is mentioned as someone else Todd could have talked to about the job he was offering to Kate, implying she survived the final episode of All My Children. On the June 20, 2013 episode of the Prospect Park version of All My Children, Opal Cortlandt tells Dimitri Marick, one of Erica's ex-husbands that Erica was out of town last seen getting on an airplane to some exotic location without saying when she would be back.

In a 2018 episode of General Hospital Maxie Jones is seen on the phone arguing with someone over a bill, and later warns Nina Clay that Erica Kane might be calling her about Maxie's negotiations, suggesting Erica is still alive and working in the fashion industry at this point.

== Cultural impact ==
The Associated Press reported in 1986 that 60 students at California State University, Fullerton of a group of 100 could recognize Erica Kane but not historical figures such as Alexander Hamilton, Geoffrey Chaucer and Desmond Tutu when asked by English instructor Judith Remy Leder. In 2024, Charlie Mason from Soaps She Knows placed Erica at first place on his ranked list of Soaps' 40 Most Iconic Characters of All Time, writing, "Even if you'd never watched a soap a day in your life, you knew the name of the mercurial supermodel-turned-cosmetics mogul that Susan Lucci played from 1970–2011".

Susan Lucci hosted the sketch comedy show Saturday Night Live on October 6, 1990. In one sketch, Lucci played Kane as a contestant on the fictional game show "Game Breakers". She seduced fictional game show host Jack Morgan (portrayed by Phil Hartman), thus enabling her to soundly beat her opponent. Morgan came close to marrying Kane (in a ceremony presided over by Don Pardo), but the wedding was interrupted by real-life game show host (and "current husband") Gene Rayburn. The sketch ended with Kane being mauled by a panther owned by Siegfried and Roy (portrayed by Kevin Nealon and Dana Carvey).

The Erica Kane character provided inspiration for numerous songs, all of which were named after her. Alternative rock band Urge Overkill titled a song after the character on their album Saturation. The late R&B musical artist Aaliyah recorded a song about drug addiction called "Erica Kane", where the character's name was used as a metaphor for a cocaine. The song was released posthumously on the album I Care 4 U. The band B5 also recorded a song about Erica Kane titled "Erika Cain." The song talks about how they're in a relationship with a beautiful girl, but she is crazy. The group contacted All My Children's producers about doing a cameo on the show. They appeared in the April 25, 2008 episode as activists rallying for Erica's release from prison. During the appearance, the group performed "Erika Cain." They also taped a video for the song with Susan Lucci. Rapper Lil' Kim at times refers to herself as "the black Erica Kane." Rapper Speaker Knockerz last release before dying in 2014 was titled “Erica Kane”.

Mattel created two dolls based on Erica Kane as part of the company's Daytime Drama Collection. They released the first one in 1998. Mattel modeled that doll after the character's appearance during the Crystal Ball, an annual event in All My Children's storylines. After that doll met with success, they released the second in 1999 called the Champagne Lace Wedding Erica Kane Doll. This one was based on the character as she was during the 1993 wedding to Dimitri Marick.

Over the years, Susan Lucci became known for gaining Daytime Emmy Award nominations for her portrayal of Erica, but never winning. Almost every year from 1978 to 1998, Lucci received nominations for Outstanding Lead Actress in a Drama series and never won. Her negative reactions to the losses, including pounding her fist on the table and leaving one ceremony in tears, were mentioned in tabloids. Her losses also caused her fellow castmate Ruth Warrick to speak out to the press. In 1983, when Lucci lost to All My Children newcomer Dorothy Lyman (Opal), Warrick said, "It seemed impossible that Susan wouldn't win this year. We are all very puzzled, amazed, and disgruntled." She later added, "It was a slap in the face to Susan that Dorothy should walk off with it after being on the show such a short time. And of course her role was so outrageous and so, well, it was a caricature. That's not in any way to put down what Dorothy did, but it really was a supporting role rather than a leading role." The losing streak became a "long-running gag" in the entertainment community. Jay Leno on The Tonight Show used it as a joke as did Saturday Night Live. The author of The Emmy, Tom O'Neil, attributed the losses to the material she submitted for consideration. "In the episodes she sent in last year, she was crying 75 percent of the time," he said. "She drowned her chances in a tsunami of tears. Lucci eventually won the Daytime Emmy Award in 1999, receiving a two-minute standing ovation at the win and again after the show in the press room. A reporter in the press room questioned whether she would miss the attention she got for losing, to which Lucci responded, "Oh, not for a minute. Winning is definitely better." The entries Lucci submitted for the 1999 Daytime Emmy Awards involved scenes from Erica's storyline where she helps Bianca deal with her anorexia.
