= List of All My Children cast members =

This is a list of actors and actresses who have had roles on the soap opera All My Children. It aired from January 1970 to September 2011 and was revived for five months in 2013.

The longest serving cast member is Susan Lucci, who played the heroine Erica Kane from January 1970 to the original finale in September 2011.

== Cast ==
Actor	Character	Duration			
Anthony Addabbo	Dimitri Marick	2001			
Mary Kay Adams	Mrs Lacey	2003			
Nancy Addison	Marissa Rampal	1989			
Mackenzie Aladjem	Miranda Montgomery	2010–11			
Micah Alberti	Jamie Martin	2002–03			
Grant Aleksander	Alec McIntyre	1993–95			
Kevin Alexander	JR Chandler	1992–96			
Mary Alice	Ellie Grant Hubbard	1980			
Brittany Allen	Marissa Tasker	2009–10			
Laura Allen	Laura Kirk English	2000–02			
Philip Amelio	Scott Chandler	1987–91			
Melody Anderson	Natalie Marlowe	1992–93			
Melody Anderson	Janet Dillon	1993			
Terrell Anthony	Tad Martin	1990			
Matthew Anton	Tad Martin	1973–77			
Tom Archdeacon	Aidan Devane	2004			
Elizabeth Ashley	Madge Sinclair	1996			
Paul Avery	Hughie	1981-93			
Jamal Azizi	Jamie Martin	1993–94			
Jamil Azizi	Jamie Martin	1993–94			
Amanda Baker	Babe Carey	2007–09			
Kaye Ballard	Mrs Remo	1970			
Joseph Barbara	Paolo Caselli	2000			
Julia Barr	Brooke English	1976–2006, 2010–11, 2013			
Bernard Barrow	Louie Slavinsky	1991–92			
Patricia Barry	Peg English	1981–2005			
Mischa Barton	Lily Montgomery	1995			
Jennifer Bassey	Marian Chandler	1983–89, 1995–2009, 2011			
Kathy Bates	Belle Bodelle	1984			
Charlotte Baughman	JR Chandler	1989–92			
Margaret Baughman	JR Chandler	1989–92			
Amanda Bearse	Amanda Cousins	1981–84			
Noelle Beck	Trisha Alden	1991–92			
Maurice Benard	Nico Kelly	1987–90			
Nick Benedict	Phillip Brent	1973–78			
Jonathan Bennett	JR Chandler	2001–02			
Peter Bergman	Cliff Warner	1979–89			
Tate Berney	AJ Chandler	2010–11			
Jack Betts	Lars Bogard	1983			
Olivia Birkelund	Arlene Vaughan	1995, 2000–02			
Ryan Bittle	Logan	2010			
Ryan Bittle	JR Chandler	2013			
Judon Blake Foster	Frankie Hubbard	1984			
Pamela Blair	Maida Andrews	1985			
Pamela Blair	Mrs Goodman	1986, 1992			
Teresa Blake	Gloria Marsh	1991–98			
Susan Blanchard	Mary Kennicott	1971–75			
Mary Lynn Blanks	Tara Martin	1979–80			
Hunt Block	Guy Donohue	2000			
Crystal Bock	Lysistrata Schwartz	2002–03			
Vasili Bogazianos	Benny Sago	1980–90, 2005			
BethAnn Bonner	Kat	2009			
Roscoe Born	Jim Thomasen	1997			
Philip Bosco	Lyle Wedgewood	2000			
Chadwick Boseman	Reggie Montgomery	2003			
Michael Brainard	Jake Martin	1988–91, 1994–95			
Jeff Branson	Jonathan Lavery	2004–07			
Tamara Braun	Reese Williams	2008–09			
Stephanie Braxton	Tara Martin	1974–76			
Jordana Brewster	Anita Santos	1995			
Emerson Brooks	Ben	2011			
Randy Brooks	Hayes Grady	1996			
Charles Brown	Russ Anderson	1979–80			
Kimberlin Brown	Judge Mariam	2010			
Justin Bruening	Jamie Martin	2003–07, 2011			
Chris Bruno	Michael Delaney	1995–97			
Rebecca Budig	Greenlee Smythe	1999–2005, 2008–11			
Trent Bushey	David Rampal	1988–91			
Warren Burton	Eddie Dorrance	1978–79			
Mariah Buzolin	Maya Mercado	2011			
Claire Byrne	Amelia Cambias	2007–11			
Antoinette Byron	Skye Chandler	1986–87			
Kurt Caceres	Mateo Santos	2002			
John Callahan	Edmund Grey	1992–2005			
Kay Campbell	Kate Martin	1970–85			
David Canary	Adam Chandler	1983–2011, 2013			
David Canary	Stuart Chandler	1984–2009, 2011			
Stephen J. Cannell	Himself	1985			
Jeffrey Carlson	Zoe Luper	2006–07			
John Carter	Woodruff Greenlee	1998			
Maxwell Caulfield	Pierce Riley	1996–97			
Lacey Chabert	Bianca Montgomery	1992–93			
Lee Chamberlin	Pat Baxter	1982–90			
Crystal Chappell	Janie	1989			
Ambyr Childers	Colby Chandler	2006–08			
Robin Christopher	Skye Chandler Quartermaine	1987–91, 2000			
Natalia Cigliuti	Anita Santos	2004–06			
Charles Cioffi	Lionel Glynn	1992-93			
Keith Hamilton Cobb	Noah Keefer	1994–96			
Bradley Cole	Jordan Roberts	2003			
Jessica Collins	Dinah Lee Mayberry	1992			
Kate Collins	Natalie Marlowe	1985–92, 1997–98, 2001			
Kate Collins	Janet Dillon	1991–92, 2005–07, 2010–11			
Míriam Colón	Lydia Flores	1995			
Forrest Compton	John	1991			
Mark Consuelos	Mateo Santos	1995–2002, 2010			
Sara Contreras	Leticia Carmen Castillo	2013			
Linda Cook	Lucy Voight	1985–86			
Daniel Cosgrove	Scott Chandler	1996–98, 2010–11			
Nicolas Coster	Steve Andrews	1988			
Daniel Covin	Hunter Morrison	2013			
Matthew Cowles	Billy Clyde Tuggle	1977–80, 1984, 1989–90, 2013			
Brock Cuchna	Paul Cramer	2003–04			
Yaya DaCosta	Cassandra Foster	2008			
Alexandra Daddario	Laurie Lewis	2002–03			
Arlene Dahl	Lady Lucille	1995			
Linda Dano	Felicia Gallant	1983–1999			
Raúl Dávila	Hector Santos	1994–96			
Mark Dawson	Ted Brent	1970			
Johanna Day	Marilyn Stafford	2002–03			
Gloria DeHaven	Emma Mallory	1983			
Alana de la Garza	Rosa Santos	2001			
Kim Delaney	Jenny Gardner Nelson	1981–84, 1994			
Robb Derringer	District Attorney	2010			
William deVry	Michael Cambias	2003–04, 2006			
Kathleen Dezina	Marestella "Estelle" LaTour	1977–82			
Dena Dietrich	Wilma Marlowe	1994			
Colleen Dion	Leslie Coulson	1999–2001			
Mark Dobies	Daniel Colson	2005			
Josh Duhamel	Leo du Pres	1999–2003, 2011			
John E. Dunn	Tad Martin	1978–81			
Marj Dusay	Vanessa Bennett	1998–2002			
Alan Dysert	Sean Cudahy	1980-90	Bobbie Eakes	Krystal Carey	2003–2011
Candice Earley	Donna Beck Tyler	1976–92			
Louis Edmonds	Langley Wallingford	1979–95			
Melissa Claire Egan	Annie Lavery	2006–11			
Colin Egglesfield	Josh Madden	2005–09			
Beth Ehlers	Taylor Thompson	2008–09			
Haley Evans	Miranda Montgomery	2005–09			
Jessica Leigh Falborn	Bianca Montgomery	1988–90			
Jonathan Farwell	Judge Martel	1985			
Dylan Fergus	Tim Dillon	2002			
Mary Fickett	Ruth Martin	1970–96, 1998–2000			
Jim Fitzpatrick	Pierce Riley	1995–96			
Connie Fletcher	Erin Lavery	2005–06			
Ann Flood	Bitsy Davidson	1988–90			
David Forsyth	Jim Thomasen	1997–98			
Frances Foster	Aunt Bess	1980–81			
Kimberly Foster	Liz Sloane	1994–95			
Clement von Franckenstein	Count Guy du Pres	2001–02			
Genie Francis	Ceara Connor	1990–92			
Nancy Frangione	Tara Martin	1977–79, 1985			
Charles Frank	Jeff Martin	1970–75, 1988, 1995			
Hugh Franklin	Charles Tyler	1970–83			
Melissa Fumero	Adriana Cramer	2005			
Gina Gallagher	Bianca Montgomery	1993–97			
Helen Gallagher	Nurse Harris	1995			
Paula Garcés	Lea Marquez	2013			
Trent Garrett	Asher Pike	2010–11			
Priscilla Garita	Anita Santos	1994			
Brian Gaskill	Bobby Warner	1995–97			
Stephanie Gatschet	Madison North	2009–11			
Dan Gauthier	Kevin Buchanan	2004–05			
Rebecca Gayheart	Hannah Mayberry	1992			
Bob Gaynor	Mitch Morrison	2013			
Sarah Michelle Gellar	Kendall Hart	1993–95			
Sarah Michelle Gellar	Patient	2011			
Robert Gentry	Ross Chandler	1983–89			
Carrie Genzel	Skye Chandler	1996–97			
Zen Gesner	Braden Lavery	1998–99			
Luca Gianquinto	Oliver Castillo	2013			
Kari Gibson	Dixie Cooney	1988			
Kelli Giddish	Di Henry	2005–07			
Paul Gleason	David Thornton	1976–78			
Sarah Glendening	Marissa Tasker	2010–11			
Ricky Paull Goldin	Jake Martin	2008–11			
Karen Lynn Gorney	Tara Martin	1970–74, 1976–77, 1995			
Desiree Gould	Wedding Party Guest	1983			
Micki Grant	Mrs Remington	2008			
Bruce Gray	Wyatt Coles	1975			
Brian Lane Green	Brian Bodine	1993–94			
Nick Gregory	Jeff Cohen	1996			
William Griffis	Harlan Tucker	1978			
Ronald Guttman	Alexander Cambias Sr.	2003–09			
Stacy Haiduk	Hannah Nichols	2007–08			
Alice Haining	Liza Colby	1984–85			
Harriet Hall	Brooke English	1981–82			
Natalie Hall	Colby Chandler	2009–11			
Winsor Harmon	Del Henry	1994–95			
Elisabeth Harnois	Sarah Livingston	2000–01			
Kate Harrington	Kate Martin	1970			
Cynthia Harris	Patricia Hale	1994			
Todd Harrison	Jamie Martin	2001–02			
Darby Jo Hart	Jenny Martin	2010–11			
Lindsay Hartley	Cara Castillo	2010–11, 2013			
Martin Harvey	Uri Koslov	2013			
Richard Hatch	Philip Brent Sr.	1970–72			
Alexa Havins	Babe Carey	2003–07, 2011			
Shari Headley	Mimi Reed	1991–95, 2005			
Frances Heflin	Mona Kane Tyler	1970–94			
Amelia Heinle	Mia Saunders	2001–04			
Jo Henderson	Wilma Marlowe	1985–88			
Elizabeth Hendrickson	Frankie Stone	2001			
Elizabeth Hendrickson	Maggie Stone	2002–05, 2007			
Leslie Hendrix	Hannah Lampert	2004			
Eileen Herlie	Myrtle Lum Fargate	1976–2008			
Robert Hogan	Dr Bell	1992			
Lauren Holly	Julie Chandler	1986–89			
Janet Hubert	Alice Dawson	1999			
Season Hubley	Angelique Voynitzheva	1991–92			
Sara Hugh	Tina Harding	1999–2001			
Finola Hughes	Alex Marick	1999–2001			
Finola Hughes	Anna Devane	2001–03			
Cheryl Hulteen	Winifred	1991–2007, 2011, 2013			
Sarah Hyland	Karen	2000			
Earle Hyman	Mr. Patterson	1995			
Vincent Irizarry	David Hayward	1997–2006, 2008–11, 2013			
Terri Ivens	Simone Torres	2001–07			
Andrew Jackson	Stephen Hamill	1991–93			
Clifton James	Red Kilgren	1996			
Francesca James	Kitty Shea Tyler	1973–78			
Francesca James	Kelly Cole Tyler	1978–81, 1983–84, 1986, 1995, 2005, 2008			
Francesca James	Evelyn Johnson	2013			
John James	Jeff Martin	2006–07			
Steve James	Guard Pinkston	1984			
Georgann Johnson	Eugenia Robards	1981			
David Jordan	Trevor Dillon	1989			
Michael B. Jordan	Reggie Montgomery	2003–06			
Ben Jorgensen	Kevin Sheffield	1995–98			
Zachary Kady	Jamie Martin	1998–2001			
Katherine Kamhi	Pamela Kingsley	1980–82			
Steve Kanaly	Seabone Hunkle	1995			
Shannon Kane	Natalia Fowler	2008–11			
James Karen	Lincoln Tyler	1970			
Thorsten Kaye	Zach Slater	2004–11, 2013			
Barbara Kearns	Nina Cortlandt	1985–86			
Charles Keating	Damon Lazarre	1987			
Steven Keats	Alf Gresham	1970–2005			
Don Keefer	Horace Willoughby	1986			
Larry Keith	Nick Davis	1970–78, 1983–84, 1988, 1991, 1993–94, 1996–97, 2005			
Heather Kenzie	Di Henry	2008			
James Kiberd	Trevor Dillon	1989–2000			
Charles Kimbrough	Ned Rogers	1983			
Jason Kincaid	Sam Brady	1983–84			
Morgana King	Mrs Manganaro	1993			
Scott Kinworthy	Josh Madden	2005			
Michael E. Knight	Tad Martin	1982–86, 1988–90, 1992–2011, 2013			
Michael E. Knight	Ted Orsini	1993–94			
Alla Korot	Allie Doyle	1997–98			
Felicity LaFortune	Laurel Banning	1993–96			
Mark LaMura	Mark Dalton	1976–89, 1994–95, 2004–05			
Eva LaRue	Maria Santos	1993–97, 2002–05, 2010–11			
Jill Larson	Opal Cortlandt	1989–2011, 2013			
Laurence Lau	Greg Nelson	1981–86, 2008			
John-Paul Lavoisier	Orderly	2001			
Christopher Lawford	Charlie Brent	1992–96			
Elizabeth Lawrence	Myra Murdock Sloane	1979–91			
Richard Lawson	Lucas Barnes	1992–94			
Jean LeClerc	Jeremy Hunter	1985–92, 2001			
Elissa Leeds	Brooke English	1976			
Michael Levin	Dr. Gould	1993			
Carson Grace Levine	Colby Chandler	2000			
Melissa Leo	Linda Warner	1984–85			
Tom Ligon	Dr. Snow	1989			
Christina Bennett Lind	Bianca Montgomery	2010–11			
Greta Lind	Katie Kennicott	1990–91			
Peyton List	Bess	2004			
Michael Lowry	Jake Martin	1996–2000			
Susan Lucci	Erica Kane	1970–2011			
Susan Lucci	Jane Campbell	2011			
Jamie Luner	Liza Colby	2009–11			
Robert LuPone	Zach Grayson	1984–85			
Dorothy Lyman	Opal Cortlandt	1981–83			
Phyllis Lyons	Arlene Vaughan	1990–93			
Ray MacDonnell	Joe Martin	1970–2011, 2013			
Rebecca Mader	Morgan Gordan	2003			
Larkin Malloy	Travis Montgomery	1987–91, 1995–97, 2001			
Alexis Manta	Amanda Dillon	1996–2000			
Sean Marquette	Jamie Martin	1994–98			
Forbes March	Scott Chandler	1999–2000			
Amelia Marshall	Belinda Keefer	1996–99			
Rudolf Martin	Anton Lang	1993–96			
J.R. Martinez	Brot Monroe	2008–11			
Cameron Mathison	Ryan Lavery	1998–2011			
Eddie Matos	Ricky Torres	2010–11			
Robin Mattson	Janet Dillon	1994–2000			
Richard Mawe	Building Inspector	1983			
Richard Mawe	Building Superintendent	1985			
Jan Maxwell	Judge Myatt	2007			
Curt May	Bryan Sanders	1984-1986			
Donald May	Earl Foster	1986			
Adam Mayfield	Scott Chandler	2009–10			
Andrea McArdle	Cookie	1992			
Avis McCarther	Nancy Grant	1975			
Jesse McCartney	JR Chandler	1998–2001			
Cady McClain	Dixie Cooney	1988–96, 1998–2002, 2005–08, 2010–11, 2013			
Malachy McCourt	Mr. Spriggs	1992			
Malachy McCourt	Father Clarence	2004–09			
Kimberly McCullough	Robin Scorpio	2001			
Shane McDermott	Scott Chandler	1995–96			
Biff McGuire	Harry Flax	1972–73			
Michael & Brody McMackin	Trevor Martin	2011			
Pat McNamara	Walt Marsh	1993			
Robert Duncan McNeill	Charlie "Little Phil" Brent	1986–88			
Rory and Declan McTigue	AJ Chandler	2008–10			
Anne Meara	Peggy Moody	1992–99			
Marc Menard	Boyd Larraby	2002–04			
Lee Meriwether	Ruth Martin	1996–98, 2002–11			
Joanna Merlin	Judge Brauer	1997			
Matthew Metzger	Duke Buchanan	2005			
Taro Meyer	Talia Lamarr	1985			
Sylvia Miles	Jackie Diamond	1982			
Billy Miller	Richie Novak	2007–08			
Ellah Miller	Gabrielle Montgomery	2010–11			
Taylor Miller	Nina Cortlandt	1979–84, 1986–89, 1995–96, 2010			
Robert Milli	Lars Bogard	1982–83			
Mike Minor	Brandon Kingsley	1980–82			
Alicia Minshew	Kendall Hart	2002–11, 2013			
James Mitchell	Palmer Cortlandt	1979–2010			
Andrea Moar	Carrie Sanders Tyler	1981–82			
Brianne Moncrief	Colby Chandler	2008–09			
William Mooney	Paul Martin	1972–95			
Debbi Morgan	Angie Hubbard	1982–90, 2008–11, 2013			
Brianne and Morgan Mullen	Colby Chandler	2000			
Robert Morse	Harry the Bookie	1982			
Burke Moses	Andrew Miller	2003			
Meg Mundy	Eugenia von Voynavitch	1997–2001			
Durrant Murphy Jr.	Frankie Hubbard	1985			
Joseph Murphy	Braden Lavery	2005			
Alec Musser	Del Henry	2005–07			
Michael Nader	Dimitri Marick	1991–2001, 2013			
Hugo Napier	Mike Roy	1984–85			
Eric Nelsen	AJ Chandler	2013			
Portia Nelson	Rachel Gurney	1983–91			
Rosa Nevin	Cecily Davidson	1986–90, 1994–96			
Brooke Newton	Colby Chandler	2013			
Kathryn Newton	Colby Chandler	2002–04			
Irene Ng	An Li Chen	1991			
Agnes Nixon	Agnes Eckhardt	2005, 2008, 2011			
Agnes Nixon	Aggy	2008			
Kathleen Noone	Ellen Shepherd Chandler Dalton	1977–89			
Elizabeth Norment	Psychologist	2008			
Dannika Northcott	Kathy Martin	2010–11			
Michael Nouri	Caleb Cortlandt	2010–11			
Aidan and Liam O'Donnell	AJ Chandler	2004–05			
John O'Hurley	Kit Sterling	2011			
Jason Olive	Frankie Hubbard	2002			
Nicole Orth-Pallavicini	Marissa Rampal	1988			
Tito Ortiz	Mateo Santos	1994			
Maureen O'Sullivan	Olive Whelan	1981			
Samuel Page	Trey Kenyon	2002–03			
Danielle Parker	Emma Lavery	2010–11			
Rick Pasqualone	Charles Michaelson	2010			
Nathalie Paulding	Bianca Montgomery	1997–98			
J. Eddie Peck	Jake Martin	2000–03			
Melvin Van Peebles	Melvin Woods	2008			
Jason Pendergraft	Carter Anders	2013			
Sydney Penny	Julia Santos	1993–97, 2002, 2005–08			
Karen Person	Galen Henderson	1992–93			
Jordan Petruziello	Colby Chandler	1999			
Victoria Platt	Corinne Elroy	1996			
Jordan Lane Price	Celia Fitzgerald	2013			
Lindsay Price	An Li Chen Bodine	1991–93			
Elaine Princi	Dorian Lord	1992			
James Pritchett	Bill Anderson	1989			
Nicholas Pryor	Lincoln Tyler	1971			
Saundra Quarterman	Angie Hubbard	1990–91			
Lonnie Quinn	Will Cortlandt	1988–90			
Ken Rabat	Paul Martin	1970–72			
Leven Rambin	Lily Montgomery	2004–08, 2010			
Leven Rambin	Ava Benton	2007–08			
Dack Rambo	Steve Jacobi	1982–83			
Britton Reeder	Ian Slater	2010–11			
Andrew Ridings	JR Chandler	2002–03			
Eden Riegel	Bianca Montgomery	2000–10, 2013			
Kelly Ripa	Hayley Vaughan Santos	1990–2002, 2010			
Tony Roberts	Dr. Rosenstein	1994			
Amanda Hall Rogers	Cara Castillo	2003			
Gil Rogers	Ray Gardner	1977–99			
Ingrid Rogers	Taylor Roxbury-Cannon	1992–95			
Richard Roland	Jason Sheffield	1995–96			
Lauren E. Roman	Laura Kirk English	1995–98			
Heather Roop	Jane McIntyre	2013			
Paige Rowland	Kit Fisher	1998–99			
Lamman Rucker	Garret Williams	2005			
Barbara Rush	Nola Orsini	1992–94			
Mitchell Ryan	Alex Hunter	1986			
Michael Sabatino	Jonathan Kinder	1995–96			
Theresa Saldana	Christina Vargas	1997			
Laura San Giacomo	Louisa Sanchez	1988			
Michael Scalera	Jake Martin	1983–88			
James Scott	Ethan Cambias	2004–06			
Alexander Scourby	Nigel Fargate	1976–77			
Matt Servitto	Trask Bodine	1989–90			
Sabine Singh	Greenlee Smythe	2007–08			
Amanda Seyfried	Joni Stafford	2002–04			
Louise Shaffer	Goldie Kane	1987			
Ivan Shaw	Henry Chin	2003			
John Wesley Shipp	Carter Jones	1992			
Bret Shuford	Hospital Doctor	2005			
Christian Slater	Scotty	1984			
Christian Slater	Caleb Thompson	1986			
Cornelius Smith Jr.	Frankie Hubbard	2007–11			
David Lee Smith	John Youngblood	1993			
Abigail Spencer	Becca Tyree	1999–2001			
Gillian Spencer	Daisy Cortlandt	1979–89, 1991, 1994–96, 2010			
Mathew St. Patrick	Adrian Sword	1998–2000			
Heather Stanford	Nina Cortlandt	1984–85			
Chrishell Stause	Amanda Dillon	2005–11			
Stevie Steel	Heather Kent	2013			
Michael Storm	Larry Wolek	1970			
Saleisha Stowers	Cassandra Foster	2013			
Robin Strasser	Christina Karras	1976–79			
Robin Strasser	Dorian Lord	2003, 2005			
Albert Stratton	Eric Kane	1989–90			
Anna Stuart	Mary Greenlee Smythe	2002–09			
James Patrick Stuart	Will Cortlandt	1990–92			
Nicholas Surovy	Mike Roy	1983–84, 1988, 1998			
Robert Swan	Jeb Tidwell	1988			
Elizabeth Taylor	Chateau Boardmember	1984			
Kelli Taylor	Taylor Roxbury-Cannon	1995–96			
Darlene Tejeiro	Anita Santos	1995–97			
Esta TerBlanche	Gillian Andrassy	1997–2001, 2011			
Lynne Thigpen	Grace Keefer	1993–2000			
Bruce Thomas	Jonathan Kinder	1995			
Carmen Thomas	Hillary Wilson	1984–88			
Christine Thomas	Kate Martin	1970			
Denyse Tontz	Miranda Montgomery	2013			
David Tom	Paul Cramer	2004			
Heather Tom	Kelly Cramer	2004–05			
Michelle Trachtenberg	Lily Montgomery	1993–96			
Paige Turco	Melanie "Lanie" Cortlandt	1989–91			
Aiden Turner	Aidan Devane	2002–09			
Michael Tylo	Matt Connolly	1986–89			
Daniella van Graas	Fiona Sinclair	2002 (Note: Reliable sources note her work. However, TV Guide fails to note her appearance.)			
Denise Vasi	Randi Morgan	2008–11			
Liz Vassey	Emily Ann Sago	1988–91			
Jake Vaughan	Spike Lavery	2010–11			
Gwen Verdon	Judith Kingsley Sawyer	1982			
Jordi Vilasuso	Griffin Castillo	2010–11, 2013			
Donna Vivino	Erica Kane	1988			
Daniel von Bargen	Lt. Cody	1994–95			
Marcy Walker	Liza Colby	1981–84, 1995–2005			
T.C. Warner	Kelsey Jefferson	1995–98			
Joe Warren	Larry Colby	1983–84			
Ruth Warrick	Phoebe Tyler Wallingford	1970–2005			
Abby Wathen	Colby Chandler	2002			
Tuc Watkins	David Vickers	2005			
Carson Weaver	Colby Chandler	1999			
Fritz Weaver	Hugo Marick	1992			
Alyce Webb	Sarah Valentine	1984			
Ellen Wheeler	Cindy Parker Chandler	1987–89, 2000–01			
Ellen Wheeler	Karen Parker	1989			
Dondre Whitfield	Terrence Frye	1991–94			
Tudi Wiggins	Sarah Kingsley	1981–82			
Caroline Wilde	Bianca Montgomery	1990–91			
Lisa Wilkinson	Nancy Grant	1973–84, 1995			
Walt Willey	Jackson Montgomery	1987–2011			
Darnell Williams	Jesse Hubbard	1981–88, 1994, 2001, 2008–11, 2013			
Susan Willis	Helga Voynitzheva	1992			
Robert Scott Wilson	Pete Cortlandt	2013			
Finn Wittrock	Damon Miller	2009–11			
Peter White	Lincoln Tyler	1976–2005			
Robert S. Woods	Bo Buchanan	2004–05			
Greg Wrangler	Pierce Riley	1996			
Laura Wright	Ally Rescott	1991–92			
Samuel E. Wright	Bill Fisher	1983			
Z. Wright	Frankie Hubbard	1986–91			
John J. York	Mac Scorpio	2001			
Jacob Young	JR Chandler	2003–11			
Malgorzata Zajaczkowska	Corvina Lang	1994–95			

== See also ==
- List of All My Children characters
