= Jesse Hubbard and Angie Baxter =

Fictional couple

Jesse Hubbard
- All My Children character
- Portrayed by: Darnell Williams
- Duration: 1981–1988; 1994–1995; 2001–2002; 2008–2011; 2013
- First appearance: January 3, 1981
- Last appearance: September 2, 2013
- Created by: Agnes Nixon; Wisner Washam
- Introduced by: Agnes Nixon; Jorn Winther
- Crossover appearances: Loving
In-universe information
- Occupation: Police Chief
- Parents: Lionel Hubbard; Ellie Grant Hubbard
- Half-brothers: Eugene Hubbard
- Spouse: Angie Baxter (1983–1988, 2008–present)
- Children: Frankie Hubbard; Natalia Fowler; Ellie Hubbard
- Stepchildren: Cassandra Foster
- Grandchildren: William
- Aunts and uncles: Franklin Grant
- First cousins: Jacob Foster; Carl Blair, Jr.
- Other relatives: Randi Morgan Hubbard

Jesse and Angie Hubbard (Darnell Williams and Debbi Morgan) are daytime TV's first African American supercouple.

Jesse and Angela Hubbard are fictional characters and a supercouple from the ABC and The Online Network daytime drama All My Children. Jesse is portrayed by Darnell Williams and Angie is portrayed by Debbi Morgan. (Note: From 1990 to 1991, Angie was portrayed by Saundra Quarterman, who later became a regular on the ABC sitcom Hangin' with Mr. Cooper.) Jesse first appeared in Pine Valley in 1981 as the nephew of Dr. Frank Grant, who assumed custody after the death of his sister (Jesse's mother). Angie first appeared in 1982, as the daughter of a well-to-do Pine Valley couple. Shortly after Angie's first appearance on the show, they were paired with one another, becoming the first African American supercouple in Daytime history. Jesse and Angie were best friends to fellow supercouple Greg Nelson and Jenny Gardner. They are arguably the two most popular African American characters in soap opera history and have been credited for improving African American representation in the genre.

Angie also appeared on Loving and The City. (Note: Consequently, Debbi Morgan is the first actor to portray the same character as a regular cast member on three different soap operas.) Along with her son Frankie Hubbard and former heiress Skye Chandler, she is one of only three individuals who have been regular characters on three ABC soap operas. (Note: Frankie Hubbard has been featured on All My Children, Loving and The City; while Skye Chandler was featured on All My Children, One Life to Live and General Hospital.)

Angela Hubbard
- All My Children character
- Portrayed by: Debbi Morgan (1982–1990, 1993–2013); Saundra Quarterman (1990–1991)
- Duration: 1982–1991; 1993–1997; 2008–2011; 2013
- First appearance: January 1982
- Last appearance: September 2, 2013
- Created by: Agnes Nixon and Wisner Washam
- Introduced by: Agnes Nixon and Jorn Winther (1982); Haidee Granger (1993); Jean Dadario Burke (1995); Julie Hanan Carruthers (2008)
- Crossover appearances: Loving; The City
In-universe information
- Other names: Angela Irene Baxter
- Occupation: Physician, specializing in infectious diseases; Chief of Staff of Pine Valley Hospital [Nov 2009 to Present]
- Parents: Les Baxter; Pat Baxter
- Siblings: Teddy Baxter (Note: Angie mentions having a brother on 4-22-10)
- Spouse: Jesse Hubbard (1983–1988, 2008–present); Charles Harrison (1995); Jacob Foster (1996–2005)
- Children: Frankie Hubbard; Ellie Hubbard
- Adoptive children: Cassandra Foster
- Stepchildren: Natalia Fowler
- Grandchildren: William
- Aunts and uncles: Flora Baxter
- Other relatives: Randi Morgan Hubbard

== Background ==
=== Casting ===
Actress Debbi Morgan was working in Los Angeles, California, on an episode of Trapper John, M.D. when she saw that a new storyline was being introduced on All My Children, which involved actor Darnell Williams in the role of Jesse Hubbard. Morgan's feeling that Jesse might need a love interest, as she expressed as much to her agent in New York, matched that of the show's producers, who were searching for a young woman to fill the role of Angie Baxter. When Morgan read for the part, she acquired the role within the same day.

Williams was a regular dancer on Soul Train in the mid-1970s. Later that decade, he was a cast member of the Broadway musical Your Arms Too Short to Box with God. This, before acquiring the role of Jesse.

=== Writing ===
All My Children creator Agnes Nixon was able to intrigue male and female audiences of all ages by focusing on young adult romances that included not only romance and sex but their issues in growing and learning as individuals. Social issues were also applied. This specific formula caused All My Children's popularity to rise in the 1980s. The Jesse and Angie pairing, as well as fellow supercouple Greg Nelson and Jenny Gardner, were one notable aspect of Nixon's writing that prompted young high school and college students to race home just to view the soap opera.

When characters Jenny and Jesse were killed off instead of being recast by new actors once the actors decided to leave their roles, it was so that no other actors could portray them. To Nixon, these actors were the characters. Morgan saw Jesse's death as bittersweet. She pointed to Williams leaving the series as one of her toughest moments as part of the cast, but how it also provided interesting story. "It really affected me more from a personal standpoint than from an actor's standpoint," she said. "From a personal standpoint, Darnell and I were like hooked at the neck or the back or something; we'd gotten to be such good friends. But from an actor's point of view, it didn't really bother me as much because I knew that it would just open up so many more avenues for Angie to take."

=== Jacob and Angie ===
For years, All My Children fans clamored for the reunion of Jesse and Angie. However, the nature of Jesse's death (an on-screen death in the hospital as the result of a gunshot wound) made this all but impossible, even by soap opera standards. Eventually, fans got the next best thing.

In 1993, Morgan joined the cast of the soap opera Loving, reprising her role as Angie (who settled in Corinth, Pennsylvania). In 1995, Williams joined the cast as a mysterious stranger named Jacob Johnson. Jacob, whose actual surname was Foster, bore an uncanny resemblance to Angie's late husband Jesse and was revealed to be a relative of Jesse. Originally, Angie resisted any type of relationship with Jacob, despite her attraction to him. In 1995, Jesse's spirit visited Jacob just prior to Angie's marriage to Charles Harrison and convinced him to pursue a relationship with Angie. Angie and Jacob ultimately fell in love and emerged as the core couple when Loving was relaunched as The City, eventually moving to New York City's SoHo district (along with Angie's son Frank), marrying, and adopting a daughter.

After The City was canceled, Williams returned to All My Children four years later as "Jesse", but as an angel.

=== Rewrite and return ===
Angie and Jesse are about to be reunited and it feels so right. One of daytime’s most memorable couples from the 1980s is returning to ABC’s All My Children. Wait a minute. Didn’t Jesse die on camera?

— Amy Amatangelo of newspaper Boston Herald

In late 2007, the producers of All My Children announced Williams and Morgan's return to the series, with long-term contracts. It was on December 14, 2007, that the official All My Children website posted an article with the headline Angie and Jesse return to All My Children! The article suggested that Angie's return would start with being called back to Pine Valley Hospital to assist on a case, where she would be reunited with a living Jesse Hubbard. Viewers were skeptical of Jesse's return, since he had an onscreen death and appeared in ghost form several times afterwards on the series. There was sentiment that if Williams was returning as anyone, it had to be as Jacob Foster. Viewers wondered for weeks if Williams would truly return as Jesse or Jesse's look-alike Jacob. It was later confirmed, however, that Jesse did not die in 1988 after all and that Williams would be resuming the role.

Morgan returned as Angie on January 18, 2008, and Williams returned as Jesse on January 25. To start the storyline where Jesse is brought back, the writers thought up a plot where characters Greenlee Smythe and Quentin contract a weird woods-related disease that triggers asphyxiation. Angie, now an infectious-disease specialist, is paged to Pine Valley Hospital to consult on the case: "Quentin will turn out to be Angie and Jesse’s son, Frankie", said Julie Hanan Carruthers (the show's executive producer), and noted that Angie's adopted daughter, Cassandra, would also join the show. ABC consulted with Agnes Nixon (retired at that time) on how to resurrect Jesse, since he was shot to death in 1988: "We saw Angie sobbing on his chest, but I think the audience is invested enough in them as a couple that they will embrace our solution," Carruthers stated.

Carruthers further relayed that Angie would not at first know that Jesse is alive. "We’re going to play that out for a couple of weeks. Rightfully, it’ll be Tad, to whom Jesse has appeared in spirit form, who reunites them," she stated. "Angie and Jesse made an eternal imprint on viewers, and many fans will not believe he's alive," stated Brian Frons, president of ABC Daytime.

When addressing his character's "return from the dead", Williams explained: "I’m the same character, but it’s a whole new experience. They had to figure out a way to bring him back to life. The word is that apparently he never died. He had to fake his death in order to secure the safety of his family."

In the 1980s, soap operas were not as short as they are today on the inclusion of African American characters. "I think it has moved a thousand steps backwards," said Morgan. "It just amazes me that here we are in 2008 and we have so little representation on daytime. I don’t understand it and I think it’s shameful."

Williams detailed that the lack of diversity is one of the reasons they were approached to return to the series: "I think All My Children kind of shot themselves in the foot by allowing the canvas to become so nondiversified. And they found themselves sort of chasing their tails trying to figure out how to fix it... They came up with the idea, 'Well, why not bring this core couple back that had such an appeal to such a broad audience?'"

Morgan stated that it took her only about 30 seconds to accept the offer to return to the role of Angie. She could not remember a time in her career where she felt so welcomed. "It was like a homecoming. There were members of the crew that were here 20 years ago. It was just so heartfelt, it made me cry. I couldn’t believe it. I’ve played the character for so long, it’s like stepping into a pair of old shoes, as they say."

The response from fans after the announcement of their return managed to astound both actors. "The amount of people that are interested still is kind of overwhelming," Williams stated. "The first thing they usually say, 'I'm going to call my mother and my sisters and my brother right away and tell them that All My Children is back on the block.'" Williams relayed his hope for the writers to progress slowly in reuniting Jesse and Angie: "I hope they take it at a decent pace to where the audience will believe it. If they go too quickly and make us a happily ever couple, that gets kind of boring. But I have faith that they are going to do the right thing."

Soap operas tend to have preposterous storylines at times, and Morgan stressed to the producers of the show that she wants none of that for Angie: "Soaps have changed a lot since I was on, and so many of the stories are so over the top and crazy to me. The kind of actress that I am, I couldn’t play all that hokey kind of stuff. So I would really like to see the shows return to more real-life drama that’s akin to what goes on with people in their everyday life."

In January 2008, the Alicia Keys song "Like You'll Never See Me Again" was used in advertisements for All My Children, to promote Jesse and Angie's return. The song was used again in the February 15 and 18, 2008 episodes of the series, when the couple was reunited after 20 years.

== Storyline ==
=== 1981–82 ===
Jesse Hubbard—originally from Center City, Pennsylvania (Note: Like Pine Valley, Center City is a fictional Pennsylvania municipality on All My Children. It is not to be confused with the downtown section of Philadelphia, which is also referred to as Center City.)—first appears in the adjacent town of Pine Valley as the recently orphaned 17-year-old nephew of Dr. Frank Grant (John Danelle). (Note: In the February 8, 2008 episode of All My Children, Jesse's date of birth was firmly established as February 8, 1964.) After the death of Jesse's widowed mother Ellie (Mary Alice), Jesse leaves Chicago and moves in with Ellie's brother Frank and his wife Nancy (Lisa Wilkinson), who are next door neighbors and close friends of Dr. Joe Martin (Ray MacDonnell) and his wife Ruth (Mary Fickett). Like his best friend Jenny Gardner (Kim Delaney), Jesse is from the "wrong side of the tracks".

Jesse soon falls in love with Angie Baxter, a well-to-do teenager from Pine Valley high society. However, Angie's father Les Baxter (Antonio Fargas) strongly disapproves, feeling that Jesse is not good enough for his daughter. After Jesse is falsely accused of attempting to rape Angie's former friend Liza Colby (Marcy Walker), he flees to the Hell's Kitchen section of New York City with Jenny (who leaves town once Liza threatens to reveal that Jenny's father Ray Gardner raped Ruth years earlier). After finding jobs to make ends meet, Jesse and Jenny remain in Hell's Kitchen for most of the summer of 1982. Angie is heartbroken. When Liza finally confesses that she lied, Jesse returns to Pine Valley and resumes dating Angie, and Jenny returns to her boyfriend Greg Nelson (Laurence Lau).

=== 1983–1985 ===
Jesse's desire to make love to Angie is evident, but Angie refuses until they are married. Angie and Jesse elope, because Angie is afraid of her parents' reaction if she tells them of their intended plans. Soon thereafter, Angie finds out that she is pregnant. Angie confides in her mother Pat Baxter (Lee Chamberlin) that she and Jesse are married and that she is pregnant. Angie is scared to tell Jesse; her insecurities grow when she thinks that Jesse is falling in love with another woman. Pat has a conversation with Jesse about the possibility that Angie could become pregnant. Jesse replies, "I couldn't even think of it for another few years."

When Angie learns of this, she divorces Jesse without telling him she is pregnant. Les encourages Angie to give her baby away, and she starts adoption proceedings. Their baby is adopted by a couple. Jesse is very upset with Angie for not telling him about their baby boy and for giving him up. He desperately tries to track his son down with the help of his friend Vera. When Angie begs him to take her back and to forgive her, they search for their son together. They locate and kidnap him, then flee to Sea City. The couple names the baby after Jesse's uncle Frank, who had died just prior to the child's birth. After Jesse and Angie convince a judge to give custody of the baby back to them because Jesse's signature was forged by Angie's father, they remarry. The couple starts their new life in the Grant home, after Jesse's aunt Nancy and cousin Carl relocate to Chicago. The Hubbards are later joined by Angie's mother Pat, who divorces Les.

By the summer of 1984, Greg Nelson and Jenny Gardner are married, and Jenny has become a successful fashion model. Tony Barclay, a male model who is obsessed with Jenny, plots to kill Greg by rigging his water ski to explode. When Jenny switches skis with him at the last minute, she is killed instead, at the relatively young age of 20. (Note: In the May 20, 2008 episode of All My Children, Jenny's birth and death years are firmly established as January 20, 1964 and August 13, 1984, respectively.) The residents of Pine Valley are stunned into grief. Jesse is particularly devastated, as he must cope with the loss of his closest friend.

In 1985, Jesse and Angie's relationship is threatened once again when his half-brother Eugene Hubbard (Tom Wright) arrives in Pine Valley, and immediately sets his sights on Angie. Also new in town is nightclub singer Yvonne Caldwell (Vanessa Bell Calloway), who comes to Pine Valley at Eugene's request. Her plan is to lure Jesse away from Angie so that they will divorce and Angie will find solace with Eugene.

Yvonne is able to seduce Jesse and was about to have sex. Eugene concocts a lie so Angie will arrive at Yvonne's house just in time to catch Jesse in bed with Yvonne. This leads to a dramatic brawl between Angie and Yvonne. Angie is furious and throws Jesse out of the house, but she eventually forgives him after finding about Eugene's plans. Later, a pregnant Yvonne lies and says that the child she is carrying belongs to Jesse. After admitting that she has lied, Yvonne gives her baby away to a black market baby adoption ring. When Jesse learns of Eugene's schemes, the two brothers also have a vicious fight, after which Eugene leaves Pine Valley and is not heard from again.

=== 1986–91 ===
Convinced to seek political office by electronics mogul Palmer Cortlandt (James Mitchell) and his son Ross Chandler (Robert Gentry), Jesse announces his candidacy for a seat on the Pine Valley Town Council. Palmer and Ross withdraw their support after Jesse refuses to act as their political puppet. Nevertheless, Jesse wages an effective campaign and wins the election. However, he soon finds politics to be too restrictive for his tastes, and resigns from the Town Council.

Jesse works to find out the identity of "Mr. Big," the leader of the black market baby adoption ring to whom Yvonne gave her baby. Mr. Big threatens Yvonne and, to protect herself and her son, she falsely accuses senatorial candidate Travis Montgomery (Larkin Malloy) of being the baby's father. Mr. Big then blackmails Travis into paying $2 million to keep the false allegation from becoming public and ruining his campaign. After several months, Jesse discovers that Mr. Big is actually his own father-in-law, Les Baxter. Attempting to avoid arrest, Les confronts his son-in-law with a gun. In the ensuing struggle, Jesse accidentally pushes Les down a flight of stairs, and Les is killed in the fall. Having witnessed the struggle and the fall, Angie is devastated and blames Jesse for her father's death. She once again separates from Jesse, who is heartbroken.

Soon, Jesse and Angie reconcile. She completes medical school and becomes a doctor, despite being sexually harassed by one of her professors, Dr. Allen Voight (John Canary). Jesse joins the Pine Valley Police Department and rises through the ranks quickly, soon becoming a plain clothes detective. During this period Angie befriends Cindy Parker (Ellen Wheeler), the widow of an intravenous drug user who died from AIDS. The couple takes Cindy and her son Scott (Philip Amelio) into their home, and are her closest supporters when she develops AIDS herself. Cindy is ostracized by many Pine Valley residents, including Skye Chandler (Robin Christopher), Greg's mother Enid Nelson (Natalie Ross), and a hate group that sets fire to the Hubbard home. Cindy later died, but not before falling in love with and marrying Skye's uncle Stuart Chandler (David Canary), who adopts Scott.

Jesse develops an excellent reputation within the police force and the community. In 1988, he is assigned to guard wealthy businessman John Remington (Eddie Earl Hatch), whose life has apparently been threatened. While in the line of duty, Jesse takes a bullet meant for Remington. Despite receiving prompt medical attention, Jesse is pronounced dead a few days later. (Note: In the February 8, 2008 episode of All My Children, the date of Jesse's supposed death was firmly established as June 28, 1988.)

Remington (or "Remy" as he is often called) tries to start a romantic relationship with the recently widowed Angie, but his attempts are unsuccessful. This is due in part to the fact that Angie is still grieving, but Remington's association with Jesse's death makes an Angie-Remy relationship all but impossible. Eventually, Angie has brief romances with medical colleagues Jeff Martin (Jeffrey Byron) and Cal Cummings (Count Stovall), as well as police officer Derek Frye (William Christian). At one point she is engaged to Dr. Cliff Warner (Peter Bergman), but he ends the relationship to remarry his former wife Nina Cortlandt (Taylor Miller). In 1991, Angie leaves Pine Valley and moves to California, taking her son Frankie with her.

=== 1993–97: Jacob and Angie on Loving and The City ===
In 1993, Angie and a teenage Frankie (Alimi Ballard) settle in Corinth, Pennsylvania, where they reconnect with Jeremy Hunter (Jean LeClerc), an acquaintance from Pine Valley. Her life is almost cut short when she develops aplastic anemia. However, she recovers after receiving a bone marrow transplant.

Angie is convinced she has found true love again with local police detective Charles Harrison (Geoffrey Ewing), who is eventually appointed chief of the Corinth Police Department. Then, as fate would have it, she meets Jacob Foster (Darnell Williams), a mysterious stranger who bears an uncanny resemblance to Jesse, and later turns out to be related to him. Originally, Angie resists any type of relationship with Jacob, despite her attraction to him. In 1995, Jesse's spirit seemingly visits Jacob just prior to Angie's marriage to Charles, and convinces Jacob to pursue a relationship with Angie. Jacob and Angie ultimately fall in love, prompting her to divorce Charles. Soon thereafter Angie, Jacob, and a college-bound Frankie move to New York City's SoHo district, along with several other residents of Corinth. They are all anxious to relocate and make a fresh start after a serial killer murders a number of their friends and acquaintances, including Jeremy Hunter and Angie's close friend Stacey Forbes (Lauren-Marie Taylor).

While in New York, Angie opens a free medical clinic at 212 Greene Street in SoHo, a building owned by billionaire Sydney Chase (Morgan Fairchild), and later by Port Charles businesswoman Tracy Quartermaine (Jane Elliot). Angie eventually marries Jacob, who opens a bar in the same building with their friend Buck Huston (Philip Brown). Almost immediately upon reaching SoHo, the couple takes in a foster child named Kayla Jones (Erica Mer), who happens to be Caucasian. A group of white supremacists object to the notion of an African American couple raising a White child. Undaunted, Angie and Jacob continue to raise Kayla, but are heartbroken when she is adopted by another couple. However, in late March 1997, Angie finds an abandoned infant girl in a dumpster. Naming the baby Cassandra, Angie and Jacob ultimately adopt her.

=== Jesse's "returns" ===
In 1994, a tornado rips through Pine Valley, leaving Jenny Gardner's brother Tad Martin (Michael E. Knight) near death. While unconscious, Tad is seemingly greeted by the spirit of Jesse (whom Tad first befriended in high school). Along with Jenny, as well as Tad's surrogate mother Nola Orsini (Barbara Rush), "Jesse" encourages Tad to return to his family in the land of the living.

In 2001, Jesse appears to return to Pine Valley, but as an angel whose mission it is to help Gillian Andrassy (who had recently been slain by a hitwoman who mistook her for Anna Devane) make a smooth transition to the afterlife. Also, "Jesse" visits Tad, as well as Frankie (Jason Olive), who is serving as a medical intern at Pine Valley Hospital.

=== 2007–2010 ===
In December 2007, private investigator Aidan Devane meets a mysterious man named Quentin (Cornelius Smith Jr.). Quentin helps Aidan successfully locate Greenlee Smythe and Zach Slater, both of whom had been missing for weeks and presumed dead. Greenlee and Zach are found in the woods at the bottom of an old bomb shelter, along with an old skeleton.

By January 2008, it becomes apparent that Quentin and Greenlee have both contracted a rare illness requiring their hospitalization in Pine Valley. Without first meeting Quentin, Dr. Joe Martin contacts Angie — now a specialist on infectious diseases — to consult on the case, much to the delight of her old friend Tad Martin. Angie and Joe are both shocked to later learn that "Quentin" is actually Angie's son Frankie Hubbard (whose middle name is Quentin). The 25-year-old Frankie, (Note: Although Frankie's age was accelerated in the mid-1980s and again upon his relocation to Corinth in 1993, the rapid aging was reversed when he re-emerged as "Quentin" in 2007. The placement of his age at 25 in 2008 reconciles with the fact that his birth was depicted in 1983.) who has served on active military duty in Iraq, apparently suffers from a rare poison he contracted while living in the woods. Now divorced from Jacob Foster, Angie spends her first few days back in Pine Valley searching for the cause of Frankie and Greenlee's illness, while trying to understand why her son remained out of contact with his family after returning from Iraq. It is apparent to Frankie and to Angie's close friends that she continues to long for Jesse, even after two decades.

Unbeknownst to almost everyone, Frankie is visited in his hospital room by Jesse, who — despite strong evidence to the contrary — is very much alive. Jesse soon reveals his presence to a stunned Tad, who (like his sister Jenny) considers Jesse to be his best friend. Jesse explains that he is pretending to be dead in order to protect his family, whose lives have been threatened, and that he only returned to Pine Valley because Frankie's medical condition has placed him near death. Tad, who once incorrectly believed that his former wife Dixie Cooney had died, urges Jesse to tell Angie and Frankie that he is alive. Jesse refuses, and makes Tad promise not to reveal the truth to anyone. When Tad's current wife Krystal Carey (Bobbie Eakes) inadvertently discovers him, Jesse elicits a similar promise from her. However, the comatose Frankie is aware of his father's presence in his hospital room, and continues to suspect that something is amiss after he recovers.

Jesse attempts to leave Pine Valley, but is assaulted and mugged by a couple pretending to be a battered wife and her abusive husband. He is rushed back to Pine Valley Hospital, keeping him in town a bit longer. On Valentine's Day, he attempts to leave town by train. Circumstance leads Angie to the Pine Valley train station as well, at approximately the same time. As she waits for her train, she sees Jesse sitting on another train as it is leaving the station. She chases the departing train, screaming Jesse's name, and collapses onto the tracks in tears when the train continues on and disappears from sight. Dejected, she walks back to the station. However, the train unexpectedly returns, and Angie is stunned to see Jesse step onto the platform, alive and well. Embracing each other, the couple is reunited for the first time in 20 years.

Jesse explains to Angie (and later to Frankie) that he was kidnapped and that his abductors faked his death. He was brutally beaten, and the lives of Angie and Frankie were threatened in the process. Eventually, one of his captors took him to the woods and dug a grave in which Jesse was about to be buried. Jesse managed to turn the tables on the captor, kill him in self-defense, and bury him in that same hole.

As the Hubbard family is reunited, Derek Frye (Charles Parnell) -- now chief of the Pine Valley Police Department—informs Greenlee, Zach and their loved ones that the skeleton in the bomb shelter with them was John Remington, the man whom Jesse was protecting at the time of his supposed death. Soon thereafter, Tad is approached by a man identifying himself as Robert Gardner (David Rasche), Tad's biological uncle and the brother of his abusive biological father Ray Gardner (Gil Rogers), who died in 1982. Robert, an agent with the FBI, slowly begins to gain the trust of some Pine Valley residents, including Tad's biological mother Opal Cortlandt (Jill Larson), and soon convinces Jesse that his primary captor—nicknamed "Papel"—has been killed. However, the Hubbards and Martins are unaware that Papel is actually Robert himself, and that it was Robert who murdered Remington. Robert was apparently trying to locate a pair of large uncut diamonds, one of which Remington had secretly hidden inside a stuffed animal that he gave to Frankie as a child. Unaware of the diamond, Angie later gave the stuffed animal to her daughter Cassandra Foster.

Just as an 18-year-old Cassandra (Yaya DaCosta) arrives in Pine Valley from Paris and finally meets Jesse, the legal declaration of Jesse's death is nullified, and he and Angie decide to remarry. On the eve of the wedding, Greg Nelson returns to town, reuniting with the Hubbards. It is a particularly poignant moment, as Greg and his late wife Jenny are Jesse and Angie's oldest and dearest friends.

On May 21, 2008, Jesse and Angie's friends look on as the couple is remarried at Zach Slater's hotel and casino, in the extravagant ceremony that they never had in their younger days. Frankie and Cassandra serve as best man and maid of honor. As a special surprise, Jesse arranges for R&B superstar Ne-Yo to sing his yet-to-be released song "Stop This World" as Angie makes her entrance. During the reception, Jesse catches Robert searching Cassandra's hotel room for the diamond. Holding Robert at gunpoint, Jesse reveals that he has discovered the diamond, and that he deduced some time ago that Robert is the real Papel. After Angie unexpectedly enters the room, Robert takes her hostage and attempts to flee the hotel, shooting at Frankie and Cassandra. Although the two of them are unharmed, Greg is struck by a glancing bullet, while Tad is critically injured and Julia Santos Keefer is fatally wounded. However, Robert's escape attempt fails and he is apprehended through the combined efforts of Jesse, Angie and Frankie.

Weeks later, Derek resigns as police chief and moves to California. Using U.S. Attorney Samuel Woods (Mario Van Peebles) to deliver the message, the mayor offers the job to Jesse. Although he clearly aches to accept the offer, Jesse previously promised Angie that he would not return to law enforcement. Thus, he initially declines the offer and accepts a position at Pine Valley University as a criminology professor. However, Angie soon realizes that her stance on the issue is an unreasonable one and relents. Jesse then accepts the appointment as police chief. His first case involves the murder of ex-convict Richie Novak. When Cassandra unexpectedly becomes one of the suspects in the crime, her fragile relationship with her new stepfather is severely strained. After she is cleared, Cassandra returns to Paris to live with her father Jacob.

Some time thereafter, Jesse reveals that—during his 20-year absence—he suffered a nervous breakdown. He eventually developed a romantic relationship with his doctor Rebecca Fowler (Laura Koffman), and the two had a daughter named Natalia (Shannon Kane). In late 2007, Rebecca learned that she had an inoperable brain tumor (which she kept secret), and shortly thereafter Jesse learned that Frankie was near death with a mysterious illness. Realizing that Angie was the true love of Jesse's life, Rebecca and Natalia staged a huge argument and "forced" Jesse to return to Pine Valley. Months later, Natalia (now age 19) follows and her paternity is revealed. When Rebecca's medical condition comes to light, Angie invites her to stay in the Hubbard home, so that Jesse and Natalia can be together, and so that Rebecca will not be alone in her final days. In February 2009, Rebecca dies.

Soon thereafter, Frankie's military unit is reactivated. After marrying his girlfriend Randi Morgan (Denise Vasi), he returns to Iraq. In early May, Frankie's convoy is ambushed. His family and friends—including fellow soldiers Taylor Thompson (Beth Ehlers) and Brot Monroe (J.R. Martinez) -- are relieved to discover that he survived. and has been rushed to Landstuhl Regional Medical Center (the U.S. military hospital in Landstuhl, Germany). However, Frankie's hands are crushed by a machine during the attack, and the injuries could end his medical career. Randi's efforts to console Frankie are disrupted when her former lover Henry North comes to Pine Valley. After Henry is found murdered, Randi is mistakenly led to believe that she killed him. Jesse risks his career by altering the crime scene to cover any evidence of his daughter-in-law's involvement in the man's death.

=== 2011 ===
Around the time of May 2011 Angie found out that she was going blind due to her treating a young boy in the ER without protective gear on. She began taking medication to keep from the disease taking full control, but soon found out she was pregnant and discontinued the medication much to the disagreement of Jesse because it would harm the baby. Angie officially became legally blind, April 2011. On March 30, 2011, Angie gave birth to a daughter named Ellie. Maya, a teen who has just given birth and has no support from her parents leaves her baby in Brot's police car. Angie goes into labor out at the former Justice of the Piece building Jesse calls for help after Angie passes out from labor pains. When help does not arrive in time he is forced to deliver the baby himself. Brot being the first one on the scene discovers the unnamed baby hidden away in his car. After failed attempts to get baby Ellie breathing after delivery and Jesse afraid of Angie being overwhelmed with grief at her baby being stillborn with Brots help he switches the babies. Jesse then buries baby Ellie under a tree saying that her parents will always love her. At the hospital they name the new baby girlLucille "Lucy" Eleanor Hubbard. A little time later Maya is persuaded by Frankie to work for the Hubbard's as help for taking care of Lucy. Angie and Maya grow close, and Maya begins telling Angie about the little girl she abandoned. Angie deciding to help her search for her lost child become to unbearable for Jesse and on September 4, 2011 it is revealed to Angela the truth about her baby girl. September 14, 2011 Maya officially moved out taking baby Lucy with her leaving Angie and Jesse devastated.

== Reception and impact ==
Jesse and Angie are the world's first African American supercouple. This resulted in the pairing being listed in The News & Advance's Timeline of daytime soaps under the title of 1984: Daytime’s first black supercouple, All My Children’s Angie and Jesse, are introduced.

The couple's impact on viewers has often been documented in various other versions. Motivational speaker and author Angela D. Lewis recalled her experience watching the Jesse and Angie love story while attending the University of South Carolina in the 1980s. Students would crowd into the Russell House from 1-2 p.m. each weekday to watch Jesse and Angie. Lewis stated, "We were always part of a huge crowd in the student center — not only girls, but plenty of guys, too! — watching All My Children to see Jesse and Angie. The student union was flooded. Many of us would even arrange our class schedules around the soap!"

Darnell Williams and Kim Delaney shared a noticeable amount of chemistry in their respective roles as Jesse and Jenny. However, it is widely believed the producers of All My Children shied away from pairing them as a romantic couple, as a Black male/White female relationship was still considered to be a taboo on daytime television in the early 1980s. In 2024, Charlie Mason from Soaps She Knows placed Jesse and Angie at 14th and 13th place on his ranked list of Soaps' 40 Most Iconic Characters of All Time, writing, "Darnell Williams and Debbi Morgan not only gave us soaps' first Black supercouple, they gave us a couple that was so perfect, not even death could keep them apart for good".

=== Scholarly and Jesse's "death" ===
Angie, having cried on Jesse's chest upon his "death" in 1988. This moment is reported to have significantly impacted viewers.

Jesse's "death" with Angie saying goodbye to him is often noted for being an unforgettable moment in daytime history; this specific impact was examined in author Louise Spence's book Watching Daytime Soap Operas: The Power Of Pleasure. When Williams left his role of Jesse, Spence documented fans' reaction to the news. One letter from a viewer with the initials of P.B. detailed a saddened state to see Williams having left the role. The viewer had never cried so much for an actor on a soap opera, and every time the viewer saw Jesse's wife, Angie, onscreen after Jesse's "death", the viewer would also cry.

Another viewer of initials K.H. voiced that Debbi Morgan deserved an Emmy for her portrayal of Angie Baxter. Viewer K.H. felt that Morgan constantly performed with such strong emotion and sensitivity and that because of that, she could not help but touch everyone's heart. Also mentioned was Morgan's portrayal of grief at Jesse's "death" being so moving, that the author of the letter felt as though a member within his or her own immediate family had taken the deadly bullet.

Jesse's "death" made website inthe80s.com's list of Memorable Television Events From The Eighties.

=== Guest-starring and magazines ===
ABC capitalized on the chemistry and popularity of Williams and Morgan by making them the hosts of New York Hot Tracks, a popular music video program which aired late night on Fridays in the 1980s. The genre of videos shown were primarily R&B, Dance and Hip-Hop, with a few Pop videos thrown in every now and then.

In 1985, during the Jesse/Angie/Eugene story arc, Debbi Morgan and Tom Wright (Eugene) appeared in two music videos by the R&B group Cameo: "Attack Me With Your Love" and "Single Life". The former video features a brief appearance by Laurence Fishburne, and its storyline is continued in the latter video.

When magazine Soap Opera Digest picked their January 3, 1984 Jesse and Angie cover for their Friday November 11, 2005 cover in celebration of their magazine turning thirty years old, the following was stated:

"January 3, 1984 Daytime's first black supercouple — ALL MY CHILDREN's Angie (Debbi Morgan) and Jesse (Darnell Williams) captured hearts and helped revolutionize the daytime landscape."

Essence magazine, an American fashion, lifestyle and entertainment source, which was the first monthly magazine for African American women, noted Jesse and Angie as well. In an instance of elaborating on Angie's portrayer, the publication cited: "Fans of All My Children have watched the ever-sweet Angie Hubbard evolve from a fresh-faced candy striper into a full-fledged physician — and, in the process, they have felt they've come to know Morgan too. And in a way they have. Both Angie and Debbi are fun-loving, determined women, with high moral standards and lots of integrity."

Kierna Mayo of Essence credited Jesse and Angie for their positive African American representation in the media, as well as their chemistry.

In January 2008, Entertainment Weekly listed the couple at #1 on their list of 17 Great Soap Supercouples.

=== Awards ===
After an unsuccessful 1982 nomination, Darnell Williams's portrayal of Jesse Hubbard earned him the 1983 Daytime Emmy Award for Outstanding Actor in a Supporting Role in a Drama Series. In 1985, he won the award for Outstanding Lead Actor in a Drama Series, becoming the first black actor to win multiple Daytime Emmys for the same role. He also earned a 2012 nomination for Outstanding Lead Actor in a Drama Series.

"During her long tenure on the show, Morgan earned two Daytime Emmy nominations, winning the trophy in 1989," stated Essence. In addition, Morgan was nominated for Outstanding Lead Actress in a Drama Series in 2009, 2011, and 2012.

== See also ==
- List of supercouples
