= Cassandra Foster =

- The City character
- Sal Stowers as Cassandra Foster
- Portrayed by: Yaya DaCosta (2008); Sal Stowers (2013)
- Duration: 1997; 2008; 2013
- First appearance: March 28, 1997
- Last appearance: September 2, 2013
- Created by: James Harmon Brown and Barbara Esensten
- Introduced by: Jean Dadario Burke (1997); Julie Hanan Carruthers (2008); Ginger Smith (2013)
- Crossover appearances: All My Children
- Yaya DaCosta as Cassandra Foster
In-universe information
- Occupation: Student
- Adoptive parents: Jacob Foster; Angela Hubbard
- Stepparents: Jesse Hubbard
- Siblings: Frankie Hubbard (adoptive); David Foster (adoptive); Natalia Fowler (step)
- Grandparents: Les Baxter (adoptive); Pat Baxter
- Nephews: William (adoptive)

Cassandra Foster is a fictional character on the ABC and The Online Network soap opera All My Children. On February 25, 2013, model Sal Stowers was cast as Cassandra on the Prospect Park's continuation of All My Children. The character originated in March 1997 as an infant on the now-defunct series The City, in its final days before cancellation. In 2008, Yaya DaCosta began portraying the character as a teenager from April 25, 2008, to August 25, 2008. DaCosta had placed runner-up in the third cycle of America's Next Top Model, while Stowers had won the competition in the ninth cycle of the show. Stowers made her debut on April 30, 2013.

== Storylines ==
=== 1997: The City ===
Cassandra Foster is the adopted daughter of Jacob Foster (Darnell Williams) and Angela Hubbard (Debbi Morgan), and the adopted half-sister of Frankie Hubbard (Cornelius Smith Jr.). Abandoned as an infant in 1997, Cassandra is discovered by Angie in a garbage dumpster in the SoHo district of New York City. Angie is still experiencing the loss of her foster daughter Kayla, who has been adopted by another couple. Angie falls in love with Cassandra almost immediately, and she and her then-husband Jacob adopt her.

=== 2008 ===
Following her parents' divorce, Cassandra (Yaya DaCosta) decides to spend time with her father in Paris. In 2008, Cassandra (now age 18) returns to the United States and travels to Pine Valley to meet her mother's first husband Jesse Hubbard (Darnell Williams), who was erroneously believed to have died years before Cassandra's birth. In a strange coincidence, Jesse looks almost exactly like Jacob.

Cassandra has become fast friends with Colby Chandler (Brianne Moncrief) (the daughter of her mother's former friend from high school Liza Colby (Jamie Luner)) and local musician Dre Woods (Sterling Sulieman). She plans to begin studies at Pine Valley University in the fall.

Colby become quite intoxicated at her 18th birthday party. Dre was driving Colby's car when he and Cassandra decided to bring her home. He ran over someone in the road, but was unable to determine what the object was, since it was nighttime. The next day—upon learning that Richie Novak (Billy Miller) had been struck by a car on the same road at approximately the same time—the three teenagers feared that they had inadvertently killed him. Unaware that Richie had actually been murdered earlier that evening by his sister Annie Lavery (Melissa Claire Egan), the teens vowed to keep the entire incident a secret.

However, Jesse later finds out that Dre, Colby, and Cassandra may have run over Richie. All three teenagers are taken in and questioned. Then Dre confesses that he was the one who ran over Richie. Cassandra, still in shock begins acting more and more insecure, blaming Jesse for everything, and treating Frankie better than her. She begins acting spoiled, and says Angie that she cannot be a part of the "little family" that she always wanted yet. She later books a flight to Paris to be with her father, Jacob, whom she claims is having a major surgery, and wants her to be there. Jesse later calls Jacob and he says that is just a minor gall bladder surgery and he explicitly told Cass not to come. Cassandra still says she is leaving, and apologizes to Angie and Jesse, saying that he was very nice to her, she just doesn't know how to fit into their lives yet, and after saying goodbye to Dre, she leaves for Paris.

=== 2013 ===
Jesse hints about a surprise he has for Angie, it is then revealed that Jesse had paid for Cassandra's (Sal Stowers) plane ticket to visit Pine Valley. Jesse tries to contact Cassandra, but she is not responding to his calls on April 30, 2013. It is shown that someone has destroyed her phone. Cassandra makes her first appearance as she is being handcuffed to a bed by Vlad Koslov (Alfredo Diaz). It is revealed she was taken by an imposter driver, Vlad. Later on, it is revealed that Cassandra has been captured by a human trafficking ring. Yuri Koslov (Martin Harvey) finds that Vlad has been keeping Cassandra in a separate room for his own benefits, he then demands that Cassandra be with the other girls of the ring, he then visits her and gives her an oxycodone pill to take, she does so. On May 9, 2013, Vlad forces two other girls of the ring into Cassandra's room, the girls are in worse shape than Cassandra, later on Vlad takes Cassandra away. Jesse and Zach Slater (Thorsten Kaye) are investigating into Cassandra's disappearance and find she is part of a human trafficking ring, although they rescue another girl who was found in a garbage dump. When Cassandra's captors find out (from another captive girl) that Cassandra is related to the chief of police, they initially panic but decide to turn the situation to their advantage. They contact Jesse and threaten to kill Cassandra unless he cooperates with them. Jesse insists on speaking with Cassandra to verify that they have her and that she's alive, so Yuri removes her gag long enough to allow her to scream to Jesse for help and to hear him reply that he will find her. Jesse then makes a secret deal with the traffickers in which they promise to release Cassandra in exchange for Jesse's cooperation in faking the death of Yuri Koslov. A body is found; testing reveals the teeth of the corpse match dental records for Yuri Koslov (fake dental records planted by Jesse as part of the scheme). Cassandra is dumped unconscious in the Hubbard home, where she is found by David Hayward, whose quick and skilled response saves her life. In the hospital, Cassandra says that her phone conversation with Jesse during her captivity had enabled her to believe that everything would be okay. Because Yuri had made it clear to Jesse that to reveal the secret of his faked death would mean terrible retribution against the whole family, Jesse is forced to deny that he ever spoke with Cassandra during her captivity, claiming that Cassandra must have been hallucinating—but Lea starts trying to put the pieces together. On July 1, 2013, Dr. Anders reveals that Cassandra's tests are negative to all STDs they have tested for, but he reveals to Angie and Jesse that she is pregnant.
