= Frankie Hubbard =

- All My Children character
- Cornelius Smith Jr. as Frankie
- Portrayed by: Judon Blake Foster (1984); Durrant Murphy, Jr. (1985); Z. Wright (1986–91); Alimi Ballard (1993–96); Jason Olive (2002); Cornelius Smith Jr. (2007–11)
- Duration: 1984–91; 1993–96; 2002; 2007–11
- First appearance: 1984
- Last appearance: September 23, 2011
- Created by: Wisner Washam
- Introduced by: Jacqueline Babbin
- Crossover appearances: Loving; The City
In-universe information
- Other names: Quentin (2007–08)
- Occupation: Physician
- Parents: Jesse Hubbard; Angie Hubbard
- Siblings: Natalia Fowler; Cassandra Foster (adoptive)
- Spouse: Randi Morgan (2009–)
- Children: William Saunders
- Grandparents: Lionel Hubbard; Eleanor Hubbard; Les Baxter; Pat Baxter
- Aunts and uncles: Eugene Hubbard; Teddy Baxter

Frankie Hubbard is a fictional character from the original ABC Daytime soap opera, All My Children. The character was born off-screen on October 27, 1983 and making his first on-screen appearance in early 1984; the character also appears on two other ABC soaps including, Loving and The City. Frankie is the only living child of the Daytime's first and only, African American supercouple, Jesse Hubbard and Angie Baxter. Along with his mother and former heiress Skye Chandler, he is one of only three individuals who have been regular characters on three ABC soap operas.

== Casting ==
Child actor Judon Blake Foster originated the role in early 1984 but was replaced by Durrant Murphy, Jr in early 1985. In 1986, the character was aged significantly when Z. Wright stepped into the role. Wright departed from the series in 1991 along with Debbi Morgan, the actress of Frankie's mother, Angie. In 1993, Alimi Ballard stepped into the role on Loving, first airing on August 30, 1993. After Loving's final episode in November 1995, Ballard would then carry the character over to The City last appearing in 1996. In March 2002, with new head-writer Richard Culliton at the helm, AMC releases a casting call for the role of "Frank". The show's refusal to comment on the role leads to much speculation among fans and the soap press that the character is Frankie Hubbard. Later, it is reported that Two time Emmy winner, Kevin Mambo (ex-Marcus Williams; Guiding Light) was being considered for the role of Frank. After much speculation, in May 2002, Jason Olive is cast in the role which ABC later confirms as Frankie Hubbard. The show was also looking to recast the role of Angie due to Morgan being unavailable. Olive first appeared in the role on July 22, 2002. The recast was a part of Culliton's attempt to draw from the show's then 33-year history. However, with the hiring of a new head writer, Gordon Rayfield, the role is short-lived and Frank is quickly written out with Olive making his last appearance on December 23, 2002.

On December 14, 2007, rumors began swirling that both Morgan and Williams would reprise their iconic roles in the new year. Speculation follows with fans believing that newcomer Sterling Sulieman, who had recently been introduced as the character of Dre would turn out to be Frankie. In December 2007, ABC officially announced that both Morgan and Williams would be returning to the series for long term stints. Meanwhile, Cornelius Smith Jr. appeared in the role of Quentin on December 12. On January 21, 2008, it confirmed on-screen that Quentin is actually, Frankie, using his middle name as an alias. In March 2008, Smith is upgraded to contract status. Starting in April 2009, Smith is off-screen for several weeks as his storyline takes Frankie back to Iraq. However, then head writer, Charles Pratt, Jr. confirmed that contract negotiations led to Smith's temporary departure and he finally reprised the role on June 5, 2009. Smith last appeared as Frankie in the final episode of All My Children on September 23, 2011.

== Storylines ==
=== 1983–91 ===
On October 27, 1983, recently divorced Angie Hubbard (Debbi Morgan) puts her newborn son up for adoption fearing her ex-husband Jesse (Darnell Williams) does not want the baby. However, the couple later reconcile and kidnaps their son from his adoptive family. Jesse and Angie win custody of the child and remarry in late 1983. They soon named their son Franklin Quentin Hubbard, after Jesse's late uncle—Frank Grant. Jesse is killed in 1988 leaving Angie to raise Frankie on her own. After his mother's broken engagement to Cliff Warner, Frankie and his mother relocated to California in 1991.

=== 1993–96 ===
In 1993, Angie and a now teenaged Frankie move to Corinth, Pennsylvania, near Pine Valley. Growing up without Jesse leads to Frankie falling in with the wrong crowd. After a drunken Cooper Alden hits Frankie with his car, Frankie begins blackmailing the wealthy Alden for cash. After Frankie is accused of assault, Cooper pays the man off to keep him quiet. Frankie becomes interested in film and uses it as an outlet for his anger; however, when he accidentally tapes a conversation between Detective Charles Harrison and Cooper's father, Clay, putting Clay in danger. After a brief romance, Charles and Angie marry while Frankie falls for Briana, the daughter of the troubled alcoholic, Lorraine Hawkins. Frankie is very much in love with Briana but she breaks up with him when it is discovered that Charles is actually her long lost father, leaving Frankie devastated. Later, Jesse's doppelganger, Jacob Foster puts a strain on Angie's marriage, and she and Charles later divorce. Frankie is admitted to film school moves to New York City with Jacob and Angie.

The family settles in the SoHo district of New York City. Frankie and Angie are targeted by a white supremacist group after she takes in a white foster daughter, named Kayla. However, Frankie also disagrees with his mother's decision, believing there were more African-American children in need of a home. Frankie also gets involved in the Back to Africa movement. While someone plants a bomb in front of Angie's clinic, Frankie becomes the victim of another intentional bombing at a local bar. Jacob is there to support them. Frankie decides to go back to California to attend film school and gives Jacob and Angie his blessing before leaving. He returns in 1996 for Angie and Jacob's wedding and reveals that he and Briana are dating again. He also gets a new sister when Angie and Jacob adopt a daughter, Cassandra.

=== 2002 ===
Frank returns to Pine Valley in the summer of 2002 fresh out of medical school. Longtime family friends, Doctors Joe and Jake Martin hired Frank as an intern at Pine Valley Hospital. Frank begins dating Simone Torres and also reconnects with a former lover, Mia Saunders who reveals that she gave birth to his son, William and put the boy up for adoption. Mia's fiancé, Jake convinces Frank to let the child be happy with his adoptive parents. Frank and Simone's romance is destroyed after she discovers a tape from Frank's days as a documentary filmmaker; Frank's documentary features Simone's homeless brother, Anthony McMillan overdosing on drugs. But instead of trying to help save Anthony's life, Frank filmed his death instead. A disgusted Simone dumps Frank and he drops off the canvas in December 2002.

=== 2007–11 ===
In December 2007, the mysterious "Quentin" assists Aidan Devane in finding the missing Greenlee Smythe and Zach Slater. Greenlee and Quentin both contract a mystery disease and are near death when Dr. Angela Hubbard returns to Pine Valley to consult on the case and is shocked to see that Quentin is actually her baby boy, Frankie. As Frankie makes a slow recovery, he receives a visit from Jesse, and it is believed that he is hallucinating; however, Jesse reveals himself and explains that he was forced to fake his death to keep his family safe. When Frankie returns to Pine Valley Hospital to finish his internship, he and Colby Chandler are kidnapped by his father's captor, the mysterious Papel who is eventually revealed to be Tad Martin's uncle, Rob Gardner. Rob wreaks havoc on the Hubbard family at Angie and Jesse's wedding before he is sent to prison. In 2008, Frankie falls for a prostitute, Randi Morgan who is being abused by her pimp, Fletcher Parks. Frankie even attempts to buy Randi's freedom, but Fletcher refuses; however, they are relieved when Fletcher ends up dead, and they decide to move in together. Later a teenage Cassandra leaves town feeling that she doesn't belong. Soon after, it is discovered that Jesse had a daughter, Natalia while he was away. Frankie is soon reunited with fellow soldiers, Taylor Thompson and Brot Monroe and in early 2009, Frankie learns he must go back to Iraq. Randi is terrified but to assure her that he will be fine they marry on March 24, 2009. Frankie is injured during an explosion in May 2009 and returns home soon after getting surgery on his hands in Germany. Frankie being injured puts a strain on the marriage but he soon recovers. Meanwhile, Randi learns she is pregnant but their happiness is interrupted when Randi's former lover, District Attorney, Henry North ends up dead and she miscarries. In the meantime, Frankie befriends Henry's widow, Madison North it is soon revealed that Madison killed her husband and let Randi take the blame for it. Furious at his wife and father for keeping secrets, Frankie moves out and begins getting closer to Madison and drinking. Randi mistakenly believes they are having an affair, but Frankie assures her that nothing happened between them and they reconcile. However, Madison slowly starts to lose her grip on reality and tries to blackmail Frankie into divorcing Randi but when he refuses, she attempts suicide only for Frankie to revive her. Frankie later helps Madison get away from her abusive father and they eventually put the past behind them. However, Randi remains insecure about their friendship even when Madison begins dating Ryan Lavery and Frankie is protective of her.

When Randi is hired as the spokesmodel for Fusion Cosmetics forcing her out of town frequently, Frankie leans on Madison. Meanwhile, the Hubbards clash with the new chief of staff, David Hayward who has severely cut Frankie's hours and forced a blind Angie out of her job as chief of staff. Frankie longs to have another child, but Randi rejects the idea due to her modeling career. Frankie & Randi manage to rebuild their marriage while supporting Madison who learns she is pregnant with Ryan's child. In early 2011, Frankie became a big brother again with the birth of his little sister, Lucy. At the same time, Frankie befriends the teenage Maya Mercado who is mourning her decision to give up her newborn baby. Frankie later recommends Maya as Lucy's nanny and it is eventually revealed that Lucy is the child Maya gave up. Angie's real baby, Ellie was stillborn and Jesse finds an abandoned Lucy and gives her to his wife. Despite the tragic loss, the family finds several reasons to celebrate including Angie regaining her eyesight, Brot and Natalia announcing their engagement, and Maya choosing to live with Hubbards so Angie can be near Lucy. In September 2011, Frankie & Randi attend the party at the Chandler mansion where Randi hints that she may be pregnant.

== See also ==
- Jesse Hubbard and Angie Baxter
- The Hubbard Family
