= New York Hot Tracks =

- Starring: Carlos DeJesus (1983-1986); Debbi Morgan (1986-1989); Darnell Williams (1986-1989); Gene Anthony Ray (1989)
- Country of origin: United States

Production
- Running time: 44 minutes

Original release
- Network: WABC-TV (New York)
- Release: July 22, 1983 – 1989

New York Hot Tracks was a syndicated music television series which aired from 1983 to 1989 and achieved the number one music variety show spot in the United States. Hot Tracks was executive produced and syndicated by M.K. Thomas & Company of Chicago in association with WABC-TV, New York. The 44-minute weekly series was distributed to more than 110 markets across the country. The show debuted on July 22, 1983, a full week before NBC's Friday Night Videos. The original host was WKTU disc jockey Carlos DeJesus, who introduced the videos from various locations in and around New York City, usually dance nightclubs.

Many in the music world would venture to New York, and when they did, Hot Tracks was a popular place to visit. Many music stars actually co-hosted the show when they were in New York. The list included Tina Turner, Madonna, Beastie Boys, Run-DMC, Anita Baker, David Bowie, Aretha Franklin, and Janet Jackson. This attracted the attention of many national sponsors who supported the show. The executive producers were Michelle K. Thomas, CEO of the M. K. Thomas & Company, along with Brooke Johnson, V.P. of Programming at WABC-TV. The show was released weekly by David Novarro and Vincent Rubino.

From 1986 to 1989, Hot Tracks was hosted by Debbi Morgan and Darnell Williams, who concurrently portrayed Angie and Jesse Hubbard on the ABC soap opera All My Children. During this period, the show led as number one in all significant ratings categories according to the A.C. Nielsen Company, November, 1987.

The third and final host of Hot Tracks was Gene Anthony Ray, from the motion picture Fame and the television series it spawned.

Ultimately, the program was canceled late in 1989 by its syndicator, M. K. Thomas & Company of Chicago, after having grown from airing in New York only to more than 110 television stations around the United States and off-shore. Program masters are current property of KHEMETCOM Entertainment & Omnimercial Media, which purchased assets of the M.K. Thomas & Company in 1997.
