= Aidan Devane =

- All My Children character
- Portrayed by: Aiden Turner; Tom Archdeacon (temp. 2004)
- Duration: 2002–2009
- First appearance: June 6, 2002
- Last appearance: December 21, 2009
- Created by: Richard Culliton
- Introduced by: Jean Dadario Burke
In-universe information
- Occupation: Private Detective; Spy for Jackson Montgomery; Valley Inn bartender Construction worker Special Forces operative
- Mother: Lindsay Devane
- Spouse: Greenlee Smythe (2008–2009)
- Grandfathers: Thomas Devane
- Uncles: Fredrick Devane; Gabriel Devane
- Aunts: Alex Marick; Anna Devane
- First cousins: Robin Scorpio; Peter August; Leora Hayward; Emma Drake; Noah Drake (once removed)

Aidan Devane is a fictional character from the ABC soap opera All My Children. He has been portrayed by Aiden Turner, from June 6, 2002, to December 21, 2009. The character has also been temporarily portrayed by actor Tom Archdeacon, from May 13 to 28, 2004, for six episodes.

== Storylines ==
Aidan comes to Pine Valley in 2002 after his aunt Anna Devane, a former resident of Port Charles (the fictional town in which the ABC daytime drama General Hospital takes place), comes to town. He is in "Special Ops" in his native United Kingdom, and not much is known about him at first. He uses such training to spy on other Pine Valley residents for Jackson Montgomery and Ryan Lavery. Aidan was a soldier while in his home country. He is a Jack-of-all-trades: a construction worker on Erica Kane's penthouse after a fire guts it, and a bartender at the Valley Inn. Aidan becomes partners in a private investigators office with Tad Martin.

Greenlee Smythe is set up by Kendall Hart Slater for the almost-kidnapping of her son, Spike Lavery, because Greenlee got away with kidnapping him the first time in July 2007. At Greenlee's arraignment, Aidan orchestrates a diversion so that he can help Greenlee escape prison time. The two go on the run, heading towards the Canada–US border. When the PVPD discovers Aidan and Greenlee's location, Aidan insists for Greenlee to continue to the border without him. At this time, both Greenlee and Aidan proclaim their love for one another and promise each other that they will have the life they both wished for, before parting ways. Later, after being arrested, Aidan is released in order to help search of the missing Greenlee and Zach Slater. While five weeks pass, and in a weak moment, he has sex with a grieving Kendall in an isolated cabin. With the discovery of the blueprints of an underground bomb shelter, Aidan and Kendall are able to save Greenlee and Zach with the help of a young man calling himself Quentin, better known as Frankie Hubbard.

Greenlee soon becomes sick; a mysterious woods-related infection has stricken her. Aidan, Jack and others all pray at Pine Valley Hospital for Angie Baxter Hubbard to save the lives of Greenlee and Frankie.

At the hospital, Greenlee is revived after Aidan confesses his love for her. While both Greenlee and Zach are in better health again, Kendall and Aidan decide to keep their night together a secret. During her hospital stay, Aidan tells Greenlee how much he loves her and brings her the stuffed tiger she named "Alfonso" that Aidan bought for her after he accidentally broke her rib performing the Heimlich maneuver. Greenlee is discharged from Pine Valley Hospital and both she and Aidan are thrilled to finally start the life they dreamed of for so long. Aidan promises Greenlee that he will always be there for her and to protect her. However, Aidan feels very guilty over his grief sex with Kendall.

Aidan proposes to Greenlee in a romantic beach picnic, one that resembles their first date. She initially declines his proposal, only because she is enjoying what they have in the moment. When Aidan almost breaks things off with Greenlee, she realizes how much she loves him and wants to marry him. After trying to win him back, the two are engaged to married. Just when things are blissfully happy for the couple, Zach Slater sends Aidan on a rescue mission to Darfur to get a doctor out. Turns out to be Dr. Jake Martin. Aidan courageously goes to Darfur to rescue Jake, and they both successfully return to Pine Valley.

Greenlee and Aidan want to move up their wedding date to June and not waste another moment. However, during Jesse and Angie's wedding, Greenlee finds out from her father about Aidan and Kendall's one-night stand. She silently keeps quiet until deciding the perfect moment to reveal to Aidan and Kendall that she knows. She refuses to accept the given explanation. Over time, Greenlee attempts to mend things with Aidan; however, only as friends. Aidan initially opposes to it because he is in love with her and wants to marry her, but he later realizes he would rather be her friend and still be in her life than have nothing at all. The two agree to be friends, but it is obvious to the both of them that they are more than just friends. Aidan sets out to win Greenlee back and remains persistent to ask her for her forgiveness and give their love one more chance. After showing up at her apartment to tell her he still loves her by using flashcards, Greenlee once again sees how much she wants to be with Aidan. She later asks Aidan to come over to her place and says that she forgives him, using flashcards as he did with her. The two give their love another chance, and Greenlee asks Aidan to take their relationship slow so she can earn back her trust in him. Greenlee then goes out for sailing to sort her feelings out for Aidan and gets into an accident. After recovering from her boating accident, her accident makes her realize how much she wants her relationship with Aidan and she and Aidan resume their romance up to where it was before and make love. The couple are very much in love and happy to be back together again.

On August 14, 2008, while on a trip to Vegas, Aidan and Greenlee decide to get married because they do not want to lose what they have. While they are getting married Kendall, Zach, Ryan and Annie Lavery crash the wedding. On their honeymoon, Greenlee, who was affected by a tainted bottle of Bella, tells Aidan that she wants Ryan's baby. To find out what was really going on, he plants a bug in her earrings which confirms his suspicions of Greenlee still being in love with Ryan. He tells her that he can no longer fight for her and leaves. Afterwards, he tells a construction team to stop working on the house he was having built for Greenlee and shows up at Ryan's with a gun.

On November 11, 2008, it is revealed that Aidan has been helping Annie stage the kidnapping of her daughter. He was the one who pretended to kidnap Annie from the warehouse and shot her in the arm. Their intentions appear to be trying to get Ryan and Greenlee back.

In mid-2009, Aidan helps shelter Kendall after she is framed for the murder of Stuart Chandler. When the crisis is resolved, Aidan kidnaps Kendall with the intent to ruin her life in retribution for Greenlee's death, which Kendall was indirectly responsible for. He is later confronted by Zach, who nearly shoots him before Kendall talks him out of it, and subsequently arrested. Though he knows it means nothing, Aidan apologizes, stating that he never meant for events to turn out like they had and he has indeed changed for the worse since Greenlee's accident, and explaining that he wanted to make Kendall feel the same pain he did. He goes on to say that he does not care what the police will do to him, shouting, "Whatever happens to me is fine, because I'm just fed up with Pine Valley anyway. There's too much flippin' drama!". He is subsequently taken off to prison.
