= Alimi Ballard =

American actor

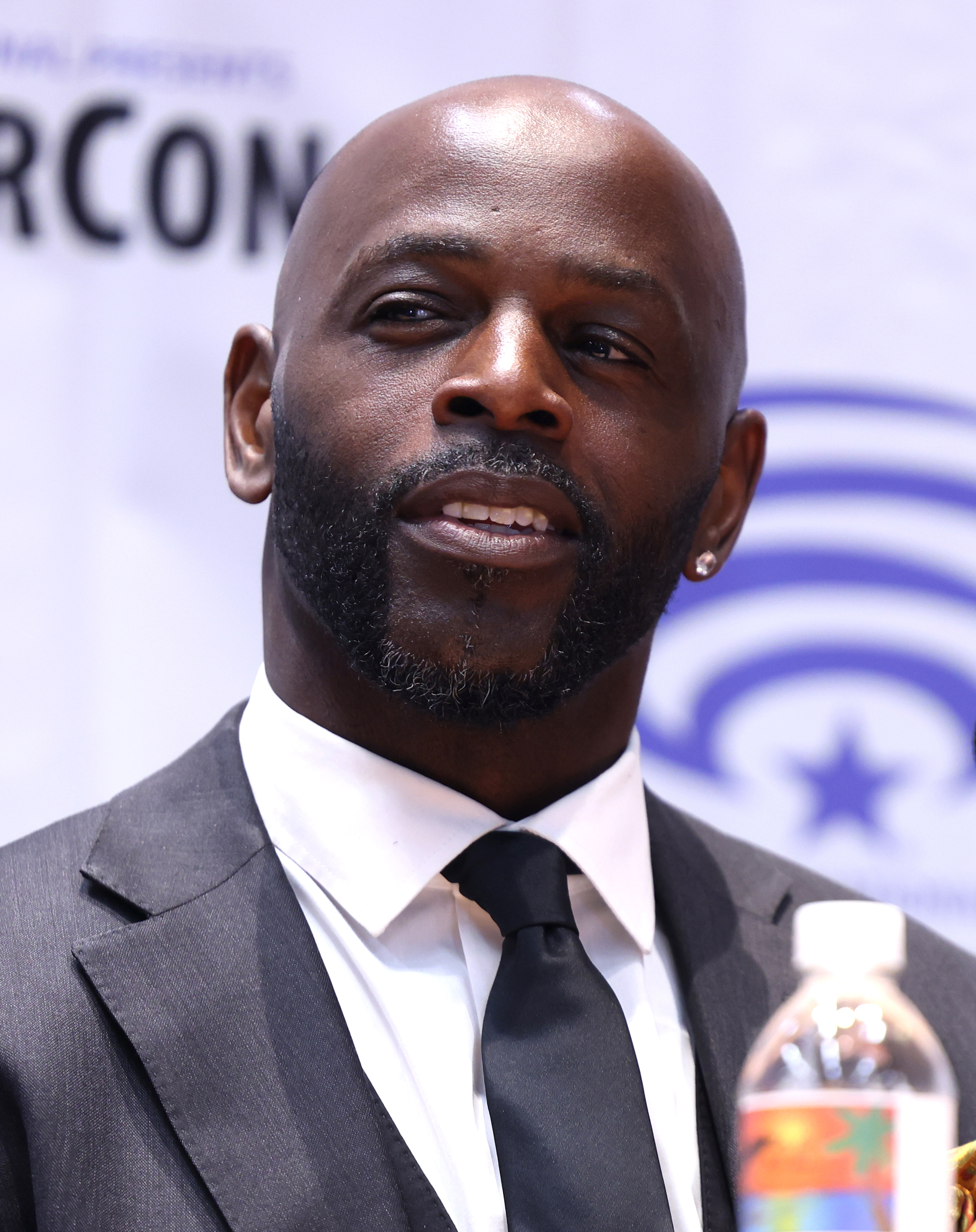
- Ballard in 2025
- Born: October 17, 1972 (age 53) or October 17, 1977 (age 48) (Note: Multiple sources give Ballard's birthday as October 17, but sources conflict on whether he was born in 1973 or 1977.); New York City, New York, US
- Occupation: Actor
- Years active: 1992–present
- Spouse: Dahn Elle Dior Ballard
- Children: 2

Alimi Ballard (born October 17, 1972 or 1977) is an American television actor. He is best known for his role as FBI agent David Sinclair on the CBS police procedural thriller Numb3rs (2005–2010), as well as the Quizmaster from Sabrina the Teenage Witch.

== Early life ==
Ballard was born and grew up in a working-class area of the Bronx with his mother and older sisters. He knew he wanted to become an actor.

Ballard began acting in high school. He attended Mind-Builders Creative Arts Center in Northeast Bronx and participated in their Positive Youth Troupe Theater (PYT) program.

== Career ==
=== Film ===
Ballard was in Deep Impact (1998), Men of Honor (2000), Three Days of Rain (2002), Black Cloud (2005), and Fast Five (2011).

=== Television ===
From 1993 to 1996, Ballard portrayed Frankie Hubbard (son of All My Children supercouple Jesse and Angie) on the ABC daytime soap opera Loving and its successor series The City. In 1997, he was a regular cast member on the short-lived ABC sitcom Arsenio, which starred Arsenio Hall and Vivica A. Fox. He also portrayed Quizmaster Albert on the ABC/WB series Sabrina, the Teenage Witch (1997–99) and Herbal on the Fox series Dark Angel (2000–01).

From 2005 to 2010, Ballard co-starred in the CBS police procedural thriller, Numb3rs, as David Sinclair. From 2009 to 2011, Ballard portrayed the voice of Falcon in the animated series, The Super Hero Squad Show. In 2011, Ballard played Fusco in Fast Five. He also guest-starred as Special Agent Gayne Levin on another CBS procedural, NCIS. This guest role reunited him with Michael Weatherly, who previously co-starred with Ballard on three series: Loving, The City, and Dark Angel. From 2012 to 2015, he played a recurring role on CSI: Crime Scene Investigation as Officer Crawford, a newly promoted detective, after appearing in season 3 as a music producer. He also guest starred on NYPD Blue, American Dreams, Rizzoli & Isles, Drop Dead Diva, Castle, and Bones.

In 2015, Ballard was cast opposite Mireille Enos in the ABC legal thriller, The Catch, leaving after the first season. In 2026, Ballard was cast as William Baines on the ABC soap opera General Hospital. Scenes concerning his debut aired on September 3 of the same year.

== Personal life ==
Ballard and his wife Dahn Ballard have two children.

== Filmography ==
=== Film ===
Year	Title	Role	Director(s)	Notes
1998	Deep Impact	Bobby Rhue	Mimi Leder	Science fiction disaster film
2000	Before Now	Jay	Chrys Yvette	Short film
2000	Men of Honor	Coke	George Tillman Jr.	Drama film
2001	Automatic	David Blake	William 'Jamaal' Fort	Thriller film
2002	Three Days of Rain	Derrick	Michael Meredith	Drama film
2003	Studio City	Leonard Alworth	Tom Verica	Short film
2004	Black Cloud	Dusty	Rick Schroder	Drama film
2011	Fast Five	Fusco	Justin Lin	Action film
2011	Interception	Joe	Jason Neudecker	Short film Also executive producer
2013	Present Trauma	Tom	Mark Manalo	Short film
2013	The Insomniac	Officer Flores	Monty Miranda	Whodunit psychological thriller film
2014	Lost Angels	Nathaniel	Stan Harrington	Musical drama film
2015	Touched	B.R.	Terrance Tykeem	Drama film
2017	Call Me King	Dwight	R.L. Scott	Crime drama film
2017	Smokd	Juror #5	Tamika Miller	Short film
2019	Kill Chain	The Curious Assassin	Ken Sanzel	Neo-noir crime thriller film

=== Television ===
Year	Title	Role	Notes
1993–95	Loving	Frankie Hubbard	Main cast
1995	New York Undercover	Kalim	Episode: "Private Enemy No. 1"
1995–96	The City	Frankie Hubbard	Main cast
1997	Arsenio	Matthew Deveaux	Main cast
1997–98	Sabrina, the Teenage Witch	Albert the Quizmaster	Main cast (season 2)
1999	Malcolm & Eddie	Duke Gibson	Episode: "Daddio"
2000	Nash Bridges	Shane West	Episode: "Liar's Poker"
2000	Little Richard	Guest	Made for-TV movie directed by Robert Townsend
2000	NYPD Blue	Marcus Potter	Episode: "Lucky Luciano"
2000–01	Dark Angel	Herbal Thought	Main cast (season 1)
2002	Philly	Dwight Thomas	Episode: "Ripley, Believe It or Not"
2002	The Division	Ethan Pasterfield	Episode: "Unfamiliar Territory"
2003	She Spies	Kelly Sawyer	Episode: "We'll Be Right Back"
2003	Boomtown	Young Marvin Lloyd	Episode: "The Hole-in-the-Wall Gang"
2003	CSI: Crime Scene Investigation	Music Producer	Episode: "Lady Heather's Box"
2004	American Dreams	Jamal	Recurring cast: Season 2
2005–10	Numb3rs	David Sinclair	Main cast
2009–11	The Super Hero Squad Show	Falcon (voice)	Main cast
2011	NCIS	Special Agent Gayne Levin	Recurring cast (season 8)
2012	In Plain Sight	Eddie Fredericks/Eddie Williams	Episode: "Reservations, I've Got a Few"
2012	Rizzoli & Isles	Cliff	Episode: "What Doesn't Kill You"
2012	Drop Dead Diva	Jack Dillingham	Episode: "Winning Ugly"
2012	Hollywood Heights	Det. Ferrantino	Recurring cast (season 2)
2012–15	CSI: Crime Scene Investigation	Detective Kevin Crawford	Recurring cast (seasons 13–15)
2013	Bones	FBI Agent James	Episode: "The Secret in the Siege"
2013	Melissa & Joey	Paul Wagner	Episode: "Inside Job"
2013	Hello Ladies	Armand	Episode: "The Dinner"
2014	Scorpion	Co-Pilot	Episode: "Pilot"
2014	Santa Con	Steve Repperton	Made for-TV movie directed by Melissa Joan Hart
2015	Castle	Frank Jackson	Episode: "Castle, P.I."
2016	The Catch	Reginald Lennox III	Main cast (season 1)
2016	Criminal Minds	Desmond Holt	Episode: "Mirror Image"
2017	Lucifer	Dr. Liam Garrity	Episode: "God Johnson"
2017	Queen Sugar	Dr. Robert Dubois	Recurring cast (season 2)
2018	Do It Better	Darren	Episode: "Day One"
2018	Elementary	Don Kohler	Episode: "Once You've Ruled Out God"
2018	The Good Doctor	Mara's Father	Episode: "Middle Ground"
2018	Mom	Professor Gannon	Episode: "Pork Loin and a Beat Up Monte Carlo"
2019	S.W.A.T.	Officer Thompson	Episode: "Fallen"
2019	Doom Patrol	Joshua Clay	2 episodes
2019	The Resident	Detective Raines	Episode: "Saints & Sinners"
2019–21	Queen of the South	Marcel Dumas	Recurring cast (seasons 4–5)
2020	All Rise	Niles Allen	Episode: "What The Constitution Greens to Me"
2020	NCIS: Los Angeles	AUSA Allan Williams	Episode: "Missing Time"
2021	Animal Kingdom	Phoenix	Episode: "Family Business" & "Home Sweet Home"
2021–22	One of Us Is Lying	Kevin Clay	Recurring cast (season 1); Main cast (season 2)
2022	The Rookie	Langston Bryant	Episode: "Fight or Flight"
2024–25	Law & Order	Defense Attorney Ron Delahunt	3 episodes
2026	General Hospital	William Baines	Recurring role

=== Video games ===
Year	Title	Role	Note
2009	Marvel Super Hero Squad	Falcon (voice)	
2010	Marvel Super Hero Squad: The Infinity Gauntlet	Falcon (voice)	
2011	Marvel Super Hero Squad: Comic Combat	Falcon (voice)	
2011	Marvel Super Hero Squad Online	Falcon, Miles Morales / Spider-Man (voice)	
