= Arsenio (TV series) =

American television sitcom

- Genre: Sitcom
- Created by: David S. Rosenthal
- Written by: Randall Balsmeyer; David S. Rosenthal
- Directed by: John Fortenberry; Thomas Schlamme
- Starring: Arsenio Hall; Vivica A. Fox; Kevin Dunn; Shawnee Smith; Alimi Ballard
- Composers: Starr Parodi; Jeff Eden Fair
- Country of origin: United States
- Original language: English
- No. of seasons: 1
- No. of episodes: 7

Production
- Executive producers: Arsenio Hall; Bruce Rasmussen; David S. Rosenthal
- Producers: Lisa Albert; Mark Brull; Lester Lewis; David Raether
- Running time: 30 minutes
- Production companies: David Rosenthal Productions; Arsenio Hall Communications; DreamWorks Television

Original release
- Network: ABC
- Release: March 5 – April 23, 1997

Arsenio is an American television sitcom that aired on ABC. The series starred Arsenio Hall and Vivica A. Fox. It aired from March 5 to April 23, 1997, with a total of 7 episodes produced.

== Synopsis ==
Set in Atlanta, Georgia, Hall starred as Michael Atwood, the host of a sports cable show on ASTV in Atlanta. Michael is also newly married man with his lawyer wife Vivian Deveaux Atwood (Vivica A. Fox). His co-host is Al (Kevin Dunn), who Michael sometimes asks for advice on his home life. Living with Michael and Vicki, is Vicki's younger brother Matthew (Alimi Ballard), a Harvard graduate who is not ready to take on the real world. Shawnee Smith also co-starred as Vicki's free-spirited old college friend Laura who is always encouraging Vicki to let loose.

== Cast ==
- Arsenio Hall as Michael Atwood, the host of a cable sports television network
- Vivica A. Fox as Vivian Deveaux-Atwood, a brilliant and dedicated attorney at a major law firm in the Georgia capital and Michael's wife
- Kevin Dunn as Al O'Brien, Michael's co-anchor and good friend
- Shawnee Smith as Laura Lauman, Vivian's best friend from college; a free-spirit
- Alimi Ballard as Matthew Deveaux, Vivian's younger brother

== History ==
Arsenio was one of six shows produced by DreamWorks Television in the lead up to the launch of the more successful DreamWorks Pictures, which started releasing movies in September 1997 with The Peacemaker. It was a mid-season show for ABC, premiering in March 1997. On April 2, 1997, it was announced that the show was going to be pulled from ABC's schedule later that month. When this announcement was made, DreamWorks Television and ABC were in talks to retool Arsenio for the 1997–98 television season (which was starting in September 1997). However, this never eventuated.

In February 2006, Viacom (now known as Paramount Skydance) purchased the rights to Arsenio and all other television shows and live-action movies DreamWorks produced since their inception.

== Episodes ==
No.	Title	Directed by	Written by	Original release date	Prod. code
1	"Overtime"	Thomas Schlamme	David S. Rosenthal	March 5, 1997	101
2	"Secrets and Lies"	Unknown	Unknown	March 12, 1997	104
3	"Lisa's First Script"	Unknown	Unknown	March 19, 1997	102
4	"We Can Still Be Friends"	Unknown	Unknown	March 26, 1997	106
5	"Show Me the Money"	John Fortenberry	Lester Lewis	April 2, 1997	105
6	"Throw Momma From the House"	Thomas Schlamme	Bruce Rasmussen	April 9, 1997	103
7	"Mike's Nightmare"	Unknown	Unknown	April 23, 1997	107
