= Teresa Blake =

American actress and model

- Born: Tuscaloosa, Alabama, U.S.
- Occupations: Actress; model
- Years active: 1984–1998
- Spouse: Mike McGuire (m. 1994; div. 1998)

Teresa Blake (born December 12) is an American actress and model. She is best known for playing the role of Gloria Marsh on the ABC soap opera All My Children (1991 to 1998).

== Early life ==
Blake was born and raised in Tuscaloosa, Alabama. After her parents divorced, her mother worked at the county courthouse and held down second jobs for years to support Blake and her three brothers. Blake's mother later remarried and had another son.

Blake was in the choir in high school. She has described herself at that time as a rebel. She had never been anywhere except Tuscaloosa and Northport, Alabama, but she set big goals for herself.

== Career ==
After high school, Blake entered a modeling contest sponsored by Hawaiian Tropic suntan lotion. She won the regional title and traveled to Daytona Beach, Florida, where she won on the national and international level. She was sent to Hawaii to pose for an ad. A Miami-based modeling agent saw the ad and convinced her to move there.

Blake landed print and commercial modeling jobs. She was cast in a recurring role on Miami Vice, playing a love interest for Don Johnson. She appeared in the TV movie Nasty Hero. She also had an uncredited role in Revenge of the Nerds II: Nerds in Paradise.

After five years in Miami, Blake decided to try other opportunities in Los Angeles. She appeared in the films Licence to Kill and It Had to Be You. She guest starred on B.L. Stryker and had a role in the TV movie Roxanne: The Prize Pulitzer. In 1990, Blake played Christy in the film Payback. She appeared in music videos for Billy Idol and Julio Iglesias.

Blake was cast as Gloria Marsh on the ABC soap opera All My Children, first airing in October 1991. She appeared in a short film, The Secret, directed by Conal O'Brian. She also starred in a short film, Holy Mr. Herbert, directed by Joe Plonsky.

Blake left All My Children. Her final airdate was January 22, 1998.

== Personal life ==
Blake dated Mike McGuire, drummer for the country western band Shenandoah, while they were in high school. They reconnected years later and started a relationship. They were married on July 9, 1994. They divorced in 1998.

== Filmography ==
=== Film ===
| Year | Title | Role | Notes |
|---|---|---|---|
| 1987 | Revenge of the Nerds II: Nerds in Paradise | | Uncredited role |
| 1989 | Licence to Kill | Ticket Agent | |
| 1989 | It Had to Be You | | |
| 1990 | Payback | Christy | |
| 1993 | The Secret | | Short film |

=== Television ===
| Year | Title | Role | Notes |
|---|---|---|---|
| 1986; 1988 | Miami Vice | Blonde; Donna | 2 episodes |
| 1987 | Nasty Hero | Virginia | Television film |
| 1989 | Roxanne: The Prize Pulitzer | Party Guest | Television film |
| 1989 | B.L. Stryker | April | Episode: "The King of Jazz" |
| 1991–1998 | All My Children | Gloria Marsh Chandler | Contract role |
