= Haidee Granger =

American TV producer

Haidee S. Granger is an English and American TV producer, writer, executive and media consultant.

== Early life and career ==
Born in South Africa and raised both there and in London, Granger studied art and worked for a time as an animation artist. Granger opened and ran Granada TV's American operations. Later, as VP of Time-Life Films, she was responsible for all co-productions with the BBC. One of Granger's projects with Time-Life and the BBC was the historical aviation documentary Reaching for the Skies, which she produced in 1987. It aired on the BBC the following year, and was subsequently re-packaged for American cable network TNT for broadcast in 1989. The version that aired on TNT featured narration by Robert Vaughn, which substituted the English-accented voiceover heard on the BBC version.

== ABC's Loving ==
In the early 1990s, Granger relocated to the United States when she became a network executive at ABC. She was asked to replace vacating executive producer Fran Sears on the network's lowest rated daytime serial, Loving. The first Loving episode under Granger's watch aired on Tuesday, May 26, 1992.

After a falling out between Granger and the head writer left from the Sears era, Addie Walsh, Loving went several months without a replacement head writer. This had an adverse effect on stories which were starting to show new promise for Loving. It was Granger who acted as head writer during that time. Paul Anthony Stewart, who played Casey Bowman from just before Granger's arrival in 1992 until 1995, cited that "Loving has great potential, and the cast really works hard. But we were without a head writer for so long that we suffered from a lack of follow-through with some storylines. Haidee [Granger] has worked hard to develop the characters and make them more interesting. And she is really receptive to suggestions, which makes it easier for the actors to embrace the characters. She is absolutely committed to the success of the show."

In the fall of 1992, Granger brought back writer Millee Taggart (who had previously acted as head writer from 1988 to 1991), to pair up with Robert Guza, Jr. as the new head writing team. In October 1993, after 17 months of turbulency at Loving, Granger was fired from the position because the show hardly rose from its last position in the daytime ratings. She was replaced by JoAnn Emmerich, ABC's Vice President of Daytime Programming.

== Later ventures ==
Granger was hired at CBS Studios International in the mid-1980s and later produced a series on sports for the international market and a number of programs for the home video market. Prior to entering real estate, she ran her own boutique media and production company with clients in the Fortune 500. Granger helped negotiate the ITT purchase of WBIS from the city of New York and was chosen to help launch and run the station.
