= The City (1995 TV series) =

American television soap opera

- Genre: Soap opera
- Created by: Agnes Nixon; Barbara Esensten; James Harmon Brown
- Starring: Series cast
- Theme music composer: Scott Schreer
- Country of origin: United States
- No. of seasons: 2
- No. of episodes: 352

Production
- Executive producer: Jean Dadario Burke
- Production location: New York City
- Running time: 30 minutes
- Production company: Dramatic Creations

Original release
- Network: ABC
- Release: November 13, 1995 – March 28, 1997

Related
- Loving; Port Charles; All My Children; One Life to Live; General Hospital

The City is an American television soap opera that aired on ABC from November 13, 1995, to March 28, 1997. The series was a continuation of the serial Loving, which ran from 1983 until 1995, and featured the surviving central characters of the latter's final major story arc, which saw most of the show's characters fall victim to a serial killer. The characters that survived moved from Corinth, Pennsylvania, to New York City and settled in the Manhattan neighborhood of SoHo.

The show was co-created by Agnes Nixon, the creator of Loving, and the show's last pair of headwriters, Barbara Esensten and James Harmon Brown. The show won two Daytime Emmy Awards in 1996.

== Storylines ==
While it was started by Loving creator Agnes Nixon, The City was different from other soaps of its day, as the city wasn't the main setting of the series: the loft and its surroundings took precedence, and the city was secondary. Also, the show was shot on videotape using the Film look process for its entire run (one of two soap operas ever to do so, All My Children also used the FilmLook processing from 2006 to 2010).

One of the most daring storylines was one involving a transsexual. Photographer Bernardo had a one night stand with model Azure C. He went to the corner to get some orange juice when he saw a picture of Azure C. before the gender affirming surgery. The modeling agency which they both worked had to do a lot of damage control. The storyline began to take off but was soon dropped, in part due to the subject matter, protests from transgender rights groups who felt that the storyline presented trans people as a source of mockery, and in part due to lackluster reaction to actress Carlotta Chang's performance. Azure and Bernardo reconciled and left town.

Despite featuring several well-known actors, such as Morgan Fairchild and Debbi Morgan, the series failed to catch on. In an attempt to remind viewers of the well-received "Loving Murders" storyline from Loving, in mid-1996 the show had most of the characters stalked (and some murdered by) a killer known as "The Masquerader," who left notes saying "Happy Now". The killer was revealed to be Danny's girlfriend Molly Malone, whose sweet, perky behavior belied her true nature.

Several months later, Lorraine, who had dazzled critics and fans in the final months of Loving, joined the show. She had left her long-lost love Charles (Angie's ex-husband) and took up with fellow middle-aged alcoholic Nick Rivers. Rivers shared a past with Sydney Chase and there were plans to team the two up (Fairchild and Nick's portrayer, Roscoe Born, had palpable chemistry a decade earlier in ABC's short-lived prime time soap Paper Dolls) but the plans never materialized.

=== The end ===
Morgan Fairchild had only signed a one-year contract and left when that contract expired in late 1996. ABC replaced her with Jane Elliot, who was very popular as the witchy Tracy Quartermaine on General Hospital (Elliot had previously helped produce Loving from 1994 to 1995). Four months prior to her arrival, Elliot reprised her role on General Hospital for the summer to cross over on The City in the fall. However, despite Elliot's addition to the show, ratings continued to be the lowest of any daytime soap opera and ABC announced the program's cancellation in February 1997.

Two months after the show's finale, after airing classic episodes of ABC's other soaps (All My Children, One Life to Live, and General Hospital) in The City's time slot, ABC would replace the show with Port Charles, which remained until October 2003. The show did provide happy endings for most of its characters but when they failed to get Morgan Fairchild to appear again as Sydney Chase, the show killed her off by the "Happy Now" killer. Daytime talk show The View used Sydney Chase's loft set from The City until its fifth season.

== Cast ==
The original characters of the show included the survivors of the murder storyline on Loving, including Ally Alden (played by Laura Wright), Steffi Brewster (Amelia Heinle), Alex Masters (Randolph Mantooth), Angie Hubbard (Debbi Morgan), Tess Wilder (Catherine Hickland), Buck Huston (Philip Brown), Danny Roberts (Ted King), Jocelyn Roberts (Lisa Lo Cicero), Jacob Foster (Darnell Williams), Frankie Hubbard (Alimi Ballard), Richard Wilkins (Corey Page), and Tony Soleito (George Palermo). Among the original characters there were Zoey (Joni Allen), Nick Rivers (Roscoe Born), Joey Soleito (James Sioutis), Bernard Castro (Philip Anthony-Rodriguez), Sydney Chase (Morgan Fairchild), Azure C (Carlotta Chang), and Molly Malone (Melissa Dye).

Angie Hubbard and her son Frankie were characters that originated in the early 1980s on All My Children, and were transplanted to Loving in 1993. Thus, with the premiere of The City in 1995, Angie and Frankie became the first two individuals who have been regular characters on three ABC soap operas. Likewise, Angie's portrayer Debbi Morgan became the first actor to portray the same character as a regular on three different soap operas.

Characters from Loving, Cooper Alden (Michael Weatherly) and Deborah Alden (Nancy Addison) made brief appearances at the start of the series. By 1996, several original cast members had already left the series, including Anthony-Rodriguez, Ballard, Chang, Dye, Fairchild, and Heinle. To refresh the cast, and substitute Fairchild's departure, the show welcomed Tracy Quartermaine (a General Hospital character, played by Jane Elliot) to the show. Other new characters included Dillon Quartermaine (also from GH, played by P.J. Aliseo), Jared Chase (Joel Fabiani), Carla Soleito (Amy Van Horne), Gino Soleito (Al Martino, Joseph Sirola) and Lorraine Hawkins (Maggie Rush) who was also on Loving towards the end of the show.

== Ratings history ==
The City fared poorly from the beginning, ranking last out of 11 soaps and averaging a 2.2 rating for the majority of the 1995–96 television season (Loving had left the air averaging a 2.5 rating between the months of September and November 1995). The ratings dropped to 2.0 for the 1996–97 television season, and producers tried to gain viewers by crossing over Jane Elliot's popular General Hospital character Tracy Quartermaine, who first appeared in October 1996. The City ranked last out of 11 soap operas on the air as late as the first week of January 1997 even below newcomer Sunset Beach, but a stronger than expected finale month in March 1997, coupled with a ratings slide for newcomer Sunset Beach, saved The City from last place in the ratings for both of its two seasons on the air. After The City aired its final episode, ABC temporarily aired classic 30-minute episodes of All My Children, One Life to Live, and General Hospital in its place. Port Charles, which would debut in The City's timeslot in June 1997, would post a 2.6 rating for 1996–97, and would not fall below The City's lowest yearly rating until 2000–2001.

== Awards ==
=== Daytime Emmy Award wins ===
- 1996 "Outstanding Art Direction/Set Direction/Scenic Design for a Drama Series"
- 1996 "Outstanding Multiple Camera Editing for a Drama Series"
