= Darnell Williams =

British-born actor (born 1955)

- Born: 3 March 1955 (age 71); London, England
- Occupation: Actor
- Years active: 1974–present

Darnell Williams (born 3 March 1955) is a British television actor. He is best known for his portrayal of Jesse Hubbard on the ABC soap opera All My Children from 1981 to 1988, and from 2008 to 2011, a role that has earned him two Daytime Emmy Awards.

== Career ==
Williams began portraying Jesse Hubbard on All My Children in 1981. His character became involved in a love affair with upper middle class Angie Baxter (Debbi Morgan). The characters eventually married and thus Darnell Williams was one half of the first African American supercouple on an American soap opera. Williams won two Daytime Emmy Awards for his work on All My Children in the 1980s. During the mid-1980s, both he and Morgan co-hosted a dance show titled "New York Hot Tracks," that also featured music videos.

In 1988, Williams left All My Children. However, he returned to soap operas in 1994 as Jack Durban on As the World Turns; the role lasted until early 1995. Williams then appeared as Jesse Hubbard's look-alike Jacob Foster on Loving and The City. He later briefly reprised his role of Jesse on All My Children, albeit in angel form, when he welcomed Gillian Andrassy (Esta TerBlanche) into Heaven in 2001.

Williams had a recurring role as the counsellor on the primetime drama Felicity, and worked as a director and acting coach for All My Children.

In May 2007, Williams joined the cast of Guiding Light in the recurring role of the villainous Griggs, a man who A.C. Mallet was once employed by as a hit-man. He appeared in the play Spalding Gray: Stories Left to Tell in New York City through June 2007. In 2008, Williams, along with Gregori J. Martin, co-directed the independent film Manhattanites, starring Ilene Kristen, Forbes March, and Aiden Turner, Williams's co-star.

Williams returned to All My Children in January 2008 as a very much alive Jesse Hubbard, along with Debbi Morgan, who played Angie Hubbard. He appeared on "Oprah- the Last Season" with cast mates Debbi Morgan and Michael E. Knight in 2011.

In September 2011, Darnell Williams concluded his run on All My Children along with the rest of the cast, due to the cancellation of the serial. At the time All My Children ended, Williams was the oldest contracted male actor cast member with the show and the second oldest contracted actor after Susan Lucci.

In January 2012, it was confirmed that Williams would be joining the cast of the CBS daytime drama The Young and the Restless, where he would reunite with All My Children co-star Debbi Morgan.

Williams returned in the new internet version of All My Children, reprising his role of Jesse Hubbard. The show premiered on iTunes, Hulu and Hulu Plus on 29 April 2013.

Williams's film appearances include Sidewalk Stories, Short Cuts, and Simone.

Williams did not participate in the All My Children reunion that was featured on the 2 February 2017 edition of the Hallmark Channel's Home & Family show. However, Home & Family did utilize footage of Williams as his Jesse Hubbard character from the wedding of Greg Nelson and Jenny Gardner (played by Laurence Lau and Kim Delaney, respectively) on All My Children.

== Awards and nominations ==
Daytime Emmy Awards

Year	Award	Work	Result
1982	Outstanding Supporting Actor in a Drama Series	All My Children	Nominated
1983	Outstanding Supporting Actor in a Drama Series	All My Children	Won
1985	Outstanding Lead Actor in a Drama Series	All My Children	Won
2012	Outstanding Lead Actor in a Drama Series	All My Children	Nominated

Venice Film Festival

Year	Award	Work	Result
1994	Venice Film Festival for Best Ensemble Cast	Short Cuts	Nominated

Golden Globe Awards

Year	Award	Work	Result
1994	Golden Globe Award for Best Ensemble Cast	Short Cuts	Won

Soap Opera Digest Awards

Year	Award	Work	Result
1996	Soap Opera Digest Award for Outstanding Supporting Actor	Loving	Won

NAACP Image Awards

Year	Award	Work	Result
1996	NAACP Image Award for Outstanding Actor in a Daytime Drama Series	The City	Nominated
2003	NAACP Image Award for Outstanding Actor in a Daytime Drama Series	All My Children	Nominated
2011	NAACP Image Award for Outstanding Actor in a Daytime Drama Series	All My Children	Won

== See also ==
- Jesse Hubbard and Angie Baxter
- Supercouple
