= Esta TerBlanche =

South African actress (1973–2024)

- Born: 7 January 1973; Rustenburg, Transvaal, South Africa
- Died: 19 July 2024 (aged 51); Los Angeles, California, U.S.
- Occupation: Actress
- Years active: 1992–2013
- Spouse(s): André Kock (1997–2008; divorced)

Esta TerBlanche (7 January 1973 – 19 July 2024) was a South African actress, best known for her roles on television soap operas in both South Africa and the United States.

== Early life ==
TerBlanche was born in Rustenburg, Transvaal (now North West Province). She was of Huguenot descent. She grew up on a game farm, replete with monkeys, cows, horses, sheep, warthogs, and elands.

== Television ==
TerBlanche was crowned Miss Teen South Africa in 1991, and subsequently played Bienkie Naudé Hartman on the South African drama Egoli: Place of Gold from 1992 to 1995. In 1995, TerBlanche decided not to renew her contract with Egoli and, instead, opted to further her acting career in the U.S. Within three weeks of arriving in Los Angeles, she found her first job, acting in a hair products commercial. In 1997, TerBlanche was cast in the role of Gillian Andrassy on the American daytime drama All My Children. Gillian, a troublemaking princess, was killed off in 2001 as TerBlanche asked to be written out of the show to move back to South Africa.

TerBlanche made a guest appearance on Egoli: Place of Gold in 2004. She also made additional appearances on South African TV and in movies, but later returned to the United States. In 2010, she was interviewed by the American magazine Soap Opera Digest. She reported then that she had divorced and taken a break from acting. She stated that she had opened a spa, exploring her interest in the medical field and in healing.

In the interview, TerBlanche also noted that she had begun acting again and had recently filmed a pilot in South Africa. She expressed interest in returning to All My Children or acting in another soap, citing her time on All My Children as the best of her life. In 2011, she was briefly profiled in the People magazine tribute to All My Children. In August 2011, it was announced that TerBlanche would reprise the role of Gillian during the final weeks of All My Children's broadcast on American network television. TerBlanche made a guest appearance on the show on 24 August 2011.

Plays she appeared in include: The Glass Menagerie, Pygmalion, Hear Ye, and Ten Times Worse on Friday. She also starred in the film, Three Thieves and a Wedding. TerBlanche also worked as a TV presenter in South Africa for the environmental program 50/50 and the children's show, K-T.V. TerBlanche was well known in South Africa and appeared on the covers of many magazines.

== Death ==
TerBlanche died in Los Angeles on 19 July 2024, at the age of 51. In January 2025, it was announced her cause of death was the result of an intracranial hemorrhage stemming from blunt force trauma, with the belief being this was sustained from a "ground level fall".
