= Loving (TV series) =

American soap opera

- Genre: Soap opera
- Created by: Agnes Nixon; Douglas Marland
- Starring: Series cast
- Opening theme: "Theme from Loving" by Michael Karp (1983–1989); "The Loving Theme (#1)", sung by Johnny Mathis (1989–1991); "The Loving Theme (#2)", by David Randall Lowe and David M. Shapiro (1991–1992); "The Loving Theme (#3)" a.k.a. "L-O-V-I-N-G", by Jeffrey Osborne (1992–1995)
- Composers: Michael Karp (multiple episodes); Mike Renzi (multiple episodes and series finale); Score Productions (multiple episodes)
- Country of origin: United States
- Original language: English
- No. of seasons: 12
- No. of episodes: 3,169

Production
- Executive producer: See Crew
- Running time: 30 minutes
- Production company: Dramatic Creations

Original release
- Network: ABC
- Release: June 26, 1983 – November 10, 1995

Related
- The City; All My Children; One Life to Live; General Hospital

Loving is an American television soap opera that ran on ABC from June 26, 1983, to November 10, 1995, for a total of 3,169 episodes. The serial, set in the fictional town of Corinth, Pennsylvania, was co-created by Agnes Nixon and soap opera writer Douglas Marland.

Loving premiered on June 26, 1983, with a two-hour primetime movie and, on the next day, debuted as a half-hour weekday soap opera.

On July 4, 1995, ABC officially canceled Loving due to low ratings, and its final episode aired on November 10, 1995. On November 13, 1995, the following Monday, ABC replaced Loving with its spin-off The City, which ran until March 28, 1997.

== History ==
With the established and successful ABC daytime soap operas veering into a new trend of youth orientation and storylines with more action and adventure, soap creator Agnes Nixon and actor/writer Douglas Marland sought to create a new serial that would be introduced as a traditional, classic soap opera for the 1980s. Romance would be the show's key centerpiece; its original working title was Love Without End. By early 1983, the new creation was fully developed as Loving, with a cast set for both a primetime premiere and a weekday run.

Loving premiered on June 26, 1983, as a two-hour primetime movie. It starred much of the original cast and featured film actors Lloyd Bridges and Geraldine Page. Set in the fictional town of Corinth, Pennsylvania, the early years of the show revolved around the blue-collar Donovans and the blue-blood Aldens. Major social issues such as incest, alcoholism, and post-traumatic stress syndrome of Vietnam veterans were covered. Marland and Nixon left the series after a few years and in spite of ABC's bumping down Ryan's Hope to give Loving a choice timeslot, and cast additions of such popular All My Children stars as Debbi Morgan and Jean LeClerc, the ratings remained low throughout the show's run. Loving suffered from a constant revolving door of writers and producers, leading to questionable story moments such as a heroine's addiction to cough syrup and one character's selling his soul to the Devil. Circumstances became so desperate in the early 1990s that, in order to keep the show afloat, ABC assigned its own programming executives, network executive Haidee Granger and later, Vice President of Daytime Programming JoAnn Emmerich, to serve as executive producers. Despite its frequent subpar ratings, on June 26, 1993, Loving celebrated its 10th anniversary on ABC.

Long-running characters included Ava Rescott (played by Patty Lotz, 1983–1984; Roya Megnot, 1984–1988; Lisa Peluso, 1988–1995), a schemer whose adventures ranged from stuffing a pillow in her dress to simulate pregnancy to being kidnapped at Universal Studios to being menaced by her lover's identical twin. Other longtime favorites included Stacey Donovan Forbes (portrayed by Lauren-Marie Taylor, the only continuously running original cast member), who was killed off via a poisoned powder puff in summer 1995; boarding house owner Kate Rescott (Nada Rowand), whose tenants often included teen and young adult characters in trouble, or in numerous romantic entanglements; and Gwyneth Alden (played for the majority of the run by Christine Tudor), the long-suffering matriarch who never stopped loving her roguish ex, Clay, or her mentally disturbed children, Trisha and Curtis.

In early 1995, ABC Daytime planned to cancel the show and asked new head writers James Harmon Brown and Barbara Esensten to find a way to salvage a few components of the series. The writers embarked upon the show's last big storyline, which would be referred to as The Loving Murders, which lasted from July to October 1995. In the storyline, a mysterious serial killer stalked Corinth. During their rampage, they killed Stacey (poisoned powder puff), Clay (poisoned wine, passed on following sexual intercourse), Curtis (gassed), Cabot and Isabella (poisoned candles) and Jeremy (covered in quick-drying plaster) while Gwyneth and Ally avoided death by carbon monoxide. During their attempt to kill Tess, the killer was exposed to be Gwyneth, having seemingly snapped after Trisha had lost her memory and ran off with Trucker; she had believed that those she killed were suffering and she was ending their pain, only to be confronted with the realization that she killed Jeremy because he had discovered her actions. Distraught and horrified by her actions but unable to act on it due to Tess smashing her hands with a stapler, Gwyneth forces Steffi to take her life before the police arrive.

Loving characters Ally, Alex, Angie, Buck, Frankie, Jacob, Steffi, Jocelyn, Richard, Tony, Danny and Tess moved to New York City's SoHo District and began a new series, The City, which would run until the series finale on March 28, 1997.

In August 2013, the serial killer storyline was revisited on General Hospital as Luke Spencer and Holly Sutton found their way into the abandoned Alden mansion, in pursuit of an adversary who was hiding out in Corinth. Framed photographs of Gwyneth, Trisha and Cabot Alden could be seen, as Luke and Holly recounted the story of "The Loving Murders". Holly ruminated upon Gwyn's rationale for being the killer as being her need to "spare the people she loved from their pain." Following this, Luke found his ex-wife Laura tied up in the Alden family basement.

== Ratings history ==
Although Loving had low ratings throughout its history, its first few years were relatively encouraging. In its debut year (1983), it finished in 11th place and 3.9, above the then ailing soaps The Edge of Night and Search for Tomorrow. 1984 saw the show's ratings climb to a fairly comfortable 10th place and 4.1, holding that position for the 1985-1986 television season with 4.2. A change in timeslot, with Loving occupying the slot previously held by Ryan's Hope, was a major factor in ratings improvement (albeit having the opposite effect on Ryan's Hope).

The slow but steady ratings growth was not sustained in the long run. Loving fell back to 11th place, hitting last place for the first time, in early 1989 (between the January series finale of Ryan's Hope and the March premiere of NBC's Generations). In 1990, the show ranked 11th place as well. After Santa Barbara went off the air on January 15, 1993, Loving, according to television historian Alex McNeil, "was consistently the lowest rated of the ten network daytime soaps."

When it originally premiered, the show aired at 11:30 AM ET/10:30 AM CT/MT/PT. On October 8, 1984, the show was moved to the later 12:30 PM/11:30 AM timeslot, bumping Ryan's Hope up to Noon/11:00. This caused Ryan's Hope's ratings to plummet because many East Coast ABC stations pre-empted network programming at Noon for local news. Some affiliates, such as WSB-TV in Atlanta, chose to keep Ryan's Hope at 12:30, not airing Loving until after Ryan's Hope's cancellation in 1989. Despite airing in the 12:30 timeslot, Loving never achieved the ratings Ryan's Hope had during its glory years. In the Central, Mountain and Pacific time zones, Loving was often pre-empted at 11:30 for local newscasts, airing on a one-day delay earlier in the morning or not at all.

On August 17, 1992, ABC officially stopped programming the Noon/11:00am CT timeslot. Loving was then made available to affiliates at Noon/11 or 12:30/11:30. Some affiliates in the Central and Pacific Time Zones moved Loving to 11:00 AM to air local newscasts at 11:30. Despite the time slot changes on some affiliates, the national ratings for the show never improved. In fact, the show's national ratings were never strong enough to climb above tenth place. However, Loving did beat the genre's top-rated program, CBS' The Young and the Restless, in markets such as New York City, Los Angeles, Chicago, and Philadelphia, which were home to four of ABC's owned-and-operated stations, despite only competing with the first half hour of The Young and the Restless.

The show had a short two-year run in the early years of UK satellite and cable channel Sky One, starting in February 1989. Loving aired in an afternoon slot, Monday to Friday at 14:45, later moved to 14:30, before being cancelled and replaced by Santa Barbara in February 1991.

== Cast and crew ==
=== Executive producers ===
Duration	Name
June 27, 1983 to June 17, 1988	Joseph Stuart
June 20, 1988 to December 1, 1989	Joseph Hardy
December 4, 1989 to April 13, 1990	Mary-Ellis Bunim
April 16, 1990 to July 12, 1991	Jacqueline Babbin
July 15, 1991 to May 25, 1992	Fran Sears
May 26, 1992 to October 29, 1993	Haidee Granger
November 1, 1993 to January 6, 1995	JoAnn Emmerich
January 9, 1995 to November 10, 1995	Jean Dadario Burke

=== Producers ===
Duration	Name
May 21, 1990 to August 28, 1992	Barbara Duggan
August 31, 1992 to January 6, 1995	Jean Dadario Burke
January 9, 1995 to November 10, 1995	Jane Elliot & Laura Rakowitz

=== Associate producers ===
Duration	Name
June 27, 1983 to June 17, 1988	Barbara Duggan
June 20, 1988 to January 5, 1990	Achille Raspantini
January 8, 1990 to August 28, 1992	Richard R. Schilling
August 31, 1992 to May 31, 1994	Heidi Adam
June 1, 1994 to January 6, 1995	Heidi Adam & Dana Walker Keane
January 9, 1995 to May 26, 1995	Heidi Adam
May 29, 1995 to November 10, 1995	None

=== Coordinating producers ===
Duration	Name
June 20, 1988 to May 18, 1990	Barbara Duggan
May 21, 1990 to May 26, 1995	None
May 29, 1995 to November 10, 1995	Heidi Adam

=== Head writers ===
Years	Names
June 26, 1983 – June 14, 1985	Douglas Marland
June 17, 1985 – October 16, 1987	Agnes Nixon (uncredited); Ralph Ellis (credited)
October 19, 1987 – April 15, 1988	Ralph Ellis
September 1, 1988 – April 19, 1991	Millee Taggart; Tom King
April 22 – August 2, 1991	Millee Taggart
August 5, 1991 – January 9, 1992	Mary Ryan Munisteri
January 10, 1992 – January 15, 1993	Addie Walsh
January 18 – September 22, 1993	Millee Taggart; Robert Guza, Jr.
September 23, 1993 – August 26, 1994	Agnes Nixon
August 29, 1994 – February 17, 1995	Addie Walsh; Laurie McCarthy
February 20, 1995 – November 10, 1995	Barbara Esensten; James Harmon Brown

== Awards and nominations ==
=== Daytime Emmy Award wins ===
==== Drama performer categories ====
Category	Recipient	Role	Year
Supporting Actor	Bernard Barrow	Louie Slavinsky	1991

==== Other categories ====
- 1988 "Outstanding Achievement in Lighting Direction for a Drama Series"

=== Other awards ===
- Writers Guild of America Award (1994)

== International broadcasts ==
The show was broadcast in France under the title Amoureusement vôtre (Lovingly Yours), in Croatia as Ljubav, in Germany as Loving - Wege der Liebe, in Greece as "Έρωτες έρωτες έρωτες" ("Love, Love, Love") and in Italy as Quando si ama (When you're in love). In South Africa as "Loving", broadcast on M-Net was on the Open Time block, weekdays. In Turkey as Sevgi Bağları broadcast on Turkish Radio Television channel. In 2003, it was broadcast in most of Sub-Saharan Africa on the TVAfrica network, not long before its dissolution.
