= Jason Olive =

American actor (born 1972)

- Born: February 10, 1972 (age 54); Los Angeles, California
- Occupation: Actor
- Years active: 1997–present

Jason Lawrence Olive (born February 10, 1972) is an American actor. He is best known for his role as Joseph in the sitcom Tyler Perry's For Better or Worse.

== Early years ==
He attended the University of Hawaii on full athletic and academic scholarship. At the age of 17, he played his first professional volleyball tournament.

== Career ==
He had previously roles in many television series and movies including All My Children, BET's The Game, romantic comedy film Raising Helen, and others. In a dispute over the use of his photo in advertising for longer than allowed by his contract, Olive obtained a $1,133,000 judgment against General Nutrition Corporation, Inc. The judgement was affirmed on appeal in December 2018.

== Filmography ==
Film
Year	Title	Role	Notes
1999	Spenser: Small Vices (TV Movie)	Clint Stapleton	
1999	Love Goggles	Model	
2000	Punks	Lucas	
2001	The Feast of All Saints (TV Movie)	Richard Lermontant	
2004	Raising Helen	Chip	
2005	Bam Bam and Celeste	Graham	
2010	Reversion	Marcus	
2010	Kaboom	Hunter	
2011	Bad Actress	Detective Ray Stoker	
2015	Progress	Victor Jefferson	

Television
Year	Title	Role	Notes
1997	7th Heaven	Rick	Episode: "Happy's Valentine"
1997	Smart Guy	Xavier	Episode: "Big Picture"
1999	Passions	Frank Lomax	3 episodes
1999	Malcolm & Eddie	Rick	Episode: "Sneaky, Thieving, Double-Crossing Dates from Hell"
2002	All My Children	Frankie Hubbard	Unknown Episodes
2003	Half & Half	Jamal	Episode: "The Big Sexy Shame Episode"
2003	Hope & Faith	Security Guard	Episode: "Remembrance of Rings Past"
2005	Living with Fran	James	Episode: "The Reunion"
2005	The Comeback	Jesse Wood	13 episodes
2005	CSI: Miami	Brad Walker	Episode: "Prey"
2006	Criminal Minds	Parker Dunley	Episode: "Somebody's Watching"
2007	CSI: Crime Scene Investigation	Head Host	Episode: "Meet Market"
2007	CSI: NY	Russell Ballard	Episode: "Heart of Glass"
2008	Tyler Perry's House of Payne	Chad Randolph	Episode: "And... Cut!"
2008	The Game	McHottie	3 episodes
2009	Melrose Place	Detective Drake	4 episodes
2011	Traffic Light	Sam	Episode: "Credit Balance"
2011–2017	Tyler Perry's For Better or Worse	Joseph	162 episodes
2012	Don't Trust the B— in Apartment 23	Hot Trey	Episode: "Whatever It Takes..."
