= Debbi Morgan =

American actress

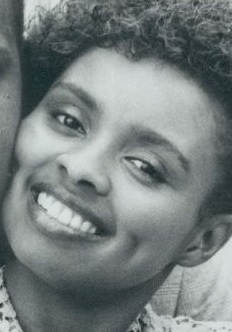
- Morgan in The Jesse Owens Story (1984)
- Born: Deborah Ann Morgan; September 20; Dunn, North Carolina, U.S.
- Occupation: Actress
- Years active: 1971–present
- Spouses: Charles Weldon (m. 1980; div. 1984); Charles S. Dutton (m. 1989; div. 1994); Donn Thompson (m. 1997; div. 2000); Jeffrey Winston (m. 2009)

Deborah Ann "Debbi" Morgan (born September 20, 1951 or 1956) (Note: Morgan's year of birth is disputed. Many sources claim her full birth date as September 20, 1956. However, the Associated Press says she turned 74 in September of 2025. And an article from People which was published in November 1997, stated that Morgan was 46 years old at the time. Both indicate a 1951 birth year.) is an American film and television actress. She is best known for her portrayal of Angie Baxter-Hubbard on the ABC soap opera All My Children, for which she became the first African American to win the Daytime Emmy Award for Outstanding Supporting Actress in a Drama Series in 1989.

She also appeared as the Seer in the fourth and fifth seasons of Charmed. In film, her performance as Mozelle Batiste-Delacroix in Eve's Bayou (1997) earned critical acclaim and the Independent Spirit Award for Best Supporting Female. More recently she played a recurring role as Estelle Green in the starz crime drama series Power and its spinoff Power Book II: Ghost from 2014 to 2021, and also co-starred in the Fox drama series Our Kind of People.

== Early life ==
Morgan was born in Dunn, North Carolina, the daughter of Lora, a teacher, and George Morgan Jr., a butcher. She has a younger sister, Terry. The family relocated to the Bronx when Morgan was still a child.

In a 1997 interview with People, Morgan revealed that her father was an abusive alcoholic. While he never physically harmed his daughters, Morgan recalled her mother often running from him. Her father died of leukemia in 1975. Morgan graduated from Aquinas High School.

== Career ==
Morgan's earliest film role was in the movie Cry Uncle! in 1971. She played the role of Vi. Morgan's earliest recurring role was on What's Happening!! from 1976 to 1977 as Diane Harris, and also appeared on Good Times. In 1979, she received critical acclaim for her portrayal of Alex Haley's great-aunt Elizabeth Harvey on the 1979 miniseries Roots: The Next Generations, and her guest-starring role as Curtis Jackson's ex-girlfriend turned prostitute on The White Shadow. Her most notable role was Angie Baxter Hubbard on the soap opera All My Children, a role she originally played from January 1982 to July 1990. Her portrayal of Angie struck a chord with many Black viewers across America. Angie and her love interest, Jesse Hubbard (Darnell Williams), became the first African-American "supercouple" on daytime soap operas. In 1989, Morgan won the Daytime Emmy Award for Outstanding Supporting Actress in a Drama Series (which she shares with Santa Barbara actress Nancy Lee Grahn). She and Williams also co-hosted a music video show titled New York Hot Tracks in the mid-1980s.

After leaving All My Children, Morgan played the role of Chantal Marshall on the NBC soap opera, Generations (replacing actress Sharon Brown) and remained with the show until it ended. She then reprised her role as Angie Hubbard on ABC's Loving in 1993. In 1995, she brought the same character to The City (a retooled version of Loving), making Morgan one of the few performers to portray the same character on three different soap operas. From 1997 to 1998, she also played Dr. Ellen Burgess on Port Charles. In the 1980s and 1990s, Morgan became a de facto symbol for the possibilities for black women as all of her soap opera roles involved her playing a successful doctor.

Morgan earned acclaim from movie critics for her portrayal of clairvoyant Mozelle Batiste Delacroix in director Kasi Lemmons' drama film Eve's Bayou (1997). For her portrayal, she won a Chicago Film Critics Association Award and an Independent Spirit Award and was nominated for an Image Award. She later left soap operas and began her film career with roles in She's All That (1999), The Hurricane (1999), Love & Basketball (2000), Woman Thou Art Loosed (2004), Coach Carter (2005), Relative Strangers (2006), and Color of the Cross (2006). On television, she had roles in The Practice, Strong Medicine, Boston Public, Providence, and Soul Food.

From 2002 to 2003, Morgan played lead character Lora Gibson, opposite Lea Thompson, on the Lifetime drama series For the People. She also played the role of the Seer in the fourth and fifth seasons of Charmed. Morgan, along with costar Darnell Williams, returned to All My Children in January 2008, 10 years after leaving daytime television. In May 2009 and 2011, she was nominated for the Daytime Emmy Award for Outstanding Lead Actress in a Drama Series. In 2011, ABC cancelled All My Children, and Morgan joined the cast of The Young and the Restless as Yolanda "Harmony" Hamilton on October 7, 2011, exactly two weeks after All My Children aired its final television episode on September 23, 2011. In 2013, Morgan appeared in the Web-based reboot of All My Children, reprising her role of Angie Hubbard. The series premiered on April 29, 2013, and was cancelled after a single season. In November 2013, after All My Children was cancelled, Morgan was cast in Starz drama series, Power, opposite Omari Hardwick and Naturi Naughton. In 2015, she co-starred alongside Richard Lawson and Vivica A. Fox in two TV One holiday movies: Royal Family Thanksgiving and Royal Family Christmas. Morgan later played Toni Braxton's mother in the Lifetime biopic Toni Braxton: Unbreak My Heart.

In 2017, Morgan appeared in the Marvel miniseries The Defenders playing Delores. The following year, she had a recurring role in the BET drama series The Quad. In 2019, she appeared in the Netflix film Sextuplets starring Marlon Wayans. She starred with Kelly Rowland in the Lifetime movie Merry Liddle Christmas and its sequels. In 2021, she was cast in the Lee Daniels prime time soap opera, Our Kind of People opposite Yaya DaCosta. In 2023 she portrayed Keyshia Cole's mother in the Lifetime biopic Keyshia Cole: This is My Story. Jasmine Blu from TVfanatic wrote in her review: "Debbi Morgan, though, has always been a force, a legend who deserves every last bit of her flowers right here and now. To say she stole this film would be the understatement of the century. She was magnificent. She did such a remarkable job playing Frankie; there were moments it literally gave me chills. It's almost eerie how well Morgan embodied the late mother and grandmother." Morgan later was cast in the drama film Divorce in the Black written and directed by Tyler Perry.

== Personal life ==
Morgan has been married four times and has no children. Her first marriage was to Charles Weldon from 1980 until 1984. In 1989, Morgan married actor Charles S. Dutton, divorcing in 1994. From 1997 until 2000, Morgan was married to photographer Donn Thompson. Morgan has been married to Jeffrey Winston since June 2009.

== Filmography ==
=== Film ===
Year	Title	Role	Notes
1971	Cry Uncle!	Olga Winter	
1974	Amazing Grace	Morgan State Student	
1975	Mandingo	Dite	
1976	Taxi Driver	Girl At Columbus Circle	Uncredited
1976	The Monkey Hu$tle	Vi	
1979	Love's Savage Fury	Opal	Television film
1981	Thornwell	Katherine	Television film
1984	The Jesse Owens Story	Ruth Solomon Owens	Television film
1987	Guilty of Innocence: The Lenell Geter Story	Marcia Hickson	Television film
1988	Odliver and Company	Riltha (voice)	
1992	Perry Mason: The Case of the Fatal Framing	Maureen Gilman	Television film
1997	Eve's Bayou	Mozelle Batiste Delacroix	Independent Spirit Award for Best Supporting Female; Chicago Film Critics Association Award for Best Supporting Actress; Nominated — Satellite Award for Best Supporting Actress – Motion Picture; Nominated — NAACP Image Award for Outstanding Supporting Actress in a Motion Picture
1999	She's All That	Ms. Wilma Rousseau	
1999	Spawn 3: Ultimate Battle	Granny Blake	
1999	The Hurricane	Mae Thelma Carter	Nominated — NAACP Image Award for Outstanding Actress in a Motion Picture
1999	Asunder	Lauren Hubbs	
2000	Love & Basketball	Nona McCall	
2000	The Runaway	Reba Monroe	Television film
2004	Woman Thou Art Loosed	Twana	
2005	Coach Carter	Tonya	
2005	Back in the Day	Mrs. Norah Packer	
2006	Relative Strangers	Mrs. Janette Manoire	
2006	Color of the Cross	Mary	
2015	Royal Family Thanksgiving	Alfreda Royal	Television film
2015	Royal Family Christmas	Alfreda Royal	Television film
2016	Toni Braxton: Unbreak My Heart	Evelyn Jackson Braxton	Television film
2018	Rent-an-Elf	Catherine	
2019	Sextuplets	Janet	
2019	Merry Liddle Christmas	Marchelle	Television film
2020	Merry Liddle Christmas Wedding	Marchelle	Television film
2021	Big Fifty: The DelRhonda Hood Story	Tina	
2021	Merry Liddle Christmas Baby	Marchelle	Television film
2021	American Gangster Presents: Big 50 - The Delrhonda Hood Story	Tina	
2023	Keyshia Cole: This Is My Story	Franky	Television film
2024	Divorce in the Black	Gene	

=== Television ===
Year	Title	Role	Notes
1976–1977	Good Times	Ellen / Samantha	Episodes: "The Break Up" and "A Friend in Need"
1976–1977	What's Happening!!	Diane Harris	Recurring role, 6 episodes
1979	The Love Boat	Stephanie Jackson	Episode: "Second Chance/Don't Push Me/Like Father, Like Son" S2 E16
1979	Roots: The Next Generations	Elizabeth Harvey	TV Mini-Series
1979	The White Shadow	Delores Raye	Episode: "Delores, of Course"
1980	The Incredible Hulk	Jody	Episode: "Falling Angels"
1981	Sanford	Charlene	Episode: "Love Is Blind"
1981–1982	Behind the Screen	Lynette Porter	Series regular, 13 episodes
1980-1982	Trapper John, M.D.	Linda / Denise	Episodes: "Hot Line" and "Ladies in Waiting"
1982–2013	All My Children	Dr. Angela Baxter Hubbard	Series regular Daytime Emmy Award for Outstanding Supporting Actress in a Drama Series (1989); Gracie Award for Outstanding Female Lead – Daytime Drama (2009); NAACP Image Award for Outstanding Actress in a Daytime Drama Series (2009, 2010); Nominated — Daytime Emmy Award for Outstanding Lead Actress in a Drama Series (2009, 2011–12); Nominated — Daytime Emmy Award for Outstanding Younger Actress in a Drama Series (1986); Nominated — NAACP Image Award for Outstanding Actress in a Daytime Drama Series (2011); Nominated — Soap Opera Digest Award for Outstanding Lead Actress in a Daytime Drama (1990); Nominated — Soap Opera Digest Awards for Outstanding Younger Lead Actress (1986)
1990–1991	Generations	Chantal Marshall	Series regular
1991	A Different World	Lisa Westin	Episode: "To Tell the Truth"
1992	The Cosby Show	Tracy	Episode: "Eat, Drink and Be Wary"
1992	Herman's Head	Melodie	Episode: "Brackenhooker"
1992–1993	Roc	Linda	Episodes: "The Hand That Rocs the Cradle" and "The Love Bug Bites Back"
1993–1995	Loving	Dr. Angela 'Angie' Hubbard	Series regular: August 2, 1993 – November 10, 1995
1995–1997	The City	Dr. Angela 'Angie' Hubbard	Series regular Nominated — NAACP Image Award for Outstanding Actress in a Daytime Drama Series (1996)
1997–1998	Port Charles	Dr. Mary Eleanor 'Ellen' Burgess	Series regular
1997-1998	General Hospital	Dr. Mary Eleanor 'Ellen' Burgess	Special guest star
1999	Spawn	Granny Blake	3 episodes, voice role
1999–2000	Any Day Now	Unknown	Episodes: "Elephants in the Room" and "You Think I Am Lying to You?"
2000	City of Angels	Unknown	Episode: "Smoochas Gracias"
2001	The Practice	Marsha Shinn	Episode: "The Day After"
2000-2001	Strong Medicine	Chloe Simons	Episodes: "Pilot" and "Mortality"
2000–2001	Boston Public	Superintendent Marsha Shinn	Recurring role, 4 episodes
2001	Providence	Marilyn Chase	Episode: "Home Sweet Home"
2001–2002	Soul Food	Lynette Van Adams	Recurring role, 3 episodes NAACP Image Award for Outstanding Supporting Actress in a Drama Series (2002)
2002–2003	Charmed	The Seer	Recurring role, 8 episodes
2002–2003	For the People	District Attorney Lora Gibson	Series regular, 18 episodes
2004	Touching Evil	Aileen Mooney	Episode: "Pilot"
2006	Ghost Whisperer	Mrs. Belle Riley	Episode: "Melinda's First Ghost"
2006	Close to Home	Lizette Carter	Episode: "Prodigal Son"
2006–2007	The Bold and the Beautiful	District Attorney Jennifer Tartaro	Recurring role, 14 episodes
2011–2012	The Young and the Restless	Harmony Hamilton	Series regular, 43 episodes
2014–2020	Power	Estelle	Recurring role, 11 episodes
2017	The Defenders	Delores	Episodes: "The H Word" and "Worst Behavior"
2018	The Quad	Dr. Helen Chambers	Recurring role, 3 episodes
2019	Tales	Clarice	Episode: "My Life"
2019–2021	Bigger	Debbi Roberts	Recurring role, 3 episodes Nominated — Black Reel Awards for Television for Outstanding Guest Actress, Comedy Series (2021)
2020–2023	Power Book II: Ghost	Estelle Green	Recurring role, 10 episodes
2021	Fantasy Island	Eileen	Episode: "Quantum Entanglement"
2021–2022	Our Kind of People	Patricia Williams	Recurring role, 11 episodes
2024–present	Beauty in Black	Olivia Bellarie	Series regular

=== Music video appearances ===
- Cameo – "Attack Me with Your Love" (1985), "Single Life" (1985)
