= Jean Dadario Burke =

American television director and producer

Jean Dadario Burke is an American television soap opera producer and director, most notably of the daytime television show All My Children. During her career in daytime television, Burke won many Daytime Emmy Awards, primarily as executive producer for that show. She is credited with saving many characters from the canceled soap opera Loving and transporting them to its sequel show, The City, by radically reworking the storyline, changing the setting to New York City, eliminating half of the cast, and bringing in the star Morgan Fairchild. She was part of a team that ultimately took the characters of Loving away from a "stilted upper-middle-class" orientation. She was instrumental in the careers of many daytime actors, including Josh Duhamel.

Burke was born in The Bronx, and started her career as a production secretary on the show Search for Tomorrow. She held numerous jobs in the soap opera industry, doing casting, directing, and writing, and sometimes working on several shows concurrently. She was a casting assistant at All My Children, was promoted to technical director, then later to director and senior producer, and finally to executive producer from 1998 to 2003. She was a director at Another World from 1988 to 1990. She was executive producer from 1995 to 1997 of the show The City. From 1994 to 1995, she was executive producer of the daytime show Loving. She was a director and associate producer of Ryan's Hope from 1988 to 1989.

== Awards and nominations ==
Year	Award	Role	Show	Result
2002	Daytime Emmy Award	Drama series	All My Children	Nominated
2000	Daytime Emmy Award	Drama Series	All My Children	Nominated
1999	Daytime Emmy Award	Drama series	All My Children	Nominated
1998	Daytime Emmy Award	Drama series	All My Children	Won
1987	Daytime Emmy Award	Drama series	All My Children	Nominated
1985	Daytime Emmy Award	Drama series	All My Children	Nominated
1984	Daytime Emmy Award	Technical direction	All My Children	Nominated
1983	Daytime Emmy Award	Technical direction	All My Children	Won
1982	Daytime Emmy Award	Technical direction	All My Children	Won
1981	Daytime Emmy Award	Technical direction	All My Children	Won

Sources for awards:

Preceded by JoAnn Emmerich	Executive Producer of Loving; January 9, 1995 – November 10, 1995	Succeeded by show canceled
Preceded by none	Executive Producer of The City; November 13, 1995 – March 28, 1997	Succeeded by show canceled
Preceded by Francesca James	Executive Producer of All My Children; April 20, 1998 – September 19, 2003	Succeeded by Julie Hanan Carruthers
