= Cornelius Smith Jr. =

American actor (born 1982)

- Born: March 18, 1982 (age 44); San Diego, California, U.S.
- Education: Southern Methodist University (BFA); New York University (MFA)
- Occupation: Actor
- Years active: 2007–present
- Spouse: Stephanie Lilly Smith (m. 2018)
- Website: http://corneliussmithjr.com/

Cornelius Smith Jr. (born March 18, 1982) is an American actor best known for his portrayal of Marcus Walker on the ABC drama series Scandal from 2015–18, and Frankie Hubbard on the ABC soap opera All My Children from December 2007–September 2011. He received a Daytime Emmy Award nomination for Outstanding Younger Actor in a Drama Series in 2009.

In 2018, Smith was cast in the upcoming film Against All Enemies.

== Early life ==
Although born in San Diego, Smith grew up in Detroit, Michigan. Smith graduated from the Class of 2000 from Cass Tech High School in Detroit. Then he went on to Southern Methodist University in Dallas. Cornelius is a member of Alpha Phi Alpha fraternity. After attending Southern Methodist University for his undergraduate education, he went to New York University and received his Master of Fine Arts in Acting.

== Personal life ==
In May 2018, Smith married Stephanie Lilly Smith in Mexico.

== Filmography ==
=== Film ===
Film
Year	Title	Role	Notes
2014	Anatomy of Deception	Steve	
2015	You Never Left	Lamar	Short film
2018	Jingle Belle	Michael Hill	TV movie
2019	Seberg	Ray Robertson	

=== Television ===
Television
Year	Title	Role	Notes
2007–2011	All My Children	Frankie Hubbard	
2013	Major Crimes	Rangemaster R. Morton	Episode: "There's No Place Like Home"
2014	Forever	Fabian North	Episode: "The Pugilist Break"
2015	Whitney	Michael Houston	Television film
2015–2018	Scandal	Marcus Walker	46 episodes
2015	Agents of S.H.I.E.L.D.	Case	Episode: "One Door Closes"
2018	How to Get Away with Murder	Marcus Walker	Episode: "Lahey v. Commonwealth of Pennsylvania"
2018	Hell's Kitchen	Himself	Episode: "Hot Potato"
2019	Love, Take Two	Scott Meyers	Television film
2020	Manhunt	Mayor Bill Campbell	2 episodes
2020	Self Made	W. E. B. Du Bois	2 episodes
2020	God Friended Me	Corey Smith	3 episodes
2022	Five Days at Memorial	Dr. Bryant King	

=== Stage credits ===
Year	Title	Role	Theatre
2007	Romeo and Juliet	Ensemble	Public Theatre; Shakespeare in the Park
2022	American Prophet	Frederick Douglass	Arena Stage

=== Video games ===
Video games
Year	Title	Role	Notes
2018	Detroit: Become Human	Deviant Android	

== Awards ==
Year	Association	Category	Work	Result	Ref.
2009	Daytime Emmy Awards	Outstanding Younger Actor in a Drama Series	All My Children	Nominated	
2009	NAACP Image Awards	Outstanding Actor in a Daytime Drama Series	All My Children	Nominated	
2010	NAACP Image Awards	Outstanding Actor in a Daytime Drama Series	All My Children	Won	
2011	NAACP Image Awards	Outstanding Actor in a Daytime Drama Series	All My Children	Nominated	
