= JR Chandler and Babe Carey =

JR and Babe
- Jacob Young and Alexa Havins as JR and Babe, 2003
- Duration: 2003–08
- Introduced by: Julie Hanan Carruthers
- Jacob Young and Amanda Baker as JR and Babe, 2008
In-universe information
- Other names: Jabe
- Family: Chandler, Cooney
- Spouse: 2003, 2004–05, 2006–07
- Children: AJ Chandler

JR Chandler and Babe Carey are fictional characters of the JR and Babe or Jabe couple from the American daytime drama All My Children. JR Chandler was portrayed by Jacob Young. Babe Carey was portrayed by actress Alexa Havins, and then by Amanda Baker. Written as volatile and yet loving, the up-and-down romance tells of a young star-crossed couple who met one captivating night at the end of a fog-covered dock and from there are faced with much interference, significantly but unintentionally caused by each other, in their struggle for true happiness.

The love story was originally scripted by former All My Children head writer Megan McTavish, and debuted on television in October 2003. The pairing's love-hate relationship soon gained a large and loyal following, despite the characters going through periods where they were not individually thought of fondly by viewers. The couple's popularity extended beyond the soap opera medium in early 2006, when the two were prominently featured in celebrity magazine Celebrity Living. In September 2011, People magazine named them one of the supercouples of the 2000s in their tribute to the series. The couple's reign came to an end on October 23, 2008, when the writers decided to have Babe struggle for and lose her life after a series of tornadoes hit Pine Valley.

== Writing ==
=== Background ===
In 1992, ABC executives decided that the show needed a fresh perspective and promoted Agnes Nixon's protégé, Megan McTavish, to the position of head writer. McTavish began adding new dimensions to the show. At the start of her third stint as All My Children head writer, she created character Babe Carey. Actress Alexa Havins was cast in the role, and Babe first appeared in the fictional town of Pine Valley on October 13, 2003. She was introduced as a vixen latched onto the arm of wealthy heir to the Chandler fortune JR Chandler, having had a one-night stand with JR's stepbrother, Jamie Martin, her first night there.

When McTavish and Brian Frons, president of ABC Daytime, collaborated on the storyline, their inspiration for the pairing was a story from two decades earlier — the Adam Chandler/Dixie Cooney/Tad Martin love triangle of the late 1980s — where Adam was set up as the roadblock against Tad and Dixie's union. McTavish and Frons originally saw Babe and Jamie as the true love couple with JR as the antagonist. Babe's true love was later revised. The character explains, "Jamie was around at one of the lowest points of my life, and I thought that he was the one. But I was wrong. As great as Jamie was, he could never take JR’s place in my heart, because JR never left."

In 2004, JR's portrayer, actor Jacob Young, wanted to focus more on widening his acting range. This was coincidental to the writers turning JR in a different direction. They deepened the story by having JR act increasingly more like his father, when he was originally characterized by having several aspects of his mother's personality.

The JR and Babe relationship was written as exemplifying the notion that love endures all, which became evident through their dysfunction. SOAPnet.com described their romance as the daytime version of Tommy Lee and Pamela Anderson, minus the sex tape and tattoos, but with the addition of felonies. The characters break nearly every vow, and commit multiple crimes during their "three" marriages, while their connection remains strong. SOAPnet referred to this as "very romantic, but also slightly insane". JR and Babe fight and divorce but always end back up together.

In late 2007, after four years on the series, Havins decided to leave the role of Babe to pursue other acting opportunities; the decision was confirmed on September 4, 2007, by magazine Soap Opera Digest. Actress Amanda Baker was selected to step into the role. With Baker as Babe, the writers decided to continue the JR and Babe love story but as more mature this time. In late 2008, after a year as Babe, Baker explained how Babe had grown since her portrayal of the character. "I think that she has become a lot more responsible," stated Baker. "She's definitely made some changes within herself, become more mature. At one point in time, especially with JR, a lot of her choices were careless and she thought too much with her heart."

Charles Pratt, Jr., new head writer of the series, ultimately decided to permanently kill Babe off. In an interview with Soap Opera Digest before her final episodes aired, Baker stated, "Going out with a bang is definitely better than going out with a whimper, and I'm going out with a bang!" Babe was killed off on October 23, 2008. Right before her death, the series showcased JR and Babe once again declaring each other as true loves.

=== Recurring themes ===
Several recurring themes were incorporated into the JR and Babe romance, such as the pairing's meeting on the pier in San Diego, being star-crossed, JR's inner turmoil, and Babe's cheating. The "pier in San Diego" theme became symbolic for JR and Babe's experience of love at first sight. In the December 23, 2003 episode, Babe refers to meeting JR on a foggy dock as the answer to their prayers and confesses that she loved him upon seeing him. In the February 16, 2006 episode, the two describe themselves as lost until they saw each other.

The couple was occasionally compared to Tad and Dixie. Before her "death" in 2002, Dixie is said to have given JR a necklace Tad gave her. Once committed to Babe, JR gives Babe the necklace, saying Dixie believed it was filled with more love than he could ever imagine and that this is what he wants for himself, Babe and their family. Several months later, when JR is recovering from his jump out of a window, enraged at Babe for her one-night stand with Josh Madden, Tad tells JR that JR loves Babe the same way that he himself loves Dixie.

JR's father usually served as an obstacle in separating the pairing, and happiness for the two was typically a sign that tragedy would soon follow. One example is their 2006 honeymoon, where JR sketches a picture of Babe. In reference to the 1997 James Cameron film Titanic, where the two star-crossed lovers in the film are separated by tragedy, Babe states, "This is so Leo DiCaprio, but you are way hotter." Tragedy is foreshadowed when JR's sketch of Babe blows over in the wind (slow motion), following a scene where JR has just reassured Babe that everything will be fine. Meanwhile, JR's family back home predicts that he will fall into a place "so deep and dark" after Dixie reveals herself to have purposely stayed "dead" that "even Babe won't be able to reach him".

Author Carol P. from Total TV Online, when describing JR as a tortured soul, commented, "In the annals of literary history, there are many examples of the tortured soul anti-hero; i.e. Prince Hamlet, Mr. Darcy from Pride and Prejudice, Mr. Rochester from Jane Eyre, etc." She said that people are drawn to these characters "specifically because they are not your run-of–the mill male protagonists who win the day" and that they are rather "flawed to such a degree that we, as the reader or the viewer are often afraid, that they may never find the peace and joy we desire for them". P. drew similarities between Dixie and Babe, reasoning that Babe possesses several of Dixie's worst qualities (lying, manipulation, unfaithfulness, etc.), and concluded that this was another reason JR married Babe:

How can a young man, who has been raised with mixed messages about love, truth, and self worth, find a suitable life mate? For JR it wasn’t as simple as it appeared to have happened. There is so very much about Arabella 'Babe' Carey that was reminiscent to JR of his 'lost' mother; her size, her build, her coloring, her accent, her love of life, people, and experiences. JR was a goner the moment he spent any amount of time with her. What JR neglected to realize was that one person cannot and should not replace anyone in our lives; and that no two people will ever be exactly alike.

In 2006, a few months after the couple's second wedding, the writers complicated JR and Babe's relationship by having JR try to kill Babe due to a mental breakdown and the belief that he would be saving their son. Not wanting Babe to unjustly die later in life and cause their son the same pain that he went through by losing mother Dixie, or the pain caused by lies, JR reasons that if their son were to lose Babe at an earlier age as opposed to later in life, it will hurt less due to significantly faded memories. In addition, JR was written to fear Babe targeting their son by running away with him and leaving JR without a wife and a child. JR's murder attempt on Babe was a controversial story arc by the writers (see below), further agitated by Babe's willingness to stand by JR even after the murder attempt, later welcome him into her bed, and stand up for him at his attempted murder trial. JR having accidentally harmed best friend Kendall Hart Slater, who subsequently became comatose as a result of the murder attempt, was also ill-received as viewers felt the character should receive jail time. The writers saw the story arc as an opportunity to further the theme of JR and Babe being true loves. To assist this, ABC ran promotional commercials to the original version of the song "Listen to Your Heart" of Babe voicing heartbreak at knowing JR tried to kill her interspersed with the couple enduring it all.

On two separate occasions, JR expresses to Babe that he felt he was insane when he tried to kill her. One daunting conversation he has with Babe about his mental turmoil suggests a deep-seated inner battle that he continually loses:

The pain. I can't feel the pain, Babe. If I do, it'll kill me. I don't know how to explain it. It's this feeling that I've had inside me ever since I can remember. In here. The only way that I can describe it to you is — it's as if something is living inside of me, waiting to choke me. Making me drown. Always there, ready to pull me under. And sometimes I'm able to get rid of it, numb it. Why do you think that I became an alcoholic? Why do you think I started using drugs, long before my voice ever changed? I would get high every minute of every day if I could, if I could stop from feeling it. And sometimes I feel like it's just going to take over. And a few times it has. When I feel it, I can't talk about it. I can't even acknowledge it. I'm afraid it's just too much. I'm — I'm afraid that it's going to destroy everyone and everything that I care about. How many times have I almost lost you? But I'm going to fight it.

Other significant problems given to the romance are the couple's trust issues. One issue revolves around JR not knowing if he can trust Babe to be faithful to him. After cheating on JR with his brother Jamie due to what Babe states was a result of being nervous about meeting JR's family for the first time, JR later develops the tendency to occasionally refer to Babe as "a slut" or issue one-liners about her inability to be faithful to a romantic partner. Months after JR's murder attempt on Babe, the writers sought to prominently resurrect the unfaithfulness theme. Babe voices that JR does not communicate with her as much as he used to. Consistently feeling this way, Babe is seen being drawn to relative new character and "white knight" Josh Madden, whom she eventually cheats on JR with, emotionally and later sexually. "JR doesn't let Babe in," relayed Havins of her character's emotional affair with Josh.

The series often used Josh versus JR promotional commercials to achieve further interest in the love triangle.

"He has that wall up, and it's not necessarily his fault; it's his past that has built the wall. I think maybe Babe had unrealistic expectations hoping, 'Oh, with time he'll let me in.' Well, it's their second marriage and they have a child together and it still has not changed. That wall is not budging." Havins continued, "Babe can only take so much. Plus, her husband tried to kill her. I honestly think, in a way, this is a hint of a delayed reaction, emotionally, to that." Havins felt that JR's murder attempt on Babe seemingly came out of nowhere:

It happened so fast, and the resolve was in the blink of an eye. I would walk away for a lot less! I think she was so wanting to get that family unit back on track that she didn't allow herself the proper time to heal. Then, on top of it, here's Josh. Everything she wants to feel with her husband she's feeling with Josh, and that's what's missing, because JR doesn't talk.

Josh was written as the complete opposite of JR, and therefore representing everything that JR is not. Havins clarified: "At first, it's a wake-up call for her current relationship. It's like, 'Wow, this is what I could have and I don't.' And then she genuinely cares for Josh." Babe and Josh's friendship and emotional connection grows each day. "...it was pretty much inevitable," said Havins of the new romance. "Yes, it's a lack of judgment, but passion heats up, and it is what it is."

The writers initiated a storyline twist when choosing to have JR open up to Babe about his feelings moments after Babe has engaged in sexual intercourse with Josh for the first and only time, with this being unknown to JR. Babe immediately feels guilty about the tryst. Havins felt that Babe would be "a cold, heartless bitch" if she did not. "When she comes home, JR finally opens up to her. If he was the same heartless guy, she would walk away and not look back, because she made the decision before she slept with [Josh] that it was over with JR," said Havins. "In her mind, it was, 'It's done. He's never going to give me what I want. That chapter has been closed and I'm moving on.' That's how I played it." In addressing the twist, Havins stated, "But the whole kink in the plan is, JR opens up to her out of nowhere... She's like, 'How can I walk away when he's doing what I've always wanted him to do?’"

JR is eventually informed of Babe's one-night stand with Josh by her father (David Hayward). Not believing it, even when Josh confirms the encounter, viewers saw JR try to move on with his life and be happy with Babe. Once his suspicion gets the better of him, however, he confronts Babe about the matter. Babe tells the truth, and, in a dramatic fashion, JR later throws himself out a two-story window while drunk. While recovering, he insists that he no longer loves Babe. To add further conflict, Babe is written as thoroughly determined to win JR back; she undermines his wishes not to live with her. "Babe is at the Chandler mansion. JR is home from the hospital and Babe isn't letting up," said Havins. "She's very dedicated to getting through to him. She's not saying, 'Let's get back together and forget anything ever happened.' It's more like, 'Let's try to move forward.' They aren't having an 'I love you' moment or anything like that, but she breaks the ice a little bit." In addition, Babe's refusal to let JR go is happening during a serial killer arc, where Babe's life is in danger and one of her good friends (Erin Lavery) has just been murdered by the killer. In a moment where Babe confides to JR about this, viewers again witnessed the couple's star-crossed theme. "He's sleeping and she is crying at his bedside and says, 'I need you so much.' Not only is she going through this, but she doesn't have her rock and best friend to lean on," stated Havins. "It's a lonely place to be. He opens his eyes and almost makes the move to connect — but then he doesn't."

In early 2007, viewers watched as JR's mother, who had recently been discovered alive, is murdered by the serial killer in pursuit of Babe. Though Babe is the serial killer's actual target, Dixie dies in her place. JR originally takes comfort in still having Babe at his side, and vows not to blame her for Dixie's death. This later changes when the series showcases JR witness a kiss between Babe and Josh. Babe explains the kiss as a goodbye gesture, but JR is adamant on making her suffer. When Babe is later attacked by the serial killer, however, she is presumed dead, except by those who made her body appear lifeless in order to keep the serial killer from attacking her again. The writers scripted JR as having a difficult time dealing with Babe's perceived death, but eventually reunited the two.

== Storyline ==
JR and Babe have been married for one year; their time together has been tempestuous, and is further exacerbated by an incident involving a baby switch. One of the babies involved is JR and Babe's son—Adam Chandler III. Adam, usually referred to as "Little Adam" or "Little A", is switched with Bianca Montgomery (Eden Riegel)'s child (Miranda Montgomery), but he is eventually returned to his parents. JR and Babe divorce as a result of Babe's affair with JR's brother, Jamie. In 2005, Babe then schemes to steal Little Adam away from JR, but she and JR grow close when she takes the blame for JR's drunken hit-and-run of Amanda Dillon.

Soon after the couple reunites in early 2006, Babe and Little Adam are kidnapped by Amanda's mother, Janet Dillon (Kate Collins), who makes it appear as if Babe has run off with the boy. JR, feeling betrayed again, begins drinking and becomes violent, resorting to holding Krystal (Bobbie Eakes), Babe's mother, at gunpoint in order to find Babe. Babe is shown fantasizing that JR will rescue her. Her innocence is proven, though, when she is finally rescued from Janet by others along with JR. She then forgives JR for his doubts about her. The two remarry. They enjoy a blissful getaway to the south of France for their honeymoon. JR wishes upon a shooting star that their romantic love for each other will never die; Babe wishes the same. Despite all this, their happiness after France is short-lived. When JR discovers his long estranged mother, Dixie Cooney (Cady McClain), is still alive and has purposely stayed "dead", JR shuts himself off from everyone and begins drinking again. Not wanting Babe to do to Little Adam what was done to him by Dixie, his suspicions of Babe lead him to plot to kill her, in what he believes is the only way to save his son from her havoc. His longtime best friend, Kendall Hart (Alicia Minshew), is caught in his trap instead and falls into a coma while pregnant. Babe, while eavesdropping on a one-sided conversation JR is having with a comatose Kendall, soon discovers that JR has tried to murder her. She then confronts him about it. JR is arrested and put in jail, but his uncle Stuart Chandler (David Canary) helps JR and Babe reconcile. JR decides to take responsibility for his crime, but ultimately Babe's testimony sets JR free. She lies in court to keep him from prison, and the two set out to start fresh.

Babe grows close to a man named Josh Madden (Colin Egglesfield) in mid 2006. Some time after she has sex with Josh, Josh tells JR, and when Babe admits the truth, JR again goes on a drunken rampage. He angrily goes in search of Josh, but after being cornered by Bianca and Erica Kane (Susan Lucci), he jumps through a window and slams into the patio below, nearly killing himself.

Josh finds JR on the ground bleeding to death, and though initially torn about whether to save his enemy or having Babe to himself, he opts to save JR's life. A recovering JR expresses that he hates Babe, but Tad Martin (Michael E. Knight)'s words help him to again rekindle his love for Babe. Things between JR and Babe slowly improve, until Babe's bodyguard tells JR that he spotted Babe and Josh kissing on New Year's Eve. JR then calls his lawyer to find out how to get full custody of Little Adam.

With the start of 2007, a serial killer is on the loose in Pine Valley, killing the women of Fusion Cosmetics. Once Babe passes on eating a stack of pancakes secretly meant for her by the Satin Slayer, and Dixie eats them instead, Tad and JR rush to Dixie's bedside at P.V. Hospital where she dies. JR says an emotional goodbye to his mother, returns to her a necklace in which she adored, and cries in his wife's arms.

JR is beyond despair, but rather than drinking his sorrows away, he talks about his feelings in great detail to Babe, something which Babe has always wanted from him. Babe blames herself for Dixie's death. JR assures her that he would never wish her dead in his mother's place, but when he catches Babe and Josh kissing in a shed, he forces her to choose between her mother's secret of being pregnant with Tad's baby or custody of Little Adam. Babe pleads with JR that the kiss he witnessed was just a goodbye kiss, and that she is still very much in love with him, but JR does not believe her. Babe is devastated when JR verbally lashes out that she should have died instead of Dixie.

My mother died in your place! She's dead because of you... All because you couldn't eat your favorite pancake breakfast. Your stupid favorite breakfast. No, 'ruin lives'? You should be in the ground, not her! And I wish to hell you were.

His words stick painfully on Babe's mind. In the parking garage of Chandler Enterprises, Babe's bodyguard is killed and Babe is attacked by the Satin Slayer. JR does not believe that Babe has been attacked at first, thinking that it is just a ploy. When Tad, however, relays to him that it is the truth, he quickly rushes to P.V. Hospital. Just as he does, Babe flatlines, experiencing her life flash before her eyes; the images are of her mother, her son, and JR, noticeably ending on a final flash where Babe is in France with JR overlooking a balcony in what she describes as the happiest day of her life. JR makes it to the hospital a little after Krystal and Adam do, but soon after that, Babe is declared dead in the operating room. She "dies" loving JR.

It is later revealed that although Babe was attacked by the Satin Slayer, she did not die. Josh has saved her, with the help of Zach Slater (Thorsten Kaye), Kendall, Jackson Montgomery (Walt Willey), Joe Martin (Ray MacDonnell) and Jeff Martin (John James). It was Zach's idea to fake Babe's death, and Jeff and Joe who saved her life by implanting a pacemaker within her heart to regulate it. Josh gets most of the credit due to his constant vigil at her bedside. To fake Babe's death, they slowed down her heart-rate, causing her to go into a coma and then they moved her to Zach's casino. Josh pretends to skip town out of his "heart-breaking loss" of Babe. JR mourns, and the serial killer is soon discovered to be Alexander Cambias Sr. (Ronald Guttman), Zach's biological father. Babe stays at Zach's casino where, through Josh's lies, she is led to believe that she is in a real hospital and that JR does not care about her.

JR is eventually reunited with Babe and apologizes to her for how he treated her before her "death", but Babe expresses that although she will always be in love with JR, being separated as lovers is the only way to ensure no more severe pain between them. She also reasons that it will give their son a better shot at a stable life not brought up in a war-zone between two bickering parents. Joint custody of Little Adam is what both agree to.

JR and Babe lead separate lives for a while. However, on November 2, 2007, as they later bond over old times while talking at the bar The Comeback, their connection draws them together once more. Babe sees a more mature side to JR, and after she offers him a ride home, the two cannot stop the pull that is apparent between them. With the sexual tension intensifying, and JR saying that he misses kissing her, the two make love for the first time since their divorce. Despite this reunion of sorts, Babe tells JR that it was just a one-time deal and says that she is not in love with him anymore. JR is left devastated, and even after Babe apologizes for hurting him in this way, he sulks in despair and begins drinking again.

JR goes through a brief time of having lost himself and again battling legal troubles. Months later, he is back on track with his life and has reconciled with Babe, though the two still do not continue their romance. On January 10, 2008, they go out for a snowday with Little Adam and have fun building a snowman, throwing snowballs and enjoying each other's company. The two express that they like being a family, just them and Little Adam. When JR talks of being a better man, one that Babe can possibly like again, the two nearly kiss. Babe stops the intimate encounter before it can happen and reminds JR that when they become romantic with each other, it never lasts and ends in destruction. JR tells Babe that he loves her and asks her to give them another chance, but as friends first and see where it leads. Babe, hesitant at first, accepts his request.

When it is discovered that Richie Novak (Billy Miller), recent but former love interest of Babe, needs a bone marrow transplant, she goes on a mission to save his life. She secretly discovers that JR is the perfect bone marrow match for him. Aware that the two are enemies, she makes a deal with JR on February 19, 2008, after informing him that he is a bone marrow match for Richie. The deal comes in the form of strip poker. If Babe wins, JR will save Richie's life. If JR wins, Babe will give JR anything he wants regards to her. The two play the game at Babe's place, where Babe loses. Babe naked, and JR half naked, Babe grabs a robe just as JR surprises her by revealing that he already knew of his bone marrow status before she told him, and that he already planned to donate to Richie. He says he cannot let a man die without reason. Babe is touched by JR's words, and the two flirt. They soon embrace and make love, unaware that Richie has also just discovered that JR is a bone marrow match and has sent thugs to capture JR in order to take his bone marrow any way viable.

JR is diagnosed with Hepatitis A not long after Richie steals his bone marrow. Babe soon realizes the truth that Richie set up JR, and JR later saves Babe from being raped by two guys when she goes undercover as a prostitute to clear JR's name and find out what crimes Richie did. Richie schemes with his sister, Annie Lavery (Melissa Claire Egan), to kill Greenlee Smythe (Rebecca Budig) as a favor for Annie, but due to his own selfish needs he instead kidnaps Babe and tells her that he is in love with her. Babe is disgusted by his actions. She is later rescued by Kendall and Greenlee; they knock Richie out and tie him up. A little while afterwards, Richie is freed by Annie while Kendall and Greenlee are distracted, but Annie later kills him out of frustration. His death sparks a murder mystery.

JR and Babe (now portrayed by Baker) become closer and reunite romantically. JR teams up with his father, Adam, just like old times. Their goal is to take down Fusion Cosmetics. JR tries to enlist Babe into their scheme. What JR does not know, though, is that Adam is secretly planning to ruin him in the process. JR and Babe bond, as Adam plans the ultimate takeover. Fusion Cosmetics is at a height of excellence and things are working wonderfully. Babe and JR decide to use "Bella" (a new perfume designed by Babe) to launch her career. They begin to plan their next wedding and decide to have a second child. Adam has a plan of his own with the assistance of Pete Cortlandt (Daniel Kennedy), who taints the Bella perfume at the launch party. Colby (Brianne Moncrief), JR's sister, gets sick, but no one notices that it is due to the perfume. Greenlee later gets sick, but calls it the flu. When a wedding party arrives at P.V. Hospital, Angie Hubbard says that it is a toxin in Bella that is causing the sickness. The U.S. Food and Drug Administration (FDA) then shuts Fusion Cosmetics temporarily down. While Adam is encouraging lawsuits against Fusion, Babe resigns and tells the company to blame the Bella scandal on her. She also admits that she and JR were planning to take over. She has an ulterior motive, as her and JR are planning to move to San Diego anyway. However, they have to come back when Adam has them subpoenaed to the Bella trial. JR and Babe do not make it to the trial, as they are caught up in a series of tornadoes that strike Pine Valley. Babe sacrifices herself to keep Little Adam from dying, making her internal and external bleeding worse. While in the hospital, she asks JR to marry her. They cannot find a minister as Babe is running out of time before she loses her life, but they exchange vows, regardless, alone in the hospital's chapel. They kiss, declare that they made each other better people and that they love each other from the deepest part of their souls; that their love will never stop, no matter what. After a light hug, Babe dies in JR's arms.

== Reception and impact ==
=== Popularity ===
In 2006, JR and Babe's second wedding was anticipated among viewers; this anticipation received attention outside of the soap opera medium when the fictional couple was featured in the magazine Celebrity Living, previously known for articles on celebrities such as Tom Cruise and Katie Holmes, Nick Lachey and Jessica Simpson, etc. Bannered as exclusive coverage, detail such as "Babe's Beauty Bridal Shower!" was included. In 2007, author Jeremy G. Butler analyzed aspects of the romance in his book Critical methods and applications, and the pairing was named a supercouple by People magazine in 2011.

The romance remained a popular pairing in polls conducted by magazines such as Soap Opera Digest and Soaps in Depth. Fans were known to send in balloons "and cute things [to] the studio" to show their support for the pairing. In mid 2007, supporters of the couple, self-declared as "Jabeaholics," ordered a cake for the characters' portrayers praising JR and Babe as best couple of the year. However, resentment from viewers plagued the couple that same year. Character Dixie Cooney Martin's death by the "Satin Slayer" serial killer upset viewers and became one of the genre's most controversial storylines. The writers decided to kill off Dixie in place of Babe.

=== Attempted murder debate and alcoholism ===
In 2006, a few months after their second wedding, JR tries to murder Babe (see above); among viewers, this furthered an older debate about female characters remaining romantically linked to men who have tried to physically harm them in the past. JR's murder attempt was not the first occurrence of a character in a daytime drama trying to murder the love of his life. General Hospital's Alan Quartermaine of the couple Alan and Monica tries the same thing with his true love several times. Journalist and blogger Ben Bryant noted, "ABC in particular, has seen the unpredictable rise of 'anti-leading' men, including two wildly popular characters with rapist pasts: Anthony Geary's 'Luke Spencer' on General Hospital, and Roger Howarth (later Trevor St. John)'s 'Todd Manning' on One Life to Live. Is it the appeal (or at least promise) of 'redemption via a good woman's love' or the age-old affinity for the 'bad boy,' that draws..."

In early 2007, JR and Babe's tempestuous romance received notice by TV Guide's Daniel R. Coleridge, who published an exclusive interview with Babe's former portrayer, Alexa Havins, and queried her about the matter. Coleridge cited the marriage as dysfunctional and seemed perplexed as to why Babe would stay with a man who tried to kill her, and as he put it, "verbally abuses her all the time". Havins addressed deeper issues about the coupling:

I know. I asked if we could do a PSA (Public service announcement) for women in abusive relationships to get help, but that didn't happen. I was concerned about how viewers might be influenced by Babe saying, 'Oh, it's OK, JR, you only tried to kill me because you were drinking.' What if a woman decided to ignore the warning signs of abuse and stay in a bad relationship, and then a true tragedy happened?

Despite concerns by Havins, fans of the romance continued to support the pairing. Havins, cautious but appreciative in regards to the couple's popularity, expressed thanks for the support. Even though the network produced an alternative coupling for Babe with Babe and Josh, which was set as a healthier love story, it had the opposite effect on viewers, who saw Josh's need and "love" for Babe as an obsession reminiscent of a stalker. Coleridge, on the other hand, saw Josh as a better choice for Babe and found it difficult to blame Babe for her one-night stand/emotional affair with him. Havins disagreed about the cheating, but touched on the importance of needing a change for the love story: "Babe's affair was wrong. But her marriage to JR is just a really volatile, unhealthy relationship at this point. Some extreme changes need to be made. It can't just be JR saying 'I'm sorry' until the next thing happens. We've heard that before."

Magazine Soaps In Depth provided deeper insight into the murder attempt. They cited JR's motivation for the crime and the reason why viewers were able to still embrace the character:

JR's darkest hour proved to be Young's shining moment. The scene where he confessed his crime to a comatose Kendall — his best friend and the unintentioned victim of the trap he'd set for Babe — was a marvel. Oozing agony, he explained what motivated the perversely well-intentioned stunt. Babe's love 'was just a con,' he said, his voice breaking. He had to eliminate her before she made Little Adam a target. 'It's a lot better for him,' JR continued, struggling to remain even but losing the bid to shield himself from the hurt that was swallowing him whole, 'to love a perfect mother that's gone than to believe a mother who's just gonna break his heart... She would be gone, but we would still have the memories. All that love, all good. I could raise my son on that.' It's a tough logic to sell, but Young's impactful exposure of JR's internal ruin enabled us to understand (though not condone) his actions. And that we still root for him to heal, perhaps more than ever, is compelling proof of Young's artistry.

Young's portrayal of an alcoholic battling his inner demons was noted as realistic and compelling; the theme resulted in notice by the NIH's National Institute on Drug Abuse (also known as NIDA), which supports productions and performances featuring the accurate depiction of drug, alcohol and tobacco use, addiction, and mental health. NIDA noted that Young was nominated for the 11th Annual PRISM Awards under the title of TV Daytime Drama Series Multi-Episode Storyline as All My Children: JR's Alcoholism.

== See also ==
- List of supercouples
