= Martin family (All My Children) =

Fictional characters

- All My Children family
- First appearance: January 5, 1970
- Last appearance: September 2, 2013
- Created by: Agnes Nixon
- Introduced by: Bud Kloss
- Duration: 1970–2011, 2013

The Martin family is a fictional family on the popular ABC daytime soap opera, All My Children.

The Martin family have been the cornerstone of Pine Valley since All My Children’s inception in 1970. Even before Joe Martin married Ruth Martin, Kate Martin was a symbol of stability and strong family values. Nowadays, Joe spends his days balancing his work as a doctor, and the tumultuous love lives of his many children and grandchildren. As of 2009, Joe and Ruth Martin have since retired and moved to Florida.

== Descendants ==
- Henry Martin (deceased); married Kate Martin (dissolved)
  - Joe Martin; Henry and Kate's son; married Helen Martin (widowed), Ruth Parker (1972–)
    - Jeff Martin; Joe and Helen's son; married Erica Kane (1971–74), Mary Kennicott (1974), Chris Karrass (1978–2006)
      - Joshua "Josh" Madden (1980–2009); Jeff and Erica's son
    - Tara Martin; Joe and Helen's daughter; married Chuck Tyler (1972–75), Phillip Brent (1976–81), Jim Jefferson (1981)
      - Charlie Brent (1972–); Tara and Phillip's son; married Cecily Davidson (1995–)
        - Nick Brent (1995–); Charlie and Cecily's son
        - Philip Joseph Brent, II (2000–); Charlie and Cecily's son
      - Kelsey Jefferson (1985–); Tara and Jim's daughter; married Bobby Warner (1996–97)
        - Sam Grey (1990–); Kelsey and Bobby's son
    - Bobby Martin; Joe and Helen's son (who went to the attic in search of his skis and has never been seen or missed since)
    - Tad Martin; Joe and Ruth's adopted son; married Dottie Thornton (1984–85), Hillary Wilson (1986), Dixie Cooney (1989–90, 1994–96, 1999–2002), Brooke English (1993–94), Krystal Carey (2007–09)
      - Damon Miller; Tad and Hillary's son
      - Jamie Martin (1984–); Tad and Brooke's son
      - Kathy Martin (2002–); Tad and Dixie's daughter
      - Jennifer Colby Martin (2007–); Tad and Krystal's daughter
    - Jake Martin (1979–); Joe and Ruth's son; married Emily Ann Sago (1990–91), Gillian Andrassy (2000–01), Dr. Carolyn Finn (2003–08), Amanda Dillon (2009–)
      - Trevor Martin (2009–); Jake and Amanda's son
  - Paul Martin; Henry and Kate's son; married Anne Tyler (1972–74, 1976–81), Margo Flax (1974–76)
    - Beth Martin (1976–77); Paul and Anne's daughter

== Family tree ==
Henry Martin	Kate Martin
Helen Martin	Joe Martin	Ruth Brent	Paul Martin	Anne Tyler
Jeff Martin	Erica Kane	Bobby Martin	Phil Brent	Tara Martin	Jim Jefferson	Jake Martin	Amanda Dillon	Brooke English	Tad Martin (adopted)	Dixie Cooney	Hillary Wilson	Krystal Carey	Beth Martin
Josh Madden	Cecily Davidson	Charlie Brent	Kelsey Jefferson	Bobby Warner	Trevor Martin	Jamie Martin	Kathy Martin	Damon Miller	Jenny Martin
Nick Brent	Phil Brent II	Sam Grey
