= Kate Martin (All My Children) =

- All My Children character
- Portrayed by: Christine Thomas (1970); Kate Harrington (1970); Kay Campbell (1970–1985)
- Duration: 1970–1985
- First appearance: January 5, 1970
- Last appearance: May 30, 1985
- Created by: Agnes Nixon
In-universe information
- Occupation: Housewife
- Husband: Henry Martin (1927–1959)
- Sons: Joe Martin; Paul Martin
- Grandsons: Jeff Martin; Bobby Martin; Tad Martin (adoptive); Jake Martin; Josh Madden (great); Charlie Brent (great); Damon Miller (great; adoptive); Jamie Martin (great; adoptive); Trevor Martin (great); Sam Grey (great-great)
- Granddaughters: Tara Martin; Beth Martin; Kelsey Jefferson (great); Kathy Martin (great; adoptive); Jenny Martin (great; adoptive)

Kate Martin is a fictional character on the soap opera, All My Children. She was played by Christine Thomas from January to early February 1970, then by Kate Harrington from February to October 1970, and finally by Kay Campbell, from October 1970 to April 1985.

She was the matriarch of the Martin family, wife of Henry Martin and mother of Joe and Paul Martin. She was usually found in the kitchen cooking some of her famous recipes or offering sensible advice to Tad.

== Storylines ==
Kate Martin suffered many tragedies around the same time, including the death of her husband, Henry Martin; the loss of her daughter-in-law, Helen; and the devastating news that her son, Paul, was missing in action in Vietnam. Her elder son, Joe, moved his family back to Pine Valley as response to Helen's death. Kate filled the maternal void after Helen's death. With her newfound family, the good news began to flood in. Paul was recovered in Vietnam, and soon set up shop as an attorney in Pine Valley.

Kate tried to keep herself out of the Martin family drama. Tara had turned to her with apprehensions about marrying Chuck Tyler, but Kate could provide no definitive answer. Nor was Kate able to explain why Jeff Martin would rush into a sudden marriage with Erica Kane. Phoebe Tyler came to Kate with an idea to set up her daughter, Anne Tyler, with Paul. Kate disapproved of Phoebe's intervention in Tara and Chuck's relationship, and was not about to help her weed in Paul's life. She was not going to play matchmaker to her son, and told Phoebe that she should do the same for her daughter.

Kate welcomed Ruth Parker Brent into the Martin household. She passed on the reins of Martin matriarch to Ruth after her wedding to Joe. In Ruth, she did not only gain a new daughter-in-law, but a new best friend.

Kate worried that Joe and Ruth's marriage was doomed. Ruth kept the secret about little Phillip Tyler's paternity for so long. Kate had never seen Joe so angry before either. Kate knew it was best to keep out of their affairs. Instead, she focused her attention on Tad, who was now going to be adopted by the elder Martins.

Kate worried about her son’s marriage. The once peaceful Martin home was at war over Tara and Phil. Kate invited Dan Kennicott to move in with the Martins while he attended Pine Valley University. She hoped his presence would calm Joe and Ruth down enough to speak with each other.

Joe lay near death when he was struck with appendicitis. By his bedside, Kate witnessed Ruth and Joe reconcile. All the Martins came together for the long anticipated Christmastime wedding of Tara and Phil.

When Ruth and Joe learned they were expecting a child, everyone rejoiced. Ruth was concerned over the dangers to the child because of her advanced age. Kate calmed her fears, telling her to wait for test results before making any assumptions about the baby’s health. All the tests indicated that she was going to have a perfectly healthy child. That Christmas, Joseph "Joey" Martin, Jr. was born.

Kate caught Tad stealing money from her sugar bowl. Kate confronted him and he admitted he was going to use the cash to buy drugs. His erratic behavior only increased. When he accidentally crashed the family station wagon, Tad decided to run away from home, breaking Kate’s heart.

Kate was taking care of Joey when he found Ruth’s gun. She had bought it to protect herself from Ray. Joey accidentally shot Kate, not knowing the gun was real. Luckily, the wound was not life-threatening. The accident convinced Ruth to get rid of the gun and not live in fear of Ray’s return.

But Ray was able to manage an early parole. Kate was able to intervene when he came to the Martin home to confront Ruth. That New Year’s Eve, Greg Nelson rushed into the home claiming Ray had planted a bomb to explode under the Martin home. At that moment, an explosion occurred outside. Ray had run away with the bomb after learning his daughter, Jenny Gardner, was staying over at the Martin home.

The Martins welcomed Tad back to Pine Valley.

Her final scenes aired on April 30, 1985, in which she was seen cooking some stew for her grandson, Tad.

On the night of July 15–16, 1985, Kate died in her sleep. All of the Martins returned to say farewell to their beloved matriarch.
