= Tad Martin =

- All My Children character
- Michael E. Knight as Tad Martin
- Portrayed by: Matthew Anton (1972–1977); John E. Dunn (1978–1981); Michael E. Knight (1983–1990, 1992–2013); Terrell Anthony (1990)
- Duration: 1972–1986; 1988–1990; 1992–2011; 2013
- First appearance: November 14, 1972
- Last appearance: September 2, 2013
- Created by: Agnes Nixon
- Introduced by: Agnes Nixon and Bud Kloss (1972); Stephen Schenkel (1988); Felicia Minei Behr (1992); Ginger Smith (2013)
- Crossover appearances: One Life to Live
In-universe information
- Other names: Thaddeus James Gardner; Ted Orsini; Thaddeus James Martin
- Occupation: Ordained minister; Private Investigator; Businessman; Talk show host
- Family: Martin
- Parents: Ray Gardner; Opal Cortlandt
- Adoptive parents: Joe Martin; Ruth Martin
- Brothers: Jake Martin (adoptive)
- Sisters: Jenny Gardner
- Half-brothers: Adrian Sword; Peter Cortlandt; Jeff Martin (adoptive); Phil Brent (adoptive); Bobby Martin (adoptive)
- Half-sisters: Tara Martin (adoptive)
- Spouse: Dottie Thornton (1984–1985); Hillary Wilson (1986–1987); Dixie Cooney (1989–1990, 1994–1996, 1999–2002, 2013–); Brooke English (1993–1994); Krystal Carey (2007–2009); Cara Castillo (2011)
- Children: Jamie Martin; Damon Miller; Kathy Martin; Jenny Martin
- Stepsons: JR Chandler
- Grandparents: Henry Martin (adoptive); Kate Martin (adoptive)
- Aunts and uncles: Rob Gardner; Paul Martin (adoptive); Amy Tyler (adoptive)
- Nieces and nephews: Josh Madden (adoptive); Charlie Brent (adoptive); Kelsey Jefferson (adoptive); Trevor Martin (adoptive)
- First cousins: Beth Martin (adoptive); Phil Brent (adoptive)

Tad Martin is a fictional character from the American daytime drama, All My Children. Tad was played by three actors, according to the age of the character: Matthew Anton, John E. Dunn, and Michael E. Knight. Knight has portrayed the role on and off from 1983 until the series finale in 2011. Tad represents the good on the show, often butting heads with "villains" like Adam Chandler. He is perhaps the best male friend to Erica Kane. His relationship with Dixie Cooney made them a favorite of fans, reaching supercouple status. Under secrecy, Knight returned for the first-season finale of Prospect Park's version of All My Children on September 2, 2013.

== Development and casting ==
Portrayer Michael E. Knight was surprised at the reaction he got during the Tad the Cad era. In 1984, he said, "It's so weird. I'm playing a jerk. No one should like Tad Martin. But the letters I get...I feel like writing back and saying, 'Don't you see, people like that can only hurt you. You don't aspire to be like them."

Knight has won three Daytime Emmys for his portrayal of Tad Martin. He won the Daytime Emmy Awards for Outstanding Younger Actor twice in 1986 and 1987, and won the Supporting Actor trophy in 2001. He is one of the very few actors to be nominated in younger, supporting, and lead actor categories, all while portraying the same character.

In 2021, Wally Kurth revealed that he had auditioned for the role of Tad.

== Storylines ==
Thaddeus James "Tad" Gardner is written into All My Children November 14, 1972. Tad (then Matthew Anton), whose birthdate is noted as September 1, 1963, is beaten and abandoned (off-screen) by his biological father Ray Gardner (Gil Rogers). Tad is found in a Pine Valley park by Dr. Jeff Martin (Charles Frank) and his fiancée, nurse Mary Kennicott (Susan Blanchard), who become Tad's foster parents. When Mary is killed during a home invasion, Jeff asks his parents, Dr. Joe (Ray MacDonnell) and nurse Ruth Martin (Mary Fickett), and grandmother, Kate Martin (Kay Campbell), to care for Tad. Ray returns and tries to sell Tad to the Martins for $15,000. Angered at their refusal to pay, Ray rapes Ruth. When Ray is sent to prison for the crime, Tad is formally adopted by the Martins. He develops a close relationship with his adoptive grandmother. But despite this, Tad (then John E. Dunn) proves to be a rebellious teenager. In 1981, he steals the Martins' car, and runs away from home for two years.

Tad (Michael E. Knight onward, except for a brief appearance by Terrell Anthony in 1990) returns to Pine Valley January 19, 1983, SORASed to age 20. He gets a job modeling for Olga Swenson (Peg Murray). He is nicknamed "Tad the Cad" because he seduces and dumps many women. He is once caught in Erica Kane's bedroom with another model, which costs him his job. He begins seeing Liza Colby (Marcy Walker, briefly Alice Haining in 1984), a rival of his biological sister, Jenny Gardner (Kim Delaney) for the affections of Greg Nelson (Laurence Lau). Tad has a simultaneous affair with Liza's mother, Marian Colby (Jennifer Bassey) which is eventually discovered by a furious Liza.

In 1984, Edna Thornton Ferguson (Sandy Gabriel) pays Tad to date her daughter, Dottie Thornton (Tasia Valenza) at the same time, he falls in love with Hillary Wilson (Carmen Thomas), step-daughter of town matriarch Phoebe Tyler Wallingford (Ruth Warrick) and daughter of Langley Wallingford (Louis Edmonds) Tad's sister Jenny is killed in a jet ski explosion, and Hillary reaches out to help him cope with his loss, but encourages him to do right by Dottie when he gets her pregnant. Tad and Hillary end their relationship, and he marries Dottie. She has miscarried, but hides this from him as she knows he would not marry her otherwise. Meanwhile, Hillary captures the attention of Tad's friend, Bob Georgia (Peter Strong) who soon learns he is terminally ill. She agrees to marry him to make his last days happy. Before the wedding, he discovers he was misdiagnosed and is not going to die, but keeps quiet because he fears losing Hillary to Tad, who is now having his marriage to Dottie annulled after discovering her deception.

In 1985, Tad's beloved grandmother Kate dies. He later finds out that Bob is lying about his condition, leading to Hillary and Bob's divorce. She and Tad marry in 1986. Hillary discovers con artist Wade Matthews (Christopher Holder) has evil intentions toward her stepmother, Phoebe, and that Tad knows but is keeping it secret under threat of blackmail. Between the stress of this revelation and Hillary's focus on law school, Tad succumbs to the attentions of a lounge singer, who is revealed to be Adam Chandler's estranged daughter, Skye Chandler (Antoinette Byron, then Robin Christopher) despite desperate attempts to gain Hillary's forgiveness after she finds out about Tad's infidelity, she ends their marriage. A broken-hearted Tad leaves Pine Valley in 1986 to make a fresh start.

Tad returns to Pine Valley in 1988. He quickly has an affair with Barbara Montgomery (Susan Pratt), and then meets billionaire Adam's (David Canary) new maid, Dixie Cooney (Cady McClain). Adam hires Dixie, the niece of his bitter business rival Palmer Cortlandt (James Mitchell), with the ulterior motive of producing a son, an heir to the Chandler fortune. His affair with Dixie ruins his marriage with Brooke English (Julia Barr). Adam and Dixie then marry, with Dixie giving birth to their son, Adam Chandler Jr. (called Junior as a child, JR as a teen and adult). Dixie falls in love with Tad. They begin an affair. When Adam finds out, he gaslights Dixie and commits her to a mental institution, getting custody of their son. Tad rescues Dixie from the institution and helps her win back custody of Junior. They marry in 1989, but the marriage does not last long.

Tad's biological mother, Opal Cortlandt (now Jill Larson), returns to Pine Valley, and helps Palmer break up the couple. They pay a woman to tell Dixie that she slept with Tad, leading to Dixie separating from him. Devastated, Tad falls into an affair with Brooke. Dixie finds out and divorces him. Shortly thereafter, the evil pimp Billy Clyde Tuggle (Matthews Cowles), who is obsessed with Dixie, kidnaps her in an effort to force her to marry him. Tad rescues Dixie, and they realize they still love each other and make plans to remarry. On their wedding day, Tad and Billy Clyde get into a fight. They both fall off a bridge into the river. Only Billy Clyde's body is found, and it is assumed that Tad is dead. His "death" rocks both Dixie and Brooke. Brooke had been told she would never be able to conceive another child, but discovers she is pregnant by Tad, and has a son, who she calls Jamie (for Tad's middle name of James). She initially keeps the identity of Jamie's father a secret from all but her aunt Phoebe, but eventually shares the news with Tad's loved ones.

Meanwhile, Tad drags himself from the river, with no memory of who he is, and hitchhikes to California. He gets a job at Orsini Vineyards, where the owner, Nola Orsini (Barbara Rush), says that he is the spitting image of her missing son, Ted Orsini, who was kidnapped as a child, and insists Tad is him. She takes him in, trains him to run the vineyards, and makes him her heir, completely convinced he is her lost son. Tad (as Ted) is doing business in New York City with Dimitri Marick (Michael Nader) and is invited to Wildwind, the Marick estate in Pine Valley. Nola accompanies "Ted" on the visit to Pine Valley and becomes gravely ill, ending up in the hospital. While being treated, Nola meets and befriends Dixie - completely unaware Dixie is the mystery woman "Ted" is having memories of. During this visit to Pine Valley, "Ted" only ever encounters residents who never met Tad and very narrowly avoids meeting with any of Tad's loved ones. The only exception was an incident where "Ted" rescues Junior in the park; Junior recognizes him as Tad, but "Ted" leaves the scene before running into anyone else who would recognize him. Nola eventually puts it all together but before she can tell Tad, she dies of heart failure - leaving Tad her fortune. Concurrently, "Ted" meets investigative reporter (and Brooke's fiancé) Edmund Grey (John Callahan) and asks him to look into the name Billy Clyde Tuggle, a name "Ted" is remembering but doesn't know why. Edmund eventually discovers "Ted" might actually be Tad and shares this information with Brooke. Brooke travels to Napa Valley, CA for Nola's funeral hoping to determine if "Ted" is Tad. Brooke sees him and discovers that he is really Tad. She helps him to regain his memory and introduces him to Jamie. Meeting up with Dixie again, his feelings for her return, but they decide that he belongs with his son and Brooke.

The real Ted Orsini (also Michael E. Knight) eventually arrives in Pine Valley, showing up injured at a cabin Dixie is staying in while sorting out her feelings for Tad. Dixie initially believes he is Tad, causing her to miss Tad and Brooke's wedding which she intended to prevent by telling Tad she loves him. Brooke and Tad marry, but the union is doomed from the start due to the unresolved feelings Tad and Dixie share. Ted and Tad face off several times, with the ever-scowling Ted expressing his resentment over what he perceived as Tad usurping a life that was rightfully Ted's. Dixie spends a fair amount of time during this period trying to convince the residents of Pine Valley that Ted is misunderstood, but eventually even she realizes he is a lost cause. After one last standoff between Ted and Tad in Canada, Ted is shot and never seen or heard from again. Tad and Dixie embark on an affair that eventually causes an acrimonious end of his marriage to Brooke. At this same time, Brooke discovers she is pregnant again by Tad. She initially hopes this news might sway Tad's feelings about ending their marriage, but the pregnancy is discovered to be ectopic and is terminated to save Brooke's life. Brooke eventually realizes the marriage won't work, and tells Tad to go back to Dixie. Tad and Dixie get married for the second time in 1994.

Tad falls back into his old ways and has an affair with Liza. He and Dixie divorce again and she moves back to her hometown of Pigeon Hollow, WV. Tad strikes up a renewed friendship with Dixie's good friend, nurse Gloria Marsh (Teresa Blake). The relationship soon blossoms into a romantic one. Dimitri seduces Gloria away from Tad and back into his life. Gloria defends Dimitri's unsavory actions to Tad unwaveringly. The final straw for Gloria comes when Tad and Dimitri's half-brother Edmund trick Dimitri into confessing all of his misdeeds, and she overhears the entire conversation. Enraged at his deception, Gloria leaves him. Later on, after apologizing to Tad for being so taken in by Dimitri's lies, Gloria leaves town to sort out her life.

In 1998, Adam Chandler wants Adam Jr. to come home, and along with him comes Dixie, who refuses to have anything to do with Tad at first. Tad's biological mother Opal had married Dixie's uncle Palmer, and when things start to sour in their marriage, Tad and Dixie get together to help them out. After tailing Palmer to New York City, they find themselves sharing a hotel room. Their true feelings for each other surface. Needing time to think things out, they make a plan to meet at the top of the Statler Building if they each decide they really love each other and want to be together. Tad sits waiting for hours to see if she would show, but, while on her way to meet him, she fell ill. Tad believes she did not come because she decided she did not want to reconcile. Dixie cares so much for Tad that she does not want to burden him with her health problems – a failed kidney and a weak heart. With Liza's help, he soon learns about Dixie's condition and goes to her. He stays by her side, proving his undying love, and once again proposing marriage to her. She accepts, and in 1999, Tad and Dixie marry for the third time.

Liza marries Adam, and when they began having problems, Tad conspires with her to successfully take over control of Chandler Enterprises. Dixie becomes pregnant. Knowing it could kill her, she decides to keep the pregnancy from Tad because she knew he would tell her to terminate it for her health's sake. He did eventually find out, and accepts her decision to carry the baby, but she miscarries. Dixie then takes a job working as an assistant for renowned cardiologist Dr. David Hayward (Vincent Irizarry) at the hospital. Tad, knowing a cad when he sees one, becomes wary of David's constant need for Dixie's assistance. Tad has the opportunity to meet David's lawyer, Leslie Coulson (Colleen Dion). She turns out to be the little sister of one of Tad's old high school girlfriends and reveals that she always had a crush on him. Soon, with Leslie's unrequited love for Tad and David's obsession with Dixie, the happy reunion of Tad and Dixie begins to crumble. With a little help from David's experimental drug, Libidizone, Leslie and David's little plan works like a charm. At a party where David dumps his sex drug into the punch, Leslie lures Tad to bed. Although he cannot recall sleeping with Leslie, it still accomplishes its goal to put another wedge in the relationship of Tad and Dixie. Dixie grows closer to David, unaware of what actually happened. When all is revealed, Dixie leaves David and goes back to Tad. Leslie goes crazy and is sent away to a rest home. Later, Tad brings Leslie back to town to help him get even with David, but instead Leslie attacks Tad and almost kills him. Dixie, not understanding how Tad could have brought the menacing Leslie back into their lives for something as stupid as revenge, loses her trust in Tad once more, and they divorce again in January 2002.

Shortly after the divorce, Dixie and Tad reunite again, and Dixie becomes pregnant. David secretly arranges for her to stay at a special clinic in Switzerland. Tad and JR (Dixie's son, then Jonathan Bennett) are puzzled by her sudden disappearance. When Dixie is close to her delivery date, and everything is going well health-wise, she decides to tell Tad everything, and they make arrangements for him to be there for the birth of their daughter. As Tad goes to the airport, heading for Zürich, Opal receives a phone call and rushes to tell Brooke the horrible news. Brooke hurries to board the plane to tell Tad that there has been an auto accident and Dixie has been killed. The car has gone over a cliff and they couldn't find her body. Tad is devastated. Stuck to his seat, unable to move from shock, the two of them head for Switzerland. They go to Dixie's apartment, where they find that she had prepared a special evening. A framed baby sonogram sits on the table with the name "Kate Martin" on it. They gather up Dixie's things and return home. Tad takes a long time to mourn the death of his beloved Dixie and their unborn daughter.

In 2003, Tad begins to emerge from his dark place when he enlists his investigator skills to help Brooke find out if Maria Santos Grey (Eva La Rue) is still alive. The woman known as Maureen Gorman does indeed turn out to be Maria, and now he must find out how she lost her memory and who could have saved her from the plane crash. When it is revealed that David Hayward is involved, Tad and most of Pine Valley go after him. David found Maria and gave her his experimental drugs to save her life, then sent her away and gave her a new name to protect himself. When David is freed from the criminal charges filed against him, Tad is furious. He really wants to see David behind bars for good. Tad decides to start up his private investigating business again after Adam fires him from his position at Chandler Enterprises. Liza has a new business venture with some of the young women of Pine Valley, Fusion, and soon calls on Tad for help. Doing research for Fusion, he gets to know the girls there well, and finds himself slightly smitten with the marketing director, Simone Torres (Terri Ivens), whom Tad sums up as "one hot tamale". The begin a mutually exclusive "booty call" type relationship, all in fun and very hot.

When JR returns home after running off to join the Merchant Marines in the aftermath of his mother's death, he surprises everyone by presenting to them his new wife, Babe Carey (Alexa Havins, later Amanda Baker), a pretty blonde he met in San Diego. Tad discovers that Babe seduced his son Jamie (Micah Alberti, later Justin Bruening) the very night she and JR returned to Pine Valley, and begins to investigate her. He locates her mother, Krystal Carey (Bobbie Eakes), and brings her to Pine Valley. Tad is helping Liza with her Adam problems, and she is finding that her feelings for Tad were returning - and he is feeling some of the same in return, so he is soon involved with both Simone and Liza. With Krystal now in town and involved in the JR/Babe/Jamie triangle, she starts butting heads with Tad. Their fights always seem to turn into hot passion. Tad is dividing his time between three women. When Jamie calls him on how "caddish" that is, Tad breaks it off with all three. His constant association with Krystal makes her too hard to avoid. Tad and Krystal become a couple.

In 2004, Babe and Erica Kane's daughter, Bianca Montgomery (Eden Riegel), are both pregnant, and they go into labor while stranded in a cabin in the woods. Bianca has a girl and Babe a boy. Babe's ex-husband Paul Cramer (Brock Cuchna, later Shane McRae and then David Tom), in a crossover role from One Life to Live, flies his helicopter in to help. He takes Babe's son, telling her Bianca's baby girl is hers and that Bianca's baby has died. Babe, having been drugged, believes this for a while. When she remembers that she did have a boy, and that Bess Chandler must be Bianca's baby, she and Krystal decide to keep up the facade for the sake of JR, who has fallen in love with his "daughter." Tad suggests DNA tests after he suspects the baby might be Bianca's. Krystal switches the results. Tad is convinced and asks Krystal to marry him. She is wracked with guilt and keeps putting him off. When Tad finds out about the deception, he is angry, but decides to keep the secret. To make matters worse, David turns out to be Babe's biological father, and wants to bond with Babe and Krystal. When JR becomes angry at Babe and Jamie for their affair, he divorces her and gets sole custody of Bess. Babe and Krystal discover that Babe's son is still alive, living with Paul's sister Kelly Cramer (Heather Tom) and her husband Kevin Buchanan (Dan Gauthier) in Llanview, Pennsylvania. Jamie and Babe come up with a plan to kidnap her baby back and they set out as fugitives, checking in with Tad and Krystal periodically, as they cross over to One Life to Live. Tad, even though he has mixed feelings, arranges for them to get new ID and passports to get out of the United States. Tad wants to tell Bianca the truth, but Krystal begs him not to. After an altercation with JR, Bianca lays in a coma. Erica feels that being reunited with baby Miranda is the only way to save Bianca. She, Tad, and Adam confront JR with the truth. After Tad takes Bess from JR's arms, JR says that he no longer regards Tad as his father.

Liza contacts Tad after she finds Jamie and Babe hiding in New Orleans. Adam and JR's thugs are closing in. The authorities take the young couple into custody. Tad is facing accessory charges for the kidnapping of Adam Chandler III. Krystal makes a plea-bargain and takes full responsibility for everything. Tad and Krystal spend her last night before prison together. After Edmund Grey is murdered, his son, Sam (Bobby Steggert), begins acting out. Sam is biologically Tad's adoptive great-nephew. Sam wants to learn more about his biological family, so he moves in with the Martins. At the same time, Tad discovers Julia Santos (Sydney Penny) hiding in Wildwind, having escaped Witness Protection to confront the crime lord who killed her husband. Julia and Sam reunite in Tad's attic.

Tad is in for the shock of his life when Diana, the Chandlers' nanny, is revealed to be Dixie. She tells Tad she did not want to come back to Pine Valley because she lost Kate and is not sure if she wants to reunite with Tad. Tad proposes to Krystal again, but it is clear he has feelings for Di. At a memorial service for Kate, Krystal comes in with shocking news. Di is not Dixie, but an inmate Krystal met in prison. Di maintains her identity, even taking a DNA test. Tad continues to believe Di, ending his engagement with Krystal. Di is somehow linked to the crime lord, The Dragon, who wants Julia dead. Di gives Stuart Chandler (David Canary) a note to be given to JR only if she did not come back. Tad convinces Stuart to give him the letter. Tad finds Di and Julia standing over The Dragon's dead body. After making sure Di is safe, Tad reveals he knows the truth. Di is not Dixie, but her younger half-sister. Di's deception further estranges JR and Tad. On Christmas Eve 2005, Di leaves town to visit a very much alive Dixie in Vienna.

Tad tries to push Di away for all the pain she has caused, but he cannot, as he has fallen in love with her. They make plans to marry, but their romance comes to a halt when Tad comes face to face with Dixie at David's cabin, and is overjoyed to see her alive. Di admits that she knew Dixie was alive the whole time. Tad is angry and rejects her. Dixie tells Tad that Kate is alive somewhere. Thinking she was dying after the accident, she signed Kate away to Dr. Greg Madden (Ian Buchanan), who tricked her into believing Tad could not love the child due to the painful memories associated with her birth. Tad then rejects Dixie for her decision. Dejected, he turns back to Krystal. Tad begins the search for his lost daughter. Getting nowhere, he kidnaps Greg and buries him alive. He is planning to dig him up after he reveals the location of Kate. But Greg never broke. He dies when his coffin caves in. Tad is horrified at what he did for love.

Dixie and Zach Slater (Thorsten Kaye) go to trial for Greg's murder. On the witness stand, Tad tries to incriminate Dixie. In front of their sons, he berates their mother for abandoning them. Dixie is shocked to see Tad's true feelings come out. Her attorney is able to discredit his testimony, and the jury acquits them both. Tad reveals to Dixie it was his ploy to stop the investigation into Greg's murder because he had committed the crime. Dixie and Tad finally begin to make peace, and he forgives her for all she has done. The family reunites at Christmas, and Tad and Dixie finally have a wonderful holiday with their sons. Tad realizes how much he still loves his ex-wife, and Dixie clearly loves Tad. They begin to plan a future together once again, but a tragic turn of events occur. In January 2007, Dixie eats a plate of poisoned pancakes meant for her daughter-in-law Babe, and she begins to have pains in her heart. She immediately collapses of a massive heart attack. Despite prompt medical attention, she dies in the emergency room, with Tad at her side. Her last words were to Tad: together forever.

Tad grows close to Jim and Linda Mershon's adopted daughter, Kathy (Alexa Gerasimovich). Julia, who was named as Kathy's guardian, acts uncomfortable when Kathy asks Tad to be her new father after her parents are killed in a car accident. Kathy helps Tad cope with his loss. Krystal, who has married Adam, reveals the child she is pregnant with is Tad's, not Adam's. Adam reacts by kicking his wife out. Krystal and Tad's baby is named Jenny, for Tad's late sister. Days after Jenny's birth, Janet Green (Kate Collins) kidnaps her from the neonatal ward. It is revealed Adam influenced Janet to escape the mental ward and steal Jenny. Adam intended to sell Jenny on the black market. Luckily, Janet comes to her senses and returns Jenny to her parents. Adam refuses to relent in his influence over Krystal's life. Wanting to protect Jenny and Krystal from Adam, Tad asks Krystal to marry him again. They enter a marriage of convenience on December 26, 2007.

Various people from Tad's past come back to Pine Valley. Joe Martin asks Dr Angie Hubbard (Debbi Morgan) to consult with him on a case. Jesse and Angie's son, Frank Hubbard (Cornelius Smith Jr.), becomes ill after ingesting a toxin in the Pine Valley woods. The ordeal brings someone surprising out of hiding, Jesse Hubbard (Darnell Williams), who had never died. A crime lord, called The Papel, had threatened to hurt his family, thinking Jesse was in the possession of a rare uncut diamond. Krystal stages it so Angie and Jesse see each other again.

Seeing that Angie causes Jesse to let down his guard, Robert Gardner (David Rasche) comes to town. Robert was Ray's brother and is Tad's uncle. Tad wants nothing to do with Robert. However, he somehow charms Opal and Krystal. Robert is, in fact, The Papel. He shows his true colors at Jesse and Angie's wedding. He shoots and kills Julia; Tad also gets caught in the line of fire, falls into a coma, and is visited by Dixie's spirit. Dixie and Tad live their lives together as if her accident in Switzerland never happened. Tad wants to stay with Dixie in Heaven, but she implores him to wake up because someone in Pine Valley needs him. Adam reveals he knows Kathy is Kate. Kathy has a hard time adjusting to life with the Martins, especially with Krystal.

When another tornado blows through Pine Valley - which kills Babe - Tad is haunted by his past. David makes his way back to town the same night. David blames Babe's death on JR's family. Tad hears that Jamie and Jeff are reported missing in the Congo, and so he goes to investigate the situation himself. What he does not know is that the news is part of David's plot to break up the Martins. While Tad is away, David drugs and seduces Krystal.

After learning about Krystal's night with David, Tad throws her out and wins full custody of Jenny in January 2009. Krystal files for divorce from Tad. He then begins working for Ryan Lavery (Cameron Mathison), doing an undercover investigation of Dr Riley Sinclair (McKenzie Westmore). The following Monday, Tad and Krystal settle their divorce right before Tad's friend, Greenlee Smythe (Rebecca Budig) is supposedly killed in a tragic accident. That May, Tad gets shot again by Jesse, because Jesse thought Tad was the murderer who killed Stuart. Tad begins to regain his memories from the night of the shooting, seeing Annie Lavery (Melissa Claire Egan), Kendall Hart (Alicia Minshew) and Emma Lavery (Lucy Merriam) in his visions of the night of Stuart's death. His step-son JR (now Jacob Young) is diagnosed with cancer. Meanwhile, Tad takes in the young, troubled Damon Miller (Finn Wittrock). He learns that Damon is the son of Hillary Wilson, his ex-wife. Tad, Jesse and Angie come to the conclusion that Damon could be Tad's son, which Tad then tells Krystal and Opal. On March 17, 2010, Tad receives the DNA results confirming that Damon is his son. Tad wants to confront Hillary, but she is not in her hotel room and does not answer her phone. Paul Miller (Robert Curtis Brown) Damon's step-father, comes to take Damon home, but Tad refuses to allow it because of how Paul has treated Damon. Damon overhears his paternity at the park, while Liza is arguing with Colby. Tad catches up with Damon at the hospital the next day and tries to explain why he didn't tell him sooner, but Damon doesn't want to have anything to do with him.

In March 2011, Tad marries Cara Castillo (Lindsay Hartley) so that she would not be deported - unaware that Dixie is actually alive. That September, Tad and Dixie - who has returned from the dead again - get engaged, despite him still being married to Cara. In May 2013, Tad was revealed to be out on the field on a case. In September 2013, Jesse contacts Tad for help regarding Russian criminal Yuri Koslov, suggesting that Tad may be returning to Pine Valley in the immediate future.

== Reception ==
In 2024, Charlie Mason from Soaps She Knows placed Tad ninth on his ranked list of Soaps' 40 Most Iconic Characters of All Time, writing, "Michael E. Knight's tireless womanizer earned his "Tad the Cad" nickname the fun way. Well, not so much fun for all of the brokenhearted lovers he left in his wake. But fun for him, anyway".

== See also ==
- Tad Martin and Dixie Cooney
