= Julia Santos =

- All My Children character
- Portrayed by: Sydney Penny
- Duration: 1993–1997; 2002; 2005–2008
- First appearance: September 1993
- Last appearance: May 28, 2008
- Created by: Megan McTavish
In-universe information
- Occupation: Nurse
- Parents: Hector Santos; Isabella Santos
- Siblings: Maria Santos; Mateo Santos; Anita Santos; Rosa Santos
- Husband: Noah Keefer (1996–2005)
- Adoptive daughters: Kathy Martin (legal ward)
- Nieces and nephews: Sam Grey (adoptive); Maddie Grey; Max Santos; Lorenzo Santos

Julia Santos is a fictional character from the ABC daytime drama All My Children. She was portrayed by actress Sydney Penny from 1993 to 1996 as a series regular, with guest appearances in 1997 and 2002. She returned to the role in 2005 and left again in 2008, when the character was killed-off. The role was originally created for Penny after she was nominated for an Emmy Award for her work in another soap opera, Santa Barbara. Julia was introduced as the sister of established character Maria Santos (Eva LaRue) and was described as being sexually motivated and being slightly on edge. Julia's romantic pairing with Noah Keefer (Keith Hamilton Cobb) formed one of daytime's first interracial supercouples and was one of the most popular pairings of the 1990s, being well received by viewers and critics. Julia was paired with other men after Noah was killed-off, but these were unsuccessful.

The character's last appearance aired in the episode originally broadcast on May 28, 2008. Penny believed that her character would not return to the soap after her death despite other characters being resurrected from the dead in soap operas. For her role as Julia, Penny received a 1995 Daytime Emmy Award for Outstanding Supporting Actress in a Drama Series nomination. Penny's portrayal of Julia was received positively, but Luke Kerr from Daytime Confidential opined that Julia floated in and out of storylines during her final stint due to Noah having been killed-off.

== Casting and characterisation ==
Julia Santos was portrayed by Sydney Penny, who had previously portrayed B.J. Walker on another soap opera, Santa Barbara. The producers of All My Children created the role of Julia for Penny after she was nominated for an Emmy Award for her portrayal of B.J. in Santa Barbara. The actress commented that she would have been "foolish" to not take the role of Julia as the character was very different from B.J.

Julia is introduced as the sister of established character Maria Santos (Eva LaRue) and it was teased that Julia's arrival would trigger "interesting developments". In 1993, Penny described Julia as being slightly "on edge" and the "flip side of 'normal'", and she predicted that Julia's main problems would be to do with men. Penny later described Julia as being "incredibly sexually motivated" and not having boundaries. The actress commented that she had to come out of her "shell" when playing Julia as the character is "very physically free" whilst the actress considered herself as having been raised "very proper", and commented that she was trying to see life through Julia's eyes. Penny enjoyed working on soap operas as she was able to develop her character from the beginning and also work consistently without having periods of not having work. She described soap operas as being the best learning experience of her life. Penny's debut as Julia aired in September 1993.

== Development ==
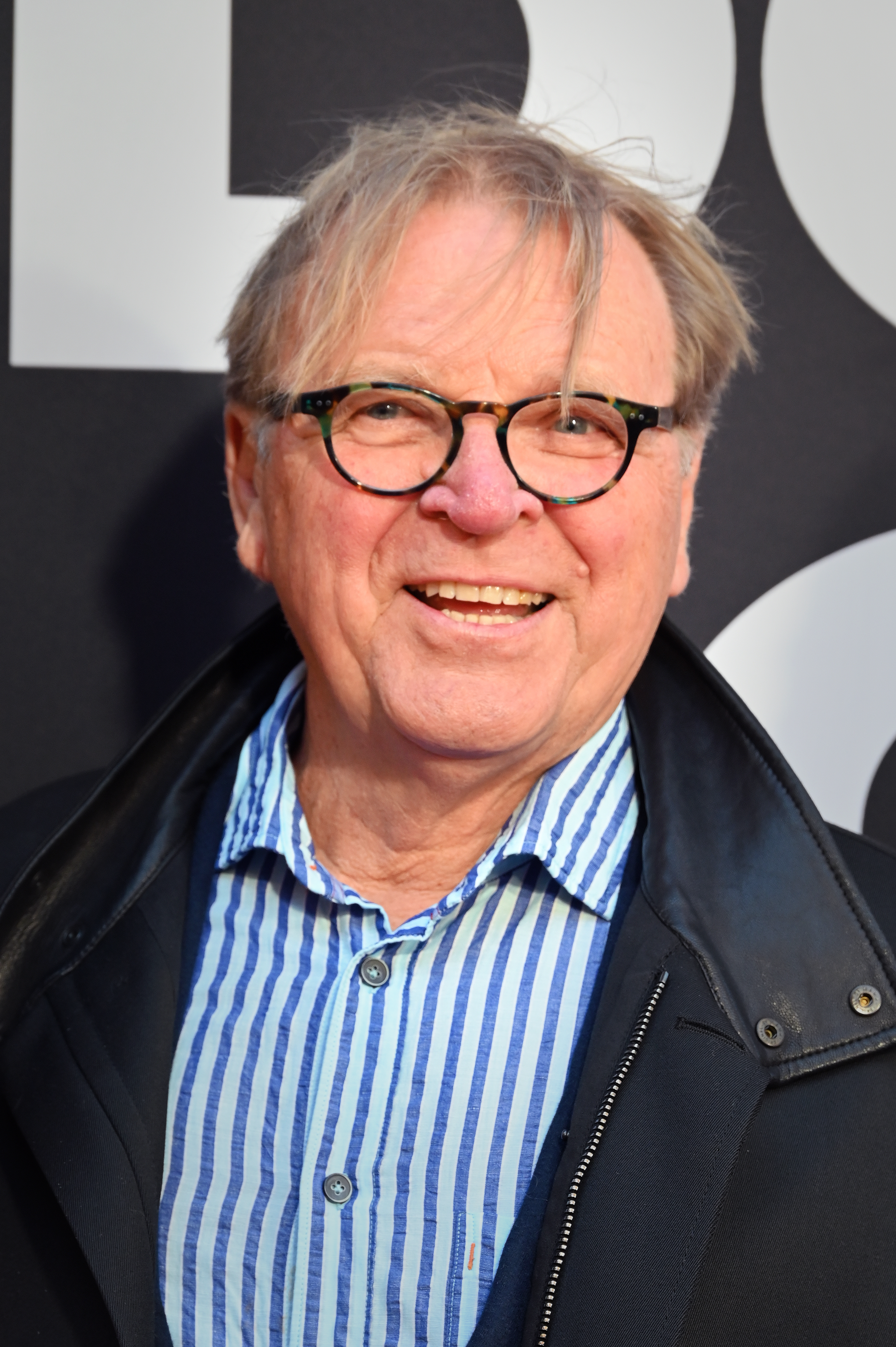
David Rasche portrayed Robert Gardner, a character who shoots Julia, which leads to her death

Julia develops a relationship with Noah Keefer (Keith Hamilton Cobb); the characters meet in 1994, after Julia runs away to Center City after having been scarred by a chandelier that fell on her during a tornado. Their wedding aired in the episode originally broadcast on June 7, 1996. The wedding was Cinderella-themed and Julia's gown was custom-made as a duplicate of what Cinderella wore in a movie. Speaking about filming the wedding scenes, Penny told Soap Opera Digest in 2005, "I loved getting to waltz. It was quite a challenge, actually, because [Cobb is] quite a bit taller than me and I had that massively huge skirt on, which kept me a good three feet away from him". During the wedding, Gloria goes to find a minister as Noah and Julia forgot to book one, and there are also "Touching words" from guests about the couple's relationship. Noah is later murdered by Garrett Williams (Lamman Rucker), known as "The Dragon", which prompts Julia to threaten Zach Slater (Thorsten Kaye) as she believes he knows who is responsible for her husband's death. After Noah's death, producers paired Julia with other characters, but according to Cobb, these never "took off" and viewers saw Julia and Noah as an "entity".

Penny originally departed All My Children as Julia in 1996, but returned for guest appearances in 1997 and 2002. Penny then returned to All My Children as a regular cast member in 2005. Prior to her return, the character had been in Witness Protection in San Francisco. According to Luke Kerr from Daytime Confidential, it became "apparent" to viewers that the soap was unsure what to do with Julia's character due to the absence of Noah, and that she "floated in and out of several storylines". Julia had a brief romance with Jamie Martin (Justin Bruening), but this abruptly ended when Bruening left the soap. Whilst working on the soap in 2007, Penny became pregnant in real life whilst Julia was depicted as wanting to have a child in the soap. In April 2008, it was rumoured that Penny would be departing the soap. In the episode originally airing on May 28, 2008, Julia was killed-off at the wedding of Jesse Hubbard and Angie Baxter (Darnell Williams and Debbi Morgan) after being shot by Robert Gardner (David Rasche), who was trying to shoot Aidan Devane (Aiden Turner). Penny believed that her character would not be resurrected from the dead despite it being a common occurrence in soap operas, saying, "They made such a big point about my being shot through virtually every organ. I think it's fine that Julia died".

== Storylines ==
Julia comes to Pine Valley from Texas to live with her sister, Maria Santos (Eva LaRue). Soon after her arrival, a tornado strikes the Pennsylvania town and Julia is struck by a falling chandelier that scars her face. She runs away to Center City and into the arms of Noah Keefer (Keith Hamilton Cobb), with whom she lives and eventually falls in love with. Julia becomes pregnant after being raped by drug dealer Louie Greco, and choose to have an abortion, despite considerable opposition from her devout Roman Catholic Mexican-American family. The relationship between a Hispanic Mestizo Julia and the African American Noah is also contentious in her family. When Noah learns of Louie's actions, he chases him down and accidentally kills him. Noah is found guilty of his murder and he escapes to Jamaica with Julia; Noah is eventually exonerated of the crime. Julia and Noah get married, but two thugs who are after Noah's aunt, Grace, try to end Julia's life. Julia then witnesses the attempted murder of Noah's sister Belinda and when she testifies against her sister-in-law's attacker, she is forced to enter the witness protection program with Noah. The two quickly leave Pine Valley in 1996 for somewhere in Northern California. In 1997, Maria is presumed killed in a plane crash and Julia is allowed to return for her funeral. Five years later, in 2002, Maria is found alive and Julia returns to see her sister and they share an emotional reunion.

Julia returned in 2005, following Noah's murder, and ends up avenging Noah's death by killing Garret Williams (Lamman Rucker) in self-defense. Julia becomes the legal guardian of a little girl named Kathy (Alexa Gerasimovich), whose parents were killed in a car accident, and embarks on an affair with Jamie Martin (Justin Bruening). This slowly turns into love, but the romance ends when Julia leaves town. She returned to Pine Valley to find that her Jamie has gone to Africa to work with Doctors Without Borders. Julia then begins a brief flirtation with Jackson Montgomery (Walt Willey), which infuriates Erica Kane (Susan Lucci).

Julia is offered the head-nurse job at a hospital in Australia and plans on leaving Pine Valley. However, before she is able to, at the wedding of Jesse Hubbard and Angie Baxter (Darnell Williams and Debbi Morgan), Robert Gardner (David Rasche) busts into the reception holding Angie at gunpoint. Gardner spots Aidan Devane (Aiden Turner) gunning for him and fires off a wild shot in Aidan's direction, accidentally shooting Julia. At the hospital, Joe Martin tells her that the wound lacerated her liver. Together with a steady internal bleed, Julia knows her chances of surviving are unlikely and so she decides against surgery. Knowing that Kathy had lost her mother in the same hospital, Julia does not let Krystal, who travelled with her in the ambulance, get Kathy so she can say goodbye. She asked Krystal to call Maria to come and take Kathy. After being thanked by Dixie Cooney (Cady McClain) for taking care of Kathy, at the hospital bed, in the presence of Joe and Krystal, Julia tearfully dies, speaking of her love for Kathy.

== Reception ==
For her role as Julia, Penny received a Daytime Emmy Award for Outstanding Supporting Actress in a Drama Series nomination in 1995. John N. Goudas from the Daily American called Julia a "juicy role" and believed that her arrival would cause an impact for a long time.

Julia and Noah's relationship became popular with viewers and was considered a "fan favourite". The pairing formed one of daytime's first interracial supercouples and was one of the most popular pairings of the 1990s. Michael Logan from TV Guide wrote that Penny was "so triumphant as the tragic heroine Julia". Cassie Foss from Star-News suggested that Penny may be "best known" for her role as Julia and highlighted the character's arc as being "disfigured by debris in a tornado and raped by a drug dealer before being shot at a wedding". In 2021, a writer from People put Julia and Noah's wedding on their list of the "10 Most Memorable Weddings" to occur on the soap, calling Noah and Julia the "Perpetual couple-on-the-run". Discussing Julia and Noah's romance, Lori Wilson from Soaps She Knows wrote, "While their love story ended tragically, Julia and Noah enjoyed some happy times together and were deeply in love". In 2015, Christine Orlando from TV Fanatic put Julia and Noah 13th on her list of "21 Super Sexy Soap Opera Couples".

== See also ==
- List of supercouples
