= Brian Wheatley =

Fictional character

- As the World Turns character
- Portrayed by: Laurence Lau
- Duration: 2008–09
- First appearance: August 18, 2008
- Last appearance: March 12, 2009
In-universe information
- Occupation: Businessman; Former Executive Director of the Luke Snyder Foundation
- Spouse: Carolyn Wheatley (backstory); Lucinda Walsh (2008–09)

Brian Wheatley is a fictional character on CBS's daytime drama As the World Turns. He was portrayed by veteran daytime actor Laurence Lau from August 18, 2008, to January 14, 2009, and again on March 12, 2009.

== Casting and characterization ==
Laurence Lau joined the cast as new character Brian Wheatley in order to aggravate the character Luke Snyder and his recent coming out storyline. Lau had previously portrayed the role of Greg Nelson on the ABC soap opera All My Children from 1981 to 1986 and again in 2008, alongside Kim Delaney. He also had roles on NBC's Another World as Dr. Jamie Frame from 1986 to 1990 and ABC's One Life to Live as Sam Rappaport from 2001 to 2003, taking over for actor Kale Browne. Lau has also appeared on stage productions such as Arrivals, Spine, The Exonerated, The Goat, Becky's New Car, Scituate, God of Carnage, and Psycho Therapy.

Lau's character was to show the evolution of a man who is forced to realize his true attraction towards people of the same sex. The show's executive producer Christopher Goutman used Brian as a device to show that while Brian may at first be seen as an implausible man, his actions were simply of a person struggling to accept who he was.

== Character history ==
=== 2008–2009 ===
Brian Wheatley arrived in Oakdale at the request of Lucinda Walsh to oversee her The Luke Snyder Foundation, a charity run by her grandson Luke Snyder. As Brian and Luke became friends, hostility arose as Brian suggested Luke distance himself from his homosexuality so that the charity is not identified solely on his lifestyle. The two men had their disagreements but made up as Brian and Lucinda began to have feelings with one another. Lucinda was soon shocked to learn that her breast cancer returned and so Brian decided to devote himself to her recovery. Following her diagnosis, Lucinda asked Brian to marry her. To prove to Lucinda's family that he was not after her money, Brian had a prenuptial agreement that would deny him any access to her estate. The couple marry at Lucinda's bedside and Brian assures that he truly loves her. However, when he crossed paths with a drunk Luke, he kissed him. Brian and Luke were at odds and Luke was convinced to keep his step-grandfather's secret. Following a second kiss after a bachelor party, a third kiss happened on New Year's Eve, which was initiated by a drunken Luke; Luke's boyfriend Noah Mayer mistakenly thought that Brian had initiated that kiss, and punched him. Brian told everyone that he was mugged but his secret came out after Luke's cousin Jade Taylor revealed the truth to Lucinda, destroying the marriage. After Luke confronted Brian's ex-wife Carolyn Wheatley about his struggle, Brian was finally relieved that his secret was out. Brian's admission may have ended his marriage to Lucinda, but they became good friends and he soon left town before returning briefly to support Luke's charity.

== Reception ==
The show's decision to introduce the character of Brian came with disapproval because it depicted a man who used a dying woman to get close to her gay grandson. Lucinda's portrayer Elizabeth Hubbard praised Lau's performances but criticized the storyline in an interview with TV Guide columnist Michael Logan saying, "How do you come out of a mastectomy and ask some guy you barely know to marry you? And then get married within the same episode! And on top of that he turns out to be gay! The whole point of that story was so that Brian Wheatley [Laurence Lau] could get close to Lucinda's grandson, Luke, and kiss the boy. As an actress, how do you maintain a course through that? Luckily, Larry Lau was a lovely, charming guy so I could make it work. If he had been a s--t, it would have been very difficult." Luke's portrayer Van Hansis also commented on the storyline in an interview with Michael Fairman saying, "I don’t think that’s where they are going. Of course, there are some uncomfortable aspects of this story, but it’s not going to be about this older lecherous man going after this younger guy. He is not a bad guy and that was not the intention for the character. I think his confusion might be perceived as this, because he is lying to himself and he is lying to other people. I don’t think he is being malicious at all."
