= Tad Martin and Dixie Cooney =

Tad and Dixie
- Michael E. Knight and Cady McClain as Tad and Dixie, with daughter Kathy (then-Alexa Gerasimovich)
- Duration: 1989–2007, 2011–
- Introduced by: Felicia Minei Behr
In-universe information
- Other names: TnD, T&D
- Family: Cortlandt, Martin
- Spouse: 1989–90, 1994–96, 1999–2002, 2013–
- Children: Kathy Martin

Thaddeus James "Tad" Martin and Dixie Louise Cooney Martin are fictional characters and a supercouple from the American daytime drama All My Children. Tad is portrayed by Michael E. Knight, and Dixie is portrayed by Cady McClain. On Internet message boards, the couple is often referred to as "T&D" or "TnD" (for Tad and Dixie).

The pairing became one of the most prominent soap opera couples on ABC Daytime. In early 2007, controversy abounded when former All My Children head writer Megan McTavish made the decision to kill off one half of the pair: Dixie. Viewers protested against the writers and the ABC television network, demanding that they find a way to undo Dixie's death. However, the character's demise was deemed permanent. To appease fans and make an effort to amend the situation, ABC Daytime executives and McClain confirmed in March 2008 that Dixie would be returning to the series, but in the form of a ghost and for a brief time period. McClain's first airdate was May 2, 2008. In April 2011, it was announced that she would be returning to the serial before its September 23, 2011, network ending. Dixie is seen returning in the May 17, 2011, episode, where she is shown to be alive and held captive in an undisclosed location by David Hayward, later managing to escape.

== Storylines ==
Soon after her arrival in Pine Valley, Dixie falls under the influence of Adam Chandler, the archenemy of her Uncle Palmer. Although Adam and Brooke English are happily married at the time, Adam realizes that Brooke cannot give him the one thing that he wants most in the world — a son. Adam has a brief affair with Dixie, and she becomes pregnant. He suggests to Brooke that they adopt Dixie's baby and she agrees, but she has one small problem — she wonders who the father is. Brooke hires Tad Martin to find out who fathered Dixie's baby, and Tad and Dixie become friends. They talk, laugh, eat chicken fingers and become very close. However, their bond is shattered when Dixie realizes that Tad is only interested in her to find out information for Brooke. She decides to try to make it work with Adam, but deep down she knows that Tad has found his way into her heart.

Heaven help me, I've just forgotten every woman I've ever met.

— Tad to Dixie, when they first meet at Myrtle's dress shop

Dixie marries Adam, not knowing that he is only interested in gaining full custody of their child. Tad persists in warning Dixie about Adam's true intentions, but she simply will not listen. "I'm his wife, Tad, of course he loves me!" is what Dixie often replies whenever Tad suggests that Adam is only after the baby. Despite Dixie's stubbornness and refusal to face the truth, Tad persists in warning his beloved, and his insistence gets him beaten up by Adam's thugs. Dixie nurses her best friend back to health, and the two once again feel the closeness they shared at the beginning of their friendship. On the day Adam Jr. (later known as JR) is born, Tad reveals to Dixie that he wants more than friendship from her. He has fallen in love with the girl from Pigeon Hollow and finally admits his true feelings. Although it is obvious (to the audience) that Dixie loves Tad as well, she decides to stay with Adam and tells Tad that they cannot be friends or see each other anymore.

Staying away from each other proves to be very painful and difficult for Tad and Dixie, especially considering that Pine Valley is a small town. Try as she may, Dixie is unable to stay away from Tad and when JR is kidnapped, Dixie immediately calls Tad. While everyone thinks that Skye Chandler is the kidnapper, Tad manages to prove that the baby snatcher was really a woman named Karen.

Determined to get sole custody of JR, Adam comes up with a very elaborate and sadistic plot to make Dixie think that she is losing her mind. In time, Adam's plan works and he sends Dixie to a sanitarium. Adam looks forward to raising his son and winning back Brooke, but has not counted on the fact that Tad will stop at nothing to get Dixie out of the mental institution. With characters Cecily and Nico's help, Tad manages to free his beloved from the clutches of Adam and his accomplice, Dr. Snow. While on the run from Adam, Dixie finally admits her true feelings to Tad; she does not love Adam, it is him she loves.

Even though they manage to prove that Dixie is sane, she still loses custody of JR, and Adam offers her generous visiting privileges if she agrees to a quick divorce, which she does. Finally freed from Adam, Dixie falls into Tad's arms and he proposes to her wearing a bright yellow chicken suit. Dixie happily accepts, and the two make plans to wed. Their happiness is further cemented when Dixie regains custody of her son, and Palmer gets the best of Adam in a business deal. Tad and Dixie finally marry in late December 1989.

The couple divorces, however, just months later in May 1990 after Tad's mother, Opal, and Palmer interfere. They soon grow close again, but their plans to remarry are spoiled after Tad is presumed dead following an explosion. Nearly three years later, in late 1992, it is revealed that Tad had survived the explosion and has been living in California under a different name. He and Dixie reconcile, and in 1994, they remarry. With Tad's help, she finally regains custody of Adam Jr.

Their second marriage, lasts about 2 years until JR (then 8 years old) catches Tad having an affair with Liza Colby. Dixie divorces Tad, takes JR and moves to Pigeon Hollow, West Virginia. But she returns to Pine Valley in 1998 when Adam Chandler demands to see his son. She and Tad began dating again, and in 1999, they marry a third time.

By late 2001, their marriage has collapsed when Dixie has an affair with David Hayward after Tad (while high after unknowingly being drugged by Hayward) had a one time affair with Lesley Colson. In January 2002, Dixie leaves Tad and JR, off to the Caribbean, where she gets a divorce from Tad. Dixie regrets this decision, however, and returns to Pine Valley to try and reconcile with Tad. She and Tad make up, but Dixie learns that she is pregnant with a baby girl and flees to Switzerland to give birth to the child in secret. When Dixie is in her third trimester, she writes Tad a letter, telling him that she is pregnant and wants to come back to him. However, on May 10, 2002, while driving back from Geneva to Bern, she is in involved in a horrible car crash and is presumed dead. Tad and JR mourn, but eventually move on with their lives.

When I looked at Dixie, all I ever saw was home. And when I held her, I knew I was where I was supposed to be.

— Tad, at Dixie's first memorial

Dixie is still mentioned, and there is a time where a woman named Di Kirby claims to be the "back from the dead" Dixie. It is later revealed that she is rather Dixie's half-sister.

On December 23, 2005, it is shown (to the audience) that Dixie did indeed survive the automobile accident that was thought to have claimed her life while she was in Europe. Di, the only one who knows that Dixie is alive, goes to visit her, and urges her to return to Pine Valley and let her family know that she is alive. Dixie seems adamant on not taking Di's advice at first, but soon returns to Pine Valley in February 2006. She attends the Mardi Gras ball thrown by Erica Kane. Because her face is hidden by a mask, no one from her family recognizes her. She does, however, witness a tender moment between Tad and Di, as well as JR and Babe. Janet Dillon rigs the hot water heater at the mansion where the ball is being held so that it will explode. When it does, many people die and are injured and Dixie is trapped by some rubble. She manages to escape without being discovered by anyone. She goes to Wildwind, where Di is staying. In the middle of confronting her sister, Tad arrives and Dixie runs off before he can see her. Later, she runs into Zach Slater, and he promises not to reveal the fact that she is still alive. Later, she secretly watches in horror as her son holds a gun to Krystal Carey at a cabin, demanding to know where his ex-wife, Babe, has taken their son. Dixie hides as Tad arrives and tries to wrestle the gun away from JR, but the gun goes off and hits Dixie (who is outside) in the arm. It is soon revealed that Tad and Dixie's baby, Kate, is in fact alive, but was taken by Dr. Greg Madden, a famous surgeon who is hated by virtually everyone in Pine Valley. A few months earlier, Tad had informed Erica that Greg stole her baby, the one she aborted twenty-something years ago, and Erica's son is also alive, going by the name Josh Madden.

On April 14, 2006, Tad and Dixie finally come face to face since her presumed death. Tad looks at Dixie with an astonished expression and leaves with her, resulting in him punching Dr. David Hayward, who was and is determined to keep Tad from Dixie. Tad first thinks that David's obsession with Dixie has led him to have plastic surgery performed on someone, but once Dixie says the words "Ozzie and Harriet", he knows that this woman is his true love.

Tad is furious, however, that Dixie let him and JR think that she was dead for four years without a word. He grows even angrier when he learns that she gave away Kate after letting Greg Madden convince her that Tad could not love a daughter, who, Madden claimed, would remind him of Dixie's death too much for him to love the child properly. Tad vents his anger while testifying at Dixie's trial when she stands accused of Greg Madden's murder. Afterwards, though, the two begin to reconcile. Tad invites her for a date one morning, and Dixie accepts. However, in 2007, she dies that day after eating poisoned pancakes that were meant for her daughter-in-law (Babe). Babe's attempted murderer is known as the Satin Slayer, a serial killer killing off the women of Fusion Cosmetics. Dixie's ghost/spirit later sees Tad playing with a little 4-year-old named Kathy and instinctively knows that the little girl is actually their lost daughter — Kate. At first, no one else in Pine Valley knows this but Dixie. Adam, however, later discovers the child alive and keeps the knowledge to himself. He is conflicted on a number of occasions on whether to tell Tad, but ultimately decides against it when he finds out that Tad has married the woman he loves, Krystal Carey.

In May 2008, Dixie's spirit returns to Pine Valley. On a mission to reunite Tad with his daughter, she haunts Adam, telling him that she will only stop if he tells Tad where Kate is. Adam constantly refuses, but finally relents once Tad is shot by a deranged Rob Gardner at Jesse Hubbard and Angie Baxter's wedding, where celebration has just ended. As Tad experiences the life he could have had with Dixie while lying in Pine Valley hospital hanging between life and death, Adam calls out to him. At Tad's bedside, he tries to reach Tad through the unconscious. Dixie hears Adam calling Tad and smiles, still in Tad's embrace. Tad and Dixie say once last goodbye, after one last kiss, and part hands. Tad goes back to the land of the living to be a father to Kate.

On May 17, 2011, despite her ghostly appearances, Dixie is revealed to be alive and being held under observation in a locked cell by David. It later turns out she is one of the patients in David's medical experiment called Project Orpheus. Dixie manages to escape, still disoriented and weak from the drugs David has given her. She comes to Pine Valley, where her daughter Kathy and son JR see her, but think that they're hallucinating. Eventually, officer Brot Monroe finds her and takes her to Oak Haven.

At Oak Haven, she runs into Erica, who has recently been admitted. Erica helps Dixie get out, along with Annie Lavery, Marian Colby, and Janet Dillon. Marian, Erica, and Dixie make their way to Erica's daughter, Kendall's house. When Kendall brings up David's name, Dixie runs away in fright. She still hasn't gained back her senses yet.

Dixie makes her way to the park and finds Tad, who is talking to her through the stars. On August 8, 2011, Tad asks for a sign from Dixie, and she calls out his name. At first, Tad thinks he's imagining it. Then, Dixie calls out again. Tad turns around and sees Dixie, and they finally reunite. As they spend time under the stars that night, Dixie slowly regains her senses and strength again in Tad's presence.

Tad takes Dixie home the next morning, where she meets their daughter, Kathy, face-to-face for the first time.

== Reception and impact ==
=== General ===
Tad and Dixie's romance has been featured, alluded to and studied in several books, and is considered a timeless, classic romance. Reasons for the couple's success were analyzed by soap opera magazine Soap Opera Digest: "The thing that made Tad and Dixie so magical was their sparkling humor, and Michael E. Knight's and Cady McClain's ability to express it brilliantly." Entertainment Weekly stated, "Soulmates Tad (Michael E. Knight) and Dixie (Cady McClain) set the soap world on fire with their straightforward, often hilarious interactions as they fought ex-husbands, ex-wives, and countless others to be with each other."

=== Scholarly and further analysis ===
In 2004, writers Robert Parkin and Linda Stone published the book Kinship and Family: An Anthropological Reader, a representative collection tracing the history of the anthropological study of kinship from the early 1900s to the present day. In their study, one of the topics Parkin and Stone analyzed was how in today's soap opera medium, a family consisting of a husband and wife living with their biological children is now "exceedingly rare" and it is not something that is expected anymore on daytime dramas to create the "ideal" family. In their chapter Kinship In The American Soap Opera, Parkin and Stone presented the Tad and Dixie marriage as the prime example. Studied was how JR (biological son of Adam and Dixie) and Jamie (Tad's biological son with ex-wife Brooke English) lived with Tad and Dixie. Tad shared custody with Brooke, which pleased everyone. He was and an ideal stepfather to JR, despite the fact that JR's other father, Adam, is Tad's archenemy. Likewise, Dixie was an ideal stepmother to Jamie. Parkin and Stone reasoned that "in this family, there are biological connections with children, but these are not shared between husband and wife. On today's soaps, this is as good as it gets. Tad and Dixie are happy to have created a family and they do not long to create biogenetic children together".

Steven Pinker, often called the world's leading expert on language and the mind lucidly, is another writer to document Tad and Dixie's romance for one of his examples analyzing the power of words. His book, The Language Instinct, which is said to explain everything a person wanted to know about languages (how it works, how children learn it, how it changes, how the brain computes it, and how it evolved) received the William James Book Award from the American Psychological Association and the Public Interest Award from the Linguistic Society of America. Pinker wrote: "Simply by making noises with our mouths, we can reliably cause precise new combinations of ideas to arise in each other's minds. The ability comes so naturally that we are apt to forget what a miracle it is."

As a demonstration, Pinker asks the reader to surrender only his or her imagination to his words for a few moments. He says that he can cause the reader to think some "very specific thoughts". Pinker gives a few immediate examples; he notes how the "normally grayish body" of a male octopus suddenly becomes striped when selecting a female to mate with, cherries jubilee on a white suit, wine on an altar cloth, and how immediately applying club soda to the white suit or altar cloth works well to remove the stains from the fabrics. In his next mention, Pinker notes a Tad and Dixie scene: "When Dixie opens the door to Tad, she is stunned, because she thought he was dead," says Pinker. "She slams it in his face and then tries to escape. However, when Tad says, 'I love you,' she lets him in. Tad comforts her, and they become passionate, When Brian interrupts, Dixie tells a stunned Tad that she and Brian were married earlier that day. With much difficulty, Dixie informs Brian that things are nowhere near finished between her and Tad. Then she spills the news that Jamie is Tad's son. 'My what?' says a shocked Tad."

Pinker asks the reader to think about the words of his Tad and Dixie example and how they resonate. "I did not simply remind you of octopuses; in the unlikely event that you ever see one develop stripes, you now know what will happen next," he said. "Perhaps the next time you are in a supermarket you will look for club soda, one out of the tens of thousands of items available, and then not touch it until months later when a particular substance and a particular object accidentally come together. You now share with millions of other people the secrets of protagonists in a world that is the product of some stranger's imagination, the daytime drama All My Children."

Dr. Nancy Kalish's Lost Love Project, titled Lost And Found Lovers: Facts And Fantasies of Rekindled Romances, is an experiment which documented people who seek out lost love and how often they achieve "happy endings". Kalish studied the accounts of 1,001 people who participated in the project. Her focus was not only on real-life couples but on fictional couples as well. She cited that Lost Love is also central to soap operas and film. The romance of Tad and Dixie is one that she took note of.

In addition, Tad and Dixie's romance has been referred to by fictional characters within books of fiction. In the book Along Came Mary: A Bad Girl Creek Novel (by writer Jo-Ann Mapson of the original bestseller Bad Girl Creek), character Mary Madigan details the extent of the impact that the Tad and Dixie love story has had on the people in her life: "One thing I knew for sure, unless Mama had gotten a job, she was home, because it was time for All My Children. Both MayAnn and Mama had a king-size investment in Tad and Dixie's marriage, the one union on earth they considered unbreakable. It was the source of most of their bickering."

Another analysis regarding Tad and Dixie's romance includes the aftermath of Dixie's first "death". Her sister, Di, pretends to be her during one of the show's storylines. Parts of the couple's romance were parodied in the book Teleparody: Predicting/Preventing the TV Discourse of Tomorrow. In addition, All My Children - Daytime's Greatest Weddings have documented Tad and Dixie as one of the greatest romances ever told.

=== Controversy ===
In early 2007, All My Children made the controversial decision to kill off Dixie. Dixie had been seemingly killed off before, but this time her death was stated to be permanent. The decision was considered "one of the biggest upsets" in daytime history. Former All My Children head writer Megan McTavish created the tale, tentatively titled the Satin Slayer storyline, which centered around a vicious serial killer murdering the women of a cosmetics company called Fusion. In what was poisoned food (peanut butter and banana pancakes) meant for Dixie's daughter-in-law, Babe Carey, Dixie ate instead. The poison almost immediately took effect and (after being rushed to the hospital) eventually killed the character within an hour.

ABC executive producer Julie Hanan Carruthers later explained in an interview what the writers were going for with the storyline. Carruthers said, "When Megan [McTavish, head writer] came up with this whole concept, it was about, 'How do we emotionally impact [upon] all the people we care about?' And obviously high stakes, and life-or-death stakes, really raise the bar of emotion. When you can tap into the personal relationships and the love and the caring and also the hopes and fears of all these people we've invested so much time and support in, you have compelling storytelling."

The writers felt that by killing Dixie, it was unexpected and went beyond "just being about the women of Fusion". Killing Dixie was to send a message that anyone could be the next to die. "In order for a story like this to have real impact, it's not just about the reaction of our environment to the people who are lost," Carruthers said. "You have to understand that it can affect anybody, you know? It's not just the girls in Fusion who you only see once a week. It's people who are pivotal to the environment, as well. I'm trying to say this in a way that doesn't undercut what the Fusion girls have meant to the canvas, particularly those three characters who've been attacked [ Simone, Erin and Danielle], but a character with as much history as Dixie.... It shows that nothing is sacred and nothing is safe. By jumping off that diving board, not knowing what's at the bottom of the pool, you've now taken the story to a whole new level."

Viewers feeling that Dixie was "too safe" to kill is what "ironically" led to the writers to issue her demise. "In order to keep the audience, who is as savvy as they are — which we love, by the way — on the edge of their seat," said Carruthers, "they have to be able not to anticipate what the outcome is going to be. And to me, part of what we do is the element of surprise. Surprise that's validated by the play-out of the story, obviously; it's not just surprise for surprise's sake."

The audience disagreed with Carruthers. They expressed that the show made a "ludicrous decision" to keep Babe over Dixie. On February 18, 2007, it was reported that Cady McClain, Dixie's portrayer, had spoken out about what happened via her blog — to set the record straight and to ease the nerves of fans. Viewers had often voiced that Dixie was killed off because McClain was very out-spoken about matters she disagreed with in regards to the soap opera and executives. In December 2006, McClain learned that Dixie would be one of the Satin Slayer's victims. It was not until several weeks later, however, that the news of McClain's exit leaked to the media. Viewers speculated that her dismissal was due to her outspokenness about the exit of Emmy-winning actress Julia Barr (ex-Brooke English). Seemingly adding credibility to the rumor was a report from Fox News Channel stating that McClain's outspokenness led to ABC executives firing McClain. McClain responded on her blog: "Who is this guy from Fox news and what does he know?" She stated that her blog entries were always approved by ABC executives before they were posted to the Internet. "I was talking about the character of Brooke when I said 'life is not fair,' [..] not Julia getting let go."

Giving insight into what actually happened behind the scenes, McClain stated that "the show's triumvirate of top executives decided that killing Dixie was the best way to move forward for a character that no one quite knew what to do with [anymore]". She said, "This [was] a mutual decision of Brian [Frons, president of Daytime for Disney-ABC Television Group], Julie [Hanan Carruthers, AMC's executive producer] and Megan [McTavish, AMC's head writer]." McClain noted, "I was told they all agreed on this decision."

Further frustrating fans, it seemed as though ABC had seemingly removed all references to McClain and Dixie from their official All My Children website earlier that month, which further outraged fans. To this, McClain responded, "I really am only the actor. I don't think they will ever bring me back, especially if they have removed the Dixie CHARACTER bio from the website," McClain relayed. "It's over. It's all done. AMC is going to become something totally different than it once was. It will be all new, all different. Why? I can only conjecture." Thinking of her fellow actors, she later urged viewers not to give up on the show: "Do not stop watching All My Children," McClain stated. "There are some good actors on that show, the producers are trying new and innovative things, and the writers are trying out lots of concepts and ideas that you may ultimately find very entertaining."

Fans of the Tad and Dixie romance, in particular, respected McClain's words, but still sought ways to get Dixie back on canvas before the episode of Dixie's death even aired. Viewers sent "thousands of angry letters" threatening to stop watching the show to get ABC executives to take notice of their request. Their request, however, was not granted.

In March 2008, it was confirmed by ABC Daytime executives and McClain that Dixie would return to Pine Valley in the form of a ghost to lead Tad to Kate. McClain's first airdate was May 2, 2008. At that time, her last airdate as the character was on June 12, 2008. McClain additionally returned as Dixie's spirit in 2010 when her son, JR, is battling cancer. She greets "Uncle Palmer" Cortlandt into the great beyond upon the actor's (James Mitchell) passing. On April 29, 2011, it was confirmed [on McClain's Facebook page] that she would again reprise her role of Dixie Cooney Martin one final time. On May 17, 2011, Dixie was revealed to be alive, it was later revealed she was revived by David Hayward's Project Orpheus, and kept in the basements of Oak Haven.

== See also ==
- List of supercouples
