= Laurence Lau =

American television and stage actor (born 1954)

- Born: Laurence Henry Lau; May 10, 1954 (age 72); Long Beach, California, U.S.
- Other names: Laurence Lau Jr. Lawrence Law
- Occupation: Actor
- Spouse(s): Linda McCullough (1982–1984); Karen Wallace (1975–1978)
- Website: www.laurencelau.com

Laurence Henry Lau (born May 10, 1954) is an American television and stage actor, best known for his roles in several soap operas. He has also been credited in film.

== Early life and education ==
Lau was born in Long Beach, California, and raised in Lake Oswego, Oregon. He attended Columbia University and Brigham Young University.

== Career ==
One of his first roles was on the TV comedy/drama Eight Is Enough in 1980. He first became popular by playing the role of Greg Nelson on All My Children (1981–1986), in which his character got involved with a girl from the other side of the tracks, Jenny Gardner (Kim Delaney). Other notable soap roles include NBC's Another World as Jamie Frame (1986–1990), and ABC's One Life to Live as attorney Sam Rappaport (2001—2003), taking over from actor Kale Browne.

In 2007, Lau played Greeber in Scituate, a play written by Martin Casella and directed by David Hilder, at TBG Arts Mainstage in New York City. Soap opera critic for Atlantic Canada's Breakfast Television Matthew Borden claimed that this role would solidify Laurence as a big time soap opera actor. On May 20, 2008, Lau returned to All My Children as Greg Nelson to catch up with old pals Jesse and Angie Hubbard and brother-in-law Tad Martin.

On August 17, 2008, Lau joined the cast of As the World Turns in the recurring role of Brian Wheatley. Following the end of his stint on ATWT, Lau booked the pilot Upstate, which filmed on location in Syracuse, New York. However, the pilot was not picked up by a network in time for the next television season.

Lau also made appearances on primetime television shows including ABC's The Love Boat, CBS' The Waltons, NBC's Frasier, and CBS' JAG and Diagnosis: Murder.

Lau has appeared in stage productions such as Arrivals, Spine, The Exonerated, The Goat, Becky's New Car, Scituate, God of Carnage, and Psycho Therapy. He played Steve Heidebrecht in the national tour of August: Osage County, which starred Estelle Parsons, and has had numerous roles Off-Broadway and at regional theaters throughout the U.S.

== Filmography ==
=== Film ===
Year	Title	Role	Notes
2000	Return to the Secret Garden	Tom Carter	
2001	The Penny Promise	George Hampton	
2002	Jumping for Joy	Will White	
2004	Family Solitaire	Billy	
2023	The Ballad of a Hustler	Mr. Duke	

=== Television ===
Year	Title	Role	Notes
1980	Paris	Kevin Fritz	Episode: "Fitz's Boys"
1980	Eight Is Enough	Larry	Episode: "Generations"
1980	The Waltons	Young G.I.	Episode: "The Pledge"
1981	Happy Days	Phil	Episode: "Bride and Gloom"
1981	The Best Little Girl in the World	Mark	Television film
1981	ABC Afterschool Special	Wally	Episode: "Tough Girl"
1981–2009	All My Children	Greg Nelson	39 episodes
1982	Fantasies	Delivery Boy	Television film
1982	The Love Boat	Webb Jones	Episode: "The Man in the Iron Shorts"
1986–1989	Another World	Jamie Frame	48 episodes
1998	Frasier	Steven	Episode: "Where Every Bloke Knows Your Name"
1998	Mike Hammer, Private Eye	Deputy	Episode: "A New Leaf: Part 2"
1998	Diagnosis: Murder	Greg Hutchens	Episode: "Dead in the Water"
1999	Brimstone	Brad Armstrong	Episode: "Lovers"
2000	Martial Law	Warren Hargrove	Episode: "Scorpio Rising"
2000	JAG	Dr. Lawrence Gettis	3 episodes
2001-2003	One Life to Live	Sam Rappaport	Episodes from May 8, 2001-April 9, 2003
2004	Law & Order	Pancho Diamond	Episode: "The Dead Wives Club"
2005	Franklin Charter	Larry Drake	Television film
2008–2009	As the World Turns	Brian Wheatley	29 episodes
2011	Too Big to Fail	Greg Fleming	Television film
2012	Ghoul	Reverend Moore	Television film
2013	Elementary	Robert Baumann	Episode: "A Landmark Story"
2015	The Bar Mitzvah Club	Cecil's Dad	Television film
2018	Blue Bloods	Wayne Green	Episode: "Legacy"
2021	The Good Fight	Lawyer	Episode: "And the Clerk Had a Firm..."
2021	Harlem	Kurt Curtis	Episode: "Winter Solstice"
