= Paul Martin (All My Children) =

- All My Children character
- Portrayed by: Ken Rabat (1970–1972); William Mooney (1972–1995)
- Duration: 1970–1982; 1984–1985; 1990; 1995
- First appearance: January 5, 1970
- Last appearance: January 5, 1995
- Created by: Agnes Nixon
- Introduced by: Agnes Nixon and Bud Kloss
- Crossover appearances: One Life to Live
In-universe information
- Occupation: Lawyer
- Family: Martin
- Parents: Henry Martin; Kate Martin
- Brothers: Joe Martin
- Spouse: Anne Tyler (1972–1974, 1976–1981); Margo Flax (1974–1976)
- Daughters: Beth Martin
- Nephews: Jeff Martin; Bobby Martin; Tad Martin (adoptive); Jake Martin; Josh Madden (great); Charlie Brent (great); Jamie Martin (great; adoptive); Damon Miller (great; adoptive); Trevor Martin (great); Sam Grey (great-great)
- Nieces: Tara Martin; Kelsey Jefferson (great); Kathy Martin (great; adoptive); Jenny Martin (great; adoptive)

Paul Martin is a fictional character on ABC Daytime's All My Children.

== Portrayers ==
The character was created by Agnes Nixon, and portrayed by: Ken Rabat (1970–72); William Mooney (1972–82, 1984, 1985, 1990, 1995)

== Relationships ==
- Family: Katherine Martin (mother), Pauline Martin (aunt), Wayne Martin (uncle), Joe Martin (brother); Beth Martin (daughter)
- Marriages: Anne Tyler; Margo Flax; Anne Tyler

== Character History ==
1970: Attorney Paul Martin voluntarily entered the draft to defend his country in Vietnam. No sooner did he arrive was he presumed missing in action. It took a year for him to be discovered. Returning home to Pine Valley, he was reunited with his mother, Kate Martin, and brother, Dr. Joe Martin. Setting down roots, Paul opened his own law firm.

1971: Phoebe Tyler approached Paul with a proposition to date her daughter, Anne Tyler. Paul was intrigued by Anne and was more than willing to comply. He knew he had competition, as Anne was still seeing Nick Davis.

1972: Paul's love for Anne was left unrequited when she decided to marry Nick Davis. He was convinced they would remain friends, but he always wanted more. Anne turned to Paul when Nick made it clear he wanted a divorce. Paul became her lawyer, but their time together was leading to something more. Anne learned she was pregnant with Nick's child. Nick had wanted nothing to do with Anne, very well their child. Paul proposed that he would raise the child as his own. Anne accepted his proposal, and made plans to become the newest Mrs. Martin.

1973: Paul and Anne's marriage was actually working out. Paul could tell that as time went by, Anne was actually falling in love with him. Their happiness was short lived when Anne miscarried. She told Nick the truth about his child and their marriage. Though Nick and Anne were spending more time together again, Paul was not worried. Nick was now married to Kitty Shea, and they were expecting their own child. Anne abruptly left Pine Valley for New York. Paul was called by the hospital: Anne was in an accident. Paul and Phoebe arrived and saw Nick keeping vigil over Anne's comatose body. Paul demanded to know what had happened. Anne had gone to New York to make her final decision about Nick. That was all Paul needed to hear. Paul thought Anne had chosen Nick. He kicked Nick out of the hospital and waited for Anne. As long as he was her husband, he was going to keep his promise and stay by her bedside. When Anne awoke, Paul was despondent. He told her they were getting a divorce. Anne walked out of the hospital alone, and made her way out of Pine Valley.

1974: Paul swamped himself in his work so as to avoid thinking about Anne. His nephew Jeff Martin was his priority now. He was up for the murder of Jason Maxwell, his wife's lover. While looking through his affairs, the name Margo Flax constantly came up. She was Jason's former lover. Margo helped Paul to get to the bottom of his affairs. Their long hours together sparked a romance. Anne returned to Pine Valley after recovering in Seattle. She wanted to explain herself to Paul, but he was still unwilling to listen. Margo romanced his broken heart. Before he knew it, they were set to be married.

1975: Paul's marriage to Margo was crumbling. He turned to Anne for guidance. He realized that he could not just be Anne's friend. They began an affair. After a torrid weekend of love making, Paul decided he was going to break up with Margo. When he arrived home, Margo had shocking news. She was pregnant with Paul's son. Paul was now trapped in his marriage. He broke the news to Anne who agreed he needed to be there for his child.

1976: Paul found out that Margo had planned to adopt a child and pass it off as her own child. Paul rejected Margo. He turned to Anne once again. One night, Margo tried to poison Anne at The Boutique by causing a carbon monoxide leak. Paul saved her. Nick revealed that she was pregnant with child, Paul's child.

Paul and Anne decided to marry again. On their honeymoon, Anne fell ill with toxoplasmosis. Dr. Chris Karras revealed that Anne's child would be born severely mentally handicapped. Chris encouraged a therapeutic abortion. Anne refused. She was not going to lose another child. The Martin's greatest fear was realized when Beth Martin was born. Paul wanted Beth to be institutionalized, but Anne would have none of it. She fired all of the nanny's, and barricaded herself at home to care for Beth.

1977: Paul struggled to keep Anne sane. She refused to let Beth out of her sight for a minute. Paul finally got Anne to attend a meeting for parents with disabled children. But as soon as the meeting was over, she stormed her way home to be with Beth. Beth had died of SIDS. The trauma of the situation proved to be too much for Anne. She had a break from reality, cradling a photo Beth as if she was still alive. Phoebe and Paul were forced to institutionalize Anne.

1978: Without Anne, Paul threw himself into his work. His main priority was to see Ray Gardner thrown into prison for raping Ruth. After succeeding at that, he petitioned for Tad to be formally adopted by Ruth and Joe. With his father in prison, Tad's adoption was approved and finalized.

Paul found a supportive shoulder in Ellen Shepard, a childhood friend and the new owner of Anne's old business The Boutique. Ellen confided in Paul her apprehensions about her relationship with Mark Dalton, a man ten years her junior. Paul was Ellen's age, and they had a lot in common. As time went by, they began to see more of each other.

1979: Paul and Ellen's relationship continued to blossom. Paul decided to begin divorce proceedings from Anne. But, Phoebe got wind and confronted him. She blamed Ellen for Paul's change of heart, but it had nothing to do with her. Paul believed all hope was lost for Anne's recovery. The doctors at Oak Haven contacted Paul with good news. Anne was showing signs of recovery. Paul held off his divorce proceedings for the time being.

1980: Anne finally made clear signs of recovery. Her doctors allowed her to move back home, but she insisted in moving in with Phoebe first. Paul wanted to save his marriage and tried his best to rekindle their love.

1981–82: Anne agreed to move back in with Paul. He began his run for state office. But his competitors were cut throat. One day, Anne's car was blocked in and she decided to use Paul's car to go see her mother. When she started the ignition, the car exploded with her inside. The bomb was meant for Paul.

Filled with grief and guilt, Paul tried to come to terms with Anne's death. He decided Pine Valley had nothing left to offer him and left to build his life anew.

1985: Kate died peacefully in her sleep. All of the Martins returned to say farewell to their beloved grandmother.

1995: Paul returned to Pine Valley for the Martin family housewarming party. While looking back at his life in Pine Valley, Paul could not forget to remember the love he shared with Anne.
