= Greg Nelson and Jenny Gardner =

Fictional characters in the American soap opera All My Children

Greg and Jenny (Laurence Lau and Kim Delaney)

Greg Nelson and Jenny Gardner are fictional characters and a supercouple from the American soap opera All My Children. Greg was portrayed by Laurence Lau, and Jenny was portrayed by actress Kim Delaney.

They were best friends to fellow supercouple Jesse Hubbard and Angie Baxter.

== Background ==
=== Writing ===
When the writers of All My Children had characters Greg and Jenny meet in 1981, after having Jenny move to the fictional town of Pine Valley with her mother, Opal Gardner (then portrayed by Dorothy Lyman), they applied four obstacles to the couple's love story:

1. Age (Jenny is younger than Greg. In 1981, Greg is a senior in high school while Jenny is only fifteen)
2. Economic backgrounds (they come from different economic backgrounds; Jenny is working-class while Greg comes from a rich family in Pine Valley)
3. Ex-girlfriend (Greg's ex-girlfriend, Liza Colby, refuses to allow Greg and Jenny to be happy together and schemes to displace Jenny at all costs)
4. Parents (Greg's mother, Enid Nelson, is a snob who thinks that Jenny is not good enough for her son)

== Storyline ==
Greg and Jenny build slowly on their romance due to the four obstacles. In 1982, Liza almost succeeds in winning Greg back, but Jenny returns from vacation and his infatuation with Jenny grows even stronger. Liza rigs the Miss Junior Pine Valley contest so that she will win instead of Jenny; this does not deter Greg, who eventually tells Jenny that he loves her and wants to marry her.

Jenny eventually finds out that her father, Ray Gardner (Gil Rodgers), who she thought was in prison for kidnapping is in fact in prison for rape. Liza finds out about this, and threatens to tell Greg unless Jenny withdraws herself from his life. Jenny runs away to New York City, followed by her friend Jesse Hubbard (Darnell Williams), who has been falsely accused of attempted rape by Liza, who hates him for his friendship with Jenny. Jesse saves Jenny from being forced into making a pornographic movie, and the two stand up for each other against the odds in the big city. Their summer in New York is considered one of the greatest storylines in the history of All My Children. Trying to forget Jenny, Greg begins to date Amanda Cousins (Amanda Bearse), Liza's longtime best friend who occasionally participated in Liza's scheming but is generally a much kinder person. Amanda realizes Greg is still in love with Jenny and discovers her current whereabouts which Liza persuades her to keep a secret from him. Ultimately, Amanda cannot play Lizaesque games and tells Greg where he can find Jenny. Jenny and Greg are reunited, as are Jesse and his love, Angie Baxter (Debbi Morgan).

Greg suffers a fall in 1983 and is paralyzed from the waist down. He wants the best for Jenny, so he breaks up with her romantically and encourages her to go to New York and pursue modeling. Jenny goes to the big city and eventually is engaged to another model, Tony Barclay (Brent Barrett), even though she still loves Greg.

When Greg regains the use of his legs in 1984, he goes to see Jenny so that he can salvage what they had together. They reconcile and Jenny breaks her engagement to Tony. Shortly thereafter, Greg and Jenny are married. Tony is angry that Greg has come back into Jenny's life, so he plots to kill him.

Tad Martin (Michael E. Knight), Jenny's biological brother, schedules a day of fun for Greg and Jenny at Willow Lake, just outside town. Tony wires Greg's jet ski to explode, but at the last minute, Jenny gets on the jet ski instead and she ends up being the victim. She dies at Pine Valley Hospital at the age of 20, with Greg at her side.

A few weeks later, Greg thinks that he has seen Jenny again, but it turns out to be a girl named Sheila (played by Cynthia Sullivan) who has been hired by Jenny's former modeling agent Olga Svenson as a publicity stunt. Greg becomes involved with Sheila, but the audience balks at their quick and contrived romance in the wake of Jenny's untimely death. In a late December 1984 scene (the last appearance of Sheila), Greg and Sheila are shown having sex beneath a thermal blanket on the floor of Sheila's apartment. In a rather graphic scene for daytime, Greg is shown thrusting back and forth on top of Sheila, and moaning, "Jenny, Jenny," while the camera pans to Sheila's shocked face. Sheila's landlord Myrtle Fargate later tells Greg that Sheila has left town because she realizes he never loved her; he was only trying to use her to repress his grief over losing Jenny.

Two years later in 1986, Greg leaves Pine Valley for Washington, and in 1994, Jenny returns as a ghost (seemingly accompanied by the ghost of a deceased Jesse), to help Tad escape the twister, in which the Martin house is destroyed. Tad does indeed escape. The ghosts subsequently return to Heaven.

However, it is revealed in early 2008 that Jesse did not die, but rather that he was kidnapped and that his abductors faked his death. After Jesse returns to Pine Valley and is revealed to be alive, he and his former wife, Angie, plan an extravagant wedding (since their marriage was dissolved when Jesse was declared dead). One of the invited wedding guests is Greg. Before the wedding (on May 20, 2008), they visit Jenny's grave and remember the good times spent with her. While alone, and with tears in his eyes, Greg says that he never stopped loving her. He places a single red rose at her tombstone and walks away with his friends. Greg later gets shot at the wedding but survives.

Greg appeared on Hayley Vaughan Santos' documentary about Pine Valley on January 5, 2010 and spoke of his love for Jenny.

== Reception and impact ==
The Museum of Broadcast Communications summarized the impact of Agnes Nixon's Greg and Jenny love story:

In the early 1980s, AMC's popularity soared as young people raced home (or to their dormitory lounges) at lunch time to watch the classic star-crossed romance of Jenny Gardner (Kim Delaney) and Greg Nelson (Laurence Lau). The issue was class: Jenny was from a troubled, lower-class family; Greg's mother, Enid Nelson, was Pine Valley's stereotypical snob.

The museum cites Nixon as "queen" of contemporary soap opera and notes that she is best known and most honored for introducing social issues into soap operas.

Greg and Jenny are considered to be one of the couples that made up the core stories of All My Children for a few years. Columnist Lisa L. from TV Fan Online published an article about what makes supercouples, and used Greg and Jenny as a prime example. Soap Opera Digest took notice to the pairing back in the 1980s and still credits them today as one of soap opera's greatest love stories.

Actress Kim Delaney's decision to exit the show All My Children at the height of her popularity affected fans. Delaney's character was given what is considered "daytime drama's highest honor" when her character was killed off so that no other actress could be cast in the role.

Penn State School of Theatre commented on the Greg and Jenny story when mentioning actor Laurence Lau. The university stated, "Over the years Lau has appeared in guest starring roles in prime time television series, including Law & Order, Frasier, Diagnosis Murder, Brimstone, Martial Law, and a recurring role on the hit series JAG. Lau has also had long-term contract roles on the daytime series One Life to Live, Another World, and All My Children, where he will always be remembered as one half of All My Children's most beloved high school super couple Greg and Jenny."

In 2008, About.com noted the "lasting memory" of the couple:

For many soap fans, Laurence Lau will always be remembered as one half of All My Children's most beloved high school supercouple - Greg and Jenny. Although it's been 20 years since Lau first played the role of heartthrob Greg Nelson, it was the dramatic fiery ending to his character's beloved wife which will forever remain a part of daytime history.

== See also ==
- List of supercouples
