= Sydney Penny =

American actress (born 1971)

- Born: Sydney Margaret Penny; August 7, 1971 (age 55); Nashville, Tennessee, U.S.
- Occupation: Actress
- Years active: 1979–present
- Known for: Pale Rider; The Thorn Birds; The New Gidget; All My Children; Santa Barbara; Largo Winch
- Spouse: Robert Powers (m. 1995; died 2024)
- Children: 1
- Parents: Hank Penny (father); Shari Penny (mother)
- Relatives: Greg Penny (half-brother)
- Website: www.sydneypenny.net

Sydney Margaret Penny (born August 7, 1971) is an American actress. She began her career as a child performer appearing in made-for-television movies. She made her big screen debut in the 1985 Western film Pale Rider directed by Clint Eastwood. She received a total of six Young Artist Awards nominations and won two—for playing Young Meggie Cleary in the miniseries The Thorn Birds (1983), and for Pale Rider. Penny also starred in the sitcom The New Gidget (1986–1988), and played Bernadette Soubirous in the French drama film Bernadette (1988) and its sequel The Passion of Bernadette (1990) both directed by Jean Delannoy.

Penny starred as B.J. Walker during the final season of NBC soap opera Santa Barbara (1992–1993), that earned her a nomination for a Daytime Emmy Award for Outstanding Younger Actress in a Drama Series. She later joined the cast of ABC soap opera All My Children in a recurring role spanning fifteen years (1993–97, 2002, 2005–08) as Julia Santos Keefer. Her portrayal led to her being nominated for a Daytime Emmy Award for Outstanding Supporting Actress in a Drama Series in 1995. She also starred in the drama series Hyperion Bay (1998–1999) and Largo Winch (2001–2003).

== Early life, family and education ==
Penny was born in Nashville, Tennessee, and raised in Chatsworth, California, the daughter of former Western swing bandleader and comedian Hank Penny and his second wife, Shari, who trained as an opera singer and later performed with her husband.

== Career ==
Penny began performing when she was three years old, singing during one of her parents' concerts. She made her screen debut playing a supporting role in the made-for-television movie The Night Rider (1979) starring David Selby, Kim Cattrall and Hildy Brooks. She performed as Lucy Van Pelt in the 1981 television special It's Magic, Charlie Brown and also that year appeared in the Primetime Emmy Award-nominated television movie Through the Magic Pyramid. She played Tessa Dahl in the television film The Patricia Neal Story (1981) starring Glenda Jackson and Peg Adams in The Capture of Grizzly Adams (1982). At the 4th Youth in Film Awards, Penny received two nominations for Best Young Actress in a Movie Made for Television for these performances, as well a nomination for Best Young Actress in a Television Special, for The Circle Family. She later guest-starred on Fame, T. J. Hooker, St. Elsewhere and The Twilight Zone.

In 1983, Penny played Young Meggie Cleary in the miniseries The Thorn Birds. For her performance she won Best Young Actress in a Movie Made for Television at the 5th Youth in Film Awards. In 1985 she played Megan Wheeler in the Western film Pale Rider directed by and starring Clint Eastwood. For this performance she was awarded a Young Artist Award for Exceptional Performance By a Young Actress - Motion Picture at the 7th Youth in Film Awards in December 1985. The following year, Penny went to star in the science fiction family film Hyper Sapien: People from Another Star distributed by Tri-Star Pictures. She starred as Danielle 'Dani' Collins-Griffin in the syndicated sitcom The New Gidget from 1986 to 1988. She later played the role of Bernadette Soubirous in the French drama film Bernadette (1988) and its sequel The Passion of Bernadette (1990) both directed by Jean Delannoy. She starred alongside Sophia Loren in the Italian drama film Running Away (1989), and opposite Malcolm McDowell in the Switzerland-filmed thriller film In the Eye of the Snake (1990). In 1991 she appeared in the made-for-television horror film Child of Darkness, Child of Light.

In 1992, Penny made her daytime television debut in the role of B.J. Walker in the NBC soap opera Santa Barbara, appearing on the show until its finale in 1993. For her performance, she received her first Daytime Emmy Award nomination, for Outstanding Younger Actress in a Drama Series. She then moved to another soap opera, as Julia Santos Keefer on ABC's All My Children. Her first stint in the role was from 1993 to 1996, with guest appearances in 1997 and 2002; she returned to the show in 2005. Penny left the show in May 2008 when Julia was killed off. She received a nomination for a Daytime Emmy Award for Outstanding Supporting Actress in a Drama Series in 1995. In the mid-1990s she returned to film, starring in independent productions Hearts Adrift (1996), Enchanted (1998) and The Pawn. From 1998 to 1999, Penny starred alongside Mark-Paul Gosselaar in the WB drama series Hyperion Bay. In 1999 she took the role of Meg Cummings in the NBC soap opera Sunset Beach, replacing Susan Ward for one month during Ward's filming of the movie The In Crowd. The serial's creator, Aaron Spelling, was impressed with Penny's portrayal of Meg so he cast her in another series he created; a recurring role as Josie Oliver during the final season of Beverly Hills, 90210.

From 2001 to 2003, Penny starred in the internationally-produced action adventure series, Largo Winch. In August 2003, she was cast as Samantha Kelly on The Bold and the Beautiful. The character never caught on and Penny was bumped to recurring status in late 2004. She last appeared on April 26, 2005, and rejoined All My Children a few months later. She stayed with the show for an additional three years. Since leaving daytime television, Penny guest-starred on Drop Dead Diva and Pretty Little Liars. She starred in a number of movies for Hallmark Channel and Lifetime, notably Hidden Places (2006), The Wife He Met Online (2012) and Killer Crush (2015).

Penny is the narrator of the audiobook version of her mother's 2019 children’s book The Enchanted Carousel.

== Personal life ==
In 1995, Penny married producer Robert Powers (1965–2024), whom she met while appearing in Santa Barbara; he was working behind the scenes of the show as a production coordinator. The couple moved to Wilmington, North Carolina in 2005 and had a child in 2007. Powers died of cancer on December 31, 2024, the day before his 60th birthday.

== Filmography ==
=== Film ===
Year	Title	Role	Notes
1983	The Last Leaf	Susan	
1985	Pale Rider	Megan Wheeler	Young Artist Award for Exceptional Performance by a Young Actress - Motion Picture
1986	Hyper Sapien: People from Another Star	Robyn	
1988	Bernadette	Bernadette Soubirous	
1989	Running Away	Rosetta	
1990	La Passion de Bernadette	Bernadette Soubirous	
1990	In the Eye of the Snake	Malika	
1996	Hearts Adrift	Max Deerfield	
1998	Enchanted	Natalie Ross	
1999	The Pawn	Megan	
2012	Little Red Wagon	Ashley Lagare	
2012	Ambush At Dark Canyon	Madeleine Donovan	
2013	The Perfect Summer	Alyssa	
2013	Heart of the Country	Candace	Also producer
2016	Heritage Falls	Heather Fitzpatrick	
2017	Mountain Top	Judge Coberg	
2022	Birdies	Sarah	
2022	The Dishwasher		Short film, also writer and director

=== Television ===
Year	Title	Role	Notes
1979	The Night Rider	Melissa Hollister	Television film
1981	The Big Stuffed Dog	Lily	Television film
1981	It's Magic, Charlie Brown	Lucy Van Pelt (voice)	Television special
1981	Dear Teacher	Gloria	Pilot
1981	Through the Magic Pyramid	Princess Ankelsen	Television film
1981	The Patricia Neal Story	Tessa Dahl	Television film Nominated — Young Artist Award for Best Young Actress in a Movie Made for Television
1982	The Capture of Grizzly Adams	Peg Adams	Television film Nominated — Young Artist Award for Best Young Actress in a Movie Made for Television
1982	The Circle Family		Television film Nominated — Young Artist Award for Best Young Actress in a Television Special
1982	Fame	Susan Marshall	Episode: "Beginnings"
1983	T.J. Hooker	Katie Coats	Episode: "The Mumbler"
1983	The Thorn Birds	Young Meggie Cleary	Miniseries; Young Artist Award for Best Young Actress in a Movie Made for Television
1983	Two Kinds of Love	Elizabeth	Television film
1983	St. Elsewhere	Melissa Greely	Episode: "AIDS & Comfort"
1984	Silver Spoons	Billie	Episode: "Changes"; Nominated — Young Artist Award for Best Young Actress - Guest in a Television Series
1984	Getting Physical	Ramona	Television film
1985	The Fourth Wise Man	Shameir	Television film
1985	Half Nelson		Episode: "The Beverly Hills Princess"
1985	Heart's Island	Tommy Jean Baylor	Pilot
1986	News at Eleven	Melissa Kenley	Television film
1986	The Twilight Zone	Mary Miletti	Episode: "Shadow Play/Grace Note"
1986-1988	The New Gidget	Danielle 'Dani' Collins-Griffin	Series regular, 44 episodes
1988	A Year in the Life	Megan	Episode: "The Go-Between"
1990	Super Force	Melanie Lemays	Episode: "The Gauntlet"
1991	Child of Darkness, Child of Light	Margaret Gallagher	Television film
1992	Jack's Place	Jennifer Simpson	Episode: "Forever"
1992–1993	Santa Barbara	B.J. Walker	Series regular Nominated — Daytime Emmy Award for Outstanding Younger Actress in a Drama Series; Nominated — Soap Opera Digest Award for Outstanding Female Newcomer
1993–1997, 2002, 2005–2008	All My Children	Julia Santos Keefer	Series regular Soap Opera Digest Award for Hottest Romance (1996); Nominated — Daytime Emmy Award for Outstanding Supporting Actress in a Drama Series (1995); Nominated — Soap Opera Digest Award for Outstanding Younger Lead Actress (1995)
1998	Love Boat: The Next Wave	Juliette Titlebaum	Episode: "I Can't Get No Satisfaction"
1998–1999	Hyperion Bay	Jennifer Worth	Series regular, 17 episodes
1999	Sunset Beach	Meg Cummings	40 episodes
2000	Beverly Hills, 90210	Josie Oliver	4 episodes
2001–2003	Largo Winch	Joy Arden	Series regular, 39 episodes
2003–2005	The Bold and the Beautiful	Samantha Kelly	Series regular
2005	McBride: The Doctor Is Out... Really Out	Daphne Blake	Television film
2006	Hidden Places	Eliza Monteclaire Wyatt	Television film
2010	The Wish List	Chloe	Television film
2011	Days of Our Lives	Dr. Liv Norman	7 episodes
2011	Drop Dead Diva	Ms. Kritzer	Episode: "Closure"
2012	The Wife He Met Online	Georgia	Television film
2014–2015	Pretty Little Liars	Leona Vanderwaal	Episodes: "Taking This One to the Grave" and "Through a Glass, Darkly"
2015	Killer Crush	Gaby	Television film
