= Cady McClain =

American actress, singer, and author

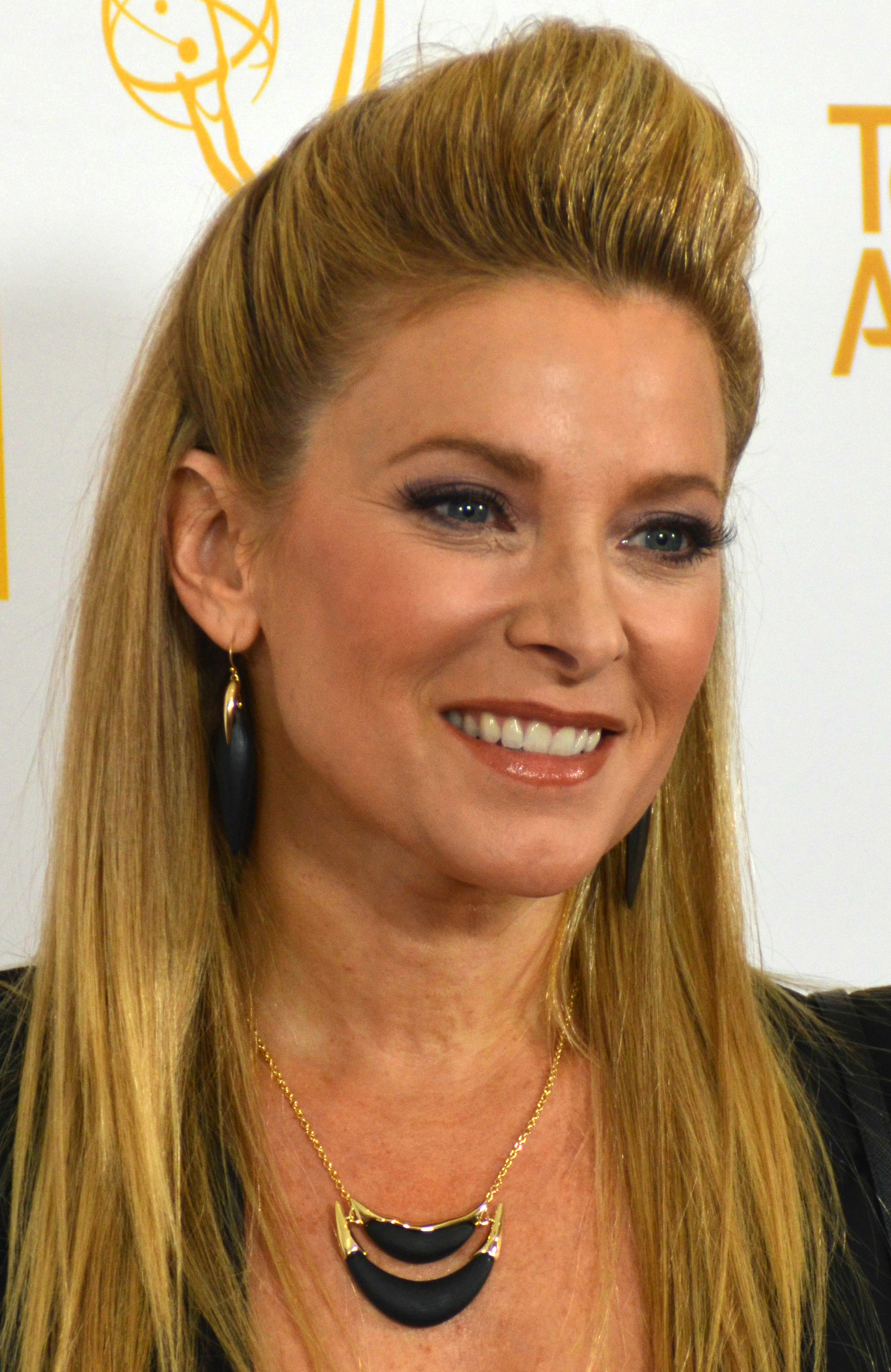
- McClain in 2014
- Born: Katie Jo McClain; October 13, 1969 (age 56)
- Occupations: Actor; television director; author; singer-songwriter
- Years active: 1978–present
- Known for: Performance in American soap opera television
- Spouse: Jon Lindstrom (m. 2014; sep. 2024)
- Website: www.cadymcclain.com

Cady McClain (born Katie Jo McClain; October 13, 1969) is an American actress, singer, and author.

== Career ==
Among McClain's notable early TV credits was a recurring role on St. Elsewhere, and an appearance on Cheers, when she was 16 years old, as Coach's niece Joyce.

Other TV credits were as Virginia in Emmy Award-winning TV movie Who Will Love My Children, opposite Ann-Margret, Robert Kennedy and His Times, as young Pat Kennedy (with River Phoenix and Chad Lowe), the ABC After School Special Just a Regular Kid: An AIDS story (with Christian Hoff and Dana Ashbrook), Danny Thomas' One Big Family (with Michael DeLuise), Spenser for Hire, (with Robert Urich and Ron LcLarty), Lou Grant, (with Ed Asner) the TV movie Home Fires (with Guy Boyd and Juliette Lewis) and the Michael McKean TV Movie, Town and Gown.

=== Film ===
Her first film was in 1982 starring opposite Peter O'Toole in My Favorite Year as Tess, his daughter. She then appeared as a dancer in the Herbert Ross film, Pennies from Heaven starring Steve Martin and Bernadette Peters.

McClain later appeared in the independent films Simple Justice, (1989) with Doris Roberts and Cesar Romero, Alma Mater (2008) with Alexander Chaplin and Will Lyman, Retreat (2004) with Michael E. Knight, and Soldier's Heart, (2008).

Soldier's Heart, a film about veterans and PTSD (with James Kiberd, directed by Brian Delate), won the prestigious Best Narrative Feature award at the GI Film Festival in Washington D.C.

In 2008, McClain also appeared in Home Movie with Adrian Pasdar. In the film, McClain plays Claire Poe, a psychiatrist, mother and wife. Home Movie, is the story of a family's descent into darkness. In a Blair Witch style mockumentary, we follow the Poe children's violent tendencies and their parents' effort to help them. Directed by Chris Denham, it won the Sitgis Film Festival Citizen Cane Award for Best Direction.

=== Theater ===
McClain began working in the theater at a very young age. Her first professional production was as a chorus girl in The Music Man and Finian's Rainbow at Fullerton College. Other small California productions followed such as Wait Until Dark and Dames at Sea. She was cast in a workshop production of the then titled 40 starring Bonnie Franklin, and was brought to New York with the production as part of a pre-Broadway tryout at the John Drew Theater in East Hampton. With lyrics by Judith Viorst, the production title was changed to Happy Birthday and Other Humiliations.

McClain went on to work with Mary Beth Peil and Ron Raines in A Little Night Music at the New York Opera Ensemble, Quiet on the Set at the Westbeth Theater, as Hero in Much Ado About Nothing at the Lincoln Center Stages, Comedy of Errors at the Hudson Theatre Guild, Barefoot in the Park at the Westbury Music Fair, Self Offense with Cucaracha Theatre, Inventions of Farewell at HERE Theatre (a one-woman show directed by Estep Nagy), and The Red Address as Lady, written by David Ives. She also wrote, produced and acted in a one-woman piece of performance art called Mona 7, which dealt with abuse and its impact on a young woman.

=== Daytime television ===
McClain won Emmys for three of her four daytime drama roles — spanning three networks, over three decades. In 2025, it was announced McClain had joined the cast of Beyond the Gates as Pamela Curtis.

=== Writing ===
In 2006, maintained a blog on the ABC website titled "Confessions of a Mad Soap Star," which earned over 2 million hits.

She is a painter, writes poetry and articles for the internet (Policymic.com, HLNTV.com, Parade.com), and plays guitar. Her website, www.cadymcclain.com, displays artwork and collages she has created as well as links to her articles. She released two books of her poetry and art in 2008, Conversations with the Invisible, and Licked.

In 2006, she released an album, Blue Glitter Fish. In 2010, she released a live album of her music, Club Passim, recorded at Club Passim in Cambridge, Massachusetts.

== Personal life ==
McClain married Jon Lindstrom on February 14, 2014. On April 27, 2024 the couple announced in the joint statement on Instagram that they were separating after 10 years of marriage.

== Filmography ==
Film
Year	Title	Role	Notes
1982	My Favorite Year	Tess	Credited as Katie McClain
1983	Who Will Love My Children?	Virginia Fray	TV movie
1989	Simple Justice	Janet DiLorenzo	
2002	Alma Mater	Gwen Knight	
2004	Retreat	Paige	
2008	Soldier's Heart	Linda	
2008	Home Movie	Clare	

Television
Year	Title	Role	Notes
1983–1985	St. Elsewhere	Erin Scheinfeld	5 episodes
1985	Robert Kennedy & His Times	Young Pat	TV mini-series
1987	One Big Family	Paige Baker	Episode: "The Tutor"
1987	Cheers	Joyce Pantusso	Episode: "The Godfather: Part 3"
1987	ABC Afterschool Special	Nicole	Episode: "Just a Regular Kid: An AIDS Story"
1988	Spenser: For Hire	Laurie	Episode: "To the End of the Line"
1988–1996, 1998–2002, 2005–2008, 2010–2011, 2013	All My Children	Dixie Cooney	Won Daytime Emmy 1990
2002–2005, 2007–2010	As the World Turns	Rosanna Cabot	Won Daytime Emmy 2004
2004	Law & Order: Special Victims Unit	Alice McCain	Episode: "Outcry"
2014–2015	The Young and the Restless	Kelly Andrews	
2020–2024	Days of Our Lives	Jennifer Horton	Won Daytime Emmy 2021
2023	Law & Order: Special Victims Unit	Patty Ryan	Season 24 episode 14 "Dutch Tears"
2023	Around the Sun (audio drama)	Grace	3 episodes
2025–present	Beyond the Gates	Pamela Curtis	Recurring

== Awards and nominations ==
List of acting awards and nominations
Year	Award	Category	Title	Result	Ref.
1990	Daytime Emmy Award	Outstanding Younger Actress in a Drama Series	All My Children	Won	
1992	Daytime Emmy Award	Outstanding Younger Actress in a Drama Series	All My Children	Nominated	
2001	Daytime Emmy Award	Outstanding Supporting Actress in a Drama Series	All My Children	Nominated	
2003	Daytime Emmy Award	Outstanding Supporting Actress in a Drama Series	As the World Turns	Nominated	
2004	Daytime Emmy Award	Outstanding Supporting Actress in a Drama Series	As the World Turns	Won	
2017	Daytime Emmy Award	Outstanding Digital Drama Series	Venice: The Series	Nominated	
2018	Daytime Emmy Award	Outstanding Digital Drama Series	Venice: The Series	Nominated	
2021	Daytime Emmy Award	Outstanding Guest Performer in a Drama Series	Days of Our Lives	Won	

== See also ==
- Tad Martin and Dixie Cooney
- Supercouple
