= Michael E. Knight =

American actor (born 1959)

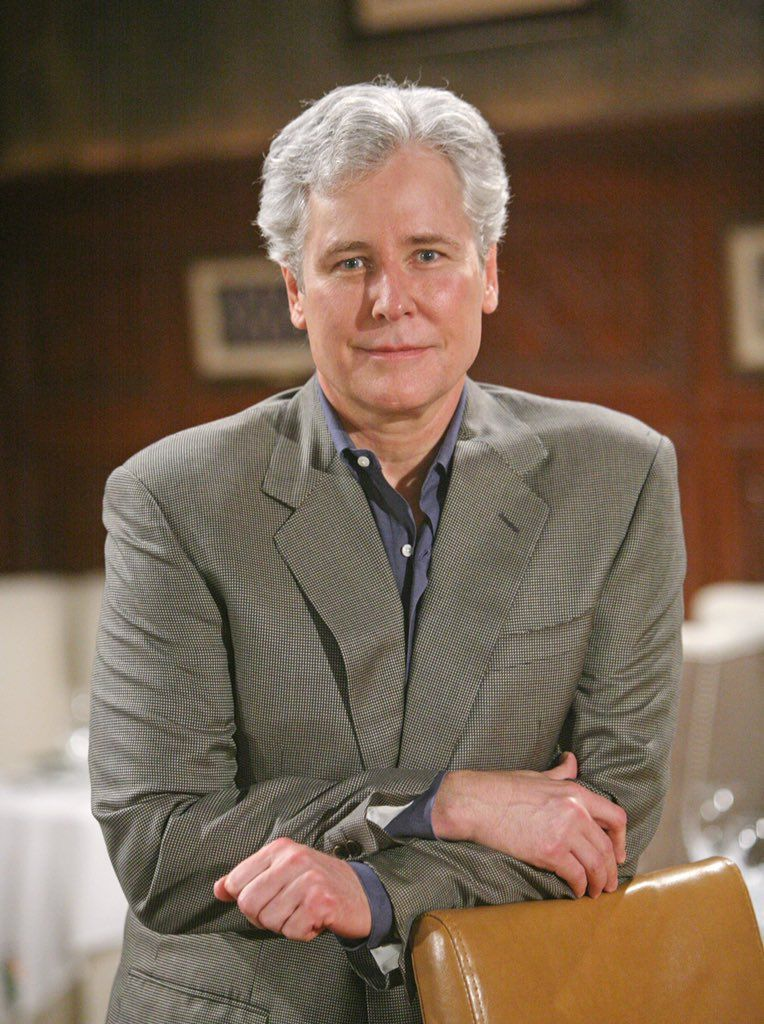
- Knight as Tad Martin on All My Children
- Born: Michael Edward Knight; May 7, 1959 (age 67); Princeton, New Jersey, U.S.
- Occupation: Actor
- Years active: 1982–present
- Spouse: Catherine Hickland (m. 1992; div. 2006)

Michael Edward Knight (born May 7, 1959) is an American television actor, best known for his role as Tad Martin on ABC soap opera All My Children.

== Biography ==
Knight was born in Princeton, New Jersey. He was educated at The Thacher School in Ojai, California, and attended Wesleyan University, graduating in 1980, a year ahead of schedule.

Knight's first major acting role was portraying Tad Martin on the soap opera All My Children. His first stint on the show ran from 1982–1986. He returned from 1988–1990, and again from 1992 until the ABC series finale in 2011 and the online revival of the series in 2013. Knight also appeared as Ted Orsini on AMC from 1993–1994. His reason for initially leaving All My Children was to pursue acting projects on the West Coast, which included a starring role in the feature film Date with an Angel (1987), and various primetime appearances — including Murder, She Wrote, Dear John and Grapevine. Knight co-starred in the off-Broadway play Wrong Turn at Lungfish, and he appeared in the ABC movie for television She Stood Alone: The Tailhook Scandal, and in the off-Broadway Cakewalk with Linda Lavin.

Knight was honored with two Daytime Emmy Awards for Outstanding Younger Actor in a Drama Series (1986 and 1987). In 2001, he was honored with his third Daytime Emmy Award for Outstanding Supporting Actor in a Drama Series. He also received the 1997 Soap Opera Digest Award for 'Best Supporting Actor' and a nomination in the same category in 1998. In 2005, he was nominated for an Emmy for 'Outstanding Leading Actor'.

Knight was married from June 27, 1992 through 2006 to One Life to Live star Catherine Hickland, who was previously married to actor David Hasselhoff who coincidentally had played a character named "Michael Knight".

Knight and Hickland were honored for their charitable work by the West End Intergenerational Residence in Manhattan in 1999.

In 2015 and 2016, Knight had a recurring role as Dr. Simon Neville on CBS' The Young and the Restless. On February 2, 2017, Knight made a surprise appearance on the Hallmark Channel's Home & Family show, where he was reunited with a number of his former All My Children castmates.

On September 30, 2019, Knight began appearing in a recurring role on General Hospital as lawyer Martin Gray.

== Select filmography ==
Television and film roles
Year	Title	Role	Notes
1982–1986, 1988–1990, 1992–2011, 2013	All My Children	Tad Martin	Regular role
1987	Date with an Angel	Jim Sanders	Film
1988	Matlock	Daniel Fontaine	Episode: "The Magician"
1993	Hexed	Simon Littlefield	Film
1993–1994	All My Children	Ted Orsini	Recurring role
1996	A Different Kind of Christmas	Alan Schaefer	TV film
2001	Law & Order: Special Victims Unit	David Steadman	Episode: "Redemption"
2003, 2005	One Life to Live	Tad Martin	Guest role (crossover)
2011	Hot in Cleveland	himself	Episodes: "I Love Lucci: Parts One & Two"
2015–2016	The Young and the Restless	Simon Neville	Recurring role
2015	NCIS	Leland Robert Spears	Episode: "Blast From The Past"
2019–present	General Hospital	Martin Grey	Recurring role

== See also ==
- Tad Martin and Dixie Cooney
