= Joe Martin (All My Children) =

- All My Children character
- Ray MacDonnell as Joe Martin
- Portrayed by: Ray MacDonnell
- Duration: 1970–2011; 2013
- First appearance: January 5, 1970
- Last appearance: September 2, 2013
- Created by: Agnes Nixon
- Introduced by: Agnes Nixon; Bud Kloss
In-universe information
- Occupation: Doctor of Internal Medicine; Chief of Staff (pre-2002, 2003–08); Volunteer for Habitat for Humanity
- Family: Martin
- Parents: Henry Martin; Kate Martin
- Brothers: Paul Martin
- Spouse: Helen Martin (1946–69); Ruth Martin (1972–)
- Sons: Jeff Martin; Bobby Martin; Jake Martin
- Daughters: Tara Martin
- Adoptive sons: Tad Martin
- Stepsons: Phil Brent (adoptive)
- Grandsons: Josh Madden; Charlie Brent; Damon Miller (adoptive); Jamie Martin (adoptive); Trevor Martin; Sam Grey (great)
- Granddaughters: Kelsey Jefferson; Kathy Martin (adoptive); Jenny Martin (adoptive)
- Nieces: Beth Martin

Joe Martin is a fictional character on the ABC Daytime and The Online Network soap opera All My Children. Ray MacDonnell played the character from the show's inception on January 5, 1970, until his retirement on January 5, 2010. He reprised his role for three episodes in March 2011, and again for two episodes in September 2011 for the show's ABC finale. The character is the longest running original character, the second being his former daughter-in-law Erica Kane. In 2005, MacDonnell received a Lifetime Achievement Award at the Daytime Emmys.

MacDonnell's 2010 retirement was brought on by the production of the show moving from New York to Los Angeles. The character of Joe along with his longtime wife Ruth leave town and retire to Florida. MacDonnell reprised his role as Joe Martin on the Prospect Park's continuation of All My Children.

== Storylines ==
Dr. Joe Martin, the head of one of the founding families in Pine Valley, was a widower raising two children, Jeff and Tara, when he met Ruth Brent, a nurse at the hospital where he worked. He fell hard for her but she married and had to resist his love and attraction. But Ruths alcoholic husband died in a car accident and Joe comforted her. The two fell in love and married in April 1972.

The 1970s were a challenging time for the Martin marriage which was tested numerous times. Joes daughter Tara and Ruths son Phil married and had a troubled marriage which also caused rifts between Joe and Ruth. In 1976, Ruth had an affair with a younger man named David Thorton and he even asked her to run off with him. She accepted his proposal and made plans to divorce Joe but the night she was ask for her divorce Joe collapsed. Ruth realized her love for Joe was stronger than ever and broke it off with David.

In 1978, the couple made plans to adopt a boy of their own named Tad, and the plans were thrown into trouble by the reappearance of Tad's biological father Ray Gardner. Ray threatened and blackmailed the Martins and when Joe refused to give into his demands, he attacked and raped Ruth in a parking lot. Ruth was left in a coma and nearly dead. Ray was sent to prison. Ruth survived the trauma.

In 1979, the Martins had a surprise child of their own, Joey. In 1981, the Martins briefly separated over his feelings for a patient he was treating but the couple reconciled as always.

When Charles Tyler, Chief of Staff, died, Joe assumed his position. His history at Pine Valley Hospital has been nearly impeccable, except for a brief time when he was forced to step down by allegations made by conniving David Hayward. Joe has survived a tornado that almost took Tad's life, had a massive heart attack brought on by a confrontation with Dimitri Marick, and dealt with all the problems that have affected his children. He is the patriarch of Pine Valley and usually the steady voice of reason.
