= Nancy Grant (All My Children) =

Fictional character in the American soap opera All My Children

- All My Children character
- Portrayed by: Lisa Wilkinson (1973–1995); Avis McCarther (1975)
- Duration: 1973–1984; 1995
- First appearance: 1973
- Last appearance: 1995
- Created by: Agnes Nixon
- Introduced by: Agnes Nixon and Bud Kloss (1973); Felicia Minei Behr (1995)
In-universe information
- Other names: Nancy Blair; Nancy Fisher
- Occupation: Social worker
- Husband: Frank Grant (until 1977, 1980–1982); Carl Blair, Sr. (1978); Bill Fisher (1984–present)
- Sons: Carl Blair, Jr.

Nancy Grant is a fictional character from All My Children, an American soap opera on the ABC network, played by Lisa Wilkinson from 1973 until 1984, with a brief return in early 1995.

Nancy was the first Black female leading character on All My Children, and for many years she was one of the most recognizable Black female characters on daytime television. Wilkinson was married in real life to John Danelle, who played Nancy's husband Dr. Frank Grant, and many media outlets chose to interview the couple together.

== Storylines ==
=== Before arrival ===
Nancy Grant, the wife of Dr. Franklin "Frank" Grant (John Danelle), is a successful social worker whose work often takes her to Chicago. She is first mentioned in 1972, a year before Lisa Wilkinson's first appearance, when Frank's friend Dr. Jeff Martin (Charles Frank) wonders aloud if his marriage to model Erica Kane (Susan Lucci) will work out due to Erica's constant work travels. Frank reassures Jeff and tells him that his own marriage is doing well despite Nancy being away in Chicago, so Jeff has nothing to worry about in his own relationship. However, things were not as solid in Frank's marriage as he thought.

=== 1973–1979 ===
Nancy first appears in Pine Valley in 1973. Frank hopes that she will stay in Pine Valley for good, but she informs him that she has signed a contract that would take her back to Chicago for work for 18 months. Nancy returns for good to Pine Valley in 1975, or so Frank thought. After a few months, Nancy (briefly played by Avis McCarther during this time) announces her intention to live and work full-time in Chicago. At first Frank did not mind as there was little change to their current arrangement, but ultimately the long-distance marriage ended when Frank filed for divorce in 1977; it was finalized later that year.

In the time while Nancy was out of town, Frank began training Dr. Chuck Tyler (Richard Van Vleet) at Pine Valley Hospital and forged a connection with Nurse Caroline Murray (Patricia Dixon). Caroline was a Vietnam veteran who suffered from nightmares and flashbacks to her time on the front lines, and Frank helped her put a lot of those distressing thoughts and emotions behind her. After Nancy and Frank's divorce was finalized, Frank and Caroline immediately started dating. Nancy returns to Pine Valley; after seeing Frank, they make love once despite Frank being intimately involved with Caroline. Frank pledges to himself to keep the one-time event a secret from Caroline, and they eventually marry.

In the months after Nancy and Frank slept together, the audience learned four facts: that when Nancy and Frank reunited for one night, she was already involved with another man, a businessman in Chicago named Carl Blair (James K. Carroll); that Carl Blair is white; that Nancy is pregnant; and that the baby is Frank's and not Carl's. All the while, Caroline Murray, the new Mrs. Grant, is unaware any infidelity on her husband's part took place.

What eventually dooms Frank's marriage to Caroline is the issue of the child, who Nancy gives birth to in 1978 (coinciding with actress Lisa Wilkinson's real-life pregnancy with daughter Amanda), a son named Carl Blair, Jr. As the child's name suggests, Nancy decides to marry Carl (now played by Steven James) and pass off Frank's baby as Carl's, with only Nancy and Carl knowing the baby's true paternity. The plan ultimately fails, as Carl is gravely injured in an airplane crash just before he and Nancy were set to marry; they exchange vows in the hospital shortly before his death. Nancy Grant became Nancy Blair and was married for less than one day. Wilkinson calls this storyline Nancy's most controversial.

In 1979, Frank learns that Nancy had kept Carl Jr.'s paternity from him. This comes about after Frank learns that Nancy has begun to date his doctor colleague Russell "Russ" Anderson (then played by David Pendleton). When Nancy and Caroline both notice Frank's jealousy, this leads to arguments between Frank and both women on separate occasions. During Frank and Nancy's argument, Nancy reveals that Caroline learned of Carl Jr.'s paternity just before Carl Sr. died in the hospital and didn't tell him. Frank moves to divorce Caroline and refuses to see her.

Nancy softens her stance toward allowing Frank unsupervised time with Carl Jr. when Frank saves Nancy's life after she is mugged and brutally beaten while on a work call. Frank takes Carl Jr. to a playground with his new girlfriend Betsy Kennicott (Carla Dragoni), which ends in Carl Jr. suffering a spinal injury after falling from playground equipment. Frank paid more attention to Betsy than to Carl Jr., leaving the child injured and Nancy furious. Nancy tells Russ that she will vow never to allow Frank to adopt Carl Jr. after the playground accident, remarking that Carl Jr. already has a father, namely the late Carl Blair, Sr. This infuriates Frank, who sets out not only to get parental rights for Carl Jr. but also to win Nancy back for good.

=== 1980–1984, 1995 ===
Nancy and Russ (now played by Charles Brown) become engaged to be married. Despite Frank attempting to persuade her to come back to him, Nancy convinces herself that she loves Russ. The night before her wedding, however, Nancy unexpectedly shows up on Frank's doorstep and tells him she loves him and not Russ. Frank and Nancy remarry on Thanksgiving Day 1980.

In her last few years on the program, Wilkinson and her character Nancy were showcased less and less. This was due to the emergence of the wildly popular character Jesse Hubbard (Darnell Williams), who began appearing on All My Children in early 1981. Jesse was Frank's nephew and he moved to Pine Valley after the death of Frank's sister Ellie (Mary Alice), in the hope that Pine Valley would be a better environment than the gritty Center City (Note: Like Pine Valley, Center City is a fictional Pennsylvania municipality on All My Children. It is not to be confused with the downtown section of Philadelphia, which is also referred to as Center City.) where the Hubbards came from (and where Jesse no longer had family). Shortly after arriving, Frank and Nancy's house almost burned down after a cigarette of Jesse's started a blaze. Despite arriving in Pine Valley ignorant and racist, Jesse's storyline in which he becomes best friends with a white classmate, Jenny Gardner (Kim Delaney), was very popular with viewers and endeared him to the audience. Jesse identified with Jenny more than he did with Frank and Nancy and sought Jenny's advice on various topics over theirs.

Frank introduces Jesse to Angela "Angie" Baxter (Debbi Morgan) in 1982, when she volunteers as a candy striper at Pine Valley Hospital. Angie's father Les (Antonio Fargas), an upper-middle-class attorney, doesn't think Jesse is good enough for his daughter. Later that year, Frank suffers a stroke during a heated argument with Les about Jesse and Angie. Despite Les's wife Pat (Lee Chamberlin) immediately sending for an ambulance, the stroke Frank suffered was fatal. Nancy tried to move on with her life in Pine Valley but it was difficult. She becomes romantically involved with newscaster Bill Fisher (Samuel E. Wright), and in April 1984 they are married. Nancy, Bill, and Carl Jr. (Billy Mack) leave together for their new life in Chicago, and the Grant house was officially signed over to Jesse. Nancy returns to Pine Valley briefly for All My Children's 25th anniversary celebrations in 1995.

== Impact and reception ==
=== Conception and casting ===
"If she didn't exist, we blacks wouldn't be on here [soap operas] at all."

— Lisa Wilkinson, on Agnes Nixon

All My Children creator Agnes Nixon, pleasantly surprised by the critical and ratings success of the storylines involving One Life to Live's Black heroine, Carla Gray (played by Ellen Holly), was interested in casting a wife for Dr. Frank Grant, All My Children's first Black character, who first appeared on the canvas in 1972. In early 1973, Lisa Wilkinson visited her husband John Danelle, who played Frank, at All My Children's Manhattan studio. By chance, Agnes Nixon was visiting the studio at the same time, and bumped into Danelle and Wilkinson. Nixon, already considering actresses for the role of Nancy, said to Wilkinson, "Oh, I didn't know John was married. Are you, by any chance, an actress?" Wilkinson, who was working as a sales clerk at a local department store in between acting jobs, said "Yes, yes." Nixon placed Lisa Wilkinson in consideration for the role of Nancy and the part was eventually cast with her in the role.

=== Impact on daytime television ===
"Nancy was one of the few black role models on soap operas. I'm proud that she was a special character – a black lady with dignity, intelligence, and warmth."

— Lisa Wilkinson on the impact of Nancy Grant on daytime television as she exited the role in 1984.

Integration of the U.S. daytime soap operas occurred slowly but steadily throughout the late 1960s and into the 1970s. In 1968, only three Black actors appeared in a recurring capacity or higher on U.S. soaps, with two of those being Nixon's characters on One Life to Live, Llanview Hospital housekeeping director Sadie Gray (Lillian Hayman) and her daughter, the aforementioned Carla Gray played by Ellen Holly. Nixon believed in soap operas telling socially relevant stories, and her soap operas would do just that, with actors who weren't always white, unlike how the daytime TV landscape used to be.

All My Children became the second most-popular daytime soap in the African American viewership demographic by the mid-1970s, and the show's loyal Black viewership came as a direct result of Black actors like Wilkinson and Danelle receiving their own storylines as opposed to only playing secondary roles in white characters' storylines. Lisa Wilkinson's popularity, particularly among Black households, endured in many respects because there were so few Black leading roles for women on U.S. soap operas; for a portion of the 1970s, actresses Ellen Holly and Lisa Wilkinson played the soaps' only Black heroines.

=== Real-life marriage of actors Wilkinson and Danelle ===
In the 1970s, the popularity of the daytime soap opera was at its peak, with TIME magazine writing a cover story on the impact of daytime soaps in 1976, and Ebony magazine publishing a feature detailing the impact of "Blacks on the Soaps" two years later. On the cover of TIME was arguably soaps' most popular couple at the time, Doug and Julie from NBC's Days of Our Lives, whose actors, Bill Hayes and Susan Seaforth Hayes, were married in real life.

The media was also interested in Lisa Wilkinson and John Danelle, primarily for the same reason. As previously mentioned, Wilkinson and Danelle were already married in real life when she made her first appearance as Frank's wife Nancy on All My Children in 1973. Wilkinson and Danelle graced the cover of Jet together, and were featured in interviews and features which were published in Ebony, TV Guide, and People. As far as working together was concerned, Wilkinson commented to Jet in 1979 that working with her husband gave her comfort as she trusted him implicitly. Wilkinson admitted at the time that she was "a prude" when it comes to kissing other men on-camera. Wilkinson and Danelle divorced in 1982, and Danelle was written out of All My Children that year as well.

=== Rise in popularity of Jesse Hubbard ===
By the early 1980s, over two dozen Black actors would appear in recurring capacities or higher on U.S. daytime soaps. With the new generation of Black representation on soaps, many of these actors and characters would receive positive fan reaction on par with the most popular white actors and characters. In January 1981, All My Children introduced the character of 16-year-old Jesse Hubbard, played by 25-year-old actor Darnell Williams. Unlike Frank and Nancy, who were portrayed as Black middle-class professionals, Jesse's family is working-class, and when Jesse's mother, a widowed single parent, dies, Frank and Nancy offer to take him in.

The character of Jesse was a near-overnight success with viewers and became very popular, to the point where the main Black storyline on All My Children no longer revolved around Nancy nor Frank, but around Jesse. As a result, Wilkinson's screen time declined beginning in 1981, with her role reduced from primary heroine to supporting character, underscored by the death of Danelle's character Frank in 1982. In 1984, as she was exiting the show, Wilkinson said to journalist Connie Passalacqua, "When I pushed for a storyline of my own I was told that there was only room for one black storyline on a show...Oh well, I guess that's just the writers' prerogative."

By her final year on the show, Wilkinson had many misgivings about her lack of storyline, in particular Nancy's romance with Bill Fisher, which went from dating to engagement in two scenes. In the same interview with Passalacqua, Wilkinson said, "It was becoming more and more evident that Nancy would not be having a storyline of her own, so I decided it's time to leave the show now. I choose to pursue things that are more challenging to my talents such as singing, theater, and other TV projects." After leaving All My Children, Wilkinson went into another kind of recording studio, and she started work on an album.

== See also ==
- All My Children storylines (1970–1979)
