= Billy Douglas (One Life to Live) =

- One Life to Live character
- Portrayed by: Ryan Phillippe
- Duration: 1992–94
- First appearance: June 2, 1992
- Last appearance: June 22, 1994
- Created by: Michael Malone and Josh Griffith
- Introduced by: Linda Gottlieb
In-universe information
- Other names: William Douglas
- Occupation: College student at Yale University
- Parents: Walter Douglas; Virginia Douglas

Billy Douglas is a fictional character on the American soap opera One Life to Live. Newcomer actor Ryan Phillippe played the role from June 2, 1992, until May 1993, with a brief appearance in June 1994. The character is the first openly gay teenager featured in a television series, and Phillippe's breakthrough role is considered groundbreaking in daytime television.

== Creation ==
=== Casting and background ===
In 1992, One Life to Live executive producer Linda Gottlieb hired a fresh-faced 17-year-old Ryan Phillippe to play the newly created role. Phillippe said he was warned against playing the "risky" role at the height of the AIDS crisis in the United States. Phillippe said that when he auditioned to play the character, he "had no idea Billy was gay." He initially expressed reservation to pursue the opportunity, telling Entertainment Weekly in 1992, "I thought, 'What is my family going to think? What about my friends?' But I realized that for [the character] Billy, the torment is a hundred times that."

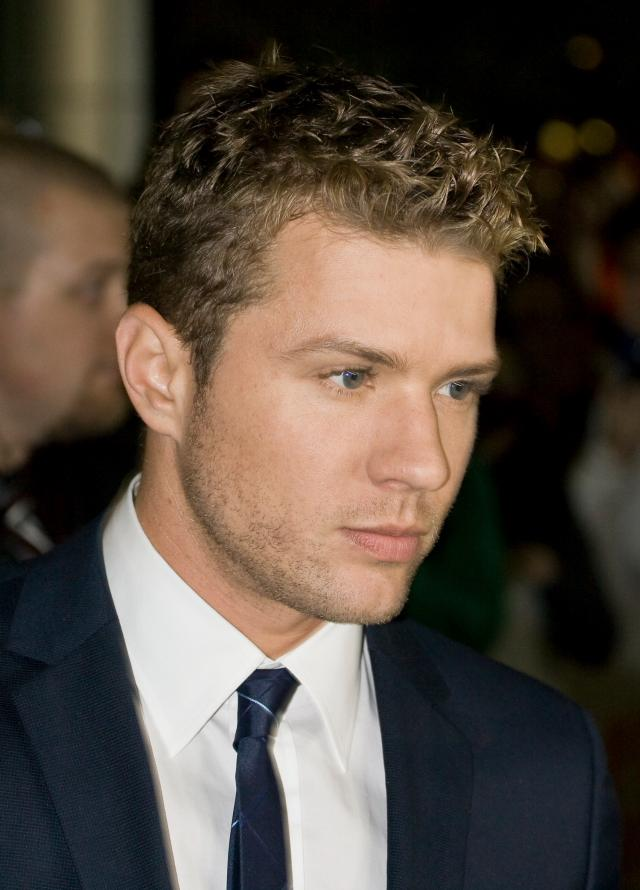
Ryan Phillippe (pictured here in 2010) portrayed Billy Douglas from 1992 to 1993.

Show head writer Michael Malone developed Billy Douglas as a popular but closeted high school junior who is a jock that becomes class president. At the time, the role was regarded as "one of the longest and complex narratives to deal with a lesbian or gay character."

When playing the role, Phillippe said that he hoped to leave a positive impact, saying, "Maybe some kids will see that there are ways to deal with this positively." Years after leaving soap operas and starting his film career, Phillippe said of playing the character, "I felt lucky playing the first gay teenager on television—not just daytime, but television, period."

=== Characterization ===
The role was portrayed as a heroic figure, displaying traits of courage in spite of facing homophobia from his father Walter (Jonathan Hogan), high school classmates, and members of the fictional Llanview community.

== Storylines ==
Homophobia is stirred in fictional Llanview in early 1992 with new arrivals to town Reverend Andrew Carpenter (Wortham Krimmer), and Andrew's father and retired army general Sloan Carpenter (Roy Thinnes). Sloan is newly diagnosed with Hodgkin's lymphoma and had come to town to make peace with his son Andrew. Andrew then seeks out to make peace with his father about his gay brother, William, who died of the HIV/AIDS virus off-screen and who Sloan is ashamed of.

Billy (Phillippe) arrives in the Philadelphia Main Line suburb in June 1992. A junior at Llanview High School, he befriends Joey Buchanan (Chris McKenna), the son of town heroine and series protagonist Victoria Lord Buchanan (Erika Slezak). Closeted Billy comes out to Joey, who is shocked but accepting of his friend's sexual orientation, choosing to stay friends. A conflicted Billy comes out to Reverend Carpenter on June 26, 1992, and seeks counseling about coming out to his parents.

Andrew encourages Billy to embrace his sexuality and to do what he feels is right. Town pariah Marty Saybrooke (Susan Haskell) eavesdrops on Billy and Andrew's counseling session. Marty seeks a romantic relationship with Andrew, but her advances are rebuffed. Angry, Marty goes to Billy's parents and tells them Andrew is a homosexual and molesting Billy. Billy's parents, Walter (Hogan) and Virginia Douglas (Susan Pellegrino), proceed to wage a campaign against the moral character of Reverend Carpenter and his Saint James Church. Andrew's girlfriend Cassie Callison (Laura Koffman) receives an anonymous letter calling her a "fag lover." The church is vandalized with hate speech, leading its vestry to ask the priest to come out, but he refuses, avowing a right to privacy. Andrew campaigns to bring the NAMES Project AIDS Memorial Quilt to Llanview and place a patch on it in honor of his brother, which angers Sloan.

Prejudice takes hold in Llanview in June 1992, and new police lieutenant Maggie Vega (Yvette Lawrence) takes names of gay officers on her police squad. Andrew implores Marty to retract her accusation, but she refuses. When the AIDS quilt arrives in Llanview, Andrew is beaten in a hate crime, and parishioners bar him from returning to the church. At the church, Billy defends Andrew in a protest led by his parents to allow Andrew into the church.

At the pulpit, Andrew delivers a stirring sermon on privacy and tolerance, swaying all of his congregation but Billy's father, who encourages parishioners to rebuke the priest. Billy comes out to his father, who rejects him. His mother Virginia espouses her support in spite of hatred from some townspeople, some of whom begin to accept him. The reputation of Reverend Carpenter is restored, as he succeeds in winning hearts and minds, while Marty's reputation is tarnished even further.

Billy is briefly paired in a romantic relationship with waiter Rick Mitchell (Joe Fiske) in December 1992, but Billy leaves Llanview to start college at Yale University in New Haven, Connecticut in the spring of 1993, thus ending the character's time on the show. The character makes an appearance in an episode aired in June 1994 and is subsequently never mentioned again.

== Reception ==
The character of Billy, created by Michael Malone, is considered one of the first serious attempts at portraying young gay characters on American television. The portrayal of the role by newcomer actor Ryan Phillippe was well received. Authors Robin Anderson and Jonathan Gray say, "Billy's story was an important TV milestone in that he was depicted as a well-adjusted and functional gay teen."

Hundreds to thousands of pieces of fan mail arrived at the show's Lincoln Square, New York City studios at ABC due to both Phillippe and character's popularity. The actor called the fan response in the letters "amazing," and said, "Kids who'd never seen themselves represented on TV or in movies would write to say what a huge support they found it to be." Interestingly, gay teenagers were not the audience for which the story was targeted, but rather prejudiced viewers, in the style of series creator and original head writer Agnes Nixon and her Carla Gray character played by actress Ellen Holly. GLAAD lauded Ryan Phillippe for his work in playing Billy.

The program began receiving negative fan mail amid pairing Billy in a romantic relationship with Rick Mitchell (Joe Fiske) in December 1992, and wrote the character out with Phillippe leaving the series in 1993, with one show writer remarking that it was "difficult to maintain a homosexual character as a hero." In spite of any difficulty with showcasing the role, a viewer expressed disappointment with the "well-researched, well-written" character being written off the show to Soap Opera Digest, continuing that "[Michael] Malone is doing a great disservice by not opening up the next chapter in this character's life."
