= Carla Gray =

Fictional character in the American soap opera One Life to Live

- One Life to Live character
- Ellen Holly as Carla Gray
- Portrayed by: Ellen Holly
- Duration: 1968–1980; 1983–1985
- First appearance: October 7, 1968
- Last appearance: September 13, 1985
- Created by: Agnes Nixon
- Introduced by: Doris Quinlan; Jean Arley (1983)
In-universe information
- Other names: Carla Benari; Clara Gray; Carla Hall
- Occupation: Actress; Secretary; Lawyer
- Mother: Sadie Gray
- Spouse: Ed Hall (1973–1979); Jack Scott (1979–1980)
- Adoptive sons: Josh Hall
- Grandsons: Jared Hall (adoptive)
- Aunts and uncles: Hazel Scott

Carla Gray is a fictional character from the American soap opera One Life to Live, played by actress Ellen Holly. Carla appeared from October 1968 through December 1980, and from May 1983 through September 1985. The role is recognized as the first Black lead character on an American daytime soap opera.

Carla was one of the original characters created for the show and was featured in a groundbreaking and very controversial storyline about race relations. Carla was a lighter-skinned Black American passing as a white woman (specifically an Italian American). The fact that the character of Carla was actually Black was not revealed to the show's audience until about five months after Ellen Holly debuted in the role. The revelation was a major shock to viewers, and the series was boycotted by one Southern affiliate. Nevertheless, the controversy attracted much attention and ratings shot up for the then-fledgling soap.

== Storylines ==
=== 1968–1974 ===
At the series debut of One Life to Live in July 1968, Black American former housemaid Sadie Gray (Lillian Hayman) lives in an apartment next door to the white Polish American Wolek family and works as the manager of housekeeping for Llanview Hospital. Sadie acts mainly as a confidante for troubled heroine Anna Wolek (Doris Belack) but makes several passing references to a daughter, Clara, who she vaguely says is "lost to her." Anna and the rest of the Woleks assume that Sadie's daughter Clara is dead.

"A woman came to town with a mystery. Everybody knew she was important, because she was on almost every day of the week. So they knew that she was going to be some kind of major story but they couldn't figure out what she was gonna be, because she wasn't the usual blonde, blue-eyed leading female. She looked very...exotic. And she had this exotic name, Carla Benari."

— Ellen Holly on the beginnings of her One Life to Live character, Television Academy Foundation

A few months into the series' run, Dr. Jim Craig (Robert Milli) begins treating a young woman named "Carla Benari," whose illness seems to be psychosomatic — her physical symptoms stem from some unstated mental conflict. Carla, who is assumed to be Italian American, begins working as Jim's receptionist. Very quickly, Carla begins dating Black American resident physician Price Trainor (Peter DeAnda). ABC received several angry letters decrying the portrayal of a Black man dating a white woman.

Carla soon strikes up a friendship with Anna herself. On a visit to the Wolek apartment, Carla runs into Sadie. It is abruptly revealed that "Carla Benari" is Clara Gray, who had not died but run away from home at an early age. Sadie was furious to learn that her daughter was pretending to be white, as Sadie knew about Carla's whereabouts prior to her arrival and instead let people think Clara was dead, as opposed to actively living with the shame of a daughter who denied her heritage. Carla herself is mortified to know Sadie already knows the truth — but she's not mortified enough to end her ruse there and then. Although heartbroken after their first encounter in years, Sadie chooses not to reveal her daughter's secret.

"[In] the fifth month in which everybody's invested all their energy in learning about these people for these five months, that day, on a Friday — deliberately chosen for Friday — the cameras started following a whole bunch of people during their daily [routines], including Carla and Sadie...And at the end of the day, five minutes before that, Sadie and Carla Benari meet in front of Anna Wolek's door. [Sadie's] visiting her neighbor. [Carla's] going there for some other reason. They stand there and they look at each other and Sadie looks at me and says, "Clara!" And I say, "Mama!" Cut to black! Well, everybody got on the phone that week: "Did you see that on Friday? Clara, that dead girl, that was supposed to...?" ...The world checked in on Monday to get the backstory. The backstory was that she was an actress and she wanted to be a big star and she went to the bright lights of the big city and found out nobody could give a damn, and also it wasn't helpful to be Black, so she started passing for white, and that didn't do too well either, and she ended up on some lousy bus-and-truck tour that had come back to town."

— Ellen Holly on the five-month buildup and eventual payoff of the early "Carla Benari" storyline, Television Academy Foundation

While Carla and Sadie try to work out their issues, Carla becomes embroiled in a love triangle. Her employer Jim Craig also falls in love with her, and she reciprocates his feelings. Carla divulges her secret to Jim. Not only is he fine with her true racial makeup, he asks her to marry him, allowing her a chance to continue publicly as "Carla Benari." The show found itself in another controversy when one ABC affiliate in Lubbock, Texas, went so far as to temporarily drop One Life to Live from its daytime lineup as a result of this storyline.

Carla briefly accepts the proposal but eventually returns Jim's ring, after realizing she would only be marrying him in order to keep perpetuating a lie. After breaking up with Jim, Carla comes clean to everyone in Llanview about her true heritage, including Price. Price is not in the least sympathetic to Carla's predicament. If anything, he is even angrier than Sadie at Carla's ruse. However, he does give her one more chance after she breaks up with Jim. Price's mother ruins the relationship as she does not like Carla. Price accepts a job overseas soon afterward and leaves Llanview at the end of 1970. Carla is able to mend fences with her mother, who stresses that she must be proud of her heritage. Taking her mother's advice to heart, Carla embraces being Black, and changes her surname back to "Gray" while keeping the first name "Carla." (For her part, Sadie would continue to call Carla "Clara", signifying full and proud public recognition of her daughter after previously letting people believe she was dead, and as Carla had embraced her heritage, she would respond to "Clara" from Sadie.)

In 1972, Carla finds herself in another love triangle, this time being courted by high-flying politico Bert Skelly (Herb Davis), and police lieutenant Ed Hall (Al Freeman, Jr.). Bert is a slick career politician who seems to promise the good life that Carla desires. Ed is a blue-collar, "salt of the earth" workingman who initially considers Carla to be a stuck-up princess. In time though, Ed proves to be the love of Carla's life, and the two became engaged in 1973.

However, the road to the altar is not an easy one. Ed blames himself for the death of his good friend Meredith Lord Wolek (Lynn Benesch), who is killed during a hostage crisis by Earl Brock (Kevin Conway) at the Lord family estate, Llanfair at the same time that Carla finds her life on the line. This forces them to postpone the wedding as Carla is first nearly killed when her brakes fail while she is driving, and again when she is lured to the jeweler's by a mysterious man who poses as a policeman. Carla meets with the man, who points a gun at her and almost shoots her, but Joe Riley (Lee Patterson) comes to her rescue. The man after Carla is revealed to be Lester Brock, the brother of Earl Brock, who blamed Ed for the murder of his brother. Ed and Carla make it to the altar in October and, surrounded by friends and family, they are married. Carla and Ed also initiate proceedings to adopt Joshua West (Laurence Fishburne), a street kid who Ed had taken in while romancing Carla. Josh soon took the surname Hall and became a son to Ed and Carla.

=== 1975–1985 ===
By the mid-1970s, airtime for Carla, Ed, and Josh progressively diminished. Carla appears in a supporting capacity in the Jenny Wolek (Katherine Glass) and Tim Siegel (Tom Berenger) romance storyline as a friend of Jenny's and as the steadfast confidante of longtime friend Anna Wolek. In late 1975, Josh becomes involved with a girl, Bernice, who is a bad influence on him, asking him for expensive concert tickets he can't afford on his part-time job's wages. Ed gives Josh the money for the concert tickets, but informs him that he won't be giving him any more money if he asks again. Josh would later get fired from his job when Bernice asks him to stay with her to study for a test instead of showing up to his work shift. Carla, tired of being the disciplinarian and afraid of Josh growing up to resent her, insists that Ed put his foot down with Josh about what a bad influence Bernice is. To distract Josh from Bernice, Ed gets him a job working construction on the new nightclub Tony's Place, finally putting Carla's mind at ease.

Toward the end of the decade, Carla did get the spotlight in one more love triangle: she divorces Ed to marry Dr. Jack Scott (Arthur Burghardt), a surgeon who arrived in Llanview in 1978 and operated on Ed to fix his heart condition. Holly, with the input of Al Freeman, Jr., wrote a 30-page outline for the two-year love triangle storyline, which was approved (albeit with some changes) by then-head of daytime programming, Fred Silverman. Carla's 1979 wedding to Jack was estimated to have been watched by eight million viewers, and landed Holly and Burghardt on the cover of Ebony magazine's October 1979 issue. Jack, however, was always planned to be a short-term character by Holly's design, and was killed off in 1980. During this time, Carla and her mother Sadie found themselves in supporting roles in the storyline involving heroine Edwina Lewis (Margaret Klenck).

At the end of 1980, Carla tearfully begs Ed (who by this time was running for lieutenant governor on the same ticket as Herb Callison, played by Anthony Call) to take her back. Even though he acknowledges that he will always love and care for her, he cannot take her back after her marriage to Jack Scott. Feeling the need to start over, Carla leaves Llanview. She returns in 1983 and, after having attended law school in her absence, Carla becomes an Assistant District Attorney. In this new position, she later has to prosecute Ed on manslaughter charges for a police drug bust gone wrong. Also during this time, she is involved in another love triangle. Carla still has feelings for Ed, but she falls in love and nearly marries a football star-turned-nightclub owner Alec Lowndes (Roger Hill). It takes time for Carla to get over that situation. After Alec is out of the picture, she eventually comes back to Ed.

In September 1985, Carla accepts a job in Arizona similar to what she was doing in Llanview. After wrapping up odds and ends in town, Carla leaves with her mother Sadie and moves to Arizona. By 1987, Ed and their son Josh would also leave town and move to Arizona to be with them. Sadie dies off-screen in the 1990s. Ed returns to Llanview in 2000 after grandson Jared Hall (Herve Clermont) accepts a job practicing law.

== Impact and reception ==
=== Conception and casting ===
"Agnes Nixon is a genius. She isn't just a wonderful writer, she is a genius."

— Ellen Holly on the One Life to Live creator, Archive of American Television

One Life to Live creator Agnes Nixon has said she was inspired to create the Carla Gray character after seeing singer Eartha Kitt in a television interview. Kitt expressed her own frustration at facing prejudice from both white and Black audiences because of her light-skinned complexion, and the feeling of not belonging to either group. (Even Carla's surname "Gray" reflects the in-between nature of the character, not "Black" or "white".)

According to actress Ellen Holly's memoir, One Life: An Autobiography of an African American Actress, Nixon based Carla's mother Sadie on a maid who worked for Nixon's family when she was growing up in Nashville, Tennessee, much the same way that Sadie on One Life initially worked as a maid for the Lord family. Nixon's childhood maid was named Sadie Gay. Lillian Hayman had won a Tony Award in April 1968 for her role as Momma in the musical Hallelujah, Baby!, and immediately afterward, One Life to Live's casting department offered her the role of Sadie Gray.

The character of Carla (despite debuting in episode 61, broadcast on October 7, 1968, months after the show's premiere) was conceptualized in Agnes Nixon's original show Bible, and as such is considered part of the story of Llanview from the beginning. Nixon based Carla and Sadie's original story on the film Imitation of Life, in which a light-skinned Black woman denies her heritage and her darker-complected mother, and enters white society by passing.

Ellen Holly as she appeared early in Carla Gray's storyline.

Ellen Holly was quickly cast in the role of Carla after Agnes Nixon read her op-ed piece which ran in The New York Times on September 15, 1968, called "How Black Do You Have to Be?", in which she decried press coverage of actor Percy Rodriguez allegedly not looking "black enough" to be an acceptable Black addition to the cast of Peyton Place, and detailed her struggles and views as a light-skinned Black actress who could pass for white and chooses not to because she was raised in the Black experience and identifies as Black. A photograph of Holly ran alongside the op-ed with the caption "Ellen Holly — Not black enough?"

Holly was initially hired to appear on One Life to Live for one year. Holly originally had reservations about working on a soap opera, as the bulk of her acting roles up to that point had been in the New York theater scene, but she took the job anyway, believing that her storyline with Lillian Hayman's Sadie Gray was very important and should be told on television, while also not wanting to turn down one year's worth of work and steady pay.

Holly was intrigued by Nixon's idea to examine this mother-daughter relationship, with which Nixon said she had "the luxury of time" in setting the scene and exploring the ideological motivations of each character involved. These "ideological motivation" mini-case studies would manifest themselves in the story not just with Carla and Sadie, but also characters involved in the storyline, such as Anna Wolek, Jim Craig, Price Trainor, and even peripheral characters such as Karen Martin who served as friend to both Carla and Anna. According to Holly, in Imitation of Life, the concept of passing "is never actually examined or illuminated but merely exploited for its surface melodrama", and as a result Holly was excited to see the fresh spin Nixon would bring to this age-old tale.

Holly wrote a follow-up op-ed called "Living a White Life — For a While", which was published in the Times on August 10, 1969; in the op-ed Holly writes at length about her experiences as a lighter-skinned Black actress as well as her experiences after she was cast on One Life to Live. Of note in the 1969 follow-up op-ed is Holly's (and also ABC's) insistence on using the term "Black" on-screen, as opposed to "Negro" which was still considered the correct way to refer to African Americans by many in the U.S. at this time. Holly would go on to write seven more op-eds for The New York Times during her time on One Life to Live.

=== Impact on daytime television ===
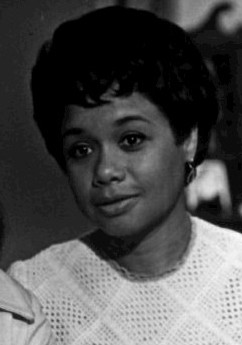
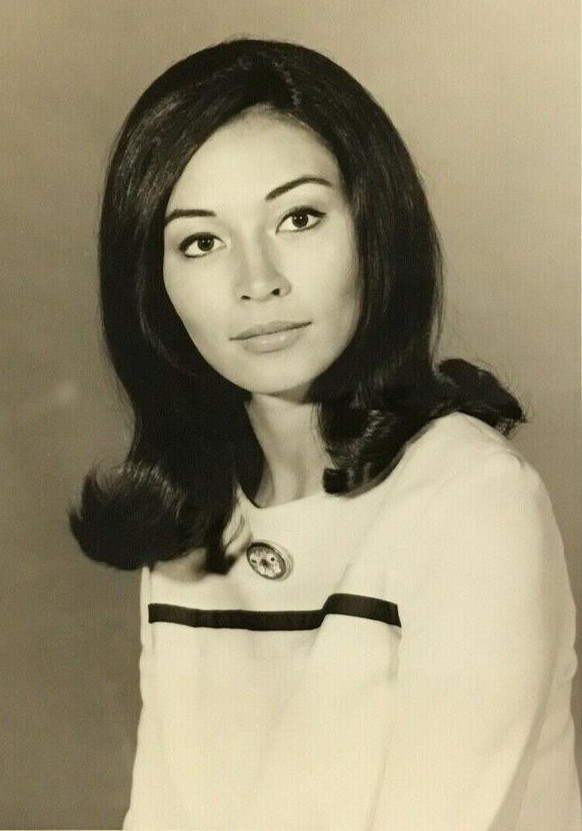
Micki Grant (left) and Nancy Hsueh (right), like Ellen Holly, were pioneers in diversified storytelling on U.S. daytime television. Micki Grant's Another World character, Peggy Nolan, was created by Agnes Nixon.

Before Carla Gray, there had been no African American lead characters on any daytime soap opera. Prior to creating One Life to Live, Agnes Nixon had worked as head writer on the soap operas The Guiding Light and Another World and had attempted to integrate African American characters and actors into these shows, but with limited success. The most enduring of Nixon's first Black characters was recurring character Peggy Nolan, a legal secretary-turned-attorney on Another World played by actress Micki Grant, who would appear on the soap from 1966 until 1973. In 1967, a CBS soap opera, Love Is a Many Splendored Thing, featured an Asian American, actress Nancy Hsueh, as a leading heroine, but the actress and her character Mia Elliott were written out after six months on the air.

ABC as a network was already committed by the late 1960s to broadcasting programming produced by and for African Americans on their five owned-and-operated stations, and the network's vision when One Life to Live was making its debut was to tell stories the other two networks did not. That particular concept — to tell stories other people hadn't told or wouldn't tell — was a hallmark of Agnes Nixon's storytelling. Indeed, when ABC first promoted the series in the trade publication Variety in December 1967, the upcoming One Life to Live was heralded as the serial that would "take daytime out of WASP Valley". One press account went as far as to label it a "Soap Opera About Negroes" simply because multiple Black characters would be appearing on the serial.

In an editorial published in the industry journal Television Quarterly in 1972, Nixon wrote, "For any dramatic entertainment to be a success [in this day and age] it must be relevant...Perhaps the most gratifying aspect of "relevance" is the way it has permitted us to incorporate into our "soaps" many socially significant issues, to educate viewers while we are entertaining them... For almost two years we told the story of a young Negro woman of light pigmentation who passed as white. This sequence was done primarily because it furnished us with an intense, absorbing drama that attracted viewers. But the mail response substantiated our belief that it was absorbing because it was relevant and because it explained to viewers the sociological motivations for such a denial of heritage and race due to the rejections suffered by the young woman from both the black and white communities. The ultimate tragedy we were presenting was simply another instance of man's cruelty to man, instigated by ignorance and prejudice."

As Carla's storyline played out on TV screens in the late 1960s and into the 1970s, viewers were watching the first non-white lead character to be featured in a front-burning, sustained storyline for several years on a soap opera. To that end, One Life to Live became the most-watched daytime soap opera among African Americans, followed closely behind by All My Children, also created by Agnes Nixon, the only other soap opera at the time to focus consistently on providing storylines for Black characters. By the 1980s, it was estimated that 12% of all African American households watched soap operas, twice the rate of white households, for which actress Ellen Holly was given partial credit. (In fact it was Nixon's sister soap All My Children that debuted daytime's second Black leading female character, Nancy Grant, played by Lisa Wilkinson, who arrived in Pine Valley in 1973 as the wife of John Danelle's character Frank Grant and stayed on the canvas for 11 years. Black publications such as Jet featured the two actors, who were married in real life, in cover stories.)

"Who else could better empathize with Nixon's challenges in writing from Carla's perspective (Ms. Holly even wrote some parts of the script!)? Who else could appear white enough on a Friday to outrage fans that had watched her kiss a black character, yet black enough on the following Monday to outrage the same rapt bigots who are suddenly "offended" at the memory of her romantic relationship with a white character? And of course, who else had a theater resume that was as strong as hers, that could "justify" creation of the new role (instead of another white character) and then go on to succeed as the first black lead in daytime?"

— Kevin Mulcahy, Jr. of the industry blog We Love Soaps, who interviewed Ellen Holly in 2012.

Throughout her fourteen-and-a-half years on the program, Holly was given varying degrees of autonomy in the sculpting of the character of Carla and the storylines in which she would be involved. Holly's input was solicited at first because there were no Black writers on the One Life to Live writing staff; head writer Sam Hall eventually convinced ABC to hire a Black writer because he wanted to lend more authenticity to Carla's storyline.

Ellen Holly's primary role on One Life to Live paved the way for more Black actors and actresses to be given prominent storylines on other daytime soaps. In 1968, the year Holly debuted on One Life to Live, only three Black actors were featured in a recurring status or higher on U.S. daytime soap operas; that number would increase to 25 by 1982, with Al Freeman, Jr., who played Carla's husband Ed Hall, becoming the first Black man to win a Daytime Emmy Award in a leading category in 1979.

When asked about the cultural impact of Black storylines which aired on One Life to Live, Holly said in a 1979 interview with Ebony magazine, "There are enormous stretches in this country where they don't know anything about Black people...Our viewers tend to regard us as neighbors. People at the supermarket, total strangers, will throw their arms around you and treat you as a neighbor...My mother on the show has been a domestic and is now head of the housekeeping staff at the hospital; my ex-husband on the show is a policeman, and Arthur [Burghardt] plays a brilliant heart surgeon...I think we've opened up our viewers' heads a little bit more to the variety that exists in the Black race. And the more that happens, the slower somebody will be — when they're confronted with any given Black person — to jump to conclusions about who and what that person is."

=== Wedding of Ed and Carla Hall ===
Ed Hall and Carla Gray were initially supposed to marry in the summer of 1973. However, several news breaks chronicling the Watergate scandal were preempting daytime television. This forced One Life to Live to push the wedding into the fall. In its place the story of Lester Brock attempting to kill Carla on numerous occasions would test Carla and Ed's commitment to each other for a final time before they were to marry.

Famous pianist and jazz singer Hazel Scott made a deal with the show's head-writers to make an appearance on OLTL as well. She would play a famous aunt of Carla's who would sing a song to the newlyweds. Hazel Scott wrote the song herself and appeared in the October 3 and 4 episodes of 1973, in which Carla and Ed were to marry. The marriage ceremony itself was broadcast on October 5, 1973. The wedding was also the first on-screen wedding of two African American characters on a U.S. daytime soap.

In 2020, Candace Young and Charlie Mason from Soaps She Knows put Ed and Carla on their list of Daytime's Most Important African-American Characters, commenting "A lightning rod of a character, Ellen Holly's alter ego shocked viewers when she started dating a Black man, then shocked them again when it was revealed that she, too, was Black. Eventually, she settled down with the beloved Llanview PD detective who was played by daytime's first Black Outstanding Lead Actor Emmy winner, Al Freeman Jr."

=== Holly leaves One Life to Live for the first time ===
Unfortunately, Holly depicts a backstage story that diverges far from the ideal storyline shown on air. She claims that despite Carla Gray's storylines being major reasons for the series' early success (with One Life to Live having the highest number of non-white viewers), she faced racist attitudes behind the camera. These included being paid less than white actresses on the program (Holly was initially paid $300 per week as outlined in her 1968-69 contract, rising to only $325 per week in 1969-70 and $350 per week in 1970–71); returning from the funeral of her nephew who died of glioblastoma only to find that in the elapsed time, her dressing room was given away to a white actress; and discriminatory treatment while taking part in a feature and photoshoot on the history of One Life to Live for Daytime TV magazine which Lillian Hayman was not present for as she was not invited to take part, despite being a main cast member at the time.

Holly became very attached to One Life to Live's first producer, Doris Quinlan, and was emotionally impacted when she left the program in 1977, so much so that Holly and Al Freeman, Jr. wrote a letter to ABC executives on behalf of the show's cast which attempted to lobby to keep Quinlan's job safe, but the duo were unsuccessful in their efforts. Holly would later learn that Quinlan being replaced by Joseph Stuart was agreed upon by many higher-ups in the program's hierarchy, including Agnes Nixon, who considered both producers her protégés. Quinlan's successor Stuart was tougher in critiquing Holly's acting than Quinlan had been. This was partly due to Holly's letter to ABC executives, which Stuart knew about and saw as a direct personal attack.

Holly also took umbrage with Stuart's handling of the love triangle storyline she devised, particularly the hiring of Arthur Burghardt as she explicitly voiced her disapproval over the planned casting choice and even had another actor in mind to play the role of Dr. Jack Scott, who Stuart rejected after allowing Holly's preferred actor to audition. Finally, Holly took issue with the prominence of Erika Slezak's character Victoria "Viki" Riley in Carla's 1979 wedding storyline; Holly alleged that Slezak thought her participation as matron-of-honor in Carla's wedding was an attempt to "give luster" to the storyline. Holly also alleged that the character of Viki Riley was placed into the storyline in an attempt to endear Viki more to the African American viewership demographic. In the same interview series, when asked about this specific situation, Slezak briefly complimented Holly's ability as an actress and said that she was "strong-willed" and "intelligent".

A combination of all the aforementioned examples contributed to Holly's decision to step away from One Life to Live in December 1980. In a 2013 interview, Holly said of her decision to leave, "I fled the show because my health was literally going down the tubes. The first two years of One Life were thrilling. After that, it's just a question of being a fireplug that keeps getting pissed on by junkyard dogs." Holly decided to start a theater workshop with the ultimate goal of producing Broadway and Off-Broadway plays with Joseph Papp.

Joseph Stuart's eventual replacement, Jean Arley, was interested in bringing Carla back into the canvas in Llanview. Holly's friend, casting director Mary Jo Slater, informed Holly that Agnes Nixon had moved Stuart over to Loving, her new soap opera, to be its producer. Once Slater arranged a lunch where Arley had the chance to meet Holly, Holly felt immediately at ease. Jean Arley would bring Holly and the character of Carla back into the show in the spring of 1983. Holly insisted on a salary of $150,000 per year, twice the amount she made when she left in 1980, despite knowing that other actors on the program were making more than $1 million at that time. Even though ABC originally tried to negotiate, the network paid Holly the amount she asked for.

=== Treatment of Holly and Carla under Paul Rauch ===
A fifteenth anniversary celebration event was held in honor of One Life to Live at New York City's Tavern on the Green in the second half of 1983, and Holly and Lillian Hayman were front-and-center at the festivities as the two actors had played some of Nixon's original One Life to Live characters. Holly posits that, as a result of their primary role in the celebration while newer and perhaps more popular actors were sidelined, ABC fired Jean Arley, the producer who brought her back to One Life to Live after a two-and-a-half-year absence and the person who organized the event, and replaced her with Paul Rauch. In her book, Holly is vocal about her frustration at her character being pushed into the background to make way for new white characters, and about being summarily dismissed in 1985 by Rauch, who by that time had become executive producer and writing consultant. Rauch fired every Black lead or recurring character on the show during his 1984-91 tenure. (Rauch's eventual successor, Linda Gottlieb, reintroduced Black characters into One Life to Live within six months of her July 1991 arrival.)

In a 2018 interview with the Television Academy Foundation, Holly said she had a feeling she would be fired from One Life to Live when new executive producer Rauch reprimanded Holly publicly for her choice of hairstyle in front of the crew and other actors, alleging that shoulder-length hair was "unprofessional" for an Assistant District Attorney. This dressing-down, in front of crew and actors, was something that had never happened to Holly while working on the program before. Joseph Stuart had given Holly tough critiques toward the end of her first stint playing Carla, but those critiques always occurred privately, behind closed doors. She also intuited that storyline options for the character of Carla promised to her by Arley, like one that would have involved Carla adopting children and raising them as a single mother, would not be going forward.

According to Holly, Rauch would publicly reprimand her for the slightest infractions, or even perceived infractions. In one instance, Rauch ordered Holly take voice lessons because her voice was "an offense to the public that should be taken off the air." After Holly consulted a voice coach who was similarly puzzled by Rauch's request to change Holly's voice, Rauch informed Holly that he "couldn't quite put [his] finger" on why he disliked her voice. Holly believed that Rauch's pivot from material infractions to perceived infractions was his way of breaking her spirit, as Holly immediately changed her hairstyle upon her first reprimand, but could not change her voice as she received no constructive feedback with which she could work.

Holly was eventually fired by Rauch in late 1985:

[When] my contract was almost over...7 a.m., this is how sadistic he was. He could have told me this at the end of the day. 7 a.m., he calls me out of makeup, I'm looking like the Bride of Frankenstein, with my hair all up in curlers...and I sit down in the chair, and he says, "When your contract's up, we're dropping you. You're just not worth keeping," and it's always a blow, but when I thought I could stand up and keep straight, I stood up. It took me a moment for me to be sure I wasn't going to fall down. I said, "I see. Thank you!" and I left. I wasn't about to give a sadist an orgasm by begging for my job!

— Ellen Holly

== See also ==
- One Life to Live storylines (1968–1979)

== Bibliography ==
- Warner, Gary. One Life to Live: Thirty Years of Memories. Hyperion Books (ISBN 0786863676)
- Holly, Ellen. One Life: An Autobiography of an African American Actress. Kodansha America, 1998 (ISBN 1568361971)
