= Sadie Gray =

- One Life to Live character
- Portrayed by: Lillian Hayman (1968–86); Esther Rolle (1970–71); Hilda Haynes
- Duration: 1968–86
- First appearance: July 19, 1968
- Last appearance: December 1986
- Created by: Agnes Nixon
- Introduced by: Doris Quinlan; Joseph Stuart (1978)
- Crossover appearances: All My Children
In-universe information
- Other names: Sadie Scott (maiden name)
- Occupation: Maid; Singer; Hospital administrator
- Sisters: Hazel Scott
- Daughters: Carla Gray
- Grandsons: Josh Hall (adoptive)
- Other relatives: Jared Hall (adoptive)

Sadie Gray is a fictional character from the American soap opera One Life to Live, played by Broadway actress and singer Lillian Hayman from 1968 to 1986. Sadie regularly sings at special functions and occasions during her appearance on the serial.

== Background and casting ==
One Life to Live creator Agnes Nixon cast Lillian Hayman in the supporting role of "Sadie" in the 5th episode of the soap. Nixon named the role after her actual family housekeeper, Sadie Gay, and based the character's founding plotline on the 1959 film Imitation of Life.

Hayman played the character role for 18 years until 1986, when the show executive producer Paul Rauch declined to renew her contract with ABC Daytime at a time when she was the longest-tenured actor with the show, following the firing of her onscreen daughter Ellen Holly (Carla Gray).

Esther Rolle, who would later become recognized for her Golden Globe Award-nominated role as Florida Evans on the CBS prime time sitcom Good Times, temporarily played the role in 1971 when Hayman took a part in the Broadway musical 70, Girls, 70.

== Storyline ==
Sadie is introduced in July 1968 as the former Lord's family maid at their manor house, Llanfair. She eventually quit her job there to become the head of housekeeping at Llanview Hospital. She lives across the hall from her good friend Anna Wolek (Doris Belack). Sadie is a widow and mentions her "lost" and absent daughter Carla Gray.

A mystery woman named Carla Benari (Ellen Holly) shows up in town in October 1968, introduced as an Italian American woman who becomes the secretary to Llanview Hospital chief of staff and doctor Jim Craig (Robert Milli). She dates African American resident physician Price Trainor (Peter DeAnda), and many hospital staffers are shocked at the prospect of a white American woman dating a black man. A few months later, it is revealed that "Clara Benari" is the assumed name of Carla Gray, Sadie's lighter-skinned black daughter passing as white. Sadie is furious that her daughter would deny her heritage, but they eventually reconcile, and Carla embraces her roots and reclaims her surname "Gray."

She takes a job as a family housekeeper to Llanview Hospital psychiatrist Will Vernon (Anthony George) in 1977, and moves in with the family in 1978 after Will's daughter Samantha Vernon (Julia Montgomery) is involved in a car accident. Sadie is depressed when her daughter Carla and her husband Ed Hall (Al Freeman Jr.) divorce in 1979, but she sets her feelings aside and sings at the wedding of Carla's new love interest, Jack Scott (Arthur Burghardt), in October.

Hayman's airtime as "Sadie" increased after a period of intermittent appearances in the early 1980s when Carla returned to appear regularly in fictional Llanview in 1983 after a three-year absence. Sadie encourages Carla to rekindle her relationship with Ed, to no avail. Carla accepts a job practicing law in Arizona and disappears from the show in 1985. Sadie's appearances declined after September 1985, and eventually disappeared from the show in 1986. Her former son-in-law and former Llanview police commissioner Ed said during an appearance in 2000 that Sadie died in the 1990s.
