= Hallelujah, Baby! =

Musical

- Original cast recording
- Music: Jule Styne
- Lyrics: Adolph Green; Betty Comden
- Book: Arthur Laurents
- Productions: 1967 Broadway; 2004 Arena Stage; George Street Playhouse
- Awards: Tony Award for Best Musical; Tony Award for Best Score

Hallelujah, Baby! is a musical with music by Jule Styne, lyrics by Adolph Green and Betty Comden, and a book by Arthur Laurents. The show is "a chronicle of the African American struggle for equality during the [first half of the] 20th century."

The musical premiered on Broadway in 1967 and made a young Leslie Uggams a star. It won the Tony Award for Best Musical. In 2004, Laurents restaged the show twice with the same cast, in Washington D.C at the Arena Stage and at the George Street Playhouse in New Jersey, in order to update and streamline the story for modern sensibilities, and potentially move to New York for a full revival. The score was updated by Adolph Green's daughter, Amanda Green. Critics noted that although the score and performances were entertaining and had its merits, the book was still too outdated.

== Synopsis ==
Georgina is a talented, beautiful and ambitious African American woman, determined to have a career. Overcoming many obstacles, she rises to stardom. She makes her way through the Great Depression, World War II, and the beginning of the civil rights movement. Her mother advises her to "keep her place" as a maid on a South Carolina estate, but Georgina negotiates the blocks to stardom from her negative and opportunistic mother. She encounters the racism that pervades society and show business.

Two men vie for Georgina's attention. Harvey, who is white, is able to provide opportunities for her. Her fiancé, Clem, who is a black train porter, cannot help her on her journey. By the 1950s, she is a successful singer in an expensive night club. However, Clem, who became an Army captain and then a civil rights activist, challenges Georgina's life goals.

== Original cast and characters ==
Character	Broadway (1967)	Summer Stock Tour (1968)	Arena Stage (2004)	Off-Broadway (2018)
Georgina	Leslie Uggams	Diana Sands	Suzzanne Douglas	Stephanie Umoh
Momma	Lillian Hayman	Rosetta LeNoire	Ann Duquesnay	Vivian Reed
Clem	Robert Hooks	Leon Bibb	Curtiss Cook	Jarran Muse
Mary	Barbara Sharma	Connie Danese	Laurie Gamache	Jennifer Cody
Harvey	Allen Case	Larry Keith	Stephen Zinnato	Tally Sessions
Mr. Charles / Timmy	Frank Hamilton	N/A	N/A	N/A
Mrs. Charles / Ethel	Marilyn Cooper	Betsy Langman	N/A	N/A
Tip	Winston DeWitt Hemsley	Bernard Johnson	Randy Donaldson	Bernard Dotson
Tap	Alan Weeks	Mabel Robinson	Gerry McIntyre	Randy Donaldson

== Musical numbers ==
Act 1

- Prologue - Georgina
- Back in the Kitchen - Momma
- My Own Morning - Georgina
- The Slice - Clem and Provers
- Farewell, Farewell - Calhoun, Betty Loo, Captain Yankee, Georgina, and Harvey
- When the Weather's Better - Clem
- Feet Do Yo' Stuff - Georgina, Chorines, Tip, and Tap
- Watch My Dust - Clem
- Smile, Smile - Clem, Georgina, and Momma
- Witches' Brew - Georgina, Mary, Ethel, and Company
- Breadline Dance - Bums
- Another Day - Harvey, Clem, Mary, and Georgina
- I Wanted to Change Him - Georgina
- Being Good Isn't Good Enough - Georgina

Act 2

- Dance Drill - Tip, Tap and G.I.s
- Talking to Yourself - Georgina, Clem, and Harvey
- Limbo Dance - Night Club Patrons
- Hallelujah Baby! - Georgina, Tip, and Tap
- Not Mine - Harvey
- I Don't Know Where She Got It - Momma, Clem, and Harvey
- Now's the Time - Georgina
- Now's the Time (Reprise) - Company

"Witches Brew" had a tune that was recycled from "Call Me Savage," a song from a prior musical Fade Out – Fade In and was originally sung by Carol Burnett.

== Productions ==
The musical opened on Broadway at the Martin Beck Theatre on April 26, 1967, and closed on January 13, 1968, after 293 performances and 22 previews. It was directed by Burt Shevelove, choreographed by Kevin Carlisle, musical direction by Buster Davis, orchestrations by Peter Matz, with scenic design by William and Jean Eckart, costumes by Irene Sharaff and lighting by Tharon Musser. The production won five Tony Awards (out of nine nominations), including Best Musical, and Uggams and Hayman won the Tonys for Best Actress and Best Featured Actress, respectively, for their performances. This remains the only show to win the Tony for Best Musical after it closed.

The New York City Center originally announced an off-Broadway production as a part of its 2027 Encores! concert series. However, on September 23, the production was replaced with Let 'Em Eat Cake, with City Center saying they were holding off to allow for more creative development on Hallelujah, Baby! in a future season.

== Laurents' recollections ==
Arthur Laurents felt that "the original production was too soft in its take on black social progress during the first six decades or so of the twentieth century. It was originally written with Lena Horne in mind. When the steely Horne opted out of the project, it was rewritten to suit the more youthful and bubbly Leslie Uggams." In the 2004 production, Laurents attempted "to add levels of darker intensity.... However, the music and lyrics are in the infectiously bright and bubbly style of musical comedy, and his efforts in this area reduce the charm and good spirits of the show without adding much of significance in the way of depth or insight." According to Laurents, after Lena Horne declined to do the show, "What we should have done is abandon the show.... Instead it was rewriten for a woman who is one of the nicest women I have ever met in the theatre, Leslie Uggams,--and, God knows, she has a beautiful voice ... she was good, but it wasn't that original show. The show lost its edge, and I must say I lost interest in it."

== Awards and nominations ==
=== Original Broadway production ===
Year	Award	Category	Nominee	Result
1967	Theatre World Award		Leslie Uggams	Won
1968	Tony Award	Best Musical		Won
1968	Tony Award	Best Original Score	Jule Styne, Adolph Green and Betty Comden	Won
1968	Tony Award	Best Performance by a Leading Actor in a Musical	Robert Hooks	Nominated
1968	Tony Award	Best Performance by a Leading Actress in a Musical	Leslie Uggams	Won
1968	Tony Award	Best Performance by a Featured Actress in a Musical	Lillian Hayman	Won
1968	Tony Award	Best Direction of a Musical	Burt Shevelove	Nominated
1968	Tony Award	Best Choreography	Kevin Carlisle	Nominated
1968	Tony Award	Best Producer of a Musical	Albert W. Selden, Hal James, Jane C. Nussbaum and Harry Rigby	Won
1968	Tony Award	Best Costume Design	Irene Sharaff	Nominated

=== Washington D.C production ===
Year	Award	Category	Recipient	Result	Ref.
2005	Helen Hayes Awards	Outstanding Supporting Actress, Resident Musical	Ann Duquesnay	Won	
2005	Helen Hayes Awards	Outstanding Lead Actress, Resident Musical	Suzzanne Douglas	Nominated	
