= List of All My Children characters introduced in the 1970s =

A list of notable characters from the ABC soap opera All My Children who significantly impacted storylines and began their run from the years 1970 to 1979.

== Phoebe Tyler ==
Phoebe Tyler
- All My Children character
- Portrayed by: Ruth Warrick
- Duration: 1970–2005
- First appearance: January 5, 1970
- Last appearance: January 5, 2005
- Created by: Agnes Nixon
In-universe information
- Other names: Phoebe Wallingford
- Occupation: Socialite; Member of the Daughters of Fine Lineage; Member of the Pine Valley Historical Society; Overseer of fundraising efforts for the AIDS Hospice/Cindy Chandler Memorial; Columnist for Tempo magazine (She's Dear Aggy, the advice columnist)
- Brothers: Ed English
- Spouse: Charles Tyler (1936–79); Langley Wallingford (1982–86, 1987–200?); Wade Matthews (1986–87)
- Children: Lincoln Tyler; Anne Tyler
- Grandchildren: Beth Martin
- Nieces: Brooke English
- Other relatives: Laura Kirk English (adoptive); Laura Cudahy; Jamie Martin

Phoebe Wallingford was portrayed by Ruth Warrick from 1970 until her death in 2005. Warrick was nominated twice for Emmy Awards, and received the Daytime Emmy Award for lifetime achievement for her portrayal of the character.

Phoebe was a pillar of Pine Valley. Her family, the Englishes, were founders of the region. The leading socialite in the community, Phoebe prides herself on her family's ancestry, and is a member of the fictional "Daughters of Fine Lineage."

Phoebe is first married to Charles Tyler, Chief of Staff at Pine Valley Hospital. They have three children, Charles Jr. (Charles' son by his first wife, and thus, Phoebe's stepson at the time), Lincoln, and Anne. Charles Jr. and his wife are killed in a car wreck, leaving Phoebe and Charles to raise their grandson, Chuck. Chuck gives his grandmother plenty of grief with his involvement in one of the show's earliest love triangles between himself, his best friend Philip Brent, and the young Tara Martin. Lincoln becomes a prominent attorney and is first married to Amy Parker. After Amy's secret child from a prior relationship is eventually found out, she leaves Lincoln and Pine Valley.

Chuck later marries Donna Beck, a reformed prostitute whom Phoebe detests, calling her "that Donna creature;" and Carrie Sanders, whose father had been abusive to both his wives. He dates several other women in Pine Valley. He is the natural father of Donna's son Palmer John, conceived in an affair while she is married to Phoebe's friend, Palmer Cortlandt. Phoebe and Chuck have a very close bond throughout the show, and she considers him more of a son than a grandson.

Phoebe's son Lincoln is married to a set of twins, Kitty Shea Davis and Kelly Cole. Anne is married at first to a European nobleman, then to Nick Davis (the father of Amy's son), and, finally, to the attorney Paul Martin (who is involved with other women during the time of Ann's institutionalization).

Phoebe constantly meddles in the lives of her children and niece, much to the dismay of her husband Charles. Despite this, though, she always meant well. Charles, much more down-to-earth than his often snobby and overbearing wife, later turns to his secretary, Mona Kane, for comfort. This pushes Phoebe to begin drinking heavily, often making a spectacle of herself at public events. Her fondness for alcohol once led to a drunk driving arrest, as well as a drunken tumble down her staircase.

Phoebe and Charles eventually divorce, and she finds a new love in the form of Langley Wallingford. Langley claims to be a professor, but he has a checkered past as a con artist. He initially pursues Phoebe for her fortune, but eventually falls in love with her. Langley and Phoebe marry in June 1980. Their marriage is briefly strained in 1984 when Phoebe learns of her husband's past, but the two reconcile. They are blissfully happy until the arrival of another poser named Wade Matthews in 1986. Wade stages a series of events to break up Langley and Phoebe. Phoebe marries the much younger Wade in a drunken stupor. Wade unsuccessfully tries to murder Phoebe to inherit a sizable portion of her estate. He is later found out and imprisoned, and the marriage is annulled. Phoebe and Langley remarry and remain together until the latter's death in the early 2000s. Phoebe dies from natural causes in May 2005, with her niece, Brooke English, at her side. Her last words were "Langley is waiting for me."

== Ruth Martin ==
Ruth Martin
- All My Children character
- Portrayed by: Mary Fickett (1970–96, 2000); Lee Meriwether (1996–99, 2002–03, 2007–11)
- Duration: 1970–2000, 2002–03, 2007–11
- First appearance: January 5, 1970
- Last appearance: September 23, 2011
- Created by: Agnes Nixon
In-universe information
- Occupation: Registered nurse
- Sisters: Amy Parker
- Spouse: Ted Brent (pre-1970); Joe Martin (1972–)
- Children: Jake Martin
- Adoptive children: Phil Brent; Tad Martin
- Stepchildren: Jeff Martin; Tara Martin; Bobby Martin
- Grandchildren: Charlie Brent (adoptive); Jamie Martin (adoptive); Damon Miller (adoptive); Kathy Martin (adoptive); Jenny Martin (adoptive); Trevor Martin
- Nephews: Phil Brent
- Other relatives: Charlie Brent

Ruth Martin (also Parker and Brent) was portrayed by Mary Fickett and Lee Meriwether. Ruth is a registered nurse and volunteer for Habitat for Humanity. In the 1970s, she is raped by Ray Gardner, the biological father of her adopted son, Tad Martin. Ruth is the matriarch of the Martin family and, in a sense, the matriarchial character of All My Children itself. Along with her husband Joe Martin and her former stepdaughter-in-law Erica Kane, she is one of three original characters remaining since the series' premiere episode. The character was originated by Fickett in the show's first episode on January 5, 1970. After 26 years, Fickett left the role, only briefly returning for the year of 2000, and Ruth has been portrayed by Meriwether since July 10, 1996, for various stints until 2011 series finale.

Ruth is married to Ted Brent in 1970 when All My Children begins. She is a registered nurse at Pine Valley Hospital. Ruth and Ted have an adopted son named Philip Brent. Philip is actually Ruth's nephew, the son of Amy Tyler (Ruth's sister) and Nick Davis. Ruth is adamant about keeping Phillip's true paternity from him, but Nick Davis threatens to reveal the truth. After her first husband Ted Brent dies in a car accident, she begins dating her colleague Dr. Joe Martin, a widower. The two married in 1972, blending their families. The Martins take in a young boy Thaddeus Gardner in 1973. Thaddeus (known as Tad) was abandoned by his abusive father, Ray Gardner, in a park. Ray shows up sometime later and demands money for his son. After the Martins adamantly refuse, Ray stalks Ruth and violently rapes her one night, leaving her in a coma.

In 1975, Joe begins to have feelings for a patient he is treating named Leora Sanders. During their separation, Ruth has an affair with David Thorton and the two become engaged at one point. Eventually, she and Joe reconcile. They conceive a son, Joseph Martin Jr. (now referred to as Jake), on Christmas Day 1979. Ruth and the entire Martin family grieve the loss of Kate Martin, Joe's mother, in 1985. In 1994, the Martin House is destroyed by a tornado. Tad is severely injured and almost dies. The whole town comes together and helps the Martins rebuild their house. In 1997, Joe suffers a heart attack and almost dies. Ruth is there to nurture Joe back to health. Throughout most of the 1990s and 2000s, Ruth becomes more of a supporting character and is only seen on holidays and special occasions. She often appears to support her sons Tad and Jake, and her grandson Charlie Brent. She maintains friendships with characters such as Mona Kane Tyler, Opal Cortlandt, and Marian Colby Chandler over the years. In the 1990s, she trains Julia Santos in Pine Valley Hospital's nursing program. In April 2008, she is confronted with a reminder of her rape, when Ray Gardner's brother, Robert, comes to her granddaughter Jenny's birthday party. In May 2008, Ruth and Joe attend Jesse and Angie Hubbard's wedding; Robert Gardner shows up and shoots Julia, Greg, and Tad. Ruth and Joe attempt to save Julia, but she dies as a result of her injuries. The Martins are devastated over Julia's death, but are thrilled to find out that Julia's foster child, Kathy Mershon, is actually their long lost granddaughter, Tad's daughter Kathy Martin.

After Stuart Chandler's murder in May 2009, Ruth, Tad, Jake, and Amanda attend his funeral. On December 3, 2009, Joe announces to Jake that he and Ruth are making plans to retire and are thinking of moving. This comes as a complete surprise to Jake, but Joe assures him that he and Ruth will always miss Pine Valley, but it is time for a change. In January 2010, Ruth and Joe retired and moved to Florida where Tara and Kelsey live. In April 2010, Ruth and Joe are devastated to hear that their dear friend Palmer Cortlandt died. At midnight, they along with other Pine Valley residents of past and present, light candles to honor him. Ruth briefly returns in June 2010 for her son Jake's vow renewal ceremony to Amanda Dillon.

All My Children broke new ground and made history in 1971 when they had Ruth publicly protest the Vietnam War. This is a television first, and in 1973, Mary Fickett became the first daytime television performer in television history to receive an Emmy Award for this storyline.

In 1996, Mary Fickett decided to retire from acting. She allowed her contract with All My Children to expire, expecting to be offered a recurring status (meaning she could appear occasionally, without a minimum number of required appearances). Fans and soap opera publications were shocked when ABC announced that they recast the role with former Miss America winner Lee Meriwether that same year. This came as a shock, as Fickett was an original cast member who had played Ruth for 26 years. However, in 1999, negotiations between Meriwether's agents and the producers of All My Children broke down, and Meriwether was let go. In 2000, ABC asked Mary Fickett back to portray Ruth for the show's 30th-anniversary episode. Fickett continued to play Ruth throughout most of 2000, but decided to permanently retire at the end of that year. Ruth did not appear on the show again for an entire year.

In 2002, the show's writers wanted to bring the character back to the canvas. ABC asked Lee Meriwether back to the show, as Mary Fickett declined an offer to stay with the show on a recurring basis. Meriwether portrayed Ruth from that point on. On September 8, 2011, Fickett died at age 83. All My Children was planned a special tribute to her in an episode that aired two days before the series finale.

== Mona Kane ==
Mona Kane
- All My Children character
- Portrayed by: Frances Heflin
- Duration: 1970–94
- First appearance: 1970
- Last appearance: 1994
- Created by: Agnes Nixon
In-universe information
- Occupation: Administrative Assistant
- Husband: Eric Kane (divorced); Charles Tyler (1980–86)
- Daughters: Erica Kane
- Grandchildren: Kendall Hart; Josh Madden; Bianca Montgomery
- Other relatives: Miranda Montgomery; Spike Lavery; Ian Slater; Gabrielle Montgomery

Mona Kane Tyler, also called Mona Kane, was an original fictional character on the long-running American daytime drama All My Children. Mona was portrayed by Frances Heflin from the first episode in 1970 to the actress' death in 1994.

Mona was the hard-working mother of Erica Kane (Susan Lucci) and secretary to Dr. Charles Tyler (Hugh Franklin), whom she later married. Her relationship with Charles caused a big rift between her and the intrusive Phoebe Tyler (Ruth Warrick), Charles' wife before her. Mona always defended Erica, who always made questionable choices where her life was concerned. Mona's role on the program was primarily to offer level-headed advice to many characters, but most often to her daughter Erica. She was also best friends with Myrtle Fargate and doted upon her granddaughters, Kendall and Bianca. In fact, Bianca had gained her sweetness from her grandmother.

In 1992, Mona was diagnosed with lung cancer, as actress Frances Heflin was diagnosed with the same ailment in real life. While Mona successfully beat lung cancer, portrayer Heflin did not. Heflin died in 1994 and afterward Mona was written out of the show. Mona died in her sleep, and, in a scene forever remembered in Pine Valley, Erica broke down and threw herself on her mother's coffin before it was to be laid into the ground.

== Franklin "Frank" Grant ==
Frank Grant
- All My Children character
- John Danelle as Frank Grant, 1982
- Portrayed by: Don Blakely (1972); John Danelle (1972–82)
- Duration: 1972–82
- First appearance: 1972
- Last appearance: 1982
- Created by: Agnes Nixon
- Introduced by: Agnes Nixon and Bud Kloss
In-universe information
- Occupation: Doctor; Former soldier
- Sisters: Eleanor "Ellie" Grant Hubbard
- Wife: Nancy Grant (until 1977, 1980–82); Caroline Murray (1977–79)
- Sons: Carl Blair Jr.
- Nephews: Jesse Hubbard

Franklin "Frank" Grant is a fictional character from the American daytime drama All My Children; he is noted for being the first Black primary character on the soap opera. Don Blakely originated the role in 1972, being replaced later that year by the actor most identified with the role, John Danelle, who would portray the character until November 1982.

Frank comes from a place called Center City, (Note: Like Pine Valley, Center City is a fictional Pennsylvania municipality on All My Children. It is not to be confused with the downtown section of Philadelphia, which is also referred to as Center City.) within driving distance of Pine Valley, and he grew up with limited opportunities. He became a doctor after serving in the United States Army, who paid for his medical schooling. He arrives as a new doctor in residence in 1972 and is paired on rounds with Dr. Jeff Martin. Frank and Jeff become best friends and their friendship endures throughout the time Frank is on the canvas in Pine Valley. Frank's wife Nancy, a successful social worker, often travels to Chicago for work for months at a time. Frank is always hopeful that Nancy will settle in Pine Valley just as he chose to do, but career-minded Nancy chooses work almost every time.

During Nancy's time away from Pine Valley, Frank mentors a new doctor, Chuck Tyler, and becomes involved in the initial intrigue surrounding Donna Beck, a teenage runaway and prostitute who arrives in Pine Valley Hospital badly beaten. Chuck takes Donna under his wing, in some situations perhaps to his own detriment. Frank thinks it would be easier for Chuck to cut ties with Donna for good, but softens his stance once he sees that Chuck and Donna are in love. Donna becomes fast friends with Caroline Murray, a nurse Frank treated for flashbacks to her time in Vietnam. Caroline and Frank's connection begins to form while Nancy is away, even though Frank is careful to keep things platonic out of respect for Nancy. Nancy, who is very jealous, suspects the worst anyway, and eventually Caroline's presence plus the near-constant physical distance ended Frank and Nancy's marriage.

Frank moves on with Caroline and they marry, but not before Nancy reappears in Pine Valley and they make love once. Nancy learns she is pregnant with Frank's baby and tells nobody except the man she plans to marry, Carl Blair, who will raise her son as his own. Carl dies hours after marrying Nancy in the hospital, revealing to Caroline that Frank was really Carl Jr.'s father. Frank will be in the dark about Carl Jr.'s paternity until March 1979. At that time, Frank began to show signs of jealousy because Nancy begins a relationship with his doctor colleague Dr. Russell "Russ" Anderson. Both Nancy and Caroline pick up on this jealousy, leading to fights between Frank and both women on separate occasions. Nancy reveals that Caroline knows that Frank is Carl Jr.'s father; furious, Frank immediately files for divorce and refuses to see Caroline.

Frank saves Nancy after she is brutally mugged and left for dead; her social work had called her to an unsafe neighborhood where the crime took place. As a gesture of thanks, Nancy allows unsupervised visits between Frank and Carl Jr., which she immediately regrets when Carl Jr. suffers a spinal injury after a fall at a local playground. Frank, who had brought Carl Jr. to the playground with his new girlfriend Betsy Kennicott, was paying more attention to Betsy than to the child, causing the accident to occur. Frank overhears Nancy tell Russ that she plans on not allowing Frank to adopt Carl Jr., despite being his biological child, because Carl Jr. already has a father, Nancy reasoned: Carl Blair Sr., Nancy's deceased husband, is listed as his father on the birth certificate. Frank is furious and this eavesdropped revelation sets off a chain of arguments between Frank and Nancy, after which Frank decides to focus on winning Nancy back for good. Nancy, for her part, fights Frank every step of the way and convinces herself that she loves Russ. The night before her wedding, Nancy appears on Frank's doorstep and tells him that she loves him. They remarry on Thanksgiving Day 1980. After marrying Frank, Nancy relents on the issue of adoption, and Frank legally adopts Carl Jr.

In mid-1981, Frank's 17-year-old nephew Jesse Hubbard moves to Pine Valley after the death of Jesse's only surviving parent, Frank's sister Ellie. Shortly after arriving, Frank and Nancy's house almost burned down after a cigarette of Jesse's started a blaze. Frank champions Jesse as he sees a lot of himself in Jesse and realizes Jesse's full potential in life, and he and Nancy take it upon themselves to help Jesse see that potential.

Frank introduces Jesse to Angela "Angie" Baxter in 1982, when she volunteers as a candy striper at Pine Valley Hospital. Angie's father Les, an upper-middle-class attorney, doesn't think Jesse is good enough for his daughter. Later that year, Frank and Les get into a heated argument after Les forced Nancy out of his home earlier in the day. During the argument, in which they argue over Jesse and Angie, Frank suffers a stroke and collapses. Despite Les's wife Pat immediately sending for an ambulance, the stroke completely paralyzes Frank. Nancy and Jesse visit with Frank in the hospital before his heart monitor goes flat. Jesse's last words to Frank, who in the hospital could only blink as acknowledgement, were "I'm gonna make you proud of me, but what I want you to know more than anything else is that I love you."

== Caroline Murray ==
Caroline Murray
- All My Children character
- Portrayed by: Patricia Dixon
- Duration: 1976–1979
- First appearance: January 1976
- Last appearance: May 1979
- Created by: Agnes Nixon
- Introduced by: Agnes Nixon and Bud Kloss
In-universe information
- Other names: Caroline Murray Grant
- Occupation: Nurse; Former soldier
- Husband: Frank Grant (1977-79)

Caroline Murray was played by Patricia Dixon from 1976 to 1979.

Caroline first appears in January 1976 as a new nurse at Pine Valley Hospital who Dr. Frank Grant asks on a platonic date to a hospital function, since Caroline is new in town and Frank's wife Nancy is away in Chicago on work-related business. While Nancy is gone, Frank learns that Caroline is a Vietnam veteran who served multiple tours, both as a combat fighter and as a nurse. She suffered from nightmares and flashbacks to her time in Vietnam, and with Frank's help and treatment, he successfully cures her disorder. (Note: While today Caroline's symptoms are universally recognized as indicative of post-traumatic stress disorder, such terminology was not in use to describe those symptoms at that time, and were typically referred to in the program as Caroline's "flashbacks".) Nancy is very jealous of Caroline, to the point where Caroline's friendship with Frank causes many arguments between the couple. In 1977, after one particular argument, Nancy packs her bags and leaves for Chicago – which she promises to Frank would be for good. Fed up with the distance and the increasing volatility in his marriage, Frank files for divorce and moves on with Caroline.

Caroline becomes good friends with Donna Beck, the woman who captured the heart of the doctor Frank trained, Chuck Tyler. In late 1977, Caroline and Frank are married, despite Frank and Nancy reuniting intimately once without her knowledge. Nancy becomes pregnant with Frank's baby, and she keeps the paternity from everyone except her husband-to-be, Carl Blair. Delirious from pain after his airplane crashed, Carl reveals to the nurse on call – Caroline – that Carl Jr. is not his son, but Frank's, later dying from his injuries. Dr. Jeff Martin also learns of Carl Jr.'s paternity, and assures Caroline that Nancy has no reason to reveal the baby's true paternity. However, in 1979, during a heated argument between Nancy and Frank over the well-being of Carl Jr. and Nancy's choice to date Dr. Russell Anderson, Nancy did indeed reveal that Caroline learned of Carl Jr.'s true paternity, spelling the end of Caroline's marriage to Frank and her time in Pine Valley.

== Myrtle Fargate ==
Myrtle Fargate
- All My Children character
- Portrayed by: Eileen Herlie
- Duration: 1976–2008
- First appearance: 1976
- Last appearance: December 19, 2008
- Created by: Agnes Nixon
In-universe information
- Other names: Mrs Lucy Carpenter
- Occupation: Owner of The Boutique (retired); Landlord of Fargate Boarding House
- Sisters: Claudia Conner
- Husband: Nigel Fargate (?–?)
- Daughters: Rae Cummings
- Granddaughters: Skye Chandler
- Nieces: Ceara Conner
- Other relatives: Lila Rae Alcazar

Myrtle Fargate (also Lum) is a fictional character on the American daytime drama All My Children, as portrayed by Eileen Herlie from 1976 to the actress' death. Even though Herlie died on October 8, her last episode aired on June 23, 2008. On December 19, 2008, Myrtle was remembered for 32 years on the series.

During her years in the carnival, Myrtle began dating Marcello Angelini, an acrobat of the Angelini Brothers, from Naples. The two were in love and wanted to marry, but Marcello's brother had arranged for him to marry another woman from a circus family in Italy. By the time that she found out that she was pregnant with Rae Cummings, he had already married. She gave the baby up for adoption and sometime later Marcello died after doing a dangerous stunt and his brother failed to catch him.

Myrtle Lum comes to Pine Valley, Pennsylvania as a former carny and a somewhat partner-in-crime to Phoebe Tyler Wallingford, as she is trying to break up her son, Lincoln's, marriage to Kitty Shea. She is to pose as her mother, Mrs. Lucy Carpenter. However, a real bond of affection blooms between Kitty and Myrtle. Naturally, the scheme fails, and Phoebe is defeated again. Kitty is dying of a brain disease, and Myrtle and Lincoln vow to make her last months happy ones. They do, and Kitty dies at peace. Myrtle meets a man named Nigel Fargate and eventually marries him, away from Pine Valley. When Nigel dies, Myrtle returns to Pine Valley.

She owns the Boutique, a clothing store that is owned by Lincoln's late sister, Anne Tyler, and also owns a boarding house in Pine Valley. She is best friends with Phoebe's former rival, Mona Kane Tyler, and when Mona dies, she becomes the surrogate mother to Erica Kane (to Myrtle's mind and heart, Erica is her girl). She is also the surrogate grandmother to Erica's children, Kendall Hart, Josh Madden and Bianca Montgomery (Bianca once stayed at Myrtle's boarding house, where she was raped by Michael Cambias). She functions in a great-grandmotherly capacity to Miranda Montgomery, Spike Lavery and Ian Slater as well, Kendall and Bianca's children. As such, she is often considered a member of the Kane-Montgomery family. She also functions as a mother figure to Zach Slater, Kendall's husband, when he needs some clarity in his life. Her last scene on June 23, 2008 is of her giving Zach advice at his Cambias office. The character's run ended on October 8, 2008. with the actress' passing due to pneumonia.

On December 18, 2008, Erica phones Zach with the news of Myrtle's passing. On December 19, those closest to Myrtle (Erica, Zach, Bianca and Opal) receive gifts that she had planned to give to them, and look back (along with Peter Cortlandt, Jesse Hubbard, Angie Hubbard, Frankie Hubbard, Kelly Tyler, Amanda Dillon, Ryan Lavery, Greenlee Smythe, and Jackson Montgomery) at their time with her in flashbacks as the town gathers for a memorial service at Zach's newly rebuilt casino. Zach names a room at the casino the "Fargate Carnival Room" in her honor.

== See also ==
- List of All My Children characters
