= One Life to Live =

American television soap opera

- Genre: Soap opera Drama
- Created by: Agnes Nixon
- Written by: Thom Racina and Jessica Klein (head writers)
- Directed by: See below
- Starring: List of cast members
- Theme music composer: Snoop Lion (web series)
- Opening theme: "Brand New Start", "One Life to Live" (sung by Peabo Bryson in the '80s)
- Country of origin: United States
- Original language: English
- No. of seasons: 45
- No. of episodes: 11,136

Production
- Executive producers: Doris Quinlan (1968–77); Joseph Stuart (1977–83); Jean Arley (1983–84); Paul Rauch (1984–91); Linda Gottlieb (1991–94); Susan Bedsow Horgan (1994–96); Maxine Levinson (1996–97); Jill Farren Phelps (1997–2001); Gary Tomlin (2001–02); Frank Valentini (2003–12); Jennifer Pepperman (2013); Jeffrey Kwatinetz (2013); Richard Frank (2013)
- Producer: See below
- Production locations: New York City, New York (1968–2012); Stamford, Connecticut (2013)
- Running time: 30 minutes (1968–76; 2013); 45 minutes (1976–78); 60 minutes (1978–2012)
- Production companies: Creative Horizons, Inc. (1968–74); ABC (1974–86; 1996–2012); Capital Cities/ABC Video Enterprises Inc. (1986–96); Prospect Park (2013)

Original release
- Network: ABC
- Release: July 15, 1968 – January 13, 2012
- Network: The Online Network
- Release: April 29 – August 19, 2013

Related
- All My Children; General Hospital; The City; Loving; Port Charles

One Life to Live (often abbreviated as OLTL) is an American soap opera broadcast on the ABC television network for more than 43 years, from July 15, 1968, to January 13, 2012, and then on the internet as a web series on Hulu and iTunes via Prospect Park from April 29 to August 19, 2013. Created by Agnes Nixon, the series was the first daytime drama to primarily feature ethnically and socioeconomically diverse characters and consistently emphasize social issues. One Life to Live was expanded from 30 minutes to 45 minutes on July 26, 1976, and then to an hour on January 16, 1978.

One Life to Live heavily focuses on the members and relationships of the Lord family. Actress Erika Slezak began portraying the series' protagonist Victoria Lord in March 1971 and played the character continuously for the rest of the show's run on ABC Daytime, winning a record six Daytime Emmy Awards for the role. In 2002, the series won an Emmy for Outstanding Drama Series.

On September 17, 2010, One Life to Live became the last American daytime soap opera taped in New York City; it earned this distinction after As the World Turns, which had been taped in New York since its 1956 premiere, aired its final episode. No daytime serial has emanated from New York since; ABC's lone soap, General Hospital, CBS's The Young and the Restless and The Bold and the Beautiful, and Peacock's Days of Our Lives are all recorded in California and CBS's other serial, Beyond the Gates, is produced outside of Atlanta.

On April 14, 2011, ABC announced that it was canceling One Life to Live after nearly 43 years on the air due to low ratings. On July 7, 2011, production company Prospect Park announced that it would continue the show as a web series after its run on ABC, but later suspended the project. The show taped its final scenes for ABC on November 18, 2011, and its final episode on the network aired on January 13, 2012, with a cliffhanger. On January 16, 2012, the following Monday, ABC replaced One Life to Live with a new and short-lived talk show called The Revolution that aired until July 6 of the same year.

On January 7, 2013, Prospect Park resumed its plan to continue One Life to Live as a daily 30-minute web series on Hulu and iTunes via The Online Network. The relaunched series premiered on April 29, 2013. The new series was plagued with several behind-the-scenes problems, most notably a litigation between Prospect Park and ABC regarding the misuse of One Life to Live characters on General Hospital. On September 3, 2013, Prospect Park suspended production of the series until the lawsuit with ABC was resolved.

== Creation ==
Impressed with the ratings success of NBC's Another World, ABC sought out Another World writer Nixon to create a serial for them. Though Nixon's concept for the new series was "built along the classic soap formula of a rich family and a poor family," she was "tired of the restraints imposed by the WASPy, noncontroversial nature of daytime drama." One Life to Live would emphasize "the ethnic and socioeconomic diversity" of the characters in its fictional setting. Nixon would go on to create All My Children in 1970 and Loving in 1983.

The initial main titles of the series featured the image of a roaring fireplace, a visual representation of the originally proposed title—Between Heaven and Hell—ultimately changed to One Life to Live to avoid controversy. One Life to Live's first sponsor was the Colgate-Palmolive company, who also sponsored The Doctors. ABC bought the show from Nixon in December 1974 when they purchased all stock to her Creative Horizons, Inc. The show was originally a half-hour serial until it was expanded to 45 minutes on July 23, 1976, and to one hour on January 16, 1978.

== Series history ==
One Life to Live is set in the fictional city of Llanview, a suburb of Philadelphia, Pennsylvania. The show continually centers on the wealthy, White Anglo-Saxon Protestant Lord family, with the working-class Polish-American Wolek family, the less wealthy Irish Catholic Riley family, and the first regular African-American characters in U.S. soap operas, working-class mother and daughter Sadie Gray and Carla Gray, are present at the series' inception. One Life to Live has been called "the most peculiarly American of soap operas: the first serial to present a vast array of ethnic types, broad comic situations, a constant emphasis on social issues, and strong male characters."

From the debut episode, One Life to Live centered on fictional character Victoria "Viki" Lord (originated by Gillian Spencer), portrayed by six-time Daytime Emmy Award winner Erika Slezak for longer than any other One Life to Live series actor, from March 1971 through the series finale January 13, 2012, as well as the 2013 web revival. Long-suffering heroine Viki weathered love and loss, widowhood, rape, divorce, stroke and breast cancer, and was plagued by dissociative identity disorder (or DID, once known as multiple personality disorder) on and off for decades. Viki also had heart problems and received a transplant from her dying husband Ben Davidson (Mark Derwin). Featured male protagonist Dr. Larry Wolek also appeared at the debut episode and for 36 years, played from 1969 until the character's last appearance in 2004 by Emmy-nominated actor Michael Storm.

The apparent murder of Marco Dane (Gerald Anthony) by Victoria Lord in 1979 and the ensuing prostitution storyline of Larry Wolek's wife, Karen Wolek (Judith Light), garnered widespread critical acclaim and several Daytime Emmy Awards. The 1980s brought great ratings success with the introduction of the Buchanan family and the rise to prominence of Viki's scheming sister, Tina Lord (notably played by Andrea Evans). In the 1990s, the show introduced one of the first married interracial couples in soap operas with attorneys Hank and Nora Gannon (Nathan Purdee and Hillary B. Smith, respectively), and the story of the involvement of Viki's estranged brother, Todd (Roger Howarth), with the rape of Marty Saybrooke (Susan Haskell), was called "one of the show's most remembered and impactful."

One Life to Live celebrated its 40th anniversary in July 2008 with the return of several former cast members and by revisiting notable plot lines from its past. "Deceased" characters and even creator Agnes Nixon appeared in a storyline in which Slezak's Viki dies and visits Heaven, an homage to Viki's 1987 heavenly trip. Daytime Emmy Award nominee Andrea Evans and others returned for a tribute to Tina Lord's famous 1987 plunge over the Iguazu Falls and the 1990 royal wedding in fictional Mendorra. And like the 1988 Old West storyline in which the character Clint Buchanan steps back 100 years in the past, on July 21, 2008, Robert S. Woods began an extended storyline in which his character Bo Buchanan finds himself transplanted back into his own past—specifically 1968, the year of the series' inception—witnessing the Buchanan family's backstory unfold. Soap Opera Digest subsequently named One Life to Live their "Best Show" of 2008, calling it "the year's most compelling" series and citing a myriad of story lines the magazine found "heartbreaking," "stunning," and "gripping," as well as complimenting its risk-taking and "diverse and talented" cast.

On August 4, 2009, it was announced that One Life to Live, which was taped in New York City, would move from ABC Studio 17 at 56 West 66th Street to Studio 23 at 320 West 66th Street, Manhattan in early 2010. This studio was made available by the move of sister serial All My Children to a production facility in Los Angeles, where that series began taping on January 4, 2010. The new studio was 30% larger than One Life to Live's previous one, and both One Life to Live and All My Children were to be taped and broadcast in high-definition television (HD) after their moves.

On October 8, 2009, ABC announced that it had postponed the transition to HD for One Live to Live, citing the economic climate at the time, though an ABC spokesperson stated that they "...will re-examine it next year." On December 6, 2010, One Life to Live became the fifth daytime serial to broadcast in the 16:9 aspect ratio widescreen picture format but still not in true HD, after Days of Our Lives, The Young and the Restless, and fellow ABC soap operas All My Children and General Hospital, though those series are produced in high definition. ABC's picture disclaimers at the start of the program list it as being aired in "digital widescreen" rather than HD. The September 17, 2010, series ending of As the World Turns left One Life to Live as the last remaining American daytime serial being produced in the New York metropolitan area as well as the only one produced outside the Los Angeles metropolitan area.

=== Cancellation ===
Rumors about a potential cancellation of One Life to Live arose from TV Guide Canada in late 2009, after ABC announced that it was moving All My Children from New York City to Los Angeles. One Life to Live's lone presence in New York among the ABC soap operas, along its non-transition to HD and its struggling ratings, made it a program at risk of cancellation. The article from TV Guide Canada also pointed that once One Life to Live is cancelled, some of the actors could be offered to join the cast of All My Children in Los Angeles. In May 2010, rumors of possible cancellation of not only One Life to Live, but this time of also All My Children and General Hospital, resurfaced when Walt Disney Television officially announced that it was shutting down Soapnet, effective in 2012. After a failed attempt to give Aisha Tyler a talk show in 2009, ABC restarted auditioning a few pilot shows as candidates for its daytime lineup. At this point, All My Children had the lowest ratings so rumors began heating up in March 2011 about the show's demise, with hints that One Life to Live was safe for a while longer. However, early in April 2011, rumors suggested that both All My Children and One Life to Live were in danger of cancellation.

After months of cancellation rumors, ABC announced on April 14, 2011 that All My Children and One Life to Live would end their runs. ABC cited "extensive research into what today's daytime viewers want and the changing viewing patterns of the audience." The network stated it was replacing One Life to Live with a new production entitled The Revolution, which would focus on health and lifestyles. While the cancellations of both soap operas were announced on the same day, One Life to Live was to remain on the air four months longer because its replacement would not be ready until later. In response to the cancellations, vacuum cleaner manufacturer The Hoover Company withdrew its advertising from all ABC programs out of protest.

The final episode aired on January 13, 2012, with villainess Allison Perkins (Barbara Garrick) narrating her views about the people of Llanview. During the last minutes of the episode, Todd Manning (Howarth) is put under arrest for the murder of twin brother Victor Lord, Jr. (Trevor St. John). The show ends with the discovery that Victor Lord, Jr. is still alive and has been kidnapped by Perkins. Perkins closes the 43-year-old soap opera by breaking the fourth wall by throwing a One Life to Live script at Victor saying to him: "But why spoil what happens next. You of all people should know things are rarely what they appear". The decision to conclude One Life to Live with an open-ended story is because the serial was supposed to continue on another network at the time the last scenes were taped (see section below).

On the day of the final episode, The View hosted a tribute to One Life to Live where several actors were invited including Erika Slezak, Robert S. Woods, Robin Strasser, Hillary B. Smith, Kassie DePaiva, James DePaiva, Andrea Evans, Judith Light and the show's creator Agnes Nixon.

The departure of One Life to Live ended a 62-year history of daytime television soap operas taped in New York which started in 1950 with the CBS daytime drama The First Hundred Years.

=== Cast and characters ===
The season 44 (2011–12) and official ABC Daytime finale cast photo of One Life to Live. Front row (l–r): Portrait of Philip Carey, Patricia Elliott, Hillary B. Smith, Robert S. Woods, show creator Agnes Nixon, Erika Slezak, Jerry verDorn, Melissa Archer, Ilene Kristen Second row: Peter Bartlett, Shenell Edmonds, Eddie Alderson, Austin Williams, Farah Fath, John-Paul Lavoisier, Kassie DePaiva, Roger Howarth, Kristen Alderson, Michael Easton, Mark Lawson, Bree Williamson, David A. Gregory Third row: Lea DeLaria, Josh Kelly, Terri Conn, Shenaz Treasury, Andrew Trischitta, Ted King, Florencia Lozano, Sean Ringgold, Kearran Giovanni, Kelley Missal, Lenny Platt, Nic Robuck

The show originally concentrated on the wealthy, White Anglo-Saxon Protestant Lord family, the less wealthy Siegels (among the first attempts to showcase either an interfaith marriage or Jewish character on daytime television), the middle-class Riley family and Wolek family, and the working-class African-American mother and daughter Sadie Gray and Carla Gray. Heiress Victoria Lord and her extended family remained a prime focus until the series ended. Over the years many other families were introduced, most notably the Buchanan family and the Cramer family, who intermarried with the Lords and also remained a fixture on One Life to Live until its end.

Several actors performed on One Life to Live for 20 years or more, including Erika Slezak, Michael Storm, Robert S. Woods, Philip Carey and Robin Strasser. Actors who became famous for their work on the show and who went on to greater fame with their prime time, feature film or theatre work include Lillian Hayman, Ellen Holly, Tommy Lee Jones, Al Freeman Jr., Laurence Fishburne, Judith Light, Phylicia Rashad, Blair Underwood, Marcia Cross, Roma Downey, Mario Van Peebles, Jessica Tuck, Ryan Phillippe, Hayden Panettiere, Nathan Fillion, Renée Elise Goldsberry and Tika Sumpter.

=== Controversies ===
In 2002, the popularity of antihero Todd Manning (Roger Howarth) prompted ABC to market a rag doll of the character, complete with his signature scar. First offered for sale on April 29, 2002, the doll was pulled on May 7, 2002, after a backlash begun when The Jack Myers Report "harshly criticized the network's judgment" on creating and releasing a doll based on Manning, a character who had notably been convicted of rape in 1993. The New York Times later quoted then-ABC President Angela Shapiro stating, "I was insensitive and take total responsibility for it. I should have been sensitive to the history of the character and I wasn't."

Shortly after receiving a March 2005 GLAAD Media Award for its coverage of LGBT issues, One Life to Live was met with criticism when married district attorney Daniel Colson (Mark Dobies) was revealed to have murdered two people to cover up the fact that he was secretly gay. GLAAD itself criticized the storyline "for reinforcing the idea that being gay is something to be ashamed of," while TV Guide noted "It's hard to disagree with those who say that's a lousy representation of gay folks." Executive Producer Frank Valentini defended the story, saying, "This is a story about the harsher side of intolerance and about one man not being true to himself. There are going to be meaningful, frank discussions that come out of this." Then-head writer Dena Higley explained, "The number one rule of soap opera is never cut drama. Daniel being gay and keeping that a secret is a dramatic story."

In June 2009, actress Patricia Mauceri (a performer on the series since 1995) was replaced in her role as Latin matriarch Carlotta Vega, reportedly after voicing personal religious objections to a planned storyline in which Carlotta would be supportive of a gay relationship.

=== Historical storylines ===
- Storylines: 1968–1979
- Storylines: 1980–1989
- Storylines: 1990–1999
- Storylines: 2000–2012

== Prospect Park ==
=== Unsuccessful revival attempt ===
On July 7, 2011, ABC announced that it had licensed the rights to One Life to Live and All My Children to television, film and music production company Prospect Park, allowing both series to continue producing new first-run episodes beyond the conclusion of their television runs on ABC, with the series moving to a new Hulu-style online channel currently in development by Prospect Park; as a result of the company's acquisition of the two soap operas, One Life to Live and All My Children, would become the first soap operas to transition their first-run broadcasts from traditional television to internet television.

On September 16, 2011, executive producer Frank Valentini was retained by Prospect Park for that serial as well as All My Children when both shows would move to The Online Network. On September 28, 2011, Prospect Park confirmed that One Life to Live would start on its The Online Network internet channel in January 2012, but without specifying the exact date. On September 30, 2011, it was announced that head writer Ron Carlivati would be also heading to the internet version of the show.

Since the agreement made between ABC and Prospect Park was not limited to internet television and did allow for One Life to Live to be broadcast on traditional television, there was an announcement on August 3, 2011, about a possibility of One Life to Live airing on a cable television. On October 5, 2011, the project to bring One Life to Live to cable was reiterated in a New York Times article, where it was revealed that Prospect Park planned to first air episodes on The Online Network, then make them available on video on demand and, then weeks later, on cable television.

On November 23, 2011, Prospect Park officially suspended its plans to continue the show after its run on ABC. Reasons given by Prospect Park included funding problems and poor negotiations with the unions representing the cast of One Life to Live. Writers Guild of America and American Federation of Television and Radio Artists, which, respectively, represent the writer and the actors, have expressed disappointment over Prospect Park's decision. Though not one of the reasons given by Prospect Park, Deadline Hollywood suggested that the company's lack of success in finding a cable network to carry the show may have been instrumental in the company's decision to not pursue the project.

Despite its fruitless attempt to save the series, Prospect Park had succeeded in retaining 13 actors to sign for the online venture, compared to only two actors for All My Children. Matriarch actress Erika Slezak (Victoria Lord) was among the 13. The 12 other actors were Melissa Archer (Nathalie Buchanan), Kassie DePaiva (Blair Cramer), Michael Easton (John McBain), Shenell Edmonds (Destiny Evans), Josh Kelly (Cutter Wentworth), Ted King (Tomás Delgado), Florencia Lozano (Tea Delgado), Kelley Missal (Danielle Manning), Sean Ringgold (Shaun Evans), Andrew Trischitta (Jack Manning), Jerry verDorn (Clint Buchanan) and Tuc Watkins (David Vickers).

=== 2013 revival ===
The new cast of Prospect Park's One Life to Live revival: (l–r) Jerry verDorn, Kassie DePaiva, Melissa Archer, Robert S. Woods, Andrew Trischitta, Laura Harrier, Tuc Watkins, Erika Slezak, Josh Kelly, Florencia Lozano, Kelley Missal, Robert Gorrie

On January 7, 2013, Prospect Park made an official statement about its plans to restart production of One Life to Live and All My Children as web series. The two soap operas will serve as anchor shows for The Online Network (Prospect Park's new streaming television that was supposed to be launched during the original attempt in 2011). Prospect Park inked deals with SAG-AFTRA and DGA. Prospect Park confirmed that former coordinating producer, Jennifer Pepperman had signed on as the new executive producer for the web reboot of One Life to Live. Creator Agnes Nixon would work as consultant for the new web series. On January 13, 2013, it was confirmed that soap opera writers Thom Racina and Susan Bedsow Horgan were named as the new Head Writers of One Life to Live. On April 9, 2013, it was reported that Horgan citing "personal reasons" had stepped down as co-HW, leaving Racina as OLTL's sole HW.

On January 22, 2013, Prospect Park released a full cast of the reboot of One Life to Live who signed on, which include Melissa Archer (Natalie Buchanan), Kassie DePaiva (Blair Cramer), Josh Kelly (Cutter Wentworth), Florencia Lozano (Tea Delgado), Kelley Missal (Danielle Manning), Erika Slezak (Victoria Lord), Hillary B. Smith (Nora Buchanan), Robin Strasser (Dorian Lord), Andrew Trischitta (Jack Manning), Jerry verDorn (Clint Buchanan), Tuc Watkins (David Vickers) and Robert S. Woods (Bo Buchanan). Recurring actors who have signed on are Sean Ringgold (Shaun Evans), Shenaz Treasury (Rama Patel) and Nick Choksi (Vimal Patel).

Production of One Life to Live began on February 25, 2013 with taping of new episodes beginning on March 18, 2013. The series premiered on April 29, 2013, at 12 p.m. Eastern The revived One Life to Live is a 30-minute program taped in Stamford, Connecticut. It is available on Hulu and Hulu Plus as well as various iTunes applications including iPhone, iPad and iPod Touch.

On May 17, 2013, The Online Network announced that All My Children and One Life To Live would no longer air five days a week together, due to viewer ratings that have been seen as certain patterns that resemble more closely the typical patterns of online viewing rather than how one would watch traditional television. Starting May 20, 2013 All My Children and One Life to Life would be presented in a new schedule, with All My Children airing on Mondays and Wednesdays and One Life to Live airing Tuesdays and Thursdays. The recap shows MORE All My Children and MORE One Life To Life would also combine together as one show airing on Fridays. The following day on May 18, 2013, both shows were noticeably missing from the FX Canada website and schedule, and subsequently were available on iTunes Canada; it was later revealed that FX Canada dropped All My Children and One Life to Live due to the reduction of episodes, the carriage agreement called for four episodes a week of both shows. With the reduction, FX Canada has said "the agreement is no longer valid." On May 20, 2013, the first episodes of the new All My Children and One Life To Live were available worldwide on The Online Network's YouTube page, TOLNSoaps.

On May 24, 2013, in a press release Prospect Park announced through Agnes Nixon that Racina would be replaced as head writer of One Life to Live by the then-current screenwriters Jessica Klein and Marin Gazzaniga.

On June 5, 2013, due to a labor dispute with the I.A.T.S.E. All My Children and One Life to Live were forced into an early hiatus with the writers, directors and editors still working; there were talks of production being moved out of state, but those plans were later shelved. On June 20, 2013, a deal was reached between Prospect Park and the Union and taping resumed on August 12, 2013. On June 25, 2013, TOLN announced that there would be a scheduling switch for One Life to Live and All My Children. Starting on July 1 (Monday) all episodes of the week, for both shows, would be released on Mondays.

Beginning July 15, 2013, All My Children and One Life to Live aired for a ten-week limited engagement on the Oprah Winfrey Network Monday through Thursday at 1:00 p.m. and 3:00 p.m.

One Life to Live's first-season finale aired on August 19, 2013.

On September 3, 2013, a report from the Los Angeles Times stated that One Life to Live's second season was to be put on hold while Prospect Park dealt with its lawsuit against ABC over General Hospital's treatment of One Life to Live characters loaned to the series when they crossed over in 2012. In December 2016 the lawsuit was dismissed, with the rights to the series reverting to ABC.

== Transition to General Hospital ==
On December 1, 2011, two weeks after One Life to Live finished taping its final scenes, ABC confirmed that former executive producer Frank Valentini and head writer Ron Carlivati would assume the same roles on General Hospital effective January 9, 2012.

Several former One Life to Live actors—Kassie DePaiva, Roger Howarth, Michael Easton and Kristen Alderson—moved with Valentini and Carlivati and reprised their characters on General Hospital. With the exception of DePaiva, all of these actors were eventually put on contract and stayed permanently with the show. On May 9, 2012, Florencia Lozano joined the cast, reprising her One Life to Live role of Téa Delgado in a recurring capacity.

On April 18, 2013, after Prospect Park had announced they would be reviving the series, Prospect Park filed a lawsuit against ABC, alleging ABC failed to honor its part of their licensing agreement. Among the issues named in the lawsuits included ABC's alleged attempts to sabotage Prospect Park's revival of the soap by killing off One Life to Live characters loaned to General Hospital (Cole and Hope Thornhart), failure on ABC's part to consult Prospect Park on storylines involving One Life to Live characters (breaking up popular One Life to Live couple John and Natalie to pair Michael Easton's John McBain with former Port Charles love interest, Kelly Monaco's Sam Morgan, the death of Tea Delgado's baby and the subsequent switching of her baby with Sam Morgan's live baby, orchestrated by Howarth's Todd Manning), as well as claiming one One Life to Live character Tomas Delgado was actually General Hospital character, Lorenzo Alcazar. Effective immediately, the three One Life to Live characters bound to contracts with ABC were to exit the show, and the three actors who played them, Kristen Alderson, Michael Easton and Roger Howarth were rewritten back onto the General Hospital canvas playing new characters, while Howarth also crossed his character of Todd back over to One Life to Live for its inaugural season.

On September 3, 2013, Prospect Park announced that production of One Life to Live would be on hold until their litigation with ABC was settled.

== Crossovers ==
Throughout the show's history, the plot lines of One Life to Live have been established as existing in the same fictional universe as other ABC-owned daytime series, in particular Agnes Nixon's All My Children, which premiered in 1970. As noted from time to time in both series, fictional Pine Valley—the setting of All My Children—is located in Pennsylvania near One Life to Live's Llanview. Over the years, many characters have crossover from one series to another in both short appearances and extended runs. As early as 1968, General Hospital's Steve Hardy appeared in Llanview to consult on Meredith Lord's blood disease as a means to lead General Hospital viewers to the new series; similarly, One Life to Live's Dr. Larry Wolek visited All My Children shortly after its premiere in 1970.

In 1979, when Viki Riley was on trial for the murder of Marco Dane, she was defended by Pine Valley attorney Paul Martin. Two characters that also appeared on All My Children are Sadie Gray (Lillian Hayman), when she sang for the wedding of Dr. Frank and Caroline Grant, and Delilah Ralston (Shelly Burch), when she designed a special dress to be worn by Erica Kane (Susan Lucci).

In 1999, Daytime Emmy Award-winner Linda Dano returned to One Life to Live as Rae Cummings, a character she had previously played on the series from 1978 to 1980. In a 2000 move of network synergy designed to "entice viewers to tune into soap operas that they might not have usually watched," then-President of ABC Daytime Angela Shapiro orchestrated Dano's concurrent appearance as Gretel on the three other ABC daytime dramas at the time—All My Children, General Hospital and Port Charles—in an extended crossover storyline which was the first time a daytime character had ever appeared on four series. Gretel's search for the child she had given up for adoption takes her to All My Children, where she discovers in 2000 that her own birth mother is Pine Valley's Myrtle Fargate. Following clues to Port Charles and General Hospital, Gretel finally finds her daughter back in Llanview on One Life to Live: Skye Chandler, herself a former All My Children character who had relocated to One Life to Live in 1999. Skye's adopted All My Children father Adam Chandler appears on One Life to Live in 2001, and Gretel initially identifies Skye's biological father as Alan Quartermaine of General Hospital. Both women subsequently appear on that series, with Skye moving to General Hospital full-time in 2001 and Gretel returning to One Life to Live until 2004, making some appearances on General Hospital later in 2002 and 2003.

A December 30, 2003, visit by One Life to Live's Paul Cramer to his estranged secret wife Babe Carey on All My Children ultimately leads to an extensive 2004 "baby switch" storyline which features crossovers of over 20 characters between the two series. With his sister Kelly Cramer desperate for a child to save her marriage after miscarrying her own, Paul finds himself delivering the babies of both Babe and her friend Bianca Montgomery during a rainstorm and subsequent flood in nearby Pine Valley on March 24, 2004. Paul stages a crash with his medical evacuation helicopter; he takes AJ Chandler for Kelly, gives Miranda Montgomery to Babe, and tells Bianca that her baby had died in the accident. Unaware of the child's origins, Kelly brings Babe's infant back to Llanview, passing him off as her child with her husband Kevin Buchanan. Months later, Babe discovers that her daughter is really the grieving Bianca's, but remains silent and allows Paul to manipulate her. Meanwhile, a devastated Kelly discovers that Paul had stolen her son from his mother and, desperate for cash, he blackmails Kelly by threatening to reveal the secret to Kevin. Bianca's daughter is returned to her for Christmas 2004, and once Kevin learns the truth, he and Kelly return Babe's son as well in 2005.

While One Life to Live was off the air from February 2012 to March 2013, the characters of Todd Manning, Starr Manning and John McBain moved to the setting of General Hospital, Port Charles, New York.

After the Prospect Park lawsuit was dismissed, the character of Nora Buchanan made appearances on General Hospital in 2017.

== Executive producers and head writers ==
=== Executive producers ===
Duration	Name
July 1968 – July 1977	Don Wallace, Doris Quinlan and Robert Gorman
July 1977 – August 1983	Joseph Stuart
August 1983 – July 1984	Jean Arley
July 2, 1984 – June 28, 1991	Paul Rauch
September 9, 1991 – June 24, 1994	Linda Gottlieb
July 1994 – October 1996	Susan Bedsow Horgan
October 1996 – December 1997	Maxine Levinson
December 29, 1997 – January 22, 2001	Jill Farren Phelps
January 23, 2001 – January 3, 2003	Gary Tomlin
January 4, 2003 – January 13, 2012	Frank Valentini
April 29, 2013 – August 19, 2013	Jennifer Pepperman

=== Head writers ===
Duration	Name
July 1968 – April 1972	Agnes Nixon; Paul Roberts; Don Wallace
April 1972 – September 1973	Agnes Nixon; Gordon Russell
September 1973 – October 1978	Gordon Russell
November 1978 – March 14, 1980	Gordon Russell; Sam Hall
March 17, 1980 — April 15, 1983	Sam Hall; Peggy O'Shea
April 18, 1983 – November 18, 1983	Sam Hall
November 21, 1983 – August 31, 1984	Sam Hall; Henry Slesar
September 3 – December 14, 1984	John William Corrington; Joyce Hooper Corrington
December 17 – 21, 1984	Sam Hall
December 24, 1984 – June 28, 1985	Sam Hall; Peggy O'Shea
July 1, 1985 – June 5, 1987	Peggy O'Shea
June 8, 1987 – September 14, 1990	S. Michael Schnessel
September 17, 1990 – May 24, 1991	Craig Carlson; Leah Laiman
May 27, 1991 – September 6, 1991	Craig Carlson
September 9, 1991 – September 30, 1992	Michael Malone
October 1, 1992 – September 8, 1995	Josh Griffith; Michael Malone
September 11, 1995 – March 29, 1996	Michael Malone
April 1, 1996 – December 27, 1996	Leah Laiman; Jean Passanante; Peggy Sloane
December 30, 1996 – June 27, 1997	Jean Passanante; Peggy Sloane
June 30, 1997 – March 29, 1998	Claire Labine; Matthew Labine
March 30, 1998 – December 31, 1998	Pam Long
January 4, 1999 – July 15, 1999	Jill Farren Phelps (de facto, uncredited)
July 16, 1999 – October 1, 1999	Gillian Spencer (interim)
October 4, 1999 – November 25, 1999	Gillian Spencer; Megan McTavish
November 29, 1999 – May 4, 2001	Megan McTavish
May 7, 2001 – December 13, 2002	Lorraine Broderick; Christopher Whitesell
December 16, 2002 – January 31, 2003	Lorraine Broderick
February 3, 2003 – March 7, 2003	Josh Griffith
March 10, 2003 – March 22, 2004	Josh Griffith; Michael Malone
March 23, 2004 – November 24, 2004	Michael Malone
November 29, 2004 – December 10, 2004	Brian Frons; Frank Valentini
December 13, 2004 – May 7, 2007	Dena Higley
May 8, 2007 – September 10, 2007	Dena Higley; Ron Carlivati
September 11, 2007 – February 14, 2008	Ron Carlivati
February 15, 2008 – May 1, 2008	Gary Tomlin (2007–08 Writers Guild of America strike)
May 2, 2008 – January 13, 2012	Ron Carlivati
April 29, 2013 – July 1, 2013	Thom Racina; Susan Bedsow Horgan
July 1, 2013 – July 15, 2013	Thom Racina; Susan Bedsow Horgan; Jessica Klein
July 22, 2013 – August 19, 2013	Thom Racina; Jessica Klein

== Awards ==
One Life to Live and many of its actors and crew have been nominated for dozens of awards, winning on many occasions. Erika Slezak has received six Daytime Emmy Awards for her acting, a feat tied only by Anthony Geary and Justin Deas.

In 1993, the series won its first GLAAD Media Award for its storyline on homosexuality and intolerance featuring newcomer Ryan Phillippe as Billy Douglas, a teenager who amidst scandal confides his homosexuality in Andrew Carpenter, played by Robert Krimmer. The character is the first openly gay teenager featured in a television series, and is considered groundbreaking in daytime television. The story arc also included an on-air ceremony for the NAMES Project AIDS Memorial Quilt. In 2005, the series was awarded another GLAAD Media Award for its coverage of LGBT issues in the 2004 coming out storyline of gay character Mark Solomon (Matt Cavenaugh). One Life to Live won the same award again in 2010 for a well-publicized storyline in which police officer Oliver Fish comes out and reunites with his former college boyfriend and medical school student Kyle Lewis.

=== Daytime Emmy Award wins ===
Category	Recipient	Role	Year(s)	Ref.
Daytime Emmy Award for Outstanding Drama Series			2002	
Daytime Emmy Award for Outstanding Lead Actor in a Drama Series	Al Freeman Jr.	Ed Hall	1979	
Daytime Emmy Award for Outstanding Lead Actor in a Drama Series	Robert S. Woods	Bo Buchanan	1983	
Daytime Emmy Award for Outstanding Lead Actress in a Drama Series	Judith Light	Karen Wolek	1980, 1981	
Daytime Emmy Award for Outstanding Lead Actress in a Drama Series	Robin Strasser	Dorian Lord	1982	
Daytime Emmy Award for Outstanding Lead Actress in a Drama Series	Erika Slezak	Victoria Lord	1984, 1986, 1992, 1995, 1996, 2005	
Daytime Emmy Award for Outstanding Lead Actress in a Drama Series	Hillary B. Smith	Nora Gannon	1994	
Daytime Emmy Award for Outstanding Lead Actress in a Drama Series	Susan Haskell	Marty Saybrooke	2009	
Daytime Emmy Award for Outstanding Supporting Actor in a Drama Series	Thom Christopher	Carlo Hesser	1992	
Daytime Emmy Award for Outstanding Supporting Actress in a Drama Series	Susan Haskell	Marty Saybrooke	1994	
Daytime Emmy Award for Outstanding Younger Actor in a Drama Series	Roger Howarth	Todd Manning	1994	

==== Wins in other categories ====
- 2009 Outstanding Achievement in Costume Design for a Drama Series
- 2009 Outstanding Achievement in Makeup for a Drama Series
- 2009 Outstanding Drama Series Directing Team
- 2009 Outstanding Original Song
- 2008 Outstanding Achievement in Costume Design for a Drama Series
- 2008 Outstanding Achievement in Lighting Direction for a Drama Series
- 2008 Outstanding Drama Series Directing Team
- 2008 Outstanding Drama Series Writing Team
- 2008 Outstanding Original Song (two awards for two One Life to Live songs, which tied)
- 2007 Outstanding Achievement in Art Direction/Set Decoration/Scenic Design for a Drama Series
- 2007 Outstanding Achievement in Multiple Camera Editing for a Drama Series
- 2005 Outstanding Achievement in Music Direction and Composition for a Drama Series (tied with All My Children)
- 2005 Outstanding Achievement in Technical Direction/Electronic Camera/Video Control for a Drama Series
- 2003 Outstanding Achievement in Live & Direct to Tape Sound Mixing for a Drama Series
- 2001 Outstanding Achievement in Live & Direct to Tape Sound Mixing for a Drama Series
- 2001 Outstanding Achievement in Technical Direction/Electronic Camera/Video Control for a Drama Series
- 2000 Outstanding Achievement in Costume Design for a Drama Series
- 2000 Outstanding Achievement in Live & Direct to Tape Sound Mixing for a Drama Series
- 2000 Outstanding Achievement in Music Direction and Composition for a Drama Series
- 2000 Outstanding Original Song
- 1994 Outstanding Drama Series Writing Team
- 1987 Outstanding Drama Series Writing Team
- 1984 Outstanding Achievement in Technical Excellence for a Daytime Drama Series
- 1984 Outstanding Direction for a Daytime Drama Series
- 1983 Outstanding Direction for a Daytime Drama Series
- 1982 Outstanding Achievement in Any Area of Creative Technical Crafts: Lighting Direction (Everett Melosh)
- 1976 Outstanding Individual Director for a Daytime Drama Series (David Pressman)
- 1974 Outstanding Technical Direction and Electronic Camerawork

=== Other awards ===
- Writers Guild of America Award (1986, 1993)
- Directors Guild of America Award (1993, 1998, 2000, 2003, 2006, 2007, 2008, 2010, 2012)

== Broadcast history ==
ABC cemented its reputation as a youth-oriented network in daytime with the addition of One Life to Live to its schedule, with much of the rest of its lineup consisting of soap operas like Dark Shadows, sitcom reruns, and game shows packaged by Chuck Barris. One Life to Live replaced the short-lived The Baby Game, in a three-way shuffle with Dark Shadows and The Dating Game. The network placed the new serial at 3:30 p.m. Eastern, against CBS's established hit The Edge of Night and the popular NBC game You Don't Say!. Despite the tough competition, the intense tone of the plot and strong characters allowed the show to get a leg up on You Don't Say, wearing that game down to the point of its cancellation in September 1969; NBC replaced the Tom Kennedy-hosted game in that time slot with three unsuccessful serials: Bright Promise, Return to Peyton Place and How to Survive a Marriage.

One Life to Live initially enjoyed fair-to-middling ratings, but rose rapidly as it entered the 1970s, along with the rest of ABC's daytime lineup. Matters greatly improved for One Life to Live in 1972, when CBS relocated The Edge of Night in response to packager Procter & Gamble's demands. The four-year-old show topped the ratings for the first time over CBS's declining The Secret Storm, and later, the game Hollywood's Talking, which ran for only 13 weeks.

By 1975, NBC became a serious player in that time slot for the first time in over five years when it expanded its strong soap opera Another World to an hour, with its second half occupying the 3:30 timeslot. One Life to Live lost a substantial audience share, but its lead-in, General Hospital, experienced even worse losses. ABC then expanded both One Life to Live and General Hospital to 45 minutes, with each composing half of a 90-minute block between 2:30 p.m. and 4 p.m. Beginning on July 26, 1976, One Life to Live assumed the first position, at 2:30. ABC bet its hopes on viewers staying tuned past the half hour, making them unlikely to switch channels to Another World and All in the Family reruns on CBS (or The Match Game in the case of General Hospital fans). This approach showed some promise, until November 7, 1977, when CBS expanded Guiding Light to an hour. As One Life to Live struggled, its neighbor General Hospital was in danger of cancellation after a 15-year run. In order to save General Hospital (which was airing at 3:15 p.m.) from cancellation, ABC expanded both soaps to an hour beginning on January 16, 1978; The $20,000 Pyramid was moved to the noon Eastern timeslot, where it remained until its run ended in June 1980. ABC contemplated an expansion of The Edge of Night to a full hour if either of these shows were cancelled.

General Hospital rose rapidly to the top spot in the Nielsen ratings by 1979. As for One Life to Live, from its tenth birthday onward, its competitors declined in popularity. Search for Tomorrow, for instance, spent its last several months on CBS against the last half of One Life to Live. Its replacement, Capitol, did little better, and after its cancellation, CBS aligned As the World Turns against One Life to Live and Another World, a configuration that stayed in place until Another World's cancellation in 1999. The 1980s saw One Life to Live reach the height of its popularity, with an estimate of 9 million viewers early in the decade. The show typically ranked between the second and the fourth positions in the 1980s.

Since 1991, One Life to Live returned to the middle of the pack, but its numbers declined, in common with all other soap operas. By the decade's end, the show rested near the bottom of the ratings pack, and it continued to hover around the lower reaches of the weekly ratings throughout the 2000s in terms of total number of viewers; however, the show tended to rank in the mid-range for the target demographic of women aged 18–49, often higher than sister show All My Children and usually still winning its timeslot in the key demographic, well ahead of its competitors such as As The World Turns, Another World and Passions. During the 2000s (decade), One Life to Live ran about even with As the World Turns, with NBC's Another World replacement Passions trailing significantly.

The 2009–2010 season was a particularly difficult year for One Life to Live. During the week of June 28, 2010, the show ranked last among all soap operas with 2.1 million viewers, compared to 2.3 million for As the World Turns. As One Life to Live entered the 2010–2011 season, ratings improved, but not enough to prevent ABC from cancelling the program on April 14, 2011. After the cancellation announcement, One Life to Live began to surpass General Hospital in total number of viewers, but General Hospital continued to dominate One Life to Live in several specific categories, most notably the key demographic of women between 18 and 49 years old, usually prioritized by daytime networks. By November 2011, One Life to Live had dethroned General Hospital in every category. Overall, One Life to Live was the third highest rated program among the five remaining soap operas in its last season, trailing The Young and the Restless and The Bold and the Beautiful, but ahead of General Hospital and Days of Our Lives. The show averaged a 2.3 rating and 3.12 million daily viewers during its final week. Its final episode on January 13, 2012 drew in a 2.7 rating and 3.848 million viewers, one of the highest ratings in the history of soap opera finales.

The One Life to Live continuation's ratings proved impressive. The first episode was the second most downloaded TV episode on iTunes and second most watched episode on Hulu, with the first place on both sites going to All My Children which premiered the same day.

== Schedule ==
The show aired on ABC Daytime for the entirety of its original television run.

One Life to Live broadcast history
Start date	End date	Time slot	Run time (minutes)
July 15, 1968	July 23, 1976	3:30 p.m. (ET/PT)†/2:30 p.m. (CT)	30
July 26, 1976	January 13, 1978	2:30 p.m. (ET)/1:30 p.m. (CT/PT)	45
January 16, 1978	January 13, 2012	2:00 p.m. (ET)/1:00 p.m. (CT/PT)	60

† From April 1, 1974 until July 23, 1976, One Life to Live aired at 2:30 p.m. in the Pacific Time Zone.

The show aired on Hulu, Hulu Plus and iTunes during its revival.

- April 29, 2013 – May 9, 2013: one new episode a day, Monday through Thursday.
- May 13, 2013 – June 28, 2013: a new episode each Tuesday and Thursday.
- July 1, 2013 – August 19, 2013: two new episodes every Monday.

Reruns of the show aired on OWN from July 15, 2013 to September 2013.

- July 15 – August 2, 2013: 2:00–4:00 p.m. (1:00–3:00 p.m., CT/PT)
- August 5 – September 6, 2013: 1:30–2:00 p.m. (12:30–1:00 p.m., CT/PT)

=== Cable ===
Soapnet aired classic One Life to Live episodes at 6:00 a.m. (5:00 a.m. CT/PT), 7:00 a.m. (6:00 a.m. CT/PT) and 8:00 a.m. (7:00 a.m. CT/PT).

Starting July 15, 2013, OWN began a ten-week trial run of both One Life to Live and All My Children on its daytime lineup. Episodes of One Life to Live are broadcast at 1:30 p.m., following All My Children which airs at 1:00 p.m., Mondays through Thursdays.

== See also ==
- List of longest-serving soap opera actors
- List of One Life to Live characters
- List of One Life to Live cast members
