= Agnes Nixon =

American soap opera screenwriter (1922–2016)

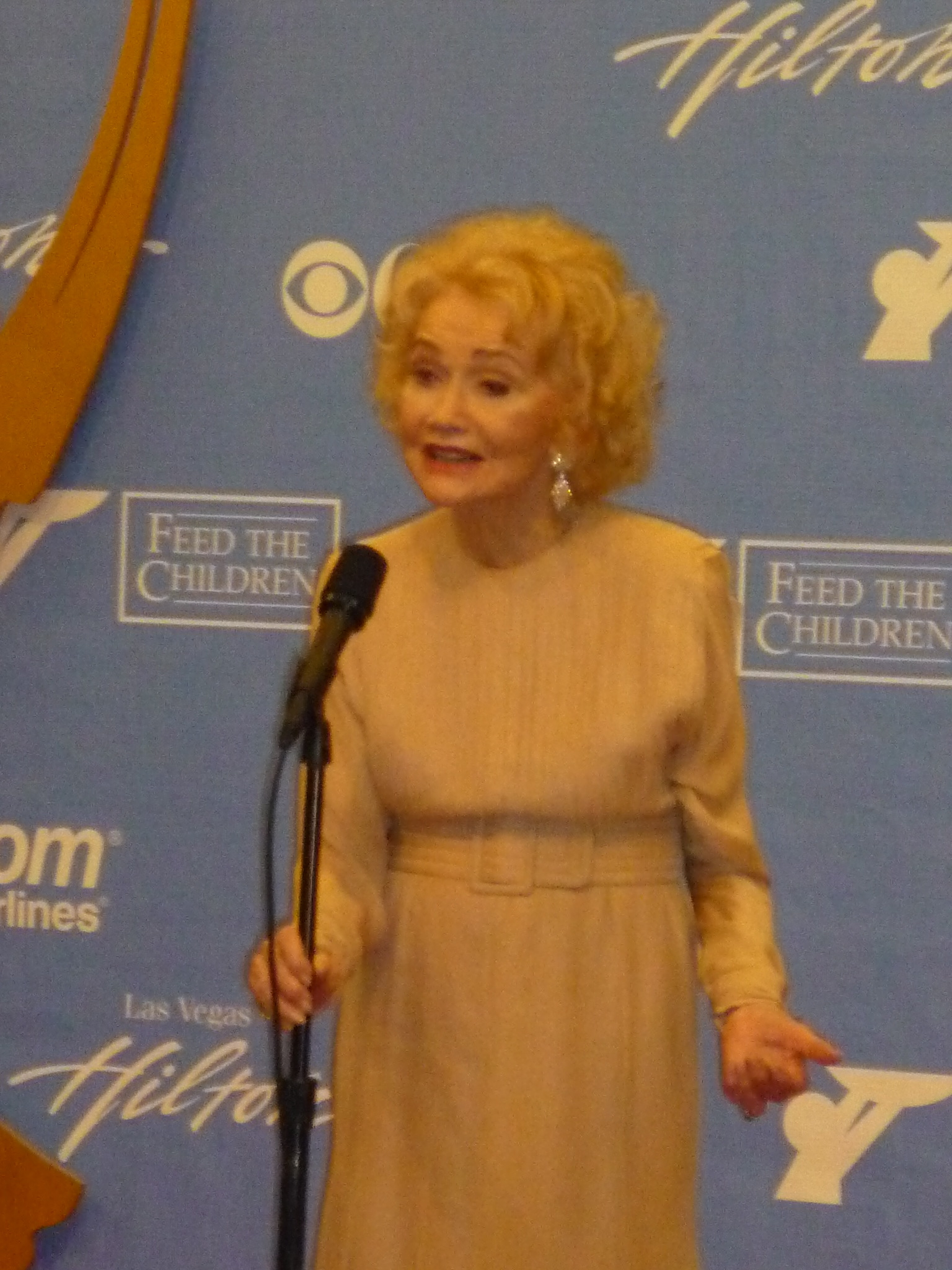
- Nixon at the 2010 Daytime Emmy Awards
- Born: Agnes Eckhardt; December 10, 1922; Chicago, Illinois, U.S.
- Died: September 28, 2016 (aged 93); Haverford, Pennsylvania, U.S.
- Occupations: Screenwriter, producer
- Years active: 1944–2016
- Notable work: One Life to Live; All My Children; Loving
- Political party: Democratic
- Spouse: Robert Henry Adolphus Nixon (m. 1951; died 1996)
- Children: 4 (including Robert Nixon)
- Website: agnesnixon.com

Agnes Nixon (née Eckhardt; December 10, 1922 – September 28, 2016) was an American television writer and producer, and the creator of the ABC soap operas One Life to Live, All My Children, as well as Loving and its spin-off The City.

Nixon's work as producer and writer expanded storylines for American daytime television – the first health-related storyline, the first storyline related to the Vietnam War, as well as both the first televised lesbian kiss and abortion. She won five Writers' Guild of America Awards, five Daytime Emmy Awards, and in 2010, received the Lifetime Achievement Award from the National Academy of Television Arts and Sciences. Nixon was often referred to as the "Queen of The Modern American Soap Opera".

== Career ==
=== Early years ===
Nixon was born Agnes Eckhardt on December 10, 1922, in Chicago, Illinois, the daughter of Agnes Patricia (née Dalton) and Harry Joseph Eckhardt. She attended Northwestern University, where she was a member of Alpha Chi Omega sorority. She began her career in soaps working for Irna Phillips. Under her tutelage, Nixon was a writer on Woman in White and As the World Turns, and was head writer for Search for Tomorrow, Guiding Light, and Another World.

During her time on Guiding Light, Nixon is believed to have written the first health-related storyline on a daytime soap opera. A friend of Nixon's had died from cervical cancer, and Nixon wanted to do something to educate women about getting a pap smear. She wrote it into Guiding Light by having the lead character, Bert Bauer, experience a cancer scare. The storyline aired in 1962. In 2002, she was the inaugural recipient of the Pioneer for Health Award from Sentinel for Health for her work on the episode.

=== One Life to Live ===
By the mid-1960s, Nixon had created a blueprint for what would become All My Children. CBS executives passed on the program, due to contractual issues with sponsor Lever Brothers, who sponsored a program that All My Children would replace in its time slot. Later ABC asked her to create a show that would reflect a more "contemporary" tone; that creation was One Life to Live. Nixon, "tired of the restraints imposed by the WASPy, non-controversial nature of daytime drama", presented the network with a startlingly original premise and cast of characters. Although the show was built along the classic soap formula of a rich family (the Lords) and a poor family (the Woleks), One Life to Live emphasized the ethnic and socioeconomic diversity of the people of Llanview, Pennsylvania, a fictional Main Line suburb of Philadelphia."

Premiering in 1968, One Life to Live reflected changing social structures and attitudes. The first few years of the show were rich in issue stories and characters including a Jewish character (Dave Siegel), an Irish American family (the Rileys), and some of the first African American leading roles in soap operas with Sadie Gray (Lillian Hayman), Carla Gray (Ellen Holly) and Ed Hall (Al Freeman Jr.). Carla's story, for example, had her develop from a character who was passing as white to one who embodied black pride, with white and black lovers along the way, to antagonize racists. One Life to Live has been called "the most peculiarly American of soap operas: the first serial to present a vast array of ethnic types, broad comic situations, a constant emphasis on social issues, and strong male characters."

=== All My Children ===
With the success of One Life to Live, Nixon was given the greenlight for All My Children, which began as a half-hour soap opera in 1970. The show was successful from its beginning, combining its study of social clashes with acting talent including Ruth Warrick (Phoebe Tyler) and Rosemary Prinz (Amy Tyler). Nixon helmed the writing team for over a decade, until 1983, and again introduced many social issues into storylines, including the Vietnam War, the anti-war movement, homosexuality, the AIDS epidemic, and American television's first onscreen abortion.

All My Children was a half-hour show for the first seven years of its run, and virtually no recordings of those episodes survive; ABC erased the videotapes of those early episodes for their reuse. When ABC went to Nixon and said that they wanted her to expand the show to an hour in 1975, she resisted due to her own creative/quality concerns but later agreed under the condition that the tapes of the show would be archived and preserved by the network. Episodes began to be saved in 1976, and All My Children expanded to an hour on April 25, 1977.

In 1992, ABC executives decided that All My Children needed new blood and promoted a Nixon protégé, Megan McTavish, to the position of head writer. Nixon continued to be involved with the show, but wanted to take a step back from the grueling day-to-day task of being a head writer. McTavish made some important changes by re-writing major storylines and was dismissed in early 1995. Lorraine Broderick returned as head writer, working alongside Nixon to return the show to its socially relevant, character-driven roots. Broderick and Nixon went on to accept three consecutive Daytime Emmy awards for Outstanding Writing Team. Still, in late 1997, ABC abruptly decided to bring back McTavish. This move led to Nixon's electing to step back from her story consulting role.

In early 1999, McTavish was dismissed for the second time and Nixon was again asked to take over the headwriting reins at All My Children. Nixon again wove social issues into the show, by having a major character "come out". In 2000, Erica's daughter, Bianca Montgomery (Eden Riegel), returned to Pine Valley and came out as a lesbian to her mother and to all of Pine Valley. This storyline led to All My Children's winning a casting Artios award, a GLAAD Media Award, and a nomination for a Daytime Emmy for Best Drama Series.

=== Loving/The City ===
In 1983, Nixon began another series called Loving, which she co-created with Douglas Marland. The half-hour program debuted on ABC in June of that year and was set in the fictional town of Corinth, Pennsylvania. Loving struggled to gain a foothold in a crowded daytime schedule and ended its run in 1995. Nixon was given co-creator credit for Loving's continuation series, The City. The show was cancelled in 1997 due to low ratings.

=== On-screen appearances ===
Nixon appeared in her shows on a number of occasions. In both All My Children and One Life to Live she played the character Agnes Eckhardt. She also played the characters Aggie on All My Children and Agnes Dixon on One Life to Live.

== Personal life and death ==
She was married to Robert Henry Adolphus Nixon from April 6, 1951, until his death in 1996, and had four children. Nixon died in Haverford, Pennsylvania, on September 28, 2016, at age 93. The New York Times reported the cause of death to be "pneumonia resulting from Parkinson's disease".

Nixon's memoirs, published in 2017, was titled My Life to Live: How I Became the Queen of Soaps When Men ruled the Airwaves (ISBN 978-0-451-49823-6).

== Awards and recognition ==
- In 1973, she was nominated for a Primetime Emmy for Outstanding Program Achievement in Daytime Drama for One Life to Live
- In 1977, Nixon won Outstanding Achievement in the World of Daytime Drama at the Soapy Awards.
- In 1981, she received the Trustees Award for Continued Excellence from the National Academy of Television Arts & Sciences.
- In 1985, Nixon won a Daytime Emmy for Outstanding Writing in a Drama Series for All My Children.
- In 1988, 1996, 1997 and 1998, Nixon's All My Children writing team won Outstanding Drama Series Writing Team at the Daytime Emmys. The team was nominated for the award on a further 12 occasions (1990, 1991, 1992, 1993, 1995, 2001, 2002, 2003, 2004, 2009, 2010 and 2012).
- In 1992, she was inducted into the Television Academy Hall of Fame.
- In 1993, she received the Golden Plate Award of the American Academy of Achievement.
- In 1994, she was inducted into the Soap Opera Hall of Fame; she was the first female writer to be inducted into this hall.
- In 1996, Nixon won the Editor's Choice Award at the Soap Opera Digest Awards.
- Nixon won Writers Guild of America Awards for Best Written Daytime Serial in 1997, 1999, 2001, 2002 and 2004. She was also nominated for the award on a further seven occasions.
- Nixon received the Lifetime Achievement Award from the National Academy of Television Arts and Sciences during the ceremonies of the 37th annual Daytime Emmy Awards in June 2010.
