= Lillian Hayman =

American actress and singer

- Born: Lillian Irene Hayman; July 17, 1922; Baltimore, Maryland, U.S.
- Died: October 25, 1994 (aged 72); Hollis, Queens, New York, U.S.
- Education: (BA) Wilberforce University
- Occupations: Actress; singer
- Years active: 1965–1990
- Known for: Sadie Gray – One Life to Live

Lillian Irene Hayman (July 17, 1922 – October 25, 1994) was an American actress and singer. A native of Baltimore, Maryland, Hayman was known for her role as Sadie Gray in the ABC television soap opera One Life to Live (1968–1986). She was also a notable actress on Broadway, originating roles in several new musicals including Doctor Jazz, Hallelujah, Baby!, 70, Girls, 70, and Kwamina.

== Biography ==
=== Career ===
Born in Baltimore, Maryland, Hayman graduated from Wilberforce University with a BA before she began her career in the Broadway theatre. Hayman won the 1968 Tony Award for "Best Supporting Actress in a Musical", in which she portrayed the mother of Leslie Uggams's character in the play Hallelujah, Baby!.

Her performance attracted the casting agents for One Life to Live, who cast her as Sadie Gray. Hayman played Sadie Gray from 1968 until 1986. Hayman briefly left the cast of One Life to Live to appear in the primetime musical comedy series The Leslie Uggams Show. She also appeared in the 1971 Broadway production of the Kander and Ebb musical 70, Girls, 70. Hayman's One Life to Live option was not renewed in 1986 by then-executive producer Paul Rauch. According to co-star Ellen Holly's 1998 memoir, One Life: The Autobiography of an African American Actress, Hayman didn't even know that she had been fired until Rauch's assistant approached her in the parking garage as she was leaving the studio and walking to her Tercel: "Mr. Rauch wants you to know that you just worked your last day." Hayman also portrayed Lucrezia Borgia in the 1975 film Mandingo, and made her final feature film appearance in that film's 1976 sequel, Drum.

== Personal life and death ==
Hayman never married and had no children. On October 25, 1994, Hayman died of a heart attack at her home in Hollis, Queens, New York. She was 72 years old.

== Filmography ==
Film
Year	Film	Role	Notes
1968	The Night They Raided Minsky's	Singer in Speakeasy Sings: "Damn You!"	Alternative title: The Night They Invented Striptease
1975	Mandingo	Lucrezia Borgia	
1976	Drum	Lucrezia Borgia	
Television
Year	Title	Role	Notes
1968–1986	One Life to Live	Sadie Gray	Original cast member 1968–1970; 1973; 1978-1986
1969	The Leslie Uggams Show	Regular cast member	10 episodes
1970	Barefoot in the Park		Episode: "Somethin' Fishy"
1970	The Mod Squad		1 episode
1972	Love, American Style	Gloria	1 episode
1972	The Corner Bar		1 episode
