= Ellen Holly =

American actress (1931–2023)

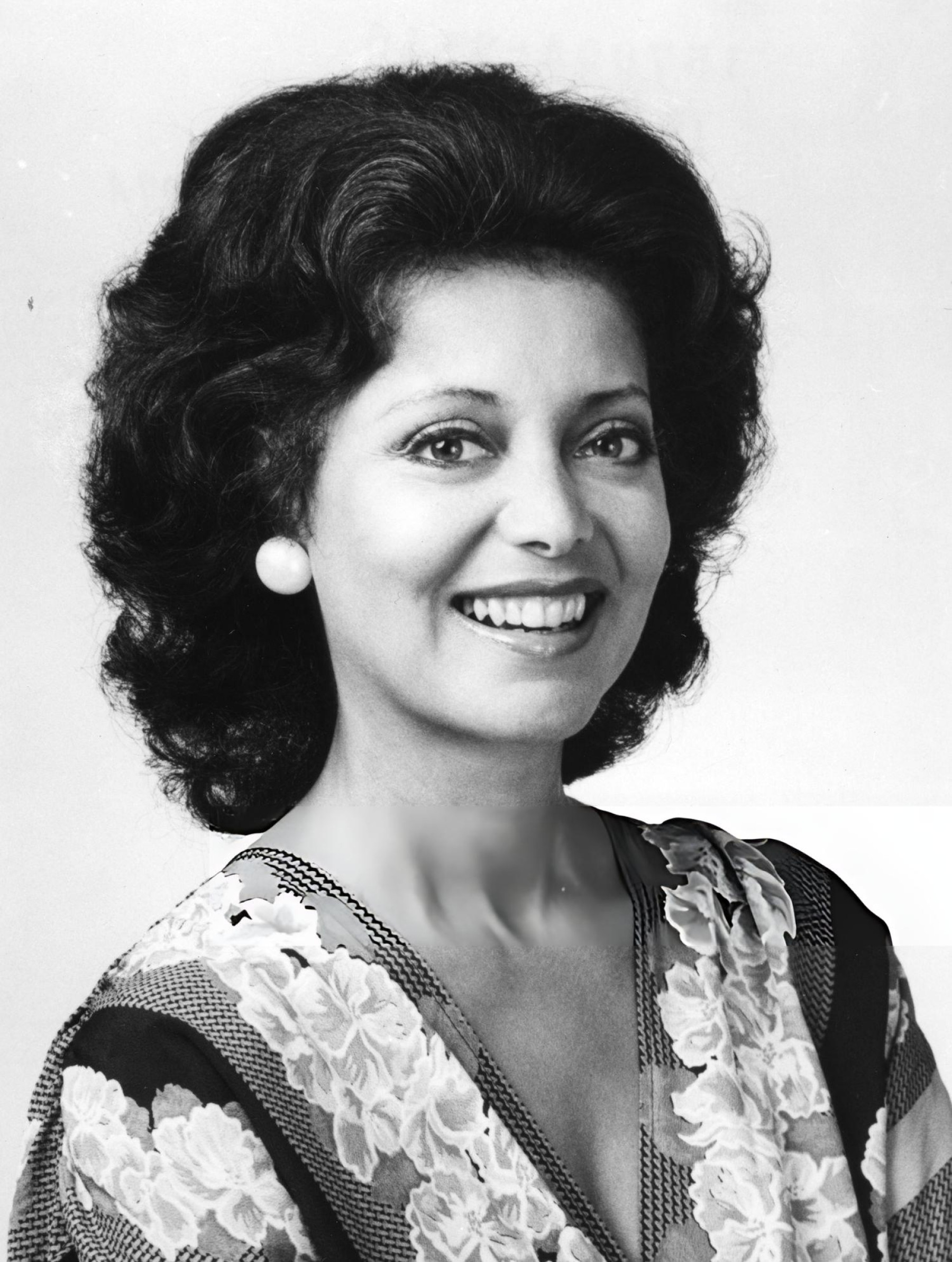
- Holly in One Life to Live (1975)
- Born: Ellen Virginia Holly; January 16, 1931; Manhattan, New York, U.S.
- Died: December 6, 2023 (aged 92); The Bronx, New York, U.S.
- Education: Hunter College
- Years active: 1959–1993; 2002
- Known for: Being the first African-American to appear in a lead role on an American soap opera (One Life to Live)
- Works: see Filmography
- Partners: Roger Hill (1974–1977); Harry Belafonte; Ron O'Neal

Ellen Virginia Holly (January 16, 1931 – December 6, 2023) was an American actress. Beginning her career on stage in the late 1950s, Holly was perhaps best known for her role as Carla Gray–Hall on the ABC soap opera One Life to Live (1968–1980; 1983–1985). Holly is noted as the first African American to appear on daytime television in a leading role.

== Biography ==
=== Early life, education and family ===
Holly was born on January 16, 1931, in New York City, to William Garnet Holly and Grace Holly. Raised in Richmond Hills neighborhood of Queens, Holly graduated from Hunter College. Holly was African American, and claimed African, English, French, and Shinnecock Native heritage. Her father's grandmother was Susan Smith McKinney Steward, the third African-American woman to earn a medical degree, and the first in New York state. Her grandaunt was Sarah Smith Thompson Garnet, an educator and suffragist from New York City who was a pioneering African-American female school principal in the New York City public school system. Holly's great-grandfather was the Rev. James Theodore Holly, the first African-American bishop in the Protestant Episcopal church, who spent most of his episcopal career as missionary bishop of Haiti. A great-great-grandfather was Sylvanus Smith, one of many leaders encouraging African American people to purchase land in Kings County, New York (later known as the Weeksville settlement). Her maternal aunt was Anna Arnold Hedgeman, a civil rights leader, politician, educator, and writer who served under President Harry Truman as executive director of the National Council for a Permanent Fair Employment Practices Commission.

=== Career ===
Holly, a life long member of The Actors Studio, Began her acting career in the late-1950s. Holly appeared in several Broadway productions including Tiger, Tiger Burning Bright and A Hand Is on the Gate; she also played Desdemona in a production of Othello by the New York Shakespeare Festival. In 1960, Holly resolved a "feud" with producer Lester Osterman when he cast her in a play. Holly guest-starred on Sam Benedict and The Nurses prior to starring on One Life to Live.

==== One Life to Live ====
Holly came to the attention of Agnes Nixon, the creator of One Life to Live, after writing a letter to the editor of The New York Times about what it was like to be a light-skinned African American. Nixon created the role of Carla Gray, actress-turned-judge and offered Holly the role. In 1968, Holly became the first African-American actress to star on daytime television. "She is beautiful, plainly cultured, has one of the most alive faces, full of lovely strength, ever to brighten our tube," wrote television reporter Jack O'Brian in 1969. When Holly began on One Life to Live in October 1968, her African-American heritage was not publicized as part of the storyline. Holly's character, named Carla Benari, was a touring actress of apparently Italian-American heritage. Carla and white physician Dr. Jim Craig fell in love and became engaged, but she was falling for an African-American doctor. When the two kissed onscreen, it was reported that the switchboards at ABC were busy by fans who thought that the show had shown an African-American and white person kissing. The fact that Carla was an African-American posing as white was revealed when Sadie Gray, played by Lillian Hayman, was identified as her mother. Sadie convinced her daughter to embrace her heritage and tell the truth. Holly left the series in 1980, but returned in 1983. In 1972, Holly was public in her criticism of Anthony Quinn being cast to play Haitian general Henri Christophe. Holly returned to the question of race and casting when she commented on Jonathan Pryce's role in Miss Saigon in 1990. In 1996, Holly released her autobiography describing her life and struggles as a light-skinned black actress in Hollywood. According to her autobiography One Life: The Autobiography of an African American Actress, Holly was fired from the show by new executive producer Paul Rauch in 1985.

==== Later career and life ====
In 1988, Holly appeared in Spike Lee's School Daze as Mission College president Mr. McPherson's wife Odrie. Holly returned to daytime in the long-term recurring role of a judge on Guiding Light from 1989 until 1993. Holly made a return to the small screen in 2002, when she appeared as Selena Frey in the television film 10,000 Black Men Named George, alongside Andre Braugher and Mario Van Peebles. Holly retired from acting in 1993 and became a librarian in White Plains, New York.

=== Personal life and death ===
Holly was a member of Delta Sigma Theta sorority. Holly never married nor had children. She had a relationship with her One Life to Live co-star Roger Hill, who is also known for his role as Cyrus in the cult film The Warriors (1979). In her autobiography, Holly wrote about her romances with actors Harry Belafonte and Ron O'Neal. Holly died at Calvary Hospital in the Bronx on December 6, 2023, at the age of 92.

== Filmography ==
Film
Year	Film	Role	Notes
1959	Take a Giant Step	Carol, the Girl in the Bar	
1973	Cops and Robbers	Secretary	
1988	School Daze	Odrie McPherson	
Television
Year	Title	Role	Notes
1963	The Defenders	Janet Lamb	1 episode
1963	Sam Benedict	Elissa Reagan	1 episode
1963–1964	The Nurses	Helena Fuentes; Natalia Cortez	2 episodes
1964	Dr. Kildare	Lucille Mann	1 episode
1968–1986	One Life to Live	Clara Hall/Carla Scott/Carla Bonari	91 episodes
1974	King Lear	Regan	Television movie
1978	Sergeant Matlovich vs. the U.S. Air Force	Amy	Television movie
1985	ABC Afterschool Special	Mrs. Robbins	1 episode
1986	Spenser: For Hire	Amanda Layton	1 episode
1989–1990	In the Heat of the Night	Ruth Peterson	4 episodes
1989–1993	Guiding Light	Judge Collier	Unknown episodes
2002	10,000 Black Men Named George	Selena Frey	Television movie

== Broadway credits ==
Year	Title	Role	Theatre	Notes
1956	Too Late the Phalarope	Stephanie	Belasco	Based on a novel by Alan Paton
1960	Face of a Hero	Elizabeth Falk	Eugene O'Neill	With Ed Asner, Sandy Dennis and Jack Lemmon
1962–1963	Tiger, Tiger Burning Bright	Cille Morris	Booth	Written by Peter Feibleman; Alvin Ailey, Roscoe Lee Browne, and Cicely Tyson were also in the cast
1966	A Hand is on the Gate		Longacre	With Roscoe Lee Browne, James Earl Jones, Gloria Foster, and Cicely Tyson
