= Redux Redux =

2025 film by Kevin and Matthew McManus

- Theatrical release poster
- Directed by: Kevin McManus; Matthew McManus
- Written by: Kevin McManus; Matthew McManus
- Produced by: Michael J. McGarry; Kevin McManus; Matthew McManus; Nate Cormier; PJ McCabe
- Starring: Michaela McManus
- Cinematography: Alan Gwizdowski
- Edited by: Derek Desmond; Nate Cormier
- Music by: Paul Koch
- Production company: Mothership Motion Pictures
- Distributed by: Saban Films
- Release dates: March 8, 2025 (SXSW); February 20, 2026 (United States)
- Running time: 109 minutes
- Country: United States
- Language: English

Redux Redux (aka Find. Kill. Repeat) is a 2025 American science fiction thriller film written and directed by Kevin and Matthew McManus. It stars Michaela McManus as a woman who obsessively and repeatedly kills her daughter's murderer in parallel universes. As the first film of their new studio Mothership Motion Pictures, the McManus brothers produced Redux Redux alongside Michael J. McGarry, Nate Cormier, and PJ McCabe.

The film premiered at the 2025 South by Southwest Film & TV Festival as part of the Midnighter category. Saban Films released the picture in North America on February 20, 2026.

== Plot ==
Irene Kelly's daughter Anna is murdered by a restaurant cook named Neville. She travels through various parallel universes to kill Neville's other selves using a universe-hopping machine. In one of these universes she encounters teenage runaway Mia, whom Neville plans to kill. Irene causes Neville to flee, saving Mia’s life.

She sends Mia on her way, but realizes the teen stole her gun, so she sets out to find her. Mia hitch-hikes towards Neville’s hideout, intending to kill him, but is soon found by Irene, and the two form a truce to stop him.

When Neville walks into a gas station, there is a gunfight between him, Irene, and the clerk, who is shot by Neville. Irene tells Mia to climb in her universe-hopping machine, and after she shoots Neville, the pair arrive in a new universe where the clerk is still living. Irene explains how she has spent years tracking Neville variants down, but the latest hop has destroyed the fuel core.

Irene tracks down a pair of smugglers to obtain a replacement part. The smugglers want Mia in exchange for it. Irene angrily says they are leaving, but Billie, the head smuggler, attempts to defuse the situation. She tells Irene that they don’t have enough cash for the part in new condition, but that she may have a refurbished one in her vehicle. Once outside, she attempts to lock Irene and Mia in a large hopper, but they escape and kill one of the smugglers, taking the fuel core with them.

The two end up in a new universe, where Irene explains she is the only version of herself that didn't die by suicide after Neville killed Anna, and she sometimes uses her abandoned home as a temporary base. While Mia sleeps, Irene goes to Neville's home and finds that he has murdered the new universe's Mia. A shaken Irene returns to Mia, whom she has grown to care for. When Irene says they should stop killing, Mia gets angry and causes Irene to flee to another universe where Neville was imprisoned 15 years prior, meaning this Anna is alive.

Irene goes to her home, where she sees herself and Anna, who seem happy. She reveals herself to Anna and says goodbye.

Meanwhile, Mia shoots Neville as he is about to take the deceased Mia to his hideout, but Neville manages to knock her out.

He takes her and the dead Mia to his hideout. After he puts Mia in a barrel and throws her into a lake, Irene arrives and shoots him. Neville recognizes Irene as the mother of a victim, and he throws her into the lake after she gets caught in a bear trap. As Irene sinks, Mia frees herself and kills Neville, and Irene resurfaces after freeing herself.

The two return to the deceased Irene's home, where Irene sets the machine on fire. She then sits next to Mia, who puts her head on Irene’s shoulder as they watch the machine burn.

== Cast ==
- Michaela McManus as Irene Kelly
- Stella Marcus as Mia
- Jeremy Holm as Neville
- Jim Cummings as Jonathan
- Grace Van Dien as Anna
- Taylor Misiak as Billie
- Dendrie Taylor as Daria
- Michael Manuel as Travis

== Production ==
Filmmaking duo Kevin and Matthew McManus wrote and directed Redux Redux, their third feature film following Funeral Kings (2012) and The Block Island Sound (2021). It was also their third collaboration with their sister, actress Michaela McManus, and her first in a leading role.

Filming took place in the Santa Clarita Valley in June 2024, with production concluding in August 2024.

== Release ==
Redux Redux premiered at the 2025 South by Southwest Film & TV Festival on March 8 as part of the Midnighter category.

In May 2025, Saban Films acquired North American rights to the film, and released it theatrically on February 20, 2026. Blue Finch Film Releasing released the film digitally in the United Kingdom and Ireland on February 23.

== Reception ==
On the review aggregator website Rotten Tomatoes, 97% of 72 critics' reviews are positive, with an average rating of 7.8/10. The website's consensus reads: "Redux Redux detonates as a fiercely imaginative, nerve‑shredding multiverse thriller that channels grief and terror into a tightly controlled, emotionally searing story of loss and reckoning." On Metacritic, which uses a weighted average, the film holds a score of 72/100 based on seven critics, indicating "generally favorable" reviews.

=== Accolades ===
Award / Festival	Date of ceremony	Category	Recipient(s)	Result	Ref.
Sitges Film Festival	19 October 2025	Best Feature Film	Redux Redux	Nominated	
