= Chris Sheffield =

American actor (born 1988)

- Born: July 13, 1988 (age 38); Arlington, Texas, U.S.
- Occupation: Actor
- Years active: 2002–present

Christopher Sheffield (born July 13, 1988) is an American actor. He is best known for playing the role of Ben in The Maze Runner and Will Mason in The Last Ship.

== Filmography ==
=== Films ===
Year	Title	Role	Notes
2002	The Rookie	Snow Covered Catcher	
2010	Clear Blue	Simon	Short film
2011	Transformers: Dark of the Moon	Pimply Corporate Kid	
2012	General Education	Levi Collins	
2013	Playing Father	T.J. Harris	
2014	The Maze Runner	Ben	
2015	The Stanford Prison Experiment	Tom Thompson / Prisoner 2093	
2020	The Block Island Sound	Harry	

=== Television ===
Year	Title	Role	Notes
2009	Greek	Omega Chi Pledge	2 episodes
2010	NCIS: Naval Criminal Investigative Service	Vince	1 Episode
2011	Criminal Minds: Suspect Behavior	Shawn Meeks	1 Episode
2011	Brothers & Sisters	Young Brody	1 episode
2011	CSI: Miami	Travis Reeves	1 Episode
2013	Notes from Dad	T.J. Harris	TV movie
2014	Happyland	Noah Watson	4 episodes
2014	The Last Ship	Will Mason	8 episodes, recurring character
2015-2016	Aquarius	Walt Hodiak	11 episodes (seasons 1–2)
