= General Education =

- Theatrical release poster
- Directed by: Tom Morris
- Written by: Elliot Feld; Jaz Kalkat; Tom Morris
- Produced by: Elliot Feld; Jaz Kalkat; Tom Morris
- Starring: Chris Sheffield; Maiara Walsh; Elaine Hendrix; Bobby Campo; Janeane Garofalo; Larry Miller; Skylan Brooks
- Cinematography: Brooks Ludwick
- Edited by: Tyler MacIntyre
- Music by: T. J. Hill; Jesse Pruett
- Distributed by: Warner Bros.
- Release date: August 24, 2012
- Running time: 94 minutes
- Country: United States
- Language: English
- Budget: $500,000
- Box office: $8,601

General Education is a 2012 comedy film, directed by Tom Morris, starring Chris Sheffield, Maiara Walsh, Elaine Hendrix, Bobby Campo, Janeane Garofalo and Larry Miller and produced by Pelican House Productions. The film was shot in Chico and Gridley, California.

== Plot ==
Levi Collins, (Chris Sheffield), a high school senior, has been forced all his life by his father Rich, (Larry Miller), to play tennis due to a strong devotion to a family tradition. Levi receives a letter saying he has received a full scholarship to go to college at Forest Wood and play tennis, which makes his father very proud. In addition, Levi gets another letter from Arizona State saying he has been accepted, but his father discards it, encouraging him to go to Forest Wood.

On the day before graduation, Levi learns that he has failed Science class, which he refuses to tell his father about. After attempting to bribe his science teacher, Ms. Bradford, (Elaine Hendrix) with two tickets to his sister's mime show, he goes to the principal to seek help. Levi, with the help of his friend Charles, (Skylan Brooks), manages to trick the principal into letting him take part in the graduation ceremony so as to not anger his father, but his counselor Bebe, (Mercedes Masöhn), that because of his failing science, he cannot officially graduate. Levi then enrolls himself in a 10-day summer school program taught by his science teacher, and in doing so, has to cancel his trip to Mexico with his friends (Sean Przano & Harvey Guillén). Levi meets Katie, (Maiara Walsh), who says she is staying with her mother who is making her take the course. Samuel Goldstein, (Federico Dordei), tries to interfere, but after Levi knocks him out with a tetherball, he asks Katie out, and they go to see his sister's show. Levi picks her up and it is revealed that Katie's mother is Ms. Bradford.

Levi covers up the summer school by telling his parents he has been taking a summer job at the local rice cake factory, which his father does not take seriously. Levi is continually forced by his father to keep up with tennis, even at the risk of missing the class. Ms. Bradford informs him that the final project is due soon and Levi doesn't have a topic. His friend Shady Nick, (Seth Cassel), after showing him a video online, convinces Levi to create a project around turning his Mercedes into an alternative fuel car, which runs on vegetable oil. Nick's mechanic friend Sampson, (Sam Ayers), believes it may work. The three of them work on the car, and convert it to run on vegetable oil using a special filter. They try it and find that the project is a success, and Levi has his project. But after being forced by his father to practice for the upcoming Chico Open match against Samuel, Levi misses another day of school and is dropped from the class.

After another run-in with Samuel, who is revealed to have stolen Levi's car, he gets angry and smashes what he thinks is Samuel's truck, but it is revealed to be Officer Bob's truck, and Levi ends up in jail. His mom, (Janeane Garofalo), comes to get him and he explains the circumstances of his summer, and how he is not interested in tennis. His mother explains that the tradition in his family was started when his great-grandfather decided he wanted to leave his family's history of farming behind to pursue his dream, and tells Levi he should do the same. So with the help of Charles, Katie, and Nick, they retrieve Levi's car and try to help him get his car back to school to show Ms. Bradford before school ends. Levi confronts his father about his wish to not play tennis and asks for help, but he refuses.

Levi leaves, arrives at school, and asks Ms. Bradford to look at his project, and after his father, who has had a change of heart, talks to her she agrees to look at the car. He shows her the vegetable oil experiment, and Levi manages to pass the class. He finally decides to leave tennis behind and go to Arizona State, and Katie says she will be staying the whole summer.

== Cast ==
- Chris Sheffield as Levi Collins
- Maiara Walsh as Katie Bradford
- Elaine Hendrix as Ms. Bradford
- Bobby Campo as Brian Collins
- Tom Maden as Chad Worthington
- Seth Cassel as Shady Nick
- McKaley Miller as Emily Collins
- Mercedes Mason as Bebe Simmons
- Janeane Garofalo as Gale Collins
- Larry Miller as Rich Collins
- Skylan Brooks as Charles
- Federico Dordei as Samuel Goldstein
- Sean Przano as Dan
- Harvey Guillén as Andy
- Jimmy Wong as Bo Chang
- Jesse Pruett as Creepy Donut Buck

== Reception ==
The film gained unfavorable reviews. On Rotten Tomatoes, it scored a 0% approval rating based on 14 reviews. On Metacritic, the film received a rating of 20/100 from 5 critics.

Slant Magazine's Nick Schager only gave the film half a star, stating it is "too derivative to be amusing and too earnest to be parodic" and that the script has a "flatness that turns every plot point into a lesson in illogicality".

== Awards ==
Tom Morris won the Breakthrough FilmMaker Award at the 2012 Newport Beach Film Festival
