= Damon Miller =

- All My Children character
- Portrayed by: Finn Wittrock
- Duration: 2009–2011
- First appearance: October 30, 2009
- Last appearance: February 21, 2011
- Created by: Charles Pratt, Jr.
- Introduced by: Julie Hanan Carruthers
In-universe information
- Occupation: Student at University of California, Davis
- Family: Martin (adoptive)
- Parents: Tad Martin; Hillary Wilson
- Stepparents: Paul Miller (legal); Dixie Cooney
- Half-brothers: Jamie Martin
- Half-sisters: Kathy Martin; Jenny Martin
- Grandparents: Ray Gardner; Opal Cortlandt; Langley Wallingford; Phoebe Wallingford (step); Betty Wilson; Joe Martin (adoptive); Ruth Martin (adoptive); Henry Martin (great; adoptive); Kate Martin (great; adoptive)
- Uncles: Adrian Sword (half); Peter Cortlandt (half); Jeff Martin (half; adoptive); Phil Brent (half; adoptive); Bobby Martin (half; adoptive); Jake Martin (adoptive); Paul Martin (great; adoptive)
- Aunts: Jenny Gardner; Tara Martin (half; adoptive); Verla Grubbs (half); Amy Tyler (great; adoptive)
- First cousins: Josh Madden (half; adoptive); Charlie Brent (half; adoptive); Kelsey Jefferson (half; adoptive); Trevor Martin (adoptive); Beth Martin (once removed; adoptive); Phil Brent (once removed; adoptive); Sam Grey (once removed; adoptive)
- Other relatives: Charlie Brent

Damon Miller is a fictional character on the ABC daytime drama All My Children. He was portrayed by Finn Wittrock from October 30, 2009, to February 21, 2011. In February 2010, Wittrock was updated to contract status following the show's move from New York to Los Angeles. A long-lost member of the Martin family, Damon is the son of Tad Martin and his ex-wife Hillary Wilson (daughter of the late Langley Wallingford).

== Casting ==
Wittrock was initially expected to be on canvas for about only eight weeks. However, in December 2009, when it was announced that the series would move production to Los Angeles, the series offered Wittrock a contract not wanting to lose the recurring actor upon the move. In December 2010, it was reported that Wittrock had been released from his contract with the series. Soaps In Depth later confirmed with Wittrock himself that the rumors were true, his contract was set to expire and he would depart from the series. Though his final airdate was not initially available, Wittrock revealed that his character would air throughout the month of January 2011. Initial reports stated that the new head writers were unaware of what do with the character of Damon. However, contradicting information surfaced which stated that Wittrock chose not to renew his contract.

== Development ==
Damon's introduction puts Liza Colby (Jamie Luner)'s attempt to adopt baby Stuart in jeopardy as he is the child's biological father and he could influence Bailey's choice to let Bailey keep the child. Of the plot, head writer, Charles Pratt, Jr. said the storyline is "a very relatable and real situation."

== Storylines ==
Damon Miller arrived in Pine Valley as the biological father of Stuart Colby, who has been adopted by Liza Colby. Liza initially doesn't trust Damon, convinced that his renewed presence in the life of Bailey Wells, Stuart's biological mother, is only motivated by a desire to pursue a sexual relationship with her. Damon and Bailey eventually start to live life as family with Stuart, until Damon is accused of being the culprit behind a rash of break-ins in town, for which Bailey is hesitant to believe his innocence. With the stress of Damon's alleged involvement in the break-ins too much for her to handle, Bailey leaves town to be with her parents. Damon begins to get close to Liza's daughter, Colby Chandler, who believes in his innocence and subsequently gets him a job as a bartender at ConFusion. Damon gets word from Bailey that she has returned to Ohio and is staying with her parents. At the same time, the DNA test results confirm that Damon was the person doing the break-ins, but Liza gets him out of trouble again. Colby is furious when she learns of his lies, but the two eventually reconcile when her brother JR Chandler falls into a coma. He assures her that JR can hear her talking. He even gets tested to see if he is a potential bone marrow donor for him, but the results come back negative. Damon's boss later finds out that he was the one who broke in and fires him. Liza's boyfriend, Tad Martin then finds Damon sleeping on a stretcher at Pine Valley Hospital. Tad offers him a place to stay at his house, while Damon continues to show concern for Colby.

On March 11, 2010, when Damon goes to trial for his crimes, Liza learns that Damon's mother, Hillary Miller was supposed to come to town for the trial, but Hillary bails at the last minute leaving Liza wondering why. Liza finds out that Hillary Miller is actually Hillary Wilson, Tad's ex-wife. On March 17, it is confirmed by a DNA test that Tad is Damon's biological father. Meanwhile, Damon's antics get him into a lot of trouble. He takes Colby's car, this time with Colby inside and begins racing down the highway. He is texting Bailey at the same time and they crash into Brooke English. Her car is totaled but she is saved by surgery. Meanwhile, Damon needs surgery with Colby right by his side. Liza overhears Damon telling Colby he wants to be more than just friends. So she persuades his probation officer that jail is exactly what Damon needs. But later, Damon is later diagnosed with ADHD and the instead of sending him to prison, he is sent to therapy. On April 28, Paul shows up in Pine Valley, accusing Tad of harassing Hillary. Tad takes him to see Damon and they find him kissing Colby. Paul accuses Damon of seducing another girl and calls Colby a tramp before Tad makes him leave. Damon later overhears Liza confess to Colby that Damon is Tad's son. On May 4, Damon finally confronts Tad and he confirms that he is his father. Bailey calls Tad and informs him that Damon is not Stuart's father. On July 6, after he hugs Liza, he kisses her.

In November 2010, throughout the murder trial for David Hayward, Damon assists Liza as she is appointed the District Attorney.

On January 6, 2011, Damon spots Colby and Asher kissing. On January 7, Damon confronts both Colby and Asher. Later Damon confesses to Liza about what he saw and says he has to leave town. Just as he goes to leave Liza asks him not to leave and they hug before kissing and wind up having sex.

== Reception ==
Luke Kerr said that the writers should have explored a potential romance between Damon and Colby instead of firing Wittrock. Kerr then compared the pairing of Damon and Liza to the As the World Turns pairing of Casey (Billy Magnussen) and Emily (Kelley Menighan Hensley). Michael Fairman said he also saw great potential in Damon's romance with Liza. Jamey Giddens referred to Wittrock's portrayal of Damon as one of the best reasons to watch the show and described Damon's chemistry with Liza as "combustible."
