= Colby Chandler (All My Children) =

- All My Children character
- Natalie Hall as Colby Chandler
- Portrayed by: Kathryn Newton (2002–2004); Abby Wathen (2002); Ambyr Childers (2006–2008); Brianne Moncrief (2008–2009); Natalie Hall (2009–2011); Brooke Newton (2013); (and others)
- Duration: 1999–2004; 2006–2011; 2013
- First appearance: May 5, 1999
- Last appearance: September 2, 2013
- Created by: Megan McTavish
- Introduced by: Jean Dadario Burke (1999); Julie Hanan Carruthers (2006); Ginger Smith (2013)
In-universe information
- Other names: Colby Martin
- Occupation: Intern at Chandler Media's online talk show Talk Tempo; Former Student at Pine Valley University; Former Host of a video blog about relationships; Former Server at The Comeback; Shareholder in Chandler Enterprises
- Family: Chandler
- Parents: Adam Chandler; Liza Colby
- Half-brothers: JR Chandler; Miguel Reyes
- Half-sisters: Skye Chandler (legal); Hayley Vaughan; Anna Chandler
- Grandparents: Larry Colby; Marian Colby Chandler
- Aunts and uncles: Lottie Chandler; Stuart Chandler; Mia Saunders (half)
- Nieces and nephews: Lila Rae Alcazar (legal); Enzo Santos (half); AJ Chandler (half)
- First cousins: Ross Chandler; Scott Chandler (adoptive); William (half); Julie Rand Chandler (once removed; adoptive)

Colby Chandler is a fictional character from the original ABC Daytime soap opera All My Children. Born on-screen in 1999, the character was rapidly aged in 2006. The role has been recast several times, but most recently the role was portrayed by Natalie Hall from 2009 until the show's cancellation in 2011. When the show was relaunched as a web series to air on The Online Network owned and operated by production company, Prospect Park, Brooke Newton stepped into the role of Colby.

Colby is the daughter of Adam Chandler and Liza Colby, and heiress to the Chandler family fortune.

== Casting and creation ==
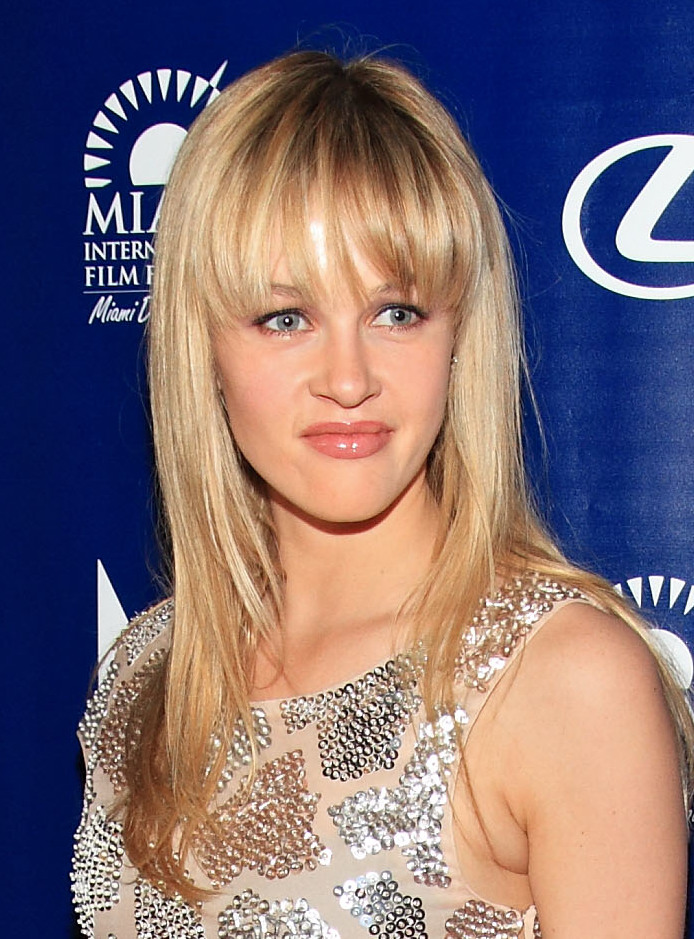
Actress Ambyr Childers was cast as Colby in 2006 when the character was rapidly aged; she remained in the role until her exit in 2008.

The role was originated first by Carson Weaver and Jordan Petruziello in May 1999 and later by Carson Grace Levine in January 2000. Later in 2000, Levine was replaced by twins Brianne and Morgan Mullan. Kathryn Newton appeared in the role from 2002 to 2004. Abby Wathen also appeared as a teenage Colby in a dream sequence in 2002. In May 2006, it was reported that Ambyr Childers had been cast in the role of a teenage Colby. Childers first appeared on July 3, 2006. Childers revealed that she auditioned for the role about month before her high school graduation. At time, she was taking finals, so she flew out to New York City for a screen test. She returned home for her graduation and them came returned to New York for several fittings and eventually started work. In the spring of 2008, rumors began to circulate that Childers the role of Colby was about to recast. An audition script for the role of "Edie" fed into the rumors. However, a spokesperson initially denied that Childers was departing from the series. In April 2008 it was officially announced that Childers had been released from her contract. Though Childers claimed that she had chosen to leave, other sources hinted that Childers was forced out. Childers made her last appearance on May 6, 2008, and was replaced by Brianne Moncrief on May 7. With the decision to move production of All My Children, several actors chose not to relocate to California. Though initial reports said that all contract cast members were offered a chance to relocate, another source said that ABC had misled the actors. Apparently Moncrief was one of the actors who never got the offer to go to California and she was fired from the role. Just days later, ABC announced that Natalie Hall had been cast in the role of Colby. Meanwhile, Moncrief made her last appearance on November 12, 2009 and Hall made her debut on November 25, 2009. Hall filmed her first scenes in mid October just before the show relocated to Los Angeles. Hall made her last appearance in the final network broadcast of All My Children on September 23, 2011. In April 2013, The Online Network launched a Tumblr page and posted a picture of a call sheet. Viewers could vaguely make out the name Brooke Newton in the role of Colby Chandler, but nothing was confirmed. Newton even attended the series premiere in late April and was photographed with Ryan Bittle who had recast the role of Colby's big brother JR Chandler. On May 6, the network officially confirmed through a mass press release that Newton had been cast in the role of Colby. Newton's first airdate was June 5, 2013.

== Development ==
In February 2006, rumors began to circulate that the 7-year-old Colby would be aged significantly. According to reports, Colby would be aged to 16 upon her return. However, the character's return would be anything but subtle. A "rebellious" Colby would cause trouble for her father Adam. Colby re-introduction mirrored that of her half-sister Hayley Vaughan (Kelly Ripa)'s debut in November 1990. In the summer of 2007, Colby develops a crush on the much older Josh Madden (Colin Egglesfield), despite his interest in her ex sister-in-law, Babe Carey (Alexa Havins). At the time when Babe interferes with Colby their "relationship," Colby is very emotional; "[Her] emotions are really being played with, and she has a lot on her plate right now with her family, with everything," Childers said in an interview. Colby is being pulled in so many different directions and it is "a lot for a young girl of the age of 16 to handle." Despite her own issues, Colby must act as a parent to her chaotic family. "I'm giving my own parents advice on what to do" the actress explained of Colby maturity while the adults in her life seemed to be acting like children. Upon Childers's departure, an executive was quoted in saying that "storyline dictated the change." Another source implied that age played a factor in the casting decision. Other sources revealed that Moncrief was hired so that the writers could age Colby making her the appropriate age for a romantic pairing with the 25-year-old Frankie Hubbard portrayed by Cornelius Smith, Jr. Colby had recently developed a crush on Frankie, and the two even shared a kiss. The potential pairing would also create drama based due to Adam's history as a schemer and Frankie's father Jesse Hubbard as the new chief of police. The writers' plans to capitalize on the chemistry between the two characters is abandoned as Moncrief's Colby does not share the same chemistry with Smith's Frankie. In the summer of 2008, Colby and her friends mistakenly believe that they are behind the death of Richie Novak (Billy Miller). Colby turns to alcohol prompting her brother, JR Chandler (Jacob Young) to point out that she may have a problem like many others in their family. However, the storyline fails to progress any further. When Natalie Hall stepped into the role, Hall said she believed that the writers wanted Colby to be more like her mother. Colby is meant to be "a person who is sweet, who is kind, and who will fight for what she wants." Colby is far from "weak" and according to Hall, "very complex." With Hall's debut, Colby becomes very manipulative. However, Hall stated that Colby would start to show a sweeter side when she starts to grow closer to bad boy, Damon Miller (Finn Wittrock). The character of Damon is the illegitimate son of Liza's high school boyfriend, Tad Martin (Michael E. Knight). In 2013, a press release described Newton's Colby as Adam's "spoiled and entitled." Jillian Bowe wondered if Newton's Colby would cause problems for Rob Wilson's Pete Cortlandt and his new love Celia Fitzgerald (Jordan Lane Price) due to Pete's past crush on Colby.

== Storylines ==
=== 1999–2004 ===
Colby was born to Liza Colby, who had decided to have a child via artificial insemination. Liza chose Dr. Jake Martin to be the sperm donor and the father of her child; but Liza's ex-husband, Adam Chandler was jealous of this arrangement and secretly had purchased the sperm bank, and substituted his own sperm donation for Jake's, therefore, making him Colby's biological father. At the time of Colby's birth, both Liza and Jake had believed that Jake was her father, therefore, the child was originally named "Colby Marian Martin". In 2000, when Jake had sued for custody of the child, it was revealed that Adam was actually Colby's biological father.

=== 2006–2011 ===
In 2006, a rebellious Colby Chandler, then incognito, shows up in Pine Valley. She steals a car and gets arrested, refusing to give the authorities her name. She makes a phone call and is revealed to be Adam Chandler's long-lost daughter, aged by several years. She ran away from her mother, Liza Colby after years in hiding.

Several years before, Liza had divorced Adam. Determined to save her daughter, Colby from Adam's nefarious ways that have "poisoned" the lives of his other children, she took Colby and went on the run. Colby has missed her father terribly and is now angry at Liza for banishing him from her life. Colby is now a spoiled brat, who plays on her father's guilt by demanding extravagant luxuries, such as a lavish Sweet Sixteen party, putting her at odds, with Adam's then wife, Krystal Carey.

During this lavish party, Colby had crashed her father's yacht and began a relationship, with Sean Montgomery. Soon after the party, she had a pregnancy scare. Her father and brother had found out, and had asked, who the father was. Although she knew Sean was the only possible father, she had claimed that, it could be Josh Madden to get back at Babe, who she had assumed was having an affair, with him.

On April 11, 2007, Colby had helped deliver Krystal's baby girl at the Chandler Mansion. On April 12, Krystal honored Colby by naming her daughter, "Jenny Colby Carey". On July 12, Krystal also had named Colby, Jenny's godmother. After Colby had learned that, Adam had paid Ava Benton to plant drugs on Sean, she had moved out of her father's mansion and had moved in, with her goddaughter Jenny, Krystal, and Tad Martin.

Colby is initially spoiled, selfish and hostile towards Krystal, and Babe, but her time in Pine Valley had changed her and she put the bulk of her bad behavior behind her, and had emerged a much kinder and generous person. In 2008, Sean and Colby broke up, because Sean had cheated on Colby, with Zach Slater's ex-lover, Hannah Nichols, who was much older than Sean. After the breakup, Sean had moved out of Pine Valley and is now very seldom mentioned.

Colby became fast friends with Cassandra Foster, who had recently moved to town from Paris to live, with her mother, Angela Hubbard. Colby had originally planned college to attend Wellesley College, but she had turned down her acceptance there in favor of Pine Valley University, hoping to stay close to her family. Around this time Colby and Dre had liked each other slightly, but it never blossomed into anything.

Colby had developed a requisite crush on the older, Frankie Hubbard, upon meeting him. Initially, Frankie was annoyed, by Colby, but came to love her as a little sister, during the time they were kidnapped together and almost killed. Frankie sees her as a "kid", and nixed a possible relationship between the two. Colby become quite intoxicated at her 18th birthday party. Dre was driving Colby's car, when he and Cassandra decided to bring her home. He ran over someone in the road, but was unable to determine what the object was, since it was nighttime.

The next day, upon learning that, Richie Novak had been struck by a car on the same road at approximately simultaneously, the three teenagers had feared that, they had inadvertently killed him. Unaware that, Richie had actually been murdered earlier that, evening, by his sister, Annie Lavery, the teens vowed to keep the entire incident a secret. It has, since been public knowledge that, Annie was the one who had killed Richie.

During the whole Richie incident, Pete Cortlandt started to hang around Colby and developed a crush on her. Initially, Colby had wanted nothing to do, with him, but after he was struck, by lightning, she had realized that, she did like him as a friend. They had remained friends for a well, although they had kissed on occasion and Pete, made it clear, he still had a crush on her.

Then after Petey's house burned down they began to date. Although she can sometimes act spoiled, Colby is mostly a sweet loyal girl, who is incredibly defensive of her friends and family. Although both Dre and Cassandra had moved away, she is still friends, with Ren and Corinna.

During the Richie storyline, Colby had a slight drinking problem that, had fizzled out around the time of the tornado that, had killed Babe. Colby now lives, with her father, her brother and her nephew. In May 2009, Colby's uncle, Stuart Chandler is accidentally shot. Although they end up finding out in the finale episode that, Stuart Chandler was alive and being held captive and taken care of, by Dr. David Hayward.

Adam and Stuart are identical twins so it is believed that, someone had assumed they were shooting Adam. It is later revealed that, Adam accidentally shot Stuart, because David Hayward is switching up his heart medications. Adam also marries Annie after she saves his life. Colby and her brother, JR constantly find ways to annoy her and get her out of the mansion.

In May 2009, Liza returns to town, with the news that, she is pregnant and supposedly give birth a son that, she had named after Colby's late uncle, Stuart. Colby later finds out that, Liza was never actually pregnant and that, Liza was supposed to adopt the son of Amanda Dillon to keep him away from David Hayward, who was believed to be the father. Amanda's husband, Jake switches Amanda's baby, with the newborn son of Bailey Wells and Damon Miller.

Colby later decides that, she wants to work things out, with her parents. Damon begins acting out and is accused of breaking, into houses around town, well Colby assumes he is innocent. Damon is, proven guilty and Colby is furious, with him. Meanwhile, JR is diagnosed with leukemia. He falls, into a short coma and Damon assures Colby that, JR is aware of everything that, is going on around him. Liza notices a closeness between Damon and Colby, and tries to keep them apart.

Damon takes Colby's car and she follows him, which leads to them getting, into a car accident, with Brooke English. Colby is okay, but Brooke and Damon need surgery. Liza overhears Damon admitting to Colby that, he wants to be more than just friends and tries to sabotage his chance of staying out of prison. But Damon is later diagnosed, with ADHD and sent to therapy instead.

The new boy in town Asher Pike saves her from falling from a railing at Chandler Enterprises. In 2011, she finds out that, her ex-boyfriend, Damon and her mother, Liza slept together and after finding out she had posted a video of herself ranting about what happened between Damon and her mother, Liza and the video went viral. She does not want anything to do, with her mother after she had found out. Colby had started to embrace the video after people appreciated her story and has, made more videos for a vlog on the internet. On August 31, 2011, Colby packs her stuff and leaves the Chandler mansion, and goes back to live, with Liza, due to JR blackmailing his ex-wife, and AJ's legal mother and biological aunt, Marissa Tasker, into giving him full custody and Colby is furious, so she packs and leaves.

=== 2013 ===
Colby returns to Pine Valley reverting to her old scheming manipulative ways. she tries to get some money from her father and when he refuses she sets her sights on Pete Cortlandt, which causes some tension between Pete and Celia. The two eventually break up and although Colby manages to get the loan from David Hayward she is able to seduce Pete and the two end up sleeping together.

== Reception ==
Childers's Colby was not immediately accepted by fans who grew tired of her "teen angst." However, once the writers toned down the writing, Childers was able to win over viewers and critics. TV Guide's Nelson Branco listed Childers as #6 on the list of Most Improved Actors in 2008. Branco applauded Childers for being able to hold her own with the show's veteran actors. Daytime Confidential also disapproved Childers's exit and applauded her for her performance. In a poll questioning fans about whether the recast was needed, 91% of voters also said Childers should have stayed in the role. When the writing began hinting at Colby developing an alcohol problem, some disapproved of the potential plot as it was what not they envisioned for the character of Colby. A Daytime Confidential article hoped that Colby would follow in the footsteps of her mother and grandmother, Liza Colby and Marian Chandler (Jennifer Bassey) and become a schemer to get what she wants. Upon Moncrief's ousting, Daytime Confidential recommended Marcy Rylan, known for her role as Lizzie Spaulding on Guiding Light for the a Colby recast. "Rylan was BORN to play Kelly Ripa's baby sister," said Jamey Giddens referencing Colby's connection to Ripa's Hayley Vaughan Santos.
