= 13 Cameras =

2016 film directed by Victor Zarcoff

- Film poster
- Directed by: Victor Zarcoff
- Screenplay by: Victor Zarcoff
- Produced by: Jim Cummings; Kevin McManus; Matthew McManus; Ethan Rosenberg; Tony Yacenda
- Starring: Neville Archambault; Sean Carrigan; PJ McCabe; Brianne Moncrief; Jim Cummings; Heidi Niedermeyer; Sarah Baldwin
- Cinematography: Jess Dunlap
- Edited by: Derek Desmond
- Music by: Paul Koch
- Production companies: 30 Bones Cinema; 79th & Broadway Entertainment
- Distributed by: 79th & Broadway Releasing
- Release date: April 15, 2016
- Running time: 87 minutes
- Country: United States
- Language: English

13 Cameras is a 2016 American crime horror thriller film written and directed by Victor Zarcoff. The film was originally titled Slumlord, before being renamed.

== Premise ==
"13 Cameras" is a suspenseful horror film that tells the story of a young couple, Ryan and Claire, who move into a new home in the suburbs. Little do they know that their landlord, a creepy and voyeuristic man named Gerald, has installed 13 hidden cameras throughout the house, which he uses to watch their every move.

== Cast ==
- Neville Archambault as Gerald
- Sean Carrigan as Camera Guy Joe
- PJ McCabe as Ryan
- Brianne Moncrief as Claire
- Jim Cummings as Paul
- Heidi Niedermeyer as Audrey
- Sarah Baldwin as Hannah
- Andy Gould as Zulu
- Ethan Rosenberg as Pet Store Clerk
- DeForrest Taylor as Officer
- Thomas Modifica Jr. as Officer
- Michaela McManus as Tenant
- Gabriel Daniels as Junior

== Critical reception ==
On Rotten Tomatoes the film has a 77% approval rating from critics based on 13 reviews. Dennis Harvey of Variety gave a positive review, writing that it "ratchets up a fair amount of suspense and intrigue" and declaring that it did "a good job building tension", while criticising the lack of characterisation given to the villain. Justin Lowe of The Hollywood Reporter gave a mixed review, declaring that it was somewhat suspenseful, while criticising its characterisation as shallow.

== Sequel ==
A sequel titled 14 Cameras was released in 2018.

== See also ==
- 1BR
- Hemet, or the Landlady Don't Drink Tea
- The Resident
