= Long Gone Gulch =

American animated short film

- Genre: Adventure; Fantasy; Western; Slapstick; Comedy
- Created by: Zach Bellissimo; Tara Billinger
- Written by: Zach Bellissimo; Tara Billinger; Karl Hadrika; Megan Ann Boyd
- Directed by: Zach Bellissimo; Tara Billinger
- Creative directors: Trevor Simonsen; Daniaelle Simonsen (Note: Both are listed as doing "art direction" and the page for creative director says "the creative director may also assume the roles of an art director, copywriter, or lead designer.")
- Voices of: E. G. Daily; Danny Cooksey; Amber Midthunder; Eric Bauza
- Theme music composer: Dom Kreep
- Composer: Dom Kreep (Note: In the pilot, J.D. Wilkes performed "Bible, Candle, & A Skull" in a scene in the saloon.)
- Country of origin: United States
- Original language: English
- No. of seasons: 1
- No. of episodes: 1

Production
- Executive producer: Erin Fitzgerald
- Producers: Zach Bellissimo; Tara Billinger
- Editor: Zach Bellissimo
- Running time: 22 minutes
- Production companies: Lopside Animation; MelonCollie Productions

Original release
- Network: YouTube
- Release: January 11, 2021

Long Gone Gulch is an American animated adventure-fantasy Western comedy short film created, directed, written and produced by Tara Billinger and Zach Bellissimo, based on a successful Kickstarter campaign in 2016. The short premiered on January 11, 2021 on YouTube. The beginning of the pilot has a content warning saying that the animation contains scenes with cartoon violence, images with flashes, and "scary content" not suitable for those under age 7.

In the film, the orphaned teenage girl Rawhide serves as a sheriff in The Gulch, employed by a jackalope mayor. Her slightly older male partner Snag is a thrill-seeking rocker who dislikes authority figures. The duo fall out of favor with their boss after a job gone wrong.

== Premise ==
Snag and Rawhide, sheriffs in a place known as "The Gulch", end up in trouble with the town's mayor after a job gone wrong, and have to fight for "what they care about most", while facing other weird and sleazy characters along the way.

== Characters ==
- Rawhide (voiced by E. G. Daily) is a 16-year-old human sheriff in the Gulch who is employed by the mayor and a friend of Snag, who is skilled with fighting, especially using her slingshot, and can think on her feet. Her father died under unknown circumstances and is buried not far outside the town. Her hair is always covering her left eye, and she enjoys collecting, sweets, and history, while disliking liars, villains, and varmints.
- Snag (voiced by Danny Cooksey) is another human sheriff in the town who is friends with Rawhide, uses a special comb as a weapon, and is 17 years old. He enjoys rock n' roll, thrill-seeking, and monster films, while he dislikes books, hard work, and authority.
- BW (voiced by Amber Midthunder) is a sardonic 21-year-old bounty hunter and Native American human who hangs around the saloon. She likes to mess with Rawhide and Snag. According to series creator Zach Bellissimo, the "BW" in her name does not mean anything. She is also older and taller than Rawhide and Snag.
- Squatch and Pinchley (both voiced by Piotr Michael) are the best friends of Rawhide and Snag. Squatch is a burnt-out sasquatch, while Pinchley is a happy and dimwitted humanoid cactus, and both hang about the local saloon.
- Mayor Rhubarb (voiced by Myke Chilian) is the neurotic and short-tempered mayor of The Gulch and is a jackalope of an old age. He employed Rawhide and Snag as sheriffs, but hates their guts.
- Marigold (voiced by Erin Fitzgerald) is the secretary of the mayor, who is another jackalope, the love interest of the Mayor Rhubarb, and was briefly persuaded easily to join Mako's gang because of the offer of "cheaper healthcare".
- Mako (voiced by Eric Bauza) is an outlaw and a land-walking shark (likely a mako shark) living in the Gulch who hates the sheriffs. He has four henchmen (also land-walking sea creatures) who work with him: Frisco the wolffish, Enzo the pink crab, Groggy the green crab, and Klaus the moray eel.

== Episodes ==
Season	Episodes	Originally released	Cumulative Views (millions)
Pilot		January 11, 2021	3.8

=== Pilot (2021) ===
No.	Title	Storyboarded by	Original release date
1	"Pilot" (Note: Not given a name other than "LONG GONE GULCH (Full Pilot Episode)")	Zach Bellissimo, Karl Hadrika, and Megan Ann Boyd	January 11, 2021
Snag and Rawhide, two sheriffs in The Gulch, after fighting off a series of thieves, are fired from their jobs by the town's mayor for their unorthodox methods. After going to a saloon, both resolve to fight for their jobs against a series of outlaws which threaten to take over the small town.

== Production and release ==
In 2015, the project was officially posted online, with the creators having worked with the show's concept since 2010. In 2016, a Kickstarter was begun for the series, and ran for five years after that point. The same year, a one-minute trailer was released. For that trailer, the art, character design, storyboarding, and animation, was divided between Tara Billinger and Zach Bellissimo, while Michael J. Ruocco did additional animation scenes, and Sam Mckenzie put together text and logo design. At the time, the goal was to release a pilot episode 8–11 minutes long, creating a western-themed show that wasn't a parody, which would appeal to those who like The Mighty Boosh, Mad Max, Alice in Wonderland, and The Good, the Bad and the Ugly. In June 2018, the official Tumblr for the show stated that programs such as Flash and Animate were used for the animation, independently producing, rather than through a studio. The pilot was planned for release in early 2019, but, in December 2019, the release date was pushed back to 2020.

On November 27, 2018, the official trailer for the series was first released on YouTube.

On January 11, 2021, the pilot for the series was released. The crew, headed by creators Zach Bellissimo and Tara Billinger, included animator Nigel, art directors Daniaelle and Trevor Simonsen, and writer Karl Handrika. Others on the crew included Trevor Von Klueg as technical director, Zach Bellissimo as animation director, Zach Bellissimo and Tara Billinger doing character design, Bryan Velayo and Louis Pieper engaging in composting, Bob Pepek as re-recording mixer, and Tara Billinger as production manager. The finished pilot expanded from the originally planned length of 8–11 minutes to 21 minutes.

In June 2021, J.D. Wilkes & the Legendary Shack Shakers presented their newest single, a cover of "Rawhide", which mixes animated scenes from the pilot and other public domain footage from Terror of Tiny Town. Wilkes had performed "Bible, Candle, & A Skull" in the pilot.

== Reception ==
The show's pilot was positively reviewed. Matthew Field of Go & Express, a South African newspaper, called the episode "light-hearted fun," saying that everything about it is great, with a strong cast, "superb" animation, and it is aimed at a "young audience," meaning it never goes above "PG levels," meaning that those of all ages can "enjoy the fun." Chris Perkins of Animation for Adults reviewed the series. In the review of the pilot, he described it as a "real treat for animation fans everywhere," with distinct and unique character designs, is inventive, and has strong visuals, adding that influences of the Mickey Mouse shorts and Rick and Morty can be seen in the series.

Lena Nikolaeva of the Russian television channel 2×2 reviewed the episode, stating that the two protagonists "complement each other perfectly," and argued that when watching the episode various times, viewers will find "something new and fun" everytime, with the pilot a "combination of serious themes...and hilarious scenes." Nikolaeva hoped that the episode will have a big effect and then be taken to bigger animation studios. Margaret Troup of the Iowa State Daily positively reviewed the pilot, giving it a rating of 8.5/10, calling it a "fast-paced, Western-style slapstick comedy and action," saying that fans and creators of the episode have hoped that a TV production studio would pick up the series like the case with Hazbin Hotel. She also noted that the series is more family-friendly than Helluva Boss or Hazbin Hotel, even though some swearing, blood, and cartoon violence makes it "mature enough for older audiences to enjoy in addition to children," and praised the pilot's animation, saying it is akin to Kim Possible and The Powerpuff Girls. The review also indicated that the voice acting of Daily, Cooksey, and Midthunder could all use improvement.
