= Bobby Campo =

American actor (born 1983)

- Born: Robert Joseph Camposecco; March 9, 1983 (age 43); Wheeling, West Virginia, U.S.
- Other name: Bobby Camposecco
- Occupation: Actor
- Years active: 2005–2022

Robert Joseph Camposecco, (born March 9, 1983) known professionally as Bobby Campo, is an American actor. Campo made his on-screen debut in the CBS television film Vampire Bats in 2005. He appeared in a supporting role in the teen comedy film Legally Blondes in 2009, and later received wide recognition for playing Nick O'Bannon in the supernatural horror film The Final Destination that same year.

Following his breakout, Campo starred in the comedy film General Education (2012) and had a main role as Ben on the YouTube web series Audrey (2012), as well as a recurring role as Max on the Syfy supernatural television series Being Human (2013). In the mid-to-late 2010s, Campo had a recurring role as Seth Branson on season 1 of the MTV anthology slasher series Scream (2015–2016) and starred in the Christian drama film Unbroken: Path to Redemption (2018).

== Life and career ==
Campo was born in Wheeling, West Virginia, and raised in St. Petersburg, Florida. His father, Italian-American Robert Camposecco, works as a painting contractor while his mother, Donna (née Wells), is a make-up artist who has worked for various celebrities. His paternal grandfather, Bob Campo, was a former radio personality in Wheeling and he has a younger sister named Julia Marie who is married to Stephen Christian of the band Anberlin. Campo is an alumnus of Seminole High School and was a student at the Performers Studio Workshop in Tampa, Florida.

In October 2009, he appeared on the cover of Throne Magazine and was featured in the March 2010 issue of L'Uomo Vogue.

Campo was featured in several short films including Queen (2011) and Patti (2012), and in A Conversation About Cheating with My Time Travelling Future Self (2012). In 2012, he was cast in a recurring role in the third season of the supernatural drama TV series Being Human, playing the character of the mortician, Max.

In March 2015, he was cast in the role of Seth Branson in MTV's slasher television series Scream. He appeared in three Hallmark Channel's films: My Christmas Love (2016), Sharing Christmas (2017), and Christmas Camp (2019). Also in 2019, he was in Unbroken: Path to Redemption; that followed his portrayal of Gene Kelly in The Maestro. Campo was last seen in 2022's Vanished: Searching for My Sister.

== Filmography ==
=== Film ===
Year	Title	Role	Notes
2006	99	Yentle	
2009	Coffee & Cream	Son	Short film
2009	Legally Blondes	Chris Lopez	Direct-to-video
2009	The Final Destination	Nick O'Bannon	
2011	Séance: The Summoning	Joey	
2011	Queen	Jesse	Short film
2012	Patti	Interviewer (voice)	Short film
2012	A Conversation About Cheating with My Time Travelling Future Self	Stan	Short film
2012	General Education	Brian Collins	
2014	The Jazz Funeral	Billy	
2014	Starve	Beck	
2018	The Maestro	Gene Kelly	
2018	Unbroken: Path to Redemption	Pete Zamperini	

=== Television ===
Year	Title	Role	Notes
2005	Vampire Bats	Don	Television film (credited as Bobby Camposecco)
2006	South Beach	Steven	Episode: "Who Do You Trust"
2008	Greek	Trent	2 episodes
2009	Mental	Matt	Episode: "House of Mirrors"
2009	Law & Order: Special Victims Unit	Parker Hubbard	Episode: "Solitary"
2009	CSI: Miami	Ethan Durant	Episode: "Bad Seed"
2011	Love's Christmas Journey	Erik Johnson	Hallmark Channel Television film
2012	Audrey	Ben/Ian	Web series; 6 episodes
2013	Being Human	Max	6 episodes
2013	Justified	Yolo	Episode: "Decoy"
2013	Grey's Anatomy	Brian	2 episodes
2013	Masters of Sex	Carl	Episode: "Standard Deviation"
2013	Snow Bride	Jared Tannenhill	Hallmark Channel Television film
2013	TMI Hollywood	Various	Episode: TMI's First Anniversary Show
2015	CSI: Crime Scene Investigation	Damon Harlow	Episode: "Merchants of Menace"
2015–16	Scream	Seth Branson	11 episodes
2016	Atomic Shark	Kaplan	Syfy Television film
2016	My Christmas Love	Liam	Hallmark Channel Television film
2017	Sharing Christmas	Michael	Hallmark Channel Television film
2018	Criminal Minds	Wick Rollins	Episode: "The Dance of Love"
2018	Nightmare Shark	Kaplan	Syfy Television film
2019	Christmas Camp	Jeff	Hallmark Channel Television film
2022	Vanished: Searching for My Sister	Gary	Television film
