= Amber Midthunder =

Native American actress (born 1997)

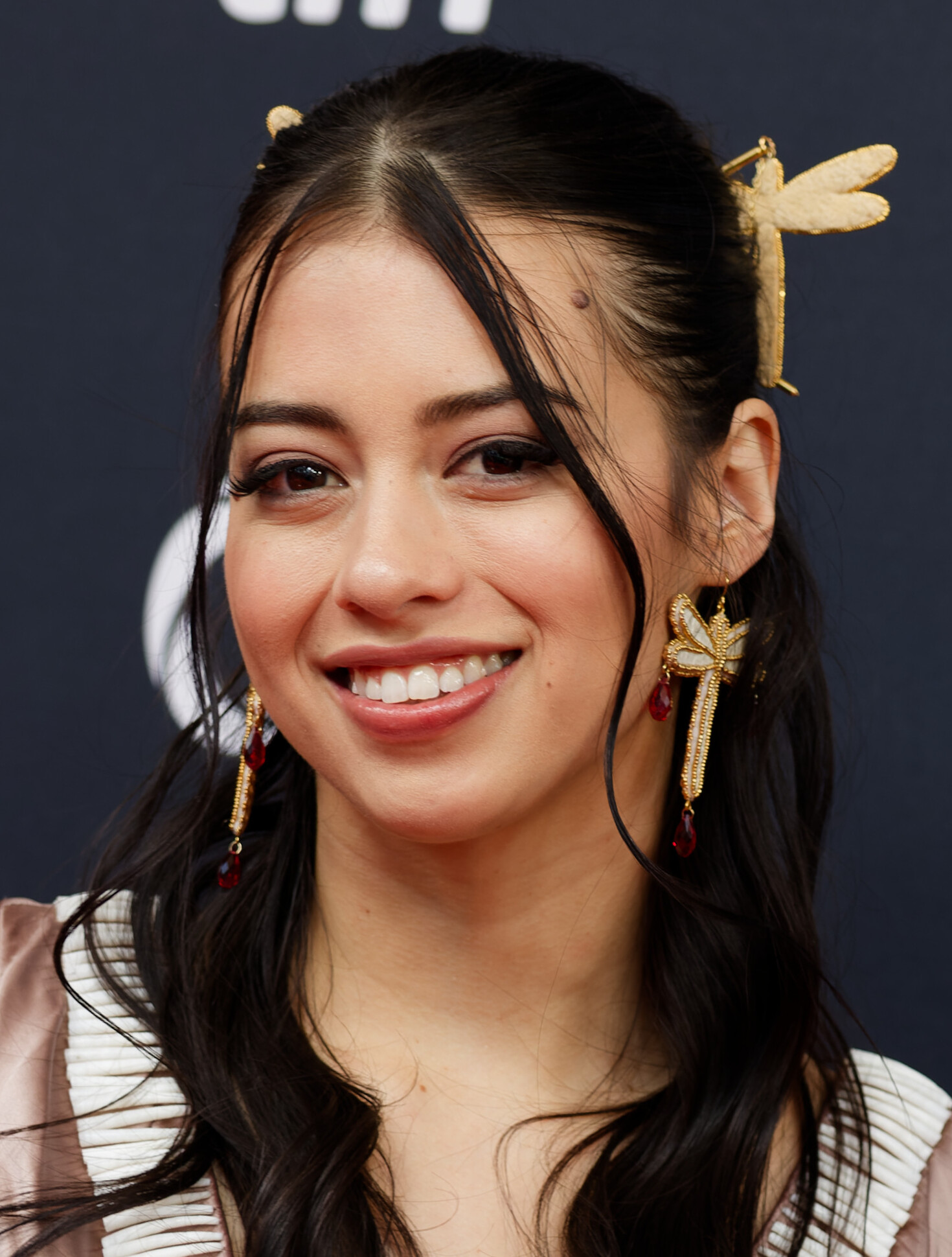
- Midthunder in 2024
- Born: Amber Thunder Rose Midthunder; April 26, 1997 (age 29); Shiprock, New Mexico, U.S.
- Occupation: Actress
- Years active: 2001–present

Amber Thunder Rose Midthunder (born April 26, 1997) is an American actress. She is known for her roles in the television series Legion (2017–2019), Roswell, New Mexico (2019), Reservation Dogs (2021), Avatar: The Last Airbender (2024), Carrie (portraying Rita Desjardin) and Monarch: Legacy of Monsters (both 2026), and in the films Prey (2022), Opus, and Novocaine (both 2025).

== Early life ==
Amber Thunder Rose Midthunder was born on April 26, 1997 in Shiprock, New Mexico. Her mother Angelique, who is originally from Thailand and of Thai-Chinese ancestry, is a casting director and stunt performer, and her father David is an actor of Hunkpapa Lakota, Sisseton Dakota, and Sahiyaiyeskabi Assiniboine descent; Angelique and David met while working on the 1995 Japanese film East Meets West.

Midthunder is a citizen of the Fort Peck Assiniboine and Sioux Tribe. She was born on the Navajo Nation in Shiprock, New Mexico, and eventually returned there after spending much of her childhood in Santa Fe where she attended the Academy for Technology and the Classics and where her mother worked in a casting firm.

Midthunder developed an interest in acting as a child. She would memorize and recite lines from her favorite shows. But she disliked her first experience in the job, leading her to take some time before another performance. She even considered a career in make-up, where she worked as an intern, or mixed martial arts, having trained and taught Brazilian jiu-jitsu.

== Career ==
Her first acting credit was a small role in 2008's Sunshine Cleaning. Midthunder worked in various productions filmed in New Mexico, then moved to Los Angeles at the age of 17 to pursue more acting opportunities.

She played a hotshot trucker in the 2021 Liam Neeson thriller The Ice Road.

In 2022, Midthunder starred in Prey, the fifth installment of the Predator franchise. She played Naru, a young Comanche healer who wants to prove herself as a hunter, and was widely praised for her performance. Prey was the first feature film to have a full Comanche language dub, and the first Hollywood franchise film to have an all-Native American cast. Midthunder received the Breakthrough Performance Award as part of the Saturn Awards, and a Critics' Choice Awards nomination for Best Actress in a Limited Series or Movie Made for Television, both for her performance in Prey.

In 2025, Midthunder co-starred in the action-comedy Novocaine and the thriller Opus.

== Filmography ==
=== Film ===
Year	Title	Role	Notes	Ref.
2001	The Homecoming of Jimmy Whitecloud	Little Girl		
2002	Deadly Species	Calusa Tribe	Direct-to-video film	
2008	Sunshine Cleaning	Candy Store Girl		
2008	Swing Vote	Female Student #3		
2009	Not Forgotten	Amaya Bishop (young)		
2014	Drunktown's Finest	Model #1		
2015	Spare Parts	Nikki		
2015	Bare	Malya	Uncredited	
2016	Hell or High Water	Natalie Martinez (bank teller)		
2016	Priceless	Maria		
2018	14 Cameras	Danielle		
2019	Only Mine	Julie Dillon	Direct-to-video film	
2019	She's Missing	Honey		
2020	Centurion: The Dancing Stallion	Elissa Hall		
2021	The Marksman	Gas Station Clerk		
2021	The Ice Road	Tantoo		
2021	The Wheel	Albee	Co-producer	
2022	Prey	Naru		
2023	Dream Scenario	Haley		
2024	Rez Ball	Dezbah Weaver		
2025	Opus	Belle		
2025	Novocaine	Sherry Margrave		
2026	How We Stand †			
TBA	Painter †	TBA	Filming	
TBA	Rot †	TBA	Pre-production	

Key
†	Denotes films that have not yet been released

=== Television ===
Year	Title	Role	Notes	Ref.
2012–2014	Longmire	Lilly Stillwater	Episodes: "Pilot", "Miss Cheyenne"	
2014	Banshee	Lana Cleary	Episodes: "The Warrior Class", "Bloodlines"	
2015	Dig	Starlet	Episode: "Emma Wilson's Father"	
2016	The Originals	Kayla McInnis	Episode: "Alone with Everybody"	
2017–2019	Legion	Kerry Loudermilk	Main role	
2018	The Misadventures of Psyche & Me	Lizzie	Television miniseries	
2019–2022	Roswell, New Mexico	Rosa Ortecho	Recurring role (season 1); main role (seasons 2–4)	
2021	Long Gone Gulch	BW	Voice role	
2022	Reservation Dogs	MissM8tri@rch	Episode: "Decolonativization"	
2024	Avatar: The Last Airbender	Princess Yue	3 episodes	
2026–present	Monarch: Legacy of Monsters	Isabel Simmons	Recurring role (season 2)	
2026	Carrie	Rita Desjardin	Main role; 7 episodes (season 1)	
