= Natalie Hall =

Canadian actress and singer

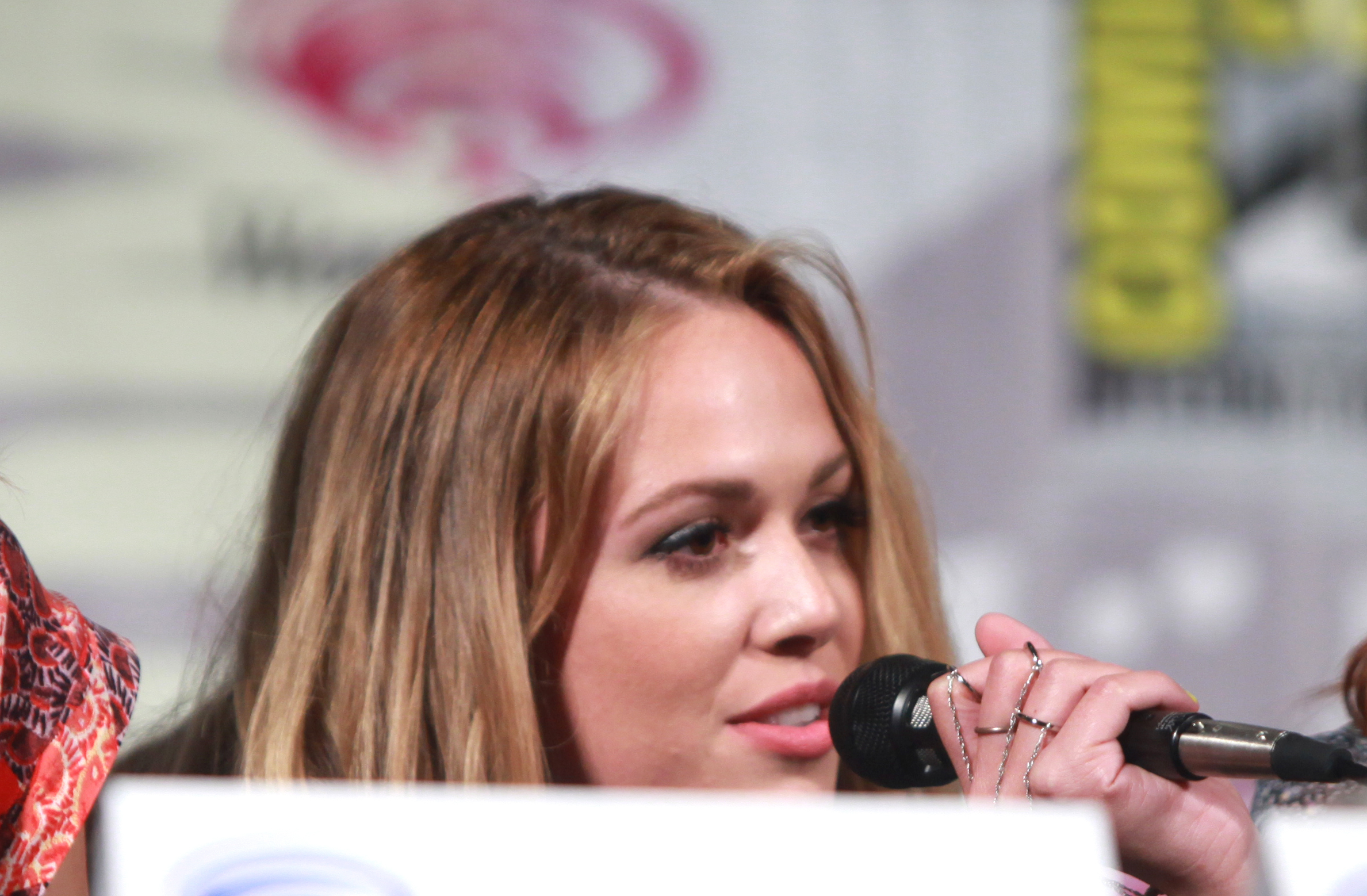
- Hall at the 2014 WonderCon
- Born: Natalie Elise Melinda Hall; Vancouver, British Columbia, Canada
- Occupation: Actress
- Years active: 2004–present
- Notable work: All My Children
- Spouse: Jack H. Robbins (m. 2017)
- Children: 2

Natalie Elise Melinda Hall is a Canadian actress. She has appeared in various Broadway, film and TV productions. One of her first TV appearances was when she portrayed the role of Colby Chandler on the soap opera All My Children from 2009 to 2011. Hall appeared opposite Miles Teller, Josh Brolin and Jeff Bridges in the 2017 film Only the Brave.

== Early life ==
Hall grew up in Vancouver, British Columbia. Her mother was a ballerina. Hall grew up with two brothers, of which she has said "I grew up loving the arts but I also was such a tomboy, I loved sports and was very competitive." She grew up playing soccer on an all-boys soccer team. Hall played the leading role in a community theatre production of Annie. She earned a first place representing British Columbia in a national singing competition. Hall was trained at the London Academy of Ballet and graduated with honors of distinction in dance when she was sixteen.

== Career ==
Hall initially moved to New York City. She performed as Val in a national touring production of A Chorus Line. Hall says about her first role, "It was an amazing experience. I had to grow up so fast working with such talent on a big stage". Her portrayal of Val earned a nomination for an Ovation award.

=== Acting ===
ABC announced that Hall had been cast in the role of Colby Chandler in the soap All My Children. Hall made her debut on November 25, 2009. Hall filmed her first scenes in mid October just before the show relocated to Los Angeles. She relocated to Los Angeles in 2010. Hall made her last appearance in the final network broadcast of All My Children on September 23, 2011.

On June 29, 2011, it was announced that Hall would be replacing Natalie Floyd as Hanna's soon-to-be stepsister, Kate Randall, in the ABC Family series Pretty Little Liars, playing the role until 2012. She played Ellie King née Davis, in Love's Christmas Journey, a four-part mini-series in 2011.

In 2013, she was cast as Taylor in The CW series Star-Crossed. Hall described her character as the "Queen Bee with a big heart" and a risk-taker in love. Hall played Britney in the series revival of Lifetime comedy drama Drop Dead Diva originally for two episodes however came back for another episode. Hall joined the cast of HBO's True Blood for its final season, appearing as resident villain Sarah Newlin's (Anna Camp) vampire sister, Amber Mills, for three episodes. She appeared on the cover of the Canadian fashion magazine Fave.

Hall guest starred in USA Network medical comedy-drama Royal Pains as Hope, a burlesque dancer who turns to Jeremiah for help when she begins experiencing pain during her act. Hall is also a member of the Prestigious "Actors Studio" in New York. Hall was most recently cast in the upcoming untitled Marc Cherry ABC pilot. Natalie Hall was seen in UnREAL season four on Lifetime. Also, in the CW series Charmed playing Lucy.

=== Music ===
Hall performs in various musicals in New York. In the film Rising Stars, Hall performed "Better with You", the music video for the song featuring Hall was later released. She was also featured in the song "Free To Fall" which also appeared in the film and the official soundtrack. Hall performed "Hallelujah I Love Her So" by Ray Charles at the "It Gets Better Project's "A Better Holiday" concert benefiting The Ali Forney Center on December 16, 2012.

== Personal life ==
On July 1, 2017, Hall married Jack H. Robbins; a U.S. Marine who formerly served on active duty. In May 2021, Hall announced that they had welcomed their first child, a son. In May 2023, Hall revealed that they had welcomed their second son.

== Filmography ==
=== Film ===
| Year | Title | Role | Notes |
|---|---|---|---|
| 2004 | Have You Heard? Secret Central | Tes Taylor | |
| 2010 | Rising Stars | Brenna | |
| 2013 | +1 | Melanie | |
| 2015 | Lucky N#mbr | Nikki Page | |
| 2015 | Simple Little Lives | Kaylee | |
| 2016 | The Curse of Sleeping Beauty | Linda Coleman | |
| 2016 | Summer of 8 | Jen | |
| 2017 | The Boy Downstairs | Ivy | |
| 2017 | Only the Brave | Natalie Johnson | |
| 2019 | A Nasty Piece of Work | Missy | |
| 2020 | Midnight at the Magnolia | Maggie Quinn | |

=== Television ===
| Year | Title | Role | Notes |
|---|---|---|---|
| 2008 | Law & Order: Special Victims Unit | Shelby Crawford | Episode: "Streetwise" |
| 2009 | The Good Wife | Maura | Episode: "Stripped" |
| 2009–11 | All My Children | Colby Chandler | Role held: November 25, 2009 – September 23, 2011 |
| 2011–12 | Pretty Little Liars | Kate Randall | Recurring role (season 2); 5 episodes |
| 2011 | Love's Christmas Journey | Ellie Davis King | Television film |
| 2012 | The Seven Year Hitch | Jennifer | Television film |
| 2013 | CSI: Crime Scene Investigation | Katy Hill | Episode: "Last Woman Standing" |
| 2013 | Drop Dead Diva | Britney | 3 episodes |
| 2014 | Star-Crossed | Taylor Beecham | Main role; 11 episodes |
| 2014 | Royal Pains | Hope | Episode: "Everybody Loves Ray, Man" |
| 2014 | True Blood | Amber Mills | 3 episodes |
| 2014 | Royal Pains | Tasha | Episode: "Electric Youth" |
| 2017 | Shades of Blue | Bianci's Girlfriend | 3 episodes |
| 2017 | NCIS: New Orleans | Chloe Myles | Episode: "Acceptable Loss" |
| 2018 | Unreal | Candy Coco | 8 episodes |
| 2018–19 | Charmed | Lucy | Recurring role, season 1 |
| 2019 | A Winter Princess | Carly / Princess Carlotta | Television film (Hallmark) |
| 2020 | You're Bacon Me Crazy | Cleo Morelli | Television film (Hallmark Channel) |
| 2020 | Sincerely, Yours, Truly | Hayley Hammond | Television film |
| 2020 | A Very Charming Christmas Town | Aubrey Lang | Television film (Lifetime Channel) |
| 2021 | Fit for a Prince | Cindy | Television film (Hallmark) |
| 2022 | Stalked by a Prince | Alyssa Banks | Television film (Lifetime Channel) |
| 2022 | Road Trip Romance | Megan Miller | Television film (Hallmark) |
| 2022 | Fly Away with Me | Angie | Television film (Hallmark) |
| 2022 | Noel Next Door | Noel | Television film (Hallmark) |
