= Brianne Moncrief =

American soap opera actress (born 1983)

- Years active: 2007–present

Brianne Moncrief is an American soap opera actress. She was best known for the role of Colby Chandler on All My Children.

The role of Colby Chandler on All My Children was Moncrief's first television job as a series regular, and she was hired to replace actress Ambyr Childers, who had originated the role. She first aired on May 7, 2008, but her contract was not picked up in November 2009.

== Filmography ==
- The Sopranos (episode "Walk Like a Man") (2007) as Lover #2
- All My Children (May 7, 2008 – November 2009) Colby Chandler
- Skeeball (2009) as Claire
- The Other Guys (2010) as Ershon's Assistant
- The Talk Man (2011) as Bree
- How We Got Away with It (2014) as Elizabeth
- 13 Cameras (2015) as Claire
- 14 Cameras (2018) as Claire
- 15 Cameras (2023) as Claire
