= Kevin McManus (filmmaker) =

American filmmaker

- Born: Warwick, Rhode Island, U.S.
- Education: Emerson College (BFA)
- Occupations: Director, producer, writer, editor
- Years active: 2012–present
- Relatives: Matthew McManus (brother); Michaela McManus (sister)

Kevin McManus is an American filmmaker and television writer. He is known for writing and directing the 2021 film The Block Island Sound, as well as the 2012 South By Southwest official selection Funeral Kings. He regularly works with his brother, Matthew McManus.

He is also known for writing and producing episodes of the Netflix series American Vandal and Cobra Kai. For his work on American Vandal, McManus was nominated for an Emmy Award for Outstanding Writing in a Limited Series or TV Movie and won a Peabody Award.

== Career ==
McManus's first feature film, Funeral Kings premiered in March 2012 at the South By Southwest Film Festival. He then went on to produce the horror feature film 13 Cameras which earned a New York Times Critic's Pick.

Most recently, McManus wrote, produced and directed the film The Block Island Sound which was released on Netflix in March 2021 where it hit the Top Ten films within its first week on the platform.

== American Vandal ==
McManus was a writer and producer on both Season 1 and Season 2 of American Vandal. The series was Netflix's most binge-watched show of 2017. On April 19, 2018, American Vandal won a 2017 Peabody Award for Entertainment. In July 2018, it was nominated for a Primetime Emmy Award.

== Select filmography ==
Year	Film	Director	Writer	Producer	Notes
2012	Funeral Kings	Yes	Yes	Yes	Feature directorial debut
2015	13 Cameras			Yes	
2018	14 Cameras			Yes	
2021	The Block Island Sound	Yes	Yes	Yes	
2025	Redux Redux	Yes	Yes	Yes	

== Personal life ==
He is the brother of filmmaker Matthew McManus and actress Michaela McManus.
