= 14 Cameras =

- Directed by: Seth Fuller; Scott Hussion
- Written by: Victor Zarcoff
- Produced by: Seth Fuller; Scott Hussion
- Starring: Neville Archambault
- Cinematography: Seth Fuller
- Music by: Paul Koch
- Production companies: 30 Bones Cinema; Hood River Entertainment
- Distributed by: Gravitas Ventures
- Release date: July 27, 2018
- Running time: 90 minutes
- Country: United States
- Language: English

14 Cameras is a 2018 American crime horror thriller film written by Victor Zarcoff, directed by Seth Fuller and Scott Hussion and starring Neville Archambault. It is the sequel to the 2016 film 13 Cameras.

== Cast ==
- Neville Archambault as Gerald
- Amber Midthunder as Danielle
- Brianne Moncrief as Claire
- Chelsea Edmundson as Sarah
- John-Paul Howard as Kyle
- Hank Rogerson as Arthur
- Gavin White as Junior
- Brytnee Ratledge as Molly
- Lora Martinez-Cunningham as Lori
- Tait Fletcher as Gargoyle

== Release ==
The film was released on July 27, 2018.

== Reception ==
The film has a 22% rating on Rotten Tomatoes based on nine reviews.

Frank Scheck of The Hollywood Reporter gave the film a negative review and wrote, "Voyeurism has never been so boring."

Nick Rocco Scalia of Film Threat rated the film a 5 out of 10 and wrote, "A lot of 14 Cameras‘ shortcomings can be at least partially attributed to screenwriter Victor Zarcoff, who both wrote and directed the previous film. This one is largely plotless, and the script fails to develop any memorable or sympathetic characters..."

Noel Murray of the Los Angeles Times also gave the film a negative review, calling it "a tedious exploitation picture not even sleazy enough to find offensive."

Adam Graham of The Detroit News graded the film a D and wrote, "14 Cameras is simply a perv fantasy pretending to be something more than the icky piece of filmmaking that it is."

== Sequel ==
A sequel titled 15 Cameras was released on October 13, 2023 without Neville Archambault, who died in 2022.
