= Michaela McManus =

American actress (born 1983)

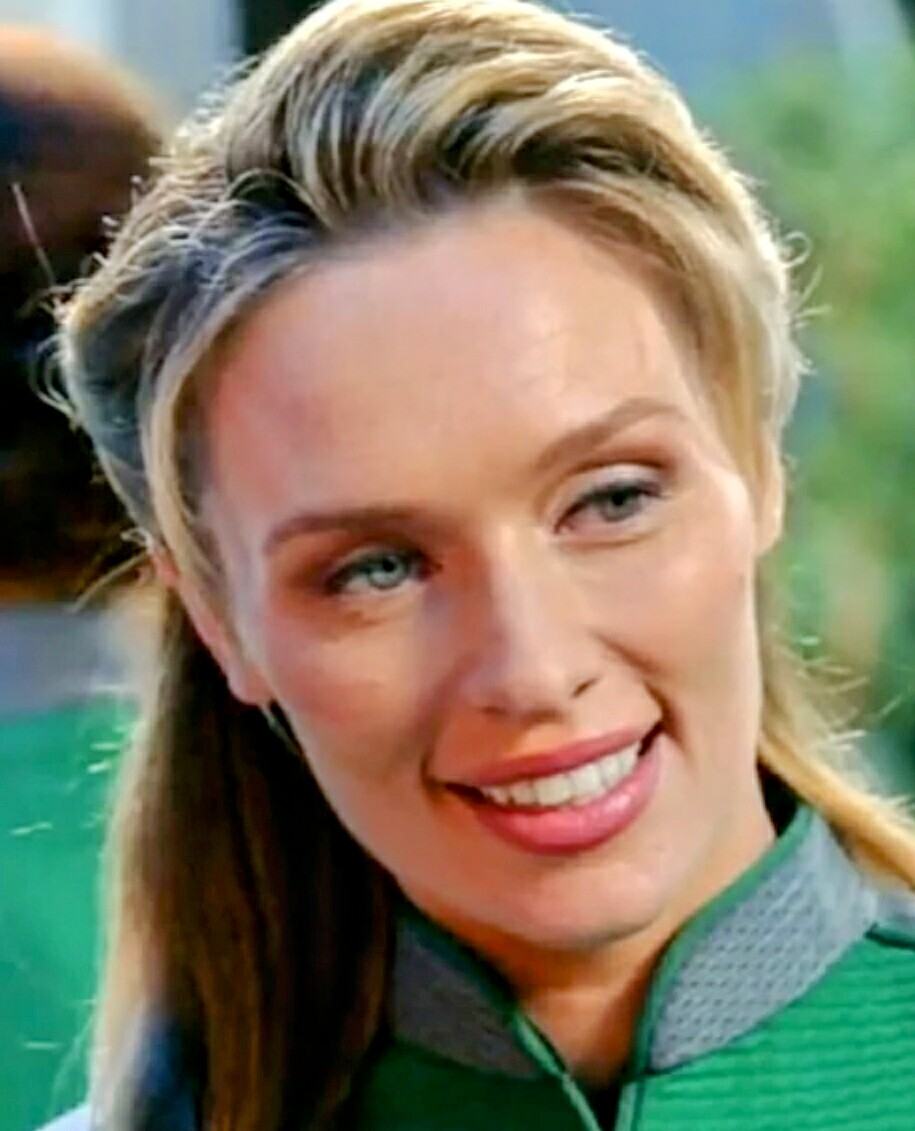
- McManus in The Orville (2018)
- Born: May 20, 1983 (age 43)
- Occupation: Actress
- Years active: 2006–present
- Spouse: Mike Daniels (m. 2011)
- Children: 3
- Relatives: Kevin McManus (brother); Matthew McManus (brother)

Michaela McManus (born May 20, 1983) is an American actress, known for her portrayals of Lindsey Strauss on One Tree Hill, Assistant District Attorney Kim Greylek on Law & Order: Special Victims Unit, and Grace Karn on the NBC drama Aquarius.

== Career ==
In 2008, she joined the cast of season five of One Tree Hill playing Lindsey Strauss, the love interest of Lucas Scott (Chad Michael Murray). After completing her work on One Tree Hill, she booked a guest role on season five of CSI: NY. She was subsequently announced as joining the cast of season ten of Law & Order: Special Victims Unit as Assistant District Attorney Kim Greylek. She was abruptly written out of SVU in the middle of season ten in which ADA Alexandra Cabot (Stephanie March) returned. However, McManus continued to be credited in season ten's main titles, and it was later confirmed that McManus would not be returning to SVU.

Since then, she has had guest roles in prime time shows such as Castle, CSI: Miami, The Vampire Diaries, and Hawaii Five-0. She also appeared in the music video "Glad You Came" by The Wanted. She starred as Tara on the NBC series Awake in 2012, and as Grace Karn on Aquarius in 2015. In 2017, McManus had supporting roles in SEAL Team as Alana Hayes, and The Orville as the Krill Teleya. She appeared in the short lived NBC series The Village as Sarah Campbell in 2019.

In November 2020, McManus was cast in a recurring role on the third season of the Netflix psychological thriller series You.

Starting September 2025, McManus appeared in season one of the Fox Television series Memory of a Killer in the recurring role of Nicky.

== Personal life ==
McManus married writer/producer Mike Daniels on June 3, 2011.

She is the sister of filmmakers Kevin and Matthew McManus.

== Filmography ==
=== Film ===
Year	Title	Role	Notes
2006	Cosa Bella	Bartender's Wife	Short film
2006	The Beautiful Lie		Short film
2011	About Fifty	Alix	
2011	Café	Movie Woman	Video
2012	Funeral Kings	Patricia Gilmour	
2015	Into the Grizzly Maze	Kaley	Known as Red Machine
2016	Love Finds You in Valentine	Kennedy Blaine	
2020	The Block Island Sound	Audry	
2025	Redux Redux	Irene Kelly	Aka Find. Kill. Repeat

=== Television ===
Year	Title	Role	Notes
2008	One Tree Hill	Lindsey Strauss	Recurring role, 17 episodes
2008	CSI: NY	Susan Montgomery	Episode: "Turbulence"
2008–2009	Law & Order: Special Victims Unit	Kim Greylek	Main role (season 10), 22 episodes
2009	Castle	Scarlett Price	Episode: "Love Me Dead"
2009	CSI: Miami	Caroline Berston	Episode: "Kill Clause"
2010	Nomads	Donna	TV film
2010–2011	The Vampire Diaries	Jules	Recurring role, 6 episodes
2011	Hawaii Five-0	DA Roberts	Episode: "E Malama"
2012	Awake	Tara	Main role, 13 episodes
2012–2013	Necessary Roughness	Noelle Sarris	4 episodes
2013	CSI: Crime Scene Investigation	Kelly Nivens	Episode: "Dead of the Class"
2015	13 Cameras	Tenant	TV film
2015–2016	Aquarius	Grace Karn	Main role, 21 episodes
2017	Threadbare	Chloe	Episode: "Six"
2017–2018, 2022	SEAL Team	Alana Hayes	Recurring role, 11 episodes
2017–2022	The Orville	Teleya / Janel Tyler	5 episodes
2018	The Magicians	Callie	Episode: "Will You Play with Me?"
2019	The Village	Sarah	Main role, 10 episodes
2021	You	Natalie Engler	3 episodes
2023–2025	9-1-1: Lone Star	Kendra Harrington	Recurring role, 4 episodes
2026	Memory of a Killer	Nikki	Recurring role, 7 episodes
2026	Ted	Charlotte Robicheck	Episode: "Mrs. Robicheck"
