= Funeral Kings =

- Film poster
- Directed by: Kevin McManus; Matthew McManus
- Written by: Kevin McManus; Matthew McManus
- Produced by: Kevin McManus; Matthew McManus; Michael J. McGarry; Ethan Rosenberg; Tony Yacenda; Dan Perrault; Brian Vannucci; Jordan Rudman; Andrew van den Houten
- Starring: Dylan Hartigan; Alex Maizus; Jordan Puzzo; Charles Odei; Michaela McManus; Kevin Corrigan
- Cinematography: Alex Disenhof
- Edited by: Nate Cormier
- Music by: Darien Scott Shulman
- Production company: 30 Bones Cinema
- Distributed by: Freestyle Releasing
- Release dates: March 10, 2012 (South by Southwest); November 16, 2012
- Running time: 85 minutes
- Country: United States
- Language: English

Funeral Kings is a 2012 film written and directed by Kevin McManus and Matthew McManus starring Dylan Hartigan and Alex Maizus.

== Plot ==
Two irreverent altar boys, Andy and Charlie, play hooky after every funeral they serve at their school's chapel. One night their friend Bobby drops a trunk to Andy's house to hide out there for period of time. Later they are told at a funeral that Bobby has been expelled and he is being replaced by David. David is nothing like Andy and Charlie but the pair befriend him. Charlie starts holding a grudge on an older boy named Ryan who scammed him out of cigarettes.

One day they learned from a older girl named Amanda that David was an actor and was in an acclaimed film called bloody knuckles and according to critics the lead actress has a scene where her breasts are exposed. The trio try to steal from a dvd store but a rumor that the owner Iggy carries a gun on him and pulled it out on Bobby one time. The following night the boys are curious on what's in the trunk so they sneak it out of Andy's house but are unable to break the lock, the neighbors dog joins them with the side quest. The trio play hooky and go to the DVD store to shoplift bloody knuckles but it's in a backroom, Andy and David try to distract Iggy so Charlie can get the film. Two boys (one of them is Ryan) who knows Iggy try and pick up a supply from him and Iggy starts wandering to the computer to look up a film Andy is supposedly looking for but Andy knocks over a shelf and insists Iggy to pick up the mess. When Iggy bends down Andy and David notice a handgun in Iggy's waistband. While in the back Charlie find pornography dvds and on his way out of the back Ryan sees him and locks him in the backroom with no escape. Charlie later finds a few rifles in the basement. The trio manage to escape the shop but without the pornography and bloody knuckles.

Next day at lunch Charlie learns from another friend of theirs Felix that a girl Charlie used to like gave his friend Bobby oral sex. Later Andy gets his hands on bolt cutters and they go to open the trunk. The following night the trio opens the trunk to find cigarettes, porn magazines, liquor, firecrackers and a revolver. The boys find out that David moved to their town because his parents split after David witnessed his dad having sex with another woman. The following day Charlie shows Felix the gun and the two ditch school to get bullets from the DVD store while it's closed. While in the store Iggy shows up unexpectedly and come to find out the DVD store is cover for a drug ring Iggy is in charge of. The two boys barley escape but they managed to get their hands on bullets

The night of the party. Charlie tries to use the keg and accidentally gets beer on Amanda's sister Lindsey who them asks if he has a cigarette. Lindsey and Charlie sit outside smoking cigarettes and have a nice moment. Lindsey later invites Charlie to a party the next week. Charlie then brags to David and Andy and they tell Charlie to get her phone number. Charlie goes to get her number only to find her making out with Ryan. Crushed Charlie, Andy and David leave the party and Charlie throws a rock through Ryan's windshield shattering it

After the party Andy and Charlie have a falling out. The next day Felix David and Andy are playing around with the gun. Andy and David later learn that Ryan got in trouble after his windshield was shattered and the police showed up at the party tried to calm down Ryan and a bag of pills fell out of his pocket leading to his arrest. The boys decide to go out and shoot the gun and invite Charlie to tag along. Charlie throws the gun at Andy and it causes it to discharge and they accidentally shoot the neighbors dog. Felix bails on them and keeps telling them to bury the dog Charlie does the same. However David and Andy wrap the dog in a sheet and get it to a vet.

Unfortunately there was nothing the vet could do and the dog passes away. Andy's neighbors try to pay the trio for trying to save their dog but David says that they can't accept the payment. The neighbor recognizes David and happens to own a copy of Bloody Knuckles and asks David if he could sign it. They leave and Charlie steals the copy and they all watch the film. They find out that the actress in the film didn't have a nude scene disappointing Andy and Charlie. Bobby shows up to pick up the trunk and Charlie tells him that it's gone and tell him to fuck off, Charlie then rides his bike home.

== Cast ==
- Dylan Hartigan as Andy Gilmour
- Alex Maizus as Charlie Waters
- Jordan Puzzo as David Mason
- Charles Odei as Felix Thurman
- Michaela McManus as Patricia Gilmour
- Kevin Corrigan as Iggy Vannucci
- Clancy Cavanaugh as The Dog

== Production ==
Production began in July 2010. The McManus Brothers were inspired by their father's stories about growing up as an altar server in Catholic school.

== Release ==
The film was first screened in the US at the South by Southwest Film Festival on March 10, 2012. It went on general release on November 16, 2012.

== Reception ==
The film received an 88% "fresh" rating on Rotten Tomatoes. John Anderson of Variety said the film was "like a John Hughes comedy with nicotine stains." He went on to say " it could become one of those films by which an age group defines itself." Mark Olsen of The Los Angeles Times said the film was "a surprisingly sweet story about a pair of Rhode Island Catholic schoolboys, played with knockabout charm by Alex Maizus and Dylan Hartigan." He criticized the film for "its impulse toward honesty over overstatement" which he said, "robs the film of true dramatic tension." Drew McWeeny of Hitfix wrote "'Funeral Kings' is confident and controlled and, with an unabashed vulgarity underscoring everything, about as pure a piece of movie memory as I can name."
