= The Block Island Sound =

- Poster
- Directed by: Kevin McManus; Matthew McManus
- Written by: Kevin McManus; Matthew McManus
- Produced by: Andrew van den Houten; Ashleigh Snead
- Starring: Chris Sheffield; Michaela McManus
- Cinematography: Alan Gwizdowski
- Edited by: Derek Desmond
- Music by: Paul Koch
- Production companies: 30 Bones Cinema; Hood River Entertainment; Captain Intertia Productions; Title Media
- Release dates: August 28, 2020 (Fantasia); March 11, 2021 (Netflix)
- Running time: 97 minutes
- Country: United States
- Language: English

The Block Island Sound is a 2020 American science fiction horror thriller film written and directed by Kevin McManus and Matthew McManus and starring Chris Sheffield and Michaela McManus. The plot follows family members of a fisherman who encounter horrors and dark truths when an ominous force off the coast of Block Island begins killing wildlife.

The Block Island Sound was released on Netflix on 11 March 2021. The film received positive reviews from critics.

== Plot ==
Tom is a fisherman who wakes up alone and bewildered on his fishing vessel off the coast of Block Island to a scene of disarray. Reports of strange phenomena become evident on the island, including tons of dead fish washing ashore. Harry, Tom’s son, notices strange behaviour from his father such as taking his fishing boat out during the middle of the night and becoming unresponsive during conversation. Harry's sister Audry, who lives on the Rhode Island mainland, is sent from her job at the Environmental Protection Agency to investigate the strange wildlife occurrences along with her coworker Paul. Audry takes her daughter Emily along and decides to stay on the island with her, Tom, and Harry.

As Audry and Paul investigate the strange occurrences, Harry attempts to bond with his niece by showing Emily how to fish and catch frogs. Tom's behavior becomes erratic, and one night Tom takes his boat out during the middle of the night and vanishes without a trace. The local police persuade Audry and Harry to accept that their father has likely drowned, which is soon proven true as Tom's body washes ashore.

Harry struggles to accept the circumstances of his father's death. His mental health deteriorates as his other estranged sister Jen returns home to Block Island from New York for the funeral, during which Harry gets in a fight with an older man. He talks to his conspiracy theorist friend Dale and learns that similar disturbances have been happening across the world. He borrows scuba equipment to investigate the area where Tom drowned, but becomes unconscious underwater only to awaken on the fishing vessel while the electronics are scrambled and a strange noise is emitted.

Harry hits a deer while distracted by a vision of Tom after dropping Jen off at the ferry, and his increasingly erratic behavior spurs Audry to bring him to a psychologist. The psychologist speculates that he may be suffering from electromagnetic hypersensitivity caused by the Block Island Wind Farm and encourages Harry and Audry to contact a former patient with similar experiences. Harry steals a neighbour's dog after being awoken by visions of Tom, taking it to the same spot in Block Island Sound until a bizarre experience occurs where everything on the boat, including Harry and the dog, begins to ascend toward the sky. Harry crashes back down onto the boat but the dog goes missing, leaving behind only its lead.

Audry's colleague Paul offers to watch Emily and look after Harry while she drives to meet the former patient. The man explains to Audry that his paranoia is a result of being watched or influenced by some otherworldly force. He warns her that someone will get hurt if she doesn't get Harry away from the island.

While Audry is unsettled by the encounter and drives back to take the last ferry home, Harry resists yet another vision of his father telling him to take the "girl" (Emily), instead going for a nighttime drive where he narrowly avoids crashing into a female jogger. He then attempts to attack the woman but fails, and returns to the house. Audrey returns to find Paul knocked unconscious and hears Emily's screams as Harry abducts her onto the fishing boat. She manages to jump onto the vessel but is unable to reason with her psychotic brother, who again returns to the site of the disturbance. Audry barricades Emily and herself in the cabin of the boat; they soon experience a wailing sound and rattling as objects on the boat - along with Harry - start ascending into the sky again. Audry is carried into the sky as the cabin door gives way. The next morning, Emily is discovered alone in the cabin of the vessel by the local authorities. The movie ends with Audry being dropped into the ocean alive and treading water as a voiceover plays from an earlier scene where she describes to Emily why biologists justify taking certain individual fish out of their natural habitat to study them.

== Cast ==
- Chris Sheffield as Harry
- Michaela McManus as Audry
- Neville Archambault as Tom
- Jim Cummings as Dale
- Jeremy Holm as Kurt
- Matilda Lawler as Emily
- Ryan O'Flanagan as Paul
- Willie C. Carpenter as Chief Rogers
- Heidi Neidermeyer as Jen

== Release ==
The film premiered at the Fantasia International Film Festival on August 28, 2020.

It was then released on Netflix on March 11, 2021.

== Reception ==
The Block Island Sound was met with critical acclaim. On Rotten Tomatoes the film has a 90% rating based on 30 reviews.

Kalyn Corrigan of /Film gave the film an 8 out of 10. Michelle Swope of Dread Central awarded the film four stars out of five. Joe Lipsett of Bloody Disgusting awarded the film four skulls out of five.

J Hurtado of ScreenAnarchy gave the film a positive review and wrote, "If you're expecting a monster movie, you might be disappointed at the lack of blood and guts, but if you'll open your mind, The Block Island Sound just might scare the hell out of you."

Edward Guimont argued that while there are similarities to the work of H. P. Lovecraft, a closer parallel is Charles Fort's 1919 The Book of the Damned.
